= W-League transfers for 2019–20 season =

This is a list of Australian soccer transfers for the 2019–20 W-League. Only moves featuring at least one W-League club are listed.

== Transfers ==
All players without a flag are Australian. Clubs without a flag are clubs participating in the W-League.

=== Pre-season ===
Date	Name	Moving from	Moving to
17 January 2019	(Netherlands) Maruschka Waldus	Western Sydney Wanderers	(Norway) Vålerenga
14 February 2019	Amy Harrison	Sydney FC	(United States) Washington Spirit
22 February 2019	Maddy Whittall	Canberra United	(Australia) Belconnen United
23 February 2019	(Chile) María José Rojas	Canberra United	(Czech Republic) Slavia Prague
4 March 2019	(United States) Arin Wright	Newcastle Jets	(United States) Chicago Red Stars (end of loan)
7 March 2019	Meleri Mullan	Adelaide United	(Australia) Adelaide University
11 March 2019	Adriana Jones	Melbourne City	(Australia) South Melbourne
15 March 2019	Abbey Lloyd	Brisbane Roar	(Australia) Capalaba FC
15 March 2019	Dani Ward	Brisbane Roar	(Australia) Western Pride
15 March 2019	Servet Uzunlar	Western Sydney Wanderers	(Australia) Northern Tigers
3 April 2019	(Ghana) Elizabeth Addo	Western Sydney Wanderers (Note: Addo returned from loan to her parent club Reign FC before signing with Jiangsu Suning)	(China) Jiangsu Suning
25 April 2019	Shelby Green	Melbourne City	(Australia) South Melbourne
19 June 2019	(United States) Savannah McCaskill	Sydney FC (Note: McCaskill returned from loan to her parent club Sky Blue FC before signing with Chicago Red Stars)	(United States) Chicago Red Stars (end of loan)
20 June 2019	(United States) Britt Eckerstrom	Newcastle Jets	(United States) Portland Thorns FC (end of loan)
20 June 2019	(United States) Taylor Smith	Newcastle Jets	(United States) Washington Spirit (end of loan)
21 June 2019	Rachel Lowe	Western Sydney Wanderers	(United States) UCLA Bruins
11 July 2019	(South Africa) Rhoda Mulaudzi	Canberra United	(Cyprus) Apollon Limassol
19 July 2019	Jacynta Galabadaarachchi	Perth Glory	(England) West Ham United
9 August 2019	Lisa De Vanna	Sydney FC	(Italy) Fiorentina
23 August 2019	Emily Gielnik	Melbourne Victory	(Germany) Bayern Munich
1 September 2019	(England) Chioma Ubogagu	Brisbane Roar (Note: Ubogagu returned from loan to her parent club Orlando Pride before signing with Tacón)	(Spain) Tacón
6 September 2019	(South Africa) Refiloe Jane	Canberra United	(Italy) Milan
19 September 2019	Emma Checker	Adelaide United	Melbourne City
24 September 2019	Ellie Brush	Western Sydney Wanderers	Sydney FC
24 September 2019	Mackenzie Hawkesby	Western Sydney Wanderers	Sydney FC
24 September 2019	Remy Siemsen	Western Sydney Wanderers	Sydney FC
26 September 2019	Emily van Egmond	(United States) Orlando Pride	Melbourne City (loan)
27 September 2019	Ciara Fowler	(Australia) Bankstown City	Adelaide United
27 September 2019	Mary Fowler	(Australia) Bankstown City	Adelaide United
30 September 2019	(Norway) Elise Thorsnes	(Norway) LSK Kvinner	Canberra United
2 October 2019	Natasha Prior	Canberra United	Retired
3 October 2019	(Scotland) Rachel Corsie	Canberra United	(United States) Utah Royals (end of loan)
5 October 2019	Jenna McCormick	Brisbane Roar	Melbourne Victory
8 October 2019	Tameka Yallop	Melbourne City	Brisbane Roar
9 October 2019	Georgina Worth	Unattached	Brisbane Roar
11 October 2019	Lauren Allan	(Australia) New Lambton	Newcastle Jets
11 October 2019	Nickoletta Flannery	Canberra United	Newcastle Jets
11 October 2019	Annabel Martin	Melbourne Victory	Newcastle Jets
14 October 2019	(United States) Rylee Baisden	(Australia) Moreton Bay United	Brisbane Roar
14 October 2019	Claire Farrington	(Australia) Logan Lightning	Brisbane Roar
14 October 2019	(Iceland) Fanndís Friðriksdóttir	Adelaide United	(Iceland) Valur (end of loan)
14 October 2019	(Iceland) Gunnhildur Yrsa Jónsdóttir	Adelaide United	(United States) Utah Royals (end of loan)
15 October 2019	(United States) Danielle Colaprico	Sydney FC	(United States) Chicago Red Stars (end of loan)
15 October 2019	Rachael Soutar	Sydney FC	Unattached
15 October 2019	Annalee Grove	Brisbane Roar	Canberra United
18 October 2019	(United States) Veronica Latsko	Adelaide United (Note: Latsko returned from loan to her parent club Houston Dash before being loaned to Sydney FC)	Sydney FC
21 October 2019	Sam Kerr	Perth Glory	Unattached
22 October 2019	Alexandra Huynh	(United States) Colorado Buffaloes	Western Sydney Wanderers
22 October 2019	Alix Roberts	(Denmark) Undisclosed	Western Sydney Wanderers
22 October 2019	(United States) Samantha Johnson	Melbourne Victory	Retired
23 October 2019	Amy Harrison	(United States) Washington Spirit	Western Sydney Wanderers
23 October 2019	(United States) Sam Staab	(United States) Washington Spirit	Western Sydney Wanderers
24 October 2019	Melissa Maizels	Canberra United	Melbourne Victory
25 October 2019	Hayley Taylor-Young	(Australia) Canberra United Academy	Canberra United
25 October 2019	(New Zealand) Annalie Longo	Unattached	Melbourne Victory
26 October 2019	Elise Kellond-Knight	Melbourne City	Brisbane Roar
28 October 2019	Jessie Rasschaert	(Australia) Belconnen United	Canberra United
29 October 2019	Ellie Carpenter	Canberra United (Note: Carpenter returned to her parent club Portland Thorns before being loaned to Melbourne City)	Melbourne City
29 October 2019	(United States) Kristen Hamilton	(United States) North Carolina Courage	Western Sydney Wanderers
29 October 2019	(Republic of Ireland) Denise O'Sullivan	(United States) North Carolina Courage	Western Sydney Wanderers (loan)
29 October 2019	(United States) Lynn Williams	(United States) North Carolina Courage	Western Sydney Wanderers (loan)
30 October 2019	(United States) Mallory Weber	(United States) Utah Royals	Adelaide United (loan)
30 October 2019	Amy Jackson	Melbourne City	Melbourne Victory
30 October 2019	Rosie Sutton	Unattached	Melbourne Victory
31 October 2019	Polly Doran	(Australia) Calder United	Melbourne Victory
31 October 2019	Emma Robers	(Australia) Calder United	Melbourne Victory
31 October 2019	Nicole Simonsen	Western Sydney Wanderers	Newcastle Jets
31 October 2019	Leena Khamis	Western Sydney Wanderers	Canberra United
3 November 2019	(United States) Katie Stengel	Newcastle Jets (Note: Stengel returned from loan to her parent club Utah Royals before being loaned to Canberra United)	Canberra United
4 November 2019	(Scotland) Claire Emslie	(United States) Orlando Pride	Melbourne City (loan)
4 November 2019	(Denmark) Theresa Nielsen	Melbourne City	(United States) Reign FC (end of loan)
4 November 2019	(United States) Jasmyne Spencer	Melbourne City	(United States) Reign FC (end of loan)
4 November 2019	(United States) Rachel Hill	Perth Glory	(United States) Orlando Pride (end of loan)
4 November 2019	(United States) Lo'eau LaBonta	Western Sydney Wanderers	(United States) Utah Royals (end of loan)
4 November 2019	(United States) Sydney Miramontez	Western Sydney Wanderers	(United States) Utah Royals (end of loan)
5 November 2019	(United States) Simone Charley	(United States) Portland Thorns	Canberra United (loan)
6 November 2019	Kyra Cooney-Cross	Melbourne Victory	Western Sydney Wanderers
6 November 2019	(United States) Haley Hanson	(United States) Houston Dash	Melbourne Victory
6 November 2019	(United States) Darian Jenkins	(United States) Reign FC	Melbourne Victory
6 November 2019	(United States) Emily Menges	(United States) Portland Thorns	Melbourne Victory (loan)
6 November 2019	Isobel Dalton	(England) Nottingham Forest	Brisbane Roar
7 November 2019	Patricia Charalambous	(Cyprus) Apollon Limassol	Canberra United
7 November 2019	Ashlie Crofts	(Australia) Blacktown Spartans	Canberra United
7 November 2019	Rebekah Horsey	(Australia) Lions FC	Canberra United
7 November 2019	Emma Stanbury	(Australia) NWS Koalas	Canberra United
8 November 2019	(United States) Julia Ashley	Unattached	Adelaide United
8 November 2019	(Spain) Celia	(United States) Reign FC	Perth Glory (loan)
8 November 2019	(United States) Morgan Andrews	(United States) Reign FC	Perth Glory (loan)
8 November 2019	Ella Mastrantonio	Melbourne Victory	Western Sydney Wanderers
9 November 2019	Matilda McNamara	(Australia) Adelaide City	Adelaide United
11 November 2019	Cortnee Vine	Newcastle Jets	Western Sydney Wanderers
11 November 2019	(Serbia) Milica Mijatović	(Norway) Arna-Bjørnar	Melbourne City
11 November 2019	(Brazil) Lais Araujo	(Norway) Arna-Bjørnar	Adelaide United
12 November 2019	Vesna Milivojevic	(Australia) Bankstown City	Western Sydney Wanderers
12 November 2019	(United States) Abby Smith	(United States) Utah Royals	Western Sydney Wanderers
12 November 2019	(United States) Kaleigh Kurtz	(United States) North Carolina Courage	Canberra United (loan)
12 November 2019	Grace Abbey	Adelaide United	Unattached
12 November 2019	Georgia Iannella	Adelaide United	Unattached
12 November 2019	Michelle Heyman	Adelaide United	Unattached
12 November 2019	Lara Kirkby	Adelaide United	Unattached
12 November 2019	Sian McLaren	Adelaide United	Unattached
12 November 2019	(Japan) Yūki Nagasato	Bribsane Roar	(United States) Chicago Red Stars (end of loan)
12 November 2019	Summer O'Brien	Brisbane Roar	Unattached
12 November 2019	Rosie Galea	Canberra United	Unattached
12 November 2019	Meaghan McElligott	Canberra United	Unattached
12 November 2019	Helen Caceres	Melbourne City	Unattached
12 November 2019	MelindaJ Barbieri	Melbourne Victory	Unattached
12 November 2019	Bethany Mason-Jones	Melbourne Victory	Unattached
12 November 2019	(United States) Christine Nairn	Melbourne Victory	(United States) Houston Dash
12 November 2019	(United States) Dani Weatherholt	Melbourne Victory	(United States) Orlando Pride (end of loan)
12 November 2019	Stacey Cavill	Perth Glory	Unattached
12 November 2019	(United States) Alyssa Mautz	Perth Glory	(United States) Chicago Red Stars (end of loan)
12 November 2019	Abbey Meakins	Perth Glory	Unattached
12 November 2019	(United States) Katie Naughton	Perth Glory	(United States) Chicago Red Stars (end of loan)
12 November 2019	(United States) Nikki Stanton	Perth Glory	(United States) Chicago Red Stars (end of loan)
12 November 2019	Caitlin Jarvie	Western Sydney Wanderers	Unattached
12 November 2019	Talitha Kramer	Western Sydney Wanderers	Unattached
12 November 2019	Kylie Ledbrook	Western Sydney Wanderers	Unattached
12 November 2019	Georgia Yeoman-Dale	Western Sydney Wanderers	Unattached
13 November 2019	(Brazil) Camila	(United States) Orlando Pride	Canberra United (loan)
13 November 2019	(Mexico) Arianna Romero	(United States) Houston Dash	Perth Glory (loan)
13 November 2019	(United States) Crystal Thomas	(United States) Washington Spirit	Perth Glory (loan)
13 November 2019	Tiana Jaber	(Australia) NWS Koalas	Western Sydney Wanderers
14 November 2019	Rachael Goldstein	(Australia) Canberra FC	Canberra United
14 November 2019	Sally James	(Australia) Belconnen United	Canberra United
15 November 2019	Katarina Jukic	Unattached	Perth Glory
15 November 2019	Ayesha Norrie	(United States) LA Galaxy OC	Perth Glory
15 November 2019	Julia Sardo	(Australia) Alamein FC	Perth Glory
17 November 2019	Janna Lawson	Melbourne City	Unattached
17 November 2019	Katherine Goff	(Australia) Heidelberg United	Melbourne City
17 November 2019	Maja Markovski	(Australia) Box Hill United	Melbourne City

=== Mid-season ===
Date	Name	Moving from	Moving to
20 November 2019	Aivi Luik	(Norway) Avaldsnes	Melbourne City
28 November 2019	Larissa Crummer	Newcastle Jets	Unattached
20 December 2019	Teagan Micah	(United States) UCLA Bruins	Melbourne Victory
17 January 2020	Hayley Raso	Brisbane Roar	(England) Everton
21 January 2020	(Republic of Ireland) Denise O'Sullivan	Western Sydney Wanderers	(United States) North Carolina Courage (end of loan)
22 January 2020	Alexandra Gummer	Melbourne Victory	(Switzerland) Young Boys
24 January 2020	Chloe Logarzo	Sydney FC	(England) Bristol City
24 January 2020	Caitlin Foord	Sydney FC	(England) Arsenal
28 January 2020	(Canada) Lindsay Agnew	(United States) Houston Dash	Sydney FC
29 January 2020	Mary Fowler	Adelaide United	(France) Montpellier
30 January 2020	(United States) Ally Watt	(United States) North Carolina Courage	Melbourne City (loan)
31 January 2020	Victoria Mansueto	(Australia) Adelaide Comets	Adelaide United
31 January 2020	Ella Tonkin	Unattached	Adelaide United
4 February 2020	Vesna Milivojevic	Western Sydney Wanderers	(Serbia) Spartak Subotica
12 February 2020	(United States) Shea Connors	(Australia) Logan Lightning	Brisbane Roar
14 February 2020	Rosie Galea	(Australia) Macarthur Rams	Western Sydney Wanderers
14 February 2020	Chloe Middleton	(Australia) Illawarra Stingrays	Western Sydney Wanderers
14 February 2020	Sophie Magus	(Australia) Sydney University	Western Sydney Wanderers
14 February 2020	Danika Matos	(Australia) Illawarra Stingrays	Western Sydney Wanderers
16 February 2020	(United States) Lynn Williams	Western Sydney Wanderers	(United States) North Carolina Courage (end of loan)
18 February 2020	Aoife Colvill	Canberra United	(Scotland) Glasgow City
23 February 2020	Isobel Dalton	Brisbane Roar	(Scotland) Glasgow City
25 February 2020	Julia Vignes	Sydney FC	(Australia) Sydney Olympic
13 March 2020	Karly Roestbakken	Canberra United	(Norway) LSK Kvinner
14 March 2020	Sham Khamis	Canberra United	Melbourne Victory (loan)
16 March 2020	Sham Khamis	Melbourne Victory	Canberra United (end of loan)

== Re-signings ==
Date	Name	Club
19 September 2019	Chelsea Blissett	Melbourne City
19 September 2019	Sofia Sakalis	Melbourne City
24 September 2019	Karly Roestbakken	Canberra United
24 September 2019	(United States) Aubrey Bledsoe	Sydney FC
24 September 2019	Trudy Burke	Sydney FC
24 September 2019	Shadeene Evans	Sydney FC
24 September 2019	Caitlin Foord	Sydney FC
24 September 2019	Ally Green	Sydney FC
24 September 2019	Angelique Hristodoulou	Sydney FC
24 September 2019	(United States) Sofia Huerta	Sydney FC
24 September 2019	Princess Ibini	Sydney FC
24 September 2019	Alanna Kennedy	Sydney FC
24 September 2019	Chloe Logarzo	Sydney FC
24 September 2019	Teresa Polias	Sydney FC
24 September 2019	Elizabeth Ralston	Sydney FC
24 September 2019	Taylor Ray	Sydney FC
24 September 2019	Amy Sayer	Sydney FC
24 September 2019	Natalie Tobin	Sydney FC
26 September 2019	Courtney Nevin	Western Sydney Wanderers
26 September 2019	Jada Whyman	Western Sydney Wanderers
27 September 2019	Georgia Campagnale	Adelaide United
27 September 2019	Emily Condon	Adelaide United
27 September 2019	Chelsie Dawber	Adelaide United
27 September 2019	Emily Hodgson	Adelaide United
30 September 2019	Charlotte Grant	Adelaide United
30 September 2019	Kahlia Hogg	Adelaide United
30 September 2019	Dylan Holmes	Adelaide United
30 September 2019	Laura Johns	Adelaide United
30 September 2019	Sarah Willacy	Adelaide United
3 October 2019	Nikola Orgill	Canberra United
8 October 2019	Katrina Gorry	Brisbane Roar
9 October 2019	Leah Davidson	Brisbane Roar
9 October 2019	Hollie Palmer	Brisbane Roar
9 October 2019	Indiah-Paige Riley	Brisbane Roar
9 October 2019	Kaitlyn Torpey	Brisbane Roar
9 October 2019	Tara Andrews	Newcastle Jets
9 October 2019	Hannah Brewer	Newcastle Jets
9 October 2019	Claire Coelho	Newcastle Jets
9 October 2019	Teigan Collister	Newcastle Jets
9 October 2019	Libby Copus-Brown	Newcastle Jets
9 October 2019	Larissa Crummer	Newcastle Jets
9 October 2019	Cassidy Davis	Newcastle Jets
9 October 2019	Jenna Kingsley	Newcastle Jets
9 October 2019	Paige Kingston-Hogg	Newcastle Jets
9 October 2019	Sophie Nenadovic	Newcastle Jets
9 October 2019	Pana Petratos	Newcastle Jets
9 October 2019	Renee Pountney	Newcastle Jets
9 October 2019	Gema Simon	Newcastle Jets
9 October 2019	Tessa Tamplin	Newcastle Jets
9 October 2019	Clare Wheeler	Newcastle Jets
10 October 2019	Melissa Barbieri	Melbourne City
10 October 2019	Rhali Dobson	Melbourne City
10 October 2019	Kyah Simon	Melbourne City
10 October 2019	Nia Stamatopoulos	Melbourne City
10 October 2019	Tyla-Jay Vlajnic	Melbourne City
11 October 2019	Natalie Tathem	Brisbane Roar
11 October 2019	Allira Toby	Brisbane Roar
15 October 2019	Sham Khamis	Canberra United
16 October 2019	Clare Polkinghorne	Brisbane Roar
17 October 2019	Susan Phonsongkham	Western Sydney Wanderers
18 October 2019	Morgan Aquino	Perth Glory
18 October 2019	Eliza Campbell	Perth Glory
18 October 2019	Kim Carroll	Perth Glory
18 October 2019	Sarah Carroll	Perth Glory
18 October 2019	Caitlin Doeglas	Perth Glory
18 October 2019	Jamie-Lee Gale	Perth Glory
18 October 2019	Shannon May	Perth Glory
18 October 2019	Leticia McKenna	Perth Glory
18 October 2019	Lexie Moreno	Perth Glory
18 October 2019	Jenna Onions	Perth Glory
18 October 2019	Natasha Rigby	Perth Glory
18 October 2019	Taren King	Canberra United
18 October 2019	Olivia Price	Canberra United
25 October 2019	Laura Hughes	Canberra United
28 October 2019	Teigen Allen	Melbourne Victory
28 October 2019	Alexandra Gummer	Melbourne Victory
28 October 2019	Lia Privitelli	Melbourne Victory
29 October 2019	Melina Ayres	Melbourne Victory
29 October 2019	Grace Maher	Melbourne Victory
29 October 2019	Hayley Raso	Brisbane Roar
29 October 2019	Isabel Hodgson	Adelaide United
30 October 2019	(United States) Lauren Barnes	Melbourne City
30 October 2019	(Japan) Yukari Kinga	Melbourne City
30 October 2019	Lydia Williams	Melbourne City
1 November 2019	(United States) Carson Pickett	Brisbane Roar
2 November 2019	Steph Catley	Melbourne City
4 November 2019	(United States) Amber Brooks	Adelaide United
4 November 2019	Liana Danaskos	Western Sydney Wanderers
5 November 2019	Erica Halloway	Western Sydney Wanderers
8 November 2019	(United States) Celeste Boureille	Brisbane Roar
9 November 2019	Evelyn Goldsmith	Adelaide United
13 November 2019	Caitlin Cooper	Western Sydney Wanderers
13 November 2019	Courtney Newbon	Western Sydney Wanderers
14 November 2019	Aoife Colvill	Canberra United
14 November 2019	Lauren Keir	Canberra United
19 September 2019	(New Zealand) Rebekah Stott	Melbourne City
20 November 2019	Anna Margraf	Brisbane Roar
15 January 2020	(Norway) Elise Thorsnes	Canberra United (Note: At the conclusion of her guest contract, Thorsnes extended her contract as an injury replacement player for Katie Stengel)
