= 2019–20 Newcastle Jets FC (women) season =

Newcastle Jets Women
2019–20 season
- Chairman: Lawrie McKinna
- Manager: Ashley Wilson
- Stadium: Newcastle No.2 Sportsground
- W-League: 9th
- Top goalscorer: Tara Andrews (8)
Home colours	Away colours	Third colours

The 2019–20 season was Newcastle Jets Women's twelfth season in the W-League.

== Players ==
Note: Flags indicate national team as defined under FIFA eligibility rules; some limited exceptions apply. Players may hold more than one non-FIFA nationality.

No.	Pos.	Nation	Player
2	DF	AUS	Hannah Brewer
4	MF	AUS	Libby Copus-Brown
6	MF	AUS	Cassidy Davis
7	DF	AUS	Gema Simon
8	DF	AUS	Sophie Nenadovic
9	FW	AUS	Nickoletta Flannery
12	FW	AUS	Tara Andrews
14	FW	AUS	Lauren Allan
15	FW	AUS	Renee Pountney

No.	Pos.	Nation	Player
17	FW	AUS	Jenna Kingsley
18	MF	AUS	Clare Wheeler
19	MF	AUS	Pana Petratos
20	GK	AUS	Claire Coelho
23	DF	AUS	Annabel Martin
25	MF	AUS	Teigan Collister
26	GK	AUS	Nicole Simonsen
31	MF	AUS	Paige Kingston-Hogg
32	DF	AUS	Tessa Tamplin

== Transfers ==
=== Transfers in ===
No.	Position	Player	Transferred from	Type/fee	Contract length	Date	Ref
14	FW	Lauren Allan	(Australia) New Lambton	Free transfer	2 years	11 October 2019	
9	FW	Nickoletta Flannery	Canberra United	Free transfer	2 years	11 October 2019	
23	DF	Annabel Martin	Melbourne Victory	Free transfer	2 years	11 October 2019	
26	GK	Nicole Simonsen	Western Sydney Wanderers	Free transfer	2 years	31 October 2019	

=== Transfers out ===
No.	Position	Player	Transferred from	Type/fee	Date	Ref
5	DF	(United States) Arin Wright	(United States) Chicago Red Stars	Loan return	4 March 2019	
28	GK	(United States) Britt Eckerstrom	(United States) Portland Thorns FC	Loan return	20 June 2019	
14	DF	(United States) Taylor Smith	(United States) Washington Spirit	Loan return	20 June 2019	
9	FW	(United States) Katie Stengel	Canberra United	Loan return	3 November 2019	
11	FW	Cortnee Vine	Western Sydney Wanderers	Free transfer	11 November 2019	

== Competitions ==
=== W-League ===
==== League table ====
Pos	Team	Pld	W	D	L	GF	GA	GD	Pts	Qualification
1	Melbourne City (C)	12	11	1	0	27	4	+23	34	Qualification to Finals series
2	Melbourne Victory	12	7	2	3	24	14	+10	23	Qualification to Finals series
3	Sydney FC	12	7	1	4	21	13	+8	22	Qualification to Finals series
4	Western Sydney Wanderers	12	7	1	4	24	20	+4	22	Qualification to Finals series
5	Brisbane Roar	12	5	2	5	22	19	+3	17	
6	Canberra United	12	4	1	7	13	29	−16	13	
7	Perth Glory	12	3	2	7	19	24	−5	11	
8	Adelaide United	12	2	1	9	12	24	−12	7	
9	Newcastle Jets	12	2	1	9	12	27	−15	7	

Source: A-Leagues
Rules for classification: 1) points; 2) goal difference; 3) number of goals scored.
(C) Champions

==== Results summary ====
Overall								Home						Away					
Pld	W	D	L	GF	GA	GD	Pts	W	D	L	GF	GA	GD	W	D	L	GF	GA	GD
12	2	1	9	12	27	−15	7	1	1	4	7	17	−10	1	0	5	5	10	−5

Last updated: 23 May 2021.
Source: Fixtures

Round	1	2	3	4	5	6	7	8	9	10	11	12	13	14
Ground	H	A	H	A	H	B	A	A	B	A	H	H	H	A
Result	D	L	L	W	L	B	L	L	B	L	L	W	L	L
Position	4	6	6	5	6	7	7	7	7	7	7	8	8	9

Updated to match(es) played on 27 February 2020. Source: worldfootball.net
A = Away; H = Home; B = Bye; W = Win; D = Draw; L = Loss

==== Matches ====
Win Draw Loss

17 November 2019 1	Newcastle Jets	1–1	Melbourne City	Newcastle
18:00 AEDT	Collister 67'		van Egmond 22'	Stadium: Newcastle No. 2 Sportsground; Attendance: 1,523; Referee: Kelly Jones

22 November 2019 2	Western Sydney Wanderers	1–0	Newcastle Jets	Sydney
17:00 AEDT	Harrison 59' (pen.)	Report		Stadium: Bankwest Stadium; Attendance: 2,992; Referee: Kelly Jones

30 November 2019 3	Newcastle Jets	2–3	Canberra United	Newcastle
16:50 AEDT	Andrews 41' (pen.), 45+1' (pen.)	Report	Crofts 29'; Charley 32'; Thorsnes 81'	Stadium: Newcastle International Sports Centre; Attendance: 3,446; Referee: Isabella Libri

7 December 2019 4	Perth Glory	1–2	Newcastle Jets	Perth
19:15 AWST	Jiménez 57'	Report	Flannery 23'; Andrews 46'	Stadium: Dorrien Gardens; Attendance: 604; Referee: Lara Lee

15 December 2019 5	Newcastle Jets	0–2	Sydney FC	Newcastle
16:00 AEDT		Report	Siemsen 31', 50'	Stadium: Newcastle International Sports Centre; Attendance: 2,513; Referee: Rachel Mitchenson

29 December 2019 7	Brisbane Roar	2–1	Newcastle Jets	Brisbane
16:00 AEST	Polkinghorne 41'; Palmer 69'	Report	Andrews 22'	Stadium: Lions Stadium; Attendance: 2,189; Referee: Georgia Ghirardello

5 January 2020 8	Melbourne Victory	2–1	Newcastle Jets	Melbourne
16:00 AEDT	Dowie 10'; Jenkins 25'	Report	Simon 61'	Stadium: AAMI Park; Attendance: 2,189; Referee: Rebecca Durcau

18 January 2020 10	Melbourne City	2–0	Newcastle Jets	Melbourne
17:00 AEDT	Mijatovic 7'; van Egmond 50'	Report		Stadium: AAMI Park; Attendance: 1,989; Referee: Rebecca Durcau

23 January 2020 11	Newcastle Jets	2–4	Perth Glory	Newcastle
19:30 AEDT	Tamplin 75'; Allan 83'	Report	Lowry 22'; Andrews 45+2'; Doeglas 65'; Jiménez 78'	Stadium: Newcastle International Sports Centre; Attendance: 828; Referee: Georgia Ghirardello

1 February 2020 9	Newcastle Jets	2–0	Adelaide United	Newcastle
19:50 AEDT	Andrews 52'; Pountney 78'	Report		Stadium: Newcastle International Sports Centre; Attendance: 513; Referee: Lara Lee

23 February 2020 13	Newcastle Jets	0–7	Melbourne Victory	Newcastle
16:00 AEDT		Report	Longo 3', 7'; Dowie 33'; Jenkins 40', 59'; Davis 69' (o.g.); Ayres 83'	Stadium: Newcastle International Sports Centre; Attendance: 1,321; Referee: Isabella Blaess

27 February 2020 14	Adelaide United	2–1	Newcastle Jets	Adelaide
16:00 ACDT	Brooks 24' (pen.); Weber 61'	Report	Collister 37'	Stadium: Marden Sports Complex; Attendance: 832; Referee: Rebecca Mackie

== Statistics ==
=== Appearances and goals ===
Players with no appearances not included in the list.

No.	Pos.	Nat.	Name	W-League		Total	
No.	Pos.	Nat.	Name	Apps	Goals	Apps	Goals
2	DF	(Australia)	Hannah Brewer	12	0	12	0
4	MF	(Australia)	Libby Copus-Brown	11	0	11	0
6	MF	(Australia)	Cassidy Davis	12	0	12	0
7	DF	(Australia)	Gema Simon	12	1	12	1
8	DF	(Australia)	Sophie Nenadovic	0(1)	0	0(1)	0
9	FW	(Australia)	Nickoletta Flannery	10	1	10	1
12	FW	(Australia)	Tara Andrews	12	5	12	5
14	FW	(Australia)	Lauren Allan	2(9)	1	2(9)	1
15	FW	(Australia)	Renee Pountney	0(4)	1	0(4)	1
17	FW	(Australia)	Jenna Kingsley	11(1)	0	11(1)	0
18	MF	(Australia)	Clare Wheeler	11	0	11	0
19	MF	(Australia)	Panagiota Petratos	3(9)	0	3(9)	0
20	GK	(Australia)	Claire Coelho	12	0	12	0
23	DF	(Australia)	Annabel Martin	1	0	1	0
25	MF	(Australia)	Teigan Collister	8(3)	2	8(3)	2
31	MF	(Australia)	Paige Kingston-Hogg	3(9)	0	3(9)	0
32	DF	(Australia)	Tessa Tamplin	12	1	12	1
