= 2018–19 Newcastle Jets FC (women) season =

Newcastle Jets W-League
2018–19 season
- Manager: Craig Deans
- Stadium: McDonald Jones Stadium and Newcastle Number 2 Sports Ground
- W-League: 7th
- Top goalscorer: Katie Stengel (3 goals)
Home colours	Away colours

The 2018–19 Newcastle Jets W-League season was their eleventh season in the W-League, the premier competition for women's soccer in Australia. The team played home games at McDonald Jones Stadium and Newcastle Number 2 Sports Ground. The club's manager for the season was Craig Deans.

== Players ==
=== Current squad ===
As of 26 November 2018 Note: Flags indicate national team as defined under FIFA eligibility rules; some limited exceptions apply. Players may hold more than one non-FIFA nationality.

No.	Pos.	Nation	Player
2	DF	AUS	Hannah Brewer
4	MF	AUS	Libby Copus-Brown
5	DF	USA	Arin Wright
6	FW	AUS	Cassidy Davis
7	MF	AUS	Gema Simon
8	DF	AUS	Sophie Nenadovic
9	FW	USA	Katie Stengel
10	MF	AUS	Emily van Egmond (captain)
11	FW	AUS	Cortnee Vine
12	FW	AUS	Tara Andrews
14	DF	USA	Taylor Smith

No.	Pos.	Nation	Player
15	FW	AUS	Renee Pountney
17	FW	AUS	Jenna Kingsley
18	MF	AUS	Clare Wheeler
20	GK	AUS	Claire Coelho
21	MF	AUS	Pana Petratos
22	FW	AUS	Larissa Crummer
25	FW	AUS	Teigan Collister
28	GK	USA	Britt Eckerstrom
31	DF	AUS	Paige Kingston-Hogg
32	DF	AUS	Tessa Tamplin

=== Transfers in ===
No.	Pos.	Nat.	Name	Age	Moving from	Type	Transfer window	Ends	Transfer fee	Source
22	DF	(Australia)	Larissa Crummer	22	Melbourne City	Transfer	Pre-season			
14	DF	(United States)	Taylor Smith	24	(United States) Washington Spirit	Loan	Pre-season			
5	DF	(United States)	Arin Wright	25	(United States) Chicago Red Stars	Loan	Mid-season			

=== Transfers out ===
No.	Pos.	Nat.	Name	Age	Moving to	Type	Transfer window	Transfer fee	Source
23	MF	(United States)	Tori Huster	29	(United States) Washington Spirit	Loan return	Pre-season		
16	DF	(Australia)	Nikola Orgill	25	Canberra United	Transfer	Pre-season		
3	DF	(Australia)	Natasha Prior	25	Canberra United	Transfer	Pre-season		

== Pre-season and friendlies ==
20 December 2018	Newcastle Jets (Australia)	0–2	China	Gold Coast
		Report		Stadium: Cbus Super Stadium

23 December 2018	Newcastle Jets (Australia)	v	China	Gold Coast
		Report		Stadium: Cbus Super Stadium

== W-League ==
=== League table ===
Pos	Team	Pld	W	D	L	GF	GA	GD	Pts	Qualification
1	Melbourne Victory	12	7	3	2	21	15	+6	24	Qualification to Finals series and 2019 AFC Women's Club Championship
2	Brisbane Roar	12	6	2	4	18	17	+1	20	Qualification to Finals series
3	Sydney FC (C)	12	6	1	5	28	19	+9	19	Qualification to Finals series
4	Perth Glory	12	5	4	3	28	20	+8	19	Qualification to Finals series
5	Melbourne City	12	6	1	5	20	15	+5	19	
6	Adelaide United	12	5	3	4	17	19	−2	18	
7	Newcastle Jets	12	5	1	6	18	21	−3	16	
8	Canberra United	12	3	4	5	13	18	−5	13	
9	Western Sydney Wanderers	12	1	1	10	11	30	−19	4	

Source: A-Leagues
Rules for classification: 1) points; 2) goal difference; 3) number of goals scored.
(C) Champions

=== Matches ===
Win Draw Loss

1 November 2018 2	Melbourne Victory	2–1	Newcastle Jets	Melbourne
	Ayres 7'; Dowie 11'	Report	Vine 12'	Stadium: Lakeside Stadium; Attendance: 713; Referee: Rachel Mitchenson

17 November 2018 3	Newcastle Jets	1–0	Canberra United	Newcastle
	Vine 45+2'	Report		Stadium: McDonald Jones Stadium; Attendance: 1,343; Referee: Rebecca Durcau

24 November 2018 4	Western Sydney Wanderers	0–1	Newcastle Jets	Sydney
		Report	Kingsley 59'	Stadium: Marconi Stadium; Attendance: 652; Referee: Lara Lee

29 November 2018 5	Newcastle Jets	0–1	Brisbane Roar	Newcastle
		Report	Ubogagu 56'	Stadium: McDonald Jones Stadium; Attendance: 1,405; Referee: Rachel Mitchenson

9 December 2018 6	Newcastle Jets	1–3	Melbourne City	Newcastle
	Stengel 54'	Report	Kinga 30'; Butt 34'; Spencer 72'	Stadium: McDonald Jones Stadium; Attendance: 3,383; Referee: Casey Reibelt

15 December 2018 7	Perth Glory	2–2	Newcastle Jets	Perth
	McKenna 4'; Kerr 29' (pen.)	Report	Stengel 17', 18'	Stadium: Dorrien Gardens; Attendance: 652; Referee: Lara Lee

31 December 2018 9	Newcastle Jets	2–3	Adelaide United	Newcastle
	Collister 21'; Johns 85' (o.g.)	Report	Friðriksdóttir 57'; I. Hodgson 90+2'; Latsko 90+4'	Stadium: McDonald Jones Stadium; Attendance: 1,065; Referee: Casey Reibelt

4 January 2019 10	Sydney FC	3–1	Newcastle Jets	Sydney
	McCaskill 28', 90+5'; Ibini 77'	Report	Copus-Brown 82'	Stadium: Netstrata Jubilee Stadium; Attendance: 2,997; Referee: Katie Patterson

12 January 2019 11	Newcastle Jets	3–1	Perth Glory	Newcastle
	Wright 57'; Andrews 64'; Vine 90+2'	Report	Kerr 34'	Stadium: Newcastle Number 2 Sports Ground; Attendance: 1,876; Referee: Isabella Blaess

20 January 2019 12	Melbourne City	4–0	Newcastle Jets	Melbourne
	Kinga 31' (pen.), 58'; Catley 37'; Mace 69'	Report		Stadium: CB Smith Reserve; Attendance: 425; Referee: Katie Patterson

25 January 2019 13	Adelaide United	1–2	Newcastle Jets	Adelaide
	Friðriksdóttir 29'	Report	Wright 22' (pen.); Petratos 90+1'	Stadium: Marden Sports Complex; Attendance: 842; Referee: Rebecca Durcau

2 February 2019 14	Newcastle Jets	4–1	Western Sydney Wanderers	Newcastle
	Tamplin 43'; Andrews 55'; Collister 70'; Vine 79'	Report	Addo 66'	Stadium: No.2 Sportsground; Attendance: 1,209; Referee: Georgia Ghirardello

=== Results summary ===
Overall								Home						Away					
Pld	W	D	L	GF	GA	GD	Pts	W	D	L	GF	GA	GD	W	D	L	GF	GA	GD
12	5	1	6	18	21	−3	16	3	0	3	11	9	+2	2	1	3	7	12	−5

Last updated: February 2019, end of regular season.
Source: Competitive Matches

=== Results by round ===
Round	1	2	3	4	5	6	7	8	9	10	11	12	13	14
Ground	B	A	H	A	H	H	A	B	H	A	H	A	A	H
Result	✖	L	W	W	L	L	D	✖	L	L	W	L	W	W
Position	7	8	7	4	6	8	7	8	8	8	8	8	7	7

Updated to match(es) played on February 2019. Source: Competitive Matches
A = Away; H = Home; B = Bye; W = Win; D = Draw; L = Loss
