= 2019–20 W-League =

Twelfth edition of the top Australian women's football (soccer) league

W-League
- Season: 2019–20
- Champions: Melbourne City
- Premiers: Melbourne City
- Matches: 57
- Goals: 153 (2.68 per match)
- Top goalscorer: Morgan Andrews; Natasha Dowie; Kristen Hamilton; Remy Siemsen (7 goals each)
- Longest winning run: 13 matches Melbourne City
- Longest unbeaten run: 14 matches Melbourne City
- Longest winless run: 8 matches Adelaide United
- Longest losing run: 6 matches Adelaide United
- All statistics correct as of 21 March 2020.

The 2019–20 W-League season was the twelfth season of the W-League, the Australian national women's association football competition. Nine teams competed in the league, with most of the players from Australia but 33 of them from 11 other countries.

Melbourne City was undefeated through the regular season, the third time this has occurred in the W-League and the second time it has been achieved by Melbourne City.

The 2019–20 Australian bushfire season has had a significant impact on the season. Apart from the need to defer a few matches, there were a number of matches that were played in a smoke haze, with some players requiring asthma medication during the matches.

The grand final was played behind closed doors, due to the impacts from the COVID-19 pandemic in Australia.

The season was also notable for the number of high-profile players who left the W-League to join English teams. This included Sam Kerr moving to Chelsea, Hayley Raso to Everton, Caitlin Foord to Arsenal and Chloe Logarzo to Bristol City.

== Clubs ==
=== Stadia and locations ===
Team	Location	Stadium	Capacity
Adelaide United	Adelaide	Marden Sports Complex; Coopers Stadium	6,000; 16,500
Brisbane Roar	Brisbane	Suncorp Stadium; Lions Stadium	52,500; 5,000
Canberra United	Canberra	McKellar Park; Seiffert Oval	3,500; 15,000
Melbourne City	Melbourne	CB Smith Reserve; AAMI Park	2,000; 30,050
Melbourne Victory	Melbourne	Lakeside Stadium; Epping Stadium; AAMI Park; Latrobe City Stadium; Marvel Stadium	12,000; 10,000; 30,050; 12,000; 56,347
Newcastle Jets	Newcastle	Newcastle Number 2 Sports Ground; McDonald Jones Stadium	5,000; 33,000
Perth Glory	Perth; Bunbury	Dorrien Gardens; Hay Park	4,000 –
Sydney FC	Sydney Wollongong	Seymour Shaw; Jubilee Oval; Leichhardt Oval; WIN Stadium	5,000; 20,505; 20,000; 23,000
Western Sydney Wanderers	Sydney	Marconi Stadium; ANZ Stadium; Spotless Stadium	9,000; 83,500; 24,000

=== Personnel and kits ===
Team	Manager	Captain	Kit manufacturers	Kit sponsors
Adelaide United	(Australia) Ivan Karlović	(United States) Amber Brooks	Macron	SA Power Networks
Brisbane Roar	(Australia) Jake Goodship	(Australia) Clare Polkinghorne	Umbro	Brisbane Airport
Canberra United	(Australia) Heather Garriock	(Australia) Nikola Orgill (Australia) Karly Roestbakken	Viva Teamwear	University of Canberra; Drake International (Note: Back of shorts sponsor)
Melbourne City	(Australia) Rado Vidošić	(Australia) Steph Catley	Puma	Etihad Airways
Melbourne Victory	(Wales) Jeff Hopkins	(England) Natasha Dowie	Adidas	Back in Motion
Newcastle Jets	(Australia) Ashley Wilson	(Australia) Cassidy Davis (Australia) Gema Simon (Australia) Clare Wheeler	Viva Teamwear	Greater Bank; City of Newcastle (Note: Back sponsor)
Perth Glory	(Australia) Bobby Despotovski	(Australia) Natasha Rigby	Macron	BHP
Sydney FC	(Australia) Ante Juric	(Australia) Teresa Polias	Under Armour	The Star
Western Sydney Wanderers	(Australia) Dean Heffernan	(Australia) Erica Halloway	Nike	Intermain

=== Managerial changes ===
Team	Outgoing manager	Manner of departure	Position on table	Incoming manager	Date of appointment	Ref.
Western Sydney Wanderers	(Australia) Dan Barrett	End of contract	Pre-season	(Australia) Dean Heffernan	24 April 2019	
Brisbane Roar	(Australia) Melissa Andreatta	Quit	Pre-season	(Australia) Jake Goodship	3 September 2019	
Newcastle Jets	(Australia) Craig Deans	Assigned caretaker of men's squad	7th 8th	(Australia) Ashley Wilson (interim) (full-time)	13 January 2020; 22 February 2020	

=== Foreign players ===
Club	Visa 1	Visa 2	Visa 3	Visa 4	Non-Visa foreigner(s)	Former player(s)
Adelaide United	(Brazil) Lais Araujo	(United States) Julia Ashley	(United States) Amber Brooks	(United States) Mallory Weber		
Brisbane Roar	(United States) Rylee Baisden	(United States) Celeste Boureille	(United States) Shea Connors	(United States) Carson Pickett		
Canberra United	(Brazil) Camila	(United States) Simone Charley	(United States) Kaleigh Kurtz	(United States) Katie Stengel	(Norway) Elise Thorsnes^{R}	
Melbourne City	(Japan) Yukari Kinga	(Scotland) Claire Emslie	(Serbia) Milica Mijatović	(United States) Lauren Barnes	(New Zealand) Rebekah Stott^{A} (United States) Ally Watt^{G}	
Melbourne Victory	(England) Natasha Dowie	(United States) Haley Hanson	(United States) Darian Jenkins	(United States) Emily Menges	(New Zealand) Annalie Longo^{A}	
Newcastle Jets						
Perth Glory	(Mexico) Arianna Romero	(Spain) Celia Jiménez Delgado	(United States) Morgan Andrews	(United States) Crystal Thomas	(Philippines) Stacey Cavill^{A}	
Sydney FC	(Canada) Lindsay Agnew	(United States) Aubrey Bledsoe	(United States) Sofia Huerta	(United States) Veronica Latsko		
Western Sydney Wanderers	(United States) Kristen Hamilton	(United States) Abby Smith	(United States) Sam Staab			(Republic of Ireland) Denise O'Sullivan^{G} (United States) Lynn Williams

The following do not fill a Visa position:
^{A} Australian citizens who have chosen to represent another national team;
^{G} Guest Players;
^{R} Injury Replacement Players, or National Team Replacement Players

== Regular season ==
The regular season runs from 14 November 2019 to 1 March 2020, including a two-week break at the end of January and beginning of February. The season consists of 12 matches per team, 6 home and 6 away, usually with one match per week for each team. Because the league has an odd number of teams, at least one team each week does not play. In most weeks, the league has scheduled one match on Thursday and the remaining matches on Saturday and Sunday. To date, two matches have had to be rescheduled due to bushfires, either because of direct fire threat or because of smoke.

=== League table ===
Pos	Team	Pld	W	D	L	GF	GA	GD	Pts	Qualification
1	Melbourne City (C)	12	11	1	0	27	4	+23	34	Qualification to Finals series
2	Melbourne Victory	12	7	2	3	24	14	+10	23	Qualification to Finals series
3	Sydney FC	12	7	1	4	21	13	+8	22	Qualification to Finals series
4	Western Sydney Wanderers	12	7	1	4	24	20	+4	22	Qualification to Finals series
5	Brisbane Roar	12	5	2	5	22	19	+3	17	
6	Canberra United	12	4	1	7	13	29	−16	13	
7	Perth Glory	12	3	2	7	19	24	−5	11	
8	Adelaide United	12	2	1	9	12	24	−12	7	
9	Newcastle Jets	12	2	1	9	12	27	−15	7	

Source: A-Leagues
Rules for classification: 1) points; 2) goal difference; 3) number of goals scored.
(C) Champions

=== Results ===
Home \ Away	ADE	BRI	CNU	MCY	MVC	NEW	PER	SYD	WSW
Adelaide United			1–2		0–3	2–1	2–2	0–1	3–2
Brisbane Roar	3–2		5–0	0–2	2–3	2–1			1–3
Canberra United	3–1	1–2		1–2			2–0	0–4	0–4
Melbourne City	1–0	3–1	4–0		1–0	2–0	1–0		
Melbourne Victory		0–0	3–0	0–4		2–1		3–1	1–1
Newcastle Jets	2–0		2–3	1–1	0–7		2–4	0–2	
Perth Glory		4–2	1–1		1–2	1–2		1–3	2–3
Sydney FC	2–0	0–0		1–2	3–0		1–2		3–0
Western Sydney Wanderers	2–1	0–4		0–4		1–0	3–1	5–0	

Source: W-League
Legend: Blue = home team win; Yellow = draw; Red = away team win.

== Fixtures ==
=== Round 1 ===
14 November 2019	Western Sydney Wanderers	2–1	Adelaide United	Sydney
19:30 AEDT	Hamilton 44'; Cooney-Cross 90+2'	Report	M. Fowler 39' (pen.)	Stadium: Marconi Stadium; Attendance: 787; Referee: Rebecca Durcau

17 November 2019	Sydney FC	3–0	Melbourne Victory	Sydney
16:00 AEDT	Siemsen 4', 22'; Evans 90+2'	Report		Stadium: Netstrata Jubilee Stadium; Attendance: 3,219; Referee: Kate Jacewicz

17 November 2019	Canberra United	2–0	Perth Glory	Canberra
	Charley 6', 11'	Report		Stadium: McKellar Park; Attendance: 1,482; Referee: Isabella Blaess

17 November 2019	Newcastle Jets	1–1	Melbourne City	Newcastle
	Collister 67'	Report	van Egmond 22'	Stadium: Newcastle International Sports Centre; Attendance: 1,523; Referee: Lara Lee

=== Round 2 ===
21 November 2019	Brisbane Roar	2–3	Melbourne Victory	Brisbane
	Yallop 24'; Riley 80'	Report	Torpey 10' (o.g.); Dowie 14' (pen.), 76'	Stadium: Dolphin Oval; Attendance: 2,139; Referee: Rachel Mitchenson

22 November 2019	Western Sydney Wanderers	1–0	Newcastle Jets	Sydney
	Harrison 59' (pen.)	Report		Stadium: Bankwest Stadium; Attendance: 2,992; Referee: Kelly Jones

22 November 2019	Adelaide United	0–1	Sydney FC	Adelaide
		Report	Foord 56'	Stadium: Marden Sports Complex; Attendance: 784; Referee: Isabella Blaess

24 November 2019	Canberra United	1–2	Melbourne City	Canberra
	Stengel 59'	Report	Mijatović 67'; van Egmond 90+4' (pen.)	Stadium: McKellar Park; Attendance: 1,293; Referee: Georgia Ghirardello

=== Round 3 ===
28 November 2019	Brisbane Roar	1–3	Western Sydney Wanderers	Brisbane
	Baisden 55'	Report	Hamilton 10', 45', 64'	Stadium: Lions Stadium; Attendance: 2,535; Referee: Isabella Blaess

30 November 2019	Newcastle Jets	2–3	Canberra United	Newcastle
	Andrews 41' (pen.), 45+1' (pen.)	Report	Crofts 29'; Charley 32'; Thorsnes 81'	Stadium: McDonald Jones Stadium; Attendance: 3,446; Referee: Isabella Libri

30 November 2019	Melbourne City	1–0	Adelaide United	Shepparton
	Simon 8'	Report		Stadium: John McEwan Reserve; Attendance: 500; Referee: Georgia Ghirardello

1 December 2019	Perth Glory	1–3	Sydney FC	Perth
	Doeglas 46'	Report	Siemsen 3', 6'; Foord 39' (pen.)	Stadium: Dorrien Gardens; Attendance: 797; Referee: Rachel Mitchenson

=== Round 4 ===
5 December 2019	Canberra United	1–2	Brisbane Roar	Canberra
	Thorsnes 66'	Report	Yallop 17'; Raso 41'	Stadium: McKellar Park; Attendance: 1,185; Referee: Isabella Blaess

7 December 2019	Melbourne Victory	1–1	Western Sydney Wanderers	Melbourne
	Hanson 8'	Report	Williams 62'	Stadium: Latrobe City Stadium; Attendance: 443; Referee: Kelly Jones

7 December 2019	Perth Glory	1–2	Newcastle Jets	Perth
	Celia 57'	Report	Flannery 23'; Andrews 46'	Stadium: Dorrien Gardens; Referee: Lara Lee

8 December 2019	Sydney FC	1–2	Melbourne City	Sydney
	Huerta 40'	Report	van Egmond 3'; Mijatović 76'	Stadium: Cromer Park; Attendance: 2,690; Referee: Rachel Mitchenson

=== Round 5 ===
12 December 2019	Melbourne City	1–0	Melbourne Victory	Melbourne
	Kinga 89'	Report		Stadium: ABD Stadium; Attendance: 907; Referee: Isabella Blaess

13 December 2019	Perth Glory	1–1	Canberra United	Perth
	K. Carroll 90'	Report	Charley 15'	Stadium: Dorrien Gardens; Attendance: 365; Referee: Georgia Ghirardello

14 December 2019	Brisbane Roar	3–2	Adelaide United	Brisbane
	Riley 4'; Raso 12', 83'	Report	M. Fowler 25'; Weber 76'	Stadium: Lions Stadium; Attendance: 1,682; Referee: Lara Lee

15 December 2019	Newcastle Jets	0–2	Sydney FC	Newcastle
		Report	Siemsen 31', 50'	Stadium: McDonald Jones Stadium; Attendance: 2,513; Referee: Rachel Mitchenson

=== Round 6 ===
19 December 2019	Melbourne City	1–0	Perth Glory	Melbourne
	Stott 62'	Report		Stadium: ABD Stadium; Attendance: 600; Referee: Kelly Jones

20 December 2019	Western Sydney Wanderers	5–0	Sydney FC	Sydney
	Harrison 4'; Cooney-Cross 6', 42'; Williams 76', 87'	Report		Stadium: Bankwest Stadium; Attendance: 2,233; Referee: Lara Lee

21 December 2019	Melbourne Victory	0–0	Brisbane Roar	Melbourne
10:30 AEDT		Report		Stadium: Epping Stadium; Attendance: 406; Referee: Rachel Mitchenson

22 December 2019	Adelaide United	1–2	Canberra United	Adelaide
	Condon 90+3'	Report	L. Khamis 9'; Taylor-Young 78'	Stadium: Marden Sports Complex; Attendance: 693; Referee: Isabella Blaess

=== Round 7 ===
26 December 2019	Canberra United	0–4	Western Sydney Wanderers	Canberra
		Report	Cooney-Cross 38'; O'Sullivan 69'; Hamilton 81'; Williams 85'	Stadium: McKellar Park; Attendance: 1,243; Referee: Rebecca Durcau

28 December 2019	Perth Glory	1–2	Melbourne Victory	Perth
	McKenna 60'	Report	Jackson 33', 53'	Stadium: Dorrien Gardens; Attendance: 618; Referee: Isabella Blaess

29 December 2019	Sydney FC	2–0	Adelaide United	Sydney
	Brooks 77' (o.g.); Ibini 90'	Report		Stadium: Jubilee Oval; Attendance: 3,373; Referee: Kelly Jones

29 December 2019	Brisbane Roar	2–1	Newcastle Jets	Brisbane
	Polkinghorne 41'; Palmer 69'	Report	Andrews 22'	Stadium: Lions Stadium; Attendance: 2,189; Referee: Georgia Ghirardello

=== Round 8 ===
2 January 2020	Brisbane Roar	0–2	Melbourne City	Brisbane
		Report	Mijatović 6'; Luik 74'	Stadium: Dolphin Oval; Referee: Rachel Mitchenson

3 January 2020	Adelaide United	2–2	Perth Glory	Adelaide
	Dawber 38'; M. Fowler 45'	Report	Thomas 52'; Andrews 90+3' (pen.)	Stadium: Marden Sports Complex; Attendance: 565; Referee: Kate Jacewicz

5 January 2020	Melbourne Victory	2–1	Newcastle Jets	Melbourne
	Dowie 10'; Jenkins 25'	Report	Simon 61'	Stadium: AAMI Park; Attendance: 4,961; Referee: Rebecca Durcau

13 January 2020 (Note: Deferred from 5 January due to bushfire smoke.)	Canberra United	0–4	Sydney FC	Canberra
		Report	Siemsen 18'; Latsko 33'; Logarzo 49'; Huerta 83'	Stadium: McKellar Park; Attendance: 1,473; Referee: Lara Lee

=== Round 9 ===
9 January 2020	Melbourne City	4–0	Canberra United	Melbourne
	Simon 5', 45+4'; Emslie 33' van Egmond 76'	Report		Stadium: ABD Stadium; Attendance: 747; Referee: Kate Jacewicz

12 January 2020	Western Sydney Wanderers	0–4	Brisbane Roar	Sydney
		Report	Toby 50', 71'; Raso 61'; Davidson 68'	Stadium: Marconi Stadium; Attendance: 1,186; Referee: Rebecca Durcau

1 February 2020 (Note: Deferred from 10 January due to bushfire smoke.)	Newcastle Jets	2–0	Adelaide United	Newcastle
	Andrews 52' (pen.); Pountney 78'	Report		Stadium: McDonald Jones Stadium; Attendance: 513; Referee: Lara Lee

=== Round 10 ===
16 January 2020	Sydney FC	0–0	Brisbane Roar	Sydney
		Report		Stadium: Leichhardt Oval; Attendance: 1,397; Referee: Kelly Jones

18 January 2020	Adelaide United	0–3	Melbourne Victory	Adelaide
		Report	Dowie 17', 81'; Sutton 78'	Stadium: Marden Sports Complex; Attendance: 692; Referee: Rachel Mitchenson

18 January 2020	Melbourne City	2–0	Newcastle Jets	Melbourne
	Mijatovic 7'; van Egmond 50'	Report		Stadium: CB Smith Reserve; Attendance: 1,989; Referee: Rebecca Durcau

19 January 2020	Western Sydney Wanderers	3–1	Perth Glory	Sydney
	Cooper 3'; Vine 56'; Wallhead 86' (o.g.)	Report	Doeglas 53'	Stadium: Bankwest Stadium; Attendance: 3,024; Referee: Isabella Libri

=== Round 11 ===
23 January 2020	Newcastle Jets	2–4	Perth Glory	Newcastle
	Tamplin 75'; Allan 83'	Report	Lowry 22'; Andrews 45+2' (pen.); Doeglas 65'; Jiménez 78'	Stadium: McDonald Jones Stadium; Attendance: 828; Referee: Georgia Ghirardello

25 January 2020	Adelaide United	3–2	Western Sydney Wanderers	Adelaide
	Dawber 17'; Weber 39', 45+1'	Report	Staab 88'; Araujo 90+3' (o.g.)	Stadium: Marden Sports Complex; Attendance: 569; Referee: Isabella Blaess

26 January 2020	Melbourne Victory	3–0	Canberra United	Melbourne
	Ayres 31', 38'; Dowie 77'	Report		Stadium: Lakeside Stadium; Attendance: 562; Referee: Lara Lee

=== Round 12 ===
15 February 2020	Sydney FC	3–0	Western Sydney Wanderers	Sydney
	Latsko 2'; Brush 14'; Huerta 90+2'	Report		Stadium: Cromer Park; Attendance: 2,309; Referee: Lara Lee

16 February 2020	Perth Glory	4–2	Brisbane Roar	Perth
	Andrews 3', 25' (pen.); Thomas 12'; Norrie 90+3'	Report	Pickett 33'; Yallop 57'	Stadium: Dorrien Gardens; Attendance: 498; Referee: Casey Reibelt

16 February 2020	Canberra United	3–1	Adelaide United	Canberra
	Hughes 34'; Khamis 68'; Charley 80'	Report	I. Hodgson 45'	Stadium: McKellar Park; Attendance: 1,202; Referee: Georgia Ghirardello

16 February 2020	Melbourne Victory	0–4	Melbourne City	Melbourne
		Report	van Egmond 21'; Emslie 31', 50'; Simon 57'	Stadium: Lakeside Stadium; Attendance: 1,097; Referee: Rebecca Durcau

=== Round 13 ===
20 February 2020	Western Sydney Wanderers	0–4	Melbourne City	Sydney
		Report	Emslie 12' (pen.); Carpenter 30', 63'; Watt 86'	Stadium: Marconi Stadium; Attendance: 819; Referee: Rachel Mitchenson

22 February 2020	Sydney FC	1–2	Perth Glory	Wollongong
	K. Carroll 90+3' (o.g.)	Report	Andrews 41', 58'	Stadium: WIN Stadium; Referee: Kelly Jones

23 February 2020	Brisbane Roar	5–0	Canberra United	Brisbane
	Pickett 11', 82'; Baisden 16' (pen.), 90+2'; Conners 84'	Report		Stadium: Lions Stadium; Referee: Casey Reibelt

23 February 2020	Newcastle Jets	0–7	Melbourne Victory	Newcastle
		Report	Longo 3', 7'; Dowie 33'; Jenkins 40', 59'; Davis 69' (o.g.); Ayres 83'	Stadium: McDonald Jones Stadium; Attendance: 1,321; Referee: Isabella Blaess

=== Round 14 ===
27 February 2020	Adelaide United	2–1	Newcastle Jets	Adelaide
	Brooks 24'; Weber 61'	Report	Collister 37'	Stadium: Marden Sports Complex; Attendance: 832; Referee: Rebecca Mackie

29 February 2020	Melbourne Victory	3–1	Sydney FC	Melbourne
	Jackson 25'; Jenkins 49', 78'	Report	Tobin 90'	Stadium: Marvel Stadium; Attendance: 3,310; Referee: Casey Reibelt

29 February 2020	Perth Glory	2–3	Western Sydney Wanderers	Bunbury
	Jiménez 62'; Andrews 83'	Report	Staab 3'; Hamilton 11', 28'	Stadium: WML Stadium; Attendance: 1,175; Referee: Georgia Ghirardello

1 March 2020	Melbourne City	3–1	Brisbane Roar	Melbourne
	Mijatovic 34'; Watt 55', 69'	Report	Palmer 49'	Stadium: AAMI Park; Referee: Rebecca Durcau

== Finals series ==
The grand final was played behind closed doors, due to the impacts from the COVID-19 pandemic in Australia.

Semi-finals
1	Melbourne City	5
4	Western Sydney Wanderers	1
2	Melbourne Victory	0
3	Sydney FC	1

Grand Final
Melbourne City	1
Sydney FC	0

=== Semi-finals ===
14 March 2020	Melbourne Victory	0–1	Sydney FC	Melbourne
14:00 AEDT		Report	Latsko 14'	Stadium: Epping Stadium; Attendance: 704; Referee: Lara Lee

15 March 2020	Melbourne City	5–1	Western Sydney Wanderers	Melbourne
13:30 AEDT	Emslie 13'; Simon 22', 56'; Stott 41'; Nevin 62' (o.g.)	Report	Vine 51'	Stadium: ABD Stadium; Attendance: 612; Referee: Rachel Mitchenson

=== Grand final ===
21 March 2020	Melbourne City	1–0	Sydney FC	Melbourne
15:30 AEDT	Catley 15'	Report		Stadium: AAMI Park; Attendance: 0 (behind closed doors due to the COVID-19 pandemic in Australia); Referee: Rebecca Durcau

== Regular season statistics ==
=== Top scorers ===
As of 29 February 2020

Rank	Player	Club	Goals
1	(United States) Morgan Andrews	Perth Glory	7
1	(England) Natasha Dowie	Melbourne Victory	7
1	(United States) Kristen Hamilton	Western Sydney Wanderers	7
1	(Australia) Remy Siemsen	Sydney FC	7
5	(Australia) Emily van Egmond	Melbourne City	6
6	(Australia) Tara Andrews	Newcastle Jets	5
6	(United States) Simone Charley	Canberra United	5
6	(United States) Darian Jenkins	Melbourne Victory	5
6	(Serbia) Milica Mijatović	Melbourne City	5
10	(Australia) Kyra Cooney-Cross	Western Sydney Wanderers	4
10	(Scotland) Claire Emslie	Melbourne City	4
10	(Australia) Hayley Raso	Brisbane Roar	4
10	(Australia) Kyah Simon	Melbourne City	4
10	(United States) Mallory Weber	Adelaide United	4
10	(United States) Lynn Williams	Western Sydney Wanderers	4

=== Own goals ===
Player	Club	Against	Round
(Australia) Kaitlyn Torpey	Brisbane Roar	Melbourne Victory	2
(United States) Amber Brooks	Adelaide United	Sydney FC	7
(Australia) Isabella Wallhead	Perth Glory	Western Sydney Wanderers	10
(Brazil) Lais Araujo	Adelaide United	Western Sydney Wanderers	11
(Australia) Kim Carroll	Perth Glory	Sydney FC	13
(Australia) Cassidy Davis	Newcastle Jets	Melbourne Victory	13

=== Hat-tricks ===
Player	For	Against	Result	Date	Ref.
(United States) Kristen Hamilton	Western Sydney Wanderers	Brisbane Roar	3–1	28 November 2019	

=== Clean sheets ===
As of 23 February 2020

Rank	Player	Club	Clean sheets
1	(Australia) Lydia Williams	Melbourne City	8
2	(United States) Aubrey Bledsoe	Sydney FC	7
3	(Australia) Casey Dumont	Melbourne Victory	5
4	(Australia) Mackenzie Arnold	Brisbane Roar	4
5	(United States) Abby Smith	Western Sydney Wanderers	3
6	(Australia) Sham Khamis	Canberra United	1
6	(Australia) Claire Coelho	Newcastle Jets	1

== Monthly awards ==
Month	Player of the month		Coach of the month		Young player of the month	
Month	Name	Club	Name	Club	Name	Club
November 2019	(Australia) Remy Siemsen	Sydney FC	(Australia) Dean Heffernan	Western Sydney Wanderers	(Australia) Kyra Cooney-Cross	Western Sydney Wanderers
December 2019	(Republic of Ireland) Denise O'Sullivan	Western Sydney Wanderers	(Australia) Dean Heffernan	Western Sydney Wanderers	(Australia) Indiah-Paige Riley	Brisbane Roar
January 2020	(England) Natasha Dowie	Melbourne Victory	(Australia) Rado Vidošić	Melbourne City	(Australia) Ellie Carpenter	Melbourne City
February 2020	(United States) Morgan Andrews	Perth Glory	(Wales) Jeff Hopkins	Melbourne Victory	(Australia) Hollie Palmer	Brisbane Roar

== End-of-season awards ==
The following end of the season awards were announced at the 2019–20 Dolan Warren Awards night on 23 July 2020.

- Julie Dolan Medal – Kristen Hamilton (Western Sydney Wanderers)
- NAB Young Footballer of the Year – Ellie Carpenter (Melbourne City)
- Golden Boot Award – Morgan Andrews (Perth Glory), Kristen Hamilton (Western Sydney Wanderers), Remy Siemsen (Sydney FC), and Natasha Dowie (Melbourne Victory) (7 goals)
- Goalkeeper of the Year – Aubrey Bledsoe (Sydney FC) and Lydia Williams (Melbourne City)
- Coach of the Year – Rado Vidošić (Melbourne City)
- Fair Play Award – Melbourne Victory, Newcastle Jets, and Perth Glory
- Referee of the Year – Rebecca Durcau
- Goal of the Year – Amy Jackson (Melbourne Victory v Perth Glory, 28 December 2019)

== International competition ==
The W-League was represented in the first edition of the AFC Women's Club Championship, which took place from 26 to 30 November 2019 in Yongin, South Korea. Melbourne Victory were invited to participate in the tournament, as the Premiers of the 2018–19 season. They finished in last place with one point from their 3 matches.

As Premiers in 2019–20, Melbourne City qualify to the 2020 AFC Women's Club Championship.

== See also ==
- W-League transfers for 2019–20 season
- 2019–20 Adelaide United W-League season
- 2019–20 Melbourne City W-League season
- 2019–20 Melbourne Victory W-League season
- 2019–20 Newcastle Jets W-League season
- 2019–20 Perth Glory W-League season
- 2019–20 Sydney FC W-League season
