= 2014 Newcastle Jets FC (women) season =

Newcastle Jets WFC
2014 season
- Chairman: David Eland
- Manager: Peter McGuinness
- Stadium: Wanderers Oval
- W-League: 5th
- Top goalscorer: Rhali Dobson, Tara Andrews (6)
Home colours	Away colours

The 2014 Newcastle Jets FC W-League season was the club's seventh participation in the W-League, since the league's formation in 2008.

== Players ==
=== Squad information ===
Note: Flags indicate national team as defined under FIFA eligibility rules; some limited exceptions apply. Players may hold more than one non-FIFA nationality.

No.	Pos.	Nation	Player
1	GK	AUS	Hannah Southwell
2	MF	AUS	Georgia Yeoman-Dale
3	MF	AUS	Hayley Crawford
4	MF	AUS	Ashley Spina
5	DF	USA	Katherine Reynolds
6	MF	USA	Angela Salem
7	MF	USA	Tori Huster
8	MF	AUS	Amber Neilson
9	FW	AUS	Tara Andrews (Vice-Captain)
10	MF	AUS	Emily van Egmond (Captain)

No.	Pos.	Nation	Player
11	FW	AUS	Rhali Dobson
12	DF	AUS	Sophie Nenadovic
15	MF	AUS	Libby Copus-Brown
16	FW	AUS	Cassidy Davis
17	DF	AUS	Grace MacIntyre
18	DF	AUS	Clare Wheeler
19	FW	AUS	Emma Stanbury
20	GK	AUS	Claire Coelho
21	GK	AUS	Renee Rudder
–	DF	ENG	Stacey Day

=== Transfers in ===
Note: Flags indicate national team as defined under FIFA eligibility rules; some limited exceptions apply. Players may hold more than one non-FIFA nationality.

No.	Pos.	Nation	Player
10	MF	AUS	Emily van Egmond (from (United States) Chicago Red Stars)
8	MF	AUS	Amber Neilson (from retirement)
3	MF	AUS	Hayley Crawford (from retirement)
2	MF	AUS	Georgia Yeoman-Dale (from (Australia) Canberra United)
1	GK	AUS	Hannah Southwell (from (Australia) Emerging Jets Program)
19	FW	AUS	Emma Stanbury (from (Australia) North West Sydney Koalas)
5	DF	USA	Katherine Reynolds (from (United States) Western New York Flash)
6	MF	USA	Angela Salem (from (United States) Western New York Flash)
7	MF	USA	Tori Huster (from (United States) Washington Spirit)
21	GK	AUS	Renee Rudder (from (Australia) Sunshine Coast)

=== Transfers out ===
Note: Flags indicate national team as defined under FIFA eligibility rules; some limited exceptions apply. Players may hold more than one non-FIFA nationality.

No.	Pos.	Nation	Player
1	GK	AUS	Eliza Campbell (to (Norway) Medkila)
2	DF	AUS	Hannah Brewer (to (Australia) Melbourne Victory)
4	FW	AUS	Siahn Bozanic
5	DF	IRL	Ciara McCormack
7	MF	AUS	Gema Simon (to (Australia) Melbourne Victory)
8	MF	AUS	Madeline Searl
12	FW	ENG	Hannah Beard (to (Australia) Western Sydney Wanderers)
13	FW	AUS	Jasmine Courtenay
17	FW	AUS	Lauren Brown
19	FW	AUS	Adriana Jones
21	GK	AUS	Ainsley Buchanan

== Competitions ==
=== W-League ===
==== Fixtures ====
13 September 2014 1	Newcastle Jets	1–0	Melbourne Victory	Newcastle
15:00 AEST	Salem 47'	Report		Stadium: Wanderers Oval; Referee: Lara Smith

20 September 2014 2	Newcastle Jets	1–2	Perth Glory	Newcastle
15:00 AEST	Andrews 62'	Report	Tabain 34'; Kennedy 45+1'	Stadium: Wanderers Oval; Attendance: 673; Referee: Kelly Jones

27 September 2014 3	Brisbane Roar	3–1	Newcastle Jets	Brisbane
16:00 AEST	Gielnik 10'; Raso 28', 51'	Report	Dobson 78'	Stadium: Perry Park; Referee: Katie Patterson

5 October 2014 4	Adelaide United	0–4	Newcastle Jets	Adelaide
14:30 ACDT		Report	Huster 28' van Egmond 44'; Dobson 48', 74'	Stadium: Adelaide Shores Football Centre; Referee: Kelly Jones

11 October 2014 5	Newcastle Jets	0–1	Sydney FC	Newcastle
15:00 AEDT		Report	Spencer 28'	Stadium: Wanderers Oval

19 October 2014 6	Western Sydney Wanderers	1–5	Newcastle Jets	Sydney
15:00 AEDT	Carney 31'	Report	van Egmond 45+2'; Reynolds 47'; Andrews 51', 59'; Yeoman-Dale 75'	Stadium: Marconi Stadium; Referee: Katie Patterson

25 October 2014 7	Newcastle Jets	4–1	Brisbane Roar	Newcastle
13:00 AEDT	Huster 36' van Egmond 37', 67' (pen.); Alleway 48' (o.g.)	Report	Butt 90'	Stadium: Wanderers Oval; Attendance: 562; Referee: Rebecca Durcau

29 November 2014 8	Newcastle Jets	2–0	Adelaide United	Newcastle
15:00 AEDT	Huster 9'; Dobson 64'	Report		Stadium: Wanderers Oval; Referee: Rachel Mitchenson

8 November 2014 9	Perth Glory	4–2	Newcastle Jets	Perth
15:00 AWST	Foord 21'; Kerr 24', 45+4'; D'Ovidio 84'	Report	van Egmond 7'; Andrews 89'	Stadium: Ashfield Reserve; Referee: Katie Patterson

15 November 2014 10	Newcastle Jets	3–3	Canberra United	Newcastle
15:00 AEDT	Salem 7'; Dobson 68'; Andrews 89'	Report	Reynolds 13' (o.g.); Heyman 25'; Sykes 87'	Stadium: Wanderers Oval; Attendance: 627

22 November 2014 11	Melbourne Victory	4–0	Newcastle Jets	Melbourne
15:00 AEDT	Quigley 23', 46', 69'; Goad 31'	Report		Stadium: Kingston Heath Soccer Complex; Referee: Kelly Jones

6 December 2014 12	Sydney FC	2–2	Newcastle Jets	Sydney
17:00 AEDT	Harrison 22'; Simon 80' (pen.)	Report	Dobson 50'; Andrews 70'	Stadium: Lambert Park

==== League table ====
Pos	Team	Pld	W	D	L	GF	GA	GD	Pts	Qualification
1	Perth Glory	12	10	0	2	39	10	+29	30	Qualification to Finals series
2	Melbourne Victory	12	6	2	4	26	15	+11	20	Qualification to Finals series
3	Canberra United (C)	12	6	2	4	22	18	+4	20	Qualification to Finals series
4	Sydney FC	12	5	3	4	17	16	+1	18	Qualification to Finals series
5	Newcastle Jets	12	5	2	5	25	21	+4	17	
6	Brisbane Roar	12	4	2	6	18	19	−1	14	
7	Adelaide United	12	3	1	8	9	29	−20	10	
8	Western Sydney Wanderers	12	2	2	8	14	42	−28	8	

Source: au.soccerway.com
Rules for classification: 1) points; 2) goal difference; 3) number of goals scored.
(C) Champions

==== Results summary ====
Overall								Home						Away					
Pld	W	D	L	GF	GA	GD	Pts	W	D	L	GF	GA	GD	W	D	L	GF	GA	GD
12	5	2	5	25	21	+4	17	3	1	2	11	7	+4	2	1	3	14	14	0

Last updated: 6 December 2014.
Source: Competitive Matches

==== Results by round ====
Round	1	2	3	4	5	6	7	8	9	10	11	12
Ground	H	H	A	A	H	A	H	H	A	H	A	A
Result	W	L	L	W	L	W	W	W	L	D	L	D
Position	4	5	6	5	5	4	3	4	5	5	5	5

Updated to match(es) played on 6 December 2014. Source: Competitive Matches
A = Away; H = Home; W = Win; D = Draw; L = Loss

==== Goal scorers ====
Total	Player		Goals per Round											
Total	Player		1	2	3	4	5	6	7	8	9	10	11	12
6	(Australia)	Rhali Dobson			1	2				1		1		1
6	(Australia)	Tara Andrews		1				2			1	1		1
5	(Australia)	Emily van Egmond				1		1	2		1			
3	(United States)	Tori Huster				1			1	1				
2	(United States)	Angela Salem	1									1		
1	(United States)	Katherine Reynolds						1						
1	(Australia)	Georgia Yeoman-Dale						1						
1	Goal	Own goal							1					
25	TOTAL		1	1	1	4	0	5	4	2	2	3	0	2

== Awards ==
- Player of the Week (Round 4) – Rhali Dobson
- Newcastle Jets Player of the Year – Emily van Egmond
