= 2019–20 Melbourne City FC (women) season =

5th season in existence of Melbourne City FC (A-League Women)

Melbourne City (W-League)
2019–20 season
- Chairman: Khaldoon Al Mubarak
- Manager: Rado Vidošić
- Stadium: John McEwen Reserve; ABD Stadium; AAMI Park
- W-League: 1st
- W-League Finals: Winners
- Top goalscorer: Emily van Egmond; Kyah Simon (6 each)
- Highest home attendance: 4,724 vs. Brisbane Roar (1 March 2020); W-League
- Lowest home attendance: 500 vs. Adelaide United (30 November 2019); W-League
- Average home league attendance: 1,578
- Biggest win: 4–0 (3 times); 5–1 (once)
Home colours	Away colours	Third colours

The 2019–20 Melbourne City FC W-League season was the club's fifth season in the W-League, the premier competition for women's soccer in Australia. The team was based at the City Football Academy at La Trobe University and played home games at AAMI Park, CB Smith Reserve and ABD Stadium. Rado Vidošić was head coach of the club for the second consecutive year.

== Players ==
As of 24 November 2019

Note: Flags indicate national team as defined under FIFA eligibility rules; some limited exceptions apply. Players may hold more than one non-FIFA nationality.

No.	Pos.	Nation	Player
1	GK	AUS	Lydia Williams
2	DF	JPN	Yukari Kinga
3	DF	USA	Lauren Barnes
4	DF	AUS	Chelsea Blissett
6	MF	AUS	Aivi Luik
7	DF	AUS	Steph Catley (captain)
8	MF	AUS	Nia Stamatopoulos
9	FW	SCO	Claire Emslie (on loan from Orlando Pride)
10	MF	AUS	Emily van Egmond

No.	Pos.	Nation	Player
11	FW	AUS	Rhali Dobson
13	DF	NZL	Rebekah Stott
15	DF	AUS	Emma Checker
16	MF	AUS	Sofia Sakalis
17	FW	AUS	Kyah Simon (on loan from Houston Dash)
19	DF	AUS	Tyla-Jay Vlajnic
20	FW	SRB	Milica Mijatović
21	DF	AUS	Ellie Carpenter (on loan from Portland Thorns)
23	GK	AUS	Melissa Barbieri

Source: Melbourne City FC W-League Players

=== Notable signings ===
No.	Position	Player	Transferred from	Type/fee	Contract length	Date	Ref
10	MF	Emily van Egmond	(United States) Orlando Pride	Undisclosed	1 year	26 September 2019	
21	DF	Ellie Carpenter	(United States) Portland Thorns	Loan	1 year	29 October 2019	
9	FW	(Scotland) Claire Emslie	(United States) Orlando Pride	Loan	1 year	3 November 2019	
20	FW	(Serbia) Milica Mijatović	(Norway) Arna-Bjørnar	Undisclosed	1 year	11 November 2019	
13	DF	(New Zealand) Rebekah Stott	(Norway) Avaldsnes IL	Undisclosed	1 year	20 November 2019	
6	MF	Aivi Luik	(Norway) Avaldsnes IL	Undisclosed	1 year	20 November 2019	

== Competitions ==
=== Overall record ===
Competition	First match	Last match	Starting round	Final position	Record							
Competition	First match	Last match	Starting round	Final position	Pld	W	D	L	GF	GA	GD	Win %
W-League	17 November 2019	1 March 2020	Matchday 1	1st	12	11	1	0	27	4	+23	91.67
W-League Finals	15 March 2020	21 March 2020	Semi-finals	Winners	2	2	0	0	6	1	+5	100.00
Total					14	13	1	0	33	5	+28	92.86

Source: Soccerway

=== W-League ===
==== Results summary ====
Overall								Home						Away					
Pld	W	D	L	GF	GA	GD	Pts	W	D	L	GF	GA	GD	W	D	L	GF	GA	GD
12	11	1	0	27	4	+23	34	6	0	0	12	1	+11	5	1	0	15	3	+12

Source: KEEPUP

==== Results by round ====
Round	1	2	3	4	5	6	7	8	9	10	11	12	13	14
Ground	A	A	H	A	H	H	B	A	H	H	B	A	A	H
Result	D	W	W	W	W	W	B	W	W	W	B	W	W	W
Position	4	3	3	2	1	1	2	1	1	1	1	1	1	1
Points	1	4	7	10	13	16	16	19	22	25	28	28	31	34

Source: KEEPUP
A = Away; H = Home; B = Bye; W = Win; D = Draw; L = Loss

==== League table ====
Pos	Team	Pld	W	D	L	GF	GA	GD	Pts	Qualification
1	Melbourne City (C)	12	11	1	0	27	4	+23	34	Qualification to Finals series
2	Melbourne Victory	12	7	2	3	24	14	+10	23	Qualification to Finals series
3	Sydney FC	12	7	1	4	21	13	+8	22	Qualification to Finals series
4	Western Sydney Wanderers	12	7	1	4	24	20	+4	22	Qualification to Finals series
5	Brisbane Roar	12	5	2	5	22	19	+3	17	
6	Canberra United	12	4	1	7	13	29	−16	13	
7	Perth Glory	12	3	2	7	19	24	−5	11	
8	Adelaide United	12	2	1	9	12	24	−12	7	
9	Newcastle Jets	12	2	1	9	12	27	−15	7	

Source: A-Leagues
Rules for classification: 1) points; 2) goal difference; 3) number of goals scored.
(C) Champions

==== Matches ====
Win Draw Loss

17 November 2019 1	Newcastle Jets	1–1	Melbourne City	Newcastle
18:00 AEDT	Collister 67'	Report	van Egmond 22'	Stadium: Newcastle Number 2 Sports Ground; Attendance: 1,523; Referee: Kelly Jones

24 November 2019 2	Canberra United	1–2	Melbourne City	Canberra
16:00 AEDT	Stengel 59'	Report	Mijatović 67'; van Egmond 90+4' (pen.)	Stadium: McKellar Park; Attendance: 1,293; Referee: Georgia Ghirardello

30 November 2019 3	Melbourne City	1–0	Adelaide United	Shepparton
19:00 AEDT	Simon 8'	Report		Stadium: John McEwan Reserve; Attendance: 500; Referee: Georgia Ghirardello

8 December 2019 4	Sydney FC	1–2	Melbourne City	Sydney
16:00 AEDT	Huerta 40'	Report	van Egmond 3'; Mijatović 76'	Stadium: Cromer Park; Attendance: 2,690; Referee: Rachael Mitchenson

12 December 2019 5	Melbourne City	1–0	Melbourne Victory	Melbourne
19:30 AEDT	Kinga 89'	Report		Stadium: ABD Stadium; Attendance: 907; Referee: Isabella Blaess

19 December 2019 6	Melbourne City	1–0	Perth Glory	Melbourne
19:30 AEDT	Stott 62'	Report		Stadium: ABD Stadium; Attendance: 600; Referee: Kelly Jones

2 January 2020 8	Brisbane Roar	0–2	Melbourne City	Brisbane
18:30 AEST		Report	Mijatović 6'; Luik 74'	Stadium: Dolphin Stadium; Attendance: 2,693; Referee: Rachael Mitchenson

9 January 2020 9	Melbourne City	4–0	Canberra United	Melbourne
19:30 AEDT	Simon 5', 49' (pen.); Emslie 33' (pen.); van Egmond 76'	Report		Stadium: ABD Stadium; Attendance: 747; Referee: Kate Jacewicz

18 January 2020 10	Melbourne City	2–0	Newcastle Jets	Melbourne
17:00 AEDT	Mijatović 7'; van Egmond 50'	Report		Stadium: AAMI Park; Attendance: 1,989; Referee: Rebecca Durcau

13 February 2020 12	Melbourne Victory	0–4	Melbourne City	Melbourne
16:00 AEDT		Report	van Egmond 21'; Emslie 31', 50'; Simon 57'	Stadium: Lakeside Stadium; Attendance: 1,097; Referee: Rebecca Durcau

20 February 2020 13	Western Sydney Wanderers	0–4	Melbourne City	Sydney
19:30 AEDT		Report	Emslie 12' (pen.); Carpenter 30', 63'; Watt 86'	Stadium: Marconi Stadium; Attendance: 819; Referee: Rachael Mitchenson

1 March 2020 14	Melbourne City	3–1	Brisbane Roar	Melbourne
16:00 AEDT	Mijatović 34'; Watt 55', 69'	Report	Palmer 49'	Stadium: AAMI Park; Attendance: 4,724; Referee: Rebecca Durcau

==== Finals series ====
15 March 2020 Semi-finals	Melbourne City	5–1	Western Sydney Wanderers	Melbourne
13:30 AEDT	Emslie 13'; Simon 22', 56'; Stott 56'; Nevin 62' (o.g.)	Report	Vine 51'	Stadium: ABD Stadium; Attendance: 612; Referee: Rachael Mitchenson

21 March 2020 Grand Final	Melbourne City	1–0	Sydney FC	Melbourne
15:30 AEDT	Catley 15'	Report		Stadium: ABD Stadium; Attendance: 0 (behind closed doors due to COVID-19 pandemic in Australia); Referee: Rebecca Durcau
