= 2013–14 Newcastle Jets FC (women) season =

Newcastle Jets WFC
2013–14 season
- Chairman: David Eland
- Manager: Peter McGuinness
- Stadium: Wanderers Oval
- W-League: 8th
- Top goalscorer: Tara Andrews (3)
Home colours	Away colours

The 2013–14 Newcastle Jets FC W-League season was the club's sixth participation in the W-League, since the league's formation in 2008.

== Players ==
=== Squad information ===
Note: Flags indicate national team as defined under FIFA eligibility rules; some limited exceptions apply. Players may hold more than one non-FIFA nationality.

No.	Pos.	Nation	Player
1	GK	AUS	Eliza Campbell
2	DF	AUS	Hannah Brewer (Vice-Captain)
3	DF	ENG	Stacey Day
4	FW	AUS	Siahn Bozanic
5	DF	IRL	Ciara McCormack
6	MF	AUS	Ashley Spina
7	DF	AUS	Gema Simon (Captain)
8	MF	AUS	Madeline Searl
9	FW	AUS	Tara Andrews
10	FW	AUS	Rhali Dobson
11	DF	AUS	Grace MacIntyre

No.	Pos.	Nation	Player
12	FW	ENG	Hannah Beard
13	FW	AUS	Jasmine Courtenay
14	DF	AUS	Sophie Nenadovic
15	MF	AUS	Libby Copus-Brown
16	FW	AUS	Cassidy Davis
17	FW	AUS	Lauren Brown
18	DF	AUS	Claire Wheeler
19	FW	AUS	Adriana Jones
20	GK	AUS	Claire Coelho
21	GK	AUS	Ainsley Buchanan

=== Transfers in ===
Note: Flags indicate national team as defined under FIFA eligibility rules; some limited exceptions apply. Players may hold more than one non-FIFA nationality.

No.	Pos.	Nation	Player
12	FW	ENG	Hannah Beard (from (Australia) Brisbane Roar)
17	FW	AUS	Lauren Brown (from (Australia) Brisbane Roar)
6	MF	AUS	Ashley Spina (from (Australia) Brisbane Roar)
4	FW	AUS	Siahn Bozanic (from (Australia) Northbridge United)
15	MF	AUS	Libby Copus-Brown (from (Australia) Emerging Jets Program)
19	FW	AUS	Adriana Jones (from (Australia) Emerging Jets Program)
14	DF	AUS	Sophie Nenadovic (from (Australia) Emerging Jets Program)
16	FW	AUS	Cassidy Davis (from (Australia) Lake Macquarie)
21	GK	AUS	Ainsley Buchanan (from (Australia) Merewether United)
20	GK	AUS	Claire Coelho (from (Australia) Football Mid North Coast)
18	DF	AUS	Claire Wheeler
5	DF	IRL	Ciara McCormack

=== Transfers out ===
Note: Flags indicate national team as defined under FIFA eligibility rules; some limited exceptions apply. Players may hold more than one non-FIFA nationality.

No.	Pos.	Nation	Player
3	FW	AUS	Hayley Crawford (Retired)
10	MF	AUS	Emily van Egmond (to (United States) Seattle Reign FC)
6	MF	USA	Angela Salem (to (United States) Western New York Flash)
5	MF	USA	Tori Huster (to (United States) Washington Spirit)
12	MF	USA	Tiffany Boshers
14	DF	AUS	Sammara Schmitzer (to (Australia) Football Mid North Coast)
4	DF	AUS	Gemma Pearce (to (Australia) Lake Macquarie)
15	FW	AUS	Alisha Foote (to (Australia) Redlands United)
11	FW	AUS	Kate Hensman (to (Australia) Lake Macquarie)
14	MF	AUS	Bronte Bates
—	MF	AUS	Mikaela Howell
—	MF	AUS	Michaela Hatzirodos
20	GK	AUS	Alannah Rosewood

== Squad statistics ==
=== Disciplinary record ===
N	Pos.	Nat.	Name	Yellow card	Second yellow card	Red card	Notes
1	GK	(Australia)	Eliza Campbell	1	0	0	
2	DF	(Australia)	Hannah Brewer	1	0	0	
3	DF	(England)	Stacey Day	0	0	0	
4	FW	(Australia)	Siahn Bozanic	0	0	0	
5	DF	(Republic of Ireland)	Ciara McCormack	2	0	0	
6	MF	(Australia)	Ashley Spina	0	0	0	
7	DF	(Australia)	Gema Simon	0	0	0	
8	MF	(Australia)	Madeline Searl	1	0	0	
9	FW	(Australia)	Tara Andrews	0	0	0	
10	FW	(Australia)	Rhali Dobson	0	0	0	
11	DF	(Australia)	Grace MacIntyre	0	0	0	
12	FW	(England)	Hannah Beard	4	0	0	
13	FW	(Australia)	Jasmine Courtenay	0	0	0	
14	DF	(Australia)	Sophie Nenadovic	1	0	0	
15	MF	(Australia)	Libby Copus-Brown	0	0	0	
16	FW	(Australia)	Cassidy Davis	0	0	0	
17	FW	(Australia)	Lauren Brown	0	0	0	
18	FW	(Australia)	Claire Wheeler	0	0	0	
19	FW	(Australia)	Adriana Jones	0	0	0	
20	GK	(Australia)	Claire Coelho	0	0	0	
21	GK	(Australia)	Ainsley Buchanan	0	0	0	

Last updated: 10 February 2014
Source: Competitive matches
Only competitive matches
(yellow card) = Number of bookings; (second yellow card) = Number of sending offs after a second yellow card; (red card) = Number of sending offs by a direct red card.

=== Goal scorers ===
Total	Player		Goals per round											
Total	Player		1	2	3	4	5	6	7	8	9	10	11	12
3	(Australia)	Tara Andrews	1						1		1			
2	(Australia)	Rhali Dobson							1			1		
2	(England)	Hannah Beard	1											1
1	(Australia)	Jasmine Courtenay			1									
1	(Australia)	Sophie Nenadovic									1			
1	(Australia)	Gema Simon												1
10	Total		2	0	1	0	0	0	2	0	2	1	0	2

== Competitions ==
=== W-League ===
==== Pre-season ====
19 October 2013	Newcastle Jets	1–3	Sydney FC	Newcastle
Saturday 10:00 AEDT	Dobson 19'		Khamis 17'; Taylor 33'; Bolger 55'	Stadium: Adamstown Oval

==== Matches ====
9 November 2013 1	Newcastle Jets	2–5	Perth Glory	Newcastle
15:00 AEDT	Beard 5'; Andrews 35' (pen.)	Report	K. Gill 1'; McCallum 10'; Julien 66'; Sutton 81'; Tabain 90'	Stadium: Wanderers Oval; Attendance: 1,047; Referee: Katie Patterson

16 November 2013 2	Sydney FC	4–0	Newcastle Jets	Wollongong
15:00 AEDT	Rollason 45'; Kerr 68'; Taylor 80', 89'	Report		Stadium: WIN Stadium; Referee: Rebecca Durcau

30 November 2013 3	Adelaide United	3–1	Newcastle Jets	Adelaide
15:00 ACDT	Powell 25', 33'; Gummer 30'	Report	Courtenay 90+3'	Stadium: Burton Park; Attendance: 548; Referee: Lara Smith

7 December 2013 4	Melbourne Victory	6–0	Newcastle Jets	Melbourne
15:00 AEDT	Friend 30', 42', 68'; Koca 34'; Barilla 52', 70'	Report		Stadium: Kingston Heath Soccer Complex; Referee: Rachel Mitchenson

14 December 2013 5	Newcastle Jets	0–3	Canberra United	Newcastle
15:00 AEDT		Report	Ochs 11', 62'; Heyman 12'	Stadium: Wanderers Oval; Attendance: 429; Referee: Katie Patterson

22 December 2013 6	Western Sydney Wanderers	3–0	Newcastle Jets	Penrith
15:00 AEDT	O'Neill 45'; Cannuli 71', 76'	Report		Stadium: Centrebet Stadium; Referee: Rachel Mitchelson

4 January 2014 7	Newcastle Jets	2–6	Brisbane Roar	Newcastle
14:00 AEDT	Andrews 74' (pen.); Dobson 76'	Report	Popovic 17'; Gielnik 19', 32'; Butt 51'; Polkinghorne 62' (pen.); Raso 90'	Stadium: Wanderers Oval; Attendance: 450; Referee: Kelly Jones

11 January 2014 8	Newcastle Jets	0–3	Sydney FC	Newcastle
15:00 AEDT		Report	Bolger 15'; Foord 40', 78'	Stadium: Wanderers Oval; Referee: Rachel Mitchenson

18 January 2014 9	Perth Glory	3–2	Newcastle Jets	Perth
17:00 AWST	D'Ovidio 31'; Sutton 45+3'; Tabain 67'	Report	Andrews 20'; Nenadovic 28'	Stadium: Percy Doyle Reserve; Referee: Kirralee Andruschak

25 January 2014 10	Newcastle Jets	1–4	Melbourne Victory	Newcastle
11:00 AEDT	Dobson 74'	Report	De Vanna 12', 53', 56'; Catley 57'	Stadium: Adamstown Oval; Referee: Katie Patterson

1 February 2014 11	Canberra United	5–0	Newcastle Jets	Canberra
16:00 AEDT	Heyman 7'; Shipard 10'; Brush 28'; Yeoman-Dale 47'; Bisset 63'	Report		Stadium: McKellar Park; Attendance: 662; Referee: Rebecca Durcau

8 February 2014 12	Newcastle Jets	2–2	Adelaide United	Newcastle
15:00 AEDT	Beard 32'; G. Simon 90+1'	Report	Moore 10', 29'	Stadium: Wanderers Oval; Referee: Katie Patterson

==== League table ====
Pos	Team	Pld	W	D	L	GF	GA	GD	Pts	Qualification
1	Canberra United	12	9	0	3	28	8	+20	27	Qualification to Finals series
2	Sydney FC	12	8	2	2	37	14	+23	26	Qualification to Finals series
3	Melbourne Victory (C)	12	7	2	3	23	12	+11	23	Qualification to Finals series
4	Brisbane Roar	12	7	2	3	22	16	+6	23	Qualification to Finals series
5	Perth Glory	12	5	0	7	17	31	−14	15	
6	Adelaide United	12	3	4	5	12	15	−3	13	
7	Western Sydney Wanderers	12	2	3	7	17	23	−6	9	
8	Newcastle Jets	12	0	1	11	10	47	−37	1	

Source: au.soccerway.com
Rules for classification: 1) points; 2) goal difference; 3) number of goals scored.
(C) Champions

==== Results summary ====
Overall								Home						Away					
Pld	W	D	L	GF	GA	GD	Pts	W	D	L	GF	GA	GD	W	D	L	GF	GA	GD
12	0	1	11	10	47	−37	1	0	1	5	7	23	−16	0	0	6	3	24	−21

Last updated: 10 February 2014.
Source: Competitive Matches

==== Results by round ====
Round	1	2	3	4	5	6	7	8	9	10	11	12
Ground	H	A	A	A	H	A	H	H	A	H	A	H
Result	L	L	L	L	L	L	L	L	L	L	L	D
Position	6	8	8	8	8	8	8	8	8	8	8	8

Updated to match(es) played on 10 February 2014. Source: Competitive Matches
A = Away; H = Home; W = Win; D = Draw; L = Loss
