= John Ilhan Memorial Reserve =

Soccer stadium in Broadmeadows, Victoria

Nasiol Stadium
- John Ilhan Memorial Reserve
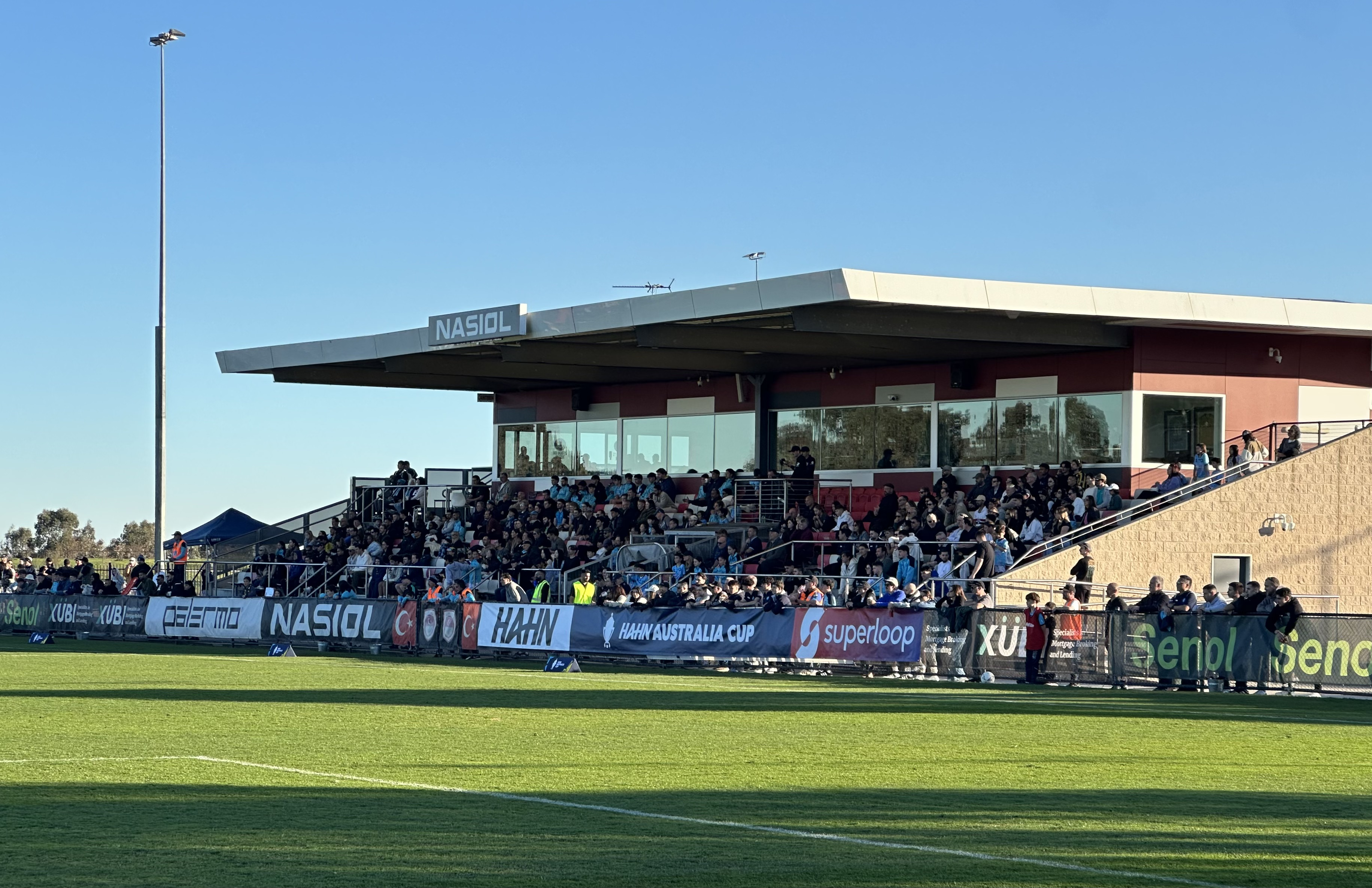
- Interactive map of Nasiol Stadium
- Former names: Broadmeadows Valley Park; Barry Road Recreation Reserve; ABD Stadium
- Location: Broadmeadows, Victoria
- Coordinates: 37°39′55″S 144°54′58″E
- Owner: City of Hume
- Capacity: 3,000 (Venue Capacity); 580 (Seating Capacity)
- Surface: Grass
- Public transit: ● Coolaroo; Hazeldene St/Barry Rd

Construction
- Opened: 2009
- Cost: $12.2 million

Tenants
- Hume City FC; Melbourne Victory Women (2014-2015)

John Ilhan Memorial Reserve, commercially known as Nasiol Stadium and formerly known as ABD Stadium and VPEC, Valley Park Events Centre and often referred to as Broadmeadows Valley Park, is an Australian soccer ground in Broadmeadows, a suburb of Melbourne, Victoria.

It is the home of Hume City FC. The venue has a capacity of 3,000 and is the only stadium in the City of Hume that is up to NPL standard. The ground is named in honour of former Crazy John's owner John Ilhan. There are four soccer fields, two of which are used for juniors and training purposes (one being a synthetic field). There is also a turf athletics track for long jump, javelin and discus with an infield soccer field. The main field contains a pavilion with underground state of the art change rooms used for senior training sessions and match days for Hume City FC. For sponsorship reasons the facility was commercially known as ABD Stadium from 2015 until 2021.
