= Ashlie Crofts =

Australian soccer player

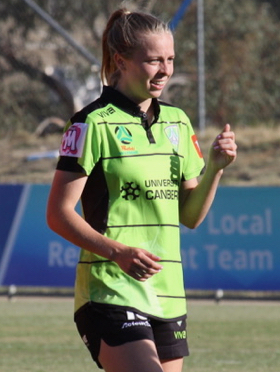
- Crofts in Canberra United in 2019

Personal information
- Full name: Ashlie Crofts
- Date of birth: 25 April 1998 (age 28)
- Place of birth: Australia
- Position: Midfielder

Team information
- Current team: Western Sydney Wanderers
- Number: 18

Senior career*
Years	Team	Apps	(Gls)
2015	Marconi Stallions		
2017–	Blacktown Spartans	63	(30)
2019–2021	Canberra United	9	(1)
2021–	Western Sydney Wanderers	1	(1)
- * Club domestic league appearances and goals as of 7 October 2021

Ashlie Crofts (born 24 April 1998) is a midfielder who plays for Western Sydney Wanderers in the A-League Women. She has previously played for Canberra United in the W-League.

== Club career ==
In addition to her soccer career she played futsal which she credits with helping her technical game.

In 2015 she began her senior career with Marconi Stallions, before moving to the Blacktown Spartans in the National Premier Leagues NSW where she came third in the golden boot with 16 goals.

Crofts was recruited by Canberra United for the 2019–20 W-League season. At the time she had thought the chance to play in the W-league had passed her by, but got a call from the coach Heather Garriock to join the team after seeing her perform in the NPL.

Crofts was a substitute in Canberra United's first match of the season, and got her first start in a match in the third round against Newcastle Jets where she scored her first goal in a 3–2 victory. This was Canberra United's first victory in 741 days.

In October 2021, Crofts joined her local club Western Sydney Wanderers for the 2021–22 A-League Women season.

== Honours ==
Individual

- National Premier Leagues NSW Women's Reserves Golden Boot: 2017 (15 goals)
