= Clare Wheeler =

Australian soccer player (born 1998)

Personal information
- Full name: Clare May Wheeler
- Date of birth: 14 January 1998 (age 28)
- Place of birth: Coffs Harbour, New South Wales, Australia
- Height: 1.62 m (5 ft 4 in)
- Position: Defensive midfielder

Team information
- Current team: Everton
- Number: 7

Youth career
- Adamstown Rosebud

Senior career*
Years	Team	Apps	(Gls)
2013–2020	Newcastle Jets	67	(0)
2020–2021	Sydney FC	12	(4)
2021–2023	Fortuna Hjørring	21	(2)
2022–2023	→ Everton (loan)	4	(0)
2023–	Everton	79	(0)

International career^{‡}
2015	Australia U20	10	(1)
2021–	Australia	44	(4)
- * Club domestic league appearances and goals as of 03:53, 9 September 2026 (UTC) ‡ National team caps and goals as of 11:23, 13 October 2026 (UTC)

Clare May Wheeler (born 14 January 1998) is an Australian professional soccer player who plays as a midfielder for Women's Super League club Everton and the Australia national team. She has represented Australia on the under-20 team.

== Early life ==
Wheeler began playing soccer at age ten for a local club, the Adamstown Rosebud. At the age of 13, she was selected for the state youth league, Northern NSW. She was later selected for the Emerging Jets Program.

== Club career ==
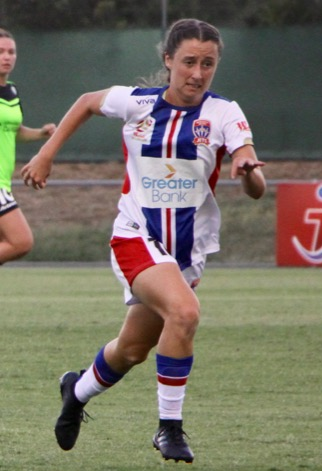
Wheeler playing for Newcastle Jets against Canberra United in 2018.

=== Newcastle Jets ===
In 2013 at the age of 15, Wheeler was selected to play for the Newcastle Jets for the 2013–14 Newcastle Jets W-League season. She made six appearances for the club playing primarily as a defender. The Jets finished in last place during the regular season with a 0–11–1 record. During the 2014 season, Wheeler made five appearances. The Jets finished in fifth place with a 5–5–2 record.

During the 2015-16 season, Wheeler made 11 appearances for the Jets. The club finished in sixth place with a 3–5–4 record. Returning to the Jets for the 2016-17 season, Wheeler made appearances in 11 of the 12 regular season matches. The Jets finished the season in fifth place with a 4–5–3 record.

=== Sydney FC ===
Wheeler left Newcastle Jets to join Sydney FC ahead of the 2020–21 W-League season.

=== Fortuna Hjørring ===
In June 2021, Wheeler left Australia to join Danish champions Fortuna Hjørring.

=== Everton ===
In August 2022, Wheeler was loaned to English club Everton. In January 2023, at the end of her loan, she was signed by the club on a permanent basis.

== International career ==
In 2015, Wheeler was selected for the Young Matildas (under-20 national team) to compete at the 2015 AFC U-19 Women's Championship tournament in China.

In 2021, Wheeler made her debut for the senior team in a friendly against the Republic of Ireland. Wheeler scored her first international goal for the Matildas against the Philippines in winning an Olympic qualifying match 8–0 in Perth on 29 October 2023. Jake Santa Maria of The West Australian observed, "Wheeler, has scored perhaps the best of the lot. She allowed herself one touch on the edge of the box before swinging one home. It is her first goal as a Matilda."

On 4 June 2024, Wheeler was named in the Matildas team which qualified for the Paris 2024 Olympics, her debut Olympics selection.

== Personal life ==
Wheeler graduated Newcastle High School with an ATAR of 90, and graduated from the University of Sydney with a Bachelor of Commerce, and worked in financial assistance at Macquarie Group after completing her university studies. At the University of Sydney, she was an alumnus of St Andrew's College, alongside her best friend and Australia national team teammate Clare Hunt (a centre back for Tottenham Hotspur).

Since 2021, Wheeler has been in a relationship with Jeremy Ord. The couple got engaged in 2025.

== Career statistics ==
=== Club ===
As of match played 6 September 2026

Appearances and goals by club, season and competition
Club	Season	League			National cup (Note: includes Danish Women's Cup, Women's FA Cup)		League cup (Note: includes FA Women's League Cup)		Total	
Club	Season	Division	Apps	Goals	Apps	Goals	Apps	Goals	Apps	Goals
Newcastle Jets	2013–14	W-League	6	0	—		—		6	0
Newcastle Jets	2014–15	W-League	5	0	—		—		5	0
Newcastle Jets	2015–16	W-League	11	0	—		—		11	0
Newcastle Jets	2016–17	W-League	11	0	—		—		11	0
Newcastle Jets	2017–18	W-League	11	0	—		—		11	0
Newcastle Jets	2018–19	W-League	12	0	—		—		12	0
Newcastle Jets	2019–20	A-League	11	0	—		—		11	0
Newcastle Jets	Total		67	0	0	0	0	0	67	0
Sydney FC	2020–21	A-League	12	4	—		—		12	4
Fortuna Hjørring	2021–22	Kvindeligaen	21	2	5	0	—		26	2
Everton	2022–23	Women's Super League	17	0	1	0	3	0	21	0
Everton	2023–24	Women's Super League	22	0	3	0	4	0	29	0
Everton	2024–25	Women's Super League	19	0	1	0	2	0	22	0
Everton	2025–26	Women's Super League	20	0	2	0	3	0	25	0
Everton	2026–27	Women's Super League	1	0	0	0	0	0	1	0
Everton	Total		79	0	7	0	12	0	98	0
Career total			173	6	12	0	12	0	203	6

=== International ===
As of match played 13 October 2026

Appearances and goals by national team and year
National team	Year	Apps	Goals
Australia	2021	5	0
Australia	2022	7	0
Australia	2023	6	1
Australia	2024	9	1
Australia	2025	8	0
Australia	2026	9	2
Total		44	4

Scores and results list Australia's goal tally first, score column indicates score after each Wheeler goal.

List of international goals scored by Clare Wheeler
No.	Date	Venue	Opponent	Score	Result	Competition
1.	29 October 2023	Perth Stadium, Perth, Australia	Philippines	8–0	8–0	2024 AFC Women's Olympic Qualifying Tournament
2.	3 June 2024	Stadium Australia, Sydney, Australia	China	1–0	2–0	Friendly
3.	15 April 2026	Nyayo National Stadium, Nairobi, Kenya	Kenya	2–0	2–0	2026 FIFA Series
4.	13 October 2026	Stade Walter-Luzi, Chambly, France	Haiti	6–1	7–1	Friendly

== Honours ==
Sydney FC

- W-League: 2020-21

Fortuna Hjørring

- A-Liga: 2021-22
- Danish Women's Cup 2021-22

Australia

- FIFA Series: 2026
