= Teigan Collister =

Australian soccer player

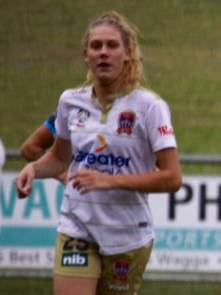

Personal information
- Full name: Teigan Collister
- Date of birth: 25 January 2000 (age 26)
- Place of birth: Sydney, Australia
- Height: 1.70 m (5 ft 7 in)
- Position: Winger

Senior career*
Years	Team	Apps	(Gls)
2018–2020	Newcastle Jets	22	(4)
2020–2022	Western Sydney Wanderers	22	(1)
2022–2023	Sydney Olympic	26	(1)
2023–2024	Sydney FC	5	(0)

International career
2017	Australia U20	1	(0)
- * Club domestic league appearances and goals as of 17 May 2024

Teigan Collister (born 25 January 2000) is an Australian soccer player who last played for Sydney FC in the A-League Women. She has previously played for Newcastle Jets and Western Sydney Wanderers.

== Club career ==
=== Newcastle Jets ===
Collister played her first season in 2018–19, where she played in 11 games and started in 5 of those, scoring twice. One of those goals was selected as the goal of the round against Western Sydney Wanderers in the final round of the season.

Collister was in a group of three who were the last players to be added to the Jets' list for the 2018–19 season, and she was seen as an unknown quantity, but in a season that was marred with suspensions and injury the Jets were forced to promote their younger players, including Collister. Her playing style was seen as less predictable by her coach Craig Deans, but signed her on the back of her enthusiasm and raw talent.

She was re-signed by Newcastle for the 2019–20 season.

=== Western Sydney Wanderers ===
In October 2020, Collister joined Western Sydney Wanderers.

In August 2021, Western Sydney Wanderers announced the re-signing of forward Teigan Collister for 2021–22 A-League Women season

=== Sydney FC ===
In January 2023, Collister joined Sydney FC until the end of the 2022–23 A-League Women season. At the end of the 2023–24 A-League Women season, in May 2024, Collister departed the club.

== International career ==
Australian U20 vs Canada 2017
