= Craig Deans =

Australian former soccer player

Personal information
- Full name: Craig Deans
- Date of birth: 7 May 1974 (age 52)
- Place of birth: Perth, Western Australia
- Height: 1.87 m (6 ft 1 1/2 in)
- Position: Centre back

Senior career*
Years	Team	Apps	(Gls)
1998	Western Knights		
1998–1999	Perth Glory	19	(1)
1999–2000	Carlton SC	36	(0)
2000–2004	Perth Glory	59	(3)
2003–2004	Newcastle United	18	(1)
2005–2007	Newcastle Jets	2	(0)

Managerial career
- 2008–2010: Newcastle Jets Youth
- 2010–2011: Newcastle Jets (assistant)
- 2011: Newcastle Jets (interim)
- 2011–2014: Newcastle Jets (assistant)
- 2014–2015: Newcastle Jets Youth
- 2015–2020: Newcastle Jets FC W-League
- 2020: Newcastle Jets (interim)
- 2020–2021: Newcastle Jets (interim)
- 2021: Newcastle Jets
- 2022–: Cooks Hill United (technical director) & (assistant)
- * Club domestic league appearances and goals

Craig Deans (born 7 May 1974) is an Australian former soccer player and former head coach of the Newcastle Jets.

== Playing career ==
Deans was a central defender for multiple Australian clubs, with most of his appearances coming in the National Soccer League. He made only two appearances in the A-League before a long period of injury Deans forced him into retirement as a professional player in 2007. He had success with the Perth Glory, winning two titles at the club.

== Coaching career ==
In 2008, Deans became the inaugural youth team coach for the Newcastle Jets for their team in the new A-League National Youth League.

On 5 October 2011, he was appointed interim manager of the Newcastle Jets after the sacking of Branko Culina. He returned to his previous job when a full time manager was appointed.

In 2014 he took over the club's youth team, and then in 2015 he became the head coach of the Women's team.

In the 2015/16 W-League season he won the Coach of the Year award for rebuilding a Newcastle Jets team that had senior players Emily van Egmond, Hayley Crawford, Tori Huster, Angela Salem, Katherine Reynolds and Amber Neilson all exit the club in the off-season.

After the sacking of Ernie Merrick in Round 13 of the 2019/20 A-League season he once again took the role of interim manager. He had the role for 5 games, with 1 win, 1 draw and 3 defeats and did not apply for the role on a full-time basis. After Carl Robinson was appointed Deans went back to his usual role as an assistant coach.

=== Newcastle Jets Head Coaching Appointment ===
When Robinson joined the Western Sydney Wanderers after they had sacked Jean-Paul de Marigny prior to the start of the Covid delayed 2020/21 season, Deans once again took the interim head coaching role with his first game a 1–0 loss to the Central Coast Mariners on New Year's Eve, 31 December 2020. Unlike earlier occasions Deans applied to take over the head coaching role permanently. After 7 games his side had 2 wins, 1 draw and 4 losses then on Wednesday 10 February 2021 he was appointed on a two-year contract as the full time head coach.

On 3 June 2021, Deans announced that he would be resigning as the manager of the Newcastle Jets at the conclusion of the season.

== Honours ==
With Perth Glory:

- NSL Championship: 2002–2003, 2003–2004

With Newcastle Jets:

- W-League Coach of the Year : 2015–16
