= Milica Mijatović =

Serbian footballer (born 1991)

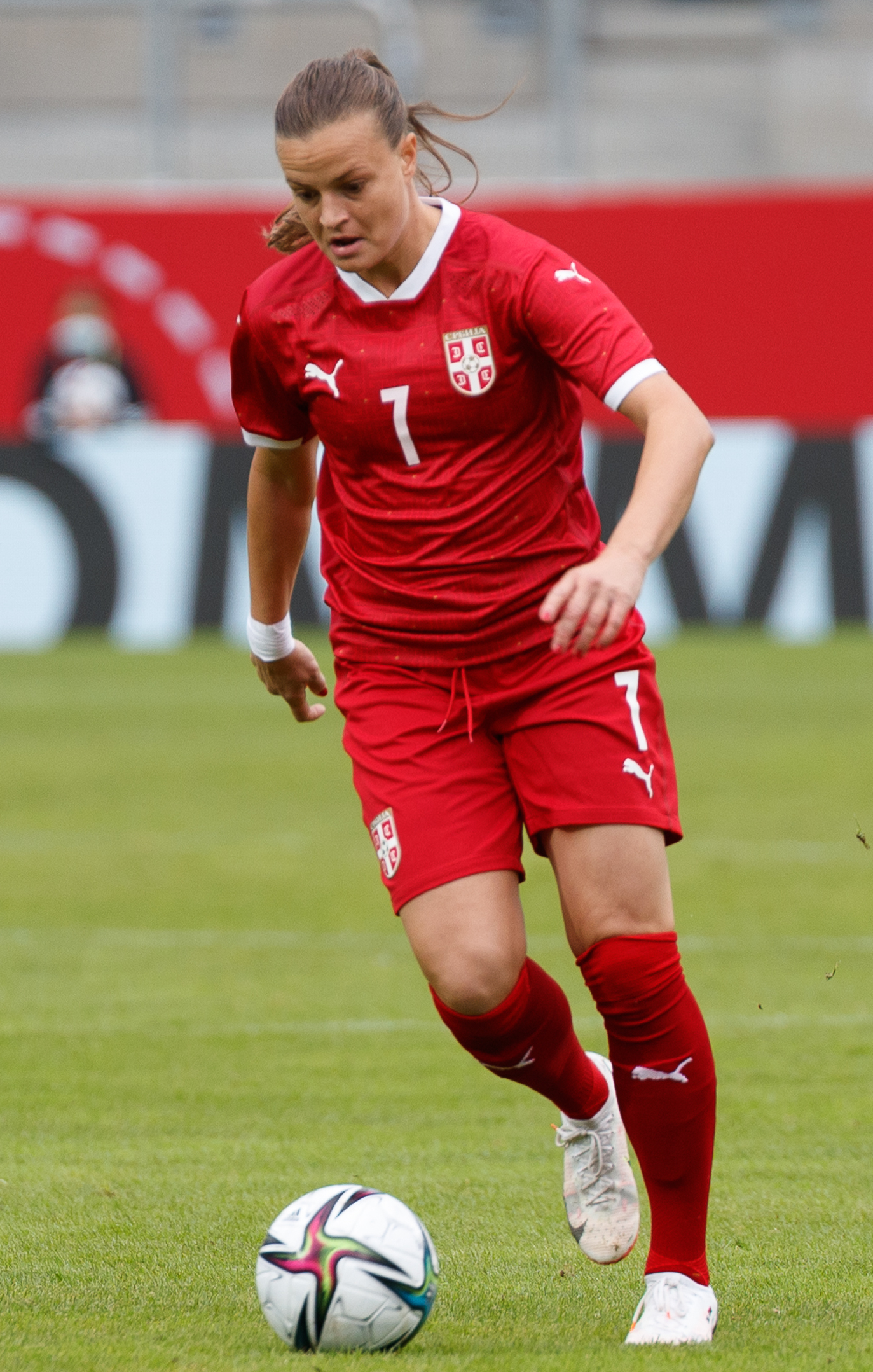
- Mijatović representing Serbia in 2021

Personal information
- Date of birth: 26 June 1991 (age 35)
- Place of birth: Lazarevac, SFR Yugoslavia
- Positions: Midfielder; striker

Team information
- Current team: Ankara BB Fomget
- Number: 20

Senior career*
Years	Team	Apps	(Gls)
–2010	Lazarevac		
2010–2011	Sarajevo		
2011–2012	Red Star Belgrade	30	(19)
2012–2015	BIIK Kazygurt	77	(31)
2015–2016	Red Star Belgrade	29	(21)
2017–2018	ASPTT Albi	32	(2)
2018	Hammarby IF	11	(4)
2019	Arna-Bjørnar	21	(10)
2019–2020	Melbourne City	14	(7)
2020–2021	Apollon Limassol	2	(2)
2021	BK Häcken	20	(3)
2022	Roma	7	(3)
2022–2024	Fiorentina	45	(7)
2024–	Ankara BB Fomget	44	(11)

International career
2009–	Serbia	110	(6)
- * Club domestic league appearances and goals

Milica Mijatović (Serbian Cyrillic: Милица Мијатовић, born 26 June 1991) is a Serbian professional women's football striker who plays in the Turkish Super League for Ankara BB Fomget and the Serbia women's national team. She previously played for Red Star Belgrade in the Serbian 1st League, SFK Sarajevo in the Bosnian Zenska Liga, and Melbourne City in the Australian W-League. In August 2012 she made her debut in the Champions League with BIIK Kazygurt.

== Club career ==
Mijatović signed prior to the 2019–20 W-League season for Melbourne City where she was a vital player scoring 7 goals when the club finished the season unbeaten and as champions.

In September 2020, Mijatović joined Apollon Limassol on a short-term contract to play 2 games in UEFA Champions League.

In September 2024, she moved to Turkey, and signed a deal with Ankara BB Fomget to play in the 2024–25 Super League season. She won the champions title in that season.

== International career ==
Mijatović is a member of the Serbian national team.

== International goals ==
No.	Date	Venue	Opponent	Score	Result	Competition
1.	30 November 2021	Stadion Plovdiv, Plovdiv, Bulgaria	Bulgaria	1–0	4–1	2023 FIFA Women's World Cup qualification
2.	7 April 2023	Serbian FA Sports Center, Stara Pazova, Serbia	Bosnia and Herzegovina	3–0	6–0	Friendly
3.	11 April 2023	Serbian FA Sports Center, Stara Pazova, Serbia	South Africa	2–0	3–2	Friendly
4.	1 December 2023	Theodoros Vardinogiannis Stadium, Heraklion, Greece	Greece	1–0	2–0	2023–24 UEFA Women's Nations League

== Honours ==
Turkish Women's Football Super League

Ankara BB Fomget
Champions (1): 2024–25
