= Caitlin Doeglas =

Australian soccer player

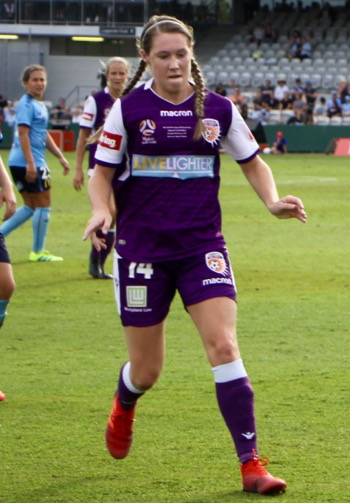
- Doeglas playing for Perth Glory in the 2019 W-League Grand Final

Personal information
- Full name: Caitlin Doeglas
- Date of birth: 1 September 1996 (age 30)
- Place of birth: Australia
- Positions: Midfielder; forward

Senior career*
Years	Team	Apps	(Gls)
2015–2021	Perth Glory	49	(7)
2025	Perth Glory	4	(3)
- * Club domestic league appearances and goals as of 29 January 2025

Caitlin Doeglas (/ˈdʌɡləs/; born 1 September 1996) is an Australian soccer player who played for Perth Glory in the A-League Women.

She made her debut for Perth in the 2015–16 W-League and plays as an attacking midfielder. In the 2016–17 season she scored the second fastest goal in W-league history against Western Sydney Wanderers when she scored in 14 seconds. This was also her first goal in the competition. She was described by her coach, Bobby Despotovski, as a "versatile player who can operate both in midfield and up front".

She also played for Alamein FC in the National Premier Leagues Victoria.

Doeglas departed Perth Glory ahead of the 2021–22 A-League Women season.

In January 2025, Doeglas returned to Perth Glory as an injury replacement, following a long-term injury to Kelli Brown. In her first match back, she scored the club's only goal in a 1–1 draw with Sydney FC.

Doeglas left Perth Glory and returned to teaching full-time in February 2025.
