= Tessa Tamplin =

Australian soccer player (born 2001)

Personal information
- Date of birth: 3 March 2001 (age 25)
- Place of birth: Newcastle, New South Wales, Australia
- Positions: Full-back; winger

Youth career
- 2011–2018: Emerging Jets

Senior career*
Years	Team	Apps	(Gls)
2018–2021	Newcastle Jets	30	(2)
2021–2022	Servette	15	(1)
2022–2023	Newcastle Jets	6	(0)

International career^{‡}
2016–2017	Australia U16	5	(0)
2018–2019	Australia U20	6	(0)
- * Club domestic league appearances and goals as of 31 May 2023 ‡ National team caps and goals as of 23 January 2020

Tessa Tamplin (born 3 March 2001) is an Australian soccer player who last played as a full-back and winger for Newcastle Jets in the A-League Women. She has previously played for Servette in the Swiss Women's Super League.

== Club career ==
=== Newcastle Jets ===
Tamplin began her career as part of Newcastle Jets' academy, before being given her senior debut against Perth Glory after being promoted from a scholarship player. She played four games in her debut season (2018/19), including scoring one goal. Tamplin started all but one game in the subsequent two seasons (2019/20 & 2020/21), playing mostly as a right back. In July 2021, the club announced that following being awarded with the Jets Rising Star award for the season, Tamplin left the club to take up an opportunity overseas.

=== Servette ===
After leaving Newcastle Jets, Tamplin joined Swiss Women's Super League defending champions Servette, signing an initial one-year contract, including an option for an additional season. Since joining she has made regular appearances at both right wing and right back including 4 starts in 7 appearances in the Women's UEFA Champions League, as well as one appearance in the Swiss Cup.

=== Return to Newcastle Jets ===
After one season in Switzerland, Tamplin returned to Australia and signed once more with Newcastle Jets.

At the end of the season, Tamplin was set to join Charlestown Azzurri, but instead spent time out of the game to rehab her leg injury, which had restricted her to 6 appearances for Newcastle Jets.

== International career ==
Tamplin is a dual national holding both Australian and Dutch citizenship. Tamplin was a member of Australia's underage teams including being a member of the 2019 AFC U-19 Women's Championship and the 2016/17 AFC U-16 Women's Championship. She also took part in the Future Matilda Program in 2018 and 2019.
