= Sophie Nenadovic =

Australian soccer player

Personal information
- Full name: Sophie Nenadovic
- Date of birth: 8 April 1998 (age 28)
- Place of birth: New Lambton Heights, Australia
- Height: 1.62 m (5 ft 4 in)
- Position: Defender

Senior career*
Years	Team	Apps	(Gls)
2013–2020	Newcastle Jets	37	(1)
2023–2024	Central Coast Mariners	1	(0)

International career^{‡}
2015–	Australia U20	6	(1)
- * Club domestic league appearances and goals as of 28 March 2024 ‡ National team caps and goals as of 25 October 2017

Sophie Nenadovic (born 8 April 1998) is an Australian football (soccer) player, who last played for Central Coast Mariners in the Australian A-League Women. She has previously played for Newcastle Jets. She was first selected in the Young Matilda's side at the age of 15.

== Career ==
At the age of 15, Nenadovic played her debut game in the W-League for Newcastle Jets in 2013. She was subbed in with 15 minutes remaining against Sydney FC. Later in the 2013–14 W-League season, she scored her first league goal against Perth Glory.

In September 2023, Nenadovic joined Central Coast Mariners. At the end of her contract she left the club in July 2024.
