= Emily van Egmond =

Australian soccer player (born 1993)

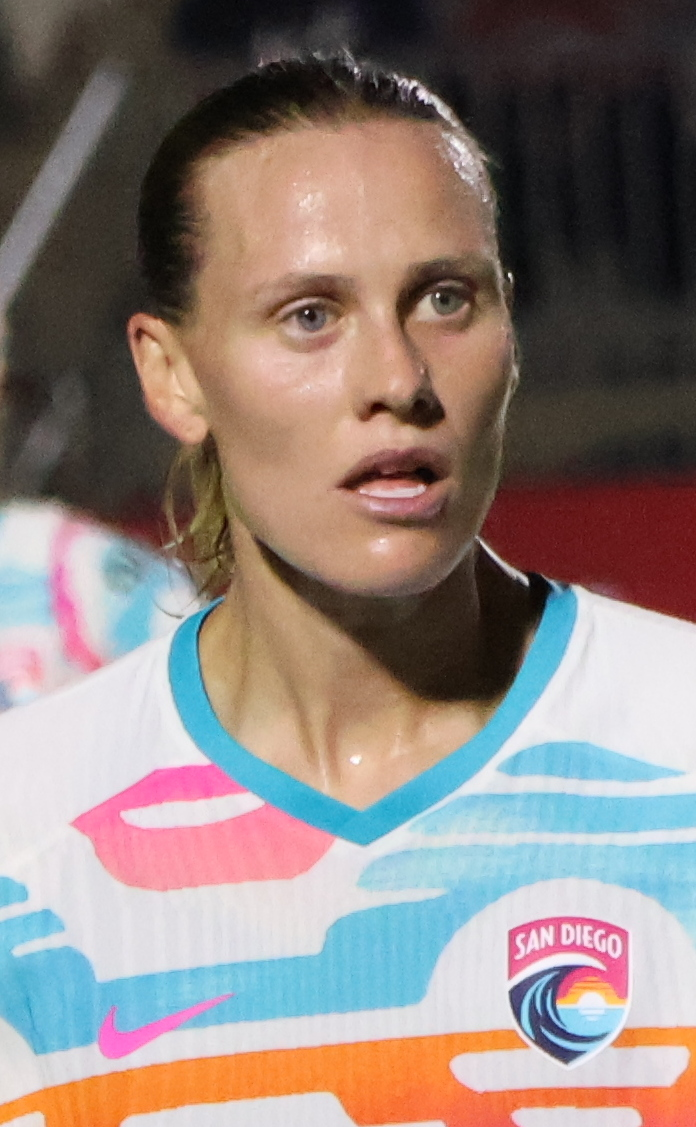
- Van Egmond with the San Diego Wave in 2024

Personal information
- Full name: Emily Louise van Egmond
- Date of birth: 12 July 1993 (age 33)
- Place of birth: Newcastle, New South Wales, Australia
- Height: 1.79 m (5 ft 10 in)
- Positions: Midfielder; forward

Team information
- Current team: Charlton Athletic
- Number: 22

Youth career
- Dudley Redhead United
- 2008: Northern NSW Pride

Senior career*
Years	Team	Apps	(Gls)
2008–2009	Newcastle Jets	8	(2)
2009–2011	Canberra United	16	(2)
2011	Fortuna Hjørring		
2011–2013	Newcastle Jets	17	(5)
2012	Western New York Flash		
2013	Seattle Reign FC	6	(0)
2013–2014	Western Sydney Wanderers	12	(2)
2014	Chicago Red Stars	10	(2)
2014	Newcastle Jets	12	(5)
2015–2016	1. FFC Frankfurt	17	(1)
2016–2017	VfL Wolfsburg	9	(5)
2016	VfL Wolfsburg II	3	(1)
2017–2018	Newcastle Jets	19	(4)
2018–2020	Orlando Pride	25	(0)
2019–2020	→ Melbourne City (loan)	13	(6)
2020	→ West Ham United (loan)	10	(3)
2021	West Ham United	11	(1)
2021	Orlando Pride	2	(0)
2021	Newcastle Jets	3	(0)
2022–2024	San Diego Wave	61	(2)
2023	→ Newcastle Jets (loan)	4	(3)
2025	Birmingham City	8	(2)
2025–2026	Leicester City	15	(1)
2026–	Charlton Athletic	0	(0)

International career^{‡}
2007–2009	Australia U17	15	(4)
2008–2013	Australia U20	6+	(2+)
2010–	Australia	175	(33)
- * Club domestic league appearances and goals as of 18:57, 4 August 2026 (UTC) ‡ National team caps and goals as of 10 October 2026

Emily Louise van Egmond (/ˈɛɡmɒnd/ eg-MOND, Dutch: [vɑn eɣmɔnt]; born 12 July 1993) is an Australian professional soccer player who plays as a midfielder for Women's Super League club Charlton Athletic and the Australia national team.

== Early life ==
Van Egmond was raised in Newcastle, Australia. She began playing football at the age of five, for Dudley Redhead United Football Club. She is the daughter of former Socceroo and Western Sydney Wanderers A-League coach, Gary van Egmond.

== Club career ==
=== Canberra United (2009–2011) ===
Van Egmond played for Canberra United from 2009 through 2011. During the 2009 season, she made six appearances for the club and scored one goal. During the 2010/11 season, she played in seven matches and scored one goal.

=== Fortuna Hjørring (2011–2012) ===
Van Egmond played for Fortuna Hjørring during the 2011–12 UEFA Champions League after being scouted by the team at the 2011 FIFA World Cup. She made one appearance for the club during a match against BSC YB Frauen.

=== Newcastle Jets (2011–2013) ===
Van Egmond returned to the Newcastle Jets for the 2012–2013 season. She scored four goals in the eight matches she started and played in.

=== Western New York Flash (2012) ===
During the summer of 2012, van Egmond played for the Western New York Flash in the Women's Premier Soccer League Elite, the top division women's soccer league at the time. The team clinched the league championship. During the championship final, the Flash defeated the Chicago Red Stars 4–3 on penalties. Van Egmond scored on the fourth penalty for the Flash giving them a 3–2 lead. The Red Stars missed their fourth penalty and the championship title was sealed by Angela Salem's successful fifth penalty.

=== Seattle Reign FC (2013) ===
On 12 July 2013, American side Seattle Reign FC signed van Egmond for the remainder of the inaugural season of the National Women's Soccer League. She made her debut for the club during a match against the Washington Spirit in which the Reign won 2–1. Van Egmond made six appearances for the Reign including four starts, tallying 296 minutes on the pitch.

=== Western Sydney Wanderers (2013–2014) ===
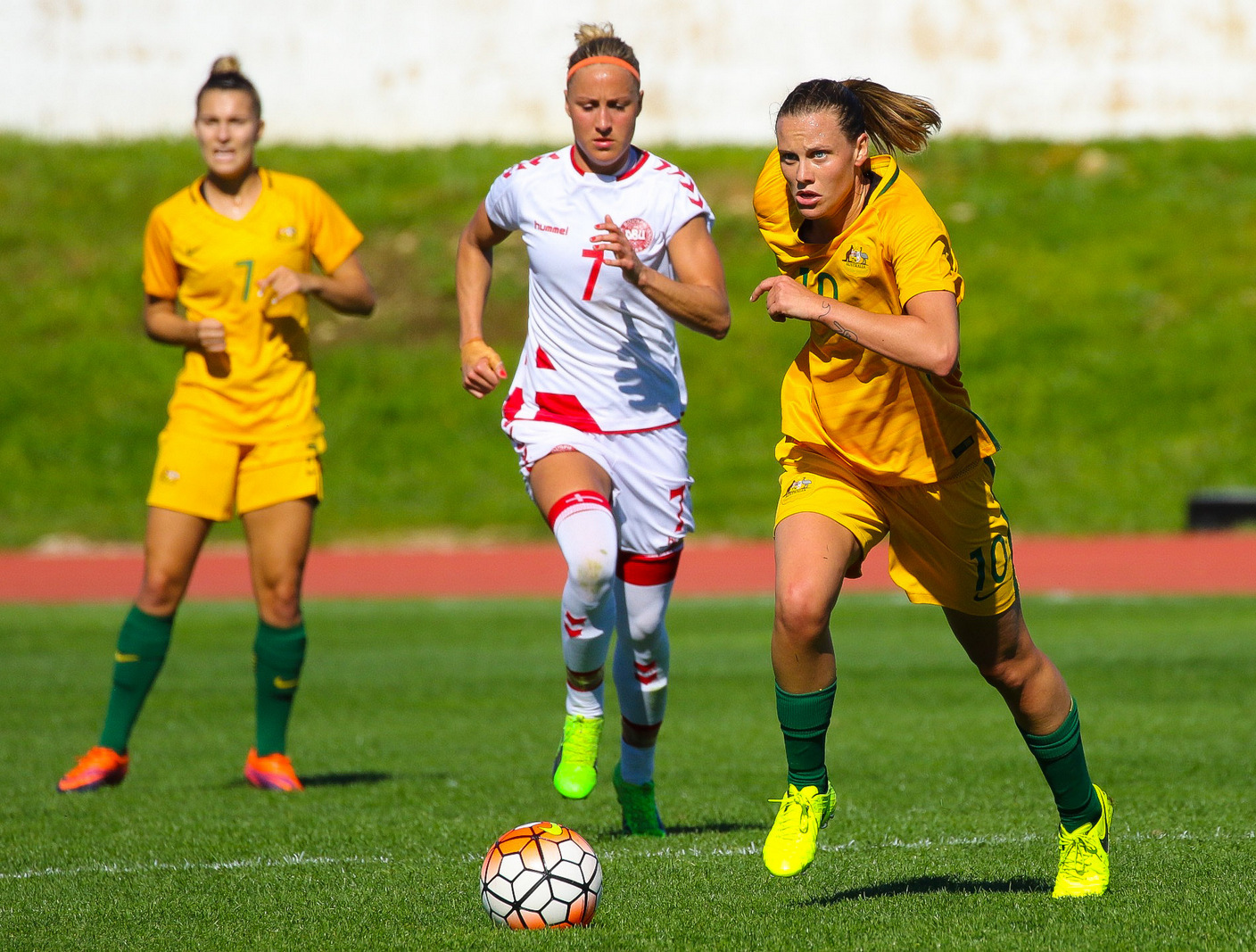
Van Egmond in action for Australia at the 2017 Algarve Cup

Van Egmond signed with Western Sydney Wanderers at the beginning of the 2013–14 season.

=== Chicago Red Stars (2014) ===
In May 2014, van Egmond joined Chicago Red Stars of the NWSL. She was waived by the Chicago Red Stars in September 2014.

=== Newcastle Jets (2014–2015) ===
Ahead of the 2014 season, van Egmond returned again to the Newcastle Jets.

=== 1. FFC Frankfurt (2015–2016) ===
On 12 June 2015, van Egmond joined German Frauen-Bundesliga club 1. FFC Frankfurt.

=== VfL Wolfsburg (2016–2017) ===
On 23 August 2016, van Egmond joined Bundesliga club VfL Wolfsburg on a two-year deal. On 13 October 2017, van Egmond left VfL Wolfsburg to return to Australia.

=== Newcastle Jets (2017) ===
Despite initial reports by VfL Wolfsburg, Newcastle Jets coach Craig Deans confirmed that the club had not signed van Egmond directly from VfL Wolfsburg. A few days later however, Newcastle Jets found the funds to sign her to their W-League squad; hearing that she wanted to return to Australia, businesses as well as the council of her hometown offered financial support to the club, making van Egmond the first paid transfer into the W-League.

=== Orlando Pride (2018–2020) ===
On 14 February 2018, Orlando Pride announced that they had signed van Egmond. Van Egmond made her debut for the Pride on 28 April 2018.

On 15 August 2019, Orlando Pride announced that van Egmond would undergo season-ending ankle surgery in Australia. She was placed on the season ending injury list.

In March 2020, the impending NWSL season was postponed due to the coronavirus pandemic. An eventual restart was made through a smaller schedule 2020 NWSL Challenge Cup tournament. However, on 22 June, Orlando withdrew from the tournament following positive COVID-19 tests among both players and staff.

==== Melbourne City (2019–2020) ====
During the NWSL offseason, van Egmond joined Melbourne City ahead of the 2019–20 W-League season. Van Egmond scored a career-high six regular season goals as Melbourne successfully defended their Premiership title and subsequently went on to win the Championship, beating Sydney FC in the final.

=== West Ham United (2020–2021) ===
On 28 August 2020, having been unable to play since the W-League Championship game in February, Orlando loaned van Egmond to English FA WSL club West Ham United ahead of the 2020–21 season. She scored her first goal for the team on 18 October 2020 in a 4–2 defeat to Manchester United.

In January 2021, van Egmond signed permanently with the club.

In May 2021, van Egmond left West Ham United despite being offered a new contract.

=== Orlando Pride (2021) ===
On 7 October 2021, it was announced van Egmond had re-signed with Orlando Pride for the remainder of the 2021 season. She made two substitute appearances for 58 minutes.

=== Newcastle Jets (2021–2022) ===
With van Egmond's NWSL set to expire on 31 December 2021, Orlando Pride transferred her to Newcastle Jets on 7 December so she could immediately join the team for the 2021–22 A-League Women season during the NWSL offseason while retaining her playing rights. The spell was van Egmond's fifth with her hometown team.

=== San Diego Wave (2022–2024) ===
On 18 January 2022, van Egmond's NWSL playing rights were traded with Taylor Kornieck to San Diego Wave FC in exchange for $125,000 in allocation money and San Diego's natural second-round pick in the 2024 NWSL Draft. Van Egmond made 24 appearances in the 2022 season, scoring one goal in the NWSL playoffs to help the Wave win their quarterfinal fixture against van Egmond former club, the Chicago Red Stars.

She made a further 11 appearances in 2023, where she helped San Diego lift the NWSL Shield after finishing on top of the regular season standings. On 10 January 2024, van Egmond re-signed with the club through the 2025 season.

In 2024, van Egmond made a career-high 26 appearances in the NWSL, all while continuing to play internationally for Australia. She scored her first NWSL regular season goal with San Diego in a 1–0 victory over Seattle Reign FC on 29 March, marking the first time that the Wave triumphed over the Reign in all competitions. Van Egmond's strike was also nominated for the NWSL Goal of the Week.

On 3 January 2025, the Wave and van Egmond mutually agreed to terminate van Egmond's contract, ending her three-year spell with the Californian club.

=== Newcastle Jets (2023) ===
On 17 November 2023, Newcastle Jets announced the signing of van Egmond on a four match guest stint.

=== Birmingham City (2025) ===
Van Egmond signed a two-and-half year deal with English Women's Championship side Birmingham City on 30 January 2025. She made her debut on 2 February 2025 in the side's 1–0 defeat of Sunderland, coming on as a substitute in the 67th minute. Van Egmond made just 8 appearances with Birmingham.

=== Leicester City (2025–2026) ===
On 4 September 2025, Women's Super League club Leicester City announced that they had signed van Egmond on a two year deal, with an optional one year add-on. In the first home game of the 2025–26 season, three minutes after Leicester went a player down against Liverpool after a red card, van Egmond scored the game winner, making it 1–0.

=== Charlton Athletic (2026–) ===
On 4 August 2026, van Egmond joined recently-promoted WSL side Charlton Athletic on a one-year deal.

== International career ==
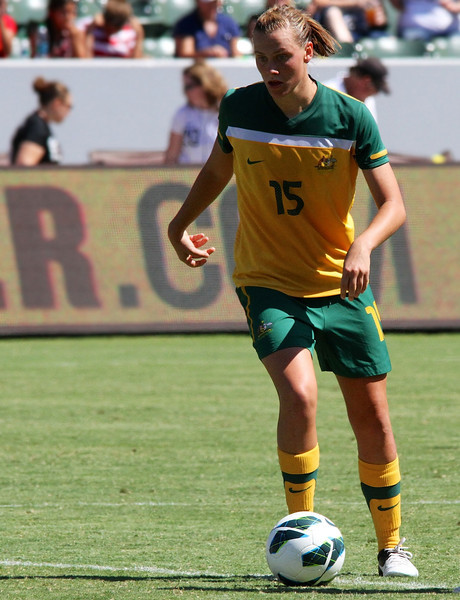
van Egmond playing for Australia

Van Egmond represented the Young Matildas at under-20 level. In January 2010, she was called up to the Australia national team for a two-match series against Italy, but was unable to play in either match due to an ankle injury. She made her senior debut as a late substitute in a match against DPR Korea on March 6, 2010, and she and her team went on to win the 2010 AFC Women's Asian Cup. During the 2011 World Cup in Germany, 17-year-old van Egmond scored to launch Australia to a 2–1 lead over Equatorial Guinea, and helped the squad win 3–2.

Van Egmond was selected for the Matildas which qualified for the Tokyo 2020 Olympics. She played in all five qualification matches. The Matildas advanced to the quarter-finals with one victory and a draw in the group play. In the quarter-finals they beat Great Britain 4-3 after extra time. However, they lost 1–0 to Sweden in the semi-final and were then beaten 4–3 in the bronze medal playoff by USA. Full details. Their fourth place finish was Australia's best-ever finish at a major intercontinental tournament.

On June 10, 2021, she played her 100th match for Australia in a friendly match against Denmark.

In July 2023, she was selection for the World Cup in her home country. Playing regularly as a striker in the absence of captain Sam Kerr, Van Egmond scored her only goal of the tournament against Nigeria.

On 4 June 2024, van Egmond was named in the Matildas team which qualified for the Paris 2024 Olympics, her third Olympic games selection. Van Egmond was part of the Matildas squad which finished as runners-up at the 2026 AFC Women's Asian Cup following a 1–0 loss to Japan in the tournament's final on 21 March 2026, in which she featured for Australia as a substitute. At that tournament she broke Clare Polkinghorne's record of most Matildas caps, finishing with 171.

Called up to the Matildas squad for the 2026 FIFA Series in Kenya, van Egmond scored the first goal in Australia's opening game of the tournament, a 5–0 win over Malawi on 11 April 2026.

== Personal life ==
Born in Australia, van Egmond is of Dutch descent. She began dating San Diego-based photographer Kat Thompson in 2022 after meeting online. The couple announced their engagement in June 2023, and were married at Krinklewood Estate in Broke, New South Wales on 27 December 2024. Thompson became pregnant in April 2025, and the couple's first child, Maddix, was born in October 2025.

== Career statistics ==
=== International goals ===
Scores and results list Australia's goal tally first

#	Date	Venue	Opponent	Score	Result	Competition
1	3 July 2011	Ruhrstadion, Bochum, Germany	Equatorial Guinea	2–1	3–2	2011 FIFA Women's World Cup
2	3 September 2011	Jinan Olympic Sports Center, Jinan, China	Thailand	5–0	5–1	2012 Olympics qualifying
3	8 September 2011	Jinan Olympic Sports Center, Jinan, China	China	1–0	1–0	2012 Olympics qualifying
4	27 November 2013	Parramatta Stadium, Sydney, Australia	China	2–0	2–1	Friendly
5	7 March 2014	GSP Stadium, Nicosia, Cyprus	France	2–3	2–3	2014 Cyprus Cup
6	12 March 2014	Paralimni Stadium, Paralimni, Cyprus	Italy	2–0	5–2	2014 Cyprus Cup
7	12 March 2014	Paralimni Stadium, Paralimni, Cyprus	Italy	3–0	5–2	2014 Cyprus Cup
8	12 February 2015	Bill McKinlay Park, Auckland, New Zealand	New Zealand	1–0	3–2	Friendly
9	9 March 2015	GSZ Stadium, Larnaca, Cyprus	Finland	3–0	3–0	2015 Cyprus Cup
10	11 March 2015	Paralimni Stadium, Paralimni, Cyprus	Czech Republic	2–1	6–2	2015 Cyprus Cup
11	21 May 2015	Jubilee Oval, Sydney, Australia	Vietnam	7–0	11–0	Friendly
12	2 March 2016	Nagai Stadium, Osaka, Japan	Vietnam	7–0	9–0	2016 Olympics qualifying
13	4 March 2016	Nagai Stadium, Osaka, Japan	South Korea	2–0	2–0	2016 Olympics qualifying
14	9 March 2016	Nagai Stadium, Osaka, Japan	China	1–1	1–1	2016 Olympics qualifying
15	30 July 2017	Qualcomm Stadium, San Diego, United States	Japan	4–1	4–2	2017 Tournament of Nations
16	10 April 2018	Amman International Stadium, Amman, Jordan	Vietnam	4–0	8–0	2018 AFC Women's Asian Cup
17	10 November 2018	Penrith Stadium, Sydney, Australia	Chile	1–0	2–3	Friendly
18	10 November 2018	Penrith Stadium, Sydney, Australia	Chile	2–3	2–3	Friendly
19	10 February 2020	Campbelltown Stadium, Sydney, Australia	Thailand	1–0	6–0	2020 Olympics qualifying
20	10 February 2020	Campbelltown Stadium, Sydney, Australia	Thailand	2–0	6–0	2020 Olympics qualifying
21	10 February 2020	Campbelltown Stadium, Sydney, Australia	Thailand	4–0	6–0	2020 Olympics qualifying
22	13 February 2020	Western Sydney Stadium, Sydney, Australia	China	1–1	1–1	2020 Olympics qualifying
23	6 March 2020	Newcastle International Sports Centre, Newcastle, Australia	Vietnam	3–0	5–0	2020 Olympics qualifying
24	23 October 2021	Western Sydney Stadium, Sydney, Australia	Brazil	3–1	3–1	Friendly
25	21 January 2022	Mumbai Football Arena, Mumbai, India	Indonesia	9–0	18–0	2022 AFC Women's Asian Cup
26	21 January 2022	Mumbai Football Arena, Mumbai, India	Indonesia	12–0	18–0	2022 AFC Women's Asian Cup
27	21 January 2022	Mumbai Football Arena, Mumbai, India	Indonesia	15–0	18–0	2022 AFC Women's Asian Cup
28	24 January 2022	Mumbai Football Arena, Mumbai, India	Philippines	3–0	4–0	2022 AFC Women's Asian Cup
29	27 January 2022	Mumbai Football Arena, Mumbai, India	Thailand	1–0	2–1	2022 AFC Women's Asian Cup
30	8 April 2022	North Queensland Stadium, Queensland, Australia	New Zealand	1–1	2–1	Friendly
31	27 July 2023	Lang Park, Brisbane, Australia	Nigeria	1–0	2–3	2023 FIFA Women's World Cup
32	2 June 2025	GIO Stadium, Canberra, Australia	Argentina	3–1	4–1	Friendly
33	11 April 2026	Nyayo National Stadium, Nairobi, Kenya	Malawi	1–0	5–0	2026 FIFA Series

== Honours ==
Western New York Flash

- Women's Premier Soccer League Elite: 2012

Wolfsburg

- Bundesliga: 2016–17
- DFB-Pokal: 2016–17

Melbourne City

- W-League Premiership: 2019–20
- W-League Championship: 2019–20

San Diego Wave

- NWSL Shield: 2023
- NWSL Challenge Cup: 2024

Australia

- FIFA Series: 2026

International

- AFF U-16 Women's Championship: 2009
- AFC Olympic Qualifying Tournament: 2016
- Tournament of Nations: 2017
- FFA Cup of Nations: 2019
- FIFA Series: 2026

Individual

- Julie Dolan Medal: 2014

== See also ==
- List of women's footballers with 100 or more international caps
