= Tara Andrews =

Australian association football player

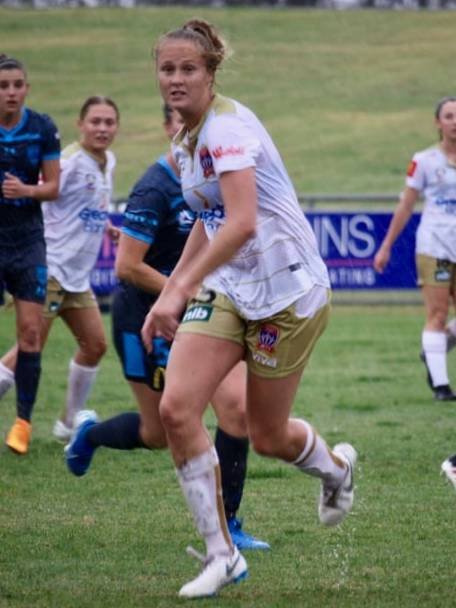

Personal information
- Full name: Tara Jayne Andrews
- Date of birth: 13 March 1994 (age 32)
- Place of birth: Newcastle, Australia
- Height: 1.75 m (5 ft 9 in)
- Position: Striker

Senior career*
Years	Team	Apps	(Gls)
2009–2016	Newcastle Jets	68	(27)
2014–2015	Colorado Pride	23	(24)
2017–2023	Newcastle Jets	61	(19)

International career^{‡}
2015–2023	Australia	2	(0)

Managerial career
- 2025–: Newcastle Jets (women) (Assisant coach)
- * Club domestic league appearances and goals as of 12 June 2023 ‡ National team caps and goals as of 29 November 2015

Tara Jayne Andrews (born 13 March 1994) is a retired Australian association football player, who played for Newcastle Jets in the Australian A-League Women and for Colorado Pride in the US W-league 2nd division.

== Club career ==
=== Newcastle Jets ===
After a season off, Andrews returned to Newcastle Jets for the 2017–18 W-League season.

In March 2023, Andrews announced her retirement.

== Coach career ==
=== Newcastle Jets ===
Tara Andrews has returned to the Newcastle Jets as a second Assistant Coach.
