= Claire Coelho =

Australian soccer player

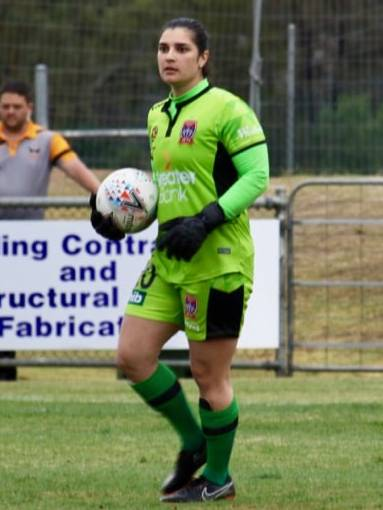

Personal information
- Full name: Claire Coelho
- Date of birth: 16 May 1996 (age 30)
- Place of birth: Port Macquarie, New South Wales, Australia
- Height: 5 ft 5 in (1.65 m)
- Position: Goalkeeper

Senior career*
Years	Team	Apps	(Gls)
2013–2023	Newcastle Jets	47	(0)
2017	→ Sydney FC (loan)	1	(0)

Managerial career
- 2024–: Newcastle Jets FC (Goalkeeper Coach)
- * Club domestic league appearances and goals as of 12 June 2023

Claire Coelho (born 16 May 1996) is a retired Australian soccer player, who was a goalkeeper (2013–2023) for Newcastle Jets in the Australian A-League Women. Since 2024 she has been the Jets' goalkeeper coach.

== Early years ==
Claire Coelho was born on 16 May 1996 in Port Macquarie, New South Wales. She attended St Agnes Primary School and played touch football in 2008. She finished secondary education at MacKillop Senior College in 2014, while representing the Under 18 Women's Country Cricket team as well as signing with Newcastle Jets soccer team at age 18. In 2015, at the local Hastings Awards for 2014, she was joint winner of Junior Sportsperson (18 and under) with Paige Leonhardt.

== Club career ==
=== Newcastle Jets, 2014–2023 ===
Coelho played for the Newcastle Jets from 2014 to 2017. During a match against the Brisbane Roar on 26 October 2014, she made 11 saves (9 in the second half) after replacing the starting goalkeeper due to injury. The Jets finished the 2014–15 W-League season in fifth place with a 5–5–2 record. In September 2015, she re-signed with the team for the 2015–16 W-League season, though she did not play.

During the 2016–17 W-League season, Coehlo made one appearance for the Jets before transferring, on loan, to Sydney FC. In November 2016, after coming on for Kelsey Wys due to injury, Coehlo was named player of the match for her shutout in the 1–0 win over Perth Glory. In July 2017 she returned to the Jets.

In March 2023, Coelho announced her retirement as a player. Her last game for the Jets was in April 2023: a 4–0 away loss to Sydney.

=== Sydney FC, 2017 ===
In February 2017, Coelho joined Sydney FC as an injury replacement for Sham Khamis. After advancing to the play-offs, the team was defeated 5–1 during the semi-finals.

== Coaching ==
Coelho was appointed goalkeeper coach for Newcastle Jets since the 2024–25 season. In June 2026 she was given the same role for the 2026 A-Leagues All Stars Women game against Women's Super League side Chelsea to be held on 12 August at Allianz Stadium, Sydney.
