= 2019–20 Adelaide United FC (women) season =

Adelaide United (women)
2019–20 season
- Chairman: Piet van der Pol
- Head Coach: Ivan Karlović
- Stadium: Marden Sports Complex; Coopers Stadium
- W-League: 6th
- Top goalscorer: Mallory Weber (4)
- Highest home attendance: 832 vs. Newcastle Jets (27 February 2020); W-League
- Lowest home attendance: 565 vs. Perth Glory (3 January 2020); W-League
- Average home league attendance: 689
- Biggest win: 3–2 vs. Western Sydney Wanderers (H) (25 January 2020; W-League; 2–1 vs. Newcastle Jets (H) (27 February 2020); W-League
- Biggest defeat: 0–3 vs. Melbourne Victory (H) (18 January 2020); W-League
Home colours	Away colours

The 2019–20 season was Adelaide United Women's 12th season in the W-League.

== Players ==
As of 11 November 2019

Note: Flags indicate national team as defined under FIFA eligibility rules; some limited exceptions apply. Players may hold more than one non-FIFA nationality.

No.	Pos.	Nation	Player
1	GK	AUS	Sarah Willacy
2	DF	AUS	Emily Hodgson
3	DF	AUS	Kahlia Hogg (vice-captain)
4	FW	USA	Mallory Weber (on loan from Utah Royals)
5	DF	AUS	Charlotte Grant
6	DF	AUS	Georgia Campagnale
7	MF	AUS	Ciara Fowler
8	MF	AUS	Emily Condon
9	FW	AUS	Mary Fowler

No.	Pos.	Nation	Player
10	MF	AUS	Chelsie Dawber
11	DF	AUS	Laura Johns (vice-captain)
12	FW	AUS	Isabel Hodgson
14	DF	USA	Julia Ashley
16	MF	AUS	Dylan Holmes
17	DF	AUS	Matilda McNamara
18	MF	BRA	Lais Araujo
20	GK	AUS	Evelyn Goldsmith
22	DF	USA	Amber Brooks (captain) (on loan from Houston Dash)

== Transfers ==
=== Transfers in ===
No.	Position	Player	Transferred from	Type/fee	Contract length	Date	Ref
7	MF	Ciara Fowler	(Australia) Bankstown City	Free	1 year	27 September 2019	
9	FW	Mary Fowler	(Australia) Bankstown City	Free	1 year	27 September 2019	

=== Loans in ===
No.	Position	Player	Transferred from	Contract length	Date	Ref
4	FW	(United States) Mallory Weber	(United States) Utah Royals	1 year	30 October 2019	

=== Transfers out ===
No.	Position	Player	Transferred to	Type/fee	Date	Ref
15	DF	Emma Checker	Melbourne City	Free	19 September 2019	

=== Loans out ===
No.	Position	Player	Transferred to	Date	Ref
9	MF	(Iceland) Fanndís Friðriksdóttir	(Iceland) Valur	14 October 2019	
5	MF	(Iceland) Gunnhildur Yrsa Jónsdóttir	(United States) Utah Royals	14 October 2019	

== Competitions ==
=== Overview ===
Competition	First match	Last match	Starting round	Final position	Record							
Competition	First match	Last match	Starting round	Final position	Pld	W	D	L	GF	GA	GD	Win %
W-League	14 November 2019	27 February 2020	Matchday 1	8th	12	2	1	9	12	24	−12	16.67
Total					12	2	1	9	12	24	−12	16.67

Source: Soccerway

=== W-League ===
==== League table ====
Pos	Team	Pld	W	D	L	GF	GA	GD	Pts	Qualification
1	Melbourne City (C)	12	11	1	0	27	4	+23	34	Qualification to Finals series
2	Melbourne Victory	12	7	2	3	24	14	+10	23	Qualification to Finals series
3	Sydney FC	12	7	1	4	21	13	+8	22	Qualification to Finals series
4	Western Sydney Wanderers	12	7	1	4	24	20	+4	22	Qualification to Finals series
5	Brisbane Roar	12	5	2	5	22	19	+3	17	
6	Canberra United	12	4	1	7	13	29	−16	13	
7	Perth Glory	12	3	2	7	19	24	−5	11	
8	Adelaide United	12	2	1	9	12	24	−12	7	
9	Newcastle Jets	12	2	1	9	12	27	−15	7	

Source: A-Leagues
Rules for classification: 1) points; 2) goal difference; 3) number of goals scored.
(C) Champions

==== Results summary ====
Overall								Home						Away					
Pld	W	D	L	GF	GA	GD	Pts	W	D	L	GF	GA	GD	W	D	L	GF	GA	GD
12	2	1	9	12	24	−12	7	2	1	3	8	11	−3	0	0	6	4	13	−9

Source: worldfootball.net

==== Matches ====
Win Draw Loss

14 November 2019 1	Western Sydney Wanderers	2–1	Adelaide United	Sydney
19:30 AEDT	Hamilton 44'; Cooney-Cross 90+2'	Report	M. Fowler 39' (pen.)	Stadium: Marconi Stadium; Attendance: 787; Referee: Rebecca Durcau

22 November 2019 2	Adelaide United	0–1	Sydney FC	Adelaide
19:00 ACDT		Report	Foord 56'	Stadium: Marden Sports Complex; Attendance: 784; Referee: Isabella Blaess

30 November 2019 3	Melbourne City	1–0	Adelaide United	Shepparton
19:00 AEDT	Simon 8'	Report		Stadium: John McEwan Reserve; Attendance: 500; Referee: Georgia Ghirardello

14 December 2019 5	Brisbane Roar	3–2	Adelaide United	Brisbane
16:30 AEST	Riley 4'; Raso 12', 83'	Report	M. Fowler 25'; Weber 76'	Stadium: Lions Stadium; Attendance: 1,682; Referee: Lara Lee

22 December 2019 6	Adelaide United	1–2	Canberra United	Adelaide
15:30 ACDT	Condon 90+3'	Report	L. Khamis 9'; Taylor-Young 78'	Stadium: Marden Sports Complex; Attendance: 693; Referee: Isabella Blaess

29 December 2019 7	Sydney FC	2–0	Adelaide United	Sydney
16:00 AEDT	Brooks 77' (o.g.); Ibini 90'	Report		Stadium: Jubilee Oval; Attendance: 3,373; Referee: Kelly Jones

3 January 2020 8	Adelaide United	2–2	Perth Glory	Adelaide
19:00 ACDT	Dawber 38'; M. Fowler 45'	Report	Thomas 52'; Andrews 90+3' (pen.)	Stadium: Marden Sports Complex; Attendance: 565; Referee: Kate Jacewicz

18 January 2020 10	Adelaide United	0–3	Melbourne Victory	Adelaide
19:00 ACDT		Report	Dowie 17', 81'; Sutton 78'	Stadium: Marden Sports Complex; Referee: Rachel Mitchenson

25 January 2020 11	Adelaide United	3–2	Western Sydney Wanderers	Adelaide
19:00 ACDT	Dawber 17'; Weber 39', 45+1'	Report	Staab 88'; Araujo 90+3' (o.g.)	Stadium: Marden Sports Complex; Attendance: 569; Referee: Isabella Blaess

1 February 2020 9	Newcastle Jets	2–0	Adelaide United	Newcastle
17:00 AEDT	Andrews 52' (pen.); Pountney 78'	Report		Stadium: McDonald Jones Stadium; Attendance: 513; Referee: Lara Lee

16 February 2020 12	Canberra United	3–1	Adelaide United	Canberra
16:00 AEDT	Hughes 34'; L. Khamis 68'; Charley 80'	Report	I. Hodgson 45'	Stadium: McKellar Park; Attendance: 1,202; Referee: Georgia Ghirardello

27 February 2020 14	Adelaide United	2–1	Newcastle Jets	Adelaide
19:00 ACST	Brooks 24'; Weber 61'	Report	Collister 37'	Stadium: Marden Sports Complex; Attendance: 832; Referee: Rebecca Mackie

== Statistics ==
=== Appearances and goals ===
Includes all competitions. Players with no appearances not included in the list.

No.	Pos	Nat	Player	Total		W-League	
No.	Pos	Nat	Player	Apps	Goals	Apps	Goals
1	GK	(Australia) AUS	Eliza Campbell	3	0	3	0
2	DF	(Australia) AUS	Emily Hodgson	6	0	5+1	0
3	FW	(United States) USA	Makenzy Doniak	12	7	12	7
4	MF	(United States) USA	Alyssa Mautz	12	2	12	2
5	DF	(Australia) AUS	Jenna McCormick	12	1	12	1
6	MF	(Australia) AUS	Georgia Campagnale	12	0	12	0
8	MF	(Australia) AUS	Emily Condon	12	1	9+3	1
9	FW	(Australia) AUS	Adriana Konjarski	9	0	6+3	0
10	MF	(Australia) AUS	Alex Chidiac	11	1	11	1
11	DF	(Australia) AUS	Laura Johns	9	0	3+6	0
12	FW	(Australia) AUS	Chelsie Dawber	9	0	1+8	0
13	MF	(Australia) AUS	Nora Peat	5	0	1+4	0
14	MF	(Australia) AUS	Grace Abbey	3	0	1+2	0
15	DF	(Australia) AUS	Emma Checker	12	0	12	0
16	MF	(Australia) AUS	Katelyn Tucker	2	0	0+2	0
20	GK	(Australia) AUS	Sarah Langman	9	0	9	0
24	MF	(United States) USA	Danielle Colaprico	11	1	11	1
25	DF	(United States) USA	Katie Lind	12	2	12	2

- Source: Soccerway

=== Disciplinary record ===
Includes all competitions. The list is sorted by squad number when total cards are equal. Players with no cards not included in the list.

No.	Pos	Nat	Player	Total			W-League		
No.	Pos	Nat	Player	Yellow card	Second yellow card	Red card	Yellow card	Second yellow card	Red card
4	MF	(United States) USA	Alyssa Mautz	2	0	0	2	0	0
5	DF	(Australia) AUS	Jenna McCormick	2	0	0	2	0	0
3	FW	(United States) USA	Makenzy Doniak	1	0	0	1	0	0
6	MF	(Australia) AUS	Georgia Campagnale	1	0	0	1	0	0
9	FW	(Australia) AUS	Adriana Konjarski	1	0	0	1	0	0
15	DF	(Australia) AUS	Emma Checker	1	0	0	1	0	0

- Source: Soccerway
- (yellow card) = Number of bookings; (second yellow card) = Number of sending offs after a second yellow card; (red card) = Number of sending offs by a direct red card.
