= 2020–21 Adelaide United FC (women) season =

13th season in existence of Adelaide United (women)

Adelaide United (women)
2020–21 season
- Chairman: Piet van der Pol
- Head Coach: Adrian Stenta
- Stadium: Marden Sports Complex
- W-League: 5th
- W-League Finals: DNQ
- Top goalscorer: Chelsie Dawber (5)
- Highest home attendance: 5,159 vs. Western Sydney Wanderers (21 March 2021); W-League
- Lowest home attendance: 912 vs. Melbourne City (21 January 2021); W-League
- Average home league attendance: 1,701
- Biggest win: 2–0 vs. Sydney FC (H) (6 March 2021); W-League; 3–1 vs. Western Sydney Wanderers (H) (21 March 2021); W-League
- Biggest defeat: 2–4 vs. Brisbane Roar (A) (12 March 2021); W-League
Home colours	Away colours

The 2020–21 season was Adelaide United Football Club (women)'s 13th season in the W-League. Adelaide United finished 5th in their W-League season.

== Players ==
Note: Flags indicate national team as defined under FIFA eligibility rules; some limited exceptions apply. Players may hold more than one non-FIFA nationality.

No.	Pos.	Nation	Player
1	GK	AUS	Sian Fryer-McLaren
2	DF	AUS	Emily Hodgson
3	DF	AUS	Matilda McNamara
4	DF	USA	Mallory Weber
5	DF	AUS	Charli Grant
6	MF	AUS	Georgia Campagnale
7	FW	CHI	María José Rojas
8	MF	AUS	Emily Condon
10	FW	AUS	Chelsie Dawber
11	DF	AUS	Laura Johns

No.	Pos.	Nation	Player
12	DF	AUS	Isabel Hodgson
13	DF	AUS	Ella Tonkin
15	FW	AUS	Meleri Mullan
16	MF	AUS	Dylan Holmes
17	DF	AUS	Kahlia Hogg
18	GK	AUS	Annalee Grove
19	DF	NED	Maruschka Waldus
21	MF	AUS	Lara Kirkby
22	GK	AUS	Inana Toovey
23	FW	ENG	Fiona Worts

== Transfers and contracts ==
=== Transfers in ===
No.	Position	Player	Transferred from	Type/fee	Date	Ref.
1	GK	Sian Fryer-McLaren	(Australia) Salisbury Inter	Free transfer	14 October 2020	
18	GK	Annalee Grove	Canberra United	Free transfer	22 October 2020	
15	FW	Meleri Mullan	(Australia) Salisbury Inter	Free transfer	21 December 2020	
7	FW	(Chile) María José Rojas	(Australia) Salisbury Inter	Free transfer	24 December 2020	
21	MF	Lara Kirkby	(Australia) West Adelaide	Free transfer	29 December 2020	
23	FW	(England) Fiona Worts	(England) Coventry United	Free transfer	29 December 2020	
—	MF	Abbey Burns	(Australia) FFSA NTC	Free transfer	29 December 2020	
19	DF	(Netherlands) Maruschka Waldus	Unattached	Free transfer	8 January 2021	

=== Transfers out ===
No.	Position	Player	Transferred to	Type/fee	Date	Ref.
14	DF	(United States) Julia Ashley	(United States) OL Reign	Free transfer	4 March 2020	
22	DF	(United States) Amber Brooks	(United States) OL Reign	Free transfer	4 March 2020	
15	MF	Victoria Mansueto	(Australia) Metro United	Free transfer	6 March 2020	
18	DF	(Brazil) Laís Araújo	(Cyprus) Apollon Limassol	Free transfer	3 September 2020	
1	GK	Sarah Willacy	Western Sydney Wanderers	Free transfer	29 September 2020	
7	MF	Ciara Fowler	Unattached	Free transfer	30 December 2020	
20	GK	Evelyn Goldsmith	Unattached	Free transfer	30 December 2020	
16	MF	Dylan Holmes	(Sweden) Häcken	Free transfer	3 March 2021	

=== Contract extensions ===
No.	Position	Player	Duration	Date	Ref.
5	DF	Charli Grant	1 year	20 September 2020	
8	MF	Emily Condon	1 year	21 September 2020	
12	DF	Isabel Hodgson	1 year	21 September 2020	
16	MF	Dylan Holmes	1 year	21 September 2020	
3	DF	Matilda McNamara	1 year	23 September 2020	
10	FW	Chelsie Dawber	1 year	23 September 2020	
2	DF	Emily Hodgson	1 year	25 September 2020	
11	DF	Laura Johns	1 year	25 September 2020	
6	MF	Georgia Campagnale	1 year	28 September 2020	
4	DF	(United States) Mallory Weber	1 year	20 December 2020	
13	DF	Ella Tonkin	1 year	27 December 2020	
17	DF	Kahlia Hogg	1 year	29 December 2020	
21	MF	Inana Toovey	1 year	29 December 2020	

== Competitions ==
=== Overall record ===
Competition	First match	Last match	Starting round	Final position	Record							
Competition	First match	Last match	Starting round	Final position	Pld	W	D	L	GF	GA	GD	Win %
W-League	30 December 2020	21 March 2021	Matchday 1	5th	12	7	1	4	22	18	+4	58.33
Total					12	7	1	4	22	18	+4	58.33

Source: Competitions

=== W-League ===
==== League table ====
Pos	Team	Pld	W	D	L	GF	GA	GD	Pts	Qualification
1	Sydney FC	12	9	1	2	26	11	+15	28	Qualification to Finals series
2	Brisbane Roar	12	7	4	1	29	12	+17	25	Qualification to Finals series
3	Melbourne Victory (C)	12	7	2	3	25	14	+11	23	Qualification to Finals series
4	Canberra United	12	6	4	2	21	16	+5	22	Qualification to Finals series
5	Adelaide United	12	7	1	4	22	18	+4	22	
6	Western Sydney Wanderers	12	4	1	7	13	21	−8	13	
7	Melbourne City	12	4	1	7	11	23	−12	13	
8	Newcastle Jets	12	2	1	9	14	21	−7	7	
9	Perth Glory	12	0	1	11	7	32	−25	1	

Source: A-Leagues
Rules for classification: 1) points; 2) goal difference; 3) number of goals scored.
(C) Champions

==== Results summary ====
Overall								Home						Away					
Pld	W	D	L	GF	GA	GD	Pts	W	D	L	GF	GA	GD	W	D	L	GF	GA	GD
12	7	1	4	22	18	+4	22	5	0	1	10	4	+6	2	1	3	12	14	−2

Source: worldfootball.net

==== Results by round ====
Round	6	3	11	14	3	8	8	12	2	5	8	9
Ground	A	H	A	H	H	A	H	A	A	H	A	H
Result	L	W	W	W	L	D	W	L	W	W	L	W
Position	8	3	3	2	2	4	3	4	3	3	3	3^{1}
Points	0	3	6	9	9	10	13	13	16	19	19	22

Source: A-Leagues
A = Away; H = Home; W = Win; D = Draw; L = Loss
Notes:
^{1} Adelaide United finished their last round at 3rd place, but the league season finished with Adelaide United in 5th place.

==== Matches ====
The league fixtures were announced on 30 November 2020.

Win Draw Loss

30 December 2020 6	Canberra United	4–3	Adelaide United	Canberra
16:00 AEDT	Heyman 48', 75', 90+3'; Hughes 90+1'	Report	Rojas 21'; I. Hodgson 28'; Weber 90+4'	Stadium: McKellar Park; Attendance: 1,167; Referee: Kate Jacewicz
Note: Match originally scheduled for 31 January, but rescheduled due to latest government guidance in New South Wales. It was rescheduled for 30 December.

9 January 2021 3	Adelaide United	1–0	Perth Glory	Adelaide
18:35 ACDT	Condon 80' (pen.)	Report		Stadium: Marden Sports Complex; Attendance: 1,074; Referee: Georgia Ghirardello
Note: Match not originally set in fixture draw, but added due to other fixture arrangements.

14 January 2021 11	Perth Glory	1–2	Adelaide United	Perth
17:05 AWST	Doeglas 53'	Report	Worts 6'; Condon 74'	Stadium: Dorrien Gardens; Attendance: 673; Referee: Georgia Ghirardello
Note: Match originally scheduled for 6 March at 18:00 AWST, but rescheduled for 14 January at 17:05 AWST.

21 January 2021 14	Adelaide United	2–1	Melbourne City	Adelaide
19:00 ACDT	Holmes 31', 53'	Report	Checker 90+3'	Stadium: Marden Sports Complex; Attendance: 912; Referee: Isabella Blaess
Note: Match originally scheduled for 26 March, but rescheduled for 21 January at 19:00 ACDT.

29 January 2021 3	Adelaide United	0–1	Melbourne Victory	Adelaide
18:35 ACDT		Report	Zimmerman 78'	Stadium: Marden Sports Complex; Attendance: 1,105; Referee: Rebecca Durcau
Note: Match originally scheduled for 9 January at 16:30 ACDT, but postponed due to other fixture arrangements. It was rescheduled for 29 January at 18:35 ACDT.

7 February 2021 8	Western Sydney Wanderers	2–2	Adelaide United	Sydney
16:05 AEDT	Hunter 43', 78'	Report	Dawber 33'; Holmes 71'	Stadium: Marconi Stadium; Attendance: 415; Referee: Rebecca Durcau
Note: Match not originally set in fixture draw, but added due to other fixture arrangements.

14 February 2021 8	Adelaide United	2–1	Canberra United	Adelaide
17:35 ACDT	Dawber 11'; Condon 55'	Report	Satchell 46'	Stadium: Marden Sports Complex; Attendance: 969; Referee: Isabella Blaess
Note: Match not originally set in fixture draw, but added due to other fixture arrangements. Match originally scheduled for 12 February, but rescheduled for 14 February.

21 February 2021 12	Sydney FC	2–1	Adelaide United	Sydney
16:05 AEDT	Siemsen 40'; Vine 48'	Report	McNamara 64'	Stadium: Cromer Park; Attendance: 1,087; Referee: Rebecca Durcau
Note: Match originally scheduled for 14 March at 16:00 AEDT at WIN Stadium, but rescheduled for 21 February at 16:05 AEDT at Cromer Park.

26 February 2021 2	Newcastle Jets	1–2	Adelaide United	Newcastle
18:05 AEDT	Simon 13'	Report	Dawber 12'; Condon 12', 15'	Stadium: No.2 Sportsground; Attendance: 652; Referee: Lara Lee
Note: Match originally scheduled for 1 January at 17:00 AEDT, but postponed due to other fixture arrangements. It was rescheduled for 26 February at 18:05 AEDT.

6 March 2021 5	Adelaide United	2–0	Sydney FC	Adelaide
18:35 ACDT	Waldus 5'; Weber 19'	Report		Stadium: Marden Sports Complex; Attendance: 987; Referee: Casey Reibelt
Note: Match originally scheduled for 21 January at 18:30 ACDT, but postponed due to other fixture arrangements. It was rescheduled for 6 March at 18:35 ACDT.

12 March 2021 8	Brisbane Roar	4–2	Adelaide United	Brisbane
20:05 AEST	Hecher 22'; Gielnik 62', 72', 80'	Report	Dawber 34', 87'	Stadium: Lions Stadium; Attendance: 1,791; Referee: Isabella Blaess
Note: Match originally scheduled for 12 February at 20:00 AEST, but postponed due to other fixture arrangements. It was rescheduled for 12 March at 20:05 AEST.

21 March 2021 9	Adelaide United	3–1	Western Sydney Wanderers	Adelaide
15:35 ACDT	I. Hodgson 18'; Waldus 50'; Worts 63'	Report	Price 4'	Stadium: Marden Sports Complex; Attendance: 5,159; Referee: Lara Lee
Note: Match originally scheduled for 20 February at 18:30 ACDT at Marden Sports Complex, but rescheduled due to other fixture arrangements. It was rescheduled for 21 March at 15:35 ACDT at Coopers Stadium.
