= W-League transfers for 2020–21 season =

This is a list of Australian soccer transfers for the 2020–21 W-League. Only moves featuring at least one W-League club are listed.

== Transfers ==
All players without a flag are Australian. Clubs without a flag are clubs participating in the W-League.

=== Pre-season ===
Date	Name	Moving from	Moving to
1 January 2020	(Norway) Elise Thorsnes	Canberra United	(Norway) Avaldsnes
1 January 2020	Amy Sayer	Sydney FC	(United States) Stanford Cardinal
28 January 2020	Katrina Gorry	Brisbane Roar	(Norway) Avaldsnes
29 January 2020	Nikola Orgill	Canberra United	(Norway) Kolbotn
1 February 2020	(Japan) Yukari Kinga	Melbourne City	(Japan) Orca Kamogawa
13 February 2020	(United States) Lauren Barnes	Melbourne City	(United States) OL Reign (end of loan)
20 February 2020	Sophie Nenadovic	Newcastle Jets	(Australia) Manly United
28 February 2020	(United States) Kaleigh Kurtz	Canberra United	(United States) North Carolina Courage (end of loan)
March 2020	(United States) Shea Connors	Brisbane Roar	(Australia) Logan Lightning
2 March 2020	Trudy Burke	Sydney FC	(Australia) North Shore Mariners
4 March 2020	(United States) Julia Ashley	Adelaide United	(United States) OL Reign
4 March 2020	(United States) Amber Brooks	Adelaide United	(United States) OL Reign
4 March 2020	(United States) Sofia Huerta	Sydney FC	(United States) OL Reign
5 March 2020	(United States) Morgan Andrews	Perth Glory	(United States) OL Reign (end of loan)
6 March 2020	Victoria Mansueto	Adelaide United	(Australia) Metro United
9 March 2020	(United States) Crystal Thomas	Perth Glory	(United States) Washington Spirit (end of loan)
9 March 2020	(United States) Aubrey Bledsoe	Sydney FC	(United States) Washington Spirit (end of loan)
9 March 2020	(United States) Sam Staab	Western Sydney Wanderers	(United States) Washington Spirit (end of loan)
19 March 2020	Rebekah Horsey	Canberra United	(Australia) Mitchelton FC
19 March 2020	Sham Khamis	Canberra United	(Australia) Macarthur Rams
20 March 2020	Elise Kellond-Knight	Brisbane Roar	(Sweden) Kristianstads
23 March 2020	(United States) Ally Watt	Melbourne City	(United States) North Carolina Courage (end of loan)
23 March 2020	(United States) Carson Pickett	Brisbane Roar	(United States) Orlando Pride (end of loan)
23 March 2020	(Brazil) Camila	Canberra United	(United States) Orlando Pride (end of loan)
23 March 2020	Emily van Egmond	Melbourne City	(United States) Orlando Pride (end of loan)
23 March 2020	(Scotland) Claire Emslie	Melbourne City	(United States) Orlando Pride (end of loan)
23 March 2020	Alanna Kennedy	Sydney FC	(United States) Orlando Pride (end of loan)
24 March 2020	Ellie Carpenter	Melbourne City	(United States) Portland Thorns (end of loan)
4 April 2020	(United States) Simone Charley	Canberra United	(United States) Portland Thorns (end of loan)
8 April 2020	(United States) Emily Menges	Melbourne Victory	(United States) Portland Thorns (end of loan)
11 April 2020	(United States) Veronica Latsko	Sydney FC	(United States) Houston Dash (end of loan)
14 April 2020	Amy Harrison	Western Sydney Wanderers	(Netherlands) PSV
15 April 2020	(United States) Haley Hanson	Melbourne Victory	(United States) Houston Dash (end of loan)
14 May 2020	Claire Farrington	Brisbane Roar	(United States) Butler Bulldogs
31 May 2020	Teagan Micah	Melbourne Victory	(Norway) Arna-Bjørnar
19 June 2020	(United States) Darian Jenkins	Melbourne Victory	(United States) OL Reign (end of loan)
19 June 2020	(Canada) Lindsay Agnew	Sydney FC	(United States) North Carolina Courage
21 June 2020	Renee Pountney	Newcastle Jets	(United States) Creighton Bluejays
30 June 2020	Ella Mastrantonio	Western Sydney Wanderers	(England) Bristol City
1 July 2020	(United States) Katie Stengel	Canberra United	(United States) Houston Dash (Note: Stengel was originally loaned to Canberra United by Utah Royals, but was traded to Houston Dash during the 2019–20 season.)
2 July 2020	Steph Catley	Melbourne City	(England) Arsenal
4 July 2020	Kyah Simon	Melbourne City	(Netherlands) PSV
6 July 2020	(Spain) Celia	Perth Glory	(United States) OL Reign (end of loan)
8 July 2020	Lydia Williams	Melbourne City	(England) Arsenal
9 July 2020	Mackenzie Arnold	Brisbane Roar	(England) West Ham United
14 July 2020	(United States) Abby Smith	Western Sydney Wanderers	(United States) Utah Royals (end of loan)
17 July 2020	(England) Natasha Dowie	Melbourne Victory	(Italy) Milan
20 July 2020	Laura Brock	Melbourne Victory	(France) Guingamp
22 July 2020	Jenna McCormick	Melbourne Victory	(Spain) Real Betis
25 July 2020	Ayesha Norrie	Perth Glory	(Australia) Gold Coast United
26 July 2020	Shadeene Evans	Sydney FC	(Australia) Sydney Olympic
28 July 2020	Paige Kingston-Hogg	Newcastle Jets	Unattached
29 July 2020	(United States) Kristen Hamilton	Western Sydney Wanderers	(United States) North Carolina Courage (end of loan)
30 July 2020	Aivi Luik	Melbourne City	(Spain) Sevilla
3 August 2020	Indiah-Paige Riley	Brisbane Roar	(Denmark) Fortuna Hjørring
8 August 2020	Emma Robers	Melbourne Victory	Unattached
13 August 2020	Rachel Lowe	Western Sydney Wanderers	Sydney FC
13 August 2020	Cortnee Vine	Western Sydney Wanderers	Sydney FC
13 August 2020	Jada Whyman	Western Sydney Wanderers	Sydney FC
13 August 2020	Clare Wheeler	Newcastle Jets	Sydney FC
13 August 2020	Charlotte McLean	Unattached	Sydney FC
13 August 2020	Charlize Rule	Unattached	Sydney FC
15 August 2020	Emma Stanbury	Canberra United	(Australia) Tuggeranong United
16 August 2020	Liana Cook	Perth Glory	(Australia) Perth SC
16 August 2020	Jenna Onions	Perth Glory	(Australia) Perth SC
21 August 2020	(United States) Celeste Boureille	Brisbane Roar (Note: Boureille returned from loan to her parent club Portland Thorns before being loaned to Fleury.)	(France) Fleury
28 August 2020	(New Zealand) Rebekah Stott	Melbourne City	(England) Brighton & Hove Albion
3 September 2020	Olivia Price	Canberra United	Western Sydney Wanderers
3 September 2020	(Brazil) Lais Araujo	Adelaide United	(Cyprus) Apollon Limassol
3 September 2020	(United States) Rylee Baisden	Brisbane Roar	(United States) North Carolina Courage
4 September 2020	Georgia Yeoman-Dale	Unattached	Western Sydney Wanderers
4 September 2020	Katherine Goff	Melbourne City	(Australia) Gold Coast United
9 September 2020	(Mexico) Arianna Romero	Perth Glory	(United States) North Carolina Courage (Note: Romero was originally loaned to Perth Glory by Houston Dash, but they waived her on 17 June 2020.)
10 September 2020	Grace Maher	Melbourne Victory	Canberra United
28 September 2020	Annabel Martin	Newcastle Jets	(Australia) Sydney University
29 September 2020	(Serbia) Milica Mijatović	Melbourne City	(Cyprus) Apollon Limassol
29 September 2020 (Note: Player was released to free agency before joining new club)	Sarah Willacy	Adelaide United	Western Sydney Wanderers
2 October 2020	Alexandra Huynh	Western Sydney Wanderers	(Italy) Napoli
7 October 2020	Teigan Collister	Newcastle Jets	Western Sydney Wanderers
9 October 2020	Nickoletta Flannery	Newcastle Jets	Canberra United
9 October 2020	Bianca Galic	(Australia) Sydney University	Canberra United
14 October 2020	Sian Fryer-McLaren	(Australia) Salisbury Inter	Adelaide United
15 October 2020	(United States) Catherine Zimmerman	(Australia) Calder United	Melbourne Victory
20 October 2020	Clare Hunt	(Australia) Sydney University	Canberra United
20 October 2020	Jessika Nash	(Australia) Football NSW	Canberra United
22 October 2020	Annalee Grove	Canberra United	Adelaide United
23 October 2020	Isabella Foletta	Perth Glory	Canberra United
27 October 2020	Leena Khamis	Canberra United	Western Sydney Wanderers
October 2020	Allira Toby	Brisbane Roar	(Portugal) Famalicão
2 November 2020	Kim Carroll	Perth Glory	Brisbane Roar
3 November 2020	Jenna Kingsley	Newcastle Jets	Retired
4 November 2020	(United States) Kayla Morrison	(Sweden) Morön	Melbourne Victory
5 November 2020	Libby Copus-Brown	Newcastle Jets	Western Sydney Wanderers
5 November 2020	Nia Stamatopoulos	Melbourne City	(Australia) Alamein
6 November 2020	Demi Koulizakis	(Australia) Sydney University	Canberra United
6 November 2020	MelindaJ Barbieri	Unattached	Melbourne Victory
6 November 2020	Morgan Aquino	Perth Glory	Brisbane Roar
6 November 2020	Leticia McKenna	Perth Glory	Brisbane Roar
10 November 2020	(United States) Kendall Fletcher	(Australia) Sydney University	Canberra United
10 November 2020	(New Zealand) Claudia Bunge	(New Zealand) Northern Lights	Melbourne Victory
10 November 2020	Emily Gielnik	(Sweden) Vittsjö	Brisbane Roar
12 November 2020	(New Zealand) Paige Satchell	(Germany) SC Sand	Canberra United
13 November 2020	Rosie Sutton	Melbourne Victory	Brisbane Roar
13 November 2020	Sharn Freier	(Australia) The Gap	Brisbane Roar
13 November 2020	(Brazil) Mariel Hecher	(Australia) Lions FC	Brisbane Roar
13 November 2020	(England) Billie Murphy	(Australia) Capalaba	Brisbane Roar
16 November 2020	Michelle Heyman	Unattached	Canberra United
19 November 2020	Margaux Chauvet	(Australia) Illawarra Stingrays	Western Sydney Wanderers
23 November 2020	(New Zealand) Olivia Chance	(England) Sheffield United	Brisbane Roar
25 November 2020	Teagan Micah	(Norway) Arna-Bjørnar	Melbourne City
25 November 2020	Hollie Palmer	Brisbane Roar	Melbourne City
26 November 2020	Nikola Orgill	(Norway) Kolbotn	Western Sydney Wanderers
26 November 2020	Leah Davidson	Brisbane Roar	Melbourne City
26 November 2020	Patricia Charalambous	Canberra United	Perth Glory
27 November 2020	Julia Sardo	Perth Glory	Melbourne City
28 November 2020	(United States) Samantha Johnson	Retirement	Melbourne City
29 November 2020	Teigen Allen	Melbourne Victory	Melbourne City
30 November 2020	Tori Tumeth	(Australia) Sydney University	Melbourne City
30 November 2020	Shannon May	Perth Glory	Unattached
2 December 2020	Kyra Cooney-Cross	Western Sydney Wanderers	Melbourne Victory (Note: Cooney-Cross signed a two-year contract.)
2 December 2020	Lisa De Vanna	Unattached	Melbourne Victory
3 December 2020	Keeley Richards	(Australia) Logan Lightning	Canberra United
3 December 2020	Isobel Dalton	(Italy) Napoli	Brisbane Roar
4 December 2020	Katrina Gorry	(Norway) Avaldsnes	Brisbane Roar (loan)
4 December 2020	Katie Offer	(Australia) North West Sydney Koalas	Sydney FC
4 December 2020	Allira Toby	(Portugal) Famalicão	Sydney FC
4 December 2020	Maja Markovski	Melbourne City	Melbourne Victory
8 December 2020	(Canada) Natalie Martineau	(Australia) South Melbourne	Melbourne Victory
9 December 2020	Marianna Tabain	(Croatia) Split	Perth Glory
9 December 2020	(Argentina) Gaby Garton	(Australia) Essendon Royals	Melbourne Victory
9 December 2020	Casey Dumont	Melbourne Victory	Unattached
10 December 2020	Natalie Tathem	Brisbane Roar	Melbourne Victory
10 December 2020	Jenna McCormick	Unattached	Melbourne City
10 December 2020	Deborah-Anne de la Harpe	(Australia) APIA Leichhardt	Perth Glory
10 December 2020	Sarah Morgan	(Australia) Sydney University	Perth Glory
11 December 2020	(New Zealand) Lily Alfeld	(New Zealand) Auckland Football Federation	Perth Glory
11 December 2020	(New Zealand) Elizabeth Anton	(New Zealand) Auckland Football Federation	Perth Glory
11 December 2020	(New Zealand) Malia Steinmetz	(New Zealand) Northern Lights	Perth Glory
16 December 2020	Bryleeh Henry	(Australia) Football NSW	Western Sydney Wanderers
16 December 2020	Rebekah Horsey	(Australia) Mitchelton FC	Brisbane Roar
18 December 2020	Jemma House	(Australia) Newcastle Olympic	Newcastle Jets
18 December 2020	Tiana Jaber	Western Sydney Wanderers	Newcastle Jets
18 December 2020	Taren King	Canberra United	Newcastle Jets
18 December 2020	Evelyn Chronis	(Australia) Northbridge	Newcastle Jets
18 December 2020	Sophie Harding	(Australia) North West Sydney Koalas	Newcastle Jets
18 December 2020	Sunny Franco	(Australia) Manly United	Newcastle Jets
18 December 2020	Chloe O'Brien	(Australia) Manly United	Newcastle Jets
18 December 2020	Alisha Bass	(Australia) North West Sydney Koalas	Newcastle Jets
18 December 2020	Rhianna Pollicina	(Australia) APIA Leichhardt	Newcastle Jets
18 December 2020	Isabel Gomez	(Australia) Football NSW	Western Sydney Wanderers
18 December 2020	Sarah Hunter	(Australia) Football NSW	Western Sydney Wanderers
18 December 2020	Aideen Keane	(Australia) Football NSW	Western Sydney Wanderers
21 December 2020	(Japan) Chinatsu Kira	(Japan) Urawa Red Diamonds	Melbourne City
21 December 2020	Meleri Mullan	(Australia) Salisbury Inter	Adelaide United
21 December 2020	(Republic of Ireland) Julie-Ann Russell	(Australia) Sydney University	Western Sydney Wanderers
22 December 2020	Rebecca Bennett	(Australia) Perth SC	Perth Glory
22 December 2020	(England) Gemma Craine	(Australia) Fremantle City	Perth Glory
22 December 2020	Tijan McKenna	(Australia) Football West NTC	Perth Glory
23 December 2020	Tiffany Eliadis	(Australia) South Melbourne	Melbourne Victory
24 December 2020	(Chile) María José Rojas	(Australia) Salisbury Inter	Adelaide United
27 December 2020	Sarah Cain	Unattached	Melbourne City
27 December 2020	Alex Chidiac	Unattached	Melbourne City
27 December 2020	Naomi Thomas-Chinnama	Unattached	Melbourne City
27 December 2020	(France) Margot Robinne	Unattached	Melbourne City
27 December 2020	Lia Muldeary	Unattached	Melbourne City
27 December 2020	Harriet Withers	Unattached	Melbourne City
28 December 2020	Emma Ilijoski	(Australia) North West Sydney Koalas	Canberra United
28 December 2020	Sasha Grove	(Australia) Canberra United Academy	Canberra United
29 December 2020	Abbey Burns	(Australia) FFSA NTC	Adelaide United
29 December 2020	Lara Kirkby	(Australia) West Adelaide	Adelaide United
29 December 2020	(England) Fiona Worts	(England) Coventry United	Adelaide United
29 December 2020	Claudia Cholakian	(Australia) Manly United	Sydney FC
29 December 2020	Liana Danaskos	Western Sydney Wanderers	Unattached
29 December 2020	Alix Roberts	Western Sydney Wanderers	Unattached
30 December 2020	Ciara Fowler	Adelaide United	Unattached
30 December 2020	Evelyn Goldsmith	Adelaide United	Unattached

=== Mid-season ===
Date	Name	Moving from	Moving to
8 January 2021	(Netherlands) Maruschka Waldus	Unattached	Adelaide United
12 January 2021	(Norway) Noor Eckhoff	(Norway) Kolbotn	Melbourne City
16 January 2021	(England) Billie Murphy	Brisbane Roar	Unattached
21 January 2021	Paige Zois	Unattached	Melbourne Victory
22 January 2021	(United States) Chantel Jones	Retirement	Canberra United
1 February 2021	Larissa Crummer	Unattached	Brisbane Roar
11 February 2021	Cassandra Zaffina	(Australia) Gold Coast United	Brisbane Roar
3 March 2021	Dylan Holmes	Adelaide United	(Sweden) Häcken
12 March 2021	Sophia Varley	(Australia) FFV NTC	Melbourne City
15 March 2021	Gabe Marzano	Unattached	Melbourne Victory
19 March 2021	Eliza Campbell	Perth Glory	Sydney FC
19 March 2021	Natasha Prior	Retired	Sydney FC
25 March 2021	Rhali Dobson	Melbourne City	Retired
28 March 2021	Clare Polkinghorne	Brisbane Roar	(Sweden) Vittsjö
28 March 2021	Emily Gielnik	Brisbane Roar	(Sweden) Vittsjö
30 March 2021	Sunny Franco	Newcastle Jets	Brisbane Roar

== Re-signings ==
Date	Name	Club
13 August 2020	Teresa Polias	Sydney FC
13 August 2020	Remy Siemsen	Sydney FC
13 August 2020	Ellie Brush	Sydney FC
13 August 2020	Princess Ibini	Sydney FC
13 August 2020	Angelique Hristodoulou	Sydney FC
13 August 2020	Taylor Ray	Sydney FC
13 August 2020	Ally Green	Sydney FC
13 August 2020	Natalie Tobin	Sydney FC
13 August 2020	Mackenzie Hawkesby	Sydney FC
13 August 2020	Elizabeth Ralston	Sydney FC
2 September 2020	Caitlin Cooper	Western Sydney Wanderers
4 September 2020	Courtney Nevin	Western Sydney Wanderers
4 September 2020	Susan Phonsongkham	Western Sydney Wanderers
5 September 2020	Danika Matos	Western Sydney Wanderers
5 September 2020	Chloe Middleton	Western Sydney Wanderers
11 September 2020	Courtney Newbon	Western Sydney Wanderers
18 September 2020	Laura Hughes (Note: Hughes spent the off-season at Þróttur.)	Canberra United
20 September 2020	Charlotte Grant	Adelaide United
21 September 2020	Emily Condon	Adelaide United
21 September 2020	Dylan Holmes	Adelaide United
21 September 2020	Isabel Hodgson	Adelaide United
23 September 2020	Chelsie Dawber	Adelaide United
23 September 2020	Matilda McNamara	Adelaide United
25 September 2020	Rachael Goldstein	Canberra United
25 September 2020	Lauren Keir	Canberra United
25 September 2020	Hayley Taylor-Young	Canberra United
25 September 2020	Emily Hodgson	Adelaide United
25 September 2020	Laura Johns	Adelaide United
28 September 2020	Georgia Campagnale	Adelaide United
6 October 2020	Rosie Galea	Western Sydney Wanderers
14 October 2020	Lia Privitelli	Melbourne Victory
16 October 2020	Angela Beard (Note: Beard spent the off-season at KR.)	Melbourne Victory
23 October 2020	Ashlie Crofts	Canberra United
27 October 2020	Melina Ayres (Note: Ayres signed a three-year extension.)	Melbourne Victory
28 October 2020	Amy Jackson	Melbourne Victory
4 November 2020	Tameka Yallop	Brisbane Roar
5 November 2020	Kaitlyn Torpey	Brisbane Roar
5 November 2020	Georgina Worth	Brisbane Roar
6 November 2020	Sally James	Canberra United
8 November 2020	Jessie Rasschaert	Canberra United
13 November 2020	Winonah Heatley	Brisbane Roar
13 November 2020	Anna Margraf	Brisbane Roar
13 November 2020	Jamilla Rankin	Brisbane Roar
20 November 2020	(New Zealand) Annalie Longo	Melbourne Victory
25 November 2020	Natasha Rigby	Perth Glory
26 November 2020	Rhali Dobson	Melbourne City
26 November 2020	Sarah Carroll	Perth Glory
26 November 2020	Caitlin Doeglas	Perth Glory
26 November 2020	Jamie-Lee Gale	Perth Glory
1 December 2020	Chelsea Blissett	Melbourne City
1 December 2020	Abbey Green	Perth Glory
1 December 2020	Hana Lowry	Perth Glory
1 December 2020	Lexie Moreno	Perth Glory
1 December 2020	Isabella Wallhead	Perth Glory
3 December 2020	Melissa Barbieri	Melbourne City
7 December 2020	Polly Doran	Melbourne Victory
8 December 2020	(Serbia) Tyla-Jay Vlajnic	Melbourne City
9 December 2020	Katarina Jukic	Perth Glory
9 December 2020	Melissa Maizels	Melbourne Victory
14 December 2020	Clare Polkinghorne (Note: Polkinghorne spent the off-season at Avaldsnes.)	Brisbane Roar
18 December 2020	Cassidy Davis	Newcastle Jets
19 December 2020	Gema Simon	Newcastle Jets
18 December 2020	Tara Andrews	Newcastle Jets
18 December 2020	Hannah Brewer	Newcastle Jets
18 December 2020	Claire Coelho	Newcastle Jets
18 December 2020	Nicole Simonsen	Newcastle Jets
18 December 2020	Lauren Allan	Newcastle Jets
18 December 2020	Tessa Tamplin	Newcastle Jets
18 December 2020	Panagiota Petratos	Newcastle Jets
20 December 2020	(United States) Mallory Weber	Adelaide United
21 December 2020	Emma Checker (Note: Checker spent the off-season at Fleury.)	Melbourne City
27 December 2020	Ella Tonkin	Adelaide United
29 December 2020	Inana Toovey	Adelaide United
29 December 2020	Kahlia Hogg	Adelaide United
10 February 2021	Erica Halloway	Western Sydney Wanderers
