= 2018–19 Adelaide United FC (women) season =

Adelaide United W-League
2018–19 season
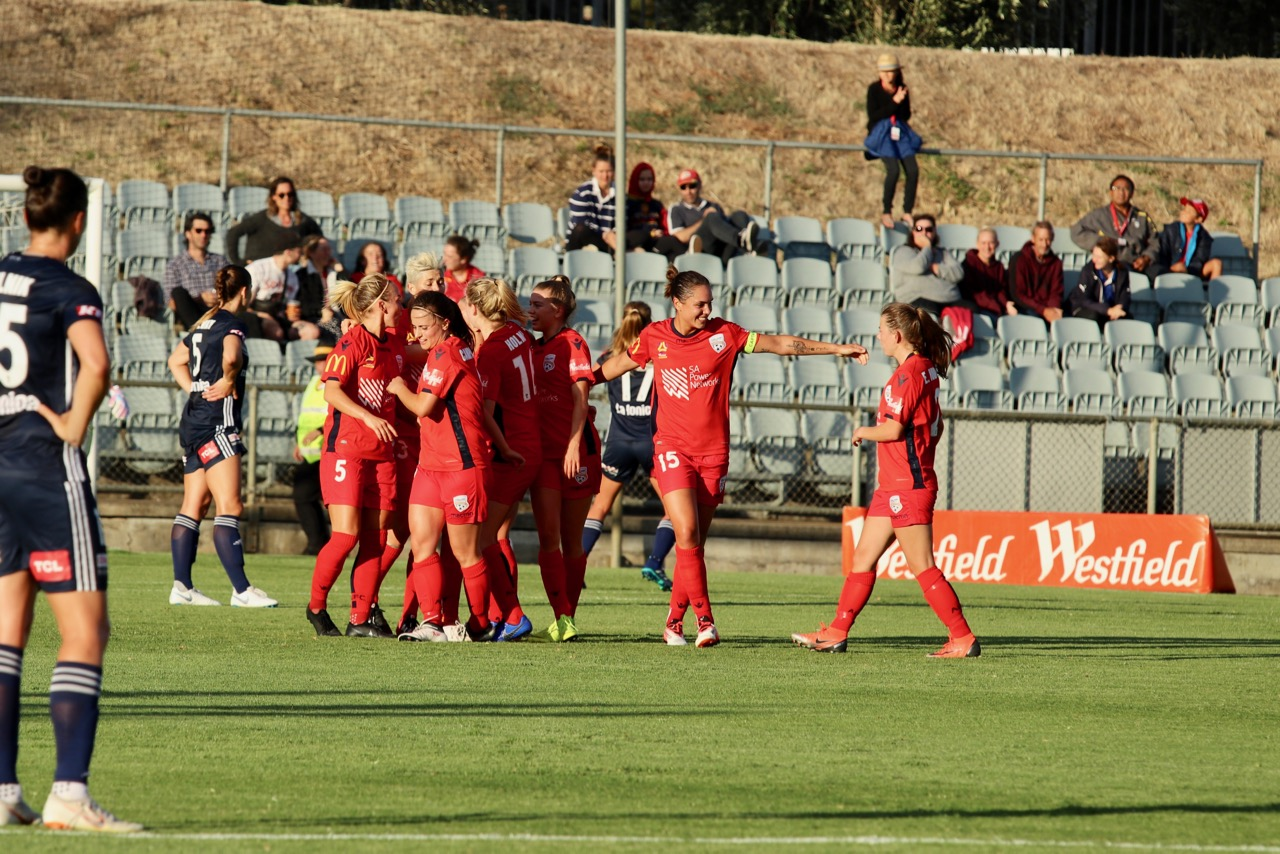
- Adelaide United in action against Melbourne Victory in December 2018
- Chairman: Piet van der Pol
- Head Coach: Ivan Karlović
- Stadium: Marden Sports Complex; Coopers Stadium
- W-League: 6th
- Top goalscorer: Veronica Latsko (9)
- Highest home attendance: 1,029 vs. Canberra United (22 November 2018); W-League
- Lowest home attendance: 672 vs. Brisbane Roar (1 February 2019); W-League
- Average home league attendance: 898
- Biggest win: 2–0 vs. Canberra United (H) (22 November 2018); W-League
- Biggest defeat: 2–5 vs. Sydney FC (A) (13 December 2018); W-League; 1–4 vs. Western Sydney Wanderers (H) (19 January 2019); W-League
Home colours	Away colours

The 2018–19 Adelaide United W-League was the club's eleventh season in the W-League, the premier competition for women's soccer in Australia. The team played home games at Marden Sports Complex and Coopers Stadium. and were managed by Ivan Karlović.

== Players ==
=== Squad information ===
Note: Flags indicate national team as defined under FIFA eligibility rules; some limited exceptions apply. Players may hold more than one non-FIFA nationality.

No.	Pos.	Nation	Player
1	GK	AUS	Sarah Willacy
2	DF	AUS	Emily Hodgson
3	DF	AUS	Charlotte Grant
5	MF	ISL	Gunnhildur Yrsa Jónsdóttir
6	MF	AUS	Georgia Campagnale
7	MF	AUS	Isabel Hodgson
8	FW	AUS	Emily Condon
9	FW	ISL	Fanndís Friðriksdóttir
10	MF	AUS	Chelsie Dawber
11	MF	AUS	Laura Johns
12	FW	USA	Veronica Latsko

No.	Pos.	Nation	Player
14	DF	AUS	Grace Abbey
15	DF	AUS	Emma Checker
16	DF	AUS	Dylan Holmes
17	DF	AUS	Kahlia Hogg
18	FW	AUS	Meleri Mullan
20	GK	AUS	Sian McLaren
21	MF	AUS	Lara Kirkby
22	DF	USA	Amber Brooks
23	FW	AUS	Michelle Heyman
30	GK	AUS	Evelyn Goldsmith

=== Transfers in ===
No.	Pos.	Nat.	Name	Age	Moving from	Type	Transfer window	Ends	Transfer fee	Source
17	DF	(Australia)	Kahlia Hogg	24	Western Sydney Wanderers	Transfer	Pre-season			
16	DF	(Australia)	Dylan Holmes	21	(Australia) Adelaide City (WNPL)	Signed	Pre-season			
5	MF	(Iceland)	Gunnhildur Jónsdóttir	30	(United States) Utah Royals FC	Loan	Pre-season			
9	FW	(Iceland)	Fanndís Fridriksdóttir	28	(Iceland) Valur	Transfer	Pre-season			
22	DF	(United States)	Amber Brooks	27	(United States) Houston Dash	Loan	Pre-season			
12	FW	(United States)	Veronica Latsko	22	(United States) Houston Dash	Loan	Pre-season			
23	FW	(Australia)	Michelle Heyman	30	Canberra United	Transfer	Pre-season			
7	MF	(Australia)	Isabel Hodgson	22	(United States) ETSU Buccaneers	Transfer	Mid-season			

=== Transfers out ===
No.	Pos.	Nat.	Name	Age	Moving to	Type	Transfer window	Transfer fee	Source
4	MF	(United States)	Alyssa Mautz	29	(United States) Chicago Red Stars	Loan Return	Pre-season		
3	MF	(United States)	Makenzy Doniak	24	(United States) North Carolina Courage	Loan Return	Pre-season		
5	MF	(Australia)	Jenna McCormick	24	Brisbane Roar	Transfer	Pre-season		
24	MF	(United States)	Danielle Colaprico	25	(United States) Chicago Red Stars	Loan Return	Pre-season		
25	DF	(United States)	Katie Naughton	24	(United States) Chicago Red Stars	Loan Return	Pre-season		
10	MF	(Australia)	Alex Chidiac	19	(Spain) Atlético Madrid	Transfer	Pre-season		
1	GK	(Australia)	Eliza Campbell	24	Perth Glory	Transfer	Pre-season		
9	FW	(Australia)	Adriana Jones	23	Melbourne City	Transfer	Pre-season		

== W-League ==
=== League table ===
Pos	Team	Pld	W	D	L	GF	GA	GD	Pts	Qualification
1	Melbourne Victory	12	7	3	2	21	15	+6	24	Qualification to Finals series and 2019 AFC Women's Club Championship
2	Brisbane Roar	12	6	2	4	18	17	+1	20	Qualification to Finals series
3	Sydney FC (C)	12	6	1	5	28	19	+9	19	Qualification to Finals series
4	Perth Glory	12	5	4	3	28	20	+8	19	Qualification to Finals series
5	Melbourne City	12	6	1	5	20	15	+5	19	
6	Adelaide United	12	5	3	4	17	19	−2	18	
7	Newcastle Jets	12	5	1	6	18	21	−3	16	
8	Canberra United	12	3	4	5	13	18	−5	13	
9	Western Sydney Wanderers	12	1	1	10	11	30	−19	4	

Source: A-Leagues
Rules for classification: 1) points; 2) goal difference; 3) number of goals scored.
(C) Champions

=== Matches ===
Win Draw Loss

28 October 2018 1	Melbourne Victory	0–0	Adelaide United	Melbourne
		Report		Stadium: AAMI Park; Attendance: 2,714; Referee: Isabella Blaes

18 November 2018 3	Brisbane Roar	0–1	Adelaide United	Brisbane
		Report	Latsko 51'	Stadium: Lions Stadium; Attendance: 1,286; Referee: Lara Lee

22 November 2018 4	Adelaide United	2–0	Canberra United	Adelaide
	Latsko 27'; Prior 86' (o.g.)	Report		Stadium: Coopers Stadium; Attendance: 1,029; Referee: Kate Jacewicz

1 December 2018 5	Melbourne City	1–1	Adelaide United	Melbourne
	Simon 54' (pen.)	Report	Campagnale 90+7'	Stadium: CB Smith Reserve; Attendance: 500; Referee: Lara Lee

6 December 2018 6	Adelaide United	2–2	Perth Glory	Adelaide
	Latsko 22', 79'	Report	Kerr 40', 45+2'	Stadium: Marden Sports Complex; Attendance: 1,007; Referee: Katie Patterson

13 December 2018 7	Sydney FC	5–2	Adelaide United	Sydney
	Huerta 45+4'; Colaprico 58'; McCaskill 71'; Ibini 88', 90+4'	Report	Latsko 22', 66'	Stadium: Cromer Park; Attendance: 2,226; Referee: Rachel Mitchenson

21 December 2018 8	Adelaide United	3–2	Melbourne Victory	Adelaide
	Latsko 30'; Heyman 74' (pen.); Condon 77'	Report	Mastrantonio 87'; Alleway 90+1'	Stadium: Marden Sports Complex; Attendance: 902; Referee: Katie Patterson

31 December 2018 9	Newcastle Jets	2–3	Adelaide United	Newcastle
	Collister 21'; Johns 85' (o.g.)	Report	Friðriksdóttir 57'; I. Hodgson 90+2'; Latsko 90+4'	Stadium: McDonald Jones Stadium; Attendance: 1,065; Referee: Casey Reibelt

13 January 2019 11	Canberra United	1–0	Adelaide United	Canberra
	Carpenter 59'	Report		Stadium: McKellar Park; Attendance: 1,486; Referee: Rachel Mitchenson

19 January 2019 12	Adelaide United	1–4	Western Sydney Wanderers	Adelaide
	Latsko 41'	Report	Lowe 2'; Ledbrook 61' (pen.); Halloway 90'; Addo 90+7'	Stadium: Marden Sports Complex; Attendance: 937; Referee: Isabella Blaess

25 January 2019 13	Adelaide United	1–2	Newcastle Jets	Adelaide
	Friðriksdóttir 29'	Report	Wright 22' (pen.); Petratos 90+1'	Stadium: Marden Sports Complex; Attendance: 842; Referee: Rebecca Durcau

1 February 2019 14	Adelaide United	1–0	Brisbane Roar	Adelaide
	Jonsdottir 13'	Report		Stadium: Marden Sports Complex; Attendance: 672; Referee: Rachel Mitchenson

=== Results summary ===
Overall								Home						Away					
Pld	W	D	L	GF	GA	GD	Pts	W	D	L	GF	GA	GD	W	D	L	GF	GA	GD
12	5	3	4	17	19	−2	18	3	1	2	10	10	0	2	2	2	7	9	−2

Last updated: February 2019, end of regular season.
Source: Competitive Matches

=== Results by round ===
Round	1	2	3	4	5	6	7	8	9	10	11	12	13	14
Ground	A	B	A	H	A	H	A	H	A	B	A	H	H	H
Result	D	✖	W	W	D	D	L	W	W	✖	L	L	L	W
Position	5	7	4	3	3	3	5	4	2	3	5	6	6	6

Updated to match(es) played on February 2019. Source: Competitive Matches
A = Away; H = Home; B = Bye; W = Win; D = Draw; L = Loss
