= 2017–18 Adelaide United FC (women) season =

Adelaide United
2017–18 season
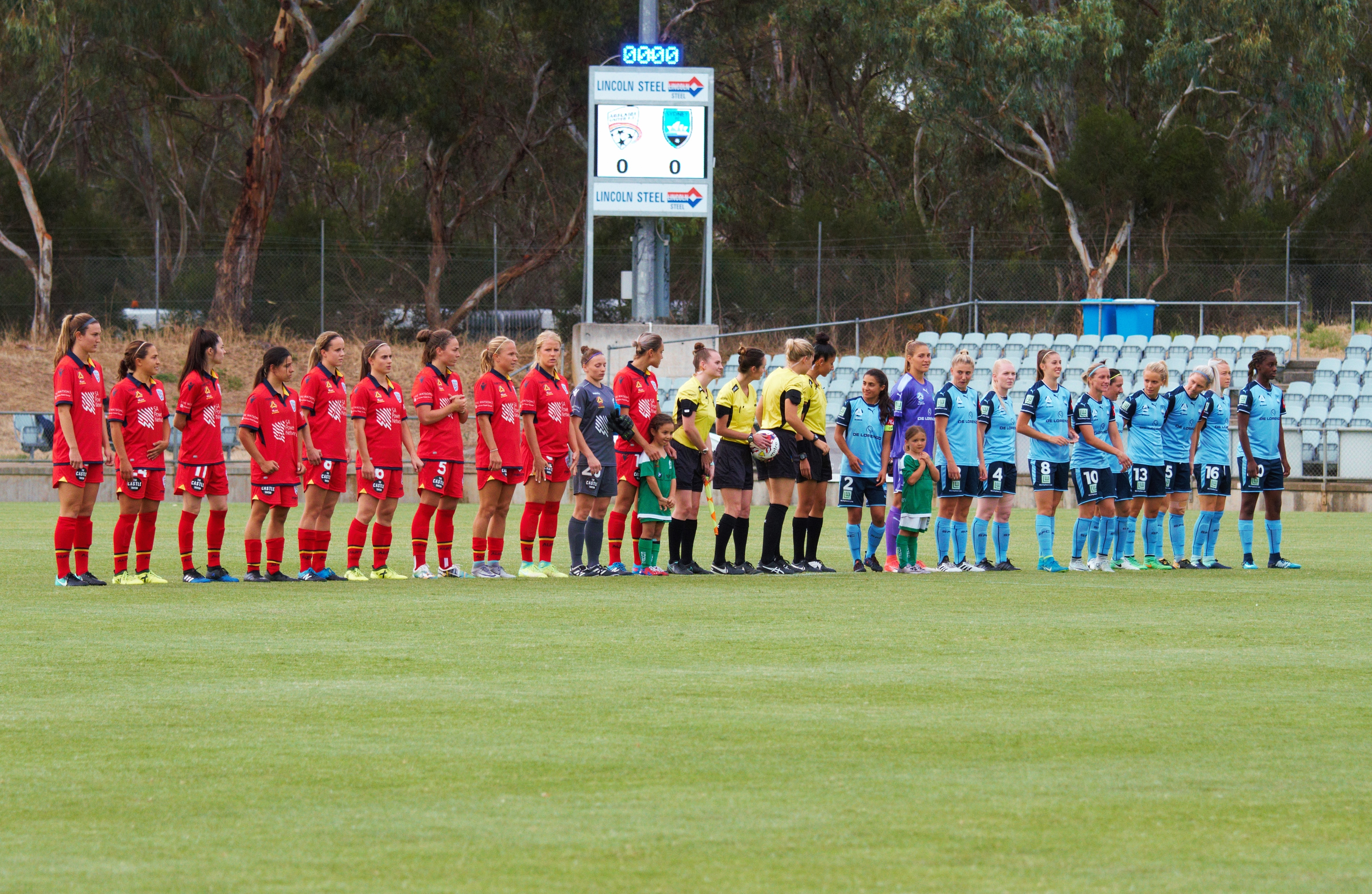
- Adelaide United lining up prior to match against Sydney FC in December 2017
- Manager: Ivan Karlović
- Stadium: Marden Sports Complex
- W-League: 9th
- Top goalscorer: Makenzy Doniak (7)
- Highest home attendance: 1,015 vs. Sydney FC (29 December 2017); W-League
- Lowest home attendance: 630 vs. Brisbane Roar (28 January 2018); W-League
- Average home league attendance: 814
- Biggest win: 3–1 vs. Perth Glory (H) (10 November 2017); W-League
- Biggest defeat: 1–6 vs. Canberra United (A) (7 January 2018); W-League
Home colours	Away colours

The 2017–18 Adelaide United W-League was the club's tenth season in the W-League, the premier competition for women's football in Australia. The team played home games at Marden Sports Complex and was managed by Ivan Karlović.

== Players ==
=== Squad information ===
Note: Flags indicate national team as defined under FIFA eligibility rules; some limited exceptions apply. Players may hold more than one non-FIFA nationality.

No.	Pos.	Nation	Player
1	GK	AUS	Eliza Campbell
2	DF	AUS	Emily Hodgson
3	MF	USA	Makenzy Doniak (on loan from North Carolina Courage)
4	MF	USA	Alyssa Mautz (on loan from Chicago Red Stars)
5	DF	AUS	Jenna McCormick
6	MF	AUS	Georgia Campagnale
8	FW	AUS	Emily Condon
9	FW	AUS	Adriana Jones
10	MF	AUS	Alex Chidiac

No.	Pos.	Nation	Player
11	MF	AUS	Laura Johns
12	MF	AUS	Chelsie Dawber
13	MF	AUS	Nora Peat
14	DF	AUS	Grace Abbey
15	DF	AUS	Emma Checker (Captain)
16	MF	AUS	Katelyn Tucker
20	GK	AUS	Sarah Willacy
24	MF	USA	Danielle Colaprico (on loan from Chicago Red Stars)
25	DF	USA	Katie Naughton (on loan from Chicago Red Stars)
30	GK	AUS	Evelyn Goldsmith

=== Transfers in ===
No.	Pos.	Nat.	Name	Age	Moving from	Type	Transfer window	Ends	Transfer fee	Source
15	DF	(Australia)	Emma Checker	21	(South Korea) Incheon Red Angels	Transfer	Pre-season			
5	MF	(Australia)	Jenna McCormick	23	(Norway) Medkila	Transfer	Pre-season		Free	
11	MF	(Australia)	Laura Johns	23		Transfer	Pre-season			
3	MF	(United States)	Makenzy Doniak	23	(United States) North Carolina Courage	Loan	Pre-season		Free	
4	MF	(United States)	Alyssa Mautz	28	(United States) Chicago Red Stars	Loan	Pre-season		Free	
12	MF	(Australia)	Chelsie Dawber	17		Transfer	Pre-season		Free	
13	MF	(Australia)	Nora Peat	18		Transfer	Pre-season			
16	MF	(Australia)	Katelyn Tucker	24		Transfer	Pre-season		Free	

=== Transfers out ===
No.	Pos.	Nat.	Name	Age	Moving to	Type	Transfer window	Transfer fee	Source
11	FW	(United States)	Sofia Huerta	24	(United States) Chicago Red Stars	Loan return	Pre-season	Free	
5	DF	(Brazil)	Mônica	30	(United States) Orlando Pride	Loan return	Pre-season	Free	
7	FW	(Australia)	Stella Rigon	28		Transfer	Pre-season	Free	

=== Contract extensions ===
No.	Name	Position	Duration	Date	Notes

== Managerial staff ==
Position	Name
Head coach	(Australia) Ivan Karlović
Assistant coach	(Australia) Simon Catanzaro
Team manager	

== Squad statistics ==
N	Pos.	Nat.	Name	Total					W-League
N	Pos.	Nat.	Name	Apps	Goals	Yellow card	Second yellow card	Red card	Apps	Goals	Yellow card	Second yellow card	Red card
1	GK	(Australia)	Eliza Campbell	3	0	0	0	0	3+0	0	0	0	0
2	DF	(Australia)	Emily Hodgson	6	0	0	0	0	5+1	0	0	0	0
3	MF	(United States)	Makenzy Doniak	12	7	1	0	0	12+0	7	1	0	0
4	MF	(United States)	Alyssa Mautz	12	2	2	0	0	12+0	2	2	0	0
5	DF	(Australia)	Jenna McCormick	12	1	2	0	0	12+0	1	2	0	0
6	MF	(Australia)	Georgia Campagnale	12	0	1	0	0	12+0	0	1	0	0
8	FW	(Australia)	Emily Condon	12	1	0	0	0	9+3	1	0	0	0
9	FW	(Australia)	Adriana Jones	9	0	1	0	0	6+3	0	1	0	0
10	MF	(Australia)	Alex Chidiac	11	1	0	0	0	11+0	1	0	0	0
11	MF	(Australia)	Laura Johns	9	0	0	0	0	3+6	0	0	0	0
12	MF	(Australia)	Chelsie Dawber	9	0	0	0	0	1+8	0	0	0	0
13	MF	(Australia)	Nora Peat	5	0	0	0	0	1+4	0	0	0	0
14	DF	(Australia)	Grace Abbey	3	0	0	0	0	1+2	0	0	0	0
15	DF	(Australia)	Emma Checker	12	0	1	0	0	12+0	0	1	0	0
16	MF	(Australia)	Katelyn Tucker	2	0	0	0	0	0+2	0	0	0	0
17	DF	(Australia)	Nicole Calder	0	0	0	0	0	0+0	0	0	0	0
20	GK	(Australia)	Sarah Willacy	9	0	0	0	0	9+0	0	0	0	0
24	MF	(United States)	Danielle Colaprico	11	1	0	0	0	11+0	1	0	0	0
25	DF	(United States)	Katie Naughton	12	2	0	0	0	12+0	2	0	0	0
30	GK	(Australia)	Evelyn Goldsmith	0	0	0	0	0	0+0	0	0	0	0

- Source: au.women.soccerway.com
- (yellow card) = Number of bookings; (second yellow card) = Number of sending offs after a second yellow card; (red card) = Number of sending offs by a direct red card.

== Competitions ==
=== W-League ===
==== League table ====
Pos	Team	Pld	W	D	L	GF	GA	GD	Pts	Qualification
1	Brisbane Roar	12	9	1	2	21	12	+9	28	Qualification to Finals series
2	Sydney FC	12	8	1	3	26	16	+10	25	Qualification to Finals series
3	Newcastle Jets	12	6	2	4	26	21	+5	20	Qualification to Finals series
4	Melbourne City (C)	12	6	2	4	20	15	+5	20	Qualification to Finals series
5	Canberra United	12	5	1	6	24	27	−3	16	
6	Perth Glory	12	4	2	6	25	27	−2	14	
7	Melbourne Victory	12	3	2	7	15	19	−4	11	
8	Western Sydney Wanderers	12	3	2	7	13	21	−8	11	
9	Adelaide United	12	3	1	8	15	27	−12	10	

Source: A-Leagues
Rules for classification: 1) points; 2) goal difference; 3) number of goals scored.
(C) Champions

==== Results summary ====
Overall								Home						Away					
Pld	W	D	L	GF	GA	GD	Pts	W	D	L	GF	GA	GD	W	D	L	GF	GA	GD
12	3	1	8	15	27	−12	10	2	0	4	10	12	−2	1	1	4	5	15	−10

Source: Competitive Matches

==== Results by round ====
Round	1	2	3	4	5	6	7	8	9	10	11	12	13	14
Ground	B	A	H	A	H	A	A	H	H	A	A	B	H	H
Result	✖	L	W	L	L	D	L	L	L	L	W	✖	L	W
Position	5	7	5	6	8	7	9	9	9	9	9	9	9	9

Source: Competitive Matches
A = Away; H = Home; B = Bye; W = Win; D = Draw; L = Loss

==== Matches ====
Win Draw Loss

3 November 2017 2	Western Sydney Wanderers	2–1	Adelaide United	Sydney
19:30 AEDT	LaBonta 13'; Sutton 90+1'	Report	Doniak 22'	Stadium: Marconi Stadium; Attendance: 532; Referee: Casey Reibelt

10 November 2017 3	Adelaide United	3–1	Perth Glory	Adelaide
16:50 ACDT	Doniak 4', 31', 74'	Report	Checker 50' (o.g.)	Stadium: Marden Sports Complex; Attendance: 947; Referee: Lara Lee

17 November 2017 4	Brisbane Roar	1–0	Adelaide United	Brisbane
16:20 AEST	Raso 86'	Report		Stadium: Suncorp Stadium; Attendance: 2,127; Referee: Rebecca Durcau

25 November 2017 5	Adelaide United	1–2	Newcastle Jets	Adelaide
19:00 AEDT	Naughton 51'	Report	Stengel 32'; Huster 49'	Stadium: Marden Sports Complex; Attendance: 835; Referee: Kelly Jones

3 December 2017 6	Melbourne City	1–1	Adelaide United	Melbourne
17:00 AEDT	Hatch 14'	Report	Mautz 73'	Stadium: Lakeside Stadium; Attendance: 426; Referee: Kate Jacewicz

9 December 2017 7	Melbourne Victory	4–0	Adelaide United	Melbourne
16:30 AEDT	Dowie 11', 50'; Jeon 33'; Privitelli 37'	Report		Stadium: Lakeside Stadium; Attendance: 637; Referee: Rachel Mitchenson

15 December 2017 8	Adelaide United	1–2	Western Sydney Wanderers	Adelaide
20:00 ACST	Doniak 31'	Report	Pieëte 23'; Falkon 72'	Stadium: Marden Sports Complex; Attendance: 739; Referee: Rebecca Durcau

29 December 2017 9	Adelaide United	1–2	Sydney FC	Adelaide
20:00 AEDT	Chidiac 55' (pen.)	Report	Ledbrook 26'; Foord 90+3'	Stadium: Marden Sports Complex; Attendance: 1,015; Referee: Katie Patterson

7 January 2018 10	Canberra United	6–1	Adelaide United	Canberra
18:30 AEDT	Carpenter 4'; Thorsnes 38', 47', 53'; Sykes 44'; Roestbakken 52'	Report	Mautz 11'	Stadium: McKellar Park; Attendance: 1,050; Referee: Kate Jacewicz

12 January 2018 11	Newcastle Jets	1–2	Adelaide United	Newcastle
17:20 AEDT	Stengel 28'	Report	Colaprico 21'; Naughton 43'	Stadium: McDonald Jones Stadium; Attendance: 4,112; Referee: Rebecca Durcau

28 January 2018 13	Adelaide United	2–4	Brisbane Roar	Adelaide
16:00 ACDT	Doniak 22'; Condon 60'	Report	Raso 20'; Toby 74'; McCormick 83' (o.g.); Gielnik 90+1'	Stadium: Marden Sports Complex; Attendance: 630; Referee: Kelly Jones

2 February 2018 14	Adelaide United	2–1	Melbourne Victory	Adelaide
19:30 ACDT	Doniak 17'; McCormick 57'	Report	Cooney-Cross 41'	Stadium: Marden Sports Complex; Attendance: 719; Referee: Katie Patterson

== See also ==
- 2017–18 Adelaide United FC season
