= List of Adelaide United FC (women) records and statistics =

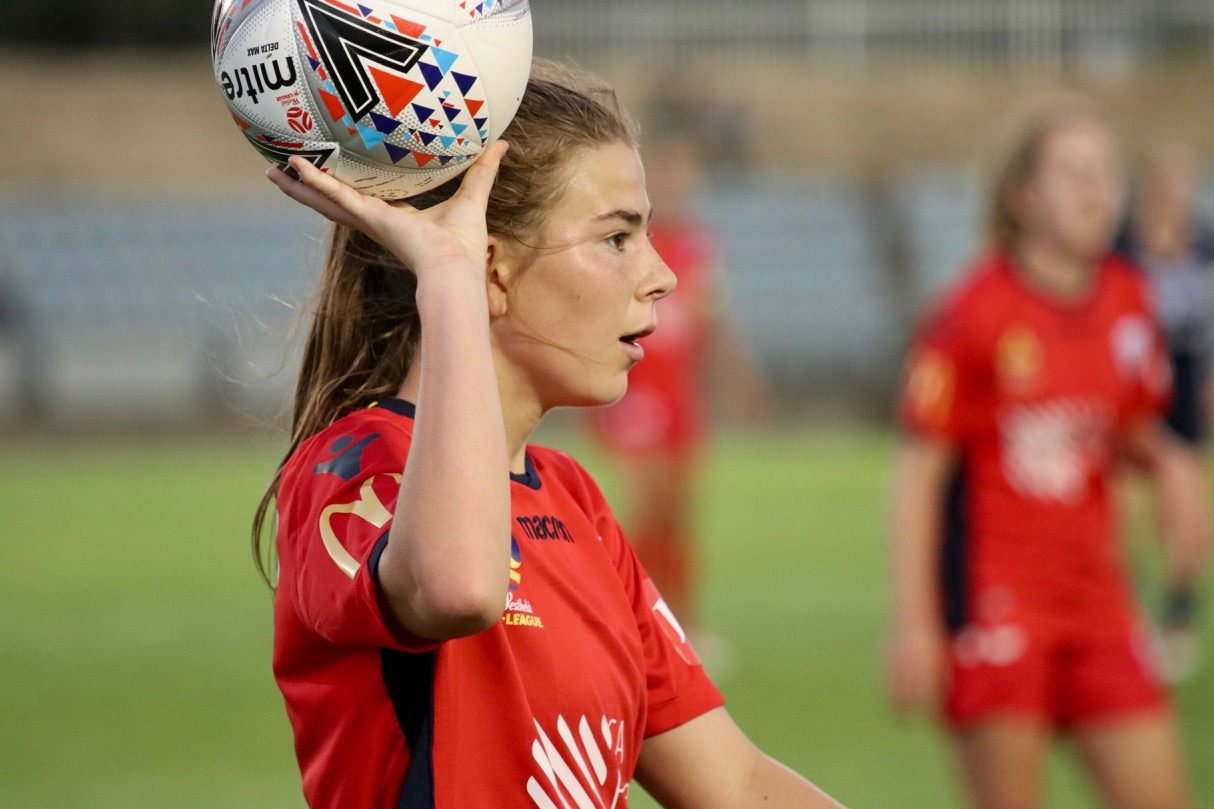
Emily Hodgson has the second-most appearances for Adelaide United (women).

Adelaide United Football Club (women) is an Australian professional women's association football club based in Hindmarsh, Adelaide. The club was formed in 2008 within the formation of the W-League (now A-League Women).

The list encompasses the records set by the club, their managers and their players. The player records section itemises the club's leading goalscorers and those who have made most appearances in first-team competitions. Attendance records at Hindmarsh, and Marden Sports Complex are also included.

The club's record appearance maker is Emily Condon, who made 117 appearances between 2014 and 2025. Chelsie Dawber is currently Adelaide United (women)'s record goalscorer, scoring 28 goals in total.

All figures are correct as of 31 January 2025.

== Player records ==
=== Appearances ===
- Most appearances: Emily Condon, 117
- Youngest first-team player: Emily Condon, 15 years, 126 days (against Canberra United, W-League, 5 January 2014)
- Oldest first-team player: Kristy Moore, 37 years, 305 days (against Newcastle Jets, W-League, 29 November 2014)
- Most consecutive appearances: Georgia Campagnale, 41 (from 17 October 2015 to 1 December 2018)

==== Most appearances ====
Competitive matches only, includes appearances as substitute. Numbers in brackets indicate goals scored.

Rank	Player	Years	A-League Women		Total
Rank	Player	Years	Regular season	Finals series	Total
1	(Australia) Emily Condon	2013–	116 (21)	1 (0)	117 (21)
2	(Australia) Emily Hodgson	2016–	115 (2)	1 (0)	116 (2)
3	(Australia) Isabel Hodgson	2013–2015; 2019–	94 (7)	1 (0)	95 (7)
4	(Australia) Dylan Holmes	2014–2015; 2018–2021; 2021–	90 (8)	1 (0)	91 (8)
5	(Australia) Chelsie Dawber	2017–2022; 2022–2023; 2023–	76 (28)	1 (0)	77 (28)
6	(Australia) Georgia Campagnale	2014–2015; 2018–2021; 2021–	72 (1)	0 (0)	72 (1)
7	(Australia) Rachael Quigley	2008–2013; 2013–2014; 2016–2017	66 (18)	0 (0)	66 (18)
8	(Japan) Nanako Sasaki	2021–	55 (3)	1 (1)	56 (4)
9	(Australia) Annalee Grove	2021–	52 (0)	1 (0)	53 (0)
9	(Australia) Jenna McCormick	2012–2015; 2017–2018; 2022–2023	53 (1)	0 (0)	53 (1)

=== Goalscorers ===
- Most goals in a season: Fiona Worts, 13 goals (in the 2021–22 season)
- Youngest goalscorer: Emily Condon, 15 years, 132 days (against Western Sydney Wanderers, W-League, 11 January 2014)
- Oldest goalscorer: Kristy Moore, 37 years, 270 days (against Perth Glory, W-League, 25 October 2014)

==== Top goalscorers ====
Competitive matches only. Numbers in brackets indicate appearances made.

Rank	Player	Years	A-League Women		Total
Rank	Player	Years	Regular season	Finals series	Total
1	(Australia) Chelsie Dawber	2017–2022; 2022–2023; 2023–	28 (76)	0 (1)	28 (77)
2	(England) Fiona Worts	2020–2023; 2024–	25 (49)	0 (1)	25 (50)
3	(Australia) Emily Condon	2013–	21 (116)	0 (1)	21 (117)
4	(Australia) Rachael Quigley	2008–2013; 2013–2014; 2016–2017	18 (66)	0 (0)	18 (66)
5	(United States) Sarah Langman	2018–2019	9 (20)	0 (0)	9 (20)
5	(United States) Vernoica Latsko	2018–2019	9 (12)	0 (0)	9 (12)
7	(Australia) Dylan Holmes	2014–2015; 2018–2021; 2021–	8 (90)	0 (1)	8 (91)
7	(United States) Sofia Huerta	2016–2017	8 (12)	0 (0)	8 (12)
7	(England) Kristy Moore	2012–2014	8 (27)	0 (0)	8 (27)
10	(United States) Makenzy Doniak	2017–2018	7 (12)	0 (0)	7 (12)
10	(Australia) Isabel Hodgson	2013–2015; 2019–	7 (94)	0 (1)	7 (95)
10	(Australia) Tiarn Powell	2013–2016	7 (34)	0 (0)	7 (34)

== Head coach records ==
- First full-time head coached: Michael Barnett head coached Adelaide United (women) from July 2008 to June 2011
- Longest-serving head coach: Adrian Stenta – 5 years, 84 days (4 August 2020 to present).
- Shortest tunure as head coach: Mark Jones – 15 days (7 September 2016 to 22 September 2016).
- Highest win percentage: Adrian Stenta, 37.68%
- Lowest win percentage: Michael Barnett, 6.67%

== Club records ==
=== Matches ===
==== Firsts ====
- First match: Queensland Roar 4–1 Adelaide United, W-League, 25 October 2008
- First finals match: Adelaide United 1–2 Melbourne Victory, Elimination-finals, 13 March 2022
- First home match at Hindmarsh: Adelaide United 3–2 Newcastle Jets, W-League, 31 October 2008
- First home match at Marden Sports Complex: Adelaide United 3–1 Perth Glory, W-League, 10 November 2017

==== Record results ====
- Record win: 10–2 against Western Sydney Wanderers, W-League, 14 January 2017
- Record defeat: 0–8 against Newcastle Jets, A-League Women, 29 March 2023
- Record finals defeat: Adelaide United 1–2 Melbourne Victory, Elimination-finals, 13 March 2022

==== Record consecutive results ====
- Record consecutive wins: 3
  - from 19 October 2014 to 29 October 2014
  - from 14 January 2017 to 29 January 2017
  - from 9 January 2021 to 21 January 2021
  - from 21 January 2022 to 4 February 2022
  - from 13 February 2022 to 26 February 2022
- Record consecutive defeats: 19, from 28 November 2009 to 10 December 2011
- Record consecutive matches without a defeat: 7, from 2 February 2018 to 6 December 2018
- Record consecutive matches without a win: 34, from 15 November 2008 to 10 December 2011
- Record consecutive matches without conceding a goal: 4, from 11 March 2018 to 22 November 2018
- Record consecutive matches without scoring a goal: 5
  - from 5 October 2009 to 1 November 2009
  - from 10 November 2012 to 8 December 2012

=== Goals ===
- Most league goals scored in a season: 33 in 14 matches, A-League Women, 2021–22
- Fewest league goals scored in a season: 4 in 10 matches, W-League, 2010–11
- Most league goals conceded in a season: 56 in 22 matches, A-League Women, 2023–24
- Fewest league goals conceded in a season: 12 in 12 matches, W-League, 2015–16

=== Points ===
- Most points in a season: 27 in 14 matches, A-League Women, 2021–22
- Fewest points in a season: 0 in 10 matches, W-League, 2010–11

=== Attendances ===
This section applies to attendances at Hindmarsh, where Adelaide United (women) would normally play their home matches, and Marden Sports Complex.

- Highest attendance at Hindmarsh: 5,159, against Western Sydney Wanderers, W-League, 21 March 2021
- Lowest attendance at Hindmarsh: 1,024, against Wellington Phoenix, A-League Women, 21 January 2022
- Highest attendance at Marden Sports Complex: 1,105, against Melbourne Victory, W-League, 29 January 2021
- Lowest attendance at Marden Sports Complex: 565, against Perth Glory, W-League, 3 March 2020
