= Charli Grant =

Australian soccer player (born 2001)

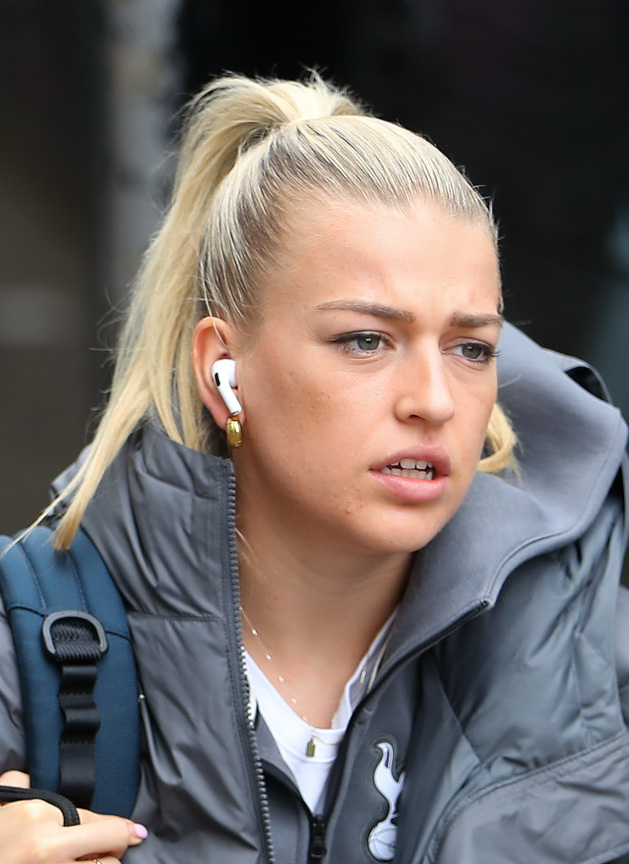
- Grant in 2024

Personal information
- Full name: Charlotte Layne Grant
- Date of birth: 20 September 2001 (age 25)
- Place of birth: Adelaide, South Australia, Australia
- Height: 1.65 m (5 ft 5 in)
- Positions: Full-back; winger

Team information
- Current team: Malmö
- Number: 3

Youth career
- Cumberland United

Senior career*
Years	Team	Apps	(Gls)
2018–2021	Adelaide United	34	(0)
2021–2022	Rosengård	18	(1)
2022	→ Vittsjö (loan)	10	(0)
2023	Vittsjö	23	(2)
2024–2026	Tottenham Hotspur	23	(0)
2026–	Malmö	4	(1)

International career^{‡}
2019	Australia U20	6	(0)
2022–	Australia U23	4	(0)
2021–	Australia	39	(2)
- * Club domestic league appearances and goals as of 12 September 2026 ‡ National team caps and goals as of 28 October 2025

Charlotte Layne Grant (born 20 September 2001) is an Australian professional soccer player who plays as a defender for Damallsvenskan club Malmö FF and the Australia national team.

== Club career ==
In October 2018, Grant signed for Adelaide United along with United States international, Amber Brooks. She made her Adelaide debut on 18 November 2018, being replaced by Fanndís Friðriksdóttir in a 1–0 win over Brisbane Roar.

In April 2021, Grant went overseas, joining Swedish Damallsvenskan club Rosengård.

In August 2022, Grant went on loan to fellow Swedish club Vittsjö before permanently moving to the club in January 2023. On 15 November 2023, Grant announced she would be departing the club.

In January 2024 after the expiration of her contract she joined Tottenham Hotspur on a contract until 2026. On 14 January she made her debut for the club in the 3–2 FA Cup victory over Sheffield United, playing the entire match. She departed from Tottenham upon the expiration of her contract in the summer of 2026.

On 13 July 2026, Grant returned to the Damallsvenskan, signing for Malmö on a contract until 2029.

== International career ==
In September 2021, Grant made her debut for the Australian senior team in a friendly against the Republic of Ireland.

Grant was a member of the Matildas Tokyo 2020 Olympics squad. The Matildas qualified for the quarter-finals and beat Great Britain before being eliminated in the semi-final with Sweden. In the playoff for the bronze medal they were beaten by the USA.

At the 2022 AFF Women's Championship, the defender captained the Australia women's national under-23 soccer team (U23 Matildas) for their first-ever matches in July in the Philippines, where they competed against senior national women's squads. In April 2023, Grant scored her first international goal for the Matidas in a 2–0 win over England in a friendly.

== Personal life ==
Grant announced via Instagram in December 2024 she was engaged to Lachlan Cameron.

Two of Grant's best friends are fellow Matildas Kyra Cooney-Cross and Katrina Gorry (of whom she describes as a "second mum", with her daughter Harper as like a sister). She describes fellow Matildas defenders Ellie Carpenter and Steph Catley as her biggest role models.

== Career statistics ==
=== Club ===
As of match played 16 May 2026

Appearances and goals by club, season and competition
Club	Season	League			National cup (Note: includes Swedish Cup, Women's FA Cup)		League cup (Note: includes Women's League Cup)		Continental (Note: includes UEFA Women's Champions League)		Total	
Club	Season	Division	Apps	Goals	Apps	Goals	Apps	Goals	Apps	Goals	Apps	Goals
Adelaide United	2018–19	A-League	11	0	—		—		—		11	0
Adelaide United	2019–20	A-League	12	0	—		—		—		12	0
Adelaide United	2020–21	A-League	11	0	—		—		—		11	0
Adelaide United	Total		34	0	0	0	0	0	0	0	34	0
FC Rosengård	2021	Damallsvenskan	8	0	4	0	—		1	0	13	0
FC Rosengård	2022	Damallsvenskan	10	1	0	0	—		0	0	10	1
FC Rosengård	Total		18	1	4	0	0	0	1	0	23	1
Vittsjö GIK (loan)	2022	Damallsvenskan	10	0	4	0	—		—		14	0
Vittsjö GIK	2023	Damallsvenskan	23	2	1	0	—		—		24	2
Tottenham Hotspur	2023–24	Women's Super League	8	0	4	0	2	1	—		14	1
Tottenham Hotspur	2024–25	Women's Super League	10	0	1	0	3	0	—		14	0
Tottenham Hotspur	2025–26	Women's Super League	5	0	0	0	2	0	—		7	0
Tottenham Hotspur	Total		23	0	5	0	7	1	0	0	35	1
Career total			108	3	14	0	7	1	1	0	130	4

=== International ===
As of match played 8 July 2025

Appearances and goals by national team and year
National team	Year	Apps	Goals
Australia	2021	3	0
Australia	2022	10	0
Australia	2023	8	1
Australia	2024	8	0
Australia	2025	9	1
Total		38	2

Scores and results list Australia's goal tally first, score column indicates score after each Grant goal.

List of international goals scored by Charli Grant
No.	Date	Venue	Opponent	Score	Result	Competition
1	11 April 2023	Brentford Community Stadium, Brentford, England	England	2–0	2–0	Friendly
2	8 July 2025	HBF Park, Perth, Australia	Panama	3–2	3–2	Friendly
