= Kahlia Hogg =

Australian soccer player

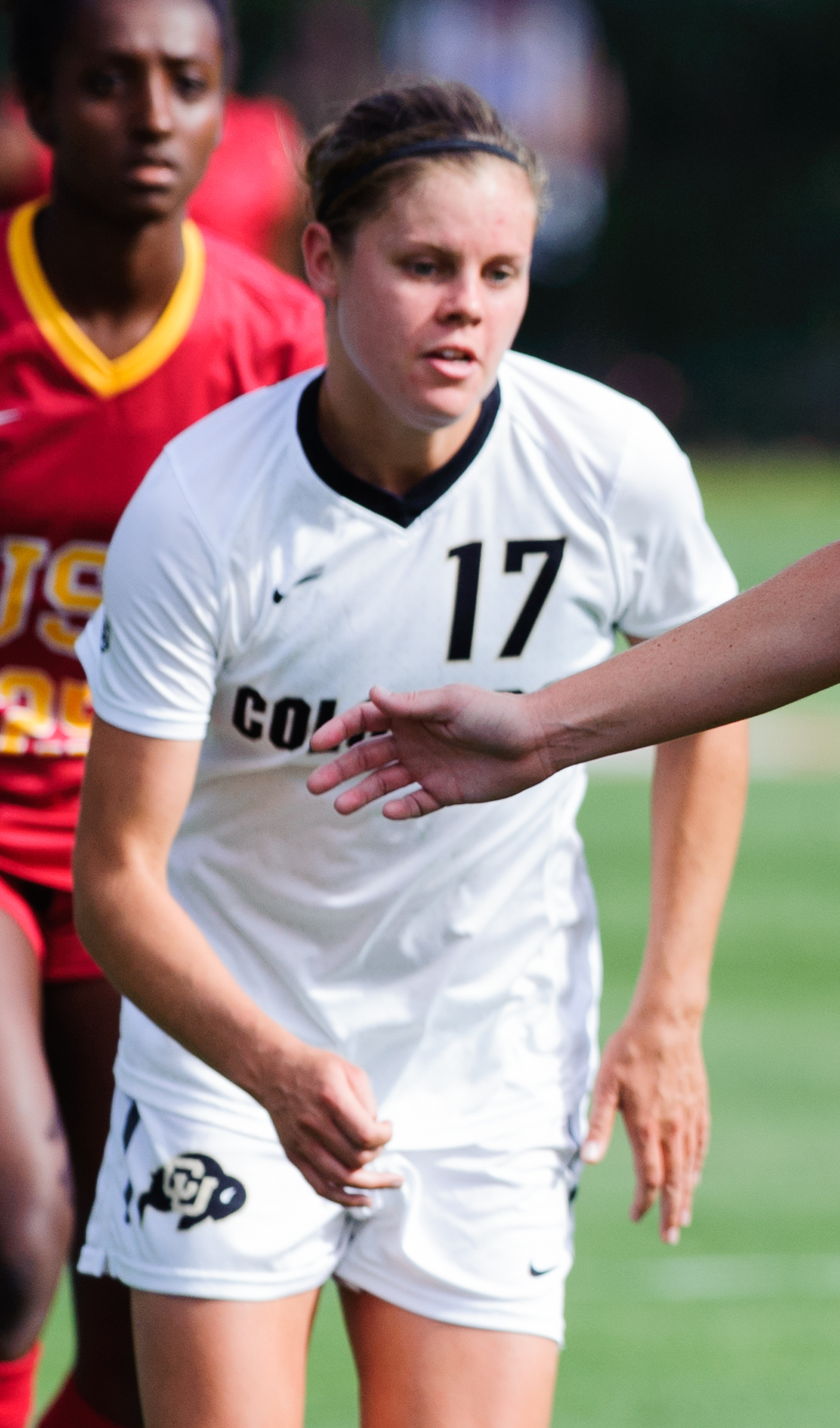
- Hogg playing for Colorado Buffaloes in 2014

Personal information
- Full name: Kahlia Hogg
- Date of birth: 9 December 1993 (age 32)
- Place of birth: Canberra, Australia
- Height: 5 ft 6 in (1.68 m)
- Positions: Midfielder; defender

Youth career
- Majura FC
- 2006–2008: Chelsea Centre of Excellence

College career
Years	Team	Apps	(Gls)
2012–2013	Florida State Seminoles	18	(0)
2014–2016	Colorado Buffaloes	44	(5)

Senior career*
Years	Team	Apps	(Gls)
2009–2011	Canberra United	24	(1)
2012	Pali Blues	10	(0)
2017	Canberra United	2	(0)
2017–2018	Western Sydney Wanderers	11	(0)
2018–2021	Adelaide United	17	(0)

International career
- Australia U-17
- Australia U-20
- * Club domestic league appearances and goals as of 29 December 2020

Kahlia Hogg (born 9 December 1993) is an Australian soccer player who last played for Adelaide United in the Australian W-League. Hogg previously played for Canberra United, the Western Sydney Wanderers and American W-League team Pali Blues. She played American collegiate soccer for the Florida State Seminoles and Colorado Buffaloes.

== Early life ==
Hogg was born in Canberra, Australia on 9 December 1993 to Steve and Andrea Hogg. Her father played for the Socceroos. Hogg graduated from Merici College in 2011 and has a Bachelor of Mechanical Engineering from University of Colorado Boulder.

Hogg played as a junior for local club Majura FC. In 2006 she was selected for the Chelsea U-14 Centre of Excellence team and played with the English team until 2008.

== Club career ==
=== Canberra United, 2009–2011 ===
In August 2009, Hogg joined W-League team Canberra United. On 4 October 2009, Hogg made her debut for Canberra United against Brisbane Roar, starting instead of Sally Shipard whose international clearance didn't arrive. In her debut season, Hogg appeared in every match and won the Rising Star award.

=== Pali Blues, 2012 ===
During the 2012 season, Hogg played in 10 games for the Pali Blues of the USL W-League, reaching the semi-finals of the play-offs.

=== College career ===
==== Florida State Seminoles, 2012–2013 ====
On 28 December 2011, before the end of the 2011–12 W-League season, Hogg left Canberra United to take up a four-year athletic scholarship with Florida State University. During her studies, she played for Florida State Seminoles. In her first season she appeared 10 times for Florida State, starting twice. Her first appearance was at home against Florida Gators and her first start was against College of Charleston Cougars. In her second season she played in 8 games for Florida State.

==== Colorado Buffaloes, 2014–2016 ====
In January 2014, Hogg transferred from Florida State University to University of Colorado Boulder, and started playing for the Colorado Buffaloes. In her debut season, she played 22 matches, starting 21 of them, and scored 4 goals. Her first goal for Colorado Buffaloes was scored against UNLV Rebels in a 3–0 victory. On 12 October 2014, Hogg scored twice in the final 15 minutes of Colorado Buffaloes match against Oregon Ducks to record a comeback 2–1 victory. For her performance, she was awarded the CU Athlete of the Week.

In 2015, playing as a central defender, Hogg captained Colorado Buffaloes for 6 matches in which they recorded an 11–4 goal tally and had 3 shut-outs. On 6 October she suffered a season-ending knee injury when playing against Oregon Ducks. Despite missing most of the season, Hogg was selected for the Pac-12 All-Academic second-team with a 3.78 GPA.

In 2016, playing as a left-back, Hogg played 16 matches, of which she started 13, despite battling a leg injury in the second half of the season. As captain, Hogg led Colorado Buffaloes to the NCAA Tournament and a second-place finish in Pac-12. For the second consecutive year Hogg was selected for the Pac-12 All-Academic second-team, carrying a 3.81 GPA. In December, Hogg graduated from the university, and planned to return to Australia to play soccer professionally.

=== Return to Canberra United, 2017 ===
After completing her collegiate studies in the United States, Hogg returned to Australia and signed with Canberra United, on 5 January 2017, for the remainder of the 2016–17 W-League season. She made two appearances for the club. Canberra United finished the regular season in first place with a 7–3–2 record and advanced to the semi-finals where they were eliminated by eventual Grand Final winners Melbourne City in extra time.

=== Western Sydney Wanderers, 2017–2018 ===
On 28 September 2017, Hogg joined Western Sydney Wanderers for the 2017–18 W-League season. She made 11 appearances for the Wanderers.

=== Adelaide United, 2018–2021 ===
Hogg signed with Adelaide United for the 2018–19 W-League season. After one season at Adelaide, Hogg was appointed vice-captain along with Laura Johns under captain Amber Brooks. In December 2020, Hogg re-signed with Adelaide United for the 2020–21 W-League season. Hogg departed Adelaide United ahead of the 2021–22 A-League Women season.

== International ==
Hogg represented Australia as a member of the under-17 and under-20 international youth squads.
