= Ivan Karlović (soccer) =

Australian football player and coach

Ivan Karlović is an Australian former soccer player and coach, who is the Head of Women's Football at Adelaide United (who play in the W-league).

== Playing career ==
A defender, Karlović played at a number of clubs. He made his senior debut at the Raiders in 1999, and played 34 matches for them.

At 18 years of age he moved to the national league, where he played three years with Adelaide City and one with Sydney Olympic.

He then moved to North Eastern MetroStars in 2004 and captained the club from 2006–2010. He was also the club champion twice and won numerous championships during his time at the club. He retired in 2011 after a persistent knee injury.

== Coaching career ==
Following retirement, Karlović was appointed the coach of the MetroStars, who won the 2014 NPL SA Premiership and subsequently the 2014 National Premier Leagues Champions.

He then took a role at Adelaide United as an assistant coach and working with their youth teams.

Prior to the 2017–18 W-league season, Karlović was named as the head coach of Adelaide United's W-League team. In August 2020 Karlović stepped down as coach to take up the role of head of women's football at Adelaide United. He was replaced as coach by his deputy Adrian Stenta.
