= Mallory Weber =

American soccer player (born 1994)

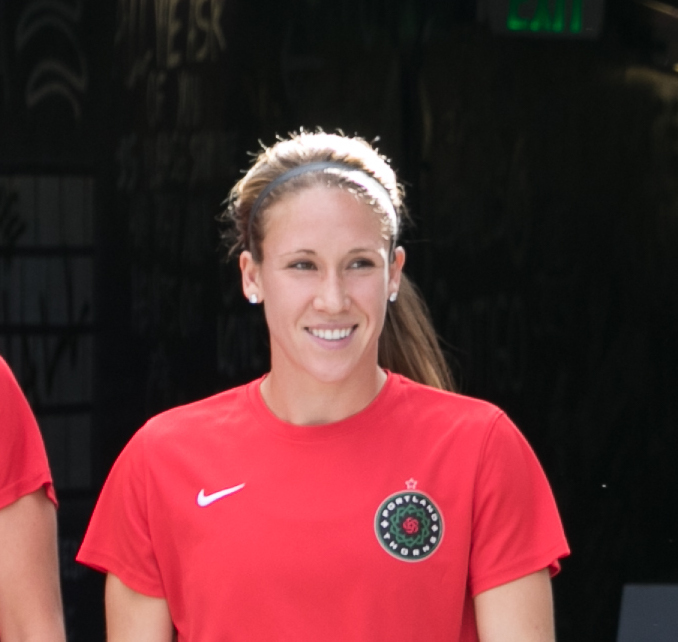

Personal information
- Full name: Mallory Alyse Weber
- Date of birth: April 4, 1994 (age 32)
- Place of birth: Novi, Michigan, United States
- Height: 5 ft 6 in (1.68 m)
- Positions: Forward; fullback

Team information
- Current team: Kansas City Current II (assistant coach)

College career
Years	Team	Apps	(Gls)
2012–2015	Penn State Nittany Lions	100	(36)

Senior career*
Years	Team	Apps	(Gls)
2016–2019	Portland Thorns	44	(1)
2019–2020	Utah Royals	22	(0)
2019–2021	→ Adelaide United (loan)	20	(6)
2021–2024	Kansas City Current	19	(0)

International career
2013–2014	United States U20		
2016	United States U23		

Managerial career
- 2025–: Kansas City Current II (assistant)
- * Club domestic league appearances and goals

Mallory Alyse Weber (born April 4, 1994) is an American soccer coach and former professional player who is an assistant coach for the Kansas City Current II. She played college soccer for the Penn State Nittany Lions, winning the 2015 national championship, and was drafted by the Portland Thorns in the second round of the 2016 NWSL College Draft. She also played for the Utah Royals and the Kansas City Current.

== Playing career ==
=== Portland Thorns FC, 2016–2019 ===
Weber was drafted by Western New York Flash in the 2nd round of the 2016 NWSL College Draft. In March 2016, she was traded to Portland Thorns FC. Weber appeared in 13 games for Portland in 2016.

She returned to the Thorns for the 2017 NWSL season where she made a career high 17 appearances and scored 1 goal as the Thorns won the 2017 NWSL Championship. Weber re-signed with Portland ahead of the 2018 NWSL season. She made 14 appearances for the Thorns in 2018.

Weber appeared in one match for the Thorns in 2019 before she was waived by the team on May 8.

=== Utah Royals FC, 2019–2020 ===
On May 13, 2019, Utah Royals FC acquired Weber off the NWSL waiver wire. She made her debut for the Royals on May 19 against the North Carolina Courage.

=== Kansas City Current, 2021–2024 ===
Appeared in 19 games (14 starts) during the 2021 regular season but suffered a torn ACL just 19 minutes into the 2022 regular season. After her recovery, she re-tore her ACL in her first game back in 2023. She made efforts to rehab her knee over the next two years before announcing her retirement in October 2025.

== Coaching career ==
Weber became an assistant coach for the Kansas City Current II development team in 2025.

== Honors ==
Penn State Nittany Lions

- NCAA Division I Women's Soccer Championship: 2015

Portland Thorns FC

- NWSL Champions: 2017
- NWSL Shield: 2016

Kansas City Current

- NWSL x Liga MX Femenil Summer Cup: 2024
