= Matilda McNamara =

Australian soccer player

Personal information
- Full name: Matilda McNamara
- Date of birth: 18 December 1998 (age 27)
- Place of birth: Australia
- Position: Defender

Team information
- Current team: Racing Power

Senior career*
Years	Team	Apps	(Gls)
2015–2022	Adelaide United	33	(3)
2022–2024	AGF	14	(1)
2024–2026	Adelaide United	44	(2)
2026–	Racing Power	0	(0)

International career^{‡}
2022	Australia U23	4	(1)
2022–	Australia	1	(0)
- * Club domestic league appearances and goals as of 16 July 2026 ‡ National team caps and goals as of 17 December 2024

Matilda McNamara (/ˌmæk.nəˈmɑːr.ə/ MAK-nə-MAHR-ə; born 18 December 1998) is an Australian soccer player who plays as a centre-back for Campeonato Nacional Feminino (Liga BPI) club Racing Power and for the Australia national team. She previously played for A-League Women club Adelaide United and Kvindeliga club AGF.

== Club career ==
=== Adelaide United ===
McNamara made her senior debut for Adelaide United on the 19 December 2015 in a 5–1 win against Newcastle Jets.

=== AGF ===
In July 2022, McNamara left Australia to join Danish club AGF.

=== Return to Adelaide United ===
After two years in Denmark, McNamara returned to Adelaide United in August 2024. In July 2026, McNamara departed Adelaide United to pursue an opportunity in Europe, with the club receiving an undisclosed transfer fee.

=== Racing Power ===
Ahead of the 2026–27 season, McNamara signed for Campeonato Nacional Feminino (Liga BPI) club Racing Power.

== International career ==
In June 2022, after an impressive season with Adelaide United, McNamara was called up to Australia's senior national team for their friendlies against Spain and Portugal. She made her debut on 15 November 2022 in a friendly against Thailand.
