= Grace Abbey =

English-born Australian soccer player (born 1999)

Personal information
- Full name: Grace Abbey
- Date of birth: 22 January 1999 (age 27)
- Place of birth: Oxford, England
- Position: Defender

Senior career*
Years	Team	Apps	(Gls)
2015–2018	Adelaide United	17	(0)
2018–2024	Adelaide City		

International career
	Australia U20	8	(7)
- * Club domestic league appearances and goals as of 19 February 2018

Grace Abbey (born 21 January 1999) is a former professional footballer who played as a defender. Born in England, she played internationally for Australia.

== Club career ==
In 2016, Abbey signed a new deal with Adelaide United. In 2018, Abbey was playing for Adelaide City. She left the club in October 2024.

== International career ==
Born in Oxford, she earned her first call-up to the Australian youth teams in 2016.
