= Ciara Fowler =

Australian soccer player (born 2001)

Personal information
- Full name: Ciara Fowler
- Date of birth: 16 July 2001 (age 25)
- Place of birth: Dublin, Ireland
- Height: 1.62 m (5 ft 4 in)
- Position: Midfielder

Youth career
- Saints FC

Senior career*
Years	Team	Apps	(Gls)
2019–2020	Adelaide United	8	(0)

International career
2018	Ireland U-17	1	(1)
2019–	Ireland U-19	2	(0)
2019	Australia U-20	1	(0)
- * Club domestic league appearances and goals

Ciara Fowler (born 16 July 2001) is an Irish-Australian former soccer player, who last played for Adelaide United in the Australian W-League in from 2019 to 2020.

== Club career ==
Fowler made her debut for Adelaide United on 14 November 2019 during a match against Western Sydney Wanderers.

== International career ==
Fowler represented Ireland on youth national teams in 2018–19. In 2019, she was named to the Australia under-20 national team squad for the 2019 AFC U-19 Women's Championship in Thailand, the qualifier tournament for the 2020 FIFA U-20 Women's World Cup. She made her debut for the Young Matildas during a 5–1 loss against North Korea.

== Personal life ==
Fowler's father is Irish and her mother is from Papua New Guinea. She was raised in a family of talented soccer players, with her brother, Caoimhin (Quivi) and sister, Mary both having played for the Irish youth team. Mary currently represents the Australia senior national team, where she is a key player.

Her sister Mary began her professional career together with Ciara, when they were both signed for Adelaide United in the same year. They made their respective debuts for the squad during the same match.
