= Sian Fryer-McLaren =

Australian soccer player

Sian McLaren
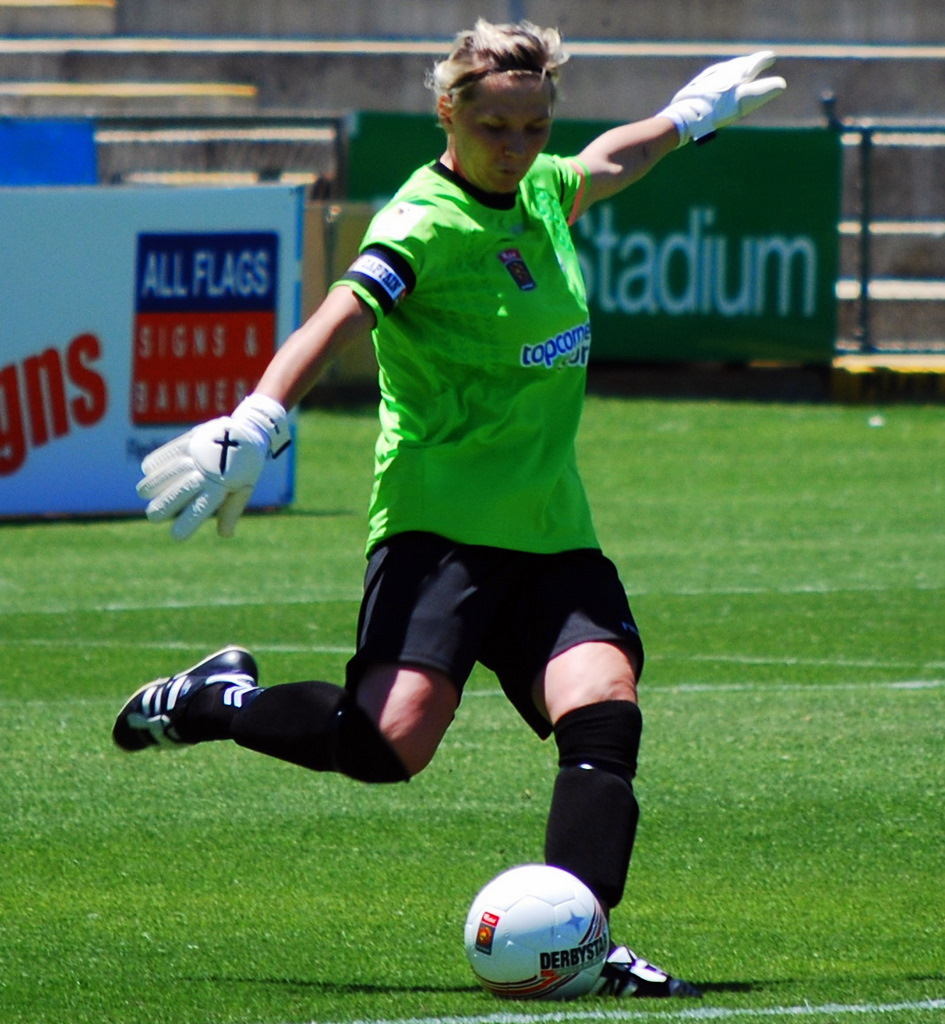

Personal information
- Date of birth: 25 September 1991 (age 35)
- Place of birth: Falkirk, Scotland
- Height: 1.79 m (5 ft 10 in)
- Position: Goalkeeper

Senior career*
| Years | Team | Apps | (Gls) |
- Sturt Marion
| 2008–2012 | Adelaide United | 24 | (0) |
| 2012–2013 | Sydney FC | 8 | (0) |
| 2013–2014 | Sydney Uni SFC | 30 | (0) |
| 2014–2015 | Sydney FC | 3 | (0) |
| 2018–2021 | Adelaide United | 10 | (0) |
- * Club domestic league appearances and goals as of 12 November 2018

Sian McLaren (born 25 September 1991) is an Australian soccer player who played for Adelaide United and for Sydney FC in the Australian W-League and for Sydney Uni SFC in the Australian Women's Premier League.

== Early life ==
Born in Scotland, Fryer-McLaren's family moved to Australia when she was five years old. Her family all supported Rangers.

== Playing career ==
Initially playing as a striker, she switched to playing as a goalkeeper during the under-14 national championships, when her state's team did not have an available goalkeeper. While playing at Sturt-Marion, Fryer-McLaren was backup goalkeeper for Leanne Trimboli.

Fryer-McLaren departed Adelaide United ahead of the 2021–22 A-League Women season.
