= Emma Checker =

Australian soccer player

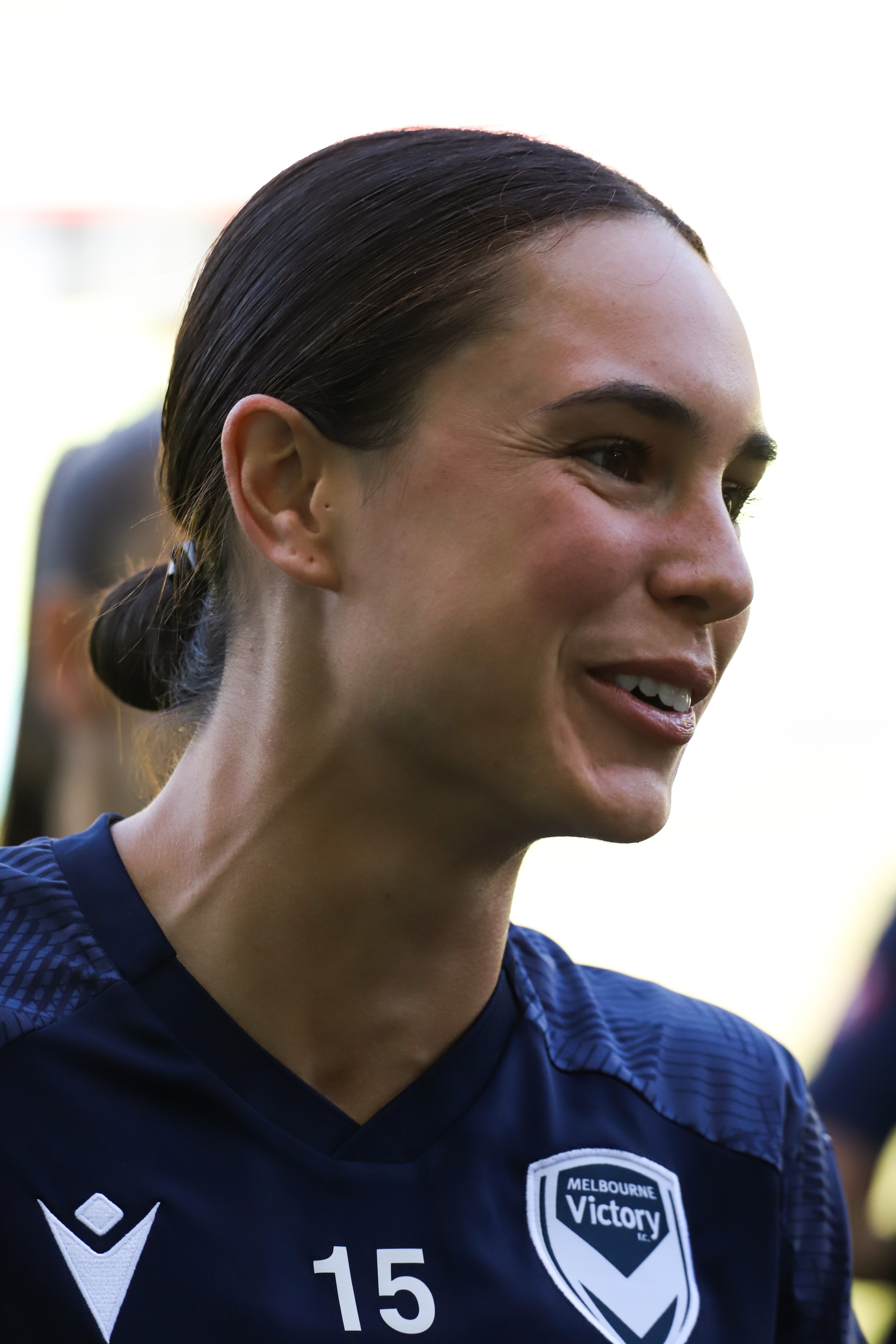
- Emma Checker before a match for Melbourne Victory, December 2023

Personal information
- Full name: Emma Kay Checker
- Date of birth: 11 March 1996 (age 30)
- Place of birth: Ashford, Australia
- Position: Centre back

Team information
- Current team: Melbourne Victory
- Number: 15

Senior career*
Years	Team	Apps	(Gls)
2011–2013	Adelaide United	17	(0)
2013–2015	Melbourne Victory	22	(1)
2015–2017	Canberra United	15	(0)
2017	Hyundai Steel Red Angels	3	(0)
2017–2019	Adelaide United	24	(0)
2019–2023	Melbourne City	39	(2)
2020	FC Fleury 91	1	(0)
2021	Selfoss	18	(0)
2022	→ Umeå (loan)	6	(0)
2023–2024	Melbourne Victory	17	(2)

International career
- Australia U17
- Australia U20
2012–2021	Australia	7	(0)
- * Club domestic league appearances and goals

Emma Kay Checker (born 11 March 1996) is an Australian former professional soccer player who played as a defender. She represented Australia at under-17, under-20 and senior levels. Checker made her senior international debut for Australia in November 2012 at the age of 16.

== Club career ==
=== Adelaide United ===
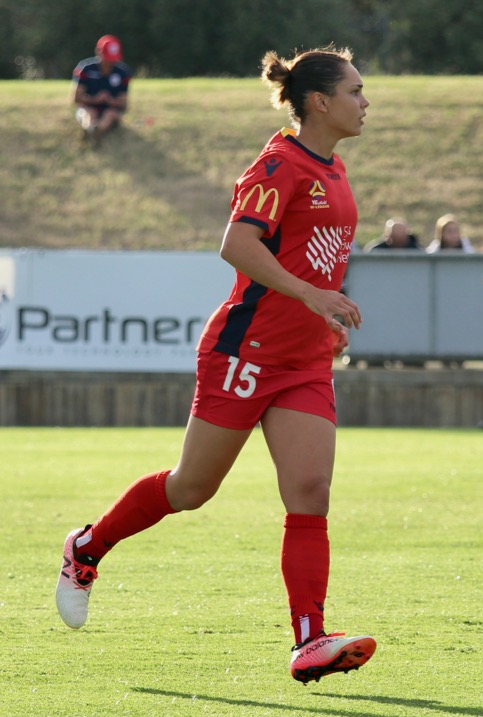
Checker with Adelaide in 2018

Checker made her senior debut for Adelaide United on the opening day of the 2011–12 W-League season, aged 15. She went on to make six further appearances for the club that season, and played in Adelaide's first W-League victory in 34 matches; Checker was one of eight players retained by Adelaide United for the 2012–13 season, and went on to make eleven appearances that season. On 31 May 2013, she became the first female in nearly 20 years to play in an under-18s match with men, when she represented West Torrens Birkalla against White City.

=== Melbourne Victory ===
Prior to the start of the 2013–14 season, Checker switched to Melbourne Victory. She made her debut for the side on 16 November; despite scoring the opening goal of the game after four minutes, she was unable to prevent Melbourne from slipping to a 5–1 defeat against Sydney. She won her first Championship against Brisbane Roar in the 2014 W-League Grand Final.

=== Canberra United ===
In September 2015, Checker joined Canberra United. On 5 January 2016, she suffered an ACL injury and was ruled out for the rest of the season. She returned from injury for the following season on 28 December 2016 against Melbourne Victory and went on to be part of the 2016–17 W-League premiership winning team.

=== Hyundai Steel Red Angels ===
In 2017, during the W-League off-season Checker played with Incheon Hyundai Steel Red Angels in South Korea before a knee injury interrupted her spell.

=== Return to Adelaide United ===
On 22 September 2017, Checker returned to Adelaide United, signing a two-year contract. She made history by becoming the youngest captain of a W-League team during her stint at Adelaide. She went on and reasserted herself as one of the country's strongest and most reliable defenders over the past two seasons. She sits fourth on Adelaide's all-time appearance list with 41 games.

=== Melbourne City ===
On 19 September 2019, Checker signed with Melbourne City ahead of the 2019-20 W-League season. She went on to win both the Premiership and Championship, having made 14 appearances across the campaign and was a key part of a defence that conceded just five goals for the season.

On 22 December 2020, Checker resigned with Melbourne City for the 2020-21 W-League season. She was appointed captain ahead of the upcoming season. After four months on the sideline, she returned from injury in Round 4 against Melbourne Victory. In Round 5, she scored her second ever W-League goal against her former side Adelaide United.

In August 2021, Checker re-signed with Melbourne City for two more years and confirmed she will remain captain.

In August 2023, after four seasons at the club, Checker departed Melbourne City.

==== Off-season at FC Fleury 91 ====
On 15 June 2020, Checker became the latest player to head to Europe, signing with French club FC Fleury 91 on a two-year contract. She made her Division 1 Féminine debut against Issy on 26 September 2020. During her second overseas stint, she suffered a stress fracture in her fibular, cutting short her time in France.

==== Off-season at Selfoss ====
In April 2021, Checker signed with Selfoss of the Icelandic Úrvalsdeild kvenna.

==== Loan to Umeå ====
In August 2022, Checker joined Swedish club Umeå on a short-term loan for three months before the beginning of the 2022–23 A-League Women season.

=== Return to Melbourne Victory ===
In August 2023, Checker returned to Melbourne Victory. Checker retired from professional football at the end of the 2023–24 A-League Women.

== International career ==
Prior to making her Adelaide United debut, Checker made her debut for Australia's under-17 team in a friendly against New Zealand. She was part of her country's unsuccessful attempt to qualify for the 2012 FIFA U-17 Women's World Cup, and her performances earned her a place in Australia's senior training camp in March 2012. Still aged 16, she was selected for a friendly against New Zealand on 24 June 2012, but remained an unused substitute. Instead, she made her senior international debut on 23 November 2012, playing the entire match in a 4–0 victory over Hong Kong.

In September 2019, after an impressive season with Adelaide United, Checker was called up to Australia's senior training camp in preparation for their upcoming friendlies against Chile. In November 2019, she came on as a substitute for both matches against Chile.

== Personal life ==
Checker graduated from Deakin University in 2023 with a Bachelor of Business with distinction, majoring in Public Relations.
