= Chelsie Dawber =

Australian soccer player (born 2000)

Personal information
- Full name: Chelsie Dawber
- Date of birth: 12 January 2000 (age 26)
- Place of birth: Australia
- Position: Forward

Team information
- Current team: Adelaide United
- Number: 10

Youth career
- 2014–2017: SA NTC

Senior career*
Years	Team	Apps	(Gls)
2017–2022	Adelaide United	42	(17)
2018–2020	→ Adelaide City (loan)	46	(76)
2022–2023	Chicago Red Stars	4	(0)
2022–2023	→ Adelaide United (loan)	13	(4)
2023	→ Norrköping (loan)	16	(1)
2023–	Adelaide United	48	(11)

International career
- Australia U17
2022–	Australia U23	3	(2)
- * Club domestic league appearances and goals as of 02:36, 16 May 2026 (UTC)

Chelsie Dawber (born 12 January 2000) is an Australian professional women's football player who plays for Adelaide United in the A-League Women. She has previously played for National Women's Soccer League club Chicago Red Stars and had loan spells at Adelaide City FC and IFK Norrköping.

== Club career ==
In 2016, Dawber suffered a serious head injury while playing indoor soccer. This injury kept her out of the game for one year.

=== Adelaide United ===
In 2017, Dawber joined her first club, Adelaide United in the W-League. She made her debut on 3 November 2017 in a 2–1 loss against Western Sydney Wanderers coming on as a substitute for Emily Condon.

In the 2021/22 season, Dawber had a breakout year for the Reds, scoring 10 goals. This helped place Adelaide into their first ever finals campaign.

Dawber finished sixth in the A-League Women's Julie Dolan Medal, an award given to the best performer throughout the season. She finished on 13 votes, with teammate Fiona Worts collecting the award.

=== Adelaide City ===
In 2020, Dawber scored a record 31 goals in 11 games for Adelaide City in the Women's National Premier League. Her team would go on to win the cup that season, but lose 2–1 to Metro United in the grand final.

In 2021, Dawber won the Women's National Premier League most prestigious award, the Shirley Brown Medal with 23 votes.

=== Chicago Red Stars ===
On 6 April 2022, it was announced Dawber had signed for Chicago Red Stars. In November 2022, Dawber returned to Adelaide United on loan for the 2022–23 A-League Women season. In March 2023, Dawber was recalled early from her loan to be loaned to Swedish club Norrköping for the 2023 Damallsvenskan season. In November 2023, Chicago declined to exercise the option in Dawber's contract.

=== Return to Adelaide United ===
In November 2023, Dawber returned to Adelaide United, signing a contract until the end of the 2023–24 A-League Women season.

== International career ==
=== Australia U17 ===
In 2014, Dawber was selected to represent Australia with the Mini Matildas

=== Australia U23 ===
In July 2022, Dawber was selected to join the Australian U23 team in the Philippines for the AFC tournament.

=== Australia U20 ===
On 16 March 2018, Dawber was selected to join the Young Matildas.

== Club statistics ==
Club	Season	League		Cup		Total	
Club	Season	Apps	Goals	Apps	Goals	Apps	Goals
Adelaide United	2017–18	9	0	–	–	9	0
Career total		9	0	0	0	9	0
