= Laura Johns =

Australian soccer player (born 1994)

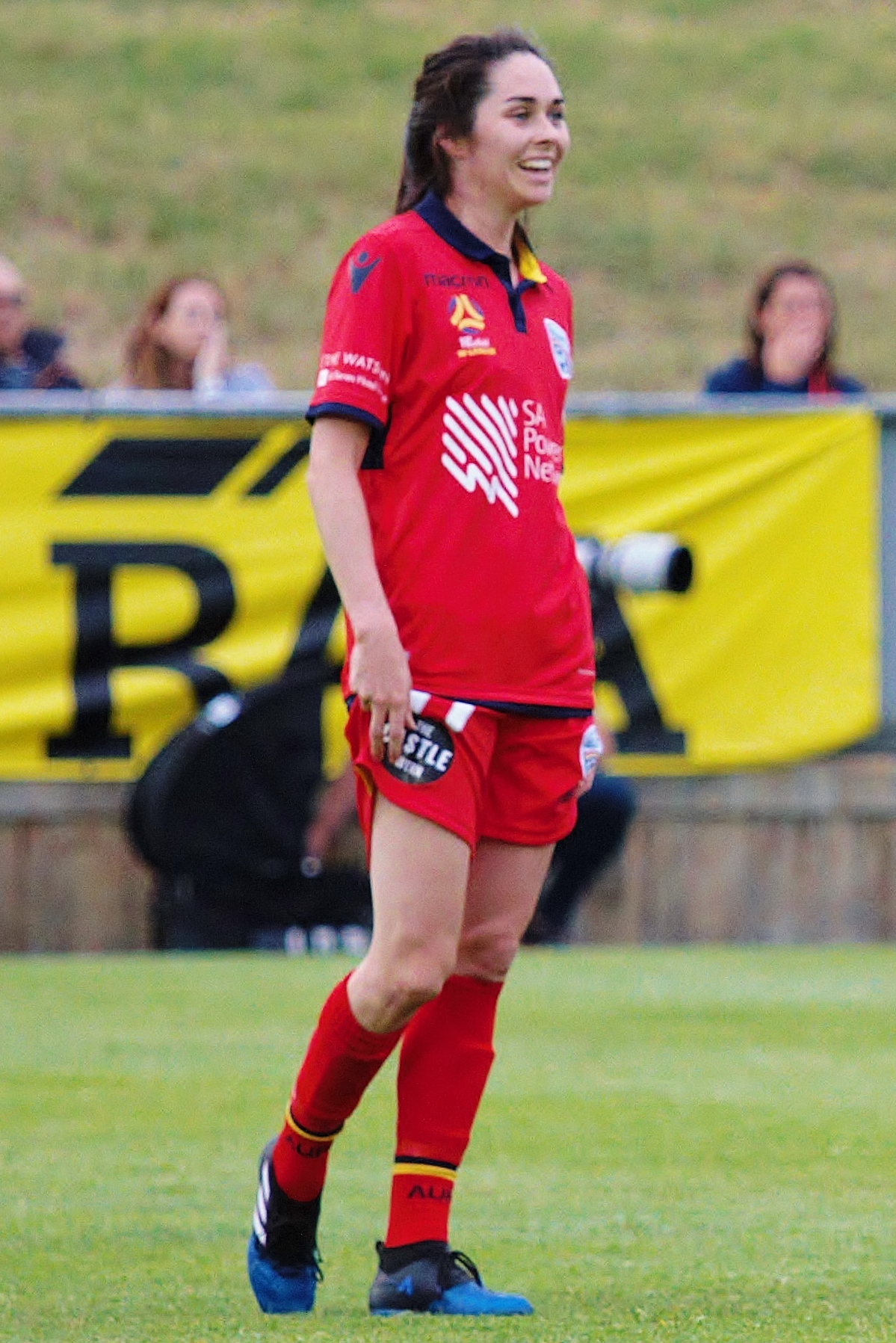

Personal information
- Full name: Laura Kate Johns
- Date of birth: 31 August 1994 (age 32)
- Place of birth: Banksia Park, Australia
- Height: 5 ft 6 in (1.68 m)
- Position: Defender

College career
Years	Team	Apps	(Gls)
2013–2016	UMass Minutewomen	63	(2)

Senior career*
Years	Team	Apps	(Gls)
2012–2013	Adelaide United	7	(0)
2017–2021	Adelaide United	32	(0)
- * Club domestic league appearances and goals as of 2 February 2018

Laura Kate Johns (born 31 August 1994) is an Australian professional soccer player. She currently plays for Adelaide United in the W-League.

== Club career ==
=== Adelaide United ===
==== 2012–13 ====
Johns joined Adelaide United in 2012 and made her Adelaide United debut in a 4–3 win over the Western Sydney Wanderers in the 2012–13 season.

==== 2017–18 ====
On 26 October 2017, Adelaide United signed Johns for the second time in her career. She made her second season debut coming on as a substitute as a right defender for Georgia Campagnale in a 2–1 loss against Newcastle Jets.
