= Isabel Hodgson =

Australian soccer player (born 1996)

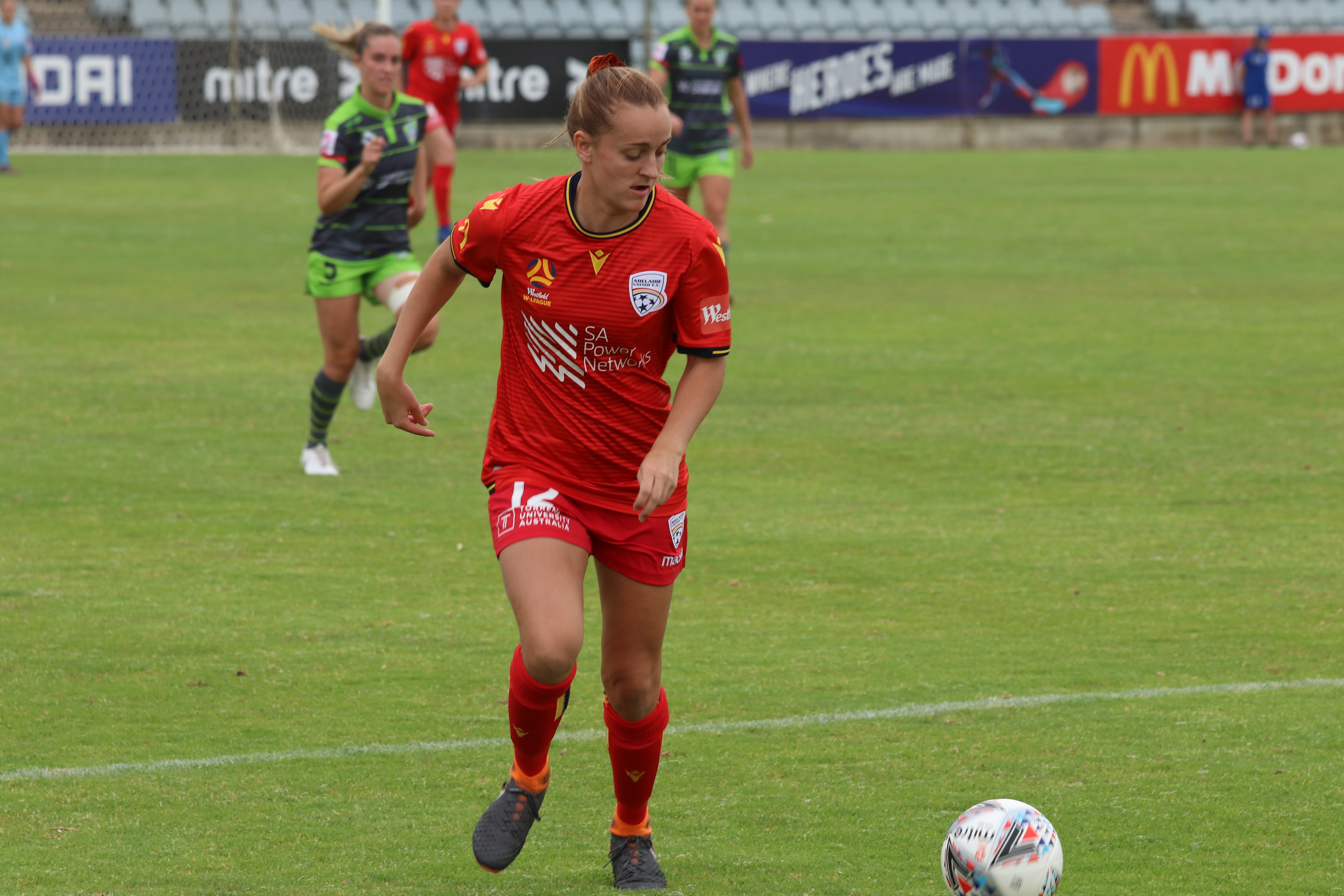
- Hodgson with Adelaide United in 2019

Personal information
- Date of birth: 12 May 1996 (age 30)
- Place of birth: Adelaide, South Australia, Australia
- Height: 1.70 m (5 ft 7 in)
- Positions: Defender; winger

Team information
- Current team: Brisbane Roar
- Number: 5

Youth career
- Fulham United

College career
Years	Team	Apps	(Gls)
2015–2018	ETSU Buccaneers	78	(11)

Senior career*
Years	Team	Apps	(Gls)
2011–2013	Fulham United	51	(45)
2013–2015	Adelaide United	15	(0)
2018	Adelaide City		
2019–2026	Adelaide United	72	(6)
2026–	Brisbane Roar	0	(0)

International career
2014	Australia U19	3	
- * Club domestic league appearances and goals as of 28 May 2024

Isabel Hodgson (born 12 May 1996) is an Australian soccer player, who plays as a defender for A-League Women team Brisbane Roar. She previously played for and captained A-League Women club Adelaide United.

== Youth career ==
Hodgson played for Fulham United for 10 seasons. From 2011, she scored 65 career goals for the club, including 35 goals in her breakout 2013 season.

She represented South Australia on the state soccer team from under-12s to under-15s, and featured in the under-15s national soccer championship in 2011. She was then on the National Training Centre (NTC) South Australia under-18 squad, competing at the NTC nationals in 2012, 2013, and 2014. In 2014, she led the South Australia under-18s as captain, finishing with a 6–0–2 record and the team's first-ever championship.

=== International appearances ===
Hodgson was selected for the under-19 Young Matildas squad and started in two of the three matches she played at the AFC Qualifiers Championship in Hanoi. She was a striker.

== Professional career ==
Hodgson has played for Adelaide United for her entire senior career. She made 15 appearances between 2013 and 2015, before leaving Australia to play in the U.S. Hodgson returned to Adelaide United in 2018, and was named captain in 2021.

Although she now mainly plays in the position of defender, Impetus has described Hodgson as "a skilful and tenacious fullback who is also capable of driving upfield and setting up goals". In the final match of the 2020–21 season, she was moved forward into an attacking role, and scored a goal in front of a crowd of 5,159 at Hindmarsh Stadium.

During her seventh season with Adelaide, Hodgson became only the fifth player in Adelaide United history to reach 50 A-League Women's matches. In 2023, she injured her ankle during the pre-season and missed the first two matches of the season.

In May 2026, after 11 seasons with the club, Hodgson departed Adelaide United.

In August 2026, Hodgson joined fellow A-League Women club Brisbane Roar.

== College career ==
Hodgson played for the East Tennessee State University Buccaneers, an NCAA Division I soccer team in the United States on scholarship, and served as captain for all four years. During her freshman season, she was mainly a defender, occasionally moving to right wing and back to left defense.

While at ETSU, she returned to play for Adelaide United twice "on loan". She was offered a contract with United during her July 2018 summer break, when she was back in Australia playing for Adelaide City in the SA Women's National Premier League.

== Personal life ==
Hodgson juggled her interests in football and musical theatre from a young age, with training and rehearsals often happening on the same day. At the age of six, Hodgson appeared in an Australian theatre production of The Sound of Music, playing Gretl von Trapp. She also starred in the title role in Annie at Annesley College. As a freshman studying theatre in the US, she starred in the role of Maureen Johnson in an ETSU production of Rent.

Hodgson is active on TikTok, offering commentary on women's soccer, guest appearances from teammates, and her own spin on viral trends. She has also spoken openly about her own experience coming as a gay player in her late teens.

In 2022, she was named as an ambassador for Football South Australia FIFA Women's World Cup 2023 Legacy Plan and Committee.
