= Marden Sports Complex =

Stadium in Marden, South Australia

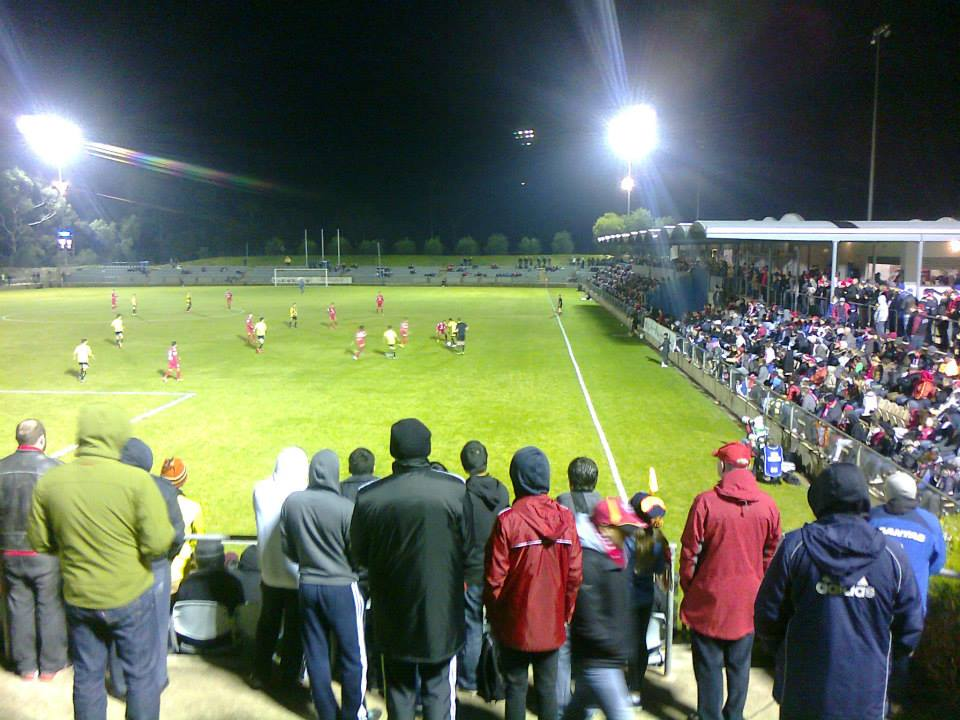
- Interactive map of Marden Sports Complex
- Location: 65 Lower Portrush Road; Marden, South Australia 5070
- Coordinates: 34°53′27″S 138°38′0″E
- Capacity: 6,000
- Surface: Grass

Construction
- Opened: 2000

Tenants
- Adelaide Blue Eagles; Adelaide United Women

Marden Sports Complex is a multi-use stadium in Marden, South Australia. It is mainly used for soccer and is the home ground for National Premier League side Adelaide Blue Eagles. It was also used for the 2004 OFC Nations Cup and the 2006 AFC Women's Asian Cup.

The stadium was built in 2000 and has a capacity of 6,000 people.

It was co-host to the group stage of the 2004 OFC Nations Cup alongside Hindmarsh Stadium, with Marden hosting five games including one Socceroos match, a 6–1 win over Fiji featuring a Tim Cahill hattrick. Two years later the stadium hosted one match of the 2006 AFC Women's Asian Cup, a 5–0 win by the Matildas against Thailand.

It has been used by other Adelaide-based teams for FFA Cup matches, including Adelaide City's famous 1–0 win over A-League side Western Sydney Wanderers. A-League outfit Adelaide United has also hosted FFA Cup matches at the venue including their Round of 32 victory against Wellington Phoenix in 2014, victories against the Newcastle Jets and Melbourne Victory in 2017 and a victory against the Central Coast Mariners in 2018.

Adelaide United's W-League side also plays its home games at the ground.
