= Sarah Langman =

Australian soccer player

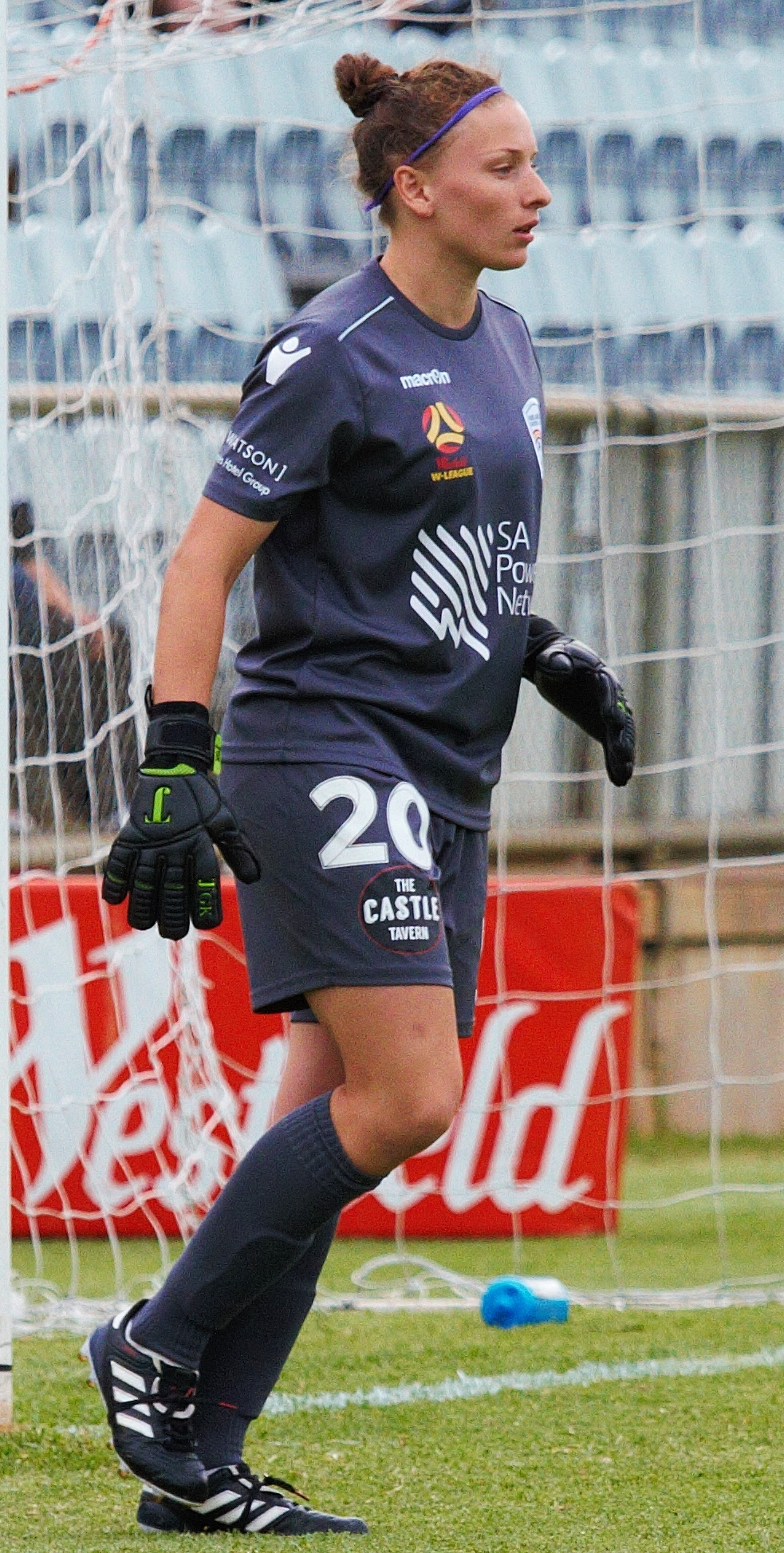

Personal information
- Birth name: Sarah Willacy
- Date of birth: 29 June 1995 (age 31)
- Place of birth: Toorak Gardens, Australia
- Height: 1.59 m (5 ft 3 in)
- Position: Goalkeeper

Team information
- Current team: Western Sydney Wanderers
- Number: 1

Senior career*
Years	Team	Apps	(Gls)
2014–2020	Adelaide United	38	(0)
2020–2022	Western Sydney Wanderers	21	(0)
2022	APIA Leichhardt	14	(0)
2022–2023	Perth Glory	11	(0)
2023–2026	Central Coast Mariners	42	(0)
2026–	Western Sydney Wanderers	0	(0)
- * Club domestic league appearances and goals as of 6 September 2026

Sarah Langman (née Willacy, born 29 June 1995) is an Australian women's professional soccer player who currently plays as a goalkeeper for Western Sydney Wanderers.

== Club career ==
=== Adelaide United ===
In 2014, Langman joined Adelaide United. She made her debut for Adelaide United in a 3–3 draw against Melbourne Victory. In 2018, Langman discussed how people in football had presumed that her height would make it unlikely for her to be a successful goalkeeper. In September 2020, Adelaide United announced that Langman would not re-sign for the 2020–21 W-League season.

=== Western Sydney Wanderers ===
A few weeks after announcing that she wouldn't re-sign with Adelaide United, Langman joined W-League club, Western Sydney Wanderers.

=== Perth Glory ===
In July 2022, Langman joined Perth Glory on a one-year contract.

=== Central Coast Mariners ===
In August 2023, Langman joined Central Coast Mariners.

=== Return to Western Sydney Wanderers ===
In August 2026, Langman returned to Western Sydney Wanderers.

== Club statistics ==
Club	Season	League		Cup		Total	
Club	Season	Apps	Goals	Apps	Goals	Apps	Goals
Adelaide United	2014–15	0	0	–	–	0	0
Adelaide United	2016–17	6	0	–	–	5	0
Adelaide United	2017–18	9	0	–	–	9	0
