= Emily Hodgson =

Australian soccer player

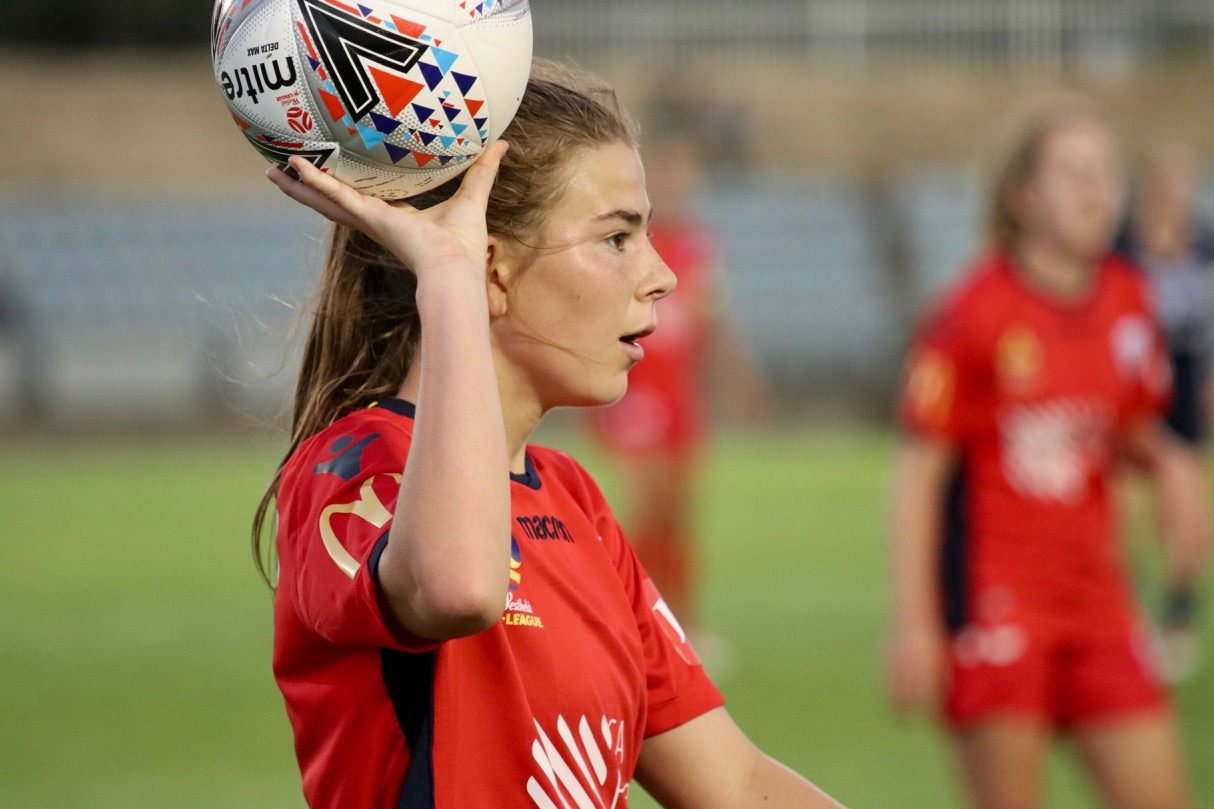
- Hodgson in 2018

Personal information
- Full name: Emily Grace Hodgson
- Date of birth: 1 July 2000 (age 26)
- Place of birth: Australia
- Height: 1.62 m (5 ft 4 in)
- Position: Right full-back

Team information
- Current team: Adelaide United
- Number: 2

Senior career*
Years	Team	Apps	(Gls)
2016–	Adelaide United	103	(1)

International career^{‡}
2018–	Australia U-20	7	(0)
- * Club domestic league appearances and goals as of 28 May 2024 ‡ National team caps and goals as of 1 May 2019

Emily Grace Hodgson (born 1 July 2000) is an Australian professional soccer player. She currently plays for Adelaide United in the W-League.

== Club career ==
=== Adelaide United, 2016– ===
On 3 November 2016, Hodgson became part of the Adelaide United women's squad. She made her debut in a 3–3 draw against Melbourne Victory in the 2016–17 season of Round 1.

== Early life ==
Hodgson attended Torrens Valley Christian School throughout her high school years (grade 8–12) and graduated in 2018. Her studies were often interrupted through travel across Australia and the world for her soccer career.
