= Emily Condon =

Australian football player (born 1998)

Personal information
- Full name: Emily Rose Condon
- Date of birth: 1 September 1998 (age 28)
- Place of birth: Port Pirie, Australia
- Height: 1.66 m (5 ft 5 1/2 in)
- Position: Midfielder

Team information
- Current team: Canberra United
- Number: 10

Youth career
- Northern Demons

Senior career*
Years	Team	Apps	(Gls)
2013–2026	Adelaide United	148	(23)
2026–	Canberra United	0	(0)

International career^{‡}
2014–	Australia U-20	15	(8)
2018–	Australia	1	(0)
- * Club domestic league appearances and goals as of 28 May 2024 ‡ National team caps and goals as of 9 July 2018

Emily Rose Condon (born 1 September 1998) is an Australian soccer player who plays for Canberra United in the Australian A-League Women. She became the first women's player to achieve 100 appearances for Adelaide United in March 2024.

== Club career ==
Condon made her debut for Adelaide United on 5 January 2014, in the team's 2–0 victory over Canberra United. Upon her substitution onto the pitch in the 59th minute, she became the youngest woman to play for Adelaide United.

In the subsequent match, on 11 January 2014, Condon scored her first goal in the 76th minute of a 1–1 draw with Western Sydney Wanderers.

In September 2026, Condon departed Adelaide United as the second on the club's all-time appearance list following 148 games. She joined fellow A-League Women club Canberra United.
