= Georgia Campagnale =

Australian soccer player

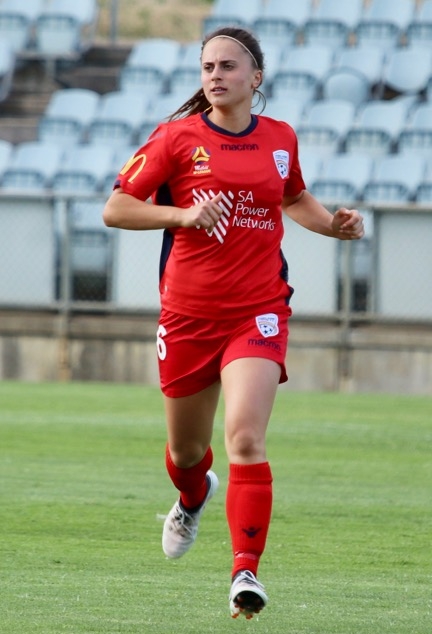

Personal information
- Date of birth: 9 December 1996 (age 29)
- Place of birth: Australia
- Position: Midfielder

Senior career*
Years	Team	Apps	(Gls)
2014–2021	Adelaide United	72	(1)
- * Club domestic league appearances and goals as of 21 March 2021

Georgia Campagnale (born 9 December 1996) is an Australian professional soccer midfielder who played for Adelaide United in the W-League Campagnale was the winner of the 2021 Client of the Year at The Fit Space alongside her older brother Sam.

== Club career ==
=== Adelaide United ===
Campagnale started her Adelaide United career in 2014. She made her debut in a 2–0 loss to Sydney FC. On 1 December 2018, Campagnale scored her first goal for Adelaide United with a 97th minute last-gasp equaliser against Melbourne City FC. She had her contract renewed with the club in September 2019. Campagnale held the record for the most games for Adelaide United women's team of all time. Campagnale departed Adelaide United ahead of the 2021–22 A-League Women season.

== Personal life ==
Campagnale is studying for a master's degree in Nutrition and Dietetics. She is of Italian descent.
