= 2017–18 Newcastle Jets FC (women) season =

Newcastle Jets W-League
2017–18 season
- Manager: Craig Deans
- Stadium: McDonald Jones Stadium
- W-League: 3rd
- Top goalscorer: League: Katie Stengel (10 goals); All: Katie Stengel (10 goals)
- Highest home attendance: 4,168 vs. Western Sydney Wanderers; 29 October 2017
- Lowest home attendance: 1,030 vs. Canberra United; 19 November 2017
- Average home league attendance: 2,971
Home colours	Away colours

The 2017–18 Newcastle Jets W-League season was their tenth season in the W-League, the premier competition for women's soccer in Australia. The team played home games at McDonald Jones Stadium and the club was managed by Craig Deans.

== Players ==
=== Current squad ===
Note: Flags indicate national team as defined under FIFA eligibility rules; some limited exceptions apply. Players may hold more than one non-FIFA nationality.

No.	Pos.	Nation	Player
2	DF	AUS	Hannah Brewer
3	DF	AUS	Tash Prior
5	DF	USA	Arin Gilliland (on loan from Chicago Red Stars)
6	FW	AUS	Cassidy Davis
7	MF	AUS	Gema Simon
8	DF	AUS	Sophie Nenadovic
9	FW	USA	Katie Stengel (on loan from Boston Breakers)
10	MF	AUS	Emily van Egmond (Captain)
11	FW	AUS	Cortnee Vine
12	FW	AUS	Tara Andrews

No.	Pos.	Nation	Player
14	FW	AUS	Tara Pender
16	DF	AUS	Nikola Orgill
17	FW	AUS	Jenna Kingsley
18	DF	AUS	Clare Wheeler
19	MF	AUS	Ashlee Brodigan
20	GK	AUS	Claire Coelho
21	MF	AUS	Pana Petratos
23	MF	USA	Tori Huster (on loan from Washington Spirit)
28	GK	USA	Britt Eckerstrom (on loan from Portland Thorns FC)

=== Transfers in ===
No.	Pos.	Nat.	Name	Age	Moving from	Type	Transfer window	Ends	Transfer fee	Source
2	DF	(Australia)	Hannah Brewer	24	Canberra United	Transfer	Pre-season		Free	
16	DF	(Australia)	Nikola Orgill	24	Western Sydney Wanderers	Transfer	Pre-season		Free	
3	DF	(Australia)	Tash Prior	19	Unattached	Transfer	Pre-season		Free	
9	FW	(United States)	Katie Stengel	25	(United States) Boston Breakers	Loan	Pre-season		Free	
10	MF	(Australia)	Emily van Egmond	24	Unattached	Transfer	Pre-season		Free	
28	GK	(United States)	Britt Eckerstrom	24	(United States) Portland Thorns FC	Loan	Pre-season		Free	
23	MF	(United States)	Tori Huster	28	(United States) Washington Spirit	Loan	Pre-season		Free	
11	FW	(Australia)	Cortnee Vine	19	Brisbane Roar	Transfer	Pre-season		Free	
20	GK	(Australia)	Claire Coelho	21	Sydney FC	Transfer	Pre-season		Free	

=== Transfers out ===
No.	Pos.	Nat.	Name	Age	Moving to	Type	Transfer window	Transfer fee	Source
9	FW	(United States)	Jen Hoy	26	(United States) Chicago Red Stars	Loan return	Pre-season	Free	
	FW	(Australia)	Grace McIntyre	21	Canberra United	Transfer	Pre-season	Free	
	DF	(United States)	Megan Oyster	25	(United States) Boston Breakers	Loan return	Pre-season	Free	
	FW	(Australia)	Rhali Dobson	25	Melbourne City	Transfer	Pre-season	Free	
		(Australia)	Liana Danaskos	22	Canberra United	Transfer	Pre-season	Free	
	MF	(Australia)	Chloe Logarzo	22	Sydney FC	Transfer	Pre-season	Free	

=== Contract extensions ===
No.	Name	Position	Duration	Date	Notes

== Managerial staff ==
As of July 2015, the managerial staff for the Newcastle Jets FC consists of:

Position	Name
Head coach	(Australia) Craig Deans
Assistant coach	(Australia) Ashley Wilson
Goalkeeper coach	(Australia) Chris Bowling

== Squad statistics ==
N	Pos.	Nat.	Name	Total					W-League					W-League Finals Series
N	Pos.	Nat.	Name	Apps	Goals	Yellow card	Second yellow card	Red card	Apps	Goals	Yellow card	Second yellow card	Red card	Apps	Goals	Yellow card	Second yellow card	Red card
2	DF	(Australia)	Hannah Brewer	13	1	3	0	1	12+0	1	3	0	0	1+0	0	0	0	1
3	DF	(Australia)	Tash Prior	11	0	4	0	0	9+1	0	3	0	0	1+0	0	1	0	0
5	DF	(United States)	Arin Gilliland	13	6	0	0	0	12+0	5	0	0	0	1+0	1	0	0	0
6	MF	(Australia)	Cassidy Davis	13	0	1	0	0	12+0	0	1	0	0	1+0	0	0	0	0
7	MF	(Australia)	Gema Simon	6	1	0	0	0	2+3	1	0	0	0	1+0	0	0	0	0
8	DF	(Australia)	Sophie Nenadovic	9	0	1	0	0	4+5	0	1	0	0	0+0	0	0	0	0
9	FW	(United States)	Katie Stengel	13	10	0	0	0	12+0	10	0	0	0	1+0	0	0	0	0
10	DF	(Australia)	Emily van Egmond	12	4	1	0	0	11+0	4	1	0	0	1+0	0	0	0	0
11	FW	(Australia)	Cortnee Vine	11	0	1	0	0	3+7	0	1	0	0	0+1	0	0	0	0
12	FW	(Australia)	Tara Andrews	6	1	0	0	0	0+5	0	0	0	0	0+1	1	0	0	0
14	FW	(Australia)	Tara Pender	2	0	0	0	0	0+2	0	0	0	0	0+0	0	0	0	0
16	DF	(Australia)	Nikola Orgill	11	1	0	0	0	9+1	1	0	0	0	0+1	0	0	0	0
17	MF	(Australia)	Jenna Kingsley	13	1	0	0	0	12+0	1	0	0	0	1+0	0	0	0	0
18	DF	(Australia)	Clare Wheeler	11	0	2	0	0	9+1	0	1	0	0	1+0	0	1	0	0
19	FW	(Australia)	Ashlee Brodigan	4	0	0	0	0	2+2	0	0	0	0	0+0	0	0	0	0
20	GK	(Australia)	Claire Coelho	0	0	0	0	0	0+0	0	0	0	0	0+0	0	0	0	0
21	MF	(Australia)	Pana Petratos	7	0	0	0	0	0+7	0	0	0	0	0+0	0	0	0	0
23	MF	(United States)	Tori Huster	12	2	2	0	0	11+0	2	2	0	0	1+0	0	0	0	0
28	GK	(United States)	Britt Eckerstrom	13	0	0	0	0	12+0	0	0	0	0	1+0	0	0	0	0

- Last updated: 10 February 2018
- Source: au.women.soccerway.com
- (yellow card) = Number of bookings; (second yellow card) = Number of sending offs after a second yellow card; (red card) = Number of sending offs by a direct red card.

== Competitions ==
=== W-League ===
==== League table ====
Pos	Team	Pld	W	D	L	GF	GA	GD	Pts	Qualification
1	Brisbane Roar	12	9	1	2	21	12	+9	28	Qualification to Finals series
2	Sydney FC	12	8	1	3	26	16	+10	25	Qualification to Finals series
3	Newcastle Jets	12	6	2	4	26	21	+5	20	Qualification to Finals series
4	Melbourne City (C)	12	6	2	4	20	15	+5	20	Qualification to Finals series
5	Canberra United	12	5	1	6	24	27	−3	16	
6	Perth Glory	12	4	2	6	25	27	−2	14	
7	Melbourne Victory	12	3	2	7	15	19	−4	11	
8	Western Sydney Wanderers	12	3	2	7	13	21	−8	11	
9	Adelaide United	12	3	1	8	15	27	−12	10	

Source: A-Leagues
Rules for classification: 1) points; 2) goal difference; 3) number of goals scored.
(C) Champions

==== Results summary ====
Overall								Home						Away					
Pld	W	D	L	GF	GA	GD	Pts	W	D	L	GF	GA	GD	W	D	L	GF	GA	GD
12	6	2	4	26	21	+5	20	2	1	3	9	11	−2	4	1	1	17	10	+7

Last updated: 3 February 2018.
Source: Competitive Matches

==== Results by round ====
Round	1	2	3	4	5	6	7	8	9	10	11	12	13	14
Ground	H	H	A	H	A	B	A	H	A	A	H	B	A	H
Result	W	W	L	L	W	✖	W	D	W	D	L	✖	W	L
Position	3	2	3	5	4	4	2	3	2	2	3	3	3	3

Updated to match(es) played on 4 February 2018. Source: Competitive Matches
A = Away; H = Home; B = Bye; W = Win; D = Draw; L = Loss

==== Matches ====
Win Draw Loss

29 October 2017 1	Newcastle Jets	2–1	Western Sydney Wanderers	Newcastle
14:30 AEDT	Stengel 14'; Kingsley 78'	Report	Halloway 77'	Stadium: McDonald Jones Stadium; Attendance: 4,168; Referee: Lara Lee

4 November 2017 2	Newcastle Jets	2–0	Sydney FC	Newcastle
17:00 AEDT	Orgill 2'; Gilliland 29'	Report		Stadium: McDonald Jones Stadium; Attendance: 2,303; Referee: Kelly Jones

12 November 2017 3	Melbourne City	5–2	Newcastle Jets	Melbourne
16:30 AEDT	Simon 5'; Crummer 45', 71'; Fishlock 54', 77'	Report	Stengel 16', 20'	Stadium: AAMI Park; Attendance: 1,773; Referee: Rebecca Durcau

19 November 2017 4	Newcastle Jets	1–2	Canberra United	Newcastle
16:30 AEDT	van Egmond 8' (pen.)	Report	Sykes 48'; Pressley 65'	Stadium: No. 2 Sportsground; Attendance: 1,030; Referee: Maddison Kennedy

25 November 2017 5	Adelaide United	1–2	Newcastle Jets	Adelaide
19:00 AEDT	Naughton 51'	Report	Stengel 32'; Huster 49'	Stadium: Marden Sports Complex; Attendance: 835; Referee: Kelly Jones

10 December 2017 7	Brisbane Roar	0–3	Newcastle Jets	Brisbane
17:30 AEST		Report	Gilliland 15', 31', 40'	Stadium: A.J. Kelly Park; Attendance: 1,288; Referee: Casey Reibelt

16 December 2017 8	Newcastle Jets	3–3	Perth Glory	Newcastle
20:15 AEDT	Gilliland 31'; Stengel 83'; S. Carroll 90+4' (o.g.)	Report	Kerr 77', 82', 84'	Stadium: McDonald Jones Stadium; Attendance: 3,210; Referee: Maddison Kennedy

29 December 2017 9	Melbourne Victory	1–3	Newcastle Jets	Melbourne
17:20 AEDT	Cooney-Cross 28'	Report	Huster 5'; Stengel 41' (pen.); Brewer 72'	Stadium: AAMI Park; Attendance: 5,533; Referee: Kelly Jones

3 January 2018 10	Sydney FC	2–2	Newcastle Jets	Sydney
17:20 AEDT	Ledbrook 20'; Ibini 27'	Report	van Egmond 35' (pen.); G. Simon 89'	Stadium: Allianz Stadium; Attendance: 4,229; Referee: Lara Lee

12 January 2018 11	Newcastle Jets	1–2	Adelaide United	Newcastle
17:20 AEDT	Stengel 28'	Report	Colaprico 21'; Naughton 43'	Stadium: McDonald Jones Stadium; Attendance: 4,112; Referee: Rebecca Durcau

28 January 2018 13	Canberra United	1–5	Newcastle Jets	Canberra
16:30 AEDT	Carpenter 42'	Report	van Egmond 13', 66'; Stengel 23', 82', 90'	Stadium: McKellar Park; Attendance: 1,117; Referee: Rebecca Durcau

3 February 2018 14	Newcastle Jets	0–3	Melbourne City	Newcastle
20:15 AEDT		Report	Taylor 29'; Luik 33'; Kinga 46'	Stadium: McDonald Jones Stadium; Attendance: 3,000; Referee: Kate Jacewicz

==== Finals series ====
10 February 2018 Semi-final	Sydney FC	3–2 (a.e.t.)	Newcastle Jets	Sydney
16:45 AEDT	Foord 9'; Ledbrook 35'; De Vanna 98'	Report	Gilliland 53'; Andrews 90+2'	Stadium: Leichhardt Oval; Attendance: 2,512; Referee: Lara Lee

== See also ==
- 2017–18 Newcastle Jets FC season
