= 2016–17 Western Sydney Wanderers FC (women) season =

Western Sydney Wanderers W-League
2016–17 season
- Manager: Daniel Barrett
- Stadium: Marconi Stadium; Popondetta Park, Sydney
- W-League: 8th
- W-League finals series: DNQ
- Top goalscorer: Katie Stengel (6 goals)
- Highest home attendance: 3,455 vs Canberra United (22 January 2017)
- Lowest home attendance: 332 vs Perth Glory (29 January 2017)
- Average home league attendance: 996
Home colours	Away colours

The 2016–17 Western Sydney Wanderers W-League season was the club's fifth season in the W-League, the premier competition for women's football in Australia. The team played home games at Marconi Stadium and Popondetta Park in Sydney.

== Players ==
Note: Flags indicate national team as defined under FIFA eligibility rules; some limited exceptions apply. Players may hold more than one non-FIFA nationality.

No.	Pos.	Nation	Player
1	GK	AUS	Jada Whyman
2	DF	AUS	Caitlin Cooper
3	DF	AUS	Nikola Orgill
4	MF	AUS	Chloe O'Brien
5	FW	AUS	Helen Petinos
6	DF	USA	Kendall Fletcher
7	FW	AUS	Sarah Yatim
8	FW	AUS	Erica Halloway
9	FW	USA	Katie Stengel
10	FW	USA	Paige Nielsen
11	MF	AUS	Georgia Plessas

No.	Pos.	Nation	Player
12	FW	AUS	Rachel Lowe
13	MF	AUS	Eliza Ammendolia
14	DF	USA	Alex Arlitt
15	DF	AUS	Ellie Carpenter
16	DF	AUS	Alix Roberts
17	FW	AUS	Sophie Hancock
18	MF	AUS	Angelique Hristodoulou
22	GK	AUS	Casey Dumont
23	MF	AUS	Joanne Burgess
30	GK	AUS	Courtney Newbon
—	MF	AUS	Alyssa Rose

=== Transfers in ===
No.	Pos.	Nat.	Name	Age	Moving from	Type	Transfer window	Ends	Transfer fee	Source
22	GK	(Australia)	Casey Dumont	24		Transfer	Pre-season	2017	Free	
23	MF	(Australia)	Joanne Burgess	36	Retired	Transfer	Pre-season			
14	DF	(United States)	Alex Arlitt	23	(United States) FC Kansas City	Transfer	Pre-season	2018		
		(Australia)	Rachel Lowe	15		Transfer				

== Managerial staff ==
Position	Name
Head coach	(Australia) Richard Byrne
Team manager	
Assistant coach	

== Statistics ==
=== Squad statistics ===
N	Pos.	Nat.	Name	Total					W-League
N	Pos.	Nat.	Name	Apps	Goals	Yellow card	Second yellow card	Red card	Apps	Goals	Yellow card	Second yellow card	Red card
1	GK	(Australia)	Jada Whyman	11	0	1	0	0	11+0	0	1	0	0
2	DF	(Australia)	Caitlin Cooper	11	0	4	0	0	11+0	0	4	0	0
3	DF	(Australia)	Nikola Orgill	2	0	0	0	0	2+0	0	0	0	0
4	MF	(Australia)	Chloe O'Biren	8	0	0	0	0	4+4	0	0	0	0
5	FW	(Australia)	Helen Petinos	10	1	2	0	0	10+0	1	2	0	0
6	DF	(United States)	Kendall Fletcher	12	2	1	0	0	12+0	2	1	0	0
7	FW	(Australia)	Sarah Yatim	8	1	0	0	0	4+4	1	0	0	0
8	FW	(Australia)	Erica Halloway	11	1	1	0	0	10+1	1	1	0	0
9	FW	(United States)	Katie Stengel	12	6	0	0	0	12+0	6	0	0	0
10	FW	(United States)	Paige Nielsen	12	1	1	0	0	12+0	1	1	0	0
11	MF	(Australia)	Georgia Plessas	4	0	0	0	0	1+3	0	0	0	0
12	FW	(Australia)	Rachel Lowe	9	0	1	0	0	5+4	0	1	0	0
13	DF	(Australia)	Eliza Ammendolia	8	0	0	0	0	7+1	0	0	0	0
14	DF	(United States)	Alex Arlitt	5	0	0	0	0	5+0	0	0	0	0
15	DF	(Australia)	Ellie Carpenter	11	0	2	0	0	11+0	0	2	0	0
16	DF	(Australia)	Alix Roberts	6	0	0	0	0	2+4	0	0	0	0
17	FW	(Australia)	Sophie Hancock	1	0	0	0	0	0+1	0	0	0	0
18	MF	(Australia)	Angelique Hristodoulou	8	0	4	0	0	8+0	0	4	0	0
22	GK	(Australia)	Casey Dumont	1	0	0	0	0	1+0	0	0	0	0
23	MF	(Australia)	Joanne Burgess	5	1	0	0	0	4+1	1	0	0	0
30	DF	(Australia)	Courtney Newbon	0	0	0	0	0	0+0	0	0	0	0
	MF	(Australia)	Alyssa Rose	2	0	0	0	0	0+2	0	0	0	0

- Last updated: complete
- Source: au.women.soccerway.com
- (yellow card) = Number of bookings; (second yellow card) = Number of sending offs after a second yellow card; (red card) = Number of sending offs by a direct red card.

== Competitions ==
=== W-League ===
==== League table ====
Pos	Team	Pld	W	D	L	GF	GA	GD	Pts	Qualification
1	Canberra United	12	7	2	3	33	21	+12	23	Qualification to Finals series
2	Perth Glory	12	7	2	3	22	18	+4	23	Qualification to Finals series
3	Sydney FC	12	7	1	4	22	16	+6	22	Qualification to Finals series
4	Melbourne City (C)	12	6	2	4	19	14	+5	20	Qualification to Finals series
5	Newcastle Jets	12	4	3	5	18	18	0	15	
6	Adelaide United	12	3	5	4	31	26	+5	14	
7	Brisbane Roar	12	4	1	7	15	21	−6	13	
8	Western Sydney Wanderers	12	4	1	7	14	29	−15	13	
9	Melbourne Victory	12	2	3	7	17	28	−11	9	

Source: A-Leagues
Rules for classification: 1) points; 2) goal difference; 3) number of goals scored.
(C) Champions

==== Results summary ====
Overall								Home						Away					
Pld	W	D	L	GF	GA	GD	Pts	W	D	L	GF	GA	GD	W	D	L	GF	GA	GD
12	4	1	7	14	29	−15	13	3	0	3	6	7	−1	1	1	4	8	22	−14

Last updated: complete.

==== Results by round ====
Round	1	2	3	4	5	6	7	8	9	10	11	12	13	14
Ground	A	A	H	H	B	A	H	A	H	B	A	A	A	H
Result	L	L	W	L	✖	D	W	W	L	✖	L	L	W	L
Position	9	9	7	7	7	7	7	5	6	5	6	7	7	8

A = Away; H = Home; B = Bye; W = Win; D = Draw; L = Loss

==== Matches ====
6 November 2016 1	Perth Glory	4–2	Western Sydney Wanderers	Perth
18:30 AWST	Doeglas 1'; Sutton 22'; Kerr 68', 83'	Report	Burgess 38'; Petinos 50'	Stadium: nib Stadium; Attendance: 2,011; Referee: Kelly Jones

13 November 2016 2	Sydney FC	2–0	Western Sydney Wanderers	Sydney
14:30 AEDT	L. Khamis 13', 28'			Stadium: Allianz Stadium; Attendance: 4,178; Referee: Kate Jacewicz

20 November 2016 3	Western Sydney Wanderers	2–1	Adelaide United	Sydney
15:00 AEDT	Stengel 60'; Nielsen 85'	Report	Jones 62'	Stadium: Marconi Stadium; Attendance: 457; Referee: Kelly Jones

26 November 2016 4	Western Sydney Wanderers	0–2	Brisbane Roar	Sydney
15:00 AEDT		Report	Polkinghorne 28'; Butt 38'	Stadium: Marconi Stadium; Attendance: 350; Referee: Rebecca Durcau

11 December 2016 6	Melbourne Victory	2–2	Western Sydney Wanderers	Melbourne
16:00 AEDT	Hristodoulou 2' (o.g.); White 84'	Report	Yatim 61'; Stengel 90+1'	Stadium: Lakeside Stadium; Attendance: 273; Referee: Kate Jacewicz

18 December 2016 7	Western Sydney Wanderers	2–1	Melbourne City	Sydney
15:00 AEDT	Fletcher 18', 49' (pen.)	Report	Tabain 3'	Stadium: Popondetta Park; Attendance: 513; Referee: Maddison Kennedy

26 December 2016 8	Newcastle Jets	1–2	Western Sydney Wanderers	Newcastle
15:05 AEDT	Kingsley 8'	Report	Stengel 12', 30'	Stadium: McDonald Jones Stadium; Attendance: 2,268; Referee: Lara Lee

30 December 2016 9	Western Sydney Wanderers	1–2	Sydney FC	Sydney
19:00 AEDT	Stengel 23'	Report	Kennedy 35'; K. Simon 46' (pen.)	Stadium: Popondetta Park; Attendance: 870

7 January 2017 11	Brisbane Roar	3–0	Western Sydney Wanderers	Brisbane
13:35 AEST	Butt 3', 6'; Mathyssen-Whyman 75' (o.g.)	Report		Stadium: Suncorp Stadium; Attendance: 2,503; Referee: Kelly Jones

14 January 2017 12	Adelaide United	10–2	Western Sydney Wanderers	Adelaide
19:30 ACDT	Quigley 19', 69'; Jones 29' (pen.), 65', 83'; Huerta 49', 78', 79'; Chidiac 75'; Ladas 89'	Report	Willacy 17' (o.g.); Halloway 59'	Stadium: Elite Systems Football Centre; Attendance: 876; Referee: Rebecca Durcau

22 January 2017 13	Western Sydney Wanderers	1–0	Canberra United	Sydney
14:30 AEDT	Stengel 43'	Report		Stadium: Campbelltown Stadium; Attendance: 3,455; Referee: Rachel Mitchenson

29 January 2017 14	Western Sydney Wanderers	0–1	Perth Glory	Sydney
15:00 AEDT		Report	Doeglas 90+2'	Stadium: Popondetta Park; Attendance: 332; Referee: Rebecca Durcau
