= 2017–18 W-League =

Tenth season of top Australian women's football (soccer) league

W-League
- Season: 2017–18
- Champions: Melbourne City (3rd title)
- Premiers: Brisbane Roar (3rd title)
- Matches: 54
- Goals: 185 (3.43 per match)
- Top goalscorer: Sam Kerr (13 goals)
- Biggest home win: Canberra United 6–1 Adelaide United (7 January 2018)
- Biggest away win: Canberra United 1–5 Newcastle Jets (28 January 2018)
- Highest scoring: Perth Glory 4–4 Canberra United (20 January 2018)
- Longest winning run: Sydney FC (5 games)
- Longest unbeaten run: Sydney FC (9 games)
- Longest winless run: Adelaide United (7 games)
- Longest losing run: Adelaide United (4 games)
- Highest attendance: 8,449; Western Sydney Wanderers vs. Sydney FC (9 December 2017)
- Lowest attendance: 215; Western Sydney Wanderers vs. Perth Glory (1 December 2017)
- Average attendance: 2,122
- All statistics correct as of 4 February 2018.

The 2017–18 W-League season was the tenth season of the W-League, the Australian national women's association football competition.

== Clubs ==
=== Stadia and locations ===
Team	Location	Stadium	Capacity
Adelaide United	Adelaide	Marden Sports Complex	6,000
Brisbane Roar	Brisbane	Suncorp Stadium; A.J. Kelly Park	52,500; 1,500
Canberra United	Canberra	McKellar Park	3,500
Melbourne City	Melbourne	Lakeside Stadium; CB Smith Reserve; AAMI Park	12,000; 2,000; 30,050
Melbourne Victory	Melbourne	Lakeside Stadium; Epping Stadium; AAMI Park	12,000; 10,000; 30,050
Newcastle Jets	Newcastle	No.2 Sportsground; McDonald Jones Stadium	5,000; 33,000
Perth Glory	Perth	Dorrien Gardens nib Stadium	4,000; 20,500
Sydney FC	Sydney	Allianz Stadium	45,500
Western Sydney Wanderers	Sydney	Marconi Stadium; ANZ Stadium	9,000; 83,500

=== Personnel and kits ===
Team	Manager	Captain	Kit sponsors
Adelaide United	(Australia) Ivan Karlović	(Australia) Emma Checker	Macron
Brisbane Roar	(Australia) Melissa Andreatta	(Australia) Clare Polkinghorne	Umbro
Canberra United	(Australia) Heather Garriock	(Australia) Michelle Heyman (Australia) Ashleigh Sykes	Nike; University of Canberra
Melbourne City	(Australia) Patrick Kisnorbo	(Australia) Steph Catley	Nike
Melbourne Victory	(Wales) Jeff Hopkins	(England) Natasha Dowie	Adidas
Newcastle Jets	(Australia) Craig Deans	(Australia) Emily van Egmond	Viva Teamwear; Greater Bank
Perth Glory	(Australia) Bobby Despotovski	(Australia) Sam Kerr	Healthway, National Storage, Goodlife, Macron
Sydney FC	(Australia) Ante Juric	(Australia) Teresa Polias	Puma
Western Sydney Wanderers	(Australia) Richard Byrne	(Australia) Ellie Brush (Australia) Erica Halloway	Nike

=== Managerial changes ===
Team	Outgoing manager	Manner of departure	Date of vacancy	Position on table	Incoming manager	Date of appointment
Canberra United	(Australia) Raeanne Dower	Resigned	5 February 2017	Pre-season	(Australia) Heather Garriock	22 May 2017
Sydney FC	(Australia) Dan Barrett	Resigned	15 May 2017	Pre-season	(Australia) Ante Juric	7 June 2017
Melbourne City	(Wales) Jess Fishlock	End of contract	6 July 2017	Pre-season	(Australia) Patrick Kisnorbo	6 July 2017
Adelaide United	(Australia) Huss Skenderovic	End of contract	9 July 2017	Pre-season	(Australia) Ivan Karlović	9 July 2017

=== Foreign players ===
Club	Visa 1	Visa 2	Visa 3	Visa 4	Non-Visa foreigner(s)	Former player(s)
Adelaide United	(United States) Danielle Colaprico	(United States) Makenzy Doniak	(United States) Alyssa Mautz	(United States) Katie Naughton		
Brisbane Roar	(Hong Kong) Cheung Wai Ki	(United States) Celeste Boureille	(United States) Carson Pickett			
Canberra United	(England) Laura Bassett	(Norway) Elise Thorsnes	(United States) Haley Kopmeyer	(United States) Toni Pressley		(United States) Kendall Fletcher^{G}
Melbourne City	(Japan) Yukari Kinga	(United States) Lauren Barnes	(United States) Ashley Hatch	(Wales) Jess Fishlock	(England) Jodie Taylor^{G} (New Zealand) Rebekah Stott^{A}	
Melbourne Victory	(England) Natasha Dowie	(South Korea) Jeon Ga-eul	(United States) Christina Gibbons	(United States) Kristen McNabb	(Turkey) Gülcan Koca^{A}	
Newcastle Jets	(United States) Britt Eckerstrom	(United States) Arin Gilliland	(United States) Tori Huster	(United States) Katie Stengel		
Perth Glory	(Costa Rica) Raquel Rodríguez	(United States) Amanda Frisbie	(United States) Rachel Hill	(United States) Nikki Stanton		
Sydney FC	(New Zealand) Emma Rolston	(United States) Aubrey Bledsoe	(United States) Emily Sonnett			
Western Sydney Wanderers	(Israel) Lee Falkon	(Netherlands) Marlous Pieëte	(Netherlands) Maruschka Waldus	(United States) Lo'eau LaBonta		

The following do not fill a Visa position:
^{A} Australian citizens who have chosen to represent another national team;
^{G} Guest Players

== Regular season ==
The regular season was played between 27 October 2017 and 4 February 2018, over 14 rounds, with each team playing twelve matches.

=== League table ===
Pos	Team	Pld	W	D	L	GF	GA	GD	Pts	Qualification
1	Brisbane Roar	12	9	1	2	21	12	+9	28	Qualification to Finals series
2	Sydney FC	12	8	1	3	26	16	+10	25	Qualification to Finals series
3	Newcastle Jets	12	6	2	4	26	21	+5	20	Qualification to Finals series
4	Melbourne City (C)	12	6	2	4	20	15	+5	20	Qualification to Finals series
5	Canberra United	12	5	1	6	24	27	−3	16	
6	Perth Glory	12	4	2	6	25	27	−2	14	
7	Melbourne Victory	12	3	2	7	15	19	−4	11	
8	Western Sydney Wanderers	12	3	2	7	13	21	−8	11	
9	Adelaide United	12	3	1	8	15	27	−12	10	

Source: A-Leagues
Rules for classification: 1) points; 2) goal difference; 3) number of goals scored.
(C) Champions

=== Fixtures ===
Individual matches are collated at each club's season article.

== Finals series ==
Semi-finals
2	Sydney FC (a.e.t.)	3
3	Newcastle Jets	2
1	Brisbane Roar	0
4	Melbourne City	2

Grand Final
Sydney FC	0
Melbourne City	2

=== Semi-finals ===
10 February 2018	Sydney FC	3–2 (a.e.t.)	Newcastle Jets	Sydney
16:45 AEDT	Foord 9'; Ledbrook 35'; De Vanna 98'	Report	Gilliland 53'; Andrews 90+2'	Stadium: Leichhardt Oval; Attendance: 2,512; Referee: Lara Lee

11 February 2018	Brisbane Roar	0–2	Melbourne City	Brisbane
15:00 AEST		Report	Luik 66'; Fishlock 72'	Stadium: Perry Park; Attendance: 3,870; Referee: Rebecca Durcau

=== Grand final ===
18 February 2018	Sydney FC	0–2	Melbourne City	Sydney
17:00 AEDT		Report	Fishlock 35'; Taylor 75'	Stadium: Allianz Stadium; Attendance: 6,025; Referee: Rebecca Durcau

== Regular-season statistics ==
=== Top scorers ===
As of 4 February 2018; end of regular season

Rank	Player	Club	Goals
1	(Australia) Sam Kerr	Perth Glory	13
2	(United States) Katie Stengel	Newcastle Jets	10
3	(United States) Rachel Hill	Perth Glory	9
4	(United States) Makenzy Doniak	Adelaide United	7
5	(England) Natasha Dowie	Melbourne Victory	6
5	(Norway) Elise Thorsnes	Canberra United	6
7	(Australia) Lisa De Vanna	Sydney FC	5
7	(Wales) Jess Fishlock	Melbourne City	5
7	(United States) Arin Gilliland	Newcastle Jets	5
7	(Australia) Michelle Heyman	Canberra United	5
7	(Australia) Kylie Ledbrook	Sydney FC	5
7	(Australia) Allira Toby	Brisbane Roar	5

=== Own goals ===
Player		Team	Against	Round
(Australia)	Emma Checker	Adelaide United	Perth Glory	3
(Australia)	Elizabeth Ralston	Sydney FC	Melbourne City	4
(United States)	Toni Pressley	Canberra United	Sydney FC	8
(Australia)	Sarah Carroll	Perth Glory	Newcastle Jets	8
(Australia)	Jenna McCormick	Adelaide United	Brisbane Roar	13

=== Hat-tricks ===
Player	For	Against	Result	Date	Ref
(United States) Rachel Hill	Perth Glory	Brisbane Roar	4–1	5 November 2017	
(United States) Makenzy Doniak	Adelaide United	Perth Glory	3–1	10 November 2017	
(United States) Arin Gilliland	Newcastle Jets FC	Brisbane Roar	0–3	10 December 2017	
(Australia) Sam Kerr	Perth Glory	Newcastle Jets	3–3	16 December 2017	
(Norway) Elise Thorsnes	Canberra United	Adelaide United	6–1	7 January 2018	
(Australia) Sam Kerr	Perth Glory	Canberra United	4–4	20 January 2018	
(United States) Katie Stengel	Newcastle Jets	Canberra United	1–5	28 January 2018	

== End-of-season awards ==
The following end of the season awards were announced at the 2017–18 Dolan Warren Awards night on 30 April 2018.

- Julie Dolan Medal – Sam Kerr (Perth Glory) and Clare Polkinghorne (Brisbane Roar)
- NAB Young Footballer of the Year – Ellie Carpenter (Canberra United)
- Golden Boot Award – Sam Kerr (Perth Glory) (13 goals)
- Goalkeeper of the Year – Mackenzie Arnold (Brisbane Roar)
- Coach of the Year – Melissa Andreatta (Brisbane Roar)
- Fair Play Award – Melbourne Victory
- Referee of the Year – Casey Reibelt
- Goal of the Year – Lisa De Vanna (Sydney FC v Canberra United, 15 December 2017)

== See also ==
- 2017–18 Adelaide United W-League season
- 2017–18 Brisbane Roar W-League season
- 2017–18 Canberra United W-League season
- 2017–18 Melbourne City W-League season
- 2017–18 Melbourne Victory W-League season
- 2017–18 Newcastle Jets W-League season
- 2017–18 Perth Glory W-League season
- 2017–18 Sydney FC W-League season
- 2017–18 Western Sydney Wanderers W-League season
