= 2017–18 Perth Glory FC (women) season =

Perth Glory W-League
2017–18 season
- Chairman: Tony Sage
- Manager: Bobby Despotovski
- Stadium: nib Stadium; Dorrien Gardens
- W-League: 6th
- Top goalscorer: Sam Kerr (13 goals)
- Highest home attendance: 2,104 vs. Melbourne Victory; 19 November 2017
- Lowest home attendance: 846 vs. Sydney FC; 14 January 2018
- Average home league attendance: 1,281
| Home colours | Away colours |

The 2017–18 Perth Glory FC W-League season was the club's tenth participation in the W-League, since the league's formation in 2008.

== Players ==
=== Squad information ===
As of 25 October 2017

Note: Flags indicate national team as defined under FIFA eligibility rules; some limited exceptions apply. Players may hold more than one non-FIFA nationality.

| No. | Pos. | Nation | Player |
|---|---|---|---|
| 1 | GK | AUS | Gabrielle Dal Busco |
| 2 | DF | AUS | Sarah Carroll |
| 3 | DF | AUS | Kim Carroll |
| 4 | DF | AUS | Natasha Rigby |
| 5 | DF | AUS | Patricia Charalambous |
| 6 | DF | AUS | Danielle Brogan |
| 7 | MF | USA | Nikki Stanton (on loan from Sky Blue FC) |
| 8 | MF | AUS | Shawn Billam |
| 9 | FW | USA | Rachel Hill (on loan from Orlando Pride) |
| 10 | MF | CRC | Raquel Rodríguez (on loan from Sky Blue FC) |
| 11 | MF | AUS | Nicola Bolger |

| No. | Pos. | Nation | Player |
|---|---|---|---|
| 12 | MF | AUS | Shannon May |
| 13 | MF | AUS | Jaymee Gibbons |
| 14 | MF | AUS | Caitlin Doeglas |
| 15 | MF | AUS | Alexia Moreno |
| 16 | MF | USA | Amanda Frisbie (on loan from Boston Breakers) |
| 17 | FW | AUS | Marianna Tabain |
| 18 | GK | AUS | Melissa Maizels |
| 20 | FW | AUS | Sam Kerr (Captain) |
| 24 | GK | AUS | Morgan Aquino |
| — | MF | AUS | Abbey Meakins |

=== Coaching Team ===
- Coach: Bobby Despotovski
- Assistant Coach: Jessine Bonzas

=== Transfers ===
^{Note: Flags indicate national team as defined under FIFA eligibility rules. Players may hold more than one non-FIFA nationality.}

Transfers In
| Player | Position | From | Ref. |
|---|---|---|---|
| (Australia) Nicola Bolger | MF | Sydney FC | |
| (Australia) Danielle Brogan | DF | | |
| (United States) Amanda Frisbie | MF | (United States) Boston Breakers | |
| (United States) Rachel Hill | FW | (United States) Orlando Pride | |
| (Costa Rica) Raquel Rodríguez | MF | (United States) Sky Blue FC | |
| (Australia) Marianna Tabain | FW | Melbourne City | |
| (Australia) Morgan Aquino | GK | Football West NTC | |
| (Australia) Abbey Meakins | MF | Football West NTC | |
| (Australia) Alexia Moreno | MF | Football West NTC | |

Transfers Out
| Player | Position | To | Ref. |
|---|---|---|---|
| (United States) Vanessa DiBernardo | MF | (United States) Chicago Red Stars | |
| (Australia) Rosie Sutton | FW | Western Sydney Wanderers | |
| (United States) Alyssa Mautz | MF | (United States) Chicago Red Stars | |
| (Mexico) Arianna Romero | DF | (Norway) Vålerenga | |

== Statistics ==
=== Squad statistics ===
| N | Pos. | Nat. | Name | Total | | | | | W-League |
| N | Pos. | Nat. | Name | Apps | Goals | Yellow card | Second yellow card | Red card | Apps | Goals | Yellow card | Second yellow card | Red card |
|---|---|---|---|---|---|---|---|---|---|---|---|---|---|
| 1 | GK | (Australia) | Gabrielle Dal Busco | 0 | 0 | 0 | 0 | 0 | 0+0 | 0 | 0 | 0 | 0 |
| 2 | DF | (Australia) | Sarah Carroll | 8 | 0 | 0 | 0 | 0 | 8+0 | 0 | 0 | 0 | 0 |
| 3 | DF | (Australia) | Kim Carroll | 8 | 0 | 0 | 0 | 0 | 8+0 | 0 | 0 | 0 | 0 |
| 4 | DF | (Australia) | Natasha Rigby | 8 | 0 | 0 | 0 | 0 | 8+0 | 0 | 0 | 0 | 0 |
| 5 | DF | (Australia) | Patricia Charalambous | 4 | 0 | 0 | 0 | 0 | 0+4 | 0 | 0 | 0 | 0 |
| 6 | DF | (Australia) | Danielle Brogan | 6 | 0 | 0 | 0 | 0 | 1+5 | 0 | 0 | 0 | 0 |
| 7 | MF | (United States) | Nikki Stanton | 6 | 0 | 1 | 0 | 0 | 5+1 | 0 | 1 | 0 | 0 |
| 8 | MF | (Australia) | Shawn Billam | 8 | 0 | 1 | 0 | 0 | 5+3 | 0 | 1 | 0 | 0 |
| 9 | FW | (United States) | Rachel Hill | 8 | 7 | 0 | 0 | 0 | 8+0 | 7 | 0 | 0 | 0 |
| 10 | MF | (Costa Rica) | Raquel Rodríguez | 7 | 0 | 0 | 0 | 0 | 7+0 | 0 | 0 | 0 | 0 |
| 11 | MF | (Australia) | Nicola Bolger | 8 | 1 | 0 | 0 | 0 | 8+0 | 1 | 0 | 0 | 0 |
| 12 | MF | (Australia) | Shannon May | 6 | 0 | 0 | 0 | 0 | 4+2 | 0 | 0 | 0 | 0 |
| 13 | MF | (Australia) | Jaymee Gibbons | 3 | 0 | 0 | 0 | 0 | 0+3 | 0 | 0 | 0 | 0 |
| 14 | MF | (Australia) | Caitlin Doeglas | 1 | 0 | 0 | 0 | 0 | 0+1 | 0 | 0 | 0 | 0 |
| 15 | MF | (Australia) | Alexia Moreno | 1 | 1 | 0 | 0 | 0 | 0+1 | 1 | 0 | 0 | 0 |
| 16 | MF | (United States) | Amanda Frisbie | 8 | 0 | 1 | 0 | 0 | 8+0 | 0 | 1 | 0 | 0 |
| 17 | FW | (Australia) | Marianna Tabain | 8 | 0 | 0 | 0 | 0 | 6+2 | 0 | 0 | 0 | 0 |
| 18 | GK | (Australia) | Melissa Maizels | 8 | 0 | 0 | 0 | 0 | 8+0 | 0 | 0 | 0 | 0 |
| 20 | FW | (Australia) | Sam Kerr | 5 | 8 | 1 | 0 | 0 | 5+0 | 8 | 1 | 0 | 0 |
| 24 | GK | (Australia) | Morgan Aquino | 0 | 0 | 0 | 0 | 0 | 0+0 | 0 | 0 | 0 | 0 |

- Last updated: 31 December 2017
- (yellow card) = Number of bookings; (second yellow card) = Number of sending offs after a second yellow card; (red card) = Number of sending offs by a direct red card.

== Competitions ==
=== W-League ===
==== League table ====
| Pos | Team | Pld | W | D | L | GF | GA | GD | Pts | Qualification |
|---|---|---|---|---|---|---|---|---|---|---|
| 1 | Brisbane Roar | 12 | 9 | 1 | 2 | 21 | 12 | +9 | 28 | Qualification to Finals series |
| 2 | Sydney FC | 12 | 8 | 1 | 3 | 26 | 16 | +10 | 25 | Qualification to Finals series |
| 3 | Newcastle Jets | 12 | 6 | 2 | 4 | 26 | 21 | +5 | 20 | Qualification to Finals series |
| 4 | Melbourne City (C) | 12 | 6 | 2 | 4 | 20 | 15 | +5 | 20 | Qualification to Finals series |
| 5 | Canberra United | 12 | 5 | 1 | 6 | 24 | 27 | −3 | 16 | |
| 6 | Perth Glory | 12 | 4 | 2 | 6 | 25 | 27 | −2 | 14 | |
| 7 | Melbourne Victory | 12 | 3 | 2 | 7 | 15 | 19 | −4 | 11 | |
| 8 | Western Sydney Wanderers | 12 | 3 | 2 | 7 | 13 | 21 | −8 | 11 | |
| 9 | Adelaide United | 12 | 3 | 1 | 8 | 15 | 27 | −12 | 10 | |

Source: A-Leagues
Rules for classification: 1) points; 2) goal difference; 3) number of goals scored.
(C) Champions

==== Results summary ====
| Overall | | | | | | | | Home | | | | | | Away | | | | | |
| Pld | W | D | L | GF | GA | GD | Pts | W | D | L | GF | GA | GD | W | D | L | GF | GA | GD |
|---|---|---|---|---|---|---|---|---|---|---|---|---|---|---|---|---|---|---|---|
| 12 | 4 | 2 | 6 | 25 | 27 | −2 | 14 | 2 | 1 | 3 | 14 | 14 | 0 | 2 | 1 | 3 | 11 | 13 | −2 |

Last updated: 28 January 2018.
Source: Competitive Matches

==== Results by round ====
| Round | 1 | 2 | 3 | 4 | 5 | 6 | 7 | 8 | 9 | 10 | 11 | 12 | 13 | 14 |
|---|---|---|---|---|---|---|---|---|---|---|---|---|---|---|
| Ground | H | A | A | H | A | A | B | A | H | A | H | H | H | B |
| Result | W | W | L | W | L | W | ✖ | D | L | L | L | D | L | ✖ |
| Position | 1 | 1 | 1 | 1 | 1 | 1 | 1 | 2 | 4 | 5 | 6 | 6 | 6 | 6 |

Updated to match(es) played on 4 February 2018. Source: Competitive Matches
A = Away; H = Home; B = Bye; W = Win; D = Draw; L = Loss

==== Matches ====
Win Draw Loss

| 27 October 2017 1 | Perth Glory | 4–1 | Melbourne City | Perth |
| 19:00 AWST | Kerr 3'; Hill 74', 90+3'; Bolger 83' | Report | Simon 48' | Stadium: nib Stadium; Attendance: 1,308; Referee: Rachel Mitchenson |

| 5 November 2017 2 | Brisbane Roar | 1–4 | Perth Glory | Brisbane |
| 13:30 AEST | Polkinghorne 43' | Report | Hill 42', 59', 83'; Kerr 77' (pen.) | Stadium: Suncorp Stadium; Attendance: 4,120; Referee: Maddison Kennedy |

| 10 November 2017 3 | Adelaide United | 3–1 | Perth Glory | Adelaide |
| 16:50 ACDT | Doniak 4', 31', 74' | Report | Checker 50' (o.g.) | Stadium: Marden Sports Complex; Attendance: 947; Referee: Lara Lee |

| 19 November 2017 4 | Perth Glory | 3–1 | Melbourne Victory | Perth |
| 13:30 AWST | Hill 54'; Kerr 65', 77' | Report | Dowie 52' | Stadium: nib Stadium; Attendance: 2,104; Referee: Katie Patterson |

| 25 November 2017 5 | Canberra United | 3–2 | Perth Glory | Canberra |
| 16:00 AEDT | Maher 18'; Sayer 57'; Bassett 70' | Report | Hill 45'; Moreno 87' | Stadium: McKellar Park; Attendance: 1,004; Referee: Rachel Mitchenson |

| 1 December 2017 6 | Western Sydney Wanderers | 0–1 | Perth Glory | Sydney |
| 19:30 AEDT | | Report | Kerr 50' | Stadium: Marconi Stadium; Attendance: 215; Referee: Maddison Kennedy |

| 16 December 2017 8 | Newcastle Jets | 3–3 | Perth Glory | Newcastle |
| 20:15 AEDT | Gilliland 31'; Stengel 83'; S. Carroll 90+4' (o.g.) | Report | Kerr 77', 82', 84' | Stadium: McDonald Jones Stadium; Attendance: 3,210; Referee: Maddison Kennedy |

| 29 December 2017 9 | Perth Glory | 0–2 | Brisbane Roar | Perth |
| 19:00 AWST | | Report | Raso 59'; Toby 66' | Stadium: Dorrien Gardens; Attendance: 1,046; Referee: Rebecca Durcau |

| 7 January 2018 10 | Melbourne City | 3–0 | Perth Glory | Melbourne |
| 16:30 AEDT | Hatch 25'; Vlajnic 35'; Kinga 43' | Report | | Stadium: City Football Academy; Attendance: 508; Referee: Casey Reibelt |

| 14 January 2018 11 | Perth Glory | 0–2 | Sydney FC | Perth |
| 19:00 AWST | | Report | De Vanna 20'; Logarzo 48' | Stadium: Dorrien Gardens; Attendance: 846; Referee: Kate Jacewicz |

| 20 January 2018 12 | Perth Glory | 4–4 | Canberra United | Bunbury |
| 16:30 AWST | Kerr 13', 16', 43'; Hill 22' | Report | Sykes 24', 34'; Maher 45+3'; Thorsnes 62' | Stadium: Hay Park; Attendance: 1,369; Referee: Katie Patterson |

| 28 January 2018 13 | Perth Glory | 3–4 | Western Sydney Wanderers | Perth |
| 20:15 AWST | Kerr 51', 61'; Hill 78' | Report | Lowe 1'; Brush 4'; Price 88'; Halloway 90' | Stadium: nib Stadium; Attendance: 1,015; Referee: Casey Reibelt |

== See also ==
- 2017–18 Perth Glory FC season
