= Britt Eckerstrom =

Retired American soccer player

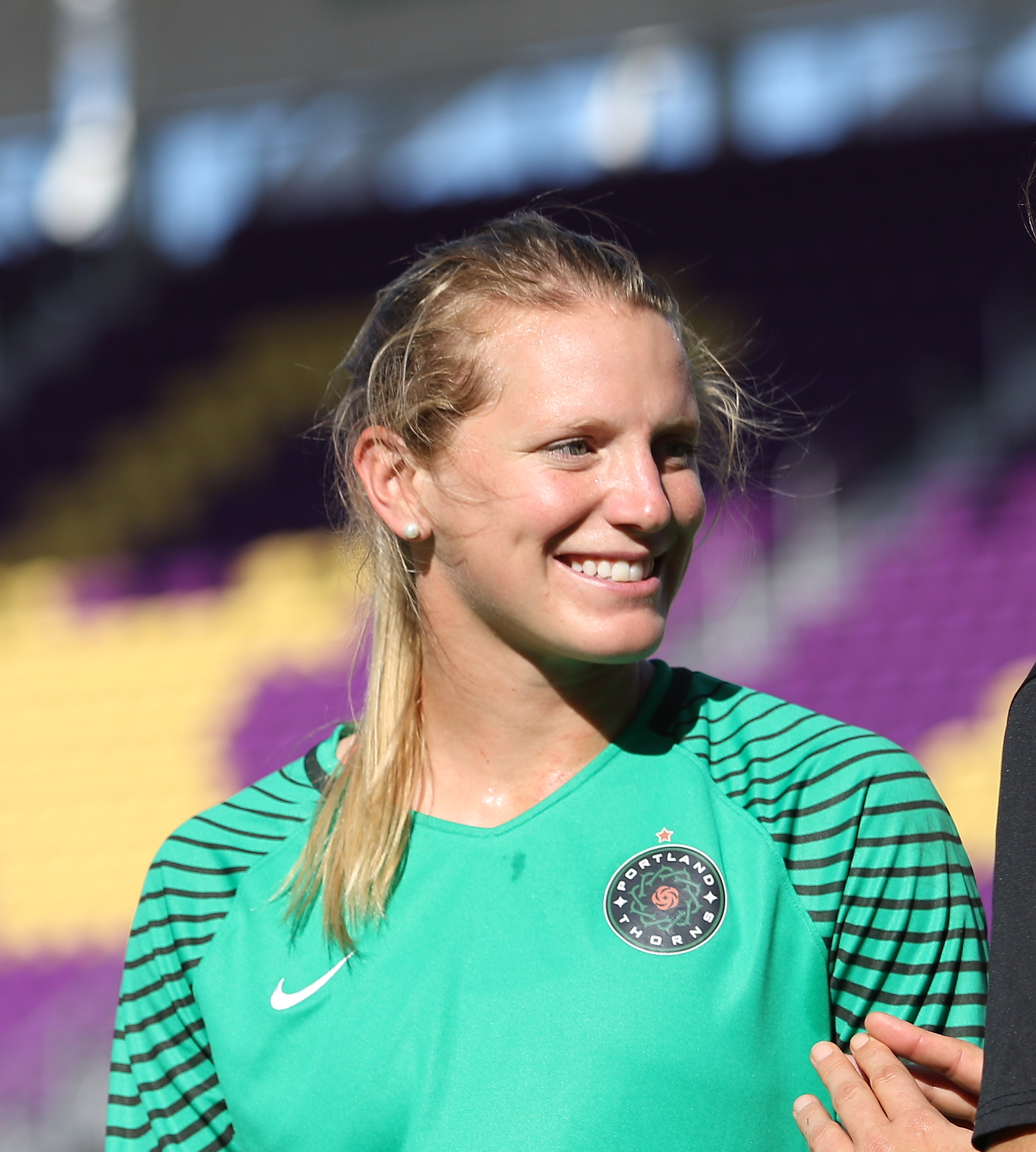
- Eckerstrom with the Portland Thorns in 2017

Personal information
- Full name: Britt Ellen Eckerstrom
- Date of birth: May 28, 1993 (age 33)
- Place of birth: Rockville, Maryland, United States
- Height: 5 ft 8 in (1.73 m)
- Position: Goalkeeper

College career
Years	Team	Apps	(Gls)
2011–2015	Penn State Nittany Lions	85	(0)

Senior career*
Years	Team	Apps	(Gls)
2013	Ottawa Fury		
2014	Colorado Pride		
2016	Western New York Flash	3	(0)
2017–2021	Portland Thorns	15	(0)
2017–2019	→ Newcastle Jets (loan)	22	(0)

International career
2009	United States U17		
- * Club domestic league appearances and goals

Britt Ellen Eckerstrom (born May 28, 1993) is a retired American soccer player who played as a goalkeeper for Portland Thorns FC of the National Women's Soccer League (NWSL). She previously played for the Western New York Flash.

== College career ==
Eckerstrom won a national title with the Penn State Nittany Lions in 2015. She did not concede a single goal in that year's NCAA tournament. In 2016, she was awarded the Big Ten Medal of Honor, which recognizes one male and one female student from the graduating class of each Big Ten member school, for demonstrating joint athletic and academic excellence throughout their college career.

In 2013, she played with the Ottawa Fury. In 2014, she joined the Colorado Pride.

== Club career ==
Eckerstrom was drafted in the 3rd round of the 2016 NWSL College Draft by Western New York Flash.

On March 8, 2017, Eckerstrom was traded to the Portland Thorns for two fourth round picks in the 2018 NWSL College Draft.

In October 2017, Eckerstrom was loaned to Australian club Newcastle Jets for the 2017–18 W-League season, along with fellow Americans Katie Stengel, Tori Huster and Arin Gilliland.

Eckerstrom returned to the Jets in October 2018 ahead of the 2018–19 W-League season. She played every minute for the Jets, tallying 61 saves over the course of the season.

She announced her retirement from professional soccer on Instagram on January 19, 2021.

== Honors ==
Penn State Nittany Lions

- NCAA Division I Women's Soccer Championship: 2015

Western New York Flash

- NWSL Championship: 2016

Portland Thorns

- NWSL Championship: 2017
