= Tori Huster =

American soccer player (born 1989)

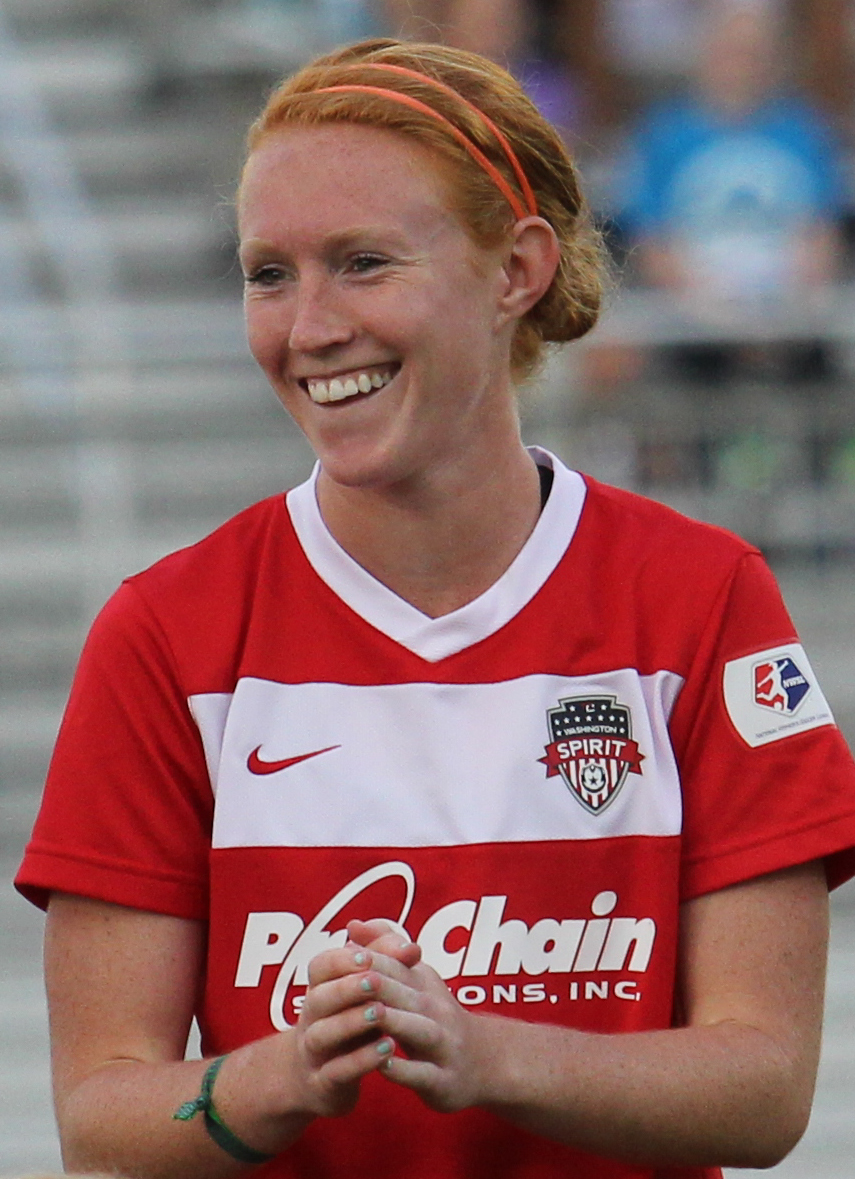
- Huster with the Washington Spirit in 2013

Personal information
- Full name: Victoria Lauren Huster
- Date of birth: September 23, 1989 (age 37)
- Place of birth: Cincinnati, Ohio, United States
- Height: 5 ft 5 in (1.65 m)

College career
Years	Team	Apps	(Gls)
2008–2011	Florida State Seminoles	92	(20)

Senior career*
Years	Team	Apps	(Gls)
2012	Western New York Flash		
2012–2013	Newcastle Jets	12	(4)
2013–2023	Washington Spirit	157	(3)
2013–2014	→ Western Sydney Wanderers (loan)	4	(0)
2014	→ Newcastle Jets (loan)	12	(3)
2017–2018	→ Newcastle Jets (loan)	12	(2)
- * Club domestic league appearances and goals as of October 31, 2021

Victoria Lauren Huster (born September 23, 1989) is an American retired soccer player who spent most of her career with Washington Spirit of the National Women's Soccer League (NWSL). In 2020, she was elected president of the National Women's Soccer League Players Association.

On December 31, 2023, Huster announced her retirement from professional soccer. She was the only player to have been on the Spirit team for all eleven seasons of its existence.

== Early life ==
Born and raised in Cincinnati, Ohio, Huster attended Saint Ursula Academy and helped lead the team to the 2007 High School State Championship with a game-winning goal in the finals. She earned NSCAA/adidas Youth All-American accolades in 2006 and 2007 and was named first team All-State in 2007. Huster was a three-time All-GGCL First Team and a two-time All-Southwest Ohio honoree. She was named a top 50 college recruit by Soccer Buzz. Strong academically, she earned NSCAA Scholar All-America accolades and was named GGCL Scholar Athlete in 2007. She also received All-Southwest Scholar honors from 2005 to 2007.

Huster played club soccer for the Ohio Elite Soccer Academy and helped the team clinch the Super Y League North American Championship in 2007. She was named a member of the All-North American final select team the same year. She was also a member of the Region II Olympic Development Program (ODP) from 2003 to 2007. She played with the SYL ODP National Select team for four years. Scoring the tying goal in the championship game Huster was part of the U-16 Ohio Elite Soccer Academy girls' team that captured the 2002 US Club Soccer National Cup in Blaine, Minnesota as a U-13 year old.

=== Florida State Seminoles ===
Huster attended Florida State University where she was a four-year starter for the Florida State Seminoles and an integral part of the 2011 squad that made the College Cup that year. She was named Atlantic Coast Conference Women's Soccer Scholar-Athlete of the Year the same year. Throughout her collegiate career, Huster scored 20 goals and served 19 assists in her 92 appearances with the Seminoles. In the fall of 2009 Tori received the Golden Torch Award, which is given to the athlete from each sport with the highest grade point average.

== Club career ==
=== USL W-League ===
Huster played for the Boston Renegades of the American W-League during the summer of 2008 and 2009. She also played for the W-League's Colorado Rush during the summer of 2010.

=== Western New York Flash ===
Out of Florida State University Huster was selected in the second round (8th overall) by the Western New York Flash in the 2012 WPS Draft. The Flash joined the WPSL-Elite in 2012 and continued its winning ways. The team won its third league title (all in different leagues) with another penalty kick decision. After finishing the regular season 9–3–2, the Flash earned the second seed in the WPSL-E playoffs and went on to defeat the Chicago Red Stars 1–1 (4–2 PKs) to win the 2012 WPSL-Elite National Championship.

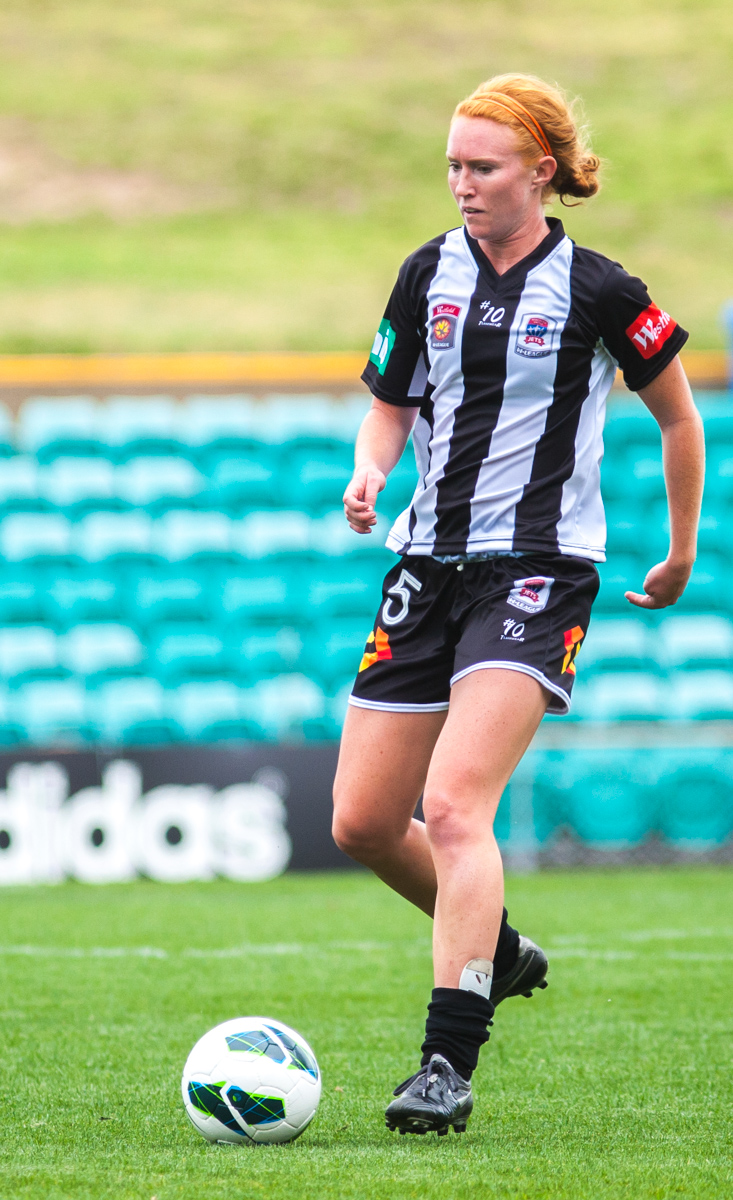
Huster playing for Newcastle Jets

=== Newcastle Jets ===
Huster signed with the Newcastle Jets in the Australian W-League for the 2012–13 season. She scored her first goal for the Jets during a 3–3 draw against Sydney FC on October 21, 2012. She started in all 12 of her appearances for the squad and scored four goals.

=== Washington Spirit, 2013–2023 ===
Huster was the second pick (seventh overall) by the Washington Spirit during the 2013 NWSL Supplemental Draft in preparation for the inaugural season of the National Women's Soccer League. She started in all 21 of her 2013 appearances and scored one goal during a 4–2 victory over the Seattle Reign FC on May 17. Huster scored her lone goal of 2014 in a 1–0 win at Chicago Red Stars on April 26. In 2015, Huster played in 17 of the Spirit's 20 matches, totaling 1177 minutes. In 2016, she played and started 19 regular season matches plus all 120+ minutes of both post season matches. Playing the most minutes of any Spirit player in 2016, she helped lead the Spirit to its first ever NWSL Championship appearance. The midfielder scored her lone goal of the season on July 2 at home in a 2–0 win against FC Kansas City.

=== Western Sydney Wanderers, 2013 ===
Huster signed with Western Sydney Wanderers in the Australian W-League for the 2013–14 season.

=== Return to Newcastle Jets, 2014 ===
In September 2014 Huster joined Newcastle Jets together with fellow Americans Katherine Reynolds and Angela Salem. Huster started all twelve of Newcastle's matches, scoring three goals.

=== Second return to Newcastle Jets, 2017–2018 ===
In October 2017, Huster returned to Australia for the off-season, joining Newcastle Jets for the 2017–18 W-League season alongside fellow Americans Katie Stengel, Arin Wright and Britt Eckerstrom.

== International career ==
Huster has represented the United States at the U-23 level. Huster was called up for the USA's matches against France and England in 2015.
