= Dan Barrett (soccer coach) =

Australian football coach

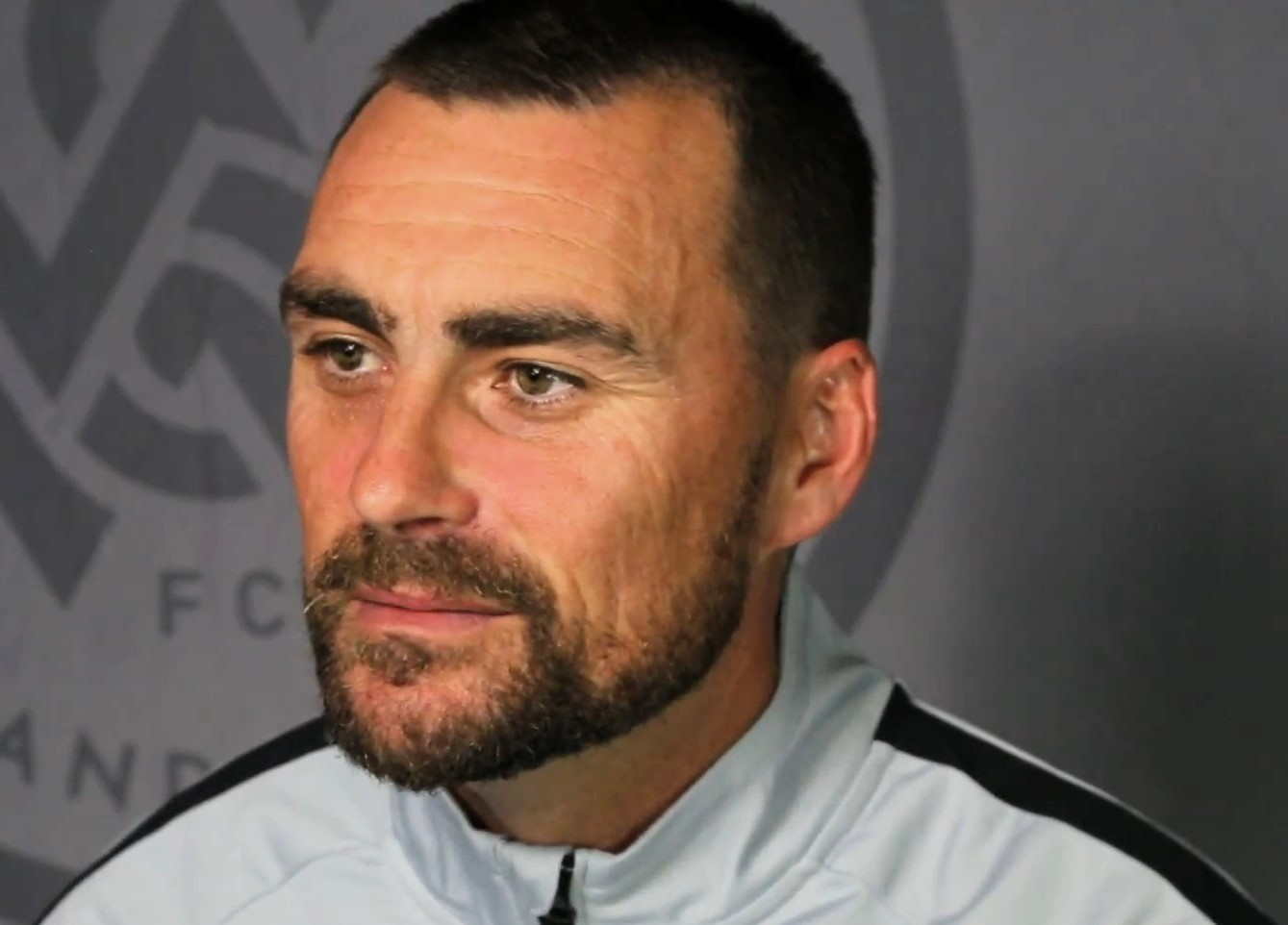
Barrett for Western Sydney Wanderers FC in 2018

Dan Barrett is a soccer coach who predominantly works in the W-league in Australia.

After playing in the Bankstown and Canterbury regions for his youth career, Barrett turned his hand to coaching.

He began as a community football officer with Sydney FC before becoming the assistant under Alen Stajcic. When Stajcic took over the job as coach of the Matildas in 2014, Barrett was elevated to the head coaching position. While coach of Sydney, they played in the finals every year, and played in the grand final in 2016, where they lost to Melbourne City.

After leaving Sydney FC, Barrett was appointed the head of the female academy at Central Coast Mariners.

Barrett was then appointed as the coach for the Western Sydney Wanderers for the 2018–19 season, where he aimed to improve on the club's history of under-performance, but he was replaced after one season in charge with Dean Heffernan.

In September 2025, Barrett was appointed as the new head coach of the Solomon Islands Women's National Football Team by the Solomon Islands Football Federation (SIFF). He is an Australian with extensive experience coaching top women's clubs in Australia and youth development. His first major task was the MSG Prime Minister's Cup in Papua New Guinea in November 2025
