= Katie Lampson =

American soccer player (born 1992)

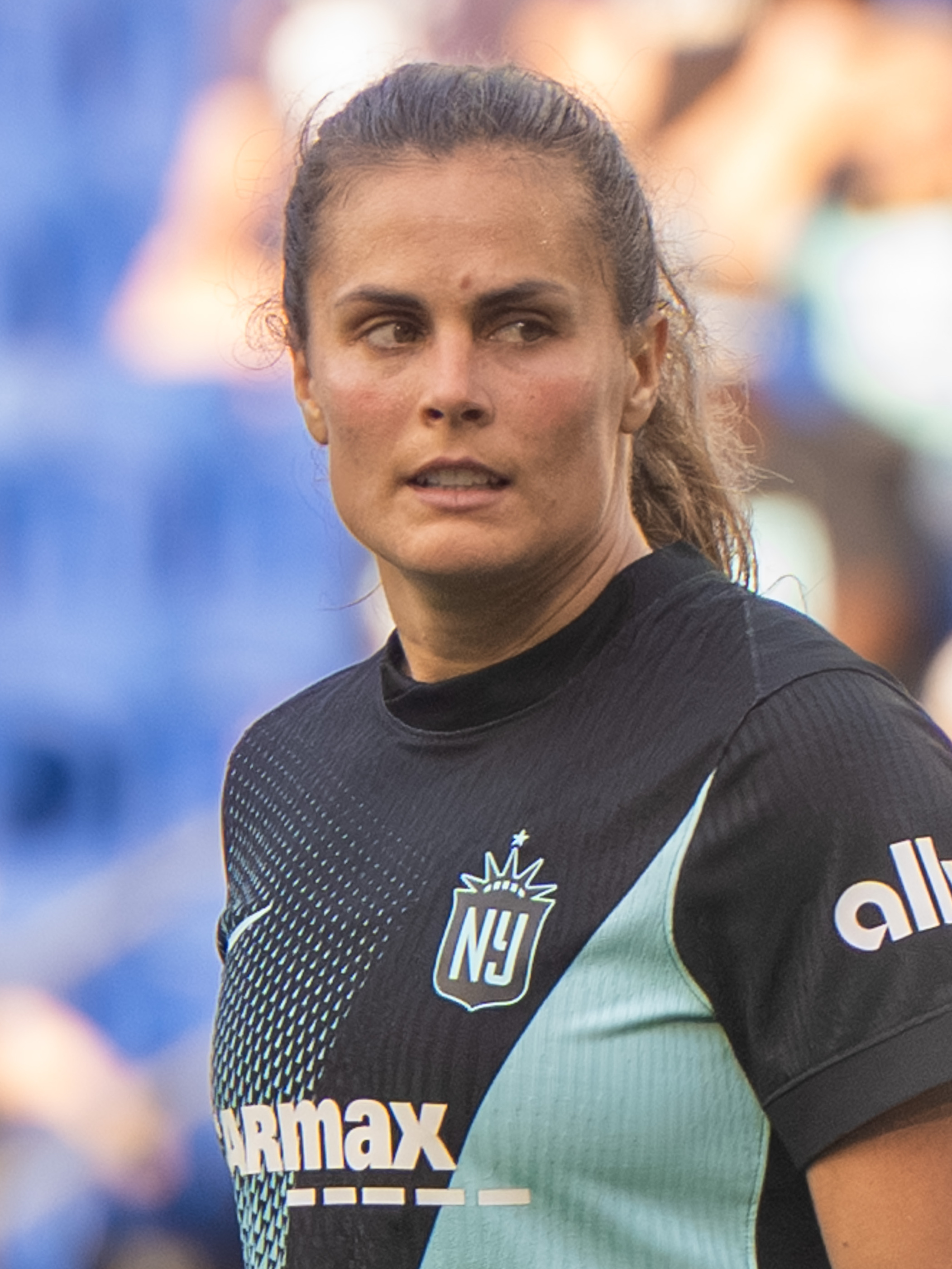
- Lampson with Gotham FC in 2025

Personal information
- Birth name: Katherine Nicole Stengel
- Date of birth: February 29, 1992 (age 34)
- Place of birth: Melbourne, Florida, United States
- Height: 5 ft 9 in (1.75 m)
- Position: Forward

Youth career
- Space Coast United
- 2006–2009: Viera High School

College career
Years	Team	Apps	(Gls)
2010–2013	Wake Forest Demon Deacons	75	(50)

Senior career*
Years	Team	Apps	(Gls)
2013–2014	Los Angeles Blues		
2014–2015	Bayern Munich	22	(9)
2016–2017	Washington Spirit	24	(4)
2016–2017	→ Western Sydney; Wanderers (loan)	12	(6)
2017	Boston Breakers	12	(0)
2017–2018	→ Newcastle Jets (loan)	12	(10)
2018–2019	Utah Royals	47	(8)
2018–2019	→ Newcastle Jets (loan)	6	(3)
2019–2020	→ Canberra United (loan)	3	(1)
2020–2021	Houston Dash	1	(0)
2021–2022	Vålerenga	11	(4)
2022–2023	Liverpool	33	(17)
2023	→ NJ/NY Gotham FC (loan)	10	(3)
2023–2024	NJ/NY Gotham FC	15	(0)
2024–2025	Crystal Palace	20	(4)
2025–2026	Gotham FC	22	(1)
Total		250+	(70+)

International career
- United States U-18
2011–2012	United States U-20	19	(6)
2014–2015	United States U-23	6	(1)
- * Club domestic league appearances and goals as of 14:26, June 30, 2026 (UTC)

Katherine Nicole Lampson (née Stengel; born February 29, 1992) is an American former professional soccer player who played as a forward. Lampson previously played for the Boston Breakers, Washington Spirit, Utah Royals, Houston Dash, and Gotham FC in the National Women's Soccer League (NWSL), Bayern Munich in the German Frauen-Bundesliga, both Western Sydney Wanderers and Newcastle Jets in the Australian W-League, and both Liverpool and Crystal Palace in the English Women's Super League. In 2012, she was part of the United States Under-20 team that won the 2012 CONCACAF Women's U-20 Championship and the 2012 FIFA U-20 Women's World Cup.

== Early life ==
Lampson attended Viera High School in Viera, Florida. She attended Wake Forest University from 2010 to 2013 where she played for the Demon Deacons women's soccer team. Lampson completed her college career as the highest-scoring player in Wake Forest history with 50 goals in 75 games, and she was a four-time All-ACC honoree and a three-time All-America, becoming in 2011 the first Wake Forest player to be named first-team All America.

== Club career ==
=== Bayern Munich ===
In January 2014, Lampson skipped the 2014 NWSL College Draft and instead joined the Los Angeles Blues of the since-disbanded USL W-League. In June 2014, Lampson joined Frauen-Bundesliga side Bayern Munich. She helped Bayern win the 2014–15 Frauen Bundesliga title, leading the team with nine goals.

=== Washington Spirit ===
In December 2015, Lampson signed with the Washington Spirit. In her first season with the team, she played in 19 regular season matches, starting 10, totaling 928 minutes. Lampson contributed four goals during the season, tied for second most on the team. In 2016 Washington advanced to the NWSL Championship Game. The game was tied 2–2 after extra time and went to penalties. Lampson converted her penalty, but Washington lost to the Western New York Flash 3–2 on penalties.

Lampson appeared in five games for the Spirit in 2017 before she was released by the club on June 28, 2017.

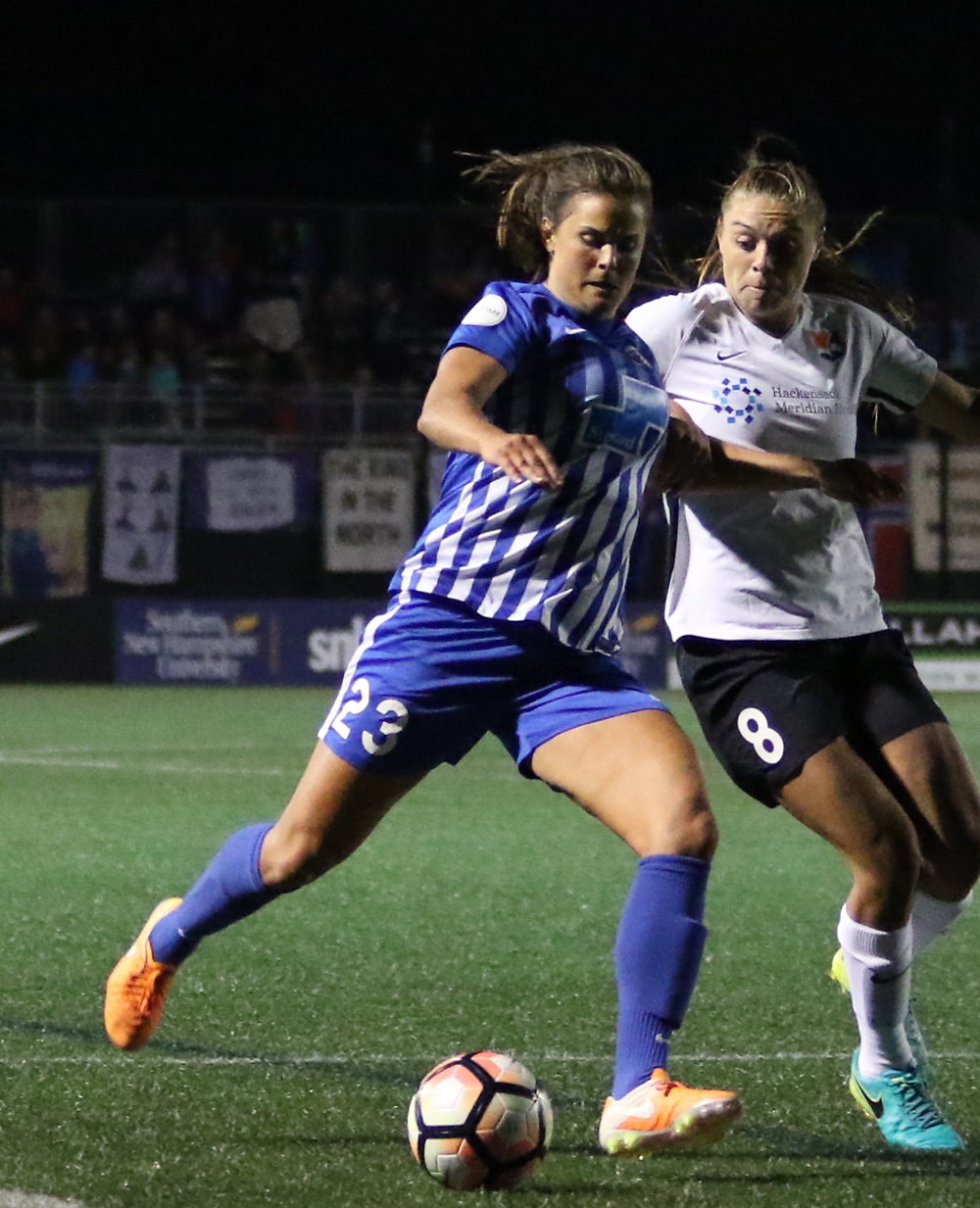
Katie Lampson playing for the Boston Breakers in the 2017 NWSL season

==== Western Sydney Wanderers (loan) ====
Lampson was signed by Australian team Western Sydney Wanderers ahead of the 2016–17 W-League season. She was the leading goal-scorer for the Wanderers, netting six goals for the season.

=== Boston Breakers ===
The day after her release by the Washington Spirit, Lampson was selected off waivers by the Boston Breakers. She appeared in 12 games for the Breakers in 2017.

==== Newcastle Jets (loan) ====
In October 2017, Lampson returned to Australia, joining Newcastle Jets for the 2017–18 W-League season. Lampson scored 10 goals for the Jets and finished second in the Golden Boot race behind Sam Kerr. Newcastle finished in third place and returned to the Finals series for the first time since the 2008–09 season.

Lampson returned to Newcastle for the 2018–19 W-League season.

=== Utah Royals ===
After the Boston Breakers folded ahead of the 2018 season, Lampson was selected by the Utah Royals in the Boston Breakers dispersal draft. Lampson appeared in 23 games for the Royals. She scored a team leading six goals and scored the first brace in Royals history.

Lampson returned to the Royals for the 2019 season. She appeared in all 24 games and scored 2 goals.

=== Houston Dash ===
On January 8, 2020, the Utah Royals traded Lampson and a third-round pick in the 2020 NWSL College Draft to the Houston Dash in exchange for their second-round picks in the 2020 and 2021 College Drafts. She was waived by the club in May 2021.

=== Liverpool ===
On January 6, 2022, Liverpool signed Lampson, reuniting her with manager Matt Beard. Lampson had played for Beard previously at the Boston Breakers.

=== NJ/NY Gotham FC ===
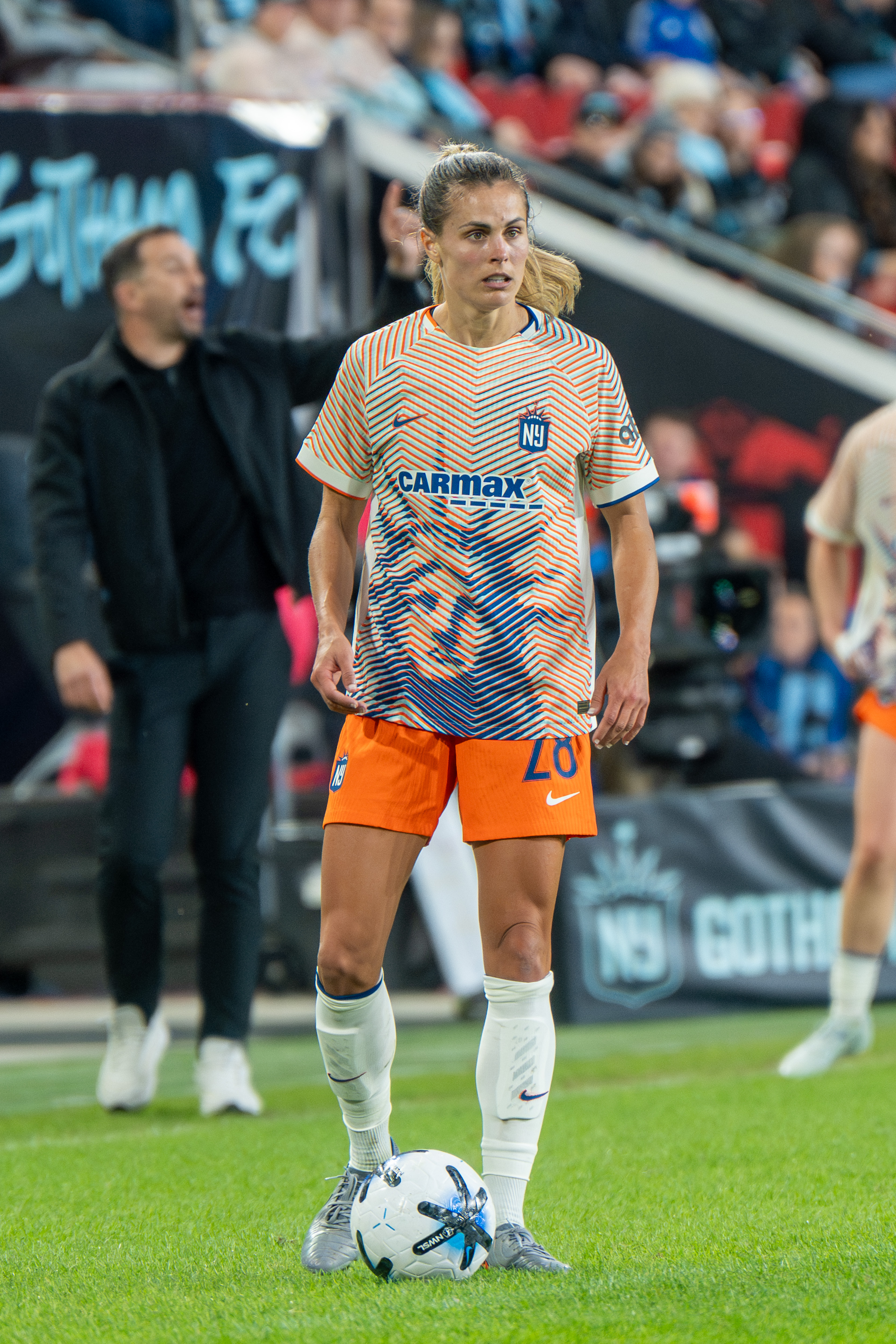
Lampson with Gotham FC in 2026

On July 5, 2023, Liverpool loaned Lampson to American club NJ/NY Gotham FC until September 3, 2023. The loan was later made permanent, as Gotham acquired Lampson on a permanent transfer on September 13, 2023.

=== Crystal Palace ===
After just over a year at Gotham FC, Lampson signed a two-year deal with Crystal Palace on September 13, 2024.

=== Gotham FC ===
Lampson returned to Gotham FC on July 31, 2025, with Crystal Palace relinquishing her in exchange for an undisclosed fee. On February 24, 2026, it was announced that she had signed a contract extension with Gotham to keep her at the club through the 2026 season.

On June 30, 2026, Lampson announced her retirement from professional soccer.

== International career ==
With the United States Under-20 team Lampson won the 2012 CONCACAF Women's U-20 Championship. At the 2012 FIFA U-20 Women's World Cup, Lampson appeared in four games and scored three goals. The United States won the U-20 World Cup.

Lampson has also played for the United States U-23 women's national team. In March 2014, she received her first full national team call-up from head coach Tom Sermanni. Lampson has not yet been capped by the USWNT.

== Personal life ==
Lampson's younger sister Jackie played for North Carolina State University and her father Scott played for the Air Force Academy. She announced her engagement to former professional goalkeeper Matt Lampson in January 2026. They married around a month later, and she subsequently began using her married name professionally.

== Career statistics ==
=== Club ===
As of match played September 13, 2024

Appearances and goals by club, season and competition
Club	Season	League			National cup (Note: Includes Women's FA Cup, DFB-Pokal Frauen)		League cup (Note: Includes FA WSL Cup, NWSL Challenge Cup)		Continental (Note: Includes UEFA Women's Champions League, CONCACAF W Champions Cup)		Playoffs (Note: Includes NWSL Playoffs, W-League Finals series)		Other		Total	
Club	Season	Division	Apps	Goals	Apps	Goals	Apps	Goals	Apps	Goals	Apps	Goals	Apps	Goals	Apps	Goals
Bayern Munich	2014–15	Frauen-Bundesliga	20	9	3	0	—		—		—		—		23	9
Bayern Munich	2015–16	Frauen-Bundesliga	2	0	0	0	—		0	0	—		—		2	0
Bayern Munich	Total		22	9	3	0	—		0	0	—		—		25	9
Washington Spirit	2016	NWSL	19	4	—		—		—		2	0	—		21	4
Washington Spirit	2017	NWSL	5	0	—		—		—		—		—		5	0
Washington Spirit	Total		24	4	—		—		—		2	0	—		26	4
Western Sydney Wanderers (loan)	2016–17	W-League	12	6	—		—		—		—		—		12	6
Boston Breakers	2017	NWSL	12	0	—		—		—		—		—		12	0
Utah Royals	2018	NWSL	23	6	—		—		—		—		—		23	6
Utah Royals	2019	NWSL	24	2	—		—		—		—		—		24	2
Utah Royals	Total		47	8	—		—		—		—		—		47	8
Newcastle Jets (loan)	2017–18	W-League	12	10	—		—		—		1	0	—		13	10
Newcastle Jets (loan)	2018–19	W-League	6	3	—		—		—		—		—		6	3
Newcastle Jets (loan)	Total		18	13	—		—		—		1	0	—		19	13
Canberra United (loan)	2019–20	W-League	3	1	—		—		—		—		—		3	1
Houston Dash	2020	NWSL	—		—		4	0	—		—		4 (Note: Includes the NWSL Fall Series)	0	8	0
Houston Dash	2021	NWSL	1	0	—		2	0	—		—		—		3	0
Houston Dash	Total		1	0	—		6	0	—		—		4	0	11	0
Vålerenga	2021	Toppserien	11	4	0	0	—		3	1	—		—		14	5
Liverpool	2021–22	Championship	12	8	2	1	1	0	—		—		—		15	9
Liverpool	2022–23	Women's Super League	21	9	1	0	5	1	—		—		—		27	10
Liverpool	Total		33	17	3	1	6	1	—		—		—		42	19
NJ/NY Gotham FC (loan)	2023	NWSL	10	3	—		4	1	—		2	1	—		16	5
NJ/NY Gotham FC	2024	NWSL	15	0	—		1	0	0	0	—		—		16	0
NJ/NY Gotham FC	Total		14	2	—		5	1	0	0	2	1	—		21	5
Crystal Palace	2024–25	Women's Super League	0	0	0	0	0	0	—		—		—		0	0
Career total			208	64	6	1	17	2	3	1	5	1	4	0	243	70

== Honors ==
Bayern Munich

- Frauen-Bundesliga Champions: 2014–15

Gotham FC

- NWSL Championship: 2023, 2025
- NWSL Challenge Cup: 2026

Houston Dash

- NWSL Challenge Cup: 2020

Liverpool

- FA Women's Championship: 2021–22

United States U20

- CONCACAF U20 Women's Championship: 2012
- FIFA U20 Women's World Cup: 2012
