= Nikola Orgill =

Australian soccer player

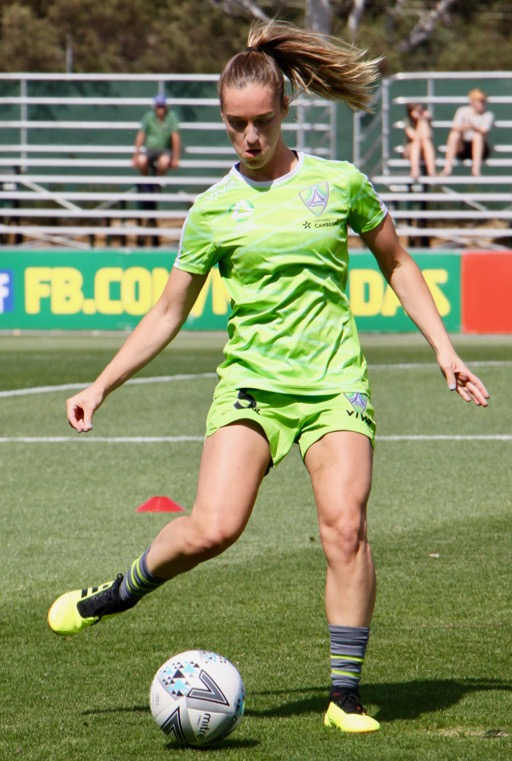

Personal information
- Full name: Nikola Emmeline Orgill
- Date of birth: 19 March 1993 (age 33)
- Place of birth: Australia
- Height: 1.69 m (5 ft 7 in)
- Position: Defender

Team information
- Current team: Klepp IL
- Number: 2

Senior career*
Years	Team	Apps	(Gls)
2016–2017	Western Sydney Wanderers	2	(0)
2017–2018	Newcastle Jets	11	(1)
2018–2020	Canberra United	23	(0)
2020	Kolbotn	12	(0)
2020	Western Sydney Wanderers	10	(0)
2021	Klepp IL	6	(0)
- * Club domestic league appearances and goals as of 26 November 2020

Nikola Orgill (born 19 March 1993) is an Australian women's professional soccer player who currently plays as a defender for Klepp IL in the Toppserien.

== Club career ==
=== Western Sydney Wanderers ===
In 2016, Orgill moved from North Shore Mariners to the Western Sydney Wanderers. She made her Wanderers debut on 6 November 2016 in a 4–2 loss against Perth Glory

=== Newcastle Jets ===
On 6 October 2017, Newcastle signed Orgill. Nikola Orgill made her debut in Newcastle colours on 29 October 2017 in a 2–1 win against her previous club Western Sydney Wanderers. Her first goal came against Sydney FC on 4 November 2017 to opening the scoring with just two minutes on the clock. She was a key player in helping Newcastle qualify for the Playoffs.

=== Canberra United ===
After one season with the Newcastle Jets, Orgill signed with Canberra United for the 2018–19 W-League season.

=== Kolbotn ===
In January 2020, Orgill joined Norwegian club Kolbotn.

=== Return to Western Sydney Wanderers ===
In November 2020, after playing 12 matches for Kolbotn in the Norwegian Toppserien, Orgill returned to Australia, signing with her first club, Western Sydney Wanderers.

== Club statistics ==
Club	Season	League		Cup		Total	
Club	Season	Apps	Goals	Apps	Goals	Apps	Goals
Western Sydney Wanderers	2016–17	2	0	–	–	2	0
Newcastle Jets	2017–18	11	1	–	–	11	1
