= Sarah Carroll =

Australian football player

Personal information
- Full name: Sarah Louise Carroll
- Date of birth: 7 March 1995 (age 31)
- Place of birth: Perth, Australia
- Height: 1.72 m (5 ft 7 1/2 in)
- Positions: Defender; midfielder

Youth career
- FW NTC

Senior career*
Years	Team	Apps	(Gls)
2011–2022	Perth Glory	85	(0)
- * Club domestic league appearances and goals as of 06:16, 17 March 2022 (UTC)

Sarah Louise Carroll (born 7 March 1995) is an Australian soccer player, who currently plays for Perth Glory in the Australian A-League Women. As part of the Australian team she won the silver medal at the 2013 AFF Women's Championship.

== Playing career ==
=== Club ===
==== Perth Glory, 2011–present ====
Carroll made her debut for Perth Glory on 11 December 2011 in a match against Newcastle Jets. She made four appearances for the team during the 2011–12 W-League season. Perth finished in sixth place during the regular season with a 2–8–0 record. She returned to the squad for the 2012–13 W-League season and helped the team finish in second place during the regular season with a 7–2–3 record and secure a berth to the playoffs. Perth was defeated in a penalty kick shootout in the semifinal match against Melbourne Victory after a 1–1 draw during regular and overtime.
