= Sam Kerr =

Australian soccer player (born 1993)

Sam Kerr OAM
- Kerr with Gotham FC in 2026

Personal information
- Full name: Samantha May Kerr
- Date of birth: 10 September 1993 (age 33)
- Place of birth: East Fremantle, Western Australia, Australia
- Height: 1.67 m (5 ft 6 in)
- Position: Striker

Team information
- Current team: Gotham FC
- Number: 20

Youth career
- 2006–2008: Western Knights
- WA NTC

Senior career*
Years	Team	Apps	(Gls)
2008–2011	Perth Glory	22	(5)
2012–2014	Sydney FC	24	(13)
2013–2014	Western New York Flash	41	(15)
2014–2019	Perth Glory	49	(52)
2015–2017	Sky Blue FC	40	(28)
2018–2019	Chicago Red Stars	43	(35)
2020–2026	Chelsea	93	(65)
2026–	Gotham FC	17	(4)

International career^{‡}
2008–2009	Australia U17	12	(4)
2008–2009	Australia U20	12	(4)
2009–	Australia	143	(76)
- * Club domestic league appearances and goals as of 1 November 2026 ‡ National team caps and goals as of 10 October 2026

Samantha May Kerr (born 10 September 1993) is an Australian professional soccer player who plays as a striker for Gotham FC of the National Women's Soccer League (NWSL) and the Australia national team, which she has captained since 2019. Known for her speed, skill, and tenacity, Kerr is widely considered one of the best strikers in the world, and one of Australia's greatest athletes.

Kerr is the all-time leading Australian international scorer, with 76 international goals, and was the all-time leading scorer in the National Women's Soccer League (NWSL) in the United States until 2024. She is the only female soccer player to have won the Golden Boot in three different leagues and on three different continents—the W-League (Australia/New Zealand) in 2017–18 and 2018–19, the NWSL (North America) in 2017, 2018, and 2019, and the Women's Super League (Europe) in 2020–21 and 2021–22.

Kerr started her career at the age of 15 with Perth Glory where she played from 2008 to 2012, before moving to Sydney FC. In 2013, she joined the Western New York Flash for the inaugural season of the NWSL and helped lead the team to win the NWSL Shield. She later played for Sky Blue FC and the Chicago Red Stars in the same league. In 2019, Kerr indicated her interest to play in Europe, and having fielded multiple offers from clubs such as Olympique Lyonnais, Kerr ultimately signed with Chelsea, so far winning 8 trophies with the club, including back-to-back-to-back Women's Super League titles, as well as helping the team reach the UEFA Women's Champions League final for the first time in 2021.

Kerr earned her first senior international cap in 2009 at the age of 15 and has since represented Australia at the 2010, 2014, 2018, 2022, and 2026 AFC Asian Cup tournaments, the 2011, 2015, 2019, and 2023 FIFA World Cups, and the 2016 and 2020 Summer Olympics. During the 2019 World Cup, she became the first Australian player to score a hat-trick at a World Cup tournament. In 2021, she captained the team to their historic first ever semi-final of a major tournament during the delayed 2020 Summer Olympics, resulting in their best ever fourth-place finish.

== Early life ==
External videos
- Sam Kerr: Birthplace of Dreams retrieved 12 November 2019

Kerr was born in East Fremantle, a suburb of Perth, Western Australia. She is the daughter of Roxanne (née Regan) and Roger Kerr. Her father, a professional Australian rules football player, was born in Calcutta to an English father (a featherweight boxer) and an Indian mother who played basketball. Her mother also comes from a sporting family: her father Harry and uncle Con Regan were professional footballers in the West Australian Football League and another uncle J. J. Miller was a champion jockey who won the Melbourne Cup in 1966 with Galilee.

I started at 12. Before that it was all AFL. I hated soccer when I was a kid. I never had a soccer ball around the house.

— Sam Kerr

Kerr played Australian rules football when she was young. Both her father and older brother, Daniel Kerr, were professional Australian rules footballers. She played the sport until switching to association football at the age of 12, mostly due to gender restrictions.

Kerr attended Samson Primary School and Somerville Baptist College. Despite facing some struggles transitioning from Australian rules football to association football, at age 13, she was spotted by Perth Glory striker Bobby Despotovski who described her athleticism and raw talent as "exceptional". At age 15, she made her W-League and international debuts.

== Club career ==
=== Western Knights, 2006–2008 ===
Kerr first started playing football as a junior at Western Knights in Mosman Park. After three years at the Western Knights, she trialled for the Western Australian State Team before moving to Perth Glory.

=== Perth Glory, 2008–2011 ===
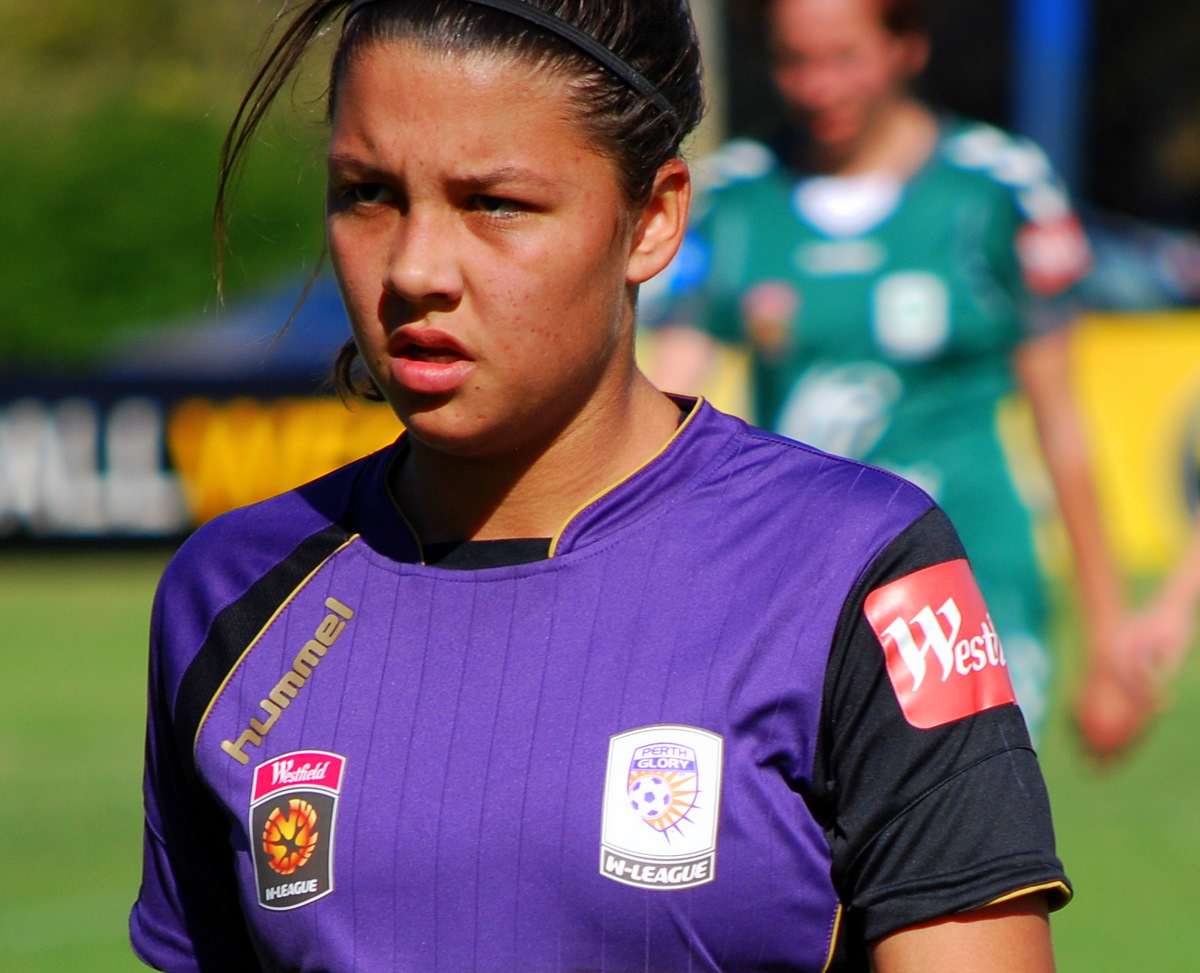
Kerr playing for Perth Glory, 2010

Kerr made her debut for Perth Glory at the age of 15 years and 45 days during the 2009 W-League season, becoming the youngest player to feature in the league. She was voted Players' Player at the 2009 W-League Awards and awarded Goal of the Year for her long–range goal against Sydney FC in round 8. During the 2010–11 season, Kerr started in all 10 matches and scored three goals. She scored a brace in the first half of a match against Adelaide United on 14 January 2011 lifting Perth to a 2–1 victory.

=== Western New York Flash, 2013–2014 ===
In 2013, Kerr signed with the Western New York Flash in the NWSL, which was just beginning. She made 19 starts in her 21 appearances for the club and scored six goals. After defeating Sky Blue FC 2–0 in the semi-finals, the Flash lost 2–0 to Portland in the final.

Kerr returned to the Flash for the 2014 season. Head coach Aaran Lines said of Kerr, "With her attributes – her speed, athleticism and instincts – if she continues to develop at the rate she is, Sam can become one of the best strikers in the world." Kerr started in all 20 matches and was the team's leading scorer with 9 goals. She was named NWSL Player of the Week for week 9 after recording a brace and assist against Portland. Following the 2014 season, Kerr was traded to Sky Blue FC in exchange for Elizabeth Eddy and a first-round pick—fourth overall—in the 2015 NWSL College Draft. The Flash used that pick to draft Sam Mewis.

=== Return to Perth Glory, 2014–2019 ===
In August 2014, Kerr returned to Perth Glory on a one-year deal as one of six Matildas to sign for Perth. She would open her account in Perth's second match against Adelaide United to give Perth the lead in the second half which they would win. The following match she scored a double in her team's 10–1 rout of Western Sydney Wanderers. After missing out in the next four games, Kerr would go and score eight goals in the final four games of the regular season which included a hat-trick against her former team in Sydney FC.

She continued her regular season form in the following season when she scored the winning goal in a 2–1 victory over Melbourne Victory in the opening round of the competition. That would be the only goal that she would score in the season with her leg giving way in a non-contact ankle injury which forced her out for the rest of the season. This would not stop Perth from giving her a one-year contract extension before the start of that season. In the 2016–17 W-League season she scored ten goals, led the team to the Grand Final, and earned the Julie Dolan Medal and the Penny Tanner Media MVP Award. In October 2018, she became the first marquee player of the W-League when she was reportedly offered $400,000 contract to stay in Perth instead of going overseas where she was offered $100,000 less. The marquee signing delivered in the 2018–19 W-League season, when she finished top of the goal scoring charts with 17 goals at above a goal a game. This included a hat-trick in the semi-final against Melbourne Victory which booked Perth's spot into the grand final.

=== Sky Blue FC, 2015–2017 ===
In 2015, Kerr joined Matildas teammate Caitlin Foord at Sky Blue FC following their participation at the FIFA World Cup in Canada. Kerr's six goals in her nine appearances ranked first on the team.

During the 2016 season, Kerr made nine appearances for Sky Blue after being away with the national team in preparation for the 2016 Rio Olympics. She scored five goals during the regular season. Kerr was named NWSL Player of the week for Week 18 after scoring two goals: an 80th-minute equalizer against the Orlando Pride and a game-winning goal against the Pride a few days later.

In the 2017 season, Kerr set a new NWSL record when she scored 4 goals in a single game after being down 3–0 to Seattle Reign at halftime. Sky Blue eventually won the match 5–4. At the age of 23, Kerr sat atop the all-time NWSL goalscoring table. Kerr won the NWSL Golden Boot and MVP award after finishing the 2017 season with a record-breaking 17 goals.

=== Chicago Red Stars, 2018–2019 ===
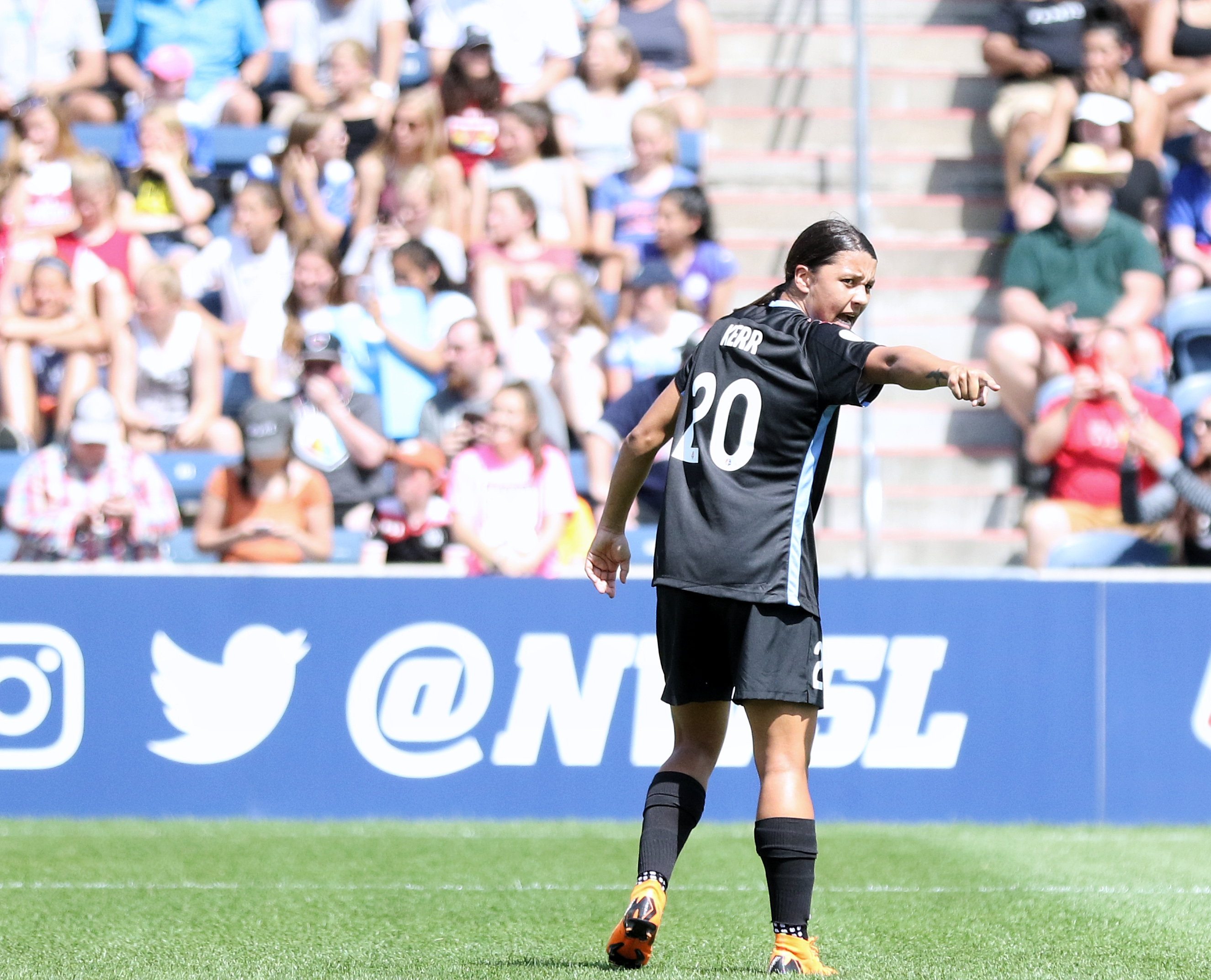
Kerr during a Chicago Red Stars match, 2018

On 18 January 2018, Kerr was traded to the Chicago Red Stars along with Nikki Stanton by the Sky Blue FC in a three-team trade with the Chicago Red Stars and Houston Dash. She got off to a slow start in the 2018 season, not scoring until the eighth match of the season when she contributed to a 1–1 draw against North Carolina Courage. In August, she was named as NWSL Player of the Month for the third time in her career as she scored five goals throughout the month of August which included two goals against Portland Thorns FC and Orlando Pride. At the end of the 2018 season, Kerr scored 16 goals and won the Golden Boot for the second consecutive season, leading to her becoming the first player to win the NWSL Golden Boot more than once, and was elected into the NWSL Best XI as a forward.

At the end of the 2019 season, Kerr and the Chicago Red Stars made their first appearance in the NWSL Championship, losing 4–0 to North Carolina Courage. Several days prior to the championship game, Kerr was named the 2019 NWSL MVP, becoming the first NWSL player to ever receive the award twice, and the only to win it while playing for two different teams. Kerr also received, for the third year in a row, the NWSL Golden Boot, leading the league with 18 goals and five assists, despite missing some games over the summer to play with Australia in the World Cup. Kerr was also named Player of the Year by the National Women's Soccer League Players Association, who presented their own awards for the first time.

At the end of the 2019 season Kerr announced that she was considering moving to a European team and had multiple offers.

=== Chelsea, 2020–2026 ===
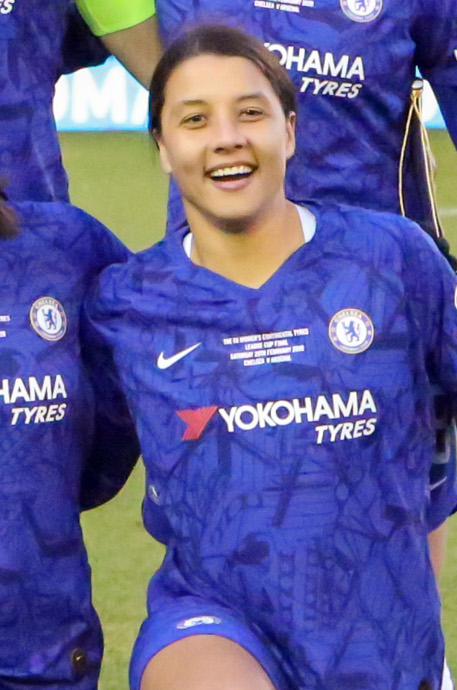
Kerr with Chelsea in February 2020

On 13 November 2019, WSL club Chelsea announced Kerr would be joining the club for the second half of the 2019–20 FA WSL season on a two-and-a-half-year contract. Kerr made her Chelsea debut against Reading on 5 January 2020 and scored her first goal two weeks later against Arsenal. She won her first trophy with Chelsea in their 2–1 win over Arsenal in the League Cup Final. Chelsea went on to win the 2019–20 league title despite a curtailed season due to the COVID-19 pandemic, based on points per match.

At the 2020 Women's FA Community Shield on 29 August 2020, Kerr created a series of goal scoring opportunities before being substituted in Chelsea's 2–0 win over Manchester City. She scored a hat-trick in the 6–0 win over Bristol City in Chelsea's defence of the League Cup title, and led goalscoring for Chelsea during the season, ultimately helping her win her second Women's Super League title during the 2020–21 FA WSL season. She scored 21 goals in 22 games, winning the Golden Boot, making her the first player to win it in three different leagues. That same season, Kerr helped Chelsea reach the final of the UEFA Women's Champions League for the first time, before being defeated by Barcelona.

During the 2021–22 WSL season, Kerr continued exhibiting fine form and was nominated for the Barclays Player of the Month for September. On 16 November 2021, Kerr signed a two-year contract extension, keeping her at the club until the end of the 2023–24 season, saying: "I can't see myself going anywhere else in the world or leaving Europe, having what I have at Chelsea." The following week, Kerr scored the winning goal in Chelsea's Champions League group stage match against Servette, and scored her third league hat-trick, against Birmingham City, within 26 minutes, as well as providing the assist for team-mate Fran Kirby's 100th Chelsea goal, with Kerr celebrating her achievement with her signature back-flip, the first time she performed it at Chelsea's homeground of Kingsmeadow. On 5 December, Kerr scored a brace in the delayed FA Cup final against Arsenal, winning Player of the Match, and helping her team lift the trophy and secure the domestic quadruple of the 2020–21 season, the first English women's club to achieve the feat. Kerr ended the 2021 calendar year as the leading goalscorer in the WSL, with 23 goals, and was second in total assists with 10, behind Kirby.

Upon returning to Chelsea after being eliminated in the Asian Cup at the beginning of 2022, Kerr continued with a fine run of goal-scoring, scoring 10 goals in 7 consecutive matches, the first Chelsea player to do so. She scored the lone Chelsea goal in a 3–1 defeat at the hands of Manchester City in the League Cup final and in Chelsea's 0–9 record-breaking win against Leicester City in the WSL on 27 March, Kerr scored a brace, repeating the feat the following week in a match against Reading, the 5th consecutive WSL match she had scored in. On 24 April, in a league game against Tottenham Hotspur, Kerr scored in her 6th consecutive WSL match, and in doing so, broke her own record set the previous season of scoring against the most opposing teams, by scoring against all opponents bar Arsenal. In April 2022, Kerr was awarded the FWA Women's Footballer of the Year, receiving 40% of the vote ahead of Vivianne Miedema and Lauren Hemp, and won the FA WSL April Player of the Month. Kerr ended the season with 32 goals (including 3 goals of the 2020–21 FA Cup held over the course of the 2021–22 season) and 9 assists across all competitions, winning the Women's Super League for the third consecutive time, and the FA Women's Cup for the second consecutive time. After a formidable season in front of goal for the Blues, she was voted Chelsea Women's Player of the Year by Chelsea supporters with over 70 per cent of the vote and was also voted Women's Super League Player of the Season. She also received the PFA Players' Player of the Year, in addition to being named in the PFA WSL Team of the Year for second consecutive year. Kerr finished as top goal scorer, netting 32 times in all competitions. She retained the Golden Boot award for the second consecutive year, having scored 20 times in the 2021–22 season. The striker scored a number of important goals during the season, including a crucial 92nd-minute winner against Aston Villa at Kingsmeadow in March 2022 to keep the Blues' title hopes alive. Kerr also scored twice as Chelsea beat Manchester United on the final day of the season, with her well-taken volley against the Red Devils being voted the Goal of the Season. She also scored the winning goal at Wembley as the Blues secured their second consecutive FA Cup. She scored her first UEFA Champions league hat-trick against Paris FC on 23 November 2023.

On 7 January 2024, Chelsea confirmed that Kerr had suffered an anterior cruciate ligament injury (ACL injury) during a warm weather training camp in Morocco and would miss the remainder of the season. On 13 June 2024, Kerr signed another two-year contract extension, keeping her at the club until 2026. On 6 December 2024, manager Sonia Bompastor announced that Kerr would not return until 2025.

On 13 March 2025, it was announced Kerr was to be included in Chelsea's upcoming Champions league squad, her first time to be included in a squad since her ACL injury, but did not play any minutes. Despite Bompastor's hopes that Kerr would return before the end of the 2024–25 season, the forward did not appear. She was training with the team during August 2025 ahead of the 2025–26 season opening. She made her return to the field against Aston Villa on 14 September 2025, 20 months after her ACL injury. She came on as a substitute in the 75th minute and then in the 93rd minute, scored her 100th goal for the club.

On 26 April 2026, Kerr scored twice in a 4–1 win over Everton, equalling Fran Kirby's record of goals scored for Chelsea in the WSL with 63 goals. She broke the record the following week after scoring in a 3–1 victory against Leicester City on 3 May.

On 14 May 2026, it was announced that Kerr would depart Chelsea at the end of the season. She played her final game for the club on 16 May, in a 1–0 win against Manchester United. Kerr scored the only goal of the game and was awarded Player of the Match. The goal — her 116th for Chelsea — meant she would leave as joint record goalscorer for the women's team (alongside Fran Kirby).

=== Gotham FC, 2026–present ===
On 29 June 2026, National Women's Soccer League club Gotham FC (whom Kerr had previously played for during the era of Sky Blue FC) announced the signing of Kerr on a contract through 2030. On 14 August 2026, Kerr scored her 31st goal for Gotham FC, marking the most in club history and her 80th career NWSL regular season goal overall. She is the first player in NWSL history to reach that milestone.

== International career ==
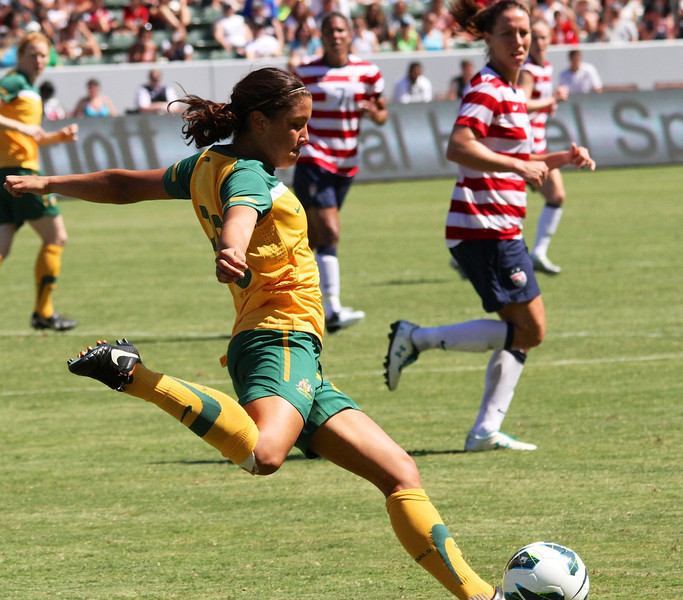
Kerr in action for Australia against the United States, 2012

In February 2009, at the age of 15, Kerr made her international debut for Australia's senior national team in Canberra as a 76th minute substitute in a friendly against Italy, which Australia lost 5–1. She scored her first international goal at the age of 16 during the 2010 AFC Asian Cup final against North Korea, helping Australia draw 1–1 in full-time, which led to Kerr's first international trophy.

=== 2010 AFC Asian Cup, China ===
In May 2010, Kerr was named to the Matildas squad to compete at the 2010 AFC Asian Cup, the qualifying tournament for the 2011 FIFA World Cup in Germany. After scoring in the second match of the group against South Korea, she scored the opening goal of the final against North Korea before seeing Australia taking out the title via a penalty shoot-out. The same year, she represented Australia at the 2010 Peace Queen Cup.

=== 2011 FIFA World Cup, Germany ===
In 2011 at age 17, Kerr was named to Australia's 2011 FIFA World Cup squad by head coach Tom Sermanni as one of seven players who were under twenty years of age. She made her World Cup debut coming on as a substitute in the 79th minute of Australia's first group stage match against Brazil. She was a starter for the team's second group stage match against Equatorial Guinea helping Australia win 3–2 and the team's final group stage match and 2–1 win against Norway. Australia finished second place in their group and advanced to the knockout stage where they were defeated 3–1 by Sweden.

=== 2015 FIFA World Cup, Canada ===
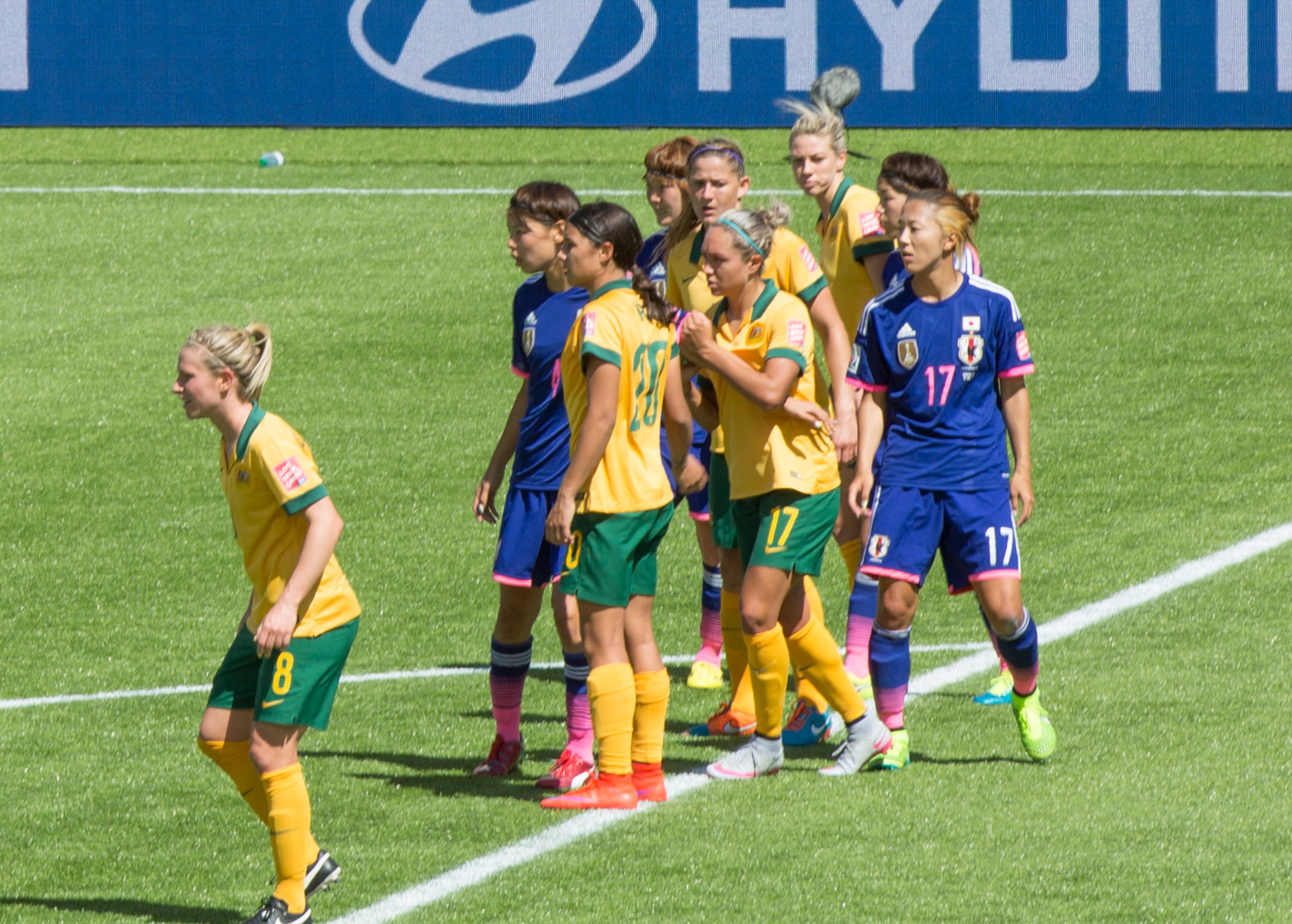
Kerr during the 2015 FIFA World Cup quarterfinal against Japan in Edmonton, 2015

After injuring her knee in December 2014 and undergoing surgery, Kerr worked hard with fitness coach Aaron Holt to recover ahead of the 2015 FIFA World Cup in Canada. Kerr was the team's starting striker during Australia's first group stage match against the United States, which Australia lost 3–1. During the team's second group stage match, she helped Australia defeat Nigeria 2–0. During the match, Kerr was elbowed in the face by Ugo Njoku, which ultimately resulted in a three-game suspension for Njoku. Kerr recovered and started during Australia's final group stage match against Sweden, a 1–1 draw. Australia's finished second in their group and advanced to the round of 16 where Kerr played in the team that defeated Brazil 1–0. She also started the quarterfinal match in the first time Australia reached this stage, but they were defeated by 2011 champions Japan 1–0.

=== 2016–2018 ===
In July 2017, Kerr was the top goalscorer at the inaugural Tournament of Nations in the United States. She scored a hat-trick in Australia's 4–2 victory over Japan, and also scored a goal against Brazil, leading Australia to win the tournament. Prior to this tournament, Kerr had scored eight goals in her first 49 games for the national team. Her hat-trick against Japan was the beginning of a run of 11 goals in six games. Kerr was named 2017 AFC Women's Footballer of the Year.

=== 2019 FIFA World Cup, France ===
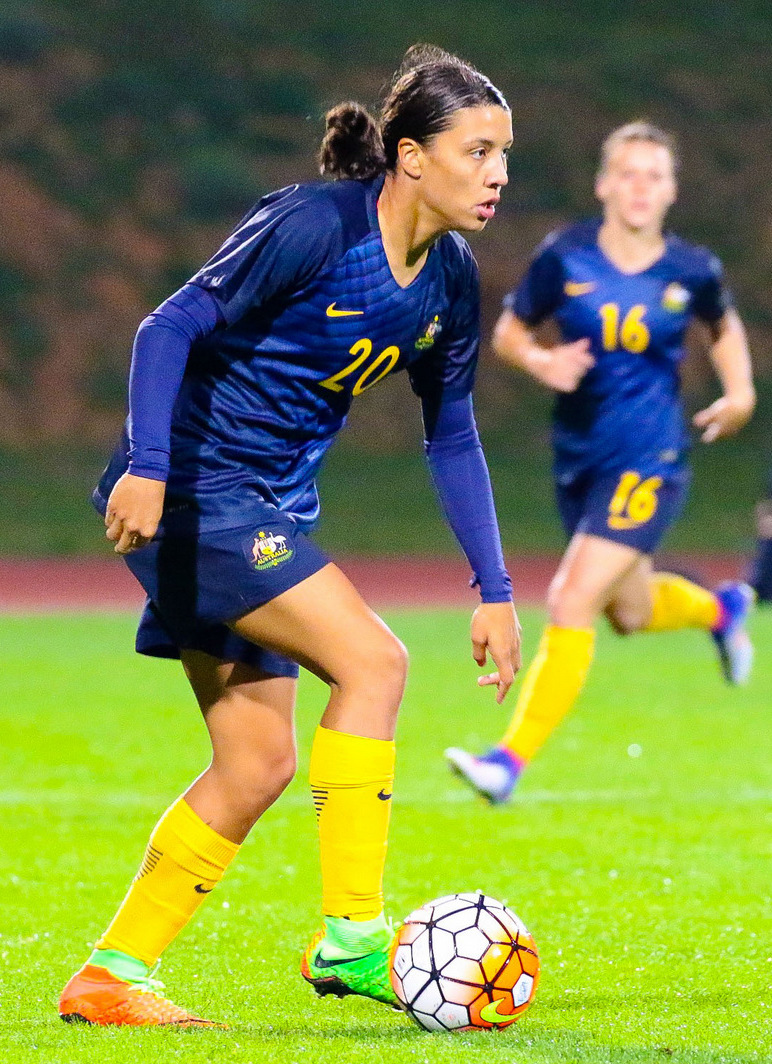
Kerr at the 2017 Algarve Cup

In February 2019, Kerr was named captain of the Matildas by newly appointed head coach Ante Milicic. Two months later, she was one of five nominees for the BBC Women's Footballer of the Year award. During the team's first group stage match at the 2019 FIFA World Cup in France, she opened up an early lead against Italy after scoring a goal off a penalty kick rebound, though Australia ultimately lost 2–1 in stoppage time. Kerr's goal was her first at a World Cup tournament and she celebrated by punching the corner flag to honour Tim Cahill, the all-time leading goalscorer for the Socceroos. During the team's second group stage match against Brazil, though Kerr was in an offside position when Monica Hickmann Alves headed the ball into her own goal, the video assistant referee (VAR) deemed that Kerr was not interfering and the goal was counted for Australia. Australia won 3–2. Kerr scored four goals in the team's 4–1 win against Jamaica and was named Player of the Match. She is the first Australian player to score a hat-trick at a World Cup tournament and the tenth player to score four goals. Australia finished second in their group and advanced to the knockout stage where they were defeated by Norway in a penalty shoot-out. Kerr's five goals at the tournament ranked fourth highest behind Ellen White of England and Americans Alex Morgan and Megan Rapinoe, who all scored six.

=== 2020 Olympic Games, Tokyo ===
At 2020 Tokyo Olympics held in 2021, Australia was grouped with United States, Sweden and New Zealand. Kerr scored in the opening game, in which they beat New Zealand 2–1. In the second game against Sweden, Kerr scored a brace but missed a penalty and ended up losing 4–2. Progressing to the quarter-finals against Great Britain, Kerr scored an 89th-minute equaliser to see the game into extra time, before getting a brace to help Australia secure a 4–3 victory and progress to the semi-finals against Sweden. During this match, Kerr scored a goal that was controversially disallowed, and Australia ultimately lost 1–0. In the bronze medal match against the United States, she scored a goal in a 4–3 defeat, to become the all-time top scorer for the Matildas, surpassing Lisa De Vanna, with 48 goals.

==== Post-Olympics ====
On 21 September, in their first match after their Olympics defeat, and in Australia's first ever match against the Republic of Ireland, Kerr won her 100th cap, the 10th Matilda in history to do so. She returned with Australia to play two friendly matches against Brazil on home soil in October, the first time doing so since before the COVID-19 pandemic, and scored her 49th international goal in the second match.

=== 2022 AFC Asian Cup, India ===
At the 2022 AFC Asian Cup, Kerr scored 5 goals in Australia's opening match of the group stage against Indonesia, and in the process, equalled and surpassed the Australian international goal-scoring record, among both male and female Australian internationals, previously set by Tim Cahill (50 international goals). She was also able to achieve the feat within fewer matches, needing 105 matches to equal the 50 goals set by Cahill, who set the record within 108 international appearances. Despite being eliminated in the quarter-finals by South Korea with a goal from her Chelsea compatriot Ji So-yun, she won the Golden Boot, scoring 7 goals in only 4 matches.

=== 2023 FIFA World Cup, Australia and New Zealand ===
On 3 July, it was announced that Kerr would captain the Matildas' 2023 FIFA World Cup squad in her fourth World Cup appearance, this time on home soil. Kerr missed the opening match against Ireland as a result of a calf injury. The team announced that she would miss the first two pool matches, but subsequently there was speculation that she would miss all of them and possibly the whole tournament. Rumours emerged that the team deliberately understated the severity of the injury. She ultimately missed all three group games but could have taken the pitch against Canada if they needed her. With a comfortable 4–0 win, there was no need for her to play.

Kerr made her first appearance in the 2023 World Cup in the 80th minute of the Matildas' win in the round of 16 clash with Denmark. She was again used as a substitute in the Australia's historic quarter-final victory over France, scoring a goal in the concluding penalty shootout. The team reached the World Cup semi-finals for the first time, facing England. Down a goal after the first half, Kerr equalized for Australia with her first goal of the tournament, but two subsequent English goals resulted in a 3–1 loss, thwarting the Matildas' hopes of reaching the final. Kerr's goal was widely praised as one of the best of the tournament thus far, and was later nominated for the FIFA Puskás Award for 2023. Due to her ACL injury in January 2024 the footballer was unable to participate in 2024 AFC Olympic Qualifying Tournament's third round in February. She was still recovering when the Matildas 18-player Olympic squad for the Paris games was named in June. After an absence of almost two years, the striker returned to the Matildas on 25 October 2025 for a friendly match against Wales in Cardiff.

=== 2026 AFC Asian Cup, Australia ===
On 1 March 2026, Kerr scored her first international goal following her return from ACL injury, netting the winner in Australia's 1–0 win over the Philippines in the 2026 Asian Cup. She scored the winning goal in a 2–1 victory over China on 17 March 2026, helping Australia to reach the tournament's final. She played in the final as Australia finished runners-up following a 1–0 loss against Japan on 21 March 2026.

=== 2026 FIFA Series, Kenya ===
Called up to the Matildas squad for the 2026 FIFA Series, on 11 April 2026, Kerr scored in Australia's opening match in the tournament, a 5–0 win over Malawi in what was the first-ever meeting between the two sides at the senior level.

== In popular media ==
In 2013, Kerr was featured in an hour-long episode of ESPN's Aussies Abroad entitled, The Matildas, which profiled four Australian national team players (Kerr, Lisa De Vanna, Kyah Simon, and Caitlin Foord) and their experience playing internationally. She was featured along with her national teammates in the EA Sports' FIFA video game series starting in FIFA 16, the first time women players were included in the game.

Kerr was featured on the cover of the July 2011 issue of Australian FourFourTwo along with four of her national team teammates: Melissa Barbieri, Kyah Simon, Thea Slatyer, and Sarah Walsh. In March 2018, she was featured in Vogue Australia as a 2018 Game Changer. In 2018, she was featured on the cover of the Australian version of the FIFA 19 video game. In September 2020, she was announced as the second-highest rated female player in FIFA 21 with a 92-rated card, which was only beat by Megan Rapinoe's 93 rating.

Kerr has an endorsement deal with Nike. In 2019, she starred in a commercial, Dream Further, that aired during the Champions League Final and 2019 FIFA World Cup and also featured Gerard Piqué, Alex Scott, Neymar Jr., Crystal Dunn, Lieke Martens and Philippe Coutinho. The same year, her trademark backflip was featured in the Nike ad, Dream Crazier along with other women athletes like Serena Williams, Megan Rapinoe, and Diana Taurasi and aired during the 91st Academy Awards. She is a brand ambassador for Powerade. In 2021, she published her first book (The Flip Out) in her autobiographical football themed children's book series, "Kicking Goals". The series is being adapted into a live action TV series, with filming to take place in Western Australia in early 2027 and releasing on Paramount+ later in the year.

In July 2022, it was announced that Kerr would feature on the cover of the Ultimate edition of FIFA 23 alongside Kylian Mbappé, making it the first time a female player would appear on the global cover of the game franchise. (Alex Morgan and Christine Sinclair had previously appeared on the cover of the US and Canada versions of FIFA 16, respectively.) New artwork featuring Kerr on the cover of FIFA 23 is also scheduled for the 2023 World Cup. Kerr was rated as the world's best women's footballer in the 2023 Women's World Cup update for FIFA 23, alongside Spain's Alexia Putellas.

== Personal life ==
Kerr has been married to American soccer player Kristie Mewis since December 2025. The couple have a son, born in May 2025. Kerr was previously in a relationship with former Perth Glory and Chicago Red Stars teammate Nikki Stanton.

In Twickenham on 30 January 2023, Kerr was detained overnight after vomiting out of a taxi window and disputing the driver's clean up fee. On 21 January 2024, she was charged with racially aggravated harassment against a police officer following the incident. Kerr pleaded not guilty, and was cleared of the charge in February 2025. Leading human rights lawyer Geoffrey Robertson commented that the case should never have gone to trial.

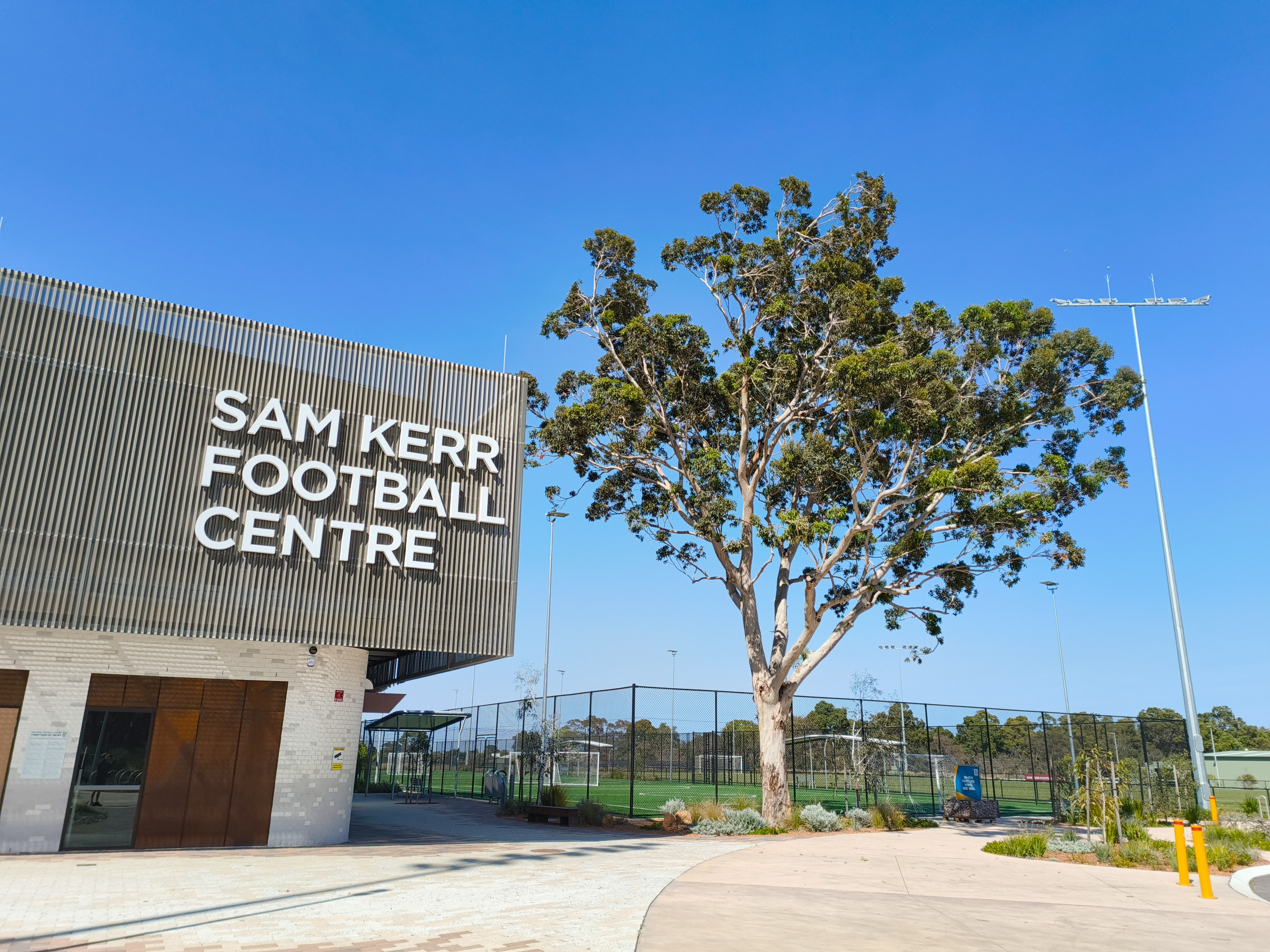
The Sam Kerr Football Centre in Queens Park, Western Australia

Kerr was the Australian flag-bearer at the coronation of Charles III and Camilla.

On 27 October 2023, the newly finished West Australian State Football Centre was named the Sam Kerr Football Centre at its official opening.

In the Australian Football League (AFL), Kerr is a supporter of the West Coast Eagles and was the club's number-one ticket holder in 2019 and 2020. Her brother, Daniel Kerr, is a former player for the West Coast Eagles.

== Career statistics ==
=== Club ===
As of match played 16 May 2026

Appearances and goals by club, season and competition
Club	Season	League			National cup (Note: Includes Women's FA Cup)		League cup (Note: Includes FA Women's League Cup)		Continental		Other		Total	
Club	Season	Division	Apps	Goals	Apps	Goals	Apps	Goals	Apps	Goals	Apps	Goals	Apps	Goals
Perth Glory	2008–09	W-League	7	1	—		—		—		—		7	1
Perth Glory	2009–10	W-League	5	1	—		—		—		—		5	1
Perth Glory	2010–11	W-League	10	3	—		—		—		—		10	3
Perth Glory	Total		22	5	—		—		—		—		22	5
Sydney FC	2012–13	W-League	12	9	—		—		—		—		12	9
Sydney FC	2013–14	W-League	12	4	—		—		—		—		12	4
Sydney FC	Total		24	13	—		—		—		—		24	13
Western New York Flash	2013	NWSL	21	6	—		—		—		—		21	6
Western New York Flash	2014	NWSL	20	9	—		—		—		—		20	9
Western New York Flash	Total		41	15	—		—		—		—		41	15
Perth Glory	2014	W-League	10	11	—		—		—		—		10	11
Perth Glory	2015–16	W-League	4	1	—		—		—		—		4	1
Perth Glory	2016–17	W-League	13	10	—		—		—		—		13	10
Perth Glory	2017–18	W-League	9	13	—		—		—		—		9	13
Perth Glory	2018–19	W-League	13	18	—		—		—		—		13	18
Perth Glory	Total		49	53	—		—		—		—		49	53
Sky Blue FC	2015	NWSL	9	6	—		—		—		—		9	6
Sky Blue FC	2016	NWSL	9	5	—		—		—		—		9	5
Sky Blue FC	2017	NWSL	22	17	—		—		—		—		22	17
Sky Blue FC	Total		40	28	—		—		—		—		40	28
Chicago Red Stars	2018	NWSL	20	16	—		—		—		—		20	16
Chicago Red Stars	2019	NWSL	23	19	—		—		—		—		23	19
Chicago Red Stars	Total		43	35	—		—		—		—		43	35
Chelsea	2019–20	FA WSL	4	1	2	0	2	0	—		—		8	1
Chelsea	2020–21	FA WSL	22	21	4	4	4	3	8 (Note: Appearances in UEFA Women's Champions League)	3	1 (Note: Appearance in Women's FA Community Shield)	0	39	31
Chelsea	2021–22	FA WSL	20	20	3	4	2	1	6	4	—		31	29
Chelsea	2022–23	FA WSL	21	12	4	6	3	6	10	5	—		38	29
Chelsea	2023–24	FA WSL	8	4	0	0	0	0	4	5	—		12	9
Chelsea	2024–25	FA WSL	0	0	0	0	0	0	0	0	—		0	0
Chelsea	2025–26	FA WSL	18	7	4	5	2	2	6	3	—		30	17
Chelsea	Total		93	65	17	19	13	12	34	20	1	0	158	116
Career total			312	214	17	19	13	12	34	20	1	0	377	265

=== International ===
As of match played 9 October 2026

Appearances and goals by national team and year
National team	Year	Apps	Goals
Australia	2009	1	0
Australia	2010	9	3
Australia	2011	7	0
Australia	2012	6	0
Australia	2013	5	0
Australia	2014	7	2
Australia	2015	8	2
Australia	2016	3	1
Australia	2017	11	11
Australia	2018	15	8
Australia	2019	11	11
Australia	2020	5	4
Australia	2021	16	7
Australia	2022	12	12
Australia	2023	12	8
Australia	2025	3	0
Australia	2026	11	7
Total		142	76

== Honours ==
Sydney FC

- W-League Championship: 2012–13

Western New York Flash

- NWSL Shield: 2013
- NWSL Championship runner-up: 2013

Perth Glory

- W-League Premiership: 2014
- W-League Championship runner-up: 2014, 2016–17, 2018–19

Chicago Red Stars

- NWSL Championship runner-up: 2019

Chelsea

- FA Women's Super League: 2019–20, 2020–21, 2021–22, 2022–23, 2023–24
- Women's FA Cup: 2020–21, 2021–22, 2022–23
- FA Women's League Cup: 2019–20, 2020–21, 2025–26; runner-up: 2021–22
- FA Women's Community Shield: 2020
- UEFA Women's Champions League runner-up: 2020–21

Gotham FC

- NWSL Shield: 2026

Australia

- AFF U-16 Women's Championship: 2009
- AFC Women's Asian Cup: 2010; runner-up: 2014, 2018, 2026
- Centenary Cup: 2013
- FIFA Series: 2026

Individual

- W-League Player's Player of the Year: 2009, 2014
- W-League Goal of the Year: 2009, 2016–17
- FFA Female U20 Footballer of the Year: 2010, 2014
- PFA Australian Women's Footballer of the Year: 2013, 2017, 2018, 2019, 2022
- Julie Dolan Medal: 2016–17, 2017–18
- PFA W-League Team of the Season: 2016–17, 2017–18, 2018–19
- W-League Golden Boot: 2017–18, 2018–19
- Football Media Association International Player of the Year: 2013, 2014
- NWSL Player of the Week: 2013: Week 9; 2016: Week 18; 2017: Week 9 12, 17; 2018: Week 15, 22
- NWSL Player of the Month: 2017: May, June, 2018: August 2019: May
- NWSL Team of the Month: 2017: May, June, July, August; 2018: July, August; 2019: April, May, September
- NWSL Golden Boot: 2017, 2018, 2019
- NWSL Most Valuable Player Award: 2017, 2019
- NWSL Best XI: 2017, 2018, 2019
- Asian Women's Footballer of the Year: 2017, 2022
- ABC Sport Personality of the Year: 2017
- IFFHS Women's World Team of the Year: 2017, 2021, 2023
- Young Australian of the Year: 2018
- ESPY Awards Best International Women's Soccer Player: 2018, 2019, 2022
- ESPY Awards Best NWSL Player ESPY Award: 2019
- The 100 Best Female Footballers In The World Winner: 2019
- IFFHS AFC Women's Team of the Decade: 2011–2020
- UK Young Achiever Award: 2021
- FA Women's Super League Player of the Month: April 2021, April 2022
- FA Women's Super League Golden Boot: 2020–21, 2021–22
- PFA WSL Fans' Player of the Month: March 2021, April 2022
- PFA WSL Team of the Year: 2020–21, 2021–22, 2022–23
- UEFA Women's Champions League Squad of the Season: 2020–21
- IFFHS AFC Women's Player of the Year: 2021
- IFFHS AFC Women's All-time Women's Dream Team: 2021
- IFFHS World's Best International Goal Scorer: 2022
- Medal of the Order of Australia (OAM): 2022
- AFC Women's Asian Cup Golden Boot: 2022
- London Football Awards FA Women's Super League Player of the Year: 2022
- Football Writer's Association Women's Footballer of the Year: 2021–22, 2022–23
- Women's Super League Player of the Season: 2021–22
- Women's Super League Goal of the Season: 2021–22
- PFA Players' Player of the Year: 2022
- PFA WSL Fans’ Player of the Year: 2020–21, 2021–22
- Chelsea Women's Player of the Year: 2021–22, 2022–23
- The Athletic WSL Player of the Year: 2021–22
- The Athletic WSL Team of the Year: 2020–21, 2021–22
- GiveMeSportW (GMS) Fans' WSL Player of the Season: 2021–22
- Key to the City of Perth: 2022
- FIFA FIFPRO Women's World 11: 2022, 2023
- Australian flag-bearer for the coronation of Charles III and Camilla: 2023
- Ballon d'Or Féminin 3rd place: 2021, 2022; runner-up: 2023

Records

Australia (2009 to present)

- All-time leading Australian international female scorer: 76 (from 5 August 2021 to present)
- All-time leading Australian international scorer: 76 (from 12 Apr 2023 to present)
- All-time leading Australian international female scorer at the Olympics: 7 (from 2020 Tokyo Olympics to present)
- Most goals scored in a calendar year: 12 (2022)
- First Australian football player to score a hat-trick at a World Cup: 2019
- Most consecutive games scored in: 7 (from 30 July 2017 to 28 February 2018)

W-League (2008–09 to 2018–19)

- Former all-time leading scorer: 70 (from 24 January 2019 to 20 March 2021: overtaken by Michelle Heyman, Tameka Yallop)
- Most goals in a season: 17 (2018–19: tied with Michelle Heyman)
- Most hat-tricks: 4 (overtaken by Michelle Heyman)
- Fastest hat-trick: 7 minutes (16 December 2017 vs Newcastle Jets)
- Most 'Golden Boot' awards: 2 (2017–18, 2018–19: overtaken by Michelle Heyman)

National Women's Soccer League (2013 to 2019)

- Former all-time leading scorer: 77 (from 8 July 2017 to 19 May 2024: overtaken by Lynn Williams)
- Former all-time assists leader: 24 (overtaken by Lynn Williams, Tobin Heath and Jessica McDonald)
- First player to score 50 goals (9 June 2018)
- First teenager to score a goal: (April 2013)
- Most goals in a season: 18 (2019)
- Most goals in a match: 4 (tied with Kristen Hamilton and Alex Morgan)
- Most shots on target in a season: 54 (2017)
- Most hat-tricks in a season: 2 (2017)
- Most consecutive seasons to score at least 10 goals: 3 (2017 to 2019)
- Most consecutive seasons to score at least 15 goals: 3 (2017 to 2019)
- First Australian international to play 100 regular season games
- Most 'Most Valuable Player' awards: 2 (2017, 2019)
- Most 'Golden Boot' awards: 3 (2017, 2018, 2019)

FA Women's Super League (2019–20 to present)

- Most goals in a full-season debut: 21 (2020–21)
- Most goals in a calendar year: 23 (2021)
- Most number of teams scored against in a season: 10 (2021 –22)
- Most hat-tricks against a single club: 2 (vs Birmingham City) (tied with Bethany England, Rachel Williams and Vivianne Miedema)
- Most first half hat-tricks: 2 (tied with Vivianne Miedema)
- First player to score against every team played against (2 September 2020 vs Everton)
- Most goals scored as a headers in one season: 9 (2020–21)
- First player to score at least 20 goals in consecutive seasons: 2020–21 to 2021–22
- Most consecutive seasons to score at least 20 goals: 2 (2020–21 to 2021–22)
- Most 'Golden Boot' awards: 2 (2020–21 to 2021–22) (tied with Vivianne Miedema)
- Most goals across all competitions in a season: 32 (2021–22)

UEFA Women's Champion League (2020–21 to present)

- Most goals in a group stage game: 4

Perth Glory (2008 to 2011, 2014 to 2019)

- All-time leading scorer: 57 (2014 to present)

Sky Blue FC (2015–2017)

- All-time leading scorer: 28 (28 June 2017 to present)

Chicago Red Stars (2018 to 2019)

- All-time leading scorer: 35 (tied with Christen Press) (20 October 2019 to present)

Chelsea (2020 to 2026)

- Most consecutive games scored in: 7 (26 February 2022 to 3 April 2022)

Other

- Most goals in a FIFA Women's World Cup game: 4, 2019
- Only football player to win the Golden Boot in 3 different leagues/continents: W-League (Australia): 2017–18, 2018–19; NWSL (North America): 2017, 2018, 2019; FA WSL (Europe) 2020–21,2021–22
- First Australian female football player to be nominated for the Ballon d'Or
- First Australian football player to place in the top 3 of the Ballon d'Or: 2021
- First Australian football player to place in the top 3 of The Best FIFA Player: 2021
- First Australian to win PFA Players’ Player of the Year: 2022
- First West Australian-born female recipient of the Key to the City of Perth: 2022
- First female footballer to be chosen to be on the cover of a FIFA video game: FIFA 23

== See also ==
- List of A-League Women records and statistics
- List of NWSL records and statistics
- List of Women's Super League records and statistics
- List of FIFA Women's World Cup hat-tricks
- List of women's footballers with 100 or more international caps
- List of top international women's football goalscorers by country
