= 2019–20 Brisbane Roar FC (women) season =

12th season in existence of Brisbane Roar (women)

Brisbane Roar (women)
2019–20 season
- Owner: Bakrie Group
- Chairman: Rahim Soekasah
- Head Coach: Jake Goodship
- W-League: 5th
- W-League Finals: DNQ
- Top goalscorer: Hayley Raso (4)
- Highest home attendance: 2,693 vs. Canberra United (23 February 2020); W-League
- Lowest home attendance: 1,682 vs. Adelaide United (14 December 2019); W-League
- Average home league attendance: 2,355
- Biggest win: 5–0 vs. Canberra United (H) (23 February 2020); W-League
- Biggest defeat: 1–3 (twice); 0–2 (once); 2–4 (once)
Home colours	Away colours	Third colours

The 2019–20 season was Brisbane Roar Football Club (women)'s twelfth season in the W-League. Brisbane Roar finished 5th in their W-League season.

== Players ==
Note: Flags indicate national team as defined under FIFA eligibility rules; some limited exceptions apply. Players may hold more than one non-FIFA nationality.

No.	Pos.	Nation	Player
1	GK	AUS	Mackenzie Arnold
2	DF	USA	Carson Pickett
3	MF	USA	Celeste Boureille
4	DF	AUS	Clare Polkinghorne
5	FW	USA	Shea Connors
6	DF	AUS	Elise Kellond-Knight
7	FW	NZL	Indiah-Paige Riley
8	DF	AUS	Kaitlyn Torpey
9	FW	USA	Rylee Baisden
10	MF	AUS	Katrina Gorry
11	DF	AUS	Natalie Tathem

No.	Pos.	Nation	Player
12	FW	AUS	Allira Toby
13	MF	AUS	Tameka Yallop
15	DF	AUS	Claire Farrington
16	FW	AUS	Hayley Raso
17	DF	AUS	Jamilla Rankin
18	MF	AUS	Leah Davidson
19	MF	AUS	Hollie Palmer
20	GK	AUS	Georgina Worth
21	DF	AUS	Winonah Heatley
22	FW	AUS	Anna Margraf
23	MF	AUS	Isobel Dalton

== Transfers and contracts ==
=== Transfers in ===
No.	Position	Player	Transferred from	Type/fee	Date	Ref.
13	MF	Tameka Yallop	Melbourne City	Free transfer	8 October 2019	
20	GK	Georgina Worth	Unattached	Free transfer	9 October 2019	
9	FW	(United States) Rylee Baisden	(Australia) Moreton Bay United	Free transfer	14 October 2019	
15	DF	Clare Farrington	(Australia) Logan Lightning	Free transfer	14 October 2019	
6	DF	Elise Kellond-Knight	Melbourne City	Free transfer	26 October 2019	
23	MF	Isobel Dalton	(England) Nottingham Forest	Free transfer	6 November 2019	
5	FW	(United States) Shea Connors	(Australia) Logan Lightning	Free transfer	12 February 2020	

=== Transfers out ===
No.	Position	Player	Transferred to	Type/fee	Date	Ref.
15	MF	Abbey Lloyd	(Australia) Capalaba FC	Free transfer	15 March 2019	
21	DF	Dani Ward	(Australia) Western Pride	Free transfer	15 March 2019	
9	FW	(England) Chioma Ubogagu	(Spain) Tacón	Free transfer	1 September 2019	
5	DF	Jenna McCormick	Melbourne Victory	Free transfer	5 October 2019	
20	GK	Annalee Grove	Canberra United	Free transfer	15 October 2019	
14	DF	Summer O'Brien	Unattached	Free transfer	12 November 2019	
17	FW	(Japan) Yūki Nagasato	(United States) Chicago Red Stars	Loan return	12 November 2019	
16	FW	Hayley Raso	(England) Everton	Free transfer	17 January 2020	
23	MF	Isobel Dalton	(Scotland) Glasgow City	Free transfer	23 February 2020	

=== Contract extensions ===
No.	Position	Player	Duration	Date	Ref.
10	MF	Katrina Gorry	1 year	8 October 2019	
7	FW	(New Zealand) Indiah-Paige Riley	1 year	9 October 2019	
8	DF	Kaitlyn Torpey	1 year	9 October 2019	
18	MF	Leah Davidson	1 year	9 October 2019	
19	MF	Hollie Palmer	1 year	9 October 2019	
11	DF	Natalie Tathem	1 year	11 October 2019	
12	FW	Allira Toby	1 year	11 October 2019	
4	DF	Clare Polkinghorne	1 year	16 October 2019	
16	FW	Hayley Raso	1 year	29 October 2019	
2	DF	(United States) Carson Pickett	1 year	1 November 2019	
3	MF	(United States) Celeste Boureille	1 year	8 November 2019	
22	FW	Anna Margraf	1 year	20 November 2019	

== Competitions ==
=== Overall record ===
Competition	First match	Last match	Starting round	Final position	Record							
Competition	First match	Last match	Starting round	Final position	Pld	W	D	L	GF	GA	GD	Win %
W-League	21 November 2019	1 March 2020	Matchday 1	5th	12	5	2	5	22	19	+3	41.67
Total					12	5	2	5	22	19	+3	41.67

Source: Competitions

=== W-League ===
==== League table ====
Pos	Team	Pld	W	D	L	GF	GA	GD	Pts	Qualification
1	Melbourne City (C)	12	11	1	0	27	4	+23	34	Qualification to Finals series
2	Melbourne Victory	12	7	2	3	24	14	+10	23	Qualification to Finals series
3	Sydney FC	12	7	1	4	21	13	+8	22	Qualification to Finals series
4	Western Sydney Wanderers	12	7	1	4	24	20	+4	22	Qualification to Finals series
5	Brisbane Roar	12	5	2	5	22	19	+3	17	
6	Canberra United	12	4	1	7	13	29	−16	13	
7	Perth Glory	12	3	2	7	19	24	−5	11	
8	Adelaide United	12	2	1	9	12	24	−12	7	
9	Newcastle Jets	12	2	1	9	12	27	−15	7	

Source: A-Leagues
Rules for classification: 1) points; 2) goal difference; 3) number of goals scored.
(C) Champions

==== Results summary ====
Overall								Home						Away					
Pld	W	D	L	GF	GA	GD	Pts	W	D	L	GF	GA	GD	W	D	L	GF	GA	GD
12	5	2	5	22	19	+3	17	3	0	3	13	11	+2	2	2	2	9	8	+1

Source: worldfootball.net

==== Results by round ====
Round	1	2	3	4	5	6	7	8	9	10	11	12	13	14
Ground	B	H	H	A	H	A	H	H	A	A	B	A	H	A
Result	X	L	L	W	W	D	W	L	W	D	X	L	W	L
Position	6	7	7	7	5	5	4	5	4	4	5	5	5	5
Points	0	0	0	3	6	7	10	10	13	14	14	14	17	17

Source: worldfootball.net
A = Away; H = Home; B = Bye; W = Win; D = Draw; L = Loss; X = Bye

==== Matches ====
The league fixtures were announced on 18 October 2019.

Win Draw Loss

21 November 2019 2	Brisbane Roar	2–3	Melbourne Victory	Brisbane
18:30 AEST	Yallop 24'; Riley 80'	Report	Torpey 10' (o.g.); Dowie 14' (pen.), 76'	Stadium: Dolphin Stadium; Attendance: 2,139; Referee: Rachael Mitchenson

28 November 2019 3	Brisbane Roar	1–3	Western Sydney Wanderers	Brisbane
18:30 AEST	Baisden 55'	Report	Hamilton 10', 45', 64'	Stadium: Lions Stadium; Attendance: 2,535; Referee: Isabella Blaess

5 December 2019 4	Canberra United	1–2	Brisbane Roar	Canberra
19:30 AEDT	Thorsnes 66'	Report	Yallop 17'; Raso 41'	Stadium: McKellar Park; Attendance: 1,185; Referee: Isabella Blaess

14 December 2019 5	Brisbane Roar	3–2	Adelaide United	Brisbane
16:30 AEST	Riley 4'; Raso 12', 83'	Report	Fowler 25'; Weber 76'	Stadium: Lions Stadium; Attendance: 1,682; Referee: Lara Lee

21 December 2019 6	Melbourne Victory	0–0	Brisbane Roar	Melbourne
10:30 AEDT		Report		Stadium: Epping Stadium; Attendance: 406; Referee: Rachael Mitchenson

29 December 2019 7	Brisbane Roar	2–1	Newcastle Jets	Melbourne
16:00 AEST	Polkinghorne 41'; Palmer 69'	Report	Andrews 22'	Stadium: Lions Stadium; Attendance: 2,189; Referee: Georgia Ghirardello

2 January 2020 8	Brisbane Roar	0–2	Melbourne City	Brisbane
18:30 AEST		Report	Mijatović 6'; Luik 74'	Stadium: Dolphin Stadium; Attendance: 2,693; Referee: Rachael Mitchenson

12 January 2020 9	Western Sydney Wanderers	0–4	Brisbane Roar	Sydney
16:00 AEDT		Report	Toby 50', 70'; Raso 60'; Davidson 68'	Stadium: Marconi Stadium; Attendance: 1,186; Referee: Rebecca Durcau

16 January 2020 10	Sydney FC	0–0	Brisbane Roar	Sydney
19:30 AEDT		Report		Stadium: Leichhardt Oval; Attendance: 1,397; Referee: Kelly Jones

16 February 2020 12	Perth Glory	4–2	Brisbane Roar	Perth
12:30 AWST	Andrews 3', 25' (pen.); Thomas 12'; Norrie 90+3'	Report	Pickett 33'; Yallop 57'	Stadium: Dorrien Gardens; Attendance: 498; Referee: Casey Reibelt

23 February 2020 13	Brisbane Roar	5–0	Canberra United	Brisbane
16:30 AEST	Pickett 11', 82'; Baisden 16' (pen.), 90+2'; Connors 84'	Report		Stadium: Lions Stadium; Attendance: 2,893; Referee: Casey Reibelt

1 March 2020 14	Melbourne City	3–1	Brisbane Roar	Melbourne
16:00 AEDT	Mijatović 34'; Watt 55', 69'	Report	Palmer 49'	Stadium: AAMI Park; Attendance: 4,724; Referee: Rebecca Durcau
