= 2020–21 Brisbane Roar FC (women) season =

13th season in existence of Brisbane Roar (women)

Brisbane Roar (women)
2020–21 season
- Chairman: Rahim Soekasah
- Head Coach: Jake Goodship
- W-League: 2nd
- W-League Finals: Semi-finals
- Highest home attendance: 1,985 vs. Melbourne Victory (4 April 2021); W-League Finals
- Lowest home attendance: 1,079 vs. Canberra United (7 January 2021); W-League
- Average home league attendance: 1,506
- Biggest win: 6–0 vs. Melbourne Victory (H) (22 January 2021); W-League
- Biggest defeat: 2–6 vs. Melbourne Victory (H) (4 April 2021); W-League Finals
| Home colours | Away colours | Third colours |

The 2020–21 season was Brisbane Roar Football Club (women)'s 13th season in the W-League. Brisbane Roar finished 2nd in their W-League season, and finished in the semi-finals of the W-League Finals.

== Players ==
Note: Flags indicate national team as defined under FIFA eligibility rules; some limited exceptions apply. Players may hold more than one non-FIFA nationality.

| No. | Pos. | Nation | Player |
|---|---|---|---|
| 1 | GK | AUS | Georgina Worth |
| 2 | DF | AUS | Kaitlyn Torpey |
| 4 | DF | AUS | Clare Polkinghorne |
| 5 | DF | ENG | Billie Murphy |
| 6 | DF | AUS | Winonah Heatley |
| 7 | DF | AUS | Kim Carroll |
| 8 | FW | BRA | Mariel Hecher |
| 9 | MF | AUS | Rosie Sutton |
| 10 | MF | AUS | Katrina Gorry (on loan from Avaldsnes) |
| 11 | FW | AUS | Sharn Freier |
| 12 | FW | AUS | Larissa Crummer |
| 13 | MF | AUS | Tameka Yallop |

| No. | Pos. | Nation | Player |
|---|---|---|---|
| 14 | MF | AUS | Leticia McKenna |
| 15 | FW | AUS | Emily Gielnik |
| 16 | DF | AUS | Jamilla Rankin |
| 18 | FW | AUS | Sunny Franco |
| 19 | MF | AUS | Rebekah Horsey |
| 20 | DF | AUS | Holly McQueen |
| 21 | GK | AUS | Morgan Aquino |
| 22 | FW | AUS | Anna Margraf |
| 23 | MF | AUS | Isobel Dalton |
| 25 | MF | NZL | Olivia Chance |
| 28 | GK | AUS | Cassandra Zaffina |

== Transfers and contracts ==
=== Transfers in ===
| No. | Position | Player | Transferred from | Type/fee | Date | Ref. |
|---|---|---|---|---|---|---|
| 7 | DF | Kim Carroll | Perth Glory | Free transfer | 2 November 2020 | |
| 14 | MF | Leticia McKenna | Perth Glory | Free transfer | 6 November 2020 | |
| 21 | GK | Morgan Aquino | Perth Glory | Free transfer | 6 November 2020 | |
| 15 | FW | Emily Gielnik | (Sweden) Vittsjö | Free transfer | 10 November 2020 | |
| 5 | DF | (England) Billie Murphy | (Australia) Capalaba | Free transfer | 13 November 2020 | |
| 8 | FW | (Brazil) Mariel Hecher | (Australia) Lions FC | Free transfer | 13 November 2020 | |
| 9 | MF | Rosie Sutton | (Australia) The Gap | Free transfer | 13 November 2020 | |
| 11 | FW | Sharn Freier | Melbourne Victory | Free transfer | 13 November 2020 | |
| 25 | MF | (New Zealand) Olivia Chance | (England) Sheffield United | Free transfer | 23 November 2020 | |
| 23 | MF | Isobel Dalton | (Italy) Napoli | Free transfer | 3 December 2020 | |
| 10 | MF | Katrina Gorry | (Norway) Avaldsnes | Loan | 4 December 2020 | |
| 19 | MF | Rebekah Horsey | (Australia) Mitchelton FC | Free transfer | 16 December 2020 | |
| 12 | FW | Larissa Crummer | Unattached | Free transfer | 1 February 2021 | |
| 28 | GK | Cassandra Zaffina | (Australia) Gold Coast United | Free transfer | 11 February 2021 | |
| 18 | FW | Sunny Franco | Newcastle Jets | Free transfer | 30 March 2021 | |

=== Transfers out ===
| No. | Position | Player | Transferred to | Type/fee | Date | Ref. |
|---|---|---|---|---|---|---|
| 10 | MF | Katrina Gorry | (Norway) Avaldsnes | Free transfer | 28 January 2020 | |
| 5 | FW | (United States) Shea Connors | (Australia) Logan Lightning | Free transfer | March 2020 | |
| 6 | DF | Elise Kellond-Knight | (Sweden) Kristianstads | Free transfer | 20 March 2020 | |
| 2 | DF | (United States) Carson Pickett | (United States) Orlando Pride | Loan return | 23 March 2020 | |
| 15 | DF | Claire Ferrington | (United States) Butler Bulldogs | Free transfer | 14 May 2020 | |
| 1 | GK | Mackenzie Arnold | (England) West Ham United | Free transfer | 9 July 2020 | |
| 7 | FW | Indiah-Paige Riley | (Denmark) Fortuna Hjørring | Free transfer | 3 August 2020 | |
| 3 | MF | (United States) Celeste Boureille | (France) Fleury | Free transfer | 21 August 2020 | |
| 9 | FW | (United States) Rylee Baisden | (United States) North Carolina Courage | Free transfer | 3 September 2020 | |
| 12 | FW | Allira Toby | (Portugal) Famalicão | Free transfer | October 2020 | |
| 10 | MF | Hollie Palmer | Melbourne City | Free transfer | 25 November 2020 | |
| 18 | MF | Leah Davidson | Melbourne City | Free transfer | 26 November 2020 | |
| 11 | DF | Natalie Tathem | Melbourne Victory | Free transfer | 10 December 2020 | |
| 5 | DF | (England) Billie Murphy | Unattached | Free transfer | 16 January 2021 | |
| 4 | DF | Clare Polkinghorne | (Sweden) Vittsjö | Free transfer | 28 March 2021 | |
| 15 | FW | Emily Gielnik | (Sweden) Vittsjö | Free transfer | 28 March 2021 | |

=== Contract extensions ===
| No. | Position | Player | Duration | Date | Ref. |
|---|---|---|---|---|---|
| 13 | MF | Tameka Yallop | 1 year | 4 November 2020 | |
| 1 | GK | Georgina Worth | 1 year | 5 November 2020 | |
| 2 | DF | Kaitlyn Torpey | 1 year | 5 November 2020 | |
| 6 | DF | Winonah Heatley | 1 year | 13 November 2020 | |
| 16 | DF | Jamilla Rankin | 1 year | 13 November 2020 | |
| 22 | FW | Anna Margraf | 1 year | 13 November 2020 | |

== Competitions ==
=== Overall record ===
| Competition | First match | Last match | Starting round | Final position | Record | | | | | | | |
| Competition | First match | Last match | Starting round | Final position | Pld | W | D | L | GF | GA | GD | Win % |
|---|---|---|---|---|---|---|---|---|---|---|---|---|
| W-League | 29 December 2020 | 28 March 2021 | Matchday 1 | 2nd | 12 | 7 | 4 | 1 | 29 | 12 | +17 | 58.33 |
| W-League Finals | 4 April 2021 | | Semi-finals | Semi-finals | 1 | 0 | 0 | 1 | 2 | 6 | −4 | 0.00 |
| Total | | | | | 13 | 7 | 4 | 2 | 31 | 18 | +13 | 53.85 |

Source: Competitions

=== W-League ===
==== League table ====
| Pos | Team | Pld | W | D | L | GF | GA | GD | Pts | Qualification |
|---|---|---|---|---|---|---|---|---|---|---|
| 1 | Sydney FC | 12 | 9 | 1 | 2 | 26 | 11 | +15 | 28 | Qualification to Finals series |
| 2 | Brisbane Roar | 12 | 7 | 4 | 1 | 29 | 12 | +17 | 25 | Qualification to Finals series |
| 3 | Melbourne Victory (C) | 12 | 7 | 2 | 3 | 25 | 14 | +11 | 23 | Qualification to Finals series |
| 4 | Canberra United | 12 | 6 | 4 | 2 | 21 | 16 | +5 | 22 | Qualification to Finals series |
| 5 | Adelaide United | 12 | 7 | 1 | 4 | 22 | 18 | +4 | 22 | |
| 6 | Western Sydney Wanderers | 12 | 4 | 1 | 7 | 13 | 21 | −8 | 13 | |
| 7 | Melbourne City | 12 | 4 | 1 | 7 | 11 | 23 | −12 | 13 | |
| 8 | Newcastle Jets | 12 | 2 | 1 | 9 | 14 | 21 | −7 | 7 | |
| 9 | Perth Glory | 12 | 0 | 1 | 11 | 7 | 32 | −25 | 1 | |

Source: A-Leagues
Rules for classification: 1) points; 2) goal difference; 3) number of goals scored.
(C) Champions

==== Results summary ====
| Overall | | | | | | | | Home | | | | | | Away | | | | | |
| Pld | W | D | L | GF | GA | GD | Pts | W | D | L | GF | GA | GD | W | D | L | GF | GA | GD |
|---|---|---|---|---|---|---|---|---|---|---|---|---|---|---|---|---|---|---|---|
| 12 | 7 | 4 | 1 | 29 | 12 | +17 | 25 | 4 | 2 | 0 | 18 | 3 | +15 | 3 | 2 | 1 | 11 | 9 | +2 |

Source: worldfootball.net

==== Results by round ====
| Round | 11 | 5 | 14 | 1 | 5 | 6 | 8 | 9 | 2 | 11 | 8 | 10 |
|---|---|---|---|---|---|---|---|---|---|---|---|---|
| Ground | H | A | H | A | H | A | A | A | H | A | H | H |
| Result | D | D | D | D | W | W | W | W | W | L | W | W |
| Position | 1 | 4 | 3 | 5 | 3 | 3 | 2 | 2 | 2 | 2 | 2 | 1^{1} |
| Points | 1 | 2 | 3 | 4 | 7 | 10 | 13 | 16 | 19 | 19 | 22 | 25 |

Source: A-Leagues
A = Away; H = Home; W = Win; D = Draw; L = Loss
Notes:
^{1} Brisbane Roar finished their last round at 1st place, but the league season finished with Brisbane Roar in 2nd place.

==== Matches ====
The league fixtures were announced on 30 November 2020.

Win Draw Loss

| 29 December 2020 11 | Brisbane Roar | 0–0 | Melbourne City | Brisbane |
| 15:35 AEST | | Report | | Stadium: Dolphin Stadium; Attendance: 1,174; Referee: Rebecca Durcau |
Note: Match not originally set in fixture draw, but added due to other fixture arrangements.

| 3 January 2021 5 | Melbourne Victory | 0–0 | Brisbane Roar | Melbourne |
| 17:00 AEDT | | Report | | Stadium: Lakeside Stadium; Attendance: 426; Referee: Lara Lee |
Note: Match originally scheduled for 23 January at Lakeside Stadium, but rescheduled due to other fixture arrangements. It was rescheduled for 3 January at CB Smith Reserve.

| 7 January 2021 14 | Brisbane Roar | 1–1 | Canberra United | Brisbane |
| 18:05 AEST | Gorry 3' | Report | Maher 78' | Stadium: Dolphin Stadium; Attendance: 1,079; Referee: Isabella Blaess |
Note: Match originally scheduled for 25 March at 17:00 AEST, but rescheduled due to other fixture arrangements. It was rescheduled for 3 January at 18:05 AEST.

| 17 January 2021 1 | Newcastle Jets | 1–1 | Brisbane Roar | Newcastle |
| 18:40 AEDT | Andrews 16' | Report | Gielnik 54' | Stadium: Newcastle No.2 Sportsground; Attendance: 1,371; Referee: Isabella Libri |
Note: Match originally scheduled for 28 December at 17:00 AEDT, but postponed due to other fixture arrangements. It was rescheduled for 17 January at 18:40 AEDT.

| 22 January 2021 5 | Brisbane Roar | 6–0 | Melbourne Victory | Gold Coast |
| 20:05 AEST | Hecher 26'; Yallop 39'; Freier 64'; Gielnik 76', 90+1'; Heatley 90+5' | Report | | Stadium: Gold Coast Sports Centre; Attendance: 1,455; Referee: Lara Lee |
Note: Match not originally set in fixture draw, but added due to other fixture arrangements.

| 31 January 2021 6 | Melbourne City | 2–3 | Brisbane Roar | Melbourne |
| 16:05 AEDT | Chidiac 46'; Johnson 73' (pen.) | Report | Polkinghorne 23'; Gielnik 31' (pen.); Hecher 75' | Stadium: AAMI Park; Attendance: 1,975; Referee: Casey Reibelt |
Note: Match originally scheduled for 7 March at 19:00 AEDT, but rescheduled for 31 January at 16:05 AEDT.

| 11 February 2021 7 | Western Sydney Wanderers | 1–2 | Brisbane Roar | Sydney |
| 19:05 AEDT | Khamis 14' | Report | Gielnik 16', 32' (pen.) | Stadium: Marconi Stadium; Attendance: 494; Referee: Casey Reibelt |
Note: Match not originally set in fixture draw.

| 14 February 2021 9 | Sydney FC | 1–4 | Brisbane Roar | Sydney |
| 16:05 AEDT | Wheeler 11' | Report | Yallop 8'; Rankin 16'; Polkinghorne 54'; Whyman 82' (o.g.) | Stadium: Leichhardt Oval; Attendance: 1,126; Referee: Lara Lee |
Note: Match originally scheduled for 18 February at 19:00 AEDT, but rescheduled for 14 February at 16:05 AEDT.

| 21 February 2021 2 | Brisbane Roar | 4–0 | Perth Glory | Brisbane |
| 17:05 AEST | Chance 22'; Gielnik 27', 50'; Crummer 87' | Report | | Stadium: Lions Stadium; Attendance: 1,639; Referee: Kelly Jones |
Note: Match originally scheduled for 3 January at 17:00 AEST, but postponed due to other fixture arrangements. It was rescheduled for 21 February at 17:05 AEST.

| 7 March 2021 11 | Canberra United | 4–1 | Brisbane Roar | Canberra |
| 16:05 AEST | Flannery 10'; Maher 23'; Heyman 29'; Galic 64' | Report | Gielnik 44' | Stadium: Viking Park; Attendance: 1,161; Referee: Rebecca Durcau |
Note: Match not originally set in fixture draw.

| 12 March 2021 8 | Brisbane Roar | 4–2 | Adelaide United | Brisbane |
| 20:05 AEST | Hecher 22'; Gielnik 62', 72', 80' | Report | Dawber 34', 87' | Stadium: Lions Stadium; Attendance: 1,791; Referee: Isabella Blaess |
Note: Match originally scheduled for 12 February, but rescheduled for 12 March.

| 28 March 2021 10 | Brisbane Roar | 3–0 | Newcastle Jets | Brisbane |
| 17:05 AEST | Torpey 41'; Gielnik 47'; Hecher 81' | Report | | Stadium: Moreton Daily Stadium; Attendance: 1,895; Referee: Georgia Ghirardello |
Note: Match originally scheduled for 25 February, but rescheduled for 28 March.

==== Finals series ====
| 4 April 2021 Semi-finals | Brisbane Roar | 2–6 | Melbourne Victory | Brisbane |
| 16:00 AEDT | Chance 43'; Yallop 74' | Report | De Vanna 23', 61'; Zimmerman 45'; Ayres 47', 87', 90+6' | Stadium: Lions Stadium; Attendance: 1,985; Referee: Lara Lee |
