= 2021–22 Brisbane Roar FC (women) season =

14th season in existence of Brisbane Roar (women)

Brisbane Roar (women)
2021–22 season
- Chairman: Rahim Soekasah
- Head Coach: Garrath McPherson
- Stadium: Moreton Daily Stadium
- A-League Women: 6th
- A-League Women Finals: DNQ
- Top goalscorer: Larissa Crummer (8)
- Highest home attendance: 2,239 vs. Perth Glory (10 December 2021); A-League Women
- Lowest home attendance: 450 vs. Western Sydney Wanderers (9 January 2022); A-League Women
- Average home league attendance: 1,136
- Biggest win: 5–1 vs. Newcastle Jets (A) (4 March 2022); A-League Women; 4–0 vs. Newcastle Jets (H) (7 March 2022); A-League Women
- Biggest defeat: 2–8 vs. Adelaide United (H) (13 February 2022); A-League Women
Home colours	Away colours	Third colours

The 2021–22 season was Brisbane Roar Football Club (women)'s 14th season in the A-League Women. Brisbane Roar finished 6th in their A-League Women season.

== Players ==
Note: Flags indicate national team as defined under FIFA eligibility rules; some limited exceptions apply. Players may hold more than one non-FIFA nationality.

No.	Pos.	Nation	Player
1	GK	AUS	Georgina Worth
2	FW	AUS	Anna Margraf
3	DF	AUS	Jessie Rasschaert
5	DF	AUS	Jamilla Rankin
6	MF	AUS	Nia Stamatelopoulos
7	MF	AUS	Ayesha Norrie (captain)
8	FW	BRA	Mariel Hecher
9	FW	AUS	Larissa Crummer
10	MF	AUS	Katrina Gorry (vice-captain)
11	DF	AUS	Natalie Tathem
12	FW	USA	Shea Connors
14	MF	JPN	Rie Kitano

No.	Pos.	Nation	Player
15	DF	AUS	Isabella Foletta
18	DF	AUS	Annabel Haffenden
19	MF	AUS	Hollie Palmer
20	MF	AUS	Lanni McDougall
21	GK	AUS	Mia Bailey
22	DF	USA	Cannon Clough
23	FW	AUS	Meaghan McElligott
24	DF	AUS	Ellen Gett
25	GK	AUS	Isabella Shuttleworth
28	DF	AUS	Heidi Dennis
31	MF	AUS	Aleeah Davern
34	GK	AUS	Chantelle Symes

== Transfers and contracts ==
=== Transfers in ===
No.	Position	Player	Transferred from	Type/fee	Date	Ref.
12	FW	(United States) Shea Connors	(Australia) Lions FC	Free transfer	24 August 2021	
19	MF	Hollie Palmer	Melbourne City	Free transfer	25 August 2021	
7	MF	Ayesha Norrie	(Australia) Gold Coast United	Free transfer	3 September 2021	
14	MF	(Japan) Rie Kitano	(Australia) Souths United	Free transfer	7 September 2021	
21	GK	Mia Bailey	(Australia) Queensland Academy of Sport	Free transfer	24 September 2021	
22	DF	(United States) Cannon Clough	(Australia) Lions FC	Free transfer	29 September 2021	
20	MF	Lanni McDougall	(Australia) Moreton Bay United	Free transfer	1 October 2021	
23	FW	Meaghan McElligott	(Australia) Western Pride	Free transfer	5 October 2021	
3	DF	Jessie Rasschaert	Canberra United	Free transfer	8 October 2021	
18	DF	Annabel Haffenden	(Australia) Alamein United	Free transfer	13 October 2021	
11	DF	Natalie Tathem	Melbourne Victory	Free transfer	1 November 2021	
6	MF	Nia Stamatelopoulos	(Australia) Alamein	Free transfer	2 December 2021	
24	DF	Ellen Gett	(Australia) Queensland Academy of Sport	Free transfer	3 December 2021	
15	DF	Isabella Foletta	(Italy) Lazio	Free transfer	10 December 2021	
25	GK	Isabella Shuttleworth	(Australia) Lions FC	Free transfer	17 December 2021	
28	DF	Heidi Dennis	(Australia) Queensland Academy of Sport	Free transfer	17 December 2021	
31	MF	Aleeah Davern	(Australia) Queensland Academy of Sport	Free transfer	2 February 2022	
34	GK	Chantelle Symes	Unattached	Free transfer	17 February 2022	

=== Transfers out ===
No.	Position	Player	Transferred to	Type/fee	Date	Ref.
19	MF	(United States) Mallory Weber	(Australia) Sunshine Coast Wanderers	Free transfer	31 March 2021	
11	FW	Sharn Freier	(Australia) Moreton Bay United	Free transfer	28 April 2021	
13	MF	Tameka Yallop	(England) West Ham United	Free transfer	10 May 2021	
21	GK	Morgan Aquino	Perth Glory	Free transfer	20 May 2021	
7	DF	Kim Carroll	Perth Glory	Free transfer	15 June 2021	
6	DF	Winonah Heatley	(Sweden) Växjö	Free transfer	29 July 2021	
23	MF	Isobel Dalton	(England) Lewes	Free transfer	30 July 2021	
25	MF	(New Zealand) Olivia Chance	(Scotland) Celtic	Free transfer	14 August 2021	
18	FW	Sunny Franco	Newcastle Jets	Free transfer	20 August 2021	
2	DF	Kaitlyn Torpey	Melbourne City	Free transfer	9 September 2021	
14	MF	Leticia McKenna	Melbourne City	Free transfer	30 September 2021	
28	GK	Cassandra Zaffina	(Australia) Gold Coast United	Free transfer	14 October 2021	
9	MF	Rosie Sutton	(Australia) Olympic FC	Free transfer	27 December 2021	

=== Contract extensions ===
No.	Position	Player	Duration	Date	Ref.
5	DF	Jamilla Rankin	1 year	19 August 2021	
8	FW	(Brazil) Mariel Hecher	1 year	20 August 2021	
—	DF	Holly McQueen	1 year	21 August 2021	
1	GK	Georgina Worth	1 year	26 August 2021	
9	FW	Larissa Crummer	1 year	27 August 2021	
2	FW	Anna Margraf	1 year	28 August 2021	

== Pre-season and friendlies ==
Win Draw Loss

13 November 2021	NPL All-Stars (Australia)	2–1	(Australia) Brisbane Roar	Brisbane, Australia
14:00 AEDT	Riding 20'; Gunston 80'	Report	Connors 18'	Stadium: Perry Park

== Competitions ==
=== Overall record ===
Competition	First match	Last match	Starting round	Final position	Record							
Competition	First match	Last match	Starting round	Final position	Pld	W	D	L	GF	GA	GD	Win %
A-League Women	4 December 2021	10 March 2022	Matchday 1	6th	14	5	2	7	29	30	−1	35.71
Total					14	5	2	7	29	30	−1	35.71

Source: Competitions

=== A-League Women ===
==== League table ====
Pos	Team	Pld	W	D	L	GF	GA	GD	Pts	Qualification
1	Sydney FC	14	11	2	1	36	6	+30	35	Qualification to Finals series
2	Melbourne City	14	11	0	3	29	11	+18	33	Qualification to Finals series
3	Adelaide United	14	9	0	5	33	18	+15	27	Qualification to Finals series
4	Melbourne Victory (C)	14	7	3	4	26	22	+4	24	Qualification to Finals series
5	Perth Glory	14	7	3	4	20	23	−3	24	
6	Brisbane Roar	14	5	2	7	29	30	−1	17	
7	Canberra United	14	2	7	5	24	29	−5	13	
8	Newcastle Jets	14	2	4	8	15	30	−15	10	
9	Western Sydney Wanderers	14	1	4	9	7	27	−20	7	
10	Wellington Phoenix	14	2	1	11	13	36	−23	7	

Source: A-Leagues
Rules for classification: 1) points; 2) goal difference; 3) number of goals scored.
(C) Champions

==== Results summary ====
Overall								Home						Away					
Pld	W	D	L	GF	GA	GD	Pts	W	D	L	GF	GA	GD	W	D	L	GF	GA	GD
14	5	2	7	29	30	−1	17	1	1	5	12	18	−6	4	1	2	17	12	+5

Source: worldfootball.net

==== Results by round ====
Round	1	2	3	4	5	6	7	9	10	11	13	14	8	12
Ground	A	H	H	A	A	H	A	H	A	H	A	A	H	H
Result	L	L	L	D	W	L	W	L	L	L	W	W	W	D
Position	7	10	10	9	7	8	7	7	7	7	8	6	6	6
Points	0	0	0	1	4	4	7	7	7	7	10	13	16	17

Source: A-Leagues
A = Away; H = Home; W = Win; D = Draw; L = Loss

==== Matches ====
The first four rounds of the league fixtures were announced on 23 September 2021. The rest were announced on 9 November 2021.

Win Draw Loss

4 December 2021 1	Perth Glory	2–1	Brisbane Roar	Perth
19:05 AWST	Phonsongkham 88'; Worth 90' (o.g.)	Report	Margraf 22'	Stadium: Macedonia Park; Attendance: 830; Referee: Rebecca Durcau

10 December 2021 2	Brisbane Roar	0–1	Perth Glory	Brisbane
18:45 AEST		Report	Jancevski 86'	Stadium: Perry Park; Attendance: 2,239; Referee: Rachael Mitchenson
Note: Match originally set to play at Gold Coast Croatian Sports Centre, but relocated due to heavy rainfalls across South East Queensland. It was relocated to Perry Park.

18 December 2021 3	Brisbane Roar	2–3	Melbourne Victory	Brisbane
16:05 AEST	Connors 65'; Crummer 90+4'	Report	Williams 36'; Withers 46'; Zimmerman 85'	Stadium: Moreton Daily Stadium; Attendance: 1,258; Referee: Lara Lee

23 December 2021 4	Canberra United	3–3	Brisbane Roar	Canberra
17:05 AEDT	Heyman 10'; Maher 87'; Caspers 90+3'	Report	Roestbakken 23' (o.g.); Connors 38'; Margraf 64'	Stadium: Viking Park; Attendance: 957; Referee: Rachael Mitchenson

2 January 2022 5	Melbourne Victory	2–4	Brisbane Roar	Melbourne
16:05 AEDT	Rasschaert 6' (o.g.); Williams 26'	Report	Crummer 59'; Gorry 86'; Connors 90'; Norire 90+6'	Stadium: AAMI Park; Attendance: 605; Referee: Isabella Blaess

9 January 2022 6	Brisbane Roar	0–1	Western Sydney Wanderers	Brisbane
15:05 AEST		Report	Henry 65' (pen.)	Stadium: Moreton Daily Stadium; Attendance: 450; Referee: Lara Lee

16 January 2022 7	Wellington Phoenix	2–3	Brisbane Roar	Wollongong
16:05 AEDT	Whinham 19'; Jale 24'	Report	Hecher 34'; Crummer 46'; Gorry 87' (pen.)	Stadium: WIN Stadium; Attendance: 247; Referee: Rebecca Mackie

29 January 2022 9	Brisbane Roar	1–2	Melbourne City	Brisbane
16:05 AEST	Gorry 71' (pen.)	Report	Pollicina 79'; Wilkinson 90+4'	Stadium: Moreton Daily Stadium; Attendance: 1,132; Referee: Rebecca Mackie

2 February 2022 10	Sydney FC	2–0	Brisbane Roar	Sydney
19:35 AEDT	Rojas 5'; Rue 49'	Report		Stadium: Leichhardt Oval; Attendance: 501; Referee: Georgia Ghirardello

13 February 2022 11	Brisbane Roar	2–8	Adelaide United	Brisbane
15:05 AEST	Connors 59', 80'	Report	Dawber 13'; Palmer 23' (o.g.); Worts 33', 43', 57', 64', 74'; McNamara 55'	Stadium: Moreton Daily Stadium; Attendance: 1,000; Referee: Rachael Mitchenson

24 February 2022 13	Melbourne City	0–1	Brisbane Roar	Melbourne
19:45 AEDT		Report	Hecher 26'	Stadium: Kingston Heath Soccer Complex; Attendance: 857; Referee: Kelly Jones

4 March 2022 14	Newcastle Jets	1–5	Brisbane Roar	Newcastle
19:45 AEDT	Allan 63'	Report	Margraf 17'; Crummer 29', 55', 57'; Palmer 71'	Stadium: No.2 Sportsground; Attendance: 1,156; Referee: Kelly Jones

7 March 2022 8	Brisbane Roar	4–0	Newcastle Jets	Brisbane
16:15 AEST	Gorry 4'; Crummer 13'; Connors 29', 38'	Report		Stadium: James Drysdale Reserve; Attendance: 1,000; Referee: Caitlin Williams
Note: Match originally scheduled for 23 January at Moreton Daily Stadium, but postponed due to positive COVID-19 cases within Brisbane Roar. It was rescheduled for 7 March at Perry Park. Match then relocated due to Perry Park's insufficient recovery. It was relocated to James Drysdale Reserve.

10 March 2022 12	Brisbane Roar	3–3	Canberra United	Brisbane
16:05 AEST	Crummer 13'; Norrie 64'; McElligott 90'	Report	Heyman 67', 72', 88'	Stadium: James Drysdale Reserve; Attendance: 875; Referee: Rebecca Mackie
Note: Match originally set for 18 February at Gold Coast Croatian Sports Centre was postponed due to waterlogged pitch. It was rescheduled for 28 February. Match then postponed again due to ongoing extreme weather in South East Queensland. It was then rescheduled for 10 March at Perry Park. Match then relocated due to Perry Park's insufficient recovery. It was relocated to James Drysdale Reserve.

== Statistics ==
=== Appearances and goals ===
Includes all competitions. Players with no appearances not included in the list.

No.	Pos	Nat	Player	Total		A-League Women	
No.	Pos	Nat	Player	Apps	Goals	Apps	Goals
1	GK	(Australia) AUS	Georgina Worth	6	0	6	0
2	FW	(Australia) AUS	Anna Margraf	14	3	12+2	3
3	DF	(Australia) AUS	Jessie Rasschaert	14	0	11+3	0
5	DF	(Australia) AUS	Jamilla Rankin	14	0	14	0
6	MF	(Australia) AUS	Nia Stamatelopoulos	4	0	1+3	0
7	MF	(Australia) AUS	Ayesha Norrie	13	2	13	2
8	FW	(Brazil) BRA	Mariel Hecher	13	2	13	2
9	FW	(Australia) AUS	Larissa Crummer	14	8	14	8
10	MF	(Australia) AUS	Katrina Gorry	14	4	12+2	4
11	DF	(Australia) AUS	Natalie Tathem	8	0	5+3	0
12	FW	(United States) USA	Shea Connors	13	7	13	7
14	MF	(Japan) JPN	Rie Kitano	13	0	6+7	0
15	DF	(Australia) AUS	Isabella Foletta	3	0	1+2	0
18	DF	(Australia) AUS	Annabel Haffendan	13	0	12+1	0
19	MF	(Australia) AUS	Hollie Palmer	8	1	4+4	1
20	MF	(Australia) AUS	Lanni McDougall	2	0	1+1	0
21	GK	(Australia) AUS	Mia Bailey	4	0	4	0
22	DF	(United States) USA	Cannon Clough	11	0	7+4	0
23	FW	(Australia) AUS	Meaghan McElligott	8	1	1+7	1
24	DF	(Australia) AUS	Ellen Gett	2	0	0+2	0
25	GK	(Australia) AUS	Isabella Shuttleworth	5	0	4+1	0
31	MF	(Australia) AUS	Aleeah Davern	2	0	0+2	0

- Source: Soccerway

=== Disciplinary record ===
Includes all competitions. The list is sorted by squad number when total cards are equal. Players with no cards not included in the list.

No.	Pos	Nat	Player	Total			A-League Women		
No.	Pos	Nat	Player	Yellow card	Second yellow card	Red card	Yellow card	Second yellow card	Red card
18	DF	(Australia) AUS	Annabel Haffendan	0	0	1	0	0	1
12	FW	(United States) USA	Shea Connors	4	0	0	4	0	0
3	DF	(Australia) AUS	Jessie Rasschaert	2	0	0	2	0	0
7	MF	(Australia) AUS	Ayesha Norrie	2	0	0	2	0	0
8	FW	(Brazil) BRA	Mariel Hecher	2	0	0	2	0	0
11	DF	(Australia) AUS	Natalie Tathem	2	0	0	2	0	0
9	FW	(Australia) AUS	Larissa Crummer	1	0	0	1	0	0
14	MF	(Japan) JPN	Rie Kitano	1	0	0	1	0	0
22	DF	(United States) USA	Cannon Clough	1	0	0	1	0	0

- Source: Soccerway
- (yellow card) = Number of bookings; (second yellow card) = Number of sending offs after a second yellow card; (red card) = Number of sending offs by a direct red card.
