= 2021–22 Newcastle Jets FC (women) season =

Newcastle Jets
2021–22 season
- Chairman: Shane Mattiske
- Manager: Ash Wilson
- Stadium: McDonald Jones Stadium, No.2 Sportsground
- A-League Women: 8th of 10
- Top goalscorer: Tara Andrews (2 goals) Marie Dølvik Markussen (2 goals) Sophie Harding (2 goals)
Home colours	Away colours	Third colours

The 2021–22 season was Newcastle Jets' 14th season since its establishment in 2008. The club participated in the A-League Women (formerly the W-League).

== Squad ==
As of 17 February 2022

Note: Flags indicate national team as defined under FIFA eligibility rules; some limited exceptions apply. Players may hold more than one non-FIFA nationality.

No.	Pos.	Nation	Player
2	DF	AUS	Hannah Brewer
3	FW	AUS	Jemma House
5	DF	AUS	Tiana Jaber
6	MF	AUS	Cassidy Davis (co-captain)
7	MF	AUS	Gema Simon (co-captain)
8	MF	USA	Elizabeth Eddy (on loan from NJ/NY Gotham)
9	FW	AUS	Tara Andrews
12	DF	AUS	Kirsty Fenton
13	FW	AUS	Lauren Allan
14	MF	AUS	Lucy Johnson

No.	Pos.	Nation	Player
15	FW	AUS	Sophie Harding
16	MF	AUS	Sunny Franco
17	FW	NOR	Marie Markussen
18	DF	AUS	Taren King
19	FW	AUS	Ashlee Brodigan
20	GK	AUS	Claire Coelho
24	MF	AUS	Josie Morley (scholarship)
25	MF	AUS	Lara Gooch (scholarship)
32	MF	AUS	Bethany Gordon
-	GK	AUS	Sophie Magus

== Transfers ==
=== Transfers in ===
Date	Player	Moving From	Transfer Window	Source
20 August 2021	Sunny Franco	Brisbane Roar	Pre-season	
2 September 2021	Lucy Johnson	South Melbourne	Pre-season	
7 October 2021	Georgia Boric	Sydney University	Pre-season	
2 November 2021	(Norway) Marie Markussen	(Norway) Vålerenga	Pre-season	
12 November 2021	Bethany Gordon	(Denmark) AaB	Pre-season	
24 November 2021	Ash Brodigan	NWS Koalas	Pre-season	
1 December 2021	(United States) Elizabeth Eddy	(United States) NJ/NY Gotham (Loan)	Pre-season	
7 December 2021	Emily van Egmond	(United States) Orlando Pride	Mid-season	

=== Transfers out ===
Date	Player	Moving to	Transfer Window	Source
2 July 2021	Tessa Tamplin	(Switzerland) Servette	Pre-season	
16 July 2021	Evelyn Chronis	Northbridge Bulls	Pre-season	
1 September 2021	Rhianna Pollicina	Melbourne City	Pre-season	
2 December 2021	Alisha Bass	Unattached	Pre-season	
2 December 2021	Chloe O'Brien	Unattached	Pre-season	
2 December 2021	Panagiota Petratos	Unattached	Pre-season	
2 December 2021	Nicole Simonsen	Unattached	Pre-season	
8 January 2022	Emily Van Egmond	(United States) Orlando Pride	Mid-season	

== A-League Women ==
=== League table ===
Pos	Team	Pld	W	D	L	GF	GA	GD	Pts	Qualification
1	Sydney FC	14	11	2	1	36	6	+30	35	Qualification to Finals series
2	Melbourne City	14	11	0	3	29	11	+18	33	Qualification to Finals series
3	Adelaide United	14	9	0	5	33	18	+15	27	Qualification to Finals series
4	Melbourne Victory (C)	14	7	3	4	26	22	+4	24	Qualification to Finals series
5	Perth Glory	14	7	3	4	20	23	−3	24	
6	Brisbane Roar	14	5	2	7	29	30	−1	17	
7	Canberra United	14	2	7	5	24	29	−5	13	
8	Newcastle Jets	14	2	4	8	15	30	−15	10	
9	Western Sydney Wanderers	14	1	4	9	7	27	−20	7	
10	Wellington Phoenix	14	2	1	11	13	36	−23	7	

Source: A-Leagues
Rules for classification: 1) points; 2) goal difference; 3) number of goals scored.
(C) Champions

=== Results summary ===
Overall								Home						Away					
Pld	W	D	L	GF	GA	GD	Pts	W	D	L	GF	GA	GD	W	D	L	GF	GA	GD
9	2	3	4	12	14	−2	9	1	2	2	9	7	+2	1	1	2	3	7	−4

Last updated: 13 February 2022.
Source: Competitive Matches

==== Results by round ====
Round	1	2	3	4	7	9	10	6	11	12	13	5	14	8
Ground	A	H	A	A	H	H	A	H	H	H	A	A	H	A
Result	L	W	D	W	D	D	L	L	L	D	L	L	L	L
Position	9	4	5	4	5	6	6	6	6	6	7	7	8	8
Points	0	3	4	7	8	9	9	9	9	10	10	10	10	10

Source: A-Leagues
A = Away; H = Home; W = Win; D = Draw; L = Loss

=== Matches ===
Win Draw Loss

- All times are in AEDT

4 December 2021 1	Sydney FC	3–1	Newcastle Jets	Sydney
17:05	Siemsen 52'; Ibini 58'; Vine 69'	Report	Allan 67'	Stadium: Netstrata Jubilee Stadium; Attendance: 1,997; Referee: Rebecca Mackie

10 December 2021 2	Newcastle Jets	5–1	Wellington Phoenix	Newcastle
17:05	Fenton 33'; Markussen 55'; Andrews 61', 62'; Harding 73'	Report	Pritchard 81'	Stadium: McDonald Jones Stadium; Attendance: 2,273; Referee: Isabella Blaess

17 December 2021 3	Western Sydney Wanderers	1–1	Newcastle Jets	Sydney
17:05	Crofts 90'	Report	Jaber 21'	Stadium: Wanderers Football Park; Attendance: 496; Referee: Casey Reibelt

27 December 2021 4	Wellington Phoenix	0–1	Newcastle Jets	Gosford
18:45		Report	House 82'	Stadium: Central Coast Stadium; Attendance: 0 (behind closed doors); Referee: Georgia Ghirardello

16 January 2022 7	Newcastle Jets	1–1	Perth Glory	Newcastle
18:45	Eddy 77'	Report	Lowry 54'	Stadium: No. 2 Sportsground; Attendance: 713; Referee: Caitlin Williams

30 January 2022 9	Newcastle Jets	3–3	Canberra United	Newcastle
16:05	Markussen 1'; Harding 51'; Franco 63'	Report	Sykes 18', 60'; Toby 62'	Stadium: McDonald Jones Stadium; Attendance: 2,546; Referee: Georgia Ghirardello

6 February 2022 10	Adelaide United	3–0	Newcastle Jets	Adelaide
16:05	Worts 24', 76'; Dawber 80' (pen.)	Report		Stadium: Coopers Stadium; Attendance: 2,032; Referee: Rebecca Mackie

8 February 2022 6	Newcastle Jets	0–1	Melbourne Victory	Newcastle
17:25		Report	Hendrix 55'	Stadium: McDonald Jones Stadium; Attendance: 1,135; Referee: Kelly Jones

13 February 2022 11	Newcastle Jets	0–1	Sydney FC	Newcastle
18:15		Report	Ibini 22'	Stadium: No. 2 Sportsground; Attendance: 583; Referee: Georgia Ghirardello

19 February 2022 12	Newcastle Jets	2–2	Western Sydney Wanderers	Newcastle
17:05	Eddy 59' (pen.); Brodigan 90+2'	Report	Crofts 40'; Apostolakis 76'	Stadium: No. 2 Sportsground; Attendance: 1,014; Referee: Lara Lee

25 February 2022 13	Canberra United	3–0	Newcastle Jets	Canberra
17:25	Toby 11'; Heyman 29', 45+1'	Report		Stadium: Viking Park; Attendance: 753; Referee: Georgia Ghirardello

1 March 2022 5	Melbourne City	2–0	Newcastle Jets	Broadmeadows
19:05	Torpey 16'; Wilkinson 49'	Report		Stadium: ABD Stadium; Attendance: 357; Referee: Caitlin Williams

4 March 2022 14	Newcastle Jets	1–5	Brisbane Roar	Newcastle
19:45	Allan 63'	Report	Margraf 17'; Crummer 29', 55', 57'; Palmer 71'	Stadium: No. 2 Sportsground; Attendance: 1,156; Referee: Kelly Jones

7 March 2022 8	Brisbane Roar	4–0	Newcastle Jets	Brisbane
16:15	Gorry 4'; Crummer 13'; Coelho 29' (o.g.); Connors 38'	Report		Stadium: James Drysdale Reserve 1 Attendance: 1,000; Referee: Caitlin Williams

== Club awards ==
=== Newcastle Jets Player of the Month award ===
Awarded monthly to the player that was chosen by supporters voting online.

Month	Player	Ref
November/December	(Australia) Emily Van Egmond	

== See also ==
- 2021–22 Newcastle Jets FC season
