= 2020–21 Perth Glory FC (women) season =

13th season in existence of Perth Glory FC (women)

Perth Glory (women)
2020–21 season
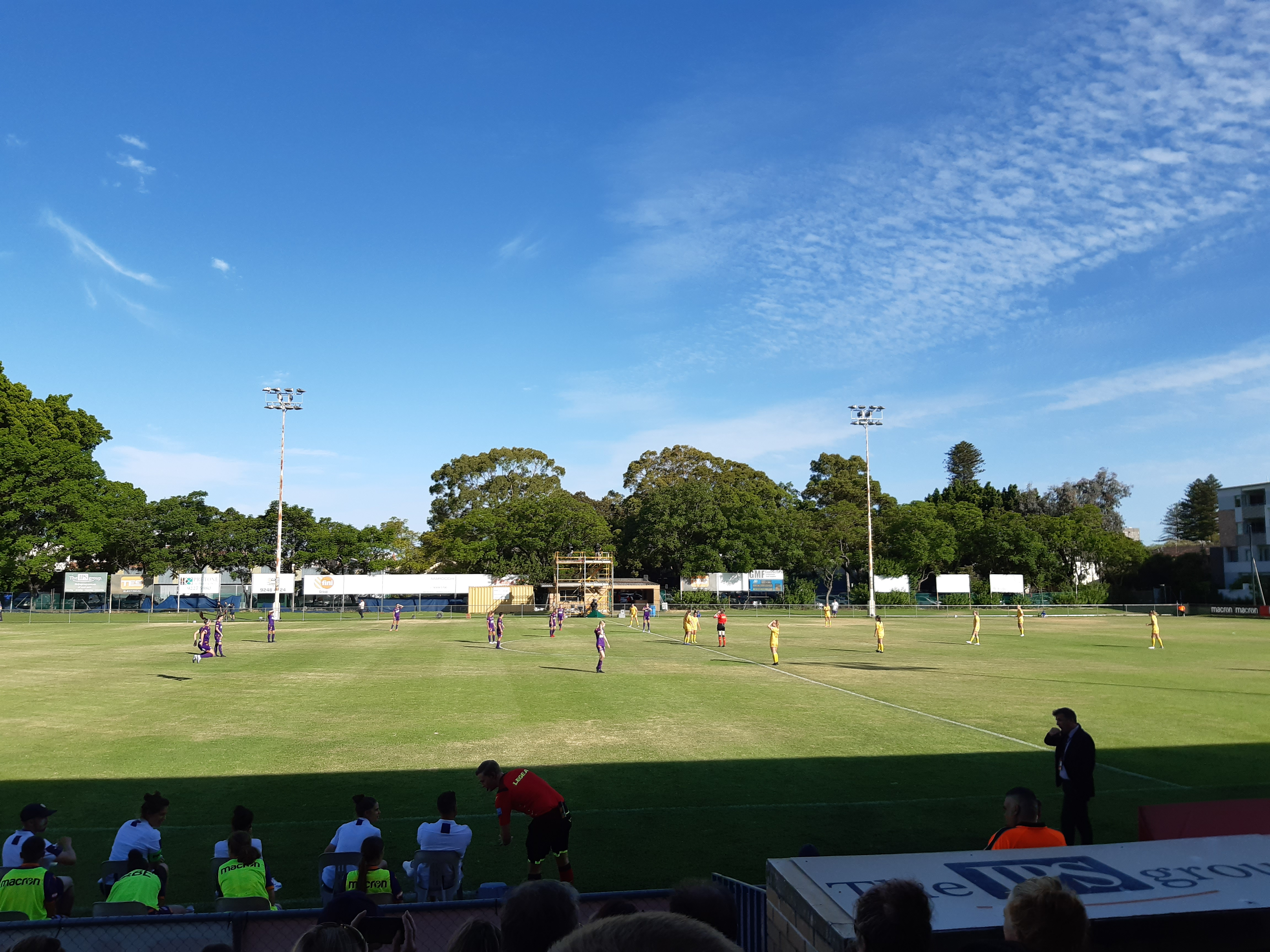
- Perth Glory playing against Adelaide United in January 2021
- Chairman: Tony Sage
- Head Coach: Alex Epakis
- Stadium: Dorrien Gardens
- W-League: 9th
- W-League Finals: DNQ
- Top goalscorer: Caitlin Doeglas; Hana Lowry (2 each)
- Highest home attendance: 942 vs. Canberra United (12 March 2021); W-League
- Lowest home attendance: 250 vs. Melbourne Victory (16 March 2021); W-League
- Average home league attendance: 493
- Biggest defeat: 0–6 vs. Melbourne Victory (A) (28 March 2021); W-League
Home colours	Away colours

The 2020–21 season was Perth Glory Football Club (women)'s 13th season in the W-League. Coached by Alex Epakis, Perth Glory finished 9th in their W-League season.

== Players ==
=== First-team squad ===
Note: Flags indicate national team as defined under FIFA eligibility rules; some limited exceptions apply. Players may hold more than one non-FIFA nationality.

No.	Pos.	Nation	Player
1	GK	NZL	Lily Alfield
2	DF	AUS	Sarah Carroll
3	FW	ENG	Gemma Craine
4	DF	AUS	Natasha Rigby
5	DF	IRL	Deborah-Anne De la Harpe
6	DF	AUS	Tijan McKenna
7	DF	NZL	Elizabeth Anton
8	MF	AUS	Hana Lowry
9	MF	NZL	Malia Steinmetz
10	MF	AUS	Lexie Moreno

No.	Pos.	Nation	Player
11	FW	AUS	Patricia Charalambous
12	MF	AUS	Sarah Morgan
13	DF	AUS	Jamie-Lee Gale
14	MF	AUS	Caitlin Doeglas
15	FW	AUS	Abbey Green
17	FW	AUS	Marianna Tabain
18	FW	AUS	Taneesha Baker
20	GK	AUS	Rebecca Bennett
23	FW	AUS	Katarina Jukic
31	DF	AUS	Isabella Wallhead

== Transfers and contracts ==
=== Transfers in ===
No.	Position	Player	Transferred from	Type/fee	Date	Ref.
11	FW	Patricia Charalambous	Canberra United	Free transfer	26 November 2020	
17	FW	Marianna Tabain	(Croatia) Split	Free transfer	9 December 2020	
5	DF	(Republic of Ireland) Deborah-Anne De la Harpe	(Australia) APIA Leichhardt	Free transfer	10 December 2020	
12	MF	Sarah Morgan	(Australia) Sydney University	Free transfer	10 December 2020	
1	GK	(New Zealand) Lily Alfeld	(New Zealand) Auckland Football Federation	Free transfer	11 December 2020	
7	DF	(New Zealand) Elizabeth Anton	(New Zealand) Auckland Football Federation	Free transfer	11 December 2020	
9	MF	(New Zealand) Malia Steinmetz	(New Zealand) Northern Lights	Free transfer	11 December 2020	
3	FW	(England) Gemma Craine	(Australia) Fremantle City	Free transfer	22 December 2020	
6	DF	Tijan McKenna	(Australia) Football West NTC	Free transfer	22 December 2020	
20	GK	Rebecca Bennett	(Australia) Perth SC	Free transfer	22 December 2020	

=== Transfers out ===
No.	Position	Player	Transferred to	Type/fee	Date	Ref.
8	MF	(United States) Morgan Andrews	(United States) OL Reign	Loan return	5 March 2020	
9	FW	(United States) Crystal Thomas	(United States) Washington Spirit	Loan return	9 March 2020	
7	DF	(Spain) Celia	(United States) OL Reign	Loan return	6 July 2020	
4	MF	Ayesha Norrie	(Australia) Gold Coast United	Free transfer	25 July 2020	
12	DF	Jenna Onions	(Australia) Perth SC	Free transfer	16 August 2020	
17	FW	Liana Cook	(Australia) Perth SC	Free transfer	16 August 2020	
6	MF	(Mexico) Arianna Romero	(United States) North Carolina Courage	Free transfer	6 September 2020	
18	DF	Isabella Foletta	Canberra United	Free transfer	23 October 2020	
3	DF	Kim Carroll	Brisbane Roar	Free transfer	2 November 2020	
11	MF	Leticia McKenna	Brisbane Roar	Free transfer	6 November 2020	
21	GK	Morgan Aquino	Brisbane Roar	Free transfer	6 November 2020	
10	DF	Julia Sardo	Melbourne City	Free transfer	27 November 2020	
5	MF	Shannon May	Unattached	Free transfer	30 November 2020	
1	GK	Eliza Campbell	Unattached	Sydney FC	19 March 2021	

=== Contract extensions ===
No.	Position	Player	Duration	Date	Ref.
4	DF	Natasha Rigby	1 year	25 November 2020	
2	DF	Sarah Carroll	1 year	26 November 2020	
13	DF	Jamie-Lee Gale	1 year	26 November 2020	
14	DF	Caitlin Doeglas	1 year	26 November 2020	
8	MF	Hana Lowry	1 year	1 December 2020	
10	MF	Lexie Moreno	1 year	1 December 2020	
15	FW	Abbey Green	1 year	1 December 2020	
31	DF	Isabella Wallhead	1 year	1 December 2020	
23	FW	Katarina Jukic	1 year	9 December 2020	

== Competitions ==
=== Overall record ===
Competition	First match	Last match	Starting round	Final position	Record							
Competition	First match	Last match	Starting round	Final position	Pld	W	D	L	GF	GA	GD	Win %
W-League	9 January 2021	28 March 2021	Matchday 1	9th	12	0	1	11	7	32	−25	0.00
Total					12	0	1	11	7	32	−25	0.00

Source: Soccerway

=== W-League ===
==== League table ====
Pos	Team	Pld	W	D	L	GF	GA	GD	Pts	Qualification
1	Sydney FC	12	9	1	2	26	11	+15	28	Qualification to Finals series
2	Brisbane Roar	12	7	4	1	29	12	+17	25	Qualification to Finals series
3	Melbourne Victory (C)	12	7	2	3	25	14	+11	23	Qualification to Finals series
4	Canberra United	12	6	4	2	21	16	+5	22	Qualification to Finals series
5	Adelaide United	12	7	1	4	22	18	+4	22	
6	Western Sydney Wanderers	12	4	1	7	13	21	−8	13	
7	Melbourne City	12	4	1	7	11	23	−12	13	
8	Newcastle Jets	12	2	1	9	14	21	−7	7	
9	Perth Glory	12	0	1	11	7	32	−25	1	

Source: A-Leagues
Rules for classification: 1) points; 2) goal difference; 3) number of goals scored.
(C) Champions

==== Results summary ====
Overall								Home						Away					
Pld	W	D	L	GF	GA	GD	Pts	W	D	L	GF	GA	GD	W	D	L	GF	GA	GD
12	0	1	11	7	32	−25	1	0	0	6	5	17	−12	0	1	5	2	15	−13

Source: A-Leagues

==== Results by round ====
Round	3	11	5	14	2	10	3	1	9	5	7	4
Ground	A	H	A	A	A	H	H	H	H	H	A	A
Result	L	L	D	L	L	L	L	L	L	L	L	L
Position	8	9	9	9	9	9	9	9	9	9	9	9
Points	0	0	1	1	1	1	1	1	1	1	1	1

Source: A-Leagues
A = Away; H = Home; B = Bye; W = Win; D = Draw; L = Loss

==== Matches ====
The league fixtures were announced on 30 November 2020.

Win Draw Loss

9 January 2021 3	Adelaide United	1–0	Perth Glory	Adelaide
18:35 ACDT	Condon 80' (pen.)	Report		Stadium: Marden Sports Complex; Attendance: 1,074; Referee: Georgia Ghirardello
Note: Match not originally set in fixture draw, but added due to the postponement of Round 1's match against Canberra United at home.

14 January 2021 11	Perth Glory	1–2	Adelaide United	Perth
17:05 AWST	Doeglas 53'	Report	Worts 6'; Condon 74'	Stadium: Dorrien Gardens; Attendance: 673; Referee: Georgia Ghirardello
Note: Match originally scheduled for 6 March at 18:00 AWST, but rescheduled to 14 January at 17:05 AWST.

24 January 2021 5	Canberra United	1–1	Perth Glory	Canberra
16:05 AEDT	Taylor-Young 87'	Report	Anton 86'	Stadium: Viking Park; Attendance: 1,041; Referee: Rebecca Durcau
Note: Match originally set to play Melbourne City at home, but scrapped. It was replaced by Canberra United away.

18 February 2021 14	Western Sydney Wanderers	1–0	Perth Glory	Sydney
19:10 AEDT	Russell 45'	Report		Stadium: Marconi Stadium; Attendance: 413; Referee: Rachael Mitchenson
Note: Match originally scheduled for 27 March at 15:00 AEDT at Wanderers Centre of Football, but rescheduled to 18 February at 19:10 AEDT at Marconi Stadium.

21 February 2021 2	Brisbane Roar	4–0	Perth Glory	Brisbane
18:05 AEST	Chance 22'; Gielnik 27', 50'; Crummer 87'	Report		Stadium: Lions Stadium; Attendance: 1,639; Referee: Kelly Jones
Note: Match originally scheduled for 3 January at 17:00 AEST, but rescheduled to 21 February at 18:05 AEST due to fixture arrangements.

25 February 2021 10	Perth Glory	2–6	Sydney FC	Perth
18:35 AWST	Lowry 63', 65'	Report	Siemsen 44', 53'; Ibini-Isei 48', 90+5'; Wheeler 61', 71'	Stadium: Dorrien Gardens; Attendance: 510; Referee: Isabella Libri

8 March 2021 3	Perth Glory	0–4	Newcastle Jets	Perth
18:35 AWST		Report	Pollicina 29'; Franco 36', 47'; Allan 83'	Stadium: Dorrien Gardens; Attendance: 310; Referee: Rachael Mitchenson
Note: Match originally scheduled for 10 January at 17:00 AWST, but rescheduled to 8 March at 18:35 AWST due to fixture arrangements.

12 March 2021 1	Perth Glory	2–3	Canberra United	Canberra
18:05 AEDT	Doeglas 41'; Jukic 71'	Report	Flannery 36'; Heyman 54', 90+5'	Stadium: Viking Park; Attendance: 942; Referee: Lara Lee
Note: Match initially set to play Canberra United at home at Dorrien Gardens on 29 December at 18:00 AWST, but scrapped due to COVID-19 outbreaks in New South Wales. It was replaced by Melbourne Victory at home on 2 January at 18:05 AWST. Match then postponed and presumably reverted to Canberra United at home, scheduled for 30 January at 18:05 AWST. Match was postponed again and rescheduled for 11 March at 18:35 AWST. Match was then changed to take place at Viking Park on 12 March at 18:05 AEDT.

16 March 2021 9	Perth Glory	0–1	Melbourne Victory	Perth
18:35 AWST		Report	Longo 62'	Stadium: Dorrien Gardens; Attendance: 250; Referee: Rebecca Durcau
Note: Match originally scheduled for 20 February at 18:00 AWST, but rescheduled to 14 February at 18:05 AWST. Match then postponed and rescheduled to 14 March. Match again rescheduled to 16 March at 18:35 AWST.

19 March 2021 5	Perth Glory	0–1	Melbourne City	Perth
18:35 AWST		Report	Dobson 67'	Stadium: Dorrien Gardens; Attendance: 271; Referee: Kelly Jones
Note: Match originally scheduled for 23 January at 18:00 AWST, and rescheduled for 19 March at 18:35 AWST.

25 March 2021 7	Melbourne City	2–1	Perth Glory	Melbourne
19:05 AEDT	Dobson 63'; Chidiac 79'	Report	Charalambous 90+5'	Stadium: Frank Holohan Soccer Complex; Attendance: 454; Referee: Kate Jacewicz
Note: Match not originally set in fixture draw.

28 March 2021 4	Melbourne Victory	6–0	Perth Glory	Melbourne
16:05 AEDT	Ayres 21', 35'; Bunge 48'; Zimmerman 53'; Cooney-Cross 60', 76'	Report		Stadium: Epping Stadium; Attendance: 508; Referee: Rebecca Mackie
Note: Match originally scheduled for 14 January at 19:00 AEDT at Lakeside Stadium, but rescheduled to 7 February at 16:05 AEDT at Epping Stadium. Match then postponed after originally being scheduled for 7 February at 16:05 AEDT. It was rescheduled to 28 March.

== Statistics ==
=== Appearances and goals ===
Includes all competitions. Players with no appearances not included in the list.

No.	Pos	Nat	Player	Total		W-League	
No.	Pos	Nat	Player	Apps	Goals	Apps	Goals
1	GK	(New Zealand) NZL	Lily Anfield	12	0	12	0
4	DF	(Australia) AUS	Natasha Rigby	12	0	12	0
5	DF	(Republic of Ireland) IRL	Deborah-Anne De la Harpe	12	0	12	0
6	DF	(Australia) AUS	Tijan McKenna	12	0	4+8	0
7	DF	(New Zealand) NZL	Elizabeth Anton	12	1	12	1
13	DF	(Australia) AUS	Jamie-Lee Gale	7	0	4+3	0
31	DF	(Australia) AUS	Isabella Wallhead	7	0	4+3	0
8	MF	(Australia) AUS	Hana Lowry	12	2	11+1	2
9	MF	(New Zealand) NZL	Malia Steinmetz	12	0	11+1	0
10	MF	(Australia) AUS	Lexie Moreno	10	0	8+2	0
12	MF	(Australia) AUS	Sarah Morgan	11	0	7+4	0
14	MF	(Australia) AUS	Caitlin Doeglas	12	2	11+1	2
3	FW	(England) ENG	Gemma Craine	2	0	2	0
11	FW	(Australia) AUS	Patricia Charalambous	9	1	1+8	1
15	FW	(Australia) AUS	Abbey Green	2	0	0+2	0
17	FW	(Australia) AUS	Marianna Tabain	12	0	7+5	0
18	FW	(Australia) AUS	Taneesha Baker	4	0	4	0
23	FW	(Australia) AUS	Katarina Jukic	4	1	4	1

=== Disciplinary record ===
Includes all competitions. The list is sorted by squad number when total cards are equal. Players with no cards not included in the list.

No.	Pos	Nat	Player	Total			W-League		
No.	Pos	Nat	Player	Yellow card	Second yellow card	Red card	Yellow card	Second yellow card	Red card
2	DF	(Australia) AUS	Sarah Carroll	2	1	0	2	1	0
4	DF	(Australia) AUS	Natasha Rigby	2	0	0	2	0	0
8	MF	(Australia) AUS	Hana Lowry	2	0	0	2	0	0
10	MF	(Australia) AUS	Lexie Moreno	2	0	0	2	0	0
13	DF	(Australia) AUS	Jamie-Lee Gale	2	0	0	2	0	0
23	FW	(Australia) AUS	Katarina Jukic	2	0	0	2	0	0
5	DF	(Republic of Ireland) IRL	Deborah-Anne De la Harpe	1	0	0	1	0	0
6	DF	(Australia) AUS	Tijan McKenna	1	0	0	1	0	0
7	DF	(New Zealand) NZL	Elizabeth Anton	1	0	0	1	0	0
12	MF	(Australia) AUS	Sarah Morgan	1	0	0	1	0	0
17	MF	(Australia) AUS	Marianna Tabain	1	0	0	1	0	0

- (yellow card) = Number of bookings; (second yellow card) = Number of sending offs after a second yellow card; (red card) = Number of sending offs by a direct red card.
