= 2020–21 Canberra United FC (women) season =

Canberra United FC
2020–21 season
- Manager: Vicki Linton
- Stadium: Viking Park
- W-League: 4th
- Top goalscorer: Michelle Heyman
- Highest home attendance: 1,411
- Lowest home attendance: 1,041
- Average home league attendance: 1,205

The 2020–21 Canberra United FC season was the club's thirteenth season in the W-League, the premier competition for women's football. The team played home games at Viking Park. The club's manager for the season was new appointment Vicki Linton.

The season covered the period from 29 December 2020 to 11 April 2021.

== Transfers ==
=== Transfers in ===
Date	Position	Nationality	Name	From	Ref.
10 September 2020	MF	(Australia)	Grace Maher	Melbourne Victory	
9 October 2020	ST	(Australia)	Nickoletta Flannery	Newcastle Jets	
20 October 2020	DF	(Australia)	Clare Hunt	(Australia) Sydney University	
20 October 2020	DF	(Australia)	Jessika Nash	(Australia) Football NSW	
23 October 2020	DF	(Australia)	Isabella Foletta	Perth Glory	
6 November 2020	FW	(Australia)	Demi Koulizakis	(Australia) Sydney University	
10 November 2020	DF	(United States)	Kendall Fletcher	(Australia) Sydney University	
12 November 2020	FW	(New Zealand)	Paige Satchell	(Germany) SC Sand	
16 November 2020	ST	(Australia)	Michelle Heyman	Unattached	
3 December 2020	GK	(Australia)	Keeley Richards	(Australia) Logan Lightning	
28 December 2020	DF	(Australia)	Emma Ilijoski	(Australia) North West Sydney Koalas	
28 December 2020	MF	(Australia)	Sasha Grove	(Australia) Canberra United Academy	
22 January 2021	GK	(United States)	Chantel Jones	Retirement	

=== Transfers out ===
Date	Position	Nationality	Name	To	Ref.
1 January 2020	FW	(Norway)	Elise Thorsnes	(Norway) Avaldsnes IL	
29 January 2020	DF	(Australia)	Nikola Orgill	(Norway) Kolbotn	
28 February 2020	DF	(United States)	Kaleigh Kurtz	North Carolina Courage (end of loan)	
19 March 2020	MF	(Australia)	Rebekah Horsey	Mitchelton FC	
19 March 2020	GK	(Australia)	Sham Khamis	Macarthur Rams	
23 March 2020	FW	(Brazil)	Camila	Orlando Pride (end of loan)	
4 April 2020	FW	(United States)	Simone Charley	Portland Thorns (end of loan)	
1 July 2020	FW	(United States)	Katie Stengel	Houston Dash	(Note: Stengel was originally loaned to Canberra United by Utah Royals, but was traded to Houston Dash during the 2019–20 season.)
15 August 2020	MF	(Australia)	Emma Stanbury	Tuggeranong United	
3 September 2020	MF	(Australia)	Olivia Price	Western Sydney Wanderers	
22 October 2020	GK	(Australia)	Annalee Grove	Adelaide United	
27 October 2020	FW	(Australia)	Leena Khamis	Western Sydney Wanderers	
26 November 2020	FW	(Australia)	Patricia Charalambous	Perth Glory	
18 December 2020	MF	(Australia)	Taren King	Newcastle Jets	

== W-League ==
=== League table ===
Pos	Team	Pld	W	D	L	GF	GA	GD	Pts	Qualification
1	Sydney FC	12	9	1	2	26	11	+15	28	Qualification to Finals series
2	Brisbane Roar	12	7	4	1	29	12	+17	25	Qualification to Finals series
3	Melbourne Victory (C)	12	7	2	3	25	14	+11	23	Qualification to Finals series
4	Canberra United	12	6	4	2	21	16	+5	22	Qualification to Finals series
5	Adelaide United	12	7	1	4	22	18	+4	22	
6	Western Sydney Wanderers	12	4	1	7	13	21	−8	13	
7	Melbourne City	12	4	1	7	11	23	−12	13	
8	Newcastle Jets	12	2	1	9	14	21	−7	7	
9	Perth Glory	12	0	1	11	7	32	−25	1	

Source: A-Leagues
Rules for classification: 1) points; 2) goal difference; 3) number of goals scored.
(C) Champions

=== Results summary ===
Overall								Home						Away					
Pld	W	D	L	GF	GA	GD	Pts	W	D	L	GF	GA	GD	W	D	L	GF	GA	GD
12	6	4	2	21	16	+5	22	4	2	0	14	6	+8	2	2	2	7	10	−3

Last updated: 5 November 2021.
Source: Competitive Matches

=== Results by matchday ===
Round	1	2	3	4	5	6	7	8	9	10	11	12	13	14
Ground	H	H	A	B	H	B	A	A	H	A	H	A	A	H
Result	W	W	D	B	D	B	L	L	W	D	W	W	W	D
Position	2	1	1	2	3	4	5	5	5	5	5	5	4	4

Updated to match(es) played on 5 February 2019. Source: Competitive Matches
A = Away; H = Home; B = Bye; W = Win; D = Draw; L = Loss

=== Matches ===
Win Draw Loss

30 December 2020 1	Canberra United FC	4–3	Adelaide United	Canberra
18:35 AEDT	Heyman 48', 75', 90+3'; Hughes 90+1'	Report	Rojas 21'; I. Hodgson 28'; Weber 90+4'	Stadium: Viking Park; Attendance: 1,167; Referee: Kate Jacewicz

3 January 2021 2	Canberra United	2–1	Melbourne City	Canberra
16:05 AEDT	Heyman 73'; Flannery 90+3'	Report	McCormick 77'	Stadium: Viking Park; Attendance: 1,398; Referee: Casey Reibelt

7 January 2021 3	Brisbane Roar	1–1	Canberra United	Brisbane
18:05 AEST	Gorry 3'	Report	Maher 78'	Stadium: Moreton Daily Stadium; Attendance: 1,079; Referee: Isabella Blaess

24 January 2021 5	Canberra United	1–1	Perth Glory	Canberra
16:05 AEDT	Taylor-Young 87'	Report	Anton 86'	Stadium: Viking Park; Attendance: 1,041; Referee: Rebecca Durcau

8 February 2021 7	Sydney FC	4–0	Canberra United	Sydney
16:35 AEDT	Hawkesby 16'; Vine 64'; Siemsen 72', 76'	Report		Stadium: Jubilee Oval; Attendance: 1,337; Referee: Georgia Ghirardello

14 February 2021 8	Adelaide United	2–1	Canberra United	Adelaide
17:35 ACDT	Dawber 11'; Condon 55'	Report	Satchell 45+1'	Stadium: Marden Sports Complex; Attendance: 969; Referee: Isabella Blaess

30 January 2021 9	Canberra United	3–0	Western Sydney Wanderers	Canberra
17:05 AEDT	Heyman 3', 34'; Yeoman-Dale 41' (o.g.)	Report		Stadium: Viking Park; Attendance: 1,049; Referee: Lara Lee

28 February 2021 10	Melbourne Victory	1–1	Canberra United	Melbourne
16:05 AEDT	Beard 9'	Report	Flannery 45+2'	Stadium: Epping Stadium; Attendance: 562; Referee: Kelly Jones

7 March 2021 11	Canberra United	4–1	Brisbane Roar	Canberra
16:05 AEDT	Flannery 10'; Maher 23'; Heyman 29'; Galic 64'	Report	Gielnik 44'	Stadium: Viking Park; Attendance: 1,161; Referee: Rebecca Durcau

12 March 2021 12	Perth Glory	2–3	Canberra United	Canberra
18:05 AEDT	Doeglas 41'; Jukic 71'	Report	Flannery 36'; Heyman 54', 90+5'	Stadium: Viking Park; Attendance: 942; Referee: Lara Lee

20 March 2021 13	Newcastle Jets	0–1	Canberra United	Newcastle
17:35 AEDT		Report	Heyman 22'	Stadium: No. 2 Sportsground; Attendance: 437; Referee: Rachel Mitchenson

26 March 2021 14	Canberra United	0–0	Sydney FC	Canberra
17:35 AEDT		Report		Stadium: Viking Park; Attendance: 1,411; Referee: Rebecca Durcau

==== Finals series ====
5 April 2021 Semi-Final	Sydney FC	3–0	Canberra United	Sydney
15:00 AEST	Hawkesby 15'; Wheeler 64'; Green 73'	Report		Stadium: Netstrata Jubilee Stadium; Referee: Isabella Blaess

== Players ==
=== Squad information ===
As of 23 October 2020.

Note: Flags indicate national team as defined under FIFA eligibility rules; some limited exceptions apply. Players may hold more than one non-FIFA nationality.

No.	Pos.	Nation	Player
1	GK	AUS	Keeley Richards
2	DF	AUS	Emma Ilijoski
3	DF	AUS	Clare Hunt
4	DF	USA	Kendall Fletcher (captain)
5	DF	AUS	Lauren Keir
6	MF	AUS	Bianca Galic
7	MF	AUS	Rachael Goldstein
8	MF	AUS	Laura Hughes
9	FW	AUS	Demi Koulizakis
10	MF	AUS	Grace Maher (vice-captain)
11	MF	AUS	Ashlie Crofts

No.	Pos.	Nation	Player
12	FW	AUS	Hayley Taylor-Young
13	FW	NZL	Paige Satchell
14	DF	AUS	Jessie Rasschaert
15	DF	AUS	Jessika Nash
18	DF	AUS	Isabella Foletta
19	FW	AUS	Nickoletta Flannery
20	FW	AUS	Sasha Grove
22	GK	AUS	Sally James
23	FW	AUS	Michelle Heyman (vice-captain)
29	GK	USA	Chantel Jones

== Squad statistics ==
=== Appearances and goals ===
No.	Pos	Nat	Player	Total		W-League	
No.	Pos	Nat	Player	Apps	Goals	Apps	Goals
Goalkeepers
1	GK	(Australia) AUS	Keeley Richards	8	0	8	0
22	GK	(Australia) AUS	Sally James	3	0	3	0
29	GK	(United States) USA	Chantel Jones	1	0	1	0
Defenders
2	DF	(Australia) AUS	Emma Ilijoski	9	0	9	0
3	DF	(Australia) AUS	Clare Hunt	1	0	1	0
4	DF	(United States) USA	Kendall Fletcher	12	0	12	0
5	DF	(Australia) AUS	Lauren Keir	12	0	12	0
14	DF	(Australia) AUS	Jessie Rasschaert	4	0	4	0
15	DF	(Australia) AUS	Jessika Nash	12	0	12	0
18	DF	(Australia) AUS	Isabella Foletta	7	0	7	0
Midfielders
6	MF	(Australia) AUS	Bianca Galic	10	1	10	1
7	MF	(Australia) AUS	Rachael Goldstein	5	0	5	0
8	MF	(Australia) AUS	Laura Hughes	12	1	12	1
10	MF	(Australia) AUS	Grace Maher	12	2	12	2
11	MF	(Australia) AUS	Ashlie Crofts	0	0	0	0
19	MF	(Australia) AUS	Sasha Grove	4	0	4	0
Forwards
9	FW	(Australia) AUS	Demi Koulizakis	11	0	11	0
12	FW	(Australia) AUS	Hayley Taylor-Young	11	1	11	1
13	FW	(New Zealand) NZL	Paige Satchell	12	1	12	1
19	FW	(Australia) AUS	Nickoletta Flannery	12	4	12	4
23	FW	(Australia) AUS	Michelle Heyman	12	10	12	10

Last updated: 18 November 2021
Source: Competitions

=== Goalscorers ===
Rank	Pos.	No.	Player	W-League
1	FW	23	(Australia) Michelle Heyman	10
2	FW	19	(Australia) Nickoletta Flannery	4
3	MF	10	(Australia) Grace Maher	2
4	MF	8	(Australia) Laura Hughes	1
4	FW	13	(New Zealand) Paige Satchell	1
4	MF	6	(Australia) Bianca Galic	1
4	FW	12	(Australia) Hayley Taylor-Young	1
Total				20

Source: Match reports in Competitions

=== Assists ===
Rank	Pos.	No.	Player	W-League
1	FW	23	(Australia) Michelle Heyman	3
2	MF	8	(Australia) Laura Hughes	2
2	MF	10	(Australia) Grace Maher	2
2	DF	5	(Australia) Laura Keir	2
3	DF	15	(Australia) Jessika Nash	1
3	FW	19	(Australia) Nickoletta Flannery	1
3	FW	9	(Australia) Demi Koulizakis	1
3	MF	6	(Australia) Bianca Galic	1
3	FW	12	(Australia) Hayley Taylor-Young	1
3	MF	19	(Australia) Sasha Grove	1
3	MF	7	(Australia) Rachel Goldstein	1
Total				20

Source: Match reports in Competitions

=== Disciplinary record ===
Rank	Position	Name	W-League	
Rank	Position	Name	Yellow card	Red card
1	MF	(Australia) Laura Hughes	3	0
2	DF	(Australia) Jessikah Nash	2	0
3	FW	(Australia) Nickoletta Flannery	1	0
3	MF	(Australia) Demi Koulizakis	1	0
Total			8	0

Source: Match reports in Competitions
