= Ilijoski =

Ilijoski is a surname. Notable people with the surname include:

- Blazhe Ilijoski (born 1984), Macedonian footballer
- Emma Ilijoski (born 2003), Australian soccer player
