= Melbourne City FC (women) league record by opponent =

Australian professional women's football club

Melbourne City Women Football Club is an Australian professional women's association football club based in Bundoora, Melbourne. The club was formed in 2015. They became the first team to win three consecutive W-League championships from 2016 to 2018. Their record against each club faced in the W-League is listed below. Melbourne City Women's first W-League match was against Sydney FC and they met eight different league opponents. The team that Melbourne City Women have played most in league competition is Brisbane Roar, who they first met in the 2015–16 W-League season. The 5 defeats in 12 meetings against Melbourne Victory is more than they have lost against any other club. Adelaide United and Brisbane Roar have drawn 3 league encounters with Melbourne City Women, more than any other club. Melbourne City Women have recorded more league victories against Newcastle Jets than against any other club, having beaten them 9 times out of 10 attempts.

== Key ==
- The table includes results of matches played by Melbourne City Women in the W-League.
- The name used for each opponent is the name they had when Arsenal most recently played a league match against them. Results against each opponent include results against that club under any former name..
- The columns headed "First" and "Last" contain the first and most recent seasons in which Arsenal played league matches against each opponent.
- P = matches played; W = matches won; D = matches drawn; L = matches lost; Win% = percentage of total matches won
- † Clubs with this background and symbol in the "Opponent" column are Melbourne City Women's divisional rivals in the current season.
- ‡ Clubs with this background and symbol in the "Opponent" column are defunct.

== All-time league record ==
Statistics correct as of matches played on 25 March 2021.

Melbourne City FC (W-League) league record by opponent
Club	P	W	D	L	P	W	D	L	P	W	D	L	Win%	First	Last	Notes
Club	Home				Away				Total				Win%	First	Last	Notes
Adelaide United †	5	2	3	0	1	0	0	1	6	2	3	1	33.33	2015–16	2020–21	
Brisbane Roar †	7	3	2	2	6	4	1	1	13	7	3	3	53.85	2015–16	2020–21	
Canberra United †	4	3	0	1	6	4	0	2	10	7	0	3	70.00	2015–16	2020–21	
Melbourne Victory †	6	4	0	2	6	3	0	3	12	7	0	5	58.33	2015–16	2020–21	
Newcastle Jets †	5	5	0	0	5	4	1	0	10	9	1	0	90.00	2015–16	2020–21	
Perth Glory †	5	4	0	1	5	3	0	2	10	7	0	3	70.00	2015–16	2020–21	
Sydney FC †	5	4	0	1	6	4	1	1	11	8	1	2	72.73	2015–16	2020–21	
Western Sydney Wanderers †	3	2	0	1	5	3	0	2	8	5	0	3	62.50	2015–16	2020–21	
