= 2020–21 Newcastle Jets FC (women) season =

Newcastle Jets W-League
2020–21 season
- Manager: Ash Wilson
- Stadium: McDonald Jones Stadium and Newcastle Number 2 Sports Ground
Home colours	Away colours	Third colours

The 2020–21 Newcastle Jets W-League season was their thirteenth season in the W-League, the premier competition for women's football in Australia.

== W-League ==
=== League table ===
Pos	Team	Pld	W	D	L	GF	GA	GD	Pts	Qualification
1	Sydney FC	12	9	1	2	26	11	+15	28	Qualification to Finals series
2	Brisbane Roar	12	7	4	1	29	12	+17	25	Qualification to Finals series
3	Melbourne Victory (C)	12	7	2	3	25	14	+11	23	Qualification to Finals series
4	Canberra United	12	6	4	2	21	16	+5	22	Qualification to Finals series
5	Adelaide United	12	7	1	4	22	18	+4	22	
6	Western Sydney Wanderers	12	4	1	7	13	21	−8	13	
7	Melbourne City	12	4	1	7	11	23	−12	13	
8	Newcastle Jets	12	2	1	9	14	21	−7	7	
9	Perth Glory	12	0	1	11	7	32	−25	1	

Source: A-Leagues
Rules for classification: 1) points; 2) goal difference; 3) number of goals scored.
(C) Champions
