= Jemma House =

Australian soccer player

Personal information
- Full name: Jemma House
- Date of birth: 2 November 1996 (age 30)
- Place of birth: Maitland, Australia
- Position: Striker

College career
Years	Team	Apps	(Gls)
2015–2016	Laramie County Community College	44	(47)
2017	University of Wyoming	19	(2)
2018	Nova Southeastern Sharks	19	(14)

Senior career*
Years	Team	Apps	(Gls)
2020	Newcastle Olympic Women	16	(33)
2020–2022	Newcastle Jets	21	(1)
- * Club domestic league appearances and goals as of 7 March 2022

Jemma House (born 2 November 1996) is an Australian soccer player who last played for the Newcastle Jets.

== Early life ==
House grew up in Kurri Kurri, New South Wales and attended Hunter Sports High School in Gateshead where she excelled in Football winning the school's Women's Football Player of the Year in 2014.

== Club career ==
After a number of years playing College soccer in the United States where House had become known for being a prolific goal scorer, she returned to her hometown of Newcastle in 2019 where the striker successfully trialled with Women's Premier League side Newcastle Olympic FC.

In 2020 House scored 33 goals in 16 games as Olympic won both the Premiership and Championship in their maiden season in the league. In the Grand Final she scored a brace as the club beat Warners Bay FC 3–2 and was named Player of the Match, House was later awarded Player of the Season and the Golden Boot for the WPL.

After her impressive season in the local league Newcastle Jets manager Ash Wilson signed House for the upcoming 2020–21 season. House played ten matches across the season and re-signed with the club for the following season.

== Career statistics ==
As of match played 7 March 2022

Appearances and goals by club, season and competition
Club	Season	League			Cup		Continental		Other		Total	
Club	Season	Division	Apps	Goals	Apps	Goals	Apps	Goals	Apps	Goals	Apps	Goals
Newcastle Jets	2020–21	A-League Women	10	0	-	-	-	-	-	-	10	0
Newcastle Jets	2021–22	A-League Women	11	1	-	-	-	-	-	-	11	1
Career total			21	1	0	0	0	0	0	0	21	1
