= Dorrien Gardens =

Sports ground in West Perth, Western Australia

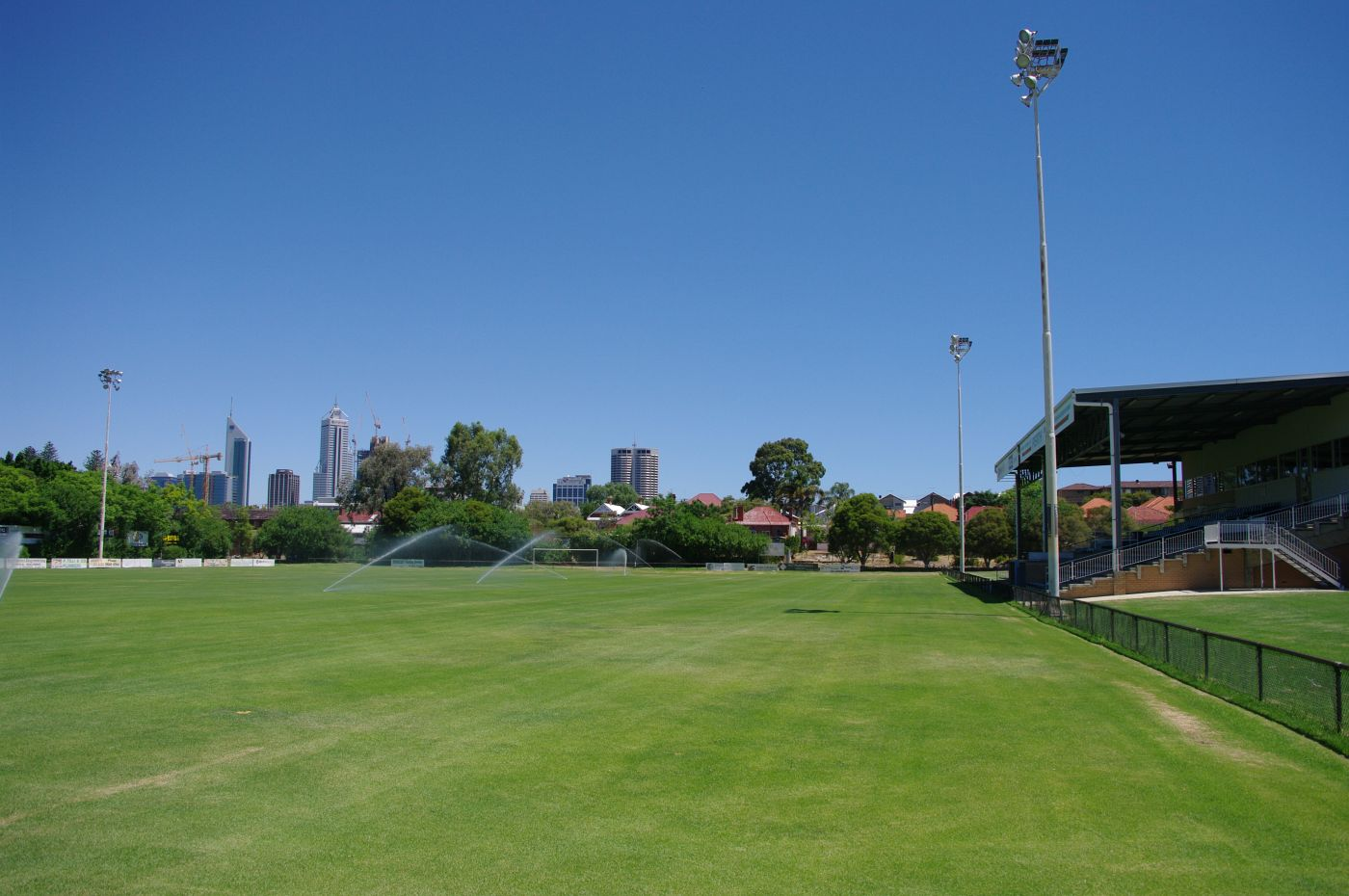
- Looking south at the grandstand with the Perth CBD in the background
- Interactive map of Dorrien Gardens
- Full name: Dorrien Gardens Reserve
- Location: Lawley Street, West Perth
- Coordinates: 31°56′20″S 115°51′18″E
- Owner: City of Vincent
- Capacity: 4000
- Surface: grass
- Scoreboard: Yes

Tenant
- Perth Azzurri

Dorrien Gardens is a sports ground in West Perth, Western Australia primarily used for soccer. It is the home ground of Perth Azzurri.

== History ==
Dorrien Gardens is named after James Dorrien, a local businessman and benefactor who donated the land on which the gardens were established.

In 1951, the City of Perth allocated the ground to Azzurri ahead of their first season in the first tier of Western Australian soccer.

The Dorrien Gardens Reserve was further developed in the 1970s when the local council resumed land from a series of properties on Cowle Street.

In 1987, Perth Italia – a club formed from the merger of Azzurri, East Fremantle Tricolore and Balcatta Etna – chose Dorrien Gardens as their home ground.

== Perth Glory matches ==
Perth Glory have played occasional preseason matches at the ground, including for the 2015 Call to Arms Cup match against the WA state team. Perth Glory played their 2015 FFA Cup quarter final against Western Sydney Wanderers at the venue on 29 September, prevailing 4–2 on penalties after a 1–1 normal time draw, in front of a crowd of 3003 people.

In 2016, they played an FFA Cup match against Sydney FC, going down 0–2 in extra time, in front of a crowd in excess of 2,500.

== Perth Glory Women matches ==
The venue was the home ground of the Perth Glory Women from the 2016–17 W-League season to the 2020–21 W-League season.
