= Emma Ilijoski =

Australian footballer

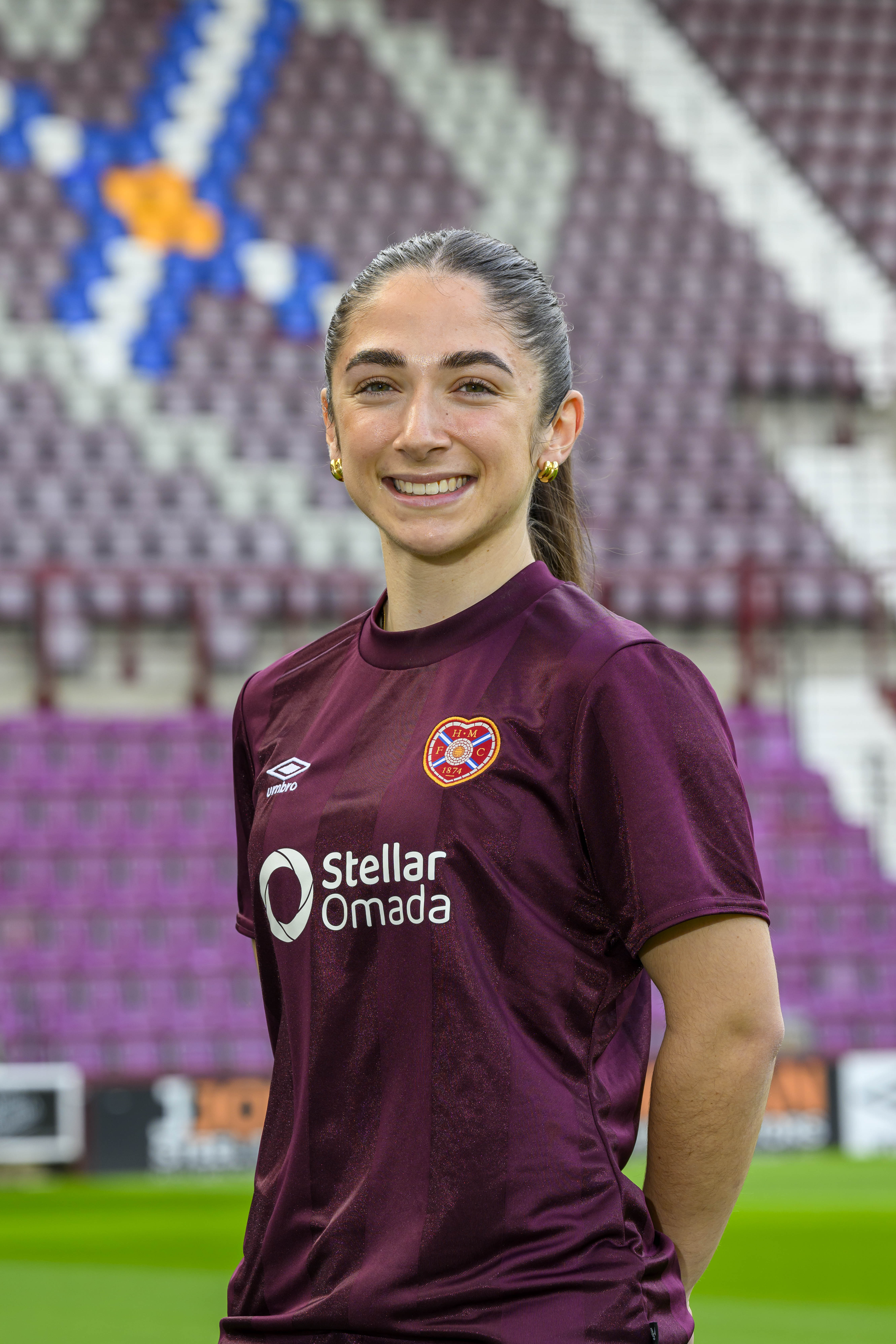
- Ilijoski in July 2024

Personal information
- Full name: Emma Jessica Ilijoski
- Date of birth: 8 January 2003 (age 23)
- Place of birth: Gungahlin, Australian Capital Territory, Australia
- Position: Defender

Team information
- Current team: Odense

Youth career
- Gungahlin United

Senior career*
Years	Team	Apps	(Gls)
2020–2022	Canberra United	22	(0)
2022	Sydney University	21	(0)
2022–2024	Canberra United	33	(0)
2024–2026	Heart of Midlothian	4	(0)
2025–2026	→ Aberdeen (loan)	36	(0)
2026–	Odense	0	(0)

International career^{‡}
2019	Australia U16	4	(0)
- * Club domestic league appearances and goals as of 25 May 2025 ‡ National team caps and goals as of 25 May 2025

Emma Jessica Ilijoski (Macedonian: Ема Џесика Илијоски, pronounced [iˈlijɔski] ee-LEE-yoh-skee; born 8 January 2003) is an Australian soccer player who plays as a defender for A-Liga club Odense BK Q. She previously played for A-League Women club Canberra United, National Premier Leagues NSW Women's (NPL NSW Women's) club Sydney University, and Scottish Women's Premier League (SWPL) clubs Heart of Midlothian and Aberdeen.

== Club career ==
Ilijoski started her football career with Gungahlin United. She trained at the Canberra United FC academy and joined the full squad for two season prior to 2022. She was re-signed for another two-year contract with the team in June 2022, and also co-captained the Junior Matildas national team.

In July 2024, Ilijoski signed a two-year deal with the Scottish football team Heart of Midlothian. While playing for Hearts, Ilijoski made four first-team appearances. She joined Aberdeen on loan in January 2025.

In July 2026, Ilijoski signed for A-Liga club Odense BK Q.

== Football activism ==
In July 2023, Ilijoski started a campaign to reform women's football uniforms in Australia, with some having to wear poorly-fitting men's uniforms. She called for specifically-designed clothes to be created in cooperation with women.

In 2024, Ilijoski was a leading figure in the Professional Footballers Australia trade union's Our Greener Pitch project against climate change. She played in the A-League's first "Green Game", which focused on reducing team travel, reducing waste, and educating people. The initiative was nominated for Elite Organisation of the Year at the 2024 BBC Sport Green Awards.

== Personal life ==
Ilijoski was born in Gungahlin in the Australian Capital Territory.
