= Jamilla Rankin =

Australian soccer player (born 2003)

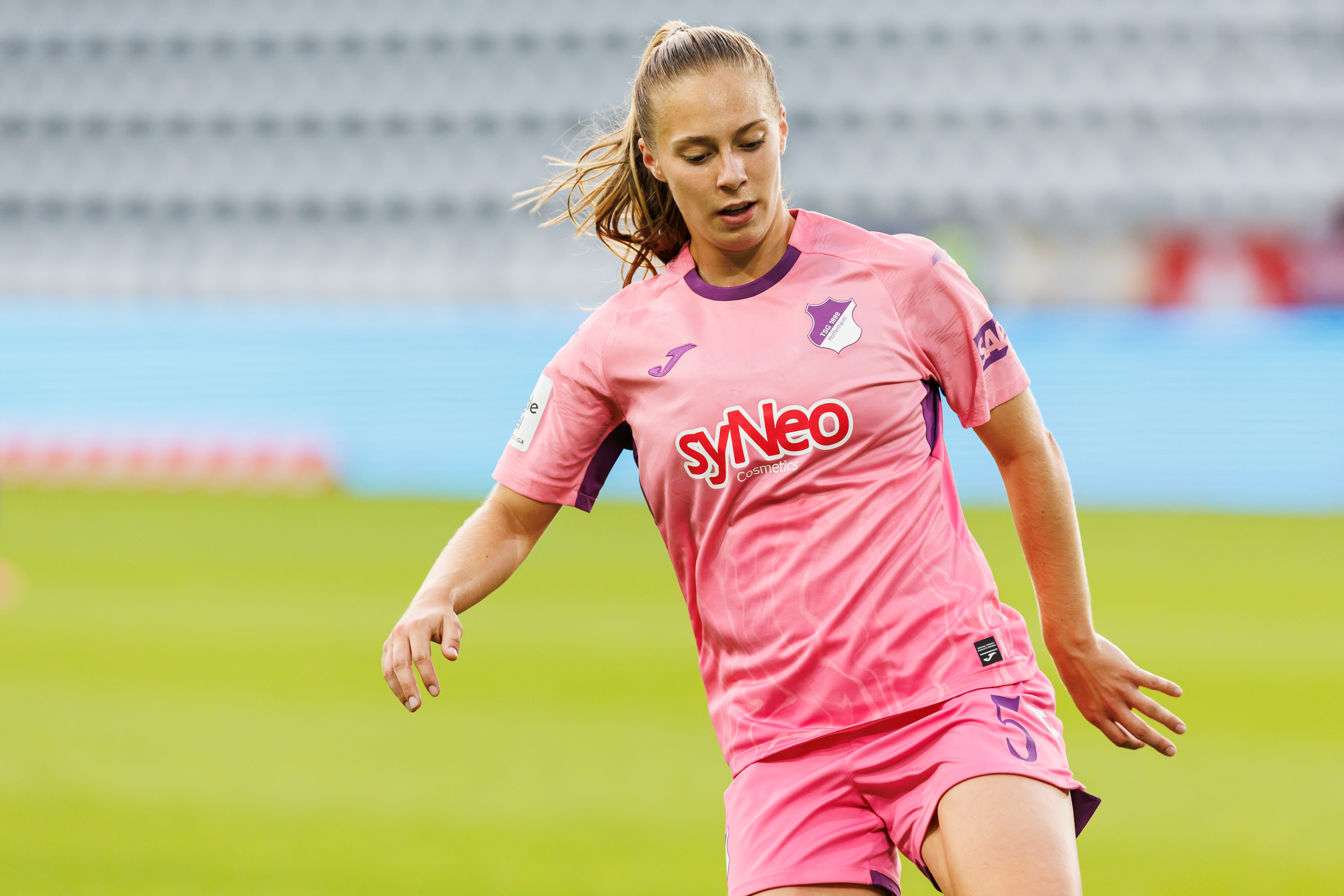
- Rankin with TSG Hoffenheim in 2025

Personal information
- Full name: Jamilla Sofia Rankin
- Date of birth: 9 May 2003 (age 23)
- Place of birth: Lismore, New South Wales, Australia
- Height: 1.70 m (5 ft 7 in)
- Position: Defender

Team information
- Current team: Eintracht Frankfurt
- Number: 15

Youth career
- Eureka
- Liverpool Academy
- Brisbane Roar NTC

Senior career*
Years	Team	Apps	(Gls)
2019	Brisbane Roar NTC		
2019–2023	Brisbane Roar	45	(1)
2020–2021	Football NSW		
2021	Gold Coast United		
2022	Blacktown Spartans		
2023–2024	Melbourne Victory	23	(0)
2024–2026	TSG Hoffenheim	41	(2)
2026–	Eintracht Frankfurt	5	(0)

International career^{‡}
2018–2020	Australia U17	6	(0)
2022–2024	Australia U23	5	(0)
2022–	Australia	9	(0)
- * Club domestic league appearances and goals as of 18 November 2026 ‡ National team caps and goals as of 30 April 2026

Jamilla Sofia Rankin (born 9 May 2003) is an Australian professional soccer player who plays as a defender for Eintracht Frankfurt in the Frauen-Bundesliga and the Australia national team (the Matildas). She previously played for Brisbane Roar and Melbourne Victory in the A-League Women and TSG Hoffenheim in the Frauen-Bundesliga.

== Early life ==
Rankin was born on 9 May 2003 in Lismore, New South Wales. She is of English descent, with her mother being from England. Growing up in Lismore, she attended Rosebank Public School (from kindergarten to Year 6), Trinity Catholic College, Lismore (from Year 7 to Year 9) and Cavendish Road State High School in Brisbane. While attending Rosebank, she competed in athletics as well as soccer. As a junior she played soccer for Eureka in Football Far North Coast (FFNC) league. In 2016, while with FFNC, Rankin was selected to represent the Northern New South Wales Football (NNSWF) under-13 girls team at the national Youth Championships for Girls. At 14 years old, while at Cavendish Road, she attended their academy, which is part of QAS NTC (Queensland Academy of Sport National Training Centre) and is aligned with Brisbane Roar Juniors; the combination is referred to as Brisbane Roar NTC.

== Club career ==
In 2019 Rankin, as a defender, graduated from Brisbane Roar NTC to Football Queensland NTC seniors, which compete in the National Premier Leagues Queensland (NPL Qld). In March 2020, Rankin made her W-League (later known as A-League Women) debut for Brisbane Roar seniors during their 2019–20 season, in a 3–1 loss to Melbourne City. During the W-League 2020 off-season (mid-year) the defender played for Football NSW Institute in the National Premier Leagues NSW Women's (NPL NSW Women's).

In 2021, Rankin received a Young Footballer of the Year nomination in February, due to her successful season in the 2020–21 W-League. She kicked her maiden goal in Brisbane Roar's 4–1 defeat of Sydney in February 2021. Initially playing as a left-back defender, during that year she became a centre-back. In August, Rankin re-signed with her team. Her performances in the first two seasons in the W-League earned favourable comparisons with fellow Australian defenders Steph Catley and Ellie Carpenter. By the end of Brisbane's 2022-23 season she had played 45 matches and delivered one goal.

In August 2023, Rankin joined Melbourne Victory for their 2023–24 season. She appeared 23 times during the season, and the team finished fourth on the Premiership ladder and lost a penalty shoot-out (2–4), upon drawing 0–0 after extra-time, against Central Coast Mariners in the Championship elimination final.

Rankin signed with German club TSG Hoffenheim in August 2024 on a three-year contract. In the 2024–25 Frauen-Bundesliga she played 18 matches and helped TSG to finish sixth on the league table. During the related 2024–25 DFB-Pokal Frauen, Rankin kicked a goal in their 0–7 victory against SV Hegnach.

On 3 July 2026, it was announced that Rankin had signed a three-year contract with Eintracht Frankfurt, valid until 30 June 2029.

== International career ==
Rankin was a part of the Australia women's national under-17 soccer team (Junior Matildas) during the 2019 AFC U-16 Women's Championship qualification and final tournament. She featured during two matches of qualification as well as in four games in the final tournament, playing 360 minutes, starting each game she played in.

On 21 November 2020, Rankin was called up for the first ever Women's Talent Identification Camp which was held in Canberra from 22 – 26 of November 2020. She was selected for the Australia women's national under-23 soccer team (U23 Matildas) squad for the 2022 AFF Women's Championship held in the Philippines in July. They competed against senior teams from ASEAN Football Federation, finishing third in their group and being eliminated. Rankin returned to the U23 Matildas at the Four Nations invitational under-23 tournament held in Växjö, Sweden from 30 May to 4 June 2024. Her team lost against Sweden and Germany, but won against Poland.

Rankin made her debut for the Australia women's national soccer team (Matildas) on 25 June 2022 in a 7–0 defeat by Spain in Huelva, Spain.

== Personal life ==
Rankin speaks English as her first language. Due to her time playing in the Frauen-Bundesliga and living in Germany, she also speaks and understands a reasonable amount of German, but prefers to conduct interviews in English.
