= Hayley Taylor-Young =

Australian soccer player

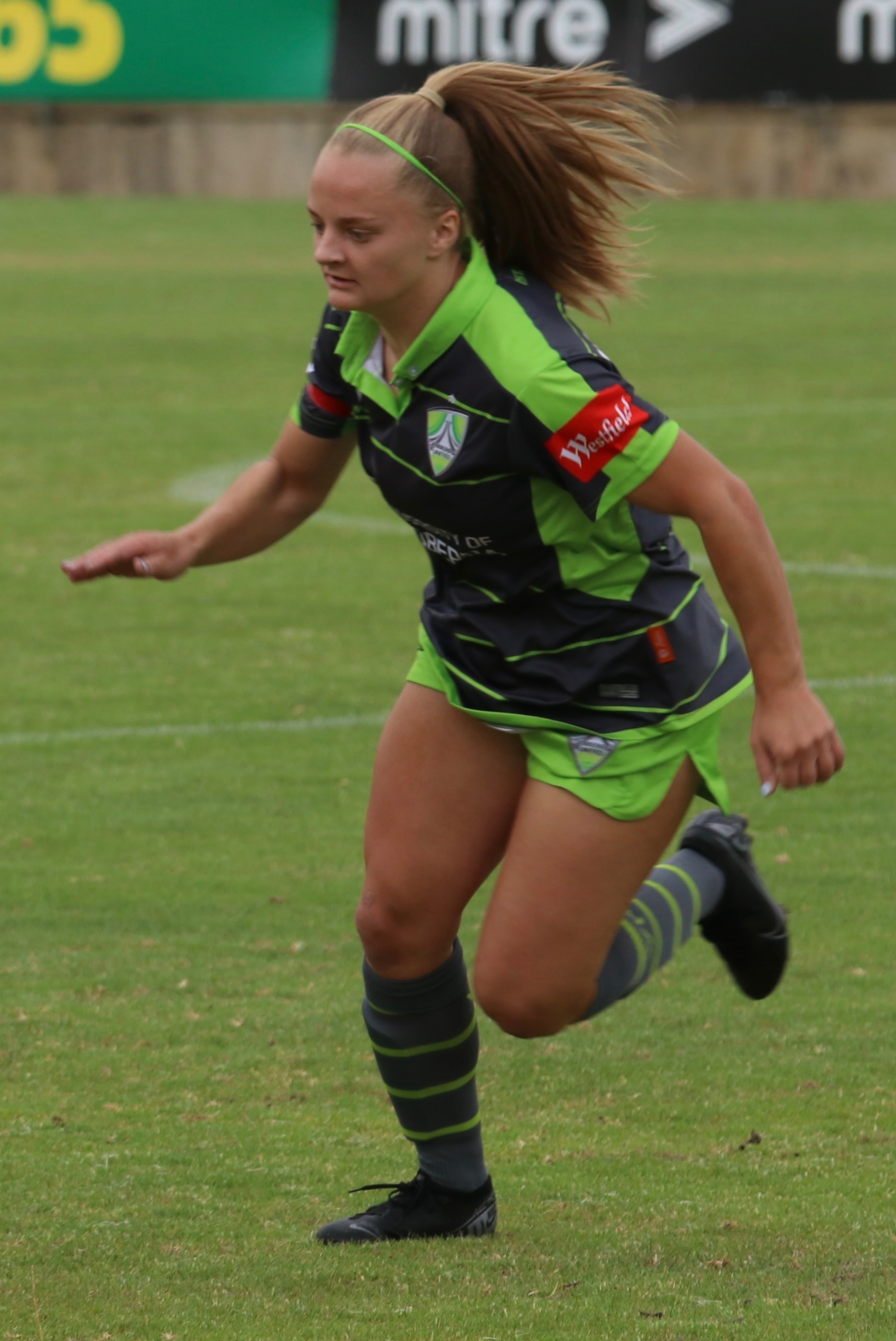
- Taylor-Young in 2019

Personal information
- Full name: Hayley Taylor-Young
- Date of birth: 25 February 2002 (age 24)
- Place of birth: Canberra, Australia,
- Height: 5 ft 3 in (1.61 m)
- Position: Forward

Team information
- Current team: Canberra United
- Number: 12

Youth career
- Canberra United

Senior career*
Years	Team	Apps	(Gls)
2019–	Canberra United	44	(2)
- * Club domestic league appearances and goals as of 28 May 2024

Hayley Taylor-Young (born 25 February 2002) is an Australian soccer player. She plays for Canberra United in the W-League. She is a graduate of their pathway program and had a breakout season with the Canberra United Academy in 2019, after which she was signed by the senior team for the 2019–20 W-League season.

She made her debut, coming off the bench in Canberra's 3–2 win over Newcastle Jets FC in round 3 of the 2019–20 season, and scored her first goal in a 2–1 victory over Adelaide United in round 6.

Taylor-Young grew up in Canberra and began playing in the Canberra senior team while still at school.
