= 2020–21 W-League =

Thirteenth edition of the top Australian women's football (soccer) league

W-League
- Season: 2020–21
- Dates: 29 December 2020 – 11 April 2021
- Champions: Melbourne Victory (2nd title)
- Premiers: Sydney FC (3rd title)
- Matches: 56
- Goals: 180 (3.21 per match)
- Top goalscorer: Emily Gielnik (13 goals)
- Biggest home win: Brisbane Roar 6–0 Melbourne Victory (22 January 2021); Melbourne Victory 6–0 Perth Glory (28 March 2021)
- Biggest away win: Melbourne City 0–6 Melbourne Victory (10 January 2021)
- Highest scoring: Perth Glory 2–6 Sydney FC (25 February 2021)
- Longest winning run: 6 matches Sydney FC
- Longest unbeaten run: 9 matches Brisbane Roar
- Longest winless run: 11 matches Perth Glory
- Longest losing run: 8 matches Perth Glory
- Highest attendance: 5,159; Adelaide United 3–1 Western Sydney Wanderers (16 January 2021)
- Lowest attendance: 250; Perth Glory 0–1 Melbourne Victory (16 March 2021); Not including behind closed doors matches
- (Note: Longest runs only include regular season results.)

The 2020–21 W-League season was the thirteenth season of the W-League, the Australian national women's association football competition. The season started on 29 December 2020 and ended with the Grand final on 11 April 2021.

== Clubs ==
=== Stadiums and locations ===
Team	Location	Stadium	Capacity
Adelaide United	Adelaide	Marden Sports Complex; Coopers Stadium	6,000; 16,500
Brisbane Roar	Brisbane	Suncorp Stadium; Lions Stadium	52,500; 5,000
Canberra United	Canberra	Viking Park	7,000
Melbourne City	Melbourne	Frank Holohan Soccer Complex	2,000
Melbourne Victory	Melbourne	CB Smith Reserve; Epping Stadium; AAMI Park; Latrobe City Stadium	2,000; 10,000; 30,050; 12,000
Newcastle Jets	Newcastle	Newcastle Number 2 Sports Ground; McDonald Jones Stadium	5,000; 33,000
Perth Glory	Perth	Dorrien Gardens	4,000
Sydney FC	Sydney Wollongong	Seymour Shaw; Jubilee Oval; Leichhardt Oval; WIN Stadium	5,000; 20,505; 20,000; 23,000
Western Sydney Wanderers	Sydney	Marconi Stadium; Stadium Australia; Bankwest Stadium; Wanderers Football Park	9,000; 83,500; 30,000; 1,000

=== Personnel and kits ===
Team	Manager	Captain	Kit manufacturers	Kit sponsors
Adelaide United	(Australia) Adrian Stenta	(Australia) Dylan Holmes	UCAN	SA Power Networks
Brisbane Roar	(Australia) Jake Goodship	(Australia) Clare Polkinghorne	Umbro	Fuel Your Life
Canberra United	(Australia) Vicki Linton	(United States) Kendall Fletcher	Apelle	DKD Consulting
Melbourne City	(Australia) Rado Vidošić	(Australia) Emma Checker	Puma	Etihad Airways
Melbourne Victory	(Wales) Jeff Hopkins	(Australia) Angela Beard	Adidas	Fuel Your Life
Newcastle Jets	(Australia) Ash Wilson	(Australia) Cassidy Davis (Australia) Gema Simon	Apelle	Greater Bank
Perth Glory	(Australia) Alexander Epakis	(Australia) Natasha Rigby	Macron	BHP
Sydney FC	(Australia) Ante Juric	(Australia) Teresa Polias	Under Armour	The Star
Western Sydney Wanderers	(Australia) Dean Heffernan	(Australia) Caitlin Cooper (Australia) Erica Halloway	Kappa	Intermain

=== Managerial changes ===
Team	Outgoing manager	Manner of departure	Date of vacancy	Position on table	Incoming manager	Date of appointment
Canberra United	(Australia) Heather Garriock	Sacked	1 March 2020	Pre-season	(Australia) Vicki Linton	31 July 2020
Adelaide United	(Australia) Ivan Karlović	Appointed Head of Women's Football	4 August 2020	Pre-season	(Australia) Adrian Stenta	4 August 2020
Perth Glory	(Australia) Bobby Despotovski	Resigned	2 November 2020	Pre-season	(Australia) Alexander Epakis	20 November 2020

=== Foreign players ===
Club	Visa 1	Visa 2	Visa 3	Visa 4	Non-Visa foreigner(s)	Former player(s)
Adelaide United	(Chile) María José Rojas	(England) Fiona Worts	(Netherlands) Maruschka Waldus	(United States) Mallory Weber		
Brisbane Roar	(Brazil) Mariel Hecher	(New Zealand) Olivia Chance				(England) Billie Murphy
Canberra United	(New Zealand) Paige Satchell	(United States) Kendall Fletcher	(United States) Chantel Jones			
Melbourne City	(France) Margot Robinne	(Japan) Chinatsu Kira	(Norway) Noor Eckhoff	(United States) Samantha Johnson	(Serbia) Tyla-Jay Vlajnic^{A}	
Melbourne Victory	(Argentina) Gaby Garton	(New Zealand) Claudia Bunge	(United States) Kayla Morrison	(United States) Catherine Zimmerman	(Canada) Natalie Martineau^{B} (New Zealand) Annalie Longo^{A}	
Newcastle Jets						
Perth Glory	(England) Gemma Craine	(New Zealand) Lily Alfeld	(New Zealand) Elizabeth Anton	(New Zealand) Malia Steinmetz		
Sydney FC						
Western Sydney Wanderers	(Republic of Ireland) Julie-Ann Russell					

The following do not fill a Visa position:
^{A} Australian citizens who have chosen to represent another national team;
^{B} Those players who were born and started their professional career abroad but have since gained Australian citizenship;
^{G} Guest Players;
^{R} Injury Replacement Players, or National Team Replacement Players

== Regular season ==
The regular season commenced on 29 December 2020, and ran until 31 March 2021.

=== League table ===
Pos	Team	Pld	W	D	L	GF	GA	GD	Pts	Qualification
1	Sydney FC	12	9	1	2	26	11	+15	28	Qualification to Finals series
2	Brisbane Roar	12	7	4	1	29	12	+17	25	Qualification to Finals series
3	Melbourne Victory (C)	12	7	2	3	25	14	+11	23	Qualification to Finals series
4	Canberra United	12	6	4	2	21	16	+5	22	Qualification to Finals series
5	Adelaide United	12	7	1	4	22	18	+4	22	
6	Western Sydney Wanderers	12	4	1	7	13	21	−8	13	
7	Melbourne City	12	4	1	7	11	23	−12	13	
8	Newcastle Jets	12	2	1	9	14	21	−7	7	
9	Perth Glory	12	0	1	11	7	32	−25	1	

Source: A-Leagues
Rules for classification: 1) points; 2) goal difference; 3) number of goals scored.
(C) Champions

=== Results ===
Home \ Away	ADE	BRI	CNU	MCY	MVC	NEW	PER	SYD	WSW
Adelaide United			2–1	2–1	0–1		1–0	2–0	3–1
Brisbane Roar	4–2		1–1	0–0	6–0	3–0	4–0		
Canberra United	4–3	4–1		2–1			1–1	0–0	3–0
Melbourne City		2–3			0–6	1–0	2–1	0–2	0–4
Melbourne Victory		0–0	1–1	2–3		4–2	6–0		1–0
Newcastle Jets	1–2	1–1	0–1		0–2			1–2	4–1
Perth Glory	1–2		2–3	0–1	0–1	0–4		2–6	
Sydney FC	2–1	1–4	4–0		2–1	2–0			2–0
Western Sydney Wanderers	2–2	1–2		1–0		2–1	1–0	0–3	

Source: W-League
Legend: Blue = home team win; Yellow = draw; Red = away team win.

== Fixtures ==
=== Round 1 ===
29 December 2020	Brisbane Roar	0–0	Melbourne City	Brisbane
15:35 AEST		Report		Stadium: Moreton Daily Stadium; Attendance: 1,174; Referee: Rebecca Durcau

30 December 2020	Western Sydney Wanderers	0–3	Sydney FC	Parramatta
16:35 AEDT		Report	Vine 27'; Ibini 60', 86'	Stadium: Bankwest Stadium; Attendance: 3,027; Referee: Kelly Jones

30 December 2020	Canberra United	4–3	Adelaide United	Canberra
18:35 AEDT	Heyman 48', 75', 90+3'; Hughes 90+1'	Report	Rojas 21'; I. Hodgson 28'; Weber 90+4'	Stadium: Viking Park; Attendance: 1,167; Referee: Kate Jacewicz

=== Round 2 ===
2 January 2021	Western Sydney Wanderers	2–1	Newcastle Jets	Parramatta
19:05 AEDT	Galea 21', 52'	Report	Andrews 46'	Stadium: Wanderers Centre of Football; Attendance: 279; Referee: Kelly Jones

3 January 2021	Canberra United	2–1	Melbourne City	Canberra
16:05 AEDT	Heyman 73'; Flannery 90+3'	Report	McCormick 77'	Stadium: Viking Park; Attendance: 1,398; Referee: Casey Reibelt

3 January 2021	Melbourne Victory	0–0	Brisbane Roar	Melbourne
18:05 AEDT		Report		Stadium: CB Smith Reserve; Attendance: 426; Referee: Lara Lee

=== Round 3 ===
7 January 2021	Brisbane Roar	1–1	Canberra United	Brisbane
18:05 AEST	Gorry 3'	Report	Maher 78'	Stadium: Moreton Daily Stadium; Attendance: 1,079; Referee: Isabella Blaess

8 January 2021	Newcastle Jets	1–2	Sydney FC	Newcastle
16:35 AEDT	Andrews 41'	Report	Ray 48'; Lowe 75'	Stadium: McDonald Jones Stadium; Attendance: 1,918; Referee: Isabella Libri

9 January 2021	Adelaide United	1–0	Perth Glory	Adelaide
18:35 ACDT	Condon 80' (pen.)	Report		Stadium: Marden Sports Complex; Attendance: 1,074; Referee: Georgia Ghirardello

10 January 2021	Melbourne City	0–6	Melbourne Victory	Melbourne
16:05 AEDT		Report	Longo 15'; Ayres 29'; De Vanna 72'; Jackson 80'; Zimmerman 90'; Cooney-Cross 90+2'	Stadium: CB Smith Reserve; Attendance: 729; Referee: Lachlan Keevers

=== Round 4 ===
14 January 2021	Perth Glory	1–2	Adelaide United	Perth
17:05 AWST	Doeglas 53'	Report	Worts 6'; Condon 74'	Stadium: Dorrien Gardens; Attendance: 673; Referee: Georgia Ghirardello

16 January 2021	Sydney	2–0	Western Sydney Wanderers	Sydney
19:40 AEDT	Hawkesby 31' (pen.); Brush 66'	Report		Stadium: Stadium Australia; Attendance: 2,500; Referee: Kelly Jones

17 January 2021	Melbourne Victory	2–3	Melbourne City	Melbourne
16:05 AEDT	Barbieri 47'; Zimmerman 51'	Report	Chidiac 22'; Bunge 25' (o.g.); Withers 86'	Stadium: Epping Stadium; Attendance: 1,034; Referee: Danielle Anderson

17 January 2021	Newcastle Jets	1–1	Brisbane Roar	Newcastle
18:40 AEDT	Andrews 16'	Report	Gielnik 54'	Stadium: McDonald Jones Stadium; Attendance: 1,371; Referee: Isabella Libri

=== Round 5 ===
21 January 2021	Adelaide United	2–1	Melbourne City	Adelaide
18:35 ACDT	Holmes 31', 53'	Report	Checker 90+3'	Stadium: Marden Sports Complex; Attendance: 912; Referee: Isabella Blaess

22 January 2021	Brisbane Roar	6–0	Melbourne Victory	Gold Coast
20:05 AEST	Hecher 26'; Yallop 39'; Freier 64'; Gielnik 76', 90+1'; Heatley 90+5'	Report		Stadium: Gold Coast Sports and Leisure Centre; Attendance: 1,455; Referee: Lara Lee

23 January 2021	Newcastle Jets	4–1	Western Sydney Wanderers	Newcastle
16:05 AEDT	Allan 8', 33'; Andrews 44'; Simon 53'	Report	Yeoman-Dale 11'	Stadium: No. 2 Sportsground; Attendance: 657; Referee: Casey Reibelt

24 January 2021	Canberra United	1–1	Perth Glory	Canberra
16:05 AEDT	Taylor-Young 87'	Report	Anton 86'	Stadium: Viking Park; Attendance: 1,041; Referee: Rebecca Durcau

=== Round 6 ===
29 January 2021	Adelaide United	0–1	Melbourne Victory	Adelaide
18:35 ACDT		Report	Zimmerman 78'	Stadium: Marden Sports Complex; Attendance: 1,105; Referee: Rebecca Durcau

31 January 2021	Melbourne City	2–3	Brisbane Roar	Melbourne
16:05 AEDT	Chidiac 46'; Johnson 73' (pen.)	Report	Polkinghorne 23'; Gielnik 31' (pen.); Hecher 75'	Stadium: AAMI Park; Attendance: 1,975; Referee: Casey Reibelt

31 January 2021	Sydney FC	2–0	Newcastle Jets	Sydney
18:05 AEDT	Vine 32'; Siemsen 61'	Report		Stadium: Cromer Park; Attendance: 1,329; Referee: Kelly Jones

=== Round 7 ===
4 February 2021	Melbourne City	0–2	Sydney FC	Melbourne
19:05 AEDT		Report	Siemsen 51'; Tobin 75'	Stadium: AAMI Park; Referee: Isabella Blaess

7 February 2021	Western Sydney Wanderers	2–2	Adelaide United	Sydney
16:05 AEDT	Hunter 43', 78'	Report	Dawber 33'; Holmes 71'	Stadium: Marconi Stadium; Attendance: 415; Referee: Rebecca Durcau

7 February 2021	Melbourne Victory	4–2	Newcastle Jets	Morwell
18:05 AEDT	Ayres 13', 81'; Bunge 41'; Cooney-Cross 42'	Report	Andrews 48'; Pollicina 76'	Stadium: Latrobe City Stadium; Attendance: 413; Referee: Isabella Libri

8 February 2021	Sydney FC	4–0	Canberra United	Sydney
16:35 AEDT	Hawkesby 16'; Vine 64'; Siemsen 72', 76'	Report		Stadium: Jubilee Oval; Attendance: 1,337; Referee: Georgia Ghirardello

=== Round 8 ===
11 February 2021	Western Sydney Wanderers	1–2	Brisbane Roar	Sydney
19:05 AEDT	Khamis 14'	Report	Gielnik 16', 32' (pen.)	Stadium: Marconi Stadium; Attendance: 494; Referee: Casey Reibelt

14 February 2021	Sydney FC	1–4	Brisbane Roar	Sydney
16:05 AEDT	Wheeler 11'	Report	Yallop 8'; Rankin 16'; Polkinghorne 54'; Whyman 82' (o.g.)	Stadium: Leichhardt Oval; Attendance: 1,126; Referee: Lara Lee

14 February 2021	Adelaide United	2–1	Canberra United	Adelaide
17:35 ACDT	Dawber 11'; Condon 55'	Report	Satchell 45+1'	Stadium: Marden Sports Complex; Attendance: 969; Referee: Isabella Blaess

=== Round 9 ===
30 January 2021	Canberra United	3–0	Western Sydney Wanderers	Canberra
17:05 AEDT	Heyman 3', 34'; Yeoman-Dale 41' (o.g.)	Report		Stadium: Viking Park; Attendance: 1,049; Referee: Lara Lee

18 February 2021	Western Sydney Wanderers	1–0	Perth Glory	Sydney
19:10 AEDT	Russell 45'	Report		Stadium: Marconi Stadium; Attendance: 413; Referee: Rachel Mitchenson

20 February 2021	Newcastle Jets	0–2	Melbourne Victory	Newcastle
15:05 AEDT		Report	Morrison 8'; Zimmerman 30'	Stadium: No. 2 Sportsground; Attendance: 652; Referee: Casey Reibelt

21 February 2021	Sydney FC	2–1	Adelaide United	Sydney
16:05 AEDT	Siemsen 40'; Vine 48'	Report	McNamara 64'	Stadium: Cromer Park; Attendance: 1,087; Referee: Rebecca Durcau

21 February 2021	Brisbane Roar	4–0	Perth Glory	Brisbane
17:05 AEST	Chance 22'; Gielnik 27', 50'; Crummer 87'	Report		Stadium: Lions Stadium; Attendance: 1,639; Referee: Kelly Jones

=== Round 10 ===
25 February 2021	Western Sydney Wanderers	1–0	Melbourne City	Parramatta
19:05 AEDT	Khamis 72'	Report		Stadium: Wanderers Centre of Football; Attendance: 334; Referee: Isabella Blaess

25 February 2021	Perth Glory	2–6	Sydney FC	Perth
18:35 AWST	Lowry 63', 65'	Report	Siemsen 44', 53'; Ibini 48', 90+5'; Wheeler 61', 71'	Stadium: Dorrien Gardens; Attendance: 510; Referee: Isabella Libri

26 February 2021	Newcastle Jets	1–2	Adelaide United	Newcastle
17:05 AEDT	Simon 13'	Report	Dawber 12'; Condon 15'	Stadium: No. 2 Sportsground; Attendance: 652; Referee: Lara Lee

28 February 2021	Melbourne Victory	1–1	Canberra United	Melbourne
16:05 AEDT	Beard 9'	Report	Flannery 45+2'	Stadium: Epping Stadium; Attendance: 562; Referee: Kelly Jones

=== Round 11 ===
4 March 2021	Melbourne Victory	1–0	Western Sydney Wanderers	Melbourne
19:05 AEDT	Longo 43'	Report		Stadium: AAMI Park; Referee: Georgia Ghirardello

6 March 2021	Adelaide United	2–0	Sydney FC	Adelaide
18:35 ACDT	Waldus 5'; Weber 19'	Report		Stadium: Marden Sports Complex; Attendance: 987; Referee: Casey Reibelt

7 March 2021	Canberra United	4–1	Brisbane Roar	Canberra
16:05 AEDT	Flannery 10'; Maher 23'; Heyman 29'; Galic 64'	Report	Gielnik 44'	Stadium: Viking Park; Attendance: 1,161; Referee: Rebecca Durcau

8 March 2021	Perth Glory	0–4	Newcastle Jets	Perth
18:35 AWST		Report	Pollicina 29'; Franco 36', 47'; Allan 83'	Stadium: Dorrien Gardens; Attendance: 310; Referee: Rachel Mitchenson

=== Round 12 ===
11 March 2021	Melbourne City	0–4	Western Sydney Wanderers	Melbourne
18:05 AEDT		Report	Henry 12', 26'; Galea 82', 90+3'	Stadium: Frank Holohan Soccer Complex; Attendance: 547; Referee: Casey Reibelt

12 March 2021	Perth Glory	2–3	Canberra United	Canberra
18:05 AEDT	Doeglas 41'; Jukic 71'	Report	Flannery 36'; Heyman 54', 90+5'	Stadium: Viking Park; Attendance: 942; Referee: Lara Lee

12 March 2021	Brisbane Roar	4–2	Adelaide United	Brisbane
20:05 AEST	Hecher 22'; Gielnik 62', 72', 80'	Report	Dawber 34', 87'	Stadium: Lions Stadium; Attendance: 1,791; Referee: Isabella Blaess

14 March 2021	Melbourne City	1–0	Newcastle Jets	Melbourne
16:05 AEDT	Kira 42'	Report		Stadium: Kingston Heath Soccer Complex; Attendance: 326; Referee: Isabella Libri

16 March 2021	Perth Glory	0–1	Melbourne Victory	Perth
18:35 AWST		Report	Longo 62'	Stadium: Dorrien Gardens; Attendance: 250; Referee: Rebecca Durcau

=== Round 13 ===
19 March 2021	Perth Glory	0–1	Melbourne City	Perth
18:35 AWST		Report	Dobson 67'	Stadium: Dorrien Gardens; Attendance: 271; Referee: Kelly Jones

20 March 2021	Newcastle Jets	0–1	Canberra United	Newcastle
17:35 AEDT		Report	Heyman 22'	Stadium: No. 2 Sportsground; Attendance: 437; Referee: Rachel Mitchenson

21 March 2021	Adelaide United	3–1	Western Sydney Wanderers	Adelaide
15:35 ACDT	I. Hodgson 18'; Waldus 50'; Worts 63'	Report	Price 4'	Stadium: Coopers Stadium; Attendance: 5,159; Referee: Lara Lee

=== Round 14 ===
25 March 2021	Melbourne City	2–1	Perth Glory	Melbourne
18:05 AEDT	Dobson 63'; Chidiac 79'	Report	Charalambous 90+5'	Stadium: Frank Holohan Soccer Complex; Attendance: 454; Referee: Kate Jacewicz

26 March 2021	Canberra United	0–0	Sydney FC	Canberra
17:35 AEDT		Report		Stadium: Viking Park; Attendance: 1,411; Referee: Rebecca Durcau

28 March 2021	Melbourne Victory	6–0	Perth Glory	Melbourne
16:05 AEDT	Ayres 21', 35'; Bunge 48'; Zimmerman 53'; Cooney-Cross 60', 76'	Report		Stadium: Epping Stadium; Attendance: 508; Referee: Rebecca Mackie

28 March 2021	Brisbane Roar	3–0	Newcastle Jets	Brisbane
17:05 AEST	Torpey 41'; Gielnik 47'; Hecher 81'	Report		Stadium: Lions Stadium; Attendance: 1,895; Referee: Georgia Ghirardello

31 March 2021	Sydney	2–1	Melbourne Victory	Sydney
19:35 AEDT	Polias 29'; Ibini 73' (pen.)	Report	Cooney-Cross 90+5'	Stadium: Cromer Park; Attendance: 1,111; Referee: Casey Reibelt

== Finals series ==
=== Semi-finals ===
4 April 2021	Brisbane Roar	2–6	Melbourne Victory	Brisbane
16:00 AEST	Chance 43'; Yallop 74'	Report	De Vanna 23', 61'; Zimmerman 45'; Ayres 47', 87', 90+6'	Stadium: Lions Stadium; Attendance: 1,985; Referee: Lara Lee

5 April 2021	Sydney FC	3–0	Canberra United	Sydney
15:00 AEST	Hawkesby 15'; Wheeler 64'; Green 73'	Report		Stadium: Netstrata Jubilee Stadium; Referee: Isabella Blaess

=== Grand final ===
11 April 2021
16:00 AEST

Sydney FC	0–1 (a.e.t.)	Melbourne Victory
	Report	Cooney-Cross 120'

Netstrata Jubilee Stadium, Sydney
Attendance: 4,619
Referee: Rebecca Durcau

== Regular season statistics ==
=== Leading goalscorers ===
Rank	Player	Club	Goals
1	(Australia) Emily Gielnik	Brisbane Roar	13
2	(Australia) Michelle Heyman	Canberra United	10
3	(Australia) Remy Siemsen	Sydney FC	7
4	(Australia) Tara Andrews	Newcastle Jets	5
4	(Australia) Melina Ayres	Melbourne Victory	5
4	(Australia) Kyra Cooney-Cross	Melbourne Victory	5
4	(Australia) Chelsie Dawber	Adelaide United	5
4	(United States) Catherine Zimmerman	Melbourne Victory	5
9	(Australia) Emily Condon	Adelaide United	4
9	(Australia) Nickoletta Flannery	Canberra United	4
9	(Australia) Rosie Galea	Western Sydney Wanderers	4
9	(Brazil) Mariel Hecher	Brisbane Roar	4
9	(Australia) Princess Ibini-Isei	Sydney FC	4
9	(Australia) Cortnee Vine	Sydney FC	4

=== Hat-tricks ===
Player	For	Against	Result	Date	Ref.
(Australia) Michelle Heyman	Canberra United	Adelaide United	4–3 (H)	30 December 2020	
(Australia) Emily Gielnik	Brisbane Roar	Adelaide United	4–2 (H)	12 March 2021	

Key
(H)	Home team

== Finals series statistics ==
=== Hat-tricks ===
Player	For	Against	Result	Date	Ref.
(Australia) Melina Ayres	Melbourne Victory	Brisbane Roar	6–2 (A)	4 April 2021	

Notes

- (A) – Away team

== End-of-season awards ==
The following end of the season awards were announced at the 2020–21 Dolan Warren Awards night on 23 June 2021.

- Julie Dolan Medal – Michelle Heyman (Canberra United)
- NAB Young Footballer of the Year – Kyra Cooney-Cross (Melbourne Victory)
- Golden Boot Award – Emily Gielnik (Brisbane Roar) (13 goals)
- Goalkeeper of the Year – Teagan Micah (Melbourne City)
- Coach of the Year – Jeff Hopkins (Melbourne Victory)
- Fair Play Award – Brisbane Roar
- Referee of the Year – Rebecca Durcau
- Goal of the Year – Lisa De Vanna (Melbourne Victory v Melbourne City, 10 January 2021)

== See also ==
- W-League transfers for 2020–21 season
- 2020–21 Canberra United W-League season
- 2020–21 Newcastle Jets W-League season
- 2020–21 Sydney FC W-League season
