= Ayesha Norrie =

Australian soccer player

Personal information
- Full name: Ayesha Norrie
- Date of birth: 29 March 1997 (age 29)
- Place of birth: Australia
- Position: Midfielder

Senior career*
Years	Team	Apps	(Gls)
2013–2016	Brisbane Roar	25	(0)
2016–2017	Melbourne Victory	9	(0)
2017–2018	Brisbane Roar	7	(0)
2018–2019	LA Galaxy OC	4	(0)
2019–2020	Perth Glory	8	(1)
2020–2021	Gold Coast United	30	(10)
2021–2024	Brisbane Roar	49	(4)

International career
- Australia U-17
- Australia U-20
- * Club domestic league appearances and goals as of 28 May 2024

Ayesha Norrie (born 29 March 1997) is an Australian soccer player, who last played for Brisbane Roar. She has previously played for Melbourne Victory and Perth Glory in the Australian W-League. She has represented Australia on the under-17 and under-20 national teams.

== Club career ==
=== Brisbane Roar, 2013–2016 ===
Norrie signed with Brisbane Roar in 2013. She made her debut on 9 November 2013 in a match against Canberra United. She made six appearances for the team during the 2013–14 W-League season. Brisbane finished in fourth place during the regular season with a 7–3–2 record earning a berth to the playoffs.

Returning to the Roar for the 2014–15 W-League season, Norrie made eight appearances for the team. The Roar finished in sixth place during the regular season with a 4–6–2 record. Norrie made 11 appearances for the team during the 2015–16 W-League season. Brisbane finished in fourth place during the regular season with a 5–6–1 record and advanced to the playoffs. During the semifinal match against regular season champions Melbourne City, Brisbane was defeated 5–4 in a penalty kick shootout after 120 minutes of regular and overtime produced no goals for either side.

=== Melbourne Victory, 2016–2017 ===
In October 2016, Norrie joined Melbourne Victory.

=== Brisbane Roar, 2017–2018 ===
On 22 September 2017, Norrie returned to Brisbane Roar.

=== LA Galaxy OC, 2018–2019 ===
In May 2018, Norrie joined United Women's Soccer expansion club LA Galaxy OC ahead of their inaugural season.

=== Perth Glory, 2019–2020 ===
Norrie returned to Australia, joining W-League club Perth Glory.

=== Gold Coast United, 2020–2021 ===
In July 2020, Norrie joined Gold Coast United.

=== Brisbane Roar, 2021–2024 ===
In September 2021, Norrie returned once again to Brisbane Roar, as part of coach's Garrath McPherson push to rely on local talent. In August 2024, after three seasons captaining the team, Norrie left Brisbane Roar.

== International career ==
Norrie has represented Australia on the under-17 and under-20 national teams.
