= Hollie Palmer =

Australian soccer player

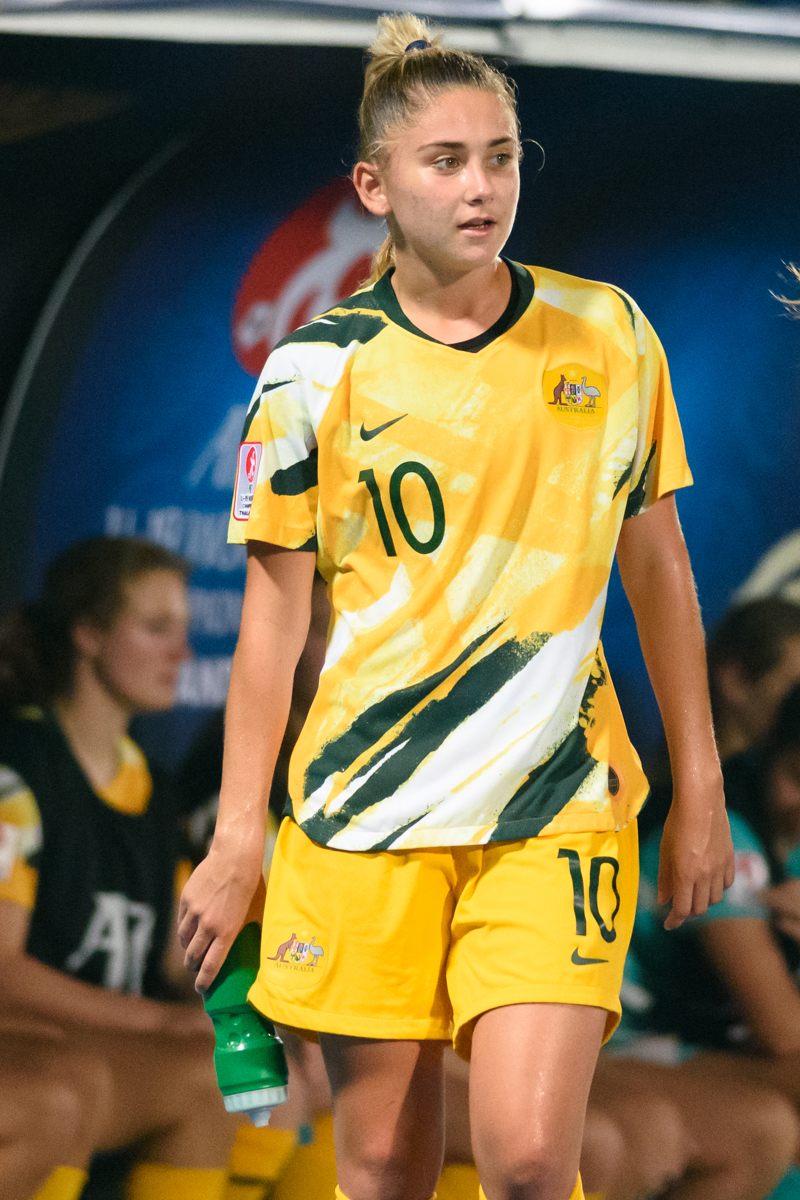

Personal information
- Full name: Hollie Palmer
- Date of birth: 1 March 2001 (age 25)
- Place of birth: Sunnybank, Queensland, Australia
- Height: 1.62 m (5 ft 4 in)
- Position: Midfielder

Team information
- Current team: Gold Coast Knights

Youth career
- 2016–2020: Brisbane Roar

Senior career*
Years	Team	Apps	(Gls)
2017–2020	Brisbane Roar	27	(2)
2020–2021	Melbourne City	8	(0)
2021–2024	Brisbane Roar	46	(2)
2025	Perth Glory	3	(0)
2025–	Gold Coast Knights		

International career^{‡}
2019–2020	Australia U-20	4	(0)
- * Club domestic league appearances and goals as of 28 May 2024 ‡ National team caps and goals as of 25 August 2021

Hollie Palmer (born 1 March 2001) is an Australian women's footballer who plays as a midfielder for Australian club Gold Coast Knights.

== Club career ==
=== Brisbane Roar ===
In October 2017 at the age of 16, Palmer played her first W-League game for Brisbane Roar on debut. She came on the field as a substitute for Allira Toby against Sydney FC which resulted in a 3–1 win.

In the upcoming December 2018, there were six potential contenders for the NAB Young Footballer of the Month in the W-League for November. Later, she was not claimed for the NAB Young Footballer of the Month as Ellie Carpenter won the award.

=== Melbourne City ===
In November 2020, Palmer joined Melbourne City.

=== Return to Brisbane Roar ===
After a season in Melbourne, Palmer returned to Brisbane Roar as part of coach Garrath McPherson's tactic of signing homegrown players. In August 2024, Palmer departed the club at the conclusion of her contract.

=== Perth Glory ===
Perth Glory announced Palmer as an injury replacement signing on 28 February 2025.

=== Gold Coast Knights ===
In June 2025, Palmer joined Gold Coast Knights.

== International career ==
In April 2019, Hollie Palmer was named in the Young Matildas 23-player squad for the 2019 AFC U-19 Women's Championship. She played four games in the tournament.
