= Anna Margraf =

Australian soccer player (born 2001)

Personal information
- Full name: Anna Magano Margraf
- Date of birth: 7 May 2001 (age 25)
- Place of birth: Himmelkron, Germany
- Position: Forward

Team information
- Current team: Borussia Mönchengladbach
- Number: 10

Senior career*
| Years | Team | Apps | (Gls) |
| 2018–2022 | Brisbane Roar | 29 | (3) |
| 2022–2023 | SV Meppen | 22 | (2) |
| 2023–2024 | Sporting de Huelva | 11 | (0) |
| 2024–2026 | Carl Zeiss Jena | 19 | (0) |
| 2026– | Borussia Mönchengladbach | 0 | (0) |
- * Club domestic league appearances and goals as of 18 August 2024

Anna Magano Margraf (born 7 May 2001) is a soccer player who plays as a forward for 2. Frauen-Bundesliga club Borussia Mönchengladbach. She previously played for A-League Women club Brisbane Roar, Frauen-Bundesliga clubs SV Meppen Carl Zeiss Jena, and Liga F club Sporting de Huelva. Born in Germany, she was raised in Australia.

== Early life ==
Margraf was born on 7 May 2001 in Himmelkron, Bavaria, Germany, and moved to Australia with her family aged three. She is of German Namibian descent. Growing up in Alstonville, New South Wales, she was mentored by her older brother Moritz, who plays for Grange Thistle in Brisbane, Queensland.
