= Shea Connors =

American soccer player

Personal information
- Full name: Shea Hastings Connors
- Date of birth: April 12, 1996 (age 30)
- Place of birth: New Haven, Connecticut
- Height: 5 ft 7 in (1.70 m)
- Position: Forward

Team information
- Current team: Tampa Bay Sun
- Number: 9

College career
Years	Team	Apps	(Gls)
2014–2017	St. John's Red Storm	73	(8)

Senior career*
Years	Team	Apps	(Gls)
2018	KR	16	(3)
2019	Logan Lightning	15	(25)
2020	Brisbane Roar	2	(1)
2020	Logan Lightning	17	(11)
2021	Lions FC	16	(39)
2021–2023	Brisbane Roar	31	(13)
2023	San Diego Wave	1	(0)
2023–2025	Sydney FC	33	(2)
2026–	Tampa Bay Sun	13	(5)
- * Club domestic league appearances and goals as of 00:55, November 7, 2026 (UTC)

Shea Hastings Connors (born April 12, 1996) is an American professional soccer player who plays as a forward for USL Super League club Tampa Bay Sun FC. She has previously played in Australia, including for A-League Women clubs Sydney FC and the Brisbane Roar.

== Early life ==
She grew up in New Haven, Connecticut, and went to college in St. John's University. While playing for the Red Storm, she was selected for the All-Big East Team.

== Club career ==
In 2018, Connors signed to play for Knattspyrnufélag Reykjavíkur in Iceland's top division.

Connors then moved to Queensland, Australia to play in the National Premier League with the Logan Lightning where she scored 25 goals in 15 matches which consisted of 5 hat-tricks including a 6-goal haul.

Following these performances, Connors was recruited to the Brisbane Roar for the end of the 2019–20 W-League to help with their unsuccessful push for the finals. In March 2020, Connors left Brisbane Roar and returned to Logan Lightning. In August 2021, after scoring 78 goals in the NPLW, Connors left Lions FC and re-joined Brisbane Roar.

In June 2023, Connors joined American club San Diego Wave as a replacement player. A couple of months later she returned to Australia, joining reigning champions Sydney FC. In July 2025, she was released by the club.

On April 21, 2026, USL Super League club Tampa Bay Sun FC announced the signing of Connors.
