= 2012–13 Canberra United FC (women) season =

Canberra United
2012–13 season
- Chairman: Kate Lundy
- Head Coach: Jitka Klimková
- Stadium: McKellar Park; Deakin Stadium
- W-League: 5th
- W-League Finals: DNQ
- International Women's Club Championship: Fourth place
- Top goalscorer: League: Caitlin Munoz (4); All: Caitlin Munoz; Hayley Raso (4 each)
- Highest home attendance: 782 vs. Adelaide United (3 November 2012); W-League
- Lowest home attendance: 564 vs. Western Sydney Wanderers (5 January 2013); W-League
- Average home league attendance: 699
- Biggest win: 5–0 vs. Newcastle Jets (A) (27 October 2012); W-League; 5–0 vs. Western Sydney Wanderers (H) (8 January 2013); W-League
- Biggest defeat: 0–4 vs. INAC Kobe Leonessa (N) (22 November 2012); International Women's Club Championship; 1–5 vs. Brisbane Roar (12 January 2013); W-League

The 2012–13 season was Canberra United Football Club's fifth season, in the W-League. Canberra United finished 5th in their W-League season.

== Players ==
Note: Flags indicate national team as defined under FIFA eligibility rules; some limited exceptions apply. Players may hold more than one non-FIFA nationality.

No.	Pos.	Nation	Player
1	GK	AUS	Mackenzie Arnold
2	DF	AUS	Caitlin Cooper
3	FW	AUS	Georgia Yeoman-Dale
4	DF	AUS	Christine Walters
5	DF	AUS	Grace Field
6	FW	AUS	Caitlin Munoz
7	DF	AUS	Ellie Brush
8	MF	AUS	Hayley Raso
9	MF	AUS	Grace Gill
10	MF	AUS	Snez Veljanovska
11	FW	AUS	Michelle Heyman

No.	Pos.	Nation	Player
12	DF	AUS	Sally Rojahn
13	DF	AUS	Nicole Begg
14	FW	AUS	Ashleigh Sykes
15	MF	AUS	Sally Shipard
16	DF	AUS	Catherine Brown
17	DF	GER	Ariane Hingst
18	FW	AUS	Sammie Wood
19	MF	AUS	Jennifer Bisset
20	GK	AUS	Trudy Burke
23	MF	USA	Kristie Mewis

== Transfers ==
=== Transfers in ===
No.	Position	Name	From	Type/fee	Date	Ref.
1	GK	Mackenzie Arnold	Perth Glory	Free transfer	15 August 2012	
17	DF	(Germany) Ariane Hingst	Newcastle Jets	Free transfer	29 August 2012	
5	DF	Grace Field	(Australia) Woden Valley	Free transfer	2 October 2012	
16	DF	Catherine Brown	(Australia) Woden Valley	Free transfer	2 October 2012	
18	FW	Sammie Wood	(Australia) Canberra FC	Free transfer	2 October 2012	
20	GK	Trudy Burke	(Australia) Illawarra Stingrays	Free transfer	2 October 2012	
21	FW	(United States) Nikki Washington	Free agent	Free transfer	1 December 2012	
23	MF	(United States) Kristie Mewis	(United States) Boston College Eagles	Free transfer	1 March 2013	

=== Transfers out ===
No.	Position	Name	To	Type/fee	Date	Ref.
20	GK	(New Zealand) Aroon Clansey	(England) Liverpool	Free transfer	3 February 2012	
18	DF	(United States) Taryn Hemmings	(United States) Boston Breakers	Free transfer	7 March 2012	
1	GK	Lydia Williams	Free agent	Free transfer	16 August 2012	
16	FW	(New Zealand) Emma Kete	Sydney FC	Free transfer	2 October 2012	
—	DF	Ellyse Perry	Sydney FC	Free transfer	2 October 2012	
21	FW	(United States) Nikki Washington	Free agent	Free transfer	4 January 2013	

== Competitions ==
=== Overall record ===
Competition	First match	Last match	Starting round	Final position	Record							
Competition	First match	Last match	Starting round	Final position	Pld	W	D	L	GF	GA	GD	Win %
W-League	20 October 2012	12 January 2013	Matchday 1	5th	12	5	3	4	25	20	+5	41.67
International Women's Club Championship	22 November 2012	25 November 2012	Semi-finals	Fourth place	2	0	0	2	3	8	−5	0.00
Total					14	5	3	6	28	28	+0	35.71

Source: Competitions

=== W-League ===
==== League table ====
Pos	Team	Pld	W	D	L	GF	GA	GD	Pts	Qualification
1	Brisbane Roar	12	8	2	2	28	15	+13	26	Qualification to Finals series
2	Perth Glory	12	7	3	2	34	20	+14	24	Qualification to Finals series
3	Melbourne Victory	12	7	2	3	26	14	+12	23	Qualification to Finals series
4	Sydney FC (C)	12	6	2	4	30	24	+6	20	Qualification to Finals series
5	Canberra United	12	5	3	4	25	20	+5	18	
6	Western Sydney Wanderers	12	4	1	7	19	23	−4	13	
7	Newcastle Jets	12	1	3	8	15	33	−18	6	
8	Adelaide United	12	2	0	10	12	40	−28	6	

Source: au.soccerway.com
Rules for classification: 1) points; 2) goal difference; 3) number of goals scored.
(C) Champions

==== Results summary ====
Overall								Home						Away					
Pld	W	D	L	GF	GA	GD	Pts	W	D	L	GF	GA	GD	W	D	L	GF	GA	GD
12	5	3	4	25	20	+5	18	4	1	1	12	4	+8	1	2	3	13	16	−3

Source: worldfootball.net

==== Results by round ====
Round	1	2	3	4	5	7	6	8	9	10	11	12
Ground	H	A	H	A	A	A	H	H	H	A	H	A
Result	D	W	W	D	L	L	W	W	L	D	W	L
Position	5	2	1	2	3	5	2	3	4	5	4	5
Points	1	4	7	8	8	8	11	14	14	15	18	18

Source: worldfootball.net
A = Away; H = Home; W = Win; D = Draw; L = Loss

==== Matches ====
The league fixtures were announced on 18 September 2012.

Win Draw Loss

20 October 2012 1	Canberra United	0–0	Brisbane Roar	Canberra
14:00 AEDT		Report		Stadium: McKellar Park; Referee: Kate Jacewicz

27 October 2012 2	Newcastle Jets	0–5	Canberra United	Newcastle
14:00 AEDT		Report	Raso 74'; Heyman 84'; Hingst 86'; Munoz 87'; Sykes 90+5'	Stadium: Wanderers Oval; Attendance: 1,000; Referee: Kirralee Gardener

3 November 2012 3	Canberra United	3–1	Adelaide United	Canberra
16:00 AEDT	Cooper 63'; Brush 78'; Wood 84'	Report	Quigley 38'	Stadium: McKellar Park; Attendance: 782

11 November 2012 4	Western Sydney Wanderers	1–1	Canberra United	Sydney
14:00 AEDT	Allen 23'	Report	Munoz 73'	Stadium: Campbelltown Stadium; Referee: Kate Jacewicz

17 November 2012 5	Melbourne Victory	3–0	Canberra United	Melbourne
15:00 AEDT	Fishlock 28'; McDonald 45'; Barilla 80'	Report		Stadium: Wembley Park; Attendance: 575; Referee: Casey Reibelt

1 December 2012 7	Sydney FC	4–3	Canberra United	Sydney
10:00 AEDT	Simon 4', 77'; Kerr 16'; Kete 90+4'	Report	Yeoman-Dale 32'; Raso 60'; Washington 84'	Stadium: Leichhardt Oval; Referee: Kate Jacewicz

5 December 2012 6	Canberra United	2–1	Perth Glory	Canberra
18:00 AEDT	Munoz 5' (pen.); Washington 53'	Report	Sutton 9'	Stadium: Deakin Stadium; Attendance: 623; Referee: Peta McCallum
Note: Match originally scheduled for 24 November 2012, this match was postponed due to Canberra United's participation in the 2012 International Women's Club Championship. It was rescheduled for 5 December 2012.

8 December 2012 8	Canberra United	1–0	Newcastle Jets	Canberra
16:00 AEDT	Sykes 34'	Report		Stadium: Deakin Stadium; Attendance: 794; Referee: Rebecca Durcau

15 December 2012 9	Canberra United	1–2	Melbourne Victory	Canberra
14:00 AEDT	Bisset 50'	Report	Jackson 31'; Fishlock 90'	Stadium: McKellar Park; Attendance: 719; Referee: Casey Reibelt

22 December 2012 10	Perth Glory	3–3	Canberra United	Perth
16:00 AWST	Luik 34'; Milne 35'; D'Ovidio 49'	Report	Washington 24'; Raso 44'; Cooper 70'	Stadium: Initga Stadium; Referee: Kate Jacewicz

8 January 2013 11	Canberra United	5–0	Western Sydney Wanderers	Canberra
14:00 AEDT	Raso 34'; Heyman 44'; Munoz 74'; Hart 82' (o.g.); Mewis 89'	Report		Stadium: McKellar Park; Attendance: 712 (Note: Attendance was 564 at the abandonment of the match.); Referee: Rebecca Durcau
Note: Match originally scheduled for 14:00 AEDT, but delayed due to lightning. It was rescheduled for 19:30 AEDT. Match then abandoned after 36 minutes due to lightning on 5 January 2013. It was rescheduled and replayed for 8 January 2013.

12 January 2013 12	Brisbane Roar	5–1	Canberra United	Brisbane
10:30 AEST	Gorry 11'; Butt 38', 41' (pen.), 70'; Gielnik 65'	Report	Mewis 45+4'	Stadium: Queensland Sport and Athletics Centre; Referee: Katie Patterson

=== International Women's Club Championship ===
22 November 2012 Semi-finals	INAC Kobe Leonessa (Japan)	4–0	(Australia) Canberra United	Saitama, Japan
19:20 JST	Goebel-Yanez 17', 82'; Takase 35'; Ohno 54'	Report		Stadium: Urawa Komaba Stadium; Attendance: 2,027; Referee: Pannipar Kamnueng (Thailand)

25 November 2012 Third place play-off	Canberra United (Australia)	3–4	(Japan) NTV Beleza	Saitama, Japan
13:30 JST	Bisset 7'; Heyman 33'; Raso 66'	Report	Iwashimizu 11', 90+2'; Ito 42'; Asano Nagasato 78'	Stadium: NACK5 Stadium Omiya; Attendance: 2,711; Referee: Pannipar Kamnueng (Thailand)

== Statistics ==
=== Appearances and goals ===
Includes all competitions. Players with no appearances not included in the list.

No.	Pos.	Nat.	Name	W-League		International Women's Club Championship		Total					
No.	Pos.	Nat.	Name	Apps	Goals	Apps	Goals	Apps	Goals				
No.	Pos.	Nat.	Name	1	GK	(Australia)	Mackenzie Arnold	10	0	0	0	10	0
2	DF	(Australia)	Caitlin Cooper	10+1	2	2	0	13	2				
3	FW	(Australia)	Georgia Yeoman-Dale	8+4	1	2	0	14	1				
4	DF	(Australia)	Christine Walters	4+1	0	0+2	0	7	0				
5	DF	(Australia)	Grace Field	0+2	0	0+1	0	3	0				
6	FW	(Australia)	Caitlin Munoz	12	4	2	0	14	4				
7	DF	(Australia)	Ellie Brush	11	2	2	0	13	2				
8	MF	(Australia)	Hayley Raso	8+2	3	0+2	1	12	4				
9	MF	(Australia)	Grace Gill	1+2	0	2	0	5	0				
10	MF	(Australia)	Snez Veljanovska	0+2	0	0+1	0	3	0				
11	FW	(Australia)	Michelle Heyman	11	2	2	1	13	3				
12	DF	(Australia)	Sally Rojahn	1+1	0	0+1	0	3	0				
13	DF	(Australia)	Nicole Begg	12	1	2	0	14	1				
14	FW	(Australia)	Ashleigh Sykes	4+2	0	0	0	6	0				
15	MF	(Australia)	Sally Shipard	2+3	0	1+1	0	7	0				
16	DF	(Australia)	Catherine Brown	6+4	0	2	0	12	0				
17	DF	(Germany)	Ariane Hingst	12	1	1	0	13	1				
18	FW	(Australia)	Sammie Wood	0+7	1	0+2	0	9	1				
19	MF	(Australia)	Jennifer Bisset	12	1	2	1	14	2				
20	GK	(Australia)	Trudy Burke	0	0	2	0	2	0				
23	MF	(United States)	Kristie Mewis	0+2	2	0	0	2	2				
Player(s) transferred out but featured this season
21	FW	(United States)	Nikki Washington	4+1	3	0	0	5	3				

=== Disciplinary record ===
Includes all competitions. The list is sorted by squad number when total cards are equal. Players with no cards not included in the list.

Rank	No.	Pos.	Nat.	Name	W-League			International Women's Club Championship			Total							
Rank	No.	Pos.	Nat.	Name	Yellow card	(yellow card) (yellow-red card)	Red card	Yellow card	(yellow card) (yellow-red card)	Red card	Yellow card	(yellow card) (yellow-red card)	Red card					
Rank	No.	Pos.	Nat.	Name	1	7	DF	(Australia)	Ellie Brush	1	1	0	1	0	0	2	1	0
2	6	FW	(Australia)	Caitlin Munoz	3	0	0	0	0	0	3	0	0					
2	19	MF	(Australia)	Jennifer Bisset	3	0	0	0	0	0	3	0	0					
4	1	GK	(Australia)	Mackenzie Arnold	2	0	0	0	0	0	2	0	0					
5	2	DF	(Australia)	Caitlin Cooper	1	0	0	0	0	0	1	0	0					
5	8	MF	(Australia)	Hayley Raso	1	0	0	0	0	0	1	0	0					
5	11	FW	(Australia)	Michelle Heyman	1	0	0	0	0	0	1	0	0					
5	12	DF	(Australia)	Sally Rojahn	1	0	0	0	0	0	1	0	0					
5	13	DF	(Australia)	Nicole Begg	1	0	0	0	0	0	1	0	0					
5	17	DF	(Germany)	Ariane Hingst	1	0	0	0	0	0	1	0	0					
5	18	FW	(Australia)	Sammie Wood	0	0	0	1	0	0	1	0	0					
Total					15	1	0	2	0	0	17	1	0					

=== Clean sheets ===
Includes all competitions. The list is sorted by squad number when total clean sheets are equal. Numbers in parentheses represent games where both goalkeepers participated and both kept a clean sheet; the number in parentheses is awarded to the goalkeeper who was substituted on, whilst a full clean sheet is awarded to the goalkeeper who was on the field at the start of play. Goalkeepers with no clean sheets not included in the list.

Rank	No.	Nat.	Goalkeeper	W-League	International Women's Club Championship	Total
1	1	(Australia)	Mackenzie Arnold	4	0	4
