= 2013–14 Canberra United FC (women) season =

Canberra United
2013–14 season
- Chairman: Kate Lundy
- Head Coach: Liesbeth Migchelsen
- Stadium: McKellar Park
- W-League: 1st
- W-League Finals: Semi-finals
- Top goalscorer: League: Michelle Heyman (7); All: Michelle Heyman (7)
- Highest home attendance: 1,149 vs. Brisbane Roar (15 February 2014); W-League Finals
- Lowest home attendance: 662 vs. Newcastle Jets (1 November 2014); W-League
- Average home league attendance: 796
- Biggest win: 5–0 vs. Newcastle Jets (H) (1 February 2014); W-League
- Biggest defeat: 0–2 vs. Adelaide United (A) (5 January 2014); W-League
Home colours	Away colours

The 2013–14 Canberra United FC season is the club's sixth participation in the W-League, since the league's and club's formation in 2008.

== Players ==
=== Squad information ===
Note: Flags indicate national team as defined under FIFA eligibility rules; some limited exceptions apply. Players may hold more than one non-FIFA nationality.

No.	Pos.	Nation	Player
1	GK	AUS	Lydia Williams
2	DF	AUS	Catherine Brown
3	FW	AUS	Georgia Yeoman-Dale
4	MF	USA	Kendall Fletcher
5	DF	AUS	Grace Field
6	MF	AUS	Caitlin Munoz
7	DF	AUS	Ellie Brush (Vice-Captain)
8	FW	AUS	Meg McLaughlin
9	MF	AUS	Grace Gill
11	FW	AUS	Michelle Heyman

No.	Pos.	Nation	Player
12	DF	AUS	Sally Rojahn
13	DF	AUS	Nicole Sykes (Captain)
14	FW	AUS	Ashleigh Sykes
15	MF	AUS	Sally Shipard
16	MF	USA	Lori Lindsey
17	DF	AUS	Holly Houston
19	MF	AUS	Jennifer Bisset
20	GK	AUS	Trudy Burke
22	FW	USA	Stephanie Ochs

=== Transfers in ===
Note: Flags indicate national team as defined under FIFA eligibility rules; some limited exceptions apply. Players may hold more than one non-FIFA nationality.

No.	Pos.	Nation	Player
8	FW	AUS	Meg McLaughlin (from (Australia) Sydney FC)
16	MF	USA	Lori Lindsey (from (United States) Washington Spirit)
22	FW	USA	Stephanie Ochs (from (United States) Washington Spirit)
4	MF	USA	Kendall Fletcher (from (Sweden) Vittsjö GIK)
17	DF	AUS	Holly Houston (from (Australia) Redlands United Women)
1	GK	AUS	Lydia Williams (from (Sweden) Piteå IF)

=== Transfers out ===
Note: Flags indicate national team as defined under FIFA eligibility rules; some limited exceptions apply. Players may hold more than one non-FIFA nationality.

No.	Pos.	Nation	Player
—	GK	AUS	Mackenzie Arnold (to (Australia) Western Sydney Wanderers)
2	DF	AUS	Caitlin Cooper (to (Australia) Western Sydney Wanderers)
17	MF	GER	Ariane Hingst
23	MF	USA	Kristen Mewis (to (United States) Kansas City)
8	MF	AUS	Hayley Raso (to (Australia) Brisbane Roar)
4	DF	AUS	Christine Walters
18	MF	AUS	Samantha Wood (to (Australia) Canberra FC Women)
10	MF	AUS	Snez Veljanovska

== Technical staff ==
Position	Name
Head coach	(Netherlands) Liesbeth Migchelsen
Assistant coach	(Australia) Raeanne Dower

== Squad statistics ==
=== Disciplinary record ===
N	Pos.	Nat.	Name	Yellow card	Second yellow card	Red card	Notes
1	GK	(Australia)	Lydia Williams	1	0	0	
2	DF	(Australia)	Catherine Brown	2	0	0	
3	FW	(Australia)	Georgia Yeoman-Dale	0	0	0	
4	MF	(United States)	Kendall Fletcher	0	0	0	
5	DF	(Australia)	Grace Field	0	0	0	
6	MF	(Australia)	Caitlin Munoz	0	0	0	
7	DF	(Australia)	Ellie Brush	3	0	0	
8	FW	(Australia)	Meg McLaughlin	0	0	0	
9	MF	(Australia)	Grace Gill	0	0	0	
11	FW	(Australia)	Michelle Heyman	1	0	0	
12	DF	(Australia)	Sally Rojahn	1	0	0	
13	DF	(Australia)	Nicole Sykes	0	0	0	
14	FW	(Australia)	Ashleigh Sykes	0	0	0	
15	MF	(Australia)	Sally Shipard	0	0	0	
16	MF	(United States)	Lori Lindsey	1	0	0	
17	DF	(Australia)	Holly Houston	0	0	0	
19	MF	(Australia)	Jennifer Bisset	2	0	0	
20	GK	(Australia)	Trudy Burke	0	0	0	
22	FW	(United States)	Stephanie Ochs	0	0	0	

Last updated: 10 February 2014
Source: Competitive matches
Only competitive matches
(yellow card) = Number of bookings; (second yellow card) = Number of sending offs after a second yellow card; (red card) = Number of sending offs by a direct red card.

=== Goal scorers ===
Total	Player		Goals per round											
Total	Player		1	2	3	4	5	6	7	8	9	10	11	12
7	(Australia)	Michelle Heyman	2	1	1		1				1		1	
6	(United States)	Stephanie Ochs		1			2	1			1			1
3	(Australia)	Georgia Yeoman-Dale										2	1	
3	(Australia)	Caitlin Munoz			1							1		1
2	(Australia)	Ashleigh Sykes						1			1			
2	(United States)	Lori Lindsey	1									1		
2	(Australia)	Ellie Brush										1	1	
1	(United States)	Kendall Fletcher								1				
1	(Australia)	Sally Shipard											1	
1	(Australia)	Jennifer Bisset											1	
28	Total		3	2	2	0	3	2	0	1	3	5	5	2

== Competitions ==
=== Overall record ===
Competition	First match	Last match	Starting round	Final position	Record							
Competition	First match	Last match	Starting round	Final position	Pld	W	D	L	GF	GA	GD	Win %
W-League	9 November 2013	9 February 2014	Matchday 1	1st	12	9	0	3	28	8	+20	75.00
W-League Finals	15 February 2014		Semi-finals	Semi-finals	1	0	0	1	1	2	−1	0.00
Total					13	9	0	4	29	10	+19	69.23

Source: Competitions

=== W-League ===
==== League table ====
Pos	Team	Pld	W	D	L	GF	GA	GD	Pts	Qualification
1	Canberra United	12	9	0	3	28	8	+20	27	Qualification to Finals series
2	Sydney FC	12	8	2	2	37	14	+23	26	Qualification to Finals series
3	Melbourne Victory (C)	12	7	2	3	23	12	+11	23	Qualification to Finals series
4	Brisbane Roar	12	7	2	3	22	16	+6	23	Qualification to Finals series
5	Perth Glory	12	5	0	7	17	31	−14	15	
6	Adelaide United	12	3	4	5	12	15	−3	13	
7	Western Sydney Wanderers	12	2	3	7	17	23	−6	9	
8	Newcastle Jets	12	0	1	11	10	47	−37	1	

Source: au.soccerway.com
Rules for classification: 1) points; 2) goal difference; 3) number of goals scored.
(C) Champions

==== Results summary ====
Overall								Home						Away					
Pld	W	D	L	GF	GA	GD	Pts	W	D	L	GF	GA	GD	W	D	L	GF	GA	GD
12	9	0	3	28	8	+20	27	5	0	1	17	3	+14	4	0	2	11	5	+6

Source: worldfootball.net

==== Results by round ====
Round	1	2	4	5	6	7	8	9	10	3^{1}	11	12
Ground	A	H	H	A	A	A	A	H	H	H	H	A
Result	W	W	L	W	W	L	L	W	W	W	W	W
Position	3	2	4	2	2	3	4	4	4	3	2	1
Points	3	6	6	9	12	12	12	15	18	21	24	27

Source: worldfootball.net
A = Away; H = Home; B = Bye; W = Win; D = Draw; L = Loss
Notes:
- ^{1} Matchday 3 (vs. Sydney FC) was rescheduled, due to the Sydney FC's participation in the 2013 International Women's Club Championship.

==== Matches ====
Win Draw Loss

9 November 2013 1	Brisbane Roar	0–3	Canberra United	Brisbane
15:00 AEST		Report	Lindsey 8'; Heyman 38', 49'	Stadium: A.J. Kelly Park; Referee: Casey Reibelt

17 November 2013 2	Canberra United	2–0	Western Sydney Wanderers	Canberra
15:00 AEDT	Heyman 25'; Ochs 41'	Report		Stadium: McKellar Park; Attendance: 1,007; Referee: Kate Jacewicz

8 December 2013 4	Canberra United	0–1	Brisbane Roar	Canberra
15:00 AEDT		Report	Kellond-Knight 8'	Stadium: McKellar Park; Attendance: 803; Referee: Kirralee Andruschak

14 December 2013 5	Newcastle Jets	0–3	Canberra United	Newcastle
15:00 AEDT		Report	Ochs 11', 62'; Heyman 12'	Stadium: Wanderers Oval; Referee: Katie Patterson

21 December 2013 6	Perth Glory	0–2	Canberra United	Perth
17:00 AWST		Report	Sykes 51'; Ochs 90+2'	Stadium: Percy Doyle Reserve; Referee: Casey Reibelt

5 January 2014 7	Adelaide United	2–0	Canberra United	Adelaide
15:00 ACDT	Woods 10'; Quigley 13' (pen.)	Report		Stadium: Burton Park; Referee: Casey Reibelt

12 January 2014 8	Melbourne Victory	2–1	Canberra United	Melbourne
15:00 AEDT	De Vanna 47'; Friend 83'	Report	Fletcher 66'	Stadium: Lakeside Stadium; Referee: Kirralee Andruschak

19 January 2014 9	Canberra United	3–0	Adelaide United	Canberra
15:00 AEDT	Heyman 16'; Ochs 32'; Sykes 61'	Report		Stadium: McKellar Park; Attendance: 724; Referee: Casey Reibelt

26 January 2014 10	Canberra United	5–1	Perth Glory	Canberra
15:00 AEDT	Brush 37'; Munoz 41'; Lindsey 81'; Yeoman-Dale 90', 90+2'	Report	Gill 84'	Stadium: McKellar Park; Attendance: 714

29 January 2014 3	Canberra United	2–1	Sydney FC	Canberra
19:00 AEDT	Heyman 9'; Munoz 57' (pen.)	Report	Rollason 35'	Stadium: McKellar Park; Attendance: 865; Referee: Kirralee Andruschak
Note: Match originally scheduled for 30 November at 16:00 AEDT, but rescheduled due to Sydney FC's participation in the 2013 International Women's Club Championship. It was rescheduled for 29 January at 19:00 AEDT.

1 February 2014 11	Canberra United	5–0	Newcastle Jets	Canberra
16:00 AEDT	Heyman 7'; Shipard 10'; Brush 28'; Yeoman-Dale 47'; Bisset 63'	Report		Stadium: McKellar Park; Attendance: 662; Referee: Rebecca Durcau

9 February 2014 12	Sydney FC	1–2	Canberra United	Sydney
17:15 AEDT	Kerr 24'	Report	Munoz 13' (pen.); Ochs 60'	Stadium: Sydney United Sports Centre; Referee: Lara Lee
Note: Match originally set to take place at Jubilee Oval, but relocated due to scheduling of matches ahead of the W-League Finals. It was relocated to Sydney United Sports Centre.

==== Finals series ====
15 February 2014 Semi-finals	Canberra United	1–2	Brisbane Roar	Canberra
15:00 AEDT	Munoz 23'	Report	Carroll 4'; Kellond-Knight 58'	Stadium: McKellar Park; Attendance: 1,148; Referee: Kirralee Andruschak

== Awards ==
- Player of the Week (Round 2) - Michelle Heyman
- Player of the Week (Round 10) - Kendall Fletcher
