= 2011–12 Canberra United FC (women) season =

Canberra United
2011–12 season
- Chairman: Kate Lundy
- Head Coach: Jitka Klimková
- Stadium: McKellar Park
- W-League: 1st
- W-League Finals: Winners
- Top goalscorer: League: Michelle Heyman (12); All: Michelle Heyman (15)
- Highest home attendance: 2,512 vs. Brisbane Roar (28 January 2012); W-League Grand Final
- Lowest home attendance: 732 vs. Melbourne Victory (12 November 2011); W-League
- Average home league attendance: 810
- Biggest win: 5–0 vs. Adelaide United (7 January 2012); W-League

The 2011–12 season was Canberra United Football Club's fourth season, in the W-League. Canberra United finished 1st in their W-League season, fishing as winners in the Grand Final.

== Players ==
Note: Flags indicate national team as defined under FIFA eligibility rules; some limited exceptions apply. Players may hold more than one non-FIFA nationality.

No.	Pos.	Nation	Player
1	GK	AUS	Lydia Williams
2	DF	AUS	Caitlin Cooper
3	FW	AUS	Georgia Yeoman-Dale
4	DF	AUS	Christine Walters
5	MF	AUS	Kahlia Hogg
6	FW	AUS	Caitlin Munoz
7	DF	AUS	Ellie Brush
8	MF	AUS	Hayley Raso
9	MF	AUS	Grace Gill
10	MF	AUS	Snez Veljanovska
11	FW	AUS	Michelle Heyman

No.	Pos.	Nation	Player
12	DF	AUS	Sally Rojahn
13	DF	AUS	Nicole Begg
14	FW	AUS	Ashleigh Sykes
15	MF	AUS	Sally Shipard
16	FW	NZL	Emma Kete
17	MF	AUS	Leah Blayney
18	DF	USA	Taryn Hemmings
19	MF	AUS	Jennifer Bisset
20	GK	NZL	Aroon Clansey
—	DF	AUS	Ellyse Perry

== Transfers and contracts ==
=== Transfers in ===
No.	Position	Name	From	Type/fee	Date	Ref.
20	GK	(New Zealand) Aroon Clansey	(New Zealand) Three Kings United	Free transfer	29 September 2011	
10	MF	Snez Veljanovska	Melbourne Victory	Free transfer	3 October 2011	
17	MF	Leah Blayney	(United States) Boston Breakers	Free transfer	20 October 2011	
18	DF	(United States) Taryn Hemmings	(United States) Boston Breakers	Free transfer	20 October 2011	
16	FW	(New Zealand) Emma Kete	Perth Glory	Free transfer	2 January 2012	

=== Transfers out ===
No.	Position	Name	To	Type/fee	Date	Ref.
17	MF	Leah Blayney	(United States) Boston Breakers	Free transfer	15 April 2011	

== Competitions ==
=== Overall record ===
Competition	First match	Last match	Starting round	Final position	Record							
Competition	First match	Last match	Starting round	Final position	Pld	W	D	L	GF	GA	GD	Win %
W-League	22 October 2011	7 January 2012	Matchday 1	1st	10	7	3	0	23	9	+14	70.00
W-League Finals	21 January 2012	28 January 2012	Semi-finals	Winners	2	2	0	0	4	2	+2	100.00
Total					12	9	3	0	27	11	+16	75.00

Source: Competitions

=== W-League ===
==== League table ====
Pos	Team	Pld	W	D	L	GF	GA	GD	Pts	Qualification
1	Canberra United (C)	10	7	3	0	23	9	+14	24	Qualification to Finals series
2	Brisbane Roar	10	6	3	1	20	11	+9	21	Qualification to Finals series
3	Sydney FC	10	5	2	3	26	8	+18	17	Qualification to Finals series
4	Melbourne Victory	10	5	2	3	21	9	+12	17	Qualification to Finals series
5	Newcastle Jets	10	4	0	6	18	22	−4	12	
6	Perth Glory	10	2	0	8	11	36	−25	6	
7	Adelaide United	10	1	0	9	6	30	−24	3	

Source: au.soccerway.com
Rules for classification: 1) points; 2) goal difference; 3) number of goals scored.
(C) Champions

==== Results summary ====
Overall								Home						Away					
Pld	W	D	L	GF	GA	GD	Pts	W	D	L	GF	GA	GD	W	D	L	GF	GA	GD
10	7	3	0	23	9	+14	24	4	1	0	13	4	+9	3	2	0	10	5	+5

Source: worldfootball.net

==== Results by round ====
Round	1	2	3	4	5	6	7	8	9	10	11	12
Ground	A	H	A	H	H	B	A	H	A	A	H	B
Result	W	W	W	W	W	B	D	D	W	D	W	B
Position	1	1	1	1	1	1	1	1	1	1	1	1
Points	3	6	9	12	15	15	16	17	20	21	24	24

Source: worldfootball.net
A = Away; H = Home; W = Win; D = Draw; L = Loss

==== Matches ====
The league fixtures were announced on 27 September 2011.

Win Draw Loss

22 October 2011 1	Adelaide United	1–4	Canberra United	Adelaide
13:45 ACDT	Quigley 36'	Report	Heyman 2', 82'; Munoz 61', 70'	Stadium: Hindmarsh Stadium; Referee: Stacey Sasopoulos

29 October 2011 2	Canberra United	3–2	Perth Glory	Canberra
15:00 AEDT	Heyman 64', 66', 80'	Report	Kete 21'; Tabain 89'	Stadium: McKellar Park; Referee: Kate Jacewicz

5 November 2011 3	Sydney FC	0–1	Canberra United	Sydney
15:00 AEDT		Report	Sykes 19'	Stadium: Leichhardt Oval; Referee: Kirralee Andruschak

12 November 2011 4	Canberra United	2–1	Melbourne Victory	Canberra
15:00 AEDT	Sykes 24'; Hemmings 39'	Report	Fletcher 78'	Stadium: McKellar Park; Attendance: 732; Referee: Kate Jacewicz

19 November 2011 5	Canberra United	3–1	Newcastle Jets	Canberra
15:00 AEDT	Shipard 29'; Heyman 64', 80'	Report	Simon 77'	Stadium: McKellar Park; Attendance: 887; Referee: Kirralee Andruschak

3 December 2011 7	Brisbane Roar	2–2	Canberra United	Brisbane
15:00 AEST	Burgess 7'; Brush 88' (o.g.)	Report	Shipard 9'; Heyman 78'	Stadium: Cleveland Showgrounds; Referee: Kate Jacewicz

10 December 2011 8	Canberra United	0–0	Sydney FC	Canberra
17:00 AEDT		Report		Stadium: Deakin Stadium; Referee: Casey Reibelt

18 December 2011 9	Newcastle Jets	1–2	Canberra United	Newcastle
15:00 AEDT	Dobson 86'	Report	Hemmings 63'; Heyman 74'	Stadium: Adamstown Oval; Referee: Kirralee Andruschak

30 December 2011 10	Melbourne Victory	1–1	Canberra United	Melbourne
17:00 AEDT	Taylor 20' (pen.)	Report	Heyman 81'	Stadium: Veneto Club; Referee: Catherine Hoffman

7 January 2012 11	Canberra United	5–0	Adelaide United	Canberra
15:00 AEDT	Heyman 28', 34'; Hemmings 83', 85'; Sykes 90+2'	Report		Stadium: McKellar Park; Referee: Rebecca Durcau

==== Finals series ====
21 January 2012 Semi-finals	Canberra United	1–0	Melbourne Victory	Canberra
15:00 AEDT	Heyman 83'	Report		Stadium: McKellar Park; Attendance: 1,785; Referee: Kirralee Andruschak

28 January 2012 Grand Final	Canberra United	3–2	Brisbane Roar	Canberra
15:00 AEDT	Heyman 11', 56'; Sykes 18'	Report	Gielnik 22'; Butt 63' (pen.)	Stadium: McKellar Park; Attendance: 2,512; Referee: Kate Jacewicz

== Statistics ==
=== Appearances and goals ===
Includes all competitions. Players with no appearances not included in the list.

No.	Pos.	Nat.	Name	W-League				Total	
No.	Pos.	Nat.	Name	Regular season		Finals series		Total	
No.	Pos.	Nat.	Name	Apps	Goals	Apps	Goals	Apps	Goals
1	GK	(Australia)	Lydia Williams	10	0	2	0	12	0
2	DF	(Australia)	Caitlin Cooper	10	0	2	0	12	0
3	FW	(Australia)	Georgia Yeoman-Dale	0+6	0	0	0	6	0
4	DF	(Australia)	Christine Walters	1+1	0	0	0	2	0
5	MF	(Australia)	Kahlia Hogg	1+4	0	0	0	5	0
6	FW	(Australia)	Caitlin Munoz	8	2	0+2	0	10	2
7	DF	(Australia)	Ellie Brush	8	0	0	0	8	0
8	MF	(Australia)	Hayley Raso	2+4	0	2	0	8	0
9	MF	(Australia)	Grace Gill	4+3	0	2	0	9	0
10	MF	(Australia)	Snez Veljanovska	2+4	0	0	0	6	0
11	FW	(Australia)	Michelle Heyman	10	12	2	3	12	15
13	DF	(Australia)	Nicole Begg	10	0	2	0	12	0
14	FW	(Australia)	Ashleigh Sykes	10	3	2	1	12	4
15	MF	(Australia)	Sally Shipard	9+1	2	2	0	12	2
16	FW	(New Zealand)	Emma Kete	0+1	0	0+2	0	3	0
18	DF	(United States)	Taryn Hemmings	9+1	4	2	0	12	4
19	MF	(Australia)	Jennifer Bisset	10	0	2	0	12	0
20	GK	(New Zealand)	Aroon Clansey	0+1	0	0	0	1	0
—	DF	(Australia)	Ellyse Perry	6+1	0	0	0	7	0

=== Disciplinary record ===
Includes all competitions. The list is sorted by squad number when total cards are equal. Players with no cards not included in the list.

Rank	No.	Pos.	Nat.	Name	W-League						Total		
Rank	No.	Pos.	Nat.	Name	Regular season			Finals series			Total		
Rank	No.	Pos.	Nat.	Name	Booked	(yellow card) (yellow-red card)	Sent off (straight red)	Booked	(yellow card) (yellow-red card)	Sent off (straight red)	Booked	(yellow card) (yellow-red card)	Sent off (straight red)
1	7	DF	(Australia)	Ellie Brush	3	0	0	0	0	0	3	0	0
2	14	FW	(Australia)	Ashleigh Sykes	2	0	0	0	0	0	2	0	0
3	6	FW	(Australia)	Caitlin Munoz	1	0	0	0	0	0	1	0	0
3	8	MF	(Australia)	Hayley Raso	1	0	0	0	0	0	1	0	0
3	13	DF	(Australia)	Nicole Begg	1	0	0	0	0	0	1	0	0
3	15	MF	(Australia)	Sally Shipard	0	0	0	1	0	0	1	0	0
3	18	DF	(United States)	Taryn Hemmings	1	0	0	0	0	0	1	0	0
3	19	MF	(Australia)	Jennifer Bisset	1	0	0	0	0	0	1	0	0
Total					10	0	0	1	0	0	11	0	0

=== Clean sheets ===
Includes all competitions. The list is sorted by squad number when total clean sheets are equal. Numbers in parentheses represent games where both goalkeepers participated and both kept a clean sheet; the number in parentheses is awarded to the goalkeeper who was substituted on, whilst a full clean sheet is awarded to the goalkeeper who was on the field at the start of play. Goalkeepers with no clean sheets not included in the list.

Rank	No.	Nat.	Goalkeeper	W-League		Total
Rank	No.	Nat.	Goalkeeper	Regular season	Finals series	Total
1	1	(Australia)	Lydia Williams	3	1	4
2	20	(New Zealand)	Aroon Clansey	0 (1)	0	0 (1)
Total				3 (1)	1	4 (1)
