= 2010–11 Canberra United FC (women) season =

Canberra United
2010–11 season
- Chairman: Kate Lundy
- Head Coach: Ray Junna
- Stadium: McKellar Park
- W-League: 3rd
- W-League Finals: Semi-finals
- Top goalscorer: League: Michelle Heyman (7); All: Michelle Heyman (8)
- Highest home attendance: 836 vs. Melbourne Victory (20 November 2010); W-League
- Lowest home attendance: 576 vs. Adelaide United (4 December 2010); W-League
- Average home league attendance: 754
- Biggest win: 4–0 vs. Adelaide United (H) (4 December 2010); W-League
- Biggest defeat: 0–3 vs. Sydney FC (A) (22 January 2011); W-League

The 2010–11 season was Canberra United Football Club's third season, in the W-League. Canberra United finished 3rd in their W-League season, fishing in the semi-finals.

== Players ==
Note: Flags indicate national team as defined under FIFA eligibility rules; some limited exceptions apply. Players may hold more than one non-FIFA nationality.

No.	Pos.	Nation	Player
1	GK	AUS	Lydia Williams
2	DF	AUS	Caitlin Cooper
3	DF	AUS	Lyndsay Glohe
4	FW	AUS	Michelle Heyman
5	MF	AUS	Kahlia Hogg
6	FW	AUS	Caitlin Munoz
7	DF	AUS	Ellie Brush
8	FW	TPE	Tseng Shu-o
9	MF	AUS	Grace Gill
10	MF	AUS	Emily van Egmond

No.	Pos.	Nation	Player
11	MF	AUS	Cian Maciejewski
12	DF	AUS	Sally Rojahn
13	DF	AUS	Nicole Begg
14	FW	AUS	Ashleigh Sykes
15	MF	AUS	Sally Shipard
16	DF	AUS	Ellyse Perry
18	DF	AUS	Grace Field
19	MF	AUS	Jennifer Bisset
22	MF	AUS	Georgia Yeoman-Dale

== Transfers ==
=== Transfers in ===
No.	Position	Name	From	Type/fee	Date	Ref.
2	DF	Caitlin Cooper	Central Coast Mariners	Free transfer	7 October 2010	
3	DF	Lyndsay Glohe	Central Coast Mariners	Free transfer	7 October 2010	
4	FW	Michelle Heyman	Central Coast Mariners	Free transfer	7 October 2010	
15	MF	Sally Shipard	Free agent	Free transfer	7 October 2010	

=== Transfers out ===
No.	Position	Name	From	Type/fee	Date	Ref.
2	DF	Rebecca Kiting	(United States)	Free transfer	7 October 2010	
3	DF	Bronwyn Studman	(United States)	Free transfer	7 October 2010	
4	DF	(Chinese Taipei) Lin Chiung-ying	(Chinese Taipei) ANL Mulan	Free transfer	7 October 2010	
6	FW	Ellie Raymond	Free agent	Free transfer	7 October 2010	
13	DF	Caitlin Cooper	Newcastle Jets	Free transfer	7 October 2010	
17	FW	Christine Walters	Free agent	Free transfer	7 October 2010	

== Competitions ==
=== Overall record ===
Competition	First match	Last match	Starting round	Final position	Record							
Competition	First match	Last match	Starting round	Final position	Pld	W	D	L	GF	GA	GD	Win %
W-League	7 November 2010	29 January 2011	Matchday 1	3rd	10	5	2	3	16	9	+7	50.00
W-League Finals	5 February 2011		Semi-finals	Semi-finals	1	0	1	0	2	2	+0	0.00
Total					11	5	3	3	18	11	+7	45.45

Source: Competitions

=== W-League ===
==== League table ====
Pos	Team	Pld	W	D	L	GF	GA	GD	Pts	Qualification
1	Sydney FC	10	8	0	2	29	9	+20	24	Qualification to Finals series
2	Brisbane Roar (C)	10	6	3	1	17	7	+10	21	Qualification to Finals series
3	Canberra United	10	5	2	3	16	9	+7	17	Qualification to Finals series
4	Melbourne Victory	10	4	3	3	12	11	+1	15	Qualification to Finals series
5	Perth Glory	10	4	1	5	11	15	−4	13	
6	Newcastle Jets	10	3	1	6	13	15	−2	10	
7	Adelaide United	10	0	0	10	4	36	−32	0	

Source: au.soccerway.com
Rules for classification: 1) points; 2) goal difference; 3) number of goals scored.
(C) Champions

==== Results summary ====
Overall								Home						Away					
Pld	W	D	L	GF	GA	GD	Pts	W	D	L	GF	GA	GD	W	D	L	GF	GA	GD
10	5	2	3	16	9	+7	17	3	2	0	11	3	+8	2	0	3	5	6	−1

Source: worldfootball.net

==== Results by round ====
Round	1	2	3	4	5	6	7	8	9	10	11	12
Ground	A	H	H	B	H	A	A	B	A	H	A	H
Result	W	D	D	B	W	W	L	B	L	W	L	W
Position	1	2	2	4	3	3	3	3	3	3	3	3
Points	3	4	5	5	8	11	11	11	11	14	14	17

Source: worldfootball.net
A = Away; H = Home; W = Win; D = Draw; L = Loss

==== Matches ====
The league fixtures were announced on 20 August 2010.

Win Draw Loss

7 November 2010 1	Perth Glory	1–4	Canberra United	Perth
15:00 AWST	Gill 41'	Report	Heyman 34', 70', 87'; Maciejewski 57'	Stadium: 6PR Stadium; Referee: Catherine Hoffman

13 November 2010 2	Canberra United	1–1	Brisbane Roar	Canberra
17:00 AEDT	Butt 45'	Report	Perry 81'	Stadium: McKellar Park; Attendance: 794; Referee: Peta McCallum

20 November 2010 3	Canberra United	1–1	Melbourne Victory	Canberra
17:00 AEDT	Cooper 6'	Report	Ruyter-Hooley 90+5'	Stadium: McKellar Park; Attendance: 836; Referee: Kate Jacewicz

4 December 2010 5	Canberra United	4–0	Adelaide United	Canberra
17:00 AEDT	Munoz 6'; Heyman 9', 16'; Brush 21'	Report		Stadium: Deakin Stadium; Attendance: 576; Referee: Kirralee Gardener
Note: Match abandoned after 68 minutes due to torrential rainfalls.

11 December 2010 6	Newcastle Jets	0–1	Canberra United	Newcastle
15:00 AEDT		Report	Heyman 36'	Stadium: EnergyAustralia Stadium; Attendance: 349; Referee: Peta McCallum

21 December 2010 7	Brisbane Roar	1–0	Canberra United	Brisbane
15:00 AEST	Harch 60'	Report		Stadium: Perry Park; Referee: Fusako Kajiyama
Note: Match originally scheduled for 18 December 2010 at 16:00 AEST, but postponed due to bad weather. It was rescheduled for 21 December 2010 at 15:00 AEST.

8 January 2011 9	Melbourne Victory	1–0	Canberra United	Geelong
15:00 AEDT	Taylor 20'	Report		Stadium: Skilled Stadium; Referee: Stacey Sasopolous

15 January 2011 10	Canberra United	4–1	Newcastle Jets	Canberra
17:00 AEDT	Munoz 3', 78'; Heyman 19'; van Egmond 88'	Report	Andrews 47'	Stadium: Deakin Stadium; Attendance: 769; Referee: Peta McCallum

22 January 2011 11	Sydney FC	3–0	Canberra United	Sydney
17:00 AEDT	Brush 48' (o.g.); Cannuli 76'; Simon 82'	Report		Stadium: Seymour Shaw Park; Attendance: 973; Referee: Kate Jacewicz

29 January 2011 12	Canberra United	1–0	Perth Glory	Canberra
15:00 AEDT	Sykes 88'	Report		Stadium: McKellar Park; Attendance: 797; Referee: Kirralee Andruschak

==== Finals series ====
5 February 2011 Semi-finals	Brisbane Roar	2–2 (a.e.t.) (4–2 p)	Canberra United	Brisbane
14:00 AEST	Butt 23'; Cordner 90+6'	Report	Munoz 57'; Heyman 90+7'	Stadium: Ballymore Stadium; Referee: Jacqui Melksham
	Penalties
	Colthorpe (penalty missed); Carroll (penalty scored); Butt (penalty scored); Kellond-Knight (penalty scored); Dumont (penalty scored)		(penalty scored) Shipard; (penalty missed) Brush; (penalty scored) Cooper; (penalty missed) Perry

== Statistics ==
=== Appearances and goals ===
Includes all competitions. Players with no appearances not included in the list.

No.	Pos.	Nat.	Name	W-League				Total	
No.	Pos.	Nat.	Name	Regular season		Finals series		Total	
No.	Pos.	Nat.	Name	Apps	Goals	Apps	Goals	Apps	Goals
1	GK	(Australia)	Lydia Williams	10	0	1	0	11	0
2	DF	(Australia)	Caitlin Cooper	10	1	1	0	11	1
3	DF	(Australia)	Lyndsay Glohe	4	0	0	0	4	0
4	FW	(Australia)	Michelle Heyman	10	7	1	1	11	8
5	MF	(Australia)	Kahlia Hogg	5+3	0	0	0	8	0
6	FW	(Australia)	Caitlin Munoz	10	3	1	1	11	4
7	DF	(Australia)	Ellie Brush	10	1	1	0	11	1
8	FW	(Chinese Taipei)	Tseng Shu-o	1+7	0	0	0	8	0
9	MF	(Australia)	Grace Gill	4+3	0	0+1	0	8	0
10	MF	(Australia)	Emily van Egmond	9	1	1	0	10	1
11	MF	(Australia)	Cian Maciejewski	8	1	1	0	9	1
12	DF	(Australia)	Sally Rojahn	0+1	0	0	0	1	0
13	DF	(Australia)	Nicole Begg	6	0	1	0	7	0
14	FW	(Australia)	Ashleigh Sykes	1+3	1	1	0	5	1
15	MF	(Australia)	Sally Shipard	10	0	1	0	11	0
16	DF	(Australia)	Ellyse Perry	7	1	1	0	8	1
18	DF	(Australia)	Grace Field	0+3	0	0	0	3	0
19	MF	(Australia)	Jennifer Bisset	2+5	0	0+1	0	8	0
22	MF	(Australia)	Georgia Yeoman-Dale	0+1	0	0+1	0	2	0

=== Disciplinary record ===
Includes all competitions. The list is sorted by squad number when total cards are equal. Players with no cards not included in the list.

Rank	No.	Pos.	Nat.	Name	W-League						Total		
Rank	No.	Pos.	Nat.	Name	Regular season			Finals series			Total		
Rank	No.	Pos.	Nat.	Name	Booked	(yellow card) (yellow-red card)	Sent off (straight red)	Booked	(yellow card) (yellow-red card)	Sent off (straight red)	Booked	(yellow card) (yellow-red card)	Sent off (straight red)
1	6	FW	(Australia)	Caitlin Munoz	2	0	0	0	0	0	2	0	0
1	10	MF	(Australia)	Emily van Egmond	1	0	0	1	0	0	2	0	0
3	5	MF	(Australia)	Kahlia Hogg	1	0	0	0	0	0	1	0	0
3	8	FW	(Chinese Taipei)	Tseng Shu-o	1	0	0	0	0	0	1	0	0
3	11	MF	(Australia)	Cian Maciejewski	1	0	0	0	0	0	1	0	0
3	15	MF	(Australia)	Sally Shipard	1	0	0	0	0	0	1	0	0
Total					7	0	0	1	0	0	8	0	0

=== Clean sheets ===
Includes all competitions. The list is sorted by squad number when total clean sheets are equal. Numbers in parentheses represent games where both goalkeepers participated and both kept a clean sheet; the number in parentheses is awarded to the goalkeeper who was substituted on, whilst a full clean sheet is awarded to the goalkeeper who was on the field at the start of play. Goalkeepers with no clean sheets not included in the list.

Rank	No.	Nat.	Goalkeeper	W-League		Total
Rank	No.	Nat.	Goalkeeper	Regular season	Finals series	Total
1	1	(Australia)	Lydia Williams	3	0	3
