= 2012 W-League grand final =

Championship Australian women's association football game

- Event: 2011–12 W-League
| Canberra United | Brisbane Roar |
| 3 | 2 |
- Date: 28 January 2012
- Venue: McKellar Park, Canberra, ACT, Australia
- Referee: Kate Jacewicz
- Attendance: 2,512

The 2012 W-League grand final was the grand final of the fourth season of the Australian W-League football (soccer) competition. It was contested between premiers Canberra United and second-placed Brisbane Roar at McKellar Park in Canberra on Saturday, 28 January 2012. Canberra United were victorious, winning 3–2.

== Match details ==
28 January 2012

| Canberra United | 3–2 | Brisbane Roar |
|---|---|---|
| Heyman 11', 55'; A. Skyes 18' | Report | Gielnik 23'; Butt 66' (pen.) |

McKellar Park, Canberra
Attendance: 2,512
Referee: Kate Jacewicz

| Canberra United | Brisbane Roar |

CANBERRA UNITED:
| GK | 1 | (Australia) Lydia Williams |
| DF | 2 | (Australia) Caitlin Cooper |
| DF | 7 | (Australia) Ellie Brush (c) | | (substituted off) 76' |
| DF | 13 | (Australia) Nicole Sykes |
| MF | 9 | (Australia) Grace Gill |
| MF | 15 | (Australia) Sally Shipard | (yellow card) 74' |
| MF | 18 | (Australia) Taryn Hemmings |
| MF | 19 | (Australia) Jennifer Bisset |
| FW | 11 | (Australia) Michelle Heyman |
| FW | 8 | (Australia) Hayley Raso | | (substituted off) 69' |
| FW | 14 | (Australia) Ashleigh Sykes |
Substitutes:
| MF | 6 | (Australia) Caitlin Munoz | | (substituted in) 76' |
| FW | 17 | (New Zealand) Emma Kete | | (substituted in) 69' |
| GK | 20 | (New Zealand) Aroon Clansey |
| MF | 10 | (Australia) Snez Veljanovska |
| FW | 3 | (Australia) Georgia Yeoman-Dale |
Manager:
(Czech Republic) Jitka Klimková

BRISBANE ROAR:
| GK | 1 | (Australia) Casey Dumont |
| DF | 2 | (Australia) Laura Alleway | (yellow card) 60' | (substituted off) 84' |
| DF | 5 | (Australia) Brooke Spence |
| DF | 7 | (Australia) Kim Carroll |
| DF | 14 | (Australia) Vedrana Popovic |
| MF | 4 | (Australia) Clare Polkinghorne (c) | | (substituted off) 71' |
| MF | 10 | (Australia) Lana Harch |
| MF | 11 | (Australia) Aivi Luik |
| MF | 13 | (Australia) Tameka Butt |
| FW | 6 | (Australia) Joanne Burgess | | (substituted off) 21' |
| FW | 9 | (Australia) Catherine Cannuli |
Substitutes:
| MF | 18 | (Spain) Olga Cebrian Garcia | | (substituted in) 84' |
| MF | 19 | (Australia) Ellen Beaumont | | (substituted in) 71' |
| FW | 17 | (Australia) Emily Gielnik | (yellow card) 50' | (substituted in) 21' |
| GK | 20 | (Japan) Hoshimi Kishi |
| DF | 21 | (Australia) Rebecca Price |
Manager:
(Wales) Jeff Hopkins

Assistant referees:
Alison Flynn
Sarah Ho
Fourth official:
Casey Reibelt

== See also ==
- W-League records and statistics
