= Canberra United FC Player of the Year =

Award

Canberra United Player of the Year
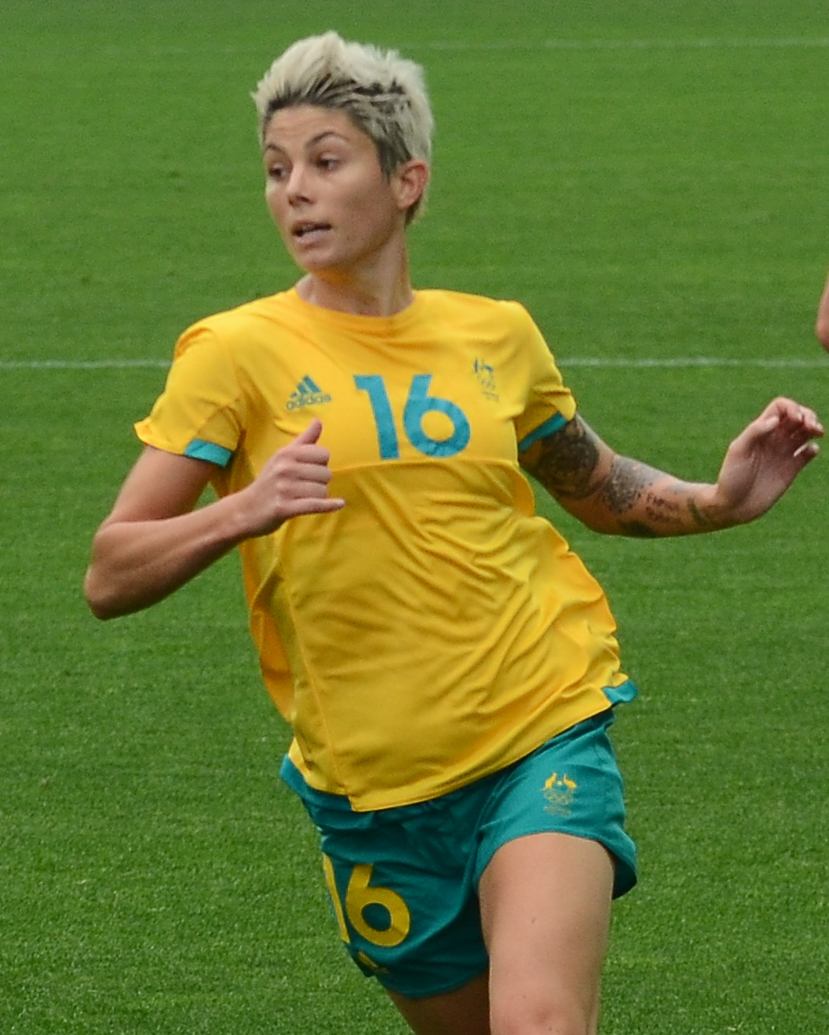
- Michelle Heyman was the most recent winner of back-to-back awards.
- Sport: Association football
- Awarded for: being the best performing Canberra United player over the course of a season
- Presented by: Canberra United FC

History
- First award: 2009; 17 years ago
- Editions: 15
- First winner: (Australia) Ellie Brush
- Most recent: (New Zealand) Elizabeth Anton

The Canberra United Player of the Year award is an official award given by Canberra United Football Club to the best performing player from the club over the course of the season.

The inaugural award was handed to Ellie Brush in 2009. Elizabeth Anton is the most recent winner of the award, following the 2024–25 season.

== Award recipients ==
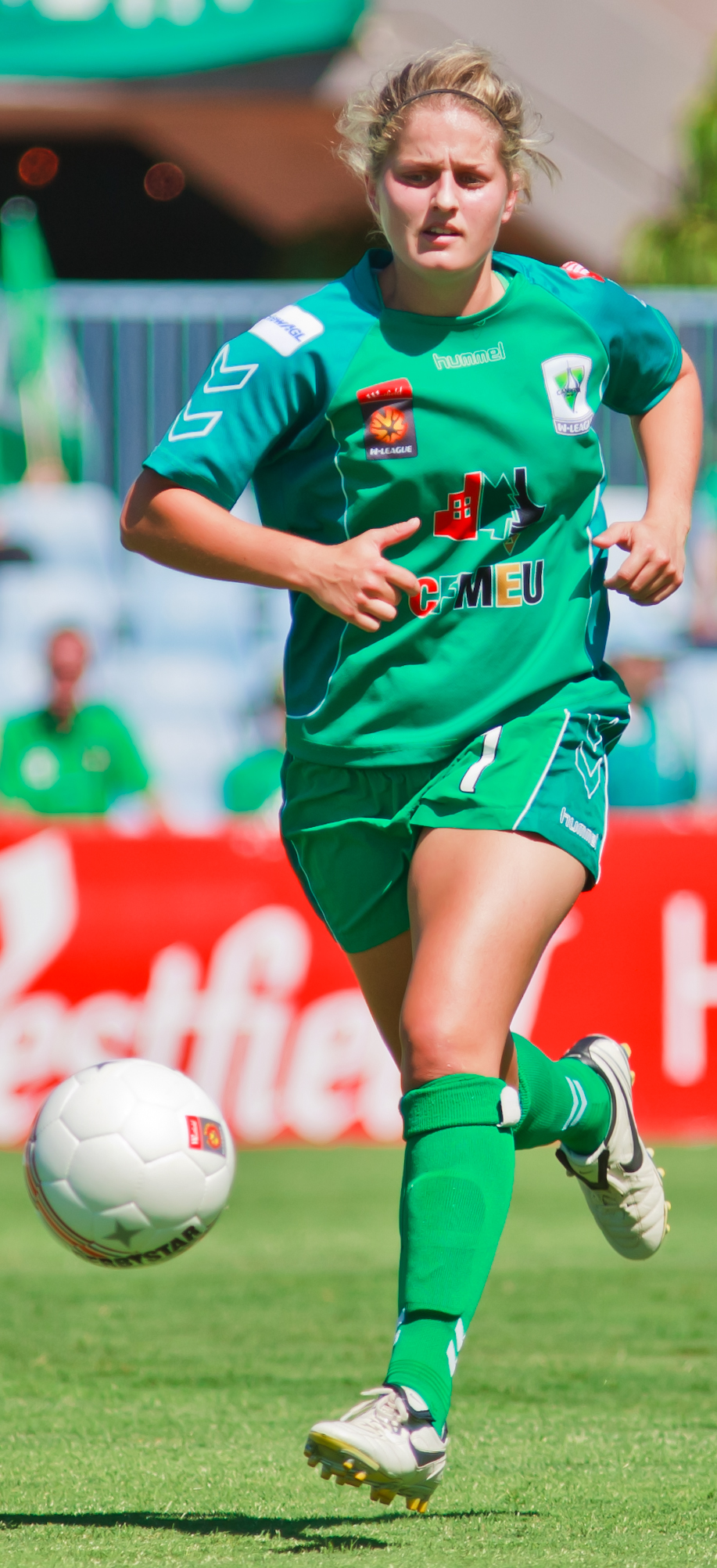
Ellie Brush won the inaugural award in 2009.

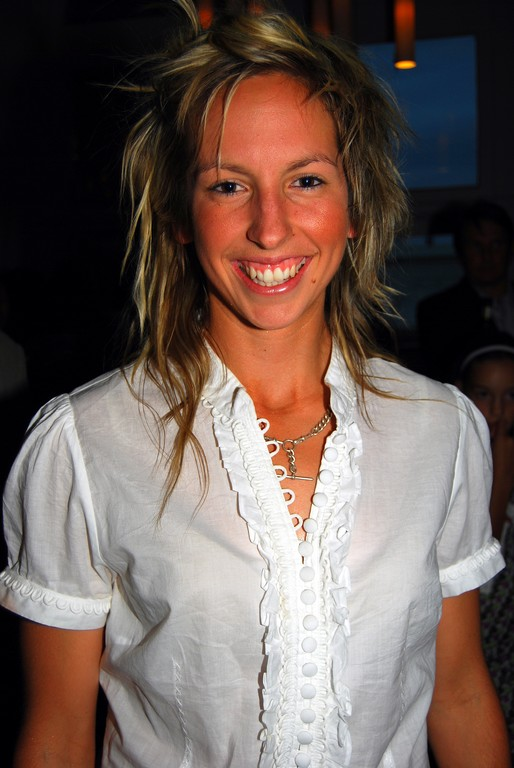
Sally Shipard was the first player to win back-to-back awards.

Players in bold are still playing for Canberra United

Award recipients
Season	Player	Nationality	Position	Ref.
2008–09	Ellie Brush	Australia	Defender	
2009	Ellyse Perry	Australia	Defender	
2010–11	Sally Shipard	Australia	Midfielder	
2011–12	Sally Shipard (2)	Australia	Midfielder	
2012–13	Nicole Sykes	Australia	Defender	
2015–16	Ashleigh Sykes	Australia	Forward	
2016–17	Yukari Kinga	Japan	Defender	
2017–18	Ellie Carpenter	Australia	Defender	
2018–19	Rachel Corsie	Scotland	Defender	
2019–20	Kaleigh Kurtz	United States	Defender	
2020–21	Kendall Fletcher	United States	Defender	
2021–22	Allyson Haran	United States	Defender	
2022–23	**Michelle Heyman**	Australia	Forward	
2023–24	**Michelle Heyman** (2)	Australia	Forward	
2024–25	**Elizabeth Anton**	New Zealand	Defender	
2025–26	**Elizabeth Anton** (2)	New Zealand	Defender	

=== Multiple wins ===
Players with multiple wins
Rank	Winner	Total wins	Years won
1	Sally Shipard (AUS)	2	2011, 2012
1	Michelle Heyman (AUS)	2	2023, 2024
1	Elizabeth Anton (NZL)	2	2025, 2026

=== Wins by nationality ===
Wins by nationality
Nationality	Wins
Australia	8
United States	3
New Zealand	2
Japan	1
Scotland	1

=== Wins by playing position ===
Wins by playing position
Position	Wins
Goalkeeper	0
Defender	11
Midfielder	2
Forward	3
