= 2016–17 Canberra United FC (women) season =

Canberra United W-League
2016–17 season
- Manager: Rae Dower
- Stadium: McKellar Park, Canberra
- W-League: Premiers
- W-League finals series: Semi-finals
- Top goalscorer: League: Ashleigh Sykes (12 goals); All: Ashleigh Sykes (12 goals)
- Highest home attendance: 2,595 vs Melbourne City (12 November 2016)
- Lowest home attendance: 818 vs Brisbane Roar (18 December 2016)
- Average home league attendance: 1,285

The 2016–17 Canberra United W-League season was the club's ninth season in the W-League, the premier competition for women's football in Australia. The team played home games at GIO Stadium, McKellar Park and Central Coast Stadium.

== Players ==
=== Squad information ===
Note: Flags indicate national team as defined under FIFA eligibility rules; some limited exceptions apply. Players may hold more than one non-FIFA nationality.

No.	Pos.	Nation	Player
1	GK	AUS	Trudy Burke
2	DF	JPN	Yukari Kinga
4	DF	AUS	Clare Hunt
5	DF	AUS	Jenna McCormick
7	DF	AUS	Ellie Brush (Captain)
8	FW	AUS	Hayley Raso
9	FW	USA	Jasmyne Spencer
10	MF	AUS	Grace Maher
11	FW	AUS	Michelle Heyman (Co-captain)
12	DF	AUS	Hannah Brewer

No.	Pos.	Nation	Player
13	MF	USA	Celeste Boureille
14	FW	AUS	Ashleigh Sykes
15	DF	AUS	Emma Checker
16	MF	AUS	Karly Roestbakken
17	MF	AUS	Laura Hughes
18	MF	AUS	Kahlia Hogg
19	FW	AUS	Nickoletta Flannery
20	GK	AUS	Georgia Boric
21	GK	AUS	Georgia Stewart
22	DF	USA	Stephanie Ochs
32	FW	AUS	Lisa De Vanna

=== Transfers in ===
No.	Position	Player	Transferred from	Type/fee	Contract length	Date	Ref.
	Defender/Forward	(United States) Stephanie Ochs	(United States) Houston Dash			1 September 2016	
	Goalkeeper	Trudy Burke	Melbourne City			28 September 2016	
	Defender/Midfielder	(Japan) Yukari Kinga	(Japan) INAC Kobe Leonessa			5 October 2016	
		Laura Hughes	(Australia) Woden Valley			13 October 2016	
		Clare Hunt	(Australia) Canberra FC			13 October 2016	
		Karly Roestbakken	(Australia) Monaro Panthers			13 October 2016	
	Midfielder	(United States) Celeste Boureille	(United States) Portland Thorns FC	Loan		19 October 2016	
	Forward	(United States) Jasmyne Spencer	(United States) Orlando Pride	Loan		19 October 2016	
	Forward	Hayley Raso	(United States) Portland Thorns FC	Loan		20 October 2016	
	Defender	Hannah Brewer	Melbourne City			26 October 2016	

=== Transfers out ===
No.	Position	Player	Transferred to	Type/fee	Date	Ref.
	Forward	Caitlin Munoz	Unattached		1 September 2016	
	Defender	Nicole Begg	Unattached		4 November 2016	
	Defender	Catherine Brown	Unattached		4 November 2016	
	Midfielder	Grace Gill	Retired		4 November 2016	
	Forward	Caitlin Munoz	Unattached		4 November 2016	

=== Contract extensions ===
No.	Name	Position	Duration	Date	Notes

== Managerial staff ==
Position	Name
Head coach	Rae Dower
Team manager	
Assistant coach	Njegosh Popovich

== Squad statistics ==
N	Pos.	Nat.	Name	Total					W-League
N	Pos.	Nat.	Name	Apps	Goals	Yellow card	Second yellow card	Red card	Apps	Goals	Yellow card	Second yellow card	Red card
1	GK	(Australia)	Trudy Burke	13	0	1	0	0	13+0	0	1	0	0
2	DF	(Japan)	Yukari Kinga	13	3	2	0	0	13+0	3	2	0	0
4	DF	(Australia)	Clare Hunt	4	0	0	0	0	2+2	0	0	0	0
5	DF	(Australia)	Jenna McCormick	13	1	0	0	0	13+0	1	0	0	0
7	DF	(Australia)	Ellie Brush	7	2	3	0	0	5+2	2	3	0	0
8	FW	(Australia)	Hayley Raso	11	2	3	0	0	10+1	2	3	0	0
9	FW	(United States)	Jasmyne Spencer	10	0	0	0	0	8+2	0	0	0	0
10	MF	(Australia)	Grace Maher	13	3	0	0	0	11+2	3	0	0	0
11	FW	(Australia)	Michelle Heyman	7	2	0	0	0	7+0	2	0	0	0
12	DF	(Australia)	Hannah Brewer	13	0	2	0	0	13+0	0	2	0	0
13	MF	(United States)	Celeste Boureille	13	0	1	0	0	13+0	0	1	0	0
14	FW	(Australia)	Ashleigh Sykes	13	12	0	0	0	13+0	12	0	0	0
15	DF	(Australia)	Emma Checker	7	0	1	0	0	6+1	0	1	0	0
16	MF	(Australia)	Karly Roestbakken	3	1	0	0	0	0+3	1	0	0	0
17	MF	(Australia)	Laura Hughes	1	0	0	0	0	0+1	0	0	0	0
18	MF	(Australia)	Kahlia Hogg	2	0	0	0	0	0+2	0	0	0	0
19	FW	(Australia)	Nickoletta Flannery	13	4	1	0	0	3+10	4	1	0	0
20	GK	(Australia)	Georgia Boric	0	0	0	0	0	0+0	0	0	0	0
21	GK	(Australia)	Georgia Stewart	0	0	0	0	0	0+0	0	0	0	0
22	DF	(United States)	Stephanie Ochs	13	3	1	0	0	13+0	3	1	0	0
32	FW	(Australia)	Lisa De Vanna	6	0	1	0	0	0+6	0	1	0	0

- Last updated: 9 January 2018
- (yellow card) = Number of bookings; (second yellow card) = Number of sending offs after a second yellow card; (red card) = Number of sending offs by a direct red card.

== Competitions ==
=== W-League ===
==== League table ====
Pos	Team	Pld	W	D	L	GF	GA	GD	Pts	Qualification
1	Canberra United	12	7	2	3	33	21	+12	23	Qualification to Finals series
2	Perth Glory	12	7	2	3	22	18	+4	23	Qualification to Finals series
3	Sydney FC	12	7	1	4	22	16	+6	22	Qualification to Finals series
4	Melbourne City (C)	12	6	2	4	19	14	+5	20	Qualification to Finals series
5	Newcastle Jets	12	4	3	5	18	18	0	15	
6	Adelaide United	12	3	5	4	31	26	+5	14	
7	Brisbane Roar	12	4	1	7	15	21	−6	13	
8	Western Sydney Wanderers	12	4	1	7	14	29	−15	13	
9	Melbourne Victory	12	2	3	7	17	28	−11	9	

Source: A-Leagues
Rules for classification: 1) points; 2) goal difference; 3) number of goals scored.
(C) Champions

==== Results summary ====
Overall								Home						Away					
Pld	W	D	L	GF	GA	GD	Pts	W	D	L	GF	GA	GD	W	D	L	GF	GA	GD
12	7	2	3	33	21	+12	23	4	1	1	25	10	+15	3	1	2	8	11	−3

Last updated: 18 November 2017.
Source: Competitive Matches

==== Results by round ====
Round	1	2	3	4	5	6	7	8	9	10	11	12	13	14
Ground	B	H	A	H	A	H	H	B	A	A	H	H	A	H
Result	✖	L	W	W	D	W	W	✖	W	L	D	W	L	W
Position	6	8	6	4	3	3	1	3	2	3	3	2	2	1

Updated to match(es) played on 25 November 2017. Source: Competitive Matches
A = Away; H = Home; B = Bye; W = Win; D = Draw; L = Loss

==== Matches ====
12 November 2016 2	Canberra United	1–2	Melbourne City	Canberra
15:00 AEDT	Brush 90+4'	Report	Alleway 18'; Ayres 80'	Stadium: GIO Stadium; Attendance: 2,595; Referee: Rebecca Durcau

20 November 2016 3	Brisbane Roar	0–1	Canberra United	Brisbane
16:00 AEST		Report	Sykes 54'	Stadium: A.J. Kelly Park; Attendance: 1,613; Referee: Rachel Mitchenson

26 November 2016 4	Canberra United	5–2	Newcastle Jets	Canberra
16:00 AEDT	Heyman 19', 53'; Ochs 33'; Maher 65'; Flannery 90+2'	Report	Dobson 63'; Hoy 88'	Stadium: McKellar Park; Attendance: 871; Referee: Kate Jacewicz

3 December 2016 5	Adelaide United	2–2	Canberra United	Adelaide
19:00 ACDT	Quigley 32'; Brush 54' (o.g.)	Report	Brush 25' (pen.); Raso 82'	Stadium: Elite Systems Football Centre; Attendance: 573; Referee: Lara Lee

10 December 2016 6	Melbourne City	1–2	Canberra United	Melbourne
17:00 AEDT	Yanez 53'	Report	McCormick 49'; Roestbakken 82'	Stadium: CB Smith Reserve; Attendance: 605; Referee: Katie Patterson

18 December 2016 7	Canberra United	5–1	Brisbane Roar	Gosford
14:30 AEDT	Flannery 13', 53'; Ochs 28' (pen.); Sykes 50', 56'	Report	Gielnik 90+2'	Stadium: Central Coast Stadium; Attendance: 818; Referee: Lara Lee

28 December 2016 9	Melbourne Victory	1–2	Canberra United	Melbourne
17:20 AEDT	Dowie 30'	Report	Flannery 52'; Sykes 89' (pen.)	Stadium: AAMI Park; Attendance: 1,963; Referee: Rebecca Durcau

3 January 2017 10	Sydney FC	6–1	Canberra United	Sydney
16:00 AEDT	Bolger 15'; Siemsen 25', 56'; K. Simon 52'; Ordega 66'; L. Khamis 80'	Report	Kinga 65'	Stadium: Lambert Park; Attendance: 1,027

7 January 2017 11	Canberra United	2–2	Adelaide United	Canberra
16:00 AEDT	Sykes 20', 79'	Report	Huerta 65' (pen.), 81'	Stadium: McKellar Park; Attendance: 1,152; Referee: Casey Reibelt

14 January 2017 12	Canberra United	7–2	Perth Glory	Canberra
16:00 AEDT	Sykes 6', 19', 45', 46'; Ochs 25'; Maher 33'; Raso 49'	Report	DiBernardo 57' (pen.); Kerr 79'	Stadium: McKellar Park; Attendance: 1,153; Referee: Kate Jacewicz

22 January 2017 13	Western Sydney Wanderers	1–0	Canberra United	Sydney
14:30 AEDT	Stengel 43'	Report		Stadium: Campbelltown Stadium; Attendance: 3,455; Referee: Rachel Mitchenson

28 January 2017 14	Canberra United	5–1	Melbourne Victory	Canberra
16:00 AEDT	Sykes 40', 90+2'; Kinga 48', 90+4'; Maher 77'	Report	Nairn 49'	Stadium: McKellar Park; Attendance: 1,254; Referee: Lara Lee

5 February 2017 Semi-final	Canberra United	0–1 (a.e.t.)	Melbourne City	Canberra
20:00 AEDT		Report	Fishlock 107'	Stadium: GIO Stadium; Attendance: 5,072; Referee: Rebecca Durcau
