= Samantha Wood =

Samantha Wood may refer to:

- Sammie Wood (born 1991), Australian rugby union, rugby league player, and football (soccer) player
- Samantha Wood (rugby union) (born 2004), Australian rugby union player
