= 2019–20 Canberra United FC (women) season =

12th season in existence of Canberra United

Canberra United
2019–20 season
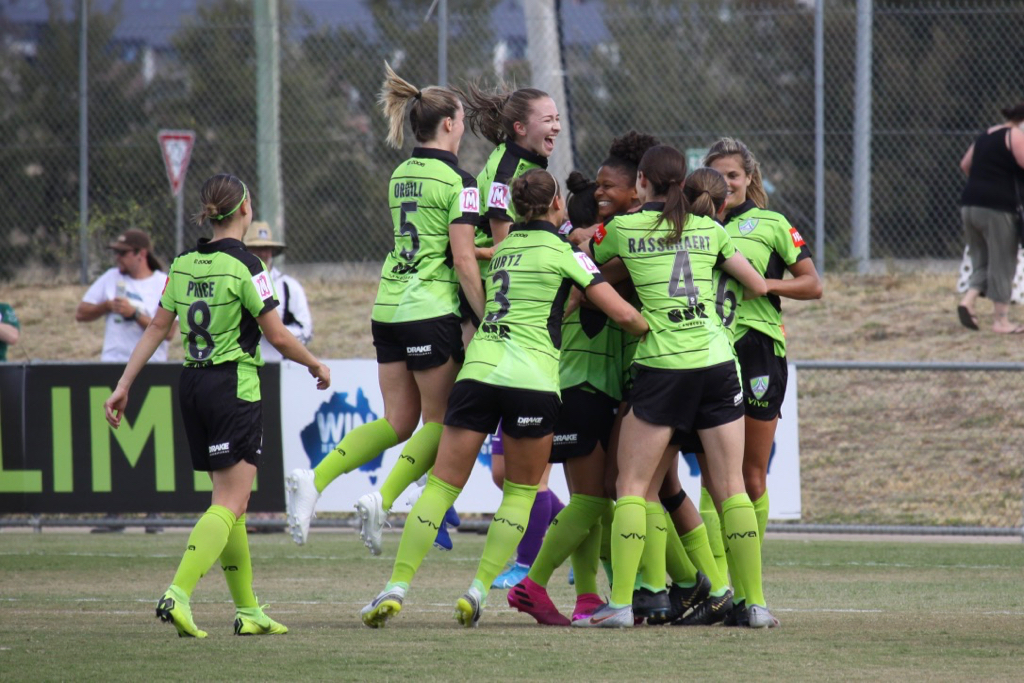
- Chairman: Kate Lundy
- Head Coach: Heather Garriock
- Stadium: McKellar Park
- W-League: 6th
- W-League Finals: DNQ
- Top goalscorer: Simone Charley (5)
- Highest home attendance: 1,482 vs. Perth Glory (17 November 2019); W-League
- Lowest home attendance: 1,185 vs. Brisbane Roar (5 December 2019); W-League
- Average home league attendance: 1,313
- Biggest win: 2–0 vs. Perth Glory (H) (17 November 2019); W-League; 3–1 vs. Adelaide United (H) (16 February 2020); W-League
- Biggest defeat: 0–5 vs. Brisbane Roar (A) (23 February 2020); W-League

The 2019–20 season was Canberra United Football Club's twelfth season in the W-League. Canberra United finished 6th in their W-League season.

== Players ==
Note: Flags indicate national team as defined under FIFA eligibility rules; some limited exceptions apply. Players may hold more than one non-FIFA nationality.

No.	Pos.	Nation	Player
1	GK	AUS	Annalee Grove
2	MF	AUS	Laura Hughes
3	DF	USA	Kaleigh Kurtz (on loan from North Carolina Courage)
4	DF	AUS	Jessie Rasschaert
5	DF	AUS	Nikola Orgill
6	MF	BRA	Camila (on loan from Orlando Pride)
7	FW	USA	Simone Charley (on loan from Portland Thorns)
8	MF	AUS	Olivia Price
9	FW	USA	Katie Stengel
10	DF	AUS	Emma Stanbury

No.	Pos.	Nation	Player
11	DF	NOR	Elise Thorsnes
12	MF	AUS	Hayley Taylor-Young
15	MF	AUS	Ashlie Crofts
17	FW	AUS	Patricia Charalambous
18	DF	AUS	Taren King
19	FW	AUS	Leena Khamis
20	GK	AUS	Sham Khamis
21	MF	AUS	Rebekah Horsey
23	DF	AUS	Lauren Keir
25	DF	AUS	Rachael Goldstein

== Transfers and contracts ==
=== Transfers in ===
No.	Position	Player	Transferred from	Type/fee	Date	Ref.
11	DF	(Norway) Elise Thorsnes	(Norway) LSK Kvinner	Free transfer	30 September 2019	
1	GK	Annalee Grove	Brisbane Roar	Free transfer	15 October 2019	
12	MF	Hayley Taylor-Young	(Australia) Canberra United Academy	Free transfer	25 October 2019	
4	DF	Jessie Rasschaert	(Australia) Belconnen United	Free transfer	28 October 2019	
19	FW	Leena Khamis	Western Sydney Wanderers	Free transfer	31 October 2019	
9	FW	(United States) Katie Stengel	Newcastle Jets	Free transfer	3 November 2019	
7	FW	(United States) Simone Charley	(United States) Portland Thorns	Loan	5 November 2019	
10	DF	Emma Stanbury	(Australia) NWS Koalas	Free transfer	7 November 2019	
15	MF	Ashlie Crofts	(Australia) Blacktown Spartans	Free transfer	7 November 2019	
17	FW	Patricia Charalambous	(Cyprus) Apollon Limassol	Free transfer	7 November 2019	
21	MF	Rebekah Horsesy	(Australia) Lions FC	Free transfer	7 November 2019	
3	DF	(United States) Kaleigh Kurtz	(United States) North Carolina Courage	Loan	12 November 2019	
6	MF	(Brazil) Camila	(United States) Orlando Pride	Loan	13 November 2019	
22	GK	Sally James	(Australia) Belconnen United	Free transfer	14 November 2019	
25	DF	Rachael Goldstein	(Australia) Canberra FC	Free transfer	14 November 2019	
20	GK	Sham Khamis	Melbourne Victory	Loan return	16 March 2020	

=== Transfers out ===
No.	Position	Player	Transferred to	Type/fee	Date	Ref.
17	FW	Maddy Whittall	(Australia) Belconnen United	Free transfer	22 February 2019	
23	FW	(Chile) María José Rojas	(Czech Republic) Slavia Prague	Free transfer	23 February 2019	
9	FW	(South Africa) Rhoda Mulaudzi	(Cyprus) Apollon Limassol	Free transfer	11 July 2019	
6	MF	(South Africa) Refiloe Jane	(Italy) Milan	Free transfer	6 September 2019	
3	DF	Natasha Prior	Retired		2 October 2019	
4	DF	(Scotland) Rachel Corsie	(United States) Utah Royals	Loan return	3 October 2019	
19	FW	Nickoletta Flannery	Newcastle Jets	Free transfer	11 October 2019	
1	GK	Melissa Maizels	Melbourne Victory	Free transfer	24 October 2019	
21	DF	Ellie Carpenter	Melbourne City	Free transfer	29 October 2019	
13	FW	Meaghan McElligott	Unattached	Free transfer	12 October 2019	
15	MF	Rosie Galea	Unattached	Free transfer	12 October 2019	
24	FW	Aoife Colvill	(Scotland) Glasgow City	Free transfer	18 February 2020	
16	DF	Karly Roestbakken	(Norway) LSK Kvinner	Free transfer	13 March 2020	
20	GK	Sham Khamis	Melbourne Victory	Loan	14 March 2020	

=== Contract extensions ===
No.	Position	Player	Duration	Date	Ref.
16	DF	Karly Roestbakken	1 year	24 September 2019	
5	DF	Nikola Orgill	1 year	3 October 2019	
20	GK	Sham Khamis	1 year	15 October 2019	
8	MF	Olivia Price	1 year	18 October 2019	
18	DF	Taren King	1 year	18 October 2019	
2	MF	Laura Hughes	1 year	25 October 2019	
23	DF	Lauren Keir	1 year	14 November 2019	
24	FW	Aofie Colvill	1 year	14 November 2019	
11	DF	(Norway) Elise Thorsnes	2 months	15 January 2020	

== Competitions ==
=== Overall record ===
Competition	First match	Last match	Starting round	Final position	Record							
Competition	First match	Last match	Starting round	Final position	Pld	W	D	L	GF	GA	GD	Win %
W-League	17 November 2019	23 February 2020	Matchday 1	6th	12	4	1	7	13	29	−16	33.33
Total					12	4	1	7	13	29	−16	33.33

Source: Competitions

=== W-League ===
==== League table ====
Pos	Team	Pld	W	D	L	GF	GA	GD	Pts	Qualification
1	Melbourne City (C)	12	11	1	0	27	4	+23	34	Qualification to Finals series
2	Melbourne Victory	12	7	2	3	24	14	+10	23	Qualification to Finals series
3	Sydney FC	12	7	1	4	21	13	+8	22	Qualification to Finals series
4	Western Sydney Wanderers	12	7	1	4	24	20	+4	22	Qualification to Finals series
5	Brisbane Roar	12	5	2	5	22	19	+3	17	
6	Canberra United	12	4	1	7	13	29	−16	13	
7	Perth Glory	12	3	2	7	19	24	−5	11	
8	Adelaide United	12	2	1	9	12	24	−12	7	
9	Newcastle Jets	12	2	1	9	12	27	−15	7	

Source: A-Leagues
Rules for classification: 1) points; 2) goal difference; 3) number of goals scored.
(C) Champions

==== Results summary ====
Overall								Home						Away					
Pld	W	D	L	GF	GA	GD	Pts	W	D	L	GF	GA	GD	W	D	L	GF	GA	GD
12	4	1	7	13	29	−16	13	2	0	4	7	13	−6	2	1	3	6	16	−10

Source: worldfootball.net

==== Results by round ====
Round	1	2	3	4	5	6	7	9	8	10	11	12	13	14
Ground	H	H	A	H	A	A	H	A	H	B	A	H	A	B
Result	W	L	W	L	D	W	L	L	L	X	L	W	L	X
Position	2	4	4	4	4	4	5	6	6	6	6	6	6	6
Points	3	3	6	6	7	10	10	10	10	10	10	13	13	13

Source: worldfootball.net
A = Away; H = Home; B = Bye; W = Win; D = Draw; L = Loss; X = Bye

==== Matches ====
The league fixtures were announced on 18 October 2019.

Win Draw Loss

17 November 2019 1	Canberra United	2–0	Perth Glory	Canberra
16:00 AEDT	Charley 6', 11'	Report		Stadium: McKellar Park; Attendance: 1,482; Referee: Isabella Blaess

24 November 2019 2	Canberra United	1–2	Melbourne City	Canberra
16:00 AEDT	Stengel 59'	Report	Mijatović 67'; van Egmond 90+4'	Stadium: McKellar Park; Attendance: 1,293; Referee: Georgia Ghirardello

30 November 2019 3	Newcastle Jets	2–3	Canberra United	Newcastle
16:50 AEDT	Andrews 41' (pen.), 46' (pen.)	Report	Crofts 29'; Colvill 32'; Thorsnes 81'	Stadium: McDonald Jones Stadium; Attendance: 3,446; Referee: Isabella Libri

5 December 2019 4	Canberra United	1–2	Brisbane Roar	Canberra
19:30 AEDT	Thorsnes 66'	Report	Yallop 17'; Raso 41'	Stadium: McKellar Park; Attendance: 1,185; Referee: Isabella Blaess

13 December 2019 5	Perth Glory	1–1	Canberra United	Perth
19:15 AWST	Carroll 90'	Report	Charley 15'	Stadium: Dorrien Gardens; Attendance: 365; Referee: Georgia Ghirardello

22 December 2019 6	Adelaide United	1–2	Canberra United	Adelaide
16:00 AEDT	Condon 90+3'	Report	L. Khamis 9'; Taylor-Young 78'	Stadium: Marden Sports Complex; Attendance: 693; Referee: Isabella Blaess

26 December 2019 7	Canberra United	0–4	Western Sydney Wanderers	Canberra
19:30 AEDT		Report	Cooney-Cross 38'; O'Sullivan 69'; Hamilton 81'; Williams 85'	Stadium: McKellar Park; Attendance: 1,243; Referee: Rebecca Durcau

9 January 2020 9	Melbourne City	4–0	Canberra United	Melbourne
19:30 AEDT	Simon 5', 49' (pen.); Emslie 33' (pen.); van Egmond 76'	Report		Stadium: ABD Stadium; Attendance: 747; Referee: Kate Jacewicz

13 January 2020 8	Canberra United	0–4	Sydney FC	Canberra
18:00 AEDT		Report	Siemsen 18'; Latsko 33'; Logarzo 49'; Huerta 83'	Stadium: McKellar Park; Attendance: 1,473; Referee: Lara Lee
Note: Match originally scheduled for 5 January at 16:00 AEDT, but postponed due to extreme hazardous air quality in Canberra. It was rescheduled for 13 January at 18:00 AEDT.

26 January 2020 11	Melbourne Victory	3–0	Canberra United	Melbourne
16:00 AEDT	Ayres 31', 38'; Dowie 77'	Report		Stadium: Lakeside Stadium; Attendance: 562; Referee: Lara Lee

16 February 2020 12	Canberra United	3–1	Adelaide United	Canberra
16:00 AEDT	Hughes 34'; Khamis 68'; Charley 80'	Report	I. Hodgson 45'	Stadium: McKellar Park; Attendance: 1,202; Referee: Georgia Ghirardello

23 February 2020 13	Brisbane Roar	5–0	Canberra United	Brisbane
16:30 AEST	Pickett 11', 82'; Baisden 16' (pen.), 90+2'; Connors 84'	Report		Stadium: Lions Stadium; Attendance: 2,893; Referee: Casey Reibelt
Note: Match originally scheduled for 22 February, but rescheduled to accommodate travel and playing commitments of Sydney FC and Perth Glory in the 2020 AFC Champions League. It was rescheduled for 23 February.
