= Sammie Wood =

Australian soccer & rugby player

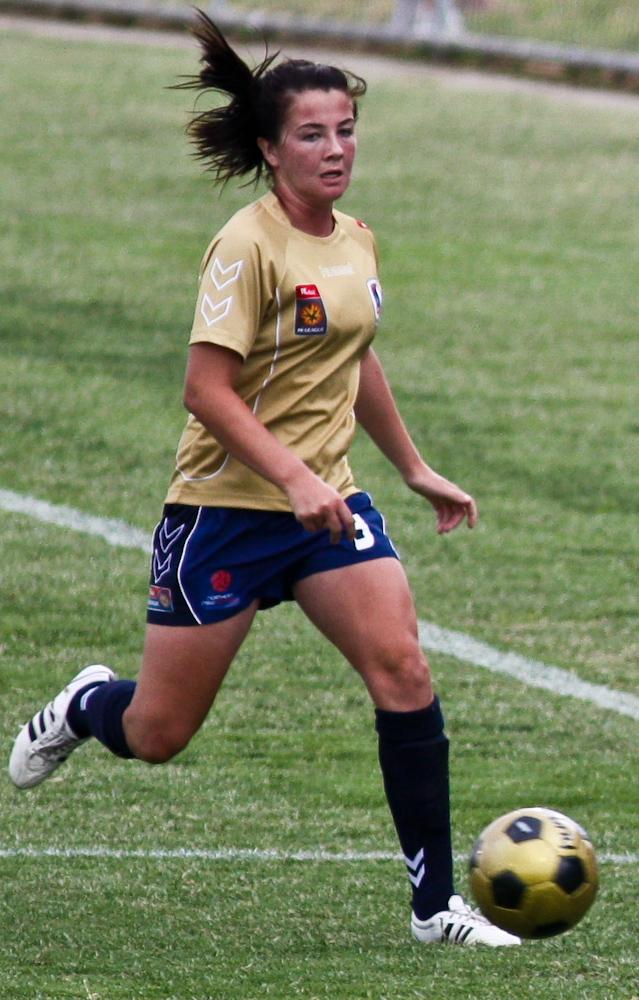
- Full name: Samantha Wood
- Born: 24 May 1991 (age 35) Grenfell, New South Wales, Australia
- Height: 1.65 m (5 ft 5 in)

Rugby union career
- Position: full-back
Senior career
Years	Team	Apps	(Points)
2018	Brumbies Women		
International career
Years	Team	Apps	(Points)
2019	Australia		
Association football career
Team information
- Current team: Canberra FC Women
Senior career*
Years	Team	Apps	(Gls)
2008–2009	Newcastle Jets	8	(0)
2012–2013	Canberra United	7	(1)
- * Club domestic league appearances and goals as of 5 November 2023

Samantha Wood is an Australian rugby union and rugby league player and former football (soccer) player.

Wood started playing rugby league and football from a young age. During her football career, she represented Newcastle Jets and Canberra United in the Australian W-League and Australia at youth level. Her time at Newcastle Jets was cut short by a boating accident, which caused her to require surgery for a fractured skull. Following her career in football, Wood switched to rugby league and played in the inaugural City vs Country Origin match after signing for Queanbeyan Blues in 2017. One year after, she started a career in rugby union too and played in the inaugural Super W season for the Brumbies.

== Early life ==
Wood was born and raised in the small town of Grenfell in New South Wales by her parents Trevor and Linda Wood. Wood first took up sports to escape bullying in school; choosing to play rugby league and, later, association football. Since the age of 10, she has always worn a ribbon in her hair while playing sport; the initial reason for this was so her grandparents could identify her easily on the field.

== Football career ==
Wood started to take up football because her grandfather and mother started to disapprove of her playing rugby league. Wood represented the Australia national football team, The Matildas, at under-17 and under-20 levels. With the former, she was part of a team that achieved a silver medal in the Youth Olympic Games. She played for Newcastle Jets for the 2008–2009 season and made eight league appearances, including four as a substitute. Her season ended prematurely due to a boating accident, which resulted in a fractured skull. Her next football club was Western NSW Panthers.

In 2012, she moved to Canberra to study sports coaching and exercise science; she briefly played for Canberra FC, scoring 11 goals in 17 appearances before impressing in trials for Canberra United and signing for them.

== Rugby league career ==
While playing for Queanbeyan Blues, Wood was selected for the inaugural women's City vs Country Origin on 14 May 2017; she represented the Country team.

After a break from rugby league, she returned in 2020 to play for Queanbeyan Blues again.

== Rugby union career ==
Wood switched to rugby union in 2018, signing for Super W team Brumbies and also representing University of Canberra in rugby sevens. She scored her first points in the inaugural Super W season, the 2018 season, in a fixture against Melbourne Rebels. She scored a conversion and a penalty in a 37–8 victory for the Brumbies.

Wood usually operates as a full-back in rugby union. She earned her first call-up to the Australia women's national rugby union team, The Wallaroos, on 14 April 2019. In November of that year, she was called up to the Australia A team to compete in the Oceania Championship.

== Personal life ==
In January 2009, Wood had a serious accident while being towed on a tube behind a boat on Wyangala Dam. A wave caused her knee to collide with her nose at high speed; she spent six days in hospital as a result and had to have her nose and sinuses reconstructed. The accident fractured her skull and caused her to miss the rest of the season with Newcastle Jets. Outside of her sporting career, Wood is a primary school teacher who works in Canberra.

== Honours ==
with Canberra United

- Premier League Player of the Year
