= Grace Field =

Australian football player (born 1994)

Personal information
- Full name: Grace Field
- Date of birth: 28 March 1994 (age 32)
- Place of birth: Canberra, Australia
- Height: 1.65 m (5 ft 5 in)
- Position: Defender

Senior career*
Years	Team	Apps	(Gls)
2010–2011	Canberra United	3	(0)
2012–2015	Canberra United	7	(1)
- * Club domestic league appearances and goals as of 14 September 2014

Grace Field (born 28 March 1994) is an Australian football (soccer) player, who currently captains and plays for Canberra United in the Australian W-League.

In 2020, following a brief departure from soccer, Field returned to play for Canberra Croatia.
