= Trudy Burke =

Australian association football player

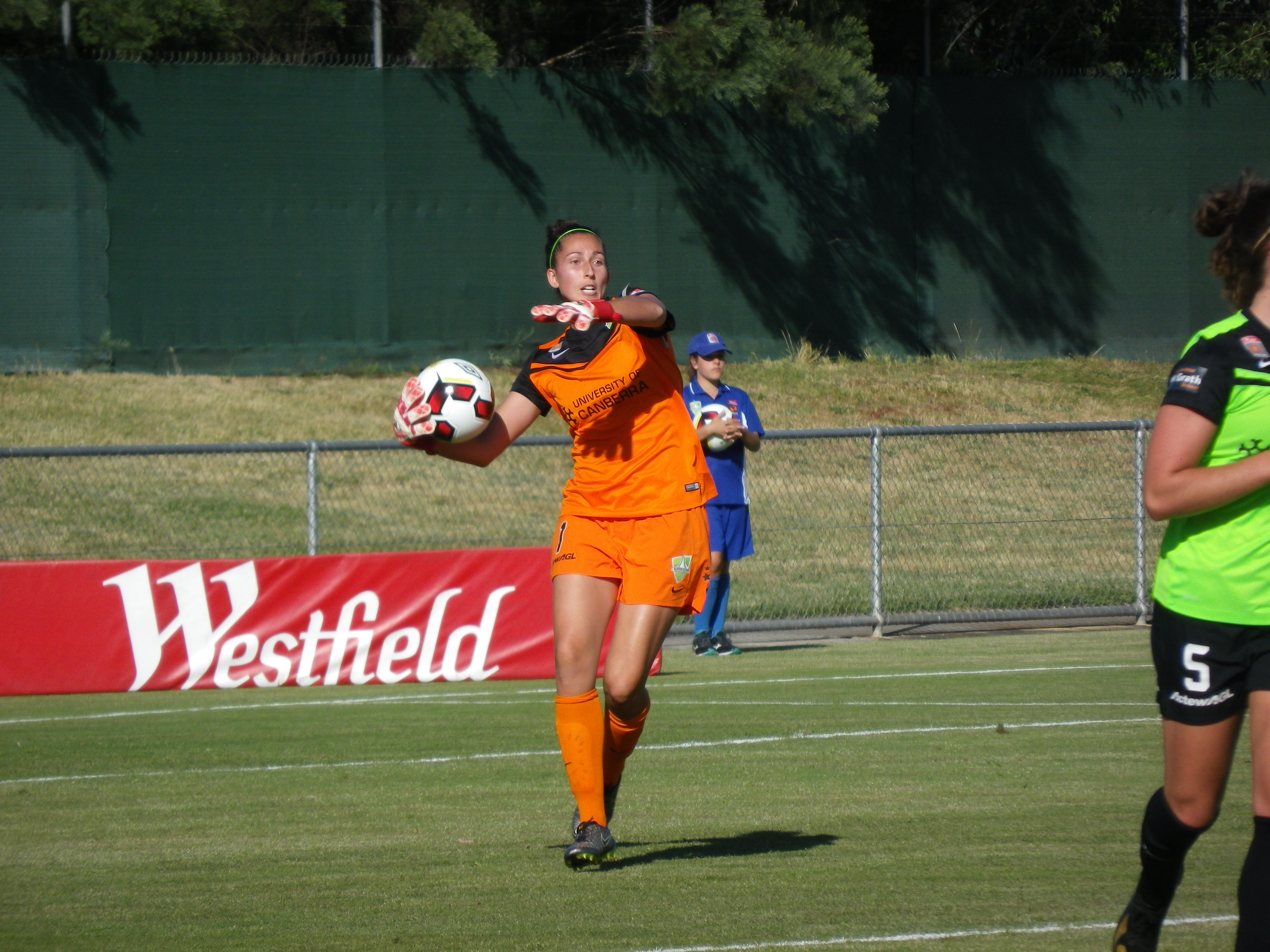
- Burke playing for Canberra United in 2016

Personal information
- Full name: Trudy Burke
- Date of birth: 15 April 1991 (age 35)
- Place of birth: Shellharbour, Australia
- Height: 1.84 m (6 ft 0 in)
- Position: Goalkeeper

Team information
- Current team: North Shore Mariners
- Number: 1

Senior career*
| Years | Team | Apps | (Gls) |
| 2012–2013 | Macarthur Rams | 12 | (0) |
| 2012–2014 | Canberra United | 3 | (0) |
| 2014–2015 | Western Sydney Wanderers | 9 | (0) |
| 2015–2016 | Melbourne City | 7 | (0) |
| 2016–2017 | Canberra United | 13 | (0) |
| 2017–2018 | Western Sydney Wanderers | 1 | (0) |
| 2018–2020 | Sydney FC | 1 | (0) |
| 2020– | North Shore Mariners | 22 | (0) |
- * Club domestic league appearances and goals as of 20 February 2018

Trudy Burke (born 15 April 1991) is an Australian association football player, who currently plays for North Shore Mariners.

== Club career ==
Burke started out her sporting career as a promising cricketer, playing in first-grade competition in Sydney and with the NSW under-19 team as a bowler. After training with Sydney FC and being called up as the reserve goalkeeper in a semi-final against Brisbane Roar, Burke decided to focus her energies on football.

=== Canberra United ===
In October 2012, Burke signed for Canberra United, along with Mackenzie Arnold, as back-up keepers for Lydia Williams, who was recovering at the time from knee reconstruction surgery.

Burke made her debut on 11 November 2012, starting instead of an injured Mackenzie Arnold against Western Sydney Wanderers in a match that ended in a 1–1 draw.

=== Western Sydney Wanderers ===
Before the 2014 season Burke joined Western Sydney Wanderers, which made Canberra United sign Chantel Jones from Perth Glory after Lydia Williams had an ACL injury, which in turn had Perth Glory sign Mackenzie Arnold from Western Sydney Wanderers.

=== Melbourne City ===
In September 2015, Burke joined Melbourne City for their inaugural season.

=== Return to Canberra United ===
Following the departure of Lydia Williams from Canberra United, they signed Burke on 28 September 2016.

=== Return to Western Sydney Wanderers ===
Burke returned to Western Sydney Wanderers ahead of the 2017–18 season.

=== Sydney FC ===
In November 2018, it was announced Burke had been signed with Sydney FC.

=== North Shore Mariners ===
In March 2020, Burke joined NPL club North Shore Mariners, ahead of the 2020 season.
