= Aroon Clansey =

New Zealand footballer

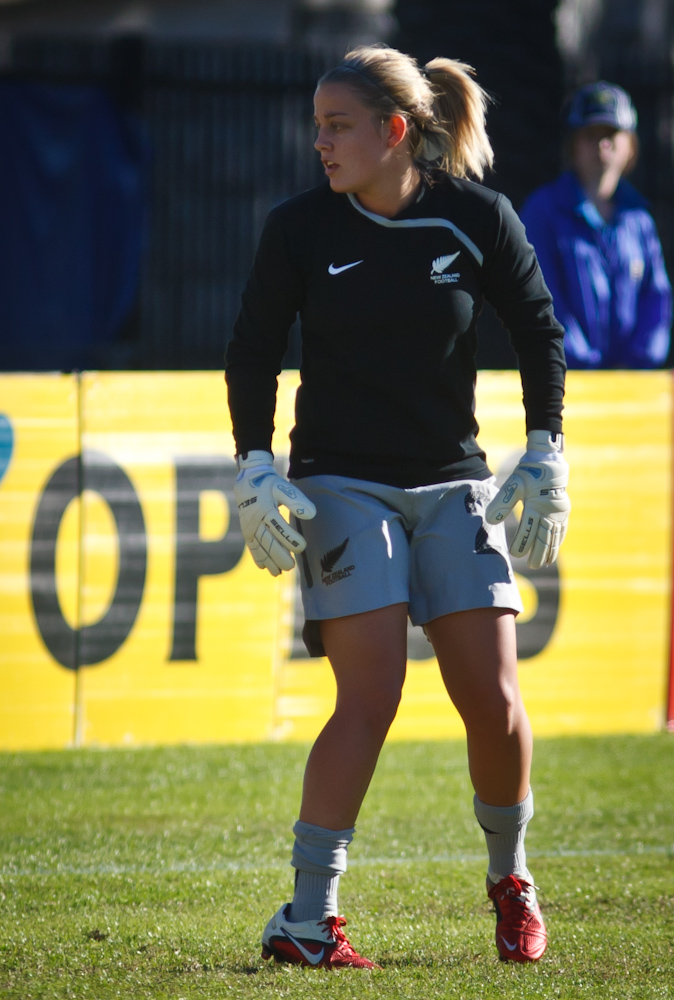

Personal information
- Full name: Aroon Belinda Clansey
- Date of birth: 12 February 1987 (age 39)
- Place of birth: Auckland, New Zealand
- Height: 1.65 m (5 ft 5 in)
- Position: Goalkeeper

Senior career*
Years	Team	Apps	(Gls)
- Three Kings United
2011–2012	Canberra United FC		
2012	Liverpool LFC	1	(0)
2012-2013	Canberra United	1	(0)

International career^{‡}
2006–2011	New Zealand	5	(0)
- * Club domestic league appearances and goals ‡ National team caps and goals as of 9 March 2011

Aroon Belinda Clansey (born 12 February 1986) is a former association football player who has represented New Zealand as a goalkeeper at international level. She signed for English FA WSL club Liverpool Ladies in February 2012.

Clansey represented New Zealand U-20 at the 2006 FIFA U-20 Women's World Championship in Russia, playing all three group games.

She made her début for the senior national side, the Football Ferns in a 0–2 loss to China on 16 November 2006. Despite having not made the field in a competitive match since, Clansey continues to be selected as second choice goalkeeper, being named in the squad to contest the Cyprus Women's Cup in 2010, and the Oceania Women's Nations Cup where she made her second appearance.

In 2011, Clansey was signed by Canberra United. She joined the team after leaving her New Zealand club side, Three Kings United. Clansey helped Canberra finish unbeaten and win the 2011–2012 W-League championship, then transferred to the women's section of Liverpool FC—the club she supports. In April 2012 Clansey was appointed as one of eight WSL digital media ambassadors, one from each team, who wear their Twitter account name on their shirt sleeves to raise the profile of the league.

Due to injuries, Clansey only made two competitive appearances for Liverpool. She was released by the club at the end of the season, returning to Canberra United to work as a video analyst.
