= Christine Walters =

Australian soccer player

Personal information
- Date of birth: 17 June 1991 (age 35)
- Place of birth: Canberra, Australia
- Height: 1.71 m (5 ft 7 in)
- Position: Defender

Senior career*
Years	Team	Apps	(Gls)
2008–2010	Canberra United	6	(0)
2011–2013	Canberra United	7	(0)

International career^{‡}
2008	Australia	4	(0)
- * Club domestic league appearances and goals as of 10 June 2010 ‡ National team caps and goals as of 12 July 2010

Christine Walters (born 17 June 1991) is an Australian football player, who played for Canberra United FC in the Australian W-League.

== Honours ==
=== International ===
Australia

- AFF Women's Championship: 2008
