= Ashleigh Sykes =

Australian international soccer player

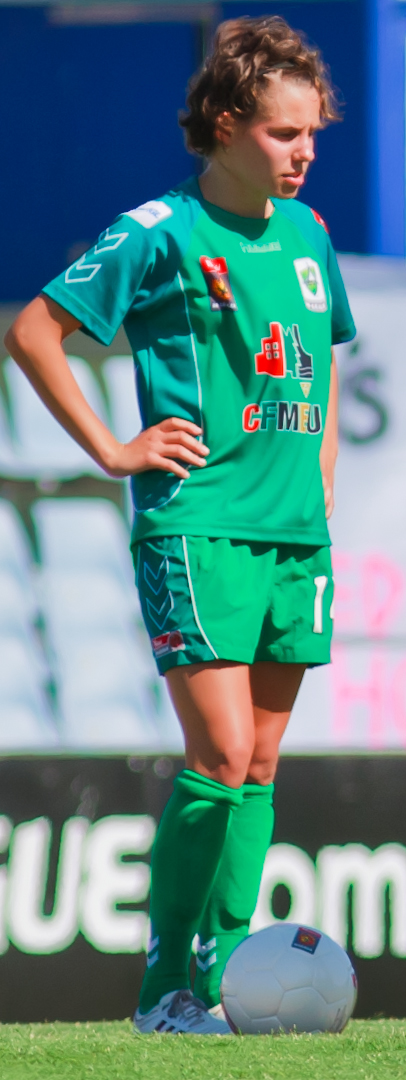
- Sykes playing for Canberra United in 2009

Personal information
- Full name: Ashleigh Sykes
- Date of birth: 15 December 1991 (age 34)
- Place of birth: Dubbo, New South Wales, Australia
- Height: 1.64 m (5 ft 5 in)
- Position: Striker

Youth career
- SASS Strikers

Senior career*
Years	Team	Apps	(Gls)
2008–2018	Canberra United	97	(37)
2016	AS Harima ALBION		
2017	Portland Thorns	17	(1)
2021–2022	Canberra United	8	(3)

International career^{‡}
2008–2009	Australia U-20	12	(5)
2008–2018	Australia	19	(5)
- * Club domestic league appearances and goals as of 21 October 2017 ‡ National team caps and goals as of 7 March 2016

Ashleigh Sykes (born 15 December 1991) is an Australian international football player who last played in 2022 for Canberra United FC of the A-League Women and has previously played for Portland Thorns FC in the U.S.'s National Women's Soccer League and AS Harima Albion in Japan's Nadeshiko League.

== Early life ==
Sykes grew up in Dubbo, New South Wales. She played for Dubbo SASS, and was also CSSA Athletics champion in 2006. She has a twin, Nicole, who is also a footballer.

== Playing career ==
=== Club ===
Sykes joined Canberra United along with her sister Nicole in the W-League whilst still finishing school for the league's inaugural season in 2008–09. She made her debut in Canberra's first match, coming on for Grace Gill in a loss to Newcastle Jets. On 30 November 2008, Sykes scored her first goal for the club – the equaliser in a two-all draw with Perth Glory. Canberra went on to make the Grand Final only to lose to Brisbane Roar, with Sykes playing the second half. Sykes was presented with the club's Rising Star award after a strong first season.

A broken leg suffered in a challenge against Melbourne Victory saw Sykes miss much of the 2010–11 W-League. However, Ashleigh was able to recover in time for the end of the season and finals in January 2011. Her late winner against Perth Glory saw Canberra qualify for the finals. Despite this, Canberra were eliminated by Brisbane Roar in the semi-final after a penalty shootout.

Sykes was a member of the Canberra side which won the W-League Premiership after going through the entire 2011–12 W-League undefeated. On 28 January 2012, Sykes scored Canberra's second goal and set up another to secure a win in the 2012 W-League Grand Final, winning the club its first W-League Championship.

Sykes was once again a key player in the Canberra side which won a second Premiership in the 2013–14 W-League.

On 7 December 2014, Sykes scored from a volley into the top corner from outside the area against Perth Glory to ensure Canberra's qualification for the finals of the 2014 W-League. The goal was later awarded W-League Goal of the Season. Sykes went on to score twice in the Grand Final against Perth to earn Canberra its second Championship, and was also given the Player of the Grand Final award.

On 10 February 2016, Sykes joined Japanese 2nd division club AS Harima ALBION.

Sykes signed with the Portland Thorns in 2017 and made her first appearance for the team on 17 June 2017. After finishing second during the regular season, the Thorns advanced to the NWSL Championship with 4–1 win over the Orlando Pride. Sykes became an NWSL champion when the Thorns defeated the regular-season winning team North Carolina Courage 1–0 in the 2017 NWSL Championship on 14 October 2017.

On 16 February 2018, Sykes retired from football at the age of 26 after 10 years at the top level, saying "I'm looking forward to moving on to the next stage of life."

In November 2021, after playing with Canberra Olympic, Sykes returned to the A-League Women, re-joining Canberra United for the 2021-22 season.

=== International ===
Sykes represented Australia U-20 on numerous occasions, including at the 2009 AFC U-19 Women's Championship.

Sykes was first called up to the Australia senior side for the 2008 AFF Women's Championship in Vietnam and made her debut in the opening match against Thailand, setting up a goal after replacing Tameka Butt early in the match. She scored her first international goal in the next match, a win over Philippines. Sykes scored again in the next match – a 6–0 win over Singapore. Sykes played a full match in the final as Australia won the tournament.

Sykes was not called up to the national side again until 2013, when she was selected for two friendlies against China, along with sister Nicole.

Following the appointment of Alen Stajcic, Sykes was more regularly involved with the national side. She was called up for the 2014 AFC Women's Asian Cup, and played in the group stage match against Jordan. Australia finished second in the tournament after losing to Japan in the final. She was also called up for the 2015 Cyprus Cup, and scored in victories over Finland and Czech Republic.

In May 2015, Sykes was called up for the 2015 FIFA Women's World Cup in Canada. She made her World Cup debut in the first match of the group stage, playing the final seven minutes in a loss to USA.

== Career statistics ==
=== International appearances ===
Australia national team
Year	Apps	Goals
2008	4	2
2009	0	0
2010	0	0
2011	0	0
2012	0	0
2013	1	0
2014	1	0
2015	10	2
2016	3	1
Total	19	5

=== International goals ===
#	Date	Venue	Opponent	Score	Result	Competition
1	11 October 2008	Thanh Long Sports Centre, Ho Chi Minh City, Vietnam	Philippines	4–0	7–0	2008 AFF Women's Championship
2	13 October 2008	Thanh Long Sports Centre, Ho Chi Minh City, Vietnam	Singapore	3–0	6–0	2008 AFF Women's Championship
3	9 March 2015	GSZ Stadium, Larnaca, Cyprus	Finland	2–0	3–0	2015 Cyprus Cup
4	11 March 2015	Paralimni Stadium, Paralimni, Cyprus	Czech Republic	6–2	6–2	2015 Cyprus Cup
5	2 March 2016	Nagai Stadium, Osaka, Japan	Vietnam	6–0	9–0	2016 Olympics qualifying

== Honours ==
=== Club ===
Canberra United

- W-League Championship: 2011–12, 2014
- W-League Premiership: 2011–12, 2013–14

Portland Thorns

- NWSL Championship: 2017

=== International ===
Australia

- AFF Women's Championship: 2008
- AFC Olympic Qualifying Tournament: 2016

=== Individual ===
- Dubbo Sportsperson of the Year: 2010
- W-League Player of the Grand Final: 2015
- W-League Goal of the Year: 2014
- Julie Dolan Medal: 2015–16
