= Georgia Yeoman-Dale =

Australian soccer player

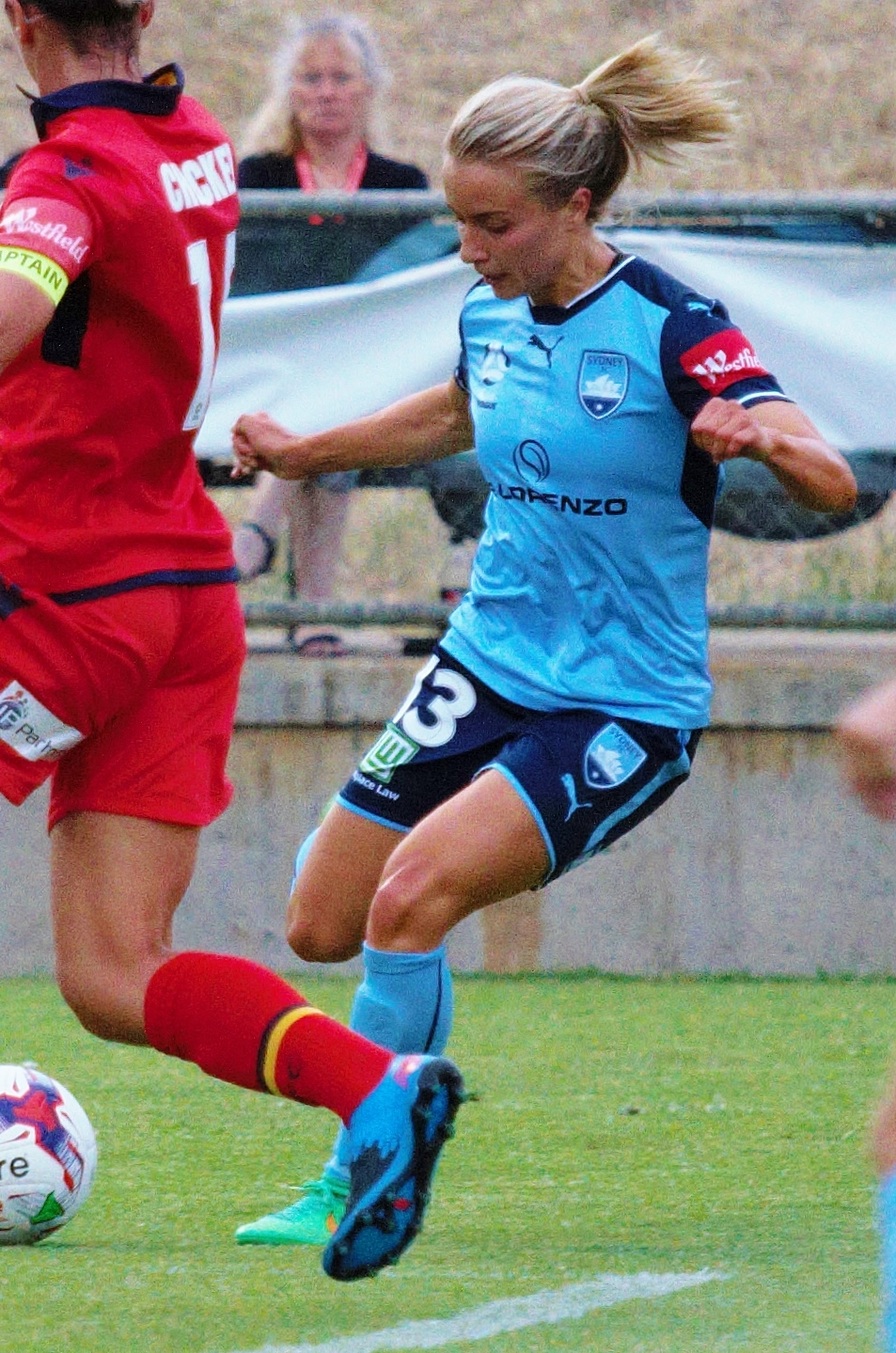

Personal information
- Full name: Georgia Yeoman-Dale
- Date of birth: 24 February 1994 (age 32)
- Place of birth: Canberra, Australia
- Positions: Right-back; attacking midfielder

Senior career*
Years	Team	Apps	(Gls)
2011–2014	Canberra United	28	(4)
2014–2016	Newcastle Jets	21	(1)
2016–2018	Sydney FC	27	(0)
2018–2019	Western Sydney Wanderers	7	(2)
2020–2021	Western Sydney Wanderers	8	(1)

International career^{‡}
2012–	Australia	5	(0)
- * Club domestic league appearances and goals as of 14 November 2019 ‡ National team caps and goals as of 16 September 2017

Georgia Yeoman-Dale (born 24 February 1994) is an Australian former professional association football player, who last played for Western Sydney Wanderers in the Australian W-League. She currently serves as football commentator with 10 Sport.

== Club career ==
=== Canberra United ===
Yeoman-Dale started her professional career at Canberra United.

=== Newcastle Jets ===
Ahead of the 2014 season, Yeoman-Dale signed with Newcastle Jets.

=== Sydney FC ===
On 13 September 2016, Sydney FC announced their squad for the 2016–17 season, including Yeoman-Dale.

=== Western Sydney Wanderers ===
On 23 August 2018 Yeoman-Dale signed with the Western Sydney Wanderers for the 2018-19 W-League Season. She was one of several players who made the switch from Sydney FC to rivals Western Sydney. Yeoman-Dale departed Western Sydney Wanderers ahead of the 2021–22 A-League Women season.

== International career ==
Yeoman-Dale made her debut for Australia in 2012. She most recently received a call-up to the Matildas squad in August 2017, for a pair of friendlies against Brazil.
