= Caitlin Cooper =

Australian footballer

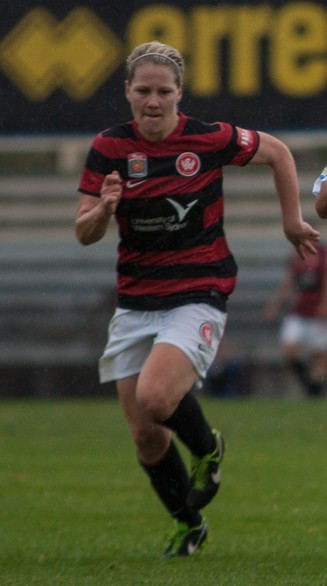
- Cooper debuts for the Western Sydney Wanderers in 2013

Personal information
- Full name: Caitlin Cooper
- Date of birth: 12 February 1988 (age 38)
- Place of birth: Port Macquarie, New South Wales, Australia
- Height: 1.72 m (5 ft 8 in)
- Position: Defender

Team information
- Current team: Western Sydney Wanderers
- Number: 2

Youth career
- 2001–2004: Northern NSW Pride
- 2004–2008: NSW Sapphires

Senior career*
Years	Team	Apps	(Gls)
2008–2010	Central Coast Mariners	20	(0)
2010–2013	Canberra United	33	(3)
2013–2017	Western Sydney Wanderers	40	(1)
2017–2018	Sydney FC	14	(1)
2018–	Western Sydney Wanderers	34	(1)

International career^{‡}
2004–2007	Australia U20	15	(3)
2008–	Australia	10	(2)
- * Club domestic league appearances and goals as of 23 January 2020 (UTC) ‡ National team caps and goals as of 26 March 2018

Caitlin Cooper (born 12 February 1988) is an Australian soccer player, who plays for the Western Sydney Wanderers in the Australian W-League. She has previously played for Central Coast Mariners, Canberra United and Sydney FC.

== Club career ==
=== Central Coast Mariners, 2008–2010 ===
Cooper was the inaugural captain for the Mariners and she made her debut against Melbourne Victory on Saturday, 25 October 2008.

=== Canberra United, 2010–2013 ===
In three season at Canberra United, Cooper appeared in 34 games and scored 3 goals. In the 2011–12 season Canberra won the Premiership and the W-League Championship.

=== Western Sydney Wanderers, 2013–2017 ===
Cooper joined the Western Sydney Wanderers ahead of the 2013–14 season. She made 40 appearances for the club over 4 seasons.

=== Sydney FC, 2017–2018 ===
Cooper joined Sydney FC ahead of the 2017–18 season. Sydney FC made it all the way to the 2018 Grand Final, where they lost to Melbourne City 2–0.

=== Western Sydney Wanderers, 2018–present ===
Cooper would return to the Western Sydney Wanderers for the 2018–19 season.

Cooper was crowned the W-League team's Wanderers Medal for Player of the Year in 2021 and was also named the club's W-League Members' Player of the Year in 2021 after impressive performances in every single match this season.

Cooper held the all time games record for the Wanderers with 83 appearances until she was overtaken by Danika Matos who played her 84th game for the Wanderers against Newcastle Jets on 14 February 2025.

== International career ==
Cooper made her debut for the Matildas in 2007 in a 2008 Olympic Qualifying game against Hong Kong. Her next call-up did not occur until June 2012.

Cooper was part of the Matildas squad that won the 2017 Tournament of Nations and defeated the United States for the first time ever.

In April 2018, Cooper was named to the Australian team for the 2018 AFC Women's Asian Cup, but she did not appear in any games. Australia finished Runner-up to Japan and qualified for the 2019 FIFA Women's World Cup.

In May 2021, Cooper was recalled to the Matildas camp and was then selected in the 25 person squad for the Matildas friendlies with Denmark and Sweden ahead of the 2022 Tokyo Olympic Games.

== Honours ==
=== Club ===
Canberra United

- W-League Championship: 2011–12
- W-League Premiership: 2011–12

=== International ===
- AFC Olympic Qualifying Tournament: 2016
- Tournament of Nations: 2017

== Career statistics ==
=== International goals ===
Key (expand for notes on "international goals" and sorting)
Location	Geographic location of the venue where the competition occurred Sorted by country name first, then by city name
Lineup	Start – played entire match on minute (off player) – substituted on at the minute indicated, and player was substituted off at the same time off minute (on player) – substituted off at the minute indicated, and player was substituted on at the same time (c) – captain Sorted by minutes played
#	NumberOfGoals.goalNumber scored by the player in the match (alternate notation to Goal in match)
Min	The minute in the match the goal was scored. For list that include caps, blank indicates played in the match but did not score a goal.
Assist/pass	The ball was passed by the player, which assisted in scoring the goal. This column depends on the availability and source of this information.
penalty or pk	Goal scored on penalty-kick which was awarded due to foul by opponent. (Goals scored in penalty-shoot-out, at the end of a tied match after extra-time, are not included.)
Score	The match score after the goal was scored. Sorted by goal difference, then by goal scored by the player's team
Result	The final score. Sorted by goal difference in the match, then by goal difference in penalty-shoot-out if it is taken, followed by goal scored by the player's team in the match, then by goal scored in the penalty-shoot-out. For matches with identical final scores, match ending in extra-time without penalty-shoot-out is a tougher match, therefore precede matches that ended in regulation
aet	The score at the end of extra-time; the match was tied at the end of 90' regulation
pso	Penalty-shoot-out score shown in parentheses; the match was tied at the end of extra-time
	Green background color – exhibition or closed door international friendly match
	Yellow background color – match at an invitational tournament
	Red background color – Olympic women's football qualification match
	Light-blue background color – FIFA women's world cup qualification match
	Pink background color – Olympic women's football tournament
	Blue background color – FIFA women's world cup final tournament
NOTE: some keys may not apply for a particular football player

Goal	Date	Location	Opponent	Score	Result	Competition
1	4 August 2007	Mong Kok Stadium, Kowloon, Hong Kong	Hong Kong	3–0	8–1	2008 Olympics qualifying
2	7 March 2018	Albufeira Municipal Stadium, Albufeira, Portugal	Portugal	1–1	1–2	2018 Algarve Cup

Sporting positions
Preceded by None	Central Coast Mariners captain 2008–2010	Succeeded by None
Preceded by Heather Garriock	Western Sydney Wanderers captain 2014–2017	Incumbent
