= Jennifer Bisset =

Australian football player

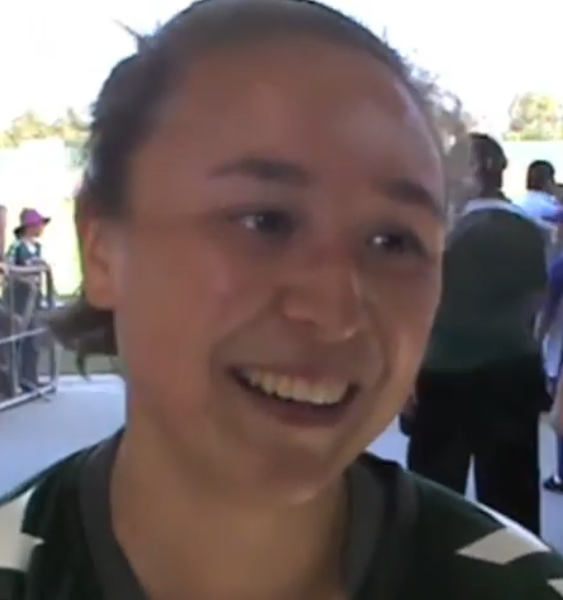
- In a 2011 interview

Personal information
- Date of birth: 28 January 1992 (age 34)
- Place of birth: Newcastle, New South Wales, Australia
- Position: Midfielder

Youth career
- Weston Molonglo Football Club
- ACTAS

Senior career*
Years	Team	Apps	(Gls)
- ANU FC
2008–2015	Canberra United	56	(2)
2013	PK-35 Vantaa	21	(4)
2017–2018	Western Sydney Wanderers	4	(0)
2015–2017	Dunbar Rovers	41	(35)
- * Club domestic league appearances and goals as of 20 February 2018

Jennifer Bisset (born 28 January 1992 in Newcastle, New South Wales) is an Australian football (soccer) player who plays for Western Sydney Wanderers in the Australian W-League. During the 2013 off-season she played for Pallokerho-35 in Finland's Naistenliiga.

In October 2017, Bisset joined Western Sydney Wanderers for the 2017–18 W-League season.

She is also a journalist and film critic for CNET.
