= Sally Shipard =

Australian soccer player

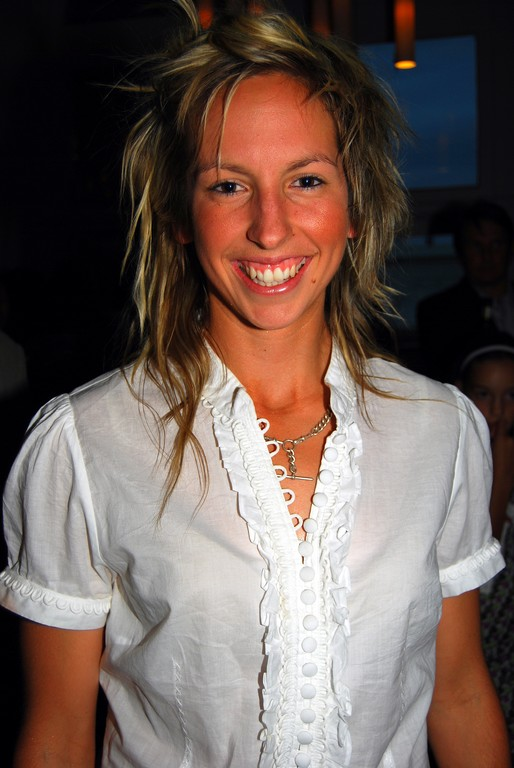

Personal information
- Full name: Sally Jean Shipard
- Date of birth: 20 October 1987 (age 39)
- Place of birth: Tumut, Australia
- Height: 1.74 m (5 ft 9 in)
- Position: Central midfielder

Youth career
- Wagga PCYC

Senior career*
| Years | Team | Apps | (Gls) |
| 2009–2014 | Canberra United | 30 | (4) |
| 2012 | → Bayer Leverkusen (loan) | 10 | (0) |
| Total | | 40 | (4) |

International career
| 2004–2006 | Australia U-20 | 17 | (4) |
| 2004–2011 | Australia | 59 | (4) |
- * Club domestic league appearances and goals

Sally Jean Shipard (born 20 October 1987) is a retired Australian international football (soccer) midfielder who played for Canberra United in the Australian W-League from 2009 to 2014 and for Bayer 04 Leverkusen in the German Bundesliga during the 2012 off-season.

== Biography ==
Shipard grew up in Wagga Wagga and played her junior football with Wagga PCYC. Sally, also known as Sal Bones, played from 2009 for the Canberra United in the W-League. In February 2012 she moved to the German Bundesliga, signing for last placed Bayer 04 Leverkusen until the end of the season.

She was a member of the Australian national team competing in the 2007 FIFA Women's World Cup and the 2011 FIFA Women's World Cup. She captained the Australian U-20 national team.

Shipard retired from football in April 2014, due to injuries.

== Career statistics ==
=== International goals ===
| # | Date | Venue | Opponent | Score | Result | Competition |
|---|---|---|---|---|---|---|
| 1 | 19 October 2005 | Patriots Stadium, El Paso, United States | Mexico | 2–0 | 2–0 | Friendly |
| 2 | 18 July 2006 | Hindmarsh Stadium, Adelaide, Australia | Myanmar | 1–0 | 2–0 | 2006 AFC Women's Asian Cup |
| 3 | 17 October 2010 | Suwon World Cup Stadium, Suwon, South Korea | Mexico | 3–0 | 3–1 | 2010 Peace Queen Cup |
| 4 | 20 June 2011 | Jahnstadion, Göttingen, Germany | Mexico | 2–2 | 3–2 | Friendly |

== Honours ==
=== Club ===
Canberra United

- W-League Championship: 2011–12
- W-League Premiership: 2011–12, 2013–14

=== Country ===
Australia

- AFC Women's Asian Cup: 2010
- OFC U-20 Women's Championship: 2004

=== Individual ===
- Canberra United Player of the Year: 2010–11
- Julie Dolan Medal: 2011–12
- FFA Female Footballer of the Year: 2012
