= Caitlin Munoz =

Australian soccer player

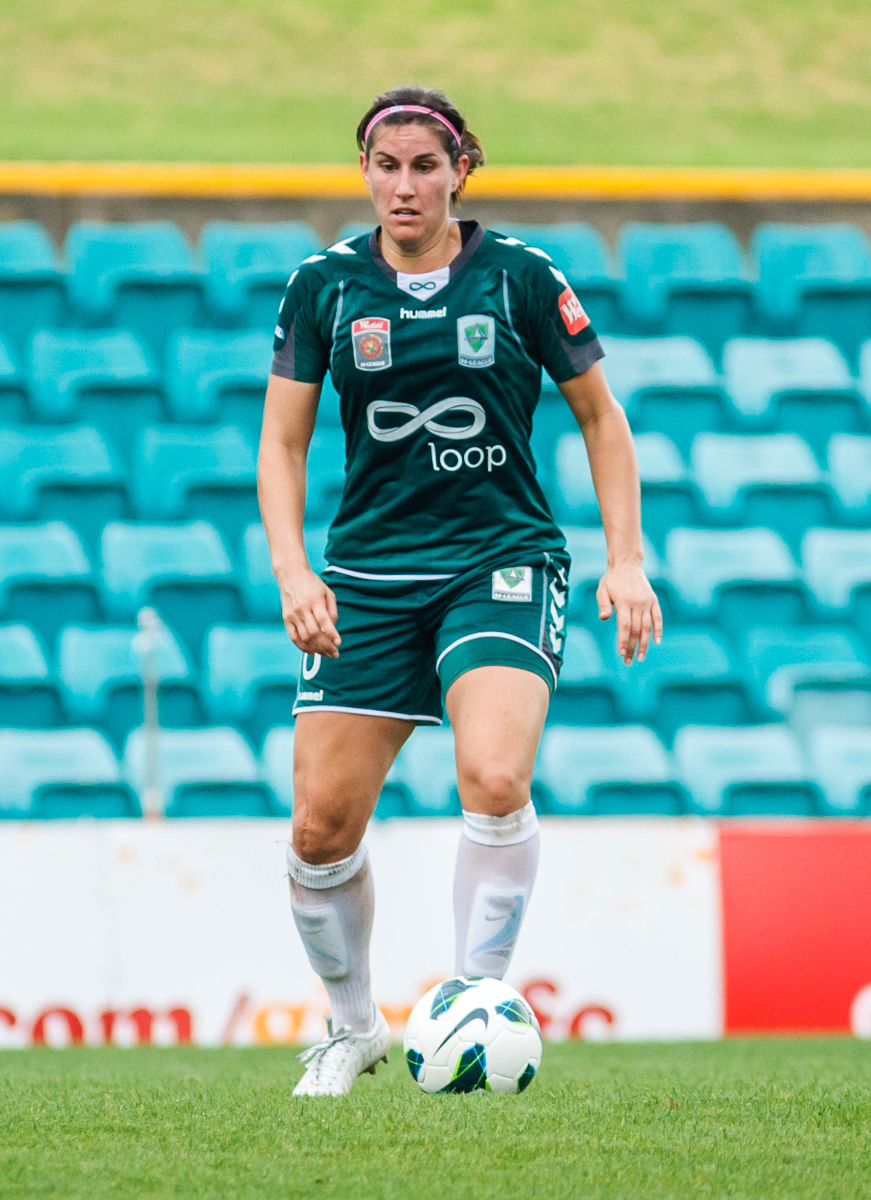
- Munoz playing for Canberra United in 2012

Personal information
- Full name: Caitlin Rose Munoz
- Date of birth: 4 October 1983 (age 43)
- Place of birth: Canberra, Australia
- Height: 1.70 m (5 ft 7 in)
- Position: Striker

Senior career*
Years	Team	Apps	(Gls)
1998–2004	Canberra Eclipse	40	(12)
2004	Boston Renegades	14	(12)
2008–2017	Canberra United	83	(22)

International career^{‡}
2002	Australia U20	7	(0)
2005–2016	Australia	57	(13)
- * Club domestic league appearances and goals as of 09:05, 8 November 2022 (UTC) ‡ National team caps and goals as of 29 November 2015

Caitlin Rose Munoz (born 4 October 1983) is an Australian soccer player who played for Canberra Eclipse in the Women's National Soccer League and Canberra United in the W-League. She retired from soccer after the end of the 2019 NPL ACT Women's season, scoring the winning goal for Belconnen United.

She played for the Boston Renegades in 2004, scoring 12 goals and serving nine assists in her 14 W-League appearances.

Munoz has represented Australia at the 2002 FIFA World Under 19 Women's Championship and the 2007 FIFA Women's World Cup.

== Honours ==
=== Club ===
Canberra United

- W-League Championship: 2011–12, 2014
- W-League Premiership: 2011–12, 2013–14

=== International ===
Australia

- OFC U-20 Women's Championship: 2002
- AFC Women's Asian Cup runner up: 2006

== International goals ==
No.	Date	Venue	Opponent	Score	Result	Competition
1.	30 May 2006	SS Anderson Reserve, Melbourne, Australia	Mexico	1–0	4–0	Friendly
2.	30 May 2006	SS Anderson Reserve, Melbourne, Australia	Mexico	2–0	4–0	Friendly
3.	30 May 2006	SS Anderson Reserve, Melbourne, Australia	Mexico	4–0	4–0	Friendly
4.	16 July 2006	Hindmarsh Stadium, Adelaide, Australia	South Korea	3–0	4–0	2006 AFC Women's Asian Cup
5.	27 July 2006	Hindmarsh Stadium, Adelaide, Australia	Japan	1–0	2–0	2006 AFC Women's Asian Cup
6.	30 July 2006	Hindmarsh Stadium, Adelaide, Australia	China	1–0	2–2 (a.e.t.) (2–4 p)	2006 AFC Women's Asian Cup
7.	2 November 2006	Suwon World Cup Stadium, Suwon, South Korea	Denmark	1–1	1–2	2006 Peace Queen Cup
8.	14 August 2007	Coffs Harbour International Stadium, Coffs Harbour, Australia	Chinese Taipei	1–0	7–0	2008 Summer Olympics qualification
9.	14 August 2007	Coffs Harbour International Stadium, Coffs Harbour, Australia	Chinese Taipei	5–0	7–0	2008 Summer Olympics qualification
10.	14 August 2007	Coffs Harbour International Stadium, Coffs Harbour, Australia	Chinese Taipei	6–0	7–0	2008 Summer Olympics qualification
11.	19 August 2007	Tianjin Olympic Center Stadium, Tianjin, China	China	2–0	3–1	Friendly
12.	23 May 2008	Sydney Football Stadium, Sydney, Australia	Canada	2–0	2–0	Friendly
