= Grace Gill =

Australian soccer player

Personal information
- Full name: Grace Gill-McGrath
- Place of birth: Darwin, Australia
- Height: 1.76 m (5 ft 9 in)
- Position: Centre midfielder

Senior career*
Years	Team	Apps	(Gls)
2008–2016	Canberra United	58	(0)
2013	Slovácko	4	(2)

International career^{‡}
2007	Australia	1	(0)
- * Club domestic league appearances and goals as of 6 March 2016 ‡ National team caps and goals as of 19 April 2013

Grace Gill-McGrath is a retired Australian soccer player who now works as a commentator.

== Career ==
Gill played for Canberra United in the Australian W-League and for Slovácko in the Czech Women's First League.

As of 2023 she works as a pundit and commentator in broadcast coverage of the A-League Women. Gill has also begun her professional transition to main commentary (play-by-play) by calling the Western United vs Brisbane Roar Women's A-League match for Paramount+ (Australia) on 21 January 2023.

== Playing career ==
=== Club career ===
==== Canberra United ====
Gill retired ahead of the 2016–17 W-League season.

==== Slovácko ====
In April 2013, Gill joined Slovácko.

=== International career ===
Gill played one match for Australia in 2007, in an 8–1 defeat of Hong Kong.

== Post-playing career ==
In 2019, Gill was elected to the board of Capital Football.
