= Ellie Brush =

Australian sportswoman

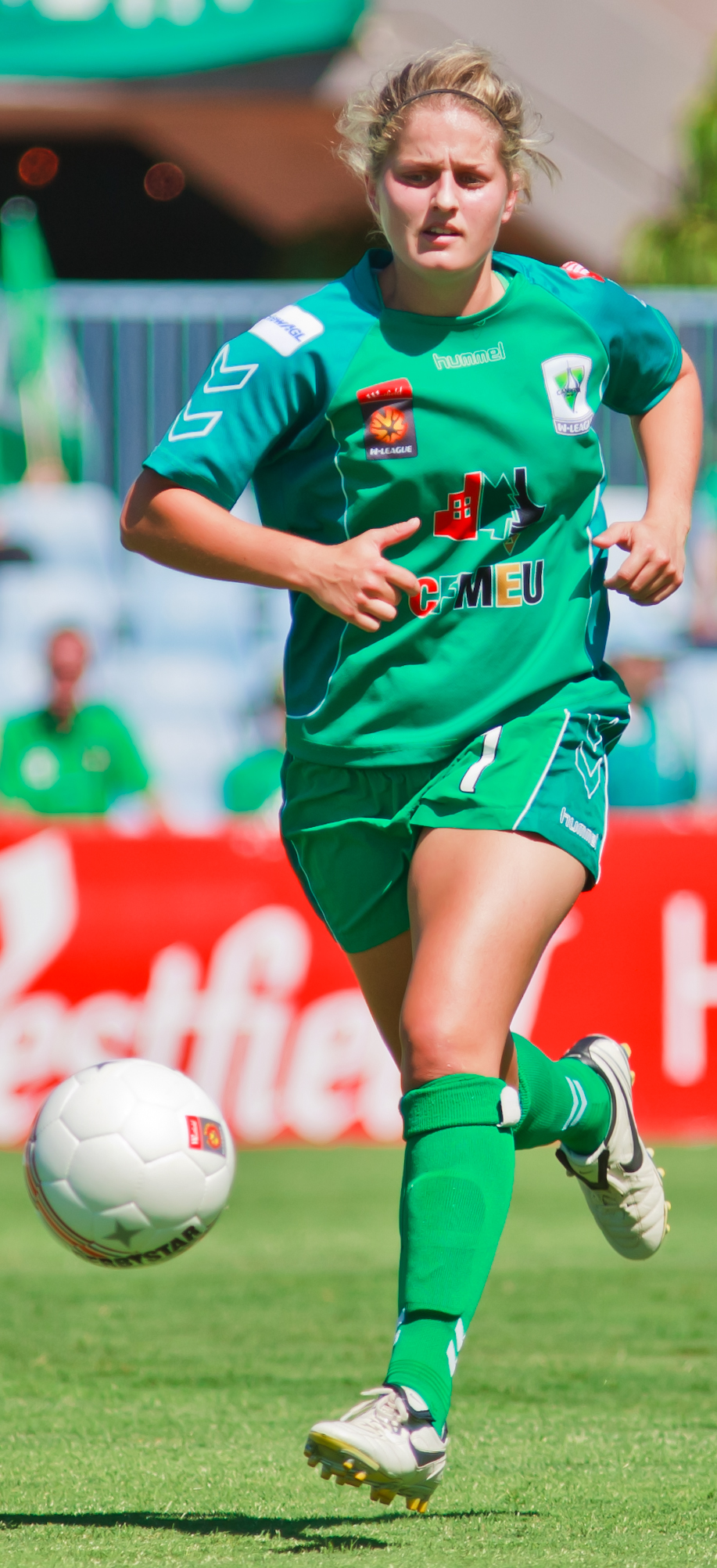
- Brush playing soccer for Canberra United in 2009
- Born: Ellie Katherine Brush; 19 August 1988 (age 38); Canberra, Australia
- Height: 1.65 m (5 ft 5 in)
Association football career
- Position: Defender
Youth career
- 1993–2003: Weston Molonglo FC
- 2003–2008: AIS
Senior career*
Years	Team	Apps	(Gls)
2008–2015	Canberra United	81	(14)
2013	Avaldsnes IL	11	(0)
2015–2016	Houston Dash	29	(1)
2015–2017	→ Canberra United	20	(3)
2017–2019	Western Sydney Wanderers	12	(2)
2019–2022	Sydney FC	19	(2)
2022–2023	Canberra United	13	(2)
International career^{‡}
2009–2023	Australia	2	(0)
- * Club domestic league appearances and goals as of 12 June 2023 ‡ National team caps and goals as of 28 February 2013
Australian rules football career
Personal information
- Debut: Round 2, 2017, Greater Western Sydney vs. Carlton, at Ikon Park
- Position: Defender / midfield
Playing career^{1}
Years	Club	Games (Goals)
2017–2020	Greater Western Sydney	20 (1)
- ^{1} Playing statistics correct to the end of the 2020 season.

Ellie Katherine Brush (born 19 August 1988) is an Australian sportswoman who plays soccer for Canberra United in the Australian A-League Women. She has also played Australian rules football for Greater Western Sydney in the AFL Women's (AFLW).

She also studied physiotherapy at Charles Sturt University.

== Club career ==
Brush joined Canberra United for their inaugural season in 2008 and was named captain, leading the team to the final.

Brush shared the captaincy with Lydia Williams for the 2009 season and has captained all the following seasons, including the 2011/12 season when Canberra United took home the W-League premiership. She received her 50th cap for Canberra United on 5 December 2012 against Perth Glory.

Brush played with the Norwegian team Avaldsnes IL for the 2013 season.

The Houston Dash of the National Women's Soccer League signed Brush on 20 May 2015.

Brush left the Dash via the Re-Entry Wire in 2016 to return to Canberra United.

On 16 September 2017, Brush left Canberra United, due to her difficulties juggling a soccer and AFL career. On 24 September 2017, she joined Western Sydney Wanderers, who due to their good working relationship with Greater Western Sydney would allow her to play both sports.

Brush joined Sydney FC for the 2019–20 W-League season.

In August 2022, Brush returned to Canberra United. In March 2023, Brush announced her retirement at the end of the season.

== International career ==
A strong season in the domestic league led to a call-up to the Matildas team in January 2009, making her international debut in a friendly against Italy. She made her second cap with the Matildas on 24 June 2012 in an international friendly match against New Zealand in Wollongong.

== Honours ==
=== Club ===
Canberra United

- W-League Championship: 2011–12, 2014–15
- W-League Premiership: 2011–12, 2013–14

== AFL Women's career ==
After signing as a rookie prior to the 2016 AFL Women's draft, Brush played six games for Greater Western Sydney in the 2017 AFL Women's season. Greater Western Sydney re-signed Brush for the 2018 season during the trade period in May 2017. In August 2020, Brush retired from Australian rules football to focus on soccer.
