= McKellar Park (Canberra) =

Stadium in Canberra, Australia

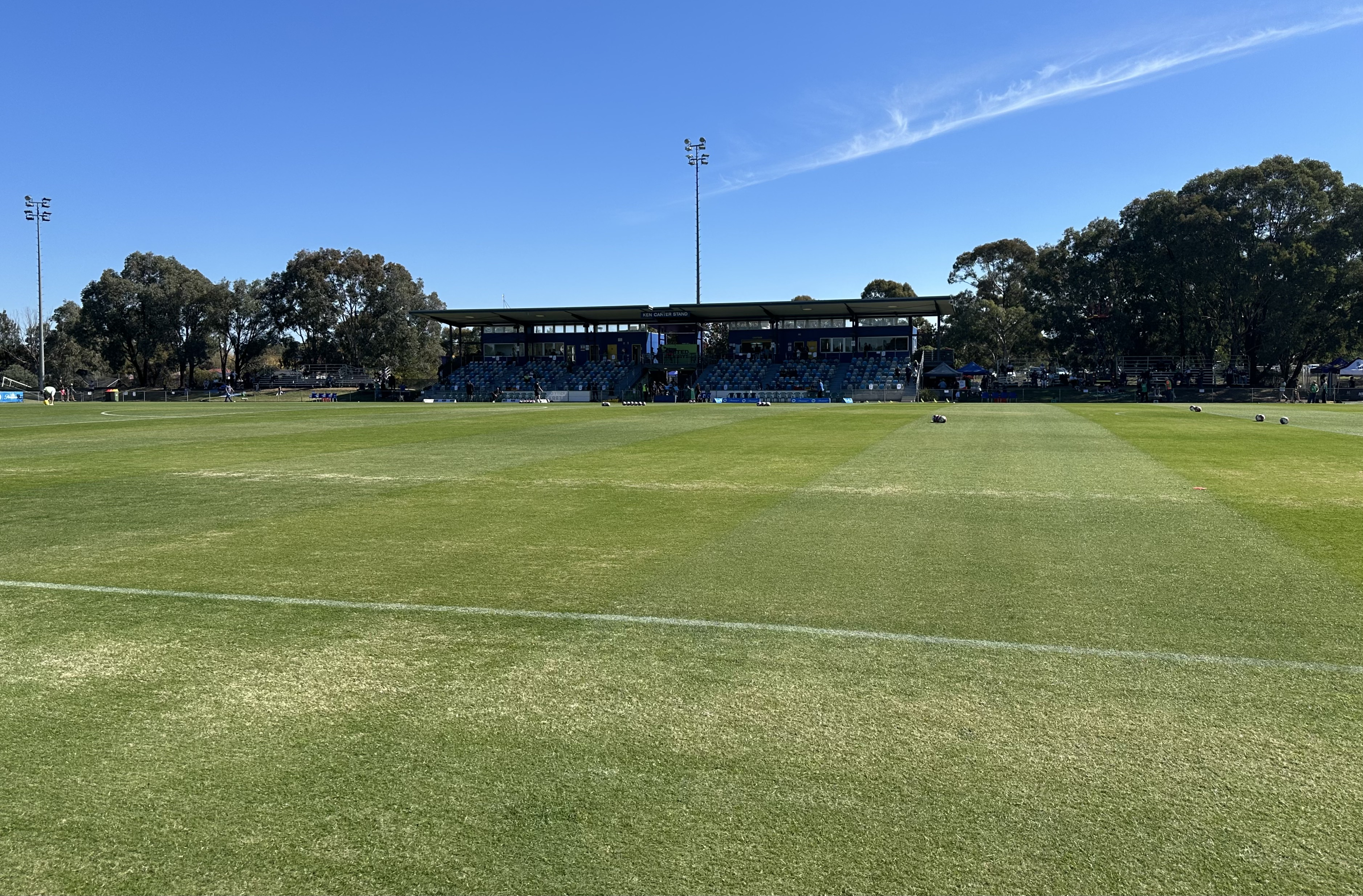
- McKellar Park in April 2026
- Interactive map of McKellar Park
- Former names: Belconnen Soccer Centre; McKellar Soccer Centre
- Address: 5 Walkley Place; McKellar, ACT
- Coordinates: 35°12′52″S 149°5′3″E
- Owner: Belconnen Soccer Club Ltd.
- Capacity: 3,500 (460 seated)
- Record attendance: 3,290 (Canberra United vs Melbourne Victory, 25 April 2026)

Construction
- Opened: 23 November 2002; 23 years ago
- Cost: A$1.10 million

Tenants
- Belconnen United FC; Canberra United FC

McKellar Park (formerly known as Belconnen Soccer Centre and McKellar Soccer Centre) is an association football stadium in the Canberra suburb of McKellar. The playing surface is rectangular in shape and is used almost exclusively for association football matches.

The venue is the home stadium of Belconnen United FC in the National Premier Leagues Capital Football (NPL Capital) and Canberra United FC in the A-League Women.

== Stadium facilities ==
The main grandstand is named after Ken Carter, who has been involved in the Belconnen Soccer Club since its formation and contributed significantly to the club's development. The grandstand contains approximately 600 seats, concession area, change rooms, public toilets, storage, moderate corporate areas and press facilities. It has been designed for easy lateral expansion if the need arises.

== Primary use ==
McKellar Park is primarily used by Canberra United FC for W-League regular season and finals matches during the summer months and Belconnen United FC in the National Premier Leagues Capital Football (The highest level of men's football in the ACT) in the winter months.

== Events History ==
=== Opening & First Game ===
The venue was opened on 23 November 2002 by ACT Senator Margaret Reid. The first match played at the ground was a New South Wales Premier League match between Belconnen United FC and Bonnyrigg White Eagles which ended in a 2–2 draw.

=== 2003 OFC Women's Championship ===
5 – 13 April 2003, the 2003 OFC Women's Championship was hosted at McKellar Park. The ground hosted all ten matches that was concurrently used as the OFC Women's World Cup Qualifying Tournament for the 2003 FIFA Women's World Cup held in the US. Australia, New Zealand, Papua New Guinea, Samoa and Cook Islands contested the tournament at McKellar. Australia won the tournament by finishing top of the group with twelve points after beating New Zealand 2–0 in front of 2,200 fans.

=== 2012 W-League Grand Final ===
28 January 2012, McKellar Park hosted the W-League grand final for the 2011/12 W-League season after Canberra United earned the right to host the grand final by finishing league premiers and winning their semi-final. The match between Canberra United and Brisbane Roar was sold out with 2,512 fans packing the stadium to cheer on the Canberra girls to their first championship title. There was plenty of early action during the match with three goals scored in the first half, Canberra taking a 2–1 lead to the half time break. Michelle Heyman pounced in the fifty-fifth minute to give United a 3–1 lead before a penalty to the visitors eight minutes later set up a grand stage finish to the match. With no more goals scored after the penalty, United ran out 3–2 victors to be crowned W-League champions for the first time.

=== 2015 Asian Cup ===
McKellar Park was selected as one of three venues to be used as a training venue for the 2015 Asian Cup in the ACT along with host venue Canberra Stadium and the second training venue Deakin Stadium. The stadium received an upgrade to its lighting as part of the $650,000 ACT facility upgrade fund for the tournament. Oman was the primary team that used McKellar Park for closed training sessions during the tournament while they were base in Canberra.

=== 2017 Young Socceroos ===
On 8 February 2017, the Australian under-20 national team (Young Socceroos) played a practice match at McKellar Park against Belconnen United's NPL first team. The Young Socceroos' Canberra based manager, Ufuk Talay, arranged the match for a very young squad with most of the players selected being seventeen years old. One Canberra player, Marc Tokich, was selected for the team.

=== A-League pre-season friendlies ===
Mckellar Park has a long standing of hosting pre-season matches primarily between Belconnen United and A-League opposition. The below table details these matches:

Year	Home team	Away team	Reference
2005	Belconnen United	Sydney FC	
2007	Belconnen United	Central Coast Mariners	
2008	Belconnen United	Central Coast Mariners	
2009	Belconnen United	Central Coast Mariners	
2010	Belconnen United	Central Coast Mariners	
2011	Belconnen United	Central Coast Mariners	
2012	Canberra Rockets (ACT PL Select XI)	Newcastle United Jets	
2013	ACT NPL All-Stars	Newcastle United Jets	
2015	Belconnen United	Sydney FC	
