= Nicole Begg =

Australian footballer

Personal information
- Full name: Nicole Begg
- Birth name: Nicole Sykes
- Date of birth: 15 December 1991 (age 34)
- Place of birth: Wahroonga, Sydney
- Height: 1.68 m (5 ft 6 in)
- Position: Left-back

Youth career
- Sass Soccer Club
- Amaroo Rangers
- Western NSW Panthers FC

Senior career*
Years	Team	Apps	(Gls)
- Dubbo Devils
2008–2013	Canberra United	49	(1)
2013	Kristianstads DFF	10	(1)
2013–2016	Canberra United	39	(2)
- * Club domestic league appearances and goals as of 6 March 2016

Nicole Begg (née Sykes; born 15 December 1991 in Sydney) is an Australian footballer, who last played for Canberra United in the Australian W-League.

== Personal life ==
In March 2014, she married Mick Begg.
