= W-League transfers for 2016–17 season =

This is a list of Australian soccer transfers for the 2016–17 W-League. Only moves featuring at least one W-League club are listed.

== Transfers ==
All players without a flag are Australian. Clubs without a flag are clubs participating in the W-League. All transfers between W-League clubs include a free transfer period in the off-season since prior to the 2017–18 season, the W-League didn't have multi-year contracts.

=== Pre-season ===
Date	Name	Moving from	Moving to
23 February 2016	Beattie Goad	Melbourne City	(United States) Stanford University
23 March 2016	(Scotland) Jen Beattie	Melbourne City	(England) Manchester City (end of loan)
23 June 2016	Monique Iannella	Melbourne City	(United States) Texas Longhorns
27 July 2016	Brianna Davey	Melbourne City	(Australia) Carlton (AFLW)
29 August 2016	Lisa De Vanna	Melbourne City	(United States) Orlando Pride
1 September 2016	Caitlin Munoz	Canberra United	Unattached
1 September 2016	(United States) Stephanie Ochs	(United States) Houston Dash	Canberra United
7 September 2016	Alex Chidiac	Melbourne City	Adelaide United
8 September 2016	Casey Dumont	Unattached	Western Sydney Wanderers
12 September 2016	Joanne Burgess	Retired	Western Sydney Wanderers
13 September 2016	Caitlin Foord	Perth Glory	Sydney FC
13 September 2016	Georgia Yeoman-Dale	Newcastle Jets	Sydney FC
16 September 2016	(United States) Alex Arlitt	(United States) FC Kansas City	Western Sydney Wanderers
16 September 2016	(United States) Kendall Fletcher	(United States) Seattle Reign FC	Western Sydney Wanderers
16 September 2016	(United States) Paige Nielsen	(Cyprus) Apollon	Western Sydney Wanderers
16 September 2016	(United States) Katie Stengel	(United States) Washington Spirit	Western Sydney Wanderers
20 September 2016	Racheal Quigley	(South Korea) Hwacheon KSPO	Adelaide United
25 September 2016	Teigen Allen	Sydney FC	Melbourne City
27 September 2016	(Scotland) Kim Little	Melbourne City	(United States) Seattle Reign FC (end of loan)
27 September 2016	Rosie Sutton	Adelaide United	Perth Glory
28 September 2016	Trudy Burke	Melbourne City	Canberra United
5 October 2016	(Japan) Yukari Kinga	(Japan) INAC Kobe Leonessa	Canberra United
5 October 2016	(United States) Alyssa Mautz	(United States) Chicago Red Stars	Perth Glory
5 October 2016	(Mexico) Arianna Romero	(Iceland) ÍBV	Perth Glory
7 October 2016	Tara Andrews	Newcastle Jets	Unattached
7 October 2016	(New Zealand) Hannah Bromley	Newcastle Jets	Retired
7 October 2016	Jacynta Galabadaarachchi	Unattached	Melbourne City
12 October 2016	Nikola Orgill	(Australia) North Shore Mariners	Western Sydney Wanderers
12 October 2016	Georgia Plessas	Unattached	Western Sydney Wanderers
12 October 2016	Sarah Yatim	Unattached	Western Sydney Wanderers
13 October 2016	(United States) Caprice Dydasco	Newcastle Jets	(United States) Washington Spirit (end of loan)
13 October 2016	Laura Hughes	(Australia) Woden Valley	Canberra United
13 October 2016	Clare Hunt	(Australia) Canberra FC	Canberra United
13 October 2016	Karly Roestbakken	(Australia) Monaro Panthers	Canberra United
14 October 2016	Rachel Alonso	(Australia) Calder United	Melbourne Victory
14 October 2016	Alex Cheal	(Australia) South Melbourne	Melbourne Victory
14 October 2016	Lia Privitelli	(Australia) Bulleen Lions	Melbourne Victory
14 October 2016	Ayesha Norrie	Brisbane Roar	Melbourne Victory
15 October 2016	Lydia Williams	(United States) Houston Dash	Melbourne City (loan)
19 October 2016	(United States) Celeste Boureille	(United States) Portland Thorns FC	Canberra United (loan)
19 October 2016	(United States) Jasmyne Spencer	(United States) Orlando Pride	Canberra United (loan)
20 October 2016	Hayley Raso	(United States) Portland Thorns FC	Canberra United (loan)
20 October 2016	Liana Danaskos	(Australia) Sydney University	Newcastle Jets
20 October 2016	Elizabeth O'Reilly	(Australia) Sydney University	Newcastle Jets
20 October 2016	Tara Pender	(Australia) Blacktown Spartans	Newcastle Jets
20 October 2016	Emma Stanbury	(Australia) Sydney University	Newcastle Jets
21 October 2016	Mackenzie Arnold	Perth Glory	Brisbane Roar
21 October 2016	(United States) Maddy Evans	(United States) Orlando Pride	Brisbane Roar
21 October 2016	Sunny Franco	Sydney FC	Brisbane Roar
21 October 2016	(Denmark) Nina Frausing-Pedersen	(Sweden) Rosengård	Brisbane Roar
21 October 2016	Brooke Spence	Unattached	Brisbane Roar
21 October 2016	Kaitlyn Torpey	Unattached	Brisbane Roar
21 October 2016	Georgina Worth	Unattached	Brisbane Roar
21 October 2016	Caitlin Friend	(Australia) Bulleen Lions	Melbourne Victory
21 October 2016	(Mexico) Bianca Henninger	(United States) Houston Dash	Melbourne Victory (loan)
21 October 2016	(United States) Samantha Johnson	(United States) Chicago Red Stars	Melbourne Victory (loan)
21 October 2016	Bethany Mason-Jones	(Australia) Calder United	Melbourne Victory
24 October 2016	Hannah Southwell	Newcastle Jets	Australia rugby sevens
25 October 2016	(Brazil) Mônica	(United States) Orlando Pride	Adelaide United (loan)
25 October 2016	(United States) Lauren Barnes	(United States) Seattle Reign FC	Melbourne City (loan)
25 October 2016	(United States) Erika Tymrak	(United States) FC Kansas City	Melbourne City (loan)
26 October 2016	Hannah Brewer	Melbourne City	Canberra United
28 October 2016	(United States) Jen Hoy	(United States) Chicago Red Stars	Newcastle Jets (loan)
29 October 2016	Siahn Bozanic	Newcastle Jets	Unattached
29 October 2016	Kobie Ferguson	Newcastle Jets	Unattached
31 October 2016	(United States) Danielle Colaprico	(United States) Chicago Red Stars	Adelaide United (loan)
31 October 2016	(Mexico) Sofia Huerta	(United States) Chicago Red Stars	Adelaide United (loan)
31 October 2016	(United States) Katie Naughton	(United States) Chicago Red Stars	Adelaide United (loan)
1 November 2016	(Mexico) Anisa Guajardo	Melbourne City	Unattached
1 November 2016	(United States) Arin Gilliland	(United States) Chicago Red Stars	Newcastle Jets (loan)
2 November 2016	(United States) Kelsey Wys	(United States) Washington Spirit	Newcastle Jets (loan)
3 November 2016	Lucy Adamopoulos	(Australia) West Adelaide	Adelaide United
3 November 2016	Eliza Campbell	(Norway) Klepp	Adelaide United
3 November 2016	Cheyenne Hammond	(Australia) Sturt Marion	Adelaide United
3 November 2016	Emily Hodgson	(Australia) Cumberland United	Adelaide United
3 November 2016	Claudia Jenkins	(Australia) Fulham United	Adelaide United
3 November 2016	Adriana Jones	Newcastle Jets	Adelaide United
3 November 2016	Dragana Kljajic	(Australia) Adelaide City	Adelaide United
3 November 2016	Ally Ladas	(Australia) Adelaide City	Adelaide United
3 November 2016	Stella Rigon	(Australia) Fulham United	Adelaide United
3 November 2016	Isabella Scalzi	(Australia) Adelaide City	Adelaide United
3 November 2016	Sarah Willacy	(Australia) Adelaide City	Adelaide United
3 November 2016	Kelsey Zafiridis	(Australia) Campbelltown City	Adelaide United
3 November 2016	Gabe Marzano	Brisbane Roar	Sydney FC
3 November 2016	Remy Siemsen	Unattached	Sydney FC
4 November 2016	Ruth Blackburn	Brisbane Roar	Unattached
4 November 2016	(United States) Haley Kopmeyer	Brisbane Roar	(United States) Seattle Reign FC (end of loan)
4 November 2016	Nicole Begg	Canberra United	Unattached
4 November 2016	Catherine Brown	Canberra United	Unattached
4 November 2016	Grace Gill	Canberra United	Retired
4 November 2016	Caitlin Munoz	Canberra United	Unattached
4 November 2016	Danielle Brogan	Perth Glory	Unattached
4 November 2016	(England) Katie Holtham	Perth Glory	Unattached
4 November 2016	Ellie Lamonte	Perth Glory	Unattached
4 November 2016	Ella Mastrantonio	Perth Glory	Unattached
4 November 2016	Shannon May	Perth Glory	Unattached
4 November 2016	Katie Schubert	Perth Glory	Unattached
4 November 2016	(United States) Michelle Betos	Sydney FC	(United States) Portland Thorns FC (end of loan)
4 November 2016	Renee Rollason	Sydney FC	Retired
4 November 2016	(England) Hannah Beard	Western Sydney Wanderers	Unattached
4 November 2016	Michelle Carney	Western Sydney Wanderers	Unattached
4 November 2016	(United States) Kendall Johnson	Western Sydney Wanderers	(United States) Portland Thorns FC (end of loan)
4 November 2016	Demi Koulizakis	Western Sydney Wanderers	Unattached
4 November 2016	(Canada) Carmelina Moscato	Western Sydney Wanderers	Retired
4 November 2016	Linda O'Neill	Western Sydney Wanderers	Unattached
4 November 2016	Rachael Soutar	Western Sydney Wanderers	Unattached
4 November 2016	(United States) Keelin Winters	Western Sydney Wanderers	Retired
4 November 2016	Abbey Lloyd	(Australia) South West Queensland Thunder	Brisbane Roar
4 November 2016	Natalie Tathem	Unattached	Brisbane Roar
4 November 2016	Kariah White	Unattached	Melbourne Victory
4 November 2016	Patricia Charalambous	Unattached	Perth Glory
4 November 2016	Roisin Connolly	Unattached	Perth Glory
4 November 2016	Jaymee Gibbons	Unattached	Perth Glory
4 November 2016	Melissa Maizels	Unattached	Perth Glory
4 November 2016	Abby Meakins	Unattached	Perth Glory
4 November 2016	Natasha Rigby	Unattached	Perth Glory
4 November 2016	Sarah Easthope	Unattached	Sydney FC
4 November 2016	Penny Petratos	Unattached	Sydney FC
4 November 2016	Sophie Hancock	Unattached	Western Sydney Wanderers
4 November 2016	Angelique Hristodoulou	Unattached	Western Sydney Wanderers
4 November 2016	Rachel Lowe	Unattached	Western Sydney Wanderers
4 November 2016	Courtney Newbon	Unattached	Western Sydney Wanderers
	Rachel Binning	Unattached	Melbourne City

=== Mid-season ===
Date	Name	Moving from	Moving to
14 November 2016	(United States) Beverly Yanez	(United States) Seattle Reign FC	Melbourne City (loan)
30 November 2016	(United States) Katelyn Rowland	(United States) Western New York Flash	Newcastle Jets (loan)
2 December 2016	Emily Kenshole	(Australia) Galaxy United	Melbourne Victory
9 December 2016	Alexandra Gummer	Unattached	Melbourne Victory
9 December 2016	(New Zealand) Kirsty Yallop	Unattached	Melbourne Victory
18 December 2016	Lisa De Vanna	Unattached	Canberra United
22 December 2016	(Nigeria) Francisca Ordega	(United States) Washington Spirit	Sydney FC (loan)
5 January 2017	Kahlia Hogg	(United States) Colorado Buffaloes	Canberra United
11 January 2017	Amy Harrison	Unattached	Sydney FC
2 February 2017	Claire Coelho	Newcastle Jets	Sydney FC

== Re-signings ==
Date	Name	Club
7 September 2016	Emily Condon	Adelaide United
8 September 2016	Ellie Carpenter	Western Sydney Wanderers
13 September 2016	Hannah Bacon	Sydney FC
13 September 2016	Nicola Bolger	Sydney FC
13 September 2016	Princess Ibini	Sydney FC
13 September 2016	Alanna Kennedy	Sydney FC
13 September 2016	Leena Khamis	Sydney FC
13 September 2016	Sham Khamis	Sydney FC
13 September 2016	Teresa Polias	Sydney FC
13 September 2016	Olivia Price	Sydney FC
13 September 2016	Elizabeth Ralston	Sydney FC
13 September 2016	Kyah Simon	Sydney FC
13 September 2016	Natalie Tobin	Sydney FC
13 September 2016	Servet Uzunlar	Sydney FC
19 September 2016	Michelle Heyman	Canberra United
19 September 2016	Ashleigh Sykes	Canberra United
22 September 2016	Ellie Brush	Canberra United
22 September 2016	Nickoletta Flannery	Canberra United
22 September 2016	Grace Maher	Canberra United
25 September 2016	Steph Catley	Melbourne City
25 September 2016	Larissa Crummer	Melbourne City
25 September 2016	Olivia Ellis	Melbourne City
27 September 2016	Melina Ayres	Melbourne City
27 September 2016	Tyla-Jay Vlajnic	Melbourne City
27 September 2016	Kim Carroll	Perth Glory
27 September 2016	(United States) Nikki Stanton	Perth Glory
7 October 2016	Amy Jackson	Melbourne City
7 October 2016	(New Zealand) Rebekah Stott	Melbourne City
7 October 2016	Marianna Tabain	Melbourne City
7 October 2016	Claire Coelho	Newcastle Jets
7 October 2016	Libby Copus-Brown	Newcastle Jets
7 October 2016	Cassidy Davis	Newcastle Jets
7 October 2016	Rhali Dobson	Newcastle Jets
7 October 2016	Jenna Kingsley	Newcastle Jets
7 October 2016	Brooke Miller	Newcastle Jets
7 October 2016	Sophie Nenadovic	Newcastle Jets
7 October 2016	Gema Simon	Newcastle Jets
7 October 2016	Clare Wheeler	Newcastle Jets
12 October 2016	Eliza Ammendolia	Western Sydney Wanderers
12 October 2016	Caitlin Cooper	Western Sydney Wanderers
12 October 2016	Chloe O'Brien	Western Sydney Wanderers
12 October 2016	Helen Petinos	Western Sydney Wanderers
12 October 2016	Alix Roberts	Western Sydney Wanderers
12 October 2016	Jada Whyman	Western Sydney Wanderers
14 October 2016	MelindaJ Barbieri	Melbourne Victory
14 October 2016	(Turkey) Gülcan Koca	Melbourne Victory
14 October 2016	Selin Kuralay	Melbourne Victory
14 October 2016	Annabelle Martin	Melbourne Victory
14 October 2016	Alex Natoli	Melbourne Victory
14 October 2016	Laura Spiranovic	Melbourne Victory
14 October 2016	Adriana Taranto	Melbourne Victory
14 October 2016	Melissa Taranto	Melbourne Victory
19 October 2016	(England) Natasha Dowie	Melbourne Victory
20 October 2016	(United States) Christine Nairn	Melbourne Victory
21 October 2016	Angela Beard	Brisbane Roar
21 October 2016	Amy Chapman	Brisbane Roar
21 October 2016	Maili Forbes	Brisbane Roar
21 October 2016	Katrina Gorry	Brisbane Roar
21 October 2016	Summer O'Brien	Brisbane Roar
21 October 2016	Clare Polkinghorne	Brisbane Roar
21 October 2016	Allira Toby	Brisbane Roar
21 October 2016	Cortnee Vine	Brisbane Roar
25 October 2016	(Wales) Jess Fishlock	Melbourne City
26 October 2016	Georgia Boric	Canberra United
30 October 2016	Laura Alleway	Melbourne City
30 October 2016	Aivi Luik	Melbourne City
1 November 2016	Morgan Aquino	Perth Glory
1 November 2016	Carla Bennett	Perth Glory
1 November 2016	Caitlin Doeglas	Perth Glory
1 November 2016	Samantha Kerr	Perth Glory
2 November 2016	(United States) Megan Oyster	Newcastle Jets
3 November 2016	Grace Abbey	Adelaide United
3 November 2016	Georgia Campagnale	Adelaide United
3 November 2016	Emily Condon	Adelaide United
3 November 2016	Marijana Rajcic	Adelaide United
4 November 2016	Tameka Butt	Brisbane Roar
4 November 2016	Emily Gielnik	Brisbane Roar
4 November 2016	Emma Checker	Canberra United
4 November 2016	Jenna McCormick	Canberra United
4 November 2016	Ashlee Brodigan	Newcastle Jets
4 November 2016	Grace MacIntyre	Newcastle Jets
4 November 2016	Shawn Billam	Perth Glory
4 November 2016	Sarah Carroll	Perth Glory
4 November 2016	Gabrielle Dal Busco	Perth Glory
4 November 2016	(United States) Vanessa DiBernardo	Perth Glory
4 November 2016	Emily Henderson	Perth Glory
4 November 2016	Angelique Stannett	Perth Glory
4 November 2016	Erica Halloway	Western Sydney Wanderers
7 November 2016	Julia De Angelis	Canberra United
	Emily Shields	Melbourne City
	Kelsey Quinn	Melbourne City
