= 2015–16 Newcastle Jets FC (women) season =

8th season in existence of Newcastle Jets FC (women)

Newcastle Jets (women)
2015–16 season
- Owner: Football Federation Australia
- Head Coach: Craig Deans
- Stadium: Wanderers Oval; McDonald Jones Stadium (doubleheaders)
- W-League: 6th
- W-League Finals: DNQ
- Top goalscorer: Tara Andrews (3)
- Biggest win: 4–0 vs. Brisbane Roar (A) (29 November 2015); W-League
- Biggest defeat: 1–5 vs. Adelaide United (H) (19 December 2015); W-League
Home colours	Away colours	Third colours

The 2015–16 season was Newcastle Jets Football Club (women)'s eighth season in the W-League. Newcastle Jets finished 6th in their W-League season.

== Players ==
Note: Flags indicate national team as defined under FIFA eligibility rules; some limited exceptions apply. Players may hold more than one non-FIFA nationality.

No.	Pos.	Nation	Player
1	GK	AUS	Hannah Southwell
2	DF	AUS	Sophie Nenadovic
3	DF	AUS	Georgia Yeoman-Dale
4	DF	USA	Megan Montefusco
5	DF	USA	Caprice Dydasco
6	MF	AUS	Cassidy Davis
7	DF	AUS	Gema Simon
8	MF	AUS	Kobie Ferguson
9	FW	AUS	Tara Andrews
10	FW	AUS	Rhali Dobson

No.	Pos.	Nation	Player
11	FW	AUS	Ashlee Brodigan
12	MF	AUS	Chloe Logarzo
13	FW	AUS	Adriana Jones
14	MF	AUS	Brooke Miller
15	MF	AUS	Libby Copus-Brown
16	FW	AUS	Siahn Bozanic
17	FW	AUS	Jenna Kingsley
18	MF	AUS	Clare Wheeler
19	DF	NZL	Hannah Bromley
20	GK	AUS	Claire Coelho

== Transfers and contracts ==
=== Transfers in ===
No.	Position	Player	Transferred from	Type/fee	Date	Ref.
8	MF	Kobie Ferguson	(Australia) Emerging Jets	Free transfer	17 September 2015	
11	FW	Ashlee Brodigan	(Australia) Emerging Jets	Free transfer	17 September 2015	
7	DF	Gema Simon	Melbourne Victory	Free transfer	7 October 2015	
12	MF	Chloe Logarzo	Sydney FC	Free transfer	7 October 2015	
13	FW	Adriana Jones	(Australia) Central Coast Mariners	Free transfer	7 October 2015	
17	FW	Jenna Kingsley	Western Sydney Wanderers	Free transfer	7 October 2015	
19	DF	(New Zealand) Hannah Bromley	(Australia) Northbridge	Free transfer	7 October 2015	
4	DF	(United States) Megan Montefusco	(United States) Washington Spirit	Loan	8 October 2015	
5	DF	(United States) Caprice Dydasco	(United States) Washington Spirit	Loan	8 October 2015	

=== Transfers out ===
No.	Position	Player	Transferred to	Type/fee	Date	Ref.
—	DF	Emma Stanbury	(Australia) Manly United	Free transfer	13 April 2015	
10	MF	Emily van Egmond	(Germany) FFC Frankfurt	Free transfer	12 June 2015	
4	MF	Ashley Spina	Brisbane Roar	Free transfer	3 October 2015	
3	MF	Hayley Crawford	Retired		13 October 2015	
5	DF	(United States) Katherine Reynolds	(United States) Washington Spirit	Free transfer	13 October 2015	
6	MF	(United States) Angela Salem	(United States) Washington Spirit	Free transfer	13 October 2015	
7	MF	(United States) Tori Huster	(United States) Washington Spirit	Loan return	13 October 2015	
8	MF	Amber Neilson	Retired		13 October 2015	
17	MF	Grace Macintyre	Unattached	Free transfer	13 October 2015	
21	GK	Renee Rudder	(Australia) Moreton Bay United	Free transfer	13 October 2015	

=== Contract extensions ===
No.	Position	Player	Duration	Date	Ref.
2	DF	Georgia Yeoman-Dale	1 year	6 September 2015	
9	FW	Tara Andrews	1 year	6 September 2015	
10	FW	Rhali Dobson	1 year	6 September 2015	
15	MF	Libby Copus-Brown	1 year	6 September 2015	
16	MF	Cassidy Davis	1 year	6 September 2015	
20	GK	Claire Coelho	1 year	6 September 2015	
1	GK	Hannah Southwell	1 year	17 September 2015	
2	DF	Sophie Nenadovic	1 year	17 September 2015	
14	MF	Brooke Miller	1 year	17 September 2015	
20	GK	Claire Coelho	1 year	17 September 2015	

== Competitions ==
=== Overall record ===
Competition	First match	Last match	Starting round	Final position	Record							
Competition	First match	Last match	Starting round	Final position	Pld	W	D	L	GF	GA	GD	Win %
W-League	24 October 2015	17 January 2016	Matchday 1	6th	12	3	4	5	9	12	−3	25.00
Total					12	3	4	5	9	12	−3	25.00

Source: Competitions

=== W-League ===
==== League table ====
Pos	Team	Pld	W	D	L	GF	GA	GD	Pts	Qualification
1	Melbourne City (C)	12	12	0	0	38	4	+34	36	Qualification to Finals series
2	Canberra United	12	8	2	2	26	8	+18	26	Qualification to Finals series
3	Sydney FC	12	6	1	5	15	21	−6	19	Qualification to Finals series
4	Brisbane Roar	12	5	1	6	16	17	−1	16	Qualification to Finals series
5	Adelaide United	12	3	4	5	18	19	−1	13	
6	Newcastle Jets	12	3	4	5	9	12	−3	13	
7	Western Sydney Wanderers	12	3	3	6	15	25	−10	12	
8	Perth Glory	12	3	2	7	10	23	−13	11	
9	Melbourne Victory	12	2	1	9	10	28	−18	7	

Source: A-Leagues
Rules for classification: 1) points; 2) goal difference; 3) number of goals scored.
(C) Champions

==== Results summary ====
Overall								Home						Away					
Pld	W	D	L	GF	GA	GD	Pts	W	D	L	GF	GA	GD	W	D	L	GF	GA	GD
12	3	4	5	9	12	−3	13	0	2	4	2	9	−7	3	2	1	7	3	+4

Source: worldfootball.net

==== Results by round ====
Round	1	2	3	4	5	6	7	8	9	10	11	12	13	14
Ground	B	A	A	H	H	A	A	B	H	H	A	H	A	H
Result	X	D	W	L	D	D	W	X	L	L	W	L	L	D
Position	6	6	4	5	7	6	3	4	4	5	5	5	6	6
Points	0	1	4	4	5	6	9	9	9	9	12	12	12	13

Source: worldfootball.net
A = Away; H = Home; B = Bye; W = Win; D = Draw; L = Loss; X = Bye

==== Matches ====
Win Draw Loss

24 October 2015 2	Perth Glory	0–0	Newcastle Jets	Perth
16:00 AWST		Report		Stadium: Ashfield Reserve; Referee: Rebecca Durcau

31 October 2015 3	Melbourne Victory	0–1	Newcastle Jets	Melbourne
15:00 AEDT		Report	Logarzo 47'	Stadium: Hume City Stadium; Referee: Kate Jacewicz

7 November 2015 4	Newcastle Jets	1–2	Western Sydney Wanderers	Newcastle
14:00 AEDT	Kingsley 3'	Report	O'Brien 57'; Moscato 90+2'	Stadium: Wanderers Oval; Attendance: 1,724; Referee: Kelly Jones

14 November 2015 5	Newcastle Jets	0–0	Canberra United	Newcastle
14:00 AEDT		Report		Stadium: Wanderers Oval; Attendance: 856; Referee: Kate Jacewicz

22 November 2015 6	Adelaide United	1–1	Newcastle Jets	Adelaide
14:00 AEDT	Powell 60'	Report	Andrews 83'	Stadium: Coopers Stadium; Referee: Kelly Jones

29 November 2015 7	Brisbane Roar	0–4	Newcastle Jets	Brisbane
15:00 AEDT		Report	Konjarski 22'; Dydasco 55'; Kingsley 75'; Montefusco 83'	Stadium: A.J. Kelly Park; Referee: Rachael Mitchenson

13 December 2015 9	Newcastle Jets	0–1	Melbourne City	Newcastle
14:00 AEDT		Report	Goad 44'	Stadium: McDonald Jones Stadium; Attendance: 3,292; Referee: Rachael Mitchenson

19 December 2015 10	Newcastle Jets	1–5	Adelaide United	Newcastle
15:00 AEDT	Andrews 19' (pen.)	Report	Dahlkemper 14', 90+4'; Milne 26'; Sutton 75'; Condon 90'	Stadium: Wanderers Oval; Referee: Kelly Jones

27 December 2015 11	Western Sydney Wanderers	0–1	Newcastle Jets	Sydney
15:00 AEDT		Report	Andrews 41'	Stadium: Popondetta Park; Referee: Lara Lee

3 January 2016 12	Newcastle Jets	0–1	Melbourne Victory	Newcastle
14:00 AEDT		Report	Dowie 13'	Stadium: McDonald Jones Stadium; Referee: Rebecca Durcau

9 January 2016 13	Sydney FC	2–0	Newcastle Jets	Sydney
14:00 AEDT	Simon 33' (pen.); Khamis 59'	Report		Stadium: ANZ Stadium; Referee: Kate Jacewicz

17 January 2016 14	Newcastle Jets	0–0	Brisbane Roar	Newcastle
14:00 AEDT		Report		Stadium: McDonald Jones Stadium; Referee: Kelly Jones

== Statistics ==
=== Appearances and goals ===
Includes all competitions. Players with no appearances not included in the list.

No.	Pos	Nat	Player	Total		W-League	
No.	Pos	Nat	Player	Apps	Goals	Apps	Goals
1	GK	(Australia) AUS	Hannah Southwell	12	0	12	0
2	DF	(Australia) AUS	Sophie Nenadovic	8	0	3+5	0
3	DF	(Australia) AUS	Georgia Yeoman-Dale	9	0	9	0
4	DF	(United States) USA	Megan Montefusco	12	1	12	1
5	DF	(United States) USA	Caprice Dydasco	12	1	12	1
7	DF	(Australia) AUS	Gema Simon	12	0	12	0
19	DF	(New Zealand) NZL	Hannah Bromley	11	0	11	0
6	MF	(Australia) AUS	Cassidy Davis	12	0	12	0
8	MF	(Australia) AUS	Kobie Ferguson	5	0	0+5	0
12	MF	(Australia) AUS	Chloe Logarzo	10	1	10	1
14	MF	(Australia) AUS	Brooke Miller	4	0	2+2	0
15	MF	(Australia) AUS	Libby Copus-Brown	3	0	0+3	0
18	MF	(Australia) AUS	Clare Wheeler	11	0	1+10	0
9	FW	(Australia) AUS	Tara Andrews	10	3	10	3
10	FW	(Australia) AUS	Rhali Dobson	11	0	9+2	0
11	FW	(Australia) AUS	Ashlee Brodigan	1	0	0+1	0
13	FW	(Australia) AUS	Adriana Jones	8	1	3+5	1
16	FW	(Australia) AUS	Siahn Bozanic	4	0	2+2	0
17	FW	(Australia) AUS	Jenna Kingsley	12	2	12	2

=== Disciplinary record ===
Includes all competitions. The list is sorted by squad number when total cards are equal. Players with no cards not included in the list.

Rank	No.	Pos.	Nat.	Player	W-League			Total							
Rank	No.	Pos.	Nat.	Player	Yellow card	(yellow card) (yellow-red card)	Red card	Yellow card	(yellow card) (yellow-red card)	Red card					
Rank	No.	Pos.	Nat.	Player	1	2	DF	(Australia)	Sophie Nenadovic	1	1	0	1	1	0
2	19	DF	(New Zealand)	Hannah Bromley	4	0	0	4	0	0					
3	12	MF	(Australia)	Chloe Logarzo	2	0	0	2	0	0					
3	14	MF	(Australia)	Brooke Miller	2	0	0	2	0	0					
5	3	DF	(Australia)	Georgia Yeoman-Dale	1	0	0	1	0	0					
5	5	DF	(United States)	Caprice Dydasco	1	0	0	1	0	0					
5	6	DF	(Australia)	Cassidy Davis	1	0	0	1	0	0					
5	7	DF	(Australia)	Gema Simon	1	0	0	1	0	0					
Total					13	1	0	13	1	0					

=== Clean sheets ===
Includes all competitions. The list is sorted by squad number when total clean sheets are equal. Numbers in parentheses represent games where both goalkeepers participated and both kept a clean sheet; the number in parentheses is awarded to the goalkeeper who was substituted on, whilst a full clean sheet is awarded to the goalkeeper who was on the field at the start and end of play. Goalkeepers with no clean sheets not included in the list.

Rank	No.	Nat.	Goalkeeper	W-League	Total
1	1	(Australia)	Hannah Southwell	6	6
