= 2015–16 Adelaide United FC (women) season =

Adelaide United W-League
2015–16 season
- Manager: Jamie Harnwell
- Stadium: Adelaide Shores Football Centre, Adelaide; Coopers Stadium, Adelaide
- W-League: 5th
- W-League finals series: DNQ
- Top goalscorer: Abigail Dahlkemper, Rosie Sutton (5 goals)
Home colours	Away colours

The 2015–16 Adelaide United W-League season was the club's eighth season in the W-League.

== Players ==
=== Squad information ===
Note: Flags indicate national team as defined under FIFA eligibility rules; some limited exceptions apply. Players may hold more than one non-FIFA nationality.

No.	Pos.	Nation	Player
1	GK	USA	Kaitlyn Savage
2	DF	AUS	Lauren Steer
3	DF	AUS	Alexandra Gummer
4	MF	USA	Sarah Killion
5	FW	AUS	Allira Toby
6	DF	AUS	Chantelle Ryder
8	MF	AUS	Emily Condon
9	FW	AUS	Marijana Rajcic (Captain)
10	MF	AUS	Georgia Campagnale

No.	Pos.	Nation	Player
11	FW	AUS	Rosie Sutton
12	DF	AUS	Elizabeth Milne
13	DF	USA	Abigail Dahlkemper
14	DF	AUS	Grace Abbey
15	DF	AUS	Matilda McNamara
17	FW	AUS	Tiarn Powell
18	MF	AUS	Lorena Maggio
19	MF	AUS	Gaby Bentley
20	GK	AUS	Claudia Jenkins
21	FW	AUS	Isabel Hodgson

== Managerial staff ==
Position	Name
Head coach	(Australia) Jamie Harnwell
Assistant coach	
Team manager	

== Squad statistics ==
N	Pos.	Nat.	Name	Total					W-League
N	Pos.	Nat.	Name	Apps	Goals	Yellow card	Second yellow card	Red card	Apps	Goals	Yellow card	Second yellow card	Red card
1	GK	(United States)	Kaitlyn Savage	12	0	0	0	0	12+0	0	0	0	0
2	DF	(Australia)	Lauren Steer	12	0	2	0	0	11+1	0	2	0	0
3	DF	(Australia)	Alexandra Gummer	11	1	2	0	0	11+0	1	2	0	0
4	MF	(United States)	Sarah Killion	12	1	1	0	0	12+0	1	1	0	0
5	FW	(Australia)	Allira Toby	12	0	0	0	0	5+7	0	0	0	0
6	DF	(Australia)	Chantelle Ryder	10	0	2	0	0	8+2	0	2	0	0
8	MF	(Australia)	Emily Condon	12	2	0	0	0	10+2	2	0	0	0
9	FW	(Australia)	Marijana Rajcic	4	0	0	0	0	2+2	0	0	0	0
10	MF	(Australia)	Georgia Campagnale	12	0	0	0	0	5+7	0	0	0	0
11	FW	(Australia)	Rosie Sutton	12	5	1	0	0	12+0	5	1	0	0
12	DF	(Australia)	Elizabeth Milne	12	1	3	0	0	12+0	1	3	0	0
13	DF	(United States)	Abigail Dahlkemper	12	5	3	0	0	12+0	5	3	0	0
14	DF	(Australia)	Grace Abbey	4	0	0	0	0	2+2	0	0	0	0
15	DF	(Australia)	Matilda McNamara	2	0	0	0	0	0+2	0	0	0	0
17	FW	(Australia)	Tiarn Powell	11	3	0	0	0	11+0	3	0	0	0
18	MF	(Australia)	Lorena Maggio	11	0	2	0	0	5+6	0	2	0	0
19	MF	(Australia)	Gaby Bentley	2	0	0	0	0	0+2	0	0	0	0
20	GK	(Australia)	Claudia Jenkins	0	0	0	0	0	0+0	0	0	0	0
21	FW	(Australia)	Isabel Hodgson	2	0	0	0	0	2+0	0	0	0	0

- Source: au.women.soccerway.com
- (yellow card) = Number of bookings; (second yellow card) = Number of sending offs after a second yellow card; (red card) = Number of sending offs by a direct red card.

== Competitions ==
=== W-League ===
==== League table ====
Pos	Team	Pld	W	D	L	GF	GA	GD	Pts	Qualification
1	Melbourne City (C)	12	12	0	0	38	4	+34	36	Qualification to Finals series
2	Canberra United	12	8	2	2	26	8	+18	26	Qualification to Finals series
3	Sydney FC	12	6	1	5	15	21	−6	19	Qualification to Finals series
4	Brisbane Roar	12	5	1	6	16	17	−1	16	Qualification to Finals series
5	Adelaide United	12	3	4	5	18	19	−1	13	
6	Newcastle Jets	12	3	4	5	9	12	−3	13	
7	Western Sydney Wanderers	12	3	3	6	15	25	−10	12	
8	Perth Glory	12	3	2	7	10	23	−13	11	
9	Melbourne Victory	12	2	1	9	10	28	−18	7	

Source: A-Leagues
Rules for classification: 1) points; 2) goal difference; 3) number of goals scored.
(C) Champions

==== Results summary ====
Overall								Home						Away					
Pld	W	D	L	GF	GA	GD	Pts	W	D	L	GF	GA	GD	W	D	L	GF	GA	GD
12	3	4	5	18	19	−1	13	0	4	2	6	9	−3	3	0	3	12	10	+2

Source: Competitive Matches

==== Results by round ====
Round	1	2	3	4	5	6	7	8	9	10	11	12	13	14
Ground	H	B	A	A	A	H	H	H	A	A	B	H	A	H
Result	D	✖	W	W	L	D	L	D	L	W	✖	L	L	D
Position	4	5	3	2	2	2	5	5	5	4	4	4	5	5

Source: Competitive Matches
A = Away; H = Home; B = Bye; W = Win; D = Draw; L = Loss

==== Matches ====
17 October 2015 1	Adelaide United	2–2	Western Sydney Wanderers	Adelaide
15:00 ACDT	Killion 41'; Powell 62'	Report	Winters 3'; Cooper 17'	Stadium: Adelaide Shores Football Centre; Attendance: 602; Referee: Casey Reibelt

1 November 2015 3	Brisbane Roar	1–2	Adelaide United	Redland City
15:00 AEST	Gorry 22'	Report	Sutton 9'; Condon 51'	Stadium: Cleveland Showgrounds; Attendance: 1,010; Referee: Rachel Mitchenson

8 November 2015 4	Melbourne Victory	0–4	Adelaide United	Melbourne
15:00 AEDT		Report	Sutton 13', 55', 68' (pen.); Powell 33'	Stadium: Epping Stadium; Referee: Katie Patterson

14 November 2015 5	Melbourne City	2–0	Adelaide United	Melbourne
16:00 AEDT	Crummer 43'; Fishlock 71'	Report		Stadium: CB Smith Reserve; Referee: Rebecca Durcau

22 November 2015 6	Adelaide United	1–1	Newcastle Jets	Adelaide
13:30 ACDT	Powell 60'	Report	Andrews 83'	Stadium: Coopers Stadium; Referee: Kelly Jones

27 November 2015 7	Adelaide United	0–1	Sydney FC	Adelaide
19:00 ACDT		Report	Spencer 68'	Stadium: Adelaide Shores Football Centre; Referee: Kate Jacewicz

6 December 2015 8	Adelaide United	1–1	Perth Glory	Adelaide
19:30 ACDT	Gummer 75'	Report	Billam 7'	Stadium: Adelaide Shores Football Centre; Referee: Rebecca Durcau

12 December 2015 9	Canberra United	4–0	Adelaide United	Canberra
16:00 AEDT	Heyman 9', 84'; McCormick 15'; Pérez 90+3' (pen.)	Report		Stadium: McKellar Park; Referee: Kelly Jones

19 December 2015 10	Newcastle Jets	1–5	Adelaide United	Newcastle
15:00 AEDT	Andrews 18' (pen.)	Report	Dahlekemper 13', 90+5'; Toby 25'; Sutton 74'; Condon 90'	Stadium: Magic Park; Attendance: 525; Referee: Kelly Jones

3 January 2016 12	Adelaide United	1–3	Brisbane Roar	Adelaide
15:00 ACDT	Dahlkemper 90+4'	Report	Gielnik 26'; Yallop 40'; Marzano 41'	Stadium: Adelaide Shores Football Centre; Referee: Kate Jacewicz

10 January 2016 13	Perth Glory	2–1	Adelaide United	Perth
16:00 AWST	DiBernardo 64', 78'	Report	Dahlkemper 84'	Stadium: Ashfield Reserve; Referee: Lara Lee

15 January 2016 14	Adelaide United	1–1	Canberra United	Adelaide
19:00 ACDT	Dahlkemper 43'	Report	Pérez 23' (pen.)	Stadium: Adelaide Shores Football Centre; Referee: Casey Reibelt

== See also ==
- 2015–16 Adelaide United FC season
