= List of Brisbane Roar FC (women) seasons =

This is a list of seasons played by Brisbane Roar W.F.C, formally Queensland Roar (2008/09 season), the women's section of Australian football club Brisbane Roar F.C since its creation in 2008.

== Key ==
Key to league competitions:

- A-League Women − formally the W-League (2008/09−2020/21), Australia's top women's football league. The competition was established in 2008.
- AFC Women's Club Championship − the top tier women's football club competition in the Asian Football Confederation, The competition was established in 2019.
- FIFA Women's Club World Cup (proposed) − the top tier women's football club competition.
- International Women's Club Championship (defunct) − the top tier women's football club competition at the time. The competition was established in 2012 and discontinued in 2014.

Key to colours and symbols:

1st or W	Winners
2nd or RU	Runners-up
3rd	Third
↑	Promoted
↓	Relegated
♦	Top scorer in division

Key to league record:

- Season = The year and article of the season
- Pos = Final position
- P = Games played
- W = Games won
- D = Games drawn
- L = Games lost
- F = Goals scored
- A = Goals against
- Pts = Points

Key to cup record:

- En-dash (–) = Brisbane Roar W.F.C. did not participate
- DNE = The club did not enter cup play
- QR1 = First qualification round
- QR2 = Second qualification round, etc.
- Group = Group stage
- GS2 = Second group stage
- R1 = First round
- R2 = Second round, etc.
- R16 = Round of 16
- QF = Quarter-finals
- SF = Semi-finals
- RU = Runners-up
- W = Winners

== Seasons ==
Results of league and cup competitions by season
Season	League											Asia / Worldwide		Top scorer	
Season	Division	P	W	D	L	F	A	GD	Pts	Pos	Finals Series	Competition	Result	Top scorer	
2008–09^{a}	W−League	10	8	1	1	27	7	+20	25	1st	W			Courtney Beutel	6
2009	W−League	10	6	3	1	24	7	+17	21	3rd	RU			Tameka Yallop	5
2010–11	W−League	10	6	3	1	17	7	+10	21	2nd	W			Tameka Yallop	7
2011–12	W−League	10	6	3	1	20	11	+9	21	2nd	RU			Emily Gielnik	9
2012–13	W−League	12	8	2	2	28	15	+13	26	1st	SF	—^{b}	—	Tameka Yallop	8
2013–14	W−League	12	7	2	3	22	16	+6	23	4th	RU	—^{b}	—	Katrina Gorry	5
2014	W−League	12	4	2	6	18	19	−1	14	6th	—	—^{b}	—	Tameka Yallop	7
2015–16	W−League	12	5	1	6	16	17	−1	16	4th	SF			7 players^{c}	2
2016–17	W−League	12	4	1	7	15	21	−6	13	7th	—			Tameka Yallop; Katrina Gorry	5
2017–18	W−League	12	9	1	2	21	12	+9	28	1st	SF			Allira Toby	5
2018–19	W−League	12	6	2	4	18	17	+1	20	2nd	SF			Allira Toby	5
2019–20	W−League	12	5	2	5	22	19	+3	17	5th	—	—	—	Hayley Raso	4
2020–21	W−League	12	7	4	1	29	12	+17	25	2nd	SF	—	—	Emily Gielnik	13♦

== Footnotes ==
a. Played the 2008−09 season known as Queensland Roar.
b. Was not invited to participate in the International Women's Club Championship for the years that the competition took place (2012−2014).
c. The 2015−16 season top scorers were Clare Polkinghorne, Gabe Marzano, Katrina Gorry, Kirsty Yallop, Tameka Butt, Ruth Blackburn and Emily Gielnik, each with 2 goals.
