= 2015–16 Brisbane Roar FC (women) season =

Brisbane Roar W-League
2015–16 season
- Manager: Belinda Wilson
- Stadium: Perry Park, Brisbane; Suncorp Stadium, Brisbane
- W-League: 4th
- W-League finals series: Semi-finals
- Top goalscorer: Clare Polkinghorne, Gabe Marzano, Katrina Gorry, Kirsty Yallop, Tameka Butt, Ruth Blackburn & Emily Gielnik (2 goals)
- Highest home attendance: N/A
- Lowest home attendance: N/A
Home colours	Away colours	Third colours

The 2015–16 Brisbane Roar season was the club's eighth season in the W-League. They were eliminated in the semi-finals by Melbourne City on 5–4 on penalties.

== Players ==
=== Squad information ===
Note: Flags indicate national team as defined under FIFA eligibility rules; some limited exceptions apply. Players may hold more than one non-FIFA nationality.

No.	Pos.	Nation	Player
1	GK	USA	Haley Kopmeyer
2	DF	AUS	Brooke Goodrich
3	FW	AUS	Amy Chapman
4	DF	AUS	Clare Polkinghorne (Captain)
6	DF	AUS	Angela Beard
7	FW	AUS	Gabe Marzano
8	MF	AUS	Ayesha Norrie
9	FW	AUS	Cortnee Vine
10	MF	AUS	Katrina Gorry
11	MF	AUS	Kirsty Yallop

No.	Pos.	Nation	Player
12	MF	AUS	Alisha Foote
13	MF	AUS	Tameka Butt
14	DF	AUS	Summer O'Brien
15	FW	AUS	Ruth Blackburn
16	MF	AUS	Ashley Spina
17	FW	AUS	Emily Gielnik
18	MF	AUS	Maili Forbes
19	FW	SWE	Sofie Persson
20	GK	AUS	Carrie Simpson
21		AUS	Elise Franco

=== Contract extensions ===
No.	Name	Position	Duration	Date	Note

== Managerial staff ==
Position	Name
Head coach	(Australia) Belinda Wilson
Assistant coach	
Team manager	

== Squad statistics ==
N	Pos.	Nat.	Name	Total					W-League					W-League finals series
N	Pos.	Nat.	Name	Apps	Goals	Yellow card	Second yellow card	Red card	Apps	Goals	Yellow card	Second yellow card	Red card	Apps	Goals	Yellow card	Second yellow card	Red card
1	GK	(United States)	Haley Kopmeyer	12	0	0	0	0	11+0	0	0	0	0	1+0	0	0	0	0
2	DF	(Australia)	Brooke Goodrich	1	0	0	0	0	0+1	0	0	0	0	0+0	0	0	0	0
3	FW	(Australia)	Amy Chapman	13	0	0	0	0	12+0	0	0	0	0	1+0	0	0	0	0
4	DF	(Australia)	Clare Polkinghorne	11	2	0	0	0	10+0	2	0	0	0	1+0	0	0	0	0
6	DF	(Australia)	Angela Beard	13	1	1	0	0	12+0	1	1	0	0	1+0	0	0	0	0
7	FW	(Australia)	Gabe Marzano	11	2	1	0	0	9+1	2	1	0	0	0+1	0	0	0	0
8	MF	(Australia)	Ayesha Norrie	11	0	0	0	0	5+5	0	0	0	0	1+0	0	0	0	0
9	FW	(Australia)	Cortnee Vine	6	0	0	0	0	0+6	0	0	0	0	0+0	0	0	0	0
10	MF	(Australia)	Katrina Gorry	10	2	4	0	0	10+0	2	4	0	0	0+0	0	0	0	0
11	MF	(Australia)	Kirsty Yallop	8	2	4	1	0	7+1	2	4	1	0	0+0	0	0	0	0
12	MF	(Australia)	Alisha Foote	12	0	0	0	0	5+6	0	0	0	0	1+0	0	0	0	0
13	MF	(Australia)	Tameka Butt	11	2	3	0	0	10+0	2	2	0	0	1+0	0	1	0	0
14	DF	(Australia)	Summer O'Brien	12	0	3	0	0	11+0	0	2	0	0	1+0	0	1	0	0
15	FW	(Australia)	Ruth Blackburn	12	2	2	0	1	11+0	2	2	0	1	1+0	0	0	0	0
16	MF	(Australia)	Ashley Spina	4	0	0	0	0	0+4	0	0	0	0	0+0	0	0	0	0
17	FW	(Australia)	Emily Gielnik	13	2	1	0	0	12+0	2	1	0	0	1+0	0	0	0	0
18	MF	(Australia)	Maili Forbes	7	0	2	0	0	2+4	0	2	0	0	0+1	0	0	0	0
19	FW	(Sweden)	Sofie Persson	7	0	0	0	0	2+5	0	0	0	0	0+0	0	0	0	0
20	GK	(Australia)	Carrie Simpson	0	0	0	0	0	0+0	0	0	0	0	0+0	0	0	0	0
21		(Australia)	Elise Franco	2	0	0	0	0	0+2	0	0	0	0	0+0	0	0	0	0

- Source: au.women.soccerway.com
- (yellow card) = Number of bookings; (second yellow card) = Number of sending offs after a second yellow card; (red card) = Number of sending offs by a direct red card.

== Competitions ==
=== W-League ===
==== League table ====
Pos	Team	Pld	W	D	L	GF	GA	GD	Pts	Qualification
1	Melbourne City (C)	12	12	0	0	38	4	+34	36	Qualification to Finals series
2	Canberra United	12	8	2	2	26	8	+18	26	Qualification to Finals series
3	Sydney FC	12	6	1	5	15	21	−6	19	Qualification to Finals series
4	Brisbane Roar	12	5	1	6	16	17	−1	16	Qualification to Finals series
5	Adelaide United	12	3	4	5	18	19	−1	13	
6	Newcastle Jets	12	3	4	5	9	12	−3	13	
7	Western Sydney Wanderers	12	3	3	6	15	25	−10	12	
8	Perth Glory	12	3	2	7	10	23	−13	11	
9	Melbourne Victory	12	2	1	9	10	28	−18	7	

Source: A-Leagues
Rules for classification: 1) points; 2) goal difference; 3) number of goals scored.
(C) Champions

==== Results summary ====
Overall								Home						Away					
Pld	W	D	L	GF	GA	GD	Pts	W	D	L	GF	GA	GD	W	D	L	GF	GA	GD
12	5	1	6	14	19	−5	16	2	0	4	7	10	−3	3	1	2	7	9	−2

Source: Competitive Matches

==== Results by round ====
Round	1	2	3	4	5	6	7	8	9	10	11	12	13	14
Ground	H	A	A	B	H	A	H	A	B	A	H	A	H	A
Result	W	W	L	✖	L	L	L	L	✖	W	L	W	W	D
Position	2	2	2	3	5	7	8	8	8	7	7	6	4	4

Source: Competitive Matches
A = Away; H = Home; B = Bye; W = Win; D = Draw; L = Loss

==== Matches ====
18 October 2015 1	Brisbane Roar	2–1	Canberra United	Brisbane
13:00 AEST	Butt 8'; Blackburn 11'	Report	Heyman 39'	Stadium: Suncorp Stadium; Referee: Kate Jacewicz

25 October 2015 2	Western Sydney Wanderers	0–3	Brisbane Roar	Sydney
15:00 AEDT		Report	Gielnik 64', 76' (pen.); Marzano 90+1'	Stadium: Marconi Stadium; Referee: Lara Smith

1 November 2015 3	Brisbane Roar	1–2	Adelaide United	Redland City
15:00 AEST	Gorry 22'	Report	Sutton 9'; Condon 51'	Stadium: Cleveland Showgrounds; Attendance: 1,010; Referee: Rachel Mitchenson

15 November 2015 5	Brisbane Roar	0–2	Perth Glory	Brisbane
13:00 AEST		Report	DiBernardo 8', 88'	Stadium: Suncorp Stadium; Referee: Katie Patterson

22 November 2015 6	Melbourne City	4–0	Brisbane Roar	Melbourne
14:00 AEDT	Little 54', 61'; Crummer 79', 81'	Report		Stadium: CB Smith Reserve; Referee: Kate Jacewicz

29 November 2015 7	Brisbane Roar	0–4	Newcastle Jets	Kippa-Ring
15:00 AEST		Report	Jones 22'; Dydasco 55'; Kingsley 75'; Oyster 83'	Stadium: A.J. Kelly Park; Referee: Rachel Mitchenson

5 December 2015 8	Canberra United	2–0	Brisbane Roar	Canberra
16:00 AEDT	Sykes 45', 60'	Report		Stadium: McKellar Park; Attendance: 925; Referee: Casey Reibelt

20 December 2015 10	Sydney FC	0–3	Brisbane Roar	Gosford
14:00 AEDT		Report	Butt 19'; Kennedy 38' (o.g.); Polkinghorne 63'	Stadium: Central Coast Stadium; Referee: Kate Jacewicz

28 December 2015 11	Brisbane Roar	0–1	Melbourne City	Gold Coast
14:30 AEST		Report	Little 6'	Stadium: Pizzey Park; Attendance: 1,672; Referee: Kelly Jones

3 January 2016 12	Adelaide United	1–3	Brisbane Roar	Adelaide
15:00 ACDT	Dahlkemper 90+4'	Report	Gielnik 26'; Yallop 40'; Marzano 41'	Stadium: Adelaide Shores Football Centre; Referee: Kate Jacewicz

10 January 2016 13	Brisbane Roar	4–0	Melbourne Victory	Gold Coast
15:00 AEDT	Polkinghorne 17'; Gorry 22'; Yallop 29'; A. Beard 90+3'	Report		Stadium: Pizzey Park; Attendance: 1,148; Referee: Casey Reibelt

17 January 2016 14	Newcastle Jets	0–0	Brisbane Roar	Newcastle
14:00 AEDT		Report		Stadium: Hunter Stadium; Referee: Kelly Jones

==== Finals series ====
25 January 2016 Semi-final	Melbourne City	0–0 (a.e.t.) (5–4 p)	Brisbane Roar	Melbourne
16:30 AEDT		Report		Stadium: AAMI Park; Attendance: 4,941; Referee: Rebecca Durcau
	Penalties
	Beattie (penalty scored); Alleway (penalty scored); Little (penalty scored); Catley (penalty scored); De Vanna (penalty scored)		(penalty scored) Polkinghorne; (penalty scored) Butt; (penalty scored) Gielnik; (penalty scored) Chapman; (penalty missed) A. Beard

== See also ==
- 2015–16 Brisbane Roar FC season
