= 2015–16 Perth Glory FC (women) season =

Perth Glory W-League
2015–16 season
- Chairman: Tony Sage
- Head coach: Bobby Despotovski; Collette McCallum (assistant)
- Stadium: Ashfield Reserve
- W-League: 8th
- Top goalscorer: Vanessa DiBernardo (6 goals)
Home colours

The 2015–16 Perth Glory FC W-League season was the club's eighth participation in the W-League, since the league's formation in 2008. The team finished eighth, though they were only two wins from competing in the finals series.

== Review and events ==
=== Background ===
In mid-2015, control of the club transferred from Football West to Perth Glory FC. On taking control, the club advertised the head coach role. Incumbent coach Jamie Harnwell declined to apply for his role. Bobby Despotovski was named as Harnwell's replacement in late July 2015. Sam Kerr was named captain of the team. The Glory returned to Ashfield Reserve for a second season.

=== Season ===
The Glory opened the season with a 2–1 win over the Melbourne Victory at Broadmeadows Valley Park. After conceding an early goal to the Victory, Caitlin Foord and Sam Kerr each scored a goal to take the points.

Caitlin Foord and Sam Kerr were missing from the Glory's second match lineup after being called up to the national team. Nikki Stanton on loan from Sky Blue FC in the National Women's Soccer League (NWSL) made her debut as the Glory and Jets played out a 0–0 draw at Ashfield Reserve.

Facing the undefeated Melbourne City, the Glory lost 4–0 at home, with former Glory players Marianna Tabain and Lisa De Vanna scoring goals for City.

American player Vanessa DiBernardo joined the Glory on a loan deal from NWSL team Chicago Red Stars in November 2015, scoring a double on debut in a 2–0 away victory over Brisbane Roar. There were injury concerns over Sam Kerr after she suffered an ankle injury and was replaced before half-time.

The 6 December match against Adelaide United was the first time that Jamie Harnwell, now in charge of the Reds, had faced his former team. The match was scheduled to be held at Hindmarsh Stadium and broadcast nationally as part of an A-League–W-League double-header. With a forecast temperature of 41 °C (106 °F), Football Federation Australia (FFA) initially moved the game from 1:30 pm ACDT (UTC+10:30) to 4:00 pm. With the players about to warm up, a switch of venues to Adelaide Shores Football Centre was announced, with the game kicking off at 7:30 pm. Shawn Billam opened the scoring for the Glory in the seventh minute, with Alex Gummer equalising for Adelaide in the 75th minute.

== Transfers ==
^{Note: Flags indicate national team as defined under FIFA eligibility rules. Players may hold more than one non-FIFA nationality.}

=== Transfers in ===
Player	Position	From	Ref.
(Australia) Kim Carroll	MF	(Australia) Brisbane Roar	
(Australia) Danielle Brogan	DF	(Australia) Adelaide United	
(Australia) Ella Mastrantonio	MF	(Australia) Melbourne Victory	
(England) Katie Holtham	MF	(Australia) Adelaide United	
(Australia) Carla Bennett	DF	Northern Redbacks (WA)	
(Australia) Caitlin Doeglas	MF	–	
(Australia) Ellie Lamonte	FW	NTC-U19 (WA)	

=== Transfers out ===
Player	Position	To	Ref.
(Canada) Shelina Zadorsky	DF	(Sweden) Vittsjö GIK	
(Australia) Collette McCallum	MF	retired	
(Australia) Alanna Kennedy	MF	(Australia) Sydney FC	
(Australia) Marianna Tabain	FW	(Australia) Melbourne City	
(Australia) Gabe Marzano	FW	(Australia) Brisbane Roar	
(Australia) Bronwyn Studman	DF	(Australia) Canberra FC	
(Australia) Katarina Jukic	FW	Beckenham Angels SC (WA)	-
(Australia) Kate Gill	FW	–	
(Wales) Carys Hawkins	DF	–	
(Australia) Elisa D'Ovidio	MF	retired	

=== Loans in ===
Player	Position	From	Ref.
(Australia) Sam Kerr	FW	(United States) Sky Blue FC (Note: Kerr returned to the Glory on loan after signing for Sky Blue FC ahead of the 2015 NWSL season)	
(Australia) Caitlin Foord	FW	(United States) Sky Blue FC (Note: Foord returned to the Glory on loan after spending three seasons with Sky Blue FC)	
(United States) Nikki Stanton	MF	(United States) Sky Blue FC	
(United States) Vanessa DiBernardo	MF	(United States) Chicago Red Stars	

== Competitions ==
=== W-League ===
==== League table ====
Pos	Team	Pld	W	D	L	GF	GA	GD	Pts	Qualification
1	Melbourne City (C)	12	12	0	0	38	4	+34	36	Qualification to Finals series
2	Canberra United	12	8	2	2	26	8	+18	26	Qualification to Finals series
3	Sydney FC	12	6	1	5	15	21	−6	19	Qualification to Finals series
4	Brisbane Roar	12	5	1	6	16	17	−1	16	Qualification to Finals series
5	Adelaide United	12	3	4	5	18	19	−1	13	
6	Newcastle Jets	12	3	4	5	9	12	−3	13	
7	Western Sydney Wanderers	12	3	3	6	15	25	−10	12	
8	Perth Glory	12	3	2	7	10	23	−13	11	
9	Melbourne Victory	12	2	1	9	10	28	−18	7	

Source: A-Leagues
Rules for classification: 1) points; 2) goal difference; 3) number of goals scored.
(C) Champions

== Matches ==
Win Draw Loss

Date	Opponent	Venue	Result	Scorers	Attendance	Referee	Refs
17 October 2015	Melbourne Victory	A	2–1	Foord, Kerr		Patterson	
24 October 2015	Newcastle Jets	H	0–0		714	Durcau	
31 October 2015	Melbourne City	H	0–4		483	Jones	
8 November 2015	Sydney FC	A	0–1			Jacewicz	
15 November 2015	Brisbane Roar	A	2–0	DiBernardo (2)		Patterson	
28 November 2015	Melbourne Victory	H	1–3	May		Reibelt	
6 November 2015	Adelaide United	A	1–1	Billam		Durcau	
13 December 2015	Sydney FC	H	2–4	DiBernardo (2)	458	Patterson	
20 December 2015	Melbourne City	A	0–4		450	Reibelt	
2 January 2016	Canberra United	H	0–2			Reibelt	
10 January 2016	Adelaide United	H	2–1	DiBernardo (2)		Lee	
17 January 2016	Western Sydney Wanderers	A	0–2			Jacewicz	

== Player statistics ==
No.	Pos	Nat	Player	Total		W-League	
No.	Pos	Nat	Player	Apps	Goals	Apps	Goals
1	GK	(Australia) AUS	Mackenzie Arnold	8	0	8	0
2	DF	(Australia) AUS	Sarah Carroll	5	0	5	0
3	DF	(Australia) AUS	Kim Carroll	12	0	12	0
4	DF	(England) ENG	Katie Holtham	10	0	10	0
5	MF	(Australia) AUS	Shannon May	12	0	12	0
6	DF	(Australia) AUS	Carla Bennett	11	1	11	1
7	MF	(United States) USA	Nikki Stanton	11	0	11	0
8	MF	(Australia) AUS	Shawn Billam	11	1	11	1
9	FW	(Australia) AUS	Caitlin Foord	7	1	7	1
11	MF	(Australia) AUS	Emily Henderson	9	0	9	0
12	FW	(Australia) AUS	Katie Schubert	8	0	8	0
13	DF	(Australia) AUS	Danielle Brogan	8	0	8	0
14	MF	(Australia) AUS	Caitlin Doeglas	9	0	9	0
15	DF	(Australia) AUS	Angelique Stannett	6	0	6	0
16	DF	(Australia) AUS	Thia Eastman	11	0	11	0
17	FW	(Australia) AUS	Ellie Lamonte	1	0	1	0
18	GK	(Australia) AUS	Gabby Dal Busco	4	0	4	0
19	MF	(Australia) AUS	Ella Mastrantonio	10	0	10	0
20	FW	(Australia) AUS	Sam Kerr (C)	4	1	4	1
22	GK	(Australia) AUS	Evangeline Gooch	0	0	0	0
23	MF	(United States) USA	Vanessa DiBernardo	8	6	8	6

Source: Soccerway

== See also ==
- 2015–16 Perth Glory FC season
