= 2015 AFF Women's Championship =

Tournament details
- Host country: Vietnam
- City: Ho Chi Minh City
- Dates: 1–10 May
- Teams: 8 (from 1 confederation)
- Venue: 1 (in 1 host city)

Final positions
- Champions: Thailand (2nd title)
- Runners-up: Myanmar
- Third place: Australia U20
- Fourth place: Vietnam

Tournament statistics
- Matches played: 16
- Goals scored: 80 (5 per match)
- Top scorer(s): (Thailand) Nisa Romyen (9 goals)

The 2015 AFF Women's Championship was the eighth edition of the AFF Women's Championship, an international women's football tournament organised by the ASEAN Football Federation (AFF). The tournament was held in Ho Chi Minh City, Vietnam, between 1 and 10 May 2015. Eight teams played in the tournament.

Thailand won the tournament for the second time after beating Myanmar 3–2 in the final.

== Venues ==
Ho Chi Minh City
Thống Nhất Stadium
Capacity: 25,000
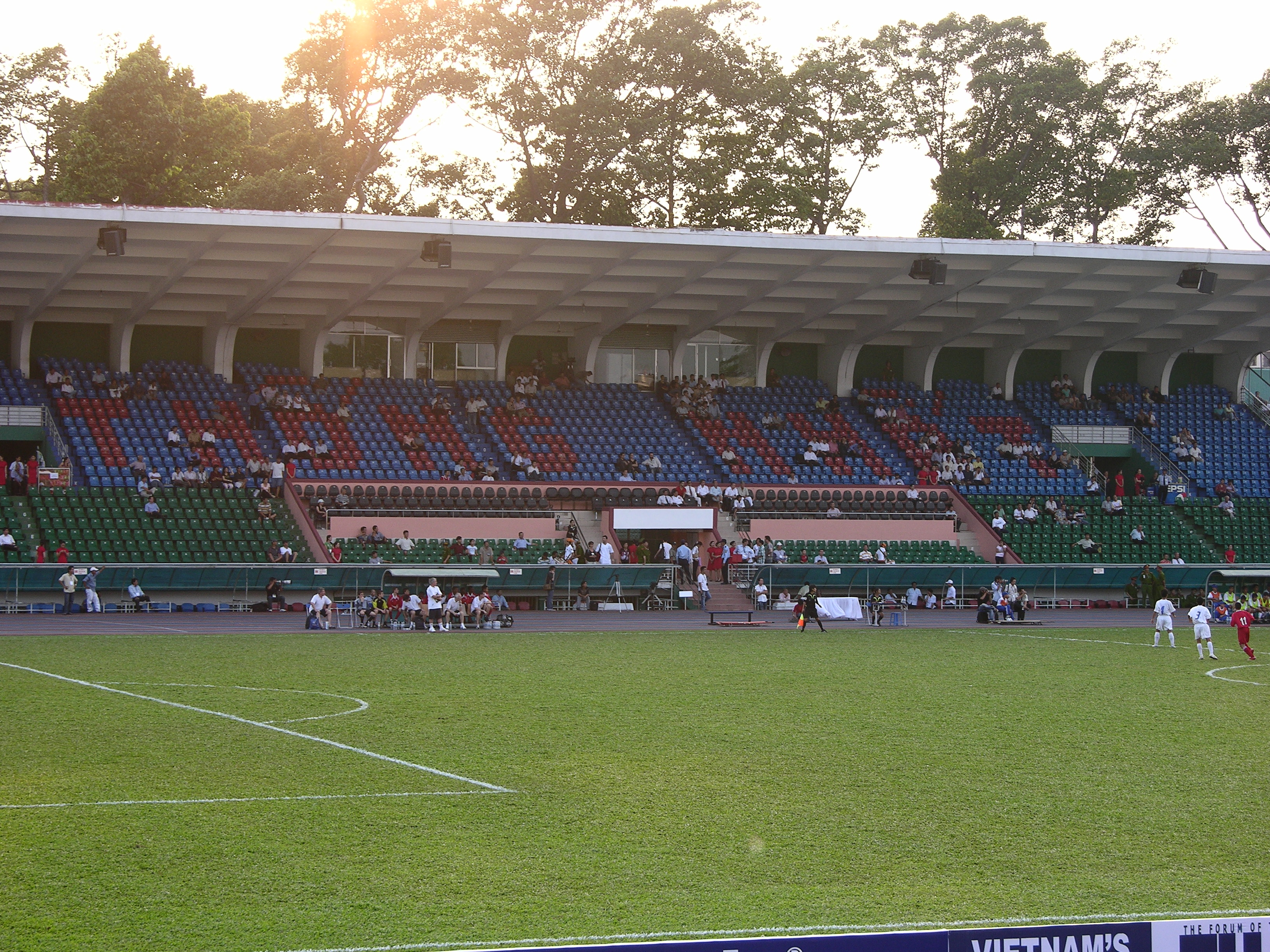

== Participating teams ==
The following 8 teams took part in the tournament at Ho Chi Minh City, Vietnam:

- Australia U20
- Indonesia
- Laos
- Thailand
- Myanmar
- Malaysia
- Philippines
- Vietnam (Hosts)

== Group stage ==
All times listed are Indochina Time (UTC+7)

=== Group A ===
Pos	Team	Pld	W	D	L	GF	GA	GD	Pts	Qualification
1	Australia U20	3	3	0	0	11	0	+11	9	Advances to the semi-finals
2	Thailand	3	2	0	1	22	4	+18	6	Advances to the semi-finals
3	Laos	3	1	0	2	2	13	−11	3	
4	Indonesia	3	0	0	3	1	19	−18	0	

Source: VFF
1 May 2015
16:00

Thailand	0–3	Australia U20
	Report	Harrison 53' (pen.); Goad 77'; Checker 83'

Thống Nhất Stadium, Ho Chi Minh City
Attendance: 10
Referee: Thein Thein Aye (Myanmar)
1 May 2015
18:30

Indonesia	0–2	Laos
	Report	Vannida 10'; Noum 47' (pen.)

Thống Nhất Stadium, Ho Chi Minh City
Attendance: 10
Referee: Patchaya Boonprasit (Thailand)

3 May 2015
16:00

Australia U20	1–0	Laos
Ferguson 59'	Report

Thống Nhất Stadium, Ho Chi Minh City
Attendance: 10
Referee: Seinn Cho Aung (Myanmar)
3 May 2015
18:30

Indonesia	1–10	Thailand
Erma 82'	Report	Nisa 5', 39', 45'; Anootsara 30', 37'; Pikul 53'; Wilaiporn 59'; Alisa 66'; Naphat 75'; Orathai 87'

Thống Nhất Stadium, Ho Chi Minh City
Attendance: 10
Referee: Thein Thein Aye (Myanmar)

5 May 2015
16:00

Laos	0–12	Thailand
	Report	Alisa 8', 28', 41', 65', 74'; Nisa 11', 15', 29'; Wilaiporn 34'; Orathai 70', 79'; Taneekarn 78'

Thống Nhất Stadium, Ho Chi Minh City
Attendance: 90
Referee: Seinn Cho Aung (Myanmar)
5 May 2015
18:30

Australia U20	7–0	Indonesia
Baker 9', 29'; Ibini 26'; Condon 32', 60'; Chidiac 42'; Price 56'	Report

Thống Nhất Stadium, Ho Chi Minh City
Attendance: 80
Referee: Mai Hoàng Trang (Vietnam)

=== Group B ===
Pos	Team	Pld	W	D	L	GF	GA	GD	Pts	Qualification
1	Vietnam (H)	3	3	0	0	14	2	+12	9	Advances to the semi-finals
2	Myanmar	3	2	0	1	10	4	+6	6	Advances to the semi-finals
3	Philippines	3	1	0	2	4	8	−4	3	
4	Malaysia	3	0	0	3	0	14	−14	0	

Source: VFF
(H) Hosts
2 May 2015
16:00

Malaysia	0–3	Philippines
	Report	Shugg 23'; Houplin 72', 75'

Thống Nhất Stadium, Ho Chi Minh City
Attendance: 10
Referee: Mai Hoàng Trang (Vietnam)
2 May 2015
18:30

Vietnam	3–2	Myanmar
Huỳnh Như 6', 84'; Nguyễn Thị Minh Nguyệt 30'	Report	Khin Moe Wai 13'; Naw Ar Lo Wer Phaw 23'

Thống Nhất Stadium, Ho Chi Minh City
Attendance: 200
Referee: Rita Ghani (Malaysia)

4 May 2015
16:00

Myanmar	4–1	Philippines
Naw Ar Lo Wer Phaw 50', 53', 74'; Khin Moe Wai 66'	Report	Houplin 21'

Thống Nhất Stadium, Ho Chi Minh City
Attendance: 130
Referee: Rita Ghani (Malaysia)
4 May 2015
18:30

Malaysia	0–7	Vietnam
	Report	Huỳnh Như 1', 62'; Trần Thị Hồng Nhung 47'; Nguyễn Thị Nguyệt 59'; Nguyễn Thị Tuyết Dung 78', 82', 90+1'

Thống Nhất Stadium, Ho Chi Minh City
Attendance: 1,200
Referee: Patchaya Boonprasit (Thailand)

6 May 2015
16:00

Myanmar	4–0	Malaysia
Win Theingi Tun 43', 46'; Yee Yee Oo 68', 74'	Report

Thống Nhất Stadium, Ho Chi Minh City
Attendance: 50
Referee: Patchaya Boonprasit (Thailand)
6 May 2015
18:30

Philippines	0–4	Vietnam
	Report	Nguyễn Thị Minh Nguyệt 3', 27', 38' (pen.); Trần Thị Thùy Trang 11'

Thống Nhất Stadium, Ho Chi Minh City
Attendance: 2,000
Referee: Rita Ghani (Malaysia)

== Knockout stage ==
Semi-finals
8 May 2015 – Ho Chi Minh City
Australia U20	0
Myanmar	1
8 May 2015 – Ho Chi Minh City
Vietnam	1
Thailand (a.e.t.)	2

Final
10 May 2015 – Ho Chi Minh City
Myanmar	2
Thailand	3
Third place
10 May 2015 – Ho Chi Minh City
Australia U20	4
Vietnam	3

=== Semi-finals ===
8 May 2015
16:00

Australia U20	0–1	Myanmar
	Report	Khin Moe Wai 51'

Thống Nhất Stadium, Ho Chi Minh City
Attendance: 300
Referee: Mai Hoàng Trang (Vietnam)
8 May 2015
19:30

Vietnam	1–2 (a.e.t.)	Thailand
Nguyễn Thị Liễu 30'	Report	Nisa 52', 92'

Thống Nhất Stadium, Ho Chi Minh City
Attendance: 13,000
Referee: Thein Thein Aye (Myanmar)

=== Third place match ===
10 May 2015
16:00

Australia U20	4–3	Vietnam
Ferguson 4'; Ibini 56', 90+1'; Goad 73'	Report	Nguyễn Thị Minh Nguyệt 11' (pen.), 31'; Nguyễn Thị Tuyết Dung 84'

Thống Nhất Stadium, Ho Chi Minh City
Attendance: 800
Referee: Patchaya Boonprasit (Thailand)

=== Final ===
10 May 2015
19:00

Myanmar	2–3	Thailand
Khin Moe Wai 55'; Win Theingi Tun 75'	Report	Kanjana 36'; Nisa 65'; Rattikan 71'

Thống Nhất Stadium, Ho Chi Minh City
Attendance: 600
Referee: Mai Hoàng Trang (Vietnam)

== Awards ==
2015 AFF Women's Championship Champions
(Thailand)
Thailand
Second title

== Goalscorers ==
9 goals

- (Thailand) Nisa Romyen

6 goals

- (Thailand) Alisa Rukpinij
- (Vietnam) Nguyễn Thị Minh Nguyệt

4 goals

- (Myanmar) Khin Moe Wai
- (Myanmar) Naw Ar Lo Wer Phaw
- (Vietnam) Nguyễn Thị Tuyết Dung
- (Vietnam) Huỳnh Như

3 goals

- (Australia) Princess Ibini
- (Myanmar) Win Theingi Tun
- (Philippines) Joana Houplin
- (Thailand) Orathai Srimanee

2 goals

- (Australia) Beattie Goad
- (Australia) Emily Condon
- (Australia) Jordan Baker
- (Australia) Kobie Ferguson
- (Myanmar) Yee Yee Oo
- (Thailand) Anootsara Maijarern
- (Thailand) Wilaiporn Boothduang

1 goal

- (Australia) Alexandra Chidiac
- (Australia) Amy Harrison
- (Australia) Emma Checker
- (Australia) Olivia Price
- (Indonesia) Erma Karafir
- (Laos) Noum Angmansongsa
- (Laos) Vannida Soukpanhya
- (Philippines) Jesse Shugg
- (Thailand) Kanjana Sungngoen
- (Thailand) Naphat Seesraum
- (Thailand) Pikul Khueanpet
- (Thailand) Rattikan Thongsombut
- (Thailand) Taneekarn Dangda
- (Vietnam) Nguyễn Thị Nguyệt
- (Vietnam) Nguyễn Thị Liễu
- (Vietnam) Trần Thị Hồng Nhung
- (Vietnam) Trần Thị Thùy Trang

== Final ranking ==
Pos	Team	Pld	W	D	L	GF	GA	GD	Pts	Final result
1	Thailand	5	4	0	1	27	7	+20	12	Champions
2	Myanmar	5	3	0	2	13	7	+6	9	Runners-up
3	Australia U20	5	4	0	1	15	4	+11	12	Third place
4	Vietnam (H)	5	3	0	2	18	8	+10	9	Fourth place
5	Philippines	3	1	0	2	4	8	−4	3	Eliminated in group stage
6	Laos	3	1	0	2	2	13	−11	3	Eliminated in group stage
7	Malaysia	3	0	0	3	0	14	−14	0	Eliminated in group stage
8	Indonesia	3	0	0	3	1	19	−18	0	Eliminated in group stage

(H) Hosts
