= Emily Henderson =

Emily Henderson may refer to:

- Emily Henderson (politician) - New Zealand lawyer and politician, born 1972
- Emily Henderson (soccer) - Australian soccer player, born 1997
