= Jesse Shugg =

Filipino footballer

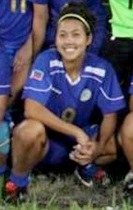
- Shugg in 2013

Personal information
- Full name: Jesse Anne Villanueva Shugg
- Date of birth: May 2, 1992 (age 34)
- Place of birth: Burlington, Ontario, Canada
- Height: 1.68 m (5 ft 6 in)
- Position: Forward

Youth career
- Burlington YSC

College career
Years	Team	Apps	(Gls)
2010–2011	Florida Atlantic Owls	34	(15)
2012–2013	Miami Hurricanes	33	(1)

Senior career*
Years	Team	Apps	(Gls)
2011	Toronto Lady Lynx		
2012	Hamilton FC Rage		
2014	K-W United FC		
2016	Tindastóll	7	(11)
2017	Fylkir	10	(1)
2022	Blue Devils FC	6	(0)

International career
2013–2018	Philippines	12	(4)

Managerial career
- PBA Sailfish (assistant)
- * Club domestic league appearances and goals as of 17 July 2022

Jesse Anne Villanueva Shugg (born May 2, 1992) is a footballer who plays as a forward. Born in Canada, she represents the Philippines national team.

== Early life ==
She played youth soccer with the Burlington Youth SC. In 2009, she won the Golden Boot award at the Canadian youth national championship.

== College career ==
In 2010, she committed to attend Florida Atlantic University, where she would play for the women's soccer team. She scored her first goal on September 10, 2010, against the North Dakota State Bison. In her sophomore season, she served as team captain. She led FAU in goals and points during both her seasons.

In 2012, she transferred to the University of Miami to play for the women's soccer team. She scored her first goal on August 17, 2012, against the Florida Gators.

== Club career ==
In 2011, she played with the Toronto Lady Lynx in the USL W-League.

In 2012, she played with Hamilton FC Rage and then played with them again in 2014, after they relocated and became K-W United FC.

In 2016, Shugg was signed to play for UMF Tindastóll of the Icelandic second-tier 1. deild kvenna. On July 20, she scored a hat trick against Fjarðab/Höttur/Leiknir. With Tindastóll, she scored 11 goals in 7 games.

In November 2016, Shugg was signed with Fylkir of the Úrvalsdeild kvenna for the 2017 season.

In 2022, she played with Blue Devils FC in League1 Ontario.

== International career ==
In 2009, Shugg attended a camp with the Canadian U-20 national team.

In 2012, she attended a camp in California, where the national team coach was looking at players of Filipino descent in North America, which was immediately followed by the 2012 LA Vikings Cup tournament against American club teams, where the Philippines won the tournament and she scored five goals in an 8–1 win against club side Leon.

She made her official international debut on May 21, 2013, at the 2014 AFC Women's Asian Cup qualifiers against Iran, where she scored two goals in a 6–0 victory. She later represented the team at the 2013 South East Asian Games, 2015 AFF Women's Championship, and 2018 AFC Women's Asian Cup

=== International goals ===
Scores and results list the Philippines' goal tally first.

#	Date	Venue	Opponent	Score	Result	Competition
1.	May 21, 2013	Bangabandhu National Stadium, Dhaka	Iran	3–0	6–0	2014 AFC Women's Asian Cup qualification
2.	May 21, 2013	Bangabandhu National Stadium, Dhaka	Iran	6–0	6–0	2014 AFC Women's Asian Cup qualification
3.	May 2, 2015	Thống Nhất Stadium, Ho Chi Minh City	Malaysia	1–0	3–0	2015 AFF Women's Championship
4.	April 12, 2018	King Abdullah II Stadium, Amman	Thailand	1–3	1–3	2018 AFC Women's Asian Cup

== Coaching career ==
Shugg worked with the PBA Sailfish women's soccer team as an assistant coach in 2014.
