= Brooke Miller (soccer) =

Australian soccer player

Personal information
- Full name: Brooke Miller
- Date of birth: 4 May 1998 (age 28)
- Place of birth: Australia
- Position: Centreback

Senior career*
Years	Team	Apps	(Gls)
2014–2017	Newcastle Jets	11	(0)

International career^{‡}
2014	Australia U-17		
2014–	Australia U-20	3	(0)
- * Club domestic league appearances and goals as of 5 March 2017 ‡ National team caps and goals as of 2 August 2016

Brooke Miller (born 4 May 1998) is an Australian soccer player, who played for Newcastle Jets in the Australian W-League.

== Playing career ==
=== Club ===
==== Newscastle Jets, 2015– ====
Miller signed with Newcastle Jets in 2014. She made her debut for the team during a match against Western Sydney Wanderers on 19 October 2014. Newcastle finished in fifth place with a 5–5–2 record. Returning in the 2015–16 W-League season, Miller made four appearances for Newcastle and helped the team finish in sixth place with a 3–5–4 record.

In December 2016, it was announced she would return to the Jets for the 2016–17 W-League season.

=== International ===
Miller has represented Australia on the under-17 and under-20 national teams.
