= Angela Beard =

Filipino footballer (born 1997)

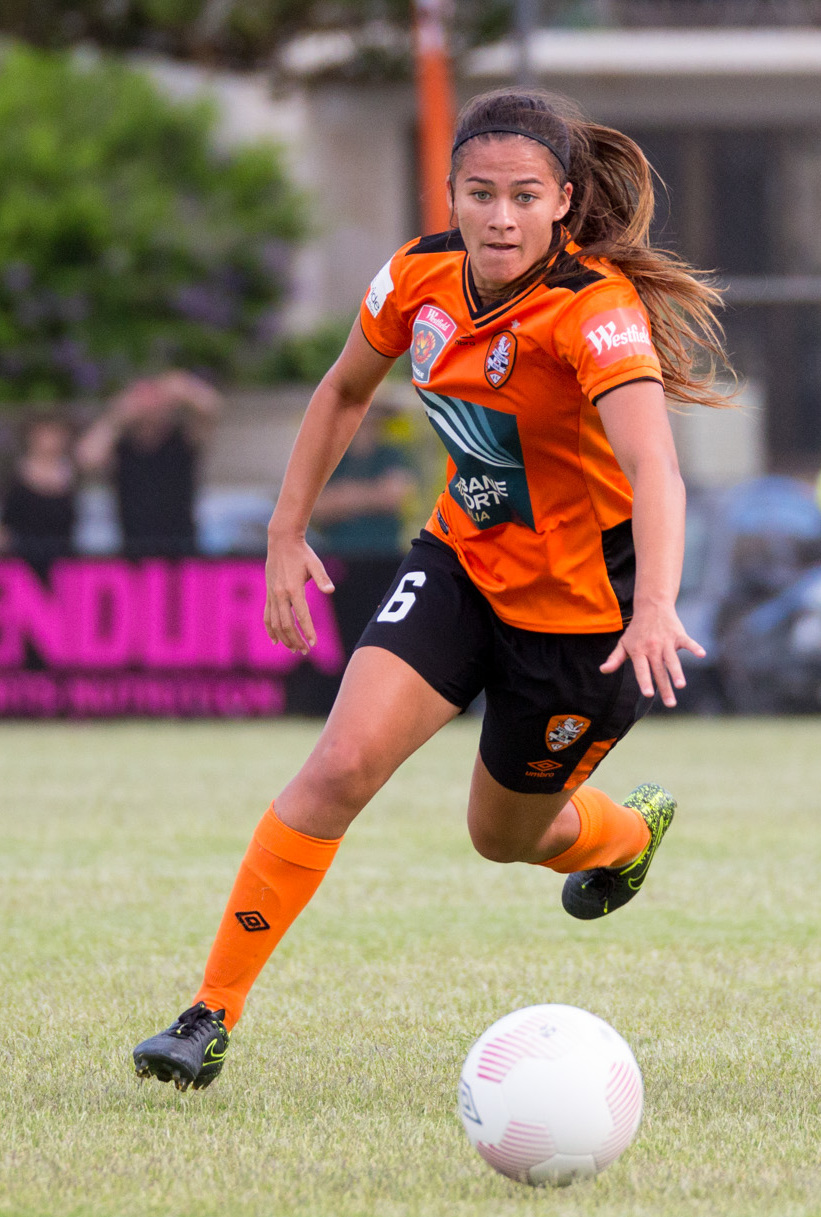
- Beard with Brisbane Roar in 2015

Personal information
- Full name: Angela Rachael Lopez Beard
- Date of birth: 16 August 1997 (age 29)
- Place of birth: Meadowbrook, Queensland, Australia
- Height: 5 ft 4 in (1.62 m)
- Position: Defender

Team information
- Current team: Melbourne Victory
- Number: 13

Senior career*
Years	Team	Apps	(Gls)
2014–2017	Brisbane Roar	29	(1)
2017–2020	Melbourne Victory	37	(0)
2020	KR	10	(1)
2020–2021	Melbourne Victory	13	(1)
2021–2023	Fortuna Hjørring	38	(3)
2023	Western United	12	(0)
2023–2024	Linköping	24	(0)
2025	AIK	10	(0)
2026	Brisbane Roar	2	(0)
2026–	Melbourne Victory	0	(0)

International career^{‡}
- Australia U-17
- Australia U-20
2021	Australia	3	(0)
2023–	Philippines	30	(2)
Medal record
Women's football
Representing the Philippines
Southeast Asian Games
Gold medal – first place	2025 Thailand	Team
- * Club domestic league appearances and goals as of 22 February 2026 ‡ National team caps and goals as of 19 March 2026

Angela Rachael Lopez Beard (Filipino: [ˈlopes]; born 16 August 1997) is a professional footballer who plays as a defender for A-League Women club Melbourne Victory. Born in Australia, she plays for the Philippines national team.

She has previously played for Brisbane Roar, Melbourne Victory and Western United in the Australian A-League Women, for KR in the Icelandic Úrvalsdeild kvenna, for Fortuna Hjørring in the Danish Women's League, and for Linköping FC and AIK Stockholm in the Swedish Damallsvenskan.

She has initially represented the Australia women's national under-17 soccer team and U-20 youth level teams as well as the senior level three times, before switching her allegiance to the Philippines.

== Club career ==
=== Brisbane Roar ===
Beard made her debut for Brisbane Roar on 14 September 2014 in a match against Perth Glory. She made five appearances for the team during the 2014–15 W-League season. The Roar finished in sixth place during the regular season with a 4–6–2 record.

Returning to the Roar for the 2015–16 W-League season, Beard helped the team finish in fourth place during the regular season securing a berth to the playoffs. During a match against Melbourne Victory on 9 January, Beard scored a goal in the third minute of stoppage time lifting the final score to 4–0. During the semifinal match against regular season champions Melbourne City, the Roar was defeated 5–4 in a penalty shootout after 120 minutes of regular and overtime produced no goals for either side.

Beard was named the November 2015 nominee for the 2015/16 W-League Young Footballer of the Year award. Of the nomination, she said, "This is only my second season in the Westfield W-League and I feel very privileged to be recognised at this early stage of my career." Following her performance in the 2016 W-League semifinal against Melbourne City, team captain and Matilda Clare Polkinghorne said, "she's got a really bright career ahead of her. She's only 18 years old, she's going to be a real force in Australian football." She was later named the Women's Player of the Year by the club.

=== Melbourne Victory ===
On 19 September 2017, Beard joined Melbourne Victory on a one-year deal, re-joining coach Jeff Hopkins. Beard has since re-signed for Melbourne Victory on a two-year deal.

=== Fortuna Hjørring ===
In June 2021, Beard sealed a move to Danish club Fortuna Hjørring, joining Australians Indiah-Paige Riley, Alexandra Huynh, and Clare Wheeler.

=== Western United ===
In January 2023, Beard returned to Australia joining A-League Women expansion club Western United on a two-year deal.

=== Linköping ===
In August 2023, Beard went overseas again, joining Swedish club Linköping.

=== Return to Brisbane Roar ===
In February 2026, Beard returned to Brisbane Roar, signing with the club until the end of the 2025–26 A-League Women season.

=== Return to Melbourne Victory ===
In September 2026, Beard returned to Melbourne Victory.

== International career ==
=== Australia ===
Beard has represented Australia on the under-17 and under-20 national teams. In January 2016, she was called up to training camp for the senior national team. In September 2021, Beard made her senior debut in a friendly against the Republic of Ireland.

=== Philippines ===
Beard is eligible to represent the Philippines through her mother, who is from Cebu. On 2 October 2022, Beard was invited to the training camp of the Philippines prior to the team's friendlies against Costa Rica. In June 2023, Beard was named in the 29-player provisional squad for the 2023 FIFA Women's World Cup. She scored her first goal for the Philippines in a friendly against South Korea on 8 April 2024 which ended in a 1–2 defeat for her team.

== Career statistics ==
=== Club ===
As of 22 February 2026

Club	Season	League			Cup (Note: Includes Icelandic Women's Football Cup, Danish Women's Cup, Svenska cupen)		Continental (Note: Appearances in UEFA Women's Champions League)		Total	
Club	Season	Division	Apps	Goals	Apps	Goals	Apps	Goals	Apps	Goals
Brisbane Roar	2014–15	W-League	5	0	—		—		5	0
Brisbane Roar	2015–16	W-League	13	1	—		—		13	1
Brisbane Roar	2016–17	W-League	11	0	—		—		11	0
Brisbane Roar	Total		29	1	0	0	0	0	29	1
Melbourne Victory	2017–18	W-League	12	0	—		—		12	0
Melbourne Victory	2018–19	W-League	12	0	—		—		12	0
Melbourne Victory	2019–20	W-League	13	0	—		—		13	0
Melbourne Victory	Total		37	0	0	0	0	0	37	0
KR Reykjavik	2020	Úrvalsdeild kvenna	10	1	1	0	—		11	1
Melbourne Victory	2020–21	W-League	14	1	—		—		14	1
Fortuna Hjørring	2021–22	Elitedivisionen	24	3	4	0	—		28	3
Fortuna Hjørring	2022–23	Elitedivisionen	14	0	1	0	2	0	17	0
Fortuna Hjørring	Total		38	3	5	0	2	0	45	3
Western United	2022–23	A-League	12	0	—		—		12	0
Linköping	2023	Damallsvenskan	7	0	0	0	2	0	9	0
Linköping	2024	Damallsvenskan	17	0	3	0	2	1	22	1
Linköping	Total		24	0	3	0	4	1	31	1
AIK	2025	Damallsvenskan	10	0	3	0	—		13	0
Brisbane Roar	2025–26	A-League	2	0	0	0	0	0	2	0
Career total			176	6	12	0	6	1	194	7

=== International ===
As of match played 19 March 2026

Appearances and goals by national team and year
National team	Year	Apps	Goals
Australia	2021	3	0
Australia	Total	3	0
Philippines	2023	6	0
Philippines	2024	7	1
Philippines	2025	12	0
Philippines	2026	5	1
Philippines	Total	30	2
Career total		33	2

Scores and results list Philippine's goal tally first, score column indicates score after each Beard goal.

List of international goals scored by Angela Beard
No.	Date	Venue	Opponent	Score	Result	Competition	Ref.
1	8 April 2024	Icheon City Stadium, Icheon, South Korea	South Korea	1–2	1–2	Friendly	
2	19 March 2026	Gold Coast Stadium, Gold Coast, Australia	Uzbekistan	1–0	2–0	2026 AFC Women's Asian Cup	

== Personal life ==
Beard was born in Meadowbrook, Queensland, Australia, to an Australian father and a Filipina mother from Cebu, Philippines.

Beard is a part of the LGBTQ community and has spoken about struggling on dealing with her sexuality in her high school years.

== Honours ==
Brisbane Roar

- Westfield W-League, NAB Young Footballer of the Year nominee: 2015/16
- Player of the Year 2015/16
- Player's Player 2015/16

Melbourne Victory

- W-League Championship: 2020–21

Fortuna Hjørring

- Danish Women's League runner-up: 2021–22
- Danish Women's Cup: 2022

Western United

- A-League Women Championship runner-up: 2022–23

Philippines

- Southeast Asian Games: 2025
