= Kaitlyn Savage =

American professional soccer player (born 1990)

Personal information
- Full name: Kaitlyn Marie Savage
- Date of birth: October 27, 1990 (age 36)
- Place of birth: Fox Island, Washington, United States
- Height: 5 ft 10 in (1.78 m)
- Position: Goalkeeper

Team information
- Current team: Orlando Pride
- Number: 25

College career
Years	Team	Apps	(Gls)
2009–2012	FIU Panthers	63	(0)

Senior career*
Years	Team	Apps	(Gls)
2013	Perth Glory	3	(0)
2013	Þór/KA		
2014–2016	Glenfield Rovers		
2015–2016	Adelaide United	12	(0)
2016	Orlando Pride	4	(0)
- * Club domestic league appearances and goals as of October 5, 2016

Kaitlyn Marie Savage (born October 27, 1990) is an American professional soccer player who last played for Orlando Pride in the National Women's Soccer League.

== Playing career ==
Savage joined Perth Glory in January 2013 following an injury to Carly Telford.

Savage represented Adelaide United in the 2015–16 W-League and won the Goalkeeper of the Year award.

In July 2016, Savage joined Orlando Pride to play in the National Women's Soccer League. She made her debut just three days after joining the team from Glenfield Rovers in New Zealand. Standing in for regular goalkeeper Ashlyn Harris, Savage played a full match in a 2–1 win over Boston Breakers.

== Honors ==
Individual

- W-League Goalkeeper of the Year: 2015–16

== See also ==
- List of foreign A-League Women players
