= 2015–16 W-League =

Eighth season of the top women's football (soccer) league in Australia

W-League
- Season: 2015–16
- Champions: Melbourne City (1st title)
- Premiers: Melbourne City (1st title)
- Matches: 57
- Goals: 163 (2.86 per match)
- Top goalscorer: Larissa Crummer (11 goals)
- Biggest home win: Melbourne City 4–0 Brisbane Roar (22 November 2015); Canberra United 4–0 Adelaide United (12 December 2015); Melbourne City 4–0 Perth Glory (20 December 2015); Melbourne City 4–0 Western Sydney Wanderers (3 January 2016); Brisbane Roar 4–0 Melbourne Victory (10 January 2016)
- Biggest away win: Sydney FC 0–6 Melbourne City (18 October 2015)
- Highest scoring: Sydney FC 0–6 Melbourne City (18 October 2015); Canberra United 2–4 Melbourne City (8 November 2015); Newcastle Jets 1–5 Adelaide United (19 December 2015)
- Longest winning run: Melbourne City (12 games)
- Longest unbeaten run: Melbourne City (14 games)
- Longest winless run: Western Sydney Wanderers (6 games)
- Longest losing run: Brisbane Roar, Melbourne Victory (5 games)
- All statistics correct as of 31 January 2016.

The 2015–16 W-League season was the eighth season of the W-League, the Australian national women's association football competition. On 13 May 2015, it was confirmed that Melbourne City would join the league for the 2015–16 season.

League newcomers Melbourne City claimed both the regular season Premiership and end of season Championship, the latter awarded for their victory in the 2016 W-League grand final.

== Clubs ==
=== Stadia and locations ===
Team	Location	Stadium	Capacity
Adelaide United	Adelaide	Adelaide Shores Football Centre; Coopers Stadium	1,000; 16,500
Brisbane Roar	Brisbane	Perry Park; Suncorp Stadium	5,000; 52,500
Canberra United	Canberra	McKellar Park	3,500
Melbourne City	Melbourne	CB Smith Reserve; AAMI Park	2,000; 30,050
Melbourne Victory	Melbourne	Epping Stadium; John Ilhan Memorial Reserve; AAMI Park; David Barro Stadium	10,000; 5,000; 30,050; 3,000
Newcastle Jets	Newcastle	Magic Park; Hunter Stadium	3,500; 33,000
Perth Glory	Perth	Ashfield Reserve	2,000
Sydney FC	Sydney	Lambert Park	7,000
Western Sydney Wanderers	Sydney	Marconi Stadium; Popondetta Park	11,500; 2,500

=== Personnel and kits ===
Team	Manager	Captain	Kit manufacturer	Kit sponsor
Adelaide United	(Australia) Jamie Harnwell	(Australia) Marijana Rajcic		
Brisbane Roar	(Australia) Belinda Wilson	(Australia) Clare Polkinghorne	Umbro	
Canberra United	(Australia) Rae Dower	(Australia) Nicole Begg		University of Canberra
Melbourne City	(Australia) Joe Montemurro	(Australia) Lisa De Vanna		
Melbourne Victory	(England) Dave Edmondson	(Australia) Melissa Barbieri	Adidas	
Newcastle Jets	(Australia) Craig Deans	(Australia) Tara Andrews		
Perth Glory	(Australia) Bobby Despotovski	(Australia) Sam Kerr	Macron	
Sydney FC	(Australia) Daniel Barrett	(Australia) Teresa Polias		Beechwood Holmes
Western Sydney Wanderers	(Australia) Norm Boardman	(Australia) Caitlin Cooper	Nike	

=== Foreign players ===
Club	Visa 1	Visa 2	Visa 3	Visa 4	Non-Visa foreigner(s)	Former player(s)
Adelaide United	(New Zealand) Elizabeth Milne	(United States) Abby Dahlkemper	(United States) Sarah Killion	(United States) Kaitlyn Savage		
Brisbane Roar	(England) Carrie Simpson	(Sweden) Sofie Persson	(United States) Haley Kopmeyer			
Canberra United	(Mexico) Verónica Pérez	(New Zealand) Emma Kete	(United States) Kendall Fletcher			(England) Jodie Taylor
Melbourne City	(Mexico) Anisa Guajardo	(Wales) Jess Fishlock	(Scotland) Jen Beattie	(Scotland) Kim Little	(New Zealand) Rebekah Stott^{A}	
Melbourne Victory	(New Zealand) Briar Palmer	(United States) Christine Nairn	(United States) Jamie Pollock		(Turkey) Gülcan Koca^{A}	(England) Natasha Dowie^{G} (United States) Georgia Cloepfil (United States) Brooke Elby^{G}
Newcastle Jets	(New Zealand) Hannah Bromley	(United States) Caprice Dydasco	(United States) Megan Oyster			
Perth Glory	(England) Katie Holtham	(United States) Vanessa DiBernardo	(United States) Nikki Stanton			
Sydney FC	(United States) Michelle Betos	(United States) Jasmyne Spencer				
Western Sydney Wanderers	(Canada) Carmelina Moscato	(England) Hannah Beard	(United States) Kendall Johnson	(United States) Keelin Winters		

The following do not fill a Visa position:
^{A} Australian citizens who have chosen to represent another national team;
^{G} Guest Players

== Regular season ==
The W-League 2015–16 fixture was released on 8 September 2015. The regular season commenced on 17 October 2015, and concluded on 17 January 2016.

=== League table ===
Pos	Team	Pld	W	D	L	GF	GA	GD	Pts	Qualification
1	Melbourne City (C)	12	12	0	0	38	4	+34	36	Qualification to Finals series
2	Canberra United	12	8	2	2	26	8	+18	26	Qualification to Finals series
3	Sydney FC	12	6	1	5	15	21	−6	19	Qualification to Finals series
4	Brisbane Roar	12	5	1	6	16	17	−1	16	Qualification to Finals series
5	Adelaide United	12	3	4	5	18	19	−1	13	
6	Newcastle Jets	12	3	4	5	9	12	−3	13	
7	Western Sydney Wanderers	12	3	3	6	15	25	−10	12	
8	Perth Glory	12	3	2	7	10	23	−13	11	
9	Melbourne Victory	12	2	1	9	10	28	−18	7	

Source: A-Leagues
Rules for classification: 1) points; 2) goal difference; 3) number of goals scored.
(C) Champions

=== Home and away season ===
In the 2015–16 season each team played 12 games with 2 bye rounds, kicking off on 17 October 2015, and concluding on 17 January 2016.

==== Round 1 ====
17 October 2015	Melbourne Victory	1–2	Perth Glory	Melbourne
15:00 AEDT	Spiranovic 8'	Report	Foord 45'; Kerr 69'	Stadium: ABD Stadium; Referee: Katie Patterson

17 October 2015	Adelaide United	2–2	Western Sydney Wanderers	Adelaide
15:00 ACDT	Killion 41'; Powell 62'	Report	Winters 3'; Cooper 17'	Stadium: Adelaide Shores Football Centre; Attendance: 602; Referee: Casey Reibelt

18 October 2015	Brisbane Roar	2–1	Canberra United	Brisbane
13:00 AEST	Butt 8'; Blackburn 11'	Report	Heyman 39'	Stadium: Suncorp Stadium; Referee: Kate Jacewicz

18 October 2015	Sydney FC	0–6	Melbourne City	Sydney
17:30 AEDT		Report	Crummer 11', 45'; De Vanna 39'; Goad 43'; Tabain 61'; Ayres 89'	Stadium: Lambert Park; Attendance: 960; Referee: Rebecca Durcau

==== Round 2 ====
24 October 2015	Canberra United	3–0	Sydney FC	Canberra
16:00 AEDT	Begg 9'; Pérez 58'; Munoz 68'	Report		Stadium: McKellar Park; Attendance: 1,009; Referee: Rachel Mitchinson

24 October 2015	Perth Glory	0–0	Newcastle Jets	Perth
16:00 AWST		Report		Stadium: Ashfield Reserve; Attendance: 714; Referee: Rebecca Durcau

25 October 2015	Melbourne City	2–1	Melbourne Victory	Melbourne
14:00 AEDT	Tabain 48'; Luik 72' (pen.)	Report	Knight 90+2'	Stadium: AAMI Park; Attendance: 2,311; Referee: Casey Reibelt

25 October 2015	Western Sydney Wanderers	0–3	Brisbane Roar	Sydney
15:00 AEDT		Report	Gielnik 64', 76' (pen.); Marzano 90+1'	Stadium: Marconi Stadium; Referee: Lara Smith

==== Round 3 ====
31 October 2015	Melbourne Victory	0–1	Newcastle Jets	Melbourne
15:00 AEDT		Report	Logarzo 45+2'	Stadium: John Ilhan Memorial Reserve; Referee: Kate Jacewicz

31 October 2015	Perth Glory	0–4	Melbourne City	Perth
16:00 AWST		Report	Tabain 12'; De Vanna 21'; Crummer 52', 64'	Stadium: Ashfield Reserve; Attendance: 483; Referee: Kelly Jones

1 November 2015	Western Sydney Wanderers	1–2	Sydney FC	Sydney
14:00 AEDT	Grey 82'	Report	L. Khamis 3', 35'	Stadium: Pirtek Stadium; Attendance: 2,448; Referee: Rebecca Durcau

1 November 2015	Brisbane Roar	1–2	Adelaide United	Redland City
15:00 AEST	Gorry 22'	Report	Sutton 9'; Condon 51'	Stadium: Cleveland Showgrounds; Attendance: 1,010; Referee: Rachel Mitchenson

==== Round 4 ====
7 November 2015	Newcastle Jets	1–2	Western Sydney Wanderers	Newcastle
14:00 AEDT	Kingsley 3'	Report	O'Brien 54'; Moscato 90+2'	Stadium: Magic Park; Referee: Kelly Jones

8 November 2015	Canberra United	2–4	Melbourne City	Gosford
14:00 AEDT	Sykes 29'; Heyman 60'	Report	Tabain 5'; Crummer 11'; Luik 41'; Little 87'	Stadium: Central Coast Stadium; Attendance: 1,233; Referee: Lara Lee

8 November 2015	Melbourne Victory	0–4	Adelaide United	Melbourne
15:00 AEDT		Report	Sutton 13', 55', 68' (pen.); Powell 33'	Stadium: Epping Stadium; Referee: Katie Patterson

8 November 2015	Sydney FC	1–0	Perth Glory	Sydney
16:00 AEDT	K. Simon 14' (pen.)	Report		Stadium: Lambert Park; Referee: Kate Jacewicz

==== Round 5 ====
14 November 2015	Newcastle Jets	0–0	Canberra United	Newcastle
14:00 AEDT		Report		Stadium: Magic Park; Referee: Kate Jacewicz

14 November 2015	Melbourne City	2–0	Adelaide United	Melbourne
16:00 AEDT	Crummer 43'; Fishlock 71'	Report		Stadium: CB Smith Reserve; Referee: Rebecca Durcau

15 November 2015	Brisbane Roar	0–2	Perth Glory	Brisbane
13:00 AEST		Report	DiBernardo 8', 88'	Stadium: Suncorp Stadium; Referee: Katie Patterson

15 November 2015	Western Sydney Wanderers	3–1	Melbourne Victory	Sydney
15:00 AEDT	Carney 24'; Dimovski 56' (o.g.); Winters 70' (pen.)	Report	Spiranovic 75'	Stadium: Marconi Stadium; Referee: Lara Lee

==== Round 6 ====
22 November 2015	Adelaide United	1–1	Newcastle Jets	Adelaide
13:30 ACDT	Powell 60'	Report	Andrews 83'	Stadium: Coopers Stadium; Referee: Kelly Jones

22 November 2015	Melbourne City	4–0	Brisbane Roar	Melbourne
14:00 AEDT	Little 54', 61'; Crummer 79', 81'	Report		Stadium: CB Smith Reserve; Referee: Kate Jacewicz

22 November 2015	Sydney FC	0–1	Canberra United	Sydney
17:30 AEDT		Report	Begg 88'	Stadium: Lambert Park (Leichhardt); Referee: Casey Reibelt

==== Round 7 ====
27 November 2015	Adelaide United	0–1	Sydney FC	Adelaide
19:00 ACDT		Report	Spencer 68'	Stadium: Adelaide Shores Football Centre; Referee: Kate Jacewicz

28 November 2015	Perth Glory	1–3	Melbourne Victory	Perth
16:00 AWST	May 84'	Report	Raso 9'; Nairn 51'; Knight 90'	Stadium: Ashfield Reserve; Referee: Casey Reibelt

29 November 2015	Western Sydney Wanderers	1–4	Canberra United	Gosford
14:00 AEDT	Halloway 77'	Report	Fletcher 4', 79'; Soutar 53' (o.g.); Sykes 83'	Stadium: Central Coast Stadium; Referee: Kelly Jones

29 November 2015	Brisbane Roar	0–4	Newcastle Jets	Kippa-Ring
15:00 AEST		Report	Jones 22'; Dydasco 55'; Kingsley 75'; Oyster 83'	Stadium: A.J. Kelly Park; Referee: Rachel Mitchenson

==== Round 8 ====
5 December 2015	Canberra United	2–0	Brisbane Roar	Canberra
16:00 AEDT	Sykes 45', 60'	Report		Stadium: McKellar Park; Attendance: 925; Referee: Casey Reibelt

6 December 2015	Melbourne Victory	0–4	Melbourne City	Melbourne
15:00 AEDT		Report	Beattie 35'; Crummer 52', 72'; Little 79'	Stadium: David Barro Stadium; Referee: Lara Lee

6 December 2015	Sydney FC	2–2	Western Sydney Wanderers	Sydney
16:00 AEDT	Kennedy 9'; K. Simon 74'	Report	H. Beard 19'; Grey 84'	Stadium: Lambert Park; Referee: Katie Paterson

6 December 2015	Adelaide United	1–1	Perth Glory	Adelaide
19:30 ACDT	Gummer 75'	Report	Billam 7'	Stadium: Adelaide Shores Football Centre; Referee: Rebecca Durcau

==== Round 9 ====
12 December 2015	Melbourne Victory	2–2	Western Sydney Wanderers	Melbourne
15:00 AEDT	M.J. Barbieri 52'; Dowie 75'	Report	O'Neill 40'; Moscato 46'	Stadium: David Barro Stadium; Referee: Kate Jacewicz

12 December 2015	Canberra United	4–0	Adelaide United	Canberra
16:00 AEDT	Heyman 9', 84'; McCormick 15'; Pérez 90+3' (pen.)	Report		Stadium: McKellar Park; Referee: Kelly Jones

13 December 2015	Newcastle Jets	0–1	Melbourne City	Newcastle
14:00 AEDT		Report	Goad 44'	Stadium: Hunters Stadium; Attendance: 3,292; Referee: Rachel Mitchenson

13 December 2015	Perth Glory	2–4	Sydney FC	Perth
16:00 AWST	DiBernardo 5', 85' (pen.)	Report	Spencer 26'; K. Simon 37', 84'; Bolger 48'	Stadium: Ashfield Reserve; Attendance: 458; Referee: Katie Patterson

==== Round 10 ====
19 December 2015	Newcastle Jets	1–5	Adelaide United	Newcastle
15:00 AEDT	Andrews 18' (pen.)	Report	Dahlekemper 13', 90+5'; Toby 25'; Sutton 74'; Condon 90'	Stadium: Magic Park; Attendance: 525; Referee: Kelly Jones

19 December 2015	Canberra United	3–0	Melbourne Victory	Canberra
17:00 AEDT	McCormick 47'; Sykes 56'; Heyman 81'	Report		Stadium: McKellar Park; Attendance: 667; Referee: Lara Lee

20 December 2015	Sydney FC	0–3	Brisbane Roar	Gosford
14:00 AEDT		Report	Butt 19'; Kennedy 38' (o.g.); Polkinghorne 63'	Stadium: Central Coast Stadium; Referee: Kate Jacewicz

20 December 2015	Melbourne City	4–0	Perth Glory	Melbourne
16:00 AEDT	Little 63'; Tabain 69'; Crummer 83'; Fishlock 90+3'	Report		Stadium: CB Smith Reserve; Attendance: 450; Referee: Casey Reibelt

==== Round 11 ====
27 December 2015	Melbourne Victory	1–2	Sydney FC	Melbourne
14:00 AEDT	M.J. Barbieri 47'	Report	L. Khamis 10'; Spencer 22'	Stadium: AAMI Park; Referee: Rachel Mitchenson

27 December 2015	Western Sydney Wanderers	0–1	Newcastle Jets	Sydney
15:00 AEDT		Report	Andrews 40'	Stadium: Popondetta Park; Referee: Lara Lee

28 December 2015	Brisbane Roar	0–1	Melbourne City	Gold Coast
14:30 AEST		Report	Little 6'	Stadium: Pizzey Park; Attendance: 1,672; Referee: Kelly Jones

==== Round 12 ====
2 January 2016	Perth Glory	0–2	Canberra United	Perth
16:00 AWST		Report	Brush 22'; Sykes 87'	Stadium: Ashfield Reserve; Referee: Casey Reibelt

3 January 2016	Melbourne City	4–0	Western Sydney Wanderers	Melbourne
14:00 AEDT	Little 12', 33' (pen.); Goad 66'; Tabain 70'	Report		Stadium: CB Smith Reserve; Referee: Rachel Mitchenson

3 January 2016	Newcastle Jets	0–1	Melbourne Victory	Newcastle
14:00 AEDT		Report	Dowie 13'	Stadium: Hunter Stadium; Referee: Rebecca Durcau

3 January 2016	Adelaide United	1–3	Brisbane Roar	Adelaide
15:00 ACDT	Dahlkemper 90+4'	Report	Gielnik 26'; Yallop 40'; Marzano 41'	Stadium: Adelaide Shores Football Centre; Referee: Kate Jacewicz

==== Round 13 ====
9 January 2016	Sydney FC	2–0	Newcastle Jets	Sydney
14:00 AEDT	K. Simon 33' (pen.); L. Khamis 57'	Report		Stadium: ANZ Stadium; Attendance: 2,650; Referee: Kate Jacewicz

10 January 2016	Brisbane Roar	4–0	Melbourne Victory	Gold Coast
15:00 AEDT	Polkinghorne 17'; Gorry 22'; Yallop 29'; A. Beard 90+3'	Report		Stadium: Pizzey Park; Attendance: 1,148; Referee: Casey Reibelt

10 January 2016	Canberra United	3–0	Western Sydney Wanderers	Canberra
16:00 AEDT	Munoz 6'; Kiting 11'; Sykes 58'	Report		Stadium: McKellar Park; Attendance: 1,281; Referee: Rebecca Durcau

10 January 2016	Perth Glory	2–1	Adelaide United	Perth
16:00 AWST	DiBernardo 64', 78'	Report	Dahlkemper 84'	Stadium: Ashfield Reserve; Referee: Lara Lee

==== Round 14 ====
15 January 2016	Adelaide United	1–1	Canberra United	Adelaide
19:00 ACDT	Dahlkemper 43'	Report	Pérez 23' (pen.)	Stadium: Adelaide Shores Football Centre; Referee: Casey Reibelt

16 January 2016	Melbourne City	2–1	Sydney FC	Melbourne
14:00 AEDT	Kennedy 52' (o.g.); Tabain 85'	Report	Ibini 71'	Stadium: CB Smith Reserve; Attendance: 602; Referee: Katie Patterson

17 January 2016	Newcastle Jets	0–0	Brisbane Roar	Newcastle
14:00 AEDT		Report		Stadium: Hunter Stadium; Referee: Kelly Jones

17 January 2016	Western Sydney Wanderers	2–0	Perth Glory	Sydney
15:00 AEDT	Halloway 87'; H. Beard 90+1'	Report		Stadium: Popondetta Park; Referee: Kate Jacewicz

== Finals series ==
Semi-finals
1	Melbourne City (p)	0 (5)
4	Brisbane Roar	0 (4)
2	Canberra United	0
3	Sydney FC	1

Grand Final
1	Melbourne City	4
3	Sydney FC	1

=== Semi-finals ===
24 January 2016	Canberra United	0–1	Sydney FC	Canberra
14:00 AEDT		Report	Spencer 60'	Stadium: McKellar Park; Referee: Casey Reibelt

25 January 2016	Melbourne City	0–0 (a.e.t.) (5–4 p)	Brisbane Roar	Melbourne
16:30 AEDT		Report		Stadium: AAMI Park; Attendance: 4,941; Referee: Rebecca Durcau
	Penalties
	Beattie (penalty scored); Alleway (penalty scored); Little (penalty scored); Catley (penalty scored); De Vanna (penalty scored)		(penalty scored) Polkinghorne; (penalty scored) Butt; (penalty scored) Gielnik; (penalty scored) Chapman; (penalty missed) A. Beard

=== Grand final ===
31 January 2016	Melbourne City	4–1	Sydney FC	Melbourne
14:00 AEDT	Beattie 32'; Little 54'; Goad 80'; De Vanna 90+5'	Report	K. Simon 69' (pen.)	Stadium: AAMI Park; Attendance: 4,206; Referee: Kate Jacewicz

== Season statistics ==
=== Top scorers ===
Final at end of regular season 17 January 2016

Rank	Player	Club	Goals
1	(Australia) Larissa Crummer	Melbourne City	11
2	(Scotland) Kim Little	Melbourne City	8
3	(Australia) Ashleigh Sykes	Canberra United	7
3	(Australia) Marianna Tabain	Melbourne City	7
5	(United States) Vanessa DiBernardo	Perth Glory	6
6	(United States) Abby Dahlkemper	Adelaide United	5
6	(Australia) Michelle Heyman	Canberra United	5
6	(Australia) Kyah Simon	Sydney FC	5
6	(Australia) Rosie Sutton	Adelaide United	5
10	(Australia) Leena Khamis	Sydney FC	4

=== Own goals ===
Player		Team	Against	Round
(Australia)	Cassandra Dimovski	Melbourne Victory	Western Sydney Wanderers	5
(Australia)	Rachael Soutar	Western Sydney Wanderers	Canberra United	7
(Australia)	Alanna Kennedy	Sydney FC	Brisbane Roar	10
(Australia)	Alanna Kennedy	Sydney FC	Melbourne City	14

== End-of-season awards ==
The following end of the season awards were announced at the 2015–16 Dolan Warren Awards night held at the Carriageworks in Sydney on 26 April 2016.

- Julie Dolan Medal – Ashleigh Sykes (Canberra United)
- Players’ Player of the Year – Kim Little (Melbourne City)
- Young Player of the Year – Larissa Crummer (Melbourne City)
- Golden Boot Award – Larissa Crummer (Melbourne City) (11 goals)
- Goalkeeper of the Year – Kaitlyn Savage (Adelaide United)
- Coach of the Year – Craig Deans (Newcastle Jets)
- Fair Play Award – Melbourne City
- Referee of the Year – Kate Jacewicz
- Goal of the Year – Vanessa DiBernardo (Brisbane Roar v Perth Glory, 15 November 2015)

== See also ==
- 2015–16 Adelaide United W-League season
- 2015–16 Brisbane Roar W-League season
- 2015–16 Canberra United FC (women) season
- 2015–16 Melbourne City W-League season
- 2015–16 Newcastle Jets FC (women) season
- 2015–16 Perth Glory W-League season
