= Emily Henderson (soccer) =

Australian soccer player (born 1997)

Personal information
- Full name: Emily Henderson
- Date of birth: 12 March 1997 (age 29)
- Place of birth: Australia
- Position: Midfielder

Youth career
- Perth Hills United FC
- FW NTC

Senior career*
Years	Team	Apps	(Gls)
2013–2017	Perth Glory	12	(0)

International career^{‡}
2012–2013	Australia U17	5	(0)
- * Club domestic league appearances and goals as of 27 October 2017 ‡ National team caps and goals as of 2 October 2016

Emily Henderson (born 12 March 1997) is an Australian football (soccer) player, who last played for Perth Glory in the Australian W-League.

== Early life ==
Henderson grew up in Perth. Henderson took up soccer at a young age, playing for a boys team at the Perth Hills United Football Club. She represented Australia in futsal at under-13 level. In 2009, Henderson played for the Western Australian under-14 team at the age of 11. In 2010, Henderson was selected for the Australian under-13 team at the Asian Football Confederation Festival of Football tournament in Vietnam. In July 2011, her performance at the national under-14 girls’ soccer championship, helped secure a position on Western Australia's under-15 national training center team. In July 2012 she captained a Western Australia (WA) under-15 team to the national championships. Her performance on the left wing was praised as "mature and influential" by the team's technical director and she was the only WA player to be selected for the tournament all-star game.

== Club career ==
At the age of 16, Henderson signed for Perth Glory, originally as an injury replacement in late 2013. Henderson made three appearances for the club during the 2013–14 W-League season. in which the Glory finished in fifth place during the regular season with a 5–7–0 record.

Henderson returned to the Glory for the 2015–16 season and made nine appearances for the club. The club finished in eighth place with a 3–7–2 record.

In October 2017, it was confirmed that Henderson didn't re-sign with Perth Glory for the 2017–18 W-League season.

== International career ==
Henderson has represented Australia on the women's national under-17 soccer team.

== Honors and awards ==
with Perth Glory

- W-League regular season winner: 2014–15
- W-League Grand Final runners-up: 2014–15
