= Kobie Ferguson =

Australian football player

Personal information
- Full name: Kobie Ferguson
- Date of birth: March 1999 (age 27)
- Place of birth: Australia
- Height: 1.70 m (5 ft 7 in)
- Position: Midfielder

Senior career*
Years	Team	Apps	(Gls)
2015–2016	Newcastle Jets	5	(0)

International career
2014	Australia U-17		
2014–	Australia U-20		
- * Club domestic league appearances and goals as of 30 October 2016

Kobie Ferguson (born March 1999) is an Australian football (soccer) player, who last played for Broadmeadow Magic and Newcastle Jets in the Australian W-League.

== Playing career ==
=== Club ===
==== Newscastle Jets, 2015–2016 ====
Ferguson signed with Newcastle Jets in 2015. She made her debut for the team during a match against Perth Glory on 24 October 2015. During the 2015–16 W-League season, she made five appearances for Newcastle and helped the team finish in sixth place with a 3–5–4 record.

=== International ===
Ferguson has represented Australia on the under-17 and under-20 national teams. In 2015, she captained the Young Matildas at the 2016 AFF Women's Championship in Vietnam.

=== Recent sightings ===
Finnegans hotel, Coal and Cedar, Mavericks, Foodworks, Redhead Beach, Royal Crown Hotel. Ferguson enjoys hanging with her dog, Cassie and her friend Jasmine Mills.
