= Larissa Crummer =

Australian soccer player

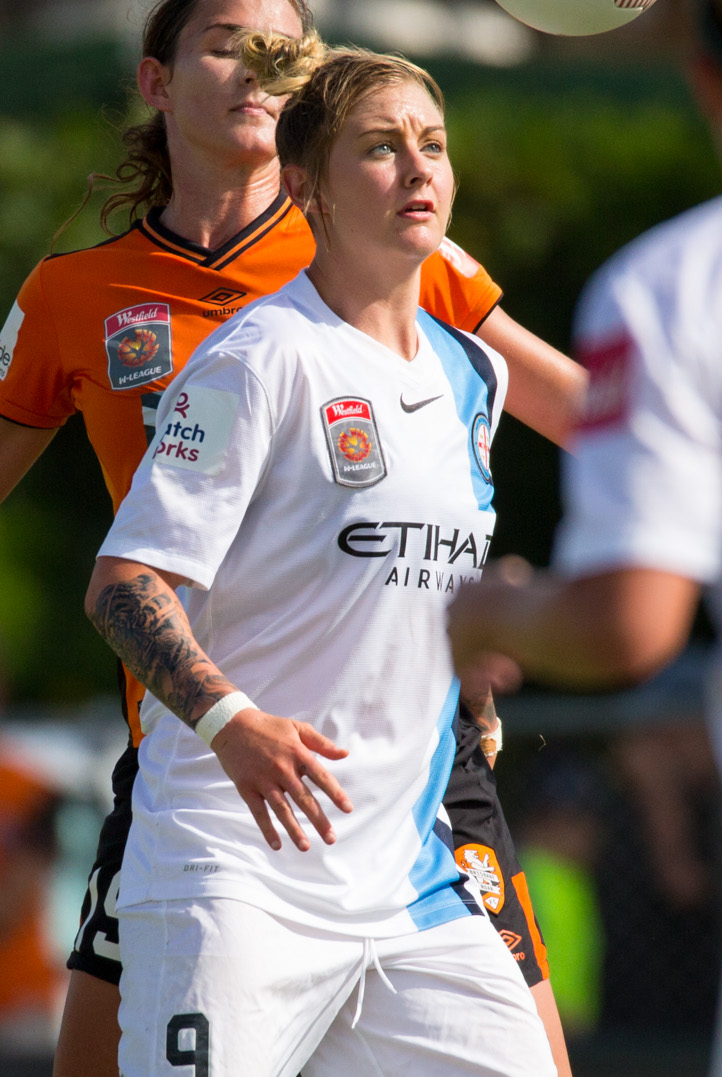
- Crummer playing for Melbourne City in 2015

Personal information
- Full name: Larissa Rose Crummer
- Date of birth: 10 January 1996 (age 30)
- Place of birth: Nambour, Queensland, Australia
- Height: 1.78 m (5 ft 10 in)
- Position: Forward

Team information
- Current team: Brann
- Number: 24

Senior career*
Years	Team	Apps	(Gls)
2012–2013	Sydney FC	13	(0)
2013–2015	Brisbane Roar	24	(1)
2015–2018	Melbourne City	23	(14)
2017	Seattle Reign FC	4	(1)
2018–2019	Newcastle Jets	8	(0)
2021–2023	Brisbane Roar	34	(13)
2023–2024	Brann	23	(3)

International career^{‡}
2013	Australia U-20	9	(1)
2015–2023	Australia	33	(4)
- * Club domestic league appearances and goals as of 29 March 2023 ‡ National team caps and goals as of 07 April 2023

Larissa Rose Crummer OLY (born 10 January 1996) is an Australian retired professional soccer player who last played as a forward for Brann in the Norwegian Toppserien. She also represented the Australia women's national team, commonly known as the Matildas. Crummer previously played in the Australian W-League for Melbourne City, Brisbane Roar, Sydney FC, and the Newcastle Jets.

== Early life ==
Raised in Tewantin, Queensland a suburb located in Australia's Sunshine Coast Region, Crummer began playing football at the age of 5.

Crummer scored 12 goals at the national titles in 2011 and was a member of the Brisbane Premier League-winning team Peninsula Power FC the same year. She was a student at the Kawana Waters State College Football School of Excellence.

== Club career ==
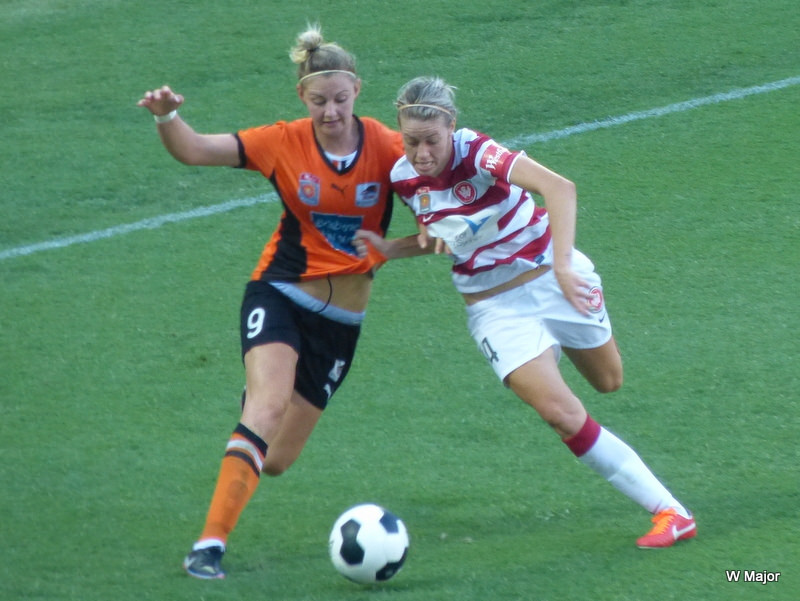
Crummer (left) playing for Brisbane Roar in 2014

=== Sydney FC ===
At the age of 16, Crummer made her professional debut for Sydney FC during the 2012–13 season helping the team win the league championship playing primarily as a defender.

=== Brisbane Roar ===
The following season she returned to Queensland to play for Brisbane Roar for the 2013–14 season. She made 13 appearances for the club and scored one goal. The Roar finished fourth during the regular season with a 7–3–2 record. The team advanced to the semi-finals where they defeated Canberra United 2–1 but were defeated 2–0 by Melbourne Victory in the Grand Final.

Crummer returned to the Roar for the 2014 season and made ten appearances for the club. The team finished in sixth place during the regular season.

=== Melbourne City ===
In September 2015, Crummer signed with Melbourne City. During the team's first match of the season against Sydney FC, she scored the team's first-ever goal in the 11th minute and followed with another in the last six minutes of the first half for a 6–0 win. On 21 November, she scored a brace to help defeat her former team Brisbane Roar 4–0. On 6 December, she scored a brace against Melbourne Victory contributing to City's 4–0 win over the rival team and extending City's regular season record to 8–0–0.

In May 2016 Crummer signed on loan at Victorian NPLW club Alamein FC.

She returned to Melbourne City for the 2016–17 W-League campaign, but after making only three appearances her season was cut short by a foot injury in January 2017.

Crummer returned to Melbourne City for the 2017–18 W-League season. She appeared in 8 games and scored 3 goals as Melbourne City won their third consecutive W-League Championship.

=== Seattle Reign FC ===
In January 2017, Crummer signed with Seattle Reign FC, effective upon the conclusion of the 2016–17 W-League season. Due to injury she only appeared in four games for Seattle, scoring one goal. She was released by the club in February 2018.

=== Newcastle Jets ===
On 20 August 2018 Crummer signed a one-year contract to join the Newcastle Jets for the 2018-19 W-League season. Despite deciding in October 2019, to rehabilitate from a leg break with Newcastle Jets, a month later, it was announced she would miss the 2019–20 W-League season.

=== Return to Brisbane Roar ===
In February 2021, Crummer returned to Brisbane Roar.

=== Brann ===
In March 2023, Crummer transferred to Norwegian club Brann. In March 2024, Following Brann's elimination against Barcelona in the UEFA Women's Champions League quarter-finals, she announced her retirement from professional football.

North Lakes United FC

In October, 2026, Crummer signed for Queensland NPLW club North Lakes United, marking her return to football after a short stint playing rugby league. The signing marked significant intent by the club in their promotion back into the NPLW.

== International career ==
At the age of 14, Crummer was called up to the Young Matildas. She made her debut for the Matildas and scored her first international goal against the Netherlands in March 2015. The same year, she was the youngest player on the team at the 2015 FIFA Women's World Cup in Canada where she made two appearances for Australia.

Crummer was again called in to the Matildas for the 2016 AFC Women's Olympic Qualifying Tournament, but she suffered a knee injury during a training match prior to the competition and was replaced on the squad by Ashleigh Sykes. She recovered in time to be named to the Matildas' Olympic squad, where she made two appearances as a substitute.

Crummer was named to the Australian squad for the 2018 AFC Women's Asian Cup, but she did not appear in any games. Australia finished Runner-up to Japan, and qualified for the 2019 FIFA Women's World Cup.

== Career statistics ==
=== International goals ===
Key (expand for notes on "international goals" and sorting)
Location	Geographic location of the venue where the competition occurred Sorted by country name first, then by city name
Lineup	Start – played entire match on minute (off player) – substituted on at the minute indicated, and player was substituted off at the same time off minute (on player) – substituted off at the minute indicated, and player was substituted on at the same time (c) – captain Sorted by minutes played
#	NumberOfGoals.goalNumber scored by the player in the match (alternate notation to Goal in match)
Min	The minute in the match the goal was scored. For list that include caps, blank indicates played in the match but did not score a goal.
Assist/pass	The ball was passed by the player, which assisted in scoring the goal. This column depends on the availability and source of this information.
penalty or pk	Goal scored on penalty-kick which was awarded due to foul by opponent. (Goals scored in penalty-shoot-out, at the end of a tied match after extra-time, are not included.)
Score	The match score after the goal was scored. Sorted by goal difference, then by goal scored by the player's team
Result	The final score. Sorted by goal difference in the match, then by goal difference in penalty-shoot-out if it is taken, followed by goal scored by the player's team in the match, then by goal scored in the penalty-shoot-out. For matches with identical final scores, match ending in extra-time without penalty-shoot-out is a tougher match, therefore precede matches that ended in regulation
aet	The score at the end of extra-time; the match was tied at the end of 90' regulation
pso	Penalty-shoot-out score shown in parentheses; the match was tied at the end of extra-time
	Green background color – exhibition or closed door international friendly match
	Yellow background color – match at an invitational tournament
	Red background color – Olympic women's football qualification match
	Light-blue background color – FIFA women's world cup qualification match
	Pink background color – Olympic women's football tournament
	Blue background color – FIFA women's world cup final tournament
NOTE: some keys may not apply for a particular football player

Goal	Date	Location	Opponent	Score	Result	Competition
1.	4 March 2015	GSZ Stadium, Larnaca, Cyprus	Netherlands	1–0	1–0	2015 Cyprus Cup
2.	23 July 2016	Estádio Presidente Vargas, Fortaleza, Brazil	Brazil	1–0	1–3	Friendly
3.	28 February 2018	Albufeira Municipal Stadium, Albufeira, Portugal	Norway	4–3	4–3	2018 Algarve Cup
4.	26 March 2018	nib Stadium, Perth, Australia	Thailand	5–0	5–0	Friendly

== Honours ==
=== Club ===
Sydney FC

- W-League Championship: 2012–13

Melbourne City

- W-League Championship: 2015–16, 2016–17
- W-League Premiership: 2015–16

=== Individual ===
- W-League Golden Boot: 2015–16
- W-League Young Player of the Year: 2015–16

== Rugby league ==
In 2025, following her retirement from football, Crummer began playing rugby league for the Sunshine Coast Falcons in the QRL Women's Premiership. Growing up she had played touch football, and later, Oztag socially.

Playing as a winger, she scored five tries in her first five games, including a hat-trick in their Round 4 win over the Mackay Cutters.

In August 2025, she was invited to compete in the Harvey Norman Rising Talent Invitational at the NRLW's Magic Round in Newcastle, in hopes of securing an NRLW contract.
