= Caprice Dydasco =

American soccer player (born 1993)

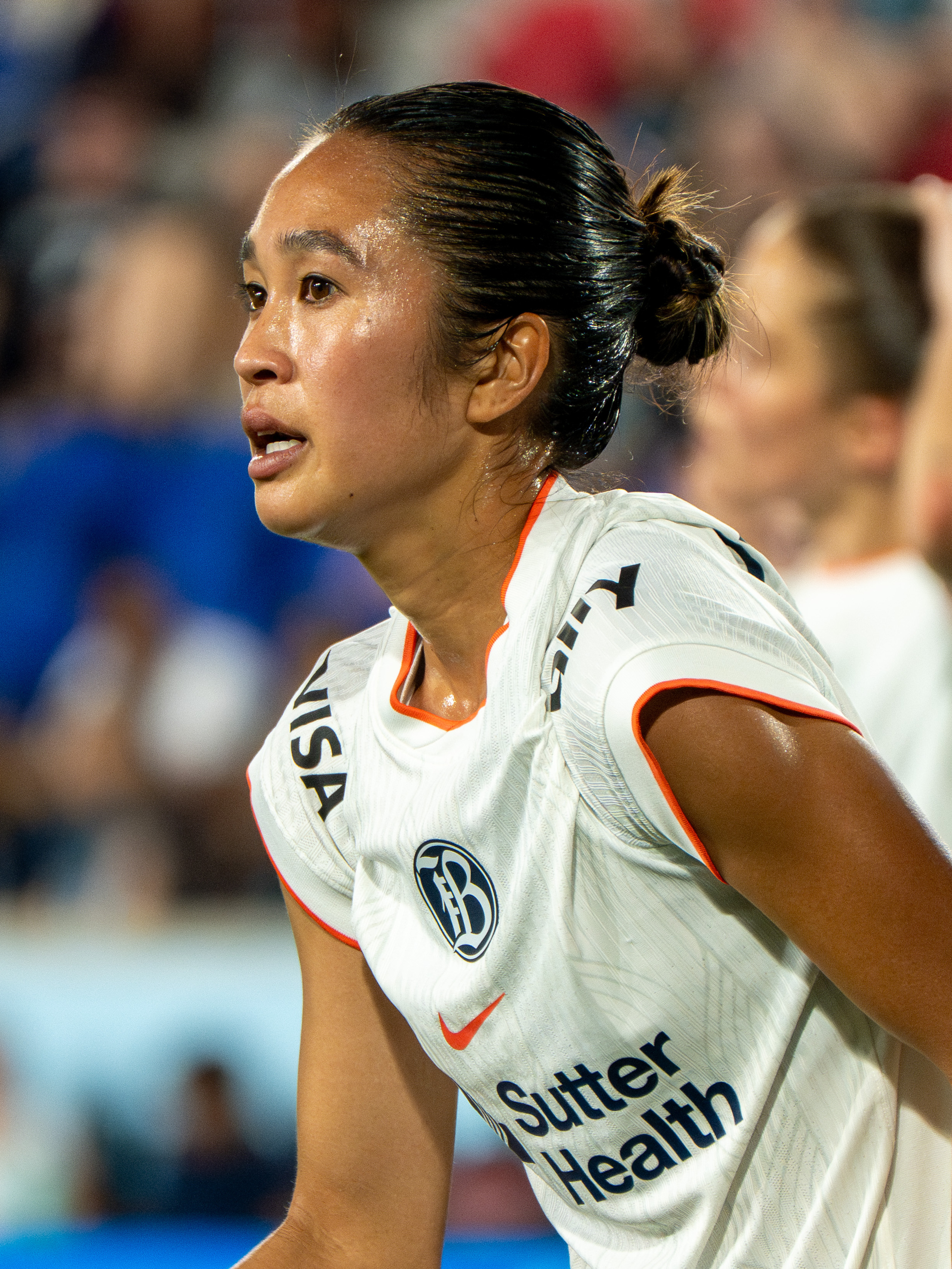
- Dydasco with Bay FC in 2025

Personal information
- Full name: Caprice Ka'anohikula Dydasco
- Date of birth: August 19, 1993 (age 33)
- Place of birth: Honolulu, Hawaii, United States
- Height: 5 ft 3 in (1.60 m)
- Position: Defender

Youth career
- Honolulu Bulls

College career
Years	Team	Apps	(Gls)
2011–2014	UCLA Bruins		

Senior career*
Years	Team	Apps	(Gls)
2013–2014	Pali Blues	17	(0)
2015–2018	Washington Spirit	58	(0)
2015–2016	→ Newcastle Jets (loan)	12	(1)
2019–2022	NJ/NY Gotham FC	60	(1)
2022–2023	Houston Dash	28	(0)
2024–2026	Bay FC	51	(0)

International career^{‡}
2009–2010	United States U-17		
2012	United States U-20		
2014–2016	United States U-23	5	(0)
- * Club domestic league appearances and goals as of November 8, 2025 ‡ National team caps and goals as of February 17, 2015

Caprice Ka'anohikula Dydasco (born August 19, 1993) is an American professional soccer player who plays as a right back. She previously played for the Washington Spirit, NJ/NY Gotham FC, the Houston Dash, and Bay FC of the National Women's Soccer League (NWSL). She was voted the NWSL Defender of the Year while with Gotham FC in 2021. She played college soccer with the UCLA Bruins, winning the NCAA championship in 2013.

== Early life ==
The daughter of Jose and Misty Dydasco, Dydasco played soccer for Kamehameha Schools in Honolulu and the Honolulu Bulls Soccer Club. She was a youth All-American in 2009 and 2010. Her brother, Zane Dydasco, played soccer for the United States Air Force Academy. Her sister True played soccer for the University of Oregon.

== College career ==
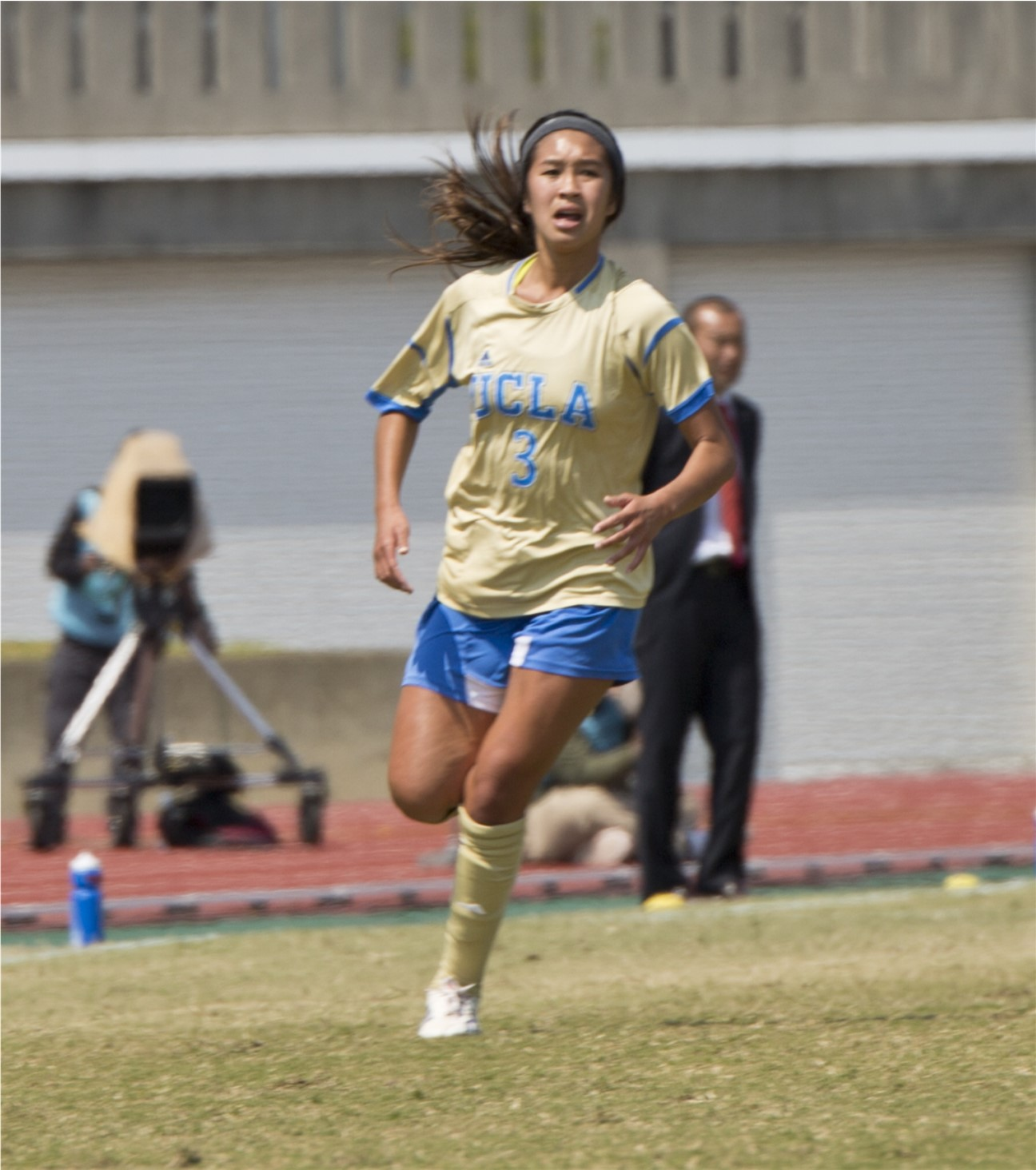
Dydasco playing for UCLA in 2014

Dydasco was a four-year starter as a defender for the UCLA Bruins from 2011 to 2014. She appeared in 94 games and scored five goals and had 23 assists. As a junior she helped UCLA to win their first NCAA championship.

== Club career ==
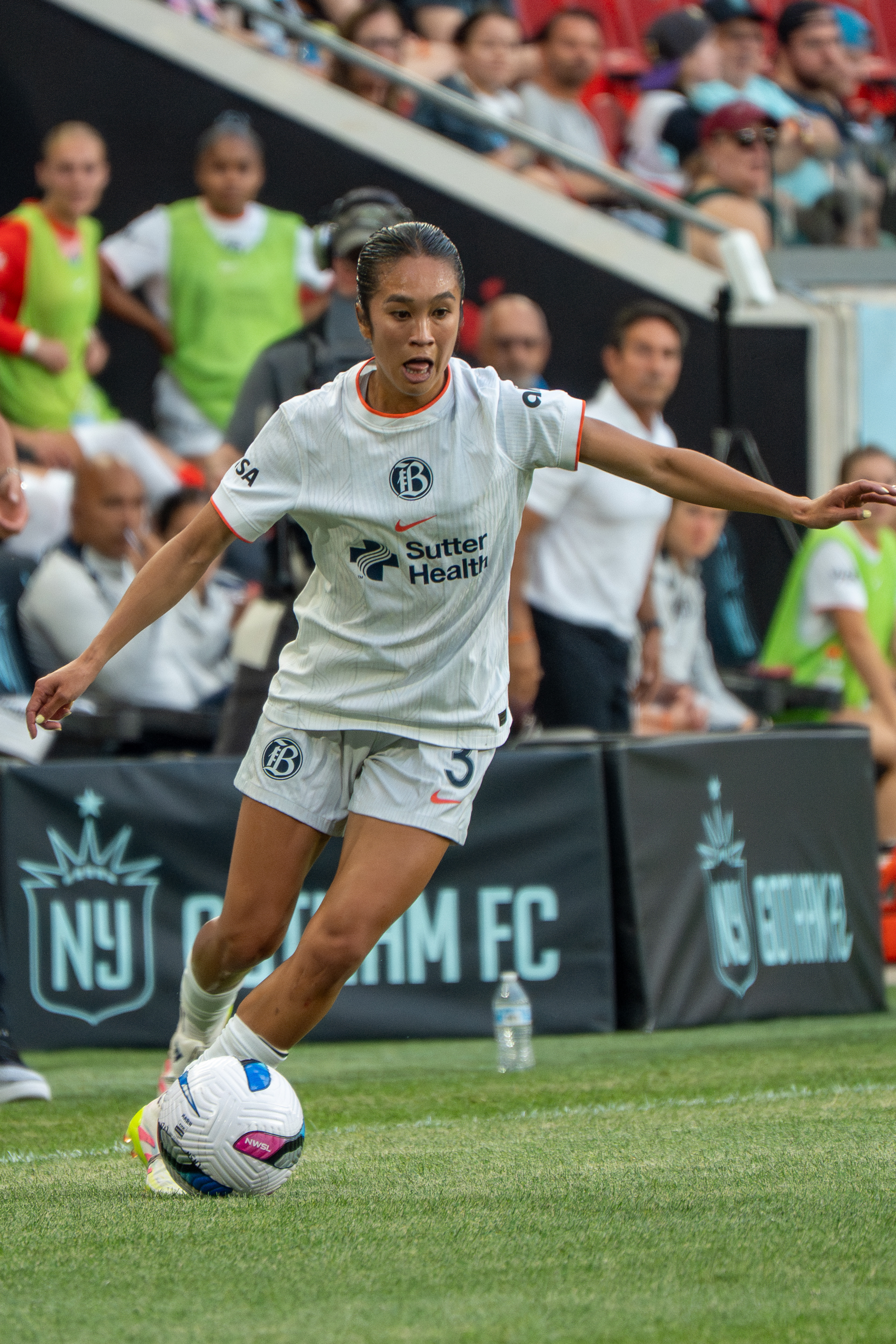
Dydasco with Bay FC in 2025

=== Pali Blues ===
Dydasco played for the semi-professional Pali Blues in 2013 and 2014. In March 2014, playing in the midfield for the United States women's national under-23 soccer team, she assisted on the game-winning goal to win the Six Nations Tournament in Spain. In March 2015 Dydasco started all three of the matches of the United States under-23 team at a tournament in La Manga Club, Spain.

=== Washington Spirit ===
On January 16, 2015, Dydasco was drafted to play for the Washington Spirit in the National Women's Soccer League. She was the nineteenth player picked in the draft. She is "known for speed" and was described by Spirit coach Mark Parsons as "the most attacking defender out there." She played in six matches for the Spirit in 2015.

In 2016, Dydasco started in 12 regular season and both post season matches for the Spirit. In the NWSL championship on October 9, Dydasco suffered a torn ACL (Anterior cruciate ligament injury) and was unable to join the Newcastle Jets for the 2016–2017 season.

Dydasco signed a new contract with the Spirit on June 14, 2017. After missing the first part of the 2017 season as she was still recovering from injury, Dydasco make her return to the field on June 24 against the Portland Thorns.

==== Loan to Newcastle Jets ====
On October 8, 2015, Dydasco joined Australian W-League club Newcastle Jets on loan for the 2015–16 season.

=== NJ/NY Gotham FC ===
In January 2019, Dydasco was traded to Sky Blue FC along with teammates DiDi Haracic and Estelle Johnson for the third overall and 29th picks of the 2019 NWSL College Draft.

On October 6, 2021, Dydasco made her 100th regular-season appearance in the NWSL. Following five appearances on the NWSL Team of the Month lists during the 2021 season, Dydasco was named as the NWSL Defender of the Year on November 15, 2021. She was also named to the NWSL Best XI alongside teammates Kailen Sheridan and Margaret Purce as part of the 2021 NWSL awards. She appeared in every match for Gotham FC, playing over 2000 minutes, notching five assists, and scoring her first career goal.

Dydasco signed a new two-year contract with Gotham FC prior to the start of the 2022 season.

=== Houston Dash ===
On August 19, 2022, Gotham FC traded Dydasco to the Houston Dash in exchange for $120,000 in allocation money, and an additional $10,000 for every postseason match she plays for the Dash, up to a total of $150,000. Playing in her third game of the 2023 season for the Dash, Dydasco passed the 10,000 minute mark, making her the 32nd player in the league to achieve this accomplishment.

=== Bay FC ===
On November 21, 2023, NWSL expansion side Bay FC signed Dydasco as a free agent, making her their second ever player and first ever free agent signing. She made 51 league appearances across her first two seasons with the club before missing the third due to maternity leave. At the end of 2026, Dydasco departed from Bay FC as a free agent.

== International career ==
Dydasco began playing for U.S. national soccer teams at the age of 14. She was a starter on the United States women's national under-17 soccer team in 2009, but was injured and unable to compete in the 2010 FIFA U-17 Women's World Cup.

== Personal life ==
Dydasco is of Guamanian descent through her father, and is of Japanese, Chinese, Korean, and Hawaiian descent through her mother. She married Adam Thomas on January 4th, 2025.

== Honors ==
Individual

- NWSL Defender of the Year: 2021
- NWSL Best XI: 2021
