= Ashfield Arena =

Sporting ground in Ashfield, Western Australia

Coordinates: 31°54′51″S 115°56′16″E

Ashfield Arena is a sporting ground located in Ashfield, a northeastern suburb of Perth, Western Australia. It is the home ground of Football West State League Division One side Ashfield Sports Club.

It became the home ground of the Perth Glory FC women's team from the 2014 season onwards. Similarly, the Perth Glory Youth team have played their home games there for the National Premier Leagues WA and the National Youth League (Australia) competitions since the 2015–16 National Youth League season. In 2016 Ashfield Reserve was named as the preferred site for the State Football Centre. Football West chairman Luke Twigger said:

Football West will work closely with local, State and Commonwealth governments, as well as other stakeholders, to ensure the best possible outcome for the sport and the Ashfield Reserve precinct.

Football West Chief Executive Officer James Curtis said the facility would serve football's needs as well as contributing greatly to the local community and the city's growing eastern corridor.

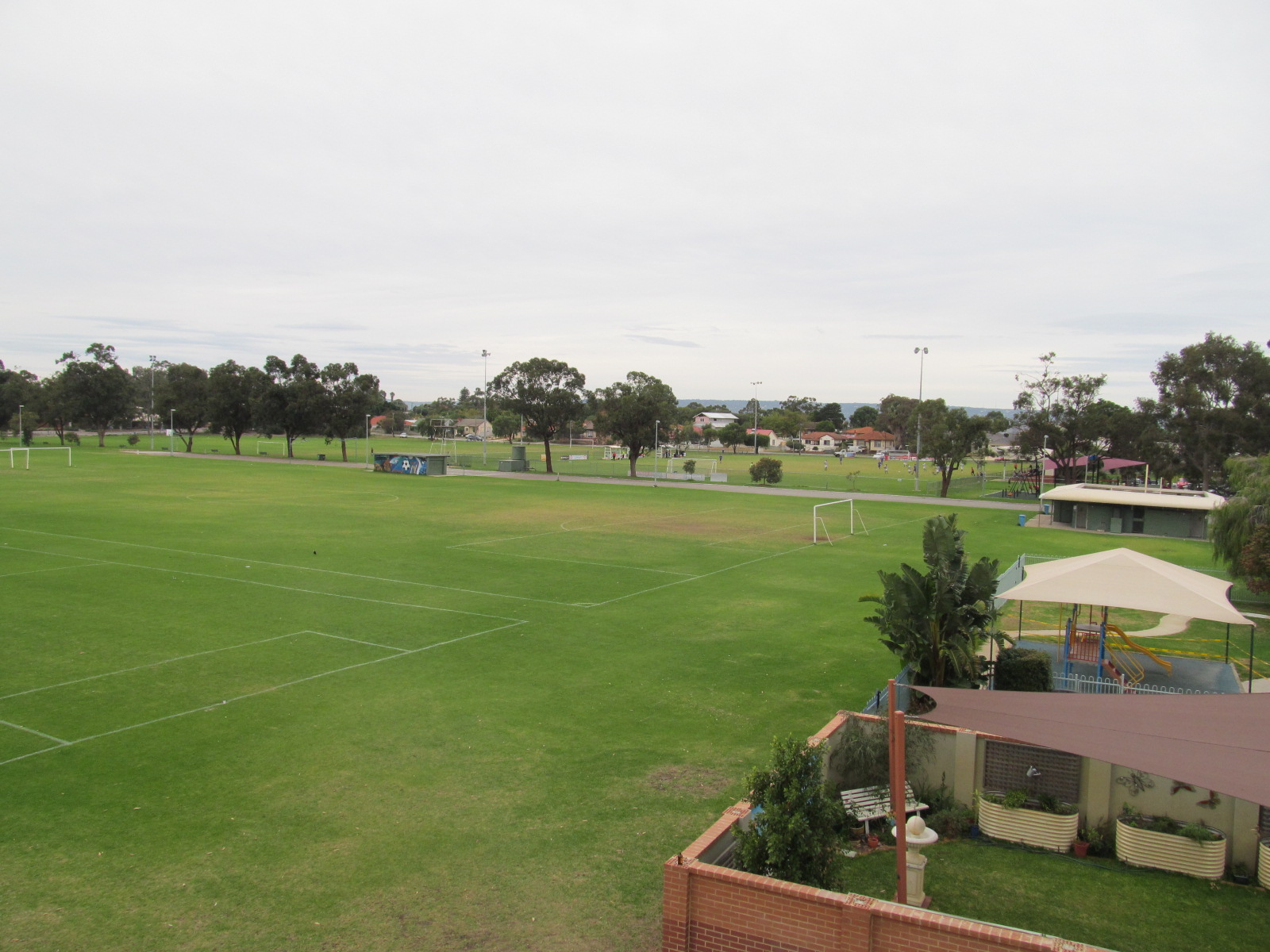
Ashfield Reserve
