= Gabe Marzano =

Australian soccer player (born 1992)

Personal information
- Full name: Gabe Marzano
- Date of birth: 12 February 1992 (age 34)
- Place of birth: Australia
- Position: Striker

Senior career*
Years	Team	Apps	(Gls)
2014–2015	Perth Glory	13	(1)
2015–2016	Brisbane Roar	11	(2)
2016–2017	Sydney FC	0	(0)
2021	Melbourne Victory	0	(0)
- * Club domestic league appearances and goals as of 27 October 2017

Gabrielle "Gabe” Marzano (born 12 February 1992) is an Australian soccer player, who last played for Melbourne Victory in the Australian W-League. She previously played for Brisbane Roar, Perth Glory, and Sydney FC.

== Early life and work ==
Born in Harvey, Western Australia, a small town 140 km south of Perth, Marzano was raised in Townsville, a city on the northeastern coast of Queensland. She began playing soccer at the age of five. She attended military college in Canberra and later moved to Brisbane with the army.

Marzano was the first woman to qualify as a combat engineer diver with the Australian Army. She was an officer in 5th Engineer Regiment (Australia).

== Playing career ==
In 2014, Marzano contacted Perth Glory head coach Jamie Harnwell to try out for the W-League team. She was selected amongst 30 trialists to sign with the team for the 2014 W-League. With her 13 appearances and one goal, she helped lead the team to its first regular season title the same season with a 10–2–0 record. Perth advanced to the semifinals where they defeated Sydney FC 3–0 with Marzano scoring in the second half after coming on as a substitute. The team faced Canberra United in the Grand Final but were defeated 3–1.

Marzano signed with Brisbane Roar for the 2015–16 W-League season. She made 11 appearances and scored two goals helping the club finish fourth during the regular season with a 5–6–1 record and advance to the playoffs. During the semifinal match where they faced regular-season winners Melbourne City, Brisbane was defeated 5–4 during a penalty kick shootout after regular and overtime yielded no goals for either side.

In September 2016, it was speculated Marzano would join Western Sydney Wanderers for the 2016–17 W-League season, having relocated to Sydney. However, in November 2016, Sydney FC officially announced that Marzano had joined the Sky Blues.

In October 2017, it was confirmed that Sydney FC had not re-signed Marzano for the 2017–18 W-League season.

In March 2021, Melbourne Victory signed Marzano as an injury replacement player to replace Natalie Tathem who suffered a season-ending knee injury.

== Professional Footballers Australia ==
In May 2016, Marzano was appointed to the Executive Committee of Professional Footballers Australia. PFA Chairman Craig Foster said of her appointment, "Nigel, Kim and Gabe are outstanding people and leaders and we are delighted that they have accepted the offer to join the Executive. Many of Australian football’s most respected figures such as Tim Cahill, Alex Tobin and Kathryn Gill have served on the Executive Committee and I have no doubt that they will build on the proud legacy of those that have come before them."

== Honours ==
with Perth Glory

- W-League Premiership: 2014
