= List of Melbourne City FC (women) seasons =

Melbourne City Football Club (A-League Women), is an Australian professional women's association football club based in Cranbourne East, Melbourne. The club was founded in 2015.

As of the end of the 2022–23 season, the club have spent eight seasons in the A-League Women, the top division of Australian women's soccer. Their worst league finish to date is 7th in the 2020–21 season. They won thee Grand Final in their first three seasons of existence. Hannah Wilkinson holds the record for most competitive goals in a single season for Melbourne City (A-League Women); she scored 14 during the 2021–22 season. The table details the league records, and the top scorers for each season.

== Key ==
Key to colours and symbols:

1st or W	Winners
2nd or RU	Runners-up
3rd	Third
♦	Top scorer in division

Key to league record:

- Season = The year and article of the season
- Pos = Final position
- Pld = Games played
- W = Games won
- D = Games drawn
- L = Games lost
- GF = Goals scored
- GA = Goals against
- Pts = Points

Key to finals record:

- DNQ = Did not qualify
- SF = Semi-finals
- PF = Prelimainry Final
- RU = Runners-up
- W = Winners

== Seasons ==
Results of league and finals competitions by season
Season	Division	P	W	D	L	F	A	Pts	Pos	Finals	Competition	Result	Name	Goals
Season	League									Finals	Other / Asia		Top goalscorer	
2015–16	W-League	12	12	0	0	38	4	36	1st	W	—	—	Larissa Crummer	11 ♦
2016–17	W-League	12	6	2	4	19	14	20	4th	W	—	—	Jess Fishlock	8
2017–18	W-League	12	6	2	4	20	15	20	4th	W	—	—	Jess Fishlock	7
2018–19	W-League	12	6	1	5	20	15	19	5th	DNQ	—	—	Jasmyne Spencer	4
2019–20	W-League	12	11	1	0	27	4	34	1st	W	—	—	Kyah Simon; Emily van Egmond	6
2020–21	W-League	12	4	1	7	11	23	13	7th	DNQ	—	—	Alex Chidiac	3
2021–22	A-League Women	14	11	0	3	29	11	33	2nd	PF	—	—	Hannah Wilkinson	14
2022–23	A-League Women	18	9	3	6	36	23	30	3rd	SF	—	—	Rhianna Pollicina	10
2023–24	A-League Women	22	12	5	5	40	29	41	1st	RU	—	—	Hannah Wilkinson	10
2023–24	A-League Women	23	16	7	0	56	22	55	1st	SF	AFC Women's Champions League	TBD	TBD	TBD
