= List of Melbourne City FC (women) records and statistics =

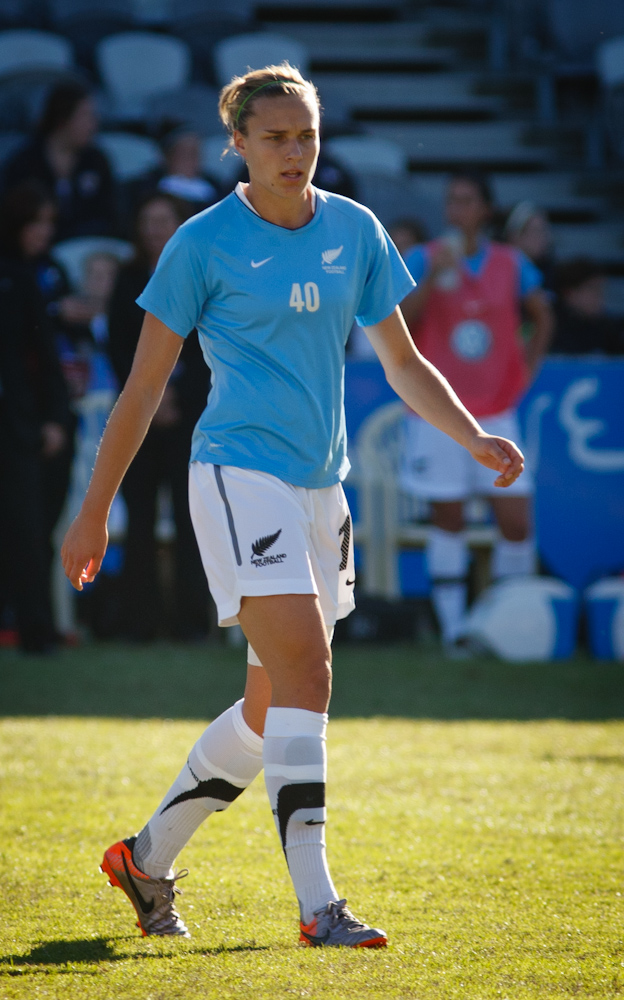
Hannah Wilkinson is Melbourne City (women)'s second highest goalscorer.

Melbourne City Football Club (women) is an Australian professional women's association football club based in Cranbourne East, Melbourne. The club was formed in 2015 joining the W-League (now A-League Women), six years after the men's club was formed.

The list encompasses the records set by the club, their managers and their players. The player records section itemises the club's leading goalscorers and those who have made most appearances in first-team competitions. Attendance records at AAMI Park and the Casey Fields complex are also included.

The club's record appearance maker is Rebekah Stott, who made 141 regular season appearances between 2015 and 2026. Holly McNamara is the club's record goalscorer, scoring 41 goals (regular season).

All figures are correct as of 16 October 2026.

== Honours ==
- A-League Women Premiership

Winners (3): 2015–16, 2019–20, 2023–24
Runners-up (1): 2021–22

- A-League Women Championship

Winners (4): 2016, 2017, 2018, 2020
Runners-up (1): 2024

== Player records ==
=== Appearances ===
- Most regular season appearances: Rebekah Stott, 141
- Most total club appearances: Rebekah Stott, 160
- Youngest first-team player: 15 years 96 days Nia Stamatopoulos (against Canberra United) 28 October 2018
- Oldest first-team player: Melissa Barbieri, 46 years, 75 days (against Newcastle Jets, A-League Women, 5 April 2026)
- Most consecutive appearances: Lauren Barnes, 46 (from 8 January 2017 to 22 March 2020)

==== Most appearances ====
Competitive matches only, includes appearances as a substitute. Numbers in brackets indicate goals scored.

Rank	Player	Years	A-League Women		AFC Women's Champions League	Total
Rank	Player	Years	Regular season	Finals series	AFC Women's Champions League	Total
1	(New Zealand) Rebekah Stott	2015–2017; 2019–2020; 2021–2022; 2023–	141 (8)	14 (1)	5 (1)	160 (10)
2	(Australia) Rhianna Pollicina	2021–	74 (25)	7 (3)	4 (1)	85 (29)
3	(Australia) Leticia McKenna	2021–	72 (7)	8 (2)	5 (0)	85 (9)
4	(Australia) Leah Davidson	2020–	74 (0)	6 (0)	4 (0)	84 (0)
5	(Serbia) Tyla-Jay Vlajnic	2015–2022; 2024–	70 (1)	7 (0)	4 (1)	81 (2)
6	(Australia) Bryleeh Henry	2021–	53 (8)	6 (1)	5 (0)	64 (9)
7	(Australia) Steph Catley	2015–2020	74 (2)	8 (1)	0 (0)	62 (3)
8	(Australia) Emma Checker	2019–2023	49 (2)	5 (0)	0 (0)	54 (2)
9	(Australia) Laura Hughes	2019–2023	47 (4)	3 (0)	3 (0)	53 (4)
9	(United States) Taylor Otto	2023–	45 (6)	5 (0)	3 (0)	53 (6)

=== Goalscorers ===
- Most goals in a season: Holly McNamara, 15 (twice, 2024–25 and 2025–26 seasons); Hannah Wilkinson, 14 goals (2021–22 season)
- Youngest goalscorer: Shelby McMahon, 15 years, 335 days (against Perth Glory, 31 March 2024)
- Oldest goalscorer: Yukari Kinga, 35 years, 224 days (against Melbourne Victory, 12 November 2019)
- Most consecutive goalscoring appearances: Holly McNamara, 6 (from 16 March to 18 April 2025)

==== Top goalscorers ====
Competitive matches only. Numbers in brackets indicate appearances made.

Statistics accurate as of 13 November 2025.

Rank	Player	Years	A-League Women		AFC Women's Champions League	Total
Rank	Player	Years	Regular season	Finals series	AFC Women's Champions League	Total
1	(Australia) Holly McNamara	2021–	28 (40)	0 (3)	3 (4)	31 (47)
2	(New Zealand) Hannah Wilkinson	2021–2024	26 (45)	4 (6)	0 (0)	30 (51)
3	(Australia) Rhianna Pollicina	2021–	25 (74)	3 (7)	1 (4)	29 (85)
4	(Wales) Jess Fishlock	2015–2018	13 (32)	4 (6)	0 (0)	17 (38)
5	(Australia) Larissa Crummer	2015–2018	14 (21)	0 (2)	0 (0)	14 (23)
6	(Bosnia and Herzegovina) Emina Ekic	2022; 2023–2024	11 (24)	1 (3)	0 (0)	12 (27)
7	(Venezuela) Mariana Speckmaier	2024–2025	7 (22)	0 (1)	5 (6)	12 (29)
8	(Australia) Kyah Simon	2017–2020	9 (27)	2 (4)	0 (0)	10 (31)
8	(Australia) Marianna Tabain	2015–2017	11 (18)	0 (1)	0 (0)	10 (27)
10	(Australia) Daniela Galic	2022–2024	8 (35)	1 (6)	0 (0)	9 (39)
10	(Australia) Bryleeh Henry	2021–	8 (53)	1 (6)	0 (5)	9 (64)
10	(Australia) Kim Little	2015–2016	8 (10)	1 (2)	0 (0)	9 (12)
10	(Australia) Leticia McKenna	2021–	7 (72)	2 (8)	0 (5)	9 (85)

== Head coach records ==
- First full-time head coach: Joe Montemurro coached Melbourne City (women) from July 2015 to January 2017
- Longest-serving head coach: Rado Vidošić – 3 years, 205 days (1 July 2018 to 22 November 2022).
- Shortest tunure as head coach: Jess Fishlock (player-coach) – 85 days (5 January 2017 to 31 March 2017).
- Highest win percentage: Joe Montemurro, 81.82%
- Lowest win percentage: Dario Vidošić, 52.38%

== Club records ==
=== Matches ===
==== Firsts ====
- First A-League Women match: Sydney FC 0–6 Melbourne City, 18 October 2015
- First A-League Women finals match: Melbourne City 0–0 (5–4p) Brisbane Roar, Semi-finals, 25 January 2016
- First home match: Melbourne City 2–1 Melbourne Victory, AAMI Park, A-League Women, 25 October 2015
- First AFC Women's Champions League match: Melbourne City 2–1 Bam Khatoon, 6 October 2024

==== Record results ====
- Record win: 6–0 against Sydney FC, W-League, 18 October 2015
- Record defeat: 0–6 against Melbourne Victory, W-League, 10 January 2021
- Record consecutive wins: 18, from 18 October 2015 to 4 December 2016
- Record consecutive defeats: 5, from 21 January 2021 to 11 March 2021
- Record consecutive matches without a defeat: 28, from 6 October 2024 to 3 May 2025
- Record consecutive matches without a win: 6, from 10 December 2016 to 15 January 2017
- Record consecutive matches without conceding a goal: 7, from 12 December 2019 to 20 February 2020
- Record consecutive matches without scoring a goal: 3, from 4 February 2021 to 11 March 2021

=== Goals ===
- Most league goals scored in a season: 56 in 22 matches, 2024–25
- Fewest league goals scored in a season: 19 in 12 matches, 2016–17
- Most league goals conceded in a season: 29 in 22 matches, 2023–24
- Fewest league goals conceded in a season:
  - 4 in 12 matches, 2015–16
  - 4 in 12 matches, 2019–20

=== Points ===
- Most points in a season: 55 in 23 matches, 2024–25
- Fewest points in a season: 13 in 12 matches, 2020–21

=== Attendances ===
This section applies to attendances at AAMI Park; the home ground of the men's team, and grounds located in Casey; around their home base at Cranbourne East.

- Highest attendance at AAMI Park: 7,896, against Adelaide United, A-League Women, 18 December 2021
- Lowest attendance at AAMI Park: 595, against Adelaide United, A-League Women, 29 January 2023
- Highest attendance at Casey: 1,565, against Melbourne Victory, ctrl:cyber Pitch, A-League Women, 1 February 2025
- Lowest attendance at Casey: 247, against Western Sydney Wanderers, Casey Fields, A-League Women, 21 January 2023
