= 2017–18 Melbourne City FC (women) season =

Melbourne City W-League
2017–18 season
- Manager: Patrick Kisnorbo
- Stadium: CB Smith Reserve, Melbourne; AAMI Park, Melbourne
- W-League: 4th
- W-League finals series: Champions
- Top goalscorer: League: Jess Fishlock (5 goals); All: Jess Fishlock (7 goals)
- Highest home attendance: 3,510 vs. Melbourne Victory; 3 November 2017
- Lowest home attendance: 426 vs. Adelaide United; 3 December 2017
- Average home league attendance: 1,982
Home colours	Away colours

The 2017–18 Melbourne City FC W-League season was the club's third season in the W-League, the premier competition for women's soccer in Australia. The team was based at the City Football Academy at La Trobe University and played home games at both AAMI Park and CB Smith Reserve. The club was managed by former Melbourne City men's player Patrick Kisnorbo who was the assistant coach in the previous season. Jess Fishlock, who was a player-coach in the previous season, returned to the club and was Kisnorbo's assistant coach.

== Players ==
=== Squad information ===
Melbourne City's Women squad for the 2017–18 W-League, updated 15 February 2018.

Note: Flags indicate national team as defined under FIFA eligibility rules; some limited exceptions apply. Players may hold more than one non-FIFA nationality.

No.	Pos.	Nation	Player
1	GK	AUS	Lydia Williams (on loan from Houston Dash)
2	DF	JPN	Yukari Kinga
3	DF	USA	Lauren Barnes (on loan from Seattle Reign FC)
4	FW	USA	Ashley Hatch (on loan from North Carolina Courage)
5	MF	AUS	Lia Muldeary
6	MF	AUS	Aivi Luik
7	DF	AUS	Steph Catley (Captain, on loan from Orlando Pride SC)
9	FW	AUS	Larissa Crummer
10	MF	WAL	Jess Fishlock (on loan from Seattle Reign FC)
11	MF	AUS	Rhali Dobson

No.	Pos.	Nation	Player
12	FW	ENG	Jodie Taylor (Guest player)
13	DF	NZL	Rebekah Stott
14	DF	AUS	Alanna Kennedy
15	MF	AUS	Amy Jackson
16	MF	AUS	Sofia Sakalis
17	FW	AUS	Kyah Simon
18	DF	AUS	Hayley Richmond
19	DF	AUS	Tyla-Jay Vlajnic
20	GK	AUS	Emily Shields
23	GK	AUS	Melissa Hudson (née Barbieri)
30	GK	AUS	Emily Kenshole

=== Transfers in ===
No.	Pos.	Nat.	Name	Age	Moving from	Type	Transfer window	Ends	Transfer fee	Source
11	MF	(Australia)	Rhali Dobson	25	Newcastle Jets	Transfer	Pre-season		Free	
18	DF	(Australia)	Hayley Richmond	18		Transfer	Pre-season		Free	
16	MF	(Australia)	Sofia Sakalis	15		Transfer	Pre-season		Free	
17	FW	(Australia)	Kyah Simon	26	Sydney FC	Transfer	Pre-season		Free	
14	DF	(Australia)	Alanna Kennedy	22	(United States) Orlando Pride	Loan	Pre-season		Free	
2	DF	(Japan)	Yukari Kinga	33	Canberra United	Transfer	Pre-season		Free	
4	FW	(United States)	Ashley Hatch	22	(United States) North Carolina Courage	Loan	Pre-season		Free	
30	GK	(Australia)	Emily Kenshole		(Australia) Galaxy United	Transfer	Pre-season		Free	
5	MF	(Australia)	Lia Muldeary	15		Transfer	Pre-season		Free	
23	GK	(Australia)	Melissa Hudson (née Barbieri)	37		Injury replacement	Mid-season		Free	
12	FW	(England)	Jodie Taylor	31	(England) Arsenal	Guest player	Mid-season	2018	Free	
6	MF	(Australia)	Aivi Luik	32	(Norway) Vålerenga	Transfer	Mid-season	2018	Free	

=== Transfers out ===
No.	Pos.	Nat.	Name	Age	Moving to	Type	Transfer window	Transfer fee	Source
2	DF	(Australia)	Teigen Allen	23	(Norway) Vålerenga		Pre-season	Free	
4	DF	(Australia)	Rachel Binning				Pre-season	Free	
5	DF	(Australia)	Laura Alleway	27	(United States) Orlando Pride		Pre-season	Free	
6	MF	(Australia)	Aivi Luik	32	(Norway) Vålerenga		Pre-season	Free	
11	MF	(United States)	Erika Tymrak	26	(United States) FC Kansas City	Loan return	Pre-season	Free	
12	DF	(Australia)	Olivia Ellis	18			Pre-season	Free	
14	FW	(Australia)	Melina Ayres	18	Melbourne Victory		Pre-season	Free	
16	FW	(United States)	Beverly Yanez	29	(United States) Seattle Reign FC	Loan return	Pre-season	Free	
17	FW	(Australia)	Marianna Tabain	25	Perth Glory		Pre-season	Free	
18	FW	(Australia)	Jacynta Galabadaarachchi	16			Pre-season	Free	
30	GK	(Australia)	Kelsey Quinn				Pre-season	Free	

=== Contract extensions ===
No.	Name	Position	Duration	Date	Notes
15	Amy Jackson	Midfielder	1 year	11 September 2017	
19	Tyla-Jay Vlajnic	Defender	1 year	11 September 2017	
10	(Wales) Jess Fishlock	Central midfielder	1 year	17 October 2017	
1	Lydia Williams	Goalkeeper	1 year	19 October 2017	
3	(United States) Lauren Barnes	Defender	1 year	19 October 2017	
9	Larissa Crummer	Forward	1 year	19 October 2017	
13	(New Zealand) Rebekah Stott	Defender	1 year	19 October 2017	
7	Steph Catley	Defender	1 year	21 October 2017	
20	Emily Shields	Goalkeeper		25 October 2017	

== Managerial staff ==
Position	Name
Head coach	(Australia) Patrick Kisnorbo
Assistant coach	(Wales) Jess Fishlock
Team manager	(Australia) Louisa Bisby

== Squad statistics ==
N	Pos.	Nat.	Name	Total					W-League					W-League finals series
N	Pos.	Nat.	Name	Apps	Goals	Yellow card	Second yellow card	Red card	Apps	Goals	Yellow card	Second yellow card	Red card	Apps	Goals	Yellow card	Second yellow card	Red card
1	GK	(Australia)	Lydia Williams	12	0	0	0	0	10+0	0	0	0	0	2+0	0	0	0	0
2	DF	(Japan)	Yukari Kinga	14	2	2	0	0	12+0	2	2	0	0	2+0	0	0	0	0
3	DF	(United States)	Lauren Barnes	14	0	1	0	0	12+0	0	1	0	0	2+0	0	0	0	0
4	FW	(United States)	Ashley Hatch	14	2	0	0	0	11+1	2	0	0	0	2+0	0	0	0	0
5	MF	(Australia)	Lia Muldeary	1	0	0	0	0	0+1	0	0	0	0	0+0	0	0	0	0
6	MF	(Australia)	Aivi Luik	9	2	1	0	0	7+0	1	1	0	0	2+0	1	0	0	0
7	DF	(Australia)	Steph Catley	14	0	0	0	0	12+0	0	0	0	0	2+0	0	0	0	0
9	FW	(Australia)	Larissa Crummer	8	3	0	0	0	5+3	3	0	0	0	0+0	0	0	0	0
10	MF	(Wales)	Jess Fishlock	13	7	1	0	0	11+0	5	1	0	0	2+0	2	0	0	0
11	MF	(Australia)	Rhali Dobson	13	1	0	0	0	5+6	0	0	0	0	0+2	1	0	0	0
12	FW	(England)	Jodie Taylor	6	1	0	0	0	1+3	1	0	0	0	2+0	0	0	0	0
13	DF	(New Zealand)	Rebekah Stott	14	1	0	0	0	12+0	1	0	0	0	2+0	0	0	0	0
14	DF	(Australia)	Alanna Kennedy	14	1	1	0	0	12+0	1	0	0	0	2+0	0	1	0	0
15	MF	(Australia)	Amy Jackson	10	0	2	0	0	5+3	0	1	0	0	0+2	0	1	0	0
16	MF	(Australia)	Sofia Sakalis	1	0	0	0	0	0+1	0	0	0	0	0+0	0	0	0	0
17	FW	(Australia)	Kyah Simon	14	2	2	0	0	12+0	2	2	0	0	2+0	0	0	0	0
18	DF	(Australia)	Hayley Richmond	0	0	0	0	0	0+0	0	0	0	0	0+0	0	0	0	0
19	DF	(Australia)	Tyla-Jay Vlajnic	7	1	1	0	0	3+2	1	1	0	0	0+2	0	0	0	0
20	GK	(Australia)	Emily Shields	0	0	0	0	0	0+0	0	0	0	0	0+0	0	0	0	0
23	GK	(Australia)	Melissa Hudson (née Barbieri)	1	0	0	0	0	1+0	0	0	0	0	0+0	0	0	0	0
30	GK	(Australia)	Emily Kenshole	0	0	0	0	0	0+0	0	0	0	0	0+0	0	0	0	0

- Source: Competitive Matches
- (yellow card) = Number of bookings; (second yellow card) = Number of sending offs after a second yellow card; (red card) = Number of sending offs by a direct red card.

== Competitions ==
=== W-League ===
==== League table ====
Pos	Team	Pld	W	D	L	GF	GA	GD	Pts	Qualification
1	Brisbane Roar	12	9	1	2	21	12	+9	28	Qualification to Finals series
2	Sydney FC	12	8	1	3	26	16	+10	25	Qualification to Finals series
3	Newcastle Jets	12	6	2	4	26	21	+5	20	Qualification to Finals series
4	Melbourne City (C)	12	6	2	4	20	15	+5	20	Qualification to Finals series
5	Canberra United	12	5	1	6	24	27	−3	16	
6	Perth Glory	12	4	2	6	25	27	−2	14	
7	Melbourne Victory	12	3	2	7	15	19	−4	11	
8	Western Sydney Wanderers	12	3	2	7	13	21	−8	11	
9	Adelaide United	12	3	1	8	15	27	−12	10	

Source: A-Leagues
Rules for classification: 1) points; 2) goal difference; 3) number of goals scored.
(C) Champions

==== Results summary ====
Overall								Home						Away					
Pld	W	D	L	GF	GA	GD	Pts	W	D	L	GF	GA	GD	W	D	L	GF	GA	GD
12	6	2	4	20	15	+5	20	4	2	0	12	4	+8	2	0	4	8	11	−3

Source: Competitive Matches

==== Results by round ====
Round	1	2	3	4	5	6	7	8	9	10	11	12	13	14
Ground	A	H	H	A	B	H	H	A	A	H	A	H	B	A
Result	L	W	W	L	✖	D	W	L	W	W	L	D	✖	W
Position	9	6	2	4	5	5	4	5	5	4	4	4	4	4

Source: Competitive Matches
A = Away; H = Home; B = Bye; W = Win; D = Draw; L = Loss

==== Matches ====
Win Draw Loss

27 October 2017 1	Perth Glory	4–1	Melbourne City	Perth
19:00 AWST	Kerr 4'; Hill 74', 90+3'; Bolger 83'	Report	Simon 48'	Stadium: nib Stadium; Attendance: 1,308; Referee: Rachel Mitchenson

3 November 2017 2	Melbourne City	1–0	Melbourne Victory	Melbourne
17:20 AEDT	Stott 82'	Report		Stadium: AAMI Park; Attendance: 3,510; Referee: Kate Jacewicz

12 November 2017 3	Melbourne City	5–2	Newcastle Jets	Melbourne
16:30 AEDT	Simon 5'; Crummer 45', 71'; Fishlock 54', 77'	Report	Stengel 16', 20'	Stadium: AAMI Park; Attendance: 1,773; Referee: Rebecca Durcau

18 November 2017 4	Sydney FC	3–2	Melbourne City	Sydney
17:00 AEDT	Ledbrook 45+2'; Polias 64'; Siemsen 90+1'	Report	Ralston 46' (o.g.); Crummer 53'	Stadium: Allianz Stadium; Attendance: 2,115; Referee: Lara Lee

3 December 2017 6	Melbourne City	1–1	Adelaide United	Melbourne
17:00 AEDT	Hatch 14'	Report	Mautz 73'	Stadium: Lakeside Stadium; Attendance: 426; Referee: Kate Jacewicz

10 December 2017 7	Melbourne City	2–1	Canberra United	Melbourne
16:30 AEDT	Fishlock 20', 80'	Report	Heyman 23'	Stadium: AAMI Park; Attendance: 2,504; Referee: Rebecca Durcau

17 December 2017 8	Brisbane Roar	2–0	Melbourne City	Brisbane
15:30 AEST	Toby 62'; Gorry 72'	Report		Stadium: Suncorp Stadium; Attendance: 3,204; Referee: Lara Lee

1 January 2018 9	Western Sydney Wanderers	0–1	Melbourne City	Sydney
17:20 AEDT		Report	Fishlock 90+2'	Stadium: ANZ Stadium; Attendance: 4,178; Referee: Kate Jacewicz

7 January 2018 10	Melbourne City	3–0	Perth Glory	Melbourne
16:30 AEDT	Hatch 25'; Vlajnic 35'; Kinga 43'	Report		Stadium: City Football Academy; Attendance: 508; Referee: Casey Reibelt

14 January 2018 11	Melbourne Victory	2–1	Melbourne City	Melbourne
16:30 AEDT	Ayres 71'; Gibbons 86'	Report	Luik 63'	Stadium: Epping Stadium; Attendance: 1,143; Referee: Lara Lee

21 January 2018 12	Melbourne City	0–0	Brisbane Roar	Melbourne
16:30 AEDT		Report		Stadium: AAMI Park; Attendance: 3,170; Referee: Rachel Mitchenson

3 February 2018 14	Newcastle Jets	0–3	Melbourne City	Newcastle
20:15 AEDT		Report	Taylor 29'; Luik 33'; Kinga 46'	Stadium: McDonald Jones Stadium; Attendance: 3,000; Referee: Kate Jacewicz

==== Finals series ====
11 February 2018 Semi-final	Brisbane Roar	0–2	Melbourne City	Brisbane
17:00 AEST		Report	Luik 66'; Fishlock 72'	Stadium: Perry Park; Attendance: 3,870; Referee: Rebecca Durcau

18 February 2018 Grand final	Sydney FC	0–2	Melbourne City	Sydney
17:00 AEDT		Report	Fishlock 35'; Taylor 75'	Stadium: Allianz Stadium; Attendance: 6,025; Referee: Rebecca Durcau

== See also ==
- 2017–18 Melbourne City FC season
