= 2015–16 Melbourne City FC (women) season =

Melbourne City W-League
2015–16 season
- Manager: Joe Montemurro
- Stadium: CB Smith Reserve
- W-League: Premiers
- W-League finals series: Champions
- Top goalscorer: League: Larissa Crummer (11 goals); All: Larissa Crummer (11 goals)
Home colours	Away colours

The 2015–16 Melbourne City FC W-League season was the club's inaugural season in the W-League, following the announcement of the team's formation on 13 May 2015. The team was based at the City Football Academy, training on the Academy Pitches at La Trobe University and played home games at both AAMI Park and CB Smith Reserve.

The club won all 12 of its regular season games and won the 2016 W-League grand final, to claim both a maiden regular season premiership and an end of season championship.

== Players ==
=== Squad information ===
Correct as of 30 October 2015

Note: Flags indicate national team as defined under FIFA eligibility rules; some limited exceptions apply. Players may hold more than one non-FIFA nationality.

No.	Pos.	Nation	Player
1	GK	AUS	Brianna Davey
2	MF	AUS	Monique Iannella
3	MF	AUS	Alex Chidiac
4	DF	SCO	Jen Beattie (on loan from Manchester City)
5	DF	AUS	Laura Alleway
6	MF	AUS	Aivi Luik
7	DF	AUS	Steph Catley
8	MF	SCO	Kim Little (on loan from Seattle Reign FC)
9	FW	AUS	Larissa Crummer
10	MF	WAL	Jess Fishlock (on loan from Seattle Reign FC)
11	FW	AUS	Lisa De Vanna (Captain)

No.	Pos.	Nation	Player
12	DF	AUS	Olivia Ellis
13	DF	NZL	Rebekah Stott
14	FW	AUS	Melina Ayres
15	MF	AUS	Amy Jackson
16	MF	AUS	Beattie Goad
17	FW	AUS	Marianna Tabain
18	FW	MEX	Anisa Guajardo
20	GK	AUS	Trudy Burke
30	GK	AUS	Kelsey Quinn
36	GK	AUS	Erin Herd

=== Transfers in ===
No.	Pos.	Nat.	Name	Age	Moving from	Type	Transfer window	Ends	Transfer fee	Source
11	FW	(Australia)	Lisa De Vanna	30	(Australia) Melbourne Victory	Transfer	Pre-season		Free	
5	DF	(Australia)	Laura Alleway	25	(Australia) Brisbane Roar	Transfer	Pre-season		Free	
1	GK	(Australia)	Brianna Davey	20	(Australia) Melbourne Victory	Transfer	Pre-season		Free	
3	FW	(Australia)	Alex Chidiac	16	(Australia) Adelaide United	Transfer	Pre-season		Free	
9	FW	(Australia)	Larissa Crummer	19	(Australia) Brisbane Roar	Transfer	Pre-season		Free	
16	FW	(Australia)	Beattie Goad	18	(Australia) Melbourne Victory	Transfer	Pre-season		Free	
2	FW	(Australia)	Monique Iannella	19	(Australia) Adelaide United	Transfer	Pre-season		Free	
13	DF	(New Zealand)	Rebekah Stott	22	(Germany) SC Sand	Transfer	Pre-season			
17	FW	(Australia)	Marianna Tabain	22	(Australia) Perth Glory	Transfer	Pre-season		Free	
20	GK	(Australia)	Trudy Burke	24	(Australia) Western Sydney Wanderers	Transfer	Pre-season		Free	
7	DF	(Australia)	Steph Catley	21	(United States) Portland Thorns	Transfer	Pre-season		Free	
15	MF	(Australia)	Amy Jackson	28	(Australia) Melbourne Victory	Transfer	Pre-season		Free	
6	MF	(Australia)	Aivi Luik	30	(Iceland) Fylkir	Transfer	Pre-season		Free	
10	MF	(Wales)	Jess Fishlock	28	(United States) Seattle Reign FC	Loan	Pre-season		Free	
8	MF	(Scotland)	Kim Little	25	(United States) Seattle Reign FC	Loan	Pre-season		Free	
14	FW	(Australia)	Melina Ayres	16	(Australia) Ashburton United	Transfer	Pre-season		Free	
12	DF	(Australia)	Olivia Ellis	16	(Australia) Boroondara Eagles	Transfer	Pre-season		Free	
18	FW	(Mexico)	Anisa Guajardo	24	(Australia) Heidelberg United	Transfer	Pre-season		Free	
25	MF	(Australia)	Tessa Sernio		(Australia) Bulleen Lions	Transfer	Pre-season		Free	
22	DF	(Australia)	Hannah Brewer	22	(Australia) Valentine Phoenix	Transfer	Round 2		Free	
23	DF	(Australia)	Tyla-Jay Vlajnic		(Australia) Bundoora United	Transfer	Round 2		Free	
24	FW	(Australia)	Racheal Quigley	24	(Australia) Bulleen Lions	Transfer	Round 2		Free	
30	GK	(Australia)	Kelsey Quinn		(Australia) South Melbourne	Transfer	Round 2		Free	
4	DF	(Scotland)	Jen Beattie	24	(England) Manchester City	Loan	Round 3		Free	
36	GK	(Australia)	Erin Herd			Transfer	Round 3		Free	

=== Transfers out ===
No.	Pos.	Nat.	Name	Age	Moving to	Type	Transfer window	Transfer fee	Source
22	DF	(Australia)	Hannah Brewer	22		End of contract	Round 3	Free	
23	DF	(Australia)	Tyla-Jay Vlajnic			End of contract	Round 3	Free	
24	FW	(Australia)	Racheal Quigley	24		End of contract	Round 3	Free	
25	MF	(Australia)	Tessa Sernio			End of contract	Round 3	Free	

== Managerial staff ==
Position	Name
Head coach	(Australia) Joe Montemurro
Assistant coach	(Wales) Jess Fishlock
Team manager	(Australia) Louisa Bisby

== Squad statistics ==
N	Pos.	Nat.	Name	Total					W-League					Finals series
N	Pos.	Nat.	Name	Apps	Goals	Yellow card	Second yellow card	Red card	Apps	Goals	Yellow card	Second yellow card	Red card	Apps	Goals	Yellow card	Second yellow card	Red card
1	GK	(Australia)	Brianna Davey	7	0	0	0	0	5+0	0	0	0	0	2+0	0	0	0	0
2	MF	(Australia)	Monique Iannella	0	0	0	0	0	0+0	0	0	0	0	0+0	0	0	0	0
3	MF	(Australia)	Alex Chidiac	10	0	0	0	0	3+6	0	0	0	0	0+1	0	0	0	0
4	DF	(Scotland)	Jen Beattie	12	2	1	0	0	9+1	1	0	0	0	2+0	1	1	0	0
5	DF	(Australia)	Laura Alleway	11	0	0	0	0	7+2	0	0	0	0	2+0	0	0	0	0
6	MF	(Australia)	Aivi Luik	14	2	1	0	0	12+0	2	1	0	0	2+0	0	0	0	0
7	DF	(Australia)	Steph Catley	13	0	1	0	0	11+0	0	1	0	0	2+0	0	0	0	0
8	MF	(Scotland)	Kim Little	12	9	0	0	0	9+1	8	0	0	0	2+0	1	0	0	0
9	FW	(Australia)	Larissa Crummer	12	11	0	0	0	10+0	11	0	0	0	2+0	0	0	0	0
10	MF	(Wales)	Jess Fishlock	11	2	1	0	0	9+0	2	1	0	0	2+0	0	0	0	0
11	FW	(Australia)	Lisa De Vanna	9	3	0	0	1	7+0	2	0	0	1	1+1	1	0	0	0
12	DF	(Australia)	Olivia Ellis	2	0	0	0	0	0+2	0	0	0	0	0+0	0	0	0	0
13	DF	(New Zealand)	Rebekah Stott	13	0	0	0	0	11+1	0	0	0	0	1+0	0	0	0	0
14	FW	(Australia)	Melina Ayres	4	1	0	0	0	0+4	1	0	0	0	0+0	0	0	0	0
15	MF	(Australia)	Amy Jackson	14	0	0	0	0	10+2	0	0	0	0	1+1	0	0	0	0
16	MF	(Australia)	Beattie Goad	14	4	0	0	0	8+4	3	0	0	0	2+0	1	0	0	0
17	FW	(Australia)	Marianna Tabain	14	7	0	0	0	9+3	7	0	0	0	1+1	0	0	0	0
18	FW	(Mexico)	Anisa Guajardo	7	0	2	0	0	2+5	0	2	0	0	0+0	0	0	0	0
20	GK	(Australia)	Trudy Burke	7	0	0	0	0	7+0	0	0	0	0	0+0	0	0	0	0
30	GK	(Australia)	Kelsey Quinn	1	0	0	0	0	1+0	0	0	0	0	0+0	0	0	0	0
36	GK	(Australia)	Erin Herd	0	0	0	0	0	0+0	0	0	0	0	0+0	0	0	0	0
Players no longer at the club:
22	DF	(Australia)	Hannah Brewer	1	0	0	0	0	1+0	0	0	0	0	0+0	0	0	0	0
23	DF	(Australia)	Tyla-Jay Vlajnic	1	0	0	0	0	1+0	0	0	0	0	0+0	0	0	0	0
24	FW	(Australia)	Racheal Quigley	1	0	0	0	0	1+0	0	0	0	0	0+0	0	0	0	0
25	MF	(Australia)	Tessa Sernio	1	0	0	0	0	0+1	0	0	0	0	0+0	0	0	0	0

- Last updated: 31 January 2016
- (yellow card) = Number of bookings; (second yellow card) = Number of sending offs after a second yellow card; (red card) = Number of sending offs by a direct red card.

== Competitions ==
=== W-League ===
==== League table ====
Pos	Team	Pld	W	D	L	GF	GA	GD	Pts	Qualification
1	Melbourne City (C)	12	12	0	0	38	4	+34	36	Qualification to Finals series
2	Canberra United	12	8	2	2	26	8	+18	26	Qualification to Finals series
3	Sydney FC	12	6	1	5	15	21	−6	19	Qualification to Finals series
4	Brisbane Roar	12	5	1	6	16	17	−1	16	Qualification to Finals series
5	Adelaide United	12	3	4	5	18	19	−1	13	
6	Newcastle Jets	12	3	4	5	9	12	−3	13	
7	Western Sydney Wanderers	12	3	3	6	15	25	−10	12	
8	Perth Glory	12	3	2	7	10	23	−13	11	
9	Melbourne Victory	12	2	1	9	10	28	−18	7	

Source: A-Leagues
Rules for classification: 1) points; 2) goal difference; 3) number of goals scored.
(C) Champions

==== Results summary ====
Overall								Home						Away					
Pld	W	D	L	GF	GA	GD	Pts	W	D	L	GF	GA	GD	W	D	L	GF	GA	GD
12	12	0	0	38	4	+34	36	6	0	0	18	2	+16	6	0	0	20	2	+18

Last updated: 16 January 2016.
Source: Competitive Matches

==== Results by round ====
Round	1	2	3	4	5	6	7	8	9	10	11	12	13	14
Ground	A	H	A	A	H	H	B	A	A	H	A	H	B	H
Result	W	W	W	W	W	W	✖	W	W	W	W	W	✖	W
Position	1	1	1	1	1	1	1	1	1	1	1	1	1	1

Updated to match(es) played on 16 January 2016. Source: Competitive Matches
A = Away; H = Home; B = Bye; W = Win; D = Draw; L = Loss

==== Matches ====
18 October 2015 1	Sydney FC	0–6	Melbourne City	Sydney
17:30 AEDT		Report	Crummer 11', 45'; De Vanna 39'; Goad 43'; Tabain 61'; Ayres 89'	Stadium: Lambert Park; Attendance: 960; Referee: Katie Patterson

25 October 2015 2	Melbourne City	2–1	Melbourne Victory	Melbourne
14:00 AEDT	Tabain 48'; Luik 72' (pen.)	Report	Knight 90+2'	Stadium: AAMI Park; Attendance: 2,311; Referee: Casey Reibelt

31 October 2015 3	Perth Glory	0–4	Melbourne City	Perth
19:00 AEDT		Report	Tabain 12'; De Vanna 21'; Crummer 52', 64'	Stadium: Ashfield Reserve; Attendance: 483; Referee: Kelly Jones

8 November 2015 4	Canberra United	2–4	Melbourne City	Gosford
14:00 AEDT	Sykes 29'; Heyman 60'	Report	Tabain 5'; Crummer 11'; Luik 41'; De Vanna (red card) 57'; Little 87'	Stadium: Central Coast Stadium; Attendance: 1,233; Referee: Lara Lee

14 November 2015 5	Melbourne City	2–0	Adelaide United	Melbourne
16:00 AEDT	Crummer 43'; Fishlock 71'	Report		Stadium: CB Smith Reserve; Referee: Rebecca Durcau

22 November 2015 6	Melbourne City	4–0	Brisbane Roar	Melbourne
14:00 AEDT	Little 54', 61'; Crummer 79', 81'	Report	Blackburn (red card) 50'	Stadium: CB Smith Reserve; Attendance: 494; Referee: Kate Jacewicz

6 December 2015 8	Melbourne Victory	0–4	Melbourne City	Melbourne
15:00 AEDT		Report	Beattie 35'; Crummer 52', 72'; Little 79'	Stadium: David Barro Stadium; Attendance: 753; Referee: Lara Lee

13 December 2015 9	Newcastle Jets	0–1	Melbourne City	Newcastle
14:00 AEDT		Report	Goad 44'	Stadium: Hunter Stadium; Attendance: 3,292; Referee: Rachel Mitchenson

20 December 2015 10	Melbourne City	4–0	Perth Glory	Melbourne
16:00 AEDT	Little 63'; Tabain 68'; Crummer 83'; Fishlock 90+3'	Report		Stadium: CB Smith Reserve; Attendance: 453; Referee: Casey Reibelt

28 December 2015 11	Brisbane Roar	0–1	Melbourne City	Gold Coast
16:00 AEDT		Report	Little 6'	Stadium: Pizzey Park; Attendance: 1,672; Referee: Kelly Jones

3 January 2016 12	Melbourne City	4–0	Western Sydney Wanderers	Melbourne
14:00 AEDT	Little 12', 33' (pen.); Goad 67'; Tabain 70'	Report		Stadium: CB Smith Reserve; Referee: Rachel Mitchenson

16 January 2016 14	Melbourne City	2–1	Sydney FC	Melbourne
14:00 AEDT	Kennedy 52' (o.g.); Tabain 85'	Report	Ibini 71'	Stadium: CB Smith Reserve; Attendance: 602; Referee: Katie Patterson

==== Finals series ====
25 January 2016 Semi-final	Melbourne City	0–0 (a.e.t.) (5–4 p)	Brisbane Roar	Melbourne
16:30 AEDT		Report		Stadium: AAMI Park; Attendance: 4,941; Referee: Rebecca Durcau
	Penalties
	Beattie (penalty scored); Alleway (penalty scored); Little (penalty scored); Catley (penalty scored); De Vanna (penalty scored)		(penalty scored) Polkinghorne; (penalty scored) Butt; (penalty scored) Gielnik; (penalty scored) Chapman; (penalty missed) A. Beard

31 January 2016 Grand final	Melbourne City	4–1	Sydney FC	Melbourne
14:00 AEDT	Beattie 32'; Little 54'; Goad 80'; De Vanna 90+5'	Report	K. Simon 69' (pen.)	Stadium: AAMI Park; Attendance: 4,206; Referee: Kate Jacewicz

== Post-season friendly ==
=== Fatima Bint Mubarak Ladies Sports Academy Challenge ===
17 February 2016 Friendly	Manchester City (England)	3–0	(Australia) Melbourne City	Abu Dhabi
18:00 GST	Houghton 34', 75'; Christiansen 50'	Report		Stadium: New York University Abu Dhabi; Attendance: 500

== See also ==
- 2015–16 Melbourne City FC season
