= 2016–17 Melbourne City FC (women) season =

Melbourne City W-League
2016–17 season
- Manager: Joe Montemurro
- Stadium: CB Smith Reserve, Melbourne; AAMI Park, Melbourne
- W-League: 4th
- W-League finals series: Champions
- Top goalscorer: League: Jess Fishlock (6 goals); All: Jess Fishlock (8 goals)
- Highest home attendance: 1,943 vs Melbourne Victory
- Lowest home attendance: 478 vs Brisbane Roar
- Average home league attendance: 1,045
Home colours	Away colours

The 2016–17 Melbourne City FC W-League season was the club's second season in the W-League, the premier competition for women's soccer in Australia. The team was based at the City Football Academy at La Trobe University and played home games at both AAMI Park and CB Smith Reserve. The club was again by coached by manager Joe Montemurro, until he was promoted to assistant manager of the senior men's team in January 2017; his role as manager was replaced by captain Jess Fishlock, who acted as captain/coach for the remainder of the season.

Melbourne City finished fourth in the league, qualifying for the finals series. They defeated Perth Glory in the 2017 W-League grand final to claim their second consecutive W-League championship.

== Players ==
=== Squad information ===
Note: Flags indicate national team as defined under FIFA eligibility rules; some limited exceptions apply. Players may hold more than one non-FIFA nationality.

No.	Pos.	Nation	Player
1	GK	AUS	Lydia Williams (on loan from Houston Dash)
2	DF	AUS	Teigen Allen
3	DF	USA	Lauren Barnes (on loan from Seattle Reign FC)
4	DF	AUS	Rachel Binning
5	DF	AUS	Laura Alleway
6	MF	AUS	Aivi Luik
7	DF	AUS	Steph Catley (Captain)
9	FW	AUS	Larissa Crummer
10	MF	WAL	Jess Fishlock (Player-coach, on loan from Seattle Reign FC)
11	MF	USA	Erika Tymrak (on loan from FC Kansas City)

No.	Pos.	Nation	Player
12	DF	AUS	Olivia Ellis
13	DF	NZL	Rebekah Stott
14	FW	AUS	Melina Ayres
15	MF	AUS	Amy Jackson
16	FW	USA	Beverly Yanez (on loan from Seattle Reign FC)
17	FW	AUS	Marianna Tabain
18	FW	AUS	Jacynta Galabadaarachchi
19	DF	AUS	Tyla-Jay Vlajnic
20	GK	AUS	Emily Shields
30	GK	AUS	Kelsey Quinn

=== Transfers in ===
No.	Pos.	Nat.	Name	Age	Moving from	Type	Transfer window	Ends	Transfer fee	Source
2	DF	(Australia)	Teigen Allen	22	Sydney FC	Transfer	Pre-season		Free	
18	FW	(Australia)	Jacinta Galabadaarachchi	15		Transfer	Pre-season		Free	
1	GK	(Australia)	Lydia Williams	28	(United States) Houston Dash	Loan	Pre-season	2017	Free	
3	DF	(United States)	Lauren Barnes	27	(United States) Seattle Reign FC	Loan	Pre-season	2017	Free	
11	MF	(United States)	Erika Tymrak	25	(United States) FC Kansas City	Loan	Pre-season	2017	Free	
4	DF	(Australia)	Rachel Binning				Pre-season		Free	
16	FW	(United States)	Beverly Yanez	28	(United States) Seattle Reign FC	Loan	Mid-season	2017	Free	

=== Transfers out ===
No.	Pos.	Nat.	Name	Age	Moving to	Type	Transfer window	Transfer fee	Source
1	GK	(Australia)	Brianna Davey	21	Carlton (AFLW)		Pre-season	Free	
2	MF	(Australia)	Monique Iannella	20	(United States) Texas Longhorns		Pre-season	Free	
3	MF	(Australia)	Alex Chidiac	17	Adelaide United		Pre-season	Free	
4	DF	(Scotland)	Jen Beattie	25	(England) Manchester City	Loan return	Pre-season	Free	
8	MF	(Scotland)	Kim Little	26	(United States) Seattle Reign FC	Loan return	Pre-season	Free	
11	FW	(Australia)	Lisa De Vanna	31	(United States) Orlando Pride		Pre-season	Free	
16	MF	(Australia)	Beattie Goad	18	(United States) Stanford University		Pre-season	Free	
18	FW	(Mexico)	Anisa Guajardo	25			Pre-season	Free	
20	GK	(Australia)	Trudy Burke	25	Canberra United		Pre-season	Free	

== Managerial staff ==
Position	Name
Head coach	(Wales) Jess Fishlock
Team manager	(Australia) Louisa Bisby
Assistant coach	(Australia) Patrick Kisnorbo

== Squad statistics ==
N	Pos.	Nat.	Name	Total					W-League					Finals series
N	Pos.	Nat.	Name	Apps	Goals	Yellow card	Second yellow card	Red card	Apps	Goals	Yellow card	Second yellow card	Red card	Apps	Goals	Yellow card	Second yellow card	Red card
1	GK	(Australia)	Lydia Williams	14	0	0	0	0	12+0	0	0	0	0	2+0	0	0	0	0
2	DF	(Australia)	Teigen Allen	13	0	0	0	0	9+2	0	0	0	0	2+0	0	0	0	0
3	DF	(United States)	Lauren Barnes	12	0	2	1	0	10+0	0	1	1	0	2+0	0	1	0	0
4	DF	(Australia)	Rachel Binning	0	0	0	0	0	0+0	0	0	0	0	0+0	0	0	0	0
5	DF	(Australia)	Laura Alleway	14	1	0	0	0	12+0	1	0	0	0	2+0	0	0	0	0
6	MF	(Australia)	Aivi Luik	14	1	3	0	0	11+1	1	3	0	0	2+0	0	0	0	0
7	DF	(Australia)	Steph Catley	14	1	0	0	0	12+0	1	0	0	0	2+0	0	0	0	0
9	FW	(Australia)	Larissa Crummer	3	0	0	0	0	2+1	0	0	0	0	0+0	0	0	0	0
10	MF	(Wales)	Jess Fishlock	14	8	0	0	0	12+0	6	0	0	0	2+0	2	0	0	0
11	MF	(United States)	Erika Tymrak	14	2	0	0	0	8+4	2	0	0	0	2+0	0	0	0	0
12	DF	(Australia)	Olivia Ellis	0	0	0	0	0	0+0	0	0	0	0	0+0	0	0	0	0
13	DF	(New Zealand)	Rebekah Stott	14	2	0	0	0	12+0	2	0	0	0	2+0	0	0	0	0
14	FW	(Australia)	Melina Ayres	12	1	0	0	0	4+6	1	0	0	0	0+2	0	0	0	0
15	MF	(Australia)	Amy Jackson	12	1	0	0	0	8+2	1	0	0	0	0+2	0	0	0	0
16	FW	(United States)	Beverly Yanez	10	2	1	0	0	7+1	1	1	0	0	2+0	1	0	0	0
17	FW	(Australia)	Marianna Tabain	13	3	1	0	0	9+2	3	0	0	0	2+0	0	1	0	0
18	FW	(Australia)	Jacynta Galabadaarachchi	5	0	0	0	0	1+4	0	0	0	0	0+0	0	0	0	0
19	DF	(Australia)	Tyla-Jay Vlajnic	9	0	0	0	0	2+6	0	0	0	0	0+1	0	0	0	0
20	GK	(Australia)	Emily Shields	0	0	0	0	0	0+0	0	0	0	0	0+0	0	0	0	0
30	GK	(Australia)	Kelsey Quinn	0	0	0	0	0	0+0	0	0	0	0	0+0	0	0	0	0

- Last updated: 12 February 2017
- (yellow card) = Number of bookings; (second yellow card) = Number of sending offs after a second yellow card; (red card) = Number of sending offs by a direct red card.

== Competitions ==
=== W-League ===
==== League table ====
Pos	Team	Pld	W	D	L	GF	GA	GD	Pts	Qualification
1	Canberra United	12	7	2	3	33	21	+12	23	Qualification to Finals series
2	Perth Glory	12	7	2	3	22	18	+4	23	Qualification to Finals series
3	Sydney FC	12	7	1	4	22	16	+6	22	Qualification to Finals series
4	Melbourne City (C)	12	6	2	4	19	14	+5	20	Qualification to Finals series
5	Newcastle Jets	12	4	3	5	18	18	0	15	
6	Adelaide United	12	3	5	4	31	26	+5	14	
7	Brisbane Roar	12	4	1	7	15	21	−6	13	
8	Western Sydney Wanderers	12	4	1	7	14	29	−15	13	
9	Melbourne Victory	12	2	3	7	17	28	−11	9	

Source: A-Leagues
Rules for classification: 1) points; 2) goal difference; 3) number of goals scored.
(C) Champions

==== Results summary ====
Overall								Home						Away					
Pld	W	D	L	GF	GA	GD	Pts	W	D	L	GF	GA	GD	W	D	L	GF	GA	GD
12	6	2	4	19	14	+5	20	3	1	2	11	7	+4	3	1	2	8	7	+1

Last updated: 27 January 2017.
Source: Competitive Matches

==== Results by round ====
Round	1	2	3	4	5	6	7	8	9	10	11	12	13	14
Ground	H	A	B	H	A	H	A	H	B	H	A	A	H	A
Result	W	W	✖	W	W	L	L	L	✖	D	D	L	W	W
Position	3	1	3	1	1	1	3	4	4	4	4	4	4	4

Updated to match(es) played on 29 January 2017. Source: Competitive Matches
A = Away; H = Home; B = Bye; W = Win; D = Draw; L = Loss

==== Matches ====
6 November 2016 1	Melbourne City	1–0	Newcastle Jets	Melbourne
15:00 AEDT	Tabain 8'	Report		Stadium: CB Smith Reserve; Attendance: 633; Referee: Kate Jacewicz

12 November 2016 2	Canberra United	1–2	Melbourne City	Canberra
15:00 AEDT	Brush 90+4'	Report	Alleway 18'; Ayres 80'	Stadium: GIO Stadium; Attendance: 2,595; Referee: Rebecca Durcau

27 November 2016 4	Melbourne City	3–0	Melbourne Victory	Melbourne
14:30 AEDT	Fishlock 64', 77'; Catley 75'	Report		Stadium: AAMI Park; Attendance: 1,943; Referee: Katie Patterson

4 December 2016 5	Brisbane Roar	1–2	Melbourne City	Kippa-Ring
16:00 AEST	Gorry 2'	Report	Fishlock 6'; Tymrak 25'	Stadium: A.J. Kelly Park; Attendance: 1,327; Referee: Kate Jacewicz

10 December 2016 6	Melbourne City	1–2	Canberra United	Melbourne
17:00 AEDT	Yanez 53'	Report	McCormick 49'; Roestbakken 82'	Stadium: CB Smith Reserve; Attendance: 605; Referee: Katie Patterson

18 December 2016 7	Western Sydney Wanderers	2–1	Melbourne City	Sydney
15:00 AEDT	Fletcher 18', 49' (pen.)	Report	Tabain 3'	Stadium: Popondetta Park; Attendance: 513; Referee: Maddison Kennedy

27 December 2016 8	Melbourne City	2–3	Perth Glory	Melbourne
17:20 AEDT	Fishlock 60'; Luik 72'	Report	Sutton 47'; Kerr 77', 84'	Stadium: AAMI Park; Attendance: 1,938; Referee: Casey Reibelt

2 January 2017 10	Melbourne City	1–1	Adelaide United	Melbourne
19:15 AEDT	Fishlock 26'	Report	Quigley 70'	Stadium: CB Smith Reserve; Attendance: 674; Referee: Kelly Jones

8 January 2017 11	Sydney FC	1–1	Melbourne City	Sydney
14:30 AEDT	Foord 67'	Report	Fishlock 75'	Stadium: Allianz Stadium; Attendance: 857; Referee: Rebecca Durcau

15 January 2017 12	Melbourne Victory	2–0	Melbourne City	Melbourne
16:00 AEDT	Dowie 1'; Nairn 31'	Report		Stadium: Epping Stadium; Attendance: 467; Referee: Katie Patterson

22 January 2017 13	Melbourne City	3–1	Brisbane Roar	Melbourne
17:00 AEDT	Tabain 18'; Stott 61', 90+2'	Report	Gorry 67'	Stadium: CB Smith Reserve; Attendance: 478; Referee: Lara Lee

27 January 2017 14	Newcastle Jets	0–2	Melbourne City	Coffs Harbour
17:20 AEDT		Report	Tymrak 56'; Jackson 90+3'	Stadium: C.ex Coffs International Stadium; Attendance: 3,570; Referee: Kate Jacewicz

Finals series

5 February 2017 Semi-finals	Canberra United	0–1 (a.e.t.)	Melbourne City	Canberra
19:30 AEDT		Report	Fishlock 107'	Stadium: GIO Stadium; Attendance: 5,072; Referee: Rebecca Durca

12 February 2017 Grand final	Perth Glory	0–2	Melbourne City	Perth
16:30 AWT		Report	Fishlock 45+1'; Yanez 72'	Stadium: nib Stadium; Attendance: 4,591; Referee: Kate Jacewicz
