= 2020 W-League grand final =

- Event: 2019–20 W-League
Melbourne City	Sydney FC
1	0
- Date: 21 March 2020
- Venue: AAMI Park, Melbourne
- Player of the Match: Steph Catley
- Referee: Rebecca Durcau
- Attendance: 0 (behind closed doors)

The 2020 W-League grand final was the final match of the 2019–20 W-League season to decide the champions of women's soccer in Australia for the season.

The match was played between Melbourne City and Sydney FC behind closed doors at AAMI Park in Melbourne, Victoria. Spectators were not permitted at the match due to the COVID-19 pandemic.

Melbourne City won the match and in so doing claimed their fourth W-League championship, the most of any club in the W-League. Steph Catley, the game's only goalscorer, was awarded player of the match.

== Teams ==
Team	Previous grand final appearances (bold indicates winners)
Melbourne City	3 (**2016**, **2017**, **2018**)
Sydney FC	6 (**2009 (Dec)**, 2011, **2013**, 2016, 2018, **2019**)

== Route to the final ==
Melbourne City		Round	Sydney FC	
1st place: Pos / Team / Pld / Pts; **1** / Melbourne City (C) / **12** / **34**; 2 / Melbourne Victory / 12 / **23**; 3 / Sydney FC / 12 / **22**; 4 / Western Sydney Wanderers / 12 / **22**; 5 / Brisbane Roar / 12 / **17**; Source: A-Leagues (C) Champions		Regular season	3rd place: Pos / Team / Pld / Pts; 1 / Melbourne City (C) / 12 / **34**; 2 / Melbourne Victory / 12 / **23**; **3** / Sydney FC / **12** / **22**; 4 / Western Sydney Wanderers / 12 / **22**; 5 / Brisbane Roar / 12 / **17**; Source: A-Leagues (C) Champions	
Opponent	Score		Opponent	Score
Western Sydney Wanderers	5–1 (H)	Semi-finals	Melbourne Victory	0–1 (A)

Semi-finals
1	**Melbourne City**	**5**
4	Western Sydney Wanderers	1
2	Melbourne Victory	0
3	**Sydney FC**	**1**

Grand Final
**Melbourne City**	**1**
Sydney FC	0

== Match details ==
21 March 2020
13:30 AEDT

Melbourne City	1–0	Sydney FC
Catley 15'	Report

AAMI Park, Melbourne
Attendance: 0 (behind closed doors)
Referee: Rebecca Durcau

**Melbourne City**	**Sydney FC**

GK	1	(Australia) Lydia Williams
DF	3	(United States) Lauren Barnes
DF	15	(Australia) Emma Checker
DF	13	(New Zealand) Rebekah Stott
MF	21	(Australia) Ellie Carpenter
MF	7	(Australia) Stephanie Catley (c)
MF	6	(Australia) Aivi Luik
MF	2	(Japan) Yukari Kinga (substituted off) 67'
FW	10	(Australia) Emily van Egmond
FW	9	(Scotland) Claire Emslie
FW	17	(Australia) Kyah Simon (substituted off) 85'
Substitutes:
GK	23	(Australia) Melissa Barbieri
MF	19	(Australia) Tyla-Jay Vlajnic
MF	20	(Serbia) Milica Mijatovic (substituted on) 67'
DF	11	(Australia) Rhali Dobson
FW	22	(United States) Ally Watt (substituted on) 85'
Manager:
(Australia) Rado Vidosic

GK	1	(United States) Aubrey Bledsoe
DF	5	(Australia) Ally Green
DF	8	(Canada) Lindsay Agnew
DF	14	(Australia) Alanna Kennedy (c)
DF	7	(Australia) Ellie Brush (yellow card) 74'
MF	2	(Australia) Teresa Polias
MF	12	(Australia) Natalie Tobin (substituted off) 73'
MF	18	(Australia) Taylor Ray (substituted off) 85'
FW	10	(Australia) Remy Siemsen (substituted off) 63'
FW	11	(United States) Sofia Huerta
FW	13	(United States) Veronica Latsko
Substitutes:
GK	30	(Australia) Trudy Burke
DF	17	(Australia) Angelique Hristodoulou
MF	15	(Australia) Mackenzie Hawkesby (substituted on) 85'
MF	19	(Australia) Amy Sayer (substituted on) 73'
FW	20	(Australia) Princess Ibini (substituted on) 63'
Manager:
(Australia) Ante Juric

== Match statistics ==
Stats	Melbourne City	Sydney FC
Ball possession	60.9%	39.1%
Passes	639	401
Passing accuracy	80.3%	67.8%
Corners	2	4
Shots	14	8
On target shots	7	4
Aerial duels won	57.7%	42.3%
Interceptions	19	14
Fouls conceded	6	6
Yellow cards	0	1
Red cards	0	0

== See also ==
- W-League records and statistics
