= Women's Footballer of the Year =

Women's Footballer of the Year may refer to the following annual awards:

- African Women's Footballer of the Year, awarded by the Confederation of African Football
- BBC Women's Footballer of the Year, awarded by the BBC World Service
- FWA Women's Footballer of the Year, awarded by the Football Writers' Association
- PFA Women's Footballer of the Year, awarded by the Professional Footballers Australia
- Women's Footballer of the Year (Germany), awarded by the Association of German Sports Journalists and the publication kicker

== See also ==
- Ukrainian Woman Footballer of the Year
