= PFA Women's Footballer of the Year =

Top Australian women's football (soccer) award

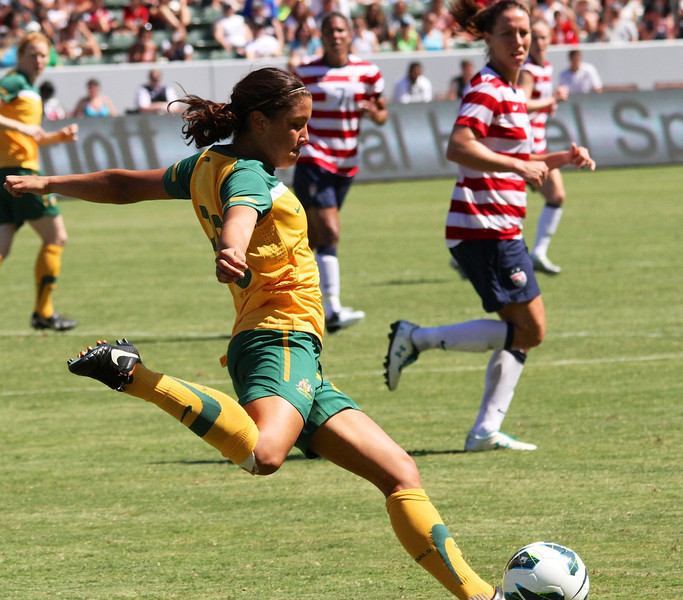
- Sam Kerr has won the award five times.
- Sport: Association football
- Country: Australia
- Presented by: PFA

History
- First award: 2009
- Editions: 11
- First winner: (Australia) Servet Uzunlar
- Most wins: (Australia) Sam Kerr (5 wins)
- Most recent: (Australia) Steph Catley
- Website: Official website

The Professional Footballers Australia Women's Footballer of the Year (often called PFA Women's Footballer of the Year) is an annual award given to the player who is adjudged to have been the best of the year in Australian soccer. The award has been presented since the 2009–10 season and the winner is chosen by a vote amongst the members of the players' trade union, Professional Footballers Australia (PFA). The current holder is Steph Catley, who won the award in 2025.

The first winner of the award was Sydney FC goalkeeper Servet Uzunlar. As of 2020, Sam Kerr, Elise Kellond-Knight, and Lydia Williams have won the award on multiple occasions, and only Kerr has won the award in consecutive seasons. Kerr has won the award a record six times.

The award is open to players playing in the W-League and Australian players playing overseas. No non-Australian player has won the award as of 2020, though many of the players have played in other countries.

== Winners ==
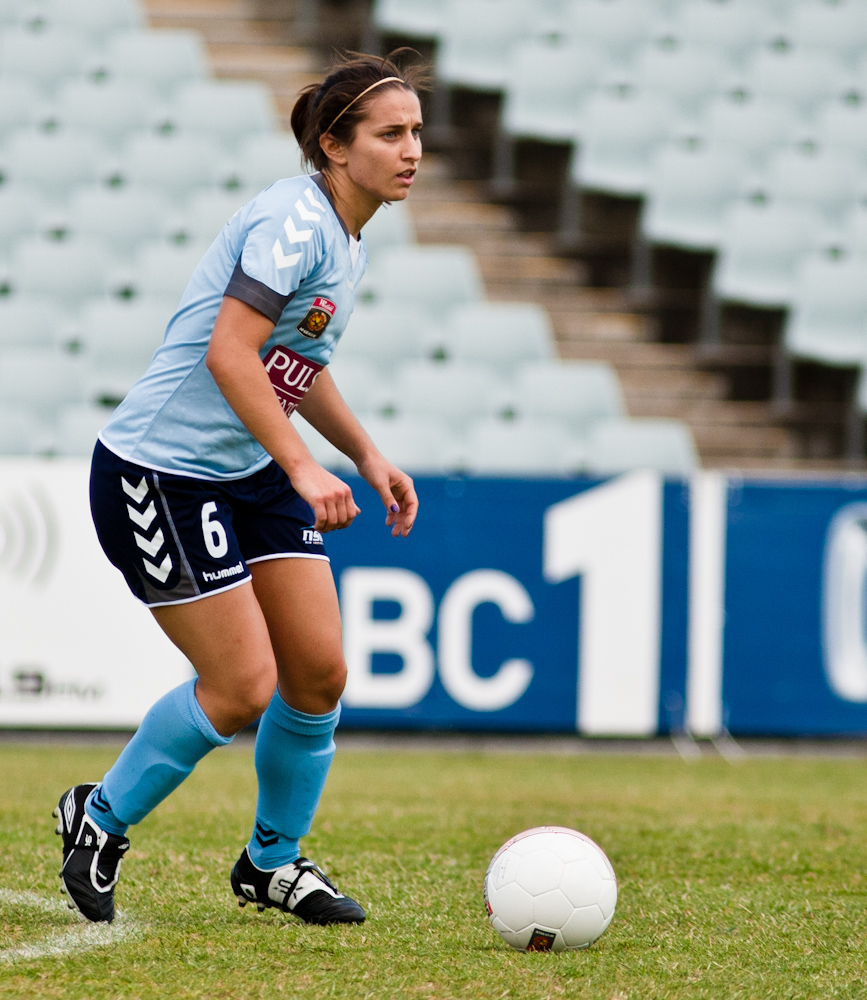
Servet Uzunlar was the first player to win the Footballer of the Year award.

Year	Player	Club	Ref
2010	Servet Uzunlar	(Australia) Sydney FC	
2011	Elise Kellond-Knight	(Australia) Brisbane Roar (Denmark) Fortuna Hjørring	
2012	Lydia Williams	(Australia) Canberra United	
2013	Sam Kerr	(Australia) Sydney FC (United States) Western New York Flash	
2014	Katrina Gorry	(Australia) Brisbane Roar (United States) FC Kansas City	
2015	Elise Kellond-Knight	(Australia) Brisbane Roar (Germany) Turbine Potsdam	
2016	Lydia Williams	(Australia) Canberra United (United States) Houston Dash	
2017	Sam Kerr	(Australia) Perth Glory (United States) Sky Blue FC	
2018	Sam Kerr	(Australia) Perth Glory (United States) Sky Blue FC (United States) Chicago Red Stars	
2019	Sam Kerr	(Australia) Perth Glory (United States) Chicago Red Stars	
2020	Steph Catley	(England) Arsenal (Australia) Melbourne City	
2021	Ellie Carpenter	(France) Olympique Lyonnais	
2022	Sam Kerr	(England) Chelsea	
2023	Sam Kerr	(England) Chelsea	
2024	Steph Catley	(England) Arsenal	

== See also ==
- PFA Footballer of the Year Awards
- Julie Dolan Medal
