= 2018 W-League grand final =

- Event: 2017–18 W-League
Sydney FC	Melbourne City
0	2
- Date: 18 February 2018
- Venue: Allianz Stadium, Sydney
- Player of the Match: Jess Fishlock
- Referee: Rebecca Durcau
- Attendance: 6,025

The 2018 W-League grand final was the final match of the 2017–18 W-League season and deciding the champions of women's football in Australia for the season.

The match took place at Allianz Stadium in Sydney, Australia on 18 February 2018 and was played by Sydney FC and reigning league champions Melbourne City. The match was won by Melbourne City 0–2, who recorded their third consecutive league championship. At the time, the attendance of 6,025 was a record for W-League grand finals.

== Teams ==
Team	Previous grand final appearances (bold indicates winners)
Melbourne City	2 (**2016**, **2017**)
Sydney FC	4 (**2009 (Dec)**, 2011, **2013**, 2016)

== Route to the final ==
Sydney FC		Round	Melbourne City	
2nd place: Pos / Team / Pld / Pts; 1 / Brisbane Roar / 12 / **28**; **2** / Sydney FC / **12** / **25**; 3 / Newcastle Jets / 12 / **20**; 4 / Melbourne City (C) / 12 / **20**; 5 / Canberra United / 12 / **16**; Source: A-Leagues (C) Champions		Regular season	4th place: Pos / Team / Pld / Pts; 2 / Sydney FC / 12 / **25**; 3 / Newcastle Jets / 12 / **20**; **4** / Melbourne City (C) / **12** / **20**; 5 / Canberra United / 12 / **16**; 6 / Perth Glory / 12 / **14**; Source: A-Leagues (C) Champions	
Opponent	Score		Opponent	Score
Newcastle Jets	3–2 (a.e.t.) (H)	Semi-finals	Brisbane Roar	2–0 (A)

Semi-finals
2	**Sydney FC** (a.e.t.)	**3**
3	Newcastle Jets	2
1	Brisbane Roar	0
4	**Melbourne City**	**2**

Grand Final
Sydney FC	0
**Melbourne City**	2

== Match details ==
18 February 2018
17:00 AEDT

Sydney FC	0–2	Melbourne City
	Report	Fishlock 35'; Taylor 75'

Allianz Stadium, Sydney
Attendance: 6,025
Referee: Rebecca Durcau

**Sydney FC**	**Melbourne City**

SYDNEY FC:
GK	29	(United States) Aubrey Bledsoe
DF	15	(Australia) Caitlin Cooper
DF	13	(Australia) Georgia Yeoman-Dale
DF	4	(Australia) Elizabeth Ralston
DF	16	(United States) Emily Sonnett
MF	10	(Australia) Kylie Ledbrook (substituted off) 75', (yellow card) 68'
MF	2	(Australia) Teresa Polias
MF	6	(Australia) Chloe Logarzo (yellow card) 89'
FW	11	(Australia) Lisa De Vanna
FW	19	(Australia) Leena Khamis (substituted off) 66'
FW	20	(Australia) Princess Ibini (substituted off) 84'
Substitutes:
FW	3	(Australia) Remy Siemsen (substituted on) 66'
MF	7	(Australia) Rachael Soutar (substituted on) 75'
FW	21	(Australia) Julia Vignes (substituted on) 84'
GK	1	(Australia) Sham Khamis
FW	14	(New Zealand) Emma Rolston
Manager:
(Australia) Ante Juric

MELBOURNE CITY:
GK	1	(Australia) Lydia Williams
DF	2	(Japan) Yukari Kinga
DF	7	(Australia) Steph Catley (c)
DF	13	(New Zealand) Rebekah Stott
DF	3	(United States) Lauren Barnes
MF	10	(Wales) Jess Fishlock
MF	6	(Australia) Aivi Luik
FW	17	(Australia) Kyah Simon (substituted off) 62'
FW	12	(England) Jodie Taylor (substituted off) 90+2'
FW	4	(United States) Ashley Hatch (substituted off) 84'
Substitutes:
FW	11	(Australia) Rhali Dobson (substituted on) 62'
FW	15	(Australia) Amy Jackson (substituted on) 84', (yellow card) 87'
FW	19	(Australia) Tyla-Jay Vlajnic (substituted on) 90+2'
MF	5	(Australia) Lia Muldeary
GK	20	(Australia) Emily Shields
Manager:
(Australia) Patrick Kisnorbo

== Match statistics ==
Stats	Sydney FC	Melbourne City
Ball possession	50.4%	49.6%
Passes	388	390
Passing accuracy	68.3%	67.2%
Corners	4	1
Shots	7	10
On target shots	2	5
Aerial duels won	31.8%	68.2%
Interceptions	24	9
Fouls conceded	14	12
Yellow cards	2	1
Red cards	0	0

== See also ==
- List of W-League champions
