= Rhali Dobson =

Australian soccer player (born 1992)

Personal information
- Full name: Rhali Dobson
- Date of birth: 21 April 1992 (age 34)
- Place of birth: Wauchope, New South Wales, Australia
- Height: 1.65 m (5 ft 5 in)
- Position: Striker

Youth career
- Wauchope SC

Senior career*
Years	Team	Apps	(Gls)
2008–2009	Newcastle Jets	6	(0)
2011–2012	Newcastle Jets	9	(2)
2012–2013	Merewether United		
2013	Adamstown Rosebud		
2013–2017	Newcastle Jets	26	(9)
2014	→ Adamstown Rosebud (loan)		
2016	→ Adamstown Rosebud (loan)		
2017	→ Merewether United (loan)		
2017–2021	Melbourne City	45	(3)
2021–present	Bolwarra Lorn		

International career^{‡}
2007	Australia U17	3	(0)
2014	Australia	1	(0)
- * Club domestic league appearances and goals as of 16 January 2020 ‡ National team caps and goals as of 5 March 2017

Rhali Dobson (born 21 April 1992) is an Australian soccer player who played for the Australia women's national under-17 soccer team in 2007, Australia women's national soccer team (Matildas) in 2014 and in the W-League for Melbourne City (2017–21) and Newcastle Jets.

== Early life ==
Dobson began playing soccer at the age of five in her hometown of Wauchope, New South Wales, playing for the Wauchope Soccer Club.

== Club career ==
Dobson began her career at Newcastle Jets and was a member of their 2008-09 inaugural W-League squad which came runner up in the premier and semi-finalists in that season's championships. She would continue to play intermittent seasons for the Jets, but was dropped from the squad in 2012, joining first Merewether United and then moving to Adamstown Rosebud in circumstances that the Newcastle Herald described as "a far from amicable split". Dobson's improved form would see her make top scorer in the WPL and return to the Jets in 2013. A strong 2014 season saw Dobson selected for the National Team and score 6 times for the Jets, including her first top-flight brace in a 4–0 win over Adelaide United. She briefly returned to Merewether United for the 2017 Northern NSW Football Women's Premier League season, after making 55 total appearances for the Jets since the 2008 season.

On 24 September 2017 Dobson joined title defenders Melbourne City. With City, she won two W-League Championships in the 17/18 and 19/20 seasons, making a second-half substitute appearance in the 2018 W-League Grand Final 2–0 victory over Sydney FC. Dobson made her 100th appearance in the W-League in the 20/21 season, the 28th player to do so since the league was founded.

Dobson announced her retirement from football in March 2021 in order to support her partner, Matt Stonham, who has brain cancer. On 25 March 2021 she played her last professional match for Melbourne City in which she also scored a goal in a 2–1 win over Perth Glory, coincidentally the team against which she'd made her W-League debut. Dobson returned to amateur football in May with men's side Bolwarra Lorn, coached by Stonham, in the Australian Zone League Two. This included two games in Bolwara's FFA Cup campaign, culminating in a 13–0 defeat by semi-professional men's side Lambton Jaffas in the preliminary fourth round.

== International career ==
Dobson played three matches for Australia under-17 in 2007, including at the 2007 Australian Youth Olympic Festival and 2007 AFC U-16 Women's Championship.

Dobson made her international debut for Australia in April 2014 against Brazil, coming on as a late substitute for Lisa De Vanna to see out a 2-1 friendly victory in Brisbane.

== Personal life ==
Dobson works full-time as an occupational therapist in New South Wales. Former Australia player Tracie McGovern is a cousin of Dobson.

Dobson got engaged to her partner, Matt, at her last match for Melbourne City in March 2021.

== Honours ==
=== Club ===
Melbourne City

- W-League Premiership: 2019–20
- W-League Championship: 2018, 2020
