= Steph Catley =

Australian soccer player (born 1994)

- Catley in 2026

Personal information
- Full name: Stephanie-Elise Catley
- Date of birth: 26 January 1994 (age 32)
- Place of birth: Melbourne, Victoria, Australia
- Height: 1.71 m (5 ft 7 in)
- Positions: Left-back; centre-back

Team information
- Current team: Arsenal
- Number: 7

Youth career
- 2000–2007: East Bentleigh
- 2007–2009: South East Cougars

Senior career*
Years	Team	Apps	(Gls)
2009–2014	Melbourne Victory	51	(7)
2014–2015	Portland Thorns FC	18	(0)
2014–2015	→ Melbourne Victory (loan)	13	(2)
2015–2020	→ Melbourne City (loan)	62	(3)
2016–2017	Orlando Pride	35	(1)
2018–2019	Reign FC	33	(0)
2020–	Arsenal	104	(3)

International career^{‡}
2008–2009	Australia U17	12	(0)
2011–2014	Australia U20	5	(0)
2012–	Australia	149	(7)
- * Club domestic league appearances and goals as of 8 November 2026 ‡ National team caps and goals as of 10 October 2026

Stephanie-Elise Catley (born 26 January 1994) is an Australian professional soccer player who plays as a defender for the English club Arsenal and the Australia national team. She has also played for the American clubs Orlando Pride, Portland Thorns FC and Reign FC, and for Melbourne Victory and Melbourne City in the Australian W-League. With over 130 international appearances, she is the sixth-most capped player in Australia's history. She was twice named PFA Women's Player of the Year, and was named the W-League's Young Player of the Year for the 2012–13 season. She was also twice named Female U20 Footballer of the Year by Football Federation Australia. Catley has played various positions in defence, including left-back, centre-back and sweeper.

== Early life ==
Born and raised in Melbourne by her parents Lesley and Stephen, Catley was educated at Bentleigh Secondary College and joined her first soccer team at age six. She was the only girl in the East Bentleigh FC squad, the same team her older brother Daniel had played on, and described herself as a tomboy growing up. She noted, "I fell in love with the game and with the idea of making myself the best footballer that I could be. I trained by myself, with my brother and with the other boys in the team until I made my first representative team." At age 13, she started playing for Sandringham, one of the largest soccer clubs in Victoria. When she was 15, Catley made her first state team and was chosen for the under-17 national team.

== Club career ==
=== Melbourne Victory, 2009–14 ===
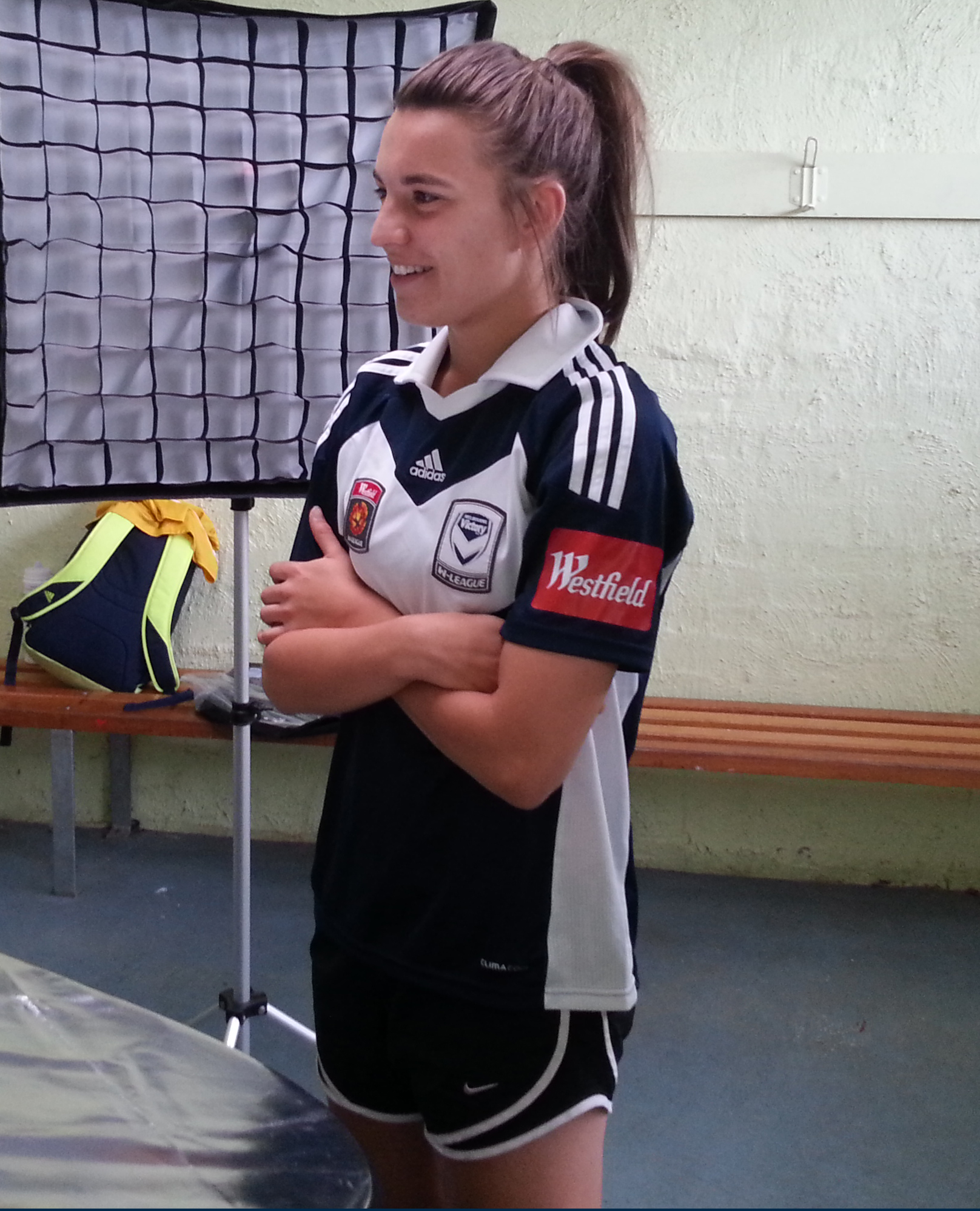
Catley posing for a photograph with Melbourne Victory

Catley was a talented youngster who played for the South East Cougars in Football Federation Victoria's Victorian Champions League program. She made her senior debut with Melbourne Victory in October 2009 at the age of 15. Originally used as a midfielder, Catley was a key figure at her club and scored her first goal in her second season three days before her birthday in January 2011, again against Perth Glory. Following a switch to defence for the 2011/12 season, Catley had her most impressive season to date and was named Female Footballer of the Year. She later became captain of the Victory, making 51 appearances, scoring 7 goals in her first 5 years playing for the club.

=== Portland Thorns FC, 2014–15 ===
Catley signed with Portland Thorns in the United States' National Women's Soccer League (NWSL) for the 2014 season. Catley made 14 starts in 15 matches as a defender during the 2014 season. Portland finished in third place with a 10–8–6 record. The third-place finish earned the team a berth to the semi-finals where the Thorns were defeated 2–0 by eventual champions FC Kansas City. Catley was named to the league's Second XI team at the end of the season for her five assists.

During the 2015 season, Catley played in three games for the Thorns as much of her time was usurped by the 2015 FIFA Women's World Cup. Portland finished in sixth place with a 6–9–5 record.

==== Melbourne Victory (loan), 2014–15 ====
During the NWSL offseason, Catley signed a loan agreement to return to her original club, the Melbourne Victory, for the 2014 W-League season. She was captain and a starting defender in all 13 games she played helping Victory finish in second place during the regular season with a 6–4–2 record. Catley scored a goal against Canberra on 28 September lifting Melbourne Victory to a 4–2 win. She scored her second goal of the season during a 3–0 win over Western Sydney Wanderers on 9 November. After advancing to the semifinals, Melbourne Victory was defeated by eventual champions, Canberra United, in a penalty kick shootout.

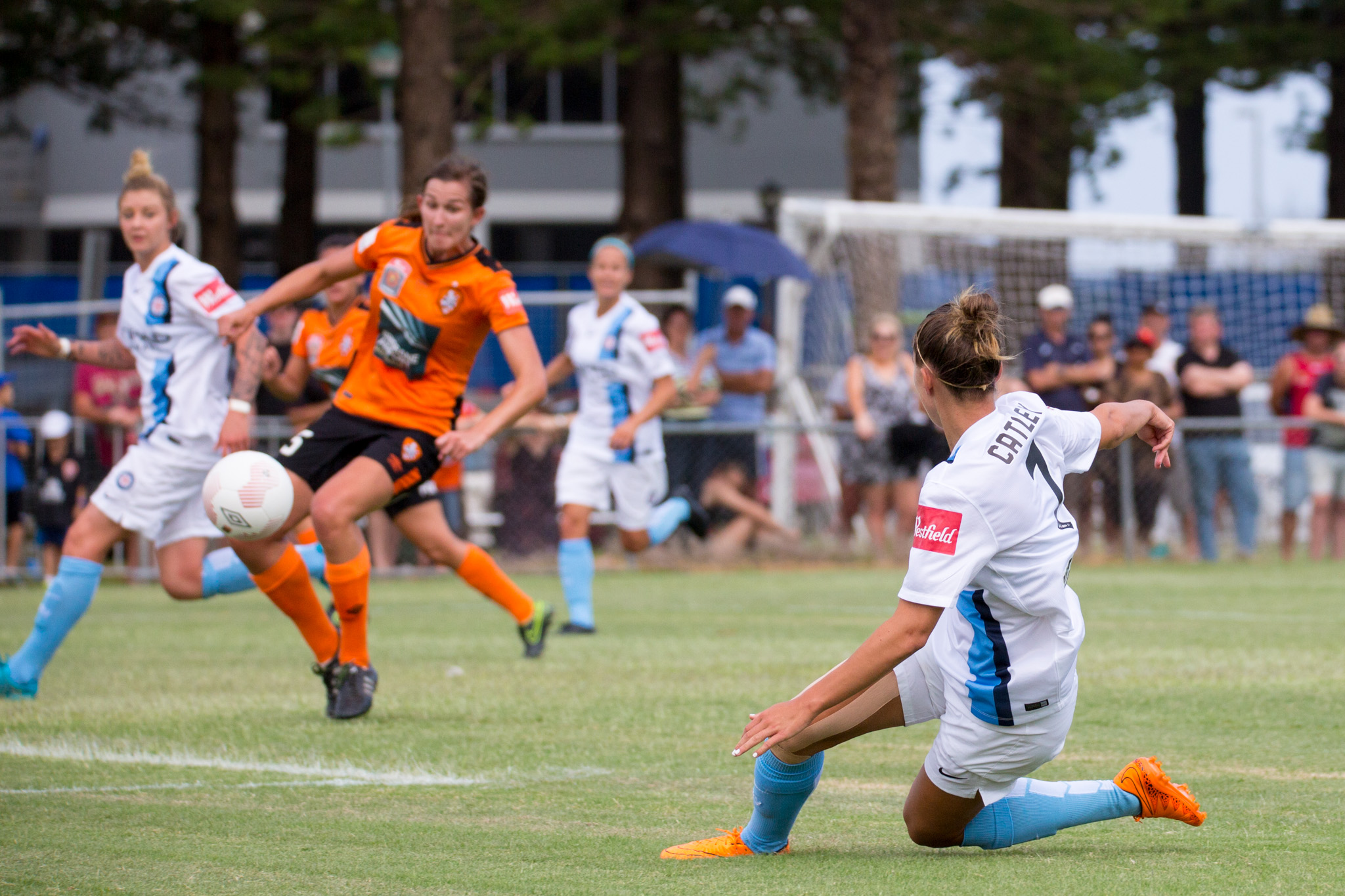
Catley during a Melbourne City match against Brisbane Roar, December 2015

==== Melbourne City (loan), 2015–16 ====
On 17 September 2015, newly created Melbourne City announced they had signed Catley on a loan agreement for the 2015–16 W-League season. Catley was a starting defender in all 13 matches she played. Melbourne City finished in first place during their inaugural season with an undefeated 12–0–0 record. During the semifinal match on 25 January 2016, Catley scored the fourth penalty for Melbourne City in a penalty shootout win against the Brisbane Roar earning a berth to the 2016 W-League Grand Final. Melbourne City won the Grand Final 4–1 against Sydney FC.

=== Orlando Pride, 2016–17 ===
On 10 December 2015, Portland Thorns announced they had traded Catley to expansion team Orlando Pride in exchange for goalkeeper Adrianna Franch and a 3rd round pick (#21) in the 2016 NWSL College Draft, which was used to select Arizona State Sun Devils defender McKenzie Berryhill. Catley scored Orlando's first-ever goal in the NWSL on 21 April 2016, which was subsequently voted by fans as the NWSL Goal of the Week. She was a starting defender in all eleven games that she played. The Pride finished their inaugural season in ninth place with a 6–13–1 record.

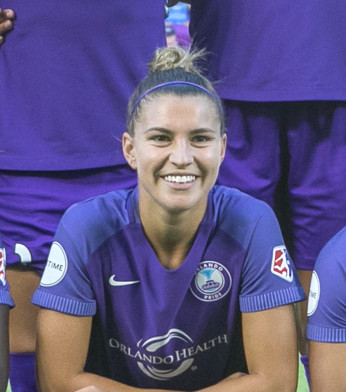
Catley with the Orlando Pride, 2017

Catley returned to the Pride for the 2017 season. She was a starting defender in all 24 games recording 2,120 minutes on the pitch. During a match against Houston Dash, Catley's last-minute goal-line clearance was voted NWSL Save of the Week for Week 10. Orlando climbed the league ladder to a third-place finish during the regular season earning a berth to their first NWSL Playoffs. Orlando was defeated by the Portland Thorns 4–1 in the semi-final. Catley was named to the NWSL Second XI team and nominated for Defender of the Year after the season.

==== Melbourne City (loan), 2016–18 ====
Catley signed two other loan agreements with Melbourne City for the 2016–17 W-League and 2017–18 W-League seasons. Upon returning to Australia, Catley was named captain of the reigning league champions, Melbourne City. City went on to be Grand Final Champions in both these campaigns. During the 2016–17 season, Catley captained the team as the starting left-back defender in all 14 games of the regular season. She scored a goal in the 74th minute of a 3–0 win over Melbourne Victory on 27 November 2016. Melbourne City finished in fourth place during the regular season with a 6–4–2 record and earned a berth to the Final Stages. After defeating Canberra United 1–0 in extra time during the semi-final with Catley playing every minute, Melbourne City advanced to the 2017 W-League Grand Final where they faced Perth Glory and won the Championship 2–0 for the second consecutive time — a first for any club in the league. Catley was named to the 2016/17 W-League Team of the Season by Professional Footballers Australia (PFA).

2017–18 season, Catley was the starting left-back for all 14 matches. Melbourne City finished in fourth place during the regular season with a 6–4–2 record mirroring their previous season. Catley celebrated her 100th W-League appearance with a 1–0 shutout against Western Sydney Wanderers in January. She also assisted on Jess Fishlock's game-winning goal during the match. Catley led the defense to shut out Brisbane Roar in a 2–0 semi-final win. Advancing to the 2018 W-League Grand Final, Catley was described by ESPN as one of Australia's best defenders along with teammate Alanna Kennedy. Catley captained the squad to a 2–0 shutout against league premiers, Sydney FC, entering the record books as the only W-League team to win three consecutive Grand Final championships. Catley was named to the 2017–18 W-League Team of the Season by the PFA.

=== Reign FC, 2018–19 ===
Prior to the 2018 NWSL season, Catley was traded to Reign FC in exchange for Christine Nairn and Carson Pickett. During the 2018 season, Catley was a starting defender in the 17 matches in which she played. The Reign finished the regular season in third place with a 11–5–8 record earning a berth to the NWSL Playoffs. Catley played every minute of the team's 2–1 loss to Portland in the semi-finals.

Following her first season with the Reign, Catley underwent knee surgery after she was injured in a friendly international match in February 2019. Despite missing the beginning of the 2019 NWSL season and competing at the 2019 FIFA Women's World Cup in France, Catley made 16 appearances for the Reign securing a fourth-place finish during the regular season. After advancing to the NWSL Playoffs, the Reign were defeated by reigning champions North Carolina Courage 4–1.

In May 2020, Catley announced her departure from the Reign. She added, "As an athlete you're always trying to push yourself to be better. I've been in the NWSL for the past 7 years and the league had made me the player I am today. However, I believe now is the right time to move onto the next chapter and challenge myself in a different environment. No matter where I am or who I'm playing for, I will always be OL Reign's biggest supporter."

==== Melbourne City (loan), 2018–20 ====
"It's an absolutely incredible feeling and very unexpected, especially being nominated alongside Sam [Kerr] and Emily [Van Egmond] who have both had incredible seasons. It's very humbling and there's no better award then being recognised by your teammates; that definitely hits home and it's a proud moment for me for sure."

— Steph Catley on winning the PFA Women's Footballer of the Year award, 2020

After undergoing minor knee surgery in October 2018 to fix a lingering issue, Catley returned to Australia and played for Melbourne City in the 2018–19 W-League season. She made seven appearances and scored one goal. Melbourne City dropped for the first time to a fifth-place finish during the regular season. Catley was named to the 2018–19 W-League Team of the Season by the PFA for the third consecutive time.

Catley returned to Melbourne City for the 2019–20 season and started in every match. Melbourne City won the premiership after finishing first in the regular season with an undefeated 11–0–1 record. During the 2020 W-League Grand Final, Catley scored the game-winning goal against Sydney FC in the team's 1–0 win. The win marked the fourth championship in five years for the club and Catley was named Player of the Match. Following the season, Catley was named to the 2019–20 W-League Team of the Season by the PFA for the fourth consecutive time. She was also named PFA Women's Footballer of the Year.

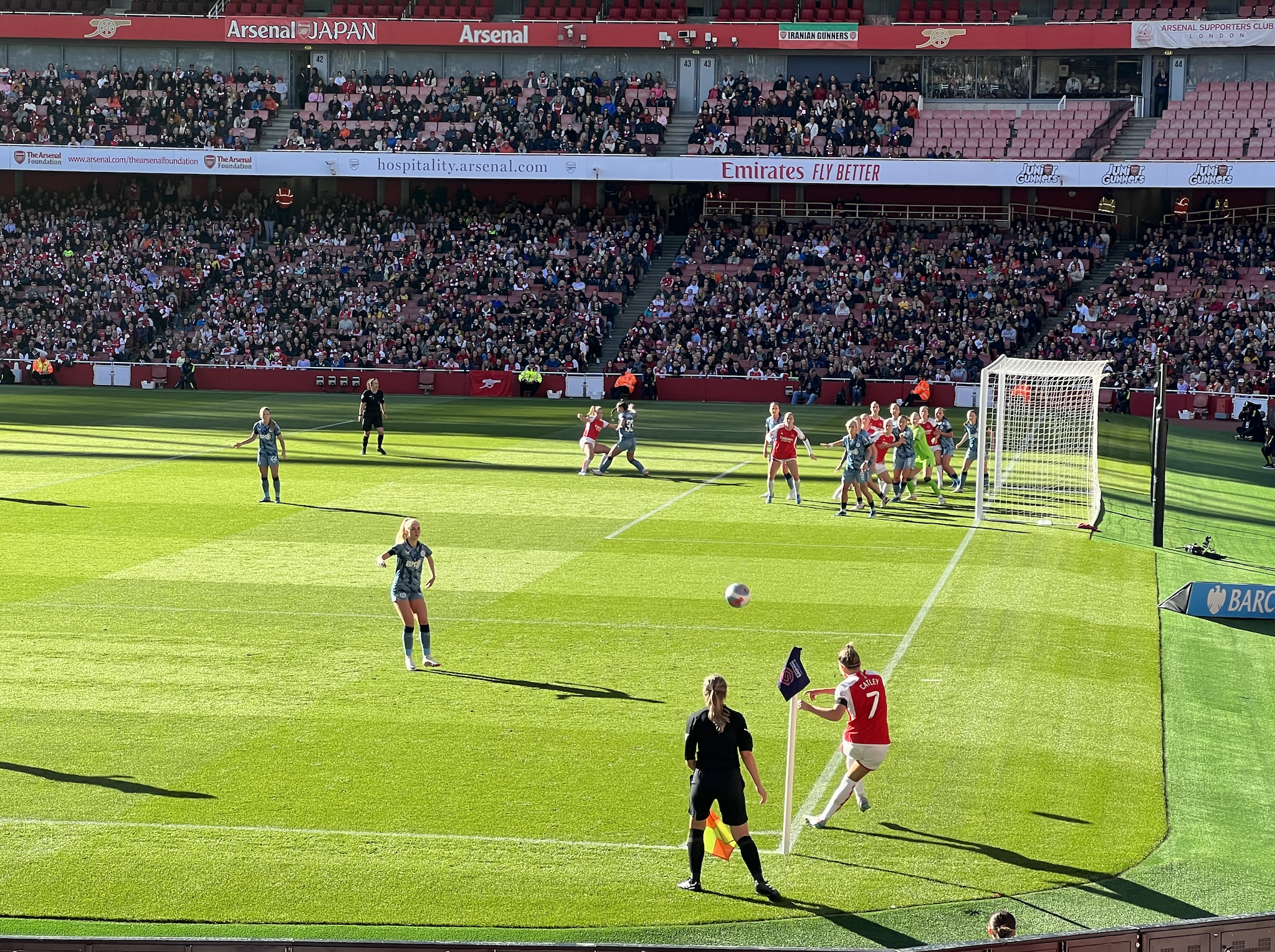
Catley delivering a corner kick for Arsenal at the Emirates Stadium in October 2023.

=== Arsenal, 2020– ===
In July 2020, Catley signed with Arsenal for the 2020–21 FA WSL season. Arsenal manager, Joe Montemurro said of the signing, "she suits our fluidity and she's very good in a positional sense, but more importantly she's very effective going forward, so we're excited to have her as part of the squad and we're looking forward to some exciting times together." Catley made her debut for the club during the club's 6–1 win over Reading F.C. on 6 September. In May 2022, having established herself as a first-team regular, Catley signed a new contract with the club.

Following the team's 2023 Champions League semi-final exit, Catley said that the "setbacks are what brings the team closer together". In June 2023, Catley signed a new contract with Arsenal. She helped the club win both the 2022–23 and 2023–24 FA Women's League Cup trophies.

Towards the end of 2024, then-interim head coach Renée Slegers moved Catley from left-back to centre-back on a regular basis and she thrived in the role. In February 2025, the defender pinpointed the aspects she liked about her new position, telling Sky Sports: "I love being on the ball and there's so many opportunities to dictate play and play different types of passes.

"At centre-back, you can really set things up and pick your passes. I love organising, I love communicating and that part of my game really comes out." Her central defensive partnership with Leah Williamson was key to Arsenal winning the 2024–25 UEFA Women's Champions League. During the Champions League final in May 2025 at the Estádio José Alvalade in Lisbon, Catley provided a stout defence at centre-back against holders and favourites Barcelona to help Arsenal to a 1–0 win.

On 28 April 2026, Arsenal announced that Catley had signed a new contract with the club, with the BBC reporting that they understood that it was a 2-year deal, keeping the centre-back at the club through to the end of the 2027-28 season.

== International career ==
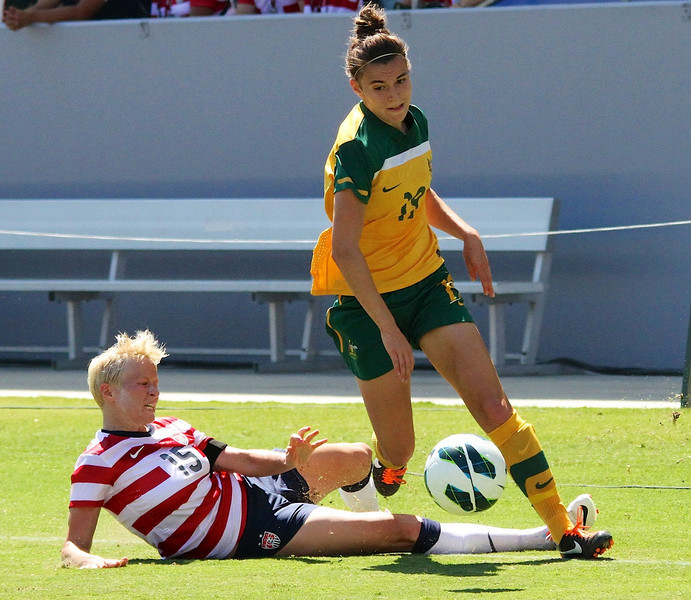
Catley playing for Australia during a match against the United States, 2012

Having spent years playing in the youth teams of Australia, Catley made her international senior debut against New Zealand in June 2012, along with her childhood friend Ashley Brown. Catley made 32 appearances for the Matildas leading into her first World Cup campaign.

In the summer of 2015 at age 21, Catley competed with the Matildas at the 2015 FIFA Women's World Cup in Canada. During the tournament, Catley played every minute of all five of Australia's matches in the left back position, tallying a total of 450 minutes. She made eight tackles and won them all. Catley also made 12 interceptions and won 13 duels. Her passing accuracy was measured at 72.4%. The Matildas lost 3–1 to the United States during their first group stage match. Catley helped hold Nigeria to a 2–0 shutout in the team's second group stage match and a 1–1 draw against Sweden. Australia finished second in the "Group of Death" and advanced to the Round of 16 where they faced Brazil and won 1–0 as the underdog team. The Matildas faced 2011 champions, Japan in the quarterfinals and narrowly lost 1–0 after Japan scored a last–minute goal in the 87th minute.

After qualifying for the 2016 Rio Olympics in Japan, the Matildas faced Canada in their first group stage match and lost 2–0 with Catley subbing in for Sam Kerr at halftime. The team tied their next group stage match against Germany 2–2. After defeating Zimbabwe 6–1, the team finished third in Group F and top ranking in the third place teams advancing to the knockout stage. During their "thrilling" quarterfinal match against Brazil, the defense kept Brazil to a 0–0 draw, but the Matildas were ultimately edged out 7–6 during the shootout and knocked out of the competition. Catley competed in all four games for the Matildas making three starts.

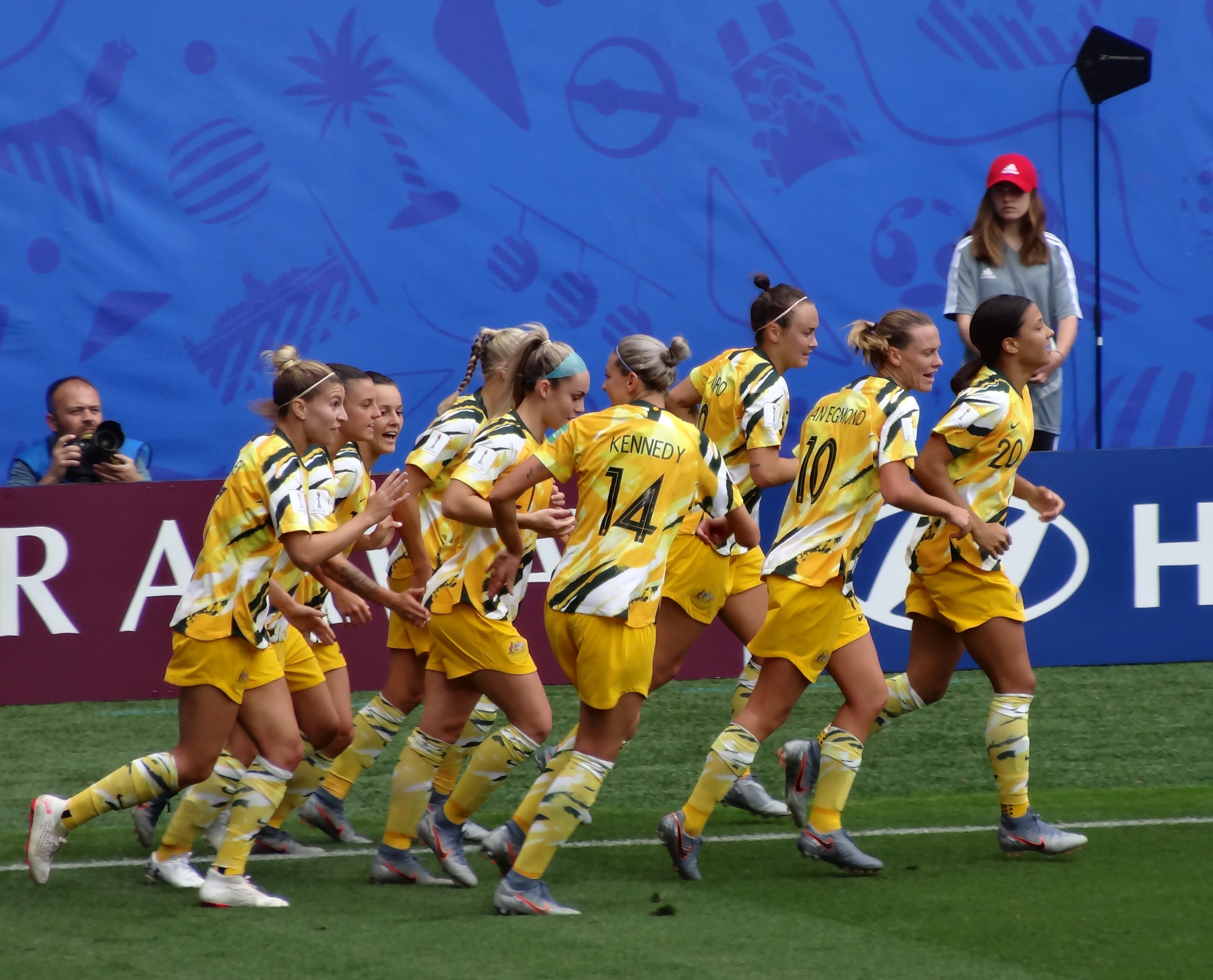
Catley (far left) during a match against Italy at the 2019 FIFA Women's World Cup in France

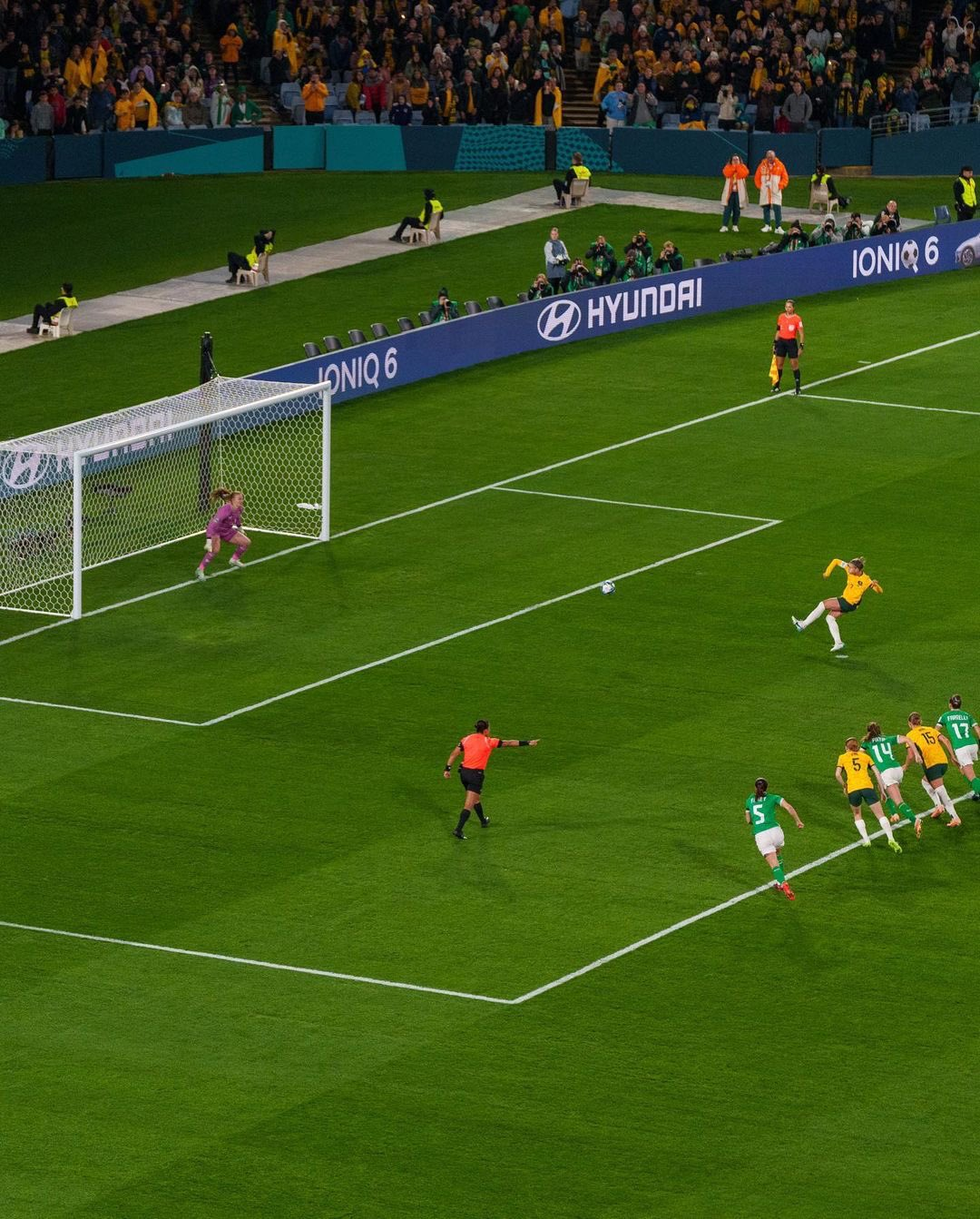
Catley scoring the opening goal for Australia at the 2023 FIFA Women's World Cup against Ireland

Catley competed at the 2017 Algarve Cup and 2017 Tournament of Nations. In 2018, Catley she helped the Matildas to a fourth-place finish at the 2018 Algarve Cup, a second place win at the 2018 AFC Women's Asian Cup and 2019 Algarve Cup and their first place win at the 2017 Tournament of Nations.

On 14 May 2019, Catley was named vice-captain for the Matildas squad for the 2019 FIFA Women's World Cup in France. Catley played as a centre defender during the tournament — her second World Cup selection —covering for injured players Clare Polkinghorne and Laura Alleway. During the team's first group stage match against Italy, a late Italian goal in the fifth minute of extratime resulted in a 2–1 surprising loss for the Matildas. They faced rivals Brazil next and won 3–2. Catley broke her hand during Australia's 4–1 over Jamaica, though continued to play through the tournament.

Australia finished second in Group C and advanced to the Round of 16 where they faced Norway. After a 1–1 tie, Norway won 4–1 in penalties and the Matildas were knocked out of the tournament. On the loss, Catley said, "This team had high expectations and goals coming into this tournament. To go out this way, it was pretty rough, and I haven't really wrapped my head around it. It doesn't really feel like we're out. (But) it's a very strong group and as you can see in the way that we play, we never doubt what we can do or think that we can win, so taking that, being more clinical and doing all the little things right, we're going to be fine."

Catley was selected for the Australian women's football Matildas soccer team which qualified for the Tokyo 2020 Olympics. The Matildas advanced to the quarter-finals with one victory and a draw in the group play. In the quarter-finals they beat Great Britain 4–3 after extra time. However, they lost 1–0 to Sweden in the semi-final and were then beaten 4–3 in the bronze medal playoff by USA. On 30 January 2022, she played her 100th match for Australia in a 1–0 defeat against South Korea in the 2022 AFC Women's Asian Cup quarter-finals.

On 3 July 2023, Catley was once again named vice-captain of the Matildas for the 2023 FIFA Women's World Cup. Catley scored the winner in the opening game against Ireland. It was a penalty which was the only goal of the game. She scored the final goal in Australia's 4-0 win over Canada, once again via a penalty.

On 4 June 2024, Catley was named in the Matildas team which qualified for the Paris 2024 Olympics, her third Olympic Games selection. In the absence of the injured Sam Kerr, Catley was selected as captain for the Matildas' Olympics campaign. She scored twice and had two assists in Australia's sole victory at the tournament; a dramatic 6–5 win over Zambia.

== Personal life ==
In January 2023, Catley announced that she was engaged to her long-time partner and fellow soccer player Dean Bouzanis. The pair had met when both played at Melbourne City and were dating by 2017. Catley and Bouzanis separated in 2024.

Catley is a fan of the St Kilda Saints in the Australian Football League (AFL). Her favourite player of all time is Lenny Hayes, who she met and did a jersey swap with in July 2023. As a child, she supported Liverpool in the Premier League.

According to Matildas teammate Mackenzie Arnold, her favourite song is reportedly "Strawberry Kisses" by Nikki Webster. Arnold revealed in 2023 that the song was a "team favourite" during the 2023 FIFA Women's World Cup, held in Australia and New Zealand. This led to the song becoming associated with the team, even being described as the Matildas' unofficial team song, and after the World Cup ended, Webster surprised the team and audience by performing the song at the Matildas' public reception at Riverstage in Brisbane.

== In popular media ==
Catley appeared on the cover of the Australian edition of FIFA 16, alongside global cover-star Lionel Messi, as well as compatriot Tim Cahill, making her one of the first women to feature on the cover of an EA Sports video game. She has been featured in each annual edition of the game along with her national teammates since. In 2016, she was the Guest Quiz Master on the fifth episode of the fourth season of the Australian game show, Have You Been Paying Attention?.

== Career statistics ==
=== Club ===
As of match played 12 November 2026

Appearances and goals by club, season and competition
Club	Season	League			National cup (Note: Includes FA Cup)		League cup (Note: Includes League Cup)		Continental (Note: Includes Champions League)		Other		Total	
Club	Season	Division	Apps	Goals	Apps	Goals	Apps	Goals	Apps	Goals	Apps	Goals	Apps	Goals
Melbourne Victory	2009	W-League	5	0	—		—		—		—		5	0
Melbourne Victory	2010–11	W-League	10	3	—		—		—		—		10	3
Melbourne Victory	2011–12	W-League	10	0	—		—		—		—		10	0
Melbourne Victory	2012–13	W-League	12	3	—		—		—		—		12	3
Melbourne Victory	2013–14	W-League	14	1	—		—		—		—		14	1
Melbourne Victory	2014	W-League	13	2	—		—		—		—		13	2
Melbourne Victory	Total		64	9	0	0	0	0	0	0	0	0	64	9
Portland Thorns	2014	NWSL	15	0	—		—		—		—		15	0
Portland Thorns	2015	NWSL	3	0	—		—		—		—		3	0
Portland Thorns	Total		18	0	0	0	0	0	0	0	0	0	18	0
Melbourne City	2015–16	W-League	13	0	—		—		—		—		13	0
Melbourne City	2016–17	W-League	14	1	—		—		—		—		14	1
Melbourne City	2017–18	W-League	14	0	—		—		—		—		14	0
Melbourne City	2018–19	W-League	7	1	—		—		—		—		7	1
Melbourne City	2019–20	W-League	14	1	—		—		—		—		14	1
Melbourne City	Total		62	3	0	0	0	0	0	0	0	0	62	3
Orlando Pride	2016	NWSL	11	1	—		—		—		—		11	1
Orlando Pride	2017	NWSL	24	0	—		—		—		—		24	0
Orlando Pride	Total		35	1	0	0	0	0	0	0	0	0	35	1
OL Reign	2018	NWSL	17	0	—		—		—		—		17	0
OL Reign	2019	NWSL	16	0	—		—		—		—		16	0
OL Reign	Total		33	0	0	0	0	0	0	0	0	0	33	0
Arsenal	2020–21	WSL	6	0	0	0	0	0	1	0	—		7	0
Arsenal	2021–22	WSL	18	1	2	0	0	0	12	1	—		32	2
Arsenal	2022–23	WSL	17	1	2	0	3	0	10	0	—		32	1
Arsenal	2023–24	WSL	22	1	1	0	7	0	2	0	—		32	1
Arsenal	2024–25	WSL	19	0	2	0	1	0	10	0	—		32	0
Arsenal	2025–26	WSL	16	0	2	0	1	0	8	0	1 (Note: Appearance in FIFA Women's Champions Cup)	0	28	0
Arsenal	2026–27	WSL	6	0	0	0	—		3	0	—		9	0
Arsenal	Total		104	3	9	0	12	0	46	1	1	0	172	4
Career total			316	16	9	0	12	0	46	1	1	0	384	17

=== International ===
Scores and results list Australia's goal tally first, score column indicates score after each Catley goal.

List of international goals scored by Steph Catley
No.	Date	Venue	Opponent	Score	Result	Competition
1	22 November 2012	Bao'an Stadium, Shenzhen, China	Hong Kong	4–0	4–0	2013 EAFF Women's East Asian Cup qualifying
2	19 May 2015	Valentine Sports Park, Sydney, Australia	Vietnam	1–0	4–0	Friendly
3	7 February 2020	Campbelltown Stadium, Sydney, Australia	Chinese Taipei	3–0	7–0	2020 AFC Women's Olympic Qualifying Tournament
4	20 July 2023	Stadium Australia, Sydney, Australia	Republic of Ireland	1–0	1–0	2023 FIFA Women's World Cup
5	31 July 2023	Melbourne Rectangular Stadium, Melbourne, Australia	Canada	4–0	4–0	2023 FIFA Women's World Cup
6	28 July 2024	Stade de Nice, Nice, France	Zambia	4–5	6–5	2024 Summer Olympics
7	28 July 2024	Stade de Nice, Nice, France	Zambia	5–5	6–5	2024 Summer Olympics

== Honours ==
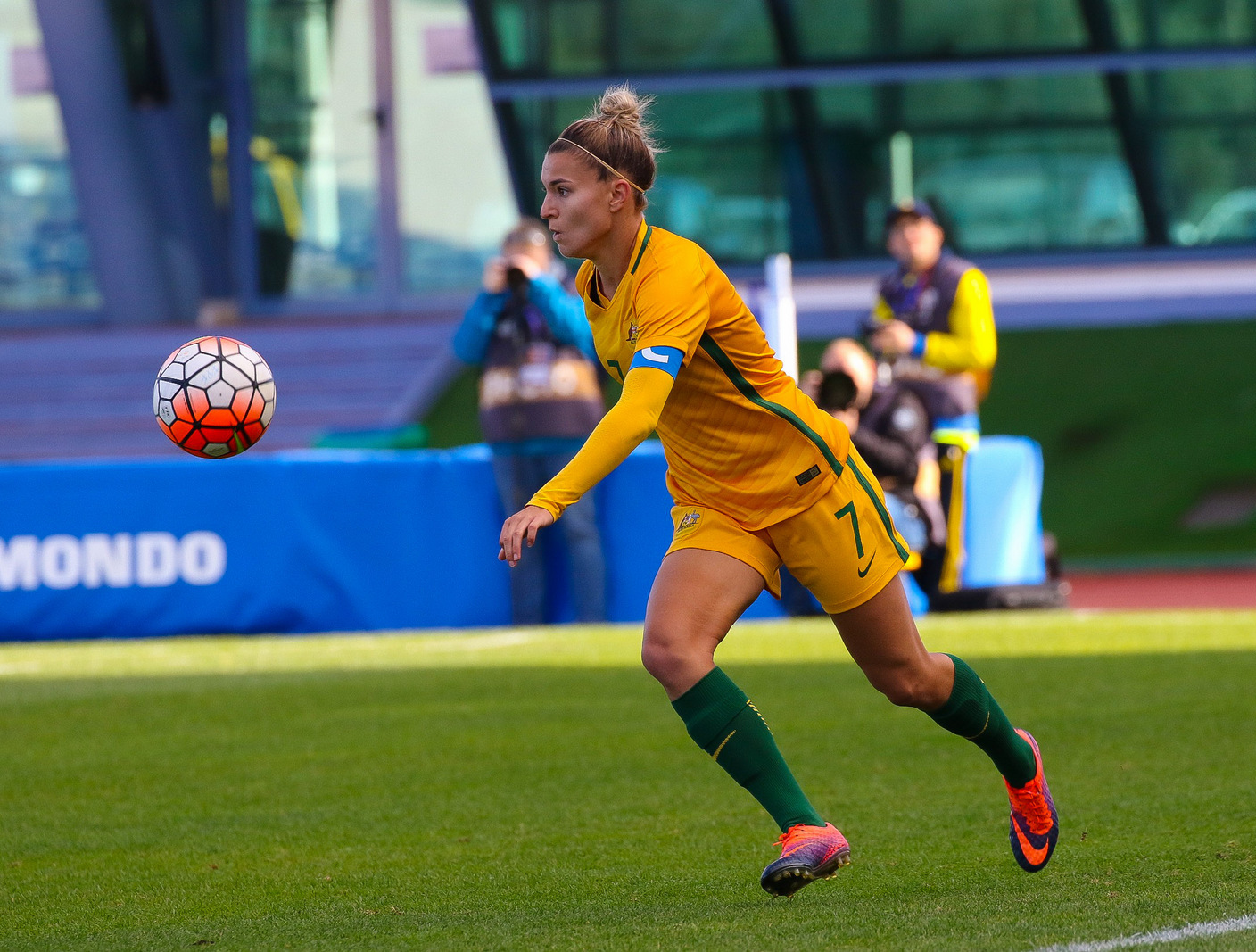
Catley playing for the Matildas at the 2017 Algarve Cup

Melbourne Victory

- W-League Championship: 2013–14

Melbourne City FC

- W-League Premiership: 2015–16 2019–2020
- W-League Championship: 2016, 2017, 2018, 2020

Arsenal

- FA Women's League Cup: 2022–23, 2023-24
- UEFA Women's Champions League: 2024–25
- FIFA Women's Champions Cup: 2026

Australia

- AFF U-16 Women's Championship: 2009
- AFC Olympic Qualifying Tournament: 2016, 2020, 2024

Individual

- W-League Young Player of the Year: 2012–13
- FFA Female U20 Footballer of the Year: 2012, 2013
- W-League Team of the Season: 2016–17, 2017–18, 2018–19, 2019–20
- PFA Women's Player of the Year: 2020, 2024
- NWSL Second XI: 2014, 2017, 2018
- IFFHS AFC Woman Team of the Decade 2011–2020

== See also ==
- List of Australia women's international soccer players
- List of OL Reign players
- List of Melbourne City FC (W-League) records and statistics
- List of foreign FA Women's Super League players
- List of women's footballers with 100 or more international caps
