= CB Smith Reserve =

Football stadium in Fawkner, Australia

- Interactive map of CB Smith Reserve
- Location: 79-83 Jukes Road, Fawkner
- Coordinates: 37°42′16″S 144°58′08″E 37°42'16.8"S 144°58'08.9"E
- Owner: City of Merri-bek
- Capacity: 2,000 (500 seats)
- Surface: Grass

Tenants
- Brunswick Juventus FC; Fawkner Soccer Club; Melbourne Victory Women (2021–2023); Melbourne City ALW (2015–2021); Melbourne City Youth (2015–2020); Pascoe Vale SC (2015–2025); Moreland City FC

CB Smith Reserve is a football facility based in Fawkner, Victoria, a suburb 12 km north of the centre of Melbourne. The venue is home to the Brunswick Juventus who compete in the Victoria Premier League, as well as State League side Fawkner SC as principle tenant. The venue also hosted home games for Pascoe Vale Soccer Club and Melbourne City FC in the national W-League competition between 2015 and 2021.

The venue was redeveloped at a cost of $6.3 million in late 2014 and early 2015, featuring new and improved club rooms, a high quality pitch and a covered grandstand seating up to 500 people. The total capacity is around 2,000 and the venue and broader facility is owned by the City of Merri-bek.
