= 2017 W-League grand final =

- Event: 2016–17 W-League
Perth Glory	Melbourne City
0	2
- Date: 12 February 2017
- Venue: nib Stadium, Perth, Western Australia
- Player of the Match: Jess Fishlock
- Referee: Kate Jacewicz
- Attendance: 4,591

The 2017 W-League grand final was the final match of the 2016–17 W-League season and decided the champions of women's football in Australia for the season.

The match took place at nib Stadium in Perth, Western Australia on 12 February 2017 and was played by Perth Glory and reigning league champions Melbourne City. The match was won by Melbourne City 0–2, who recorded their second consecutive league championship. The match marked the second time both clubs qualified for a Grand Final, Perth having lost in the 2014 final and Melbourne qualifying for their second consecutive final after winning the 2016 final. The player of the match award was won by Jessica Fishlock of Melbourne City. At the time, the attendance of 4,591 was a record for W-League grand finals.

== Teams ==
Team	Previous grand final appearances (bold indicates winners)
Melbourne City	1 (**2016**)
Perth Glory	1 (2014 (Dec))

== Route to the final ==
Perth Glory		Round	Melbourne City	
2nd place: Pos / Team / Pld / Pts; 1 / Canberra United / 12 / **23**; **2** / Perth Glory / **12** / **23**; 3 / Sydney FC / 12 / **22**; 4 / Melbourne City (C) / 12 / **20**; 5 / Newcastle Jets / 12 / **15**; Source: A-Leagues (C) Champions		Regular season	4th place: Pos / Team / Pld / Pts; 2 / Perth Glory / 12 / **23**; 3 / Sydney FC / 12 / **22**; **4** / Melbourne City (C) / **12** / **20**; 5 / Newcastle Jets / 12 / **15**; 6 / Adelaide United / 12 / **14**; Source: A-Leagues (C) Champions	
Opponent	Score		Opponent	Score
Sydney FC	5–1 (H)	Semi-finals	Canberra United	1–0 (a.e.t.) (A)

== Match details ==
12 February 2017
16:30 AWST

Perth Glory	0–2	Melbourne City
	Report	Fishlock 45+1'; Yanez 72'

nib Stadium, Perth
Attendance: 4,591
Referee: Kate Jacewicz

**Perth Glory**	**Melbourne City**

PERTH GLORY:
GK	18	(Australia) Gabrielle Dal Busco
DF	2	(Australia) Sarah Carroll (substituted off) 75'
DF	3	(Australia) Kim Carroll
DF	4	(United States) Alyssa Mautz
DF	7	(United States) Nikki Stanton
MF	9	(Australia) Rosie Sutton
MF	10	(United States) Vanessa DiBernardo (yellow card) 83'
MF	13	(Australia) Jaymee Gibbons (substituted off) 54'
MF	17	(Australia) Natasha Rigby
FW	20	(Australia) Samantha Kerr (c)
FW	22	(Mexico) Arianna Romero
Substitutes:
GK	1	(Australia) Melissa Maizels
DF	5	(Australia) Patricia Charalambous	(substituted in) 75'
MF	6	(Australia) Carla Bennett
MF	8	(Australia) Shawn Billam	(substituted in) 54'
MF	14	(Australia) Caitlin Doeglas
Manager:
(Australia) Bobby Despotovski

MELBOURNE CITY:
GK	1	(Australia) Lydia Williams
DF	2	(Australia) Teigen Allen
DF	3	(United States) Lauren Barnes
DF	5	(Australia) Laura Alleway
MF	6	(Australia) Aivi Luik
MF	7	(Australia) Steph Catley (c)
MF	10	(Wales) Jess Fishlock
MF	11	(United States) Erika Tymrak (substituted off) 90+4'
FW	13	(New Zealand) Rebekah Stott
FW	16	(United States) Beverly Yanez (substituted off) 87'
FW	17	(Australia) Marianna Tabain (yellow card) 66' (substituted off) 68'
Substitutes:
DF	12	(Australia) Olivia Ellis
FW	14	(Australia) Melina Ayres	(substituted in) 90+4'
MF	15	(Australia) Amy Jackson	(substituted in) 68'
DF	19	(Australia) Tyla-Jay Vlajnic	(substituted in) 87'
GK	20	(Australia) Emily Shields
Manager:
(Wales) Jessica Fishlock

== Match statistics ==
The following are the match statistics for the 2017 W-League grand final:

	Perth Glory	Melbourne City
Ball possession	45%	55%
Passes	385	495
Passing accuracy	67%	75%
Corners	7	1
Shots on goal	20	13
On target shots	6	3
Aerial duels won	67%	33%
Interceptions	29	27
Fouls	7	4
Yellow cards	1	1
Red cards	0	0
