= Tyla-Jay Vlajnić =

Serbian footballer (born 1990)

Tajla Džej Vlajnić
Personal information
- Birth name: Tyla-Jay Vlajnic
- Date of birth: 6 November 1990 (age 35)
- Place of birth: Australia
- Position: Defender

Senior career*
Years	Team	Apps	(Gls)
2015–2022	Melbourne City	55	(1)
2016	→ Calder United (loan)	23	(2)
2017	→ Bulleen Lions (loan)	30	(4)
2017	→ Seattle Sounders (loan)	7	(0)
2022-2023	Bulleen Lions	25	(10)
2022	Spartak Subotica	0	(0)
2022–2024	Western United	35	(3)
2024–2025	Melbourne City	22	(1)
2026–	South Melbourne		

International career^{‡}
2020–	Serbia	9	(0)
- * Club domestic league appearances and goals as of 5 September 2025 ‡ National team caps and goals as of 31 October 2023

Tajla Džej Vlajnić (Serbian Cyrillic: Таjла Џеj Влаjнић; born 6 November 1990) is a footballer who plays as a defender for National Premier Leagues Victoria Women (NPL Victoria Women) club South Melbourne. Born and raised in Australia to Serbian parents, she plays for the Serbia national team. She previously played for Melbourne City and Western United in the A-League Women, Calder United in the Women's National Premier League, Bulleen Lions in the National Premier Leagues Victoria Women, Seattle Sounders in the American Women's Premier Soccer League (WPSL), and for Spartak Subotica in the Serbian Women's Super League.

== Playing career ==
=== Melbourne City ===
During the 2015–16 W-League season, Vlajnić made one appearance during the team's 2–1 win over Melbourne Victory on 25 October 2015. During the match, she made a goal line save to prevent the Victory from scoring. Melbourne City finished in first place during the regular season with an undefeated 12–0–0 record. They won the 2016 W-League Grand Final after defeating Sydney FC 4–1.

After re-signing with the club for the 2016–17 W-League season, Vlajnić made nine appearances and helped the club finish the regular season in fourth place with a 6–4–2 record and advanced to the playoffs. The team won back-to-back Grand Finals after defeating Perth Glory in the 2017 W-League Grand Final.

Vlajnić re-signed with Melbourne City for the 2017–18 W-League season in September 2017.

In September 2022, it was announced that Vlajnić had departed Melbourne City after making 55 appearances in which the club won two premierships and four championships.

==== Loan to Seattle Sounders ====
During the summer of 2017, Vlajnić played for the Seattle Sounders in the Women's Premier Soccer League (WPSL) in the United States. She made seven appearances and helped the club finish in first place in the Northwest Conference with a 5–3–0 record.

=== Bulleen Lions ===
In March 2022, Vlajnić returned to Bulleen Lions. She left before the club's National Premier Leagues Victoria Women Final against Calder United, which they lost 2–0.

=== Spartak Subotica ===
In August 2022, Vlajnić signed with Serbian club Spartak Subotica. She debuted for the club as a substitute for the second half of their 2022–23 Champions League qualifying match against Brann which they lost 3–1.

=== Western United ===
In September 2022, Vlajnić joined new A-League Women expansion club Western United, looking forward to the challenge of an inaugural season. In September 2024, she left the club at the conclusion of her contract.

=== Return to Melbourne City ===
In September 2024, after two seasons away, Vlajnic returned to A-League Women club Melbourne City, signing a one-year contract. Following the end of the season, in September 2025, the club announced Vlajnic's departure after making 27 appearances for the club in all competitions.

== International goals ==
No.	Date	Venue	Opponent	Score	Result	Competition
1.	4 June 2024	Anton Malatinský Stadium, Trnava, Slovakia	Slovakia	2–0	4–0	UEFA Women's Euro 2025 qualifying

== Honours ==
Melbourne City

- A-League Women Championship: 2016, 2017
