= Amy Jackson (soccer) =

Australian soccer player

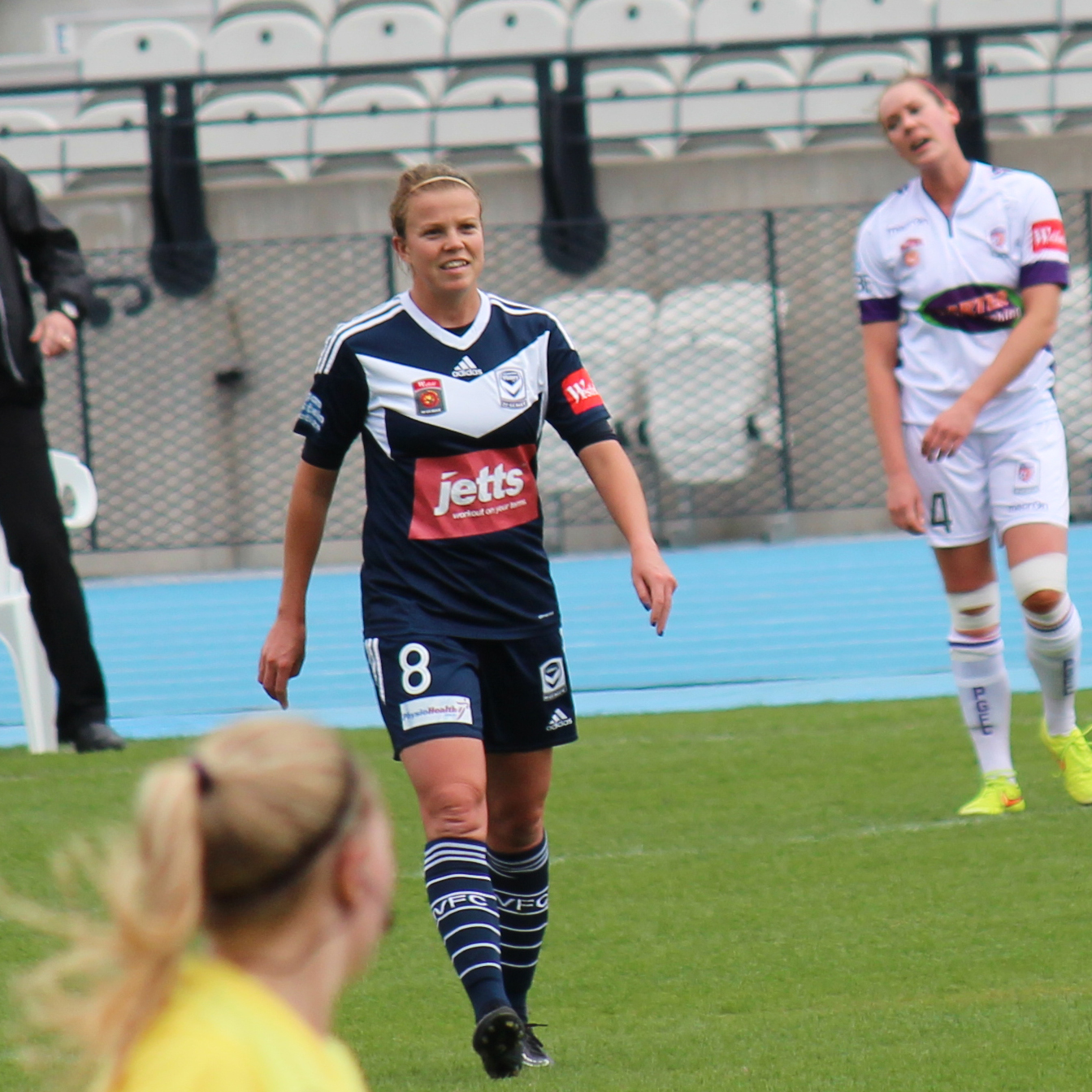
- Amy Jackson playing for Melbourne Victory against Perth Glory

Personal information
- Full name: Amy Elise Jackson
- Date of birth: 8 September 1987 (age 39)
- Place of birth: Altona, Victoria, Australia
- Height: 1.68 m (5 ft 6 in)
- Position: Midfielder

Youth career
- 2007–2010: FIU Panthers

Senior career*
Years	Team	Apps	(Gls)
2010–2013	Melbourne Victory	35	(5)
2014–2015	Melbourne Victory	12	(5)
2015–2019	Melbourne City	36	(1)
2016	Incheon Hyundai Steel Red Angels		
2019–2023	Melbourne Victory	33	(4)

International career^{‡}
2006	Australia U20	7	(3)
- * Club domestic league appearances and goals as of 29 February 2020 ‡ National team caps and goals as of 30 September 2015

Amy Elise Jackson (born 8 August 1987) is an Australian women's soccer midfielder who played for Melbourne Victory and the Boroondara Eagles in the Victorian Women's Premier League (WPL).

In the 2019–20 W-League season, Jackson won the goal of the year award for her round 7 goal against Perth Glory.

Jackson is Melbourne Victory's all-time record appearance holder and the club's second-highest goalscorer.

== Honours ==
Melbourne Victory

- W-League Player of the Week: October 2014
