= 2016 W-League grand final =

- Event: 2015–16 W-League
Melbourne City	Sydney FC
4	1
- Date: 31 January 2016
- Venue: AAMI Park, Melbourne, Victoria, Australia
- Player of the Match: Kim Little
- Referee: Kate Jacewicz
- Attendance: 4,206

The 2016 W-League grand final was the final match of the 2015–16 W-League season and decided the champions of women's football in Australia for the season.

The match took place at AAMI Park in Melbourne, Australia on 31 January 2016 and was played between league premiers Melbourne City and two-time premiers of the league Sydney FC. The match was won by Melbourne City 4–1 who competed the perfect season, failing to lose a match all season. It was also Melbourne City's first championship of any kind in Australian football and ensured the club won all available silverware in women's football in their inaugural season. Kim Little, playing for Melbourne City for the season on loan from Seattle Reign FC, was named the player of the match.

== Teams ==
Team	Previous grand final appearances (bold indicates winners)
Melbourne City	None
Sydney FC	3 (**2009 (Dec)**, 2011, **2013**)

== Route to the final ==
Melbourne City		Round	Sydney FC	
1st place: Pos / Team / Pld / Pts; **1** / Melbourne City (C) / **12** / **36**; 2 / Canberra United / 12 / **26**; 3 / Sydney FC / 12 / **19**; 4 / Brisbane Roar / 12 / **16**; 5 / Adelaide United / 12 / **13**; Source: A-Leagues (C) Champions		Regular season	3rd place: Pos / Team / Pld / Pts; 1 / Melbourne City (C) / 12 / **36**; 2 / Canberra United / 12 / **26**; **3** / Sydney FC / **12** / **19**; 4 / Brisbane Roar / 12 / **16**; 5 / Adelaide United / 12 / **13**; Source: A-Leagues (C) Champions	
Opponent	Score		Opponent	Score
Brisbane Roar	0–0 (5–4 p) (H)	Semi-finals	Canberra United	1–0 (A)

== Match details ==
31 January 2016
14:00 AEDT

Melbourne City	4–1	Sydney FC
Beattie 32'; Little 54'; Goad 80'; De Vanna 90+5'	Report	K. Simon 69' (pen.)

AAMI Park, Melbourne
Attendance: 4,206
Referee: Kate Jacewicz

**Melbourne City**	**Sydney FC**

MELBOURNE CITY:
GK	1	(Australia) Brianna Davey
DF	4	(Scotland) Jen Beattie (yellow card) 64'
DF	5	(Australia) Laura Alleway
DF	7	(Australia) Steph Catley
DF	13	(New Zealand) Rebekah Stott
MF	6	(Australia) Aivi Luik
MF	8	(Scotland) Kim Little
MF	10	(Wales) Jessica Fishlock (substituted off) 89'
MF	16	(Australia) Beattie Goad (substituted off) 86'
FW	9	(Australia) Larissa Crummer (substituted off) 67'
FW	11	(Australia) Lisa De Vanna (c)
Substitutes:
FW	17	(Australia) Marianna Tabain	(substituted on) 67'
MF	15	(Australia) Amy Jackson	(substituted on) 86'
MF	3	(Australia) Alex Chidiac	(substituted on) 89'
GK	20	(Australia) Trudy Burke
FW	18	(Mexico) Anisa Guajardo
Manager:
(Australia) Joe Montemurro

SYDNEY FC:
GK	1	(United States) Michelle Betos
DF	2	(Australia) Elizabeth Ralston
DF	11	(Australia) Natalie Tobin (yellow card) 26' (substituted off) 73'
DF	14	(Australia) Alanna Kennedy
DF	15	(Australia) Teigen Allen
MF	6	(Australia) Teresa Polias (c)
MF	7	(Australia) Nicola Bolger (substituted off) 83'
MF	5	(United States) Jasmyne Spencer
FW	9	(Australia) Princess Ibini-Isei (substituted off) 63'
FW	17	(Australia) Kyah Simon (yellow card) 53'
FW	19	(Australia) Leena Khamis
Substitutes:
MF	4	(Australia) Sunny Franco	(substituted on) 63'
MF	10	(Australia) Renee Rollason	(substituted on) 73'
DF	12	(Australia) Olivia Price	(substituted on) 83'
MF	16	(Australia) Hannah Bacon
GK	18	(Australia) Sham Khamis
Manager:
(Australia) Daniel Barrett

== Match statistics ==
The following are the match statistics for the 2016 W-League grand final:

	Melbourne City	Sydney FC
Ball possession	58%	42%
Passes	458	323
Passing accuracy	80.3%	76.8%
Corners	8	4
Shots on goal	13	9
On target shots	9	2
Aerial duels won	75%	25%
Interceptions	16	18
Fouls	7	13
Yellow cards	1	2
Red cards	0	0

== See also ==
- List of W-League champions
