= Melbourne City FC (women) =

Women's soccer team in Australia

Melbourne City (women)
- Founded: 13 May 2015; 11 years ago
- Ground: ctrl:cyber Pitch; AAMI Park (doubleheaders)
- Capacity: 1,500 (ctrl:cyber Pitch); 30,050 (AAMI Park)
- Owner: City Football Group
- Chairman: Khaldoon Al Mubarak
- Head Coach: Michael Matricciani
- League: A-League Women
- 2025–26: 1st of 11 (premiers)
- Website: http://www.melbournecityfc.com.au/
Home colours	Away colours	Third colours

Melbourne City Football Club (women) is the women's team of Melbourne City FC based in Cranbourne East, Victoria, Australia. They compete in the A-League Women, the top tier of Australian women's soccer and have won a league-leading five premierships and five championships as the most successful team in Australian women's soccer.

== History ==
Following on from their purchase of and investment into Manchester City in England, City Football Group turned their eyes to investment into the women's game as well, funding a serious overhaul of the Manchester club's female affiliate. Only months after their takeover of the men's team Melbourne City FC, they followed likewise on the women's side, contacting the FFA regarding entering a team into the W-League to be affiliated to the men's Melbourne side.

After a year of negotiations, their involvement was sealed with an announcement that a women's team competing under the name Melbourne City FC would compete in the W-League as of the beginning of the 2015–16 season.

=== Four championships and two premierships (2015–20) ===
Melbourne City CEO Scott Munn revealed that his club had been in consultation with Football Federation Australia (FFA) for over 12 months regarding the introduction of a new W-League side. In July 2015, Melbourne City Women's FC made Matildas co-captain Lisa De Vanna their first-ever signing. She is widely regarded as one of the world's best women's strikers. After De Vanna, the club's next foundation signings were Laura Alleway and Brianna Davey. In September 2015, Young Matildas Larissa Crummer, Alex Chidiac, Beattie Goad and former Adelaide United defender Monique Iannella joined the club. Matilda Steph Catley also signed up in September. Regarded as a Matildas' fan favourite, Catley created history when she was voted as the first female to appear on the cover of the video game FIFA 16.

The club created history in its inaugural 2015–16 season, winning all 12 of its regular season games to become Premiers (regular-season winners) and becoming Champions by winning the 2016 W-League grand final, completing a perfect season. In the following season, City suffered a six-match winless run during the middle part of the season before storming back into the finals series and claiming a second successive championship in the 2017 grand final. This achievement meant the club was equal with several other clubs for the greatest number of championships won in the league. The club then eclipsed this record the following season when it defeated Sydney FC in the 2018 W-League grand final making it 3 championships in a row.

City had an undefeated 2019–20 season, with 11 wins and one draw, and secured their second premiership. Under Head Coach Rado Vidošić, and with elite talent on the pitch such as the returning Steph Catley and new players Kyah Simon and Claire Emslie, the team went on to win the double following wins over Western Sydney Wanderers and Sydney FC in the 2020 Finals Series. Consequently, City became the first team in W-League history to secure four championships.

The club claimed its fifth championship in the 2025/26 season by defeating Wellington Phoenix 3-1 in the grand final at AAMI Park. The result came weeks after winning the league premiership as the highest-ranked team on the table, and coincided with a run to the Asian Women Champions League semi-final.

== Stadium ==
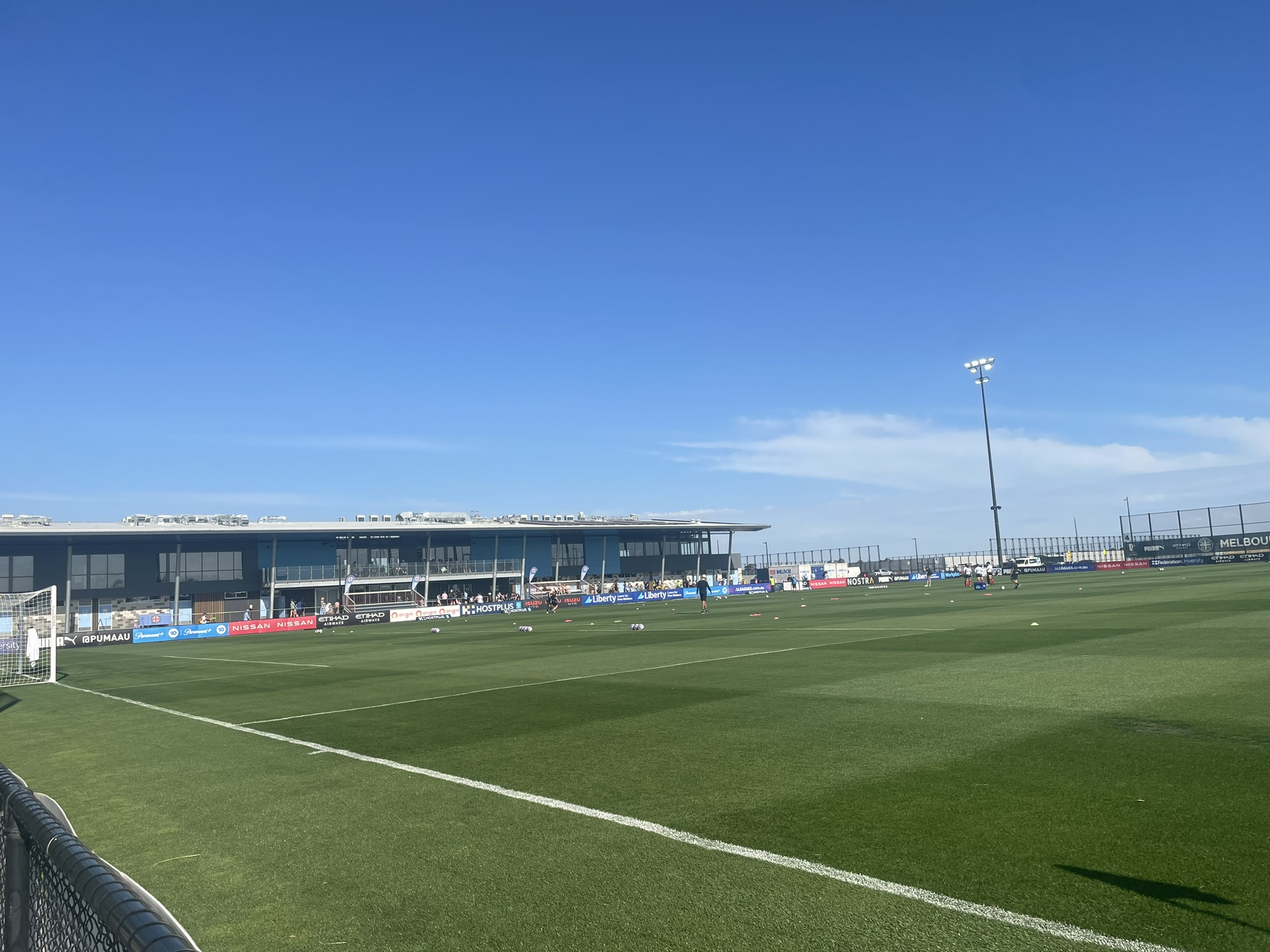
Melbourne City's women's team currently plays at ctrl:cyber Pitch in Cranbourne East.

Melbourne City's women's team played general home matches at CB Smith Reserve in Fawkner from 2015 to 2021. Doubleheaders are played at AAMI Park; the home venue of the men's team located in the Melbourne Sports and Entertainment Precinct. During the club's move to Casey Fields in Cranbourne East; in 2022, City's women's team moved to the Casey Fields oval for the 2022–23 season. The next season saw City move to ctrl:cyber Pitch; the main pitch of the newer City Football Academy in 2023. In March 2025, the club has proposed a new boutique rectangular stadium at Casey Fields with a $10.68 million funding commitment dependent on the outcome of the 2025 Australian federal election.

== Players ==
=== First-team squad ===
As of 16 October 2026

Note: Flags indicate national team as defined under FIFA eligibility rules; some limited exceptions apply. Players may hold more than one non-FIFA nationality.

No.	Pos.	Nation	Player
3	DF	ENG	Danielle Turner
4	DF	AUS	Jessika Nash
5	DF	AUS	Aimee Medwin
8	MF	JPN	Momo Hayashi
9	MF	AUS	Cortnee Vine
10	MF	AUS	Avaani Prakash
11	FW	NZL	Deven Jackson
12	MF	AUS	Shelby McMahon
13	DF	NZL	Rebekah Stott (captain)
14	FW	AUS	Melina Ayres
15	MF	AUS	Tully Heatley
16	DF	AUS	Karly Roestbakken
17	MF	AUS	Kaya Jugovic

No.	Pos.	Nation	Player
19	DF	AUS	Keira Sarris (youth)
20	FW	USA	Kelli McGroarty
21	FW	AUS	Aideen Keane
22	MF	AUS	Taylor Ray
23	GK	AUS	Melissa Barbieri
24	GK	ESP	Malena Mieres
25	GK	AUS	Dali Gorr-Burchmore (youth)
26	FW	AUS	Izabella Rako
27	DF	AUS	Chelsea Biggs (scholarship)
28	GK	AUS	Gemma Radipitse (youth)
29	MF	AUS	Layla Habib (youth)
—	FW	AUS	Princess Ibini

=== Notable former players ===
Below is a list of notable players for Melbourne City. Generally, this list includes former players that have played 50 or more first-class matches for the club, have at least one senior international cap, and/or have made significant contributions to the club's history. For a full list of current and former players see Melbourne City FC (women) players.

Australia

- Teigen Allen
- Laura Alleway
- Hannah Brewer
- Steph Catley
- Larissa Crummer
- Brianna Davey
- Lisa De Vanna
- Elise Kellond-Knight
- Alanna Kennedy
- Holly McNamara

Bosnia and Herzegovina

- Emina Ekic

Japan

- Yukari Kinga

Mexico

- Anisa Guajardo

Scotland

- Jen Beattie
- Claire Emslie
- Kim Little

United States

- Lauren Barnes
- Ashley Hatch
- Erika Tymrak

Wales

- Jess Fishlock

== Technical staff ==
Position	Name
Head coach	(Australia) Michael Matricciani
Assistant Coach	(Australia) Peter Kofinas
Goalkeeping Coach	(Australia) Ben Morella

== Honours ==
=== Domestic ===
Chart of yearly table positions for Melbourne City in A-League Women

- W-League/A-League Women Premiership:

Winners (5): 2015–16, 2019–20, 2023–24, 2024–25, 2025–26
Runners-up (1): 2021–22

- W-League/A-League Women Championship

Winners (5): 2016, 2017, 2018, 2020, 2026
Runners-up (1): 2024

=== Continental ===
- AFC Women's Champions League
  - Runners-up (1): 2024–25

== Continental record ==
Season	Competition	Round	Opponent	Home	Away	Aggregate
2024–25	AFC Champions League	Group B	(Iran) Bam Khatoon	2–1		1st
2024–25	AFC Champions League	Group B	(Thailand) College of Asian Scholars	3–0		1st
2024–25	AFC Champions League	Group B	(Philippines) Kaya–Iloilo	4–0		1st
2024–25	AFC Champions League	Quarter-finals	(Chinese Taipei) Taichung Blue Whale	3–0		
2024–25	AFC Champions League	Semi-finals	(South Korea) Incheon Red Angels	1–0		
2024–25	AFC Champions League	Final	(China) Wuhan Jianghan	1–1 (a.e.t.) (4–5 p)		
2025–26	AFC Champions League	Group A	(Singapore) Lion City Sailors FC	5–0		1st
2025–26	AFC Champions League	Group A	(Philippines) Stallion Laguna	7–0		1st
2025–26	AFC Champions League	Group A	(Vietnam) Hồ Chí Minh City	3–0		1st
2025–26	AFC Champions League	Quarter-finals	(Uzbekistan) Nasaf	2–1		
2025–26	AFC Champions League	Semi-finals	(Japan) Tokyo Verdy Beleza	1–3		
2026–27	AFC Champions League	Group C	(Uzbekistan) Nasaf	0–2		2nd
2026–27	AFC Champions League	Group C	(Philippines) Kaya–Iloilo	7–0		2nd
2026–27	AFC Champions League	Group C	(China) Beijing Jingtan	2–0		2nd
2026–27	AFC Champions League	Quarter-finals				

== See also ==
- List of top-division football clubs in AFC countries
- Women's soccer in Australia
- A-League Women records and statistics
- Australia women's national football team
