= W-League transfers for 2015–16 season =

This is a list of Australian soccer transfers for the 2015–16 W-League. Only moves featuring at least one W-League club are listed.

== Transfers ==
All players without a flag are Australian. Clubs without a flag are clubs participating in the W-League. All transfers between W-League clubs include a free transfer period in the off-season since prior to the 2017–18 season, the W-League didn't have multi-year contracts.

=== Pre-season ===
Date	Name	Moving from	Moving to
9 December 2014	(United States) Chantel Jones	Canberra United	(United States) Western New York Flash
20 December 2014	Elisa D'Ovidio	Perth Glory	Retired
21 December 2014	(United States) Lori Lindsey	Canberra United	Retired
28 January 2015	Tia Gavin	Western Sydney Wanderers	(United States) Washington State Cougars
29 March 2015	(Canada) Shelina Zadorsky	Perth Glory	(Sweden) Vittsjö GIK
31 March 2015	Racheal Quigley	Melbourne Victory	(Australia) Bulleen Lions
9 April 2015	Collette McCallum	Perth Glory	Retired
13 April 2015	Emma Stanbury	Newcastle Jets	(Australia) Manly United
11 May 2015	(Norway) Lisa-Marie Woods	Adelaide United	(Kazakhstan) BIIK Kazygurt
13 May 2015	(Germany) Nadine Angerer	Brisbane Roar	Retired
11 June 2015	Hayley Raso	Brisbane Roar	(United States) Washington Spirit
12 June 2015	Emily van Egmond	Newcastle Jets	(Germany) FFC Frankfurt
9 July 2015	Elise Kellond-Knight	Brisbane Roar	(Germany) Turbine Potsdam
10 July 2015	Lisa De Vanna	Melbourne Victory	Melbourne City
17 July 2015	Isabel Hodgson	Adelaide United	(United States) ETSU Buccaneers
12 August 2015	Casey Dumont	Sydney FC	Unattached
12 August 2015	Sunny Franco	Brisbane Roar	Sydney FC
12 August 2015	Princess Ibini	Unattached	Sydney FC
12 August 2015	Alanna Kennedy	Perth Glory	Sydney FC
12 August 2015	Sham Khamis	Western Sydney Wanderers	Sydney FC
14 August 2015	Laura Alleway	Brisbane Roar	Melbourne City
18 August 2015	Hannah Brewer	Melbourne Victory	(Australia) Valentine Phoenix
20 August 2015	Brianna Davey	Melbourne Victory	Melbourne City
24 August 2015	Kim Carroll	Brisbane Roar	Perth Glory
2 September 2015	Jada Whyman	(Australia) Macarthur Rams	Western Sydney Wanderers
4 September 2015	Larissa Crummer	Brisbane Roar	Melbourne City
4 September 2015	Alex Chidiac	Adelaide United	Melbourne City
4 September 2015	Beattie Goad	Melbourne Victory	Melbourne City
4 September 2015	Monique Iannella	Adelaide United	Melbourne City
14 September 2015	Grace Field	Canberra United	Unattached
14 September 2015	Sally Rojahn	Canberra United	Unattached
14 September 2015	Emma Checker	Melbourne Victory	Canberra United
16 September 2015	Grace Abbey	(Australia) FFSA NTC	Adelaide United
16 September 2015	Claudia Jenkins	(Australia) FFSA NTC	Adelaide United
16 September 2015	Matilda McNamara	(Australia) FFSA NTC	Adelaide United
16 September 2015	Marijana Rajcic	(Australia) Box Hill United	Adelaide United
17 September 2015	(United States) Stephanie Ochs	Canberra United	(United States) Houston Dash
17 September 2015	(Mexico) Verónica Pérez	(United States) Washington Spirit	Canberra United
17 September 2015	(New Zealand) Emma Kete	Unattached	Canberra United
17 September 2015	Jenna McCormick	Adelaide United	Canberra United
17 September 2015	Nickoletta Flannery	Unattached	Canberra United
17 September 2015	Lydia Williams	Unattached	Canberra United
17 September 2015	Steph Catley	Melbourne Victory (Note: Catley returned from loan to her parent club Portland Thorns before signing with Melbourne City)	Melbourne City
17 September 2015	(New Zealand) Rebekah Stott	(Germany) SC Sand	Melbourne City
17 September 2015	Trudy Burke	Western Sydney Wanderers	Melbourne City
17 September 2015	Marianna Tabain	Perth Glory	Melbourne City
17 September 2015	Ashlee Brodigan	Emerging Jets	Newcastle Jets
17 September 2015	Kobie Ferguson	Emerging Jets	Newcastle Jets
23 September 2015	Ellie Carpenter	(Australia) NSW Institute	Western Sydney Wanderers
24 September 2015	(United States) Michelle Betos	(United States) Portland Thorns	Sydney FC (loan)
25 September 2015	Chantelle Ryder	(Australia) Eastern Suburbs	Adelaide United
25 September 2015	Rosie Sutton	(Australia) Eastern Suburbs	Adelaide United
25 September 2015	Allira Toby	(Australia) Olympic FC	Adelaide United
25 September 2015	Lorena Maggio	(Australia) Western Pride	Adelaide United
25 September 2015	Eliza Ammendolia	(Australia) Macarthur Rams	Western Sydney Wanderers
25 September 2015	Liz Grey	(Australia) Sydney University	Western Sydney Wanderers
25 September 2015	Erica Halloway	(Australia) Illawarra Stingrays	Western Sydney Wanderers
25 September 2015	Teagan Micah	Brisbane Roar	Western Sydney Wanderers
25 September 2015	(Canada) Carmelina Moscato	(United States) Seattle Reign	Western Sydney Wanderers
25 September 2015	Tara Pender	(Australia) Blacktown Spartans	Western Sydney Wanderers
25 September 2015	Alix Roberts	(Australia) Blacktown Spartans	Western Sydney Wanderers
26 September 2015	Alexandra Gummer	Melbourne Victory	Adelaide United
26 September 2015	(United States) Sarah Killion	(United States) Sky Blue	Adelaide United (loan)
30 September 2015	Amy Jackson	Melbourne Victory	Melbourne City
1 October 2015	(United States) Abby Dahlkemper	(United States) Western New York Flash	Adelaide United (loan)
2 October 2015	(United States) Nikki Stanton	(United States) Sky Blue	Perth Glory (loan)
2 October 2015	Ruth Blackburn	(Australia) The Gap	Brisbane Roar
2 October 2015	Gabe Marzano	Perth Glory	Brisbane Roar
2 October 2015	Summer O'Brien	(Australia) The Gap	Brisbane Roar
2 October 2015	(Sweden) Sofie Persson	(Australia) Sunshine Coast	Brisbane Roar
3 October 2015	Vedrana Popovic	Brisbane Roar	Unattached
3 October 2015	Brooke Spence	Brisbane Roar	Unattached
3 October 2015	Alisha Foote	(Australia) Redlands United	Brisbane Roar
3 October 2015	Maili Forbes	(Australia) The Gap	Brisbane Roar
3 October 2015	(England) Carrie Simpson	(England) Bradford City	Brisbane Roar
3 October 2015	Ashley Spina	Newcastle Jets	Brisbane Roar
3 October 2015	Cortnee Vine	Unattached	Brisbane Roar
4 October 2015	MelindaJ Barbieri	(Australia) FFV NTC	Melbourne Victory
4 October 2015	Melissa Barbieri	Adelaide United	Melbourne Victory
4 October 2015	(United States) Brooke Elby	(United States) North Carolina Tar Heels	Melbourne Victory
4 October 2015	Whitney Knight	(Australia) FFV NTC	Melbourne Victory
4 October 2015	Selin Kuralay	Retirement	Melbourne Victory
4 October 2015	Annabel Martin	(Australia) FFV NTC	Melbourne Victory
4 October 2015	(New Zealand) Briar Palmer	(Australia) Ashburton United	Melbourne Victory
4 October 2015	Jessica Pitts	(Australia) Bundoora United	Melbourne Victory
4 October 2015	(United States) Jamie Pollock	(Australia) South Melbourne	Melbourne Victory
4 October 2015	Thea Slatyer	Retirement	Melbourne Victory
4 October 2015	Adriana Taranto	(Australia) FFV NTC	Melbourne Victory
4 October 2015	Melissa Taranto	(Australia) FFV NTC	Melbourne Victory
7 October 2015	Gema Simon	Melbourne Victory	Newcastle Jets
7 October 2015	(New Zealand) Hannah Bromley	(Australia) Northbridge	Newcastle Jets
7 October 2015	Adriana Jones	(Australia) Central Coast Mariners	Newcastle Jets
7 October 2015	Jenna Kingsley	Western Sydney Wanderers	Newcastle Jets
7 October 2015	Chloe Logarzo	Sydney FC	Newcastle Jets
8 October 2015	(United States) Caprice Dydasco	(United States) Washington Spirit	Newcastle Jets (loan)
8 October 2015	(United States) Megan Oyster	(United States) Washington Spirit	Newcastle Jets (loan)
8 October 2015	Aivi Luik (Note: Luik spent the off-season at Fylkir.)	Perth Glory	Melbourne City
8 October 2015	Hayley Raso	(United States) Washington Spirit	Melbourne Victory (loan)
8 October 2015	(England) Jodie Taylor	(United States) Portland Thorns	Canberra United (loan)
12 October 2015	(Wales) Jess Fishlock	(United States) Seattle Reign	Melbourne City (loan)
12 October 2015	(Scotland) Kim Little	(United States) Seattle Reign	Melbourne City (loan)
13 October 2015	Hayley Crawford	Newcastle Jets	Retired
13 October 2015	(United States) Katherine Reynolds	Newcastle Jets	(United States) Washington Spirit (Note: Reynolds and Salem were originally loaned to Newcastle Jets by Western New York Flash, but were traded to Washington Spirit during the 2014 season.)
13 October 2015	(United States) Angela Salem	Newcastle Jets	(United States) Washington Spirit
13 October 2015	(United States) Tori Huster	Newcastle Jets	(United States) Washington Spirit (end of loan)
13 October 2015	Amber Neilson	Newcastle Jets	Retired
13 October 2015	Grace Macintyre	Newcastle Jets	Unattached
13 October 2015	Renee Rudder	Newcastle Jets	(Australia) Moreton Bay United
13 October 2015	Danielle Brogan	Adelaide United	Perth Glory
13 October 2015	Ella Mastrantonio	Melbourne Victory	Perth Glory
14 October 2015	(United States) Haley Kopmeyer	(United States) Seattle Reign	Brisbane Roar (loan)
14 October 2015	(England) Kristy Moore	Adelaide United	Retired
14 October 2015	(Denmark) Katrine Pedersen	Adelaide United	Retired
14 October 2015	Dylan Holmes	Adelaide United	(United States) Colgate Raiders
14 October 2015	(England) Katie Holtham	Adelaide United	Perth Glory
14 October 2015	Rachel Alonso	Adelaide United	(Australia) Bundoora United
14 October 2015	Daila Tais-Borg	Adelaide United	Unattached
14 October 2015	Jessie Wharepouri	Adelaide United	(Australia) Northern Tigers
14 October 2015	(United States) Kaitlyn Savage	(New Zealand) Glenfield Rovers	Adelaide United
14 October 2015	(New Zealand) Elizabeth Milne	(New Zealand) Glenfield Rovers	Adelaide United
14 October 2015	Nora Peat	(Australia) FFSA NTC	Adelaide United
16 October 2015	(Mexico) Anisa Guajardo	(Australia) Heidelberg United	Melbourne City
16 October 2015	Melina Ayres	(Australia) Ashburton United	Melbourne City
16 October 2015	Olivia Ellis	(Australia) Boroondara Eagles	Melbourne City
16 October 2015	Holly Houston	Canberra United	Unattached
16 October 2015	Lyndsay Kohlet	(Australia) Bankstown City	Sydney FC
16 October 2015	Alesha Clifford	Sydney FC	(Australia) Marconi Stallions
16 October 2015	Alyssa Harris	Sydney FC	(Australia) Manly United
16 October 2015	(United States) Samantha Johnson	Sydney FC	(United States) Chicago Red Stars (end of loan)
16 October 2015	Heidi Makrillos	Sydney FC	(Australia) North West Sydney Koalas
16 October 2015	Servet Uzunlar	Sydney FC	(Australia) APIA Leichhardt
16 October 2015	Lorena Bugden	Western Sydney Wanderers	Unattached
16 October 2015	Victoria Guzman	Western Sydney Wanderers	(Australia) Sydney University
16 October 2015	Grace Henry	Western Sydney Wanderers	(Australia) Sydney University
16 October 2015	Caitlin Jarvie	Western Sydney Wanderers	(Australia) Marconi Stallions
16 October 2015	Rhianna Pollicina	Western Sydney Wanderers	(Australia) North West Sydney Koalas
16 October 2015	Jessica Seaman	Western Sydney Wanderers	(Australia) North West Sydney Koalas
17 October 2015	Jessica Au	Melbourne Victory	(Australia) Bundoora United
17 October 2015	(United States) Lauren Barnes	Melbourne Victory	(United States) Seattle Reign (end of loan)
17 October 2015	Tiffany Eliadis	Melbourne Victory	(Australia) South Melbourne
17 October 2015	Caitlin Friend	Melbourne Victory	(Australia) Bulleen Lions
17 October 2015	(United States) Elli Reed	Melbourne Victory	(United States) Seattle Reign (end of loan)
17 October 2015	(Wales) Carys Hawkins	Perth Glory	Unattached
17 October 2015	Bronwyn Studman	Perth Glory	(Australia) Canberra FC
17 October 2015	Kate Gill	Perth Glory	Retired
17 October 2015	Carla Bennett	(Australia) Northern Redbacks	Perth Glory
17 October 2015	Caitlin Doeglas	Unattached	Perth Glory
	Kate Stewart	Brisbane Roar	Retired

=== Mid-season ===
Date	Name	Moving from	Moving to
25 October 2015	Hannah Brewer	(Australia) Valentine Phoenix	Melbourne City
25 October 2015	Racheal Quigley	(Australia) Bulleen Lions	Melbourne City
25 October 2015	Tessa Sernio	(Australia) Bulleen Lions	Melbourne City
25 October 2015	Tyla-Jay Vlajnic	(Australia) Bundoora United	Melbourne City
30 October 2015	Hannah Brewer	Melbourne City	Unattached
30 October 2015	Racheal Quigley	Melbourne City	Unattached
30 October 2015	Tessa Sernio	Melbourne City	Unattached
30 October 2015	Tyla-Jay Vlajnic	Melbourne City	Unattached
30 October 2015	Erin Herd	Unattached	Melbourne City
30 October 2015	(Scotland) Jen Beattie	(England) Manchester City	Melbourne City (loan)
30 October 2015	(United States) Brooke Elby	Melbourne Victory	Unattached
30 October 2015	(United States) Georgia Cloepfil	(Australia) Ashburton United	Melbourne Victory
30 October 2015	Cindy Lay	Unattached	Melbourne Victory
5 November 2015	(England) Jodie Taylor	Canberra United	(United States) Portland Thorns (end of loan)
12 November 2015	(United States) Vanessa DiBernardo	(United States) Chicago Red Stars	Perth Glory (loan)
15 November 2015	(England) Natasha Dowie	(England) Liverpool	Melbourne Victory (loan)
26 December 2015	(United States) Georgia Cloepfil	Melbourne Victory	Unattached
1 January 2016	(England) Natasha Dowie	Melbourne Victory (Note: Dowie returned from loan to her parent club Liverpool before signing with Doncaster Rovers Belles)	(England) Doncaster Rovers Belles

== Re-signings ==
Date	Name	Club
23 July 2015	Michelle Heyman	Canberra United
12 August 2015	Teresa Polias	Sydney FC
12 August 2015	Kyah Simon	Sydney FC
12 August 2015	Nicola Bolger	Sydney FC
12 August 2015	Leena Khamis	Sydney FC
12 August 2015	Renee Rollason	Sydney FC
12 August 2015	Amy Harrison	Sydney FC
12 August 2015	Olivia Price	Sydney FC
12 August 2015	Natalie Tobin	Sydney FC
12 August 2015	(United States) Jasmyne Spencer	Sydney FC
12 August 2015	Teigen Allen	Sydney FC
12 August 2015	Elizabeth Ralston	Sydney FC
12 August 2015	Ellyse Perry	Sydney FC
12 August 2015	Trudy Camilleri	Sydney FC
17 August 2015	Clare Polkinghorne	Brisbane Roar
17 August 2015	Tameka Butt	Brisbane Roar
17 August 2015	Emily Gielnik	Brisbane Roar
17 August 2015	Katrina Gorry	Brisbane Roar
17 August 2015	Ayesha Norrie	Brisbane Roar
17 August 2015	Angela Beard	Brisbane Roar
19 August 2015	Sam Kerr	Perth Glory
20 August 2015	Caitlin Foord	Perth Glory
24 August 2015	Amy Chapman	Brisbane Roar
24 August 2015	Brooke Goodrich	Brisbane Roar
24 August 2015	Natasha Wheeler	Brisbane Roar
31 August 2015	Mackenzie Arnold	Perth Glory
6 September 2015	Tara Andrews	Newcastle Jets
6 September 2015	Claire Coelho	Newcastle Jets
6 September 2015	Libby Copus-Brown	Newcastle Jets
6 September 2015	Cassidy Davis	Newcastle Jets
6 September 2015	Rhali Dobson	Newcastle Jets
6 September 2015	Georgia Yeoman-Dale	Newcastle Jets
9 September 2015	Sarah Carroll	Perth Glory
9 September 2015	Thia Eastman	Perth Glory
9 September 2015	Shannon May	Perth Glory
16 September 2015	Lauren Steer	Adelaide United
16 September 2015	Tiarn Powell	Adelaide United
17 September 2015	Brooke Miller	Newcastle Jets
17 September 2015	Sophie Nenadovic	Newcastle Jets
17 September 2015	Hannah Southwell	Newcastle Jets
17 September 2015	Clare Wheeler	Newcastle Jets
17 September 2015	Nicole Begg	Canberra United
17 September 2015	Catherine Brown	Canberra United
17 September 2015	Ellie Brush	Canberra United
17 September 2015	Julia De Angelis	Canberra United
17 September 2015	(United States) Kendall Fletcher	Canberra United
17 September 2015	Grace Gill	Canberra United
17 September 2015	Rebecca Kiting	Canberra United
17 September 2015	Melissa Maizels	Canberra United
17 September 2015	Grace Maher	Canberra United
17 September 2015	Meg McLaughlin	Canberra United
17 September 2015	Caitlin Munoz	Canberra United
17 September 2015	Tegan Riding	Canberra United
17 September 2015	Ashleigh Sykes	Canberra United
25 September 2015	Jordan Baker	Western Sydney Wanderers
25 September 2015	(England) Hannah Beard	Western Sydney Wanderers
25 September 2015	Michelle Carney	Western Sydney Wanderers
25 September 2015	Caitlin Cooper	Western Sydney Wanderers
25 September 2015	(United States) Kendall Johnson	Western Sydney Wanderers
25 September 2015	Demi Koulizakis	Western Sydney Wanderers
25 September 2015	Chloe O'Brien	Western Sydney Wanderers
25 September 2015	Linda O'Neill	Western Sydney Wanderers
25 September 2015	Helen Petinos	Western Sydney Wanderers
25 September 2015	Rachael Soutar	Western Sydney Wanderers
25 September 2015	(United States) Keelin Winters	Western Sydney Wanderers
26 September 2015	Emily Condon	Adelaide United
26 September 2015	Georgia Campagnale	Adelaide United
4 October 2015	(United States) Christine Nairn	Melbourne Victory
4 October 2015	Enza Barilla	Melbourne Victory
4 October 2015	Cassandra Dimovski	Melbourne Victory
4 October 2015	(Turkey) Gülcan Koca	Melbourne Victory
4 October 2015	Alex Natoli	Melbourne Victory
4 October 2015	Laura Spiranovic	Melbourne Victory
13 October 2015	Gabby Dal Busco	Perth Glory
13 October 2015	Shawn Billam	Perth Glory
14 October 2015	Gabby Bentley	Adelaide United
