= W-League transfers for 2014 season =

This is a list of Australian soccer transfers for the 2014 W-League. Only moves featuring at least one W-League club are listed.

== Transfers ==
All players without a flag are Australian. Clubs without a flag are clubs participating in the W-League. All transfers between W-League clubs include a free transfer period in the off-season since prior to the 2017–18 season, the W-League didn't have multi-year contracts.

=== Pre-season ===
Date	Name	Moving from	Moving to
13 January 2014	(New Zealand) Katie Hoyle	Melbourne Victory	(England) Notts County
16 January 2014	(New Zealand) Anna Green	Sydney FC	(England) Notts County
27 January 2014	Caitlin Friend	Melbourne Victory	(England) Notts County
31 January 2014	Catherine Cannuli	Western Sydney Wanderers	Retired
3 February 2014	(United States) Camille Levin	Western Sydney Wanderers	(United States) Sky Blue
5 February 2014	Georgia Rowntree	Western Sydney Wanderers	(United States) Wyoming Cowgirls
8 February 2014	Joanne Burgess	Brisbane Roar	Retired
11 February 2014	(United States) Kendall Fletcher	Canberra United	(United States) Seattle Reign
21 February 2014	(New Zealand) Emma Kete	Sydney FC	(United States) Western New York Flash
27 February 2014	(Denmark) Cecilie Sandvej	Perth Glory	(United States) Washington Spirit
21 March 2014	Lydia Williams	Canberra United	(United States) Western New York Flash
22 April 2014	Sally Shipard	Canberra United	Retired
8 May 2014	Emily van Egmond	Western Sydney Wanderers	(United States) Chicago Red Stars
23 May 2014	(England) Laura Stockdale	Adelaide United	(Canada) Ottawa Fury
6 June 2014	Danielle Brogan	Sydney FC	(England) Notts County
9 June 2014	Teigen Allen	Western Sydney Wanderers	(United States) Western New York Flash
11 June 2014	Sneź Veljanovska	Adelaide United	Unattached
30 June 2014	Amy Knights	Perth Glory	Unattached
30 June 2014	Rosie Sutton	Perth Glory	Unattached
30 June 2014	Renee Tomkins	Western Sydney Wanderers	Unattached
24 July 2014	(United States) Chantel Jones	Perth Glory	Canberra United
24 July 2014	Melissa Maizels	Melbourne Victory	Canberra United
24 July 2014	Trudy Burke	Canberra United	Western Sydney Wanderers
31 July 2014	(England) Stacey Day	Newcastle Jets	Unattached
31 July 2014	Emily van Egmond	(United States) Chicago Red Stars	Newcastle Jets
31 July 2014	Amber Neilson	Retired	Newcastle Jets
1 August 2014	(Canada) Sasha Andrews	Perth Glory	Unattached
1 August 2014	(Canada) Shelina Zadorsky	(Canada) Ottawa Fury	Perth Glory
1 August 2014	(United States) Shawna Gordon	Western Sydney Wanderers	(Sweden) Umeå
6 August 2014	Mackenzie Arnold	Western Sydney Wanderers	Perth Glory
6 August 2014	Caitlin Foord (Note: Foord returned from loan to her parent club Sky Blue before joining Perth Glory.)	Sydney FC	Perth Glory
6 August 2014	Alanna Kennedy	Western Sydney Wanderers	Perth Glory
6 August 2014	Sam Kerr	Sydney FC	Perth Glory
13 August 2014	(Wales) Jess Fishlock	Melbourne Victory	(Germany) 1. FFC Frankfurt
13 August 2014	(England) Jodie Taylor	Sydney FC	(United States) Washington Spirit
13 August 2014	Ella Mastrantonio	Perth Glory	Melbourne Victory
14 August 2014	Hannah Brewer	Newcastle Jets	Melbourne Victory
14 August 2014	Gema Simon	Newcastle Jets	Melbourne Victory
14 August 2014	(Sweden) Jessica Samuelsson	Melbourne Victory	(Sweden) Linköping (end of loan)
15 August 2014	Hannah Southwell	Unattached	Newcastle Jets
15 August 2014	Emma Stanbury	Unattached	Newcastle Jets
15 August 2014	Georgia Yeoman-Dale	Canberra United	Newcastle Jets
16 August 2014	Alex Chidiac	(Australia) FFSA NTC	Adelaide United
19 August 2014	Rachel Alonso	(Australia) Bundoora United	Adelaide United
19 August 2014	Georgia Campagnale	(Australia) Adelaide City	Adelaide United
19 August 2014	Dylan Holmes	(Australia) FFSA NTC	Adelaide United
19 August 2014	Lauren Steer	(Australia) FFSA NTC	Adelaide United
26 August 2014	Amy Jackson	Unattached	Melbourne Victory
26 August 2014	Racheal Quigley	Adelaide United	Melbourne Victory
26 August 2014	(United States) Elli Reed	(United States) Seattle Reign	Melbourne Victory (loan)
26 August 2014	Hayley Crawford	Retired	Newcastle Jets
29 August 2014	(Denmark) Katrine Pedersen	Unattached	Adelaide United
29 August 2014	Teigen Allen	(United States) Western New York Flash	Sydney FC
29 August 2014	Alyssa Harris	(Australia) Manly United	Sydney FC
29 August 2014	(United States) Samantha Johnson	(United States) Chicago Red Stars	Sydney FC (loan)
29 August 2014	Kyah Simon	Western Sydney Wanderers	Sydney FC
29 August 2014	Servet Uzunlar	Western Sydney Wanderers	Sydney FC
2 September 2014	(United States) Christine Nairn	(United States) Washington Spirit	Melbourne Victory (loan)
4 September 2014	Julia De Angelis	Unattached	Canberra United
4 September 2014	Grace Maher	Unattached	Canberra United
4 September 2014	Rebecca Kiting	(United States) Quinnipiac Bobcats	Canberra United
5 September 2014	(United States) Jasmyne Spencer	(United States) Western New York Flash	Sydney FC (loan)
6 September 2014	Lorena Bugden	(Australia) FNSW Institute	Western Sydney Wanderers
6 September 2014	Tia Gavin	(Australia) FNSW Institute	Western Sydney Wanderers
6 September 2014	Victoria Guzman	(Australia) FNSW Institute	Western Sydney Wanderers
6 September 2014	Grace Henry	(Australia) Sydney University	Western Sydney Wanderers
6 September 2014	Caitlin Jarvie	(Australia) Northbridge FC	Western Sydney Wanderers
6 September 2014	Sham Khamis	Sydney FC	Western Sydney Wanderers
6 September 2014	Demi Koulizakis	(Australia) FNSW Institute	Western Sydney Wanderers
6 September 2014	Chloe O'Brien	(Australia) FNSW Institute	Western Sydney Wanderers
6 September 2014	Rhianna Pollicina	(Australia) FNSW Institute	Western Sydney Wanderers
7 September 2014	Erika Elze	Brisbane Roar	Unattached
7 September 2014	Angela Beard	(Australia) Queensland Academy of Sport	Brisbane Roar
7 September 2014	Teagan Micah	(Australia) Queensland Academy of Sport	Brisbane Roar
8 September 2014	(United States) Tori Huster	Western Sydney Wanderers (Note: Huster returned from loan to her parent club Washington Spirit before being loaned to Newcastle Jets.)	Newcastle Jets (loan)
8 September 2014	(United States) Katherine Reynolds	(United States) Western New York Flash	Newcastle Jets (loan)
8 September 2014	(United States) Angela Salem	(United States) Western New York Flash	Newcastle Jets (loan)
9 September 2014	(England) Hannah Beard	Newcastle Jets	Western Sydney Wanderers
10 September 2014	(England) Katie Holtham	(England) Notts County	Adelaide United
10 September 2014	Jessica Au	(Australia) South Melbourne	Melbourne Victory
10 September 2014	Alexandra Gummer	Adelaide United	Melbourne Victory
11 September 2014	Gabe Marzano	(Australia) The Gap	Perth Glory
11 September 2014	Katie Schubert	(Australia) Ashfield	Perth Glory
12 September 2014	Bianca Gray	Adelaide United	Unattached
12 September 2014	Tegan Riding	Adelaide United	Unattached
12 September 2014	Jayah Brown	Adelaide United	Unattached
12 September 2014	Jessica Waterhouse	Adelaide United	Unattached
12 September 2014	Daniela Di Bartolo	Adelaide United	Unattached
12 September 2014	Jessica Nagel	Adelaide United	Unattached
12 September 2014	Kelly Barltrop	Adelaide United	Unattached
12 September 2014	(Scotland) Louise Mason	Adelaide United	Unattached
12 September 2014	Sarah Willacy	(Australia) Adelaide City	Adelaide United
12 September 2014	Gaby Bently	(Australia) FFSA NTC	Adelaide United
12 September 2014	Jessica Humble	Melbourne Victory	Unattached
12 September 2014	Laura Spiranovic	Melbourne Victory	Unattached
12 September 2014	Cindy Lay	Melbourne Victory	Unattached
12 September 2014	Ashley Brown	Melbourne Victory	Unattached
12 September 2014	Enza Barilla	Melbourne Victory	Unattached
12 September 2014	Emily Hulbert	Melbourne Victory	Unattached
12 September 2014	Eliza Campbell	Newcastle Jets	(Norway) Medkila
12 September 2014	Siahn Bozanic	Newcastle Jets	Unattached
12 September 2014	(Republic of Ireland) Ciara McCormack	Newcastle Jets	Retired
12 September 2014	Madeline Searl	Newcastle Jets	Unattached
12 September 2014	Jasmin Courtenay	Newcastle Jets	Unattached
12 September 2014	Lauren Brown	Newcastle Jets	Unattached
12 September 2014	Ainsley Buchanan	Newcastle Jets	Unattached
12 September 2014	Adriana Jones	Newcastle Jets	Unattached
12 September 2014	Renee Rudder	(Australia) Sunshine Coast	Newcastle Jets
12 September 2014	Jessica Dillon	Perth Glory	(Canada) Toronto Lady Lynx
12 September 2014	Heidi Makrillos	(Australia) North West Sydney Koalas	Sydney FC
12 September 2014	Jenna Kinglsey	Western Sydney Wanderers	Unattached
12 September 2014	Dimi Poulos	Western Sydney Wanderers	Unattached
12 September 2014	Heather Garriock	Western Sydney Wanderers	Retired
12 September 2014	(United States) Keelin Winters	(United States) Seattle Reign	Western Sydney Wanderers (loan)

=== Mid-season ===
Date	Name	Moving from	Moving to
19 September 2014	(United States) Kendall Johnson	(United States) Sky Blue	Western Sydney Wanderers (loan)
4 October 2014	Tegan Riding	Unattached	Canberra United
18 October 2014	Danielle Brogan	Unattached	Adelaide United
24 October 2014	Tori Snelleksz	(Australia) Bundoora United	Melbourne Victory (loan)
25 October 2014	(United States) Kendall Fletcher	(United States) Seattle Reign	Canberra United (loan)
26 October 2014	Sian McLaren	(Australia) Sydney University	Sydney FC
6 November 2014	Caitlin Friend	(England) Notts County	Melbourne Victory
9 November 2014	Tori Snelleksz	Melbourne Victory	(Australia) Bundoora United (end of loan)
9 November 2014	Erin Herd	Unattached	Melbourne Victory
16 November 2014	Erin Herd	Melbourne Victory	Unattached
13 December 2014	(United States) Kendall Fletcher	Canberra United	(United States) Seattle Reign (end of loan)

== Re-signings ==
Date	Name	Club
29 April 2014	Tameka Butt (Note: Butt and Kellond-Knight spent the off-season at Iga FC.)	Brisbane Roar
29 April 2014	Elise Kellond-Knight	Brisbane Roar
18 June 2014	Clare Polkinghorne (Note: Polkinghorne spent the off-season at INAC Kobe Leonessa.)	Brisbane Roar
31 July 2014	Rhali Dobson	Newcastle Jets
6 August 2014	Kate Gill	Perth Glory
6 August 2014	Collette McCallum	Perth Glory
13 August 2014	Cassandra Dimovski	Melbourne Victory
13 August 2014	Maika Ruyter-Hooley	Melbourne Victory
15 August 2014	Tara Andrews	Newcastle Jets
16 August 2014	Melissa Barbieri	Adelaide United
16 August 2014	Emily Condon	Adelaide United
16 August 2014	Jenna McCormick	Adelaide United
16 August 2014	(England) Kristy Moore (Note: Moore spent the off-season at Ottawa Fury.)	Adelaide United
16 August 2014	Tiarn Powell	Adelaide United
19 August 2014	Daila Tais-Borg	Adelaide United
19 August 2014	Isabel Hodgson	Adelaide United
19 August 2014	Monique Iannella	Adelaide United
19 August 2014	Jessie Wharepouri	Adelaide United
19 August 2014	(Norway) Lisa-Marie Woods	Adelaide United
25 August 2014	Jordan Baker	Western Sydney Wanderers
25 August 2014	Michelle Carney	Western Sydney Wanderers
25 August 2014	Caitlin Cooper	Western Sydney Wanderers
26 August 2014	Emma Checker	Melbourne Victory
26 August 2014	Brianna Davey	Melbourne Victory
26 August 2014	Tiffany Eliadis	Melbourne Victory
26 August 2014	Beattie Goad	Melbourne Victory
26 August 2014	(Turkey) Gülcan Koca	Melbourne Victory
26 August 2014	Alex Natoli	Melbourne Victory
26 August 2014	Claire Coelho	Newcastle Jets
26 August 2014	Libby Copus-Brown	Newcastle Jets
26 August 2014	Cassidy Davis	Newcastle Jets
26 August 2014	Grace Macintyre	Newcastle Jets
26 August 2014	Sophie Nenadovic	Newcastle Jets
26 August 2014	Ashley Spina	Newcastle Jets
26 August 2014	Clare Wheeler	Newcastle Jets
27 August 2014	(United States) Lauren Barnes	Melbourne Victory
29 August 2014	Nicola Bolger	Sydney FC
29 August 2014	Trudy Camilleri	Sydney FC
29 August 2014	Alesha Clifford	Sydney FC
29 August 2014	Casey Dumont	Sydney FC
29 August 2014	Amy Harrison	Sydney FC
29 August 2014	Chloe Logarzo	Sydney FC
29 August 2014	Ellyse Perry	Sydney FC
29 August 2014	Teresa Polias	Sydney FC
29 August 2014	Olivia Price	Sydney FC
29 August 2014	Elizabeth Ralston	Sydney FC
29 August 2014	Renee Rollason	Sydney FC
29 August 2014	Natalie Tobin	Sydney FC
30 August 2014	Steph Catley (Note: During the off-season Catley joined Portland Thorns and then re-joined Melbourne Victory on loan.)	Melbourne Victory
4 September 2014	(Germany) Nadine Angerer (Note: During the off-season Angerer joined Portland Thorns and then re-joined Brisbane Roar on loan.)	Brisbane Roar
4 September 2014	Nicole Begg	Canberra United
4 September 2014	Catherine Brown	Canberra United
4 September 2014	Ellie Brush	Canberra United
4 September 2014	Grace Field	Canberra United
4 September 2014	Michelle Heyman	Canberra United
4 September 2014	Holly Houston	Canberra United
4 September 2014	(United States) Lori Lindsey	Canberra United
4 September 2014	Meg McLaughlin	Canberra United
4 September 2014	Caitlin Munoz	Canberra United
4 September 2014	(United States) Stephanie Ochs	Canberra United
4 September 2014	Sally Rojahn	Canberra United
4 September 2014	Ashleigh Sykes	Canberra United
4 September 2014	Lisa De Vanna (Note: De Vanna spent the off-season at Boston Breakers and Washington Spirit.)	Melbourne Victory
6 September 2014	Linda O'Neill	Western Sydney Wanderers
6 September 2014	Helen Petinos	Western Sydney Wanderers
6 September 2014	Jessica Seaman	Western Sydney Wanderers
6 September 2014	Rachael Soutar	Western Sydney Wanderers
7 September 2014	Laura Alleway	Brisbane Roar
7 September 2014	Amy Chapman	Brisbane Roar
7 September 2014	Brooke Spence	Brisbane Roar
7 September 2014	Hayley Raso	Brisbane Roar
7 September 2014	Kim Carroll	Brisbane Roar
7 September 2014	Larissa Crummer	Brisbane Roar
7 September 2014	Katrina Gorry (Note: Gorry spent the off-season at FC Kansas City.)	Brisbane Roar
7 September 2014	Vedrana Popovic	Brisbane Roar
7 September 2014	Natasha Wheeler	Brisbane Roar
7 September 2014	Brooke Goodrich	Brisbane Roar
7 September 2014	Emily Gielnik	Brisbane Roar
7 September 2014	Sunny Franco	Brisbane Roar
7 September 2014	Ayesha Norrie	Brisbane Roar
7 September 2014	Kate Stewart	Brisbane Roar
11 September 2014	Sarah Carroll	Perth Glory
11 September 2014	Elisa D'Ovidio	Perth Glory
11 September 2014	Shannon May	Perth Glory
11 September 2014	Marianna Tabain	Perth Glory
1 October 2014	Kathleen Waycott	Perth Glory
1 October 2014	(Wales) Carys Hawkins (Note: Hawkins spent the off-season at Fylkir.)	Perth Glory
