= 2015–16 Canberra United FC (women) season =

8th season in existence of Canberra United FC

Canberra United
2015–16 season
- Chairman: Kate Lundy
- Head Coach: Rae Dower
- Stadium: McKellar Park
- W-League: 2nd
- W-League Finals: Semi-finals
- Top goalscorer: League: Ashleigh Sykes (6); All: Ashleigh Sykes (6)
- Highest home attendance: 2,131 vs. Sydney FC (24 January 2016); W-League Finals
- Lowest home attendance: 667 vs. Melbourne Victory (19 December 2015); W-League
- Average home league attendance: 1,000
- Biggest win: 4–0 vs. Adelaide United (12 December 2015); W-League
- Biggest defeat: 2–4 vs. Melbourne City (8 November 2015); W-League

The 2015–16 season was Canberra United Football Club's eighth season in the W-League.

== Players ==
=== First-team squad ===
Note: Flags indicate national team as defined under FIFA eligibility rules; some limited exceptions apply. Players may hold more than one non-FIFA nationality.

No.	Pos.	Nation	Player
1	GK	AUS	Lydia Williams
2	DF	AUS	Catherine Brown
3	MF	AUS	Julia De Angelis
4	DF	USA	Kendall Fletcher
5	DF	AUS	Jenna McCormick
6	MF	AUS	Caitlin Munoz
7	DF	AUS	Ellie Brush
8	FW	AUS	Meg McLaughlin
9	MF	AUS	Grace Gill-McGrath
10	DF	AUS	Grace Maher
11	FW	AUS	Michelle Heyman

No.	Pos.	Nation	Player
12	FW	NZL	Emma Kete
13	DF	AUS	Nicole Sykes
14	FW	AUS	Ashleigh Sykes
15	DF	AUS	Emma Checker
16	FW	AUS	Tegan Riding
17	MF	MEX	Verónica Pérez
18	DF	AUS	Rebecca Kiting
19	FW	AUS	Nickoletta Flannery
20	GK	AUS	Melissa Maizels
22	GK	AUS	Georgia Boric

== Transfers and contracts ==
=== Transfers in ===
No.	Position	Player	Transferred from	Type/fee	Date	Ref.
15	DF	Emma Checker	Melbourne Victory	Free transfer	14 September 2015	
1	GK	Lydia Williams	Unattached	Free transfer	17 September 2015	
5	DF	Jenna McCormick	Adelaide United	Free transfer	17 September 2015	
12	FW	(New Zealand) Emma Kete	Unattached	Free transfer	17 September 2015	
17	MF	(Mexico) Verónica Pérez	(United States) Washington Spirit	Free transfer	17 September 2015	
19	FW	Nickoletta Flannery	Unattached	Free transfer	17 September 2015	
—	FW	(England) Jodie Taylor	(United States) Portland Thorns	Loan	8 October 2015	

=== Transfers out ===
No.	Position	Player	Transferred to	Type/fee	Date	Ref.
1	GK	(United States) Chantel Jones	(United States) Western New York Flash	Free transfer	9 December 2014	
16	MF	(United States) Lori Lindsey	Retired		21 December 2014	
5	DF	Grace Field	Unattached	Free transfer	14 September 2015	
12	DF	Sally Rojahn	Unattached	Free transfer	14 September 2015	
22	DF	(United States) Stephanie Ochs	(United States) Houston Dash	Free transfer	17 September 2015	
17	DF	Holly Houston	Unattached	Free transfer	16 October 2015	
—	FW	(England) Jodie Taylor	(United States) Portland Thorns	Loan return	5 November 2015	

=== Contract extensions ===
No.	Position	Player	Duration	Date	Ref.
11	FW	Michelle Heyman	1 year	23 July 2015	

== Pre-season and friendlies ==
6 January 2016	Canberra United (Australia)	13–0	Singapore	Canberra
	Pérez 12'; Kete 26'; Sykes 37', 42', 56', 65'; Fletcher 50' (pen.); McLaughlin 70', 71', 76'; Riding 73'; Maher 80'; Flannery 85'	Report		Stadium: Australian Institute of Sport; Attendance: 200

== Competitions ==
=== Overall record ===
Competition	First match	Last match	Starting round	Final position	Record							
Competition	First match	Last match	Starting round	Final position	Pld	W	D	L	GF	GA	GD	Win %
W-League	18 October 2015	15 January 2016	Matchday 1	2nd	12	8	2	2	26	8	+18	66.67
W-League Finals	24 January 2016		Semi-finals	Semi-finals	1	0	0	1	0	1	−1	0.00
Total					13	8	2	3	26	9	+17	61.54

Source: Competitions

=== W-League ===
==== League table ====
Pos	Team	Pld	W	D	L	GF	GA	GD	Pts	Qualification
1	Melbourne City (C)	12	12	0	0	38	4	+34	36	Qualification to Finals series
2	Canberra United	12	8	2	2	26	8	+18	26	Qualification to Finals series
3	Sydney FC	12	6	1	5	15	21	−6	19	Qualification to Finals series
4	Brisbane Roar	12	5	1	6	16	17	−1	16	Qualification to Finals series
5	Adelaide United	12	3	4	5	18	19	−1	13	
6	Newcastle Jets	12	3	4	5	9	12	−3	13	
7	Western Sydney Wanderers	12	3	3	6	15	25	−10	12	
8	Perth Glory	12	3	2	7	10	23	−13	11	
9	Melbourne Victory	12	2	1	9	10	28	−18	7	

Source: A-Leagues
Rules for classification: 1) points; 2) goal difference; 3) number of goals scored.
(C) Champions

==== Results summary ====
Overall								Home						Away					
Pld	W	D	L	GF	GA	GD	Pts	W	D	L	GF	GA	GD	W	D	L	GF	GA	GD
12	8	2	2	26	8	+18	26	5	0	1	17	4	+13	3	2	1	9	4	+5

Source: worldfootball.net

==== Results by round ====
Round	1	2	3	4	5	6	7	8	9	10	11	12	13	14
Ground	A	H	B	H	A	A	A	H	H	H	B	A	H	A
Result	L	W	X	L	D	W	W	W	W	W	X	W	W	D
Position	7	4	6	8	8	3	2	2	2	2	2	2	2	2
Points	0	3	3	3	4	7	10	13	16	19	19	22	25	26

Source: worldfootball.net
A = Away; H = Home; B = Bye; W = Win; D = Draw; L = Loss; X = Bye

==== Matches ====
Win Draw Loss

18 October 2015 1	Brisbane Roar	2–1	Canberra United	Brisbane
13:00 AEST	Butt 8'; Blackburn 11'	Report	Heyman 39'	Stadium: Suncorp Stadium; Attendance: 14,471; Referee: Kate Jacewicz

24 October 2015 2	Canberra United	3–0	Sydney FC	Canberra
16:00 AEDT	Sykes 9'; Pérez 58'; Munoz 68'	Report		Stadium: McKellar Park; Attendance: 1,009; Referee: Rachael Mitchenson

8 November 2015 4	Canberra United	2–4	Melbourne City	Gosford
14:00 AEDT	Sykes 29'; Heyman 60'	Report	Tabain 5'; Crummer 11'; Luik 41'; Little 87'	Stadium: Central Coast Stadium; Attendance: 1,233; Referee: Lara Lee

14 November 2015 5	Newcastle Jets	0–0	Canberra United	Newcastle
14:00 AEDT		Report		Stadium: Wanderers Oval; Attendance: 856; Referee: Kate Jacewicz

22 November 2015 6	Sydney FC	0–1	Canberra United	Sydney
16:00 AEDT		Report	Sykes 88'	Stadium: Lambert Park; Attendance: 710; Referee: Casey Reibelt

29 November 2015 7	Western Sydney Wanderers	1–4	Canberra United	Gosford
14:00 AEDT	Halloway 77'	Report	Fletcher 14', 79'; Soutar 53' (o.g.); Sykes 83'	Stadium: Central Coast Stadium; Referee: Kelly Jones

5 December 2015 8	Canberra United	2–0	Brisbane Roar	Canberra
15:00 AEDT	Sykes 45', 60'	Report		Stadium: McKellar Park; Attendance: 925; Referee: Casey Reibelt

12 December 2015 9	Canberra United	4–0	Adelaide United	Canberra
16:00 AEDT	Heyman 9'; McCormick 15'; Heyman 84'; Pérez 90+3'	Report		Stadium: McKellar Park; Attendance: 887; Referee: Kelly Jones

19 December 2015 10	Canberra United	3–0	Melbourne Victory	Canberra
17:00 AEDT	McCormick 47'; Sykes 56'; Heyman 81'	Report		Stadium: McKellar Park; Attendance: 667; Referee: Lara Lee

2 January 2016 12	Perth Glory	0–2	Canberra United	Perth
16:00 AWST		Report	Brush 22'; Sykes 87'	Stadium: Ashfield Arena; Attendance: 395; Referee: Casey Reibelt

10 January 2016 13	Canberra United	3–0	Western Sydney Wanderers	Canberra
16:00 AEDT	Munoz 6'; Kiting 11'; Pérez 58'	Report		Stadium: McKellar Park; Attendance: 1,281; Referee: Rebecca Durcau

15 January 2016 14	Adelaide United	1–1	Canberra United	Adelaide
19:00 ACDT	Dahlkemper 43'	Report	Pérez 23' (pen.)	Stadium: West Beach Parks Football Centre; Referee: Casey Reibelt

==== Finals series ====
24 January 2016 Semi-finals	Canberra United	0–1	Sydney FC	Canberra
14:00 AEDT		Report	Spencer 62'	Stadium: McKellar Park; Attendance: 2,131; Referee: Casey Reibelt

== Statistics ==
=== Appearances and goals ===
Includes all competitions. Players with no appearances not included in the list.

No.	Pos	Nat	Player	Total		W-League		W-League Finals	
No.	Pos	Nat	Player	Apps	Goals	Apps	Goals	Apps	Goals
1	GK	(Australia) AUS	Lydia Williams	10	0	9	0	1	0
20	GK	(Australia) AUS	Melissa Maizels	3	0	3	0	0	0
2	DF	(Australia) AUS	Catherine Brown	3	0	1+2	0	0	0
4	DF	(United States) USA	Kendall Fletcher	13	2	12	2	1	0
5	DF	(Australia) AUS	Jenna McCormick	11	2	10	2	1	0
7	DF	(Australia) AUS	Ellie Brush	13	1	12	1	1	0
10	DF	(Australia) AUS	Grace Maher	1	0	1	0	0	0
13	DF	(Australia) AUS	Nicole Sykes	12	2	11	2	1	0
15	DF	(Australia) AUS	Emma Checker	8	0	8	0	0	0
18	DF	(Australia) AUS	Rebecca Kiting	13	1	11+1	1	1	0
3	MF	(Australia) AUS	Julia De Angelis	11	0	5+5	0	1	0
6	MF	(Australia) AUS	Caitlin Munoz	11	2	10	2	1	0
9	MF	(Australia) AUS	Grace Gill-McGrath	3	0	0+3	0	0	0
17	MF	(Mexico) MEX	Verónica Pérez	11	4	11	4	0	0
8	FW	(Australia) AUS	Meg McLaughlin	9	0	3+5	0	1	0
11	FW	(Australia) AUS	Michelle Heyman	10	5	9	5	1	0
12	FW	(Australia) AUS	Emma Kete	6	0	3+2	0	0+1	0
14	FW	(Australia) AUS	Ashleigh Sykes	13	6	12	6	1	0
16	FW	(Australia) AUS	Tegan Riding	8	0	1+7	0	0	0
19	FW	(Australia) AUS	Nickoletta Flannery	6	0	0+5	0	0+1	0

=== Disciplinary record ===
Includes all competitions. The list is sorted by squad number when total cards are equal. Players with no cards not included in the list.

Rank	No.	Pos.	Nat.	Name	W-League			W-League Finals			Total							
Rank	No.	Pos.	Nat.	Name	Yellow card	(yellow card) (yellow-red card)	Red card	Yellow card	(yellow card) (yellow-red card)	Red card	Yellow card	(yellow card) (yellow-red card)	Red card					
Rank	No.	Pos.	Nat.	Name	1	3	MF	(Australia)	Julia De Angelis	2	0	0	1	0	0	3	0	0
2	6	MF	(Australia)	Caitlin Munoz	2	0	0	0	0	0	2	0	0					
2	17	MF	(Mexico)	Verónica Pérez	2	0	0	0	0	0	2	0	0					
4	1	GK	(Australia)	Lydia Williams	0	0	0	1	0	0	1	0	0					
4	4	DF	(United States)	Kendall Fletcher	0	0	0	1	0	0	1	0	0					
4	12	FW	(Australia)	Emma Kete	1	0	0	0	0	0	1	0	0					
4	13	DF	(Australia)	Nicole Sykes	1	0	0	0	0	0	1	0	0					
4	14	FW	(Australia)	Ashleigh Sykes	1	0	0	0	0	0	1	0	0					
4	15	DF	(Australia)	Emma Checker	1	0	0	0	0	0	1	0	0					
4	18	DF	(Australia)	Rebecca Kiting	1	0	0	0	0	0	1	0	0					
Total					11	0	0	3	0	0	14	0	0					

=== Clean sheets ===
Includes all competitions. The list is sorted by squad number when total clean sheets are equal. Numbers in parentheses represent games where both goalkeepers participated and both kept a clean sheet; the number in parentheses is awarded to the goalkeeper who was substituted on, whilst a full clean sheet is awarded to the goalkeeper who was on the field at the start of play. Goalkeepers with no clean sheets not included in the list.

Rank	No.	Nat.	Goalkeeper	W-League		Total
Rank	No.	Nat.	Goalkeeper	Regular season	Finals series	Total
1	1	(Australia)	Lydia Williams	6	0	6
2	20	(Australia)	Melissa Maizels	2	0	2
Total				8	0	8
