= 2014 Canberra United FC (women) season =

Canberra United FC
2014 season
- Chairman: Kate Lundy
- Manager: Liesbeth Migchelsen
- Stadium: McKellar Park
- W-League: 3rd
- W-League Finals series: Champions
- Top goalscorer: League: Michelle Heyman (6); All: Michelle Heyman, Ashleigh Sykes (6)
| Home colours | Away colours |

The 2014 Canberra United FC season was the club's seventh participation in the W-League, since the league's formation in 2008.

== Players ==
=== Squad information ===
Note: Flags indicate national team as defined under FIFA eligibility rules; some limited exceptions apply. Players may hold more than one non-FIFA nationality.

| No. | Pos. | Nation | Player |
|---|---|---|---|
| 1 | GK | (United States) USA | Chantel Jones |
| 2 | DF | (Australia) AUS | Catherine Brown |
| 3 | MF | (Australia) AUS | Julia De Angelis |
| 4 | MF | (United States) USA | Kendall Fletcher (Guest player) |
| 5 | DF | (Australia) AUS | Grace Field |
| 6 | MF | (Australia) AUS | Caitlin Munoz |
| 7 | DF | (Australia) AUS | Ellie Brush (Vice-Captain) |
| 8 | FW | (Australia) AUS | Meg McLaughlin |
| 9 | MF | (Australia) AUS | Grace Gill |
| 10 | MF | (Australia) AUS | Grace Maher |
| 11 | FW | (Australia) AUS | Michelle Heyman |

| No. | Pos. | Nation | Player |
|---|---|---|---|
| 12 | DF | (Australia) AUS | Sally Rojahn |
| 13 | DF | (Australia) AUS | Nicole Begg (Captain) |
| 14 | FW | (Australia) AUS | Ashleigh Sykes |
| 16 | MF | (United States) USA | Lori Lindsey |
| 17 | DF | (Australia) AUS | Holly Houston |
| 18 | DF | (Australia) AUS | Rebecca Kiting |
| 19 | MF | (Australia) AUS | Jennifer Bisset |
| 20 | GK | (Australia) AUS | Melissa Maizels |
| 22 | FW | (United States) USA | Stephanie Ochs |
| – | GK | (Australia) AUS | Lydia Williams |

=== Transfers in ===
Note: Flags indicate national team as defined under FIFA eligibility rules; some limited exceptions apply. Players may hold more than one non-FIFA nationality.

| No. | Pos. | Nation | Player |
|---|---|---|---|
| 1 | GK | (United States) USA | Chantel Jones (from (United States) Washington Spirit) |
| 20 | GK | (Australia) AUS | Melissa Maizels (from (Australia) Melbourne Victory) |
| 4 | MF | (United States) USA | Kendall Fletcher (from (United States) Seattle Reign FC - guest player) |
| 3 | MF | (Australia) AUS | Julia De Angelis (from (Australia) ACTAS) |
| 10 | MF | (Australia) AUS | Grace Maher (from (Australia) ACTAS) |
| 18 | DF | (Australia) AUS | Rebecca Kiting |

=== Transfers out ===
Note: Flags indicate national team as defined under FIFA eligibility rules; some limited exceptions apply. Players may hold more than one non-FIFA nationality.

| No. | Pos. | Nation | Player |
|---|---|---|---|
| 4 | MF | (United States) USA | Kendall Fletcher (to (United States) Seattle Reign FC) |
| 15 | MF | (Australia) AUS | Sally Shipard (Retired) |
| 20 | GK | (Australia) AUS | Trudy Burke (to (Australia) Western Sydney Wanderers) |
| 3 | MF | (Australia) AUS | Georgia Yeoman-Dale (to (Australia) Newcastle Jets) |

== Technical staff ==
| Position | Name |
|---|---|
| Head coach | (Netherlands) Liesbeth Migchelsen |
| Assistant coach | (Australia) Raeanne Dower |

== Competitions ==
=== W-League ===
==== Fixtures ====
| 14 September 2014 1 | Western Sydney Wanderers | 1 – 4 | Canberra United | Campbelltown |
| 15:00 AEST | Koulizakis 89' | Report | Heyman 3', 41'; Brush 57'; Munoz 75' | Stadium: Campbelltown Stadium; Attendance: 384; Referee: Rebecca Durcau |

| 21 September 2014 2 | Adelaide United | 0 – 1 | Canberra United | Adelaide |
| 14:30 ACST | | Report | Ochs 61' | Stadium: Adelaide Shores Football Centre; Referee: Katie Patterson |

| 28 September 2014 3 | Canberra United | 2 – 4 | Melbourne Victory | Canberra |
| 15:00 AEST | Lindsey 59'; Munoz 80' | Report | Barnes 38' (pen.); Catley 42'; De Vanna 48'; Simon 68' | Stadium: McKellar Park; Attendance: 1,018; Referee: Casey Reibelt |

| 4 October 2014 4 | Canberra United | 2 – 0 | Brisbane Roar | Canberra |
| 17:00 AEST | Field 36'; Kellond-Knight 57' (o.g.) | Report | | Stadium: McKellar Park; Attendance: 762; Referee: Rachel Mitchenson |

| 11 October 2014 5 | Perth Glory | 3 – 0 | Canberra United | Perth |
| 16:00 AWST | Zadorsky 14'; K. Gill 63' (pen.), 80' | Report | | Stadium: Ashfield Reserve; Referee: Kirralee Andruschak |

| 19 October 2014 6 | Canberra United | 2 – 3 | Adelaide United | Canberra |
| 15:00 AEDT | Heyman 47'; Munoz 75' | Report | Moore 43', 60'; Powell 76' | Stadium: McKellar Park; Attendance: 794; Referee: Lara Smith |

| 25 October 2014 7 | Melbourne Victory | 0 – 1 | Canberra United | Melbourne |
| 16:30 AEDT | | Report | Sykes 29' | Stadium: Etihad Stadium; Attendance: 14,068; Referee: Kelly Jones |

| 1 November 2014 8 | Canberra United | 1 – 1 | Western Sydney Wanderers | Canberra |
| 17:00 AEDT | Brush 90' | Report | Beard 10' | Stadium: McKellar Park; Attendance: 657; Referee: Lara Smith |

| 9 November 2014 9 | Canberra United | 3 – 0 | Sydney FC | Canberra |
| 15:00 AEDT | Rojahn 22'; Heyman 40'; Ochs 76' | Report | | Stadium: McKellar Park; Attendance: 864; Referee: Rebecca Durcau |

| 15 November 2014 10 | Newcastle Jets | 3 – 3 | Canberra United | Newcastle |
| 15:00 AEDT | Salem 7'; Dobson 68'; Andrews 89' | Report | Reynolds 13' (o.g.); Heyman 25'; Sykes 87' | Stadium: Wanderers Oval; Attendance: 627 |

| 29 November 2014 11 | Brisbane Roar | 2 – 1 | Canberra United | Brisbane |
| 13:00 AEST | Butt 40'; Gorry 47' | Report | Sykes 28' | Stadium: Suncorp Stadium |

| 7 December 2014 12 | Canberra United | 2 – 1 | Perth Glory | Canberra |
| 15:00 AEDT | Heyman 68'; Sykes 86' | Report | Kerr 52' | Stadium: Viking Park; Referee: Rebecca Durcau |

==== League table ====
| Pos | Team | Pld | W | D | L | GF | GA | GD | Pts | Qualification |
|---|---|---|---|---|---|---|---|---|---|---|
| 1 | Perth Glory | 12 | 10 | 0 | 2 | 39 | 10 | +29 | 30 | Qualification to Finals series |
| 2 | Melbourne Victory | 12 | 6 | 2 | 4 | 26 | 15 | +11 | 20 | Qualification to Finals series |
| 3 | Canberra United (C) | 12 | 6 | 2 | 4 | 22 | 18 | +4 | 20 | Qualification to Finals series |
| 4 | Sydney FC | 12 | 5 | 3 | 4 | 17 | 16 | +1 | 18 | Qualification to Finals series |
| 5 | Newcastle Jets | 12 | 5 | 2 | 5 | 25 | 21 | +4 | 17 | |
| 6 | Brisbane Roar | 12 | 4 | 2 | 6 | 18 | 19 | −1 | 14 | |
| 7 | Adelaide United | 12 | 3 | 1 | 8 | 9 | 29 | −20 | 10 | |
| 8 | Western Sydney Wanderers | 12 | 2 | 2 | 8 | 14 | 42 | −28 | 8 | |

Source: au.soccerway.com
Rules for classification: 1) points; 2) goal difference; 3) number of goals scored.
(C) Champions

==== Results summary ====
| Overall | | | | | | | | Home | | | | | | Away | | | | | |
| Pld | W | D | L | GF | GA | GD | Pts | W | D | L | GF | GA | GD | W | D | L | GF | GA | GD |
|---|---|---|---|---|---|---|---|---|---|---|---|---|---|---|---|---|---|---|---|
| 12 | 6 | 2 | 4 | 22 | 18 | +4 | 20 | 3 | 1 | 2 | 12 | 9 | +3 | 3 | 1 | 2 | 10 | 9 | +1 |

Last updated: 7 December 2014.
Source: Competitive Matches

==== Results by round ====
| Round | 1 | 2 | 3 | 4 | 5 | 6 | 7 | 8 | 9 | 10 | 11 | 12 |
|---|---|---|---|---|---|---|---|---|---|---|---|---|
| Ground | A | A | H | H | A | H | A | H | H | A | A | H |
| Result | W | W | L | W | L | L | W | D | W | D | L | W |
| Position | 1 | 1 | 4 | 3 | 4 | 5 | 4 | 3 | 2 | 4 | 3 | 3 |

Updated to match(es) played on 7 December 2014. Source: Competitive Matches
A = Away; H = Home; W = Win; D = Draw; L = Loss

==== Goal scorers ====
| Total | Player | | Goals per Round | | | | | | | | | | | |
| Total | Player | | 1 | 2 | 3 | 4 | 5 | 6 | 7 | 8 | 9 | 10 | 11 | 12 |
|---|---|---|---|---|---|---|---|---|---|---|---|---|---|---|
| 6 | (Australia) | Michelle Heyman | 2 | | | | | 1 | | | 1 | 1 | | 1 |
| 4 | (Australia) | Ashleigh Sykes | | | | | | | 1 | | | 1 | 1 | 1 |
| 3 | (Australia) | Caitlin Munoz | 1 | | 1 | | | 1 | | | | | | |
| 2 | (Australia) | Ellie Brush | 1 | | | | | | | 1 | | | | |
| 2 | (United States) | Stephanie Ochs | | 1 | | | | | | | 1 | | | |
| 2 | Goal | Own goal | | | | 1 | | | | | | 1 | | |
| 1 | (United States) | Lori Lindsey | | | 1 | | | | | | | | | |
| 1 | (Australia) | Grace Field | | | | 1 | | | | | | | | |
| 1 | (Australia) | Sally Rojahn | | | | | | | | | 1 | | | |
| 22 | TOTAL | | 4 | 1 | 2 | 2 | 0 | 2 | 1 | 1 | 3 | 3 | 1 | 2 |

=== W-League Finals series ===
| 13 December 2014 Semi-final | Melbourne Victory | 0 – 0 (a.e.t.) (4 – 5 p) | Canberra United | Geelong |
| 15:00 AEDT | | Report | | Stadium: Simonds Stadium; Referee: Kate Jacewicz |
| | Penalties |
| | Barnes (penalty scored); Catley (penalty scored); Reed (penalty scored); Nairn (penalty scored); Koca (penalty missed) | | (penalty scored) G. Gill; (penalty scored) Lindsey; (penalty scored) Ochs; (penalty scored) Munoz; (penalty scored) Fletcher |

| 21 December 2014 Grand final | Perth Glory | 1 – 3 | Canberra United | Perth |
| 12:00 AWST | McCallum 63' | Report | Ochs 20'; Sykes 75', 78' | Stadium: nib Stadium; Attendance: 2,671; Referee: Kate Jacewicz |

== Awards ==
- Player of the Week (Round 1) - Michelle Heyman
- Player of the Week (Round 9) - Stephanie Ochs
- Player of the Week (Round 12) - Ashleigh Sykes
- Grand Final Man of the Match - Ashleigh Sykes
