= 2014 W-League grand final (December) =

- Event: 2014 W-League
Perth Glory	Canberra United
1	3
- Date: 21 December 2014
- Venue: nib Stadium, Perth, Australia
- Referee: Kate Jacewicz
- Attendance: 2,671
- Weather: Sunny, 27 °C (81 °F); 34% humidity

The 2014 W-League grand final took place at nib Stadium in Perth, Western Australia on 21 December 2014.

== Match details ==
21 December 2014
12:00 AWST

Perth Glory	1–3	Canberra United
McCallum 63'	Report	Ochs 20'; Sykes 75', 78'

nib Stadium, Perth
Attendance: 2,671
Referee: Kate Jacewicz

Perth Glory	Canberra United

PERTH GLORY:
GK	1	(Australia) Mackenzie Arnold
MF	2	(Australia) Sarah Carroll	(yellow card) 49'	(substituted off) 62'
MF	6	(Australia) Alanna Kennedy
DF	15	(Canada) Shelina Zadorsky	(yellow card) 90+3'
DF	4	(Australia) Bronwyn Studman
MF	5	(United States) Shannon May
MF	14	(Australia) Collette McCallum (c)
FW	17	(Australia) Marianna Tabain
MF	9	(Australia) Caitlin Foord	(yellow card) 64'
FW	12	(Australia) Kate Gill
MF	13	(Australia) Elisa D'Ovidio		(substituted off) 73'
Substitutes:
DF	3	(Australia) Carys Hawkins		(substituted in) 62'
FW	7	(Australia) Gabrielle Marzano		(substituted in) 73'
GK	18	(Australia) Gabrielle Dal Busco
DF	8	(Australia) Shawn Billam
DF	16	(Australia) Thia Eastman
Manager:
(Australia) Jamie Harnwell

CANBERRA UNITED:
GK	1	(United States) Chantel Jones
DF	12	(Australia) Sally Rojahn
DF	7	(Australia) Ellie Brush
DF	2	(Australia) Catherine Brown	(yellow card) 64'
DF	13	(Australia) Nicole Begg (c)
MF	10	(Australia) Grace Maher		(substituted off) 53'
MF	16	(United States) Lori Lindsey		(substituted off) 90+1'
MF	6	(Australia) Caitlin Munoz	(yellow card) 86'
FW	22	(United States) Stephanie Ochs
FW	11	(Australia) Michelle Heyman
FW	14	(Australia) Ashleigh Sykes
Substitutes:
DF	3	(Australia) Julia De Angelis		(substituted in) 53'
MF	9	(Australia) Grace Gill		(substituted in) 90+1'
GK	20	(Australia) Melissa Maizels
DF	5	(Australia) Grace Field
MF	15	(Australia) Tegan Riding
Manager:
(Netherlands) Liesbeth Migchelsen
