= A-League Women Golden Boot =

Annual award for the top scorer in Australia's top women's football (soccer) league

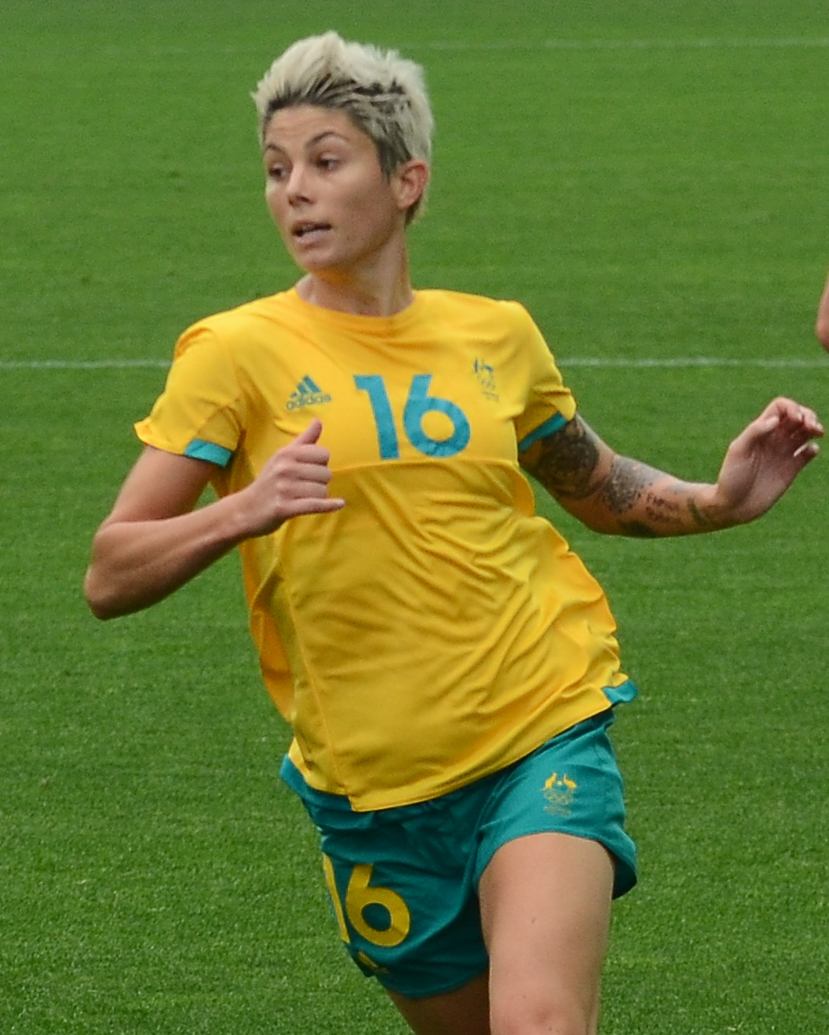
- 2024 winner Michelle Heyman
- Awarded for: The leading goalscorer in a given A-League Women season.
- Country: Australia
- Presented by: Football Australia
- Formerly called: W-League Golden Boot
- First award: 2008
- Currently held by: Holly McNamara

Highlights
- Most wins: Michelle Heyman (3)

The A-League Women Golden Boot (previously W-League Golden Boot) is an annual football (soccer) award presented to the leading goalscorer in the Australian W-League and then A-League Women.

The W-League was established in 2008 as the top tier of women's football in Australia. It was re-branded as the A-League Women from September 2021. The award is given to the top-scorer over the regular season (not including the finals series). The inaugural award was won by Leena Khamis of Sydney FC, who also scored the fewest to win with seven (equalised in 2019–20 by four players [see below]).

Michelle Heyman has won the award three times, and also scored the highest tally in a season of 17 goals in 2023–24. While Kate Gill, Sam Kerr and Holly McNamara have each won the award twice. England's Jodie Taylor was the first non-Australian to have won the award.

== Winners ==
Key
Player ^{X}	Name of the player and ^{X} the number of times they had won the award at that point (if more than one)
Games	The number of W-League/A-League Women regular season games played by the winner that season (Note: This does not necessarily match the total number of games in a season.)
Rate	The winner's goals-to-games ratio that regular season

Golden Boot winners
Season	Player	Nationality	Club	Goals	Games	Rate	Reference
2008–09	Leena Khamis	Australia	Sydney FC	7	10	0.7	
2009	Michelle Heyman	Australia	Central Coast Mariners	11	10	1.1	
2010–11	Kyah Simon	Australia	Sydney FC	11	10	1.1	
2011–12	Michelle Heyman ^{(2)}	Australia	Canberra United	12	10	1.2	
2012–13	Kate Gill	Australia	Perth Glory	11	11	1.0	
2013–14	Jodie Taylor	England	Sydney FC	10	11	0.9	
2014	Kate Gill ^{(2)}	Australia	Perth Glory	12	12	1.0	
2015–16	Larissa Crummer	Australia	Melbourne City	11	10	1.1	
2016–17	Ashleigh Sykes	Australia	Canberra United	12	12	1.0	
2017–18	Sam Kerr	Australia	Perth Glory	13	9	1.4	
2018–19	Sam Kerr ^{(2)}	Australia	Perth Glory	13	11	1.2	
2019–20	Morgan Andrews	United States	Perth Glory	7	11	0.64	
2019–20	Natasha Dowie	England	Melbourne Victory	7	12	0.58	
2019–20	Kristen Hamilton	United States	Western Sydney Wanderers	7	12	0.58	
2019–20	Remy Siemsen	Australia	Sydney FC	7	12	0.58	
2020–21	Emily Gielnik	Australia	Brisbane Roar	13	12	1.1	
2021–22	Fiona Worts	England	Adelaide United	13	14	1.0	
2022–23	Hannah Keane	United States	Western United	13	18	0.7	
2023–24	Michelle Heyman ^{(3)}	Australia	Canberra United	17	22	0.8	
2024–25	Holly McNamara	Australia	Melbourne City	15	18	0.8	
2025–26	Holly McNamara ^{(2)}	Australia	Melbourne City	12	18	0.7	

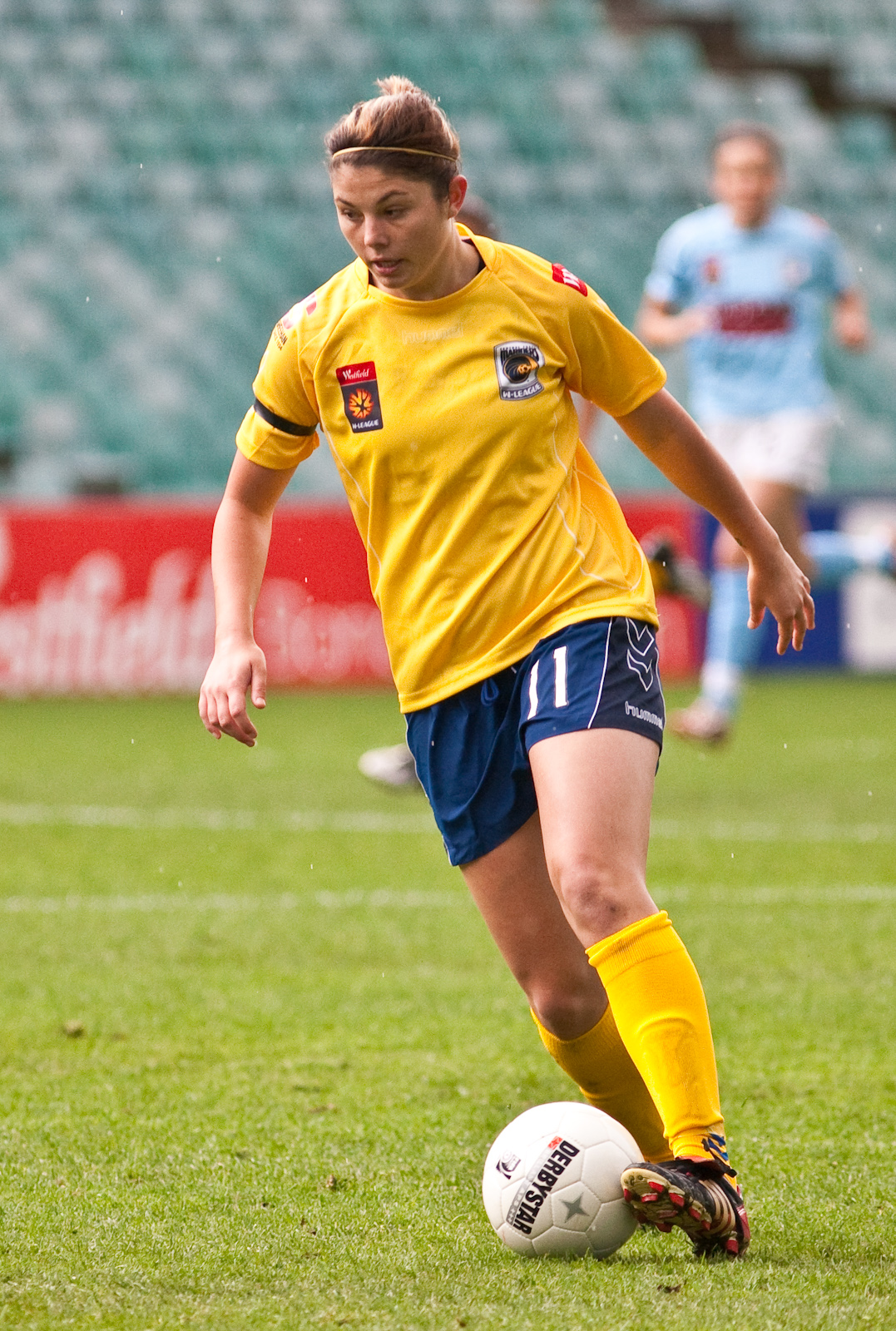
Michelle Heyman, top scorer for the 2009 A-League season

== Awards won by club ==
Club	Total
Perth Glory	5
Sydney FC	4
Canberra United	3
Melbourne City	3
Adelaide United	1
Brisbane Roar	1
Central Coast Mariners	1
Melbourne Victory	1
Western Sydney Wanderers	1
Western United	1

== See also ==
- List of sports awards honoring women
- A-League Women records and statistics
- Julie Dolan Medal
