= Hannah Bromley =

New Zealand footballer

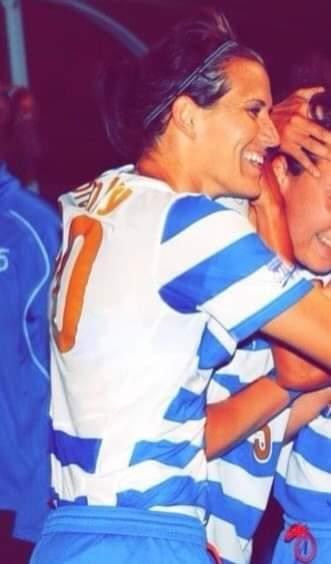

Personal information
- Full name: Hannah Avis Bromley
- Date of birth: 15 November 1986 (age 39)
- Place of birth: New Plymouth, New Zealand
- Height: 1.76 m (5 ft 9 in)
- Position: Defender

College career
Years	Team	Apps	(Gls)
2005–2006	Tennessee Tech Golden Eagles		
2007–2008	Central Connecticut Blue Devils		

Senior career*
Years	Team	Apps	(Gls)
2008	Western Mass Lady Pioneers		
2008–2009	New England Mutiny	30	
2010	IF Fløya	13	(1)
2011	Herforder SV	28	(1)
2012	Glenfield Rovers	15	(4)
2012–2013	Sydney FC	4	(0)
2013–2015	North Shore Mariners	82	(11)
2015–2016	Newcastle Jets	11	(0)
2016	Suwon	4	(0)

International career
- New Zealand U-20
2004–2012	New Zealand	12	(0)
- * Club domestic league appearances and goals as of 9 February 2016

Hannah Bromley (born 15 November 1986) in New Plymouth, New Zealand, is a former footballer who played as a defensive midfielder and central defender. She has represented New Zealand on the senior national team as well as various youth national teams.

== Club career ==
SoccerPlus Connecticut FC

Bromley played a summer season for the semi professional club SoccerPlus Connecticut in the USA's Women's Premier Soccer League.

=== Western Mass Lady Pioneers ===
She played a few matches for W-League club Western Mass Lady Pioneers in 2008.

=== IF Floya ===
Bromley, signed an 18-month contract with IF Fløya in Norway's Toppserien League with an option for a further year, on Monday, 1 February 2010.

=== Herforder SV ===
Bromley signed a 2-year contract with Herforder SV in Germany's Women's Bundesliga on 15 January 2011.

=== Sydney FC ===
In 2012, Bromley signed a one-year contract with Sydney FC in the W-League in Australia.

=== Newcastle Jets ===
In October 2015, Bromley joined Newcastle Jets FC in the W-League in Australia and made 12 appearances.

=== Suwon ===
After a season with Newcastle Jets, Bromley joined Suwon in South Korea on a 2-year contract with teammate Gemma Simon.

== International career ==
Bromley regularly attended New Zealand football academies as a youth and represented New Zealand at under-17 level before making her full senior international debut at 18 as a substitute against Japan on 21 May 2005.

She appeared in 2 group games for New Zealand at the 2006 Women's U-20 World Cup.

Bromley was included in the New Zealand Squad for the 2007 Women's World Cup in China where they lost to Brazil 5–0, Denmark 2–0 and China 2–0.

== College career ==
Central Connecticut State University

Bromley transferred to Division 1 college CCSU after a year at Division 1 college Tennessee Tech University. Bromley played 57 matches for the CCSU Blue Devils and was named to the NCAA Division 1 team in 2009 as a senior and selected for the New England Women's Intercollegiate Soccer Association Senior Bowl. Bromley ended her college career with an NEC Championship win and an NCCA nationals loss vs Boston College.

== Early career ==
Bromley attended Merrilands Youth Club FC and attended New Plymouth Girls High School in New Zealand. Bromley played for her region of Taranaki on both the youth and women's levels.

NEC

Bromley ended her career with a Northeast Championship win and loss to Boston College in the NCAA tournament.

== Personal life ==
Aside from soccer, Bromley gained a master's degree in psychology with highest honours (summa cum laude) in 2022 and started HB Athlete Mindset - Sport Psychology for athletes. Bromley has said to enjoy surfing, hiking and fishing in her spare time.
