= 2014 W-League (Australia) =

Seventh season of the top women's football (soccer) league in Australia

W-League
- Season: 2014
- Champions: Canberra United (2nd title)
- Premiers: Perth Glory (1st title)
- Matches: 48
- Goals: 170 (3.54 per match)
- Top goalscorer: Kate Gill (12)
- Biggest home win: Perth Glory 5–0 Western Sydney Wanderers (15 November 2014)
- Biggest away win: Western Sydney Wanderers 1–10 Perth Glory (5 October 2014)
- Highest scoring: Western Sydney Wanderers 1–10 Perth Glory
- Longest winning run: 6 games Perth Glory
- Longest unbeaten run: 6 games Perth Glory
- Longest winless run: 5 games Adelaide United; Brisbane Roar
- Longest losing run: 5 games Adelaide United
- All statistics correct as of 7 December 2014.

The 2014 W-League season was the seventh season of the W-League, the Australian national women's association football competition. The regular season started on 13 September 2014 and concluded on 7 December 2014. The Grand Final took place on 21 December 2014.

Due to Australia hosting the 2015 AFC Asian Cup, the season was scheduled to take place entirely in the 2014 calendar year instead of continuing in to 2015.

== Clubs ==
=== Stadia and locations ===
Team	Location	Stadium	Capacity
Adelaide United	Adelaide	Adelaide Shores Football Centre	1,000
Brisbane Roar	Brisbane	Perry Park; Suncorp Stadium	5,000; 52,500
Canberra United	Canberra	McKellar Park	3,500
Melbourne Victory	Melbourne	Lakeside Stadium	12,000
Newcastle Jets	Newcastle	Wanderers Oval	3,500
Perth Glory	Perth	Ashfield Reserve	2,000
Sydney FC	Sydney	Lambert Park; Leichhardt Oval	7,000; 22,000
Western Sydney Wanderers	Sydney	Marconi Stadium	11,500

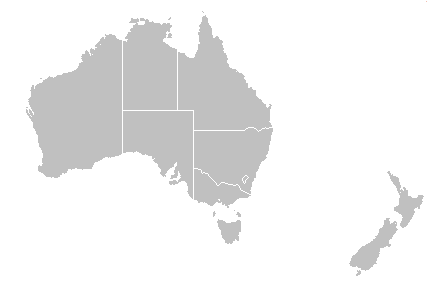

=== Personnel and kits ===
Team	Manager	Captain	Kit manufacturer	Kit sponsor
Adelaide United	(Australia) Ross Aloisi	(England) Kristy Moore	Puma	SA Power Networks
Brisbane Roar	(Australia) Belinda Wilson	(Australia) Clare Polkinghorne	Umbro	Brisbane Airport
Canberra United	(Netherlands) Liesbeth Migchelsen	(Australia) Nicole Begg	Hummel	University of Canberra
Melbourne Victory	(Australia) Joe Montemurro	(Australia) Stephanie Catley	Adidas	Jetts Fitness
Newcastle Jets	(Australia) Peter McGuinness	(Australia) Emily van Egmond	ISC	Football Five5
Perth Glory	(Australia) Jamie Harnwell	(Australia) Collette McCallum	Macron	Smarter Than Smoking
Sydney FC	(Australia) Alen Stajcic	(Australia) Teresa Polias	Adidas	Beechwood Homes
Western Sydney Wanderers	(Australia) Stephen Roche	(Australia) Caitlin Cooper	Nike	University of Western Sydney

=== Foreign players ===
Club	Visa 1	Visa 2	Visa 3	Non-Visa foreigner(s)	Former player(s)
Adelaide United	(Denmark) Katrine Pedersen	(England) Katie Holtham	(Norway) Lisa-Marie Woods	(England) Kristy Moore^{A}	
Brisbane Roar	(Germany) Nadine Angerer				
Canberra United	(United States) Chantel Jones	(United States) Lori Lindsey	(United States) Stephanie Ochs	(United States) Kendall Fletcher^{G}	
Melbourne Victory	(United States) Lauren Barnes	(United States) Christine Nairn	(United States) Elli Reed	(Turkey) Gülcan Koca^{A}	
Newcastle Jets	(United States) Tori Huster	(United States) Katherine Reynolds	(United States) Angela Salem		
Perth Glory	(Canada) Shelina Zadorsky	(Wales) Carys Hawkins			
Sydney FC	(United States) Samantha Johnson	(United States) Jasmyne Spencer			
Western Sydney Wanderers	(England) Hannah Beard	(United States) Kendall Johnson	(United States) Keelin Winters		

The following do not fill a Visa position:
^{A} Australian citizens who have chosen to represent another national team;
^{G} Guest Players

== Regular season ==
=== League table ===
Pos	Team	Pld	W	D	L	GF	GA	GD	Pts	Qualification
1	Perth Glory	12	10	0	2	39	10	+29	30	Qualification to Finals series
2	Melbourne Victory	12	6	2	4	26	15	+11	20	Qualification to Finals series
3	Canberra United (C)	12	6	2	4	22	18	+4	20	Qualification to Finals series
4	Sydney FC	12	5	3	4	17	16	+1	18	Qualification to Finals series
5	Newcastle Jets	12	5	2	5	25	21	+4	17	
6	Brisbane Roar	12	4	2	6	18	19	−1	14	
7	Adelaide United	12	3	1	8	9	29	−20	10	
8	Western Sydney Wanderers	12	2	2	8	14	42	−28	8	

Source: au.soccerway.com
Rules for classification: 1) points; 2) goal difference; 3) number of goals scored.
(C) Champions

=== Fixtures ===
Individual matches are collated at each club's season article.

== Finals series ==
Semi-finals
1	Perth Glory	3
4	Sydney FC	0
3	Melbourne Victory	0 (4)
2	Canberra United (p)	0 (5)

Grand Final
1	Perth Glory	1
2	Canberra United	3

=== Semi-finals ===
13 December 2014	Melbourne Victory	0–0 (a.e.t.) (4–5 p)	Canberra United	Simonds Stadium, Geelong
Saturday 15:00 AEDT		Report		Referee: Kate Jacewicz
	Penalties
	Barnes (penalty scored); Catley (penalty scored); Reed (penalty scored); Nairn (penalty scored); Koca (penalty missed)		(penalty scored) Gill; (penalty scored) Lindsey; (penalty scored) Ochs; (penalty scored) Munoz; (penalty scored) Fletcher

14 December 2014	Perth Glory	3–0	Sydney FC	nib Stadium, Perth
Sunday 12:00 AWST	D'Ovidio 10'; Gill 37'; Marzano 70'	Report		Attendance: 1,389; Referee: Casey Reibelt

=== Grand final ===
21 December 2014	Perth Glory	1–3	Canberra United	nib Stadium, Perth
Sunday 12:00 AWST	McCallum 63'	Report	Ochs 20'; Sykes 75', 78'	Attendance: 2,671; Referee: Kate Jacewicz

== Season statistics ==
=== Top goalscorers ===
Total	Player		Club	Goals per Game											
Total	Player		Club	1	2	3	4	5	6	7	8	9	10	11	12
12	(Australia)	Kate Gill	Perth Glory	2		1	5	2					1	1	
11	(Australia)	Sam Kerr	Perth Glory			1	2					2	2	3	1
8	(United States)	Jasmyne Spencer	Sydney FC	2		1	1	1		1	1		1		
8	(Australia)	Racheal Quigley	Melbourne Victory		2						1	1	1	3	
7	(Australia)	Tameka Butt	Brisbane Roar					1		1	1	2		1	1
6	(Australia)	Rhali Dobson	Newcastle Jets			1	2				1		1		1
6	(Australia)	Michelle Heyman	Canberra United	2					1			1	1		1
6	(Australia)	Tara Andrews	Newcastle Jets		1				2			1	1		1
5	(Australia)	Amy Jackson	Melbourne Victory		1			3	1						
5	(Australia)	Emily van Egmond	Newcastle Jets				1		1	2		1			
5	(United States)	Keelin Winters	Western Sydney Wanderers		2					1				2	
5	(Australia)	Caitlin Foord	Perth Glory				2				1	1		1	

Goal scored from penalty kick Two goals scored from penalty kick

=== Own goals ===
Player		Team	Against	Round
(Australia)	Elise Kellond-Knight	Brisbane Roar	Canberra United	4
(Australia)	Larissa Crummer	Brisbane Roar	Western Sydney Wanderers	5
(Australia)	Laura Alleway	Brisbane Roar	Newcastle Jets	7
(Australia)	Teigen Allen	Sydney FC	Western Sydney Wanderers	7
(United States)	Katherine Reynolds	Newcastle Jets	Canberra United	10

=== Player of the Week ===
- Round 1 – Michelle Heyman (Canberra United)
- Round 2 – Keelin Winters (Western Sydney Wanderers)
- Round 3 – Lisa De Vanna (Melbourne Victory)
- Round 4 – Rhali Dobson (Newcastle Jets)
- Round 5 – Amy Jackson (Melbourne Victory)
- Round 6 – Katrina Gorry (Brisbane Roar)
- Round 7 – Hannah Beard (Western Sydney Wanderers)
- Round 8 – Caitlin Foord (Perth Glory)
- Round 9 – Stephanie Ochs (Canberra United)
- Round 10 – Christine Nairn (Melbourne Victory)
- Round 11 – Racheal Quigley (Melbourne Victory)
- Round 12 – Ashleigh Sykes (Canberra United)
- Semi-finals – Kate Gill (Perth Glory)
- Grand Final – Ashleigh Sykes (Canberra United)

== End-of-season awards ==
- Julie Dolan Medal – Emily van Egmond (Newcastle Jets)
- Players’ Player of the Year – Sam Kerr (Perth Glory)
- Young Player of the Year – Amy Harrison (Sydney FC)
- Golden Boot Award – Kate Gill (12 goals) (Perth Glory)
- Goalkeeper of the Year – Mackenzie Arnold (Perth Glory)
- Coach of the Year – Peter McGuinness (Newcastle Jets)
- Fair Play Award – Adelaide United
- Referee of the Year – Kate Jacewicz
- Goal of the Year – Ashleigh Sykes (Canberra United v Perth Glory, 7 December 2014)

== International competition ==
The W-League was represented in the third edition of the International Women's Club Championship, known for sponsorship reasons as the Nestlé Cup.

Melbourne Victory (the winners of the 2013–14 season) participated in the tournament, which took place from 30 November until 8 December 2013, and finished in sixth place (out of 6 teams).

== See also ==
- 2014 Adelaide United W-League season
- 2014 Brisbane Roar W-League season
- 2014 Canberra United W-League season
- 2014 Melbourne Victory W-League season
- 2014 Newcastle Jets W-League season
- 2014 Perth Glory W-League season
- 2014 Sydney FC W-League season
- 2014 Western Sydney Wanderers W-League season
