= Verónica Pérez =

Mexican footballer (born 1988)

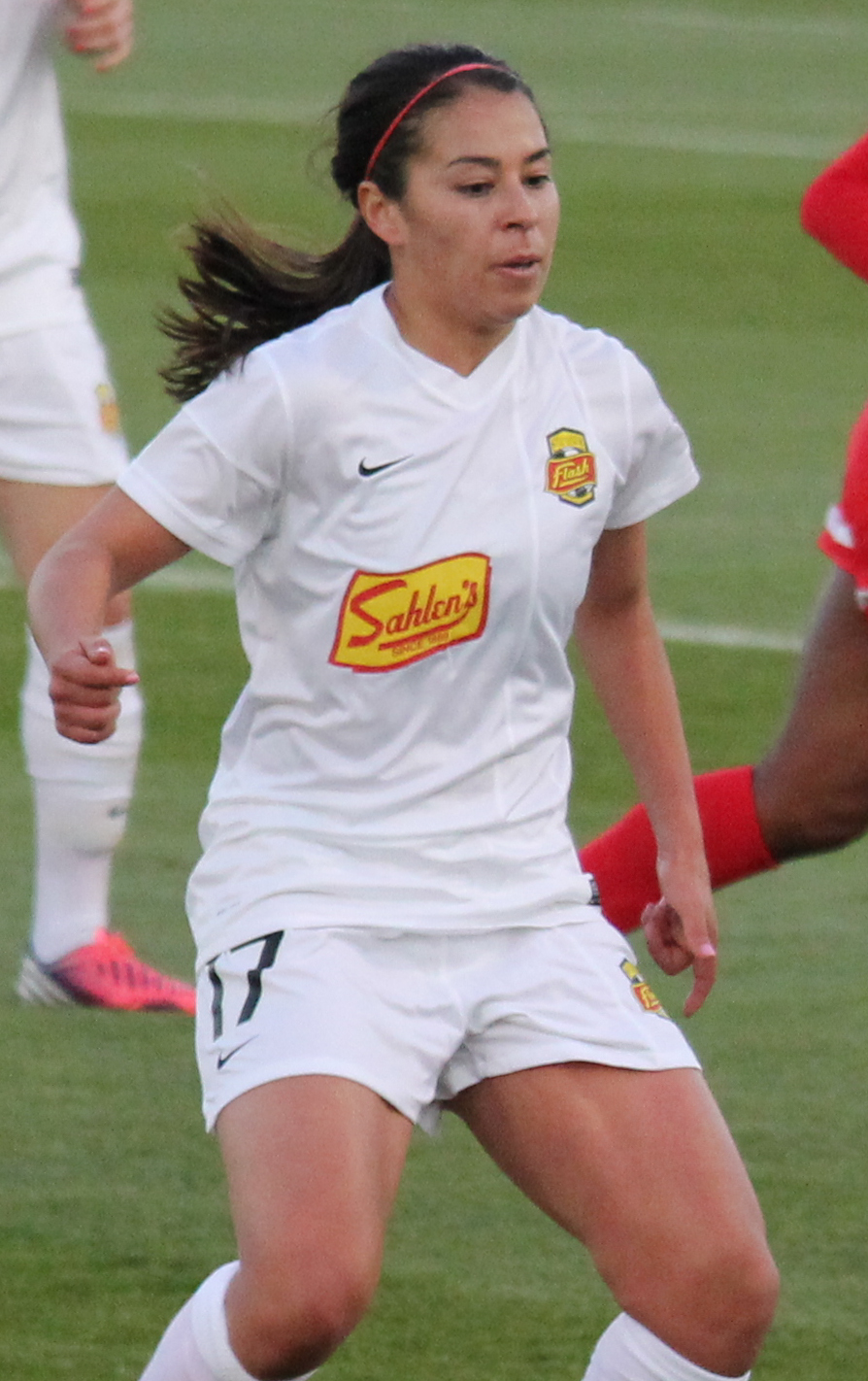
- Pérez in 2013

Personal information
- Full name: Verónica Raquel Pérez Murillo
- Date of birth: 18 May 1988 (age 38)
- Place of birth: Hayward, California, United States
- Height: 1.58 m (5 ft 2 in)
- Position: Attacking midfielder

Youth career
- 2002–2005: PSV Union & Pleasanton Rage
- 2002–2003: Crystal Springs Uplands High School

College career
| Years | Team | Apps | (Gls) |
| 2006–2009 | Washington Huskies | 83 | (21) |

Senior career*
| Years | Team | Apps | (Gls) |
| 2009 | Seattle Sounders Women | 8 | (1) |
| 2010 | Saint Louis Athletica | 1 | (0) |
| 2012 | Seattle Sounders Women | 14 | (12) |
| 2012 | Stjarnan | 7 | (1) |
| 2013 | Western New York Flash | 22 | (1) |
| 2014 | Washington Spirit | 16 | (0) |
| 2015–2016 | Canberra United | 11 | (3) |
| 2016 | KIF Örebro DFF | 20 | (2) |
| 2018 | OSA FC | 1 | (1) |
| 2019 | PacNW Women | 6 | (3) |
| 2019–2020 | Tijuana | 5 | (0) |
| 2020–2021 | América | 17 | (1) |
| 2021–2022 | Atlas | 37 | (5) |
| 2022–2023 | Tijuana | 33 | (3) |
| 2023–2024 | Al Qadsiah FC | 14 | (3) |

International career^{‡}
| 2009 | United States U23 | | |
| 2010–2016 | Mexico | 84 | (9) |
- * Club domestic league appearances and goals as of 22 July 2019 ‡ National team caps and goals as of 18 June 2015

Verónica Raquel Pérez Murillo (born 18 May 1988) is a footballer who plays as an attacking midfielder. Born in the United States, she represented the Mexico women's national team. Between 2009 and 2016 she also played in professional leagues in the United States, Europe, and Australia.

Perez retired from international football in 2017 after the newly created Liga MX Femenil restricted eligibility to compete to only Mexico-born players. Two years later, when the Mexican Football Federation allowed foreign-born Mexican players, she joined Club Tijuana.

== Early life ==
Her parents are Bernardo Pérez and Irene Murillo. She holds dual citizenship in the United States and Mexico. Perez attended Crystal Springs Uplands School where she played one year of soccer, earning first team, All-League honors. During her Freshman, Sophomore and Junior years she played for PSV Union FC and in her junior and senior years, she played for the club team, Pleasonton Rage, and represented the Far West region Olympic Development (ODP) team at the 2005 U.S. Youth Soccer Adidas Cup.

=== University of Washington ===
Pérez played for the University of Washington Huskies and was twice named to the All-Pac-10 second team. Pérez left the University of Washington ranked in the all-time top-10 in several categories, including third in shots (194) and games played (83), fourth in game-winning goals (8), tied for sixth in goals (21) and eighth in points (53).

== Club career ==
Perez was selected as the 37th pick overall in the Women's Professional Soccer (WPS) draft by the Saint Louis Athletica in 2010. After the WPS folded, Perez began training again with the Mexico women's national football team.

Perez played for the Seattle Sounders Women during the 2009 and 2012 seasons and was a leading scorer.

During the summer of 2012, Pérez and her Sounders teammate and fellow University of Washington alum, Kate Deines, played for Stjarnan in Iceland's top division. The team won the Icelandic Women's Cup after a 1–0 win over Valur.

On 11 January 2013, Perez joined the Western New York Flash as part of the NWSL Player Allocation for the inaugural season of the National Women's Soccer League.

3 March 2014, Western New York Flash traded Perez and a 2015 fourth-round draft pick to the Washington Spirit in exchange for a 2014 and 2015 international roster spot. After she did not receive allocation status for the 2016 seasons, her NWSL rights were acquired by Seattle Reign FC in March 2016.

Pérez joined Swedish top division club KIF Örebro DFF in January 2016.

In 2018, Perez played for OSA FC in the Women's Premier Soccer League. She moved to PacNW Women the next year. After playing for short tenures at Tijuana, América and Atlas, she joined Saudi club Al Qadsiah FC in October 2023.

== International career ==
Perez played for both the Mexico women's national football team and the United States women's national under-23 soccer team during the Summer of 2009. On 5 November 2010, she scored the winning goal for Mexico in the CONCACAF Women's World Cup Qualifying game against the United States. In mid-2011, Pérez represented Mexico in the 2011 FIFA Women's World Cup in Germany. In October of that year, she led Mexico to a third-place finish in the 2011 Pan American Games. Perez retired from international duty after the Liga MX Femenil restricted play to only Mexico-born players.

== Career statistics ==
=== International goals ===
| No. | Date | Venue | Opponent | Score | Result | Competition |
|---|---|---|---|---|---|---|
| 1. | 5 November 2010 | Cancún, Mexico | United States | 2–1 | 2–1 | 2010 CONCACAF Women's World Cup Qualifying |
| 2. | 22 April 2011 | Chía, Colombia | Colombia | 1–0 | 3–2 | Friendly |
| 3. | 22 October 2011 | Guadalajara, Mexico | Colombia | 1–0 | 1–0 | 2011 Pan American Games |
| 4. | 27 January 2012 | Vancouver, Canada | Canada | 1–2 | 1–3 | 2012 CONCACAF Women's Olympic Qualifying Tournament |
| 5. | 25 November 2014 | Veracruz, Mexico | Costa Rica | 1–0 | 1–0 | 2014 Central American and Caribbean Games |
| 6. | 11 March 2015 | Larnaca, Cyprus | Italy | 3–2 | 3–2 | 2015 Cyprus Women's Cup |
| 7. | 9 June 2015 | Moncton, Canada | Colombia | 1–0 | 1–1 | 2015 FIFA Women's World Cup |
| 8. | 23 January 2016 | Foshan, China | South Korea | 1–0 | 2–0 | 2016 Four Nations Tournament |

== Coaching career ==
Perez is an assistant coach for her former club, PSV Union FC.

== Honors ==
Western New York Flash

- NWSL Shield: 2013

== See also ==
- List of 2011 Pan American Games medalists
- List of University of Washington people
