= Meg McLaughlin =

Australian soccer player (born 1995)

Personal information
- Full name: Meg Louise McLaughlin
- Date of birth: 20 March 1995 (age 31)
- Place of birth: Paddington, Australia
- Height: 1.75 m (5 ft 9 in)
- Position: Striker

Team information
- Current team: Canberra United
- Number: 8

Senior career*
| Years | Team | Apps | (Gls) |
| 2012–2013 | Sydney FC | 1 | (0) |
| 2013–2016 | Canberra United | 22 | (0) |
- * Club domestic league appearances and goals as of 12:36, 13 March 2021 (UTC)

Meg Louise McLaughlin (born 20 March 1995) is an Australian football (soccer) player, who most recently played for Canberra United in the Australian W-League.

With Monaro Panthers in the Canberra Premier League, she broke the goalscoring record with 30 goals in 18 appearances in a single season. Her career was affected by knee injuries; she missed the entire 2014–15 season due to knee problems.
