= Rebecca Kiting =

Australian soccer player

Personal information
- Date of birth: 8 May 1991 (age 35)
- Place of birth: Canberra, Australia
- Height: 1.75 m (5 ft 9 in)
- Position: Defender

Team information
- Current team: Canberra United
- Number: 18

Youth career
- 2010–2013: Quinnipiac Bobcats

Senior career*
| Years | Team | Apps | (Gls) |
| 2008–2010 | Canberra United | 19 | (1) |
| 2014– | Canberra United | 16 | (1) |
- * Club domestic league appearances and goals as of 6 March 2016

Rebecca Kiting (born 8 May 1991) is an Australian football (soccer) player, who currently plays for Canberra United in the Australian W-League. At the age of 17, she was one of the original players on the team during its inaugural season in 2008.
