= Holly Houston =

Australian soccer player (born 1989)

Personal information
- Full name: Holly Houston
- Date of birth: 25 September 1989 (age 37)
- Place of birth: Moree, Australia
- Position: Midfielder

Senior career*
| Years | Team | Apps | (Gls) |
| 2013–2015 | Canberra United | 3 | (0) |
- * Club domestic league appearances and goals as of 14 September 2014

Holly Houston (born 25 September 1989) is an Australian football (soccer) player, who last played for Canberra United in the Australian W-League.

== Personal life ==
Outside of football, Houston has worked as an apprentice signwriter.
