= Melissa Maizels =

Australian soccer player (born 1993)

Personal information
- Full name: Melissa Ashleigh Maizels
- Date of birth: 10 May 1993 (age 33)
- Place of birth: Melbourne, Australia
- Position: Goalkeeper

Senior career*
Years	Team	Apps	(Gls)
2012–2014	Melbourne Victory	0	(0)
2014–2016	Canberra United	4	(0)
2016–2018	Perth Glory	18	(0)
2018–2019	Canberra United	0	(0)
2019–2022	Melbourne Victory	1	(0)
2022–2023	Melbourne Victory	0	(0)
- * Club domestic league appearances and goals as of 6 January 2023

Melissa Maizels (born 10 May 1993) is an Australian soccer goalkeeper who last played for Australian A-League Women team Melbourne Victory. She previously played for Perth Glory and Canberra United.

== Early life ==
Maizels was born in Melbourne, Australia, and is Jewish. Her great, great, great-grandfather was the Chief Rabbi of Łódź.

She began playing soccer at the age of nine. She represented Victoria four times for futsal and soccer, and competed in national tournaments at the Australian Institute of Sport (from which she earned her coaching UEFA B Licence) as well as in Canberra and Perth. In 2009, she helped the futsal team make the grand final.

== Playing career ==
She played at Melbourne Victory from 2012 to 2014.

=== Canberra United, 2014–2016 ===
In July 2014, Maizels signed with Canberra United. She made her debut for the club during a match against Adelaide United after the team's starting goalkeeper Chantel Jones was injured.

=== Perth Glory, 2016–2018 ===
Maizels joined Perth Glory for the 2016–17 W-League season. She suffered a serious hand injury, which ended her season after only six games. Maizels returned for the 2017–18 W-League season as Perth's number one keeper and played every minute of the season.

=== Canberra United, 2018–2019 ===
Maizels signed with Canberra United for the 2018–19 W-League, returning to the club she had played for from 2014 to 2016.

=== Melbourne Victory, 2019–2022 ===
Maizels joined Melbourne Victory ahead of the 2019–20 W-League season. Ahead of the 2022–23 A-League Women season, she was released by the club. At the end of 2022, while working as an assistant coach with Melbourne Victory, Maizels was re-signed temporarily as an injury replacement due to an injury to back-up keeper Miranda Templeman. She was included on the bench for the match against Canberra United but was not used, and the following week Templeman returned ending Maizel's contract.

== International career ==
She competed for Team Australia at the 2017 Maccabiah Games in Israel.

== Honors and awards ==
with Canberra United

- W-League winner: 2014–15

with Melbourne Victory

- W-League runner-up: 2012–13, 2013–14

with Perth Glory

- W-League runner-up: 2016–17

== See also ==
- List of select Jewish football (association; soccer) players
