= Julia De Angelis =

Australian soccer player

Personal information
- Date of birth: 8 September 1997 (age 29)
- Place of birth: Canberra, Australia
- Height: 5 ft 3 in (1.60 m)
- Position: Midfielder

College career
Years	Team	Apps	(Gls)
2016	Indiana Hoosiers	15	(0)

Senior career*
Years	Team	Apps	(Gls)
2014–2016	Canberra United	21	(0)
- * Club domestic league appearances and goals as of 1 October 2017

Julia De Angelis (born 8 September 1997) is an Australian soccer player playing for Indiana Hoosiers. She has previously played for Canberra United in the Australian W-League.

== College career ==
De Angelis joined the Indiana Hoosiers in February 2016.
