= Michelle Heyman =

Australian soccer player (born 1988)

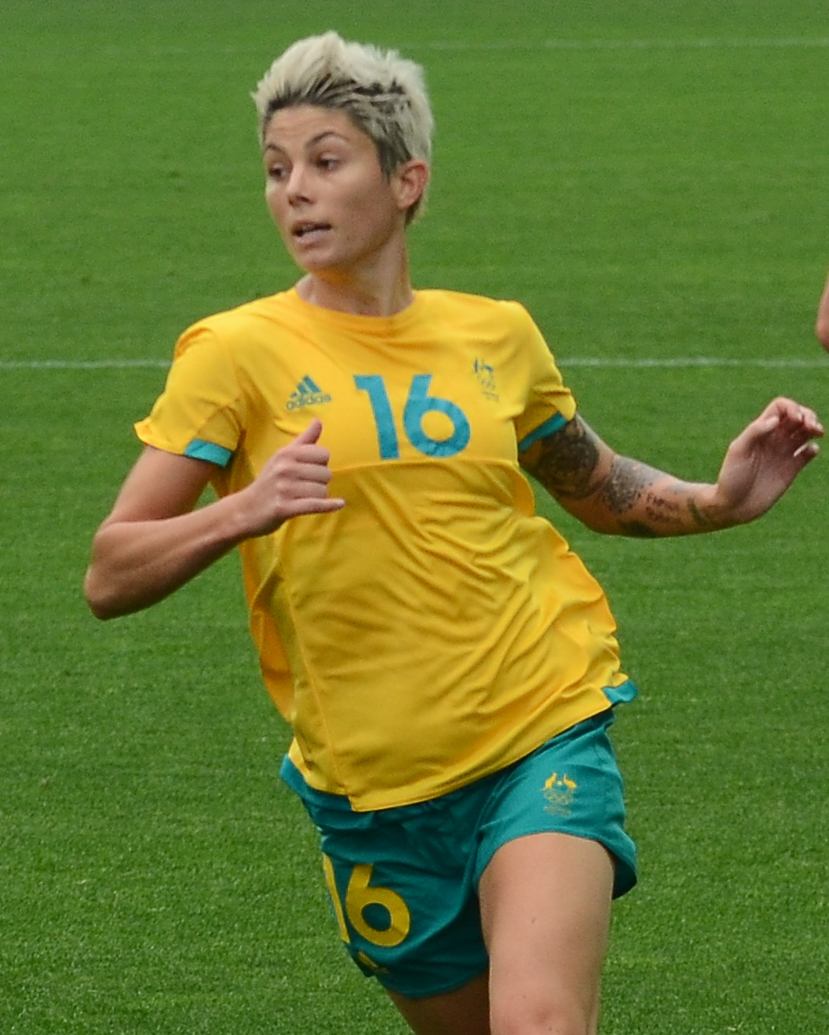
- Heyman playing for Australia at the 2016 Rio Olympics

Personal information
- Full name: Michelle Pearl Heyman
- Date of birth: 4 July 1988 (age 38)
- Place of birth: Shellharbour, New South Wales, Australia
- Height: 1.80 m (5 ft 11 in)
- Position: Striker

Team information
- Current team: Canberra United
- Number: 23

Youth career
- Illawarra Stingrays

Senior career*
Years	Team	Apps	(Gls)
2008	Illawarra Stingrays		
2008–2009	Sydney FC	3	(0)
2009	Central Coast Mariners	11	(11)
2010–2018	Canberra United	91	(51)
2012	Brøndby IF		
2015	Western New York Flash	9	(1)
2016–2018	Illawarra Stingrays	11	(5)
2018–2019	Adelaide United	12	(1)
2020–	Canberra United	87	(56)

International career^{‡}
2010–	Australia	86	(33)
- * Club domestic league appearances and goals as of 17 May 2025 ‡ National team caps and goals as of 6 March 2026

Michelle Pearl Heyman (born 4 July 1988) is an Australian soccer player and commentator who as of 2024 plays for Canberra United FC in the A-League in Australia. She became the all-time record goalscorer in the W-League in March 2021 after scoring her 73rd goal. Heyman first represented Australia in the Matildas in 2010, playing at the 2014 AFC Women's Asian Cup, the 2015 FIFA World Cup and the 2016 Summer Olympics. In May 2019, she retired from international football, but returned to the team in January 2024 when she was called up following an injury to Matildas' striker Sam Kerr.

She has previously played for W-League teams Central Coast Mariners, Sydney FC, and Adelaide United, as well as the Western New York Flash in the American National Women's Soccer League.

== Club career ==
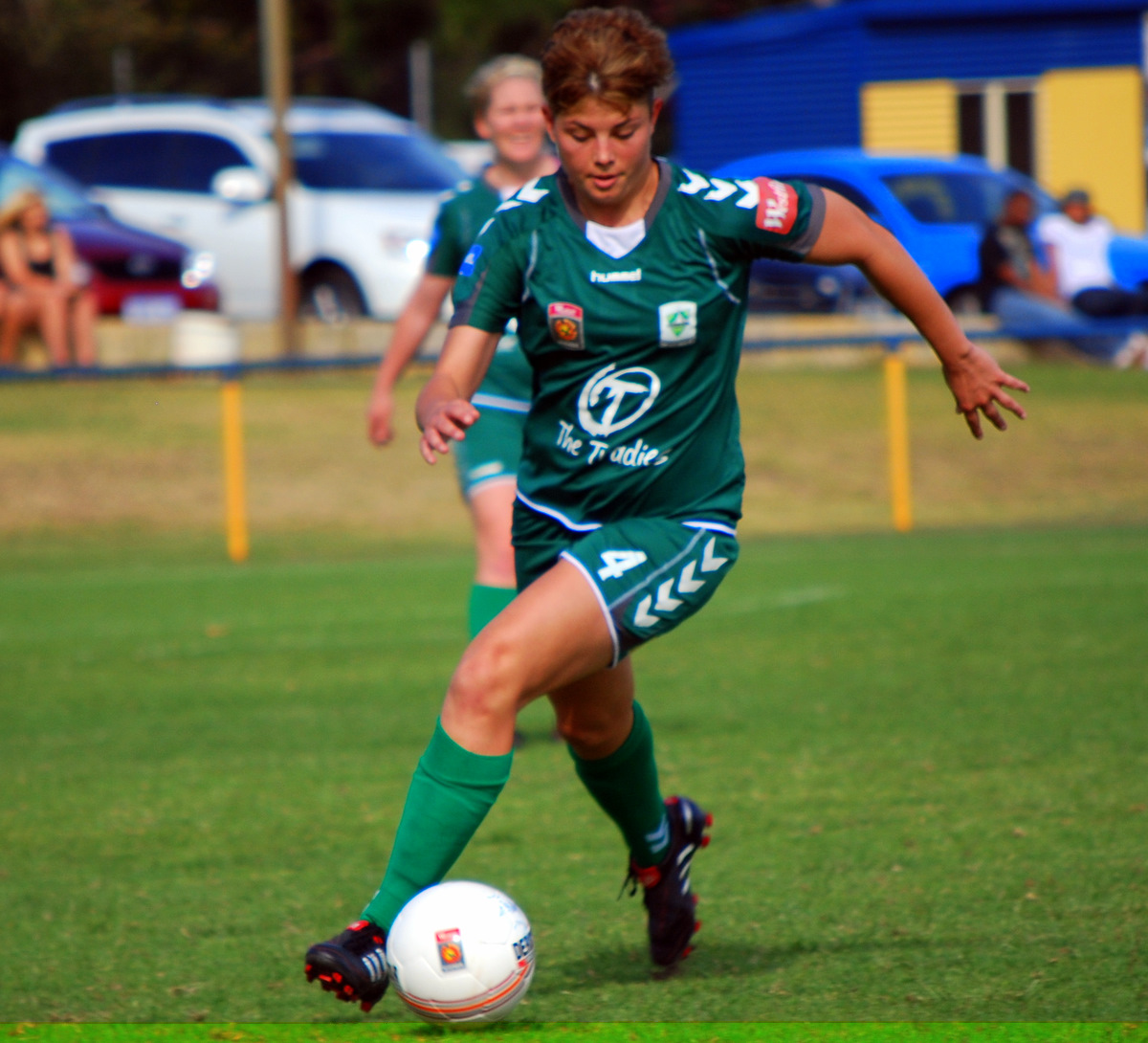
Heyman playing for Canberra United in 2010

Heyman began playing at the age of 11 with the Warilla Wanderers. She later played for Port Kembla FC and Shellharbour City before signing with Illawarra Stingrays in the New South Wales Women's Super League (now NPL NSW Women's). She has returned to play for the Stingrays several times between W-League seasons.

Prior to the beginning of the 2008–09 W-League season, Heyman trialled for Sydney FC. Out of 120 triallists, she was one of only ten to be signed by the club.

Heyman signed from Sydney FC in the off-season to join Central Coast Mariners. On her debut for the Mariners, Heyman scored a double against her old club, Sydney FC.

In 2009, Heyman won the Golden Boot award for most goals scored during the League season along with the Julie Dolan Medal as the 2009 W-League player of the year.

In 2010, Heyman signed with Canberra United. During the 2011–12 W-League season, she was the leading goal-scorer in the league as Canberra United won the W-League premiership/championship double.

Heyman spent five months in 2012 playing in Denmark for Brøndby IF. She returned to Canberra United in time for the start of the 2012–13 W-League season.

On 9 July 2015, Heyman signed with US side Western New York Flash where she played nine matches in the 2015 National Women's Soccer League season.

In 2016, rejoined the Illawarra Stingrays in the NPL NSW Women's competition during the W-League off-season.

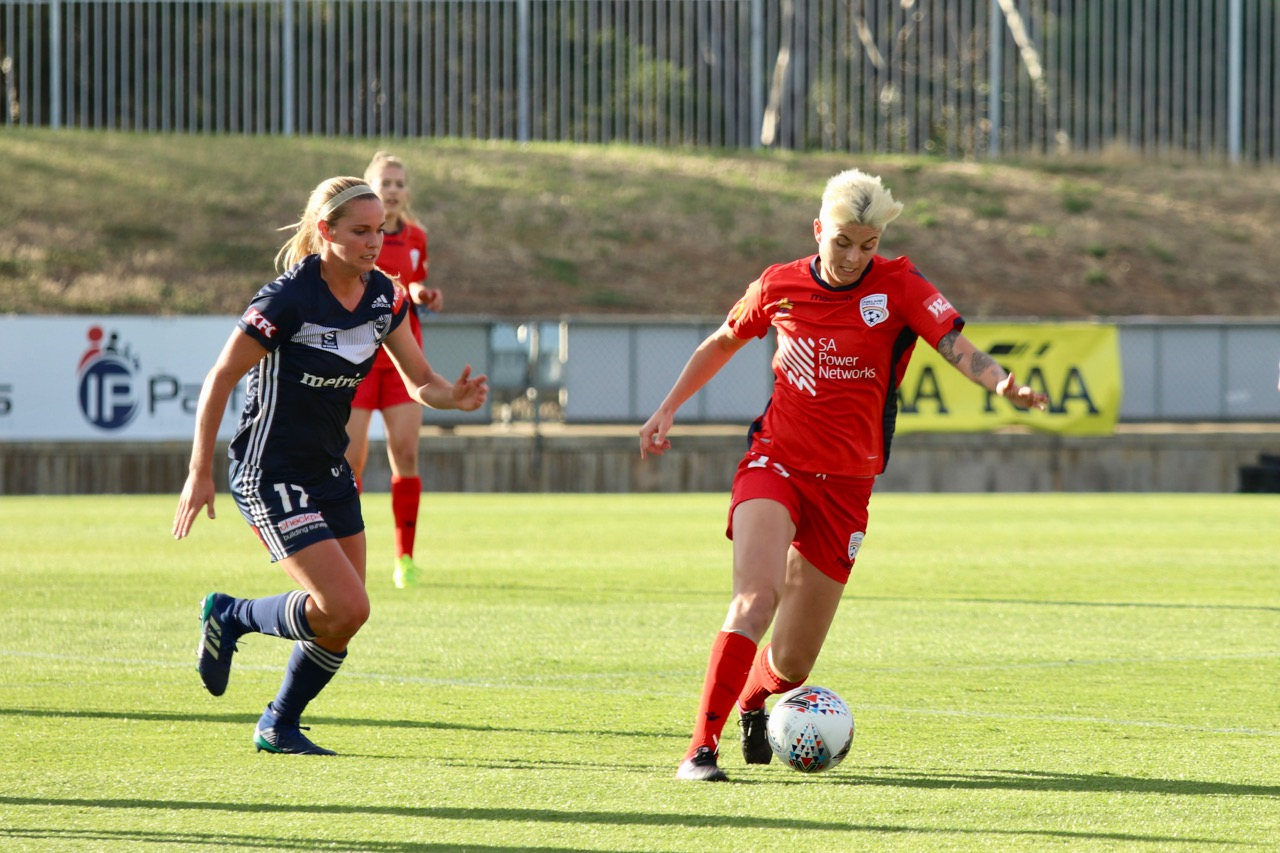
Heyman (at right) playing for Adelaide United in 2018–19.

On 21 July 2018, it was announced that Heyman was leaving Canberra United after eight seasons. She made 93 appearances for Canberra, and scored 56 goals. She won the Golden Boot twice, and won two Championship Titles and three Premierships.

On 24 August 2018, Adelaide United announced they had signed Heyman to a one-year contract for the 2018–19 W-League Season. At the end of the season, Heyman left Adelaide. After a season not playing soccer but rather coaching at a Sydney secondary school, Heyman returned to the W-League, signing with Canberra United.

On 13 January 2024, Heyman became the first W-League player to score 100 league goals following a 50th minute goal against Adelaide United. As from October 2026 she holds the record for most appearances in the A-League Women/W-League at 221 and the most goals scored at 125.

== International career ==
Heyman made her debut for the national team, the Matildas, in 2010. She was part of the 2014 AFC Women's Asian Cup squad that finished the tournament as runners-up. Heyman played five matches for Australia at the 2015 FIFA World Cup. At the 2016 Summer Olympics, Heyman played four matches for the Australian team that was eliminated in the quarter finals.

Heyman was named to the Matildas squad for the 2018 AFC Women's Asian Cup, but she did not appear in any matches. Australia finished runner-up to Japan and qualified for the 2019 FIFA World Cup. In May 2019 Heyman announced her retirement from international football. She later revealed that she had been fired from the team, after suffering from a number of physical injuries as well as mental health issues.

In 2024, following an injury to Matildas' striker Sam Kerr, Heyman was called up to the squad for the third round of the 2024 AFC Women's Olympic Qualifying Tournament, for two matches against Uzbekistan. She scored in her first match back, opening scoring in the 71st minute for a 3-0 victory. In the second match, she scored 4 goals in the first half of the 10-0 victory. Australia qualified for the Olympics.

On 4 June 2024, Heyman was named in the Matildas team that qualified for the Paris 2024 Olympics, her second Olympic games selection. She scored the game-winning goal in the Matildas' second group stage match, a come-from-behind 6–5 victory over Zambia.

== Personal life ==
Heyman is openly lesbian. She was the only openly lesbian Australian athlete at the 2016 Olympics.

In 2024, Heyman got engaged to her partner Christine Aldridge.

Heyman has spoken openly about suffering from anxiety and panic attacks, as well as her physical injuries.

== Career statistics ==
=== International ===
Scores and results list Australia's score first.

#	Date	Venue	Opponent	Score	Result	Competition
1	3 September 2011	Jinan Olympic Sports Center Stadium, Jinan, China	Thailand	2–0	5–1	2012 Olympics qualification
2	3 September 2011	Jinan Olympic Sports Center Stadium, Jinan, China	Thailand	3–0	5–1	2012 Olympics qualification
3	13 September 2012	Carroll Stadium, Indianapolis, United States	Haiti	4–0	4–0	Friendly
4	13 June 2013	Australian Institute of Sport, Canberra, Australia	New Zealand	1–0	1–0	Friendly
5	5 March 2014	GSZ Stadium, Larnaca, Cyprus	Netherlands	2–2	2–2	2014 Cyprus Cup
6	10 March 2014	GSZ Stadium, Larnaca, Cyprus	Scotland	1–3	2–4	2014 Cyprus Cup
7	10 March 2014	GSZ Stadium, Larnaca, Cyprus	Scotland	2–4	2–4	2014 Cyprus Cup
8	9 April 2014	Queensland Sport and Athletics Centre, Brisbane, Australia	Brazil	2–1	2–1	Friendly
9	10 February 2015	Bill McKinlay Park, Auckland, New Zealand	North Korea	2–1	2–1	Friendly
10	12 February 2015	Bill McKinlay Park, Auckland, New Zealand	New Zealand	2–0	3–2	Friendly
11	11 March 2015	Paralimni Stadium, Paralimni, Cyprus	Czech Republic	4–1	6–2	2015 Cyprus Cup
12	19 May 2015	Valentine Sports Park, Sydney, Australia	Vietnam	4–0	4–0	Friendly
13	21 May 2015	Jubilee Oval, Sydney, Australia	Vietnam	2–0	11–0	Friendly
14	21 May 2015	Jubilee Oval, Sydney, Australia	Vietnam	6–0	11–0	Friendly
15	21 May 2015	Jubilee Oval, Sydney, Australia	Vietnam	8–0	11–0	Friendly
16	29 February 2016	Kincho Stadium, Osaka, Japan	Japan	2–0	3–1	2016 Olympics qualifying
17	2 March 2016	Nagai Stadium, Osaka, Japan	Vietnam	8–0	9–0	2016 Olympics qualifying
18	7 March 2016	Nagai Stadium, Osaka, Japan	North Korea	1–0	2–1	2016 Olympics qualifying
19	9 August 2016	Itaipava Arena Fonte Nova, Salvador, Brazil	Zimbabwe	5–0	6–1	2016 Summer Olympics
20	9 August 2016	Itaipava Arena Fonte Nova, Salvador, Brazil	Zimbabwe	6–0	6–1	2016 Summer Olympics
21	24 February 2024	Bunyodkor Stadium, Tashkent, Uzbekistan	Uzbekistan	1–0	3–0	2024 Olympics qualifying
22	28 February 2024	Marvel Stadium, Melbourne, Australia	Uzbekistan	2–0	10–0	2024 Olympics qualifying
23	28 February 2024	Marvel Stadium, Melbourne, Australia	Uzbekistan	3–0	10–0	2024 Olympics qualifying
24	28 February 2024	Marvel Stadium, Melbourne, Australia	Uzbekistan	4–0	10–0	2024 Olympics qualifying
25	28 February 2024	Marvel Stadium, Melbourne, Australia	Uzbekistan	8–0	10–0	2024 Olympics qualifying
26	31 May 2024	Adelaide Oval, Adelaide, Australia	China	1–1	1–1	Friendly
27	28 July 2024	Stade de Nice, Nice, France	Zambia	6–5	6–5	2024 Summer Olympics
28	7 December 2024	Kardinia Park, Geelong, Australia	Chinese Taipei	4–0	6–0	Friendly
29	23 February 2025	State Farm Stadium, Glendale, United States	United States	1–2	2–1	2025 SheBelieves Cup
30	2 June 2025	GIO Stadium, Canberra, Australia	Argentina	4–1	4–1	Friendly
31	29 June 2025	HBF Park, Perth, Australia	Slovenia	1–0	1–1	Friendly
32	8 July 2025	HBF Park, Perth, Australia	Panama	1–1	3–2	Friendly
33	8 July 2025	HBF Park, Perth, Australia	Panama	2–1	3–2	Friendly

== Honours ==
Australia

- AFC Olympic Qualifying Tournament: 2016

Canberra United

- W-League Premiership: 2011–12, 2013–14
- W-League Championship: 2011–12, 2014

Individual

- Julie Dolan Medal: 2009, 2021
- W-League Golden Boot/A-League Women Golden Boot: 2009, 2011–12, 2023–24
