= Catherine Brown (footballer) =

Australian soccer player (born 1994)

Personal information
- Born: 10 January 1994 (age 32); Canberra, Australia
- Debut: Round 1, S7 (2022), Hawthorn vs. Essendon, at Marvel Stadium
- Height: 176 cm (5 ft 9 in)
- Position: Defender

Playing career^{1}
Years	Club	Games (Goals)
2022 (S7)–2023	Hawthorn	16 (1)
- ^{1} Playing statistics correct to the end of 2023.

Catherine Brown (born 10 January 1994) is a retired Australian rules footballer who played with the Hawthorn Football Club in the AFL Women's (AFLW) competition. Brown is also a former soccer player, who last played for Canberra United in the Australian W-League.

== Soccer career ==
Catherine Brown
Personal information
- Full name: Catherine Devon Dalfina Brown
- Date of birth: 10 January 1994 (age 32)
- Place of birth: Canberra, Australia
- Position: Right back

Senior career*
Years	Team	Apps	(Gls)
2012–2016	Canberra United	32	(0)
- * Club domestic league appearances and goals as of 6 March 2016

Brown played 32 times for Canberra United in the W-League between 2012 and 2015. Her career at W-League ended after she sustained a long-term knee injury while training to play Australian rules football. She attempted to return with a four-week trial for Canberra United before the 2017–18 W-League season but was not offered a contract.

== Australian rules football career ==
Ahead of the 2017 AFL Women's season, Brown trialled for the GWS Giants before a knee injury ended her hopes of playing.

In 2019, Brown played for the Eastlake Demons in the AFL Canberra First Grade Women's competition.

== Statistics ==
Legend
G	Goals	K	Kicks	D	Disposals	T	Tackles
B	Behinds	H	Handballs	M	Marks

Season	Team	No.	Games	Totals							Averages (per game)							Votes
Season	Team	No.	Games	G	B	K	H	D	M	T	G	B	K	H	D	M	T	Votes
2022 (S7)	Hawthorn	42	10	0	0	81	20	101	9	15	0.0	0.0	8.1	2.0	10.1	0.9	1.5	0
2023	Hawthorn	42	6	1	0	32	15	47	9	12	0.2	0.0	5.3	2.5	7.8	1.5	2.0	0
Career			16	1	0	113	35	148	18	27	0.1	0.0	7.1	2.2	9.2	1.1	1.7	0

== Honours and achievements ==
Individual

- Hawthorn best club person: 2023
