= Stephanie Ochs =

American soccer forward (born 1990)

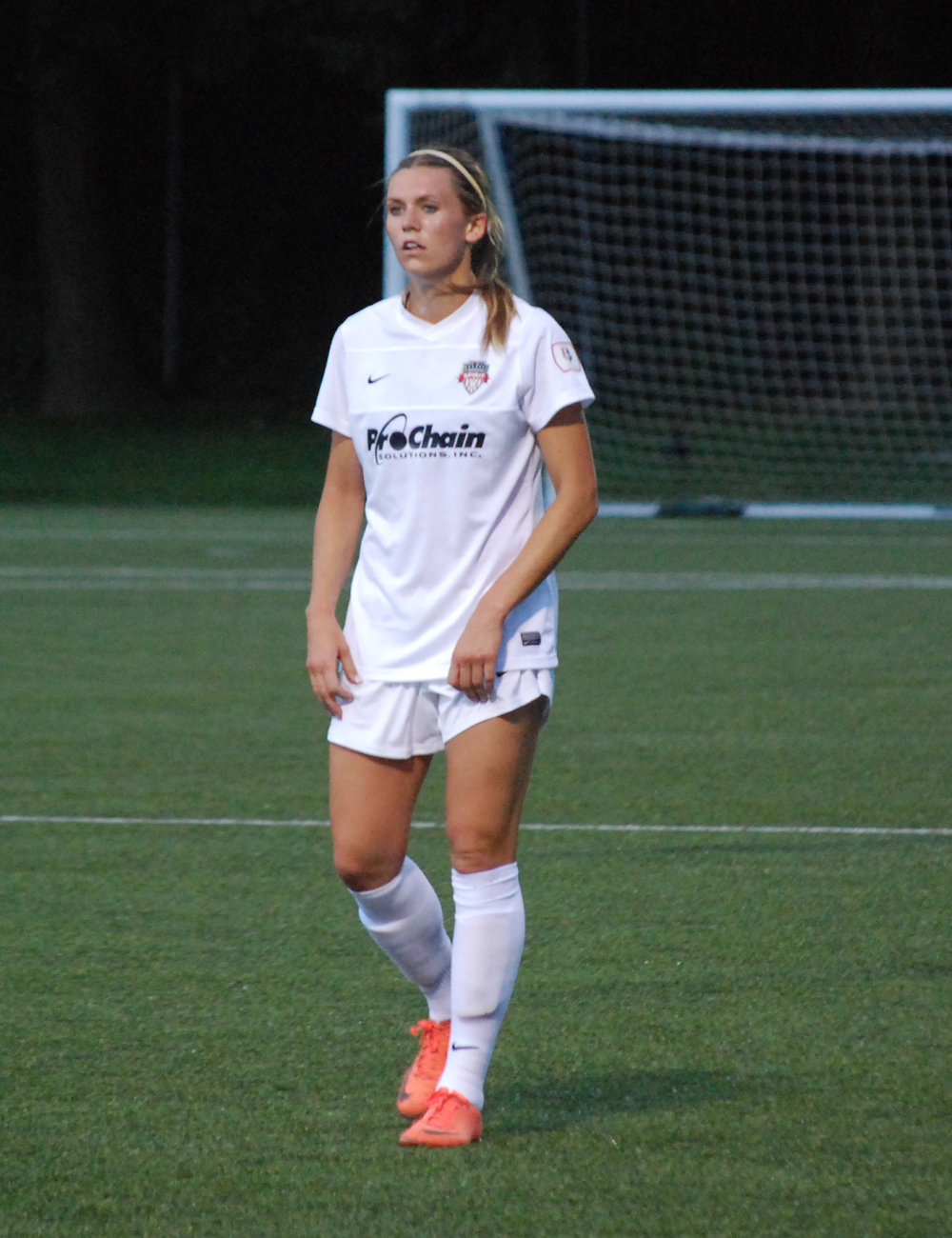
- Ochs playing for Washington Spirit, 2013

Personal information
- Full name: Stephanie Elise Ochs
- Date of birth: August 29, 1990 (age 36)
- Place of birth: San Diego, California, United States
- Height: 5 ft 9 in (1.75 m)
- Positions: Defender; forward

College career
Years	Team	Apps	(Gls)
2008–2012	San Diego Toreros		

Senior career*
Years	Team	Apps	(Gls)
2013	Washington Spirit	22	(1)
2013–2015	Canberra United	26	(9)
2014–2017	Houston Dash	38	(0)
2016–2017	Canberra United	13	(3)
2017	North Carolina Courage	6	(0)

International career
2011–2013	United States U-23		
- * Club domestic league appearances and goals as of October 14, 2017

Stephanie Elise Ochs (born August 29, 1990) is an American soccer forward.

== Early life ==
Born in San Diego, California to Carol and David Ochs, Stephanie attended Patrick Henry High School where she played on the varsity soccer team all four years. As a senior, she was named first-team All-CIF, while leading her team to the CIF Semi-finals and an Eastern League championship. She was also named her school's Female Athlete of the Year the same year. Ochs was named first-team All-Eastern League three times and helped lead her team to four consecutive league championships. She was named second-team All-CIF as a junior and earned an All-CIF honorable mention as a freshman. She was named Outstanding forward as a sophomore, junior and senior.

Ochs played for the club team, Surf Soccer and helped lead the team to the Surf Cup Championship in 2006. She was also a member of the Olympic Development Program (ODP) and was a Regional Pool selection in 2005 and 2006 as well as a State Team member during the same years. In 2006, she was an ODP Region 4 champion and an OPD National champion. In 2007, she was an ODP Region 4 champion and an ODP national finalist.

=== University of San Diego, 2008–2012 ===
Ochs attended the University of San Diego where she played for the Toreros from 2008 to 2012. As a freshman, she played in all 22 matches with 13 starts, scored three goals and tallied two assists for eight points. She earned an All-WCC honorable mention and was named to the All-WCC Freshman team. Ochs helped the team receive a national ranking as high as number 11 and helped the team advance to the second round of the NCAA Tournament. She scored two game-winning goals against Iowa and San Francisco and tallied two assists in a win against Idaho State). During her sophomore year, Ochs played and started in all 21 matches of the season. She was named first-team All-WCC, second-team All-NSCAA and helped the team finish second in the prestigious West Coast Conference to earn a trip to the NCAA Tournament. She notched a total of six goals and eight assists for the team high of 20 points. As a junior in 2010, Ochs played and started in all 21 matches. She was named first-team All-WCC and led the team with a career-high eight goals. She added in seven assists for a team-best of 23 points and helped the Toreros earn an at-large bid into the NCAA Tournament. Both her junior and senior years she was named USD Torero Female Athlete of the Year. Her senior year she was named West Coast Conference Player of the Year.

== Club career ==
=== Boston Breakers ===
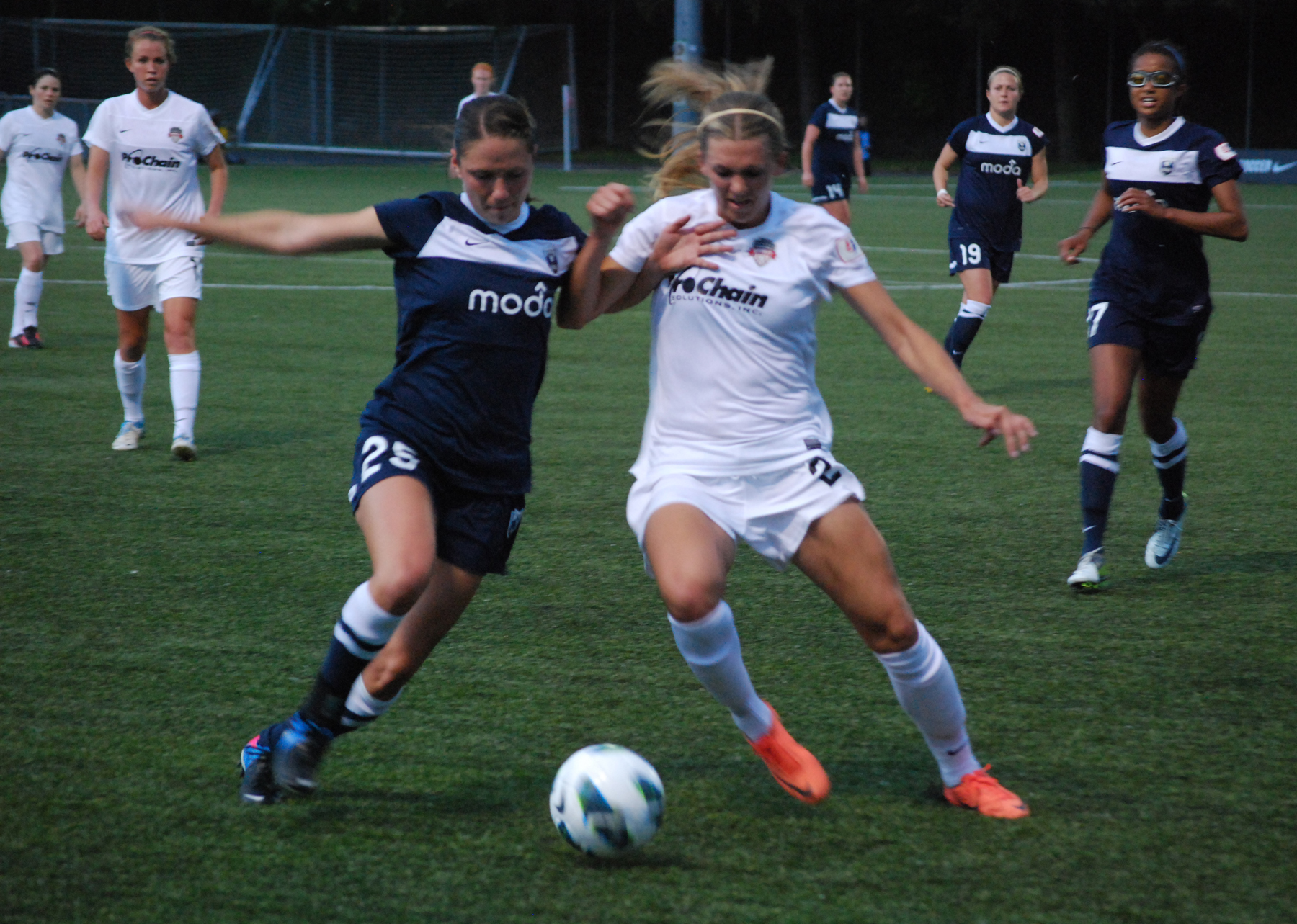
Ochs battles for the ball against Kiersten Dallstream of the Seattle Reign FC at Starfire Stadium on May 16, 2013

Ochs was selected first round, third pick of the 2012 WPS College Draft by the Boston Breakers in January 2012. However, two weeks later, the WPS league folded before play could commence for the 2012 season.

=== Western NY Flash ===
Ochs played for the WPSL Elite, 2012 season, for Western NY Flash, that went on to win its third Championship season.

=== Washington Spirit ===
Ochs was selected in the first round (first overall) of the 2013 NWSL Supplemental Draft by the Washington Spirit for the inaugural season of the National Women's Soccer League.

=== Canberra United ===
In September 2013, ahead of the upcoming season, Ochs signed for Canberra United in Australia. Ochs signed for a second season with Canberra United in 2014.

=== Houston Dash ===
In January 2014, the Washington Spirit traded Ochs to the newly formed NWSL expansion team, Houston Dash for Danesha Adams. This reunited Ochs with coach Randy Waldrum from U23 WNT.

Ochs re-signed with the Houston Dash for a second season in 2015. However, in the third game of the season vs. Boston Breakers at Soldier's Field in Boston on April 26, 2015, Ochs suffered a right knee injury in the 19th minute of the game, which later went on to be diagnosed as an ACL tear. She will be out of play for the remainder of the season as she rehabs.

Ochs came back from her ACL injury fully rehabbed and signed with Houston Dash for the 2016 season.

Ochs re-signed with Houston Dash for the 2017 season. On April 18, Ochs was waived by the Houston Dash.

=== North Carolina Courage ===
On June 16, 2017, the North Carolina Courage announced their signing of Ochs, two weeks after starting Courage defender Yuri Kawamura suffered a torn ACL and was placed on the season-ending injury list.

Following the 2017 season, the Courage placed Ochs on the Re-Entry Wire. She was not claimed by another team.

== International career ==
Ochs was a member of the United States under-23 women's national soccer team that won the Four Nations Tournament in La Manga, Spain in 2013. In 2013, she was named the tournament's Most Valuable Player, she played the tournament in the position of forward.

== Honors ==
North Carolina Courage

- NWSL Shield: 2017
