= Chantel Jones =

American soccer player

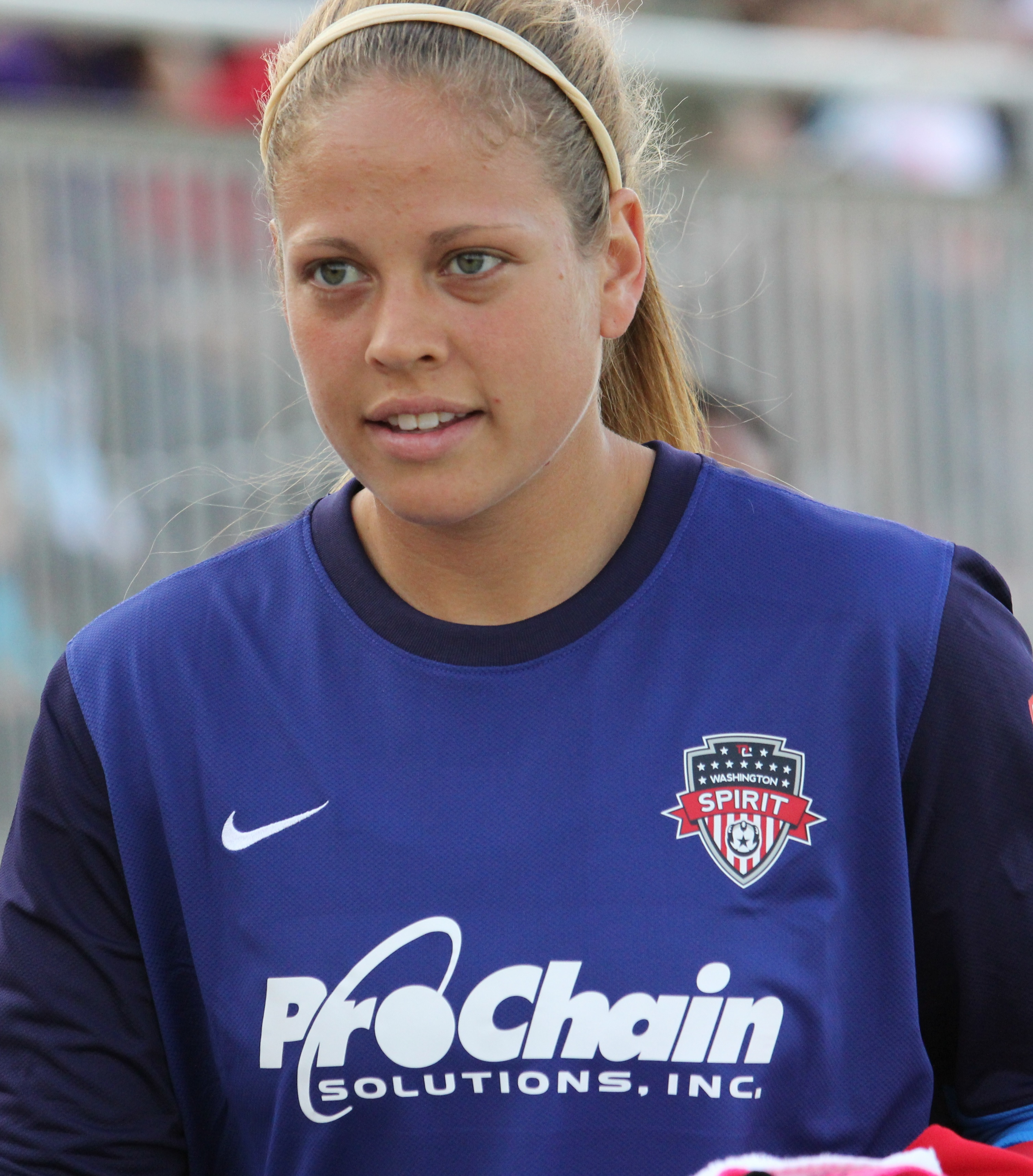
- Jones playing for Washington Spirit in 2013

Personal information
- Full name: Chantel Nicole Jones
- Date of birth: July 20, 1988 (age 38)
- Place of birth: Brookhaven, New York, U.S.
- Height: 5 ft 11 in (1.80 m)
- Position: Goalkeeper

Youth career
- 2003–2006: Clover Hill High School

College career
Years	Team	Apps	(Gls)
2006–2010	Virginia Cavaliers		

Senior career*
Years	Team	Apps	(Gls)
2009	Richmond Kickers Destiny		
2012	Þór Akureyri	18	(0)
2013	Washington Spirit	9	(0)
2013–2014	Perth Glory	12	(0)
2014	Canberra United	13	(0)
2015	Western New York Flash	13	(0)
2021	Canberra United	1	(0)

International career
- United States U16
2005	United States U17		
2007–2008	United States U20		
2009	United States U23		
Medal record
Women's soccer
Representing the United States
Pan American Games
Silver medal – second place	2007 Rio de Janeiro	Team
- * Club domestic league appearances and goals as of September 19, 2021

Chantel Nicole Jones (born July 20, 1988) is a retired American professional soccer player who works as a goalkeeping coach at Canberra United in the W-League. She previously played as a goalkeeper for the professional Icelandic team, Þór Akureyri, Washington Spirit and Western New York Flash of the NWSL as well as Perth Glory and Canberra United in the Australian W-League and the Virginia Cavaliers.

== College ==
She currently holds the NCAA record for most career shutouts, with 47 during her college career at the University of Virginia.

== Club career ==
In 2012, Jones played for Þór Akureyri in Akureyri, Iceland. She made 18 appearances for the club, starting all games for a total of 1620 minutes. She wrote about her experience in Iceland for Resolution Sports.

In February 2013, Jones was signed to the Washington Spirit for the inaugural season of the NWSL.

In July 2014, Jones signed for Canberra United in the Australian W-League. During the Grand Final match on December 21, 2014, Jones saved a penalty kick taken by Perth Glory FC in the 76th minute, preserving Canberra United's 2–1 lead. Canberra United FC scored again to win the championship 3–1. Jones signed for the Western New York Flash for the 2015 season.

Jones retired from soccer in January 2016.

In January 2021, while working as Canberra United's goalkeeping coach, Jones returned from retirement to sign a playing contract with the club until the end of the 2020–21 W-League season. At the end of the season, she returned to retirement.

== International career ==
Jones represented the United States at the 2008 FIFA U-20 Women's World Cup and also participated in the 2007 Pan American Games.
