= A-League Women awards =

Annual recognition awarded by the Australian W-League

The A-League Women, the top women's soccer league in Australia, hands out a number of annual awards.

== Current awards ==
=== Julie Dolan Medal ===
The medal is awarded annually to the player voted to be the best player in the A-League Women, the top women's football (soccer) league in Australia. The award is named after former Matildas Captain and football administrator Julie Dolan. The format was changed for the 2015–16 season, with a panel featuring former players, media, referees and technical staff, who voted on each regular-season match. The following table contains only the winners of the medal during the W-League era. The award was also presented for the best player in the previous Women's National Soccer League prior to the W-League.

Year	Winner	Club	Reference
2008–09	Lana Harch	Queensland Roar	
2009	Michelle Heyman	Central Coast Mariners	
2010–11	Kyah Simon	Sydney FC	
2011–12	Sally Shipard	Canberra United	
2012–13	Clare Polkinghorne	Brisbane Roar	
2013–14	Tameka Butt	Brisbane Roar	
2014	Emily van Egmond	Newcastle Jets	
2015–16	Ashleigh Sykes	Canberra United	
2016–17	Sam Kerr	Perth Glory	
2017–18	Sam Kerr; Clare Polkinghorne	Perth Glory; Brisbane Roar	
2018–19	Christine Nairn	Melbourne Victory	
2019–20	Kristen Hamilton	Western Sydney Wanderers	
2020–21	Michelle Heyman	Canberra United	
2021–22	Fiona Worts	Adelaide United	
2022–23	Alex Chidiac	Melbourne Victory	
2023–24	Sophie Harding	Western Sydney Wanderers	
2024–25	Alex Chidiac	Melbourne Victory	
2025–26	Isabel Gomez	Central Coast Mariners	

=== Young Footballer of the Year ===
Year	Winner	Club	Reference
2009	Elise Kellond-Knight; Ellyse Perry	Brisbane Roar; Canberra United	
2010–11	Kyah Simon	Sydney FC	
2011–12	Ashley Brown	Melbourne Victory	
2012–13	Steph Catley	Melbourne Victory	
2013–14	Steph Catley	Melbourne Victory	
2014	Amy Harrison	Sydney FC	
2015–16	Larissa Crummer	Melbourne City	
2016–17	Remy Siemsen	Sydney FC	
2017–18	Ellie Carpenter	Canberra United	
2018–19	Ellie Carpenter	Canberra United	
2019–20	Ellie Carpenter	Melbourne City	
2020–21	Kyra Cooney-Cross	Melbourne Victory	
2021–22	Holly McNamara	Melbourne City	
2022–23	Sarah Hunter	Sydney FC	
2023–24	Daniela Galic	Melbourne City	
2024–25	Indiana Dos Santos	Sydney FC	
2025–26	Pia Vlok	Wellington Phoenix	

=== Golden Boot ===
Year	Winner	Club	Goals	Reference
2008–09	Leena Khamis	Sydney FC	7	
2009	Michelle Heyman	Central Coast Mariners	11	
2010–11	Kyah Simon	Sydney FC	12	
2011–12	Michelle Heyman	Canberra United	15	
2012–13	Kate Gill	Perth Glory	11	
2013–14	Jodie Taylor	Sydney FC	10	
2014	Kate Gill	Perth Glory	12	
2015–16	Larissa Crummer	Melbourne City	11	
2016–17	Ashleigh Sykes	Canberra United	12	
2017–18	Sam Kerr	Perth Glory	13	
2018–19	Sam Kerr	Perth Glory	13	
2019–20	Morgan Andrews; Natasha Dowie; Kristen Hamilton; Remy Siemsen	Perth Glory; Melbourne Victory; Western Sydney Wanderers; Sydney FC	7	
2020–21	Emily Gielnik	Brisbane Roar	13	
2021–22	Fiona Worts	Adelaide United	13	
2022–23	Hannah Keane	Western United	13	
2023–24	Michelle Heyman	Canberra United	17	
2024–25	Holly McNamara	Melbourne City	15	
2025–26	Holly McNamara	Melbourne City	12	

=== Goalkeeper of the Year (Golden Glove) ===
Year	Winner	Club	Reference
2008–09	Melissa Barbieri	Melbourne Victory	
2009	Jillian Loyden	Central Coast Mariners	
2010–11	Lydia Williams	Canberra United	
2011–12	Lydia Williams	Canberra United	
2012–13	Mackenzie Arnold	Canberra United	
2013–14	Melissa Barbieri	Adelaide United	
2014	Mackenzie Arnold	Perth Glory	
2015–16	Kaitlyn Savage	Adelaide United	
2016–17	Lydia Williams	Melbourne City	
2017–18	Mackenzie Arnold	Brisbane Roar	
2018–19	Aubrey Bledsoe	Sydney FC	
2018–19	Lydia Williams	Melbourne City	
2019–20	Lydia Williams	Melbourne City	
2020–21	Teagan Micah	Melbourne City	
2021–22	Casey Dumont	Melbourne Victory	
2022–23	Hillary Beall	Western United	
2023–24	Morgan Aquino	Perth Glory	
2024–25	Sarah Langman	Central Coast Mariners	
2025–26	Courtney Newbon	Melbourne Victory	

=== Goal of the Year ===
Year	Winner	Club	Reference
2008–09	Marianna Tabain	Perth Glory	
2009	Sam Kerr	Perth Glory	
2010–11	Heather Garriock	Sydney FC	
2011–12	Racheal Quigley	Adelaide United	
2012–13	Emily van Egmond	Newcastle Jets	
2013–14	Sally Shipard	Canberra United	
2014	Ashleigh Sykes	Canberra United	
2015–16	Vanessa DiBernardo	Perth Glory	
2016–17	Sam Kerr	Perth Glory	
2017–18	Lisa De Vanna	Sydney FC	
2018–19	Cortnee Vine	Newcastle Jets	
2019–20	Amy Jackson	Melbourne Victory	
2020–21	Lisa De Vanna	Melbourne Victory	
2021–22	Rachel Lowe	Sydney FC	
2022–23	Madison Haley	Sydney FC	
2023–24	Cassidy Davis	Newcastle Jets	
2024–25	Alana Jancevski	Melbourne Victory	
2025–26	Peta Trimis	Central Coast Mariners	

=== Coach of the Year ===
Year	Winner	Club	Reference
2008–09	Jeff Hopkins	Queensland Roar	
2009	Ray Junna; Stephen Roche	Canberra United; Central Coast Mariners	
2010–11	Alen Stajcic	Sydney FC	
2011–12	Jitka Klimková	Canberra United	
2012–13	Mike Mulvey	Melbourne Victory	
2013–14	Alen Stajcic	Sydney FC	
2014	Peter McGuinness	Newcastle Jets	
2015–16	Craig Deans	Newcastle Jets	
2016–17	Bobby Despotovski	Perth Glory	
2017–18	Melissa Andreatta	Brisbane Roar	
2018–19	Jeff Hopkins	Melbourne Victory	
2019–20	Rado Vidošić	Melbourne City	
2020–21	Jeff Hopkins	Melbourne Victory	
2021–22	Adrian Stenta	Adelaide United	
2022–23	Mark Torcaso	Western United	
2023–24	Emily Husband	Central Coast Mariners	
2024–25	Adrian Stenta	Adelaide United	
2025–26	Antoni Jagarinec	Canberra United	

=== Referee of the Year ===
Year	Winner	Reference
2008–09	Jacqui Melksham	
2009	Kate Jacewicz	
2010–11	Kate Jacewicz	
2011–12	Kate Jacewicz	
2012–13	Kate Jacewicz	
2013–14	Casey Reibelt	
2014	Kate Jacewicz	
2015–16	Kate Jacewicz	
2016–17	Kate Jacewicz	
2017–18	Casey Reibelt	
2018–19	Kate Jacewicz	
2019–20	Rebecca Durcau	
2020–21	Rebecca Durcau	
2021–22	Lara Lee	
2022–23	Casey Reibelt	
2023–24	Casey Reibelt	
2024–25	Izzy Cooper	
2025–26	Isabella Mossin	

=== Fair Play Award ===
Year	Winner	Reference
2008–09	Queensland Roar	
2009	Canberra United; Sydney FC	
2010–11	Melbourne Victory	
2011–12	Melbourne Victory; Canberra United	
2012–13	Sydney FC	
2013–14	Brisbane Roar FC; Melbourne Victory; Newcastle Jets	
2014	Adelaide United	
2015–16	Melbourne City	
2016–17	Adelaide United	
2017–18	Melbourne Victory	
2018–19	Newcastle Jets	
2019–20	Melbourne Victory; Newcastle Jets; Perth Glory	
2020–21	Brisbane Roar	
2021–22	Not announced	
2022–23	Canberra United	
2023–24	Melbourne City	
2024–25	Melbourne City	
2025–26	Adelaide United	

== Previous awards ==
=== FMA Player of the Year ===
Year	Winner	Club	Reference
2012–13	Samantha Kerr	Sydney FC	
2013–14	Jess Fishlock	Melbourne Victory	

=== Player's Player of the Year ===
Year	Winner	Club	Reference
2009	Samantha Kerr	Perth Glory	
2010–11	Kyah Simon	Sydney FC	
2011–12	Lydia Williams	Canberra United	
2012–13	Tameka Butt	Brisbane Roar	
2013–14	Jess Fishlock	Melbourne Victory	
2014	Samantha Kerr	Perth Glory	
2015–16	Kim Little	Melbourne City	

== See also ==
- W-League records and statistics
