= A-League Women Coach of the Year =

- Awarded for: The outstanding manager in each given A-League Women season
- Country: Australia
- Presented by: Football Australia
- First award: 2009
- Final award: 2025
- Coach of the Year: Antoni Jagarinec

Highlights
- Most awards: Jeff Hopkins (3)

The A-League Women Coach of the Year is an annual soccer award presented to coaches in Australia. It recognises the most outstanding manager in the A-League Women each season. The recipient is chosen by a vote of all coaches at the conclusion of the regular season.

In 2009, the inaugural Coach of the Year award was given to Jeff Hopkins, who guided Queensland Roar to the premiership-championship double. The current holder of the award is Antoni Jagarinec of Canberra United.

Jitka Klimková was the first female recipient of the award in 2012 with Canberra United. The only other female recipients of the award are Melissa Andreatta who received the award in 2018 with Brisbane Roar and Emily Husband who received the award in 2024 with Central Coast Mariners.

Only one coach has won the award three times, Jeff Hopkins in 2009 with the Roar, and in 2019 and 2021 with Melbourne Victory.

== Winners ==
Season	Manager	Nationality	Club	Ref
2008–09	Jeff Hopkins	Wales	Queensland Roar	
2009	Ray Junna Stephen Roche	Australia; Australia	Canberra United; Central Coast Mariners	
2010–11	Alen Stajcic	Australia	Sydney FC	
2011–12	Jitka Klimková	Czech Republic	Canberra United	
2012–13	Mike Mulvey	Australia	Melbourne Victory	
2013–14	Alen Stajcic (2)	Australia	Sydney FC	
2014	Peter McGuinness	Australia	Newcastle Jets	
2015–16	Craig Deans	Australia	Newcastle Jets	
2016–17	Bobby Despotovski	Australia	Perth Glory	
2017–18	Melissa Andreatta	Australia	Brisbane Roar	
2018–19	Jeff Hopkins (2)	Wales	Melbourne Victory	
2019–20	Rado Vidošić	Australia	Melbourne City	
2020–21	Jeff Hopkins (3)	Wales	Melbourne Victory	
2021–22	Adrian Stenta	Australia	Adelaide United	
2022–23	Mark Torcaso	Australia	Western United	
2023–24	Emily Husband	England	Central Coast Mariners	
2024–25	Adrian Stenta (2)	Australia	Adelaide United	
2025–26	Antoni Jagarinec	Australia	Canberra United	

== Awards won by nationality ==
Country	Wins
Australia	14
Wales	3
Czech Republic	1
England	1

== Awards won by club ==
Club	Wins
Canberra United	3
Melbourne Victory	3
Adelaide United	2
Brisbane Roar	2
Central Coast Mariners	2
Newcastle Jets	2
Sydney FC	2
Melbourne City	1
Perth Glory	1
Western United	1
