= A-League Women Goal of the Year =

Australian soccer award

The A-League Women Goal of the Season is an annual soccer award for the player deemed to have scored the best goal in the preceding A-League Women season.

The award was first given following the 2008–09 season and has been awarded under the Dolan Warren Awards since. The first recipient of the award was Perth Glory's Marianna Tabain for her goal away at Adelaide United. The last recipient of the award was Central Coast Mariners' Peta Trimis for her goal at home against Melbourne Victory.

== Winners ==
Key
**Bold**	Player still active in the A-League Women
†	Indicates player who also won the A-League Women Golden Boot award in the same season
§	Denotes the club were A-League Women champions in the same season
Italics	Home team

Season	Player	Nationality	Team	Opponent	Date	Ref.
2008–09	Marianna Tabain	Australia	Perth Glory	Adelaide United	19 December 2008	
2009	Sam Kerr	Australia	Perth Glory	Sydney FC	21 November 2009	
2010–11	Heather Garriock	Australia	Sydney FC	Brisbane Roar	6 November 2010	
2011–12	Racheal Quigley	Australia	Adelaide United	Perth Glory	5 November 2011	
2012–13	Emily van Egmond	Australia	Newcastle Jets	Perth Glory	5 January 2013	
2013–14	Sally Shipard	Australia	Canberra United	Newcastle Jets	1 February 2014	
2014	Ashleigh Sykes	Australia	Canberra United ^{§}	Perth Glory	7 December 2014	
2015–16	Vanessa DiBernardo	United States	Perth Glory	Brisbane Roar	15 November 2015	
2016–17	Sam Kerr	Australia	Perth Glory	Sydney FC	11 December 2016	
2017–18	Lisa De Vanna	Australia	Sydney FC	Canberra United	15 December 2017	
2018–19	Cortnee Vine	Australia	Newcastle Jets	Canberra United	17 November 2018	
2019–20	Amy Jackson	Australia	Melbourne Victory	Perth Glory	28 December 2019	
2020–21	Lisa De Vanna	Australia	Melbourne Victory ^{§}	Melbourne City	10 January 2021	
2021–22	**Rachel Lowe**	Australia	Sydney FC	Wellington Phoenix	30 December 2021	
2022–23	Madison Haley	United States	Sydney FC ^{§}	Brisbane Roar	10 December 2022	
2023–24	**Cassidy Davis**	Australia	Newcastle Jets	Western Sydney Wanderers	5 November 2023	
2024–25	**Alana Jancevski**	Australia	Melbourne Victory	Sydney FC	24 January 2025	
2025–26	**Peta Trimis**	Australia	Central Coast Mariners	Melbourne Victory	27 December 2025	

== Awards won by nationality ==
Country	Players	Total
Australia	14	16
United States	2	2

== Awards won by club ==
Club	Players	Total
Perth Glory	3	4
Sydney FC	4	4
Melbourne Victory	3	3
Newcastle Jets	3	3
Canberra United	2	2
Adelaide United	1	1
Central Coast Mariners	1	1

== See also ==
- A-League Women Coach of the Year
- A-League Women Young Footballer of the Year
