= 2025–26 A-League Women =

Eighteenth edition of the top Australian women's football (soccer) league

A-League Women
- Season: 2025–26
- Dates: 31 October 2025 – 16 May 2026
- Champions: Melbourne City (5th title)
- Premiers: Melbourne City (5th title)
- AFC Champions League: Melbourne City
- Matches: 110
- Goals: 305 (2.77 per match)
- Top goalscorer: Holly McNamara (12 goals)
- Biggest home win: Wellington Phoenix 7–0 Sydney FC (20 December 2025)
- Biggest away win: Newcastle Jets 1–5 Wellington Phoenix (1 February 2026)
- Highest scoring: Wellington Phoenix 7–0 Sydney FC (20 December 2025); Adelaide United 5–2 Western Sydney Wanderers (27 December 2025); Melbourne City 5–2 Brisbane Roar (8 February 2026)
- Longest winning run: 4 matches Canberra United; Melbourne City
- Longest unbeaten run: 7 matches Canberra United
- Longest winless run: 9 matches Sydney FC
- Longest losing run: 4 matches Newcastle Jets; Perth Glory
- All statistics correct as of 5 April 2026. (Note: Longest runs only include regular season results)

The 2025–26 A-League Women, known as the Ninja A-League for sponsorship reasons, was the eighteenth season of A-League Women, the Australian national women's soccer competition. The competition began on 31 October 2025.

Melbourne City were the defending premiers and Central Coast Mariners were the defending champions. Melbourne City won both their fifth premiership and championship at the end of the season.

== Clubs ==
The number of clubs reduced from 12 in the 2024–25 season to 11, following the removal of Western United by Football Australia for financial reasons.

=== Stadiums and locations ===

Club	City	Home ground	Capacity
Adelaide United	Adelaide	Coopers Stadium	16,500
Adelaide United	Adelaide	Marden Sports Complex	6,000
Adelaide United	Adelaide	ServiceFM Stadium	7,000
Brisbane Roar	Brisbane	Imperial Corp Stadium	5,000
Canberra United	Canberra	McKellar Park	3,500
Central Coast Mariners	Gosford	Industree Group Stadium	20,059
Central Coast Mariners	Woy Woy	Woy Woy Oval	1,500
Melbourne City	Melbourne	AAMI Park	30,050
Melbourne City	Melbourne	City Football Academy	9,000
Melbourne Victory	Melbourne	AAMI Park	30,050
Melbourne Victory	Melbourne	The Home of the Matildas	3,000
Newcastle Jets	Newcastle	Newcastle Number 2 Sports Ground	5,000
Newcastle Jets	Newcastle	McDonald Jones Stadium	33,000
Newcastle Jets	Maitland	Maitland Regional Sportsground	8,000
Perth Glory	Perth	Sam Kerr Football Centre	2,500
Perth Glory	Perth	HBF Park	20,500
Sydney FC	Sydney	Leichhardt Oval	20,000
Sydney FC	Sydney	Allianz Stadium	42,500
Wellington Phoenix	Porirua	Jerry Collins Stadium	1,900
Western Sydney Wanderers	Sydney	CommBank Stadium	30,000
Western Sydney Wanderers	Sydney	Wanderers Football Park	1,000

=== Personnel and kits ===
Team	Manager	Captain	Kit manufacturers	Kit sponsors
Adelaide United	(Australia) Theo Tsiounis	(Australia) Isabel Hodgson	UCAN	Flinders University
Brisbane Roar	(United States) Alex Smith	(Australia) Tameka Yallop	Cikers	Ausenco
Canberra United	(Australia) Antoni Jagarinec	(Australia) Michelle Heyman	KonQa	University of Canberra; ClubLime (Note: Away kit)
Central Coast Mariners	(Australia) Kory Babington	(Australia) Taren King	Cikers	Budget
Melbourne City	(Australia) Michael Matricciani	(New Zealand) Rebekah Stott	Puma	Etihad Airways
Melbourne Victory	(Wales) Jeff Hopkins	(United States) Kayla Morrison	Macron	Turkish Airlines
Newcastle Jets	(England) Stephen Hoyle	(Australia) Cassidy Davis	New Balance	nib
Perth Glory	(Australia) Stephen Peters	(Australia) Isobel Dalton	Macron	Boom Logistics
Sydney FC	(Australia) James Slaveski (caretaker)	(Australia) Natalie Tobin	Under Armour	Macquarie University
Wellington Phoenix	(England) Bev Priestman	(New Zealand) CJ Bott	Dynasty Sport	Oppo; Entelar Group
Western Sydney Wanderers	(Australia) Geoff Abrahams	(Australia) Amy Harrison	Adidas	Herbalife

=== Managerial changes ===
Team	Outgoing manager	Manner of departure	Date of vacancy	Position on table	Incoming manager	Date of appointment
Wellington Phoenix	(England) Paul Temple	End of contract	17 April 2025	Pre-season	(England) Bev Priestman	30 July 2025
Newcastle Jets	(Australia) Ryan Campbell	End of contract	16 May 2025	Pre-season	(England) Stephen Hoyle	3 June 2025
Central Coast Mariners	(England) Emily Husband	Signed by Football Australia as Matildas assistant coach	9 June 2025	Pre-season	(Australia) Kory Babington	25 August 2025
Adelaide United	(Australia) Adrian Stenta	Signed by Adelaide United Men as assistant coach	25 June 2025	Pre-season	(Australia) Theo Tsiounis	17 July 2025
Sydney	(Australia) Ante Juric	Resigned	3 February 2026	10th	(Australia) James Slaveski (caretaker)	3 February 2026

=== Foreign players ===
Club	Visa 1	Visa 2	Visa 3	Visa 4	Visa 5	Non-Visa foreigner(s)	Former player(s)
Adelaide United	(Republic of Ireland) Erin Healy					(New Zealand) Claudia Jenkins^{A}	(England) Fiona Worts
Brisbane Roar	(Japan) Momo Hayashi	(Netherlands) Bente Jansen	(United States) Ashlyn Miller	(United States) Marianna Seidl	(United States) Josie Studer	(Philippines) Angela Beard^{A}	
Canberra United	(Japan) Nanako Sasaki	(New Zealand) Elizabeth Anton	(United States) Josie Aulicino	(United States) Emma Hawkins	(United States) Jazmin Wardlow	(Serbia) Mary Stanić-Floody^{A}	
Central Coast Mariners	(England) Millie Farrow	(Switzerland) Lorena Baumann	(United States) Cannon Clough			(United States) Blake Hughes^{B}	
Melbourne City	(England) Danielle Turner	(England) Ellie Wilson	(Nigeria) Chinaza Uchendu	(Spain) Malena Mieres	(United States) Taylor Otto	(New Zealand) Deven Jackson^{B} (Wales) Laura Hughes^{A}	
Melbourne Victory	(New Zealand) Claudia Bunge	(New Zealand) Zoe McMeeken	(United States) Kennedy White	(United States) Payton Woodward		(United States) Kayla Morrison^{B}	
Newcastle Jets	(New Zealand) Kelli Brown	(New Zealand) Charlotte Lancaster	(New Zealand) Anna Leat	(New Zealand) Olivia Page			
Perth Glory	(Nigeria) Onyinyechi Zogg	(Philippines) Emma Tovar	(United States) Rola Badawiya	(United States) Gabby Hollar	(Wales) Megan Wynne		
Sydney FC	(Panama) Riley Tanner	(Philippines) Madison Ayson	(United States) Heather Hinz	(United States) Jodi Ülkekul		(Croatia) Bianca Galic^{A}	(Haiti) Laurie-Ann Moïse
Wellington Phoenix	(Dominican Republic) Lucía León	(England) Brooke Nunn	(Nepal) Sabitra Bhandari	(Netherlands) Tessel Middag	(United States) Ellie Walker	(Lebanon) Tiana Jaber^{A} (United States) Mackenzie Anthony^{R} (United States) Makala Woods^{R}	
Western Sydney Wanderers	(China) Wang Ying	(China) Yuan Cong	(Japan) Ena Harada	(Philippines) Janae DeFazio	(South Korea) Kim So-eun	(New Zealand) Ava Collins^{R} (New Zealand) Brianna Edwards^{A} (Portugal) Siena Arrarte^{A}	

The following do not fill a Visa position:
- ^{A} Australian citizens who have last represented other countries at international level
- ^{B} Those players who were born and started their professional career abroad but have since gained Australian citizenship
- ^{R} Injury replacement players, or national team replacement players

== Regular season ==
=== League table ===
Pos	Team	Pld	W	D	L	GF	GA	GD	Pts	Qualification
1	Melbourne City (C)	20	12	4	4	36	20	+16	40	Qualification for AFC Women's Champions League and Finals series
2	Wellington Phoenix (Note: Wellington Phoenix cannot qualify for the AFC Women's Champions League as they are based in New Zealand, which is part of the Oceania Football Confederation.)	20	10	4	6	38	17	+21	34	Qualification for Finals series
3	Canberra United	20	9	4	7	30	24	+6	31	Qualification for Finals series
4	Brisbane Roar	20	9	4	7	37	39	−2	31	Qualification for Finals series
5	Adelaide United	20	9	3	8	24	26	−2	30	Qualification for Finals series
6	Melbourne Victory	20	8	4	8	27	24	+3	28	Qualification for Finals series
7	Central Coast Mariners	20	7	7	6	27	26	+1	28	
8	Perth Glory	20	7	3	10	20	30	−10	24	
9	Newcastle Jets	20	7	2	11	30	36	−6	23	
10	Sydney FC	20	4	7	9	18	29	−11	19	
11	Western Sydney Wanderers	20	5	4	11	18	34	−16	19	

Source: A-Leagues
Rules for classification: 1) points; 2) goal difference; 3) goals scored; 4) wins; 5) head-to-head results; 5a) head-to-head points; 5b) head-to-head goal difference; 6) Fair Play points; 7) away goal difference; 8) away goals per match; 9) home goal difference; 10) home goals per match; 11) toss of a coin in an event of a tie of two clubs.
(C) Champions

=== Results ===
Individual matches are collated at each club's season article.

Home-and-away

Home \ Away	ADL	BRI	CAN	CCM	MCY	MVC	NEW	PER	SYD	WEL	WSW
Adelaide United		1–3	2–1	1–0	2–1	2–1	1–3	2–1	0–0	0–2	5–2
Brisbane Roar	0–2		3–1	2–2	1–1	3–2	4–2	5–2	0–4	2–2	0–1
Canberra United	3–2	1–2		1–1	2–1	3–1	1–2	3–0	2–0	0–2	3–0
Central Coast Mariners	3–0	3–2	0–0		1–3	3–3	4–1	1–1	0–0	2–1	1–2
Melbourne City	0–0	5–2	3–1	4–0		2–1	1–3	3–1	1–0	1–0	0–1
Melbourne Victory	1–0	0–1	1–3	1–0	0–0		2–1	3–0	0–0	1–1	1–0
Newcastle Jets	1–2	3–0	0–1	1–2	1–2	1–3		2–3	3–1	1–5	1–0
Perth Glory	1–0	2–3	1–0	0–0	0–2	0–1	1–0		0–0	1–0	3–1
Sydney FC	0–0	1–3	1–2	1–0	2–2	2–1	1–2	2–0		1–3	2–3
Wellington Phoenix	3–1	3–0	1–1	1–2	1–2	1–0	1–1	1–0	7–0		0–1
Western Sydney Wanderers	0–1	1–1	1–1	1–2	1–2	1–4	1–1	1–3	0–0	0–3	

Source: A-League Women
Legend: Blue = home team win; Yellow = draw; Red = away team win.

== Finals series ==
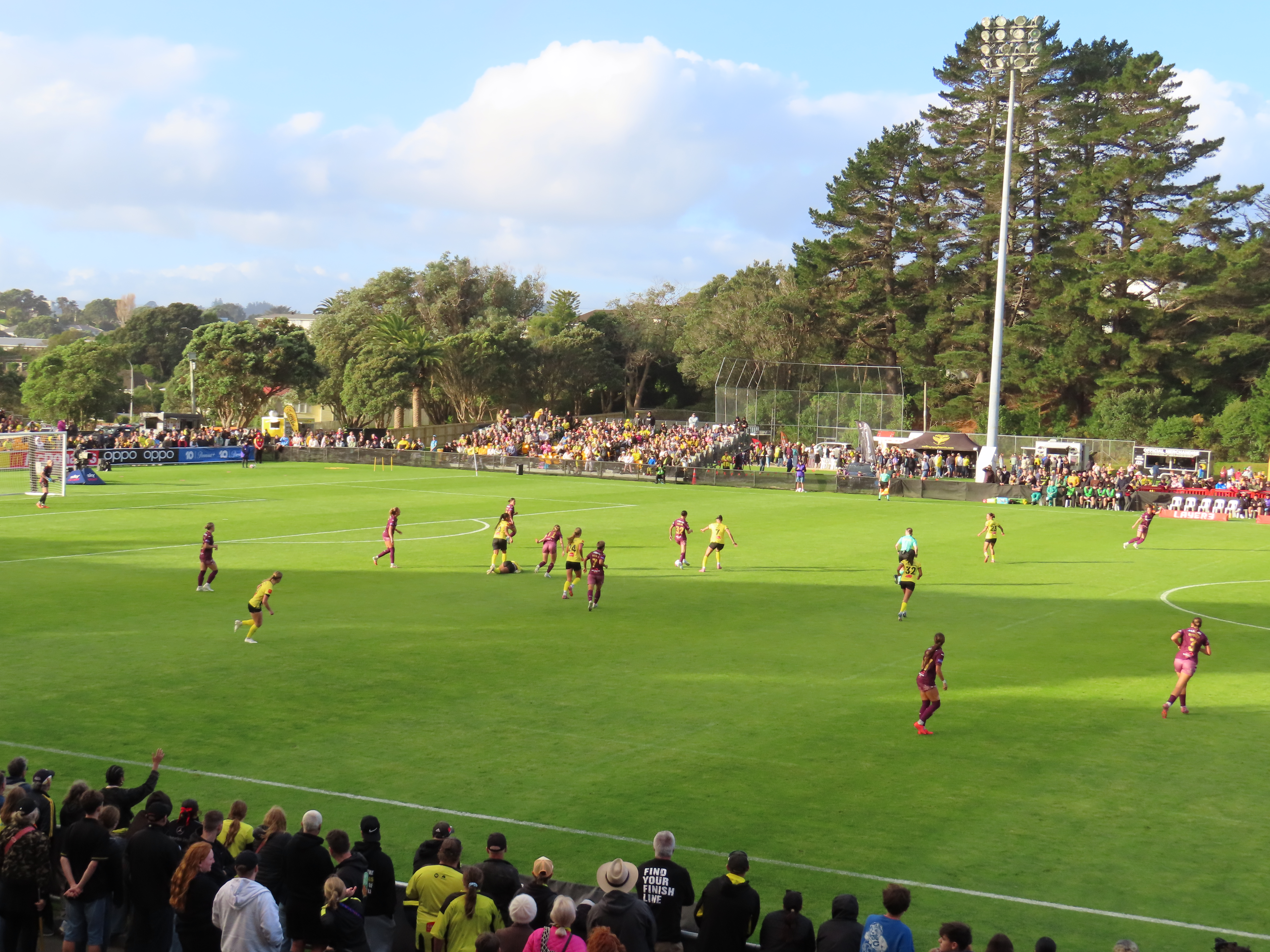
Semifinal match between Wellington Phoenix and Brisbane Roar on 10 May 2026.

The finals series will run over four weeks, involving the top six teams from the regular season. In the first week of fixtures, the third-through-sixth ranked teams play a single-elimination match, with the two winners of those matches joining the first and second ranked teams in two-legged semi-final ties. The two winners of those matches meet in the Grand Final.

=== Bracket ===
Elimination-finals
3	Canberra United	1
6	Melbourne Victory	3
4	Brisbane Roar	3
5	Adelaide United	0

Semi-finals
1	Melbourne City	1	1	2
6	Melbourne Victory	0	0	0
2	Wellington Phoenix	1	2	3
4	Brisbane Roar	2	0	2

Grand Final
1	Melbourne City	3
2	Wellington Phoenix	1

=== Elimination-finals ===
25 April 2026
17:00 AEST (UTC+10:00)

Brisbane Roar	3–0	Adelaide United
Stephenson 51', 57'; Medwin 83'	Report

Imperial Corp Stadium, Brisbane
Attendance: 3,500
Referee: Lara Lee

25 April 2026
14:00 AEST (UTC+10:00)

Canberra United	1–3	Melbourne Victory
Grove 29'	Report	Lowe 21'; O'Grady 24', 51'

McKellar Park, Canberra
Attendance: 3,290
Referee: Caitlin Williams

=== Semi-finals ===
==== Summary ====
Team 1	Agg.	Team 2	1st leg	2nd leg
Melbourne City	2–0	Melbourne Victory	1–0	1–0
Wellington Phoenix	3–2	Brisbane Roar	1–2	2–0 (a.e.t.)

==== Matches ====
2 May 2026
17:00 AEST (UTC+10:00)

Melbourne Victory	0–1	Melbourne City
	Report	McKenna 45'

AAMI Park, Melbourne
Attendance: 4,953
Referee: Sophie Allum
9 May 2026
14:00 AEST (UTC+10:00)

Melbourne City	1–0	Melbourne Victory
McMahon 34'	Report

ctrl:cyber Pitch, Melbourne
Attendance: 1,607
Referee: Mikayla Ryan

Melbourne City won 2–0 on aggregate.

3 May 2026
17:00 AEST (UTC+10:00)

Brisbane Roar	2–1	Wellington Phoenix
Hayashi 14'; Brown 72'	Report	Jale 2'

Imperial Corp Stadium, Brisbane
Attendance: 3,849
Referee: Isabella Mossin
10 May 2026
14:30 NZST (UTC+12:00)

Wellington Phoenix	2–0 (a.e.t.)	Brisbane Roar
Woods 42', 102'	Report

Jerry Collins Stadium, Porirua
Attendance: 5,923
Referee: Caitlin Williams

Wellington Phoenix won 3–2 on aggregate.

=== Grand Final ===
16 May 2026
16:15 AEST (UTC+10:00)

Melbourne City	3–1	Wellington Phoenix
McNamara 41', 43'; McKenna 49'	Report	Woods 52'

AAMI Park, Melbourne
Attendance: 7,174
Referee: Isabella Mossin

== Regular season statistics ==
=== Top scorers ===
As of end of the regular season

Rank	Player	Club	Goals
1	(Australia) Holly McNamara	Melbourne City	12
2	(Australia) Annalise Rasmussen	Central Coast Mariners	11
3	(Australia) Melina Ayres	Newcastle Jets	8
3	(Netherlands) Bente Jansen	Brisbane Roar	8
3	(United States) Kennedy White	Melbourne Victory	8
5	(Australia) Daisy Brown	Brisbane Roar	7
5	(Australia) Rhianna Pollicina	Melbourne Victory	7
8	(New Zealand) Kelli Brown	Newcastle Jets	6
8	(Australia) Michelle Heyman	Canberra United	6
8	(Australia) Aideen Keane	Melbourne City	6
8	(England) Brooke Nunn	Wellington Phoenix	6
8	(New Zealand) Pia Vlok	Wellington Phoenix	6

=== Hat-tricks ===
Player	For	Against	Result	Date	Ref.
(United States) Kennedy White	Melbourne Victory	Western Sydney Wanderers	4–1 (A)	9 November 2025	
(Australia) Holly McNamara	Melbourne City	Perth Glory	3–1 (H)	28 December 2025	
(New Zealand) Pia Vlok	Wellington Phoenix	Newcastle Jets	6–1 (A)	1 February 2026	
(Australia) Daisy Brown	Brisbane Roar	Newcastle Jets	4–2 (H)	20 March 2026	

Key
(H)	Home team
(A)	Away team

=== Clean sheets ===
As of end of the regular season

Rank	Goalkeeper	Club	Clean sheets
1	(New Zealand) Victoria Esson	Wellington Phoenix	7
1	(Australia) Courtney Newbon	Melbourne Victory	7
3	(United States) Heather Hinz	Sydney FC	6
3	(Spain) Malena Mieres	Melbourne City	6
3	(Australia) Teresa Morrissey	Perth Glory	6
6	(Australia) Sally James	Canberra United	5
6	(Australia) Ilona Melegh	Adelaide United	5
8	(Australia) Sham Khamis	Western Sydney Wanderers	4
9	(Australia) Annalee Grove	Central Coast Mariners	3
9	(Australia) Tiahna Robertson	Sydney FC	3

== End-of-season awards ==
The following awards were announced at the 2025–26 Dolan Warren Awards night that took place on 21 May 2026.

- Julie Dolan Medal – Isabel Gomez (Central Coast Mariners)
- Young Footballer of the Year – Pia Vlok (Wellington Phoenix)
- Golden Boot Award – Holly McNamara (Melbourne City) (12 goals)
- Goalkeeper of the Year – Courtney Newbon (Melbourne Victory)
- Coach of the Year – Antoni Jagarinec (Canberra United)
- Referee of the Year – Isabella Mossin
- Fair Play Award – Adelaide United
- Goal of the Year – Peta Trimis (Central Coast Mariners v Melbourne Victory, 27 December 2025)
- Save of the Year – Claudia Jenkins (Adelaide United)
- Playmaker of the Year – Brooke Nunn (Wellington Phoenix)
- Fan Player of the Year – Bethany Gordon (Canberra United)

=== Club awards ===
Club	Player of the Season	Ref.
Adelaide United	(Australia) Ella Tonkin	
Brisbane Roar	(Japan) Momo Hayashi	
Canberra United	(New Zealand) Elizabeth Anton	
Central Coast Mariners	(Australia) Greta Krazula	
Melbourne City	(New Zealand) Rebekah Stott	
Melbourne Victory	(Australia) Rachel Lowe	
Newcastle Jets	(Australia) Sophie Hoban	
Perth Glory	(Australia) Tijan McKenna	
Sydney FC	(Australia) Willa Pearson	
Wellington Phoenix	(New Zealand) Grace Jale	
Western Sydney Wanderers	(Australia) Talia Younis	

== See also ==
- 2025–26 A-League Men
- A-League Women transfers for 2025–26 season
- 2025–26 Adelaide United FC (women) season
- 2025–26 Brisbane Roar FC (women) season
- 2025–26 Canberra United FC (women) season
- 2025–26 Central Coast Mariners FC (women) season
- 2025–26 Melbourne City FC (women) season
- 2025–26 Melbourne Victory FC (women) season
- 2025–26 Newcastle Jets FC (women) season
- 2025–26 Perth Glory FC (women) season
- 2025–26 Sydney FC (women) season
- 2025–26 Wellington Phoenix FC (women) season
- 2025–26 Western Sydney Wanderers FC (women) season
- 2025–26 Western United FC (women) season
