= A-League Women Golden Glove =

Australian women's football (soccer) award

- Awarded for: The top goalkeeper in a given A-League Women season.
- Country: Australia
- Presented by: Football Australia
- First award: 2008
- Currently held by: Courtney Newbon

Highlights
- Most wins: Lydia Williams (5)

The A-League Women Golden Glove is an annual football (soccer) award presented to the top goalkeeper in the Australian A-League Women.

The A-League Women was established as the W-League in 2008 as the top tier of women's football in Australia. The award is given to the top goalkeeper over the regular season (not including the finals series). The inaugural award was won by Melissa Barbieri of Melbourne Victory.

Lydia Williams has won the award five times. Mackenzie Arnold has won the award three times and Melissa Barbieri has won twice.

== Winners ==
Key
Goalkeeper ^{X}	Name of the player and ^{X} the number of times they had won the award at that point (if more than one)
§	Denotes the club were A-League Women Champions in the same season
†	Indicates multiple award winners in the same season

Year	Goalkeeper	Club	Reference
2008–09	Melissa Barbieri	Melbourne Victory	
2009	Jillian Loyden	Central Coast Mariners	
2010–11	Lydia Williams	Canberra United	
2011–12	Lydia Williams ^{2}	Canberra United	
2012–13	Mackenzie Arnold	Canberra United	
2013–14	Melissa Barbieri ^{2}	Adelaide United	
2014	Mackenzie Arnold ^{2}	Perth Glory	
2015–16	Kaitlyn Savage	Adelaide United	
2016–17	Lydia Williams ^{3}	Melbourne City	
2017–18	Mackenzie Arnold ^{3}	Brisbane Roar	
2018–19	Aubrey Bledsoe	Sydney FC	
2018–19	Lydia Williams ^{4}	Melbourne City	
2019–20	Lydia Williams ^{5}	Melbourne City	
2020–21	Teagan Micah	Melbourne City	
2021–22	Casey Dumont	Melbourne Victory	
2022–23	Hillary Beall	Western United	
2023–24	Morgan Aquino	Perth Glory	
2024–25	Sarah Langman	Central Coast Mariners	
2025–26	Courtney Newbon	Melbourne Victory	

== Awards won by club ==
Club	Total
Melbourne City	4
Melbourne Victory	4
Canberra United	3
Adelaide United	2
Central Coast Mariners	2
Perth Glory	2
Brisbane Roar	1
Sydney FC	1
Western United	1

== See also ==
- List of sports awards honoring women
- A-League Women records and statistics
- Julie Dolan Medal
