= 2023–24 A-League Women =

Sixteenth edition of the top Australian women's football (soccer) league

A-League Women
- Season: 2023–24
- Dates: 13 October 2023 – 4 May 2024
- Champions: Sydney FC (5th title)
- Premiers: Melbourne City (3rd title)
- AFC Champions League: Melbourne City
- Matches: 139
- Goals: 421 (3.03 per match)
- Top goalscorer: Michelle Heyman (17)
- Biggest home win: Melbourne Victory 4–0 Newcastle Jets (12 November 2023); Canberra United 5–1 Brisbane Roar (10 December 2023)
- Biggest away win: Adelaide United 0–8 Newcastle Jets (29 March 2024)
- Highest scoring: Melbourne City 5–3 Brisbane Roar (28 December 2023); Melbourne Victory 5–3 Wellington Phoenix (3 March 2024); Adelaide United 0–8 Newcastle Jets (29 March 2024)
- Longest winning run: 6 matches Western United
- Longest unbeaten run: 7 matches Melbourne Victory
- Longest winless run: 9 matches Perth Glory
- Longest losing run: 4 matches Adelaide United; Wellington Phoenix
- Highest attendance: 11,471; Sydney FC 2–0 Western Sydney Wanderers (14 October 2023)
- Lowest attendance: 263; Melbourne City 1–1 Adelaide United (18 February 2024)
- Total attendance: 312,199
- Average attendance: 2,246
- All statistics correct as of 29 September 2024. (Note: Longest runs only include regular season results)

The 2023–24 A-League Women, known as the Liberty A-League for sponsorship reasons, was the sixteenth season of A-League Women, the Australian national women's soccer competition.

The season commenced on 14 October and had a full double round-robin regular season for the first time. The Grand Final was contested on 4 May 2024.

Central Coast Mariners re-joined the competition, having played in the first two seasons before exiting due to financial reasons.

Sydney FC were the defending premiers and champions, and successfully defended their championship. The premiers were Sydney's defeated opponent in the Grand Final, Melbourne City FC.

Ahead of the season, a new collective bargaining agreement was agreed, including a 20 percent increase to the salary cap, removing the cap of New Zealand players for Wellington Phoenix, and expanding the foreign player spots from 4 to 5, in line with the A-League Men competition.

With a total attendance of 284,551 as of 15 April 2024, the 2023–24 A-League Women season set the record for the most attended season of any women's sport in Australian history, with the season finishing with a final total attendance of 312,199.

== Clubs ==

=== Stadiums and locations ===
Team	Location	Stadium	Capacity
Adelaide United	Adelaide	Coopers Stadium; Marden Sports Complex	16,500; 6,000
Brisbane Roar	Brisbane	Ballymore Stadium; Perry Park	8,000; 5,000
Canberra United	Canberra	McKellar Park	3,500
Central Coast Mariners	Gosford	Industree Group Stadium	20,059
Melbourne City	Melbourne	AAMI Park; City Football Academy	30,050; 9,000
Melbourne Victory	Melbourne	AAMI Park; The Home of the Matildas	30,050; 3,000
Newcastle Jets	Newcastle	Newcastle Number 2 Sports Ground; McDonald Jones Stadium	5,000; 33,000
Perth Glory	Perth	Macedonia Park; HBF Park	7,000; 20,500
Sydney FC	Sydney	Jubilee Oval; Leichhardt Oval; Sydney Olympic Park Athletic Centre	20,505; 20,000; 5,000
Wellington Phoenix	Wellington; Porirua; Auckland	Sky Stadium; Jerry Collins Stadium; Go Media Mount Smart Stadium	34,500; 1,900; 30,000
Western Sydney Wanderers	Sydney	Marconi Stadium; CommBank Stadium; Wanderers Football Park	9,000; 30,000; 1,000
Western United	Wyndham	City Vista Recreation Reserve	4,000

=== Personnel and kits ===
Team	Manager	Captain	Kit manufacturers	Kit sponsors
Adelaide United	(Australia) Adrian Stenta	(Australia) Isabel Hodgson	UCAN	Kite
Brisbane Roar	(United States) Alex Smith	(Australia) Ayesha Norrie	New Balance	Ausenco
Canberra United	(Australia) Njegosh Popovich	(Australia) Michelle Heyman	ISC Sport	University of Canberra
Central Coast Mariners	(England) Emily Husband	(Australia) Taren King	Cikers	DMC Conveyor Services
Melbourne City	(Australia) Dario Vidošić (caretaker)	(New Zealand) Rebekah Stott	Puma	Etihad Airways
Melbourne Victory	(Wales) Jeff Hopkins	(United States) Kayla Morrison	Macron	MATE
Newcastle Jets	(Australia) Ryan Campbell (caretaker)	(Australia) Cassidy Davis	Legend Sportswear	Port of Newcastle
Perth Glory	(Australia) Alex Epakis	(Australia) Natasha Rigby	Macron	Gold Valley
Sydney FC	(Australia) Ante Juric	(Australia) Natalie Tobin (Australia) Princess Ibini (Note: After Natalie Tobin was injured in round 1 and ruled out for the season, Ibini replaced her as captain.)	Under Armour	Macquarie University
Wellington Phoenix	(England) Paul Temple	(New Zealand) Annalie Longo	Paladin Sports	Oppo; Spark (Note: Away kit)
Western Sydney Wanderers	(Australia) Robbie Hooker	(Australia) Amy Harrison	Adidas	Intermain
Western United	(Australia) Kat Smith	(Philippines) Jaclyn Sawicki (Australia) Chloe Logarzo	Kappa	Sharp

=== Managerial changes ===
Team	Outgoing manager	Manner of departure	Date of vacancy	Position on table	Incoming manager	Date of appointment
Central Coast Mariners	Inaugural manager			Pre-season	(England) Emily Husband	2 March 2023
Wellington Phoenix	(England) Natalie Lawrence	End of contract	5 May 2023	Pre-season	(New Zealand) Paul Temple	7 May 2023
Western Sydney Wanderers	(Australia) Kat Smith	Resigned	4 October 2023	Pre-season	(Australia) Robbie Hooker	4 October 2023
Brisbane Roar	(Australia) Garrath McPherson	Sacked	13 November 2023	4th	(United States) Alex Smith	14 November 2023
Western United	(Australia) Mark Torcaso	Resigned	1 December 2023	8th	(Australia) Kat Smith	1 December 2023
Newcastle Jets	(Australia) Gary van Egmond	Signed by Chinese Football Association	15 January 2024	6th	(Australia) Ryan Campbell (caretaker)	15 January 2024

=== Foreign players ===
Club	Visa 1	Visa 2	Visa 3	Visa 4	Visa 5	Non-Visa foreigner(s)	Former player(s)
Adelaide United	(Japan) Nanako Sasaki	(Netherlands) Maruschka Waldus	(New Zealand) Hannah Blake	(United States) Jenna Holtz	(United States) Mariah Lee	(New Zealand) Rosetta Taylor^{A}	
Brisbane Roar	(Denmark) Hannah Holgersen	(United States) Mia Corbin	(United States) Leah Scarpelli			(Brazil) Mariel Hecher^{B} (Republic of Ireland) Deborah-Anne De la Harpe^{A}	(United States) Jordan Silkowitz
Canberra United	(New Zealand) Deven Jackson	(New Zealand) Ruby Nathan	(United States) Sarah Clark	(United States) Cannon Clough		(Serbia) Vesna Milivojević^{A}	(Chile) María José Rojas
Central Coast Mariners	(China) Wurigumula	(England) Faye Bryson	(Mexico) Briana Woodall	(United States) Rola Badawiya	(United States) Jazmin Wardlow	(Croatia) Bianca Galic^{A}	
Melbourne City	(Bosnia and Herzegovina) Emina Ekic	(Brazil) Bárbara	(New Zealand) Hannah Wilkinson	(United States) Julia Grosso	(United States) Taylor Otto	(New Zealand) Rebekah Stott^{A}	(Canada) Lysianne Proulx
Melbourne Victory	(Japan) Kurea Okino	(New Zealand) Geo Candy	(United States) Sara D'Appolonia	(United States) Tori Hansen		(United States) Kayla Morrison^{B}	(United States) McKenzie Weinert
Newcastle Jets	(Philippines) Sarina Bolden	(Switzerland) Lorena Baumann	(United States) Izzy Nino				(Democratic Republic of the Congo) Exaucée Kizinga (New Zealand) Rebecca Burrows
Perth Glory	(England) Millie Farrow	(New Zealand) Elizabeth Anton	(New Zealand) Grace Jale	(Philippines) Jessika Cowart	(Philippines) Quinley Quezada		
Sydney FC	(England) Fiona Worts	(United States) Shea Connors	(United States) Jordan Thompson				
Wellington Phoenix	(Canada) Rylee Foster	(United States) Hope Breslin	(United States) Isabel Cox	(United States) Hailey Davidson	(Venezuela) Mariana Speckmaier		
Western Sydney Wanderers	(United States) Vicky Bruce	(United States) Kaylie Collins	(United States) Maliah Morris				(New Zealand) Milly Clegg
Western United	(Denmark) Kathrine Larsen	(Japan) Keiwa Hieda	(Philippines) Jaclyn Sawicki	(United States) Hannah Keane	(United States) Catherine Zimmerman	(Serbia) Tyla-Jay Vlajnic^{A}	(United States) Hillary Beall

The following do not fill a Visa position:
- ^{A} Australian citizens who have chosen to represent another national team
- ^{B} Those players who were born and started their professional career abroad but have since gained Australian citizenship

== Regular season ==
=== League table ===
Pos	Team	Pld	W	D	L	GF	GA	GD	Pts	Qualification
1	Melbourne City	22	12	5	5	40	29	+11	41	Qualification to Finals series and 2024–25 AFC Women's Champions League
2	Sydney FC (C)	22	11	6	5	31	20	+11	39	Qualification to Finals series
3	Western United	22	11	3	8	37	34	+3	36	Qualification to Finals series
4	Melbourne Victory	22	10	6	6	44	29	+15	36	Qualification to Finals series
5	Central Coast Mariners	22	10	5	7	31	24	+7	35	Qualification to Finals series
6	Newcastle Jets	22	10	3	9	43	36	+7	33	Qualification to Finals series
7	Western Sydney Wanderers	22	10	3	9	30	30	0	33	
8	Wellington Phoenix (Note: Wellington Phoenix cannot qualify for Asian Football Confederation competitions as they are based in New Zealand, which is under the Oceania Football Confederation.)	22	9	1	12	36	33	+3	28	
9	Brisbane Roar	22	7	5	10	28	35	−7	26	
10	Perth Glory	22	6	6	10	25	32	−7	24	
11	Canberra United	22	6	6	10	39	47	−8	24	
12	Adelaide United	22	4	3	15	21	56	−35	15	

Source: A-Leagues
Rules for classification: 1) points; 2) wins; 3) goal difference; 4) goals scored; 5) head-to-head results; 6) Fair Play points; 7) away head-to-head results; 8) home head-to-head results; 9) toss of a coin
(C) Champions

=== Results ===
Individual matches are collated at each club's season article. Some fixtures in the first round were moved to larger venues following the success of the 2023 FIFA Women's World Cup.

Home \ Away	ADL	BRI	CAN	CCM	MCY	MVC	NEW	PER	SYD	WEL	WSW	WUN
Adelaide United		1–2	4–4	1–2	0–5	1–4	0–8	2–1	1–3	2–1	2–1	1–3
Brisbane Roar	1–1		1–2	0–2	2–0	1–2	1–2	2–0	1–0	2–1	1–1	0–1
Canberra United	3–1	5–1		0–3	3–1	2–3	3–4	2–3	1–0	1–0	1–1	1–1
Central Coast Mariners	2–0	1–1	4–1		1–1	1–1	0–1	1–2	0–0	1–0	1–2	1–1
Melbourne City	1–1	5–3	2–1	3–0		1–0	2–0	1–3	0–0	2–1	4–3	1–3
Melbourne Victory	2–0	1–2	2–0	2–1	0–0		4–0	1–1	1–1	5–3	4–0	1–4
Newcastle Jets	3–1	3–0	3–3	0–2	2–3	3–2		1–1	0–1	3–2	1–1	4–2
Perth Glory	2–1	0–0	2–2	1–3	1–2	2–2	1–0		0–0	1–3	0–2	2–0
Sydney FC	3–0	1–1	1–1	1–2	2–3	0–4	2–1	3–1		1–0	2–0	3–1
Wellington Phoenix	4–0	2–1	2–0	1–2	0–1	2–2	2–0	2–1	2–4		2–0	3–1
Western Sydney Wanderers	0–1	1–3	4–1	3–0	1–0	2–0	2–1	1–0	0–2	0–3		3–1
Western United	1–0	3–2	4–2	2–1	2–2	2–1	1–3	1–0	0–1	3–0	0–2	

Source: A-League Women
Legend: Blue = home team win; Yellow = draw; Red = away team win.

== Finals series ==
The finals series used the same format as A-League Men; run over four weeks, and involving the top six teams from the regular season. In the first week of fixtures, the third-through-sixth ranked teams played a single-elimination match, with the two winners of those matches joining the first and second ranked teams in two-legged semi-final ties; this was the first season that the A-League Women held two-legged semi-finals. The two winners of those matches met in the Grand Final. The previous format, which saw Sydney hosting the Grand Final until the 2024–25 season, was overturned in October 2023, reverting back to the higher-ranked semi-final winner hosting the match.

=== Bracket ===
Elimination-finals
4	Melbourne Victory	0 (2)
5	Central Coast Mariners (p)	0 (4)
3	Western United	2
6	Newcastle Jets (a.e.t.)	4

Semi-finals
1	Melbourne City	3	3	6
6	Newcastle Jets	0	0	0
2	Sydney FC	1	1	2
5	Central Coast Mariners	0	1	1

Grand final
1	Melbourne City	0
2	Sydney FC	1

=== Elimination-finals ===
Third-placed Western United, who qualified for successive finals series, played their first home finals match against sixth-placed Newcastle Jets (appearing in their first finals series since 2018). Newcastle took the lead 11 minutes in through Sarina Bolden until Western equalised by Alana Cerne. Bolden scored a penalty for Newcastle to take the lead into half-time, as Catherine Zimmerman score a penalty for Western to equalize again. In extra-time, Newcastle scored two further goals through Melina Ayres and Sophie Haban to win the match.

13 April 2024
18:30 AEST (UTC+10:00)

Western United	2–4 (a.e.t.)	Newcastle Jets
Cerne 22'; Zimmerman 68' (pen.)	Report	Bolden 11', 45+1' (pen.); Ayres 101'; Haban 113'

Ironbark Fields, Melbourne
Attendance: 3,370
Referee: Georgia Ghirardello

Fourth-placed Melbourne Victory hosted a finals match for the first time since 2020, against fifth-placed Central Coast Mariners who had not played in a finals series since 2009.

14 April 2024
16:00 AEST (UTC+10:00)

Melbourne Victory	0–0 (a.e.t.)	Central Coast Mariners
	Report
Penalties
Lowe (penalty scored); Chidiac (penalty scored); Murphy (penalty missed); Zois (penalty missed)	2–4	(penalty scored) Dumont; (penalty scored) Bryson; (penalty scored) Wurigumula; (penalty scored) Galic

Home of the Matildas, Melbourne
Attendance: 1,722
Referee: Rebecca Durcau

=== Semi-finals ===
==== Summary ====
Team 1	Agg.	Team 2	1st leg	2nd leg
Melbourne City	6–0	Newcastle Jets	3–0	3–0
Sydney FC	2–1	Central Coast Mariners	1–0	1–1

==== Matches ====
21 April 2024
15:00 AEST (UTC+10:00)

Newcastle Jets	0–3	Melbourne City
	Report	Galic 5'; Ekic 61'; McMahon 77'

Maitland Sportsground, Maitland
Attendance: 6,836
Referee: Bec Mackie
28 April 2024
13:00 AEST (UTC+10:00)

Melbourne City	3–0	Newcastle Jets
Pollicina 26'; Wilkinson 67'; McKenna 70'	Report

AAMI Park, Melbourne
Attendance: 2,041
Referee: Rebecca Durcau

Melbourne City won 6–0 on aggregate.

21 April 2024
15:00 AEST (UTC+10:00)

Central Coast Mariners	0–1	Sydney FC
	Report	Hawkesby 54'

Industree Group Stadium, Gosford
Attendance: 4,014
Referee: Isabella Mossin
27 April 2024
15:00 AEST (UTC+10:00)

Sydney FC	1–1	Central Coast Mariners
Hawkesby 30'	Report	Badawiya 43'

Leichhardt Oval, Sydney
Attendance: 7,063
Referee: Georgia Ghirardello

Sydney FC won 2–1 on aggregate.

=== Grand final ===
4 May 2024
16:15 AEST (UTC+10:00)

Melbourne City	0–1	Sydney FC
	Report	Connors 69'

AAMI Park, Melbourne
Attendance: 7,671
Referee: Casey Reibelt

== Regular season statistics ==
=== Top scorers ===
Rank	Player	Club	Goals
1	(Australia) Michelle Heyman	Canberra United	17
2	(Philippines) Sarina Bolden	Newcastle Jets	12
2	(Australia) Sophie Harding	Western Sydney Wanderers	12
2	(Australia) Rachel Lowe	Melbourne Victory	12
5	(United States) Hannah Keane	Western United	10
5	(Serbia) Vesna Milivojević	Canberra United	10
5	(Venezuela) Mariana Speckmaier	Wellington Phoenix	10
5	(Australia) Cortnee Vine	Sydney FC	10
9	(Australia) Chloe Logarzo	Western United	9
9	(New Zealand) Hannah Wilkinson	Melbourne City	9

=== Hat-tricks ===
Player	For	Against	Result	Date	Ref.
(Australia) Holly McNamara	Melbourne City	Western Sydney Wanderers	4–3 (H)	12 November 2023	
(England) Millie Farrow	Perth Glory	Melbourne City	1–3 (A)	9 December 2023	
(Serbia) Vesna Milivojević	Canberra United	Brisbane Roar	5–1 (H)	10 December 2023	
(Bosnia and Herzegovina) Emina Ekic	Melbourne City	Brisbane Roar	5–3 (H)	28 December 2023	
(Australia) Daniela Galic	Melbourne City	Adelaide United	0–5 (A)	6 January 2024	
(Philippines) Sarina Bolden	Newcastle Jets	Brisbane Roar	3–0 (H)	17 February 2024	
(United States) Hannah Keane	Western United	Canberra United	4–2 (H)	1 March 2024	
(Australia) Emily Gielnik	Melbourne Victory	Adelaide United	4–1 (H)	10 March 2024	

Key

- (H) Home team
- (A) Away team

== End-of-season awards ==
The following awards were announced during half-time of the 2024 A-League Women grand final that took place on 4 May 2024.

- Julie Dolan Medal – Sophie Harding (Western Sydney Wanderers)
- Young Footballer of the Year – Daniela Galic (Melbourne City)
- Golden Boot Award – Michelle Heyman (Canberra United) (17 goals)
- Goalkeeper of the Year – Morgan Aquino (Perth Glory)
- Coach of the Year – Emily Husband (Central Coast Mariners)
- Referee of the Year – Casey Reibelt
- Fair Play Award – Melbourne City
- Goal of the Year – Cassidy Davis (Newcastle Jets v Western Sydney Wanderers, 5 November 2023)
- Save of the Year – Brianna Edwards (Wellington Phoenix)
- Playmaker of the Year – Alyssa Whinham (Wellington Phoenix)
- Fan Player of the Year – Mariana Speckmaier (Wellington Phoenix)

=== Club awards ===
Club	Player of the Season	Ref.
Adelaide United	(Japan) Nanako Sasaki	
Brisbane Roar	(Australia) Sharn Freier	
Canberra United	(Australia) Michelle Heyman	
Central Coast Mariners	(Australia) Bianca Galic	
Melbourne City	(Australia) Laura Hughes	
Melbourne Victory	(United States) Kayla Morrison	
Newcastle Jets	(Philippines) Sarina Bolden	
Perth Glory	(Australia) Hana Lowry	
Sydney FC	(Australia) Charlotte McLean	
Wellington Phoenix	(New Zealand) Mackenzie Barry	
Western Sydney Wanderers	(Australia) Danika Matos	
Western United	(Australia) Chloe Logarzo	

== See also ==
- 2023–24 A-League Men
- A-League Women transfers for 2023–24 season
- 2023–24 Adelaide United FC (women) season
- 2023–24 Brisbane Roar FC (women) season
- 2023–24 Canberra United FC (women) season
- 2023–24 Central Coast Mariners FC (women) season
- 2023–24 Melbourne City FC (women) season
- 2023–24 Melbourne Victory FC (women) season
- 2023–24 Newcastle Jets FC (women) season
- 2023–24 Perth Glory FC (women) season
- 2023–24 Sydney FC (women) season
- 2023–24 Wellington Phoenix FC (women) season
- 2023–24 Western Sydney Wanderers FC (women) season
- 2023–24 Western United FC (women) season
