= Peta Trimis =

Australian soccer player

Personal information
- Date of birth: 18 May 2006 (age 20)
- Position: Forward

Team information
- Current team: Central Coast Mariners
- Number: 22

Youth career
- Sans Souci FC

Senior career*
Years	Team	Apps	(Gls)
2022	Football NSW Institute	3	(0)
2023	Bulls FC Academy	23	(10)
2023–	Central Coast Mariners	66	(9)

International career^{‡}
2021–2022	Australia U17	5	
2024–	Australia U20	17	(6)
- * Club domestic league appearances and goals as of 5 May 2026 ‡ National team caps and goals as of 14 April 2026

Peta Trimis (Greek: Πέτα Τρίμης, pronounced [ˈtri.mis] TREE-mis; born 18 May 2006) is an Australian professional soccer player who plays for A-League Women club Central Coast Mariners and the Australia under-20 national team.

== Early life ==
Trimis was born on 18 May 2006 in a Greek Australian family, and has two older sisters. She began playing soccer at the age of 10. Her passion for soccer helped her bond with her father, Petros, who supports Premier League club Liverpool.

Whilst living in Sylvania in Sydney's Southern Suburbs, Trimis attended Endeavour Sports High School (ESHS) in nearby Caringbah. She balanced her footballing career with her studies for the Higher School Certificate (HSC), which she completed upon graduating in 2024.

== Club career ==
=== Football NSW Institute ===
Trimis Started her career at Football NSW Institute in 2022.

=== Bulls FC Academy ===
In 2023, Trimis joined Bulls FC Academy in the National Premier Leagues NSW Women's (NPL NSW Women's), where she scored 10 goals in 23 appearances for the club.

=== Central Coast Mariners ===
On 5 August 2023, Central Coast Mariners (CCM) announced the signing of Trimis for the 2023–24 A-League Women season. She made her debut for the Mariners as a substitute in a 1–0 loss against rivals Newcastle Jets in the F3 Derby. She scored her first professional goal against Canberra United in a 3–0 win. On 20 January 2024, it was announced that she had been upgraded to a full senior contract. She finished the season with the Mariners playing 21 times and scoring three goals for the club.

On the 29 August 2024, the club announced that Trimis had signed a two-year contract extension until the end of the 2025–26 season. She scored her first goal of the 2024–25 season in a 5–1 F3 Derby win over rivals Newcastle Jets. Trimis was a part of the CCM side who won the 2025 A-League Women Grand Final against Melbourne Victory on penalties at AAMI Park. She finished the season with a goal and four assists in 27 matches.

On 2 November 2025, Trimis registered a goal and assist as Central Coast Mariners began their 2025–26 season, with a 3–0 victory over Adelaide United. On 27 December 2025, she scored from 32.9 metres (36 yards) out in a dramatic 3–3 draw at home with Melbourne Victory, with Victory sealing the draw with three stoppage time goals. The goal was awarded Goal of the Month before being named Goal of the Year at the end of the season. On 18 January 2026, she scored an Olimpico goal to equalise for the Mariners in a 1–1 draw at home with Perth Glory at Central Coast Stadium. She finished the season with five goals and four assists in 18 matches. At the end-of-season Dolan Warren Awards ceremony, she was nominated for Young Footballer of the Year (YFOTY) alongside winning Goal of the Year.

== International career ==
=== Youth ===
On 14 February 2024, It was announced that Trimis had been selected for the Australia under-20 national team squad for the 2024 AFC U-20 Women's Asian Cup in Uzbekistan.

On February 10, 2025, Football Australia announced Trimis as a part of the 26 player squad for the 2025 Pacific Women's Four Nations Tournament. On February 22, 2025, Trimis scored a hat trick for Australia against the Solomon Islands.

Trimis was selected by head coach Alex Epakis as part of Australia's 23-player squad for the 2026 AFC U-20 Women's Asian Cup in Thailand.

== Personal life ==
Trimis is of Greek descent. She is very proud of her Greek culture, enjoys Greek food and is a churchgoing Greek Orthodox Christian. She describes family as being very important to her and shares a close bond with her two older sisters.

Trimis has described Australian soccer player Mary Fowler, Brazilian footballer Neymar and her father Petros Trimis as role models, and former Central Coast Mariners coach Emily Husband and her first coach at Sans Souci FC as mentors. She dreams of playing for Women's Super League (WSL) Liverpool and enjoying a playing career in Europe, specifically mentioning a desire to play in England, Greece and Spain.
