= 2021–22 A-League Women =

Fourteenth edition of the top Australian women's football (soccer) league

A-League Women
- Season: 2021–22
- Dates: 3 December 2021 – 10 March 2022 (regular season); 11–27 March 2022 (finals)
- Champions: Melbourne Victory (3rd title)
- Premiers: Sydney FC (4th title)
- Matches: 74
- Goals: 248 (3.35 per match)
- Top goalscorer: Fiona Worts (regular season, 13 goals); Hannah Wilkinson (overall, 14 goals)
- Biggest home win: 6 goals Sydney FC 6–0 Canberra United (15 January 2022)
- Biggest away win: 6 goals Brisbane Roar 2–8 Adelaide United (13 February 2022)
- Highest scoring: 10 goals Brisbane Roar 2–8 Adelaide United (13 February 2022)
- Longest winning run: 6 matches Sydney FC
- Longest unbeaten run: 11 matches Sydney FC
- Longest winless run: 10 matches Wellington Phoenix
- Longest losing run: 9 matches Wellington Phoenix
- Attendance: 88,629 (1,198 per match)
- (Note: Longest runs only include regular season results)

The 2021–22 A-League Women, known as the Liberty A-League for sponsorship reasons, was the fourteenth season of the A-League Women, the Australian national women's association football competition originally known as the W-League until the previous season. Wellington Phoenix were announced as an expansion club, taking the total teams to 10.

Sydney FC were the defending premiers, having won their third premiership title in 2020–21. Melbourne Victory were the defending champions, having won their second championship title in 2020–21. Both clubs successfully defended their respective titles.

== Clubs ==
=== Stadiums and locations ===
Team	Location	Stadium	Capacity
Adelaide United	Adelaide	Marden Sports Complex; Coopers Stadium	6,000; 16,500
Brisbane Roar	Brisbane	Suncorp Stadium; Lions Stadium; Moreton Daily Stadium	52,500; 5,000; 11,500
Canberra United	Canberra	Viking Park	7,000
Melbourne City	Melbourne	Frank Holohan Soccer Complex	2,000
Melbourne Victory	Melbourne	AAMI Park	30,050
Newcastle Jets	Newcastle	Newcastle Number 2 Sports Ground; McDonald Jones Stadium	5,000; 33,000
Perth Glory	Perth	Macedonia Park	7,000
Sydney FC	Sydney	Jubilee Oval; Leichhardt Oval	20,505; 20,000
Wellington Phoenix	Wellington; Wollongong	Sky Stadium; WIN Stadium	34,500; 23,000
Western Sydney Wanderers	Sydney	Marconi Stadium; CommBank Stadium; Wanderers Football Park	9,000; 30,000; 1,000

=== Personnel and kits ===
Team	Manager	Captain	Kit manufacturers	Kit sponsors
Adelaide United	(Australia) Adrian Stenta	(Australia) Isabel Hodgson	UCAN	SA Power Networks
Brisbane Roar	(Australia) Garrath McPherson	(Australia) Ayesha Norrie	New Balance	Ausenco
Canberra United	(Australia) Vicki Linton	(Australia) Michelle Heyman	ISC Sport	Club Lime; University of Canberra
Melbourne City	(Australia) Rado Vidošić	(Australia) Emma Checker	Puma	Etihad Airways
Melbourne Victory	(Wales) Jeff Hopkins	(United States) Kayla Morrison (Australia) Lia Privitelli (Note: Privitelli replaced Morrison as captain, after she was injured in the first match of the season.)	Macron	MATE
Newcastle Jets	(Australia) Ash Wilson	(Australia) Cassidy Davis (Australia) Gema Simon	VIVA	Port of Newcastle
Perth Glory	(Australia) Alexander Epakis	(Australia) Natasha Rigby	Macron	BHP
Sydney FC	(Australia) Ante Juric	(Australia) Natalie Tobin	Under Armour	The Star
Wellington Phoenix	(Wales) Gemma Lewis	(New Zealand) Lily Alfeld	Paladin Sports	NZCIS
Western Sydney Wanderers	(Australia) Catherine Cannuli	(Australia) Erica Halloway	Kappa	Intermain

Alternate kit.

=== Managerial changes ===
Team	Outgoing manager	Manner of departure	Date of vacancy	Position on table	Incoming manager	Date of appointment
Western Sydney Wanderers	(Australia) Dean Heffernan	Resigned	2 June 2021	Pre-season	(Australia) Catherine Cannuli	2 June 2021
Brisbane Roar	(Australia) Jake Goodship	Resigned	10 July 2021	Pre-season	(Australia) Garrath McPherson	17 August 2021
Wellington Phoenix	Inaugural manager			Pre-season	(Wales) Gemma Lewis	11 October 2021

=== Foreign players ===
Club	Visa 1	Visa 2	Visa 3	Visa 4	Non-Visa foreigner(s)	Former player(s)
Adelaide United	(England) Fiona Worts	(Japan) Reona Omiya	(Japan) Nanako Sasaki	(United States) Kayla Sharples		
Brisbane Roar	(Brazil) Mariel Hecher	(Japan) Rie Kitano	(United States) Cannon Clough	(United States) Shea Connors		
Canberra United	(France) Margot Robinne	(Canada) Ally Haran	(United States) Chelsee Washington			
Melbourne City	(New Zealand) Marisa van der Meer	(New Zealand) Hannah Wilkinson			(New Zealand) Rebekah Stott^{A} (Serbia) Tyla-Jay Vlajnic^{A}	
Melbourne Victory	(New Zealand) Claudia Bunge	(United States) Kayla Morrison	(United States) Catherine Zimmerman		(United States) Brooke Hendrix^{R}	(United States) Lynn Williams^{G}
Newcastle Jets	(Norway) Marie Dølvik Markussen	(United States) Elizabeth Eddy				
Perth Glory	(Denmark) Mie Leth Jans	(England) Gemma Craine	(New Zealand) Elizabeth Anton	(United States) Cyera Hintzen		
Sydney FC	(Chile) María José Rojas	(New Zealand) Paige Satchell				
Wellington Phoenix						
Western Sydney Wanderers	(Canada) Isabella Habuda	(New Zealand) Malia Steinmetz				

The following do not fill a Visa position:
^{A} Australian citizens who have chosen to represent another national team
^{G} Guest Players
^{R} Injury Replacement Players, or National Team Replacement Players

== Regular season ==
=== League table ===
Pos	Team	Pld	W	D	L	GF	GA	GD	Pts	Qualification
1	Sydney FC	14	11	2	1	36	6	+30	35	Qualification to Finals series
2	Melbourne City	14	11	0	3	29	11	+18	33	Qualification to Finals series
3	Adelaide United	14	9	0	5	33	18	+15	27	Qualification to Finals series
4	Melbourne Victory (C)	14	7	3	4	26	22	+4	24	Qualification to Finals series
5	Perth Glory	14	7	3	4	20	23	−3	24	
6	Brisbane Roar	14	5	2	7	29	30	−1	17	
7	Canberra United	14	2	7	5	24	29	−5	13	
8	Newcastle Jets	14	2	4	8	15	30	−15	10	
9	Western Sydney Wanderers	14	1	4	9	7	27	−20	7	
10	Wellington Phoenix	14	2	1	11	13	36	−23	7	

Source: A-Leagues
Rules for classification: 1) points; 2) goal difference; 3) number of goals scored.
(C) Champions

=== Fixtures and results ===
Home \ Away	ADE	BRI	CAN	MCY	MVC	NEW	PER	SYD	WEL	WSW
Adelaide United			2–1	0–1	3–0	3–0	4–2	0–1	1–0	
Brisbane Roar	2–8		3–3	1–2	2–3	4–0	0–1			0–1
Canberra United	1–3	3–3		0–1	2–2	3–0	3–3		0–3	
Melbourne City	3–1	0–1			1–2	2–0		2–1	4–0	2–1
Melbourne Victory	5–1	2–4	0–0	1–5			0–2	2–2		5–0
Newcastle Jets		1–5	3–3		0–1		1–1	0–1	5–1	2–2
Perth Glory	1–0	2–1	0–0	0–4				1–3	3–2	1–0
Sydney FC		2–0	6–0	3–0		3–1	4–0		3–0	0–0
Wellington Phoenix	1–4	2–3			0–2	0–1	1–3	0–5		0–0
Western Sydney Wanderers	0–3		0–5	0–2	0–1	1–1		0–2	2–3	

Source: A-League Women
Legend: Blue = home team win; Yellow = draw; Red = away team win.

=== Matches ===
- All times were in AEDT (UTC+11:00)

=== Round 1 ===
3 December 2021	Wellington Phoenix	0–0	Western Sydney Wanderers	Wollongong
17:05		Report		Stadium: WIN Stadium; Attendance: 1,309; Referee: Casey Reibelt

3 December 2021	Canberra United	0–1	Melbourne City	Canberra
19:45		Report	McNamara 80'	Stadium: Viking Park; Attendance: 1,237; Referee: Georgia Ghirardello

4 December 2021	Sydney FC	3–1	Newcastle Jets	Sydney
17:05	Siemsen 52'; Ibini 58'; Vine 69'	Report	Allan 67'	Stadium: Netstrata Jubilee Stadium; Attendance: 1,997; Referee: Rebecca Mackie

4 December 2021	Perth Glory	2–1	Brisbane Roar	Perth
22:05	Phonsongkham 88'; Worth 90' (o.g.)	Report	Margraf 22'	Stadium: Macedonia Park; Attendance: 830; Referee: Rebecca Durcau

5 December 2021	Melbourne Victory	5–1	Adelaide United	Melbourne
16:05	Privitelli 10', 69'; Morrison 19'; Bunge 23'; Zimmerman 39'	Report	Worts 65'	Stadium: AAMI Park; Attendance: 3,450; Referee: Isabella Blaess

=== Round 2 ===
10 December 2021	Newcastle Jets	5–1	Wellington Phoenix	Newcastle
17:05	Fenton 33'; Markussen 55'; Andrews 61', 62'; Harding 73'	Report	Pritchard 81'	Stadium: McDonald Jones Stadium; Attendance: 2,273; Referee: Isabella Blaess

10 December 2021	Brisbane Roar	0–1	Perth Glory	Brisbane
19:45		Report	Jancevski 86'	Stadium: Perry Park; Attendance: 2,239; Referee: Rachael Mitchenson

11 December 2021	Western Sydney Wanderers	0–2	Sydney FC	Parramatta
17:05		Report	Siemsen 18', 48'	Stadium: CommBank Stadium; Attendance: 1,992; Referee: Lara Lee

12 December 2021	Melbourne City	1–2	Melbourne Victory	Melbourne
16:05	Jackson 45+4' (o.g.)	Report	Zimmerman 65'; Williams 70'	Stadium: AAMI Park; Attendance: 1,092; Referee: Casey Reibelt

12 December 2021	Adelaide United	2–1	Canberra United	Adelaide
18:05	Sasaki 23'; Condon 90+1'	Report	Heyman 16'	Stadium: Marden Sports Complex; Attendance: 780; Referee: Rebecca Mackie

=== Round 3 ===
17 December 2021	Western Sydney Wanderers	1–1	Newcastle Jets	Sydney
17:05	Crofts 90'	Report	Jaber 21'	Stadium: Blacktown Football Park; Attendance: 496; Referee: Casey Reibelt

18 December 2021	Brisbane Roar	2–3	Melbourne Victory	Brisbane
17:05	Connors 65'; Crummer 90+4'	Report	Williams 36'; Withers 46'; Zimmerman 85'	Stadium: Moreton Daily Stadium; Attendance: 1,258; Referee: Lara Lee

18 December 2021	Melbourne City	3–1	Adelaide United	Melbourne
17:05	Pollicina 38'; Wilkinson 40', 90+4'	Report	Dawber 65'	Stadium: AAMI Park; Attendance: 7,896; Referee: Rachel Mitchenson

19 December 2021	Sydney FC	3–0	Wellington Phoenix	Sydney
16:05	Vine 24'; Rule 53'; Hawkesby 66'	Report		Stadium: Netstrata Jubilee Stadium; Attendance: 1,045; Referee: Georgia Ghirardello

5 January 2022	Perth Glory	0–0	Canberra United	Sydney
17:05		Report		Stadium: Blacktown Football Park; Attendance: 106; Referee: Georgia Ghirardello

=== Round 4 ===
23 December 2021	Canberra United	3–3	Brisbane Roar	Canberra
19:45	Heyman 10'; Maher 87'; Caspers 90+3'	Report	Roestbakken 23' (o.g.); Connors 38'; Margraf 64'	Stadium: Viking Park; Attendance: 957; Referee: Rachael Mitchenson

26 December 2021	Melbourne Victory	1–5	Melbourne City	Melbourne
17:05	Markovski 84'	Report	Wilkinson 5', 13', 26', 56', 75'	Stadium: AAMI Park; Attendance: 4,682; Referee: Lara Lee

27 December 2021	Sydney FC	0–0	Western Sydney Wanderers	Sydney
16:05		Report		Stadium: Leichhardt Oval; Attendance: 1,058; Referee: Isabella Blaess

27 December 2021	Wellington Phoenix	0–1	Newcastle Jets	Gosford
18:45		Report	House 82'	Stadium: Central Coast Stadium; Attendance: 0 (behind closed doors); Referee: Georgia Ghirardello

1 January 2022	Adelaide United	4–2	Perth Glory	Adelaide
17:05	Dawber 33', 45+2'; McNamara 77'; Condon 81'	Report	Hintzen 41'; Jancevski 53' (pen.)	Stadium: Coopers Stadium; Attendance: 1,660; Referee: Rebecca Mackie

=== Round 5 ===
30 December 2021	Wellington Phoenix	0–5	Sydney FC	Wollongong
17:05		Report	Lowe 4'; Hawkesby 14' (pen.), 29', 44'; Vine 38'	Stadium: WIN Stadium; Attendance: 309; Referee: Lara Lee

2 January 2022	Melbourne Victory	2–4	Brisbane Roar	Melbourne
16:05	Rasschaert 6' (o.g.); Williams 26'	Report	Crummer 59'; Gorry 86'; Connors 90'; Norrie 90+6'	Stadium: AAMI Park; Attendance: 605; Referee: Isabella Blaess

10 February 2022	Perth Glory	1–0	Adelaide United	Gosford
17:05	Leth Jans 6'	Report		Stadium: Central Coast Stadium; Attendance: 308; Referee: Georgia Ghirardello

15 February 2022	Western Sydney Wanderers	0–5	Canberra United	Sydney
17:25		Report	Heyman 22'; Washington 34'; Middleton 66'; Robinne 85', 90'	Stadium: Blacktown Football Park; Attendance: 381; Referee: Caitlin Williams

1 March 2022	Melbourne City	2–0	Newcastle Jets	Broadmeadows
19:05	Torpey 16'; Wilkinson 49'	Report		Stadium: ABD Stadium; Attendance: 357; Referee: Caitlin Williams

=== Round 6 ===
8 January 2022	Canberra United	1–3	Adelaide United	Canberra
17:05	Sykes 57'	Report	Holmes 9'; Dawber 40'; Worts 77'	Stadium: Viking Park; Attendance: 910; Referee: Kate Jacewicz

8 January 2022	Sydney FC	4–0	Perth Glory	Sydney
19:45	Hawkesby 11'; Vine 17'; Siemsen 25'; Rule 49'	Report		Stadium: Netstrata Jubilee Stadium; Attendance: 350; Referee: Casey Reibelt

9 January 2022	Melbourne City	4–0	Wellington Phoenix	Melbourne
16:05	Torpey 29'; Wilkinson 43'; Heatley 45+3'; Checker 78'	Report		Stadium: AAMI Park; Attendance: 1,021; Referee: Caitlin Williams

9 January 2022	Brisbane Roar	0–1	Western Sydney Wanderers	Brisbane
16:05		Report	Henry 65' (pen.)	Stadium: Moreton Daily Stadium; Attendance: 450; Referee: Lara Lee

8 February 2022	Newcastle Jets	0–1	Melbourne Victory	Newcastle
17:25		Report	Hendrix 55'	Stadium: McDonald Jones Stadium; Attendance: 1,135; Referee: Kelly Jones

=== Round 7 ===
15 January 2022	Adelaide United	0–1	Melbourne City	Adelaide
17:05		Report	Pollicina 66'	Stadium: Coopers Stadium; Attendance: 2,062; Referee: Georgia Ghirardello

15 January 2022	Sydney FC	6–0	Canberra United	Sydney
17:05	Rojas 28' (pen.), 41', 64'; Green 62'; Ibini 83'; Lowe 88'	Report		Stadium: Netstrata Jubilee Stadium; Attendance: 1,319; Referee: Isabella Blaess

16 January 2022	Wellington Phoenix	2–3	Brisbane Roar	Wollongong
14:05	Whinham 19'; Jale 24'	Report	Hecher 34'; Crummer 46'; Gorry 87' (pen.)	Stadium: WIN Stadium; Attendance: 247; Referee: Rebecca Mackie

16 January 2022	Western Sydney Wanderers	0–1	Melbourne Victory	Parramatta
16:05		Report	Markovski 74' (pen.)	Stadium: CommBank Stadium; Attendance: 458; Referee: Rachael Mitchenson

16 January 2022	Newcastle Jets	1–1	Perth Glory	Newcastle
18:45	Eddy 77'	Report	Lowry 54'	Stadium: No. 2 Sportsground; Attendance: 713; Referee: Caitlin Williams

=== Round 8 ===
21 January 2022	Adelaide United	1–0	Wellington Phoenix	Adelaide
18:05	Hayward 68'	Report		Stadium: Coopers Stadium; Attendance: 1,024; Referee: Caitlin Williams

23 January 2022	Perth Glory	1–0	Western Sydney Wanderers	Gosford
18:45	De la Harpe 49'	Report		Stadium: Central Coast Stadium; Attendance: 493; Referee: Rebecca Mackie

20 February 2022	Melbourne City	2–1	Sydney FC	Melbourne
16:05	Pollicina 13'; McNamara 45+1'	Report	Ibini 79' (pen.)	Stadium: Kingston Heath Soccer Complex; Attendance: 1,019; Referee: Casey Reibelt

22 February 2022	Canberra United	2–2	Melbourne Victory	Canberra
17:25	Washington 41'; Heyman 45+3'	Report	Chidiac 81'; Eliadis 90+1'	Stadium: Viking Park; Attendance: 1,089; Referee: Rachael Mitchenson

7 March 2022	Brisbane Roar	4–0	Newcastle Jets	Brisbane
16:15	Gorry 4'; Crummer 13'; Coelho 29' (o.g.); Connors 38'	Report		Stadium: James Drysdale Reserve 1 Attendance: 1,000; Referee: Caitlin Williams

=== Round 9 ===
28 January 2022	Western Sydney Wanderers	0–3	Adelaide United	Sydney
19:45		Report	Sharples 5'; Dawber 55', 87'	Stadium: Marconi Stadium; Attendance: 515; Referee: Isabella Blaess

29 January 2022	Brisbane Roar	1–2	Melbourne City	Brisbane
16:05	Gorry 71' (pen.)	Report	Pollicina 79'; Wilkinson 90+4'	Stadium: Moreton Daily Stadium; Attendance: 1,132; Referee: Rebecca Mackie

30 January 2022	Newcastle Jets	3–3	Canberra United	Newcastle
16:05	Markussen 1'; Harding 51'; Franco 63'	Report	Sykes 18', 60'; Toby 62'	Stadium: McDonald Jones Stadium; Attendance: 2,546; Referee: Georgia Ghirardello

31 January 2022	Perth Glory	3–2	Wellington Phoenix	Sydney
18:35	Sakalis 14'; Hintzen 81'; Leth Jans 88'	Report	Jale 20'; Knott 39'	Stadium: Blacktown Football Park; Attendance: 84; Referee: Rachael Mitchenson

16 February 2022	Melbourne Victory	2–2	Sydney FC	Melbourne
20:05	Privitelli 68'; Zimmerman 90+2'	Report	Siemsen 50'; Ibini 60'	Stadium: City Vista Recreation Reserve; Attendance: 814; Referee: Rachael Mitchenson

=== Round 10 ===
2 February 2022	Sydney FC	2–0	Brisbane Roar	Sydney
19:45	Rojas 5'; Rule 49'	Report		Stadium: Leichhardt Oval; Attendance: 501; Referee: Georgia Ghirardello

4 February 2022	Adelaide United	3–0	Newcastle Jets	Adelaide
16:05	Worts 24', 76'; Dawber 80' (pen.)	Report		Stadium: Coopers Stadium; Attendance: 2,032; Referee: Rebecca Mackie

4 February 2022	Wellington Phoenix	0–2	Melbourne Victory	Wollongong
16:05		Report	Alfeld 13' (o.g.); Eliadis 23'	Stadium: WIN Stadium; Attendance: 61; Referee: Caitlin Williams

5 February 2022	Canberra United	3–3	Perth Glory	Canberra
17:05	Maher 6' (pen.); Washington 79'; Keir 84'	Report	Hintzen 44', 70'; Anton 64'	Stadium: Viking Park; Attendance: 1,125; Referee: Isabella Blaess

6 February 2022	Melbourne City	2–1	Western Sydney Wanderers	Melbourne
16:05	Pollicina 28'; McNamara 45'	Report	Collister 45+2'	Stadium: AAMI Park; Attendance: 840; Referee: Rachael Mitchenson

=== Round 11 ===
11 February 2022	Canberra United	0–3	Wellington Phoenix	Canberra
19:45		Report	Knott 41'; Jale 50'; Haran 62' (o.g.)	Stadium: Viking Park; Attendance: 957; Referee: Rebecca Mackie

12 February 2022	Melbourne Victory	5–0	Western Sydney Wanderers	Melbourne
16:50	Zimmerman 5', 60'; Barbieri 32'; Cooney-Cross 58'; Nevin 63'	Report		Stadium: AAMI Park; Attendance: 1,691; Referee: Kelly Jones

13 February 2022	Perth Glory	0–4	Melbourne City	Gosford
15:05		Report	Pollicina 48'; McNamara 61', 88'; Wilkinson 90+4'	Stadium: Central Coast Stadium; Attendance: 362; Referee: Lara Lee

13 February 2022	Brisbane Roar	2–8	Adelaide United	Brisbane
16:05	Connors 59', 80'	Report	Dawber 13'; Palmer 23' (o.g.); Worts 33', 43', 57', 64', 74'; McNamara 55'	Stadium: Moreton Daily Stadium; Attendance: 1,000; Referee: Rachael Mitchenson

13 February 2022	Newcastle Jets	0–1	Sydney FC	Newcastle
18:15		Report	Ibini 22'	Stadium: No. 2 Sportsground; Attendance: 573; Referee: Georgia Ghirardello

=== Round 12 ===
22 January 2022	Sydney FC	3–0	Melbourne City	Sydney
13:05	Satchell 33'; Lowe 44', 74'	Report		Stadium: Netstrata Jubilee Stadium; Attendance: 1,259; Referee: Rachael Mitchenson

18 February 2022 (Note: Game was originally meant to be played on 17 February but was postponed first due to hail and then lighting.)	Wellington Phoenix	1–4	Adelaide United	Wollongong
16:05	Jale 25'	Report	Dawber 5', 59'; McMeeken 34' (o.g.); Worts 55'	Stadium: WIN Stadium; Attendance: 0 (behind closed doors); Referee: Kelly Jones

19 February 2022	Melbourne Victory	0–2	Perth Glory	Melbourne
17:05		Report	Zimmerman 69' (o.g.); Khamis 73'	Stadium: AAMI Park; Attendance: 1,243; Referee: Rebecca Mackie

19 February 2022	Newcastle Jets	2–2	Western Sydney Wanderers	Newcastle
17:05	Eddy 59' (pen.); Brodigan 90+2'	Report	Crofts 40'; Apostolakis 76'	Stadium: No. 2 Sportsground; Attendance: 1,014; Referee: Lara Lee

10 March 2022	Brisbane Roar	3–3	Canberra United	Brisbane
18:05	Crummer 13'; Norrie 64'; McElligott 90'	Report	Heyman 67', 72', 88'	Stadium: James Drysdale Reserve 1 Attendance: 875; Referee: Rebecca Mackie

=== Round 13 ===
24 February 2022	Melbourne City	0–1	Brisbane Roar	Melbourne
19:45		Report	Hecher 26'	Stadium: Kingston Heath Soccer Complex; Attendance: 857; Referee: Kelly Jones

25 February 2022	Canberra United	3–0	Newcastle Jets	Canberra
17:25	Toby 11'; Heyman 29', 45+1'	Report		Stadium: Viking Park; Attendance: 753; Referee: Georgia Ghirardello

26 February 2022	Adelaide United	3–0	Melbourne Victory	Adelaide
17:20	Worts 18', 25', 46'	Report		Stadium: Coopers Stadium; Attendance: 2,421; Referee: Lara Lee

27 February 2022	Perth Glory	1–3	Sydney FC	Launceston
16:05	Keane 86'	Report	Tobin 34'; Vine 52', 60'	Stadium: University of Tasmania Stadium; Attendance: 692; Referee: Rebecca Mackie

1 March 2022	Western Sydney Wanderers	2–3	Wellington Phoenix	Sydney
18:35	Crofts 2'; Copus-Brown 90+5'	Report	Taylor 37'; Pritchard 74'; Jale 90+3'	Stadium: Blacktown Football Park; Attendance: 154; Referee: Kelly Jones

=== Round 14 ===
4 March 2022	Melbourne Victory	0–0	Canberra United	Melbourne
17:05		Report		Stadium: AAMI Park; Attendance: 1,091; Referee: Rebecca Mackie

4 March 2022	Wellington Phoenix	1–3	Perth Glory	Wollongong
17:05	Jale 86' (pen.)	Report	Gomez 23' (o.g.); Hintzen 61'; Keane 63'	Stadium: WIN Stadium; Referee: Rachael Mitchenson

4 March 2022	Newcastle Jets	1–5	Brisbane Roar	Newcastle
19:45	Allan 63'	Report	Margraf 17'; Crummer 29', 55', 57'; Palmer 71'	Stadium: No. 2 Sportsground; Attendance: 1,156; Referee: Kelly Jones

6 March 2022	Western Sydney Wanderers	0–2	Melbourne City	Sydney
12:02		Report	Pollicina 21'; Wilkinson 73'	Stadium: Blacktown Football Park; Attendance: 220; Referee: Georgia Ghirardello

6 March 2022	Adelaide United	0–1	Sydney FC	Adelaide
15:35		Report	Satchell 61'	Stadium: Coopers Stadium; Attendance: 1,173; Referee: Casey Reibelt

== Regular season statistics ==
=== Top scorers ===
Rank	Player	Club	Goals
1	(England) Fiona Worts	Adelaide United	13
2	(New Zealand) Hannah Wilkinson	Melbourne City	12
3	(Australia) Chelsie Dawber	Adelaide United	10
4	(Australia) Michelle Heyman	Canberra United	9
5	(Australia) Larissa Crummer	Brisbane Roar	8
6	(United States) Shea Connors	Brisbane Roar	7
6	(Australia) Rhianna Pollicina	Melbourne City	7
8	(New Zealand) Grace Jale	Wellington Phoenix	6
8	(Australia) Cortnee Vine	Sydney FC	6
8	(United States) Catherine Zimmerman	Melbourne Victory	6

=== Hat-tricks ===
Player	For	Against	Result	Date	Ref.
(New Zealand) Hannah Wilkinson ^{5}	Melbourne City	Melbourne Victory	5–1 (A)	26 December 2021	
(Australia) Mackenzie Hawkesby	Sydney FC	Wellington Phoenix	5–0 (A)	30 December 2021	
(Chile) María José Rojas	Sydney FC	Canberra United	6–0 (H)	15 January 2022	
(England) Fiona Worts ^{5}	Adelaide United	Brisbane Roar	8–2 (A)	13 February 2022	
(England) Fiona Worts	Adelaide United	Melbourne Victory	3–0 (H)	26 February 2022	
(Australia) Larissa Crummer	Brisbane Roar	Newcastle Jets	5–1 (A)	4 March 2022	
(Australia) Michelle Heyman	Canberra United	Brisbane Roar	3–3 (A)	10 March 2022	

Key
^{5}	Player scored five goals
(A)	Away team
(H)	Home team

=== Clean sheets ===
Rank	Player	Club	Clean sheets
1	(Australia) Jada Whyman	Sydney FC	10
2	(Australia) Melissa Barbieri	Melbourne City	6
3	(Australia) Casey Dumont	Melbourne Victory	5
4	(Australia) Morgan Aquino	Perth Glory	4
4	(Australia) Annalee Grove	Adelaide United	4
6	(Australia) Chloe Lincoln	Canberra United	3
6	(Australia) Sarah Willacy	Western Sydney Wanderers	3
8	(New Zealand) Lily Alfeld	Wellington Phoenix	2
8	(Australia) Courtney Newbon	Perth Glory	2
8	(Australia) Isabella Shuttleworth	Brisbane Roar	2

== Finals series ==
=== Bracket ===
Semi-finals
1	Sydney FC (a.e.t.)	4
2	Melbourne City	2
3	Adelaide United	1
4	Melbourne Victory	2

Preliminary Final
2	Melbourne City	1
4	Melbourne Victory	3

Grand Final
1	Sydney FC	1
4	Melbourne Victory	2

=== Semi-finals ===
11 March 2022	Sydney FC	4–2 (a.e.t.)	Melbourne City	Sydney
19:05	Vine 73', 113'; Rojas 91'; Hunter 97'	Report	Wilkinson 21', 108'	Stadium: Netstrata Jubilee Stadium; Attendance: 942; Referee: Georgia Ghirardello

13 March 2022	Adelaide United	1–2	Melbourne Victory	Adelaide
16:05	Sasaki 32'	Report	Privitelli 29'; Ayres 57'	Stadium: Coopers Stadium; Attendance: 2,607; Referee: Lara Lee

=== Preliminary Final ===
20 March 2022	Melbourne City	1–3	Melbourne Victory	Melbourne
16:05	Tumeth 80'	Report	Ayres 30'; Bunge 45+2'; Privitelli 53'	Stadium: AAMI Park; Attendance: 1,306; Referee: Casey Reibelt

=== Grand Final ===
27 March 2022	Sydney FC	1–2	Melbourne Victory	Sydney
15:05	Vine 66'	Report	Jackson 49'; Zimmerman 64'	Stadium: Netstrata Jubilee Stadium; Attendance: 5,027; Referee: Lara Lee

== End-of-season awards ==
The following awards were announced at the 2021–22 Dolan Warren Awards night on 26 May 2022.

- Julie Dolan Medal – Fiona Worts (Adelaide United)
- Young Player of the Year – Holly McNamara (Melbourne City)
- Golden Boot Award – Fiona Worts (Adelaide United) (13 goals)
- Goalkeeper of the Year – Casey Dumont (Melbourne Victory)
- Coach of the Year – Adrian Stenta (Adelaide United)
- Referee of the Year – Lara Lee
- Goal of the Year – Rachel Lowe (Sydney FC v Wellington Phoenix, 30 December 2021)

=== Club awards ===
Club	Player of the Season	Ref.
Adelaide United	(England) Fiona Worts	
Brisbane Roar	(Australia) Ayesha Norrie	
Canberra United	(United States) Ally Haran	
Melbourne City	(Australia) Holly McNamara (New Zealand) Hannah Wilkinson	
Melbourne Victory	(Australia) Alex Chidiac	
Newcastle Jets	(Australia) Cassidy Davis	
Perth Glory	(Denmark) Mie Leth Jans	
Sydney FC	(Australia) Mackenzie Hawkesby	
Wellington Phoenix	(New Zealand) Kate Taylor	
Western Sydney Wanderers	(Australia) Clare Hunt	

== See also ==
- 2021–22 A-League Men
- A-League Women transfers for 2021–22 season
- 2021–22 Canberra United FC (women) season
- 2021–22 Newcastle Jets FC (women) season
- 2021–22 Sydney FC (women) season
- 2021–22 Wellington Phoenix FC (women) season
