= Melissa Andreatta =

Australian soccer coach

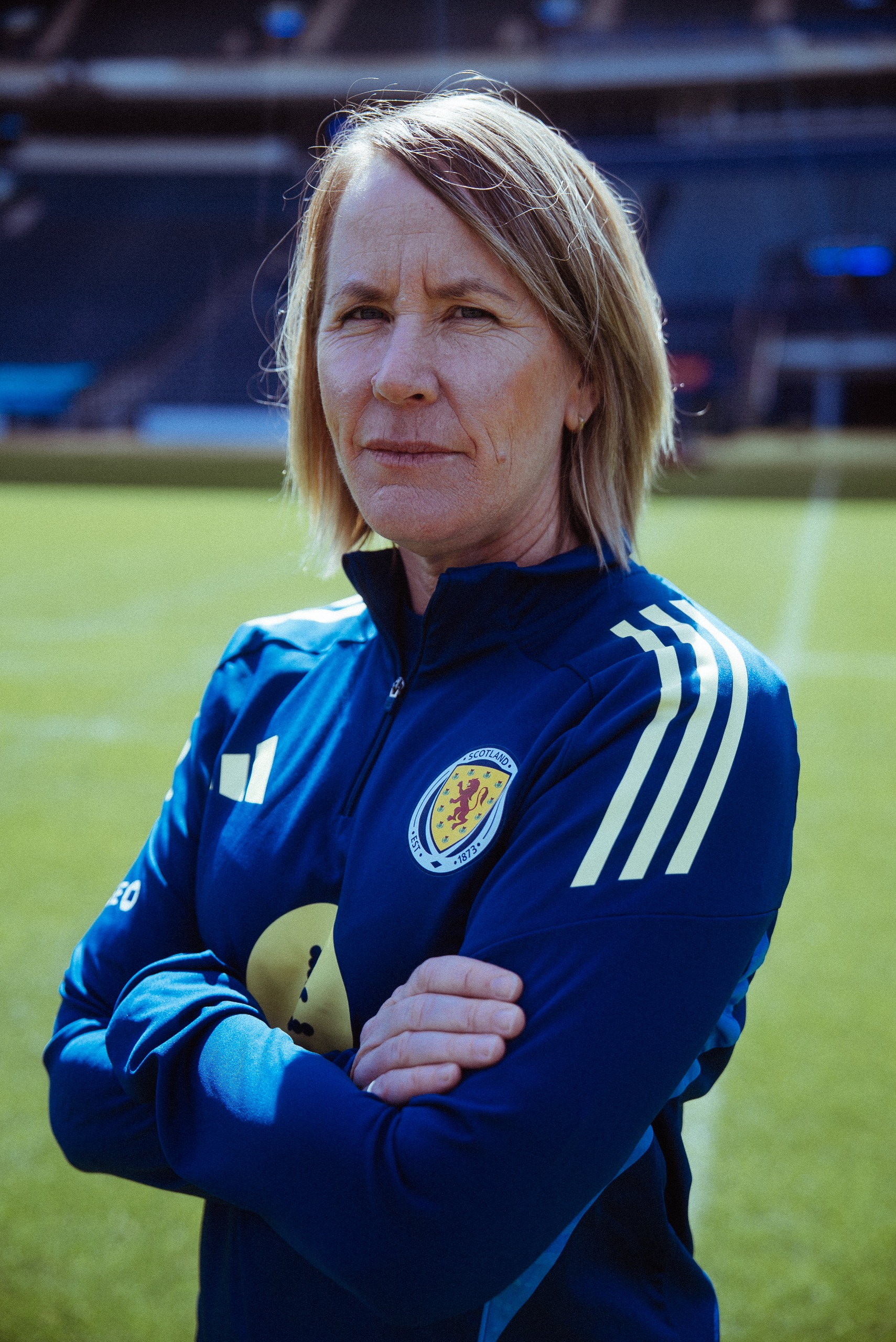

Personal information
- Full name: Melissa Jane Andreatta
- Place of birth: Brisbane, Australia
- Position: Midfielder

Team information
- Current team: Scotland (Head coach)

Youth career
- Taringa Rovers
- The Gap

Senior career*
Years	Team	Apps	(Gls)
1999–2008	The Gap		
2003–2004	NNSW Pride		

Managerial career
- 2007–2008: The Gap (women)
- 2011–2016: Brisbane Roar (assistant)
- 2011: Football QLD National Training Centre (women)
- 2013–2014: Australia U-17 (assistant)
- 2016–2018: Brisbane Roar
- 2018–2025: Australia (assistant)
- 2019–2020: Brisbane Strikers (U-16 & U-18 Boys)
- 2022–2025: Australia U-23
- 2025–: Scotland
- * Club domestic league appearances and goals

Melissa Jane Andreatta is an Australian soccer coach who currently works as head coach for Scotland women's national football team.

== Playing career ==
Andreatta was born in Brisbane, Australia to mother, Charmaine, who was a teacher aide, her Italian father, Mario and her two brothers Jason and Tim. She started playing football in high school at Brigidine College at outdoor football before joining Brisbane-based Taringa Rovers after graduation. After she injured her ACL in the first 12 months, Andreatta went on to play for The Gap. In 2003, Andreatta was named in the Northern NSW Pride Squad for the 2003/04 Women's National Soccer League season. She made her national league debut against Adelaide Sensation on 26 October.

== Coaching career ==
After completing her teaching qualifications at 21 years old, Andreatta returned to The Gap as Head coach of the Women's Team winning the State League Championship in 2007 and 2008. In 2011, Andreatta joined Brisbane Roar as Assistant Coach to Jeff Hopkins. While she at Brisbane Roar, Andreatta moved into Football Australia's Technical Department when she was named to the Technical Staff of the Junior Matildas (U-17) as Assistant Coach. During this period she also served as the National Training Centre and Football Queensland Girls State Team coach.

In 2016 joined The Matildas Technical Staff as a Technical Analyst scouting for the team in the lead up to and during the Rio 2016.

After four years as an assistant, Andreatta was appointed the third Head Coach of Brisbane Roar in 2016 when she took over from Belinda Wilson. After a re-building season in 2016/17, Andreatta guided the Roar to their third W-League Premiership in 2018 as they finished the regular season on top of the ladder. She was only the third female coach in the competition's history to lead a team to the Premier's Plate. During those two seasons, Andreatta coached national team players including highest capped Matilda Clare Polkinghorne, goalkeeper Mackenzie Arnold, winger Hayley Raso, midfielder Tameka Yallop, forward Emily Gielnik and midfielder Katrina Gorry. For an outstanding season, Melissa Andreatta voted the W-League Coach of the Year becoming only the second female coach to earn the honour. In the 2018–19 Andreatta led the Roar to another top two regular season finish as they pushed eventual Premiership winners Melbourne Victory all the way. In recognition of her leadership, she was named the rebel Female Football Week Female Coach of the Year.

2019 saw Andreatta promoted in the national team set up as she was transitioned to the Assistant Coach role under the newly appointed Ante Milicic at The Matildas. Her Assistant Coach role saw her alongside Milicic for Australia's 2019 campaign in France where The Matildas made the knockout phase before falling to Norway in the Round of 16.

After three successful seasons at Brisbane Roar, prior to the 2019/2020 season Andreatta stepped down from her Head Coach role at the Roar and joined the Brisbane Strikers as the 16 & U18 Boys Head Coach in the Queensland.

While serving as a part of the coaching staff of the Matildas, Andreatta assisted the team in qualifying for the 2020 and their second straight Women's Olympic Football Tournament.

Following the declaration of the COVID-19 Global pandemic the Tokyo 2020 were postponed until 2021. The postpone resulted in the departure of Milicic with new head coach Tony Gustavsson appointed in September 2020.

Under Gustavsson Andreatta moved up to the lead Assistant Coach role for the Tokyo 2020 campaign. That tournament saw The Matildas record their best finish at the Olympics when they finished fourth in the 2020.

2022 saw Andreatta as part of Australia's 2022 campaign which saw a quarter-final exit. In July 2022, Andreatta was appointed Head Coach of the first ever Australia U-23 team. She led the team in the 2022 recording 3 wins, 1 draw and 1 loss in the competition featuring the senior national teams in the South-East Asian region.

With Australia co-hosting the FIFA Women's World Cup later in the year, Australia commenced their preparations with the four nations 2023 with Spain, Czechia and Jamaica participating. Andreatta was in the coaching team that led The Matildas to a second title with three straight wins.

July 2023 saw Andreatta participate in her fifth major international tournament as an Assistant Coach for Australia during the 2023. The tournament saw another historic result for Australia as the team finished fourth – the nation's best ever result at a FIFA World Cup finals (women's or men's).

In April 2025, Mel was appointed as Head Coach of the Scotland Women’s National Team.

== Education ==
Andreatta graduated from Queensland University of Technology in 2003 with a Bachelor of Education in Physical Education Teaching and Coaching.

In 2021 Andreatta obtained her AFC/FFA Pro Diploma to become one of only a handful of Australian women with the highest coaching licence in the AFC.
