= Cannon Clough =

American soccer player (born 1995)

Personal information
- Full name: Barrie Cannon Clough
- Date of birth: November 10, 1995 (age 30)
- Place of birth: Charlotte, North Carolina, United States
- Position: Defender

College career
Years	Team	Apps	(Gls)
2014–2015	Charlotte 49ers	36	(0)
2016–2017	North Carolina Tar Heels	28	(0)

Senior career*
Years	Team	Apps	(Gls)
2021	Lions FC		
2021–2022	Brisbane Roar	11	(0)
2022–2023	Newcastle Jets	18	(0)
2023	Lions FC	9	(0)
2023–2024	Canberra United	19	(1)
2024–2025	Carolina Ascent	0	(0)
2025–2026	Central Coast Mariners	3	(0)
- * Club domestic league appearances and goals as of January 23, 2026

Barrie Cannon Clough (born November 10, 1995) is an American soccer player who last played as a defender for Central Coast Mariners in the A-League Women.

== Early life ==
Clough is a native of North Carolina, United States.

== Education ==
Clough attended the University of North Carolina in the United States, where she studied entrepreneurship.

== College career ==
In February 2014, Clough committed to UNC Charlotte's soccer program. She played 17 games in her freshman year and 19 games as a sophomore. In 2016, she transferred to North Carolina Tar Heels, where she played 15 games in her junior year and 13 games as a senior.

== Club career ==
Clough played for Australian second-tier side Lions FC, helping the club win the league. After that, in September 2021, she signed her first professional contract with Australian W-League side Brisbane Roar. In October 2022, Clough joined Newcastle Jets. In September 2023, she joined Canberra United.

In June 2024, Clough returned to the United States, joining new USL Super League team Carolina Ascent.

In October 2025, Central Coast Mariners announced via Instagram that Clough had joined the club.

In October 2026, it was revealed she had left the club at the end of her contract.

== Style of play ==
Clough mainly operates as a defender and has been described as a "speedy and skillful full back".

== Personal life ==
Clough has been described as a "very good communicator".

== Honors ==
Carolina Ascent

- USL Super League Players' Shield: 2024–25
