= Emily Husband =

English footballer

Personal information
- Place of birth: England
- Position: Defender

Youth career
- Leeds United
- Manchester City

College career
Years	Team	Apps	(Gls)
2008–2012	UTB Ocelots		

Senior career*
Years	Team	Apps	(Gls)
- Huddersfield Town

Managerial career
- 2020–2021: Canberra United (assistant)
- 2020–2023: Sydney Uni
- 2023–2025: Central Coast Mariners
- 2025–: Australia Women (assistant)
- 2026–: Australia Women U-17
- * Club domestic league appearances and goals

Emily Husband is an English professional football manager and former player, who is the assistant coach of the Australia women's national soccer team (Matildas) since mid-2025 and will become the head coach of the Australia women's national under-17 soccer team (Junior Matildas) in late 2026.

She previously managed Australian A-League Women's team Central Coast Mariners FC. In her second season in charge, Husband's team won the 2025 grand final securing their first League Championship.

== Playing career ==
Husband played as a defender. As a youth player, she joined the youth academy of English side Leeds United FC. Following her stint there, she transferred to the youth academy of English side Manchester City WFC. Subsequently, Husband signed for English side Huddersfield Town FC. Afterwards, she attended the University of Texas at Brownsville in the United States, where she played for their soccer team (2008–2012).

== Managerial career ==
Husband was Sydney Uni SFC (Sydney University Soccer Football Club) Reserves head coach from 2017. The team competes in the National Premier Leagues NSW Women's (NPLW NSW). In 2020, she was appointed as an assistant manager of Australian side Canberra United FC. The same year, she was appointed manager of Sydney Uni SFC seniors. The Sydney Morning Herald's Daniel Lo Surdo wrote in 2025 that "Sydney University went on to enjoy a trophy-laden spell under Husband, who attracted praise for her quick success as a first-time coach".

Ahead of the 2023–24 season, Husband was appointed manager of Australian side Central Coast Mariners FC, helping the club win their first league title.

She left the club in June 2025 to become an assistant coach to Joe Montemurro for the Australian Women's National Team.

== Personal life ==
Husband was born in England. A native of Huddersfield, Yorkshire, she arrived in Australian as a backpacker in 2016 and worked on a farm in Rankins Springs, New South Wales.
