= Cassidy Davis =

Australian soccer player (born 1994)

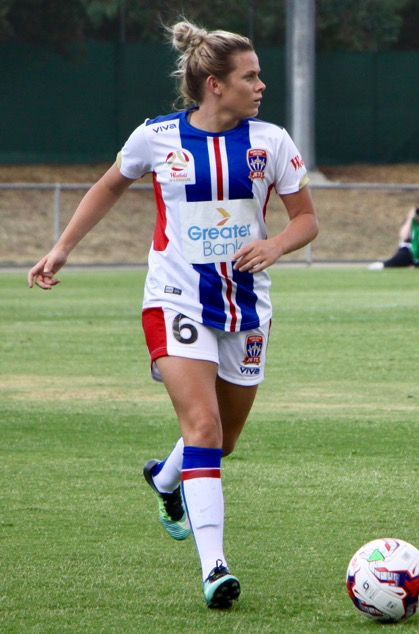

Personal information
- Full name: Cassidy Davis
- Date of birth: 26 August 1994 (age 32)
- Place of birth: Lake Macquarie, New South Wales, Australia
- Height: 1.60 m (5 ft 3 in)
- Position: Defensive midfielder

Team information
- Current team: Newcastle Jets
- Number: 6

Senior career*
Years	Team	Apps	(Gls)
2013	Lake Macquarie	22	(12)
2013–	Newcastle Jets	185	(6)
- * Club domestic league appearances and goals as of 16 October 2026

Cassidy Davis (born 26 August 1994) is an Australian soccer player, who currently plays for Newcastle Jets in the A-League Women.

== Early life ==
Cassidy Davis was born on 26 August 1994 in Lake Macquarie, New South Wales. She began playing netball before switching to soccer at 12-years-old. She was inspired by her father, who was a director of football at Macquarie Football Academy. As a junior Davis played for Warners Bay Panthers in the National Premier Leagues NSW Women's (NPL NSW W), before switching to Lake Macquarie City Women in the NPL Women's Northern NSW Football (NPL W NNSW). In 2011 she was selected for the Northern NSW Institute of Sport.

== Club career ==
=== State level ===
In 2013 Davis joined the senior Lake Macquarie team in the NPL W NNSW. She subsequently transferred to Valentine (2014–2015), Warners Bay (2016–2022) and Lambton (2023–2024).

=== National level ===
Davis signed with her hometown club Newcastle Jets in the W-League (later renamed A-League Women) in 2013 and made her debut on 9 November. She began her career playing in an attacking midfield role for the Jets, however over time she moved into a more defensive position. Davis became the club's co-captain ahead of the 2018-19 season alongside Gema Simon and Emily van Egmond. On Matchday 3 of the 2021-22 season Davis played her 100th consecutive A-League Women match, a league record. In March 2022, Davis made her 109th consecutive appearance in the top flight of Australian soccer. She therefore set the record for most consecutive top flight games in Australia for either a male or female, beating the record previously held by Nikolai Topor-Stanley. As from 16 October 2026 she has had 185 appearances for the club (most appearances of any player) and provided 6 goals.

== Honours ==
Individual

- A-League Women Goal of the Year: 2023–24
