= Central Coast Mariners FC (women) =

Australian women's football club, based in Gosford, NSW

Central Coast Mariners FC Women
- Full name: Central Coast Mariners Football Club
- Nicknames: The Mariners, The Coast, The Marinettes
- Founded: 2008
- Ground: Central Coast Stadium
- Capacity: 20,059
- Owner: Holman Barnes Group (HBG)
- Manager: Dean Heffernan
- League: A-League Women
- 2025–26: 7th of 11
- Website: ccmariners.com.au
Home colours	Away colours	Third colours

The Central Coast Mariners Football Club, also known as the Central Coast Mariners Women, represents the Central Coast Mariners in Australia's premier Women's association football competition, A-League Women.

The club previously participated in the W-League, for two seasons between 2008 and 2009. In July 2010 it was announced the team would not be compete in the 2010 W-League, due to a lack of funding.

The club announced an intention to return to the A-League Women competition for the 2022–23 season, which was subsequently postponed to 2023–24.

The club won its first ever A-League Women championship in the 2024–25 season, defeating Melbourne Victory on penalties in the 2025 grand final, in what was regarded as a major upset and a fairytale run.

== History ==
=== 2008–09 season ===
As one of the 7 established Australian A-League clubs, the Central Coast Mariners Women was announced to coincide with the establishment of the new W-League. In early September, Stephen Roche was appointed as the inaugural team coach. In October 2008, the squad was announced and featured Matildas Kyah Simon, Lyndsay Glohe and Renee Rollason. As the club was funded by Football NSW and not the Mariners exclusively, the W-League outfit played home matches in Sydney's west at Parramatta Stadium and Campbelltown Stadium, which was an opportunity for the Mariners brand to spread into areas outside the Central Coast.

Although the Mariners season got off to a bad start with a loss to the Melbourne Victory, they soon found their feet to record back-to-back wins over Perth Glory and Canberra United, however, against Canberra, lost their first choice keeper Lisa Hartley after she fouled a Canberra United attacker and was shown a straight red card. The following three fixtures were all lost by the Mariners and failed to gain a point, including two back-to-back fixtures where the Mainers failed to score a goal. Those three fixtures were also at the Mariners' second home, Campbelltown Stadium, which proved to be the bogey ground for the Central Coast outfit as they failed to gain a single competition point from the venue. However, in round 7, the Mariners responded with a 6–0 drubbing of Adelaide United, in Adelaide. That result would become the biggest team score and also the biggest win in the inaugural season by any team. Unable to maintain the momentum, the Mariners again lost another two back-to-back fixtures without scoring a goal and other results didn't go their way leading into the final round which meant a win against Melbourne Victory would not be enough to finish in the top 4 for the finals. The Mariners did win their final match for the regular season, almost ending Melbourne's finals hopes. The match was played in torrential rain, however, the Parramatta pitch held up as the Mariners put two late goals past the Victory shot stopper to win the match 2–0. With the Mariners in fifth at the conclusion of the round 10 fixture, only a win by Sydney FC would put the Mariners into sixth and Melbourne into fifth. In a thrilling match, Sydney were up 3–0 within 28 minutes, but Adelaide United were not to be out done, with a thrilling finish that saw Adelaide score two mid-second-half goals, but could push for a third. Sydney defeated Adelaide 3–2 and attained the remaining finals spot. That result confirming the Mariners' 6th position on the ladder, divided only by goal difference with the fifth placed Melbourne.

Kyah Simon, the leading goal scorer for the Mariners with 5, was only 2 goals short of the golden boot award which went eventually to Sydney's Leena Khamis. In a season that featured 4 wins and 6 losses from the 10 fixtures, the Mariners would be looking to improve on that for the next season.

=== 2009 season ===
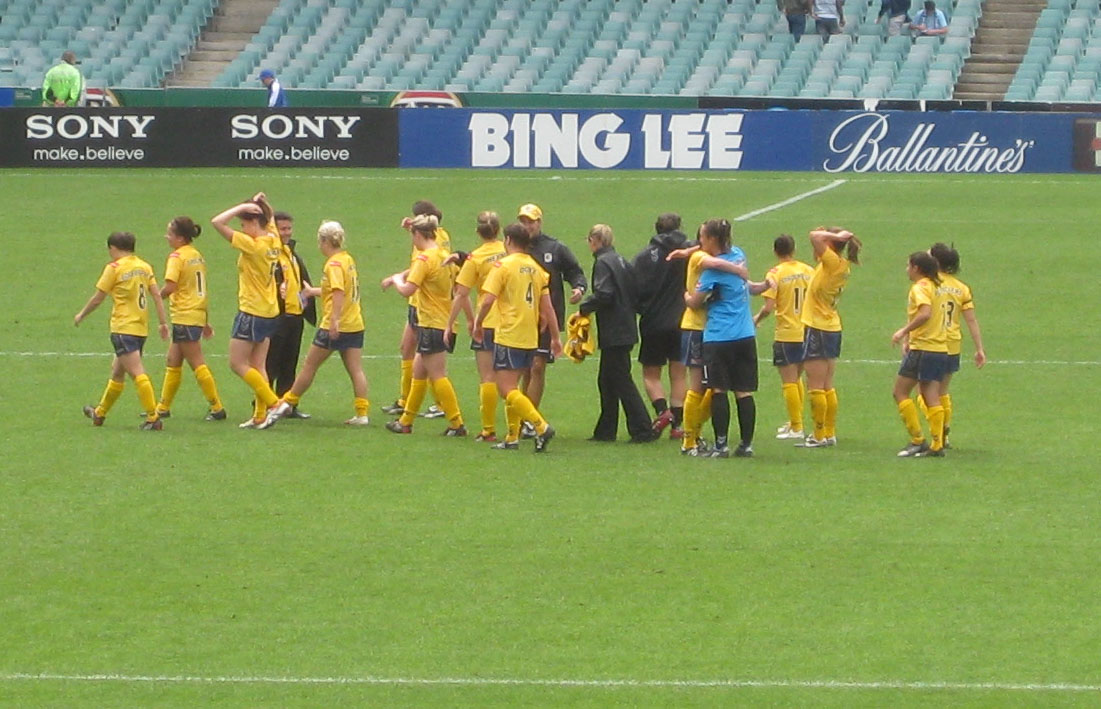
The Mariners Women after a victory against Sydney FC.

After not making the finals in the inaugural season, many changes were to follow. Eleven players from season 1 did not have their contract re-newed with the Mariners. As a result, there were ten new signings for the new season. Five of which from Sydney FC Rachel Cooper; Jessica Seaman; Samantha Spackman; Kelly Golebiowski; Michelle Heyman, and three from the USA Jillian Loyden; Kendall Fletcher; Lydia Vandenbergh, with Caitlin Foord and Ashleigh Connor from the AIS and Illawarra Stingrays respectively.

But the changes were to continue as the Mariners' would now play their home matches at the real home (men's senior and youth teams) of the Central Coast Mariners, then named Bluetongue Stadium. Other home matches were played at Canberra Stadium against Canberra (as a double-header with a Men's A-League fixture), and at Leichhardt Oval in Sydney as part of a W-League double-header.

The new season started in the best possible fashion for the Mariners with a 3–1 victory over traditional rivals Sydney FC away at the Sydney Football Stadium. The derby fueled by the fact that all three goals from the Mariners were scored from former Sydney players – Kelly Golebiowski and a double by Michelle Heyman. The Mariners continued their winning streak to a club record of 3 consecutive wins with a 2–0 victory over Adelaide at the Mariners first home game at Bluetongue Stadium in wet conditions. In a match dominated by the yellow and navy, goals were hard to come by, however the final 17 minutes produced the match winning goals from Trudy Camilleri and Ashleigh Connor, with the latter being a driven low shot from the edge of the 6-yard box. The inaugural champions (Brisbane Roar) were the next opponents in a top of the table clash. In a tight affair the Roar dominated the possession and the shots at goal. Late in the second-half, the Roar scored the one and only goal of the match. With a loss to the Roar, the Mariners were looking to get back on the score sheet and into the winners circle and that's just what they did against the near rivals Newcastle. The derby produced 6 goals with the Mariners 5–1 runaway winners. Lydia Vandenburgh scored with only 5 minutes gone. Michelle Heyman added another two and on the half-hour mark it was 3–0. A second-half penalty to Kendall Fletcher and a late goal from substitute Trudy Camilleri completed the Mariners scoring, but an 89th minute consolation goal to the Jets rounded off the scoring.

=== Hiatus ===
Due to lack of funding the Central Coast Mariners were forced to pull out of the 2010–11 W-League season.

=== Return to the A-League ===
The Central Coast Mariners returned for the 2023–24 A-League Women season, with all home games to be played at Central Coast Stadium. Their first fixture upon their return to the competition was against Newcastle Jets.

At the end of the 2023-2024 season, the Central Coast Mariners finished fifth and made the semi finals.

In their second season in the Ninja A-league, the women won the 2024–25 A-League Women Championship.

== Colours and badge ==
The club colours are yellow and navy blue. The club badge depicts a yellow football at the centre of a wave.

== Ownership ==
Unlike other A-League Women clubs with an affiliated A-League Men club, since 2026 the Mariners women's side has been owned and operated by a separate ownership to their A-League Men team.

After the sale of the men's side and academy to Total Soccer Growth Holdings (TSG) in June 2026, the Australian Professional Leagues (APL) was tasked to find new ownership for the women's team in time for the 2026–27 season.

On 4 August 2026, Holman Barnes Group (HBG), majority owners of NRL club Wests Tigers, was confirmed as the owners of the women's team. Under this arrangement, the licence for the club would remain with TSG, with HBG taking on the day-to-day responsibilities for running the A-League Women department.

== Stadium ==
The club played home games at a number of locations, including Bluetongue Stadium (home of the Central Coast Mariners) as well as Parramatta Stadium, Campbelltown Stadium, Leichhardt Oval and Canberra Stadium.

As of 2023–24, the club plays all their home games at Central Coast Stadium, the same venue as the men's team.

Women's Academy games (FNSW League 1 and FNSW Youth League 2) are played at Pluim Park, Lisarow. Home of Central Coast Football.

== Players ==
=== First-team squad ===
As of 15 October 2026

Note: Flags indicate national team as defined under FIFA eligibility rules; some limited exceptions apply. Players may hold more than one non-FIFA nationality.

No.	Pos.	Nation	Player
1	GK	AUS	Morgan Aquino
2	DF	NZL	Rebecca Lake
3	DF	AUS	Liz Barwick-Grey
4	DF	AUS	Alexia Karrys-Stahl
5	MF	NZL	Charlotte Lancaster
6	MF	NZL	Te Reremoana Walker
7	FW	USA	Morgan Witz
8	FW	AUS	Talia Kapetanellis
9	FW	AUS	Skye Halmarick
11	DF	AUS	Danika Matos
12	MF	AUS	Tiana Fuller

No.	Pos.	Nation	Player
13	DF	AUS	Kaiya Buchanan
14	MF	AUS	Greta Kraszula
15	GK	AUS	Annalee Grove
16	MF	AUS	Tess Quilligan
17	FW	AUS	Kiara De Domizio
18	DF	AUS	Taren King (captain)
19	MF	AUS	Fiorina Iaria
21	FW	AUS	Eliza Familton
22	FW	AUS	Peta Trimis
23	DF	SUI	Lorena Baumann
30	GK	AUS	Sophia Varley

=== CCM Academy & Youth ===
As of 13 April 2026

Note: Flags indicate national team as defined under FIFA eligibility rules; some limited exceptions apply. Players may hold more than one non-FIFA nationality.

No.	Pos.	Nation	Player
1	GK	AUS	Scarlet Gray
2	FW	AUS	Briana Myers
3	DF	AUS	Teagan Jones
4	DF	AUS	Ruth Hosie
5	MF	AUS	Lily Quayle
6	MF	AUS	Amber Ford
7	FW	AUS	Matilda Gallagher
8	MF	AUS	Tikka Jeffrey
9	FW	AUS	Peyton Scollay
10	FW	AUS	Summer Pollard
11	MF	AUS	Chloe Cattley
12	MF	AUS	Annabel Goodman
13	FW	AUS	Marlie McFadden
14	XX	AUS	Abby Buttsowrk
15	XX	AUS	
16	XX	AUS	Rhianna Turk
17	FW	AUS	Isabella Beresford
18	MF	AUS	Bailey Buckby

No.	Pos.	Nation	Player
19	GK	AUS	Grace Davies
20	XX	AUS	
21	XX	AUS	
22	MF	AUS	Ava Moller
23	XX	AUS	Elouise Avenant
24	XX	AUS	Julie Martin
25	DF	AUS	Zoe Jefferson
26	XX	AUS	
27	XX	AUS	Isabella Nicolussi
28	XX	AUS	Zara McKenzie
29	DF	AUS	Natalia Watkins
31	DF	AUS	Kara Bloomfield
32	XX	AUS	Marlie McFadden
33	XX	AUS	
35	XX	AUS	
36	XX	AUS	
37	GK	AUS	Lilah Bredenkamp

== Club officials ==
=== Management ===
Position	Name
Chairman and Minority Owner	(Australia) TBC
Majority Owner	(Australia) TBC
Chief Executive Officer	(Australia) TBC
Advisory Director	

=== Technical staff ===
Position	Name
Head coach (A-League)	(Australia) Dean Heffernan
Assistant coach (A-League)	(Australia) Oliver Bozanic
Assistant coach (A-League)	(Australia) Sinead Coackley
Goalkeeper coach (A-League)	(New Zealand) Bailey Jordan
Team Manager (A-League)	(Australia) Courtney Harper
Head coach (Women's Academy)	(Australia) Cas Wright
Assistant Coach (Women's Academy)	(Australia) Alisha Ingrey
Academy Coordinator (Women's Academy)	(Australia) Nyah Small

== Honours ==
- A-League Women:
  - Champions: 2024–25
- W-League Premiership:
  - Runners-up: 2009

== Records ==
- League victory:
  - 6–0 v Adelaide United, 6 December 2008
  - 6–0 v Adelaide United, 14 November 2009
- Top scorer:
  - (Australia) Michelle Heyman (11)
- Most appearances:
  - (Australia) Annalise RASMUSSEN (27)
  - (Australia) Peta TRIMIS (27)

Head to head record

Club	Pld	W	D	L	GF	GA	GD
Adelaide United	3	3	0	0	14	0	+14
Brisbane Roar	4	0	0	4	0	9	−9
Canberra United	3	1	1	1	3	5	−2
Melbourne Victory	3	2	0	1	4	2	+2
Newcastle Jets	3	2	0	1	10	6	+4
Perth Glory	2	2	0	0	5	2	+3
Sydney FC	3	1	0	2	3	4	−1
Total	21	11	1	9	39	28	+11

== See also ==
- Central Coast Mariners FC
- W-League
- Central Coast Mariners FC W-League players
