= A-League Women =

Association football league in Australia

- Organising body: Football Australia (2008–2020); Australian Professional Leagues (2020–present)
- Founded: 25 October 2008; 18 years ago
- First season: 2008–09
- Country: Australia (11 teams)
- Other club from: New Zealand (1 team)
- Confederation: Asian Football Confederation
- Number of clubs: 12
- Level on pyramid: 1
- International cup: AFC Women's Champions League
- Current champions: Melbourne City (5th title) (2025–26)
- Current premiers: Melbourne City (5th title) (2025–26)
- Most championships: Melbourne City; Sydney FC (5 titles each)
- Most premierships: Melbourne City; Sydney FC (5 titles each)
- Broadcasters: Australia: Network 10 Paramount+; New Zealand: Sky Open Sky Sport; International: Broadcasters
- Website: aleagues.com.au
- Current: 2026–27 A-League Women

A-League Women (currently known as the Ninja A-League for sponsorship reasons), known as the W-League until September 2021, is the top-division soccer league in Australia. The W-League was established in 2008 by Football Australia (then known as Football Federation Australia) and was originally composed of eight teams of which seven had an affiliation with an existing A-League Men's club. As of the 2025–26 season, the league is contested by 11 teams. The league, as well as the A-League Men and A-League Youth are administered by the Australian Professional Leagues.

Seasons run from November to April and include a 23-round regular season and an end-of-season finals series playoff tournament involving the six highest-placed teams, culminating in a Grand Final match. The winner of the regular season tournament is dubbed "premier" and the winner of the grand final is dubbed "champion". The premiers qualify for the AFC Women's Champions League, starting from the 2024–25 season.

Since the league's inaugural season, a total of five clubs have been crowned premiers and five clubs have been crowned champions. It has been currently running on a semi-professional basis, but talks about professionalisation have been emerging, beginning with the name change and placing of all women's clubs into one single Australian Professional Leagues operation and management in 2021, which served as the precursors for complete transition to professionalism of the A-League Women.

Melbourne City are both the current premiers and champions, having won their fifth titles in each.

== History ==
Club locations map

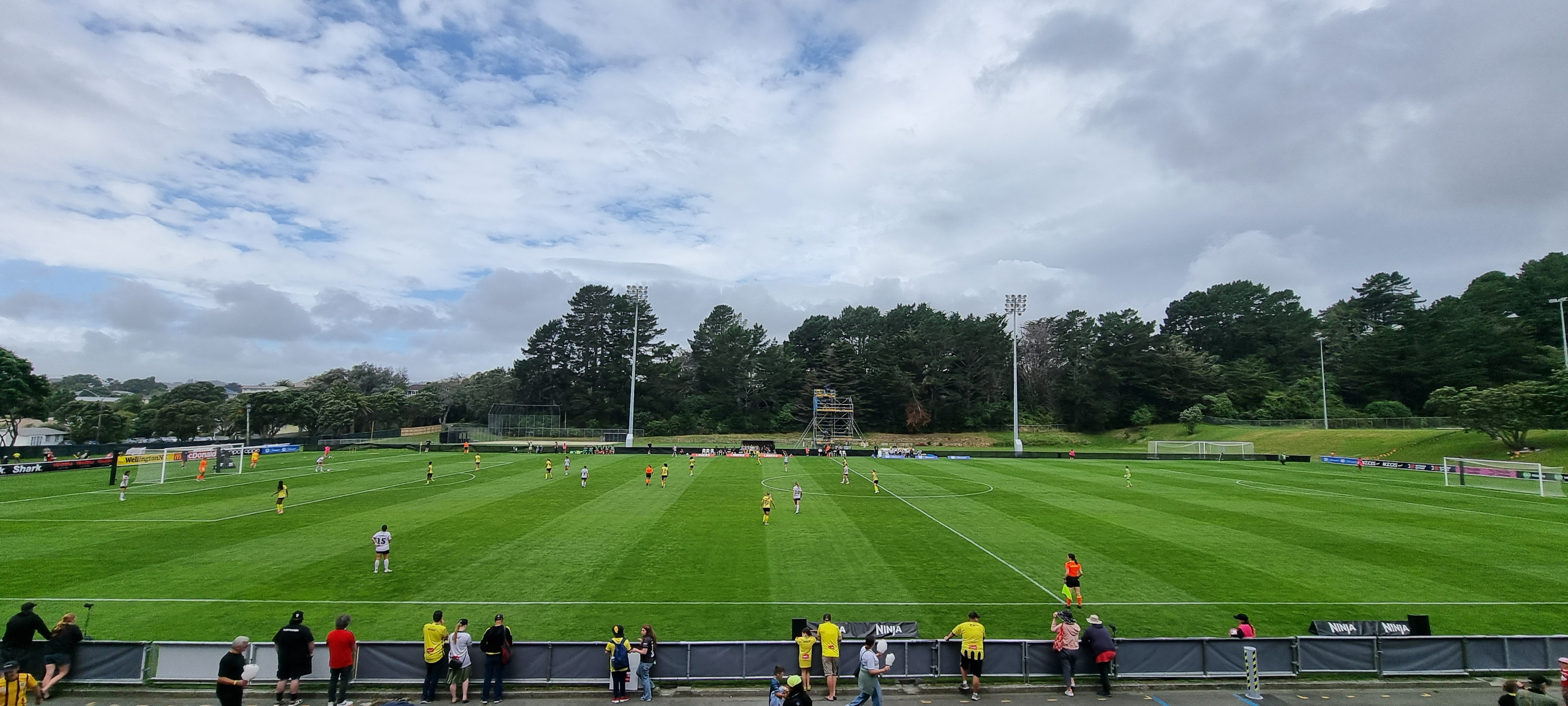
Match between the Wellington Phoenix and Adelaide United at Porirua Park (Jerry Collins Stadium) on 25 January 2026.

Between 1996 and 2004 the Women's National Soccer League (WNSL) was Australia's top women's soccer league. In 2004 it was discontinued alongside the men's National Soccer League.

After Australia qualified for the quarter-finals of the 2007 FIFA Women's World Cup, head coach Tom Sermanni felt the establishment of a professional league was vital for continuing the development of players. Football Federation Australia established the league the following year. The W-League was initially composed of eight teams: Adelaide United, Brisbane Roar, Central Coast Mariners, Melbourne Victory, Newcastle Jets, Perth Glory, and Sydney FC. Seven of the eight teams were affiliated with A-League clubs, and shared their names and colours to promote their brands. The eighth club was Canberra United.

The W-League's inaugural season commenced on 25 October 2008, with Perth hosting Sydney at Members Equity Stadium. After ten rounds, the regular season finished with Queensland Roar as the top-placed team, becoming the first W-League premiers, and advancing to the semi-finals along with the second-, third- and fourth-placed teams. Queensland faced Canberra in the 2009 W-League grand final, defeating them 2–0 to take the champions trophy.

Central Coast Mariners were forced to withdraw from the 2010–11 season due to a lack of funding, but returned in 2023–24.

When Western Sydney Wanderers joined the A-League for the 2012–13 season, they also entered a team into the W-League, returning the competition to eight teams. From 2012 to 2014, the W-League champion team qualified into an international competition, the International Women's Club Championship.

On 13 May 2015, Melbourne City were confirmed to compete in the W-League from the 2015–16 season. The club had a remarkable inaugural season, winning all 12 of its regular season games and winning the Grand Final.

From the inception of the competition the league was run by Football Federation Australia, the governing body for the sport in Australia. In July 2019, the FFA relinquished operational control of the league to each of the clubs, now represented by the Australian Professional Leagues.

The league commenced a further expansion program starting in 2021, with Wellington Phoenix commencing in the 2021–22 season, Western United for the 2022–23 season, and Central Coast Mariners for the 2023–24 season. Future expansion was planned for the 2025–26 season following the awarding of a licence to Auckland FC for teams in both the A-League Men and A-League Women competitions. However, the club's women's team expansion was later delayed by the APL until the 2027–28 season.

Crowds have improved remarkably in 2023, on the back of the Matildas performance in the 2023 FIFA Women's World Cup. The record A-League Women's crowd (including finals) was set on 14 October 2023, with the match between Sydney FC and the Western Sydney Wanderers drawing a crowd of 11,471.

Around 15 April 2024, the 2023–24 A-League Women season become the most attended season of any women's sport in Australian history by recording a total attendance of 284,551; the season finished with a final total attendance of 312,199.

The number of clubs reduced from 12 in the 2024–25 season to 11, following the removal of Western United by Football Australia for financial reasons.

== Competition format ==
The A-League Women regular season typically runs from November to April and consists of 23 games per team (22 home and away, plus one additional "Unite Round" fixture), with the highest ranked team winning the title of "Premier". The top six teams in the regular season then advance to the knockout finals series (single elimination finals, two-legged semi-finals), with the Champion determined by the victor of the Grand Final.

On 12 December 2022, the Australian Professional Leagues (APL) announced that the grand finals for the 2022–23 and two subsequent seasons would be hosted in Sydney, a move which received considerable backlash. On 18 October 2023, the APL announced that the Grand Final hosting rights would revert back to the original format, and instead a new "Unite Round" was introduced, with a regular season round having all its games played in Sydney.

== Special events ==
=== Pride Round ===
Pride Cup is an Australian organisation dedicated to advocating for the LGBTQIA+ community in sport. It was founded in 2012 after former Australian rules footballer Jason Ball came out publicly as gay, and his club in Yarra Glen, Victoria showed their support by staging a "Pride Cup". This led to the establishment of the annual AFL Pride Game in 2016, and the idea soon spread to other codes. After Adelaide United player Josh Cavallo became the first openly gay top-flight male footballer in October 2021, the A-League partnered with A-League Women to stage a single Pride men's and women's doubleheader during the 2021–22 season.

On 24–26 February 2023, both the A-League Men and Women's competitions staged their first-ever Pride Round, the first occasion in which the leagues had "come together to recognise and promote inclusion for the LGBTQIA+ community". Part proceeds from ticket sales across all of the round's fixtures were donated to Pride Cup. In 2024, the Australian Professional Leagues (APL) announced the continuation of the round, as well as providing inclusion training to all players and key stakeholders. The A-Leagues would be collaborating with the PFA and Pride Cup, who would help to deliver the training. The annual Pride Cup double-header between Adelaide United and Melbourne Victory would take place in March, and several men's and women's teams would celebrate by engaging community groups and using indicators such as rainbow corner flags, armbands, special Pride kit and/or rainbow socks.

=== Unite Round ===
During the 2023–24 and 2024–25 the Australian Professional Leagues has held a "Unite Round". During this round, all matches are held in a single city. The round was in partnership with Destination NSW, and was introduced after the Grand Final decision was reversed in October 2023. Unite Round was discontinued ahead of the 2025–26 season.

Season	Dates	City	Venues (matches)	Attendance		
Season	Dates	City	Venues (matches)	Men	Women	Total
2023–24	12–14 January 2024	Sydney	Allianz Stadium (4), CommBank Stadium (4), Leichhardt Oval (4)	36,203	11,222	47,425
2024–25	22–24 November 2024	Sydney	Allianz Stadium (6), Netstrata Jubilee Stadium (6)	61,911	9,394	71,305

== Clubs ==

Current clubs
Team	Location	Stadium	Capacity	Founded	Joined	Head coach	Captain	Highest finish	Most recent finish
Adelaide United	Adelaide, South Australia	ServiceFM Stadium; Coopers Stadium	7,000; 17,000	2008	2008	(Australia) Theo Tsiounis	(Australia) Adriana Taranto	3rd	3rd
Brisbane Roar	Brisbane, Queensland	Imperial Corp Stadium	5,000	2008	2008	(Australia) Johnathan Clemente	(Australia) Natalie Tathem	1st	9th
Canberra United	Canberra, ACT	McKellar Park	3,500	2008	2008	(Australia) Antoni Jagarinec	(Australia) Michelle Heyman	1st	5th
Central Coast Mariners	Gosford, New South Wales	Central Coast Stadium	20,059	2008	2008; 2023 (re-entry)	(Australia) Dean Heffernan	(Australia) Taren King	2nd	2nd
Melbourne City	Melbourne, Victoria	ctrl:cyber Pitch; AAMI Park	1,500; 30,050	2015	2015	(Australia) Michael Matricciani	(New Zealand) Rebekah Stott	1st	1st
Melbourne Victory	Melbourne, Victoria	The Home of the Matildas; AAMI Park	3,000; 30,050	2008	2008	(Wales) Jeff Hopkins	(United States) Kayla Morrison	1st	4th
Newcastle Jets	Newcastle, New South Wales	No.2 Sportsground; Maitland Sports Ground; Hunter City Motor Group Stadium; McDonald Jones Stadium	5,000; 5,000; 5,000; 33,000	2008	2008	(England) Stephen Hoyle	(Australia) Cassidy Davis	2nd	10th
Perth Glory	Perth, Western Australia	Sam Kerr Football Centre; HBF Park	2,500; 20,500	2008	2008	(Australia) Stephen Peters	(Australia) Isobel Dalton	1st	6th
Sydney FC	Sydney, New South Wales	WIN Stadium; Sydney Olympic Park Athletic Centre; Cromer Park	23,750; 5,000; 5,000	2008	2008	(Australia) James Slaveski	(Australia) Natalie Tobin	1st	1st
Wellington Phoenix	Wellington, New Zealand	Hnry Stadium; Jerry Collins Stadium	34,500; 1,900	2021	2021	(England) Bev Priestman	(New Zealand) CJ Bott	2nd	2nd
Western Sydney Wanderers	Sydney, New South Wales	CommBank Stadium; Blacktown Football Park; Marconi Stadium	30,000; 500; 9,000	2012	2012	(Australia) Geoff Abrahams	(Australia) Rhianna Pollicina	3rd	7th

Future clubs
Team	City	State	Stadium	Capacity	Founded	Planned entry
Auckland FC	Auckland	Auckland	TBC	TBC	2023	2027 (Note: For the 2027–28 season.)
Macarthur FC	Campbelltown	New South Wales	TBC	TBC	2017	2027

Former clubs
Team	City	State	Stadium	Capacity	Founded	Joined	Exited
Western United	Wyndham	Victoria	Ironbark Fields	5,000	2021	2022	2025

=== Performance record ===
Performance and ranking of clubs based on their best regular season result in the W-League and A-League Women.

Rank	Club	Best result	08–09	09	10–11	11–12	12–13	13–14	14	15–16	16–17	17–18	18–19	19–20	20–21	21–22	22–23	23–24	24–25	25–26
1	Melbourne City	1st (5 times)	—							1	4	4	5	1	7	2	3	1	1	1
2	Sydney FC	1st (5 times)	4	1	1	3	4	2	4	3	3	2	3	3	1	1	1	2	8	10
3	Brisbane Roar	1st (3 times)	1	3	2	2	1	4	6	4	7	1	2	5	2	6	9	9	7	4
4	Canberra United	1st (3 times)	3	4	3	1	5	1	3	2	1	5	8	6	4	7	5	11	5	3
5	Melbourne Victory	1st	5	5	4	4	3	3	2	9	9	7	1	2	3	4	4	4	2	6
6	Perth Glory	1st	7	6	5	6	2	5	1	8	2	6	4	7	9	5	6	10	10	8
7	Newcastle Jets	2nd	2	8	6	5	7	8	5	6	5	3	7	9	8	8	10	6	11	9
8	Central Coast Mariners	2nd	6	2	—													5	4	7
9	Wellington Phoenix	2nd	—													10	11	8	9	2
10	Western United	2nd	—														2	3	6	—
11	Adelaide United	3rd	8	7	7	7	8	6	7	5	6	9	6	8	5	3	8	12	3	5
12	Western Sydney Wanderers	3rd	—				6	7	8	7	8	8	9	3	6	9	7	7	12	11

Key
	League premiers and qualifier for W-League/A-League Women finals
	Qualifier for W-League/A-League Women finals
—	Not part of that season's competition

== Organisation ==
=== Squad formation and salaries ===
An A-League Women squad is required to have a minimum of 20 and a maximum of 26 players. Players typically receive a one-season contract, with many playing in leagues in other countries during the A-League Women off-season. Due to the A-League Women season running during the off-season of several leagues around the world, many foreign players have played for teams in A-League Women and vice versa.

In 2015, teams in what was then the W-League had a salary cap of A$150,000. Individual player salaries varied, with one player reporting to The Sydney Morning Herald in 2012 that whilst some players earned A$10,000, others earned nothing. In 2014, it was reported that Sydney FC players were paid salaries ranging from $1,000 to $6,000. Players could also earn money playing overseas and may therefore be considered by Professional Footballers Australia (PFA) as professional.

Some clubs are owned by their state soccer associations, including Adelaide United and Newcastle Jets.

For the 2017–18 season a minimum salary was introduced at A$10,000. The average salary therefore rose from A$15,500 to A$17,400. A salary cap was set at A$300,000.

The total salary floor, or minimum salary spend, for the 2020–21 season rose to A$294,000, growing to A$315,000 in the 2021–22 season, with a salary cap of A$450,000, as part of a five-year deal that would see the salary floor rise to A$390,000 by 2025–26. The deal also included improved standards in training venues, travel and accommodation, high performance staffing, and player workloads. The A-League Women minimum annual wage in 2021 was A$17,055. This increased to A$25,000 in 2023 owing to the extended season, which was a full home-and-away schedule for the first time. As of March 2024, players are contracted for 35 weeks for a 22-round regular season, with four extra weeks for those playing in the finals.

A 2023 survey showed that most players in the league work and/or study part-time, having to supplement their part-time income. According to the PFA, most players "earned at or close to the minimum" in the previous season, with around 60 per cent of players having had to work second jobs; by way of comparison, only 15 per cent of A-League Men were working second jobs, with the vast majority of those working fewer than 10 hours per week. After the success of the 2023 FIFA Women's World Cup held in Australia and New Zealand, there were renewed calls to make the competition a full-time one.

=== Branding ===
A-League Women logo (2021–2024)

The competition was known as the Westfield W-League from its inception in 2008 until 2021, under an agreement with Westfield as the naming rights sponsor. The main logo design was shared with the A-League men's competition. In 2017, Football Australia undertook a major rebranding and redesigned its logos for the W-League and A-League to be in line with its own logo, and those of its member federations.

After governance of the league was handed to the Australian Professional Leagues in 2020, there was another rebranding in September 2021, which saw the competition being renamed to A-League Women. Liberty Financial became the league's new naming rights sponsor shortly afterwards in December 2021 and the competition was then known as the Liberty A-League Women. Since September 2024, the league is known as Ninja A-League Women with home appliances company SharkNinja as the current naming rights sponsor.

=== Stadiums ===
A-League Women games have been played in 91 venues since the inaugural season of the A-League.

== Broadcasting ==
The 2018–19 season marked the first time that fans were able to watch every W-League game. All matches were broadcast or streamed on Fox Sports, SBS Viceland and the My Football Live app. Thursday Night Football was also introduced, meaning 13 stand-alone regular season matches will be played in prime-time and broadcast live on Fox Sports. The Football Federation Australia (FFA) reached a deal with ESPN+ for broadcast rights to W-League games in the United States. ESPN+ will carry at least 17 W-League matches in the 2018–19 season. For the first time ever W-League games would be broadcast on YouTube and Twitter in territories without a traditional broadcast partner.

In the 2019–20 season, ABC TV broadcast one game per weekend. Fourteen rounds of that season were broadcast at 4pm on Sundays, as well as the whole W-League 2020 Finals Series. Fox Sport's contract with the A-League, which was renegotiated in June 2020 amidst the COVID-19 pandemic, concluded in July 2021.

From July 2019 to the end of the 2020–21 season, Foxtel broadcast all matches with ABC broadcasting one match per round live on its primary channel.

Since August 2021, as part of a five-year deal with ViacomCBS, the A-Leagues have been broadcast by Network 10 and Paramount+ (Australia) streaming service. As of the 2022–23 season, Paramount and Network 10's free-to-access streaming service 10Play stream all matches.

In New Zealand, A-League Men and A-League Women matches are broadcast on Sky Sport / beIN Sports.

=== Current broadcasters ===
Territory	Network
Australia	Network 10
Australia	Paramount+
New Zealand	Sky Open
New Zealand	Sky Sport
Pacific Islands	Australia TV
Pacific Islands	Pasifika TV
International	Sport24 (in-flight and ship only)
International	YouTube (unsold markets only)
Brazil	Canal Gol Brasil
China	Leisu Sports
Hong Kong	HOY TV
Ireland	TNT Sports
United Kingdom	TNT Sports
Macau	Macau Cable
United States	ESPN

== Referees ==
A-League Women features female referees and assistant referees from Australia. Notable referees include:

- Kate Jacewicz, who refereed nine of the first eleven Finals.
- Katie Patterson
- Casey Reibelt

== Honours ==
W-League and A-League Women winners
Season	Premiers (regular season winners)	Champions (Grand Final winners)
2008–09	Queensland Roar (Note: Queensland Roar changed their name to Brisbane Roar for the 2009 season onwards.)	Queensland Roar
2009	Sydney FC	Sydney FC
2010–11	Sydney FC	Brisbane Roar
2011–12	Canberra United	Canberra United
2012–13	Brisbane Roar	Sydney FC
2013–14	Canberra United	Melbourne Victory
2014	Perth Glory	Canberra United
2015–16	Melbourne City	Melbourne City
2016–17	Canberra United	Melbourne City
2017–18	Brisbane Roar	Melbourne City
2018–19	Melbourne Victory	Sydney FC
2019–20	Melbourne City	Melbourne City
2020–21	Sydney FC	Melbourne Victory
2021–22	Sydney FC	Melbourne Victory
2022–23	Sydney FC	Sydney FC
2023–24	Melbourne City	Sydney FC
2024–25	Melbourne City	Central Coast Mariners
2025–26	Melbourne City	Melbourne City

== Records ==
=== Most appearances ===
As of 16 October 2026.

Players listed in bold are still actively playing in the A-League Women.

Rank	Player	Appearances
1	(Australia) **Michelle Heyman**	221
2	(Australia) **Tameka Yallop**	189
3	(Australia) **Cassidy Davis**	185
4	(Australia) **Rebekah Stott**	166
5	(Australia) Casey Dumont	165
6	(Australia) **Princess Ibini**	160
7	(Australia) Kim Carroll	159
8	(Australia) Teresa Polias	157
9	(Australia) Clare Polkinghorne	152
10	(Australia) Caitlin Cooper	151
10	(Australia) Amy Harrison	151
10	(Australia) Gema Simon	151

=== Top scorers ===
As of 16 October 2026.

Players listed in bold are still actively playing in the A-League Women.

Rank	Player	Goals
1	(Australia) **Michelle Heyman**	125
2	(Australia) **Tameka Yallop**	77
3	(Australia) Samantha Kerr	70
4	(Australia) Emily Gielnik	67
5	(Australia) Kyah Simon	53
6	(Australia) Leena Khamis	46
7	(Australia) Tara Andrews	45
8	(Australia) **Melina Ayres**	44
8	(Australia) Ashleigh Sykes	44
10	(Australia) Lisa De Vanna	42
10	(Australia) Kate Gill	42
10	(Australia) Holly McNamara	42

== See also ==
- AFC Women's Club Championship
- A-League Women records and statistics
- Women's soccer in Australia
- Australia women's national soccer team
- Women's National Soccer League (WNSL) – defunct Australian women's national league
- A-League Men
