= Jeff Hopkins =

Welsh footballer and manager

Personal information
- Full name: Jeffrey Hopkins
- Date of birth: 14 April 1964 (age 62)
- Place of birth: Swansea, Wales
- Height: 1.83 m (6 ft 0 in)
- Position: Defender

Youth career
- Fulham

Senior career*
Years	Team	Apps	(Gls)
1981–1988	Fulham	219	(4)
1988–1992	Crystal Palace	70	(2)
1991	→ Plymouth Argyle (loan)	8	(0)
1992	Bristol Rovers	6	(0)
1992–1997	Reading	131	(3)
1997–1999	Selangor		
1999–2000	Gippsland Falcons	23	(0)

International career
1981–1983	Wales U21	5	(0)
1983–1990	Wales	16	(0)

Managerial career
- 1999–2001: Gippsland Falcons
- 2002: Falcons 2000
- 2008–2012: Brisbane Roar Women's
- 2012–2013: Brisbane Roar (Asst. Manager)
- 2013–2014: Brisbane Roar Youth
- 2014–2015: Brisbane Roar (Asst. Manager)
- 2016–: Melbourne Victory Women
- 2022: Melbourne Victory FC AWT
- 2026–: Melbourne Victory Youth Women
- * Club domestic league appearances and goals

Jeffrey Hopkins (born 14 April 1964) is a Welsh former international football defender and current Melbourne Victory Women head coach, who most notably played club football for Fulham and Reading in the Football League.

== Club career ==
Hopkins started his career as a trainee with Fulham, going on to make over 200 first team appearances for the club. This was followed by a four-year spell at Crystal Palace, including a loan to Plymouth Argyle in 1991–92. He spent a few months at Bristol Rovers in 1992, before spending the remaining five years of his Football League career with Reading.

While at Reading, he was part of the team that narrowly missed out on promotion to the Premier League in the 1994–95 season, losing 4–3 after extra time in the playoff final against Bolton Wanderers.

After a move to Malaysian football with Selangor where he was made captain, Hopkins moved to Australia in October 1999 as a player-coach with Gippsland Falcons in the National Soccer League.

== International career ==
Hopkins made his debut for the Wales national under-21 football team during the 1981/82 season against France. He made a total of 5 under-21 appearances during that season and the next.

Hopkins made his debut for the senior Welsh team on 31 May 1983 against Northern Ireland, and he made 16 appearances for Wales over the next seven years, with his final game coming against Costa Rica on 20 May 1990.

== Management ==
Hopkins was named player-manager of the Gippsland Falcons in the lead-up to the 1999-2000 National Soccer League Season after the departure of Stuart Munro to rivals Carlton SC. Hopkins became full-time manager during the season and retired from playing. He departed when the club exited the National Soccer League at the end of the 2000-2001 National Soccer League Season.

Hopkins was coach of the Brisbane Roar women's team from their inaugural season in 2008, in which he led the team to a championship-premiership double. On 15 June 2012 it was announced he had been appointed as senior first team Assistant manager. On 30 April 2013, at the end of Brisbane Roar's 2012–13 A-League season, the Roar announced that he would become the Brisbane Roar Youth coach for the 2013–14 A-League National Youth League season. On 26 November 2014, following the resignation of Ron Smith, Hopkins moved into the role of assistant coach of Brisbane Roar. On 17 June 2016, Hopkins was appointed head coach of the Melbourne Victory women's team.

Hopkins served as the inaugural manager of the Melbourne Victory FC AWT. Playing their inaugural season in State League 4 West, the seventh tier of Australian women's football and sixth in the Victorian structure, the AWT finished in third place, a result which saw them promoted to State League 3 East. Hopkins was succeeded as AWT manager by Jorge Leon for the 2023 State League 3 East season. In 2026 Hopkins would be announced to replace Santi Escudero as coach of the Melbourne Victory Women's Youth team.

== Managerial statistics ==
As of 22 December 2023

Team	Nat	From	To	Record				
Team	Nat	From	To	G	W	D	L	Win %
Brisbane Roar	(Australia)	1 July 2008	30 June 2012	46	31	9	6	67.39
Melbourne Victory	(Australia)	17 June 2016	present	110	50	25	35	45.45
Total				156	81	34	41	51.92

== Honours ==
Crystal Palace

- Football League Second Division play-offs: 1989

Reading

- Football League Second Division: 1993–94
