= A-League Women transfers for 2024–25 season =

This is a list of Australian soccer transfers for the 2024–25 A-League Women. Only moves featuring at least one A-League Women club are listed.

== Transfers ==
All players without a flag are Australian. Clubs without a flag are clubs participating in the A-League Women.

=== Pre-season ===
Date	Name	Moving from	Moving to
11 March 2024	Lilly Bailey	Perth Glory	(United States) Morehead State Eagles
12 March 2024	Emma Checker	Melbourne Victory	Retired
2 April 2024	(Serbia) Vesna Milivojević	Canberra United	(Sweden) Norrköping
9 April 2024	Zoe Karipidis	Newcastle Jets	(United States) Purdue Boilermakers
16 April 2024	(United States) Kaylie Collins	Western Sydney Wanderers	(United States) Orlando Pride (end of loan)
16 April 2024	(United States) Tori Hansen	Melbourne Victory	(United States) Orlando Pride (end of loan)
17 April 2024	(Denmark) Kathrine Larsen	Western United	(Sweden) Malmö FF
1 May 2024	(United States) Vicky Bruce	Western Sydney Wanderers	(United States) Carolina Ascent
3 May 2024	Natasha Rigby	Perth Glory	Retired
7 May 2024	Gema Simon	Newcastle Jets	Retired
9 May 2024	(New Zealand) Hannah Blake	Adelaide United	Unattached
9 May 2024	Annabel Haffenden	Adelaide United	Unattached
9 May 2024	(United States) Jenna Holtz	Adelaide United	Unattached
9 May 2024	(United States) Mariah Lee	Adelaide United	Unattached
9 May 2024	(New Zealand) Rosetta Taylor	Adelaide United	Unattached
9 May 2024	Grace Wilson	Adelaide United	Unattached
11 May 2024	Emily Shields	Melbourne City	(Australia) Bulleen Lions (end of loan)
14 May 2024	(Netherlands) Maruschka Waldus	Adelaide United	Unattached
17 May 2024	Teigan Collister	Sydney FC	Unattached
17 May 2024	Polly Doran	(England) Crystal Palace	Melbourne Victory (end of loan)
24 May 2024	(United States) Mia Corbin	Brisbane Roar	(United States) Carolina Ascent
28 May 2024	(United States) Sarah Clark	Canberra United	(United States) Spokane Zephyr
28 May 2024	Alexandra Huynh	Newcastle Jets	Retired
30 May 2024	(United States) Hannah Keane	Western United	(United States) Tampa Bay Sun
30 May 2024	Stacey Papadopoulos	Western United	(Scotland) Hibernian
31 May 2024	Chloe Lincoln	Canberra United	Western United
4 June 2024	(New Zealand) Grace Wisnewski	Wellington Phoenix	(United States) Lexington SC
4 June 2024	(United States) Hope Breslin	Wellington Phoenix	(United States) Brooklyn FC
4 June 2024	(United States) Hailey Davidson	Wellington Phoenix	(United States) Dallas Trinity
5 June 2024	Sasha Grove	Canberra United	Western United (Note: Player signed a two-year contract.)
10 June 2024	(New Zealand) Kate Taylor	Wellington Phoenix	(France) Dijon
12 June 2024	(United States) Cannon Clough	Canberra United	(United States) Carolina Ascent
13 June 2024	(New Zealand) Hannah Wilkinson	Melbourne City	Unattached
13 June 2024	(United States) Izzy Nino	Newcastle Jets	(United States) Spokane Zephyr
14 June 2024	Cortnee Vine	Sydney FC	(United States) North Carolina Courage
14 June 2024	Charlotte McLean	Sydney FC	(United States) North Carolina Courage
17 June 2024	(England) Millie Farrow	Perth Glory	Sydney FC
21 June 2024	(New Zealand) Michaela Foster	Wellington Phoenix	(New Zealand) Auckland United
27 June 2024	(Brazil) Bárbara	Melbourne City	Unattached
27 June 2024	(Bosnia and Herzegovina) Emina Ekic	Melbourne City	(United States) Spokane Zephyr
27 June 2024	(United States) Julia Grosso	Melbourne City	(United States) Utah Royals
28 June 2024	(United States) Leah Scarpelli	Brisbane Roar	(United States) Brooklyn FC
30 June 2024	Maia Cameron	Canberra United	Unattached
1 July 2024	Daniela Galic	Melbourne City	(Netherlands) Twente
1 July 2024	Alexia Apostolakis	Western Sydney Wanderers	Melbourne City
1 July 2024	Polly Doran	Melbourne Victory	(Sweden) Linköping
1 July 2024	Anika Stajcic	Perth Glory	(Australia) Football NSW Institute
1 July 2024	Sarah Cain	Perth Glory	Unattached
1 July 2024	Abbey Green	Perth Glory	Unattached
1 July 2024	Clara Hoarau	Perth Glory	Unattached
1 July 2024	Sadie Lawrence	Perth Glory	Unattached
1 July 2024	Tia Stonehill	Perth Glory	Unattached
1 July 2024	Madelyn Whittall	Canberra United	Unattached
1 July 2024	Sophie Nenadovic	Central Coast Mariners	Unattached
3 July 2024	(Venezuela) Mariana Speckmaier	Wellington Phoenix	Melbourne City
9 July 2024	Morgan Aquino	Perth Glory	(United States) DC Power
10 July 2024	(United States) Rola Badawiya	Central Coast Mariners	Unattached
10 July 2024	(United States) Jazmin Wardlow	Central Coast Mariners	Unattached
10 July 2024	(Canada) Rylee Foster	Wellington Phoenix	Unattached
10 July 2024	(Portugal) Carolina Vilão	(Portugal) Benfica	Wellington Phoenix
12 July 2024	Amber Luchtmeijer	(Australia) Macarthur FC	Sydney FC
12 July 2024	(United States) Maliah Morris	Western Sydney Wanderers	Unattached
18 July 2024 (Note: Player was released to free agency before joining new club)	(New Zealand) Brianna Edwards	Wellington Phoenix	Sydney FC
23 July 2024	(United States) Isabel Cox	Wellington Phoenix	(United States) Brooklyn FC
24 July 2024	Alexia Karrys-Stahl	Central Coast Mariners	Unattached
24 July 2024	(Mexico) Briana Woodall	Central Coast Mariners	Unattached
25 July 2024	(Spain) Malena Mieres	(Spain) Real Betis	Melbourne City
28 July 2024	MelindaJ Barbieri	Newcastle Jets	Unattached
28 July 2024	Kiara Rochaix	Newcastle Jets	Unattached
29 July 2024	Emma Ilijoski	Canberra United	(Scotland) Heart of Midlothian
31 July 2024	Emilia Murray	Adelaide United	Melbourne City
2 August 2024	(Philippines) Quinley Quezada	Perth Glory	(Philippines) Manila Digger
4 August 2024	Jamilla Rankin	Melbourne Victory	(Germany) TSG Hoffenheim
6 August 2024	(United States) Gabby Hollar	(Australia) Boroondara-Carey Eagles	Perth Glory
7 August 2024	Jada Whyman	Sydney FC	(Sweden) AIK
8 August 2024	(Singapore) Danelle Tan	(Germany) Borussia Dortmund	Brisbane Roar
8 August 2024	Hana Lowry	Perth Glory	Sydney FC
9 August 2024	(England) Olivia Fergusson	(England) Wolverhampton Wanderers	Wellington Phoenix
9 August 2024	Naomi Chinnama	Melbourne City	Perth Glory
9 August 2024	Ella Abdul-Massih	Western Sydney Wanderers	Perth Glory
9 August 2024	Sarah O'Donoghue	Brisbane Roar	Perth Glory
9 August 2024	(United States) Cariel Ellis	Unattached	Melbourne City
13 August 2024	Ischia Brooking	Western Sydney Wanderers	Perth Glory
13 August 2024	Tijan McKenna	Melbourne City	Perth Glory
14 August 2024	(Nigeria) Onyinyechi Zogg	Unattached	Perth Glory
14 August 2024	(New Zealand) Kelli Brown (Note: Brown spent the off-season at Macarthur Rams)	Wellington Phoenix	Perth Glory
14 August 2024	Zara Kruger	Sydney FC	Brisbane Roar
15 August 2024	(Wales) Megan Wynne	Unattached	Perth Glory
15 August 2024	Matilda McNamara	Unattached	Adelaide United
15 August 2024	Taylor Ray	Sydney FC	Central Coast Mariners
16 August 2024	Ayesha Norrie	Brisbane Roar	Unattached
16 August 2024	Alana Cortellino	(Australia) Bulleen Lions	Western United
20 August 2024	(Philippines) Jaclyn Sawicki	Western United	(Canada) Calgary Wild
20 August 2024	(New Zealand) Marisa van der Meer	Wellington Phoenix	Unattached
20 August 2024	(Bulgaria) Evdokiya Popadinova	(Italy) Lazio	Brisbane Roar
20 August 2024	(New Zealand) Helena Errington	Wellington Phoenix	Unattached
21 August 2024	(Philippines) Sara Eggesvik	Unattached	Western United
21 August 2024	Hollie Palmer	Brisbane Roar	Unattached
21 August 2024	(New Zealand) Ela Jerez	Phoenix Academy	Wellington Phoenix
21 August 2024	(New Zealand) Ella McCann	Phoenix Academy	Wellington Phoenix
21 August 2024	(New Zealand) Ella McMillan	Phoenix Academy	Wellington Phoenix
23 August 2024	(United States) Emily Pringle	(United States) UCLA Bruins	Brisbane Roar
23 August 2024	Sally James	Perth Glory	Canberra United
26 August 2024	Tanaye Morris	(Australia) Adelaide University	Brisbane Roar
26 August 2024	(Japan) Kurea Okino	Melbourne Victory	Unattached
26 August 2024	(Philippines) Sarina Bolden	Newcastle Jets	(Italy) Como
27 August 2024	Alana Jancevski	Adelaide United	Melbourne Victory
27 August 2024	(New Zealand) Grace Jale	Perth Glory	Wellington Phoenix
27 August 2024	Bel Rolley	Unattached	Newcastle Jets
28 August 2024	Nickoletta Flannery	Canberra United	Melbourne Victory
28 August 2024	(China) Wurigumula	Central Coast Mariners	(China) Changchun Dazhong (end of loan)
29 August 2024	Melissa Caceres	Western Sydney Wanderers	TBA
17 August 2024	Sofia Sakalis	Perth Glory	Melbourne Victory
29 August 2024	(Canada) Danielle Krzyzaniak	Unattached	Newcastle Jets
30 August 2024	(England) Ellie Wilson	(England) Wolverhampton Wanderers	Melbourne Victory
30 August 2024	(New Zealand) Claudia Bunge	(Denmark) HB Køge	Melbourne Victory
2 September 2024	Tiarna Karambasis	Central Coast Mariners	Adelaide United
3 September 2024	(United States) Lourdes Bosch	Unattached	Melbourne City
3 September 2024	Isabela Hoyos	(Australia) QAS	Brisbane Roar
6 September 2024	(Japan) Momo Hayashi	(Australia) Gold Coast United	Brisbane Roar
6 September 2024	Natasha Dakic	Western United	Unattached
6 September 2024	Raquel Deralas	Western United	Unattached
6 September 2024	Silver Bell Morris	Western United	Unattached
6 September 2024	Lucy Richards	Western United	Unattached
9 September 2024	(New Zealand) Elizabeth Anton	Perth Glory	Canberra United
11 September 2024	Milly Bennett	(Australia) Football NSW Institute	Western Sydney Wanderers
11 September 2024	Jessica Skinner	(Australia) Football West NTC	Perth Glory
11 September 2024	Miranda Templeman	Melbourne Victory	Perth Glory
11 September 2024	(United States) Cariel Ellis	Melbourne City	Unattached
11 September 2024	(Serbia) Tyla-Jay Vlajnic	Western United	Melbourne City
11 September 2024	Laini Freier	(Australia) Brisbane City	Brisbane Roar
13 September 2024	(England) Faye Bryson	Central Coast Mariners	Sydney FC
13 September 2024	Rubi Sullivan	(Australia) NWS Spirit	Sydney FC
13 September 2024	Amelia Cassar	(Australia) Football NSW Institute	Western Sydney Wanderers
13 September 2024	Aideen Keane	Sydney FC	Canberra United
16 September 2024	Jynaya Dos Santos	Sydney FC	Canberra United
16 September 2024	India Breier	Western Sydney Wanderers	Newcastle Jets
17 September 2024	(United States) Maya McCutcheon	(United States) North Carolina Courage	Wellington Phoenix
17 September 2024	(Colombia) Isabel Dehakiz	(Australia) Bulleen Lions	Western United
17 September 2024	Claudia Mihocic (Note: Mihocic spent the off-season at Bulleen Lions)	Perth Glory	Western United
17 September 2024	Ava Piazza	Canberra United	Newcastle Jets
18 September 2024	Natalie Tathem	Unattached	Perth Glory
19 September 2024	(New Zealand) Michaela Robertson	Wellington Phoenix	Unattached
19 September 2024	(Republic of Ireland) Erin Healy	(Portugal) Clube de Albergaria	Adelaide United
19 September 2024	Chloe Walandouw	Emerging Jets	Newcastle Jets
20 September 2024	Darcey Malone	Sydney FC	Canberra United
20 September 2024	Leia Varley	Melbourne City	Brisbane Roar
20 September 2024	Lauren Keir	Western Sydney Wanderers	Retired
20 September 2024	(England) Jade Pennock	(England) Birmingham City	Central Coast Mariners (loan)
20 September 2024	Mia Green	(Australia) Brisbane City	Newcastle Jets
21 September 2024	(England) Fiona Worts	Sydney FC	Adelaide United
22 September 2024	(England) Brooke Nunn	(Scotland) Hibernian	Central Coast Mariners
23 September 2024	Bethany Gordon	Western Sydney Wanderers	Canberra United
23 September 2024	(Dominican Republic) Lucía León	(England) Watford	Adelaide United
23 September 2024	Bec Kirkup	Brisbane Roar	Unattached
23 September 2024	Jenna McCormick	Brisbane Roar	Unattached
23 September 2024	(Denmark) Hannah Holgersen	Brisbane Roar	Unattached
23 September 2024	Teagan Thompson	Brisbane Roar	Unattached
23 September 2024	Bonnie Davies	Brisbane Roar	Unattached
23 September 2024	Isabella Shuttleworth	Brisbane Roar	Unattached
23 September 2024	Ashlee Brodigan	Brisbane Roar	Unattached
23 September 2024	(New Zealand) Deven Jackson	Canberra United	Newcastle Jets
24 September 2024	Maja Markovski	(Australia) Bulleen Lions	Canberra United
24 September 2024	Elise Kellond-Knight	Melbourne Victory	(Australia) Avondale FC
25 September 2024	Emma Robers	Western United	Canberra United
25 September 2024	Jessika Nash	Melbourne Victory	Central Coast Mariners
26 September 2024	Emily Roach	(Australia) South Melbourne	Western United
26 September 2024	Kyah Simon	Central Coast Mariners	Sydney FC
2 October 2024	Claire Adams	Emerging Jets	Newcastle Jets
2 October 2024	(New Zealand) Lara Wall	(New Zealand) Canterbury United Pride	Wellington Phoenix
2 October 2024	(Colombia) Sandra Ibarguen	(Colombia) Deportivo Pasto	Western United
3 October 2024	(Japan) Mebae Tanaka	(Australia) Preston Lions	Wellington Phoenix
3 October 2024	(England) Abby Clarke	Unattached	Adelaide United
4 October 2024	(United States) Brianne Riley	Unattached	Central Coast Mariners
8 October 2024	Casey Dumont	Central Coast Mariners	Perth Glory
9 October 2024	(Japan) Miku Sunaga	(Australia) Macarthur Rams	Perth Glory
9 October 2024	(Philippines) Jessika Cowart	Perth Glory	(Canada) Vancouver Rise
11 October 2024	Ella Lincoln	(Australia) Perth SC	Perth Glory
11 October 2024	Charli Wainwright	(Australia) Perth SC	Perth Glory
11 October 2024	Sienna Saveska	Sydney FC	Western Sydney Wanderers
11 October 2024	Melina Ayres	Newcastle Jets	Unattached
13 October 2024	Leia Puxty	(Australia) UNSW FC	Central Coast Mariners
13 October 2024	Tiana Fuller	(Australia) Football NSW Institute	Central Coast Mariners
13 October 2024	Lily McMahon	(Australia) Northern Tigers	Central Coast Mariners
14 October 2024	Jaya Bowman	(Australia) Canberra Olympic	Canberra United
14 October 2024	Talia Kapetanellis	(Australia) Sydney University	Western Sydney Wanderers
16 October 2024	(United States) Olivia Sekany	(United States) Racing Louisville	Brisbane Roar (loan)
25 October 2024	Sheridan Gallagher	(Australia) Newcastle Knights (rugby league)	Newcastle Jets
29 October 2024	Ivana Galic	(Australia) O'Connor Knights	Canberra United
29 October 2024	Janet King	(Australia) Canberra Olympic	Canberra United
29 October 2024	Tianah Miro	(Australia) Canberra Olympic	Canberra United
29 October 2024	Paige Hayward	Central Coast Mariners	Western Sydney Wanderers
29 October 2024	Abby Middleton	(Australia) Football SA NTC	Adelaide United
29 October 2024	Ilona Melegh	(Australia) Football SA NTC	Adelaide United
29 October 2024	Erin Kontoutsikos	Adelaide United	Unattached
29 October 2024	Madeleine Wright	Adelaide United	Unattached
29 October 2024	(Canada) Kathryn Harvey	(Turkey) Fatih Vatan Spor	Melbourne City
30 October 2024	(United States) Gia Vicari	(Denmark) Odense Boldklub Q	Newcastle Jets
30 October 2024	(Japan) Ena Harada	(Australia) Bankstown City	Western Sydney Wanderers
31 October 2024	Bronte Trew	(Australia) Macarthur Rams	Western Sydney Wanderers
31 October 2024	Morgan Roberts	(Australia) NWS Spirit	Perth Glory
31 October 2024	(Portugal) Siena Arrarte	Unattached	Western Sydney Wanderers
31 October 2024	Aimee Hall	(Australia) Illawarra Stingrays	Western Sydney Wanderers
31 October 2024	Maya Lobo	Central Coast Mariners	Western Sydney Wanderers
31 October 2024	(Japan) Aya Seino	Unattached	Western Sydney Wanderers
31 October 2024	Teresa Morrissey	(Australia) Macarthur Rams	Central Coast Mariners
31 October 2024	Hannah McNulty	Canberra United	Unattached
2 November 2024	Alexis Collins	Emerging Jets	Newcastle Jets

=== Mid-season ===
Date	Name	Moving from	Moving to
7 November 2024	(Algeria) Imane Chebel	(Brazil) Flamengo	Wellington Phoenix
8 November 2024	(New Zealand) Brooke Neary	Phoenix Academy	Wellington Phoenix
13 November 2024	Ally Boertje	Unattached	Newcastle Jets
21 November 2024	(Algeria) Imane Chebel	Wellington Phoenix	Unattached
21 November 2024	(United States) Alivia Kelly	(United States) NC State Wolfpack	Wellington Phoenix
29 November 2024	(United States) Madison Ayson	(United States) Houston Dash	Canberra United
12 December 2024	(Republic of Ireland) Sarah Rowe	(Australia) Collingwood (AFLW)	Central Coast Mariners
13 December 2024	Claudia Valletta	Unattached	Perth Glory
20 December 2024	(New Zealand) Amelia Abbott	(United States) Texas Longhorns	Wellington Phoenix
24 December 2024	Lara Kirkby	(United States) Maine Black Bears	Adelaide United
27 December 2024	Greta Kraszula	(United States) VCU Rams	Central Coast Mariners
28 December 2024	Beattie Goad	Melbourne Victory	Retired
30 December 2024	(United States) Brianne Riley	Central Coast Mariners	Unattached
10 January 2025	Caitlin Doeglas	Unattached	Perth Glory
24 January 2025	Holly Furphy	Unattached	Melbourne Victory
26 January 2025	Jessica Seaman	Unattached	Central Coast Mariners
27 January 2025	Ava Piazza	Newcastle Jets	(Portugal) Albergaria
1 February 2025	Anika Stajcic	(Australia) Football NSW Institute	Western Sydney Wanderers
7 February 2025	Beth Mason-Jones	Unattached	Sydney FC
15 February 2025	Caitlin Doeglas	Perth Glory	Unattached
25 February 2025	Kahli Johnson	Western United	(Canada) Calgary Wild
28 February 2025	Hollie Palmer	Unattached	Perth Glory
28 February 2025	Amali Kinsella	(Australia) QAS	Brisbane Roar
11 March 2025	(United States) Olivia Sekany	Brisbane Roar	(United States) Racing Louisville (end of loan)
15 March 2025	(United States) Anneka Lewerenz	(Australia) Sunshine Coast Wanderers	Brisbane Roar
26 March 2025	(New Zealand) Elizabeth Anton	Canberra United	(Norway) Kolbotn

== Re-signings ==
Date	Name	Club
15 March 2024	Holly Caspers (Note: Player signed a two-year extension.)	Western Sydney Wanderers
21 March 2024	Natalie Tobin	Sydney FC
22 March 2024	Cushla Rue	Western Sydney Wanderers
9 April 2024	Alana Cerne	Western United
18 April 2024	Abbey Lemon	Sydney FC
19 April 2024	Danika Matos	Western Sydney Wanderers
24 April 2024	Margaux Chauvet	Sydney FC
29 April 2024	Olivia Price	Western Sydney Wanderers
14 May 2024	Mackenzie Hawkesby	Sydney FC
23 May 2024	Sophie Harding	Western Sydney Wanderers
29 May 2024	Kahli Johnson	Western United
31 May 2024	(New Zealand) Rebecca Lake	Wellington Phoenix
10 June 2024	(New Zealand) Marisa van deer Meer	Wellington Phoenix
11 June 2024	Kirsty Fenton	Sydney FC
13 June 2024	Gemma Ferris	Western Sydney Wanderers
14 June 2024	(United States) Taylor Otto	Melbourne City
18 June 2024	(United States) Jordan Thompson	Sydney FC
20 June 2024	Princess Ibini	Sydney FC
3 July 2024	(New Zealand) Emma Main	Wellington Phoenix
5 July 2024	(Lebanon) Tiana Jaber	Wellington Phoenix
5 July 2024	Cassidy Davis	Newcastle Jets
8 July 2024	Emma Dundas	Newcastle Jets
9 July 2024	Claudia Cicco	Newcastle Jets
9 July 2024	Melina Ayres	Newcastle Jets
9 July 2024	(Philippines) Sarina Bolden	Newcastle Jets
11 July 2024	(New Zealand) Alyssa Whinham	Wellington Phoenix
17 July 2024	Bryleeh Henry	Melbourne City
17 July 2024	Laura Hughes	Melbourne City
17 July 2024	Karly Roestbakken	Melbourne City
17 July 2024	Sophie Hoban	Newcastle Jets
18 July 2024	Jasmine Black	Sydney FC
19 July 2024	Ella Buchanan	Western Sydney Wanderers
22 July 2024	Amy Harrison	Western Sydney Wanderers
25 July 2024	Natasha Prior	Newcastle Jets
28 July 2024	Milan Hammond	Newcastle Jets
31 July 2024	(United States) Shea Connors	Sydney FC
7 August 2024	Shelby McMahon (Note: Player signed a three-year extension.)	Melbourne City
7 August 2024	(Philippines) Jessika Cowart	Perth Glory
7 August 2024	Susan Phonsongkham	Perth Glory
7 August 2024	Sharn Freier	Brisbane Roar
12 August 2024	Mischa Anderson	Perth Glory
12 August 2024	Isabella Foletta	Perth Glory
12 August 2024	Grace Johnston	Perth Glory
12 August 2024	Isabella Wallhead	Perth Glory
12 August 2024	Keeley Richards	Brisbane Roar
12 August 2024	Adriana Taranto	Western United
12 August 2024	Melissa Taranto	Western United
13 August 2024	Julia Sardo	Western United
13 August 2024	Georgia Cassidy	Perth Glory
14 August 2024	Alyssa Dall'Oste	Western United
14 August 2024	Natalie Picak	Western United
14 August 2024	Tanika Lala	Perth Glory
15 August 2024	Aimee Medwin	Western United
16 August 2024	Annalise Rasmussen	Central Coast Mariners
16 August 2024	Katie Bowler	Adelaide United
16 August 2024	Sarah Morgan	Adelaide United
16 August 2024	Meleri Mullan	Adelaide United
16 August 2024	Zoe Tolland	Adelaide United
17 August 2024	Ash Irwin	Central Coast Mariners
19 August 2024	Isabel Gomez	Central Coast Mariners
21 August 2024	Talia Younis	Western Sydney Wanderers
21 August 2024	(New Zealand) Aimee Danieli	Wellington Phoenix
24 August 2024	Coco Majstorovic	Canberra United
26 August 2024	Georgia Ritchie	Canberra United
26 August 2024	Courtney Newbon	Melbourne Victory
26 August 2024	Laura Pickett	Melbourne Victory
26 August 2024	Rosie Curtis	Melbourne Victory
26 August 2024	Rachel Lowe	Melbourne Victory
26 August 2024	(United States) Sara D'Appolonia	Melbourne Victory
26 August 2024	Alana Murphy	Melbourne Victory
26 August 2024	Paige Zois	Melbourne Victory
26 August 2024	Emily Gielnik	Melbourne Victory
26 August 2024	Ella O'Grady	Melbourne Victory
26 August 2024	Ava Briedis	Melbourne Victory
26 August 2024	Beattie Goad	Melbourne Victory
26 August 2024	Lia Privitelli	Melbourne Victory
28 August 2024	(New Zealand) Ruby Nathan	Canberra United
28 August 2024	Libby Copus-Brown	Newcastle Jets
28 August 2024	Alicia Woods	Brisbane Roar
29 August 2024	Ella Tonkin	Adelaide United
29 August 2024	Peta Trimis	Central Coast Mariners
30 August 2024	Hayley Taylor-Young	Canberra United
2 September 2024	Sofia Christopherson	Canberra United
2 September 2024	Holly McQueen	Brisbane Roar
3 September 2024	Tiahna Robertson	Newcastle Jets
3 September 2024	Annalee Grove	Adelaide United
3 September 2024	Claudia Jenkins	Adelaide United
3 September 2024	Grace Maher	Western United
4 September 2024	Michelle Heyman	Canberra United
4 September 2024	(Switzerland) Lorena Baumann	Newcastle Jets
4 September 2024	Avaani Prakash	Western United
5 September 2024	(Japan) Nanako Sasaki	Adelaide United
6 September 2024	Holly Murray	Canberra United
9 September 2024	Emily Condon	Adelaide United
10 September 2024	(Republic of Ireland) Deborah-Anne De la Harpe	Brisbane Roar
11 September 2024	Mary Stanic-Floody	Canberra United
12 September 2024	Chloe Logarzo	Western United
13 September 2024	Josie Wilson	Newcastle Jets
18 September 2024	Tegan Bertolissio	Canberra United
19 September 2024	(New Zealand) Annalie Longo	Wellington Phoenix
19 September 2024	Josie Allan	Newcastle Jets
21 September 2024	Chelsie Dawber	Adelaide United
22 September 2024	Alex McKenzie	Canberra United
22 September 2024	Kiara De Domizio	Western United
22 September 2024	(Japan) Keiwa Hieda	Western United
23 September 2024	Chelsea Blissett	Brisbane Roar
23 September 2024	Emma Gibbon	Brisbane Roar
23 September 2024	(Brazil) Mariel Hecher (Note: Hecher spent the off-season at Lions FC.)	Brisbane Roar
23 September 2024	(United States) Catherine Zimmerman	Western United
24 September 2024	Melissa Barbieri	Melbourne City
24 September 2024	Lucy Johnson	Sydney FC
24 September 2024	Lara Gooch	Newcastle Jets
26 September 2024	Isabella Accardo	Melbourne City
26 September 2024	Caitlin Karic	Melbourne City
28 September 2024	Taren King	Central Coast Mariners
29 September 2024	Chloe Carmichael	Central Coast Mariners
30 September 2024	Caley Tallon-Henniker	Sydney FC
1 October 2024	Lillian Skelly	Canberra United
2 October 2024	Isabel Hodgson	Adelaide United
12 October 2024	Shadeene Evans	Central Coast Mariners
12 October 2024	Tess Quilligan	Central Coast Mariners
23 October 2024	Annabel Martin	Central Coast Mariners
29 October 2024	Miley Grigg	Adelaide United
29 October 2024	Sian Dewey	Adelaide United
29 October 2024	Chrissy Panagaris	Adelaide United
31 October 2024	Sham Khamis	Western Sydney Wanderers
7 November 2024	Geo Candy	Melbourne Victory
13 January 2025	Indiana dos Santos (Note: Player signed an extension for next season.)	Sydney FC
3 February 2025	Grace Kuilamu	Brisbane Roar
4 February 2025	Laini Freier	Brisbane Roar
10 February 2025	Leia Varley	Brisbane Roar
25 February 2025	(Japan) Momo Hayashi	Brisbane Roar
12 March 2025	Isabela Hoyos	Brisbane Roar
13 March 2025	Ruby Cuthbert	Brisbane Roar
24 March 2025	(United States) Emily Pringle	Brisbane Roar
27 March 2025	(United States) Kayla Morrison	Melbourne Victory
