= 2024–25 Brisbane Roar FC (women) season =

Brisbane Roar (women)
2024–25 season
- Chairman: Kaz Patafta
- Head Coach: Alex Smith
- Stadium: Ballymore Stadium; Perry Park
- A-League Women: 7th
- Top goalscorer: Tameka Yallop (12)
- Highest home attendance: 1,856 vs. Sydney FC (9 November 2024); A-League Women
- Lowest home attendance: 1,588 vs. Perth Glory (15 November 2024); A-League Women
- Average home league attendance: 1,722
- Biggest win: 4–0 vs. Western Sydney Wanderers (N) (22 November 2024); A-League Women
- Biggest defeat: 2–3 vs. Canberra United (A) (2 November 2024); A-League Women; 1–2 vs. Wellington Phoenix (A) (8 December 2024); A-League Women
Home colours	Away colours	Third colours
- All statistics correct as of 15 December 2024.

The 2024–25 season was Brisbane Roar Football Club (women)'s 17th season in the A-League Women.

== Players ==
=== First-team squad ===
As of 15 March 2025

Note: Flags indicate national team as defined under FIFA eligibility rules; some limited exceptions apply. Players may hold more than one non-FIFA nationality.

No.	Pos.	Nation	Player
1	GK	AUS	Keeley Richards
2	DF	AUS	Leia Varley
3	DF	IRL	Deborah-Anne De la Harpe
4	MF	AUS	Kijah Stephenson
5	DF	AUS	Amali Kinsella (injury replacement)
6	DF	AUS	Holly McQueen
7	MF	JPN	Momo Hayashi
8	FW	BRA	Mariel Hecher (vice-captain)
9	FW	SGP	Danelle Tan
10	FW	AUS	Grace Kuilamu (scholarship)
11	FW	AUS	Sharn Freier
12	FW	AUS	Tamar Levin

No.	Pos.	Nation	Player
13	MF	AUS	Tameka Yallop (captain)
14	MF	AUS	Zara Kruger
16	DF	AUS	Chelsea Blissett
17	FW	BUL	Evdokia Popadinova
18	DF	USA	Emily Pringle
19	MF	AUS	Laini Freier
20	FW	AUS	Tanaye Morris
22	DF	AUS	Ruby Cuthbert
23	DF	AUS	Isabela Hoyos (scholarship)
32	MF	AUS	Alicia Woods
99	GK	AUS	Emma Gibbon
—	GK	USA	Anneka Lewerenz

== Transfers ==
=== Transfers in ===
No.	Position	Player	From	Type/fee	Contract length	Date	Ref
9	FW	(Singapore) Danelle Tan	(Germany) Borussia Dortmund	Free transfer	1 year	8 August 2024	
14	MF	Zara Kruger	Unattached	Free transfer	1 year	14 August 2024	
17	FW	(Bulgaria) Evdokiya Popadinova	(Italy) Lazio	Free transfer	1 year	20 August 2024	
18	DF	(United States) Emily Pringle	(United States) UCLA Bruins	Free transfer	1 year	23 August 2024	
20	FW	Tanaye Morris	(Australia) Adelaide University	Free transfer	1 year	26 August 2024	
23	DF	Isabela Hoyos	(Australia) QAS	Free transfer	1 year (scholarship)	3 September 2024	
7	DF	(Japan) Momo Hayashi	(Australia) Gold Coast United	Free transfer	1 year	6 September 2024	
19	MF	Laini Freier	(Australia) Brisbane City	Free transfer	1 year	11 September 2024	
2	DF	Leia Varley	Unattached	Free transfer	1 year	20 September 2024	
33	GK	(United States) Olivia Sekany	(United States) Racing Louisville	Loan	5 months	16 October 2024	
5	DF	Amali Kinsella	(Australia) QAS	Injury replacement		28 February 2025	
	GK	(United States) Anneka Lewerenz	(Australia) Sunshine Coast Wanderers	Free transfer	4 months	15 March 2025	

=== Transfers out ===
No.	Position	Player	Transferred to	Type/fee	Date	Ref
9	FW	(United States) Mia Corbin	(United States) Carolina Ascent	End of contract	24 May 2024	
17	DF	(United States) Leah Scarpelli	(United States) Brooklyn FC	End of contract	28 June 2024	
14	MF	Sarah O'Donoghue	Perth Glory	End of contract	9 August 2024	
7	MF	Ayesha Norrie	Unattached	End of contract	16 August 2024	
19	DF	Hollie Palmer	Unattached	End of contract	21 August 2024	
2	MF	Bec Kirkup	Unattached	End of contract	23 September 2024	
5	DF	Jenna McCormick	Unattached	End of contract	23 September 2024	
15	FW	(Denmark) Hannah Holgersen	Unattached	End of contract	23 September 2024	
18	DF	Teagan Thompson	Unattached	End of contract	23 September 2024	
20	FW	Bonnie Davies	Unattached	End of contract	23 September 2024	
21	GK	Isabella Shuttleworth	Unattached	End of contract	23 September 2024	
23	FW	Ashlee Brodigan	Unattached	End of contract	23 September 2024	
33	GK	(United States) Olivia Sekany	(United States) Racing Louisville	End of loan	11 March 2025	

=== Contract extensions ===
No.	Player	Position	Duration	Date	Ref.
11	Sharn Freier	Forward	2 years	7 August 2024	New contract replacing previous multi-year contract signed in September 2023
1	Keeley Richards	Goalkeeper	1 year	12 August 2024	
32	Alicia Woods	Midfielder	1 year	28 August 2024	
6	Holly McQueen	Defender	1 year	2 September 2024	
3	(Republic of Ireland) Deborah-Anne De la Harpe	Defender	1 year	10 September 2024	
8	(Brazil) Mariel Hecher	Forward	1 year	23 September 2024	
16	Chelsea Blissett	Defender	1 year	23 September 2024	
99	Emma Gibbon	Goalkeeper	1 year	23 September 2024	
10	Grace Kuilamu	Forward	1 year	3 February 2025	Contract extended from end of 2024–25 to end of 2025–26
19	Laini Freier	Midfielder	2 years	4 February 2025	Contract extended from end of 2024–25 to end of 2026–27
2	Leia Varley	Central defender	2 years	10 February 2025	Contract extended from end of 2024–25 to end of 2026–27
7	(Japan) Momo Hayashi	Midfielder	1 year	25 February 2025	Contract extended from end of 2024–25 to end of 2025–26
23	Isabela Hoyos	Defender	3 years	12 March 2025	Contract extended from end of 2024–25 to end of 2027–28
22	Ruby Cuthbert	Central defender	2 years	13 March 2025	New 2-year contract, replacing previous contract which was until end of 2025–26
18	(United States) Emily Pringle	Defender	1 year	24 March 2025	Contract extended from end of 2024–25 to end of 2025–26

== Pre-season and friendlies ==
5 October 2024	Queensland State Team (Australia)	3–2	(Australia) Brisbane Roar	Logan, Australia
14:30 AEST	Cuthbert 2' (o.g.); Latham 9'; Hanson 36'	Report	Kinsella 85', 90+2'	Stadium: Meakin Park

4 April 2025	Singapore Premier League All Stars	1–7	(Australia) Brisbane Roar	Bishan, Singapore
20:00 SST	McQueen 6' (o.g.)	Report	Popadinova 3' (?); Levin (?), 62'; Brown 57'; Tan (?); Pringle 85'	Stadium: Bishan Stadium; Attendance: 2,108

== Competitions ==
=== Overall record ===
Competition	First match	Last match	Final position	Record							
Competition	First match	Last match	Final position	Pld	W	D	L	GF	GA	GD	Win %
A-League Women	2 November 2024	19 April 2025	7th	23	8	2	13	46	42	+4	34.78
Total				23	8	2	13	46	42	+4	34.78

Last updated: 19 April 2025
Source: Competitions

=== A-League Women ===
==== League table ====
Pos	Team	Pld	W	D	L	GF	GA	GD	Pts	Qualification
5	Canberra United	23	9	6	8	28	31	−3	33	Qualification for Finals series
6	Western United	23	9	6	8	39	46	−7	33	Qualification for Finals series
7	Brisbane Roar	23	8	2	13	46	42	+4	26	
8	Sydney FC	23	7	4	12	23	29	−6	25	
9	Wellington Phoenix (Note: Wellington Phoenix cannot qualify for the AFC Women's Champions League as they are based in New Zealand, which is part of the Oceania Football Confederation.)	23	7	3	13	25	30	−5	24	

Source: A-Leagues
Rules for classification: 1) points; 2) goal difference; 3) goals scored; 4) wins; 5) head-to-head results; 5a) head-to-head points; 5b) head-to-head goal difference; 6) Fair Play points; 7) away goal difference; 8) away goals per match; 9) home goal difference; 10) home goals per match; 11) toss of a coin in an event of a tie of two clubs.

==== Results summary ====
Overall								Home						Away					
Pld	W	D	L	GF	GA	GD	Pts	W	D	L	GF	GA	GD	W	D	L	GF	GA	GD
23	8	2	13	46	42	+4	26	5	2	4	18	17	+1	3	0	9	28	25	+3

Last updated: 19 April 2025.
Source: Soccerway
Away figures include Brisbane Roar's 4–0 win on neutral ground in Unite Round against Western Sydney Wanderers on 22 November 2024.

==== Results by round ====
Round	1	2	3	4	5	6	7	8	10	9	11	12	13	14	15	16	17	19	20	18	21	22	23
Ground	A	H	H	N	A	H	A	A	H	H	A	H	A	H	A	H	A	H	H	A	A	H	A
Result	L	W	W	W	L	W	W	W	L	W	L	L	L	W	L	D	L	L	L	L	L	D	L
Position	9	7	4	1	3	2	2	2	2	2	2	4	4	4	5	5	5	5	6	6	7	7	7
Points	0	3	6	9	9	12	15	18	18	21	21	21	21	24	24	25	25	25	25	25	25	26	26

Updated to match(es) played on 20 April 2025. Source: Soccerway
A = Away; H = Home; N = Neutral; W = Win; D = Draw; L = Loss

==== Matches ====
Win Draw Loss

All times are local time (AEST).

2 November 2024 1	Canberra United	3–2	Brisbane Roar	Canberra
15:00	Markovski 15', 56'; Stanic-Floody 31'	Report	Popadinova 50'; De la Harpe 89'	Stadium: McKellar Park; Attendance: 1,180; Referee: Rachael Mitchenson

9 November 2024 2	Brisbane Roar	1–0	Sydney FC	Brisbane
15:00	Blissett 48'	Report		Stadium: Perry Park; Attendance: 1,856; Referee: Rebecca Durcau

15 November 2024 3	Brisbane Roar	3–0	Perth Glory	Brisbane
18:00	Yallop 7', 59' (pen.); Levin 13'	Report		Stadium: Perry Park; Attendance: 1,588; Referee: Georgia Ghirardello

22 November 2024 4	Western Sydney Wanderers	0–4	Brisbane Roar	Sydney
19:15		Report	Hayashi 18', 45+1'; Yallop 67'; Pringle 84'	Stadium: Netstrata Jubilee Stadium (Note: Match moved from Leichhardt Oval following a pitch assessment.); Attendance: 1,398; Referee: Kelly Jones

8 December 2024 5	Wellington Phoenix	2–1	Brisbane Roar	Wellington
13:00	Longo 34', 69'	Report	Pringle 46'	Stadium: Porirua Park; Attendance: 503; Referee: Rachael Mitchenson

15 December 2024 6	Brisbane Roar	2–1	Central Coast Mariners	Brisbane
17:00	De la Harpe 57'; Yallop 80'	Report	Fuller 76'	Stadium: Perry Park; Attendance: 751; Referee: Isabella Mossin
Note: Match originally scheduled for 14 December, but postponed due to wet weather. It was rescheduled for 15 December.

21 December 2024 7	Newcastle Jets	1–6	Brisbane Roar	Maitland
16:00	Davis 32'	Report	Kuilamu 2'; Levin 34'; L. Freier 42', 69', 72'; Hayashi 49'	Stadium: Maitland Sportsground; Attendance: 1,616; Referee: Georgia Ghirardello

29 December 2024 8	Western United	2–8	Brisbane Roar	Melbourne
18:45	Logarzo 30' (pen.); McQueen 73' (o.g.)	Report	S. Freier 9', 53'; Hayashi 17'; L. Freier 26', 48', 61'; Varley 32'; Yallop 70'	Stadium: Ironbark Fields; Attendance: 907; Referee: Caitlin Williams

4 January 2025 10	Brisbane Roar	1–2	Canberra United	Brisbane
17:00	L. Freier 72'	Report	Robers 81'; Heyman 88'	Stadium: Perry Park; Attendance: 3,612; Referee: Rebecca Durcau

8 January 2025 9	Brisbane Roar	2–0	Melbourne Victory	Brisbane
18:00	Kuilamu 22', 37'	Report		Stadium: Perry Park; Attendance: 2,965; Referee: Bec Mackie

11 January 2025 11	Melbourne City	2–0	Brisbane Roar	Melbourne
18:45	McKenna 5', 9'	Report		Stadium: AAMI Park; Attendance: 2,340; Referee: Georgia Ghirardello

19 January 2025 12	Brisbane Roar	2–3	Adelaide United	Brisbane
17:00	Woods 45'; Yallop 90+3'	Report	Dawber 42', 71'; Healy 47'	Stadium: Perry Park; Attendance: 3,712; Referee: Page Malau-Aduli

26 January 2025 13	Perth Glory	3–2	Brisbane Roar	Perth
19:00	Doeglas 29', 34'; Abdul-Massih 90+3'	Report	Yallop 5'; Kuilamu 31'	Stadium: Sam Kerr Football Centre; Attendance: 1,044; Referee: Isabella Mossin

2 February 2025 14	Brisbane Roar	1–0	Wellington Phoenix	Brisbane
17:00	Kuilamu 62'	Report		Stadium: Perry Park; Attendance: 2,866; Referee: Molly Godsell

9 February 2025 15	Western Sydney Wanderers	2–1	Brisbane Roar	Sydney
16:00	Saveska 7'; Caspers 88'	Report	Kruger 67'	Stadium: Wanderers Football Park; Attendance: 729; Referee: Georgia Ghirardello

16 February 2025 16	Brisbane Roar	0–0	Western United	Brisbane
17:00		Report		Stadium: Perry Park; Attendance: 2,356; Referee: Georgia Ghirardello

2 March 2025 17	Sydney FC	3–2	Brisbane Roar	Sydney
16:00	Hawkesby 13'; Tobin 67'; Connors 72'	Report	L. Freier 49'; Hecher 61'	Stadium: Leichhardt Oval; Referee: Caitlin Williams

16 March 2025 19	Brisbane Roar	2–3	Newcastle Jets	Brisbane
17:30	Yallop 7', 19'	Report	Dundas 17'; Jackson 49'; L. Allan 90+5'	Stadium: Perry Park; Attendance: 2,548; Referee: Isabella Mossin

23 March 2025 20	Adelaide United	3–1	Brisbane Roar	Adelaide
16:30	Worts 64', 86'; Dawber 90' (pen.)	Report	Hecher 52'	Stadium: Marden Sports Complex; Referee: Mikayla Ryan

26 March 2025 18	Brisbane Roar	0–4	Melbourne City	Brisbane
18:00 AEST		Report	Otto 9'; McNamara 70'; Henry 89'; Speckmaier 90+5'	Stadium: Perry Park; Attendance: 1,174; Referee: Rachael Mitchenson
Note: Match originally scheduled for 9 March, but rescheduled due to the impacts from Cyclone Alfred.

30 March 2025 21	Central Coast Mariners	2–1	Brisbane Roar	Gosford
16:45	Gomez 22'; Rasmussen 71'	Report	L. Freier 1'	Stadium: Industree Group Stadium; Referee: Isabella Mossin

13 April 2025 22	Brisbane Roar	4–4	Western Sydney Wanderers	Brisbane
15:00	Yallop 16', 29', 85'; Hayashi 68'	Report	Trew 37'; Caspers 73'; McComasky 85'; Harding 90+2'	Stadium: Perry Park; Attendance: 2,355; Referee: Molly Godsell

19 April 2025 23	Melbourne Victory	2–0	Brisbane Roar	Melbourne
14:15	Flannery 43'; Chidiac 54'	Report		Stadium: AAMI Park; Attendance: 1,740; Referee: Izzy Cooper

== Statistics ==
=== Appearances and goals ===
Includes all competitions. Players with no appearances not included in the list.

As of match played 19 April 2025

No.	Pos	Nat	Player	Total		A-League Women	
No.	Pos	Nat	Player	Apps	Goals	Apps	Goals
1	GK	(Australia) AUS	Keeley Richards	7	0	6+1	0
2	DF	(Australia) AUS	Leia Varley	18	1	17+1	1
3	DF	(Republic of Ireland) IRL	Deborah-Anne De la Harpe	23	2	21+2	2
5	DF	(Australia) AUS	Amali Kinsella	1	0	1	0
6	DF	(Australia) AUS	Holly McQueen	22	0	21+1	0
7	MF	(Japan) JPN	Momo Hayashi	18	5	17+1	5
8	FW	(Brazil) BRA	Mariel Hecher	19	2	6+13	2
9	FW	(Singapore) SGP	Danelle Tan	3	0	0+3	0
10	FW	(Australia) AUS	Grace Kuilamu	18	5	11+7	5
11	FW	(Australia) AUS	Sharn Freier	11	2	10+1	2
12	MF	(Australia) AUS	Tamar Levin	10	2	7+3	2
13	MF	(Australia) AUS	Tameka Yallop	19	12	19	12
14	MF	(Australia) AUS	Zara Kruger	20	1	10+10	1
16	DF	(Australia) AUS	Chelsea Blissett	20	1	20	1
17	FW	(Bulgaria) BUL	Evdokiya Popadinova	18	1	13+5	1
18	DF	(United States) USA	Emily Pringle	23	2	14+9	2
19	FW	(Australia) AUS	Laini Freier	17	9	15+2	9
20	FW	(Australia) AUS	Tanaye Morris	10	0	0+10	0
22	DF	(Australia) AUS	Ruby Cuthbert	3	0	0+3	0
23	DF	(Australia) AUS	Isabela Hoyos	11	0	7+4	0
32	MF	(Australia) AUS	Alicia Woods	23	1	21+2	1
33	GK	(United States) USA	Olivia Sekany	17	0	17	0

=== Disciplinary record ===
Includes all competitions. The list is sorted by squad number when total cards are equal. Players with no cards not included in the list.

As of match played 15 December 2024

Rank	No.	Pos.	Nat.	Name	A-League Women			Total							
Rank	No.	Pos.	Nat.	Name	Yellow card	(yellow card) (yellow-red card)	Red card	Yellow card	(yellow card) (yellow-red card)	Red card					
Rank	No.	Pos.	Nat.	Name	1	16	DF	(Australia)	Chelsea Blissett	1	0	0	1	0	0
17	FW	(Bulgaria)	Evdokiya Popadiynova	1	1	0	0	1	0	0					
18	DF	(United States)	Emily Pringle	1	1	0	0	1	0	0					
32	MF	(Australia)	Alicia Woods	1	1	0	0	1	0	0					
Total					4	0	0	4	0	0					

=== Clean sheets ===
Includes all competitions. The list is sorted by squad number when total clean sheets are equal. Numbers in parentheses represent games where both goalkeepers participated and both kept a clean sheet; the number in parentheses is awarded to the goalkeeper who was substituted on, whilst a full clean sheet is awarded to the goalkeeper who was on the field at the start of play. Goalkeepers with no clean sheets not included in the list.

As of match played 19 April 2025

Rank	No.	Nat.	Goalkeeper	A-League Women	Total
1	33	(United States)	Olivia Sekany	6	6

== See also ==
- 2024–25 Brisbane Roar FC season
