= 2025–26 Brisbane Roar FC (women) season =

Brisbane Roar (women)
2025–26 season
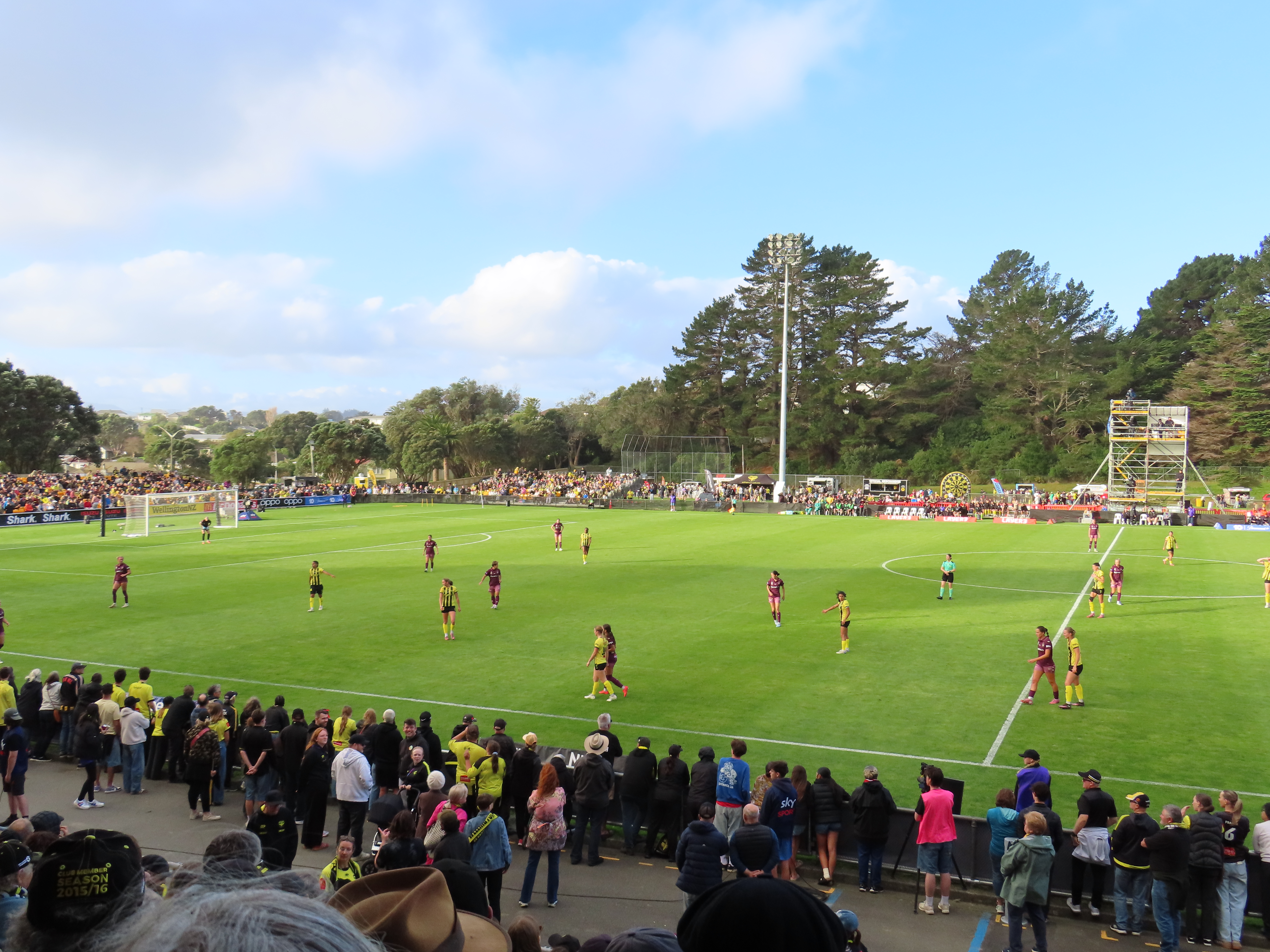
- Semifinal match between the Roar and the Wellington Phoenix on 10 May 2026.
- Chairman: Kaz Patafta
- Head Coach: Alex Smith
- Stadium: Imperial Corp Stadium
- A-League Women: 4th
- A-League Women Finals: Semi-final
- Top goalscorer: League: Bente Jansen (8); All: Bente Jansen (8)
Home colours	Away colours	Third colours
- All statistics correct as of 25 January 2026.

The 2025–26 season was Brisbane Roar Football Club (women)'s 18th season in the A-League Women.

== Players ==
=== First-team squad ===
As of 6 February 2026

Note: Flags indicate national team as defined under FIFA eligibility rules; some limited exceptions apply. Players may hold more than one non-FIFA nationality.

No.	Pos.	Nation	Player
1	GK	AUS	Chloe Lincoln
2	DF	PHI	Angela Beard
3	FW	AUS	Daisy Brown (scholarship)
4	FW	AUS	Kijah Stephenson
5	DF	AUS	Aimee Medwin
6	DF	AUS	Ruby Cuthbert
7	MF	JPN	Momo Hayashi
8	DF	USA	Josie Studer
10	FW	AUS	Grace Kuilamu (scholarship)
11	DF	USA	Marianna Seidl
12	GK	AUS	Tahlia Franco

No.	Pos.	Nation	Player
13	MF	AUS	Tameka Yallop (captain)
14	MF	AUS	Zara Kruger
15	MF	AUS	Kiera Meyers
17	FW	NED	Bente Jansen
18	DF	AUS	Amali Kinsella (scholarship)
22	DF	AUS	Ava Piazza
23	DF	AUS	Isabela Hoyos (scholarship)
24	FW	AUS	Sharn Freier (on loan from VfL Wolfsburg)
27	FW	USA	Ashlyn Miller
32	MF	AUS	Alicia Woods
47	FW	AUS	Kyla Hanson

== Transfers ==
=== Transfers in ===
No.	Position	Player	From	Type/fee	Contract length	Date	Ref
1	GK	Chloe Lincoln	Western United	Free transfer	1 year	10 June 2025	
3	FW	Daisy Brown	(Australia) QAS	Free transfer	2 years (scholarship)	30 July 2025	
22	DF	Ava Piazza	(Armenia) Pyunik	Free transfer	1 year	15 August 2025	
15	MF	Kiera Meyers	Melbourne City	Free transfer	1 year	4 September 2025	
12	GK	Tahlia Franco	Unattached	Free transfer	1 year	5 September 2025	
27	FW	(United States) Ashlyn Miller	(United States) Texas Longhorns	Free transfer	1 year	8 September 2025	
47	FW	Kyla Hanson	(Australia) Eastern Suburbs	Free transfer	1 year	9 September 2025	
17	FW	(Netherlands) Bente Jansen	(Netherlands) Ajax	Free transfer	1 year	10 September 2025	
24	FW	Sharn Freier	(Germany) VfL Wolfsburg	Loan	1 year	17 September 2025	
11	DF	(United States) Marianna Seidl	(Czech Republic) Slavia Prague	Free transfer	1 year	26 September 2025	
8	DF	(United States) Josie Studer	(United States) Carolina Ascent	Free transfer	1 year	29 September 2025	
5	DF	Aimee Medwin	Unattached	Free transfer	1 year	14 October 2025	
2	DF	(Philippines) Angela Beard	Unattached	Free transfer	5 months	6 February 2026	

=== Transfers out ===
No.	Position	Player	Transferred to	Type/fee	Date	Ref
11	FW	Sharn Freier	(Germany) VfL Wolfsburg	Undisclosed	21 January 2025	
1	GK	Keeley Richards	Retired		17 April 2025	
8	FW	(Brazil) Mariel Hecher	Retired		17 April 2025	
9	FW	(Singapore) Danelle Tan	Unattached	End of contract	28 May 2025	
12	FW	Tamar Levin	Unattached	End of contract	28 May 2025	
17	FW	(Bulgaria) Evdokia Popadinova	Unattached	End of contract	28 May 2025	
20	FW	Tanaye Morris	Unattached	End of contract	28 May 2025	
	GK	(United States) Anneka Lewerenz	Unattached	End of contract	28 May 2025	
6	DF	Holly McQueen	Unattached	End of contract	26 June 2025	
16	DF	Chelsea Blissett	Unattached	End of contract	26 June 2025	
18	DF	(United States) Emily Pringle	(United States) Brooklyn FC	Player exercised option to sign overseas	9 August 2025	
3	DF	(Republic of Ireland) Deborah-Anne De la Harpe	(Sweden) Norrköping	End of contract	13 August 2025	
99	GK	Emma Gibbon	Unattached	End of contract	20 August 2025	
19	MF	Laini Freier	Retired		22 August 2025	
2	DF	Leia Varley	(Germany) Nürnberg	Undisclosed	3 February 2026	

=== Contract extensions ===
No.	Player	Position	Duration	Date	Ref.
18	Amali Kinsella	Defender	2 years (scholarship)	25 July 2025	
14	Zara Kruger	Midfielder		25 July 2025	
32	Alicia Woods	Midfielder		25 July 2025	
13	Tameka Yallop	Midfielder	1 year	1 September 2025	
4	Kijah Stephenson	Forward	1 year	3 September 2025	

== Pre-season and friendlies ==
30 September 2025	Queensland State Team (Australia)	2–2	(Australia) Brisbane Roar	Brisbane, Australia
19:30 AEST	Withers 47'; Hirakawa 49'	Report	Freier 55'; Jansen 75'	Stadium: Imperial Corp Stadium

4 October 2025	Caboolture Sports (Australia)	0–6	(Australia) Brisbane Roar	Caboolture, Australia
TBC AEST		Report	Hayashi 20'; Jansen 37'; Meyers 38', 39'; Hanson 42'; Stephenson 56'	Stadium: Caboolture Sports Complex

11 October 2025	Olympic FC (Australia)	0–5	(Australia) Brisbane Roar	Brisbane, Australia
18:30 AEST		Report	Jansen 2'; 10' (o.g.); Brown 45'; Miller 51'; Hayashi 57'	Stadium: Goodwin Park

== Competitions ==
=== Overall record ===
Competition	First match	Last match	Final position	Record							
Competition	First match	Last match	Final position	Pld	W	D	L	GF	GA	GD	Win %
A-League Women	1 November 2025	4 April 2026	4th	20	9	4	7	37	39	−2	45.00
A-League Women Finals	25 April 2026	10 May 2026	Semi-finals	3	2	0	1	5	3	+2	66.67
Total				23	11	4	8	42	42	+0	47.83

Last updated: 10 May 2026
Source: Competitions

=== A-League Women ===
==== League table ====
Pos	Team	Pld	W	D	L	GF	GA	GD	Pts	Qualification
2	Wellington Phoenix (Note: Wellington Phoenix cannot qualify for the AFC Women's Champions League as they are based in New Zealand, which is part of the Oceania Football Confederation.)	20	10	4	6	38	17	+21	34	Qualification for Finals series
3	Canberra United	20	9	4	7	30	24	+6	31	Qualification for Finals series
4	Brisbane Roar	20	9	4	7	37	39	−2	31	Qualification for Finals series
5	Adelaide United	20	9	3	8	24	26	−2	30	Qualification for Finals series
6	Melbourne Victory	20	8	4	8	27	24	+3	28	Qualification for Finals series

Source: A-Leagues
Rules for classification: 1) points; 2) goal difference; 3) goals scored; 4) wins; 5) head-to-head results; 5a) head-to-head points; 5b) head-to-head goal difference; 6) Fair Play points; 7) away goal difference; 8) away goals per match; 9) home goal difference; 10) home goals per match; 11) toss of a coin in an event of a tie of two clubs.

==== Matches ====
Win Draw Loss

1 November 2025 1	Brisbane Roar	3–2	Melbourne Victory	Brisbane
16:20 AEST	Jansen 22'; Freier 64'; Yallop 86'	Report	Pollicina 34'; White 41'	Stadium: Imperial Corp Stadium; Attendance: 1,245; Referee: Izzy Cooper

7 November 2025 2	Perth Glory	2–3	Brisbane Roar	Perth
16:00 AWST	Badawiya 25'; Lincoln 90+2'	Report	Kuilamu 21'; Jansen 52', 55'	Stadium: HBF Park; Attendance: 1,040; Referee: Bec Mackie

16 November 2025 3	Brisbane Roar	0–1	Western Sydney Wanderers	Brisbane
15:00 AEST		Report	Price 88'	Stadium: Imperial Corp Stadium; Attendance: 1,489; Referee: Mikayla Ryan

7 December 2025 6	Adelaide United	1–3	Brisbane Roar	Adelaide
16:20 ACDT	Healy 51'	Report	Kuilamu 29'; Jansen 49', 67'	Stadium: Coopers Stadium; Attendance: 4,004; Referee: Caitlin Williams

13 December 2025 5	Newcastle Jets	3–0	Brisbane Roar	Newcastle
14:00 AEDT	Ayres 32'; Brown 45+1' (pen.); Breier 71'	Report		Stadium: No.2 Sportsground; Attendance: 1,166; Referee: Sophie Allum
Note: Due to significant player involvement in the international period, the match was postponed by two weeks.

31 December 2025 10	Central Coast Mariners	3–2	Brisbane Roar	Gosford
16:15 AEDT	Coco-Di Sipio 3'; Rasmussen 45+9', 55'	Report	Kuilamu 13'; Freier 18'	Stadium: polytec Stadium; Attendance: 3,298; Referee: Mikayla Ryan

3 January 2026 11	Brisbane Roar	2–2	Wellington Phoenix	Brisbane
15:00 AEST	Miller 17'; Piazza 34'	Report	Elliott 15'; Nunn 90+8'	Stadium: Kayo Stadium; Attendance: 4,494; Referee: Lara Christie Lee

11 January 2026 12	Melbourne Victory	0–1	Brisbane Roar	Melbourne
17:00 AEDT		Report	Brown 56'	Stadium: Home of the Matildas; Attendance: 1,008; Referee: Caitlin Williams

16 January 2026 13	Western Sydney Wanderers	1–1	Brisbane Roar	Sydney
19:00 AEDT	Buchanan 83'	Report	Jansen 90+5'	Stadium: Wanderers Football Park; Attendance: 715; Referee: Lara Christie Lee

20 January 2026 8	Brisbane Roar	1–1	Melbourne City	Brisbane
19:00 AEST	Miller 87'	Report	McNamara 42' (pen.)	Stadium: Imperial Corp Stadium; Attendance: 688; Referee: Izzy Cooper
Note: The match was rescheduled due to Melbourne City's participation in the 2025–26 AFC Women's Champions League.

23 January 2026 14	Brisbane Roar	3–1	Canberra United	Brisbane
18:00 AEST	Brown 45'; Freier 66'; Jansen 89'	Report	Christopherson 13'	Stadium: Imperial Corp Stadium; Attendance: 955; Referee: Rebecca Durcau

30 January 2026 15	Brisbane Roar	2–2	Central Coast Mariners	Brisbane
19:00 AEST	Miller 9'; Brown 74'	Report	Rasmussen 14' (pen.), 77'	Stadium: Imperial Corp Stadium; Attendance: 1,899; Referee: Sophie Allum

4 February 2026 9	Sydney FC	1–3	Brisbane Roar	Sydney
19:30 AEDT	Lowry 37'	Report	Brown 9'; Hayashi 48', 74'	Stadium: Leichhardt Oval; Attendance: 879; Referee: Molly Godsell
Note: The game was postponed from 28 December 2025, due to the Leichhardt Oval pitch not being ready to accommodate games.

8 February 2026 16	Melbourne City	5–2	Brisbane Roar	Melbourne
17:00 AEDT	Stott 36'; McNamara 41'; Henry 48'; Jackson 69'; Keane 82'	Report	Stephenson 8', 13'	Stadium: ctrl:cyber Pitch; Attendance: 547; Referee: Isabella Mossin

13 February 2026 17	Brisbane Roar	0–4	Sydney FC	Brisbane
18:00 AEST		Report	Hawkesby 47'; Pearson 59'; Tanner 68'; Halmarick 90+3'	Stadium: Imperial Corp Stadium; Attendance: 520; Referee: Izzy Cooper

22 February 2026 18	Brisbane Roar	0–2	Adelaide United	Brisbane
17:00 AEST		Report	E. Hodgson 11'; Tonkin 78'	Stadium: Imperial Corp Stadium; Attendance: 668; Referee: Sophie Allum

14 March 2026 19	Wellington Phoenix	3–0	Brisbane Roar	Wellington
18:00 NZDT	Elliott 10'; Pijnenburg 16'; Woods 72'	Report		Stadium: Sky Stadium; Attendance: 4,169; Referee: Sarah Jones

20 March 2026 20	Brisbane Roar	4–2	Newcastle Jets	Brisbane
17:00 AEST	Brown 47', 52', 62'; Jansen 69'	Report	Prior 73'; Hoban 90'	Stadium: Imperial Corp Stadium; Attendance: 1,363; Referee: Rebecca Durcau

27 March 2026 21	Brisbane Roar	5–2	Perth Glory	Brisbane
18:00 AEST	Medwin 20'; Hayashi 32', 65'; Stephenson 57'; Yallop 90+7'	Report	Sardo 45+2'; Badawiya 49'	Stadium: Imperial Corp Stadium; Attendance: 2,044; Referee: Rachael Mitchenson

4 April 2026 22	Canberra United	1–2	Brisbane Roar	Canberra
15:00 AEDT	Heyman 62'	Report	Medwin 21'; Woods 68'	Stadium: McKellar Park; Attendance: 1,934; Referee: Isabella Mossin

==== Finals series ====
25 April 2026 Elimination-final	Brisbane Roar	3–0	Adelaide United	Brisbane
17:00 AEST	Stephenson 51', 57'; Medwin 83'	Report		Stadium: Imperial Corp Stadium; Attendance: 3,500; Referee: Lara Lee

3 May 2026 Semi-final 1st leg	Brisbane Roar	2–1	Wellington Phoenix	Brisbane
17:00 AEST	Hayashi 14'; Brown 72'	Report	Jale 2'	Stadium: Imperial Corp Stadium; Attendance: 3,849; Referee: Isabella Mossin

10 May 2026 Semi-final 2nd leg	Wellington Phoenix	2–0 (a.e.t.) (3–2 agg.)	Brisbane Roar	Porirua
14:30 NZST	Woods 42', 102'	Report		Stadium: Jerry Collins Stadium; Attendance: 5,923; Referee: Caitlin Williams

== Statistics ==
=== Appearances and goals ===
Includes all competitions. Players with no appearances not included in the list.

As of match played 10 May 2026

No.	Pos	Nat	Player	Total		A-League Women		A-League Women Finals	
No.	Pos	Nat	Player	Apps	Goals	Apps	Goals	Apps	Goals
1	GK	(Australia) AUS	Chloe Lincoln	21	0	18	0	3	0
2	DF	(Philippines) PHI	Angela Beard	7	0	3+1	0	3	0
3	FW	(Australia) AUS	Daisy Brown	17	8	12+2	7	3	1
4	FW	(Australia) AUS	Kijah Stephenson	23	5	9+11	3	3	2
5	DF	(Australia) AUS	Aimee Medwin	22	3	19	2	3	1
6	DF	(Australia) AUS	Ruby Cuthbert	7	0	4+1	0	2	0
7	MF	(Japan) JPN	Momo Hayashi	20	5	17	4	3	1
8	MF	(United States) USA	Josie Studer	23	0	13+7	0	3	0
10	FW	(Australia) AUS	Grace Kuilamu	6	3	6	3	0	0
11	DF	(United States) USA	Marianna Seidl	20	0	16+1	0	3	0
12	GK	(Australia) AUS	Tahlia Franco	2	0	2	0	0	0
13	MF	(Australia) AUS	Tameka Yallop	11	2	2+6	2	0+3	0
14	MF	(Australia) AUS	Zara Kruger	9	0	3+5	0	0+1	0
15	MF	(Australia) AUS	Kiera Meyers	21	0	8+10	0	0+3	0
17	FW	(Netherlands) NED	Bente Jansen	22	8	18+1	8	1+2	0
18	DF	(Australia) AUS	Amali Kinsella	9	0	0+9	0	0	0
22	DF	(Australia) AUS	Ava Piazza	13	1	7+6	1	0	0
24	MF	(Australia) AUS	Sharn Freier	12	3	11+1	3	0	0
27	FW	(United States) USA	Ashlyn Miller	23	3	18+2	3	3	0
32	MF	(Australia) AUS	Alicia Woods	23	1	20	1	3	0
47	FW	(Australia) AUS	Kyla Hanson	2	0	0+1	0	0+1	0
Player(s) transferred out but featured this season
2	DF	(Australia) AUS	Leia Varley	12	0	12	0	0	0

=== Disciplinary record ===
Includes all competitions. The list is sorted by squad number when total cards are equal. Players with no cards not included in the list.

As of match played 10 May 2026

Rank	No.	Pos.	Nat.	Name	A-League Women			A-League Women Finals			Total							
Rank	No.	Pos.	Nat.	Name	Yellow card	(yellow card) (yellow-red card)	Red card	Yellow card	(yellow card) (yellow-red card)	Red card	Yellow card	(yellow card) (yellow-red card)	Red card					
Rank	No.	Pos.	Nat.	Name	1	8	DF	(United States)	Josie Studer	3	0	0	1	0	0	4	0	0
32	MF	(Australia)	Alicia Woods	4	1	0	0	0	0	0	4	0	0					
3	11	DF	(United States)	Marianna Seidl	3	0	0	0	0	0	3	0	0					
4	1	GK	(Australia)	Chloe Lincoln	2	0	0	0	0	0	2	0	0					
4	27	FW	(United States)	Ashlynn Miller	1	0	0	1	0	0	2	0	0					
6	2	DF	(Philippines)	Angela Beard	1	0	0	0	0	0	1	0	0					
6	3	FW	(Australia)	Daisy Brown	1	0	0	0	0	0	1	0	0					
6	5	DF	(Australia)	Aimee Medwin	1	0	0	0	0	0	1	0	0					
6	12	GK	(Australia)	Tahlia Franco	1	0	0	0	0	0	1	0	0					
6	14	MF	(Australia)	Zara Kruger	0	0	0	1	0	0	1	0	0					
6	22	DF	(Australia)	Ava Piazza	1	0	0	0	0	0	1	0	0					
Player(s) transferred out but featured this season
3	2	DF	(Australia)	Leia Varley	3	0	0	0	0	0	3	0	0					
Total					21	0	0	3	0	0	24	0	0					

=== Clean sheets ===
Includes all competitions. The list is sorted by squad number when total clean sheets are equal. Numbers in parentheses represent games where both goalkeepers participated and both kept a clean sheet; the number in parentheses is awarded to the goalkeeper who was substituted on, whilst a full clean sheet is awarded to the goalkeeper who was on the field at the start of play. Goalkeepers with no clean sheets not included in the list.

As of match played 10 May 2026

Rank	No.	Nat.	Goalkeeper	A-League Women	A-League Women Finals	Total
1	1	(Australia)	Chloe Lincoln	1	1	2

== See also ==
- 2025–26 Brisbane Roar FC season
- Defection of Iran women's national football team
