= 2023–24 Brisbane Roar FC (women) season =

Brisbane Roar (A-League Women)
2023–24 season
- Chairman: Kaz Patafta
- Manager: Garrath McPherson (until 13 November 2023); Alex Smith (from 14 November 2023)
- Stadium: Ballymore Stadium; Perry Park
- A-League Women: 9th
- A-League Women Finals: DNQ
- Top goalscorer: Mia Corbin (8)
- Highest home attendance: 3,679 vs. Sydney FC (21 October 2023); A-League Women
- Lowest home attendance: 1,100 vs. Central Coast Mariners (9 March 2024); A-League Women
- Average home league attendance: 2,310
- Biggest win: 3–1 vs. Western Sydney Wanderers (A) (27 January 2024); A-League Women; 2–0 vs. Melbourne City (H) (2 March 2024); A-League Women; 2–0 vs. Perth Glory (H) (24 March 2024); A-League Women
- Biggest defeat: 1–5 vs. Canberra United (A) (10 December 2023); A-League Women
Home colours	Away colours	Third colours
- All statistics correct as of 30 March 2024.

The 2023–24 season was the 16th in the history of Brisbane Roar Football Club (A-League Women).

== Players ==
=== First-team squad ===
As of 8 March 2024

Note: Flags indicate national team as defined under FIFA eligibility rules; some limited exceptions apply. Players may hold more than one non-FIFA nationality.

No.	Pos.	Nation	Player
1	GK	AUS	Keeley Richards
2	MF	AUS	Bec Kirkup
3	DF	IRL	Deborah-Anne De la Harpe
4	MF	AUS	Kijah Stephenson
5	DF	AUS	Jenna McCormick
6	DF	AUS	Holly McQueen
7	MF	AUS	Ayesha Norrie (captain)
8	FW	BRA	Mariel Hecher (vice-captain)
9	FW	USA	Mia Corbin
10	FW	AUS	Grace Kuilamu (scholarship)
11	FW	AUS	Sharn Freier
12	FW	AUS	Tamar Levin
13	MF	AUS	Tameka Yallop

No.	Pos.	Nation	Player
14	MF	AUS	Sarah O'Donoghue
15	FW	DEN	Hannah Holgersen
16	DF	AUS	Chelsea Blissett
17	DF	USA	Leah Scarpelli
18	DF	AUS	Teagan Thompson
19	DF	AUS	Hollie Palmer
20	FW	AUS	Bonnie Davies
21	GK	AUS	Isabella Shuttleworth (scholarship)
22	DF	AUS	Ruby Cuthbert
23	FW	AUS	Ashlee Brodigan
32	MF	AUS	Alicia Woods (scholarship)
99	GK	AUS	Emma Gibbon

== Transfers ==
=== Transfers in ===
No.	Position	Player	Transferred from	Type/fee	Contract length	Date	Ref
1	GK	Keeley Richards	Canberra United	Free transfer	1 year	16 August 2023	
22	DF	Ruby Cuthbert	(Australia) Football West NTC	Free transfer	3 years	17 August 2023	
5	DF	Jenna McCormick	Adelaide United	Free transfer	1 year	22 August 2023	
15	FW	(Denmark) Hannah Holgersen	Adelaide United	Free transfer	1 year	23 August 2023	
13	MF	Tameka Yallop	(Norway) Brann	Free transfer	2 years	24 August 2023	
16	DF	Chelsea Blissett	Melbourne City	Free transfer	1 year	25 August 2023	
23	FW	Ashlee Brodigan	Newcastle Jets	Free transfer	1 year	25 August 2023	
17	DF	(United States) Leah Scarpelli	(Portugal) Sporting CP	Free transfer	1 year	28 August 2023	
9	FW	(United States) Mia Corbin	(Italy) Parma	Free transfer	1 year	30 August 2023	
10	FW	Grace Kuilamu	(Australia) QAS	Scholarship	2 years	6 September 2023	
29	GK	(United States) Jordan Silkowitz	(United States) Kansas City Current	Loan	7 months	13 September 2023	
18	DF	Teagan Thompson	(Australia) Lions FC	Free transfer	1 year	21 September 2023	
2	MF	Bec Kirkup	(Australia) Lions FC	Free transfer	1 year	13 October 2023	
14	MF	Sarah O'Donoghue	(Australia) Souths United	Free transfer	1 year	13 October 2023	
99	GK	Emma Gibbon	(Australia) Eastern Suburbs	Free transfer	1 year	13 October 2023	
20	FW	Bonnie Davies	Newcastle Jets	Free transfer	6 months	16 December 2023	
3	DF	(Republic of Ireland) Deborah-Anne De la Harpe	Unattached	Free transfer	6 months	22 December 2023	
32	MF	Alicia Woods	(Australia) Peninsula Power	Scholarship	6 months	4 January 2024	

=== Transfers out ===
No.	Position	Player	Transferred to	Type/fee	Date	Ref.
3	DF	Jessie Rasschaert	Retired		5 April 2023	
31	FW	Aleeah Davern	(Australia) Souths United	End of contract	21 April 2023	
51	GK	(United States) Hensley Hancuff	(United States) Gotham FC	End of loan	26 April 2023	
16	MF	Zara Kruger	(Australia) Lions FC	End of loan	1 May 2023	
17	DF	Talitha Kramer	(Australia) Brisbane City	End of contract	23 May 2023	
21	GK	Mia Bailey	(Australia) Gold Coast United	End of contract	1 June 2023	
12	FW	(United States) Shea Connors	(United States) San Diego Wave	End of contract	27 June 2023	
5	DF	Jamilla Rankin	Melbourne Victory	Free transfer	23 August 2023	
27	FW	(New Zealand) Indiah-Paige Riley	(Netherlands) PSV	End of contract	24 August 2023	
2	DF	Annabel Haffenden	Unattached	End of contract	15 September 2023	
20	FW	Georgia Beaumont	Unattached	End of contract	15 September 2023	
78	MF	(France) Margot Robinne	Unattached	End of contract	15 September 2023	
29	GK	(United States) Jordan Silkowitz	(United States) Kansas City Current	End of loan	8 March 2024	

=== Contract extensions ===
No.	Name	Position	Duration	Date	Notes
7	Ayesha Norrie	Midfielder	1 year	11 August 2023	
8	(Brazil) Mariel Hecher	Forward	1 year	16 August 2023	
19	Hollie Palmer	Midfielder	1 year	17 August 2023	
4	Kijah Stephenson	Midfielder	2 years	31 August 2023	
6	Holly McQueen	Defender	1 year	31 August 2023	
11	Sharn Freier	Forward	Multi-year	1 September 2023	
12	Tamar Levin	Forward	Multi-year	4 September 2023	
21	Isabella Shuttleworth	Goalkeeper	1 year	5 September 2023	scholarship

== Pre-season and friendlies ==
23 September 2023	Football Queensland Select (Australia)	0–1	(Australia) Brisbane Roar	Brisbane
12:00 ACST		Report	Brodigan 74'	Stadium: Underwood Park

== Competitions ==
=== Overall record ===
Competition	First match	Last match	Starting round	Final position	Record							
Competition	First match	Last match	Starting round	Final position	Pld	W	D	L	GF	GA	GD	Win %
A-League Women	15 October 2023	30 March 2024	Matchday 1	9th	22	7	5	10	28	35	−7	31.82
Total					22	7	5	10	28	35	−7	31.82

Source: Soccerway

=== A-League Women ===
==== League table ====
Pos	Team	Pld	W	D	L	GF	GA	GD	Pts
7	Western Sydney Wanderers	22	10	3	9	30	30	0	33
8	Wellington Phoenix (Note: Wellington Phoenix cannot qualify for Asian Football Confederation competitions as they are based in New Zealand, which is under the Oceania Football Confederation.)	22	9	1	12	36	33	+3	28
9	Brisbane Roar	22	7	5	10	28	35	−7	26
10	Perth Glory	22	6	6	10	25	32	−7	24
11	Canberra United	22	6	6	10	39	47	−8	24

Source: A-Leagues
Rules for classification: 1) points; 2) wins; 3) goal difference; 4) goals scored; 5) head-to-head results; 6) Fair Play points; 7) away head-to-head results; 8) home head-to-head results; 9) toss of a coin

==== Results summary ====
Overall								Home						Away					
Pld	W	D	L	GF	GA	GD	Pts	W	D	L	GF	GA	GD	W	D	L	GF	GA	GD
21	7	5	9	27	33	−6	26	4	2	3	10	8	+2	3	3	6	17	25	−8

Last updated: 30 March 2024.
Source: KEEPUP

==== Results by round ====
Round	1	2	3	4	5	6	7	8	9	10	11	12	13	14	15	16	17	18	19	20	21	22
Ground	A	H	A	A	H	H	A	H	A	A	H	N	A	A	H	A	A	H	H	A	H	H
Result	W	W	L	D	L	D	L	D	D	L	W	L	D	W	L	L	L	W	L	W	W	L
Position	3	3	4	4	6	5	7	8	9	10	9	10	10	10	10	10	10	9	10	9	8	9
Points	3	6	6	7	7	8	8	9	10	10	13	13	14	17	17	17	17	20	20	23	26	26

Updated to match(es) played on 30 March 2024. Source: KEEPUP
A = Away; H = Home; N = Neutral; W = Win; D = Draw; L = Loss

==== Matches ====
Win Draw Loss

15 October 2023 1	Melbourne Victory	1–2	Brisbane Roar	Melbourne
16:00 AEDT	O'Grady 90+4'	Report	Kuilamu 49'; McCormick 70'	Stadium: The Home of the Matildas; Attendance: 2,588; Referee: Anna-Marie Keighley

21 October 2023 2	Brisbane Roar	1–0	Sydney FC	Brisbane
15:00 AEST	Blissett 21'	Report		Stadium: Ballymore Stadium; Attendance: 3,679; Referee: Isabella Blaess

4 November 2023 3	Wellington Phoenix	2–1	Brisbane Roar	Wellington
14:45 NZDT	Speckmaier 6'; Longo 86'	Report	Corbin 90+4'	Stadium: Sky Stadium; Attendance: 1,788; Referee: Georgia Ghirardello

12 November 2023 4	Central Coast Mariners	1–1	Brisbane Roar	Gosford
14:15 AEDT	Badawiya 26'	Report	Norrie 27'	Stadium: Industree Group Stadium; Attendance: 3,281; Referee: Bec Mackie

19 November 2023 5	Brisbane Roar	0–1	Western United	Brisbane
15:00 AEST		Report	Johnson 12'	Stadium: Ballymore Stadium; Attendance: 2,486; Referee: Rebecca Durcau

25 November 2023 6	Brisbane Roar	1–1	Adelaide United	Brisbane
15:00 AEST	Corbin 38'	Report	Lee 13'	Stadium: Suncorp Stadium; Attendance: 3,278; Referee: Isabella Libri
Note: The match was originally scheduled for 25 November 2023 at 15:00 AEST, but was moved back a day, and relocated from Ballymore Stadium to Suncorp Stadium.

10 December 2023 7	Canberra United	5–1	Brisbane Roar	Canberra
16:00 AEDT	Milivojević 6', 17', 73'; Christopherson 37'; Stanic-Floody 73'	Report	Freier 49'	Stadium: McKellar Park; Attendance: 1,236; Referee: Rebecca Durcau

17 December 2023 8	Brisbane Roar	1–1	Western Sydney Wanderers	Brisbane
17:00 AEST	Corbin 26'	Report	Harding 50'	Stadium: Perry Park; Attendance: 1,575; Referee: Kate Jacewicz

22 December 2023 9	Sydney FC	1–1	Brisbane Roar	Sydney
19:00 AEDT	Vine 42'	Report	Brodigan 12'	Stadium: Leichhardt Oval; Attendance: 3,241; Referee: Isabella Mossin

28 December 2023 10	Melbourne City	5–3	Brisbane Roar	Melbourne
17:00 AEDT	Ekic 20', 22', 52'; Wilkinson 35'; Pollicina 75' (pen.)	Report	Corbin 4', 72'; McCormick 47'	Stadium: AAMI Park; Attendance: 2,314; Referee: Rebecca Durcau

7 January 2024 11	Brisbane Roar	2–1	Wellington Phoenix	Brisbane
17:00 AEST	Yallop 34'; Stephenson 46'	Report	Cox 20'	Stadium: Perry Park; Attendance: 1,955; Referee: Caitlin Williams

13 January 2024 12	Brisbane Roar	1–2	Newcastle Jets	Sydney
19:45 AEDT	Corbin 65'	Report	Bolden 63'; Yallop 77' (o.g.)	Stadium: Leichhardt Oval; Attendance: 1,417; Referee: Isabella Libri
Note: Originally scheduled for 14 January 2024, was moved due to Unite Round.

20 January 2024 13	Perth Glory	0–0	Brisbane Roar	Perth
19:00 AWST		Report		Stadium: Macedonia Park; Attendance: 1,205; Referee: Mikayla Ryan

27 January 2024 14	Western Sydney Wanderers	1–3	Brisbane Roar	Sydney
17:00 AEDT	Caspers 39'	Report	Stephenson 11'; Yallop 48'; Corbin 52'	Stadium: Marconi Stadium; Attendance: 852; Referee: Caitlin Williams

3 February 2024 15	Brisbane Roar	1–2	Melbourne Victory	Brisbane
17:00 AEST	Yallop 36'	Report	Checker 4'; Lowe 77' (pen.)	Stadium: Perry Park; Attendance: 2,175; Referee: Rebecca Durcau

11 February 2024 16	Western United	3–2	Brisbane Roar	Melbourne
17:00 AEDT	Logarzo 8', 90+2' (pen.); Taranto 79'	Report	Stephenson 29'; Corbin 31'	Stadium: City Vista Recreation Reserve; Attendance: 607; Referee: Bec Mackie

17 February 2024 17	Newcastle Jets	3–0	Brisbane Roar	Maitland
17:00 AEDT	Bolden 39', 77', 78'	Report		Stadium: Maitland Sportsground; Attendance: 1,938; Referee: Beth Rattray

2 March 2024 18	Brisbane Roar	2–0	Melbourne City	Brisbane
17:00 AEST	Yallop 59'; Freier 61'	Report		Stadium: Perry Park; Attendance: 2,158; Referee: Bec Mackie

9 March 2024 19	Brisbane Roar	0–2	Central Coast Mariners	Brisbane
15:00 AEST		Report	Wurigumula 45'; Simon 46'	Stadium: Ballymore Stadium; Attendance: 1,100; Referee: Casey Reibelt

16 March 2024 20	Adelaide United	1–2	Brisbane Roar	Adelaide
14:30 ACDT	Dawber 26'	Report	De la Harpe 9'; Yallop 74'	Stadium: Marden Sports Complex; Attendance: 742; Referee: Rebecca Durcau

24 March 2024 21	Brisbane Roar	2–0	Perth Glory	Brisbane
15:00 AEST	Stephenson 33'; Freier 43'	Report		Stadium: Perry Park; Attendance: 1,848; Referee: Caitlin Williams

30 March 2024 22	Brisbane Roar	1–2	Canberra United	Brisbane
15:00 AEST	McCormick 43'	Report	Heyman 84'; Milivojević 86'	Stadium: Perry Park; Attendance: 2,842; Referee: Kate Jacewicz

== Statistics ==
=== Appearances and goals ===
Includes all competitions. Players with no appearances not included in the list.

As of 30 March 2024

No.	Pos.	Nat.	Name	A-League Women		Total	
No.	Pos.	Nat.	Name	Apps	Goals	Apps	Goals
1	GK	(Australia)	Keeley Richards	3	0	3	0
2	FW	(Australia)	Rebecca Kirkup	4+10	0	14	0
3	DF	(Republic of Ireland)	Deborah-Anne De la Harpe	12	1	12	1
4	FW	(Australia)	Kijah Stephenson	16+5	4	21	4
5	DF	(Australia)	Jenna McCormick	22	3	22	3
6	DF	(Australia)	Holly McQueen	19	0	19	0
7	MF	(Australia)	Ayesha Norrie	18+1	1	19	1
8	FW	(Brazil)	Mariel Hecher	1+9	0	10	0
9	FW	(United States)	Mia Corbin	21	8	21	8
10	FW	(Australia)	Grace Kuilamu	2	1	2	1
11	FW	(Australia)	Sharn Freier	22	3	22	3
12	DF	(Australia)	Tamar Levin	0+12	0	12	0
13	MF	(Australia)	Tameka Yallop	19+1	5	20	5
14	MF	(Australia)	Sarah O'Donoghue	0+3	0	3	0
15	FW	(Denmark)	Hannah Holgersen	2+5	0	7	0
16	DF	(Australia)	Chelsea Blissett	5	1	5	1
17	MF	(United States)	Leah Scarpelli	17	0	17	0
18	DF	(Australia)	Tegan Thompson	8+3	0	11	0
19	MF	(Australia)	Hollie Palmer	15+5	0	20	0
20	FW	(Australia)	Bonnie Davies	0+10	0	10	0
22	DF	(Australia)	Ruby Cuthbert	4+1	0	5	0
23	FW	(Australia)	Ashlee Brodigan	5+6	1	11	1
29	GK	(United States)	Jordan Silkowitz	19	0	19	0
32	MF	(Australia)	Alicia Woods	7	0	7	0

=== Disciplinary record ===
Includes all competitions. The list is sorted by squad number when total cards are equal. Players with no cards not included in the list.

As of 30 March 2024

Rank	No.	Pos.	Nat.	Name	A-League Women			Total		
Rank	No.	Pos.	Nat.	Name	Yellow card	(yellow card) (yellow-red card)	Red card	Yellow card	(yellow card) (yellow-red card)	Red card
1	6	DF	(Australia)	Holly McQueen	0	0	1	0	0	1
2	19	MF	(Australia)	Hollie Palmer	7	0	0	7	0	0
3	7	MF	(Australia)	Ayesha Norrie	6	0	0	6	0	0
4	11	FW	(Australia)	Sharn Freier	3	0	0	3	0	0
5	3	DF	(Republic of Ireland)	Deborah-Anne De la Harpe	2	0	0	2	0	0
5	5	DF	(Australia)	Jenna McCormick	2	0	0	2	0	0
5	17	MF	(United States)	Leah Scarpelli	2	0	0	2	0	0
8	9	FW	(United States)	Mia Corbin	1	0	0	1	0	0
8	12	DF	(Australia)	Tamar Levin	1	0	0	1	0	0
8	13	MF	(Australia)	Tameka Yallop	1	0	0	1	0	0
8	18	DF	(Australia)	Tegan Thompson	1	0	0	1	0	0
8	22	DF	(Australia)	Ruby Cuthbert	1	0	0	1	0	0
8	29	GK	(United States)	Jordan Silkowitz	1	0	0	1	0	0
Total					28	0	1	28	0	1

=== Clean sheets ===
Includes all competitions. The list is sorted by squad number when total clean sheets are equal. Numbers in parentheses represent games where both goalkeepers participated and both kept a clean sheet; the number in parentheses is awarded to the goalkeeper who was substituted on, whilst a full clean sheet is awarded to the goalkeeper who was on the field at the start of play. Goalkeepers with no clean sheets not included in the list.

As of 30 March 2024

Rank	No.	Nat.	Goalkeeper	A-League Women	Total
1	29	(United States)	Jordan Silkowitz	3	3
2	1	(Australia)	Keeley Richards	1	1
Total				4	4

== See also ==
- 2023–24 Brisbane Roar FC season
