= 2024–25 A-League Women =

Seventeenth edition of the top Australian women's football (soccer) league

A-League Women
- Season: 2024–25
- Dates: 1 November 2024 – 18 May 2025
- Champions: Central Coast Mariners (1st title)
- Premiers: Melbourne City (4th title)
- AFC Champions League: Melbourne City
- Matches: 138
- Goals: 418 (3.03 per match)
- Top goalscorer: Holly McNamara (15)
- Biggest home win: Western Sydney Wanderers 5–1 Western United (14 December 2024); Central Coast Mariners 5–1 Newcastle Jets (1 February 2025); Melbourne City 5–1 Western United (5 February 2025)
- Biggest away win: Western United 2–8 Brisbane Roar (29 December 2024)
- Highest scoring: Western United 2–8 Brisbane Roar (29 December 2024)
- Longest winning run: 7 matches Melbourne Victory
- Longest unbeaten run: 23 matches Melbourne City
- Longest winless run: 10 matches Newcastle Jets
- Longest losing run: 5 matches Brisbane Roar; Western Sydney Wanderers
- Highest attendance: 8,582; Adelaide United 1–0 Central Coast Mariners (8 March 2025)
- Lowest attendance: 326; Melbourne City 4–3 Adelaide United (16 March 2025)
- Total attendance: 216,884
- Average attendance: 1,583
- All statistics correct as of 20 April 2025. (Note: Longest runs only include regular season results)

The 2024–25 A-League Women, known as the Ninja A-League for sponsorship reasons, was the seventeenth season of A-League Women, the Australian national women's soccer competition.

Melbourne City were the defending premiers and Sydney FC were the defending champions.

Central Coast Mariners won their first ever A-League Women title, defeating Melbourne Victory 5–4 on penalties after a 1–1 draw after extra time in the Grand Final. Melbourne City retained their status as premiers but did not play in the Grand Final, having been defeated by Central Coast Mariners in the semi-finals.

== Clubs ==

=== Stadiums and locations ===
Team	Location	Stadium	Capacity
Adelaide United	Adelaide	Coopers Stadium	16,500
Adelaide United	Adelaide	Marden Sports Complex	6,000
Adelaide United	Adelaide	ServiceFM Stadium	7,000
Brisbane Roar	Brisbane	Perry Park	5,000
Canberra United	Canberra	McKellar Park	3,500
Central Coast Mariners	Gosford	Industree Group Stadium	20,059
Central Coast Mariners	Woy Woy	Woy Woy Oval	1,500
Melbourne City	Melbourne	AAMI Park	30,050
Melbourne City	Melbourne	City Football Academy	9,000
Melbourne Victory	Melbourne	AAMI Park	30,050
Melbourne Victory	Melbourne	The Home of the Matildas	3,000
Newcastle Jets	Newcastle	Newcastle Number 2 Sports Ground	5,000
Newcastle Jets	Newcastle	McDonald Jones Stadium	33,000
Newcastle Jets	Maitland	Maitland Regional Sportsground	8,000
Perth Glory	Perth	Sam Kerr Football Centre	2,500
Perth Glory	Perth	HBF Park	20,500
Sydney FC	Sydney	Leichhardt Oval	20,000
Sydney FC	Sydney	Allianz Stadium	42,500
Wellington Phoenix	Porirua	Jerry Collins Stadium	1,900
Western Sydney Wanderers	Sydney	CommBank Stadium	30,000
Western Sydney Wanderers	Sydney	Wanderers Football Park	1,000
Western United	Tarneit	Ironbark Fields	5,000

=== Personnel and kits ===
Team	Manager	Captain	Kit manufacturers	Kit sponsors
Adelaide United	(Australia) Adrian Stenta	(Australia) Isabel Hodgson	UCAN	Kite
Brisbane Roar	(United States) Alex Smith	(Australia) Tameka Yallop	Cikers	Ausenco
Canberra United	(Australia) Antoni Jagarinec	(Australia) Michelle Heyman	Cikers	University of Canberra
Central Coast Mariners	(England) Emily Husband	(Australia) Taren King	Cikers	Budget
Melbourne City	(Australia) Michael Matricciani	(New Zealand) Rebekah Stott	Puma	Etihad Airways
Melbourne Victory	(Wales) Jeff Hopkins	(United States) Kayla Morrison	Macron	Turkish Airlines
Newcastle Jets	(Australia) Ryan Campbell	(Australia) Cassidy Davis	Legend Sportswear	Port of Newcastle
Perth Glory	(Australia) Stephen Peters	(Australia) Isobel Dalton (Nigeria) Onyinyechi Zogg	Macron	Boom Logistics
Sydney FC	(Australia) Ante Juric	(Australia) Natalie Tobin	Under Armour	Macquarie University
Wellington Phoenix	(England) Paul Temple	(New Zealand) Annalie Longo	Paladin Sports	Entelar Group; Oppo (Note: Away kit)
Western Sydney Wanderers	(Australia) Geoff Abrahams	(Australia) Amy Harrison	Adidas	Herbalife
Western United	(Australia) Kat Smith	(Australia) Chloe Logarzo	Kappa	Sharp

=== Managerial changes ===
Team	Outgoing manager	Manner of departure	Date of vacancy	Position on table	Incoming manager	Date of appointment
Canberra United	(Australia) Njegosh Popovich	End of contract	17 May 2024	Pre-season	(Australia) Antoni Jagarinec	24 June 2024
Newcastle Jets	(Australia) Ryan Campbell (caretaker)	Promoted to full-time	—N/a	Pre-season	(Australia) Ryan Campbell	12 June 2024
Perth Glory	(Australia) Alex Epakis	Mutual contract termination	24 June 2024	Pre-season	(Australia) Stephen Peters	26 July 2024
Melbourne City	(Australia) Dario Vidošić	Signed by Brighton & Hove Albion	10 July 2024	Pre-season	(Australia) Michael Matricciani	21 August 2024
Western Sydney Wanderers	(Australia) Robbie Hooker	Mutual contract termination	7 January 2025	11th	(Australia) Geoff Abrahams (caretaker)	7 January 2025
Western Sydney Wanderers	(Australia) Geoff Abrahams (caretaker)	Promoted to full-time	—N/a	12th	(Australia) Geoff Abrahams	21 March 2025

=== Foreign players ===
Club	Visa 1	Visa 2	Visa 3	Visa 4	Visa 5	Non-Visa foreigner(s)	Former player(s)
Adelaide United	(Dominican Republic) Lucía León	(England) Abby Clarke	(England) Fiona Worts	(Republic of Ireland) Erin Healy	(Japan) Nanako Sasaki	(New Zealand) Claudia Jenkins^{A}	
Brisbane Roar	(Bulgaria) Evdokiya Popadinova	(Japan) Momo Hayashi	(Singapore) Danelle Tan	(United States) Anneka Lewerenz	(United States) Emily Pringle	(Republic of Ireland) Deborah-Anne De la Harpe^{A}	(United States) Olivia Sekany
Canberra United	(New Zealand) Ruby Nathan	(Philippines) Madison Ayson					(New Zealand) Elizabeth Anton
Central Coast Mariners	(England) Brooke Nunn	(England) Jade Pennock	(Republic of Ireland) Sarah Rowe			(Croatia) Bianca Galic^{A} (United States) Blake Hughes^{B}	(United States) Brianne Riley
Melbourne City	(Canada) Kathryn Harvey	(Mexico) Lourdes Bosch	(Spain) Malena Mieres	(United States) Taylor Otto	(Venezuela) Mariana Speckmaier	(New Zealand) Rebekah Stott^{A} (Serbia) Tyla-Jay Vlajnic^{A}	
Melbourne Victory	(England) Ellie Wilson	(New Zealand) Claudia Bunge	(United States) Sara D'Appolonia			(United States) Kayla Morrison^{B}	
Newcastle Jets	(Canada) Danielle Krzyzaniak	(New Zealand) Deven Jackson	(Switzerland) Lorena Baumann	(United States) Gia Vicari			
Perth Glory	(Japan) Miku Sunaga	(New Zealand) Kelli Brown	(Nigeria) Onyinyechi Zogg	(United States) Gabby Hollar	(Wales) Megan Wynne		
Sydney FC	(England) Faye Bryson	(England) Millie Farrow	(United States) Shea Connors	(United States) Jordan Thompson		(New Zealand) Brianna Edwards^{A}	
Wellington Phoenix	(England) Olivia Fergusson	(Japan) Mebae Tanaka	(Portugal) Carolina Vilão	(United States) Alivia Kelly	(United States) Maya McCutcheon	(Lebanon) Tiana Jaber^{A}	(Algeria) Imane Chebel
Western Sydney Wanderers	(Japan) Ena Harada	(Japan) Aya Seino				(Portugal) Siena Arrarte^{A}	
Western United	(Colombia) Isabel Dehakiz	(Colombia) Sandra Ibarguen	(Japan) Keiwa Hieda	(Philippines) Sara Eggesvik	(United States) Catherine Zimmerman		

The following do not fill a Visa position:
- ^{A} Australian citizens who have last represented other countries at international level
- ^{B} Those players who were born and started their professional career abroad but have since gained Australian citizenship

== Regular season ==
The regular season is made up of a full home-and-away 22-round schedule for each club, with an extra round called Unite Round, for a total of 23 matches.

=== League table ===
Pos	Team	Pld	W	D	L	GF	GA	GD	Pts	Qualification
1	Melbourne City	23	16	7	0	56	22	+34	55	Qualification for AFC Women's Champions League and Finals series
2	Melbourne Victory	23	16	5	2	42	21	+21	53	Qualification for Finals series
3	Adelaide United	23	14	3	6	44	30	+14	45	Qualification for Finals series
4	Central Coast Mariners (C)	23	9	7	7	31	25	+6	34	Qualification for Finals series
5	Canberra United	23	9	6	8	28	31	−3	33	Qualification for Finals series
6	Western United	23	9	6	8	39	46	−7	33	Qualification for Finals series
7	Brisbane Roar	23	8	2	13	46	42	+4	26	
8	Sydney FC	23	7	4	12	23	29	−6	25	
9	Wellington Phoenix (Note: Wellington Phoenix cannot qualify for the AFC Women's Champions League as they are based in New Zealand, which is part of the Oceania Football Confederation.)	23	7	3	13	25	30	−5	24	
10	Perth Glory	23	6	4	13	27	43	−16	22	
11	Newcastle Jets	23	5	5	13	29	53	−24	20	
12	Western Sydney Wanderers	23	4	4	15	28	46	−18	16	

Source: A-Leagues
Rules for classification: 1) points; 2) goal difference; 3) goals scored; 4) wins; 5) head-to-head results; 5a) head-to-head points; 5b) head-to-head goal difference; 6) Fair Play points; 7) away goal difference; 8) away goals per match; 9) home goal difference; 10) home goals per match; 11) toss of a coin in an event of a tie of two clubs.
(C) Champions

=== Results ===
Individual matches are collated at each club's season article.

Home-and-away

Home \ Away	ADL	BRI	CAN	CCM	MCY	MVC	NEW	PER	SYD	WEL	WSW	WUN
Adelaide United		3–1	1–1	1–0	1–3	2–3	2–0	3–0	2–1	2–1	1–0	1–1
Brisbane Roar	2–3		1–2	2–1	0–4	2–0	2–3	3–0	1–0	1–0	4–4	0–0
Canberra United	0–2	3–2		1–1	1–1	0–2	0–0	1–0	0–1	1–0	1–0	2–1
Central Coast Mariners	0–1	2–1	2–1		0–0	0–1	5–1	3–3	3–1	1–0	1–2	1–3
Melbourne City	4–3	2–0	4–2	2–2		1–1	4–1	5–2	2–1	2–1	2–0	5–1
Melbourne Victory	2–1	2–0	2–0	2–0	2–3		4–3	1–0	2–0	1–1	4–4	4–1
Newcastle Jets	3–3	1–6	2–2	1–2	0–2	0–2		2–1	1–0	1–0	2–2	0–2
Perth Glory	3–1	3–2	1–2	0–1	1–5	0–1	3–2		1–1	2–1	1–0	3–0
Sydney FC	2–3	3–2	2–0	0–0	1–1	0–1	1–2	1–0		2–1	1–0	1–2
Wellington Phoenix	1–3	2–1	0–1	0–2	0–1	1–1	3–2	2–0	2–0		2–1	1–1
Western Sydney Wanderers	0–2	2–1	1–3	1–3	0–1	0–1	4–1	1–1	0–2	0–3		5–1
Western United	1–3	2–8	4–3	0–0	1–1	1–2	2–0	4–1	2–1	4–2	4–1	

Source: A-League Women
Legend: Blue = home team win; Yellow = draw; Red = away team win.

Unite Round

Team 1	Score	Team 2
Adelaide United	0–1	Wellington Phoenix
Western Sydney Wanderers	0–4	Brisbane Roar
Central Coast Mariners	1–1	Melbourne Victory
Newcastle Jets	1–1	Western United
Canberra United	1–1	Perth Glory
Sydney FC	1–1	Melbourne City

== Finals series ==
The finals series will use the same format as A-League Men; run over four weeks, and involving the top six teams from the regular season. In the first week of fixtures, the third-through-sixth ranked teams play a single-elimination match, with the two winners of those matches joining the first and second ranked teams in two-legged semi-final ties. The two winners of those matches will meet in the Grand Final.

=== Bracket ===
Elimination-finals
4	Central Coast Mariners	2
5	Canberra United	1
3	Adelaide United	1
6	Western United	0

Semi-finals
1	Melbourne City	2	0	2
4	Central Coast Mariners (a.e.t.)	2	1	3
2	Melbourne Victory	3	3	6
3	Adelaide United	1	1	2

Grand Final
4	Central Coast Mariners	1 (5)
2	Melbourne Victory	1 (4)

=== Elimination-finals ===
27 April 2025
15:30 ACST (UTC+09:30)

Adelaide United	1–0	Western United
McNamara 24'	Report

Coopers Stadium, Adelaide
Attendance: 3,143
Referee: Molly Godsell

28 April 2025 (Note: Originally scheduled for 27 April, this match was postponed and rescheduled due to a waterlogged pitch.)
18:00 AEST (UTC+10:00)

Central Coast Mariners	2–1	Canberra United
Pennock 46', 74'	Report	Heyman 43'

Industree Group Stadium, Gosford
Attendance: 1,502
Referee: Izzy Cooper

=== Semi-finals ===
==== Summary ====
Team 1	Agg.	Team 2	1st leg	2nd leg
Melbourne City	2–3	Central Coast Mariners	2–2	0–1 (a.e.t.)
Melbourne Victory	6–2	Adelaide United	3–1	3–1

==== Matches ====
3 May 2025
14:15 AEST (UTC+10:00)

Central Coast Mariners	2–2	Melbourne City
Nunn 20', 54'	Report	McKenna 29'; Henry 35'

Industree Group Stadium, Gosford
Attendance: 1,934
Referee: Georgia Ghirardello
11 May 2025
17:00 AEST (UTC+10:00)

Melbourne City	0–1 (a.e.t.)	Central Coast Mariners
	Report	Gomez 120+1'

ctrl:cyber Pitch, Melbourne
Attendance: 578
Referee: Molly Godsell

Central Coast Mariners won 3–2 on aggregate.

4 May 2025
15:30 ACST (UTC+09:30)

Adelaide United	1–3	Melbourne Victory
Healy 40'	Report	Gielnik 38'; Bunge 77', 88'

Coopers Stadium, Adelaide
Attendance: 4,372
Referee: Caitlin Williams
10 May 2025
17:15 AEST (UTC+10:00)

Melbourne Victory	3–1	Adelaide United
Lowe 11', 78'; D'Appolonia 61'	Report	Hodgson 90+6'

Home of the Matildas, Melbourne
Attendance: 1,314
Referee: Izzy Cooper

Melbourne Victory won 6–2 on aggregate.

=== Grand Final ===
18 May 2025
15:15 AEST (UTC+10:00)

Melbourne Victory	1–1 (a.e.t.)	Central Coast Mariners
Bunge 80'	Report	Gomez 46'
Penalties
Jancevski (penalty missed); Gielnik (penalty scored); Chidiac (penalty scored); Furphy (penalty scored); Morrison (penalty scored)	4–5	(penalty scored) Fuller; (penalty scored) Trimis; (penalty scored) Pennock; (penalty scored) Gomez; (penalty scored) Galic

AAMI Park, Melbourne
Attendance: 6,568
Referee: Izzy Cooper

== Regular season statistics ==
=== Top scorers ===
Rank	Player	Club	Goals
1	(Australia) Holly McNamara	Melbourne City	15
2	(Australia) Emily Gielnik	Melbourne Victory	12
2	(Australia) Tameka Yallop	Brisbane Roar	12
4	(England) Fiona Worts	Adelaide United	11
5	(Australia) Laini Freier	Brisbane Roar	9
6	(Australia) Chelsie Dawber	Adelaide United	8
6	(Australia) Kahli Johnson	Western United	8
8	(Republic of Ireland) Erin Healy	Adelaide United	7
8	(Australia) Michelle Heyman	Canberra United	7
8	(Australia) Chloe Logarzo	Western United	7
8	(Australia) Sienna Saveska	Western Sydney Wanderers	7
8	(Venezuela) Mariana Speckmaier	Melbourne City	7

=== Hat-tricks ===
Player	For	Against	Result	Date	Ref.
(Australia) Emily Gielnik	Melbourne Victory	Western United	4–1 (H)	17 November 2024	
(Australia) Sienna Saveska	Western Sydney Wanderers	Western United	5–1 (H)	14 December 2024	
(Australia) Laini Freier	Brisbane Roar	Newcastle Jets	6–1 (A)	21 December 2024	
(Australia) Laini Freier	Brisbane Roar	Western United	8–2 (A)	29 December 2024	
(Australia) Holly McNamara	Melbourne City	Western United	5–1 (H)	4 February 2025	
(Australia) Holly McNamara	Melbourne City	Adelaide United	4–3 (H)	16 March 2025	
(Australia) Tameka Yallop	Brisbane Roar	Western Sydney Wanderers	4–4 (H)	13 April 2025	

Key
(H)	Home team
(A)	Away team

=== Clean sheets ===
Rank	Goalkeeper	Club	Clean sheets
1	(Australia) Courtney Newbon	Melbourne Victory	11
2	(Australia) Claudia Jenkins	Adelaide United	7
2	(Spain) Malena Mieres	Melbourne City	7
4	(Australia) Sarah Langman	Central Coast Mariners	6
4	(United States) Olivia Sekany	Brisbane Roar	6
6	(Australia) Sally James	Canberra United	5
7	(Portugal) Carolina Vilão	Wellington Phoenix	4
8	(New Zealand) Brianna Edwards	Sydney FC	3
8	(Australia) Jasmine Black	Sydney FC	3
10	(Australia) Alyssa Dall'Oste	Western United	2
10	(Australia) Casey Dumont	Perth Glory	2
10	(Australia) Chloe Lincoln	Western United	2
10	(Australia) Tiahna Robertson	Newcastle Jets	2

== End-of-season awards ==
The following awards were announced at the 2024–25 Dolan Warren Awards night that took place on 27 May 2025.

- Julie Dolan Medal – Alex Chidiac (Melbourne Victory)
- Young Footballer of the Year – Indiana Dos Santos (Sydney FC)
- Golden Boot Award – Holly McNamara (Melbourne City) (15 goals)
- Goalkeeper of the Year – Sarah Langman (Central Coast Mariners)
- Coach of the Year – Adrian Stenta (Adelaide United)
- Referee of the Year – Izzy Cooper
- Fair Play Award – Melbourne City
- Goal of the Year – Alana Jancevski (Melbourne Victory v Sydney FC, 24 January 2025)
- Save of the Year – Claudia Jenkins (Adelaide United)
- Playmaker of the Year – Sophie Hoban (Newcastle Jets)
- Fan Player of the Year – Isabel Gomez (Central Coast Mariners)

=== Club awards ===
Club	Player of the Season	Ref.
Adelaide United	(Republic of Ireland) Erin Healy	
Brisbane Roar	(Australia) Tameka Yallop	
Canberra United	(New Zealand) Elizabeth Anton	
Central Coast Mariners	(Australia) Taylor Ray	
Melbourne City	(United States) Taylor Otto	
Melbourne Victory	(United States) Kayla Morrison	
Newcastle Jets	(Australia) Sophie Hoban	
Perth Glory	(Australia) Isobel Dalton	
Sydney FC	(Australia) Natalie Tobin	
Wellington Phoenix	(New Zealand) Annalie Longo	
Western Sydney Wanderers	(Australia) Sham Khamis	
Western United	(United States) Catherine Zimmerman	

== See also ==
- 2024–25 A-League Men
- 2025 A-League Women Grand Final
- A-League Women transfers for 2024–25 season
- 2024–25 Adelaide United FC (women) season
- 2024–25 Brisbane Roar FC (women) season
- 2024–25 Canberra United FC (women) season
- 2024–25 Central Coast Mariners FC (women) season
- 2024–25 Melbourne City FC (women) season
- 2024–25 Melbourne Victory FC (women) season
- 2024–25 Newcastle Jets FC (women) season
- 2024–25 Perth Glory FC (women) season
- 2024–25 Sydney FC (women) season
- 2024–25 Wellington Phoenix FC (women) season
- 2024–25 Western Sydney Wanderers FC (women) season
- 2024–25 Western United FC (women) season
