= Unite Round =

A-Leagues weekend in which all fixtures are played in one city

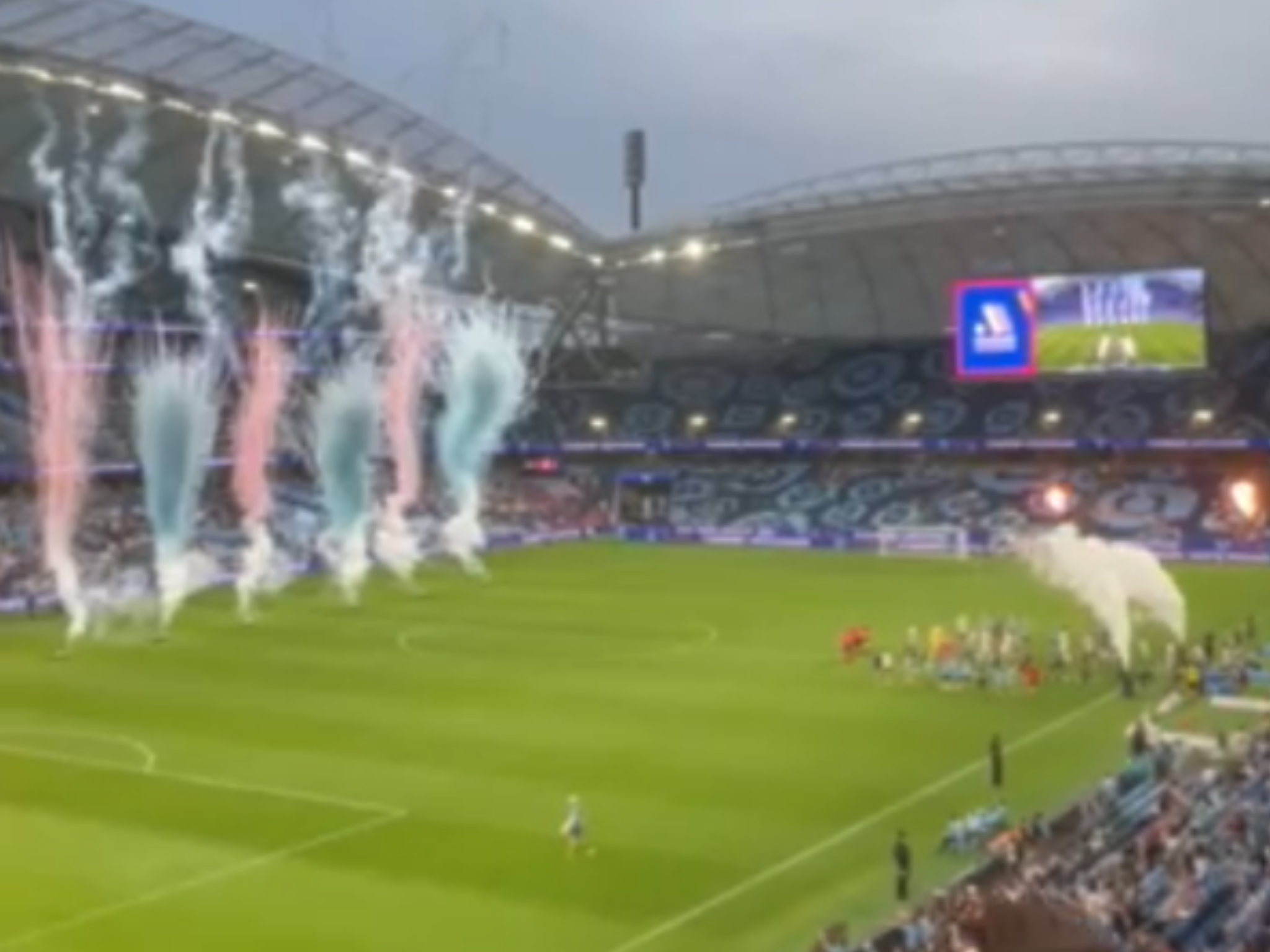
Unite Round pre-game between Adelaide United and Sydney FC at Allianz Stadium in January 2024.

Unite Round was an A-Leagues event in which all fixtures were played in one city for one week during the A-League Men's and Women's season. The event was held twice during the 2023–24 and 2024–25 A-Leagues seasons in Sydney, in partnership with Destination NSW. It was not renewed for the 2025–26 season.

== Background ==
In December 2022, the Australian Professional Leagues made a decision to move the following three A-Leagues Grand Finals (2023, 2024 and 2025) which would be hosted in Sydney in a deal with Destination NSW. The decision was met with universal backlash from fans and clubs. The decision had the possibility of being reversed during September 2023, in response to the unpopularity with the fans on the decision, and the potential to be replaced with a "Magic Round–style" event.

== History ==
On 18 October 2023, the Australian Professional Leagues officially reversed the decision on the Grand Final hosts, renegotiating the contract into a Unite Round as a replacement.

It was first held in January 2024, with twelve fixtures of all participating A-League Men and Women teams in the 2023–24 season, played at three stadiums (Allianz Stadium, CommBank Stadium, and Leichhardt Oval). As Unite Round was introduced after the release of the 2023–24 A-Leagues fixtures, the 2023–24 Unite Round event changed fixture details in certain match weeks of both the A-League Men's and Women's original fixture lists. The men's Unite Round fixtures were used as an additional match week (Round 27) to the regular season, and the women's Unite Round fixtures replaced the existing match week of Round 12 where the venues and times were changed to the specific Unite Round details. The 2023–24 Unite Round event attracted a total attendance of 47,425.

A second Unite Round (as part of the 2024–25 A-Leagues seasons) was played during November 2024, using Allianz Stadium and Leichhardt Oval. Due to the 2024–25 A-League Men season having an odd number of teams, this meant Melbourne City received a bye for this event. The Unite Round hosted two derbies for the first time, those being the F3 Derby and Sydney Derby.

On 25 July 2025, it was announced that the Unite Round would not held for the upcoming season.

== List of Unite Rounds ==
Season	Dates	City	Venues (matches)	Attendance		
Season	Dates	City	Venues (matches)	Men	Women	Total
2023–24	12–14 January 2024	Sydney	Allianz Stadium (4), CommBank Stadium (4), Leichhardt Oval (4)	36,203	11,222	47,425
2024–25	22–24 November 2024	Sydney	Allianz Stadium (6), Netstrata Jubilee Stadium (6)	61,911	9,394	71,305

== Matches ==
All times are in AEDT

=== 2023–24 ===
==== A-League Men ====
12 January 2024	Macarthur FC	3–3	Western United	CommBank Stadium
17:30	Dávila 32', 51', 90'	Report	Garuccio 3'; Penha 74', 85'	Attendance: 3,441; Referee: Adam Kersey

12 January 2024	Melbourne City	0–1	Western Sydney Wanderers	CommBank Stadium
19:45		Report	Pierias 27'	Attendance: 7,117; Referee: Jonathon Barreiro

13 January 2024	Central Coast Mariners	1–1	Melbourne Victory	Allianz Stadium
16:45	Reec 89'	Report	Arzani 33' (pen.)	Attendance: 8,147; Referee: Ben Abraham

13 January 2024	Adelaide United	4–3	Sydney FC	Allianz Stadium
19:30	Ibusuki 24', 34', 73'; Irankunda 50'	Report	Caceres 7'; Lolley 76', 90+5'	Attendance: 11,918; Referee: Alex King

14 January 2024	Perth Glory	3–4	Wellington Phoenix	CommBank Stadium
19:15	Taggart 7'; Susnjar 50'; Carluccio 70'	Report	Barbarouses 29', 73'; Rufer 45+2'; Paine 57'	Attendance: 1,632; Referee: Tim Danaskos

14 January 2024	Brisbane Roar	3–2	Newcastle Jets	Allianz Stadium
19:15	O'Shea 61', 90' (pen.); Markovski 82'	Report	Stamatelopoulos 18'; Cancar 65'	Attendance: 3,948; Referee: Jack Morgan

==== A-League Women ====
12 January 2024	Melbourne Victory	1–1	Perth Glory	Leichhardt Oval
16:30	Lowe 28'	Report	Rankin 60' (o.g.)	Attendance: 1,130; Referee: Caitlin Williams

12 January 2024	Wellington Phoenix	1–2	Central Coast Mariners	Leichhardt Oval
19:15	Main 3'	Report	Badawiya 23'; Trimis 34'	Attendance: 1,938; Referee: Bec Mackie

13 January 2024	Canberra United	3–1	Adelaide United	Leichhardt Oval
16:30	Michelle Heyman 50', 51'; Milivojević 64'	Report	Hodgson 46'	Attendance: 1,183; Referee: Rebecca Durcau

13 January 2024	Brisbane Roar	1–2	Newcastle Jets	Leichhardt Oval
19:15	Corbin 65'	Report	Bolden 63'; Yallop 77' (o.g.)	Attendance: 1,417; Referee: Isabella Libri

14 January 2024	Western Sydney Wanderers	1–0	Melbourne City	CommBank Stadium
16:30	Caspers 67'	Report		Attendance: 1,515; Referee: Isabella Blaess

14 January 2024	Western United	0–1	Sydney FC	Allianz Stadium
16:30		Report	Vine 70'	Attendance: 4,039; Referee: Casey Reibelt

=== 2024–25 ===
==== A-League Men ====
22 November 2024	Perth Glory	1–3	Western United	Allianz Stadium
17:00	Ostler 52'	Report	Leonard 60'; Ibusuki 65', 76'	Attendance: 2,425; Referee: Alireza Faghani

22 November 2024	Newcastle Jets	1–2	Central Coast Mariners	Allianz Stadium
19:30	Aquilina 64'	Report	Kaltak 66'; Šušnjar 75' (o.g.)	Attendance: 5,156; Referee: Shaun Evans

23 November 2024	Brisbane Roar	2–3	Adelaide United	Allianz Stadium
16:30	Jelacic 6'; O'Shea 43' (pen.)	Report	Mauk 33'; Clough 46'; Goodwin 62'	Attendance: 15,249; Referee: Alex King

23 November 2024	Sydney FC	4–2	Western Sydney Wanderers	Allianz Stadium
19:05	Lolley 33'; Courtney Perkins 48'; Ouhaim 54' (pen.); Klimala 82'	Report	Sapsford 45+4'; Antonsson 78'	Attendance: 30,777; Referee: Daniel Elder

24 November 2024	Wellington Phoenix	1–0	Melbourne Victory	Allianz Stadium
13:00	Barbarouses 82'	Report		Attendance: 3,478; Referee: Casey Reibelt

24 November 2024	Macarthur FC	0–1	Auckland FC	Allianz Stadium
15:30		Report	May 34'	Attendance: 4,826; Referee: Ben Abraham

==== A-League Women ====
22 November 2024	Adelaide United	0–1	Wellington Phoenix	Netstrata Jubilee Stadium
17:00		Report	McCutcheon 45+3'	Attendance: 878; Referee: Isabella Mossin

22 November 2024	Western Sydney Wanderers	0–4	Brisbane Roar	Netstrata Jubilee Stadium
19:45		Report	Hayashi 18', 45+1'; Yallop 67'; Pringle 84'	Attendance: 1,398; Referee: Kelly Jones

23 November 2024	Central Coast Mariners	1–1	Melbourne Victory	Netstrata Jubilee Stadium
13:45	Morrison 85'	Report	Rasmussen 12'	Attendance: 1,238; Referee: Georgia Ghirardello

23 November 2024	Newcastle Jets	1–1	Western United	Netstrata Jubilee Stadium
16:30	Cicco 71'	Report	Maher 80'	Attendance: 1,494; Referee: Rebecca Durcau

24 November 2024	Canberra United	1–1	Perth Glory	Netstrata Jubilee Stadium
13:00	Stanic-Floody 69'	Report	Dalton 41'	Attendance: 1,237; Referee: Beth Rattray

24 November 2024	Sydney FC	1–1	Melbourne City	Netstrata Jubilee Stadium
15:45	Hawkesby 6'	Report	Bosch 11'	Attendance: 3,149; Referee: Rachael Mitchenson

== See also ==
- Gather Round, the equivalent event in the Australian Football League since 2023
- Magic Round, the equivalent event in the National Rugby League since 2019
- Super Round, the equivalent event in the Super Rugby Pacific since 2022
