= Imane Chebel =

Algerian footballer (born 1995)

Personal information
- Date of birth: 25 March 1995 (age 31)
- Place of birth: Quebec City, Quebec, Canada
- Position: Defender

College career
Years	Team	Apps	(Gls)
	Concordia Stingers	0	(0)

Senior career*
Years	Team	Apps	(Gls)
2019–2021	BIIK Kazygurt	7	(0)
2021–2022	Fleury	11	(1)
2022–2023	Brest	14	(0)
2023–2024	Arna-Bjørnar	8	(0)
2024	Flamengo	0	(0)
2024-	Wellington Phoenix	0	(0)

International career^{‡}
2018–	Algeria	19	(2)
- * Club domestic league appearances and goals ‡ National team caps and goals as of 2 April 2024

Imane Chebel (Arabic: إيمان شبال; born 25 March 1995) is a footballer who last played as a defender for A-League Women club Wellington Phoenix. Born in Canada, she plays for the Algeria women's national team.

== Club career ==
In July 2021, Chebel joined Division 1 Féminine side Fleury.

In July 2022, Chebel moved to Division 2 Féminine side Stade Brestois 29 from Fleury.

On 1 April 2024, Flamengo announced the signing of Chebel from Norwegian Arna-Bjørnar until the end of the season.

In November 2024, Chebel joined New Zealand A-League Women club Wellington Phoenix. Two weeks after signing for the club they decided mutually to part ways due to unforeseen circumstances.

== International career ==
In March 2018, Chebel got her first call-up to the national senior team by coach Azzedine Chih to participate in the First round of 2018 Women's Africa Cup of Nations qualification against Senegal. On 4 April 2018, she debuted for the national team as a starter against Senegal. With the team qualifying for the 2018 Africa Women Cup of Nations, she was selected by coach Radia Fertoul to be part of the final squad. However, she only played in one match. On 20 September 2023, she scored her first international goal in a 2–1 win against Uganda as part of the 2024 Women's Africa Cup of Nations qualification.

== Career statistics ==
As of match played 27 February 2024

Appearances and goals by national team and year
National team	Year	Apps	Goals
Algeria	2018	7	0
Algeria	2019	2	0
Algeria	2020	0	0
Algeria	2021	2	0
Algeria	2022	2	0
Algeria	2023	6	2
Algeria	2024	0	0
Total		19	2

Scores and results list Algeria's goal tally first, score column indicates score after each Chebel goal.

List of international goals scored by Imane Chebel
No.	Date	Venue	Opponent	Score	Result	Competition
1	20 September 2023	FUFA Technical Centre, Njeru, Uganda	Uganda	1–1	2–1	2024 Women's Africa Cup of Nations qualification
2	30 November 2023	Stade du 5 Juillet, Algiers, Algeria	Burundi	5–1	5–1	2024 Women's Africa Cup of Nations qualification
