= Olivia Sekany =

American soccer player (born 1998)

Personal information
- Full name: Olivia Jane Sekany
- Date of birth: December 29, 1998 (age 27)
- Place of birth: Livermore, California, United States
- Height: 6 ft 0 in (1.83 m)
- Position: Goalkeeper

Youth career
- Pleasanton Rage

College career
Years	Team	Apps	(Gls)
2017–2019	California Golden Bears	13	(0)
2020–2022	Washington Huskies	54	(0)

Senior career*
Years	Team	Apps	(Gls)
2023–2026	Racing Louisville	0	(0)
2024–2025	→ Brisbane Roar (loan)	17	(0)

International career
2016	United States U18		
- * Club domestic league appearances and goals as of 16:50, September 26, 2026 (UTC)

Olivia Jane Sekany (born December 29, 1998) is an American professional soccer player who plays as a goalkeeper. She played college soccer for the California Golden Bears and the Washington Huskies.

== Early life ==
Sekany is one of three children born to Jason and Amy Sekany. She grew up in Livermore, California. She attended Laurel Springs School and played club soccer for Elite Clubs National League team Pleasanton Rage.

== College career ==
=== California Golden Bears ===
Sekany attended the University of California, Berkeley and played for the California Golden Bears women's soccer team, where she redshirted her freshman year. She made 13 total appearances and played 953 minutes, saving 26 shots on target (57.8%) and recording two shutouts.

==== Abuse investigation ====
Sekany was among at least nine players to issue a formal complaint in 2019 of alleged verbal and emotional abuse, bullying, hazing, punitive overtraining, and retaliation against Cal head coach Neil McGuire, with accusations of misconduct dating to 2016. The players, including Sekany, publicized the allegations in November 2020, leading to more than 20 additional players to report additional allegations by December.

In April 2023, she was also one of three players to publicly criticize the university's response to their complaint. As of March 10, 2023, McGuire remained head coach at Cal.

=== Washington Huskies ===
After graduating from Cal early in order to leave the influence of McGuire, Sekany attended the University of Washington as a graduate-transfer redshirt junior and played for the Washington Huskies women's soccer team. The Huskies advanced to the 2020 NCAA Division I women's soccer tournament round of 16, which included Sekany making two saves and scoring a goal in a penalty shoot-out against Saint Louis. Sekany finished the season with a program-best 0.62 goals-against average, breaking a record previously held by Hope Solo. In her career with the Huskies, she played 4,826 minutes in 54 appearances, saving 152 shots on target (71.4%) and allowing 1.14 goals per match with 13 shutouts.

== Club career ==
Sekany registered for the 2023 NWSL Draft but was not selected. NWSL club Racing Louisville FC invited her to preseason camp in January 2023. On March 31, 2023, Sekany signed a one-year contract with Racing Louisville.

In October 2024, Sekany was loaned to Australian A-League Women club Brisbane Roar for the 2024–25 A-League Women season. Her loan ended in March 2025, and she was recalled to parent club Racing Louisville after keeping six clean sheets and making 47 saves for Brisbane Roar. Sekany spent the remainder of 2025 away from the field as she recuperated from a knee injury.

On January 20, 2026, Racing Louisville announced the re-signing of Sekany on a six-month contract through July 2026. She did not make a competitive appearance in her three years with Racing.

== Personal life ==
Olivia's mother Amy L. Sekany was appointed in 2018 by then-Governor Jerry Brown as a judge to the Alameda County Superior Court. Her father Jason Sekany was a second-round pick of the Boston Red Sox and played Minor League Baseball from 1996 to 2001.
