= Grace Kuilamu =

Australian soccer player (born 2007)

Personal information
- Date of birth: 13 March 2007 (age 19)
- Position: Forward

Team information
- Current team: Brisbane Roar
- Number: 10

Youth career
- –2019: Souths United
- 2019–2021: FQ QAS

Senior career*
Years	Team	Apps	(Gls)
2022–2023	FQ QAS	15	(5)
2023–	Brisbane Roar	20	(6)

International career^{‡}
2022	Australia U17	7	(3)
2025–	Australia U20	0	(0)
2025–	Australia	1	(0)
- * Club domestic league appearances and goals as of 20 June 2025 ‡ National team caps and goals as of 22 July 2025

Grace Kuilamu (Fijian: [ku.i.la.mu] KOO-i-lah-MOO; born 13 March 2007) is an Australian professional soccer player who plays as a forward for A-League Women club Brisbane Roar and the Australia national team. Kuilamu is the second player of Pacific Islander descent, male or female, to represent Australia at senior level. (Note: While Mary Fowler is of Papua New Guinean descent, Papuans are generally not classified as Pacific Islanders.)

== Early life ==
Kuilamu was born in 2007 into a Christian household in Brisbane to a Fijian father, Reverend Ilaitia Kuilamu (who hails from the village of Navidamu in the province of Macuata) and a Romanian mother, Oana. She has five older siblings, though she was the first in her family to pursue soccer. She previously played rugby union, beginning at age 10.

Kuilamu's parents ran the Brisbane branch of the Christian Mission Fellowship. She attended Sunnybank Hills State School and Brisbane State High School, where she had high grades. As a child she played with Souths United in the Football Queensland Premier League until 12-years-old. Kuilamu joined Football Queensland's Academy of Sport/National Training Centre (FQ QAS/FQ NTC) under-13s in the National Premier Leagues Queensland.

== Club career ==
Kuilamu continued as a forward with FQ QAS seniors team during National Premier Leagues Women's (NPLW) 2022–23 season. She was awarded a scholarship in September 2023 ahead of the 2023–24 season by A-League Women club Brisbane Roar. On 15 October 2023 she appeared in their 2–1 win against Melbourne Victory. She kicked a goal upon debut and became the youngest Brisbane Roar scorer of all-time at 16 years 216 days. During the 2024–25 season she appeared 18 times for Brisbane and kicked five goals.

== International career ==
Kuilamu received her first callup for the Australia national team on 20 June 2025, when she was named in the extended squad for two friendlies against Panama on 5 and 8 July in Perth and Bunbury, respectively. She made her debut appearance in the match in Bunbury, becoming the first Australian of Pacific Islander descent (male or female) to represent Australia.

== Playing style ==
Kuilamu has been described as a bright young talent in Australian soccer, having been compared to Matildas and Manchester City forward Mary Fowler when she was as young as 17. She aspires to play at the FIFA Women's World Cup and to play overseas, namely in the Women's Super League (WSL) in England (though without a particular club in mind).
