= Daisy Brown =

Australian soccer player (born 2006)

Personal information
- Date of birth: 13 July 2006 (age 20)
- Place of birth: Australia
- Height: 1.75 m (5 ft 9 in)
- Position: Forward

Team information
- Current team: Brisbane Roar
- Number: 3

Youth career
- Queensland Academy of Sport

Senior career*
Years	Team	Apps	(Gls)
2025–	Brisbane Roar	17	(8)

International career
2022–2024	Australia U18		
2026	Australia U20	3	(2)
- * Club domestic league appearances and goals as of 10 May 2026

Daisy Brown (born 13 July 2006) is an Australian professional soccer player who currently plays as a forward for A-League Women club Brisbane Roar.

== Early life ==
Brown was born 13 July 2006. Born in Australia, she grew up in Sydney, Australia, Singapore, and Queensland, Australia.

== Club career ==
As a youth player, Brown joined the youth academy of Queensland Academy of Sport. Following her stint there, she signed for Brisbane Roar in 2025, helping the club reach the semi-finals of the 2025–26 A-League Women.

== International career ==
Brown is an Australia youth international. During the spring of 2026, she played for the Australia women's national under-20 soccer team at the 2026 AFC U-20 Women's Asian Cup.
