= Laini Freier =

Australian soccer player

Personal information
- Date of birth: 24 July 2001 (age 25)
- Place of birth: Redcliffe, Queensland, Australia
- Position: Midfielder

Youth career
- Moreton Bay

Senior career*
Years	Team	Apps	(Gls)
2018–2019	Brisbane Roar/NTC		
2020–2021	The Gap FC		
2022	Moreton Bay		
2023–2024	Brisbane City		
2024–2025	Brisbane Roar	17	(9)
2025	Brisbane City		

International career^{‡}
2025	Australia	1	(0)
- * Club domestic league appearances and goals as of 3 February 2025 ‡ National team caps and goals as of 24 February 2025

Laini Freier (German: [ˈfʁaɪ̯ɐ] FRY-er; born 24 July 2001) is an Australian retired professional soccer player who most notably played as a winger for A-League Women club Brisbane Roar and represented the Australia women's national team (the Matildas).

She is the twin sister of VfL Wolfsburg and Matildas player Sharn Freier. The two played at Brisbane Roar together in the 2024–25 A-League Women season.

Laini retired, aged 24, from both international and club soccer at the end of 2025. She indicated that she would be focusing on her family life and work career.

== Early and personal life ==
Twin sisters Laini and Sharn Freier were born in 2001 and grew up in Pine Rivers, Queensland and attended Pine Rivers State High School. She began playing soccer at the age of five. Freier joined Moreton Bay United juniors.

She married in August 2025.

== Career ==
=== Domestic ===
Freier's first state level club was Brisbane Roar/NTC (National Training Centre) for the 2018–19 seasons in the National Premier Leagues Queensland. She followed with stints at The Gap during 2020 and 2021, Moreton Bay United (senior women) in 2022 and Brisbane City in 2023 and 2024.

On 11 September 2024 she transferred as a midfielder from Brisbane City to Brisbane Roar in the A-League Women ahead of 2024–25 season. She appeared 17 times for Brisbane Roar and provided 9 goals. She scored a hat-trick in her debut game against Newcastle Jets on 21 December 2024. Freier followed with another hat-trick in their next game, against Western United. After the A-League season, she returned to Brisbane City the rest of 2025.

=== International ===
In February 2025, Freier received her first senior call up to the Australian national team for the 2025 SheBelieves Cup in the United States, earning her first cap against the USWNT.
