= Ashlee Brodigan =

Australian football player

Personal information
- Full name: Ashlee Brodigan
- Date of birth: 19 September 1999 (age 27)
- Place of birth: Australia
- Position: Forward

Senior career*
Years	Team	Apps	(Gls)
2015–2019	Newcastle Jets	16	(0)
2021–2023	Newcastle Jets	30	(5)
2023–2024	Brisbane Roar	11	(1)

International career
2014	Australia U-17		
2014–	Australia U-20		
- * Club domestic league appearances and goals as of 28 May 2024

Ashlee Brodigan (born 19 September 1999) is an Australian football (soccer) player, who last played for Brisbane Roar in the Australian A-League Women. She has previously played for Newcastle Jets.

== Club career ==
=== Newcastle Jets, 2015–2023 ===
Brodigan signed with Newcastle Jets in 2015. She made her debut for the team during a match against Perth Glory on 24 October 2015. During the 2015–16 W-League season, she made one appearance for Newcastle. The team finished in sixth place with a 3–5–4 record. In 2016, she was the youngest player in the Jets squad.

=== Brisbane Roar, 2023–2024 ===
In August 2023, Brodigan joined Brisbane Roar. At the end of the season, in September 2024, the club updated that she had departed.

== International career ==
Brodigan has represented Australia on the under-17 and under-20 national teams. During a match against Hong Kong in October 2014, she scored four goals and was named player of the match.
