= Emily Pringle =

American soccer player (born 2001)

Personal information
- Full name: Emily Grace Pringle
- Date of birth: October 12, 2001 (age 25)
- Place of birth: Los Angeles, California, U.S.
- Height: 5 ft 5 in (1.65 m)
- Position: Defender

Youth career
- 2017–2019: LA Galaxy San Diego

College career
Years	Team	Apps	(Gls)
2019–2022	Penn Quakers	42	(1)
2023	UCLA Bruins	14	(0)

Senior career*
Years	Team	Apps	(Gls)
2024–2025	Brisbane Roar	23	(2)
2025	San Diego Wave	0	(0)
2025	Brooklyn FC	6	(0)
- * Club domestic league appearances and goals as of 00:41, October 23, 2025 (UTC)

Emily Grace Pringle (born October 12, 2001) is an American former professional soccer player who played as a defender. Pringle played college soccer for the Penn Quakers and the UCLA Bruins before starting her professional career with Australian club Brisbane Roar FC. She went on to also play for San Diego Wave FC of the National Women's Soccer League and USL Super League club Brooklyn FC.

== Early life ==
Pringle was born in Los Angeles, California, to James and Carolyn Pringle. She was the only player in her year to join Notre Dame High School's varsity soccer team as a freshman and went on to win one league championship with the team. Following a family move down south to San Diego, Pringle attended Cathedral Catholic High School. She was the soccer team's 2017/18 newcomer of the year and also participated in swim and surf. She played club soccer for LA Galaxy San Diego, where she was a two-year team captain.

== College career ==
=== Penn Quakers ===
In her first year at the University of Pennsylvania, Pringle played in 11 matches and started 6 of them. Operating primarily as a full back, she helped the Quakers' defensive unit record 4 clean sheets on the season. Pringle did not play as a sophomore, as the COVID-19 pandemic caused the Ivy League to cancel sports in 2020. However, the aborted season provided an unexpected outcome, as it led Pringle to assume a greater leadership role once the team re-formed for the 2021 season.

During her first season back playing, Pringle ended up appearing in 15 of the Quakers' 16 games, starting all that she played in. On October 2, 2021, she scored her first college goal in a 2–0 win over Cornell. Two weeks later, she was responsible for two assists in a 4–0 victory over Yale. Pringle's performances earned her a spot on the All-Ivy second team, her first Ivy League conference honor. She built on her success in 2022, starting a career-high 16 matches and playing 90 minutes in all except for three games. Pringle also was Penn's team captain in what would prove to be her final two years as a Quaker.

=== UCLA Bruins ===
With all NCAA athletes receiving the offer of an extra year of eligibility due to the canceled 2020 season, Pringle planned to play a fifth year of college soccer. However, with the Ivy League's rules barring graduate students from participating in athletics, Pringle was forced to seek alternative options. She entered the transfer portal, eyeing a move back home to California. The UCLA Bruins soon came into the picture, and Pringle finished her college career back in her hometown of Los Angeles. She made 14 appearances and combined with the Bruins' backline to record10 shutouts across the season. She played a UCLA career-high 70 minutes against rivals USC in November 2023.

== Club career ==
On August 23, 2024, Pringle signed her first professional contract with Australian club Brisbane Roar FC. As an individual with an Australian father, this was yet another opportunity for Pringle to return to her roots. She scored her first professional goal exactly one month after signing with Brisbane Roar, tallying in a 4–0 victory over the Western Sydney Wanderers. In March 2025, she agreed to re-sign with Brisbane for another season. Despite having gotten off to a strong start at the beginning of the campaign, the Roar's qualification to the 2024–25 finals series later appeared dubious. Pringle appeared and recorded an assist in Brisbane's must-win, penultimate match of the season, but it was not enough as the Roar fought to a draw with Western Sydney and consequently fell outside of the A-League top 6.

Pringle made her way back to her old stomping grounds of San Diego in July 2025, signing a short-term national team replacement contract with National Women's Soccer League club San Diego Wave FC. Pringle, whose contract only included two midseason friendlies against the Utah Royals, did not make an NWSL appearance with the club in the short stint.

On August 8, 2025, Pringle joined Brooklyn FC ahead of its second season in the USL Super League. She made her Brooklyn debut on August 30, appearing in a 1–0 loss to Dallas Trinity FC. Pringle would go on to play in 6 games for Brooklyn FC before announcing her retirement from professional soccer on October 22, 2025.

== Personal life ==
Several of Pringle's family members have also found success in the world of sports. Her father, James, competed in two major tournaments with the Australian national swim team. Her sister, Anna, is a two-time Pac-12 champion with the Stanford Cardinal volleyball team. Her uncle, Andy Burke, also played soccer for UCLA; he scored the game-winning, overtime goal in the 1985 NCAA tournament final.

== Career statistics ==
=== Club ===
Appearances and goals by club, season and competition
Club	Season	League			Cup		Total	
Club	Season	Division	Apps	Goals	Apps	Goals	Apps	Goals
Brisbane Roar FC	2024–25	A-League	23	2	—		23	2
San Diego Wave FC	2025	NWSL	0	0	—		0	0
Brooklyn FC	2025–26	USL Super League	6	0	—		6	0
Career total			29	2	0	0	29	2
