= Sharn Freier =

Australian soccer player

Personal information
- Full name: Sharn Danielle Freier
- Date of birth: 24 July 2001 (age 25)
- Place of birth: Redcliffe, Australia
- Height: 1.64 m (5 ft 5 in)
- Position: Left winger

Team information
- Current team: Brisbane Roar
- Number: 11

Youth career
- 2014–2017: Moreton Bay United

Senior career*
| Years | Team | Apps | (Gls) |
| 2019–2020 | The Gap FC | 29 | (21) |
| 2020–2021 | Brisbane Roar | 1 | (0) |
| 2021–2022 | Moreton Bay United | 7 | (8) |
| 2022–2025 | Brisbane Roar | 54 | (7) |
| 2025–2026 | Wolfsburg II | 1 | (0) |
| 2025–2026 | Wolfsburg | 0 | (0) |
| 2025–2026 | → Brisbane Roar (loan) | 12 | (3) |
| 2026– | Brisbane Roar | 0 | (0) |

International career^{‡}
| 2024– | Australia | 9 | (2) |
- * Club domestic league appearances and goals as of 30 January 2026 ‡ National team caps and goals as of 17 December 2024

Sharn Danielle Freier (German: [ˈfʁaɪ̯ɐ] FRY-er; born 24 July 2001) is an Australian professional soccer player who plays as a left winger for A-League Women club Brisbane Roar and the Australia national team.

== Early life ==
Freier and her twin sister Laini Freier, grew up in Pine Rivers, Queensland and attended Pine Rivers State High School.

== Club career ==
=== Brisbane Roar ===
A product of The Gap FC, Freier first signed for Brisbane Roar in November 2020, where she made nine appearances and scored her first professional goal in a 6–0 win over Melbourne Victory. In April 2021, Freier re-joined her junior club Moreton Bay United. She missed the 2021–22 A-League Women season due to an ACL injury, and returned to Brisbane Roar for the 2022–23 A-League Women season During the season she made 16 appearances and signed a multi-year contract extension in September 2023. Her twin sister also played for Brisbane Roar during 2024–2025 season.She was signed on a permanent basis by Brisbane Roar for the 2026/27 season.

=== VfL Wolfsburg ===
On 21 January 2025, it was announced that Freier would join VfL Wolfsburg at the end of the 2024–25 A-League Women season, on a contract until 2028. In September 2025, Freier was loaned back to Brisbane Roar. In the announcement, she and the club mentioned her return to Australia being due to personal reasons.

== International career ==
On 28 March 2024, Freier was named in the Australia women's national soccer team squad as an injury replacement for the friendly match against Mexico on 9 April. During the match, she made her international debut, replacing Kyra Cooney-Cross late in the match.

Freier was named as an alternate to the national team for the 2024 Summer Olympics in France.

On 13 July 2024, Freier started for Australia in a closed-doors friendly against Canada, replacing an injured Caitlin Foord in the lineup. Freier scored for her team in the 2–1 defeat, but since the game was an unofficial match, it was not deemed as her first international goal. She scored her first official goal for Australia in the friendly 3–1 defeat against Chinese Taipei in December of that year.

== International goals ==
| No. | Date | Venue | Opponent | Score | Result | Competition |
|---|---|---|---|---|---|---|
| 1. | 4 December 2024 | AAMI Park, Melbourne, Australia | Chinese Taipei | 2–0 | 3–1 | Friendly |
| 2. | 7 December 2024 | Kardinia Park, Geelong, Australia | Chinese Taipei | 6–0 | 6–0 | Friendly |
