= Erin Healy (footballer) =

Irish-American soccer player (born 2001)

Personal information
- Full name: Erin Gianna Healy
- Date of birth: 5 April 2001 (age 25)
- Place of birth: San Diego, California, United States
- Position: Forward

Team information
- Current team: Parma
- Number: 11

College career
Years	Team	Apps	(Gls)
2019–2022	Gonzaga Bulldogs	67	(21)

Senior career*
Years	Team	Apps	(Gls)
2023–2024	Clube de Albergaria	24	(8)
2024–2026	Adelaide United	41	(12)
2026–	Parma	0	(0)

International career^{‡}
2025–	Republic of Ireland	1	(0)
- * Club domestic league appearances and goals as of 4 May 2026 ‡ National team caps and goals as of 4 May 2026

Erin Gianna Healy (Italian: [ˈdʒanna]; born 5 April 2001) is a professional soccer player who plays as a forward for Serie A club Parma. Born in the United States, she represents the Republic of Ireland internationally.

== Early life ==
Healy was born in San Diego, California. Her grandfather was born in Monaghan, which makes her eligible to represent either the Republic of Ireland or the United States internationally.

== College career ==
Healy attended Gonzaga University in Spokane, Washington, and played for the Gonzaga Bulldogs.

== Club career ==
Healy began her club football career in Portugal at Campeonato Nacional Feminino club Clube de Albergaria, joining in the 2023–24 season.

Healy moved to Australia to join A-League Women club Adelaide United for the 2024–25 season. In her first two seasons she scored 12 goals in 41 games. After two seasons, in which she won multiple annual awards, Healy departed Australia to pursue an opportunity in Europe.

On 27 July 2026, a few weeks after departing Adelaide, it was announced Healy had joined Italian Serie A club Parma until 2028.

== International career ==
Healy received her first call-up for the Republic of Ireland national team on 20 May 2025, when she was called up for two games against Turkey and Slovenia in the 2025 UEFA Women's Nations League. She made her international debut in Ireland's first of two friendlies against the United States in June 2025.

== Style of play ==
She is known for her composure when on the ball and for her strength in one-on-one battles.
