= Mariel Hecher =

Brazilian footballer (born 1992)

Mariel Hecher (born 19 October 1992) is a retired Brazilian footballer who played as a midfielder, winger or striker for Brisbane Roar.

== Early life ==
Hecher started playing futsal at the age of six.

== Education ==
Hecher attended Southern Cross University in Australia.

== Career ==
Hecher played for Australian side Lions FC, helping the club win the league. She has captained Australian side Brisbane Roar.

In April 2025, Hecher announced her retirement from football.

== Style of play ==
Hecher mainly operates as a midfielder, winger, or striker and has been described as a "creative forward, has an impressive work rate covering more than 13kms a game... a perfect combination of technical ability and competitive spirit".

== Personal life ==
Hecher has a brother. She is a native of Caxias do Sul, Brazil.
