= Momo Hayashi =

Japanese footballer (born 1995)

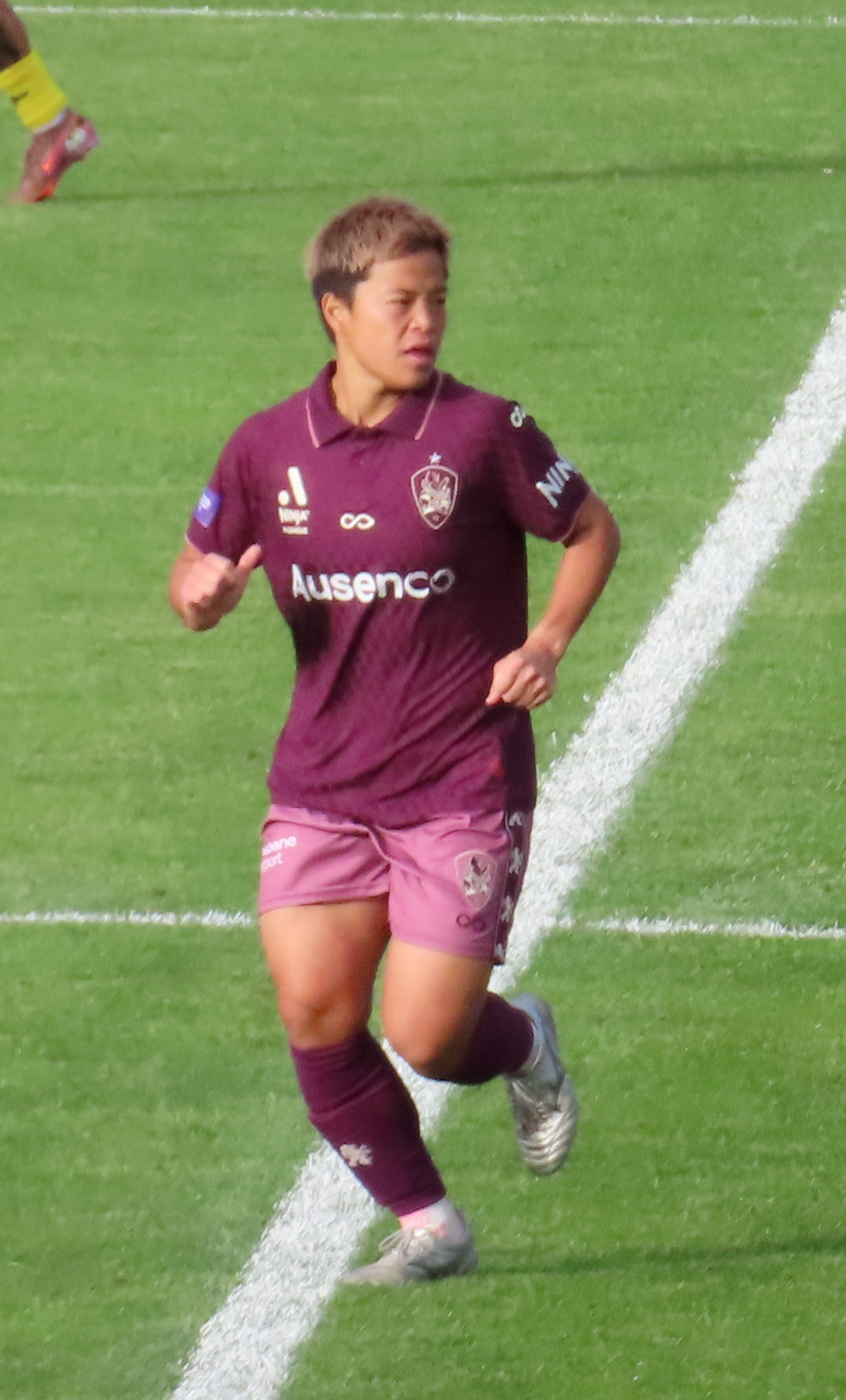
- Hayashi playing for Brisbane Roar in 2026

Personal information
- Date of birth: 27 March 1995 (age 31)
- Place of birth: Kyoto, Japan
- Height: 1.60 m (5 ft 3 in)
- Position: Midfielder

Team information
- Current team: Melbourne City
- Number: 8

Senior career*
Years	Team	Apps	(Gls)
- Speranza Osaka
- Okayama Yunogo Belle
2019–2024	Gold Coast United		
2024–2026	Brisbane Roar	38	(10)
2026–	Melbourne City	0	(0)
- * Club domestic league appearances and goals as of 6 September 2026

Momo Hayashi (林萌々, Hayashi Momo; pronounced [ha̠ja̠ɕi mo̞mo̞]; born 27 March 1995) is a Japanese professional footballer who plays as a midfielder for A-League Women club Melbourne City.

== Club career ==
Hayashi played for Japanese side Speranza Osaka. Following her stint there, she signed for Japanese side Okayama Yunogo Belle. Subsequently, she signed for Australian side Gold Coast United in 2019, where she was regarded as one of the club's most important players. Ahead of the 2024–25 season, she signed for Australian side Brisbane Roar. In August 2026, after two seasons with Brisbane Roar, Hayashi joined Melbourne City.

== Style of play ==
Hayashi plays as a midfielder. Australian newspaper Nichigo Press wrote in 2023 that "even though she is not particularly tall, she is able to play physically in a league that demands strength because of her low center of gravity that makes her strong enough not to be outmuscled, and her skill in reading the flow of the opponent's attack. Her versatility, as she can play in more attacking positions when needed, is also one of her strengths".
