= 2025–26 Melbourne Victory FC (women) season =

18th season in existence of Melbourne Victory FC (women)

Melbourne Victory (A-League Women)
2025–26 season
- Chairman: John Dovaston
- Manager: Jeff Hopkins
- Stadium: The Home of the Matildas; AAMI Park (doubleheaders)
- A-League Women: 6th
- A-League Women Finals: Semi-final
- Top goalscorer: League: Kennedy White (8 goals); All: Kennedy White (8 goals)
- Biggest win: 4–1 vs. Western Sydney Wanderers (A) (9 November 2025)
- Biggest defeat: 1–3 vs. Canberra United (H) (5 December 2025)
Home colours	Away colours
- All statistics correct as of 22 June 2025.

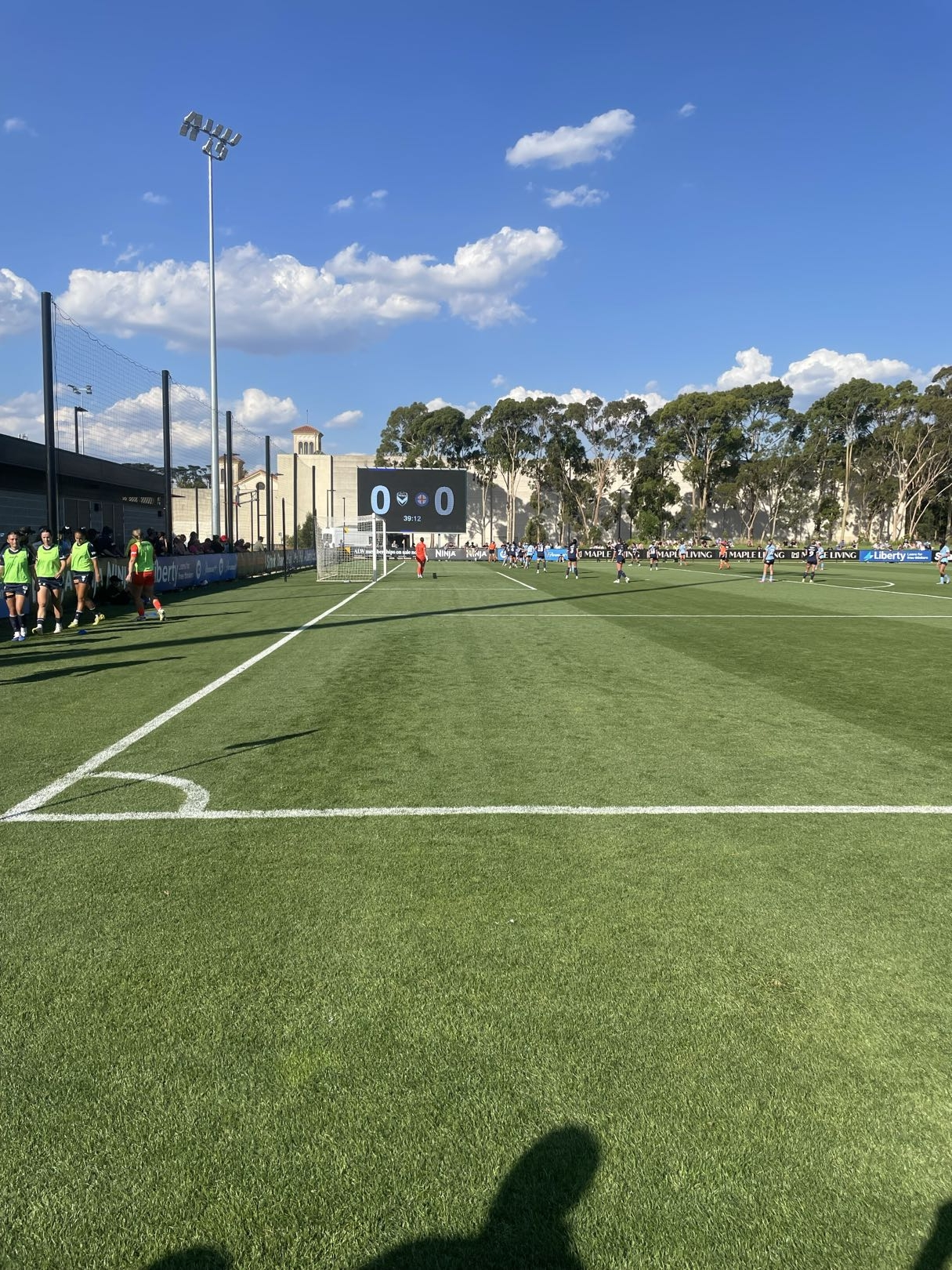
Victory playing Melbourne City at home on 15 February 2026.

The 2025–26 season was Melbourne Victory Football Club (women)'s 18th season in the A-League Women. Jeff Hopkins coached the squad and Kayla Morrison was the team's captain.

== Players ==
=== First-team squad ===
As of 29 October 2025

Note: Flags indicate national team as defined under FIFA eligibility rules; some limited exceptions apply. Players may hold more than one non-FIFA nationality.

No.	Pos.	Nation	Player
1	GK	AUS	Courtney Newbon
3	DF	NZL	Claudia Bunge (vice-captain)
4	DF	AUS	Chelsea Blissett
5	MF	AUS	Sofia Sakalis
6	MF	AUS	Taylor Ray
7	FW	AUS	Ella O'Grady
8	MF	AUS	Sienna Saveska
9	FW	AUS	Holly Furphy
10	MF	AUS	Rhianna Pollicina (vice-captain)
11	FW	AUS	Nickoletta Flannery
14	FW	AUS	Fiorina Iaria
16	FW	USA	Kennedy White
17	MF	AUS	Poppy O'Keeffe

No.	Pos.	Nation	Player
18	DF	USA	Kayla Morrison (captain)
19	DF	NZL	Zoe McMeeken
20	FW	AUS	Leyla Hussein
21	GK	AUS	Natalie Picak (youth)
23	MF	AUS	Rachel Lowe
24	MF	AUS	Laura Pickett
25	GK	AUS	Chloe McKenzie
27	MF	AUS	Rosie Curtis
28	FW	AUS	Sienna Techera
30	GK	USA	Payton Woodward
41	MF	AUS	Jessica Young
66	FW	AUS	Alana Jančevski
81	MF	AUS	Grace Maher

== Transfers ==
=== Transfers in ===
No.	Position	Player	From	Type/fee	Contract length	Date	Ref
6	MF	Taylor Ray	Central Coast Mariners	Free transfer	1 year	1 September 2025	
16	FW	(United States) Kennedy White	(Hungary) Győr	Free transfer	1 year	2 September 2025	
8	MF	Sienna Saveska	Unattached	Free transfer	1 year	2 September 2025	
4	DF	Chelsea Blissett	Unattached	Free transfer	1 year	3 September 2025	
14	FW	Fiorina Iaria	(Australia) Football Victoria Academy	Free transfer	1 year	5 September 2025	
30	GK	(United States) Payton Woodward	(Australia) Brunswick Juventus	Free transfer	1 year	5 September 2025	
25	GK	Chloe McKenzie	(Australia) Box Hill United	Free transfer	1 year	5 September 2025	
10	MF	Rhianna Pollicina	Unattached	Free transfer	1 year	6 September 2025	
19	DF	(New Zealand) Zoe McMeeken	Unattached	Free transfer	1 year	18 September 2025	
81	MF	Grace Maher	Unattached	Free transfer	1 year	24 September 2025	
21	GK	Natalie Picak	Unattached	Youth development agreement	1 year	6 October 2025	

==== From academy squad ====
N	Pos.	Nat.	Name	Age	Notes
28	FW	(Australia)	Sienna Techera	18	
41	MF	(Australia)	Jessica Young	21	
17	MF	(Australia)	Poppy O'Keeffe	17	
20	FW	(Australia)	Leyla Hussein	16	

=== Transfers out ===
No.	Position	Player	Transferred to	Type/fee	Date	Ref
15	FW	Emily Gielnik	(Mexico) Monterrey	End of contract	2 July 2025	
10	MF	Alex Chidiac	(Italy) Como	Undisclosed	24 July 2025	
8	MF	Alana Murphy	(Germany) SC Sand	End of contract	11 August 2025	
13	MF	(United States) Sara D'Appolonia	(Germany) SC Sand	End of contract	14 August 2025	
1	GK	Lydia Williams	Retired		28 August 2025	
2	DF	(England) Ellie Wilson	Unattached	End of contract	4 September 2025	
16	MF	Paige Zois	Unattached	End of contract	4 September 2025	
22	MF	Ava Briedis	Unattached	End of contract	4 September 2025	
62	GK	(New Zealand) Geo Candy	Unattached	End of contract	4 September 2025	
19	FW	Lia Privitelli	Retired		3 October 2025	

=== Contract extensions ===
No.	Player	Position	Duration	Date	Ref.
5	Sofia Sakalis	Attacking midfielder	1 year	20 August 2025	
9	Holly Furphy	Forward	1 year	20 August 2025	
66	Alana Jančevski	Forward	1 year	20 August 2025	
11	Nickoletta Flannery	Forward	1 year	26 August 2025	Was on loan during the off-season at Apollon Limassol.
23	Rachel Lowe	Midfielder	1 year	26 August 2025	
1	Courtney Newbon	Goalkeeper	1 year	26 August 2025	
7	Ella O'Grady	Forward	1 year	29 August 2025	
24	Laura Pickett	Right-back	1 year	29 August 2025	

== Pre-season and friendlies ==
11 October 2025	Melbourne Victory (Australia)	4–1	(Australia) Melbourne City	Melbourne, Australia
	Flannery 4' (?); Lowe 43'; White 60'	Report	McKenna (?)	Stadium: The Home of the Matildas

18 October 2025	Melbourne Victory (Australia)	1–1	(Australia) Adelaide United	Melbourne, Australia
	Lowe (?)	Report	Holmes (?)	Stadium: The Home of the Matildas

== Competitions ==
=== Overall record ===
Competition	First match	Last match	Final position	Record							
Competition	First match	Last match	Final position	Pld	W	D	L	GF	GA	GD	Win %
A-League Women	1 November 2025	3 April 2026	6th	20	8	4	8	27	24	+3	40.00
A-League Women Finals	25 April 2026	9 May 2026	Semi-final	3	1	0	2	3	3	+0	33.33
Total				23	9	4	10	30	27	+3	39.13

Last updated: 9 May 2026
Source: Competitions

=== A-League Women ===
==== League table ====
Pos	Team	Pld	W	D	L	GF	GA	GD	Pts	Qualification
4	Brisbane Roar	20	9	4	7	37	39	−2	31	Qualification for Finals series
5	Adelaide United	20	9	3	8	24	26	−2	30	Qualification for Finals series
6	Melbourne Victory	20	8	4	8	27	24	+3	28	Qualification for Finals series
7	Central Coast Mariners	20	7	7	6	27	26	+1	28	
8	Perth Glory	20	7	3	10	20	30	−10	24	

Source: A-Leagues
Rules for classification: 1) points; 2) goal difference; 3) goals scored; 4) wins; 5) head-to-head results; 5a) head-to-head points; 5b) head-to-head goal difference; 6) Fair Play points; 7) away goal difference; 8) away goals per match; 9) home goal difference; 10) home goals per match; 11) toss of a coin in an event of a tie of two clubs.

==== Results by round ====
Round	1	2	3	4	5	6	7	8	10	9	11	12	13	14	15	16	17	18	19	20	21	22
Ground	A	A	H	A	H	H	H	A	A	A	B	H	A	H	A	H	H	H	H	B	A	A
Result	L	W	W	L	W	L	W	W	L	D	X	L	L	D	L	W	D	D	W	X	L	W
Position	8	3	1	3	1	1	2	1	1	2	4	4	4	6	7	6	7	6	5	6	7	6
Points	0	3	6	6	9	9	12	15	15	16	16	16	16	17	17	20	21	22	25	25	25	28

Updated to match(es) played on 5 April 2026. Source:
A = Away; H = Home; N = Neutral; B = Bye; W = Win; D = Draw; L = Loss; X = Bye

==== Matches ====
Win Draw Loss

1 November 2025 1	Brisbane Roar	3–2	Melbourne Victory	Brisbane
17:00	Jansen 22'; Freier 64'; Yallop 86'	Report	Pollicina 34'; White 41'	Stadium: Imperial Corp Stadium; Attendance: 1,245; Referee: Izzy Cooper

9 November 2025 2	Western Sydney Wanderers	1–4	Melbourne Victory	Sydney
16:00	Matos 13'	Report	White 41', 45+1', 48'; McMeeken 83'	Stadium: Wanderers Football Park; Attendance: 986; Referee: Abbie Hendry

15 November 2025 3	Melbourne Victory	1–0	Central Coast Mariners	Melbourne
17:00	Pollicina 55'	Report		Stadium: Home of the Matildas; Attendance: 918; Referee: Caitlin Williams

23 November 2025 4	Wellington Phoenix	1–0	Melbourne Victory	Porirua
14:00	Vlok 38'	Report		Stadium: Porirua Park; Attendance: 772; Referee: Anna-Marie Keighley

30 November 2025 5	Melbourne Victory	3–0	Perth Glory	Melbourne
16:00	White 21'; Sakalis 36'; Pollicina 42'	Report		Stadium: Home of the Matildas; Referee: Mikayla Ryan

5 December 2025 6	Melbourne Victory	1–3	Canberra United	Melbourne
19:00	Robers 4' (o.g.)	Report	Sasaki 22'; Grove 55'; Morrison 77' (o.g.)	Stadium: Home of the Matildas; Attendance: 782; Referee: Rachel Mitchenson

13 December 2025 7	Melbourne Victory	1–0	Adelaide United	Melbourne
16:50	Lowe 50'	Report		Stadium: AAMI Park; Attendance: 2,004; Referee: Isabella Mossin

19 December 2025 8	Newcastle Jets	1–3	Melbourne Victory	Newcastle
19:00	L. Allan 81'	Report	White 25'; Pollicina 57'; Flannery 77'	Stadium: Newcastle Sports Ground No 2 Attendance: 1,145; Referee: Mikayla Ryan

23 December 2025 10	Melbourne City	2–1	Melbourne Victory	Melbourne
16:30	Bunge 65' (o.g.); McNamara 84'	Report	Pollicina 32'	Stadium: AAMI Park; Attendance: 1,323; Referee: Georgia Ghirardello

27 December 2025 9	Central Coast Mariners	3–3	Melbourne Victory	Gosford
17:00	Trimis 31'; Rasmussen 53', 61'	Report	Pollicina 90+1'; Sakalis 90+3'; O'Grady 90+4'	Stadium: polytec Stadium; Attendance: 1,427; Referee: Page Malau-Aduli

11 January 2026 12	Melbourne Victory	0–1	Brisbane Roar	Melbourne
17:00		Report	Brown 56'	Stadium: Home of the Matildas; Attendance: 1,008; Referee: Caitlin Williams

17 January 2026 13	Adelaide United	2–1	Melbourne Victory	Adelaide
16:50	Worts 38'; Zois 56'	Report	White 48'	Stadium: Coopers Stadium; Attendance: 6,477; Referee: Isabella Mossin

25 January 2026 14	Melbourne Victory	0–0	Sydney FC	Melbourne
17:00		Report		Stadium: Home of the Matildas; Attendance: 1,056; Referee: Jock Quartermain

1 February 2026 15	Canberra United	3–1	Melbourne Victory	Canberra
14:00	Grove 62'; Stanić-Floody 64'; Bertolissio 75'	Report	White 49'	Stadium: McKellar Park; Referee: Bec Mackie
Note: Due to an extreme heat forecast, the match was postponed by a day from its original date, 31 January 2026.

7 February 2026 16	Melbourne Victory	2–1	Newcastle Jets	Melbourne
17:00	Cicco 64' (o.g.); Furphy 82'	Report	Brown 74' (pen.)	Stadium: Home of the Matildas; Attendance: 871; Referee: Georgia Ghirardello

15 February 2026 17	Melbourne Victory	0–0	Melbourne City	Melbourne
17:00		Report		Stadium: Home of the Matildas; Attendance: 1,566; Referee: Sophie Allum

20 February 2026 18	Melbourne Victory	1–1	Wellington Phoenix	Melbourne
19:00	Pollicina 52' (pen.)	Report	Woods 87'	Stadium: Home of the Matildas; Attendance: 512; Referee: Mikayla Ryan

14 March 2026 19	Melbourne Victory	1–0	Western Sydney Wanderers	Melbourne
18:00	Furphy 57'	Report		Stadium: Home of the Matildas; Attendance: 901; Referee: Sophie Allum

28 March 2026 21	Sydney FC	2–1	Melbourne Victory	Sydney
17:00	Tanner 31', 49'	Report	Lowe 23'	Stadium: Leichhardt Oval; Attendance: 2,107; Referee: Isabella Mossin

3 April 2026 22	Perth Glory	0–1	Melbourne Victory	Perth
19:00		Report	Bunge 22'	Stadium: Sam Kerr Football Centre; Attendance: 952; Referee: Caitlin Williams

==== Finals series ====
25 April 2026 Elimination-final	Canberra United	1–3	Melbourne Victory	Canberra
14:00 AEST	Grove 29'	Report	Lowe 21'; O'Grady 24', 51'	Stadium: McKellar Park; Attendance: 3,290; Referee: Caitlin Williams

2 May 2026 Semi-final 1st leg	Melbourne Victory	0–1	Melbourne City	Melbourne
17:00 AEST		Report	McKenna 45'	Stadium: AAMI Park; Attendance: 4,953; Referee: Sophie Allum

9 May 2026 Semi-final 2nd leg	Melbourne City	1–0 (2–0 agg.)	Melbourne Victory	Melbourne
14:00 AEST	McMahon 34'	Report		Stadium: ctrl:cyber Pitch; Attendance: 1,607; Referee: Mikayla Ryan

== Statistics ==
=== Appearances and goals ===
Includes all competitions. Players with no appearances not included in the list.

As of match played 9 May 2026

No.	Pos	Nat	Player	Total		A-League Women		A-League Women Finals	
No.	Pos	Nat	Player	Apps	Goals	Apps	Goals	Apps	Goals
1	GK	(Australia) AUS	Courtney Newbon	23	0	20	0	3	0
3	DF	(New Zealand) NZL	Claudia Bunge	22	1	18+1	1	3	0
4	DF	(Australia) AUS	Chelsea Blissett	9	0	5+2	0	2	0
5	MF	(Australia) AUS	Sofia Sakalis	21	2	19+1	2	0+1	0
6	MF	(Australia) AUS	Taylor Ray	19	0	13+3	0	3	0
7	FW	(Australia) AUS	Ella O'Grady	19	3	3+13	1	3	2
8	MF	(Australia) AUS	Sienna Saveska	8	0	3+4	0	0+1	0
9	FW	(Australia) AUS	Holly Furphy	23	2	19+1	2	3	0
10	MF	(Australia) AUS	Rhianna Pollicina	22	7	18+1	7	3	0
11	FW	(Australia) AUS	Nickoletta Flannery	7	1	0+4	1	0+3	0
16	FW	(United States) USA	Kennedy White	23	8	19+1	8	1+2	0
17	MF	(Australia) AUS	Poppy O'Keeffe	1	0	0+1	0	0	0
18	DF	(Australia) AUS	Kayla Morrison	23	0	20	0	3	0
19	DF	(New Zealand) NZL	Zoe McMeeken	6	1	6	1	0	0
23	MF	(Australia) AUS	Rachel Lowe	22	3	19	2	3	1
24	DF	(Australia) AUS	Laura Pickett	16	0	13+1	0	2	0
27	DF	(Australia) AUS	Rosie Curtis	9	0	4+5	0	0	0
28	FW	(Australia) AUS	Sienna Techera	12	0	0+12	0	0	0
41	MF	(Australia) AUS	Jessica Young	3	0	0+3	0	0	0
66	FW	(Australia) AUS	Alana Jančevski	22	0	15+5	0	1+1	0
81	MF	(Australia) AUS	Grace Maher	15	0	6+6	0	3	0

=== Clean sheets ===
Includes all competitions. The list is sorted by squad number when total clean sheets are equal. Numbers in parentheses represent games where both goalkeepers participated and both kept a clean sheet; the number in parentheses is awarded to the goalkeeper who was substituted on, whilst a full clean sheet is awarded to the goalkeeper who was on the field at the start of play. Goalkeepers with no clean sheets not included in the list.

As of match played 9 May 2026

Rank	No.	Nat.	Goalkeeper	A-League Women	A-League Women Finals	Total
1	1	(Australia)	Courtney Newbon	7	0	7

== See also ==
- 2025–26 Melbourne Victory FC season
