= 2025 A-League Women grand final =

- Event: 2024–25 A-League Women
Melbourne Victory	Central Coast Mariners
1	1
- After extra time Central Coast Mariners won 5–4 on penalties
- Date: 18 May 2025
- Venue: AAMI Park, Melbourne
- Player of the Match: Isabel Gomez
- Referee: Isabella Cooper (South Australia)
- Attendance: 6,568
- Weather: Cloudy; 13 °C (55 °F); 48% humidity

The 2025 A-League Women grand final, known officially as the Ninja A-League Women grand final, was the soccer championship match between Melbourne Victory and Central Coast Mariners at AAMI Park in Melbourne on 18 May 2025. It was the 16th A-League Women grand final and the culmination of the 2024–25 season. Melbourne Victory placed second in the regular season and Central Coast Mariners placed fourth.

The match was broadcast live in Australia and New Zealand by Network 10 and Sky Sport respectively, as well as 10 Bold and Paramount+.

The match ended 1–1 after 90 minutes. After extra time the match remained 1–1, leading to a penalty shootout. Alana Jancevski missed the first penalty kick for Victory, and the rest of the penalties were scored, leading to a "fairytale" win for the Mariners in what was one of the greatest upsets in the competition's history. This was Central Coast Mariners' first A-League Women championship.

== Teams ==
Team	Previous grand final appearances (bold indicates winners)
Melbourne Victory	4 (2013, **2014 (Feb.)**, **2021**, **2022**)
Central Coast Mariners	0

== Route to the final ==
=== Melbourne Victory ===
Round	Melbourne Victory	
Regular season	**Runners-up**: Pos / Team / Pld / Pts; 1 / Melbourne City / 23 / **55**; **2** / Melbourne Victory / **23** / **53**; 3 / Adelaide United / 23 / **45**; 4 / Central Coast Mariners (C) / 23 / **34**; 5 / Canberra United / 23 / **33**; Source: A-Leagues (C) Champions	
Semi-finals	Opponent	Score
Semi-finals	Adelaide United	6–2 (agg.)

=== Central Coast Mariners ===
Round	Central Coast Mariners	
Regular season	**Fourth place**: Pos / Team / Pld / Pts; 2 / Melbourne Victory / 23 / **53**; 3 / Adelaide United / 23 / **45**; **4** / Central Coast Mariners (C) / **23** / **34**; 5 / Canberra United / 23 / **33**; 6 / Western United / 23 / **33**; Source: A-Leagues (C) Champions	
Round	Opponent	Score
Elimination-finals	Canberra United	2–1
Semi-finals	Melbourne City	3–2 (a.e.t.) (agg.)

=== Bracket ===
Elimination-finals
4	**Central Coast Mariners**	**2**
5	Canberra United	1
3	**Adelaide United**	**1**
6	Western United	0

Semi-finals
1	Melbourne City	2	0	**2**
4	**Central Coast Mariners** (a.e.t.)	2	1	**3**
2	**Melbourne Victory**	3	3	**6**
3	Adelaide United	1	1	**2**

Grand Final
4	**Central Coast Mariners**	**1 (5)**
2	Melbourne Victory	1 (4)

== Match ==
=== Details ===
18 May 2025
15:15 AEST (UTC+10:00)

Melbourne Victory	1–1 (a.e.t.)	Central Coast Mariners
Bunge 80'	Report	Gomez 46'
Penalties
Jancevski (penalty missed); Gielnik (penalty scored); Chidiac (penalty scored); Furphy (penalty scored); Morrison (penalty scored)	4–5	(penalty scored) Fuller; (penalty scored) Trimis; (penalty scored) Pennock; (penalty scored) Gomez; (penalty scored) Galic

AAMI Park, Melbourne
Attendance: 6,568
Referee: Isabella Cooper (South Australia)

**Melbourne Victory**	**Central Coast Mariners**

GK	50	(Australia) Courtney Newbon
RB	2	(Australia) Ellie Wilson
CB	3	(New Zealand) Claudia Bunge
CB	18	(United States) Kayla Morrison (c)
LB	66	(Australia) Alana Jancevski	(yellow card) 63'
CM	8	(Australia) Alana Murphy
CM	13	(United States) Sara D'Appolonia
CM	10	(Australia) Alex Chidiac
RW	15	(Australia) Emily Gielnik
LW	23	(Australia) Rachel Lowe		(substituted off) 66'
CF	11	(Australia) Nickoletta Flannery
Substitutes:
GK	62	(Australia) Geo Candy
MF	24	(Australia) Laura Pickett
MF	27	(Australia) Rosie Curtis
MF	41	(Australia) Jessica Young
FW	7	(Australia) Ella O'Grady
FW	9	(Australia) Holly Furphy		(substituted on) 66'
Manager:
(Wales) Jeff Hopkins

GK	1	(Australia) Sarah Langman
RB	13	(Republic of Ireland) Sarah Rowe		(substituted off) 72'
CB	18	(Australia) Taren King (c)		(substituted off) 91'
CB	4	(Australia) Jessika Nash
LB	5	(Australia) Annabel Martin
RM	21	(England) Brooke Nunn	(yellow card) 63'	(substituted off) 86'
CM	10	(Australia) Taylor Ray
CM	8	(Croatia) Bianca Galic	(yellow card) 52'
LM	6	(Australia) Isabel Gomez	(yellow card) 109'
CF	11	(Australia) Annalise Rasmussen		(substituted off) 110'
CF	7	(England) Jade Pennock
Substitutes:
GK	17	(Australia) Teresa Morrissey
DF	14	(Australia) Greta Kraszula		(substituted on) 91'
DF	25	(Australia) Blake Hughes		(substituted on) 72'
MF	16	(Australia) Tess Quilligan
FW	12	(Australia) Tiana Fuller		(substituted on) 86'
FW	22	(Australia) Peta Trimis		(substituted on) 110'
Manager:
(England) Emily Husband

Player of the Match:
Isabel Gomez (Central Coast Mariners)

Assistant referees:
Maddy Allum (New South Wales)
Paula Orlandi (South Australia)
Fourth official:
Molly Godsell (New South Wales)
Fifth official:
Danielle Anderson (Victoria)

**Match rules**

- 90 minutes
- 30 minutes of extra time if necessary.
- Penalty shoot-out if scores still level
- Six named substitutes.
- Maximum of four substitutions, with a fifth allowed in extra time.

== See also ==
- 2024–25 A-League Women
- 2024–25 Melbourne Victory FC (women) season
- 2024–25 Central Coast Mariners FC (women) season
