= 2024–25 Melbourne Victory FC (women) season =

17th season in existence of Melbourne Victory FC (women)

Melbourne Victory (A-League Women)
2024–25 season
- Owner: 70% 777 Partners; 30% Melbourne Victory Limited
- Chairman: John Dovaston
- Manager: Jeff Hopkins
- Stadium: The Home of the Matildas; AAMI Park (doubleheaders)
- A-League Women: 2nd
- A-League Women Finals: Runners-up
- Top goalscorer: League: Emily Gielnik (12); All: Emily Gielnik (13)
- Highest home attendance: 3,850 vs. Melbourne City (9 November 2024); A-League Women
- Lowest home attendance: 725 vs. Wellington Phoenix (13 December 2024); A-League Women
- Average home league attendance: 1,863
- Biggest win: 4–1 vs. Western United (H) (17 November 2024); A-League Women
- Biggest defeat: 2–3 vs. Melbourne City (H) (9 November 2024); A-League Women
Home colours	Away colours
- All statistics correct as of 14 December 2024.

The 2024–25 season was Melbourne Victory Football Club (women)'s 17th season in the A-League Women. The team finished second in the A-League Women's regular season and finished runner up in the 2025 A-League Women Grand Final.

== Players ==
=== First-team squad ===
As of 24 January 2025

Note: Flags indicate national team as defined under FIFA eligibility rules; some limited exceptions apply. Players may hold more than one non-FIFA nationality.

No.	Pos.	Nation	Player
1	GK	AUS	Lydia Williams
2	DF	ENG	Ellie Wilson
3	DF	NZL	Claudia Bunge
5	MF	AUS	Sofia Sakalis
7	FW	AUS	Ella O'Grady
8	MF	AUS	Alana Murphy
9	FW	AUS	Holly Furphy (injury replacement)
10	FW	AUS	Alex Chidiac
11	FW	AUS	Nickoletta Flannery
13	MF	USA	Sara D'Appolonia
15	FW	AUS	Emily Gielnik

No.	Pos.	Nation	Player
16	MF	AUS	Paige Zois
18	DF	USA	Kayla Morrison (captain)
19	FW	AUS	Lia Privitelli
22	MF	AUS	Ava Briedis
23	MF	AUS	Rachel Lowe
24	MF	AUS	Laura Pickett
27	MF	AUS	Rosie Curtis
50	GK	AUS	Courtney Newbon
62	GK	AUS	Geo Candy
66	FW	AUS	Alana Jancevski

== Transfers ==
=== Transfers in ===
No.	Position	Player	From	Type/fee	Contract length	Date	Ref
13	DF	Polly Doran	(England) Crystal Palace	End of loan	(1 year)	17 May 2024	
66	FW	Alana Jancevski	Unattached	Free transfer	1 year	27 August 2024	
11	FW	Nickoletta Flannery	Canberra United	Free transfer	1 year	28 August 2024	
5	MF	Sofia Sakalis	Perth Glory	Free transfer	1 year	29 August 2024	
2	DF	(England) Ellie Wilson	(England) Wolverhampton Wanderers	Free transfer	1 year	30 August 2024	
3	DF	(New Zealand) Claudia Bunge	(Denmark) HB Køge	Free transfer	2 years	30 August 2024	
9	FW	Holly Furphy	Unattached	Injury replacement		24 January 2025	

=== Transfers out ===
No.	Position	Player	Transferred to	Type/fee	Date	Ref
15	DF	Emma Checker	Retired		12 March 2024	
3	DF	(United States) Tori Hansen	(United States) Orlando Pride	End of loan	16 April 2024	
13	DF	Polly Doran	(Sweden) Linköping	Undisclosed	1 July 2024	
2	DF	Jamilla Rankin	(Germany) TSG Hoffenheim	End of contract	4 August 2024	
20	GK	Miranda Templeman	Unattached	End of contract	13 August 2024	
5	DF	Jessika Nash	Unattached	End of contract	26 August 2024	
13	FW	(Japan) Kurea Okino	Unattached	End of contract	26 August 2024	
21	DF	Elise Kellond-Knight	(Australia) Avondale FC	End of contract	24 September 2024	
6	MF	Beattie Goad	Retired		28 December 2024	

=== Contract extensions ===
No.	Player	Position	Duration	Date	Ref.
6	Beattie Goad	Central midfielder	1 year	26 August 2024	
7	Ella O'Grady	Forward	1 year	26 August 2024	
8	Alana Murphy	Midfielder	1 year	26 August 2024	
13	(United States) Sara D'Appolonia	Midfielder	1 year	26 August 2024	
15	Emily Gielnik	Forward	1 year	26 August 2024	
16	Paige Zois	Midfielder	1 year	26 August 2024	
19	Lia Privitelli	Forward	1 year	26 August 2024	
22	Ava Briedis	Midfielder	1 year	26 August 2024	
23	Rachel Lowe	Midfielder	1 year	26 August 2024	
24	Laura Pickett	Midfielder	1 year	26 August 2024	
27	Rosie Curtis	Midfielder	2 years	26 August 2024	
50	Courtney Newbon	Goalkeeper	1 year	26 August 2024	
62	Geo Candy	Goalkeeper	1 year	7 November 2024	
18	(United States) Kayla Morrison	Centre-back	2 years	27 March 2025	Contract extended from end of 2024–25 to end of 2026–27.

== Pre-season and friendlies ==
20 October 2024	Western United (Australia)	1–4	(Australia) Melbourne Victory	Ballarat, Australia
14:00 AEDT	? (?)	Report	Gielnik (?); Lowe (?); Flannery (?); Hussein (?)	Stadium: Morshead Park

25 October 2024	Melbourne Victory (Australia)	0–0	(Australia) Canberra United	Albury, Australia
18:20 AEDT		Report		Stadium: Lavington Sports Ground

== Competitions ==
=== Overall record ===
Competition	First match	Last match	Final position	Record							
Competition	First match	Last match	Final position	Pld	W	D	L	GF	GA	GD	Win %
A-League Women	2 November 2024	19 April 2025	2nd	23	16	5	2	42	21	+21	69.57
A-League Women Finals	4 May 2025	18 May 2025	Runners-up	3	2	1	0	7	3	+4	66.67
Total				26	18	6	2	49	24	+25	69.23

Last updated: 18 May 2025
Source: Competitions

=== A-League Women ===
==== League table ====
Pos	Team	Pld	W	D	L	GF	GA	GD	Pts	Qualification
1	Melbourne City	23	16	7	0	56	22	+34	55	Qualification for AFC Women's Champions League and Finals series
2	Melbourne Victory	23	16	5	2	42	21	+21	53	Qualification for Finals series
3	Adelaide United	23	14	3	6	44	30	+14	45	Qualification for Finals series
4	Central Coast Mariners (C)	23	9	7	7	31	25	+6	34	Qualification for Finals series
5	Canberra United	23	9	6	8	28	31	−3	33	Qualification for Finals series

Source: A-Leagues
Rules for classification: 1) points; 2) goal difference; 3) goals scored; 4) wins; 5) head-to-head results; 5a) head-to-head points; 5b) head-to-head goal difference; 6) Fair Play points; 7) away goal difference; 8) away goals per match; 9) home goal difference; 10) home goals per match; 11) toss of a coin in an event of a tie of two clubs.
(C) Champions

==== Matches ====
Win Draw Loss

2 November 2024 1	Adelaide United	2–3	Melbourne Victory	Adelaide
16:30 ACDT	Worts 6', 71'	Report	Gielnik 4', 45+3'; Briedis 90+2'	Stadium: ServiceFM Stadium; Attendance: 1,022; Referee: Kelly Jones

9 November 2024 2	Melbourne Victory	2–3	Melbourne City	Melbourne
14:15 AEDT	Gielnik 20' (pen.); Jancevski 42'	Report	Speckmaier 6', 85'; Bosch 64'	Stadium: AAMI Park; Attendance: 3,850; Referee: Georgia Ghirardello

17 November 2024 3	Melbourne Victory	4–1	Western United	Melbourne
16:00 AEDT	Gielnik 1', 9', 41'; O'Grady 80'	Report	Zimmerman 20'	Stadium: The Home of the Matildas; Attendance: 1,014; Referee: Rachel Mitchenson

23 November 2024 4	Central Coast Mariners	1–1	Melbourne Victory	Sydney
14:15 AEDT	Rasmussen 12'	Report	Morrison 85'	Stadium: Netstrata Jubilee Stadium (Note: Match moved from Leichhardt Oval following a pitch assessment.); Attendance: 1,238; Referee: Georgia Ghirardello

8 December 2024 5	Perth Glory	0–1	Melbourne Victory	Perth
17:00 AWST		Report	Murphy 90+2'	Stadium: Sam Kerr Football Centre; Attendance: 971; Referee: Bec Mackie

13 December 2024 6	Melbourne Victory	1–1	Wellington Phoenix	Melbourne
18:00 AEDT	Jancevski 51' (pen.)	Report	Elliott 90'	Stadium: The Home of the Matildas; Attendance: 725; Referee: Molly Godsell

21 December 2024 7	Canberra United	0–2	Melbourne Victory	Canberra
17:00 AEDT		Report	Flannery 4'; D'Appolonia 46'	Stadium: McKellar Park; Attendance: 1,212; Referee: Rebecca Durcau

28 December 2024 8	Sydney FC	0–1	Melbourne Victory	Sydney
16:50 AEDT		Report	Jancevski 14' (pen.)	Stadium: Allianz Stadium; Attendance: 5,630; Referee: Bec Mackie

5 January 2025 9	Melbourne Victory	4–4	Western Sydney Wanderers	Melbourne
17:00 AEDT	Bunge 45'; Wilson 51'; Ferris 77' (o.g.); Chidiac 87'	Report	Harding 4', 90+2'; Saveska 54'; Kapetanellis 89'	Stadium: The Home of the Matildas; Attendance: 725; Referee: Caitlin Williams

8 January 2025 10	Brisbane Roar	2–0	Melbourne Victory	Brisbane
18:00 AEST	Kuilamu 22', 37'	Report		Stadium: Perry Park; Attendance: 2,965; Referee: Bec Mackie

11 January 2025 11	Newcastle Jets	0–2	Melbourne Victory	Newcastle
17:00 AEDT		Report	Gielnik 18'; Lowe 43'	Stadium: No.2 Sportsground; Attendance: 1,753; Referee: Mikayla Ryan

18 January 2025 12	Melbourne Victory	1–0	Perth Glory	Melbourne
18:00 AEDT	Morrison 33'	Report		Stadium: The Home of the Matildas; Attendance: 1,014; Referee: Rachael Mitchenson

24 January 2025 13	Melbourne Victory	2–0	Sydney FC	Melbourne
16:50 AEDT	Jancevski 4'; Furphy 77'	Report		Stadium: AAMI Park; Attendance: 2,494; Referee: Georgia Ghirardello

1 February 2025 14	Melbourne City	1–1	Melbourne Victory	Melbourne
17:00 AEDT	Speckmaier 89'	Report	Lowe 5'	Stadium: ctrl:cyber Pitch; Attendance: 1,565; Referee: Caitlin Williams

8 February 2025 15	Wellington Phoenix	1–1	Melbourne Victory	Wellington
16:00 NZDT	McCutcheon 2'	Report	Flannery 61'	Stadium: Porirua Park; Attendance: 1,015; Referee: Kelly Jones

16 February 2025 16	Melbourne Victory	2–0	Central Coast Mariners	Melbourne
17:00 AEDT	Gielnik 10', 46'	Report		Stadium: The Home of the Matildas; Attendance: 887; Referee: Caitlin Williams

1 March 2025 17	Western United	1–2	Melbourne Victory	Melbourne
18:00 AEDT	Gielnik 45' (o.g.)	Report	Furphy 10'; Morrison 47'	Stadium: Ironbark Fields; Attendance: 897; Referee: Izzy Cooper

9 March 2025 18	Melbourne Victory	2–0	Canberra United	Melbourne
17:00 AEDT	Furphy 70'; Gielnik 83'	Report		Stadium: The Home of the Matildas; Attendance: 839; Referee: Bec Mackie

21 March 2025 20	Melbourne Victory	4–3	Newcastle Jets	Melbourne
19:00 AEDT	Gielnik 1', 11'; Jancevski 22'; Morrison 90+6'	Report	L. Allan 43'; Hoban 45'; Gallagher 90+2'	Stadium: The Home of the Matildas; Attendance: 632; Referee: Molly Godsell

29 March 2025 21	Melbourne Victory	2–1	Adelaide United	Melbourne
16:50 AEDT	Flannery 69', 90+1'	Report	Holmes 86' (pen.)	Stadium: AAMI Park; Attendance: 1,716; Referee: Izzy Cooper

6 April 2025 19	Western Sydney Wanderers	0–1	Melbourne Victory	Sydney
17:00 AEDT		Report	Matos 18' (o.g.)	Stadium: Wanderers Football Park; Attendance: 568; Referee: Molly Godsell
Note: Was originally scheduled to take place on 15 March at CommBank Stadium, but was postponed due to heat policy and rescheduled for 6 April at Wanderers Football Park.

11 April 2025 22	Central Coast Mariners	0–1	Melbourne Victory	Gosford
19:00 AEST		Report	Bunge 58'	Stadium: Industree Group Stadium; Attendance: 826; Referee: Page Malau-Aduli

19 April 2025 23	Melbourne Victory	2–0	Brisbane Roar	Melbourne
14:15 AEST	Flannery 43'; Chidiac 54'	Report		Stadium: AAMI Park; Attendance: 1,740; Referee: Izzy Cooper

==== Finals series ====
4 May 2025 Semi-final 1st leg	Adelaide United	1–3	Melbourne Victory	Adelaide
16:00	Healy 40'	Report	Gielnik 38'; Bunge 77', 88'	Stadium: Coopers Stadium; Attendance: 4,372; Referee: Caitlin Williams

10 May 2025 Semi-final second leg	Melbourne Victory	3–1 (6–2 agg.)	Adelaide United	Melbourne
17:15 AEST	Lowe 11', 78'; D'Appolonia 61'	Report	Hodgson 90+6'	Stadium: The Home of the Matildas; Attendance: 1,314; Referee: Izzy Cooper

18 May 2025 Grand Final	Melbourne Victory	1–1 (a.e.t.) (4–5 p)	Central Coast Mariners	Melbourne
15:15 AEST	Bunge 80'	Report	Gomez 46'	Stadium: AAMI Park; Attendance: 6,568; Referee: Izzy Cooper
	Penalties
	Jancevski (penalty missed); Gielnik (penalty scored); Chidiac (penalty scored); Furphy (penalty scored); Morrison (penalty scored)		(penalty scored) Fuller; (penalty scored) Trimis; (penalty scored) Pennock; (penalty scored) Gomez; (penalty scored) Galic

== Statistics ==
=== Appearances and goals ===
Includes all competitions. Players with no appearances not included in the list.

As of match played 18 May 2025

No.	Pos	Nat	Player	Total		A-League Women		A-League Women Finals	
No.	Pos	Nat	Player	Apps	Goals	Apps	Goals	Apps	Goals
2	DF	(England) ENG	Ellie Wilson	16	1	11+2	1	3	0
3	DF	(New Zealand) NZL	Claudia Bunge	25	5	22	2	3	3
5	MF	(Australia) AUS	Sofia Sakalis	7	0	1+6	0	0	0
6	MF	(Australia) AUS	Beattie Goad	7	0	7	0	0	0
7	FW	(Australia) AUS	Ella O'Grady	18	1	1+15	1	0+2	0
8	MF	(Australia) AUS	Alana Murphy	24	1	20+1	1	3	0
9	FW	(Australia) AUS	Holly Furphy	14	3	4+7	3	0+3	0
10	MF	(Australia) AUS	Alex Chidiac	25	2	22	2	3	0
11	MF	(Australia) AUS	Nickoletta Flannery	26	5	22+1	5	3	0
13	MF	(United States) USA	Sara D'Appolonia	26	2	19+4	1	3	1
15	FW	(Australia) AUS	Emily Gielnik	22	13	18+1	12	3	1
16	MF	(Australia) AUS	Paige Zois	1	0	0+1	0	0	0
18	DF	(Australia) AUS	Kayla Morrison	26	4	23	4	3	0
22	MF	(Australia) AUS	Ava Briedis	6	1	0+6	1	0	0
23	MF	(Australia) AUS	Rachel Lowe	26	4	23	2	3	2
24	MF	(Australia) AUS	Laura Pickett	18	0	11+6	0	0+1	0
27	MF	(Australia) AUS	Rosie Curtis	12	0	5+5	0	0+2	0
41	MF	(Australia) AUS	Jessica Young	3	0	0+3	0	0	0
50	GK	(Australia) AUS	Courtney Newbon	26	0	23	0	3	0
66	FW	(Australia) AUS	Alana Jancevski	25	5	21+1	5	3	0

=== Disciplinary record ===
Includes all competitions. The list is sorted by squad number when total cards are equal. Players with no cards not included in the list.

As of match played 13 December 2024

Rank	No.	Pos.	Nat.	Name	A-League Women			Total							
Rank	No.	Pos.	Nat.	Name	Yellow card	(yellow card) (yellow-red card)	Red card	Yellow card	(yellow card) (yellow-red card)	Red card					
Rank	No.	Pos.	Nat.	Name	1	8	MF	(Australia)	Alana Murphy	2	0	0	2	0	0
13	MF	(United States)	Sara D'Appolonia	2	1	0	0	2	0	0					
3	2	DF	(England)	Ellie Wilson	1	0	0	1	0	0					
3	3	DF	(New Zealand)	Claudia Bunge	1	0	0	1	0	0					
3	6	MF	(Australia)	Beattie Goad	1	0	0	1	0	0					
3	7	FW	(Australia)	Ella O'Grady	1	0	0	1	0	0					
3	10	MF	(Australia)	Alex Chidiac	1	0	0	1	0	0					
3	18	DF	(Australia)	Kayla Morrison	1	0	0	1	0	0					
3	23	MF	(Australia)	Rachel Lowe	1	0	0	1	0	0					
3	66	FW	(Australia)	Alana Jancevski	1	0	0	1	0	0					
Total					12	0	0	12	0	0					

=== Clean sheets ===
Includes all competitions. The list is sorted by squad number when total clean sheets are equal. Numbers in parentheses represent games where both goalkeepers participated and both kept a clean sheet; the number in parentheses is awarded to the goalkeeper who was substituted on, whilst a full clean sheet is awarded to the goalkeeper who was on the field at the start of play. Goalkeepers with no clean sheets not included in the list.

As of match played 18 May 2025

Rank	No.	Nat.	Goalkeeper	A-League Women	A-League Women Finals	Total
1	50	(Australia)	Courtney Newbon	11	0	11

== See also ==
- 2024–25 Melbourne Victory FC season
