= 2023–24 Melbourne Victory FC (women) season =

16th season in existence of Melbourne Victory FC (women)

Melbourne Victory (A-League Women)
2023–24 season
- Owner: 70% 777 Partners; 30% Melbourne Victory Limited
- Chairman: John Dovaston
- Manager: Jeff Hopkins
- Stadium: The Home of the Matildas; AAMI Park
- A-League Women: 4th
- A-League Women Finals: Elimination-finals
- Top goalscorer: League: Rachel Lowe (12); All: Rachel Lowe (12)
- Highest home attendance: 4,522 vs. Sydney FC (26 January 2024); A-League Women
- Lowest home attendance: 818 vs. Western Sydney Wanderers (16 February 2024); A-League Women
- Average home league attendance: 2,193
- Biggest win: 4–0 vs. Newcastle Jets (H) (12 November 2023); A-League Women; 4–0 vs. Western Sydney Wanderers (H) (16 February 2024); A-League Women; 4–0 vs. Sydney FC (A) (31 March 2024); A-League Women
- Biggest defeat: 1–4 vs. Western United (H) (6 January 2024); A-League Women
Home colours	Away colours

The 2023–24 season was the 16th in the history of Melbourne Victory Football Club (A-League Women).

== Players ==
=== First-team squad ===
As of 12 January 2024

Note: Flags indicate national team as defined under FIFA eligibility rules; some limited exceptions apply. Players may hold more than one non-FIFA nationality.

No.	Pos.	Nation	Player
1	GK	AUS	Lydia Williams
2	DF	AUS	Jamilla Rankin
3	DF	USA	Tori Hansen (on loan from Orlando Pride)
4	MF	USA	Sara D'Appolonia
5	DF	AUS	Jessika Nash
6	MF	AUS	Beattie Goad
7	FW	AUS	Ella O'Grady
8	MF	AUS	Alana Murphy
9	FW	AUS	Emily Gielnik
10	FW	AUS	Alex Chidiac
11	FW	USA	McKenzie Weinert
13	FW	JPN	Kurea Okino

No.	Pos.	Nation	Player
15	DF	AUS	Emma Checker
16	MF	AUS	Paige Zois
18	DF	USA	Kayla Morrison (captain)
19	FW	AUS	Lia Privitelli
20	GK	AUS	Miranda Templeman
21	DF	AUS	Elise Kellond-Knight
22	MF	AUS	Ava Briedis (scholarship)
23	MF	AUS	Rachel Lowe
24	MF	AUS	Laura Pickett
27	MF	AUS	Rosie Curtis (scholarship)
50	GK	AUS	Courtney Newbon (injury replacement)
66	GK	AUS	Geo Candy (injury replacement)

== Transfers ==
=== Transfers in ===
No.	Position	Player	Transferred from	Type/fee	Contract length	Date	Ref.
23	MF	Rachel Lowe	Sydney FC	Free transfer	1 year	21 August 2023	
15	DF	Emma Checker	Melbourne City	Free transfer	1 year	22 August 2023	
2	DF	Jamilla Rankin	Brisbane Roar	Free transfer	1 year	23 August 2023	
13	FW	(Japan) Kurea Okino	(Australia) Boroondara Eagles	Free transfer	1 year	24 August 2023	
7	FW	Ella O'Grady	(Australia) QAS	Free transfer	1 year	25 August 2023	
3	DF	(United States) Tori Hansen	(United States) Orlando Pride	Loan	1 year	13 September 2023	
11	FW	(United States) McKenzie Weinert	(United States) OL Reign	Free transfer	1 year	15 September 2023	
1	GK	Lydia Williams	(England) Brighton & Hove Albion	Undisclosed	2 years	16 September 2023	
9	FW	Emily Gielnik	Unattached	Free transfer	1 year	22 September 2023	
24	MF	Laura Pickett	Unattached	Free transfer	1 year	13 October 2023	
4	MF	(United States) Sara D'Appolonia	(Australia) Peninsula Power	Free transfer	1 year	16 October 2023	
10	MF	Alex Chidiac	Unattached	Free transfer	2.5 years	30 December 2023	
50	GK	Courtney Newbon	Unattached	Injury replacement		6 January 2024	
66	GK	(New Zealand) Geo Candy	Unattached	Injury replacement		12 January 2024	

=== Transfers out ===
No.	Position	Player	Transferred to	Type/fee	Date	Ref.
1	GK	Casey Dumont	(Australia) Hawthorn (AFLW)		28 April 2023	
23	DF	Emily Kos	Unattached	End of contract	16 May 2023	
17	FW	Maja Markovski	Unattached	End of contract	16 May 2023	
7	DF	Gema Simon	Unattached	End of contract	16 May 2023	
9	FW	(United States) Catherine Zimmerman	Western United	Free transfer	26 July 2023	
14	FW	Melina Ayres	Newcastle Jets	Free transfer	24 August 2023	
3	DF	(New Zealand) Claudia Bunge	(Denmark) HB Køge	Undisclosed	28 August 2023	
11	DF	Natalie Tathem	Unattached	End of contract	8 September 2023	
24	DF	Anna Liacopoulos	Unattached	End of contract	8 September 2023	
15	MF	Amy Jackson	Unattached	End of contract	1 October 2023	
2	FW	Tiffany Eliadis	(Portugal) Atlético Ouriense	End of contract	9 October 2023	
11	FW	(United States) McKenzie Weinert	(United States) Seattle Reign	Undisclosed	22 February 2024	

=== Contract extensions ===
No.	Position	Player	Duration	Date	Ref.
18	Kayla Morrison	Defender	1 year	21 August 2023	
19	Lia Privitelli	Forward	1 year	22 August 2023	
8	Alana Murphy	Midfielder	1 year	23 August 2023	
22	Ava Briedis	Midfielder	1 year	24 August 2023	
16	Paige Zois	Midfielder	1 year	24 August 2023	
27	Rosie Curtis	Midfielder	1 year	25 August 2023	
21	Elise Kellond-Knight	Defender	1 year	25 August 2023	

== Pre-season and friendlies ==
1 October 2023	Melbourne Victory (Australia)	0–3	(Australia) Melbourne City	Melbourne
11:30 AEDT		Report	Hansen 35' (o.g.); Wilkinson 54'; Pollicina 79'	Stadium: The Home of the Matildas

7 October 2023	Melbourne Victory (Australia)	2–0	(Australia) Western United	Melbourne
09:40 AEDT	Lowe 64'; Okino 90'	Report		Stadium: The Home of the Matildas; Attendance: 0 (behind closed doors)

== Competitions ==
=== Overall record ===
Competition	First match	Last match	Starting round	Final position	Record							
Competition	First match	Last match	Starting round	Final position	Pld	W	D	L	GF	GA	GD	Win %
A-League Women	15 October 2023	31 March 2024	Matchday 1	4th	21	9	6	6	40	29	+11	42.86
A-League Women Finals	14 April 2024		Elimination-finals	Elimination-finals	1	0	1	0	0	0	+0	0.00
Total					22	9	7	6	40	29	+11	40.91

Source: Soccerway

=== A-League Women ===
==== League table ====
Pos	Team	Pld	W	D	L	GF	GA	GD	Pts	Qualification
2	Sydney FC (C)	22	11	6	5	31	20	+11	39	Qualification to Finals series
3	Western United	22	11	3	8	37	34	+3	36	Qualification to Finals series
4	Melbourne Victory	22	10	6	6	44	29	+15	36	Qualification to Finals series
5	Central Coast Mariners	22	10	5	7	31	24	+7	35	Qualification to Finals series
6	Newcastle Jets	22	10	3	9	43	36	+7	33	Qualification to Finals series

Source: A-Leagues
Rules for classification: 1) points; 2) wins; 3) goal difference; 4) goals scored; 5) head-to-head results; 6) Fair Play points; 7) away head-to-head results; 8) home head-to-head results; 9) toss of a coin
(C) Champions

==== Results summary ====
Overall								Home						Away					
Pld	W	D	L	GF	GA	GD	Pts	W	D	L	GF	GA	GD	W	D	L	GF	GA	GD
21	10	5	6	43	28	+15	35	6	2	2	22	11	+11	4	3	4	21	17	+4

Source: KEEPUP

==== Results by round ====
Round	1	2	3	4	5	6	7	8	9	10	11	12	13	14	15	16	17	18	19	20	21	22
Ground	H	A	H	H	A	H	A	H	A	A	H	N	A	H	A	A	H	H	A	H	A	A
Result	L	L	W	W	D	W	D	W	L	L	L	D	W	D	W	D	W	W	W	D	L	W
Position	8	11	8	5	4	4	4	3	4	4	7	8	6	8	5	5	4	4	4	5	7	4
Points	0	0	3	6	7	10	11	14	14	14	14	15	18	19	22	23	26	29	32	33	33	36

Source: KEEPUP
A = Away; H = Home; N = Neutral; W = Win; D = Draw; L = Loss

==== Matches ====
Win Draw Loss

15 October 2023 1	Melbourne Victory	1–2	Brisbane Roar	Melbourne
16:00 AEDT	O'Grady 90+4'	Report	Kuilamu 49'; McCormick 70'	Stadium: The Home of the Matildas; Attendance: 2,588; Referee: Anna-Marie Keighley

22 October 2023 2	Western United	2–1	Melbourne Victory	Melbourne
16:00 AEDT	M. Taranto 66'; Hieda 90'	Report	Checker 15'	Stadium: City Vista Recreation Reserve; Attendance: 2,200; Referee: Georgia Ghirardello

4 November 2023 3	Melbourne Victory	2–0	Adelaide United	Melbourne
17:00 AEDT	Weinert 31'; Morrison 37'	Report		Stadium: AAMI Park; Attendance: 4,102; Referee: Isabella Blaess

12 November 2023 4	Melbourne Victory	4–0	Newcastle Jets	Melbourne
15:00 AEDT	Lowe 2', 65'; O'Grady 66'; Burrows 88' (o.g.)	Report		Stadium: The Home of the Matildas; Attendance: 1,796; Referee: Anna-Marie Keighley

18 November 2023 5	Perth Glory	2–2	Melbourne Victory	Perth
19:00 AWST	Lowry 24', 90+6'	Report	Lowe 79', 84'	Stadium: Macedonia Park; Attendance: 1,533; Referee: Caitlin Williams

26 November 2023 6	Melbourne Victory	2–1	Central Coast Mariners	Melbourne
14:00 AEDT	Okino 60'; Weinert 90+1'	Report	Bryson 71'	Stadium: The Home of the Matildas; Attendance: 1,056; Referee: Asaka Koizumi

10 December 2023 7	Wellington Phoenix	2–2	Melbourne Victory	Porirua
16:00 NZDT	Taylor 17'; Main 24'	Report	Morrison 15'; Okino 37'	Stadium: Jerry Collins Stadium; Attendance: 672; Referee: Anna-Marie Keighley

16 December 2023 8	Melbourne Victory	2–0	Canberra United	Melbourne
17:00 AEDT	Weinert 28'; Okino 57'	Report		Stadium: AAMI Park; Attendance: 2,264; Referee: Georgia Ghirardello

23 December 2023 9	Melbourne City	1–0	Melbourne Victory	Melbourne
17:00 AEDT	Ekic 10'	Report		Stadium: AAMI Park; Attendance: 6,286; Referee: Kate Jacewicz

30 December 2023 10	Western Sydney Wanderers	2–0	Melbourne Victory	Sydney
18:00 AEDT	Harrison 38'; Apostolakis 51'	Report		Stadium: Wanderers Football Park; Attendance: 696; Referee: Isabella Libri

6 January 2024 11	Melbourne Victory	1–4	Western United	Melbourne
18:00 AEDT	Lowe 78'	Report	Hieda 32'; A. Taranto 34'; Logarzo 60', 69'	Stadium: The Home of the Matildas; Attendance: 1,686; Referee: Beth Rattray

12 January 2024 12	Melbourne Victory	1–1	Perth Glory	Sydney
17:00 AEDT	Lowe 28'	Report	Rankin 60' (o.g.)	Stadium: Leichhardt Oval; Attendance: 1,130; Referee: Caitlin Williams
Note: Originally scheduled for 14 January 2024, was moved due to Unite Round.

20 January 2024 13	Canberra United	2–3	Melbourne Victory	Canberra
17:00 AEDT	Heyman 5', 70'	Report	Lowe 18'; Chidiac 46'; Gielnik 90+3'	Stadium: McKellar Park; Attendance: 2,148; Referee: Isabella Mossin

26 January 2024 14	Melbourne Victory	1–1	Sydney FC	Melbourne
17:00 AEDT	Lowe 21' (pen.)	Report	Caspers 7'	Stadium: AAMI Park; Attendance: 4,522; Referee: Isabella Blaess

3 February 2024 15	Brisbane Roar	1–2	Melbourne Victory	Brisbane
17:00 AEST	Yallop 36'	Report	Checker 4'; Lowe 77' (pen.)	Stadium: Perry Park; Attendance: 2,175; Referee: Rebecca Durcau

10 February 2024 16	Central Coast Mariners	1–1	Melbourne Victory	Gosford
17:00 AEDT	Trimis 6'	Report	Gielnik 66'	Stadium: Industree Group Stadium; Attendance: 4,226; Referee: Caitlin Williams

16 February 2024 17	Melbourne Victory	4–0	Western Sydney Wanderers	Melbourne
19:00 AEDT	Weinert 20', 63'; Gielnik 60', 71'	Report		Stadium: The Home of the Matildas; Attendance: 818; Referee: Molly Godsell

3 March 2024 18	Melbourne Victory	5–3	Wellington Phoenix	Melbourne
14:00 AEDT	Goad 10', 35'; Hansen 17'; Foster 45' (o.g.); Lowe 64'	Report	Rankin 57' (o.g.); Robertson 90'; Speckmaier 90+1'	Stadium: The Home of the Matildas; Attendance: 1,087; Referee: Rebecca Durcau

10 March 2024 19	Adelaide United	1–4	Melbourne Victory	Adelaide
16:30 ACDT	Hodgson 72'	Report	Gielnik 9', 32', 67'; Morrison 82'	Stadium: Coopers Stadium; Attendance: 923; Referee: Isabella Libri
Note: Match originally scheduled for 9 March 2024, but postponed due to extreme heat forecast. It was rescheduled to 10 March 2024.

17 March 2024 20	Melbourne Victory	0–0	Melbourne City	Melbourne
14:00 AEDT		Report		Stadium: The Home of the Matildas; Attendance: 2,012; Referee: Casey Reibelt

23 March 2024 21	Newcastle Jets	3–2	Melbourne Victory	Newcastle
16:00 AEDT	Allan 40'; Ayres 80', 87'	Report	Lowe 14'; Hansen 53'	Stadium: Newcastle Number 2 Sports Ground; Attendance: 2,892; Referee: Rebecca Durcau

31 March 2024 22	Sydney FC	0–4	Melbourne Victory	Sydney
16:00 AEDT		Report	Murphy 17'; Lowe 38' (pen.); Gielnik 64'; Chidiac 90+6'	Stadium: Leichhardt Oval; Attendance: 4,576; Referee: Casey Reibelt

==== Finals series ====
14 April 2024 Elimination-finals	Melbourne Victory	0–0 (a.e.t.) (2–4 p)	Central Coast Mariners	Melbourne
16:00 AEST		Report		Stadium: The Home of the Matildas; Attendance: 1,722; Referee: Rebecca Durcau
	Penalties
	Lowe (penalty scored); Chidiac (penalty scored); Murphy (penalty missed); Zois (penalty missed)		(penalty scored) Dumont; (penalty scored) Bryson; (penalty scored) Wurigumula; (penalty scored) Galic

== Statistics ==
=== Appearances and goals ===
Includes all competitions. Players with no appearances not included in the list.

No.	Pos.	Nat.	Name	A-League Women				Total	
No.	Pos.	Nat.	Name	Regular season		Finals series		Total	
No.	Pos.	Nat.	Name	Apps	Goals	Apps	Goals	Apps	Goals
1	GK	(Australia)	Lydia Williams	11	0	0	0	11	0
2	DF	(Australia)	Jamilla Rankin	22	0	1	0	23	0
3	DF	(United States)	Tori Hansen	17+2	2	1	0	20	2
4	MF	(United States)	Sara D'Appolonia	13+8	0	0	0	21	0
5	DF	(Australia)	Jessika Nash	12+2	0	1	0	15	0
6	MF	(Australia)	Beattie Goad	12	2	1	0	13	2
7	FW	(Australia)	Ella O'Grady	0+7	2	0	0	7	2
8	MF	(Australia)	Alana Murphy	14+5	0	1	0	20	0
9	FW	(Australia)	Emily Gielnik	8+5	8	0	0	13	8
10	MF	(Australia)	Alex Chidiac	12+1	2	1	0	14	2
11	FW	(United States)	McKenzie Weinert	17	5	0	0	17	5
13	FW	(Japan)	Kurea Okino	10+6	3	0+1	0	17	3
15	DF	(Australia)	Emma Checker	15+2	2	0	0	17	2
16	MF	(Australia)	Paige Zois	7+7	0	0+1	0	15	0
18	DF	(United States)	Kayla Morrison	22	3	1	0	23	3
19	FW	(Australia)	Lia Privitelli	3+10	0	1	0	14	0
20	GK	(Australia)	Miranda Templeman	0+1	0	0	0	1	0
21	DF	(Australia)	Elise Kellond-Knight	14+2	0	1	0	17	0
22	MF	(Australia)	Ava Briedis	0+7	0	0	0	7	0
23	MF	(Australia)	Rachel Lowe	22	12	1	0	23	12
27	MF	(Australia)	Rosie Curtis	0+6	0	0	0	6	0
50	GK	(Australia)	Courtney Newbon	11+1	0	1	0	13	0

=== Disciplinary record ===
Includes all competitions. The list is sorted by squad number when total cards are equal. Players with no cards not included in the list.

Rank	No.	Pos.	Nat.	Name	A-League Women						Total			
Rank	No.	Pos.	Nat.	Name	Regular season			Finals series			Total			
Rank	No.	Pos.	Nat.	Name	Yellow card	(yellow card) (yellow-red card)	Red card	Yellow card	(yellow card) (yellow-red card)	Red card	Yellow card	(yellow card) (yellow-red card)	Red card	
1	19	FW	(Australia)	Lia Privitelli	3	0	0	1	0	0	4	0	0	
1	23	MF	(Australia)	Rachel Lowe	4	0	0	0	0	0	4	0	0	
3	4	MF	(United States)	Sarah D'Appolonia	3	0	0	0	0	0	3	0	0	
3	6	MF	(Australia)	Beattie Goad	3	0	0	0	0	0	3	0	0	
3	11	FW	(United States)	McKenzie Weinert	3	0	0	0	0	0	3	0	0	
6	2	DF	(Australia)	Jamilla Rankin	2	0	0	0	0	0	2	0	0	
6	9	FW	(Australia)	Emily Gielnik	2	0	0	0	0	0	2	0	0	
6	15	DF	(Australia)	Emma Checker	2	0	0	0	0	0	2	0	0	
6	18	DF	(United States)	Kayla Morrison	2	0	0	0	0	0	2	0	0	
6	21	DF	(Australia)	Elise Kellond-Knight	2	0	0	0	0	0	2	0	0	
12	3	DF	(United States)	Tori Hansen	1	0	0	0	0	0	1	0	0	
12	10	MF	(Australia)	Alex Chidiac	1	0	0	0	0	0	1	0	0	
12	13	FW	(Japan)	Kurea Okino	1	0	0	0	0	0	1	0	0	
12	Total					28	0	0	1	0	0	29	0	0

=== Clean sheets ===
Includes all competitions. The list is sorted by squad number when total clean sheets are equal. Numbers in parentheses represent games where both goalkeepers participated and both kept a clean sheet; the number in parentheses is awarded to the goalkeeper who was substituted on, whilst a full clean sheet is awarded to the goalkeeper who was on the field at the start of play. Goalkeepers with no clean sheets not included in the list.

Rank	No.	Nat.	Goalkeeper	A-League Women		Total
Rank	No.	Nat.	Goalkeeper	Regular season	Finals series	Total
1	1	(Australia)	Lydia Williams	3	0	3
2	50	(Australia)	Courtney Newbon	2	1	3
Total				5	1	6

== See also ==
- 2023–24 Melbourne Victory FC season
