= 2019–20 Western Sydney Wanderers FC (women) season =

8th season in existence of Western Sydney Wandderers (women)

Western Sydney Wanderers (women)
2019–20 season
- Owner: Paul Lederer, Jefferson Cheng, Glenn Duncan, David Slade
- Chairman: Paul Lederer
- Head Coach: Dean Heffernan
- Stadium: Marconi Stadium; CommBank Stadium (doubleheaders)
- W-League: 4th
- W-League Finals: Semi-finals
- Top goalscorer: League: Kristen Hamilton (7); All: Kristen Hamilton (7)
- Highest home attendance: 3,024 vs. Perth Glory (19 January 2020); W-League
- Lowest home attendance: 787 vs. Adelaide United (14 November 2019); W-League
- Average home league attendance: 1,840
- Biggest win: 5–0 vs. Sydney FC (H) (20 December 2019); W-League
- Biggest defeat: 0–4 vs. Brisbane Roar (H) (12 January 2020); W-League; 0–4 vs. Melbourne City (H) (20 February 2020); W-League; 1–5 vs. Melbourne City (A) (15 March 2020); W-League Finals
Home colours	Away colours

The 2019–20 season was Western Sydney Wanderers Football Club (women)'s eighth season in the W-League. Western Sydney Wanderers finished 4th in their W-League season, and finished in the semi-finals of the W-League Finals.

== Players ==
Note: Flags indicate national team as defined under FIFA eligibility rules; some limited exceptions apply. Players may hold more than one non-FIFA nationality.

No.	Pos.	Nation	Player
1	GK	USA	Abby Smith
2	FW	AUS	Alix Roberts
3	DF	USA	Sam Staab
4	DF	AUS	Caitlin Cooper
5	DF	AUS	Courtney Nevin
7	MF	AUS	Amy Harrison
8	FW	AUS	Erica Halloway
10	MF	AUS	Kyra Cooney-Cross
11	FW	AUS	Cortnee Vine
14	MF	AUS	Chloe Middleton

No.	Pos.	Nation	Player
15	DF	AUS	Alexandra Huynh
16	MF	AUS	Liana Danaskos
17	DF	AUS	Tiana Jaber
19	FW	AUS	Susan Phonsongkham
21	MF	AUS	Ella Mastrantonio
23	FW	USA	Kristen Hamilton (on loan from North Carolina Courage)
25	GK	AUS	Sophie Magus
26	MF	AUS	Rosie Galea
27	DF	AUS	Danika Matos
30	GK	AUS	Courtney Newbon

== Transfers and contracts ==
=== Transfers in ===
No.	Position	Player	Transferred from	Type/fee	Date	Ref.
2	FW	Alix Roberts	(Denmark) Undisclosed	Free transfer	22 October 2019	
15	DF	Alexandra Huynh	(United States) Colorado Buffaloes	Free transfer	22 October 2019	
3	DF	(United States) Sam Staab	(United States) Washington Spirit	Free transfer	23 October 2019	
7	MF	Amy Harrison	(United States) Washington Spirit	Free transfer	23 October 2019	
6	MF	(Republic of Ireland) Denise O'Sullivan	(United States) North Carolina Courage	Loan	29 October 2019	
9	FW	(United States) Lynn Williams	(United States) North Carolina Courage	Loan	29 October 2019	
23	FW	(United States) Kristen Hamilton	(United States) North Carolina Courage	Loan	29 October 2019	
10	MF	Kyra Cooney-Cross	Melbourne Victory	Free transfer	6 November 2019	
21	MF	Ella Mastrantonio	Melbourne Victory	Free transfer	8 November 2019	
11	FW	Cortnee Vine	Newcastle Jets	Free transfer	11 November 2019	
1	GK	(United States) Abby Smith	(United States) Utah Royals	Free transfer	12 November 2019	
20	MF	Vesna Milivojević	(Australia) Bankstown City	Free transfer	12 November 2019	
17	DF	Tiana Jaber	(Australia) NWS Koalas	Free transfer	13 November 2019	
14	MF	Chloe Middleton	(Australia) Illawarra Stingrays	Free transfer	14 February 2020	
25	GK	Sophie Magus	(Australia) Sydney University	Free transfer	14 February 2020	
26	MF	Rosie Galea	(Australia) Macarthur Rams	Free transfer	14 February 2020	
27	DF	Danika Matos	(Australia) Illawarra Stingrays	Free transfer	14 February 2020	

=== Transfers out ===
No.	Position	Player	Transferred to	Type/fee	Date	Ref.
4	DF	(Netherlands) Maruschka Waldus	(Norway) Vålerenga	Free transfer	17 January 2019	
6	DF	Servet Uzunlar	(Australia) Northern Tigers	Free transfer	15 March 2019	
11	FW	(Ghana) Elizabeth Addo	(China) Jiangsu Suning	Free transfer	3 April 2019	
5	MF	Rachel Lowe	(United States) UCLA Bruins	Free transfer	21 June 2019	
9	FW	Remy Siemsen	Sydney FC	Free transfer	24 September 2019	
21	MF	Mackenzie Hawkesby	Sydney FC	Free transfer	24 September 2019	
—	DF	Ellie Brush	Sydney FC	Free transfer	24 September 2019	
19	FW	Leena Khamis	Canberra United	Free transfer	31 October 2019	
30	GK	Nicole Simonsen	Newcastle Jets	Free transfer	31 October 2019	
7	MF	(United States) Lo'eau LaBonta	(United States) Utah Royals	Loan return	4 November 2019	
17	DF	(United States) Sydney Miramontez	(United States) Utah Royals	Loan return	4 November 2019	
10	MF	Kylie Ledbrook	Unattached	Free transfer	12 November 2019	
13	DF	Georgia Yeoman-Dale	Unattached	Free transfer	12 November 2019	
15	DF	Talitha Kramer	Unattached	Free transfer	12 November 2019	
20	MF	Caitlin Jarvie	Unattached	Free transfer	12 November 2019	
6	MF	(Republic of Ireland) Denise O'Sullivan	(United States) North Carolina Courage	Loan return	21 January 2020	
20	MF	Vesna Milivojević	(Serbia) Spartak Subotica	Free transfer	4 February 2020	
9	FW	(United States) Lynn Williams	(United States) North Carolina Courage	Loan return	16 February 2020	

=== Contract extensions ===
No.	Position	Player	Duration	Date	Ref.
1	GK	Jada Whyman	1 year	26 September 2019	
5	DF	Courtney Nevin	1 year	26 September 2019	
19	FW	Susan Phongsongkham	1 year	17 October 2019	
16	MF	Liana Danaskos	1 year	4 November 2019	
8	FW	Erica Halloway	1 year	5 November 2019	
4	DF	Caitlin Cooper	1 year	13 November 2019	
30	GK	Courtney Newbon	1 year	13 November 2019	

== Competitions ==
=== Overall record ===
Competition	First match	Last match	Starting round	Final position	Record							
Competition	First match	Last match	Starting round	Final position	Pld	W	D	L	GF	GA	GD	Win %
W-League	14 November 2019	29 February 2020	Matchday 1	4th	12	7	1	4	24	20	+4	58.33
W-League Finals	15 March 2020		Semi-finals	Semi-finals	1	0	0	1	1	5	−4	0.00
Total					13	7	1	5	25	25	+0	53.85

Source: Competitions

=== W-League ===
==== League table ====
Pos	Team	Pld	W	D	L	GF	GA	GD	Pts	Qualification
1	Melbourne City (C)	12	11	1	0	27	4	+23	34	Qualification to Finals series
2	Melbourne Victory	12	7	2	3	24	14	+10	23	Qualification to Finals series
3	Sydney FC	12	7	1	4	21	13	+8	22	Qualification to Finals series
4	Western Sydney Wanderers	12	7	1	4	24	20	+4	22	Qualification to Finals series
5	Brisbane Roar	12	5	2	5	22	19	+3	17	
6	Canberra United	12	4	1	7	13	29	−16	13	
7	Perth Glory	12	3	2	7	19	24	−5	11	
8	Adelaide United	12	2	1	9	12	24	−12	7	
9	Newcastle Jets	12	2	1	9	12	27	−15	7	

Source: A-Leagues
Rules for classification: 1) points; 2) goal difference; 3) number of goals scored.
(C) Champions

==== Results summary ====
Overall								Home						Away					
Pld	W	D	L	GF	GA	GD	Pts	W	D	L	GF	GA	GD	W	D	L	GF	GA	GD
12	7	1	4	24	20	+4	22	4	0	2	11	10	+1	3	1	2	13	10	+3

Source: worldfootball.net

==== Results by round ====
Round	1	2	3	4	5	6	7	8	9	10	11	12	13	14
Ground	H	H	A	A	B	H	A	B	H	H	A	A	H	A
Result	W	W	W	D	X	W	W	X	L	W	L	L	L	W
Position	3	2	2	1	3	2	1	3	3	2	2	3	4	4
Points	3	6	9	10	10	13	16	16	16	19	19	19	19	22

Source: worldfootball.net
A = Away; H = Home; B = Bye; W = Win; D = Draw; L = Loss; X = Bye

==== Matches ====
The league fixtures were announced on 18 October 2019.

Win Draw Loss

14 November 2019 1	Western Sydney Wanderers	2–1	Adelaide United	Sydney
19:30 AEDT	Hamilton 44'; Cooney-Cross 90+2'	Report	Fowler 39' (pen.)	Stadium: Marconi Stadium; Attendance: 787; Referee: Rebecca Durcau

22 November 2019 2	Western Sydney Wanderers	1–0	Newcastle Jets	Sydney
17:00 AEDT	Harrison 59' (pen.)	Report		Stadium: CommBank Stadium; Attendance: 2,992; Referee: Kelly Jones

28 November 2019 3	Brisbane Roar	1–3	Western Sydney Wanderers	Brisbane
18:30 AEST	Baisden 55'	Report	Hamilton 10', 45', 64'	Stadium: Lions Stadium; Attendance: 2,535; Referee: Isabella Blaess

7 December 2019 4	Melbourne Victory	1–1	Western Sydney Wanderers	Morwell
16:00 AEDT	McCutcheon 8'	Report	Williams 62'	Stadium: Latrobe City Stadium; Attendance: 443; Referee: Kelly Jones

20 December 2019 6	Western Sydney Wanderers	5–0	Sydney FC	Sydney
17:00 AEDT	Harrison 4'; Cooney-Cross 6', 42'; Williams 76', 87'	Report		Stadium: CommBank Stadium; Attendance: 2,233; Referee: Lara Lee

26 December 2019 7	Canberra United	0–4	Western Sydney Wanderers	Canberra
19:30 AEDT		Report	Cooney-Cross 38'; O'Sullivan 69'; Hamilton 81'; Williams 85'	Stadium: McKellar Park; Attendance: 1,243; Referee: Rebecca Durcau

12 January 2020 9	Western Sydney Wanderers	0–4	Brisbane Roar	Sydney
16:00 AEDT		Report	Toby 50', 70'; Raso 60'; Davidson 68'	Stadium: Marconi Stadium; Attendance: 1,186; Referee: Rebecca Durcau

19 January 2020 10	Western Sydney Wanderers	3–1	Perth Glory	Sydney
16:00 AEDT	Cooper 3'; Vine 56'; Wallhead 86' (o.g.)	Report	Doeglas 53'	Stadium: CommBank Stadium; Attendance: 3,024; Referee: Isabella Libri

25 January 2020 11	Adelaide United	3–2	Western Sydney Wanderers	Adelaide
19:00 ACDT	Dawber 39'; Weber 39', 46'	Report	Staab 88'; Araújo 90+3' (o.g.)	Stadium: Marden Sports Complex; Attendance: 569; Referee: Isabella Blaess

15 February 2020 12	Sydney FC	3–0	Western Sydney Wanderers	Sydney
17:00 AEDT	Latsko 2'; Brush 14'; Huerta 90+2'	Report		Stadium: Cromer Park; Attendance: 2,309; Referee: Lara Lee

20 February 2020 13	Western Sydney Wanderers	0–4	Melbourne City	Sydney
19:30 AEDT		Report	Emslie 12' (pen.); Carpenter 30', 63'; Watt 86'	Stadium: Marconi Stadium; Attendance: 819; Referee: Rachael Mitchenson

29 February 2020 14	Perth Glory	2–3	Western Sydney Wanderers	Bunbury
19:15 AWST	Celia 62'; Andrews 83'	Report	Staab 3'; Hamilton 11', 28'	Stadium: Hay Park; Attendance: 1,175; Referee: Georgia Ghirardello

==== Finals series ====
15 March 2020 Semi-finals	Melbourne City	5–1	Western Sydney Wanderers	Melbourne
13:30 AEDT	Emslie 13'; Simon 22', 56'; Stott 41'; Nevin 62' (o.g.)	Report	Vine 51'	Stadium: ABD Stadium; Attendance: 612; Referee: Rachael Mitchenson
