= Alex Chidiac =

Australian soccer player (born 1999)

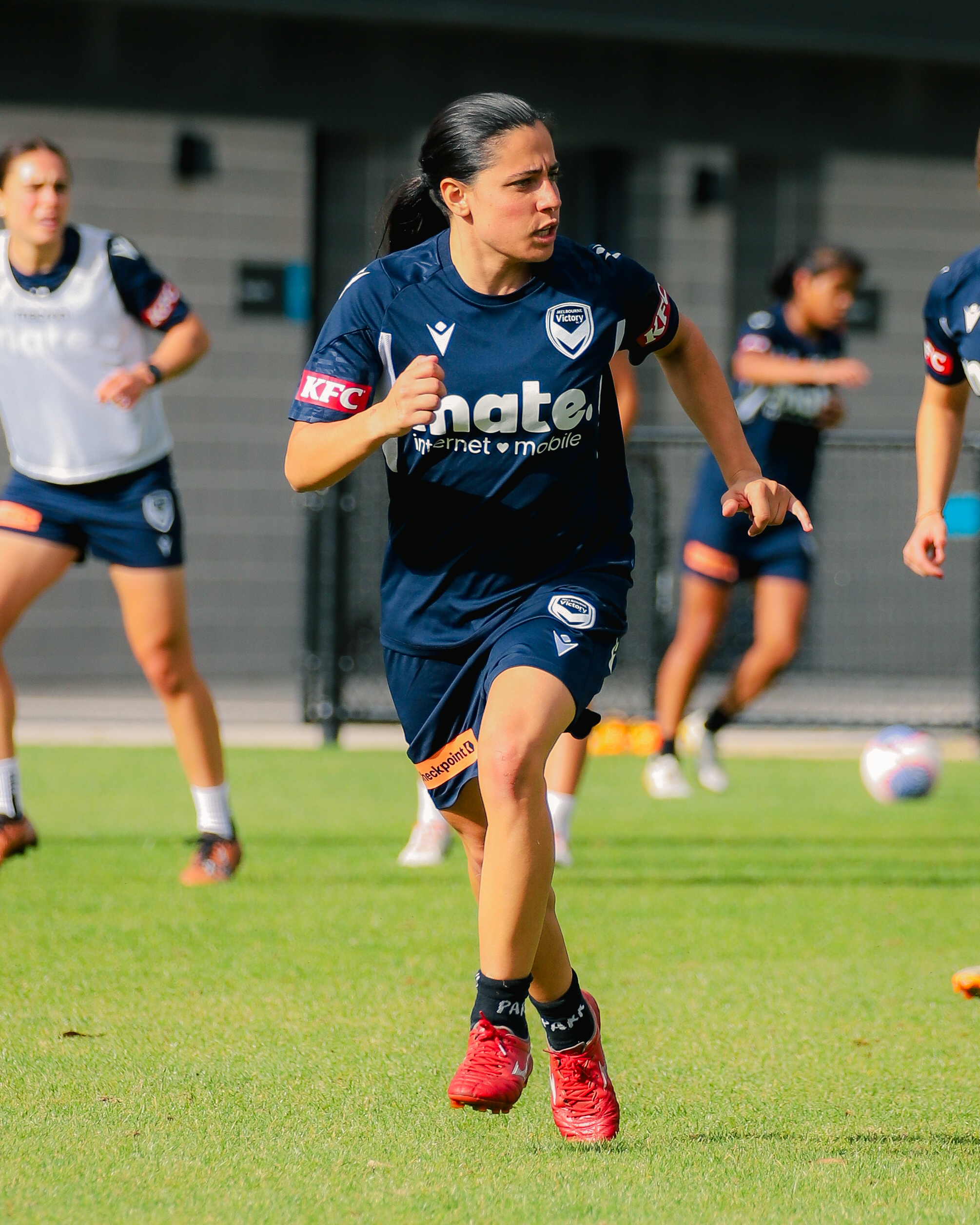
- Chidiac with Melbourne Victory in 2023

Personal information
- Full name: Alexandra Carla Chidiac
- Date of birth: 15 January 1999 (age 27)
- Place of birth: Sydney, New South Wales, Australia
- Height: 1.60 m (5 ft 3 in)
- Positions: Attacking midfielder; winger

Team information
- Current team: Como

Youth career
- Croydon Kings
- FFSA NTC
- Adelaide City

Senior career*
Years	Team	Apps	(Gls)
2014	Adelaide United	9	(1)
2015–2016	Melbourne City	10	(0)
2016–2018	Adelaide United	28	(4)
2018–2020	Atlético Madrid	22	(3)
2020–2021	Melbourne City	10	(3)
2021–2022	JEF United Chiba	5	(0)
2021–2022	→ Melbourne Victory (loan)	14	(1)
2022–2023	Racing Louisville	26	(2)
2022–2023	→ Melbourne Victory (loan)	13	(6)
2023	→ UANL (loan)	10	(0)
2023–2025	Melbourne Victory	19	(2)
2025–	Como	13	(3)

International career^{‡}
2013–2014	Australia U-17	6	(2)
2014–	Australia U-20	22	(17)
2015–	Australia	39	(3)
- * Club domestic league appearances and goals as of 22 April 2026 ‡ National team caps and goals as of 22 April 2026

Alexandra Carla Chidiac (Levantine Arabic: [ʃiˈdjaːk] chi-DEE-yak; born 15 January 1999) is an Australian professional soccer player who plays as a midfielder for Serie A Femminile club FC Como and the Australia national team.

== Early life and education ==
Chidiac was born in Sydney, New South Wales, but moved to Adelaide, South Australia, when she was three months old, and considers herself South Australian.

Chidiac began playing youth football with Croydon Kings where she played alongside boys. In 2011, Chidiac won the under-14B-grade premiership. She was selected to play in the Football Federation South Australia Women's Premier League with an FFSA Under 14/15 team. In 2013, Chidiac was named Premier League player of the year after scoring 33 goals. When she played at the National Youth Championships in Coffs Harbour in July 2013, she was pronounced player of the tournament.

She attended St. Mary's College in Adelaide, taking classes by correspondence when she moved to Melbourne. After moving to Melbourne, Chidiac shared a home at La Trobe University with four other interstate players.

== Club career ==
Ahead of the 2014 W-League season, Chidiac was signed by Adelaide United. On 21 September 2014, she made her debut in a 1–0 loss to Canberra United. On 23 November 2014, she scored her first goal in a 2–2 draw with Western Sydney Wanderers. She finished the season with one goal in 9 appearances.

In September 2015, Chidiac signed with new W-League club Melbourne City, becoming the youngest member on Joe Montemurro's star-studded squad. On 18 October 2015, she made her debut in a 6–0 win over Sydney FC. She made a total of 10 appearances and was part of Melbourne City's unbeaten season, which saw the team win the W-League premiership/championship double. She appeared as a late substitute in the 2016 W-League Grand Final.

Chidiac returned to Adelaide United in September 2016, joining re-signing teammate Emily Condon and new coach Mark Jones. She made 8 appearances for the club in the 2016–17 season, scoring two goals. On 21 August 2017, Chidiac signed a new one-year contract with Adelaide United. She finished the 2017–18 season with one goal and three assists in 11 appearances.

On 13 July 2018, Chidiac signed with Atlético Madrid. She made her debut on 8 September 2018. In December 2020, Chidiac mutually terminated her contract with Atlético Madrid and left the club.

In the week after leaving Atlético Madrid, Chidiac returned to Australia and re-joined Melbourne City ahead of the 2020–21 W-League season.

In June 2021, Chidiac joined JEF United Chiba to play in the inaugural season of the WE League. In December 2021, Melbourne Victory signed Chidiac on loan from JEF United Chiba.

Following her loan in Australia, Chidiac joined American club Racing Louisville on a free transfer, signing a one-year contract in April 2022, three weeks into their season. In October 2022, Melbourne Victory announced that Chidiac would return to the club for the 2022–23 A-League Women on loan from Racing Louisville. On 15 February 2023, Chidiac's loan ended, having scored 6 goals in 13 appearances. Despite being on loan and playing only 13 (out of 20) of the club's matches, Chidiac won the Julie Dolan Medal as the best player of the season. In August 2023, Racing Louisville announced that Chidac would be sent on loan to Liga MX Femenil club Tigres UANL until December 2023. Louisville waived Chidiac in November 2023.

On 30 December 2023, Melbourne Victory announced Chidiac's return to the club on a permanent transfer until the end of the 2025–26 season.

In July 2025, Chidiac joined Italian club Como, netting Melbourne Victory a club record transfer fee.

== International career ==
In early 2015, Chidiac was called up to the senior Australia squad to tour New Zealand, aged sixteen. She made her international debut on 12 February 2015, coming on as a substitute for Lisa De Vanna in a win over New Zealand.

Chidiac was called up again ahead of the 2017 Algarve Cup, where she made two appearances.

In July 2023, Chidiac was selected in Australia's squad for the 2023 Women's World Cup to be held in Australia and New Zealand.

== Personal life ==
Chidiac is of Egyptian, Polish, and Lebanese descent. She made a guest appearance on Guy Montgomery's Guy Mont-Spelling Bee in 2024.

She is in relationship with her girlfriend Erin Clout. in September 2024, they announced their engagement.

== Career statistics ==
=== Club ===
As of April 3, 2026

Club	Season	League			Cup^{1}		Continental^{2}		Total	
Club	Season	Division	Apps	Goals	Apps	Goals	Apps	Goals	Apps	Goals
Adelaide United	2014–15	W-League	9	1	—		—		9	1
Melbourne City	2015–16	W-League	10	0	—		—		10	0
Adelaide United	2016–17	W-League	8	2	—		—		8	2
Adelaide United	2017–18	W-League	11	1	—		—		11	1
Adelaide United	Total		28	4	0	0	0	0	28	4
Atlético Madrid	2018–19	Primera División	19	3	1	0	0	0	20	3
Atlético Madrid	2019–20	Primera División	1	0	0	0	1	0	2	0
Atlético Madrid	2020–21	Primera División	2	0	0	0	0	0	2	0
Atlético Madrid	Total		22	3	1	0	1	0	24	3
Melbourne City	2020–21	W-League	10	3	—		—		10	3
JEF United Chiba Ladies	2021-22	WE League	5	0	—		—		5	0
Melbourne Victory (loan)	2021-22	W-League	14	1	—		—		14	1
Melbourne Victory (loan)	Total		29	4	0	0	0	0	29	4
Racing Louisville	2022	NWSL	18	2	—		—		18	2
Racing Louisville	2023	NWSL	8	0	—		—		8	0
Melbourne Victory (loan)	2022-23	W-League	13	6	—		—		13	6
Tigres UANL (loan)	2023-24	Liga MX Femenil	9	0	—		—		3	0
Melbourne Victory	2023–24	A-League Women	14	2	—		—		14	2
Melbourne Victory	2024–25	A-League Women	25	2	—		—		25	2
Melbourne Victory	Total		39	4	0	0	0	0	39	4
FC Como	2025–26	Serie A	13	3	1	0	—		14	3
Career total			179	26	2	0	1	0	182	26

^{1}Copa de la Reina.

^{2}UEFA Women's Champions League

=== International ===
Scores and results list Australia's goal tally first.

No.	Date	Venue	Opponent	Score	Result	Competition
1	26 March 2018	Perth Oval, Perth, Australia	Thailand	1–0	5–0	Friendly
2	22 February 2023	McDonald Jones Stadium, Newcastle, Australia	Jamaica	2–0	3–0	2023 Cup of Nations
3	11 April 2026	Nyayo National Stadium, Nairobi, Kenya	Malawi	3–0	5–0	2026 FIFA Series

== Honours ==
Melbourne City

- W-League Premiership: 2015–16
- W-League Championship: 2015–16

Atlético Madrid

- Primera División: 2018–19

Melbourne Victory

- W-League Championship: 2021–22

Australia

- Tournament of Nations: 2017
- FFA Cup of Nations: 2019, 2023
- FIFA Series: 2026

Individual

- Julie Dolan Medal: 2023 & 2024-25
- PFA Young Women's Footballer of the Year: 2017, 2018
