= Courtney Newbon =

Australian soccer player (born 2000)

- Newbon playing for Melbourne Victory in 2026

Personal information
- Date of birth: 14 September 2000 (age 26)
- Place of birth: Hobart, Tasmania, Australia
- Position: Goalkeeper

Team information
- Current team: Melbourne Victory
- Number: 1

Senior career*
Years	Team	Apps	(Gls)
2015–2017	Football NSW		
2018	Bankstown City		
2019–2022	Sydney University		
2019–2021	Western Sydney	8	(0)
2021–2022	Perth Glory	5	(0)
2023	Sydney Olympic		
2023–2024	Central Coast	4	(0)
2024–	Melbourne Victory	62	(0)
- * Club domestic league appearances and goals as of 16 October 2026

Courtney Newbon (born 14 September 2000) is an Australian soccer player, who is the goalkeeper for Melbourne Victory in the A-League Women. She had previously kept for Western Sydney, Perth Glory and Central Coast.

== Early years ==
Courtney Newbon was born in 2000 in Hobart, to Trish and Russell Newbon. The family moved from Tasmania to New South Wales' Sutherland Shire. As a four-year-old, she began playing soccer with Bangor Brumbies in 2005 alongside a team of boys. From 2010 Newbon played for Sutherland Sharks juniors and eventually became their goalkeeper. For tertiary studies she completed a Masters of Clinical Exercise Physiology in 2024.

== Club career ==
Newbon began her senior club career by playing for Football NSW Institute from 2015 to 2017, which competes in the National Premier Leagues NSW Women's (NPL NSW). She switched to another NPL NSW club, Bankstown City for 2018. In the following year the keeper moved to Sydney University in the same league. Her new club finished the 2019 season as both NPL NSW Premiers and Champions.

In November 2019, Newbon signed with W-League (later renamed as A-League Women) team Western Sydney Wanderers for their 2019–20 season. She made her debut on 19 January 2020, being called up as starting keeper when number-one choice, Abby Smith had been injured. Newbon returned to Sydney University during the W-League off-season (mid-2020), which won the 2020 Premiership. After her second Wanderers season, she had made a total of eight appearances for the club. All competitions under Football NSW were cancelled on 12 August 2021, due to the COVID-19 lockdown restrictions.

Newbon transferred to Perth Glory for their 2021–2022 season providing five appearances and keeping two clean sheets. During the A-League's 2022 off-season, Newbon helped Sydney University win their fourth NPL NSW Premiership in a row, and was also awarded that league's Goalkeeper of the Year for 2022. Newbon switched to NPL NSW team, Sydney Olympic in 2023. She joined A-League team, Central Coast Mariners in October 2023 for the 2023-24 season, where she appeared four times and kept one clean sheet. In the A-League off-season she returned to Sydney Olympic.

In January 2024 she transferred to Melbourne Victory in the A-League alongside former Matildas goalkeeper, Lydia Williams, as a replacement for injured, fellow keeper Miranda Templeman. She debuted for Victory after Williams herself was injured in a match. During the 2023–24 season, she appeared 12 times providing four clean sheets. Victory reached the final series but they lost their Elimination final against Central Coast Mariners 2–4 in a penalty shootout, being drawn 0-0 after extra-time.

For the following Victory season, Newbon had 23 appearances and provided the most clean sheets for any club with 11. Victory finished second to Premiers and cross town rivals, Melbourne City and runner-up to Champions, Central Coast Mariners.

After keeping seven clean sheets in the 2025–26 season, Newbon shared the A-League Women Golden Glove with Wellington Phoenix's Victoria Esson, and was subsequently named Goalkeeper of the Year. She was selected for the A-Leagues All Stars Women on 12 August in the squad, which played a friendly against Women's Super League (WSL) club Chelsea in the 2026 game at Allianz Stadium in Moore Park as part of the 2026 Sydney Super Cup. The All Stars lost 0–3 to Chelsea. As from October 2026, her A-League career total of clean sheets reached 25 from 79 appearances at various clubs.

== Honours ==
Club:

- NPL NSW: Sydney University Premiers: (2019, 2020, 2022); Champions (2019)
- A-League Women: Melbourne Victory Second: (2024–25); Runners-up: (2024–25)

Individual

- NPL NSW: Sydney University Goalkeeper of the Year (2022)
- A-League Women: Goalkeeper of the Year (2026)
