= Nicki Flannery =

Australian football player

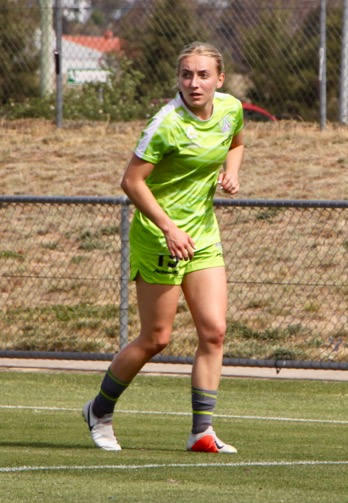

Personal information
- Full name: Nickoletta Flannery
- Date of birth: 26 February 1999 (age 27)
- Place of birth: Australia
- Position: Striker

Team information
- Current team: Melbourne Victory
- Number: 11

Senior career*
Years	Team	Apps	(Gls)
2015–2019	Canberra United	36	(5)
2019–2020	Newcastle Jets	10	(1)
2020–2021	Canberra United	13	(4)
2022	APIA Leichhardt	17	(6)
2022–2024	Canberra United	38	(6)
2024–	Melbourne Victory	26	(5)
2025	→ Apollon Limassol (loan)	0	(0)
- * Club domestic league appearances and goals as of 6 August 2025 ‡ National team caps and goals as of 6 August 2025

Nickoletta Flannery (born 22 February 1999) is an Australian soccer player who plays for A-League Women club Melbourne Victory. She has previously played for A-League Women clubs Canberra United and Newcastle Jets and Cypriot Women's First Division club Apollon Limassol.

== Club career ==
=== Canberra United ===
In September 2015, Flannery joined Canberra United ahead of the 2015–16 W-League season. Flannery had her 2017–18 W-League season cut short when she tore a ligament in her foot in December 2017.

=== Newcastle Jets ===
In October 2019, Flannery joined Newcastle Jets.

=== Return to Canberra United ===
In October 2020, Flannery returned to Canberra United. In July 2024, Flannery left the club to take up another opportunity.

=== Melbourne Victory ===
In August 2024, Flannery joined Melbourne Victory.

=== Apollon Ladies (loan) ===
Flannery played twice on loan in 2025–26 UEFA Women's Champions League qualifying for Cypriot club Apollon Ladies.

=== Return to Melbourne Victory ===
Flannery re-joined the Victory ahead of the 2025–26 A-League Women season.

== Personal life ==
Flannery is of Greek descent.
