= Ellie Wilson =

English footballer (born 1997)

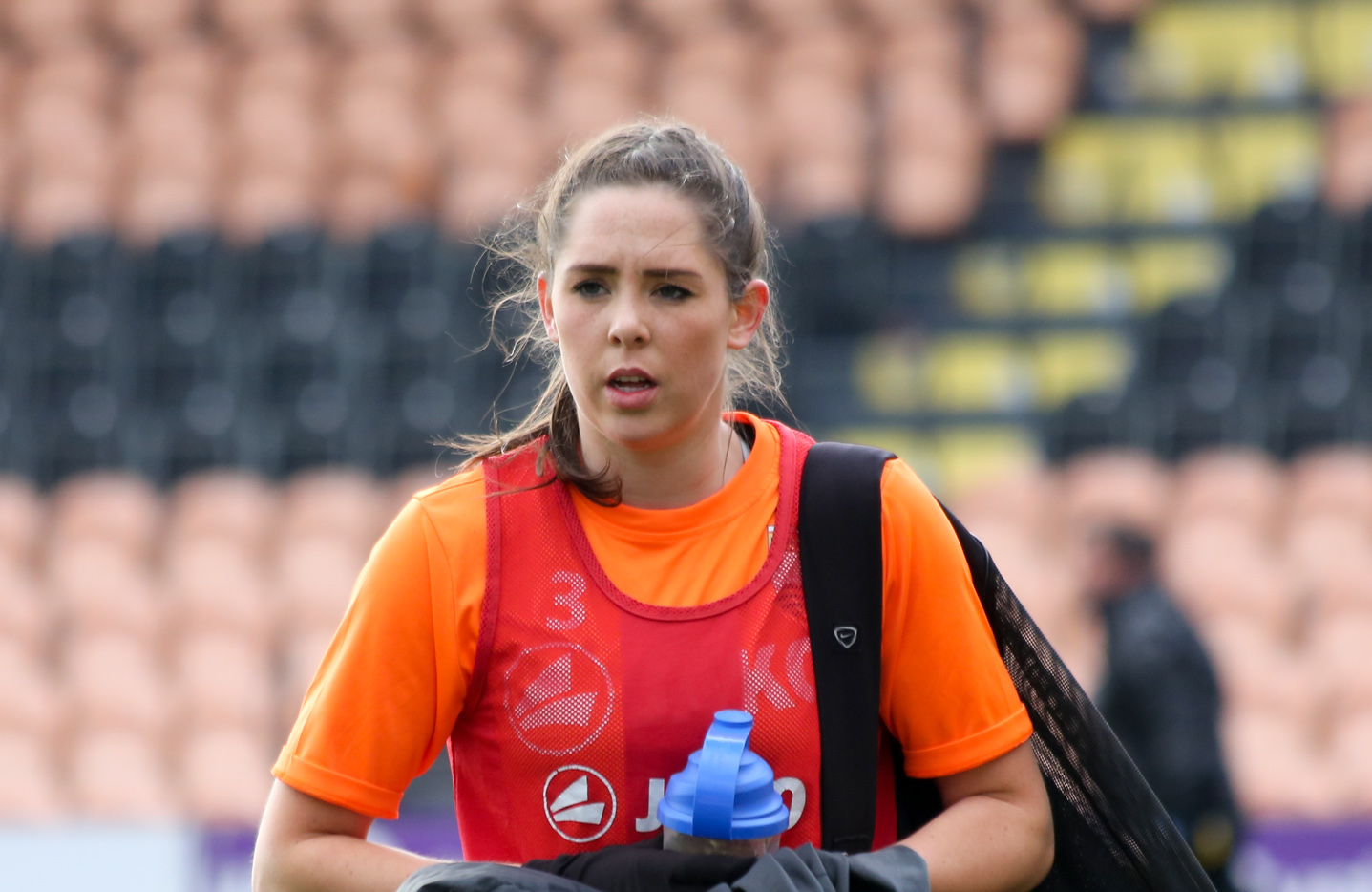
- Ellie Wilson with London Bees before the start of a match on 10 February 2019

Personal information
- Full name: Eloise Jayne Wilson
- Date of birth: 11 May 1997 (age 29)
- Place of birth: Windsor, Berkshire, England
- Height: 1.72 m (5 ft 8 in)
- Positions: Defender; midfielder

Senior career*
Years	Team	Apps	(Gls)
2015	Reading	2	(0)
2016–2018	Bristol City	11	(1)
2018–2020	London Bees	21	(1)
2020–2023	Sheffield United	33	(3)
2023–2024	Wolverhampton Wanderers	27	(8)
2024–2025	Melbourne Victory	16	(1)
2025–2026	Melbourne City	8	(0)

International career^{‡}
2015–2016	England U-19	6	(0)
2016	England U-20	3	(0)
2018	England U-23	1	(0)
- * Club domestic league appearances and goals as of 31 August 2026 ‡ National team caps and goals as of 24 October 2016

Eloise Jayne Wilson (born 11 May 1997) is an English footballer who last played as a defender for A-League Women club Melbourne City. She previously played for Reading F.C., Bristol City, London Bees, Sheffield United, Wolverhampton Wanderers, and Melbourne Victory. She has represented England Women's national team at under-19, under-20 and under-23 level. She has also represented Team GB at the World University Games in 2017.

== Club career ==
=== Reading, 2014–2015 ===
Wilson played for Reading for the 2015 FA WSL season. She made two appearances for the team. Reading finished in first place with a 14–1–3 record securing promotion to FA WSL 1 for the 2016 season.

=== Bristol City, 2016–2018 ===
Wilson signed with Bristol City in January 2016 ahead of the 2016 FA WSL season. She made 11 appearances for the team and helped secure a second-place result with a 10–3–3 record and promotion to FA WSL 1.

=== Melbourne Victory, 2024–2025 ===
In August 2024, Wilson moved to Australia, signing with A-League Women club Melbourne Victory for the 2024–25 A-League Women season. In September 2025, following the end of the season and the conclusion of her contract, Wilson departed the club.

=== Melbourne City, 2025–2026 ===
In September 2025, Wilson joined cross-city rivals Melbourne City for the 2025–26 A-League Women season. She made eight appearances for the club and departed in August 2026, at the conclusion of her contract.

== International career ==
Wilson has represented England on the under-19 national team. In 2016, she was called up to training for the under-20 national team.

== Honours ==
with Reading F.C.

- FA WSL 2 Winner: 2015

with Bristol City

- FA WSL 2 Winner: 2016

with Melbourne City F.C.

- A-League Premiership Winner: 2026
- A-League Championship Winner: 2026
