= Sara D'Appolonia =

American soccer player (born 1999)

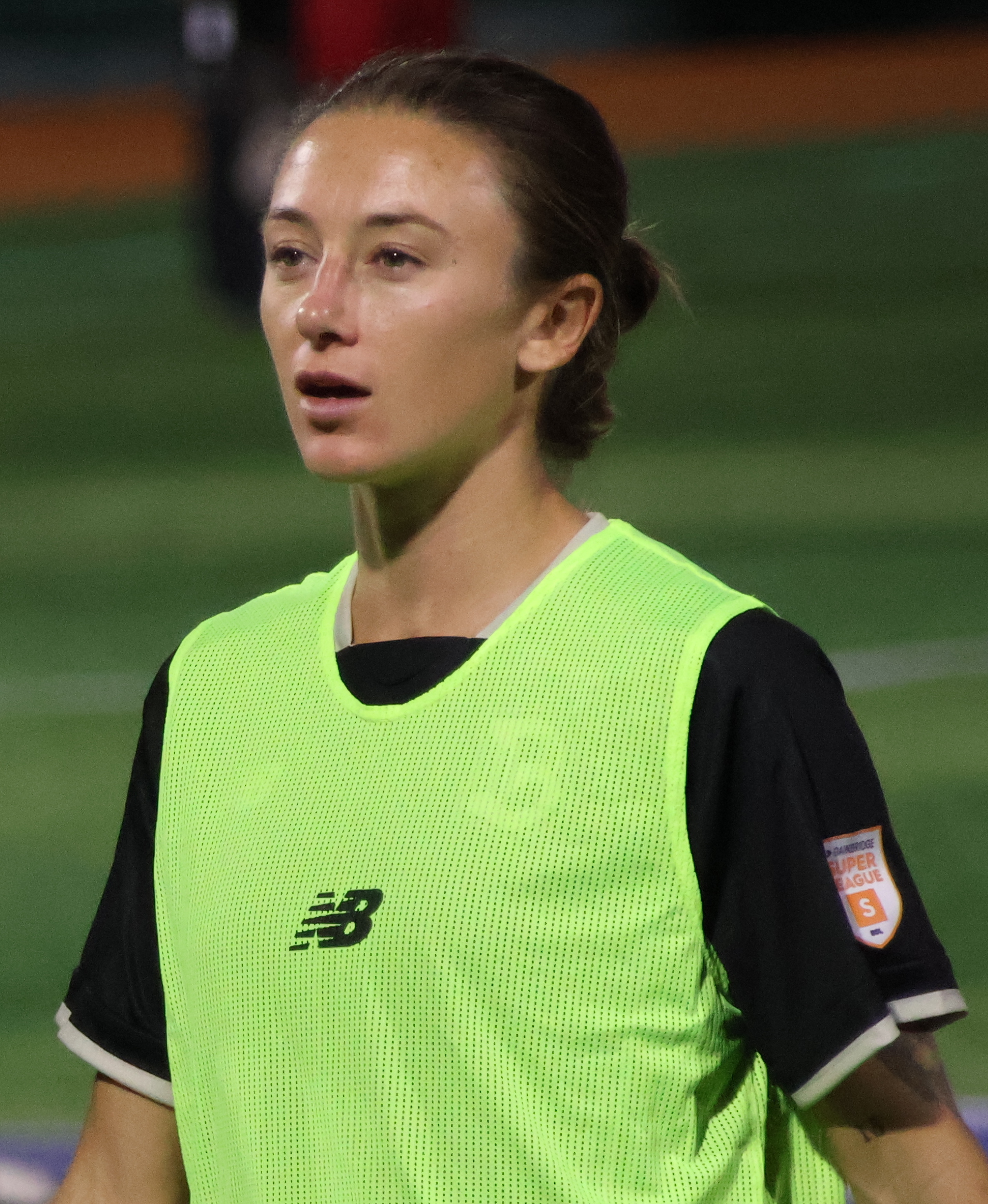
- D'Appolonia with Brooklyn FC in 2026

Personal information
- Full name: Sara Elizabeth D'Appolonia
- Date of birth: November 5, 1999 (age 27)
- Place of birth: Portland, Maine, U.S.
- Height: 5 ft 7 in (1.70 m)
- Positions: Midfielder; winger

Team information
- Current team: Brooklyn FC
- Number: 13

Youth career
- 2013–2015: Global Premier Soccer
- 2016: New England FC
- 2016–2017: Seacoast United Mariners

College career
Years	Team	Apps	(Gls)
2018–2022	Delaware Fightin' Blue Hens	77	(17)

Senior career*
Years	Team	Apps	(Gls)
2023	Peninsula Power FC	26	(17)
2023–2025	Melbourne Victory	47	(1)
2025–2026	SC Sand	14	(1)
2026–	Brooklyn FC	0	(0)
- * Club domestic league appearances and goals as of 02:11, August 22, 2026 (UTC)

Sara Elizabeth D'Appolonia (born November 5, 1999) is an American professional soccer player who plays as a midfielder for USL Super League club Brooklyn FC. She played college soccer for the Delaware Fightin' Blue Hens before starting her professional career in Australia with Peninsula Power FC and Melbourne Victory FC.

== Early life ==
D'Appolonia was born in Portland, Maine, and grew up in the nearby town of Yarmouth. She started playing soccer at age five and also participated in other sports, including track and field and basketball. She attended Yarmouth High School, where she played for four years on the varsity basketball and soccer teams. With the soccer team, D'Appolonia led the program to back-to-back state championships, scoring a total of 63 goals across her high school career. She became the first Yarmouth player to be an All-American selection and was also recognized as the 2017 Maine Gatorade girls' soccer player of the year. D'Appolonia also played club soccer for multiple teams, including Global Premier Soccer, New England FC, and WPSL PRO club Seacoast United Mariners.

== College career ==
D'Appolonia played five seasons with the Delaware Fightin' Blue Hens. In her freshman year, she played in all 18 games and started in all but two. She then proceeded to have a breakout sophomore year, helping lift the team to a CAA semifinal appearance and gaining individual recognition as a member of the 2019 All-CAA First Team and CAA All-Tournament team. She was the Fightin' Blue Hens' top goalscorer for two years in a row and was also named to the All-CAA Third Team in her senior year at Delaware. D'Appolonia left the program with 77 appearances and 17 goals recorded.

== Club career ==
On January 23, 2023, D'Appolonia signed her first professional contract with Australian team Peninsula Power FC in the National Premier Leagues. Within one season, she was able to score 17 goals and make 26 appearances for the Redcliffe club.

After playing a season with Peninsula Power, D'Appolonia executed a deadline day move to A-League Women club Melbourne Victory in October 2023. She made her club debut on October 14, playing in a 2–1 defeat to Brisbane Roar. The team placed fourth in the standings and advanced to the first round of the 2024 Finals Series, where they lost on penalties to the Central Coast Mariners. On December 21, 2024, D'Appolonia scored her first goal with Melbourne, a long-distance strike in a 2–0 victory over Canberra United. In her two seasons with the Victory, D'Appolonia appeared in 47 matches.

On 14 August 2025, D'Appolonia signed with 2. Frauen-Bundesliga team SC Sand, joining former Melbourne Victory teammate Alana Murphy. She spent one season with the German club.

In August 2026, D'Appolonia joined Brooklyn FC of the USL Super League.

== Honors and awards ==
Individual

- First-team All-CAA: 2019
- Third-team All-CAA: 2020
- CAA tournament all-tournament team: 2019
