= The Home of the Matildas =

Melbourne association football stadium

- HOTM
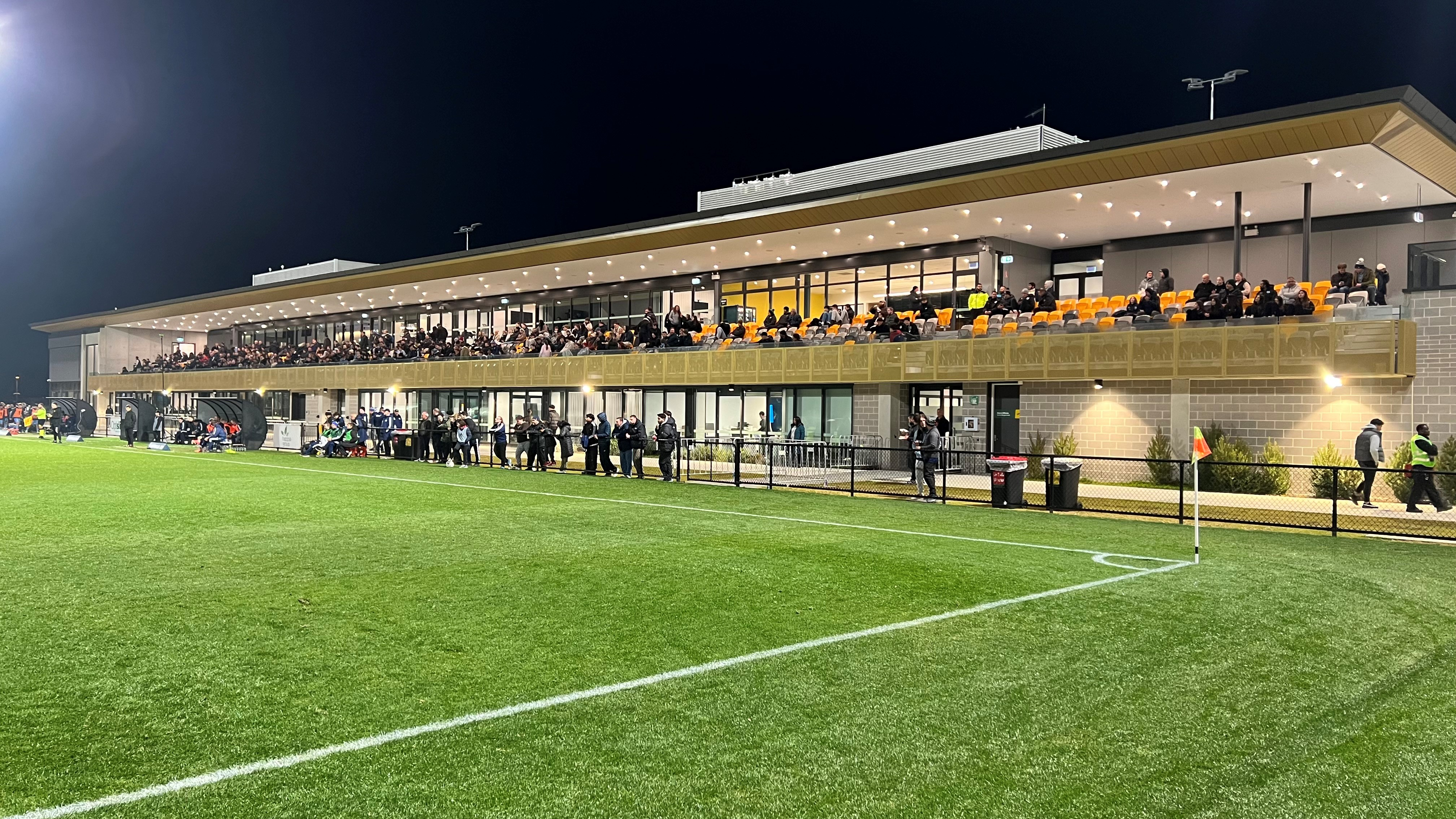
- Interactive map of The Home of the Matildas
- Address: Sports Dr, Bundoora VIC 3083
- Location: Bundoora, Melbourne
- Coordinates: 37.72320°S 145.04198°E
- Capacity: 3,500 (2,300 seated)
- Surface: Grass
- Record attendance: 2,588 (Melbourne Victory v Brisbane Roar, 15 October 2023)
- Field shape: Rectangular
- Public transit: Tram route 86

Construction
- Built: 2023
- Opened: 3 July 2023
- Years active: 2023–present
- Cost: $57 million

Tenants
- Australia women's national soccer team (Training) (2023–present); Melbourne Victory (A-League Women) (2023–present); Melbourne Victory FC Youth (2025–present); Melbourne Victory FC AWT (2024)

The Home of the Matildas (HOTM) is an association football stadium in Bundoora, Melbourne, Australia.

It was intended to be the home base of the Australia women's national soccer team, and is the home of Melbourne Victory in the A-League Women, Melbourne Victory FC Youth in the National Premier Leagues Victoria, and the Melbourne Victory Afghan Women's Team in the Women's State League 2 South-East in 2024. It has an 800 capacity grandstand, and a total venue capacity of 3,500.

== History ==
=== Background and host selection ===
La Trobe University had been the host of Melbourne City FC's City Football Academy, the club training facility in the southern edge of the University precinct at a cost of $15 million. They remained there until moving to a new facility at Casey Fields, with the Bundoora facility demolished at the closure in 2021.

In 2019 Football Victoria proposed a home base for the Australia women's national soccer team, The Matildas, to be built in Victoria after attracting interest from municipalities across the state. A $200,000 grant from the Andrews Government was funded into the establishment of the venue and state-of-the-art facility to host training camps and elite pathway programs for national teams, representative teams and coaching/development programs. The bids to host the venue were short-listed on 19 June 2019 and were between Brimbank, Casey, Darebin, Maroondah and La Trobe University (Bundoora). The Victorian Government further provided $1.5 million into plan and design for The Home of the Matildas on 30 August 2020. The host was announced as Bundoora and La Trobe University on 16 May 2021 and allowed the beginning of construction onwards, with construction due to be completed prior to the 2023 FIFA Women's World Cup.

The facility cost of $42.29 million was funded within the grants for the wider La Trobe Sports Park. Government grants for the precinct included $15 million from the Federal Government, $101 million from the Victorian State Government and $5 million from the City of Banyule Council. The first two stages of the Sports Park precinct were funded by the University at a cost of $80 million. and the Victorian government allocating $101.5 million towards the project, alongside the $1.5 million that was spent on planning. The upgrades include a marquee pitch with grandstand seating; four other pitches (Hybrid, natural grass, synthetic), a futsal court, and high-performance facilities including a gymnasium and wet recovery area, medical and rehabilitation centre, meeting areas and player lounge.

=== Official opening ===
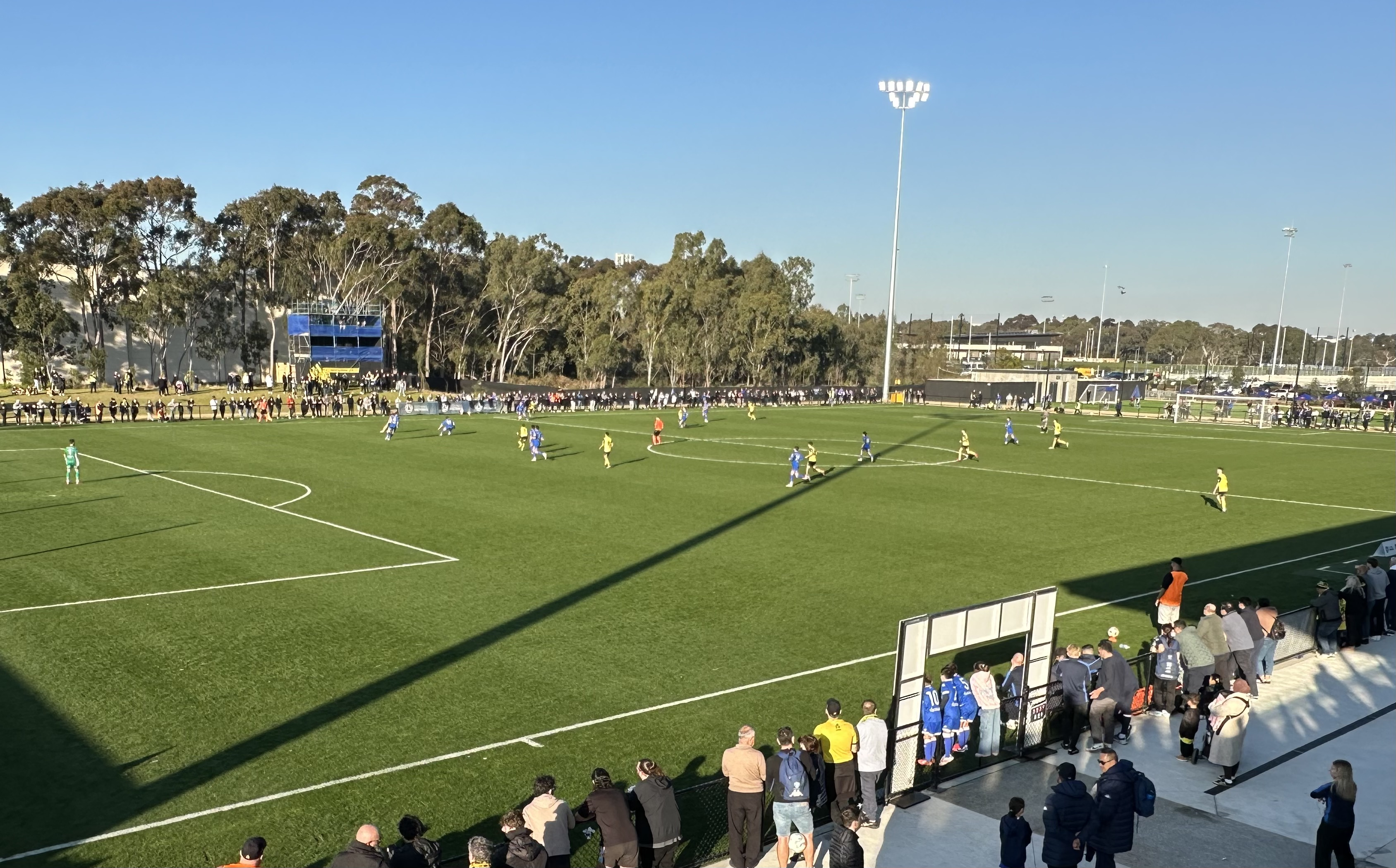
The main pitch at the venue, as seen during the 2025 Dockerty Cup Final

The Home of the Matildas was officially opened on 3 July 2023 by Victorian sport minister Steve Dimopoulos as the first and biggest association football infrastructure projects in Australian history.

On 31 August 2023, the venue was selected to host Melbourne Victory's stand-alone A-League Women matches. The Victory played their first home match at the venue on 15 October 2023 against Brisbane Roar, with the match attracting an attendance of 2,588.

Since April 2024, the venue serves as the home ground for the Melbourne Victory Afghan Women's Team. The AWT played their first home match at the venue on 28 April 2024 against Pascoe Vale FC, with the AWT winning 3-2.

The venue will serve as the home ground for Melbourne Victory FC Youth for the 2025 National Premier Leagues Victoria season.

== Structure and facilities ==
Described as a "world-class facility" by Football Victoria, The Home of the Matildas features a FIFA and AFC compliant elite training facility with an extra five pitches involving two Premium pitches and three standard FIFA pitches. The grandstand features 800 seats along with a terrace/balcony for standing rooms and overlooking the main pitch. The indoor interiors of the venue features a high-performance gym, sports science/high performance with also an elite-level recovery area, multiple change rooms including a circular locker room for the Matildas and a referee change room, function spaces, public cafe, dining room for players, lounge, study spaces, 2 sleep rooms, property office, and administration office for Football Victoria.

The pitch is expected to be utilized by the Matildas for 140 days each year, with the pitch being used for 6,000 hours annually by La Trobe University students for around 20 hours a week, grassroots clubs, and training for volunteers and administrators. These new upgrades are expected to encourage research collaboration between high-performance expects and academics at La Trobe University.

This area will also incorporate the Victorian State Rugby centre, which will possess a show pitch with grandstand seating, two additional pitches, and high performance facilities including a gymnasium, sport science, medical and recovery areas and a training and match day home for the Melbourne Rebels’ Super W team.
