= Claudia Bunge =

New Zealand footballer (born 1999)

Personal information
- Full name: Claudia Mary Bunge
- Date of birth: 21 September 1999 (age 27)
- Place of birth: Auckland, New Zealand
- Height: 1.73 m (5 ft 8 in)
- Position: Defender

Team information
- Current team: Melbourne Victory
- Number: 3

Senior career*
Years	Team	Apps	(Gls)
2016–	Glenfield Rovers		
–2020	Northern Lights		
2020–2023	Melbourne Victory	45	(4)
2022	Northern Tigers	8	(1)
2023–2024	HB Køge	12	(1)
2024–	Melbourne Victory	47	(6)

International career^{‡}
2016	New Zealand U17	10	(1)
2018–	New Zealand U20	6	(0)
2019–	New Zealand	42	(1)
- * Club domestic league appearances and goals as of 23 May 2026. ‡ National team caps and goals as of 23 May 2026.

Claudia Mary Bunge (/ˈbʌndʒ/; born 21 September 1999) is a New Zealand footballer who currently plays for Melbourne Victory and the New Zealand women's national football team.

== Club career ==
Bunge started playing club football for Glenfield Rovers, she first played senior women's football at the age of 14 for Glenfield Rovers in the Loto Northern Premier League. She made an appearance as a substitute in the 2014 Kate Sheppard Cup Final (National Knock-Out Competition) as Glenfield Rovers beat Forrest Hill Milford 3–2. Playing for the Rovers, Bunge has been part of the team to finish runner-up in the 2016 Kate Sheppard Cup that was then known as the Women's Knockout Cup. They then won the Kate Sheppard Cup in 2017. Bunge was also part of the team that won the Lotto NRFL Premier Women league in 2018.

Bunge also played in the New Zealand Football run National Women's League where teams are run by the regional federations. Bunge played for and captained the Northern Lights.

In November 2020, Bunge joined Melbourne Victory in the Australian W-League.

On 28 August 2023, HB Køge announced she had signed for the club.

In August 2024, Bunge returned to Melbourne Victory.

== International career ==
Bunge was a member of the New Zealand U-17 who won the 2016 OFC U-17 Women's Championship side at the 2016 FIFA U-17 Women's World Cup in Jordan, and the New Zealand U-20 side at the 2018 FIFA U-20 Women's World Cup in France.

Bunge was called up for the New Zealand national team to take part in the Yongchuan International Tournament in China. She made her senior début for the Football Ferns in a 2–0 loss to China on 8 November 2019. She followed up that game with another start for the Ferns against Canada, impressing the coach with her performances.

On 25 June 2021, Bunge was called up to the New Zealand squad for the delayed 2020 Summer Olympics.

Bunge was called up to the New Zealand squad for the 2023 FIFA Women's World Cup.

In February 2024, Bunge was announced as captain for the 2024 OFC Women's Olympic Qualifying Tournament, with usual co-captains Ali Riley and Ria Percival not called up for the tournament. However, Rebekah Stott was named captain for the opening match. Bunge first captained the side in the final group game on 13 February 2024 against Vanuatu, also winning player of the match.

On 4 July 2024, Bunge was called up to the New Zealand squad for the 2024 Summer Olympics.

== Career statistics ==
=== Club ===
As of match played on 18 May 2025.

Appearances and goals by club, season and competition
Club	Season	League			Cup		Others		Total	
Club	Season	Division	Apps	Goals	Apps	Goals	Apps	Goals	Apps	Goals
Melbourne Victory	2020–21	W-League	14	2	—		—		14	2
Melbourne Victory	2021–22	A-League Women	13	2	—		—		13	2
Melbourne Victory	2022–23	A-League Women	18	0	—		—		18	0
Melbourne Victory	Total		45	4	—		—		45	4
Northern Tigers	2022	NPL NSW	8	1	—		—		8	1
HB Køge	2023–24	Danish Women's League	10	1	0	0	2 (Note: Appearances in UEFA Women's Champions League)	0	12	1
Melbourne Victory	2024–25	A-League Women	25	5	—		—		25	5
Career total			88	11	0	0	2	0	90	11

=== International ===
As of match played on 19 February 2024.

Appearances and goals by national team and year
National team	Year	Apps	Goals
New Zealand	2019	2	0
New Zealand	2020	2	0
New Zealand	2021	1	0
New Zealand	2022	11	0
New Zealand	2023	8	0
New Zealand	2024	4	0
Total		28	0

== International goals ==
No.	Date	Venue	Opponent	Score	Result	Competition
1.	5 March 2026	National Stadium, Honiara, Solomon Islands	American Samoa	2–0	3–0	2027 FIFA Women's World Cup qualification
2.	5 June 2026	Nuevo Estadio El Maulí, Málaga, Spain	Haiti	1–0	1–2	Friendly

== Honours ==
Glenfield Rovers:

- Lotto NRFL Premier Women: 2018
- Women's Knockout Cup: 2017

Melbourne Victory

- A-League Women Championship: 2020–21, 2021–22

New Zealand U17

- OFC U-17 Women's Championship: 2016

New Zealand U20

- OFC U-19 Women's Championship: 2017

New Zealand

- OFC Women's Olympic Qualifying Tournament: 2024

Individual

- IFFHS OFC's Best Player: 2022
- IFFHS Women's OFC Team: 2022
