= Ella O'Grady =

Australian soccer player (born 2005)

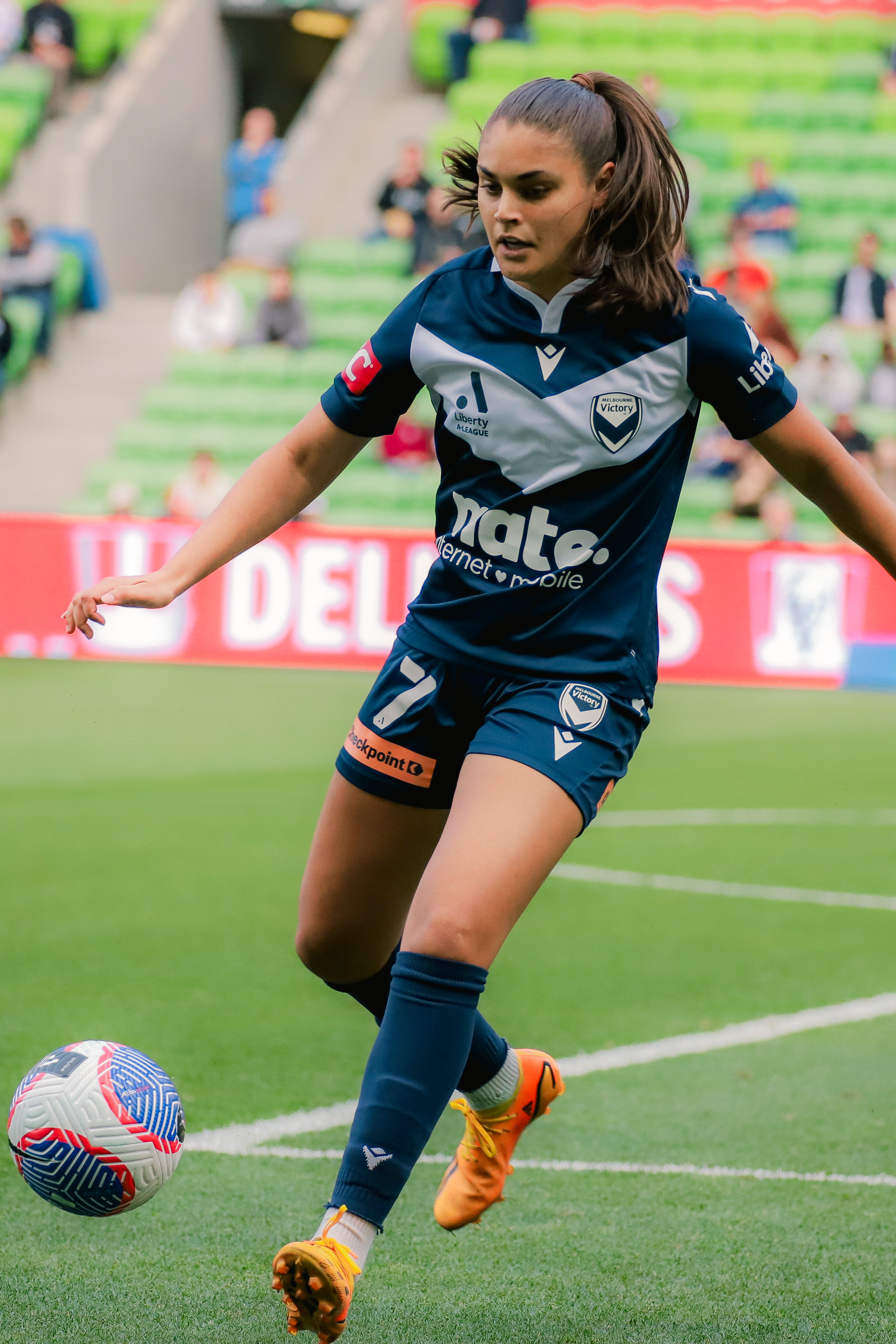
- Ella O'Grady playing for Melbourne Victory, December 2023

Personal information
- Full name: Ella Loudres Kataryna O'Grady
- Date of birth: 14 September 2005 (age 21)
- Place of birth: Dandenong, Victoria, Australia
- Position: Forward

Team information
- Current team: Melbourne Victory
- Number: 7

Senior career*
Years	Team	Apps	(Gls)
2023	Football Queensland QAS	8	(2)
2023–	Melbourne Victory	16	(3)

International career^{‡}
2023–	Australia U20	7	(3)
- * Club domestic league appearances and goals as of 8 January 2025 ‡ National team caps and goals as of 8 September 2024

Ella Loudres Kataryna O'Grady (born 14 September 2005) is an Australian women's soccer forward who plays for Melbourne Victory.

== Honours ==
Melbourne Victory

== Personal life ==
Ella has a brother and three sisters.
