= Rachel Lowe (soccer) =

Australian soccer player

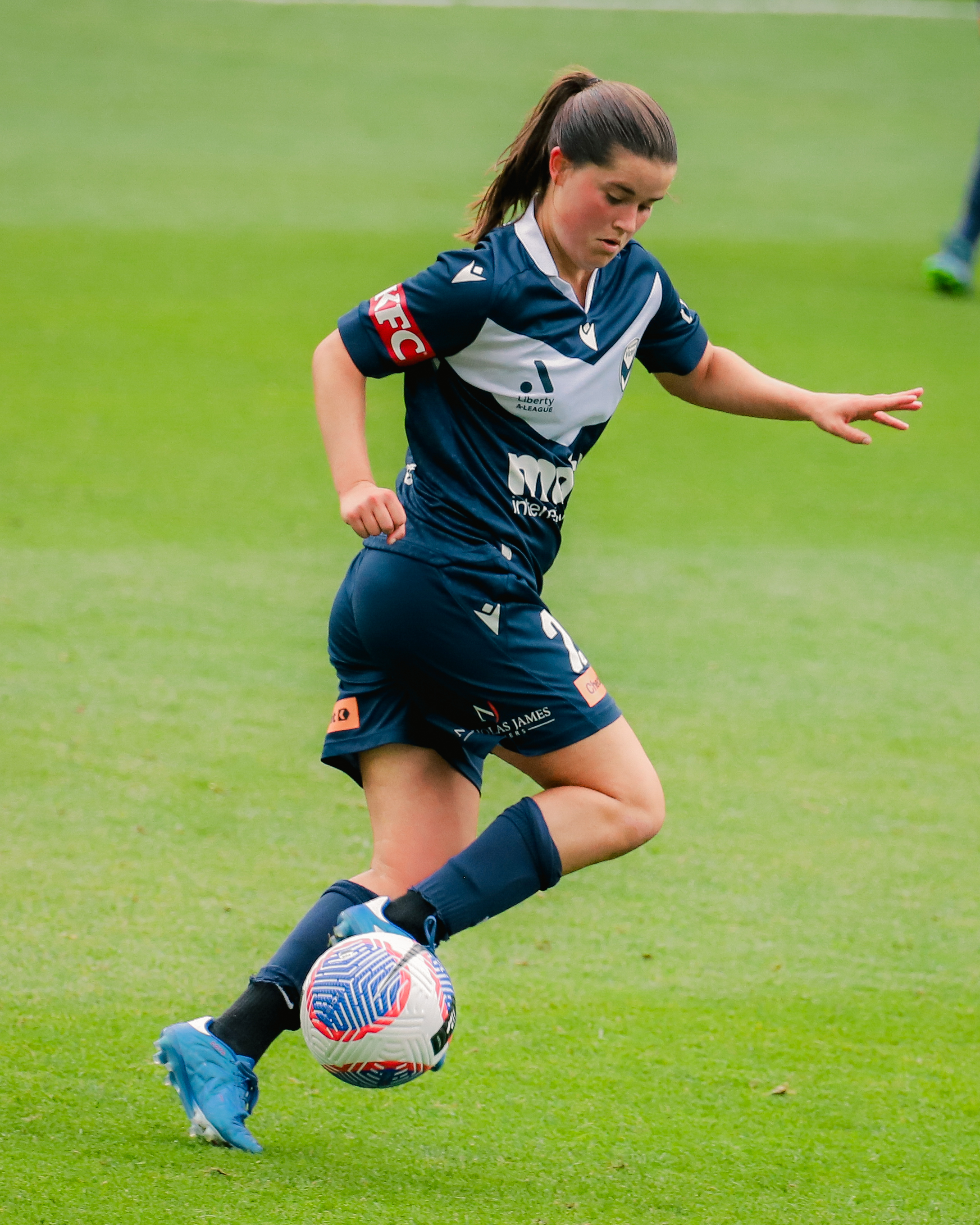
- Rachel Lowe playing for Melbourne Victory, December 2023

Personal information
- Full name: Rachel Georgia Wehl Lowe
- Date of birth: 19 November 2000 (age 26)
- Place of birth: Sydney, Australia
- Height: 1.68 m (5 ft 6 in)
- Positions: Forward; midfielder

Team information
- Current team: Durham

Youth career
- West Pymble FC
- Northern Tigers FC

College career
Years	Team	Apps	(Gls)
2019	UCLA Bruins	11	(1)

Senior career*
Years	Team	Apps	(Gls)
2016–2019	Western Sydney Wanderers	27	(2)
2020–2023	Sydney FC	47	(9)
2022	Sydney University SFC	6	(0)
2023	Sydney Olympic	3	(0)
2023–2026	Melbourne Victory	71	(19)
2026–	Durham	0	(0)

International career^{‡}
	Australia U20	22	(5)
2018–	Australia	1	(0)
- * Club domestic league appearances and goals as of 21 May 2026 ‡ National team caps and goals as of 8 March 2020

Rachel Georgia Wehl Lowe (German: [ʋeːl]; born 19 November 2000) is an Australian soccer player who plays as a forward or midfielder for Women's Super League 2 (WSL 2) club Durham and for the Australia national team. She previously played for Western Sydney Wanderers, Sydney FC, and Melbourne Victory, and played college soccer for UCLA Bruins.

== Early life and education ==
Born in Sydney, Lowe grew up in the Inner West and Northern Sydney. She started her football career with West Pymble FC, playing in a mixed team alongside her twin brother, Edward, before joining Northern Tigers FC in 2011. After three seasons with Tigers, she joined the Football New South Wales Institute (FNSWI) program, where she was coached by notable coaches such as Leah Blayney and Craig Foster. She attended Pymbles Ladies' College. A natural sporting talent, Lowe also played girls cricket at State and National level, and for Gordon District Cricket Club.

== College career ==
Lowe committed to UCLA in 2018 and joined the Bruins in 2019. On 23 August 2019, she made her collegiate debut in a 3–0 victory against Iowa State, scoring her first goal in the 58th minute. Lowe chose not to return to the Bruins in 2020.

== Club career ==
From 2016 to 2018, Lowe played for the Football New South Wales Institute (FNSWI) program in the NPL NSW, and scored 19 goals in 42 appearances for the side.

=== Western Sydney Wanderers (2016–2019) ===
At age 15, Lowe signed with the Western Sydney Wanderers for the 2016–17 season and made her debut in Round 2 against Sydney FC. She made a total of 9 appearances for the club in her first season. In September 2017, she re-signed with the Wanderers. She finished the 2017–18 season with 1 goal in 8 appearances. In September 2018, Lowe re-signed for a third season with the club. She finished the 2018–19 season with 1 goal in 10 appearances. In June 2019, Lowe left Australia to join American college team UCLA Bruins.

=== Sydney FC (2020–2023) ===
In August 2020, Lowe returned to Australia and joined previous club's cross-city rivals Sydney FC.

=== Melbourne Victory (2023–2026) ===
In August 2023, Lowe joined her previous club's rivals Melbourne Victory. She departed the club following the conclusion of the 2025–26 A-League Women season.

=== Durham (2026–) ===
Lowe moved to England and signed for Women's Super League 2 (WSL 2) club Durham.

== International career ==
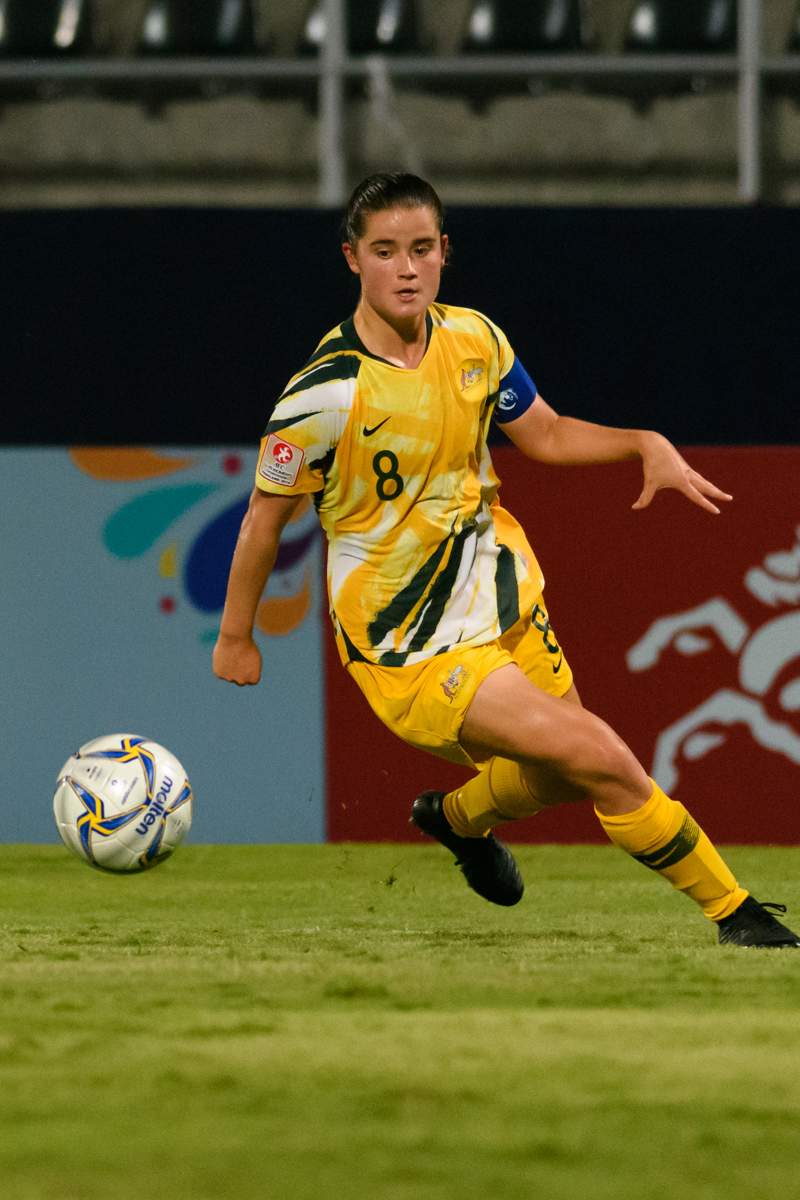
Rachel Lowe during the 2019 AFC U-19 Women's Championship semi-final match vs Japan on 6 November 2019

Lowe was called up to represent Australia at the 2017 AFC U-19 Women's Championship, where she scored in a 5–2 victory against Vietnam, helping her side progress to the semi-finals. She made 5 appearances for Australia U20 at the 2018 AFF Women's Championship, scoring once against Timor-Leste.

In February 2018, Lowe received her first call up to the senior team for the 2018 Algarve Cup in Portugal. She made her senior debut on 5 March 2018, coming on as a substitute in a 2–0 victory over China.
