= Alana Murphy =

Australian soccer player (born 2005)

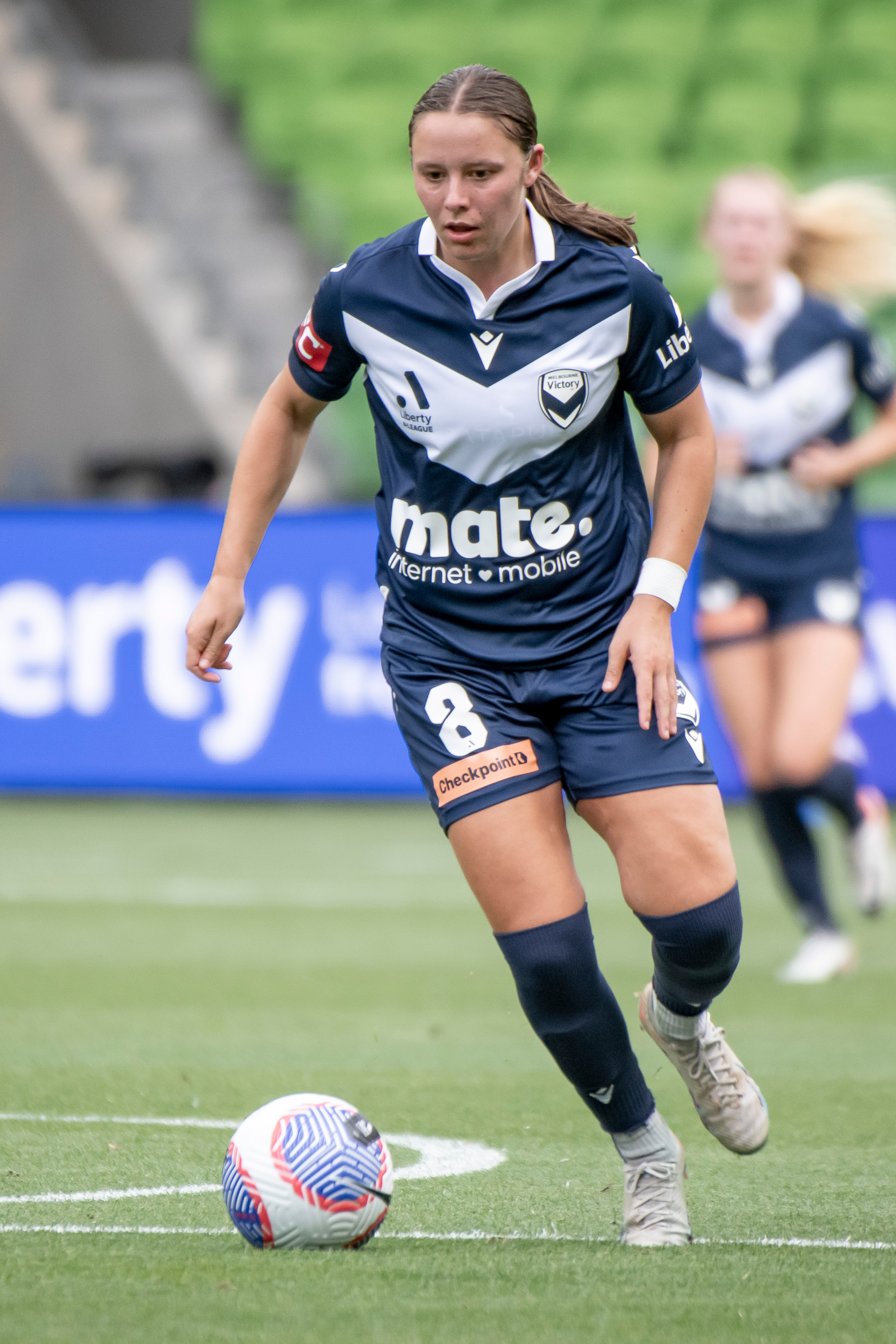
- Murphy playing for Melbourne Victory in 2023

Personal information
- Date of birth: 21 September 2005 (age 21)
- Position: Midfielder

Team information
- Current team: Nottingham Forest
- Number: 31

Senior career*
Years	Team	Apps	(Gls)
2021–2025	Melbourne Victory	75	(4)
2022	→ Blacktown Spartans (loan)	1	(0)
2023	→ Blacktown Spartans (loan)	11	(0)
2025	SC Sand	10	(1)
2026–	Nottingham Forest	16	(3)

International career^{‡}
2019	Australia U16		
2022–	Australia U20	11	(5)
2025–	Australia	7	(0)
- * Club domestic league appearances and goals as of 15 November 2026 ‡ National team caps and goals as of 10 October 2026

Alana Murphy (born 21 September 2005) is an Australian soccer player who plays as a midfielder for Women's Super League 2 club Nottingham Forest and the Australia national team. She previously played for A-League Women club Melbourne Victory and 2. Frauen-Bundesliga club SC Sand.

== Club career ==
Alana attended Rowville Secondary College's, Rowville Sports Academy, as part of their Football program.

Alana Murphy began playing soccer in Langwarrin and, as a junior, she played for Box Hill United and Victoria’s National Training Centre before joining A-league team Melbourne Victory (2021–present) with two stints at Blacktown Spartans (2022, 2023) in New South Wales Premier Leagues.

In August 2025, Murphy left Melbourne Victory at the end of her contract and joined German club SC Sand.

=== Nottingham Forest ===
On 2 February 2026, Murphy signed with Women's Super League 2 club Nottingham Forest on a permanent deal until June 2027.

== International career ==
Murphy played for the Junior Matildas in 2019 and the Young Matildas from 2022. In February 2025, Murphy received her first senior call-up to the Australian national team (the Matildas) for the 2025 SheBelieves Cup as an injury replacement for Clare Wheeler. Upon joining the Matildas squad, Australian Associated Press' writer described Murphy's recent form, "[the] hard-nosed, skilful defensive midfielder has one goal and one assist in 15 games this season."
