= 2025–26 Newcastle Jets FC (women) season =

18th season in existence of Newcastle Jets FC (women)

Newcastle Jets (women)
2025–26 season
- Head Coach: Stephen Hoyle
- Stadium: McDonald Jones Stadium; No.2 Sports Ground; Maitland Sports Ground
- A-League Women: 9th
- A-League Women Finals: DNQ
- Top goalscorer: Melina Ayres (8 goals)
Home colours	Away colours	Third colours
- All statistics correct as of 25 July 2025.

The 2025–26 season was the Newcastle Jets Football Club (women)'s 18th season in the A-League Women.

== Players ==
=== First-team squad ===
As of 5 November 2025

Note: Flags indicate national team as defined under FIFA eligibility rules; some limited exceptions apply. Players may hold more than one non-FIFA nationality.

No.	Pos.	Nation	Player
2	DF	AUS	Josie Wilson
3	DF	AUS	Claudia Cicco
4	DF	AUS	Natasha Prior
5	DF	NZL	Olivia Page
6	MF	AUS	Cassidy Davis (captain)
7	FW	AUS	India Breier
8	MF	AUS	Emma Dundas
9	FW	AUS	Haley Johnson
10	MF	AUS	Libby Copus-Brown
11	DF	NZL	Charlotte Lancaster
12	GK	AUS	Georgia Ritchie

No.	Pos.	Nation	Player
13	FW	AUS	Lauren Allan
14	FW	AUS	Melina Ayres
15	DF	AUS	Emma Bates (scholarship)
18	MF	AUS	Sophie Hoban
23	DF	AUS	Zoe Karipidis (scholarship)
24	GK	NZL	Anna Leat
26	FW	AUS	Josie Allan
30	FW	AUS	Alexis Collins
32	MF	AUS	Claire Adams
44	FW	NZL	Kelli Brown
50	GK	AUS	Ally Boertje

== Transfers ==
=== Transfers in ===
No.	Position	Player	From	Type/fee	Contract length	Date	Ref
24	GK	(New Zealand) Anna Leat	(New Zealand) Eastern Suburbs	Free transfer	1 year	25 July 2025	
14	FW	Melina Ayres	Unattached	Free transfer	1 year	15 August 2025	
12	GK	Georgia Ritchie	Canberra United	Free transfer	1 year	1 September 2025	
44	FW	(New Zealand) Kelli Brown	Perth Glory	Free transfer	1 year	9 September 2025	
5	DF	(New Zealand) Olivia Page	Unattached	Free transfer	1 year	17 September 2025	
11	DF	(New Zealand) Charlotte Lancaster	(Australia) APIA Leichhardt	Free transfer	1 year	19 September 2025	
9	FW	Haley Johnson	(Australia) Northern Tigers	Free transfer	1 year	30 October 2025	

==== From academy squad ====
N	Pos.	Nat.	Name	Age	Notes
15	DF	(Australia)	Emma Bates	21	1-year scholarship contract
23	DF	(Australia)	Zoe Karipidis	20	1-year scholarship contract

=== Transfers out ===
No.	Position	Player	Transferred to	Type/fee	Date	Ref
27	DF	Chloe Walandouw	Unattached	End of contract	30 June 2025	
1	GK	(Canada) Danielle Krzyzaniak	Unattached	End of contract	23 July 2025	
9	DF	Bel Rolley	Unattached	End of contract	23 July 2025	
17	FW	Sheridan Gallagher	Unattached	End of contract	23 July 2025	
22	DF	(Switzerland) Lorena Baumann	Unattached	End of contract	23 July 2025	
23	FW	(United States) Gia Vicari	Unattached	End of contract	23 July 2025	
24	FW	Milan Hammond	Unattached	End of contract	23 July 2025	
25	MF	Lara Gooch	Unattached	End of contract	23 July 2025	
30	GK	Tiahna Robertson	Unattached	End of contract	23 July 2025	
11	FW	(New Zealand) Deven Jackson	Melbourne City	End of contract	28 August 2025	
–	DF	Mia Green	Unattached	End of contract	28 October 2025	

=== Contract extensions ===
No.	Player	Position	Duration	Date	Ref.
26	Josie Allan	Forward	2 years	26 June 2025	
2	Josie Wilson	Defender	1 year	14 July 2025	
6	Cassidy Davis	Defensive midfielder	1 year	7 August 2025	
32	Claire Adams	Midfielder	1 year	14 August 2025	
13	Lauren Allan	Forward	1 year	12 September 2025	
30	Alexis Collins	Forward	1 year	18 September 2025	
50	Ally Boertje	Goalkeeper	1 year	5 November 2025	

== Pre-season and friendlies ==
20 September 2025	Northern NSW All-Stars (Australia)	2–6	(Australia) Newcastle Jets	Newcastle, Australia
15:00 AEST	84'; 90+2'	Report	Breier 15', 24', 40'; Collins 55', 61'; Clifton 78'	Stadium: Darling Street Oval

== Competitions ==
=== Overall record ===
Competition	First match	Last match	Final position	Record							
Competition	First match	Last match	Final position	Pld	W	D	L	GF	GA	GD	Win %
A-League Women	2 November 2025	5 April 2026	9th	20	7	2	11	30	36	−6	35.00
Total				20	7	2	11	30	36	−6	35.00

Last updated: 5 April 2026
Source: Competitions

=== A-League Women ===
==== League table ====
Pos	Team	Pld	W	D	L	GF	GA	GD	Pts
7	Central Coast Mariners	20	7	7	6	27	26	+1	28
8	Perth Glory	20	7	3	10	20	30	−10	24
9	Newcastle Jets	20	7	2	11	30	36	−6	23
10	Sydney FC	20	4	7	9	18	29	−11	19
11	Western Sydney Wanderers	20	5	4	11	18	34	−16	19

Source: A-Leagues
Rules for classification: 1) points; 2) goal difference; 3) goals scored; 4) wins; 5) head-to-head results; 5a) head-to-head points; 5b) head-to-head goal difference; 6) Fair Play points; 7) away goal difference; 8) away goals per match; 9) home goal difference; 10) home goals per match; 11) toss of a coin in an event of a tie of two clubs.

==== Matches ====
Win Draw Loss

2 November 2025 1	Canberra United	1–2	Newcastle Jets	Canberra
16:00 AEDT	Heyman 14'	Report	Lancaster 33'; Breier 89'	Stadium: McKellar Park; Attendance: 1,248; Referee: Georgia Ghirardello

16 November 2025 3	Wellington Phoenix	1–1	Newcastle Jets	Porirua
16:00 NZDT	Nunn 4'	Report	Ayres 23' (pen.)	Stadium: Porirua Park; Attendance: 1,292; Referee: Anna-Marie Keighley

22 November 2025 4	Newcastle Jets	1–0	Western Sydney Wanderers	Newcastle
15:00 AEDT	L. Allan 26'	Report		Stadium: No.2 Sportsground; Attendance: 1,413; Referee: Molly Godsell

7 December 2025 6	Central Coast Mariners	4–1	Newcastle Jets	Gosford
19:00 AEDT	Rasmussen 42', 71'; Levin 78'; Familton 83'	Report	L. Allan 22'	Stadium: polytec Stadium; Attendance: 328; Referee: Sophie Allum
Note: Match was postponed due to extreme heat.

13 December 2025 5	Newcastle Jets	3–0	Brisbane Roar	Newcastle
14:00 AEDT	Ayres 32'; Brown 45+1' (pen.); Breier 71'	Report		Stadium: No.2 Sportsground; Attendance: 1,166; Referee: Sophie Allum
Note: Due to significant player involvement in the international period, the match was postponed by two weeks.

19 December 2025 8	Newcastle Jets	1–3	Melbourne Victory	Newcastle
19:00 AEDT	L. Allan 81'	Report	White 25'; Pollicina 57'; Flannery 77'	Stadium: No.2 Sportsground; Attendance: 1,145; Referee: Mikayla Ryan

27 December 2025 9	Newcastle Jets	0–1	Canberra United	Newcastle
18:00 AEDT		Report	Dale 90+3'	Stadium: No.2 Sportsground; Attendance: 1,614; Referee: Molly Godsell

3 January 2026 11	Perth Glory	1–0	Newcastle Jets	Perth
18:00 AWST	Dalton 8'	Report		Stadium: Sam Ker Football Centre; Attendance: 948; Referee: Rebecca Durcau

10 January 2026 12	Newcastle Jets	1–2	Central Coast Mariners	Newcastle
19:00 AEDT	Brown 45+2'	Report	Trimis 53'; Rasmussen 70'	Stadium: No.2 Sportsground; Attendance: 1,261; Referee: Bec Mackie
Note: Due to an extreme heat forecast, the match's kick-off time was delayed by two hours.

13 January 2026 7	Sydney FC	1–2	Newcastle Jets	Sydney
19:00 AEDT	Cassar 18'	Report	Ayres 29'; Lancaster 90+1'	Stadium: Leichhardt Oval; Attendance: 1,642; Referee: Izzy Cooper

16 January 2026 13	Melbourne City	1–3	Newcastle Jets	Melbourne
16:50 AEDT	McNamara 41' (pen.)	Report	Brown 32'; Copus-Brown 66'; Lancaster 71'	Stadium: AAMI Park; Attendance: 1,909; Referee: Page Malau-Aduli

21 January 2026 10	Newcastle Jets	1–2	Adelaide United	Newcastle
21:00 AEDT	Davis 27'	Report	Healy 60'; Rossi 73'	Stadium: No.2 Sportsground; Attendance: 1,130; Referee: Mikayla Ryan

1 February 2026 15	Newcastle Jets	1–5	Wellington Phoenix	Newcastle
17:00 AEDT	Ayres 73'	Report	Vlok 10', 15', 64'; Pijnenburg 20'; Walker 24'	Stadium: No.2 Sportsground; Attendance: 1,102; Referee: Mikayla Ryan

7 February 2026 16	Melbourne Victory	2–1	Newcastle Jets	Melbourne
17:00 AEDT	Cicco 64' (o.g.); Furphy 82'	Report	Brown 74' (pen.)	Stadium: Home of the Matildas; Attendance: 871; Referee: Georgia Ghirardello

13 February 2026 17	Western Sydney Wanderers	1–1	Newcastle Jets	Sydney
16:50 AEDT	Younis 1'	Report	Ayres 78'	Stadium: CommBank Stadium; Attendance: 1,028; Referee: Shab Roshan

21 February 2026 18	Newcastle Jets	2–3	Perth Glory	Newcastle
17:00 AEDT	Dundas 16'; Ayres 61'	Report	Hollar 45'; Westaway 68'; McKenna 85'	Stadium: Newcastle Number 2 Sports Ground; Attendance: 1,152; Referee: Isabella Mossin

13 March 2026 19	Newcastle Jets	3–1	Sydney FC	Newcastle
19:00 AEDT	Ayres 22'; Hoban 31', 74'	Report	Hawkesby 15'	Stadium: No.2 Sportsground; Attendance: 897; Referee: Izzy Cooper

20 March 2026 20	Brisbane Roar	4–2	Newcastle Jets	Brisbane
17:00 AEST	Brown 47', 52', 62'; Jansen 69'	Report	Prior 73'; Hoban 90'	Stadium: Imperial Corp Stadium; Attendance: 1,363; Referee: Rebecca Durcau

28 March 2026 21	Adelaide United	1–3	Newcastle Jets	Adelaide
15:15 ACDT	I. Hodgson 41'	Report	Brown 23', 83'; J. Allan 55'	Stadium: ServiceFM Stadium; Attendance: 571; Referee: Georgia Ghirardello

5 April 2026 22	Newcastle Jets	1–2	Melbourne City	Maitland
18:00 AEDT	Ayres 47'	Report	Keane 72'; Turner 90+7'	Stadium: Maitland Sportsground; Attendance: 852; Referee: Mikayla Ryan

== Statistics ==
=== Appearances and goals ===
Includes all competitions. Players with no appearances not included in the list.

As of match played 5 April 2026

No.	Pos	Nat	Player	Total		A-League Women	
No.	Pos	Nat	Player	Apps	Goals	Apps	Goals
2	DF	(Australia) AUS	Josie Wilson	11	0	11	0
3	DF	(Australia) AUS	Claudia Cicco	19	0	19	0
4	DF	(Australia) AUS	Natasha Prior	20	1	20	1
5	DF	(New Zealand) NZL	Olivia Page	9	0	2+7	0
6	MF	(Australia) AUS	Cassidy Davis	9	1	8+1	1
7	FW	(Australia) AUS	India Breier	12	2	6+6	2
8	MF	(Australia) AUS	Emma Dundas	17	1	17	1
9	FW	(Australia) AUS	Haley Johnson	7	0	1+6	0
10	MF	(Australia) AUS	Libby Copus-Brown	19	1	16+3	1
11	MF	(New Zealand) NZL	Charlotte Lancaster	13	3	9+4	3
12	GK	(Australia) AUS	Georgia Ritchie	6	0	6	0
13	FW	(Australia) AUS	Lauren Allan	19	3	8+11	3
14	FW	(Australia) AUS	Melina Ayres	20	8	18+2	8
15	DF	(Australia) AUS	Emma Bates	12	0	11+1	0
18	MF	(Australia) AUS	Sophie Hoban	15	3	13+2	3
23	DF	(Australia) AUS	Zoe Karipidis	9	0	5+4	0
24	GK	(New Zealand) NZL	Anna Leat	12	0	12	0
26	FW	(Australia) AUS	Josie Allan	19	1	15+4	1
30	FW	(Australia) AUS	Alexis Collins	13	0	7+6	0
32	MF	(Australia) AUS	Claire Adams	9	0	3+6	0
44	FW	(New Zealand) NZL	Kelli Brown	19	6	11+8	6
50	GK	(Australia) AUS	Ally Boertje	2	0	2	0

=== Clean sheets ===
Includes all competitions. The list is sorted by squad number when total clean sheets are equal. Numbers in parentheses represent games where both goalkeepers participated and both kept a clean sheet; the number in parentheses is awarded to the goalkeeper who was substituted on, whilst a full clean sheet is awarded to the goalkeeper who was on the field at the start of play. Goalkeepers with no clean sheets not included in the list.

As of match played 5 April 2026

Rank	No.	Nat.	Goalkeeper	A-League Women	Total
1	24	(New Zealand)	Anna Leat	2	2

== See also ==
- 2025–26 Newcastle Jets FC season
