= 2026–27 Newcastle Jets FC (women) season =

19th season in existence of Newcastle Jets FC (women)

Newcastle Jets (A-League Women)
2026–27 season
- Head Coach: Stephen Hoyle
- Stadium: McDonald Jones Stadium; No.2 Sports Ground; Maitland Sports Ground; Hunter City Motor Group Stadium
- A-League Women: TBD
Home colours	Away colours	Third colours
- All statistics correct as of 29 July 2026.

The 2026–27 season is the Newcastle Jets Football Club (women)'s 19th season in the A-League Women.

== Players ==
=== First-team squad ===
As of 26 October 2026

Note: Flags indicate national team as defined under FIFA eligibility rules; some limited exceptions apply. Players may hold more than one non-FIFA nationality.

No.	Pos.	Nation	Player
1	GK	USA	Claire Henninger
4	DF	AUS	Natasha Prior
5	DF	AUS	Emma Bates
6	MF	AUS	Cassidy Davis (captain)
7	FW	AUS	Akeisha Sandhu
8	MF	AUS	Emma Dundas
10	MF	AUS	Libby Copus-Brown
11	FW	USA	Allie Thornton
12	GK	AUS	Georgia Ritchie
15	DF	AUS	Lillia Rae (scholarship)
16	MF	AUS	Mackenzie Preston-Poole (scholarship)
17	MF	USA	Alex Klos

No.	Pos.	Nation	Player
19	FW	AUS	Tamar Levin
20	MF	USA	Cameron Valladares
21	MF	AUS	Aaliyah Kilroy (scholarship)
22	DF	AUS	Poppie Hooks
23	DF	AUS	Zoe Karipidis
26	FW	AUS	Josie Allan
27	DF	AUS	Chloe Walandouw
30	FW	AUS	Alexis Collins
32	MF	AUS	Claire Adams
50	GK	AUS	Ally Boertje
—	FW	USA	Erin Flurey

== Transfers ==
=== Transfers in ===
No.	Position	Player	From	Type/fee	Contract length	Date	Ref
11	FW	(United States) Allie Thornton	(United States) Dallas Trinity	Free transfer	1 year	3 September 2026	
20	MF	(United States) Cameron Valladares	(United States) Arizona State Sun Devils	Free transfer	1 year	4 September 2026	
17	MF	(United States) Alex Klos	(United States) California Golden Bears	Free transfer	1 year	8 September 2026	
27	DF	Chloe Walandouw	(Australia) Northern Tigers	Free transfer	1 year	10 September 2026	
1	GK	(United States) Claire Henninger	(Portugal) Damaiense	Free transfer	1 year	21 September 2026	
7	FW	Akeisha Sandhu	(Australia) Essendon Royals	Free transfer	1 year	23 September 2026	
22	DF	Poppie Hooks	Unattached	Free transfer	1 year	25 September 2026	
19	FW	Tamar Levin	Central Coast Mariners	Free transfer	1 year	28 September 2026	
TBA	FW	(United States) Erin Flurey	Unattached	Free transfer	1 year	26 October 2026	

==== From academy squad ====
N	Pos.	Nat.	Name	Age	Notes
21	MF	(Australia)	Aaliyah Kilroy	17	scholarship contract
16	MF	(Australia)	Mackenzie Preston-Poole	16	1-year scholarship contract
15	DF	(Australia)	Lillia Rae	17	scholarship contract

=== Transfers out ===
No.	Position	Player	Transferred to	Type/fee	Date	Ref
3	DF	Claudia Cicco	Adelaide United	End of contract	24 July 2026	
2	DF	Josie Wilson	Unattached	End of contract	5 August 2026	
5	DF	(New Zealand) Olivia Page	Unattached	End of contract	5 August 2026	
7	FW	India Breier	Unattached	End of contract	5 August 2026	
9	FW	Haley Johnson	Unattached	End of contract	5 August 2026	
11	DF	(New Zealand) Charlotte Lancaster	Unattached	End of contract	5 August 2026	
14	FW	Melina Ayres	Unattached	End of contract	5 August 2026	
24	GK	(New Zealand) Anna Leat	Unattached	End of contract	5 August 2026	
44	FW	(New Zealand) Kelli Brown	Unattached	End of contract	5 August 2026	
18	MF	Sophie Hoban	(Portugal) Torreense	End of contract	22 August 2026	
13	FW	Lauren Allan	Retired		17 September 2026	

=== Contract extensions ===
No.	Player	Position	Duration	Date	Ref.
8	Emma Dundas	Midfielder	1 year	3 August 2026	
12	Georgia Ritchie	Goalkeeper	2 years	6 August 2026	
30	Alexis Collins	Forward	2 years	7 August 2026	
5	Emma Bates	Defender	2 years	10 August 2026	
32	Claire Adams	Midfielder	2 years	11 August 2026	
4	Natasha Prior	Defender	1 year	25 August 2026	
50	Ally Boertje	Goalkeeper	1 year	9 September 2026	
10	Libby Copus-Brown	Midfielder	1 year	16 September 2026	
23	Zoe Karipidis	Defender	1 year	18 September 2026	
6	Cassidy Davis	Midfielder	1 year	22 September 2026	

== Pre-season and friendlies ==
3 October 2026	Central Coast Mariners (Australia)	3–0	(Australia) Newcastle Jets	Gosford, Australia
	Halmarick; Kapetanellis; De Domizio	Report		Stadium: Central Coast Stadium; Attendance: 0 (behind closed doors)

== Competitions ==
=== Overall record ===
Competition	First match	Last match	Record							
Competition	First match	Last match	Pld	W	D	L	GF	GA	GD	Win %
A-League Women	TBD	TBD	0	0	0	0	0	0	+0	—
Total			0	0	0	0	0	0	+0	—

Last updated: 29 July 2026
Source: Competitions

=== A-League Women ===
==== League table ====
Pos	Team	Pld	W	D	L	GF	GA	GD	Pts
7	Canberra United	4	2	0	2	3	7	−4	6
8	Sydney FC	4	1	1	2	4	10	−6	4
9	Brisbane Roar	5	1	0	4	5	9	−4	3
10	Adelaide United	5	0	3	2	3	7	−4	3
11	Newcastle Jets	4	0	2	2	2	4	−2	2

Updated to match(es) played on 15 November 2026. Source: A-Leagues
Rules for classification: 1) points; 2) goal difference; 3) goals scored; 4) wins; 5) head-to-head results; 5a) head-to-head points; 5b) head-to-head goal difference; 6) Fair Play points; 7) away goal difference; 8) away goals per match; 9) home goal difference; 10) home goals per match; 11) toss of a coin in an event of a tie of two clubs.

==== Matches ====
The league fixtures were released on 21 August 2026.

Win Draw Loss Fixtures Postponed

17 October 2026 1	Newcastle Jets	0–1	Perth Glory	Weston
15:00 AEDT		Report	Badawiya 13' (pen.)	Stadium: Hunter City Motor Group Stadium; Referee: Caitlin Williams

1 November 2026 3	Melbourne Victory	1–0	Newcastle Jets	Melbourne
17:45 AEDT	Saveska 25'	Report		Stadium: AAMI Park

7 November 2026 4	Central Coast Mariners	1–1	Newcastle Jets	Gosford
15:00 AEDT	Halmarick 5'	Report	Levin 71'	Stadium: polytec Stadium

14 November 2026 5	Melbourne City	1–1	Newcastle Jets	Melbourne
15:00 AEDT	Vine 42'	Report	Prior 69'	Stadium: ctrl:cyber Pitch; Referee: Mikayla Ryan

TBD 6	Newcastle Jets	Postponed	Adelaide United	TBD
		Report		Stadium: TBD

11 December 2026 7	Western Sydney Wanderers	v	Newcastle Jets	Sydney
19:00 AEDT		Report		Stadium: Wanderers Football Park

19 December 2026 8	Canberra United	v	Newcastle Jets	Canberra
14:00 AEDT		Report		Stadium: McKellar Park

1 January 2027 10	Newcastle Jets	v	Wellington Phoenix	TBD
17:00 AEDT				Stadium: TBD

10 January 2027 11	Newcastle Jets	v	Melbourne City	TBD
17:00 AEST		Report		Stadium: TBD

15 January 2027 12	Sydney FC	–	Newcastle Jets	Sydney
16:50 AEDT		Report		Stadium: Allianz Stadium

24 January 2027 13	Newcastle Jets	v	Brisbane Roar	Maitland
17:00 AEDT		Report		Stadium: Maitland Sports Ground

30 January 2027 14	Perth Glory	v	Newcastle Jets	Perth
17:00 AWST		Report		Stadium: Sam Kerr Football Centre

7 February 2027 15	Newcastle Jets	v	Central Coast Mariners	Weston
15:00 AEDT		Report		Stadium: Hunter City Motor Group Stadium

14 February 2027 16	Newcastle Jets	–	Melbourne Victory	Weston
17:00 AEDT		Report		Stadium: Hunter City Motor Group Stadium

20 February 2027 17	Newcastle Jets	–	Canberra United	Weston
13:00 AEDT		Report		Stadium: Hunter City Motor Group Stadium

14 March 2027 18	Wellington Phoenix	v	Newcastle Jets	Porirua
15:00 NZDT				Stadium: Jerry Collins Stadium

20 March 2027 19	Newcastle Jets	–	Sydney FC	Newcastle
14:15 AEDT		Report		Stadium: McDonald Jones Stadium

28 March 2027 20	Newcastle Jets	v	Western Sydney Wanderers	Weston
15:00 AEDT		Report		Stadium: Hunter City Motor Group Stadium

2 April 2027 21	Adelaide United	v	Newcastle Jets	Adelaide
16:20 ACDT		Report		Stadium: Coopers Stadium

19 March 2027 22	Brisbane Roar	v	Newcastle Jets	Brisbane
17:00 AEST		Report		Stadium: Gioca Stadium

== See also ==
- 2026–27 Newcastle Jets FC season
