= 2024–25 Newcastle Jets FC (women) season =

17th season in existence of Newcastle Jets FC (women)

Newcastle Jets (A-League Women)
2024–25 season
- Head Coach: Ryan Campbell
- Stadium: McDonald Jones Stadium; No.2 Sports Ground; Maitland Sports Ground
- A-League Women: 11th
- Top goalscorer: Sheridan Gallagher; Deven Jackson (6 each)
- Highest home attendance: 2,858 vs. Western Sydney Wanderers (3 November 2024); A-League Women
- Lowest home attendance: 2,108 vs. Wellington Phoenix (17 November 2024); A-League Women
- Average home league attendance: 2,483
- Biggest win: 1–0 vs. Wellington Phoenix (H) (17 November 2024); A-League Women; 2–1 vs. Sydney FC (A) (14 December 2024); A-League Women
- Biggest defeat: 0–2 vs. Adelaide United (A) (8 December 2024); A-League Women
Home colours	Away colours	Third colours
- All statistics correct as of 14 December 2024.

The 2024–25 season was the Newcastle Jets Football Club (women)'s 17th season in the A-League Women.

== Players ==
=== First-team squad ===
As of 31 January 2025

Note: Flags indicate national team as defined under FIFA eligibility rules; some limited exceptions apply. Players may hold more than one non-FIFA nationality.

No.	Pos.	Nation	Player
1	GK	CAN	Danielle Krzyzaniak
2	DF	AUS	Josie Wilson
3	DF	AUS	Clauda Cicco
4	DF	AUS	Natasha Prior
6	MF	AUS	Cassidy Davis (captain)
7	FW	AUS	India Breier
8	MF	AUS	Emma Dundas
9	DF	AUS	Bel Rolley
10	MF	AUS	Libby Copus-Brown
11	FW	NZL	Deven Jackson
13	FW	AUS	Lauren Allan
17	FW	AUS	Sheridan Gallagher

No.	Pos.	Nation	Player
18	MF	AUS	Sophie Hoban
22	DF	SUI	Lorena Baumann
23	FW	USA	Gia Vicari
24	FW	AUS	Milan Hammond
25	MF	AUS	Lara Gooch
26	FW	AUS	Josie Allan (scholarship)
27	DF	AUS	Chloe Walandouw (scholarship)
30	GK	AUS	Tiahna Robertson
31	GK	AUS	Ally Boertje (scholarship)
32	MF	AUS	Claire Adams (scholarship)
39	FW	AUS	Alexis Collins (scholarship)
—	DF	AUS	Mia Green (scholarship)

== Transfers ==
=== Transfers in ===
No.	Position	Player	From	Type/fee	Contract length	Date	Ref
9	DF	Bel Rolley	Unattached	Free transfer	1 year	27 August 2024	
1	GK	(Canada) Danielle Krzyzaniak	Unattached	Free transfer	1 year	29 August 2024	
7	FW	India Breier	Western Sydney Wanderers	Free transfer	2 years	16 September 2024	
19	DF	Ava Piazza	Canberra United	Free transfer	2 years	17 September 2024	
–	DF	Mia Green	(Australia) Brisbane City	Free transfer	1 year (scholarship)	20 September 2024	
11	FW	(New Zealand) Deven Jackson	Canberra United	Free transfer	1 year	23 September 2024	
17	FW	Sheridan Gallagher	(Australia) Newcastle Knights (rugby league)	Free transfer	1 year	25 October 2024	
23	FW	(United States) Gia Vicari	(Denmark) Odense Boldklub Q	Free transfer	1 year	30 October 2024	
31	GK	Ally Boertje	Unattached	Scholarship	1 year	13 November 2024	

==== From academy squad ====
N	Pos.	Nat.	Name	Age	Notes
27	DF	(Australia)	Chloe Walandouw	18	1-year scholarship contract
32	MF	(Australia)	Claire Adams	18	1-year scholarship contract
39	FW	(Australia)	Alexis Collins	16	1-year scholarship contract

=== Transfers out ===
No.	Position	Player	Transferred to	Type/fee	Date	Ref
23	DF	Zoe Karipidis	(United States) Purdue Boilermakers	End of contract	9 April 2024	
7	DF	Gema Simon	Retired		7 May 2024	
15	DF	Alexandra Huynh	Retired		28 May 2024	
1	GK	(United States) Izzy Nino	(United States) Spokane Zephyr	End of contract	13 June 2024	
9	MF	MelindaJ Barbieri	Unattached	End of contract	28 July 2024	
21	GK	Kiara Rochaix	Unattached	End of contract	28 July 2024	
11	FW	(Philippines) Sarina Bolden	(Italy) Como	Mutual contract termination	26 August 2024	
14	FW	Melina Ayres	Unattached	Mutual contract termination	11 October 2024	
19	DF	Ava Piazza	(Portugal) Albergaria	Mutual contract termination	27 January 2025	

=== Contract extensions ===
No.	Player	Position	Duration	Date	Ref.
6	Cassidy Davis	Defensive midfielder	1 year	5 July 2024	
8	Emma Dundas	Midfielder	2 years	8 July 2024	
3	Claudia Cicco	Defender	2 years	9 July 2024	
11	(Philippines) Sarina Bolden	Forward	1 year	9 July 2024	
14	Melina Ayres	Forward	1 year	9 July 2024	
18	Sophie Hoban	Midfielder	2 years	17 July 2024	
4	Natasha Prior	Defender	2 years	25 July 2024	
24	Milan Hammond	Forward	1 year (with automatic extension option)	28 July 2024	
10	Libby Copus-Brown	Midfielder	2 years	29 August 2024	
30	Tiahna Robertson	Goalkeeper	1 year	3 September 2024	
22	(Switzerland) Lorena Baumann	Defender	1 year	4 September 2024	
2	Josie Wilson	Defender	1 year	13 September 2024	
26	Josie Allan	Forward	1 year (scholarship)	19 September 2024	
25	Lara Gooch	Midfielder	1 year	24 September 2024	

== Pre-season and friendlies ==
5 October 2024	Western Sydney Wanderers (Australia)	1–1	(Australia) Newcastle Jets	Sydney, Australia
16:00 AEST	Harding	Report	Hammond	Stadium: Wanderers Football Park
Note: Match consisted of 3 45-minute parts

13 October 2024	Newcastle Jets (Australia)	0–2	(Australia) Central Coast Mariners	Cessnock, Australia
14:00 AEST		Report	Nunn; Trimis	Stadium: Cessnock Sportsground

== Competitions ==
=== Overall record ===
Competition	First match	Last match	Final position	Record							
Competition	First match	Last match	Final position	Pld	W	D	L	GF	GA	GD	Win %
A-League Women	3 November 2024	19 April 2025	11th	23	5	5	13	29	53	−24	21.74
Total				23	5	5	13	29	53	−24	21.74

Last updated: 19 April 2025
Source: Competitions

=== A-League Women ===
==== League table ====
Pos	Team	Pld	W	D	L	GF	GA	GD	Pts
8	Sydney FC	23	7	4	12	23	29	−6	25
9	Wellington Phoenix (Note: Wellington Phoenix cannot qualify for the AFC Women's Champions League as they are based in New Zealand, which is part of the Oceania Football Confederation.)	23	7	3	13	25	30	−5	24
10	Perth Glory	23	6	4	13	27	43	−16	22
11	Newcastle Jets	23	5	5	13	29	53	−24	20
12	Western Sydney Wanderers	23	4	4	15	28	46	−18	16

Source: A-Leagues
Rules for classification: 1) points; 2) goal difference; 3) goals scored; 4) wins; 5) head-to-head results; 5a) head-to-head points; 5b) head-to-head goal difference; 6) Fair Play points; 7) away goal difference; 8) away goals per match; 9) home goal difference; 10) home goals per match; 11) toss of a coin in an event of a tie of two clubs.

==== Results summary ====
Overall								Home						Away					
Pld	W	D	L	GF	GA	GD	Pts	W	D	L	GF	GA	GD	W	D	L	GF	GA	GD
23	5	5	13	29	53	−24	20	3	4	5	14	23	−9	2	1	8	15	30	−15

Last updated: 19 April 2025.
Source: Soccerway
Home figures include Newcastle Jets' 1–1 draw on neutral ground in Unite Round against Western United on 23 November 2024.

==== Results by round ====
Round	1	2	3	4	5	6	7	8	10	9	11	12	13	14	15	16	17	18	19	20	21	22	23
Ground	H	A	H	N	A	A	H	A	A	H	H	A	H	A	H	A	H	H	A	A	H	A	H
Result	D	L	W	D	L	W	L	D	L	D	L	L	D	L	L	L	W	W	W	L	L	L	L
Position	7	9	7	7	9	6	9	8	9	9	9	9	10	10	10	11	11	10	9	10	11	11	11
Points	1	1	4	5	5	8	8	9	9	10	10	10	11	11	11	11	14	17	20	20	20	20	20

Updated to match(es) played on 20 April 2025. Source: Soccerway
A = Away; H = Home; N = Neutral; W = Win; D = Draw; L = Loss

==== Matches ====
Win Draw Loss

All times are in local time (AEST/AEDT).

3 November 2024 1	Newcastle Jets	2–2	Western Sydney Wanderers	Cessnock
16:00	Jackson 45+4'; L. Allan 61'	Report	Harding 4'; Saveska 27'	Stadium: Cessnock Sportsground (Note: Originally the match was scheduled to take place at No.2 Sportsground, but the venue was changed due to the ground being unavailable.); Attendance: 2,858; Referee: Bec Mackie

10 November 2024 2	Perth Glory	3–2	Newcastle Jets	Perth
18:00	Cassidy 1'; O'Donoghue 50'; Brown 65'	Report	J. Allan 13'; Gallagher 90+3'	Stadium: HBF Park; Attendance: 1,873; Referee: Isabella Mossin

17 November 2024 3	Newcastle Jets	1–0	Wellington Phoenix	Maitland
15:00	Davis 70'	Report		Stadium: Maitland Regional Sportsground (Note: Originally the match was scheduled to take place at No.2 Sportsground, but the venue was changed because the playing surface was not up to standard.); Attendance: 2,108; Referee: Bec Mackie

23 November 2024 4	Newcastle Jets	1–1	Western United	Sydney
17:00	Cicco 71'	Report	Maher 80'	Stadium: Netstrata Jubilee Stadium (Note: Match moved from Leichhardt Oval following a pitch assessment.); Attendance: 1,494; Referee: Rebecca Durcau

8 December 2024 5	Adelaide United	2–0	Newcastle Jets	Adelaide
17:30	Worts 44', 63'	Report		Stadium: Marden Sports Complex; Attendance: 1,019; Referee: Beth Rattray

15 December 2024 6	Sydney FC	1–2	Newcastle Jets	Sydney
17:00	dos Santos 22'	Report	Jackson 86'; L. Allan 90+5'	Stadium: Allianz Stadium; Attendance: 3,533; Referee: Caitlin Williams

21 December 2024 7	Newcastle Jets	1–6	Brisbane Roar	Maitland
17:00	Davis 32'	Report	Kuilamu 2'; Levin 34'; L. Freier 42', 69', 72'; Hayashi 49'	Stadium: Maitland Regional Sportsground; Attendance: 1,616; Referee: Georgia Ghirardello

29 December 2024 8	Canberra United	0–0	Newcastle Jets	Canberra
17:00		Report		Stadium: McKellar Park; Attendance: 1,188; Referee: Molly Godsell

3 January 2025 10	Western United	2–0	Newcastle Jets	Melbourne
19:00	Johnson 59', 78'	Report		Stadium: Ironbark Fields; Attendance: 531; Referee: Beth Rattray

8 January 2025 9	Newcastle Jets	3–3	Adelaide United	Newcastle
17:30	J. Allan 75'; Jackson 84'; Adams 90+3'	Report	Worts 4'; Condon 74'; León 78'	Stadium: No.2 Sportsground (Note: Originally the match was scheduled to take place at Maitland Regional Sportsground, but the venue was changed after consideration by the club and Maitland City Council.); Attendance: 923; Referee: Kelly Jones

11 January 2025 11	Newcastle Jets	0–2	Melbourne Victory	Newcastle
17:00		Report	Gielnik 18'; Lowe 43'	Stadium: No.2 Sportsground; Attendance: 1,753; Referee: Mikayla Ryan

19 January 2025 12	Wellington Phoenix	3–2	Newcastle Jets	Wellington
14:00	Elliott 50', 90+8'; Longo 59'	Report	Gallagher 3', 43'	Stadium: Porirua Park; Attendance: 915; Referee: Sarah Jones

25 January 2025 13	Newcastle Jets	2–2	Canberra United	Newcastle
19:45	Gooch 10'; Gallagher 71'	Report	Wilson 24' (o.g.); Heyman 29'	Stadium: McDonald Jones Stadium; Attendance: 3,264; Referee: Caitlin Williams

1 February 2025 14	Central Coast Mariners	5–1	Newcastle Jets	Gosford
16:50	Nunn 8'; Galic 33'; Fuller 49'; Pennock 53'; Trimis 90+3'	Report	J. Allan 30'	Stadium: Industree Group Stadium; Attendance: 3,742; Referee: Bec Mackie

8 February 2025 15	Newcastle Jets	0–2	Melbourne City	Newcastle
19:45		Report	Hughes 69'; McNamara 85'	Stadium: McDonald Jones Stadium; Attendance: 2,583; Referee: Molly Godsell

14 February 2025 16	Western Sydney Wanderers	4–1	Newcastle Jets	Sydney
19:00	Trew 28'; Harada 39'; Harrison 74' (pen.); Caspers 88'	Report	Prior 7'	Stadium: Wanderers Football Park; Attendance: 925; Referee: Kelly Jones

1 March 2025 17	Newcastle Jets	2–1	Perth Glory	Newcastle
17:00	Hoban 2', 3'	Report	Lincoln 56'	Stadium: No.2 Sportsground; Attendance: 1,048; Referee: Rebecca Durcau

8 March 2025 18	Newcastle Jets	1–0	Sydney FC	Newcastle
17:00	Gallagher 42'	Report		Stadium: No.2 Sportsground; Attendance: 1,127; Referee: Molly Godsell

16 March 2025 19	Brisbane Roar	2–3	Newcastle Jets	Brisbane
18:30	Yallop 7', 19'	Report	Dundas 17'; Jackson 49'; L. Allan 90+5'	Stadium: Perry Park; Attendance: 2,548; Referee: Isabella Mossin

21 March 2025 20	Melbourne Victory	4–3	Newcastle Jets	Melbourne
19:00	Gielnik 1', 11'; Jancevski 22'; Morrison 90+6'	Report	L. Allan 43'; Hoban 45'; Gallagher 90+2'	Stadium: The Home of the Matildas; Attendance: 632; Referee: Molly Godsell

30 March 2025 21	Newcastle Jets	0–2	Western United	Newcastle
17:00		Report	Zimmerman 50'; Hieda 77'	Stadium: No.2 Sportsground; Attendance: 1,260; Referee: Rachael Mitchenson

11 April 2025 22	Melbourne City	4–1	Newcastle Jets	Melbourne
16:50	McNamara 20', 33'; Pollicina 69'; Henry 71'	Report	Jackson 67'	Stadium: AAMI Park; Attendance: 2,257; Referee: Caitlin Williams

19 April 2025 23	Newcastle Jets	1–2	Central Coast Mariners	Maitland
16:00	Jackson 57'	Report	Fuller 78'; Pennock 83'	Stadium: Maitland Regional Sportsground; Attendance: 1,479; Referee: Mikayla Ryan

== Statistics ==
=== Appearances and goals ===
Includes all competitions. Players with no appearances not included in the list.

As of match played 19 April 2025

No.	Pos	Nat	Player	Total		A-League Women	
No.	Pos	Nat	Player	Apps	Goals	Apps	Goals
1	GK	(Canada) CAN	Danielle Krzyzaniak	16	0	16	0
2	DF	(Australia) AUS	Josie Wilson	21	0	17+4	0
3	DF	(Australia) AUS	Claudia Cicco	21	1	21	1
4	DF	(Australia) AUS	Natasha Prior	16	1	16	1
6	MF	(Australia) AUS	Cassidy Davis	23	2	23	2
7	MF	(Australia) AUS	India Breier	13	0	6+7	0
8	MF	(Australia) AUS	Emma Dundas	21	1	18+3	1
9	DF	(Australia) AUS	Bel Rolley	5	0	0+5	0
10	MF	(Australia) AUS	Libby Copus-Brown	21	0	18+3	0
11	MF	(New Zealand) NZL	Deven Jackson	18	6	17+1	6
13	FW	(Australia) AUS	Lauren Allan	21	4	17+4	4
17	FW	(Australia) AUS	Sheridan Gallagher	19	6	14+5	6
18	MF	(Australia) AUS	Sophie Hoban	22	3	21+1	3
22	DF	(Switzerland) SUI	Lorena Baumann	22	0	22	0
23	FW	(United States) USA	Gia Vicari	4	0	0+4	0
24	FW	(Australia) AUS	Milan Hammond	8	0	0+8	0
25	MF	(Australia) AUS	Lara Gooch	10	1	2+8	1
26	MF	(Australia) AUS	Josie Allan	15	3	10+5	3
27	DF	(Australia) AUS	Chloe Walandouw	5	0	3+2	0
30	GK	(Australia) AUS	Tiahna Robertson	9	0	7+2	0
32	MF	(Australia) AUS	Claire Adams	16	1	2+14	1
39	DF	(Australia) AUS	Alexis Collins	8	0	3+5	0

=== Disciplinary record ===
Includes all competitions. The list is sorted by squad number when total cards are equal. Players with no cards not included in the list.

As of match played 14 December 2024

Rank	No.	Pos.	Nat.	Name	A-League Women			Total							
Rank	No.	Pos.	Nat.	Name	Yellow card	(yellow card) (yellow-red card)	Red card	Yellow card	(yellow card) (yellow-red card)	Red card					
Rank	No.	Pos.	Nat.	Name	1	1	GK	(Canada)	Danielle Krzyzaniak	1	0	2	1	0	2
2	17	FW	(Australia)	Sheridan Gallagher	3	0	0	3	0	0					
3	10	MF	(Australia)	Libby Copus-Brown	2	0	0	2	0	0					
Total					6	0	2	6	0	2					

=== Clean sheets ===
Includes all competitions. The list is sorted by squad number when total clean sheets are equal. Numbers in parentheses represent games where both goalkeepers participated and both kept a clean sheet; the number in parentheses is awarded to the goalkeeper who was substituted on, whilst a full clean sheet is awarded to the goalkeeper who was on the field at the start of play. Goalkeepers with no clean sheets not included in the list.

As of match played 19 April 2025

Rank	No.	Nat.	Goalkeeper	A-League Women	Total
1	30	(Australia)	Tiahna Robertson	2	2
2	1	(Canada)	Danielle Krzyzaniak	1	1
Total				3	3

== See also ==
- 2024–25 Newcastle Jets FC season
