= 2023–24 Newcastle Jets FC (women) season =

16th season in existence of Newcastle Jets FC (women)

Newcastle Jets (A-League Women)
2023–24 season
- Manager: Gary van Egmond (until 15 January 2024); Ryan Campbell (from 15 January 2024)
- Stadium: McDonald Jones Stadium; Newcastle Number 2 Sports Ground; Maitland Sportsground
- A-League Women: 6th
- A-League Women Finals: Semi-finals
- Top goalscorer: League: Sarina Bolden (12); All: Sarina Bolden (14)
- Highest home attendance: 6,836 vs. Melbourne City (21 April 2024); A-League Women Finals
- Lowest home attendance: 1,634 vs. Wellington Phoenix (4 February 2024); A-League Women
- Average home league attendance: 2,417
- Biggest win: 8–0 vs. Adelaide United (A) (29 March 2024); A-League Women
- Biggest defeat: 0–4 vs. Melbourne Victory (A) (12 November 2023); A-League Women

The 2023–24 season was the 16th in the history of Newcastle Jets Football Club (A-League Women).

== Players ==
=== First-team squad ===
As of 28 March 2024

Note: Flags indicate national team as defined under FIFA eligibility rules; some limited exceptions apply. Players may hold more than one non-FIFA nationality.

No.	Pos.	Nation	Player
1	GK	USA	Izzy Nino
2	DF	AUS	Josie Wilson
3	DF	AUS	Clauda Cicco
4	DF	AUS	Natasha Prior
6	MF	AUS	Cassidy Davis (captain)
7	DF	AUS	Gema Simon
9	MF	AUS	MelindaJ Barbieri
10	MF	AUS	Libby Copus-Brown
11	FW	PHI	Sarina Bolden
13	FW	AUS	Lauren Allan
14	FW	AUS	Melina Ayres

No.	Pos.	Nation	Player
15	DF	AUS	Alexandra Huynh
18	DF	AUS	Sophie Hoban
21	GK	AUS	Kiara Rochaix
22	DF	SUI	Lorena Baumann
23	DF	AUS	Zoe Karapidis
24	FW	AUS	Milan Hammond (scholarship)
25	MF	AUS	Lara Gooch (scholarship)
26	FW	AUS	Josie Allan (scholarship)
28	MF	AUS	Emma Dundas
30	GK	AUS	Tiahna Robertson (injury replacement)

== Transfers ==
=== Transfers in ===
No.	Position	Player	Transferred from	Type/fee	Contract length	Date	Ref.
3	DF	Claudia Cicco	Wellington Phoenix	Free transfer	1 year	28 July 2023	
18	DF	Sophie Hoban	(Australia) APIA Leichhardt	Free transfer	1 year	4 August 2023	
8	MF	(New Zealand) Rebecca Burrows	Unattached	Free transfer	1 year	10 August 2023	
15	DF	Alexandra Huynh	(Australia) Macarthur Rams	Free transfer	1 year	15 August 2023	
14	FW	Melina Ayres	Melbourne Victory	Free transfer	1 year	24 August 2023	
21	GK	Kiara Rochaix	(Australia) Blacktown City	Free transfer	1 year	30 August 2023	
22	DF	(Switzerland) Lorena Baumann	Unattached	Free transfer	1 year	31 August 2023	
7	DF	Gema Simon	Unattached	Free transfer	1 year	1 September 2023	
34	DF	(United States) Maggie Shaw	Unattached	Free transfer	1 year	4 September 2023	
1	GK	(United States) Izzy Nino	(United States) Michigan Wolverines	Free transfer	1 year	5 September 2023	
10	MF	Libby Copus-Brown	(England) Lewes	Free transfer	1 year	7 September 2023	
2	DF	Josie Wilson	(Australia) Northern Tigers	Free transfer	1 year	16 September 2023	
24	FW	Milan Hammond	Perth Glory	Scholarship	1 year	20 September 2023	
4	DF	Natasha Prior	(Australia) APIA Leichhardt	Free transfer	1 year	30 September 2023	
19	FW	Bonnie Davies	(Australia) Peninsula Power	Free transfer	1 year	9 October 2023	
9	MF	MelindaJ Barbieri	Unattached	Free transfer	1 year	9 October 2023	
11	MF	(Democratic Republic of the Congo) Exaucée Kizinga	Unattached	Free transfer	8 months	8 November 2023	
5	MF	Emily van Egmond	(United States) San Diego Wave	Guest player	4 games	17 November 2023	
11	FW	(Philippines) Sarina Bolden	Unattached	Free transfer	7 months	26 November 2023	
30	GK	Tiahna Robertson	(Australia) UNSW	Injury replacement		28 March 2024	

==== From academy squad ====
N	Pos.	Nat.	Name	Age	Notes
28	MF	(Australia)	Emma Dundas		Scholarship contract
23	DF	(Australia)	Zoe Karapidis	16	Scholarship contract

=== Transfers out ===
No.	Position	Player	Transferred to	Type/fee	Date	Ref.
20	GK	Claire Coelho	Retired		23 March 2023	
9	FW	Tara Andrews	Retired		24 March 2023	
23	DF	Teigen Allen	Retired		31 March 2023	
24	MF	Josie Morley	(Australia) Adamstown Rosebud	End of contract	3 April 2023	
5	DF	Leia Puxty	(Australia) Adamstown Rosebud	End of contract	3 April 2023	
10	FW	Sophie Stapleford	(Australia) Maitland FC	End of contract	3 April 2023	
11	DF	Tessa Tamplin	Unattached	End of contract	3 April 2023	
27	FW	Renée Pountney	(Australia) Gladesville Ravens	End of contract	11 May 2023	
2	MF	Emily Roach	(Australia) Blacktown Spartans	End of contract	13 May 2023	
7	DF	Chloe Walandouw	Unattached	End of contract	30 June 2023	
1	GK	Georgina Worth	Retired		11 July 2023	
3	DF	(United States) Emily Garnier	Retired		24 July 2023	
12	FW	(United States) Murphy Agnew	(Scotland) Celtic	End of contract	26 July 2023	
14	DF	Lucy Johnson	Sydney FC	Free transfer	10 August 2023	
18	MF	Taren King	Central Coast Mariners	Free transfer	17 August 2023	
19	FW	Ashlee Brodigan	Brisbane Roar	Free transfer	25 August 2023	
22	DF	(United States) Cannon Clough	Newcastle Jets	Free transfer	18 September 2023	
34	DF	(United States) Maggie Shaw	Unattached	Mutual contract termination	9 October 2023	
11	MF	(Democratic Republic of the Congo) Exaucée Kizinga	Unattached	Mutual contract termination	26 November 2023	
19	MF	Bonnie Davies	Brisbane Roar	Mutual contract termination	16 December 2023	
5	MF	Emily van Egmond	Unattached	End of contract	17 December 2023	
8	MF	(New Zealand) Rebecca Burrows	(China) Hainan Qiongzhong	Mutual contract termination	27 December 2023	

=== Contract extensions ===
No.	Position	Player	Duration	Date	Ref.
13	Lauren Allan	Forward	2 years	26 July 2023	
25	Lara Gooch	Midfielder	1 year	26 July 2023	
6	Cassidy Davis	Midfielder	1 year	18 August 2023	
26	Josie Allan	Forward	1 year	20 September 2023	
23	Zoe Karapidis	Defender	5 months	10 January 2024	Signed a new full senior contract until the end of the 2023–24 season, replacing her scholarship contract.
28	Emma Dundas	Midfielder	5 months	10 January 2024	Signed a new full senior contract until the end of the 2023–24 season, replacing her scholarship contract.

== Pre-season and friendlies ==
23 September 2023 Greater Bank Tour	Newcastle Jets (Australia)	v	(Australia) Northern NSW Select	Tamworth
15:00		Source		Stadium: Scully Park

24 September 2023	Newcastle Jets (Australia)	2–3	(Australia) Central Coast Mariners	Tamworth
11:00 AEST	Hammond 69'; Haban 72'	Report	Badawiya 16'; Wardlow 64'; Rasmussen 80'	Stadium: Scully Park

28 September 2023	Sydney FC (Australia)	2–0	(Australia) Newcastle Jets	Sydney
	Ray 18'; Johnson 44'	Report		Stadium: Sky Park; Attendance: 0 (behind closed doors)

3 October 2023	Newcastle Jets (Australia)	1–2	(New Zealand) Wellington Phoenix	Lisarow
15:00 AEDT	Goal	Report	Taylor (pen.); Wisnewski	Stadium: Pluim Park

== Competitions ==
=== Overall record ===
Competition	First match	Last match	Starting round	Final position	Record							
Competition	First match	Last match	Starting round	Final position	Pld	W	D	L	GF	GA	GD	Win %
A-League Women	14 October 2023	31 March 2024	Matchday 1	6th	22	10	3	9	43	36	+7	45.45
A-League Women Finals	13 April 2024	28 April 2024	Elimination-finals	Semi-finals	3	1	0	2	4	8	−4	33.33
Total					25	11	3	11	47	44	+3	44.00

Source: Soccerway

=== A-League Women ===
==== League table ====
Pos	Team	Pld	W	D	L	GF	GA	GD	Pts	Qualification
4	Melbourne Victory	22	10	6	6	44	29	+15	36	Qualification to Finals series
5	Central Coast Mariners	22	10	5	7	31	24	+7	35	Qualification to Finals series
6	Newcastle Jets	22	10	3	9	43	36	+7	33	Qualification to Finals series
7	Western Sydney Wanderers	22	10	3	9	30	30	0	33	
8	Wellington Phoenix (Note: Wellington Phoenix cannot qualify for Asian Football Confederation competitions as they are based in New Zealand, which is under the Oceania Football Confederation.)	22	9	1	12	36	33	+3	28	

Source: A-Leagues
Rules for classification: 1) points; 2) wins; 3) goal difference; 4) goals scored; 5) head-to-head results; 6) Fair Play points; 7) away head-to-head results; 8) home head-to-head results; 9) toss of a coin

==== Results summary ====
Overall								Home						Away					
Pld	W	D	L	GF	GA	GD	Pts	W	D	L	GF	GA	GD	W	D	L	GF	GA	GD
21	9	3	9	41	35	+6	30	5	3	3	23	18	+5	4	0	6	18	17	+1

Source: KEEPUP

==== Results by round ====
Round	1	2	3	4	5	6	7	8	9	10	11	12	13	14	15	16	17	18	19	20	21	22
Ground	A	A	H	A	H	A	H	H	A	H	H	N	A	H	H	A	H	H	A	A	H	A
Result	W	L	D	L	L	W	L	W	L	W	D	W	L	L	W	L	W	D	L	W	W	W
Position	5	7	5	8	9	7	10	6	8	7	8	6	8	9	8	8	6	6	6	7	7	6
Points	3	3	4	4	4	7	7	10	10	13	14	17	17	17	20	20	23	24	24	27	30	33

Source: KEEPUP
A = Away; H = Home; N = Neutral; W = Win; D = Draw; L = Loss

==== Matches ====
Win Draw Loss

14 October 2023 1	Central Coast Mariners	0–1	Newcastle Jets	Gosford
17:00 AEDT		Report	Ayres 81'	Stadium: Industree Group Stadium; Attendance: 5,735; Referee: Kate Jacewicz

22 October 2023 2	Perth Glory	1–0	Newcastle Jets	Perth
14:00 AWST	Phonsongkham 50'	Report		Stadium: HBF Park; Attendance: 1,450; Referee: Bec Mackie

5 November 2023 3	Newcastle Jets	1–1	Western Sydney Wanderers	Newcastle
17:45 AEDT	Davis 90+2'	Report	Bruce 79'	Stadium: McDonald Jones Stadium; Attendance: 2,422; Referee: Caitlin Williams

12 November 2023 4	Melbourne Victory	4–0	Newcastle Jets	Melbourne
15:00 AEDT	Lowe 2', 65'; O'Grady 66'; Burrows 88' (o.g.)	Report		Stadium: The Home of the Matildas; Attendance: 1,796; Referee: Anna-Marie Keighley

19 November 2023 5	Newcastle Jets	2–3	Melbourne City	Newcastle
16:00 AEDT	van Egmond 14'; Gooch 32'	Report	Galic 8'; McNamara 78', 90+2'	Stadium: Newcastle Number 2 Sports Ground; Attendance: 3,207; Referee: Asaka Koizumi

26 November 2023 6	Canberra United	3–4	Newcastle Jets	Canberra
16:00 AEDT	Heyman 2'; Milivojević 58', 90'	Report	Bolden 5', 61'; van Egmond 13'; Allan 81'	Stadium: McKellar Park; Attendance: 1,853; Referee: Rebecca Durcau

10 December 2023 7	Newcastle Jets	0–1	Sydney FC	Newcastle
16:00 AEDT		Report	Vine 84'	Stadium: Newcastle Number 2 Sports Ground; Attendance: 3,842; Referee: Bec Mackie

17 December 2023 8	Newcastle Jets	4–2	Western United	Newcastle
17:00 AEDT	Allan 25', 74'; van Egmond 62'; Bolden 69'	Report	Logarzo 54' (pen.); Papadopoulos 64'	Stadium: Newcastle Number 2 Sports Ground; Attendance: 2,023; Referee: Isabella Libri

23 December 2023 9	Wellington Phoenix	2–0	Newcastle Jets	Wellington
14:45 NZDT	Speckmaier 34' (pen.); Breslin 39'	Report		Stadium: Sky Stadium; Attendance: 2,614; Referee: Mikayla Ryan

31 December 2023 10	Newcastle Jets	3–1	Adelaide United	Newcastle
17:00 AEDT	Copus-Brown 15'; Prior 20'; Bolden 49'	Report	Holmes 10'	Stadium: Newcastle Number 2 Sports Ground; Attendance: 1,763; Referee: Caitlin Williams

6 January 2024 11	Newcastle Jets	3–3	Canberra United	Newcastle
17:00 AEDT	Bolden 16'; Gooch 51'; Barbieri 72'	Report	Flannery 23'; Jackson 31'; Clark 84'	Stadium: Newcastle Number 2 Sports Ground; Attendance: 2,112; Referee: Bec Mackie

13 January 2024 12	Brisbane Roar	1–2	Newcastle Jets	Sydney
19:45 AEDT	Corbin 65'	Report	Bolden 63'; Yallop 77' (o.g.)	Stadium: Leichhardt Oval; Attendance: 1,417; Referee: Isabella Libri
Note: Originally scheduled for 14 January 2024, was moved due to Unite Round.

21 January 2024 13	Sydney FC	2–1	Newcastle Jets	Sydney
18:00 AEDT	Caspers 53'; Kruger 90+6'	Report	Bolden 16'	Stadium: Leichhardt Oval; Attendance: 2,547; Referee: Caitlin Williams

28 January 2024 14	Newcastle Jets	0–2	Central Coast Mariners	Newcastle
17:00 AEDT		Report	Wurigumula 4'; Hayward 72'	Stadium: Newcastle Number 2 Sports Ground; Attendance: 3,023; Referee: Bec Mackie

4 February 2024 15	Newcastle Jets	3–2	Wellington Phoenix	Newcastle
17:00 AEDT	Karpidis 33'; Copus-Brown 50'; Bolden 65'	Report	Maier 4'; Cox 56'	Stadium: No.2 Sportsground; Attendance: 1,634; Referee: Caitlin Williams

9 February 2024 16	Western Sydney Wanderers	2–1	Newcastle Jets	Bathurst
19:00 AEDT	Harding 43'; Bruce 79'	Report	Copus-Brown 14'	Stadium: Carrington Park; Attendance: 3,873; Referee: Isabella Mossin

17 February 2024 17	Newcastle Jets	3–0	Brisbane Roar	Maitland
17:00 AEDT	Bolden 39', 77', 78'	Report		Stadium: Maitland Sportsground; Attendance: 1,938; Referee: Beth Rattray

3 March 2024 18	Newcastle Jets	1–1	Perth Glory	Maitland
16:00 AEDT	Barbieri 77'	Report	Prior 2' (o.g.)	Stadium: Maitland Sportsground; Attendance: 1,727; Referee: Isabella Mossin

10 March 2024 19	Melbourne City	2–0	Newcastle Jets	Melbourne
18:00 AEDT	Wilkinson 50', 56'	Report		Stadium: City Football Academy; Attendance: 375; Referee: Caitlin Williams
Note: Match originally scheduled for 17:00 AEST, but delayed due to extreme heat forecast. It was rescheduled for 17:30 AEDT, then 18:00 AEDT.

17 March 2024 20	Western United	1–3	Newcastle Jets	Melbourne
16:00 AEDT	Medwin 20'	Report	Copus-Brown 4'; Allan 21'; Bolden 66'	Stadium: Wyndham Regional Football Facility; Attendance: 2,040; Referee: Georgia Ghirardello

23 March 2024 21	Newcastle Jets	3–2	Melbourne Victory	Newcastle
16:00 AEDT	Allan 40'; Ayres 80', 87'	Report	Lowe 14'; Hansen 53'	Stadium: Newcastle Number 2 Sports Ground; Attendance: 2,892; Referee: Rebecca Durcau

29 March 2024 22	Adelaide United	0–8	Newcastle Jets	Adelaide
15:30 ACDT		Report	Davis 27'; Gooch 42', 47'; Allan 47'; Dundas 57'; Ayres 62', 70'; Huynh 90+1'	Stadium: Coopers Stadium; Referee: Bec Mackie

==== Finals series ====
13 April 2024 Elimination-finals	Western United	2–4 (a.e.t.)	Newcastle Jets	Melbourne
18:30 AEST	Cerne 22'; Zimmerman 68' (pen.)	Report	Bolden 11', 45+1' (pen.); Ayres 101'; Hoban 113'	Stadium: Wyndham Regional Football Facility; Attendance: 3,370; Referee: Georgia Ghirardello

21 April 2024 Semi-finals 1st Leg	Newcastle Jets	0–3	Melbourne City	Maitland
15:00 AEST		Report	Galic 5'; Ekic 61'; McMahon 77'	Stadium: Maitland Sportsground; Attendance: 6,836; Referee: Bec Mackie

28 April 2024 Semi-finals 2nd Leg	Melbourne City	3–0 (6–0 agg.)	Newcastle Jets	Melbourne
13:00 AEST	Pollicina 26'; Wilkinson 67'; McKenna 70'	Report		Stadium: AAMI Park; Attendance: 2,041; Referee: Rebecca Durcau

== Statistics ==
=== Appearances and goals ===
Includes all competitions. Players with no appearances not included in the list.

No.	Pos.	Nat.	Name	A-League Women				Total	
No.	Pos.	Nat.	Name	Regular season		Finals series		Total	
No.	Pos.	Nat.	Name	Apps	Goals	Apps	Goals	Apps	Goals
1	GK	(United States)	Isobel Nino	21	0	1	0	22	0
2	DF	(Australia)	Josie Wilson	6+9	0	3	0	18	0
3	DF	(Australia)	Claudia Cicco	17+1	0	0	0	18	0
4	DF	(Australia)	Natasha Prior	20+1	1	3	0	24	1
5	MF	(Australia)	Emily van Egmond	4	3	0	0	4	3
6	MF	(Australia)	Cassidy Davis	21	2	3	0	24	2
7	DF	(Australia)	Gema Simon	0+4	0	0	0	4	0
8	MF	(New Zealand)	Rebecca Burrows	2+2	0	0	0	4	0
9	MF	(Australia)	MelindaJ Barbieri	16+4	2	3	0	23	2
10	MF	(Australia)	Libby Copus-Brown	19+2	3	3	0	24	3
11	MF	(Philippines)	Sarina Bolden	17	12	3	2	20	14
13	FW	(Australia)	Lauren Allan	22	5	3	0	25	5
14	FW	(Australia)	Melina Ayres	4+7	5	1+2	1	14	6
15	DF	(Australia)	Alexandra Huynh	3+7	1	0+3	0	13	1
18	MF	(Australia)	Sophie Hoban	14+6	0	1+2	1	23	1
22	DF	(Switzerland)	Lorena Baumann	20+2	0	3	0	25	0
23	DF	(Australia)	Zoe Karipidis	11+3	1	0	0	14	1
24	FW	(Australia)	Milan Hammond	0+11	0	1+2	0	14	0
25	MF	(Australia)	Lara Gooch	8+9	4	2+1	0	20	4
26	MF	(Australia)	Josie Allan	0+4	0	0	0	4	0
28	MF	(Australia)	Emma Dundas	16+3	1	1+2	0	22	1
30	GK	(Australia)	Tiahna Robertson	1	0	2	0	3	0
31	GK	(Australia)	Lily-Rose Dunbar	0+1	0	0	0	1	0

=== Disciplinary record ===
Includes all competitions. The list is sorted by squad number when total cards are equal. Players with no cards not included in the list.

Rank	No.	Pos.	Nat.	Name	A-League Women						Total		
Rank	No.	Pos.	Nat.	Name	Regular season			Finals series			Total		
Rank	No.	Pos.	Nat.	Name	Yellow card	(yellow card) (yellow-red card)	Red card	Yellow card	(yellow card) (yellow-red card)	Red card	Yellow card	(yellow card) (yellow-red card)	Red card
1	1	GK	(United States)	Isobel Nino	0	0	1	0	0	0	0	0	1
2	15	DF	(Australia)	Alexandra Huynh	2	1	0	2	0	0	4	1	0
3	3	DF	(Australia)	Claudia Cicco	5	0	0	0	0	0	5	0	0
3	18	MF	(Australia)	Sophie Haban	4	0	0	1	0	0	5	0	0
3	22	DF	(Switzerland)	Lorea Baumann	4	0	0	1	0	0	5	0	0
6	10	MF	(Australia)	Libby Copus-Brown	3	0	0	1	0	0	4	0	0
6	28	MF	(Australia)	Emma Dundas	4	0	0	0	0	0	4	0	0
8	9	MF	(Australia)	MelinaJ Barbieri	3	0	0	0	0	0	3	0	0
8	24	FW	(Australia)	Milan Hammond	3	0	0	0	0	0	3	0	0
10	4	DF	(Australia)	Natasha Prior	2	0	0	0	0	0	2	0	0
10	23	DF	(Australia)	Zoe Karipidis	2	0	0	0	0	0	2	0	0
10	25	MF	(Australia)	Lara Gooch	1	0	0	1	0	0	2	0	0
13	6	MF	(Australia)	Cassidy Davis	1	0	0	0	0	0	1	0	0
13	13	FW	(Australia)	Lauren Allen	1	0	0	0	0	0	1	0	0
13	28	MF	(Australia)	Emma Dundas	0	0	0	1	0	0	1	0	0
Total					33	1	1	7	0	0	40	1	1

=== Clean sheets ===
Includes all competitions. The list is sorted by squad number when total clean sheets are equal. Numbers in parentheses represent games where both goalkeepers participated and both kept a clean sheet; the number in parentheses is awarded to the goalkeeper who was substituted on, whilst a full clean sheet is awarded to the goalkeeper who was on the field at the start of play. Goalkeepers with no clean sheets not included in the list.

Rank	No.	Nat.	Goalkeeper	A-League Women		Total
Rank	No.	Nat.	Goalkeeper	Regular season	Finals series	Total
1	1	(United States)	Isobel Nino	2	0	2
2	30	(Australia)	Tiahna Robertson	1	0	1
Total				3	0	3

== See also ==
- 2023–24 Newcastle Jets FC season
