= Olivia Page (footballer, born 2005) =

New Zealand footballer (born 2005)

Personal information
- Full name: Olivia Jane Page
- Date of birth: 2 February 2005 (age 21)
- Height: 1.77 m (5 ft 10 in)
- Positions: Defender; midfielder

Team information
- Current team: Huddersfield Town
- Number: 18

Senior career*
| Years | Team | Apps | (Gls) |
| 2022–2023 | Eastern Suburbs | | |
| 2023–2025 | Sheffield United | 7 | (0) |
| 2025–2026 | Newcastle Jets | 7 | (0) |
| 2026– | Huddersfield Town | 0 | (0) |

International career^{‡}
| 2022 | New Zealand U17 | 3 | (0) |
| 2025 | New Zealand U20 | 3 | (0) |
- * Club domestic league appearances and goals as of 29 August 2026 ‡ National team caps and goals as of 24 January 2026

Olivia Jane Page (born 2 February 2005) is a New Zealand footballer who plays as a defender or midfielder for National League North club Huddersfield Town.

She began her career in her native New Zealand playing for Eastern Suburbs. She later played in England for Sheffield United, in Australia for Newcastle Jets, and has represented New Zealand as an under-17 and under-20 youth international. Primarily deployed as a centre back, she has also been played at left back.

== Early life ==
Page was born on 2 February 2005. She is of English descent, and has family living in England.

== Club career ==
=== Eastern Suburbs ===
Page began her senior career at New Zealand Women's National League (NZWNL) club Eastern Suburbs. She played an instrumental role in helping the club win their first ever title in the 2022 season.

=== Sheffield United ===
Page signed for Women's Championship club Sheffield United ahead of the 2023–24 season. She made her debut for the club on 11 October 2023, starting in and playing the full 90 minutes of a 3–2 home loss in the Women's League Cup to Sunderland at North Street in Alfreton. However, she did not make her league debut for the club until the 2024–25 season, coming on as a substitute in a 1–0 home loss to London City Lionesses at Bramall Lane in Highfield on 2 November 2024. She left the club at the end of the 2024–25 season following the expiration of her contract.

=== Newcastle Jets ===
Page signed for A-League Women club Newcastle Jets ahead of the 2025–26 season. She was reunited at the club with manager Stephen Hoyle (who coached her when she was 14 years old), and joined three other New Zealanders at the club (Kelli Brown, Charlotte Lancaster and Anna Leat). She made her debut for the club on 2 November 2025 in a 2–1 away win over Canberra United at McKellar Park in McKellar. She got her first assist for the club on 13 December 2025, assisting Melina Ayres' opening goal in a 3–0 home win over Brisbane Roar at Newcastle Number 2 Sports Ground in Newcastle West. In August 2026, the club announced Page's departure at the conclusion of her contract.

=== Huddersfield Town ===
On 18 August 2026, Page signed for recently promoted National League North club Huddersfield Town. She made her debut on 23 August 2026 in a 5–1 home victory over Loughborough Lightning at the Accu Stadium.

== International career ==
Page was called up for the New Zealand under-17 national team as part of Leon Birnie's 21-player squad for the 2022 FIFA U-17 Women's World Cup in India. She came on as a substitute in all three group stage matches: a 3–1 loss to Chile on 11 October, a 4–0 loss to Nigeria on 14 October and a 3–1 loss to Germany. All three of the matches were held at Jawaharlal Nehru Stadium in Margao, Goa, and the Young Ferns were eliminated in the group stage with zero points.

Page was later selected for the under-20 national team, with Birnie including her in his 21-player squad for the 2024 FIFA U-20 Women's World Cup in Colombia. She was substituted on in a 7–0 loss to Japan on 2 September and a 3–1 loss to Austria, both hosted at Estadio Metropolitano de Techo in Bogotá, before starting in a 3–1 loss to Ghana at Estadio Olímpico Pascual Guerrero in Cali on 8 September. The Junior Ferns were again eliminated in the group stage with zero points.
