= Charlotte Lancaster =

New Zealand footballer (born 2003)

Personal information
- Full name: Charlotte Sarah Lancaster
- Date of birth: 8 November 2003 (age 22)
- Height: 1.71 m (5 ft 7 in)
- Position: Midfielder

Team information
- Current team: Central Coast Mariners
- Number: 5

Youth career
- Palmerston North Marist

Senior career*
Years	Team	Apps	(Gls)
2021–2023	Wellington Phoenix	13	(0)
2023–2024	Eastern Suburbs	4	(8)
2024–2025	APIA Leichhardt		
2025–2026	Newcastle Jets	13	(3)
2026	APIA Leichhardt		
2026–	Central Coast Mariners	0	(0)

International career^{‡}
2022–2023	New Zealand U20	4	(1)
2026–	New Zealand	4	(0)
- * Club domestic league appearances and goals as of 25 May 2026. ‡ National team caps and goals as of 25 May 2026.

Charlotte Sarah Lancaster (/ˈlæŋkæstər/ LANG-kast-ər; born 8 November 2003) is a New Zealand footballer who plays as a midfielder for A-League Women club Central Coast Mariners. She previously played for A-League Women clubs Wellington Phoenix and Newcastle Jets, New Zealand Women's National League (NZWNL) club Eastern Suburbs and National Premier Leagues NSW Women's (NPL NSW Women's) club APIA Leichhardt, and has previously represented the New Zealand under-20 national team.

== Early life ==
Lancaster was born on 8 November 2003. She grew up in Napier, Hawke's Bay.

== Club career ==
=== Wellington Phoenix ===
Lancaster signed for Wellington Phoenix on a scholarship ahead of the 2021–22 season, the club's inaugural season in the A-League Women. She made her debut on 31 January 2022, coming on as a substitute in a 3–2 loss away to Perth Glory, held at Blacktown Football Park in Rooty Hill, Sydney.

Lancaster remained at the club for the 2022–23 season, during which she started her first game in what would be her final game for the club, starting and assisting in a 3–1 away win over Adelaide United at the State Centre for Football in Gepps Cross, Adelaide on 28 March 2023. She departed the club at the end of the season.

=== Newcastle Jets ===
Lancaster returned to the A-League Women ahead of the 2025–26 season, signing for Newcastle Jets. At the club she joined fellow New Zealanders Kelli Brown, Anna Leat and Olivia Page, as well as English manager Stephen Hoyle who previously coached her at Eastern Suburbs in the New Zealand Women's National League (NZWNL). She scored on her debut on 2 November 2025 in a 2–1 away win over Canberra United at McKellar Park in McKellar, Canberra. In August 2026, the club announced Lancaster's departure at the conclusion of her contract.

=== Central Coast Mariners ===
In September 2026, after spending the off-season at APIA Leichhardt, Lancaster signed with A-League Women club Central Coast Mariners.

== International career ==
=== New Zealand U20 ===
Lancaster was called up for the New Zealand under-20 national team as part of Welsh manager Gemma Lewis' 21-player squad for the 2022 FIFA U-20 Women's World Cup in Costa Rica. She came on as a substitute in a 1–1 draw with Mexico and a 3–0 loss to Germany, both at Estadio Alejandro Morera Soto in Alajuela, and scored after coming on as a substitute in a 2–2 draw with Colombia at Costa Rica National Stadium in San José. New Zealand were eliminated in the group stage.

=== New Zealand ===
Lancaster was called up for the Football Ferns for the first time in February 2026 by coach Michael Mayne as part of the 2027 FIFA Women's World Cup qualification campaign. Lancaster made her debut by coming on after halftime for Indiah-Paige Riley on 27 February in an 8–0 win against Samoa.
