= Newcastle Sports Ground =

Newcastle Sports Ground may refer to two neighboring sports fields in Newcastle, New South Wales:

- Newcastle Number 1 Sports Ground (established 1876), oval
- Newcastle Number 2 Sports Ground (established in 2012), rectangular
