= Sophie Hoban =

Australian soccer player

Personal information
- Date of birth: 31 May 2001 (age 25)
- Place of birth: Sydney, New South Wales, Australia
- Height: 1.68 m (5 ft 6 in)
- Positions: Midfielder; defender

Team information
- Current team: Torreense

Youth career
- Queens Park FC

College career
Years	Team	Apps	(Gls)
2018–2020	Iowa Western Reivers	16	(0)

Senior career*
Years	Team	Apps	(Gls)
2020–2023	APIA Leichhardt		
2023–2026	Newcastle Jets	60	(7)
2026–	Torreense	0	(0)
- * Club domestic league appearances and goals as of 26 August 2026

Sophie Hoban (/ˈhoʊbɪn/ HOH-bən; 31 May 2001) is an Australian soccer player who plays as a midfielder for Campeonato Nacional Feminino club Torreense.

== Early life ==
Hoban was born on 31 May 2001 in Sydney. Growing up in the Eastern Suburbs, she played junior soccer for Queens Park FC and attended St Clare's College, an independent Roman Catholic all-girls high school in the suburb of Waverley.

== College career ==
Hoban moved to the United States in 2018, where she took up a scholarship at Iowa Western Community College in Council Bluffs, Iowa. Playing as a defender, was rostered for college soccer team Iowa Western Reivers during the 2019–20 season, during which they won the Regional Championship. She then returned home to Australia in 2020, having made a total of 16 appearances.

== Club career ==
=== Newcastle Jets ===
Following standout performances for APIA Leichhardt in the National Premier Leagues NSW Women's (NPL NSW Women's), Hoban signed for A-League Women club Newcastle Jets ahead of the 2023–24 season. She made her debut for the club on 5 November 2023, coming on as a substitute in a 1–1 home draw with Western Sydney Wanderers at Newcastle International Sports Centre in New Lambton. She scored her first goal for the club on 13 April 2024 in an elimination final away to Western United at Wyndham City Stadium in Tarneit, in which the Jets won 4–2 after extra time. She made a total of 23 appearances for the club over the course of the 2023–24 season, in which she scored one goal.

Following what was described as a breakout season in 2023–24, Hoban signed a two year contract extension ahead of the 2024–25 season. She scored her first goal of the season and her first brace for the club on 1 March 2025, netting two goals in a 2–1 home win over Perth Glory at Newcastle Number 2 Sports Ground in Newcastle West. She scored again on 21 March 2025 in a 4–3 defeat away to Melbourne Victory at The Home of the Matildas in Bundoora. Over the course of the 2024–25 season, she played 22 games and scored three goals. At the end of season awards ceremony, she won the club's A-League Women's Player of the Year award.

Prior to the 2025–26 season, Hoban suffered a major leg injury, which saw her miss the start of the season. She returned on 19 December 2025, coming on as a substitute in a 3–1 home loss to Melbourne Victory at Number 2 Sportsground. In August 2026, Hoban departed Newcastle Jets at the conclusion of her contract to pursue an opportunity in Europe.

=== Torreense ===
A few days after departing Newcastle Jets, Portuguese club Torreense announced the signing of Hoban, joining fellow Australian Ella Tonkin at the club.
