= Gia Vicari =

American soccer player (born 2001)

Personal information
- Full name: Giavanna Valentina Vicari
- Date of birth: April 2, 2001 (age 24)
- Place of birth: Reading, Pennsylvania, United States
- Height: 5 ft 9 in (1.75 m)
- Position: Forward

Team information
- Current team: Fram

College career
Years	Team	Apps	(Gls)
2019–2023	Georgetown University	76	(25)
2023	Rutgers University	14	(2)

Senior career*
Years	Team	Apps	(Gls)
2024	Odense Boldklub	10	(6)
2024–2025	Newcastle Jets	4	(0)
2026–	Fram	0	(0)
- * Club domestic league appearances and goals as of 18:41, 16 March 2026 (UTC)

Giavanna Valentina Vicari (born April 2, 2001) is an American professional women's soccer player who plays as a forward Icelandic team Fram. She previously played professional soccer in Denmark for Odense Boldklub and in Australia for Newcastle Jets. In college soccer, she played for Georgetown University and Rutgers University.

== Youth career ==
Vicari attended The Baldwin School in Bryn Mawr, Pennsylvania for high school. At The Baldwin School she was named 2018 All-American finished as the all-time record holder in goals and points with 81 goals and 41 assists. Vicari began her youth career playing for FC Revolution. She then played for FC Delco in the ECNL and concluded her youth career at Penn Fusion SA in the Development Academy. At Penn Fusion she was named to the IMG Top 150 Girls Club Soccer Player rankings in 2018.

== College career ==
=== Georgetown University ===
In 2019, Vicari attended Georgetown University where she played four seasons (2019–23) with the women's soccer team. During her time with the Hoyas, Vicari totaled 67 points on 25 goals and 17 assists in 76 games. Eleven of the 25 goals were named as game-winners. Vicari was named to First Team All-Big East for three consecutive years (2020–22) and lead her team's offensive efforts over those three seasons.

=== Rutgers University ===
Entering the 2023 season, Vicari was named to the Top Drawer Soccer Preseason Top 100 players, ranked #32. In her season with the Scarlet Knights, Vicari totaled six points on two goals and two assists in 14 games.

== Professional career ==
=== Odense Boldklub ===
In January 2024, Vicari signed her first professional contract with Odense Boldklub in Odense, Denmark. Vicari spent six months in Denmark, helping OB earn promotion to the Kvinde-DM Liga. In the 10-game spring season, Vicari had six goals and finished as the leading-scorer of Odense Boldklub.

=== Newcastle Jets ===
Vicari joined Newcastle Jets for the 2024–25 A-League Women season in Australia. She made her debut for the club against Wellington Phoenix in Newcastle Jets' first win of the season. In July 2025, Vicari left the club at the end of her contract.

=== Fram ===
In January 2026, Vicari signed for Fram in Iceland.
