= Danielle Krzyzaniak =

Canadian soccer player (born 1996)

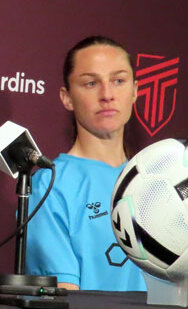
- Krzyzaniak in 2026

Personal information
- Date of birth: September 21, 1996 (age 30)
- Place of birth: Bolton, Ontario, Canada
- Height: 1.85 m (6 ft 1 in)
- Position: Goalkeeper

Team information
- Current team: AFC Toronto
- Number: 70

Youth career
- Caledon SC

College career
Years	Team	Apps	(Gls)
2014–2017	Bethel Wildcats	67	(0)

Senior career*
Years	Team	Apps	(Gls)
2018	Chattanooga FC		
2019–2022	Chattanooga Lady Red Wolves		
2022–2023	FC Carmen București		
2023–2024	Sparta Prague B	3	(0)
2023–2024	Sparta Prague	7	(0)
2024–2025	Newcastle Jets	16	(0)
2025–	AFC Toronto	3	(0)

International career
2013	Canada (futsal)		

Managerial career
- 2018–2019: Jacksonville State Gamecocks (assistant)
- * Club domestic league appearances and goals as of October 28, 2026

Danielle Krzyzaniak (born September 21, 1996) is a Canadian soccer player who plays for AFC Toronto in the Northern Super League.

== Early life ==
Krzyzaniak grew up in Caledon, Ontario. She played youth soccer with Caledon SC.

== College career ==
Krzyzaniak attended Bethel University, where she played for the women's soccer team. In 2014, she was named to the Southern States Athletic Conference All-Freshman Team. She was named to the All-Southern States Athletic Conference First Team three consecutive years from 2015 to 2017 and was named the Top Goalkeeper (Golden Glove) in 2016. In 2017, she was also named an NAIA Honorable-Mention All-American and was named to the All-South Region Team. She was also named Bethel's Female Athlete of the Year in 2017. Over her four years, she appeared in 67 games, with 31 wins and 17 shutouts.

== Club career ==
In 2018, Krzyzaniak played with Chattanooga FC in the Women's Premier Soccer League. In 2019, Krzyzaniak joined the Chattanooga Lady Red Wolves in the Women's Premier Soccer League. She was named the WPSL Goalkeeper of the Year in both 2019 and 2021 (there was no 2020 season due to the COVID-19 pandemic), was named to the Southeast Conference All-Conference team both years, WPSL Defender of the Year in 2019, and helped the side win the helping the side win the WPSL Southeast Conference title both years. In 2022, she remained with the Lady Red Wolves for their inaugural season in the USL W League.

In September 2022, Krzyzaniak joined Romanian Liga I club FC Carmen București.

In July 2023, she joined Sparta Prague in the Czech Women's First League.

In August 2024, Krzyzaniak signed with Australian A-League Women club Newcastle Jets. She earned red cards in two of her first four appearances, due to handling a ball outside of the 18 yard box and denying an obvious goalscoring opportunity.

In August 2025, she signed with AFC Toronto in the Northern Super League. She made her debut for the club on October 4, 2025, in a 2–1 win against Calgary Wild FC, making four saves. She was part of the squad which won the first-ever Supporters’ Shield in NSL history. Following the conclusion of the 2025 season, it was announced that she had signed a contract extension to keep her with Toronto through 2026.

== International career ==
In November 2013, Krzyzaniak was named to the Canada roster for the 2013 AMF Futsal Women's World Cup.

== Coaching career ==
In 2018 and 2019, Krzyzaniak served as a graduate assistant coach with the Jacksonville State Gamecocks.
