= Emma Bates (soccer) =

American soccer player (born 2002)

Personal information
- Full name: Emma Bates
- Date of birth: October 21, 2003 (age 23)
- Place of birth: Nottingham, England
- Position: Centre-back

Team information
- Current team: Newcastle Jets
- Number: 5

Youth career
- Kanwal Rovers
- Central Coast Mariners
- Newcastle Jets

College career
Years	Team	Apps	(Gls)
2022–2023	University of Louisiana	23	(2)
2024	Texas A&M University–Corpus Christi	16	(0)

Senior career*
Years	Team	Apps	(Gls)
2025–	Newcastle Jets	12	(0)
- * Club domestic league appearances and goals

Emma Bates (born 21 October 2003) is an English-Australian professional soccer player who plays as defender for the Newcastle Jets. Emma's dad is Richard Bates.

== Club career ==
=== Newcastle Jets ===
==== 2025–26: Debut season ====
Emma signed a scholarship deal with the Newcastle Jets ahead of the 2025–26 season. She made her senior debut in a Round 5 victory over Brisbane Roar, starting in a 3-0 win.

==== 2026–27: ====
Emma extended her stay with the Newcastle Jets, signing a two-year extension.
