= Anna Leat =

New Zealand footballer (born 2001)

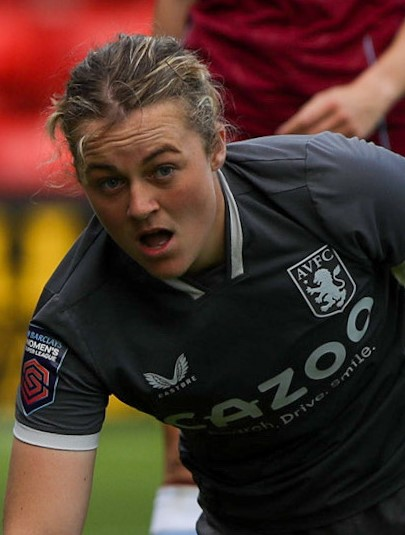
- Leat with Aston Villa in 2022

Personal information
- Full name: Anna Jessica Leat
- Date of birth: 26 June 2001 (age 25)
- Place of birth: Arrowtown, New Zealand
- Height: 1.73 m (5 ft 8 in)
- Position: Goalkeeper

Youth career
- East Coast Bays
- Glenfield Rovers

College career
Years	Team	Apps	(Gls)
2019–2021	Georgetown Hoyas	18	(0)

Senior career*
Years	Team	Apps	(Gls)
2021–2022	West Ham United	4	(0)
2022–2025	Aston Villa	14	(0)
2025	Hibiscus Coast	6	(0)
2025	Eastern Suburbs	0	(0)
2025–2026	Newcastle Jets	12	(0)
2026	APIA Leichhardt	8	(0)

International career^{‡}
2016–2018	New Zealand U17	12	(0)
2018	New Zealand U20	7	(0)
2017–	New Zealand	22	(0)
Medal record
FIFA U-17 Women's World Cup
Bronze medal – third place	2018 Uruguay	Tournament
- * Club domestic league appearances and goals as of 9 August 2026 ‡ National team caps and goals as of 23 May 2026

Anna Jessica Leat (born 26 June 2001) is a New Zealand professional footballer who last played as a goalkeeper for APIA Leichhardt and the New Zealand women's national team.

== Personal life ==
Leat was born in Arrowtown. She attended Rangitoto College in Auckland and was named the school's Sportswomen of the Year in 2017 and 2018.

== College career ==
In February 2019, Leat started studying at Georgetown University and joined the Georgetown Hoyas as a freshman. she would play 18 games, starting in 16 and only allowing 19 goals, helping the Hoyas to 10 wins. She returned to New Zealand after the coronavirus pandemic began.

== Club career ==
Leat played for both East Coast Bays and Glenfield Rovers while at high school. While playing for East Coast Bays, she became the first female to be named in a Chatham Cup squad in the 2021 edition.

On 7 August 2021 it was announced that Leat had signed with West Ham United who play in the FA Women's Super League. On 11 May 2022, West Ham United confirmed that Leat was not offered a new contract and would depart at the end of the season.

On 13 July 2022 Aston Villa announced the signing of Leat for the 2022–23 season. Leat made her Villa debut on 1 October 2022, in a FA Women's League Cup game against Manchester United. After the match ended in a 1–1 draw, Aston Villa won on penalties thanks to four saves by Leat.

She left Aston Villa through mutual consent on 12 January 2025.

On 20 March 2025, Leat signed for NRFL Women's Premiership club Hibiscus Coast as an outfield player.

On 9 July 2025, Eastern Suburbs announced they had signed Leat for the remainder of the 2025 season as a goalkeeper.

Newcastle Jets announced on 25 July 2025 that Leat had signed for the 2025–26 A-League Women season. In August 2026, the club announced Leat's departure at the conclusion of her contract.

== International career ==
Leat made her senior starting début at 16 years old, in a 5–0 win over Thailand on 28 November 2017.

On 25 November 2018, Leat was part of the New Zealand U17 side who became the first New Zealand team in either women's or men's football to qualify for a semi-final at a World Cup. Leat helped the team win its quarter-final against Japan at the U-17 Women's World Cup in Uruguay by saving two penalties and scoring the winning goal. Her final penalty goal won the public vote as the favourite sporting moment at the 2018 Halberg Awards. The team would then lose 0–2 to Spain in the semi-final but win New Zealand's first ever medal at a World Cup by beating Canada in the third place match.

Leat has also played at the 2016 FIFA U-17 Women's World Cup in Jordan, the 2018 FIFA U-20 Women's World Cup in France, the 2019 FFA Cup of Nations, the 2020 Algarve Cup. and the 2020 Olympics in Tokyo.

Leat was called up to the New Zealand squad for the 2023 FIFA Women's World Cup.

On 4 July 2024, Leat was called up to the New Zealand squad for the 2024 Summer Olympics.

== Career statistics ==
=== Club ===
As of match played on 9 August 2026

Appearances and goals by club, season and competition
Club	Season	League			Cup		Others (Note: Appearances in FA Women's League Cup)		Total	
Club	Season	Division	Apps	Goals	Apps	Goals	Apps	Goals	Apps	Goals
West Ham United	2021–22	FAWSL	4	0	1	0	4	0	9	0
Aston Villa	2022–23	FAWSL	7	0	0	0	3	0	10	0
Aston Villa	2023–24	FAWSL	7	0	1	0	4	0	12	0
Aston Villa	2024–25	FAWSL	0	0	0	0	0	0	0	0
Aston Villa	Total		14	0	1	0	7	0	22	0
Hibiscus Coast	2025	National League	6	0	0	0	—		6	0
Eastern Suburbs	2025	National League	0	0	0	0	—		0	0
Newcastle Jets	2025–26	A-League Women	12	0	—		—		12	0
APIA Leichhardt	2026	NPL NSW	8	0	0	0	0	0	8	0
Career total			44	0	2	0	11	0	57	0

=== International ===
As of match played on 31 July 2024.

Appearances and goals by national team and year
National team	Year	Apps	Goals
New Zealand	2017	3	0
New Zealand	2020	1	0
New Zealand	2021	3	0
New Zealand	2022	2	0
New Zealand	2023	4	0
New Zealand	2024	9	0
Total		22	0

== Honours ==
New Zealand U-17

- 3rd place U-17 World Cup: 2018

New Zealand

- OFC Women's Olympic Qualifying Tournament: 2024

Individual

- Halberg Awards: 2018 Favourite Sporting Moment
