= Lorena Baumann =

Swiss footballer (born 1997)

Personal information
- Full name: Lorena Yvonne Baumann
- Date of birth: 11 February 1997 (age 29)
- Place of birth: Wattwil, Switzerland
- Position: Defender

Team information
- Current team: Central Coast Mariners
- Number: 23

Senior career*
Years	Team	Apps	(Gls)
2012–2013	St. Gallen		
2013–2021	Zürich	49	(5)
2016–2017	→ Neunkirch (loan)		
2021–2022	Þróttur Reykjavik	15	(0)
2022	St. Gallen	15	(0)
2022–2023	Þróttur Reykjavik	8	(0)
2023	Damaiense	5	(0)
2023–2025	Newcastle Jets	34	(0)
2025–	Central Coast Mariners	0	(0)

International career^{‡}
2013	Switzerland U17	3	(0)
2015–2016	Switzerland U19	8	(1)
2019–	Switzerland	3	(0)
- * Club domestic league appearances and goals as of 27 May 2024 ‡ National team caps and goals as of 27 May 2024

Lorena Baumann (born 11 February 1997) is a Swiss footballer who plays as a defender for Central Coast Mariners and the Switzerland national team.

== Club career ==
In March 2022, Baumann signed with St. Gallen.

In July 2022, Baumann returned to Þróttur Reykjavik.

In August 2023, Baumann joined Australian club Newcastle Jets. In July 2025, Baumann left the club at the end of her contract.

== International career ==
Baumann made her debut for the Switzerland national team on 14 June 2019, as a starter against Serbia.
