= Lauren Allan =

Australian soccer player (born 1996)

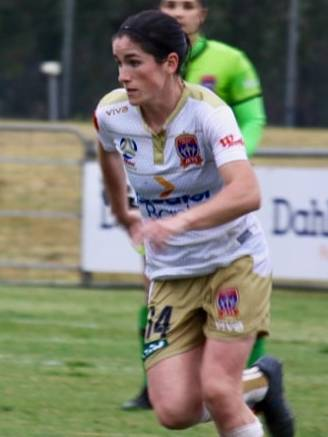
- Allan in 2019

Personal information
- Full name: Lauren Allan
- Date of birth: 14 November 1996 (age 29)
- Place of birth: Australia

College career
| Years | Team | Apps | (Gls) |
| 2015–2016 | Butler Grizzlies | 24 | (26) |
| 2017–2018 | Anderson Trojans | 13 | (6) |

Senior career*
| Years | Team | Apps | (Gls) |
| 2019–2026 | Newcastle Jets | 116 | (24) |
- * Club domestic league appearances and goals as of 5 August 2026

Lauren Allan (born 14 November 1996) is a retired Australian soccer player who played for Newcastle Jets in the A-League Women.

== College career ==
Allan grew up near Newcastle, and played for the Women's Premier League for several years, and at the State Cup. She also played soccer at college in the United States at Anderson University and at Butler Community College where she was majoring in physical therapy.

== Club career ==
Allan was selected in Newcastle Jets' squad for the 2019–20 W-League season, where she debuted in the opening game of the season and was a regular player on the field. She was used as a substitute for the first few games until she was given her first start in a 4–2 loss against Perth Glory in round 11. In that game Allan scored her first goal.

In September 2026, Allan retired from playing football, after playing 116 games and scoring 24 goals for Newcastle Jets.

== Career statistics ==
| Club | Season | League | | | Total | |
| Club | Season | Division | Apps | Goals | Apps | Goals |
|---|---|---|---|---|---|---|
| Newcastle Jets FC | 2019–20 | A-League Women | 11 | 1 | 11 | 1 |
| Newcastle Jets FC | 2020–21 | A-League Women | 11 | 3 | 11 | 3 |
| Newcastle Jets FC | 2021–22 | A-League Women | 11 | 2 | 11 | 2 |
| Newcastle Jets FC | 2022–23 | A-League Women | 18 | 5 | 18 | 5 |
| Newcastle Jets FC | 2023–24 | A-League Women | 25 | 6 | 25 | 6 |
| Newcastle Jets FC | 2024–25 | A-League Women | 21 | 4 | 21 | 4 |
| Newcastle Jets FC | 2025–26 | A-League Women | 19 | 3 | 19 | 3 |
| Career Total | | | 116 | 24 | 116 | 24 |
