= Libby Copus-Brown =

Australian soccer player

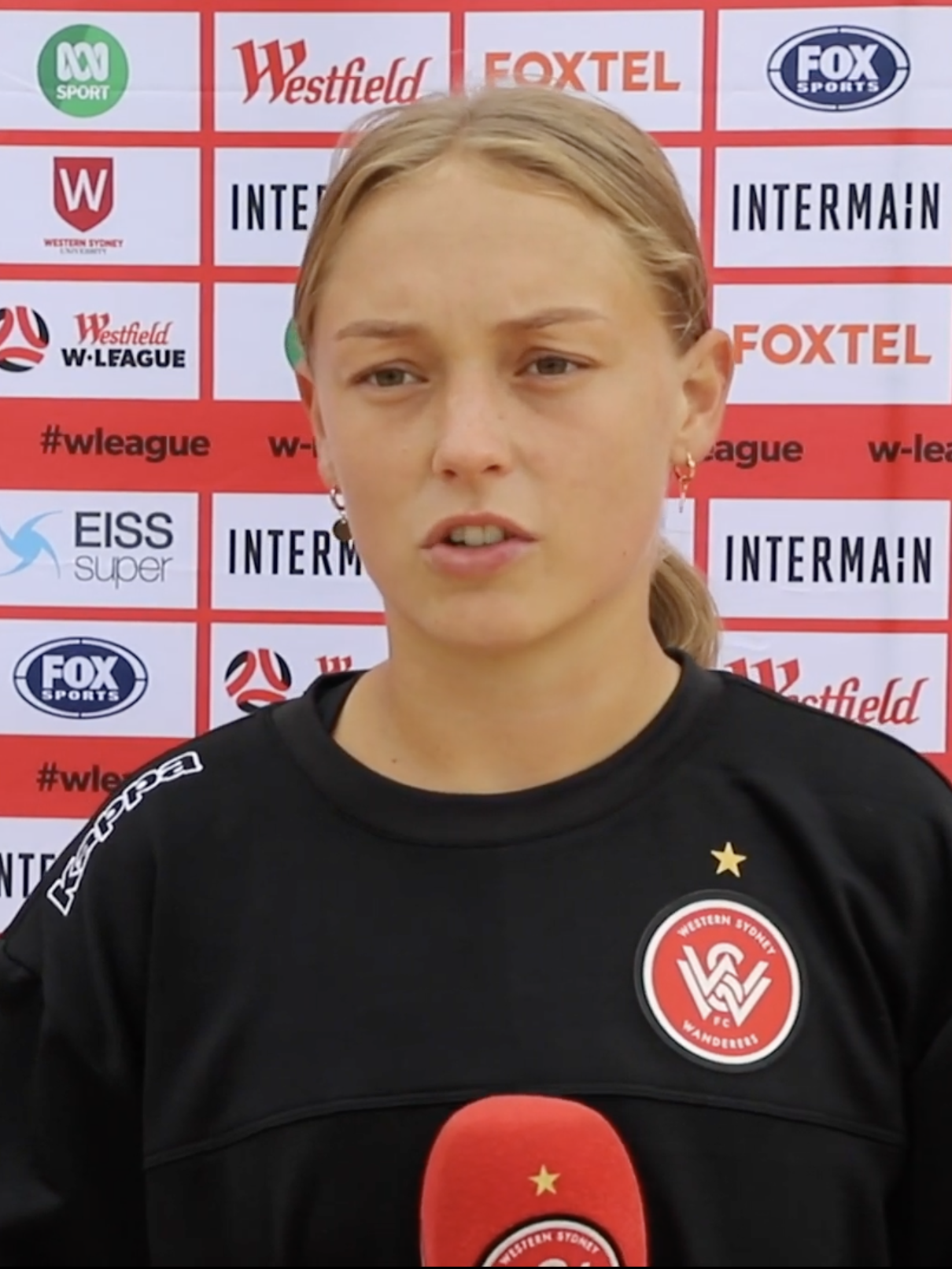

Personal information
- Full name: Elizabeth Copus-Brown
- Date of birth: 10 November 1997 (age 29)
- Place of birth: Brighton, England
- Height: 1.55 m (5 ft 1 in)
- Position: Midfielder

Team information
- Current team: Newcastle Jets
- Number: 10

Senior career*
Years	Team	Apps	(Gls)
2013–2020	Newcastle Jets	38	(2)
2020–2022	Western Sydney Wanderers	26	(1)
2022	Newcastle Olympic	2	(2)
2022–2023	Lewes	15	(0)
2023–	Newcastle Jets	32	(4)
- * Club domestic league appearances and goals as of 8 January 2025

Elizabeth Copus-Brown (/ˈkoʊpəs/ KOH-pəs; born 10 November 1997) is an English Australian soccer player who plays as a midfielder for A-League Women club Newcastle Jets. She has previously played in the A-League Women for Western Sydney Wanderers and in the FA Women's Championship for Lewes.

== Club career ==
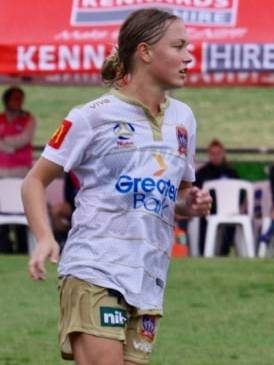
Copus-Brown playing for Newcastle

=== Newcastle Jets ===
She first played as a 16-year-old.

=== Western Sydney Wanderers ===
In November 2020, Copus-Brown joined Western Sydney Wanderers. By the time that the 2021–22 A-League Women season had started, Copus-Brown had eight seasons of professional football to her name. The number of games per season for Copus-Brown gradually increased each season.

In April 2022, Copus-Brown joined NPL NSW side Newcastle Olympic, and 4 months later confirmed she had left Western Sydney Wanderers.

=== Lewes ===
In August 2022, Copus-Brown joined English Championship club Lewes, following a recommendation by former league-mate Isobel Dalton.

=== Return to Newcastle Jets ===
In September 2023, Copus-Brown returned to Newcastle Jets.

On 17 March 2024, Copus-Brown scored the first ever goal at the Wyndham Regional Football Facility, scoring in the 4th minute of an eventual 3–1 win over Western United.
