= Natasha Prior =

English-born Australian soccer player

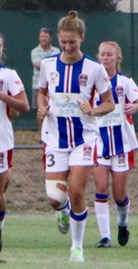

Personal information
- Full name: Natasha Prior
- Date of birth: 20 January 1998 (age 28)
- Place of birth: Leicester, England
- Height: 1.98 m (6 ft 6 in)
- Position: Defender

Team information
- Current team: Newcastle Jets
- Number: 4

Senior career*
Years	Team	Apps	(Gls)
2017–18	Newcastle Jets	11	(7)
2018–19	Canberra United	3	(7)
2021–22	Sydney FC	6	(0)
2023	APIA Leichhardt	22	(2)
2023–	Newcastle Jets	40	(2)

International career^{‡}
2024–	Australia	11	(2)
- * Club domestic league appearances and goals as of 17 May 2025 ‡ National team caps and goals as of 10 July 2025

Natasha Prior (/ˈpraɪər/ PRY-er; born 20 January 1998) is a professional soccer player who plays as a centre-back for A-League Women club Newcastle Jets. Born in England and raised in Australia, she plays for the Australia national team.

== Club career ==
Prior debuted in the 2017–18 W-league season for the Newcastle Jets before transferring to Canberra for the 2018–19 season.

In the fifth round of the 2018–19 season, Prior clashed heavily with Savannah McCaskill and was stretchered from the field. While the initial hopes that the injury was only a mild concussion, it was later revealed to be more severe than that, and Prior was forced to sit out the remainder of the season. As a result of this concussion, which was her fifth in less than six seasons, Prior made the decision to retire at the age of 21, saying "I didn’t really want to have dementia at the age of 30," citing an implied pressure to return earlier than recommended from concussion injuries.

Prior returned to football in 2021, signing with Sydney FC.

On 30 September 2023, Prior signed with the Newcastle Jets.

== International career ==
In November 2024, Prior received her first senior call up to the Australian national team. She made her debut in a 1–2 loss against Brazil on 1 December, coming on as a substitute at half time.

== International goals ==
As of match played 7 December 2024
Scores and results list Australia's goal tally first, score column indicates score after each Prior goal.

List of international goals scored by Natasha Prior
No.	Date	Venue	Opponent	Score	Result	Competition
1	4 December 2024	AAMI Park, Melbourne, Australia	Chinese Taipei	1–0	3–1	Friendly
2	7 December 2024	Kardinia Park, Geelong, Australia	Chinese Taipei	5–0	6–0	Friendly
