= Kelli Brown =

New Zealand association football player

Personal information
- Full name: Kelli Denise Brown
- Date of birth: 21 February 2001 (age 25)
- Place of birth: Ngāhinapōuri, New Zealand
- Height: 1.74 m (5 ft 9 in)
- Position: Forward

Team information
- Current team: Canberra United
- Number: 44

Youth career
- WaiBOP United
- FFDP

Senior career*
Years	Team	Apps	(Gls)
2021–2022	Wellington Phoenix	6	(0)
2022–2023	Northern Rovers	14	(12)
2023	Macarthur Rams	31	(30)
2023–2024	Wellington Phoenix	8	(0)
2024–2025	Perth Glory	13	(5)
2025–2026	Newcastle Jets	19	(6)
2026–	Canberra United	0	(0)

International career^{‡}
2018	New Zealand U17	5	(2)
2019	New Zealand U19	5	(21)
2025–	New Zealand	13	(5)
- * Club domestic league appearances and goals as of 25 May 2026. ‡ National team caps and goals as of 25 May 2026.

Kelli Denise Brown (born 21 February 2001) is a New Zealand professional footballer who plays as a forward for A-League Women club Canberra United and for the New Zealand national team.

== Early life ==
Brown was born on 21 February 2001 in the small rural town of Ngāhinapōuri in Waikato, New Zealand. Growing up, she played for several clubs in Hamilton and representatively for WaiBOP United. She was part of the Future Ferns Domestic Programme (FFDP).

== Club career ==
=== Wellington Phoenix ===
Brown began her senior career in 2021 at Wellington Phoenix, the only New Zealand club playing in the Australian A-League Women. It was Wellington Phoenix's first season in the A-League Women, though their men's team has played in the A-League Men for longer.

She only made six appearances in the entire 2021–22 season due to an ankle injury before the first match and a later concussion.

=== Northern Rovers ===
In 2022, Brown joined New Zealand Women's National League (NZWNL) club Northern Rovers. In the 2022 season, she finished as the club's top goalscorer, having scored 12 times in 14 games (including five goals on her debut against Central Football).

=== Macarthur Rams ===
In 2023, Brown signed for National Premier Leagues NSW Women's (NPL NSW Women's) club Macarthur Rams. In the 2023 season, Brown scored 30 goals in 31 games, finishing as the second highest goalscorer in the league and helping the club to win the grand final after a second-place finish in the league.

=== Return to Wellington Phoenix ===
Brown returned to Wellington Phoenix for the 2023–24 season. She made eight appearances but scored no goals and made no assists.

=== Perth Glory ===
Brown signed for A-League Women club Perth Glory ahead of the 2024–25 season. During her maiden season, she made 13 appearances, scored five goals made and two assists.

=== Newcastle Jets ===
Following the conclusion of her contract, Brown joined Newcastle Jets for the 2025–26 A-League Women season. In August 2026, the club announced Brown's departure at the conclusion of her contract.

=== Canberra United ===
In September 2026, Brown joined Canberra United.

== International career ==
Brown played for the New Zealand national under-17 team at the 2018 FIFA U-17 Women's World Cup in Uruguay. She was a key member of the squad and helped New Zealand finish third in the tournament.

For the senior national team, Brown has made nine appearances and scored 3 goal for her country. On 27 February 2026, Brown scored a hat-trick against Samoa in an 8–0 win for the Football Ferns as part of the 2027 FIFA Women's World Cup qualification (OFC) campaign.

== International goals ==
No.	Date	Venue	Opponent	Score	Result	Competition
1.	27 February 2026	National Stadium, Honiara, Solomon Islands	Samoa	1–0	8–0	2027 FIFA Women's World Cup qualification
2.	27 February 2026	National Stadium, Honiara, Solomon Islands	Samoa	2–0	8–0	2027 FIFA Women's World Cup qualification
3.	27 February 2026	National Stadium, Honiara, Solomon Islands	Samoa	3–0	8–0	2027 FIFA Women's World Cup qualification
4.	5 March 2026	National Stadium, Honiara, Solomon Islands	American Samoa	1–0	3–0	2027 FIFA Women's World Cup qualification
5.	11 April 2026	FMG Stadium Waikato, Hamilton, New Zealand	Fiji	1–0	5–0	2027 FIFA Women's World Cup qualification
