= Stephen Hoyle =

English footballer

Personal information
- Date of birth: 6 November 1992 (age 34)
- Place of birth: Barnsley, England
- Position: Forward

Team information
- Current team: Cooks Hill United; Newcastle Jets (women) (head coach)

Youth career
- Barnsley
- 2009–2011: Doncaster Rovers

Senior career*
Years	Team	Apps	(Gls)
2012	Napier City Rovers	20	(11)
2012–2013	Hawke's Bay United	16	(4)
2013	Toronto Lynx	5	(0)
2014	South Adelaide Panthers	25	(3)
2015	Napier City Rovers	20	(16)
2015–2016	WaiBOP United	14	(10)
2016–2018	Canterbury United	52	(26)
2019	Valour FC	6	(1)
2019–2023	Eastern Suburbs	61	(10)
2024–2025	Napier City Rovers	32	(9)
2026–	Cooks Hill United	5	(1)

Managerial career
- 2025–: Newcastle Jets (women)
- * Club domestic league appearances and goals

Stephen Hoyle (born 6 November 1992) is an English professional footballer who plays as a forward for Cooks Hill United. He is also head coach of A-League Women club Newcastle Jets.

Hoyle has played in four different confederations, at clubs in England and Scotland in Europe, New Zealand in Oceania, Australia in Asia, and Canada in North America.

== Club career ==
=== Early career ===
As a youngster, Hoyle trained at England's FA Academy and with his hometown club Barnsley. He also spent time with the Doncaster Rovers youth side and at the University of Stirling in Scotland. He was converted from a defender to a midfielder during his earlier career.

Hoyle's first stint abroad was in New Zealand with Napier City Rovers and Hawke's Bay United, where he scored a goal in the New Zealand Football Championship playoffs. He then joined Canadian side Toronto Lynx in the Premier Development League, effectively an American fourth division, in 2013. He appeared in five matches for the club, tallying two assists without scoring, and underwent a trial with Toronto FC under then-manager Ryan Nelsen, a New Zealander.

=== Return to New Zealand ===
Hoyle returned to New Zealand and became a striker at the start of the 2015-16 season with WaiBOP United. He ranked among the top 10 goalscorers in the Premiership for four straight seasons from 2015 to 2019, and was Canterbury United's top scorer in the 2017–18 and 2018-19 season.

=== Valour FC ===
Hoyle signed for Winnipeg side Valour FC in the newly launched Canadian Premier League ahead of the 2019 season. He was the second signing in club history and the first international signing for head coach Rob Gale. He scored the first ever goal for the club in its first competitive game, a 2–1 win away to Pacific FC at Westhills Stadium in Langford, BC on 1 May 2019, before being substituted in the second half. He left Valour by mutual consent on 9 July 2019.

=== Eastern Suburbs ===
Hoyle returned to New Zealand ahead of the 2019–20 NZ Premiership season and signed with defending champions Eastern Suburbs.

=== Cooks Hill United ===
In February 2026, Hoyle returned to Australia, joining National Premier Leagues Northern NSW club Cooks Hill United.

== Coaching career ==
In June 2025, Hoyle was appointed head coach of A-League Women club Newcastle Jets on a two-season deal.

== Personal life ==
His younger brother James plays as a defender for New Zealand side Hamilton Wanderers. The brothers were teammates at Napier City Rovers and WaiBOP United.

== Honours ==
=== Club ===
Napier City Rovers

- Central Premier League: 2012 & 2015

=== Individual ===
WaiBOP United

- Fans' Player of the Year: 2015-16

Nomads United

- Mainland Football Mens Striker of the Year: 2018
- Mainland Football Mens Player of the Year: 2018
- Mainland Football Mens Golden Boot: 2018
