= Melina Ayres =

Australian football player

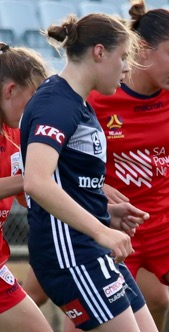

Personal information
- Full name: Melina Ayres
- Date of birth: 13 April 1999 (age 27)
- Place of birth: Melbourne, Australia
- Height: 1.73 m (5 ft 8 in)
- Position: Striker

Team information
- Current team: Melbourne City
- Number: 14

Senior career*
Years	Team	Apps	(Gls)
2015–2017	Melbourne City	16	(2)
2016	Alamein FC	25	(23)
2017–2018	South Melbourne	55	(82)
2017–2023	Melbourne Victory	53	(16)
2022	→ Breiðablik (loan)	9	(2)
2023–2024	Newcastle Jets	14	(6)
2025–2026	Newcastle Jets	20	(8)
2026–	Melbourne City	1	(1)

International career^{‡}
2016–	Australia U20	6	(3)
- * Club domestic league appearances and goals as of 18 October 2026 ‡ National team caps and goals as of 25 October 2017

Melina Ayres (/ɛərz/ AIRZ; born 13 April 1999) is an Australian soccer player who plays for Melbourne City. She has previously played for Melbourne Victory and Newcastle Jets.

== WNPL ==
In 2017, Ayres signed for her junior club South Melbourne FC after spending the previous WNPL Victoria season at Alamein FC. Ayres went on to sign for South Melbourne the following year.

== Club career ==
=== Melbourne City ===
In September 2015 at age 16, Ayres signed with Melbourne City for the 2015–16 season playing primarily in a striker position. She scored her first goal for the club during injury time of the team's inaugural match against Sydney FC solidifying the 6–0 win.

=== Melbourne Victory ===
On 22 September, Ayres joined Melbourne Victory on a one-year deal. Highlights of her 2017/2018 season include a stunning goal against Melbourne City FC in round 11 when she won the ball from Alanna Kennedy and chipped Matildas goalkeeper Lydia Williams from close to halfway. Just one week earlier, Ayres scored another cracker of a strike against ladder leaders Brisbane Roar. With no clear options on hand, Ayres hit a right foot rocket past Matildas goalkeeper Mackenzie Arnold into the top right bin, leaving the keeper with no chance. In October 2020, Ayres signed a three-year extension with Melbourne Victory. In August 2023, Ayres departed the club.

==== Loan to Breiðablik ====
In April 2022, Ayres joined Breiðablik of the Icelandic Besta-deild kvenna on a loan from Melbourne Victory.

=== Newcastle Jets ===
In August 2023, Ayres joined Newcastle Jets. In October 2024, Ayres announced that after nine consecutive seasons, she's taking a break from football.

In August 2025, following her season away from the game, Ayres returned to Newcastle Jets.

In August 2026, the club announced Ayres' departure at the conclusion of her contract.

=== Return to Melbourne City ===
In August 2026, Ayres returned to Melbourne City, signing a two-year contract.

== International career ==
Ayres played in Malaysia for the under-16 national team. Ayres was called up to the Australian under-20 squad for the 2016 AFF Women's Championship in July 2016 held in Myanmar.

== Personal life ==
Ayres is currently studying a Bachelor of Environmental Science at Deakin University.

== Honours ==
=== Individual ===
- Women's National Premier League Golden Boot: (24 goals) 2016
- Women's National Premier League Golden Boot: (40 goals) 2017

== See also ==
- Women's soccer in Australia
