= Newcastle Number 2 Sports Ground =

Soccer stadium in Newcastle West, Newcastle, Australia

- Interactive map of Newcastle Number 2 Sports Ground
- Location: Smith St; Newcastle West, 2302; Australia
- Coordinates: 32.93045°S 151.76040°E
- Owner: City of Newcastle
- Capacity: 5,000
- Record attendance: 4,256 (Cooks Hill United v Newcastle Jets, 13 August 2025)

Construction
- Groundbreaking: 2 February 2011
- Opened: 6 September 2012
- Cost: $4.8 million

Tenants
- Newcastle Jets FC (women) (2017–present); Hunter Wildfires Rugby Union Club (2020–present); Wanderers Rugby Club

The Newcastle Number 2 Sports Ground, more commonly known as No.2 Sportsground is a rectangular sports stadium in Newcastle West, Australia that lies adjacent to Newcastle Number 1 Sports Ground. It is the home stadium of Newcastle Jets (women), the Hunter Wildfires Rugby Union Club (Shute Shield), the Hunter Rugby Union and the Wanderers Rugby Club. It has a current seated capacity of 5,000.

== History ==
The stadium was built as a redevelopment for an existing sportsground next to neighbouring Newcastle Number 1 Sports Ground with multiple changes and redevelopments which started on 2 February 2011 and were completed on 6 September 2012. The Newcastle Jets (A-League Women) confirmed the venue as one their home bases after a $20,000 sponsorship deal with the Newcastle City Council on 26 October 2017.

== Structure and facilities ==
Multiple redevelopments has the venue hold a grandstand with of a capacity up to 5,000 along with an undercover seating area, player facilities and lighting. Other features during the project of the redevelopment included an improved carpark evaluating for up to 284 cars, regrades of the existing earth mounds and provision of additional landscaping and a pedestrian concourse.

== Records ==
The highest attendance recorded at Newcastle Number 2 Sports Ground is 4,256 for an Australia Cup match round of 16 between Cooks Hill United and Newcastle Jets on 13 August 2025. The lowest attendance recorded is 437 for a W-League match between Newcastle Jets and Canberra United on 20 March 2021. 3,842 was the high attendance recorded for an A-League Women match between Newcastle Jets and Sydney FC on 10 December 2023.
