= Newcastle Jets FC (women) =

Newcastle Jets (women)
- Founded: 25 October 2008; 18 years ago
- Ground: No. 2 Sportsground; Maitland Sports Ground; Hunter City Motor Group Stadium
- Capacity: 5,000
- Owner: Maverick Sports Partners
- Chairman: Maurice Bisetto
- Head Coach: Stephen Hoyle
- League: A-League Women
- 2025–26: 9th of 11
- Website: newcastlejetsfc.com.au
Home colours	Away colours	Third colours

Newcastle Jets Football Club (women) is the women's team of the Newcastle Jets Football Club based in Speers Point, Newcastle, Australia. The team competes in the A-League Women; the top-tier of Australian women's soccer, under licence from the Australian Professional Leagues (APL).

== History ==
=== Establishment ===
Formed in 2008, following the Australian women's national soccer team's most successful experience at a FIFA Women's World Cup and the call for the establishment of a professional women's league, the W-League was initially composed of eight teams: Adelaide United, Brisbane Roar, Central Coast Mariners, Melbourne Victory, Newcastle Jets, Perth Glory, and Sydney FC. Seven of the eight teams were affiliated with men's Hyundai A-League clubs, and shared their names and colours to promote their brands. The eighth club was the Canberra-based Canberra United. Naming rights were secured by Westfield, a company co-founded by Frank Lowy.

== Stadiums ==
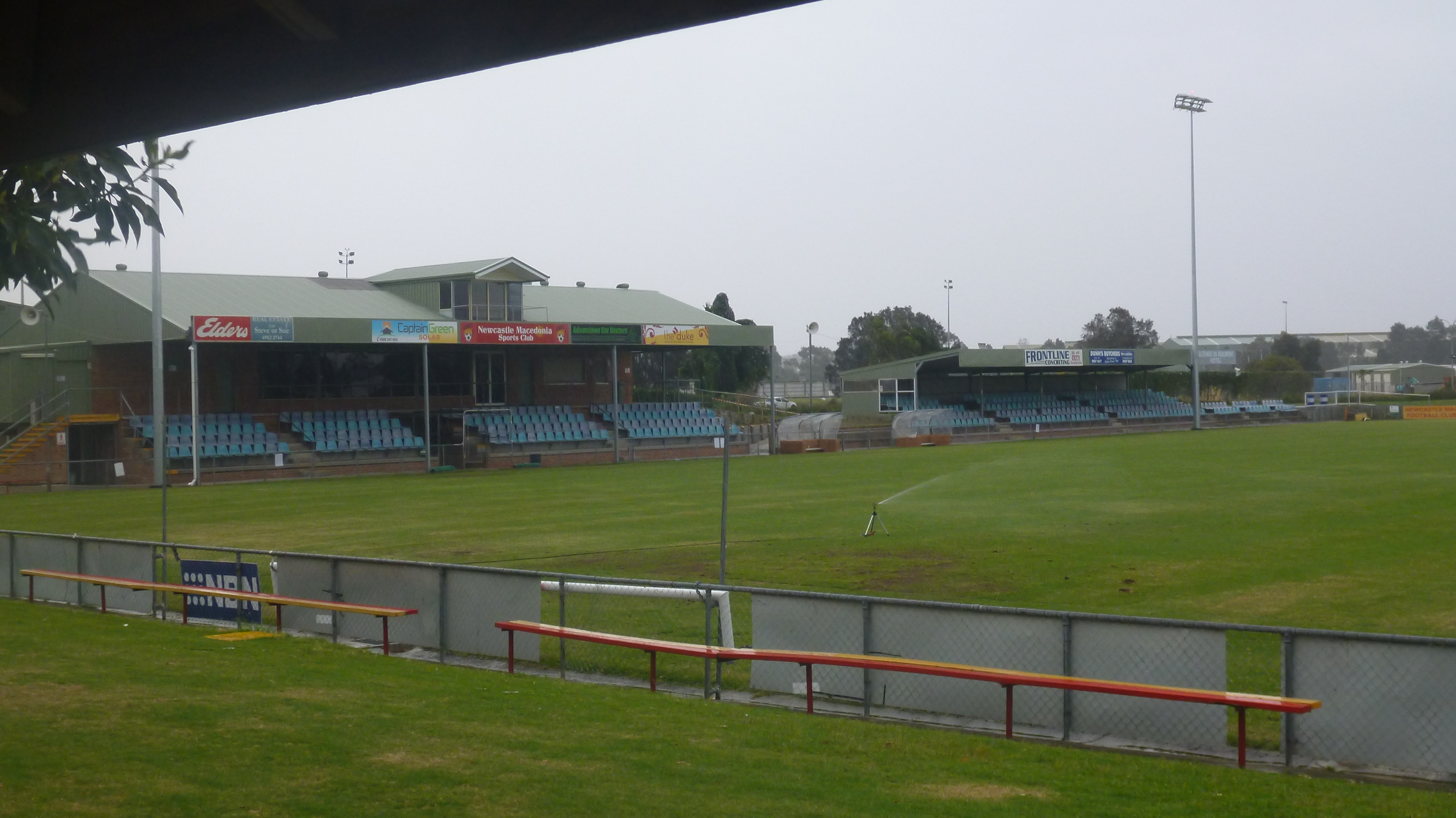
Wanderers Oval grandstand

The Newcastle Jets play their home matches at No.2 Sportsground in Newcastle and occasionally at Newcastle International Sports Centre also known as Mcdonald Jones Stadium located in Broadmeadow, a suburb of Newcastle, Maitland Sports Ground in Maitland and Hunter City Motor Group Stadium in Weston. Before playing at the latter four venues the team played home matches at Wanderers Oval, commonly known as Magic Park, located in Broadmeadow. The stadium features 489 grandstand seats and additional bench seating around the field for a total capacity of 3,500. The pitch surface is grass. It is also the home field for NPL Northern NSW club Broadmeadow Magic FC and occasionally the Newcastle Jets A-League Men's team. However, after a successful attempt in 2017–18 to play some of the team's home matches before the Men's games as Double Headers the club announced in September 2017 that the upcoming season would consist of 4 Double Headers with the Men's at Mcdonald Jones Home Stadium and the sole home game being played at the No.2 Sportsground in Newcastle West which was also unveiled as the training ground for the W League and as a new home ground for the National Youth League sides as part of a partnership with Newcastle City Council.

== Players ==
=== Current squad ===
As of 15 October 2026

Note: Flags indicate national team as defined under FIFA eligibility rules; some limited exceptions apply. Players may hold more than one non-FIFA nationality.

No.	Pos.	Nation	Player
1	GK	USA	Claire Henninger
4	DF	AUS	Natasha Prior
5	DF	AUS	Emma Bates
6	MF	AUS	Cassidy Davis (captain)
7	FW	AUS	Akeisha Sandhu
8	MF	AUS	Emma Dundas
10	MF	AUS	Libby Copus-Brown
11	FW	USA	Allie Thornton
12	GK	AUS	Georgia Ritchie
15	DF	AUS	Lillia Rae (scholarship)
16	MF	AUS	Mackenzie Preston-Poole (scholarship)
17	MF	USA	Alex Klos

No.	Pos.	Nation	Player
19	FW	AUS	Tamar Levin
20	MF	USA	Cameron Valladares
21	MF	AUS	Aaliyah Kilroy (scholarship)
22	DF	AUS	Poppie Hooks
23	DF	AUS	Zoe Karipidis
26	FW	AUS	Josie Allan
27	DF	AUS	Chloe Walandouw
30	FW	AUS	Alexis Collins
32	MF	AUS	Claire Adams
50	GK	AUS	Ally Boertje
—	FW	USA	Erin Flurey

== Management ==
=== Current staff ===
Position	Staff
Head Coach	(England) Stephen Hoyle
Assistant Coach	(England) Jamie Dunning
Assistant Coach	(Australia) Tara Andrews
Goalkeeper Coach	(Australia) Claire Coelho
Head Physiotherapist	(Australia) Dom Veervat
High Performance Manager	(Australia) Erin Wilson
Strength and Conditioning Coach	(Australia) Declan Crook
Football Operation's Manager	(New Zealand) Dani Briggs

=== Managerial history ===
Name	Nationality	From	To
Gary Phillips	Australia	25 October 2008	17 January 2009
Wayne O'Sullivan	Ireland	3 October 2009	12 February 2011
Clayton Zane	Australia	3 August 2011	28 January 2012
Wayne O'Sullivan	Ireland	2 October 2012	27 January 2013
Peter McGuinness	Australia	15 October 2013	7 April 2015
Craig Deans	Australia	3 July 2015	13 January 2020
Ash Wilson	Australia	13 January 2020	2 February 2023
Gary van Egmond	Australia	2 February 2023	15 January 2024

== Honours ==
- W-League Premiership:
  - Runners-up: 2008–09

== Year-by-year ==
Chart of yearly table positions for Newcastle Jets in A-League Women

Year & League	Regular season	Finals Series
2008–09 W-League	Second Place	Semi-Finals
2009 W-League	Eighth Place	did not qualify
2010–11 W-League	Sixth Place	did not qualify
2011–12 W-League	Fifth Place	did not qualify
2012–13 W-League	Seventh Place	did not qualify
2013–14 W-League	Eighth Place	did not qualify
2014 W-League	Fifth Place	did not qualify
2015–16 W-League	Sixth Place	did not qualify
2016–17 W-League	Fifth Place	did not qualify
2017–18 W-League	Third Place	Semi-Finals
2018–19 W-League	Seventh Place	did not qualify
2019–20 W-League	Ninth Place	did not qualify
2020–21 W-League	Eighth place	did not qualify
2021–22 A-League Women	Eighth place	did not qualify
2022–23 A-League Women	Tenth place	did not qualify
2023–24 A-League Women	Sixth place	Semi-finals
2024–25 A-League Women	Eleventh place	did not qualify
2025–26 A-League Women	Ninth place	did not qualify

== See also ==
- List of top-division football clubs in AFC countries
- Women's soccer in Australia
- A-League Women records and statistics
- Australia women's national soccer team
- A-League Women Broadcasting
