= 2023–24 Sydney FC (women) season =

16th season in existence of Sydney FC (women)

Sydney FC (women)
2023–24 season
- Chairman: Scott Barlow
- Manager: Ante Juric
- A-League Women: 2nd
- A-League Women Finals: Winners
- AFC Women's Club Championship: Group stage
- Top goalscorer: League: Cortnee Vine (10); All: Cortnee Vine (10)
- Highest home attendance: 11,471 vs. Western Sydney Wanderers (14 October 2023); A-League Women
- Lowest home attendance: 1,858 vs. Central Coast Mariners (17 January 2024); A-League Women
- Average home league attendance: 4,114
- Biggest win: 3–0 vs. Bam Khatoon (N) (6 November 2023); AFC Women's Club Championship; 3–0 vs. Adelaide United (H) (24 March 2024); A-League Women
- Biggest defeat: 0–4 vs. Melbourne Victory (A) (31 March 2024); A-League Women
Home colours	Away colours

The 2023–24 season was the 16th in the history of Sydney FC (women).

== Players ==
=== First-team squad ===
As of 10 December 2023

Note: Flags indicate national team as defined under FIFA eligibility rules; some limited exceptions apply. Players may hold more than one non-FIFA nationality.

No.	Pos.	Nation	Player
1	GK	AUS	Jada Whyman
2	DF	AUS	Margaux Chauvet
3	DF	AUS	Charlotte McLean
4	DF	AUS	Tori Tumeth
5	DF	AUS	Kirsty Fenton
6	MF	AUS	Lucy Johnson
7	MF	AUS	Teigan Collister
8	MF	AUS	Darcey Malone
9	FW	USA	Shea Connors
10	MF	AUS	Sienna Saveska
11	FW	AUS	Cortnee Vine
12	DF	AUS	Natalie Tobin (captain)
13	MF	AUS	Aideen Keane
14	MF	AUS	Abbey Lemon

No.	Pos.	Nation	Player
15	MF	AUS	Mackenzie Hawkesby
16	DF	USA	Jordan Thompson
17	MF	AUS	Jynaya Dos Santos
18	MF	AUS	Taylor Ray
19	MF	AUS	Zara Kruger
20	FW	AUS	Princess Ibini (captain)
21	FW	AUS	Shay Hollman
22	FW	AUS	Indiana Dos Santos
23	FW	ENG	Fiona Worts
24	FW	AUS	Caley Tallon-Henniker (injury replacement)
26	MF	AUS	Madeleine Caspers
30	GK	AUS	Tahlia Franco
40	GK	AUS	Jasmine Black

== Transfers ==
=== Transfers in ===
No.	Position	Player	Transferred from	Type/fee	Contract length	Date	Ref.
2	DF	Margaux Chauvet	Unattached	Free transfer	1 year	10 August 2023	
6	FW	Lucy Johnson	Newcastle Jets	Free transfer	1 year	10 August 2023	
13	MF	Aideen Keane	Perth Glory	Free transfer	1 year	10 August 2023	
10	MF	Sienna Saveska	Western Sydney Wanderers	Free transfer	2 years	25 August 2023	
4	DF	Tori Tumeth	Melbourne City	Free transfer	2 years	25 August 2023	
9	FW	(United States) Shea Connors	(United States) San Diego Wave	Free transfer	1 year	31 August 2023	
19	MF	Zara Kruger	(Australia) Lions FC	Free transfer	1 year	31 August 2023	
23	FW	(England) Fiona Worts	Adelaide United	Free transfer	1 year	6 September 2023	
40	GK	Jasmine Black	Unattached	Free transfer	1 year	28 September 2023	
8	MF	Darcey Malone	Melbourne City	Free transfer	1 year	13 October 2023	
24	FW	Caley Tallon-Henniker	Unattached	Free transfer		2 November 2023	
25	DF	Jessica Seaman	Unattached	Free transfer		2 November 2023	
16	DF	(United States) Jordan Thompson	Unattached	Injury replacement	7 months	26 November 2023	
26	MF	Madeleine Caspers	(Australia) Football NSW Institute	Free transfer		10 December 2023	
15	MF	Mackenzie Hawkesby	(England) Brighton & Hove Albion	Undisclosed	6 months	29 December 2023	
24	FW	Caley Tallon-Henniker	Unattached	Injury replacement	5 months	15 February 2024	

=== Transfers out ===
No.	Position	Player	Transferred to	Type/fee	Date	Ref.
9	MF	(United States) Madison Haley	Unattached	Free transfer	26 May 2023	
30	GK	Katie Offer	Unattached	Free transfer	26 May 2023	
24	FW	Shay Evans	Unattached	Free transfer	26 May 2023	
4	DF	(New Zealand) Anna Green	Retired		26 May 2023	
16	DF	(Republic of Ireland) Deborah-Anne De la Harpe	(Denmark) HB Køge	Free transfer	6 July 2023	
6	MF	Sarah Hunter	(France) Paris FC	Free transfer	17 July 2023	
15	MF	Mackenzie Hawkesby	(England) Brighton & Hove Albion	Free transfer	21 July 2023	
19	MF	Charlize Rule	(England) Brighton & Hove Albion	Free transfer	26 July 2023	
25	FW	(United States) Rola Badawiya	Central Coast Mariners	Free transfer	3 August 2023	
2	MF	Mary Stanic-Floody	Unattached	Free transfer	10 August 2023	
8	MF	Rachel Lowe	Melbourne Victory	Free transfer	21 August 2023	
23	MF	Anika Stajcic	Perth Glory	Free transfer	21 September 2023	
25	DF	Jessica Seaman	Unattached	Mutual contract termination	10 December 2023	

=== Contract extensions ===
No.	Position	Player	Duration	Date	Note
16	Deborah-Anne De la Harpe	Defender	1 year	26 May 2023	
17	Jynaya Dos Santos	Midfielder	2 years	26 May 2023	
22	Indiana Dos Santos	Forward	2 years	26 May 2023	
7	Teigan Collister	Midfielder	1 year	26 May 2023	
18	Taylor Ray	Midfielder	1 year	26 May 2023	
60	Tahlia Franco	Goalkeeper	2 years	26 May 2023	
11	Cortnee Vine	Forward	1 year	22 August 2023	
26	Madeleine Caspers	Midfielder	2.5 years	11 January 2024	
12	Natalie Tobin	Midfielder	2 years	21 March 2024	Contract extended from end of 2023–24 until end of 2025–26.

== Pre-season and friendlies ==
28 September 2023	Sydney FC (Australia)	2–0	(Australia) Newcastle Jets	Sydney
	Ray 18'; Johnson 44'	Report		Stadium: Sky Park; Attendance: 0 (behind closed doors)

== Competitions ==
=== Overall record ===
Competition	First match	Last match	Starting round	Final position	Record							
Competition	First match	Last match	Starting round	Final position	Pld	W	D	L	GF	GA	GD	Win %
A-League Women	14 October 2023	31 March 2024	Matchday 1	2nd	22	11	6	5	31	20	+11	50.00
A-League Women Finals	21 April 2024	4 May 2024	Semi-finals	Winners	3	2	1	0	3	1	+2	66.67
AFC Women's Club Championship	6 November 2023	12 November 2023	Group stage	Group stage	3	2	0	1	5	4	+1	66.67
Total					28	15	7	6	39	25	+14	53.57

Source: Soccerway

=== A-League Women ===
==== League table ====
Pos	Team	Pld	W	D	L	GF	GA	GD	Pts	Qualification
1	Melbourne City	22	12	5	5	40	29	+11	41	Qualification to Finals series and 2024–25 AFC Women's Champions League
2	Sydney FC (C)	22	11	6	5	31	20	+11	39	Qualification to Finals series
3	Western United	22	11	3	8	37	34	+3	36	Qualification to Finals series
4	Melbourne Victory	22	10	6	6	44	29	+15	36	Qualification to Finals series
5	Central Coast Mariners	22	10	5	7	31	24	+7	35	Qualification to Finals series

Source: A-Leagues
Rules for classification: 1) points; 2) wins; 3) goal difference; 4) goals scored; 5) head-to-head results; 6) Fair Play points; 7) away head-to-head results; 8) home head-to-head results; 9) toss of a coin
(C) Champions

==== Results summary ====
Overall								Home						Away					
Pld	W	D	L	GF	GA	GD	Pts	W	D	L	GF	GA	GD	W	D	L	GF	GA	GD
21	10	6	5	30	20	+10	36	6	2	3	19	14	+5	4	4	2	11	6	+5

Source: KEEPUP

==== Results by round ====
Round	1	2	5	6	7	8	9	10	4	11	12	3	13	14	15	16	18	19	20	21	17	22
Ground	H	A	A	H	A	A	H	H	H	A	N	H	H	A	H	A	A	H	A	H	A	H
Result	W	L	W	L	W	D	D	W	D	D	W	L	W	D	W	D	W	W	W	W	L	L
Position	1	5	8	9	6	5	6	5	4	5	3	3	2	3	3	3	3	3	1	1	1	2
Points	3	3	6	6	9	10	11	14	15	16	19	19	22	23	26	27	30	33	36	39	39	39

Source: KEEPUP
A = Away; H = Home; N = Neutral; W = Win; D = Draw; L = Loss

==== Matches ====
Win Draw Loss

14 October 2023 1	Sydney FC	2–0	Western Sydney Wanderers	Sydney
19:45 AEDT	Fenton 11'; Worts 36'	Report		Stadium: Allianz Stadium; Attendance: 11,471; Referee: Casey Reibelt

21 October 2023 2	Brisbane Roar	1–0	Sydney FC	Brisbane
15:00 AEST	Blissett 21'	Report		Stadium: Ballymore Stadium; Attendance: 3,679; Referee: Isabella Blaess

19 November 2023 5	Adelaide United	1–3	Sydney FC	Adelaide
13:30 ACDT	Blake 45+3'	Report	Worts 20', 26'; Ibini-Isei 79'	Stadium: Marden Sports Complex; Attendance: 1,376; Referee: Lara Lee

26 November 2023 6	Sydney FC	2–3	Melbourne City	Sydney
16:00 AEDT	Thompson 76'; Mclean 79'	Report	Grosso 23'; Ekic 31'; Galic 45+3'	Stadium: Sydney Olympic Park Athletic Centre; Attendance: 3,937; Referee: Georgia Ghirardello
Note: Match delayed for 30 minutes after the 75th minute due to lightning. It was restarted at the 76th minute.

10 December 2023 7	Newcastle Jets	0–1	Sydney FC	Newcastle
16:00 AEDT		Report	Vine 84'	Stadium: Newcastle Number 2 Sports Ground; Attendance: 3,842; Referee: Bec Mackie

17 December 2023 8	Perth Glory	0–0	Sydney FC	Perth
19:00 AWST		Report		Stadium: Macedonia Park; Attendance: 1,568; Referee: Shane Skinner

22 December 2023 9	Sydney FC	1–1	Brisbane Roar	Sydney
19:00 AEDT	Vine 42'	Report	Brodigan 12'	Stadium: Leichhardt Oval; Attendance: 3,241; Referee: Isabella Mossin

29 December 2023 10	Sydney FC	1–0	Wellington Phoenix	Sydney
17:00 AEDT	J. Dos Santos 78'	Report		Stadium: Allianz Stadium; Attendance: 4,866; Referee: Bec Mackie

3 January 2024 4	Sydney FC	1–1	Canberra United	Sydney
19:00 AEDT	Keane 22'	Report	Heyman 32'	Stadium: Leichhardt Oval; Attendance: 3,378; Referee: Mikayala Ryan
Note: Originally scheduled for 12 November 2023, this match was postponed due to Sydney FC's participation in the 2023 AFC Women's Club Championship. It was rescheduled for 3 January 2024.

7 January 2024 11	Central Coast Mariners	0–0	Sydney FC	Gosford
18:00 AEDT		Report		Stadium: Industree Group Stadium; Attendance: 2,734; Referee: Isabella Blaess

14 January 2024 12	Western United	0–1	Sydney FC	Sydney
17:00 AEDT		Report	Vine 70'	Stadium: Allianz Stadium; Attendance: 4,039; Referee: Casey Reibelt
Note: Originally scheduled for 13 January 2024, was moved due to Unite Round.

17 January 2024 3	Sydney FC	1–2	Central Coast Mariners	Sydney
19:00 AEDT	Hawkesby 90+2'	Report	McLean 34' (o.g.); Wurigumula 90+9'	Stadium: Leichhardt Oval; Attendance: 1,858; Referee: Bec Mackie
Note: Originally scheduled for 3 November 2023, this match was postponed due to Sydney FC's participation in the 2023 AFC Women's Club Championship. It was rescheduled for 17 January 2024.

21 January 2024 13	Sydney FC	2–1	Newcastle Jets	Sydney
18:00 AEDT	Caspers 53'; Kruger 90+6'	Report	Bolden 16'	Stadium: Leichhardt Oval; Attendance: 2,547; Referee: Caitlin Williams

26 January 2024 14	Melbourne Victory	1–1	Sydney FC	Melbourne
17:00 AEDT	Lowe 21' (pen.)	Report	Caspers 7'	Stadium: AAMI Park; Attendance: 4,522; Referee: Isabella Blaess

3 February 2024 15	Sydney FC	3–1	Perth Glory	Sydney
19:00 AEDT	Caspers 24'; Vine 59', 85'	Report	Quezada 33'	Stadium: Leichhardt Oval; Attendance: 3,266; Referee: Isabella Libri

10 February 2024 16	Melbourne City	0–0	Sydney FC	Melbourne
17:30 AEDT		Report		Stadium: City Football Academy; Attendance: 709; Referee: Casey Reibelt

2 March 2024 18	Western Sydney Wanderers	0–2	Sydney FC	Sydney
17:00 AEDT		Report	Hawkesby 67' (pen.); Tallon-Henniker 90+3'	Stadium: CommBank Stadium; Attendance: 9,577; Referee: Casey Reibelt

9 March 2024 19	Sydney FC	3–1	Western United	Sydney
19:00 AEDT	Lemon 15'; Vine 70', 90+3'	Report	Zimmerman 77'	Stadium: Leichhardt Oval; Attendance: 3,442; Referee: Rebecca Durcau

17 March 2024 20	Wellington Phoenix	2–4	Sydney FC	Porirua
14:00 NZDT	Cox 63'; Speckmaier 71'	Report	Vine 18', 56'; Jaber 42' (o.g.); Thompson 74'	Stadium: Jerry Collins Stadium; Attendance: 1,010; Referee: Bec Mackie

24 March 2024 21	Sydney FC	3–0	Adelaide United	Sydney
16:00 AEDT	Tallon-Henniker 8'; Hawkesby 24'; Vine 78'	Report		Stadium: Leichhardt Oval; Attendance: 3,137; Referee: Kelly Jones

27 March 2024 17	Canberra United	1–0	Sydney FC	Canberra
16:00 AEDT	Heyman 56'	Report		Stadium: McKellar Park; Attendance: 957; Referee: Georgia Ghirardello
Note: Match abandoned due to lightning on 17 February 2024, and to be replayed at a later date. It was rescheduled for 27 March 2024.

31 March 2024 22	Sydney FC	0–4	Melbourne Victory	Sydney
16:00 AEDT		Report	Murphy 17'; Lowe 38' (pen.); Gielnik 64'; Chidiac 90+6'	Stadium: Leichhardt Oval; Attendance: 4,576; Referee: Casey Reibelt

==== Finals series ====
21 April 2024 Semi-finals 1st Leg	Central Coast Mariners	0–1	Sydney FC	Gosford
15:00 AEST		Report	Hawkesby 54'	Stadium: Industree Group Stadium; Attendance: 4,014; Referee: Isabella Mossin

27 April 2024 Semi-finals 2nd Leg	Sydney FC	1–1 (2–1 agg.)	Central Coast Mariners	Sydney
15:00 AEST	Hawkesby 30'	Report	Badawiya 43'	Stadium: Leichhardt Oval; Attendance: 7,063; Referee: Georgia Ghirardello

4 May 2024 Grand final	Melbourne City	0–1	Sydney FC	Melbourne
16:15 AEST		Report	Connors 69'	Stadium: AAMI Park; Attendance: 7,671; Referee: Casey Reibelt

=== AFC Women's Club Championship ===
==== Group B ====
Pos	Team	Pld	W	D	L	GF	GA	GD	Pts	Qualification
1	(South Korea) Hyundai Steel Red Angels	3	3	0	0	7	1	+6	9	Advance to final
2	(Australia) Sydney FC	3	2	0	1	5	4	+1	6	
3	(Uzbekistan) FC Nasaf (H)	3	0	1	2	3	6	−3	1	
4	(Iran) Bam Khatoon FC	3	0	1	2	3	7	−4	1	

Source: AFC
(H) Hosts

6 November 2023 1	Sydney FC (Australia)	3–0	(Iran) Bam Khatoon	Qarshi, Uzbekistan
15:00 UZT	Worts 3', 58'; Keane 44'	Report		Stadium: Markaziy Stadium

9 November 2023 2	Nasaf (Uzbekistan)	1–2	(Australia) Sydney FC	Qarshi, Uzbekistan
19:00 UZT	Kudratova 90'	Report	Worts 33', 58'	Stadium: Markaziy Stadium

12 November 2023 3	Sydney FC (Australia)	0–3	(South Korea) Hyundai Steel Red Angels	Qarshi, Uzbekistan
15:00 UZT		Report	Nrehy 44'; Hong 54'; Kim H. 70'	Stadium: Markaziy Stadium

== Statistics ==
=== Appearances and goals ===
Includes all competitions. Players with no appearances not included in the list.

No.	Pos.	Nat.	Name	A-League Women				AFC Women's Club Championship		Total	
No.	Pos.	Nat.	Name	Regular season		Finals series		AFC Women's Club Championship		Total	
No.	Pos.	Nat.	Name	Apps	Goals	Apps	Goals	Apps	Goals	Apps	Goals
1	GK	(Australia)	Jada Whyman	22	0	3	0	3	0	28	0
2	DF	(Australia)	Margaux Chauvet	10	0	3	0	1	0	14	0
3	DF	(Australia)	Charlotte Mclean	22	1	3	0	3	0	28	1
4	DF	(Australia)	Tori Tumeth	21+1	0	3	0	3	0	28	0
5	DF	(Australia)	Kirsty Fenton	16	1	0	0	3	0	19	1
6	DF	(Australia)	Lucy Johnson	2+2	0	0+1	0	1+1	0	7	0
7	MF	(Australia)	Teigan Collister	1+1	0	0	0	0+1	0	3	0
8	MF	(Australia)	Darcey Malone	0+1	0	0	0	0	0	1	0
9	FW	(United States)	Shea Connors	2+9	0	0+3	1	2+1	0	17	1
10	MF	(Australia)	Sienna Saveska	0+4	0	0	0	0	0	4	0
11	FW	(Australia)	Cortnee Vine	14+4	10	3	0	0	0	21	10
12	DF	(Australia)	Natalie Tobin	1	0	0	0	0	0	1	0
13	MF	(Australia)	Aideen Keane	7+7	1	0	0	1+1	1	16	2
14	MF	(Australia)	Abbey Lemon	9+7	1	3	0	1+1	0	21	1
15	MF	(Australia)	Mackenzie Hawkesby	15	3	3	2	0	0	18	5
16	DF	(United States)	Jordan Thompson	14+1	2	3	0	0	0	18	2
17	MF	(Australia)	Jynaya Dos Santos	2+5	1	0	0	0+1	0	8	1
18	MF	(Australia)	Taylor Ray	10+9	0	0+1	0	3	0	23	0
19	MF	(Australia)	Zara Kruger	9+6	1	0	0	1+1	0	17	1
20	FW	(Australia)	Princess Ibini-Isei	21	1	3	0	2+1	0	27	1
21	FW	(Australia)	Shay Hollman	16+2	0	3	0	2+1	0	24	0
22	FW	(Australia)	Indiana Dos Santos	6+5	0	3	0	2+1	0	17	0
23	FW	(England)	Fiona Worts	6	3	0	0	3	4	9	7
24	FW	(Australia)	Caley Tallon-Henniker	4+1	1	0+2	0	1+2	0	10	1
25	DF	(Australia)	Jessica Seaman	2	0	0	0	2+1	0	5	0
26	MF	(Australia)	Maddie Caspers	7+2	3	0	0	0	0	9	3
30	GK	(Australia)	Tahlia Franco	0	0	0	0	0+1	0	1	0

=== Disciplinary record ===
Includes all competitions. The list is sorted by squad number when total cards are equal. Players with no cards not included in the list.

Rank	No.	Pos.	Nat.	Name	A-League Women						AFC Women's Club Championship			Total		
Rank	No.	Pos.	Nat.	Name	Regular season			Finals series			AFC Women's Club Championship			Total		
Rank	No.	Pos.	Nat.	Name	Yellow card	(yellow card) (yellow-red card)	Red card	Yellow card	(yellow card) (yellow-red card)	Red card	Yellow card	(yellow card) (yellow-red card)	Red card	Yellow card	(yellow card) (yellow-red card)	Red card
1	21	MF	(Australia)	Shay Hollman	5	0	0	0	0	0	0	0	0	5	0	0
2	4	DF	(Australia)	Tori Tumeth	3	0	0	1	0	0	0	0	0	4	0	0
2	5	DF	(Australia)	Kirsty Fenton	4	0	0	0	0	0	0	0	0	4	0	0
4	13	MF	(Australia)	Aideen Keane	3	0	0	0	0	0	0	0	0	3	0	0
4	15	MF	(Australia)	Mackenzie Hawkesby	3	0	0	0	0	0	0	0	0	3	0	0
7	1	GK	(Australia)	Jada Whyman	2	0	0	0	0	0	0	0	0	2	0	0
7	2	DF	(Australia)	Margaux Chauvet	1	0	0	1	0	0	0	0	0	2	0	0
7	3	DF	(Australia)	Charlotte Mclean	2	0	0	0	0	0	0	0	0	2	0	0
7	16	DF	(United States)	Jordan Thompson	2	0	0	0	0	0	0	0	0	2	0	0
7	20	FW	(Australia)	Princess Ibini-Isei	2	0	0	0	0	0	0	0	0	2	0	0
12	14	MF	(Australia)	Abbey Lemon	1	0	0	0	0	0	0	0	0	1	0	0
12	18	MF	(Australia)	Taylor Ray	1	0	0	0	0	0	0	0	0	1	0	0
Total					28	0	0	2	0	0	0	0	0	30	0	0

=== Clean sheets ===
Includes all competitions. The list is sorted by squad number when total clean sheets are equal. Numbers in parentheses represent games where both goalkeepers participated and both kept a clean sheet; the number in parentheses is awarded to the goalkeeper who was substituted on, whilst a full clean sheet is awarded to the goalkeeper who was on the field at the start of play. Goalkeepers with no clean sheets not included in the list.

Rank	No.	Nat.	Goalkeeper	A-League Women		AFC Women's Club Championship	Total
Rank	No.	Nat.	Goalkeeper	Regular season	Finals series	AFC Women's Club Championship	Total
1	1	(Australia)	Jada Whyman	9	2	1	12
2	30	(Australia)	Tahlia Franco	0	0	0 (1)	0 (1)
Total				9	2	1 (1)	12 (1)

== See also ==
- 2023–24 Sydney FC season
