= 2024–25 Sydney FC (women) season =

17th season in existence of Sydney FC (women)

Sydney FC (women)
2024–25 season
- Chairman: Scott Barlow
- Head Coach: Ante Juric
- Stadium: Leichhardt Oval; Allianz Stadium (doubleheaders)
- A-League Women: 8th
- Top goalscorer: Mackenzie Hawkesby (6)
- Highest home attendance: 3,324 vs. Western Sydney Wanderers (16 November 2024); A-League Women
- Lowest home attendance: 3,324 vs. Western Sydney Wanderers (16 November 2024); A-League Women
- Average home league attendance: 3,324
- Biggest win: 1–0 vs. Western Sydney Wanderers (H) (16 November 2024); A-League Women
- Biggest defeat: 1–3 vs. Central Coast Mariners (A) (2 November 2024); A-League Women
Home colours	Away colours
- All statistics correct as of 14 December 2024.

The 2024–25 season was Sydney FC's 17th season in the A-League Women.

== Players ==
=== First-team squad ===
As of 7 February 2025

Note: Flags indicate national team as defined under FIFA eligibility rules; some limited exceptions apply. Players may hold more than one non-FIFA nationality.

No.	Pos.	Nation	Player
1	GK	NZL	Brianna Edwards
2	DF	AUS	Margaux Chauvet
3	DF	ENG	Faye Bryson
4	DF	AUS	Tori Tumeth
5	DF	AUS	Kirsty Fenton
6	FW	AUS	Shay Hollman
7	FW	ENG	Millie Farrow
8	MF	AUS	Hana Lowry
9	FW	USA	Shea Connors
12	DF	AUS	Natalie Tobin (captain)
13	GK	AUS	Jasmine Black
14	MF	AUS	Abbey Lemon

No.	Pos.	Nation	Player
15	MF	AUS	Mackenzie Hawkesby
16	DF	USA	Jordan Thompson
17	FW	AUS	Kyah Simon
18	FW	AUS	Amber Luchtmeijer
20	FW	AUS	Princess Ibini (captain)
21	MF	AUS	Lucy Johnson
22	FW	AUS	Indiana dos Santos
23	DF	AUS	Rubi Sullivan
24	FW	AUS	Caley Tallon-Henniker
26	MF	AUS	Madeleine Caspers
28	GK	AUS	Beth Mason-Jones
30	GK	AUS	Tahlia Franco

== Transfers ==
=== Transfers in ===
No.	Position	Player	From	Type/fee	Contract length	Date	Ref
7	FW	(England) Millie Farrow	Perth Glory	Free transfer	1 year	17 June 2024	
18	FW	Amber Luchtmeijer	(Australia) Macarthur FC	Free transfer	1 year	12 July 2024	
1	GK	(New Zealand) Brianna Edwards	Unattached	Free transfer	2 years	18 July 2024	
8	MF	Hana Lowry	Perth Glory	Free transfer	2 years	8 August 2024	
3	DF	(England) Faye Bryson	Unattached	Free transfer	1 year	13 September 2024	
23	DF	Rubi Sullivan	(Australia) NWS Spirit	Free transfer	1 year	13 September 2024	
17	FW	Kyah Simon	Unattached	Free transfer	1 year	26 September 2024	
28	GK	Beth Mason-Jones	Unattached	Free transfer	5 months	7 February 2025	

=== Transfers out ===
No.	Position	Player	Transferred to	Type/fee	Date	Ref
7	MF	Teigan Collister	Unattached	End of contract	17 May 2024	
8	MF	Darcey Malone	Unattached	End of contract	17 May 2024	
13	MF	Aideen Keane	Unattached	End of contract	17 May 2024	
18	MF	Taylor Ray	Unattached	End of contract	17 May 2024	
19	MF	Zara Kruger	Unattached	End of contract	17 May 2024	
3	DF	Charlotte McLean	(United States) North Carolina Courage	End of contract	14 June 2024	
11	FW	Cortnee Vine	(United States) North Carolina Courage	End of contract	14 June 2024	
17	MF	Jynaya dos Santos	Canberra United	Mutual contract termination	18 July 2024	
23	FW	(England) Fiona Worts	Unattached	End of contract	31 July 2024	
1	GK	Jada Whyman	(Sweden) AIK	End of contract	7 August 2024	
10	MF	Sienna Saveska	Western Sydney Wanderers	Mutual contract termination	13 September 2024	

=== Contract extensions ===
No.	Player	Position	Duration	Date	Ref.
12	Natalie Tobin	Defender	2 years	21 March 2024	
14	Abbey Lemon	Midfielder	2 years	18 April 2024	
2	Margaux Chauvet	Defender	2 years	24 April 2024	
15	Mackenzie Hawkesby	Midfielder	1 year	14 May 2024	
5	Kirsty Fenton	Left-back	2 years	11 June 2024	
16	(United States) Jordan Thompson	Defender	1 year	18 June 2024	
20	Princess Ibini	Forward	1 year	20 June 2024	
13	Jasmine Black	Goalkeeper	1 year	18 July 2024	
9	(United States) Shea Connors	Forward	1 year	31 July 2024	
21	Lucy Johnson	Midfielder	1 year	24 September 2024	
24	Caley Tallon-Henniker	Forward	2 years	30 September 2024	
22	Indiana dos Santos	Forward	2 years	13 January 2025	Contract extended from end of 2024–25 to end of 2026–27

== Competitions ==
=== Overall record ===
Competition	First match	Last match	Final position	Record							
Competition	First match	Last match	Final position	Pld	W	D	L	GF	GA	GD	Win %
A-League Women	2 November 2024	18 April 2025	8th	23	7	4	12	23	29	−6	30.43
Total				23	7	4	12	23	29	−6	30.43

Last updated: 18 April 2025
Source: Competitions

=== A-League Women ===
==== League table ====
Pos	Team	Pld	W	D	L	GF	GA	GD	Pts	Qualification
6	Western United	23	9	6	8	39	46	−7	33	Qualification for Finals series
7	Brisbane Roar	23	8	2	13	46	42	+4	26	
8	Sydney FC	23	7	4	12	23	29	−6	25	
9	Wellington Phoenix (Note: Wellington Phoenix cannot qualify for the AFC Women's Champions League as they are based in New Zealand, which is part of the Oceania Football Confederation.)	23	7	3	13	25	30	−5	24	
10	Perth Glory	23	6	4	13	27	43	−16	22	

Source: A-Leagues
Rules for classification: 1) points; 2) goal difference; 3) goals scored; 4) wins; 5) head-to-head results; 5a) head-to-head points; 5b) head-to-head goal difference; 6) Fair Play points; 7) away goal difference; 8) away goals per match; 9) home goal difference; 10) home goals per match; 11) toss of a coin in an event of a tie of two clubs.

==== Results summary ====
Overall								Home						Away					
Pld	W	D	L	GF	GA	GD	Pts	W	D	L	GF	GA	GD	W	D	L	GF	GA	GD
23	7	4	12	23	29	−6	25	5	3	4	15	13	+2	2	1	8	8	16	−8

Last updated: 18 April 2025.
Source: Soccerway
Home figures include Sydney FC's 1–1 draw on neutral ground in Unite Round against Melbourne City on 24 November 2024.

==== Results by round ====
Round	1	2	3	4	5	6	7	8	10	11	12	9	13	14	15	16	17	18	19	20	21	22	23
Ground	A	A	H	N	A	H	A	H	A	A	H	H	A	H	H	A	H	A	H	A	A	H	A
Result	L	L	W	D	L	L	L	L	D	D	D	W	L	L	L	L	W	L	W	W	W	W	L
Position	11	12	9	9	10	11	12	12	12	11	11	9	11	11	11	12	12	12	11	11	9	8	8
Points	0	0	3	4	4	4	4	4	5	6	7	10	10	10	10	10	13	13	16	19	22	25	25

Updated to match(es) played on 20 April 2025. Source: Soccerway
A = Away; H = Home; N = Neutral; W = Win; D = Draw; L = Loss

==== Matches ====
Win Draw Loss

All times are in local time (AEST/AEDT).

2 November 2024 1	Central Coast Mariners	3–1	Sydney FC	Gosford
14:15	Pennock 41' (pen.); Gomez 62'; Galic 87'	Report	Ibini 83'	Stadium: Industree Group Stadium; Attendance: 3,000; Referee: Casey Reibelt

9 November 2024 2	Brisbane Roar	1–0	Sydney FC	Brisbane
16:00	Blissett 48'	Report		Stadium: Perry Park; Attendance: 1,856; Referee: Rebecca Durcau

16 November 2024 3	Sydney FC	1–0	Western Sydney Wanderers	Sydney
14:15	Tallon-Henniker 86'	Report		Stadium: Leichhardt Oval; Attendance: 3,324; Referee: Isabella Mossin

24 November 2024 4	Sydney FC	1–1	Melbourne City	Sydney
16:15	Hawkesby 6'	Report	Bosch 11'	Stadium: Netstrata Jubilee Stadium (Note: Match moved from Leichhardt Oval following a pitch assessment.); Attendance: 3,149; Referee: Rachael Mitchenson

8 December 2024 5	Western United	2–1	Sydney FC	Melbourne
17:00	Johnson 55'; De Domizio 88'	Report	Luchtmeijer 58'	Stadium: Ironbark Fields; Attendance: 515; Referee: Molly Godsell

15 December 2024 6	Sydney FC	1–2	Newcastle Jets	Sydney
17:00	dos Santos 22'	Report	Jackson 86'; L. Allen 90+5'	Stadium: Allianz Stadium; Attendance: 3,533; Referee: Caitlin Williams

21 December 2024 7	Wellington Phoenix	2–0	Sydney FC	Wellington
16:00	Jale 59'; McMeeken 88'	Report		Stadium: Porirua Park; Attendance: 435; Referee: Beth Rattray

28 December 2024 8	Sydney FC	0–1	Melbourne Victory	Sydney
16:50		Report	Jancevski 14' (pen.)	Stadium: Allianz Stadium; Attendance: 5,630; Referee: Bec Mackie

5 January 2025 10	Sydney FC	1–1	Melbourne City	Sydney
17:00	Johnson 29'	Report	McKenna 62'	Stadium: Leichhardt Oval; Attendance: 2,340; Referee: Rachael Mitchenson

10 January 2025 11	Perth Glory	1–1	Sydney FC	Perth
22:00	Doeglas 24'	Report	Johnson 45+1'	Stadium: Sam Kerr Football Centre; Attendance: 1,139; Referee: Rachael Mitchenson

15 January 2025 9	Sydney FC	2–0 (Note: The match was abandoned due to lightning in the 54th minute with Sydney FC leading 2–0. The APL upheld the result.)	Canberra United	Sydney
19:00	Ibini 18'; Johnson 38'	Report		Stadium: Leichhardt Oval; Referee: Kelly Jones

19 January 2025 12	Sydney FC	0–0	Central Coast Mariners	Sydney
17:00		Report		Stadium: Leichhardt Oval; Attendance: 2,109; Referee: Kelly Jones

24 January 2025 13	Melbourne Victory	2–0	Sydney FC	Melbourne
16:50	Jancevski 4'; Furphy 77'	Report		Stadium: AAMI Park; Attendance: 2,494; Referee: Georgia Ghirardello

31 January 2025 14	Sydney FC	2–3	Adelaide United	Sydney
19:00	dos Santos 65'; Farrow 90+3'	Report	Condon 23', 54'; Dawber 90+4'	Stadium: Leichhardt Oval; Attendance: 1,488; Referee: Sarah Jones

9 February 2025 15	Sydney FC	1–2	Western United	Sydney
17:00	Hawkesby 14'	Report	Logarzo 6'; Johnson 43'	Stadium: Leichhardt Oval; Attendance: 1,572; Referee: Rachael Mitchenson

15 February 2025 16	Melbourne City	2–1	Sydney FC	Melbourne
19:45	Speckmaier 46'; Henry 89'	Report	Hawkesby 13'	Stadium: AAMI Park; Attendance: 1,216; Referee: Isabella Mossin

2 March 2025 17	Sydney FC	3–2	Brisbane Roar	Sydney
17:00	Hawkesby 13'; Tobin 67'; Connors 72'	Report	L. Freier 49'; Hecher 61'	Stadium: Leichhardt Oval; Referee: Caitlin Williams

8 March 2025 18	Newcastle Jets	1–0	Sydney FC	Newcastle
17:00	Gallagher 42'	Report		Stadium: No.2 Sportsground; Attendance: 1,127; Referee: Molly Godsell

15 March 2025 19	Sydney FC	2–1	Wellington Phoenix	Sydney
19:45	Caspers 49'; Ibini 90+8'	Report	Elliott 75'	Stadium: Allianz Stadium; Attendance: 1,507; Referee: Mikayla Ryan

22 March 2025 20	Canberra United	0–1	Sydney FC	Canberra
16:00		Report	Hawkesby 78'	Stadium: McKellar Park; Attendance: 2,194; Referee: Rachael Mitchenson

28 March 2025 21	Western Sydney Wanderers	0–2	Sydney FC	Sydney
19:00		Report	Hawkesby 48' (pen.); dos Santos 64'	Stadium: Marconi Stadium; Attendance: 1,409; Referee: Page Malau-Aduli

12 April 2025 22	Sydney FC	1–0	Perth Glory	Sydney
14:15	Ibini 90+1'	Report		Stadium: Allianz Stadium; Attendance: 2,481; Referee: Sarah Jones

18 April 2025 23	Adelaide United	2–1	Sydney FC	Adelaide
16:50	Worts 46', 76'	Report	Caspers 20'	Stadium: Coopers Stadium; Attendance: 3,527; Referee: Page Malau-Aduli

== Statistics ==
=== Appearances and goals ===
Includes all competitions. Players with no appearances not included in the list.

As of match played 18 April 2025

No.	Pos	Nat	Player	Total		A-League Women	
No.	Pos	Nat	Player	Apps	Goals	Apps	Goals
1	GK	(New Zealand) NZL	Brianna Edwards	9	0	8+1	0
2	MF	(Australia) AUS	Margaux Chauvet	12	0	9+3	0
3	DF	(England) ENG	Faye Bryson	17	0	13+4	0
4	DF	(Australia) AUS	Tori Tumeth	23	0	22+1	0
5	DF	(Australia) AUS	Kirsty Fenton	1	0	0+1	0
6	MF	(Australia) AUS	Shay Hollman	13	0	10+3	0
7	FW	(England) ENG	Millie Farrow	13	1	5+8	1
8	MF	(Australia) AUS	Hana Lowry	4	0	4	0
9	FW	(United States) USA	Shea Connors	19	1	7+12	1
12	DF	(Australia) AUS	Natalie Tobin	23	1	23	1
13	GK	(Australia) AUS	Jasmine Black	6	0	5+1	0
14	FW	(Australia) AUS	Abbey Lemon	17	0	12+5	0
15	MF	(Australia) AUS	Mackenzie Hawkesby	22	6	18+4	6
16	DF	(United States) USA	Jordan Thompson	23	0	23	0
18	FW	(Australia) AUS	Amber Luchtmeijer	11	1	11	1
20	FW	(Australia) AUS	Princess Ibini	23	4	17+6	4
21	MF	(Australia) AUS	Lucy Johnson	18	3	12+6	3
22	FW	(Australia) AUS	Indiana dos Santos	22	3	22	3
23	DF	(Australia) AUS	Ruby Sullivan	3	0	2+1	0
24	FW	(Australia) AUS	Caley Tallon-Henniker	19	1	11+8	1
26	MF	(Australia) AUS	Madeleine Caspers	23	2	20+3	2
28	GK	(Australia) AUS	Beth Mason-Jones	4	0	4	0
30	GK	(Australia) AUS	Tahlia Franco	6	0	6	0

=== Clean sheets ===
Includes all competitions. The list is sorted by squad number when total clean sheets are equal. Numbers in parentheses represent games where both goalkeepers participated and both kept a clean sheet; the number in parentheses is awarded to the goalkeeper who was substituted on, whilst a full clean sheet is awarded to the goalkeeper who was on the field at the start of play. Goalkeepers with no clean sheets not included in the list.

As of match played 18 April 2025

Rank	No.	Nat.	Goalkeeper	A-League Women	Total
1	1	(New Zealand)	Brianna Edwards	3	3
1	13	(Australia)	Jasmine Black	3	3
Total				6	6

== See also ==
- 2024–25 Sydney FC season
