= 2025–26 Sydney FC (women) season =

18th season in existence of Sydney FC (women)

Sydney FC (women)
2025–26 season
- Chairman: Jan Voss
- Head Coach: Ante Juric (to 3 February 2026); James Slaveski (from 3 February 2026)
- Stadium: Leichhardt Oval; Allianz Stadium (doubleheaders)
- A-League Women: 10th
- A-League Women Finals: DNQ
- Top goalscorer: Riley Tanner (5)
Home colours	Away colours

The 2025–26 season was Sydney Football Club (women)'s 18th season in the A-League Women.

== Players ==
=== First-team squad ===
As of 26 March 2026

Note: Flags indicate national team as defined under FIFA eligibility rules; some limited exceptions apply. Players may hold more than one non-FIFA nationality.

No.	Pos.	Nation	Player
1	GK	USA	Heather Hinz
2	DF	PHI	Madison Ayson
3	DF	AUS	Charlotte McLean
4	DF	AUS	Tori Tumeth
5	DF	AUS	Kirsty Fenton
6	FW	AUS	Shay Hollman
7	FW	AUS	Amelia Cassar
8	MF	AUS	Hana Lowry
9	FW	USA	Jodi Ülkekul
10	FW	AUS	Indiana dos Santos
12	DF	AUS	Natalie Tobin (captain)
13	FW	PAN	Riley Tanner
14	MF	AUS	Abbey Lemon
15	MF	AUS	Mackenzie Hawkesby

No.	Pos.	Nation	Player
16	DF	AUS	Willa Pearson
17	MF	AUS	Claire Corbett
18	FW	AUS	Amber Luchtmeijer
19	FW	AUS	Skye Halmarick
21	MF	AUS	Sarah Hunter
22	DF	AUS	Claudia Valletta
23	DF	AUS	Rubi Sullivan
24	FW	AUS	Caley Tallon-Henniker
26	MF	AUS	Madeleine Caspers
29	GK	AUS	Alyse Oppedisano
30	GK	AUS	Tiahna Robertson
31	GK	AUS	Sofia Fante
32	MF	CRO	Bianca Gittany

== Transfers ==
=== Transfers in ===
No.	Position	Player	From	Type/fee	Contract length	Date	Ref
1	GK	(United States) Heather Hinz	(United States) Houston Dash	Free transfer	1 year	30 June 2025	
31	GK	Sofia Fante	(Australia) Sydney Uni	Free transfer	1 year	30 June 2025	
7	FW	Amelia Cassar	Western Sydney Wanderers	Free transfer	3 years	4 July 2025	
19	FW	Skye Halmarick	(Australia) NWS Spirit	Free transfer	1 year	29 July 2025	
17	MF	Claire Corbett	(Australia) Macarthur Rams	Free transfer	1 year	29 July 2025	
16	DF	Willa Pearson	(Australia) BTH Raiders	Free transfer	1 year	29 July 2025	
32	MF	(Croatia) Bianca Galic	Central Coast Mariners	Free transfer	3 years	31 July 2025	
30	GK	Tiahna Robertson	Unattached	Free transfer	1 year	11 August 2025	
9	FW	(United States) Jodi Ülkekul	(United States) Spokane Zephyr	Free transfer	1 year	15 August 2025	
2	DF	(Philippines) Madison Ayson	Canberra United	Free transfer	1 year	22 August 2025	
13	FW	(Panama) Riley Tanner	Unattached	Free transfer	1 year	27 August 2025	
11	FW	(Haiti) Laurie-Ann Moïse	Unattached	Free transfer	1 year	18 September 2025	
29	GK	Alyse Oppedisano	Unattached	Free transfer	1 year	14 October 2025	
21	MF	Sarah Hunter	(France) Paris FC	Free transfer	1 year	30 October 2025	
22	MF	Alyssa Rose	(Australia) APIA Leichhardt	Injury replacement	3 months	31 October 2025	
22	DF	Claudia Valletta	(Australia) Bulls FC Academy	Free transfer	3 months	20 March 2026	
3	DF	Charlotte McLean	Unattached	Free transfer	3 months	26 March 2026	

=== Transfers out ===
No.	Position	Player	Transferred to	Type/fee	Date	Ref
2	DF	Margaux Chauvet	(United States) Purdue Boilermakers	Mutual contract termination	18 June 2025	
3	DF	(England) Faye Bryson	Unattached	End of contract	18 June 2025	
7	FW	(England) Millie Farrow	Unattached	End of contract	18 June 2025	
9	FW	(United States) Shea Connors	Unattached	End of contract	18 June 2025	
13	GK	Jasmine Black	(United States) George Washington Revolutionaries	End of contract	18 June 2025	
17	FW	Kyah Simon	Unattached	End of contract	18 June 2025	
28	GK	Beth Mason-Jones	Unattached	End of contract	18 June 2025	
30	GK	Tahlia Franco	Unattached	End of contract	18 June 2025	
16	DF	(United States) Jordan Thompson	(United States) Brooklyn FC	End of contract	13 July 2025	
21	MF	Lucy Johnson	Unattached	End of contract	16 July 2025	
1	GK	(New Zealand) Brianna Edwards	Unattached	Mutual contract termination	17 July 2025	
11	FW	Princess Ibini	(Turkey) Beşiktaş	End of contract	26 August 2025	
11	FW	(Haiti) Laurie-Ann Moïse	(North Macedonia) Ljuboten	Mutual contract termination	19 January 2026	
22	MF	Alyssa Rose	(Australia) APIA Leichhardt	End of contract	19 January 2026	

=== Contract extensions ===
No.	Player	Position	Duration	Date	Ref.
6	Shay Hollman	Forward	2 years	22 May 2025	
18	Amber Luchtmeijer	Forward	2 years	25 June 2025	
23	Rubi Sullivan	Defender	1 year	25 June 2025	
24	Caley Tallon-Henniker	Forward	2 years	25 June 2025	
15	Mackenzie Hawkesby	Midfielder	1 year	6 August 2025	
4	Tori Tumeth	Defender	1 year	20 August 2025	
16	Willa Pearson	Defender	2 years	27 March 2026	Contract extended from end of 2025–26 to end of 2027–28
17	Claire Corbett	Midfielder	2 years	17 April 2026	Contract extended from end of 2025–26 to end of 2027–28

== Competitions ==
=== Overall record ===
Competition	First match	Last match	Final position	Record							
Competition	First match	Last match	Final position	Pld	W	D	L	GF	GA	GD	Win %
A-League Women	1 November 2025	4 April 2026	10th	20	4	7	9	18	29	−11	20.00
Total				20	4	7	9	18	29	−11	20.00

Last updated: 4 April 2026
Source: Competitions

=== A-League Women ===
==== League table ====
Pos	Team	Pld	W	D	L	GF	GA	GD	Pts
7	Central Coast Mariners	20	7	7	6	27	26	+1	28
8	Perth Glory	20	7	3	10	20	30	−10	24
9	Newcastle Jets	20	7	2	11	30	36	−6	23
10	Sydney FC	20	4	7	9	18	29	−11	19
11	Western Sydney Wanderers	20	5	4	11	18	34	−16	19

Source: A-Leagues
Rules for classification: 1) points; 2) goal difference; 3) goals scored; 4) wins; 5) head-to-head results; 5a) head-to-head points; 5b) head-to-head goal difference; 6) Fair Play points; 7) away goal difference; 8) away goals per match; 9) home goal difference; 10) home goals per match; 11) toss of a coin in an event of a tie of two clubs.

==== Matches ====
Win Draw Loss

1 November 2025 1	Sydney FC	2–2	Melbourne City	Sydney
14:15 AEDT	Stott 20' (o.g.); Hawkesby 62'	Report	McMahon 45+1'; Keane 75'	Stadium: Leichhardt Oval; Attendance: 3,013; Referee: Molly Godsell

8 November 2025 2	Adelaide United	0–0	Sydney FC	Adelaide
15:30 ACDT		Report		Stadium: ServiceFM Stadium; Attendance: 694; Referee: Isabella Mossin

15 November 2025 3	Sydney FC	2–0	Perth Glory	Sydney
14:45 AEDT	Galic 53'; Tanner 70'	Report		Stadium: Leichhardt Oval; Attendance: 2,122; Referee: Georgia Ghirardello

23 November 2025 4	Sydney FC	1–0	Central Coast Mariners	Sydney
16:00 AEDT	Caspers 76'	Report		Stadium: Leichhardt Oval; Attendance: 2,455; Referee: Page Malau-Aduli

7 December 2025 6	Western Sydney Wanderers	0–0	Sydney FC	Sydney
17:00 AEDT		Report		Stadium: Marconi Stadium; Attendance: 1,348; Referee: Isabella Mossin

10 December 2025 5	Canberra United	2–0	Sydney FC	Canberra
17:00 AEDT	Heyman 53'; Dale 65'	Report		Stadium: McKellar Park; Referee: Georgia Ghirardello
Note: The match was rescheduled due to Sydney FC having seven players called-up for international duty.

20 December 2025 8	Wellington Phoenix	7–0	Sydney FC	Porirua
16:00 NZDT	Elliott 3'; Bhandari 13', 69'; Jale 36', 54'; Tumeth 80' (o.g.); Hunter 90' (o.g.)	Report		Stadium: Porirua Park; Attendance: 1,009; Referee: Sarah Jones

4 January 2026 11	Melbourne City	1–0	Sydney FC	Melbourne
17:00 AEDT	Uchendu 52'	Report		Stadium: ctrl:cyber Pitch; Attendance: 972; Referee: Georgia Ghirardello

9 January 2026 12	Sydney FC	0–0	Adelaide United	Sydney
19:00 AEDT		Report		Stadium: Leichhardt Oval; Attendance: 1,857; Referee: Lara Lee

13 January 2026 7	Sydney FC	1–2	Newcastle Jets	Sydney
19:00 AEDT	Cassar 18'	Report	Ayres 29'; Lancaster 90+1'	Stadium: Leichhardt Oval; Attendance: 1,642; Referee: Izzy Cooper

25 January 2026 14	Melbourne Victory	0–0	Sydney FC	Melbourne
17:00 AEDT		Report		Stadium: Home of the Matildas; Attendance: 1,056; Referee: Jock Quartermain

28 January 2026 10	Perth Glory	0–0	Sydney FC	Perth
19:00 AWST		Report		Stadium: Sam Kerr Football Centre; Attendance: 967; Referee: Page Malau-Aduli

31 January 2026 15	Sydney FC	2–3	Western Sydney Wanderers	Sydney
17:00 AEDT	Tanner 7'; Luchtmeijer 84'	Report	Chessari 48'; Ng-Saad 60'; Yuan 70'	Stadium: Allianz Stadium; Attendance: 4,805; Referee: Isabella Mossin

4 February 2026 9	Sydney FC	1–3	Brisbane Roar	Sydney
19:30 AEDT	Lowry 37'	Report	Brown 9'; Hayashi 48', 74'	Stadium: Leichhardt Oval; Attendance: 879; Referee: Molly Godsell
Note: The game was postponed from 28 December 2025, due to the Leichhardt Oval pitch not being ready to accommodate games.

8 February 2026 16	Sydney FC	1–2	Canberra United	Sydney
17:00 AEDT	Ayson 38'	Report	Gordon 13'; Stanić-Floody 86'	Stadium: Leichhardt Oval; Attendance: 1,347; Referee: Mikayla Ryan

13 February 2026 17	Brisbane Roar	0–4	Sydney FC	Brisbane
18:00 AEST		Report	Hawkesby 47'; Pearson 59'; Tanner 68'; Halmarick 90+3'	Stadium: Imperial Corp Stadium; Attendance: 520; Referee: Izzy Cooper

13 March 2026 19	Newcastle Jets	3–1	Sydney FC	Newcastle
19:00 AEDT	Ayres 22'; Hoban 31', 74'	Report	Hawkesby 15'	Stadium: No.2 Sportsground; Attendance: 897; Referee: Izzy Cooper

20 March 2026 20	Sydney FC	1–3	Wellington Phoenix	Sydney
19:00 AEDT	Tallon-Henniker 3'	Report	Vlok 12'; Van der Meer 64'; Nunn 75'	Stadium: Leichhardt Oval; Attendance: 939; Referee: Sophie Allum

28 March 2026 21	Sydney FC	2–1	Melbourne Victory	Sydney
17:00 AEDT	Tanner 31', 49'	Report	Lowe 23'	Stadium: Leichhardt Oval; Attendance: 2,107; Referee: Isabella Mossin

4 April 2026 22	Central Coast Mariners	0–0	Sydney FC	Gosford
14:15 AEDT		Report		Stadium: polytec Stadium; Attendance: 1,656; Referee: Sophie Allum
Note: The kickoff time was moved to allow the match to be broadcast on 10 Drama.

== Statistics ==
=== Appearances and goals ===
Includes all competitions. Players with no appearances not included in the list.

As of match played 4 April 2026

No.	Pos	Nat	Player	Total		A-League Women	
No.	Pos	Nat	Player	Apps	Goals	Apps	Goals
1	GK	(United States) USA	Heather Hinz	13	0	13	0
2	DF	(Philippines) PHI	Madison Ayson	14	1	12+2	1
3	DF	(Australia) AUS	Charlotte McLean	2	0	2	0
4	DF	(Australia) AUS	Tori Tumeth	19	0	19	0
5	DF	(Australia) AUS	Kirsty Fenton	18	0	15+3	0
6	FW	(Australia) AUS	Shay Hollman	3	0	0+3	0
7	FW	(Australia) AUS	Amelia Cassar	18	1	15+3	1
8	MF	(Australia) AUS	Hana Lowry	10	1	8+2	1
9	FW	(United States) USA	Jodi Ülkekul	18	0	11+7	0
13	FW	(Panama) PAN	Riley Tanner	18	5	15+3	5
14	DF	(Australia) AUS	Abbey Lemon	18	0	16+2	0
15	MF	(Australia) AUS	Mackenzie Hawkesby	16	3	14+2	3
16	DF	(Australia) AUS	Willa Pearson	18	1	16+2	1
17	MF	(Australia) AUS	Claire Corbett	11	0	6+5	0
18	FW	(Australia) AUS	Amber Luchtmeijer	13	1	6+7	1
19	FW	(Australia) AUS	Skye Halmarick	14	1	4+10	1
21	MF	(Australia) AUS	Sarah Hunter	13	0	13	0
22	DF	(Australia) AUS	Claudia Valletta	3	0	1+2	0
23	DF	(Australia) AUS	Rubi Sullivan	8	0	6+2	0
24	FW	(Australia) AUS	Caley Tallon-Henniker	14	1	4+10	1
26	MF	(Australia) AUS	Madeleine Caspers	9	1	5+4	1
30	GK	(Australia) AUS	Tiahna Robertson	7	0	7	0
32	MF	(Croatia) CRO	Bianca Gittany	14	1	12+2	1
Player(s) transferred out but featured this season
11	FW	(Haiti) HAI	Laurie-Ann Moïse	1	0	0+1	0
22	MF	(Australia) AUS	Alyssa Rose	1	0	0+1	0

=== Clean sheets ===
Includes all competitions. The list is sorted by squad number when total clean sheets are equal. Numbers in parentheses represent games where both goalkeepers participated and both kept a clean sheet; the number in parentheses is awarded to the goalkeeper who was substituted on, whilst a full clean sheet is awarded to the goalkeeper who was on the field at the start of play. Goalkeepers with no clean sheets not included in the list.

As of match played 4 April 2026

Rank	No.	Nat.	Goalkeeper	A-League Women	Total
1	1	(United States)	Heather Hinz	6	6
2	30	(Australia)	Tiahna Robertson	3	3
Total				9	9

== See also ==
- 2025–26 Sydney FC season
