= 2026–27 Sydney FC (women) season =

19th season in existence of Sydney FC (women)

Sydney FC (women)
2026–27 season
- Chairman: Jan Voss
- Head Coach: James Slaveski
- Stadium: Sydney Olympic Park Athletic Centre; WIN Stadium; Allianz Stadium (doubleheaders)
- A-League Women: TBD
Home colours	Away colours
- All statistics correct as of 24 June 2026.

The 2026–27 season is Sydney FC (women)'s 19th season in the A-League Women.

== Players ==
As of 29 October 2026

Note: Flags indicate national team as defined under FIFA eligibility rules; some limited exceptions apply. Players may hold more than one non-FIFA nationality.

No.	Pos.	Nation	Player
1	GK	AUS	Jada Whyman
2	FW	USA	Faith Webber
3	DF	AUS	Charlotte McLean
6	FW	AUS	Shay Hollman
7	FW	AUS	Amelia Cassar
8	MF	CRO	Bianca Gittany
10	FW	AUS	Indiana dos Santos
11	DF	USA	Kiley Dulaney
12	DF	AUS	Natalie Tobin (captain)
13	FW	PAN	Riley Cohn
14	MF	AUS	Olivia Price
16	DF	AUS	Willa Pearson
17	MF	AUS	Claire Corbett

No.	Pos.	Nation	Player
18	FW	AUS	Amber Luchtmeijer
19	MF	AUS	Amy Chessari
20	FW	AUS	Sophie Aungle
21	MF	AUS	Sarah Hunter
22	FW	AUS	Jada Taylor
23	DF	AUS	Rubi Sullivan
26	MF	AUS	Madeleine Caspers
27	DF	AUS	Poppy Channing
28	MF	USA	Kenzie Roling
29	GK	AUS	Alyse Oppedisano
30	GK	AUS	Tiahna Robertson
33	MF	AUS	Abbie Puckett
37	GK	AUS	Annabelle Croll

== Transfers ==
=== Transfers in ===
No.	Position	Player	From	Type/fee	Contract length	Date	Ref
19	MF	Amy Chessari	Western Sydney Wanderers	Free transfer	2 years	24 July 2026	
2	FW	(United States) Faith Webber	(United States) Denver Summit		1 year	13 August 2026	
13	FW	(Panama) Riley Cohn	Unattached	Free transfer	1 year	21 August 2026	
1	GK	Jada Whyman	Unattached	Free transfer	2 years	24 August 2026	
27	DF	Poppy Channing	Unattached	Free transfer	1 year	3 September 2026	
11	DF	(United States) Kiley Dulaney	Unattached	Free transfer	1 year	3 September 2026	
28	MF	(United States) Kenzie Roling	Unattached	Free transfer	1 year	3 September 2026	
20	FW	Sophie Aungle	Western Sydney Wanderers Academy	Free transfer	1 year	3 September 2026	
37	GK	Annabelle Croll	Western Sydney Wanderers	Free transfer	1 year	3 September 2026	
14	MF	Olivia Price	Unattached	Free transfer	1 year	12 October 2026	
35	FW	Poppy Tay	(Australia) Sydney University	National team replacement	2 weeks	12 October 2026	
24	DF	Josie Wilson	Unattached	National team replacement	2 weeks	12 October 2026	
32	MF	Angelina Scamardella	Unattached	Injury replacement	1 week	23 October 2026	

==== From development squad ====
N	Pos.	Nat.	Name	Age	Notes
22	FW	(Australia)	Jada Taylor	16	one-year contract
33	MF	(Australia)	Abbie Puckett	17	one-year contract
31	GK	(Australia)	Chelsea McCredie	16	2-week national team replacement contract
25	DF	(Australia)	Lauren Nada	17	2-week national team replacement contract
39	FW	(Australia)	Asha Sutton	17	2-week national team replacement contract

=== Transfers out ===
No.	Position	Player	Transferred to	Type/fee	Date	Ref
9	FW	(United States) Jodi Ülkekul	Retired		4 April 2026	
8	MF	Hana Lowry	(Norway) Vålerenga	Undisclosed	15 April 2026	
4	DF	Tori Tumeth	(Canada) Vancouver Rise	End of contract	28 April 2026	
15	MF	Mackenzie Hawkesby	Unattached	End of contract	15 June 2026	
1	GK	(United States) Heather Hinz	(United States) Fort Lauderdale United	End of contract	16 June 2026	
2	DF	(Philippines) Madison Ayson	Unattached	End of contract	16 June 2026	
19	FW	Skye Halmarick	Unattached	End of contract	16 June 2026	
13	FW	(Panama) Riley Cohn	Unattached	End of contract	25 July 2026	
22	DF	Claudia Valletta	Unattached	End of contract	25 July 2026	
14	MF	Abbey Lemon	Unattached	End of contract	26 August 2026	
24	FW	Caley Tallon-Henniker	Unattached	Mutual contract termination	26 August 2026	
31	GK	Sofia Fante	Unattached	End of contract	26 August 2026	
5	DF	Kirsty Fenton	Unattached	Mutual contract termination	3 October 2026	
24	DF	Josie Wilson	Unattached	End of contract	29 October 2026	
25	DF	Lauren Nada	Unattached	End of contract	29 October 2026	
31	GK	Chelsea McCredie	Unattached	End of contract	29 October 2026	
32	MF	Angelina Scamardella	Unattached	End of contract	29 October 2026	
35	FW	Poppy Tay	Unattached	End of contract	29 October 2026	
39	FW	Asha Sutton	Unattached	End of contract	29 October 2026	

=== Contract extensions ===
No.	Player	Position	Duration	Date	Ref.
3	Charlotte McLean	Defender	2 years	22 July 2026	
12	Natalie Tobin	Midfielder	1 year	19 August 2026	
29	Alyse Oppedisano	Goalkeeper	1 year	24 August 2026	
30	Tiahna Robertson	Goalkeeper	1 year	24 August 2026	
21	Sarah Hunter	Midfielder	1 year	25 August 2026	
23	Ruby Sullivan	Full-back	1 year	27 August 2026	
26	Madeleine Caspers	Midfielder		16 October 2026	

== Pre-season and friendlies ==
3 October 2026	Sydney FC (Australia)	0–2	(New Zealand) Wellington Phoenix	Sydney, Australia
		Report	Benson; Main	Attendance: 0 (behind closed doors)

10 October 2026	Central Coast Mariners (Australia)	2–0	(Australia) Sydney FC	Australia
	Trimis	Report		Attendance: 0 (behind closed doors)

== Competitions ==
=== Overall record ===
Competition	First match	Last match	Record							
Competition	First match	Last match	Pld	W	D	L	GF	GA	GD	Win %
A-League Women	TBD	TBD	0	0	0	0	0	0	+0	—
Total			0	0	0	0	0	0	+0	—

Last updated: 24 June 2026
Source: Competitions

=== A-League Women ===
==== League table ====
Pos	Team	Pld	W	D	L	GF	GA	GD	Pts
7	Western Sydney Wanderers	4	2	0	2	5	4	+1	6
8	Brisbane Roar	6	2	0	4	6	9	−3	6
9	Sydney FC	5	1	1	3	5	13	−8	4
10	Adelaide United	5	0	3	2	3	7	−4	3
11	Newcastle Jets	4	0	2	2	2	4	−2	2

Updated to match(es) played on 21 November 2026. Source: A-Leagues
Rules for classification: 1) points; 2) goal difference; 3) goals scored; 4) wins; 5) head-to-head results; 5a) head-to-head points; 5b) head-to-head goal difference; 6) Fair Play points; 7) away goal difference; 8) away goals per match; 9) home goal difference; 10) home goals per match; 11) toss of a coin in an event of a tie of two clubs.

==== Matches ====
The league fixtures were released on 21 August 2026.

Win Draw Loss Fixtures

18 October 2026 1	Sydney FC	2–2	Adelaide United	Sydney
16:30 AEDT	Sutton 6'; Cohn 55'	Report	McLean 8' (o.g.); Breier 88'	Stadium: Sydney Olympic Park Athletic Centre; Referee: Noah Moss

25 October 2026 2	Sydney FC	0–5	Melbourne City	Sydney
18:50 AEDT		Report	Vine 13'; Hayashi 16'; Jackson 24'; McLean 30' (o.g.); Ayres 53' (pen.)	Stadium: Allianz Stadium; Referee: Sophie Allum

31 October 2026 3	Brisbane Roar	0–1	Sydney FC	Brisbane
14:00 AEST		Report	Webber 66'	Stadium: Gioca Stadium; Attendance: 885; Referee: Bec Mackie

15 November 2026 5	Wellington Phoenix	3–1	Sydney FC	Porirua
14:00 NZDT	Riley 6'; Clegg 18' (pen.); Jale 84'	Report	Caspers 77'	Stadium: Jerry Collins Stadium; Attendance: 1,002; Referee: Caitlin Williams

21 November 2026 6	Sydney FC	v	Canberra United	Sydney
14:00		Report		Stadium: Sydney Olympic Park Athletic Centre

11 December 2026 7	Adelaide United	v	Sydney FC	Adelaide
16:20 ACDT		Report		Stadium: Coopers Stadium

20 December 2026 8	Sydney FC	v	Central Coast Mariners	Wollongong
17:00 AEDT		Report		Stadium: WIN Stadium

27 December 2026 9	Melbourne City	v	Sydney FC	Melbourne
TBD AEDT		Report		Stadium: AAMI Park

2 January 2027 10	Sydney FC	v	Brisbane Roar	Sydney
16:50 AEDT		Report		Stadium: Allianz Stadium

10 January 2027 11	Perth Glory	v	Sydney FC	Perth
17:00 AWST		Report		Stadium: Sam Kerr Football Centre

15 January 2027 12	Sydney FC	–	Newcastle Jets	Sydney
16:50 AEDT		Report		Stadium: Allianz Stadium

23 January 2027 13	Sydney FC	v	Melbourne Victory	TBD
17:00 AEDT		Report		Stadium: TBD

30 January 2027 14	Western Sydney Wanderers	v	Sydney FC	Sydney
16:50 AEDT		Report		Stadium: CommBank Stadium

13 February 2027 16	Canberra United	v	Sydney FC	Canberra
14:00 AEDT		Report		Stadium: McKellar Park

20 February 2027 17	Sydney FC	v	Wellington Phoenix	TBD
17:00 AEDT				Stadium: TBD

12 March 2027 18	Central Coast Mariners	v	Sydney FC	Gosford
19:00 AEDT		Report		Stadium: Polytec Stadium

20 March 2027 19	Newcastle Jets	–	Sydney FC	Newcastle
14:15 AEDT		Report		Stadium: McDonald Jones Stadium

27 March 2027 20	Sydney FC	v	Perth Glory	Wollongong
17:00 AEDT		Report		Stadium: WIN Stadium

4 April 2027 21	Sydney FC	v	Western Sydney Wanderers	Wollongong
14:00 AEDT		Report		Stadium: WIN Stadium

10 April 2027 22	Melbourne Victory	v	Sydney FC	Melbourne
18:00 AEDT		Report		Stadium: AAMI Stadium

== See also ==
- 2026–27 Sydney FC season
