= 2024 A-League Women grand final =

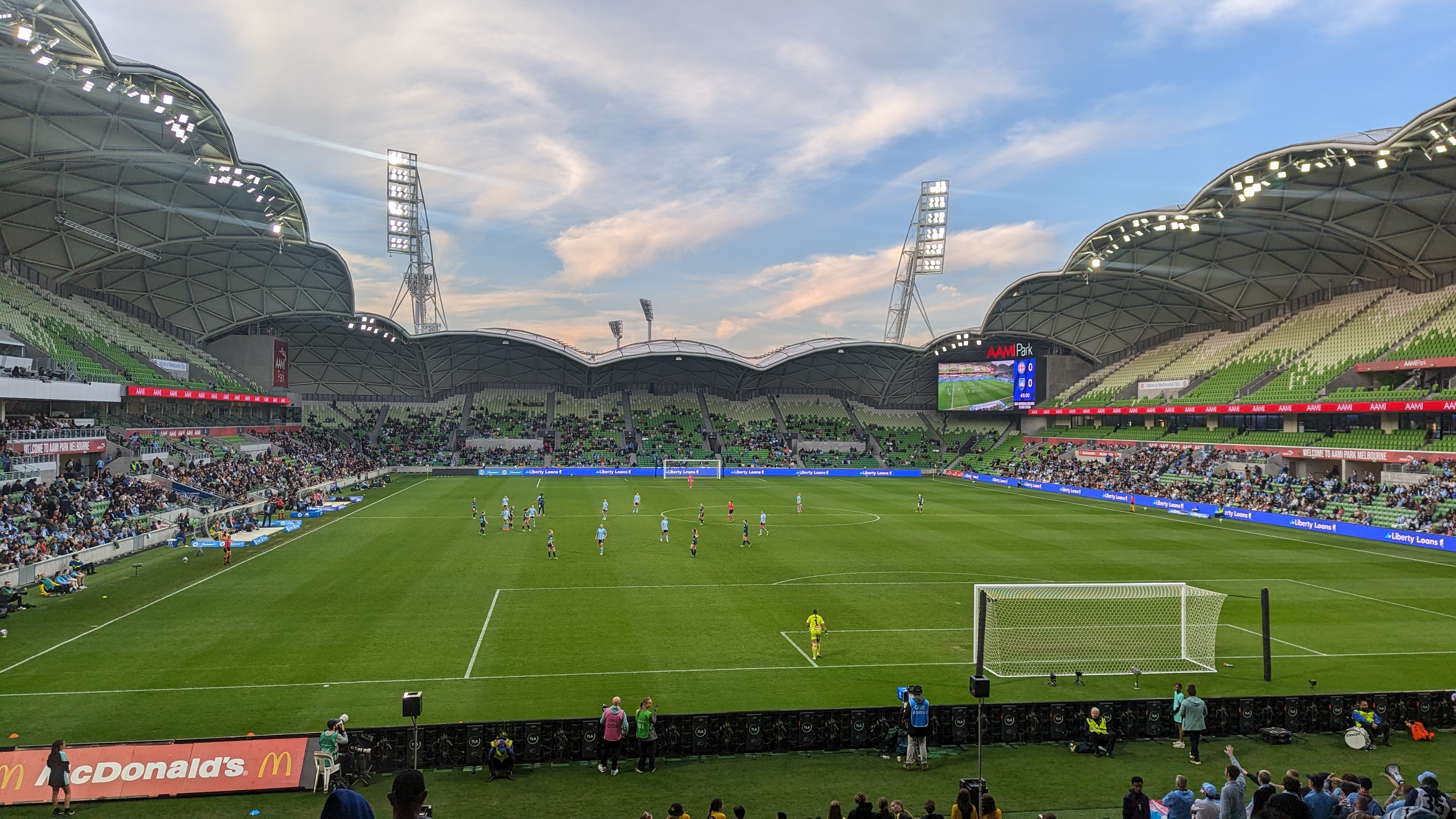
- AAMI Park in Melbourne hosted the Grand Final.
- Event: 2023–24 A-League Women
Melbourne City	Sydney FC
0	1
- Date: 4 May 2024
- Venue: AAMI Park, Melbourne
- Man of the Match: Mackenzie Hawkesby (Sydney FC)
- Referee: Casey Reibelt (Queensland)
- Attendance: 7,671

The 2024 A-League Women grand final, known officially as the Liberty A-League Women grand final, was a championship soccer match between Melbourne City and Sydney FC at AAMI Park in Melbourne on 4 May 2024. It was the 15th A-League Women grand final and the culmination of the 2023–24 season. Melbourne City came into the match as premiers.

The match was refereed by Casey Reibelt. Sydney FC won the match 1–0 and received its second-consecutive championship, the tenth league title in the club's history. Mackenzie Hawkesby was named man of the match. As winners, Sydney FC became the first A-League Women club to win five championships.

The match was broadcast live in Australia and New Zealand by Network 10 and Sky Sport respectively, as well as 10 Bold and Paramount+. 7,671 spectators were in attendance at the venue, the second-highest at a grand final behind the 2023 grand final.

== Teams ==
Team	Previous grand final appearances (bold indicates winners)
Melbourne City	4 (**2016**, **2017**, **2018**, **2020**)
Sydney FC	10 (**2009 (Dec.)**, 2011, **2013**, 2016, 2018, **2019**, 2020, 2021, 2022, **2023**)

== Route to the final ==
=== Melbourne City ===
Round	Melbourne City	
Regular season	**1st placed / Premiers**: Pos / Team / Pld / Pts; **1** / Melbourne City / **22** / **41**; 2 / Sydney FC (C) / 22 / **39**; 3 / Western United / 22 / **36**; 4 / Melbourne Victory / 22 / **36**; 5 / Central Coast Mariners / 22 / **35**; Source: A-Leagues (C) Champions	
Semi-finals	Opponent	Score
Semi-finals	Newcastle Jets	6–0 (agg.)

=== Sydney FC ===
Round	Sydney FC	
Regular season	**2nd placed**: Pos / Team / Pld / Pts; 1 / Melbourne City / 22 / **41**; **2** / Sydney FC (C) / **22** / **39**; 3 / Western United / 22 / **36**; 4 / Melbourne Victory / 22 / **36**; 5 / Central Coast Mariners / 22 / **35**; Source: A-Leagues (C) Champions	
Semi-finals	Opponent	Score
Semi-finals	Central Coast Mariners	2–1 (agg.)

== Match ==
=== Details ===
4 May 2024
16:15 AEST (UTC+10:00)

Melbourne City	0–1	Sydney FC
	Report	Connors 69'

AAMI Park, Melbourne
Attendance: 7,671
Referee: Casey Reibelt

**Melbourne City**	**Sydney FC**

GK	23	(Australia) Melissa Barbieri
RB	22	(Australia) Bryleeh Henry
CB	5	(United States) Taylor Otto
CB	13	(New Zealand) Rebekah Stott
LB	7	(United States) Julia Grosso		(yellow card) 28'
DM	24	(Australia) Daniela Galic
DM	14	(Australia) Laura Hughes
AM	18	(Australia) Leah Davidson	(substituted off) 87'
AM	17	(New Zealand) Hannah Wilkinson	(substituted off) 78'
AM	10	(Australia) Rhianna Pollicina
CF	11	(Bosnia and Herzegovina) Emina Ekic
Substitutes:
GK	30	(Australia) Emily Shields
DF	3	(Australia) Naomi Chinnama
DF	19	(Australia) Tijan McKenna
MF	6	(Australia) Leticia McKenna	(substituted on) 78'
FW	20	(Australia) Caitlin Karic	(substituted on) 87'
Head coach:
(Australia) Dario Vidošić

GK	1	(Australia) Jada Whyman
RB	4	(Australia) Tori Tumeth
CB	3	(Australia) Charlotte Mclean
CB	16	(United States) Jordan Thompson
LB	14	(Australia) Abbey Lemon
RM	11	(Australia) Cortnee Vine
CM	15	(Australia) Mackenzie Hawkesby
DM	2	(Australia) Margaux Chauvet
CM	21	(Australia) Shay Hollman
LM	22	(Australia) Indiana Dos Santos
CF	20	(Australia) Princess Ibini-Isei
Substitutes:
GK	30	(Australia) Tahlia Franco
MF	6	(Australia) Lucy Johnson
MF	18	(Australia) Taylor Ray
FW	9	(United States) Shea Connors
FW	24	(Australia) Caley Tallon-Henniker
Head coach:
(Australia) Ante Juric

Assistant referees:
Emma Kocbek
Maggie Price
Fourth official:
Georgia Ghirardello

**Match rules**

- 90 minutes.
- 30 minutes of extra time if necessary.
- Penalty shoot-out if scores still level.
- Five named substitutes.
- Maximum of four substitutions, with a fifth allowed in extra time.

== See also ==
- 2023–24 A-League Women
- 2023–24 Melbourne City FC (A-League Women) season
- 2023–24 Sydney FC (A-League Women) season
