= 2020–21 Western Sydney Wanderers FC (women) season =

9th season in existence of Western Sydney Wanderers (women)

Western Sydney Wanderers (women)
2020–21 season
- Owner: Paul Lederer, Jefferson Cheng, Glenn Duncan, David Slade
- Chairman: Paul Lederer
- Head Coach: Dean Heffernan
- Stadium: Marconi Stadium; Wanderers Centre of Football
- W-League: 6th
- W-League Finals: DNQ
- Top goalscorer: Rosie Galea (4)
- Highest home attendance: 3,027 vs. Sydney FC (30 December 2020); W-League
- Lowest home attendance: 279 vs. Newcastle Jets (2 January 2021); W-League
- Average home league attendance: 827
- Biggest win: 4–0 vs. Melbourne City (A) (11 March 2021); W-League
- Biggest defeat: 0–3 vs. Sydney FC (H) (30 December 2020); W-League; 1–4 vs. Newcastle Jets (A) (23 January 2021); W-League; 0–3 vs. Canberra United (A) (30 January 2021); W-League
| Home colours | Away colours |

The 2020–21 season was Western Sydney Wanderers Football Club (women)'s ninth season in the W-League. Western Sydney Wanderers finished 6th their W-League season.

== Players ==
Note: Flags indicate national team as defined under FIFA eligibility rules; some limited exceptions apply. Players may hold more than one non-FIFA nationality.

| No. | Pos. | Nation | Player |
|---|---|---|---|
| 1 | GK | AUS | Sarah Willacy |
| 2 | DF | AUS | Caitlin Cooper |
| 3 | DF | AUS | Nikola Orgill |
| 4 | MF | AUS | Margaux Chauvet |
| 5 | DF | AUS | Courtney Nevin |
| 6 | MF | AUS | Olivia Price |
| 7 | MF | AUS | Chloe Middleton |
| 8 | FW | AUS | Erica Halloway |
| 9 | FW | AUS | Bryleeh Henry |
| 10 | MF | AUS | Libby Copus-Brown |

| No. | Pos. | Nation | Player |
|---|---|---|---|
| 11 | DF | AUS | Danika Matos |
| 12 | FW | IRL | Julie-Ann Russell |
| 13 | DF | AUS | Georgia Yeoman-Dale |
| 14 | MF | AUS | Aideen Keane |
| 15 | MF | AUS | Rosie Galea |
| 16 | MF | AUS | Isabel Gomez |
| 18 | MF | AUS | Sarah Hunter |
| 19 | FW | AUS | Leena Khamis |
| 20 | GK | AUS | Courtney Newbon |
| 25 | MF | AUS | Teigan Collister |

== Transfers and contracts ==
=== Transfers in ===
| No. | Position | Player | Transferred from | Type/fee | Date | Ref. |
|---|---|---|---|---|---|---|
| 6 | MF | Olivia Price | Canberra United | Free transfer | 3 September 2020 | |
| 13 | DF | Georgia Yeoman-Dale | Unattached | Free transfer | 4 September 2020 | |
| 1 | GK | Sarah Willacy | Unattached | Free transfer | 29 September 2020 | |
| 25 | MF | Teigan Collister | Newcastle Jets | Free transfer | 7 October 2020 | |
| 19 | FW | Leena Khamis | Canberra United | Free transfer | 27 October 2020 | |
| 10 | MF | Libby Copus-Brown | Newcastle Jets | Free transfer | 5 November 2020 | |
| 4 | MF | Margaux Chauvet | (Australia) Illawarra Stingrays | Free transfer | 19 November 2020 | |
| 3 | DF | Nikola Orgill | (Norway) Kolbotn | Free transfer | 26 November 2020 | |
| 9 | FW | Bryleeh Henry | (Australia) Football NSW | Free transfer | 16 December 2020 | |
| 14 | MF | Aideen Keane | (Australia) Football NSW | Free transfer | 18 December 2020 | |
| 16 | FW | Isabel Gomez | (Australia) Football NSW | Free transfer | 18 December 2020 | |
| 18 | MF | Sarah Huter | (Australia) Football NSW | Free transfer | 18 December 2020 | |
| 12 | FW | (Republic of Ireland) Julie-Ann Russell | (Australia) Sydney University | Free transfer | 21 December 2020 | |

=== Transfers out ===
| No. | Position | Player | Transferred to | Type/fee | Date | Ref. |
|---|---|---|---|---|---|---|
| 3 | DF | (United States) Sam Staab | (United States) Washington Spirit | Loan return | 9 March 2020 | |
| 7 | MF | Amy Harrison | (Netherlands) PSV | Free transfer | 14 April 2020 | |
| 21 | MF | Ella Mastrantonio | (England) Bristol City | Free transfer | 30 June 2020 | |
| 1 | GK | (United States) Abby Smith | (United States) Utah Royals | Free transfer | 14 July 2020 | |
| 23 | FW | (United States) Kristen Hamilton | (United States) North Carolina Courage | Free transfer | 29 July 2020 | |
| 11 | FW | Cortnee Vine | Sydney FC | Free transfer | 13 August 2020 | |
| — | MF | Rachel Lowe | Sydney FC | Free transfer | 13 August 2020 | |
| — | GK | Jada Whyman | Sydney FC | Free transfer | 13 August 2020 | |
| 15 | DF | Alexandra Huynh | (Italy) Napoli | Free transfer | 2 October 2020 | |
| 10 | MF | Kyra Cooney-Cross | Melbourne Victory | Free transfer | 2 December 2020 | |
| 17 | DF | Tiana Jaber | Newcastle Jets | Free transfer | 18 December 2020 | |
| 2 | FW | Alix Roberts | Unattached | Free transfer | 29 December 2020 | |
| 16 | MF | Liana Danaskos | Unattached | Free transfer | 29 December 2020 | |

=== Contract extensions ===
| No. | Position | Player | Duration | Date | Ref. |
|---|---|---|---|---|---|
| 2 | DF | Caitlin Cooper | 1 year | 2 September 2020 | |
| 5 | DF | Courtney Nevin | 1 year | 4 September 2020 | |
| 19 | FW | Susan Phonsongkham | 1 year | 4 September 2020 | |
| 7 | MF | Chloe Middleton | 1 year | 5 September 2020 | |
| 11 | DF | Danika Matos | 1 year | 5 September 2020 | |
| 20 | GK | Courtney Newbon | 1 year | 11 September 2020 | |
| 15 | MF | Rosie Galea | 1 year | 6 October 2020 | |
| 8 | FW | Erica Halloway | 1 year | 10 February 2021 | |

== Competitions ==
=== Overall record ===
| Competition | First match | Last match | Starting round | Final position | Record | | | | | | | |
| Competition | First match | Last match | Starting round | Final position | Pld | W | D | L | GF | GA | GD | Win % |
|---|---|---|---|---|---|---|---|---|---|---|---|---|
| W-League | 30 December 2020 | 21 March 2021 | Matchday 1 | 6th | 12 | 4 | 1 | 7 | 13 | 21 | −8 | 33.33 |
| Total | | | | | 12 | 4 | 1 | 7 | 13 | 21 | −8 | 33.33 |

Source: Competitions

=== W-League ===
==== League table ====
| Pos | Team | Pld | W | D | L | GF | GA | GD | Pts | Qualification |
|---|---|---|---|---|---|---|---|---|---|---|
| 1 | Sydney FC | 12 | 9 | 1 | 2 | 26 | 11 | +15 | 28 | Qualification to Finals series |
| 2 | Brisbane Roar | 12 | 7 | 4 | 1 | 29 | 12 | +17 | 25 | Qualification to Finals series |
| 3 | Melbourne Victory (C) | 12 | 7 | 2 | 3 | 25 | 14 | +11 | 23 | Qualification to Finals series |
| 4 | Canberra United | 12 | 6 | 4 | 2 | 21 | 16 | +5 | 22 | Qualification to Finals series |
| 5 | Adelaide United | 12 | 7 | 1 | 4 | 22 | 18 | +4 | 22 | |
| 6 | Western Sydney Wanderers | 12 | 4 | 1 | 7 | 13 | 21 | −8 | 13 | |
| 7 | Melbourne City | 12 | 4 | 1 | 7 | 11 | 23 | −12 | 13 | |
| 8 | Newcastle Jets | 12 | 2 | 1 | 9 | 14 | 21 | −7 | 7 | |
| 9 | Perth Glory | 12 | 0 | 1 | 11 | 7 | 32 | −25 | 1 | |

Source: A-Leagues
Rules for classification: 1) points; 2) goal difference; 3) number of goals scored.
(C) Champions

==== Results summary ====
| Overall | | | | | | | | Home | | | | | | Away | | | | | |
| Pld | W | D | L | GF | GA | GD | Pts | W | D | L | GF | GA | GD | W | D | L | GF | GA | GD |
|---|---|---|---|---|---|---|---|---|---|---|---|---|---|---|---|---|---|---|---|
| 12 | 4 | 1 | 7 | 13 | 21 | −8 | 13 | 3 | 1 | 2 | 7 | 8 | −1 | 1 | 0 | 5 | 6 | 13 | −7 |

Source: worldfootball.net

==== Results by round ====
| Round | 10 | 5 | 4 | 11 | 9 | 8 | 8 | 14 | 10 | 11 | 2 | 9 |
|---|---|---|---|---|---|---|---|---|---|---|---|---|
| Ground | H | H | A | A | A | H | H | H | H | A | A | A |
| Result | L | W | L | L | L | D | L | W | W | L | W | L |
| Position | 9 | 3 | 6 | 8 | 8 | 8 | 8 | 6 | 6 | 6 | 6 | 6 |
| Points | 0 | 3 | 3 | 3 | 3 | 4 | 4 | 7 | 10 | 10 | 13 | 13 |

Source: A-Leagues
A = Away; H = Home; W = Win; D = Draw; L = Loss

==== Matches ====
The league fixtures were announced on 30 November 2020.

Win Draw Loss

| 30 December 2020 10 | Western Sydney Wanderers | 0–3 | Sydney FC | Sydney |
| 16:35 AEDT | | Report | Vine 27'; Ibini-Isei 60', 86' | Stadium: Bankwest Stadium; Attendance: 3,027; Referee: Kelly Jones |
Note: Match originally scheduled for 28 February at Marconi Stadium, but rescheduled for 27 December at Bankwest Stadium due to other fixture arrangements. Match then rescheduled for 30 December.

| 2 January 2021 5 | Western Sydney Wanderers | 2–1 | Newcastle Jets | Sydney |
| 19:05 AEDT | Galea 21', 52' | Report | Andrews 46' | Stadium: Wanderers Centre of Football; Attendance: 279; Referee: Kelly Jones |
Note: Match originally scheduled for 24 January at Bankwest Stadium, but rescheduled for 2 January at Wanderers Centre of Football due to other fixture arrangements.

| 16 January 2021 4 | Sydney FC | 2–0 | Western Sydney Wanderers | Sydney |
| 19:05 AEDT | Hawkesby 31' (pen.); Brush 66' | Report | | Stadium: ANZ Stadium; Attendance: 2,500; Referee: Kelly Jones |

| 23 January 2021 11 | Newcastle Jets | 4–1 | Western Sydney Wanderers | Newcastle |
| 16:05 AEDT | Allan 8', 33'; Andrews 44'; Simon 53' | Report | Yeoman-Dale 11' | Stadium: No.2 Sportsground; Attendance: 657; Referee: Casey Reibelt |
Note: Match originally scheduled for 7 March at McDonald Jones Stadium, but rescheduled for 23 January at No.2 Sportsground due to other fixture arrangements.

| 30 January 2021 9 | Canberra United | 3–0 | Western Sydney Wanderers | Canberra |
| 17:05 AEDT | Heyman 3', 34'; Yeoman-Dale 41' (o.g.) | Report | | Stadium: Viking Park; Attendance: 1,049; Referee: Lara Lee |
Note: Match originally scheduled for 21 March, but postponed as a restarted fixture draw due to affected and unknown travel restrictions in future. It was rescheduled for 20 February. Match then rescheduled for 30 January.

| 7 February 2021 8 | Western Sydney Wanderers | 2–2 | Adelaide United | Sydney |
| 16:05 AEDT | Hunter 43', 78' | Report | Dawber 33', 71' | Stadium: Marconi Stadium; Attendance: 415; Referee: Rebecca Durcau |
Note: Match not originally set in fixture draw, but added as a restarted fixture draw due to affected and unknown travel restrictions in future.

| 11 February 2021 8 | Western Sydney Wanderers | 1–2 | Brisbane Roar | Sydney |
| 19:05 AEDT | Khamis 14' | Report | Gielnik 16', 32' (pen.) | Stadium: Marconi Stadium; Attendance: 494; Referee: Casey Reibelt |
Note: Match not originally set in fixture draw, but added as a restarted fixture draw due to affected and unknown travel restrictions in future.

| 18 February 2021 14 | Western Sydney Wanderers | 1–0 | Perth Glory | Sydney |
| 19:10 AEDT | Russell 45' | Report | | Stadium: Marconi Stadium; Attendance: 314; Referee: Rachael Mitchenson |
Note: Match originally scheduled for 27 March at Wanderers Centre of Football, but postponed as a restarted fixture draw due to affected and unknown travel restrictions in future. It was rescheduled for 18 February at Marconi Stadium

| 25 February 2021 10 | Western Sydney Wanderers | 1–0 | Melbourne City | Sydney |
| 19:05 AEDT | Khamis 72' | Report | | Stadium: Wanderers Centre of Football; Attendance: 334; Referee: Isabella Blaess |
Note: Match originally scheduled for 11 February at Marconi Stadium, but postponed as a restarted fixture draw due to affected and unknown travel restrictions in future. It was rescheduled for 25 February at Wanderers Centre of Football.

| 4 March 2021 11 | Melbourne Victory | 1–0 | Western Sydney Wanderers | Melbourne |
| 19:05 AEDT | Longo 43' | Report | | Stadium: AAMI Park; Attendance: 0 (behind closed doors); Referee: Georgia Ghirardello |
Note: Match not originally set in fixture draw, but added as a restarted fixture draw due to affected and unknown travel restrictions in future.

| 11 March 2021 2 | Melbourne City | 0–4 | Western Sydney Wanderers | Melbourne |
| 19:05 AEDT | | Report | Henry 12', 26'; Galea 82', 90+3' | Stadium: Frank Holohan Soccer Complex; Attendance: 547; Referee: Casey Reibelt |
Note: Match originally scheduled for 2 January, but postponed as a restarted fixture draw due to affected and unknown travel restrictions in future. It was rescheduled for 11 March.

| 21 March 2021 9 | Adelaide United | 3–1 | Western Sydney Wanderers | Adelaide |
| 15:35 ACDT | I. Hodgson 18'; Waldus 50'; Worts 63' | Report | Price 4' | Stadium: Marden Sports Complex; Attendance: 5,159; Referee: Lara Lee |
Note: Match originally scheduled for 20 February at Marden Sports Complex, but postponed as a restarted fixture draw due to affected and unknown travel restrictions in future. It was rescheduled for 21 March at Coopers Stadium.
