= 2024–25 Canberra United FC (women) season =

17th season in existence of Canberra United FC

Canberra United
2024–25 season
- Chairman: Kate Lundy
- Manager: Antoni Jagarinec
- Stadium: McKellar Park
- A-League Women: 5th
- A-League Women Finals: Elimination-final
- Top goalscorer: League: Michelle Heyman (7); All: Michelle Heyman (8)
- Highest home attendance: 1,249 vs. Adelaide United (16 November 2024); A-League Women
- Lowest home attendance: 1,180 vs. Brisbane Roar (2 November 2024); A-League Women
- Average home league attendance: 1,215
- Biggest win: 3–2 vs. Brisbane Roar (H) (2 November 2024); A-League Women; 1–0 vs. Wellington Phoenix (A) (10 November 2024); A-League Women
- Biggest defeat: 0–2 vs. Adelaide United (H) (16 November 2024); A-League Women
- All statistics correct as of 30 November 2024.

The 2024–25 season was Canberra United Football Club's 17th season in the A-League Women.

== Players ==
=== First-team squad ===
As of 26 March 2025

Note: Flags indicate national team as defined under FIFA eligibility rules; some limited exceptions apply. Players may hold more than one non-FIFA nationality.

No.	Pos.	Nation	Player
1	GK	AUS	Sally James
2	DF	AUS	Alex McKenzie
4	MF	AUS	Holly Murray
5	DF	PHI	Madison Ayson
6	DF	AUS	Ivana Galic (scholarship)
7	FW	AUS	Jynaya dos Santos
8	MF	AUS	Tianah Miro (scholarship)
9	FW	NZL	Ruby Nathan
10	MF	AUS	Mary Stanic-Floody
11	MF	AUS	Emma Robers
12	FW	AUS	Hayley Taylor-Young
13	FW	AUS	Sofia Christopherson

No.	Pos.	Nation	Player
17	FW	AUS	Maja Markovski
18	GK	AUS	Coco Majstorovic
19	MF	AUS	Jaya Bowman (scholarship)
20	FW	AUS	Lillian Skelly (scholarship)
21	FW	AUS	Aideen Keane
23	FW	AUS	Michelle Heyman (captain)
24	GK	AUS	Georgia Ritchie
25	MF	AUS	Darcey Malone
26	GK	AUS	Janet King (scholarship)
28	DF	AUS	Tegan Bertolissio
32	MF	AUS	Bethany Gordon

== Transfers ==
=== Transfers in ===
No.	Position	Player	From	Type/fee	Contract length	Date	Ref
1	GK	Sally James	Perth Glory	Free transfer	1 year	23 August 2024	
3	DF	(New Zealand) Elizabeth Anton	Perth Glory	Free transfer	1 year	9 September 2024	
21	FW	Aideen Keane	Unattached	Free transfer	1 year	13 September 2024	
7	FW	Jynaya dos Santos	Sydney FC	Free transfer	1 year	16 September 2024	
25	MF	Darcey Malone	Unattached	Free transfer	1 year	20 September 2024	
32	MF	Bethany Gordon	Western Sydney Wanderers	Free transfer	1 year	23 September 2024	
17	FW	Maja Markovski	(Australia) Bulleen Lions	Free transfer	1 year	24 September 2024	
11	MF	Emma Robers	Unattached	Free transfer	1 year	25 September 2024	
19	MF	Jaya Bowman	(Australia) Canberra Olympic	Scholarship	1 year	14 October 2024	
6	DF	Ivana Galic	(Australia) O'Connor Knights	Scholarship	1 year	29 October 2024	
26	GK	Janet King	(Australia) Canberra Olympic	Scholarship	1 year	29 October 2024	
8	MF	Tianah Miro	(Australia) Canberra Olympic	Scholarship	1 year	29 October 2024	
5	DF	(Philippines) Madison Ayson	(United States) Houston Dash	Free transfer	1 year	29 November 2024	

=== Transfers out ===
No.	Position	Player	Transferred to	Type/fee	Date	Ref
17	MF	(Serbia) Vesna Milivojević	(Sweden) Norrköping	End of contract	2 April 2024	
3	MF	(United States) Sarah Clark	(United States) Spokane Zephyr	End of contract	28 May 2024	
1	GK	Chloe Lincoln	Western United	End of contract	31 May 2024	
8	MF	Sasha Grove	Western United	End of contract	5 June 2024	
22	DF	(United States) Cannon Clough	(United States) Carolina Ascent	End of contract	12 June 2024	
14	DF	Maia Cameron	Unattached	End of contract	30 June 2024	
16	FW	Madelyn Whittall	Unattached	End of contract	1 July 2024	
5	DF	Emma Ilijoski	(Scotland) Heart of Midlothian	End of contract	29 July 2024	
19	FW	Nickoletta Flannery	Melbourne Victory	End of contract	30 July 2024	
6	DF	Ava Piazza	Newcastle Jets	End of contract	17 September 2024	
11	FW	(New Zealand) Deven Jackson	Newcastle Jets	End of contract	23 September 2024	
15	MF	Hannah McNulty	Unattached	End of contract	October 2024	
3	DF	(New Zealand) Elizabeth Anton	(Norway) Kolbotn	Mutual contract termination	26 March 2025	

=== Contract extensions ===
No.	Player	Position	Duration	Date	Ref.
18	Coco Majstorovic	Goalkeeper	1 year	24 August 2024	
24	Georgia Ritchie	Goalkeeper	1 year	26 August 2024	
9	(New Zealand) Ruby Nathan	Forward	1 year	28 August 2024	
12	Hayley Taylor-Young	Forward	1 year	30 August 2024	
13	Sofia Christopherson	Forward	1 year	2 September 2024	
23	Michelle Heyman	Forward	1 year	4 September 2024	
4	Holly Murray	Midfielder	1 year	6 September 2024	
10	Mary Stanic-Floody	Midfielder	1 year	11 September 2024	
28	Tegan Bertolissio	Defender	1 year	18 September 2024	
2	Alex McKenzie	Defender	1 year	22 September 2024	
20	Lillian Skelly	Forward	1 year (scholarship)	1 October 2024	

== Pre-season and friendlies ==
12 October 2024	Canberra United (Australia)	6–0	(Australia) NPLW All-Stars	Canberra, Australia
15:00 AEDT	Heyman 18', 25'; Markovski 65', 85'; Nathan 67'; Stanic-Floody 89'	Report		Stadium: McKellar Park; Attendance: 800+

25 October 2024	Melbourne Victory (Australia)	0–0	(Australia) Canberra United	Albury, Australia
18:20 AEDT		Report		Stadium: Lavington Sports Ground

== Competitions ==
=== Overall record ===
Competition	First match	Last match	Final position	Record							
Competition	First match	Last match	Final position	Pld	W	D	L	GF	GA	GD	Win %
A-League Women	2 November 2024	20 April 2025	5th	23	9	6	8	28	31	−3	39.13
A-League Women Finals	28 April 2025	28 April 2025	Elimination-final	1	0	0	1	1	2	−1	0.00
Total				24	9	6	9	29	33	−4	37.50

Last updated: 28 April 2025
Source: Competitions

=== A-League Women ===
==== League table ====
Pos	Team	Pld	W	D	L	GF	GA	GD	Pts	Qualification
3	Adelaide United	23	14	3	6	44	30	+14	45	Qualification for Finals series
4	Central Coast Mariners (C)	23	9	7	7	31	25	+6	34	Qualification for Finals series
5	Canberra United	23	9	6	8	28	31	−3	33	Qualification for Finals series
6	Western United	23	9	6	8	39	46	−7	33	Qualification for Finals series
7	Brisbane Roar	23	8	2	13	46	42	+4	26	

Source: A-Leagues
Rules for classification: 1) points; 2) goal difference; 3) goals scored; 4) wins; 5) head-to-head results; 5a) head-to-head points; 5b) head-to-head goal difference; 6) Fair Play points; 7) away goal difference; 8) away goals per match; 9) home goal difference; 10) home goals per match; 11) toss of a coin in an event of a tie of two clubs.
(C) Champions

==== Results summary ====
Overall								Home						Away					
Pld	W	D	L	GF	GA	GD	Pts	W	D	L	GF	GA	GD	W	D	L	GF	GA	GD
23	9	6	8	28	31	−3	33	5	4	3	11	11	0	4	2	5	17	20	−3

Last updated: 19 April 2025.
Source: Soccerway
Home figures include Canberra United's 1–1 draw on neutral ground against Perth Glory on 24 November 2024.

==== Results by round ====
Round	1	2	3	4	5	6	7	8	10	11	12	9	13	14	15	16	17	18	19	20	21	22	23
Ground	H	A	H	N	A	A	H	H	A	H	A	H	A	H	H	A	H	A	A	H	A	H	A
Result	W	W	L	D	L	L	L	D	W	W	W	L	D	W	D	D	D	L	L	L	W	W	W
Position	5	2	5	4	7	9	10	10	8	7	7	7	8	7	7	7	7	7	7	7	6	6	5
Points	3	6	6	7	7	7	7	8	11	14	17	17	18	21	22	23	24	24	24	24	27	30	33

Updated to match(es) played on 20 April 2025. Source: Soccerway
A = Away; H = Home; N = Neutral; W = Win; D = Draw; L = Loss

==== Matches ====
Win Draw Loss

All times are in local time (AEST/AEDT).

2 November 2024 1	Canberra United	3–2	Brisbane Roar	Canberra
16:00	Markovski 15', 56'; Stanic-Floody 31'	Report	Popadinova 50'; De la Harpe 89'	Stadium: McKellar Park; Attendance: 1,180; Referee: Rachael Mitchenson

10 November 2024 2	Wellington Phoenix	0–1	Canberra United	Wellington
14:00		Report	Heyman 11'	Stadium: Porirua Park; Attendance: 645; Referee: Beth Rattray

16 November 2024 3	Canberra United	0–2	Adelaide United	Canberra
16:00		Report	Condon 11'; Worts 35'	Stadium: McKellar Park; Attendance: 1,249; Referee: Rebecca Durcau

24 November 2024 4	Canberra United	1–1	Perth Glory	Sydney
13:30	Stanic-Floody 69'	Report	Dalton 41'	Stadium: Netstrata Jubilee Stadium (Note: Match moved from Leichhardt Oval following a pitch assessment.); Attendance: 1,237; Referee: Beth Rattray

30 November 2024 5	Central Coast Mariners	2–1	Canberra United	Gosford
16:00	Fuller 62'; Evans 68'	Report	Markovski 38'	Stadium: Industree Group Stadium; Attendance: 723; Referee: Mikayla Ryan

15 December 2024 6	Melbourne City	4–2	Canberra United	Melbourne
19:45	Harvey 48'; Markovski 61' (o.g.); Hughes 77'; McKenna 90+3'	Report	Heyman 12', 89'	Stadium: AAMI Park; Attendance: 926; Referee: Bec Mackie

21 December 2024 7	Canberra United	0–2	Melbourne Victory	Canberra
17:00		Report	Flannery 4'; D'Appolonia 46'	Stadium: McKellar Park; Attendance: 1,212; Referee: Rebecca Durcau

29 December 2024 8	Canberra United	0–0	Newcastle Jets	Canberra
17:00		Report		Stadium: McKellar Park; Attendance: 1,188; Referee: Molly Godsell

4 January 2025 10	Brisbane Roar	1–2	Canberra United	Brisbane
18:00	L. Freier 72'	Report	Robers 81'; Heyman 88'	Stadium: Perry Park; Attendance: 3,612; Referee: Rebecca Durcau

11 January 2025 11	Canberra United	2–1	Western United	Canberra
17:00	Mihocic 21' (o.g.); Christopherson 50'	Report	Zimmerman 15'	Stadium: McKellar Park; Attendance: 1,766; Referee: Rebecca Durcau

15 January 2025 9	Sydney FC	2–0 (Note: The match was abandoned due to lightning in the 54th minute with Sydney FC leading 2–0. The APL upheld the result.)	Canberra United	Sydney
19:00	Ibini 18'; Johnson 38'	Report		Stadium: Leichhardt Oval; Referee: Kelly Jones

18 January 2025 12	Canberra United	1–0	Western Sydney Wanderers	Canberra
17:00	Khamis 45' (o.g.)	Report		Stadium: McKellar Park; Attendance: 1,468; Referee: Mikayla Ryan

25 January 2025 13	Newcastle Jets	2–2	Canberra United	Newcastle
19:45	Gooch 10'; Gallagher 71'	Report	Wilson 24' (o.g.); Heyman 29'	Stadium: McDonald Jones Stadium; Attendance: 3,264; Referee: Caitlin Williams

1 February 2025 14	Canberra United	1–0	Perth Glory	Canberra
17:00	Anton 56'	Report		Stadium: McKellar Park; Attendance: 1,807; Referee: Georgia Ghirardello

8 February 2025 15	Canberra United	1–1	Central Coast Mariners	Canberra
17:00	Heyman 46'	Report	Pennock 39'	Stadium: McKellar Park; Attendance: 1,376; Referee: Caitlin Williams

15 February 2025 16	Adelaide United	1–1	Canberra United	Adelaide
16:50	Dawber 73'	Report	Malone 45'	Stadium: Coopers Stadium; Attendance: 2,984; Referee: Mikayla Ryan

1 March 2025 17	Canberra United	1–1	Melbourne City	Canberra
16:00	Keane 81'	Report	Otto 52'	Stadium: McKellar Park; Attendance: 919; Referee: Rachael Mitchenson

9 March 2025 18	Melbourne Victory	2–0	Canberra United	Melbourne
17:00	Furphy 70'; Gielnik 83'	Report		Stadium: The Home of the Matildas; Attendance: 839; Referee: Bec Mackie

14 March 2025 19	Western United	4–3	Canberra United	Melbourne
19:00	Hieda 50'; Zimmerman 63'; Ibarguen 82'; Ayson 89' (o.g.)	Report	Gordon 12'; Ayson 53'; Stanic-Floody 65'	Stadium: Ironbark Fields; Attendance: 503; Referee: Caitlin Williams

22 March 2025 20	Canberra United	0–1	Sydney FC	Canberra
16:00		Report	Hawkesby 78'	Stadium: McKellar Park; Attendance: 2,194; Referee: Rachael Mitchenson

29 March 2025 21	Perth Glory	1–2	Canberra United	Perth
20:00	McKenna 60'	Report	Heyman 16'; Stanic-Floody 21' (pen.)	Stadium: Sam Kerr Football Centre; Attendance: 896; Referee: Molly Godsell

13 April 2025 22	Canberra United	1–0	Wellington Phoenix	Canberra
15:00	Ayson 25'	Report		Stadium: McKellar Park; Attendance: 1,873; Referee: Rachael Mitchenson

19 April 2025 23	Western Sydney Wanderers	1–3	Canberra United	Sydney
16:50	Trew 64'	Report	Malone 25'; Gordon 50'; Nathan 78'	Stadium: CommBank Stadium; Attendance: 2,958; Referee: Kelly Jones
Note: Was originally scheduled to take place on 20 April at Wanderers Football Park, but due to other changes was rescheduled for 19 April at CommBank Stadium.

==== Finals series ====
28 April 2025 (Note: Originally scheduled for 27 April, this match was postponed and rescheduled due to a waterlogged pitch.) Elimination-final	Central Coast Mariners	2–1	Canberra United	Gosford
18:00 AEST	Pennock 46', 74'	Report	Heyman 43'	Stadium: Industree Group Stadium; Attendance: 1,502; Referee: Izzy Cooper

== Statistics ==
=== Appearances and goals ===
Includes all competitions. Players with no appearances not included in the list.

As of match played 28 April 2025

No.	Pos	Nat	Player	Total		A-League Women		A-League Women Finals	
No.	Pos	Nat	Player	Apps	Goals	Apps	Goals	Apps	Goals
1	GK	(Australia) AUS	Sally James	24	0	23	0	1	0
2	DF	(Australia) AUS	Alex McKenzie	17	0	10+7	0	0	0
3	DF	(New Zealand) NZL	Elizabeth Anton	19	1	19	1	0	0
4	DF	(Australia) AUS	Holly Murray	20	0	6+13	0	0+1	0
5	MF	(Philippines) PHI	Madison Ayson	15	2	14	2	1	0
6	DF	(Australia) AUS	Ivana Galic	1	0	0+1	0	0	0
7	MF	(Australia) AUS	Jynaya dos Santos	17	0	2+14	0	0+1	0
8	MF	(Australia) AUS	Tianah Miro	2	0	0+2	0	0	0
9	FW	(New Zealand) NZL	Ruby Nathan	14	1	3+10	1	0+1	0
10	MF	(Australia) AUS	Mary Stanic-Floody	23	4	17+5	4	1	0
11	MF	(Australia) AUS	Emma Robers	23	1	22	1	1	0
12	MF	(Australia) AUS	Hayley Taylor-Young	24	0	23	0	1	0
13	FW	(Australia) AUS	Sofia Christopherson	24	1	20+3	1	1	0
17	FW	(Australia) AUS	Maja Markovski	23	3	17+5	3	0+1	0
18	GK	(Australia) AUS	Coco Majstorovic	1	0	0+1	0	0	0
19	MF	(Australia) AUS	Jaya Bowman	1	0	0+1	0	0	0
20	FW	(Australia) AUS	Lillian Skelly	4	0	1+3	0	0	0
21	MF	(Australia) AUS	Aideen Keane	15	1	10+4	1	1	0
23	FW	(Australia) AUS	Michelle Heyman	21	8	18+2	7	1	1
25	MF	(Australia) AUS	Darcey Malone	23	2	19+3	2	1	0
28	DF	(Australia) AUS	Tegan Bertolissio	22	0	14+7	0	1	0
32	MF	(Australia) AUS	Bethany Gordon	18	2	15+2	2	1	0

=== Disciplinary record ===
Includes all competitions. The list is sorted by squad number when total cards are equal. Players with no cards not included in the list.

As of match played 15 December 2024

Rank	No.	Pos.	Nat.	Name	A-League Women			Total							
Rank	No.	Pos.	Nat.	Name	Yellow card	(yellow card) (yellow-red card)	Red card	Yellow card	(yellow card) (yellow-red card)	Red card					
Rank	No.	Pos.	Nat.	Name	1	2	DF	(Australia)	Alex McKenzie	2	0	0	2	0	0
2	4	DF	(Australia)	Holly Murray	1	0	0	1	0	0					
2	10	MF	(Australia)	Mary Stanic-Floody	1	0	0	1	0	0					
2	13	FW	(Australia)	Sofia Christopherson	1	0	0	1	0	0					
2	17	FW	(Australia)	Maja Markovski	1	0	0	1	0	0					
2	25	MF	(Australia)	Darcey Malone	1	0	0	1	0	0					
Total					7	0	0	7	0	0					

=== Clean sheets ===
Includes all competitions. The list is sorted by squad number when total clean sheets are equal. Numbers in parentheses represent games where both goalkeepers participated and both kept a clean sheet; the number in parentheses is awarded to the goalkeeper who was substituted on, whilst a full clean sheet is awarded to the goalkeeper who was on the field at the start of play. Goalkeepers with no clean sheets not included in the list.

As of match played 28 April 2025

Rank	No.	Nat.	Goalkeeper	A-League Women	A-League Women Finals	Total
1	1	(Australia)	Sally James	5	0	5
