= Jordan Thompson =

Jordan Thompson may refer to:

- Jordan Thompson (American football) (born 1989), American football player
- Jordan Thompson (boxer) (born 1993), English cruiserweight boxer
- Jordan Thompson (cricketer) (born 1996), English cricketer
- Jordan Thompson (footballer, born 1997), Northern Irish football midfielder
- Jordan Thompson (rugby league) (born 1991), English rugby league player
- Jordan Thompson (soccer, born 1998), American soccer defender
- Jordan Thompson (tennis) (born 1994), Australian tennis player
- Jordan Thompson (volleyball) (born 1997), American volleyball player
