= Willa Pearson =

Australian soccer player (born 2010)

Personal information
- Full name: Willa Eleanor Clare Pearson
- Date of birth: 24 December 2010 (age 15)
- Height: 1.70 m (5 ft 7 in)
- Position: Defender

Team information
- Current team: Sydney FC
- Number: 16

Youth career
- Belrose-Terrey Hills Raiders
- Sydney FC

Senior career*
Years	Team	Apps	(Gls)
2025–	Sydney FC	18	(1)

International career^{‡}
2025–	Australia U16	3	(0)
2025–	Australia U17	11	(2)
Cricket career
Cricket information
Role	Wicket-keeper
Domestic team information
Years	Team
	Manly Warringah
- * Club domestic league appearances and goals as of 13 November 2025 ‡ National team caps and goals as of 23 October 2026

Willa Eleanor Clare Pearson (born 24 December 2010) is an Australian dual-sport athlete who plays soccer as a defender for A-League Women club Sydney FC and the Australia under-17 national team, and cricket as a wicketkeeper for the Manly Warringah Waratahs.

Debuting for Sydney FC aged 14 years and 312 days old in the 2025–26 season, Pearson became the youngest player to ever play in the A-League Women. That season, she also became the youngest goalscorer in the league's history (aged 15 years and 51 days old) before becoming the youngest award winner in the league's history (being named the club's Player of the Year at 15 years and 155 days old).

== Early life ==
Pearson was born in Sydney on Christmas Eve (24 December) 2010. She resides in the Northern Beaches with her parents and two younger siblings. Pearson attended Seaforth Public School, a public primary school in the Sydney suburb of Seaforth. For secondary education, at Pymble Ladies' College, she studies Mandarin Chinese as her second language.

As a junior, Pearson played local soccer for Belrose-Terrey Hills Raiders soccer club and local cricket for Manly Warringah District.

== Club career ==
=== Sydney FC ===
In July 2025, Pearson signed her first senior contract with A-League Women club. Sydney FC. In the opening match of the 2025–26 season on 1 November 2025, she made her debut for Sydney FC, playing the full 90 minutes in the club's 2–2 draw at home with reigning premiers Melbourne City. Aged 14 years and 312 days old, she made history and became the youngest player, male or female, to ever debut in the A-Leagues. Her debut made worldwide headlines and sparked an online debate on whether she was too young to be playing in a senior sports league whilst also drawing praise for her talent, leading to comparisons to Australia national team (Matildas) player Ellie Carpenter, who is regarded as one of the best defenders in the world. The previous record was set by Ischia Brooking, who was 14 years and 347 days old when she debuted as a substitute in second half stoppage time for Sydney FC's arch-rivals Western Sydney Wanderers in a 2–2 draw away to Newcastle Jets.

Pearson scored her first goal for the club in a 4–0 away victory over Brisbane Roar on 13 February 2026. At 15 years and 51 days old, she became the youngest player to ever score in the A-League Women, breaking the record set by Matildas captain and all-time leading goalscorer, Sam Kerr. In her first season she made 18 appearances for one goal. After what was widely regarded as an impressive season despite it being Sydney FC's worst ever season (finishing 10th of 11 clubs on the League table), she was named Sydney FC Women's Player of the Year for the 2025–26 season, becoming the youngest player to ever win a player of the season award in the league at 15 years and 155 days old.

Ahead of the 2026–27 season, Pearson extended her contract with Sydney FC for two years. Due to her selection for the Australia under-17 national team (Junior Matildas) at the 2026 FIFA U-17 Women's World Cup in Morocco, she missed the opening match of the season against Adelaide United at home.

== International career ==
=== Australia U16 ===
Pearson was selected for the Australia under-16 national team by head coach Mike Cooper as part of a 23-player squad for the 2025 ASEAN U-16 Women's Championship in Indonesia from 20 to 29 August 2025. She played in three out of four matches at the tournament, which Australia won to claim their second title.

=== Australia U17 ===
Pearson was first selected for the Australia under-17 national team by head coach Cooper as part of a 23-player squad for the 2026 AFC U-17 Women's Asian Cup qualification matches at Bishan Stadium in Bishan, Singapore. She made her début and scored her first goal on 13 October 2025 in a 22–0 victory over the Northern Mariana Islands (NMI), though the NMI were later awarded the win after Australia fielded former Tonga under-16 international Tyra Bagiante, who at the time was ineligible to play for Australia. She received her second cap in an 11–0 win over hosts Singapore on 17 October 2025.

Pearson was selected by Cooper as part of a 23-player squad for the 2026 AFC U-17 Women's Asian Cup in Suzhou, China from 1 to 17 May 2026. Australia reached the semi-finals at the tournament, in which she played four out of five games.

Pearson was selected as captain by Cooper as part of a 21-player squad for the 2026 FIFA U-17 Women's World Cup in Morocco, Australia's first ever appearances at the tournament. The Junior Matildas finished third in their group and did not reach the knock-out stage.

== Career statistics ==
=== International ===
Appearances and goals by national team and year
National team	Year	Apps	Goals
Australia U16	2025	3	0
Australia U16	Total	3	0
Australia U17	2025	2	1
Australia U17	2026	4	0
Australia U17	Total	6	1
Career total		9	1

== Personal life ==
Being a dual-sport athlete in cricket and soccer during her childhood and teenage years, Pearson's favourite celebrity is Ellyse Perry, an Australian cricketer who also played soccer until 2016 who has represented Australia at both the Women's Cricket World Cup and the FIFA Women's World Cup, and like her also played for Sydney FC. In 2026, she stated that her dream was to represent Australia in both cricket and soccer at the 2032 Summer Olympic Games in Brisbane, Queensland, with playing in multiple sports at the Olympics being rare but technically possible.
