= Aideen Keane =

Australian soccer player

Personal information
- Full name: Aideen Hogan Keane
- Date of birth: 9 February 2002 (age 24)
- Place of birth: Sydney, New South Wales, Australia
- Position: Midfielder

Team information
- Current team: Melbourne City
- Number: 21

Senior career*
Years	Team	Apps	(Gls)
2017–2020	Football NSW		
2020–2021	KR Reykjavik		
2020–2021	Western Sydney Wanderers	3	(0)
2021–2022	Perth Glory	7	(2)
2022	Northern Tigers	5	(1)
2022–2023	Perth Glory	0	(0)
2023	Bulls Academy	10	(2)
2023-2024	Sydney FC	14	(1)
2024–2025	Canberra United	15	(1)
2025	Sydney Olympic		
2025–	Melbourne City	23	(6)

International career^{‡}
2019	Australia U20	4	(0)
2025	Australia U23	5	(2)
- * Club domestic league appearances and goals as of 16 October 2026 ‡ National team caps and goals as of 19 August 2025

Aideen Hogan Keane (born 9 February 2002) is an Australian soccer player who plays as a midfielder for A-League Women club Melbourne City. She previously played for Western Sydney Wanderers, Perth Glory, Sydney FC, and Canberra United. Keane has represented Australia in the national under-23 team.

== Early life ==
Keane was born on 9 February 2002 in the Sydney suburb of Westmead. She is of Irish descent and has an Irish passport. As a junior she played soccer for Baulkham Hills and then Northern Tigers.

Keane attended Westfields Sports High School and represented its soccer team, under coach Leah Blayney, in the Sydney South West Association, which won the NSW Combined High Schools Sports Association (NSWCHSSA) Secondary Football (Soccer) - Girls - Championships, in May 2018. Westfields also won the All Schools Championships in September.

== Club career ==
Keane played for Football NSW Institute in the National Premier Leagues NSW Women's (NPL NSW Women's) from 2017 to 2020. She began her A-League career with Western Sydney Wanderers in the 2020–21 season. Keane had three appearances before being transferred to Perth Glory in December 2021. For 2021–22 season she appeared seven times and provided two goals. In the A-League 2022 off-season she played for Northern Tigers in the NPL NSW Women's, with one goal from five appearances, before returning to Perth Glory.

Her 2022–23 season with Perth Glory was disrupted by an ACL injury – she was unable to play for 11 months while undertaking rehabilitation. In June 2023 she was transferred to Bulls FC Academy in the NPL NSW Women's for ten appearances and two goals.

In August 2023 Keane was transferred to Sydney for the 2023-24 season. With 14 appearances she provided one goal and helped her team win the Championship. The midfielder scored a goal for Sydney, as part of Group B, at the 2023 AFC Women's Club Championship in their 3–0 victory against Iranian team Bam Khatoon F.C., held in Tashkent, Uzbekistan in November. Sydney did not proceed to the final. Keane signed with Canberra United in September 2024 for the 2024–25 season; she appeared 15 times for one goal. During 2025 offseason, she was loaned to Sydney Olympic in the NPL NSW Women's. Keane scored a hattrick in Olympics 4–2 defeat of NWS Spirit in July.

In September 2025, Keane joined Melbourne City. In her first season she appeared 23 times providing six goals and helped Melbourne City win both the Premiership and Championship.

== International career ==
Australia women's national under-20 soccer team (Young Matildas) coach, Blayney named Keane to the final squad for the 2019 AFC U-19 Women's Championship held in Thailand from 27 October to 9 November.

Keane joined the 23-player squad for the Australia women's national under-23 soccer team (U23 Matildas), which competed at the 2025 ASEAN Women's Championship in Vietnam from 6 to 19 August. All their opponents fielded senior national squads. Her maiden goal for her team occurred in the 9–0 defeat of Timor-Leste on 13 August, which helped the Australians reach the knock-out stage. Keane scored the first goal in the 2–1 win against Vietnam in the semi-final on 16 August, "[Australia] went ahead in the sixth minute following a short corner routine with [Keane] rising highest at the near post to nod home Leticia McKenna’s cross." Australia U23 were crowned champions after their 1–0 victory over Myanmar, Keane assisted Holly Furphy's winner.
