= Jynaya dos Santos =

Australian soccer player (born 2005)

Personal information
- Full name: Jynaya Rose dos Santos
- Date of birth: 22 September 2005 (age 21)
- Height: 1.69 m (5 ft 7 in)
- Position: Midfielder

Youth career
- Shellharbour Junior FC
- 2022: Football NSW Institute

Senior career*
Years	Team	Apps	(Gls)
2022–2024	Sydney FC	8	(1)
2024–2025	Canberra United	17	(0)
2025–2026	Central Coast Mariners	9	(1)

International career^{‡}
2022–	Australia U20	12	(4)
- * Club domestic league appearances and goals as of 4 January 2026 ‡ National team caps and goals as of 4 January 2026

Jynaya Rose dos Santos (/dʒɪˈneɪə dɒs ˈsæntɒs/ ji-NAY-ə doss SAN-toss, European Portuguese: [duʃ ˈsɐ̃tuʃ]; born 22 September 2005) is an Australian professional soccer player who last played as a midfielder for A-League Women club Central Coast Mariners and for the Australia women's national under-20 team. She previously played for Sydney FC and Canberra United.

Dos Santos is the older sister of Sydney FC player Indiana dos Santos.

== Early life ==
Dos Santos was born on 22 September 2005 to parents Mark and Melissa dos Santos. She grew up in the suburb of Shell Cove in Wollongong. She has three sisters: Indiana, Kyani and Imogen. She is of Portuguese and Maltese descents, with her father being the son of Portuguese immigrants and her mother being the daughter of Maltese immigrants.

== Club career ==
=== Sydney FC ===
Dos Santos made her debut for Sydney FC in the 2022–23 season. She played more consistent minutes in the 2023–24 season, scoring her first goal in a 1–0 home win over Wellington Phoenix on 29 December 2023.

Dos Santos was part of Sydney FC's squad that won back-to-back championships in 2023 and 2024.

=== Canberra United ===
Dos Santos signed for Canberra United in 2024, ahead of the 2024–25 A-League Women season.

=== Central Coast Mariners ===
In October 2025, Dos Santos joined defending champions Central Coast Mariners. In October 2026, it was revealed she had left the club at the end of her contract.

== International career ==
Dos Santos was part of Australia's squad for the 2024 AFC U-20 Women's Asian Cup in Uzbekistan and 2024 FIFA U-20 Women's World Cup in Colombia.
