= Tori Tumeth =

Australian soccer player (born 2001)

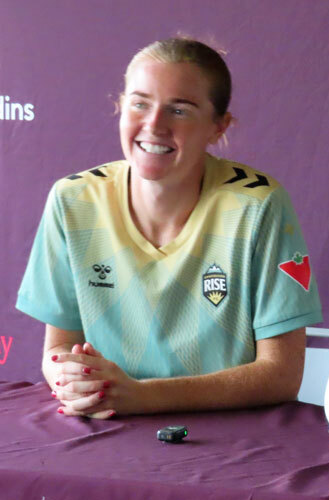
- Tumeth in 2026

Personal information
- Date of birth: 4 March 2001 (age 25)
- Place of birth: Sydney, New South Wales, Australia
- Positions: Defender; midfielder

Team information
- Current team: Vancouver Rise
- Number: 6

Youth career
- APIA Leichhardt

Senior career*
Years	Team	Apps	(Gls)
2018–2020	Sydney University		
2020–2022	Melbourne City	28	(1)
2023–2026	Sydney FC	67	(0)
2026–	Vancouver Rise	21	(0)

International career^{‡}
2016–2018	Australia U17	4	(0)
2018–2021	Australia U20	6	(1)
2025	Australia U23	4	(0)
2026–	Australia	2	(0)
- * Club domestic league appearances and goals as of 4 October 2026 ‡ National team caps and goals as of 13 October 2026

Tori Tumeth (/ˈtjuːməθ/ TEW-məth; born 4 March 2001) is an Australian soccer player who plays as a right back for Northern Super League club Vancouver Rise. She has previously played for National Premier Leagues NSW Women's (NPL NSW Women's) club Sydney University and A-League Women clubs Melbourne City and Sydney FC. She has represented Australia as an under-20 and under-23 youth international.

== Early years ==
Tori Tumeth was born in 2001 in Sydney. She played junior soccer for APIA Leichhardt, Canterbury and then Sydney University youths (2013–2014). After completing her HSC in 2018, she began a Primary Education degree course at Sydney University.

== Club career ==
In 2016 Tumeth began playing for Football NSW Institute, which competes in the National Premier Leagues NSW Women's (NPL NSW Women's). She continued with that team into 2017.

=== Sydney University ===
Tumeth transferred to Sydney University seniors in 2018. She played a key role in the club's 2019 treble-winning season in the NPL NSW Women's. She played as both a defender and midfielder during her three seasons at the club, and transitioned into becoming solely a defender.

=== Melbourne City ===
Tumeth signed for W-League (later known as A-League Women) team Melbourne City in their 2020–21 season and made her debut on 29 December. In her second season they finished second behind premiers, Sydney FC and qualified for the finals series. Despite kicking her maiden goal in the Preliminary Final, Melbourne City lost 1–3 to crosstown rivals Melbourne Victory in March 2022. Tumeth left the club in 2023 having made a total of 28 appearances for one goal.

=== Sydney FC ===
Tumeth transferred to Sydney FC in 2023. She was part of the side that won the 2024 grand final, defeating her former side Melbourne City 1–0 at AAMI Park in Melbourne, the club's fifth A-League Women championship.

After establishing herself as a fan favourite at the club, Tumeth extended her contract with Sydney FC in 2025. At the end of the 2025–26 season, pundit Teo Pellizzeri announced on the program DubZone that she and teammate Hana Lowry would be departing the club to pursue opportunities overseas.

=== Vancouver Rise ===
On 27 April 2026, it was announced that Tumeth had joined Northern Super League club Vancouver Rise.

== International career ==
Tumeth has represented Australia as a youth international for under-17 (2016–2018), under-20 (2018–2021) and under-23 level.

Despite being aged 24 at the time, Tumeth played for the U23 Matildas to win their first ever ASEAN Women's Championship title in 2025, defeating senior Southeast Asian national teams (including their 1–0 win over Myanmar in the final).

In September 2026, Tumeth received her first senior call up to the Australian national team's squad. She made her debut in a 4–2 loss against Germany on 9 October, coming on as a substitute in the 87th minute.

== Career statistics ==
=== International ===
As of match played on 13 October 2026

Appearances and goals by national team and year
National team	Year	Apps	Goals
Australia	2026	2	0
Total		2	0
