= Indiana dos Santos =

Australian soccer player (born 2007)

Personal information
- Full name: Indiana Shae dos Santos
- Date of birth: 10 October 2007 (age 19)
- Place of birth: Wollongong, New South Wales, Australia
- Height: 1.69 m (5 ft 7 in)
- Position: Attacking midfielder

Team information
- Current team: Sydney FC
- Number: 10

Youth career
- Shellharbour Junior FC

Senior career*
Years	Team	Apps	(Gls)
2022–	Sydney FC	36	(3)

International career
2023–2025	Australia U17	7	(1)
2023–	Australia U20	12	(0)
- * Club domestic league appearances and goals

Indiana Shae dos Santos (/dɒs ˈsæntɒs/ doss SAN-toss, European Portuguese: [ĩˈdjɐnɐ duʃ ˈsɐ̃tuʃ]; born 10 October 2007) is an Australian professional soccer player who plays as an attacking midfielder for A-League Women club Sydney FC and for the Australia women's national under-20 team. She has been described as one of the best young talents in Australian women's soccer.

Dos Santos is the younger sister of Canberra United player Jynaya dos Santos.

== Early life ==
Dos Santos was born in Wollongong, New South Wales on 10 October 2007, to parents Mark and Melissa dos Santos. She has three sisters: Jynaya, Kyani and Imogen. She is of Portuguese and Maltese descent, with her father being the son of Portuguese immigrants and her mother being the daughter of Maltese immigrants.

Dos Santos attended Westfields Sports High School in the suburb of Fairfield West in Sydney, having graduated in 2025. At school, her strongest subject is maths.

Since she was a child, dos Santos has been a supporter of Sydney FC.

== Club career ==
=== Sydney FC ===
Dos Santos made her debut for Sydney FC in 2023. At just 15 years and 146 days old on her debut, she is the youngest player to ever play for the club. Later that year, she also became the club's youngest ever goalscorer. She was part of Sydney FC's squad that won the 2023 A-League Women Grand Final, making her the youngest grand finalist in the league.

Dos Santos went viral for a mid-game rainbow flick in 2024. Later that year, she was part of Sydney FC's squad that won the club its second consecutive championship in the 2024 A-League Women Grand Final.

In 2025, dos Santos ruptured her anterior cruciate ligament (ACL).

== International career ==
Dos Santos captained Australia at the 2024 AFC U-17 Women's Asian Cup in Indonesia. She was also part of Australia's squad for the 2024 FIFA U-20 Women's World Cup in Colombia.
