= Casey Reibelt =

Australian soccer referee (born 1988)

- Full name: Casey Lisa Reibelt
- Born: 15 January 1988 (age 38); Brisbane, Australia

Domestic
Years	League	Role
2008–	W-League/A-League Women	Referee
2022-	A-League	Referee

International
Years	League	Role
2014–	FIFA listed	Referee

Casey Lisa Reibelt (born 15 January 1988) is an Australian soccer referee who officiates in the A-League Women (W-League prior to 2021) and is an international referee.

Reibelt took to refereeing at the age of 15. She began officiating in the A-League Women, then known as W-League, in 2008 and has been FIFA listed since 2014. The W-League was rebranded in 2021.

She was selected to officiate at the 2019 FIFA Women's World Cup in France. She refereed one match in the group stages.

On 9 January 2023, FIFA appointed her to the officiating pool for the 2023 FIFA Women's World Cup in Australia and New Zealand. She refereed two matches in the group stages (one in each country), and was a fourth official during a round of 16 match.
