= Kirsty Fenton =

Australian soccer player

Personal information
- Full name: Kirsty Jane Fenton
- Date of birth: 6 September 2003 (age 23)
- Place of birth: Newcastle, Australia
- Position: Defender

Youth career
- Newcastle Jets

Senior career*
Years	Team	Apps	(Gls)
2021–2022	Newcastle Jets	13	(1)
2022–2026	Sydney FC	34	(1)

International career^{‡}
2022	Australia Under-20	3	(1)
- * Club domestic league appearances and goals as of 27 May 2024 ‡ National team caps and goals as of 17 August 2022

Kirsty Jane Fenton (born 6 September 2003) is a former Australian professional footballer who played for A-League Women club Sydney FC.

== Early life ==
Fenton grew up in Toronto, New South Wales and attended Hunter Sports High School in Gateshead. She was a member of the Newcastle Jets Academy from the age of 13.

== Club career ==
=== Newcastle Jets ===
After featuring for the various Newcastle Jets Youth teams for all of her teenage years Fenton was rewarded with a contract to the first team ahead of the 2021–22 season.

Fenton made her A-League Women debut for the Jets on Matchday One as she started at left back in the absence of the injured Gema Simon. She continued to start for the team and opened the scoring in a 5–1 win over the Wellington Phoenix the following week.

=== Sydney FC ===
In September 2022, Fenton joined A-League Women club Sydney FC.

In April 2023, Fenton was part of the 2022-23 Premiership team who were crowned Liberty A-League Champions beating Western United 4–0 in the Grand Final, in front of a record crowd at CommBank Stadium.

In October 2026, Sydney FC approved a request to terminate Fenton's contract, despite having two years remaining, after Fenton expressed her desires to explore opportunities outside of football.

== International career ==
Fenton was selected to represent Australia in the 2022 FIFA U-20 Women's World Cup. She scored the final goal of the match in Australia's opening group stage game against Costa Rica, which Australia won 3-1. Following this, Fenton featured in Australia's final two group stage games, which were losses against Brazil and Spain.

== Career statistics ==
As of match played 7 March 2022

Appearances and goals by club, season and competition
Club	Season	League			Cup		Continental		Other		Total	
Club	Season	Division	Apps	Goals	Apps	Goals	Apps	Goals	Apps	Goals	Apps	Goals
Newcastle Jets	2021–22	A-League Women	13	1	-	-	-	-	-	-	13	1
Career total			13	1	0	0	0	0	0	0	13	1
