= Charlotte McLean =

Australian footballer (born 2000)

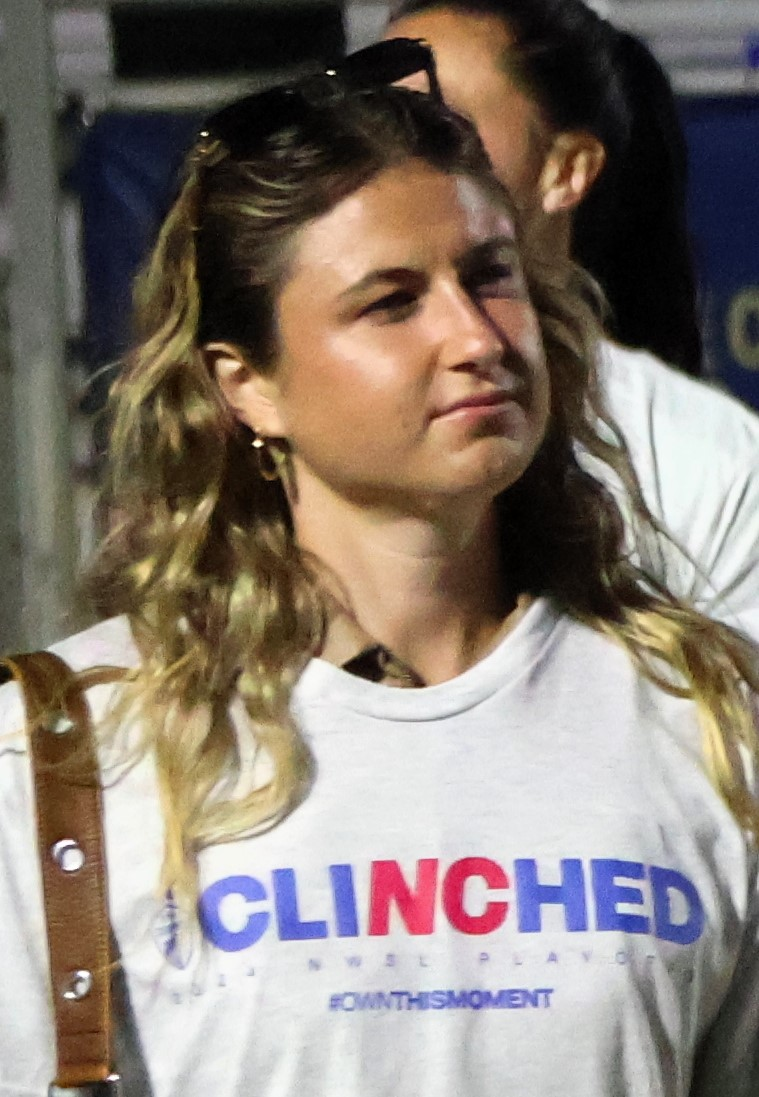
- McLean with the North Carolina Courage in 2024

Personal information
- Full name: Charlotte Darcy McLean
- Date of birth: 1 March 2000 (age 26)
- Place of birth: Sydney, New South Wales, Australia
- Height: 1.69 m (5 ft 7 in)
- Positions: Centre-back; right-back

Team information
- Current team: Sydney FC
- Number: 3

Senior career*
Years	Team	Apps	(Gls)
2018–2019	Sydney University	32	(2)
2020	Sydney Olympic	12	(1)
2020–2024	Sydney FC	74	(1)
2024–2025	North Carolina Courage	0	(0)
2025	→ Tampa Bay Sun (loan)	4	(0)
2026–	Sydney FC	0	(0)
- * Club domestic league appearances and goals as of 22 December 2025

Charlotte Darcy McLean (born 1 March 2000) is an Australian professional footballer who plays as a defender for A-League Women club Sydney FC. She began her career with Sydney FC in 2020, winning two league championships and three premierships. She was twice named in the PFA Team of the Season and was Sydney FC's Player of the Year in 2024.

== Club career ==
=== Early career ===
McLean was born in the Sydney suburb of Epping. She attended Cheltenham Girls High School where she won the Puma Trophy state tournament and was named player of the final in 2016. She joined NPL NSW Women's club Sydney University in 2018, winning two league premierships, one league championship, and two NPL Challenge Cups. In 2020, she moved to NPL NSW Women's club Sydney Olympic alongside Sydney University teammate Cortnee Vine.

=== Sydney FC ===
McLean signed with W-League club Sydney FC after playing against them in training with Sydney Olympic. On 30 December 2020, she made her W-League debut and played the entire match in a 3–0 win over the Western Sydney Wanderers. She was mostly used at right-back during the 2020–21 season as Sydney FC won the premiership with the best record in the league. The club also posted the league's best defence and reached their fourth consecutive grand final, losing 1–0 to Melbourne Victory.

McLean moved to centre-back in the 2021–22 season and played every minute in the renamed A-League Women as Sydney FC retained the premiership in dominant fashion, allowing just 6 goals in their 14 league games. The club again advanced to the grand final, but Cortnee Vine's goal was not enough as they lost 2–1 again to Melbourne Victory.

On 5 March 2023, McLean fractured her cheekbone colliding with a teammate in the closing minutes of their 3–0 win against Western United. She missed the last five games of the 2022–23 season as Sydney FC clinched their third consecutive premiership, before returning for the semifinals on 16 April, losing 1–0 to Western United. She then helped Sydney FC win 1–0 over Melbourne Victory in the preliminary final to reach their sixth consecutive grand final, winning 4–0 against Western United to claim the club's fourth A-League Women championship and first since 2019. Sydney FC were the first team to complete the league double since Melbourne Victory in 2020. McLean was honoured in the Professional Footballers Australia (PFA) A-League Women Team of the Season alongside centre-back partner Natalie Tobin.

On 26 November 2023, McLean scored her first A-League Women goal with a long-range effort that was deflected through traffic in a 3–2 loss to Melbourne Victory. She again played every minute in the 2023–24 season as Sydney FC finished second in the league table, recording the best defence in the league for the fourth consecutive season. Sydney FC advanced to their seventh consecutive grand final and won 1–0 against premiers Melbourne City, defending their title and becoming the first A-League Women club to win five championships. McLean was named in the PFA Team of the Season for the second time. She was also named the club's Player of the Year recognising her performance in leading the defence without captain Natalie Tobin. On 14 June 2024, Sydney FC confirmed that she and teammate Cortnee Vine would leave the club for an opportunity in the National Women's Soccer League (NWSL).

=== North Carolina Courage ===
On 17 June 2024, the NWSL's North Carolina Courage announced they had signed McLean to a one-and-a-half-year contract. Vine followed one day later. On 6 August, McLean made her first and only appearance for the Courage as a stoppage-time substitute for Dani Weatherholt in a 2–0 loss to the Kansas City Current in the Summer Cup semifinals.

On 14 July 2025, McLean joined USL Super League club Tampa Bay Sun on loan for the rest of the year. She made her debut for the Sun on 6 September, being replaced at halftime in a 2–2 draw with the Carolina Ascent. She missed two months with a foot injury and made only 4 appearances during the loan.

=== Return to Sydney FC ===
With two games remaining in the 2025–26 season, Sydney FC announced the return of McLean on 26 March 2026.

== Personal life ==
McLean has been in a relationship with Sydney FC and North Carolina Courage teammate Cortnee Vine since 2019.

== Honours and awards ==
Sydney FC

- A-League Women: 2022–23, 2023–24
- A-League Women Premiership: 2020–21, 2021–22, 2022–23

Individual

- PFA Team of the Season: 2022–23, 2023–24
- Sydney FC Player of the Year: 2023–24
