= Lucy Johnson (soccer) =

Australian soccer player

Personal information
- Full name: Lucy Johnson
- Date of birth: 1 April 1999 (age 27)
- Place of birth: Sydney, Australia
- Position: Midfielder

Youth career
- Lindfield Football Club
- Olympia FC Warriors
- Hobart Zebras

Senior career*
Years	Team	Apps	(Gls)
2019	Alamein FC	28	(12)
2020–2021	South Melbourne	12	(9)
2021–2023	Newcastle Jets	31	(1)
2023	Sydney Olympic	18	(0)
2023–2025	Sydney FC	41	(4)
- * Club domestic league appearances and goals as of 16 July 2025

Lucy Johnson (born 2 November 1996) is an Australian soccer player who last played for Sydney FC.

== Early life ==
Johnson was born in Sydney and began playing football for Lindfield Football Club before moving to Tasmania at the age of 10. Sister to Patrick, cousins with Kate, Amy, Zoe, Tommo, Livvi and Jack.

== Club career ==
Johnson played in the Tasmanian Women's Super League before moving to Alamein FC and later South Melbourne in the National Premier Leagues Victoria Women. In Victoria Johnson established herself as an influential goalscorer despite her position in midfield as she scored 21 goals in 40 appearances across three seasons in the competition.

As a result of her form in the Victorian NPLW Johnson was signed by Newcastle Jets in the A-League Women ahead of the 2021–22 season. Johnson would become the first Tasmanian to represent the team.

In August 2023, Johnson joined Sydney FC. After one season, in May 2024, Johnson departed the club. Four months later, Sydney FC announced that they had re-signed her for the 2024–25 A-League Women season. In July 2025, the club announced that they decided not to extend Johnson's contract.

== Career statistics ==
As of match played 7 March 2022

Appearances and goals by club, season and competition
Club	Season	League			Cup		Continental		Other		Total	
Club	Season	Division	Apps	Goals	Apps	Goals	Apps	Goals	Apps	Goals	Apps	Goals
Newcastle Jets	2021–22	A-League Women	13	0	-	-	-	-	-	-	13	0
Career total			13	0	0	0	0	0	0	0	13	0
