= Margaux Chauvet =

Australian soccer player (born 2002)

Personal information
- Full name: Margaux Marianne Chauvet
- Date of birth: 27 May 2002 (age 24)
- Place of birth: Abidjan, Ivory Coast
- Position: Defensive midfielder

Team information
- Current team: Valadares Gaia FC
- Number: 16

College career
Years	Team	Apps	(Gls)
2025	Purdue Boilermakers	19	(1)

Senior career*
Years	Team	Apps	(Gls)
2020–2022	Western Sydney Wanderers	5	(0)
2022–2023	KR Reykjavík	13	(0)
2023–2025	Sydney FC	25	(0)
2026–	Valadares Gaia FC	1	(0)
- * Club domestic league appearances and goals as of 3 March 2026

Margaux Marianne Chauvet (French: [maʁ.ɡo ma.ʁjan ʃo.vɛ]; born 27 May 2002) is a soccer player who plays as a defensive midfielder for Campeonato Nacional Feminino club Valadares Gaia. Born in Abidjan, Ivory Coast to French parents, she has represented Australia as a youth international after her family migrated to Wollongong, New South Wales. She previously played for A-League Women clubs Western Sydney Wanderers and Sydney FC and Besta deild kvenna club KR Reykjavík, and played college soccer for Purdue Boilermakers at Purdue University in West Lafayette, Indiana.

== Early life ==
Chauvet was born on 27 May 2002 to French parents in Abidjan, Abidjan Department. Due to the First Ivorian Civil War, and her family were forced to relocate away from Ivory Coast, settling in Wollongong, New South Wales.

== Club career ==
Chauvet started her career with Illawarra Stingrays. After that, she signed for Western Sydney Wanderers. In 2022, she signed for Icelandic side KR.

In August 2023, Chauvet joined Sydney FC.

In June 2025 Chauvet was released by Sydney FC to continue her development in the US college system. The following month she joined Purdue Boilermakers, the athletics team of Purdue University in West Lafayette, Indiana.

In January 2026, Chauvet moved to Portugal and signed for Campeonato Nacional Feminino club Valadares Gaia during the 2025–26 season.

== International career ==
In 2020, Chauvet was invited to the Australia youth women's national soccer team's first Talent Identification Camp.

== Style of play ==
Chauvet mainly operates as a defender but has played as a midfielder at senior level.

== Personal life ==
Chauvet is the daughter of Renaud Chauvet.
