= Jordan Thompson (soccer, born 1998) =

American soccer player

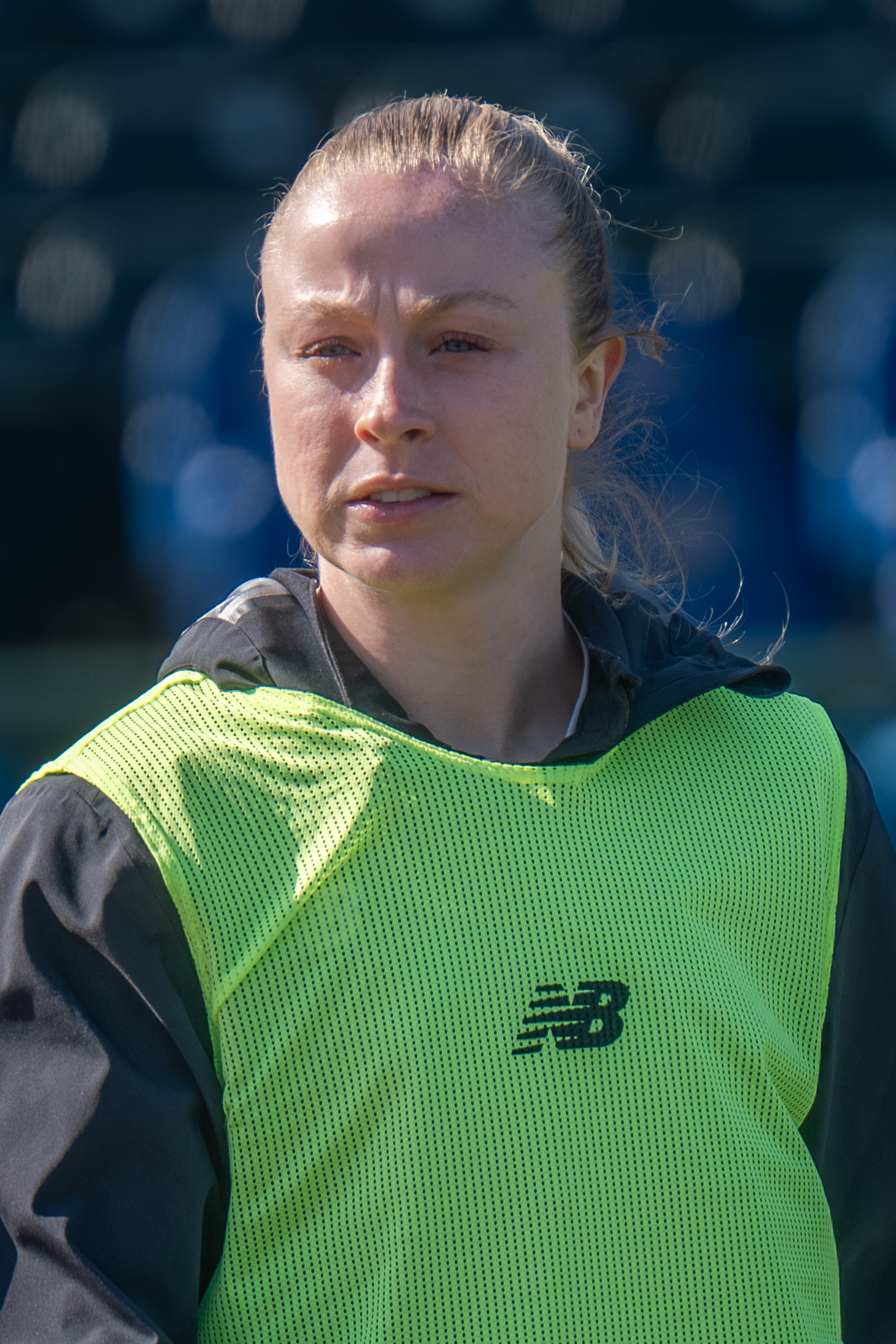
- Thompson with Brooklyn FC in 2026

Personal information
- Date of birth: September 8, 1998 (age 28)
- Place of birth: Sumner, Washington, United States
- Height: 5 ft 3 in (1.60 m)
- Position: Defender

Team information
- Current team: Brooklyn FC
- Number: 5

College career
Years	Team	Apps	(Gls)
2017–2021	Gonzaga Bulldogs	81	(7)

Senior career*
Years	Team	Apps	(Gls)
2022–2023	Washington Spirit	0	(0)
2023	Hapoel Ra'anana	1	(1)
2023–2025	Sydney FC	42	(0)
2025–	Brooklyn FC	26	(1)
- * Club domestic league appearances and goals as of 20:15, May 17, 2026 (UTC)

Jordan Thompson (born September 8, 1998) is an American professional soccer player who plays as a defender for USL Super League club Brooklyn FC. She played college soccer for the Gonzaga Bulldogs before starting her professional career with National Women's Soccer League (NWSL) club Washington Spirit, Ligat Nashim club Hapoel Ra'anana and A-League Women club Sydney FC.

== Early life ==
Thompson was born on September 8, 1998 in Sumner, Washington.

== College career ==
Thompson attended Gonzaga University in Spokane, Washington, where she played 81 games and scored seven goals for the Gonzaga Bulldogs, before being drafted by National Women's Soccer League (NWSL) club Washington Spirit.

== Club career ==
=== Washington Spirit ===
Thompson was drafted by the Washington Spirit for the 2022 NWSL season. However, she missed most of the season due to injury.

=== Hapoel Ra'anana ===
Thompson signed for Ligat Nashim club Hapoel Ra'anana in 2023. However, her time at the club did not last long, playing her last game on October 6, 2023 (in which she scored her first goal). Due to the October 7 attacks by Hamas which led to beginning of the Gaza war, Thompson was forced to flee Israel and return to the United States before moving to Australia.

=== Sydney FC ===
After fleeing Israel, Thompson signed for A-League Women club Sydney FC for their 2023–24 season. With the club, she won the 2023 A-League Women grand final, in which Sydney FC defeated regular season premiers Melbourne City 1–0 at AAMI Park in Melbourne. It was the club's second consecutive championship and their record fifth championship overall.

Thompson re-signed for Sydney FC for the 2024–25 season. However, the club went on to have their worst season ever, finishing eighth and missing the finals for the first time in A-League Women history. Thompson departed the club in 2025, returning to the United States to be closer to family.

=== Brooklyn FC ===
In 2025, Thompson signed for USL Super League club Brooklyn FC. She debuted for the club on August 23, starting and playing 86 minutes in Brooklyn's opening-day victory over Tampa Bay Sun FC. On February 14, 2026, she scored her first USL Super League goal, a header from a corner kick against Fort Lauderdale United FC.
