= Mackenzie Hawkesby =

Australian soccer player

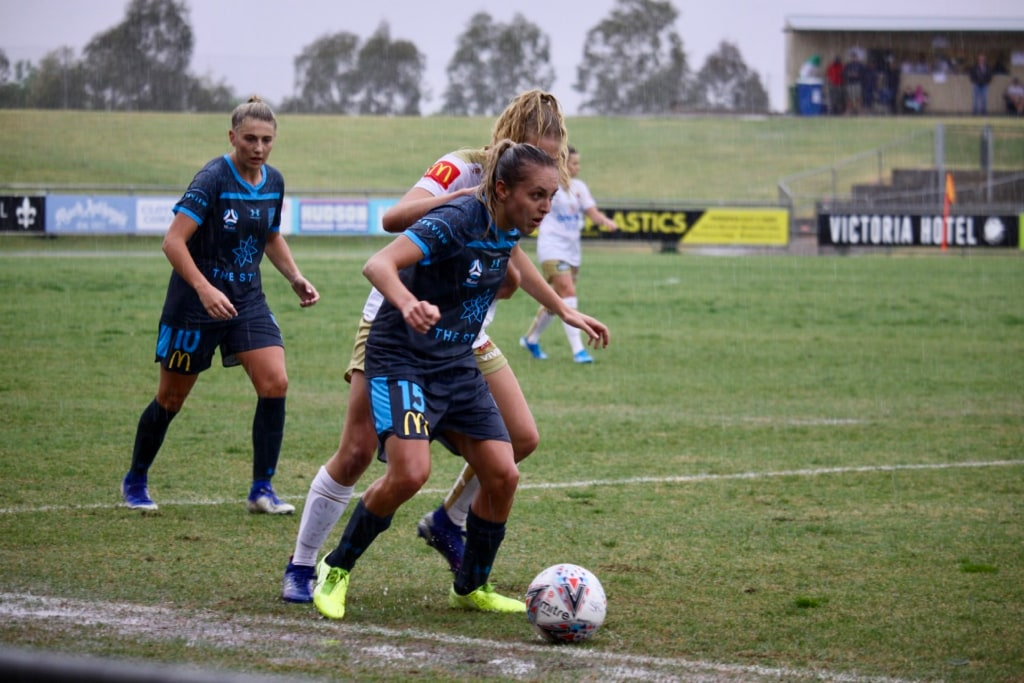
- Hawkesby with Sydney FC in 2021

Personal information
- Full name: Mackenzie Hawkesby
- Date of birth: 13 April 2000 (age 26)
- Place of birth: Wollongong, New South Wales, Australia
- Height: 1.60 m (5 ft 3 in)
- Position: Midfielder

Senior career*
Years	Team	Apps	(Gls)
2018	Western Sydney Wanderers	0	(0)
2019–2023	Sydney FC	58	(14)
2022	Sydney Olympic	9	(4)
2023	Brighton & Hove Albion	0	(0)
2023–2026	Sydney FC	42	(12)

International career^{‡}
2022–2023	Australia U23	3	(4)
- * Club domestic league appearances and goals as of 8 November 2025 ‡ National team caps and goals as of 22 June 2022

Mackenzie Hawkesby (born 13 April 2000) is an Australian professional soccer player who last played for A-League Women club Sydney FC.

== Club career ==
=== Sydney FC (2019–2023) ===
Hawkesby made her senior debut for Sydney FC on 17 November 2019 in a 3–0 win against Melbourne Victory. In the 2021–22 A-League Women, Hawkesby played every available minute and led the league in assists, crosses, and chances created. Her five goals that season included a first-half hat trick against Wellington Phoenix FC.

=== Brighton & Hove Albion (2023) ===
On 21 July 2023, Hawkesby signed for Brighton & Hove Albion in the English Women's Super League. Hawkesby made just one appearance before she and the club agreed to part ways.

=== Sydney FC (2023–2026) ===
On 29 December 2023, Sydney FC announced Hawkesby's return to the club, signing until the end of the 2023–24 A-League Women season. She finished the season with 5 goals and 3 assists in 18 appearances, was named to the bench of the Professional Footballers Australia team of the season, and named player of the match for the 2024 A-League Women grand final match on the way to Sydney FC winning its second consecutive league championship.

Sydney FC announced Hawkesby's departure on 15 June 2026.

== International career ==
In June 2022, after an impressive season with Sydney FC, Hawkesby was called up to Australia's senior national team for their upcoming friendlies against Spain and Portugal.

== Career statistics ==
=== Club ===
As of match played 4 May 2024.

Appearances and goals by club, season and competition
Club	Season	League			National Cup		League Cup		Total	
Club	Season	Division	Apps	Goals	Apps	Goals	Apps	Goals	Apps	Goals
Western Sydney Wanderers	2018–19	W-League	0	0	—		—		0	0
Sydney FC	2019–20	W-League	8	0	—		—		8	0
Sydney FC	2020–21	W-League	14	3	—		—		14	3
Sydney FC	2021–22	A-League Women	16	5	—		—		16	5
Sydney FC	2022–23	A-League Women	20	6	—		—		20	6
Sydney FC	Total		58	14	—		—		58	14
Sydney Olympic FC Women	2022	National Premier Leagues NSW Women	9	4	—		—		9	4
Brighton & Hove Albion	2023–24	WSL	0	0	0	0	1	0	1	0
Sydney FC	2023–24	A-League Women	18	5	—		—		18	5
Career total			85	23	0	0	1	0	86	23
