= 2021–22 Sydney FC (women) season =

Sydney FC (women)
2021–22 season
- Manager: Ante Juric
- Stadium: Jubilee Stadium; Leichhardt Oval
- A-League Women: 1st of 10 (Premiers)
- A-League Finals Series: Runners-up
- Top goalscorer: League: Cortnee Vine (6); All: Cortnee Vine (9)
- Highest home attendance: 5,027 (27 March 2022 vs. Melbourne Victory)
- Lowest home attendance: 350 (8 January 2022 vs. Perth Glory)
Home colours	Away colours	Third colours

The 2021–22 Sydney FC (women) season was the club's 14th season in the A-League Women (formerly the W-League), the premier competition for women's football in Australia.

== Squad ==
Note: Flags indicate national team as defined under FIFA eligibility rules; some limited exceptions apply. Players may hold more than one non-FIFA nationality.

No.	Pos.	Nation	Player
1	GK	AUS	Jada Mathyssen-Whyman
2	DF	AUS	Mary Stanic-Floody (scholarship)
3	DF	AUS	Charlotte McLean
4	DF	AUS	Jessika Nash
5	DF	NZL	Ally Green
6	MF	AUS	Sarah Hunter
7	DF	AUS	Ellie Brush
8	MF	AUS	Rachel Lowe
9	FW	CHI	María José Rojas
10	FW	AUS	Remy Siemsen
11	FW	AUS	Cortnee Vine

No.	Pos.	Nation	Player
12	MF	AUS	Natalie Tobin (captain)
13	DF	AUS	Natasha Prior
14	FW	NZL	Paige Satchell
15	MF	AUS	Mackenzie Hawkesby
16	FW	AUS	Kahli Johnson (scholarship)
17	DF	AUS	Angelique Hristodoulou
18	MF	AUS	Taylor Ray
19	DF	AUS	Charlize Rule
20	FW	AUS	Princess Ibini
30	GK	AUS	Katie Offer
40	GK	AUS	Eliza Campbell

== Transfers ==
=== Transfers in ===
Date	Player	Moving from	Transfer Window	Source
13 August 2021	(New Zealand) Paige Satchell	Canberra United	Pre-season	
3 September 2021	Sarah Hunter	Western Sydney Wanderers	Pre-season	
3 September 2021	Jessika Nash	Canberra United	Pre-season	
6 September 2021	(Chile) María José Rojas	Adelaide United	Pre-season	
9 September 2021	Kahli Johnson	Unattached	Pre-season	
9 September 2021	Mary Stanic-Floody	Unattached	Pre-season	

=== Transfers out ===
Date	Player	Moving to	Transfer Window	Source
29 March 2021	Claudia Cholakian	Sydney Olympic	Pre-season	
11 June 2021	Clare Wheeler	(Denmark) Fortuna Hjørring	Pre-season	
6 August 2021	Teresa Polias	Unattached	Pre-season	
7 September 2021	Allira Toby	Canberra United	Pre-season	
2 December 2021	Elizabeth Ralston	Western Sydney Wanderers	Pre-season free agency	

== Competitions ==
=== A-League Women ===
==== League table ====
Pos	Team	Pld	W	D	L	GF	GA	GD	Pts	Qualification
1	Sydney FC	14	11	2	1	36	6	+30	35	Qualification to Finals series
2	Melbourne City	14	11	0	3	29	11	+18	33	Qualification to Finals series
3	Adelaide United	14	9	0	5	33	18	+15	27	Qualification to Finals series
4	Melbourne Victory (C)	14	7	3	4	26	22	+4	24	Qualification to Finals series
5	Perth Glory	14	7	3	4	20	23	−3	24	
6	Brisbane Roar	14	5	2	7	29	30	−1	17	
7	Canberra United	14	2	7	5	24	29	−5	13	
8	Newcastle Jets	14	2	4	8	15	30	−15	10	
9	Western Sydney Wanderers	14	1	4	9	7	27	−20	7	
10	Wellington Phoenix	14	2	1	11	13	36	−23	7	

Source: A-Leagues
Rules for classification: 1) points; 2) goal difference; 3) number of goals scored.
(C) Champions

==== Results by round ====
Round	1	2	3	4	5	6	7	12	10	11	9	8	13	14
Ground	H	A	H	H	A	H	H	H	H	A	A	A	A	A
Result	W	W	W	D	W	W	W	W	W	W	D	L	W	W
Position	2	2	1	1	1	1	1	1	1	1	1	1	1	1
Points	3	6	9	10	13	16	19	22	25	28	29	29	32	35

Source: A-Leagues
A = Away; H = Home; W = Win; D = Draw; L = Loss

==== Matches ====
Win Draw Loss

- All times are in AEDT

4 December 2021 1	Sydney FC	3–1	Newcastle Jets	Sydney
	Siemsen 52'; Ibini 58'; Vine 69'	Report	Allan 67'	Stadium: Netstrata Jubilee Stadium; Attendance: 1,997; Referee: Rebecca Mackie

11 December 2021 2	Western Sydney Wanderers	0–2	Sydney FC	Parramatta
		Report	Siemsen 18', 48'	Stadium: CommBank Stadium; Attendance: 1,992; Referee: Lara Lee

19 December 2021 3	Sydney FC	3–0	Wellington Phoenix	Sydney
16:05	Vine 24'; Rule 53'; Hawkesby 66'	Report		Stadium: Netstrata Jubilee Stadium; Attendance: 1,045; Referee: Georgia Ghirardello

27 December 2021 4	Sydney FC	0–0	Western Sydney Wanderers	Sydney
16:05		Report		Stadium: Leichhardt Oval; Referee: Isabella Blaess

30 December 2021 5	Wellington Phoenix	0–5	Sydney FC	Wollongong
17:05		Report	Lowe 4'; Hawkesby 14' (pen.), 29', 44'; Vine 38'	Stadium: WIN Stadium; Attendance: 309; Referee: Lara Lee

8 January 2022 6	Sydney FC	4–0	Perth Glory	Sydney
19:45	Hawkesby 11'; Vine 17'; Siemsen 25'; Rule 49'	Report		Stadium: Netstrata Jubilee Stadium; Attendance: 350; Referee: Casey Reibelt

15 January 2022 7	Sydney FC	6–0	Canberra United	Sydney
17:05	Rojas 28' (pen.), 41', 64'; Green 62'; Ibini 83'; Lowe 88'	Report		Stadium: Netstrata Jubilee Stadium; Attendance: 1,319; Referee: Isabella Blaess

22 January 2022 12	Sydney FC	3–0	Melbourne City	Sydney
13:05	Satchell 33'; Lowe 44', 74'	Report		Stadium: Netstrata Jubilee Stadium; Attendance: 1,259; Referee: Rachael Mitchenson

2 February 2022 10	Sydney FC	2–0	Brisbane Roar	Sydney
19:45	Rojas 5'; Rule 49'	Report		Stadium: Leichhardt Oval; Attendance: 501; Referee: Georgia Ghirardello

13 February 2022 11	Newcastle Jets	0–1	Sydney FC	Newcastle
18:15		Report	Ibini 22'	Stadium: No. 2 Sportsground; Referee: Georgia Ghirardello

16 February 2022 9	Melbourne Victory	2–2	Sydney FC	Fraser Rise
20:05	Privitelli 68'; Zimmerman 90+2'	Report	Siemsen 50'; Ibini 60'	Stadium: City Vista Recreation Reserve; Attendance: 814; Referee: Rachael Mitchenson

20 February 2022 8	Melbourne City	2–1	Sydney FC	Melbourne
16:05	Pollicina 13'; McNamara 45+1'	Report	Ibini 79' (pen.)	Stadium: Kingston Heath Soccer Complex; Attendance: 1,019; Referee: Casey Reibelt

27 February 2022 13	Perth Glory	1–3	Sydney FC	Launceston
16:05	Keane 86'	Report	Tobin 34'; Vine 52', 60'	Stadium: University of Tasmania Stadium; Attendance: 692; Referee: Rebecca Mackie

6 March 2022 14	Adelaide United	0–1	Sydney FC	Adelaide
15:35		Report	Satchell 61'	Stadium: Coopers Stadium; Attendance: 1,173; Referee: Casey Reibelt

==== Finals series ====
11 March 2022 Semi-final	Sydney FC	4–2 (a.e.t.)	Melbourne City	Sydney
19:05	Vine 73', 113'; Rojas 91'; Hunter 97'	Report	Wilkinson 21', 58'	Stadium: Netstrata Jubilee Stadium; Attendance: 942; Referee: Georgia Ghirardello

27 March 2022 Grand final	Sydney FC	1–2	Melbourne Victory	Sydney
15:05	Vine 66'	Report	Jackson 49'; Zimmerman 64'	Stadium: Netstrata Jubilee Stadium; Attendance: 5,027; Referee: Lara Lee

== Awards ==
=== End of season awards ===
The following players received awards at the Sydney FC Sky Blue Ball for their achievements throughout the season:

- Player of the Season: Mackenzie Hawkesby
- Member's Player of the Season: Cortnee Vine
- U-20's Player of the Season: Taylor Ray
- Golden Boot: Cortnee Vine (9 goals)

== See also ==
- 2021–22 Sydney FC season
