= 2020–21 Sydney FC (women) season =

Sydney FC (W-League)
2020–21 season
- Manager: Ante Juric
- Stadium: Cromer Park, Jubilee Stadium, Leichhardt Oval, ANZ Stadium
- W-League: 1st
- Finals Series: Runners up
- Top goalscorer: League: Remy Siemsen (7); All: Remy Siemsen (7)
- Highest home attendance: 4,619 (11 April 2021 vs. Melbourne Victory
- Lowest home attendance: 1,111 (31 March 2021 vs. Melbourne Victory
Home colours	Away colours	Third colours

The 2020–21 Sydney FC W-League season was the club's thirteenth season in the W-League, the premier competition for women's football in Australia.

== Players ==
=== Squad information ===
As of 1 January 2021

Note: Flags indicate national team as defined under FIFA eligibility rules; some limited exceptions apply. Players may hold more than one non-FIFA nationality.

No.	Pos.	Nation	Player
1	GK	AUS	Jada Mathyssen-Whyman
2	MF	AUS	Teresa Polias (Captain)
3	DF	AUS	Charlotte McLean
4	DF	AUS	Elizabeth Ralston
5	DF	AUS	Ally Green
6	MF	AUS	Clare Wheeler
7	DF	AUS	Ellie Brush
8	MF	AUS	Rachel Lowe
9	FW	AUS	Allira Toby
10	FW	AUS	Remy Siemsen

No.	Pos.	Nation	Player
11	FW	AUS	Cortnee Vine
12	MF	AUS	Natalie Tobin
15	MF	AUS	Mackenzie Hawkesby
16	MF	AUS	Claudia Cholakian
17	DF	AUS	Angelique Hristodoulou
18	MF	AUS	Taylor Ray
19	DF	AUS	Charlize Rule
20	FW	AUS	Princess Ibini
30	GK	AUS	Katie Offer

== W-League ==
=== League table ===
Pos	Team	Pld	W	D	L	GF	GA	GD	Pts	Qualification
1	Sydney FC	12	9	1	2	26	11	+15	28	Qualification to Finals series
2	Brisbane Roar	12	7	4	1	29	12	+17	25	Qualification to Finals series
3	Melbourne Victory (C)	12	7	2	3	25	14	+11	23	Qualification to Finals series
4	Canberra United	12	6	4	2	21	16	+5	22	Qualification to Finals series
5	Adelaide United	12	7	1	4	22	18	+4	22	
6	Western Sydney Wanderers	12	4	1	7	13	21	−8	13	
7	Melbourne City	12	4	1	7	11	23	−12	13	
8	Newcastle Jets	12	2	1	9	14	21	−7	7	
9	Perth Glory	12	0	1	11	7	32	−25	1	

Source: A-Leagues
Rules for classification: 1) points; 2) goal difference; 3) number of goals scored.
(C) Champions

=== Matches ===
Win Draw Loss

30 December 2020 1	Western Sydney Wanderers FC	0–3	Sydney FC	Parramatta
16:35 ACST		Report	Vine 27'; Ibini 60', 86'	Stadium: Bankwest Stadium; Attendance: 3,027

8 February 2021 7	Sydney FC	4–0	Canberra United	Sydney
16:35 ACST	Hawkesby 16'; Vine 64'; Siemsen 72', 76'	Report		Stadium: Netstrata Jubilee Stadium; Attendance: 1,337

8 January 2021 3	Newcastle Jets	1–2	Sydney FC	Newcastle
16:35 ACST	Andrews 41'	Report	Ray 48'; Lowe 75'	Stadium: McDonald Jones Stadium; Attendance: 1,918

16 January 2021 4	Sydney FC	2–0	Western Sydney Wanderers FC	Sydney
19:35 ACST	Hawkesby 31'; Brush 66'	Report		Stadium: ANZ Stadium; Attendance: 2,500

31 January 2021 6	Sydney FC	2–0	Newcastle Jets	Sydney
18:00 ACST	Vine 32'; Siemsen 61'	Report		Stadium: Cromer Park; Attendance: 1,329

4 February 2021 7	Melbourne City	0–2	Sydney FC	Melbourne
19:05 ACST		Report	Siemsen 51'; Tobin 75'	Stadium: AAMI Park; Attendance: 0

14 February 2021 9	Sydney FC	1–4	Brisbane Roar	Sydney
16:05 ACST	Wheeler 11'	Report	Yallop 8'; Rankin 16', 82'; Polkinghorne 54'	Stadium: Leichhardt Oval; Attendance: 1,126

21 February 2021 10	Adelaide United	1–2	Sydney FC	Adelaide
16:00 ACST	McNamara 64'	Report	Siemsen 40'; Vine 48'	Stadium: Cromer Park; Attendance: 1,087

25 February 2021 11	Perth Glory	2–6	Sydney FC	Perth
21:30 ACST	Lowry 63', 65'	Report	Siemsen 44', 53'; Ibini 48', 90+5'; Wheeler 61', 71'	Stadium: Dorrien Gardens; Attendance: 510

6 March 2021 12	Adelaide United	2–0	Sydney FC	Adelaide
19:00 ACST	Waldus 5'; Weber 19'	Report		Stadium: Marden Sports Complex; Attendance: 987

26 March 2021 14	Canberra United	0–0	Sydney FC	Canberra
17:30 ACST		Report		Stadium: Viking Park; Attendance: 1,411

4 April 2021 13	Sydney FC	2–1	Melbourne Victory	Sydney
20:05 ACST	Polias 29'; Ibini 73' (pen.)	Report	Cooney-Cross 90+6'	Stadium: Cromer Park; Attendance: 1,111

=== Finals series ===
5 April 2021 Semifinals	Sydney FC	3–0	Canberra United	Sydney
15:00 AEST	Hawkesby 15'; Wheeler 64'; Green 73'	Report		Stadium: Netstrata Jubilee Stadium; Attendance: 2,044

11 April 2021 Grand final	Sydney FC	0–1	Melbourne Victory	Sydney
16:00 AEST		Report	Cooney-Cross 120'	Stadium: Netstrata Jubilee Stadium; Attendance: 4,619
