= 2019–20 Sydney FC (women) season =

Sydney FC (W-League)
2019–20 season
- Manager: Ante Juric
- Stadium: Cromer Park; Jubilee Stadium; Leichhardt Oval; WIN Stadium
- W-League: 3rd
- W-League Finals: Runners-up
Home colours	Away colours	Third colours

The 2019–20 Sydney FC W-League season was the club's twelfth season in the W-League, the premier competition for women's association football in Australia.

== Players ==
=== Squad information ===
As of 18 October 2019

Note: Flags indicate national team as defined under FIFA eligibility rules; some limited exceptions apply. Players may hold more than one non-FIFA nationality.

No.	Pos.	Nation	Player
1	GK	USA	Aubrey Bledsoe (on loan from Washington Spirit)
2	MF	AUS	Teresa Polias (Captain)
3	FW	AUS	Shadeene Evans
4	DF	AUS	Elizabeth Ralston
5	DF	AUS	Ally Green
6	MF	AUS	Chloe Logarzo
7	DF	AUS	Ellie Brush
9	FW	AUS	Caitlin Foord
10	FW	AUS	Remy Siemsen
11	FW	USA	Sofia Huerta (on loan from Houston Dash)

No.	Pos.	Nation	Player
12	MF	AUS	Natalie Tobin
13	FW	USA	Veronica Latsko (on loan from Houston Dash)
14	DF	AUS	Alanna Kennedy
15	MF	AUS	Mackenzie Hawkesby
17	MF	AUS	Angelique Hristodoulou
18	DF	AUS	Taylor Ray
19	MF	AUS	Amy Sayer
20	FW	AUS	Princess Ibini
30	GK	AUS	Trudy Burke

=== Transfers in ===
No.	Position	Player	Transferred from	Type/fee	Contract length	Date	Ref
	DF	Ellie Brush	Unattached	Free transfer		24 September 2019	
	MF	Mackenzie Hawkesbury				24 September 2019	
	FW	Remy Siemsen				24 September 2019	
	FW	(United States) Veronica Latsko	Houston Dash	Loan	1 year	18 October 2019	

=== Transfers out ===
No.	Position	Player	Transferred to	Type/fee	Date	Ref
7	DF	Rachel Soutar			24 September 2019	
8	MF	Amy Harrison		End of contract	24 September 2019	
10	FW	(United States) Savannah McCaskill	(United States) Sky Blue FC	Loan return	24 September 2019	
11	FW	Lisa De Vanna	(Italy) Fiorentina		24 September 2019	
21	DF	Julie Vignes			24 September 2019	
23	MF	(United States) Danielle Colaprico	(United States) Chicago Red Stars	Loan return	24 September 2019	

== W-League ==
=== League table ===
Pos	Team	Pld	W	D	L	GF	GA	GD	Pts	Qualification
1	Melbourne City (C)	12	11	1	0	27	4	+23	34	Qualification to Finals series
2	Melbourne Victory	12	7	2	3	24	14	+10	23	Qualification to Finals series
3	Sydney FC	12	7	1	4	21	13	+8	22	Qualification to Finals series
4	Western Sydney Wanderers	12	7	1	4	24	20	+4	22	Qualification to Finals series
5	Brisbane Roar	12	5	2	5	22	19	+3	17	
6	Canberra United	12	4	1	7	13	29	−16	13	
7	Perth Glory	12	3	2	7	19	24	−5	11	
8	Adelaide United	12	2	1	9	12	24	−12	7	
9	Newcastle Jets	12	2	1	9	12	27	−15	7	

Source: A-Leagues
Rules for classification: 1) points; 2) goal difference; 3) number of goals scored.
(C) Champions

=== Matches ===
Win Draw Loss

17 November 2019 1	Sydney FC	3–0	Melbourne Victory	Sydney
4:00pm AEDT	Siemsen 4', 22'; Evans 90+2'	Report		Stadium: Netstrata Jubilee Stadium; Attendance: 3,219; Referee: Kate Jacewicz

22 November 2019 2	Adelaide United	0–1	Sydney FC	Adelaide
7:30pm AEDT		Report	Foord 56'	Stadium: Marden Sports Complex; Attendance: 784; Referee: Isabella Blaess

1 December 2019 3	Perth Glory	1–3	Sydney FC	Perth
4:00pm AEDT	Doeglas 46'	Report	Siemsen 3', 6'; Foord 39' (pen.)	Stadium: Dorrien Gardens; Attendance: 797; Referee: Rachel Mitchenson

8 December 2019 4	Sydney FC	1–2	Melbourne City	Sydney
4:00pm AEDT	Huerta 40'	Report	van Egmond 3'; Mijatović 76'	Stadium: Cromer Park; Attendance: 2,690; Referee: Rachel Mitchenson

15 December 2019 5	Newcastle Jets	0–2	Sydney FC	Newcastle
4:00pm AEDT		Report	Siemsen 31', 50'	Stadium: McDonald Jones Stadium; Attendance: 2,513; Referee: Rachel Mitchenson

20 December 2019 6	Western Sydney Wanderers	5–0	Sydney FC	Sydney
5:00 pm AEDT	Harrison 4'; Cooney-Cross 6', 42'; Williams 76', 87'	Report		Stadium: Bankwest Stadium; Attendance: 2,233; Referee: Lara Lee

29 December 2019 7	Sydney FC	2–0	Adelaide United	Sydney
4:00pm AEDT	Brooks 77' (o.g.); Ibini 90'	Report		Stadium: Jubilee Oval; Attendance: 3,373; Referee: Kelly Jones

13 January 2020 (Note: Deferred from 5 January due to bushfire smoke.) 8	Canberra United	0–4	Sydney FC	Canberra
		Report	Siemsen 18'; Latsko 33'; Logarzo 49'; Huerta 83'	Stadium: McKellar Park; Attendance: 1,473; Referee: Lara Lee

16 January 2020 10	Sydney FC	0–0	Brisbane Roar	Sydney
7:30pm AEDT		Report		Stadium: Leichhardt Oval; Attendance: 1,397; Referee: Kelly Jones

15 February 2020 12	Sydney FC	3–0	Western Sydney Wanderers	Sydney
5:00 pm AEDT	Latsko 2'; Brush 14'; Huerta 90+2'	Report		Stadium: Cromer Park; Attendance: 2,309; Referee: Lara Lee

23 February 2020 13	Sydney FC	1–2	Perth Glory	Wollongong
4:00pm AEDT	K. Carroll 90+3' (o.g.)	Report	Andrews 41', 58'	Stadium: WIN Stadium; Referee: Kelly Jones

29 February 2020 14	Melbourne Victory	3–1	Sydney FC	Melbourne
5:00pm AEDT	Jackson 25'; Jenkins 49', 78'	Report	Tobin 90'	Stadium: Marvel Stadium; Attendance: 3,310; Referee: Casey Reibelt

14 March 2020 Semi-final	Melbourne Victory	0–1	Sydney FC	Melbourne
14:00 AEDT		Source	Latsko 14'	Stadium: Epping Stadium; Attendance: 704; Referee: Lara Lee

21 March 2020 Grand final	Melbourne City	1–0	Sydney FC	Melbourne
15:30 AEDT	Catley 15'	Report		Stadium: AAMI Park; Attendance: 0 (behind closed doors due to coronavirus outbreak); Referee: Rebecca Durcau
