= 2022–23 Sydney FC (women) season =

15th season in existence of Sydney FC (women)

Sydney FC (women)
2022–23 season
- Chairman: Scott Barlow
- Manager: Ante Juric
- A-League Women: 1st
- A-League Women Finals: Winners
- Top goalscorer: League: Madison Haley (8); All: Madison Haley (11)
- Highest home attendance: 4,293 vs. Brisbane Roar (10 December 2022); A-League Women
- Lowest home attendance: 414 vs. Perth Glory (29 March 2023); A-League Women
- Average home league attendance: 1,515
- Biggest win: 4–0 vs. Brisbane Roar (H) (10 December 2022); A-League Women; 4–0 vs. Newcastle Jets (H) (1 April 2023); A-League Women; 4–0 vs. Western United (N) (30 April 2023); A-League Women Finals
- Biggest defeat: 0–2 vs. Western United (A) (11 January 2023); A-League Women
Home colours	Away colours	Third colours

The 2022–23 season was the 15th in the history of Sydney Football Club (A-League Women).

== Players ==
=== First-team squad ===
Note: Flags indicate national team as defined under FIFA eligibility rules; some limited exceptions apply. Players may hold more than one non-FIFA nationality.

No.	Pos.	Nation	Player
1	GK	AUS	Jada Whyman
2	MF	AUS	Mary Stanic-Floody
3	DF	AUS	Charlotte McLean
4	DF	NZL	Anna Green
5	DF	AUS	Kirsty Fenton
6	MF	AUS	Sarah Hunter
7	MF	AUS	Teigan Collister
8	MF	AUS	Rachel Lowe
9	MF	USA	Madison Haley
10	FW	AUS	Remy Siemsen
11	FW	AUS	Cortnee Vine
12	DF	AUS	Natalie Tobin
14	FW	AUS	Abbey Lemon

No.	Pos.	Nation	Player
15	MF	AUS	Mackenzie Hawkesby
16	DF	IRL	Deborah-Anne De la Harpe
17	MF	AUS	Jynaya Dos Santos
19	MF	AUS	Charlize Rule
20	FW	AUS	Princess Ibini-Isei
21	MF	AUS	Shay Hollman
22	FW	AUS	Indiana Dos Santos
23	MF	AUS	Anika Stajcic
24	FW	AUS	Shay Evans
25	FW	USA	Rola Badawiya
26	DF	AUS	Margaux Chauvet
30	GK	AUS	Katie Offer

== Transfers ==
=== Transfers in ===
No.	Position	Player	Transferred from	Type/fee	Contract length	Date	Ref.
5	DF	Kirsty Fenton	Newcastle Jets	Free transfer	1 year	13 September 2022	
14	FW	Abbey Lemon	(Australia) Blacktown Spartans	Free transfer	2 years	13 September 2022	
17	MF	Jynaya Dos Santos	(Australia) FNSW Institute	Free transfer	1 year	13 September 2022	
16	DF	Deborah-Anne De la Harpe	Perth Glory	Free transfer	1 year	13 September 2022	
22	FW	Indiana Dos Santos	Unattached	Free transfer	1 year	13 September 2022	
23	MF	Anika Stajcic	Unattached	Free transfer	1 year	13 September 2022	
24	FW	Shadeene Evans	Adelaide United	Free transfer	1 year	14 October 2022	
4	DF	Anna Green	(New Zealand) Capital Football	Free transfer	1 year	14 October 2022	
9	MF	(United States) Madison Haley	(United States) Stanford Cardinal	Free transfer	1 year	14 October 2022	
10	FW	Remy Siemsen	(Sweden) AIK	Free transfer	1 year	23 November 2022	
60	GK	Tahlia Franco	Unattached	Free transfer	1 month	5 January 2023	
7	MF	Teigan Collister	Unattached	Free transfer	6 months	10 January 2023	
25	FW	(United States) Rola Badawiya	Unattached	Free transfer	6 months	10 January 2023	
40	GK	Jasmine Black	Unattached	Free transfer	5 months	9 March 2023	

=== Transfers out ===
No.	Position	Player	Transferred to	Type/fee	Date	Ref.
10	FW	Remy Siemsen	(Sweden) AIK	Free transfer	28 March 2022	
5	DF	Ally Green	(Norway) Vålerenga	Free transfer	4 April 2022	
14	FW	(New Zealand) Paige Satchell	Wellington Phoenix	Free transfer	20 July 2022	
16	FW	Kahli Johnson	Western United	Free transfer	10 August 2022	
7	DF	Ellie Brush	Canberra United	Free transfer	19 August 2022	
4	DF	Jessika Nash	Melbourne Victory	Free transfer	5 September 2022	
17	DF	Angelique Hristodoulou	Western Sydney Wanderers	Free transfer	6 October 2022	
13	DF	Natasha Prior	Unattached	Free transfer	17 November 2022	
9	DF	(Chile) María José Rojas	Melbourne City	Free transfer	17 November 2022	
10	FW	Remy Siemsen	(England) Leicester City	Undisclosed fee	29 December 2022	
40	GK	Jasmine Black	Unattached	Free transfer	5 January 2023	
60	GK	Tahlia Franco	Unattached	Free transfer	9 February 2023	
40	GK	Jasmine Black	Unattached	Free transfer	16 March 2023	
26	DF	Margaux Chauvet	Unattached	Free transfer	16 March 2023	

=== Contract extensions ===
No.	Position	Player	Duration	Date	Ref.
12	Natalie Tobin	Defender	2 years	13 September 2022	
20	Princess Ibini-Isei	Forward	2 years	13 September 2022	
15	Mackenzie Hawkesby	Midfielder	2 years	13 September 2022	
8	Rachel Lowe	Midfielder	1 year	13 September 2022	
6	Sarah Hunter	Midfielder	2 years	13 September 2022	
19	Charlize Rule	Midfielder	2 years	13 September 2022	
3	Charlotte McLean	Defender	2 years	13 September 2022	
30	Katie Offer	Goalkeeper	1 year	13 September 2022	
21	Shay Hollman	Midfielder	3 years	13 September 2022	
2	Mary Stanic-Floody	Midfielder	2 years	13 September 2022	
11	Cortnee Vine	Forward	1 year	23 September 2022	
1	Jada Whyman	Goalkeeper	1 year	23 September 2022	
18	Taylor Ray	Midfielder	1 year	23 September 2022	

== Competitions ==
=== Overall record ===
Competition	First match	Last match	Starting round	Final position	Record							
Competition	First match	Last match	Starting round	Final position	Pld	W	D	L	GF	GA	GD	Win %
A-League Women	20 November 2022	1 April 2023	Matchday 1	1st	18	13	1	4	43	15	+28	72.22
A-League Women Finals	16 April 2023	30 April 2023	Semi-finals	Winners	3	2	0	1	5	1	+4	66.67
Total					21	15	1	5	48	16	+32	71.43

Source: Soccerway

=== A-League Women ===
==== League table ====
Pos	Team	Pld	W	D	L	GF	GA	GD	Pts	Qualification
1	Sydney FC (C)	18	13	1	4	43	15	+28	40	Qualification to Finals series and 2023 AFC Women's Club Championship
2	Western United (Note: The APL awarded Western United a 3–0 win as a result of Brisbane Roar fielding an ineligible player, after the round 17 match had originally finished 2–0 for Brisbane.)	18	13	0	5	38	20	+18	39	Qualification to Finals series
3	Melbourne City	18	9	3	6	36	23	+13	30	Qualification to Finals series
4	Melbourne Victory	18	7	8	3	29	22	+7	29	Qualification to Finals series
5	Canberra United	18	8	5	5	35	30	+5	29	

Source: A-Leagues
Rules for classification: 1) points; 2) goal difference; 3) number of goals scored.
(C) Champions

==== Results summary ====
Overall								Home						Away					
Pld	W	D	L	GF	GA	GD	Pts	W	D	L	GF	GA	GD	W	D	L	GF	GA	GD
18	13	1	4	43	15	+28	40	8	0	1	25	3	+22	5	1	3	18	12	+6

Source: KEEPUP

==== Results by round ====
Round	1	2	3	4	5	6	7	8	9	16	12	13	14	15	10	17	18	19	11	20
Ground	A	H	A	H	B	H	B	A	A	A	A	H	A	A	H	H	A	H	H	H
Result	L	W	W	W	B	W	B	W	W	L	W	W	L	W	W	L	D	W	W	W
Position	9	6	3	2	4	2	2	2	1	1	3	1	2	2	3	2	2	1	3	1
Points	0	3	6	9	9	12	12	15	18	18	21	24	24	27	30	30	31	34	37	40

Source: KEEPUP
A = Away; H = Home; W = Win; D = Draw; L = Loss

==== Matches ====
Win Draw Loss

20 November 2022 1	Adelaide United	1–0	Sydney FC	Adelaide
15:30 ACDT	Murray 88'	Report		Stadium: ServiceFM Stadium; Attendance: 1,039; Referee: Georgia Ghirardello

26 November 2022 2	Sydney FC	2–0	Melbourne Victory	Sydney
15:00 AEDT	Haley 41'; Morrison 48' (o.g.)	Report		Stadium: Cromer Park; Attendance: 1,339; Referee: Georgia Ghirardello

3 December 2022 3	Western Sydney Wanderers	0–1	Sydney FC	Sydney
15:00 AEDT		Report	Siemsen 82'	Stadium: Marconi Stadium; Attendance: 626; Referee: Casey Reibelt

10 December 2022 4	Sydney FC	4–0	Brisbane Roar	Sydney
17:05 AEDT	Haley 33', 43'; Hunter 90+1'; Siemsen 90+3'	Report		Stadium: Allianz Stadium; Attendance: 4,293; Referee: Anna-Marie Keighley

24 December 2022 6	Sydney FC	2–0	Western Sydney Wanderers	Sydney
14:20 AEDT	Hawkesby 30' (pen.); Vine 34'	Report		Stadium: Allianz Stadium; Attendance: 1,071; Referee: Rebecca Durcau

31 December 2022 8	Brisbane Roar	1–4	Sydney FC	Brisbane
14:00 AEST	Norrie 69'	Report	Ibini-Isei 13'; Hunter 23'; Tobin 37'; Hawkesby 52'	Stadium: A.J. Kelly Park; Attendance: 992; Referee: Georgia Ghirardello

7 January 2023 9	Newcastle Jets	2–4	Sydney FC	Newcastle
15:00 AEDT	Konjarski 10'; Andrews 48'	Report	Haley 1'; Hunter 4'; Hawkesby 7'; Ibini-Isei 64' (pen.)	Stadium: Newcastle Number 2 Sports Ground; Attendance: 1,024; Referee: Anna-Marie Keighley

11 January 2023 16	Western United	2–0	Sydney FC	Melbourne
16:00 AEDT	Keane 18', 35'	Report		Stadium: City Vista Recreation Reserve; Attendance: 740; Referee: Katherine Margret

26 January 2023 12	Melbourne Victory	3–6	Sydney FC	Melbourne
16:05 AEDT	Madsen 42'; Privitelli 48'; Markovski 88' (pen.)	Report	Ibini-Isei 24', 36', 60'; Hawkesby 30'; Vine 48'; Haley 50'	Stadium: AAMI Park; Attendance: 1,307; Referee: Casey Reibelt

4 February 2023 13	Sydney FC	3–0	Melbourne City	Sydney
14:20 AEDT	Hunter 27'; Vine 47'; Haley 71'	Report		Stadium: Allianz Stadium; Attendance: 3,654; Referee: Rebecca Durcau

11 February 2023 14	Canberra United	2–1	Sydney FC	Canberra
15:00 AEDT	Heyman 4'; Brush 87'	Report	Badawiya 53'	Stadium: McKellar Park; Attendance: 943; Referee: Kelly Jones

26 February 2023 15	Wellington Phoenix	0–1	Sydney FC	Auckland
17:00 NZDT		Report	Lowe 47'	Stadium: North Harbour Stadium; Attendance: 1,182; Referee: Rachael Mitchenson

5 March 2023 10	Sydney FC	3–0	Western United	Sydney
19:00 AEDT	Lowe 51', 64'; Ibini-Isei 81'	Report		Stadium: Netstrata Jubilee Stadium; Attendance: 566; Referee: Lara Lee

11 March 2023 17	Sydney FC	0–1	Wellington Phoenix	Sydney
15:00 AEDT		Report	Taylor 32'	Stadium: Netstrata Jubilee Stadium; Attendance: 518; Referee: Caitlin Williams

18 March 2023 18	Melbourne City	1–1	Sydney FC	Melbourne
15:00 AEDT	Torpey 90+4'	Report	Vine 24'	Stadium: Kingston Heath Soccer Complex; Attendance: 463; Referee: Anna-Marie Keighley

25 March 2023 19	Sydney FC	3–0	Adelaide United	Sydney
15:00 AEDT	Lowe 14'; Tobin 67'; Hawkesby 79'	Report		Stadium: Netstrata Jubilee Stadium; Attendance: 441; Referee: Rachael Mitchenson

29 March 2023 11	Sydney FC	4–2	Perth Glory	Sydney
15:00 AEDT	I. Dos Santos 25'; Vine 47'; Haley 75'; Ibini-Isei 89'	Report	Jancevski 45' (pen.); Coleman 58'	Stadium: Leichhardt Oval; Attendance: 414; Referee: Casey Reibelt

1 April 2023 20	Sydney FC	4–0	Newcastle Jets	Sydney
17:05 AEDT	Hawkesby 16', 78'; Vine 90+1', 90+5'	Report		Stadium: Allianz Stadium; Attendance: 1,338; Referee: Isabella Blaess

==== Finals series ====
16 April 2023 Qualifying semi-final	Sydney FC	0–1	Western United	Sydney
17:45 AEST		Report	Keane 26'	Stadium: Allianz Stadium; Attendance: 3,680; Referee: Georgia Ghirardello

22 April 2023 Preliminary Final	Sydney FC	1–0	Melbourne Victory	Sydney
15:00 AEST	Haley 89'	Report		Stadium: Allianz Stadium; Attendance: 1,630; Referee: Isabella Blaess

30 April 2023 Grand Final	Western United	0–4	Sydney FC	Sydney
16:00 AEST		Report	Haley 4', 90+1'; Tobin 18'; Ibini-Isei 63' (pen.)	Stadium: CommBank Stadium; Attendance: 9,519; Referee: Casey Reibelt

== Statistics ==
=== Appearances and goals ===
Includes all competitions. Players with no appearances not included in the list.

No.	Pos.	Nat.	Name	A-League Women				Total	
No.	Pos.	Nat.	Name	Regular season		Finals series		Total	
No.	Pos.	Nat.	Name	Apps	Goals	Apps	Goals	Apps	Goals
1	GK	(Australia)	Jada Whyman	12	0	3	0	15	0
2	MF	(Australia)	Mary Stanic-Floody	1+11	0	0	0	12	0
3	DF	(Australia)	Charlotte McLean	13	0	3	0	16	0
4	DF	(New Zealand)	Anna Green	5+2	0	0	0	7	0
5	DF	(Australia)	Kirsty Fenton	11+3	0	3	0	17	0
6	MF	(Australia)	Sarah Hunter	18	4	3	0	21	4
7	MF	(Australia)	Teigan Collister	0+3	0	0	0	3	0
8	MF	(Australia)	Rachel Lowe	7+7	4	3	0	17	4
9	MF	(United States)	Madison Haley	9+3	8	2+1	3	15	11
11	FW	(Australia)	Cortnee Vine	18	7	3	0	21	7
12	DF	(Australia)	Natalie Tobin	16	2	3	1	19	3
14	FW	(Australia)	Abbey Lemon	0+7	0	0	0	7	0
15	MF	(Australia)	Mackenzie Hawkesby	17	6	3	0	20	6
16	DF	(Republic of Ireland)	Deborah-Anne De la Harpe	11+3	0	0+1	0	15	0
17	MF	(Australia)	Jynaya Dos Santos	0+1	0	0	0	1	0
19	MF	(Australia)	Charlize Rule	18	0	3	0	21	0
20	FW	(Australia)	Princess Ibini-Isei	18	7	3	1	21	8
21	MF	(Australia)	Shay Hollman	12+2	0	0+1	0	15	0
22	FW	(Australia)	Indiana Dos Santos	3+2	1	1+2	0	8	1
23	MF	(Australia)	Anika Stajcic	0+1	0	0	0	1	0
24	FW	(Australia)	Shadeene Evans	1	0	0	0	1	0
25	FW	(United States)	Rola Badawiya	1+6	0	0+2	0	9	0
30	GK	(Australia)	Katie Offer	4+1	0	0	0	5	0
60	GK	(Australia)	Tahlia Franco	2	0	0	0	2	0
Player(s) transferred out but featured this season
10	FW	(Australia)	Remy Siemsen	1+3	2	0	0	4	2

=== Disciplinary record ===
Includes all competitions. The list is sorted by squad number when total cards are equal. Players with no cards not included in the list.

Rank	No.	Pos.	Nat.	Name	A-League Women						Total		
Rank	No.	Pos.	Nat.	Name	Regular season			Finals series			Total		
Rank	No.	Pos.	Nat.	Name	Booked	(yellow card) (yellow-red card)	Sent off (straight red)	Booked	(yellow card) (yellow-red card)	Sent off (straight red)	Booked	(yellow card) (yellow-red card)	Sent off (straight red)
1	12	DF	(Australia)	Natalie Tobin	1	2	0	1	0	0	2	2	0
2	15	MF	(Australia)	Mackenzie Hawkesby	4	0	0	1	0	0	5	0	0
3	11	FW	(Australia)	Cortnee Vine	3	0	0	1	0	0	4	0	0
4	9	MF	(United States)	Madison Haley	3	0	0	0	0	0	3	0	0
5	3	DF	(Australia)	Charlotte McLean	2	0	0	0	0	0	2	0	0
5	5	DF	(Australia)	Kirsty Fenton	2	0	0	0	0	0	2	0	0
5	6	MF	(Australia)	Sarah Hunter	2	0	0	0	0	0	2	0	0
8	2	MF	(Australia)	Mary Stanic-Floody	1	0	0	0	0	0	1	0	0
8	16	DF	(Republic of Ireland)	Deborah-Anne De la Horpe	1	0	0	0	0	0	1	0	0
8	19	MF	(Australia)	Charlize Rule	0	0	0	1	0	0	1	0	0
8	20	FW	(Australia)	Princess Ibini-Isei	1	0	0	0	0	0	1	0	0
8	21	MF	(Australia)	Shay Hollman	1	0	0	0	0	0	1	0	0
8	25	FW	(United States)	Rola Badawiya	1	0	0	0	0	0	1	0	0
Total					22	2	0	4	0	0	26	2	0

=== Clean sheets ===
Includes all competitions. The list is sorted by squad number when total clean sheets are equal. Numbers in parentheses represent games where both goalkeepers participated and both kept a clean sheet; the number in parentheses is awarded to the goalkeeper who was substituted on, whilst a full clean sheet is awarded to the goalkeeper who was on the field at the start of play. Goalkeepers with no clean sheets not included in the list.

Rank	No.	Nat.	Goalkeeper	A-League Women		Total
Rank	No.	Nat.	Goalkeeper	Regular season	Finals series	Total
1	1	(Australia)	Jada Whyman	8	2	10
2	30	(Australia)	Katie Offer	1 (1)	0	1 (1)
3	60	(Australia)	Tahlia Franco	1	0	1
Total				10 (1)	2	12 (1)
