= 2017–18 Sydney FC (women) season =

Sydney FC (W-League)
2017–18 season
- Manager: Ante Juric
- Stadium: Allianz Stadium
- W-League: 2nd
- W-League finals series: Runners-up
- Top goalscorer: League: Lisa De Vanna, Kylie Ledbrook (5 goals); All: Lisa De Vanna, Kylie Ledbrook (6 goals)
- Highest home attendance: 4,229 vs. Newcastle Jets; 3 January 2018
- Lowest home attendance: 1,644 vs. Melbourne Victory; 2 December 2017
- Average home league attendance: 2,695
Home colours	Away colours	Third colours

The 2017–18 Sydney FC W-League season was the club's tenth season in the W-League, the premier competition for women's soccer in Australia. The team played home games at Allianz Stadium. The club was managed by Ante Juric.

== Players ==
=== Squad information ===
Note: Flags indicate national team as defined under FIFA eligibility rules; some limited exceptions apply. Players may hold more than one non-FIFA nationality.

No.	Pos.	Nation	Player
1	GK	AUS	Sham Khamis
2	MF	AUS	Teresa Polias (Captain)
3	FW	AUS	Remy Siemsen
4	DF	AUS	Elizabeth Ralston
5	MF	AUS	Ally Green
6	MF	AUS	Chloe Logarzo
7	DF	AUS	Rachael Soutar
8	DF	AUS	Amy Harrison
9	MF	AUS	Caitlin Foord
10	MF	AUS	Kylie Ledbrook
11	FW	AUS	Lisa De Vanna

No.	Pos.	Nation	Player
12	DF	AUS	Teigen Allen
13	DF	AUS	Georgia Yeoman-Dale
14	FW	NZL	Emma Rolston
15	DF	AUS	Caitlin Cooper
16	DF	USA	Emily Sonnett (on loan from Portland Thorns FC)
17	DF	AUS	Angelique Hristodoulou
18	DF	AUS	Taylor Ray
19	FW	AUS	Leena Khamis
20	FW	AUS	Princess Ibini
21	DF	AUS	Julia Vignes
29	GK	USA	Aubrey Bledsoe (on loan from Orlando Pride)
30	GK	AUS	Sheridan Rainey

=== Transfers in ===
No.	Pos.	Nat.	Name	Age	Moving from	Type	Transfer window	Ends	Transfer fee	Source
12	DF	(Australia)	Teigen Allen	23	Melbourne City	Transfer	Pre-season			
15	DF	(Australia)	Caitlin Cooper	29	Western Sydney Wanderers	Transfer	Pre-season		Free	
17	MF	(Australia)	Angelique Hristodoulou	15	Western Sydney Wanderers	Transfer	Pre-season		Free	
7	DF	(Australia)	Rachael Soutar	23		Transfer	Pre-season			
11	FW	(Australia)	Lisa De Vanna	33	South Melbourne	Transfer	Pre-season			
10	MF	(Australia)	Kylie Ledbrook	31		Transfer	Pre-season			
5	DF	(Australia)	Ally Green	19		Transfer	Pre-season			
18	DF	(Australia)	Taylor Ray	16		Transfer	Pre-season			
14	MF	(New Zealand)	Emma Rolston	20		Transfer	Pre-season			
21	FW	(Australia)	Julia Vignes	15		Transfer	Pre-season			
6	MF	(Australia)	Chloe Logarzo	22	Newcastle Jets	Transfer	Pre-season		Free	
16	DF	(United States)	Emily Sonnett	24	(United States) Portland Thorns FC	Loan	Pre-season		Free	
30	GK	(Australia)	Sheridan Rainey	17	(Australia) Blacktown Spartans	Transfer	Pre-season			
29	GK	(United States)	Aubrey Bledose	26	(United States) Orlando Pride	Loan	Mid-season		Free	
9	FW	(Australia)	Caitlin Foord	23	(Japan) Vegalta Sendai	Transfer	Mid-season		Free	

=== Transfers out ===
No.	Pos.	Nat.	Name	Age	Moving to	Type	Transfer window	Transfer fee	Source
7	MF	(Australia)	Nicola Bolger	24	Perth Glory	Transfer	Pre-season		
12	MF	(Australia)	Olivia Price	21	Western Sydney Wanderers	Transfer	Pre-season	Free	
22	GK	(Australia)	Claire Coelho	21	Newcastle Jets	Transfer	Pre-season	Free	
16	MF	(Australia)	Hannah Bacon		(Norway) SK Trondheims-Ørn	Transfer	Pre-season	Free	
15	GK	(Australia)	Sarah Easthope	21		Transfer	Pre-season		
5	FW	(Australia)	Gabe Marzano	25		Transfer	Pre-season		
10	FW	(Nigeria)	Francisca Ordega	24	(United States) Washington Spirit	Loan return	Pre-season		
21	MF	(Australia)	Pana Petratos			Transfer	Pre-season		
11	MF	(Australia)	Natalie Tobin	21		Transfer	Pre-season		
6	DF	(Australia)	Servet Uzunlar	28		Transfer	Pre-season		

== Managerial staff ==
As of 1 July 2017.

Position	Name
Head coach	(Australia) Ante Juric
Assistant coach	(Australia) Anthony Harb
Goalkeeping coach	(Australia) Elvis De Marchi

== Squad statistics ==
N	Pos.	Nat.	Name	Total					W-League					W-League finals series
N	Pos.	Nat.	Name	Apps	Goals	Yellow card	Second yellow card	Red card	Apps	Goals	Yellow card	Second yellow card	Red card	Apps	Goals	Yellow card	Second yellow card	Red card
1	GK	(Australia)	Sham Khamis	5	0	0	0	0	5+0	0	0	0	0	0+0	0	0	0	0
2	MF	(Australia)	Teresa Polias	14	1	3	0	0	12+0	1	2	0	0	2+0	0	1	0	0
3	FW	(Australia)	Remy Siemsen	13	4	1	0	0	6+5	4	1	0	0	0+2	0	0	0	0
4	DF	(Australia)	Elizabeth Ralston	14	0	0	0	0	12+0	0	0	0	0	2+0	0	0	0	0
5	MF	(Australia)	Ally Green	0	0	0	0	0	0+0	0	0	0	0	0+0	0	0	0	0
6	MF	(Australia)	Chloe Logarzo	11	3	2	0	0	9+0	3	1	0	0	2+0	0	1	0	0
7	DF	(Australia)	Rachael Soutar	7	0	0	0	0	4+2	0	0	0	0	0+1	0	0	0	0
8	MF	(Australia)	Amy Harrison	9	0	1	0	0	9+0	0	1	0	0	0+0	0	0	0	0
9	FW	(Australia)	Caitlin Foord	7	3	2	0	0	4+2	2	2	0	0	1+0	1	0	0	0
10	MF	(Australia)	Kylie Ledbrook	13	6	4	1	0	9+2	5	2	1	0	2+0	1	2	0	0
11	FW	(Australia)	Lisa De Vanna	12	6	0	0	0	10+0	5	0	0	0	2+0	1	0	0	0
12	DF	(Australia)	Teigen Allen	4	0	1	0	0	2+2	0	1	0	0	0+0	0	0	0	0
13	DF	(Australia)	Georgia Yeoman-Dale	14	0	0	0	0	11+1	0	0	0	0	2+0	0	0	0	0
14	FW	(New Zealand)	Emma Rolston	2	0	0	0	0	0+2	0	0	0	0	0+0	0	0	0	0
15	DF	(Australia)	Caitlin Cooper	14	1	2	0	0	10+2	1	2	0	0	2+0	0	0	0	0
16	DF	(United States)	Emily Sonnett	11	1	0	0	0	7+2	1	0	0	0	2+0	0	0	0	0
17	MF	(Australia)	Angelique Hristodoulou	5	0	0	0	0	1+4	0	0	0	0	0+0	0	0	0	0
18	DF	(Australia)	Taylor Ray	2	1	0	0	0	1+1	1	0	0	0	0+0	0	0	0	0
19	FW	(Australia)	Leena Khamis	13	0	2	0	0	2+9	0	1	0	0	1+1	0	1	0	0
20	FW	(Australia)	Princess Ibini	13	2	1	0	0	10+1	2	1	0	0	2+0	0	0	0	0
21	DF	(Australia)	Julia Vignes	4	0	0	0	0	1+1	0	0	0	0	0+2	0	0	0	0
29	GK	(United States)	Aubrey Bledsoe	9	0	0	0	0	7+0	0	0	0	0	2+0	0	0	0	0
30	GK	(Australia)	Sheridan Rainey	0	0	0	0	0	0+0	0	0	0	0	0+0	0	0	0	0

- Source: au.women.soccerway.com
- (yellow card) = Number of bookings; (second yellow card) = Number of sending offs after a second yellow card; (red card) = Number of sending offs by a direct red card.

== Competitions ==
=== W-League ===
==== League table ====
Pos	Team	Pld	W	D	L	GF	GA	GD	Pts	Qualification
1	Brisbane Roar	12	9	1	2	21	12	+9	28	Qualification to Finals series
2	Sydney FC	12	8	1	3	26	16	+10	25	Qualification to Finals series
3	Newcastle Jets	12	6	2	4	26	21	+5	20	Qualification to Finals series
4	Melbourne City (C)	12	6	2	4	20	15	+5	20	Qualification to Finals series
5	Canberra United	12	5	1	6	24	27	−3	16	
6	Perth Glory	12	4	2	6	25	27	−2	14	
7	Melbourne Victory	12	3	2	7	15	19	−4	11	
8	Western Sydney Wanderers	12	3	2	7	13	21	−8	11	
9	Adelaide United	12	3	1	8	15	27	−12	10	

Source: A-Leagues
Rules for classification: 1) points; 2) goal difference; 3) number of goals scored.
(C) Champions

==== Results summary ====
Overall								Home						Away					
Pld	W	D	L	GF	GA	GD	Pts	W	D	L	GF	GA	GD	W	D	L	GF	GA	GD
14	8	1	5	26	14	+12	25	4	1	3	15	6	+9	4	0	2	11	8	+3

Last updated: 4 February 2018.
Source: Competitive Matches

==== Results by round ====
Round	1	2	3	4	5	6	7	8	9	10	11	12	13	14
Ground	H	A	A	H	B	H	A	H	A	H	A	B	A	H
Result	L	L	L	W	✖	W	W	W	W	D	W	✖	W	W
Position	8	9	9	9	9	6	5	4	3	3	2	2	2	2

Updated to match(es) played on 4 February 2018. Source: Competitive Matches
A = Away; H = Home; B = Bye; W = Win; D = Draw; L = Loss

==== Matches ====
Win Draw Loss

27 October 2017 1	Sydney FC	1–3	Brisbane Roar	Sydney
17:20 AEST	Sonnett 80' (pen.)	Report	Gorry 1'; Toby 37', 84'	Stadium: Allianz Stadium; Attendance: 2,707; Referee: Katie Patterson

4 November 2017 2	Newcastle Jets	2–0	Sydney FC	Newcastle
17:00 AEDT	Orgill 2'; Gilliland 29'	Report		Stadium: McDonald Jones Stadium; Attendance: 2,011; Referee: Kelly Jones

12 November 2017 3	Canberra United	3–2	Sydney FC	Canberra
16:30 AEDT	Heyman 13', 85'; Pressley 78'	Report	Ledbrook 45+2' (pen.), 70' (pen.)	Stadium: McKellar Park; Attendance: 1,003; Referee: Casey Reibelt

18 November 2017 4	Sydney FC	3–2	Melbourne City	Sydney
17:00 AEDT	Ledbrook 45+2'; Polias 64'; Siemsen 90+1'	Report	Ralston 46' (o.g.); Crummer 53'	Stadium: Allianz Stadium; Attendance: 2,115; Referee: Lara Lee

2 December 2017 6	Sydney FC	2–0	Melbourne Victory	Sydney
16:00 AEDT	Ibini 3'; De Vanna 57'	Report		Stadium: Cromer Park; Attendance: 1,644; Referee: Casey Reibelt

2 December 2017 7	Western Sydney Wanderers	1–3	Sydney FC	Sydney
17:00 AEDT	Brush 41' (pen.)	Report	Siemsen 21', 24'; De Vanna 62'	Stadium: ANZ Stadium; Attendance: 8,449; Referee: Kelly Jones

15 December 2017 8	Sydney FC	3–0	Canberra United	Sydney
17:20 AEDT	De Vanna 30', 42'; Pressley 48' (o.g.)	Report		Stadium: Allianz Stadium; Attendance: 2,958; Referee: Casey Reibelt

29 December 2017 9	Adelaide United	1–2	Sydney FC	Adelaide
20:00 AEDT	Chidiac 55' (pen.)	Report	Ledbrook 26'; Foord 90+3'	Stadium: Marden Sports Complex; Attendance: 1,015; Referee: Katie Patterson

3 January 2018 10	Sydney FC	2–2	Newcastle Jets	Sydney
17:20 AEDT	Ledbrook 20'; Ibini 27'	Report	van Egmond 35' (pen.); G. Simon 89'	Stadium: Allianz Stadium; Attendance: 4,229; Referee: Lara Lee

14 January 2018 11	Perth Glory	0–2	Sydney FC	Perth
22:00 AEDT		Report	De Vanna 20'; Logarzo 48'	Stadium: Dorrien Gardens; Attendance: 846; Referee: Kate Jacewicz

26 January 2018 13	Melbourne Victory	1–2	Sydney FC	Melbourne
22:00 AEDT	Privitelli 49'	Report	Ray 4'; Logarzo 30'	Stadium: AAMI Park; Attendance: 6,045; Referee: Maddison Kennedy

4 February 2018 14	Sydney FC	4–1	Western Sydney Wanderers	Sydney
16:00 AEDT	Logarzo 25'; Foord 32'; Cooper 41'; Siemsen 46'	Report	Waldus 86'	Stadium: Seymour Shaw; Attendance: 2,519; Referee: Rachel Mitchenson

==== Finals series ====
10 February 2018 Semi-final	Sydney FC	3–2 (a.e.t.)	Newcastle Jets	Sydney
16:45 AEDT	Foord 9'; Ledbrook 35'; De Vanna 98'	Report	Gilliland 53'; Andrews 90+2'	Stadium: Leichhardt Oval; Attendance: 2,512; Referee: Lara Lee

18 February 2018 Grand final	Sydney FC	0–2	Melbourne City	Sydney
17:00 AEDT		Report	Fishlock 35'; Taylor 75'	Stadium: Allianz Stadium; Attendance: 6,025; Referee: Rebecca Durcau
