= 2016–17 Sydney FC (women) season =

Sydney FC W-League
2016–17 season
- Manager: Daniel Barrett
- Stadium: Allianz Stadium, Sydney; Lambert Park, Sydney
- W-League: 3rd
- W-League finals series: Semi-finals
- Top goalscorer: League: Remy Siemsen (6 goals); All: Remy Siemsen (6 goals)
- Highest home attendance: 4,178 vs Western Sydney Wanderers (13 November 2016)
- Lowest home attendance: 714 vs Brisbane Roar (23 December 2016)
- Average home league attendance: 1,557
Home colours	Away colours	Third colours

The 2016–17 Sydney FC season was the club's ninth season in the W-League, the premier competition for women's football in Australia. The team played home games at Lambert Park and Allianz Stadium.

They were eliminated in the semi-finals by Perth Glory of a 5–1 loss at nib Stadium.

== Players ==
=== Squad information ===
Note: Flags indicate national team as defined under FIFA eligibility rules; some limited exceptions apply. Players may hold more than one non-FIFA nationality.

No.	Pos.	Nation	Player
1	GK	AUS	Sham Khamis
2	MF	AUS	Teresa Polias
3	FW	AUS	Remy Siemsen
4	DF	AUS	Elizabeth Rolston
5	FW	AUS	Gabe Marzano
6	DF	AUS	Servet Uzunlar
7	MF	AUS	Nicole Bolger
8	MF	AUS	Amy Harrison
9	FW	AUS	Caitlin Foord
10	FW	NGR	Francisca Ordega

No.	Pos.	Nation	Player
11	MF	AUS	Natalie Tobin
12	MF	AUS	Olivia Price
13	DF	AUS	Georgia Yeoman-Dale
14	DF	AUS	Alanna Kennedy
15	GK	AUS	Sarah Easthope
16	MF	AUS	Hannah Bacon
17	FW	AUS	Kyah Simon
19	FW	AUS	Leena Khamis
20	FW	AUS	Princess Ibini
21	MF	AUS	Pana Petratos
22	GK	AUS	Claire Coelho

== Managerial staff ==
Position	Name
Head coach	Daniel Barrett
Team manager	
Assistant coach	Jaime Gomez

== Squad statistics ==
N	Pos.	Nat.	Name	Total					W-League					W-League finals series
N	Pos.	Nat.	Name	Apps	Goals	Yellow card	Second yellow card	Red card	Apps	Goals	Yellow card	Second yellow card	Red card	Apps	Goals	Yellow card	Second yellow card	Red card
1	GK	(Australia)	Sham Khamis	12	0	1	0	0	12+0	0	1	0	0	0+0	0	0	0	0
2	MF	(Australia)	Teresa Polias	12	1	6	0	0	11+0	1	5	0	0	1+0	0	1	0	0
3	FW	(Australia)	Remy Siemsen	12	6	1	0	0	7+4	6	1	0	0	1+0	0	0	0	0
4	DF	(Australia)	Elizabeth Rolston	13	0	1	0	0	12+0	0	1	0	0	1+0	0	0	0	0
5	FW	(Australia)	Gabe Marzano	3	0	0	0	0	0+3	0	0	0	0	0+0	0	0	0	0
6	DF	(Australia)	Servet Uzunlar	9	0	1	0	0	7+1	0	0	0	0	1+0	0	1	0	0
7	MF	(Australia)	Nicole Bolger	13	2	0	0	0	12+0	2	0	0	0	1+0	0	0	0	0
8	MF	(Australia)	Amy Harrison	3	0	0	0	0	0+2	0	0	0	0	0+1	0	0	0	0
9	FW	(Australia)	Caitlin Foord	10	2	2	1	0	8+1	2	2	1	0	1+0	0	0	0	0
10	FW	(Nigeria)	Francisca Ordega	6	1	2	0	0	5+1	1	2	0	0	0+0	0	0	0	0
11	MF	(Australia)	Natalie Tobin	9	0	0	0	0	7+2	0	0	0	0	0+0	0	0	0	0
12	MF	(Australia)	Olivia Price	11	0	0	0	0	2+8	0	0	0	0	0+1	0	0	0	0
13	DF	(Australia)	Georgia Yeoman-Dale	13	0	2	0	0	12+0	0	1	0	0	1+0	0	1	0	0
14	DF	(Australia)	Alanna Kennedy	12	2	1	1	0	11+0	2	1	1	0	1+0	0	0	0	0
15	GK	(Australia)	Sarah Easthope	1	0	0	0	0	0+1	0	0	0	0	0+0	0	0	0	0
16	MF	(Australia)	Hannah Bacon	4	0	0	0	0	2+2	0	0	0	0	0+0	0	0	0	0
17	FW	(Australia)	Kyah Simon	12	5	2	0	0	11+0	4	2	0	0	1+0	1	0	0	0
19	FW	(Australia)	Leena Khamis	13	3	1	0	0	12+0	3	1	0	0	1+0	0	0	0	0
20	FW	(Australia)	Princess Ibni	9	1	0	0	0	1+7	1	0	0	0	0+1	0	0	0	0
21	MF	(Australia)	Pana Petratos	0	0	0	0	0	0+0	0	0	0	0	0+0	0	0	0	0
22	GK	(Australia)	Claire Coelho	1	0	0	0	0	0+0	0	0	0	0	1+0	0	0	0	0

- Source: au.women.soccerway.com
- (yellow card) = Number of bookings; (second yellow card) = Number of sending offs after a second yellow card; (red card) = Number of sending offs by a direct red card.

== Competitions ==
=== W-League ===
==== League table ====
Pos	Team	Pld	W	D	L	GF	GA	GD	Pts	Qualification
1	Canberra United	12	7	2	3	33	21	+12	23	Qualification to Finals series
2	Perth Glory	12	7	2	3	22	18	+4	23	Qualification to Finals series
3	Sydney FC	12	7	1	4	22	16	+6	22	Qualification to Finals series
4	Melbourne City (C)	12	6	2	4	19	14	+5	20	Qualification to Finals series
5	Newcastle Jets	12	4	3	5	18	18	0	15	
6	Adelaide United	12	3	5	4	31	26	+5	14	
7	Brisbane Roar	12	4	1	7	15	21	−6	13	
8	Western Sydney Wanderers	12	4	1	7	14	29	−15	13	
9	Melbourne Victory	12	2	3	7	17	28	−11	9	

Source: A-Leagues
Rules for classification: 1) points; 2) goal difference; 3) number of goals scored.
(C) Champions

==== Results summary ====
Overall								Home						Away					
Pld	W	D	L	GF	GA	GD	Pts	W	D	L	GF	GA	GD	W	D	L	GF	GA	GD
12	7	1	4	22	16	+6	22	4	1	1	13	5	+8	3	0	3	9	11	−2

Source: Competitive Matches

==== Results by round ====
Round	1	2	3	4	5	6	7	8	9	10	11	12	13	14
Ground	A	H	A	H	A	A	B	H	A	H	H	B	H	A
Result	L	W	W	W	W	L	✖	W	W	W	D	✖	L	L
Position	7	5	2	2	2	2	4	2	1	1	1	1	1	3

Source: Competitive Matches
A = Away; H = Home; B = Bye; W = Win; D = Draw; L = Loss
