= Claudia Cholakian =

Armenian footballer (born 1996)

Claudia Cholakian Կլաուդիա Չոլակյան (Armenian)
Personal information
- Full name: Claudia Louise Cholakian
- Date of birth: 29 July 1996 (age 30)
- Place of birth: Australia
- Position: Midfielder

Team information
- Current team: Actonians

Senior career*
Years	Team	Apps	(Gls)
2016–2020	Manly United		
2020–2021	Sydney FC	2	(0)
2021–2022	Sydney Olympic	15	(7)
2023	Northern Tigers	23	(10)
2024	Gladesville Ravens	16	(3)
2025–	Actonians	2	(0)

International career
2022–	Armenia	11	(0)
- * Club domestic league appearances and goals as of 21 August 2024

Claudia Louise Cholakian (Armenian: Կլաուդիա Լուիս Չոլակյան; born 29 July 1996) is a footballer who plays as a midfielder for FA Women's National League Division One, South East club Actonians. Born in Australia, she is a member of the Armenia women's national team.

== Club career ==
=== Youth career ===
Cholakian played her youth football for NWS Spirit and Northern Tigers, before joining Manly United as a 17-year-old.

=== Manly United ===
Cholakian started her career with Australian second-tier side Manly United, making her first grade debut in 2016 as a 19-year-old. In 2017, she spent the year abroad studying at King's College London in England as part of an exchange program with her university, missing the 2017 season as a result. Cholakian returned to play for Manly United for the 2018 season. Cholakian won the Coaches' Award for Manly's first grade side in 2018.

Between 2018 and 2020, Cholakian was the only player to feature for Manly in every single game, totalling 58 consecutive appearances for the club. Cholakian played in Manly's 2020 Championship winning team, playing the full 90 minutes in the Grand Final victory over Sydney University.

In late 2020, Cholakian was chosen to represent Football NSW in an exhibition 'State of Origin' match against Football Queensland, winning selection due to her strong form in the NPL NSW competition.

=== Sydney FC ===
In 2020, Cholakian received her big break in signing for Australian top flight club Sydney FC, competing in the W-League. Cholakian was signed as an injury replacement for Elizabeth Ralston in the lead up to the finals. Cholakian made two appearances for Sydney FC, and was part of their 2020-21 W-League championship.

=== Sydney Olympic ===
In 2021, Cholakian signed for Sydney Olympic in the Australian second tier. Cholakian spent two seasons at Sydney Olympic, also making her international debut with Armenia during her time at Olympic.

=== Northern Tigers ===
For the 2023 season, Cholakian re-joined Northern Tigers, a club in which she had previously played junior football at. Cholakian topped the Tigers' goal scoring charts for the season, finishing the season with 10 in the league, and 12 in all competitions. Cholakian was part of the Tigers' run to the inaugural Sapphire Cup final, scoring a goal and providing an assist in the semi final. Cholakian played in the final, unfortunately falling to a 2–1 defeat to APIA Leichhardt.

=== Gladesville Ravens ===
For the 2024 season, Cholakian moved to Gladesville Ravens. Cholakian made her first league start for the club against her previous club, Northern Tigers, at Christie Park on 21 April 2024.

=== Actonians ===
In August 2025, Cholakian signed for Actonians.

== International career ==
Cholakian represents Armenia at the international level, making her debut in 2022 in a FIFA Women's World Cup qualifier. Cholakian has so far made 11 appearances for the senior national team.

== Personal life ==
Cholakian completed a master's degree in sustainability at the University of Sydney and is currently employed as a sustainability advisor for property developer Frasers Property. Cholakian is the younger sister of Brendan Cholakian, who currently plays for Rockdale Ilinden in the men's National Premier Leagues NSW competition. Brendan also was playing for Manly United when Claudia made her senior debut, and moved to Sydney Olympic in the same year Claudia did.
