= Remy Siemsen =

Australian soccer player (born 1999)

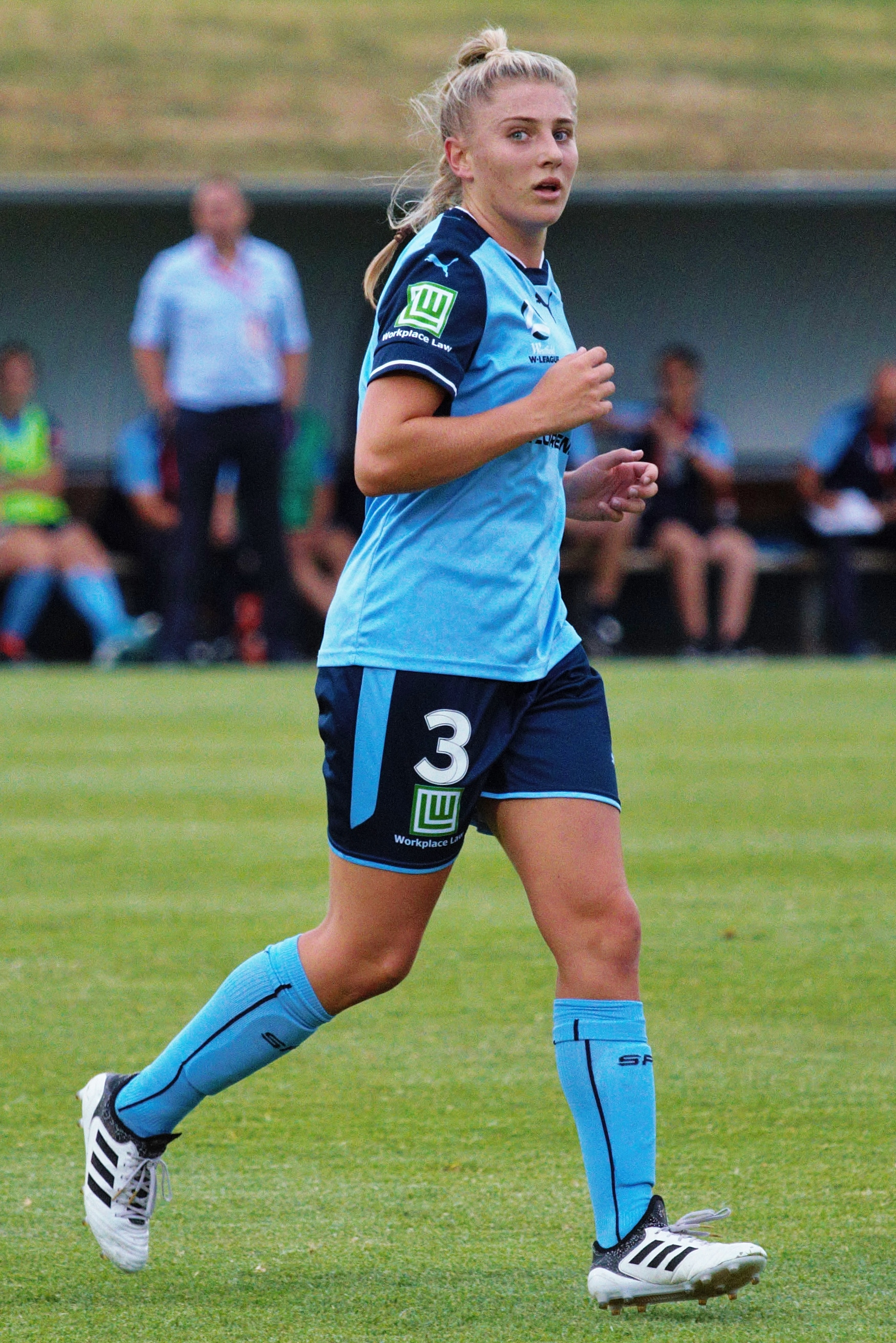
- Siemsen with Sydney FC in 2017

Personal information
- Full name: Remy Dianne Siemsen
- Date of birth: 10 November 1999 (age 27)
- Place of birth: St Leonards, New South Wales, Australia
- Height: 1.62 m (5 ft 4 in)
- Position: Forward

Team information
- Current team: Rosengård
- Number: 10

Youth career
- Manly United

Senior career*
Years	Team	Apps	(Gls)
2015–2016	Manly United	50	(42)
2016–2018	Sydney FC	25	(10)
2018	California Storm	8	(9)
2018–2019	Western Sydney Wanderers	11	(0)
2019–2022	Sydney FC	40	(19)
2022	AIK	21	(3)
2022	Sydney FC	4	(2)
2023–2024	Leicester City	16	(1)
2024–2025	Kristianstad	38	(8)
2026–	Rosengård	3	(1)

International career^{‡}
2016–2017	Australia U20	6	(13)
2021–	Australia	19	(0)
- * Club domestic league appearances and goals as of 30 April 2026 ‡ National team caps and goals as of 10 October 2026

Remy Dianne Siemsen (/ˈsiːmsən/ SEEM-sən; German: [ˈziːmzən]; born 10 November 1999) is an Australian professional soccer player who plays as a forward for Rosengård in the Swedish Damallsvenskan and the Australia national team. Following her debut season in the W-League at the age of 16, she was named W-League Young Footballer of the Year.

== Early life ==
Siemsen attended Oxford Falls Grammar School. She played junior football for BTH Raiders. Siemsen was selected for the Australian School Girls Squad and represented Football NSW at the National Training Centre (NTC) Challenge. At age 16, she was named Football NSW NPL Women's Player of the Year.

== Club career ==
=== Sydney FC ===
Siemsen made her debut for Sydney FC during the 2016–17 season at the age of 16. Sydney finished in third place during the regular season with a 7–4–1 record and advanced to the semi-finals where they were eliminated by Perth Glory. Siemsen finished her first season with six goals, ranking as the club's top scorer. She was named the league's Young Footballer of the Year in May 2017. She was named the 2016 Junior Sports Star by the Manly Daily.

Returning to Sydney for the 2017–18 season, Siemsen scored the game-winning goal coming off the bench as a substitute against former champions Melbourne City on 18 November. Siemsen finished off the 2017–18 season with 4 goals and a grand final finish with her Sydney FC team.

=== California Storm ===
In April 2018, Siemsen joined Women's Premier Soccer League (WPSL) side California Storm on a short-term contract. In her first game as a Storm player, she scored a brace in a 3–2 loss to Fresno FC. She was named WPSL West Region Player of the Week in Week 3 after tallying two goals and one assist on the road against Primero de Mayo. On 23 June, she scored a hat-trick in a 4–1 victory against the MVLA Wolves. She finished the season with 9 goals and 5 assists in 8 appearances.

=== Western Sydney Wanderers ===
In September 2018, Siemsen signed with Western Sydney Wanderers.

=== Sydney FC ===
In the 2019 off-season, Siemsen returned to Sydney FC. She marked he return during the first match of the 2019–20 season by scoring a brace in a 3–0 victory over Melbourne Victory. Following that performance and her performance in Sydney FC's 1–0 victory over Adelaide United the following week, she was named the Player of the Month for November. Siemsen scored seven goals during the season and won the W-League Golden Boot in a four-way tie with foreign players Morgan Andrews, Natasha Dowie, and Kristen Hamilton. In August 2020, Siemsen re-signed with Sydney FC ahead of the 2020–21 W-League season. Over the season, Siemsen scored another seven goals, winning Sydney FC's Golden Boot for the third time, and in August 2021 re-signed with the club for the 2021–22 A-League Women season.

=== AIK ===
In March 2022, Siemsen joined a European club for the first time, signing with Swedish club AIK.

=== Sydney FC ===
In November 2022, after the 2022–23 A-League Women had already started, Siemsen returned to Sydney FC following the conclusion of the 2022 Damallsvenskan. Over the course of a month, Siemsen scored two goals in four months, after which she transferred to a European club on a domestic record transfer fee.

=== Leicester City ===
A couple of weeks after Sydney FC announced her departure, it was revealed that Siemsen had signed with English Women's Super League club Leicester City.

== International career ==
Siemsen has represented Australia on the under-20 national team and competed at the 2017 AFC U-19 Women's Championship qualification tournament in 2016. She scored ten goals in two games during the qualifying tournament, seven against the Northern Mariana Islands and three against Jordan. She was subsequently named player of the tournament. During the 2017 AFC U-19 Women's Championship, Siemsen scored a goal against Vietnam, Japan and South Korea in consecutive games to advance Australia to the semi-finals for the first time in 11 years.

Siemsen made her full international debut for Australia against Brazil in October 2021.

== Career statistics ==
=== Club ===
As of match played 25 April 2026

Appearances and goals by club, season and competition
Club	Season	League			National Cup (Note: Includes Svenska Cupen, Women's FA Cup)		League Cup (Note: Includes FA Women's League Cup)		Total	
Club	Season	Division	Apps	Goals	Apps	Goals	Apps	Goals	Apps	Goals
Sydney FC	2016–17	A-League	12	6	—		—		12	6
Sydney FC	2017–18	A-League	13	4	—		—		13	4
Sydney FC	Total		25	10	—		—		25	10
California Storm	2018	WPSL	8	9	—		—		8	9
Western Sydney Wanderers	2018–19	A-League	11	0	—		—		11	0
Sydney FC	2019–20	A-League	14	7	—		—		14	7
Sydney FC	2020–21	A-League	14	7	—		—		14	7
Sydney FC	2021–22	A-League	12	5	—		—		12	5
Sydney FC	Total		40	19	—		—		40	19
AIK	2022	Damallsvenskan	21	3	1	0	—		22	3
Sydney FC	2022–23	A-League	4	2	—		—		4	2
Leicester City	2022–23	Women's Super League	10	1	0	0	0	0	10	1
Leicester City	2023–24	Women's Super League	6	0	1	0	3	0	10	0
Leicester City	Total		16	1	1	0	3	0	10	1
Kristianstads DFF	2024	Damallsvenskan	12	5	0	0	—		12	5
Kristianstads DFF	2025	Damallsvenskan	26	3	3	1	—		29	4
Kristianstads DFF	Total		38	8	3	1	—		41	9
AIK	2026	Damallsvenskan	3	1	1	0	—		4	1
Career Total			167	53	6	1	4	0	177	44

=== International ===
As of match played 9 October 2026

Appearances and goals by national team and year
National team	Year	Apps	Goals
Australia
Australia	2021	2	0
Australia	2022	4	0
Australia	2023	0	0
Australia	2024	2	0
Australia	2025	6	0
Australia	2026	5	0
Total		19	0

== Honours ==
=== Individual ===
- Football NSW NPL Women's Player of the Year: 2016
- W-League Young Footballer of the Year: 2016
- PFA Young Women's Footballer of the Year nominee: 2017
- Football NSW NPL Women's Player of the year: 2017
- Football NSW NPL Player of the Final: 2017
