= Amy Harrison =

Australian international football (soccer) player

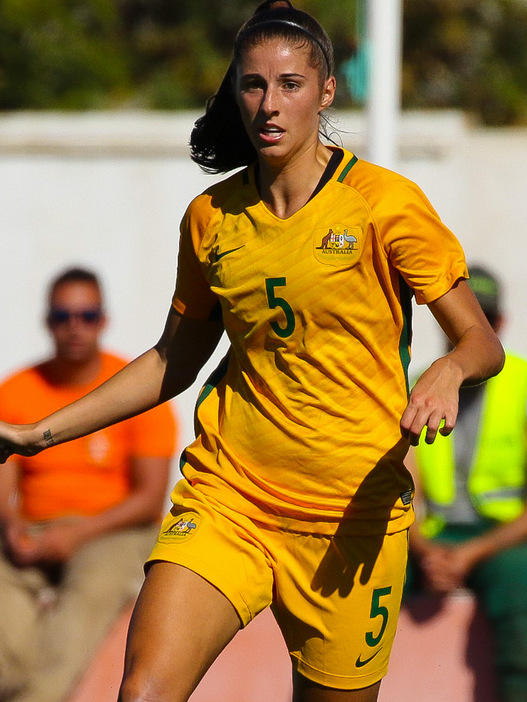
- Harrison playing for the Matildas at the 2017 Algarve Cup

Personal information
- Full name: Amy Bianca Harrison
- Date of birth: 21 April 1996 (age 30)
- Place of birth: Camden, New South Wales, Australia
- Height: 1.71 m (5 ft 7 1/2 in)
- Position: Midfielder

Senior career*
Years	Team	Apps	(Gls)
2012–2019	Sydney FC	54	(3)
2019	Washington Spirit	10	(0)
2019–2020	Western Sydney Wanderers	13	(2)
2020–2022	PSV	34	(0)
2022–2026	Western Sydney Wanderers	40	(5)

International career^{‡}
2011	Australia U17	7	(2)
2015–	Australia	13	(0)
- * Club domestic league appearances and goals as of 28 May 2024 ‡ National team caps and goals as of 15 April 2020

Amy Bianca Harrison (born 21 April 1996) is an Australian international football (soccer) player, who last played for Western Sydney Wanderers in the A-League Women and the Australian national team, the former of which she captains.

== Club career ==
=== Sydney FC ===
Harrison signed with Sydney FC of the Australian W-League in 2012. She made her professional debut at 16 years old in a 4–0 victory over Adelaide United.

After not playing in 2016 due to an anterior cruciate ligament injury, Harrison rejoined Sydney FC in January 2017. In 2018–19 she was in a Sydney FC squad that won the W-League Grand Final.

=== Washington Spirit ===
In February 2019, Harrison signed with the Washington Spirit in the NWSL ahead of the 2019 season, joining fellow Sydney FC teammate, Chloe Logarzo who signed a loan deal the same day.

=== Western Sydney Wanderers ===
On 23 October 2019 Harrison signed for cross town Sydney rivals, the Western Sydney Wanderers.

=== Return to Western Sydney Wanderers ===
In August 2026, Harrison departed the club.

== International ==
On 6 May 2014, Harrison was selected in the 2014 AFC Women's Asian Cup Australian team.

On 14 May 2019, Harrison was selected in the 2019 FIFA Women's World Cup Australian team.

== Career statistics ==
=== Club ===
As of July 20, 2020

Club	Season	League			Cup^{1}		Continental^{2}		Total	
Club	Season	Division	Apps	Goals	Apps	Goals	Apps	Goals	Apps	Goals
Sydney FC	2012–13	W-League	1	0	—		—		1	0
Sydney FC	2013–14	W-League	11	1	—		—		11	1
Sydney FC	2014	W-League	11	2	—		—		11	2
Sydney FC	2015–16	W-League	8	0	—		—		8	0
Sydney FC	2016–17	W-League	3	0	—		—		3	0
Sydney FC	2017–18	W-League	9	0	—		—		9	0
Sydney FC	2018–19	W-League	11	0	—		—		11	0
Sydney FC	Total		54	3	—		—		54	3
Washington Spirit	2019	NWSL	10	0	—		—		10	0
Western Sydney Wanderers	2019–20	W-League	13	2	—		—		13	2
PSV Eindhoven	2020–21	Eredivisie	19	0	6	1	2	0	27	1
PSV Eindhoven	2021–22	Eredivisie	15	0	4	0	2	0	21	0
Career total			111	5	10	1	4	0	125	6

^{1}KNVB Women's Cup.

^{2}UEFA Women's Champions League

== Honours ==
Sydney FC

- W-League Championship: 2012–13
- W-League Championship: 2018–19

Individual

- W-League Young Player of the Year: 2014
