= Cortnee Vine =

Australian soccer player (born 1998)

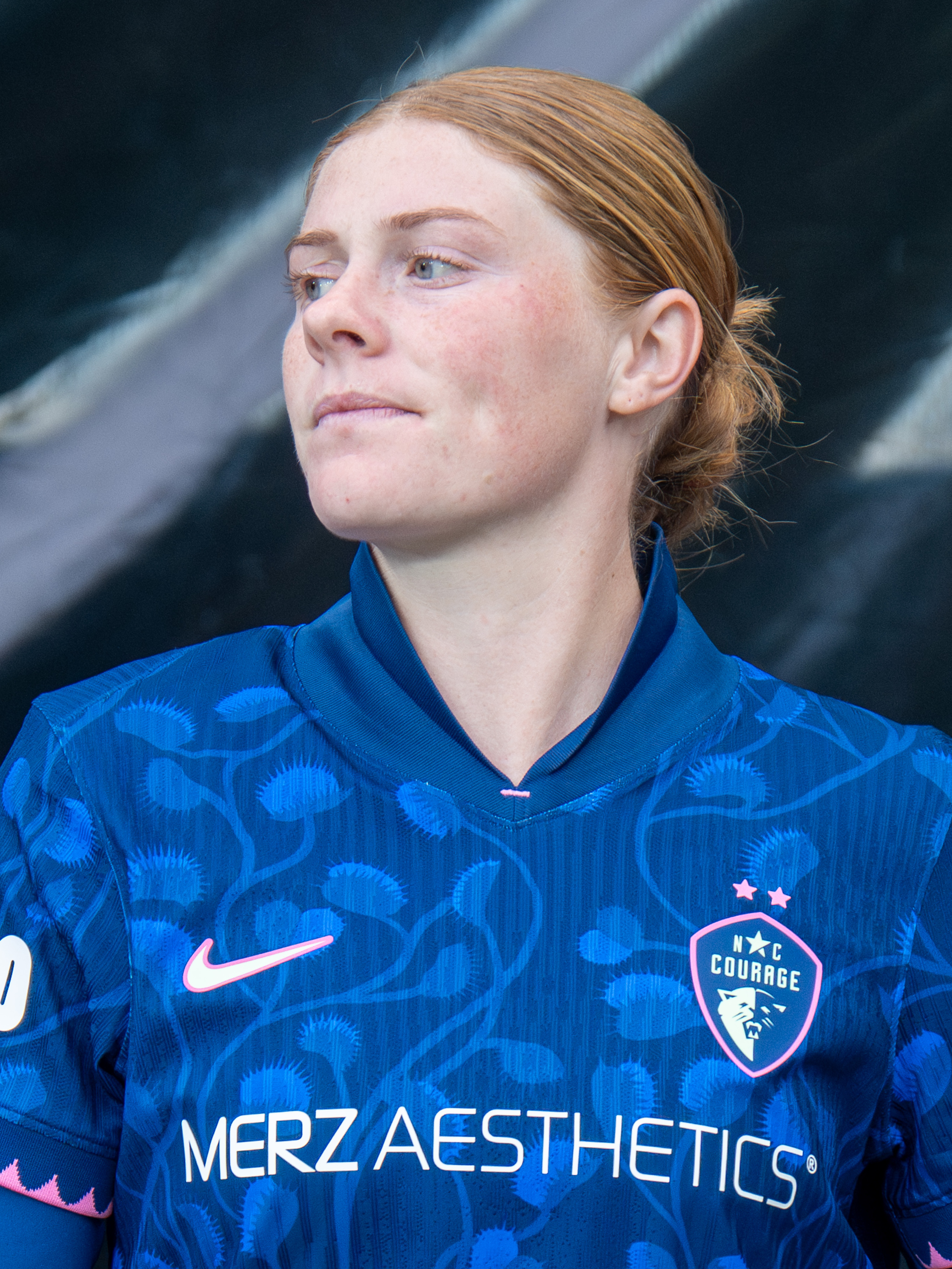
- Vine with the North Carolina Courage in 2026

Personal information
- Full name: Cortnee Brooke Vine
- Date of birth: 9 April 1998 (age 28)
- Place of birth: Shepparton, Victoria, Australia
- Height: 1.67 m (5 ft 6 in)
- Position: Winger

Team information
- Current team: Melbourne City
- Number: 9

Senior career*
Years	Team	Apps	(Gls)
2015–2017	Brisbane Roar	10	(0)
2017–2019	Newcastle Jets	21	(4)
2019–2020	Western Sydney Wanderers	12	(2)
2020–2024	Sydney FC	65	(30)
2022	→ Sydney Olympic (loan)	13	(5)
2024–2026	North Carolina Courage	22	(2)
2026–	Melbourne City	0	(0)

International career^{‡}
- Australia U-17
2016–2018	Australia U-20	11	(6)
2022–	Australia	30	(3)
- * Club domestic league appearances and goals as of 3 June 2026 ‡ National team caps and goals as of 17 December 2024

Cortnee Brooke Vine (born 9 April 1998) is an Australian professional soccer player who plays as a winger for Melbourne City in the A-League Women and the Australia national team. She has previously played for Brisbane Roar, Newcastle Jets, Western Sydney Wanderers, and Sydney FC, in addition to the North Carolina Courage of the National Women's Soccer League (NWSL). Vine represented Australia at under-17 and under-20 level before making her senior debut at the 2022 AFC Women's Asian Cup.

== Early life and education ==
Vine was born on 9 April 1998, in Shepparton, Victoria, to parents Heidi and Gary Vine. She began playing football at the age of five, alongside her brother Jayden, at St Georges Road Primary School. When Vine was seven, her family moved to Mango Hill, a northern suburb of Brisbane, Queensland. She continued her football with Deception Bay Dragons and Redcliffe Dolphins, initially playing on her older brother's team.

She attended Clontarf Beach State High School. By the age of 12, she had earned a spot at the Queensland Academy of Sport and was playing for Peninsula Power before eventually signing for Brisbane Roar in 2015.

== Club career ==
=== Brisbane Roar ===
Vine made her debut for the Brisbane Roar on 25 October 2015 in the W-League (later renamed A-League Women) at age 16 in a match against the Western Sydney Wanderers. She made seven appearances for the team during the 2015–16 W-League season. Brisbane finished in fourth place in the regular season, securing a berth to the play-offs. In the semi-finals against regular season champions Melbourne City, the Roar lost 5–4 on penalties after 120 minutes of regular and extra time produced no goals for either side.

=== Newcastle Jets ===
Vine joined the Newcastle Jets ahead of the 2017–18 W-League season.

=== Western Sydney Wanderers ===
In November 2019, Vine joined the Western Sydney Wanderers.

=== Sydney FC ===
In August 2020, Vine joined Sydney FC. In the 2020/21 season she made 11 appearances with four goals and three assists. Her team won the league. In the following 2021/22 season she contributed a total of six goals in 10 games. In the two playoff games, she scored another three goals, and she and her teammates became premiers again. She won the championship and premiership double with her club in the 2022/23 season, scoring seven goals in 21 games.

On 14 June 2024, Sydney announced that Vine would leave the club to pursue an opportunity in the NWSL in the United States.

=== North Carolina Courage ===
The North Carolina Courage signed Vine on a three-year contract on 14 June 2024, with her becoming eligible at the start of the transfer window on 1 August. She made her NWSL debut in the starting lineup against the Seattle Reign on 25 August. She scored her first NWSL goal in her Courage home debut, equalizing in an eventual 2–1 win over the Kansas City Current on 1 September.

On 2 June 2026, Vine and the Courage agreed to a mutual contract termination.

=== Melbourne City ===
On 11 August 2026, Vine returned to Australia, signing with Melbourne City for the 2026–27 season.

== International career ==
Vine has represented Australia at under-17 and under-20 level. In July 2016, she scored the equaliser against Myanmar at the 2016 AFF Women's Championship as Australia went on to top their group. On 24 January 2022, she made her first appearance for the senior team against the Philippines at the 2022 AFC Women's Asian Cup.

In July 2023, Vine was selected as part of the Matildas squad for the 2023 FIFA Women's World Cup. In August 2023, she scored the winning penalty kick in a 7–6 shootout win over France, to take Australia into the semifinals of the competition.

In February 2024, it was announced that Vine had withdrawn from selection for the Olympic qualifying matches against Uzbekistan, citing personal reasons. She was called up again to the Matildas squad for friendly matches against Mexico in April 2024, alongside fellow Sydney FC player Jada Whyman.

On 4 June 2024, Vine was named in the Matildas team which qualified for the Paris 2024 Olympics, her debut Olympics selection.

== Personal life ==
Since 2019 and as of January 2024, Vine has been in a relationship with Charlotte McLean, her teammate at Sydney FC and the North Carolina Courage.

During the COVID-19 pandemic (2020–21), Vine learnt computer coding via online courses, and in 2023 was studying part-time for a bachelor's degree in information technology.

On 15 November 2024, Vine announced that she was going to take some time off football to prioritise her mental health. By March 2025, she returned to her club's regular roster.

== International goals ==
No.	Date	Venue	Opponent	Score	Result	Competition
1.	8 October 2022	Kingsmeadow, Kingston upon Thames, England	South Africa	1–0	4–1	Friendly
2.	8 October 2022	Kingsmeadow, Kingston upon Thames, England	South Africa	2–0	4–1	Friendly
3.	19 February 2023	CommBank Stadium, Sydney, Australia	Spain	1–0	3–2	2023 Cup of Nations

== Honours ==
Sydney FC

- W-league Premiership: 2020–21, 2021–22, 2022–23
- W-league Championship: 2022–23

Australia

- FFA Cup of Nations: 2023
