= Sarah Hunter (soccer) =

Australian soccer player (born 2003)

Personal information
- Full name: Sarah Rose Hunter
- Date of birth: 7 October 2003 (age 23)
- Place of birth: Sydney, New South Wales, Australia
- Position: Midfielder

Team information
- Current team: Sydney FC
- Number: 21

Youth career
- Football NSW-FNSW Institute

Senior career*
Years	Team	Apps	(Gls)
2020–2021	Western Sydney Wanderers	9	(2)
2021–2023	Sydney FC	37	(5)
2023–2025	Paris FC	14	(0)
2025–	Sydney FC	0	(0)

International career^{‡}
2022	Australia U20	8	(6)
2022	Australia U23	4	(1)
2023–	Australia	1	(0)
- * Club domestic league appearances and goals as of 17 December 2024 ‡ National team caps and goals as of 17 December 2024

Sarah Rose Hunter (born 7 October 2003) is an Australian soccer player who plays for Sydney FC in the A-League Women. She has previously played for the Western Sydney Wanderers and for Paris FC in the Division 1 Féminine.

== Early life ==
Hunter grew up in New South Wales and played for Northbridge FC and the FNSW Institute in her youth.. She was not able to play much from age 10 to 16 due to having two hip surgeries, a broken ankle, and ACL reconstruction. Her schooling was at Pymble Ladies' College where she excelled at soccer.

== Club career ==
=== Western Sydney Wanderers ===
In December 2020, Hunter joined A-League club Western Sydney Wanderers ahead of the 2020–21 W-League season. Making her debut in the A-league for the club in a 4–1 loss to Newcastle Jets, coming on in the 75th minute for Julie-Ann Russell. Three games into her first professional season, 17 year old Hunter scored her first two A-league goals in a 2-2 draw against Adelaide United.

=== Sydney FC ===
September 2021, Hunter joined A-League club Sydney FC.

March 2022 Hunter scores her first Sydney goal against Melbourne City.

In 2022, 18 year old Hunter was part of the 2021-22 Premiership team-topping ladder for record breaking fourth time.

April 2023, 19 year old Hunter was part of the 2022-23 Premiership team who were crowned Liberty A-league Champions beating Western United 4-0 in the Grand Final, in front of a record crowd at Western Sydney Stadium.

June 2023, Hunter awarded the Sydney FC Under 20's Player of the Year

=== Paris FC ===
In July 2023, Hunter joined French club Paris FC on a three-year contract.

=== Return to Sydney FC ===
In October 2025, after two years in France, Hunter returned to Australia, signing a one-season deal with Sydney FC.

== International career ==
In 2022, Hunter made her debut and scored her first goal for the Young Matildas in a 5–1 win over New Zealand. Hunter was a part of Australia's side at the 2022 FIFA U-20 World Cup playing in all three games against Costa Rica, Brazil, and Spain. She scored a penalty goal in the Costa Rica game and was made captain in the third game against Spain.

Hunter was a part of Australia U23's team at the 2022 AFF Women's Championship, featuring in four games and scoring one goal against Singapore.

In November 2023, she earned her first call-up to the senior national team when captain Sam Kerr missed the game due to injury.

== Honours ==
- April 2023 - Professional Football Association (PFA) names Hunter in 2022-23 Women's Team of the season
- 1 June 2023 - 19 year old Hunter named as the Australian Liberty A-League Young Footballer of the Year.
- 6 June 2023 - Hunter awarded Sydney Football Club Under 20's player of the Year
