= Sydney FC (women) =

Australian women's soccer club

- Full name: Sydney Football Club
- Nickname: The Sky Blues
- Founded: 2008; 18 years ago
- Ground: Sydney Olympic Park Athletic Centre; WIN Stadium; Sydney Football Stadium
- Chairman: Scott Barlow
- Head coach: James Slaveski
- League: A-League Women
- 2025–26: 10th of 11
- Website: http://www.sydneyfc.com.au/
Home colours	Away colours

Sydney Football Club, commonly known as Sydney FC, is an Australian professional women's soccer club based in Sydney, New South Wales, Australia. They compete in the A-League Women, the top tier of women's soccer in Australia, and are the most successful women's soccer club in Australia. They play their home matches at Sydney Olympic Park Athletic Centre and WIN Stadium, with select matches being played at Sydney Football Stadium.

== History ==
=== Establishment ===
The formation of the W-League in October 2008 saw the league composed of eight teams. Seven of the eight clubs were directly affiliated with the A-League clubs, Sydney FC being one. The women's team shares the men's club name and colours.

=== Inaugural season ===
The inaugural W-League season was played over 10 rounds, followed by a finals series. During Sydney's season opener, the squad defeated Perth Glory 4–0 with a brace scored by Leena Khamis and two goals from Danielle Small and Heather Garriock.

Captained by Australian international Heather Garriock Sydney's first season saw mixed results. The club made it to the top four to qualify for the finals, however lost out to eventual champions Brisbane in the semi-finals.

== Kits ==
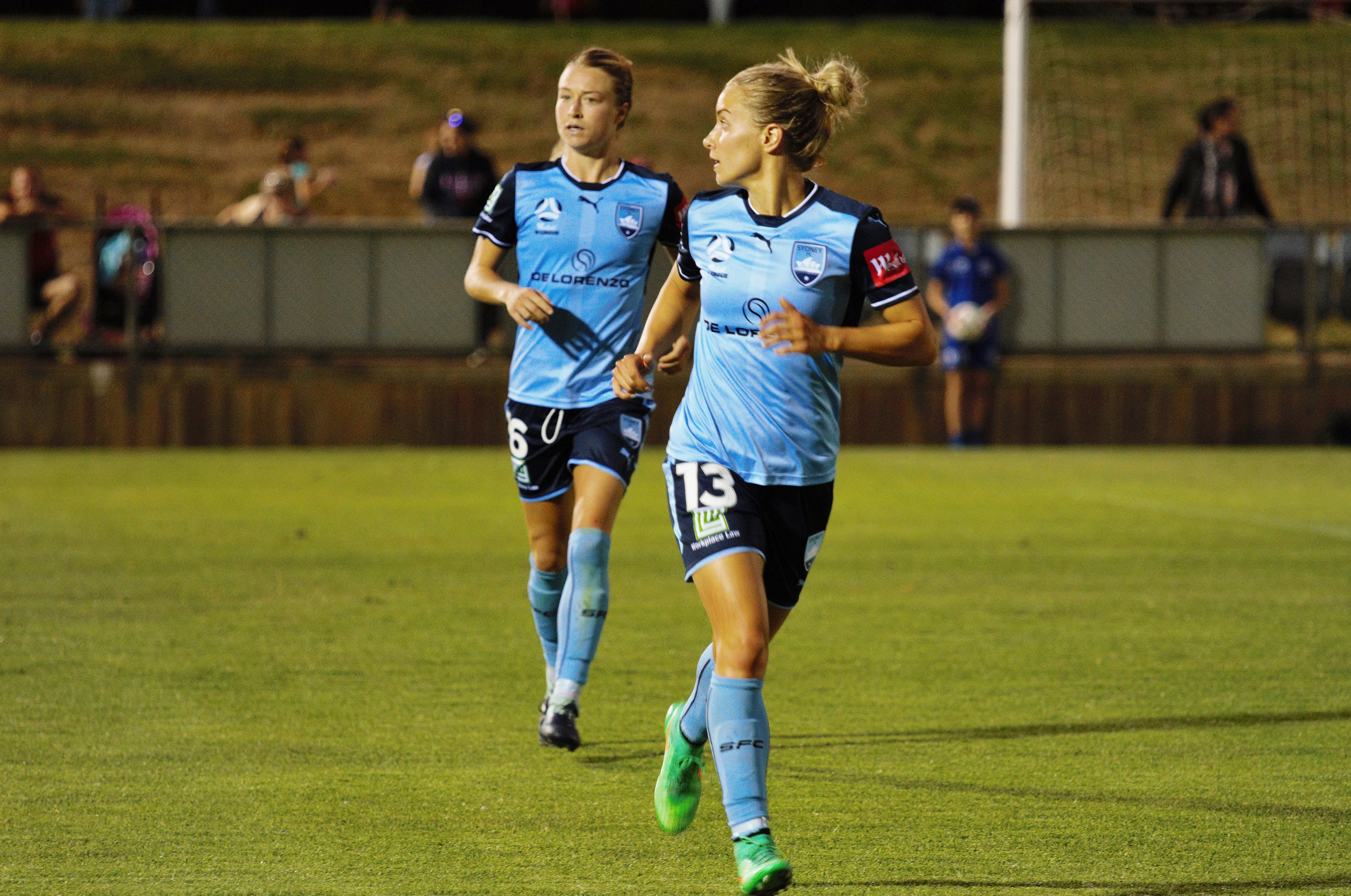
Sydney FC players wearing the club's home kit in 2017

The primary club colour of Sydney FC is sky blue, which represents the state colour of New South Wales. The secondary club colour is navy blue, with additional contrasting colours of white.

The former Sydney FC badge was created and used since the men's club founding in 2004. It features a football set centrally in a stylised crest shape. Above the ball is the shape of three shells of the Sydney Opera House, an internationally recognisable symbol of the city of Sydney. Below the ball is the Commonwealth Star, a seven-pointed star symbolising the Federation of Australia.

The current Sydney FC badge was released in 2017. The crest features the Sydney Opera House in white pictured in front of a sky-blue backdrop on top of a navy blue base featuring the Commonwealth Star.

=== Kit suppliers and shirt sponsors ===
Period	Kit Manufacturer	Shirt Sponsor	Minor Sponsor
2008–2009	Reebok	Bing Lee; JVC	HBA Insurance
2009–2011	Reebok	Bing Lee, Sony	MBF Health Insurance; Pulsar
2011–2012	Adidas	Unicef	Sydney Children's Hospital; CMRI
2012–2014	Adidas	Webjet	Destination NSW; Caltex
2014–2015	Adidas	Webjet	StarTrack; Beechwood
2015–2017	Puma	Webjet	StarTrack; ITP; University of New South Wales
2017–2019	Puma	The Star	StarTrack; ITP; University of New South Wales
2019–2023	Under Armour	The Star	Kennards Hire
2023–	Under Armour	Macquarie University	Kennards Hire

== Stadiums ==
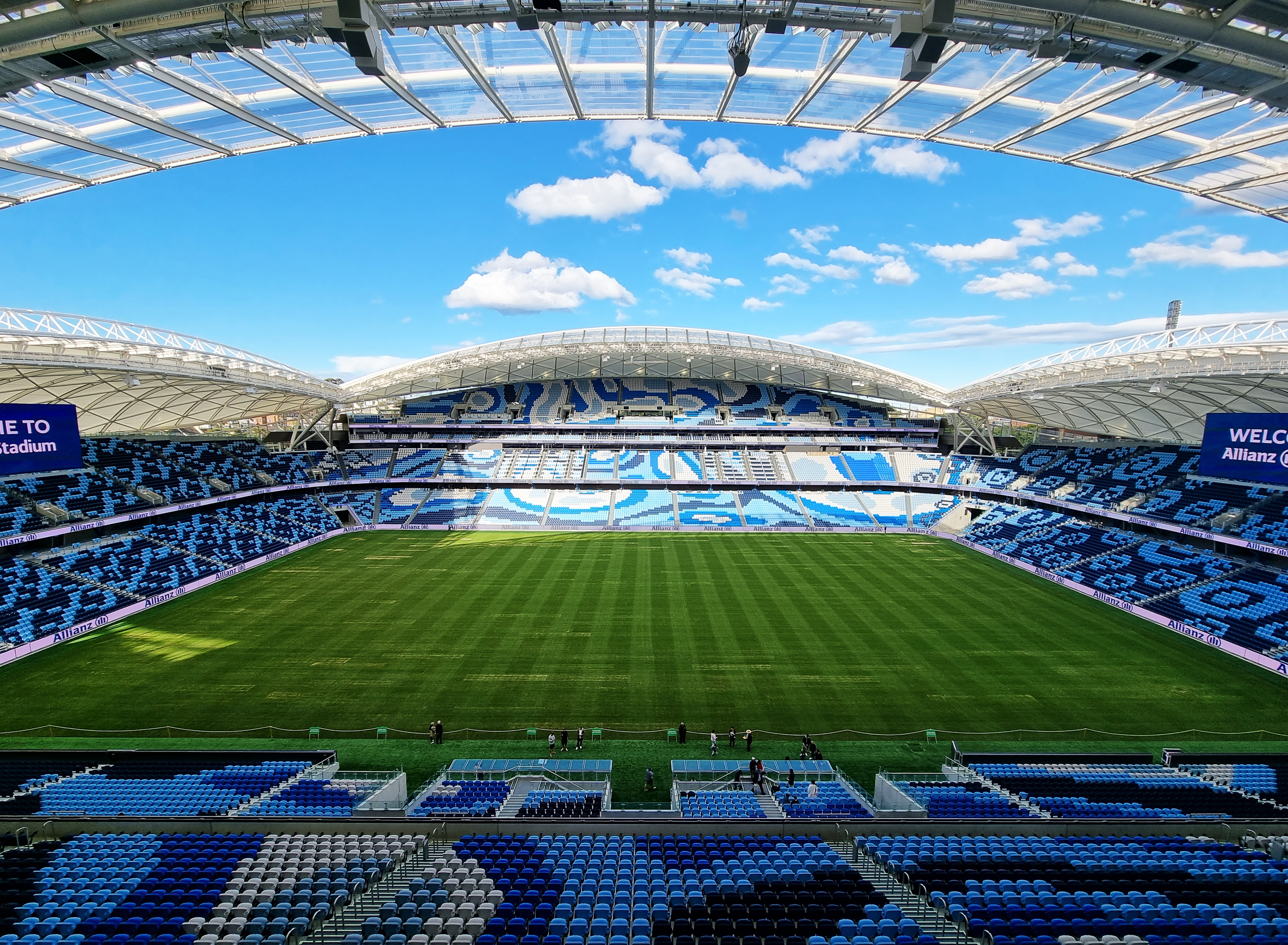
Sydney Football Stadium has been one of the home grounds of Sydney FC since the 2022–23 season

Sydney FC currently plays its home games at WIN Stadium, Located in Wollongong, New South Wales, WIN Stadium features a seating capacity of 23,750 and a grass field at Sydney Olympic Park Athletic Centre in Sydney Olympic Park suburb of Sydney, New South Wales. The capacity of the stadium is 5,000 spectators. They also played in recent home games in Jubilee Oval, ANZ Stadium, and Allianz Stadium (formerly Sydney Football Stadium). Jubilee Oval is located in Carlton, New South Wales, a suburb of Sydney. It features a 24,000 seating capacity and grass pitch. The primary tenants for both fields are the St. George Illawarra Dragons rugby league team. ANZ Stadium has a capacity of 82,500, and is only a secondary home for bigger matches, such as the Sydney Derby against Western Sydney Wanderers. Allianz Stadium is located in Moore Park, Sydney and features a seating capacity of 41,159 and grass pitch. The Matildas, Socceroos and the Wallabies occasionally play at the stadium, while the Sydney Roosters, NSW Waratahs and Sydney FC men's team are the grounds major tenants.

During the inaugural season of the W-League, Sydney FC played their home matches at Campbelltown Stadium, a rugby league stadium in Leumeah, New South Wales, Australia. The stadium is owned by Campbelltown City Council and features a nominal capacity of 20,000. It is the full-time home ground for the Western Suburbs Magpies District Rugby league Football Club and is one of three home grounds for the Wests Tigers Rugby league Football Club. The men's Sydney FC team played some pre-season and A-League matches at the stadium in 2008 as well.

During the 2009 season, the club played their home games at Sydney Football Stadium. The following season, they played home games at Campbelltown Stadium, WIN Stadium, and Seymour Shaw Park. During the 2011–12 season, they played at Leichhardt Oval and Campbelltown Stadium. During the 2012–13 season, they played at Leichhardt Oval, Sydney Football Stadium, and Cromer Park. During the 2013–2014 season, they played at Jubilee Oval, WIN Stadium, Sydney Football Stadium and at the Sydney United Sports Centre.

During the 2014–15 season, they played their home games at Lambert Park, Jubilee Oval and WIN Stadium.

== Players ==
=== Current squad ===
As of 29 October 2026

Note: Flags indicate national team as defined under FIFA eligibility rules; some limited exceptions apply. Players may hold more than one non-FIFA nationality.

No.	Pos.	Nation	Player
1	GK	AUS	Jada Whyman
2	FW	USA	Faith Webber
3	DF	AUS	Charlotte McLean
6	FW	AUS	Shay Hollman
7	FW	AUS	Milly Cassar
8	MF	CRO	Bianca Gittany
10	FW	AUS	Indiana dos Santos
11	DF	USA	Kiley Dulaney
12	DF	AUS	Natalie Tobin (captain)
13	FW	PAN	Riley Cohn
14	MF	AUS	Olivia Price
16	DF	AUS	Willa Pearson
17	MF	AUS	Claire Corbett

No.	Pos.	Nation	Player
18	FW	AUS	Amber Luchtmeijer
19	MF	AUS	Amy Chessari
20	FW	AUS	Sophie Aungle
21	MF	AUS	Sarah Hunter
22	FW	AUS	Jada Taylor
23	DF	AUS	Rubi Sullivan
26	MF	AUS	Maddie Caspers
27	DF	AUS	Poppy Channing
28	MF	USA	Kenzie Roling
29	GK	AUS	Alyse Oppedisano
30	GK	AUS	Tiahna Robertson
33	MF	AUS	Abbie Puckett
37	GK	AUS	Annabelle Croll

== Management ==
=== Current staff ===
Position	Name
Head coach	(Australia) James Slaveski
Assistant coach	(Australia) Thomas Whiteside
Assistant coach	(Australia) Alice Kriesler

=== Managerial history ===
Name	Nationality	From	To
Alen Stajcic	Australia	9 September 2008	27 September 2014
Dan Barrett	Australia	27 September 2014	7 June 2017
Ante Juric	Australia	7 June 2017	3 February 2026
James Slaveski	Australia	3 February 2026	—

== Season by season record ==
Season	W-League											Awards (Note: Player of the Year: From seasons ending in 2012 to 2018, there was only a Player of the Year award.; From seasons ending in 2019 on-wards, a member's player of the year award and an Under-20's award was introduced.)			Top goalscorer(s)	
Season	Div	P	W	D	L	F	A	GD	Pts	Pos	Finals	POTY	Member's	U-20's	Player(s)	G
2008–09	W-League	10	4	2	4	15	12	+3	14	4th	SF	—N/a	—N/a	—N/a	Leena Khamis	7
2009	W-League	10	7	2	1	25	10	+15	23	Premiers	Champions	—N/a	—N/a	—N/a	Leena Khamis (2) Sarah Walsh	8
2010–11	W-League	10	8	0	2	29	9	+20	24	Premiers	Runners-up	—N/a	—N/a	—N/a	Kyah Simon	12
2011–12	W-League	10	5	2	3	26	8	+18	17	3rd	SF	Teresa Polias	—N/a	—N/a	Renee Rollason	6
2012–13	W-League	12	6	2	4	30	24	+6	20	4th	Champions	Teresa Polias (2)	—N/a	—N/a	Sam Kerr	9
2013–14	W-League	12	8	2	2	37	14	+23	26	2nd	SF	Nicola Bolger	—N/a	—N/a	Jodie Taylor	11
2014	W-League	12	5	3	4	17	16	+1	18	4th	SF	Jasmyne Spencer	—N/a	—N/a	Jasmyne Spencer	8
2015–16	W-League	12	6	1	5	15	21	–6	19	3rd	Runners-up	Alanna Kennedy	—N/a	—N/a	Kyah Simon (2)	6
2016–17	W-League	12	7	1	4	22	16	+6	22	3rd	SF	Remy Siemsen	—N/a	—N/a	Remy Siemsen	6
2017–18	W-League	12	8	1	3	26	16	+10	25	2nd	Runners-up	Chloe Logarzo	—N/a	—N/a	Lisa De Vanna Kylie Ledbrook	6
2018–19	W-League	12	6	1	5	28	19	+9	19	3rd	Champions	Teresa Polias (3)	Liz Ralston	Princess Ibini	Caitlin Foord	10
2019–20	W-League	12	7	1	4	21	13	+8	22	3rd	Runners-up	Sofia Huerta	Teresa Polias	A. Hristodoulou	Remy Siemsen (2)	7
2020–21	W-League	12	9	1	2	26	11	+15	28	Premiers	Runners-up	Clare Wheeler	Cortnee Vine	Taylor Ray	Remy Siemsen (3)	7
2021–22	A-League Women	14	11	2	1	36	6	+30	35	Premiers	Runners-up	M. Hawkesby	Cortnee Vine (2)	Taylor Ray (2)	Cortnee Vine	9
2022–23	A-League Women	18	13	1	4	43	15	+28	40	Premiers	Champions	Natalie Tobin		Sarah Hunter	Madison Haley	11
2023–24	A-League Women	22	11	6	5	31	20	+11	39	2nd	Champions	Charlotte McLean	Mackenzie Hawkesby	Shae Hollman	Cortnee Vine (2)	10
2024–25	A-League Women	23	7	4	12	23	29	−6	25	9th	DNQ	Natalie Tobin (2)	Indiana dos Santos	Indiana dos Santos	Mackenzie Hawkesby	6
2025–26	A-League Women	20	4	7	9	18	29	−11	19	10th	DNQ				Riley Tanner	5

== Honours ==
Chart of yearly table positions for Sydney FC in A-League Women

- W-League/A-League Women regular season

Premiers (5): 2009, 2010–11, 2020–21, 2021–22, 2022–23
Runners-up (3): 2013–14, 2017–18, 2023–24

- W-League/A-League Women finals

Champions (5): 2009, 2012–13, 2018–19, 2022–23, 2023–24
Runners-up (6): 2010–11, 2015–16, 2017–18, 2019–20, 2020–21, 2021–22

== International record ==
Season	Competition	Round	Club	Home	Away	Position
2023	AFC Women's Club Championship	Group B	(Iran) Bam Khatoon	3–0		2nd
2023	AFC Women's Club Championship	Group B	(Uzbekistan) FC Nasaf	2–1		2nd
2023	AFC Women's Club Championship	Group B	(South Korea) Incheon Hyundai Steel Red Angels	0–3		2nd

== See also ==
- List of top-division football clubs in AFC countries
- Women's soccer in Australia
- A-League Women records and statistics
- Australia women's national soccer team
