= Ally Green =

Australian football (soccer) player

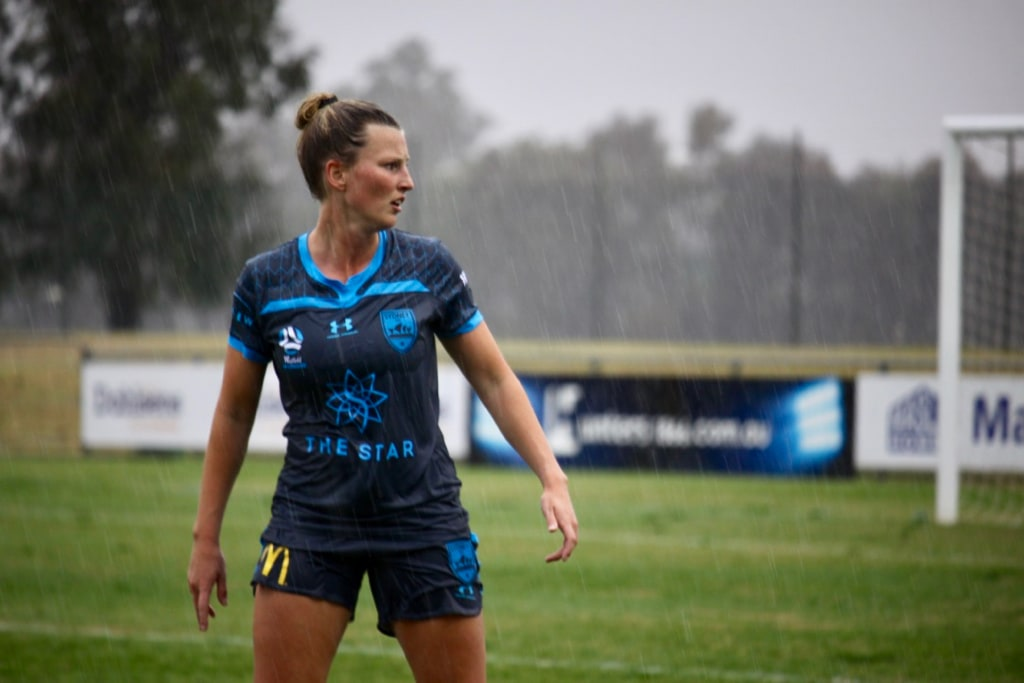
- Green playing for Sydney FC in 2019

Personal information
- Full name: Ally Cailin Green
- Date of birth: 17 August 1998 (age 28)
- Place of birth: Sydney, Australia
- Height: 1.65 m (5 ft 5 in)
- Position: Defender

Team information
- Current team: Copenhagen

Senior career*
Years	Team	Apps	(Gls)
- Manly United
2017–2022	Sydney FC	48	(2)
2022–2023	Vålerenga	6	(0)
2023–2024	AGF	21	(2)
2025	Calgary Wild FC	22	(1)
2026–	Copenhagen	5	(0)

International career^{‡}
	Australia U20	6	(3)
2022–	New Zealand	20	(2)
- * Club domestic league appearances and goals as of 23 May 2026. ‡ National team caps and goals as of 23 May 2026.

Ally Cailin Green (born 17 August 1998) is a footballer who plays as a defender for Copenhagen. Born in Australia, she plays for the New Zealand national team.

== Club career ==
Green signed for Sydney FC in Australia's top soccer league, W-League for the 2017–18 season but endured a severe ankle injury and did not play during the season. During the 2018–19 season, Green played in eight games for Sydney FC. The club finished in third place during the regular season and earned a berth to the finals series. Green was the starting left-back defender for the semi-final match against Brisbane Roar and helped Sydney win 2–1 and advance to the 2019 W-League Grand Final. She played every minute of the Final helping lift the team to a 4–2 championship win against Perth Glory.

During the 2019–20 W-League season, Green made ten appearances with eight starts. Sydney FC finished in third place earning a berth to the Finals. ESPN described Green's performance in the semi-final against Melbourne Victory: "Green showed the kind of grit that allowed Sydney to withstand a second-half Victory onslaught. She then headed into her third consecutive Grand Final with the club that gave her the first taste of professional football, and at just 23 years old, it's easy to see the potential for bigger and better things to come." During the 2020 W-League Grand Final, Green made a "brilliant cross-field ball" to Veronica Latsko. Sydney FC were narrowly defeated 1–0 by four-time champions Melbourne City FC.

Sydney FC were crowned Premiers finishing top of the table. Green then produced a 30-yard strike in the Semi-final against Canberra United, which saw her team progress to the Grand Final for a fourth consecutive year & additionally would earn a goal of the season award from her club. An extra-time match saw Sydney FC go down 1–0 in the last minute of the match. She returns to Sydney FC for her fifth season with 'Sky Blue' for the 2021–22 season.

In January 2023, Green joined Danish club AGF.

In January 2025, she signed with Northern Super League club Calgary Wild FC. On 16 April 2025, she started in the league's inaugural game, a 1–0 loss to Vancouver Rise FC. On 3 December 2025, it was announced that she had been released from the Wild following the conclusion of the inaugural 2025 season.

On 17 January 2026, Green joined F.C. Copenhagen.

== International career ==
Green represented Australia for the under-20 national team at the 2016 AFF Women's Championship where she scored a hat-trick against Timor-Leste. Green also featured in the Senior Matilda's first Identification Camp in 2019 on the back on successful W-League & NPL campaigns.

On 25 March 2022 Green announced that she was committed to playing for New Zealand after constantly being overlooked for the Australian team. She is due to be called up for New Zealand in their upcoming friendlies against Australia in April, provided FIFA approve a one-time switch of nationality.

On 4 July 2024, Green was called up to the New Zealand squad for the 2024 Summer Olympics.

== International goals ==
No.	Date	Venue	Opponent	Score	Result	Competition
1.	7 February 2024	FFS Football Stadium, Apia, Samoa	Tonga	2–0	3–0	2024 OFC Women's Olympic Qualifying Tournament
2.	10 February 2024	FFS Football Stadium, Apia, Samoa	Samoa	5–0	6–0	2024 OFC Women's Olympic Qualifying Tournament

== Personal life ==
Green's mother is a New Zealander which allowed her to be called up to play for New Zealand despite being born and living in Australia.

== Honours ==
Sydney FC

- W-League Championship: 2018–19
- W-League Premiership: 2020–21
- W-League Role Model Award: 2019–20
- PFA Young Player of the Year Nomination: 2019
- PFA Community Medal Nomination: 2020
- NPL Championship with Manly United: 2017 & 2020
