= Jada Mathyssen-Whyman =

Australian football (soccer) player

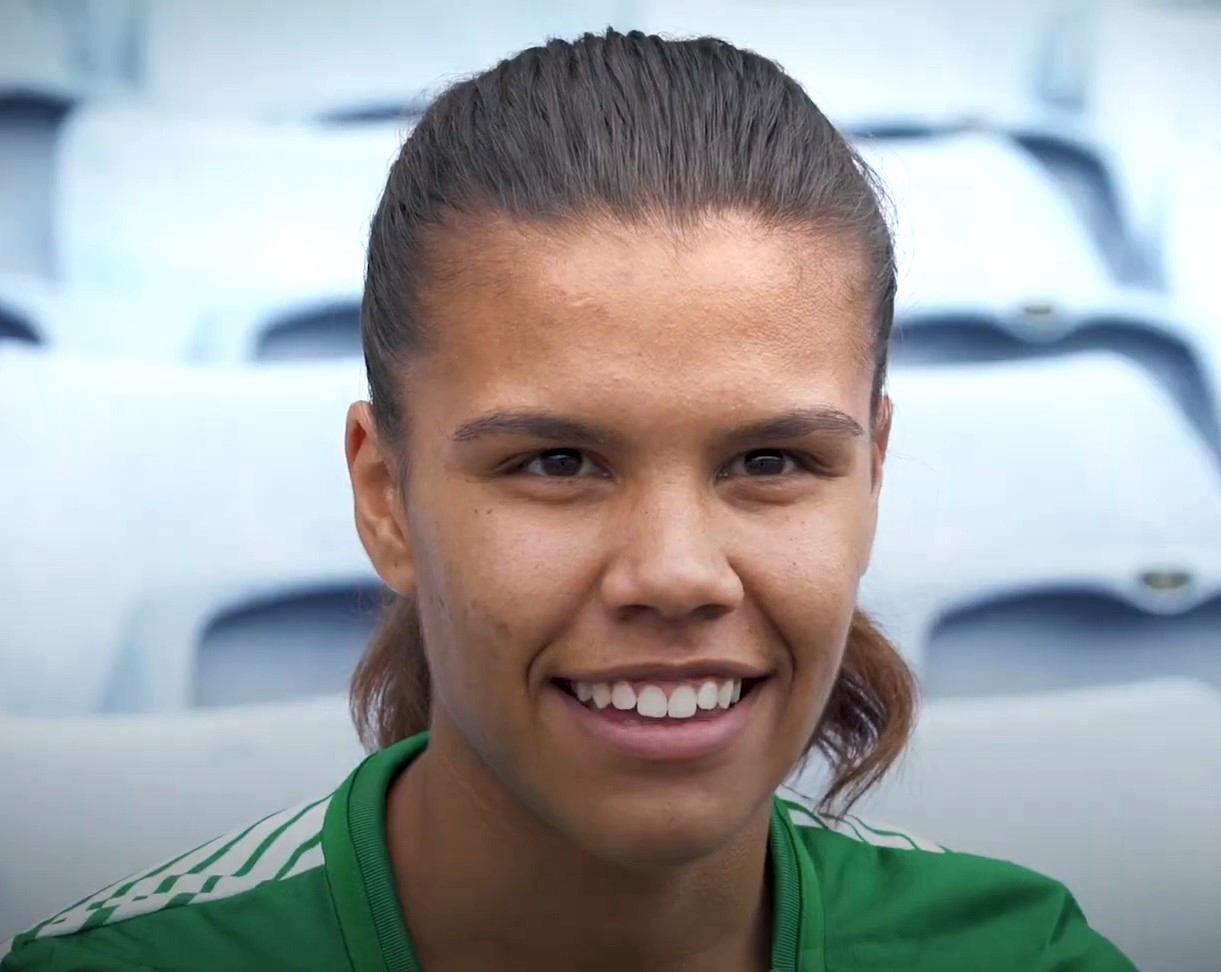
- Mathyssen-Whyman for Western Sydney Wanderers FC in 2018

Personal information
- Full name: Jada Leanne Mathyssen-Whyman
- Date of birth: 24 October 1999 (age 27)
- Place of birth: Wagga Wagga, New South Wales, Australia
- Height: 1.67 m (5 ft 6 in)
- Position: Goalkeeper

Team information
- Current team: Sydney FC
- Number: 1

Youth career
- Tolland Football Club

Senior career*
Years	Team	Apps	(Gls)
2013–2015	Macarthur Rams	22	(0)
2015–2020	Western Sydney Wanderers	35	(0)
2016	NSW Institute of Sport	15	(0)
2017	Macarthur Rams	2	(0)
2020–2024	Sydney FC	70	(0)
2024–2026	AIK	13	(0)
2026–	Sydney FC	0	(0)

International career^{‡}
2014	Australia U-17	2	(0)
2015–2017	Australia U-20	10	(0)
2022	Australia U-23	2	(0)
- * Club domestic league appearances and goals as of 17 May 2025 ‡ National team caps and goals as of 17 December 2024

Jada Leanne Mathyssen-Whyman (/ˈdʒɑːdə ˈmæθɪsən ˈwaɪmən/ JAH-də MATH-ih-sən WHY-mən; born 24 October 1999), also known as Jada Whyman, is an Australian soccer player who plays as a goalkeeper for Sydney FC.

== Early life and education ==
Jada Leanne Mathyssen-Whyman was born on 24 October 1999 in Wagga Wagga, New South Wales. She is of Aboriginal Australian heritage, with ancestry from the Wiradjuri and Yorta Yorta peoples.

She grew up in Wagga Wagga before moving to Canberra and later Sydney, where she attended Westfields Sports High School. She travelled from Wagga Wagga to both Sydney and Canberra regularly until late 2013, when she moved to the Australian Capital Territory.

AFL player David Wirrpanda is Mathyssen-Whyman's uncle and godfather, and her family were AFL fans. Mathyssen-Whyman played Australian rules football until the age of around ten, when her father suggested soccer as a possible career option. She was inspired by Lydia Williams' goalkeeping skills in the 2011 FIFA Women's World Cup, and Williams' coach and mentor Paul Jones invited her to join his elite Canberra goalkeeping academy, as a young teenager.

== Club career ==
Mathyssen-Whyman's first club in Sydney was Macarthur Rams, joining the club in 2013 while still living in Wagga Wagga.

In August 2015, Mathyssen-Whyman signed to play for Western Sydney Wanderers in the 2015–16 W-League, and made seven appearances in her debut season. She suffered a torn thigh in a game against Newcastle Jets, causing her to miss much of the season.

Whyman joined Sydney FC ahead of the 2020–21 W-League season. In August 2024, Mathyssen-Whyman left Sydney FC at the end of her contract and joined Swedish club AIK until the end of the 2025 season.

In May 2026, following a knee injury, Whyman left AIK, pausing her football career.

In August 2026, Whyman returned to Australia, signing a two-year contract with Sydney FC.

== International career ==
Mathyssen-Whyman was first called up to the Australian under–17 team in 2013 for the 2013 AFC U-16 Women's Championship, aged thirteen.

She made her debut for Australia under–20 in a 2–0 win over Uzbekistan in the group stage of the 2015 AFC U-19 Women's Championship.

She was subsequently selected in a squad for the Senior national team (the Matildas), who played two friendlies against France and England in October 2018.

== Honours ==
- National Premier Leagues NSW Goalkeeper of the Year: 2015, 2016, 2018
- Westfield W-League – Western Sydney Wanderers FC: Player of the Year 2017/18
- Westfield W-League – Western Sydney Wanderers FC: Members' Player of the Year 2017/18, 2018/19

== Other activities ==
Mathyssen-Whyman, realising her status as a role model to young Indigenous Australians, has worked with John Moriarty Football, an organisation that partners with Football Australia to assist young Indigenous footballers.

As of 2021 she also does voluntary work for Glebe Youth Service, which supports Indigenous youth in remote communities.
