= Ante Juric =

Australian soccer player and manager

Personal information
- Date of birth: 11 November 1973 (age 52)
- Place of birth: Canberra, Australian Capital Territory, Australia
- Height: 1.93 m (6 ft 4 in)
- Position: Defender

Youth career
- Canberra Deakin
- 1991: AIS

Senior career*
Years	Team	Apps	(Gls)
1992	Canberra Deakin	13	(0)
1993	Canberra Deakin	13	(0)
1993–1994	Melbourne Knights	1	(0)
1994	Fawkner Blues	12	(2)
1994–1995	Sydney Olympic	21	(0)
1995–1996	Benfica Castelo Branco	11	(0)
1996–1997	Canberra Cosmos	10	(0)
1997	A.P.I.A. Leichhardt	19	(3)
1997–2004	Sydney Olympic	189	(17)
2001	Molde	3	(0)
2003	Johor FC	17	(0)
2004-05	Pahang FA	18	(0)
2005–2007	Sydney United	51	(1)

International career
1992–93	Australia U20	23	(0)
1994-96	Australia U23	6	(0)
2002	Australia	4	(1)

Managerial career
- 2008–2009: Sydney FC Women (assistant)
- 2009–2010: Australia U-13/14s
- 2017–2026: Sydney FC Women
- 2020–2022: Sydney Olympic
- 2025: Sydney United 58
Medal record
Representing Australia
Men's Association football
OFC Nations Cup
Runner-up	2002 New Zealand
- * Club domestic league appearances and goals

Ante Juric (Croatian: [ǎːnte jǔːrit͡ɕ]; born 11 November 1973) is an Australian soccer manager and former professional player. He was recently the Matildas assistant coach (201-15), the Australian under-17s and 19s women's national coach (2014–16) and was the Assistant national technical director (2013–2016) for Football Australia. He most recently served as the head coach for Sydney FC in the A-League Women competition.

== Playing career ==
Juric, born in Canberra in 1973, has played professionally for 13 years and has represented Australia as a Socceroo, Olyroo, and Young Socceroo where the team finished fourth in the World Youth Cup of 1993. However Juric did not play a huge part for the national team and only represented his country late in his career. This was after his performance in the 2002 National Soccer League Grand Final win over Perth Glory, playing with a dislocated elbow, and he finally received his senior cap that same year.

Juric learnt his trade at one of Australia's major junior nurseries in Canberra Croatia FC. The club has produced the likes of Ned Zelic, Josip Simunic and George Kulscar. From here he went on to represent Australia at the World Youth Cup in 1993, culminating in a 4th-place finish, losing to eventual champions Brazil.

Juric went on to have a successful National Soccer League career playing for the Melbourne Knights, Sydney Olympic, and Canberra Cosmos, playing over 200 games and scoring over 20 goals and winning premierships and championships.

In the later stages of his career, Juric played in the NSW Premier League, where he won a title with Sydney United 58.

In 2009 Juric was inducted into the ACT Sports Hall of Fame for his Football exploits and additionally in the same year he was inducted into the Capital Football Hall of Fame.

== Managerial career ==
Sydney United 58 in the NSWNPL and Sydney FC Women in the A-Leagues.

Juric was a former Women's U19 and Women's U17 national Australian coach and also the NSWIS Football men's coach.

In June 2017, Juric was appointed head coach of Sydney FC's women's team. He was their longest serving coach with 157 games, departing in February 2026. Under him, the team were 3-time A-League Champions and 3-time A-League Premiers.

In 2020, Juric was appointed head coach of Sydney Olympic FC where he remained for 2 years.

On November 18 2024, Juric was appointed Sydney United 58 FC head coach for the upcoming 2025 NPL NSW season and inaugural Australian Championship season. At the end of the Australian Championship season in November, Juric resigned from his post.

== Career statistics ==
=== International ===
Australia national team
Year	Apps	Goals
2002	4	1
Total	4	1

== Honours ==
Australia

- OFC Nations Cup: runner-up 2002
