= Taylor Ray =

Australian soccer player

Personal information
- Full name: Taylor Ray
- Date of birth: 22 April 2001 (age 25)
- Place of birth: Townsville, Queensland, Australia
- Height: 1.60 m (5 ft 3 in)
- Position: Midfielder

Team information
- Current team: Melbourne City
- Number: 22

Senior career*
Years	Team	Apps	(Gls)
2017–2024	Sydney FC	61	(2)
2022–2023	Sydney Olympic	20	(1)
2024–2025	Central Coast Mariners	26	(0)
2025–2026	Melbourne Victory	19	(0)
2026–	Melbourne City	0	(0)

International career^{‡}
2017	Australia U-17	3	(0)
2017–2019	Australia U-20	3	(2)
2022–	Australia	1	(0)
- * Club domestic league appearances and goals as of 20 August 2026 ‡ National team caps and goals as of 22 June 2022

Taylor Ray (born 22 April 2001) is an Australian professional soccer player who plays as a midfielder for A-League Women club Melbourne City.

== Club career ==
Ray was born in 2001 in Townsville and played for local team, Townsville Warriors as a junior. She made her senior debut in the A-League Women, at age 16, for Sydney FC on 9 December 2017, in a 3–1 win against Western Sydney Wanderers.

In May 2024, Ray departed Sydney FC, after seven seasons at the club. Over her 61 appearances she kicked two goals for her team. During her time at Sydney in the A-League Women off-seasons, Ray also appeared for National Premier Leagues Women's clubs Football NSW Institute (2017–2018) and Sydney Olympic (2020–2024).

In August 2024, Ray was signed by Central Coast Mariners for the 2024–25 A-League Women season. Following the expiration of her contract, Ray left Central Coast Mariners in August 2025. A few days later,Melbourne Victory announced signing Ray for the 2025–26 A-League Women season. After one season, Ray departed Melbourne Victory to pursue other opportunities. Two days later, it was announced she signed for Melbourne City.

== International career ==
In June 2022, after an impressive season with Sydney FC, Ray was called up to Australia's senior national team for their upcoming friendlies against Spain and Portugal.
