= Elizabeth Ralston =

Australian soccer player

Personal information
- Full name: Elizabeth Rose Ralston
- Date of birth: 16 May 1995 (age 31)
- Place of birth: Camden, Australia
- Height: 1.62 m (5 ft 4 in)
- Position: Defender

Senior career*
Years	Team	Apps	(Gls)
2012–2021	Sydney FC	80	(0)
2021–2022	Western Sydney Wanderers	2	(0)
- * Club domestic league appearances and goals as of 12 September 2021

Elizabeth Rose "Liz" Ralston (born 16 May 1995) is an Australian football (soccer) player, who plays for Western Sydney Wanderers in the Australian W-League. She has previously played for Sydney FC. She also works as a physiotherapist.

Ralston started playing soccer from the age of seven and made her debut for Sydney FC at the age of 17, in the 2012–13 season. In 2019, she received a call up to the national team.

In September 2021, Ralston left Sydney FC, after 9 years at the club. A few months after leaving Sydney FC, Ralston joined cross-town rivals Western Sydney Wanderers. At the end of the season she left the club and joined APIA Leichhardt.
