= Natalie Tobin =

Australian soccer player

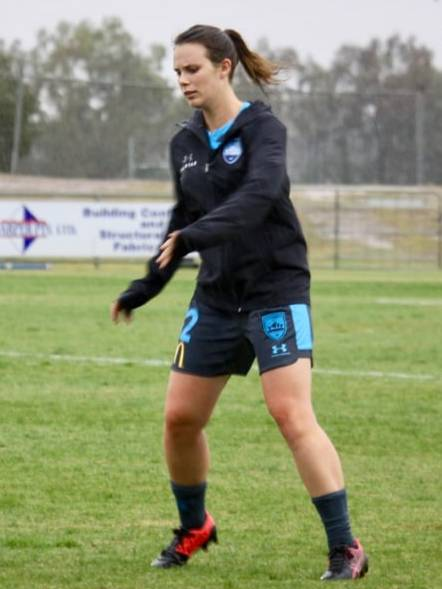

Personal information
- Full name: Natalie Louise Tobin
- Date of birth: 13 October 1996 (age 30)
- Place of birth: Wahroonga, New South Wales, Australia
- Height: 1.67 m (5 ft 5 1/2 in)
- Position: Midfielder

Team information
- Current team: Sydney FC
- Number: 12

Senior career*
| Years | Team | Apps | (Gls) |
| 2012– | Sydney FC | 100 | (7) |
- * Club domestic league appearances and goals as of 14 October 2023

Natalie Louise Tobin (/ˈtoʊbɪn/ TOH-bin; 13 October 1996) is an Australian professional soccer player who plays as a midfielder and defender for A-League Women club Sydney FC.

== Club career ==
Tobin began playing at Berowra before moving to Northern Tigers. She then turned out for North West Sydney Spirit FC, where she played over 150 matches.

=== Sydney FC ===
Tobin signed with Sydney FC as a 15 year old in 2012, debuting in the Grand Final and winning her first A League Women's Championship alongside the likes of Sam Kerr, Alanna Kennedy and Teresa Polias.

In May 2021, it was announced that Tobin would join Perth Glory for the 2021–22 W-League season. However, three months later her plans to move to Perth were put on hold, and she re-signed with Sydney FC, being appointed as captain, following Teresa Polias taking a break.

Tobin led Sydney FC to a premiership in her first season as captain and retained the title the following season. In 2023, Tobin steered Sydney FC to a championship, scoring the second goal in a 4–0 victory over Western United at Western Sydney Stadium. An anterior cruciate ligament tear in the first round of the 2023–24 season saw Tobin miss out on the remainder of the season.

== International career ==
Tobin represented Australia at under-17 and under-20 level.

== Personal life ==
Tobin studied Occupational Therapy at Australian Catholic University alongside her football career. Tobin is married to Will Fiedler.
