= Princess Ibini-Isei =

Australian soccer player (born 2000)

Princess Ibini
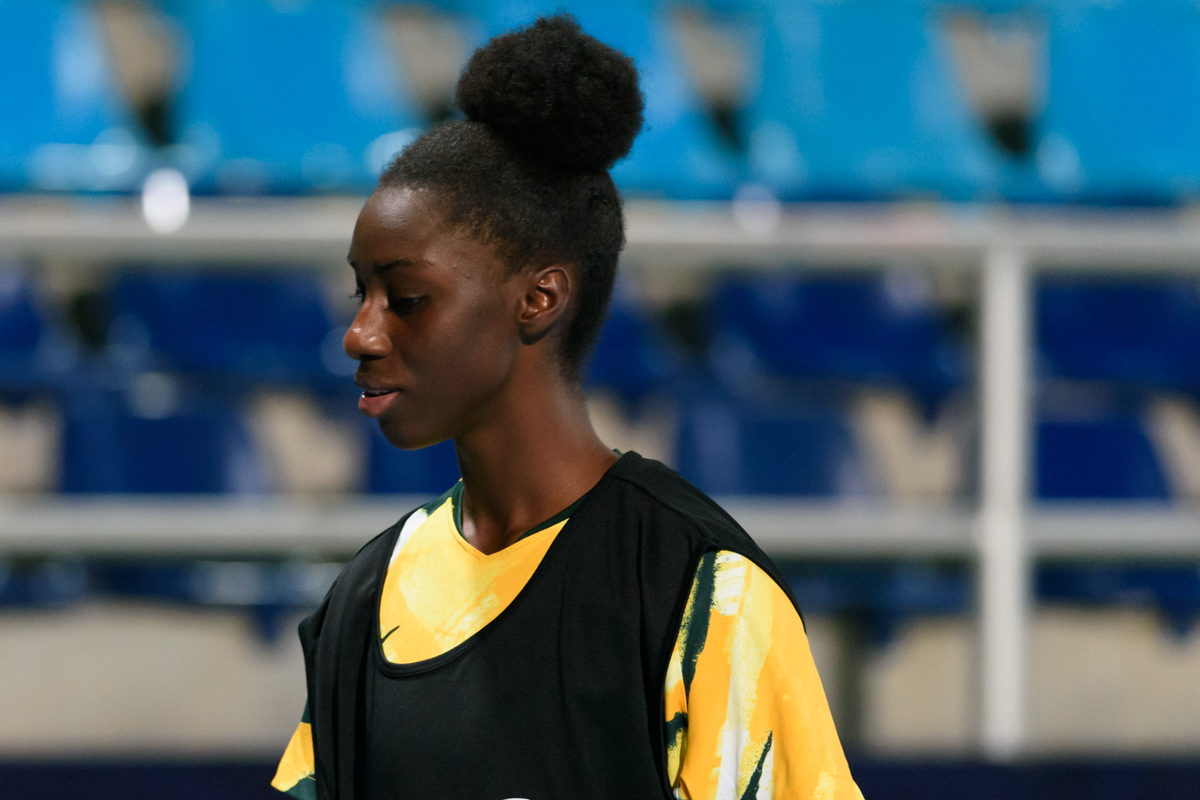
- Ibini with Australia in 2019

Personal information
- Full name: Princess Megan Ategbayon Ibini-Isei
- Date of birth: 31 January 2000 (age 26)
- Place of birth: Sydney, New South Wales, Australia
- Position: Forward

Team information
- Current team: Melbourne City

Youth career
- Illawarra United Stingrays
- FNSW Institute

Senior career*
Years	Team	Apps	(Gls)
2015–2025	Sydney FC	160	(32)
2022	APIA Leichhardt	16	(2)
2025–2026	Beşiktaş	4	(1)
2026–	Melbourne City	0	(0)

International career^{‡}
2014	Australia U17	3	(0)
2014–2019	Australia U20	30	(16)
2022–	Australia U23	3	(0)
2017–	Australia	8	(1)
- * Club domestic league appearances and goals as of 18 October 2026 ‡ National team caps and goals as of 30 June 2022

Princess Megan Ategbayon Ibini-Isei (born 31 January 2000), known as Princess Ibini, is an Australian professional soccer player who plays as a forward for A-League Women club Melbourne City and the Australia national team. She has previously played for A-League Women club Sydney FC for a record 160 appearances across ten years (2015–2025) and Kadınlar Süper Ligi club Beşiktaş.

== Early life ==
Ibini was born on 31 January 2000 in Sydney, to Nigerian migrant parents Inatimi "Ibi" (c.1965–2013) and Juliana Ibi-Isei. She grew up in the suburb of Condell Park and, as a junior, played for Earlwood Wanderers. Ibini represented NSW at youth level and has also played futsal for the Inner West Magic. She attended Westfields Sports High School along with fellow Matildas teammate Ellie Carpenter.

Ibini is the younger sister of former Socceroos player Bernie Ibini-Isei and has two more brothers, Joshua and Pharrell. She stated that Bernie is the reason she started playing soccer. Her father died in 2013 after a cardiac arrest.

== Club career ==
=== Sydney FC ===
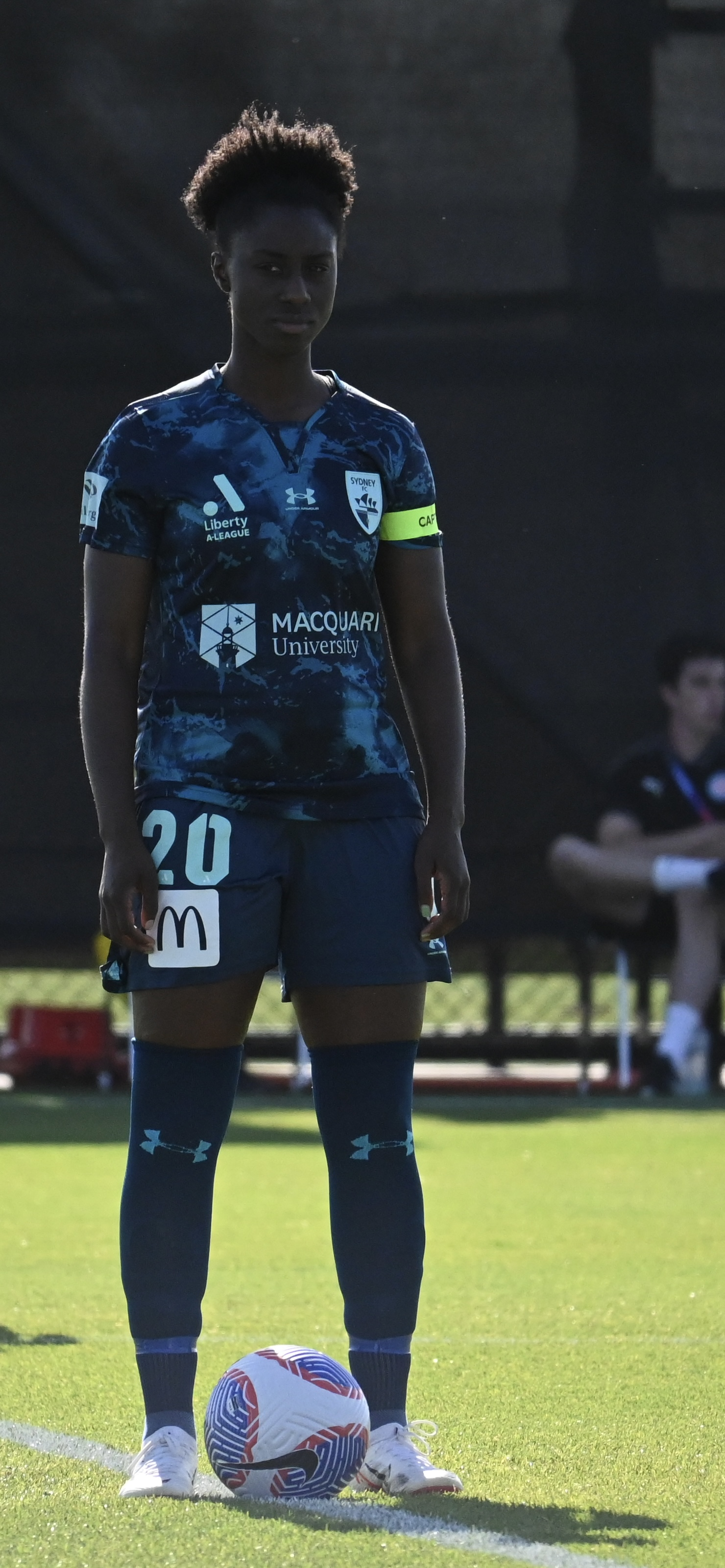
Ibini playing for Sydney FC in 2024

Ibini was a part of the Football NSW Institute program from 2015 to 2017 and also represented Illawarra United Stingrays in the National Premier Leagues NSW Women's. Having trained with the Sydney FC since she was 12-years-old, Ibini made her W-League (later renamed A-League Women) debut with the senior team at 15 during the 2015–16 season in a 0–3 loss against Canberra United FC in October 2015. Her debut goal occurred in their 2–1 away defeat against Melbourne City on 16 January 2016 and she was nominated as the NAB Young Footballer of the Month for January.

In August 2025, Ibini announced her departure from Sydney FC, having made 160 league appearances (the most by any Sydney FC women's player), providing 32 goals and competing in eight grand finals. While at Sydney she won three premierships (2020–21, 2021–22, 2022–23) and three championships (2019, 2023, 2024).

=== Beşiktaş ===
In September 2025, Ibini joined Turkish club Beşiktaş.

=== Melbourne City ===
In October 2026, Ibini returned to Australia, joining Melbourne City.

== International career ==
Ibini has represented Australia at multiple levels, starting with the U17 side in 2014. In 2015, she was included in her first training camp for the Matildas. On 27 July 2017, she made her debut for the senior team.

=== International goals ===
No.	Date	Venue	Opponent	Score	Result	Competition
1.	28 June 2022	Estádio António Coimbra da Mota, Estoril, Portugal	Portugal	1–0	1–1	Friendly

== Honours ==
=== Club ===
- W-League Premiers: 2020–21; Championship: 2018–19
- A-League Women Premiers: 2021–22, 2022–23; Championship: 2022–23, 2023–24

=== International ===
Australia

- Tournament of Nations: 2017
