= Teresa Polias =

Australian soccer player

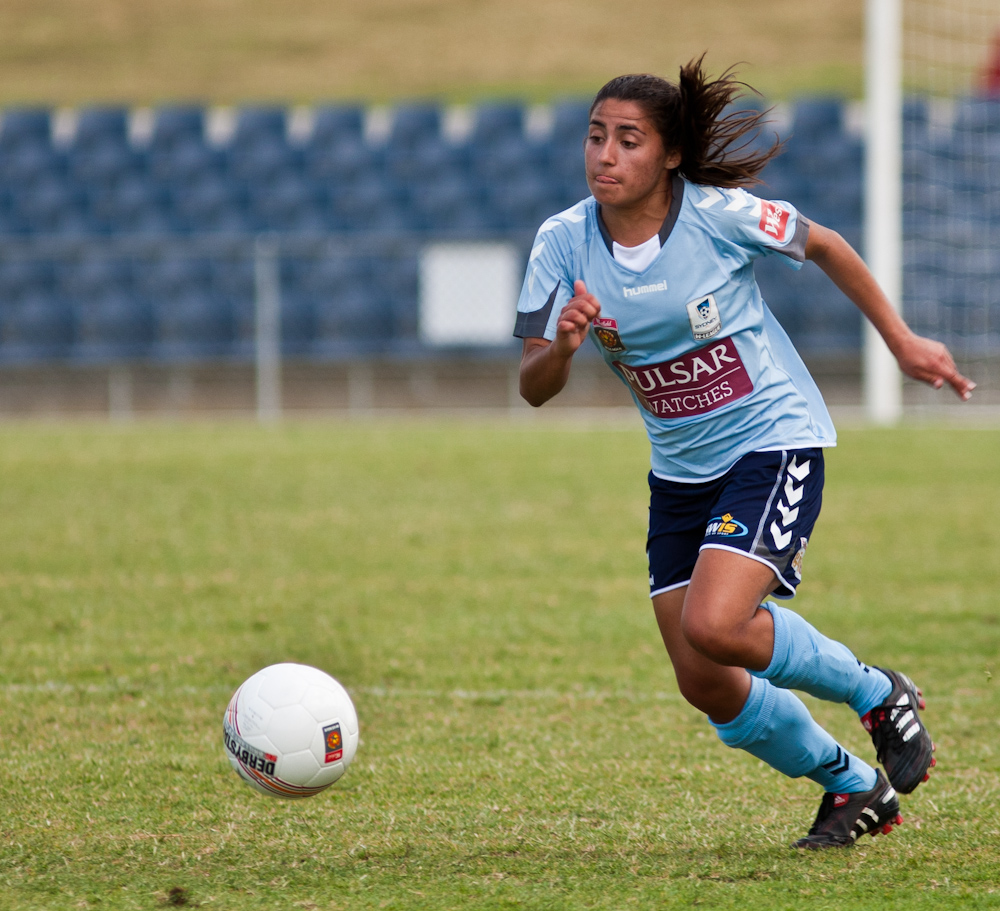
- Polias playing for Sydney FC in 2010

Personal information
- Full name: Teresa Polias
- Date of birth: 16 May 1990 (age 36)
- Place of birth: Darlinghurst, Australia
- Height: 1.55 m (5 ft 1 in)
- Position: Midfielder

Senior career*
Years	Team	Apps	(Gls)
2008–2010	Central Coast Mariners	15	(0)
2010–2021	Sydney FC	142	(8)

International career^{‡}
2008–2010	Australia U-20	4	(1)
2007–2019	Australia	11	(0)
- * Club domestic league appearances and goals as of 10:34, 28 December 2018 (UTC) ‡ National team caps and goals as of 6 March 2019

Teresa Polias, born 16 May 1990) is an Australian former professional soccer player for the Central Coast Mariners (2008-2010) and Sydney FC (2010-2021) in the Australian W-League. Polias is a midfielder.

== Club career ==
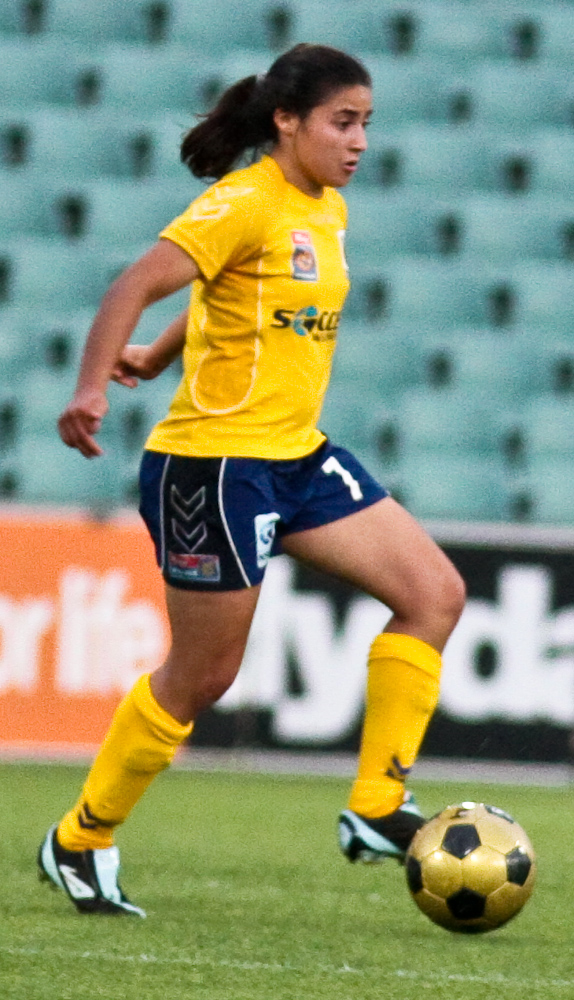
Polias playing for the Central Coast Mariners

Polias made her W-League debut on 25 October 2008, for the Central Coast Mariners, playing against Melbourne Victory. She was named Sydney FC player of the year in the 2011–12 W-League season. She was a member of the Sydney FC Women's team who won the 2012–13 W-League Championship and played the entirety of every match of that season, including the Grand Final. She scored her first ever W-League goal in a 3–2 win over Melbourne City, with a long range effort which rocketed straight into the top corner. Polias was captain of the Sydney FC Women's team who won the 2018–19 W-League Championship; and played the entirety of every match of that season, including the Grand Final. In August 2021, she took a break from football to start a family and decide if she wants to continue playing.

== International career ==
Polias represented Australia in the Young Matildas starting 11 on many occasions and travelled to Europe and Asia with the team.

== Personal life ==
Polias was born in 1990 in Darlinghurst, New South Wales and grew up in Sydney's southern suburbs and attended Endeavour Sports High School.

As well as playing football, Polias works full-time as a primary school teacher.
