= W-League transfers for 2018–19 season =

This is a list of Australian soccer transfers for the 2018–19 W-League. Only moves featuring at least one W-League club are listed.

== Transfers ==
All players without a flag are Australian. Clubs without a flag are clubs participating in the W-League.

=== Pre-season ===
Date	Name	Moving from	Moving to
15 February 2018	(Norway) Elise Thorsnes	Canberra United	(United States) Utah Royals FC
18 March 2018	(Netherlands) Marlous Pieëte	Western Sydney Wanderers	Retired
8 April 2018	(South Korea) Jeon Ga-eul	Melbourne Victory	(South Korea) Hwacheon KSPO
25 May 2018	(New Zealand) Emma Rolston	Sydney FC	(Germany) MSV Duisburg
27 May 2018	Ayesha Norrie	Brisbane Roar	(United States) LA Galaxy OC
13 July 2018	Alex Chidiac	Adelaide United	(Spain) Atlético Madrid
21 July 2018	Caitlin Munoz	Canberra United	Unattached
2 August 2018	(United States) Makenzy Doniak	Adelaide United	(United States) North Carolina Courage (end of loan)
3 August 2018	(England) Laura Bassett	Canberra United	Unattached
3 August 2018	(United States) Haley Kopmeyer	Canberra United	(United States) Orlando Pride (Note: Kopmeyer was originally loaned to Canberra United by Seattle Reign FC, but was traded to Orlando Pride during the 2017–18 season.)
3 August 2018	(United States) Toni Pressley	Canberra United	(United States) Orlando Pride (end of loan)
3 August 2018	Nikola Orgill	Newcastle Jets	Canberra United
3 August 2018	Natasha Prior	Newcastle Jets	Canberra United
20 August 2018	Larissa Crummer	Melbourne City	Newcastle Jets
20 August 2018	(South Africa) Refiloe Jane	(South Africa) Vaal University of Technology	Canberra United
20 August 2018	(South Africa) Rhoda Mulaudzi	(South Africa) Mamelodi Sundowns	Canberra United
24 August 2018	Leena Khamis	Sydney FC	Western Sydney Wanderers
24 August 2018	Kylie Ledbrook	Sydney FC	Western Sydney Wanderers
24 August 2018	Georgia Yeoman-Dale	Sydney FC	Western Sydney Wanderers
24 August 2018	Michelle Heyman	Canberra United	Adelaide United
24 August 2018	Eliza Campbell	Adelaide United	Perth Glory
28 August 2018	Melissa Maizels	Perth Glory	Canberra United
31 August 2018	Servet Uzunlar	Unattached	Western Sydney Wanderers
2 September 2018	(Israel) Lee Falkon	Western Sydney Wanderers	(Israel) Ramat HaSharon
3 September 2018	Remy Siemsen	Sydney FC	Western Sydney Wanderers
4 September 2018	(United States) Tori Huster	Newcastle Jets	(United States) Washington Spirit (end of loan)
4 September 2018	Courtney Nevin	(Australia) Football NSW Institute	Western Sydney Wanderers
5 September 2018	Alanna Kennedy	Melbourne City	Sydney FC
7 September 2018	Amy Sayer	Canberra United	Sydney FC
7 September 2018	Jacynta Galabadaarachchi	Unattached	Perth Glory
7 September 2018	Caitlin Cooper	Sydney FC	Western Sydney Wanderers
14 September 2018	Sham Khamis	Sydney FC	Canberra United
16 September 2018	Patricia Charalambous	Perth Glory	(Cyprus) Apollon Ladies
17 September 2018	(Turkey) Gülcan Koca	Melbourne Victory	Retired
21 September 2018	Emily Gielnik	Brisbane Roar	Melbourne Victory
21 September 2018	Dylan Holmes	(Australia) Adelaide City	Adelaide United
23 September 2018	Grace Maher	Canberra United	Melbourne Victory
24 September 2018	Helen Cáceres	Unattached	Melbourne City
24 September 2018	Adriana Jones	Adelaide United	Melbourne City
24 September 2018	Elise Kellond-Knight	(Sweden) Hammarby	Melbourne City
24 September 2018	Tameka Butt	Brisbane Roar	Melbourne City
25 September 2018	(Wales) Jess Fishlock	Melbourne City	(France) Olympique Lyon (Note: Fishlock returned from loan to her parent club Seattle Reign FC before being loaned to Olympique Lyon)
27 September 2018	Kahlia Hogg	Western Sydney Wanderers	Adelaide United
28 September 2018	Liana Danaskos	Canberra United	Western Sydney Wanderers
28 September 2018	Caitlin Jarvie	(Spain) Paradinyes	Western Sydney Wanderers
28 September 2018	(United States) Sofia Huerta	(United States) Houston Dash	Sydney FC (loan)
28 September 2018	(United States) Danielle Colaprico	Adelaide United (Note: Colaprico returned from loan to her parent club Chicago Red Stars before being loaned to Sydney FC)	Sydney FC
2 October 2018	(United States) Ashley Hatch	Melbourne City	(United States) Washington Spirit (Note: Hatch was originally loaned to Melbourne City by North Carolina Courage, but was traded to Washington Spirit during the 2017–18 season.)
2 October 2018	(United States) Christina Gibbons	Melbourne Victory	(United States) Sky Blue FC (Note: Gibbons was originally loaned to Melbourne Victory by FC Kansas City, but was traded to Sky Blue FC during the 2017–18 season.)
2 October 2018	(United States) Kristen McNabb	Melbourne Victory	(United States) Seattle Reign FC (end of loan)
2 October 2018	(United States) Amanda Frisbie	Perth Glory	(United States) Sky Blue FC (Note: Frisbie was originally loaned to Perth Glory by Boston Breakers, but was drafted by Sky Blue FC during the 2017–18 season.)
2 October 2018	(Costa Rica) Raquel Rodríguez	Perth Glory	(United States) Sky Blue FC (end of loan)
2 October 2018	(United States) Emily Sonnett	Perth Glory	(United States) Portland Thorns FC (end of loan)
2 October 2018	Gabrielle Dal Busco	Perth Glory	Unattached
2 October 2018	Danielle Brogan	Perth Glory	Unattached
2 October 2018	Shawn Billam	Perth Glory	Unattached
2 October 2018	Jaymee Gibbons	Perth Glory	Unattached
2 October 2018	Marianna Tabain	Perth Glory	Unattached
3 October 2018	Leticia McKenna	(Australia) Football West NTC	Perth Glory
3 October 2018	Jenna McCormick	Adelaide United	Brisbane Roar
5 October 2018	(United States) Taylor Smith	(United States) Washington Spirit	Newcastle Jets (loan)
5 October 2018	(England) Chioma Ubogagu	(United States) Orlando Pride	Brisbane Roar (loan)
5 October 2018	Ella Mastrantonio	Unattached	Melbourne Victory
6 October 2018	(Japan) Yūki Nagasato	(United States) Chicago Red Stars	Brisbane Roar (loan)
8 October 2018	Annalee Grove	Newcastle Jets	Brisbane Roar
9 October 2018	Meaghan McElligott	(Australia) Moreton Bay Jets	Canberra United
9 October 2018	(United States) Alyssa Mautz	Adelaide United (Note: Mautz returned from loan to her parent club Chicago Red Stars before being loaned to Perth Glory)	Perth Glory
10 October 2018	(United States) Katie Naughton	Adelaide United (Note: Naughton returned from loan to her parent club Chicago Red Stars before being loaned to Perth Glory)	Perth Glory
11 October 2018	(Denmark) Theresa Nielsen	(United States) Seattle Reign FC	Melbourne City (loan)
11 October 2018	(United States) Jasmyne Spencer	(United States) Seattle Reign FC	Melbourne City (loan)
11 October 2018	(Ghana) Elizabeth Addo	(United States) Seattle Reign FC	Western Sydney Wanderers (loan)
11 October 2018	(Scotland) Rachel Corsie	(United States) Utah Royals FC	Canberra United (loan)
12 October 2018	(Iceland) Gunnhildur Yrsa Jónsdóttir	(United States) Utah Royals FC	Adelaide United (loan)
12 October 2018	(Iceland) Fanndís Friðriksdóttir	(Iceland) Valur	Adelaide United (loan)
12 October 2018	Grace Henry	(Australia) Queens Park FC (WA WPL)	Perth Glory
12 October 2018	Charlotte Grant	(Australia) FFSA NTC	Adelaide United
13 October 2018	(United States) Amber Brooks	(United States) Houston Dash	Adelaide United (loan)
16 October 2018	(United States) Dani Weatherholt	(United States) Orlando Pride	Melbourne Victory (loan)
16 October 2018	(United States) Christine Nairn	(United States) Orlando Pride	Melbourne Victory (loan)
16 October 2018	(United States) Veronica Latsko	(United States) Houston Dash	Adelaide United (loan)
18 October 2018	(United States) Sydney Miramontez	(United States) Utah Royals FC	Western Sydney Wanderers (loan)
18 October 2018	(Republic of Ireland) Denise O'Sullivan	(United States) North Carolina Courage	Canberra United (loan)
20 October 2018	Jenna Onions	(Australia) Queens Park FC (WA WPL)	Perth Glory
22 October 2018	(United States) Samantha Johnson	(United States) Utah Royals FC	Melbourne Victory (loan)
23 October 2018	(Hong Kong) Cheung Wai Ki	Brisbane Roar	Unattached
23 October 2018	Amy Chapman	Brisbane Roar	Unattached
23 October 2018	Lucina Pullar	Brisbane Roar	Unattached
23 October 2018	Kirsten Veeren	Brisbane Roar	Unattached
24 October 2018	(United States) Savannah McCaskill	(United States) Sky Blue FC	Sydney FC (loan)
25 October 2018	Olivia Price	Western Sydney Wanderers	Canberra United
25 October 2018	Teigen Allen	Sydney FC	Melbourne Victory
26 October 2018	(Chile) María José Rojas	(Japan) Orca Kamogawa	Canberra United
26 October 2018	Sian McLaren	Unattached	Adelaide United
26 October 2018	Meleri Mullan	(Australia) FFSA NTC	Adelaide United

=== Mid-season ===
Date	Name	Moving from	Moving to
13 November 2018	(United States) Paige Nielsen	(South Korea) Suwon UDC	Canberra United
19 November 2018	Trudy Burke	Unattached	Sydney FC
19 November 2018	Shadeene Evans	Unattached	Sydney FC
23 November 2018	(Chile) María José Rojas	Canberra United	Unattached
29 November 2018	Isabel Hodgson	(United States) ETSU Buccaneers	Adelaide United
25 December 2018	(United States) Paige Nielsen	Canberra United	Unattached
26 December 2018	Ashleigh Sykes	Unattached	Canberra United
27 December 2018	(Republic of Ireland) Denise O'Sullivan	Canberra United	(United States) North Carolina Courage (end of loan)
27 December 2018	(Chile) María José Rojas	Unattached	Canberra United
9 January 2019	(England) Jodie Taylor	Melbourne City	(United States) Reign FC (end of loan)
18 January 2019	(United States) Hailie Mace	Unattached	Melbourne City

== Re-signings ==
Date	Name	Club
17 August 2018	Taren King	Canberra United
22 August 2018	Jada Whyman	Western Sydney Wanderers
29 August 2018	Nickoletta Flannery	Canberra United
4 September 2018	Teresa Polias	Sydney FC
4 September 2018	Elizabeth Ralston	Sydney FC
4 September 2018	Rachel Soutar	Sydney FC
4 September 2018	Natalie Tobin	Sydney FC
4 September 2018	Princess Ibini	Sydney FC
4 September 2018	Ally Green	Sydney FC
4 September 2018	Taylor Ray	Sydney FC
4 September 2018	Julia Vignes	Sydney FC
4 September 2018	Angelique Hristodoulou	Sydney FC
4 September 2018	Rachel Lowe	Western Sydney Wanderers
4 September 2018	Susan Phonsongkham	Western Sydney Wanderers
5 September 2018	Emily Condon	Adelaide United
5 September 2018	Sarah Willacy	Adelaide United
5 September 2018	Emily Hodgson	Adelaide United
5 September 2018	Lisa De Vanna	Sydney FC
5 September 2018	Chloe Logarzo	Sydney FC
5 September 2018	Caitlin Foord	Sydney FC
5 September 2018	Amy Harrison	Sydney FC
17 September 2018	Georgia Campagnale	Adelaide United
17 September 2018	Chelsie Dawber	Adelaide United
18 September 2018	Jenna Kingsley	Newcastle Jets
18 September 2018	Cortnee Vine	Newcastle Jets
20 September 2018	Tara Andrews	Newcastle Jets
20 September 2018	Gema Simon	Newcastle Jets
20 September 2018	(United States) Lo'eau LaBonta	Western Sydney Wanderers
21 September 2018	(United States) Rachel Hill	Perth Glory
23 September 2018	Claire Coelho	Newcastle Jets
23 September 2018	Sophie Nenadovic	Newcastle Jets
23 September 2018	Clare Wheeler	Newcastle Jets
25 September 2018	Cassidy Davis	Newcastle Jets
25 September 2018	Hannah Brewer	Newcastle Jets
24 September 2018	Steph Catley	Melbourne City
24 September 2018	Kyah Simon	Melbourne City
24 September 2018	(Japan) Yukari Kinga	Melbourne City
24 September 2018	(New Zealand) Rebekah Stott	Melbourne City
24 September 2018	Amy Jackson	Melbourne City
24 September 2018	Melissa Barbieri	Melbourne City
24 September 2018	Rhali Dobson	Melbourne City
24 September 2018	Sofia Sakalis	Melbourne City
25 September 2018	Angie Beard	Melbourne Victory
26 September 2018	Melina Ayres	Melbourne Victory
26 September 2018	Kyra Cooney-Cross	Melbourne Victory
26 September 2018	MelindaJ Barbieri	Melbourne Victory
27 September 2018	Laura Johns	Adelaide United
27 September 2018	(England) Natasha Dowie	Melbourne Victory
28 September 2018	(United States) Aubrey Bledsoe	Sydney FC
28 September 2018	Laura Alleway	Melbourne Victory
2 October 2018	Annabel Martin	Melbourne Victory
2 October 2018	Abbey Lloyd	Brisbane Roar
2 October 2018	Summer O'Brien	Brisbane Roar
2 October 2018	Natalie Tathem	Brisbane Roar
2 October 2018	Allira Toby	Brisbane Roar
2 October 2018	Kaitlyn Torpey	Brisbane Roar
2 October 2018	Katrina Gorry	Brisbane Roar
3 October 2018	Casey Dumont	Melbourne Victory
3 October 2018	Beth Mason-Jones	Melbourne Victory
3 October 2018	Abbey Meakins	Perth Glory
3 October 2018	Morgan Aquino	Perth Glory
4 October 2018	Clare Polkinghorne	Brisbane Roar
4 October 2018	Lia Privitelli	Melbourne Victory
4 October 2018	Emily van Egmond	Newcastle Jets
4 October 2018	Sam Kerr	Perth Glory
5 October 2018	(United States) Carson Pickett	Brisbane Roar
5 October 2018	Kim Carroll	Perth Glory
5 October 2018	Sarah Carroll	Perth Glory
5 October 2018	Shannon May	Perth Glory
5 October 2018	Alexandra Gummer	Melbourne Victory
9 October 2018	(United States) Katie Stengel	Newcastle Jets
9 October 2018	Hayley Raso	Brisbane Roar
9 October 2018	(United States) Celeste Boureille	Brisbane Roar
10 October 2018	(United States) Nikki Stanton	Perth Glory
11 October 2018	Ellie Carpenter	Canberra United
11 October 2018	Lydia Williams	Melbourne City
11 October 2018	(United States) Lauren Barnes	Melbourne City
11 October 2018	(England) Jodie Taylor	Melbourne City
11 October 2018	Grace Abbey	Adelaide United
12 October 2018	Natasha Rigby	Perth Glory
17 October 2018	(United States) Britt Eckerstrom	Newcastle Jets
20 October 2018	Caitlin Doeglas	Perth Glory
21 October 2018	Aoife Colvill	Canberra United
21 October 2018	Laura Hughes	Canberra United
21 October 2018	Lauren Keir	Canberra United
21 October 2018	Madelyn Whittall	Canberra United
1 November 2018	Mackenzie Arnold	Brisbane Roar
15 November 2018	(Netherlands) Maruschka Waldus	Western Sydney Wanderers
26 November 2018	(United States) Arin Wright	Newcastle Jets
