= 2018–19 Western Sydney Wanderers FC (women) season =

Western Sydney Wanderers W-League
2018–19 season
- Manager: Dan Barrett
- Stadium: Marconi Stadium, Sydney; ANZ Stadium, Sydney
- W-League: 9th
- Top goalscorer: Kylie Ledbrook (3 goals)
Home colours	Away colours

The 2018–19 Western Sydney Wanderers W-League season was their seventh season in the W-League, the premier competition for women's soccer in Australia. The team played home games both at Marconi Stadium and ANZ Stadium and was managed by Dan Barrett.

== Players ==
=== Current squad ===
Last updated 24 November 2018.

Note: Flags indicate national team as defined under FIFA eligibility rules; some limited exceptions apply. Players may hold more than one non-FIFA nationality.

No.	Pos.	Nation	Player
1	GK	AUS	Jada Mathyssen-Whyman
2	DF	AUS	Caitlin Cooper
4	DF	NED	Maruschka Waldus
5	FW	AUS	Rachel Lowe
6	MF	AUS	Servet Uzunlar (Captain)
7	MF	USA	Lo'eau LaBonta
8	MF	AUS	Erica Halloway
9	MF	AUS	Remy Siemsen
10	MF	AUS	Kylie Ledbrook
11	FW	GHA	Elizabeth Addo

No.	Pos.	Nation	Player
12	MF	AUS	Susan Phonsongkham
13	DF	AUS	Georgia Yeoman-Dale
14	MF	AUS	Courtney Nevin
15	DF	AUS	Talitha Kramer
16	MF	AUS	Liana Danaskos
17	DF	USA	Sydney Miramontez
19	FW	AUS	Leena Khamis
20	MF	AUS	Caitlin Jarvie
21	MF	AUS	Mackenzie Hawkesby
30	GK	AUS	Nicole Simonsen

=== Transfers in ===
No.	Position	Player	Transferred from	Type/fee	Date	Ref
10	MF	Kylie Ledbrook	Sydney FC	Free transfer	24 August 2018	
13	DF	Georgia Yeoman-Dale	Sydney FC	Free transfer	24 August 2018	
19	FW	Leena Khamis	Sydney FC	Free transfer	24 August 2018	
6	MF	Servet Uzunlar		Free transfer	31 August 2018	
9	FW	Remy Siemsen	Sydney FC	Free transfer	3 September 2018	
14	FW	Courtney Nevin	(Australia) Football NSW Institute	Free transfer	4 September 2018	
2	DF	Caitlin Cooper	Sydney FC	Free transfer	7 September 2018	
16	MF	Liana Danaskos	Canberra United	Free transfer	28 September 2018	
20	MF	Caitlin Jarvie	(Spain) Pardinyes	Free transfer	28 September 2018	
11	FW	(Ghana) Elizabeth Addo	(United States) Seattle Reign FC	Loan	11 October 2018	
17	DF	(United States) Sydney Miramontez	(United States) Utah Royals FC	Loan	18 October 2018	

=== Transfers out ===
No.	Position	Player	Transferred to	Type/fee	Date	Ref
11	FW	(Netherlands) Marlous Pieëte		Retired	18 March 2018	
10	FW	(Israel) Lee Falkon	(Israel) Ramat HaSharon	Free transfer	2 September 2018	
5	DF	Kahlia Hogg	Adelaide United	Free transfer	27 September 2018	
13	MF	Olivia Price	Canberra United	Free transfer	25 October 2018	

== W-League ==
=== League table ===
Pos	Team	Pld	W	D	L	GF	GA	GD	Pts	Qualification
1	Melbourne Victory	12	7	3	2	21	15	+6	24	Qualification to Finals series and 2019 AFC Women's Club Championship
2	Brisbane Roar	12	6	2	4	18	17	+1	20	Qualification to Finals series
3	Sydney FC (C)	12	6	1	5	28	19	+9	19	Qualification to Finals series
4	Perth Glory	12	5	4	3	28	20	+8	19	Qualification to Finals series
5	Melbourne City	12	6	1	5	20	15	+5	19	
6	Adelaide United	12	5	3	4	17	19	−2	18	
7	Newcastle Jets	12	5	1	6	18	21	−3	16	
8	Canberra United	12	3	4	5	13	18	−5	13	
9	Western Sydney Wanderers	12	1	1	10	11	30	−19	4	

Source: A-Leagues
Rules for classification: 1) points; 2) goal difference; 3) number of goals scored.
(C) Champions

=== Matches ===
Win Draw Loss

25 October 2018 1	Western Sydney Wanderers	0–3	Sydney FC	Sydney
		Report	Foord 13', 76'; Logarzo 60'	Stadium: Marconi Stadium; Attendance: 1,499; Referee: Lara Lee

4 November 2018 2	Western Sydney Wanderers	0–1	Brisbane Roar	Sydney
		Report	Pickett 39'	Stadium: Marconi Stadium; Attendance: 713; Referee: Katie Patterson

17 November 2018 3	Perth Glory	3–0	Western Sydney Wanderers	Perth
	Hill 15', 57'; Kerr 42'	Report		Stadium: Dorrien Gardens; Attendance: 716; Referee: Rachel Mitchenson

24 November 2018 4	Western Sydney Wanderers	0–1	Newcastle Jets	Sydney
		Report	Kingsley 59'	Stadium: Marconi Stadium; Attendance: 652; Referee: Lara Lee

2 December 2018 5	Melbourne Victory	2–1	Western Sydney Wanderers	Morwell
	Dowie 13'; Nairn 39'	Report	Ledbrook 73'	Stadium: Latrobe City Stadium; Attendance: 593; Referee: Isabella Blaess

7 December 2018 6	Western Sydney Wanderers	2–2	Canberra United	Sydney
	Khamis 65'; Ledbrook 87'	Report	Carpenter 52'; Uzunlar 85' (o.g.)	Stadium: Spotless Stadium; Attendance: 1,321; Referee: Rachel Mitchenson

20 December 2018 8	Brisbane Roar	3–1	Western Sydney Wanderers	Brisbane
	Miramontez 34' (o.g.); Riley 70'; Toby 86'	Report	Yeoman-Dale 63'	Stadium: Dolphin Oval; Attendance: 2,389; Referee: Casey Reibelt

1 January 2019 9	Western Sydney Wanderers	1–2	Melbourne City	Sydney
	Yeoman-Dale 14'	Report	Butt 38'; Jones 81'	Stadium: ANZ Stadium; Attendance: 3,811; Referee: Rebecca Durcau

10 January 2019 11	Sydney FC	3–0	Western Sydney Wanderers	Sydney
	Huerta 39'; Foord 64', 80'	Report		Stadium: Leichhardt Oval; Attendance: 1,511; Referee: Rebecca Durcau

19 January 2019 12	Adelaide United	1–4	Western Sydney Wanderers	Adelaide
	Latsko 41'	Report	Lowe 2'; Ledbrook 61' (pen.); Halloway 90'; Addo 90+7'	Stadium: Marden Sports Complex; Attendance: 937; Referee: Isabella Blaess

24 January 2019 13	Western Sydney Wanderers	1–5	Perth Glory	Sydney
	Khamis 27'	Report	Moreno 9'; Naughton 39'; Kerr 70', 81'; Hill 84'	Stadium: Marconi Stadium; Attendance: 951; Referee: Katie Patterson

2 February 2019 14	Newcastle Jets	4–1	Western Sydney Wanderers	Newcastle
	Tamplin 43'; Andrews 55'; Collister 70'; Vine 79'	Report	Addo 66'	Stadium: No.2 Sportsground; Attendance: 1,209; Referee: Georgia Ghirardello

=== Results summary ===
Overall								Home						Away					
Pld	W	D	L	GF	GA	GD	Pts	W	D	L	GF	GA	GD	W	D	L	GF	GA	GD
12	1	1	10	11	30	−19	4	0	1	5	4	14	−10	1	0	5	7	16	−9

Last updated: February 2019, end of regular season.
Source: Competitive Matches

=== Results by round ===
Round	1	2	3	4	5	6	7	8	9	10	11	12	13	14
Ground	H	H	A	H	A	H	B	A	H	B	A	A	H	A
Result	L	L	L	L	L	D	✖	L	L	✖	L	W	L	L
Position	9	9	9	9	9	9	9	9	9	9	9	9	9	9

Updated to match(es) played on February 2019. Source: Competitive Matches
A = Away; H = Home; B = Bye; W = Win; D = Draw; L = Loss
