= 2018–19 Sydney FC (women) season =

Sydney FC (W-League)
2018–19 season
- Manager: Ante Juric
- Stadium: Seymour Shaw Park, Jubilee Oval, Leichhardt Oval, WIN Stadium
- W-League: 3rd
- Finals Series: Champions
- Top goalscorer: Caitlin Foord (7 goals)
| Home colours | Away colours | Third colours |

The 2018–19 Sydney FC W-League season was the club's eleventh season in the W-League, the premier competition for women's soccer in Australia. This season the team played their home games at Seymour Shaw Park, Jubilee Oval, Leichhardt Oval and WIN Stadium. The club was managed by Ante Juric.

== Players ==
=== Squad information ===
Last updated 24 October 2018

Note: Flags indicate national team as defined under FIFA eligibility rules; some limited exceptions apply. Players may hold more than one non-FIFA nationality.

| No. | Pos. | Nation | Player |
|---|---|---|---|
| 1 | GK | USA | Aubrey Bledsoe |
| 2 | MF | AUS | Teresa Polias |
| 3 | FW | AUS | Shadeene Evans |
| 4 | DF | AUS | Elizabeth Ralston |
| 5 | MF | AUS | Ally Green |
| 6 | MF | AUS | Chloe Logarzo |
| 7 | DF | AUS | Rachael Soutar |
| 8 | DF | AUS | Amy Harrison |
| 9 | MF | AUS | Caitlin Foord |
| 10 | FW | USA | Savannah McCaskill |
| 11 | FW | AUS | Lisa De Vanna |

| No. | Pos. | Nation | Player |
|---|---|---|---|
| 12 | MF | AUS | Natalie Tobin |
| 14 | DF | AUS | Alanna Kennedy |
| 17 | DF | AUS | Angelique Hristodoulou |
| 18 | DF | AUS | Taylor Ray |
| 19 | MF | AUS | Amy Sayer |
| 20 | FW | AUS | Princess Ibini |
| 21 | DF | AUS | Julia Vignes |
| 22 | MF | USA | Sofia Huerta |
| 23 | MF | USA | Danielle Colaprico |
| 30 | GK | AUS | Trudy Burke |

=== Transfers in ===
| No. | Pos. | Nat. | Name | Age | Moving from | Type | Transfer window | Ends | Transfer fee | Source |
|---|---|---|---|---|---|---|---|---|---|---|
| 14 | DF | (Australia) | Alanna Kennedy | 23 | Melbourne City | Transfer | Pre-season | | | |
| 19 | MF | (Australia) | Amy Sayer | 16 | Canberra United | Transfer | Pre-season | | | |
| 1 | GK | (United States) | Aubrey Bledsoe | 26 | (United States) Washington Spirit | Loan | Pre-season | | | |
| 22 | MF | (United States) | Sofia Huerta | 25 | (United States) Houston Dash | Loan | Pre-season | | | |
| 23 | MF | (United States) | Danielle Colaprico | 25 | (United States) Chicago Red Stars | Loan | Pre-season | | | |
| 10 | FW | (United States) | Savannah McCaskill | 22 | (United States) Sky Blue FC | Loan | Pre-season | | | |
| 30 | GK | (Australia) | Trudy Burke | 27 | | Transfer | Mid-season | | | |
| 3 | FW | (Australia) | Shadeene Evans | 16 | | Transfer | Mid-season | | | |

=== Transfers out ===
| No. | Pos. | Nat. | Name | Age | Moving to | Type | Transfer window | Transfer fee | Source |
|---|---|---|---|---|---|---|---|---|---|
| 15 | DF | (Australia) | Caitlin Cooper | 30 | Western Sydney Wanderers | Transfer | Pre-season | | |
| 1 | GK | (Australia) | Sham Khamis | 23 | Canberra United | Transfer | Pre-season | | |
| 3 | FW | (Australia) | Remy Siemsen | 18 | Western Sydney Wanderers | Transfer | Pre-season | | |
| 10 | MF | (Australia) | Kylie Ledbrook | 32 | Western Sydney Wanderers | Transfer | Pre-season | | |
| 13 | DF | (Australia) | Georgia Yeoman-Dale | 24 | Western Sydney Wanderers | Transfer | Pre-season | | |
| 14 | FW | (New Zealand) | Emma Rolston | 21 | (Germany) MSV Duisburg | Transfer | Pre-season | | |
| 16 | DF | (United States) | Emily Sonnett | 24 | (United States) Portland Thorns FC | Loan return | Pre-season | | |
| 19 | FW | (Australia) | Leena Khamis | 32 | Western Sydney Wanderers | Transfer | Pre-season | | |
| 12 | DF | (Australia) | Teigen Allen | 24 | Melbourne Victory | Transfer | Pre-season | | |

== Managerial staff ==
| Position | Name |
|---|---|
| Head coach | (Australia) Ante Juric |
| Head Assistant Coach | Vince Milicevic |
| Assistant Coach | (Australia) Anthony Harb |

== W-League ==
=== League table ===
| Pos | Team | Pld | W | D | L | GF | GA | GD | Pts | Qualification |
|---|---|---|---|---|---|---|---|---|---|---|
| 1 | Melbourne Victory | 12 | 7 | 3 | 2 | 21 | 15 | +6 | 24 | Qualification to Finals series and 2019 AFC Women's Club Championship |
| 2 | Brisbane Roar | 12 | 6 | 2 | 4 | 18 | 17 | +1 | 20 | Qualification to Finals series |
| 3 | Sydney FC (C) | 12 | 6 | 1 | 5 | 28 | 19 | +9 | 19 | Qualification to Finals series |
| 4 | Perth Glory | 12 | 5 | 4 | 3 | 28 | 20 | +8 | 19 | Qualification to Finals series |
| 5 | Melbourne City | 12 | 6 | 1 | 5 | 20 | 15 | +5 | 19 | |
| 6 | Adelaide United | 12 | 5 | 3 | 4 | 17 | 19 | −2 | 18 | |
| 7 | Newcastle Jets | 12 | 5 | 1 | 6 | 18 | 21 | −3 | 16 | |
| 8 | Canberra United | 12 | 3 | 4 | 5 | 13 | 18 | −5 | 13 | |
| 9 | Western Sydney Wanderers | 12 | 1 | 1 | 10 | 11 | 30 | −19 | 4 | |

Source: A-Leagues
Rules for classification: 1) points; 2) goal difference; 3) number of goals scored.
(C) Champions

=== Matches ===
Win Draw Loss

| 25 October 2018 1 | Western Sydney Wanderers | 0–3 | Sydney FC | Sydney |
| | | Report | Foord 13', 76'; Logarzo 60' | Stadium: Marconi Stadium; Attendance: 1,499; Referee: Lara Lee |

| 2 November 2018 2 | Melbourne City | 3–1 | Sydney FC | Melbourne |
| | Spencer 13', 48', 60' | Report | Sayer 21' | Stadium: AAMI Park; Attendance: 3,696; Referee: Rebecca Durcau |

| 24 November 2018 4 | Sydney FC | 2–3 | Melbourne Victory | Sydney |
| | Logarzo 39'; Kennedy 83' | Report | Dowie 5', 45+1' (pen.), 51' | Stadium: Netstrata Jubilee Stadium; Attendance: 5,540; Referee: Rachel Mitchenson |

| 2 December 2018 5 | Canberra United | 2–0 | Sydney FC | Canberra |
| | Mulaudzi 45+4'; Roestbakken 60' | Report | | Stadium: McKellar Park; Attendance: 1,537; Referee: Katie Patterson |

| 9 December 2018 6 | Sydney FC | 5–1 | Brisbane Roar | Sydney |
| | Foord 15', 67', 83'; Polias 59'; Ibini 70' | Report | Nagasato 25' | Stadium: Seymour Shaw Park; Attendance: 1,566; Referee: Lara Lee |

| 13 December 2018 7 | Sydney FC | 5–2 | Adelaide United | Sydney |
| | Huerta 45+4'; Colaprico 58'; McCaskill 71'; Ibini 88', 90+4' | Report | Latsko 22', 66' | Stadium: Cromer Park; Attendance: 2,226; Referee: Rachel Mitchenson |

| 21 December 2018 8 | Perth Glory | 2–1 | Sydney FC | Perth |
| | Kerr 47', 85' | Report | Kennedy 27' | Stadium: nib Stadium; Attendance: 1,179; Referee: Kate Jacewicz |

| 4 January 2019 10 | Sydney FC | 3–1 | Newcastle Jets | Sydney |
| | McCaskill 28', 90+5'; Ibini 77' | Report | Copus-Brown 82' | Stadium: Netstrata Jubilee Stadium; Attendance: 2,997; Referee: Katie Patterson |

| 10 January 2019 11 | Sydney FC | 3–0 | Western Sydney Wanderers | Sydney |
| | Huerta 39'; Foord 64', 80' | Report | | Stadium: Leichhardt Oval; Attendance: 1,511; Referee: Rebecca Durcau |

| 19 January 2019 12 | Brisbane Roar | 1–3 | Sydney FC | Brisbane |
| | Toby 41' | Report | Tobin 31'; Foord 38' (pen.) 75' | Stadium: Lions Stadium; Attendance: 2,118; Referee: Lara Lee |

| 27 January 2019 13 | Melbourne Victory | 2–2 | Sydney FC | Melbourne |
| | Gielnik 68'; Dowie 78' | Report | Kennedy 35'; Logarzo 71' | Stadium: Lakeside Stadium; Attendance: 784; Referee: Casey Reibelt |

| 31 January 2019 14 | Sydney FC | 0–2 | Melbourne City | Wollongong |
| | | Report | Caceres 67'; Butt 86' | Stadium: WIN Stadium; Attendance: 1,415; Referee: Lara Lee |

==== Finals Series ====
| 10 February 2019 Semi-final | Brisbane Roar | 1–2 | Sydney FC | Brisbane |
| 18:15 AEST | Nagasato 90+2' | Source | Foord 33'; Huerta 68' | Stadium: Dolphin Oval; Attendance: 4,271; Referee: Rebecca Durcau |

| 16 February 2019 Grand final | Sydney FC | 4–2 | Perth Glory | Sydney |
| 16:30 AEDT | Huerta 6'; McCaskill 41', 61'; Logarzo 70' | Report | Kerr 23' (pen.); Mautz 68' | Stadium: Netstrata Jubilee Stadium; Attendance: 6,127; Referee: Kate Jacewicz |

=== Results summary ===
| Overall | | | | | | | | Home | | | | | | Away | | | | | |
| Pld | W | D | L | GF | GA | GD | Pts | W | D | L | GF | GA | GD | W | D | L | GF | GA | GD |
|---|---|---|---|---|---|---|---|---|---|---|---|---|---|---|---|---|---|---|---|
| 12 | 5 | 1 | 6 | 28 | 19 | +9 | 16 | 4 | 0 | 2 | 18 | 9 | +9 | 1 | 1 | 4 | 10 | 10 | 0 |

Last updated: February 2019, end of regular season.
Source: Competitive Matches

=== Results by round ===
| Round | 1 | 2 | 3 | 4 | 5 | 6 | 7 | 8 | 9 | 10 | 11 | 12 | 13 | 14 |
|---|---|---|---|---|---|---|---|---|---|---|---|---|---|---|
| Ground | A | A | B | H | A | H | H | A | B | H | H | A | A | H |
| Result | W | L | ✖ | L | L | W | W | L | ✖ | W | W | W | D | L |
| Position | 1 | 4 | 6 | 7 | 8 | 7 | 4 | 6 | 6 | 6 | 4 | 2 | 3 | 3 |

Updated to match(es) played on February 2019. Source: Competitive Matches
A = Away; H = Home; B = Bye; W = Win; D = Draw; L = Loss
