= 2018–19 Melbourne City FC (women) season =

Melbourne City W-League
2018–19 season
- Manager: Rado Vidošić
- Stadium: CB Smith Reserve, Melbourne; AAMI Park, Melbourne
- W-League: 5th
- Top goalscorer: Jasmyne Spencer (4 goals)
Home colours	Away colours

The 2018–19 Melbourne City FC W-League season was the club's fourth season in the W-League, the premier competition for women's soccer in Australia. The team was based at the City Football Academy at La Trobe University and played home games at both AAMI Park and CB Smith Reserve. Melbourne City entered the season having won the past three W-League grand finals. This is the first season they were without Jess Fishlock as she joined Olympique Lyonnais instead of playing in the W-League.

On 19 June 2018 Rado Vidošić was appointed as the new head coach.

== Players ==
=== Squad information ===
Melbourne City's Women squad, updated 27 October 2018.

Note: Flags indicate national team as defined under FIFA eligibility rules; some limited exceptions apply. Players may hold more than one non-FIFA nationality.

No.	Pos.	Nation	Player
1	GK	AUS	Lydia Williams
2	DF	JPN	Yukari Kinga
3	DF	USA	Lauren Barnes
4	DF	AUS	Chelsea Blissett
5	FW	AUS	Helen Cáceres
7	DF	AUS	Steph Catley
8	FW	AUS	Elise Kellond-Knight
10	MF	AUS	Nia Stamatopoulos
11	FW	AUS	Rhali Dobson
12	FW	AUS	Adriana Jones
13	DF	NZL	Rebekah Stott

No.	Pos.	Nation	Player
14	FW	AUS	Shelby Green (train-on player)
15	MF	AUS	Amy Jackson
16	MF	AUS	Sofia Sakalis
17	FW	AUS	Kyah Simon
19	DF	AUS	Tyla-Jay Vlajnic
21	FW	AUS	Janna Lawson
22	FW	USA	Jasmyne Spencer
23	GK	AUS	Melissa Barbieri
31	MF	AUS	Tameka Butt
88	DF	DEN	Theresa Nielsen

=== Transfers in ===
No.	Pos.	Nat.	Name	Age	Moving from	Type	Transfer window	Ends	Transfer fee	Source
5	FW	(Australia)	Helen Caceres	25	Western Sydney Wanderers	Transfer	Pre-season			
12	FW	(Australia)	Adriana Jones		Adelaide United	Transfer	Pre-season			
8	MF	(Australia)	Elise Kellond-Knight	28	(Sweden) Hammarby	Transfer	Pre-season			
31	MF	(Australia)	Tameka Butt	27	(Norway) Klepp IL	Transfer	Pre-season			
88	DF	(Denmark)	Theresa Nielsen	32	(United States) Seattle Reign	Loan	Pre-season			
22	FW	(United States)	Jasmyne Spencer	28	(United States) Seattle Reign	Loan	Pre-season			
9	MF	(Australia)	Nia Stamatopoulos	15		Youth	Pre-season			
4	DF	(Australia)	Chelsea Blissett	18	South Melbourne	Transfer	Pre-season			

=== Transfers out ===
No.	Pos.	Nat.	Name	Age	Moving to	Type	Transfer window	Transfer fee	Source
10	MF	(Wales)	Jess Fishlock	31	(United States) Seattle Reign	Loan Return	Pre-season		
4	FW	(United States)	Ashley Hatch	23	(United States) North Carolina Courage	Loan Return	Pre-season		
14	DF	(Australia)	Alanna Kennedy	23	Sydney FC	Transfer	Pre-season		
9	FW	(England)	Jodie Taylor	32	(United States) Reign FC	Loan Return	Pre-season		

== W-League ==
=== League table ===
Pos	Team	Pld	W	D	L	GF	GA	GD	Pts	Qualification
1	Melbourne Victory	12	7	3	2	21	15	+6	24	Qualification to Finals series and 2019 AFC Women's Club Championship
2	Brisbane Roar	12	6	2	4	18	17	+1	20	Qualification to Finals series
3	Sydney FC (C)	12	6	1	5	28	19	+9	19	Qualification to Finals series
4	Perth Glory	12	5	4	3	28	20	+8	19	Qualification to Finals series
5	Melbourne City	12	6	1	5	20	15	+5	19	
6	Adelaide United	12	5	3	4	17	19	−2	18	
7	Newcastle Jets	12	5	1	6	18	21	−3	16	
8	Canberra United	12	3	4	5	13	18	−5	13	
9	Western Sydney Wanderers	12	1	1	10	11	30	−19	4	

Source: A-Leagues
Rules for classification: 1) points; 2) goal difference; 3) number of goals scored.
(C) Champions

=== Matches ===
Win Draw Loss

28 October 2018 1	Canberra United	2–0	Melbourne City	Canberra
16:00 AEDT	Mulaudzi 57'; Carpenter 85'	Report		Stadium: McKellar Park; Attendance: 1,679; Referee: Katie Patterson

2 November 2018 2	Melbourne City	3–1	Sydney FC	Melbourne
17:20 AEDT	Spencer 13', 48', 60'	Report	Sayer 21'	Stadium: AAMI Park; Attendance: 3,696; Referee: Rebecca Durcau

16 November 2018 3	Melbourne City	0–2	Melbourne Victory	Melbourne
19:30 AEDT		Report	Kellond-Knight 31' (o.g.); Gielnik 65'	Stadium: AAMI Park; Attendance: 1,619; Referee: Kate Jacewicz

25 November 2018 4	Perth Glory	5–2	Melbourne City	Perth
18:45 AEDT	Kerr 10', 52'; Hill 21'; Mautz 65', 90+4'	Report	Kellond-Knight 49', 69' (pen.)	Stadium: nib Stadium; Attendance: 2,358; Referee: Katie Patterson

1 December 2018 5	Melbourne City	1–1	Adelaide United	Melbourne
19:30 AEDT	Simon 54' (pen.)	Report	Campagnale 90+7'	Stadium: CB Smith Reserve; Attendance: 500; Referee: Lara Lee

9 December 2018 6	Newcastle Jets	1–3	Melbourne City	Newcastle
14:30 AEDT	Stengel 54'	Report	Kinga 30'; Butt 34'; Spencer 72'	Stadium: McDonald Jones Stadium; Attendance: 3,383; Referee: Casey Reibelt

22 December 2018 8	Melbourne City	3–0	Canberra United	Melbourne
17:00 AEDT	Dobson 8', 45+2'; Simon 36'	Report		Stadium: AAMI Park; Attendance: 3,830; Referee: Rebecca Durcau

1 January 2019 9	Western Sydney Wanderers	1–2	Melbourne City	Sydney
17:20 AEDT	Yeoman-Dale 14'	Report	Butt 38'; Jones 81'	Stadium: ANZ Stadium; Attendance: 3,811; Referee: Rebecca Durcau

5 January 2019 10	Melbourne Victory	1–0	Melbourne City	Melbourne
16:00 AEDT	Nairn 88'	Report		Stadium: Epping Stadium; Attendance: 1,265; Referee: Lara Lee

11 January 2019 11	Melbourne City	0–1	Brisbane Roar	Melbourne
17:20 AEDT		Report	Ubagagu 74'	Stadium: AAMI Park; Attendance: 3,760; Referee: Kate Jacewicz

20 January 2019 12	Melbourne City	4–0	Newcastle Jets	Melbourne
	Kinga 31' (pen.), 58'; Catley 37'; Mace 69'	Report		Stadium: CB Smith Reserve; Attendance: 425; Referee: Katie Patterson

31 January 2019 14	Sydney FC	0–2	Melbourne City	Wollongong
		Report	Caceres 67'; Butt 86'	Stadium: WIN Stadium; Attendance: 1,415; Referee: Lara Lee

=== Results summary ===
Overall								Home						Away					
Pld	W	D	L	GF	GA	GD	Pts	W	D	L	GF	GA	GD	W	D	L	GF	GA	GD
12	6	1	5	20	15	+5	19	3	1	2	11	5	+6	3	0	3	9	10	−1

Last updated: February 2019, end of regular season.
Source: Competitive Matches

=== Results by round ===
Round	1	2	3	4	5	6	7	8	9	10	11	12	13	14
Ground	A	H	H	A	H	A	B	H	A	A	H	H	B	A
Result	L	W	L	L	D	W	✖	W	W	L	L	W	✖	W
Position	8	5	8	8	7	5	8	5	5	5	6	5	5	5

Updated to match(es) played on February 2019. Source: Competitive Matches
A = Away; H = Home; B = Bye; W = Win; D = Draw; L = Loss
