= 2018–19 Melbourne Victory FC (women) season =

Melbourne Victory W-League
2018–19 season
- Head coach: Jeff Hopkins
- W-League: 1st
- Top goalscorer: Natasha Dowie (6 goals)
Home colours	Away colours

The 2018–19 Melbourne Victory W-League season was the club's eleventh season in the W-League, the premier competition for women's soccer in Australia. The team played home games at Epping Stadium, Lakeside Stadium and AAMI Park. The club's head coach for the season was Jeff Hopkins.

== Background ==
The Victory entered the season having missed out on the final series in the previous three years. In 2017–18, while they had improved defensively, they only finished a point off last place. Media predictions had them finishing in the top four in 2018–19, with former player Gülcan Koca suggesting they could win the premiership/championship double.

== W-League ==
=== Regular season ===
The Victory opened their campaign with a match against Adelaide United at AAMI Park. Despite having 60 percent of possession, they were not able to convert any of their 21 shots at goal.

Playing Newcastle Jets on 1 November at Lakeside Stadium, the Victory took an early lead with Melina Ayres scoring a long-range goal after seven minutes. Natasha Dowie made the score 2–0 in the 11th minute before Cortnee Vine pulled a goal back for the Jets a minute later.

The Victory match against Canberra United on 17 January at Seiffert Oval in Queanbeyan was abandoned after 16 minutes due to lightning. A rematch was scheduled for 5 February at McKellar Park in Canberra.

A 2–1 victory over Perth Glory at Dorrien Gardens secured the club's first W-League premiership. The Victory entered the match needing a point to win the trophy after Brisbane Roar were unexpectedly defeated.

The makeup game against Canberra United at McKellar Park on 5 January wasdelayed for 35 minutes due to lightning. Victory rested several first-choice players in preparation for the semi-final five days later. The match ended 0–0 and the Victory were awarded the Premier's Plate after the match.

Date	Opponent	Venue	Result	Scorers	Attendance	Referee	Refs
28 October 2018	Adelaide United	Home	0–0		2,714	Isabella Blaess	
1 November 2018	Newcastle Jets	Home	2–1	Ayres, Dowie	713	Rachel Mitchenson	
16 November 2018	Melbourne City	Away	2–0	Nairn, Gielnik	1,619	Kate Jacewicz	
24 November 2018	Sydney FC	Away	3–2	Dowie (3)	5,540	Rachel Mitchenson	
2 December 2018	Western Sydney Wanderers	Home	2–1	Dowie, Nairn	593	Isabella Blaess	
16 December 2018	Brisbane Roar	Away	3–4	Nairn, Dowie, Gielnik	1,045	Katie Patterson	
21 December 2018	Adelaide United	Away	2–3	Mastrantonio, Alleway	902	Katie Patterson	
28 December 2018	Perth Glory	Home	2–1	Dowie (2)	7,163	Rachel Mitchenson	
5 January 2019	Melbourne City	Home	1–0	Nairn	1,265	Lara Lee	
27 January 2019	Sydney FC	Home	2–2	Gielnik, Dowie	784	Katie Patterson	
1 February 2019	Perth Glory	Away	2–1	Nairn, Gielnik	1,110	Georgia Ghirardello	
5 February 2019	Canberra United	Away	0–0		1,546	Isabella Blaess	

=== Finals ===
Date	Opponent	Venue	Result	Scorers	Attendance	Referee	Refs
10 February 2019	Perth Glory	Home	2–4 (a.e.t)	Nairn, Maher	8,599	Rachel Mitchenson	

=== League table ===
Pos	Team	Pld	W	D	L	GF	GA	GD	Pts	Qualification
1	Melbourne Victory	12	7	3	2	21	15	+6	24	Qualification to Finals series and 2019 AFC Women's Club Championship
2	Brisbane Roar	12	6	2	4	18	17	+1	20	Qualification to Finals series
3	Sydney FC (C)	12	6	1	5	28	19	+9	19	Qualification to Finals series
4	Perth Glory	12	5	4	3	28	20	+8	19	Qualification to Finals series
5	Melbourne City	12	6	1	5	20	15	+5	19	
6	Adelaide United	12	5	3	4	17	19	−2	18	
7	Newcastle Jets	12	5	1	6	18	21	−3	16	
8	Canberra United	12	3	4	5	13	18	−5	13	
9	Western Sydney Wanderers	12	1	1	10	11	30	−19	4	

Source: A-Leagues
Rules for classification: 1) points; 2) goal difference; 3) number of goals scored.
(C) Champions

=== Results summary ===
Overall								Home						Away					
Pld	W	D	L	GF	GA	GD	Pts	W	D	L	GF	GA	GD	W	D	L	GF	GA	GD
12	7	3	2	21	15	+6	24	4	2	0	9	5	+4	3	1	2	12	10	+2

Last updated: 5 February 2019.
Source: Competitive Matches

=== Results by round ===
Round	1	2	3	4	5	6	7	8	9	10	11	12	13	14
Ground	H	H	A	A	H	B	A	A	H	H	B	A	H	A
Result	D	W	W	W	W	✖	L	L	W	W	✖	D	D	W
Position	6	3	1	1	1	1	1	2	1	1	1	1	1	1

Updated to match(es) played on 5 February 2019. Source: Competitive Matches
A = Away; H = Home; B = Bye; W = Win; D = Draw; L = Loss

== Players ==
=== Squad information ===
Updated 27 October 2018. Note: Flags indicate national team as defined under FIFA eligibility rules; some limited exceptions apply. Players may hold more than one non-FIFA nationality.

No.	Pos.	Nation	Player
1	GK	AUS	Casey Dumont
3	DF	AUS	Teigen Allen
4	DF	AUS	Alexandra Gummer
5	DF	AUS	Laura Alleway
6	DF	AUS	Annabelle Martin
7	MF	USA	Christine Nairn
8	DF	AUS	Angie Beard
9	FW	ENG	Natasha Dowie (captain)
10	FW	AUS	Kyra Cooney-Cross

No.	Pos.	Nation	Player
11	MF	AUS	MelindaJ Barbieri
14	FW	AUS	Melina Ayres
15	MF	AUS	Emily Gielnik
16	DF	USA	Samantha Johnson
17	MF	USA	Dani Weatherholt
18	MF	AUS	Grace Maher
19	MF	AUS	Lia Privitelli
20	GK	AUS	Bethany Mason-Jones
21	MF	AUS	Ella Mastrantonio

=== Transfers in ===
No.	Pos.	Nat.	Name	Age	Moving from	Type	Transfer window	Ends	Transfer fee	Source
15	FW	(Australia)	Emily Gielnik	26	Brisbane Roar	Transfer	Pre-season			
18	MF	(Australia)	Grace Maher	19	Canberra United	Transfer	Pre-season			
21	MF	(Australia)	Ella Mastrantonio	26	unattached	Signed	Pre-season			
17	FW	(United States)	Dani Weatherholt	24	(United States) Orlando Pride	Loan	Pre-season			
7	MF	(United States)	Christine Nairn	28	(United States) Orlando Pride	Loan	Pre-season			
16	DF	(United States)	Samantha Johnson	27	(United States) Utah Royals FC	Loan	Pre-season			
3	DF	(Australia)	Teigen Allen	24	Sydney FC	Transfer	Pre-season			

=== Transfers out ===
No.	Pos.	Nat.	Name	Age	Moving to	Type	Transfer window	Transfer fee	Source
19	DF	(United States)	Kristen McNabb	24	(United States) Seattle Reign	Loan return	Pre-season		
31	DF	(United States)	Christina Gibbons	22	(United States) Sky Blue FC	Loan return	Pre-season		
17	MF	(Turkey)	Gülcan Koca	28		Retired	Pre-season		
7	FW	(South Korea)	Jeon Ga-eul	30	(South Korea) Hwacheon KSPO WFC	Transfer	Pre-season		
