= 2019 W-League grand final =

- Event: 2018–19 W-League
Sydney FC	Perth Glory
4	2
- Date: 16 February 2019
- Venue: Netstrata Jubilee Stadium, Sydney
- Player of the Match: Savannah McCaskill
- Referee: Kate Jacewicz
- Attendance: 6,127

The 2019 W-League grand final was the final match of the 2018–19 W-League season to decide the champions of women's soccer in Australia for the season.

The match was played between Sydney FC and Perth Glory, at Netstrata Jubilee Stadium, with Sydney FC emerging victorious 4–2.

This was referee Kate Jacewicz's ninth final out of the first eleven seasons of the W-League. The attendance of 6,127 was a record for W-League grand finals.

== Teams ==
Team	Previous grand final appearances (bold indicates winners)
Sydney FC	5 (**2009 (Dec)**, 2011, **2013**, 2016, 2018)
Perth Glory	2 (2014 (Dec), 2017)

== Route to the final ==
Sydney FC		Round	Perth Glory	
3rd place: Pos / Team / Pld / Pts; 1 / Melbourne Victory / 12 / **24**; 2 / Brisbane Roar / 12 / **20**; **3** / Sydney FC (C) / **12** / **19**; 4 / Perth Glory / 12 / **19**; 5 / Melbourne City / 12 / **19**; Source: A-Leagues (C) Champions		Regular season	4th place: Pos / Team / Pld / Pts; 2 / Brisbane Roar / 12 / **20**; 3 / Sydney FC (C) / 12 / **19**; **4** / Perth Glory / **12** / **19**; 5 / Melbourne City / 12 / **19**; 6 / Adelaide United / 12 / **18**; Source: A-Leagues (C) Champions	
Opponent	Score		Opponent	Score
Brisbane Roar	2–1 (A)	Semi-finals	Melbourne Victory	4–2 (a.e.t.) (A)

Semi-finals
2	Brisbane Roar	1
3	**Sydney FC**	**2**
1	Melbourne Victory	2
4	**Perth Glory** (a.e.t.)	**4**

Grand Final
Sydney FC	**4**
Perth Glory	2

== Match details ==
16 February 2019
16:30 AEDT

Sydney FC	4–2	Perth Glory
Huerta 6'; McCaskill 41', 61'; Logarzo 70'	Report	Kerr 23' (pen.); Mautz 68'

Netstrata Jubilee Stadium, Sydney
Attendance: 6,127
Referee: Kate Jacewicz

**Sydney FC**	**Perth Glory**

GK	1	(United States) Aubrey Bledsoe
DF	22	(United States) Sofia Huerta
DF	5	(Australia) Ally Green
DF	14	(Australia) Alanna Kennedy
DF	4	(Australia) Elizabeth Ralston
MF	10	(United States) Danielle Colaprico (yellow card) 22'
MF	2	(Australia) Teresa Polias (c)
MF	6	(Australia) Chloe Logarzo (substituted off) 82'
FW	11	(United States) Savannah McCaskill (substituted off) 90+2'
FW	19	(Australia) Caitlin Foord
FW	20	(Australia) Princess Ibini (substituted off) 75'
Substitutes:
FW	11	(Australia) Lisa De Vanna (substituted on) 75'
GK	30	(Australia) Trudy Burke
DF	17	(Australia) Angelique Hristodoulou (substituted on) 90+2'
DF	21	(Australia) Amy Harrison (substituted on) 82' (yellow card) 89'
FW	3	(Australia) Shadeene Evans
Manager:
(Australia) Ante Juric

GK	1	(Australia) Eliza Campbell
DF	24	(Australia) Natasha Rigby
DF	13	(Australia) Jamie-Lee Gale
DF	25	(United States) Katie Naughton
DF	3	(Australia) Kim Carroll
MF	5	(Australia) Shannon May (substituted off) 67'
MF	4	(United States) Alyssa Mautz
MF	7	(United States) Nikki Stanton (yellow card) 89'
FW	20	(Australia) Sam Kerr (c)
FW	11	(Australia) Leticia McKenna (substituted off) 75'
FW	9	(United States) Rachel Hill
Substitutes:
GK	21	(Australia) Morgan Aquino
DF	2	(Australia) Sarah Carroll
FW	12	(Australia) Jenna Onions
MF	14	(Australia) Caitlin Doeglas (substituted on) 67'
MF	15	(Australia) Alexia Moreno (substituted on) 75'
Manager:
(Australia) Bobby Despotovski

== Match statistics ==
Stats	Sydney FC	Perth Glory
Ball possession	50.7%	49.3%
Passes	341	345
Passing accuracy	68.0%	60.3%
Corners	3	4
Shots	15	15
On target shots	6	4
Aerial duels won	53.8%	46.2%
Interceptions	11	4
Fouls conceded	7	14
Yellow cards	2	1
Red cards	0	0

== See also ==
- W-League records and statistics
