= List of people from Boise, Idaho =

The following is a list of notable people who were either born in, lived in, are current residents of, or are otherwise closely associated with the city of Boise, Idaho.

== Notable people ==
- Robert Adler, inventor
- William Agee, former business executive
- Joe Albertson, founder of the Albertsons chain of grocery stores
- Kathryn Albertson, philanthropist; wife of Joe Albertson; born in Boise
- Cecil Andrus, Idaho's only four-term governor; secretary of the interior
- James Jesus Angleton, former chief of the CIA counter-intelligence staff
- Steve Appleton, businessman and aviation enthusiast
- Kristin Armstrong, 3x Olympic cycling gold medalist
- Matthew Barney, artist
- Rick Bauer, Major League Baseball player
- Andy Benoit, journalist for Sports Illustrated
- Andrew Blaser (born 1989), skeleton racer
- Denzel Boston (born 2003), NFL wide receiver for the Cleveland Browns
- Phyllis Brooks, actress
- Bill Buckner, former Major League Baseball player
- Maggie Carey, director, writer
- John P. Cassidy, Los Angeles City Council member, 1962–67, born in Boise
- James Charles Castle, deaf artist
- Annetta R. Chipp, temperance leader and prison evangelist
- Frank Church, U.S. senator, chairman of the Senate Foreign Relations Committee
- Randy Davison, actor
- Anthony Doerr, novelist
- Ben Driebergen, winner of Survivor: Heroes vs. Healers vs. Hustlers
- Stephen Fife, Major League Baseball pitcher
- Russ Fulcher, U.S. representative for Idaho
- John M. Haines, mayor and governor
- Mark Gregory Hambley, ambassador
- Gene Harris, jazz musician
- Steve Harwell, singer and founder of Smash Mouth
- Michael Hoffman, film director
- Jack Hoxie, rodeo cowboy, Hollywood silent movie cowboy actor
- Sofia Huerta, soccer player for the United States
- Ernie Hughes, NFL player
- Morgan James, singer, songwriter, and actress
- Eilen Jewell, singer-songwriter and band leader
- Joëlle Jones, comic book artist and writer
- Scott Jorgensen, mixed martial artist
- Matteo Jorgenson, professional cyclist
- Dirk Kempthorne, mayor, governor, senator, and secretary of the interior
- Mert Lawwill, professional motorcycle racer, 1969 AMA Grand National Champion
- Robin Long, United States Army soldier who deserted to Canada due to his opposition to the Iraq War
- David Lynch, film director, spent much of his childhood in Boise
- Doug Martsch, musician, of Boise indie-rock band Built To Spill
- Jo Morse, bridge player
- Brett Nelson, musician and songwriter
- Maureen O'Hara, actress
- Reginald Owen, character actor
- Thom Pace, musician and songwriter
- Aaron Paul, actor, Breaking Bad
- William Petersen, actor
- Jeret Peterson, silver medalist, 2010 Winter Olympics, freestyle skiing
- Jake Plummer, football quarterback
- Bridget Powers, actress
- Trevor Powers, musician
- Elizabeth Prelogar, 48th Solicitor General of the United States
- Bruce Reed, political advisor
- Paul Revere, musician
- Jim Risch, U.S. senator
- Emily Sams, soccer player
- Brian Scott, auto racer
- Johnny Sequoyah, child actress, best known for starring in Believe, born in Boise
- Jeremy Shada, voice actor (Adventure Time)
- Sandy Shellworth, alpine skier
- Brandi Sherwood, Miss Teen USA 1989 and Miss USA 1997
- Sydney Shoemaker, philosopher
- Frank Shrontz, businessman
- J. R. Simplot, businessman
- Robert Smylie, governor
- Sally Snodgrass, Idaho state senator
- Michael J. Squier, U.S. Army brigadier general and deputy director of the Army National Guard
- Gary Stevens, Hall of Fame jockey and actor
- Curtis Stigers, musician and songwriter
- Sara Studebaker-Hall, Olympic biathlete
- Kristine Sutherland, television actress
- Billy Uhl, five-time gold medal-winning motorcycle enduro competitor; founder of the Idaho State Parks Trail Ranger Program advocating for responsible off-road vehicle usage
- Benjamin Victor, world-renowned sculptor and professor of Practice and Artist in Residence at Boise State University
- Wayne Walker, football linebacker and broadcaster
- Dick Wesson, television and movie trailer announcer
- Torrie Wilson, former WWE professional wrestler
