= Kokona Iwasaki =

Japanese association football player

Kokona Iwasaki 岩﨑心南
Personal information
- Date of birth: 8 October 2002 (age 24)
- Place of birth: Saitama Prefecture, Japan
- Height: 1.61 m (5 ft 3 in)
- Position: Midfielder

Team information
- Current team: Feyenoord
- Number: 7

Senior career*
Years	Team	Apps	(Gls)
2019–2025	Tokyo Verdy Beleza	59	(3)
2025–	Feyenoord	16	(2)

International career^{‡}
2022	Japan U-20	5	(0)
- * Club domestic league appearances and goals as of 04:30, 27 March 2026 (UTC) ‡ National team caps and goals as of 04:30, 27 March 2026 (UTC)

Kokona Iwasaki (岩﨑心南, Iwasaki Kokona; born 8 October 2002) is a Japanese professional footballer who plays as a midfielder for Vrouwen Eredivisie club Feyenoord.

== Club career ==
Iwasaki made her WE League debut on 25 September 2021.

== Honours ==
Tokyo Verdy Beleza

- AFC Women's Club Championship: 2019
