= Savannah McCaskill =

American soccer player (born 1996)

- McCaskill with Gotham FC in 2026

Personal information
- Full name: Savannah Elizabeth McCaskill
- Date of birth: July 31, 1996 (age 30)
- Place of birth: Chapin, South Carolina, United States
- Height: 5 ft 4 in (1.63 m)
- Position: Midfielder

Team information
- Current team: Gotham FC
- Number: 13

College career
| Years | Team | Apps | (Gls) |
| 2014–2017 | South Carolina Gamecocks | 91 | (40) |

Senior career*
| Years | Team | Apps | (Gls) |
| 2018–2019 | Sky Blue FC | 26 | (3) |
| 2018–2019 | → Sydney FC (loan) | 14 | (5) |
| 2019–2020 | Chicago Red Stars | 21 | (2) |
| 2021 | Racing Louisville FC | 23 | (2) |
| 2022–2023 | Angel City FC | 44 | (11) |
| 2024–2025 | San Diego Wave | 41 | (2) |
| 2026– | Gotham FC | 28 | (0) |

International career^{‡}
| 2017–2019 | United States U-23 | 6 | (1) |
| 2018– | United States | 6 | (0) |
- * Club domestic league appearances and goals as of November 1, 2026 ‡ National team caps and goals as of July 5, 2018

Savannah Elizabeth McCaskill (born July 31, 1996) is an American professional soccer player who plays as a midfielder for Gotham FC of the National Women's Soccer League (NWSL). She played college soccer for the South Carolina Gamecocks and was selected second overall in the 2018 NWSL College Draft by the Boston Breakers.

McCaskill has spent the majority of her career in the NWSL, including spells with Sky Blue FC, the Chicago Red Stars, Racing Louisville, Angel City, and the San Diego Wave. She received NWSL Second XI honors with Angel City in 2023. She has six caps for the United States national team, all earned in 2018.

== Early life ==
McCaskill was born on July 31, 1996.

She was raised in Sumter, South Carolina, before moving to Chapin when she was in seventh grade. Her mother, Tina, was the principal of a local elementary school (and later director of the district's elementary schools), while her father, Greg, owned a business.

McCaskill was twice-named to the All-State team and was the team's highest-scoring player in 2012 with 33 goals. As a senior, she was ranked by Top Drawer Soccer in the top 100 players and top 20 midfielders nationwide.

McCaskill played club soccer for CESA 95 in the Elite Clubs National League (ECNL) and captained the team. She played for the South Carolina Olympic Development Program (ODP) team from 2008 to 2012 and the regional ODP team from 2010 to 2013.

== College career ==
McCaskill attended the University of South Carolina where she played for the Gamecocks from 2014 to 2017.

As a freshman, she started in all 25 matches and tied for the most points (15) on the team playing as a forward (though initially recruited as a defender). She was named as Freshman of the Year by the Southeastern Conference (SEC) and was named to the conference's second-team and all-freshman teams.

As a sophomore starting in all 25 games, McCaskill led the team in points and goals (29 and 10 respectively) while her nine assists ranked second. She ranked in the top five in the SEC for points and assists per game as well as total assists. She was named to the All-SEC First Team, NSCAA All-South Region First Team and was voted the team's Offensive Player of the Year.

In 2016, McCaskill's 45 points and 17 goals set new school records for a single season. Her ten game-winning goals ranked second in Division 1 and first in the SEC. She was named the SEC's Offensive Player of the Week in early September. She scored a hat-trick against Tulsa in August, which marked the first time one had been scored by a player on the team since 2010.

== Club career ==
=== Sky Blue FC, 2018–19 ===
McCaskill was selected by the Boston Breakers as the number two overall pick at the 2018 NWSL College Draft but, after the team folded due to failed buyout negotiations in late January, McCaskill was selected by Sky Blue FC with the second pick in the 2018 NWSL Dispersal Draft. She scored her first career goal on April 21 against the Chicago Red Stars. McCaskill was a finalist for 2018 NWSL Rookie of the Year, alongside Andi Sullivan and Imani Dorsey.

==== Loan to Sydney FC ====
McCaskill signed with Sydney FC for the 2018-19 W-League season, joining fellow Americans Sofia Huerta, Danielle Colaprico and Aubrey Bledsoe. She scored her first goal for Sydney in a 5–2 win over Adelaide United in December 2018, before scoring two goals (a brace) the following month in a 3–1 win over the Newcastle Jets. Sydney advanced to the 2019 W-League Grand Final, where they won 4–2. McCaskill scored two of their four goals and recorded a further assist; she was named Player of the Match.

=== Chicago Red Stars, 2019–2021 ===
In June 2019, McCaskill was traded to the Chicago Red Stars (now known as Chicago Stars FC) in exchange for a first and second round draft pick at the 2020 NWSL College Draft. McCaskill made her club debut on June 23 against Reign FC.

=== Racing Louisville, 2021 ===
Before the 2021 NWSL season, Chicago traded the rights of McCaskill and Yuki Nagasato, as well as an extra international roster slot for the 2021 and 2022 seasons, and the team's first round pick in the 2021 NWSL Draft to expansion team Racing Louisville FC. McCaskill made her debut for Racing on April 10, the team's inaugural game. She scored her debut club goal against former team, Chicago Red Stars, in a 3–0 win for Racing.

=== Angel City FC, 2021–23 ===
In December 2021, McCaskill was traded to Angel City FC in exchange for the No. 6 pick in the 2022 NWSL Draft and $25,000 in allocation money. Louisville later traded that pick to North Carolina Courage for Jessica McDonald.

On July 29, McCaskill scored both of Angel City's goals in a 2–1 win against the Portland Thorns in the Challenge Cup group stage. She assisted Alyssa Thompson and scored the stoppage-time winner in a 2–1 win against the Houston Dash on October 8. She was named NWSL Player of the Month two times and selected to the NWSL Second XI at the end of the year.

=== San Diego Wave, 2023–2025 ===
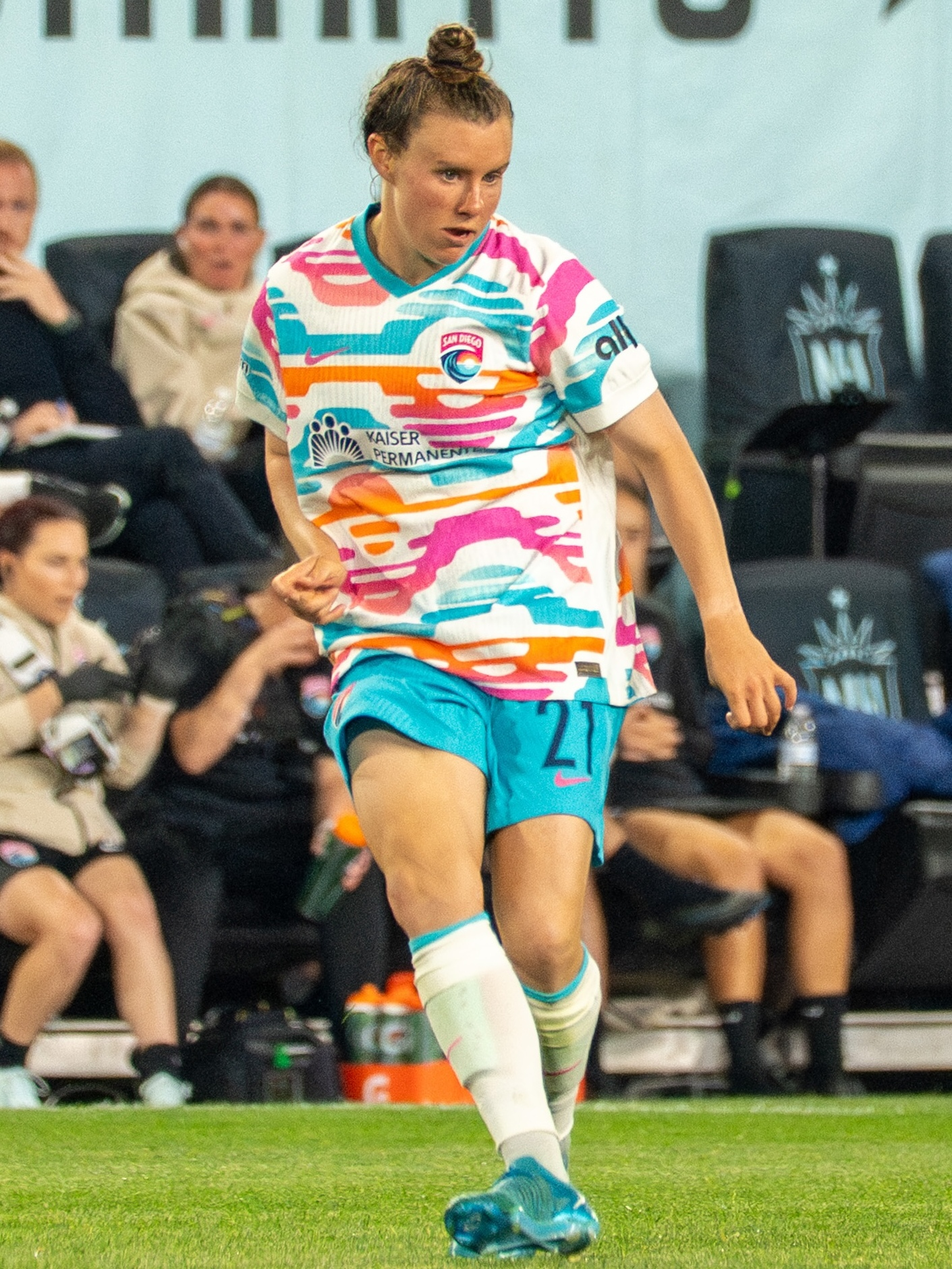
McCaskill with the San Diego Wave in 2025

With the completion of the 2023 NWSL season, McCaskill became a free agent. On December 20, 2023, San Diego Wave FC announced the signing of McCaskill to a three-year contract. She made her debut with the Wave on March 15, 2024, in an NWSL Challenge Cup game against Gotham. McCaskill assisted Alex Morgan's game-winning goal, serving up a corner kick in the 88th minute of the match. On the last game of the Wave's 2024 season, McCaskill scored her debut club goal in a 3–1 win against Racing Louisville FC.

During the 2025 season, McCaskill's second year at San Diego, she found herself playing in a deeper role alongside new acquisition Kenza Dali. She helped the Wave reach a sixth-place finish in the league and qualify for the playoffs for the third time in club history. However, due to an injury, McCaskill was not able to play at the tail end of the season and watched on from the sidelines as the Wave were beaten in the quarterfinals by the Portland Thorns.

=== Gotham FC, 2026– ===
In January 2026, it was announced that McCaskill had been traded from San Diego to Gotham FC in exchange for $175,000 in intraleague transfer funds; she had previously played for Gotham in the team's Sky Blue FC era. On February 1, 2026, she scored once to help Gotham win the FIFA Women's Champions Cup third place match over AS FAR, her first goal in her second stint with the club.

== International career ==
=== Under-23 ===
McCaskill represented the United States on the under-23 national team and was nominated for U.S. Soccer's 2017 Young Female Athlete of the Year award.

On August 23, 2018, she was named to the United States U-23 team for the 2018 Nordic tournament.

=== Senior ===
McCaskill made her debut for the senior national team on January 21, 2018, during an international friendly against Denmark. She was named to the U.S. roster for the 2018 SheBelieves Cup. She appeared in all three games as the United States won the tournament for the second time.

McCaskill was named to the provisional U.S. Roster for the 2018 CONCACAF Women's Championship but she was not named to the final 20-player squad.

== Personal life ==
In July 2023, McCaskill announced her engagement to partner Logan. The pair married on December 6, 2025.

== Career statistics ==
=== Club ===
As of June 27, 2026

Appearances and goals by club, season and competition
| Club | Season | League | | | Cup (Note: Includes the NWSL Challenge Cup) | | Playoffs (Note: Includes NWSL Playoffs and A-League Finals Series) | | Continental (Note: Includes CONCACAF W Champions Cup) | | Other | | Total | |
| Club | Season | Division | Apps | Goals | Apps | Goals | Apps | Goals | Apps | Goals | Apps | Goals | Apps | Goals |
|---|---|---|---|---|---|---|---|---|---|---|---|---|---|---|
| Sky Blue FC | 2018 | NWSL | 20 | 3 | — | | — | | — | | — | | 20 | 3 |
| Sky Blue FC | 2019 | NWSL | 6 | 0 | — | | — | | — | | — | | 6 | 0 |
| Sky Blue FC | Total | | 26 | 3 | — | | — | | — | | — | | 26 | 3 |
| Sydney FC (loan) | 2018–19 | W-League | 12 | 3 | — | | 2 | 2 | — | | — | | 14 | 5 |
| Chicago Red Stars | 2019 | NWSL | 18 | 1 | — | | 2 | 0 | — | | — | | 20 | 1 |
| Chicago Red Stars | 2020 | NWSL | — (Note: The 2020 NWSL regular season and playoffs were canceled due to the COVID-19 pandemic.) | | 7 | 1 | — | | — | | 3 (Note: Includes NWSL Fall Series) | 1 | 10 | 2 |
| Chicago Red Stars | Total | | 18 | 1 | 7 | 1 | 2 | 0 | — | | 3 | 1 | 30 | 3 |
| Racing Louisville FC | 2021 | NWSL | 23 | 2 | 4 | 0 | — | | — | | — | | 27 | 2 |
| Angel City FC | 2022 | NWSL | 21 | 7 | 5 | 1 | — | | — | | — | | 26 | 8 |
| Angel City FC | 2023 | NWSL | 23 | 4 | 5 | 2 | 1 | 0 | — | | — | | 29 | 6 |
| Angel City FC | Total | | 44 | 11 | 10 | 3 | 1 | 0 | — | | — | | 55 | 14 |
| San Diego Wave FC | 2024 | NWSL | 20 | 1 | 1 | 0 | — | | 1 | 0 | 3 (Note: Includes NWSL x Liga MX Femenil Summer Cup) | 0 | 25 | 1 |
| San Diego Wave FC | 2025 | NWSL | 21 | 1 | — | | 0 | 0 | — | | — | | 21 | 1 |
| San Diego Wave FC | Total | | 41 | 2 | 1 | 0 | 0 | 0 | 1 | 0 | 3 | 0 | 46 | 2 |
| Gotham FC | 2026 | NWSL | 11 | 0 | 1 | 0 | — | | 4 | 1 | — | | 16 | 1 |
| Career total | | | 175 | 22 | 23 | 4 | 5 | 2 | 5 | 1 | 6 | 1 | 214 | 30 |

== Honors ==
Sydney FC

- W-League Championship: 2018–19

San Diego Wave

- NWSL Challenge Cup: 2024

Gotham FC

- NWSL Shield: 2026
- NWSL Challenge Cup: 2026

United States

- SheBelieves Cup: 2018

Individual

- NWSL Second XI: 2023
- NWSL Player of the Month: July 2023, October 2023
