= Sydney Miramontez =

American soccer player

Personal information
- Full name: Sydney Michelle Miramontez
- Date of birth: October 11, 1994 (age 32)
- Place of birth: Lenexa, Kansas, United States
- Height: 5 ft 7 in (1.70 m)
- Position: Defender

College career
Years	Team	Apps	(Gls)
2013–2016	Nebraska Cornhuskers	75	(6)

Senior career*
Years	Team	Apps	(Gls)
2017	GSI Pride	3	(0)
2017	FC Kansas City	5	(0)
2018–2019	Utah Royals	14	(0)
2018–2019	→ Western Sydney Wanderers (loan)	11	(0)
2021	Kansas City	1	(0)

International career
2017	United States U23		
- * Club domestic league appearances and goals as of 13 September 2019

Sydney Michelle Miramontez (born October 11, 1994) is an American professional soccer player who plays as a defender.

She previously played for Utah Royals FC and FC Kansas City in the NWSL, the Western Sydney Wanderers in the Australian W-League, the University of Nebraska–Lincoln, and the GSI Pride of the Women's Premier Soccer League (WPSL).

== Early life ==
Miramontez grew up in Lenexa, Kansas and first played youth soccer for Andy Barney and the Kansas City Legends. At age 12 Sydney joined the KCFC Heat and played for Gags Pritchard then Blue Valley under FC Kansas City head coach Vlatko Andonovski. With the KCFC Heat she won three Kansas State Cup titles. Miramontez attended Shawnee Mission West High School, where she scored 52 goals and 52 assists in four years, and still holds the school record for career goals, career assists and single-season assists.

== College career ==
Miramontez attended the University of Nebraska–Lincoln where she played for the Cornhuskers from 2013 to 2016. She started 48 of 75 appearances and scored six goals and 14 assists. As a senior, she led the Cornhuskers in assists and earned second-team All-Big Ten accolades. She also achieved third-team NSCAA All-Great Lakes Region and Big Ten All-Tournament Team status.

== Club career ==
=== FC Kansas City, 2017 ===
On August 2, 2017, Miramontez was signed by FC Kansas City after a successful spell training and playing with the GSI Pride. She made her debut in a 2–2 draw at the Boston Breakers on August 4.

=== Utah Royals FC, 2018–2019 ===
After FC Kansas City ceased operations following the 2017 season, Miramontez was officially added to the roster of the Utah Royals FC on February 8, 2018.

On February 19, 2020 Miramontez announced her retirement from professional soccer. She made 14 appearances with Utah over her two seasons with the club.

=== Kansas City NWSL, 2021 ===
On December 23, 2020 Miramontez came out of retirement after signing a one-year contract with Kansas City NWSL.
