= Chloe Berryhill =

Australian soccer player

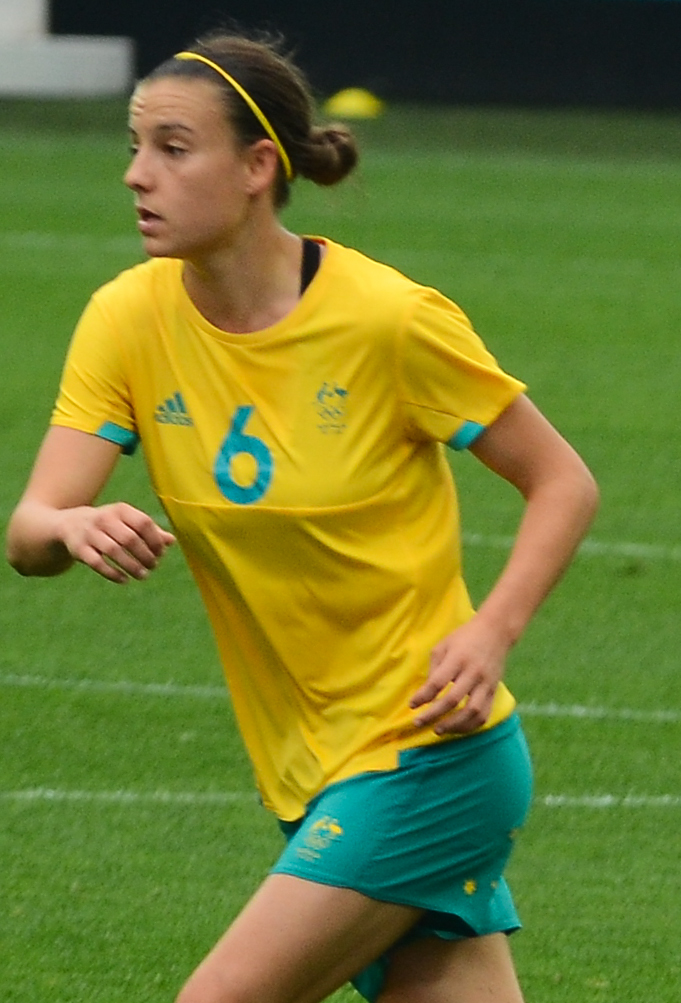
- Berryhill in 2016

Personal information
- Birth name: Chloe Logarzo
- Date of birth: 22 December 1994 (age 31)
- Place of birth: Sydney, Australia
- Height: 1.65 m (5 ft 5 in)
- Position: Midfielder

Senior career*
| Years | Team | Apps | (Gls) |
| 2011–2015 | Sydney FC | 48 | (11) |
| 2014 | Colorado Pride | 10 | (8) |
| 2015–2016 | Newcastle Jets | 10 | (1) |
| 2016 | North Shore Mariners | 6 | (2) |
| 2016 | Eskilstuna United | 10 | (2) |
| 2017 | Avaldsnes | 13 | (0) |
| 2018 | Blacktown Spartans FC | 6 | (2) |
| 2017–2020 | Sydney FC | 34 | (8) |
| 2019 | → Washington Spirit (loan) | 15 | (1) |
| 2020–2021 | Bristol City | 9 | (3) |
| 2021–2023 | Kansas City Current | 6 | (0) |
| 2022–2023 | → Western United (loan) | 6 | (3) |
| 2023–2025 | Western United | 21 | (12) |
| 2025 | Como 1907 | 1+ | (0) |
| 2025–2026 | Western Sydney Wanderers | 6 | (1) |

International career^{‡}
- Australia U20
| 2013–2026 | Australia | 59 | (8) |
- * Club domestic league appearances and goals as of 12 December 2025 ‡ National team caps and goals as of 10 July 2025

Chloe Logarzo-Berryhill (née Logarzo /ləˈɡɑːrzoʊ/ lə-GAR-zoh, Italian: [loˈɡardzo]; 22 December 1994) is an Australian former soccer player who played as a midfielder. She made 59 appearances for the Australia national team. At club level, Berryhill played a total of 136 W-League (later renamed A-League Women) games for Sydney FC, Newcastle Jets, Western United and Western Sydney Wanderers. She retired from soccer in January 2026 after an anterior cruciate ligament injury.

== Early life ==
Berryhill was born in Sydney. Her family is Italian on her father's side and Scottish on her mother's side. She started playing football aged five for Redbacks FC (formerly Carlingford Redbacks), but did not play at an elite level until some years later, having been rejected on some occasions for a lack of size.

== Club career ==
=== Sydney FC, 2011–2015 ===
Berryhill began her career with Sydney FC during the 2011–12 W-League season, and made her debut in a 4–1 victory over Newcastle Jets on 12 November 2011. Her second, and final, appearance of the season came in a 3–0 victory over Perth Glory on 7 January 2012.

Berryhill remained with Sydney FC for the 2012–13 season. She scored her first goal for the club against Perth Glory on 17 November 2012, but was unable to prevent Sydney FC from losing 3–1. She was on the scoresheet once more in the following game, scoring twice in a 4–0 victory over Adelaide United on 24 November 2012. Berryhill played a total of twelve league games over the course of the season, scoring thrice, as Sydney FC won the W-League title for the second time.

=== Colorado Pride, 2014 ===
Berryhill joined fellow Australian and Colorado Pride W-League Head Coach Daniel Clitnovici in the 2014 USL W-League. Berryhill led Colorado Pride to a historic play-off berth in their inaugural season with 8 goals and 7 assists in 10 games as well as being named the 2014 USL W-League Rookie of the year. An award handed out to the player in their 1st season playing in the W-League.

Berryhill was retained by Sydney FC for the 2013–14 season.

=== Newcastle Jets, 2015–2017 ===
Berryhill joined Newcastle Jets for the 2015–16 season. She intended to return for 2016–17, refusing bigger offers from elsewhere, but arrived carrying an ankle injury sustained during her spell in Sweden with Eskilstuna United. In October 2017, it was announced that Berryhill would not be returning to Newcastle Jets.

=== Eskilstuna United, 2016 ===
In June 2016, Berryhill joined Swedish Damallsvenskan side Eskilstuna United. She made her debut on 28 August 2016 playing the whole match in a 2–1 victory over Vittsjö. She scored her first goal in a 3–1 victory over Kopparbergs/Göteborg on 25 September 2016. Berryhill made 10 league appearances scoring two goals and left the club following their UEFA Women's Champions League defeat by VfL Wolfsburg.

=== Avaldsnes, 2017 ===
In February 2017, Berryhill joined Norwegian Toppserien side Avaldsnes and made 16 appearances for the club. Berryhill left the club early when she was benched for the Round of 32 Champions League game against FC Barcelona Femení.

=== Sydney FC, 2017–2020 ===
In October 2017, Berryhill returned to Sydney FC. In the 2017–18 season Berryhill appeared in 11 games and scored 3 goals. She re-signed with Sydney for the 2018-19 W-League season and appeared in all 14 games for the team Berryhill scored Sydney's fourth goal in the 2019 W-League Grand Final, helping Sydney to a 4–2 victory over Perth, this was Berryhill's second W-League Championship.

==== Offseason with Blacktown Spartans FC, 2018 ====
Berryhill signed with Blacktown Spartans FC in the NPL NSW for the 2018 season.

==== Loan to Washington Spirit, 2019 ====
In February 2019, the Washington Spirit announced that Berryhill would be joining the team on loan for the 2019 NWSL season. At the end of the season, Berryhill was made available on the NWSL Re-Entry Wire and her rights selected by the Orlando Pride. The transaction was later voided after the league realized Berryhill should not have been made available for selection and allowed to go through the re-entry process.

=== Bristol City, 2020–2021 ===
On 23 January 2020, Berryhill signed a one-and-a-half-year contract with English FA WSL club Bristol City. Berryhill scored her first FA WSL goal from the penalty spot in a 2–2 draw with Tottenham Hotspur on November 14.

=== Kansas City, 2021–2023 ===
Berryhill was transferred from Bristol City to the NWSL's Kansas City Current in January 2021. In March, after a few months on loan at Western United in Australia, Berryhill was waived by Kansas City Current.

=== Western United, 2022–2025 ===
In September 2022, it was announced Berryhill will be loaned to A-League Women's newest expansion club Western United for the 2022–23 A-League Women season. She joined them after the NWSL season, in time for the A-League pre-season. In February 2023, Berryhill's loan ended after serving as a vice-captain of the club and playing a major role in their success. The following month, after being released by Kansas City Current, Berryhill returned to Western United, signing a permanent deal until the end of the 2023–24 A-League Women season. Berryhill departed Western United in September 2025 to take up an opportunity overseas.

At the end of the 2024–25 season, Berryhill had played a total of 130 A-League Women/W-League matches for Sydney (75) from 2011–2015 and 2017–2020, Newcastle Jets (10) from 2015–2017 and Western United (45) from 2022–2025. All together she provided 32 goals for those clubs.

=== Como 1907, 2025 ===
On 9 September 2025, Italian side Como 1907 announced the signing of Berryhill.

=== Western Sydney Wanderers, 2025–2026 ===
Berryhill returned to the A-League Women for the 2025–26 season, which she confirmed would be her last before retirement, signing for Western Sydney Wanderers (the arch-rivals of her former club Sydney FC). During a 1–1 home draw with Brisbane Roar on 16 January 2026, she again tore her anterior cruciate ligament (ACL), which ended her season. A week later, Berryhill officially announced her retirement from soccer.

== International career ==
Berryhill was the captain of the Australian under-20 side that finished runner-up at the 2013 AFF Women's Championship, drawing praise for her performance in the final. She retained her place in the squad for the AFC U-19 Women's Championship. She made her full international debut for Australia on 24 November 2013, in a 2–0 victory over China.

Berryhill was dropped from the Matildas squad for the 2015 FIFA Women's World Cup, but was included in the 2016 Rio Olympics squad. She appeared in all four of Australia's matches in Rio. Berryhill was one of Australia's penalty takers as their quarter-final match against Brazil went to penalties. She scored her penalty, but the Matildas were defeated 7–6.

Berryhill won the 2017 Tournament of Nations with Australia, where they defeated the United States for the first time. She participated at her first Asian Cup in 2018, where she appeared in all 5 matches, having scored a goal in the group stage match against Vietnam.

Berryhill scored against Brazil at the 2019 FIFA Women's World Cup.

Berryhill was selected for the 2020 Tokyo Olympics squad. The Matildas advanced to the quarter-finals with a victory and a draw in the group stage. In the quarter-finals, they defeated Great Britain 4–3 after extra time. However, they lost 1–0 to Sweden in the semi-finals and 4–3 to the US in the bronze medal match, going home empty-handed. Full details.

== Personal life ==
Berryhill is openly lesbian. She has spoken publicly about her sexuality. On coming out in the media Berryhill said, "There are still a few people scared that it is going to tarnish their image but for me, if it was going to tarnish my image then it's not the image I want because I'm not telling the truth."

In February 2020, Berryhill discussed her coming out story on a podcast, as well as playing overseas, and her relationship with American soccer player, McKenzie Berryhill, her former Washington Spirit teammate. McKenzie, who had retired, joined Berryhill in the UK during COVID-19 quarantine in 2020. The pair were engaged in August 2021 and married on 13 November 2024 in the Phi Phi Islands, in the Phuket province of Thailand. Berryhill began using her married name, as Logarzo-Berryhill, from April 2025.

She trained as an apprentice landscaper before pursuing soccer full-time.

Berryhill is an occasional panellist on Paramount+ and Network 10's football coverage in Australia. She also was part of the Optus Sport punditry team for the 2023 FIFA Women's World Cup. After her retirement from professional soccer she joined Network 10/Paramount+'s coverage of the 2026 AFC Women's Asian Cup, which was held in Australia during March.

In 2024, Berryhill competed on the Amazing Race Australia celebrity edition alongside her Matalida's teammate Emily Gielnik, placing 6th.

== Career statistics ==
=== Club ===
As of July 25, 2020

| Club | Season | League | | | National Cup (Note: Includes Svenska Cup, Norwegian Cup and FA Cup) | | League Cup (Note: Includes League Cup) | | Continental Cup (Note: Includes UEFA Women's Champions League) | | Total | |
| Club | Season | Division | Apps | Goals | Apps | Goals | Apps | Goals | Apps | Goals | Apps | Goals |
|---|---|---|---|---|---|---|---|---|---|---|---|---|
| Sydney FC | 2011–12 | W-League | 2 | 0 | — | | — | | — | | 2 | 0 |
| Sydney FC | 2012–13 | W-League | 12 | 3 | — | | — | | — | | 12 | 3 |
| Sydney FC | 2013–14 | W-League | 13 | 1 | — | | — | | — | | 13 | 1 |
| Sydney FC | 2014–15 | W-League | 13 | 0 | — | | — | | — | | 13 | 0 |
| Sydney FC | Total | | 40 | 4 | 0 | 0 | 0 | 0 | 0 | 0 | 40 | 4 |
| Colorado Pride | 2014 | USL W-League | 10 | 8 | — | | — | | — | | 10 | 8 |
| Newcastle Jets | 2015—16 | W-League | 10 | 1 | — | | — | | — | | 10 | 1 |
| Eskilstuna United DFF | 2016 | Damallsvenskan | 9 | 2 | 1 | 0 | — | | 2 | 0 | 12 | 3 |
| Avaldsnes | 2017 | Toppserien | 13 | 0 | 0 | 0 | — | | 3 | 1 | 16 | 1 |
| Sydney FC | 2017–18 | W-League | 11 | 3 | — | | — | | — | | 11 | 3 |
| Sydney FC | 2018–19 | W-League | 14 | 4 | — | | — | | — | | 14 | 4 |
| Sydney FC | 2019–20 | W-League | 9 | 1 | — | | — | | — | | 9 | 1 |
| Sydney FC | Total | | 34 | 8 | 0 | 0 | 0 | 0 | 0 | 0 | 34 | 8 |
| Washington Spirit | 2019 | NWSL | 15 | 1 | — | | — | | — | | 15 | 1 |
| Bristol City | 2019–20 | FA WSL | 1 | 0 | 0 | 0 | 0 | 0 | — | | 1 | 0 |
| Bristol City | 2020–21 | FA WSL | 6 | 1 | 0 | 0 | 2 | 3 | | | 7 | 3 |
| Career total | | | 138 | 25 | 1 | 0 | 2 | 3 | 5 | 1 | 145 | 29 |

=== International goals ===
As of match played 11 March 2020 Australia score listed first, score column indicates score after each Berryhill goal.

| Goal | Date | Location | Opponent | Score | Result | Competition |
|---|---|---|---|---|---|---|
| 1 | 26 November 2017 | Kardinia Park, Geelong, Australia | China | 5–1 | 5–1 | Friendly |
| 2 | 28 February 2018 | Albufeira Municipal Stadium, Albufeira, Portugal | Norway | 2–1 | 4–3 | 2018 Algarve Cup |
| 3 | 5 March 2018 | Albufeira Municipal Stadium, Albufeira, Portugal | China | 1–0 | 2–0 | 2018 Algarve Cup |
| 4 | 26 March 2018 | Perth Oval, Perth, Australia | Thailand | 3–0 | 5–0 | Friendly |
| 5 | 10 April 2018 | Amman International Stadium, Amman, Jordan | Vietnam | 3–0 | 8–0 | 2018 AFC Women's Asian Cup |
| 6 | 29 July 2018 | Pratt & Whitney Stadium, Connecticut, United States | United States | 1–0 | 1–1 | 2018 Tournament of Nations |
| 7 | 13 June 2019 | Stade de la Mosson, Montpellier, France | Brazil | 2–2 | 3–2 | 2019 FIFA Women's World Cup |
| 8 | 6 March 2020 | McDonald Jones Stadium, Newcastle, Australia | Vietnam | 2–0 | 5–0 | 2020 AFC Women's Olympic Qualifying Tournament |

== Honours ==
=== Club ===
Sydney FC

- W-League Championship: 2012–13, 2018–19

=== International ===
- AFC Olympic Qualifying Tournament: 2016
- Tournament of Nations: 2017

=== Individual ===
- W-League Rookie of the Year: 2014

== See also ==
- Women's association football in Australia
