= Adriana Konjarski =

Australian football (soccer) player

Personal information
- Full name: Adriana Konjarski
- Birth name: Adriana Jones
- Date of birth: 11 October 1995 (age 31)
- Place of birth: Australia
- Position: Striker

Senior career*
Years	Team	Apps	(Gls)
2013–2014	Newcastle Jets	6	(0)
2015–2016	Newcastle Jets	8	(1)
2016–2018	Adelaide United	20	(9)
2018–2019	Melbourne City	9	(1)
2019	South Melbourne	8	(8)
2022	Warners Bay	15	(33)
2022–2023	Newcastle Jets	9	(1)
2023–2024	Broadmeadow Magic		
- * Club domestic league appearances and goals as of 24 July 2022

Adriana Konjarski (née Jones, born 11 October 1995) is a retired Australian women's association football player who played for Newcastle Jets, Adelaide United, and Melbourne City in the A-League Women as well as for South Melbourne, Warners Bay, and Broadmeadow Magic in the National Premier Leagues Women's.

== Personal life ==
Jones is the daughter of former NSL player and former Newcastle Jets head coach Mark Jones.

== Club career ==
=== Newcastle Jets ===
Jones signed for Newcastle Jets in 2013. After a season off, Jones re-joined Newcastle Jets in October 2015.

=== Adelaide United ===
Jones joined Adelaide United ahead of the 2016–17 season. Jones went on to score nine goals during her first season for Adelaide. Jones also completed a hat trick during the 12th round clash against Western Sydney Wanderers.

=== Zhuhai Suoka Guangdong Football Club ===
Jones would go onto spending some time at the Chinese outfit before returning to Adelaide for the 2017–18 season. She would go on to score 13 times while playing in China.

=== Melbourne City ===
Jones would go on to join her third W-League side for the 2018–19 season for Melbourne City.

=== South Melbourne ===
For the 2019 WNPL season, Jones signed for the former NSL side, South Melbourne. Debuting against Bulleen Lions, Jones would go on to score for her latest club the following game very early on against Senior NTC.

=== Return to Newcastle Jets ===
In October 2022, following a break-out season in the second tier with Warners Bay, Konjarski returned to the professional level, returning to her first club, Newcastle Jets.

=== Broadmeadow Magic ===
In February 2023, Konjarski returned to the National Premier Leagues Women's, joining Broadmeadow Magic. After leading the goalscoring with 35 goals including a grand final stoppage time winner, Konjarski announced her retirement in March 2024.
