= Angelique Hristodoulou =

Australian soccer player

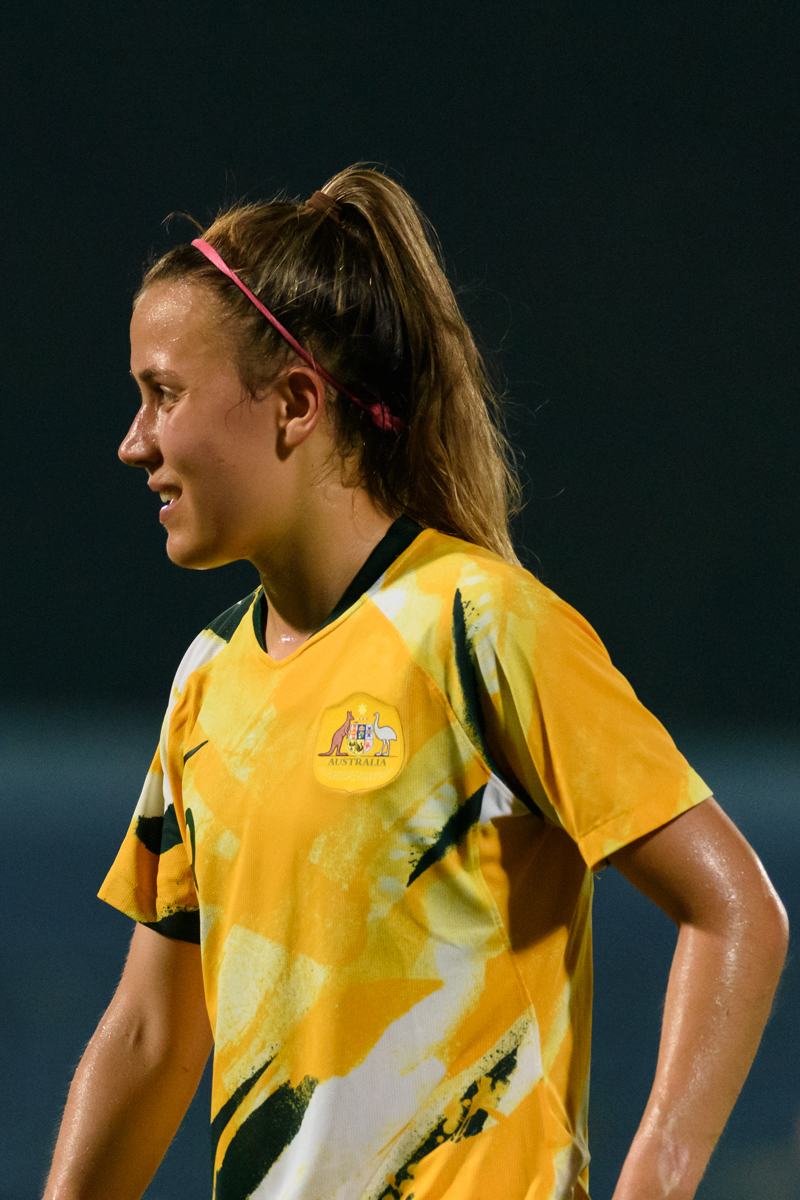

Personal information
- Date of birth: 17 September 2001 (age 25)
- Place of birth: Kogarah, Australia
- Height: 1.65 m (5 ft 5 in)
- Position: Midfielder

Team information
- Current team: Western Sydney Wanderers
- Number: 4

Senior career*
Years	Team	Apps	(Gls)
2016–2017	Western Sydney Wanderers	8	(0)
2017–2022	Sydney FC	40	(0)
2022	Sydney Olympic	21	(1)
2022–	Western Sydney Wanderers	10	(0)

International career^{‡}
2017–	Australia U-17	6	(1)
2018–	Australia U-20	4	(0)
- * Club domestic league appearances and goals as of 7 December 2023 ‡ National team caps and goals as of 1 May 2019

Angelique Hristodoulou (born 17 September 2001) is a professional Australian soccer player who currently plays for Western Sydney Wanderers in the A-League Women. She previously played for Sydney FC and has represented Australia with the under-17 and under-20 national teams.

== Club career ==
=== Western Sydney Wanderers, 2016–2017 ===
On 4 November 2016, Hristodoulou joined the Western Sydney Wanderers at the age of 15, making eight appearances for the club.

=== Sydney FC, 2017–2022 ===
Hristodoulou signed with Sydney FC for the 2017–18 W-League season. She made her debut during the team's 3–2 win over previous-season champions Melbourne City FC.

=== Western Sydney Wanderers, 2022– ===
In October 2022, Hristodoulou returned to Western Sydney Wanderers, signing a two-year contract.

== International career ==
=== Australia U-17 ===
Hristodoulou captained the Australia's under-17 national team squad at the 2017 AFC U-16 Women's Championship. She made six appearances and scored one goal at this tournament.

== Personal life ==
Hristodoulou's father, Eric Hristodoulou, played for Sydney Olympic in the former National Soccer League.

== Honours ==
=== Club ===
- W-League Championship: 2018–19
- W-League Premiership: 2020–21, 2022–22`

=== Individual ===
- Sydney FC Women's U-20 Player of the Year: 2019–20
