= 2018–19 W-League =

Eleventh season of the top women's football (soccer) league in Australia

W-League
- Season: 2018–19
- Champions: Sydney FC (3rd title)
- Premiers: Melbourne Victory (1st title)
- AFC Club Championship: Melbourne Victory
- Matches: 57
- Goals: 189 (3.32 per match)
- Top goalscorer: Sam Kerr (13 goals)
- Biggest home win: Sydney FC 5–1 Brisbane Roar (9 December 2018)
- Biggest away win: Western Sydney Wanderers 1–5 Perth Glory (24 January 2019)
- Highest scoring: Canberra United 4–4 Perth Glory (4 November 2018)
- Highest attendance: 7,163; Melbourne Victory vs. Perth Glory (1 December 2018)
- Lowest attendance: 500; Melbourne City vs. Adelaide United (28 December 2018)
- Average attendance: 1,528
- All statistics correct as of 16 February 2019.

The 2018–19 W-League season was the eleventh season of the W-League, the Australian national women's soccer competition.

== Clubs ==
=== Stadia and locations ===
Team	Location	Stadium	Capacity
Adelaide United	Adelaide	Marden Sports Complex; Coopers Stadium	6,000; 16,500
Brisbane Roar	Brisbane	Suncorp Stadium; Lions Stadium	52,500; 5,000
Canberra United	Canberra	McKellar Park; Seiffert Oval	3,500; 15,000
Melbourne City	Melbourne	CB Smith Reserve; AAMI Park	2,000; 30,050
Melbourne Victory	Melbourne	Lakeside Stadium; Epping Stadium; AAMI Park; Latrobe City Stadium	12,000; 10,000; 30,050; 12,000
Newcastle Jets	Newcastle	Newcastle Number 2 Sports Ground; McDonald Jones Stadium	5,000; 33,000
Perth Glory	Perth	Dorrien Gardens nib Stadium	4,000; 20,500
Sydney FC	Sydney	Seymour Shaw; Jubilee Oval; Leichhardt Oval; WIN Stadium	5,000; 20,505; 20,000; 23,000
Western Sydney Wanderers	Sydney	Marconi Stadium; ANZ Stadium; Spotless Stadium	9,000; 83,500; 24,000

=== Personnel and kits ===
Team	Manager	Captain	Kit sponsors
Adelaide United	(Australia) Ivan Karlović	(Australia) Emma Checker	Macron
Brisbane Roar	(Australia) Melissa Andreatta	(Australia) Clare Polkinghorne	Umbro
Canberra United	(Australia) Heather Garriock	(Scotland) Rachel Corsie	Nike; University of Canberra
Melbourne City	(Australia) Rado Vidošić	(Australia) Steph Catley	Nike
Melbourne Victory	(Wales) Jeff Hopkins	(England) Natasha Dowie	Adidas
Newcastle Jets	(Australia) Craig Deans	(Australia) Cassidy Davis (Australia) Gema Simon (Australia) Emily van Egmond	Viva Teamwear; Greater Bank
Perth Glory	(Australia) Bobby Despotovski	(Australia) Sam Kerr	Macron
Sydney FC	(Australia) Ante Juric	(Australia) Teresa Polias	Puma
Western Sydney Wanderers	(Australia) Dan Barrett	(Australia) Servet Uzunlar	Nike

=== Managerial changes ===
Team	Outgoing manager	Manner of departure	Date of vacancy	Position on table	Incoming manager	Date of appointment
Melbourne City	(Australia) Patrick Kisnorbo	Coaching Restructure		Pre-season	(Australia) Rado Vidošić	19 June 2018
Western Sydney Wanderers	(Australia) Richard Byrne	New Head Coach Appointed		Pre-season	(Australia) Dan Barrett	3 August 2018

=== Foreign players ===
As of the end of the season.

Club	Visa 1	Visa 2	Visa 3	Visa 4	Non-Visa foreign(s)	Former player(s)
Adelaide United	(Iceland) Fanndís Friðriksdóttir	(Iceland) Gunnhildur Yrsa Jónsdóttir	(United States) Amber Brooks	(United States) Veronica Latsko		
Brisbane Roar	(England) Chioma Ubogagu	(Japan) Yūki Nagasato	(United States) Celeste Boureille	(United States) Carson Pickett		
Canberra United	(Chile) María José Rojas	(Scotland) Rachel Corsie	(South Africa) Refiloe Jane	(South Africa) Rhoda Mulaudzi		(Republic of Ireland) Denise O'Sullivan^{G} (United States) Paige Nielsen
Melbourne City	(Denmark) Theresa Nielsen	(Japan) Yukari Kinga	(United States) Lauren Barnes	(United States) Jasmyne Spencer	(New Zealand) Rebekah Stott^{A} (United States) Hailie Mace^{G}	(England) Jodie Taylor^{G}
Melbourne Victory	(England) Natasha Dowie	(United States) Samantha Johnson	(United States) Christine Nairn	(United States) Dani Weatherholt		
Newcastle Jets	(United States) Britt Eckerstrom	(United States) Taylor Smith	(United States) Katie Stengel	(United States) Arin Wright		
Perth Glory	(United States) Rachel Hill	(United States) Alyssa Mautz	(United States) Katie Naughton	(United States) Nikki Stanton	(Philippines) Stacey Cavill^{A}	
Sydney FC	(United States) Aubrey Bledsoe	(United States) Danielle Colaprico	(United States) Sofia Huerta	(United States) Savannah McCaskill		
Western Sydney Wanderers	(Ghana) Elizabeth Addo	(Netherlands) Maruschka Waldus	(United States) Lo'eau LaBonta	(United States) Sydney Miramontez		

The following do not fill a Visa position:
^{A} Australian citizens who have chosen to represent another national team;
^{G} Guest Players

== Regular season ==
The regular season was played between 25 October 2018 and 6 February 2019, over 14 rounds, with each team playing twelve matches.

=== League table ===
Pos	Team	Pld	W	D	L	GF	GA	GD	Pts	Qualification
1	Melbourne Victory	12	7	3	2	21	15	+6	24	Qualification to Finals series and 2019 AFC Women's Club Championship
2	Brisbane Roar	12	6	2	4	18	17	+1	20	Qualification to Finals series
3	Sydney FC (C)	12	6	1	5	28	19	+9	19	Qualification to Finals series
4	Perth Glory	12	5	4	3	28	20	+8	19	Qualification to Finals series
5	Melbourne City	12	6	1	5	20	15	+5	19	
6	Adelaide United	12	5	3	4	17	19	−2	18	
7	Newcastle Jets	12	5	1	6	18	21	−3	16	
8	Canberra United	12	3	4	5	13	18	−5	13	
9	Western Sydney Wanderers	12	1	1	10	11	30	−19	4	

Source: A-Leagues
Rules for classification: 1) points; 2) goal difference; 3) number of goals scored.
(C) Champions

=== Fixtures ===
Individual matches are collated at each club's season article.

== Finals series ==
Semi-finals
1	Melbourne Victory	2
4	Perth Glory (a.e.t.)	4
2	Brisbane Roar	1
3	Sydney FC	2

Grand Final
Sydney FC	4
Perth Glory	2

=== Semi-finals ===
10 February 2019	Melbourne Victory	2–4 (a.e.t.)	Perth Glory	Melbourne
14:00 AEDT	Nairn 2'; Maher 90+4'	Source	Kerr 74', 97', 107'; Hill 86'	Stadium: AAMI Park; Attendance: 8,599; Referee: Rachel Mitchenson

10 February 2019	Brisbane Roar	1–2	Sydney FC	Brisbane
18:15 AEST	Nagasato 90+2'	Source	Foord 33'; Huerta 68'	Stadium: Dolphin Oval; Attendance: 4,271; Referee: Rebecca Durcau

=== Grand final ===
16 February 2019	Sydney FC	4–2	Perth Glory	Sydney
16:30 AEDT	Huerta 6'; McCaskill 41', 61'; Logarzo 70'	Report	Kerr 23' (pen.); Mautz 68'	Stadium: Netstrata Jubilee Stadium; Attendance: 6,127; Referee: Kate Jacewicz

== Regular-season statistics ==
=== Top scorers ===
As of 5 February 2019, end of regular season

Rank	Player	Club	Goals
1	(Australia) Sam Kerr	Perth Glory	13
2	(England) Natasha Dowie	Melbourne Victory	9
2	(Australia) Caitlin Foord	Sydney FC	9
2	(United States) Veronica Latsko	Adelaide United	9
5	(United States) Rachel Hill	Perth Glory	5
5	(Australia) Allira Toby	Brisbane Roar	5
7	(Australia) Emily Gielnik	Melbourne Victory	4
7	(Australia) Princess Ibini	Sydney FC	4
7	(United States) Alyssa Mautz	Perth Glory	4
7	(South Africa) Rhoda Mulaudzi	Canberra United	4
7	(United States) Christine Nairn	Melbourne Victory	4
7	(United States) Jasmyne Spencer	Melbourne City	4
7	(Australia) Cortnee Vine	Newcastle Jets	4

=== Hat-tricks ===
Player	For	Against	Result	Date	Ref.
(United States) Jasmyne Spencer	Melbourne City	Sydney FC	3–1	2 November 2018	
(England) Natasha Dowie	Melbourne Victory	Sydney FC	3–2	25 November 2018	
(Australia) Caitlin Foord	Sydney FC	Brisbane Roar	5–1	9 December 2018	

=== Own goals ===
Player	Club	Against	Round
(Republic of Ireland) Denise O'Sullivan	Canberra United	Perth Glory	2
(Australia) Elise Kellond-Knight	Melbourne City	Melbourne Victory	3
(Australia) Natasha Prior	Canberra United	Adelaide United	4
(Australia) Servet Uzunlar	Western Sydney Wanderers	Canberra United	6
(Australia) Casey Dumont	Melbourne Victory	Brisbane Roar	7
(England) Natasha Dowie	Melbourne Victory	Brisbane Roar	7
(United States) Sydney Miramontez	Western Sydney Wanderers	Brisbane Roar	8
(Australia) Laura Johns	Adelaide United	Newcastle Jets	9

== Final Series statistics ==
=== Hat-tricks ===
Player	For	Against	Result	Date	Ref.
(Australia) Samantha Kerr	Perth Glory	Melbourne Victory	4–2	10 February 2019	

== End-of-season awards ==
The following end of the season awards were announced at the 2018–19 Dolan Warren Awards night on 13 May 2019.

- Julie Dolan Medal – Christine Nairn (Melbourne Victory)
- NAB Young Footballer of the Year – Ellie Carpenter (Canberra United)
- Golden Boot Award – Sam Kerr (Perth Glory) (13 goals)
- Goalkeeper of the Year – Aubrey Bledsoe (Sydney FC)
- Coach of the Year – Jeff Hopkins (Melbourne Victory)
- Fair Play Award – Newcastle Jets
- Referee of the Year – Kate Jacewicz
- Goal of the Year – Cortnee Vine (Newcastle Jets v Canberra United, 17 November 2018)

== See also ==
- W-League transfers for 2018–19 season
- 2018–19 Adelaide United W-League season
- 2018–19 Brisbane Roar W-League season
- 2018–19 Canberra United W-League season
- 2018–19 Melbourne City W-League season
- 2018–19 Melbourne Victory W-League season
- 2018–19 Newcastle Jets W-League season
- 2018–19 Perth Glory W-League season
- 2018–19 Sydney FC W-League season
- 2018–19 Western Sydney Wanderers W-League season
