= Katie Lind =

American soccer player (born 1994)

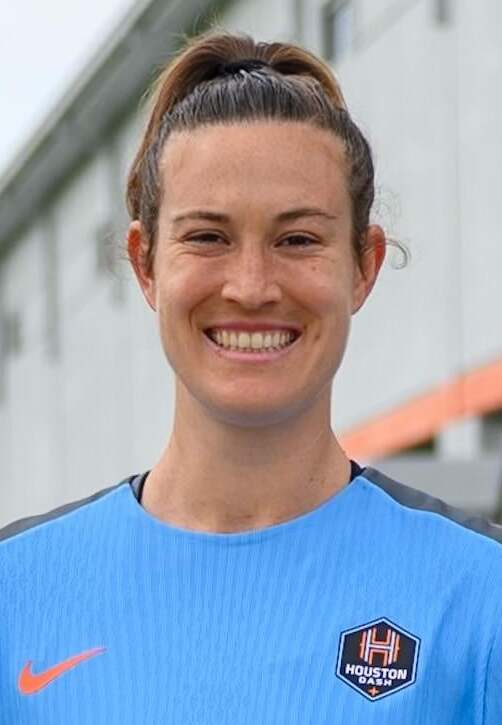
- Lind with the Houston Dash in 2025

Personal information
- Full name: Kathleen Camille Lind
- Birth name: Kathleen Camille Naughton
- Date of birth: February 15, 1994 (age 32)
- Place of birth: Elk Grove Village, Illinois
- Height: 5 ft 10 in (1.78 m)
- Position: Center back

Youth career
- Sockers FC
- Elk Grove High School

College career
Years	Team	Apps	(Gls)
2012–2015	Notre Dame Fighting Irish	87	(11)

Senior career*
Years	Team	Apps	(Gls)
2016–2019	Chicago Red Stars	88	(1)
2016–2018	→ Adelaide United (loan)	24	(2)
2018–2020	→ Perth Glory (loan)	10	(0)
2020–2025	Houston Dash	79	(3)
Total		201	(6)

International career
2009–2010	United States U17		
2012–2014	United States U20		
2016–2017	United States U23		
- * Club domestic league appearances and goals as of 15:06, December 10, 2025 (UTC)

Kathleen Camille Lind (née Naughton; born February 15, 1994) is an American former professional soccer player who played as a center back. She played college soccer for the Notre Dame Fighting Irish before being selected by the Chicago Red Stars in the 2016 NWSL College Draft. She spent four seasons with Chicago, including loan spells to Australian clubs Adelaide United and Perth Glory, before joining the Houston Dash in 2020. With the Dash, Lind contributed to a 2020 NWSL Challenge Cup victory.

== Early life ==
Lind played for Chicago Sockers FC during her youth, and played for Notre Dame Fighting Irish in Atlantic Coast Conference, during her college years In 2012, Lind was named to NSCAA All-Northeast Region Second Team; All-BIG EAST Third Team; BIG EAST All-Rookie Team; and was also named Notre Dame Team Most Valuable Freshman.

== College career ==
Beginning in 2013, Lind captained the Notre Dame Soccer Team, making her the first Notre Dame three-year captain. The following year, she was named to several honorary teams: All-ACC Second Team; First Team NSCAA Scholar All-North/Central Region; Third Team NSCAA Scholar All-American; NSCAA Second Team All-Southeast Region. Lind also received the Notre Dame OSCARS Francis Patrick O'Connor Award.

== Club career ==
=== Chicago Red Stars ===
Lind was selected by Chicago Red Stars as the nineteenth selection in second round in 2016 NWSL College Draft. She scored her first career NWSL goal on June 24, 2018, in a 2–0 win over the Utah Royals FC.

==== Loan to Adelaide United ====
In October 2016, Lind was loaned to Australian club Adelaide United along with her teammates Danielle Colaprico and Sofia Huerta. Lind re-signed with the club in October 2017, along with her teammates Danielle Colaprico and Alyssa Mautz.

==== Loan to Perth Glory ====
Lind signed with Australian club Perth Glory for the 2018–19 W-League Season, along with Red Stars team-mates Sam Kerr, Alyssa Mautz and Nikki Stanton.

=== Houston Dash ===
On January 6, 2020, it was announced that Lind and Chicago's 18th overall selection in the 2020 NWSL College Draft were to be traded to the Houston Dash in exchange for forward Kealia Ohai. Lind made her Dash debut on June 30, 2020, helping kick off Houston's 2020 NWSL Challenge Cup-winning campaign. She scored her first goal for Houston in June 2021, the game-winner in a victory over the Kansas City Current. She made 79 NWSL regular season appearances for the Dash before retiring from professional soccer at the end of 2025.

== International career ==
Lind started her international competition at an early age of 15. She competed with the United States under-17 women's national soccer team in international friendly, as well as with United States under-18 women's national soccer team. Lind played 4 matches at 2014 FIFA U-20 Women's World Cup. Lind was a part of the United States under-23 women's national soccer team which competed and won the 2016 Istria Cup in Croatia.

== Personal life ==
Lind is the only child of Claire and Tom Naughton. She pursued double majors in anthropology and Spanish at Notre Dame and was named to the Dean's list for the 2012 fall semester. She was one of two team representatives to Notre Dame's Student-Athlete Advisory Council. Lind earned certificates of merit in Notre Dame's Rosenthal Leadership Academy between 2012 and 2014. She married Kevin Lind in Chicago on December 31, 2022.

== Honors ==
Houston Dash

- NWSL Challenge Cup: 2020
