= Sofia Huerta =

American soccer player (born 1992)

- Huerta with the Seattle Reign in 2026

Personal information
- Full name: Sofia Christine Huerta
- Date of birth: December 14, 1992 (age 33)
- Place of birth: Boise, Idaho, United States
- Height: 5 ft 7 in (1.70 m)
- Position: Right back

Team information
- Current team: Seattle Reign
- Number: 11

College career
| Years | Team | Apps | (Gls) |
| 2011–2014 | Santa Clara Broncos | 81 | (47) |

Senior career*
| Years | Team | Apps | (Gls) |
| 2015–2018 | Chicago Red Stars | 63 | (19) |
| 2016–2017 | → Adelaide United (loan) | 12 | (8) |
| 2018–2019 | Houston Dash | 47 | (13) |
| 2018–2020 | → Sydney FC (loan) | 23 | (6) |
| 2020– | Seattle Reign | 120 | (9) |
| 2024–2025 | → Lyon (loan) | 9 | (1) |

International career^{‡}
| 2012 | United States U20 | | |
| 2012 | Mexico U20 | 4 | (3) |
| 2012–2013 | Mexico | 5 | (2) |
| 2017–2023 | United States | 32 | (0) |
- * Club domestic league appearances and goals as of 16:34, November 8, 2026 (UTC) ‡ National team caps and goals as of October 29, 2023

Sofia Christine Huerta (born December 14, 1992) is an American professional soccer player who plays as a right back for Seattle Reign FC of the National Women's Soccer League (NWSL). She played college soccer for the Santa Clara Broncos before being drafted by the Chicago Red Stars in 2015. She was traded to the Houston Dash in 2018 and to the Reign in 2020.

Having represented Mexico internationally, Huerta filed a one-time switch and debuted for the United States national team on September 15, 2017. After facing her former national team on April 8, 2018, she became the first female player to play both for and against the U.S. and Mexico. She has made 32 international appearances for the United States.

== Early life ==
The daughter of Puebla, México, native Mauricio Huerta, an electrical engineer, and Jody Jensen Huerta, Huerta attended Centennial High School in Boise, Idaho. She played soccer, basketball, and ran track. She was named Idaho Gatorade Player of the Year twice in soccer, playing for FC NOVA, All-Idaho First Team Basketball selection (2011), and set high-school records for fastest time running the 100 and 300-meter hurdle races (2011). She was also named to several All-Academic teams (2007–2011).

== College career ==
Huerta was a four-year starter as a forward for Santa Clara University in Santa Clara, California. As a freshman, she was All-West Coast Conference, scoring eight goals and two assists. As a sophomore, she was again All-West Coast Conference and NCAA Division 1 Women All-West Region Second Team. She scored six goals and six assists.

As a junior in 2013, Huerta was again First Team All-WCC, scoring 16 goals and with 8 assists, leading her team in goals scored and tying for the lead in assists. She was a third-team All-American selection. In her senior year in 2014 she scored 17 goals with 3 assists and was again a third-team All-American selection and co-player of the year in the West Coast Conference.

== Club career ==
=== Chicago Red Stars, 2015–2018 ===
Huerta was drafted to play for the Chicago Red Stars of the National Women's Soccer League in the college draft on January 16, 2015. She was the eleventh player selected overall. On May 9, 2015, with teammate and United States international forward Christen Press away at World Cup training camp, Huerta scored her first 2 professional goals in a 3–0 win against Boston Breakers to place the Red Stars at the top of the NWSL league. She was subsequently named NWSL Player of the Week for week five. In week six of NWSL season Huerta scored 2 goals against the Houston Dash to level the score and tie the match, and was named Player of the Week for week 6. On June 3, 2015, Huerta was voted NWSL Player of the Month for the month of May by the media. On September 9, 2015, the NWSL announced that Huerta was selected as a finalist for the NWSL Rookie of the Year award for the 2015 season, along with Sam Mewis and the eventual winner, fellow Red Star Danielle Colaprico.

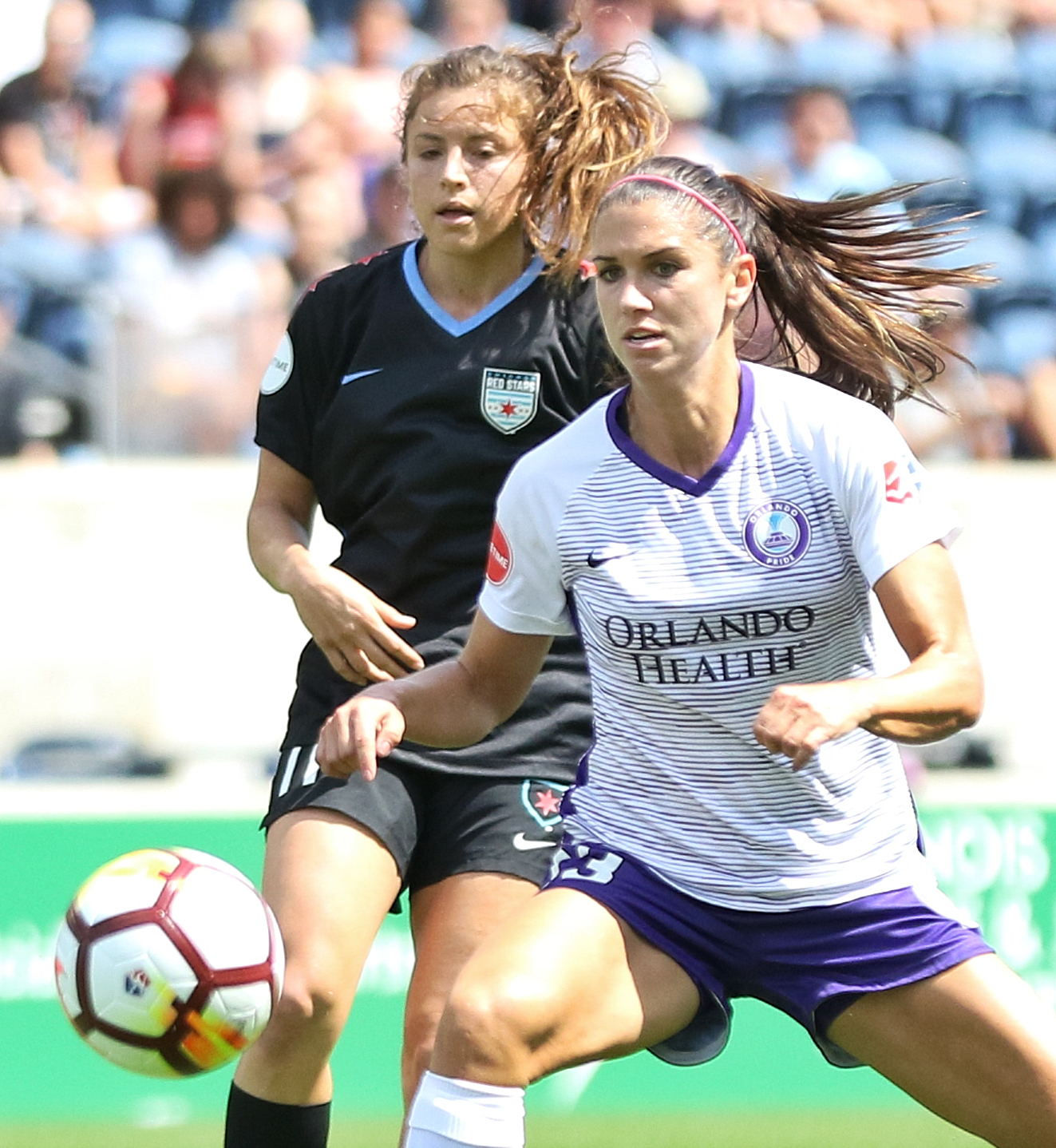
Huerta (left) and Alex Morgan in 2018

Huerta was on the Second XI of the NWSL in 2015 as a forward and in 2017 as a midfielder. On April 24, 2018, she was named player of the week by the NWSL. The NWSL Media Association named Huerta player of the month for April,

On June 16, 2018, it was announced that Huerta would be unavailable for Chicago's match that night against the Portland Thorns due to a pending trade. On June 18, 2018, Huerta and Taylor Comeau were traded to the Houston Dash as part of a three team trade which also included the Utah Royals. Huerta had requested the trade in hopes of getting more playing time as an outside back, which is the position where USWNT coach Jill Ellis had Huerta playing for the United States.

==== Loan to Adelaide United ====
In October 2016, Huerta was loaned to Australian W-League club Adelaide United along with her Red Stars teammates Katie Naughton and Danielle Colaprico. Playing in the midfield, Huerta scored 8 goals and had 5 assists in a 12-match season. She was named Professional Footballers Australia Player of the Month for the W-League in January 2017. Huerta was awarded Adelaide United's W-League Player of the Year at the club's annual award ceremony. Huerta came in 3rd in the race for the Julie Dolan Medal receiving 17 votes.

=== Houston Dash, 2018–2019 ===
After being acquired by the Dash on June 18, 2018, she starred in Houston's next game on June 22, where Huerta scored the Dash's only goal in a 3–1 loss to Portland. Huerta played primarily as a midfielder and forward for Houston, even though she wanted to play outside back. She appeared in 12 games and scored 5 goals. Huerta was named to the NWSL Second XI.

==== Loan to Sydney FC ====
It was announced on September 28, 2018, that Huerta would be joining Sydney FC in the W-League for the 2018–19 W-League season. She was one of four American players joining the club, alongside former Red Stars teammate Danielle Colaprico, Aubrey Bledsoe of the Washington Spirit and Savannah McCaskill of Sky Blue FC. When Huerta signed with Sydney they agreed to play her at outside back, as she hopes to get called back in to the USWNT.

Huerta played in every minute of every game in the 2018–19 season for Sydney. She scored a goal in Sydney's semi–final match against Brisbane, which Sydney won 2–1. Huerta scored again in the Grand Final, helping Sydney to a 4–2 victory over Perth, winning the 2018–19 W-League Championship.

=== OL Reign, 2020 ===
On February 3, 2020, OL Reign acquired Huerta and Amber Brooks from Houston in exchange for Shea Groom, Megan Oyster, and a conditional draft pick.

Huerta was nominated for NWSL Defender of the Year alongside teammate Alana Cook in the 2022 season.

==== Loan to Lyon ====
On September 12, 2024, Huerta joined French Première Ligue side Lyon on a loan deal until the end of the 2024–25 season.

== International career ==
Huerta was not selected by the United States team for the FIFA U-20 Women's World Cup in Japan in August 2012; she was selected for the Mexico team, for which she qualified to play for though her father. Playing with a broken elbow, she scored three of Mexico's seven goals in its two win and two loss performance. In December 2012, Huerta played for the Mexico women's national team at the City of São Paulo International Women's Football Tournament, scoring two goals. Huerta was a second-half substitute for Mexico in its September 4, 2013 match with the United States. In December 2014, Huerta announced that she was not going to continue to play with the Mexico national team, but would attempt to become a member of the U.S. national team.

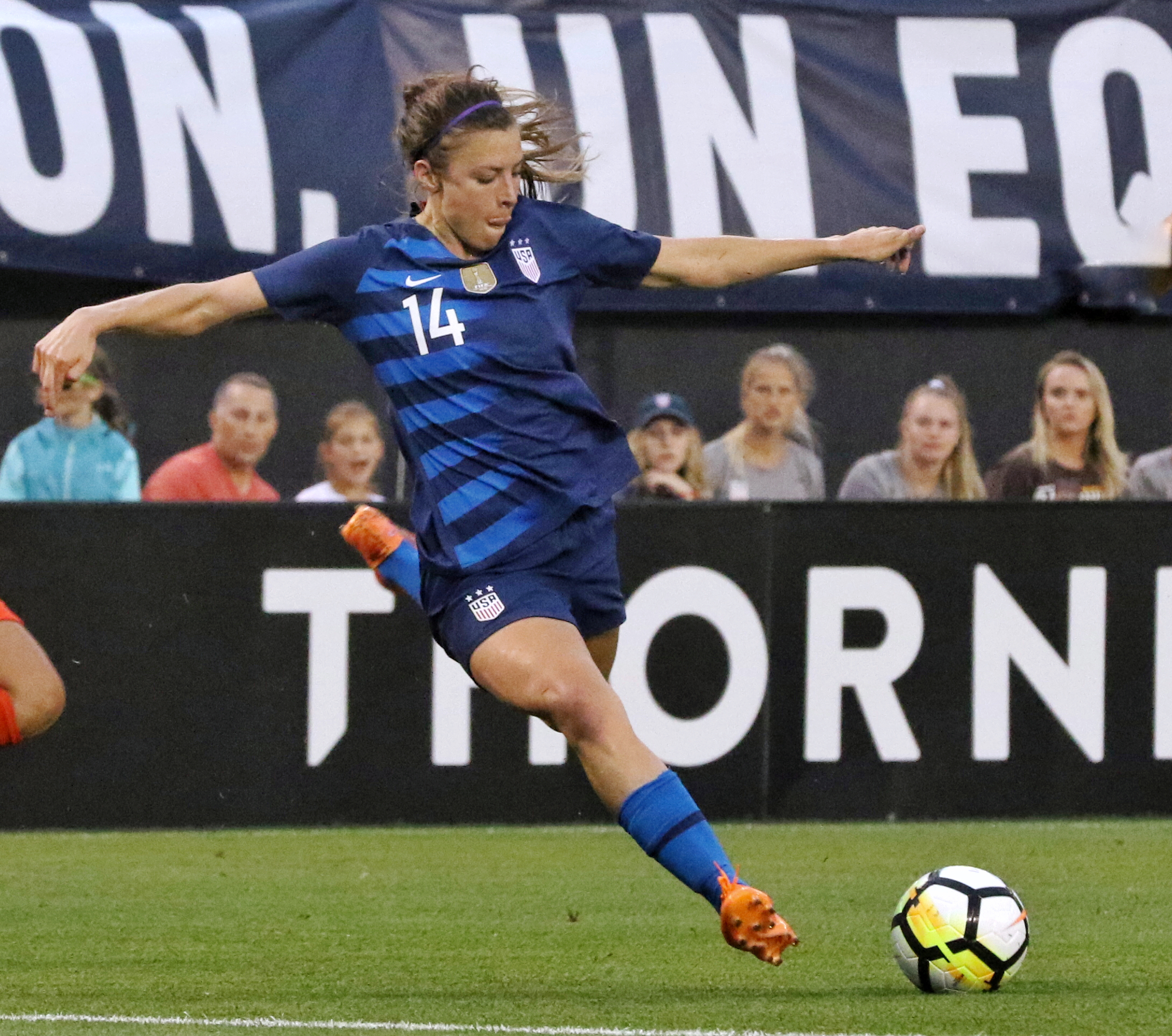
Huerta in 2018

The United States Soccer Federation announced in July 2017 that they were submitting a request to FIFA to change Huerta's affiliation to the United States women's national soccer team. The change was approved on September 14, 2017.

Huerta earned her first cap for the United States versus New Zealand two days later (September 16, 2017), coming on as a substitute in the 51st minute. She also was credited with her first assist for the United States for her pass to Alex Morgan in the 79th minute of her debut game. Huerta thus became the first female player to play both for the United States national team and against the United States national team (as a member of the Mexico national team).

Huerta was on the provisional roster for the 2018 CONCACAF Women's Championship but was not named to the final 20 player roster. For several years, she did not receive a call-up to the USWNT after June 2018, after being called in to every camp in the past year; because of this Huerta has sought out club opportunities to play outside back in hopes of getting back on the roster.

In 2022, Huerta was called back up by the USWNT to play in the 2022 CONCACAF Women's Championship qualifiers.

Huerta along with Veronica Zepeda are to date the only two women who have represented both the United States and Mexico women's national teams.

In June 2023, Huerta was named to the U.S. squad for the 2023 FIFA Women's World Cup in Australia and New Zealand. She made her debut during the team's first group stage match against Vietnam, which was a 3–0 shutout win for the Americans.

== Personal life ==
Huerta appeared in a Netflix documentary series, which follows the U.S. Women's National Soccer Team as they compete in the 2023 FIFA Women's World Cup. The docuseries premiered in fall 2023.

She is in a relationship with Spencer Wadsworth. They got engaged in February 2024 and married in June 2025.

Huerta is a vegan.

== Career statistics ==
=== College ===
| College | Season | Apps | Goals | Assists |
|---|---|---|---|---|
| Santa Clara Broncos | 2011–12 | 22 | 8 | 2 |
| Santa Clara Broncos | 2012–13 | 17 | 6 | 6 |
| Santa Clara Broncos | 2013–14 | 22 | 16 | 8 |
| Santa Clara Broncos | 2014–15 | 20 | 17 | 3 |
| Career total | | 81 | 47 | 19 |

=== Club ===
As of February 16, 2025

| Club | Season | League | | | National Cup (Note: Includes 2020 NWSL Fall Series and NWSL Challenge Cups) | | Continental | | Playoffs (Note: Includes NWSL Playoffs and W-League playoffs) | | Total | |
| Club | Season | Division | Apps | Goals | Apps | Goals | Apps | Goals | Apps | Goals | Apps | Goals |
|---|---|---|---|---|---|---|---|---|---|---|---|---|
| Chicago Red Stars | 2015 | NWSL | 19 | 6 | — | | — | | 1 | 0 | 20 | 6 |
| Chicago Red Stars | 2016 | NWSL | 20 | 7 | — | | — | | 1 | 0 | 21 | 7 |
| Chicago Red Stars | 2017 | NWSL | 24 | 6 | — | | — | | 1 | 0 | 25 | 6 |
| Houston Dash | 2018 | NWSL | 23 | 8 | — | | — | | — | | 23 | 8 |
| Houston Dash | 2019 | NWSL | 24 | 5 | — | | — | | — | | 24 | 5 |
| Seattle Reign | 2020 | NWSL | 4 | 1 | 2 | 0 | — | | — | | 6 | 1 |
| Seattle Reign | 2021 | NWSL | 23 | 1 | 4 | 1 | — | | 1 | 0 | 28 | 2 |
| Seattle Reign | 2022 | NWSL | 19 | 1 | 7 | 1 | — | | 1 | 0 | 27 | 2 |
| Seattle Reign | 2023 | NWSL | 17 | 1 | 4 | 0 | — | | 3 | 0 | 24 | 1 |
| Seattle Reign | 2024 | NWSL | 19 | 2 | — | | 3 | 1 | — | | 22 | 3 |
| Seattle Reign | Total | | 192 | 38 | 17 | 2 | 3 | 1 | 8 | 0 | 220 | 41 |
| Adelaide United (loan) | 2016–17 | W-League | 12 | 8 | — | | — | | — | | 12 | 8 |
| Sydney FC (loan) | 2018–19 | W-League | 12 | 3 | — | | — | | 2 | 1 | 14 | 4 |
| Sydney FC (loan) | 2019–20 | W-League | 11 | 3 | — | | — | | 2 | 0 | 13 | 3 |
| Lyon (loan) | 2024–25 | Division 1 Féminine | 9 | 1 | — | | 2 | 0 | — | | 11 | 1 |
| Lyon (loan) | Total | | 44 | 15 | 0 | 0 | 2 | 0 | 4 | 1 | 50 | 16 |
| Career Total | | | 236 | 47 | 17 | 3 | 5 | 1 | 12 | 1 | 270 | 57 |

=== International ===
As of match played October 29, 2023

Appearances and goals by national team and year
| National team | Year | Apps | Goals |
|---|---|---|---|
| Mexico | 2012 | 4 | 2 |
| Mexico | 2013 | 1 | 0 |
| Mexico | Total | 5 | 2 |
| United States | 2017 | 3 | 0 |
| United States | 2018 | 4 | 0 |
| United States | 2021 | 2 | 0 |
| United States | 2022 | 16 | 0 |
| United States | 2023 | 5 | 0 |
| United States | Total | 32 | 0 |
| Career total | | 37 | 2 |

== Honors ==
Sydney FC

- W-League Championship: 2018–19

OL Reign

- NWSL Shield: 2022
- The Women's Cup: 2022

United States

- CONCACAF Women's Championship: 2022
- SheBelieves Cup: 2018; 2022, 2023

Individual

- NWSL Best XI: 2022
- NWSL Second XI: 2015, 2017, 2018, 2021

== See also ==
- List of United States women's international soccer players
- List of Mexico women's international footballers
- List of sportspeople who competed for more than one nation
- List of foreign A-League Women players
- List of A-League Women hat-tricks
- List of Santa Clara University people
- List of people from Boise, Idaho
