= 2019 AFC Women's Club Championship =

Tournament details
- Host country: South Korea
- City: Yongin
- Dates: 26–30 November
- Teams: 4 (from 4 associations)
- Venue: 1 (in 1 host city)

Final positions
- Champions: (Japan) Nippon TV Beleza (1st title)
- Runners-up: (China) Jiangsu Suning
- Third place: (South Korea) Incheon Red Angels
- Fourth place: (Australia) Melbourne Victory

Tournament statistics
- Matches played: 6
- Goals scored: 17 (2.83 per match)
- Attendance: 1,296 (216 per match)
- Top scorer: (Japan) Mina Tanaka (4 goals)

The 2019 AFC Women's Club Championship was the first edition of the Asia's women's club football competition organised by AFC, held in South Korea between 26 and 30 November 2019. Four clubs from four associations competed in this edition, which was also known as 2019 FIFA–AFC Pilot Women's Club Championship.

== Teams ==
The following teams qualified for the tournament.

Team	Qualifying method	App. (last)
(Australia) Melbourne Victory	2018–19 W-League premiers	1st
(China) Jiangsu Suning	2019 Chinese Women's Super League champions	1st
(Japan) Nippon TV Beleza	2018 Nadeshiko League Division 1 champions	1st
(South Korea) Incheon Red Angels	2018 WK League champions	1st

== Venue ==
All matches were played at Yongin Citizen Sports Park, Yongin.

== Format ==
Teams played in a single round-robin.

== Standings ==
Pos	Team	Pld	W	D	L	GF	GA	GD	Pts
1	(Japan) Nippon TV Beleza (C)	3	2	1	0	8	1	+7	7
2	(China) Jiangsu Suning	3	1	2	0	4	2	+2	5
3	(South Korea) Incheon Red Angels (H)	3	1	0	2	4	4	0	3
4	(Australia) Melbourne Victory	3	0	1	2	1	10	−9	1

Source: AFC
(C) Champions; (H) Hosts

== Matches ==
All times are local KST (UTC+9).

26 November 2019
15:45

Nippon TV Beleza (Japan)	1–1	(China) Jiangsu Suning
Tanaka 9'	Live Report; Stats Report	Chawinga 7'

Yongin Citizen Sports Park, Yongin
Attendance: 110
Referee: Kate Jacewicz (Australia)
26 November 2019
19:00

Melbourne Victory (Australia)	0–4	(South Korea) Incheon Red Angels
	Live Report; Stats Report	Kim Dam-bi 24'; Thaisinha 33'; Lee Sea-eun 57', 58'

Yongin Citizen Sports Park, Yongin
Attendance: 310
Referee: Yoshimi Yamashita (Japan)

28 November 2019
15:45

Jiangsu Suning (China)	1–1	(Australia) Melbourne Victory
Tang Jiali 12'	Live Report; Stats Report	Maher 11'

Yongin Citizen Sports Park, Yongin
Attendance: 80
Referee: Abirami Naidu (Singapore)
28 November 2019
19:00

Incheon Red Angels (South Korea)	0–2	(Japan) Nippon TV Beleza
	Live Report; Stats Report	Ueki 49'; Kobayashi 90+4'

Yongin Citizen Sports Park, Yongin
Attendance: 210
Referee: Qin Liang (China)

30 November 2019
12:00

Melbourne Victory (Australia)	0–5	(Japan) Nippon TV Beleza
	Live Report; Stats Report	Tanaka 8', 48', 55'; Ito 38' (pen.); Iwasaki 90+1'

Yongin Citizen Sports Park, Yongin
Attendance: 85
Referee: Bùi Thị Thu Trang (Vietnam)
30 November 2019
15:15

Jiangsu Suning (China)	2–0	(South Korea) Incheon Red Angels
Chawinga 10', 50'	Live Report; Stats Report

Yongin Citizen Sports Park, Yongin
Attendance: 501
Referee: Abirami Naidu (Singapore)

== Goalscorers ==
Rank	Player	Team	Goals
1	(Japan) Mina Tanaka	(Japan) Nippon TV Beleza	4
2	(Malawi) Tabitha Chawinga	(China) Jiangsu Suning	3
3	(South Korea) Lee Sea-eun	(South Korea) Incheon Red Angels	2
4	(Japan) Sara Ito	(Japan) Nippon TV Beleza	1
4	(Japan) Kokona Iwasaki	(Japan) Nippon TV Beleza	1
4	(South Korea) Kim Dam-bi	(South Korea) Incheon Red Angels	1
4	(Japan) Rikako Kobayashi	(Japan) Nippon TV Beleza	1
4	(Australia) Grace Maher	(Australia) Melbourne Victory	1
4	(China) Tang Jiali	(China) Jiangsu Suning	1
4	(Brazil) Thaisinha	(South Korea) Incheon Red Angels	1
4	(Japan) Riko Ueki	(Japan) Nippon TV Beleza	1

== See also ==
- 2019–20 UEFA Women's Champions League
- 2019 WAFF Women's Clubs Championship
- 2019 Copa Libertadores Femenina
- 2019 AFC Champions League
