= A-League Women transfers for 2022–23 season =

This is a list of Australian soccer transfers for the 2022–23 A-League Women. Only moves featuring at least one A-League Women club are listed.

== Transfers ==
All players without a flag are Australian. Clubs without a flag are clubs participating in the A-League Women.

=== Pre-season ===
Date	Name	Moving from	Moving to
21 January 2022	(Canada) Isabella Habuda	Western Sydney Wanderers	(Australia) Souths United
2 March 2022	(United States) Chelsee Washington	Canberra United	(United States) Orlando Pride (end of loan)
2 March 2022	(Norway) Marie Dølvik Markussen	Newcastle Jets	(Norway) Rosenborg
11 March 2022	(United States) Elizabeth Eddy	Newcastle Jets	(United States) Houston Dash (Note: Eddy was originally loaned to Newcastle Jets by Gotham FC, but was traded to Houston Dash during the 2021–22 season.)
15 March 2022	Leena Khamis	Perth Glory	(Australia) Macarthur Rams
16 March 2022	Kyra Cooney-Cross	Melbourne Victory	(Sweden) Hammarby
16 March 2022	Courtney Nevin	Melbourne Victory	(Sweden) Hammarby
19 March 2022	(Denmark) Mie Leth Jans	Perth Glory	(Sweden) Vittsjö
28 March 2022	(United States) Kayla Sharples	Adelaide United	(United States) Chicago Red Stars (end of loan)
28 March 2022	Remy Siemsen	Sydney FC	(Sweden) AIK
1 April 2022	Margaux Chauvet	Western Sydney Wanderers	(Iceland) KR Reykjavik
4 April 2022	Ally Green	Sydney FC	(Norway) Vålerenga
4 April 2022	Alex Chidiac (Note: Chidiac returned from loan to her parent club JEF United Chiba before signing with Racing Louisville)	Melbourne Victory	(United States) Racing Louisville
6 April 2022	Isabella Foletta	Brisbane Roar	(Australia) Macarthur Rams
6 April 2022	Teigan Collister	Western Sydney Wanderers	(Australia) Sydney Olympic
6 April 2022	Ashlie Crofts	Western Sydney Wanderers	(Australia) Blacktown Spartans
6 April 2022	Rosie Galea	Western Sydney Wanderers	(Australia) Blacktown Spartans
6 April 2022	Bianca Galic	Western Sydney Wanderers	(Australia) Sydney University
6 April 2022	Erica Halloway	Western Sydney Wanderers	(Australia) Illawarra Stingrays
6 April 2022	Alexandra Huynh	Western Sydney Wanderers	(Australia) Macarthur Rams
6 April 2022	Sarah Morgan	Western Sydney Wanderers	(Australia) Sydney University
6 April 2022	Nikola Orgill	Western Sydney Wanderers	(Australia) NWS Spirit
6 April 2022	Elizabeth Ralston	Western Sydney Wanderers	(Australia) APIA Leichhardt
6 April 2022	Isabella Whitton	Western Sydney Wanderers	(Australia) NWS Spirit
6 April 2022	Chantelle Symes	Brisbane Roar	(Australia) Olympic FC
12 April 2022	Libby Copus-Brown	Western Sydney Wanderers	(Australia) Newcastle Olympic
13 April 2022	Melina Ayres	Melbourne Victory	(Iceland) Breiðablik (loan)
21 June 2022	Nickoletta Flannery	Unattached	Canberra United (Note: Player signed a two-year contract.)
23 June 2022	Winonah Heatley	Melbourne City	(Denmark) Nordsjælland
30 June 2022	Coco Majstorovic	Melbourne City	Unattached
10 July 2022	Anna Margraf	Brisbane Roar	(Germany) SV Meppen
12 July 2022	Ella Mastrantonio	(Italy) Pomigliano	Perth Glory
15 July 2022	(New Zealand) Grace Jale	Wellington Phoenix	Canberra United
15 July 2022	Grace Taranto	Adelaide United	Canberra United
20 July 2022	(New Zealand) Paige Satchell	Sydney FC	Wellington Phoenix
21 July 2022	(New Zealand) Rebekah Stott	Melbourne City	(England) Brighton & Hove Albion
21 July 2022	(United States) Brooke Hendrix	Melbourne Victory	(England) Reading
25 July 2022	(New Zealand) Betsy Hassett	(Iceland) Stjarnan	Wellington Phoenix
27 July 2022	Holly Murray	(Australia) South Melbourne	Canberra United
28 July 2022	Matilda McNamara	Adelaide United	(Denmark) AGF
29 July 2022	Sarah Langman	Western Sydney Wanderers	Perth Glory
2 August 2022	Milan Hammond	(Australia) Blacktown Spartans	Perth Glory
3 August 2022	Emma Checker	Melbourne City	(Sweden) Umeå (loan)
4 August 2022	Alana Cerne	(Australia) Calder United	Western United
5 August 2022	Polly Doran	Melbourne Victory	(England) Crystal Palace (loan)
9 August 2022	(United States) Hannah Keane	(Spain) Sporting de Huelva	Western United
10 August 2022	Kahli Johnson	Sydney FC	Western United
10 August 2022	Sharn Freier	(Australia) Moreton Bay United	Brisbane Roar
16 August 2022	Adriana Taranto	(Australia) Calder United	Western United
16 August 2022	Melissa Taranto	(Australia) Calder United	Western United
18 August 2022	(Philippines) Jaclyn Sawicki	Unattached	Western United
19 August 2022	Ellie Brush	Sydney FC	Canberra United
22 August 2022	Georgia Beaumont (Note: Beaumont spent the off-season at Moreton Bay United.)	Adelaide United	Brisbane Roar
23 August 2022	(Netherlands) Maruschka Waldus	(Netherlands) PSV	Adelaide United
24 August 2022	Emma Robers (Note: Robers spent the off-season at Calder United.)	Melbourne Victory	Western United
24 August 2022	Julia Sardo	(Australia) Calder United	Western United
26 August 2022	Aleksandra Sinclair	(Australia) Calder United	Western United
30 August 2022	Francesca Iermano (Note: Iermano spent the off-season at South Melbourne.)	Melbourne Victory	Western United
31 August 2022	Talitha Kramer (Note: Kramer spent the off-season at Capalaba FC.)	Wellington Phoenix	Brisbane Roar
1 September 2022	Alyssa Dall'Oste	(Australia) Calder United	Western United
1 September 2022	Natasha Dakic	(Australia) Calder United	Western United
5 September 2022	Jessika Nash	Sydney FC	Melbourne Victory
6 September 2022	Leia Puxty	(Australia) Adamstown Rosebud	Newcastle Jets
6 September 2022	Miranda Templeman	Adelaide United	Melbourne Victory
7 September 2022	Emily Roach	(Australia) Heidelberg United	Canberra United
7 September 2022	(New Zealand) Marisa van der Meer	Melbourne City	Wellington Phoenix
7 September 2022	Gema Simon (Note: Simon spent the off-season at Þróttur Reykjavík.)	Newcastle Jets	Melbourne Victory
8 September 2022	Silver Bell Morris	(Australia) FV Emerging	Western United
8 September 2022	Natalie Tathem	Brisbane Roar	Melbourne Victory
9 September 2022	Beattie Goad	Unattached	Melbourne Victory
9 September 2022	Caitlin Cooper	Western Sydney Wanderers	Retired
11 September 2022	Ava Briedis	Unattached	Melbourne Victory
11 September 2022	Rosie Curtis	Unattached	Melbourne Victory
12 September 2022	(United States) Gabriella Coleman	(Iceland) HK Kópavogur	Perth Glory
13 September 2022	Chloe Logarzo	(United States) Kansas City Current	Western United (loan)
13 September 2022	Jenna McCormick	Unattached	Adelaide United
13 September 2022	Kirsty Fenton	Newcastle Jets	Sydney FC
13 September 2022	Abbey Lemon	(Australia) Blacktown Spartans	Sydney FC
13 September 2022	Jynaya Dos Santos	(Australia) FNSW Institute	Sydney FC
13 September 2022	Deborah-Anne De la Harpe	Perth Glory	Sydney FC
13 September 2022	Indiana Dos Santos	Unattached	Sydney FC
13 September 2022	Anika Stajcic	Unattached	Sydney FC
14 September 2022	Katie Bowler	(Australia) Adelaide City	Adelaide United
14 September 2022	Sasha Coorey	(Australia) FFSA NTC	Adelaide United
14 September 2022	Zoe Tolland	(Australia) Adelaide City	Adelaide United
14 September 2022	Sunny Franco	Newcastle Jets	Unattached
14 September 2022	Tiana Jaber	Newcastle Jets	Unattached
14 September 2022	(United States) Emily Garnier	(United States) Chicago Red Stars	Newcastle Jets
15 September 2022	Kijah Stephenson	(Australia) Brisbane City	Brisbane Roar
16 September 2022	(Serbia) Tyla-Jay Vlajnic (Note: Vlajnic spent the off-season at Spartak Subotica.)	Melbourne City	Western United
16 September 2022	MelindaJ Barbieri (Note: Barbieri spent the off-season at Box Hill United.)	Melbourne Victory	Adelaide United
16 September 2022	Meisha Westland	Melbourne City	Adelaide United
19 September 2022	Chloe Walandouw	Unattached	Newcastle Jets
19 September 2022	Anna Liacopoulos	Unattached	Melbourne Victory
21 September 2022	(France) Margot Robinne	Canberra United	Brisbane Roar
21 September 2022	Jenna Farrow	(Australia) South Melbourne	Adelaide United
21 September 2022	Harriet Withers (Note: Withers spent the off-season at Calder United.)	Melbourne Victory	Western United
21 September 2022	Raquel Deralas	(Australia) Calder United	Western United
21 September 2022	Stacey Papadopoulos	(Australia) Calder United	Western United
22 September 2022	Bryleeh Henry	Western Sydney Wanderers	Melbourne City
23 September 2022	Amy Harrison	(Netherlands) PSV	Western Sydney Wanderers
24 September 2022	Sienna Saveska	(Australia) FNSW Institute	Western Sydney Wanderers
25 September 2022	Teigen Allen	Western Sydney Wanderers	Newcastle Jets
28 September 2022	(United States) Hillary Beall	(United States) Racing Louisville	Western United (loan)
29 September 2022	(Guyana) Sydney Cummings	(United States) San Diego Wave	Western United
30 September 2022	(New Zealand) Michaela Robertson	Phoenix Academy	Wellington Phoenix
1 October 2022	Melina Ayres	(Iceland) Breiðablik	Melbourne Victory (end of loan)
4 October 2022	Karly Roestbakken (Note: Roestbakken returned from loan to her parent club LSK Kvinner before signing with Melbourne City)	Canberra United	Melbourne City
5 October 2022	Lauren Keir	Canberra United	Western Sydney Wanderers
5 October 2022	Clauda Cicco	(Australia) APIA Leichhardt	Wellington Phoenix
5 October 2022	(United States) Cannon Clough	Brisbane Roar	Newcastle Jets
6 October 2022	Angelique Hristodoulou	Sydney FC	Western Sydney Wanderers
7 October 2022	(United States) Rylee Baisden	(United States) North Carolina Courage	Perth Glory
10 October 2022	Melissa Caceres	(Australia) Macarthur Rams	Western Sydney Wanderers
12 October 2022	(United States) Hensley Hancuff	(United States) Gotham FC	Brisbane Roar (loan)
12 October 2022	Holly Caspers	Canberra United	Western Sydney Wanderers
12 October 2022	Tessa Tamplin	(Switzerland) Servette	Newcastle Jets
14 October 2022	Ellen Gett	Brisbane Roar	Canberra United
14 October 2022	Shadeene Evans	Adelaide United	Sydney FC
14 October 2022	(New Zealand) Anna Green	(New Zealand) Capital Football	Sydney FC
14 October 2022	(United States) Madison Haley	(United States) Stanford Cardinal	Sydney FC
15 October 2022	Teresa Morrissey	(Australia) Alamein	Western Sydney Wanderers
17 October 2022	(Serbia) Vesna Milivojević	(Serbia) Spartak Subotica	Canberra United
17 October 2022	(United States) Jordyn Bloomer	(United States) Racing Louisville	Western Sydney Wanderers (loan)
18 October 2022	(United States) Julia Grosso	(United States) Kentucky Wildcats	Melbourne City
18 October 2022	Georgina Worth	Brisbane Roar	Newcastle Jets
19 October 2022	Keely Segavcic	(Australia) Northbridge Bulls	Canberra United
19 October 2022	Daniela Galic	(Australia) FNSW Institute	Melbourne City
19 October 2022	(United States) Jessica McDonald	(United States) Racing Louisville	Western United (loan)
20 October 2022	Sophie Stapleford	(Australia) Maitland FC	Newcastle Jets
21 October 2022	Alex Chidiac	(United States) Racing Louisville	Melbourne Victory (loan)
21 October 2022	(New Zealand) Georgia Candy	Unattached	Wellington Phoenix
21 October 2022	(New Zealand) Michaela Foster	(New Zealand) Northern Rovers	Wellington Phoenix
24 October 2022	(Canada) Kennedy Faulknor	(United States) UCLA Bruins	Canberra United
24 October 2022	Adriana Konjarski	(Australia) Warners Bay	Newcastle Jets
26 October 2022	Sophie Harding	Newcastle Jets	Western Sydney Wanderers
26 October 2022	Cushla Rue	Wellington Phoenix	Western Sydney Wanderers
30 October 2022	(United States) Murphy Agnew	(Iceland) Þróttur	Newcastle Jets
31 October 2022	Bethany Gordon	Newcastle Jets	Western Sydney Wanderers
1 November 2022	(United States) Sarah Griffith	(United States) Chicago Red Stars	Newcastle Jets (loan)
1 November 2022	(New Zealand) Emma Rolston	(Norway) Avaldsnes IL	Wellington Phoenix
2 November 2022	(Sweden) Kajsa Lind	(Sweden) Vittsjö	Brisbane Roar (loan)
3 November 2022	Emma Checker	(Sweden) Umeå	Melbourne City (end of loan)
4 November 2022	(New Zealand) Katie Bowen	(United States) North Carolina Courage	Melbourne City
4 November 2022	(New Zealand) Milly Clegg	(New Zealand) Auckland United	Wellington Phoenix
4 November 2022	(China) Xiao Yuyi	(China) Shanghai Shengli	Adelaide United (loan)
4 November 2022	Sofia Christopherson	Canberra United Academy	Canberra United
6 November 2022	Elise Kellond-Knight	(Sweden) Hammarby	Melbourne Victory
8 November 2022	(United States) Emina Ekic	(United States) Racing Louisville	Melbourne City (loan)
9 November 2022	Madison McComasky	(Australia) Macarthur Rams	Canberra United
9 November 2022	Amy Chessari	(Australia) FNSW Institute	Western Sydney Wanderers
9 November 2022	Josie Allan	Newcastle Jets Academy	Newcastle Jets
10 November 2022	(China) Wu Chengshu	(China) Jiangsu Suning	Canberra United
11 November 2022	(Czech Republic) Jitka Chlastáková	Unattached	Western Sydney Wanderers
13 November 2022	Melissa Maizels	Melbourne Victory	Unattached
13 November 2022	Sophia Varley	Melbourne Victory	Unattached
14 November 2022	Heidi Dennis	Brisbane Roar	Unattached
14 November 2022	Lanni McDougall	Brisbane Roar	Unattached
14 November 2022	Cristina Esposito	Canberra United	Unattached
14 November 2022	Beth Mason-Jones	Canberra United	Unattached
14 November 2022	(United States) Ally Haran	Canberra United	Unattached
14 November 2022	Mikayla Vidmar	Canberra United	Unattached
14 November 2022	Alexia Karrys-Stahl	Canberra United	Unattached
14 November 2022	Ashleigh Sykes	Canberra United	Unattached
14 November 2022	Allira Toby	Canberra United	Unattached
14 November 2022	Sarah Carroll	Perth Glory	Unattached
14 November 2022	Lisa De Vanna	Perth Glory	Unattached
14 November 2022	Poppie Hooks	Perth Glory	Unattached
14 November 2022	Courtney Newbon	Perth Glory	Unattached
14 November 2022	(England) Gemma Craine	Perth Glory	Unattached
15 November 2022	(United States) Tess Boade	(United States) North Carolina Courage	Western Sydney Wanderers (loan)
17 November 2022	Natasha Brough	Adelaide United	Unattached
17 November 2022	Meleri Mullan	Adelaide United	Unattached
17 November 2022	(Japan) Reona Omiya	Adelaide United	Unattached
17 November 2022	Emma Stanbury	Adelaide United	Unattached
17 November 2022	Leia Varley	Adelaide United	Unattached
17 November 2022	Nia Stamatopoulos	Brisbane Roar	Unattached
17 November 2022	(Japan) Rie Kitano	Brisbane Roar	Unattached
17 November 2022	Meaghan McElligott	Brisbane Roar	Unattached
17 November 2022	Natasha Prior	Sydney FC	Unattached
17 November 2022	(Chile) María José Rojas (Note: Rojas spent the off-season at Apollon Ladies.)	Sydney FC	Melbourne City
18 November 2022	Teagan Thompson	(Australia) Lions FC	Brisbane Roar (loan)
18 November 2022	Tamar Levin	(Australia) Queensland Academy of Sport	Brisbane Roar
18 November 2022	Zara Kruger	(Australia) Lions FC	Brisbane Roar (loan)
18 November 2022	Sophie Magus	Newcastle Jets	Unattached
18 November 2022	Hannah Brewer	Newcastle Jets	Unattached
18 November 2022	Jemma House	Newcastle Jets	Unattached
19 November 2022	Annabel Martin	Wellington Phoenix	Unattached
19 November 2022	(New Zealand) Kelli Brown	Wellington Phoenix	Unattached
19 November 2022	Jordan Jasnos	Wellington Phoenix	Unattached
19 November 2022	Hannah Jones	Wellington Phoenix	Unattached

=== Mid-season ===
Date	Name	Moving from	Moving to
23 November 2022	Emily Kos	(Australia) Box Hill United	Melbourne Victory
23 November 2022	Remy Siemsen	(Sweden) AIK	Sydney FC
23 November 2022	Aimee Medwin	(United States) Long Beach State Beach	Western United
14 December 2022	Isabella Foletta	Unattached	Perth Glory
17 December 2022	(United States) Tess Boade	Western Sydney Wanderers	(United States) North Carolina Courage (end of loan)
17 December 2022	(Denmark) Rikke Madsen	(United States) North Carolina Courage	Melbourne Victory (loan)
26 December 2022	(Chile) María José Rojas	Melbourne City	Unattached
28 December 2022	(Philippines) Sarina Bolden	(Japan) Elfen Saitama	Western Sydney Wanderers
29 December 2022	Remy Siemsen	Sydney FC	(England) Leicester City
31 December 2022	Melissa Maizels	Unattached	Melbourne Victory
4 January 2023	(United States) Emina Ekic	Melbourne City	(United States) Racing Louisville (end of loan)
4 January 2023	(Canada) Danielle Steer	(Canada) UBC Thunderbirds	Western United
5 January 2023	Melissa Maizels	Melbourne Victory	Unattached
5 January 2023	Jasmine Black	Sydney FC	Unattached
5 January 2023	Tahlia Franco	Unattached	Sydney FC
6 January 2023	(Republic of Ireland) Sarah Rowe	(Australia) Collingwood (AFLW)	Melbourne Victory
9 January 2023	Angela Beard	(Denmark) Fortuna Hjørring	Western United
10 January 2023	Teigan Collister	Unattached	Sydney FC
10 January 2023	(United States) Rola Badawiya	(Australia) Sydney University	Sydney FC
10 January 2023	(New Zealand) Indiah-Paige Riley	(Denmark) Fortuna Hjørring	Brisbane Roar
12 January 2023	Teagan Thompson	Brisbane Roar	(Australia) Lions FC (end of loan)
15 January 2023	Charlotte Hrehoresin	(Australia) FV Emerging	Melbourne City
22 January 2023	(United States) Jessica McDonald	Western United	(United States) Racing Louisville (end of loan)
26 January 2023	(Argentina) Gaby Garton	Unattached	Melbourne Victory
26 January 2023	Charlotte Hrehoresin	Melbourne City	(Australia) FV Emerging
30 January 2023	(New Zealand) Hannah Blake	Unattached	Perth Glory
2 February 2023	(Denmark) Rikke Madsen	Melbourne Victory	(United States) North Carolina Courage (end of loan)
2 February 2023	(Argentina) Gaby Garton	Melbourne Victory	Unattached
6 February 2023	(China) Xiao Yuyi	Adelaide United	(China) Shanghai Shengli (end of loan)
9 February 2023	Tahlia Franco	Sydney FC	Unattached
10 February 2023	Kiera Meyers	Unattached	Melbourne City
11 February 2023	(Chile) María José Rojas	Unattached	Melbourne City
12 February 2023	(United States) Sarah Griffith	Newcastle Jets	(United States) Chicago Red Stars (end of loan)
15 February 2023	Alex Chidiac	Melbourne Victory	(United States) Racing Louisville (end of loan)
17 February 2023	Adriana Konjarski	Newcastle Jets	(Australia) Broadmeadow Magic
23 February 2023	(Republic of Ireland) Sarah Rowe	Melbourne Victory	(Republic of Ireland) Bohemians
24 February 2023	Chloe Logarzo	Western United	(United States) Kansas City Current (end of loan)
24 February 2023	Emily Roach	Canberra United	Newcastle Jets
24 February 2023	Renée Pountney	(United States) Creighton Bluejays	Newcastle Jets
26 February 2023	(New Zealand) Corina Brown	Unattached	Wellington Phoenix
28 February 2023	Tiana Jaber	Unattached	Western United
2 March 2023	Kiera Meyers	Melbourne City	Unattached
2 March 2023	Chelsie Dawber	Adelaide United	(United States) Chicago Red Stars (end of loan)
2 March 2023	(Denmark) Hannah Holgersen	Unattached	Adelaide United
2 March 2023	Erin Kontoutsikos	Unattached	Adelaide United
6 March 2023	(United States) Jordyn Bloomer	Western Sydney Wanderers	(United States) Racing Louisville (end of loan)
9 March 2023	Jasmine Black	Unattached	Sydney FC
10 March 2023	Abby Middleton	Adelaide United	(Australia) FSA NTC
10 March 2023	Chrissy Panagaris	(Australia) Adelaide Comets	Adelaide United
11 March 2023	(New Zealand) Corina Brown	Wellington Phoenix	Unattached
16 March 2023	Jasmine Black	Sydney FC	Unattached
16 March 2023	Margaux Chauvet	Sydney FC	Unattached
22 March 2023	Katrina Gorry	Brisbane Roar	(Sweden) Vittsjö (end of loan)
22 March 2023	(Sweden) Kajsa Lind	Brisbane Roar	(Sweden) Vittsjö (end of loan)
24 March 2023	(New Zealand) Emma Main	Unattached	Wellington Phoenix
24 March 2023	Chloe Logarzo	Unattached	Western United
28 March 2023	Larissa Crummer	Brisbane Roar	(Norway) Brann

== Re-signings ==
Date	Name	Club
21 March 2022	(England) Fiona Worts (Note: Worts spent the off-season at LSK Kvinner.)	Adelaide United
24 March 2022	(Japan) Nanako Sasaki (Note: Player signed a two-year extension.)	Adelaide United
24 March 2022	Ella Tonkin	Adelaide United
24 May 2022	Natasha Rigby	Perth Glory
25 May 2022	(New Zealand) Elizabeth Anton	Perth Glory
25 May 2022	(United States) Cyera Hintzen	Perth Glory
26 May 2022	Abbey Green	Perth Glory
26 May 2022	Isabella Wallhead	Perth Glory
27 May 2022	Sarah Cain	Perth Glory
27 May 2022	Aideen Keane	Perth Glory
27 May 2022	Demi Koulizakis	Perth Glory
27 May 2022	Sadie Lawrence	Perth Glory
27 May 2022	Susan Phonsongkham (Note: Phonsongkham spent the off-season at KR Reykjavik.)	Perth Glory
22 June 2022	Kim Carroll	Perth Glory
27 June 2022	Emma Ilijoski	Canberra United
1 July 2022	Sasha Grove	Canberra United
11 July 2022	Hayley Taylor-Young	Canberra United
13 July 2022	(New Zealand) Mackenzie Barry	Wellington Phoenix
18 July 2022	Chloe Lincoln	Canberra United
18 July 2022	(New Zealand) Alyssa Whinham	Wellington Phoenix
21 July 2022	(New Zealand) Lily Alfeld	Wellington Phoenix
26 July 2022	(New Zealand) Kate Taylor	Wellington Phoenix
27 July 2022	(New Zealand) Brianna Edwards	Wellington Phoenix
27 July 2022	Ayesha Norrie (Note: Norrie spent the off-season at Lions FC.)	Brisbane Roar
29 July 2022	(New Zealand) Chloe Knott	Wellington Phoenix
29 July 2022	Hollie Palmer (Note: Palmer spent the off-season at Capalaba FC.)	Brisbane Roar
4 August 2022	Isabel Gomez	Wellington Phoenix
4 August 2022	(United States) Shea Connors (Note: Connors spent the off-season at APIA Leichhardt.)	Brisbane Roar
5 August 2022	Polly Doran (Note: Player signed a three-year extension.)	Melbourne Victory
5 August 2022	Larissa Crummer (Note: Crummer spent the off-season at Capalaba FC.)	Brisbane Roar
10 August 2022	Michelle Heyman	Canberra United
11 August 2022	Annalee Grove	Adelaide United
11 August 2022	Dylan Holmes	Adelaide United
12 August 2022	Isabel Hodgson	Adelaide United
12 August 2022	Paige Hayward	Adelaide United
12 August 2022	(Brazil) Mariel Hecher (Note: Hecher spent the off-season at Lions FC.)	Brisbane Roar
17 August 2022	Holly McQueen	Brisbane Roar
18 August 2022	Katrina Gorry (Note: Gorry spent the off-season at Vittsjö.)	Brisbane Roar
19 August 2022	Cassidy Davis	Newcastle Jets
30 August 2022	Lara Gooch	Newcastle Jets
31 August 2022	Isabella Shuttleworth (Note: Shuttleworth spent the off-season at Moreton Bay United.)	Brisbane Roar
1 September 2022	Taren King	Newcastle Jets
1 September 2022	Clare Hunt	Western Sydney Wanderers
2 September 2022	(New Zealand) Grace Wisnewski	Wellington Phoenix
5 September 2022	(United States) Kayla Morrison	Melbourne Victory
5 September 2022	Amy Jackson	Melbourne Victory
5 September 2022	Alana Murphy	Melbourne Victory
5 September 2022	Maja Markovski	Melbourne Victory
5 September 2022	Tiffany Eliadis	Melbourne Victory
6 September 2022	(New Zealand) Zoe McMeeken	Wellington Phoenix
6 September 2022	Casey Dumont	Melbourne Victory
7 September 2022	(New Zealand) Claudia Bunge	Melbourne Victory
8 September 2022	(New Zealand) Ava Pritchard	Wellington Phoenix
8 September 2022	Lia Privitelli	Melbourne Victory
9 September 2022	Keeley Richards	Canberra United
9 September 2022	Jamilla Rankin	Brisbane Roar
9 September 2022	(United States) Catherine Zimmerman	Melbourne Victory
13 September 2022	Annabel Haffenden (Note: Haffenden spent the off-season at Växjö.)	Brisbane Roar
12 September 2022	Olivia Price	Western Sydney Wanderers
12 September 2022	Claire Coelho	Newcastle Jets
13 September 2022	Natalie Tobin	Sydney FC
13 September 2022	Princess Ibini	Sydney FC
13 September 2022	Mackenzie Hawkesby	Sydney FC
13 September 2022	Rachel Lowe	Sydney FC
13 September 2022	Sarah Hunter	Sydney FC
13 September 2022	Charlize Rule	Sydney FC
13 September 2022	Charlotte McLean	Sydney FC
13 September 2022	Katie Offer	Sydney FC
13 September 2022	Shay Hollman	Sydney FC
13 September 2022	Mary Stanic-Floody	Sydney FC
14 September 2022	Emilia Murray	Adelaide United
14 September 2022	Sheridan Gallagher	Western Sydney Wanderers
15 September 2022	Kaitlyn Torpey	Melbourne City
15 September 2022	Grace Maher	Canberra United
16 September 2022	Mia Bailey	Brisbane Roar
16 September 2022	(New Zealand) Saskia Vosper	Wellington Phoenix
19 September 2022	Lucy Johnson	Newcastle Jets
21 September 2022	Grace Wilson	Adelaide United
22 September 2022	Rhianna Pollicina	Melbourne City
22 September 2022	Danika Matos	Western Sydney Wanderers
23 September 2022	Ella Abdul Massih	Western Sydney Wanderers
23 September 2022	Cortnee Vine	Sydney FC
23 September 2022	Jada Whyman	Sydney FC
25 September 2022	Taylor Ray	Sydney FC
27 September 2022	Tara Andrews	Newcastle Jets
27 September 2022	Melissa Barbieri	Melbourne City
30 September 2022	(New Zealand) Hannah Wilkinson	Melbourne City
1 October 2022	Ash Brodigan	Newcastle Jets
6 October 2022	Sally James	Melbourne City
6 October 2022	Caitlin Karic	Melbourne City
6 October 2022	Lauren Allan	Newcastle Jets
11 October 2022	(New Zealand) Malia Steinmetz	Western Sydney Wanderers
12 October 2022	Laura Hughes	Canberra United
21 October 2022	(New Zealand) Te Reremoana Walker	Wellington Phoenix
21 October 2022	(New Zealand) Charlotte Lancaster	Wellington Phoenix
25 October 2022	Chloe Middleton	Canberra United
26 October 2022	Josie Morley	Newcastle Jets
27 October 2022	Jessie Rasschaert (Note: Rasschaert spent the off-season at Gold Coast United.)	Brisbane Roar
1 November 2022	Chelsie Dawber (Note: Dawber spent the off-season at Chicago Red Stars, before returning to Adelaide United on loan.)	Adelaide United
4 November 2022	Isabella Accardo	Melbourne City
10 November 2022	Alexia Apostolakis	Western Sydney Wanderers
18 November 2022	Aleeah Davern	Brisbane Roar
23 November 2022	Sham Khamis (Note: Khamis spent the off-season at Macarthur Rams.)	Western Sydney Wanderers
9 February 2023	(Republic of Ireland) Sarah Rowe	Melbourne Victory
