= 2022–23 A-League Women =

Fifteenth edition of the top Australian women's football (soccer) league

A-League Women
- Season: 2022–23
- Dates: 18 November 2022 – 30 April 2023
- Champions: Sydney FC (4th title)
- Premiers: Sydney FC (5th title)
- AFC Club Championship: Sydney FC
- Matches: 101
- Goals: 303 (3 per match)
- Top goalscorer: Hannah Keane (13 goals)
- Biggest home win: Wellington Phoenix 5–0 Canberra United (22 January 2023)
- Biggest away win: Newcastle Jets 0–6 Western United (26 February 2023)
- Highest scoring: Melbourne Victory 3–6 Sydney FC (26 January 2023)
- Longest winning run: 7 matches Western United
- Longest unbeaten run: 7 matches Western United
- Longest winless run: 9 matches Adelaide United
- Longest losing run: 5 matches Wellington Phoenix
- Highest attendance: 8,838; Melbourne Victory 2–2 Adelaide United (26 February 2023)
- Lowest attendance: 201; WS Wanderers 3–1 Brisbane Roar (19 March 2023)
- Attendance: 126,194 (1,249 per match)
- All statistics correct as of 22 April 2023. (Note: Longest runs only include regular season results)

The 2022–23 A-League Women, known as the Liberty A-League for sponsorship reasons, was the fifteenth season of the A-League Women, the Australian national women's soccer competition.

Western United joined as an expansion club, taking the total number of teams to 11.

Sydney FC were the defending premiers and Melbourne Victory the defending champions. Sydney FC won the regular season for the third consecutive time.

== Clubs ==
=== Stadiums and locations ===
| Team | Location | Stadium | Capacity |
|---|---|---|---|
| Adelaide United | Adelaide | ServiceFM Stadium; Coopers Stadium | 5,000; 16,500 |
| Brisbane Roar | Brisbane | Suncorp Stadium; Lions Stadium; Moreton Daily Stadium | 52,500; 5,000; 11,500 |
| Canberra United | Canberra | McKellar Park | 3,500 |
| Melbourne City | Melbourne | Frank Holohan Soccer Complex | 2,000 |
| Melbourne Victory | Melbourne | AAMI Park; Epping Stadium; CB Smith Reserve | 30,050; 10,000; 2,000 |
| Newcastle Jets | Newcastle | Newcastle Number 2 Sports Ground; McDonald Jones Stadium | 5,000; 33,000 |
| Perth Glory | Perth | Macedonia Park | 7,000 |
| Sydney FC | Sydney | Jubilee Oval; Leichhardt Oval | 20,505; 20,000 |
| Wellington Phoenix | Wellington | Sky Stadium | 34,500 |
| Western Sydney Wanderers | Sydney | Marconi Stadium; CommBank Stadium; Wanderers Football Park | 9,000; 30,000; 1,000 |
| Western United | Wyndham | City Vista Pavilion and Sports Field | 4,000 |

=== Personnel and kits ===
| Team | Manager | Captain | Kit manufacturers | Kit sponsors |
|---|---|---|---|---|
| Adelaide United | (Australia) Adrian Stenta | (Australia) Isabel Hodgson | UCAN | Kite |
| Brisbane Roar | (Australia) Garrath McPherson | (Australia) Ayesha Norrie | New Balance | Ausenco |
| Canberra United | (Australia) Njegosh Popovich | (Australia) Michelle Heyman | ISC Sport | University of Canberra |
| Melbourne City | (Australia) Dario Vidošić (caretaker) | (Australia) Emma Checker | Puma | Etihad Airways |
| Melbourne Victory | (Wales) Jeff Hopkins | (United States) Kayla Morrison | Macron | MATE |
| Newcastle Jets | (Australia) Gary van Egmond | (Australia) Cassidy Davis | Legend Sportswear | Port of Newcastle |
| Perth Glory | (Australia) Alexander Epakis | (Australia) Natasha Rigby | Macron | Gold Valley |
| Sydney FC | (Australia) Ante Juric | (Australia) Natalie Tobin | Under Armour | The Star |
| Wellington Phoenix | (England) Natalie Lawrence | (New Zealand) Lily Alfeld | Paladin Sports | Oppo; Spark (Note: Away kit) |
| Western Sydney Wanderers | (Australia) Kat Smith | (Australia) Clare Hunt | Kappa | Intermain |
| Western United | (Australia) Mark Torcaso | (Philippines) Jaclyn Sawicki | Kappa | Sharp |

=== Managerial changes ===
| Team | Outgoing manager | Manner of departure | Date of vacancy | Position on table | Incoming manager | Date of appointment |
|---|---|---|---|---|---|---|
| Canberra United | (Australia) Vicki Linton | Resigned | 21 March 2022 | Pre-season | (Australia) Njegosh Popovic | 18 May 2022 |
| Western Sydney Wanderers | (Australia) Catherine Cannuli | Resigned | 7 May 2022 | Pre-season | (Australia) Kat Smith | 18 May 2022 |
| Western United | Inaugural manager | | | Pre-season | (Australia) Mark Torcaso | 29 June 2022 |
| Wellington Phoenix | (Wales) Gemma Lewis | Signed by Wales | 12 September 2022 | Pre-season | (England) Natalie Lawrence | 12 September 2022 |
| Melbourne City | (Australia) Rado Vidošić | Signed by Melbourne City Men | 23 November 2022 | 1st | (Australia) Dario Vidošić (caretaker) | 23 November 2022 |
| Newcastle Jets | (Australia) Ash Wilson | Resigned | 2 February 2023 | 10th | (Australia) Gary van Egmond (caretaker) | 2 February 2023 |
| Newcastle Jets | (Australia) Gary van Egmond (caretaker) | Promoted to full-time | 21 March 2023 | 10th | (Australia) Gary van Egmond | 21 March 2023 |

=== Foreign players ===
| Club | Visa 1 | Visa 2 | Visa 3 | Visa 4 | Non-Visa foreigner(s) | Former player(s) |
|---|---|---|---|---|---|---|
| Adelaide United | (Denmark) Hannah Holgersen | (England) Fiona Worts | (Japan) Nanako Sasaki | (Netherlands) Maruschka Waldus | | (China) Xiao Yuyi |
| Brisbane Roar | (France) Margot Robinne | (United States) Shea Connors | (United States) Hensley Hancuff | | (Brazil) Mariel Hecher^{B} (New Zealand) Indiah-Paige Riley^{A} | (Sweden) Kajsa Lind |
| Canberra United | (Canada) Kennedy Faulknor | (China) Wu Chengshu | (New Zealand) Grace Jale | | (Serbia) Vesna Milivojević^{A} | |
| Melbourne City | (Chile) María José Rojas | (New Zealand) Katie Bowen | (New Zealand) Hannah Wilkinson | (United States) Julia Grosso | | (United States) Emina Ekic |
| Melbourne Victory | (New Zealand) Claudia Bunge | (United States) Catherine Zimmerman | | | (United States) Kayla Morrison^{B} | (Argentina) Gaby Garton^{B} (Denmark) Rikke Madsen^{R} (Republic of Ireland) Sarah Rowe^{B} |
| Newcastle Jets | (United States) Murphy Agnew | (United States) Cannon Clough | (United States) Emily Garnier | | | (United States) Sarah Griffith |
| Perth Glory | (New Zealand) Elizabeth Anton | (United States) Rylee Baisden | (United States) Gabriella Coleman | (United States) Cyera Hintzen | (New Zealand) Hannah Blake^{R} | |
| Sydney FC | (New Zealand) Anna Green | (United States) Rola Badawiya | (United States) Madison Haley | | (Republic of Ireland) Deborah-Anne De la Harpe^{A} | |
| Wellington Phoenix | | | | | | |
| Western Sydney Wanderers | (Czech Republic) Jitka Chlastáková | (New Zealand) Malia Steinmetz | (Philippines) Sarina Bolden | | | (United States) Jordyn Bloomer (United States) Tess Boade |
| Western United | (Guyana) Sydney Cummings | (Philippines) Jaclyn Sawicki | (United States) Hillary Beall | (United States) Hannah Keane | (Canada) Danielle Steer^{B} (Philippines) Angela Beard^{A} (Serbia) Tyla-Jay Vlajnic^{A} | (United States) Jessica McDonald^{G} |

The following do not fill a Visa position:
- ^{A} Australian citizens who have chosen to represent another national team
- ^{B} Those players who were born and started their professional career abroad but have since gained Australian citizenship
- ^{G} Guest players
- ^{R} Injury replacement players, or national team replacement players

== Regular season ==
=== League table ===
| Pos | Team | Pld | W | D | L | GF | GA | GD | Pts | Qualification |
|---|---|---|---|---|---|---|---|---|---|---|
| 1 | Sydney FC (C) | 18 | 13 | 1 | 4 | 43 | 15 | +28 | 40 | Qualification to Finals series and 2023 AFC Women's Club Championship |
| 2 | Western United (Note: The APL awarded Western United a 3–0 win as a result of Brisbane Roar fielding an ineligible player, after the round 17 match had originally finished 2–0 for Brisbane.) | 18 | 13 | 0 | 5 | 38 | 20 | +18 | 39 | Qualification to Finals series |
| 3 | Melbourne City | 18 | 9 | 3 | 6 | 36 | 23 | +13 | 30 | Qualification to Finals series |
| 4 | Melbourne Victory | 18 | 7 | 8 | 3 | 29 | 22 | +7 | 29 | Qualification to Finals series |
| 5 | Canberra United | 18 | 8 | 5 | 5 | 35 | 30 | +5 | 29 | |
| 6 | Perth Glory | 18 | 8 | 4 | 6 | 31 | 26 | +5 | 28 | |
| 7 | Western Sydney Wanderers | 18 | 5 | 4 | 9 | 16 | 23 | −7 | 19 | |
| 8 | Adelaide United | 18 | 5 | 3 | 10 | 16 | 29 | −13 | 18 | |
| 9 | Brisbane Roar | 18 | 4 | 6 | 8 | 16 | 31 | −15 | 18 | |
| 10 | Newcastle Jets | 18 | 4 | 2 | 12 | 22 | 53 | −31 | 14 | |
| 11 | Wellington Phoenix | 18 | 3 | 4 | 11 | 20 | 30 | −10 | 13 | |

Source: A-Leagues
Rules for classification: 1) points; 2) goal difference; 3) number of goals scored.
(C) Champions

=== Matches ===
- All times are in AEDT (UTC+11:00) until 1 April 2023, AEST (UTC+10:00) afterwards.

==== Round 1 ====
| 19 November 2022 | Canberra United | 2–2 | Perth Glory | Canberra |
| 15:00 | Jale 12'; Milivojević 41' | Report | Anton 35'; Coleman 64' | Stadium: McKellar Park; Attendance: 1,263; Referee: Casey Reibelt |

| 19 November 2022 | Brisbane Roar | 2–1 | Newcastle Jets | Brisbane |
| 15:00 | Crummer 31'; Freier 39' | Report | Agnew 76' (pen.) | Stadium: Perry Park; Attendance: 1,327; Referee: Kate Jacewicz |

| 19 November 2022 | Western United | 1–0 | Melbourne Victory | Melbourne |
| 15:00 | McDonald 54' | Report | | Stadium: City Vista Recreation Reserve; Attendance: 2,753; Referee: Lara Lee |

| 20 November 2022 | Wellington Phoenix | 1–4 | Melbourne City | Wellington, New Zealand |
| 13:00 | Torpey 82' (o.g.) | Report | Henry 48'; Rojas 50'; Pollicina 65' (pen.), 69' | Stadium: Sky Stadium; Attendance: 5,213; Referee: Anna-Marie Keighley |

| 20 November 2022 | Adelaide United | 1–0 | Sydney FC | Adelaide |
| 16:00 | Murray 88' | Report | | Stadium: ServiceFM Stadium; Attendance: 1,039; Referee: Georgia Ghirardello |

==== Round 2 ====
| 26 November 2022 | Wellington Phoenix | 1–4 | Western United | Wellington, New Zealand |
| 13:00 | Van der Meer 23' | Report | McDonald 16'; Cummings 71'; Keane 77', 82' | Stadium: Sky Stadium; Attendance: 1,541; Referee: Bec Mackie |

| 26 November 2022 | Newcastle Jets | 4–2 | Western Sydney Wanderers | Tamworth |
| 15:00 | Griffith 12', 36', 58'; Andrews 67' | Report | Caceres 19'; Harrison 76' | Stadium: Scully Park; Attendance: 2,078; Referee: Kelly Jones |

| 26 November 2022 | Brisbane Roar | 1–1 | Canberra United | Brisbane |
| 15:00 | Crummer 53' | Report | Jale 23' | Stadium: Perry Park; Attendance: 1,115; Referee: Rachael Mitchenson |

| 26 November 2022 | Sydney FC | 2–0 | Melbourne Victory | Sydney |
| 15:00 | Haley 41'; Dumont 48' (o.g.) | Report | | Stadium: Cromer Park; Attendance: 1,339; Referee: Georgia Ghirardello |

| 27 November 2022 | Perth Glory | 0–1 | Adelaide United | Perth |
| 19:00 | | Report | Holmes 19' | Stadium: Macedonia Park; Attendance: 1,264; Referee: Rebecca Durcau |

==== Round 3 ====
| 3 December 2022 | Western Sydney Wanderers | 0–1 | Sydney FC | Sydney |
| 15:00 | | Report | Siemsen 82' | Stadium: Marconi Stadium; Attendance: 626; Referee: Casey Reibelt |

| 3 December 2022 | Melbourne City | 3–0 | Brisbane Roar | Melbourne |
| 15:00 | Henry 30'; Rojas 51'; Ekic 80' | Report | | Stadium: Casey Fields; Attendance: 670; Referee: Isabella Blaess |

| 3 December 2022 | Newcastle Jets | 2–2 | Perth Glory | Newcastle |
| 15:00 | L. Allan 54'; Brodigan 77' | Report | Baisden 42', 58' | Stadium: Newcastle Number 2 Sports Ground; Attendance: 1,230; Referee: Caitlin Williams |

| 4 December 2022 | Adelaide United | 1–2 | Western United | Adelaide |
| 16:00 | Dawber 56' | Report | Cummings 90+1'; Robers 90+7' | Stadium: ServiceFM Stadium; Attendance: 1,013; Referee: Lara Lee |

| 4 December 2022 | Melbourne Victory | 1–0 | Wellington Phoenix | Melbourne |
| 16:00 | Ayres 50' | Report | | Stadium: Epping Stadium; Attendance: 589; Referee: Kate Jacewicz |

==== Round 4 ====
| 10 December 2022 | Canberra United | 3–0 | Wellington Phoenix | Canberra |
| 15:00 | Maher 9'; Heyman 27', 53' | Report | | Stadium: McKellar Park; Attendance: 1,430; Referee: Isabella Libri |

| 10 December 2022 | Melbourne City | 5–1 | Newcastle Jets | Melbourne |
| 15:00 | Torpey 6'; Worth 27' (o.g.); Henry 29'; Karic 78'; Ekic 81' (pen.) | Report | Andrews 70' | Stadium: Casey Fields; Attendance: 347; Referee: Rebecca Durcau |

| 10 December 2022 | Sydney FC | 4–0 | Brisbane Roar | Sydney |
| 17:10 | Haley 33', 43'; Hunter 90+1'; Siemsen 90+3' | Report | | Stadium: Allianz Stadium; Attendance: 4,293; Referee: Anna-Marie Keighley |

| 11 December 2022 | Western Sydney Wanderers | 0–1 | Adelaide United | Sydney |
| 16:00 | | Report | Dawber 7' (pen.) | Stadium: Wanderers Football Park; Attendance: 423; Referee: Georgia Ghirardello |

| 11 December 2022 | Perth Glory | 0–3 | Melbourne Victory | Perth |
| 19:00 | | Report | Ayres 25', 58'; Chidiac 75' | Stadium: Macedonia Park; Attendance: 700; Referee: Lara Lee |

==== Round 5 ====
| 17 December 2022 | Wellington Phoenix | 0–1 | Adelaide United | Wellington, New Zealand |
| 15:40 | | Report | Barry 22' (o.g.) | Stadium: Sky Stadium; Attendance: 4,535; Referee: Isabella Blaess |

| 17 December 2022 | Brisbane Roar | 1–0 | Western Sydney Wanderers | Brisbane |
| 17:00 | Palmer 9' | Report | | Stadium: A.J. Kelly Park; Attendance: 877; Referee: Bec Mackie |

| 17 December 2022 | Melbourne City | 1–3 | Western United | Melbourne |
| 17:05 | Ekic 28' | Report | A. Taranto 2'; Logarzo 64', 90+6' (pen.) | Stadium: AAMI Park; Attendance: 5,392; Referee: Kate Jacewicz |

| 18 December 2022 | Melbourne Victory | 5–2 | Newcastle Jets | Melbourne |
| 18:15 | Ayres 6' (pen.), 8'; Morrison 19', 25', 87' | Report | Griffith 59'; Brodigan 72' | Stadium: AAMI Park; Attendance: 417; Referee: Casey Reibelt |

| 18 December 2022 | Perth Glory | 3–2 | Canberra United | Perth |
| 19:00 | Baisden 47', 69'; Hintzen 53' | Report | Flannery 13'; Milivojević 34' | Stadium: Macedonia Park; Attendance: 611; Referee: Kelly Jones |

==== Round 6 ====
| 23 December 2022 | Canberra United | 0–4 | Melbourne City | Queanbeyan |
| 18:00 | | Report | Pollicina 28', 55'; Rojas 69'; Galic 88' | Stadium: Seiffert Oval; Attendance: 1,009; Referee: Georgia Ghirardello |

| 23 December 2022 | Newcastle Jets | 0–2 | Brisbane Roar | Newcastle |
| 18:00 | | Report | Gorry 10', 60' | Stadium: Newcastle Number 2 Sports Ground; Attendance: 987; Referee: Isabella Libri |

| 24 December 2022 | Sydney FC | 2–0 | Western Sydney Wanderers | Sydney |
| 14:25 | Hawkesby 30' (pen.); Vine 34' | Report | | Stadium: Allianz Stadium; Attendance: 1,071; Referee: Rebecca Durcau |

==== Round 7 ====
| 27 December 2022 | Melbourne City | 1–0 | Perth Glory | Melbourne |
| 20:15 | Ekic 60' (pen.) | Report | | Stadium: AAMI Park; Attendance: 4,341; Referee: Bec Mackie |

| 8 February 2023 | Western United | 0–2 | Newcastle Jets | Ballarat |
| 17:30 | | Report | King 38'; Brodigan 47' | Stadium: Morshead Park; Attendance: 320; Referee: Isabella Libri |

| 28 March 2023 | Adelaide United | 1–3 | Wellington Phoenix | Adelaide |
| 19:00 | Worts 21' | Report | Knott 19'; Clegg 75', 90+6' | Stadium: ServiceFM Stadium; Attendance: 694; Referee: Isabella Blaess |

==== Round 8 ====
| 31 December 2022 | Brisbane Roar | 1–4 | Sydney FC | Brisbane |
| 15:00 | Norrie 44' | Report | Ibini 13'; Hunter 23'; Haley 37'; Tobin 52' | Stadium: A.J. Kelly Park; Attendance: 992; Referee: Georgia Ghirardello |

| 31 December 2022 | Melbourne Victory | 1–0 | Canberra United | Melbourne |
| 15:00 | Chidiac 44' | Report | | Stadium: CB Smith Reserve; Attendance: 412; Referee: Isabella Blaess |

| 31 December 2022 | Newcastle Jets | 2–0 | Adelaide United | Newcastle |
| 15:00 | L. Allan 61', 88' | Report | | Stadium: Newcastle Number 2 Sports Ground; Attendance: 879; Referee: Lara Lee |

| 1 January 2023 | Perth Glory | 2–3 | Western United | Perth |
| 19:00 | Baisden 7'; Lowry 53' | Report | Keane 17'; Logarzo 67'; Koulizakis 86' (o.g.) | Stadium: Macedonia Park; Attendance: 700; Referee: Caitlin Williams |

| 2 January 2023 | Wellington Phoenix | 1–1 | Western Sydney Wanderers | Wellington, New Zealand |
| 10:20 | Robertson 41' | Report | Gallagher 60' | Stadium: Sky Stadium; Attendance: 1,943; Referee: Anna-Marie Keighley |

==== Round 9 ====
| 6 January 2023 | Melbourne Victory | 1–1 | Perth Glory | Melbourne |
| 17:05 | Zois 26' | Report | Jancevski 74' | Stadium: AAMI Park; Attendance: 973; Referee: Kelly Jones |

| 7 January 2023 | Western United | 1–0 | Wellington Phoenix | Melbourne |
| 15:00 | Vlajnic 78' | Report | | Stadium: City Vista Recreation Reserve; Attendance: 630; Referee: Rebecca Durcau |

| 7 January 2023 | Newcastle Jets | 2–4 | Sydney FC | Newcastle |
| 15:00 | Konjarski 10'; Andrews 48' | Report | Haley 1'; Hunter 4'; Hawkesby 7'; Ibini 64' (pen.) | Stadium: Newcastle Number 2 Sports Ground; Attendance: 1,024; Referee: Anna-Marie Keighley |

| 7 January 2023 | Adelaide United | 0–2 | Canberra United | Adelaide |
| 19:30 | | Report | Heyman 28'; Maher 31' | Stadium: ServiceFM Stadium; Attendance: 853; Referee: Casey Reibelt |

| 8 January 2023 | Western Sydney Wanderers | 2–0 | Melbourne City | Sydney |
| 16:00 | Gallagher 40'; Price 55' | Report | | Stadium: Wanderers Football Park; Attendance: 466; Referee: Lara Lee |

==== Round 10 ====
| 11 January 2023 | Western United | 2–0 | Sydney FC | Melbourne |
| 17:00 | Keane 18', 35' | Report | | Stadium: City Vista Recreation Reserve; Attendance: 740; Referee: Kate Jacewicz |

| 11 January 2023 | Adelaide United | 0–3 | Melbourne City | Adelaide |
| 19:00 | | Report | Galic 47'; McKenna 90+2'; Karic 90+5' | Stadium: ServiceFM Stadium; Attendance: 803; Referee: Isabella Blaess |

| 14 January 2023 | Canberra United | 5–1 | Newcastle Jets | Canberra |
| 15:00 | Heyman 16', 52'; Wu Chengshu 27'; Brush 78'; Milivojević 90+3' | Report | Andrews 80' | Stadium: McKellar Park; Attendance: 1,023; Referee: Lara Lee |

| 14 January 2023 | Western Sydney Wanderers | 2–1 | Western United | Sydney |
| 15:00 | Bolden 12'; Harrison 53' | Report | Keane 26' | Stadium: Wanderers Football Park; Attendance: 448; Referee: Kelly Jones |

| 15 January 2023 | Brisbane Roar | 1–1 | Adelaide United | Brisbane |
| 16:00 | Riley 26' | Report | Dawber 47' (pen.) | Stadium: A.J. Kelly Park; Attendance: 932; Referee: Bec Mackie |

| 15 January 2023 | Melbourne City | 1–1 | Melbourne Victory | Melbourne |
| 17:00 | Wilkinson 37' | Report | Chidiac 13' | Stadium: Casey Fields; Attendance: 506; Referee: Georgia Ghirardello |

| 15 January 2023 | Perth Glory | 2–0 | Wellington Phoenix | Perth |
| 19:00 | Hintzen 6'; Phonsongkham 14' (pen.) | Report | | Stadium: Macedonia Park; Attendance: 700; Referee: Casey Reibelt |

==== Round 11 ====
| 18 January 2023 | Western Sydney Wanderers | 0–0 | Melbourne Victory | Sydney |
| 18:00 | | Report | | Stadium: Wanderers Football Park; Attendance: 436; Referee: Isabella Libri |

| 21 January 2023 | Western United | 2–0 | Brisbane Roar | Hobart |
| 14:20 | Keane 45+2'; Vlajnic 56' | Report | | Stadium: North Hobart Oval; Attendance: 2,050; Referee: Georgia Ghirardello |

| 21 January 2023 | Melbourne City | 1–0 | Western Sydney Wanderers | Melbourne |
| 15:00 | Wilkinson 14' | Report | | Stadium: Casey Fields; Attendance: 247; Referee: Bec Mackie |

| 21 January 2023 | Adelaide United | 1–2 | Melbourne Victory | Adelaide |
| 16:00 | Worts 8' | Report | Chidiac 51'; Morrison 85' | Stadium: ServiceFM Stadium; Attendance: 1,006; Referee: Rebecca Durcau |

| 22 January 2023 | Wellington Phoenix | 5–0 | Canberra United | Wellington, New Zealand |
| 10:15 | Clegg 43'; Hassett 45', 83'; Pritchard 46'; Ilijoski 88' (o.g.) | Report | | Stadium: Sky Stadium; Attendance: 2,044; Referee: Anna-Marie Keighley |

| 29 March 2023 | Sydney FC | 4–2 | Perth Glory | Sydney |
| 19:00 | I. Dos Santos 25'; Vine 45+2'; Haley 75'; Ibini 89' | Report | Jancevski 45' (pen.); Coleman 58' | Stadium: Netstrata Jubilee Stadium; Attendance: 414; Referee: Casey Reibelt |

==== Round 12 ====
| 26 January 2023 | Melbourne Victory | 3–6 | Sydney FC | Melbourne |
| 16:05 | Madsen 42'; Privitelli 45+3'; Markovski 88' (pen.) | Report | Ibini 24', 36', 60'; Hawkesby 30'; Haley 45+5'; Vine 48' | Stadium: AAMI Park; Attendance: 1,307; Referee: Casey Reibelt |

| 28 January 2023 | Canberra United | 0–5 | Western United | Canberra |
| 15:00 | | Report | Steer 5'; M. Taranto 13'; Keane 28', 39'; Cummings 42' | Stadium: McKellar Park; Attendance: 970; Referee: Rebecca Durcau |

| 28 January 2023 | Western Sydney Wanderers | 1–0 | Newcastle Jets | Sydney |
| 17:30 | Price 36' | Report | | Stadium: Wanderers Football Park; Attendance: 326; Referee: Isabella Blaess |

| 29 January 2023 | Brisbane Roar | 3–3 | Wellington Phoenix | Brisbane |
| 16:00 | Connors 14'; Gorry 28'; Crummer 86' | Report | Foster 33'; Clegg 66'; Wisnewski 78' | Stadium: A.J. Kelly Park; Attendance: 753; Referee: Kelly Jones |

| 29 January 2023 | Melbourne City | 1–0 | Adelaide United | Melbourne |
| 17:40 | Pollicina 54' | Report | | Stadium: AAMI Park; Attendance: 595; Referee: Lara Lee |

==== Round 13 ====
| 4 February 2023 | Sydney FC | 3–0 | Melbourne City | Sydney |
| 14:20 | Hunter 27'; Vine 47'; Haley 71' | Report | | Stadium: Allianz Stadium; Attendance: 3,654; Referee: Rebecca Durcau |

| 4 February 2023 | Melbourne Victory | 3–1 | Western Sydney Wanderers | Melbourne |
| 15:00 | Goad 4'; Chidiac 82' (pen.); Eliadis 90+7' | Report | Harding 15' | Stadium: CB Smith Reserve; Attendance: 511; Referee: Georgia Ghirardello |

| 4 February 2023 | Western United | 1–3 | Perth Glory | Ballarat |
| 15:00 | Robers 22' | Report | Phonsongkham 11' (pen.); Jancevski 73'; Blake 90+6' | Stadium: Morshead Park; Attendance: 545; Referee: Caitlin Williams |

| 5 February 2023 | Adelaide United | 0–1 | Brisbane Roar | Adelaide |
| 16:00 | | Report | Rasschaert 78' | Stadium: ServiceFM Stadium; Attendance: 1,045; Referee: Bec Mackie |

| 5 February 2023 | Newcastle Jets | 0–3 | Canberra United | Newcastle |
| 16:00 | | Report | Hughes 63'; Heyman 65'; Maher 70' (pen.) | Stadium: Newcastle Number 2 Sports Ground; Attendance: 1,404; Referee: Rachael Mitchenson |

==== Round 14 ====
| 11 February 2023 | Western United | 2–1 | Melbourne City | Melbourne |
| 14:20 | Keane 48'; Cummings 86' (pen.) | Report | McKenna 40' | Stadium: AAMI Park; Attendance: 1,150; Referee: Anna-Marie Keighley |

| 11 February 2023 | Brisbane Roar | 1–1 | Melbourne Victory | Brisbane |
| 15:00 | Connors 22' | Report | Chidiac 21' (pen.) | Stadium: Perry Park; Attendance: 767; Referee: Rachael Mitchenson |

| 11 February 2023 | Canberra United | 2–1 (Note: The APL awarded Sydney FC a 3–0 win as a result of Canberra United making an illegal fourth substitution, after the match had originally finished 2–1 for Canberra. A few weeks later, the decision was overturned following an appeal by Canberra.) | Sydney FC | Canberra |
| 17:00 | Heyman 4'; Brush 87' | Report | Badawiya 53' | Stadium: McKellar Park; Attendance: 943; Referee: Kelly Jones |

| 12 February 2023 | Western Sydney Wanderers | 1–0 | Wellington Phoenix | Sydney |
| 15:00 | Harding 40' | Report | | Stadium: Wanderers Football Park; Attendance: 313; Referee: Bec Mackie |

| 12 February 2023 | Perth Glory | 4–0 | Newcastle Jets | Perth |
| 19:00 | Sakalis 15' (pen.); Foletta 41'; Hintzen 67', 90+7' | Report | | Stadium: Macedonia Park; Attendance: 839; Referee: Georgia Ghirardello |

==== Round 15 ====
| 25 February 2023 | Canberra United | 3–0 | Western Sydney Wanderers | Canberra |
| 15:00 | Heyman 4', 25'; Grove 54' | Report | | Stadium: McKellar Park; Attendance: 920; Referee: Georgia Ghirardello |

| 25 February 2023 | Perth Glory | 2–0 | Brisbane Roar | Perth |
| 19:00 | Lowry 22', 31' | Report | | Stadium: Macedonia Park; Attendance: 680; Referee: Isabella Libri |

| 26 February 2023 | Wellington Phoenix | 0–1 | Sydney FC | Auckland, New Zealand |
| 11:00 | | Report | Lowe 47' | Stadium: North Harbour Stadium; Attendance: 1,182; Referee: Rachael Mitchenson |

| 26 February 2023 | Newcastle Jets | 0–6 | Western United | Newcastle |
| 16:00 | | Report | Johnson 6', 34'; Vlajnic 38', 44'; Steer 55'; Keane 78' | Stadium: Newcastle Number 2 Sports Ground; Attendance: 910; Referee: Bec Mackie |

| 26 February 2023 | Melbourne Victory | 2–2 | Adelaide United | Melbourne |
| 17:35 | Ayres 6'; Zimmerman 71' | Report | Westland 17'; Dawber 27' | Stadium: AAMI Park; Attendance: 8,838; Referee: Rebecca Durcau |

==== Round 16 ====
| 4 March 2023 | Canberra United | 4–2 | Adelaide United | Canberra |
| 15:00 | Maher 4' (pen.); Heyman 11', 30', 76' | Report | Bowler 20'; Waldus 32' | Stadium: McKellar Park; Attendance: 1,003; Referee: Isabella Libri |

| 4 March 2023 | Newcastle Jets | 0–4 | Melbourne City | Newcastle |
| 15:00 | | Report | Rojas 25'; Pollicina 80'; Henry 82'; Wilkinson 90+3' | Stadium: Newcastle Number 2 Sports Ground; Attendance: 940; Referee: Kelly Jones |

| 4 March 2023 | Wellington Phoenix | 1–1 | Brisbane Roar | Wellington, New Zealand |
| 15:40 | Van der Meer 26' | Report | Connors 80' | Stadium: Sky Stadium; Attendance: 2,574; Referee: Anna-Marie Keighley |

| 5 March 2023 | Sydney FC | 3–0 | Western United | Sydney |
| 16:00 | Lowe 51', 64'; Ibini 81' | Report | | Stadium: Netstrata Jubilee Stadium; Attendance: 566; Referee: Lara Lee |

| 5 March 2023 | Perth Glory | 1–1 | Western Sydney Wanderers | Perth |
| 19:00 | Rigby 54' | Report | Harrison 80' (pen.) | Stadium: Macedonia Park; Attendance: 656; Referee: Isabella Blaess |

==== Round 17 ====
| 11 March 2023 | Adelaide United | 2–1 | Perth Glory | Adelaide |
| 15:00 | Aquino 52' (o.g.); Worts 70' | Report | Blake 49' | Stadium: ServiceFM Stadium; Attendance: 975; Referee: Bec Mackie |

| 11 March 2023 | Brisbane Roar | 0–3; Awarded (Note: The APL awarded Western United a 3–0 win as a result of Brisbane Roar fielding an ineligible player, after the match had originally finished 2–0 for Brisbane.) | Western United | Brisbane |
| 15:00 | Connors 18', 90+2' | Report | | Stadium: Perry Park; Attendance: 751; Referee: Georgia Ghirardello |

| 11 March 2023 | Sydney FC | 0–1 | Wellington Phoenix | Sydney |
| 15:00 | | Report | Taylor 32' | Stadium: Netstrata Jubilee Stadium; Attendance: 518; Referee: Caitlin Williams |

| 12 March 2023 | Western Sydney Wanderers | 1–1 | Canberra United | Sydney |
| 16:00 | Price 25' | Report | Milivojević 35' | Stadium: Wanderers Football Park; Attendance: 263; Referee: Lara Lee |

| 13 March 2023 | Melbourne Victory | 2–0 | Melbourne City | Melbourne |
| 15:20 | Ayres 16' (pen.); Zois 20' | Report | | Stadium: AAMI Park; Attendance: 1,655; Referee: Isabella Blaess |

==== Round 18 ====
| 17 March 2023 | Adelaide United | 2–2 | Newcastle Jets | Adelaide |
| 17:05 | Bowler 52'; Murray 88' | Report | Johnson 19'; L. Allan 29' | Stadium: Coopers Stadium; Attendance: 2,292; Referee: Georgia Ghirardello |

| 18 March 2023 | Melbourne City | 1–1 | Sydney FC | Melbourne |
| 15:00 | Torpey 90+4' | Report | Vine 24' | Stadium: Casey Fields; Attendance: 463; Referee: Anna-Marie Keighley |

| 18 March 2023 | Canberra United | 1–1 | Melbourne Victory | Canberra |
| 15:00 | Faulknor 72' | Report | Eliadis 88' | Stadium: McKellar Park; Attendance: 1,204; Referee: Rebecca Durcau |

| 18 March 2023 | Wellington Phoenix | 0–1 | Perth Glory | Wellington, New Zealand |
| 15:00 | | Report | Hintzen 10' | Stadium: Sky Stadium; Attendance: 850; Referee: Isabella Libri |

| 19 March 2023 | Western Sydney Wanderers | 3–1 | Brisbane Roar | Sydney |
| 19:00 | Gordon 32', 79'; Hunt 42' | Report | Crummer 49' | Stadium: Wanderers Football Park; Attendance: 201; Referee: Rachael Mitchenson |

==== Round 19 ====
| 25 March 2023 | Newcastle Jets | 3–2 | Wellington Phoenix | Newcastle |
| 15:00 | L. Allan 38'; Brodigan 64'; Davis 82' | Report | Van der Meer 26'; Satchell 26' | Stadium: Newcastle Number 2 Sports Ground; Attendance: 606; Referee: Rebecca Durcau |

| 25 March 2023 | Sydney FC | 3–0 | Adelaide United | Sydney |
| 15:00 | Lowe 14'; Tobin 67'; Hawkesby 79' | Report | | Stadium: Netstrata Jubilee Stadium; Attendance: 441; Referee: Rachael Mitchenson |

| 25 March 2023 | Western United | 0–3 | Canberra United | Melbourne |
| 15:00 | | Report | Milivojević 1', 65'; Wu 74' | Stadium: City Vista Recreation Reserve; Attendance: 404; Referee: Isabella Blaess |

| 26 March 2023 | Melbourne Victory | 1–1 | Brisbane Roar | Melbourne |
| 16:00 | Ayres 37' (pen.) | Report | Connors 29' | Stadium: CB Smith Reserve; Attendance: 521; Referee: Bec Mackie |

| 26 March 2023 | Perth Glory | 4–3 | Melbourne City | Perth |
| 18:00 | Lawrence 70'; Blake 71'; Lowry 81'; Hintzen 87' | Report | Pollicina 33'; Wilkinson 74'; Grosso 90+1' | Stadium: Macedonia Park; Attendance: 910; Referee: Kelly Jones |

==== Round 20 ====
| 1 April 2023 | Wellington Phoenix | 2–2 | Melbourne Victory | Wellington, New Zealand |
| 10:15 | Pritchard 75'; Wisnewski 90+9' | Report | Murphy 4'; Ayres 26' | Stadium: Sky Stadium; Referee: Georgia Ghirardello |

| 1 April 2023 | Brisbane Roar | 0–1 | Perth Glory | Brisbane |
| 15:00 | | Report | Coleman 72' | Stadium: Perry Park; Attendance: 854; Referee: Anna-Marie Keighley |

| 1 April 2023 | Western United | 2–1 | Western Sydney Wanderers | Melbourne |
| 15:00 | Keane 23', 55' | Report | Saveska 80' | Stadium: City Vista Recreation Reserve; Attendance: 361; Referee: Rebecca Durcau |

| 1 April 2023 | Sydney FC | 4–0 | Newcastle Jets | Sydney |
| 17:05 | Hawkesby 16', 78'; Vine 90+1', 90+5' | Report | | Stadium: Allianz Stadium; Attendance: 1,338; Referee: Isabella Blaess |

| 2 April 2023 | Melbourne City | 3–3 | Canberra United | Melbourne |
| 17:40 | Wilkinson 12'; Pollicina 34'; McNamara 59' | Report | Jale 14'; Milivojević 80', 88' | Stadium: AAMI Park; Attendance: 1,416; Referee: Rachael Mitchenson |

== Finals series ==
On 12 December 2022, the Australian Professional Leagues announced that the Grand Final would be hosted in Sydney for this season a move which received considerable backlash.

=== Bracket ===
Semi-finals
1 | Sydney FC | 0
2 | Western United | 1
3 | Melbourne City | 3 (1)
4 | Melbourne Victory (p) | 3 (4)

Preliminary final
1 | Sydney FC | 1
4 | Melbourne Victory | 0

Grand final
2 | Western United | 0
1 | Sydney FC | 4

=== Semi-finals ===
| 15 April 2023 Elimination final | Melbourne City | 3–3 (a.e.t.) (1–4 p) | Melbourne Victory | Melbourne |
| 15:00 | Pollicina 40', 79'; Wilkinson 90+7' | Report | Ayres 53' (pen.), 67', 72' | Stadium: Casey Fields; Attendance: 742; Referee: Lara Lee |
| | Penalties |
| | Bowen (penalty missed); Pollicina (penalty scored); Wilkinson (penalty missed) | | (penalty scored) Dumont; (penalty scored) Ayres; (penalty scored) Markovski; (penalty scored) Murphy |

| 16 April 2023 Qualifying final | Sydney FC | 0–1 | Western United | Sydney |
| 17:45 | | Report | Keane 26' | Stadium: Allianz Stadium; Attendance: 3,680; Referee: Georgia Ghirardello |

=== Preliminary final ===
| 22 April 2023 | Sydney FC | 1–0 | Melbourne Victory | Sydney |
| 15:00 | Haley 89' | Report | | Stadium: Allianz Stadium; Attendance: 1,630; Referee: Isabella Blaess |

=== Grand final ===
| 30 April 2023 | Western United | 0–4 | Sydney FC | Sydney |
| 16:00 | | Report | Haley 4', 90+1'; Tobin 18'; Ibini 63' (pen.) | Stadium: CommBank Stadium; Attendance: 9,519; Referee: Casey Reibelt |

== Regular season statistics ==
=== Top scorers ===
| Rank | Player | Club | Goals |
|---|---|---|---|
| 1 | (United States) Hannah Keane | Western United | 13 |
| 2 | (Australia) Michelle Heyman | Canberra United | 12 |
| 3 | (Australia) Melina Ayres | Melbourne Victory | 9 |
| 4 | (United States) Madison Haley | Sydney FC | 8 |
| 4 | (Serbia) Vesna Milivojević | Canberra United | 8 |
| 4 | (Australia) Rhianna Pollicina | Melbourne City | 8 |
| 7 | (Australia) Princess Ibini-Isei | Sydney FC | 7 |
| 7 | (Australia) Cortnee Vine | Sydney FC | 7 |
| 9 | (Australia) Alex Chidiac | Melbourne Victory | 6 |
| 9 | (United States) Shea Connors | Brisbane Roar | 6 |
| 9 | (Australia) Mackenzie Hawkesby | Sydney FC | 6 |
| 9 | (United States) Cyera Hintzen | Perth Glory | 6 |

=== Hat-tricks ===
| Player | For | Against | Result | Date | Ref. |
|---|---|---|---|---|---|
| (United States) Sarah Griffith | Newcastle Jets | Western Sydney Wanderers | 4–2 (H) | 26 November 2022 | |
| (United States) Kayla Morrison | Melbourne Victory | Newcastle Jets | 5–2 (H) | 18 December 2022 | |
| (Australia) Princess Ibini-Isei | Sydney FC | Melbourne Victory | 6–2 (A) | 26 January 2023 | |
| (Australia) Michelle Heyman | Canberra United | Adelaide United | 4–2 (H) | 4 March 2023 | |

Key
| (A) | Away team |
| (H) | Home team |

=== Clean sheets ===
| Rank | Player | Club | Clean sheets |
|---|---|---|---|
| 1 | (Australia) Jada Mathyssen-Whyman | Sydney FC | 8 |
| 2 | (United States) Hillary Beall | Western United | 6 |
| 3 | (Australia) Melissa Barbieri | Melbourne City | 5 |
| 3 | (Australia) Casey Dumont | Melbourne Victory | 5 |
| 3 | (United States) Jordyn Bloomer | Western Sydney Wanderers | 5 |
| 6 | (Australia) Annalee Grove | Adelaide United | 4 |
| 6 | (United States) Hensley Hancuff | Brisbane Roar | 4 |
| 6 | (Australia) Chloe Lincoln | Canberra United | 4 |
| 9 | (Australia) Morgan Aquino | Perth Glory | 3 |
| 9 | (Australia) Sally James | Melbourne City | 3 |

== End-of-season awards ==
The following awards were announced at the 2022–23 Dolan Warren Awards night that took place on 1 June 2023.

- Julie Dolan Medal – Alex Chidiac (Melbourne Victory)
- Young Player of the Year – Sarah Hunter (Sydney FC)
- Golden Boot Award – Hannah Keane (Western United) (13 goals)
- Goalkeeper of the Year – Hillary Beall (Western United)
- Coach of the Year – Mark Torcaso (Western United)
- Referee of the Year – Casey Reibelt
- Fair Play Award – Canberra United
- Goal of the Year – Madison Haley (Sydney FC v Brisbane Roar, 10 December 2022)

=== Club awards ===
| Club | Player of the Season | Ref. |
|---|---|---|
| Adelaide United | (Australia) Dylan Holmes | |
| Brisbane Roar | (United States) Shea Connors | |
| Canberra United | (Australia) Michelle Heyman | |
| Melbourne City | (United States) Julia Grosso | |
| Melbourne Victory | (Australia) Beattie Goad | |
| Newcastle Jets | (United States) Emily Garnier | |
| Perth Glory | (United States) Cyera Hintzen | |
| Sydney FC | (Australia) Natalie Tobin | |
| Wellington Phoenix | (New Zealand) Michaela Foster | |
| Western Sydney Wanderers | (Australia) Clare Hunt | |
| Western United | (United States) Hillary Beall | |

== See also ==
- 2022–23 A-League Men
- A-League Women transfers for 2022–23 season
- 2022–23 Adelaide United FC (women) season
- 2022–23 Brisbane Roar FC (women) season
- 2022–23 Canberra United FC (women) season
- 2022–23 Melbourne City FC (women) season
- 2022–23 Melbourne Victory FC (women) season
- 2022–23 Newcastle Jets FC (women) season
- 2022–23 Perth Glory FC (women) season
- 2022–23 Sydney FC (women) season
- 2022–23 Wellington Phoenix FC (women) season
- 2022–23 Western Sydney Wanderers FC (women) season
- 2022–23 Western United FC (women) season
