= Johanna Andersson =

Swedish footballer

Personal information
- Full name: Johanna Andersson
- Date of birth: 7 October 1989 (age 37)
- Place of birth: Sweden
- Position: Midfielder

Senior career*
Years	Team	Apps	(Gls)
2011–2020	Vittsjö GIK	194	(6)
- * Club domestic league appearances and goals as of 18:50, 14 July 2019 (UTC)

Johanna Andersson (born 7 October 1989) is a Swedish footballer who played for Vittsjö GIK.
