= Daniela Galić =

Australian soccer player (born 2006)

Personal information
- Date of birth: 17 June 2006 (age 20)
- Place of birth: Sydney, New South Wales, Australia
- Height: 1.67 m (5 ft 6 in)
- Positions: Midfielder; forward

Team information
- Current team: Vittsjö
- Number: 24

Youth career
- 2017–2021: Football NSW Institute

Senior career*
Years	Team	Apps	(Gls)
2022–2024	Melbourne City	39	(9)
2024–2025	Twente	2	(0)
2025–	Vittsjö	36	(11)

International career^{‡}
2022–	Australia U-20	21	(7)
2022–	Australia U-23	6	(0)
2024–	Australia	6	(1)
- * Club domestic league appearances and goals as of 2 November 2026 ‡ National team caps and goals as of 13 October 2026

Daniela Galić (Croatian: [dǎni(j)e(ː)la ɡǎːlitɕ] da-NEEY-ela GAHL-ich; born 17 June 2006) is an Australian soccer player who plays as a midfielder or forward for Damallsvenskan club Vittsjö GIK and for the Australia national team. Widely regarded as one of the best young talents in Australian women's soccer, she is normally deployed as an attacking midfielder, though can also play as a striker or a winger.

Born in Sydney, she graduated from the Football NSW Institute before moving to Melbourne and being signed by A-League Women club Melbourne City. She later moved to Vrouwen Eredivisie club FC Twente before moving to Damallsvenskan club Vittsjö GIK to seek more game time. She has also represented Australia at under-20 and under-23 level.

== Early life ==
Galić was born in 2006 in Sydney, and is of Croatian descent. She acknowledges her parents as inspirations to take up soccer; both had played for Lidcombe Waratahs, "her mother as a defensive midfielder, and her father as a striker". Galić began playing soccer at Lidcombe as a seven-year-old. Modelling her style of play off Dutch striker Vivianne Miedema, at 17 her ambitions were "to play professionally in a team overseas. To play in a World Cup. Win trophies. Play in the Champions League and win trophies."

== Club career ==
=== Melbourne City ===
In October 2022, Galić signed her professional contract for Melbourne City. In her first season, she made 17 appearances and scored 2 goals.

In July 2024, Galić left Melbourne City to pursue an opportunity overseas.

=== Twente ===
A few weeks after leaving Melbourne City, it was announced Galić joined Vrouwen Eredivisie club Twente, signing a two-year contract.

On 26 September 2024, Galić scored her first goal for Twente in a 4–0 win over Croatian side Osijek in the second round of qualifiers for the 2024–25 UEFA Women's Champions League. The 8–1 aggregate win over Osijek meant that Twente had qualified for the Champions League, being the only Dutch team to do so after Ajax failed to qualify.

=== Vittsjö ===
On 14 July 2025, Galić signed for Damallsvenskan club Vittsjö GIK during the 2025 season, where she was described as the "successor" to fellow Australian and former Vittsjö player Katrina Gorry. She made her competitive debut on 10 August 2025 in a 2–1 win at home over Piteå IF, in which she picked up a yellow card. The following week on 17 August 2025, she scored her first goal for the club, scoring the equaliser in a 1–1 away draw with Djurgårdens IF. She finished the season with four goals and three assists (all in the league) in 17 appearances (14 in the league and four in the Svenska Cupen).

Galić remained at Vittsjö for the 2026 season. She scored her first brace for the club on 5 September 2026, scoring two headers in a 5–0 home victory over IK Uppsala. She finished the season with nine goals (eight in the league and one in the cup) and four assists (all in the league) in 26 games (25 in the league and one in the cup).

== International career ==
In August 2022, Galić joined Australia U-20 (Young Matildas) squad for the 2022 FIFA U-20 Women's World Cup held in Costa Rica. She participated in all three group stage games, against Costa Rica, Brazil and Spain, and providing one assist. For the Costa Rica match she was awarded Player of the Match. The Young Matildas finished third in their group and were eliminated.

In October 2024, Galić received her first senior call up to the Australian national team's squad by interim head coach Tom Sermanni. She made her debut in a 1–1 draw against Switzerland on 25 October, coming on as a substitute in the 78th minute. Described as "renowned for her clever footwork and creative vision on the field" by ABC News' Isha Singhal. The midfielder was praised for her "attacking flair and versatility" by former Matilda, Grace Gill. In February 2025 she represented Australia at the invitational SheBelieves Cup in the United States. She was substituted on during a 4–0 loss against Japan in Houston.

Galić returned to the national team setup when she was selected by head coach Joe Montemurro as part of a 26-player squad named for two friendlies against Germany in Karlsruhe and Haiti in Chambly, France on 9 and 13 October 2026, respectively. Montemurro praised her impressive performances at club level, explicitly describing her alongside Hana Lowry and Alana Murphy as "the next generation of midfielders" in a press conference. She came on as a substitute in a 7–1 victory over Haiti, scoring her first international goal. She described the goal as being "special".

== Career statistics ==
=== Club ===
As of 17 November 2026

Appearances and goals by club, season and competition
Club	Season	League			Cup (Note: Includes the KNVB Women's Cup and the Svenska Cupen)		Continental (Note: Includes the UEFA Women's Champions League (UWCL))		Total	
Club	Season	Division	Apps	Goals	Apps	Goals	Apps	Goals	Apps	Goals
Melbourne City	2022–23	A-League Women	17	2	—		—		17	2
Melbourne City	2023–24	A-League Women	22	7	—		—		22	7
Melbourne City	Total		39	9	0	0	0	0	39	9
Twente	2024–25	Vrouwen Eredivisie	2	0	0	0	7	1	9	1
Twente	Total		2	0	0	0	7	1	9	1
Vittsjö GIK	2025	Damallsvenskan	13	4	4	0	—		17	4
Vittsjö GIK	2026	Damallsvenskan	25	8	1	1	—		26	8
Vittsjö GIK	Total		40	12	5	1	0	0	43	13
Career total			77	21	5	1	7	1	89	22

=== International ===
As of match played 13 October 2026

Appearances and goals by national team and year
National team	Year	Apps	Goals
Australia	2024	4	0
Australia	2025	1	0
Australia	2026	1	1
Total		6	1

Scores and results list Australia's goal tally first, score column indicates score after each Galić goal.

List of international goals scored by Daniela Galić
No.	Date	Venue	Opponent	Score	Result	Competition
1.	13 October 2026	Stade Walter-Luzi, Chambly, France	Haiti	5–1	7–1	Friendly

== Honours ==
Individual

- A-League Women: Young Footballer of the Year: (2023-2024).
- 2022 FIFA U-20 Women's World Cup: Costa Rica U20 (hosts) vs Australia U20: Player of the Match.

== Personal life ==
Galić is close friends with national team and former Melbourne City teammate Alexia Apostolakis, who she is roommates with for national team camps. Apostolakis has described her as being like "family".
