= Lisa Klinga =

Swedish footballer (born 1991)

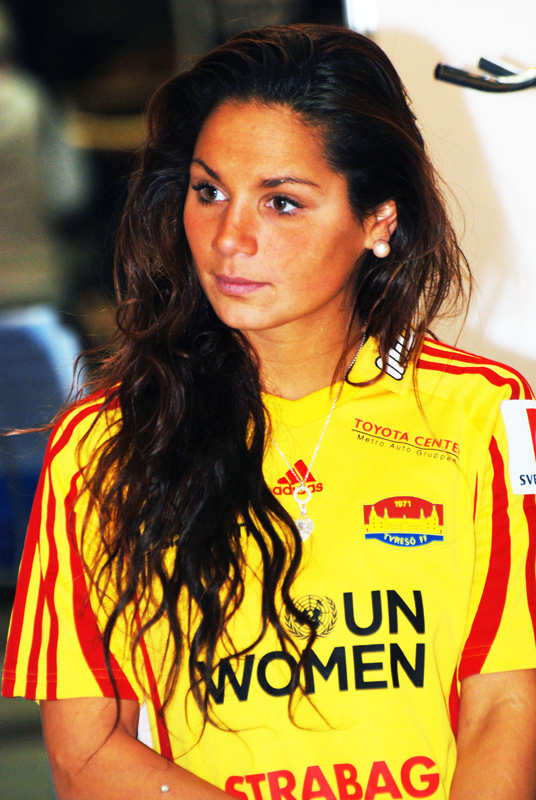

Personal information
- Full name: Elisabet Klinga
- Date of birth: 5 April 1991 (age 35)
- Place of birth: Sweden
- Height: 1.64 m (5 ft 4 1/2 in)
- Positions: Midfielder; striker; defender

Team information
- Current team: Vittsjö GIK
- Number: 9

Youth career
- Hanvikens SK
- Tyresö FF

Senior career*
Years	Team	Apps	(Gls)
2010	Tyresö FF	19	(1)
2011	Linköping	16	(0)
2012–2014	Tyresö FF	15	(0)
2013	→ Piteå IF (loan)	17	(1)
2014	Avaldsnes IL	7	(0)
2015–	Vittsjö GIK	162	(2)
- * Club domestic league appearances and goals as of 22:00,7 August 2022 (UTC)

Elisabet "Lisa" Klinga (born 5 April 1991) is a Swedish footballer who plays as an attacking midfielder for Damallsvenskan club Vittsjö GIK. She previously played for Tyresö FF and Piteå IF on loan. She has played in the Champions League with Linköpings FC. She previously represented Sweden on the under-19 national team.
