= Hensley Hancuff =

American soccer player (born 2000)

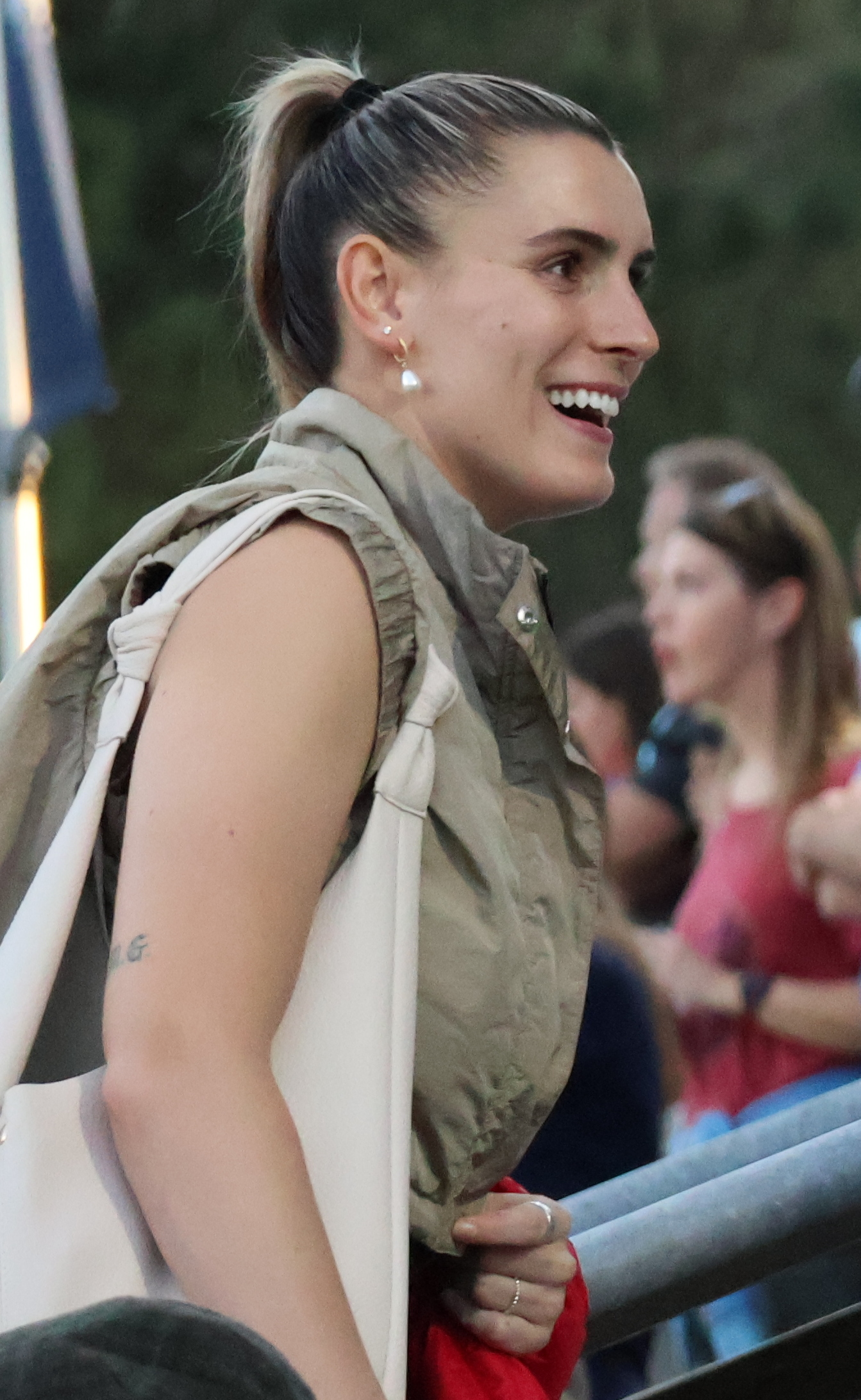
- Hancuff with the North Carolina Courage in 2024

Personal information
- Full name: Hensley Elaine Hancuff
- Date of birth: August 3, 2000 (age 26)
- Place of birth: Edmond, Oklahoma, U.S.
- Height: 1.90 m (6 ft 3 in)
- Position: Goalkeeper

College career
Years	Team	Apps	(Gls)
2018–2019	Villanova Wildcats	18	(0)
2020–2021	Clemson Tigers	27	(0)

Senior career*
Years	Team	Apps	(Gls)
2022–2023	NJ/NY Gotham FC	0	(0)
2022–2023	→ Brisbane Roar (loan)	16	(0)
2023–2025	North Carolina Courage	0	(0)
2023	→ Växjö DFF (loan)	4	(0)

International career
2017	United States U18		
2018–2019	United States U20	4	(0)
- * Club domestic league appearances and goals as of June 27, 2023

Hensley Elaine Hancuff (born August 3, 2000) is an American former professional soccer goalkeeper. She played college soccer for the Villanova Wildcats and the Clemson Tigers. She was drafted by NJ/NY Gotham FC in the third round of the 2022 NWSL Draft and was also a member of the North Carolina Courage. She played professionally during loan spells with the Brisbane Roar in Australia and Växjö DFF in Sweden.

== Early life ==
Hancuff was born and raised in Edmond, Oklahoma, where she performed gymnastics as a child. She attended Edmond North High School as a freshman and sophomore, transferred to Edmond Memorial High School to attempt to graduate early from high school, and later finished her studies with Epic Charter Schools, an online charter school. Her online studies also allowed her to accept an invitation to train with the Orlando Pride, a professional team in the National Women's Soccer League. As a youth player, she was invited to the Olympic Development Program national pool.

When Hancuff was 17, she was diagnosed with two ovarian tumours, and had to undergo an oophorectomy through laparoscopic surgery as a result. She recovered from the surgery in time to report to Villanova University, where she had committed to attend as a soccer player during her junior year of high school.

== College career ==
=== Villanova Wildcats (2018–2019) ===
Hancuff played 1,547 minutes in goal for the Wildcats across 18 appearances, making 74 saves while conceding 19 goals. She broke a finger during her sophomore year, ending her season, at which point she entered the NCAA transfer portal and transferred to Clemson University.

=== Clemson Tigers (2020–2022) ===
At Clemson, Hancuff trained under goalkeeping coach Siri Mullinix, a former United States international goalkeeper.

Hancuff played 2,693 minutes in goal for the Tigers across 27 appearances, making 95 saves while conceding 27 goals. Her 0.79 career goals-against average in her junior season, in which Clemson reached the quarterfinals of the 2020 College Cup, was the fifth-best in program history as of February 2023.

== Club career ==
=== NJ/NY Gotham FC (2022–2023) ===
During her youth career, Hancuff met Scott Parkinson, who coached youth soccer in Oklahoma. Parkinson would later draft Hancuff with the 34th overall pick in the third round of the 2022 NWSL Draft as manager of NJ/NY Gotham FC.

On March 15, 2022, Gotham FC signed Hancuff to a one-year contract with an option for a second year. She served as third-string goalkeeper behind Ashlyn Harris, who Hancuff had previously trained with at Orlando Pride, and Michelle Betos, and became the backup goalkeeper after an injury to Harris during the 2022 season.

On April 26, 2023, Hancuff was waived by Gotham, having not made a single competitive appearance for the club.

=== Brisbane Roar (loan, 2022–2023) ===
After the 2022 season, Gotham loaned Hancuff to A-League Women club Brisbane Roar for the duration of its 2022–23 season.

Hancuff made her professional debut for the Australian side on November 18, 2022, making three saves in a 2–1 win over Newcastle Jets. She played all 1,440 minutes in goal for the Brisbane Roar's 16-match A-League season, making 72 saves while conceding 22 goals. On May 3, 2023, she was voted as Player's Player of the Year, becoming the third American player to win the award after Celeste Boureille and Maddy Evans.

=== North Carolina Courage (2023–2025) ===
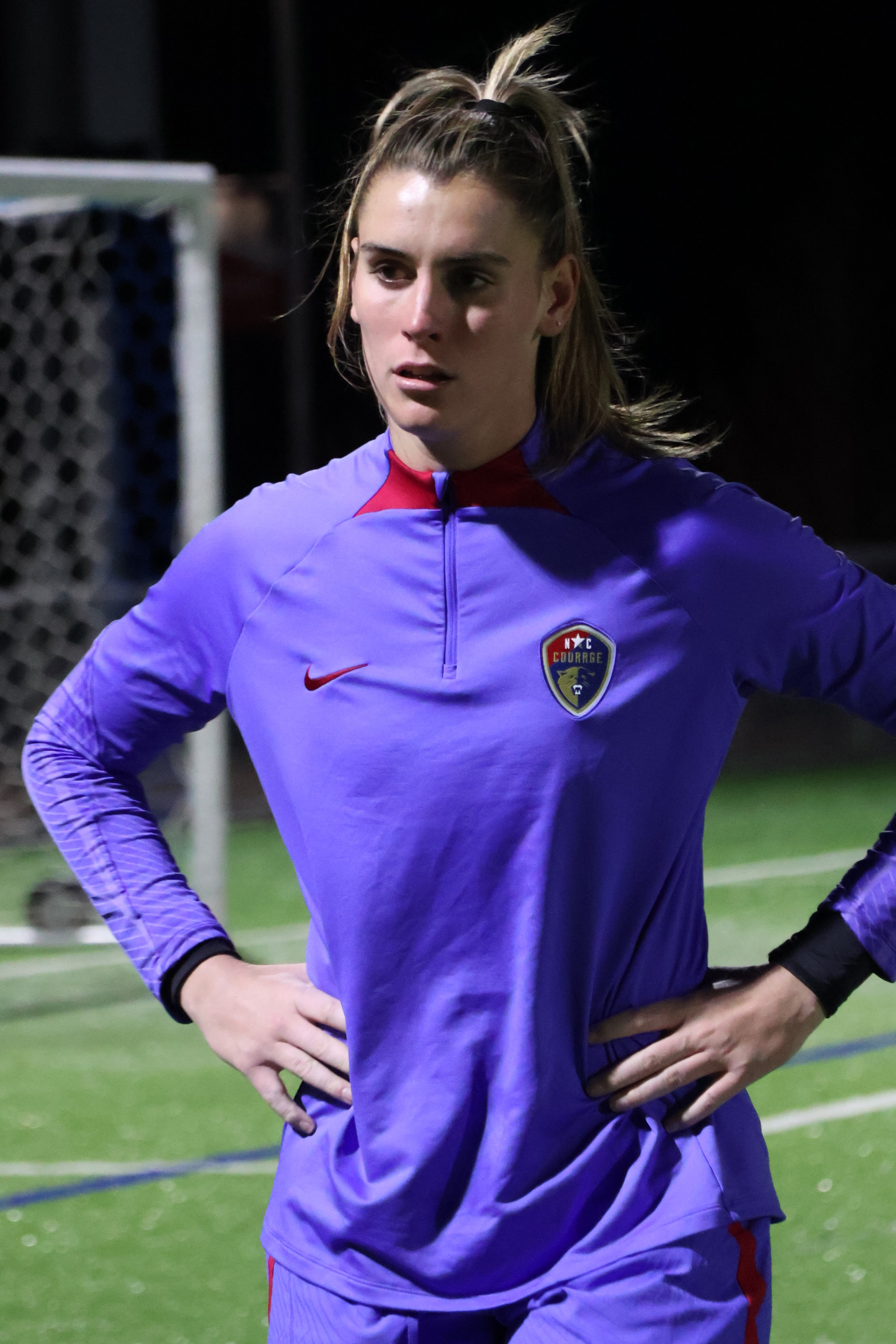
Hancuff training with the Courage in 2024

On June 27, 2023, the North Carolina Courage signed Hancuff to a short-term national team replacement contract.

North Carolina announced on May 14, 2025, that Hancuff had decided to retire from professional soccer to pursue other opportunities.

== International career ==
Hancuff was called into the United States under-16, under-17, under-18, under-19, under-20, and under-23 teams. With the under-20 team, Hancuff recorded a 1–0 shutout of China in a friendly match on December 10, 2018. She also started for the under-23 team in a 1–1 draw against France's under-23 team on February 20, 2023.

== Honors ==
Individual

- All-Big East Freshman Team: 2018
- Brisbane Roar FC Player's Player of the Year: 2022
