= Kayla Morrison =

American soccer player

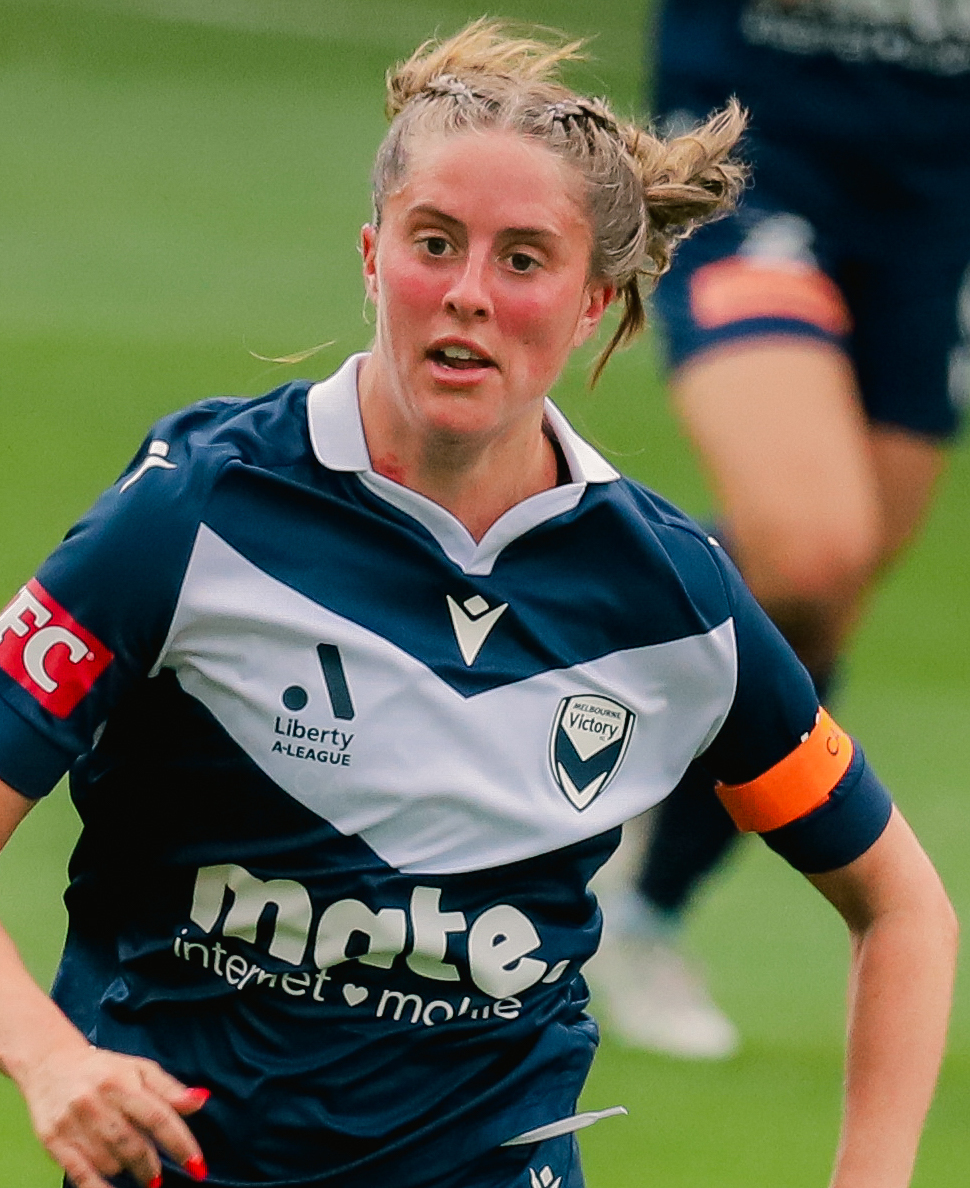
- Morrison with Melbourne Victory in 2023

Personal information
- Full name: Kayla Ann Morrison
- Date of birth: August 5, 1996 (age 30)
- Place of birth: Corona, California, United States
- Height: 5 ft 9 in (1.75 m)
- Position: Defender

Team information
- Current team: Melbourne Victory
- Number: 18

College career
Years	Team	Apps	(Gls)
2013–2017	Kansas Jayhawks	83	(3)

Senior career*
Years	Team	Apps	(Gls)
2018–2019	Bulleen Lions		(13)
2020	Morön	24	(5)
2020–2023	Melbourne Victory	35	(6)
2023	Portland Thorns	0	(0)
2023–	Melbourne Victory	32	(4)
- * Club domestic league appearances and goals as of 8 January 2025

Kayla Ann Morrison (born August 5, 1996) is an American-born Australian professional women's soccer player who plays as a defender for Melbourne Victory in the A-League Women. She has previously played college football for Kansas Jayhawks and professionally for Australian club Bulleen Lions, Swedish club Morön, and for American club Portland Thorns. With Melbourne Victory she played in the team's 2021 W-League grand final championship win and captained the team.

== Youth career ==
Morrison attended Corona High School, where she competed in volleyball, soccer, and track. As a soccer player, she scored 90 goals, and as a senior captained the team and was named its most valuable player.

She also played club soccer for seven years with Legends FC, where she played as a midfielder and won the 2012 U15 US Youth Soccer National Championship.

== College career ==
Morrison played for Kansas Jayhawks from 2013. In October 2017, Morrison became the first Kansas Jayhawk ever named Big 12 Conference Defender of the Year, sharing the award with Amandine Pierre-Louis. She majored in communications.

== Club career ==
=== FC Bulleen Lions, 2018–2020 ===
Morrison signed with the National Premier Leagues Victoria Women (NPLVW) side of FC Bulleen Lions in 2018. The Lions won the NPLW Championship, the club's first, and she was awarded the NPLVW Media Player of the Year award. Morrison won Media Player of the Year a second time in 2019, sharing with fellow American Catherine Zimmerman of Calder United SC. In her two seasons with the club, Morrison scored 13 goals.

=== Morön BK, 2020 ===
Due to the impact of the COVID-19 pandemic on sports, the NPLW cancelled its 2020 season. Morrison signed with Swedish club Morön BK of the Elitettan in 2020 before returning to Australia before the 2020–21 W-League season (later known as A-League Women). She scored 5 goals in 24 matches with the club, which finished the season in third place.

=== Melbourne Victory, 2020–2023 ===
Melbourne Victory manager Jeff Hopkins had contacted Morrison while in Sweden to offer her a role with the team. Morön BK transferred Morrison to Melbourne Victory FC on November 4, 2020. She scored her first professional goal on February 20, 2021, in a 2–0 win against Newcastle Jets FC.

Morrison played every minute in the 2020–21 season at center-back, in which Victory recorded eight clean sheets on its way to winning the 2021 W-League grand final for the league championship. The team voted Morrison its Player's Player of the Year, and the club awarded her the Victory Medal as its Player of the Year. She re-signed with the team in August 2021.

Melbourne Victory appointed Morrison as its captain for the 2021–22 season. After scoring a goal in the season's first match she suffered an anterior cruciate ligament tear in her right knee at the 38th minute. She underwent surgery and missed the remainder of the campaign.

Morrison returned to Victory for the 2022–23 season and was again appointed captain. She scored four goals during the season, including a hat-trick against Newcastle Jets. Victory registered five clean sheets in the league to finish in fourth place.

=== Portland Thorns, 2023 ===
On June 29, 2023, NWSL club Portland Thorns signed Morrison to a short-term national team replacement player contract, with the team losing six players for the duration of the 2023 FIFA Women's World Cup. At the end of the tournament, Morrison was released.

=== Melbourne Victory, 2023– ===
Following her short stint at Portland Thorns, Morrison re-signed with Melbourne Victory in the A-League Women.

== Personal life ==
Morrison became an Australian citizen in November 2023.

== Honors ==
FC Bulleen Lions

- National Premier Leagues Women's Championship: 2018

Melbourne Victory

- A-League Women Championship: 2020–21, 2021–22

Individual

- Big 12 Conference Defender of the Year: 2017
