= Gaby Garton =

Argentine footballer (born 1990)

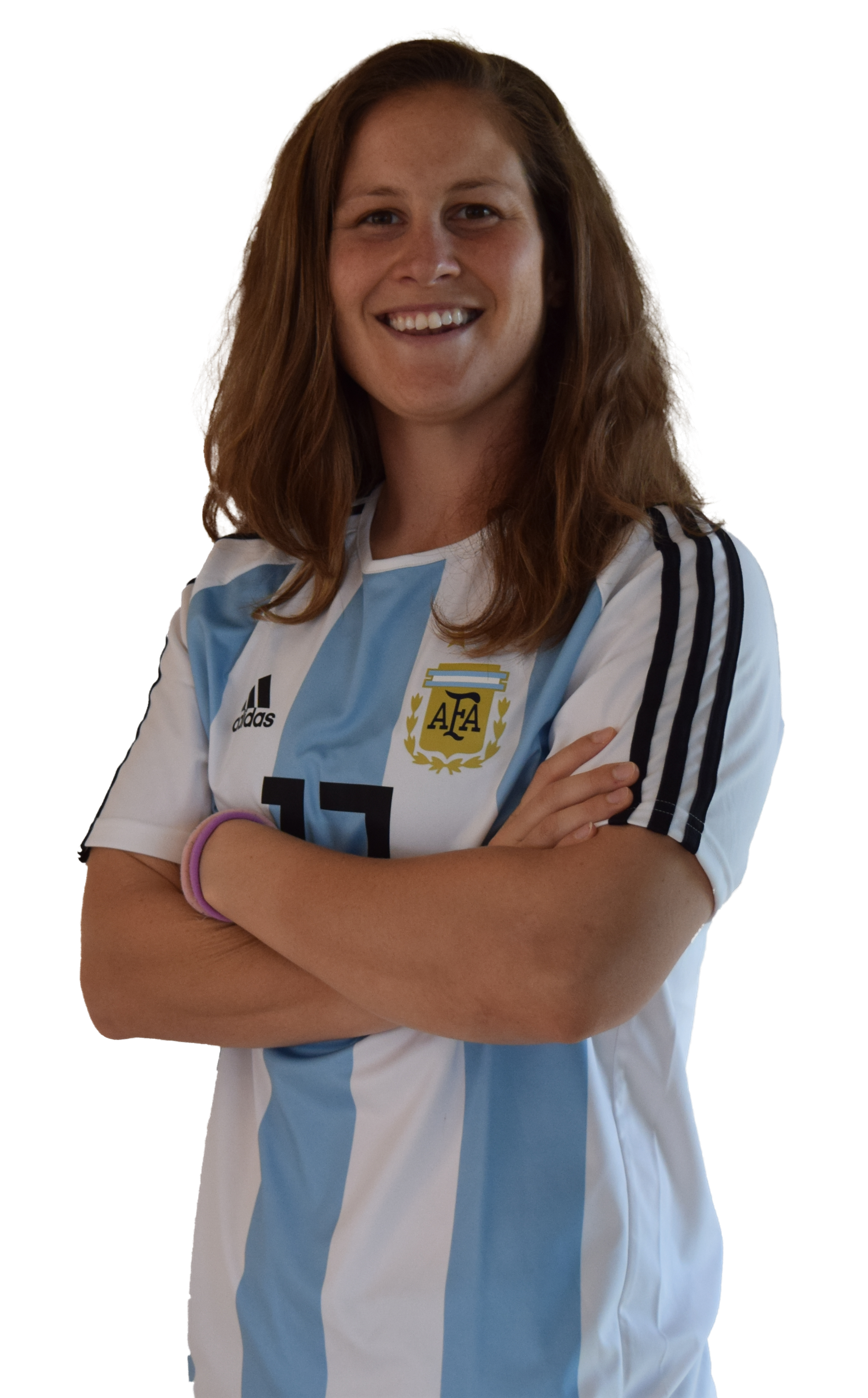

Personal information
- Full name: Gabriela Nicole Garton
- Date of birth: May 27, 1990 (age 36)
- Place of birth: Rochester, Minnesota, United States
- Height: 1.74 m (5 ft 9 in)
- Position: Goalkeeper

Team information
- Current team: Bulleen Lions

College career
Years	Team	Apps	(Gls)
2008–2009	South Florida Bulls	0	(0)
2010–2011	Rice Owls	1	(0)

Senior career*
Years	Team	Apps	(Gls)
2012–2015	River Plate		
2015–2018	UAI Urquiza		
2018–2019	Sol de Mayo (SL)		
2019–2020	Essendon Royals		
2020–2021	Melbourne Victory	14	(0)
2022	Bulleen Lions	5	(0)
2022-2023	Melbourne Victory	1	(0)
2023-	Bulleen Lions	7	(0)

International career
2018	Argentina	2	(0)
- * Club domestic league appearances and goals as of 4 March 2021

Gabriela Nicole Garton (born 27 May 1990), known as Gaby Garton, is a footballer who plays as a goalkeeper for Bulleen Lions. Born in the United States, she represented the Argentina national team.

== Early life and college ==
Garton's father is American and her mother is Argentine. She was raised in Sarasota, Florida. Growing up, Garton attended Sarasota Christian School and played football for their girls team, often taking additional training with the school's boys team as well as separate goalkeeper training. Garton attended the University of South Florida and Rice University.

== Club career ==
=== Essendon Royals ===
In November 2019, Garton joined Australian club Essendon Royals.

=== Melbourne Victory ===
In December 2020, Garton joined Australian W-League club Melbourne Victory. Following the season, Garton stepped away from the playing squad due to becoming pregnant, and was appointed as a development coach by the club.

== International career ==
Garton was selected by Argentina for the 2019 FIFA Women's World Cup. In 2019, Garton was one of eight players to be given a professional central contract by the Argentine Football Association (AFA) of $330 a month. After her retirement, Garton called out the abuse she had received while playing and the AFA's poor treatment of women's football. She cited that a coach she had reported to FIFA for sexual assault was still coaching and alleged that the coach had used threats of defamation lawsuits to silence any other players speaking out. She also stated that the AFA were not providing sufficient training equipment for women's football and stated that often the women's team were forced to leave pitches so that boy's academy players could train.
