= Kajsa Lind =

Swedish footballer (born 1996)

Personal information
- Full name: Kajsa Matilda Lind
- Date of birth: 13 September 1996 (age 30)
- Place of birth: Sweden
- Position: Defender

Team information
- Current team: Vittsjö
- Number: 23

Senior career*
Years	Team	Apps	(Gls)
2018–2022	Vittsjö	44	(0)
2022–2023	Brisbane Roar	15	(0)
2023–	Vittsjö	33	(2)
- * Club domestic league appearances and goals

Kajsa Lind (born 13 September 1996) is a Swedish footballer who plays as a midfielder for Vittsjö.

== Career ==
Lind started her career with Swedish side Vittsjö. She helped the club achieve third place in the 2019 Damallsvenskan.

== Style of play ==
Lind mainly operates as a defender. She has operated as a midfielder while playing for Swedish side Vittsjö.

== Personal life ==
Lind has been nicknamed "Ironwoman". She has worked as a nurse.
