= Gabriella Coleman (soccer) =

American soccer player (born 1998)

Personal information
- Full name: Gabriella Lindsay Coleman
- Date of birth: October 10, 1998 (age 28)
- Place of birth: Keller, Texas
- Height: 5 ft 8 in (1.73 m)
- Position: Forward

College career
Years	Team	Apps	(Gls)
2017–2018	Mississippi State Bulldogs	32	(3)
2019–2021	Oklahoma State Cowgirls	57	(22)

Senior career*
Years	Team	Apps	(Gls)
2022	HK		
2022–2023	Perth Glory FC	10	(3)
- * Club domestic league appearances and goals

Gabriella Lindsay Coleman (born October 10, 1998) is an American soccer player who last played as a striker for Perth Glory.

== Early life ==
Coleman started playing soccer at the age of four.

== Career ==
Coleman played for the Mississippi State Bulldogs, where she operated as an outside-back and striker.

== Style of play ==
Coleman mainly operates as a striker and has been described as "very strong in open space when she is running at defenders, she also offers the flexibility in her game to link play up and play with her back to goal".

== Personal life ==
Coleman is a native of Texas, United States.

Her father is Marcus Coleman.
