= Emily Garnier =

American soccer player (born 1996)

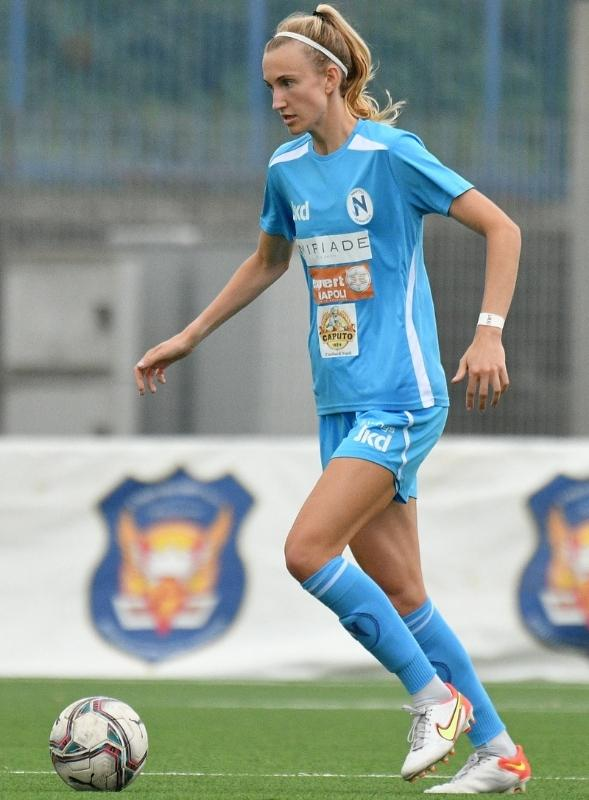

Personal information
- Full name: Emily Jayne Garnier
- Date of birth: July 25, 1996 (age 30)
- Place of birth: Littleton, Colorado, United States
- Height: 1.81 m (5 ft 11 in)
- Position: Defender

Team information
- Current team: Fortuna Hjørring

College career
Years	Team	Apps	(Gls)
2014–2017	Colorado Mines Orediggers	92	(12)

Emily Garnier (born July 25, 1996) is an American professional soccer player who plays as a forward for Danish Women's League club Fortuna Hjørring.
