= Vesna Milivojević =

Association football player (born 2001)

Personal information
- Date of birth: 27 December 2001 (age 24)
- Place of birth: Sydney, New South Wales, Australia
- Position: Midfielder

Team information
- Current team: Norrköping
- Number: 11

Senior career*
Years	Team	Apps	(Gls)
2017–2019	Bankstown City		
2019–2020	Western Sydney Wanderers	5	(0)
2020	Spartak Subotica		
2021	Borussia Bocholt	13	(1)
2021–2022	Spartak Subotica		
2022–2024	Canberra United	40	(18)
2024–2025	Norrköping	45	(7)
2025–	Malmö	0	(0)

International career^{‡}
2022–	Serbia	28	(2)
- * Club domestic league appearances and goals as of 17 November 2025 ‡ National team caps and goals as of 13 October 2026

Vesna Milivojević (Serbian Cyrillic: Весна Миливојевић; born 27 December 2001) is a footballer who plays as a midfielder for Damallsvenskan club Malmö FF. Born and raised in Australia to Serbian parents, she has represented the Serbia women's national team since 2022.

== Early life ==
Milivojević started playing football at a young age with her brothers, before playing futsal.

== Club career ==
Milivojević started her career with Australian second-tier side Bankstown City, where she was described as the "heart and soul of the Bankstown squad, scoring goals and also being a provider". After that, she signed Australian top flight side Western Sydney Wanderers, before playing for German side Borussia Bocholt and Serbian side Spartak Subotica, helping them win the league and playing in the UEFA Women's Champions League.

In 2022, she signed for Australian side Canberra United. During her first season with the club, she was described as a "silent assassin", showing consistent form and complimenting star attacker Michelle Heyman.

In April 2024, after making 40 appearances for the club in two seasons, Milivojević left Canberra United to join Swedish club Norrköping.

== International career ==
Milivojević has represented the Serbia women's national football team internationally, a decision that initially conflicted her. While she did want to represent Australia, her lack of selection led her to switch associations, being eligible under FIFA eligibility rules through her Serbian parents.

== Style of play ==
Milivojević mainly operates as a midfielder and is known for her passing ability and dribbling ability.

== Personal life ==
Milivojević was born in Sydney, Australia, to Serbian parents. She is not related to Luka Milivojević.

== Career statistics ==
No.	Date	Venue	Opponent	Score	Result	Competition
1.	30 November 2021	Stadion Lokomotiv, Plovdiv, Bulgaria	Bulgaria	2–0	4–1	2023 FIFA Women's World Cup qualification
2.	9 October 2026	Tammelan Stadion, Tampere, Finland	Finland	1–2	1–3	2027 FIFA Women's World Cup qualification play-offs
