= Vittsjö GIK =

- Full name: Vittsjö Gymnastik- och Idrottsklubb
- Founded: 1933
- Ground: Vittsjö IP, Vittsjö
- Capacity: 2,000
- Head coach: Mladen Blagojevic
- League: Damallsvenskan
- 2025: 7th
- Website: https://www.svenskalag.se/vittsjogik
Home colours

Vittsjö Gymnastik- och Idrottsklubb is a football club from Vittsjö, Sweden. They play in the highest level of women's football leagues in Sweden, the Damallsvenskan.

Vittsjö GIK play their home games at Vittsjö IP in Vittsjö, a 1,500 capacity stadium completed in April 2012.

== Current squad ==
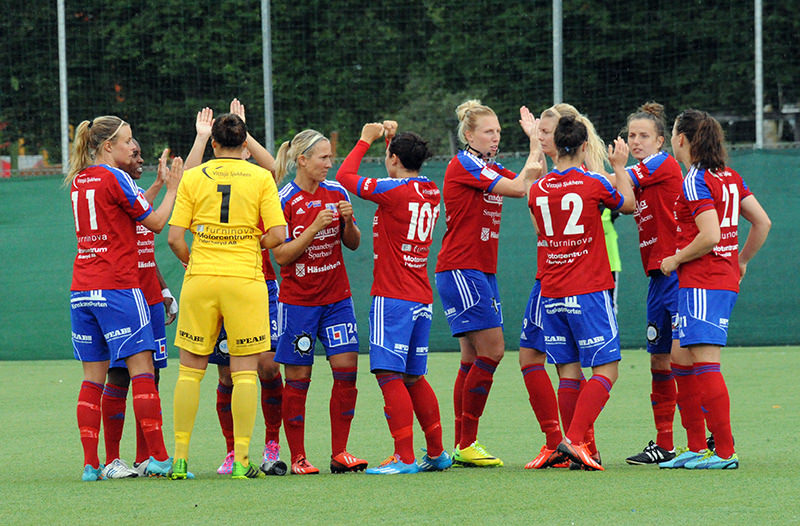
In August 2014

As of 31 December 2024.

Note: Flags indicate national team as defined under FIFA eligibility rules; some limited exceptions apply. Players may hold more than one non-FIFA nationality.

No.	Pos.	Nation	Player
1	GK	HUN	Lauren Brzykcy
2	DF	CAN	Shannon Woeller
3	MF	FIN	Julia Tunturi
4	MF	USA	Julia Leas
5	MF	SWE	Hannah Sjödahl
7	MF	SWE	Klara Nyberg
8	MF	USA	Jessica Ayers
9	DF	SWE	Lisa Klinga
11	MF	SWE	Cajsa Rubensson (on loan from Rosengård)
12	FW	CAN	Tanya Boychuk
13	GK	SWE	Elin Vaughan

No.	Pos.	Nation	Player
14	DF	NED	Sheila van den Bulk
15	MF	SWE	Nellie Persson
16	MF	SWE	Olivia Wänglund
18	FW	FIN	Linda Sällström
19	FW	FIN	Heidi Kollanen
20	FW	SWE	Hanna Ekengren
22	DF	SWE	Sandra Lynn (captain)
23	DF	SWE	Kajsa Lind
—	MF	FIN	Ilona Walta
—	DF	FIN	Sanni Ojanen

=== Former players ===
For details of former players, see Category:Vittsjö GIK players.
