= 2026 A-League Women grand final =

- Event: 2025–26 A-League Women
| Melbourne City | Wellington Phoenix |
| 3 | 1 |
- Date: 16 May 2026
- Venue: AAMI Park, Melbourne, Australia
- Player of the Match: Holly McNamara (Melbourne City)
- Referee: Isabella Mossin (Football NSW)
- Attendance: 7,174

The 2026 A-League Women grand final, known officially as the Ninja A-League Women grand final, was the soccer championship match between Melbourne City and Wellington Phoenix at AAMI Park in Melbourne on 16 May 2026. It was the 17th A-League Women grand final and the culmination of the 2025–26 season. Melbourne City were the premiership champions in the regular season and Wellington Phoenix placed second.

The match was broadcast live in Australia and New Zealand by Network 10 and Sky Sport respectively.

City's Holly McNamara scored twice in two minutes late into the first half, leading City 2–0 into halftime. Shortly after the beginning of the second half, Leticia McKenna scored a third goal for the hosts in the 49th minute. Makala Woods clawed one goal back for the Wellington Phoenix, but the visitors were unable to capitalise further, with the result ending 3–1. This match was the first A-League Grand Final appearance for the club for either the Men or Women's team.

== Teams ==
| Team | Previous grand final appearances (bold indicates winners) |
|---|---|
| Melbourne City | 5 (**2016**, **2017**, **2018**, **2020**, 2024) |
| Wellington Phoenix | 0 |

== Route to the final ==
=== Melbourne City ===
| Round | Melbourne City | |
|---|---|---|
| Regular season | **Premiers**: Pos / Team / Pld / Pts; **1** / Melbourne City (C) / **20** / **40**; 2 / Wellington Phoenix / 20 / **34**; 3 / Canberra United / 20 / **31**; 4 / Brisbane Roar / 20 / **31**; 5 / Adelaide United / 20 / **30**; Source: A-Leagues (C) Champions | |
| Semi-finals | Opponent | Score |
| Semi-finals | Melbourne Victory | 2–0 (agg.) |

=== Wellington Phoenix ===
| Round | Wellington Phoenix | |
|---|---|---|
| Regular season | **Runners-up**: Pos / Team / Pld / Pts; 1 / Melbourne City (C) / 20 / **40**; **2** / Wellington Phoenix / **20** / **34**; 3 / Canberra United / 20 / **31**; 4 / Brisbane Roar / 20 / **31**; 5 / Adelaide United / 20 / **30**; Source: A-Leagues (C) Champions | |
| Round | Opponent | Score |
| Semi-finals | Brisbane Roar | 3–2 (a.e.t.) (agg.) |

=== Bracket ===
Elimination-finals
3 | Canberra United | 1
6 | **Melbourne Victory** | **3**
4 | **Brisbane Roar** | **3**
5 | Adelaide United | 0

Semi-finals
1 | **Melbourne City** | 1 | 1 | **2**
6 | Melbourne Victory | 0 | 0 | 0
2 | **Wellington Phoenix** | 1 | 2 | **3**
4 | Brisbane Roar | 2 | 0 | 2

Grand Final
1 | **Melbourne City** | 3
2 | Wellington Phoenix | 1

== Match ==
=== Details ===
16 May 2026
16:15 AEST (UTC+10:00)

| Melbourne City | 3–1 | Wellington Phoenix |
|---|---|---|
| McNamara 41', 43'; McKenna 49' | Report | Woods 52' |

AAMI Park, Melbourne
Attendance: 7,174
Referee: Isabella Mossin (Football NSW)

| **Melbourne City** | **Wellington Phoenix** |

| GK | 24 | (Spain) Malena Mieres |
| RCB | 5 | (United States) Taylor Otto |
| CB | 13 | (New Zealand) Rebekah Stott (c) |
| LCB | 3 | (England) Danielle Turner |
| RWB | 16 | (Australia) Karly Roestbakken | (substituted off) 87' |
| CM | 18 | (Australia) Leah Davidson |
| CM | 12 | (Australia) Shelby McMahon |
| CM | 6 | (Australia) Leticia McKenna | (substituted off) 78' |
| LWB | 22 | (Australia) Bryleeh Henry |
| ST | 23 | (Australia) Aideen Keane |
| ST | 9 | (Australia) Holly McNamara | (substituted off) 90+1' |
Substitutes:
| GK | 23 | (Australia) Melissa Barbieri |
| DF | 2 | (England) Ellie Wilson |
| MF | 7 | (Australia) Danella Butrus |
| MF | 8 | (Australia) Alexia Apostolakis | (substituted on) 87' |
| FW | 11 | (New Zealand) Deven Jackson | (substituted on) 90+1' |
| MF | 14 | (Wales) Laura Hughes | (substituted on) 78' |
| FW | 20 | (Australia) Caitlin Karić |
Manager:
(Australia) Michael Matricciani

| GK | 1 | (New Zealand) Victoria Esson |
| RB | 5 | (United States) Ellie Walker | (yellow card) 72' |
| CB | 4 | (New Zealand) Mackenzie Barry (c) |
| CB | 16 | (New Zealand) Marisa van der Meer |
| LB | 11 | (New Zealand) Manaia Elliott | | (substituted off) 65' |
| RM | 23 | (England) Brooke Nunn |
| CM | 32 | (New Zealand) Emma Pijnenburg |
| CM | 7 | (New Zealand) Grace Jale |
| LM | 24 | (New Zealand) Pia Vlok | | (substituted off) 53' |
| ST | 14 | (Dominican Republic) Lucía León | | (substituted off) 46' |
| ST | 31 | (United States) Makala Woods |
Substitutes:
| GK | 22 | (New Zealand) Aimee Danieli |
| DF | 3 | (Lebanon) Tiana Jaber |
| MF | 8 | (New Zealand) Macey Fraser | | (substituted on) 53' |
| MF | 15 | (New Zealand) Daisy Brazendale |
| DF | 21 | (New Zealand) Lara Wall | | (substituted on) 65' |
| FW | 27 | (New Zealand) Zoe Benson |
| FW | 30 | (United States) Mackenzie Anthony | | (substituted on) 46' |
Manager:
(England) Bev Priestman

Player of the Match:
Holly McNamara (Melbourne City)

Assistant referees:
Lucy Hungerford
Claire Green
Fourth official:
Caitlin Williams
Fifth official:
Paula Orlandi

**Match rules**

- 90 minutes
- 30 minutes of extra time if necessary.
- Penalty shoot-out if scores still level
- Six named substitutes.
- Maximum of four substitutions, with a fifth allowed in extra time.

== See also ==
- 2025–26 A-League Women
- 2025–26 Melbourne City FC (women) season
- 2025–26 Wellington Phoenix FC (women) season
