= 2025–26 Wellington Phoenix FC (women) season =

5th season in existence of Wellington Phoenix (women)

Wellington Phoenix
2025–26 season
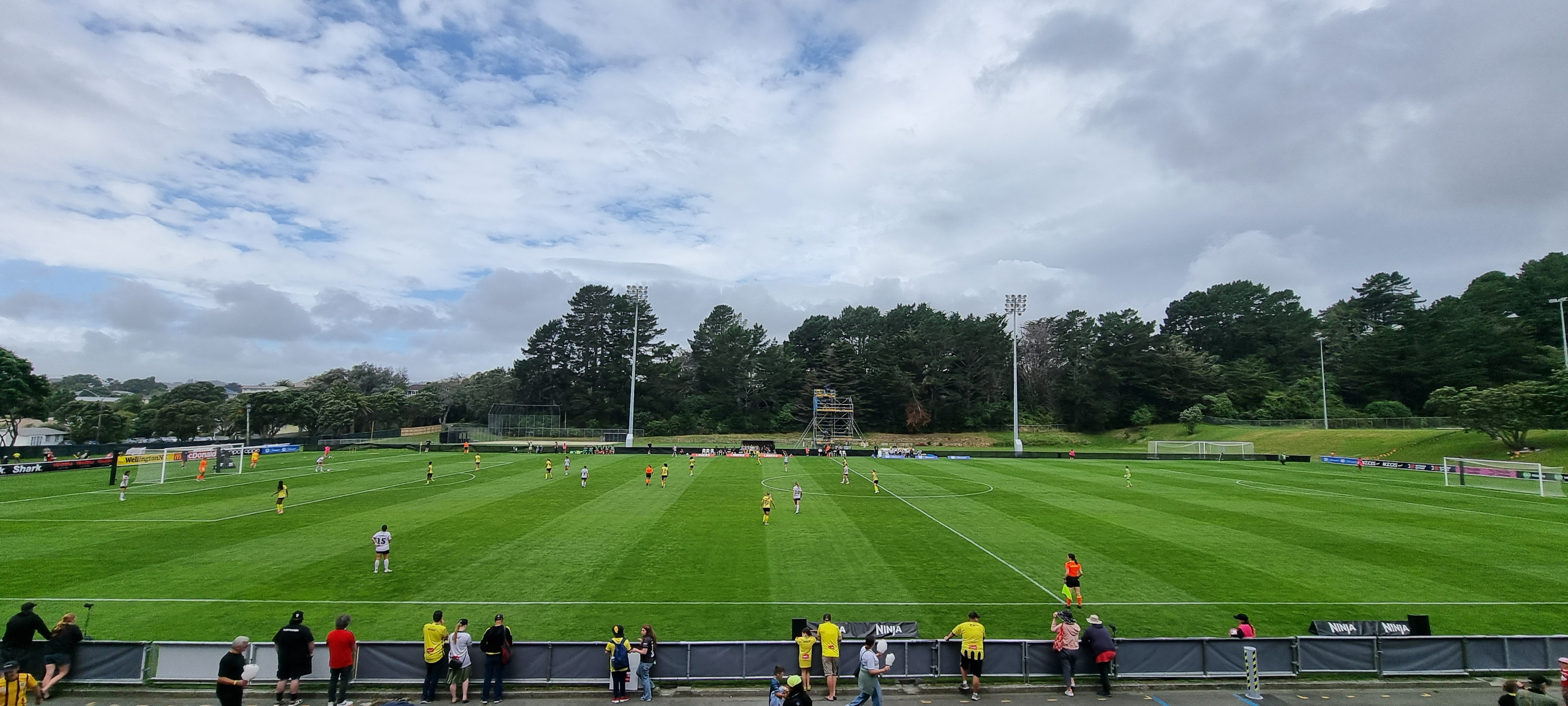
- Match between the Phoenix and Adelaide United at Porirua Park (Jerry Collins Stadium) on 25 January 2026.
- Chairman: Robert Morrison
- Manager: Bev Priestman
- Stadium: Jerry Collins Stadium, Porirua; Wellington Regional Stadium, Wellington (three matches) (Note: Known as Sky Stadium from 2020 until 28 February 2026 and as Hnry Stadium from 1 March 2026 onwards.)
- A-League Women: 2nd
- A-League Women Finals: Runners-up
- Top goalscorer: League: Pia Vlok and Brooke Nunn (6 goals each); All: Makala Woods (8 goals)
- Highest home attendance: 4,655 vs. Canberra United (8 November 2025)
- Lowest home attendance: 772 vs. Melbourne Victory (23 November 2025)
- Average home league attendance: 2,103
- Biggest win: 7–0 vs. Sydney (H) (20 December 2025)
- Biggest defeat: 0–1 vs. Melbourne City (A) (7 December 2025); 0–1 vs. Perth Glory (A) (12 December 2025); 1–2 vs. Melbourne City (H) (10 January 2026); 1–2 vs. Central Coast Mariners (H) (15 February 2026); 1–2 vs. Central Coast Mariners (A) (25 March 2026); 0–1 vs. Western Sydney Wanderers (H) (29 March 2026); 1–2 vs. Brisbane Roar (A) (3 May 2026)
Home colours	Away colours	Third colours
- All statistics correct as of end of season.

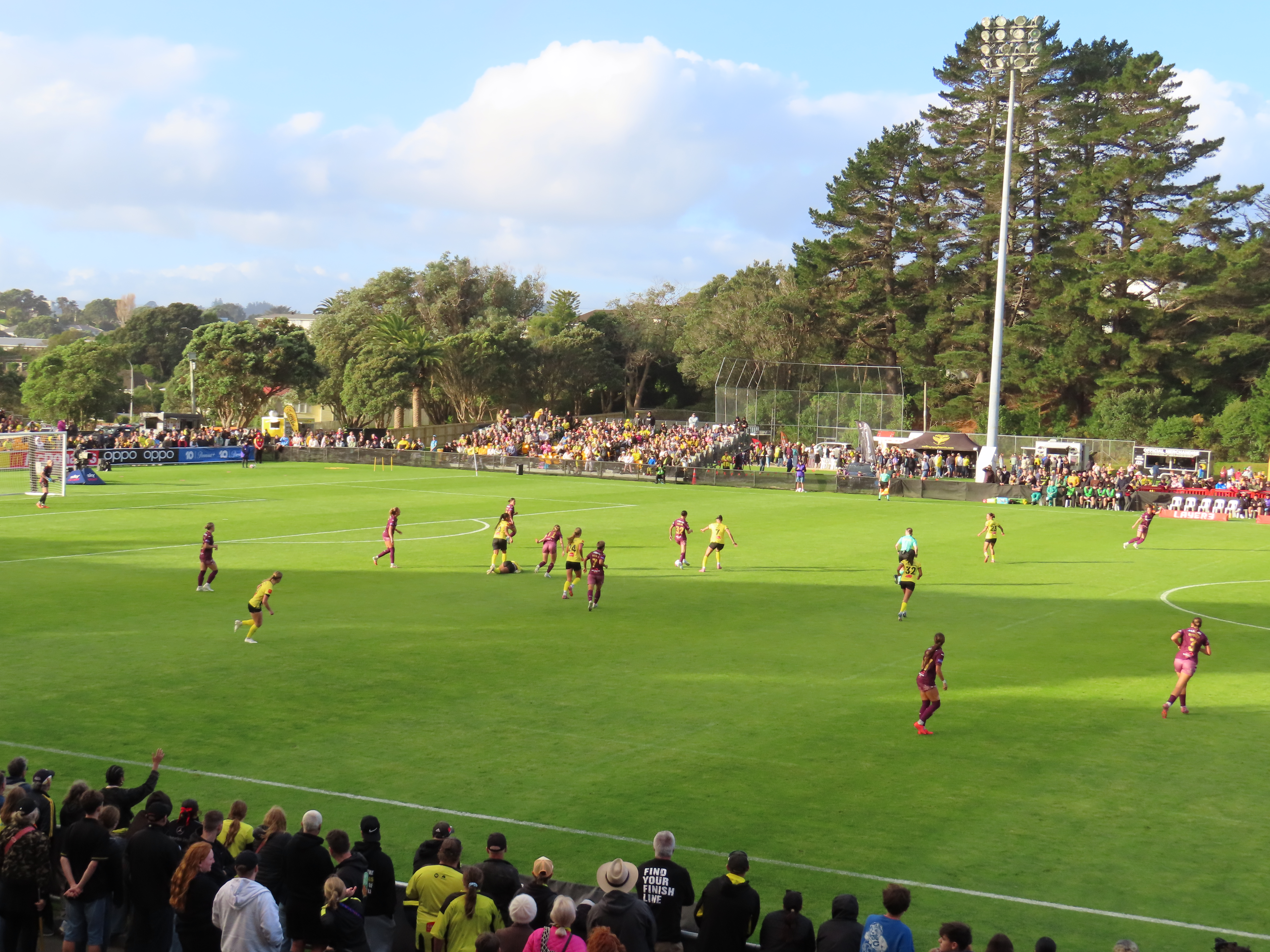
Semifinal match between the Phoenix and Brisbane Roar FC on 10 May 2026.

The 2025–26 season was the fifth in the history of Wellington Phoenix. They competed in the A-League Women for the fifth time.

On 30 July 2025, the Phoenix signed Bev Priestman as head coach on a 2-year contract.

For the first time in their history, the Wellington Phoenix qualified for the A-League Women Finals, finishing in second position. They became the first New Zealand side to compete in a Grand Final in the A-Leagues, but lost the final 3–1 to Melbourne City.

== Players ==
=== First-team squad ===
Note: Flags indicate national team as defined under FIFA eligibility rules; some limited exceptions apply. Players may hold more than one non-FIFA nationality.

No.	Pos.	Nation	Player
1	GK	NZL	Victoria Esson
2	DF	NZL	CJ Bott (captain)
3	DF	LBN	Tiana Jaber
4	DF	NZL	Mackenzie Barry
5	DF	USA	Ellie Walker
6	MF	NED	Tessel Middag
7	FW	NZL	Grace Jale
8	MF	NZL	Macey Fraser
9	FW	NEP	Sabitra Bhandari
10	MF	NZL	Alyssa Whinham
11	MF	NZL	Manaia Elliott
12	DF	NZL	Ella McMillan (scholarship)
13	GK	NZL	Brooke Neary (youth)
14	DF	DOM	Lucía León
15	MF	NZL	Daisy Brazendale
16	DF	NZL	Marisa van der Meer

No.	Pos.	Nation	Player
17	MF	NZL	Ela Jerez (scholarship)
18	FW	NZL	Ella McCann (scholarship)
20	FW	NZL	Emma Main
21	DF	NZL	Lara Wall (scholarship)
22	GK	NZL	Aimee Danieli
23	FW	ENG	Brooke Nunn
24	FW	NZL	Pia Vlok (scholarship)
25	GK	NZL	Harriet Muller (youth)
26	FW	NZL	Lily Brazendale (youth)
27	FW	NZL	Zoe Benson (youth)
28	FW	NZL	Grace Bartlett (youth)
29	MF	NZL	Mikaela Bangalan (youth)
30	FW	USA	Mackenzie Anthony (injury replacement)
31	FW	USA	Makala Woods (injury replacement)
32	MF	NZL	Emma Pijnenburg

== Transfers ==
=== Transfers in ===
No.	Pos.	Player	From	Type/fee	Contract length	Date	Ref.
14	DF	(Dominican Republic) Lucía León	Adelaide United	Free transfer	1 year	10 June 2025	
5	DF	(United States) Ellie Walker	(Portugal) Braga	Free transfer	1 year	12 June 2025	
6	MF	(Netherlands) Tessel Middag	(Scotland) Rangers	Free transfer	1 year	19 June 2025	
1	GK	Victoria Esson	(Scotland) Rangers	Free transfer	1 year	24 June 2025	
9	FW	(Nepal) Sabitra Bhandari	(France) Guingamp	Free transfer	2 years	17 July 2025	
2	DF	CJ Bott	(England) Leicester City	Free transfer	2 years	1 August 2025	
24	FW	Pia Vlok	(New Zealand) Auckland United	Free transfer	3 years (Note: The first two years of the contract are on scholarship terms.)	5 August 2025	
16	DF	Marisa van der Meer	(New Zealand) Western Springs	Free transfer	2 years	4 September 2025	
8	MF	Macey Fraser	(United States) Utah Royals	Free transfer	3 years	12 September 2025	
23	FW	(England) Brooke Nunn	Central Coast Mariners	Free transfer	1 year	24 October 2025	
27	FW	Zoe Benson	(New Zealand) Auckland United	Youth development agreement		4 December 2025	
32	MF	Emma Pijnenburg	(Netherlands) Feyenoord	Free transfer	6 months	29 December 2025	
31	FW	(United States) Makala Woods	Unattached	Injury replacement	6 months	7 January 2026	
30	FW	(United States) Mackenzie Anthony	(Republic of Ireland) Shelbourne	Injury replacement	6 months	22 January 2026	

==== From academy squad ====
N	Pos.	Nat.	Name	Age	Notes
28	FW	(New Zealand)	Grace Bartlett	18	youth development agreement
26	FW	(New Zealand)	Lily Brazendale	19	youth development agreement
25	GK	(New Zealand)	Harriet Muller	17	youth development agreement
29	MF	(New Zealand)	Mikaela Bangalan	18	youth development agreement

=== Transfers out ===
No.	Pos.	Player	Transferred to	Type/fee	Date	Ref.
16	MF	Annalie Longo	Retired		20 April 2025	
39	GK	(Portugal) Carolina Vilão	Unattached	End of contract	23 June 2025	
5	DF	(United States) Alivia Kelly	Unattached	End of contract	9 July 2025	
6	MF	(United States) Maya McCutcheon	Unattached	End of contract	9 July 2025	
9	FW	(England) Olivia Fergusson	Unattached	End of contract	9 July 2025	
14	MF	(Japan) Mebae Tanaka	Unattached	End of contract	9 July 2025	
2	DF	Zoe McMeeken	Unattached	End of contract	11 July 2025	
8	MF	Amelia Abbott	Unattached	End of contract	11 July 2025	
23	DF	Rebecca Lake	Unattached	End of contract	5 September 2025	
19	MF	Olivia Ingham	(New Zealand) Auckland United	Mutual contract termination	18 March 2026	

=== Contract extensions ===
No.	Player	Position	Duration	Date	Ref.
20	Emma Main	Forward	2 years	4 July 2025	
4	Mackenzie Barry	Defender	1 year	9 July 2025	
7	Grace Jale	Forward	1 year	16 July 2025	
3	(Lebanon) Tiana Jaber	Defender	2 years	23 July 2025	
13	Brooke Neary	Goalkeeper	1 year (Note: Signed on a youth development agreement.)	18 September 2025	
23	(England) Brooke Nunn	Forward	1 year (Note: Contract extended from end of 2025–26 to end of 2026–27.)	12 March 2026	
31	(United States) Makala Woods	Forward	1 year	12 March 2026	
5	(United States) Ellie Walker	Defender	1 year	27 March 2026	
4	Mackenzie Barry	Defender	1 year	15 April 2026	
7	Grace Jale	Forward	1 year	29 April 2026	

== Pre-season and friendlies ==
The Phoenix's preseason fixtures were confirmed by the club on 24 September 2025.

12 October 2025	Central Coast Mariners	2–1	Wellington Phoenix	Gosford
	Gomez 25'	Report	Bhandari	Stadium: polytec Stadium

17 October 2025	Western Sydney Wanderers	0–0	Wellington Phoenix	Sydney
		Report		Stadium: TBC

24 April 2026	Wellington Phoenix	2–2 (5–3 p)	Auckland United	Upper Hutt
	Woods 23', 29'	Report	Jenkins 18'; Green 28'	Stadium: NZCIS
	Penalties
	Penalty scored		(penalty missed) Green

== Competitions ==
=== Overall record ===
Competition	First match	Last match	Starting round	Final position	Record							
Competition	First match	Last match	Starting round	Final position	Pld	W	D	L	GF	GA	GD	Win %
A-League Women	8 November 2025	3 April 2026	Matchday 1	2nd	20	10	4	6	38	17	+21	50.00
A-League Women Finals	3 May 2026	16 May 2026	Semi-finals	Runners-up	3	1	0	2	4	5	−1	33.33
Total					23	11	4	8	42	22	+20	47.83

Last updated: End of season.
Source: Competitions

=== A-League Women ===
==== League table ====
Pos	Team	Pld	W	D	L	GF	GA	GD	Pts	Qualification
1	Melbourne City (C)	20	12	4	4	36	20	+16	40	Qualification for AFC Women's Champions League and Finals series
2	Wellington Phoenix (Note: Wellington Phoenix cannot qualify for the AFC Women's Champions League as they are based in New Zealand, which is part of the Oceania Football Confederation.)	20	10	4	6	38	17	+21	34	Qualification for Finals series
3	Canberra United	20	9	4	7	30	24	+6	31	Qualification for Finals series
4	Brisbane Roar	20	9	4	7	37	39	−2	31	Qualification for Finals series
5	Adelaide United	20	9	3	8	24	26	−2	30	Qualification for Finals series

Source: A-Leagues
Rules for classification: 1) points; 2) goal difference; 3) goals scored; 4) wins; 5) head-to-head results; 5a) head-to-head points; 5b) head-to-head goal difference; 6) Fair Play points; 7) away goal difference; 8) away goals per match; 9) home goal difference; 10) home goals per match; 11) toss of a coin in an event of a tie of two clubs.
(C) Champions

==== Results summary ====
As of end of regular season.

Overall								Home						Away					
Pld	W	D	L	GF	GA	GD	Pts	W	D	L	GF	GA	GD	W	D	L	GF	GA	GD
20	10	4	6	38	17	+21	34	5	2	3	19	8	+11	5	2	3	19	9	+10

==== Matches ====
Win Draw Loss

8 November 2025 2	Wellington Phoenix	1–1	Canberra United	Wellington
16:00 NZDT	Van der Meer 39'	Report	Aulicino 18'	Stadium: Sky Stadium; Attendance: 4,655; Referee: Sarah Jones

16 November 2025 3	Wellington Phoenix	1–1	Newcastle Jets	Porirua
16:00 NZDT	Nunn 4'	Report	Ayres 23' (pen.)	Stadium: Porirua Park; Attendance: 1,292; Referee: Anna-Marie Keighley

23 November 2025 4	Wellington Phoenix	1–0	Melbourne Victory	Porirua
16:00 NZDT	Vlok 38'	Report		Stadium: Porirua Park; Attendance: 772; Referee: Anna-Marie Keighley

7 December 2025 6	Melbourne City	1–0	Wellington Phoenix	Melbourne
15:00 AEDT	Stott 86'	Report		Stadium: ctrl:cyber Pitch; Attendance: 619; Referee: Shab Roshan

12 December 2025 7	Perth Glory	1–0	Wellington Phoenix	Perth
20:00 AWST	Phonsongkham 75'	Report		Stadium: Sam Kerr Football Centre; Attendance: 1,069; Referee: Mikayla Ryan

20 December 2025 8	Wellington Phoenix	7–0	Sydney FC	Porirua
16:00 NZDT	Elliott 3'; Bhandari 13', 69'; Jale 36', 54'; Tumeth 80' (o.g.); Hunter 90' (o.g.)	Report		Stadium: Porirua Park; Attendance: 1,009; Referee: Sarah Jones

30 December 2025 10	Western Sydney Wanderers	0–3	Wellington Phoenix	Sydney
19:00 AEDT		Report	Main 7', 52'; Bhandari 48'	Stadium: Wanderers Football Park; Attendance: 1,622; Referee: Georgia Ghirardello

3 January 2026 11	Brisbane Roar	2–2	Wellington Phoenix	Brisbane
15:00 AEST	Miller 18'; Piazza 34'	Report	Elliott 15'; Nunn 90+8'	Stadium: Kayo Stadium; Attendance: 4,494; Referee: Lara Lee

10 January 2026 12	Wellington Phoenix	1–2	Melbourne City	Porirua
16:00 NZDT	Woods 90'	Report	McKenna 16'; Keane 21'	Stadium: Porirua Park; Attendance: 1,301; Referee: Anna-Marie Keighley

17 January 2026 13	Canberra United	0–2	Wellington Phoenix	Canberra
17:30 AEDT		Report	Benson 86'; Vlok 90+6'	Stadium: McKellar Park; Attendance: 1,415; Referee: Georgia Ghirardello

25 January 2026 14	Wellington Phoenix	3–1	Adelaide United	Porirua
16:00 NZDT	Woods 15'; Nunn 18', 86'	Report	I. Hodgson 87'	Stadium: Porirua Park; Attendance: 1,070; Referee: Sarah Jones

1 February 2026 15	Newcastle Jets	1–5	Wellington Phoenix	Newcastle
17:00 AEDT	Ayres 73'	Report	Vlok 10', 15', 64'; Pijnenburg 20'; Walker 24'	Stadium: No. 2 Sportsground; Attendance: 1,102; Referee: Mikayla Ryan

6 February 2026 16	Wellington Phoenix	1–0	Perth Glory	Wellington
16:00 NZDT	Woods 45+4'	Report		Stadium: Sky Stadium; Attendance: 3,800; Referee: Anna-Marie Keighley

15 February 2026 17	Wellington Phoenix	1–2	Central Coast Mariners	Porirua
16:00 NZDT	Anthony 28'	Report	Trimis 16'; Levin 45+2'	Stadium: Porirua Park; Attendance: 1,203; Referee: Anna-Marie Keighley

20 February 2026 18	Melbourne Victory	1–1	Wellington Phoenix	Melbourne
19:00 AEDT	Pollicina 52' (pen.)	Report	Woods 87'	Stadium: Home of the Matildas; Attendance: 512; Referee: Mikayla Ryan

14 March 2026 19	Wellington Phoenix	3–0	Brisbane Roar	Wellington
18:00 NZDT	Elliott 10'; Pijnenburg 16'; Woods 72'	Report		Stadium: Hnry Stadium; Attendance: 4,169; Referee: Sarah Jones

20 March 2026 20	Sydney FC	1–3	Wellington Phoenix	Sydney
19:00 AEDT	Tallon-Henniker 3'	Report	Vlok 12'; Van der Meer 64'; Nunn 75'	Stadium: Leichhardt Oval; Attendance: 939; Referee: Sophie Allum

25 March 2026 (Note: Initially scheduled for 29 November 2025, the match was rescheduled to 25 March 2026 as a result of a match between Australia and New Zealand scheduled for 28 November 2025.) 5	Central Coast Mariners	2–1	Wellington Phoenix	Gosford
19:00 AEDT	Familton 58'; Gomez 83'	Report	Fraser 90+3'	Stadium: Polytec Stadium; Attendance: 534; Referee: Sophie Allum

29 March 2026 21	Wellington Phoenix	0–1	Western Sydney Wanderers	Porirua
16:00 NZDT		Report	Yuan 78'	Stadium: Porirua Park; Attendance: 1,756; Referee: Mikayla Ryan

3 April 2026 22	Adelaide United	0–2	Wellington Phoenix	Adelaide
16:20 ACDT		Report	Van der Meer 30'; Nunn 34'	Stadium: Coopers Stadium; Attendance: 5,124; Referee: Georgia Ghirardello

==== Finals series ====
The Phoenix qualified for the A-League Women Finals for the first time in the club's history, finishing the regular season in second position. They received a bye into the semifinals.

3 May 2026 Semifinals – First leg	Brisbane Roar	2–1	Wellington Phoenix	Brisbane
17:00 AEST	Hayashi 14'; Brown 72'	Report	Jale 2'	Stadium: Spencer Park; Attendance: 3,849; Referee: Isabella Mossin

10 May 2026 Semifinals – Second leg	Wellington Phoenix	2–0 (a.e.t.) (3–2 agg.)	Brisbane Roar	Porirua
14:30 NZST	Woods 42', 102'	Report		Stadium: Porirua Park; Attendance: 5,923; Referee: Caitlin Williams

16 May 2026 Grand final	Melbourne City	3–1	Wellington Phoenix	Melbourne
16:15 AEST	McNamara 41', 43'; McKenna 49'	Report	Woods 52'	Stadium: AAMI Park; Attendance: 7,174; Referee: Isabella Mossin

== Statistics ==
=== Appearances and goals ===
Includes all competitions. Players with no appearances not included in the list.

As of end of season.

No.	Pos	Nat	Player	Total		A-League Women		A-League Women Finals	
No.	Pos	Nat	Player	Apps	Goals	Apps	Goals	Apps	Goals
Goalkeepers:
1	GK	(New Zealand) NZL	Victoria Esson	22	0	19	0	3	0
22	GK	(New Zealand) NZL	Aimee Danieli	1	0	1	0	0	0
Defenders:
2	DF	(New Zealand) NZL	CJ Bott	7	0	7	0	0	0
3	DF	(Lebanon) LBN	Tiana Jaber	6	0	0+6	0	0	0
4	DF	(New Zealand) NZL	Mackenzie Barry	23	0	20	0	3	0
5	DF	(United States) USA	Ellie Walker	23	1	20	1	3	0
14	DF	(Dominican Republic) DOM	Lucía León	20	0	12+5	0	3	0
16	DF	(New Zealand) NZL	Marisa van der Meer	22	3	19	3	3	0
21	DF	(New Zealand) NZL	Lara Wall	16	0	10+4	0	0+2	0
Midfielders:
6	MF	(Netherlands) NED	Tessel Middag	1	0	1	0	0	0
8	MF	(New Zealand) NZL	Macey Fraser	7	1	0+4	1	0+3	0
10	MF	(New Zealand) NZL	Alyssa Whinham	2	0	2	0	0	0
11	MF	(New Zealand) NZL	Manaia Elliott	23	3	13+7	3	3	0
15	MF	(New Zealand) NZL	Daisy Brazendale	20	0	2+17	0	0+1	0
29	MF	(New Zealand) NZL	Mikaela Bangalan	1	0	0	0	0+1	0
32	MF	(New Zealand) NZL	Emma Pijnenburg	17	2	11+3	2	3	0
Forwards:
7	FW	(New Zealand) NZL	Grace Jale	21	3	18	2	3	1
9	FW	(Nepal) NEP	Sabitra Bhandari	6	3	6	3	0	0
20	FW	(New Zealand) NZL	Emma Main	12	2	7+5	2	0	0
23	FW	(England) ENG	Brooke Nunn	23	6	20	6	3	0
24	FW	(New Zealand) NZL	Pia Vlok	22	6	16+3	6	2+1	0
27	FW	(New Zealand) NZL	Zoe Benson	15	1	0+14	1	0+1	0
28	FW	(New Zealand) NZL	Grace Barlett	1	0	0+1	0	0	0
30	FW	(United States) USA	Mackenzie Anthony	13	1	4+6	1	1+2	0
31	FW	(United States) USA	Makala Woods	15	8	10+2	5	3	3
Player(s) transferred out but featured this season:
19	MF	(New Zealand) NZL	Olivia Ingham	1	0	0+1	0	0	0

- Source: Wellington Phoenix

=== Disciplinary record ===
Includes all competitions. The list is sorted by squad number when total cards are equal. Players with no cards not included in the list.

As of end of season.

No.	Pos.	Nat.	Name	A-League Women			A-League Women Finals			Total		
No.	Pos.	Nat.	Name	Yellow card	(yellow card) (yellow-red card)	Red card	Yellow card	(yellow card) (yellow-red card)	Red card	Yellow card	(yellow card) (yellow-red card)	Red card
5	DF	(United States)	Ellie Walker	2	0	0	1	0	0	3	0	0
11	MF	(New Zealand)	Manaia Elliott	3	0	0	0	0	0	3	0	0
14	DF	(Dominican Republic)	Lucía León	3	0	0	0	0	0	3	0	0
31	FW	(United States)	Makala Woods	3	0	0	0	0	0	3	0	0
4	DF	(New Zealand)	Mackenzie Barry	2	0	0	0	0	0	2	0	0
16	DF	(New Zealand)	Marisa van der Meer	2	0	0	0	0	0	2	0	0
23	FW	(England)	Brooke Nunn	2	0	0	0	0	0	2	0	0
1	GK	(New Zealand)	Victoria Esson	0	0	0	1	0	0	1	0	0
2	DF	(New Zealand)	CJ Bott	1	0	0	0	0	0	1	0	0
7	FW	(New Zealand)	Grace Jale	1	0	0	0	0	0	1	0	0
Total				19	0	0	2	0	0	21	0	0

=== Clean sheets ===
Includes all competitions. The list is sorted by squad number when total clean sheets are equal. Goalkeepers with no clean sheets not included in the list.

As of end of season.

Rank	No.	Nat.	Goalkeeper	A-League Women	A-League Women Finals	Total
1	1	(New Zealand)	Victoria Esson	7	1	8
Total				7	1	8

=== Hat-tricks ===
Includes all competitions. As of end of season.

Player	Against	Result	Date	Ref.
(New Zealand) Pia Vlok	Newcastle Jets	5–1 (A)	1 February 2026	

== End of season awards ==
Wellington Phoenix season awards
Award	Winner
Members' under-23 player of the year	Pia Vlok
Members' player of the year	Brooke Nunn
Women's goal of the year	Macey Fraser (Rd 5 vs Central Coast Mariners)
Golden boot	Brooke Nunn and Pia Vlok (6)
Media player of the year	Brooke Nunn
Players' player of the year	Grace Jale
Entelar & OPPO women’s player of the year	Grace Jale
Lloyd Morrison Spirit of the Phoenix award	Mackenzie Barry

== See also ==
- 2025–26 Wellington Phoenix FC season
