= 2026–27 Wellington Phoenix FC (women) season =

6th season in existence of Wellington Phoenix (women)

Wellington Phoenix
2026–27 season
- Match between the Phoenix and Melbourne City on 18 October 2026.
- Chairman: Robert Morrison
- Manager: Bev Priestman
- Stadium: Jerry Collins Stadium, Porirua; Wellington Regional Stadium, Wellington (some matches)
- A-League Women: 2nd
- Top goalscorer: League: Makala Woods (3 goals); All: Makala Woods (3)
- Highest home attendance: 3,695 vs. Melbourne City (18 October 2026); A-League Women
- Lowest home attendance: 1,002 vs. Sydney (15 November 2026); A-League Women
- Average home league attendance: 2,198
- Biggest win: 2–0 vs. Adelaide United (A) (6 November 2026); A-League Women; 3–1 vs. Sydney FC (H) (15 November 2026); A-League Women; 2–0 vs. Western Sydney Wanderers (20 November 2026); A-League Women
- Biggest defeat: 0–2 vs. Perth Glory (A) (1 November 2026); A-League Women
Home colours	Away colours	Third colours
- All statistics correct as of 21 November 2026.

The 2026–27 season is the Wellington Phoenix's sixth season in the A-League Women.

Bev Priestman is the team's head coach for a second season.

== Players ==
=== First-team squad ===
Note: Flags indicate national team as defined under FIFA eligibility rules; some limited exceptions apply. Players may hold more than one non-FIFA nationality.

No.	Pos.	Nation	Player
1	GK	NZL	Victoria Esson
2	DF	NZL	CJ Bott (captain)
3	DF	NZL	Lara Wall
4	DF	NZL	Mackenzie Barry
5	DF	USA	Ellie Walker
6	DF	NZL	Abby Erceg
7	MF	NZL	Grace Jale
8	FW	NZL	Milly Clegg
9	FW	NEP	Sabitra Bhandari
10	MF	NZL	Alyssa Whinham
11	MF	NZL	Manaia Elliott
13	MF	AUS	Tameka Yallop
16	DF	NZL	Marisa van der Meer
17	FW	NZL	Indiah-Paige Riley

No.	Pos.	Nation	Player
19	MF	NZL	Mikaela Bangalan (scholarship)
20	FW	NZL	Emma Taylor-Main
21	MF	NZL	Sienna Candy (youth)
22	GK	NZL	Aimee Danieli
23	FW	ENG	Brooke Nunn
24	FW	NZL	Pia Vlok (scholarship)
25	DF	NZL	Alyssha Eglinton (scholarship)
26	FW	NZL	Lily Brazendale (youth)
27	FW	NZL	Zoe Benson (scholarship)
29	DF	NZL	Freya Des Fountain (youth)
30	DF	USA	Kam Pickett
31	FW	USA	Makala Woods
32	GK	NZL	Brooke Neary (scholarship)
33	GK	NZL	Addie Ferris (youth)

== Transfers ==
=== Transfers in ===
No.	Pos.	Player	From	Type/fee	Contract length	Date	Ref.
30	DF	(United States) Kam Pickett	(Iceland) Fram Reykjavik	Free transfer	1 year	22 July 2026	
6	DF	Abby Erceg	(Mexico) Toluca	Free transfer	1 year	6 August 2026	
13	MF	(Australia) Tameka Yallop	Brisbane Roar	Free transfer	1 year	11 August 2026	
17	FW	Indiah-Paige Riley	Unattached	Free transfer	2 years	26 August 2026	
8	FW	Milly Clegg	(Sweden) Vittsjö GIK	Free transfer	2 years	17 September 2026	
3	DF	Lara Wall	Unattached	Free transfer	1 year	16 October 2026	

==== From academy squad ====
N	Pos.	Nat.	Name	Age	Notes
25	DF	(New Zealand)	Alyssha Eglinton	19	2-year scholarship deal
21	MF	(New Zealand)	Sienna Candy	18	1-year youth development agreement
29	DF	(New Zealand)	Freya Des Fountain	18	1-year youth development agreement
33	GK	(New Zealand)	Addie Ferris	17	1-year youth development agreement

=== Transfers out ===
No.	Pos.	Player	Transferred to	Type/fee	Date	Ref.
25	GK	Harriet Muller	(United States) Incarnate Word Cardinals	End of contract	19 February 2026	
28	FW	Grace Bartlett	(New Zealand) Auckland United	End of contract	26 May 2026	
6	MF	(Netherlands) Tessel Middag	Unattached	End of contract	24 June 2026	
12	DF	Ella McMillan	(New Zealand) Waterside Karori	End of contract	24 June 2026	
14	DF	(Dominican Republic) Lucía León	Unattached	End of contract	24 June 2026	
17	MF	Ela Jerez	(New Zealand) Wellington United	End of contract	24 June 2026	
32	MF	Emma Pijnenburg	(Netherlands) Hera United	End of contract	24 June 2026	
3	DF	(Lebanon) Tiana Jaber	Western Sydney Wanderers	Mutual contract termination	14 July 2026	
15	MF	Daisy Brazendale	Unattached	End of contract	10 August 2026	
21	DF	Lara Wall	Unattached	End of contract	10 August 2026	
30	FW	(United States) Mackenzie Anthony	Unattached	End of contract	10 August 2026	
8	MF	Macey Fraser	Unattached	Mutual contract termination	12 August 2026	
18	FW	Ella McCann	(New Zealand) Eastern Suburbs	End of contract	26 September 2026	

=== Contract extensions ===
No.	Player	Position	Duration	Date	Ref.
1	Victoria Esson	Goalkeeper	1 year	12 June 2026	
22	Aimee Danieli	Goalkeeper	1 year	17 June 2026	
11	Manaia Elliott	Wingback	1 year	13 July 2026	
27	Zoe Benson	Forward	3 years (Note: 3-year contract, first two of which are on scholarship terms)	31 July 2026	
32	Brooke Neary	Goalkeeper	3 years (Note: Scholarship contract)	12 October 2026	
19	Mikaela Bangalan	Midfielder	3 years	12 October 2026	
26	Lily Brazendale	Striker	1 year (Note: Youth development agreement)	17 October 2026	

== Pre-season and friendlies ==
The Phoenix played three confirmed friendlies, securing a 1–0 win over fellow A-League side Western Sydney Wanderers, a 2–0 win over Sydney FC, and a 2–1 win over Women's National League side Eastern Suburbs.

Win Draw Loss Fixtures

29 September 2026	Western Sydney Wanderers (Australia)	0–1	(New Zealand) Wellington Phoenix	Sydney, Australia
		Report	Benson	Attendance: 0 (behind closed doors)
Note: Match was played over three 30-minute periods

3 October 2026	Sydney FC (Australia)	0–2	(New Zealand) Wellington Phoenix	Sydney, Australia
		Report	Benson; Main	Attendance: 0 (behind closed doors)

10 October 2026	Eastern Suburbs (New Zealand)	1–2	(New Zealand) Wellington Phoenix	Auckland, New Zealand
13:00 NZDT	Brooke	Report	Candy; Woods	Stadium: Madills Farm Recreation Reserve

== Competitions ==
=== Overall record ===
Competition	First match	Last match	Starting round	Record							
Competition	First match	Last match	Starting round	Pld	W	D	L	GF	GA	GD	Win %
A-League Women	18 October 2026	3 April 2027	Matchday 1	6	3	1	2	9	6	+3	50.00
Total				6	3	1	2	9	6	+3	50.00

Last updated: As of 20 November 2026.
Source: Competitions

=== A-League Women ===
==== League table ====
Pos	Team	Pld	W	D	L	GF	GA	GD	Pts	Qualification
1	Central Coast Mariners	5	3	1	1	12	5	+7	10	Qualification for AFC Women's Champions League and Finals series
2	Wellington Phoenix (Note: Wellington Phoenix cannot qualify for the AFC Women's Champions League as they are based in New Zealand, which is part of the Oceania Football Confederation.)	6	3	1	2	9	6	+3	10	Qualification for Finals series
3	Perth Glory	5	3	1	1	4	1	+3	10	Qualification for Finals series
4	Melbourne Victory	5	2	2	1	4	4	0	8	Qualification for Finals series
5	Melbourne City	3	2	1	0	8	2	+6	7	Qualification for Finals series

Updated to match(es) played on 20 November 2026. Source: A-Leagues
Rules for classification: 1) points; 2) goal difference; 3) goals scored; 4) wins; 5) head-to-head results; 5a) head-to-head points; 5b) head-to-head goal difference; 6) Fair Play points; 7) away goal difference; 8) away goals per match; 9) home goal difference; 10) home goals per match; 11) toss of a coin in an event of a tie of two clubs.

==== Results summary ====
As of 20 November 2026.

Overall								Home						Away					
Pld	W	D	L	GF	GA	GD	Pts	W	D	L	GF	GA	GD	W	D	L	GF	GA	GD
6	3	1	2	9	6	+3	10	1	1	1	5	4	+1	2	0	1	4	2	+2

==== Results by round ====
Round	1	2	3	4	5	6	7	8	9	10	11	12	13	14	15	16	17	18	19	20	21	22
Ground	H	H	A	A	H	A	A	H	A	A	H	H	A	B	H	H	A	H	A	H	A	B
Result	L	D	L	W	W	W								B								B
Position	8	7	8	6	5	2																
Points	0	1	1	4	7	10																

Updated to match(es) played on 18 October 2026. Source: A-League Women – Standings.
A = Away; H = Home; B = Bye; W = Win; D = Draw; L = Loss

==== Matches ====
The league fixtures were released on 21 August 2026. The Waitangi Day home match against Western Sydney Wanderers is set to be played at Te Kaha in Christchurch, with the match being a double header with the Wellington Phoenix Men playing after the women's team and also against the Wanderers. The Phoenix will have byes in rounds 14 and 22.

Win Draw Loss Fixtures

18 October 2026 1	Wellington Phoenix	1–2	Melbourne City	Wellington
12:15 NZDT	Woods 51'	Report	Ayres 73' (pen.); Hayashi 87'	Stadium: Hnry Stadium; Attendance: 3,695; Referee: Casey Reibelt

25 October 2026 2	Wellington Phoenix	1–1	Melbourne Victory	Wellington
12:15 NZDT	Woods 63'	Report	Furphy 40'	Stadium: Hnry Stadium; Attendance: 1,897; Referee: Sarah Jones

1 November 2026 3	Perth Glory	2–0	Wellington Phoenix	Perth
18:45 AWST (23:45 NZDT)	Tovar 5'; Badawiya 40'	Report		Stadium: HBF Park; Attendance: 1,200; Referee: Mikayla Ryan

6 November 2026 4	Adelaide United	0–2	Wellington Phoenix	Adelaide
18:30 ACDT (21:00 NZDT)		Report	Yallop 15'; Riley 88'	Stadium: Service FM Stadium; Attendance: 634; Referee: Isabella Mossin

15 November 2026 5	Wellington Phoenix	3–1	Sydney FC	Porirua
14:00 NZDT	Riley 6'; Clegg 18' (pen.); Jale 84'	Report	Caspers 77'	Stadium: Jerry Collins Stadium; Attendance: 1,002; Referee: Caitlin Williams

20 November 2026 6	Western Sydney Wanderers	0–2	Wellington Phoenix	Sydney
16:50 AEDT (18:50 NZDT)		Report	Clegg 57'; Woods 90+3'	Stadium: CommBank Stadium Stadium; Referee: Casey Reibelt

12 December 2026 7	Canberra United	v	Wellington Phoenix	Canberra
17:00 AEDT (19:00 NZDT)		Report		Stadium: McKellar Park

20 December 2026 8	Wellington Phoenix	v	Brisbane Roar	Porirua
15:00 NZDT)		Report		Stadium: Jerry Collins Stadium

29 December 2026 9	Melbourne Victory	v	Wellington Phoenix	Melbourne
16:50 AEDT (18:50 NZDT)		Report		Stadium: AAMI Park

1 January 2027 10	Newcastle Jets	v	Wellington Phoenix	Maitland
17:00 AEDT (19:00 NZDT)		Report		Stadium: Maitland Sports Ground

9 January 2027 11	Wellington Phoenix	v	Central Coast Mariners	Porirua
17:00 NZDT		Report		Stadium: Jerry Collins Stadium

16 January 2027 12	Wellington Phoenix	v	Perth Glory	Porirua
17:00 NZDT		Report		Stadium: Jerry Collins Stadium

24 January 2027 13	Melbourne City	v	Wellington Phoenix	Melbourne
17:00 AEDT (19:00 NZDT)		Report		Stadium: ctrl:cyber Pitch

6 February 2027 15	Wellington Phoenix	v	Western Sydney Wanderers	Christchurch
14:15 NZDT		Report		Stadium: One New Zealand Stadium

14 February 2027 16	Wellington Phoenix	v	Adelaide United	Porirua
15:00 NZDT		Report		Stadium: Jerry Collins Stadium

20 February 2027 17	Sydney FC	v	Wellington Phoenix	Wollongong
17:00 AEDT (19:00 NZDT)		Report		Stadium: WIN Stadium

14 March 2027 18	Wellington Phoenix	v	Newcastle Jets	Porirua
15:00 NZDT		Report		Stadium: Jerry Collins Stadium

19 March 2027 19	Brisbane Roar	v	Wellington Phoenix	Brisbane
18:00 AEST (21:00 NZDT)		Report		Stadium: Spencer Park

28 March 2027 20	Wellington Phoenix	v	Canberra United	Porirua
15:00 NZDT		Report		Stadium: Jerry Collins Stadium

3 April 2027 21	Central Coast Mariners	v	Wellington Phoenix	Gosford
15:00 AEDT (17:00 NZDT)		Report		Stadium: polytec Stadium

== Statistics ==
=== Appearances and goals ===
Includes all competitions. Players with no appearances not included in the list.

As of 20 November 2026.

No.	Pos.	Nat.	Player	A-League Women		Total	
No.	Pos.	Nat.	Player	Apps	Goals	Apps	Goals
1	GK	(New Zealand)	Victoria Esson	3	0	3	0
3	DF	(New Zealand)	Lara Wall	0+3	0	3	0
4	DF	(New Zealand)	Mackenzie Barry	4	0	4	0
5	DF	(United States)	Ellie Walker	6	0	6	0
6	DF	(New Zealand)	Abby Erceg	6	0	6	0
7	MF	(New Zealand)	Grace Jale	6	1	6	1
8	FW	(New Zealand)	Milly Clegg	3+1	2	4	2
11	MF	(New Zealand)	Manaia Elliott	2+4	0	6	0
13	MF	(Australia)	Tameka Yallop	6	1	6	1
16	DF	(New Zealand)	Marisa van der Meer	2+1	0	3	0
17	FW	(New Zealand)	Indiah-Paige Riley	5+1	2	6	2
20	FW	(New Zealand)	Emma Taylor-Main	0+6	0	6	0
23	FW	(England)	Brooke Nunn	6	0	6	0
24	FW	(New Zealand)	Pia Vlok	4	0	4	0
25	DF	(New Zealand)	Alyssha Eglinton	1+4	0	5	0
30	DF	(United States)	Kam Pickett	3+1	0	4	0
31	FW	(United States)	Makala Woods	6	3	6	3
32	GK	(New Zealand)	Brooke Neary	3	0	3	0

=== Disciplinary record ===
Includes all competitions. The list is sorted by squad number when total cards are equal. Players with no cards not included in the list.

As of 20 November 2026.

Rank	No.	Pos.	Nat.	Name	A-League Women			Total		
Rank	No.	Pos.	Nat.	Name	Yellow card	(yellow card) (yellow-red card)	Red card	Yellow card	(yellow card) (yellow-red card)	Red card
1	5	DF	(United States)	Ellie Walker	1	0	0	1	0	0
1	7	MF	(New Zealand)	Grace Jale	1	0	0	1	0	0
1	13	MF	(Australia)	Tameka Yallop	1	0	0	1	0	0
1	23	FW	(England)	Brooke Nunn	1	0	0	1	0	0
Total					4	0	0	4	0	0

=== Clean sheets ===
Includes all competitions. The list is sorted by squad number when total clean sheets are equal. Numbers in parentheses represent games where both goalkeepers participated and both kept a clean sheet; the number in parentheses is awarded to the goalkeeper who was substituted on, whilst a full clean sheet is awarded to the goalkeeper who was on the field at the start of play. Goalkeepers with no clean sheets not included in the list.

As of 20 November 2026.

Rank	No.	Nat.	Goalkeeper	A-League Women	Total
1	32	(New Zealand)	Brooke Neary	2	2
Total				2	2

== See also ==
- 2026–27 Wellington Phoenix FC season
