= Makala Woods =

American soccer player (born 2002)

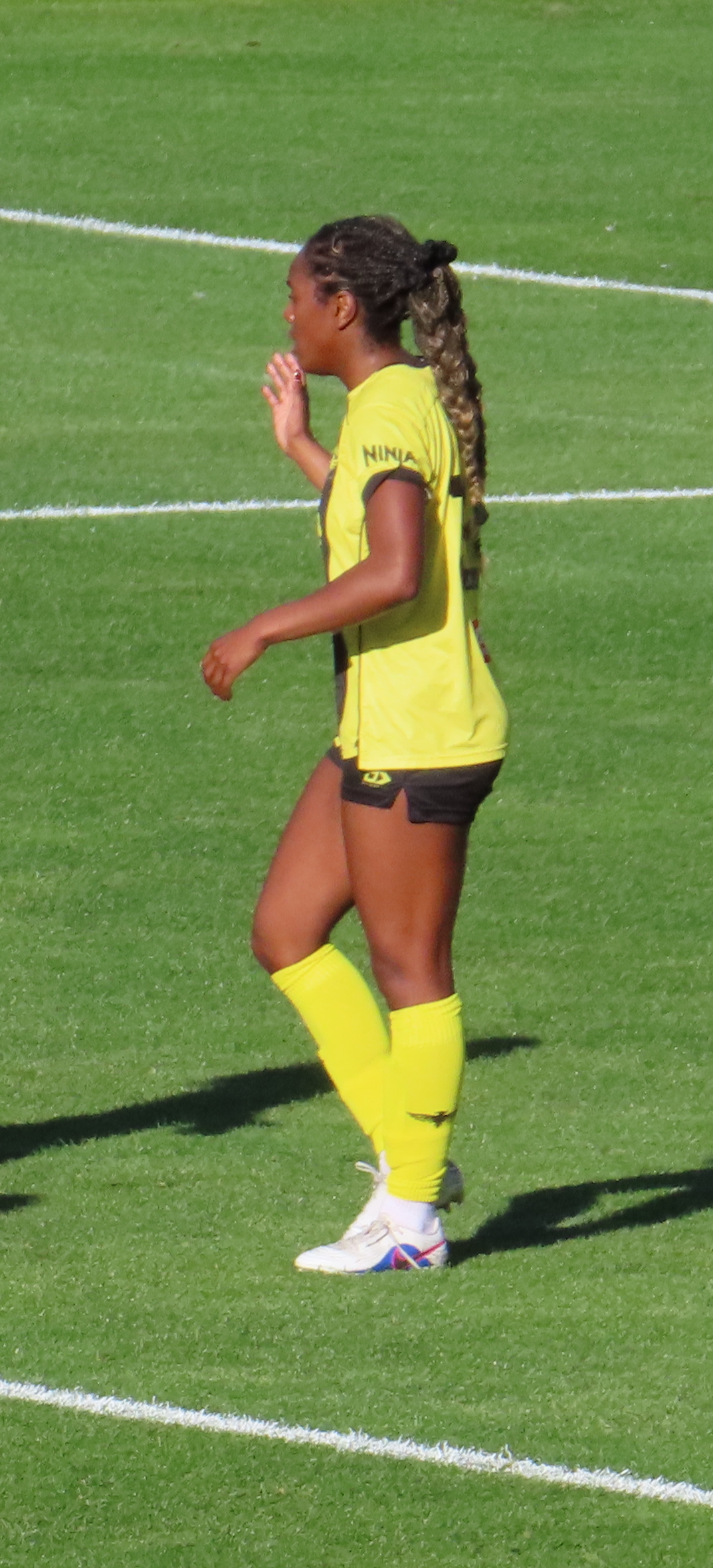
- Woods playing for the Wellington Phoenix in 2026.

Personal information
- Full name: Makala Alexandria Woods
- Date of birth: September 4, 2002 (age 24)
- Place of birth: Monroe, Ohio, United States
- Height: 1.68 m (5 ft 6 in)
- Position: Forward

Team information
- Current team: Wellington Phoenix
- Number: 31

College career
Years	Team	Apps	(Gls)
2020–2023	Illinois	40	(6)
2024	Kentucky	21	(11)

Senior career*
Years	Team	Apps	(Gls)
2025	Tindastóll	21	(9)
2026–	Wellington Phoenix	15	(8)
- * Club domestic league appearances and goals as of May 23, 2026

Makala Alexandria Woods (born September 4, 2002) is an American professional soccer player who plays as a forward for New Zealand club Wellington Phoenix of the A-League Women. She previously played for Tindastóll of the Icelandic 1. deild kvenna before joining the Wellington Phoenix in January 2026. Woods played college soccer for the University of Illinois and University of Kentucky.

== Early life ==
Woods was born on September 4, 2002, in Monroe, Ohio, United States. She attended Monroe High School.

== College career ==
Woods played four seasons of college soccer as part of the University of Illinois' Illinois Fighting Illini team from 2020 to 2023. She made her college debut on February 18, 2021, away to Purdue. In 2022, she made 18 appearances and scored 3 goals. In her final year for the Illini in 2023, she made 17 appearances, scored 3 goals, and made 3 assists.

As a graduate student in 2024, Woods transferred to the University of Kentucky and played for the Kentucky Wildcats. She started all 21 matches, led the team in scoring with 11 goals, and made 1 assist. Woods won the Southeastern Conference Newcomer of the Year.

== Club career ==
=== Tindastóll ===
In 2025, Woods signed her first professional contract for Tindastóll of the 1. deild kvenna in Iceland. Woods made 21 appearances and scored 9 goals for Tindastóll.

=== Wellington Phoenix ===
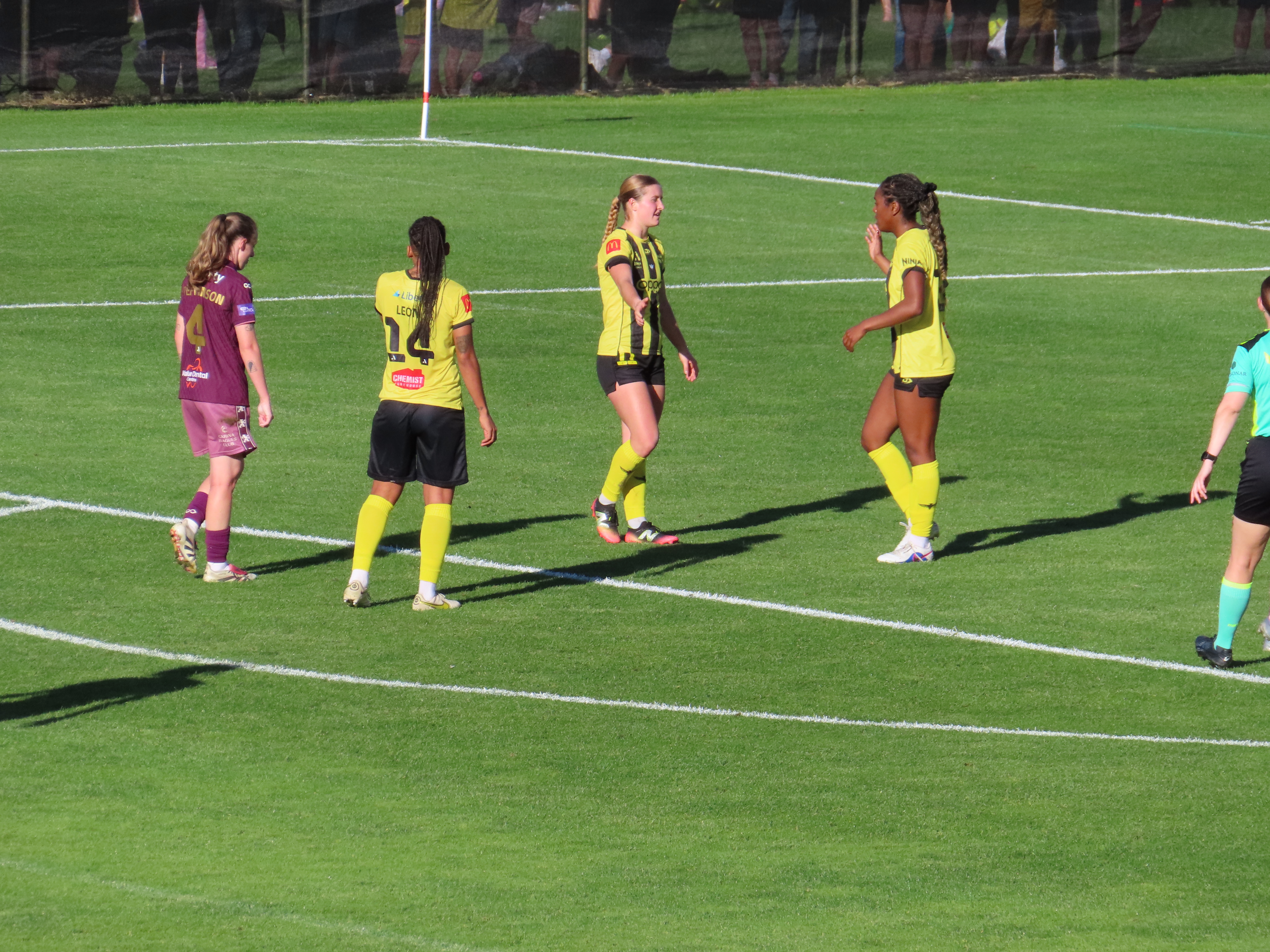
Woods playing for the Wellington Phoenix alongside Manaia Elliott and Lucia Leon in May 2026.

Following a season-ending injury to Dutch midfielder Tessel Middag, New Zealand A-League Women club Wellington Phoenix signed Woods for the remainder of the 2025–26 season. Woods scored her first goal for the Phoenix on debut on January 10, 2026, in a 2–1 home loss against Melbourne City. On January 25, Woods scored one goal and made one assist in a 3–1 home win against Adelaide United.

On February 1, Woods made three assists in one match in a 5–1 away win against the Newcastle Jets, assisting Pia Vlok twice and Emma Pijnenburg once.

On March 12, the Wellington Phoenix re-signed Woods as well as Englishwoman Brooke Nunn for a further 1-year contract until the end of the 2026–27 season. This was the first time in the Phoenix's history that import players had re-signed for the club. Head coach Bev Priestman praised Woods' performance for the Phoenix, saying she can finish, help other players, is quick, powerful, and capable of defending.

During the regular season, Woods made 12 appearances and scored 5 goals. For the first time in their history, the Phoenix made the A-League Women playoffs. In the two-legged semifinal, Wellington lost their first match 2–1 away to Brisbane Roar. In the return leg, Woods scored both goals in a 2–0 victory for the Phoenix, helping the club win the tie 3–2 on aggregate and thereby qualifying them for their first ever grand final.

In the postseason, Woods was selected for the A-Leagues All Stars Women team that will play against Women's Super League (WSL) club Chelsea in the 2026 game at Allianz Stadium in Moore Park, Sydney as part of the 2026 Sydney Super Cup.

== Honors ==
=== Individual ===
University of Kentucky Wildcats

- Southeastern Conference Newcomer of the Year Award: 2024.
