= Ellie Walker =

American soccer player (born 1999)

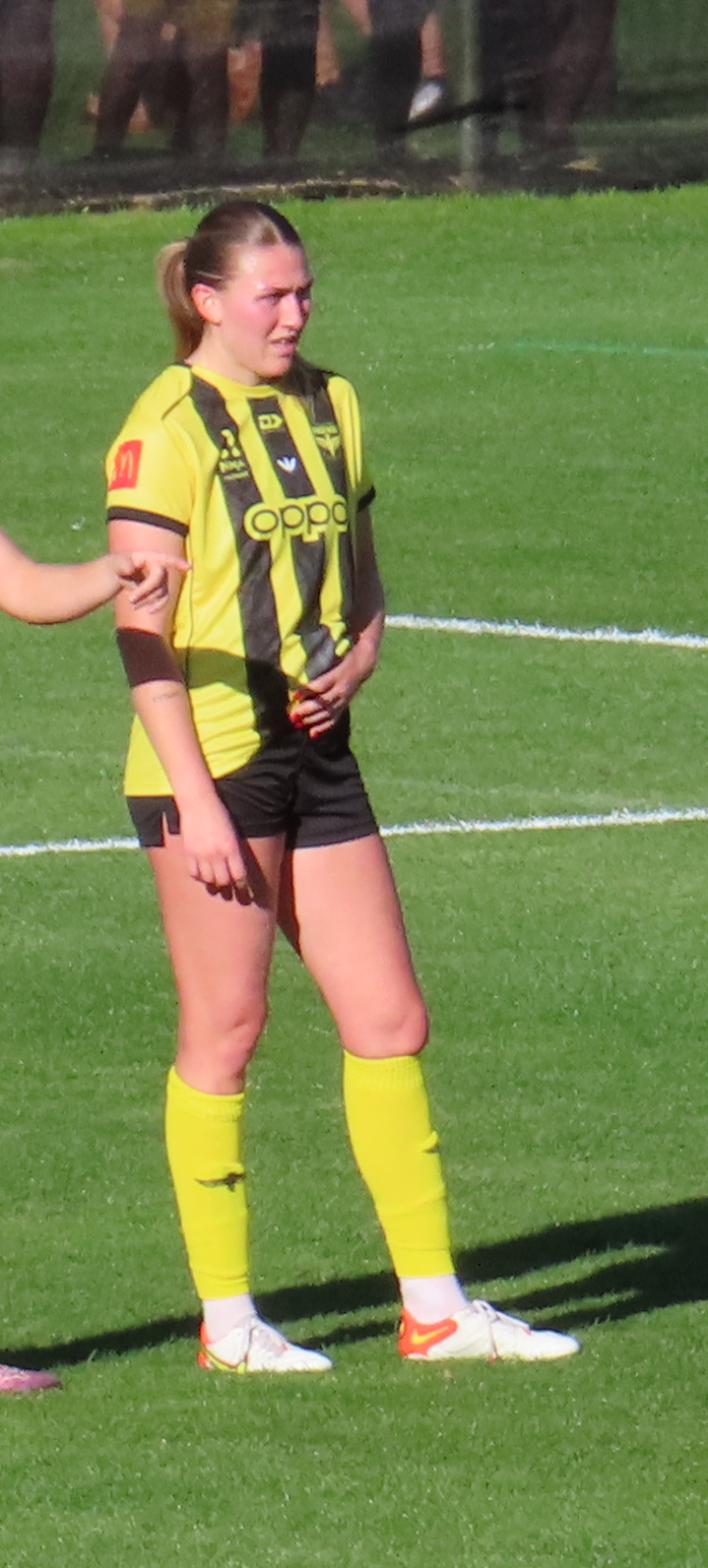
- Walker playing for the Wellington Phoenix in 2026.

Personal information
- Full name: Ellie Delane Walker
- Date of birth: June 12, 1999 (age 27)
- Place of birth: Portland, Oregon, United States
- Height: 1.80 m (5 ft 11 in)
- Position: Defender

Team information
- Current team: Wellington Phoenix
- Number: 5

College career
| Years | Team | Apps | (Gls) |
| 2017–2021 | Portland | 82 | (2) |

Senior career*
| Years | Team | Apps | (Gls) |
| 2022–2024 | Torreense | 44 | (3) |
| 2024–2025 | S.C. Braga | 19 | (0) |
| 2025– | Wellington Phoenix | 23 | (1) |
- * Club domestic league appearances and goals as of May 23, 2026

Ellie Walker (born June 12, 1999) is an American professional soccer player who plays as a defender for New Zealand club Wellington Phoenix of the A-League Women. She previously played for Torreense and S.C. Braga of the Portuguese Campeonato Nacional Feminino before joining the Wellington Phoenix in June 2025. Walker played college soccer for the University of Portland.

== Early life ==
Walker was born on June 12, 1999, in Portland, Oregon, United States. She was born to Robyn and John, with John having played college basketball for Lewis–Clark State College. Walker attended Columbia River High School in Vancouver, Washington.

== College career ==
=== University of Portland ===
On August 18, 2017, Walker made her debut for the University of Portland in a 2–1 win against Portland State. Walker scored her first goal for the Pilots in a 1–0 on October 21, 2017, against Gonzaga. Across five seasons from 2017 to 2021, Walker made 82 appearances and scored 2 goals. She graduated and majored in political science.

== Club career ==
=== Torreense ===
In 2022, Walker signed for Torreense of the Portuguese Campeonato Nacional Feminino, where she played two seasons. During the 2022–23 season, Walker made 22 appearances in the league and scored 1 goal. Walker's first professional goal came in a 2–2 draw against Marítimo on March 19, 2023. She also made 1 appearance in the Taça de Portugal and 2 in the Taça da Liga.

The following season Walker made 22 appearances and scored 2 goals in the league, alongside 2 appearances each in the Taça de Portugal and Taça da Liga.

=== Braga ===
S.C. Braga signed Walker for the 2024–25 season. She made her debut for the club on September 1, 2024, playing 90 minutes in a 6–1 win against FC Famalicão. Walker made 18 league appearances, 4 appearances in the Taça de Portugal, and 2 appearances in the Taça da Liga, scoring one goal in the latter. Walker helped the club qualify for the UEFA Women's Champions League after the club finished in third place.

=== Wellington Phoenix ===
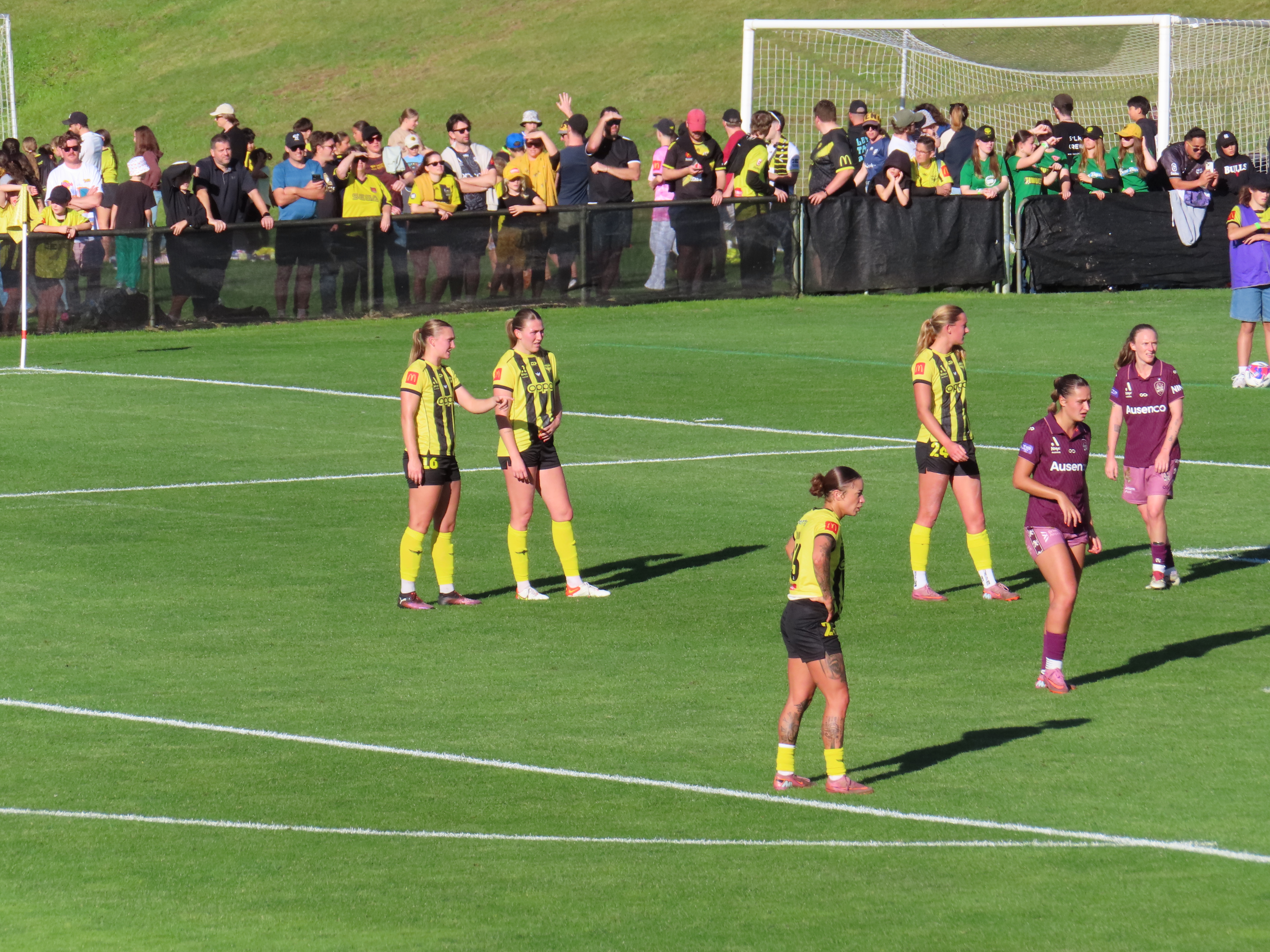
Walker, Marisa van der Meer, Pia Vlok, and Brooke Nunn preparing for a corner kick in May 2026 for the Wellington Phoenix FC.

On June 12, 2025, New Zealand-based club Wellington Phoenix of the Australian A-League Women signed Walker on a one-year contract until the end of the 2025–26 season. Walker made her debut for the club on November 8, 2025, in the season opener, with the Phoenix playing out a 1–1 draw against Canberra United. On February 1, 2026, Walker scored her first goal for the Phoenix in a 5–1 away win against the Newcastle Jets, wherein teammates Emma Pijnenburg also scored her first club goal and Pia Vlok scored the club's first hat-trick. Walker played in all 20 regular season A-League Women matches, in a campaign in which Wellington finished runners-up and qualified for their first ever A-League Women Finals.

On March 27, 2026, the Wellington Phoenix re-signed Walker for the 2026–27 season. Head coach Bev Priestman praised Walker for her contributions stating, "Her defensive qualities and aggression to help us win the ball back have been fantastic. She has also made our right-hand side attack tick with her technical ability on the ball, and she is a threat in the box for us as well. And Ellie's leadership and communication are a major asset to the team."
