= 2021–22 Melbourne City FC (women) season =

7th season in existence of Melbourne City FC (women)

Melbourne City (A-League Women)
2021–22 season
- Owner: City Football Group
- Chairman: Khaldoon Al Mubarak
- Manager: Rado Vidošić
- Stadium: AAMI Park; Kingston Heath Soccer Complex; ABD Stadium
- A-League Women: 2nd
- A-League Women Finals: Preliminary Final
- Top goalscorer: League: Hannah Wilkinson (12); All: Hannah Wilkinson (14)
- Highest home attendance: 7,896 vs. Adelaide United (18 December 2021); A-League Women
- Lowest home attendance: 357 vs. Newcastle Jets (1 March 2022); A-League Women
- Average home league attendance: 1,869
- Biggest win: 5–1 vs. Melbourne Victory (A) (26 December 2021); A-League Women; 4–0 vs. Wellington Phoenix (H) (9 January 2022); A-League Women; 4–0 vs. Perth Glory (A) (13 February 2022); A-League Women
- Biggest defeat: 0–3 vs. Sydney FC (A) (22 January 2022); A-League Women
Home colours	Away colours	Third colours

The 2021–22 season was the seventh in the history of Melbourne City Football Club (A-League Women). They were managed by Rado Vidošić.

== Players ==
=== First-team squad ===
Note: Flags indicate national team as defined under FIFA eligibility rules; some limited exceptions apply. Players may hold more than one non-FIFA nationality.

No.	Pos.	Nation	Player
1	GK	AUS	Sally James
2	DF	NZL	Marisa van der Meer
3	MF	AUS	Darcey Malone
4	DF	AUS	Chelsea Blissett
5	DF	AUS	Tori Tumeth
6	MF	AUS	Leticia McKenna
7	DF	AUS	Winonah Heatley
8	DF	AUS	Kaitlyn Torpey
9	FW	AUS	Holly McNamara
10	MF	AUS	Rhianna Pollicina
11	DF	AUS	Isabella Accardo

No.	Pos.	Nation	Player
12	GK	AUS	Coco Majstorovic
13	DF	NZL	Rebekah Stott
15	DF	AUS	Emma Checker (captain)
16	MF	AUS	Meisha Westland
17	FW	NZL	Hannah Wilkinson
18	MF	AUS	Leah Davidson
19	DF	SRB	Tyla-Jay Vlajnic
20	FW	AUS	Caitlin Karic
22	DF	AUS	Naomi Thomas-Chinnama
23	GK	AUS	Melissa Barbieri

== Transfers ==
=== Transfers in ===
No.	Position	Player	Transferred from	Type/fee	Contract length	Date	Ref.
13	DF	(New Zealand) Rebekah Stott	(Australia) Bulleen Lions	Free transfer	1 year	19 August 2021	
17	FW	(New Zealand) Hannah Wilkinson	(Germany) MSV Duisburg	Free transfer	1 year	25 August 2021	
10	FW	Rhianna Pollicina	Newcastle Jets	Free transfer		1 September 2021	
8	MF	Kaitlyn Torpey	Brisbane Roar	Free transfer	1 year	9 September 2021	
1	GK	Sally James	Canberra United	Free transfer	1 year	15 September 2021	
20	FW	Caitlin Karic	(Australia) FV Emerging	Free transfer	1 year	17 September 2021	
3	MF	Darcey Malone	(Australia) FNSW Institute	Free transfer		17 September 2021	
9	FW	Holly McNamara	(Australia) FNSW Institute	Free transfer		17 September 2021	
6	MF	Leticia McKenna	Brisbane Roar	Free transfer		30 September 2021	
2	DF	(New Zealand) Marisa van der Meer	(New Zealand) Canterbury United Pride	Free transfer	1 year	1 October 2021	
16	MF	Meisha Westland	(Australia) Lions FC	Free transfer	1 year	1 October 2021	
7	DF	Winonah Heatley	(Sweden) Växjö	Free transfer	1 year	29 November 2021	
12	GK	Coco Majstorovic	(Australia) Lions FC	Undisclosed fee		30 November 2021	
11	DF	Isabella Accardo	(Australia) FV Emerging	Scholarship		30 November 2021	

=== Transfers out ===
No.	Position	Player	Transferred from	Type/fee	Date	Ref.
6	MF	(Norway) Noor Eckhoff	(Sweden) Eskilstuna United	Free transfer	8 April 2021	
7	DF	Julia Sardo	(Australia) Calder United	Free transfer	12 April 2021	
20	MF	Lia Muldeary	(Australia) FV Emerging	Free transfer	3 May 2021	
1	GK	Teegan Micah	(Norway) Sandviken	Free transfer	4 May 2021	
9	MF	Alex Chidiac	(Japan) JEF United Chiba	Undisclosed fee	8 June 2021	
10	FW	(Japan) Chinatsu Kira	(Japan) Orca Kamogawa	Free transfer	16 June 2021	
13	MF	Sarah Cain	Perth Glory	Free transfer	21 July 2021	
16	DF	Sofia Sakalis	Perth Glory	Free transfer	21 July 2021	
17	DF	(United States) Samantha Johnson	(France) Soyaux	Free transfer	30 July 2021	
21	DF	Jenna McCormick	(Denmark) AGF Fodbold	Undisclosed fee	20 August 2021	
2	DF	Teigen Allen	Western Sydney Wanderers	Free transfer	24 August 2021	
8	MF	Hollie Palmer	Brisbane Roar	Free transfer	25 August 2021	
14	MF	(France) Margot Robinne	Canberra United	Free transfer	28 September 2021	
12	FW	Harriet Withers	Melbourne Victory	Undisclosed fee	29 September 2021	
30	GK	Sophia Varley	Melbourne Victory	Undisclosed fee	5 December 2021	

=== Contract extensions ===
No.	Position	Player	Duration	Date	Ref.
15	DF	Emma Checker	2 years	24 August 2021	
4	DF	Chelsea Blissett	3 years	27 August 2021	
18	MF	Leah Davidson	2 years	3 September 2021	
5	DF	Tori Tumeth	2 years	7 September 2021	
22	DF	Naomi Thomas-Chinnama	2 years	10 September 2021	
23	GK	Melissa Barbieri	1 year	23 September 2021	
19	DF	(Serbia) Tyla-Jay Vlajnic	1 year	28 September 2021	

== Competitions ==
=== Overall record ===
Competition	First match	Last match	Starting round	Final position	Record							
Competition	First match	Last match	Starting round	Final position	Pld	W	D	L	GF	GA	GD	Win %
A-League Women	3 December 2021	6 March 2022	Matchday 1	2nd	14	11	0	3	29	11	+18	78.57
A-League Women Finals	11 March 2022	20 March 2022	Semi-finals	Preliminary Final	2	0	0	2	3	7	−4	0.00
Total					16	11	0	5	32	18	+14	68.75

Source: Soccerway

=== A-League Women ===
==== Results summary ====
Overall								Home						Away					
Pld	W	D	L	GF	GA	GD	Pts	W	D	L	GF	GA	GD	W	D	L	GF	GA	GD
14	11	0	3	29	11	+18	33	5	0	2	14	6	+8	6	0	1	15	5	+10

Source: KEEPUP

==== Results by round ====
Round	1	2	3	4	6	7	12	9	10	11	8	13	5	14
Ground	A	H	H	A	H	A	A	A	H	A	H	H	H	A
Result	W	L	W	W	W	W	L	W	W	W	W	L	W	W
Position	4	5	3	2	2	2	2	2	2	2	2	3	2	2
Points	3	3	6	9	12	15	15	18	21	24	27	27	30	33

Source: A-Leagues
A = Away; H = Home; W = Win; D = Draw; L = Loss

==== League table ====
Pos	Team	Pld	W	D	L	GF	GA	GD	Pts	Qualification
1	Sydney FC	14	11	2	1	36	6	+30	35	Qualification to Finals series
2	Melbourne City	14	11	0	3	29	11	+18	33	Qualification to Finals series
3	Adelaide United	14	9	0	5	33	18	+15	27	Qualification to Finals series
4	Melbourne Victory (C)	14	7	3	4	26	22	+4	24	Qualification to Finals series
5	Perth Glory	14	7	3	4	20	23	−3	24	
6	Brisbane Roar	14	5	2	7	29	30	−1	17	
7	Canberra United	14	2	7	5	24	29	−5	13	
8	Newcastle Jets	14	2	4	8	15	30	−15	10	
9	Western Sydney Wanderers	14	1	4	9	7	27	−20	7	
10	Wellington Phoenix	14	2	1	11	13	36	−23	7	

Source: A-Leagues
Rules for classification: 1) points; 2) goal difference; 3) number of goals scored.
(C) Champions

==== Matches ====
Win Draw Loss

3 December 2021 1	Canberra United	0–1	Melbourne City	Canberra
19:45 AEDT		Report	McNamara 80'	Stadium: Viking Park; Attendance: 1,237; Referee: Georgia Ghirardello

12 December 2021 2	Melbourne City	1–2	Melbourne Victory	Melbourne
16:05 AEDT	Jackson 49' (o.g.)	Report	Zimmerman 65'; Williams 70'	Stadium: AAMI Park; Attendance: 1,092; Referee: Casey Reibelt

18 December 2021 3	Melbourne City	3–1	Adelaide United	Melbourne
17:05 AEDT	Pollicina 38'; Wilkinson 40', 90+4'	Report	Dawber 65'	Stadium: AAMI Park; Attendance: 7,896; Referee: Rachael Mitchenson

26 December 2021 4	Melbourne Victory	1–5	Melbourne City	Melbourne
17:05 AEDT	Markovski 84'	Report	Wilkinson 5', 13', 26', 56', 75'	Stadium: AAMI Park; Attendance: 4,682; Referee: Lara Lee

9 January 2022 6	Melbourne City	4–0	Wellington Phoenix	Melbourne
16:05 AEDT	Torpey 29'; Wilkinson 43'; Heatley 48'; Checker 78'	Report		Stadium: AAMI Park; Attendance: 1,021; Referee: Caitlin Williams

15 January 2022 7	Adelaide United	0–1	Melbourne City	Adelaide
16:35 ACDT		Report	Pollicina 66'	Stadium: Coopers Stadium; Attendance: 2,062; Referee: Georgia Ghirardello

22 January 2022 12	Sydney FC	3–0	Melbourne City	Sydney
17:05 AEDT	Satchell 33'; Lowe 44', 74'	Report		Stadium: Netsrata Jubilee Stadium; Attendance: 1,259; Referee: Rachael Mitchenson

29 January 2022 9	Brisbane Roar	1–2	Melbourne City	Brisbane
16:50 AEDT	Gorry 71' (pen.)	Report	Pollicina 79'; Wilkinson 90+4'	Stadium: Kayo Stadium; Attendance: 1,132; Referee: Rebecca Mackie

6 February 2022 10	Melbourne City	2–1	Western Sydney Wanderers	Melbourne
16:05 AEDT	Pollcina 28'; McNamara 45'	Report	Collister 47'	Stadium: AAMI Park; Attendance: 840; Referee: Rachael Mitchenson

13 February 2022 11	Perth Glory	0–4	Melbourne City	Gosford
15:05 AEDT		Report	Pollicina 48'; McNamara 61', 88'; Wilkinson 90+4'	Stadium: Industree Group Stadium; Attendance: 362; Referee: Lara Lee

20 February 2022 8	Melbourne City	2–1	Sydney FC	Melbourne
16:05 AEDT	Pollicina 13'; Torpey 46'	Report	Ibini-Isei 79' (pen.)	Stadium: AAMI Park; Attendance: 1,019; Referee: Casey Reibelt

24 February 2022 13	Melbourne City	0–1	Brisbane Roar	Melbourne
19:45 AEDT		Report	Hecher 26'	Stadium: Kingston Heath Soccer Complex; Attendance: 857; Referee: Kelly Jones

1 March 2022 5	Melbourne City	2–0	Newcastle Jets	Melbourne
19:05 AEDT	Torpey 16'; Wilkinson 49'	Report		Stadium: ABD Stadium; Attendance: 357; Referee: Caitlin Williams

6 March 2022 14	Western Sydney Wanderers	0–2	Melbourne City	Sydney
12:05 AEDT		Report	Pollicina 21'; Wilkinson 73'	Stadium: Wanderers Football Park; Attendance: 220; Referee: Georgia Ghirardello

==== Finals series ====
11 March 2022 Semi-finals	Sydney FC	4–2 (a.e.t.)	Melbourne City	Sydney
19:05 AEDT	Vine 73', 113'; Rojas 90+1'; Hunter 96'	Report	Wilkinson 21', 58'	Stadium: Netstrata Jubilee Stadium; Attendance: 942; Referee: Georgia Ghirardello

20 March 2022 Preliminary Final	Melbourne City	1–3	Melbourne Victory	Melbourne
16:05 AEDT	Tumeth 80'	Report	Ayres 30'; Bunge 47'; Privitelli 53'	Stadium: AAMI Park; Attendance: 1,306; Referee: Casey Reibelt

== Statistics ==
=== Appearances and goals ===
Includes all competitions. Players with no appearances not included in the list.

No.	Pos.	Nat.	Name	A-League Women		Total	
No.	Pos.	Nat.	Name	Apps	Goals	Apps	Goals
1	GK	(Australia)	Sally James	1+3	0	4	0
2	DF	(New Zealand)	Marisa van der Meer	0+10	0	10	0
3	DF	(Australia)	Darcey Malone	2+7	0	9	0
4	DF	(Australia)	Chelsea Blissett	4+9	0	13	0
5	DF	(Australia)	Tori Tumeth	15+1	1	16	1
6	MF	(Australia)	Leticia McKenna	5+7	0	12	0
7	DF	(Australia)	Winonah Heatley	15	1	15	1
8	MF	(Australia)	Kaitlyn Torpey	16	3	16	3
9	FW	(Australia)	Holly McNamara	8	4	8	4
10	MF	(Australia)	Rhianna Pollicina	16	7	16	7
11	DF	(Australia)	Isabella Accardo	0+1	0	1	0
12	GK	(Australia)	Coco Majstorovic	0+1	0	1	0
13	DF	(New Zealand)	Rebekah Stott	13	0	13	0
15	DF	(Australia)	Emma Checker	16	1	16	1
16	MF	(Australia)	Meisha Westland	3+9	0	12	0
17	FW	(New Zealand)	Hannah Wilkinson	14	14	14	14
18	MF	(Australia)	Leah Davidson	16	3	16	3
19	DF	(Serbia)	Tyla-Jay Vlajnic	13+2	0	15	0
20	FW	(Australia)	Caitlin Karic	2+7	0	9	0
22	DF	(Australia)	Naomi Thomas-Chinnama	2+4	0	6	0
23	GK	(Australia)	Melissa Barbieri	15	0	15	0

=== Disciplinary record ===
Includes all competitions. The list is sorted by squad number when total cards are equal. Players with no cards not included in the list.

Rank	No.	Pos.	Nat.	Name	A-League Women			Total		
Rank	No.	Pos.	Nat.	Name	Booked	(yellow card) (yellow-red card)	Sent off (straight red)	Booked	(yellow card) (yellow-red card)	Sent off (straight red)
1	19	DF	(Serbia)	Tyla-Jay Vlajnic	3	0	1	3	0	1
2	23	GK	(Australia)	Melissa Barbieri	1	0	1	1	0	1
4	8	MF	(Australia)	Kaitlyn Torpey	2	0	0	2	0	0
4	20	FW	(Australia)	Caitlin Karic	2	0	0	2	0	0
6	3	MF	(Australia)	Darcey Malone	1	0	0	1	0	0
6	5	DF	(Australia)	Tori Tumeth	1	0	0	1	0	0
6	9	FW	(Australia)	Holly McNamara	1	0	0	1	0	0
6	10	FW	(Australia)	Rhianna Pollicina	1	0	0	1	0	0
6	15	DF	(Australia)	Emma Checker	1	0	0	1	0	0
6	16	FW	(Australia)	Meisha Westland	1	0	0	1	0	0
6	18	MF	(Australia)	Leah Davidson	1	0	0	1	0	0
Total					14	0	2	14	0	2

=== Clean sheets ===
Includes all competitions. The list is sorted by squad number when total clean sheets are equal. Numbers in parentheses represent games where both goalkeepers participated and both kept a clean sheet; the number in parentheses is awarded to the goalkeeper who was substituted on, whilst a full clean sheet is awarded to the goalkeeper who was on the field at the start of play. Goalkeepers with no clean sheets not included in the list.

Rank	No.	Nat.	Goalkeeper	A-League Women	Total
1	23	(Australia)	Melissa Barbieri	6	6
2	1	(Australia)	Sally Jones	0 (2)	0 (2)
Total				6 (2)	6 (2)
