= Brooke Nunn =

English footballer (born 1993)

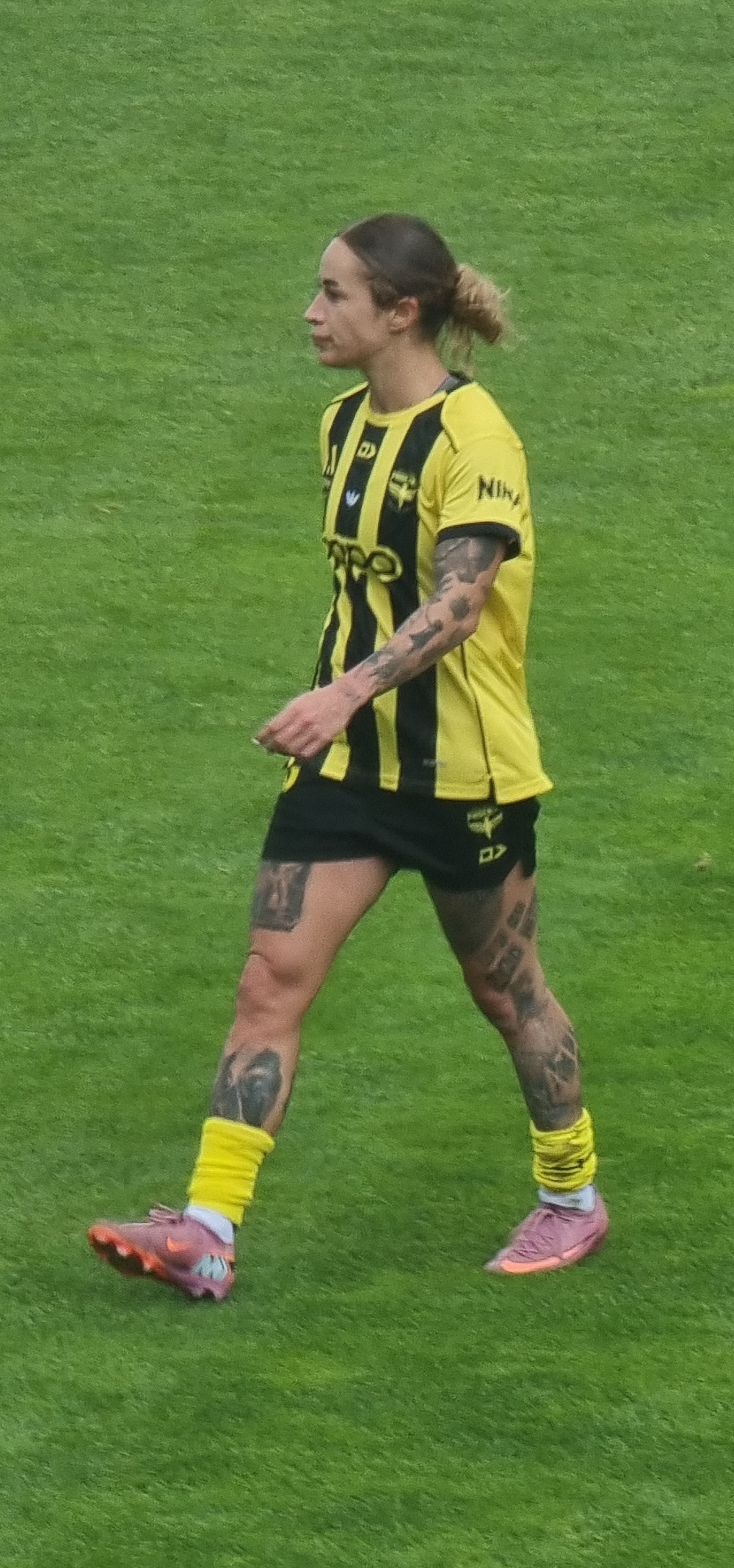
- Nunn playing for Wellington Phoenix in 2026.

Personal information
- Full name: Brooke Georgina Nunn
- Date of birth: 4 February 1993 (age 33)
- Place of birth: England
- Height: 1.65 m (5 ft 5 in)
- Positions: Midfielder; winger; forward

Team information
- Current team: Wellington Phoenix
- Number: 23

Senior career*
Years	Team	Apps	(Gls)
–2014	Arsenal		
2011–2012	→ Watford (loan)		
2018–2021	London Bees	29	(1)
2021–2022	London City Lionesses	14	(2)
2022	Altay	4	(1)
2023–2024	Hibernian	28	(5)
2024	→ Motherwell (loan)	11	(1)
2024–2025	Central Coast Mariners	27	(4)
2025–	Wellington Phoenix	23	(6)
- * Club domestic league appearances and goals as of 23 May 2026

Brooke Georgina Nunn (born 4 February 1993) is an English professional footballer who plays as a midfielder, winger, or forward for Wellington Phoenix of the A-League Women.

== Early life ==
Nunn was born on 4 February 1993. Born in England, she is of Nigerian and German descent through her mother.

== Career ==
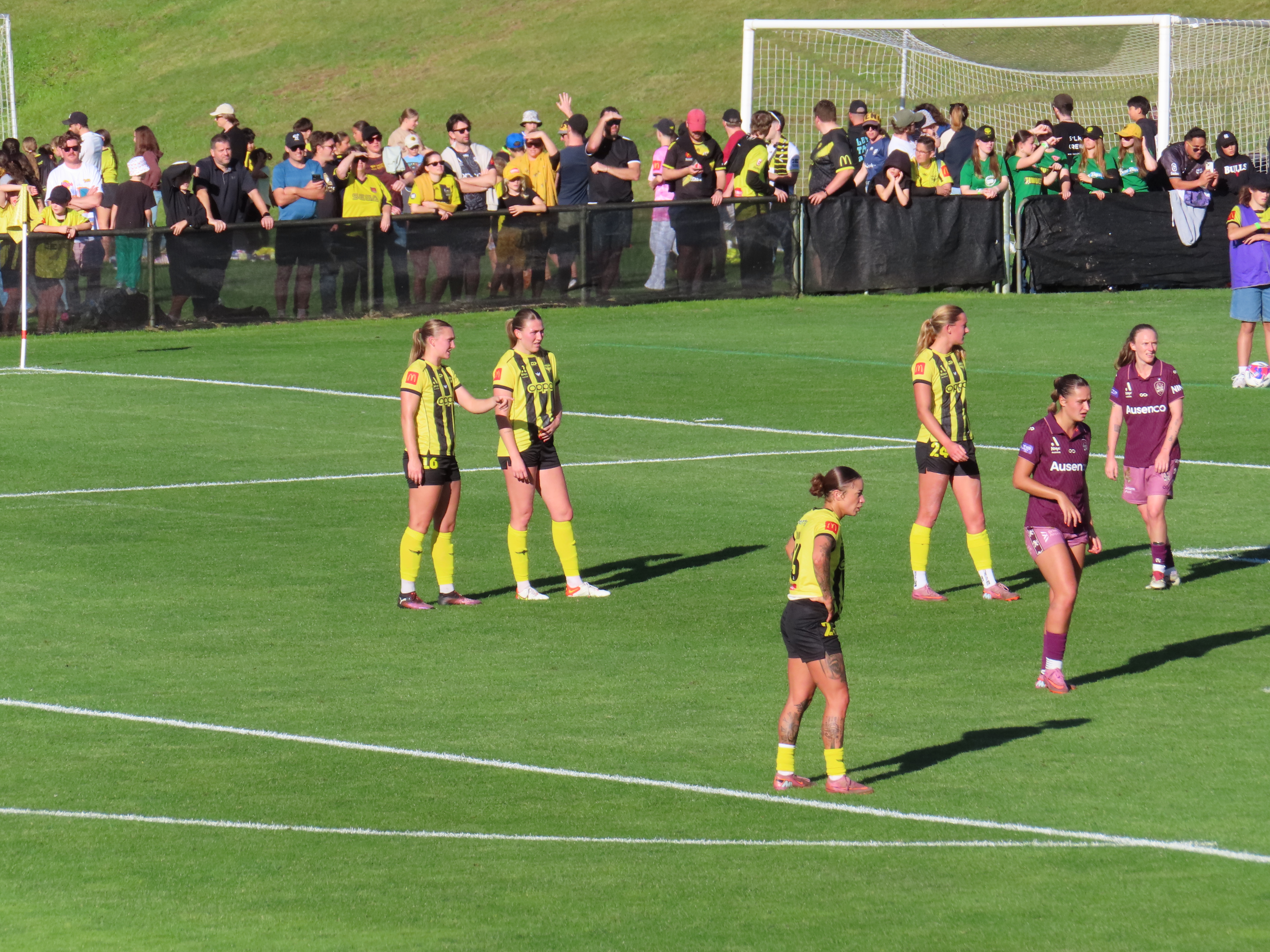
Nunn, Marisa van der Meer, Pia Vlok, and Ellie Walker preparing for a corner kick in May 2026 for the Wellington Phoenix.

Nunn started her career with English side Arsenal WFC, helping the club win the 2010–11 FA Women's Cup. In 2011, she was sent on loan to English side Watford FC. Seven years later, she signed for English side London Bees, where she made twenty-nine league appearances and scored one goal. Ahead of the 2021–22 season, she signed for English side London City Lionesses, helping the club achieve second place in the league.

One year later, she signed for Turkish side Altay SK, where she made four league appearances and scored one goal. During the summer of 2023, she signed for Scottish side Hibernian WFC, where she made twenty-eight league appearances and scored five goals. Subsequently, she signed for Scottish side Motherwell FC in 2024, where she made eleven league appearances and scored one goal. Following her stint there, she signed for Australian side Central Coast Mariners FC, helping the club win the league title.

=== Wellington Phoenix ===
On 24 October 2025, Nunn was signed by New Zealand club Wellington Phoenix on a one-year contract through to the end of the 2025–26 season. During the regular season, Nunn made 20 appearances and scored 6 goals, becoming the Phoenix's golden boot for the season alongside Pia Vlok. Following a successful season with Wellington, the club renewed Nunn on a one-year contract for the 2026–27 season. She and Makala Woods became the first international players to have their contracts renewed for a second season with the Phoenix Women.

In the postseason, Nunn was selected for the A-Leagues All Stars Women team that will play against Women's Super League (WSL) club Chelsea in the 2026 game at Allianz Stadium in Moore Park, Sydney as part of the 2026 Sydney Super Cup.

== Style of play ==
Nunn plays as a midfielder, winger, or forward. Australian news website Impetus Football wrote in 2025 that she "brings energy, creativity, and experience to the... attack. She’s known for her flair and ability to beat defenders one-on-one, using sharp footwork and clever movement to find space and create chances... thrives on frustrating her opponents, often drawing fouls and forcing errors through relentless pressure".

== Honours ==
Central Coast Mariners

- A-League Women Championship: 2025.
