= List of A-League Women grand finals =

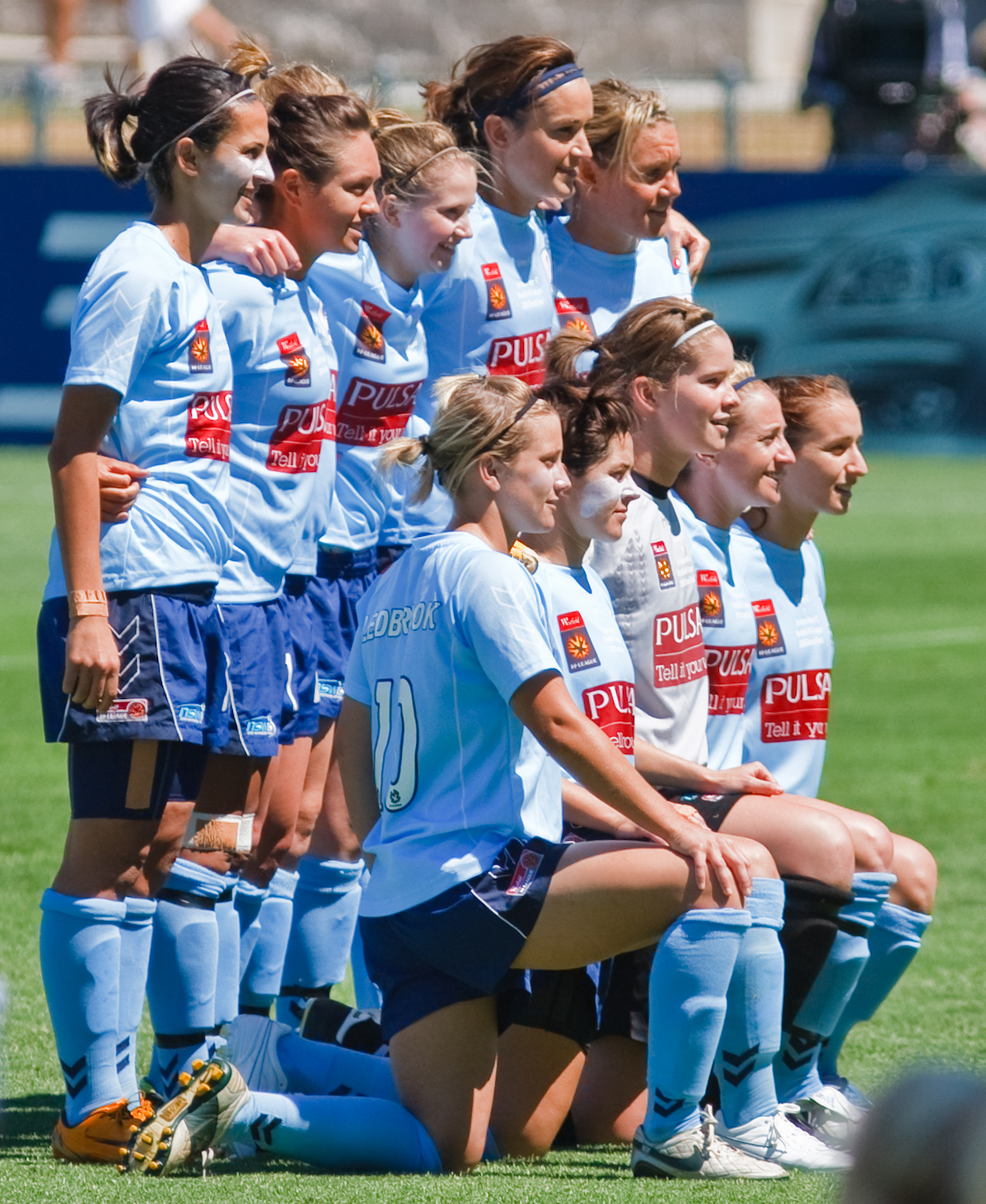
The Sydney FC team before their success in the 2010 W-League Grand Final.

A-League Women, known as the W-League before the 2021–22 season, is an association football competition organised by Football Australia. It is the highest level of women's club football in Australia. The competition is held between 11 teams from across Australia and one in New Zealand. The competition takes the form of a number of "regular season" matches between all teams, after which the top six contest a Finals Series in order to qualify for the Grand Final, to play for the title of A-League Women Champions. The Grand Final is almost exclusively contested at the home ground of the team ranked higher during the regular season. The first W-League Grand Final was won by Queensland Roar, who beat Canberra United 2–0.

Sydney FC have won a record five Grand Finals and have been runners-up more than any other team, having lost in the Grand Final six times. Melbourne City have won a record four Championships and are the only A-League Women team to have won 3 championships back-to-back. Sydney FC are the current Champions, having beaten Western United FC 4–0 in the 2023 Grand Final.

== History ==
The winners of the first tournament were Queensland Roar (who were later to change their name to "Brisbane Roar"), after finishing at the top of the table over the regular season ("Premiers"). The Roar made all but two of the first seven W-League grand finals. In the 14 A-League Women seasons to date (including the 13 played under the original W-League branding), the Premiers have only gone on to win the Grand Final four times. The 2015 Grand Final was the first to feature neither the Roar nor Sydney FC.

Sydney FC has made 7 Grand Finals in a row as of the 2024 decider, beginning with their 2–0 loss at home to Melbourne City in 2018.

Between 2012 and 2014, the W-League Champions were invited to play in the International Women's Club Championship.

== Finals ==
=== Key ===
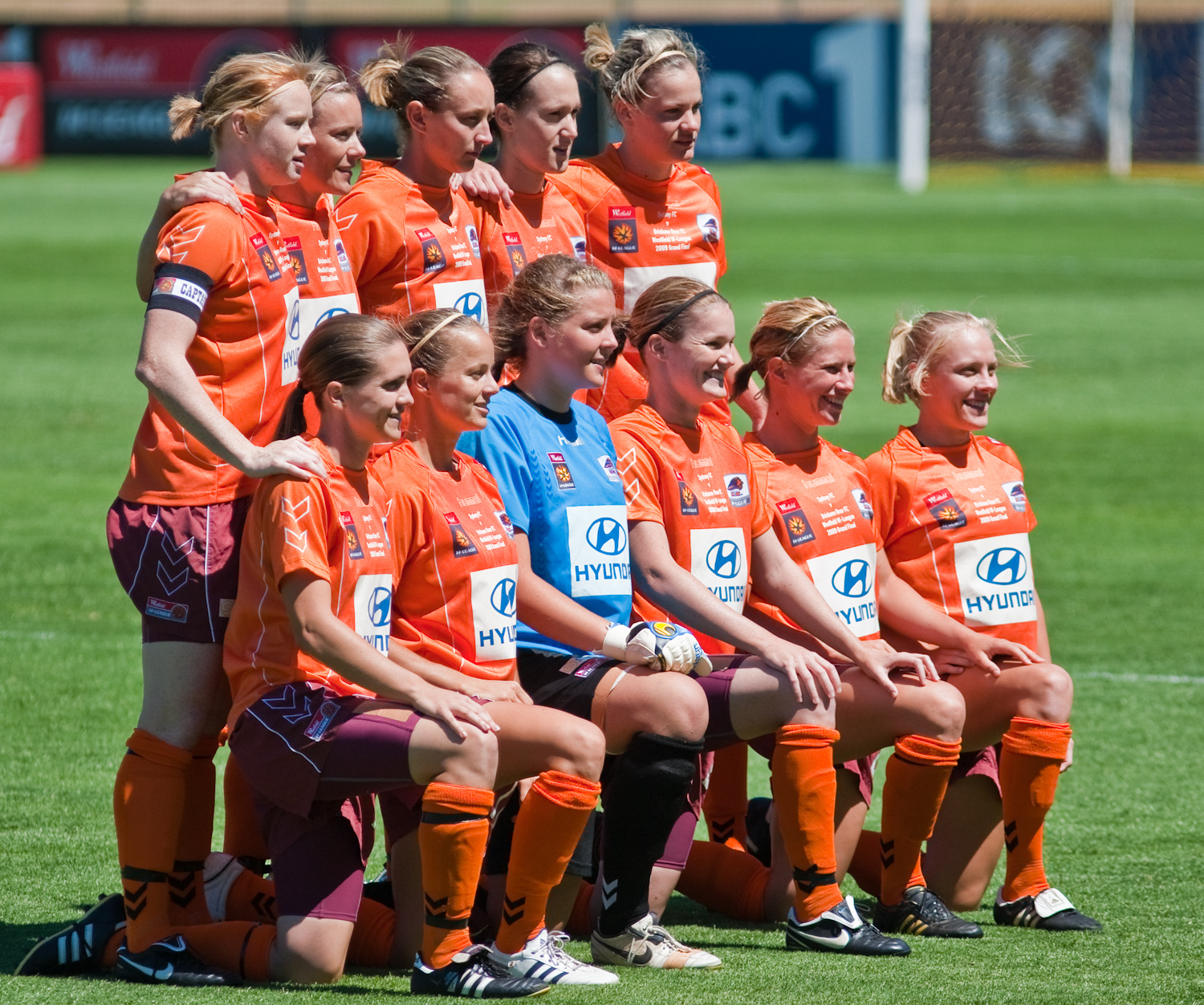
The Brisbane Roar team before the 2010 W-League Grand Final.

Key to the list of finals
†	Match was won during extra time
*	Match was won on a penalty shootout
‡	Winning team won the Double

=== Results ===
W-League/A-League Women Champions
Final	Winner	Score	Runner-up	Venue	Attendance^{[A]}
2009	Brisbane Roar FC ‡	2–0	Canberra United FC	Ballymore Stadium	4,554
2010	Sydney FC ‡	3–2	Brisbane Roar FC	Endeavour Field	1,439
2011	Brisbane Roar FC	2–1	Sydney FC	Campbelltown Stadium	1,872
2012	Canberra United FC ‡	3–2	Brisbane Roar FC	McKellar Park	2,512
2013	Sydney FC	3–1	Melbourne Victory FC	Melbourne Rectangular Stadium	4,181
2014	Melbourne Victory FC	2–0	Brisbane Roar FC	Lakeside Stadium	2,504
2015	Canberra United FC	3–1	Perth Glory FC	Perth Rectangular Stadium	2,671
2016	Melbourne City FC ‡	4–1	Sydney FC	Melbourne Rectangular Stadium	4,206
2017	Melbourne City FC	2–0	Perth Glory FC	Perth Rectangular Stadium	4,591
2018	Melbourne City FC	2–0	Sydney FC	Sydney Football Stadium	6,025
2019	Sydney FC	4–2	Perth Glory FC	Jubilee Stadium	6,127
2020	Melbourne City FC	1–0	Sydney FC	Melbourne Rectangular Stadium	0^{[B]}
2021	Melbourne Victory FC †	1–0	Sydney FC	Jubilee Stadium	4,619
2022	Melbourne Victory FC	2–1	Sydney FC	Jubilee Stadium	5,027
2023	Sydney FC ‡	4–0	Western United FC	Western Sydney Stadium	9,519
2024	Sydney FC	1–0	Melbourne City FC	Melbourne Rectangular Stadium	7,671
2025	Central Coast Mariners FC*	1–1 (5–4 p)	Melbourne Victory FC	Melbourne Rectangular Stadium	6,568
2026	Melbourne City FC ‡	3–1	Wellington Phoenix	Melbourne Rectangular Stadium	7,174

== Results by team ==
A-League Women Grand Final winners by team
Team	Winners	Runners-up	Years won	Years runner-up
Sydney FC	5	6	2010, 2013, 2019, 2023, 2024	2011, 2016, 2018, 2020, 2021, 2022
Melbourne City FC	5	1	2016, 2017, 2018, 2020, 2026	2024
Melbourne Victory FC	3	1	2014, 2021, 2022	2013
Brisbane Roar FC^{[C]}	2	3	2009, 2011,	2010, 2012, 2015
Canberra United FC	2	1	2012, 2015	2009
Central Coast Mariners FC	1	0	2025	
Perth Glory FC	0	3		2015, 2017, 2019
Western United FC	0	1		2023
Wellington Phoenix	0	1		2026

== See also ==
- List of Australian soccer champions
- A-League Men Grand Final
- AFL Women's Grand Final
- NRL Women's Grand Final
- WNBL Grand Final

== Notes ==
A. ^{a} Attendance refers to the number of people present during that year's final.
B. ^{a} 2020 Grand Final was played behind closed doors due to the COVID-19 pandemic.
C. ^{a} Brisbane Roar's total includes one win under the earlier name of Queensland Roar.
