= Victoria Esson =

New Zealand footballer (born 1991)

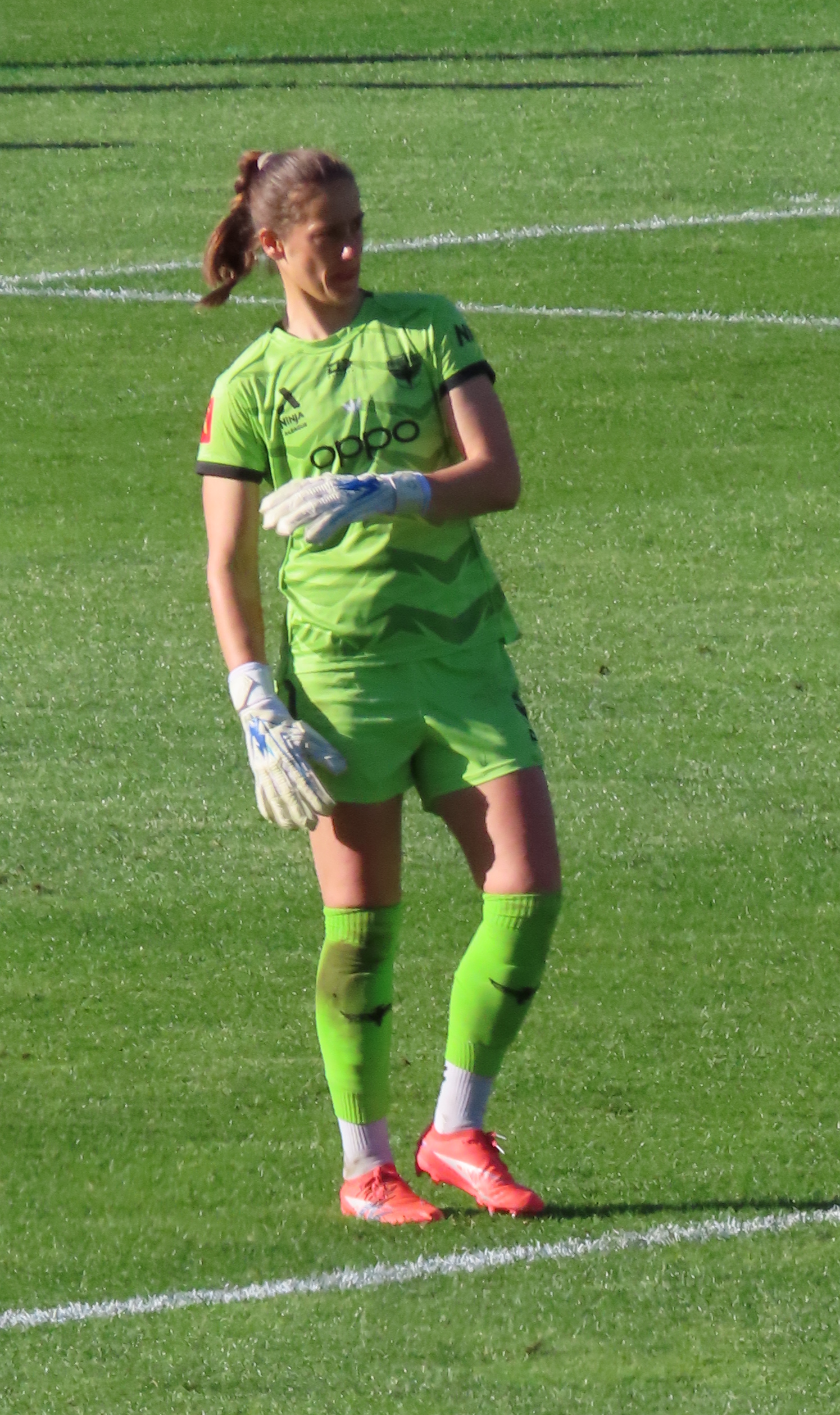
- Esson playing for the Wellington Phoenix in 2026.

Personal information
- Full name: Victoria Lucy Esson
- Date of birth: 6 March 1991 (age 35)
- Place of birth: Christchurch, New Zealand
- Height: 1.75 m (5 ft 9 in)
- Position: Goalkeeper

Team information
- Current team: Wellington Phoenix
- Number: 1

College career
Years	Team	Apps	(Gls)
2012–2013	Texas Tech Red Raiders	40	(0)

Senior career*
Years	Team	Apps	(Gls)
2014	Avaldsnes IL		
2014	Coastal Spirit FC		
2014	Mainland Pride	36	(0)
2017–2018	North Shore United (Seagulls)	46	(0)
2019–2022	Avaldsnes	4	(0)
2022	SC Sand	12	(0)
2022–2025	Rangers	44	(0)
2025–	Wellington Phoenix	22	(0)

International career^{‡}
2008	New Zealand U-17	3	(0)
2017–	New Zealand	33	(0)
- * Club domestic league appearances and goals as of 23 May 2026. ‡ National team caps and goals as of 23 May 2026.

Victoria Lucy Esson (born 6 March 1991) is a New Zealand professional footballer who plays as a goalkeeper for A-League Women club Wellington Phoenix and the New Zealand national team.

== Early life ==
Esson started playing football at the age of 10 for Halswell United. At first a midfielder and later defender, she became a goalkeeper at the age of 17. Playing for Burnside High School, Esson became the team captain and played at Secondary School tournaments, getting selected to be part of South Island Secondary Schoolgirls squad and the Mainland's U-14 and U-16 squads.

== Club career ==
Esson went to Texas Tech in 2011, becoming Tech's first-ever international football play in the school's history. Esson became Tech's all-time leader in career shut-outs, career goals against and set school records for single season and consecutive shut-outs. Esson also broke the Big 12 Conference record for single season shut-outs with 15 in 2013. Esson ended her time in goal at Tech, winning 41 of their 62 games, including six draws. After graduating, Esson signed with Avaldsnes IL. Struggling to adapt, she returned to New Zealand after just six weeks. She signed with Coastal Spirit FC, but missed most of the season with an injured hand.

In 2014, Esson was captain of Mainland Pride as they won the National Women's League, the top-flight women's football tournament of New Zealand. In 2019, Esson signed with Avaldsnes again, this time playing for three years.

In February 2022, following the injury of first goalkeeper Jasmin Pal, Esson was signed by SC Sand.

In July 2022, Esson joined Scottish club Rangers.

In June 2025, Esson returned to New Zealand and joined Wellington Phoenix. In June 2026, following a successful season as the starting goalkeeper for the Phoenix, including making it to the 2026 grand final, the Phoenix re-signed Esson on a further one-year contract for the 2026–27 season.

== International career ==
Esson was a member of the New Zealand U-17 side at the 2008 held in New Zealand, playing all three of three of New Zealand's group games. She was also part of the New Zealand U-20 teams for the 2008 and 2010 Women's World Cups but didn't make an appearance on the field.

Esson made her senior debut for the senior New Zealand team, the Football Ferns, against Thailand. Coming on as a sub in the 80th minute in their 5–0 win.

In April 2019, Esson was named to the final 23-player squad for the 2019 FIFA Women's World Cup.

On 25 June 2021, Esson was called up to the New Zealand squad for the delayed 2020 Summer Olympics.

Esson was called up to the New Zealand squad for the 2023 FIFA Women's World Cup. She was the starting goalie for New Zealand in all the games in the 2023 FIFA Women's World Cup.

On 4 July 2024, Esson was called up to the New Zealand squad for the 2024 Summer Olympics.

== Personal life ==
Esson completed her degree in wind, energy and industrial engineering while she was playing football at Texas Tech. Afterwards she got a job at the Canterbury Earthquake Recovery Authority.

== Honours ==
Individual

- Mainland Football Women's Goalkeeper of the Year: 2014
