= Lara Wall =

New Zealand footballer (born 2000)

- Wall playing for the Wellington Phoenix in 2026.

Personal information
- Full name: Lara Sahar Wall
- Date of birth: 31 May 2000 (age 26)
- Place of birth: Dunedin, New Zealand
- Position: Defender

Team information
- Current team: Wellington Phoenix
- Number: 3

Youth career
- Southern United

Senior career*
Years	Team	Apps	(Gls)
2019–2024	Canterbury United Pride		
2024	Cashmere Technical		
2024–	Wellington Phoenix	39	(1)

International career^{‡}
2025–	New Zealand	2	(0)
- * Club domestic league appearances and goals as of 16 October 2026 ‡ National team caps and goals as of 23 May 2026

Lara Sahar Wall (born 31 May 2000) is a New Zealand international footballer who plays as a defender for the Wellington Phoenix of the A-League Women. She is a structural engineer by profession.

== Personal life ==
Aside from playing football, Wall works as a structural engineer, a job which she kept concurrent to playing professionally for Wellington Phoenix. She graduated from the University of Canterbury with a bachelor of engineering in 2022. After university, she has worked for Holmes NZ in seismic assessment and strengthening, first based at their Christchurch office and then based in Wellington.

== Club career ==
=== Canterbury United Pride and Cashmere Technical ===
Wall played five seasons for Canterbury United Pride in the National Women's League, winning two titles in 2019 and 2020. In 2024, she played alongside Annalie Longo at Cashmere Technical and helped win three trophies for the club. She played as a wingback and scored seven goals as well as providing numerous assists.

=== Wellington Phoenix ===
Following a successful trial for the Wellington Phoenix, Wall signed her first professional contract in October 2024. Wall was a second half substitute in the opening three matches of the 2024–25 season before becoming the starting left-back. She was one of four players to feature in all 23 of the Phoenix's matches that season. On 4 January 2025, Wall assisted Olivia Fergusson in the Phoenix's 2–0 win against Perth Glory. Wall suffered a torn left calf in a match against the Central Coast Mariners on 15 February 2026, sidelining her for eight weeks.

In August 2026, Wall departed Wellington Phoenix at the conclusion of her contract. On 16 October 2026, the Phoenix confirmed Wall had been re-signed by the club for the 2026–27 season.

== International career ==
=== New Zealand ===
Wall received her initial call-up to the Football Ferns in October 2025 for matches against Mexico and the United States. She made her international debut on 30 October 2025 against the United States after being substituted at halftime replacing Indiah-Paige Riley.

== Honours ==
Canterbury United Pride

- New Zealand Women's National League: 2019, 2020.
