= Mackenzie Anthony =

American soccer player (born 2002)

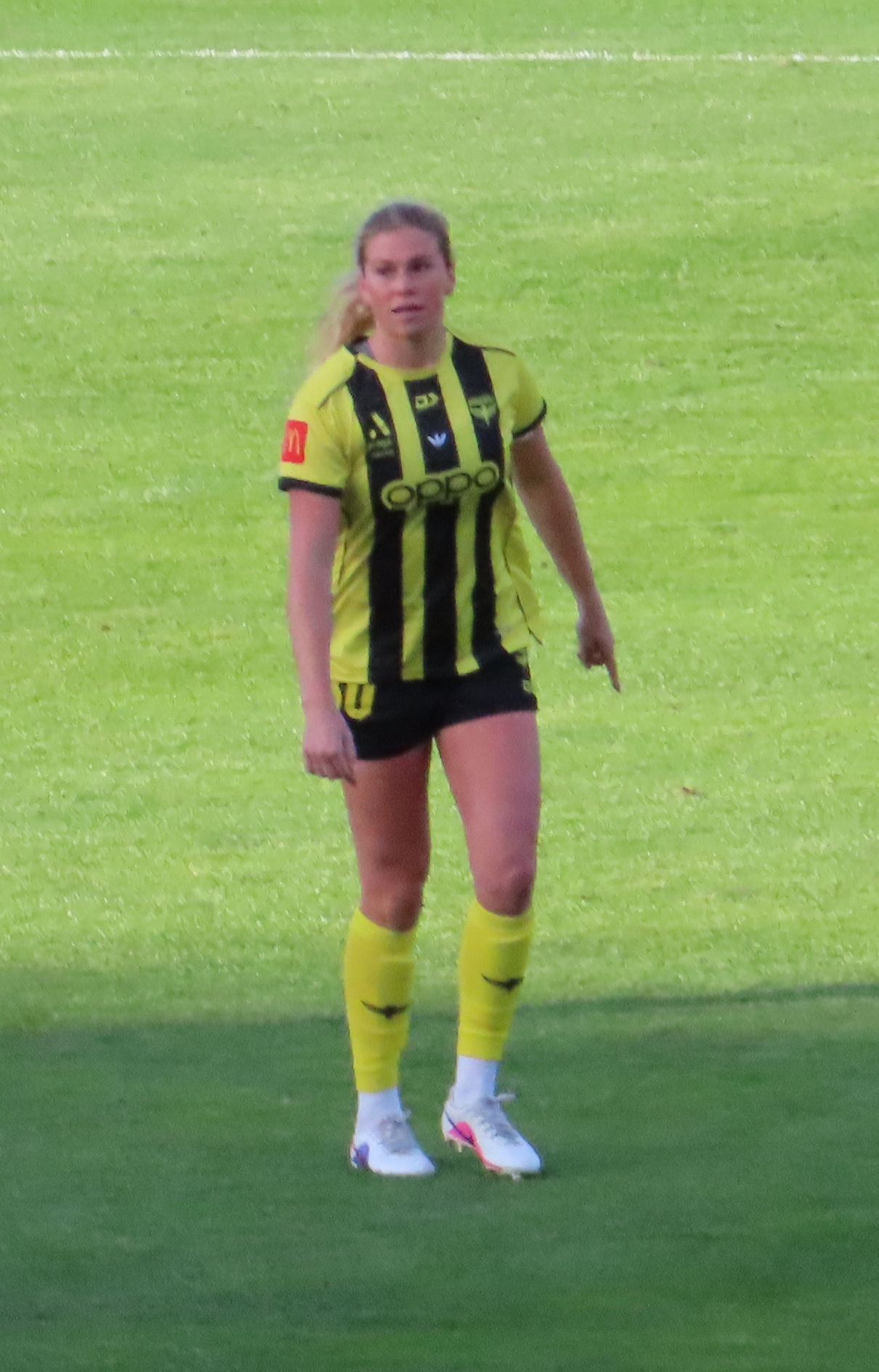
- Anthony playing for the Wellington Phoenix in 2026.

Personal information
- Full name: Mackenzie Brooke Anthony
- Date of birth: September 1, 2002 (age 24)
- Place of birth: Wheaton, Illinois, United States
- Height: 1.75 m (5 ft 9 in)
- Position: Forward

College career
| Years | Team | Apps | (Gls) |
| 2020–2021 | Baylor Bears | 32 | (10) |
| 2023–2024 | Michigan State Spartans | 36 | (9) |

Senior career*
| Years | Team | Apps | (Gls) |
| 2025 | Shelbourne FC | 20 | (16) |
| 2026 | Wellington Phoenix | 13 | (1) |
- * Club domestic league appearances and goals as of May 23, 2026

Mackenzie Brooke Anthony (born September 1, 2002) is an American professional soccer player who last played as a forward for the Wellington Phoenix of the A-League Women.

== Early life ==
Anthony was born on September 1, 2002, in the United States. A native of Wheaton, Illinois, United States, she started playing soccer at the age of five.

Growing up, she attended Baylor University in the United States. Following her stint there, she attended Michigan State University in the United States, where she studied advertising management.

== Career ==
=== Shelbourne ===
Ahead of the 2025 season, Anthony signed for Irish side Shelbourne FC, where she made twenty league appearances and scored sixteen goals.

=== Wellington Phoenix ===
In January 2026, she signed for New Zealand side Wellington Phoenix of the A-League Women. On February 15, Anthony scored her first goal for the Phoenix in a 2–1 defeat to the Central Coast Mariners at Porirua Park, Porirua.

In August 2026, Anthony departed Wellington Phoenix following the conclusion of her contract and the club not having visa spots available to retain her.
