= Lucía León =

Dominican footballer (born 1997)

Lucia León
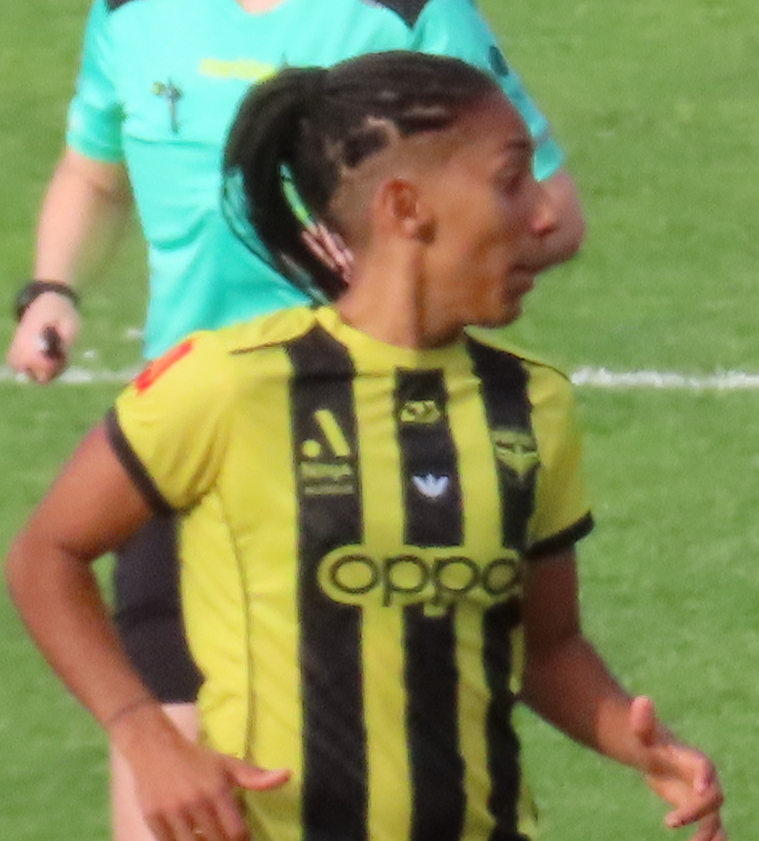
- León with Wellington Phoenix in 2026

Personal information
- Full name: Lucía Marte de León
- Date of birth: 14 August 1997 (age 29)
- Place of birth: Madrid, Spain
- Height: 1.70 m (5 ft 7 in)
- Position: Right back

Youth career
- Madrid CFF

Senior career*
Years	Team	Apps	(Gls)
2013–2021	Tottenham Hotspur	42	(4)
2021	→ Madrid CFF (loan)	15	(0)
2021–2023	Real Betis	41	(3)
2023–2024	Watford	20	(1)
2024–2025	Adelaide United	26	(5)
2025–2026	Wellington Phoenix	20	(0)

International career^{‡}
2019	Spain U23		
2021–	Dominican Republic	12	(3)
- * Club domestic league appearances and goals as of 23 May 2026 ‡ National team caps and goals as of 6 August 2022

Lucía Marte de León (Spanish: [luˈsi.a ˈmaɾ.te ðe leˈon]; (Note: In Dominican Spanish, Lucía is pronounced [luˈsi.a], though in Castilian Spanish (the dialect spoken in her country of birth, Spain), it is pronounced [luˈθia].) born 14 August 1997), known as Lucia León, is a professional footballer who last played as a right back for A-League Women club Wellington Phoenix. Born and raised in Spain to Dominican parents, she plays for the Dominican Republic women's national team.

León scored Tottenham Hotspur's first ever Women's Super League goal against Arsenal in the 2020 North London Derby.

== Club career ==
=== Tottenham Hotspur ===
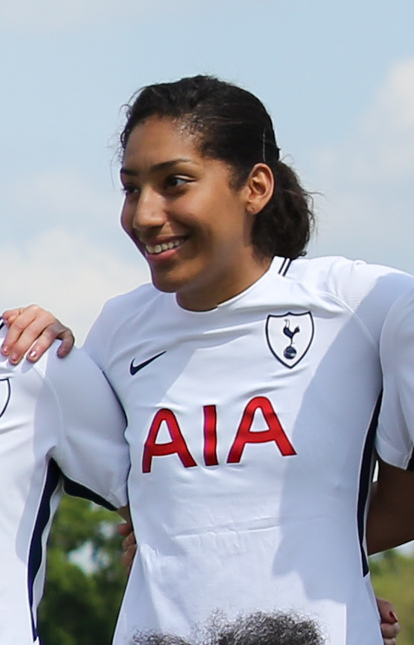
León with Tottenham Hotspur in 2018.

León joined Tottenham Hotspur in 2013 as a youth. During the 2018-19 FA Women's Championship, she played in 17 games, including six starts.

Speaking in 2020 during an interview regarding footballing culture, León revealed how far Tottenham Women had come as a club since she joined in 2013, expressing how much of a positive impact being able to train as a full-time professional club had made.

=== Adelaide United ===
In September 2024, León joined Australian A-League Women club Adelaide United. In June 2025, it was announced that she departed the club at the conclusion of her contract and is set to join another A-League Women club.

=== Wellington Phoenix ===
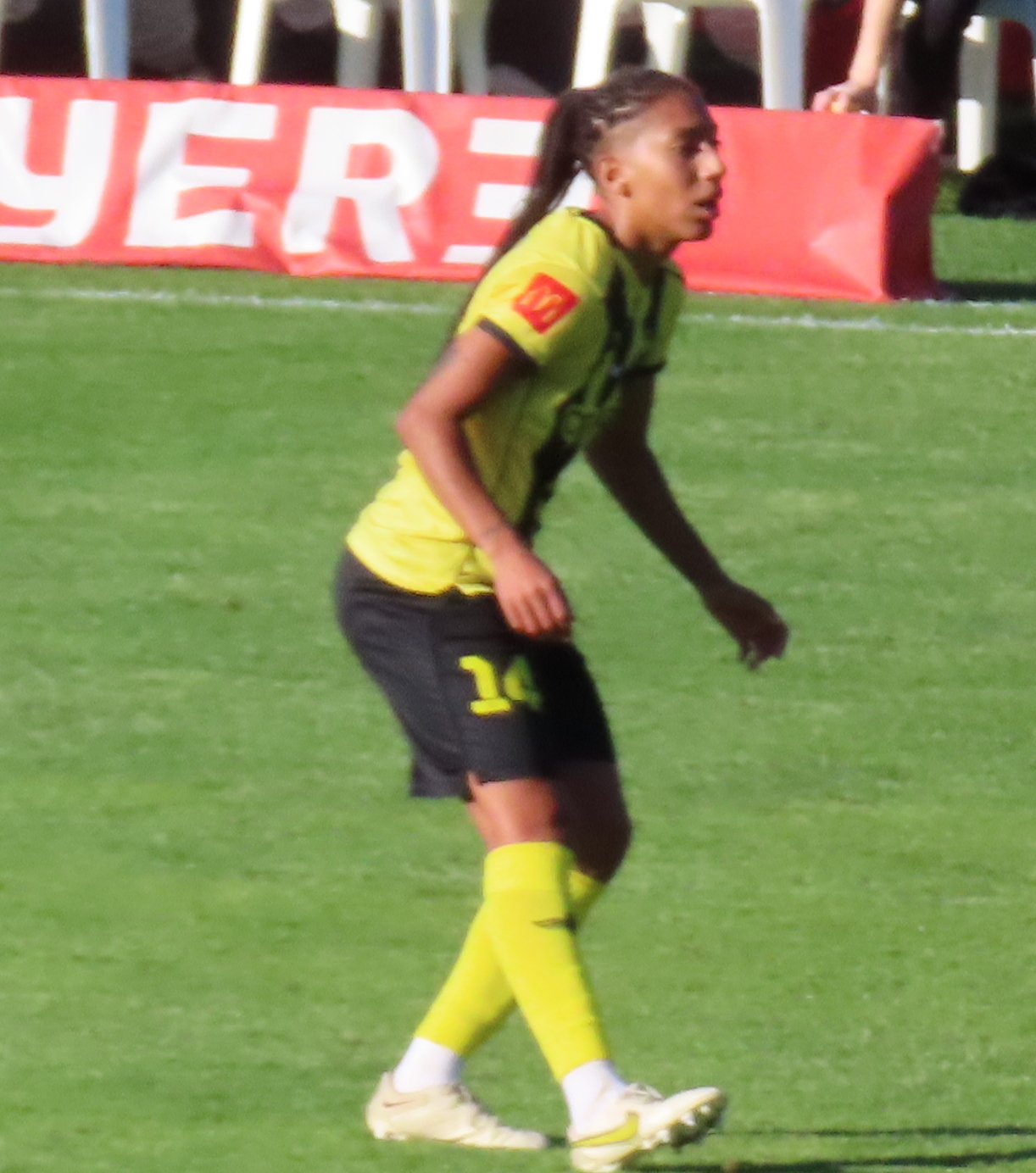
León playing for the Wellington Phoenix in 2026.

The day after announcing her departure from Adelaide United, it was announced that León had signed for Wellington Phoenix. In June 2026, the club announced León's departure at the conclusion of her contract, having made 20 appearances over the season.
