= Bev Priestman =

English football manager (born 1986)

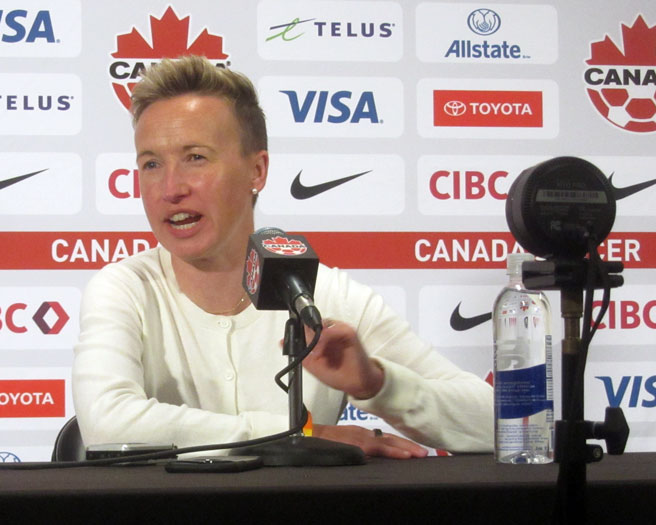
- Priestman in 2024

Personal information
- Full name: Beverly Priestman
- Date of birth: 29 April 1986 (age 40)
- Place of birth: Consett, England

Managerial career
- Years: Team
- 2013–2016: Canada U17
- 2017–2018: Canada U20
- 2018–2020: England (assistant)
- 2020–2024: Canada
- 2025–: Wellington Phoenix
Medal record
Women's soccer
Representing Canada (as manager)
Olympic Games
Gold medal – first place	2020 Tokyo	Team

Beverly Priestman (/ˈpɹiːstmən/ PREEST-mən; born 29 April 1986) is an English professional football manager who is the current head coach of the Wellington Phoenix women's team.

== Early life ==
At age 12, Priestman signed-up for futsal in Consett, under John Herdman, who was at the time a university lecturer and a part-time football coach. Priestman graduated from Liverpool John Moores University and worked for Everton under Mo Marley.

== Coaching career ==
=== Early career ===
Priestman has coached Canada's U-17 and U-20 women's squads and was a technical assistant for the Canada women's national soccer team under head coach Herdman until 2016. She coached England's women's U-17 squad, and she was assistant coach of the England women's national football team under head coach Phil Neville from 2018 to 2020.

=== Canada women ===
In October 2020, Priestman was appointed as the head coach of Canada women's national soccer team, leading them to the gold medal at the delayed 2020 Summer Olympics in Tokyo on 6 August 2021.

On 24 July 2024, she voluntarily withdrew from coaching the team for their opening match at the 2024 Summer Olympics in Paris against New Zealand after two members of her backroom staff were sent home for allegedly flying a drone over the opposition team's training session in the build-up to the game. Two days later, Priestman was removed as Olympic head coach and suspended by Canada Soccer which said it had instigated an "independent external review" while world football governing body, FIFA, also announced it has opened disciplinary proceedings against her and the staff involved. On 27 July, FIFA announced that Priestman would be suspended from football-related activities for one year due to "offensive behaviour and violation of the principles of fair play." In November, Canada Soccer announced that an external investigation concluded that Priestman and assistant coach Jasmine Mander ordered analyst Joseph Lombardi to fly a drone during a New Zealand training session closed to the public. The three of them were subsequently fired.

=== Wellington Phoenix ===
Priestman coaching the Wellington Phoenix in 2026

On 30 July 2025, the New Zealand team Wellington Phoenix announced Priestman as head coach, with her signing a two-season contract. In her introductory press conference with the Phoenix, she expressed excitement about returning to football following her year-long suspension, saying "It's been very difficult and I'm just excited to put my head down, work hard and get back to work and do what I love every day."

== Personal life ==
Priestman is married to Emma Humphries, a former midfielder with the New Zealand football team. Their son was born in 2018.

== Managerial statistics ==
As of "A" matches played 5 June 2024

Managerial record by team and tenure
Team	From	To	Record								Ref
Team	From	To	G	W	D	L	GF	GA	GD	Win %	Ref
Canada Women	28 October 2020	12 November 2024	56	30	15	11	87	39	+48	53.57	

== Honours ==
=== Canada Women ===
- Summer Olympics: 2020
- CONCACAF Women's Championship runner-up: 2022

Individual

- IFFHS Women's World Best National Coach: 2021
