= Emma Pijnenburg =

New Zealand footballer (born 2004)

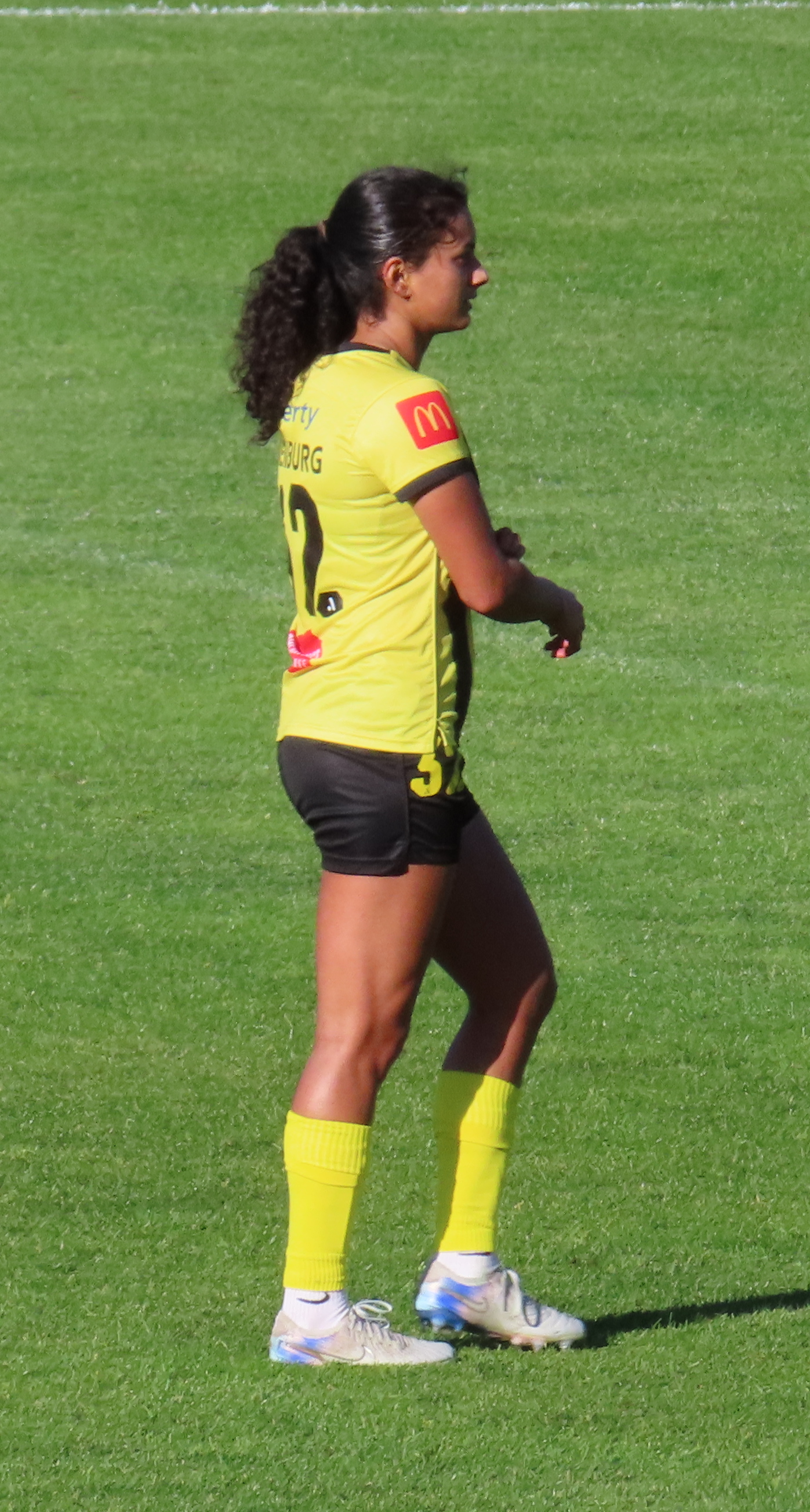
- Pijnenburg playing for Wellington Phoenix in 2026.

Personal information
- Full name: Emma Sheela Pijnenburg
- Date of birth: 13 September 2004 (age 22)
- Place of birth: Auckland, New Zealand
- Positions: Midfielder; full-back

Team information
- Current team: Hera United

Youth career
- –2023: Western Springs AFC

Senior career*
Years	Team	Apps	(Gls)
2023–2025	Feyenoord	30	(1)
2025–2026	Wellington Phoenix	17	(2)
2026–	Hera United	0	(0)

International career^{‡}
2022–2024	New Zealand U-20	3	(0)
2025–	New Zealand	11	(0)
- * Club domestic league appearances and goals as of 23 May 2026 ‡ National team caps and goals as of 23 May 2026

Emma Sheela Pijnenburg (born 13 September 2004) is a New Zealand professional footballer who plays as a midfielder or full-back for Eredivisie club Hera United and the New Zealand national team.

== Youth career ==
Pijnenburg played for local Auckland club Western Springs, starting from the age of six. As well as playing for Western Springs, in her youth Pijnenburg was also selected for the Auckland Football Federation women's team, and the Football Ferns training squad.

== Club career ==
=== Feyenoord ===
In the European winter break of 2023, Pijnenburg was signed by Dutch club Feyenoord. The midfielder was signed on a two year contract, and made her debut for the club on 17 February 2024.

=== Wellington Phoenix ===
On 29 December 2025, it was announced that Pijnenburg would be joining the Wellington Phoenix with immediate effect. She was signed on a contract that would see her stay with the club for the remainder of the 2025–26 A-League Women season. As she does for the Football Ferns, Pijnenburg wears the number 32 shirt. Pijnenburg was immediately added into the wider squad ahead of the Phoenix's next match against Western Sydney Wanderers on 30 December 2025. In that match, Pijnenburg made her debut for new club, coming on as a substitute for CJ Bott in the 53rd minute. The match ended in a 3–0 victory for the Phoenix.

On 1 February 2026, Pijnenburg scored her first goal for the Phoenix. She scored the third goal in a 5–1 victory over Newcastle Jets.

In June 2026, Pijnenburg departed the club at the conclusion of her contract to return to the Netherlands where she signed with Hera United.

== International career ==
Pijnenburg was selected for the New Zealand U-20 side in 2024 as part of the side that would play at the 2024 FIFA Women's U-20 Women's World Cup held in Colombia.

On 3 February 2025, Pijnenburg was selected in the Football Ferns squad for the first time in her career ahead of a two match series against Costa Rica. Pijnenburg made her debut in the second match of the series played on the 25th of February, coming on as a substitite for Grace Neville in the 80th minute. Pijnenburg wears the number 32 shirt for the Football Ferns.
