= Marisa van der Meer =

New Zealand footballer

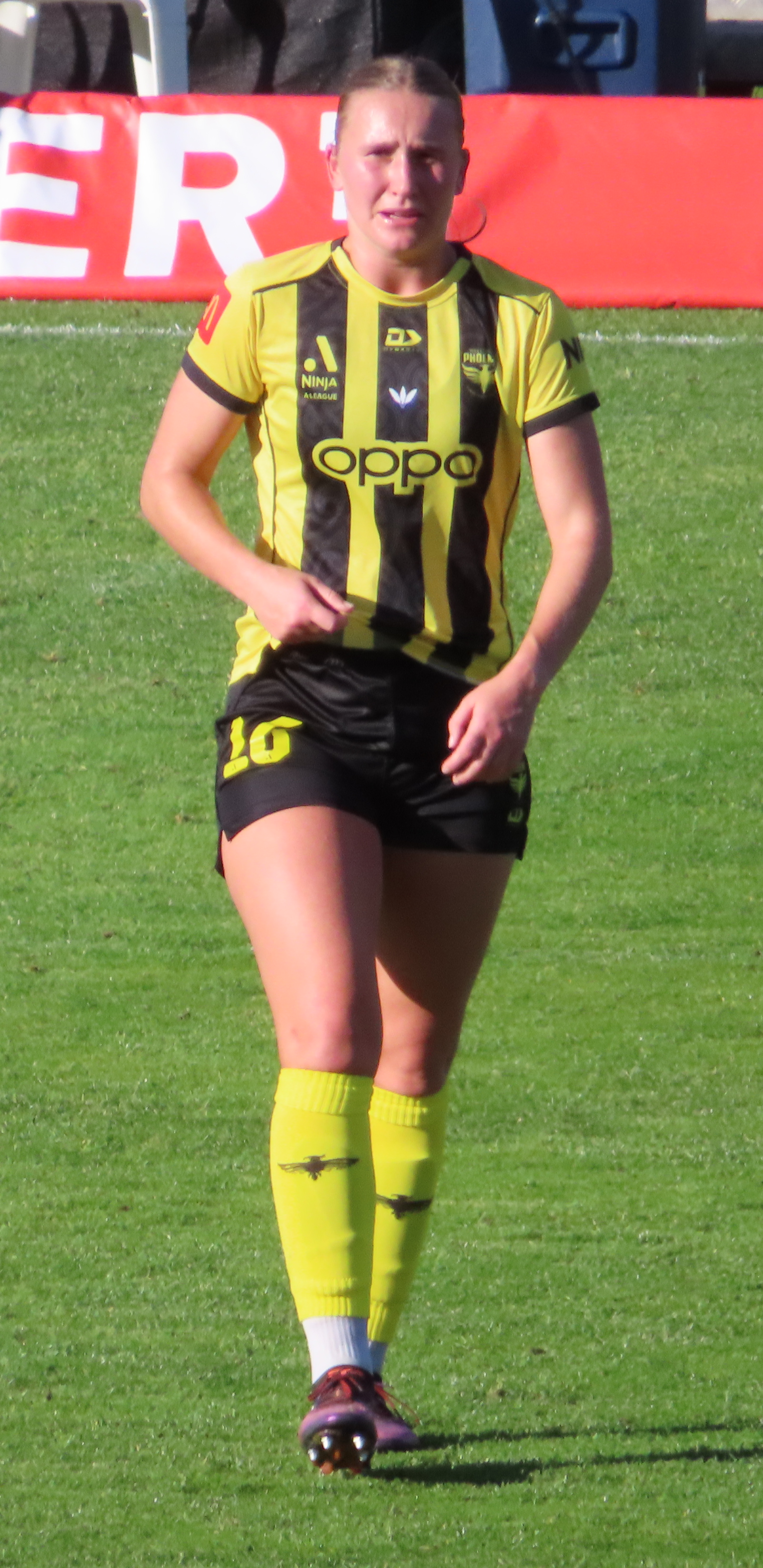
- Van der Meer playing for Wellington Phoenix in 2026.

Personal information
- Full name: Marisa Isabel van der Meer
- Date of birth: 27 March 2002 (age 24)
- Place of birth: New Zealand
- Height: 1.73 m (5 ft 8 in)
- Position: Defender

Team information
- Current team: Wellington Phoenix
- Number: 16

Senior career*
Years	Team	Apps	(Gls)
2021–2022	Melbourne City	10	(0)
2022–2024	Wellington Phoenix	23	(3)
2025–	Wellington Phoenix	23	(3)

International career^{‡}
2018	New Zealand U-17	6	(0)
2019–2022	New Zealand U-20	11	(0)
Medal record
FIFA U-17 Women's World Cup
Bronze medal – third place	2018 Uruguay	Tournament
- * Club domestic league appearances and goals as of 23 May 2026 ‡ National team caps and goals as of 16 August 2022

Marisa Isabel van der Meer (Dutch: [vɑn də mɪːr]; born 27 March 2002) is a New Zealand professional footballer who plays as a defender for Wellington Phoenix. She is part of the New Zealand Football team in the football competition at the 2020 Summer Olympics.

== Honours ==
Individual

- Mainland Football Women's Youth of the Year: 2019
