= List of Wellington Phoenix FC end-of-season awards =

The following list of awards are presented at the Annual Wellington Phoenix awards evening usually held at the conclusion of the regular home and away season.

== Men's awards ==
=== Player of the Year ===
The top award is voted for by coaches, chief executive and the football operations manager. After each game points would be awarded to the 3 top players and the player with the most accumulated points at the conclusion of the regular season is presented with the award.

Year	Player
2007–08	(New Zealand) Shane Smeltz
2008–09	(New Zealand) Leo Bertos
2009–10	(Australia) Andrew Durante
2010–11	(New Zealand) Ben Sigmund
2011–12	(New Zealand) Ben Sigmund
2012–13	(Australia) Andrew Durante
2013–14	(Spain) Albert Riera
2014–15	(Australia) Nathan Burns
2015–16	(New Zealand) Glen Moss
2016–17	(New Zealand) Kosta Barbarouses
2017–18	(Fiji) Roy Krishna
2018–19	(Fiji) Roy Krishna
2019–20	(England) David Ball
2020–21	(Mexico) Ulises Dávila
2021–22	(New Zealand) Oliver Sail
2022–23	(Poland) Oskar Zawada
2023–24	(New Zealand) Kosta Barbarouses
2024–25	(New Zealand) Kosta Barbarouses
2025–26	(New Zealand) Alex Rufer (Nigeria) Ifeanyi Eze

=== Players' Player of the Year ===
The Wellington Phoenix Players' Player of the Year award is presented to the player who is deemed to be the best player overall at the end of the season as judged by his teammates. Each player in the team votes three times over the season: after Round 7, Round 14 and Round 21.

Year	Player
2007–08	(New Zealand) Shane Smeltz
2008–09	(New Zealand) Shane Smeltz
2009–10	(Barbados) Paul Ifill
2010–11	(Malta) Manny Muscat
2011–12	(New Zealand) Ben Sigmund
2012–13	(New Zealand) Jeremy Brockie
2013–14	(Australia) Vince Lia
2014–15	(Australia) Nathan Burns
2015–16	(New Zealand) Glen Moss
2016–17	(Fiji) Roy Krishna
2017–18	(Australia) Dylan Fox
2018–19	(Fiji) Roy Krishna
2019–20	(New Zealand) Liberato Cacace
2020–21	(Mexico) Ulises Dávila
2021–22	(New Zealand) Oliver Sail
2022–23	(Poland) Oskar Zawada
2023–24	(New Zealand) Alex Paulsen
2024–25	(New Zealand) Kosta Barbarouses
2025–26	(New Zealand) Alex Rufer

=== Under-23 Player of the Year ===
The Wellington Phoenix Under-23 Player of the Year is voted upon by all season member ticket holders at the conclusion of the regular season. The Player with the most votes is awarded the trophy.

Year	Player
2009–10	(Australia) Troy Hearfield
2010–11	(New Zealand) Marco Rojas
2012–13	(New Zealand) Louis Fenton
2013–14	(New Zealand) Tyler Boyd
2014–15	(Curaçao) Roly Bonevacia
2015–16	(Australia) Dylan Fox
2016–17	(Australia) Jacob Tratt
2017–18	(New Zealand) Matthew Ridenton
2018–19	(New Zealand) Liberato Cacace
2019–20	(New Zealand) Liberato Cacace
2020–21	(New Zealand) Ben Waine
2021–22	(New Zealand) Sam Sutton
2022–23	(New Zealand) Callan Elliot
2023–24	(New Zealand) Alex Paulsen
2024–25	(New Zealand) Corban Piper
2025–26	(New Zealand) Isaac Hughes

=== Golden Boot ===
The Wellington Phoenix Golden Boot is awarded to the player who has scored the most goals during the regular season (Finals Series' goals are not included in this tally).

Year	Player	League goals
2007–08	(New Zealand) Shane Smeltz	10
2008–09	(New Zealand) Shane Smeltz	12
2009–10	(Barbados) Paul Ifill	12
2010–11	(England) Chris Greenacre	8
2011–12	(Barbados) Paul Ifill	7
2012–13	(New Zealand) Jeremy Brockie	16
2013–14	(Belgium) Stein Huysegems	10
2014–15	(Australia) Nathan Burns	13
2015–16	(Australia) Blake Powell	8
2016–17	(Fiji) Roy Krishna	12
2017–18	(Serbia) Andrija Kaludjerovic	9
2018–19	(Fiji) Roy Krishna	18
2019–20	(Mexico) Ulises Dávila	12
2020–21	(Israel) Tomer Hemed	11
2021–22	(Mexico) Gael Sandoval (Australia) Jaushua Sotirio (New Zealand) Ben Waine	6
2022–23	(Poland) Oskar Zawada	15
2023–24	(New Zealand) Kosta Barbarouses	13
2024–25	(New Zealand) Kosta Barbarouses	10
2025–26	(Nigeria) Ifeanyi Eze	10

=== Goal of the Year ===
Year	Player	Against
2011–12	(New Zealand) Tim Brown	Sydney FC on 27 November 2011
2012–13	not awarded	
2013–14	(Costa Rica) Kenny Cunningham	Melbourne Victory on 18 January 2014
2014–15	(Fiji) Roy Krishna	Newcastle Jets on 6 December 2014
2015–16	(Curaçao) Roly Bonevacia	Melbourne City on 25 January 2016
2016–17	(Australia) Vince Lia	Central Coast Mariners on 10 December 2016
2017–18	(Fiji) Roy Krishna	Brisbane Roar on 28 October 2017
2018–19	(Australia) David Williams	Newcastle Jets on 30 March 2019
2019–20	(Mexico) Ulises Dávila	Sydney FC on 21 December 2020
2020–21	(Australia) Cameron Devlin	Western Sydney Wanderers on 15 March 2021
2022–23	(New Zealand) Clayton Lewis	Macarthur FC on 6 November 2022
2023–24	(New Zealand) Ben Old	Adelaide United on 3 March 2024
2024–25	(New Zealand) Kosta Barbarouses	Newcastle Jets on 28 December 2024
2025–26	(New Zealand) Alex Rufer	Auckland FC on 6 December 2025

=== Members' Player of the Year ===
The Wellington Phoenix Members' Player of the Year award was voted upon by all season member ticket holders at the conclusion of the regular season. The Player with most votes was awarded the trophy.

Year	Player
2007–08	(New Zealand) Shane Smeltz
2008–09	(New Zealand) Ben Sigmund
2009–10	(Barbados) Paul Ifill
2010–11	(Malta) Manny Muscat
2011–12	(New Zealand) Ben Sigmund
2012–13	not awarded
2013–14	not awarded
2014–15	not awarded
2015–16	not awarded
2016–17	not awarded
2017–18	not awarded
2018–19	not awarded
2019–20	(New Zealand) Liberato Cacace
2020–21	(New Zealand) Oli Sail
2021–22	(England) David Ball
2022–23	(Poland) Oskar Zawada
2023–24	(New Zealand) Alex Paulsen
2024–25	(New Zealand) Kosta Barbarouses
2025–26	(Nigeria) Ifeanyi Eze

=== Media Player of the Year ===
Year	Player
2007–08	(New Zealand) Shane Smeltz
2008–09	(New Zealand) Shane Smeltz
2009–10	(Barbados) Paul Ifill
2010–11	(New Zealand) Marco Rojas
2011–12	(New Zealand) Ben Sigmund
2012–13	not awarded
2013–14	not awarded
2014–15	not awarded
2015–16	not awarded
2016–17	not awarded
2017–18	not awarded
2018–19	not awarded
2019–20	(New Zealand) Liberato Cacace
2020–21	(Mexico) Ulises Dávila
2021–22	(New Zealand) Oliver Sail
2022–23	(Poland) Oskar Zawada
2023–24	(New Zealand) Kosta Barbarouses
2024–25	(New Zealand) Kosta Barbarouses
2025–26	(Nigeria) Ifeanyi Eze

== Women's awards ==
Wellington Phoenix first entered a women's team into the A-League Women for the 2021–22 season.

=== Player of the Year ===
Year	Player
2021–22	(New Zealand) Kate Taylor
2022–23	(New Zealand) Michaela Foster
2023–24	(New Zealand) Mackenzie Barry
2024–25	(New Zealand) Annalie Longo
2025–26	(New Zealand) Grace Jale

=== Players' Player of the Year ===
Year	Player
2021–22	(New Zealand) Lily Alfeld
2022–23	(New Zealand) Michaela Foster
2023–24	(New Zealand) Mackenzie Barry
2024–25	(New Zealand) Annalie Longo
2025–26	(New Zealand) Grace Jale

=== Under-23 Player of the Year ===
Year	Player
2021–22	(New Zealand) Alyssa Whinham
2022–23	(New Zealand) Milly Clegg
2023–24	(New Zealand) Macey Fraser
2024–25	(New Zealand) Manaia Elliott
2025–26	(New Zealand) Pia Vlok

=== Golden Boot ===
The Wellington Phoenix Golden Boot is awarded to the player who has scored the most goals during the regular season (Finals Series' goals are not included in this tally).

Year	Player	League goals
2021–22	(New Zealand) Grace Jale	6
2022–23	(New Zealand) Milly Clegg	4
2023–24	(Venezuela) Mariana Speckmaier	10
2024–25	(England) Olivia Fergusson	5
2025–26	(England) Brooke Nunn (New Zealand) Pia Vlok	6

=== Goal of the Year ===
Year	Player	Against
2022–23	(New Zealand) Michaela Foster	Brisbane Roar on 29 January 2023
2023–24	(New Zealand) Macey Fraser	Western United on 12 November 2023
2024–25	(New Zealand) Alyssa Whinham	Western Sydney Wanderers on 9 January 2025
2025–26	(New Zealand) Macey Fraser	Central Coast Mariners on 25 March 2026

=== Members' Player of the Year ===
Year	Player
2021–22	(New Zealand) Kate Taylor
2022–23	(New Zealand) Michaela Foster
2023–24	(New Zealand) Macey Fraser
2024–25	(New Zealand) Annalie Longo
2025–26	(England) Brooke Nunn

=== Media Player of the Year ===
Year	Player
2021–22	(New Zealand) Kate Taylor
2022–23	(New Zealand) Michaela Foster
2023–24	(Venezuela) Mariana Speckmaier
2024–25	(New Zealand) Annalie Longo
2025–26	(England) Brooke Nunn

== Lloyd Morrison Spirit of the Phoenix award ==
Year	Winner
2011–12	Russell Gray
2012–13	Ben Sigmund
2013–14	Leo Bertos and Stein Huysegems
2014–15	Lee Spence and Rob Lee
2015–16	Ben Sigmund
2016–17	Shaun Gill
2017–18	Chris Greenacre
2018–19	Alex Rufer
2019–20	Wellington Phoenix
2022–23	Lily Alfeld
2023–24	David Dome
2024–25	Annalie Longo
2025–26	Mackenzie Barry

== Bandage Award ==
Selected by ex-Phoenix player, Ben Sigmund and awarded to the player who has shown the most fight, resilience and determination throughout the season.

Year	Winner
2018–19	Alex Rufer

== Staff Member of the Year ==
Year	Winner
2018–19	Tom Bray
2019–20	Aidan Wivell
2020–21	David Dome
2022–23	Jesse Rawlings and Kya Stewart
2023–24	Brenton Vannisselroy
2024–25	Jessica Fuller, Luke Tongue, Tom Shaw & Toni West-Luamanu
2025–26	Sam Wilkins & Georgia Jury-Putter

== Volunteer of the Year ==
Year	Winner
2011–12	David Graham
2012–13	Tracey Fleet
2013–14	not awarded
2014–15	not awarded
2015–16	not awarded
2016–17	Ken Allen
2017–18	Helen Mallon
2018–19	Gus and Esther Hutton
2019–20	Reece Lewis
2020–21	Bobby Mazevski
2022–23	Justin Raffan and Stu and Kirsty Jones
2023–24	Christoph Zintl & Jo Todd
2024–25	Ben Irving, Matt Gibson & Samir Shemon
2025–26	Steven Janes & Paul Ashworth

== Fan of the Year ==
Year	Winner
2011–12	Dale Warburton
2012–13	Ahmad Rini
2013–14	Bruce Lewis
2014–15	Niki O'Connor
2015–16	Carey McDonald
2016–17	Stephanie Evett
2017–18	Matt Weldon-Smith
2018–19	Steve Lyne
2019–20	Jess Pritchard
2020–21	Dean Bartle
2022–23	Peter Xu
2023–24	Holly Eades
2024–25	The Foster Crescent Crew
2025–26	Glen Williams

== Awards summary ==
- 2007–08 Awards
- 2008–09 Awards
- 2009–10 Awards
- 2010–11 Awards
- 2011–12 Awards
- 2014–15 Awards
- 2015–16 Awards
- 2016–17 Awards
- 2017–18 Awards
- 2018–19 Awards
- 2019–20 Awards (See references below)
