= 2017 National Premier Leagues Grand Final =

- Event: 2017 National Premier Leagues
Brisbane Strikers	Heidelberg United
0	2
- Date: 30 September 2017
- Venue: Perry Park, Brisbane
- Referee: Adrian Arndt
- Attendance: 1,105
- Weather: 24 °C (75 °F)

The 2017 National Premier Leagues Grand Final was the fifth National Premier Leagues Grand Final.This soccer match was played on 30 September 2017 at Perry Park in Brisbane, Queensland, Australia between Brisbane Strikers and Heidelberg United. Heidelberg won 2–0 to secure their inaugural National Premier Leagues title.

== Route to the final ==
Quarter-finals
(Australian Capital Territory) Canberra Olympic	1
(New South Wales) Edgeworth Eagles	4
(Tasmania) South Hobart	2
(Queensland) Brisbane Strikers	4
(Western Australia) Bayswater City	1
(Victoria (state)) Heidelberg United (a.e.t.)	3
(South Australia) Adelaide City	0
(New South Wales) APIA Leichhardt Tigers	1

Semi-finals
(New South Wales) Edgeworth Eagles	0
(Queensland) Brisbane Strikers	2
(Victoria (state)) Heidelberg United	2
(New South Wales) APIA Leichhardt Tigers	1

Grand Final
(Queensland) Brisbane Strikers	0
(Victoria (state)) Heidelberg United	2

== Match ==
30 September
18:00 AEST

Brisbane Strikers (Queensland)	0–2	(Victoria (state)) Heidelberg United
	Report	Zahra 41'; Ellis 61'

Perry Park, Brisbane
Attendance: 1,105
Referee: Adrian Arndt

GK	1	(Australia) Zac Speedy
RB	13	(Australia) Sam Knight
CB	5	(Scotland) Greig Henslee	(yellow card) 74'
CB	4	(Australia) Jake Marshall
LB	17	(Japan) Hiroki Omori
RM	10	(England) Jake McLean
CM	8	(Australia) Michael Angus
CM	6	(Australia) Ethan Docherty
LM	7	(Australia) Michael Lee
CF	11	(Australia) Jeremy Stewart	(substituted off) 77'
CF	18	(Australia) Ryan Palmer	(substituted off) 69'
Substitutes
GK	20	(Australia) Mitchell Thorn
MF	2	(Australia) Fraser Eller
MF	3	(Australia) Braedon Steele	(substituted on) 69'
MF	14	(Australia) Joel Anich
FW	19	(Australia) Luke Marsh	(substituted on) 77'
Manager: (Australia) Owen Baker

GK	1	(Australia) Christophe Theodoridis-Petropoulos
RB	2	(Australia) Joshua Wilkins	(yellow card) 90'
CB	4	(Australia) Jordan Wilkes
CB	13	(England) Luke Byles
LB	7	(Australia) Reuben Way	(yellow card) 19'
CM	40	(Australia) Alex Schiavo
CM	10	(Australia) Jack Petrie
CM	6	(Australia) Lewis Hall	(yellow card) 85'
RW	19	(Scotland) Sean Ellis	61'
CF	12	(South Sudan) Kenny Athiu
LW	9	(Australia) Adrian Zahra	42'
Substitutes
GK	23	(Australia) Christian Pavlidis
DF	3	(Australia) Leslie Doumbalis
DF	17	(Australia) Steven Pace	(substituted on) 62'
FW	8	(Australia) Andrew Cartanos	(substituted on) 62', (yellow card) 90+2'
FW	21	(Australia) Michael Trigger	(substituted on) 71'
Manager: (Australia) George Katsakis

Assistant referees:
(Australia) Joseph Lee
(Australia) James Sherry
Fourth official:
(Australia) Lara Lee

Match rules

- 90 minutes.
- 30 minutes of extra time if necessary.
- Penalty shoot-out if scores still level.
- Five named substitutes.
- Maximum of three substitutions.

=== Statistics ===
Overall statistics
	Brisbane Strikers	Heidelberg United
Goals scored	0	2
Total shots	8	15
Shots on target	2	7
Ball possession	55.6%	44.4%
Corner kicks	2	4
Fouls conceded	17	18
Offsides	0	3
Yellow cards	1	4
Red cards	0	0
