= 2022–23 Wellington Phoenix FC (women) season =

Wellington Phoenix
2022–23 season
- Manager: Natalie Lawrence
- Stadium: Sky Stadium
- A-League Women: 11th
- Top goalscorer: Milly Clegg (4 goals)
- Highest home attendance: 5,213 (vs. Melbourne City, 20 November 2022) (Note: A new Women's A-League record for a standalone regular season game.)
- Lowest home attendance: 850 (vs. Perth Glory, 18 March 2023)
- Average home league attendance: 2,485
- Biggest win: 5–0 (vs. Canberra United (H), 22 January 2023)
- Biggest defeat: 1–4 (vs. Melbourne City (H), 20 November 2022) (vs. Western United (H), 26 November 2022); 0–3 (vs. Canberra United (A), 10 December 2022)
- All statistics correct as of 19 March 2023.

The 2022–23 Wellington Phoenix season was the club's second season in the A-League Women, the premier competition for women's football in Australia, originally known as the W-League.

On 25 May, Wellington Phoenix announced that head coach Gemma Lewis had signed a one-year contract extension with the club. However, four months later Lewis departed to take up a job in her homeland with the Football Association of Wales, and assistant coach Natalie Lawrence replaced her as head coach.

== Players ==
=== First-team squad ===
As of 4 November 2022

Note: Flags indicate national team as defined under FIFA eligibility rules; some limited exceptions apply. Players may hold more than one non-FIFA nationality.

No.	Pos.	Nation	Player
1	GK	NZL	Lily Alfeld (captain)
2	DF	NZL	Saskia Vosper
3	DF	NZL	Kate Taylor (vice-captain)
4	DF	NZL	Mackenzie Barry
5	DF	NZL	Marisa van der Meer
6	MF	AUS	Isabel Gomez
7	MF	NZL	Chloe Knott
8	FW	NZL	Grace Wisnewski
9	FW	NZL	Ava Pritchard
10	MF	NZL	Alyssa Whinham
11	MF	NZL	Betsy Hassett
12	GK	NZL	Brianna Edwards

No.	Pos.	Nation	Player
13	FW	NZL	Paige Satchell
14	MF	NZL	Michaela Robertson
15	DF	NZL	Zoe McMeeken
16	FW	NZL	Emma Rolston
17	DF	AUS	Clauda Cicco
18	MF	NZL	Te Reremoana Walker (scholarship)
19	DF	NZL	Charlotte Lancaster (scholarship)
20	FW	NZL	Milly Clegg (amateur)
21	DF	NZL	Michaela Foster (scholarship)
22	GK	NZL	Georgia Candy (scholarship)

=== Transfers in ===
No.	Position	Player	Transferred from	Type/fee	Contract length	Date	Ref
13	FW	Paige Satchell	Sydney FC	Free transfer	1 year	20 July 2022	
11	MF	Betsy Hassett	(Iceland) Stjarnan	Free transfer	1 year	25 July 2022	
5	DF	Marisa van der Meer	Melbourne City	Free transfer	1 year	7 September 2022	
17	DF	(Australia) Clauda Cicco	(Australia) APIA Leichhardt	Free transfer	1 year	5 October 2022	
21	DF	Michaela Foster	(New Zealand) Northern Rovers	Free transfer	1 year (scholarship)	21 October 2022	
20	FW	Milly Clegg	(New Zealand) Auckland United	Free transfer	1 year (amateur)	4 November 2022	

==== From academy squad ====
N	Pos.	Nat.	Name	Age	Notes
14	MF	(New Zealand)	Michaela Robertson	26	
22	GK	(New Zealand)	Georgia Candy	21	scholarship contract

=== Transfers out ===
No.	Position	Player	Transferred to	Type/fee	Date	Ref.
10	MF	Grace Jale	Canberra United	End of contract	15 July 2022	
17	DF	(Australia) Talitha Kramer	Brisbane Roar	End of contract	31 August 2022	
14	DF	(Australia) Cushla Rue	Western Sydney Wanderers	End of contract	26 October 2022	
5	FW	(Australia) Jordan Jasnos	Unattached	End of contract	19 November 2022	
11	FW	Kelli Brown	Unattached	End of contract	19 November 2022	
16	MF	(Australia) Hannah Jones	Unattached	End of contract	19 November 2022	
18	DF	(Australia) Annabel Martin	Unattached	End of contract	19 November 2022	

=== Contract extensions ===
No.	Name	Position	Duration	Date	Ref.
4	Mackenzie Barry	DF	1 year	13 July 2022	
10	Alyssa Whinham	MF	2 years	18 July 2022	
1	Lily Alfeld	GK	1 year	21 July 2022	
3	Kate Taylor	DF	1 year	26 July 2022	
12	Brianna Edwards	GK	1 year	27 July 2022	
7	Chloe Knott	MF	2 years	29 July 2022	
6	(Australia) Isabel Gomez	MF	1 year	4 August 2022	
8	Grace Wisnewski	FW	1 year	2 September 2022	
15	Zoe McMeeken	DF	1 year	6 September 2022	
9	Ava Pritchard	FW	1 year	8 September 2022	
2	Saskia Vosper	DF	1 year	16 September 2022	
18	Te Reremoana Walker	MF	1 year (scholarship)	21 October 2022	
19	Charlotte Lancaster	DF	1 year (scholarship)	21 October 2022	

== A-League ==
=== League table ===
Pos	Team	Pld	W	D	L	GF	GA	GD	Pts
7	Western Sydney Wanderers	18	5	4	9	16	23	−7	19
8	Adelaide United	18	5	3	10	16	29	−13	18
9	Brisbane Roar (Note: The APL awarded Western United a 3–0 win as a result of Brisbane Roar fielding an ineligible player, after the round 17 match had originally finished 2–0 for Brisbane.)	18	4	6	8	16	31	−15	18
10	Newcastle Jets	18	4	2	12	22	53	−31	14
11	Wellington Phoenix	18	3	4	11	20	30	−10	13

Source: A-Leagues
Rules for classification: 1) points; 2) goal difference; 3) number of goals scored.

=== Matches ===
Win Draw Loss

- All times are in NZST

20 November 2022 1	Wellington Phoenix	1–4	Melbourne City	Wellington
15:00	Torpey 82' (o.g.)	Report	Henry 48'; Rojas 50'; Pollicina 65' (pen.), 69'	Stadium: Sky Stadium; Attendance: 5,213; Referee: Anna-Marie Keighley

26 November 2022 2	Wellington Phoenix	1–4	Western United	Wellington
15:00	van der Meer 23'	Report	McDonald 16'; Cummings 71'; Keane 77', 82'	Stadium: Sky Stadium; Attendance: 1,541; Referee: Bec Mackie

4 December 2022 3	Melbourne Victory	1–0	Wellington Phoenix	Melbourne
18:00	Ayres 50'	Report		Stadium: Epping Stadium; Attendance: 589; Referee: Kate Jacewicz

10 December 2022 4	Canberra United	3–0	Wellington Phoenix	Canberra
17:00	Maher 9'; Heyman 27', 53'	Report		Stadium: McKellar Park; Attendance: 1,430; Referee: Isabella Libri

17 December 2022 5	Wellington Phoenix	0–1	Adelaide United	Wellington
17:35		Report	Barry 22' (o.g.)	Stadium: Sky Stadium; Attendance: 4,535; Referee: Isabella Blaess

2 January 2023 8	Wellington Phoenix	1–1	Western Sydney Wanderers	Wellington
12:25	Robertson 41'	Report	Gallagher 60'	Stadium: Sky Stadium; Attendance: 1,943; Referee: Anna-Marie Keighley

7 January 2023 9	Western United	1–0	Wellington Phoenix	Melbourne
17:00	Vlajnic 78'	Report		Stadium: City Vista Recreation Reserve; Attendance: 630; Referee: Rebecca Durcau

15 January 2023 10	Perth Glory	2–0	Wellington Phoenix	Perth
21:00	Hintzen 6'; Phonsongkham 14' (pen.)	Report		Stadium: Macedonia Park; Attendance: 700; Referee: Casey Reibelt

22 January 2023 11	Wellington Phoenix	5–0	Canberra United	Wellington
12:25	Clegg 43'; Hassett 45', 83'; Pritchard 46'; Ilijoski 88' (o.g.)	Report		Stadium: Sky Stadium; Attendance: 2,044; Referee: Anna-Marie Keighley

29 January 2023 12	Brisbane Roar	3–3	Wellington Phoenix	Brisbane
16:00	Connors 14'; Gorry 28'; Crummer 86'	Report	Foster 33'; Clegg 66'; Wisnewski 78'	Stadium: Perry Park; Attendance: 753; Referee: Kelly Jones

12 February 2023 14	Western Sydney Wanderers	1–0	Wellington Phoenix	Sydney
17:00	Harding 40'	Report		Stadium: Wanderers Football Park; Attendance: 313; Referee: Bec Mackie

25 February 2023 15	Wellington Phoenix	0–1	Sydney FC	Auckland
17:00		Report	Lowe 47'	Stadium: North Harbour Stadium; Attendance: 1,182; Referee: Rachael Mitchenson

4 March 2023 16	Wellington Phoenix	1–1	Brisbane Roar	Wellington
15:40	van der Meer 26'	Report	Connors 80'	Stadium: Sky Stadium; Attendance: 2,574; Referee: Anna-Marie Keighley

11 March 2023 17	Sydney FC	0–1	Wellington Phoenix	Sydney
17:00		Report	Taylor 32'	Stadium: Netstrata Jubilee Stadium; Attendance: 518; Referee: Caitlin Williams

18 March 2023 18	Wellington Phoenix	0–1	Perth Glory	Wellington
17:00		Report	Hintzen 10'	Stadium: Sky Stadium; Attendance: 850; Referee: Isabella Libri

25 March 2023 19	Newcastle Jets	3–2	Wellington Phoenix	Newcastle
17:00	L. Allan 38'; Brodigan 64'; Davis 82'	Report	van der Meer 26'; Satchell 26'	Stadium: Newcastle Number 2 Sports Ground; Attendance: 606; Referee: Rebecca Durcau

28 March 2023 7	Adelaide United	1–3	Wellington Phoenix	Adelaide
19:00	Worts 21'	Report	Knott 19'; Clegg 75', 90+6'	Stadium: ServiceFM Stadium; Attendance: 694; Referee: Isabella Blaess

1 April 2023 20	Wellington Phoenix	2–2	Melbourne Victory	Wellington
12:25	Pritchard 75'; Wisnewski 90+9'	Report	Murphy 4'; Ayres 26'	Stadium: Sky Stadium; Referee: Georgia Ghirardello

=== Results summary ===
Overall								Home						Away					
Pld	W	D	L	GF	GA	GD	Pts	W	D	L	GF	GA	GD	W	D	L	GF	GA	GD
18	3	4	11	20	30	−10	13	1	3	5	11	15	−4	2	1	6	9	15	−6

Last updated: 2 April 2023.
Source: https://keepup.com.au/a-league-women/results/2022-2023

=== Results by round ===
Round	1	2	3	4	5	6	7	8	9	10	11	12	13	14	15	16	17	18	19	20
Ground	H	H	A	A	H	B	A	H	A	A	H	A	B	A	H	H	A	H	A	H
Result	L	L	L	L	L	B	W	D	L	L	W	D	B	L	L	D	W	L	L	D
Position	11	11	11	11	11	11	11	11	11	11	11	11	11	11	11	11	11	11	11	11

Updated to match(es) played on 2 April 2023. Source: A-League Women
A = Away; H = Home; B = Bye; W = Win; D = Draw; L = Loss

== Squad statistics ==
=== Appearances and goals ===
As of 1 April 2023

No.	Pos	Nat	Player	Total		A-League	
No.	Pos	Nat	Player	Apps	Goals	Apps	Goals
Goalkeepers:
1	GK	(New Zealand) NZL	Lily Alfeld	0	0	0	0
12	GK	(New Zealand) NZL	Brianna Edwards	17	0	17	0
22	GK	(New Zealand) NZL	Georgia Candy	1	0	1	0
Defenders:
2	DF	(New Zealand) NZL	Saskia Vosper	12	0	3+9	0
3	DF	(New Zealand) NZL	Kate Taylor	12	1	12	1
4	DF	(New Zealand) NZL	Mackenzie Barry	18	0	18	0
5	DF	(New Zealand) NZL	Marisa van der Meer	17	3	17	3
15	DF	(New Zealand) NZL	Zoe McMeeken	7	0	1+6	0
17	DF	(Australia) AUS	Claudo Cicco	13	0	5+8	0
19	DF	(New Zealand) NZL	Charlotte Lancaster	8	0	1+7	0
21	DF	(New Zealand) NZL	Michaela Foster	18	1	18	1
Midfielders:
6	MF	(Australia) AUS	Isabel Gomez	5	0	0+5	0
7	MF	(New Zealand) NZL	Chloe Knott	18	1	18	1
10	MF	(New Zealand) NZL	Alyssa Whinham	8	0	4+4	0
11	MF	(New Zealand) NZL	Betsy Hassett	15	2	15	2
14	MF	(New Zealand) NZL	Michaela Robertson	16	1	10+6	1
18	MF	(New Zealand) NZL	Te Reremoana Walker	5	0	0+5	0
Forwards:
8	FW	(New Zealand) NZL	Grace Wisnewski	14	2	14	2
9	FW	(New Zealand) NZL	Ava Pritchard	18	3	14+4	3
13	FW	(New Zealand) NZL	Paige Satchell	15	1	13+2	1
16	FW	(New Zealand) NZL	Emma Rolston	11	0	8+3	0
20	FW	(New Zealand) NZL	Milly Clegg	16	4	9+7	4
25	FW	(New Zealand) NZL	Emma Main	2	0	0+2	0

- Source: Wellington Phoenix

=== Clean sheets ===
Includes all competitive matches. The list is sorted by squad number when total clean sheets are equal.

As of 1 April 2023

Rank	Pos.	No.	Player	A-League	Total
1	GK	12	(New Zealand) Brianna Edwards	2	2

=== Disciplinary records ===
Includes all competitive matches. The list is sorted by squad number when total disciplinary records are equal.

As of 1 April 2023

Pos.	No.	Name	A-League		Total	
Pos.	No.	Name	Yellow card	Red card	Yellow card	Red card
DF	3	(New Zealand) Kate Taylor	0	1	0	1
FW	16	(New Zealand) Emma Rolston	0	1	0	1
DF	5	(New Zealand) Marisa van der Meer	3	0	3	0
DF	21	(New Zealand) Michaela Foster	3	0	3	0
FW	8	(New Zealand) Grace Wisnewski	2	0	2	0
FW	9	(New Zealand) Ava Pritchard	2	0	2	0
FW	13	(New Zealand) Paige Satchell	2	0	2	0
MF	18	(New Zealand) Te Reremoana Walker	2	0	2	0
DF	2	(New Zealand) Saskia Vosper	1	0	1	0
DF	4	(New Zealand) Mackenzie Barry	1	0	1	0
MF	6	(Australia) Isabel Gomez	1	0	1	0
MF	7	(New Zealand) Chloe Knott	1	0	1	0
MF	11	(New Zealand) Betsy Hassett	1	0	1	0
FW	20	(New Zealand) Milly Clegg	1	0	1	0

== Awards ==
=== Players ===
No.	Pos.	Player	Award	Source
21	DF	(New Zealand) Michaela Foster	Wellington Phoenix Player of the Year	
21	DF	(New Zealand) Michaela Foster	Wellington Phoenix Players' Player of the Year	
21	DF	(New Zealand) Michaela Foster	Wellington Phoenix Members' Player of the Year	
21	DF	(New Zealand) Michaela Foster	Wellington Phoenix Media Player of the Year	
21	DF	(New Zealand) Michaela Foster	Wellington Phoenix Goal of the Year	
20	FW	(New Zealand) Milly Clegg	Wellington Phoenix Under-23 Player of the Year	
1	GK	(New Zealand) Lily Alfeld	Lloyd Morrison Spirit of the Phoenix award	

== See also ==
2022–23 Wellington Phoenix FC season
