= 2016–17 Wellington Phoenix FC season =

Wellington Phoenix
2016–17 season
- Chairman: Rob Morrison
- Manager: Ernie Merrick (to 5 December 2016); Chris Greenacre & Des Buckingham (caretakers from 5 December 2016 to 2 January 2017); Des Buckingham (from 2 January 2017)
- Stadium: Westpac Stadium, Wellington
- A-League: 7th
- Stirling Sports Premiership: 7th
- A-League Finals Series: DNQ
- FFA Cup: Round of 32
- Top goalscorer: League: Roy Krishna (12 goals); All: Roy Krishna (12 goals)
- Highest home attendance: 10,034 vs Melbourne City; 8 October 2016
- Lowest home attendance: 4,828 vs Newcastle Jets; 26 March 2017
- Average home league attendance: 6,211
Home colours	Away colours

The 2016–17 Wellington Phoenix FC season was the club's tenth season since its establishment in 2007. The club participated in the A-League for the tenth time, the FFA Cup for the third time, and fielded a reserves squad in the Stirling Sports Premiership for the third time.

== Players ==
=== Squad information ===
Note: Flags indicate national team as defined under FIFA eligibility rules; some limited exceptions apply. Players may hold more than one non-FIFA nationality.

No.	Pos.	Nation	Player
1	GK	NZL	Glen Moss
4	MF	CUW	Roly Bonevacia
5	DF	AUS	Ryan Lowry
6	DF	AUS	Dylan Fox
7	MF	BRA	Gui Finkler
8	MF	ESP	Alex Rodriguez
9	FW	NZL	Kosta Barbarouses
10	MF	NZL	Michael McGlinchey
11	FW	NZL	Hamish Watson
12	MF	AUS	Adam Parkhouse
13	DF	ITA	Marco Rossi

No.	Pos.	Nation	Player
14	MF	NZL	Alex Rufer
15	MF	NZL	James McGarry
16	DF	NZL	Louis Fenton
17	MF	AUS	Vince Lia
19	DF	NZL	Tom Doyle
20	GK	AUS	Lewis Italiano
21	FW	FIJ	Roy Krishna
22	DF	NZL	Andrew Durante (captain)
23	MF	NZL	Matthew Ridenton
24	FW	NZL	Logan Rogerson (Youth)
30	GK	NZL	Oliver Sail

=== From youth squad ===
N	Pos.	Nat.	Name	Age	Notes
30	GK	(New Zealand)	Oliver Sail	21	

=== Transfers in ===
No.	Pos.	Nat.	Name	Age	Moving from	Type	Transfer window	Ends	Transfer fee	Source
9	FW	(New Zealand)	Kosta Barbarouses	26	Melbourne Victory (Australia)	Transfer	Pre-season	2019	Free	
7	MF	(Brazil)	Guilherme Finkler	30	Melbourne Victory (Australia)	Transfer	Pre-season	2018	Free	
13	DF	(Italy)	Marco Rossi	28	Perugia (Italy)	Transfer	Pre-season	2018	Free	
12	MF	(Australia)	Adam Parkhouse	23	Manly United (Australia)	Transfer	Pre-season	2017	Free	
2	DF	(Australia)	Jacob Tratt	22	Sydney United (Australia)	Transfer	Pre-season	2017	Free	
5	DF	(Australia)	Ryan Lowry	22	ECU Joondalup (Australia)	Transfer	Pre-Season	2017	Free	
18	MF	(Australia)	Ben Litfin	21	Gold Coast City (Australia)	Transfer	Mid-season	2017	Free	
99	FW	(New Zealand)	Shane Smeltz	35		Transfer	Mid-season	2017	Free	

=== Transfers out ===
No.	Pos.	Nat.	Name	Age	Moving to	Type	Transfer window	Transfer fee	Source
18	DF	(New Zealand)	Ben Sigmund	35		Retired	Pre-season		
2	DF	(Malta)	Manny Muscat	31	Melbourne City (Australia)	Transfer	Pre-season		
3	DF	(New Zealand)	Justin Gulley	23	Wellington United	Transfer	Pre-season		
13	MF	(Spain)	Albert Riera	32		Retired	Pre-season		
5	DF	(Australia)	Troy Danaskos	24		End of Contract	Pre-season		
11	MF	(New Zealand)	Kwabena Appiah	24		End of Contract	Pre-season		
12	FW	(Australia)	Blake Powell	25		Released	Pre-season		
18	MF	(Australia)	Ben Litfin	21		Released	Mid-season		
99	FW	(New Zealand)	Shane Smeltz	35	Borneo (Indonesia)	Released	Mid-season		
2	DF	(Australia)	Jacob Tratt	22		Released	Mid-season		

=== Contracts extensions ===
Name	Position	Duration	Contract Expiry	Notes
(New Zealand) Hamish Watson	Centre forward	1 year	2017	
(Australia) Vince Lia	Defensive midfielder	1 year	2017	
(New Zealand) Alex Rufer	Attacking midfielder	2 years	2018	
(Australia) Adam Parkhouse	Winger	2 years	2019	
(New Zealand) Tom Doyle	Left back	2 years	2019	

== Technical staff ==
Position	Name
Head Coach	(England) Des Buckingham
Co-Coach	(England) Chris Greenacre
Reserves Team Coach	(England) Andy Hedge
Strength & Conditioning Coach	(Scotland) Lee Spence

== Statistics ==
=== Squad statistics ===
N	Pos.	Nat.	Name	Total					A-League					FFA Cup					Stirling Sports Premiership
N	Pos.	Nat.	Name	Apps	Goals	Yellow card	Second yellow card	Red card	Apps	Goals	Yellow card	Second yellow card	Red card	Apps	Goals	Yellow card	Second yellow card	Red card	Apps	Goals	Yellow card	Second yellow card	Red card
1	GK	(New Zealand)	Glen Moss	23	0	1	0	0	22+0	0	1	0	0	1+0	0	0	0	0	0+0	0	0	0	0
4	MF	(Curaçao)	Roly Bonevacia	27	4	7	0	0	22+4	4	6	0	0	1+0	0	1	0	0	0+0	0	0	0	0
5	DF	(Australia)	Ryan Lowry	15	0	0	0	0	7+1	0	0	0	0	0+0	0	0	0	0	6+1	0	0	0	0
6	DF	(Australia)	Dylan Fox	15	0	2	1	0	4+2	0	1	1	0	1+0	0	0	0	0	8+0	0	1	0	0
7	MF	(Brazil)	Gui Finkler	25	6	6	0	0	19+5	6	5	0	0	1+0	0	1	0	0	0+0	0	0	0	0
8	MF	(Spain)	Alex Rodriguez	24	1	6	0	0	20+3	1	6	0	0	0+1	0	0	0	0	0+0	0	0	0	0
9	FW	(New Zealand)	Kosta Barbarouses	26	6	2	0	0	25+0	5	1	0	0	1+0	1	1	0	0	0+0	0	0	0	0
10	MF	(New Zealand)	Michael McGlinchey	14	3	2	0	0	7+6	3	2	0	0	1+0	0	0	0	0	0+0	0	0	0	0
11	FW	(New Zealand)	Hamish Watson	24	4	0	0	0	7+14	2	0	0	0	1+0	1	0	0	0	2+0	1	0	0	0
12	MF	(Australia)	Adam Parkhouse	20	0	2	0	0	13+5	0	2	0	0	0+0	0	0	0	0	2+0	0	0	0	0
13	DF	(Italy)	Marco Rossi	23	0	7	0	0	23+0	0	7	0	0	0+0	0	0	0	0	0+0	0	0	0	0
14	MF	(New Zealand)	Alex Rufer	10	1	2	0	0	0+3	0	1	0	0	0+0	0	0	0	0	7+0	1	1	0	0
15	MF	(New Zealand)	James McGarry	15	2	3	0	0	0+1	0	1	0	0	0+0	0	0	0	0	14+0	2	2	0	0
16	DF	(New Zealand)	Louis Fenton	10	0	1	0	0	1+5	0	0	0	0	0+0	0	0	0	0	4+0	0	1	0	0
17	MF	(Australia)	Vince Lia	27	1	8	0	0	26+0	1	8	0	0	1+0	0	0	0	0	0+0	0	0	0	0
19	DF	(New Zealand)	Tom Doyle	19	1	5	0	0	14+4	1	5	0	0	1+0	0	0	0	0	0+0	0	0	0	0
20	GK	(Australia)	Lewis Italiano	14	0	1	0	0	5+0	0	0	0	0	0+0	0	0	0	0	9+0	0	1	0	0
21	FW	(Fiji)	Roy Krishna	25	12	3	0	1	25+0	12	3	0	1	0+0	0	0	0	0	0+0	0	0	0	0
22	DF	(New Zealand)	Andrew Durante	23	0	8	0	0	22+0	0	7	0	0	1+0	0	1	0	0	0+0	0	0	0	0
23	MF	(New Zealand)	Matthew Ridenton	22	2	1	0	0	6+9	1	1	0	0	1+0	0	0	0	0	6+0	1	0	0	0
24	FW	(New Zealand)	Logan Rogerson	19	3	2	0	0	0+3	0	0	0	0	0+0	0	0	0	0	16+0	3	2	0	0
25	MF	(New Zealand)	Sarpreet Singh	16	3	4	0	0	0+2	0	1	0	0	0+0	0	0	0	0	13+1	3	3	0	0
26	DF	(New Zealand)	Jack-Henry Sinclair	14	0	3	1	0	0+0	0	0	0	0	0+0	0	0	0	0	13+1	0	3	1	0
27	MF	(New Zealand)	Joe Bell	8	0	3	0	0	0+0	0	0	0	0	0+0	0	0	0	0	6+2	0	3	0	0
28	MF	(New Zealand)	Max Mata	10	5	0	0	0	0+0	0	0	0	0	0+0	0	0	0	0	8+2	5	0	0	0
29	MF	(New Zealand)	Liam Wood	15	0	3	0	0	0+0	0	0	0	0	0+0	0	0	0	0	12+3	0	3	0	0
30	GK	(New Zealand)	Oliver Sail	8	0	1	0	0	0+0	0	0	0	0	0+0	0	0	0	0	8+0	0	1	0	0
31	DF	(New Zealand)	Sam Philip	8	0	1	0	0	0+0	0	0	0	0	0+0	0	0	0	0	5+3	0	1	0	0
32	DF	(New Zealand)	Jake Williams	6	0	0	0	0	0+0	0	0	0	0	0+0	0	0	0	0	4+2	0	0	0	0
33	DF	(New Zealand)	Liam Moore	2	0	0	0	0	0+0	0	0	0	0	0+0	0	0	0	0	2+0	0	0	0	0
34	DF	(New Zealand)	Benjamin Mata	12	0	2	0	0	0+0	0	0	0	0	0+0	0	0	0	0	12+0	0	2	0	0
35	MF	(New Zealand)	Sam Gillespie	1	0	0	0	0	0+0	0	0	0	0	0+0	0	0	0	0	0+1	0	0	0	0
36	MF	(New Zealand)	Oliver Whyte	8	0	0	0	0	0+0	0	0	0	0	0+0	0	0	0	0	2+6	0	0	0	0
37	MF	(New Zealand)	Liberato Cacace	8	0	0	0	0	0+0	0	0	0	0	0+0	0	0	0	0	4+4	0	0	0	0
38	MF	(New Zealand)	Ruairi Cahill-Fluery	15	4	0	0	0	0+0	0	0	0	0	0+0	0	0	0	0	6+9	4	0	0	0
40	DF	(New Zealand)	Luke Johnson	8	0	0	0	0	0+0	0	0	0	0	0+0	0	0	0	0	7+1	0	0	0	0
41	MF	(New Zealand)	Willem Ebbinge	4	1	0	0	0	0+0	0	0	0	0	0+0	0	0	0	0	4+0	1	0	0	0
42	DF	(New Zealand)	Luke Tongue	14	0	2	0	0	0+0	0	0	0	0	0+0	0	0	0	0	9+5	0	2	0	0
	GK	(New Zealand)	Dylan Bennet	1	0	0	0	0	0+0	0	0	0	0	0+0	0	0	0	0	0+1	0	0	0	0
	MF	(New Zealand)	Noah Clegg-Tipene	1	0	0	0	0	0+0	0	0	0	0	0+0	0	0	0	0	0+1	0	0	0	0
	FW	(New Zealand)	Matthew Conroy	3	0	0	0	0	0+0	0	0	0	0	0+0	0	0	0	0	0+3	0	0	0	0
	MF	(New Zealand)	Thomas Drillen	1	0	0	0	0	0+0	0	0	0	0	0+0	0	0	0	0	0+1	0	0	0	0
	MF	(New Zealand)	Fletcher Kelleher	1	0	0	0	0	0+0	0	0	0	0	0+0	0	0	0	0	0+1	0	0	0	0
	GK	(New Zealand)	Keegan Smith	1	0	0	1	0	0+0	0	0	0	0	0+0	0	0	0	0	1+0	0	0	1	0
	DF	(New Zealand)	Owen Smith	2	0	0	0	0	0+0	0	0	0	0	0+0	0	0	0	0	0+2	0	0	0	0
	MF	(New Zealand)	Sam Sutton	4	0	0	0	0	0+0	0	0	0	0	0+0	0	0	0	0	2+2	0	0	0	0
Players no longer at the club:
2	DF	(Australia)	Jacob Tratt	21	1	4	0	0	20+0	1	4	0	0	0+0	0	0	0	0	1+0	0	0	0	0
18	MF	(Australia)	Ben Litfin	7	0	0	0	0	0+2	0	0	0	0	0+0	0	0	0	0	5+0	0	0	0	0
99	FW	(New Zealand)	Shane Smeltz	12	3	1	1	0	9+3	3	1	1	0	0+0	0	0	0	0	0+0	0	0	0	0

- Last updated: 16 April 2017
- Source: au.soccerway.com
- (yellow card) = Number of bookings; (second yellow card) = Number of sending offs after a second yellow card; (red card) = Number of sending offs by a direct red card.

== Pre-season and friendlies ==
28 June 2016	Wairarapa United (New Zealand)	1–3	(New Zealand) Wellington Phoenix	Masterton, New Zealand
18:00 NZST	Mason-Smith 21'	Report	L. Fenton 16'; Cahill-Fleury 20'; Khouchaba 78'	Stadium: Trust House Memorial Park; Attendance: 3,300

5 July 2016	Stop Out (New Zealand)	1–5	(New Zealand) Wellington Phoenix	Lower Hutt, New Zealand
18:00 NZST	S. Gulley 52' (pen.)	Report	McGarry 30'; Fenton 35' (pen.); Watson 40', 80'; Bonevacia 62'	Stadium: Fraser Park Sportsville

12 July 2016	Wellington Phoenix (New Zealand)	7–1	(New Zealand) Miramar Rangers	Wellington, New Zealand
18:00 NZST	Barbarouses 8', 27' (pen.); Finkler 10' (pen.), 19'; Doyle 35'; Bonevacia 44'; Hare 69'	Report	Bredeveldt 89'	Stadium: Alex Moore Park

27 July 2016 Huawei Capital Cup	Beijing BG (China)	1–2	(New Zealand) Wellington Phoenix	Beijing, China
	Bu 4'	Report	Watson 15'; Finkler 41'	Stadium: Olympic Sports Stadium; Attendance: 20,000

3 September 2016	Wellington Phoenix (New Zealand)	3–0	(New Zealand) Capital Football Select	Raumati Beach, New Zealand
12:00 NZST	Barbarouses 15'; McGlinchey 45+2'; Rodriguez 73'	Report		Stadium: Weka Park; Attendance: 2,000

11 September 2016	Melbourne City (Australia)	1–4	(New Zealand) Wellington Phoenix	Townsville, Australia
15:00 AEST	Cahill 15'	Report	Krishna 19', 45+1'; Finkler 40', 56'	Stadium: Townsville Sports Reserve; Attendance: 3,856

17 September 2016	Central Coast Mariners (Australia)	0–1	(New Zealand) Wellington Phoenix	Wahroonga, Australia
15:00 AEST		Report	Watson 37'	Stadium: Knox Grammar School; Attendance: 1,500

24 September 2016	Tasman United (New Zealand)	0–1	(New Zealand) Phoenix Premiers	Nelson, New Zealand
13:15 NZST		Report	Watson	Stadium: Trafalgar Park

24 September 2016	Wellington Phoenix (New Zealand)	2–1	(Australia) Central Coast Mariners	Nelson, New Zealand
16:00 NZST	Barbarouses 22' (pen.); Krishna 49'	Report	Pain 31'	Stadium: Trafalgar Park

14 February 2017 Huawei Capital Cup	Wellington Phoenix (New Zealand)	1–0	(China) Beijing BG	Wellington, New Zealand
	Barbarouses 57' (pen.)	Report		Stadium: Westpac Stadium; Referee: Alan Milliner

== Competitions ==
=== Overall ===
Competition	Started round	Final position / round	First match	Last match
A-League	7th	7th	8 October 2016	16 April 2017
FFA Cup	Round of 32	Round of 32	2 August 2016	2 August 2016
Stirling Sports Premiership	—	7th	22 October 2016	12 March 2017

=== A-League ===
==== League table ====
Pos	Team	Pld	W	D	L	GF	GA	GD	Pts	Qualification
1	Sydney FC (C)	27	20	6	1	55	12	+43	66	Qualification for 2018 AFC Champions League group stage and Finals series
2	Melbourne Victory	27	15	4	8	49	31	+18	49	Qualification for 2018 AFC Champions League group stage and Finals series
3	Brisbane Roar	27	11	9	7	43	37	+6	42	Qualification for 2018 AFC Champions League second preliminary round and Finals series
4	Melbourne City	27	11	6	10	49	44	+5	39	Qualification for Finals series
5	Perth Glory	27	10	9	8	53	53	0	39	Qualification for Finals series
6	Western Sydney Wanderers	27	8	12	7	35	35	0	36	Qualification for Finals series
7	Wellington Phoenix (Note: Wellington Phoenix cannot qualify for the AFC Champions League as they are not recognised as an AFC club.)	27	8	6	13	41	46	−5	30	
8	Central Coast Mariners	27	6	5	16	31	52	−21	23	
9	Adelaide United	27	5	8	14	25	46	−21	23	
10	Newcastle Jets	27	5	7	15	28	53	−25	22	

Source: A-Leagues
Rules for classification: 1) points; 2) goal difference; 3) number of goals scored.
(C) Champions

==== Results summary ====
Overall								Home						Away					
Pld	W	D	L	GF	GA	GD	Pts	W	D	L	GF	GA	GD	W	D	L	GF	GA	GD
27	8	6	13	41	46	−5	30	5	4	5	22	17	+5	3	2	8	19	29	−10

Last updated: 16 April 2017.
Source: ultimatealeague.com

==== Results by round ====
Round	1	2	3	4	5	6	7	8	9	10	11	12	13	14	15	16	17	18	19	20	21	22	23	24	25	26	27
Ground	H	A	H	A	H	A	H	A	A	H	H	A	H	A	H	H	A	H	A	H	A	H	A	H	A	H	A
Result	L	L	L	L	W	W	W	L	L	W	D	D	D	L	W	L	D	L	L	L	W	D	L	W	W	D	L
Position	9	10	10	10	9	6	8	9	10	8	8	8	8	8	7	6	7	8	8	8	8	7	7	7	7	7	7

Updated to match(es) played on 16 April 2017. Source: ultimatealeague.com
A = Away; H = Home; W = Win; D = Draw; L = Loss

==== Matches ====
8 October 2016 1	Wellington Phoenix	0–1	Melbourne City	Wellington
19:35 NZDT		Report	Cáceres 31'	Stadium: Westpac Stadium; Attendance: 10,034; Referee: Peter Green

16 October 2016 2	Perth Glory	2–0	Wellington Phoenix	Perth
16:00 AWST	Castro 48' (pen.); Marinković 66'	Report		Stadium: nib Stadium; Attendance: 11,209; Referee: Daniel Elder

23 October 2016 3	Wellington Phoenix	0–1	Sydney FC	Wellington
19:00 NZDT		Report	Ninković 90+2'	Stadium: Westpac Stadium; Attendance: 7,365; Referee: Kurt Ams

31 October 2016 4	Melbourne Victory	6–1	Wellington Phoenix	Melbourne
19:50 AEDT	Berisha 20' (pen.), 22' (pen.), 82'; Rojas 71', 77'; Austin 90+2'	Report	Krishna 63' (pen.)	Stadium: Etihad Stadium; Attendance: 20,113; Referee: Alan Milliner

5 November 2016 5	Wellington Phoenix	2–0	Newcastle Jets	Wellington
19:35 NZDT	Krishna 21', 41'	Report		Stadium: Westpac Stadium; Attendance: 5,832; Referee: Shaun Evans

12 November 2016 6	Central Coast Mariners	0–2	Wellington Phoenix	Canberra
17:35 AEDT		Report	Krishna 49'; Watson 56'	Stadium: GIO Stadium; Attendance: 5,497; Referee: Stephen Lucas

27 November 2016 8	Melbourne City	2–1	Wellington Phoenix	Melbourne
17:00 AEDT	Fitzgerald 44'; Fornaroli 71' (pen.)	Report	Krishna 59'	Stadium: AAMI Park; Attendance: 10,644; Referee: Kurt Ams

4 December 2016 9	Adelaide United	2–0	Wellington Phoenix	Adelaide
18:30 ACDT	Henrique 26', 39'	Report		Stadium: Coopers Stadium; Attendance: 8,539; Referee: Stephen Lucas

10 December 2016 10	Wellington Phoenix	3–0	Central Coast Mariners	Hamilton
15:35 NZDT	Watson 2'; Lia 66'; Krishna 90+4'	Report		Stadium: Waikato Stadium; Attendance: 5,234; Referee: Matthew Conger

17 December 2016 11	Wellington Phoenix	2–2	Western Sydney Wanderers	Auckland
15:35 NZDT	Finkler 62' (pen.); Krishna 68'	Report	Šantalab 20'; Nichols 56'	Stadium: Mount Smart Stadium; Attendance: 5,702; Referee: Peter Green

26 December 2016 12	Newcastle Jets	2–2	Wellington Phoenix	Newcastle
17:35 AEDT	Hoole 48'; Nabbout 62'	Report	Barbarouses 35'; Finkler 50'	Stadium: McDonald Jones Stadium; Attendance: 8,451; Referee: Jarred Gillett

1 January 2017 13	Wellington Phoenix	0–0	Adelaide United	Wellington
19:35 NZDT		Report		Stadium: Westpac Stadium; Attendance: 5,548; Referee: Matthew Conger

5 January 2017 14	Perth Glory	2–1	Wellington Phoenix	Perth
18:00 AWST	Ro. Griffiths 45+1'; Taggart 51'	Report	Krishna 11'	Stadium: nib Stadium; Attendance: 9,210; Referee: Shaun Evans

14 January 2017 15	Wellington Phoenix	1–0	Central Coast Mariners	Wellington
15:35 NZDT	McGlinchey 9'	Report		Stadium: Westpac Stadium; Attendance: 6,061; Referee: Jarred Gillett

17 January 2017 7	Wellington Phoenix	3–0	Melbourne Victory	Wellington
19:45 NZDT	Bonevacia 33'; Tratt 89'; Barbarouses 90+3'	Report		Stadium: Westpac Stadium; Attendance: 5,865; Referee: Kris Griffiths-Jones

21 January 2017 16	Wellington Phoenix	0–1	Brisbane Roar	Wellington
19:35 NZDT		Report	Maclaren 87'	Stadium: Westpac Stadium; Attendance: 6,449; Referee: Jonathan Barreiro

29 January 2017 17	Adelaide United	2–2	Wellington Phoenix	Adelaide
16:30 ACDT	McGree 7'; Mileusnic 80'	Report	Doyle 11'; Krishna 37'	Stadium: Coopers Stadium; Attendance: 8,313; Referee: Peter Green

4 February 2017 18	Wellington Phoenix	1–3	Western Sydney Wanderers	New Plymouth
19:35 NZDT	Smeltz 71'	Report	Šantalab 21', 65'; N. Martínez 58'	Stadium: Yarrow Stadium; Attendance: 5,185; Referee: Adam Fielding

9 February 2017 19	Sydney FC	3–1	Wellington Phoenix	Sydney
19:50 AEDT	R. Grant 3'; Bobô 22'; Ninković 54'	Report	Rodriguez 32'	Stadium: Allianz Stadium; Attendance: 8,380; Referee: Kurt Ams

18 February 2017 20	Wellington Phoenix	1–5	Melbourne City	Wellington
19:35 NZDT	Barbarouses 70'	Report	Lowry 20' (o.g.); Fornaroli 29'; Cáceres 59'; Kilkenny 82'; Colazo 87'	Stadium: Westpac Stadium; Attendance: 6,131; Referee: Jonathan Barreiro

25 February 2017 21	Brisbane Roar	1–2	Wellington Phoenix	Brisbane
16:35 AEST	Borrello 75'	Report	Smeltz 32'; Krishna 61'	Stadium: Suncorp Stadium; Attendance: 10,723; Referee: Kris Griffiths-Jones

4 March 2017 22	Wellington Phoenix	3–3	Perth Glory	Auckland
19:35 NZDT	Finkler 10'; Krishna 25'; Barbarouses 47'	Report	Keogh 34'; Taggart 67'; Castro 81'	Stadium: QBE Stadium; Attendance: 6,285; Referee: Stephen Lucas

19 March 2017 23	Western Sydney Wanderers	3–1	Wellington Phoenix	Sydney
19:00 AEDT	N. Martínez 9'; Santalab 40', 48'	Report	Finkler 76'	Stadium: Spotless Stadium; Attendance: 7,828; Referee: Daniel Elder

26 March 2017 24	Wellington Phoenix	5–0	Newcastle Jets	Wellington
19:00 NZDT	Barbarouses 24'; Finkler 37'; Ridenton 49'; Hoffman 66' (o.g.); Bonevacia 86'	Report		Stadium: Westpac Stadium; Attendance: 4,828; Referee: Jonathan Barreiro

2 April 2017 25	Melbourne Victory	0–3	Wellington Phoenix	Melbourne
17:00 AEST		Report	Bonevacia 9', 26'; Smeltz 90'	Stadium: AAMI Park; Attendance: 17,011; Referee: Jarred Gillett

8 April 2017 26	Wellington Phoenix	1–1	Sydney FC	Wellington
19:45 NZST	McGlinchey 90+3'	Report	Bobô 72' (pen.)	Stadium: Westpac Stadium; Attendance: 6,610; Referee: Shaun Evans

16 April 2017 27	Brisbane Roar	4–3	Wellington Phoenix	Brisbane
17:00 AEST	Holman 21', 67'; Borrello 51'; Maclaren 53'	Report	Krishna 6'; Finkler 38'; McGlinchey 41'	Stadium: Suncorp Stadium; Attendance: 12,098; Referee: Kris Griffiths-Jones

=== FFA Cup ===
2 August 2016 Round of 32	Western Sydney Wanderers (New South Wales)	3–2	(New Zealand) Wellington Phoenix	Sydney
20:00 AEST	Scott 40', 48'; Nichols 70'	Report	Watson 9'; Barbarouses 31'	Stadium: Campbelltown Stadium; Attendance: 3,212; Referee: Stephen Lucas

=== Stirling Sports Premiership ===
==== League table ====
Pos	Team	Pld	W	D	L	GF	GA	GD	Pts	Qualification
1	Auckland City	18	11	3	4	35	15	+20	36	Qualification to the Champions League and Finals series
2	Team Wellington	18	11	3	4	51	32	+19	36	Qualification to the Finals series
3	Waitakere United	18	10	4	4	31	25	+6	34	Qualification to the Finals series
4	Hawke's Bay United	18	10	2	6	46	30	+16	32	Qualification to the Finals series
5	Eastern Suburbs	18	9	3	6	28	25	+3	30	
6	Canterbury United	18	6	6	6	32	28	+4	24	
7	Wellington Phoenix Reserves	18	6	4	8	25	33	−8	22	
8	Tasman United	18	4	5	9	29	42	−13	17	
9	Hamilton Wanderers	18	4	1	13	24	50	−26	13	
10	Southern United	18	3	1	14	20	41	−21	10	

Updated to match(es) played on 19 March 2017. Source: NZ Football

==== Results summary ====
Overall								Home						Away					
Pld	W	D	L	GF	GA	GD	Pts	W	D	L	GF	GA	GD	W	D	L	GF	GA	GD
18	6	4	8	25	33	−8	22	3	1	5	14	19	−5	3	3	3	11	14	−3

Last updated: 12 March 2017.
Source: soccerway.com

==== Results by round ====
Round	1	2	3	4	5	6	7	8	9	10	11	12	13	14	15	16	17	18
Ground	H	A	H	A	H	A	A	H	A	A	H	A	H	H	A	H	A	H
Result	L	W	D	L	W	W	L	W	D	D	L	D	L	W	L	L	W	L
Position	8	6	6	8	6	5	6	4	5							7	7	7

Updated to match(es) played on 19 March 2017. Source: soccerway.com
A = Away; H = Home; W = Win; D = Draw; L = Loss

==== Matches ====
22 October 2016 1	Wellington Phoenix	1–2	Eastern Suburbs	Wellington
14:00	Ebbinge 53'	Report	Burfoot 56'; Payne 58'	Stadium: David Farrington Park; Referee: Cory Mills

30 October 2016 2	Team Wellington	1–2	Wellington Phoenix	Wellington
14:00	Harris 19'	Report	M. Mata 76', 90+2'	Stadium: David Farrington Park; Referee: Matthew Conger

5 November 2016 3	Wellington Phoenix	1–1	Tasman United	Wellington
16:15	M. Mata 66'	Report	Ridsdale 33'	Stadium: Westpac Stadium; Referee: Ben O'Connell

13 November 2016 4	Canterbury United	4–1	Wellington Phoenix	Christchurch
14:00	Schwarz 43'; Clapham 64' (pen.); Hoyle 72', 84'	Report	Cahill-Fleury 28'	Stadium: ASB Football Park; Referee: Peter Linney

20 November 2016 5	Wellington Phoenix	1–0	Auckland City	Wellington
14:00	Rogerson 86'	Report		Stadium: David Farrington Park; Referee: John Rowbury

27 November 2016 6	Southern United	0–1	Wellington Phoenix	Dunedin
17:00		Report	M. Mata 25'	Stadium: Forsyth Barr Stadium; Referee: Antony Riley

4 December 2016 7	Hawke's Bay United	2–0	Wellington Phoenix	Napier
13:00	Kilkolly 16'; Barbero 81'	Report		Stadium: Bluewater Stadium; Referee: Antony Riley

10 December 2016 8	Wellington Phoenix	4–0	Hamilton Wanderers	Hamilton
16:45	Cahill-Fleury 57', 72'; M. Mata 88'; Rufer 90+2' (pen.)	Report		Stadium: FMG Stadium; Referee: Anna-Marie Keighley

17 December 2016 9	Waitakere United	2–2	Wellington Phoenix	Auckland
14:00	Morgan 16'; Thelen 83' (pen.)	Report	Singh 89', 90+4'	Stadium: The Trusts Arena; Referee: John Rowbury

8 January 2017 10	Eastern Suburbs	1–1	Wellington Phoenix	Auckland
14:00	Lovemore 74'	Report	Prattley 56' (o.g.)	Stadium: Bill McKinlay Park; Referee: Antony Riley

14 January 2017 11	Wellington Phoenix	1–3	Team Wellington	Wellington
16:15	Moretti 70' (o.g.)	Report	Stevens 14'; Gulley 73'; Jackson 90+1'	Stadium: Westpac Stadium; Referee: Cory Mills

22 January 2017 12	Tasman United	1–1	Wellington Phoenix	Nelson
14:00	Hajdari 73'	Report	Watson 32'	Stadium: Trafalgar Park; Referee: Nick Waldron

29 January 2017 13	Wellington Phoenix	1–4	Canterbury United	Wellington
14:00	Cahill-Fleury 78'	Report	Hoyle 29', 37'; Williams 49' (o.g.); De Jong 70'	Stadium: Newtown Park; Referee: Matthew Conger

6 February 2017 14	Wellington Phoenix	3–0	Southern United	Wellington
14:00	Howard 8' (o.g.); Ridenton 73' (pen.); Rogerson 82'	Report		Stadium: Newtown Park; Referee: John Rowbury

12 February 2017 15	Auckland City	2–0	Wellington Phoenix	Auckland
16:35	Tavano 9'; Lewis 53' (pen.)	Report		Stadium: Kiwitea Street; Referee: Nick Waldron

19 February 2017 16	Wellington Phoenix	2–7	Hawke's Bay United	Wellington
14:00	McGarry 10'; Rogerson 69' (pen.)	Report	Hoyle 19'; Barbero 20', 27'; Kilkolly 43'; Willox 63'; Mason-Smith 52', 89'	Stadium: Newtown Park; Referee: Cory Mills

12 March 2017 17	Hamilton Wanderers	1–3	Wellington Phoenix	Tauranga
16:35	Dowling 68'	Report	L. Williams 41' (o.g.); Singh 54'; McGarry 86'	Stadium: Links Avenue; Referee: Chris Kerr

4 March 2017 18	Wellington Phoenix	0–2	Waitakere United	Auckland
16:15		Report	Morgan 54'; B. Mata 57' (o.g.)	Stadium: QBE Stadium; Referee: Anna-Marie Keighley
