= Liberato Cacace =

New Zealand footballer (born 2000)

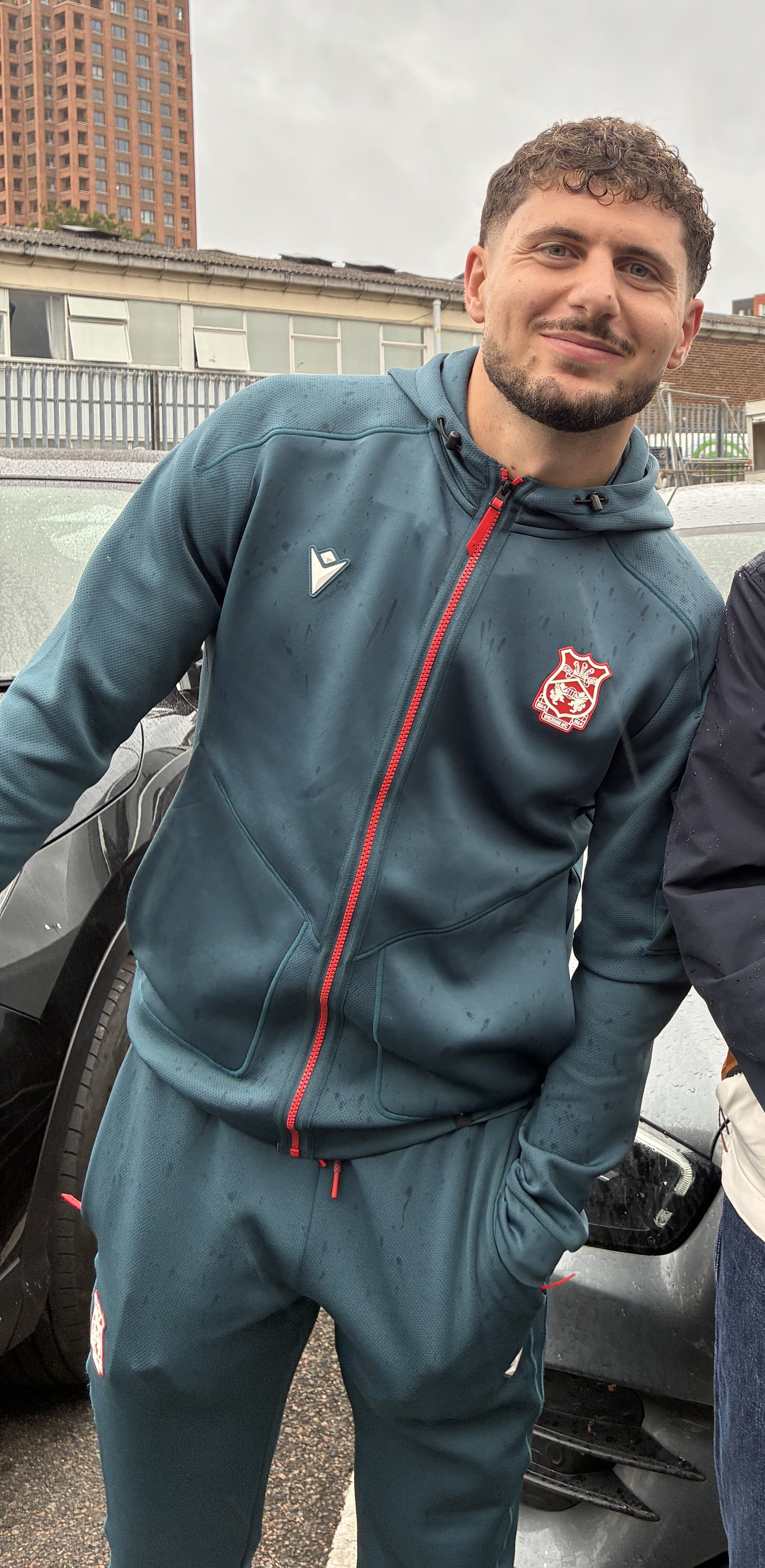
- Cacace in 2025

Personal information
- Full name: Liberato Gianpaolo Cacace
- Date of birth: 27 September 2000 (age 26)
- Place of birth: Wellington, New Zealand
- Height: 1.83 m (6 ft 0 in)
- Position: Left-back

Team information
- Current team: Wrexham
- Number: 13

Youth career
- 2006–2015: Island Bay United

Senior career*
Years	Team	Apps	(Gls)
2016–2018	Wellington Phoenix Reserves	23	(0)
2018–2020	Wellington Phoenix	58	(4)
2020–2022	Sint-Truiden	50	(0)
2022	→ Empoli (loan)	10	(0)
2022–2025	Empoli	74	(2)
2025–	Wrexham	12	(0)

International career^{‡}
2017	New Zealand U17	8	(1)
2019	New Zealand U20	3	(0)
2019–	New Zealand Olympic	2	(1)
2018–	New Zealand	40	(1)
Medal record
Men's football
Representing New Zealand
OFC Men's Nations Cup
Winner	2024 Fiji–Vanuatu
OFC U-17 Championship
Winner	2017 Samoa–Tahiti
- * Club domestic league appearances and goals as of 8 February 2026 ‡ National team caps and goals as of 27 June 2026

Liberato Gianpaolo Cacace (/kəˈkɑːtʃi/ kə-KAH-chee; born 27 September 2000) is a New Zealand professional footballer who plays as a left-back for EFL Championship club Wrexham and the New Zealand national team.

== Club career ==
=== Island Bay ===
As a youth, Cacace played for Island Bay United and was also a representative player of Capital Football for two years in their 1999 squad. He was chosen by former Wellington Phoenix and All Whites coach Ricki Herbert to be part of his junior elite academy.

Cacace also played for his school team at St Patrick's College in Wellington, alongside South Sudan international Manyumow Achol. Cacace helped his college team win the Wellington Premier Youth football league, scoring in the 2–1 final against Hutt International Boys' School.

=== Wellington Phoenix Reserves ===
Cacace started playing for the Wellington Phoenix Reserves in the New Zealand Football Championship in the 2016–17 season, making eight appearances, including four starts.

During the winter season, Cacace played with Wellington Phoenix feeder club Wellington United in the local Central League.

=== Wellington Phoenix ===
On 2 February 2018, Cacace made his debut for the senior side, coming on as a substitute in a 4–0 defeat against Sydney FC in the A-League. Following the end of the 2017–18 A-League season, and having made seven appearances for the club, Cacace signed a three-year professional contract with Wellington Phoenix.

In the 2018–19 season, following the departure of Scott Galloway and injury to Tom Doyle, Cacace became the first-choice left-back under new manager Marko Rudan, one month after his 18th birthday. Cacace scored his maiden A-League goal against Central Coast Mariners in an 8–2 victory on 9 March 2019, becoming the club's youngest ever goalscorer at 18 years and 163 days. After playing more minutes than any other Wellington Phoenix player that season, Cacace won the club's Young Player of the Year award ahead of fellow starter Sarpreet Singh.

The following season, Cacace established himself as one of Wellington's most important players, with captain Steven Taylor calling him "the best left-back in the league without a shadow of a doubt". On 8 March 2020, Cacace played his 50th game for Wellington Phoenix against Central Coast Mariners, the youngest player in the club's history to do so.

=== Sint-Truiden ===
After a stellar season with the Wellington Phoenix, Cacace signed a three-year contract with Sint-Truiden for an estimated transfer fee of around €1.2 million.

=== Empoli ===
On 31 January 2022, Cacace joined Italian Serie A club Empoli on loan, with a conditional obligation to buy. The conditions were fulfilled and Empoli purchased the rights on 17 June 2022. Across four seasons, Cacace made 76 Serie A appearances and scored 2 goals, and overall including other competitions made 83 appearances.

=== Wrexham ===
On 18 July 2025, following Empoli's relegation from Serie A, it was announced Cacace joined newly promoted EFL Championship club Wrexham for an undisclosed fee. On 9 January 2026, Cacace scored his first goal for Wrexham in a 3–3 draw in the FA Cup against Premier League side Nottingham Forest. Wrexham would go on to win 4–3 in a penalty shootout.

== International career ==
=== Youth ===
Cacace was part of the New Zealand U17 team that won the 2017 OFC U-17 Championship, where he scored one goal. This meant that the team qualified for the 2017 FIFA U-17 World Cup in India. Cacace then played at the FIFA U-17 World Cup, making his World Cup debut in the 1–1 draw with Turkey U17, before starting again in a 4–2 loss to Paraguay U17 and a 3–1 loss to Mali U17.

Cacace scored the opening goal at the 2020 Summer Olympics in New Zealand's 3–2 loss to Honduras.

=== Senior ===
Cacace was selected to join the New Zealand national team squad in the 2018 Intercontinental Cup held in India. He made his All Whites debut in Mumbai on 5 June 2018 against Chinese Taipei, in a 1–0 victory.

On 25 June 2021, Cacace was called up to the New Zealand squad for the delayed 2020 Summer Olympics.

Cacace scored against Tahiti in a 1–0 win in the semi-finals of the 2022 FIFA World Cup qualifiers.

In the 2024 OFC Nations Cup, Cacace was named as captain where he guided New Zealand to lift the trophy on 30 June 2024.

On 14 May 2026, he was named in the 26-man squad for the 2026 FIFA World Cup.

== Personal life ==
Cacace was born in Wellington to an Italian father and a New Zealand mother of Italian descent. His father Antonio arrived in the country in 1992 from Massa Lubrense, a small commune in Naples, and operates La Bella Italia, an Italian restaurant located in Petone. He attended St Patrick's College.

Cacace supports his father's hometown team, Napoli.

== Career statistics ==
=== Club ===
As of match played 8 February 2026

Appearances and goals by club, season and competition
Club	Season	League			National cup (Note: Includes Australia Cup, Belgian Cup, Coppa Italia, FA Cup)		League cup (Note: Includes EFL Cup)		Other		Total	
Club	Season	Division	Apps	Goals	Apps	Goals	Apps	Goals	Apps	Goals	Apps	Goals
Wellington Phoenix Reserves	2016–17	Premiership	8	0	—		—		—		8	0
Wellington Phoenix Reserves	2017–18	Premiership	13	0	—		—		—		13	0
Wellington Phoenix Reserves	2018–19	Premiership	2	0	—		—		—		2	0
Wellington Phoenix Reserves	Total		23	0	0	0	0	0	0	0	23	0
Wellington Phoenix	2017–18	A-League	7	0	—		—		—		7	0
Wellington Phoenix	2018–19	A-League	25	1	1	0	—		1 (Note: Appearances in A-League Finals)	0	27	1
Wellington Phoenix	2019–20	A-League	24	3	1	0	—		1	0	26	3
Wellington Phoenix	Total		56	4	2	0	0	0	2	0	60	4
Sint-Truiden	2020–21	First Division A	27	0	1	0	—		—		28	0
Sint-Truiden	2021–22	First Division A	23	0	0	0	—		—		23	0
Sint-Truiden	Total		50	0	1	0	0	0	0	0	51	0
Empoli (loan)	2021–22	Serie A	10	0	—		—		—		10	0
Empoli	2022–23	Serie A	12	0	0	0	—		—		12	0
Empoli	2023–24	Serie A	31	0	1	0	—		—		32	0
Empoli	2024–25	Serie A	33	2	6	0	—		—		39	2
Empoli	Total		76	2	7	0	0	0	0	0	83	2
Wrexham	2025–26	Championship	12	0	1	1	0	0	0	0	13	1
Career total			208	6	8	1	0	0	2	0	218	7

=== International ===
As of matches played 26 June 2026

Appearances and goals by national team and year
National team	Year	Apps	Goals
New Zealand	2018	2	0
New Zealand	2019	1	0
New Zealand	2020	0	0
New Zealand	2021	3	0
New Zealand	2022	6	1
New Zealand	2023	8	0
New Zealand	2024	11	0
New Zealand	2025	3	0
New Zealand	2026	6	0
Total		40	1

Scores and results list New Zealand's goal tally first, score column indicates score after each Cacace goal.

List of international goals scored by Liberato Cacace
No.	Date	Venue	Cap	Opponent	Score	Result	Competition
1	27 March 2022	Al-Arabi Stadium, Doha, Qatar	8	Tahiti	1–0	1–0	2022 FIFA World Cup qualification

== Honours ==
New Zealand

- OFC Nations Cup: 2024

New Zealand U17

- OFC U-17 Championship: 2017

Individual

- Wellington Phoenix U-23 Player of the Year: 2018–19
- PFA Team of the Season: 2019–20
- Harry Kewell Medal: 2019–20
- OFC Men's Nations Cup Golden Ball: 2024
