= Brianna Edwards =

New Zealand footballer

Personal information
- Full name: Brianna Jayne Edwards
- Date of birth: 27 January 2003 (age 23)
- Place of birth: Sydney, New South Wales, Australia
- Position: Goalkeeper

Team information
- Current team: Western Sydney Wanderers
- Number: 12

Youth career
- Pagewood SC
- University of New South Wales Football Club
- –2019: North West Sydney Koalas

College career
Years	Team	Apps	(Gls)
2021	Louisiana–Monroe Warhawks	2	(0)

Senior career*
Years	Team	Apps	(Gls)
2020	Football NSW Institute		
2021	Northern Tigers		
2021–2024	Wellington Phoenix	23	(0)
2022	Bankstown City	16	(0)
2023	Bankstown City	11	(0)
2024–2025	Sydney FC	9	(0)
2025–	Western Sydney Wanderers	1	(0)

International career^{‡}
2018–2019	Australia U17		
2022	New Zealand U20	3	(0)
2024–	New Zealand	1	(0)
- * Club domestic league appearances and goals as of 23 May 2026. ‡ National team caps and goals as of 23 May 2026.

Brianna Jayne Edwards (born 27 January 2003) is a professional footballer who plays as a goalkeeper for Western Sydney Wanderers. Born in Australia, she represents New Zealand internationally.

== Personal life ==
Edwards was born to parents Adam and Catherine Edwards. She is eligible to represent New Zealand through her New Zealand-born father. She has a twin sister Siobhan, who also played football with her at the University of Louisiana Monroe.

== College career ==
Edwards attended the University of Louisiana Monroe in 2021 majoring in psychology. She made 2 appearances off the bench as a freshman. After the 2021 season, Edwards returned to Australia, and considered quitting.

== Club career ==
=== Youth career ===
Edwards starting playing football at the age of eight for local club Pagewood SC. At the age of 12 she trialed and played for the University of New South Wales Football Club. She also played for numerous New South Wales representative sides in her youth.

=== Wellington Phoenix ===
Edwards signed for the Wellington Phoenix on 3 November 2021 for the clubs inaugural season in the 2021–22 A-League Women.

Edwards extended her contract on 27 July 2022 for another season. She recorded the second most saves this season keeping two clean sheets.

On 9 August 2023, Edwards signed on for the 2023–24 season. During the Phoenix's 2–0 win over Canberra United at home, Edwards came off the bench and saved a penalty after starting keeper Rylee Foster was sent off.

In July 2024, Edwards left the club together with Foster.

=== Bankstown City ===
During the A-League Women off-season, Edwards played for Bankstown City in 2022 and 2023.

=== Sydney FC ===
In July 2024, Edwards signed with Sydney FC for two seasons. A year later, in July 2025, Edwards and the club agreed to a mutual termination of her contract.

=== Western Sydney Wanderers ===
In October 2025, Edwards signed a two-year deal with cross-town rivals Western Sydney Wanderers.

== International career ==
Edwards played for the Australia women's national under-17 football team in 2018–2019. In 2020 she was part of the Australia women's national under-20 football team training camp. Edwards received her first appearance for the New Zealand women's national under-20 football team in April 2022 against her home nation, Australia. In August 2022, Edwards attended the 2022 FIFA U-20 Women's World Cup with New Zealand but didn't make an appearance.

In January 2023, Edwards received her first call up for international friendlies against the United States. She was also called up in the following international window but still did not make an appearance. Edwards made her debut for the New Zealand women's national football team on 7 February 2024 against Tonga in the 2024 OFC Women's Olympic Qualifying Tournament keeping a clean sheet in a 3–0 win.

== Career statistics ==
=== Club ===
As of match played on 4 February 2024.

Appearances and goals by club, season and competition
Club	Season	League			Cup		Others		Total	
Club	Season	Division	Apps	Goals	Apps	Goals	Apps	Goals	Apps	Goals
Wellington Phoenix	2021–22	A-League Women	2	0	—		—		2	0
Wellington Phoenix	2022–23	A-League Women	17	0	—		—		17	0
Wellington Phoenix	2023–24	A-League Women	4	0	—		—		4	0
Career total			23	0	—		—		23	0

=== International ===
As of match played on 7 February 2024.

Appearances and goals by national team and year
National team	Year	Apps	Goals
New Zealand	2024	1	0
Total		1	0
