= Lily Alfeld =

New Zealand footballer

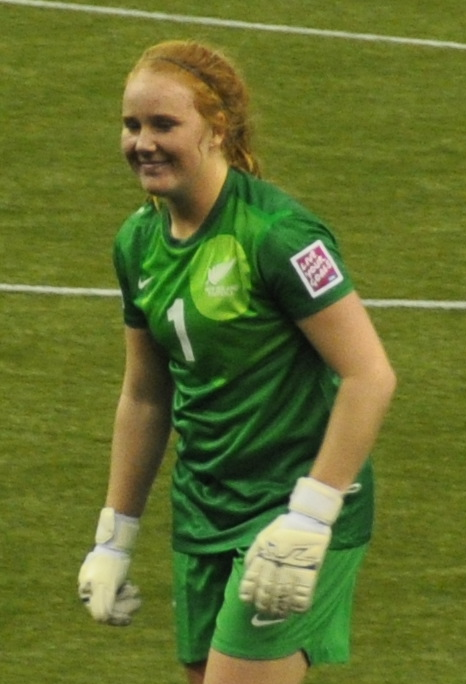

Personal information
- Full name: Lily Hannah Alfeld
- Date of birth: 4 August 1995 (age 31)
- Place of birth: Christchurch, New Zealand
- Height: 1.75 m (5 ft 9 in)
- Position: Goalkeeper

College career
Years	Team	Apps	(Gls)
2014–2018	LSU Lady Tigers	18	(0)

Senior career*
Years	Team	Apps	(Gls)
2009–2013	Coastal Spirit		
2010–2013	Mainland Pride		
2020–2021	Perth Glory	12	(0)
2021–2023	Wellington Phoenix	13	(0)

International career^{‡}
2012	New Zealand U17	7	(0)
2014	New Zealand U20	10	(0)
- * Club domestic league appearances and goals as of 4 March 2022 ‡ National team caps and goals as of 30 November 2021

Lily Hannah Alfeld (born 4 August 1995) is a New Zealand footballer who last played for and captained Wellington Phoenix. She has represented New Zealand at age group level.

== Club career ==
=== Coastal Spirit ===
Alfeld played for Coastal Spirit in Christchurch from 2009 to 2013 in the Premier Women's Football division. She was part of the winning team who won the 2013 Women's Knockout Cup. She was also part of the 2011 team who made it to the finals of the cup before losing 3–0 to Glenfield Rovers.

=== Mainland Pride ===
Alfeld played for Mainland Pride from 2010 to 2013, where she was named Mainland Football Goalkeeper of the Year three times in 2010, 2011 and 2013. She won the National Women's League with the team in 2013, beating Northern Football 4–2 in the final.

=== Perth Glory ===
Alfeld played for Perth for the 2020–21 season. She was named players' player of the year for that season.

=== Wellington Phoenix ===
On 15 October 2021, Alfeld was announced as the Wellington Phoenix's inaugural signing. Alfeld was later announced as the club's inaugural captain. After playing every match bar one of Wellington Phoenix's first season in the A-League Women, Alfeld re-signed for the 2022–23 A-League Women season in July 2022. Following injury and back surgery, it was announced Alfeld would be sidelined for all of the 2023–24 A-League Women season.

== College career ==
=== Louisiana State University ===
Alfeld gained a scholarship to attend Louisiana State University (LSU) where she played for the LSU Tigers. While she saw 16 starts in her first season, she only played two more games across the other two seasons she was with the team.

== International career ==
Alfeld has represented both the New Zealand U17's and New Zealand U20's attending 3 age group FIFA Women's World Cups.

Alfeld has received several call ups to the New Zealand women's national football team including for the 2022 SheBelieves Cup. She is yet to make her first appearance for the national side.

== Career statistics ==
=== Club ===
As of match played on 4 March 2022.

Appearances and goals by club, season and competition
Club	Season	League			Cup		Others		Total	
Club	Season	Division	Apps	Goals	Apps	Goals	Apps	Goals	Apps	Goals
Perth Glory	2020–21	W-League	12	0	—		—		12	0
Wellington Phoenix	2021–22	A-League Women	13	0	—		—		13	0
Wellington Phoenix	2022–23	A-League Women	0	0	—		—		0	0
Career total			25	0	—		—		25	0

== Honours ==
Coastal Spirit

- Women's Knockout Cup: 2013
- Reta Fitzpatrick Cup: 2011

Mainland Pride

- National Women's League: 2013

Individual

- Mainland Football Womens Goalkeeper of the Year: 2011
- Perth Glory Players' Player of the Year: 2020–21
- Wellington Phoenix Players' Player of the Year: 2021–22
- Lloyd Morrison Spirit of the Phoenix award: 2022–23
