= 2021–22 Wellington Phoenix FC (women) season =

Wellington Phoenix
2021–22 season
- Manager: Gemma Lewis
- Stadium: WIN Stadium
- A-League Women: 10th of 10
- Top goalscorer: Grace Jale (6)
- Highest home attendance: 1,309 (vs. Western Sydney Wanderers, 3 December 2021)
- Lowest home attendance: 61 (Note: Excluding the Round 4, Round 12 and Round 14 matches as they were played behind closed doors.) (vs. Melbourne Victory, 4 February 2022)
- Average home league attendance: 482
- Biggest win: 3–0 (vs. Canberra United, 11 February 2022)
- Biggest defeat: 0–5 (vs. Sydney FC, 30 December 2021)
Home colours	Away colours
- All statistics correct as of 4 March 2022.

The 2021–22 Wellington Phoenix season was the club's inaugural season in the A-League Women, the premier competition for women's football in Australia, originally known as the W-League.

The club's manager for the season was Gemma Lewis, with Natalie Lawrence as assistant.

Due to impacts related to the COVID-19 pandemic in Australia, including not being able to play home games in New Zealand, the team played their home games at WIN Stadium located in Wollongong, Australia.

== Season milestones ==
Former Perth Glory keeper and 2020–21 players’ player of the year, Lily Alfeld, was announced as the club's inaugural signing. She was later announced as the club's inaugural captain.

Wellington Phoenix started their debut season with a 0–0 draw against Western Sydney Wanderers at the Wollongong Showgrounds.

Ava Pritchard scored the club's first goal in their second game of the season, in a 1–5 loss to Newcastle Jets.

On 11 February 2022, the Phoenix achieved their first ever win in the A-League Women in a 3–0 away win against Canberra United.

They got their second win of the season against Western Sydney Wanderers, winning 3–2 on 1 March but it wasn't enough to get them off the bottom of the table and after losing their last game of the season to Perth Glory, they finished the season with the wooden spoon.

== Players ==
=== Squad information ===
As of 3 November 2021

Note: Flags indicate national team as defined under FIFA eligibility rules; some limited exceptions apply. Players may hold more than one non-FIFA nationality.

No.	Pos.	Nation	Player
1	GK	NZL	Lily Alfeld (captain)
2	DF	NZL	Saskia Vosper
3	DF	NZL	Kate Taylor (vice-captain)
4	DF	NZL	Mackenzie Barry
5	FW	AUS	Jordan Jasnos
6	MF	AUS	Isabel Gomez
7	MF	NZL	Chloe Knott
8	FW	NZL	Grace Wisnewski
9	FW	NZL	Ava Pritchard
10	MF	NZL	Grace Jale

No.	Pos.	Nation	Player
11	FW	NZL	Kelli Brown
12	GK	AUS	Brianna Edwards
13	MF	NZL	Te Reremoana Walker
14	DF	AUS	Cushla Rue
15	DF	NZL	Zoe McMeeken
16	MF	AUS	Hannah Jones
17	DF	AUS	Talitha Kramer
18	DF	AUS	Annabel Martin
19	DF	NZL	Charlotte Lancaster (scholarship)
20	MF	NZL	Alyssa Whinham

== Competitions ==
=== A-League Women ===
==== League table ====
Pos	Team	Pld	W	D	L	GF	GA	GD	Pts	Qualification
1	Sydney FC	14	11	2	1	36	6	+30	35	Qualification to Finals series
2	Melbourne City	14	11	0	3	29	11	+18	33	Qualification to Finals series
3	Adelaide United	14	9	0	5	33	18	+15	27	Qualification to Finals series
4	Melbourne Victory (C)	14	7	3	4	26	22	+4	24	Qualification to Finals series
5	Perth Glory	14	7	3	4	20	23	−3	24	
6	Brisbane Roar	14	5	2	7	29	30	−1	17	
7	Canberra United	14	2	7	5	24	29	−5	13	
8	Newcastle Jets	14	2	4	8	15	30	−15	10	
9	Western Sydney Wanderers	14	1	4	9	7	27	−20	7	
10	Wellington Phoenix	14	2	1	11	13	36	−23	7	

Source: A-Leagues
Rules for classification: 1) points; 2) goal difference; 3) number of goals scored.
(C) Champions

==== Matches ====
Win Draw Loss

- All times are in AEDT

3 December 2021 1	Wellington Phoenix	0–0	Western Sydney Wanderers	Wollongong
17:05		Report		Stadium: WIN Stadium; Attendance: 1,309; Referee: Casey Reibelt

10 December 2021 2	Newcastle Jets	5–1	Wellington Phoenix	Newcastle
17:05	Fenton 33'; Markussen 55'; Andrews 61', 62'; Harding 73'	Report	Pritchard 81'	Stadium: McDonald Jones Stadium; Attendance: 2,273; Referee: Isabella Blaess

19 December 2021 3	Sydney FC	3–0	Wellington Phoenix	Sydney
16:05	Vine 24'; Rule 53'; Hawkesby 66'	Report		Stadium: Netstrata Jubilee Stadium; Attendance: 1,045; Referee: Georgia Ghirardello

27 December 2021 4	Wellington Phoenix	0–1	Newcastle Jets	Gosford
18:45		Report	House 82'	Stadium: Central Coast Stadium; Attendance: 0 (behind closed doors); Referee: Georgia Ghirardello

30 December 2021 5	Wellington Phoenix	0–5	Sydney FC	Wollongong
17:05		Report	Lowe 4'; Hawkesby 14' (pen.), 29', 44'; Vine 38'	Stadium: WIN Stadium; Attendance: 309; Referee: Lara Lee

9 January 2022 6	Melbourne City	4–0	Wellington Phoenix	Melbourne
16:05	Torpey 29'; Wilkinson 43'; Heatley 45+3'; Checker 78'	Report		Stadium: AAMI Park; Attendance: 1,021; Referee: Caitlin Williams

16 January 2022 7	Wellington Phoenix	2–3	Brisbane Roar	Wollongong
14:05	Whinham 19'; Jale 24'	Report	Hecher 34'; Crummer 46'; Gorry 87' (pen.)	Stadium: WIN Stadium; Attendance: 247; Referee: Rebecca Mackie

21 January 2022 8	Adelaide United	1–0	Wellington Phoenix	Adelaide
18:05	Hayward 68'	Report		Stadium: Coopers Stadium; Attendance: 1,024; Referee: Caitlin Williams

31 January 2022 9	Perth Glory	3–2	Wellington Phoenix	Sydney
18:35	Sakalis 14'; Hintzen 81'; Leth Jans 88'	Report	Jale 20'; Knott 39'	Stadium: Blacktown Football Park; Attendance: 84; Referee: Rachael Mitchenson

4 February 2022 10	Wellington Phoenix	0–2	Melbourne Victory	Wollongong
16:05		Report	Alfeld 13' (o.g.); Eliadis 23'	Stadium: WIN Stadium; Attendance: 61; Referee: Caitlin Williams

11 February 2022 11	Canberra United	0–3	Wellington Phoenix	Canberra
19:45		Report	Knott 41'; Jale 50'; Haran 62' (o.g.)	Stadium: Viking Park; Referee: Rebecca Mackie

18 February 2022 12	Wellington Phoenix	1–4	Adelaide United	Wollongong
16:05	Jale 25'	Report	Dawber 5', 59'; McMeeken 34' (o.g.); Worts 55'	Stadium: WIN Stadium; Attendance: 0 (behind closed doors); Referee: Kelly Jones
Note: Game was originally meant to be played on 17 February but was postponed first due to hail and then lighting.

1 March 2022 13	Western Sydney Wanderers	2–3	Wellington Phoenix	Sydney
18:35	Crofts 2'; Copus-Brown 90+5'	Report	Taylor 37'; Pritchard 74'; Jale 90+3'	Stadium: Blacktown Football Park; Attendance: 154; Referee: Kelly Jones
Note: Game was originally meant to be played on 26 February but was postponed as the ground was deemed unfit for play.

4 March 2022 14	Wellington Phoenix	1–3	Perth Glory	Wollongong
19:05	Jale 86' (pen.)	Report	Gomez 23' (o.g.); Hintzen 61'; Keane 63'	Stadium: WIN Stadium; Attendance: 0 (behind closed doors); Referee: Rachael Mitchenson

=== Results summary ===
Overall								Home						Away					
Pld	W	D	L	GF	GA	GD	Pts	W	D	L	GF	GA	GD	W	D	L	GF	GA	GD
14	2	1	11	13	36	−23	7	0	1	6	4	18	−14	2	0	5	9	18	−9

Last updated: 6 March 2022.
Source: A-League Women

==== Results by round ====
Round	1	2	3	4	5	6	7	8	9	10	11	12	13	14
Ground	H	A	A	H	H	A	H	A	A	H	A	H	A	H
Result	D	L	L	L	L	L	L	L	L	L	W	L	W	L
Position	6	8	8	10	10	10	10	10	10	10	10	10	10	10
Points	1	1	1	1	1	1	1	1	1	1	4	4	7	7

Source: A-Leagues
A = Away; H = Home; W = Win; D = Draw; L = Loss

== Squad statistics ==
=== Appearances and goals ===
As of 4 March 2022

No.	Pos	Nat	Player	Total		A-League	
No.	Pos	Nat	Player	Apps	Goals	Apps	Goals
Goalkeepers:
1	GK	(New Zealand) NZL	Lily Alfeld	13	0	13	0
12	GK	(Australia) AUS	Brianna Edwards	2	0	1+1	0
Defenders:
2	DF	(New Zealand) NZL	Saskia Vosper	13	0	6+7	0
3	DF	(New Zealand) NZL	Kate Taylor	13	1	13	1
4	DF	(New Zealand) NZL	Mackenzie Barry	12	0	12	0
14	DF	(Australia) AUS	Cushla Rue	2	0	0+2	0
15	DF	(New Zealand) NZL	Zoe McMeeken	13	0	13	0
17	DF	(Australia) AUS	Talitha Kramer	11	0	8+3	0
18	DF	(Australia) AUS	Annabel Martin	4	0	0+4	0
19	DF	(New Zealand) NZL	Charlotte Lancaster	5	0	0+5	0
Midfielders:
6	MF	(Australia) AUS	Isabel Gomez	14	0	13+1	0
7	MF	(New Zealand) NZL	Chloe Knott	14	2	14	2
10	MF	(New Zealand) NZL	Grace Jale	11	6	10+1	6
13	MF	(New Zealand) NZL	Te Reremoana Walker	12	0	4+8	0
16	MF	(Australia) AUS	Hannah Jones	8	0	4+4	0
20	MF	(New Zealand) NZL	Alyssa Whinham	14	1	12+2	1
Forwards:
5	FW	(Australia) AUS	Jordan Jasnos	9	0	2+7	0
8	FW	(New Zealand) NZL	Grace Wisnewski	11	0	11	0
9	FW	(New Zealand) NZL	Ava Pritchard	14	2	14	2
11	FW	(New Zealand) NZL	Kelli Brown	6	0	4+2	0

- Source: Wellington Phoenix

=== Clean sheets ===
Includes all competitive matches. The list is sorted by squad number when total clean sheets are equal.

As of 4 March 2022

Rank	Pos.	No.	Player	A-League	Total
1	GK	1	(New Zealand) Lily Alfeld	2	2

=== Disciplinary records ===
Includes all competitive matches. The list is sorted by squad number when total disciplinary records are equal.

As of 4 March 2022

Pos.	No.	Name	A-League		Total	
Pos.	No.	Name	Yellow card	Red card	Yellow card	Red card
DF	17	(Australia) Talitha Kramer	4	0	4	0
MF	6	(Australia) Isabel Gomez	3	0	3	0
FW	8	(New Zealand) Grace Wisnewski	2	0	2	0
FW	9	(New Zealand) Ava Pritchard	2	0	2	0
MF	16	(Australia) Hannah Jones	2	0	2	0
DF	2	(New Zealand) Saskia Vosper	1	0	1	0
DF	3	(New Zealand) Kate Taylor	1	0	1	0
DF	4	(New Zealand) Mackenzie Barry	1	0	1	0
MF	7	(New Zealand) Chloe Knott	1	0	1	0
MF	10	(New Zealand) Grace Jale	1	0	1	0
MF	13	(New Zealand) Te Reremoana Walker	1	0	1	0

== See also ==
2021–22 Wellington Phoenix FC season
