= 2019–20 Wellington Phoenix FC season =

Wellington Phoenix
2019–20 season
- Chairman: Rob Morrison
- Manager: Ufuk Talay
- Stadium: Westpac Stadium; Eden Park
- A-League: 3rd
- A-League Finals Series: Elimination-finals
- FFA Cup: Round of 32
- Top goalscorer: League: Ulises Dávila (12 goals); All: Ulises Dávila (12 goals)
- Highest home attendance: 15,347 vs. Melbourne City (15 February 2020)
- Lowest home attendance: 6,054 vs. Perth Glory (27 October 2019)
- Average home league attendance: 8,620
Home colours	Away colours

The 2019–20 season is Wellington Phoenix's 13th season since its establishment in 2007. The club is participating in the A-League for the 13th time, the FFA Cup for the sixth time.

On 24 March 2020, the FFA announced that the 2019–20 A-League season would be postponed until further notice due to the COVID-19 pandemic in Australia and New Zealand, and subsequently extended indefinitely. The season resumed on 17 July 2020.

== Review ==
=== Pre-season ===
On 15 April, it was announced that Rudan would not see out the second year of his contract and would leave at season's end for personal reasons. On 4 May 2019, it was announced Ufuk Talay would be taking the reins of head coach after the departure of Mark Rudan on a one-year deal.

Following the end of the 2018–19 season, Phoenix released nine players including the likes of Mandi, Nathan Burns, Cillian Sheridan, Michał Kopczyński and Ryan Lowry. On 27 May, Wellington Phoenix announced that Johnny Warren Medalist and Golden boot winner Roy Krishna would be departing the club. On 11 June, it was announced that the longest serving captain Andrew Durante will departing the club along with David Williams. A week later, defender Tom Doyle also was announced as leaving the club. On 1 July, it was announced that Sarpreet Singh had departed the club for Bayern Munich II after they paid an undisclosed fee between $750,000–$1,000,000.

In his first press conference, Talay expressed his idea of building a young team with a strong Kiwi core. He made his first signing with All Whites goalkeeper Stefan Marinovic and signed local Kiwi players, Te Atawhai Hudson-Wihongi, Tim Payne, and Callum McCowatt. Talay made his first import signing with Mexican Ulises Dávila following another import signing of English striker, David Ball. On 24 July, it was announced that Steven Taylor would be the captain heading into the new season while Alex Rufer was made vice-captain. On 18 August, it was announced that Phoenix had paid an undisclosed fee for Reno Piscopo, marking the first time the club paid a transfer fee for a player. Talay also made a handful of signings of young Australian players including Walter Scott, Jaushua Sotirio, Cameron Devlin, Liam McGing, and experienced centre-back Luke DeVere. Talay used his fourth import spot signing Matti Steinmann on a one-year deal.

Talay had a positive start to his managerial tenure with the Wellington Phoenix when he led them to a 7–0 victory over Wairarapa United in a pre-season friendly in his first match in charge. They were knocked-out of the 2019 FFA Cup in the Round of 32, losing 4–2 on penalties to Brisbane Strikers, after making an extraordinary comeback from 2–0 down to a 2–2 draw at full time.

Wellington Phoenix finished with an unbeaten record in pre-season friendlies, drawing 0–0 with Sydney FC, 1–1 with Western Sydney Wanderers, and 1–1 with Melbourne Victory. They also defeated NPL opposition Wollongong Wolves 4–0 and New Zealand club Team Wellington 2–0.

=== October ===
Wellington Phoenix lost their opening game of the season falling 1–0 at home to A-League newcomers Western United coached by former coach Marko Rudan. On 17 October, Wellington Phoenix announced the signing of English striker, Gary Hooper on a one-year marquee deal.

=== November ===
Wellington Phoenix equaled their worst start to a season following 4 narrow defeats to fellow A-League clubs in the first 4 rounds picking up 0 points. In Round 5, Wellington Phoenix drew 1–1 with Melbourne Victory picking up their first point. Wellington Phoenix won their first game of season in Round 6 beating Brisbane Roar 2–1 at home. Ulises Dávila was voted for Player of the Month for November.

=== December ===
In rounds 7, 8, and 9, Wellington Phoenix were 2–1 victors over Brisbane Roar, Adelaide United and the Western Sydney Wanderers accumulating 9 points and moving up into the top six. It was the first time since 2014 Wellington Phoenix had beaten Adelaide United in Adelaide. In Round 10, Wellington Phoenix drew with Melbourne Victory in yet another draw despite having an extra man advantage. Round 11 saw Wellington Phoenix produce one of their best performances of the season playing out a 2–2 draw with champions Sydney FC despite dominating the match Wellington Phoenix finished off the year with a dominant 3–1 win over Western United away from home making the win their biggest win of the season so far. Following the win, Wellington Phoenix were described as the second-best team in the A-League right now after reigning Champions Sydney FC by former Premier League winner Robbie Slater. Head coach Ufuk Talay was voted Coach of the Month, while Cameron Devlin was voted Player of the Month. Reno Piscopo was deemed as the December Nominee for the Young Footballer of the Year.

=== January ===
Wellington Phoenix won their first game of the year with a gritty 2–1 win over the Mariners followed by a 2–0 win over Wanderers thus matching their best ever unbeaten run. Wellington Phoenix's 9-game unbeaten run came to end with a shock loss to Brisbane Roar. Wellington Phoenix won their last game of the month with a 2–1 win over the Newcastle Jets accumulating 9 points from possible 12 cementing their fourth spot in the ladder. Following a run of strong consistent performances, Cameron Devlin was deemed as the January Nominee for Young Footballer of the Year.

=== February ===
Wellington Phoenix lost their first game of the month 4–2 to Perth Glory in an encouraging effort. Wellington Phoenix then went on to beat Melbourne City for a crucial 1–0 win at Eden Park in front of more than 15,000 fans followed by yet another dominating 2–0 victory over Western United the following week. The two wins saw Wellington Phoenix move up to 3rd place on the ladder accumulating 6 points from possible 9. David Ball was voted for Player of the Month for February following a string of consistent performances.

=== March & Effects of the 2019–20 Coronavirus Pandemic ===
Wellington Phoenix continued their strong form into March with a dominant 3–1 over the Central Coast Mariners and a strong 3–0 win over Melbourne Victory. This run of 4 consecutive wins saw Wellington Phoenix match their best ever run of consecutive wins. Due to the required self isolation required after overseas travel imposed by the Australian Government imposed on 16 March 2020, Wellington Phoenix were required to self-isolate when arriving in Australia due to playing in Wellington on 15 March 2020. Due to the postponement of games involving Wellington Phoenix, the FFA announced that games would be rescheduled in order to complete the season in a condensed period. On 16 March 2020, the FFA announced that the remainder of the season would proceed with all games being played behind closed doors. Wellington Phoenix intended to relocate for the remainder of the season in Sydney in order to keep playing the remainder of its scheduled games. On 24 March 2020, the FFA announced that the season would be postponed until further notice due to the COVID-19 pandemic in Australia and New Zealand. With the suspension of the league announced, the club returned to Wellington on 24 March 2020. An assessment will be made by the FFA on 22 April 2020.

== Players ==
Note: Flags indicate national team as defined under FIFA eligibility rules; some limited exceptions apply. Players may hold more than one non-FIFA nationality.

No.	Pos.	Nation	Player
1	GK	NZL	Stefan Marinovic
2	DF	AUS	Liam McGing
3	DF	AUS	Luke DeVere
4	DF	NZL	Te Atawhai Hudson-Wihongi
5	MF	GER	Matti Steinmann
6	MF	NZL	Tim Payne
7	FW	AUS	Reno Piscopo
8	MF	AUS	Cameron Devlin
9	FW	ENG	David Ball
10	MF	MEX	Ulises Dávila
11	MF	AUS	Jaushua Sotirio

No.	Pos.	Nation	Player
12	MF	AUS	Brandon Wilson
13	DF	NZL	Liberato Cacace
14	MF	NZL	Alex Rufer (vice-captain)
16	DF	NZL	Louis Fenton
17	MF	NZL	Callan Elliot
20	GK	NZL	Oliver Sail
21	FW	NZL	Callum McCowatt
23	DF	AUS	Walter Scott
27	DF	ENG	Steven Taylor (captain)
31	FW	NZL	Ben Waine
88	FW	ENG	Gary Hooper

== Transfers ==
=== From youth squad ===
N	Pos.	Nat.	Name	Age	Notes
31	FW	(New Zealand)	Ben Waine	18	Originally a 1-year scholarship contract, followed by 1-year senior contract, but was upgraded to a 2-year senior contract.

=== Transfers in ===
No.	Position	Player	Transferred from	Type/fee	Contract length	Date	Ref
1	GK	Stefan Marinovic	Unattached	Free transfer	2 years	6 June 2019	
23	DF	(Australia) Walter Scott	Perth Glory	Free transfer	1 year	7 June 2019	
11	MF	(Australia) Jaushua Sotirio	Western Sydney Wanderers	Free transfer	1 year	12 June 2019	
3	DF	(Australia) Luke DeVere	Unattached	Free transfer	1 year	17 June 2019	
21	FW	Callum McCowatt	(New Zealand) Eastern Suburbs	Free transfer	1 year	26 June 2019	
8	MF	(Australia) Cameron Devlin	Sydney FC	Free transfer	2 years	4 July 2019	
10	MF	(Mexico) Ulises Dávila	Unattached	Free transfer	2 years	5 July 2019	
2	DF	(Australia) Liam McGing	(Australia) Sutherland Sharks	Free transfer	1 year	9 July 2019	
9	FW	(England) David Ball	(England) Rotherham United	Free transfer	2 years	12 July 2019	
4	MF	Te Atawhai Hudson-Wihongi	(New Zealand) Auckland City	Free transfer	1 year	18 July 2019	
6	MF	Tim Payne	(New Zealand) Eastern Suburbs	Free transfer	1 year	19 July 2019	
5	MF	(Germany) Matti Steinmann	Unattached	Free transfer	1 year	9 August 2019	
7	FW	(Australia) Reno Piscopo	(Italy) Renate	$145,000	3 years	18 August 2019	
88	FW	(England) Gary Hooper	Unattached	Undisclosed	1 year	17 October 2019	
12	MF	(Australia) Brandon Wilson	Unattached	Free transfer	1.5 years	6 January 2020	

=== Transfers out ===
No.	Position	Player	Transferred to	Type/fee	Date	Ref
4	MF	(Spain) Mandi	Unattached	End of contract	13 May 2019	
12	DF	(Australia) Antony Golec	Unattached	End of contract	13 May 2019	
1	GK	(Poland) Filip Kurto	Western United	Free transfer	14 May 2019	
23	MF	(Australia) Max Burgess	Western United	Free transfer	16 May 2019	
3	DF	Justin Gulley	Unattached	Free transfer	20 May 2019	
5	DF	(Australia) Ryan Lowry	Unattached	End of contract	20 May 2019	
7	FW	(Republic of Ireland) Cillian Sheridan	Unattached	Free transfer	20 May 2019	
9	FW	(Australia) Nathan Burns	Unattached	Mutual contract termination	20 May 2019	
15	MF	(Poland) Michał Kopczyński	(Poland) Legia Warsaw	Loan return	20 May 2019	
21	FW	(Fiji) Roy Krishna	Unattached	End of contact	27 May 2019	
11	FW	(Australia) David Williams	Unattached	Free transfer	10 June 2019	
22	DF	Andrew Durante	Unattached	Free transfer	11 June 2019	
19	DF	Tom Doyle	Unattached	Free transfer	17 June 2019	
32	MF	Gianni Stensness	Unattached	Free transfer	21 June 2019	
18	MF	Sarpreet Singh	(Germany) Bayern Munich II	$750,000–$1,000,000	1 July 2019	

=== Contract extensions ===
No.	Name	Position	Duration	Date	Notes
14	Alex Rufer	Midfielder	3 years	1 January 2020	
27	(England) Steven Taylor	Defender	2 years	1 January 2020	
11	(Australia) Jaushua Sotirio	Attacker	2 years	2 January 2020	
6	Tim Payne	Defender	2 years	3 January 2020	

== Technical staff ==
Position	Name
Head coach	(Australia) Ufuk Talay
Assistant coach	(England) Chris Greenacre
Assistant coach/Head analyst	(Australia) Giancarlo Italiano
Goalkeeping coach	(England) Paul Gothard
Head physiotherapist	(Scotland) Ben Venn
Strength & conditioning coach	(New Zealand) Aidan Wivell

== Friendlies ==
24 July 2019	Wairarapa United (New Zealand)	0–7	(New Zealand) Wellington Phoenix	Masterton, New Zealand
17:30 NZST		Report	Sotirio 14', 60'; Dávila 23'; Devlin 34'; Ball 40', 44'; Cacace 59'	Stadium: Trust House Memorial Park

31 July 2019	Western Suburbs (New Zealand)	0–2	(New Zealand) Wellington Phoenix	Porirua, New Zealand
NZST		Report	McCowatt; Waine	Stadium: Endeavour Park

25 August 2019	Miramar Rangers and Wellington Olympic Select XI (New Zealand)	2–6	(New Zealand) Wellington Phoenix	Wellington, New Zealand
14:30 NZDT	Othman 66'; Stevens 73'	Report	Sutton 2', 66'; Waine 16', 63', 89'; McCowatt 81' (pen.)	Stadium: David Farrington Park

1 September 2019	Central League Select XI (New Zealand)	0–3	(New Zealand) Wellington Phoenix	Raumati Beach, New Zealand
14:00 NZDT		Report	Waine 32', 43'; Rufer 37'	Stadium: Weka Park

7 September 2019	Wollongong Wolves (Australia)	0–4	(New Zealand) Wellington Phoenix	Sydney, Australia
		Report	Waine (?); Ball (?)	Attendance: 0 (behind closed doors)

11 September 2019	Western Sydney Wanderers (Australia)	1–1	(New Zealand) Wellington Phoenix	Sydney, Australia
	Baccus 80'	Report	Sotirio 56'	Stadium: Blacktown International Sportspark; Attendance: 0 (behind closed doors)

15 September 2019	Sydney FC (Australia)	0–0	(New Zealand) Wellington Phoenix	Sydney, Australia
		Report		Attendance: 0 (behind closed doors)

29 September 2019	Melbourne Victory (Australia)	1–1	(New Zealand) Wellington Phoenix	Melbourne, Australia
	Goal	Report	Piscopo	Attendance: 0 (behind closed doors)

6 October 2019	Wellington Phoenix (New Zealand)	2–0	(New Zealand) Team Wellington	Wellington, New Zealand
14:00 NZST	Dávila 16'; McCowatt 56'	Report		Stadium: Westpac Stadium

12 July 2020	Western Sydney Wanderers (Australia)	0–3	(New Zealand) Wellington Phoenix
		Report	Sotirio; Steinmann; DeVere

== Competitions ==
Win Draw Loss

=== Overview ===
Competition	First match	Last match	Starting round	Final position	Record							
Competition	First match	Last match	Starting round	Final position	Pld	W	D	L	GF	GA	GD	Win %
A-League	13 October 2019	13 August 2020	Matchday 1	3rd	26	12	5	9	38	33	+5	46.15
A-League Finals	22 August 2020		Elimination-finals	Elimination-finals	1	0	0	1	0	1	−1	0.00
FFA Cup	7 August 2019		Round of 32	Round of 32	1	0	1	0	2	2	+0	0.00
Total					28	12	6	10	40	36	+4	42.86

Source: Soccerway

=== FFA Cup ===
7 August Round of 32	Brisbane Strikers (Queensland)	2–2 (a.e.t.) (4–2 p)	(New Zealand) Wellington Phoenix	Brisbane
19:30	Omori 25'; Pengelly 54'	Report	Devlin 58'; McCowatt 71'	Stadium: Perry Park; Attendance: 1,612; Referee: Alex King
	Penalties
	Pengelly (penalty scored); Omori (penalty scored); Maltby (penalty scored); Hills (penalty scored)		Cacace (penalty scored); Ball (penalty missed); McCowatt (penalty missed); Rufer (penalty scored)

=== A-League ===
==== League table ====
Pos	Team	Pld	W	D	L	GF	GA	GD	Pts	Qualification
1	Sydney FC (C)	26	16	5	5	49	25	+24	53	Qualification for 2021 AFC Champions League group stage and Finals series (Note: All Australian teams withdrew from the 2021 AFC Champions League on 4 June 2021.) (Note: The top two teams enter the Finals series at the semi-finals, while the teams ranked third to sixth enter the Finals series at the elimination-finals.)
2	Melbourne City	26	14	5	7	49	37	+12	47	Qualification for 2021 AFC Champions League qualifying play-offs and Finals series
3	Wellington Phoenix (Note: Wellington Phoenix cannot qualify for the 2021 AFC Champions League as they are not recognised as an AFC club.)	26	12	5	9	38	33	+5	41	Qualification for Finals series
4	Brisbane Roar	26	11	7	8	29	28	+1	40	Qualification for 2021 AFC Champions League qualifying play-offs and Finals series
5	Western United	26	12	3	11	46	37	+9	39	Qualification for Finals series
6	Perth Glory	26	10	7	9	43	36	+7	37	Qualification for Finals series
7	Adelaide United	26	11	3	12	44	49	−5	36	
8	Newcastle Jets	26	9	7	10	32	40	−8	34	
9	Western Sydney Wanderers	26	9	6	11	35	40	−5	33	
10	Melbourne Victory	26	6	5	15	33	44	−11	23	
11	Central Coast Mariners	26	5	3	18	26	55	−29	18	

Source: A-Leagues
Rules for classification: 1) points; 2) goal difference; 3) number of goals scored.
(C) Champions

==== Results summary ====
Overall								Home						Away					
Pld	W	D	L	GF	GA	GD	Pts	W	D	L	GF	GA	GD	W	D	L	GF	GA	GD
26	12	5	9	38	33	+5	41	8	3	2	21	11	+10	4	2	7	17	22	−5

Source: ultimatealeague.com

==== Result by round ====
Round	1	2	3	4	5	6	7	8	9	10	11	12	13	14	15	16	17	18	19	20	21	22	23	24	25	26	27	28	29
Ground	H	A	H	A	A	B	H	A	H	A	H	A	H	H	A	H	B	A	H	H	A	A	H	A	B	H	A	H	A
Result	L	L	L	L	D	B	W	W	W	D	D	W	W	W	L	W	B	L	W	W	L	W	W	L	B	D	W	D	L
Position	11	11	11	11	11	11	11	9	5	6	6	6	4	4	4	4	4	4	4	4	4	3	3	–	–	–	–	–	3

Updated to match(es) played on 28 December 2019. Source: ultimatealeague.com
A = Away; H = Home; W = Win; D = Draw; L = Loss

==== Matches ====
Win Draw Loss

13 October 2019 1	Wellington Phoenix	0–1	Western United	Wellington
18:00 NZDT		Report	Berisha 34'	Stadium: Westpac Stadium; Attendance: 8,254; Referee: Kurt Ams

20 October 2019 2	Sydney FC	2–1	Wellington Phoenix	Sydney
18:00 AEDT	O'Neill 17'; Grant 77'	Report	Dávila 69'	Stadium: Leichhardt Oval; Attendance: 12,538; Referee: Jonathan Barreiro

27 October 2019 3	Wellington Phoenix	1–2	Perth Glory	Wellington
18:00 NZDT	Dávila 90+5' (pen.)	Report	Fornaroli 11'; Ikonomidis 33'	Stadium: Westpac Stadium; Attendance: 6,054; Referee: Alex King

3 November 2019 4	Melbourne City	3–2	Wellington Phoenix	Melbourne
16:00 AEDT	Metcalfe 30'; Galloway 34'; Noone 63' (pen.)	Report	Hooper 24'; Waine 90+3'	Stadium: AAMI Park; Attendance: 6,440; Referee: Ben Abraham

10 November 2019 5	Melbourne Victory	1–1	Wellington Phoenix	Melbourne
16:00 AEST	Toivonen 66'	Report	Dávila 5' (pen.)	Stadium: AAMI Park; Attendance: 15,014; Referee: Adam Kersey

23 November 2019 7	Wellington Phoenix	2–1	Brisbane Roar	Wellington
19:15 NZDT	Taylor 10'; Dávila 49'	Report	Mauk 85'	Stadium: Westpac Stadium; Attendance: 6,790; Referee: Adam Kersey

1 December 2019 8	Adelaide United	1–2	Wellington Phoenix	Adelaide
17:30 ACDT	Mileusnic 57'	Report	Dávila 71' (pen.); Ball 67'	Stadium: Coopers Stadium; Attendance: 6,207; Referee: Adam Fielding

7 December 2019 9	Wellington Phoenix	2–1	Western Sydney Wanderers	Auckland
19:15 NZDT	Sotirio 48'; Dávila 89' (pen.)	Report	Müller 64'	Stadium: Eden Park; Attendance: 8,851; Referee: Daniel Elder

14 December 2019 10	Melbourne Victory	0–0	Wellington Phoenix	Melbourne
17:15 AEST		Report		Stadium: AAMI Park; Attendance: 12,023; Referee: Stephen Lucas

21 December 2019 11	Wellington Phoenix	2–2	Sydney FC	Wellington
19:15 NZDT	Piscopo 37'; Dávila 25'	Report	Taylor 56' (o.g.); Le Fondre 14'	Stadium: Westpac Stadium; Attendance: 8,855; Referee: Chris Beath

28 December 2019 12	Western United	1–3	Wellington Phoenix	Ballarat
17:15 NZDT	Diamanti 89' (pen.)	Report	Ball 41'; McCowatt 55'; Dávila 80'	Stadium: Mars Stadium; Attendance: 5,084; Referee: Shaun Evans

4 January 2020 13	Wellington Phoenix	2–1	Central Coast Mariners	Wellington
19:15 NZDT	Hooper 13'; Ball 29'	Report	DeVere 45+1' (o.g.)	Stadium: Sky Stadium; Attendance: 8,201; Referee: Jonathan Barreiro

11 January 2020 14	Wellington Phoenix	2–0	Western Sydney Wanderers	Wellington
16:45 NZDT	Davila 15'; Cacace 88'	Report		Stadium: Sky Stadium; Attendance: 9,166; Referee: Adam Kersey

18 January 2020 15	Brisbane Roar	1–0	Wellington Phoenix	Brisbane
16:15 AEST	Wenzel-Halls 69'	Report		Stadium: Suncorp Stadium; Attendance: 9,987; Referee: Alex King

24 January 2020 16	Wellington Phoenix	2–1	Newcastle Jets	Wellington
19:15 NZDT	Sotirio 53'; Dávila 69'	Report	Arroyo 66'	Stadium: Sky Stadium; Attendance: 8,503; Referee: Ben Abraham

7 February 2020 18	Perth Glory	4–2	Wellington Phoenix	Perth
18:45 AWST	Mrcela 43'; D'Agostino 45+1', 54'; Fornaroli 90'	Report	Hooper 68', 76'	Stadium: HBF Park; Attendance: 7,248; Referee: Adam Kersey

15 February 2020 19	Wellington Phoenix	1–0	Melbourne City	Auckland
19:15 NZDT	Ball 58'	Report		Stadium: Eden Park; Attendance: 15,347; Referee: Alex King

21 February 2020 20	Wellington Phoenix	2–0	Western United	Wellington
19:15 NZDT	Cacace 29'; Ball 90'	Report		Stadium: Sky Stadium; Attendance: 7,281; Referee: Shaun Evans

8 March 2020 22	Central Coast Mariners	1–3	Wellington Phoenix	Gosford
16:00 AEDT	Jair 89'	Report	Cacace 18'; Hooper 30'; Sotirio 78'	Stadium: Central Coast Stadium; Attendance: 3,773; Referee: Adam Kersey

15 March 2020 23	Wellington Phoenix	3–0	Melbourne Victory	Wellington
18:00 NZDT	Dávila 3'; Hooper 21'; Ball 55'	Report		Stadium: Sky Stadium; Attendance: 7,519; Referee: Alex King

17 July 2020 21	Sydney FC	3–1	Wellington Phoenix	Sydney
19:30 AEDT	Le Fondre 76' (pen.); Buhagiar 88', 90'	Report	Piscopo 66' (pen.)	Stadium: Netstrata Jubilee Stadium; Attendance: 1,796; Referee: Chris Beath

22 July 2020 27	Perth Glory	1–2	Wellington Phoenix	Sydney
19:30 AEDT	Ingham 62'	Report	Hooper 32'; Davila 48' (pen.)	Stadium: Bankwest Stadium; Attendance: 0 Referee: Alex King

25 July 2020 26	Wellington Phoenix	1–1	Adelaide United	Sydney
17:00 AEDT	Sotirio 65'	Report	Opseth 60'	Stadium: Bankwest Stadium; Attendance: 0 Referee: Kurt Ams

31 July 2020 29	Western Sydney Wanderers	1–0	Wellington Phoenix	Sydney
19:30 AEDT	Yeboah 73'	Report		Stadium: Bankwest Stadium; Attendance: 2,194; Referee: Kurt Ams

5 August 2020 28	Wellington Phoenix	1–1	Brisbane Roar	Newcastle
18:00 AEDT	Hooper 82'	Report	McDonald 61'	Stadium: McDonald Jones Stadium; Attendance: 0 Referee: Alex King

13 August 2020 24	Newcastle Jets	3–0	Wellington Phoenix	Sydney
19:30 AEDT	Fitzgerald 45'; Ibini 76'; Hoffman 79'	Report		Stadium: Netstrata Jubilee Stadium; Attendance: 0 Referee: Alireza Faghani

==== Finals series ====
22 August 2020 Elimination-final	Wellington Phoenix	0–1	Perth Glory	Sydney
17:00 AEDT		Report	Chianese 18'	Stadium: Bankwest Stadium; Attendance: 0 Referee: Alex King

== Statistics ==
=== Appearances and goals ===
Includes all competitions. Players with no appearances not included in the list.

No.	Pos	Nat	Player	Total		A-League		A-League Finals		FFA Cup	
No.	Pos	Nat	Player	Apps	Goals	Apps	Goals	Apps	Goals	Apps	Goals
1	GK	(New Zealand) NZL	Stefan Marinovic	28	0	26	0	1	0	1	0
2	DF	(Australia) AUS	Liam McGing	4	0	0+3	0	0	0	1	0
3	DF	(Australia) AUS	Luke DeVere	25	0	24	0	0	0	1	0
4	DF	(New Zealand) NZL	Te Atawhai Hudson-Wihongi	12	0	3+7	0	1	0	1	0
5	MF	(Germany) GER	Matti Steinmann	24	0	23	0	1	0	0	0
6	DF	(New Zealand) NZL	Tim Payne	17	0	15+1	0	0	0	1	0
7	FW	(Australia) AUS	Reno Piscopo	21	2	16+4	2	1	0	0	0
8	MF	(Australia) AUS	Cameron Devlin	22	1	16+4	0	1	0	1	1
9	FW	(England) ENG	David Ball	26	6	23+1	6	1	0	1	0
10	MF	(Mexico) MEX	Ulises Dávila	27	12	23+3	12	1	0	0	0
11	FW	(Australia) AUS	Jaushua Sotirio	25	4	14+10	4	1	0	0	0
12	MF	(Australia) AUS	Brandon Wilson	4	0	2+2	0	0	0	0	0
13	DF	(New Zealand) NZL	Liberato Cacace	26	3	24	3	1	0	1	0
14	MF	(New Zealand) NZL	Alex Rufer	21	0	11+8	0	0+1	0	1	0
16	DF	(New Zealand) NZL	Louis Fenton	8	0	7+1	0	0	0	0	0
17	DF	(New Zealand) NZL	Callan Elliot	6	0	3+1	0	1	0	0+1	0
21	MF	(New Zealand) NZL	Callum McCowatt	26	2	13+11	1	0+1	0	1	1
23	DF	(Australia) AUS	Walter Scott	4	0	2+1	0	0	0	0+1	0
27	DF	(England) ENG	Steven Taylor	27	1	26	1	1	0	0	0
31	FW	(New Zealand) NZL	Ben Waine	16	1	1+14	1	0	0	1	0
32	DF	(New Zealand) NZL	Sam Sutton	4	0	1+3	0	0	0	0	0
88	FW	(England) ENG	Gary Hooper	21	8	13+8	8	0	0	0	0

- Source: Soccerway

=== Disciplinary record ===
Includes all competitions. The list is sorted by squad number when total cards are equal. Players with no cards not included in the list.

No.	Pos	Nat	Player	Total			A-League			A-League Finals			FFA Cup		
No.	Pos	Nat	Player	Yellow card	Second yellow card	Red card	Yellow card	Second yellow card	Red card	Yellow card	Second yellow card	Red card	Yellow card	Second yellow card	Red card
13	DF	(New Zealand) NZL	Liberato Cacace	5	0	1	4	0	1	0	0	0	1	0	0
3	DF	(Australia) AUS	Luke DeVere	3	1	0	3	1	0	0	0	0	0	0	0
6	DF	(New Zealand) NZL	Tim Payne	2	1	0	2	1	0	0	0	0	0	0	0
5	MF	(Germany) GER	Matti Steinmann	9	0	0	9	0	0	0	0	0	0	0	0
8	MF	(Australia) AUS	Cameron Devlin	8	0	0	6	0	0	1	0	0	1	0	0
7	FW	(Australia) AUS	Reno Piscopo	4	0	0	4	0	0	0	0	0	0	0	0
11	FW	(Australia) AUS	Jaushua Sotirio	4	0	0	4	0	0	0	0	0	0	0	0
14	MF	(New Zealand) NZL	Alex Rufer	4	0	0	4	0	0	0	0	0	0	0	0
27	DF	(England) ENG	Steven Taylor	4	0	0	4	0	0	0	0	0	0	0	0
9	FW	(England) ENG	David Ball	3	0	0	3	0	0	0	0	0	0	0	0
1	GK	(New Zealand) NZL	Stefan Marinovic	2	0	0	2	0	0	0	0	0	0	0	0
10	MF	(Mexico) MEX	Ulises Dávila	2	0	0	2	0	0	0	0	0	0	0	0
16	DF	(New Zealand) NZL	Louis Fenton	2	0	0	2	0	0	0	0	0	0	0	0
17	DF	(New Zealand) NZL	Callan Elliot	1	0	0	0	0	0	0	0	0	1	0	0
88	FW	(England) ENG	Gary Hooper	1	0	0	1	0	0	0	0	0	0	0	0

- Source: Soccerway
- (yellow card) = Number of bookings; (second yellow card) = Number of sending offs after a second yellow card; (red card) = Number of sending offs by a direct red card.
