= Ben Litfin =

Australian soccer player

Personal information
- Full name: Benjamin Litfin
- Date of birth: 25 March 1995 (age 31)
- Place of birth: Gold Coast, Australia
- Height: 1.74 m (5 ft 9 in)
- Position: Attacking midfielder

Youth career
- 2012–2015: Brisbane Roar

Senior career*
Years	Team	Apps	(Gls)
2013–2015	Brisbane Roar	0	(0)
2014–2015	Brisbane Roar NPL	17	(1)
2015–2016	Gold Coast City	24	(19)
2016–2017	Wellington Phoenix	2	(0)
2016–2017	Wellington Phoenix Reserves	5	(0)
2017	Bentleigh Greens	29	(3)
2018–2020	Altona Magic	32	(7)
2021	Port Melbourne	7	(1)
2022–	Musgrave SC	5	(1)
- * Club domestic league appearances and goals as of 27 September 2022

Ben Litfin (born 25 March 1995) is an Australian footballer who last played for Port Melbourne Shark in the NPL Victoria.

== Club career ==
=== Gold Coast City ===
In the 2016 season, he was temporarily the chief penalty-taker for Gold Coast City, helping him win the golden boot after he scored 19 goals in 20 matches. He also won the Total Compression NPL Player of the month award in May and the Total Compression NPL player of the year award.

=== Wellington Phoenix ===
In October 2016, Litfin returned to the A-League when he signed a one-year contract with Wellington Phoenix. Three months after joining Litfin left Wellington Phoenix by mutual consent.

=== Bentleigh Greens ===
To start the 2017 season, Ben Litfin made his debut for Bentleigh Greens in a 2–1 FFV Community Shield win over South Melbourne. According to Bentleigh Greens coach John Anastasiadis, he is able to cause difficulties for the opposition deep within their box, befitting the number 10 role.

Inspired Bentleigh Greens to come back 4–4 to draw Pascoe Vale FC with a goal and assist.

=== Other ===
Litfin was affirmed as NPL Queensland U-23 Select Team captain in their match versus Brisbane Roar U23.

== Honours ==
- NPL Victoria Team of the Week 2017: Round 2
- NPL Player of the Month
- NPL Player of the Year
- 2013–14 A-League winners medal
