= Kate Taylor (footballer) =

New Zealand footballer

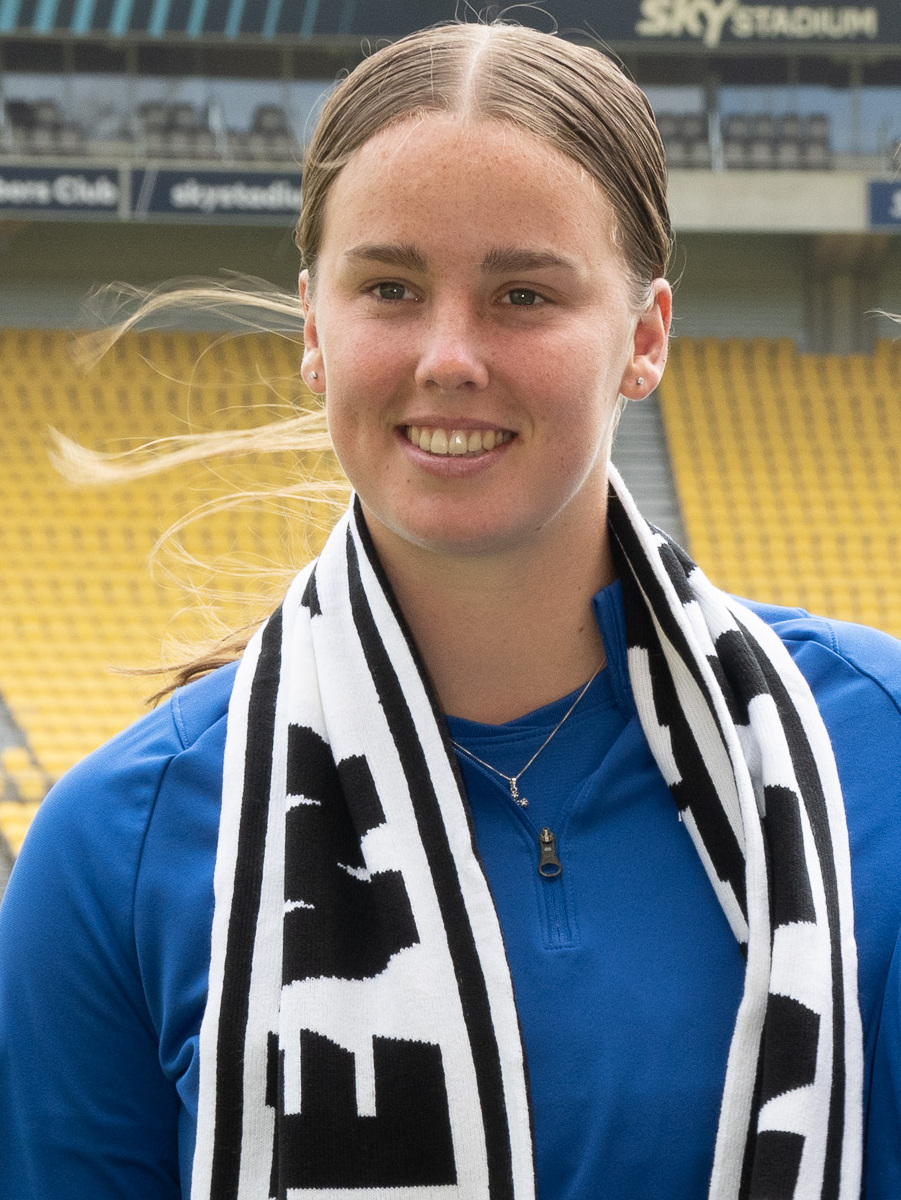
- Taylor in November 2022

Personal information
- Full name: Kate Maria Taylor
- Date of birth: 21 October 2003 (age 23)
- Place of birth: Christchurch, New Zealand
- Height: 1.78 m (5 ft 10 in)
- Position: Defender

Team information
- Current team: Madrid CFF

Youth career
- Nomads United
- Cashmere Technical
- –2018: Canterbury United Pride

Senior career*
Years	Team	Apps	(Gls)
- Cashmere Technical
2018–2021	Canterbury United Pride		
2021–2024	Wellington Phoenix	42	(4)
2024–2026	Dijon	37	(1)
2026–	Madrid CFF	0	(0)

International career^{‡}
2019	New Zealand U17	2	(0)
2022	New Zealand U20	7	(1)
2022–	New Zealand	32	(3)
- * Club domestic league appearances and goals as of 23 May 2026. ‡ National team caps and goals as of 23 May 2026.

Kate Maria Taylor (born 21 October 2003) is a New Zealand professional footballer who plays as a defender for Liga F club Madrid CFF and the New Zealand national team. She has also represented New Zealand at youth level.

== Personal life ==
Taylor studied a Bachelor of Health Science, majoring in Integrated Human Health at Massey University.

== Club career ==
=== Youth career ===
Taylor started playing her youth football for Nomads United. At the age of 13 she was brought into the youth set up at Canterbury United Pride before making her debut in the 2018 Women's National League.

=== Canterbury United Pride ===
During her three seasons at Canterbury United Pride, Taylor won three consecutive titles. During the winter she also played for Cashmere Technical.

=== Wellington Phoenix ===
Taylor signed for the Wellington Phoenix on 19 October 2021 for the club's inaugural season in the 2021–22 A-League Women. She was named vice-captain at just 18 years of age.

Taylor extended her contract on 26 July 2022 for another season. She was the vice-captain for the 2022–23 season too.

On 1 August 2023, Taylor signed on for the 2023–24 season. During the 2023–24 season she developed into a defensive-midfielder where she had played at times during the previous season as well as the national team.

In June 2024, Taylor left Wellington Phoenix to explore other opportunities overseas.

=== Dijon ===
In July 2024, Taylor signed a two-year contract with French club Dijon.

=== Madrid CFF ===
On 29 July 2026, Taylor signed with Madrid CFF for the 2026–27 season.

== International career ==
Taylor was captain of the New Zealand U20 side at the 2022 FIFA U-20 Women's World Cup in Costa Rica.

Taylor received her first call-up in June 2022 for international friendlies against Norway and Wales. Taylor made her debut for the New Zealand women's national football team on 25 June 2022 in a friendly against Norway, replacing Rebekah Stott at half time. Taylor was named as a reserve player for the 2023 FIFA Women's World Cup in New Zealand.

Taylor scored her first goal for New Zealand at the 2024 OFC Women's Olympic Qualifying Tournament against Samoa and was also awarded player of the match.

On 4 July 2024, Taylor was called up to the New Zealand squad for the 2024 Summer Olympics.

== Career statistics ==
=== Club ===
As of match played on 6 May 2026.

Appearances and goals by club, season and competition
Club	Season	League			Cup		Others		Total	
Club	Season	Division	Apps	Goals	Apps	Goals	Apps	Goals	Apps	Goals
Wellington Phoenix	2021–22	A-League Women	13	1	—		—		13	1
Wellington Phoenix	2022–23	A-League Women	12	1	—		—		12	1
Wellington Phoenix	2023–24	A-League Women	17	2	—		—		17	2
Wellington Phoenix	Total		42	4	—		—		42	4
Dijon	2024–25	Première Ligue	20	1	3	1	—		23	2
Dijon	2025–26	Première Ligue	17	0	1	0	1	0	19	0
Dijon	Total		37	1	4	1	1	0	42	2
Madrid CFF	2026–27	Liga F	0	0	0	0	—		0	0
Career total			79	5	4	1	1	0	84	6

=== International ===
As of match played on 10 February 2023.

Appearances and goals by national team and year
National team	Year	Apps	Goals
New Zealand	2022	6	0
New Zealand	2023	5	0
New Zealand	2024	2	1
Total		13	1

=== International goals ===
No.	Date	Venue	Opponent	Score	Result	Competition
1.	10 February 2024	FFS Football Stadium, Apia, Samoa	Samoa	2–0	6–0	2024 OFC Women's Olympic Qualifying Tournament
2.	31 July 2024	Parc Olympique Lyonnais, Lyon, France	France	1–1	1–2	2024 Summer Olympics
3.	11 April 2026	FMG Stadium Waikato, Hamilton, New Zealand	Fiji	2–0	5–0	2027 FIFA Women's World Cup qualification

== Honours ==
Canterbury United Pride

- National Women's League: 2018, 2019, 2020

Individual

- Mainland Football Women's Youth of the Year: 2020
- Wellington Phoenix Player of the Year: 2021–22
