= Hiroki Omori =

Japanese footballer (born 1990)

Personal information
- Full name: Hiroki Omori
- Date of birth: 26 July 1990 (age 36)
- Place of birth: Ishinomaki, Miyagi, Japan
- Height: 1.71 m (5 ft 7 1/2 in)
- Position: Defender

Youth career
- 2006–2008: Shiogama NTFC Wiese
- 2009–2012: Kanto Gakuin University

Senior career*
Years	Team	Apps	(Gls)
2013	Blaublitz Akita	21	(1)
2014–2015	SC Sagamihara	42	(2)
2016–2019	Brisbane Strikers	92	(13)
- * Club domestic league appearances and goals as of 8 March 2020

Hiroki Omori (大森 啓生, Ōmori Hiroki; born 26 July 1990) is a Japanese football player. He last played defender for the Brisbane Strikers in the National Premier Leagues Queensland.

== Career ==
=== Early career in Japan ===
After playing with Shiogama NTFC Wiese's youth team, Omori enrolled as a student at Kanto Gakuin University. In his third year, he was selected to be a representative at Kanto University qualifying tournaments of the Denso Cup.

In 2013, he joined Japan Football League side Blaublitz Akita leaving one year later for SC Sagamihara in the newly formed J3 League. He played for the club for 2 years before choosing to leave the side at the end of 2015.

=== Brisbane Strikers ===
On 24 August 2016, Omori scored from a free-kick in the 34th minute against A-League side Melbourne City in an FFA Cup match to start the scoring. Due to his notable performances, he was given a trial with A-League side, Brisbane Roar.
