= Grace Wisnewski =

New Zealand association footballer (born 2002)

Personal information
- Full name: Grace Cecilia Wisnewski
- Date of birth: 28 June 2002 (age 24)
- Place of birth: New Zealand
- Height: 1.64 m (5 ft 4 1/2 in)
- Position: Central midfielder

Youth career
- Hamilton Wanderers

Senior career*
Years	Team	Apps	(Gls)
2021–2024	Wellington Phoenix	28	(2)
2024–2025	Lexington SC	13	(1)
2025–	Nordsjælland	17	(1)

International career^{‡}
2017–2018	New Zealand U17	10	(9)
2019–2020	New Zealand U20	3	(0)
2023–	New Zealand	7	(0)
Medal record
FIFA U-17 Women's World Cup
Bronze medal – third place	2018 Uruguay
OFC U-19 Women's Championship
Gold medal – first place	2019 Cook Islands
- * Club domestic league appearances and goals as of 23 May 2026. ‡ National team caps and goals as of 23 May 2026.

Grace Cecilia Wisnewski (born 28 June 2002) is a New Zealand professional footballer who plays as a central midfielder for A-Liga club FC Nordsjælland and the New Zealand national team.

== Club career ==
=== Wellington Phoenix ===
In October 2021, Wisnewski joined Wellington Phoenix in A-League Women from Hamilton Wanderers. Growing up a club fan, she joined their first women's team. She played every minute of all of the eleven games she played in the team's first season; she cut her season short to return to New Zealand when it lifted COVID-19 pandemic travel restrictions. She had struggled with her mental health and was contemplating quitting football. The break she took helped her be more excited about football, and six months later, she signed a new deal with the Phoenix in September 2022. She got a calf injury shortly afterward, keeping her from playing for some time. Back by April 2023, Wisnewski scored the latest-minute goal in regulation time in A-League history with what A-League statistician Andrew Howe called an "acrobatic equalizer" in the 99th minute of a match against defending league champions Melbourne Victory, providing a 2–2 draw for the last-placed Phoenix.

=== Lexington SC ===
In June 2024, Wisnewski announced she was departing Wellington Phoenix to explore other opportunities. On June 17, Wisnewski was announced as the first ever USL Super League signing for Lexington SC for the league's inaugural 2024-25 season. She made 13 appearances before leaving the club at the end of the season.

=== FC Nordsjaellland ===
After joining Danish side FC Nordsjaelland in the summer of 2025, she scored her first goal in the first qualifying round of the 2025–26 UEFA Women's Europa Cup in the second leg against Finish opponent KuPS, with Nordsjaelland winning the tie 8-2 on aggregate.

== International career ==
Wisnewski scored three goals as part of the New Zealand U-17 side that won the bronze medal at the 2018 Women's World Cup. At the under-19 level, she won the Golden Ball as player of the tournament at the 2019 OFC U-19 Women's Championship that New Zealand won. She was a member of the New Zealand U-20 side and took part with them in the 2022 World Cup.

Wisnewski made her senior début for the Football Ferns as a substitute in a 0–4 loss to the United States on 18 January 2023. A few days later, she came on again in the second half when they met again.

On 30 June 2023, Ava Collins, Meikayla Moore, and Kate Taylor were named as reserve players for the 2023 FIFA Women's World Cup. The following week, however, Moore declined to join the squad as a reserve player and Wisnewski was called up as a reserve player instead of her.

== Personal life ==
Grace has three brothers Logan, Kyle and Blake. Logan and Kyle play professional futsal, with Logan playing for the New Zealand national futsal team.
