= Milly Clegg =

New Zealand footballer (born 2005)

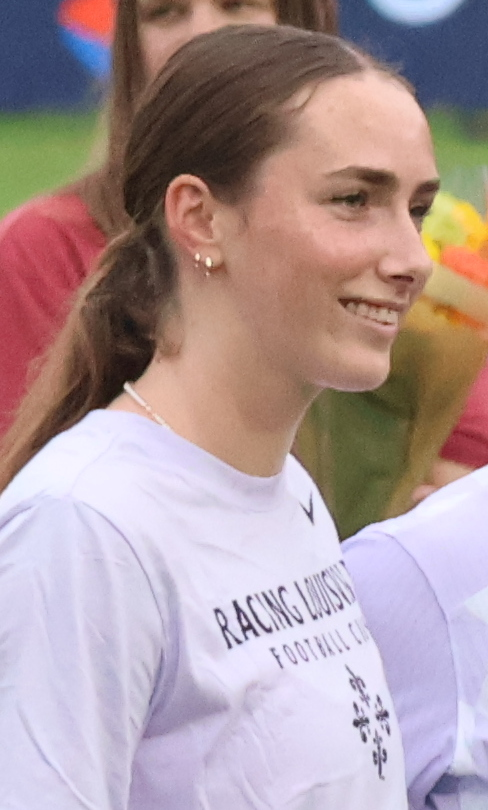
- Clegg with Racing Louisville in 2024

Personal information
- Full name: Emily Louise Foy Clegg
- Date of birth: 1 November 2005 (age 21)
- Place of birth: Auckland, New Zealand
- Height: 1.74 m (5 ft 9 in)
- Position: Forward

Team information
- Current team: Wellington Phoenix
- Number: 8

Youth career
- Ellerslie
- Bucklands Beach

Senior career*
Years	Team	Apps	(Gls)
–2022	Auckland United		
2022–2023	Wellington Phoenix	16	(4)
2023–2024	Western Sydney Wanderers	1	(0)
2024–2025	Racing Louisville	1	(0)
2025	→ Halifax Tides (loan)	20	(1)
2026	Vittsjö GIK	14	(0)
2026–	Wellington Phoenix	3	(1)

International career^{‡}
2022	New Zealand U17	3	(2)
2022	New Zealand U20	7	(2)
2023–	New Zealand	23	(4)
- * Club domestic league appearances and goals as of 16 November 2026. ‡ National team caps and goals as of 23 May 2026.

Emily Louise Foy Clegg (born 1 November 2005) is a New Zealand professional footballer who plays as a forward for A-League Women club Wellington Phoenix and New Zealand national team.

== Early life ==
Milly Clegg grew up in Auckland, and Olympic field hockey player Kylie Clegg (née Foy) is her mother. When young, Clegg played football for Ellerslie, Bucklands Beach AFC, and at Mount Albert Grammar School; she watched the 2019 FIFA Women's World Cup while a student there and was inspired.

Clegg joined Bucklands Beach AFC at the end of 2019 as a striker for a boys NRFL Youth League team, scoring the most goals for the team in 2020.

== Club career ==
=== Auckland United ===
Clegg played her first minutes of senior football with National League side Auckland United, helping them to win the Kate Sheppard Cup in 2022 before making her National League debut with them.

=== Wellington Phoenix ===
She then joined the Wellington Phoenix, the only New Zealand team in the Australian top-flight women's league, for the 2022–23 season. She was not paid while playing with the Phoenix, in order to retain amateur status and so maintain NCAA eligibility, considering playing college soccer in the United States in the future.

Becoming the Phoenix's top scorer with four goals, she was offered different options to continue with them, including a multi-year professional contract, but rejected the Phoenix to join their rivals, Australian side Western Sydney Wanderers FC. She has also declined to be paid by this club.

=== Racing Louisville ===
In January 2024, NWSL club Racing Louisville announced the signing of Clegg on a three-year contract.

In January 2025, Clegg was loaned to Canadian club Halifax Tides for the inaugural season of Canada's top tier Northern Super League. She scored her first goal for the Tides in a 1–1 draw against Vancouver Rise FC on 27 September 2025.

=== Vittsjö GIK ===
In January 2026, Clegg joined Damallsvenskan club Vittsjö GIK, signing a two-year contract.

=== Return to Wellington Phoenix ===
On 17 September 2026, the Wellington Phoenix of the A-League Women confirmed Clegg had returned to the club. The New Zealand club signed Clegg on to a 2-year contract until the end of the 2027–28 season.

== International career ==
As a youth international, Clegg represented New Zealand at the Under-17 and Under-20 World Cups. At the 2022 Under-20 Women's World Cup, she scored in the third minute of their 2–2 draw with Colombia, the last match as they exited in the group stage. At the 2022 Under-17 Women's World Cup later that year, she scored New Zealand's only goals in two 1–3 defeats.

With New Zealand looking for more goalscoring threats ahead of their home Women's World Cup, Clegg was called up and made her debut for the senior team on 7 April 2023 in a friendly against Iceland. On 30 June 2023, Clegg was called up to the New Zealand squad for the 2023 FIFA Women's World Cup, the youngest player in the team. The tournament is her third World Cup in under 12 months, a feat matched by Colombia's Linda Caicedo, leading Clegg to be described as "an absolute unicorn" by New Zealand sports podcast The Niche Cache.

On 4 July 2024, Clegg was called up to the New Zealand squad for the 2024 Summer Olympics.

== Career statistics ==
=== International ===
As of match played on 14 July 2023.

Appearances and goals by national team and year
National team	Year	Apps	Goals
New Zealand	2023	4	0
Total		4	0

=== International goals ===
No.	Date	Venue	Opponent	Score	Result	Competition
1.	3 June 2024	Estadio Nueva Condomina, Murcia, Spain	Japan	1–0	1–4	Friendly
2.	3 June 2025	Estadio Nuevo Mirador, Algeciras, Spain	Venezuela	1–1	2–1	Friendly
3.	2 March 2026	National Stadium, Honiara, Solomon Islands	Solomon Islands	1–0	8–0	2027 FIFA Women's World Cup qualification
4.	2 March 2026	National Stadium, Honiara, Solomon Islands	Solomon Islands	8–0	8–0	2027 FIFA Women's World Cup qualification

== Honours ==
Auckland United

- Kate Sheppard Cup: 2022
