= 2024–25 Wellington Phoenix FC (women) season =

4th season in existence of Wellington Phoenix (A-League Women)

Wellington Phoenix
2024–25 season
- Chairman: Robert Morrison
- Manager: Paul Temple
- Stadium: Jerry Collins Stadium
- A-League Women: 9th
- Top goalscorer: Olivia Fergusson (5)
- Highest home attendance: 1,015 vs. Melbourne Victory (8 February 2025)
- Lowest home attendance: 435 vs. Sydney FC (21 December 2024)
- Average home league attendance: 714
- Biggest win: 3–0 vs. Western Sydney Wanderers (9 January 2025)
- Biggest defeat: 4–2 vs. Western United (1 November 2024)
Home colours	Away colours
- All statistics correct as of end of season.

The 2024–25 season was the fourth in the history of Wellington Phoenix FC (women). The Phoenix competed in the A-League Women and finished ninth out of eleven.

== Players ==
=== First-team squad ===
Note: Flags indicate national team as defined under FIFA eligibility rules; some limited exceptions apply. Players may hold more than one non-FIFA nationality.

No.	Pos.	Nation	Player
2	DF	NZL	Zoe McMeeken
3	DF	LBN	Tiana Jaber
4	DF	NZL	Mackenzie Barry
5	DF	USA	Alivia Kelly
6	MF	USA	Maya McCutcheon
7	FW	NZL	Grace Jale
8	MF	NZL	Amelia Abbott
9	FW	ENG	Olivia Fergusson
10	MF	NZL	Alyssa Whinham
11	MF	NZL	Manaia Elliott
12	DF	NZL	Ella McMillan (scholarship)
13	GK	NZL	Brooke Neary (youth)

No.	Pos.	Nation	Player
14	MF	JPN	Mebae Tanaka
15	MF	NZL	Daisy Brazendale
16	MF	NZL	Annalie Longo (captain)
17	MF	NZL	Ela Jerez (scholarship)
18	FW	NZL	Ella McCann (scholarship)
19	MF	NZL	Olivia Ingham
20	FW	NZL	Emma Main
21	DF	NZL	Lara Wall (scholarship)
22	GK	NZL	Aimee Danieli
23	DF	NZL	Rebecca Lake
39	GK	POR	Carolina Vilão

== Transfers ==
=== Transfers in ===
No.	Position	Player	From	Type/fee	Contract length	Date	Ref
39	GK	(Portugal) Carolina Vilão	(Portugal) Benfica	Free transfer	1 year	10 July 2024	
9	FW	(England) Olivia Fergusson	(England) Wolverhampton Wanderers	Free transfer	1 year	9 August 2024	
7	FW	Grace Jale	Unattached	Free transfer	1 year	27 August 2024	
6	MF	(United States) Maya McCutcheon	(United States) North Carolina Courage	Free transfer	1 year	17 September 2024	
21	DF	Lara Wall	(New Zealand) Canterbury United Pride	Free transfer	2 years, first one of which is on scholarship terms	2 October 2024	
14	MF	(Japan) Mebae Tanaka	(Australia) Preston Lions	Free transfer	1 year	3 October 2024	
5	DF	(Algeria) Imane Chebel	(Brazil) Flamengo	Free transfer	1 year	7 November 2024	
5	DF	(United States) Alivia Kelly	(United States) NC State Wolfpack	Free transfer	1 year	21 November 2024	
8	MF	Amelia Abbott	(United States) Texas Longhorns	Free transfer	6 months	20 December 2024	

==== From academy squad ====
N	Pos.	Nat.	Name	Age	Notes
17	MF	(New Zealand)	Ela Jerez	16	two-year scholarship contract
18	FW	(New Zealand)	Ella McCann	19	two-year scholarship contract
12	DF	(New Zealand)	Ella McMillan	19	two-year scholarship contract
13	GK	(New Zealand)	Brooke Neary	17	one-year youth development agreement

=== Transfers out ===
No.	Position	Player	Transferred to	Type/fee	Date	Ref
8	FW	Grace Wisnewski	(United States) Lexington SC	End of contract	4 June 2024	
11	MF	(United States) Hope Breslin	(United States) Brooklyn FC	End of contract	4 June 2024	
18	DF	(United States) Hailey Davidson	(United States) Dallas Trinity	End of contract	4 June 2024	
3	DF	Kate Taylor	(France) Dijon	End of contract	10 June 2024	
9	FW	Kelli Brown	Unattached	End of contract	10 June 2024	
13	DF	Michaela Foster	(New Zealand) Auckland United	End of contract	21 June 2024	
17	FW	(Venezuela) Mariana Speckmaier	Melbourne City	End of contract	3 July 2024	
1	GK	(Canada) Rylee Foster	Unattached	End of contract	10 July 2024	
12	GK	Brianna Edwards	Unattached	End of contract	10 July 2024	
7	FW	(United States) Isabel Cox	(United States) Brooklyn FC	End of contract	23 July 2024	
5	DF	Marisa van der Meer	Unattached	Mutual contract termination	20 August 2024	
27	MF	Helena Errington	Unattached	End of contract	20 August 2024	
14	MF	Michaela Robertson	Unattached	End of contract	19 September 2024	
5	DF	(Algeria) Imane Chebel	Unattached	Mutual contract termination	21 November 2024	

=== Contract extensions ===
No.	Player	Position	Duration	Date	Notes
23	Rebecca Lake	Centre-back	1 year	31 May 2024	
5	Marisa van der Meer	Defender	1 year	10 June 2024	
20	Emma Main	Forward	1 year	3 July 2024	
3	(Lebanon) Tiana Jaber	Defender	1 year	5 July 2024	
10	Alyssa Whinham	Attacking midfielder	2 years	11 July 2024	
22	Aimee Danieli	Goalkeeper	2 years	21 August 2024	Scholarship contract
15	Daisy Brazendale	Midfielder	2 years	21 August 2024	Signed a new contract until the end of 2025–26, replacing her previous scholarship contract.
19	Olivia Ingham	Midfielder	2 years	21 August 2024	Signed a new contract until the end of 2025–26, replacing her previous scholarship contract.
16	Annalie Longo	Attacking midfielder	1 year	19 September 2024	
22	Aimee Danieli	Goalkeeper	2 years	8 November 2024	Signed a new contract, replacing her previous scholarship contract.

== Competitions ==
=== Overall record ===
Competition	First match	Last match	Final position	Record							
Competition	First match	Last match	Final position	Pld	W	D	L	GF	GA	GD	Win %
A-League Women	1 November 2024	20 April 2025	9th	23	7	3	13	25	30	−5	30.43
Total				23	7	3	13	25	30	−5	30.43

Last updated: end of season.
Source: Competitions

=== A-League Women ===
==== League table ====
Pos	Team	Pld	W	D	L	GF	GA	GD	Pts
7	Brisbane Roar	23	8	2	13	46	42	+4	26
8	Sydney FC	23	7	4	12	23	29	−6	25
9	Wellington Phoenix (Note: Wellington Phoenix cannot qualify for the AFC Women's Champions League as they are based in New Zealand, which is part of the Oceania Football Confederation.)	23	7	3	13	25	30	−5	24
10	Perth Glory	23	6	4	13	27	43	−16	22
11	Newcastle Jets	23	5	5	13	29	53	−24	20

Source: A-Leagues
Rules for classification: 1) points; 2) goal difference; 3) goals scored; 4) wins; 5) head-to-head results; 5a) head-to-head points; 5b) head-to-head goal difference; 6) Fair Play points; 7) away goal difference; 8) away goals per match; 9) home goal difference; 10) home goals per match; 11) toss of a coin in an event of a tie of two clubs.

==== Matches ====
Win Draw Loss

All times are in local time (NZST/NZDT).

1 November 2024 1	Western United	4–2	Wellington Phoenix	Melbourne
21:00	Logarzo 17', 40'; Medwin 19'; Johnson 39'	Report	Grove 15' (o.g.); Main 82' (pen.)	Stadium: Ironbark Fields; Attendance: 807; Referee: Georgia Ghirardello

10 November 2024 2	Wellington Phoenix	0–1	Canberra United	Wellington
16:00		Report	Heyman 11'	Stadium: Porirua Park; Attendance: 645; Referee: Beth Rattray

17 November 2024 3	Newcastle Jets	1–0	Wellington Phoenix	Maitland
17:00	Davis 70'	Report		Stadium: Maitland Regional Sportsground (Note: Originally the match was scheduled to take place at No.2 Sportsground, but the venue was changed because the playing surface was not up to standard.); Attendance: 2,108; Referee: Bec Mackie

22 November 2024 4	Adelaide United	0–1	Wellington Phoenix	Sydney
19:30		Report	McCutcheon 45+3'	Stadium: Netstrata Jubilee Stadium (Note: Match moved from Leichhardt Oval following a pitch assessment.); Attendance: 878; Referee: Isabella Mossin

8 December 2024 5	Wellington Phoenix	2–1	Brisbane Roar	Wellington
16:00	Longo 34', 69'	Report	Pringle 46'	Stadium: Porirua Park; Attendance: 503; Referee: Rachael Mitchenson

13 December 2024 6	Melbourne Victory	1–1	Wellington Phoenix	Melbourne
21:00	Jancevski 51' (pen.)	Report	Elliott 90'	Stadium: The Home of the Matildas; Attendance: 725; Referee: Molly Godsell

21 December 2024 7	Wellington Phoenix	2–0	Sydney FC	Wellington
16:00	Jale 59'; McMeeken 88'	Report		Stadium: Porirua Park; Attendance: 435; Referee: Beth Rattray

28 December 2024 8	Melbourne City	2–1	Wellington Phoenix	Melbourne
19:00	Kelly 67' (o.g.); Hughes 69'	Report	Fergusson 37'	Stadium: ctrl:cyber Pitch; Attendance: 421; Referee: Kelly Jones

4 January 2025 10	Wellington Phoenix	2–0	Perth Glory	Wellington
16:00	Jale 47'; Fergusson 69'	Report		Stadium: Porirua Park; Attendance: 675; Referee: Mikayla Ryan

9 January 2025 9	Western Sydney Wanderers	0–3	Wellington Phoenix	Sydney
21:00		Report	Whinham 46'; Kelly 59'; Main 83'	Stadium: Wanderers Football Park; Attendance: 425; Referee: Isabella Mossin

12 January 2025 11	Adelaide United	2–1	Wellington Phoenix	Adelaide
19:30	Condon 41'; Dawber 44'	Report	León 59' (o.g.)	Stadium: Marden Sports Complex; Attendance: 748; Referee: Beth Rattray

19 January 2025 12	Wellington Phoenix	3–2	Newcastle Jets	Wellington
16:00	Elliott 50', 90+8'; Longo 59'	Report	Gallagher 3', 43'	Stadium: Porirua Park; Attendance: 915; Referee: Sarah Jones

26 January 2025 13	Central Coast Mariners	1–0	Wellington Phoenix	Woy Woy
19:00	Fuller 54'	Report		Stadium: Woy Woy Oval; Attendance: 721; Referee: Rachael Mitchenson

2 February 2025 14	Brisbane Roar	1–0	Wellington Phoenix	Brisbane
20:00	Kuilamu 62'	Report		Stadium: Perry Park; Attendance: 2,866; Referee: Molly Godsell

8 February 2025 15	Wellington Phoenix	1–1	Melbourne Victory	Wellington
16:00	McCutcheon 2'	Report	Flannery 61'	Stadium: Porirua Park; Attendance: 1,015; Referee: Kelly Jones

16 February 2025 16	Perth Glory	2–1	Wellington Phoenix	Perth
22:00	Dalton 31'; Jaber 71' (o.g.)	Report	Fergusson 45+1'	Stadium: Sam Kerr Football Centre; Attendance: 880; Referee: Molly Godsell

2 March 2025 17	Wellington Phoenix	1–3	Adelaide United	Wellington
16:00	Fergusson 41'	Report	Tonkin 4'; León 56', 86'	Stadium: Porirua Park; Attendance: 754; Referee: Beth Rattray

9 March 2025 18	Wellington Phoenix	2–1	Western Sydney Wanderers	Wellington
16:00	Tanaka 75'; Fergusson 86'	Report	Trew 22'	Stadium: Porirua Park; Attendance: 678; Referee: Isabella Mossin

15 March 2025 19	Sydney FC	2–1	Wellington Phoenix	Sydney
21:45	Caspers 49'; Ibini 90+8'	Report	Elliott 75'	Stadium: Allianz Stadium; Attendance: 1,507; Referee: Mikayla Ryan

22 March 2025 20	Wellington Phoenix	0–2	Central Coast Mariners	Wellington
16:00		Report	Rasmussen 45' (pen.); Gomez 52'	Stadium: Porirua Park; Attendance: 765; Referee: Georgia Ghirardello

30 March 2025 21	Wellington Phoenix	0–1	Melbourne City	Wellington
16:00		Report	McNamara 35'	Stadium: Porirua Park; Attendance: 862; Referee: Bec Mackie

13 April 2025 22	Canberra United	1–0	Wellington Phoenix	Canberra
17:00	Ayson 25'	Report		Stadium: McKellar Park; Attendance: 1,873; Referee: Rachael Mitchenson

20 April 2025 23	Wellington Phoenix	1–1	Western United	Wellington
16:00	Main 80'	Report	Eggesvik 75'	Stadium: Porirua Park; Attendance: 608; Referee: Beth Rattray

== Statistics ==
=== Appearances and goals ===
No.	Pos	Nat	Player	Total		A-League Women	
No.	Pos	Nat	Player	Apps	Goals	Apps	Goals
Goalkeepers:
13	GK	(New Zealand) NZL	Brooke Neary	1	0	0+1	0
22	GK	(New Zealand) NZL	Aimee Danieli	1	0	0+1	0
39	GK	(Portugal) POR	Carolina Vilão	23	0	23	0
Defenders:
2	DF	(New Zealand) NZL	Zoe McMeeken	19	1	8+11	1
3	DF	(Lebanon) LBN	Tiana Jaber	22	0	22	0
4	DF	(New Zealand) NZL	Mackenzie Barry	21	0	21	0
5	DF	(United States) USA	Alivia Kelly	19	1	15+4	1
12	DF	(New Zealand) NZL	Ella McMillan	2	0	0+2	0
21	DF	(New Zealand) NZL	Lara Wall	23	0	20+3	0
23	DF	(New Zealand) NZL	Rebecca Lake	2	0	2	0
Midfielders:
6	MF	(United States) USA	Maya McCutcheon	23	2	23	2
8	MF	(New Zealand) NZL	Amelia Abbott	4	0	0+4	0
10	MF	(New Zealand) NZL	Alyssa Whinham	22	1	17+5	1
11	MF	(New Zealand) NZL	Manaia Elliott	23	4	14+9	4
14	MF	(Japan) JPN	Mebae Tanaka	19	1	7+12	1
15	MF	(New Zealand) NZL	Daisy Brazendale	18	0	11+7	0
16	MF	(New Zealand) NZL	Annalie Longo	22	3	22	3
17	MF	(New Zealand) NZL	Ela Jerez	3	0	0+3	0
19	MF	(New Zealand) NZL	Olivia Ingham	8	0	1+7	0
Forwards:
7	FW	(New Zealand) NZL	Grace Jale	21	2	18+3	2
9	FW	(England) ENG	Olivia Fergusson	22	5	19+3	5
18	FW	(New Zealand) NZL	Ella McCann	0	0	0	0
20	FW	(New Zealand) NZL	Emma Main	22	3	10+12	3

- Source: Wellington Phoenix

=== Clean sheets ===
Includes all competitions. The list is sorted by squad number when total clean sheets are equal. Goalkeepers with no clean sheets not included in the list.

Rank	No.	Nat.	Goalkeeper	A-League Women	Total
1	39	(Portugal)	Carolina Vilão	4	4
Total				4	4

=== Disciplinary record ===
Includes all competitions. The list is sorted by squad number when total cards are equal. Players with no cards not included in the list.

No.	Pos.	Nat.	Name	A-League Women			Total		
No.	Pos.	Nat.	Name	Yellow card	(yellow card) (yellow-red card)	Red card	Yellow card	(yellow card) (yellow-red card)	Red card
3	DF	(Lebanon)	Tiana Jaber	7	1	0	7	1	0
5	DF	(United States)	Alivia Kelly	5	0	0	5	0	0
6	MF	(United States)	Maya McCutcheon	3	0	0	3	0	0
9	FW	(England)	Olivia Fergusson	3	0	0	3	0	0
4	DF	(New Zealand)	Mackenzie Barry	2	0	0	2	0	0
7	FW	(New Zealand)	Grace Jale	2	0	0	2	0	0
11	MF	(New Zealand)	Manaia Elliott	2	0	0	2	0	0
15	MF	(New Zealand)	Daisy Brazendale	2	0	0	2	0	0
2	DF	(New Zealand)	Zoe McMeeken	1	0	0	1	0	0
12	DF	(New Zealand)	Ella McMillan	1	0	0	1	0	0
17	MF	(New Zealand)	Ela Jerez	1	0	0	1	0	0
19	MF	(New Zealand)	Olivia Ingham	1	0	0	1	0	0
20	FW	(New Zealand)	Emma Main	1	0	0	1	0	0
21	DF	(New Zealand)	Lara Wall	1	0	0	1	0	0
39	GK	(Portugal)	Carolina Vilão	1	0	0	1	0	0
Total				33	1	0	33	1	0

== See also ==
- 2024–25 Wellington Phoenix FC season
