= 2023–24 Wellington Phoenix FC (women) season =

3rd season in existence of Wellington Phoenix (A-League Women)

Wellington Phoenix (A-League Women)
2023–24 season
- Chairman: Robert Morrison
- Manager: Paul Temple
- Stadium: Sky Stadium; Go Media Stadium; Jerry Collins Stadium
- A-League Women: 8th
- A-League Women Finals: DNQ
- Top goalscorer: Mariana Speckmaier (10)
- Highest home attendance: 5,532 vs. Perth Glory (25 November 2023); A-League Women
- Lowest home attendance: 612 vs. Adelaide United (20 March 2024); A-League Women
- Average home league attendance: 1,899
- Biggest win: 3–0 vs. Western Sydney Wanderers (A) (22 October 2023); A-League Women
- Biggest defeat: 0–3 vs. Western United (A) (18 February 2024); A-League Women
Home colours	Away colours

The 2023–24 season was the third in the history of Wellington Phoenix FC (women).

== Players ==
=== First-team squad ===
Note: Flags indicate national team as defined under FIFA eligibility rules; some limited exceptions apply. Players may hold more than one non-FIFA nationality.

No.	Pos.	Nation	Player
1	GK	CAN	Rylee Foster
2	DF	NZL	Zoe McMeeken (scholarship)
3	DF	NZL	Kate Taylor
4	DF	NZL	Mackenzie Barry
5	DF	NZL	Marisa van der Meer
7	FW	USA	Isabel Cox (injury replacement)
8	FW	NZL	Grace Wisnewski
9	FW	NZL	Kelli Brown
10	MF	NZL	Alyssa Whinham
11	MF	USA	Hope Breslin
12	GK	NZL	Brianna Edwards
13	DF	NZL	Michaela Foster (vice-captain)

No.	Pos.	Nation	Player
14	MF	NZL	Michaela Robertson
15	MF	NZL	Daisy Brazendale (scholarship)
16	MF	NZL	Annalie Longo (captain)
17	FW	VEN	Mariana Speckmaier
18	DF	USA	Hailey Davidson
19	MF	NZL	Olivia Ingham (scholarship)
20	MF	NZL	Emma Main
21	MF	NZL	Manaia Elliott
22	GK	NZL	Aimee Danieli (amateur)
23	DF	NZL	Rebecca Lake
26	DF	AUS	Tiana Jaber (injury replacement)
27	MF	NZL	Helena Errington (scholarship)

== Transfers ==
=== Transfers in ===
No.	Position	Player	Transferred from	Type/fee	Contract length	Date	Ref.
23	DF	Rebecca Lake	(New Zealand) Canterbury United Pride	Free transfer	1 year	28 July 2023	
11	MF	(United States) Hope Breslin	(United States) Houston Dash	Free transfer	1 year	10 August 2023	
18	DF	(United States) Hailey Davidson	(Sweden) Mallbacken	Free transfer	1 year	15 August 2023	
6	MF	Macey Fraser	Unattached	Free transfer	3 years	16 August 2023	
17	FW	(Venezuela) Mariana Speckmaier	(United States) Washington Spirit	Free transfer	1 year	18 August 2023	
9	FW	Kelli Brown	(Australia) Macarthur Rams	Free transfer	1 year	6 September 2023	
16	MF	Annalie Longo	Unattached	Free transfer	1 year	13 September 2023	
1	GK	(Canada) Rylee Foster	Unattached	Free transfer	1 year	19 September 2023	
7	FW	(United States) Isabel Cox	(United States) North Carolina Tar Heels	Injury replacement	6 months	7 December 2023	
26	DF	(Australia) Tiana Jaber	Unattached	Injury replacement	6 months	27 December 2023	
27	MF	Helena Errington	(Portugal) Sporting CP	Scholarship	6 months	27 December 2023	

==== From academy squad ====
N	Pos.	Nat.	Name	Age	Notes
15	MF	(New Zealand)	Daisy Brazendale	17	three-year scholarship contract
21	MF	(New Zealand)	Manaia Elliott	18	three-year scholarship contract. Contract upgraded on 28 January 2024.
19	MF	(New Zealand)	Olivia Ingham	17	three-year scholarship contract
22	GK	(New Zealand)	Aimee Danieli	18	amateur contract

=== Transfers out ===
No.	Position	Player	Transferred to	Type/fee	Date	Ref.
11	MF	Betsy Hassett	(Iceland) Stjarnan	End of contract	24 May 2023	
9	FW	Ava Pritchard	Unattached	Free transfer	23 June 2023	
19	DF	Charlotte Lancaster	Unattached	Free transfer	23 June 2023	
18	DF	Te Reremoana Walker	Unattached	Free transfer	23 June 2023	
2	DF	Saskia Vosper	Unattached	Free transfer	23 June 2023	
22	GK	Georgia Candy	Unattached	Free transfer	23 June 2023	
20	FW	Milly Clegg	Western Sydney Wanderers	Free transfer	11 July 2023	
17	DF	(Australia) Claudia Cicco	Newcastle Jets	Free transfer	28 July 2023	
6	MF	(Australia) Isabel Gomez	Central Coast Mariners	Free transfer	4 August 2023	
13	FW	Paige Satchell	Unattached	Free transfer	10 August 2023	
16	MF	Emma Rolston	Unattached	Free transfer	10 August 2023	
1	GK	Lily Alfeld	Unattached	End of contract	5 September 2023	
7	MF	Chloe Knott	Unattached	Mutual contract termination	30 November 2023	
6	MF	Macey Fraser	(United States) Utah Royals	Undisclosed	17 April 2024	

=== Contract extensions ===
No.	Position	Player	Duration	Date	Ref.
20	Emma Main	Forward	1 year	13 June 2023	
14	Michaela Robertson	Forward	1 year	15 June 2023	
4	Mackenzie Barry	Defender	2 years	21 June 2023	
5	Marisa van der Meer	Defender	1 year	21 June 2023	
3	Kate Taylor	Defender	1 year	1 August 2023	
8	Grace Wisnewski	Midfielder	1 year	3 August 2023	
13	Michaela Foster	Defender	1 year	8 August 2023	
12	Brianna Edwards	Goalkeeper	1 year	8 August 2023	
2	Zoe McMeeken	Defender	2 years	22 August 2023	

== Pre-season and friendlies ==
3 October 2023	Newcastle Jets (Australia)	1–2	(New Zealand) Wellington Phoenix	Lisarow
15:00 AEDT	Goal	Report	Taylor (pen.); Wisnewski	Stadium: Pluim Park

7 October 2023	Central Coast Mariners (Australia)	2–3	(New Zealand) Wellington Phoenix	Gosford
16:00 AEDT	Trimis (?); Galic (?)	Report	Main (?); Elliott (?); Knott (?)	Stadium: Industree Group Stadium; Attendance: ~3,000

== Competitions ==
=== Overall record ===
Competition	First match	Last match	Starting round	Final position	Record							
Competition	First match	Last match	Starting round	Final position	Pld	W	D	L	GF	GA	GD	Win %
A-League Women	15 October 2023	30 March 2024	Matchday 1	8th	22	9	1	12	36	33	+3	40.91
Total					22	9	1	12	36	33	+3	40.91

Source: Soccerway

=== A-League Women ===
==== League table ====
Pos	Team	Pld	W	D	L	GF	GA	GD	Pts	Qualification
6	Newcastle Jets	22	10	3	9	43	36	+7	33	Qualification to Finals series
7	Western Sydney Wanderers	22	10	3	9	30	30	0	33	
8	Wellington Phoenix (Note: Wellington Phoenix cannot qualify for Asian Football Confederation competitions as they are based in New Zealand, which is under the Oceania Football Confederation.)	22	9	1	12	36	33	+3	28	
9	Brisbane Roar	22	7	5	10	28	35	−7	26	
10	Perth Glory	22	6	6	10	25	32	−7	24	

Source: A-Leagues
Rules for classification: 1) points; 2) wins; 3) goal difference; 4) goals scored; 5) head-to-head results; 6) Fair Play points; 7) away head-to-head results; 8) home head-to-head results; 9) toss of a coin

==== Results summary ====
Overall								Home						Away					
Pld	W	D	L	GF	GA	GD	Pts	W	D	L	GF	GA	GD	W	D	L	GF	GA	GD
21	9	1	11	35	31	+4	28	7	1	2	21	10	+11	2	0	9	14	21	−7

Source: KEEPUP

==== Results by round ====
Round	1	2	3	4	5	6	7	8	9	10	11	12	13	14	15	17	18	19	20	16	21	22
Ground	H	A	H	H	A	H	H	A	H	A	A	N	A	H	A	A	A	A	H	H	A	H
Result	L	W	W	W	L	W	D	L	W	L	L	L	L	W	L	L	L	W	L	W	L	W
Position	9	4	3	3	3	3	3	4	3	4	6	7	9	7	9	9	10	10	10	8	9	8
Points	0	3	6	9	9	12	13	13	16	16	16	16	16	19	19	19	19	22	22	25	25	28

Updated to match(es) played on 30 March 2024. Source: KEEPUP
A = Away; H = Home; N = Neutral; W = Win; D = Draw; L = Loss

==== Matches ====
Win Draw Loss

15 October 2023 1	Wellington Phoenix	0–1	Melbourne City	Wellington
15:00 NZDT		Report	Wilkinson 73'	Stadium: Sky Stadium; Attendance: 2,505; Referee: Beth Rattray

22 October 2023 2	Western Sydney Wanderers	0–3	Wellington Phoenix	Sydney
17:45 AEDT		Report	Speckmaier 68'; Fraser 83'; Elliott 87'	Stadium: CommBank Stadium; Attendance: 2,461; Referee: Isabella Libri

4 November 2023 3	Wellington Phoenix	2–1	Brisbane Roar	Wellington
14:45 NZDT	Speckmaier 6'; Longo 85'	Report	Corbin 90+4'	Stadium: Sky Stadium; Attendance: 1,788; Referee: Georgia Ghirardello

12 November 2023 4	Wellington Phoenix	3–1	Western United	Porirua
16:00 NZDT	Knott 31'; Fraser 41'; Hieda 76' (o.g.)	Report	Logarzo 90+3'	Stadium: Jerry Collins Stadium; Attendance: 1,746; Referee: Beth Rattray

18 November 2023 5	Central Coast Mariners	1–0	Wellington Phoenix	Gosford
18:00 AEDT	Rasmussen 76'	Report		Stadium: Industree Group Stadium; Attendance: 1,654; Referee: Azusa Sugino

25 November 2023 6	Wellington Phoenix	2–1	Perth Glory	Auckland
14:45 NZDT	Breslin 48'; Knott 61'	Report	Farrow 21'	Stadium: Go Media Stadium; Attendance: 5,532; Referee: Bec Mackie

10 December 2023 7	Wellington Phoenix	2–2	Melbourne Victory	Porirua
16:00 NZDT	Taylor 17'; Main 24'	Report	Morrison 15'; Okino 37'	Stadium: Jerry Collins Stadium; Attendance: 672; Referee: Anna-Marie Keighley

16 December 2023 8	Adelaide United	2–1	Wellington Phoenix	Adelaide
17:00 ACDT	Condon 75'; Sasaki 85'	Report	Main 21'	Stadium: Marden Sports Complex; Attendance: 593; Referee: Rebecca Durcau

23 December 2023 9	Wellington Phoenix	2–0	Newcastle Jets	Wellington
14:45 NZDT	Speckmaier 34' (pen.); Breslin 39'	Report		Stadium: Sky Stadium; Attendance: 2,614; Referee: Mikayla Ryan

29 December 2023 10	Sydney FC	1–0	Wellington Phoenix	Sydney
17:00 AEDT	J. Dos Santos 78'	Report		Stadium: Allianz Stadium; Attendance: 4,866; Referee: Bec Mackie

7 January 2024 11	Brisbane Roar	2–1	Wellington Phoenix	Brisbane
17:00 AEST	Yallop 34'; Stephenson 46'	Report	Cox 20'	Stadium: Perry Park; Attendance: 1,955; Referee: Caitlin Williams

12 January 2024 12	Wellington Phoenix	1–2	Central Coast Mariners	Sydney
19:45 AEDT	Main 3'	Report	Badawiya 23'; Trimis 34'	Stadium: Leichhardt Oval; Attendance: 1,938; Referee: Bec Mackie
Note: Originally scheduled for 13 January 2024, was moved due to Unite Round.

20 January 2024 13	Melbourne City	2–1	Wellington Phoenix	Melbourne
17:00 AEDT	Pollicina 51'; Ekic 74'	Report	Speckmaier 78'	Stadium: City Football Academy; Attendance: 1,124; Referee: Isabella Libri

28 January 2024 14	Wellington Phoenix	2–0	Canberra United	Porirua
17:00 NZDT	Speckmaier 43', 52'	Report		Stadium: Jerry Collins Stadium; Attendance: 1,227; Referee: Molly Godsell

4 February 2024 15	Newcastle Jets	3–2	Wellington Phoenix	Newcastle
17:00 AEDT	Karipidis 33'; Copus-Brown 50'; Bolden 65'	Report	Speckmaier 4'; Cox 56'	Stadium: No.2 Sportsground; Attendance: 1,634; Referee: Caitlin Williams

18 February 2024 17	Western United	3–0	Wellington Phoenix	Melbourne
17:00 AEDT	Logarzo 29'; Maher 72'; Keane 78'	Report		Stadium: City Vista Recreation Reserve; Attendance: 638; Referee: Casey Reibelt

3 March 2024 18	Melbourne Victory	5–3	Wellington Phoenix	Melbourne
14:00 AEDT	Goad 10', 35'; Hansen 17'; Foster 45' (o.g.); Lowe 64'	Report	Rankin 57' (o.g.); Robertson 90'; Speckmaier 90+1'	Stadium: The Home of the Matildas; Attendance: 1,087; Referee: Rebecca Durcau

8 March 2024 19	Perth Glory	1–3	Wellington Phoenix	Perth
19:00 AWST	Foster 42' (o.g.)	Report	Whinham 24'; Robertson 56'; Fraser 78'	Stadium: Macedonia Park; Attendance: 964; Referee: Georgia Ghirardello

17 March 2024 20	Wellington Phoenix	2–4	Sydney FC	Porirua
14:00 NZDT	Cox 63'; Speckmaier 71'	Report	Vine 18', 56'; Jaber 42' (o.g.); Thompson 74'	Stadium: Jerry Collins Stadium; Attendance: 1,010; Referee: Bec Mackie

20 March 2024 16	Wellington Phoenix	4–0	Adelaide United	Porirua
17:00 NZDT	Speckmaier 13'; Taylor 59'; Robertson 65'; Foster 90+1'	Report		Stadium: Jerry Collins Stadium; Attendance: 612; Referee: Mikayla Ryan
Note: Originally scheduled for 11 February. Rescheduled due to players involvement in the 2024 OFC Women's Olympic Qualifying Tournament.

24 March 2024 21	Canberra United	1–0	Wellington Phoenix	Canberra
14:00 AEDT	Heyman 78'	Report		Stadium: McKellar Park; Attendance: 1,341; Referee: Isabella Mossin

30 March 2024 22	Wellington Phoenix	2–0	Western Sydney Wanderers	Porirua
14:00 NZDT	Main 18', 55'	Report		Stadium: Jerry Collins Stadium; Attendance: 1,280; Referee: Caitlin Williams

== Statistics ==
=== Appearances and goals ===
Includes all competitions. Players with no appearances not included in the list.

No.	Pos.	Nat.	Name	A-League Women		Total	
No.	Pos.	Nat.	Name	Apps	Goals	Apps	Goals
1	GK	(Canada)	Rylee Foster	19	0	19	0
2	DF	(New Zealand)	Zoe McMeeken	9+7	0	16	0
3	DF	(New Zealand)	Kate Taylor	16+1	2	17	2
4	DF	(New Zealand)	Mackenzie Barry	19+1	0	20	0
5	DF	(New Zealand)	Marisa van der Meer	6	0	6	0
6	MF	(New Zealand)	Macey Fraser	18+1	3	19	3
7	FW	(United States)	Isabel Cox	10+2	3	12	3
8	MF	(New Zealand)	Grace Wisnewski	2+1	0	3	0
9	FW	(New Zealand)	Kelli Brown	1+6	0	7	0
10	MF	(New Zealand)	Alyssa Whinham	7+9	1	16	1
11	MF	(United States)	Hope Breslin	17+5	2	22	2
12	GK	(New Zealand)	Brianna Edwards	3+1	0	4	0
13	DF	(New Zealand)	Michaela Foster	19+1	1	20	1
14	FW	(New Zealand)	Michaela Robertson	3+6	3	9	3
15	MF	(Australia)	Daisy Brazendale	4+2	0	6	0
16	MF	(New Zealand)	Annalie Longo	10+3	1	13	1
17	FW	(Venezuela)	Mariana Speckmaier	18+3	10	21	10
18	DF	(United States)	Hailey Davidson	18+3	0	21	0
19	MF	(New Zealand)	Olivia Ingham	0+1	0	1	0
20	FW	(New Zealand)	Emma Main	15+3	5	18	5
21	DF	(New Zealand)	Manaia Elliott	6+10	1	16	1
22	GK	(New Zealand)	Aimee Feinberg-Danieli	0+1	0	1	0
23	DF	(New Zealand)	Rebecca Lake	11+6	0	17	0
25	DF	(New Zealand)	Ella McMillan	0+1	0	1	0
26	DF	(Australia)	Tiana Jaber	7+4	0	11	0
27	MF	(New Zealand)	Helena Errington	0+5	0	5	0
Player(s) transferred out but featured this season
7	MF	(New Zealand)	Chloe Knott	4+3	2	7	2

=== Disciplinary record ===
Includes all competitions. The list is sorted by squad number when total cards are equal. Players with no cards not included in the list.

Rank	No.	Pos.	Nat.	Name	A-League Women			Total		
Rank	No.	Pos.	Nat.	Name	Yellow card	(yellow card) (yellow-red card)	Red card	Yellow card	(yellow card) (yellow-red card)	Red card
1	1	GK	(Canada)	Rylee Foster	0	0	1	0	0	1
2	11	MF	(United States)	Hope Breslin	4	0	0	4	0	0
3	10	MF	(New Zealand)	Alyssa Whinham	3	0	0	3	0	0
3	21	DF	(New Zealand)	Manaia Elliott	3	0	0	3	0	0
5	18	DF	(United States)	Hailey Davidson	2	0	0	2	0	0
5	20	FW	(New Zealand)	Emma Main	2	0	0	2	0	0
5	23	DF	(New Zealand)	Rebecca Lake	2	0	0	2	0	0
8	3	DF	(New Zealand)	Kate Taylor	1	0	0	1	0	0
8	4	DF	(New Zealand)	Mackenzie Barry	1	0	0	1	0	0
8	6	MF	(New Zealand)	Macey Fraser	1	0	0	1	0	0
8	13	DF	(New Zealand)	Michaela Foster	1	0	0	1	0	0
8	16	MF	(New Zealand)	Annalie Longo	1	0	0	1	0	0
8	17	FW	(Venezuela)	Mariana Speckmaier	1	0	0	1	0	0
Total					22	0	1	22	0	1

=== Clean sheets ===
Includes all competitions. The list is sorted by squad number when total clean sheets are equal. Numbers in parentheses represent games where both goalkeepers participated and both kept a clean sheet; the number in parentheses is awarded to the goalkeeper who was substituted on, whilst a full clean sheet is awarded to the goalkeeper who was on the field at the start of play. Goalkeepers with no clean sheets not included in the list.

Rank	No.	Nat.	Goalkeeper	A-League Women	Total
1	1	(Canada)	Rylee Foster	5	5
2	12	(New Zealand)	Brianna Edwards	0 (1)	0 (1)
2	22	(New Zealand)	Aimee Feinberg-Danieli	0 (1)	0 (1)
Total				5 (2)	5 (2)

== Awards ==
=== Players ===
No.	Pos.	Player	Award	Source
1	GK	(Canada) Rylee Foster	A-League Women Player of the Month (October/November)	
1	GK	(Canada) Rylee Foster	A-League Women Player of the Month (December)	
17	FW	(Venezuela) Mariana Speckmaier	A-League Women Player of the Month (March)	

=== Managers ===
Manager	Award	Source
(New Zealand) Paul Temple	A-League Women Coach of the Month (October/November)	
(New Zealand) Paul Temple	A-League Women Coach of the Month (December)	

== See also ==
- 2023–24 Wellington Phoenix FC season
