= Zoe McMeeken =

New Zealand footballer (born 2003)

- McMeeken playing for Melbourne Victory in 2026

Personal information
- Full name: Zoe Ann Aislabie McMeeken
- Date of birth: 11 March 2004 (age 22)
- Place of birth: Melbourne, Australia
- Height: 1.78 m (5 ft 10 in)
- Position: Fullback

Team information
- Current team: Melbourne Victory
- Number: 19

Youth career
- Selwyn United
- Halswell United
- Coastal Spirit

Senior career*
Years	Team	Apps	(Gls)
2020–2021	Canterbury United Pride		
2021–2025	Wellington Phoenix	55	(1)
2025–	Melbourne Victory	6	(1)

International career^{‡}
2022–2024	New Zealand U20	6	(0)
- * Club domestic league appearances and goals as of 5 May 2026 ‡ National team caps and goals as of 5 May 2026

Zoe Ann Aislabie McMeeken (born 11 March 2004) is an Australian-born New Zealand professional footballer who plays as a fullback for Melbourne Victory of the A-League Women. She previously played for New Zealand Women's National League (NZWNL) club Canterbury United Pride and for the youth teams of Canterbury Women's Premiership League clubs Selwyn United, Halswell United, and Coastal Spirit. McMeeken represented the New Zealand under-20 national team from 2022 to 2024.

== Early life ==
McMeeken was born on 11 March 2004 in Melbourne, Australia. McMeeken played for the youth teams of Selwyn United, Halswell United AFC, and Coastal Spirit FC. She was educated at Lincoln High School in Lincoln, Canterbury, New Zealand. McMeeken did athletics in her youth and represented New Zealand at the youth level, excelling at the 1500 m, and also competing at the javelin throw and decathlon.

== Club career ==
=== Canterbury United Pride ===
McMeeken played for Canterbury United Pride of the New Zealand Women's National League from 2020 to 2021. She formed part of the team that won a third successive national league title in 2020, along with future Phoenix teammates Kate Taylor and Alyssa Whinham.

=== Wellington Phoenix ===
In 2021, the Wellington Phoenix signed McMeeken on a scholarship contract to form part of the Phoenix's inaugural season in the A-League Women, where she was the club's youngest signing. McMeeken made her debut in a 0–0 draw against the Western Sydney Wanderers FC in the first match of the club's history on 3 December 2021. McMeeken started in all but one of the club's matches in their inaugural season. On 6 September 2022, the Phoenix re-signed McMeeken on a one-year contract.

In the 2022–23 season McMeeken was limited to 7 appearances, 6 of which were off the bench. In August 2023, the Phoenix renewed her contract for another two years.

The following season, McMeeken was played as both a right-back and a left-back, in a campaign in which she made 16 appearances.

McMeeken played her last campaign for the Wellington Phoenix in the 2024–25 season. McMeeken made 19 appearances and scored a goal against Sydney FC in a 2–0 win on 21 December 2024. On 2 March 2025, McMeeken made her 50th appearance for the Phoenix in a match against Adelaide United at Porirua Park.

The Wellington Phoenix announced both McMeeken's and Amelia Abbott's departures on 11 July 2025.

=== Melbourne Victory ===
On 19 September 2025, Melbourne Victory announced the signing of McMeeken on a one-year contract. She made her Victory debut in the first match of the season, playing 89 minutes in a 3–2 away defeat to Brisbane Roar FC on 1 December 2025. On 9 December, McMeeken scored a goal and contributed an assist in a 4–1 win against the Western Sydney Wanderers. McMeeken suffered an injury in December 2025.

On 15 September 2026, Victory re-signed McMeeken to a further one-year contract with the club.

== International career ==
=== New Zealand U20 ===
On 26 July 2022, McMeeken was named as part of the 21-player Junior Football Ferns squad for the 2022 FIFA U-20 Women's World Cup in Costa Rica. She played in all three of New Zealand's matches, with the team exiting the tournament at the group stage following two draws and one defeat.

On 20 August 2024, McMeeken was named as part of the 21-player Junior Football Ferns squad for the 2024 FIFA U-20 Women's World Cup in Colombia. McMeeken played in each of New Zealand's three Group E stage matches, with the team exiting the tournament at the conclusion of the group stage.

== Honours ==
Canterbury United Pride

- New Zealand Women's National League: 2020.
