= Daisy Brazendale =

New Zealand footballer (born 2006)

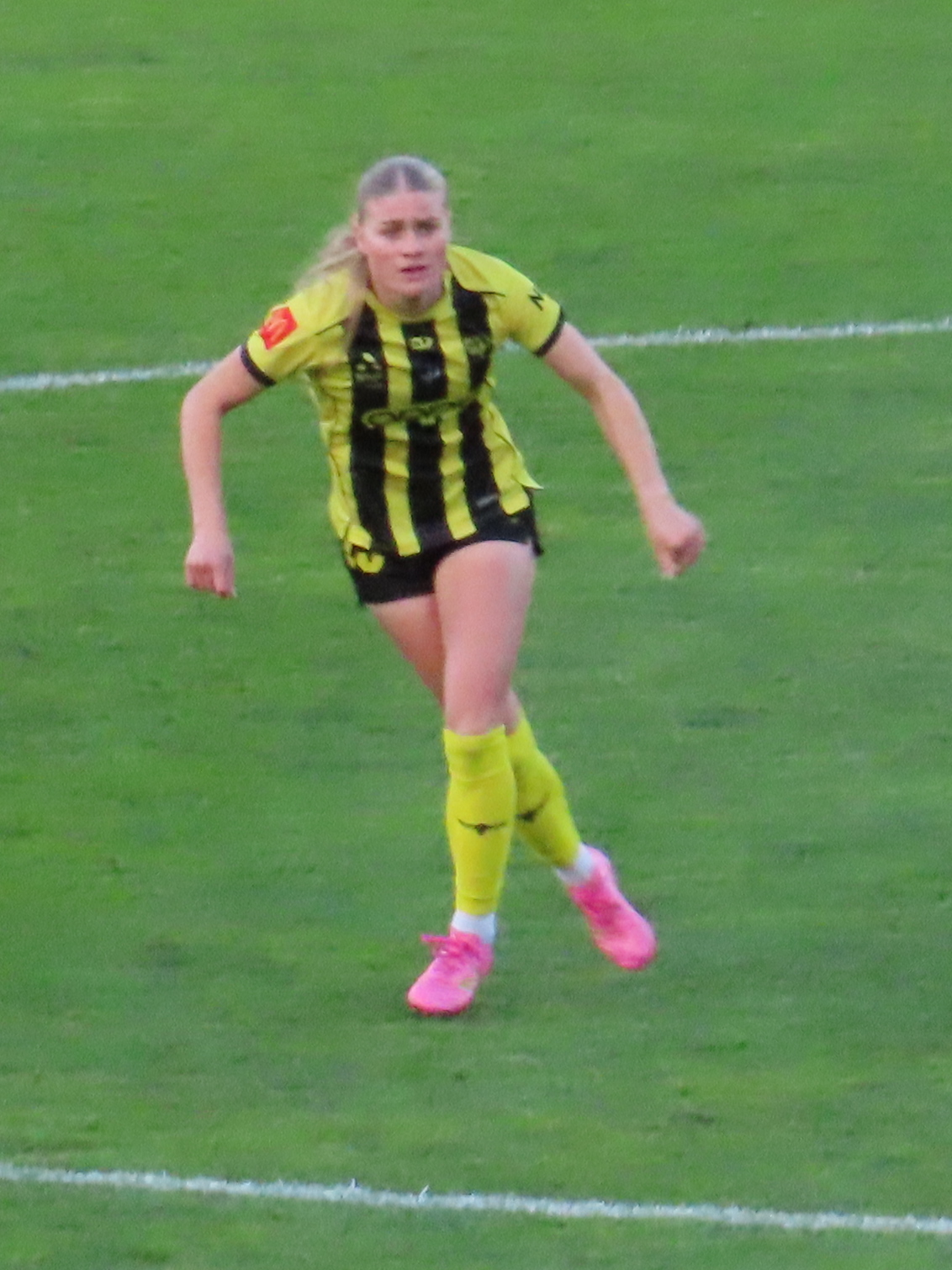
- Brazendale playing for the Wellington Phoenix in 2026.

Personal information
- Full name: Daisy Awhina Brazendale
- Date of birth: 12 March 2006 (age 20)
- Height: 1.63 m (5 ft 4 in)
- Position: Midfielder

Youth career
- Tasman United
- FC Nelson
- 2022–2023: Wellington Phoenix Academy

Senior career*
Years	Team	Apps	(Gls)
2023–2026	Wellington Phoenix	44	(0)

International career^{‡}
2024–	New Zealand U20	12	(0)
- * Club domestic league appearances and goals as of 14 September 2026 ‡ National team caps and goals as of 14 September 2026

Daisy Awhina Brazendale (born 12 March 2006) is a professional footballer who plays as a midfielder.

She previously played for the Nelson Women's Premiership League club FC Nelson before joining the Wellington Phoenix Academy in 2022. The following year, she was promoted to the for the Wellington Phoenix's senior team. Born in the United Kingdom, Brazendale represents New Zealand at youth international level.

== Early life ==
Brazendale was born on 12 March 2006 in Surrey, England, and moved to Golden Bay / Mohua, Tasman District, New Zealand at a young age.

== Club career ==
=== Golden Bay FC, Tasman United and FC Nelson ===
In her junior and youth football career, Brazendale played for Golden Bay FC, Tasman United and FC Nelson. She initially played as a goalkeeper before becoming a midfielder.

=== Wellington Phoenix ===
In 2022, Brazendale and her family moved to Wellington to join the Wellington Phoenix Academy. She played for the reserves team of the academy in 2023 and 2024.

The Wellington Phoenix signed Brazendale into their main squad ahead of the 2023–24 season, when she was signed to a professional (scholarship) contract on a three-year deal alongside Olivia Ingham and Manaia Elliott. She was the youngest player named in the squad. Brazendale made her debut on 28 January 2024 in a 2–0 win against Canberra United. She made 6 appearances in her first season.

In August 2024, the Phoenix upgraded Brazendale's contract from a scholarship contract to a full senior deal.

During the 2024–25 season, Brazendale made 18 appearances.

In August 2026, Brazendale departed Wellington Phoenix at the conclusion of her contract.

== International career ==
=== New Zealand U20 ===
Brazendale made her NZ U20 debut in a friendly against Australia. The game, part of the warm up for the World Cup, was played at Porirua Park and finished 1-1 On 20 August 2024, Brazendale was named as part of the 21-player Junior Football Ferns squad for the 2024 FIFA U-20 Women's World Cup in Colombia. She played in all three of New Zealand's matches, with the team exiting the tournament at the group stage following three defeats.

Brazendale was selected as part of the Junior Football Ferns squad for the 2025 OFC U-19 Women's Championship held in Tahiti between September and October. She played in all five matches and captained the team on three occasions. New Zealand won the tournament, defeating New Caledonia 3–0 in the final.

On 17 August 2026, Brazendale was named in the 21-player squad for the 2026 FIFA U-20 Women's World Cup in Poland in September. Brazendale was one of two players, alongside Zoe Benson, to feature in this U-20 Women's World Cup as well as the 2024 edition. The Junior Football Ferns played against Japan, Italy, and the United States in Group D. Brazendale made three appearances and captained New Zealand in the tournament, with the team exiting the tournament following the group stage's conclusion.

=== New Zealand ===
On 22 September 2026, Brazendale was called up to the senior Football Ferns team for the first time, alongside Helena Errington, for the friendly matches against Panama on 10 and 13 October 2026. However, the two-match series was cancelled due to the 2026 Panama earthquake.

== Honours ==
New Zealand U20

- OFC U-19 Women's Championship: 2025
