= Tiana Jaber =

Footballer (born 2000)

- Jaber with Lebanon in 2025

Personal information
- Date of birth: 9 May 2000 (age 26)
- Place of birth: Penrith, New South Wales, Australia
- Position: Defender

Team information
- Current team: Western Sydney Wanderers
- Number: 2

Youth career
- Glenwood Redbacks
- 2019–2020: Western Sydney Wanderers

Senior career*
Years	Team	Apps	(Gls)
2019	NWS Koalas	20	(0)
2019–2020	Western Sydney Wanderers	1	(0)
2020	Sydney University	11	(0)
2020–2021	Newcastle Jets	4	(0)
2021	West Canberra Wanderers	7	(0)
2021	Belconnen United	6	(0)
2021–2022	Newcastle Jets	12	(1)
2022	Bankstown City	21	(0)
2023	Western United	3	(0)
2023	Bankstown City	16	(1)
2023	Wellington Phoenix	11	(0)
2023	Sydney Olympic	12	(1)
2023–2026	Wellington Phoenix	28	(0)
2026–	Western Sydney Wanderers	3	(0)

International career^{‡}
2025	Lebanon	10	(0)
- * Club domestic league appearances and goals as of 1 November 2026 ‡ National team caps and goals as of 19 July 2025

Tiana Jaber (Arabic: تيانا جابر, pronounced [tiˈʔaːna ˈʒaːber]; born 9 May 2000) is a professional soccer player who plays as a defender for A-League Women club Western Sydney Wanderers. Born in Australia, she has played for the Lebanon national team.

== Early life ==
Jaber grew up in Western Sydney, where she attended Glenwood High School. She is of Lebanese heritage through her father, and of Italian heritage through her mother.

== Club career ==
=== NWS Koalas and Western Sydney Wanderers ===
A youth product of the Glenwood Redbacks, Jaber began her senior career with NWS Koalas in the National Premier Leagues NSW Women's competition. In 2019, she signed a scholarship contract with the Western Sydney Wanderers. On 14 February 2020, her deal was upgraded to a professional contract as she began training regularly with the first team. She made her W-League debut on 20 February 2020, coming on as a substitute in a 4–0 defeat to Melbourne City.

=== Sydney University ===
Jaber's debut proved to be her only appearance for the Wanderers, as she departed at the end of the 2019–20 season to join Sydney University in the NPL NSW. The 2020 campaign was a successful one, with Sydney University claiming the Premiership before falling 2–1 to Manly United in the Grand Final.

=== Newcastle Jets and NPL ACT ===
Ahead of the 2020–21 season, Jaber returned to the W-League with the Newcastle Jets. She featured in four matches during her first season, competing with Tessa Tamplin for the full-back position, and became the 112th player to represent the club.

Following that campaign she joined NPL ACT side West Canberra Wanderers – playing between April and May 2021 – where her combative style of play earned her multiple yellow cards. Later that year, she moved to Belconnen United, playing from June to August 2021.

In September 2021, Jaber re-signed with Newcastle for the 2021–22 season. She started the opening match against Sydney FC but was sent off in the 77th minute of a 3–1 defeat. Returning from suspension in Round 3, she scored her first A-League Women goal with a long-range strike in a 1–1 draw against her former club Western Sydney Wanderers.

=== Bankstown City and Western United ===
In 2022, Jaber played for Bankstown City in the NPL NSW before joining A-League Women expansion club Western United in February 2023 until the end of the 2022–23 A-League Women season. She was signed as an injury replacement for Aimee Medwin, who had suffered an anterior cruciate ligament injury. Jaber contributed to Western United's run to the Grand Final in their inaugural season. She later returned to Bankstown City for the 2023 NPL NSW season.

=== Wellington Phoenix and Sydney Olympic ===
In December 2023, Jaber signed with Wellington Phoenix as an injury replacement for Marisa van der Meer for the remainder of the 2023–24 A-League Women season.

She joined Sydney Olympic for the 2024 NPL NSW campaign, before re-signing with the Phoenix in July 2024 on a full-season contract. On 23 June 2025, Jaber signed a two-year contract with Wellington Phoenix.

On 14 July 2026, it was announced that Jaber had left the club on mutual consent; she played 39 games in two-and-a-half seasons with the Phoenix.

=== Return to Western Sydney Wanderers ===
On 4 August 2026, Western Sydney Wanderers announced the return of Jaber on a one-year deal ahead of the 2026–27 A-League Women season.

== International career ==
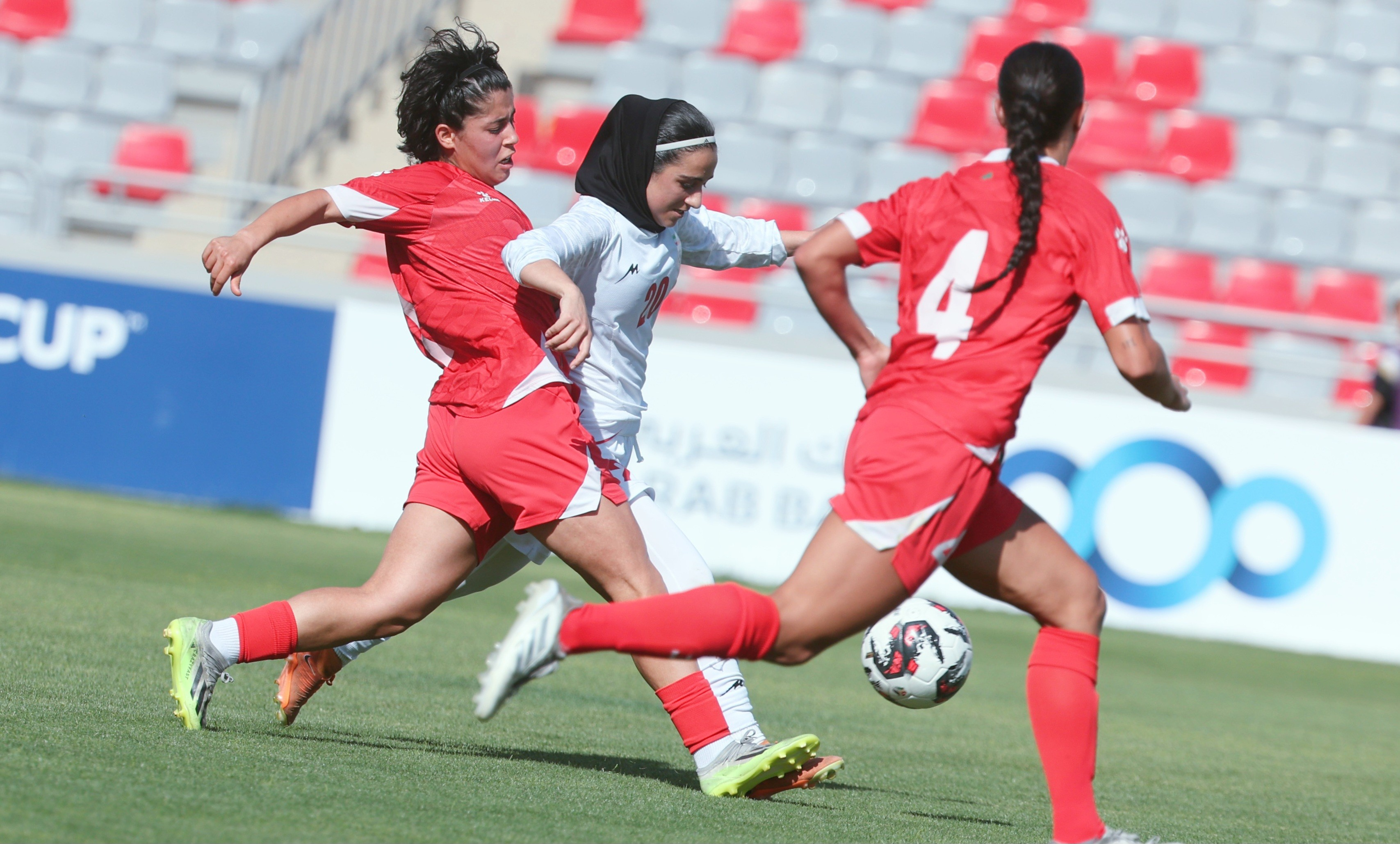
Jaber (number 4) for Lebanon in a match against Iran in 2026.

Born in Australia, Jaber was eligible to represent Australia through birth, Lebanon through her father, and Italy through her mother.

In July 2024, she accepted a call-up to a training camp with the Lebanon national team. She made her international debut on 20 February 2025, starting in a friendly tournament match against Nepal, which Lebanon lost 1–0.

== Style of play ==
Jaber is a defender that plays both centrally, in a back four or back three, and as a full-back. She is particularly noted for her speed.

== Career statistics ==
=== Club ===
As of match played 1 November 2026

Appearances and goals by club, season and competition
Club	Season	League			Other		Total	
Club	Season	Division	Apps	Goals	Apps	Goals	Apps	Goals
NWS Koalas	2019	NPL NSW	20	0	—		20	0
Western Sydney Wanderers	2019–20	W-League	1	0	—		1	0
Sydney University	2020	NPL NSW	11	0	—		11	0
Newcastle Jets	2020–21	W-League	4	0	—		4	0
West Canberra Wanderers	2021	NPL ACT	7	0	2 (Note: Appearances in Federation Cup)	0	9	0
Belconnen United	2021	NPL ACT	6	0	—		6	0
Newcastle Jets	2021–22	A-League	12	1	—		12	1
Bankstown City	2022	NPL NSW	21	0	—		21	0
Western United	2022–23	A-League	3	0	—		3	0
Bankstown City	2023	NPL NSW	16	1	1 (Note: Appearance(s) in Sapphire Cup)	0	17	1
Wellington Phoenix	2023–24	A-League	11	0	—		11	0
Sydney Olympic	2024	NPL NSW	12	1	2	0	14	1
Wellington Phoenix	2024–25	A-League	22	0	—		22	0
Wellington Phoenix	2025–26	A-League	6	0	—		6	0
Wellington Phoenix	Total		28	0	0	0	28	0
Western Sydney Wanderers	2026–27	A-League	3	0	—		3	0
Career total			155	3	5	0	160	3

=== International ===
As of match played 19 July 2025

Appearances and goals by national team and year
National team	Year	Apps	Goals
Lebanon	2025	10	0
Total		10	0

== Honours ==
Sydney University

- National Premier Leagues NSW Women's Premiership: 2020

== See also ==
- List of Lebanon women's international footballers
