= Alyssa Whinham =

New Zealand footballer (born 2003)

Personal information
- Full name: Alyssa Maree Whinham
- Date of birth: 26 October 2003 (age 23)
- Height: 1.62 m (5 ft 4 in)
- Position: Midfielder

Team information
- Current team: Wellington Phoenix
- Number: 10

Youth career
- 2021: Wellington Phoenix Academy

Senior career*
Years	Team	Apps	(Gls)
2020	Canterbury United Pride		
2021	Coastal Spirit		
2021–	Wellington Phoenix	62	(3)
2023	Coastal Spirit	3	(1)

International career^{‡}
2022	New Zealand U20	3	(0)
- * Club domestic league appearances and goals as of 11 March 2026 ‡ National team caps and goals as of 11 March 2026

Alyssa Maree Whinham (born 26 October 2003) is a New Zealand professional footballer who plays as a midfielder for the Wellington Phoenix of the A-League Women. She previously played for New Zealand Women's National League (NZWNL) club Canterbury United Pride and Canterbury Women's Premiership League club Coastal Spirit. Whinham represented the New Zealand under-20 national team, in 2022.

== Early life ==
Whinham was born on 26 October 2003 and is from Canterbury, New Zealand.

== Club career ==
=== Canterbury United Pride ===
In 2020, Whinham played for Canterbury United Pride of the New Zealand Women's National League (NZWNL). She formed part of the squad that won a third consecutive national league title that year, alongside future Phoenix teammates Kate Taylor and Zoe McMeeken.

=== Coastal Spirit ===
In 2021, Whinham played for Coastal Spirit in the Canterbury Women's Premiership League (WPL), where she formed part of the team which won the premiership and the Reta Fitzpatrick Cup. Coastal Spirit won all 15 of their matches in the WPL.

=== Wellington Phoenix ===
In 2021, the Wellington Phoenix signed Whinham on a scholarship contract to form part of the Phoenix's inaugural season in the A-League Women. Whinham made her debut as a substitute in the club's first match, on 3 December 2021 against Western Sydney Wanderers. After featuring in the first four matches she received an automatic contract upgrade from scholarship to a full contract. She featured in all 14 of the Phoenix's matches that season. Whinham scored her first goal for the Phoenix on 16 January 2022 in a 3–2 defeat against Brisbane Roar.

On 18 July 2022, Whinham re-signed with the Phoenix for 2 years. She would go on to make 8 appearances in the 2022–23 season.

Whinham made 16 appearances in the 2023–24 season and on 11 July 2024 she signed a new 2-year deal with the club.

During the 2024–25 season, she made 22 appearances. On 9 January 2025, Whinham scored a 35-metre goal only seven seconds into the second half in a 3–0 win against the Western Sydney Wanderers.

On 19 January 2025, Whinham made her 50th appearance for the Wellington Phoenix.

Two matches into the 2025–26 season, Whinham suffered an anterior cruciate ligament (ACL) injury, sidelining her for the rest of the season.

== International career ==
=== New Zealand U20 ===
On 26 July 2022, Whinham was named as part of the 21-woman Junior Football Ferns squad for the 2022 FIFA U-20 Women's World Cup in Costa Rica. She played in all three of New Zealand's matches, with the team exiting the tournament at the group stage following two draws and one defeat.

=== New Zealand ===
On 28 September 2022, Football Ferns head coach Jitka Klimkova named Whinham as part of the 24-player squad ahead of a friendly match against Japan the following month. However, Whinham would not feature in the match.

== Honours ==
Canterbury United Pride

- New Zealand Women's National League: 2020.

Coastal Spirit

- Canterbury Women's Premiership League: 2021.
- Reta Fitzpatrick Cup: 2021.
