= Helena Errington =

New Zealand footballer (born 2005)

Personal information
- Full name: Helena Maree Errington
- Date of birth: July 31, 2005 (age 21)
- Place of birth: Wellington, New Zealand
- Height: 1.64 m (5 ft 5 in)
- Position: Midfielder

Team information
- Current team: FH
- Number: 16

Youth career
- Waterside Karori
- Western Suburbs FC
- Wellington Phoenix Academy

Senior career*
Years	Team	Apps	(Gls)
2023–2024	Sporting CP	0	(0)
2023–2024	Wellington Phoenix	5	(0)
2025–	Sporting JAX	0	(0)
2026–	→ FH	21	(7)

International career^{‡}
2022	New Zealand U17	3	(0)
2023–2024	New Zealand U20	6	(2)
- * Club domestic league appearances and goals as of 8 August 2026 ‡ National team caps and goals as of 1 September 2024

Helena Maree Errington (born 31 July 2005) is a New Zealand professional footballer who plays as a midfielder who plays for Besta deild kvenna club Fimleikafélag Hafnarfjarðar, on loan from Sporting JAX of the USL Super League. She previously played for Wellington Phoenix in the A-League Women and has represented New Zealand at under-17 and under-20 levels.

== Early life and youth career ==
Errington grew up in Wellington, New Zealand. She played youth football for Waterside Karori and Western Suburbs FC before joining the Wellington Phoenix Academy.

== Club career ==
=== Sporting CP ===
Following her performance at the 2023 OFC U-19 Women's Championship, she signed with Sporting CP of the Campeonato Nacional Feminino. She trained with the starters, but played with the reserves. The club plays in Lisbon, Portugal.

=== Wellington Phoenix ===
Errington joined Wellington Phoenix on a scholarship contract in December 2023. She made five appearances in the 2023–24 A-League Women season.

=== Sporting JAX ===
On 1 July 2025, Sporting JAX of the USL Super League announced Errington as one of seven new signings for their inaugural season. The team plays in Jacksonville, Florida.

=== FH ===
On 24 March 2026, Fimleikafélag Hafnarfjarðar of Iceland's Besta deild kvenna, announced via the club's Instagram, that they had acquired Errington on loan from Sporting JAX. Errington registered a goal and four assists in a game on the 4th of October in a standout performance for FH.

== International career ==
=== Youth ===
She was a standout at the 2023 OFC U-19 Women's Championship, scoring two goals and helping New Zealand win the title. Her performances earned her the Golden Ball as the tournament's best player.

=== Senior ===
On 22 September 2026, Errington was called up to the senior Football Ferns team for the first time, alongside Daisy Brazendale, for the friendly matches against Panama on 10 and 13 October 2026. However, the two-match series was cancelled due to the 2026 Panama earthquake.

== Honours ==
- OFC U‑19 Women’s Championship: 2023
- Golden Ball (Player of the Tournament): 2023 OFC U-19 Championship
