= Manaia Elliott =

New Zealand footballer

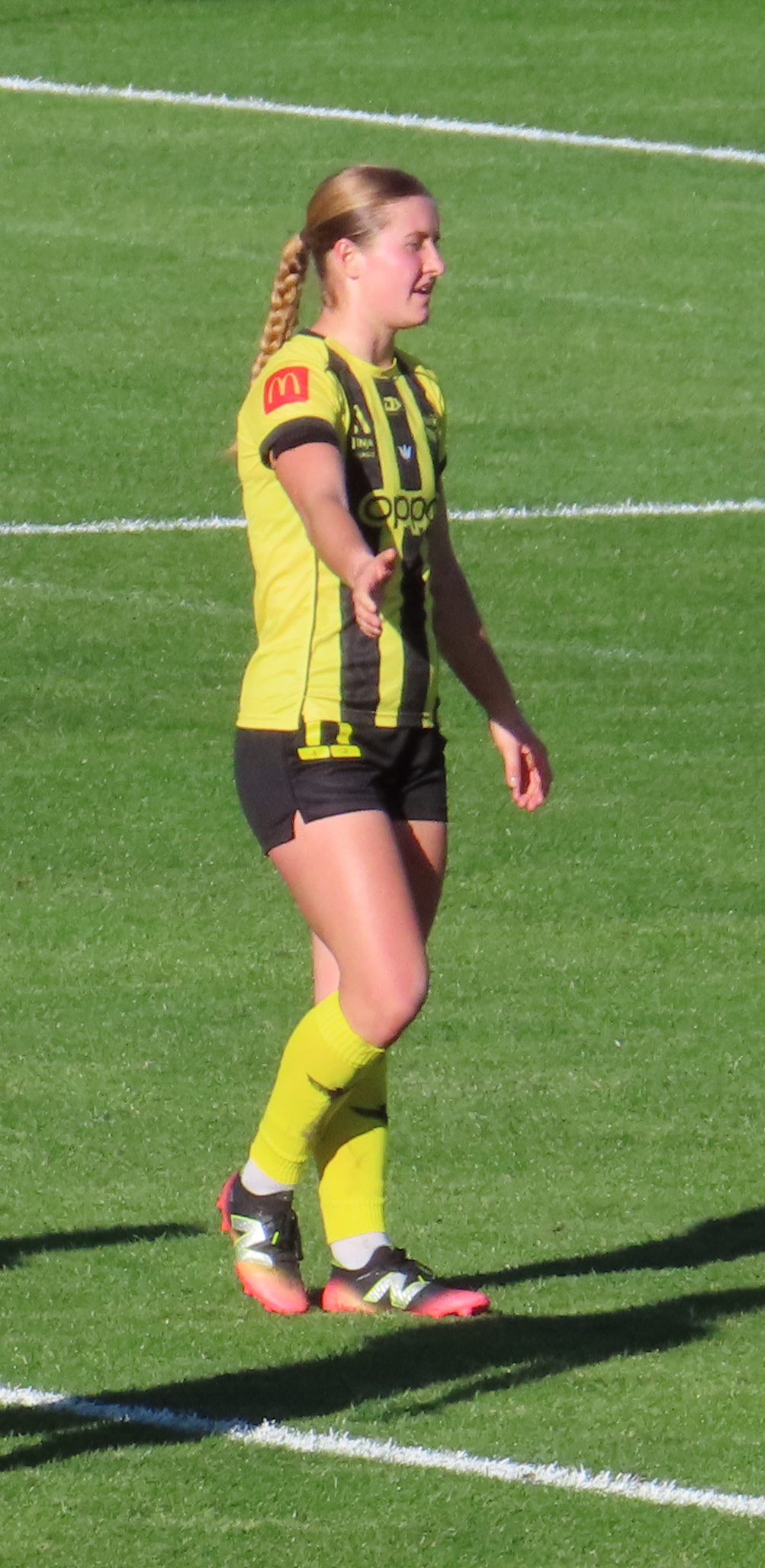
- Elliott playing for the Wellington Phoenix in 2026.

Personal information
- Full name: Manaia Poppy Elliott
- Date of birth: 21 April 2005 (age 21)
- Height: 1.65 m (5 ft 5 in)
- Position: Defender

Team information
- Current team: Wellington Phoenix
- Number: 11

Youth career
- –2022: Melville United
- 2022–2023: Wellington Phoenix

Senior career*
Years	Team	Apps	(Gls)
2023–	Wellington Phoenix	62	(8)

International career^{‡}
2022	New Zealand U17	3	(0)
2022–2024	New Zealand U19	2	(3)
2024–2025	New Zealand U20	3	(1)
2023–	New Zealand	9	(2)
Medal record
Football
Representing New Zealand
OFC U-19 Women's Championship
Winner	2023 Fiji
- * Club domestic league appearances and goals as of 23 May 2026. ‡ National team caps and goals as of 23 May 2026.

Manaia Poppy Elliott (Māori: [ma.na.ia]; born 21 April 2005) is a New Zealand professional footballer who plays as a defender for A-League Women club Wellington Phoenix and for the New Zealand national team.

== Early life ==
Elliott was born on 21 April 2005.

In her youth years, she played for Hamilton-based club Melville United before moving to Wellington to play for Wellington Phoenix's academy.

== Club career ==
=== Wellington Phoenix ===
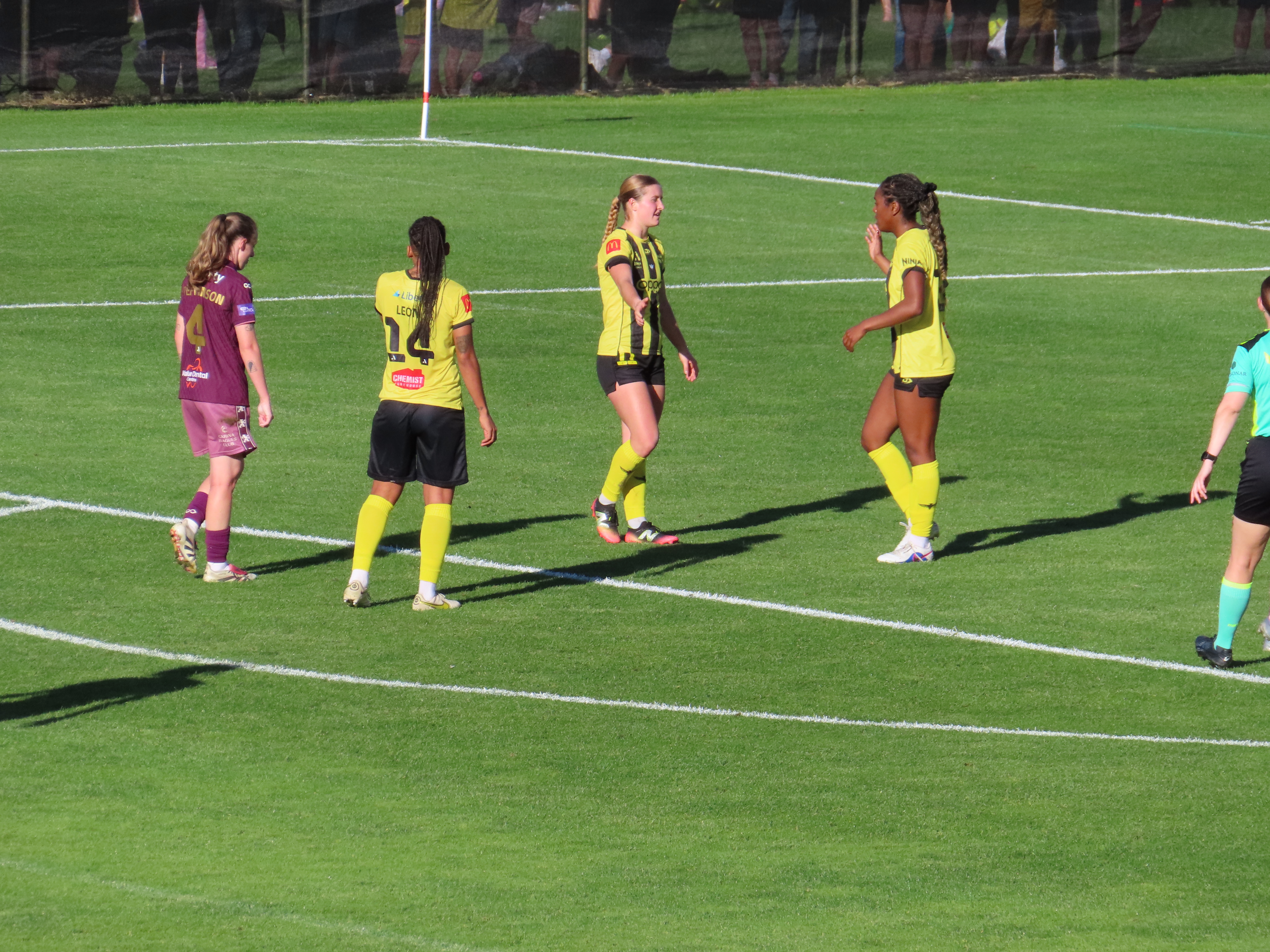
Elliott playing for the Wellington Phoenix FC in 2026 alongside Makala Woods and Lucia Leon.

An academy graduate, Elliott was one of Wellington Phoenix's four scholarship players for the 2023–24 A-League Women season.

Elliott scored her first A-League goal in the 87th minute of a 3–0 away win over Western Sydney Wanderers on 22 October 2023. Having come off the bench as a substitute, she also assisted in this game.

In May 2025, Elliot was awarded the best U-23 player award for the Wellington Phoenix alongside Corban Piper.

On 25 January 2026, Elliott made her 50th appearance for the Phoenix. She made an assist in a 3–1 home win against Adelaide United at Jerry Collins Stadium, Porirua.

== International career ==
=== New Zealand U-17 ===
Elliott was selected as part of the 21-player squad for the 2022 FIFA U-17 Women's World Cup held in India. She captained the team and started in all three matches in the group stage. The Young Football Ferns would exit the tournament at the conclusion of the group stage.

=== New Zealand U-19 and U-20 ===
Elliott was selected as part of the Junior Football Ferns squad for the 2023 OFC U-19 Women's Championship held in Fiji. She made two appearances and scored three goals. New Zealand would go on to win the championship by defeating Fiji 7–0 in the final on 8 July 2023.

In August 2024, Elliott was named as one of 21 players selected for the 2024 FIFA U-20 Women's World Cup in Colombia. She made three appearances and scored one goal. Her goal was against Ghana in a 3–1 defeat. New Zealand lost all matches and exited at the group stage.

=== New Zealand ===
Elliott was named as part of the senior Football Ferns squad for the first time in February 2025. She made her debut against Costa Rica on 23 February 2025, after being substituted in for Macey Fraser. On 27 February 2026, Elliott scored two goals against Samoa in an 8–0 win for the Football Ferns as part of the 2027 FIFA Women's World Cup qualification (OFC) campaign.

== International goals ==
No.	Date	Venue	Opponent	Score	Result	Competition
1.	27 February 2026	National Stadium, Honiara, Solomon Islands	Samoa	6–0	8–0	2027 FIFA Women's World Cup qualification
2.	27 February 2026	National Stadium, Honiara, Solomon Islands	Samoa	7–0	8–0	2027 FIFA Women's World Cup qualification

== Honours ==
New Zealand U-19

- OFC U-19 Women's Championship: 2023.
