= Macey Fraser =

New Zealand footballer (born 2002)

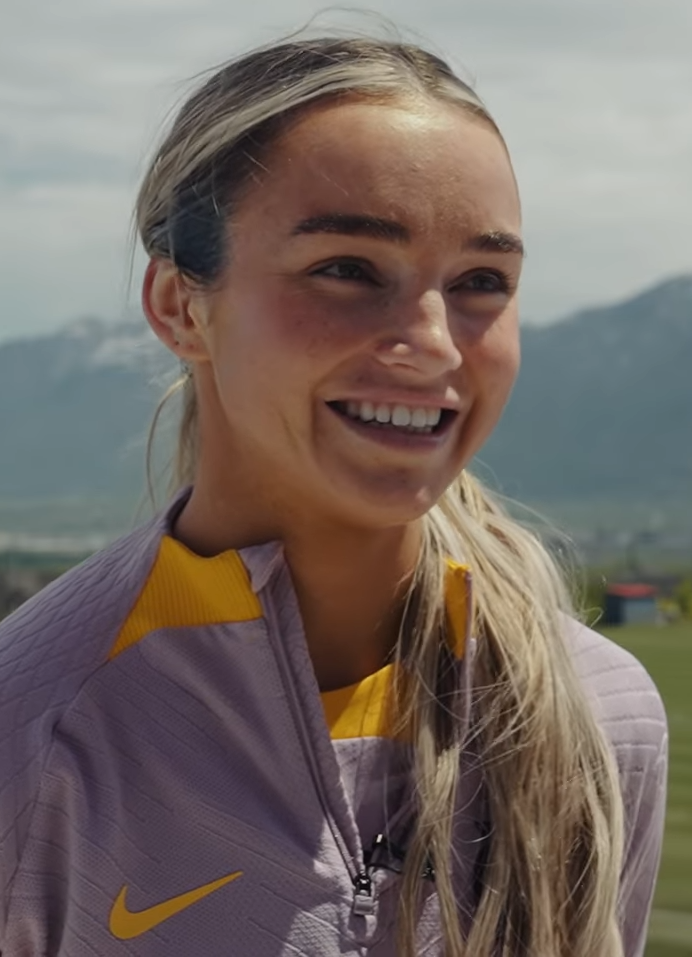
- Fraser with the Utah Royals in 2024

Personal information
- Full name: Macey Leigh Fraser
- Date of birth: 11 July 2002 (age 24)
- Place of birth: Rangiora, New Zealand
- Height: 1.64 m (5 ft 5 in)
- Position: Midfielder

Youth career
- –2021: Waimakariri United
- 2021–2023: Wellington Phoenix

Senior career*
Years	Team	Apps	(Gls)
2023–2024	Wellington Phoenix	19	(3)
2024–2025	Utah Royals	9	(0)
2025–2026	Wellington Phoenix	7	(1)

International career^{‡}
2017–2018	New Zealand U17	9	(1)
2022	New Zealand U20	1	(0)
2023–	New Zealand	5	(2)
- * Club domestic league appearances and goals as of 23 May 2026 ‡ National team caps and goals as of 9 April 2024

Macey Leigh Fraser (born 11 July 2002) is a New Zealand footballer who plays as a midfielder for the New Zealand national team.

== Club career ==
Fraser played for local club Waimakariri United before joining the Wellington Phoenix Academy. Fraser also played for the New Zealand Secondary Schools side, touring Sydney in Australia in 2016, and the Dallas International Cup in Texas in 2019.

=== Wellington Phoenix ===
After signing for the Wellington Phoenix Academy in 2021, Fraser signed her first professional contract on 16 August 2023. This was a three-year deal which is the longest deal in the history of the club. Fraser made her debut on 15 October 2023 in a 1–0 defeat to Melbourne City. In the following game, Fraser scored her first goal for the club as the Nix beat Western Sydney Wanderers 3–0. Fraser was named in the A-League Women Team of the Season for the 2023–24 A-League Women.

=== Utah Royals ===
Fraser signed with Utah Royals on 16 April 2024, for a record A-League Women transfer fee. Fraser made her debut on 25 May 2024 in a 1–0 defeat to the Kansas City Current in the NWSL. In September 2025, Fraser departed from Utah on a mutual contract termination.

=== Return to Wellington Phoenix ===
In September 2025, it was announced that Fraser returned to the Wellington Phoenix ahead of the 2025–26 A-League Women season, signing a three-year contract. Fraser made her return to the Phoenix on 14 March 2026 against Brisbane Roar in a 3–0 win. On 25 March, in her second match since her return, Fraser scored a free kick from 20 metres in a 2–1 defeat against the Central Coast Mariners at Polytec Stadium, Gosford, Australia.

On 12 August 2026, it was announced that Fraser and Wellington Phoenix had mutually agreed to terminate the remainder of her contract. During her return to the club, Fraser made seven substitute appearances and scored one goal.

== International career ==
Fraser was selected for the New Zealand U17 squad for the 2017 OFC U-16 Women's Championship. She made her debut in the opening game as they beat Tahiti U17 17–1. Fraser scored her only goal of the tournament in the third game, as New Zealand beat Samoa U17 8–0. New Zealand went on to win the tournament and qualify for the 2018 FIFA U-17 Women's World Cup in Uruguay. Fraser was named in the squad that travelled to Uruguay as New Zealand made history by becoming the first New Zealand football side to ever win a medal at a FIFA tournament.

Fraser made one appearance for the New Zealand U20 side, a 1–0 defeat to Australia U20 behind closed doors.

In February 2024, Fraser was called up to the New Zealand senior side for the first time for the 2024 Women's Olympic Football Tournament – Oceania Qualifier. She made her debut in the opening game, as New Zealand beat Tonga 3–0. In the following game Fraser scored her first senior international goal as New Zealand beat Samoa 6–0.

On 4 July 2024, Fraser was called up to the New Zealand Squad for the 2024 Summer Olympics.

== Personal life ==
Fraser was born in 2002 in Rangiora, New Zealand, where she attended Rangiora High School. She is the daughter of Pam Fraser and Gordon Fraser. She has two older brothers.

== Career statistics ==
=== Club ===
As of match played on 16 May 2026.

Appearances and goals by club, season and competition
Club	Season	League			Cup		Others		Total	
Club	Season	Division	Apps	Goals	Apps	Goals	Apps	Goals	Apps	Goals
Wellington Phoenix	2023–24	A-League Women	19	3	—		—		19	3
Utah Royals	2024	NWSL	4	0	—		0	0	4	0
Utah Royals	2025	NWSL	5	0	—		0	0	5	0
Utah Royals	Total		9	0	0	0	0	0	9	0
Wellington Phoenix	2025–26	A-League Women	7	1	—		—		7	1
Career total			35	4	—		0	0	35	4

=== International ===
As of match played on 9 April 2024.

Appearances and goals by national team and year
National team	Year	Apps	Goals
New Zealand	2024	5	2
Total		5	2

=== International goals ===
No.	Cap	Date	Venue	Opponent	Score	Result	Competition
1.	2	10 February 2024	FFS Football Stadium, Apia, Samoa	Samoa	4–0	6–0	2024 OFC Women's Olympic Qualifying Tournament
2.	3	13 February 2024	FFS Football Stadium, Apia, Samoa	Vanuatu	5–0	5–0	2024 OFC Women's Olympic Qualifying Tournament

== Honours ==
Individual

- Mainland Football Women's Youth of the Year: 2017
- A-League Women Team of the Season: 2023–24
