= Hailey Davidson =

American soccer player (born 2000)

Personal information
- Full name: Hailey Catherine Davidson
- Date of birth: November 10, 2000 (age 25)
- Place of birth: Prosper, Texas, U.S.
- Height: 5 ft 4 in (1.63 m)
- Position: Defender

Youth career
- 2008–2017: FC Dallas

College career
Years	Team	Apps	(Gls)
2018–2019	Oklahoma Sooners	33	(4)
2020–2022	Pittsburgh Panthers	56	(0)

Senior career*
Years	Team	Apps	(Gls)
2023	Mallbackens IF	14	(0)
2023–2024	Wellington Phoenix FC	21	(0)
2024–2025	Dallas Trinity FC	0	(0)
- * Club domestic league appearances and goals as of February 8, 2025

Hailey Catherine Davidson (born November 10, 2000) is an American professional soccer player who plays as a defender. She most recently played for USL Super League club Dallas Trinity FC.

== Early life ==
Raised in Prosper, Texas, Davidson spent several years playing for the FC Dallas Youth Academy, participating in Nationals in 2015, 2016, and 2017. She was captain between 2017 and 2018. Davidson helped the team win the 2017 ECNL National Championship and two Texas Conference Championships. Additionally, Davidson was a two-time Market Training Invitee and played twice against the U.S. Soccer U15 Girls National Team.

Davidson also played for Prosper High School, leading the team to 26 wins in her junior year as well as a 5A regional finals appearance.

== College career ==
=== Oklahoma Sooners, 2018–2019 ===
In 2018, Davidson began her college soccer career at the University of Oklahoma. As a freshman, she started 13 games for the Sooners. In her sophomore year, Davidson made 20 appearances, further establishing herself as a key player for the team.

=== Pittsburgh Panthers, 2020–2022 ===
In 2020, Davidson transferred to the University of Pittsburgh and instantly became a regular starter in the Panthers' backfield.

In her final season with the Panthers in 2022, Davidson played a pivotal role in the most successful campaign in program history. She helped lead the team to a record 14 wins and secured their first-ever appearances in both the ACC Tournament and the NCAA Tournament. The Panthers advanced to the Round of 16 before falling to Florida State.

== Club career ==
=== Mallbackens IF ===
Davidson went undrafted in the 2023 NWSL Draft. She joined the Houston Dash for pre-season camp but she did not make the final roster. Afterwards, Davidson joined Mallbacken of the Swedish Elitettan on March 10, 2023. She made her professional debut as a starter a few weeks later against Eskilstuna United on March 31, 2023.

=== Wellington Phoenix FC ===
In August 2023, Davidson signed a one-year contract with Wellington Phoenix FC for the 2023–24 season, becoming the second American player to join the club after Hope Breslin. She made her club debut on October 15, 2023, against Melbourne City playing 90 minutes.

She made an immediate impact, helping Wellington secure four victories in their first six matches, surpassing their win total from the previous season and achieving their best league finish to date.

=== Dallas Trinity FC ===
On June 3, 2024, Davidson became the second player to sign with the newly established Dallas Trinity FC, joining the club after Amber Brooks. She made her club debut in a friendly match against Barcelona on August 30, 2024.

On January 29, 2025, Davidson posted on Instagram that she had left the club by mutual consent.

== Style of play ==
Pitt Assistant Head Coach Ben Waldrum is quoted as saying: “Hailey is the definition of a competitor. She has a passion for the game and puts the extra time into making her game better."

== Personal life ==
Davidson earned a Bachelor of Arts in health services from the University of Pittsburgh in 2021. She then pursued a master's degree in health informatics, which she completed in 2022 from the University of Pittsburgh.

== Career statistics ==
=== College ===
College	Regular Season				Conference Championship		NCAA Tournament		Total	
College	Conference	Season	Apps	Goals	Apps	Goals	Apps	Goals	Apps	Goals
Oklahoma Sooners	Big 12	2018	17	4	1	0	—		18	4
Oklahoma Sooners	Big 12	2019	19	0	1	0	—		20	0
Oklahoma Sooners	Total		36	4	2	0	0	0	38	4
Pittsburgh Panthers	ACC	2020	16	0	—		—		16	0
Pittsburgh Panthers	ACC	2021	18	0	—		—		18	0
Pittsburgh Panthers	ACC	2022	18	0	1	0	3	0	22	0
Pittsburgh Panthers	Total		52	0	1	0	3	0	56	0
Career total			88	4	3	0	3	0	94	4

=== Club ===
As of February 8, 2025

Club	Season	League			League Cup		Other		Total	
Club	Season	Division	Apps	Goals	Apps	Goals	Apps	Goals	Apps	Goals
Mallbackens IF	2023	Elitettan	14	0	0	0	0	0	14	0
Wellington Phoenix FC	2023–24	A-League	21	0	0	0	0	0	21	0
Dallas Trinity FC	2024–25	USL Super League	0	0	0	0	1	0	1	0
Career total			35	0	0	0	1	0	36	0
