= Emma Taylor-Main =

New Zealand footballer (born 1999)

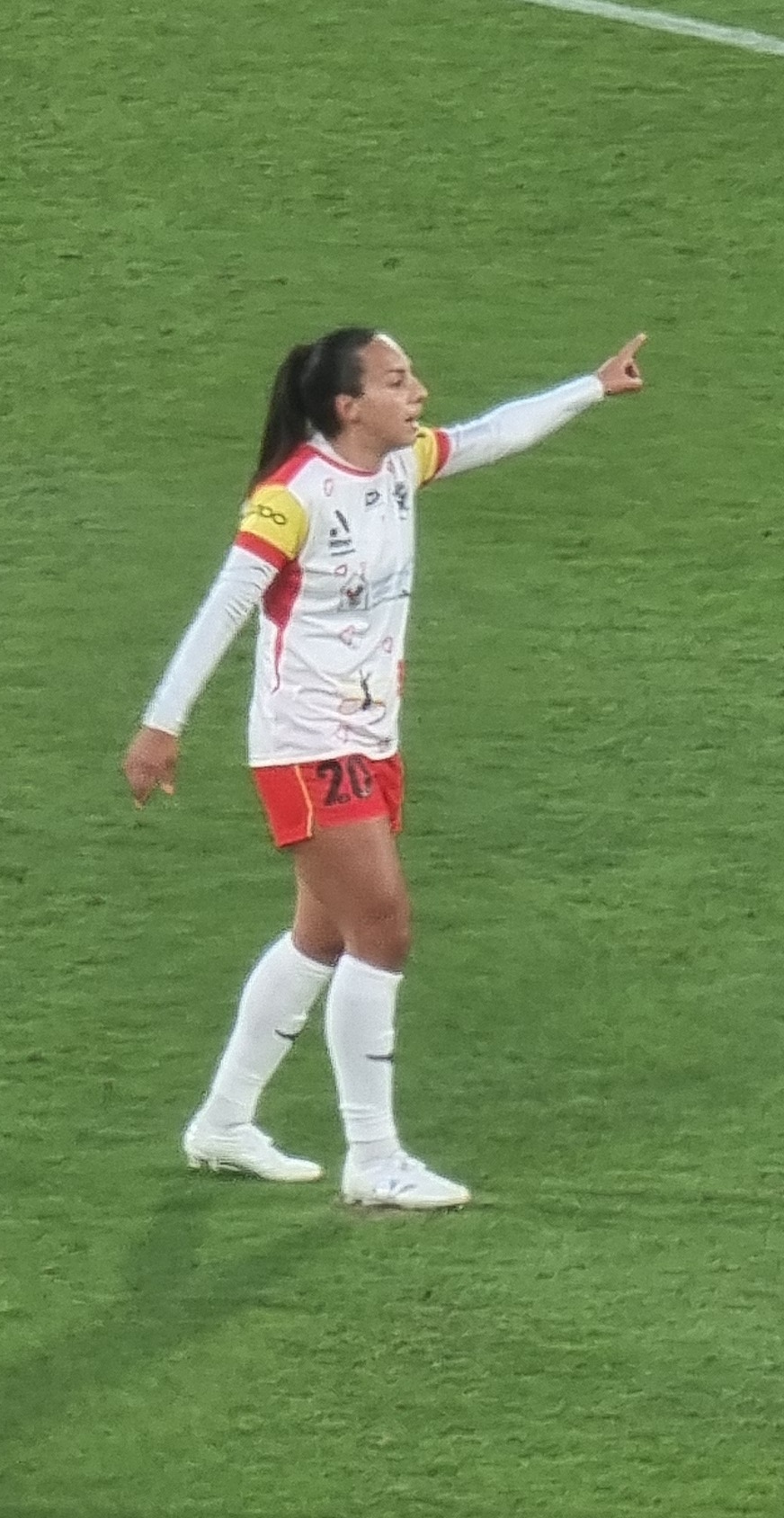
- Taylor-Main playing for Wellington Phoenix in 2026.

Personal information
- Full name: Emma Kalan Taylor-Main
- Birth name: Emma Kalan Main
- Date of birth: 19 October 1999 (age 27)
- Place of birth: Wellington, New Zealand
- Height: 1.73 m (5 ft 8 in)
- Positions: Striker; winger

Team information
- Current team: Wellington Phoenix
- Number: 20

Youth career
- –2023: Upper Hutt City FC

Senior career*
Years	Team	Apps	(Gls)
2023–	Wellington Phoenix	54	(10)

International career^{‡}
2016	New Zealand U-17	2	(0)
- * Club domestic league appearances and goals as of 13 April 2026 ‡ National team caps and goals as of 14 March 2026

Emma Kalan Taylor-Main (née Main; born 19 October 1999) is a New Zealand professional footballer who currently plays for the A-League side Wellington Phoenix. Taylor-Main played internationally for the New Zealand under-17 team.

== Youth career ==
Born and raised in the capital of New Zealand, Wellington, Taylor-Main played all of her junior football for local side Upper Hutt City FC. Taylor-Main joined the club at four years old, and made her debut for the first team aged just 14.

== Senior career ==
=== Wellington Phoenix ===
==== 2022–23 ====
Taylor-Main was signed as an injury replacement for the final week of the 2022–23 A-League Women season. She made her debut for the Wellington Phoenix on the 28th of March against Adelaide United after coming on as a substitute. On her debut, Taylor-Main provided an assist.

==== 2023–24 ====
On 13 June 2023, the Phoenix announced that the attacker had signed a one-year contract with the club ahead of the 2023–24 season. In that season, Taylor-Main found the net on five occasions, including a brace against Western Sydney Wanderers. Those goals meant that Taylor-Main ended the season as the Phoenix's second top goal scorer, behind only Mariana Speckmaier.

==== 2024–25 ====
Ahead of the 2024–25 A-League season, Taylor-Main signed a contract that would keep her on at the club until the conclusion of the season. Taylor-Main would go on to score three goals that season, taking her overall tally for the Wellington Phoenix to eight.

==== 2025–26 ====
On 4 July 2025, Taylor-Main signed another contract extension with the Phoenix, this time through to the end of the 2026–27 A-League season. She became the first Phoenix player to do so. Taylor-Main's first goal involvement of the 2025–26 season an assist for Grace Jale's second goal in the 7–0 victory over Sydney FC on the 20 December 2025. Next match, Taylor-Main scored her first and second goal of the season through a brace in a 3–0 win over Western Sydney Wanderers. The second of her two goals sent Taylor-Main's tally for the club up to 10, making her the equal top goal scorer in the history of the Phoenix, alongside Mariana Speckmaier, and Grace Jale.

On 3 January 2026, Taylor-Main brought up her 50th cap for the club after starting against the Brisbane Roar. She became just the fourth player to reach the milestone for the Phoenix.

On 13 April, the club announced Taylor-Main was set to miss the rest of the season due to a chronic lumbar spine injury, excluding her from the club's first ever appearance in the A-League Women Finals.

== International career ==
Taylor-Main was selected in the New Zealand U-17 squad to compete in the 2016 FIFA U-17 Women's World Cup held in Jordan. Taylor-Main started the last two group matches, including a 5–0 victory over the hosts.
