= Grace Jale =

New Zealand association football player

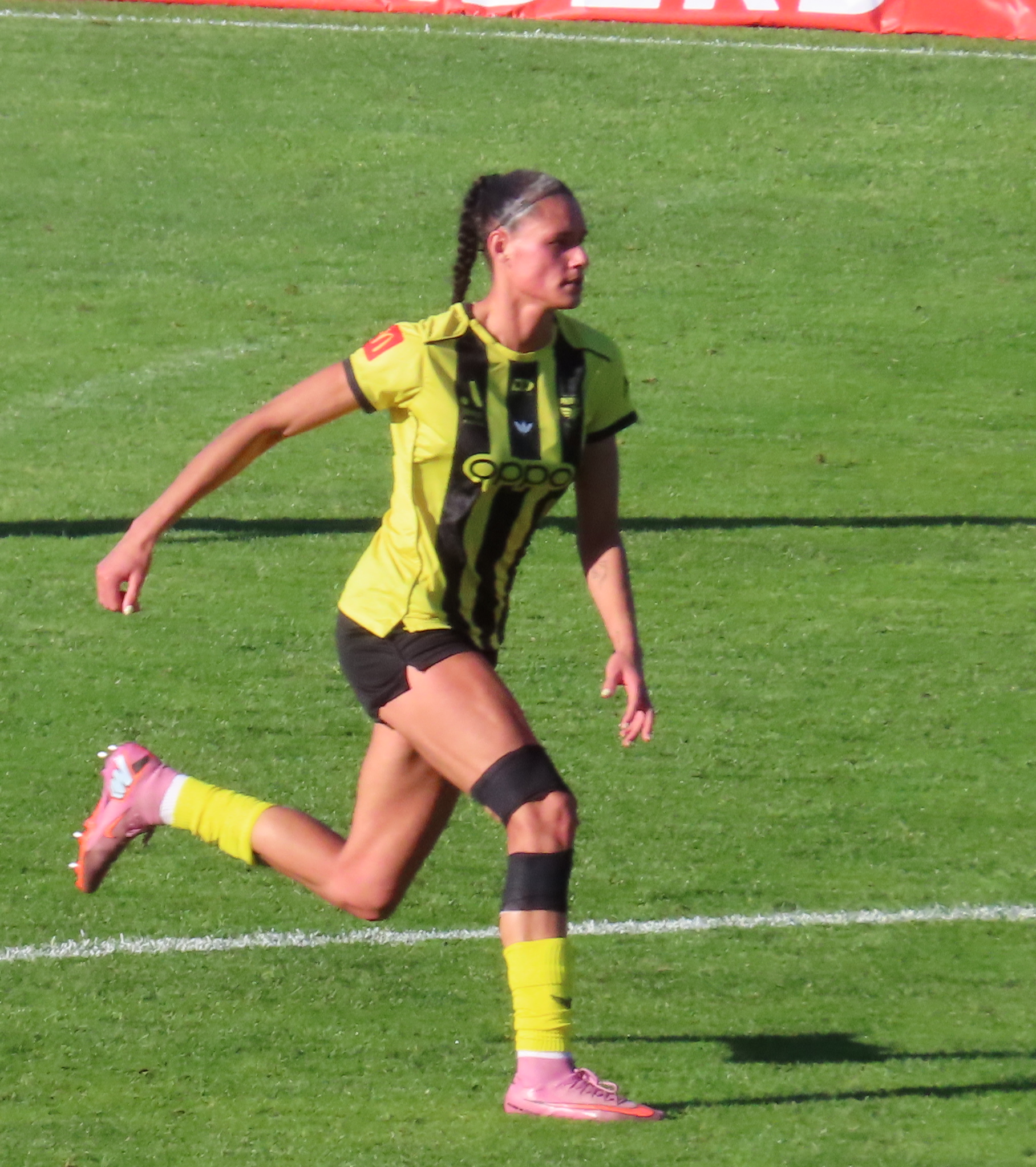
- Jale playing for the Wellington Phoenix in 2026.

Personal information
- Full name: Grace Joana Ella Jale
- Date of birth: 10 April 1999 (age 27)
- Place of birth: Auckland, New Zealand
- Height: 1.78 m (5 ft 10 in)
- Position: Forward

Team information
- Current team: Wellington Phoenix
- Number: 7

College career
Years	Team	Apps	(Gls)
2019	Wake Forest Demon Deacons	6	(0)

Senior career*
Years	Team	Apps	(Gls)
2021–2022	Wellington Phoenix	12	(6)
2022–2023	Canberra United	17	(3)
2023–2024	Perth Glory	19	(3)
2024–	Wellington Phoenix	43	(5)

International career^{‡}
2016	New Zealand U-17	3	(0)
2016	New Zealand U-20	6	(0)
2018–	New Zealand	37	(10)
- * Club domestic league appearances and goals as of 23 May 2026 ‡ National team caps and goals as of 3 March 2026

Grace Joana Ella Jale (Fijian: [ndʒoana ndʒaːleː]; born 10 April 1999) is a New Zealand professional footballer who plays as a forward for Wellington Phoenix and the New Zealand national team. She has previously played for Perth Glory and Canberra United.

== Early life ==
Born and raised in Auckland to a Fijian father and New Zealand mother, Jale started playing football (soccer) at age 7. She attended Mt Albert Grammar School where she helped the team to a national First XI championship. She also played for the Eastern Suburbs premier women's team. During her first year playing for the Bay Olympic Club Team, she was named Player of the Year and was awarded a Variety Gold Heart Scholarship.

== College career ==
In August 2018, Jale was offered a contract with Czech first-division club AC Sparta Praha, but opted to attend and play for Wake Forest University in Winston-Salem, North Carolina in the United States. Jale made 6 appearances for the Wake Forest Demon Deacons in 2019.

== Club career ==
=== Wellington Phoenix ===
On 19 October 2021, Jale signed with the newly formed Wellington Phoenix team to play in their inaugural season of the 2021–22 A-League Women league. Jale scored 6 goals in 11 appearances in 2021–22, winning the golden boot award for the club that season.

=== Canberra United ===
In July 2022, following a successful season with Wellington Phoenix, Jale joined for Australian A-League Women club Canberra United on a two-year contract.

=== Perth Glory ===
In August 2023, Jale was signed by A-League Women club Perth Glory. At the end of the season she departed the club.

=== Return to the Wellington Phoenix ===
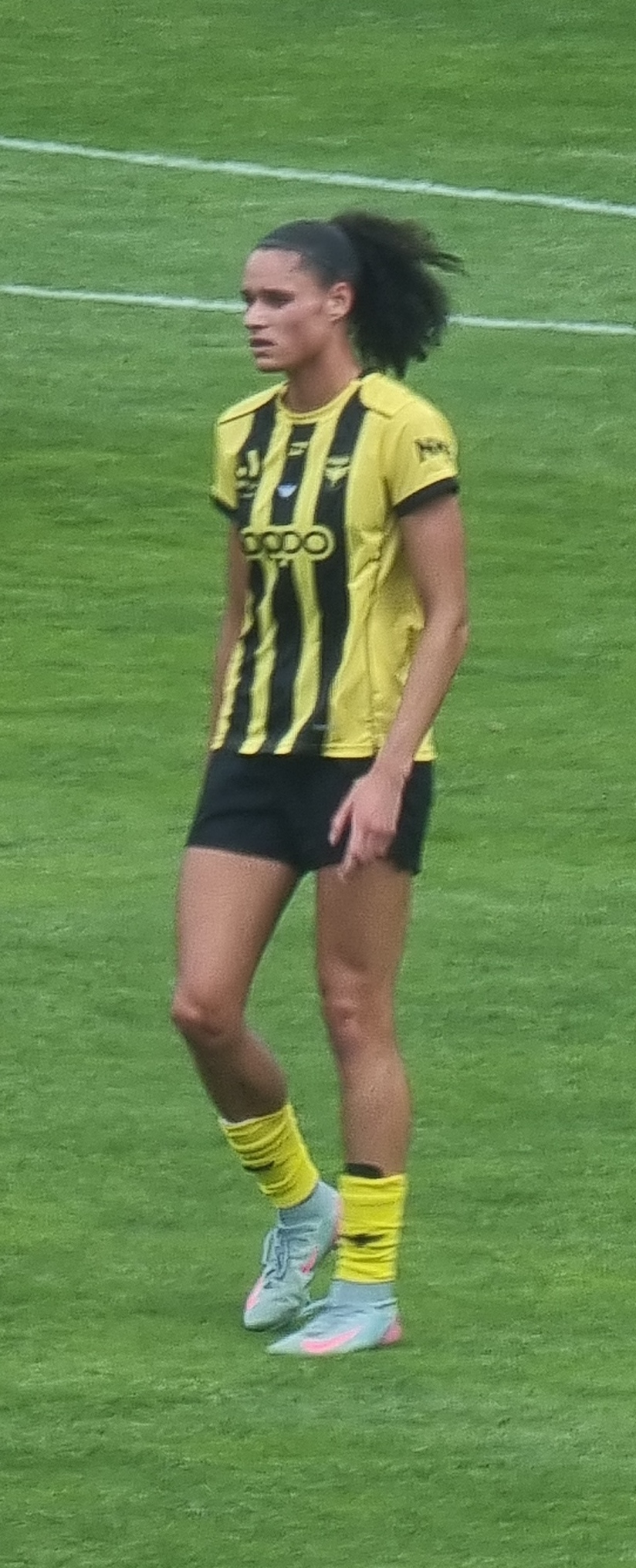
Jale playing for the Wellington Phoenix in 2026.

In August 2024, Jale returned to Wellington Phoenix. In the 2024–25 season, Jale made 21 appearances and scored 2 goals. During the 2025–26 regular season, Jale made 18 appearances and scored 2 goals. On 28 April 2026, the Wellington Phoenix held their annual end of season awards night, with Jale winning the Players' Player of the Year and the Women's Player of the Year awards.

On 29 April 2026, the Phoenix renewed her contract until the end of the 2026–27 season. On 3 May, Jale scored a goal two minutes into the match against Brisbane Roar, although Wellington would go on to lose 2–1 in the first leg of the A-League Women semifinals. This goal would mark her 11th goal for the Wellington Phoenix, making her the all-time leading scorer with 11 goals.

In the postseason, Jale was selected for the A-Leagues All Stars Women team that will play against Women's Super League (WSL) club Chelsea in the 2026 game at Allianz Stadium in Moore Park, Sydney as part of the 2026 Sydney Super Cup.

== International career ==
Jale made her debut for the senior national team and scored her first international goal during a match against Tonga at the 2018 OFC Women's Nations Cup. She previously represented New Zealand on the under-17 and under-20 national teams. She competed at the 2016 FIFA U-17 Women's World Cup in Jordan and 2016 FIFA U-20 Women's World Cup in Papua New Guinea.

=== 2023 FIFA Women's World Cup ===
In June 2023, Jale was selected as part of the 23 player Football Ferns squad for the 2023 FIFA Women's World Cup, which was co-hosted in Australia and New Zealand. She played two matches in the group stage.

=== 2024 Summer Olympics ===
On 4 July 2024, Jale was called up to the New Zealand squad for the 2024 Summer Olympics.

== International goals ==
No.	Date	Venue	Opponent	Score	Result	Competition
1.	19 November 2018	Stade Numa-Daly Magenta, Nouméa, New Caledonia	Tonga	11–0	11–0	2018 OFC Women's Nations Cup
2.	22 November 2018	Stade Numa-Daly Magenta, Nouméa, New Caledonia	Cook Islands	6–0	6–0	2018 OFC Women's Nations Cup
3.	7 February 2024	FFS Football Stadium, Apia, Samoa	Tonga	1–0	3–0	2024 OFC Women's Olympic Qualifying Tournament
4.	7 February 2024	FFS Football Stadium, Apia, Samoa	Tonga	3–0	3–0	2024 OFC Women's Olympic Qualifying Tournament
5.	16 February 2024	FFS Football Stadium, Apia, Samoa	Fiji	3–0	7–1	2024 OFC Women's Olympic Qualifying Tournament
6.	16 February 2024	FFS Football Stadium, Apia, Samoa	Fiji	6–0	7–1	2024 OFC Women's Olympic Qualifying Tournament
7.	16 February 2024	FFS Football Stadium, Apia, Samoa	Fiji	7–0	7–1	2024 OFC Women's Olympic Qualifying Tournament
8.	19 February 2024	FFS Football Stadium, Apia, Samoa	Solomon Islands	4–0	11–1	2024 OFC Women's Olympic Qualifying Tournament
9.	19 February 2024	FFS Football Stadium, Apia, Samoa	Solomon Islands	8–1	11–1	2024 OFC Women's Olympic Qualifying Tournament
10.	2 March 2026	National Stadium, Honiara, Solomon Islands	Solomon Islands	4–0	8–0	2027 FIFA Women's World Cup qualification
