= Amelia Abbott =

New Zealand association football player

Personal information
- Full name: Amelia Anne Abbott
- Date of birth: 22 July 2001 (age 25)
- Place of birth: Nelson, New Zealand
- Height: 1.68 m (5 ft 6 in)
- Position: Midfielder

Team information
- Current team: Wellington United

Youth career
- –2019: Nelson Suburbs
- –2019: Nelson College for Girls

College career
Years	Team	Apps	(Gls)
2020–2024	Texas Longhorns	10	(0)

Senior career*
Years	Team	Apps	(Gls)
2019–2021	Nelson Suburbs		
2020	Canterbury United Pride	12	
2024–2025	Wellington Phoenix	4	(0)
2025-	Wellington United	2	(2)

International career^{‡}
2018	New Zealand U-17	6	(1)
2019	New Zealand U-20	5	(2)
2021–	New Zealand	1	(0)
Medal record
FIFA U-17 Women's World Cup
Bronze medal – third place	2018 Uruguay	Tournament
- * Club domestic league appearances and goals as of 24 November 2025 ‡ National team caps and goals as of 24 October 2021

Amelia Anne Abbott (born 22 July 2001) is a New Zealand footballer who plays as a midfielder for Wellington United and for the New Zealand national team.

== Club career ==
Abbott played for Nelson Suburbs including the men's team as the only female in the competition.

In December 2024, Abbott joined A-League Women club Wellington Phoenix until the end of the 2024–25 A-League Women. She was not offered a contract at the end of the season and departed the club.

== International career ==
Abbott was part of the New Zealand U-17 team that won bronze at the 2018 FIFA U-17 Women's World Cup in Uruguay. She scored her only goal of the tournament, in the 1–1 quarter-final against Japan, which was nominated for goal of the tournament.

Abbott also played for the New Zealand U-20 team, winning the 2019 OFC U-19 Women's Championship in the Cook Islands which qualified them for the 2021 FIFA U-20 Women's World Cup before it was cancelled. She scored two goals in their record 30–0 win over Samoa.

She made her international debut for New Zealand in their 1–5 lost to Canada.

== Personal life ==
Abbott attended Nelson College for Girls where she earned the Rose Bowl Award for the Highest Achieving Athlete.

== Honours ==
=== Club ===
- Canterbury United Pride: National Women's League Winners: 2018 and 2020

=== International ===
- New Zealand U-17: 3rd place at the 2018 FIFA U-17 Women's World Cup
- New Zealand U-20: Winners at the 2019 OFC U-19 Women's Championship
