= Olivia Fergusson =

English footballer

Personal information
- Full name: Olivia Mary Fergusson
- Date of birth: 27 March 1995 (age 31)
- Place of birth: Burntwood, Staffordshire, England
- Position: Forward

Team information
- Current team: RCD Espanyol
- Number: 18

Youth career
- Aston Villa

Senior career*
Years	Team	Apps	(Gls)
2014–2015	Aston Villa	30	(6)
2016–2018	Bristol City	34	(3)
2018–2019	Yeovil Town	20	(1)
2019–2020	Sheffield United	14	(7)
2020–2021	Leicester City	8	(0)
2021–2022	Coventry United	20	(1)
2022–2023	Celtic	26	(3)
2023–2024	Wolverhampton Wanderers	33	(6)
2024–2025	Wellington Phoenix	22	(5)
2025–2026	RCD Espanyol	3	(0)
2026–	Durham	0	(0)

International career^{‡}
2012	England U17	6	(1)
- * Club domestic league appearances and goals as of 24 November 2025 ‡ National team caps and goals as of 31 August 2018

Olivia Mary Fergusson (born 27 March 1995) is an English professional footballer who plays as a forward for Durham.

== Club career ==
=== Aston Villa ===
Fergusson started her career at Aston Villa after graduating from the club's centre of excellence. Fergusson went on to score 8 goals in the 2015 for the club. She left following the expiration of her contract at the end of the 2015 season.

=== Bristol City ===
On 4 February 2016, it was announced that Ferguson had joined Bristol City. Fergusson made 6 appearances in her first season for Bristol. The following season, Fergusson made 12 league appearances did not score for her new club in a season where Bristol came 8th in the FA Women's Super League.

=== Yeovil Town ===
On 18 August 2018, it was announced that Fergusson ahad joined Yeovil Town. In the 2018–19 season, Fergusson played 20 games as well as scoring her only league goal for the club in a 2–1 defeat away to Manchester City on 28 April 2019.

=== Sheffield United ===
Following Yeovil's relegation to the third-tier, Fergusson joined Sheffield United on 11 July 2019. She scored 7 goals in the Championship as Sheffield United finished 2nd. She left at the conclusion of the 2019–20 season.

=== Leicester City ===
After departing Sheffield, Fergusson joined Leicester City. She left the club at the end of her contract in June 2021.

=== Coventry United ===
In July 2021, a week after leaving Leicester City, Fergusson joined Coventry United on a two-year deal.

=== Wolverhampton Wanderers ===
On 8 July 2023, Fergusson signed for Wolverhampton Wanderers, which she is also a lifelong fan of.

=== Wellington Phoenix ===
In August 2024, Fergusson left England to go overseas and signed with A-League Women club Wellington Phoenix. In July 2025, the club announced her departure after scoring five goals in 22 appearances and winning the club's golden boot.

On 29 July 2026, Fergusson was announced at Durham.

== International career ==
Fergusson has represented at U17 level for her country playing 6 times and scoring 1 goal. These games came in the qualifying for the 2012 UEFA European Under-17 Championship but England failed to get passed the elite round of qualifying.

Fergusson represented England at U23 level during a double header friendlies vs Norway and during the 2018 Nordic Cup in Sweden.

== Career statistics ==
=== Club ===
As of match played 23 February 2020

Appearances and goals by club, season and competition
Club	Season	League			FA Cup		League Cup		Total	
Club	Season	Division	Apps	Goals	Apps	Goals	Apps	Goals	Apps	Goals
Aston Villa	2014	WSL 2	13	1	1	0	4	0	18	1
Aston Villa	2015	WSL 2	17	5	2	1	3	1	22	7
Aston Villa	Total		30	6	3	1	7	1	40	8
Bristol City	2016	WSL 2	16	3	2	0	0	0	18	3
Bristol City	2017	WSL 1	6	0	—		—		6	0
Bristol City	2017–18	WSL 1	12	0	1	0	4	0	17	0
Bristol City	Total		34	3	3	0	4	0	41	3
Yeovil Town	2018–19	WSL	20	1	1	0	4	1	25	2
Sheffield United	2019–20	Championship	14	7	1	0	6	0	21	7
Career total			98	17	8	1	21	2	127	20
