= Mackenzie Barry =

New Zealand footballer (born 2001)

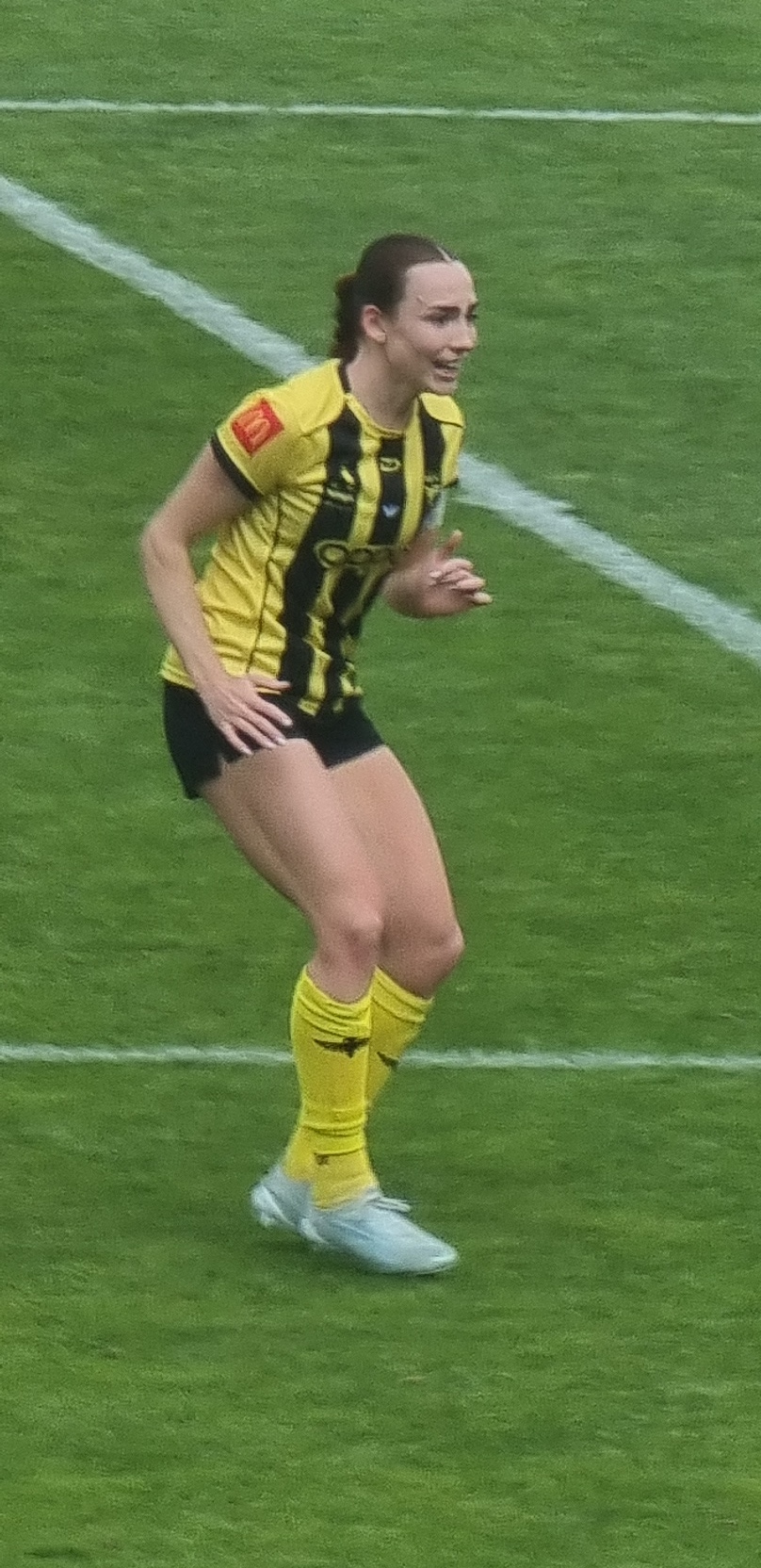
- Barry playing for Wellington Phoenix in 2026.

Personal information
- Full name: Mackenzie Dale Barry
- Date of birth: 11 April 2001 (age 25)
- Place of birth: New Plymouth, New Zealand
- Height: 1.71 m (5 ft 7 in)
- Position: Defender

Team information
- Current team: Wellington Phoenix
- Number: 4

Senior career*
Years	Team	Apps	(Gls)
2021–	Wellington Phoenix	94	(0)

International career^{‡}
2017–2018	New Zealand U-17	8	
2019	New Zealand U-20	5	(0)
2022–	New Zealand	24	(1)
Medal record
FIFA U-17 Women's World Cup
Bronze medal – third place	2018 Uruguay	Tournament
- * Club domestic league appearances and goals as of 23 May 2026. ‡ National team caps and goals as of 23 May 2026.

Mackenzie Dale Barry (born 11 April 2001) is a New Zealand footballer who plays as a defender for A-League Women club Wellington Phoenix FC and the New Zealand women's national football team.

== Club career ==
Mackenzie Barry was born on 11 April 2001 in New Plymouth, Taranaki and attended Central Primary School where she began playing football. Barry then attended and played for New Plymouth Girls' High School and represented Taranaki and CentralFootball Federation before being signed for Wellington Phoenix for their inaugural season in the A-League Women.

In the history of the women's Phoenix, Barry is the most capped player, with over 90 appearances. On 15 April 2026, the club confirmed Barry had re-signed for the 2026–27 season.

== International career ==
Barry was a member of the New Zealand squad in the FIFA U-17 Women's World Cup in Uruguay where New Zealand finished in 3rd place.

In 2019 Barry was part of the winning side at the 2019 OFC U-19 Women's Championship, earning qualification for the 2020 FIFA U-20 Women's World Cup scheduled to be held in Costa Rica, although that tournament was subsequently cancelled due to the COVID-19 pandemic.

Barry was first called up to the senior side for a Europe tour to play Norway and Wales and made her senior international debut on 19 October 2022 coming on as a substitute during a subsequent tour to Japan against the hosts, Japan winning that game 2–0.

On 4 July 2024, Barry was called up to the New Zealand squad for the 2024 Summer Olympics.

== International goals ==
No.	Date	Venue	Opponent	Score	Result	Competition
1.	25 July 2024	Stade Geoffroy-Guichard, Saint-Étienne, France	Canada	1–0	1–2	2024 Summer Olympics
