= Michaela Foster =

New Zealand association football player (born 1999)

Personal information
- Full name: Michaela Leigh Foster
- Date of birth: 9 January 1999 (age 27)
- Place of birth: Hamilton, New Zealand
- Height: 1.73 m (5 ft 8 in)
- Position: Left back

Team information
- Current team: Durham
- Number: 20

Youth career
- Claudelands Rovers
- Hamilton Wanderers

College career
Years	Team	Apps	(Gls)
2018–2021	San Diego Toreros	44	(6)

Senior career*
Years	Team	Apps	(Gls)
2022	Northern Rovers		
2022–2024	Wellington Phoenix	37	(2)
2024	Auckland United	0	(0)
2024–	Durham	39	(3)

International career^{‡}
2016	New Zealand U17	10	(2)
2017–2018	New Zealand U20	5	(3)
2023–	New Zealand	35	(2)
- * Club domestic league appearances and goals as of 23 May 2026. ‡ National team caps and goals as of 23 May 2026.

Michaela Leigh Foster (born 9 January 1999) is a New Zealand professional footballer who plays as a left-back for Women's Super League 2 club Durham and the New Zealand national team.

== Early and personal life ==
Michaela Leigh Foster is the daughter of Ian Foster, a former rugby union player who coached the All Blacks from 2020 to 2023. In November 2022, she got engaged to her girlfriend. She attended Hamilton Girls' High School, later working in its sports department while a National League player.

== Club career ==
Foster played college soccer at the University of San Diego in California for four years and, upon her return to New Zealand, worked different jobs while playing for Northern Rovers in the National League.

Though a recognised youth international, she did not play for a top-flight football team until she was 24, when she joined Wellington Phoenix in October 2022 ahead of the A-League Women season. She had been offered a scholarship position on the squad, with a lower wage; with good performances despite the team's poor results, and having played every minute for the team, she was given a full contract after four matches. Foster is considered the set-piece specialist of the team.

In June 2024, Foster joined Auckland United.

Having joined Women's Super League 2 side Durham in September 2024, Foster signed a new contract with the club in July 2025. She scored an olympico in Durham's 1–2 loss to Liverpool in October 2025 in the Women’s League Cup.

== International career ==
As a youth international, Foster captained New Zealand's under-17 and under-20 teams at their respective youth World Cups in 2016 and 2018. The under-17 coach said that while it can be hard to identify leaders in the youth levels, Foster stood out for her mana.

After her successful debut season in the A-League, Foster was called up to the senior New Zealand national team in February 2023, making her debut on 20 February 2023 in a friendly against Argentina. She had originally been included only as a training player unavailable for selection, but with injury to Rebekah Stott was added to the squad. On 30 June 2023, Foster was called up to the New Zealand squad for the 2023 FIFA Women's World Cup.

On 4 July 2024, Foster was called up to the New Zealand squad for the 2024 Summer Olympics.

== Career statistics ==
=== International ===
As of match played on 1 August 2024.

Appearances and goals by national team and year
National team	Year	Apps	Goals
New Zealand	2023	10	0
New Zealand	2024	12	1
Total		22	1

=== International goals ===
No.	Cap	Date	Venue	Opponent	Score	Result	Competition
1.	12	10 February 2024	FFS Football Stadium, Apia, Samoa	Samoa	6–0	6–0	2024 OFC Women's Olympic Qualifying Tournament
2.	34	11 April 2026	FMG Stadium Waikato, Hamilton, New Zealand	Fiji	3–0	5–0	2027 FIFA Women's World Cup qualification
