= Jerry Collins Stadium =

Sports venue in Porirua, New Zealand

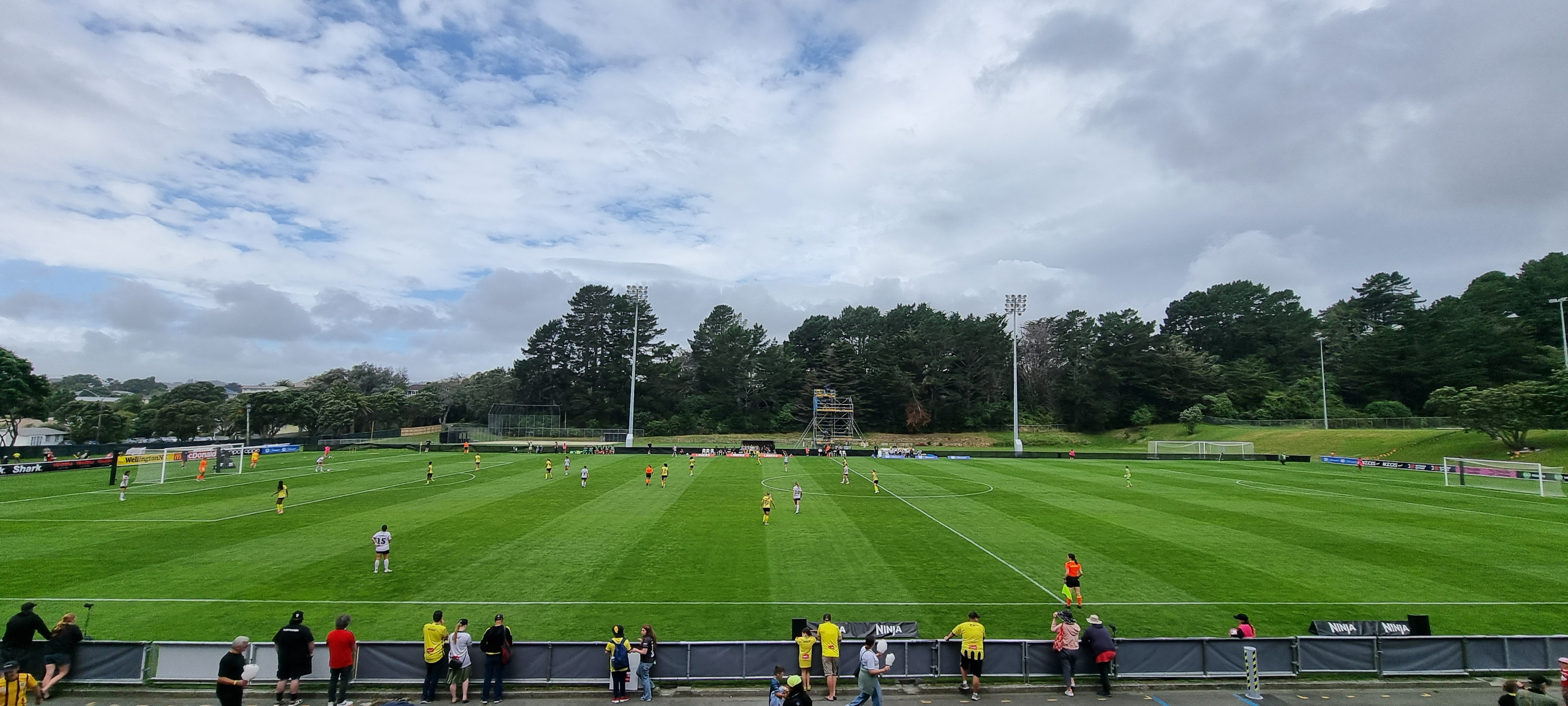
- Match between Wellington Phoenix and Adelaide United (A-League Women, 25 January 2026)
- Interactive map of Jerry Collins Stadium
- Former names: Porirua Park, Porirua Trust Stadium
- Location: Porirua, New Zealand
- Coordinates: 41°8′41″S 174°51′24″E
- Operator: Porirua City Council
- Capacity: 2000
- Surface: Grass

Tenants
- Northern United RFC; Team Wellington; Wellington Rugby League; Wellington Phoenix Women (2023 – present)

Jerry Collins Stadium is a multi-purpose sporting complex in Porirua, New Zealand. It currently serves as the home ground of rugby union club Northern United RFC and the Wellington Rugby League representative team, as well as the home for Wellington Phoenix Women of the A-League Women. Porirua Park also has a softball field located at the western end of the park.

Porirua Park Stadium was officially renamed Jerry Collins Stadium on 25 March 2016, in memory of the late All Black.

== Football ==
Jerry Collins Park served as the secondary home for Team Wellington in the New Zealand Football Championship (NZFC). As the primary home stadium Newtown Park also serves as the primary track and field complex in Wellington, clashes with athletics events often resulted in at least one match having been played in Porirua every season until the dissolution of the NZFC in 2021.

With expansion expected to occur for the 2010–11 season, a Porirua-based franchise had bid for inclusion, which would likely be based full-time at Porirua Park.

In recent years, Jerry Collins Stadium has become the home venue for the Wellington Phoenix Women's team, hosting several A-League Women's competition matches during the 2023/24 season. The stadium has also been used as a training ground for teams participating in the 2023 FIFA Women’s World Cup, further elevating its profile as a football venue.

JC Park continues to serve as the home for midweek preseason friendlies between professional club Wellington Phoenix FC and local amateur clubs.

JC Park has also hosted international football, with the New Zealand Under-23 team recording a historic 1–0 victory over the Chile Under-23 as part of preparations for the 2008 Beijing Olympics.

== Rugby league ==
During the 1988 Great Britain Lions tour the Wellington rugby league team defeated the Lions 24–18 at Porirua Park before a crowd of 4,428.

== Rugby union ==
Porirua Park is the home field for Wellington Rugby Football Union club Northern United RFC.

The ground also often hosts pre-season fixtures for the professional Wellington Lions and the Super Rugby's Hurricanes.
