= Wellington Phoenix FC (women) =

Association football club based in New Zealand

Wellington Phoenix Women
- Full name: Wellington Phoenix Women's Football Club
- Nicknames: Phoenix, Wahinix, Nix
- Short name: Wellington
- Founded: 10 September 2021; 5 years ago
- Ground: Jerry Collins Stadium, Porirua
- Capacity: 1,900
- Owner: Welnix
- Chairman: Robert Morrison
- Coach: Bev Priestman
- League: A-League Women
- 2025–26: 2nd of 11
- Website: https://www.wellingtonphoenix.com/
Home colours	Away colours	Third colours

Wellington Phoenix Women's Football Club is a professional women's football club based in Wellington, New Zealand. The Phoenix competes in the Australian premier women's soccer competition A-League Women, under licence from Football Federation Australia and New Zealand Football.

== History ==
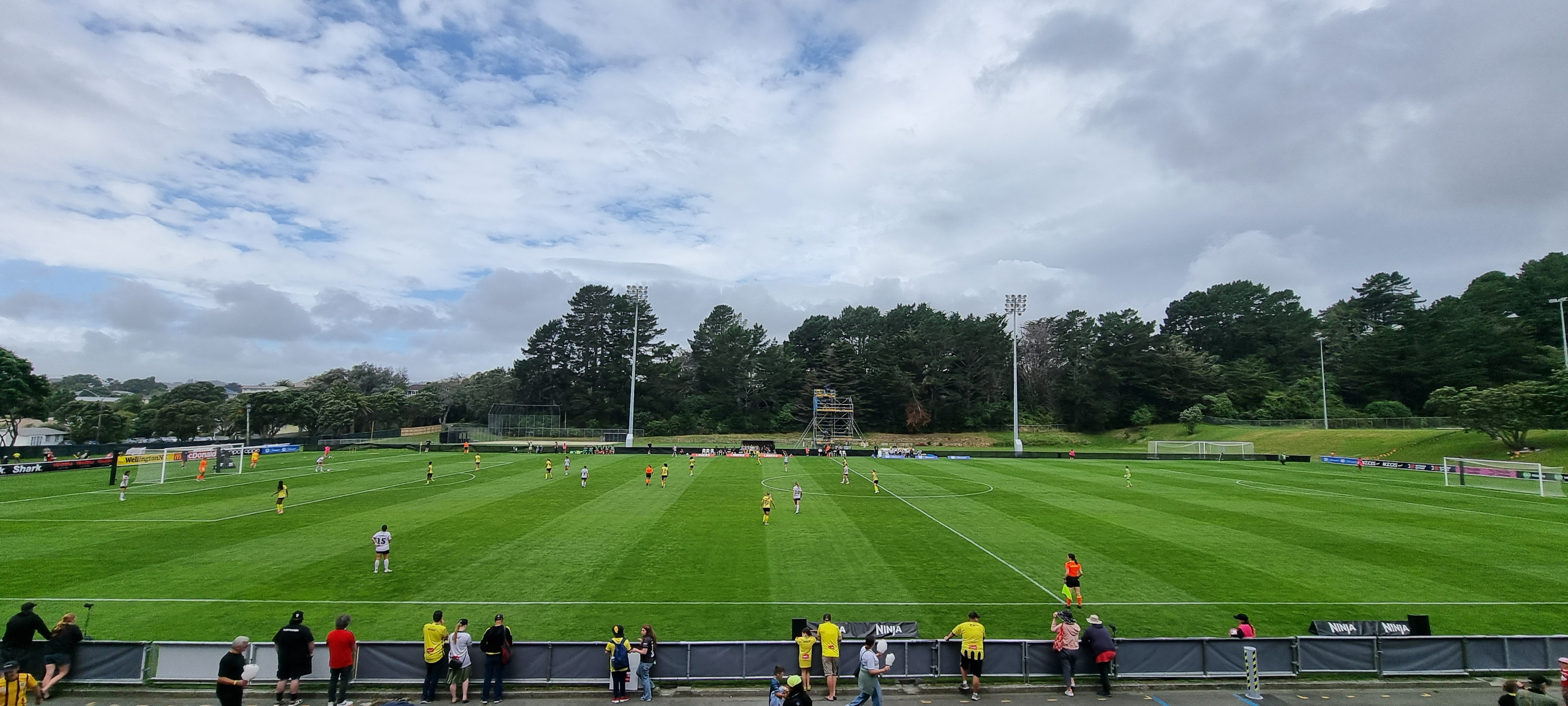
Match between the Phoenix and Adelaide United at Porirua Park (Jerry Collins Stadium) on 25 January 2026.

=== Establishment ===
For several years, there have been talks concerning the creation of a professional women's football team in New Zealand so as to boost the level of women's football in New Zealand and Oceania with the cost of travelling to away games a major barrier. There were no professional clubs in New Zealand and the National League only featured amateur teams. The talks intensified after New Zealand won the rights to co-host the 2023 FIFA Women's World Cup and the W-League plans to add three more expansion teams by that time.

In September 2021, Phoenix announced they were one of the clubs in consideration under the W-League expansion and later confirmed creating a women's team.

=== Inaugural season ===
On 11 October 2021, Wellington Phoenix announced Gemma Lewis would be the inaugural head coach of the side. They also announced that Natalie Lawrence would be her assistant for the 2021–22 season, making them one of two all-female coaching staffs in the A-League Women. A few days later, they announced former Perth Glory keeper and 2020–21 players’ player of the year, Lily Alfeld as the club's inaugural signing. Alfeld was later announced as the club's inaugural captain.

Phoenix played their home games at Wollongong with the hope of returning to their home stadium in Wellington later in the season. Wellington Phoenix started their debut season in the A-League in the 2021–22 season with a 0–0 draw against Western Sydney Wanderers at the Wollongong Showgrounds.

Ava Pritchard scored the club's first goal in their second game of the season, in a 1–5 loss to Newcastle Jets.

On 11 February 2022, the Phoenix achieved their first win in A-League Women history in a 3–0 away win against Canberra United. The Phoenix finished in last place in their first season.

=== Second, third, and fourth seasons ===
In the 2022–23 season, the Phoenix finished in last place although they finished the season with three wins and four draws.

In the 2023–24 season, Wellington achieved nine wins and one draw, and for the first time did not finish in last position, by finishing eighth. Venezueluan Mariana Speckmaier scored a club record 10 goals in a regular season.

During the 2024–25 season, the Phoenix finished in ninth position following seven wins and three draws.

=== Fifth season: Grand finalists ===
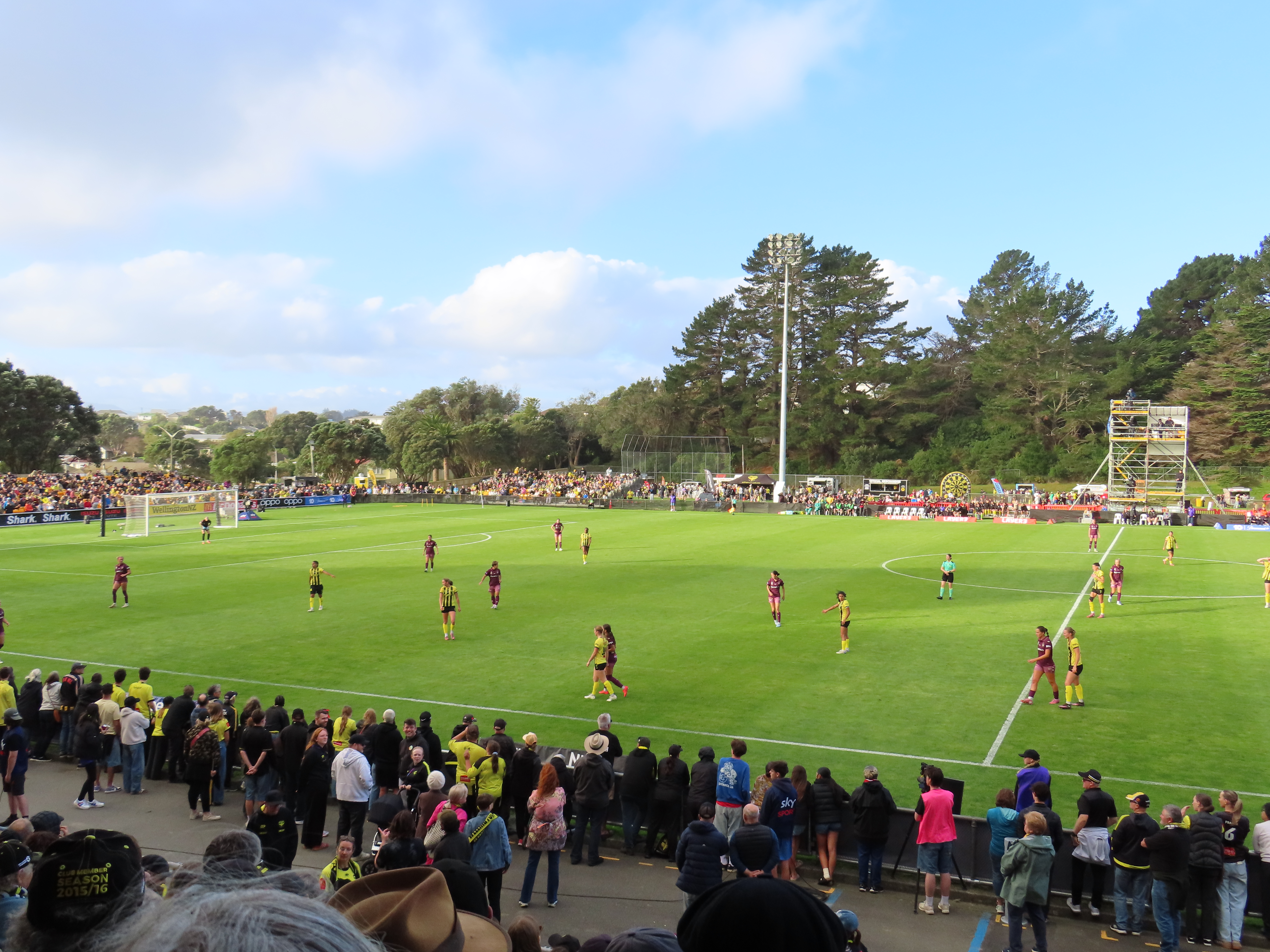
Semifinal match between the Phoenix and Brisbane Roar on 10 May 2026.

In April 2025, ahead of the 2025–26 season, Football Fern Annalie Longo announced her retirement from professional football. Dominican international Lucía León, American Ellie Walker, Dutch international Tessel Middag, Nepalese international Sabitra Bhandari, and Englishwoman Brooke Nunn were signed as the club's foreign players for the season. On 30 July 2025, the Phoenix signed former Canada national team coach Bev Priestman as head coach on a 2-year contract. That same month four players' contracts, those of Emma Main, Mackenzie Barry, Grace Jale, and Tiana Jaber, were renewed. During the regular season the Phoenix commenced their first three matches undefeated after two draws and one win. In the second match, a 1–1 draw with the Newcastle Jets, both Middag and Alyssa Whinham suffered season-ending anterior cruciate ligament (ACL) injuries. On 20 December, the Phoenix defeated Sydney FC by a club record 7–0 at Jerry Collins Stadium, Porirua. From 17 January to 6 February 2026, Wellington achieved four consecutive victories, including a 5–1 away win against the Jets on 1 February wherein Pia Vlok scored the club's first ever A-League Women hattrick. The Phoenix ended the regular season in second place, their highest ever position on the table.

Following a 3–2 aggregate (two-legged tie) win against the Brisbane Roar in the semifinal, with American Makala Woods scoring two goals in the return leg at Jerry Collins Stadium on 10 May, Wellington became the first ever New Zealand club to qualify for an A-Leagues grand final.

On 16 May, the Phoenix faced Melbourne City in the 2026 grand final at AAMI Park in Melbourne. Following a dominant first half from City and a brace from Holly McNamara, the hosts entered halftime with a 2–0 lead. Shortly into the second half, City's Leticia McKenna scored a long range effort. Makala Woods scored one goal to make the scoreline 3–1. Wellington were unable to capitalise further despite a period of dominance, with the score ending 3–1 to Melbourne City. Priestman praised the team's season performance despite the falter at the final, and she stated the club will come back stronger in the 2026–27 season, with investment into young players such as Vlok and the return of players such as CJ Bott and Bhandari. The 2026-27 season is off to a flying start.

== Players ==
=== First-team squad ===
As of 16 October 2026.

Note: Flags indicate national team as defined under FIFA eligibility rules; some limited exceptions apply. Players may hold more than one non-FIFA nationality.

No.	Pos.	Nation	Player
1	GK	NZL	Victoria Esson
2	DF	NZL	CJ Bott (captain)
3	DF	NZL	Lara Wall
4	DF	NZL	Mackenzie Barry
5	DF	USA	Ellie Walker
6	DF	NZL	Abby Erceg
7	MF	NZL	Grace Jale
8	FW	NZL	Milly Clegg
9	FW	NEP	Sabitra Bhandari
10	MF	NZL	Alyssa Whinham
11	MF	NZL	Manaia Elliott
13	MF	AUS	Tameka Yallop
16	DF	NZL	Marisa van der Meer
17	FW	NZL	Indiah-Paige Riley

No.	Pos.	Nation	Player
19	MF	NZL	Mikaela Bangalan (scholarship)
20	FW	NZL	Emma Taylor-Main
21	MF	NZL	Sienna Candy (youth)
22	GK	NZL	Aimee Danieli
23	FW	ENG	Brooke Nunn
24	FW	NZL	Pia Vlok (scholarship)
25	DF	NZL	Alyssha Eglinton (scholarship)
26	FW	NZL	Lily Brazendale (youth)
27	FW	NZL	Zoe Benson (scholarship)
29	DF	NZL	Freyan Des Fountain (youth)
30	DF	USA	Kam Pickett
31	FW	USA	Makala Woods
32	GK	NZL	Brooke Neary (scholarship)
33	GK	NZL	Addie Ferris (youth)

== Management team ==
=== Technical staff ===
As of 2 January 2026

Position	Staff
Manager	Bev Priestman
Assistant manager	Amy Shepherd
2nd Assistant/Team analyst	Tory Schiltgen
Goalkeeping Coach	Nick Stanton
Strength and conditioning coach	Kieran McMinn
Head physiotherapist	Beanie Joyes
Team operations & equipment manager	Toni West-Luamanu
Rehab Physiotherapist	Jamie Hassett
Assistant Analyst	Tyron Curtis

=== Captaincy history ===
Dates	Name	Honours (as captain)
2021–2023	(New Zealand) Lily Alfeld	Inaugural club captain
2023–2025	(New Zealand) Annalie Longo	
2025–	(New Zealand) CJ Bott	

== Records and statistics ==
- Record Win: 7–0 vs Sydney FC, A-League Women, 20 December 2025
- Record Defeat: 0–5 vs Sydney FC, A-League Women, 30 December 2021
- Record High Attendance: 5,923, vs Brisbane Roar at Porirua Park, Porirua, 10 May 2026 (A-League Women)
- Most Goals by a Player in a Game: 3
  - Pia Vlok vs Newcastle Jets, A-League Women, 1 February 2026
- Most Wins in a Row: 4 matches, from 17 January 2026 to 6 February 2026
- Most Losses in a Row: 9 matches, from 10 December 2021 to 4 February 2022
- Longest Undefeated Streak: 4 matches, from 22 November 2024 to 21 December 2024; from 17 January 2026 to 6 February 2026
- Most Goals In a Regular season: Mariana Speckmaier – 10 goals, 2023–24 A-League Women

=== Most appearances ===
As of end of 2025–26 season.

Competitive, professional matches only. All current players are in bold.

	Name	Years	A-League Women	Finals	Total
1	(New Zealand) **Mackenzie Barry**	2021–	91	3	**94**
2	(New Zealand) **Alyssa Whinham**	2021–	62	0	**62**
2	(New Zealand) **Manaia Elliott**	2023–	59	3	**62**
4	(New Zealand) Zoe McMeeken	2021–2025	55	0	**55**
4	(New Zealand) **Grace Jale**	2021–2022, 2024–	52	3	**55**

=== Top goalscorers ===
As of end of 2025–26 season.

Competitive, professional matches only, appearances including substitutes appear in brackets.

	Name	Years	A-League Women	Finals	Total	Goals per game
1	(New Zealand) **Grace Jale**	2021–2022, 2024–	11 (52)	1 (3)	**11** (55)	0.2
2	(Venezuela) Mariana Speckmaier	2023–2024	10 (21)	0 (0)	**10** (21)	0.48
2	(New Zealand) **Emma Main**	2023–	10 (54)	0 (0)	**10** (54)	0.19
4	(New Zealand) **Manaia Elliott**	2023–	8 (59)	0 (3)	**8** (62)	0.13
4	(United States) **Makala Woods**	2026–	5 (12)	3 (3)	**8** (15)	0.53

== Season-by-season record ==
Season	Division	League										Top scorer (Note: Regular season goals only.)	
Season	Division	P	W	D	L	F	A	GD	Pts	Pos	Finals	Name	Goals
2021–22	A-League Women	14	2	1	11	13	36	–23	7	10th	—	(New Zealand) Grace Jale	6
2022–23	A-League Women	18	3	4	11	20	30	–10	13	11th	—	(New Zealand) Milly Clegg	4
2023–24	A-League Women	22	9	1	12	36	33	+3	28	8th	—	(Venezuela) Mariana Speckmaier	10
2024–25	A-League Women	23	7	3	13	25	30	−5	24	9th	—	(England) Olivia Fergusson	5
2025–26	A-League Women	20	10	4	6	38	17	+21	34	2nd	GF	(England) Brooke Nunn (New Zealand) Pia Vlok	6

	Champions
	Runners-up
	Last place
	Did not make the playoff
♦	Top scorer in competition
EF	Elimination finals
SF	Semi-finals
GF	Grand final

== End-of-season awards ==
Season	Player of the Year	Members' Player of the Year	Players' Player of the Year	Media Player of the Year	Under-23 Player of the Year	Golden Boot	Lloyd Morrison Spirit of the Phoenix Award
2021–22	(New Zealand) Kate Taylor	(New Zealand) Kate Taylor	(New Zealand) Lily Alfeld	(New Zealand) Kate Taylor	(New Zealand) Alyssa Whinham	(New Zealand) Grace Jale	not awarded
2022–23	(New Zealand) Michaela Foster	(New Zealand) Michaela Foster	(New Zealand) Michaela Foster	(New Zealand) Michaela Foster	(New Zealand) Milly Clegg	(New Zealand) Milly Clegg	(New Zealand) Lily Alfeld
2023-24	(New Zealand) Mackenzie Barry	(New Zealand) Macey Fraser	(New Zealand) Mackenzie Barry	(Venezuela) Mariana Speckmaier	(New Zealand) Macey Fraser	(Venezuela) Mariana Speckmaier	(New Zealand) David Dome
2024–25	(New Zealand) Annalie Longo	(New Zealand) Annalie Longo	(New Zealand) Annalie Longo	(New Zealand) Annalie Longo	(New Zealand) Manaia Elliott	(England) Olivia Fergusson	(New Zealand) Annalie Longo
2025–26	(New Zealand) Grace Jale	(England) Brooke Nunn	(New Zealand) Grace Jale	(England) Brooke Nunn	(New Zealand) Pia Vlok	(England) Brooke Nunn (New Zealand) Pia Vlok	(New Zealand) Mackenzie Barry

== See also ==
- Wellington Phoenix FC
- Wellington Phoenix FC Reserves
