= 2026–27 Sydney FC season =

Sydney FC 2025–26 Season

Sydney FC
2026–27 season
- Chairman: Jan Voss
- Head Coach: Patrick Kisnorbo
- Stadium: Allianz Stadium
- A-League Men: 3rd
- Australia Cup: Semi-final
- Top goalscorer: League: Al Hassan Toure (4 goals); All: Tiago Quintal; Al Hassan Toure (4 goals each)
- Highest home attendance: 30,103 vs. Western Sydney Wanderers (16 October 2026); A-League Men
- Lowest home attendance: 3,187 vs. Melbourne Victory (9 September 2026); Australia Cup
- Average home league attendance: 16,619
- Biggest win: 4–1 vs. Central Coast Mariners (H) (6 November 2026); A-League Men
- Biggest defeat: 2–1 vs. Melbourne City (A) (25 October 2026); A-League Men
| Home colours | Away colours |
- All statistics correct as of 21 November 2026.

The 2026–27 season is Sydney Football Club's 22nd season in the A-League Men. In addition to the domestic league, Sydney will participate in this season's edition of the Australia Cup.

== Coaching staff ==
| Position | Name |
|---|---|
| Head coach | (Australia) Patrick Kisnorbo |
| Assistant coach | (Australia) Matt Sim |
| Goalkeeping coach | (Australia) Matthew Nash |

Source: Sydney FC

== Players ==
=== First-team squad ===
Note: Flags indicate national team as defined under FIFA eligibility rules; some limited exceptions apply. Players may hold more than one non-FIFA nationality.

| No. | Pos. | Nation | Player |
|---|---|---|---|
| 1 | GK | AUS | Gus Hoefsloot |
| 2 | DF | AUS | James Overy |
| 4 | DF | AUS | Jordan Courtney-Perkins |
| 5 | DF | AUS | Jacob Farrell (on loan from Portsmouth) |
| 7 | FW | AUS | Akol Akon (on loan from Colorado Rapids) |
| 8 | MF | AUS | Wataru Kamijo |
| 9 | FW | NGR | Oriola Sunday (on loan from RB Omiya Ardija) |
| 11 | FW | AUS | Abel Walatee |
| 12 | GK | AUS | Harrison Devenish-Meares |
| 14 | FW | JPN | Takahiro Sekine |
| 15 | MF | AUS | Jake Hollman |
| 16 | FW | AUS | Gabriel Popovic |
| 17 | DF | AUS | Ben Garuccio |
| 18 | FW | AUS | Zach Harrison |

| No. | Pos. | Nation | Player |
|---|---|---|---|
| 20 | FW | AUS | Tiago Quintal |
| 22 | FW | AUS | Mathias Macallister |
| 23 | DF | AUS | Rhyan Grant (captain) |
| 26 | MF | AUS | Nick Alfaro (scholarship) |
| 28 | DF | NZL | Ethan Dyer |
| 29 | MF | WAL | Joe Lacey |
| 30 | GK | AUS | Alexander Zaverdinos |
| 32 | DF | COD | Marcel Tisserand |
| 33 | MF | AUS | Marin France |
| 34 | DF | AUS | Tyler Williams (scholarship) |
| 35 | FW | AUS | Al Hassan Toure |
| 36 | MF | AUS | Rhys Youlley |
| 41 | DF | AUS | Alexandar Popovic |
| — | FW | ESP | Víctor Campuzano |

== Transfers ==
=== Transfers in ===
| No. | Position | Player | Transferred from | Type/fee | Contract length | Date | Ref. |
|---|---|---|---|---|---|---|---|
| 15 | MF | Jake Hollman | Unattached | Free transfer | 3 years | 1 July 2026 | |
| 16 | FW | Gabriel Popovic | Perth Glory | Free transfer | 2 years | 1 July 2026 | |
| 3 | DF | Aaron Gurd | (Thailand) Kanchanaburi Power | Loan return | (1 year) | 1 July 2026 | |
| 14 | FW | (Japan) Takahiro Sekine | (Japan) Urawa Red Diamonds | Free transfer | 3 years | 2 July 2026 | |
| 9 | FW | (Nigeria) Oriola Sunday | (Japan) RB Omiya Ardija | Loan | 1 year | 16 August 2026 | |
| 18 | FW | Zach Harrison | Brisbane Roar Youth | Free transfer | 3 years | 28 August 2026 | |
| 2 | DF | James Overy | (England) Manchester United Youth | Free transfer | 3 years | 7 September 2026 | |
| 5 | DF | Jacob Farrell | (England) Portsmouth | Loan | 1 year | 16 September 2026 | |
| 7 | FW | Akol Akon | (United States) Colorado Rapids | Loan | 1 year | 22 September 2026 | |

=== From youth squad ===
| N | Pos. | Nat. | Name | Age | Notes |
|---|---|---|---|---|---|
| 28 | DF | (New Zealand) | Ethan Dyer | 17 | 3-year contract |
| 30 | GK | (Australia) | Alexander Zaverdinos | 19 | 1-year contract |

=== Transfers out ===
| No. | Position | Player | Transferred to | Type/fee | Date | Ref. |
|---|---|---|---|---|---|---|
| 6 | MF | Corey Hollman | Unattached | End of contract | 30 June 2026 | |
| 7 | MF | (Peru) Piero Quispe | (Mexico) UNAM | End of loan | 30 June 2026 | |
| 10 | FW | (England) Joe Lolley | Newcastle Jets | End of contract | 30 June 2026 | |
| 13 | FW | Patrick Wood | Newcastle Jets | End of contract | 30 June 2026 | |
| 16 | DF | Joel King | Brisbane Roar | End of contract | 30 June 2026 | |
| 70 | MF | (Germany) Ahmet Arslan | Unattached | End of contract | 30 June 2026 | |
| 80 | FW | Apostolos Stamatelopoulos | (Scotland) Motherwell | End of loan | 30 June 2026 | |
| 24 | MF | Paul Okon-Engstler | (Germany) 1. FC Köln | €1,000,000 | 10 July 2026 | |
| 5 | DF | Alex Grant | Newcastle Jets | Mutual contract termination | 17 July 2026 | |
| 27 | MF | Lachie Middleton | (United States) Liberty Flames | Mutual contract termination | 3 August 2026 | |
| 21 | DF | Zac De Jesus | (Australia) Wollongong Wolves | Loan | 14 September 2026 | |
| 3 | DF | Aaron Gurd | (Australia) Sydney Olympic | Loan | 17 September 2026 | |
| 19 | FW | Mitchell Glasson | (Australia) Marconi Stallions | Loan | 17 September 2026 | |
| 7 | FW | Akol Akon | (United States) Colorado Rapids | A$1,500,000 | 22 September 2026 | |

=== Contract extensions ===
| No. | Position | Name | Duration | Date | Note |
|---|---|---|---|---|---|
| 4 | Jordan Courtney-Perkins | Left-back | 2 years | 10 June 2026 | |
| 17 | Ben Garuccio | Left-back | 2 years | 1 July 2026 | Replaces previous contract which ran until the end of 2026–27 |
| 7 | Akol Akon | Winger | 1 years | 3 July 2026 | Contract extended from end of 2027–28 season until end of 2028–29 season. |

== Kits ==
Supplier: Under Armour / Sponsor: Macquarie University

Outfield players kits

| Home | Away | Australia Cup Home |

Goalkeeper kits

| Goalkeeper 1 | Goalkeeper 2 | Goalkeeper 3 | Australia Cup Goalkeeper 1 | Australia Cup Goalkeeper 2 |

== Pre-season and friendlies ==
| 15 July 2026 | Sydney FC (Australia) | 4–0 | (Australia) NWS Spirit | Sydney, Australia |
| | Macallister; Quintal; France; G. Popovic | Report | | Stadium: Sky Park |

| 29 July 2026 2026 Sydney Super Cup | Sydney FC (Australia) | 1–1 (2–4 p) | (England) Tottenham Hotspur | Sydney, Australia |
| | Sekine 55' | Report | Tel 29' | Stadium: Allianz Stadium; Attendance: 26,216; Referee: Adam Kersey |
| | Penalties |
| | G. Popovic (penalty scored); Touré (penalty scored); Lacey (penalty missed); A. Popovic (penalty missed) | | (penalty scored) Williams-Barnett; (penalty scored) Tonali; (penalty scored) Robertson; (penalty missed) Donley; (penalty scored) Scarlett |

| 19 September 2026 | Sydney FC (Australia) | 5–0 | (Australia) Wollongong Wolves | Sydney, Australia |
| | Quintal; Toure; Akon | Report | | Stadium: Sky Park |

| 27 September 2026 | Sydney FC (Australia) | 3–4 | (Australia) Newcastle Jets | Sydney, Australia |
| | Toure; Quintal; Alfaro | Report | Goal | Stadium: Sky Park |

| 3 October 2026 | Sydney FC (Australia) | 2–0 | (Australia) Central Coast Mariners | Sydney, Australia |
| | Toure; G. Popovic | Report | | Stadium: Sky Park |

| 9 October 2026 | Sydney FC (Australia) | 4–1 | (Australia) Sydney Olympic | Sydney, Australia |
| | Sunday; Lacey; Garuccio; Akon | Report | Goal | Stadium: Sky Park |

== Competitions ==
=== Overall record ===
| Competition | First match | Last match | Starting round | Final position | Record | | | | | | | |
| Competition | First match | Last match | Starting round | Final position | Pld | W | D | L | GF | GA | GD | Win % |
|---|---|---|---|---|---|---|---|---|---|---|---|---|
| A-League Men | 16 October 2026 | 7 May 2027 | Matchday 1 | | 4 | 2 | 1 | 1 | 7 | 4 | +3 | 50.00 |
| Australia Cup | 21 July 2026 | 9 September 2026 | Round of 32 | Semi-final | 4 | 3 | 0 | 1 | 10 | 5 | +5 | 75.00 |
| Total | | | | | 8 | 5 | 1 | 2 | 17 | 9 | +8 | 62.50 |

Last updated: 6 November 2026
Source: Competitions

=== A-League Men ===
==== League table ====
| Pos | Team | Pld | W | D | L | GF | GA | GD | Pts | Qualification |
|---|---|---|---|---|---|---|---|---|---|---|
| 1 | Wellington Phoenix (Note: Auckland FC and Wellington Phoenix cannot qualify for Asian Football Confederation competitions as they are based in New Zealand, which is part of the Oceania Football Confederation.) | 5 | 3 | 1 | 1 | 8 | 3 | +5 | 10 | Qualification for the finals series (Note: The top two teams enter the finals series at the semi-finals, while the teams ranked third to sixth enter the finals series at the elimination-finals.) |
| 2 | Western Sydney Wanderers | 5 | 2 | 2 | 1 | 10 | 6 | +4 | 8 | Qualification for the AFC Champions League Elite league stage and the finals series |
| 3 | Sydney FC | 5 | 2 | 2 | 1 | 7 | 4 | +3 | 8 | Qualification for the AFC Champions League Elite preliminary stage and the finals series |
| 4 | Brisbane Roar | 4 | 2 | 2 | 0 | 5 | 3 | +2 | 8 | Qualification for the finals series |
| 5 | Macarthur FC | 5 | 2 | 2 | 1 | 6 | 5 | +1 | 8 | Qualification for the finals series |

Updated to match(es) played on 22 November 2026. Source: A-Leagues
Rules for classification: 1) points; 2) goal difference; 3) goals scored; 4) wins; 5) head-to-head results; 5a) head-to-head points; 5b) head-to-head goal difference; 6) Fair Play points; 7) away goal difference; 8) away goals per match; 9) home goal difference; 10) home goals per match; 11) toss of a coin in an event of a tie of two clubs.

==== Results summary ====
| Overall | | | | | | | | Home | | | | | | Away | | | | | |
| Pld | W | D | L | GF | GA | GD | Pts | W | D | L | GF | GA | GD | W | D | L | GF | GA | GD |
|---|---|---|---|---|---|---|---|---|---|---|---|---|---|---|---|---|---|---|---|
| 4 | 1 | 2 | 1 | 3 | 3 | 0 | 5 | 1 | 1 | 0 | 2 | 1 | +1 | 0 | 1 | 1 | 1 | 2 | −1 |

Last updated: 21 November 2026.
Source: Ultimate A-League

==== Results by round ====
| Round | 1 | 2 | 3 | 4 | 5 | 6 | 7 | 8 | 9 | 10 | 11 | 12 | 13 | 14 | 15 | 16 | 17 | 18 | 19 | 20 | 21 | 22 | 23 | 24 | 25 | 26 | 27 | 28 |
|---|---|---|---|---|---|---|---|---|---|---|---|---|---|---|---|---|---|---|---|---|---|---|---|---|---|---|---|---|
| Ground | H | H | A | H | A | B | H | A | H | H | H | A | H | A | A | H | B | A | H | A | A | A | H | A | A | H | A | H |
| Result | D | W | L | W | D | X | | | | | | | | | | | X | | | | | | | | | | | |
| Position | 6 | 4 | 5 | 2 | 3 | | | | | | | | | | | | | | | | | | | | | | | |
| Points | 1 | 4 | 4 | 7 | 8 | 8 | | | | | | | | | | | | | | | | | | | | | | |

Updated to match(es) played on 21 November 2026. Source: Ultimate A-League
A = Away; H = Home; W = Win; D = Draw; L = Loss; X = Bye

==== Matches ====
The league fixtures were announced on 11 September 2025.

Win Draw Loss Fixtures

| 16 October 2026 1 | Sydney FC | 0–0 | Western Sydney Wanderers | Sydney |
| 20:00 AEDT | | Report | | Stadium: Allianz Stadium; Attendance: 30,103; Referee: Alex King |

| 25 October 2026 2 | Sydney FC | 2–1 | Adelaide United | Sydney |
| 15:00 AEDT | Youlley 64'; Sunday 73' | Report | Burkitt 16' | Stadium: Allianz Stadium; Attendance: 10,733; Referee: Tim Danaskos |

| 31 October 2026 3 | Melbourne City | 2–1 | Sydney FC | Melbourne |
| 17:00 AEDT | Marcondes 46'; Mabil 62' | Report | Toure 37' | Stadium: AAMI Park; Attendance: 4,888; Referee: Ben Abraham |

| 6 November 2026 4 | Sydney FC | 4–1 | Central Coast Mariners | Sydney |
| 19:40 AEDT | Toure 31' (pen.), 42', 50'; G. Popovic 85' | Report | Lavale 90+1' (pen.) | Stadium: Allianz Stadium; Attendance: 9,022; Referee: Lachlan Keevers |

| 21 November 2026 5 | Brisbane Roar | 0–0 | Sydney FC | Brisbane |
| 15:00 AEST | | Report | | Stadium: Kayo Stadium; Attendance: 6,384; Referee: Daniel Elder |

| 6 December 2026 7 | Sydney FC | v | Melbourne Victory | Melbourne |
| 17:00 AEST | | | | Stadium: Allianz Stadium |

| 12 December 2026 8 | Auckland FC | v | Sydney FC | Auckland |
| 17:00 NZDT | | Report | | Stadium: Go Media Stadium |

| 18 December 2026 9 | Sydney FC | v | Perth Glory | Sydney |
| 17:40 AEDT | | Report | | Stadium: Allianz Stadium |

| 28 December 2026 10 | Sydney FC | v | Macarthur FC | Sydney |
| 19:00 AEDT | | Report | | Stadium: Allianz Stadium |

| 2 January 2027 11 | Sydney FC | v | Brisbane Roar | Sydney |
| 19:40 AEDT | | Report | | Stadium: Allianz Stadium |

| 9 January 2027 12 | Adelaide United | v | Sydney FC | Adelaide |
| 19:10 ACDT | | Source | | Stadium: Coopers Stadium |

| 16 January 2027 13 | Sydney FC | v | Newcastle Jets | Sydney |
| 19:40 AEDT | | Report | | Stadium: Allianz Stadium |

| 26 January 2027 14 | Melbourne Victory | v | Sydney FC | Melbourne |
| 19:40 AEST | | | | Stadium: AAMI Park |

| 30 January 2027 15 | Western Sydney Wanderers | v | Sydney FC | Sydney |
| 19:40 AEST | | Source | | Stadium: CommBank Stadium |

| 7 February 2027 16 | Sydney FC | v | Melbourne City | Sydney |
| 17:00 AEDT | | Report | | Stadium: Allianz Stadium |

| 20 February 2027 18 | Perth Glory | v | Sydney FC | Perth |
| 17:00 AWST | | Report | | Stadium: HBF Park |

| 27 February 2027 19 | Sydney FC | v | Auckland FC | Sydney |
| 17:00 AEDT | | Report | | Stadium: Allianz Stadium |

| 6 March 2027 20 | Wellington Phoenix | v | Sydney FC | Wellington |
| 15:00 NZDT | | | | Stadium: Hnry Stadium |

| 13 March 2027 21 | Macarthur FC | v | Sydney FC | Sydney |
| 19:40 AEDT | | Report | | Stadium: Campbelltown Sports Stadium |

| 20 March 2027 22 | Newcastle Jets | v | Sydney FC | Newcastle |
| 19:40 AEDT | | Source | | Stadium: McDonald Jones Stadium |

| 3 April 2027 23 | Sydney FC | v | Western Sydney Wanderers | Sydney |
| 19:40 AEDT | | Source | | Stadium: Allianz Stadium |

| 10 April 2027 24 | Melbourne Victory | v | Sydney FC | Melbourne |
| 19:40 AEST | | | | Stadium: AAMI Park |

| 17 April 2027 25 | Central Coast Mariners | v | Sydney FC | Gosford |
| 18:00 AEST | | | | Stadium: Polytec Stadium |

| 23 April 2027 26 | Sydney FC | v | Auckland FC | Sydney |
| 17:00 AEST | | Report | | Stadium: Allianz Stadium |

| 1 May 2027 27 | Macarthur FC | v | Sydney FC | Sydney |
| 19:40 AEST | | Report | | Stadium: Campbelltown Stadium |

| 7 May 2027 28 | Sydney FC | v | Wellington Phoenix | Sydney |
| 19:40 AEST | | | | Stadium: Allianz Stadium |

=== Australia Cup ===
| 21 July 2026 Round of 32 | Bayswater City | 1–5 | Sydney FC | Perth |
| 18:30 AWST | Teece 36' | Report | Quintal 20', 52', 64'; Macallister 38'; De Jesus 62' | Stadium: Frank Drago Reserve; Attendance: 1,052; Referee: Michael Ouliaris |

| 9 August 2026 Round of 16 | Brisbane Roar | 2–4 | Sydney FC | Brisbane |
| 17:00 AEST | Lauton 45+1'; A. Popovic 69' (o.g.) | Report | Sekine 2'; Garuccio 24'; Quintal 35'; G. Popovic 90+5' | Stadium: Spencer Park; Attendance: 3,800; Referee: Tom Fell |

| 18 August 2026 Quarter-final | SD Raiders | 0–1 | Sydney FC | Sydney |
| 19:30 AEST | | Report | Sekine 33' | Stadium: Fairfield Showground; Attendance: 3,941; Referee: Rowan Fisher |

| 9 September 2026 Semi-final | Sydney FC | 0–2 | Melbourne Victory | Sydney |
| 19:30 AEST | | Report | Jelacic 2'; Courtney-Perkins 61' (o.g.) | Stadium: Jubilee Stadium; Attendance: 3,187; Referee: Muhammad Taqi (Singapore) |

== Statistics ==
=== Appearances and goals ===
Includes all competitions. Players with no appearances not included in the list.

As of 21 November 2026

| No. | Pos | Nat | Player | Total | | A-League Men | | Australia Cup | |
| No. | Pos | Nat | Player | Apps | Goals | Apps | Goals | Apps | Goals |
Goalkeepers
| 1 | GK | (Australia) AUS | Gus Hoefsloot | 4 | 0 | 0 | 0 | 4 | 0 |
| 12 | GK | (Australia) AUS | Harrison Devenish-Meares | 5 | 0 | 5 | 0 | 0 | 0 |
Defenders
| 2 | DF | (Australia) AUS | James Overy | 6 | 0 | 0+5 | 0 | 0+1 | 0 |
| 4 | DF | (Australia) AUS | Jordan Courtney-Perkins | 9 | 0 | 5 | 0 | 4 | 0 |
| 5 | DF | (Australia) AUS | Jacob Farrell | 1 | 0 | 1 | 0 | 0 | 0 |
| 17 | DF | (Australia) AUS | Ben Garuccio | 9 | 1 | 5 | 0 | 4 | 1 |
| 23 | DF | (Australia) AUS | Rhyan Grant | 9 | 0 | 5 | 0 | 4 | 0 |
| 28 | DF | (New Zealand) NZL | Ethan Dyer | 1 | 0 | 0 | 0 | 0+1 | 0 |
| 41 | DF | (Australia) AUS | Alexandar Popovic | 9 | 0 | 5 | 0 | 4 | 0 |
Midfielders
| 8 | MF | (Australia) AUS | Wataru Kamijo | 8 | 0 | 4+1 | 0 | 1+2 | 0 |
| 15 | MF | (Australia) AUS | Jake Hollman | 3 | 0 | 1 | 0 | 1+1 | 0 |
| 20 | MF | (Australia) AUS | Tiago Quintal | 9 | 4 | 3+2 | 0 | 4 | 4 |
| 29 | MF | (Wales) WAL | Joe Lacey | 8 | 0 | 0+4 | 0 | 3+1 | 0 |
| 36 | MF | (Australia) AUS | Rhys Youlley | 9 | 1 | 5 | 1 | 3+1 | 0 |
| 38 | MF | (Australia) AUS | Sam Lancaster | 2 | 0 | 0 | 0 | 0+2 | 0 |
Forwards
| 7 | FW | (Australia) AUS | Akol Akon | 7 | 0 | 2+2 | 0 | 3 | 0 |
| 9 | FW | (Nigeria) NGR | Oriola Sunday | 6 | 1 | 5 | 1 | 1 | 0 |
| 14 | FW | (Japan) JPN | Takahiro Sekine | 8 | 2 | 4 | 0 | 3+1 | 2 |
| 16 | FW | (Australia) AUS | Gabriel Popovic | 6 | 2 | 0+3 | 1 | 0+3 | 1 |
| 22 | FW | (Australia) AUS | Mathias Macallister | 7 | 1 | 0+3 | 0 | 3+1 | 1 |
| 35 | FW | (Australia) AUS | Al Hassan Toure | 8 | 4 | 5 | 4 | 0+3 | 0 |
Player(s) transferred out but featured this season
| 21 | DF | (Australia) AUS | Zac De Jesus | 3 | 1 | 0 | 0 | 2+1 | 1 |

=== Disciplinary record ===
Includes all competitions. The list is sorted by squad number when total cards are equal. Players with no cards not included in the list.

As of 21 November 2026

| Rank | No. | Pos. | Nat. | Name | A-League Men | | | Australia Cup | | | Total | | |
| Rank | No. | Pos. | Nat. | Name | Yellow card | (yellow card) (yellow-red card) | Red card | Yellow card | (yellow card) (yellow-red card) | Red card | Yellow card | (yellow card) (yellow-red card) | Red card |
|---|---|---|---|---|---|---|---|---|---|---|---|---|---|
| 1 | 4 | DF | (Australia) | Jordan Courtney-Perkins | 1 | 0 | 0 | 2 | 0 | 0 | 3 | 0 | 0 |
| 1 | 17 | DF | (Australia) | Ben Garuccio | 3 | 0 | 0 | 0 | 0 | 0 | 3 | 0 | 0 |
| 3 | 8 | MF | (Australia) | Wataru Kamijo | 2 | 0 | 0 | 0 | 0 | 0 | 2 | 0 | 0 |
| 3 | 15 | MF | (Australia) | Jake Hollman | 1 | 0 | 0 | 1 | 0 | 0 | 2 | 0 | 0 |
| 3 | 23 | DF | (Australia) | Rhyan Grant | 1 | 0 | 0 | 1 | 0 | 0 | 2 | 0 | 0 |
| 3 | 29 | MF | (Wales) | Joe Lacey | 1 | 0 | 0 | 1 | 0 | 0 | 2 | 0 | 0 |
| 3 | 36 | MF | (Australia) | Rhys Youlley | 0 | 0 | 0 | 2 | 0 | 0 | 2 | 0 | 0 |
| 3 | 41 | DF | (Australia) | Alexandar Popovic | 2 | 0 | 0 | 0 | 0 | 0 | 2 | 0 | 0 |
| 9 | 5 | DF | (Australia) | Jacob Farrell | 1 | 0 | 0 | 0 | 0 | 0 | 1 | 0 | 0 |
| 9 | 9 | FW | (Nigeria) | Oriola Sunday | 1 | 0 | 0 | 0 | 0 | 0 | 1 | 0 | 0 |
| 9 | 14 | FW | (Japan) | Takahiro Sekine | 1 | 0 | 0 | 0 | 0 | 0 | 1 | 0 | 0 |
| 9 | 16 | FW | (Australia) | Gabriel Popovic | 0 | 0 | 0 | 1 | 0 | 0 | 1 | 0 | 0 |
| 9 | 20 | MF | (Australia) | Tiago Quintal | 0 | 0 | 0 | 1 | 0 | 0 | 1 | 0 | 0 |
| Total | | | | | 14 | 0 | 0 | 9 | 0 | 0 | 23 | 0 | 0 |

=== Clean sheets ===
Includes all competitions. The list is sorted by squad number when total clean sheets are equal. Numbers in parentheses represent games where both goalkeepers participated and both kept a clean sheet; the number in parentheses is awarded to the goalkeeper who was substituted on, whilst a full clean sheet is awarded to the goalkeeper who was on the field at the start of play. Goalkeepers with no clean sheets not included in the list.

As of 21 November 2026

| Rank | No. | Nat. | Goalkeeper | A-League Men | Australia Cup | Total |
|---|---|---|---|---|---|---|
| 1 | 12 | (Australia) | Harrison Devenish-Meares | 2 | 0 | 2 |
| 2 | 1 | (Australia) | Gus Hoefsloot | 0 | 1 | 1 |
| Total | | | | 2 | 1 | 2 |

== See also ==
- 2026–27 Sydney FC (women) season
