= 2026 A-Leagues All Stars Women game =

Soccer exhibition match in Sydney, New South Wales, Australia

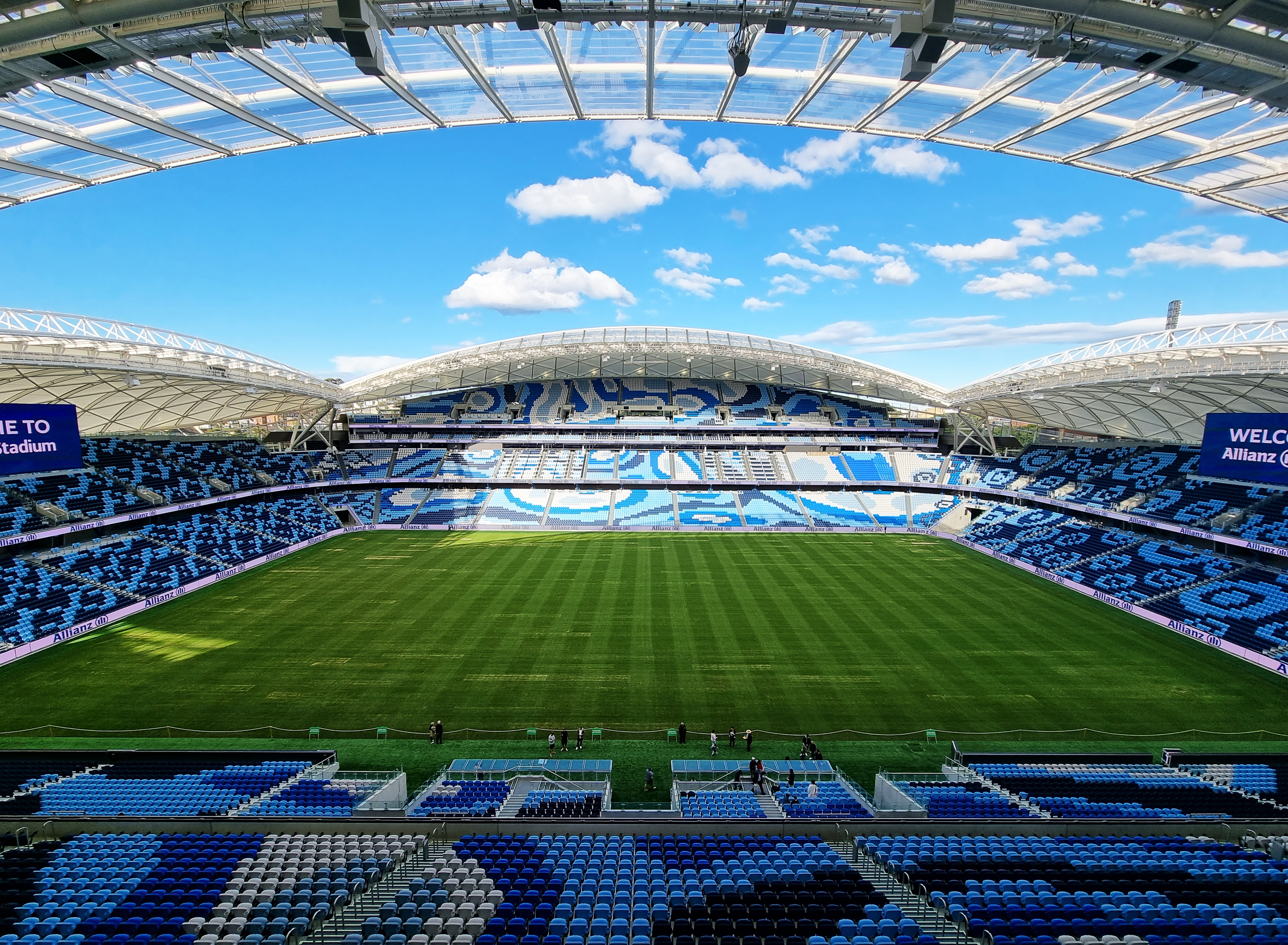
- The event took place at Allianz Stadium
- Event: 2026 Sydney Super Cup
A-Leagues All Stars Women	Chelsea
(Australia) (New Zealand)	(England)
0	3
- Date: 12 August 2026
- Venue: Allianz Stadium, Sydney, Australia
- Referee: Isabella Mossin
- Attendance: 22,137

The 2026 A-Leagues All Stars Women game was the second A-Leagues All Stars Women game, an exhibition soccer match in Australia. It featured an all-star squad from the A-League Women against English Women's Super League side Chelsea. The All-Star Game was played on 12 August 2026, at Allianz Stadium. The match was part of the 2026 Sydney Super Cup, the second edition of the Sydney Super Cup; Chelsea won 3–0.

== Background ==
In early December 2025 it was reported that Chelsea were a target for an off-season match against the A-Leagues All Stars Women in Australia, in part due to the presence of Australians Ellie Carpenter and Sam Kerr in the Chelsea side. On 8 December 2025, it was announced that the match between Chelsea and the A-Leagues All Stars Women would take place as part of the 2026 Sydney Super Cup in Sydney at Allianz Stadium on 12 August 2026.

On 9 March 2026 Melbourne Victory coach Jeff Hopkins was announced as head coach of the A-League All Stars. Melissa Barbieri and Maruschka Waldus were Hopkins' assistant coaches with Claire Coelho appointed as goalkeeping coach. In June of that year, Kerr signed with American club Gotham FC and consequently would not play for Chelsea in August.

== Squads ==
=== A-Leagues All Stars Women squad ===
On 11 July 2026 Tameka Yallop was the first member of the 18-player All Stars squad to be announced, with a new player revealed every day. Two years earlier, Yallop, Mackenzie Hawkesby, Kayla Morrison and Rebekah Stott were members of the 2024 All Stars against WSL team Arsenal.

Note: Flags indicate national team as defined under FIFA eligibility rules; some limited exceptions apply. Players may hold more than one non-FIFA nationality.

No.	Pos.	Nation	Player
1	GK	AUS	Courtney Newbon (Melbourne Victory)
6	MF	AUS	Leticia McKenna (Melbourne City)
3	DF	NZL	Claudia Bunge (Melbourne Victory)
4	DF	PHI	Angie Beard (Brisbane Roar)
5	DF	NZL	Rebekah Stott (Melbourne City)
7	FW	NZL	Grace Jale (Wellington Phoenix)
8	MF	AUS	Shelby McMahon (Melbourne City)
10	MF	AUS	Mackenzie Hawkesby (Sydney FC)
12	GK	AUS	Chloe Lincoln (Brisbane Roar)

No.	Pos.	Nation	Player
13	MF	AUS	Tameka Yallop (Brisbane Roar)
14	FW	AUS	Melina Ayres (Newcastle Jets)
16	DF	AUS	Karly Røstbakken (Melbourne City)
18	DF	USA	Kayla Morrison (Melbourne Victory)
19	MF	AUS	Talia Younis (Western Sydney Wanderers)
21	FW	AUS	Aideen Keane (Melbourne City)
24	FW	NZL	Pia Vlok (Wellington Phoenix)
23	FW	ENG	Brooke Nunn (Wellington Phoenix)
31	FW	USA	Makala Woods (Wellington Phoenix)

=== Chelsea squad ===
Chelsea announced the first three members of their travelling squad on 27 July 2026. The full 26-player squad was revealed on 2 August 2026. Republic of Ireland left-back Katie McCabe represented Arsenal in the 2024 edition before signing for Chelsea in June 2026. Nathalie Björn, who was included in the squad announcement on 27 July, was not named to the final travelling squad.

Note: Flags indicate national team as defined under FIFA eligibility rules; some limited exceptions apply. Players may hold more than one non-FIFA nationality.

No.	Pos.	Nation	Player
1	GK	SUI	Livia Peng
2	DF	AUS	Ellie Carpenter
4	DF	USA	Naomi Girma
5	DF	NED	Veerle Buurman
6	MF	GER	Sjoeke Nüsken
7	FW	COL	Mayra Ramírez
8	MF	SCO	Erin Cuthbert
9	FW	FRA	Melvine Malard
10	FW	ENG	Lauren James
11	FW	FRA	Sandy Baltimore
12	FW	USA	Alyssa Thompson
15	DF	IRL	Katie McCabe
16	MF	ITA	Giulia Dragoni

No.	Pos.	Nation	Player
17	DF	ENG	Nelly Las
19	MF	NED	Wieke Kaptein
21	MF	ENG	Keira Walsh
22	DF	ENG	Lucy Bronze
23	FW	JPN	Maika Hamano
24	GK	ENG	Hannah Hampton
25	MF	ENG	Lola Brown
26	DF	CAN	Kadeisha Buchanan
32	MF	ENG	Lexi Potter
33	FW	ENG	Aggie Beever-Jones
38	GK	JAM	Becky Spencer
40	GK	ENG	Katie Cox
42	DF	ENG	Chloe Sarwie

== Match ==
2026 A-Leagues All Stars Women game
12 August 2026
19:45 AEST

A-Leagues All Stars Women (Australia) (New Zealand)	0–3	(England) Chelsea
	Report	Baltimore 9'; Nüsken 12'; Potter 70'

Allianz Stadium, Sydney, New South Wales
Attendance: 22,137
Referee: Isabella Mossin
