= Rebekah Stott =

New Zealand footballer (born 1993)

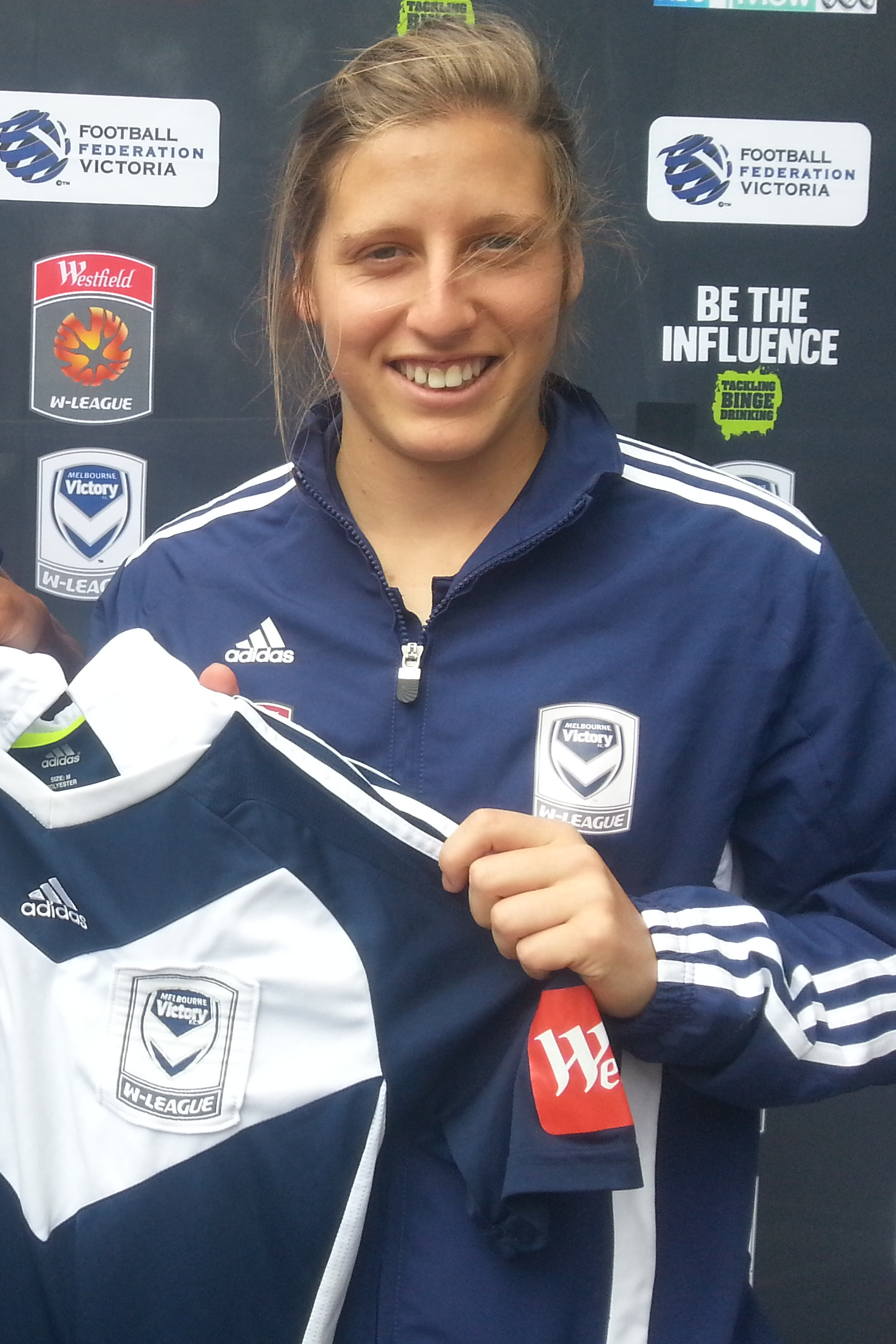
- Stott with Melbourne Victory in 2012

Personal information
- Full name: Rebekah Ashley Stott
- Date of birth: 17 June 1993 (age 33)
- Place of birth: Papamoa, New Zealand
- Height: 1.72 m (5 ft 8 in)
- Position: Defender

Team information
- Current team: Melbourne City
- Number: 13

Senior career*
Years	Team	Apps	(Gls)
2010–2011	Brisbane Roar	0	(0)
2011–2013	Melbourne Victory	25	(1)
2013–2015	SC Sand	44	(11)
2015–2017	Melbourne City	27	(2)
2017–2018	Seattle Reign FC	22	(0)
2017–2019	→ Melbourne City (loan)	33	(1)
2018	Sky Blue FC	9	(0)
2019	Avaldsnes IL	22	(0)
2019–2020	Melbourne City	7	(1)
2020–2021	Brighton & Hove Albion	7	(0)
2021	Bulleen Lions	1	(0)
2021–2022	Melbourne City	13	(0)
2022	Bulleen Lions	8	(0)
2022–2023	Brighton & Hove Albion	5	(0)
2023–	Melbourne City	66	(4)

International career^{‡}
2008–2009	Australia U17	12	(4)
- Australia U20
2012–	New Zealand	114	(4)
- * Club domestic league appearances and goals as of 23 May 2026. ‡ National team caps and goals as of 9 June 2026.

Rebekah Ashley Stott (born 17 June 1993) is a New Zealand professional footballer who plays as a defender for the Australian A-League Women club Melbourne City and the New Zealand women's national team. She previously played for Australian W-League teams Brisbane Roar, Melbourne Victory, and Melbourne City as well as German Bundesliga, team SC Sand, Sky Blue FC, and the Seattle Reign in the NWSL and Brighton & Hove Albion in the FA Women's Super League.

== Club career ==
After previously playing for Brisbane Roar and Melbourne Victory in the W-League, Stott joined Melbourne City for their inaugural season in 2015. She has played three seasons with Melbourne City winning three straight Championships.

On 17 January 2017, Stott signed with the Seattle Reign in the National Women's Soccer League. She made 22 appearances for the Reign in 2017.

On 11 January 2018, she was traded along with teammate Katie Johnson to Sky Blue FC. Due to injury Stott only made 9 appearances for Sky Blue.

After the 2018 NWSL season concluded, Stott signed with Avaldsnes IL in the Toppserien.

On 20 November 2019, Stott signed with Melbourne City.

On 2 September 2020, Stott signed a one-year deal with Brighton & Hove Albion who play in the FA Women's Super League (FA WSL) however she returned to Australia in February 2021 for medical treatment, cutting her stint short. After four months of treatment, Stott got back on the field, playing a few minutes for Bulleen Lions in the Australian National Premier Leagues.

In August 2021, Stott returned to the W-League, re-joining Melbourne City.

In July 2022, Stott rejoined Brighton on a two year contract.

On 11 August 2023, Stott rejoined Melbourne City on a two year contract.

After the 2023–24 season, Stott was selected for the inaugural A-Leagues All Stars Women team that were defeated 1–0 by Women's Super League (WSL) club Arsenal in the 2024 game at Marvel Stadium in Docklands, Melbourne as part of Global Football Week Melbourne.

After the 2025–26 season, Stott was again selected for the All Stars, this time for a team that lost 3–0 against WSL club Chelsea in the 2026 game at Allianz Stadium in Moore Park, Sydney as part of the 2026 Sydney Super Cup.

As of 16 October 2026, Stott is the most capped Melbourne City women with 141 matches and the fourth highest total in the A-League Women/W-League with 166 games.

== International career ==
Having represented Australia at the U-17 and U-20 age group level, Stott chose to represent the country of her birth at senior level, making her senior début for New Zealand as a substitute in a 3–1 win over China on 17 June 2012, her 19th birthday.

In July 2012, Stott was named to the New Zealand squad for the London Olympics but did not play in any of the tournament games. Stott did play in all of New Zealand's games of the 2013 Valais Cup competition including a historic 1–0 win over Brazil and the 4–0 victory over People's Republic of China in the final.

She featured in all of New Zealand's three matches at the 2015 FIFA Women's World Cup in Canada.

Stott was named to New Zealand's team for the 2016 Summer Olympics, she played every minute of their three games.

Stott was called up to the New Zealand squad for the 2023 FIFA Women's World Cup.

On 4 July 2024, Stott was called up to the New Zealand squad for the 2024 Summer Olympics.

== Personal life ==
On 4 March 2021, Stott revealed on Twitter that she was diagnosed with Stage 3 Hodgkin's lymphoma while she was in quarantine after returning to New Zealand. The illness cut her time at Brighton & Hove Albion short, and she ended up losing all her hair. She documented her journey on a second Instagram account and stated that she hoped to recover in time for when her country of New Zealand cohosts the 2023 FIFA Women's World Cup. On 23 July 2021, Stott announced on her personal website that her cancer was now in remission, and on 30 June 2023, she was named in New Zealand’s squad for the tournament.

== Career statistics ==
=== International ===
Scores and results list New Zealand's goal tally first, score column indicates score after each Stott goal.

List of international goals scored by Rebekah Stott
No.	Date	Venue	Opponent	Score	Result	Competition
1	27 October 2014	Kalabond Oval, Kokopo, Papua New Guinea	Papua New Guinea	1–0	3–0	2014 OFC Women's Nations Cup
2	29 October 2014	Kalabond Oval, Kokopo, Papua New Guinea	Cook Islands	8–0	11–0	2014 OFC Women's Nations Cup
3	15 June 2015	IG Field, Winnipeg, Canada	China	1–0	2–2	2015 FIFA Women's World Cup
4	23 January 2016	PNGFA Academy, Lae, Papua New Guinea	Papua New Guinea	2–0	7–1	2016 Olympic qualifying

== Honours ==
Brisbane Roar

- W-League Championship: 2010–11

SC Sand

- 2. Bundesliga (south): 2013–14

Melbourne City

- W-League Championship: 2015–16, 2016–17, 2017–18, 2019–20
- W-League Premiership: 2015–16, 2019–20

Australia U16

- AFF U-16 Women's Championship: 2009

New Zealand

- OFC Women's Nations Cup: 2014, 2018

Individual

- IFFHS OFC Woman Team of the Decade 2011–2020
- W-League Team of the Season
