= Tameka Yallop =

Australian soccer player (born 1991)

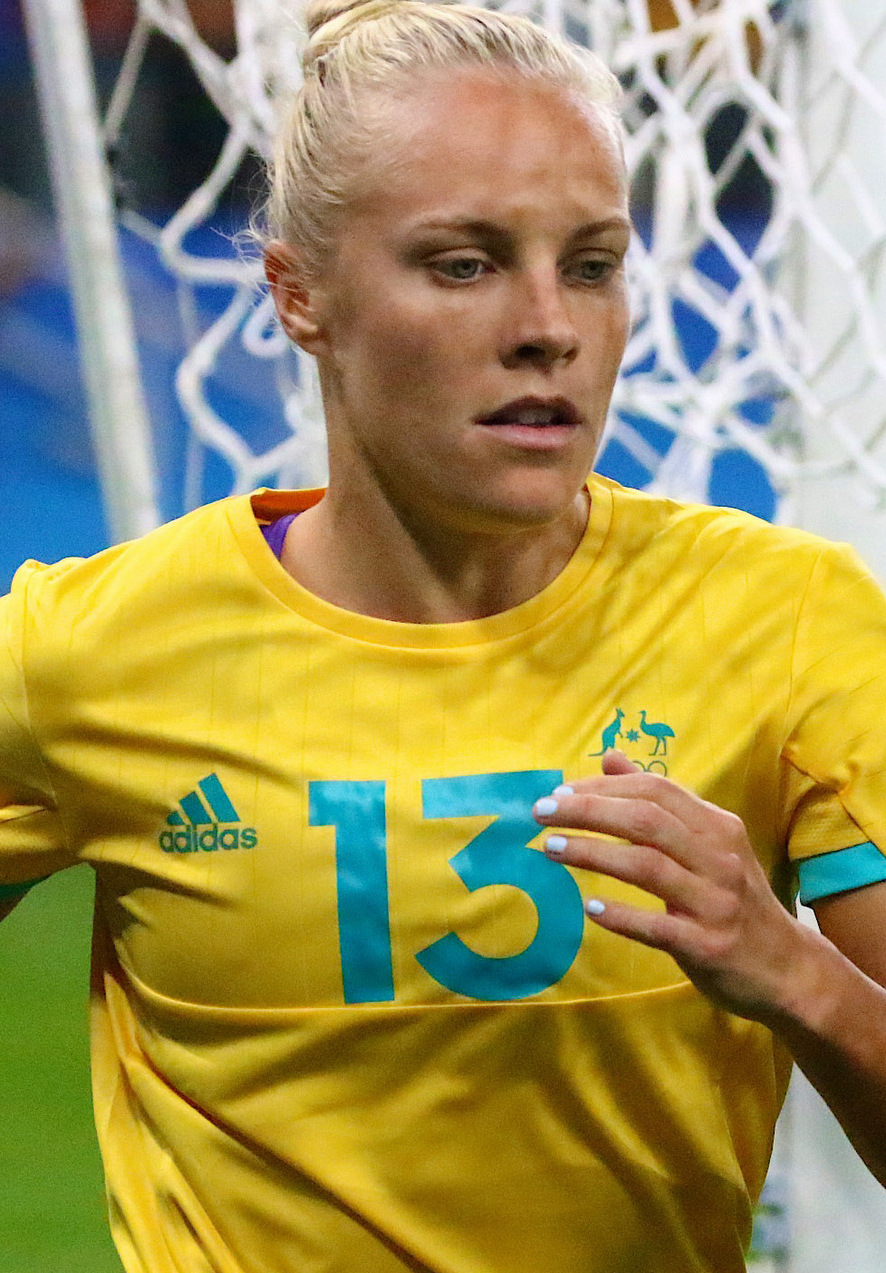
- Yallop playing for Australia at the 2016 Olympics

Personal information
- Full name: Tameka Yallop
- Birth name: Tameka Butt
- Date of birth: 16 June 1991 (age 35)
- Place of birth: Orange, New South Wales, Australia
- Height: 1.58 m (5 ft 2 in)
- Position: Midfielder

Team information
- Current team: Wellington Phoenix
- Number: 13

Youth career
- Mudgeeraba SC

Senior career*
Years	Team	Apps	(Gls)
2008	QAS		
2008–2018	Brisbane Roar	108	(49)
2010	→ Ottawa Fury (loan)		
2012	Boston Breakers	8	(3)
2013	1. FFC Frankfurt	8	(3)
2014	→ Iga F.C. Kunoichi (loan)		
2016	Mallbackens	19	(2)
2017–2018	Klepp IL	58	(32)
2018–2019	Melbourne City	10	(3)
2019–2021	Brisbane Roar	21	(6)
2021–2022	West Ham United	16	(1)
2022–2023	Brann	7	(1)
2023–2026	Brisbane Roar	29	(11)
2026–	Wellington Phoenix	5	(1)

International career^{‡}
2007–2008	Australia U-17	7	(1)
2007–2009	Australia U-20	16	(3)
2007–	Australia	134	(14)
- * Club domestic league appearances and goals as of 16 November 2026 ‡ National team caps and goals as of 10 July 2025

Tameka Yallop (/təˈmiːkə ˈjæləp/ tə-MEE-kə YAL-əp; née Butt; born 16 June 1991) is an Australian professional soccer player who plays as a midfielder for Wellington Phoenix in the A-League Women. She has previously played for the Boston Breakers in the WPSL Elite; 1. FFC Frankfurt in the German Frauen-Bundesliga; Iga F.C. Kunoichi in the Japanese Nadeshiko League; Mallbackens in the Swedish Damallsvenskan; Brisbane Roar in the former W-League; West Ham United in the FA Women's Super League; and Brann in the Norwegian Toppserien. She has been a member of the Australia women's national team since 2007.

== Early life ==
Yallop was born in Orange, New South Wales and moved with her family to the Gold Coast at five years of age. She started playing junior football at Five years of age for Mudgeeraba Soccer Club in the local Gold Coast league and attended All Saints Anglican School throughout her upbringing.

== Club career ==
Yallop preparing to take a corner kick for Wellington Phoenix in 2026.

=== Brisbane Roar, 2008–2018 ===
Yallop joined the Brisbane Roar (then the Queensland Roar) in 2008, as they were one of the founding members of the W-League. They won the W-League Championship and Premiership in 2008–09. In the 2010–11 season, Brisbane returned to the Grand Final, where Yallop scored a goal in the 9th minute, helping the team to a 2–1 victory.

She briefly played with the Ottawa Fury in 2010.

Yallop won the Westfield W-League Players Player of the Year Award for the 2012–13 season. She was the recipient of the Julie Dolan Medal for W-League Player of the year in 2014.

As of December 2024, Yallop ranks second in all-time A-League women history with 163 appearances and ranks third for goals with 66.

=== Boston Breakers, 2012 ===
Yallop signed with the Boston Breakers in the Women's Premier Soccer League Elite (WPSL Elite), the top division of women's soccer in the United States at the time, for the 2012 season.

=== FFC Frankfurt, 2013–2014 ===
In January 2013, Yallop signed for German Frauen-Bundesliga club 1. FFC Frankfurt.

=== Iga F.C. Kunoichi, 2014 ===
Yallop was loaned by Brisbane Roar to Iga F.C. Kunoichi along with Elise Kellond-Knight in late May 2014, and returned to Brisbane Roar for the 7th W-League season.

=== Mallbackens IF, 2016 ===
In March 2016, Yallop signed for Swedish club Mallbackens.

=== Klepp IL, 2017–2018 ===
In March 2017, Yallop signed for Norwegian club Klepp.

=== Melbourne City, 2018–2019 ===
After spending ten seasons with the Brisbane Roar, Yallop signed with Melbourne City for the 2018–19 W-League season.

=== Brisbane Roar, 2019–2021 ===
In October 2019, the Brisbane Roar announced that Yallop would be returning to Brisbane for the 2019–20 W-League season, where she scored in their first game of the season. On 5 December, Tameka became the first Brisbane Roar player (including men, women and youth) to score 50 goals for the club.

=== West Ham United, 2021–2022 ===
In May 2021, Yallop joined English club West Ham United. Playing 16 games with 1 goal in the FAWSL, 3 games in Women's FA Cup and 3 games in FA Women's League Cup. In August 2022, she left the club by mutual consent.

=== Brann, 2022–2023 ===
In August 2022, Yallop joined Norwegian club Brann on a one-year contract with a further six months option.

=== Brisbane Roar, 2023–2026 ===
In August 2023, Yallop returned to Australia, signing again with Brisbane Roar on a multi-year contract.

After the 2023–24 season, Yallop was selected for the inaugural A-Leagues All Stars Women team that were defeated 1–0 by Women's Super League (WSL) club Arsenal in the 2024 game at Marvel Stadium in Docklands, Melbourne as part of Global Football Week Melbourne.

Despite missing much of the 2025–26 season after pulling her right hamstring, Yallop was again selected for the All Stars, being the first player announced for a team that will play against WSL club Chelsea in the 2026 game at Allianz Stadium in Moore Park, Sydney as part of the 2026 Sydney Super Cup.

Following Yallop's departure from Brisbane in 2026, the Roar officially retired her shirt number of #13. As from 16 October 2026 she holds the A-League Women's record for second most appearances (189) and second most goals (77) behind long-term rival Michelle Heyman in both cases.

=== Wellington Phoenix, 2026– ===
On 11 August 2026, Yallop signed for New Zealand club Wellington Phoenix.

== International career ==
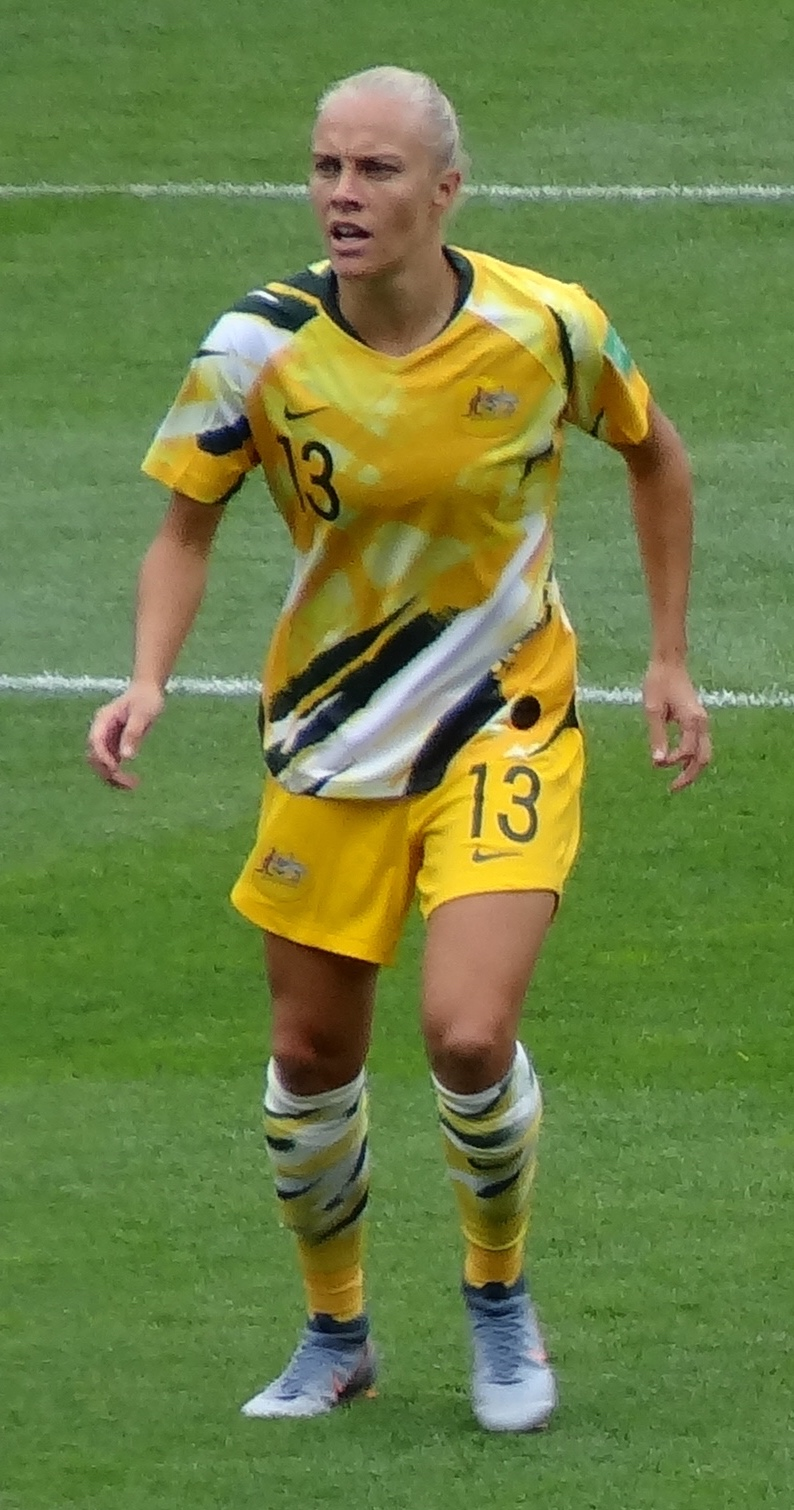
Yallop during 2019 Women's World Cup

Yallop has represented national women's teams at various age levels. She was a member of the Australia women's national under-17 soccer team (Junior Matildas) at the 2007 AFC Women's U-17 Asian Championships and Australia women's national under-20 soccer team (Young Matildas) for the 2008 AFC Women's U-20s Women's Asian Championship. Yallop captained the Young Matildas from 2007 to 2009, which included winning the 2008 AFF Women's Championship.

Yallop has been a member of the senior Australia women's national soccer team (Matildas) since 2007. In her debut game in August against Hong Kong she scored her maiden goal in the Australian's 1–8 victory in Hong Kong in an AFC Olympic Qualifier. She was part of the team that won the 2010 AFC Women's Asian Cup. Yallop played for Australia at the 2011 FIFA Women's World Cup and the 2015 FIFA Women's World Cup. Australia lost in the quarter-finals in 2011 and 2015.

In 2016, Yallop was named to her first Olympic team for Rio 2016. Australia lost in the quarter-finals and Yallop did not appear in any games.

At the 2017 Tournament of Nations Yallop scored the only goal in a 1–0 win over the United States. This was the first time Australia had ever defeated the United States. The Matildas won the entire tournament.

At the 2018 AFC Women's Asian Cup Yallop appeared in three games for Australia. The Matildas advanced to the final, where they lost 1–0 to Japan. Australia qualified for the 2019 FIFA Women's World Cup, and was selected by Ante Miličić as part of Australia's 23-player squad for the tournament.

Yallop was a member of the Matildas Tokyo 2020 Olympics squad. The Matildas qualified for the quarter-finals and beat Great Britain before being eliminated in the semi-final with Sweden. In the playoff for the bronze medal, they were beaten by the United States.

Yallop was named by Swedish coach Tony Gustavsson as part of Australia's 23-player squad for the 2023 FIFA Women's World Cup on home soil. The Matildas would go on a historic run in the tournament, finishing fourth and bringing the team and women's sport as a whole widespread popularity and mainstream attention throughout the country.

On 4 June 2024, Yallop was named in the Matildas team which qualified for the Paris 2024 Olympics, her third Olympic games selection.

Yallop was ruled out of the 2026 AFC Women's Asian Cup on home soil after pulling her right hamstring, and thus was not selected by coach Joe Montemurro as part of Australia's 26-player squad for the tournament. The Matildas went on to finish runners-up, losing 1–0 to Japan in the final.

== Career statistics ==
=== International goals ===
Scores and results list Australia's goal tally first, score column indicates score after each Butt/Yallop goal.

No.	Date	Venue	Opponent	Score	Result	Competition	Ref.
1	4 August 2007	Mong Kok Stadium, Kowloon, Hong Kong	Hong Kong	4–0	8–1	2008 Olympics qualification	
2	3 September 2011	Jinan Olympic Sports Center Stadium, Jinan, China	Thailand	4–0	5–1	2008 Olympics qualification	
3	11 September 2011	Shandong Provincial Stadium, Jinan, China	South Korea	2–1	2–1	2012 Olympics qualification	
4	22 November 2012	Bao'an Stadium, Shenzhen, China	Hong Kong	1–0	4–0	2013 EAFF Women's East Asian Cup preliminary	
5	6 July 2013	Stade Jean-Bouin, Angers, France	France	1–0	2–0	Friendly	
6	24 November 2013	WIN Stadium, Wollongong, Australia	China	2–0	2–0	Friendly	
7	25 October 2015	Yongchuan Sports Center, Chongqing, China	China	1–0	1–1	2015 Yongchuan International Tournament	
8	27 July 2017	CenturyLink Field, Seattle, United States	United States	1–0	1–0	2017 Tournament of Nations	
9	22 November 2017	Melbourne Rectangular Stadium, Melbourne, Australia	China	2–0	3–0	Friendly	
10	26 July 2018	Children's Mercy Park, Kansas City, United States	Brazil	2–0	3–1	2018 Tournament of Nations	
11	21 July 2021	Ajinomoto Stadium, Chofu, Tokyo, Japan	New Zealand	1–0	2–1	2020 Olympics Group G	
12	21 January 2022	Mumbai Football Arena, Mumbai, India	Indonesia	13–0	18–0	2022 AFC Women's Asian Cup	
13	1 November 2023	Perth Rectangular Stadium, Perth, Australia	Chinese Taipei	3–0	3–0	2024 AFC Women's Olympic Qualifying Tournament	
14	7 December 2024	Kardina Park, Geelong, Australia	Chinese Taipei	2–0	6–0	Friendly	

== Personal life ==
In December 2017, Yallop announced her engagement to her Klepp IL teammate Kirsty Yallop on her Twitter account. The two were married in Mangawhai, New Zealand, on 9 February 2019. Following the marriage, they both took on the surname Yallop. In 2020, they had a daughter named Harley. The couple's second daughter, Nova, was born in 2025.

Yallop cited family reasons for choosing to sign for Wellington ahead of the 2026–27 A-League Women season, relocating to Kirsty's home country.

== Honours ==
Brisbane Roar

- W-League Premiership: 2008–09, 2012–13, 2017–18
- W-League Championship: 2008–09, 2010–11

Australia

- AFC Women's Asian Cup: 2010
- AFF Women's Championship: 2008
- AFC Olympic Qualifying Tournament: 2016
- Tournament of Nations: 2017
- FFA Cup of Nations: 2019

Individual

- Julie Dolan Medal: 2013–14

== See also ==
- List of women's footballers with 100 or more international caps
