= Global Football Week Melbourne =

Tournament details
- Host country: Australia
- Cities: Melbourne, Victoria
- Dates: 21 May 2024–24 May 2024
- Teams: (Australia) (New Zealand) A-Leagues All Stars Men (Australia) (New Zealand) A-Leagues All Stars Women (England) Tottenham Hotspur (England) Newcastle United (England) Arsenal Women's
- Venue(s): Melbourne Cricket Ground; Marvel Stadium; AAMI Park

Tournament statistics
- Matches played: 3
- Goals scored: 11 (3.67 per match)
- Attendance: 162,659 (54,220 per match)
- Top scorer: Apostolos Stamatelopoulos (2 goals) v Newcastle

Global Football Week Melbourne was a series of soccer events that took place from 21 May–24 May 2024 in Melbourne, Australia. The events featured the 2024 A-Leagues All Stars Games, against English clubs Newcastle United and Arsenal Women's at Marvel Stadium. The opening match of the series was played between Tottenham Hotspur and Newcastle United at Melbourne Cricket Ground.

Global Football Week Melbourne was announced on 18 March 2024 as a collaboration between the Australian Professional Leagues (APL), Visit Victoria and TEG Sport. Three friendly matches were first announced, which later expanded to include two open training sessions at AAMI Park and two business events.

== Background ==
On 18 March 2024, the Australian Professional Leagues (APL), partnered with TEG Sport and Visit Victoria, announced three exhibition matches set to take place across two days in May. The first match was between Premier League clubs Tottenham Hotspur and Newcastle United on 22 May 2024 at Melbourne Cricket Ground. The remaining two matches were the 2024 A-Leagues All Stars Games. These games consisted of a team of players representing the A-League Men, and an inaugural team representing the A-League Women. The Men's Team played against Newcastle United, while the Women's Team played against Arsenal Women's. The 2024 A-Leagues All Stars Games were played at Marvel Stadium on 24 May 2024.

== Venues and events ==
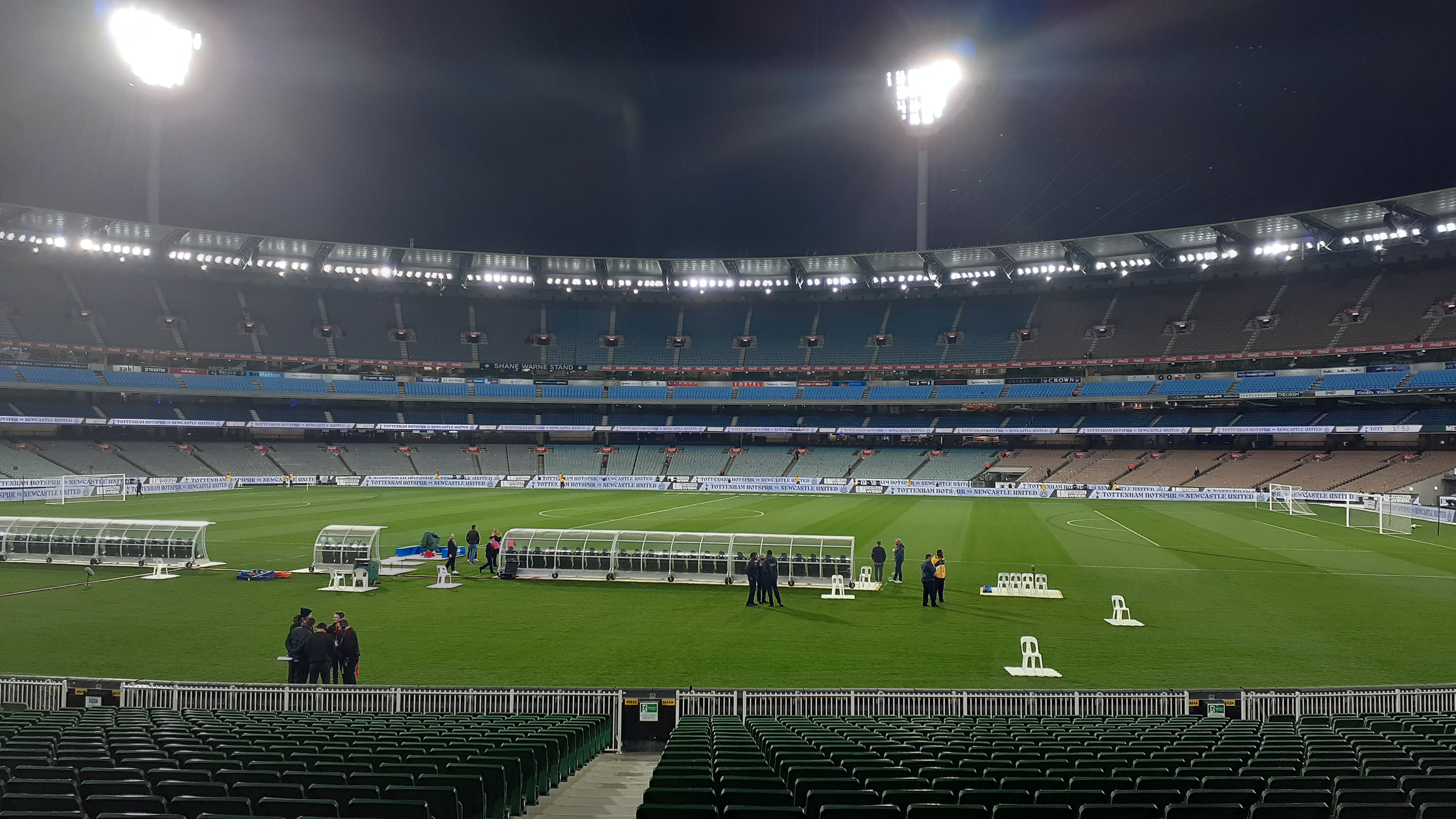
MCG before Tottenham Hotspur vs Newcastle United at Global Football Week Melbourne

The friendly between Tottenham Hotspur and Newcastle United was played at the Melbourne Cricket Ground on 22 May 2024, while the 2024 Men's and Women's A-Leagues All Stars Games were played at Marvel Stadium on 24 May 2024. The two open training sessions were held at AAMI Park on 21 and 23 May 2024. The business lunch with Ange Postecoglou was held in the Olympic Room at the Melbourne Cricket Ground on 21 May 2024, while the Women in Football Business Brunch was held in the Skyline Room at Marvel Stadium on 22 May 2024.

Australia
Melbourne
Melbourne Cricket Ground	Marvel Stadium	AAMI Park
Capacity: 100,024	Capacity: 53,343	Capacity: 30,050

== Matches ==
22 May 2024 1	Tottenham Hotspur (England)	1–1 (4–5 p)	(England) Newcastle United	Melbourne Cricket Ground
19:45 AEST	Maddison 32'	Report	Isak 45'	Attendance: 78,419; Referee: Alireza Faghani
	Penalties
	Gil (penalty missed); Scarlett (penalty scored); Donley (penalty scored); Hall (penalty scored); Skipp (penalty scored)		(penalty scored) White; (penalty scored) Parkinson; (penalty scored) Diallo; (penalty scored) Kuol; (penalty scored) Ashby

24 May 2024 2	A-Leagues All Stars Men (Australia) (New Zealand)	8–0	(England) Newcastle United	Marvel Stadium
17:15 AEST	Old 5'; Milanovic 25'; Taggart 34'; Stamatelopoulos 62', 74'; Hollman 82'; Courtney-Perkins 89'; Kraev 90+2'	Report		Attendance: 42,120; Referee: Daniel Elder

24 May 2024 3	A-Leagues All Stars Women (Australia) (New Zealand)	0–1	(England) Arsenal	Marvel Stadium
20:05 AEST		Report	Russo 39'	Attendance: 42,120; Referee: Casey Reibelt
