= James Overy =

Australian soccer player (born 2007)

Personal information
- Full name: James Harrison Overy
- Date of birth: 9 November 2007 (age 19)
- Place of birth: Perth, Western Australia, Australia
- Height: 5 ft 9 in (1.74 m)
- Position: Right-back

Team information
- Current team: Sydney FC
- Number: 2

Youth career
- 2021–2024: Perth Glory
- 2024–2026: Manchester United

Senior career*
Years	Team	Apps	(Gls)
2024	Newton Abbot Spurs	6	(3)
2026–	Sydney FC	1	(0)

International career^{‡}
2024	Scotland U19	2	(1)
2025–	Australia U20	4	(0)
2026–	Australia U23	4	(0)
- * Club domestic league appearances and goals as of 16 September 2026 ‡ National team caps and goals as of 17 January 2026

James Harrison Overy (born 9 November 2007) is an Australian soccer player who plays as a right-back for A-League Men club Sydney FC and the Australia under-23 national team. He previously represented Scotland at under-19 level and Australia at under-18 and under-20 level.

== Club career ==
Overy began his career with Australian A-League side Perth Glory, and played in a friendly match against English Premier League side West Ham United in 2023 at the age of fifteen. His family relocated to Devon, England in the same year, and he went on to join South West Peninsula League side Newton Abbot Spurs, spending time with the club's first team in 2024.

In May 2024 it was reported that Premier League club Manchester United had offered Overy a scholarship deal. In June of the same year, he reportedly accepted this deal, rejecting other Premier League clubs in the process. This move prompted an investigation from world footballing body FIFA; as Overy had signed with Newton Abbot Spurs in March 2024, he could not move to another club until 16 weeks had elapsed. After getting clearance, the move was completed in September 2024.

On 15 October 2024, he was named by English newspaper The Guardian as one of the best players born in 2007 worldwide.

On 7 September 2026, Overy returned to Australia, signing with Sydney FC on a three-year contract.

== International career ==
Overy was called up for the Scotland national under-19 football team in March 2025.

Overy was called up in May 2025 for the Australia men's national under-18 football team, to take part in the 2025 UEFA Friendship Cup commencing at the end of May. In September, he was called-up for Australia's preliminary squad for the 2025 FIFA U-20 World Cup. He was included in the squad for the tournament, playing two of Australia's matches against Argentina and Cuba.

In November 2025, Overy was called up for the first time to the senior Australia men's national soccer team. He was an unused substitute for Australia's friendly matches against Colombia and Venezuela.

== Personal life ==
Born in Australia, Overy is of Scottish descent through his mother.

== Career statistics ==
=== Club ===
As of 15 October 2024.

Appearances and goals by club, season and competition
Club	Season	League			Cup		Other		Total	
Club	Season	Division	Apps	Goals	Apps	Goals	Apps	Goals	Apps	Goals
Newton Abbot Spurs	2023–24	SWPL	6	3	0	0	0	0	6	3
Sydney FC	2026–27	A-League Men	0	0	0	0	0	0	0	0
Career total			6	3	0	0	0	0	6	3
