= 2024 A-Leagues All Stars Men game =

2024 A-Leagues All Star Men game
- Event: 2023–24 A-League Men
A-Leagues All Stars Men	Newcastle United
(Australia) (New Zealand)	(England)
8	0
- Date: 24 May 2024
- Venue: Marvel Stadium, Melbourne, Australia

The 2024 A-Leagues All Stars Men game was the fourth edition of the A-Leagues All Stars Game, and the first since the 2022 Game. It was held at Marvel Stadium in Melbourne on 24 May 2024 against English club Newcastle United as part of Global Football Week Melbourne.

== Pre-match ==
In March 2024, the A-Leagues announced that the A-League All Stars Men would play Newcastle United at Marvel Stadium in Melbourne on 24 May 2024 as part of Global Football Week Melbourne – shortly ahead of the 2024 A-League Men Grand Final. In addition, an A-Leagues All Stars Women game would be held for the first time, against Arsenal, immediately after the men's game at the same venue. Newcastle would also play Tottenham Hotspur at the Melbourne Cricket Ground in a friendly two days before the All Stars game. The official kit partner was announced to be Kappa.

== Squads ==
The A-League All Stars Men squad initially consisted of 23 to 26 players, as selected by the coaching staff, before being finalised to a 21 player squad. Only a maximum of four players per club could be chosen. Nestory Irankunda and Daniel Penha were announced to be the first two players to be selected in the squad as voted by fans. On 14 May 2024, Patrick Kisnorbo was named head coach of the A-League All Stars Men, with Robert Stanton and Mark Milligan as assistant coaches and Michael Theo as goalkeeping coach.

A 13-player preliminary squad selected by Kisnorbo was announced on 15 May. Penha withdrew for personal reasons. Following the season's semi-finals on 20 May, Kisnorbo added eight players from Sydney FC and Wellington Phoenix to finalise a 21-player squad for the match. Around the same day, Newcastle United's head coach Eddie Howe announced a 29-player squad for the matches against Tottenham Hotspur and the A-League Men All Stars. Garang Kuol featured as the only Australian player for Newcastle from their 2023–24 season.

Before the match, Howe renamed the starting line-up from their match against Tottenham to consist of under-21s players. Kieran Trippier was named on the bench as the only over-21 player in the match squad after a majority of first-team players were withdrawn. Kuol made his unofficial starting debut for Newcastle in the match. None of the players named for the English side had registered a Premier League start prior to the match.

=== A-Leagues All Stars Men squad ===
Note: Flags indicate national team as defined under FIFA eligibility rules; some limited exceptions apply. Players may hold more than one non-FIFA nationality.

No.	Pos.	Nation	Player
1	GK	NZL	Alex Paulsen (Wellington Phoenix)
4	DF	ENG	Scott Wootton (Wellington Phoenix)
6	MF	AUS	Luke Brattan (Sydney FC)
7	FW	AUS	Mathew Leckie (Melbourne City)
8	DF	BRA	Marcelo (Western Sydney Wanderers)
9	FW	AUS	Apostolos Stamatelopoulos (Newcastle Jets)
10	MF	GER	Tolgay Arslan (Melbourne City)
11	MF	BUL	Bozhidar Kraev (Wellington Phoenix)
12	MF	AUS	Jake Hollman (Macarthur FC)
14	FW	AUS	Nicolas Milanovic (Western Sydney Wanderers)
17	DF	AUS	Ben Garuccio (Western United)

No.	Pos.	Nation	Player
18	MF	NZL	Ben Old (Wellington Phoenix)
20	GK	AUS	Lawrence Thomas (Western Sydney Wanderers)
21	DF	AUS	Jordan Courtney-Perkins (Sydney FC)
22	FW	AUS	Adam Taggart (Perth Glory)
23	DF	AUS	Rhyan Grant (Sydney FC)
26	MF	IRL	Jay O'Shea (Brisbane Roar)
27	DF	AUS	Kai Trewin (Brisbane Roar)
32	MF	AUS	Angus Thurgate (Western United)
66	FW	AUS	Nestory Irankunda (Adelaide United)
—	DF	NZL	Tim Payne (Wellington Phoenix)

=== Newcastle United squad ===
Note: Flags indicate national team as defined under FIFA eligibility rules; some limited exceptions apply. Players may hold more than one non-FIFA nationality.

No.	Pos.	Nation	Player
2	DF	ENG	Kieran Trippier
3	DF	WAL	Paul Dummett
7	MF	BRA	Joelinton
9	FW	ENG	Callum Wilson
11	MF	SCO	Matt Ritchie
14	FW	SWE	Alexander Isak
15	FW	ENG	Harvey Barnes
17	DF	SWE	Emil Krafth
20	DF	ENG	Lewis Hall
22	GK	ENG	Nick Pope
23	MF	ENG	Jacob Murphy
24	FW	PAR	Miguel Almirón
29	GK	ENG	Mark Gillespie
30	DF	SCO	Harrison Ashby
32	MF	SCO	Elliot Anderson

No.	Pos.	Nation	Player
33	DF	ENG	Dan Burn
34	MF	SCO	Lucas De Bolle
38	FW	AUS	Garang Kuol
39	MF	BRA	Bruno Guimarães
40	MF	ENG	Joe White
49	FW	ENG	Amadou Diallo
52	MF	ENG	Jay Turner-Cooke
54	DF	IRL	Alex Murphy
63	FW	ENG	Ben Parkinson
64	MF	ENG	Ellis Stanton
65	DF	ENG	Ciaran Thompson
72	DF	ENG	Dylan Charlton
84	GK	ENG	Aidan Harris
90	MF	NOR	Travis Hernes

== Match ==
=== Details ===
24 May 2024
17:15 AEST

A-Leagues All Stars Men	8–0	(England) Newcastle United
Old 5'; Milanovic 25'; Taggart 34'; Stamatelopoulos 62', 74'; Hollman 82'; Courtney-Perkins 89'; Kraev 90+2'	Report

Marvel Stadium, Melbourne
Attendance: 42,120
Referee: Daniel Elder (Australia)

GK	1	(New Zealand) Alex Paulsen	(substituted off) 46'
DF	17	(Australia) Ben Garuccio	(substituted off) 61'
DF	4	(England) Scott Wootton
DF	8	(Brazil) Marcelo	(substituted off) 61'
DF	23	(Australia) Rhyan Grant
MF	32	(Australia) Angus Thurgate	(substituted off) 72'
MF	26	(Republic of Ireland) Jay O'Shea	(substituted off) 72'
MF	18	(New Zealand) Ben Old	(substituted off) 72'
MF	7	(Australia) Mathew Leckie	(substituted off) 61'
MF	14	(Australia) Nicolas Milanovic	(substituted off) 72'
FW	22	(Australia) Adam Taggart	(substituted off) 46'
Substitutes:
GK	20	(Australia) Lawrence Thomas	(substituted on) 46'
MF	6	(Australia) Luke Brattan	(substituted on) 72'
FW	9	(Australia) Apostolos Stamatelopoulos	(substituted on) 46'
MF	10	(Germany) Tolgay Arslan	(substituted on) 72'
MF	11	(Bulgaria) Bozhidar Kraev	(substituted on) 72'
MF	12	(Australia) Jake Hollman	(substituted on) 61'
DF	21	(Australia) Jordan Courtney-Perkins	(substituted on) 61'
DF	27	(Australia) Kai Trewin	(substituted on) 61'
MF	66	(Australia) Nestory Irankunda	(substituted on) 72'
Manager:
(Australia) Patrick Kisnorbo

GK	29	(England) Mark Gillespie		(substituted off) 63'
DF	72	(England) Dylan Charlton
DF	54	(Republic of Ireland) Alex Murphy
DF	65	(England) Ciaran Thompson		(substituted off) 46'
DF	30	(Scotland) Harrison Ashby	(yellow card) 87'
MF	90	(Norway) Travis Hernes
MF	52	(England) Jay Turner-Cooke		(substituted off) 46'
MF	40	(England) Joe White
MF	38	(Australia) Garang Kuol
FW	63	(England) Ben Parkinson
FW	7	(England) Amadou Diallo
Substitutes:
GK	84	(England) Aidan Harris		(substituted on) 63'
DF	2	(England) Kieran Trippier
DF	20	(England) Lewis Hall
MF	32	(England) Elliot Anderson
MF	34	(Scotland) Lucas De Bolle		(substituted on) 46'
MF	64	(England) Ellis Stanton		(substituted on) 46'
Manager:
(England) Eddie Howe

== Post-match ==
The men's game was heavily criticised for the schedule of the event which resorted Newcastle United to field a team of players from their youth academy after the club's first-team players were withdrawn for international duty. The average age of the match squad was 19.5 years old, excluding goalkeeper Mark Gillespie. Eddie Howe noted that it was not possible for his side to field the first-team players due to travel, risk of injuries, and the recent conclusion of the 2023–24 Premier League. Newcastle reportedly travelled 16,914 km (10,510 m) from Heathrow Airport to play in Melbourne, three days after their 2023–24 season finished. Kieran Trippier and Alan Shearer criticised the date of the friendlies which placed near to the 2024 Copa América and UEFA Euro in June 2024. For fans, the match was deemed to be disrespectful to the A-League and local supporters for fielding a weaker side than anticipated. Newcastle were reported to have received a seven-figure sum from the matches.

After concerns were raised about player welfare, The Football Association opened about a rule change that would prohibit overseas friendlies after a season was completed. English clubs are also obligated to give players a five-week rest following that period. The Australian Professional Leagues (APL) were reported to be aware of these concerns. The match was the first win for the A-League Men in an A-Leagues All Stars Game after losing in the matches to Manchester United, Juventus and Barcelona. The crowd was confirmed to be 42,000 spectators in total after the women's match. Despite the absence of first-team players, Howe said the match was a great experience for the younger players going against experienced opposition. All Stars head coach Patrick Kisnorbo praised his sides' hunger and dominance during the match although understood Howe's decision prior. Kisnorbo also suggested for future matches to be between an Asian side rather than a European opposition to solve scheduling issues.
