= Oriola Sunday =

Nigerian footballer (born 2003)

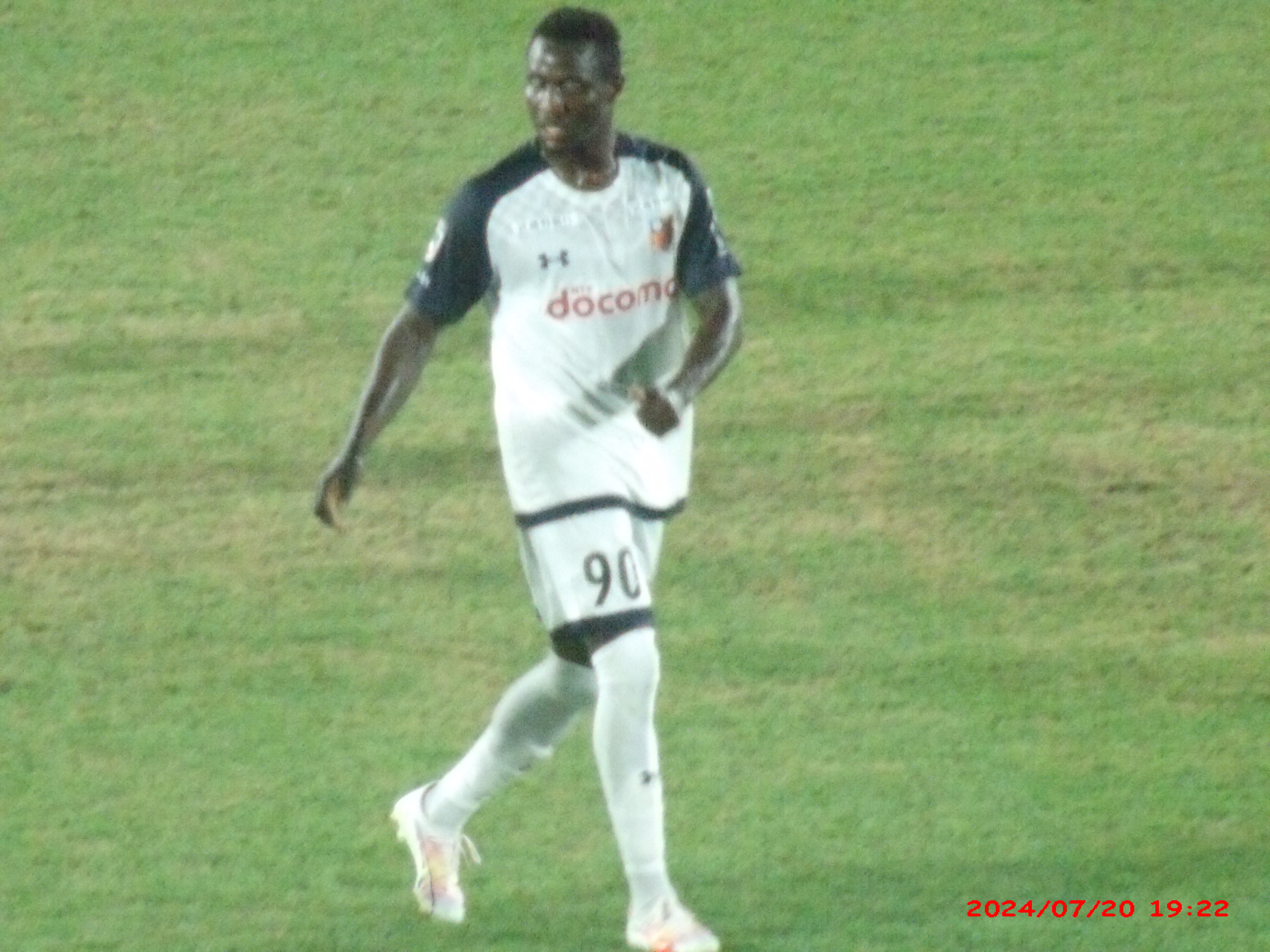
- Sunday with Omiya Ardija in 2024

Personal information
- Date of birth: 18 April 2003 (age 23)
- Height: 1.78 m (5 ft 10 in)
- Position: Forward

Team information
- Current team: Sydney FC (on loan from RB Omiya Ardija)
- Number: 9

Youth career
- –2018: IB Sports Dreams
- 2019–2021: Fukuchiyama Seibi High School

Senior career*
Years	Team	Apps	(Gls)
2022–2024	Tokushima Vortis	7	(0)
2023–2024	→ Vanraure Hachinohe (loan)	33	(5)
2024	→ Omiya Ardija (loan)	15	(5)
2025–	RB Omiya Ardija	38	(9)
2026–	→ Sydney FC (loan)	2	(1)
- * Club domestic league appearances and goals as of 20:57, 10 June 2026 (UTC)

Oriola Sunday (born 18 April 2003) is a Nigerian professional footballer who plays as a forward for A-League Men side Sydney FC, on loan from J2 League club RB Omiya Ardija.

== Career ==
Oriola Sunday, in his youth, played for IB Sports Dreams (of Abuja, Nigeria) and for Fukuchiyama Seibi High School football team. He signed his first professional contract with Tokushima Vortis on 1 February 2022. The club from Tokushima, a large city in the prefecture of the same name in Tokushima on the island of Shikoku, played in the second Japanese league, the J2 League. He made his second league debut on 19 February 2022 (matchday 1) at home against Zweigen Kanazawa. He was substituted for Akira Hamashita in the 78th minute. The game ended 0–0. After seven second-division games, he moved to third-division club Vanraure Hachinohe on loan in August 2023.

=== Sydney FC ===
On 16 August 2026, it was announced that A-League Men side Sydney FC completed the signing of Sunday on a season long loan. He made his A-League debut in the Sydney Derby in a 0–0 draw. The following week he scored his first goal for Sydney FC on Sunday 25 October in a 2–1 against Adelaide United after getting on the end of a cross by Al Hassan Toure.

== Career statistics ==
As of match played 9 May 2026

Appearances and goals by club, season and competition
Club	Season	League			National cup (Note: Includes appearance(s) in the Emperor's Cup)		League cup (Note: Includes appearances in the J.League Cup)		Total	
Club	Season	Division	Apps	Goals	Apps	Goals	Apps	Goals	Apps	Goals
Tokushima Vortis	2022	J2 League	6	0	1	0	5	0	12	0
Tokushima Vortis	2023	J2 League	1	0	0	0	0	0	1	0
Tokushima Vortis	Total		7	0	1	0	5	0	13	0
Vanraure Hachinohe (loan)	2023	J3 League	14	3	0	0	0	0	14	3
Vanraure Hachinohe (loan)	2024	J3 League	19	2	2	0	2	0	23	2
Vanraure Hachinohe (loan)	Total		33	5	2	0	2	0	37	5
Omiya Ardija (loan)	2024	J3 League	15	5	0	0	0	0	15	5
Omiya Ardija	2025	J2 League	26	6	1	0	2	1	29	7
Omiya Ardija	2026	J2/J3	12	3	—		—		12	3
Omiya Ardija	Total		53	14	1	0	2	1	56	15
Sydney FC (loan)	2026–27	A-League Men	2	1	—		—		2	1
Career total			93	19	4	0	9	1	106	20

== Honours ==
RB Omiya Ardija

- J3 League: 2024
