= Akol Akon =

Australian association football player

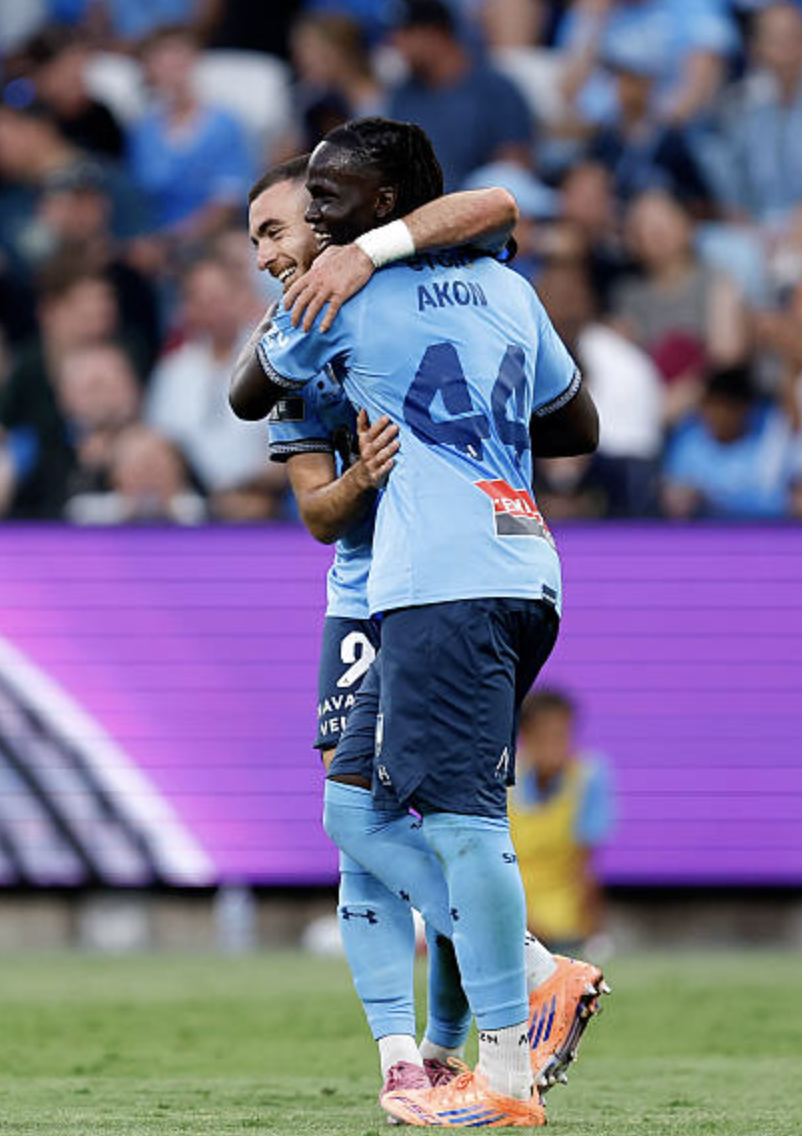
- Akon with Victor Campuzano for Sydney FC in 2026

Personal information
- Full name: Akol Diang Diang Mabuoch Akon
- Date of birth: 21 May 2009 (age 17)
- Place of birth: Sydney, Australia
- Height: 1.76 m (5 ft 9 1/2 in)
- Position: Winger

Team information
- Current team: Sydney FC
- Number: 7

Youth career
- 2021–2022: Nepean FC
- 2023: SD Raiders
- 2024–2025: Western Sydney Wanderers
- 2025–2026: Sydney FC

Senior career*
| Years | Team | Apps | (Gls) |
| 2025 | Western Sydney Wanderers NPL | 4 | (0) |
| 2025– | Sydney FC | 19 | (0) |
| 2025– | Sydney FC NPL | 6 | (1) |

International career^{‡}
| 2024– | Australia U17 | 16 | (4) |
| 2026– | Australia U23 | 2 | (1) |
- * Club domestic league appearances and goals as of 6 November 2026 ‡ National team caps and goals as of 19 November 2026

Akol Diang Diang Mabuoch Akon (born 21 May 2009) is an Australian professional soccer player who plays as a winger for A-League Men club Sydney FC. He will join MLS club Colorado Rapids after the 2026–27 season. Born and raised in Sydney, he represents the Australia national team at youth level.

== Early life ==
Akol Diang Diang Mabuoch Akon was born 21 May 2009 in Sydney, Australia, the fourth-eldest of eight children to South Sudanese parents. Raised in a Christian family, Akon grew up in the suburbs of Mount Druitt and St Marys in Western Sydney. He attended Emmaus Catholic College in Kemps Creek. Akon started playing soccer at the age of four in St Marys. He had stints for junior clubs in Melbourne and Orange before he joined the youth team of Western Sydney Wanderers. Akon supported La Liga club Barcelona and idolised Neymar growing up.

== Club career ==
=== Sydney FC ===
In June 2025, Akon signed his first professional contract for A-League Men club Sydney FC on a three-year deal. Akon made his debut in the 2025 Australia Cup on 10 August against Sydney United. He recorded one assist in the 2–0 away win and became the youngest player to debut for the club, aged 16 years and 81 days. He made his first start the next round in the penalty shoot-out loss to Auckland FC in the quarter-final. On 20 December, Akon made his league debut against Newcastle Jets and became the club's youngest player to debut in the A-League, aged 16 years and 218 days.

In his first league start on 31 January 2026, Akon recorded a hat-trick of assists in a 4–1 derby win against his former club. His side finished fifth in the regular season and would face Melbourne Victory for the elimination final. Akon became the youngest to feature and start in a finals series match when he started in the 1–0 win for the Big Blue clash. He later became the youngest to play in a Grand Final, aged 17 years and 2 days, in the 1–0 final loss to Auckland FC. At the end of the season, Akon made 15 league appearances and was given the club's Rising Star Award. Due to an extension clause in his contract, Akon renewed for another season in July.

In the first round of the 2026 Australia Cup, Akon recorded another hat-trick of assists in a 5–1 win over Bayswater City. His side was later knocked out by Melbourne Victory in the semi final. For the 2026–27 season, Akon changed his squad number from 44 to 7. He made his first goal contribution with an assist in a 4–1 win against Central Coast Mariners on 6 November.

=== Colorado Rapids ===
In September 2026, Akon signed on a four-year contract, with an option to extend for a year, with MLS club Colorado Rapids for an undisclosed fee. Due to a FIFA international transfer rule that prevents under-18 players from moving to a foreign club, he will join the club after the 2026–27 season at Sydney FC. The transfer fee was reported to be an initial A$1.5 million that will later rise to A$2.5 million with a sell-on clause attached. It is the largest fee received for a teenager in Sydney FC history.

== International career ==
=== Australia U-17 (Joeys) ===
In July 2024, Akon received his first call-up to the Australia under-17 squad for a three-match tour in Honiara, Solomon Islands. He started in his first match for his country against Solomon Islands on 15 August. He played the next two games against Solomon Islands, and Vanuatu.

After he was included in a training camp in January 2025, Akon was named in the under-17 squad for a friendly tournemount held at Emirates Club Stadium in the United Arab Emirates. In the second game against Saudi Arabia, Akon scored a hat-trick in the first-half of a 4–0 win. Australia won the tournament that spanned for a week in February with two wins and one draw. Akon was called up to the 23-player squad for the AFC U17 Asian Cup held in April. He featured in all three group matches as Australia failed to progress to the knockout stage. In May, Akon was recalled to the squad to take part in an friendly under-16 tournament held in Hohhot, China. He featured in all three matches and started in the matches against Vietnam, and Saudi Arabia.

In August, Akon was named in the 20-player squad for a friendly tournament in Niigata, Japan. Akon was later called up to take part in the qualification stage of the 2026 AFC U17 Asian Cup but withdrew from the squad due to injury in late-November. He was recalled to the squad for the Asian Cup but withdrew again to play in the A-League Grand Final.

Akon was named in the squad for the 2026 FIFA U17 World Cup. His call-up was initially blocked by his club Sydney FC who faced heavy criticism for the decision. However, Sydney FC subsequently confirmed Akon's availability for the World Cup on 22 October. In the opening group stage match, Akon was named player of the match and involved in the two goals scored against Argentina on 19 November. He forced an own goal with a deflected shot for the opener before he scored the second to seal a 2–0 win.

=== Australia U-23 (Olyroos) ===
In October, Akon was called up to the Australia under-23 squad for a two-match friendly against South Korea. He played both matches and scored in the second meeting of a 2–2 draw on 6 October.

== Player profile ==
=== Style of play ===
Akon can play either as a winger or striker though he often plays on the wing. He is described to have "uncommon physical maturity" and is known for his pace and flair. On the flank, he leans into a direct style of dribbling, which is described as "fearless" by Ufuk Talay, and tends to dribble past defenders in the final third. He has been praised for his maturity in his decision-making, defensive positioning, work rate, and discipline off the ball.

=== Reception ===
Akon is described as one of the brightest young talents in Australia since his breakout season at the age of 16. He was named among the 60 best young talents in the world by the English newspaper The Guardian.

== Career statistics ==
=== Club ===
| Club | Season | League | | | Cup (Note: Includes appearance(s) in the Australia Cup) | | Other | | Total | |
| Club | Season | Division | Apps | Goals | Apps | Goals | Apps | Goals | Apps | Goals |
|---|---|---|---|---|---|---|---|---|---|---|
| Sydney FC | 2025–26 | A-League Men | 11 | 0 | 2 | 0 | 4 (Note: Appearances in A-League Finals) | 0 | 17 | 0 |
| Sydney FC | 2026–27 | A-League Men | 4 | 0 | 3 | 0 | 0 | 0 | 7 | 0 |
| Career total | | | 15 | 0 | 5 | 0 | 4 | 0 | 24 | 0 |

=== International ===
| National team | Year | Apps | Goals |
|---|---|---|---|
| Australia U17 | 2024 | 3 | 0 |
| Australia U17 | 2025 | 12 | 3 |
| Australia U23 | 2026 | 2 | 1 |
