= 2022 Sydney Super Cup =

Tournament details
- Venues: 3
- Dates: 17–23 November 2022
- Teams: 4

Final positions
- Champions: (England) Everton
- Runners-up: (Scotland) Celtic

Tournament statistics
- Matches played: 3
- Goals scored: 9 (3 per match)
- Attendance: 74,368 (24,789 per match)
- Top goal scorer(s): (England) Anthony Gordon (3 goals)

The 2022 Sydney Super Cup was the first edition of the friendly football series Sydney Super Cup. The series were held from 17 to 23 November 2022, featuring Australian sides Sydney FC and Western Sydney Wanderers alongside invitees Celtic and Everton during a pause in domestic football leagues prior to the 2022 FIFA World Cup. Rangers were originally scheduled to participate alongside Glasgow rivals Celtic, but withdrew on 31 March 2022, replaced by English Premier League side Everton.

== Venues ==
Sydney
Accor Stadium	Allianz Stadium	CommBank Stadium
Capacity: 82,000	Capacity: 42,500	Capacity: 30,000

== Matches ==
17 November 2022
19:45 AEDT

Sydney FC (Australia)	2–1	(Scotland) Celtic
Mak 26'; Burgess 60'	Report	Furuhashi 24'

Allianz Stadium, Sydney
Attendance: 18,725
Referee: Alex King
20 November 2022
14:45 AEDT

Everton (England)	0–0	(Scotland) Celtic
	Report
Penalties
Keane (penalty scored); Cannon (penalty scored); Patterson (penalty scored); Mills (penalty missed); Gordon (penalty scored)	4–2	(penalty missed) Giakoumakis; (penalty missed) Hatate; (penalty scored) Forrest; (penalty scored) Abada

Stadium Australia, Sydney
Attendance: 41,121
Referee: Jarred Gillett
23 November 2022
19:45 AEDT

Western Sydney Wanderers (Australia)	1–5	(England) Everton
Najjarine 17'	Report	Maupay 14'; Gordon 30', 59', 90'; Cannon 66'

CommBank Stadium, Sydney
Attendance: 14,522
Referee: Adam Kersey
