= Sydney Super Cup =

Australian association football friendly

The Sydney Super Cup is a football friendly trophy series held in Sydney, Australia.

The competition generally features Sydney FC and Western Sydney Wanderers alongside invitee clubs.

The first edition was held in 2022 with Celtic and Everton. It was held again in 2026 alongside Chelsea's men's and women's team, Tottenham Hotspur and also featured the A-Leagues All Stars Women.

== Editions ==
Ed.	Year	Teams
1	2022	(Australia) Sydney FC (Australia) Western Sydney Wanderers (Scotland) Celtic (England) Everton
2	2026	(Australia) Sydney FC (Australia) Western Sydney Wanderers (Australia) A-Leagues All Stars Women (England) Chelsea (England) Chelsea Women (England) Tottenham Hotspur

== Results by clubs ==
Men's Performances
Club	Titles	Runner-up	Seasons won	Seasons runner-up
(England) Everton	1	0	2022	—
(England) Tottenham Hotspur	1	0	2026	—
(England) Chelsea	0	1	—	2026
(Scotland) Celtic	0	1	—	2022
