= Bozhidar Kraev =

Bulgarian footballer

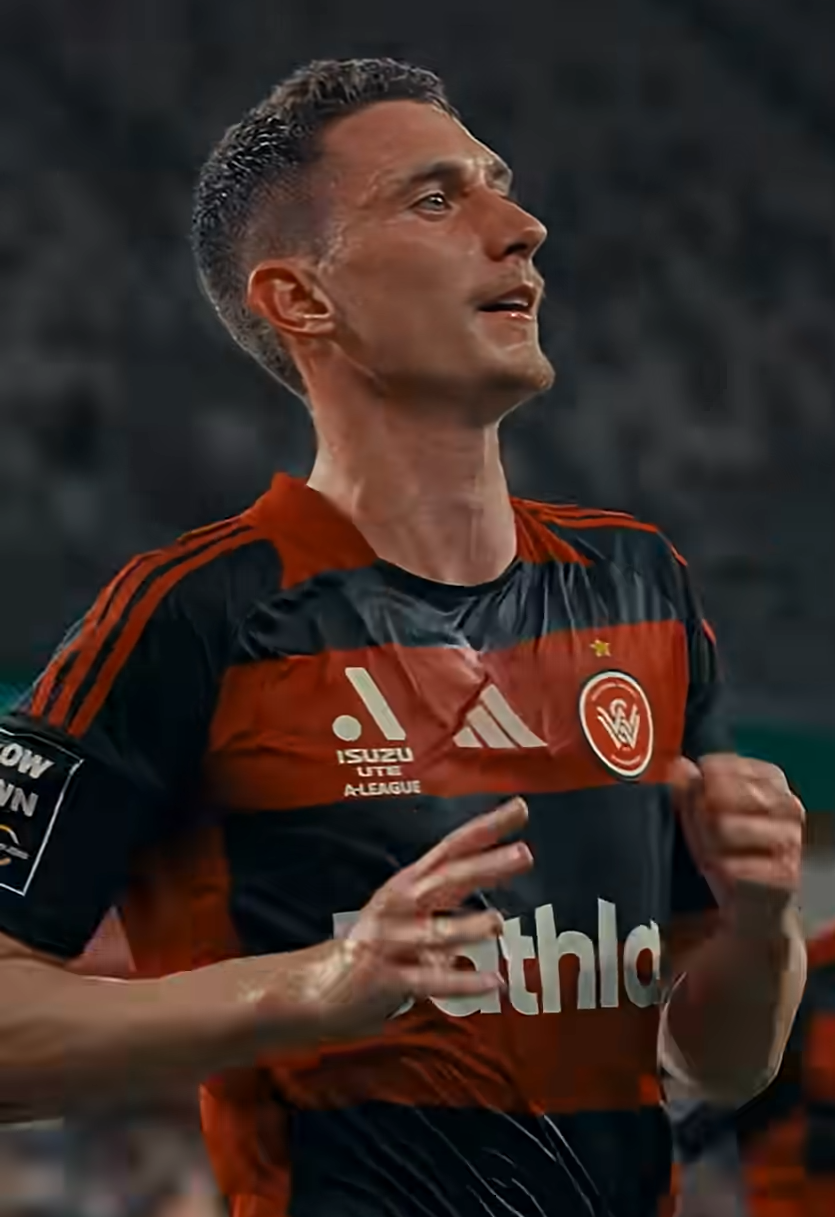
- Kraev with Western Sydney Wanderers in 2026

Personal information
- Full name: Bozhidar Boykov Kraev
- Date of birth: 23 June 1997 (age 29)
- Place of birth: Vratsa, Bulgaria
- Height: 1.89 m (6 ft 2 in)
- Positions: Midfielder; second striker

Team information
- Current team: Lee Man
- Number: 10

Youth career
- 2003–2008: Botev Vratsa
- 2008–2010: Vilafranca
- 2010–2012: Chavdar Etropole
- 2012–2013: Botev Vratsa
- 2013–2014: Levski Sofia

Senior career*
Years	Team	Apps	(Gls)
2014–2017	Levski Sofia	83	(22)
2017–2022	Midtjylland	38	(2)
2019–2020	→ Gil Vicente (loan)	32	(8)
2021	→ Famalicão (loan)	14	(1)
2022–2024	Wellington Phoenix	54	(13)
2024–2026	Western Sydney Wanderers	50	(13)
2026–	Lee Man	6	(3)

International career^{‡}
2012	Bulgaria U17	3	(0)
2014–2016	Bulgaria U19	9	(1)
2016–2019	Bulgaria U21	7	(1)
2017–	Bulgaria	27	(3)
- * Club domestic league appearances and goals as of 19 October 2026 (UTC) ‡ National team caps and goals as of 6 June 2025

Bozhidar Boykov Kraev (Bulgarian: Божидар Бойков Краев, pronounced [bɔˈʒidar ˈbɔjkɔf ˈkraɛv]; born 23 June 1997) is a Bulgarian professional footballer who currently plays as an attacking midfielder and second striker for Hong Kong Premier League club Lee Man and the Bulgarian national team.

== Career ==
=== Early career ===
Born in Vratsa, at the age of six Kraev began playing football at the local club Botev Vratsa, for whom his father Boyko Kraev had also played. In 2008, he joined Hristo Stoichkov's academy in Vilafranca, Spain, as a part of a Gillette programme for young talented players, which was initiated by Stoichkov. Two years later, Kraev returned to his home country to join Chavdar Etropole. Then he spent one year with his first club Botev Vratsa. He has a brother Andrian.

=== Levski Sofia ===
In January 2013, at the age of 15, Kraev joined Levski Sofia's academy. He made his first team debut in a 1–1 league draw against Lokomotiv Plovdiv on 19 July 2014, coming on as a second-half substitute. On 23 September, he marked his first start by scoring a hat-trick in a 7–1 away win over Spartak Varna in the Bulgarian Cup. On 14 October, Kraev was named by The Guardian as one of the forty most promising young players in the world.

On 12 December 2014, Kraev signed his first professional contract, on a three-year deal. Two days later, he was invited for a trial at Juventus. In January 2015, Kraev also spent a week on trial at English club Manchester City.

Kraev scored his first league goal for Levski in an 8–0 home win over Haskovo on 27 February 2015. On 26 May 2015, he scored his first A Group hattrick in a 6–0 win against Marek Dupnitsa. Kraev's hattrick was the 100th in Levski's history in the Bulgarian league.

On 9 April 2017, Kraev scored four goals in a 5–0 win over Lokomotiv Plovdiv, thereby becoming the youngest player in Levski history to score four goals in one game.

=== Midtjylland ===
On 19 June 2017, Kraev signed with Danish Superliga side Midtjylland on a five-year deal for a reported fee of €500,000. He made his debut for the team in a Europa League match against Derry City coming on as a substitute in the 73rd minute and scoring a goal 10 minutes later. On 12 April 2018, Kraev scored twice in a 2–1 win against Hobro IK and qualified his team for the cup's semifinals after coming on as a substitute in the 77th minute and scoring both goals in the game's added time. Three days later, he scored his first league goal in a 2–1 win against FC Nordsjælland.

Kraev was part of the squad that won the Danish Cup and the Danish Superliga for Midtjylland during his stay at the Herning club.

On 22 June 2019, Kraev was sent on a season-long deal at the Portuguese Primeira Liga team Gil Vicente. Kraev made his debut for the team in a Taça da Liga match against Aves, providing an assist for the first goal and later scored the winning goal in the 90th minute for a 3–2 win. A week later, on 10 August, Kraev made his league debut, playing a full match against Porto, providing the winning goal in the 77th minute, for a 2–1 win over one of the league favorites.

On 11 January 2021, Kraev was sent on a loan with option to buy to Portuguese Primeira Liga team Famalicão, until the end of the season.

On 22 May 2022, Midtjylland confirmed that Kraev was one out of seven players, whose contracts had come to an end, and therefore would leave the club.

=== Wellington Phoenix ===
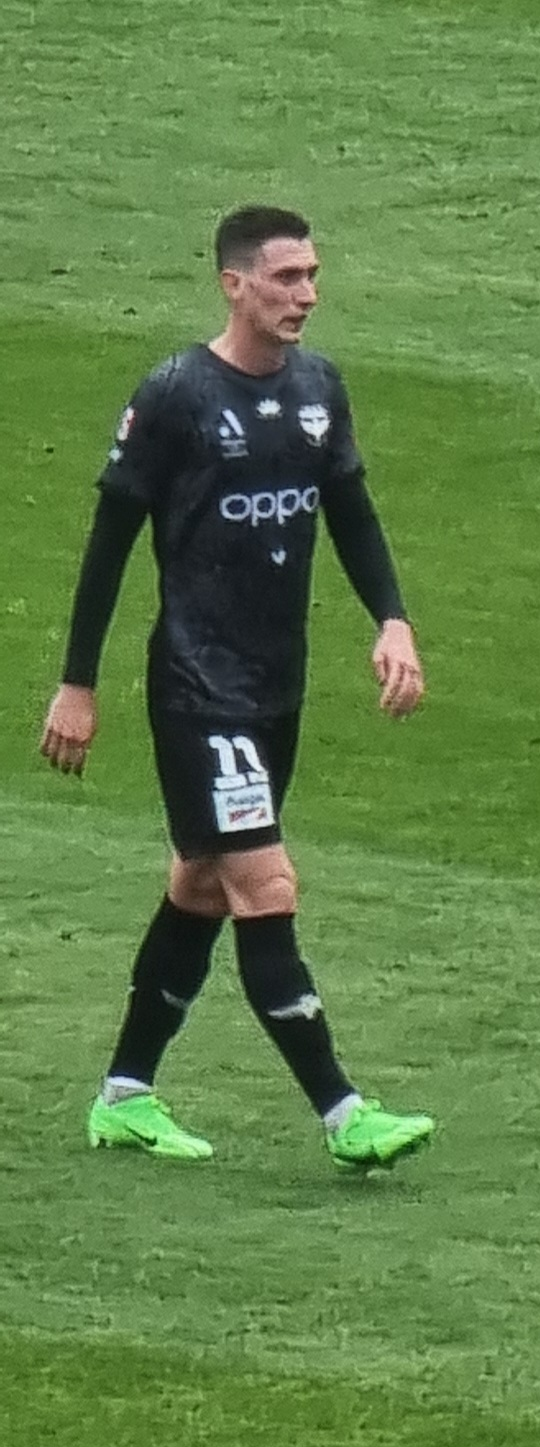
Kraev playing for the Wellington Phoenix in 2024.

On 22 July 2022 the Wellington Phoenix confirmed they had signed Kraev on a two-year deal. Kraev made his Phoenix debut on 3 August, scoring in a 4–0 win over Devonport City Strikers in the Australia Cup.

=== Western Sydney Wanderers ===
On 16 July 2024, Kraev signed a two-year deal with the Western Sydney Wanderers.

=== Lee Man ===
On 11 July 2026, Kraev joined Hong Kong Premier League club Lee Man.

== International career ==
In March 2016, Kraev was in the starting lineup of Bulgaria U19 for the 0–1 defeats from Belgium U19 and Croatia U19. On 13 May 2016 he was included in the Bulgaria U21 squad for the 2016 Toulon Tournament.

In November 2016, Kraev received his first call-up to the senior Bulgaria squad for a 2018 FIFA World Cup qualifying match against Belarus. He remained on the bench for the game. On 25 March 2017, Kraev made his complete debut for the team coming on as a substitute during the 2–0 home win over Netherlands for the 2018 FIFA World Cup qualification. On 6 September 2018, he scored 2 goals against Slovenia in the UEFA Nations' League, helping his country to 3 points.

== Career statistics ==
=== Club ===
As of match played 26 March 2024

Appearances and goals by club, season and competition
Club	Season	League			Cup		Continental		Other		Total	
Club	Season	Division	Apps	Goals	Apps	Goals	Apps	Goals	Apps	Goals	Apps	Goals
Levski Sofia	2014–15	A Group	19	6	8	3	—		—		27	9
Levski Sofia	2015–16	A Group	27	4	2	2	—		—		29	6
Levski Sofia	2016–17	First League	35	11	1	0	0	0	—		36	11
Levski Sofia	Total		81	21	11	5	0	0	—		92	26
Midtjylland	2017–18	Danish Superliga	17	1	2	3	3 (Note: Appearance(s) in UEFA Europa League)	1	—		22	5
Midtjylland	2018–19	Danish Superliga	12	0	1	0	1	0	—		14	0
Midtjylland	2020–21	Danish Superliga	9	1	0	0	7 (Note: Appearance(s) in UEFA Champions League)	0	—		16	1
Midtjylland	2021–22	Danish Superliga	0	0	1	0	0	0	—		1	0
Midtjylland	Total		38	2	4	3	11	1	—		53	6
Gil Vicente (loan)	2019–20	Primeira Liga	30	7	1	0	—		2 (Note: Appearance(s) in Taça da Liga)	1	33	8
Famalicão (loan)	2020–21	Primeira Liga	14	1	0	0	—		—		14	1
Wellington Phoenix	2022–23	A-League Men	26	7	3	1	—		—		29	8
Wellington Phoenix	2023–24	A-League Men	21	5	2	0	—		—		23	5
Wellington Phoenix	Total		47	12	5	1	—		—		52	13
Career total			210	43	21	9	6	1	2	1	244	54

=== International ===
As of match played 6 June 2025

Appearances and goals by national team and year
National team	Year	Apps	Goals
Bulgaria	2017	4	0
Bulgaria	2018	5	2
Bulgaria	2019	5	0
Bulgaria	2020	8	1
Bulgaria	2021	2	0
Bulgaria	2025	3	0
Total		27	3

Score and result list Bulgaria's goal tally first.

#	Date	Venue	Opponent	Score	Result	Competition
1.	6 September 2018	Stožice Stadium, Ljubljana, Slovenia	Slovenia	1–0	2–1	2018–19 UEFA Nations League C
2.	6 September 2018	Stožice Stadium, Ljubljana, Slovenia	Slovenia	2–1	2–1	2018–19 UEFA Nations League C
3.	3 September 2020	Vasil Levski National Stadium, Sofia, Bulgaria	Republic of Ireland	1–0	1–1	2020–21 UEFA Nations League B

== Personal life ==
Bozhidar is the son of Boyko Kraev, a former professional footballer who played for Botev Vratsa, and brother of Andrian Kraev, footballer for Levski Sofia.

== Honours ==
FC Midtjylland

- Danish Superliga: 2017–18
- Danish Cup: 2018–19

Individual

- Best progressing young player in Bulgarian football: 2014, 2015
- A-Leagues All Star: 2024
