= 2024 A-Leagues All Stars Women game =

2024 A-Leagues All Star Women game
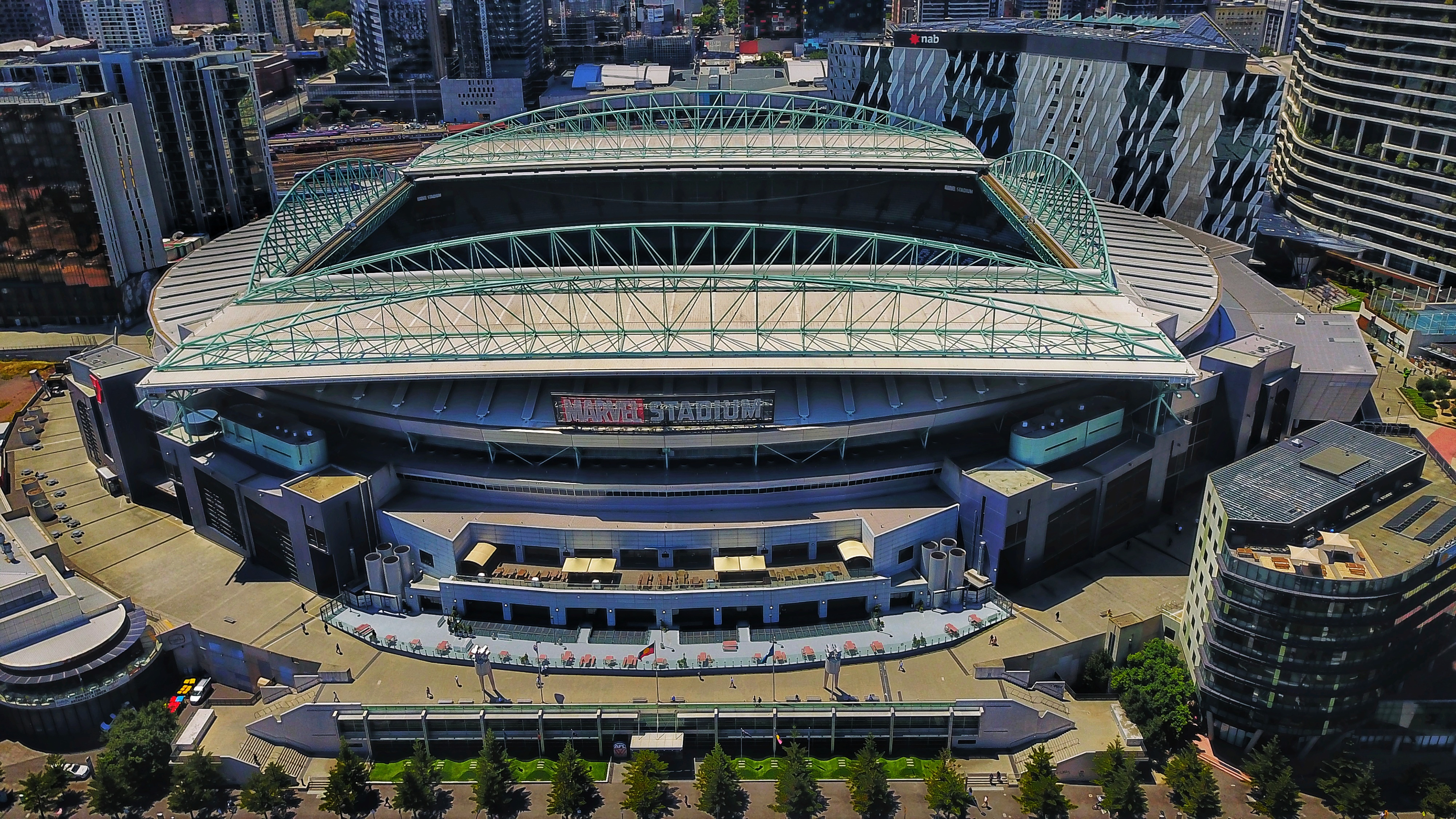
- The event took place at Marvel Stadium
- Event: 2023–24 A-League Women
A-Leagues All Stars Women	Arsenal
(Australia) (New Zealand)	(England)
0	1
- Date: 24 May 2024
- Venue: Marvel Stadium, Melbourne, Australia
- Referee: Casey Reibelt
- Attendance: 42,120

The 2024 A-Leagues All Stars Women game was an exhibition soccer match that was played on 24 May 2024, featuring an all-star team of the A-League against Super League club Arsenal at Docklands Stadium in Melbourne, Australia as part of Global Football Week Melbourne. It was the first edition of the A-Leagues All Stars game and the fourth of the A-Leagues All Stars Game.

== Background ==
In March 2024, the Australian Professional Leagues (APL) announced three fixtures that would include the A-Leagues All Stars Game at Marvel Stadium in Melbourne as part of Global Football Week Melbourne. The inaugural A-Leagues All Stars team was played against Super League club Arsenal on 24 May 2024 after the men's game (who played Premier League club Newcastle United). It will be the first time the Arsenal women has played in Australia. The official kit partner was Kappa, with the broadcast televised in Australia on 10 Bold and Paramount+.

== Squads ==
=== A-League All Stars Women squad ===
The A-League All Stars squad consisted of 19 players, including two goalkeepers, and was selected by coaching staff. Alex Chidiac and Hannah Wilkinson were announced on 23 April 2024 as the first two players to be selected in the squad as voted by fans. On 26 April, Joe Montemurro was announced as head coach, with Kat Smith and Emily Husband as assistant coaches, and Melissa Maizels appointed as goalkeeping coach. The squad was announced on 9 May. Of the 19 players selected, five were part of the Australian squad in the 2023 FIFA World Cup, and four were from Sydney FC (the club that won the Grand Final on 4 May).

=== Arsenal squad ===
Arsenal announced their 19-player squad on 20 May, with Australian internationals Steph Catley, Kyra Cooney-Cross and Caitlin Foord included.

== Officials ==
The referee for the match was Casey Reibelt. Emma Kocbek and Maggie Price were named as assistant referees with Georgia Ghirardello as the fourth official.

=== A-Leagues All Stars Women squad ===
Note: Flags indicate national team as defined under FIFA eligibility rules; some limited exceptions apply. Players may hold more than one non-FIFA nationality.

No.	Pos.	Nation	Player
1	GK	AUS	Lydia Williams (Melbourne Victory)
2	DF	AUS	Danika Matos (Western Sydney Wanderers)
4	DF	AUS	Grace Maher (Western United)
5	DF	NZL	Michaela Foster (Wellington Phoenix)
6	DF	NZL	Rebekah Stott (Melbourne City, captain)
7	FW	AUS	Sophie Harding (Western Sydney Wanderers)
8	MF	AUS	Elise Kellond-Knight (Melbourne Victory)
9	MF	AUS	Rhianna Pollicina (Melbourne City)
10	MF	AUS	Alex Chidiac (Melbourne Victory)
11	FW	AUS	Cortnee Vine (Sydney FC)

No.	Pos.	Nation	Player
13	MF	AUS	Tameka Yallop (Brisbane Roar)
15	MF	AUS	Mackenzie Hawkesby (Sydney FC)
16	FW	NZL	Hannah Wilkinson (Melbourne City)
17	FW	AUS	Kyah Simon (Central Coast Mariners)
18	DF	USA	Kayla Morrison (Melbourne Victory)
20	FW	AUS	Princess Ibini (Sydney FC)
22	DF	AUS	Alana Cerne (Western United)
23	FW	AUS	Michelle Heyman (Canberra United, vice-captain)
99	GK	AUS	Jada Whyman (Sydney FC)

=== Arsenal squad ===
Note: Flags indicate national team as defined under FIFA eligibility rules; some limited exceptions apply. Players may hold more than one non-FIFA nationality.

No.	Pos.	Nation	Player
2	DF	USA	Emily Fox
7	DF	AUS	Steph Catley
10	MF	SCO	Kim Little (captain)
12	MF	NOR	Frida Maanum
15	DF	IRL	Katie McCabe
19	FW	AUS	Caitlin Foord
21	MF	NED	Victoria Pelova
22	MF	DEN	Kathrine Møller Kühl
23	FW	ENG	Alessia Russo
24	FW	CAN	Cloé Lacasse

No.	Pos.	Nation	Player
29	DF	ENG	Teyah Goldie
32	MF	AUS	Kyra Cooney-Cross
40	GK	ENG	Naomi Williams
53	FW	ENG	Vivienne Lia
56	MF	ENG	Freya Godfrey
60	MF	ENG	Laila Harbert
61	FW	ENG	Maddy Earl
62	DF	ENG	Katie Reid
86	GK	FRA	Sarah Bouhaddi

=== Criticism ===
After the announcement of Montemurro, Lisa De Vanna criticised the decision to select a coach not employed in the A-League Women, suggesting that it is an "insult to all the coaches who have put in the effort and remained loyal" in Australia. Former Central Coast Mariners player Daniel McBreen supported this notion, stating that an A-League Women coach should have been "honoured" with the role.

== Match ==
=== Details ===
24 May 2024
20:05 AEST

A-Leagues All Stars Women	0–1	(England) Arsenal
	Report	Russo 40'

Marvel Stadium, Melbourne
Attendance: 42,120
Referee: Casey Reibelt
