= Apostolos Stamatelopoulos =

Australian soccer player

Personal information
- Full name: Apostolos Vasilios Stamatelopoulos
- Date of birth: 9 April 1999 (age 27)
- Place of birth: North Adelaide, South Australia, Australia
- Height: 1.84 m (6 ft 1/2 in)
- Position: Striker

Team information
- Current team: Macarthur FC
- Number: 16

Youth career
- 2013–2016: Adelaide Comets
- 2016–2017: Adelaide United NPL

Senior career*
Years	Team	Apps	(Gls)
2015–2016	Adelaide Comets	16	(2)
2016–2019	Adelaide United NPL	46	(13)
2017–2019	Adelaide United	15	(4)
2019–2021	Western United	12	(0)
2021	Newcastle Jets	12	(3)
2021–2022	Rodos	17	(6)
2022–2023	PAS Giannina	17	(0)
2023–2024	Newcastle Jets	25	(17)
2024–2026	Motherwell	31	(11)
2026	→ Sydney FC (loan)	10	(2)
2026–	Macarthur FC	0	(0)

International career^{‡}
2018–2019	Australia U20	4	(0)
2024–	Australia	1	(0)
- * Club domestic league appearances and goals as of 26 April 2026 ‡ National team caps and goals as of 7 October 2025

Apostolos Vasilios Stamatelopoulos (born 9 April 1999) is an Australian professional soccer player who plays as a striker for A-League Men club Macarthur FC and for the Australia national team.

== Early life ==
Stamatelopoulos was born on 9 April 1999 in North Adelaide, a suburb of Adelaide, South Australia. He is of Greek descent.

== Club career ==
=== Adelaide United ===
On 22 September 2017, Stamatelopoulos signed a 2-year scholarship contract with Adelaide United. In his fourth senior appearance for the club, he scored his first A-League goal off the bench to equalise in an away match against Western Sydney Wanderers on 10 January 2018.

=== Western United ===
On 20 March 2019, it was announced that Stamatelopoulos had signed for new A-League club Western United. On 25 January 2021, the club announced that Stamatelopoulos had departed.

=== Newcastle Jets ===
A few days after leaving Western United, it was announced Stamatelopoulos would join Newcastle Jets when the transfer window opens on 16 February. Stamatelopoulos made his debut for the Jets as a substitute in a loss to Wellington on 28 February.

In July 2023 Stamatelopoulos returned to Newcastle Jets on two year deal.

=== Motherwell ===
On 30 July 2024, Scottish Premiership club Motherwell announced the signing of Stamatelopoulos from Newcastle Jets for an undisclosed fee, on a contract until 2027.

==== Loan to Sydney FC ====
On 10 February 2026, Stamatelopoulos returned to Australia joining Sydney FC on loan for the remainder of the 2025–26 season, with the club having a purchase option to make the deal permanent. His debut for the club came three days later against former side Adelaide United. On 7 March 2026, Stamatelopoulos would score his first goal for the club against Big Blue rivals Melbourne Victory.

On 8 September 2026, Motherwell announced that Stamatelopoulos had left the club by mutual agreement to pursue opportunities elsewhere.

== International career ==
Stamatelopoulos made his debut for the Australia national team on 11 June 2024 in a World Cup qualifier against Palestine at the HBF Park. He substituted Adam Taggart in the 65th minute of Australia's 5–0 victory.

== Career statistics ==
As of match played 26 April 2026

Club	Season	League			Cup		Continental		League Cup		Total	
Club	Season	Division	Apps	Goals	Apps	Goals	Apps	Goals	Apps	Goals	Apps	Goals
Adelaide United	2017–18	A-League	7	1	0	0	0	0	—		7	1
Adelaide United	2018–19	A-League	8	3	4	0	—		—		12	3
Adelaide United	Total		15	4	4	0	0	0	0	0	19	4
Western United	2019–20	A-League	12	0	0	0	—		—		12	0
Newcastle Jets	2020–21	A-League	12	3	0	0	—		—		12	3
Rodos	2021–22	Super League Greece 2	4	6	0	0	—		—		4	6
PAS Giannina	2022–23	Super League Greece	17	0	0	0	—		—		17	0
Newcastle Jets	2023–24	A-League Men	25	17	1	0	—		—		26	17
Motherwell	2024–25	Scottish Premiership	16	5	0	0	—		2	0	18	5
Motherwell	2025–26	Scottish Premiership	19	6	1	0	—		7	1	27	7
Motherwell	Total		35	11	1	0			9	1	55	12
Sydney FC (loan)	2025–26	A-League Men	10	2	0	0	—		—		10	2
Career total			145	47	6	0	0	0	9	1	160	148

== Honours ==
=== Adelaide United ===
- FFA Cup: 2018

=== Individual ===
- PFA A-League Team of the Season: 2023–24
- A-Leagues All Star: 2024
