= Jordan Courtney-Perkins =

Australian footballer (born 2002)

Personal information
- Full name: Jordan Alan Courtney-Perkins
- Date of birth: 6 November 2002 (age 24)
- Place of birth: Adelaide, South Australia, Australia
- Height: 1.89 m (6 ft 2 in)
- Position: Left back

Team information
- Current team: Sydney FC
- Number: 4

Youth career
- Newmarket SFC
- Brisbane City
- 2018–2019: Brisbane Roar

Senior career*
Years	Team	Apps	(Gls)
2019–2021	Brisbane Roar NPL	23	(0)
2019–2021	Brisbane Roar	15	(0)
2021–2023	Raków Częstochowa	2	(0)
2022	→ Warta Poznań (loan)	5	(0)
2022–2023	→ Brisbane Roar (loan)	25	(1)
2023–	Sydney FC	61	(7)

International career^{‡}
2018–2019	Australia U17	5	(0)
2021–2024	Australia U23	14	(0)
Medal record
Men's football
Representing Australia
WAFF U-23 Championship
Runner-up	2024 Saudi Arabia
- * Club domestic league appearances and goals as of 26 April 2026 ‡ National team caps and goals as of 6 November 2024

Jordan Alan Courtney-Perkins (born 6 November 2002) is an Australian professional footballer who plays as a left back for Sydney FC.

== Club career ==
=== Brisbane Roar ===
Courtney-Perkins was part of the 2018-19 Y-League championship winning Brisbane Roar Youth team. He started and played the full 90 minutes as the Young Roar beat Western Sydney Wanderers Youth 3–1 in the 2019 Y-League Grand Final on 1 February 2019.

On 5 August 2019, Courtney-Perkins signed a scholarship contract with the Roar for the 2019–20 season. Two days later, he made his professional debut in a Round of 32 clash against Sydney FC in the 2019 FFA Cup, playing a full game in a 2–0 victory. In doing so, he became the youngest player to play for the Brisbane Roar at 16 years, 9 months and 1 days.

=== Raków Częstochowa ===
On 29 June 2021, it was announced that Courtney-Perkins would join the Polish side Raków Częstochowa, becoming the first Australian to play in Poland's Ekstraklasa since Jake McGing. He made his debut for the club on 1 August, in the game against Jagiellonia Białystok as a starter in its 0–3 away defeat.

==== Loan to Warta ====
On 5 February 2022, Courtney-Perkins was loaned until the end of the season to another Ekstraklasa side Warta Poznań.

==== Loan to Brisbane Roar ====
Courtney-Perkins was loaned back to Brisbane Roar for the 2022-23 A-League season. Courtney-Perkins impressed in his season back at the Roar, before departing at the end of his season long loan.

=== Sydney FC ===
On 15 September 2023, it was announced that A-League Men side Sydney FC completed the signing of Courtney-Perkins on a three-year deal.

== International career ==
Courtney-Perkins was first selected for the Joeys in 2017. He was subsequently selected in the squad for the 2018 AFC U-16 Championship, where he started in the Joeys' 3–2 quarter final win over Indonesia, a win which qualified Australia for the 2019 FIFA U-17 World Cup. On 2 October 2019, Courtney-Perkins was selected in the Joeys squad for the 2019 FIFA U-17 World Cup. He started in all of the Joeys' Group B games, conceding a penalty as the Joey's fought back to secure a 2–2 draw against Hungary. He started in their Round of 16 clash with France on 7 November 2019, losing 4–0 and being eliminated from the competition. In June 2023, he took part in the Maurice Revello Tournament in France with Australia.

== Personal life ==
Courtney-Perkins attended Anglican Church Grammar School and was a member of the First XI who won the 2019 GPS Football Premiership, the school's first win in the competition.

== Career statistics ==
As of match played 26 April 2026

Club	Season	League			Cup		Continental		Total	
Club	Season	Division	Apps	Goals	Apps	Goals	Apps	Goals	Apps	Goals
Brisbane Roar	2019–20	A-League Men	7	0	2	0	—		9	0
Brisbane Roar	2020–21	A-League Men	8	0	—		—		8	0
Brisbane Roar	Total		15	0	2	0	0	0	17	0
Raków Częstochowa	2021–22	Ekstraklasa	2	0	1	0	—		3	0
Warta Poznań (loan)	2021–22	Ekstraklasa	5	0	0	0	—		5	0
Brisbane Roar (loan)	2022–23	A-League Men	25	1	0	0	—		25	1
Sydney FC	2023–24	A-League Men	26	3	2	0	—		28	3
Sydney FC	2024–25	A-League Men	25	4	1	0	11	0	37	4
Sydney FC	2025–26	A-League Men	10	0	2	0	—		12	0
Sydney FC	Total		61	7	5	0	11	0	77	5
Career total			108	8	8	0	11	0	127	8

== Honours ==
=== Player ===
Brisbane Roar

- Y-League: 2018–19

Raków Częstochowa

- Polish Cup: 2021–22

Raków Częstochowa II

- IV liga Silesia I: 2021–22

Sydney FC

- Australia Cup: 2023

Australia U-23

- WAFF U-23 Championship: runner-up 2024

=== Individual ===
- A-Leagues All Star: 2024
