= 2026 Sydney Super Cup =

Tournament details
- Venues: 2
- Dates: 28 July – 12 August 2026
- Teams: 6

Tournament statistics
- Matches played: 4
- Goals scored: 18 (4.5 per match)
- Attendance: 178,716 (44,679 per match)
- Top goal scorer(s): (Brazil) João Pedro (3 goals)

The 2026 Sydney Super Cup was the second edition of the friendly soccer series Sydney Super Cup, held in Sydney, New South Wales, Australia. The series was held from 28 July to 12 August 2026, featuring Australian sides Sydney FC and Western Sydney Wanderers alongside invitees Chelsea's men's and women's teams, Tottenham Hotspur, and also featured the A-Leagues All Stars Women.

== Venues ==
Sydney
Accor Stadium	Allianz Stadium
Capacity: 82,000	Capacity: 42,500

== Matches ==
=== Western Sydney Wanderers vs Chelsea ===
28 July 2026
19:45 AEST

Western Sydney Wanderers (Australia)	4–6	(England) Chelsea
Pantazopoulos 14'; Hammond 32'; Scicluna 62'; Lual 78'	Report	Satpayev 6'; Essugo 38'; Gittens 38'; João Pedro 80', 85', 89'

Accor Stadium, Sydney Olympic Park
Attendance: 50,000
Referee: Daniel Elder

=== Sydney FC vs Tottenham Hotspur ===
29 July 2026

Sydney FC (Australia)	1–1	(England) Tottenham Hotspur
Sekine 55'	Report	Tel 29'
Penalties
G. Popovic (penalty scored); Touré (penalty scored); Lacey (penalty missed); A. Popović (penalty missed)	2–4	(penalty scored) Williams-Barnett; (penalty scored) Tonali; (penalty scored) Robertson; (penalty missed) Donley; (penalty scored) Scarlett

Allianz Stadium, Moore Park
Attendance: 26,216
Referee: Adam Kersey

=== Chelsea vs Tottenham Hotspur ===
1 August 2026
19:45 AEST

Chelsea (England)	1–2	(England) Tottenham Hotspur
Estêvão 21'	Report	Tonali 17'; Richarlison 90+2'

Accor Stadium, Sydney Olympic Park
Attendance: 80,363
Referee: Alex King

=== A-Leagues All Stars Women vs Chelsea ===
12 August 2026
19:45 AEST

A-Leagues All Stars Women (Australia) (New Zealand)	0–3	(England) Chelsea Women
	Report	Baltimore 9'; Nusken 12'; Potter 70'

Allianz Stadium, Moore Park
Attendance: 22,137
Referee: Isabella Mossin
