= A-Leagues All Stars Game =

A-League All Stars
- Founded: 2013
- Region: Australia (AFC)
- Teams: 2
- Broadcaster: Network 10

The A-Leagues All Star Game is a soccer match contested by the A-Leagues All Stars team against an invitee club. The All Stars team is made up of selected A-League Men or A-League Women players. The game is played during the footballing off-season, the first of which was held on 20 July 2013.

After the 2014 edition, the All Star Game was not held for almost a decade, before the concept was revived in 2022 and was expected to continue for at least the 2023, 2024 and 2025 A-League seasons as part of the commercial agreement with the NSW State Government to play a "Football Festival" culminating with the A-League Grand final in Sydney for those three seasons.

== A-Leagues All Stars Men ==
=== Background ===
The inaugural All Stars Game took place on 20 July 2013, against Manchester United. The A-League team was picked by an online vote by fans and by the appointed manager.

On 20 December 2013, it was confirmed that Juventus would compete against the all-star team for the 2014 game, again hosted in Sydney.

On 6 April 2022 it was announced that a third A-League All Stars match would be held against Barcelona on 25 May 2022, again in Sydney.

The 2023 edition was under negotiations with Bayern Munich to appear as the foreign club but the APL were unable to fund the multi-million dollar appearance fee.

In the fourth game in 2024 the A-League All Stars faced Premier League side Newcastle United as part of Global Football Week Melbourne, 5 days after the conclusion of the Premier League season. The game was played at Marvel Stadium, and is the first time in 10 years that United have visited Oceania.

=== Games ===
20 July 2013 2013	A-League All Stars	1–5	(England) Manchester United	Sydney
19:30 AEST	Berisha 51'	Report	Lingard 10', 54'; Welbeck 33', 70'; Van Persie 86'	Stadium: ANZ Stadium; Attendance: 83,127; Referee: Masaaki Toma (Japan)

10 August 2014 2014	A-League All Stars	2–3	(Italy) Juventus	Sydney
19:30 AEST	Carrusca 9'; Juric 76'	Report	Llorente 58'; Pogba 87'; Pepe 90+3'	Stadium: ANZ Stadium; Attendance: 55,364; Referee: Felix Brych (Germany)

25 May 2022 2022	A-Leagues All Stars	2–3	(Spain) Barcelona	Sydney
20:05 AEST	Piscopo 47'; Traoré 53'	Report	Dembélé 34'; Traoré 72'; Fati 77'	Stadium: Accor Stadium; Attendance: 70,174; Referee: Alex King (Australia)

24 May 2024 2024	A-Leagues All Stars Men	8–0	(England) Newcastle United	Melbourne
17:15 AEST	Old 5'; Milanovic 25'; Taggart 34'; Stamatelopoulos 62', 74'; Hollman 82'; Courtney-Perkins 89'; Kraev 90+2'	Report		Stadium: Marvel Stadium; Attendance: 42,120; Referee: Daniel Elder (Australia)

=== Man of the match ===
Ed.	Winner	Nationality	Position	Team	Club
2013	Robin van Persie	Netherlands	Forward	(England) Manchester United	Manchester United
2014	Thomas Broich	Germany	Midfielder	A-League All Stars	Brisbane Roar FC

== A-Leagues All Stars Women ==
=== Background ===
On 18 March 2024, it was announced that the A-League All Stars would be facing Women's Super League side Arsenal on 24 May 2024 as part of Global Football Week Melbourne, five days after the conclusion of the WSL season. The game was played at Marvel Stadium and broadcast on 10 Bold. The All Stars squad, which was coached by former A-League Women's Melbourne City and Arsenal's coach, Joe Montemurro. Arsenal won by a single goal, with a header by Alessia Russo after a cross from Vivienne Lia.

=== Games ===
24 May 2024 2024	A-Leagues All Stars Women	0–1	(England) Arsenal	Melbourne
20:05 AEST		Report	Russo 39'	Stadium: Marvel Stadium; Attendance: 42,120; Referee: Casey Reibelt (Australia)

12 August 2026 2026	A-Leagues All Stars Women	0–3	(England) Chelsea	Sydney
		Report	Baltimore 9'; Nüsken 12'; Potter 70'	Stadium: Allianz Stadium; Referee: Isabella Mossin
