= A-League Women transfers for 2025–26 season =

This is a list of Australian soccer transfers for the 2025–26 A-League Women. Only moves featuring at least one A-League Women club are listed.

== Transfers ==
All players without a flag are Australian. Clubs without a flag are clubs participating in the A-League Women.

=== Pre-season ===
Date	Name	Moving from	Moving to
21 January 2025	Sharn Freier	Brisbane Roar	(Germany) VfL Wolfsburg
17 April 2025	(Brazil) Mariel Hecher	Brisbane Roar	Retired
17 April 2025	Keeley Richards	Brisbane Roar	Retired
20 April 2025	(New Zealand) Annalie Longo	Wellington Phoenix	Retired
12 May 2025	Tianah Miro	Canberra United	(Australia) Canberra Olympic
20 May 2025	Abby Middleton	Adelaide United	(Australia) Adelaide Comets
23 May 2025	(Republic of Ireland) Sarah Rowe	Central Coast Mariners	(Australia) Collingwood (AFLW)
25 May 2025	(England) Abby Clarke	Adelaide United	Unattached
25 May 2025	Meleri Mullan	Adelaide United	Unattached
25 May 2025	Chrissy Panagaris	Adelaide United	Unattached
27 May 2025	Lara Kirkby	Adelaide United	(Germany) VfL Bochum
28 May 2025	(Singapore) Danelle Tan	Brisbane Roar	Unattached
28 May 2025	(Bulgaria) Evdokia Popadinova	Brisbane Roar	Unattached
28 May 2025	Tanaye Morris	Brisbane Roar	Unattached
28 May 2025	(United States) Anneka Lewerenz	Brisbane Roar	Unattached
30 May 2025	Casey Dumont	Perth Glory	Unattached
5 June 2025	Lily McMahon	Central Coast Mariners	(Australia) Northern Tigers
5 June 2025	Leia Puxty	Central Coast Mariners	(Australia) UNSW FC
5 June 2025	Jessica Seaman	Central Coast Mariners	(Australia) APIA Leichhardt
5 June 2025	Morgan Roberts	Perth Glory	(Australia) Gladesville Ravens
5 June 2025	(Japan) Miku Sunaga	Perth Glory	(Australia) Gladesville Ravens
5 June 2025	Claudia Valletta	Perth Glory	(Australia) Bulls FC Academy
9 June 2025	Tirana Karambasis	Adelaide United	Unattached
9 June 2025	Miranda Templeman	Perth Glory	(Australia) Alamein FC
9 June 2025	Isabella Wallhead	Perth Glory	(Australia) Heidelberg United
10 June 2025	(Dominican Republic) Lucía León	Adelaide United	Wellington Phoenix
10 June 2025	Chloe Lincoln	Western United	Brisbane Roar
12 June 2025	(United States) Ellie Walker	(Portugal) Braga	Wellington Phoenix
17 June 2025	(Canada) Kathryn Harvey	Melbourne City	Unattached
18 June 2025	(England) Faye Bryson	Sydney FC	Unattached
18 June 2025	(United States) Shea Connors	Sydney FC	Unattached
18 June 2025	Kyah Simon	Sydney FC	Unattached
18 June 2025	Beth Mason-Jones	Sydney FC	Unattached
18 June 2025	Jasmine Black	Sydney FC	(United States) George Washington Revolutionaries
18 June 2025	Margaux Chauvet	Sydney FC	(United States) Purdue Boilermakers
19 June 2025	(Netherlands) Tessel Middag	(Scotland) Rangers	Wellington Phoenix
19 June 2025	(United States) Catherine Zimmerman	Western United	(United States) Brooklyn FC
21 June 2025	Hollie Palmer	Perth Glory	(Australia) Gold Coast Knights
23 June 2025	(Portugal) Carolina Vilão	Wellington Phoenix	Unattached
24 June 2025	(New Zealand) Victoria Esson	(Scotland) Rangers	Wellington Phoenix
26 June 2025	Holly McQueen	Brisbane Roar	Unattached
26 June 2025	Sophie Harding	Western Sydney Wanderers	(United States) Fort Lauderdale United
30 June 2025	(United States) Heather Hinz	(United States) Houston Dash	Sydney FC
30 June 2025	Sofia Fante	(Australia) Sydney Uni	Sydney FC
30 June 2025	Ivana Galic	Canberra United	Unattached
30 June 2025	Chloe Carmichael	Central Coast Mariners	Unattached
30 June 2025	Ash Irwin	Central Coast Mariners	Unattached
30 June 2025	Chloe Walandouw	Newcastle Jets	Unattached
30 June 2025	Isabella Foletta	Perth Glory	Unattached
1 July 2025	(England) Jade Pennock (Note: Pennock returned from loan to her parent club Birmingham City before signing with Sporting JAX)	Central Coast Mariners	(United States) Sporting JAX
2 July 2025	Emily Gielnik	Melbourne Victory	(Mexico) Monterrey
4 July 2025	Amelia Cassar	Western Sydney Wanderers	Sydney FC (Note: Player signed a three-year contract.)
7 July 2025	Madison McComasky	Western Sydney Wanderers	(United States) Fort Lauderdale United
8 July 2025	Gemma Ferris	Western Sydney Wanderers	Unattached
8 July 2025	Paige Hayward	Western Sydney Wanderers	Unattached
8 July 2025	Talia Kapetanellis	Western Sydney Wanderers	Unattached
8 July 2025	Maya Lobo	Western Sydney Wanderers	Unattached
8 July 2025	(Japan) Aya Seino	Western Sydney Wanderers	Unattached
8 July 2025	Keely Segavcic	Western Sydney Wanderers	Unattached
9 July 2025	(United States) Alivia Kelly	Wellington Phoenix	Unattached
9 July 2025	(United States) Maya McCutcheon	Wellington Phoenix	Unattached
9 July 2025	(England) Olivia Fergusson	Wellington Phoenix	Unattached
9 July 2025	(Japan) Mebae Tanaka	Wellington Phoenix	Unattached
11 July 2025	(New Zealand) Amelia Abbott	Wellington Phoenix	Unattached
13 July 2025	(United States) Jordan Thompson	Sydney FC	(United States) Brooklyn FC
16 July 2025	Lucy Johnson	Sydney FC	Unattached
17 July 2025	(Nepal) Sabitra Bhandari	(France) Guingamp	Wellington Phoenix (Note: Player signed a two-year contract.)
23 July 2025	Milan Hammond	Newcastle Jets	Unattached
23 July 2025	(Canada) Danielle Krzyzaniak	Newcastle Jets	Unattached
23 July 2025	Sheridan Gallagher	Newcastle Jets	Unattached
23 July 2025	Bel Rolley	Newcastle Jets	Unattached
23 July 2025	(United States) Gia Vicari	Newcastle Jets	Unattached
24 July 2025	Alex Chidiac	Melbourne Victory	(Italy) Como
25 July 2025	(New Zealand) Anna Leat	(New Zealand) Eastern Suburbs	Newcastle Jets
29 July 2025	Skye Halmarick	(Australia) NWS Spirit	Sydney FC
29 July 2025	Claire Corbett	(Australia) Macarthur Rams	Sydney FC
29 July 2025	Willa Pearson	(Australia) BTH Raiders	Sydney FC
30 July 2025	Daisy Brown	(Australia) QAS	Brisbane Roar
31 July 2025	(Croatia) Bianca Galic	Central Coast Mariners	Sydney FC
31 July 2025	Jessika Nash	Central Coast Mariners	(Italy) Sassuolo
1 August 2025	(New Zealand) CJ Bott	(England) Leicester City	Wellington Phoenix
3 August 2025	(New Zealand) Ruby Nathan	Canberra United	(New Zealand) Eastern Suburbs
5 August 2025	(Philippines) Sara Eggesvik	Western United	(Norway) LSK Kvinner
5 August 2025	(New Zealand) Pia Vlok	(New Zealand) Auckland United	Wellington Phoenix
9 August 2025	(United States) Emily Pringle	Brisbane Roar	(United States) Brooklyn FC
11 August 2025 (Note: Player was released to free agency before joining new club)	Tiahna Robertson	Newcastle Jets	Sydney FC
11 August 2025	Alana Murphy	Melbourne Victory	(Germany) SC Sand
13 August 2025	(Venezuela) Mariana Speckmaier	Melbourne City	(England) Durham
13 August 2025	(Republic of Ireland) Deborah-Anne De la Harpe	Brisbane Roar	(Sweden) Norrköping
14 August 2025	(England) Danielle Turner	(England) Aston Villa	Melbourne City
14 August 2025	(United States) Sara D'Appolonia	Melbourne Victory	(Germany) SC Sand
15 August 2025	Ava Piazza	(Armenia) Pyunik	Brisbane Roar
15 August 2025	(United States) Jodi Ülkekul	(United States) Spokane Zephyr	Sydney FC
15 August 2025	Melina Ayres	Unattached	Newcastle Jets
20 August 2025	Emma Gibbon	Brisbane Roar	Unattached
22 August 2025	(Mexico) Lourdes Bosch	Melbourne City	(United States) Denver Summit
22 August 2025	Laini Freier	Brisbane Roar	Retired
22 August 2025	(Philippines) Madison Ayson	Canberra United	Sydney FC
22 August 2025	(Japan) Keiwa Hieda	Western United	(Thailand) College of Asian Scholars
22 August 2025	Shadeene Evans	Central Coast Mariners	(Thailand) College of Asian Scholars
25 August 2025	Aideen Keane	Canberra United	Melbourne City
26 August 2025	Princess Ibini	Sydney FC	(Turkey) Beşiktaş
27 August 2025	(Panama) Riley Tanner	Unattached	Sydney FC
28 August 2025	(New Zealand) Deven Jackson	Newcastle Jets	Melbourne City
28 August 2025	Lydia Williams	Melbourne Victory	Retired
29 August 2025	(United States) Rola Badawiya	Unattached	Perth Glory
29 August 2025	(Colombia) Sandra Ibarguen	Western United	Unattached
1 September 2025	Taylor Ray	Central Coast Mariners	Melbourne Victory
1 September 2025	Georgia Ritchie	Canberra United	Newcastle Jets
2 September 2025	(United States) Kennedy White	(Hungary) Győr	Melbourne Victory
2 September 2025	Holly Murray	Canberra United	Adelaide United
2 September 2025	Sienna Saveska	Western Sydney Wanderers	Melbourne Victory
3 September 2025	Chelsea Blissett	Brisbane Roar	Melbourne Victory
3 September 2025	Chloe Berryhill	Western United	(Italy) Como 1907
4 September 2025	(Japan) Nanako Sasaki	Adelaide United	Canberra United
4 September 2025	Kiera Meyers	Melbourne City	Brisbane Roar
4 September 2025	(New Zealand) Geo Candy	Melbourne Victory	Unattached
4 September 2025	(New Zealand) Marisa van der Meer	Unattached	Wellington Phoenix
5 September 2025	(New Zealand) Rebecca Lake	Wellington Phoenix	Unattached
5 September 2025	(United States) Emma Hawkins	Unattached	Canberra United
5 September 2025	Fiorina Iaria	(Australia) Football Victoria Academy	Melbourne Victory
5 September 2025	Chloe McKenzie	(Australia) Box Hill United	Melbourne Victory
5 September 2025	(United States) Payton Woodward	(Australia) Brunswick Juventus	Melbourne Victory
5 September 2025	Tahlia Franco	Sydney FC	Brisbane Roar
5 September 2025	Isabella Accardo	Melbourne City	Unattached
5 September 2025	(Serbia) Tyla-Jay Vlajnic	Melbourne City	Unattached
5 September 2025	Bronte Trew	Western Sydney Wanderers	Perth Glory
6 September 2025	Rhianna Pollicina	Melbourne City	Melbourne Victory
8 September 2025	(United States) Ashlyn Miller	(United States) Texas Longhorns	Brisbane Roar
9 September 2025	Kyla Hanson	(Australia) Eastern Suburbs	Brisbane Roar
9 September 2025	(New Zealand) Kelli Brown	Perth Glory	Newcastle Jets
10 September 2025	(Netherlands) Bente Jansen	(Netherlands) Ajax	Brisbane Roar
12 September 2025	(United States) Josie Aulicino	(Australia) Box Hill United	Canberra United
12 September 2025	(New Zealand) Macey Fraser	(United States) Utah Royals	Wellington Phoenix
16 September 2025	(China) Wang Ying	(China) Guangdong	Western Sydney Wanderers
16 September 2025	(China) Yuan Cong	(China) Guangdong	Western Sydney Wanderers
17 September 2025	(United States) Jazmin Wardlow	(Turkey) Galatasaray	Canberra United
17 September 2025	Lara Gooch	Newcastle Jets	Adelaide United
17 September 2025	(Philippines) Emma Tovar	Unattached	Perth Glory
17 September 2025	Sharn Freier	(Germany) VfL Wolfsburg	Brisbane Roar (loan)
17 September 2025	(New Zealand) Olivia Page	Unattached	Newcastle Jets
18 September 2025	(Nigeria) Chinaza Uchendu	(France) Nantes	Melbourne City
18 September 2025	(Haiti) Laurie-Ann Moïse	Unattached	Sydney FC
18 September 2025	(New Zealand) Zoe McMeeken	Wellington Phoenix	Melbourne Victory
19 September 2025	(New Zealand) Charlotte Lancaster	(Australia) APIA Leichhardt	Newcastle Jets
19 September 2025	Emilia Makris	Melbourne City	Adelaide United
19 September 2025	(England) Ellie Wilson	Melbourne Victory	Melbourne City
23 September 2025	Poppie Hooks	(Australia) Illawarra Stingrays	Western Sydney Wanderers
25 September 2025	Ayana Aoyagi	(Australia) South Melbourne	Melbourne City
25 September 2025	Danella Butrus	(Australia) Bulleen Lions	Melbourne City
25 September 2025	Dali Gorr-Burchmore	(Australia) South Melbourne	Melbourne City
25 September 2025	Kaya Jugovic	(Australia) Football Victoria Academy	Melbourne City
25 September 2025	Keira Sarris	(Australia) Football Victoria Academy	Melbourne City
26 September 2025	Eliza Evans	(Australia) Souths United	Canberra United
26 September 2025	Paige Zois	Melbourne Victory	Adelaide United
26 September 2025	Teresa Morrissey	Central Coast Mariners	Perth Glory
26 September 2025	(United States) Marianna Seidl	(Czech Republic) Slavia Prague	Brisbane Roar
29 September 2025	(United States) Josie Studer	(United States) Carolina Ascent	Brisbane Roar
29 September 2025	Sienna Dale	(Australia) Manly United	Canberra United
30 September 2025	Maja Markovski	Canberra United	Unattached
1 October 2025	(New Zealand) Brianna Edwards	Sydney FC	Western Sydney Wanderers
2 October 2025	(Philippines) Janae DeFazio	Unattached	Western Sydney Wanderers
2 October 2025	Ava Briedis	Melbourne Victory	Canberra United
3 October 2025	Lia Privitelli	Melbourne Victory	Retired
7 October 2025	Meg Phillips	(Australia) Fremantle City	Perth Glory
7 October 2025	Olivia Wood	(Australia) Essendon Royals	Perth Glory
10 October 2025	Amelie Millar	(Australia) Launceston City	Adelaide United
10 October 2025	Carina Rossi	(Australia) Box Hill United	Adelaide United
10 October 2025	Clancy Westaway	(Australia) Football Victoria Academy	Perth Glory
14 October 2025	Alyse Oppedisano	Unattached	Sydney FC
20 October 2025	Miley Grigg	Adelaide United	(Australia) North Eastern MetroStars
23 October 2025	(United States) Cannon Clough	(United States) Carolina Ascent	Central Coast Mariners
24 October 2025	(England) Brooke Nunn	Central Coast Mariners	Wellington Phoenix
28 October 2025	Mia Green	Newcastle Jets	Unattached
28 October 2025	Jaya Bowman	Canberra United	Central Coast Mariners
28 October 2025	Jynaya dos Santos	Canberra United	Central Coast Mariners
28 October 2025	(England) Millie Farrow	Sydney FC	Central Coast Mariners
28 October 2025	Elizabeth Grey	(Australia) Bulls FC Academy	Central Coast Mariners
28 October 2025	Allyssa Ng-Saad	(Australia) Gladesville Ravens	Western Sydney Wanderers
29 October 2025	(Switzerland) Lorena Baumann	Newcastle Jets	Central Coast Mariners
29 October 2025	Isabella Coco-Di Sipio	(Australia) Bulls FC Academy	Central Coast Mariners
29 October 2025	Maya Fernandez	(Australia) Sydney Olympic	Central Coast Mariners
29 October 2025	Tamar Levin	Brisbane Roar	Central Coast Mariners
29 October 2025	Baxter Thew	(Australia) Sydney Olympic	Central Coast Mariners
29 October 2025	Sophia Varley	Melbourne City	Central Coast Mariners
30 October 2025	Sarah Hunter	(France) Paris FC	Sydney FC
30 October 2025	Baylee Broomhead	(Australia) Sydney University	Central Coast Mariners
30 October 2025	Kaiya Buchanan	(Australia) Mount Druitt Town Rangers	Central Coast Mariners
30 October 2025	Annalee Grove	Adelaide United	Central Coast Mariners
30 October 2025	Haley Johnson	(Australia) Northern Tigers	Newcastle Jets
31 October 2025	Keira Bobbin	(Australia) Belconnen United	Canberra United
31 October 2025	Alyssa Rose	(Australia) APIA Leichhardt	Sydney FC
5 November 2025	(South Korea) Kim So-eun	(South Korea) Incheon Hyundai Steel Red Angels	Western Sydney Wanderers

==== Western United hibernation process ====
On 6 September 2025, Western United were put into hibernation for the 2025–26 season and all the players were released by the club to allow them to seek alternative employment.

Listed below are the players who were at the club at time of the hibernation announcement and the clubs they joined if signed in the current transfer window.

Name	New club
Alana Cerne	Western Sydney Wanderers
Alana Cortellino	Unattached
Alyssa Dall'Oste	Perth Glory
Kiara De Domizio	Canberra United
(Colombia) Isabel Dehakiz	Unattached
Sasha Grove	Canberra United
Grace Maher	Melbourne Victory
Aimee Medwin	Brisbane Roar
Claudia Mihocic	Unattached
Natalie Picak	Melbourne Victory
Avaani Prakash	Central Coast Mariners
Emily Roach	(Philippines) Stallion Laguna
Julia Sardo	Perth Glory
Adriana Taranto	Adelaide United
Melissa Taranto	Adelaide United

=== Mid-season ===
Date	Name	Moving from	Moving to
14 November 2025	Daisy McAllister	(Australia) Perth SC	Perth Glory
14 November 2025	Gracen Blieschke	(Australia) FSA NTC	Adelaide United
14 November 2025	Maeve Nicholas	(Australia) West Torrens Birkalla	Adelaide United
14 November 2025	Mia Trimboli	(Australia) FSA NTC	Adelaide United
21 November 2025	(New Zealand) Elizabeth Anton	(Norway) Kolbotn	Canberra United
4 December 2025	(New Zealand) Zoe Benson	(New Zealand) Auckland United	Wellington Phoenix
12 December 2025	Chloe Berryhill	(Italy) Como 1907	Western Sydney Wanderers
15 December 2025	Alyssa Dall'Oste	Perth Glory	Unattached
29 December 2025	(New Zealand) Emma Pijnenburg	(Netherlands) Feyenoord	Wellington Phoenix
7 January 2026	(United States) Makala Woods	Unattached	Wellington Phoenix
19 January 2026	(Haiti) Laurie-Ann Moïse	Sydney FC	(North Macedonia) Ljuboten
19 January 2026	Alyssa Rose	Sydney FC	(Australia) APIA Leichhardt
22 January 2026	(United States) Mackenzie Anthony	(Republic of Ireland) Shelbourne	Wellington Phoenix
24 January 2026	Chloe Berryhill	Western Sydney Wanderers	Retired
3 February 2026	Annalise Rasmussen	Central Coast Mariners	(Italy) Juventus
3 February 2026	Leia Varley	Brisbane Roar	(Germany) 1. FC Nürnberg
6 February 2026	(Philippines) Angela Beard	Unattached	Brisbane Roar
21 February 2026	(New Zealand) Ava Collins	(Australia) UNSW FC	Western Sydney Wanderers
18 March 2026	(New Zealand) Olivia Ingham	Wellington Phoenix	(New Zealand) Auckland United
19 March 2026	(England) Fiona Worts	Adelaide United	(South Korea) Incheon Hyundai Steel Red Angels
20 March 2026	Claudia Valletta	(Australia) Bulls FC Academy	Sydney FC
26 March 2026	Charlotte McLean	Unattached	Sydney FC
27 March 2026	Dayle Schroeder	(Australia) Perth Azzurri	Perth Glory

== Re-signings ==
Date	Name	Club
22 May 2025	Shay Hollman (Note: Player signed a two-year extension.)	Sydney FC
27 May 2025	(Republic of Ireland) Erin Healy	Adelaide United
27 May 2025	Emily Condon	Adelaide United
27 May 2025	Ella Tonkin	Adelaide United
11 June 2025	Julia Sardo	Western United
13 June 2025	Claudia Mihocic	Western United
18 June 2025	(United States) Taylor Otto	Melbourne City
18 June 2025	Kiara De Domizio	Western United
20 June 2025	(Spain) Malena Mieres	Melbourne City
20 June 2025	Adriana Taranto	Western United
25 June 2025	Caley Tallon-Henniker	Sydney FC
25 June 2025	Amber Luchtmeijer	Sydney FC
25 June 2025	Ruby Sullivan	Sydney FC
26 June 2025	Josie Allan	Newcastle Jets
27 June 2025	(New Zealand) Rebekah Stott	Melbourne City
27 June 2025	Amy Chessari	Western Sydney Wanderers
30 June 2025	Holly McNamara	Melbourne City
30 June 2025	Talia Younis	Western Sydney Wanderers
4 July 2025	Leticia McKenna	Melbourne City
4 July 2025	(New Zealand) Emma Main	Wellington Phoenix
4 July 2025	(Japan) Ena Harada	Western Sydney Wanderers
8 July 2025	(Portugal) Siena Arrarte	Western Sydney Wanderers
8 July 2025	Milly Bennett	Western Sydney Wanderers
9 July 2025	(New Zealand) Mackenzie Barry	Wellington Phoenix
14 July 2025	Josie Wilson	Newcastle Jets
16 July 2025	(New Zealand) Grace Jale	Wellington Phoenix
22 July 2025	Leah Davidson	Melbourne City
23 July 2025	(Lebanon) Tiana Jaber	Wellington Phoenix
25 July 2025	Amali Kinsella	Brisbane Roar
25 July 2025	Zara Kruger	Brisbane Roar
25 July 2025	Alicia Woods	Brisbane Roar
6 August 2025	Mackenzie Hawkesby	Sydney FC
7 August 2025	Cassidy Davis	Newcastle Jets
11 August 2025	Isobel Dalton	Perth Glory
11 August 2025	Tijan McKenna	Perth Glory
12 August 2025	Georgia Cassidy	Perth Glory
12 August 2025	Grace Johnston	Perth Glory
13 August 2025	Naomi Chinnama	Perth Glory
13 August 2025	(Nigeria) Onyinyechi Zogg	Perth Glory
14 August 2025	Sarah O'Donoghue	Perth Glory
14 August 2025	Susan Phonsongkham	Perth Glory
14 August 2025	Claire Adams	Newcastle Jets
18 August 2025	Michelle Heyman	Canberra United
19 August 2025	Ella Abdul-Massih	Perth Glory
19 August 2025	Charli Wainwright	Perth Glory
20 August 2025	Tegan Bertolissio	Canberra United
20 August 2025	Bethany Gordon	Canberra United
20 August 2025	Darcey Malone	Canberra United
20 August 2025	Emma Robers	Canberra United
20 August 2025	Alana Jančevski	Melbourne Victory
20 August 2025	Holly Furphy	Melbourne Victory
20 August 2025	Sofia Sakalis	Melbourne Victory
20 August 2025	Tanika Lala	Perth Glory
20 August 2025	Ella Lincoln	Perth Glory
20 August 2025	Tori Tumeth	Sydney FC
25 August 2025	Mischa Anderson	Perth Glory
25 August 2025	Jessica Skinner	Perth Glory
26 August 2025	Sally James	Canberra United
26 August 2025	Coco Majstorovic	Canberra United
26 August 2025	(Serbia) Mary Stanić-Floody	Canberra United
26 August 2025	Hayley Taylor-Young	Canberra United
26 August 2025	Nickoletta Flannery (Note: Flannery spent the off-season at Apollon Limassol.)	Melbourne Victory
26 August 2025	Rachel Lowe	Melbourne Victory
26 August 2025	Courtney Newbon	Melbourne Victory
28 August 2025	Chelsie Dawber	Adelaide United
28 August 2025	Sian Dewey	Adelaide United
28 August 2025	Emily Hodgson (Note: Player signed a three-year extension.)	Adelaide United
28 August 2025	(New Zealand) Claudia Jenkins	Adelaide United
28 August 2025	Matilda McNamara	Adelaide United
28 August 2025	Ilona Melegh	Adelaide United
28 August 2025	Sarah Morgan	Adelaide United
28 August 2025	(England) Fiona Worts	Adelaide United
29 August 2025	Ella O'Grady	Melbourne Victory
29 August 2025	Laura Pickett	Melbourne Victory
1 September 2025	Tameka Yallop	Brisbane Roar
3 September 2025	Kijah Stephenson	Brisbane Roar
5 September 2025	Caitlin Karic	Melbourne City
12 September 2025	Melissa Barbieri	Melbourne City
12 September 2025	Lauren Allan	Newcastle Jets
17 September 2025	(United States) Gabby Hollar	Perth Glory
18 September 2025	Alexis Collins	Newcastle Jets
18 September 2025	(New Zealand) Brooke Neary	Wellington Phoenix
26 September 2025	Janet King	Canberra United
17 October 2025	Alex McKenzie	Canberra United
22 October 2025	Annabel Martin	Central Coast Mariners
23 October 2025	Tiana Fuller	Central Coast Mariners
23 October 2025	Greta Kraszula	Central Coast Mariners
23 October 2025	Sarah Langman	Central Coast Mariners
30 October 2025	Eliza Familton	Central Coast Mariners
30 October 2025	(United States) Blake Hughes	Central Coast Mariners
1 November 2025	Sofia Christopherson	Canberra United
1 November 2025	Lillian Skelly	Canberra United
5 November 2025	Ally Boertje	Newcastle Jets
5 December 2025	Danella Butrus (Note: Player signed an extension for next season.)	Melbourne City
12 March 2026	(England) Brooke Nunn	Wellington Phoenix
12 March 2026	(United States) Makala Woods	Wellington Phoenix
27 March 2026	(United States) Ellie Walker	Wellington Phoenix
27 March 2026	Willa Pearson	Sydney FC
15 April 2026	(New Zealand) Mackenzie Barry	Wellington Phoenix
17 April 2026	Claire Corbett	Sydney FC
29 April 2026	(New Zealand) Grace Jale	Wellington Phoenix
