= 2024–25 Perth Glory FC (women) season =

17th season in existence of Perth Glory FC (women)

Perth Glory FC (women)
2024–25 season
- Head Coach: Stephen Peters
- Stadium: Sam Kerr Football Centre; HBF Park
- A-League Women: 10th
- Top goalscorer: Kelli Brown (5)
- Highest home attendance: 1,873 vs. Newcastle Jets (10 November 2024); A-League Women
- Lowest home attendance: 968 vs. Adelaide United (15 December 2024); A-League Women
- Average home league attendance: 1,271
- Biggest win: 3–1 vs. Adelaide United (H) (15 December 2024); A-League Women
- Biggest defeat: 2–5 vs. Melbourne City (A) (3 November 2024); A-League Women
Home colours	Away colours

The 2024–25 season was the Perth Glory Football Club (women)'s 17th season in the A-League Women.

== Players ==
=== First-team squad ===
As of 28 February 2025

Note: Flags indicate national team as defined under FIFA eligibility rules; some limited exceptions apply. Players may hold more than one non-FIFA nationality.

No.	Pos.	Nation	Player
1	GK	AUS	Casey Dumont
2	DF	AUS	Mischa Anderson
3	MF	AUS	Hollie Palmer (injury replacement)
4	DF	AUS	Claudia Valletta (injury replacement)
5	MF	AUS	Grace Johnston
6	DF	AUS	Tijan McKenna
7	MF	WAL	Megan Wynne
8	MF	AUS	Georgia Cassidy
9	FW	USA	Gabby Hollar
10	MF	AUS	Susan Phonsongkham
11	DF	AUS	Natalie Tathem
13	DF	AUS	Naomi Chinnama
14	MF	JPN	Miku Sunaga
16	DF	AUS	Isabella Wallhead

No.	Pos.	Nation	Player
17	FW	AUS	Morgan Roberts (injury replacement)
18	DF	AUS	Isabella Foletta
19	MF	AUS	Sarah O'Donoghue
20	MF	AUS	Ella Abdul-Massih
21	GK	AUS	Miranda Templeman
22	MF	AUS	Ischia Brooking
23	MF	AUS	Isobel Dalton (co-captain)
25	FW	AUS	Ella Lincoln (youth)
26	FW	AUS	Tanika Lala
27	MF	AUS	Charli Wainwright (youth)
29	DF	NGR	Onyinyechi Zogg (co-captain)
30	GK	AUS	Jessica Skinner
44	FW	NZL	Kelli Brown

== Transfers ==
=== Transfers in ===
No.	Position	Player	From	Type/fee	Contract length	Date	Ref
9	FW	(United States) Gabby Hollar	(Australia) Boroondara-Carey Eagles	Free transfer	1 year	6 August 2024	
13	DF	Naomi Chinnama	Unattached	Free transfer	1 year	9 August 2024	
20	MF	Ella Abdul-Massih	Unattached	Free transfer	1 year	9 August 2024	
19	MF	Sarah O'Donoghue	Brisbane Roar	Free transfer	1 year	9 August 2024	
22	MF	Ischia Brooking	Unattached	Free transfer	1 year	13 August 2024	
6	DF	Tijan McKenna	Unattached	Free transfer	1 year	13 August 2024	
29	DF	(Nigeria) Onyinyechi Zogg	Unattached	Free transfer	1 year	14 August 2024	
44	FW	(New Zealand) Kelli Brown	(Australia) Macarthur Rams	Free transfer	1 year	14 August 2024	
7	MF	(Wales) Megan Wynne	Unattached	Free transfer	2 years	15 August 2024	
30	GK	Jessica Skinner	(Australia) Football West NTC	Free transfer	1 year	11 September 2024	
21	GK	Miranda Templeman	Unattached	Free transfer	1 year	11 September 2024	
11	DF	Natalie Tathem	Unattached	Free transfer	2 years	18 September 2024	
1	GK	Casey Dumont	Unattached	Free transfer	1 year	8 October 2024	
14	MF	(Japan) Miku Sunaga	(Australia) Macarthur Rams	Free transfer	1 year	9 October 2024	
25	FW	Ella Lincoln	(Australia) Perth SC	Youth development agreement	1 year	11 October 2024	
27	MF	Charli Wainwright	(Australia) Perth SC	Youth development agreement	1 year	11 October 2024	
17	FW	Morgan Roberts	(Australia) NWS Spirit	Injury replacement		1 November 2024	
4	DF	Claudia Valletta	Unattached	Injury replacement		13 December 2024	
12	FW	Caitlin Doeglas	Unattached	Injury replacement		10 January 2025	
3	MF	Hollie Palmer	Unattached	Injury replacement		28 February 2025	

=== Transfers out ===
No.	Position	Player	Transferred to	Type/fee	Date	Ref
29	GK	Lilly Bailey	(United States) Morehead State Eagles	End of contract	11 March 2024	
4	DF	Natasha Rigby	Retired		3 May 2024	
9	FW	(England) Millie Farrow	Sydney FC	End of contract	17 June 2024	
28	FW	Anika Stajcic	(Australia) Football NSW Institute	End of contract	1 July 2024	
13	MF	Sarah Cain	Unattached	End of contract	1 July 2024	
14	FW	Tia Stonehill	Unattached	End of contract	1 July 2024	
17	FW	Abbey Green	Unattached	End of contract	1 July 2024	
18	MF	Sadie Lawrence	Unattached	End of contract	1 July 2024	
31	MF	Clara Hoarau	Unattached	End of contract	1 July 2024	
11	MF	(New Zealand) Grace Jale	Unattached	End of contract	4 July 2024	
1	GK	Morgan Aquino	(United States) DC Power	End of contract	9 July 2024	
20	FW	(Philippines) Quinley Quezada	(Philippines) Manila Digger	End of contract	2 August 2024	
8	MF	Hana Lowry	Sydney FC	End of contract	8 August 2024	
12	MF	Sofia Sakalis	Melbourne Victory	End of contract	17 August 2024	
24	GK	Sally James	Canberra United	End of contract	23 August 2024	
7	DF	(New Zealand) Elizabeth Anton	Canberra United	End of contract	9 September 2024	
22	DF	Claudia Mihocic	Western United	End of contract	17 September 2024	
3	MF	(Philippines) Jessika Cowart	(Canada) Vancouver Rise	Mutual contract termination	9 October 2024	
12	FW	Caitlin Doeglas	Unattached	End of contract	15 February 2025	

=== Contract extensions ===
No.	Player	Position	Duration	Date	Ref.
3	(Philippines) Jessika Cowart	Defender	1 year	7 August 2024	
10	Susan Phonsongkham	Midfielder	1 year	7 August 2024	
16	Isabella Wallhead	Defender	1 year	12 August 2024	
18	Isabella Foletta	Defender	1 year	12 August 2024	
5	Grace Johnston	Midfielder	1 year	12 August 2024	
2	Mischa Anderson	Defender	1 year	12 August 2024	
8	Georgia Cassidy	Midfielder	1 year	13 August 2024	
26	Tanika Lala	Forward	1 year	14 August 2024	

== Pre-season and friendlies ==
13 October 2024 Gold Fields Challenge Cup	WA State Team (Western Australia)	2–5	Perth Glory	Perth
13:00 AWST	Sakairi 81'; Thew 88' (o.g.)	Report	Brown 2'; Cassidy 29'; Hollar 53', 54'; Sunaga 90+3'	Stadium: Dorrien Gardens; Referee: Niall Gilmour

== Competitions ==
=== Overall record ===
Competition	First match	Last match	Final position	Record							
Competition	First match	Last match	Final position	Pld	W	D	L	GF	GA	GD	Win %
A-League Women	3 November 2024	18 April 2025	10th	23	6	4	13	27	43	−16	26.09
Total				23	6	4	13	27	43	−16	26.09

Last updated: 18 April 2025
Source: Competitions

=== A-League Women ===
==== League table ====
Pos	Team	Pld	W	D	L	GF	GA	GD	Pts
8	Sydney FC	23	7	4	12	23	29	−6	25
9	Wellington Phoenix (Note: Wellington Phoenix cannot qualify for the AFC Women's Champions League as they are based in New Zealand, which is part of the Oceania Football Confederation.)	23	7	3	13	25	30	−5	24
10	Perth Glory	23	6	4	13	27	43	−16	22
11	Newcastle Jets	23	5	5	13	29	53	−24	20
12	Western Sydney Wanderers	23	4	4	15	28	46	−18	16

Source: A-Leagues
Rules for classification: 1) points; 2) goal difference; 3) goals scored; 4) wins; 5) head-to-head results; 5a) head-to-head points; 5b) head-to-head goal difference; 6) Fair Play points; 7) away goal difference; 8) away goals per match; 9) home goal difference; 10) home goals per match; 11) toss of a coin in an event of a tie of two clubs.

==== Matches ====
Win Draw Loss

All times are in local time (AWST).

3 November 2024 1	Melbourne City	5–2	Perth Glory	Melbourne
12:00	Pollicina 53', 69'; Harvey 63', 73'; Hughes 90+5'	Report	Brown 7'; Sunaga 51'	Stadium: ctrl:cyber Pitch; Attendance: 582; Referee: Rebecca Durcau

10 November 2024 2	Perth Glory	3–2	Newcastle Jets	Perth
15:00	Cassidy 1'; O'Donoghue 50'; Brown 65'	Report	J. Allan 13'; Gallagher 90+3'	Stadium: HBF Park; Attendance: 1,873; Referee: Isabella Mossin

15 November 2024 3	Brisbane Roar	3–0	Perth Glory	Brisbane
16:00	Yallop 7', 59' (pen.); Levin 13'	Report		Stadium: Perry Park; Attendance: 1,588; Referee: Georgia Ghirardello

24 November 2024 4	Canberra United	1–1	Perth Glory	Sydney
10:30	Stanic-Floody 69'	Report	Dalton 41'	Stadium: Netstrata Jubilee Stadium (Note: Match moved from Leichhardt Oval following a pitch assessment.); Attendance: 1,237; Referee: Beth Rattray

8 December 2024 5	Perth Glory	0–1	Melbourne Victory	Perth
17:00		Report	Murphy 90+2'	Stadium: Sam Kerr Football Centre; Attendance: 971; Referee: Bec Mackie

15 December 2024 6	Perth Glory	3–1	Adelaide United	Perth
17:00	Chinnama 24'; Hollar 75' (pen.), 90+1'	Report	Dawber 70'	Stadium: Sam Kerr Football Centre; Attendance: 968; Referee: Mikayla Ryan

20 December 2024 7	Western Sydney Wanderers	1–1	Perth Glory	Sydney
16:00	Harrison 85'	Report	Brown 90+6' (pen.)	Stadium: Wanderers Football Park; Attendance: 862; Referee: Rachael Mitchenson

27 December 2024 8	Perth Glory	0–1	Central Coast Mariners	Perth
17:00		Report	Pennock 85'	Stadium: Sam Kerr Football Centre; Attendance: 2,464; Referee: Rebecca Durcau

4 January 2025 10	Wellington Phoenix	2–0	Perth Glory	Wellington
11:00	Jale 47'; Fergusson 69'	Report		Stadium: Porirua Park; Attendance: 675; Referee: Mikayla Ryan

10 January 2025 11	Perth Glory	1–1	Sydney FC	Perth
19:00	Doeglas 24'	Report	Johnson 45+1'	Stadium: Sam Kerr Football Centre; Attendance: 1,139; Referee: Rachael Mitchenson

18 January 2025 12	Melbourne Victory	1–0	Perth Glory	Melbourne
15:00	Morrison 33'	Report		Stadium: The Home of the Matildas; Attendance: 1,014; Referee: Rachael Mitchenson

21 January 2025 9	Western United	4–1	Perth Glory	Melbourne
16:00	Valletta 34' (o.g.); Maher 36'; M. Taranto 71'; Medwin 87'	Report	Hollar 81'	Stadium: Ironbark Fields; Attendance: 503; Referee: Molly Godsell

26 January 2025 13	Perth Glory	3–2	Brisbane Roar	Perth
17:00	Doeglas 29', 34'; Abdul-Massih 90+3'	Report	Yallop 5'; Kuilamu 31'	Stadium: Sam Kerr Football Centre; Attendance: 1,044; Referee: Isabella Mossin

1 February 2025 14	Canberra United	1–0	Perth Glory	Canberra
14:00	Anton 56'	Report		Stadium: McKellar Park; Attendance: 1,807; Referee: Georgia Ghirardello

7 February 2025 15	Adelaide United	3–0	Perth Glory	Adelaide
13:50	Healy 16', 90+3'; Dawber 31'	Report		Stadium: Coopers Stadium; Attendance: 1,859; Referee: Bec Mackie

16 February 2025 16	Perth Glory	2–1	Wellington Phoenix	Perth
17:00	Dalton 31'; Jaber 71' (o.g.)	Report	Fergusson 45+1'	Stadium: Sam Kerr Football Centre; Attendance: 880; Referee: Molly Godsell

1 March 2025 17	Newcastle Jets	2–1	Perth Glory	Newcastle
14:00	Hoban 2', 3'	Report	Lincoln 56'	Stadium: No.2 Sportsground; Attendance: 1,048; Referee: Rebecca Durcau

7 March 2025 18	Perth Glory	3–0	Western United	Perth
19:00	Brown 14', 81'; Phonsongkham 86' (pen.)	Report		Stadium: Sam Kerr Football Centre; Attendance: 873; Referee: Georgia Ghirardello

14 March 2025 19	Central Coast Mariners	3–3	Perth Glory	Gosford
16:00	Nash 19'; Rasmussen 62'; Fuller 70'	Report	O'Donoghue 49', 56'; McKenna 90+3'	Stadium: Industree Group Stadium; Attendance: 1,115; Referee: Molly Godsell

22 March 2025 20	Perth Glory	1–0	Western Sydney Wanderers	Perth
17:00	Foletta 90+1'	Report		Stadium: Sam Kerr Football Centre; Attendance: 996; Referee: Bec Mackie

29 March 2025 21	Perth Glory	1–2	Canberra United	Perth
17:00	McKenna 60'	Report	Heyman 16'; Stanic-Floody 21' (pen.)	Stadium: Sam Kerr Football Centre; Attendance: 896; Referee: Molly Godsell

12 April 2025 22	Sydney FC	1–0	Perth Glory	Sydney
11:15	Ibini 90+1'	Report		Stadium: Allianz Stadium; Attendance: 2,481; Referee: Sarah Jones

18 April 2025 23	Perth Glory	1–5	Melbourne City	Perth
19:00	Phonsongkham 12' (pen.)	Report	Otto 3', 26'; Henry 6'; McNamara 40'; L. McKenna 68'	Stadium: Sam Kerr Football Centre; Attendance: 1,402; Referee: Bec Mackie

== Statistics ==
=== Appearances and goals ===
Includes all competitions. Players with no appearances not included in the list.

As of match played 18 April 2025

No.	Pos	Nat	Player	Total		A-League Women	
No.	Pos	Nat	Player	Apps	Goals	Apps	Goals
1	GK	(Australia) AUS	Casey Dumont	17	0	17	0
2	DF	(Australia) AUS	Mischa Anderson	10	0	0+10	0
3	MF	(Australia) AUS	Hollie Palmer	3	0	3	0
4	DF	(Australia) AUS	Claudia Valletta	4	0	2+2	0
5	MF	(Australia) AUS	Grace Johnston	22	0	22	0
6	DF	(Australia) AUS	Tijan McKenna	20	2	19+1	2
7	MF	(Wales) WAL	Megan Wynne	20	0	19+1	0
8	MF	(Australia) AUS	Georgia Cassidy	16	1	16	1
9	FW	(United States) USA	Gabby Hollar	13	3	12+1	3
10	MF	(Australia) AUS	Susan Phonsongkham	6	2	2+4	2
11	DF	(Australia) AUS	Natalie Tathem	21	0	20+1	0
13	DF	(Australia) AUS	Naomi Chinnama	23	1	23	1
14	MF	(Japan) JPN	Miku Sunaga	15	1	7+8	1
17	FW	(Australia) AUS	Morgan Roberts	7	0	0+7	0
18	DF	(Australia) AUS	Isabella Foletta	14	1	4+10	1
19	MF	(Australia) AUS	Sarah O'Donoghue	15	3	11+4	3
20	MF	(Australia) AUS	Ella Abdul-Massih	13	1	3+10	1
21	GK	(Australia) AUS	Miranda Templeman	6	0	6	0
22	MF	(Australia) AUS	Ischia Brooking	2	0	0+2	0
23	MF	(Australia) AUS	Isobel Dalton	19	2	18+1	2
25	FW	(Australia) AUS	Ella Lincoln	10	1	0+10	1
26	FW	(Australia) AUS	Tanika Lala	5	0	2+3	0
27	MF	(Australia) AUS	Charli Wainwright	18	0	9+9	0
29	DF	(Nigeria) NGR	Onyinyechi Zogg	22	0	20+2	0
44	FW	(New Zealand) NZL	Kelli Brown	13	5	11+2	5
Player(s) transferred out but featured this season
12	FW	(Australia) AUS	Caitlin Doeglas	7	3	7	3

=== Clean sheets ===
Includes all competitions. The list is sorted by squad number when total clean sheets are equal. Numbers in parentheses represent games where both goalkeepers participated and both kept a clean sheet; the number in parentheses is awarded to the goalkeeper who was substituted on, whilst a full clean sheet is awarded to the goalkeeper who was on the field at the start of play. Goalkeepers with no clean sheets not included in the list.

As of match played 18 April 2025

Rank	No.	Nat.	Goalkeeper	A-League Women	Total
1	1	(Australia)	Casey Dumont	2	2

== See also ==
- 2024–25 Perth Glory FC season
