= 2025–26 Perth Glory FC (women) season =

18th season in existence of Perth Glory FC (women)

Perth Glory FC (women)
2025–26 season
- Head Coach: Stephen Peters
- Stadium: Sam Kerr Football Centre; HBF Park
- A-League Women: 8th
- A-League Women Finals: DNQ
- Top goalscorer: Rola Badawiya (5 goals)
Home colours	Away colours

The 2025–26 season was the Perth Glory Football Club (women)'s 18th season in the A-League Women.

== Players ==
=== First-team squad ===
As of 15 December 2025

Note: Flags indicate national team as defined under FIFA eligibility rules; some limited exceptions apply. Players may hold more than one non-FIFA nationality.

No.	Pos.	Nation	Player
1	GK	AUS	Teresa Morrissey
2	DF	AUS	Mischa Anderson
3	MF	PHI	Emma Tovar
4	MF	AUS	Daisy McAllister (youth)
5	MF	AUS	Grace Johnston
6	DF	AUS	Tijan McKenna
7	MF	WAL	Megan Wynne
8	MF	AUS	Georgia Cassidy
9	FW	USA	Gabby Hollar
10	MF	AUS	Susan Phonsongkham
11	DF	AUS	Natalie Tathem
12	FW	AUS	Bronte Trew
13	DF	AUS	Naomi Chinnama
16	MF	AUS	Olivia Wood (youth)

No.	Pos.	Nation	Player
17	FW	USA	Rola Badawiya
19	MF	AUS	Sarah O'Donoghue
20	MF	AUS	Ella Abdul-Massih
21	GK	AUS	Meg Phillips (youth)
22	MF	AUS	Ischia Brooking
23	MF	AUS	Isobel Dalton (captain)
24	DF	AUS	Julia Sardo
25	FW	AUS	Ella Lincoln
26	FW	AUS	Tanika Lala
27	MF	AUS	Charli Wainwright
28	MF	AUS	Clancy Westaway
29	DF	NGR	Onyinyechi Zogg
30	GK	AUS	Jessica Skinner
52	GK	AUS	Dayle Schroeder (injury replacement)

== Transfers ==
=== Transfers in ===
No.	Position	Player	From	Type/fee	Contract length	Date	Ref
17	FW	(United States) Rola Badawiya	Unattached	Free transfer	2 years	29 August 2025	
12	FW	Bronte Trew	Unattached	Free transfer	1 year	5 September 2025	
3	MF	(Philippines) Emma Tovar	Unattached	Free transfer	1 year	17 September 2025	
1	GK	Teresa Morrissey	Central Coast Mariners	Free transfer	1 year	26 September 2025	
24	DF	Julia Sardo	Unattached	Free transfer	1 year	30 September 2025	
16	MF	Olivia Wood	(Australia) Essendon Royals	Youth development agreement	1 year	7 October 2025	
21	GK	Meg Phillips	(Australia) Fremantle City	Youth development agreement	1 year	7 October 2025	
28	MF	Clancy Westaway	(Australia) Football Victoria Academy	Free transfer	1 year	10 October 2025	
33	GK	Alyssa Dall'Oste	Unattached	Injury replacement	6 weeks	30 October 2025	
4	MF	Daisy McAllister	(Australia) Perth SC	Youth development agreement	1 year	14 November 2025	
52	GK	Dayle Schroeder	(Australia) Perth Azzurri	Injury replacement		March 2026	

=== Transfers out ===
No.	Position	Player	Transferred to	Type/fee	Date	Ref
1	GK	Casey Dumont	Unattached	End of contract	30 May 2025	
4	DF	Claudia Valletta	(Australia) Bulls FC Academy	End of contract	5 June 2025	
14	MF	(Japan) Miku Sunaga	(Australia) Gladesville Ravens	End of contract	5 June 2025	
17	FW	Morgan Roberts	(Australia) Gladesville Ravens	End of contract	5 June 2025	
16	DF	Isabella Wallhead	(Australia) Heidelberg United	End of contract	9 June 2025	
21	GK	Miranda Templeman	(Australia) Alamein FC	End of contract	9 June 2025	
3	MF	Hollie Palmer	(Australia) Gold Coast Knights	End of contract	21 June 2025	
18	DF	Isabella Foletta	Unattached	End of contract	30 June 2025	
44	FW	(New Zealand) Kelli Brown	Newcastle Jets	End of contract	9 September 2025	
33	GK	Alyssa Dall'Oste	Unattached	End of contract	15 December 2025	

=== Contract extensions ===
No.	Player	Position	Duration	Date	Ref.
6	Tijan McKenna	Defender	1 year	11 August 2025	
23	Isobel Dalton	Midfielder	1 year	11 August 2025	
5	Grace Johnston	Midfielder	1 year	12 August 2025	
8	Georgia Cassidy	Midfielder	2 years	12 August 2025	
13	Naomi Chinnama	Defender	1 year	13 August 2025	
29	(Nigeria) Onyinyechi Zogg	Defender	1 year	13 August 2025	
10	Susan Phonsongkham	Midfielder	1 year	14 August 2025	
19	Sarah O'Donoghue	Midfielder	1 year	14 August 2025	
20	Ella Abdul-Massih	Midfielder	1 year	19 August 2025	
27	Charli Wainwright	Midfielder	1 year	19 August 2025	
25	Ella Lincoln	Forward	1 year	20 August 2025	
26	Tanika Lala	Forward	1 year	20 August 2025	
2	Mischa Anderson	Defender	1 year	25 August 2025	
30	Jessica Skinner	Goalkeeper	1 year	25 August 2025	
9	(United States) Gabby Hollar	Forward	1 year	17 September 2025	

== Pre-season and friendlies ==
19 October 2025 Challenge Cup	WA State Team (Western Australia)	2–0	Perth Glory	Perth
15:00 AWST	Doeglas 43' (pen.); Leota 90+2'	Report		Stadium: Dorrien Gardens; Referee: Jess Bird

== Competitions ==
=== Overall record ===
Competition	First match	Last match	Final position	Record							
Competition	First match	Last match	Final position	Pld	W	D	L	GF	GA	GD	Win %
A-League Women	31 October 2025	3 April 2026	8th	20	7	3	10	20	30	−10	35.00
Total				20	7	3	10	20	30	−10	35.00

Last updated: 3 April 2026
Source: Competitions

=== A-League Women ===
==== League table ====
Pos	Team	Pld	W	D	L	GF	GA	GD	Pts	Qualification
6	Melbourne Victory	20	8	4	8	27	24	+3	28	Qualification for Finals series
7	Central Coast Mariners	20	7	7	6	27	26	+1	28	
8	Perth Glory	20	7	3	10	20	30	−10	24	
9	Newcastle Jets	20	7	2	11	30	36	−6	23	
10	Sydney FC	20	4	7	9	18	29	−11	19	

Source: A-Leagues
Rules for classification: 1) points; 2) goal difference; 3) goals scored; 4) wins; 5) head-to-head results; 5a) head-to-head points; 5b) head-to-head goal difference; 6) Fair Play points; 7) away goal difference; 8) away goals per match; 9) home goal difference; 10) home goals per match; 11) toss of a coin in an event of a tie of two clubs.

==== Results summary ====
Overall								Home						Away					
Pld	W	D	L	GF	GA	GD	Pts	W	D	L	GF	GA	GD	W	D	L	GF	GA	GD
20	7	3	10	20	30	−10	24	5	2	3	9	7	+2	2	1	7	11	23	−12

Last updated: 3 April 2026.

==== Results by round ====
Round	1	2	3	4	5	6	7	8	9	11	12	13	14	10	15	16	17	18	19	20	21	22
Ground	A	H	A	A	A	B	H	H	A	H	H	A	H	H	B	A	H	A	A	H	A	H
Result	W	L	L	L	L	✖	W	W	L	W	W	D	L	D	✖	L	W	W	L	D	L	L
Position	2	4	7	7	10	11	8	6	8	6	5	6	9	8	8	8	8	5	6	7	8	8
Points	3	3	3	3	3	3	6	9	9	12	15	16	16	17	17	17	20	23	23	24	24	24

Updated to match(es) played on 5 April 2026. Source: A-Leagues
A = Away; H = Home; N = Neutral; W = Win; D = Draw; L = Loss

==== Matches ====
Win Draw Loss

31 October 2025 1	Western Sydney Wanderers	1–3	Perth Glory	Sydney
20:15 AEDT	Buchanan 51'	Report	Hollar 28', 52'; Badawiya 47'	Stadium: Wanderers Football Park; Attendance: 957; Referee: Isabella Mossin
Note: Due to lightning delays, the kickoff was delayed to 20:15.

7 November 2025 2	Perth Glory	2–3	Brisbane Roar	Perth
16:00 AWST	Badawiya 25'; Lincoln 90+2'	Report	Kuilamu 21'; Jansen 52', 55'	Stadium: HBF Park; Attendance: 1,040; Referee: Bec Mackie

15 November 2025 3	Sydney FC	2–0	Perth Glory	Sydney
14:45 AEDT	Galic 53'; Tanner 70'	Report		Stadium: Leichhardt Oval; Attendance: 2,122; Referee: Georgia Ghirardello

22 November 2025 4	Canberra United	3–0	Perth Glory	Canberra
16:00 AEDT	Heyman 3'; Robers 8'; Gordon 57'	Report		Stadium: McKellar Park; Attendance: 845; Referee: Rachael Mitchenson

30 November 2025 5	Melbourne Victory	3–0	Perth Glory	Melbourne
16:00 AEDT	White 21'; Sakalis 36'; Pollicina 42'	Report		Stadium: The Home of the Matildas; Referee: Mikayla Ryan

12 December 2025 7	Perth Glory	1–0	Wellington Phoenix	Perth
19:00 AWST	Phonsongkham 75'	Report		Stadium: Sam Kerr Football Centre; Attendance: 1,069; Referee: Mikayla Ryan

21 December 2025 8	Perth Glory	1–0	Adelaide United	Perth
17:00 AWST	Badawiya 39'	Report		Stadium: Sam Kerr Football Centre; Attendance: 825; Referee: Sophie Allum

28 December 2025 9	Melbourne City	3–1	Perth Glory	Melbourne
16:15 AEDT	McNamara 23', 45+3', 71'	Report	Trew 50'	Stadium: AAMI Park; Attendance: 1,937; Referee: Bec Mackie

3 January 2026 11	Perth Glory	1–0	Newcastle Jets	Perth
18:00 AWST	Dalton 8'	Report		Stadium: Sam Kerr Football Centre; Attendance: 948; Referee: Rebecca Durcau

9 January 2026 12	Perth Glory	3–1	Western Sydney Wanderers	Perth
19:00 AWST	Tovar 29'; Phonsongkham 44'; Lincoln 84'	Report	Yuan 75'	Stadium: Sam Kerr Football Centre; Attendance: 879; Referee: Rachael Mitchenson

18 January 2026 13	Central Coast Mariners	1–1	Perth Glory	Gosford
17:00 AEDT	Trimis 61'	Report	Phonsongkham 34'	Stadium: polytec Stadium; Attendance: 1,000; Referee: Anna-Marie Keighley

24 January 2026 14	Perth Glory	0–2	Melbourne City	Perth
17:00 AWST	McNamara 20', 72'	Report		Stadium: Sam Kerr Football Centre; Attendance: 856; Referee: Georgia Ghirardello

28 January 2026 10	Perth Glory	0–0	Sydney FC	Perth
19:00 AWST		Report		Stadium: Sam Kerr Football Centre; Attendance: 967; Referee: Page Malau-Aduli

6 February 2026 16	Wellington Phoenix	1–0	Perth Glory	Wellington
16:00 NZDT	Woods 45+4'	Report		Stadium: Sky Stadium; Referee: Anna-Marie Keighley

14 February 2026 17	Perth Glory	1–0	Canberra United	Perth
17:00 AWST	Taylor-Young 80' (o.g.)	Report		Stadium: Sam Kerr Football Centre; Attendance: 849; Referee: Isabella Mossin

21 February 2026 18	Newcastle Jets	2–3	Perth Glory	Newcastle
17:00 AEDT	Dundas 16'; Ayres 61'	Report	Hollar 45'; Westaway 68'; McKenna 85'	Stadium: Newcastle Number 2 Sports Ground; Attendance: 1,152; Referee: Isabella Mossin

13 March 2026 19	Adelaide United	2–1	Perth Glory	Adelaide
18:30 ACDT	Worts 31'; Morgan 56'	Report	Badawiya 11'	Stadium: Coopers Stadium; Attendance: 1,527; Referee: Mikayla Ryan

21 March 2026 20	Perth Glory	0–0	Central Coast Mariners	Perth
14:00 AWST		Report		Stadium: Sam Kerr Football Centre; Attendance: 793; Referee: Sophie Allum

27 March 2026 21	Brisbane Roar	5–2	Perth Glory	Brisbane
18:00 AEST	Medwin 20'; Hayashi 32', 65'; Stephenson 57'; Yallop 90+7'	Report	Sardo 45+2'; Badawiya 49'	Stadium: Spencer Park; Attendance: 2,044; Referee: Rachael Mitchenson

3 April 2026 22	Perth Glory	0–1	Melbourne Victory	Perth
16:00 AWST		Report	Bunge 22'	Stadium: Sam Kerr Football Centre; Attendance: 952; Referee: Caitlin Williams

== Statistics ==
=== Appearances and goals ===
Players with no appearances are not included in the list.

As of match played 3 April 2026

No.	Pos	Nat	Player	Total		A-League Women	
No.	Pos	Nat	Player	Apps	Goals	Apps	Goals
1	GK	(Australia) AUS	Teresa Morrissey	14	0	14	0
2	DF	(Australia) AUS	Mischa Anderson	17	0	5+12	0
3	MF	(Philippines) PHI	Emma Tovar	19	1	17+2	1
4	MF	(Australia) AUS	Daisy McAllister	1	0	0+1	0
5	MF	(Australia) AUS	Grace Johnston	20	0	20	0
6	MF	(Australia) AUS	Tijan McKenna	19	1	19	1
7	MF	(Wales) WAL	Megan Wynne	3	0	1+2	0
8	MF	(Australia) AUS	Georgia Cassidy	15	0	8+7	0
9	FW	(United States) USA	Gabby Hollar	16	3	11+5	3
10	FW	(Australia) AUS	Susan Phonsongkham	15	3	12+3	3
11	DF	(Australia) AUS	Natalie Tathem	5	0	3+2	0
12	FW	(Australia) AUS	Bronte Trew	17	1	8+9	1
13	DF	(Australia) AUS	Naomi Chinnama	5	0	4+1	0
16	FW	(Australia) AUS	Olivia Wood	3	0	1+2	0
17	FW	(United States) USA	Rola Badawiya	18	5	16+2	5
19	MF	(Australia) AUS	Sarah O'Donoghue	16	0	7+9	0
20	MF	(Australia) AUS	Ella Abdul-Massih	3	0	1+2	0
22	MF	(Australia) AUS	Ischia Brooking	2	0	0+2	0
23	MF	(Australia) AUS	Isobel Dalton	17	1	17	1
24	DF	(Australia) AUS	Julia Sardo	17	1	16+1	1
25	FW	(Australia) AUS	Ella Lincoln	20	2	5+15	2
26	FW	(Australia) AUS	Tanika Lala	3	0	0+3	0
27	MF	(Australia) AUS	Charli Wainwright	17	0	4+13	0
28	MF	(Australia) AUS	Clancy Westaway	12	1	4+8	1
29	DF	(Nigeria) NGR	Onyinyechi Zogg	18	0	17+1	0
52	GK	(Australia) AUS	Dayle Schroeder	1	0	1	0
Player(s) transferred out but featured this season
33	GK	(Australia) AUS	Alyssa Dall'Oste	5	0	5	0

- Source: Soccerway

=== Clean sheets ===
Includes all competitions. The list is sorted by squad number when total clean sheets are equal. Numbers in parentheses represent games where both goalkeepers participated and both kept a clean sheet; the number in parentheses is awarded to the goalkeeper who was substituted on, whilst a full clean sheet is awarded to the goalkeeper who was on the field at the start of play. Goalkeepers with no clean sheets not included in the list.

As of match played 3 April 2026

Rank	No.	Nat.	Goalkeeper	A-League Women	Total
1	1	(Australia)	Teresa Morrissey	6	6

== See also ==
- 2025–26 Perth Glory FC season
