= 2023–24 Perth Glory FC (women) season =

16th season in existence of Perth Glory FC (women)

Perth Glory (A-League Women)
2023–24 season
- Manager: Alexander Epakis
- Stadium: Macedonia Park; HBF Park
- A-League Women: 10th
- A-League Women Finals: DNQ
- Top goalscorer: Millie Farrow (7)
- Highest home attendance: 1,568 vs. Sydney FC (17 December 2023); A-League Women
- Lowest home attendance: 901 vs. Central Coast Mariners (18 February 2024); A-League Women
- Average home league attendance: 1,250
- Biggest win: 2–0 vs. Western United (H) (14 October 2023); A-League Women; 3–1 vs. Melbourne City (A) (9 December 2023); A-League Women
- Biggest defeat: 1–3 (3 times); 0–2 (once)
Home colours	Away colours

The 2023–24 season was the 16th in the history of Perth Glory Football Club (A-League Women).

== Players ==
=== First-team squad ===
As of 11 October 2023

Note: Flags indicate national team as defined under FIFA eligibility rules; some limited exceptions apply. Players may hold more than one non-FIFA nationality.

No.	Pos.	Nation	Player
1	GK	AUS	Morgan Aquino
3	MF	PHI	Jessika Cowart
4	DF	AUS	Natasha Rigby (captain)
7	DF	NZL	Elizabeth Anton
8	FW	AUS	Hana Lowry
9	FW	ENG	Millie Farrow
10	MF	AUS	Susan Phonsongkham
11	MF	NZL	Grace Jale
12	MF	AUS	Sofia Sakalis
13	MF	AUS	Sarah Cain
14	FW	AUS	Tia Stonehill
16	DF	AUS	Isabella Wallhead
17	FW	AUS	Abbey Green

No.	Pos.	Nation	Player
18	MF	AUS	Sadie Lawrence
19	DF	AUS	Isabella Foletta
20	FW	PHI	Quinley Quezada
22	DF	AUS	Claudia Mihocic
23	MF	AUS	Isobel Dalton
24	GK	AUS	Sally James
25	MF	AUS	Grace Johnston
26	FW	AUS	Tanika Lala
27	MF	AUS	Georgia Cassidy
28	FW	AUS	Anika Stajcic
29	GK	AUS	Lilly Bailey
30	DF	AUS	Mischa Anderson
31	MF	AUS	Clara Hoarau

== Transfers ==
=== Transfers in ===
No.	Position	Player	Transferred from	Type/fee	Contract length	Date	Ref.
23	MF	Isobel Dalton	Unattached	Free transfer	2 years	20 June 2023	
25	MF	Grace Johnston	Unattached	Free transfer	1 year	21 June 2023	
27	MF	Georgia Cassidy	Unattached	Free transfer	1 year	21 June 2023	
26	FW	Tanika Lala	Unattached	Free transfer	1 year	20 July 2023	
24	GK	Sally James	Melbourne City	Free transfer	1 year	7 August 2023	
11	MF	(New Zealand) Grace Jale	Canberra United	Free transfer	1 year	15 August 2023	
9	FW	(England) Millie Farrow	(United States) North Carolina Courage	Free transfer	1 year	17 August 2023	
14	FW	Tia Stonehill	(Australia) Balcatta Etna	Free transfer	1 year	30 August 2023	
3	MF	(Philippines) Jessika Cowart	(Sweden) Kalmar	Free transfer	1 year	5 September 2023	
20	FW	(Philippines) Quinley Quezada	(Serbia) Red Star Belgrade	Free transfer	1 year	8 September 2023	
29	GK	Lilly Bailey	(Australia) Football West NTC	Free transfer	1 year	19 September 2023	
28	FW	Anika Stajcic	Sydney FC	Free transfer	1 year	21 September 2023	
30	DF	Mischa Anderson	(Australia) Football West NTC	Free transfer	1 year	11 October 2023	
31	MF	Clara Hoarau	(Australia) Murdoch University Melville	Free transfer	1 year	11 October 2023	

=== Transfers out ===
No.	Position	Player	Transferred to	Type/fee	Date	Ref.
3	DF	Kim Carroll	Retired		22 March 2023	
15	FW	(United States) Cyera Hintzen	(United States) Gotham FC	End of contract	1 July 2023	
20	GK	Sarah Langman	Central Coast Mariners	Free transfer	4 August 2023	
—	MF	Aideen Keane	Sydney FC	Free transfer	10 August 2023	
23	FW	Alana Jancevski	Adelaide United	Free transfer	17 August 2023	
14	FW	(New Zealand) Hannah Blake	Adelaide United	Free transfer	23 August 2023	
6	MF	Tijan McKenna	Melbourne City	Free transfer	29 August 2023	
21	MF	Ella Mastrantonio	(Austria) SKN St. Pölten	Undisclosed	31 August 2023	
24	FW	Milan Hammond	Newcastle Jets	Undisclosed	20 September 2023	
9	FW	Demi Koulizakis	Unattached	End of contract	28 September 2023	
11	FW	(United States) Rylee Baisden	Unattached	End of contract	28 September 2023	
42	FW	(United States) Gabriella Coleman	Unattached	End of contract	28 September 2023	

=== Contract extensions ===
No.	Position	Player	Duration	Date	Ref.
4	Natasha Rigby	Defender	1 year	10 July 2023	
8	Hana Lowry	Midfielder	1 year	11 July 2023	
12	Sofia Sakalis	Defender	1 year	11 July 2023	
18	Sadie Lawrence	Midfielder	1 year	17 July 2023	
13	Sarah Cain	Midfielder	1 year	17 July 2023	
19	Isabella Foletta	Defender	1 year	17 July 2023	
10	Susan Phonsongkham	Midfielder	1 year	24 July 2023	
1	Morgan Aquino	Midfielder	1 year	24 July 2023	
22	Claudia Mihocic	Defender	1 year	24 July 2023	
7	Elizabeth Anton	Defender	1 year	31 July 2023	

== Pre-season and friendlies ==
24 September 2023 Gold Fields Challenge Cup	WA State Team (Western Australia)	0–4	Perth Glory	Perth
16:00		Report	Sakalis 13'; Farrow 26', 33', 34'	Stadium: State Football Centre; Referee: Shane Skinner

== Competitions ==
=== Overall record ===
Competition	First match	Last match	Starting round	Record							
Competition	First match	Last match	Starting round	Pld	W	D	L	GF	GA	GD	Win %
A-League Women	14 October 2023	31 March 2024	Matchday 1	22	6	6	10	25	32	−7	27.27
Total				22	6	6	10	25	32	−7	27.27

Last updated: 31 March 2024
Source: Soccerway

=== A-League Women ===
==== League table ====
Pos	Team	Pld	W	D	L	GF	GA	GD	Pts
8	Wellington Phoenix (Note: Wellington Phoenix cannot qualify for Asian Football Confederation competitions as they are based in New Zealand, which is under the Oceania Football Confederation.)	22	9	1	12	36	33	+3	28
9	Brisbane Roar	22	7	5	10	28	35	−7	26
10	Perth Glory	22	6	6	10	25	32	−7	24
11	Canberra United	22	6	6	10	39	47	−8	24
12	Adelaide United	22	4	3	15	21	56	−35	15

Source: A-Leagues
Rules for classification: 1) points; 2) wins; 3) goal difference; 4) goals scored; 5) head-to-head results; 6) Fair Play points; 7) away head-to-head results; 8) home head-to-head results; 9) toss of a coin

==== Results summary ====
Overall								Home						Away					
Pld	W	D	L	GF	GA	GD	Pts	W	D	L	GF	GA	GD	W	D	L	GF	GA	GD
21	7	5	9	25	30	−5	26	3	4	3	11	13	−2	4	1	6	14	17	−3

Last updated: 31 March 2024.
Source: KEEPUP

==== Results by round ====
Round	1	2	3	4	5	6	7	8	9	10	11	12	13	14	15	16	17	18	19	20	21	22
Ground	H	H	A	H	H	A	A	H	A	A	H	N	H	A	A	H	H	A	H	A	A	H
Result	W	W	W	W	D	L	W	D	L	W	L	D	D	L	L	D	L	D	L	L	L	L
Position	2	1	1	1	1	2	1	1	2	2	2	2	3	4	5	6	7	7	7	8	10	10
Points	3	6	9	12	13	13	16	17	17	20	20	21	22	22	22	23	23	24	24	24	24	24

Source: KEEPUP
A = Away; H = Home; N = Neutral; W = Win; D = Draw; L = Loss

==== Matches ====
Win Draw Loss

14 October 2023 1	Perth Glory	2–0	Western United	Perth
19:00 AWST	Phonsongkham 49'; Jale 79'	Report		Stadium: Macedonia Park; Attendance: 1,114; Referee: Isabella Blaess

22 October 2023 2	Perth Glory	1–0	Newcastle Jets	Perth
14:00 AWST	Phonsongkham 50'	Report		Stadium: HBF Park; Attendance: 1,450; Referee: Bec Mackie

4 November 2023 3	Canberra United	2–3	Perth Glory	Canberra
16:00 AEDT	Clough 16'; Milivojević 45' (pen.)	Report	Rigby 12'; Jale 40'; Sakalis 51' (pen.)	Stadium: McKellar Park; Attendance: 2,229; Referee: Isabella Libri

11 November 2023 4	Perth Glory	2–1	Adelaide United	Perth
19:00 AWST	Jale 50'; Phonsongkham 86'	Report	Holmes 43'	Stadium: Macedonia Park; Attendance: 1,231; Referee: Georgia Ghirardello

18 November 2023 5	Perth Glory	2–2	Melbourne Victory	Perth
19:00 AWST	Lowry 24', 90+6'	Report	Lowe 79', 84'	Stadium: Macedonia Park; Attendance: 1,533; Referee: Caitlin Williams

25 November 2023 6	Wellington Phoenix	2–1	Perth Glory	Auckland
14:45 NZDT	Breslin 48'; Knott 61'	Report	Farrow 21'	Stadium: Go Media Stadium; Attendance: 5,532; Referee: Bec Mackie

9 December 2023 7	Melbourne City	1–3	Perth Glory	Melbourne
16:00 AEDT	Wilkinson 17'	Report	Farrow 32', 51', 71'	Stadium: B.T. Connor Reserve; Attendance: 432; Referee: Kate Jacewicz
Note: Match originally set to play at City Football Academy, but changed due to ongoing constructions at the venue. It was relocated to B.T. Connor Reserve.

17 December 2023 8	Perth Glory	0–0	Sydney FC	Perth
19:00 AWST		Report		Stadium: Macedonia Park; Attendance: 1,568; Referee: Shane Skinner

22 December 2023 9	Western United	1–0	Perth Glory	Melbourne
17:00 AEDT	Logarzo 18'	Report		Stadium: City Vista Recreation Reserve; Attendance: 1,900; Referee: Rebecca Durcau
Note: Match originally scheduled for 19:00 AEDT. It was rescheduled for 17:00 AEDT.

31 December 2023 10	Central Coast Mariners	1–2	Perth Glory	Gosford
16:15 AEDT	Badawiya 69'	Report	Farrow 7', 66'	Stadium: Industree Group Stadium; Attendance: 5,130; Referee: Kate Jacewicz

7 January 2024 11	Perth Glory	0–2	Western Sydney Wanderers	Perth
19:00 AWST		Report	Harding 24', 72'	Stadium: Macedonia Park; Attendance: 1,469; Referee: Isabella Mossin

12 January 2024 12	Melbourne Victory	1–1	Perth Glory	Sydney
17:00 AEDT	Lowe 28'	Report	Rankin 60' (o.g.)	Stadium: Leichhardt Oval; Attendance: 1,130; Referee: Caitlin Williams
Note: Originally scheduled for 14 January 2024, was moved due to Unite Round.

20 January 2024 13	Perth Glory	0–0	Brisbane Roar	Perth
19:00 AWST		Report		Stadium: Macedonia Park; Attendance: 1,205; Referee: Mikayla Ryan

27 January 2024 14	Adelaide United	2–1	Perth Glory	Adelaide
17:00 ACDT	Sasaski 45+2'; I. Hodgson 47'	Report	Lowry 23'	Stadium: Marden Sports Complex; Attendance: 903; Referee: Isabella Mossin

3 February 2024 15	Sydney FC	3–1	Perth Glory	Sydney
19:00 AEDT	Caspers 24'; Vine 59', 85'	Report	Quezada 33'	Stadium: Leichhardt Oval; Attendance: 3,266; Referee: Isabella Libri

10 February 2024 16	Perth Glory	2–2	Canberra United	Perth
19:00 AWST	Phonsongkham 35'; Dalton 90+2'	Report	Heyman 9', 44'	Stadium: Macedonia Park; Attendance: 1,003; Referee: Rebecca Durcau

18 February 2024 17	Perth Glory	1–3	Central Coast Mariners	Perth
19:30 AWST	Farrow 25'	Report	Simon 46'; Galic 76'; Rasmussen 83'	Stadium: Macedonia Park; Attendance: 901; Referee: Bec Mackie

3 March 2024 18	Newcastle Jets	1–1	Perth Glory	Maitland
16:00 AEDT	Barbieri 77'	Report	Prior 2' (o.g.)	Stadium: Maitland Sportsground; Attendance: 1,727; Referee: Isabella Mossin

8 March 2024 19	Perth Glory	1–3	Wellington Phoenix	Perth
19:00 AWST	Foster 42' (o.g.)	Report	Whinham 24'; Robertson 56'; Fraser 78'	Stadium: Macedonia Park; Attendance: 964; Referee: Georgia Ghirardello

16 March 2024 20	Western Sydney Wanderers	1–0	Perth Glory	Sydney
16:00 AEDT	Harding 53'	Report		Stadium: Wanderers Football Park; Attendance: 427; Referee: Isabella Mossin

24 March 2024 21	Brisbane Roar	2–0	Perth Glory	Brisbane
15:00 AEST	Stephenson 33'; Freier 43'	Report		Stadium: Perry Park; Attendance: 1,848; Referee: Caitlin Williams

31 March 2024 22	Perth Glory	1–2	Melbourne City	Perth
16:30 AWST	Lala 90+4'	Report	Pollicina 8'; McMahon 89'	Stadium: Macedonia Park; Attendance: 1,314; Referee: Isabella Mossin

== Statistics ==
=== Appearances and goals ===
Includes all competitions. Players with no appearances not included in the list.

No.	Pos.	Nat.	Name	A-League Women		Total	
No.	Pos.	Nat.	Name	Apps	Goals	Apps	Goals
1	GK	(Australia)	Morgan Aquino	22	0	22	0
3	DF	(Philippines)	Jessika Cowart	22	0	22	0
4	DF	(Australia)	Natasha Rigby	22	1	22	1
7	DF	(New Zealand)	Elizabeth Anton	19+1	0	20	0
8	MF	(Australia)	Hana Lowry	22	3	22	3
9	FW	(England)	Millie Farrow	20+2	7	22	7
10	FW	(Australia)	Susan Phonsongkham	18+3	4	21	4
11	FW	(New Zealand)	Grace Jale	16+3	3	19	3
12	MF	(Australia)	Sofia Sakalis	14+4	1	18	1
13	MF	(Australia)	Sarah Cain	2+7	0	9	0
14	FW	(Australia)	Tia Stonehill	0+4	0	4	0
17	FW	(Australia)	Abbey Green	0+5	0	5	0
18	MF	(Australia)	Sadie Lawrence	4+8	0	12	0
19	DF	(Australia)	Isabella Foletta	5+4	0	9	0
20	MF	(Philippines)	Quinley Quezada	11+9	1	20	1
22	DF	(Australia)	Claudia Mihocic	13+1	0	14	0
23	MF	(Australia)	Isobel Dalton	14+5	1	19	1
24	GK	(Australia)	Sally James	0+2	0	2	0
25	MF	(Australia)	Grace Johnston	5+9	0	14	0
26	FW	(Australia)	Tanika Lala	0+2	1	2	1
27	MF	(Australia)	Georgia Cassidy	13+6	0	19	0
31	MF	(Australia)	Clara Hoarau	0+5	0	5	0

=== Disciplinary record ===
Includes all competitions. The list is sorted by squad number when total cards are equal. Players with no cards not included in the list.

Rank	No.	Pos.	Nat.	Name	A-League Women			Total		
Rank	No.	Pos.	Nat.	Name	Yellow card	(yellow card) (yellow-red card)	Red card	Yellow card	(yellow card) (yellow-red card)	Red card
1	10	FW	(Australia)	Susan Phonsongkham	5	0	0	5	0	0
2	4	DF	(Australia)	Natasha Rigby	4	0	0	4	0	0
2	8	MF	(Australia)	Hana Lowry	4	0	0	4	0	0
2	9	FW	(England)	Millie Farrow	4	0	0	4	0	0
5	7	DF	(New Zealand)	Elizabeth Anton	3	0	0	3	0	0
6	20	FW	(Philippines)	Quinley Quezada	2	0	0	2	0	0
6	22	DF	(Australia)	Claudia Mihocic	2	0	0	2	0	0
6	27	MF	(Australia)	Georgia Cassidy	2	0	0	2	0	0
9	12	MF	(Australia)	Sofia Sakalis	1	0	0	1	0	0
9	18	MF	(Australia)	Sadie Lawrence	1	0	0	1	0	0
9	23	MF	(Australia)	Isobel Dalton	1	0	0	1	0	0
9	26	FW	(Australia)	Tanika Lala	1	0	0	1	0	0
Total					30	0	0	30	0	0

=== Clean sheets ===
Includes all competitions. The list is sorted by squad number when total clean sheets are equal. Numbers in parentheses represent games where both goalkeepers participated and both kept a clean sheet; the number in parentheses is awarded to the goalkeeper who was substituted on, whilst a full clean sheet is awarded to the goalkeeper who was on the field at the start of play. Goalkeepers with no clean sheets not included in the list.

Rank	No.	Nat.	Goalkeeper	A-League Women	Total
1	1	(Australia)	Morgan Aquino	4	4
Total				4	4

== See also ==
- 2023–24 Perth Glory FC season
