= Clara Hoarau =

Réunionese Australian soccer player (born 2007)

Personal information
- Date of birth: 8 April 2007 (age 19)
- Place of birth: Le Tampon, Réunion, France
- Height: 1.60 m (5 ft 3 in)
- Positions: Midfielder; defender

Team information
- Current team: Fleury
- Number: 6

Senior career*
Years	Team	Apps	(Gls)
2023	Murdoch University Melville		
2023–2024	Perth Glory	5	(0)
2024	Fremantle City		
2024–	Fleury	4	(0)

International career^{‡}
2026–	Australia U20	0	(0)
- * Club domestic league appearances and goals as of 27 March 2026 ‡ National team caps and goals as of 27 March 2026

Clara Hoarau (Réunion Creole French: [kla.ʁa o.ʁo]; born 8 April 2007) is a professional soccer player who plays as a midfielder or defender for Première Ligue club Fleury 91. Born in Réunion, she plays for the Australia under-20 national team. She previously played for National Premier Leagues WA Women (NPL WA Women) clubs Murdoch University Melville and Fremantle City, and for A-League Women club Perth Glory.

== Early life ==
Hoarau was born on 8 April 2007 in Le Tampon, Réunion. She moved to Perth, Western Australia as a child, and is a dual citizen of Australia and France. She attended John Curtin College of the Arts, an independent public co-educational partially selective high school in Fremantle.

== Club career ==
=== Perth Glory ===
Hoarau signed for A-League Women club Perth Glory ahead of the 2023–24 season. She made her début on 24 September 2023, coming on as a 54th-minute substitute for Claudia Mihočić in a 4–0 friendly win over the Western Australia state team at the State Football Centre in Queens Park, held as part of the annual preseason Gold Fields Challenge Cup. She made her competitive début on 10 February 2024, coming on as a 90th-minute substitute for Susan Phonsongkham in a 2–2 draw at home to Canberra United at Macedonia Park in Balcatta. She departed at the end of the season, having made just four league appearances for the club.

=== Fleury 91 ===
Hoarau joined Première Ligue side Fleury 91 ahead of the 2024–25 season, and stayed at the club for the 2025–26 season. She made her début for the club on 1 February 2026, starting and playing 66 minutes in a 1–0 home win over Montpellier at Stade Auguste Gentelet in Fleury-Mérogis.

== International career ==
Hoarau was born in Réunion, an overseas department and region (DROM) of France, making her technically eligible for the Réunion national team. However, Réunion is not a FIFA member and is only an associate member of the Confederation of African Football (CAF), making Réunion ineligible to compete in the FIFA Women's World Cup or the Women's Africa Cup of Nations (WAFCON). Instead, she would be eligible to play for either Australia (where she was raised and began her career) or France (as Réunion is part of Overseas France).

Hoarau was called up for the Australia under-20 national team by head coach Alex Epakis, who previously coached her at Perth Glory, as part of his 23-player squad for the 2026 AFC U-20 Women's Asian Cup in Thailand.

== Career statistics ==
=== Club ===
As of 21 March 2026

Appearances and goals by club, season and competition
Club	Season	League			National cup			League cup			Total	
Club	Season	Division	Apps	Goals	Cup	Apps	Goals	Cup	Apps	Goals	Apps	Goals
Murdoch University Melville	2023	NPL WA Women			—			—				
Perth Glory	2023–24	A-League Women	5	0	—			—			4	0
Fremantle City	2024	NPL WA Women			—			—				
Fleury	2024–25	Première Ligue	0	0	Coupe de France	0	0	—			0	0
Fleury	2025–26	Première Ligue	4	0	Coupe de France	0	0	Coupe LFFP	0	0	4	0
Fleury	Total		4	0	Total	0	0	Total	0	0	4	0

=== International ===
As of 28 March 2026

Appearances and goals by national team and year
National team	Year	Apps	Goals
Australia U20	2026	0	0
Total		0	0
