= Grace Johnston =

Australian soccer player (born 2005)

Personal information
- Date of birth: 7 April 2005 (age 21)
- Place of birth: Perth, Western Australia, Australia
- Positions: Defender; midfielder

Team information
- Current team: Charlton Athletic

Senior career*
Years	Team	Apps	(Gls)
2021–2023	FW NTC		
2023–2026	Perth Glory	39	(0)
2025	Preston Lions	10	(2)
2026	Keilor Park	3	(1)
2026–	Charlton Athletic	0	(0)

International career^{‡}
2023	Australia U20	2	(0)
2025–	Australia U23	4	(1)
- * Club domestic league appearances and goals as of 7 November 2025 ‡ National team caps and goals as of 19 August 2025

Grace Johnston (born 7 April 2005) is an Australian professional soccer player who plays as a midfielder and defender for Women's Super League (WSL) club Charlton Athletic and the Australia under-23 national team.

Born in Perth, Johnston began her career in the A-League Women at her home city club Perth Glory, playing in the offseason for Melbourne-based National Premier Leagues Victoria Women's (NPL Victoria Women's) clubs Keilor Park and Preston Lions. In 2026, she transferred to the WSL, signing for newly-promoted side Charlton Athletic. Internationally, she has represented Australia at under-20 and under-23 level. She won the 2025 ASEAN Women's Championship against senior national teams with the U23 Matildas.

== Early life ==
Johnston was born in 2005 in Perth, Western Australia. She attended Wembley Primary School and, in May 2016, was chosen for her state's Under-12s Girls Football team, which competed for national titles. Also in that team was Georgia Cassidy, who became her long-term teammate. As a junior Johnston played for Subiaco AFC for two seasons.

== Club career ==
=== Football West NTC ===
From 2021 to 2023 Johnston played as a midfielder for the Football West National Training Centre (FW NTC), alongside Cassidy. They competed in the National Premier Leagues WA Women (NPL WA). In 2023, Johnston was part of the FW NTC leadership group, when the team won the State Cup and finished in the top 4 of the NPL WA.

=== Perth Glory ===
In June 2023, Johnston signed with Perth Glory's A-League Women squad, initially for one season. She debuted on 14 October and made 14 appearances in the 2023–24 season. However, her performances were cut short by a syndesmosis injury in round 17. She was re-signed to the team and made 22 further appearances, mostly as a defender, in 2024–25, providing one assist. Her performances earned her a “wildcard” nomination (most votes accumulated throughout the whole season) for the A-League Women's Young Footballer of the Year award for the 2024–25 season. In June 2025 Johnston transferred to Preston Lions FC (women) to compete in the National Premier Leagues Victoria Women (NPLV Women) during the A-League Women's off-season (from June to August). By August she had made 10 appearances, scoring twice. In that same month she re-signed with Perth for the A-League's 2025–26 season.

=== Charlton Athletic ===
On 18 July 2026, Johnston completed a move to newly-promoted Women's Super League club Charlton Athletic ahead of the 2026–27 season.

== International career ==
As a midfielder, Johnston was added to the Australia women's national under-20 soccer team (Young Matildas) training camp in Sydney in August 2023. She was called-up for two friendly games against China by coach Leah Blayney on 3 and 6 December 2023 in Xiamen, China.

Johnston was named in the Australia U-23 squad as a defender. She competed for the 2025 ASEAN Women's Championship held in Vietnam in August. Her team played against senior national women's squads from the ASEAN Football Federation (AFF). Johnston scored her team's fourth goal in the 9–0 group-stage win over Timor-Leste. According to Kieran Yap from Impetus Football, "Johnston scored the most spectacular goal of the match in the shadows of half time. The Perth Glory defender cut inside from the left and unleashed a rocket from 25 yards". Australia went on to win the tournament, defeating Myanmar 1–0 in the final.

== Style of play ==
Johnston is regarded as a versatile player, capable of operating both in central midfield and as a full-back defender, combining defensive strength with composure on the ball.

== Career statistics ==
=== Club ===
As of match played 7 November 2025

Club	Season	League			National cup		League cup		Continental		Total	
Club	Season	Division	Apps	Goals	Apps	Goals	Apps	Goals	Apps	Goals	Apps	Goals
Perth Glory	2023–24	A-League	14	0	—		—		—		14	0
Perth Glory	2024–25	A-League	22	0	—		—		—		22	0
Perth Glory	2025–26	A-League	3	0	—		—		—		3	0
Perth Glory	Total		39	0	—		—		—		39	0
Career total			36	0	0	0	0	0	0	0	36	0

== Honours ==
International

- Australia U-23
  - ASEAN Women's Championship: Champions (2025)

Individual

- Young Footballer of the Year (Wildcard nominee): 2024–25
