= Natasha Rigby =

Australian soccer player (born 1993)

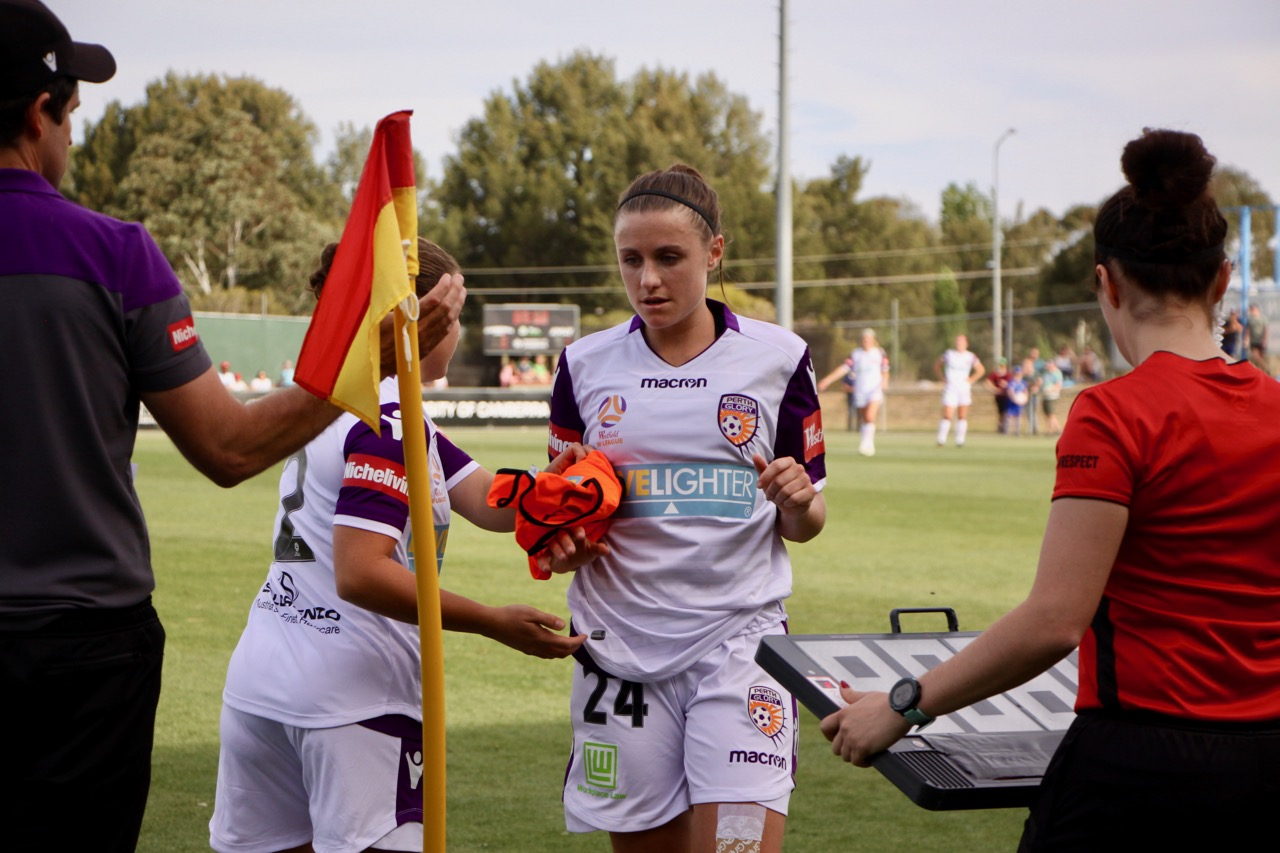
- Rigby playing for Perth Glory in 2018

Personal information
- Full name: Natasha Rigby
- Date of birth: 24 January 1993 (age 33)
- Place of birth: Margaret River, Australia
- Position: Defender

Youth career
- 2008–10: Western Australia U16
- University of Western Australia
- Queens Park SC

Senior career*
Years	Team	Apps	(Gls)
2016–2024	Perth Glory	117	(2)
- * Club domestic league appearances and goals as of 31 March 2024 (UTC)

Natasha Rigby (born 24 January 1993) is a former Australian soccer player who played for Perth Glory in the A-League Women.

== Early life ==
Rigby grew up in Margaret River, a small town south of Perth. There was no girls' soccer team, and she played with the boys. Between the ages of 15 and 17, Rigby represented Western Australia in the National Youth Championships.

At age 18, Rigby moved to Perth to study sports science at the University of Western Australia, where she also played in the state league.

== Club career ==
Rigby was given an opportunity with the Glory for the 2016–17 W-League season, after being scouted following a pre-season friendly game between a select Western Australian state team and Perth Glory in 2015. She started as a squad member, and worked her way on to the bench and finally into the starting team.

Rigby played a role in Glory's 2016–17 run to the grand final, which they lost to Melbourne City.

Following Sam Kerr's move from Perth to Europe on the eve of the 2019–20 season, Rigby took over the role of captain. She currently holds the longest active streak of any sole captain in the A-League Women, having been captain for five consecutive seasons.

Rigby became only the third player to reach 100 appearances for Perth Glory Women on 18 November 2023, starting in a 2–2 draw against Newcastle Jets.

Rigby announced her retirement from professional football on 3 May 2024, marking 117 consecutive appearances for Perth Glory.

== Personal life ==
For the 2020–21 W-League, the national competition was heavily disrupted due to travel restrictions and quarantine requirements caused by COVID-19, as well as the exodus of many top level Australian players to the FA Women's Super League. Rigby was required to manage her commitment to full time employment as a prison officer at a women's prison with her footballing career. Coinciding with her retirement from playing in 2024, Rigby was appointed to Football West as manager of Female Football and Advocacy.

Beyond football, Rigby engages in charitable work to improve literacy amongst Indigenous Australians, and supports mental health initiatives in the community.

Rigby was previously in a relationship with AFLW player Angelique Stannett, with whom they announced their engagement in February 2023.

On 7 September 2025, Rigby revealed on Instagram that she is expecting her first child with partner Devyn.
