= Casey Dumont =

Australian football player

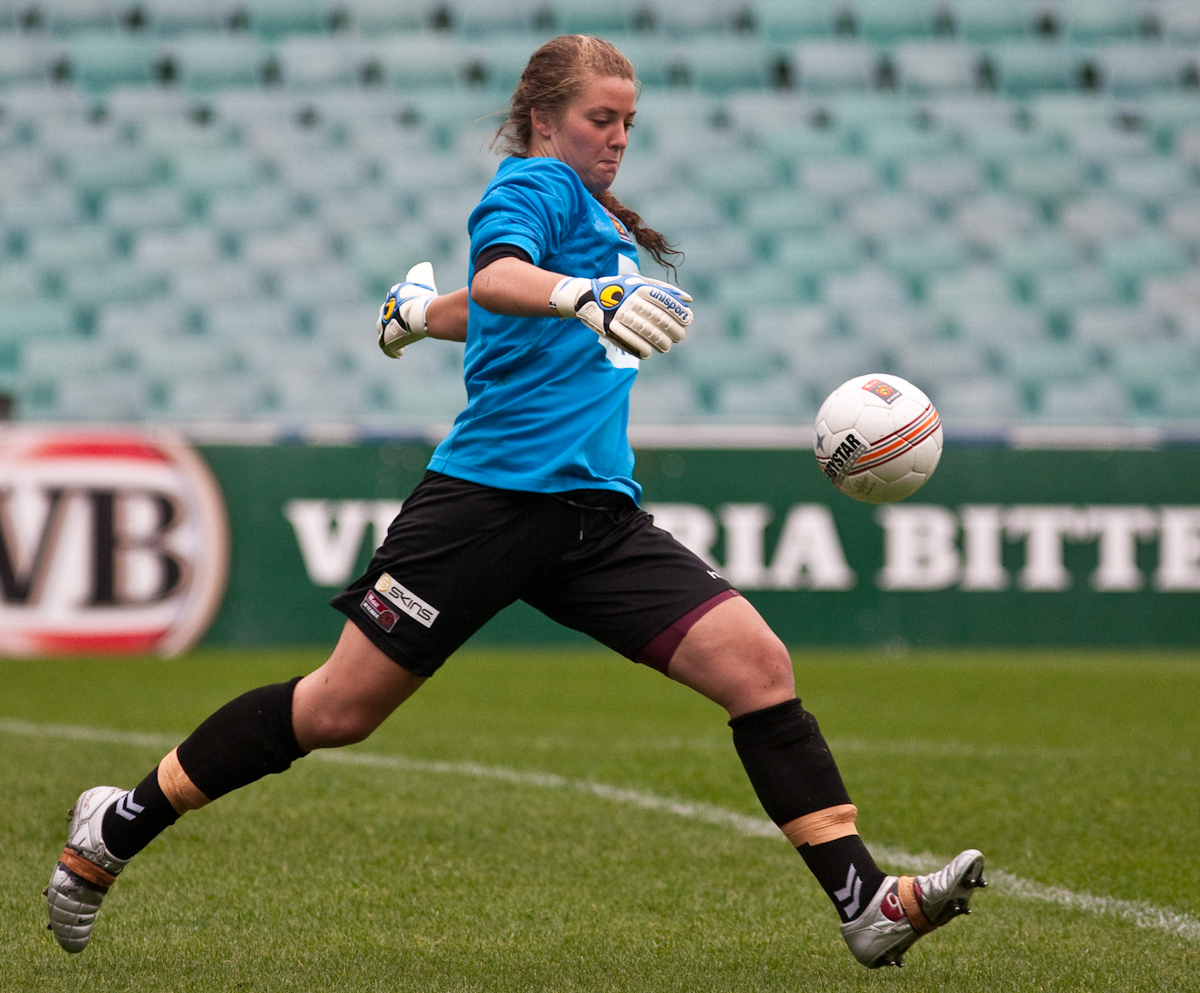
- Dumont playing for Brisbane Roar in 2009

Personal information
- Full name: Casey Narelle Dumont
- Date of birth: 25 January 1992 (age 34)
- Place of birth: Sydney, Australia
- Height: 1.85 m (6 ft 1 in)
- Position: Goalkeeper

Youth career
- Robina SC
- Burleigh SC
- Palm Beach

Senior career*
Years	Team	Apps	(Gls)
- Palm Beach
- Gold Coast
2008–2013	Brisbane Roar	44	(0)
2013–2015	Sydney FC	20	(0)
2016–2017	Western Sydney Wanderers	1	(0)
2017–2023	Melbourne Victory	71	(0)
2023–2024	Central Coast Mariners	12	(0)
2024–2025	Perth Glory	17	(0)

International career^{‡}
2006–2007	Australia U-17	8	(0)
2006–2011	Australia U-20	15	(0)
2015–	Australia	3	(0)
Australian rules football career
Personal information
- Position: Utility
Playing career
Years	Club	Games (Goals)
2023–2024	Hawthorn	0 (0)
- * Club domestic league appearances and goals as of 8 December 2024 (UTC) ‡ National team caps and goals as of 24 July 2016

Casey Narelle Dumont (born 25 January 1992) is an Australian professional sportswoman. She is a soccer player who has played as a goalkeeper for multiple A-League Women clubs and the Australia national team. She has also played Australian rules football, being listed with Hawthorn in the AFL Women's.

In soccer, Dumont has developed a reputation for excelling in penalty shootouts; Dumont has been involved in five of the eight penalty shootouts that have happened in the A-League Women finals series, with Dumont's team emerging victorious in all five.

== Early life and biography ==
Dumont was born in 1992 in Sydney and was brought up on the Gold Coast, by her mother with two siblings. Her parents had separated when she was about nine years old. Initially, she tried soccer but did not like it and played other sports: netball, athletics, softball and swimming, before returning to soccer by the age 12. In 2013, Dumont qualified as a registered nurse. In May 2025, Dumont was recruited by former teammate Melissa Barbieri to join the blind football national team for women (the Bilbies) as their goalkeeper (only sighted player allowed).

== Soccer ==
=== Club career ===
==== Early career ====
Dumont started her senior career with Palm Beach and Gold Coast before joining the W-League with Brisbane Roar, with whom she won three trophies and Sydney FC before joining Western Sydney Wanderers in 2016.

==== Melbourne Victory ====
On 18 September 2017, Dumont joined Melbourne Victory. Dumont missed the 2020–21 W-League season due to injury, but re-signed with Melbourne Victory ahead of the 2021–22 A-League Women season. In May 2022, Dumont was named the A-League Women Goalkeeper of the Year for the first time as Melbourne Victory won the 2021–22 A-League Women. Following the 2022–23 A-League Women season, Dumont left Melbourne Victory after joining Australian rules football club Hawthorn, with Melbourne Victory choosing not to retain her.

==== Central Coast Mariners ====
In November 2023, it was announced that Dumont returned to the A-League Women, joining Central Coast Mariners, who supported her dual code ambitions. In August 2024, the club announced her departure.

==== Perth Glory ====
Perth Glory announced the signing of Dumont on 8 October 2024, and will join the club at the conclusion of the 2024 AFLW season. On 8 December 2024, Dumont became the first goalkeeper to reach 150 appearances in the A-League Women. She left Perth Glory on 30 May 2025 after their 2024–25 season, and overall she made a total of 165 appearances with 49 clean sheets for her A-League clubs (Brisbane Roar [20], Sydney FC [5], Melbourne Victory [19], Central Coast Mariners [3], Perth Glory [2]).

=== International career ===
Dumont played eight games for the Australia U-17 side from 2006 to 2007. The goalkeeper had 15 games for the Australia U-20s from 2006 to 2011. She was first called up to a senior Matildas training squad in January 2010, ahead of the AFC Women's Asian Cup, held in China. She remained on the substitution bench for all of Australia's games. The Matildas won the final after a penalty shoot-out against North Korea. She was also named to Australia's 2011 Women's World Cup squad. However, due to mounting pain from misdiagnosed injuries Dumont missed the tournament with "severe osteitis pubis, multiple stress fractures, ligament and tendon damage of the pelvis and inflammation of hip sockets/joints".

After recovering from her hip and lower back injuries, Dumont resumed her club career. She finally made her debut for the Matildas in a friendly against New Zealand in Auckland on 12 February 2015. The keeper was subbed off for Brianna Davey after injuring her anterior cruciate ligament (ACL) in the final minutes of the game. Dumont later recalled, "It was a freekick. I came up and punched the ball and New Zealand defender hit me – I struck my leg out and my leg hit the ground and hyper-extended and I felt it straight away. The pain was excruciating. I remember just laying there on the ground with the ball still in play and New Zealand scored because I was on the ground. And I remember feeling that this was supposed to be the best time of my life. I'd finally gotten a chance to play and I was injured." She underwent a rehabilitation schedule and hence was unavailable for the 2015 FIFA Women's World Cup in Canada in June–July.

Dumont was named to the 20-member Matildas squad for the 2016 AFC Women's Olympic Qualifying Tournament's third round, which was held in Japan in February–March. Coach Alen Stajcic explained her selection, "[she] has come back from her knee reconstruction. She’s still got a bit of a way to go to regain full fitness, but she has certainly worked hard over the past three months to get back into the squad." After qualifying, Dumont was subbed on to replace fellow keeper Mackenzie Arnold in a friendly 2–0 win against New Zealand in May. As the Olympic squad comprised 18 members, Stajcic cut her from the final roster.

=== Honours ===
==== Club ====
Brisbane Roar

- W-League Premiership: 2008–09
- W-League Championship: 2008–09, 2010–11

Melbourne Victory

- W-League Premiership/A-League Women: 2018–19, 2021–22

==== International ====
Australia

- AFC Women's Asian Cup: 2010
- AFC Olympic Qualifying Tournament: 2016

==== Individual ====
- A-League Women Goalkeeper Of The Year: 2021–22

== Australian rules football ==
Ahead of the 2023 AFL Women's season, Dumont signed with Hawthorn in the AFL Women's as an other-sport rookie. In Australian rules, she was a utility player.

She was on Hawthorn's list for two seasons without playing a game before being delisted.

=== Statistics ===
Legend
G	Goals	K	Kicks	D	Disposals	T	Tackles
B	Behinds	H	Handballs	M	Marks

Season	Team	No.	Games	Totals							Averages (per game)							Votes
Season	Team	No.	Games	G	B	K	H	D	M	T	G	B	K	H	D	M	T	Votes
2023	Hawthorn	26	0	—	—	—	—	—	—	—	—	—	—	—	—	—	—	0
2024	Hawthorn	26	0	—	—	—	—	—	—	—	—	—	—	—	—	—	—	0
Career			0	—	—	—	—	—	—	—	—	—	—	—	—	—	—	0
