= National Premier Leagues Western Australia Women's =

- Founded: 2020
- Country: Australia
- Number of clubs: 8
- Level on pyramid: 2
- Current champions: Balcatta (2025)
- Website: footballwest.com.au
- Current: 2025 Season

The National Premier Leagues WA Women, also known as the NPL WA Women, is a soccer competition in Western Australia. The competition is conducted by Football West, the organising body in Western Australia. The league is a subdivision of the second tier National Premier Leagues Women's structure, which sits below the national A-League Women, it is the highest tier of local women's competition in Western Australia. The league was founded in 2020 in Western Australia, several years behind equivalent leagues in other states.

== History ==
=== Women's First Division and Premier League ===
The first full season for women's teams in the Perth area took place in 1972, the year after a high-profile curtain-raiser for two women's teams prior to a major friendly between the WA Men's State team and Dynamo Moscow. The inaugural season saw a single six team league comprising teams form Swan Athletic (originally named Midland), Azzurri, Kwinana United, South Perth United, Balga, Sorrento with Swan Athletic winning the first ever WA Women's Division 1 title.

The First Division was eventually renamed the State Premier League with clubs being required to field both a first team and reserves team (open age). In the final year of the State Premier League (2019) the league comprised Northern Redbacks, Queens Park SC, Balcatta SC, Fremantle City, Football West NTC, and Stirling Panthers.

=== National Premier League ===
In late 2019 Football West called for applications for the a new NPL Women's competition to take the place of the existing State Premier League competition as the highest tier of local women's football in the state. At that time Western Australia was one of the two remaining states (along with Tasmania) yet to implement a local version of the National Premier League Women's competition with NSW being the first state to implement their NPL competition in 2013.

Eight teams were selected to form the new National Premier League Women Western Australia (NPLW WA) including three existing State Premier League clubs (Northern Redbacks, Balcatta, Fremantle City), the existing Football West National Training Centre (NTC) program team, two clubs from the women's second division (Subiaco AFC, Curtin University) and two clubs that would form brand new senior teams to compete in the NPLW WA (Murdoch University Melville, Perth SC).

Controversially Queens Park SC, a member of the first division from 1973 and winner of five Division 1 titles including the 2017 and 2018 titles plus the winner of Top 4 Cup in 2019, was not selected as one of the inaugural teams for the NPLW WA, with most of its team members moving to the newly formed Murdoch University Melville team.

The NPLW WA was formed with clubs being required to field both a first team and an U-23 which was later changed for the 2022 to be an U-21's team.

=== Relocations, mergers and name changes ===
Over the history of the Women's First Division, Premier League and NPLW teams have been subject to a number of name changes, relocations and mergers. The reasoning for many of the relocations and name changes stemmed from women's teams not being truly integrated into traditionally male dominated clubs often having to deal with poor conditions for training and games. Teams therefore would often move as a whole to a new clubs or location under a new name in order to improve conditions.

This movement of teams clouds the early historical record keeping due to modern day incarnation of clubs having descended directly from teams that held one or many other names.

- Perth RedStar FC / Northern Redbacks / Stirling Reds / Stirling Vasto / Morley Windmills

Perth Redstar came into existence from a merger between ECU Joondalup and the Women's only club Northern Redbacks SC, prior to this Northern Redbacks had been subject to a number of name changes. Initially as Morley Windmills the club won two titles in 1991 and 1992 before becoming Stirling Vasto and winning two titles in 1994 and 1995, the club then changed name to Stirling Reds winning 3 titles in 1996, 1998 and 1999. After a merger with Sorrento the club became Northern Redbacks which it remained before playing its final game under that name when it won the 2022 NPLW Night Series Final.

- Balcatta Etna FC / Balcatta FC / Floreat

Balcatta Etna was formed in 1978 but changed its name in 1994 to Balcatta Soccer Club then later Balcatta Football Club before returning to their original name of Balcatta Etna FC. The Floreat Athena team that won the 2000 and 2002 Women's first division moved to Balcatta SC.

- Fremantle City FC / East Fremantle Tricolore / Fremantle United SC

Fremantle City FC was formed in 2015 and over the course of the 2015-2018 seasons through a merger between Fremantle United SC and East Fremantle SC.

Fremantle United SC had fielded many women's teams in various divisions over the years including the First Division winning their one and only title in 1997.

East Fremantle SC (formerly known as East Fremantle Tricolore SC) were a club that grew strong in women's football during the 90s. They had previously had two stints in the first division, from 2003 to 2012 followed by relegation to the second division followed by promotion back to the first division in 2016. The club missed out on a first division title in 2009 by goal difference only to Balcatta SC.

- Murdoch University Melville FC (MUM FC)

Murdoch University and Melville City SC were separate entities with both clubs fielding teams that had previously competed in women's football.
Murdoch Universities women's team folded in 2007 when they along with three other teams from the second division were promoted to the first division. The club won its only first division title in 2001 the last club outside of the big 4 (Balcatta, Northern Redbacks, Queens Park and Beckenham) to do so for 19 years until the start of the NPLW.
Melville City SC had previously competed in the first division from 2013 to 2017 making one Cup final during that time.
In 2017 both clubs merged to form Murdoch University Melville FC with the club being granted a spot in the newly formed NPL Women WA in 2020.

- UWA Nedlands FC / Nedlands SC / University of Western Australia SC (UWA SC) / University

Formed after a merger between neighbouring clubs Nedlands SC and University of Western Australia SC. University had existed since 1969 adopting the name common to all University of WA sports clubs of simply University given that at the time there was only one university (a motto that would go on to form their club song). As more University's were created in Perth the club changed name to the University of Western Australia Soccer Club and took this name up to the Premier League with them in 2007.
Nedlands Soccer Club was a relatively young soccer club ironically playing its home games out of Charles Court Reserve, closer to the University of Western Australia than UWA SC's actual home ground in Mount Claremont. Nedlands SC's women's team spent two unsuccessful years in the Premier Division between 2008 and 2009 before they merged with UWA SC. The clubs entered the 2010 season in the Premier League as UWA Nedlands SC.

- Subiaco AFC / Subiaco United / Subiaco City JSC / Curtin University Women's Soccer Club

Formed from a merger between Subiaco United and Subiaco City Junior Soccer Club. Prior to this Curtin University Women's Soccer Club had moved to Subiaco in 2001 to form the basis of the modern incarnation of Subiaco's women's teams.

- South West Phoenix FC

Bunbury club South West Phoenix changed their name in 2010 to Bunbury Forum Force due to a sponsorship deal with Bunbury Forum shopping centre. They have since reverted to their original name of South West Phoenix.

- Melville Alemannia - defunct

Alemannia was created in 1969 as the sporting arm of the Rhein-Donnau German Club in Myaree, changing its name later to Melville Alemannia. In 1976 the club was fielded its first team in the local women's competitions. In 1984 the club won the First Division Top 4 Cup and then followed this up in 1987 by winning their one and only First Division League title. Melville Alemannia played their games out of John Connell Reserve nearby to where Leeming Strikers now play their games.

- Ashfield Dynamos

Ashfield Dynamos was the original name of the current Ashfield Sports Club. For many years Ashfield had not fielded a team in women's competitions until they began again in the metropolitan leagues in 2019 after the Morley Windmills team moved to Ashfield.

- Ascot / Forrestfield United - defunct

Ascot are historically one of the most successful women's club in WA having won 9 first division titles out of the first 15 years of the competition. Ascot the club disappeared as a stand-alone entity back in 1979 after they lost their home ground to baseball and agreed to merge with Kalamunda United SC and Manning Rovers to form Forrestfield United. It is unsure how closely the women's team's history is linked to the men's club as the Ascot name remained in existence until 1986.

- Swan Athletic
- Osborne Park Galeb - defunct
- Inglewood Kiev Eagles
- Stirling Cracovia

== Clubs ==
The following 8 clubs competed in the National Premier Leagues WA Women's competition for the 2026 season.

Balcatta FC
Football West Academy
Fremantle City
Perth Azzurri
Perth RedStar
Sorrento FC
Subiaco AFC
UWA-Nedlands FC

== Team Honours ==
=== League ===
Season	Competition	Premiers
2026	NPLW WA	Perth Azzurri
2025	NPLW WA	Perth SC
2024	NPLW WA	Perth RedStar
2023	NPLW WA	Perth RedStar
2022	NPLW WA	Perth RedStar
2021	NPLW WA	Murdoch University Melville
2020	NPLW WA	Murdoch University Melville
2019	Women's Premier League	Northern Redbacks
2018	Women's Premier League	Queens Park
2017	Women's Premier League	Queens Park
2016	Women's Premier League	Northern Redbacks
2015	Women's Premier League	Northern Redbacks
2014	Women's Premier League	Queens Park
2013	Women's Premier League	Northern Redbacks
2012	Women's Premier League	Beckenham Angels
2011	Women's Premier League	Northern Redbacks
2010	Women's Premier League	Balcatta FC
2009	Women's Premier League	Balcatta FC
2008	Women's Premier League	Queens Park
2007	Women's Premier League	Balcatta FC
2006	Women's Premier League	Queens Park
2005	Women's Premier League	Northern Redbacks
2004	Women's Premier League	Northern Redbacks
2003	Women's Premier League	Northern Redbacks
2002	Women's Premier League	Floreat
2001	Women's Premier League	Murdoch University
2000	Division 1	Floreat
1999	Division 1	Stirling Reds
1998	Division 1	Stirling Reds
1997	Division 1	Fremantle United
1996	Division 1	Stirling Reds
1995	Division 1	Stirling Vasto
1994	Division 1	Stirling Vasto
1993	Division 1	Inglewood Kiev
1992	Division 1	Morley-Windmills
1991	Super League	Morley-Windmills
1990	Super League	Ashfield Dynamos
1989	Division 1	Ashfield Dynamos
1988	Division 1	Ashfield Dynamos
1987	Division 1	Melville Allemania
1986	Division 1	Ascot
1985	Division 1	Ascot
1984	Division 1	Kelmscott
1983	Division 1	Ascot
1982	Division 1	Stirling Cracovia
1981	Division 1	Inglewood Kiev Eagles
1980	Division 1	Inglewood Kiev Eagles
1979	Division 1	Ascot
1978	Division 1	Ascot
1977	Division 1	Ascot
1976	Division 1	Osborne Park Galeb
1975	Division 1	Ascot
1974	Division 1	Ascot
1973	Division 1	Ascot
1972	Division 1	Swan Athletic

=== Cup Competitions ===
Cup competitions have been run irregularly in the history of women's football in WA, mostly due to a lack of numbers until the 1990s. Later on, the cup competitions saw regular withdrawals from teams in the lower divisions as scores tended towards double figures when drawn against teams in higher divisions. Now the competitions is exclusively for the NPLW and State League teams, with the lower-tier leagues having their own cup competition.

Season	Night Series	State Cup	Top 4 Cup
2026	Balcatta FC	Balcatta FC	Fremantle City
2025	Balcatta FC	Fremantle City	Balcatta FC
2024	Perth RedStar	Perth SC	Perth RedStar
2023	Fremantle City	Football West NTC	Perth RedStar
2022	Northern Redbacks (Note: subsequently became known as Perth RedStar FC.)	Perth RedStar	Perth RedStar
2021	Balcatta FC	Murdoch University Melville	Murdoch University Melville
2020	Fremantle City	not held	Northern Redbacks
2019	Queens Park	Northern Redbacks	Queens Park
2018	Football West NTC	Queens Park	Balcatta FC
2017	Queens Park	Northern Redbacks	not held
2016	Queens Park	Northern Redbacks	not held
2015	Northern Redbacks	Beckenham Angels	not held
2014	Beckenham Angels	Northern Redbacks	not held
2013	Northern Redbacks	Beckenham Angels	not held
2012	Beckenham Angels	Northern Redbacks	not held
2011	Queens Park	Northern Redbacks	not held
2010	Balcatta FC	Northern Redbacks	not held
2009	East Fremantle	Northern Redbacks	not held
2008	Football West NTC	Northern Redbacks	Balcatta FC
2007	East Fremantle	Queens Park	Balcatta FC
2006	Balcatta FC	not held	East Fremantle
2005	Northern Redbacks	Queens Park	Queens Park
2004	Northern Redbacks	not held	Northern Redbacks
2003			
2002			
2001			
2000			
1999			
1998			
1997			
1996			Fremantle United
1995			
1994			
1993			
1992			
1991			
1990			Ashfield Dynamos
1989			Ashfield Dynamos
1988			Ashfield Dynamos
1987			Inglewood Kiev
1986			
1985			Melville Alemannia
1984			Kelmscott
1983			Ascot
1982			Stirling Cracovia
1981			Ascot
1980			Inglewood Kiev Eagles
1979			Ascot
1978			Osborne Park Galeb
1977			Ascot
1976			Osborne Park Galeb
1975			Ascot
1974			Ascot
1973			Ascot
1972			

== Individual Honours ==
=== Coach of the Year ===
Records from the Women's Soccer of Western Australia don't list any records for a Coach of the Year award. Football West added this award approximately around 2011. Traditionally the award was given to the coach based on points given for games won, generally this would go to the coach of the league winning team, however in the case of the league being won on goal difference (and therefore the same number of wins), there were cases where the number of cup wins influenced the winner of coach of the year.
In 2021 Football West awarded a Male Coach of the Year and Female Coach of the Year, rather than an NPL-M and NPL-W coach of the year.
From 2022 Football West awarded the NPLW Coach of the Year and a separate Female Coach of the Year award, with the female coach of the year not being restricted to coaches only in the NPLW.

Season	Coach Of The Year	Female Coach Of The Year
2025	Tom Glavovich (Perth SC)	Sam Geddes (Fremantle City)
2024	Carlos Vega Mena (Perth Redstar)	Danielle Brogan (Perth SC)
2023	Carlos Vega Mena (Perth Redstar)	Faye Chambers (Fremantle City)
2022	Carlos Vega Mena (Perth Redstar)	Sam Geddes (Hyundai NTC U16)
2021	not awarded	Danielle Brogan (Perth SC)
2020	Peter Rakic (Murdoch University Melville)	
2019	Conrad McKelvie (Northern Redbacks)	
2018	Ben Anderton (Queens Park)	
2017	Ben Anderton (Queens Park)	
2016	Tim Hodgson (Northern Redbacks)	
2015	Conrad McKelvie (Northern Redbacks)	
2014	Tim Hodgson (Northern Redbacks)	
2013	Neil Bennett (Northern Redbacks)	
2012	Jason Washington-King (Beckenham Angels)	
2011	Tim Hodgson (Northern Redbacks)	

=== Player of the Year ===
Sandra Brentnall leads the tally of most player of the year trophies with 6, followed by Stacey Woodfin on 5 and Katarina Jukic on 4.

Season	Winner
2025	Abbey Green (Fremantle City)
2024	Ella Lincoln (Perth SC)
2023	Laura Waltman (Fremantle City)
2022	Larissa Walsh (Perth Redstar)
2021	Tia Stonehill (Murdoch University Melville)
2020	Katarina Jukic (Murdoch University Melville)
2019	Shawn Billam (Northern Redbacks); Laura Waltman (Fremantle City); Gemma Craine (Fremantle City)
2018	Katarina Jukic (Queens Park)
2017	Katarina Jukic (Queens Park)
2016	Marianna Tabain (Beckenham Angels)
2015	Abbey Meakins (Football West NTC)
2014	Brooke Johnston (Queens Park)
2013	Stacey Woodfin (Queens Park)
2012	Allice Corriea (East Fremantle)
2011	Stacey Woodfin (Queens Park)
2010	Lisa Ward (Bunbury Forum Force)
2009	Jess Lindquist (Queens Park)
2008	Stacey Woodfin (Queens Park)
2007	Prue Cornish (Balcatta)
2006	Elisa D'Ovidio (Balcatta)
2005	Stacey Woodfin (Queens Park)
2004	Stacey Woodfin (Queens Park)
2003	Sarah Cunningham (Balcatta)
2002	Sarah Cunningham (Balcatta)
2001	
2000	
1999	
1998	
1997	

Season	Winner
1996	Sherri Pirikahu (Mandurah)
1995	Liz Dielesen (Kingsley)
1994	Liz Dielesen (Kingsley)
1993	Bridget Silva (Fremantle Benfica)
1992	
1991	Tracey Wheeler (Morley Windmills)
1990	Jamine Taylor (Fremantle United)
1989	Lisa Miles (Bayswater); Sandra Brentnall (Ashfield Dynamo)
1988	Joanne Rooney (Ashfield Dynamo); Julie Gorton (Ascot-Ferndale)
1987	Judy Pettitt (Ascot-Ferndale)
1986	Lisa Miles (Kingsway Olympic)
1985	Michelle Matthews (Inglewood Kiev Eagles)
1984	Judy Esmond (Melville Alemannia)
1983	Sandra Brentnall (Kingsway Olympic)
1982	Sandra Brentnall (Kingsway Olympic)
1981	Sandra Brentnall (Inglewood Kiev Eagles)
1980	Lynda Woodfin (Queens Park)
1979	Sandra Brentnall (Kingsway Olympic)
1978	Sandra Brentnall (Kingsway Olympic)
1977	Pauline Rakich (Swan Athletic)
1976	Barbara Kozak/Nicholson (Stirling Cracovia)
1975	Heather Dunbnar (Queens Park)
1974	Lynda Mateljan (Azzurri)
1973	Julie Clayton (East Fremantle Tricolore)
1972	Sharon Loveless (Azzurri)

=== Top Goalscorer (Golden Boot) ===
Season	Winner
2025	Renee Leota (Perth Redstar)
2024	Ella Lincoln (Perth SC)
2023	Tia Stonehill (Balcatta Etna)
2022	Larissa Walsh (Perth Redstar)
2021	Larissa Walsh (Northern Redbacks); Tia Stonehill (Murdoch University Melville)
2020	Katarina Jukic (Murdoch University Melville)
2019	Sarah Carroll (Northern Redbacks)
2018	Katarina Jukic (Queens Park)
2017	Katarina Jukic (Queens Park)
2016	Marianna Tabain (Beckenham Angels)
2015	Katarina Jukic (Beckenham Angels)
2014	Brooke Johnston (Queens Park)
2013	Renee Leota (Northern Redbacks)
2012	Lindsay Jobling (Beckenham Angels)
2011	Andrea Prieato (Beckenham Angels)
2010	Caitlin Dingle (Balcatta)
2009	Lara Filocamo (Northern Redbacks); Jackie Nellany (Northern Redbcacks)
2008	Stacey Woodfin (Queens Park)
2007	Stacey Woodfin (Queens Park)
2006	Elisa D'Ovidio (Balcatta)
2005	Stacey Woodfin (Queens Park)
2004	Lisa DeVanna (Northern Redbacks)
2003	Lisa DeVanna (Northern Redbacks)
2002	
2001	
2000	
1999	
1998	
1997	

Season	Winner
1996	Michelle Matthews (Stirling Reds)
1995	Nicole Green (Stirling Reds)
1994	
1993	
1992	
1991	
1990	Sandra Brentnall (Ashfield Dynamo)
1989	
1988	Penny Tanner (Curtin University)
1987	Tina Harding (Melville Alemannia)
1986	Tina Harding (Melville Alemannia)
1985	Tina Harding (Melville Alemannia)
1984	Tina Harding (Kelmscott)
1983	Barbara Nicholson (Stirling Cracovia)
1982	Sandra Brentnall (Kingsway Olympic)
1981	Sandra Brentnall (Inglewood Kiev Eagles)
1980	Sandra Brentnall (Inglewood Kiev)
1979	Sandra Brentnall (Kingsway Olympic)
1978	Sharon Loveless (Kingsway Olympic); Sandra Brentnall (Kingway Olympic)
1977	Heather Dunbar (Osborne Park Galeb)
1976	Lynda Mateljan (Osborne Park Galeb)
1975	
1974	
1973	
1972	

=== Goalkeeper of the Year ===
Season	Winner
2025	Dayle Schroeder (Perth SC)
2024	Rebecca Bennett (Balcatta Etna)
2023	Rebecca Bennett (Perth SC)
2022	Rebecca Bennett (Perth SC)
2021	Marissa Pidgeon (Subiaco)
2020	Gabby Dal Busco (Balcatta); Miranda Templeman (Football West NTC)
2019	Morgan Aquino (Northern Redbacks)
2018	Morgan Aquino (Northern Redbacks)
2017	Maya Diederichsen (Queens Park)
2016	Evie Gooch (Melville City)
2015	Gabby Dal Busco (Football West NTC)
2014	Gabby Dal Busco (Football West NTC)
2013	Maya Diederichsen (Queens Park)
2012	
2011	Kristy Teschinsky (Beckenham Angels)
2010	
2009	Maya Diederichsen (Queens Park)
2008	Sara King (Mandurah City)
2007	Sara King (Mandurah City)
2006	
2005	
2004	
2003	
2002	
2001	
2000	
1999	
1998	
1997	

Season	Winner
1996	Julie Holmes (Joondalup)
1995	
1994	
1993	
1992	
1991	
1990	Kerry Smith (Morley Windmills)
1989	Mandy Laing (University)
1988	Yvette Burrows (Connell United)
1987	Mandy Laing (University)
1986	Mandy Laing (University)
1985	Katrina Robinson (Kingsway Olympic)
1984	Katrina Robinson (Kingsway Olympic)
1983	Denise Lofthouse (Kelmscott)
1982	Michelle Roach (Girrawheen)
1981	Sue Ravine (University)
1980	Sue Ravine (University)
1979	Jenny Hollingbury (Breakaways)
1978	
1977	Maxine Sullivan (Queens Park)
1976	Maxine Sullivan (Inglewood Kiev)
1975	Maxine Sullivan (Queens Park)
1974	
1973	
1972	

== See also ==
- National Premier Leagues Western Australia
