= Sally James (soccer) =

Australian soccer player (born 2022)

Personal information
- Full name: Sally Kathleen James
- Date of birth: 18 October 2002 (age 24)
- Height: 1.77 m (5 ft 10 in)
- Position: Goalkeeper

Team information
- Current team: Canberra United
- Number: 1

Senior career*
Years	Team	Apps	(Gls)
2018	Canberra United Academy		
2019	Belconnen United		
2020	Illawarra Stingrays		
2020–2021	Canberra United	3	(0)
2021	Blacktown Spartans		
2021–2022	Melbourne City	4	(0)
2022	Blacktown Spartans	9	(0)
2022–2023	Melbourne City	12	(0)
2023	Blacktown Spartans	9	(0)
2023–2024	Perth Glory	2	(0)
2024–2025	APIA Leichhardt		
2024–	Canberra United	24	(0)

International career^{‡}
2022–2024	Australia U20	3	(0)
2025	Australia U23	1	(0)
- * Club domestic league appearances and goals as of 31 October 2025 ‡ National team caps and goals as of 20 August 2025

Sally Kathleen James (born 18 October 2002) is an Australian soccer player who plays as a goalkeeper for A-League Women club Canberra United. She has represented Australia internationally on both the under-20 and under-23 national teams.

== Early life ==
Sally James was born in Canberra in 2002. From the age of five, she played soccer for Majura Junior Soccer Club in Dickson. Initially playing as a striker, she recalled switching to goalkeeper, "I chucked on the gloves one night for fun, it was raining, I was diving around in the mud, but never looked back."

== Club career ==
James began her club career in 2018 competing for Canberra United Academy. She played for Belconnen United (2019) before joining various National Premier Leagues NSW Women's (NPL NSW Women's) teams Illawarra Stingrays (2020), Blacktown Spartans (2021–2023) and APIA Leichhardt (2024–2025). She made her debut for A-League Women's national level team Canberra United seniors from December 2020 for the 2020–21 season.

James spent two seasons at Melbourne City (2021–22, 2022–23) for 16 appearances and one season at Perth Glory (2023–24, two appearances) before returning to Canberra United for 2024–25. Over her 24 appearances in that season she kept five clean sheets.

== International career ==
James was a member of Australia women's national under-20 soccer team (Young Matildas), who played in all three of their group stage matches at the 2022 FIFA U-20 Women's World Cup in Costa Rica. Australia did not qualify for the knock-out stage. She joined the Australia U23 for the 2025 ASEAN Women's Championship, held in Vietnam in August. During the first group stage match, James kept goals in her team's 1–2 loss against Myanmar. However, Australia U23 improved their performances in the other group matches to reach the semi-final and subsequently won the championship final 1–0 against Myanmar.

In 2025, James was added to the senior team's extended squad for two friendlies against South Korea in Sydney and Newcastle, following an injury to Mackenzie Arnold. She is still yet to debut for the senior team, however.
