= Emma Tovar =

American footballer

Personal information
- Full name: Emma Rose Valenzuela Tovar
- Date of birth: 4 December 2003 (age 22)
- Place of birth: San Jose, California, United States
- Height: 1.70 m (5 ft 7 in)
- Positions: Midfielder; defender

Team information
- Current team: Perth Glory
- Number: 6

Youth career
- 2018–2021: California Thorns FC
- 2022–2025: Valencia

Senior career*
Years	Team	Apps	(Gls)
2021–2025	Valencia B	70	(7)
2022–2025	Valencia	8	(0)
2025–	Perth Glory	19	(1)
- * Club domestic league appearances and goals as of 7 September 2026

Emma Rose Valenzuela Tovar (Spanish: [toˈβaɾ]; born 4 December 2003) is a professional footballer who plays as a midfielder or a defender for A-League Women club Perth Glory.

Tovar is a Filipino American.

== Club career ==
Tovar started her career in California Thorns FC's youth system. In 2021–22 season, she moved to Spain and joined the reserve team of Valencia CF Femenino.

On 2 March 2022, Tovar made her debut for Valencia in a 3–0 defeat against Granadilla Tenerife in the Copa de la Reina round of 16, coming in as a substitute, replacing Júlia Aguado in the 75th minute. A few weeks later, she made her league debut in a 3–0 away defeat against Atlético Madrid Femenino, coming in as a substitute, replacing Marta Carro in the 70th minute.

In August 2024, Tovar renewed her contract with Valencia.

On 17 September 2025, Australian club Perth Glory announced the signing of Tovar.

== International career ==
Tovar was invited to the Philippines national team training camp in February 2025.
