= Gladesville Ravens =

- Full name: Gladesville Ravens Sports Club Inc
- Nickname: The Ravens
- Founded: 1960; 66 years ago
- Ground: Christie Park, Macquarie Park
- Owner: A Board operated not for profit organisation
- Head Coach: Guillermo Rubio
- League: NSW NPLW1
- Website: http://www.gladesvilleravens.com.au/

Gladesville Ravens are an association football team based in Gladesville. They compete in the NSW National Premier Leagues Women's or highest state level tier of women's soccer within Football NSW. The club was founded in 1960 and is an operated as a registered not for profit organisation.

== Foundation ==
In 1960 a Social Club was founded to support football (soccer) activities managed by Christ Church Gladesville, and in 1961 entered the Gladesville-Hornsby Association competitions. In 1964 teams were formed for entry into the Sydney Suburban Amateur Division, a competition for senior players which drew clubs from across the metropolitan area. The 1980s began with a change of name to match this gradual change in the nature of the club, and so Gladesville Ravens Sports Club was announced. In 1981 football for women and girls was announced, and Ravens was a foundation club in the new Gladesville-Hornsby Women's Soccer Association (now North West Sydney Football). In 1988 numbers and proficiency had grown to such a degree that entry into Women's State Leagues was sought, where participation continues to the present day.

== Colours and badge ==
Gladesville Ravens play in black and white stripes, black shorts and black socks. Their away kit is all royal blue.

== Honours ==
- 2019 FNSW NPL 2 Champions
- 2022 FNSW League One Women's Champions
- 2022 FNSW League One Women's Premiers
- 2025 FNSW NPL Women's NSW U23 Premiers.
