= Onyinyechi Zogg =

Swiss–Nigerian footballer (born 1997)

Personal information
- Full name: Onyinyechi Salome Zogg
- Date of birth: 3 March 1997 (age 29)
- Place of birth: Bern, Switzerland
- Height: 1.72 m (5 ft 8 in)
- Position: Defender

Team information
- Current team: Perth Glory
- Number: 29

Youth career
- 2008–2011: FC Bethlehem
- 2011–2012: Femina Kickers Worb

College career
Years	Team	Apps	(Gls)
2017	Monroe Mustangs	10	(0)

Senior career*
Years	Team	Apps	(Gls)
2013–2017	Femina Kickers Worb		
2018–2019	Young Boys	16	(1)
2019–2021	Zürich	35	(4)
2021–2022	ASJ Soyaux	11	(0)
2022–2023	Turbine Potsdam	3	(0)
2024	Servette	4	(0)
2024–	Perth Glory	20	(0)

International career^{‡}
2021–	Nigeria	2	(0)
- * Club domestic league appearances and goals as of 6 April 2025 ‡ National team caps and goals as of 16 June 2021.

Onyinyechi Salome Zogg (Igbo: [ɔ̀.njī.njɛ̀.t͡ʃí sà.ló.mé]; born 3 March 1997) is a footballer who plays as a defender for Perth Glory in the A-League Women. She has previously played for Swiss clubs Young Boys, Femina Kickers Worb, Bethlehem, Zürich, and Servette, French club Soyaux, and German club Turbine Potsdam. Born in Switzerland, she represents Nigeria at international level.

== College career ==
Zogg played for Monroe Mustangs while attending Monroe College in the United States. She ended up playing 10 games, starting all of them, during the 2017 year. Despite benefiting from the physical strength of the league and taking on increasing responsibility, she left America after one season due to homesickness.

== Club career ==
When she was 11, Zogg accompanied a friend to football practice and ended up participating and falling in love with the game. After a year of training in both athletics and football, she decided to focus on football due to the team spirit.

Zogg played for three years as a striker at FC Bethlehem, before joining the under-16 team of Femina Kickers Worb. There she played for one year as a striker, before moving to the centre back position due to several defenders being sidelined with injury. At the age of 16, Zogg was promoted to the club's senior squad in the Nationalliga B, and in 2017, they just missed out on promotion to the Nationalliga A.

In the summer of 2018, after returning from the United States, Zogg joined BSC Young Boys.

In August 2021, Zogg joined French club Soyaux.

In January 2022, Zogg joined German club Turbine Potsdam. In May 2023, she departed the club, thanking them for great moments and outstanding support.

In January 2024, Zogg returned to Switzerland, signing with Servette.

In August 2024, Zogg joined Australian club Perth Glory. She wanted to experience the quality and level of the A-League Women. She was named co-captain along with Isobel Dalton on 15 October 2024. She impressed for the club, earning the Player of the Match award in January 2025, despite the team losing 2–0 to Wellington Phoenix.

== International career ==
In June 2021, Zogg was called-up by Nigeria due to her dual-heritage, alongside Roosa Ariyo for a friendly against Jamaica at BBVA Stadium in Houston. She made her senior debut for Nigeria in the match which ended in a 1–0 loss.

In May 2024, photos of Zogg wearing the Spain national team kit prompted speculations that she applied to switch allegiance. However, she confirmed that she wasn't and it was just part of modelling work she did for Adidas.

== Style of play ==
Zogg is a technically skilled and physically capable defender.

== Personal life ==
Zogg was born and raised in Bern. Her father is Nigerian and her mother is Swiss.At the age of six, Zogg started competing in athletics, including high jump, hurdling, and the 60-metre sprint.
