= Isabella Wallhead =

Australian soccer player

Personal information
- Full name: Isabella Rose Wallhead
- Date of birth: 15 February 2003 (age 23)
- Place of birth: Attadale, Australia
- Position: Defender

Team information
- Current team: South Melbourne

Senior career*
Years	Team	Apps	(Gls)
2019–2025	Perth Glory	15	(0)
2022–2023	→ Heidelberg United (loan)	24	(1)
2025–2026	Heidelberg United		
2026–	South Melbourne		

International career
2018–2019	Australia U17		
2022–	Australia U20		
- * Club domestic league appearances and goals as of 28 May 2024

Isabella Wallhead (born 15 February 2003) is an Australian soccer player who plays for South Melbourne.

== Playing career ==
Wallhead grew up in Perth and attended Seton Catholic College. Wallhead played youth football at Cockburn City.

In 2018, Wallhead was selected for the Australian under-17 national team. She played at the 2019 AFC under 16 Women's Championship in Thailand, where she was one of 5 West Australians in the squad and scored 2 goals in the qualifying match against Palestine in an 11–0 victory. Australia lost in the semi-finals and failed to qualify for the world cup.

Wallhead was selected for the Perth Glory squad for the 2019–20 W-League season, and made her debut against Adelaide United on 3 January 2020, replacing Natasha Rigby for the second half. In December 2020, Wallhead re-signed with Perth Glory ahead of the 2020–21 W-League season. In June 2021, Wallhead re-signed with Perth Glory once more, ahead of the 2021–22 W-League season.

In April 2022, Wallhead joined NPL Victoria club Heidelberg United following the conclusion of the A-League Women season. In June 2022, she signed a contract extension with Perth Glory.

In June 2026, Wallhead joined Heidelberg United.

In November 2022, Wallhead joined the Australia under-20 training camp ahead of the 2022 FIFA U-20 Women's World Cup.
