= Gabby Hollar =

American soccer player (born 2000)

Personal information
- Full name: Gabriella Hollar
- Date of birth: June 24, 2000 (age 26)
- Place of birth: West Liberty, Ohio, US
- Height: 1.77 m (5 ft 10 in)
- Position: Forward

College career
Years	Team	Apps	(Gls)
2019	West Virginia Mountaineers	10	(1)
2020–2022	Purdue Boilermakers	42	(2)
2023	South Alabama Jaguars	20	(12)

Senior career*
Years	Team	Apps	(Gls)
2024	Boroondara-Carey Eagles FC	19	(18)
2024–2026	Perth Glory FC	17	(5)
- * Club domestic league appearances and goals as of November 22, 2025

Gabriella Hollar (born June 24, 2000) is an American professional soccer player who last played as a forward for Perth Glory FC.

== Early life ==
Hollar was born on June 24, 2000, in the West Liberty, Ohio. The daughter of Aaron and Kim, she is the older sister of Emily Hollar.

Growing up, she attended West Virginia University in the United States. Following her stint there, she attended Purdue University in the United States. Afterwards, she attended the University of South Alabama in the United States.

== Career ==
In 2024, Hollar signed for Australian side Boroondara-Carey Eagles FC, where she made nineteen league appearances and scored eighteen goals. Ahead of the 2024–25 season, she signed for Australian side Perth Glory FC, where she suffered a blood clot.

In June 2026, Hollar departed Perth Glory at the conclusion of her contract, after scoring six goals in 29 appearances.
