= Isabella Foletta =

Australian association football player

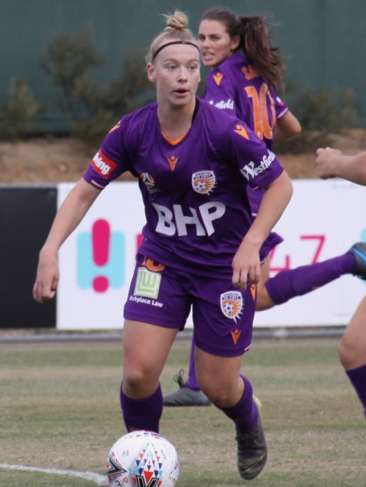

Personal information
- Date of birth: 9 March 2000 (age 26)
- Position: Defender

Isabella Foletta (Italian: [izaˈbɛlla foˈletta]; 9 March 2000) is an Australian rules footballer, currently playing for East Perth in the WAFLW. She was previously a soccer player, most recently as a defender playing for Perth Glory. She has previously played for Brisbane Roar and the Serie A team Lazio in Italy.
