= Isobel Dalton =

Australian soccer player (born 1997)

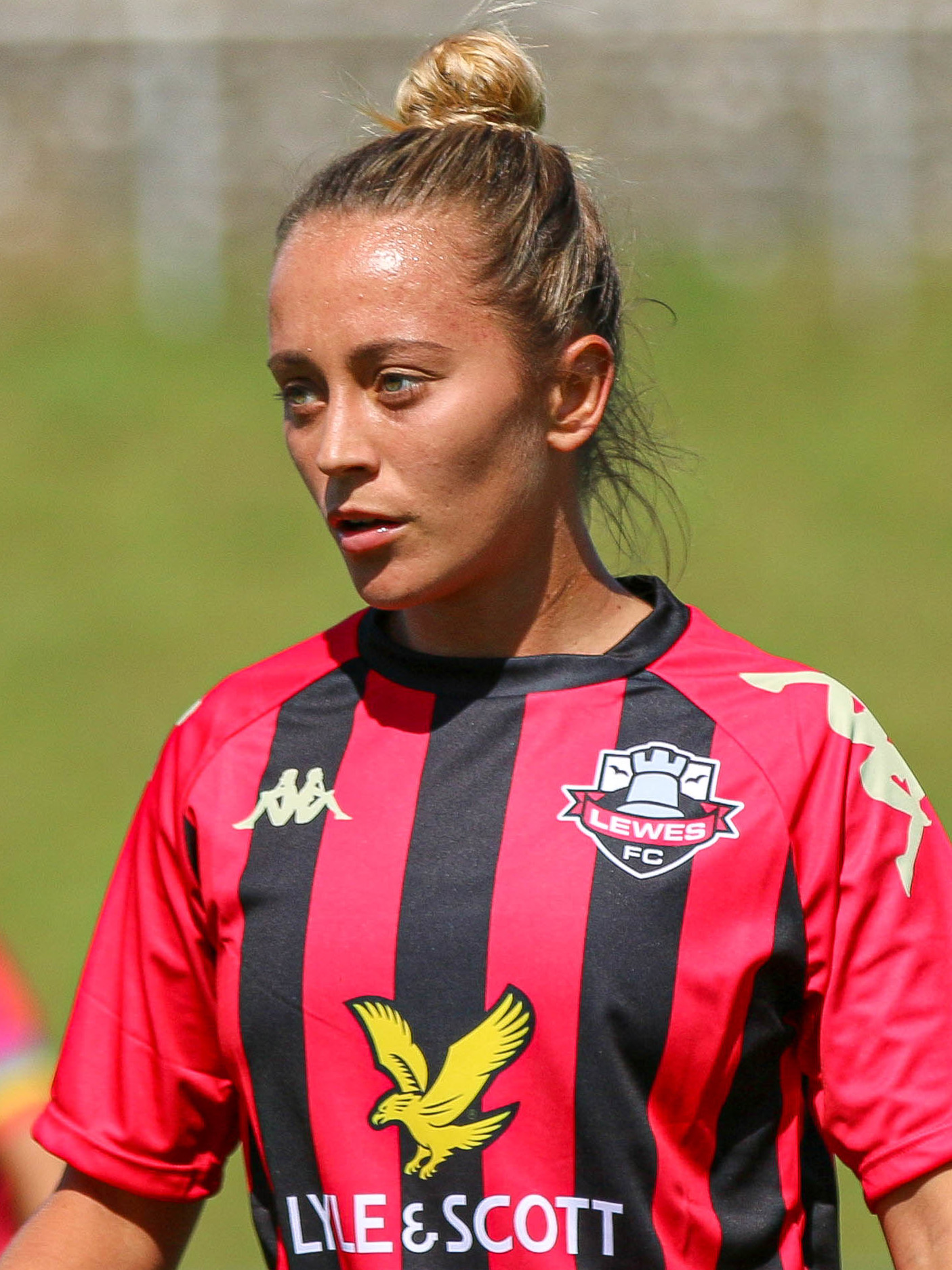

Personal information
- Full name: Isobel Dalton
- Date of birth: 9 September 1997 (age 29)
- Place of birth: Barnsley, England
- Height: 1.65 m (5 ft 5 in)
- Position: Midfielder

Team information
- Current team: Perth Glory
- Number: 23

College career
Years	Team	Apps	(Gls)
2015	Lindsey Wilson College	23	(7)
2016-2019	Buffaloes	26	(0)

Senior career*
Years	Team	Apps	(Gls)
2014	Brisbane Roar	1	(0)
2014-2015	Bristol City	1	(0)
2019	Nottingham Forest	15	(1)
2019	Brisbane Roar	12	(0)
2019–2020	Napoli	4	(0)
2020	Brisbane Roar	12	(0)
2021–2023	Lewes	41	(3)
2023–	Perth Glory	55	(4)

International career^{‡}
2012	Australia U-17	8	(1)
- * Club domestic league appearances and goals as of 14 December 2023 (UTC) ‡ National team caps and goals as of 26 October 2021

Isobel "Izzy" Dalton (/ˈdɒltən/; born 9 September 1997) is an Australian soccer player, who plays for Perth Glory in the Australian A-League Women competition. She has represented Australia in the Australia women's national under-17 soccer team.

She is also currently serving as Director of Women's Football at Balga SC.

== Playing career ==
=== Bristol Academy ===
Izzy began her professional career at Bristol Academy (now Bristol City) during the 2014/15 season. Dalton made her FA WSL debut against Arsenal under manager Willie Kirk.

=== Brisbane Roar ===
Dalton has had three stints at Brisbane Roar during the 2014–15, 2019–20 and 2020–21 seasons. Making her debut on 8 November 2014, in a 3–0 win over Adelaide United, since her debut she has made 24 more appearances for the side. Dalton recently topped the league with the most assists in the 2020/21 season with a total 7, while the team went on to finish 2nd in the regular season. She also won Brisbane Roar Player of the Year in the same season.

=== University of Colorado, Boulder ===
After spending 2015 at Lindsay Wilson College in Kentucky, scoring 7 times with 3 assists, Dalton switched to the University of Colorado Boulder to play for the Colorado Buffaloes, being awarded an honorable mention in the 2018 Pac-12 All-Academic team. Dalton graduated from the University of Colorado with a Bachelor of Science in sociology in May 2019.

=== Nottingham Forest ===
Following her graduation in 2019, Dalton had a brief spell at Nottingham Forest. However by November, she chose to leave the club, having been offered a professional contract with Brisbane Roar.

=== Napoli Femminile ===
In the 2020–21 season Dalton made the move to Italian giants Napoli, playing in the Serie A. She was soon joined by fellow Australians Alexandra Huynh and Jacynta Galabadaarachchi.

=== Lewes FC Women ===
Dalton joined the 'Equality FC' based club in the summer of 2021 off the back of an award-winning season spent with Brisbane Roar. Dalton appeared 36 times for the club, scoring 3 goals, and appeared in the FA Cup Quarter-Final clash against Manchester United, in March 2023. Dalton departed the club in the summer of 2023 to pursue new opportunities.

=== Perth Glory ===
In June 2023, it was announced that Dalton signed for Australian club Perth Glory on a two-year contract.

At the conclusion of the 2023–24 season, Dalton was awarded Perth Glory A-League Women's Goal of the Season, for her injury time equaliser against Canberra United in a match that ended 2–2.

Dalton was named co-captain on 15 October 2024 along with Onyinyechi Zogg.

Dalton took out the Most Glorious Player Award off the back of the 24/25 season
