= Football West =

Governing body for soccer in Western Australia

- Formation: 2004
- Headquarters: Sam Kerr Football Centre, Queens Park
- Location: Perth
- Region served: Western Australia, Australia
- CEO: Jamie Harnwell
- Affiliations: Football Australia
- Website: footballwest.com.au

Football West is the state governing body for soccer in Western Australia (WA). It is affiliated with Football Australia (FA), the sport's national governing body, and through FA's affiliation to FIFA. Football West's premier competition is the National Premier Leagues Western Australia (NPL WA), which is the highest league in WA and one tier below the national A-League. NPL WA is a division within the National Premier Leagues. Football West is also responsible for running Western Australia's National Training Centre in conjunction with FA and the WA Government's Department of Local Government, Sport and Cultural Industries (DLGSC). Football West also runs the Football West State Cup knock-out cup. Since 2014 the two State Cup finalists also qualify for the Australia Cup.

== History ==
The Western Australian Soccer Association was established in July 2004 to represent the game of soccer at all levels of competition, in the Perth metropolitan area and regional Western Australia. The body was formed following a period of national and state review and reform, that was led by Federal and State Governments and facilitated by the Department of Sport and Recreation WA, with the objective of creating a unified State soccer body representative. The association changed its name to Football West in early 2005.

In 2014 Football West invested more than $45,000 in subsidising coaching courses to promote coach education programs in the NPL.

The number of registered participants in Western Australia in the 2016 season was over 44,000.

In June 2024, Football West signed an agreement with Futsal WA, an affiliation which brings all registered Futsal players in the state under one banner.

== Administration ==
The current board members (directors) of Football West are Chris Harold (chair), Ivy Chen (deputy chair), Richard Marshall, Annette Ellis, David Buckingham, Jade Concei, and Nadia van Dommelen. The current chief executive officer (CEO) is Jamie Harnwell, who took over the role in April 2022.

== Objectives ==
In 2015, the listed objectives of Football West were to:

- Develop strong customer focus and a service delivery ethos
- Ensure structural and philosophical alignment with all stakeholders
- Deliver financial and organisation sustainability through effective corporate governance
- Be passionate about improving soccer

== Sam Kerr Football Centre ==
Sam Kerr Football Centre
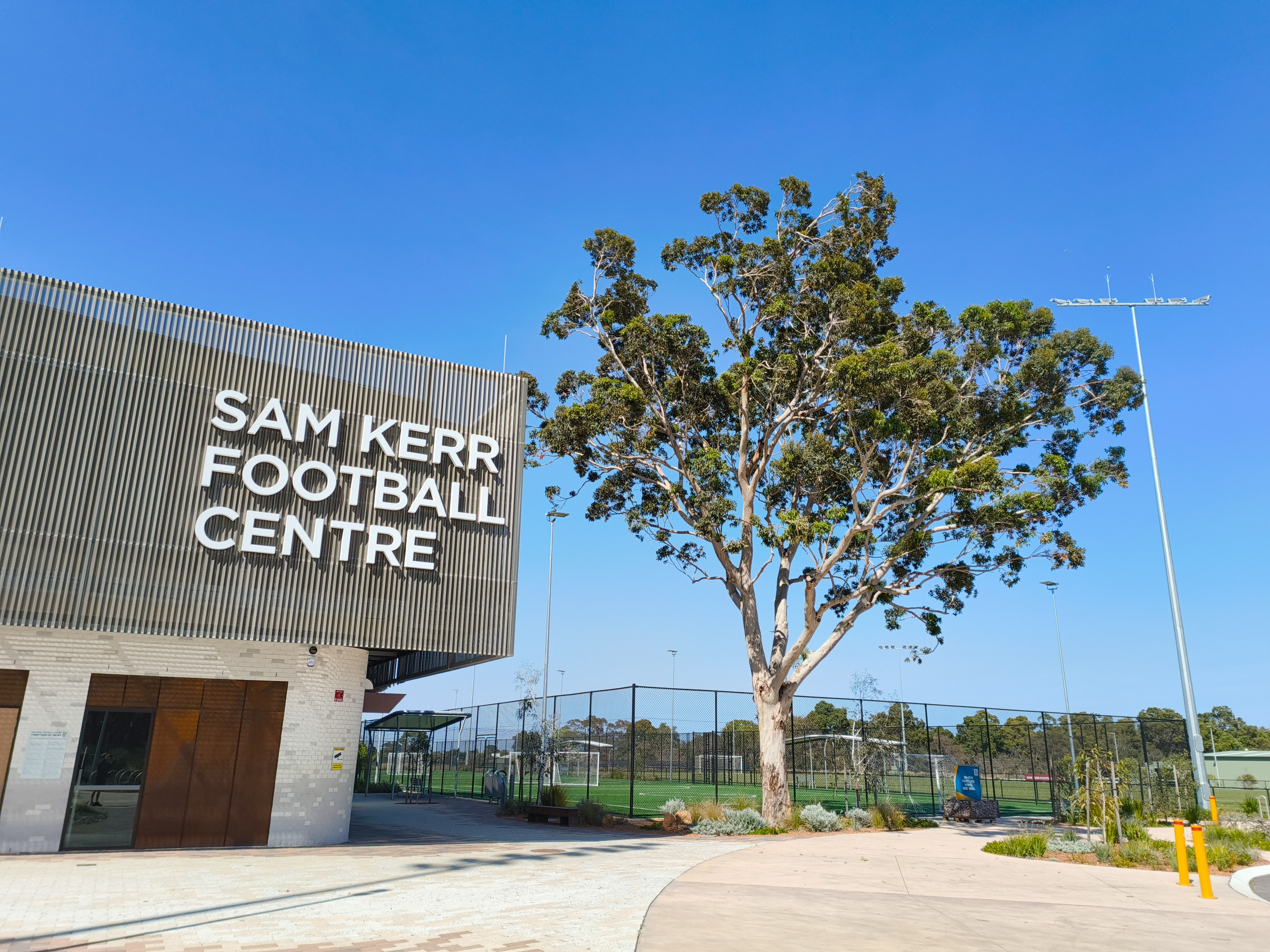
- Location: 305 Welshpool Road, Queens Park
- Coordinates: 31.99985°S 115.95936°E
- Owner: VenuesWest
- Operator: Football West; VenuesWest
- Capacity: 700 (grandstand); 2,500 (ground)
- Surface: Grass
- Scoreboard: LED

Construction
- Groundbreaking: February 2022
- Opened: 27 October 2023
- Architect: Caribiner

Tenants
- Perth Glory FC (NPL WA) (since 2024); Perth Glory Women (since 2024); Socceroos (training base); Matildas (training base)

The Sam Kerr Football Centre is a soccer facility serving as the headquarters for Football West. It is named after Western Australian-born Sam Kerr, honouring her soccer success and her contribution to professional and grassroots soccer.

In May 2019, Liberal-National Coalition Prime Minister Scott Morrison pledged $16.25 million towards a State Football Centre at Maniana Reserve, Queens Park, Cannington. This figure was matched by Labor's WA Premier Mark McGowan in 2020, which meant construction of the State Football Centre could go ahead. It was completed in mid-2023, in time for the 2023 FIFA Women's World Cup. The centre was officially opened in October 2023 and was named the Sam Kerr Football Centre.

The centre features two full size grass playing pitches and three five-a-side synthetic playing pitches on a 16-hectare (40-acre) site, along with function, office and meeting spaces. The main competition pitch has a two-storey grandstand with seats for 700 spectators, with the capability of hosting up to 4,000 with additional temporary seating.

The facility was used as the training base of the Denmark, Canada, Panama, Haiti and Morocco national teams at the 2023 FIFA Women's World Cup.

In June 2024, the Socceroos used the facility as a training base ahead of their 2026 World Cup Qualifier against Palestine, which was played in Perth. It continues to be used by both the men's and women's national teams prior to games played in WA.

The Perth Glory Youth team has been using the centre as its home ground since 2024, and it will be the home ground for the Perth Glory Women's team starting from the 2024–25 season. The centre also hosted the 2024 Australia Cup round of 32 match between Perth Glory and Melbourne City, and was originally scheduled to host the 2025 Australia Cup round of 32 match between Perth and Wellington Phoenix, however the venue was changed prior to the game.

== Regional associations ==
- Albany Junior Soccer Association
- Great Southern Soccer Association
- Broome Soccer Association
- Carnarvon Junior Soccer Association
- Carnarvon Senior Soccer Association
- Esperance Soccer Association
- Football Federation South West
  - Collie Soccer Association
  - Country Coastal Junior Soccer Association
  - Leeuwin Naturaliste Junior Soccer Association
  - Lower South West Soccer League
  - South West Soccer Association
- Geraldton Junior Soccer Association
- Goldfields Soccer Association
- Hedland Junior Soccer Association
- Karratha and Districts Junior Soccer Association
- Karratha and Districts Soccer Association
- Midwest Soccer Association
- Newman Junior Soccer Association
- Northam Springfield FC
- Peel Junior Soccer Association
- Peel Regional Football Council
- Shire of Mount Magnet
- Tom Price Junior Soccer Association
- Toodyay Soccer Club
