= A-League Women transfers for 2026–27 season =

This is a list of Australian soccer transfers for the 2026–27 A-League Women. Only moves featuring at least one A-League Women club are listed.

== Transfers ==
All players without a flag are Australian. Clubs without a flag are clubs participating in the A-League Women.

=== Pre-season ===
Date	Name	Moving from	Moving to
19 February 2026	(New Zealand) Harriet Muller	Wellington Phoenix	(United States) Incarnate Word Cardinals
17 March 2026	(United States) Blake Hughes	Central Coast Mariners	(United States) Texas A&M Aggies
4 April 2026	(United States) Jodi Ülkekul	Sydney FC	Retired
15 April 2026	Hana Lowry	Sydney FC	(Norway) Vålerenga
28 April 2026	Tori Tumeth	Sydney FC	(Canada) Vancouver Rise
20 May 2026	Rachel Lowe	Melbourne Victory	(England) Durham
20 May 2026	Natalie Picak	Melbourne Victory	TBA
20 May 2026	(United States) Kennedy White	Melbourne Victory	(United States) Tampa Bay Sun
20 May 2026	(United States) Payton Woodward	Melbourne Victory	TBA
22 May 2026	Kyla Hanson	Brisbane Roar	(Australia) Eastern Suburbs
22 May 2026	(Netherlands) Bente Jansen	Brisbane Roar	(Netherlands) De Graafschap
22 May 2026	Ava Piazza	Brisbane Roar	Unattached
26 May 2026	(New Zealand) Grace Bartlett	Wellington Phoenix	(New Zealand) Auckland United
28 May 2026	Katie Bowler	Adelaide United	Unattached
4 June 2026	Ischia Brooking	Perth Glory	Unattached
4 June 2026	Naomi Chinnama	Perth Glory	Unattached
4 June 2026	(United States) Gabby Hollar	Perth Glory	Unattached
4 June 2026	Tanika Lala	Perth Glory	Unattached
4 June 2026	Sarah O'Donoghue	Perth Glory	Unattached
15 June 2026	Mackenzie Hawkesby	Sydney FC	Unattached
16 June 2026	(United States) Heather Hinz	Sydney FC	(United States) Fort Lauderdale United
23 June 2026	Isabel Gomez	Central Coast Mariners	(Sweden) Rosengård
24 June 2026	(New Zealand) Ela Jerez	Wellington Phoenix	(New Zealand) Wellington United
24 June 2026	(Dominican Republic) Lucía León	Wellington Phoenix	Unattached
24 June 2026	(New Zealand) Ella McMillan	Wellington Phoenix	(New Zealand) Waterside Karori
24 June 2026	(Netherlands) Tessel Middag	Wellington Phoenix	Unattached
24 June 2026	(New Zealand) Emma Pijnenburg	Wellington Phoenix	(Netherlands) Hera United
24 June 2026	Amy Barker	Western Sydney Wanderers	(Japan) Cerezo Osaka
25 June 2026	Alexia Apostolakis	Melbourne City	(England) Bristol City
25 June 2026	Bryleeh Henry	Melbourne City	(Sweden) Rosengård
30 June 2026	Holly McNamara	Melbourne City	(England) Everton
30 June 2026	Gracen Blieschke	Adelaide United	(United States) Southern Utah Thunderbirds
2 July 2026	(Republic of Ireland) Erin Healy	Adelaide United	(Italy) Parma
2 July 2026	Matilda McNamara	Adelaide United	(Portugal) Racing Power
2 July 2026	Ella Tonkin	Adelaide United	(Portugal) Torreense
13 July 2026	(Wales) Laura Hughes	Melbourne City	(England) Southampton
13 July 2026	(United States) Emma Hawkins	Canberra United	(Iceland) Valur
17 July 2026	Tijan McKenna	Perth Glory	(Norway) Vålerenga
18 July 2026	Grace Johnston	Perth Glory	(England) Charlton Athletic
22 July 2026	(United States) Kam Pickett	(Iceland) Fram Reykjavik	Wellington Phoenix
23 July 2026	Dylan Holmes	Adelaide United	Unattached
23 July 2026	(England) Millie Farrow	Central Coast Mariners	(Turkey) Trabzonspor
24 July 2026	Cushla Rue	Western Sydney Wanderers	Unattached
24 July 2026	(Philippines) Janae DeFazio	Western Sydney Wanderers	Unattached
24 July 2026	(Japan) Ena Harada	Western Sydney Wanderers	Unattached
24 July 2026	(Portugal) Siena Arrarte	Western Sydney Wanderers	Unattached
24 July 2026	(China) Yuan Cong	Western Sydney Wanderers	Unattached
24 July 2026	Anika Stajcic	Western Sydney Wanderers	Unattached
24 July 2026	(South Korea) Kim So-eun	Western Sydney Wanderers	Unattached
24 July 2026	Amy Chessari	Western Sydney Wanderers	Sydney FC (Note: Player signed a two-year contract.)
24 July 2026	Claudia Cicco	Newcastle Jets	Adelaide United
24 July 2026	Leah Davidson	Melbourne City	(England) Charlton Athletic
25 July 2026	(Panama) Riley Tanner	Sydney FC	Unattached
25 July 2026	Claudia Valletta	Sydney FC	Unattached
25 July 2026	(United States) Taylor Otto	Melbourne City	(Canada) Calgary Wild
27 July 2026	(United States) Marianna Seidl	Brisbane Roar	(Spain) Eibar
31 July 2026	(United States) Ashlyn Miller	Brisbane Roar	(United States) Brooklyn FC
4 August 2026	(New Zealand) Maggie Jenkins	(Australia) Essendon Royals	Perth Glory
4 August 2026	(Lebanon) Tiana Jaber	Wellington Phoenix	Western Sydney Wanderers
5 August 2026	Haley Johnson	Newcastle Jets	Unattached
5 August 2026	(New Zealand) Anna Leat	Newcastle Jets	Unattached
5 August 2026	(New Zealand) Olivia Page	Newcastle Jets	Unattached
6 August 2026	(New Zealand) Abby Erceg	(Mexico) Toluca	Wellington Phoenix
6 August 2026 (Note: Player was released to free agency before joining new club)	Ella Buchanan	Western Sydney Wanderers	Perth Glory
6 August 2026	Tegan Bertolissio	Canberra United	Western Sydney Wanderers
7 August 2026	Sham Khamis	Western Sydney Wanderers	Unattached
10 August 2026	(United States) Mackenzie Anthony	Wellington Phoenix	Unattached
10 August 2026	(New Zealand) Daisy Brazendale	Wellington Phoenix	Unattached
10 August 2026	(New Zealand) Lara Wall	Wellington Phoenix	Unattached
11 August 2026	Cortnee Vine	Unattached	Melbourne City
11 August 2026	Tameka Yallop	Brisbane Roar	Wellington Phoenix
12 August 2026	(New Zealand) Macey Fraser	Wellington Phoenix	Unattached
13 August 2026	(United States) Faith Webber	(United States) Denver Summit	Sydney FC
13 August 2026	(Germany) Samantha Iredale	Unattached	Western Sydney Wanderers
14 August 2026	Melina Ayres	Newcastle Jets	Melbourne City
15 August 2026	(United States) Josie Aulicino	Canberra United	(Canada) Calgary Wild
19 August 2026	Avaani Prakash	Central Coast Mariners	Melbourne City
19 August 2026	(Nigeria) Chinaza Uchendu	Melbourne City	Unattached
20 August 2026	Aimee Medwin	Brisbane Roar	Melbourne City
21 August 2026	Taylor Ray	Melbourne Victory	Melbourne City
21 August 2026	(Panama) Riley Cohn	Unattached	Sydney FC
22 August 2026	Sophie Hoban	Newcastle Jets	(Portugal) Torreense
22 August 2026	(United States) Brooke Miller	Unattached	Western Sydney Wanderers
23 August 2026	(Serbia) Mary Stanić-Floody	Canberra United	(Scotland) Motherwell
24 August 2026	Jada Whyman	Unattached	Sydney FC
24 August 2026	Alana Cerne	Western Sydney Wanderers	Unattached
24 August 2026	(New Zealand) Ava Collins	Western Sydney Wanderers	Unattached
24 August 2026	Amy Harrison	Western Sydney Wanderers	Unattached
24 August 2026	(China) Wang Ying	Western Sydney Wanderers	Unattached
25 August 2026	Caitlin Karic	Melbourne City	Unattached
25 August 2026	(England) Ellie Wilson	Melbourne City	Unattached
25 August 2026	Jessika Nash	Unattached	Melbourne City
26 August 2026	Isabel Hodgson	Adelaide United	Brisbane Roar
26 August 2026	(United States) Tessa Salvestrin	(Portugal) Torreense	Adelaide United
26 August 2026	(New Zealand) Indiah-Paige Riley	Unattached	Wellington Phoenix
26 August 2026	Abbey Lemon	Sydney FC	Unattached
27 August 2026	(Philippines) Katrina Guillou	Unattached	Brisbane Roar
27 August 2026	(Japan) Momo Hayashi	Brisbane Roar	Melbourne City
27 August 2026	Sarah Langman	Central Coast Mariners	Western Sydney Wanderers
28 August 2026	(United States) Abby Smothers	Unattached	Brisbane Roar
29 August 2026	Rosie Curtis	Melbourne Victory	Brisbane Roar
30 August 2026	Natalie Tathem	Perth Glory	Brisbane Roar
1 September 2026	Annabel Martin	Central Coast Mariners	Brisbane Roar
1 September 2026	Alyssa Dall'Oste	Unattached	Perth Glory
1 September 2026	Rhianna Pollicina	Melbourne Victory	Western Sydney Wanderers
2 September 2026	(United States) Murphy Agnew	Unattached	Brisbane Roar
3 September 2026	(United States) Kelli McGroarty	(Australia) Essendon Royals	Melbourne City
3 September 2026	(United States) Allie Thornton	(United States) Dallas Trinity	Newcastle Jets
3 September 2026	Poppy Channing	Unattached	Sydney FC
3 September 2026	(United States) Kiley Dulaney	Unattached	Sydney FC
3 September 2026	(United States) Kenzie Roling	Unattached	Sydney FC
3 September 2026	Sophie Aungle	Western Sydney Wanderers Academy	Sydney FC
3 September 2026	Annabelle Croll	Western Sydney Wanderers	Sydney FC
4 September 2026	Baxter Thew	Central Coast Mariners	Perth Glory
4 September 2026	(United States) Cameron Valladares	(United States) Arizona State Sun Devils	Newcastle Jets
4 September 2026	Leticia McKenna	Melbourne City	(England) Nottingham Forest
7 September 2026	(Norway) Silje Bjørneboe	(Norway) Stabæk	Western Sydney Wanderers (loan)
8 September 2026	Sakura Leong	Unattached	Perth Glory
8 September 2026	(United States) Alex Klos	(United States) California Golden Bears	Newcastle Jets
9 September 2026	(Philippines) Hali Long	Unattached	Brisbane Roar
10 September 2026	Estelle Fragale	(Australia) APIA Leichhardt	Western Sydney Wanderers
10 September 2026	Lily Punch	(Australia) Queensland Academy of Sport	Brisbane Roar
10 September 2026	Chloe Walandouw	(Australia) Northern Tigers	Newcastle Jets
11 September 2026	India Breier	Newcastle Jets	Adelaide United
11 September 2026	Kiera Meyers	Brisbane Roar	Adelaide United
11 September 2026	Isabella Chidiac	Unattached	Western Sydney Wanderers
11 September 2026	Emily Condon	Adelaide United	Canberra United
12 September 2026	Skye Halmarick	Sydney FC	Central Coast Mariners
14 September 2026	Danika Matos	Western Sydney Wanderers	Central Coast Mariners
15 September 2026	Maja Markovski	Unattached	Brisbane Roar
16 September 2026	(Philippines) Angela Beard	Brisbane Roar	Melbourne Victory
16 September 2026	Ayana Aoyagi	Melbourne City	Melbourne Victory
16 September 2026	Alicia Woods	Brisbane Roar	Melbourne Victory
16 September 2026	Sophie Harding	Unattached	Melbourne Victory
16 September 2026	Emily Roach	Unattached	Brisbane Roar
17 September 2026	(Philippines) Skye Leach	Unattached	Melbourne Victory
17 September 2026	Lauren Allan	Newcastle Jets	Retired
17 September 2026	(New Zealand) Milly Clegg	(Sweden) Vittsjö GIK	Wellington Phoenix
18 September 2026	(Philippines) Madison Ayson (Note: Ayson spent the off-season at California Storm)	Sydney FC	Canberra United
18 September 2026	Sarah Morgan	Adelaide United	Canberra United
18 September 2026	(New Zealand) Kelli Brown	Newcastle Jets	Canberra United
18 September 2026	(Philippines) Carleigh Frilles	Unattached	Western Sydney Wanderers
19 September 2026	Morgan Aquino	Unattached	Central Coast Mariners
20 September 2026	Talia Kapetanellis	(Australia) APIA Leichhardt	Central Coast Mariners
20 September 2026	(New Zealand) Te Reremoana Walker	(Australia) APIA Leichhardt	Central Coast Mariners
21 September 2026	(New Zealand) Charlotte Lancaster (Note: Lancaster spent the off-season at APIA Leichhardt)	Newcastle Jets	Central Coast Mariners
19 September 2026	Zoe Tolland	Adelaide United	Canberra United
21 September 2026	(United States) Claire Henninger	(Portugal) Damaiense	Newcastle Jets
21 September 2026	Caley Tallon-Henniker	Sydney FC	Canberra United
22 September 2026	(United States) Bella Yakel	Unattached	Adelaide United
22 September 2026	(Jamaica) Tianna Harris	Unattached	Adelaide United
22 September 2026	Tehya Aspland	(Australia) Canberra Olympic	Canberra United
23 September 2026	Akeisha Sandhu	(Australia) Essendon Royals	Newcastle Jets
23 September 2026	Daisy McGreadie-Cole	(Australia) Football West NTC	Perth Glory
23 September 2026	Theodora Mouithys	(Australia) Football West NTC	Perth Glory
23 September 2026	Hayley Muir	Western Sydney Wanderers Academy	Perth Glory
23 September 2026	Sofia Sakalis	Melbourne Victory	Western Sydney Wanderers
24 September 2026	Sofia Palywoda	(Australia) Box Hill United	Western Sydney Wanderers
25 September 2026	Poppie Hooks	Western Sydney Wanderers	Newcastle Jets
26 September 2026	(New Zealand) Ella McCann	Wellington Phoenix	(New Zealand) Eastern Suburbs
26 September 2026	Kiara De Domizio	Canberra United	Central Coast Mariners
26 September 2026	Alexia Karrys-Stahl	Unatached	Central Coast Mariners
26 September 2026	(New Zealand) Rebecca Lake	(Vietnam) Thái Nguyên T&T	Central Coast Mariners
26 September 2026	(Colombia) Elexa Bahr	Unattached	Western Sydney Wanderers
28 September 2026	Tamar Levin	Central Coast Mariners	Newcastle Jets
3 October 2026	Kirsty Fenton	Sydney FC	Unattached
12 October 2026	Olivia Price	Western Sydney Wanderers	Sydney FC
12 October 2026	Poppy Tay	(Australia) Sydney University	Sydney FC
12 October 2026	Josie Wilson	Newcastle Jets	Sydney FC
12 October 2026	Laura Pickett	Melbourne Victory	Western Sydney Wanderers
13 October 2026	Fiorina Iaria	Melbourne Victory	Central Coast Mariners
13 October 2026	Tully Heatley	(Australia) Queensland Academy of Sport	Melbourne City
14 October 2026	Sofia Fante	Sydney FC	Western Sydney Wanderers
15 October 2026	Danella Butrus	Melbourne City	Unattached
15 October 2026	(Switzerland) Anna Sutter	(Sweden) Eskilstuna United	Melbourne Victory
15 October 2026	(United States) Morgan Witz	Unattached	Central Coast Mariners
16 October 2026	(New Zealand) Lara Wall	Unattached	Wellington Phoenix
16 October 2026	Princess Ibini	(Turkey) Beşiktaş	Melbourne City
16 October 2026	Keira Bobbin	Canberra United	Unattached
16 October 2026	Ava Briedis	Canberra United	Unattached
16 October 2026	Janet King	Canberra United	Unattached
16 October 2026	Alex McKenzie	Canberra United	Unattached
16 October 2026	Emma Robers	Canberra United	Unattached
16 October 2026	(United States) Jazmin Wardlow	Canberra United	Unattached
16 October 2026	Jaya Bowman	Central Coast Mariners	Unattached
16 October 2026	Baylee Broomhead	Central Coast Mariners	Unattached
16 October 2026	(United States) Cannon Clough	Central Coast Mariners	Unattached
16 October 2026	Isabella Coco-Di Sipio	Central Coast Mariners	Unattached
16 October 2026	Jynaya dos Santos	Central Coast Mariners	Unattached
16 October 2026	Maya Fernandez	Central Coast Mariners	Unattached
16 October 2026	Jessica Young	Melbourne Victory	Unattached
16 October 2026	Meg Phillips	Perth Glory	Unattached
16 October 2026	Dayle Schroeder	Perth Glory	Unattached
16 October 2026	Jessica Skinner	Perth Glory	Unattached

=== Mid-season ===
Date	Name	Moving from	Moving to
21 October 2026	Chloe Murray	(Australia) Queensland Academy of Sport	Perth Glory
23 October 2026	Charlotte Hrehoresin	Unattached	Canberra United
23 October 2026	Lily McMahon	(Australia) Northern Tigers	Canberra United
23 October 2026	(Austria) Naïla Schoefberger	(United States) Kansas City Current II	Canberra United
23 October 2026	Angelina Scamardella	Unattached	Sydney FC
26 October 2026	(United States) Erin Flurey	Unattached	Newcastle Jets
29 October 2026	Chelsea McCredie	Sydney FC	Unattached
29 October 2026	Lauren Nada	Sydney FC	Unattached
29 October 2026	Angelina Scamardella	Sydney FC	Unattached
29 October 2026	Asha Sutton	Sydney FC	Unattached
29 October 2026	Poppy Tay	Sydney FC	Unattached
29 October 2026	Josie Wilson	Sydney FC	Unattached

== Re-signings ==
Date	Name	Club
24 April 2026	Miriam Zumaya (Note: Player signed a two-year extension.)	Western Sydney Wanderers
6 May 2026	Allyssa Ng-Saad	Western Sydney Wanderers
11 May 2026	Frida Karaberis (Note: Player signed a three-year extension.)	Western Sydney Wanderers
13 May 2026	Alvina Khoshaba	Western Sydney Wanderers
14 May 2026	Talia Younis	Western Sydney Wanderers
1 June 2026	Adriana Taranto	Adelaide United
1 June 2026	Melissa Taranto	Adelaide United
12 June 2026	(New Zealand) Victoria Esson	Wellington Phoenix
17 June 2026	(New Zealand) Aimee Danieli	Wellington Phoenix
3 July 2026	Holly Murray	Adelaide United
3 July 2026	Carina Rossi	Adelaide United
13 July 2026	(New Zealand) Manaia Elliott	Wellington Phoenix
22 July 2026	Charlotte McLean	Sydney FC
31 July 2026	(New Zealand) Zoe Benson	Wellington Phoenix
31 July 2026	Teresa Morrissey	Perth Glory
31 July 2026	Mischa Anderson	Perth Glory
31 July 2026	(Philippines) Emma Tovar	Perth Glory
31 July 2026	Daisy McAllister	Perth Glory
31 July 2026	(Wales) Megan Wynne	Perth Glory
31 July 2026	Susan Phonsongkham	Perth Glory
31 July 2026	Bronte Trew	Perth Glory
31 July 2026	Olivia Wood	Perth Glory
31 July 2026	Ella Abdul-Massih	Perth Glory
31 July 2026	Isobel Dalton	Perth Glory
31 July 2026	Julia Sardo	Perth Glory
31 July 2026	Ella Lincoln	Perth Glory
31 July 2026	Charli Wainwright	Perth Glory
31 July 2026	Clancy Westaway	Perth Glory
3 August 2026	Emma Dundas	Newcastle Jets
4 August 2026	Aideen Keane	Melbourne City
5 August 2026	Karly Roestbakken	Melbourne City
6 August 2026	Georgia Ritchie	Newcastle Jets
7 August 2026	(Spain) Malena Mieres	Melbourne City
7 August 2026	Alexis Collins	Newcastle Jets
10 August 2026	Emma Bates	Newcastle Jets
11 August 2026	Claire Adams	Newcastle Jets
19 August 2026	(New Zealand) Deven Jackson	Melbourne City
19 August 2026	Natalie Tobin	Sydney FC
21 August 2026	Grace Kuilamu	Brisbane Roar
22 August 2026	Zara Kruger	Brisbane Roar
23 August 2026	Sharn Freier	Brisbane Roar (Note: Freier was on loan from VfL Wolfsburg, and then signed a permanent contract.)
24 August 2026	Alyse Oppedisano	Sydney FC
24 August 2026	Tiahna Robertson	Sydney FC
25 August 2026	(United States) Josie Studer	Brisbane Roar
25 August 2026	Natasha Prior	Newcastle Jets
25 August 2026	Sarah Hunter	Sydney FC
27 August 2026	Ruby Sullivan	Sydney FC
28 August 2026	Peta Trimis	Central Coast Mariners
31 August 2026	Greta Kraszula	Central Coast Mariners
31 August 2026	Annabelle Croll	Western Sydney Wanderers
2 September 2026	(Switzerland) Lorena Baumann	Central Coast Mariners
2 September 2026	Tiana Fuller	Central Coast Mariners
3 September 2026	Eliza Familton	Central Coast Mariners
3 September 2026	Taren King	Central Coast Mariners
3 September 2026	Liz Barwick-Grey	Central Coast Mariners
6 September 2026	Bethany Gordon	Canberra United
6 September 2026	Sally James	Canberra United
7 September 2026	Kijah Stephenson	Brisbane Roar
7 September 2026	Holly Furphy	Melbourne Victory
7 September 2026	Alana Jancevski	Melbourne Victory
7 September 2026	Grace Maher	Melbourne Victory
7 September 2026	Ella O'Grady	Melbourne Victory
7 September 2026	Laura Pickett	Melbourne Victory
7 September 2026	Sienna Saveska	Melbourne Victory
8 September 2026	Michelle Heyman	Canberra United
9 September 2026	Ally Boertje	Newcastle Jets
9 September 2026	Kaiya Buchanan	Central Coast Mariners
9 September 2026	Annalee Grove	Central Coast Mariners
9 September 2026	Tess Quilligan	Central Coast Mariners
13 September 2026	Hayley Taylor-Young	Canberra United
14 September 2026	Coco Majstorovic	Canberra United
14 September 2026	Eliza Evans	Canberra United
14 September 2026	(New Zealand) Claudia Bunge	Melbourne Victory
14 September 2026	Chelsea Blissett	Melbourne Victory
15 September 2026	Sasha Grove	Canberra United
15 September 2026	Sofia Christopherson	Canberra United
15 September 2026	Nicki Flannery	Melbourne Victory
15 September 2026	(New Zealand) Zoe McMeeken	Melbourne Victory
15 September 2026	Courtney Newbon	Melbourne Victory
16 September 2026	Darcey Malone	Canberra United
16 September 2026	(Japan) Nanako Sasaki	Canberra United
16 September 2026	Libby Copus-Brown	Newcastle Jets
17 September 2026	Lillian Skelly	Canberra United
17 September 2026	Sienna Dale	Canberra United
18 September 2026	Zoe Karipidis	Newcastle Jets
18 September 2026	Melissa Barbieri	Melbourne City
22 September 2026	Cassidy Davis	Newcastle Jets
22 September 2026	Maeve Nicholas	Adelaide United
23 September 2026	(New Zealand) Elizabeth Anton	Canberra United
7 October 2026	Leyla Hussein	Melbourne Victory
7 October 2026	Chloe McKenzie	Melbourne Victory
7 October 2026	Poppy O'Keeffe	Melbourne Victory
7 October 2026	Sienna Tachera	Melbourne Victory
11 October 2026	Sophia Varley	Central Coast Mariners
12 October 2026	(New Zealand) Brooke Neary	Wellington Phoenix
12 October 2026	(New Zealand) Mikaela Bangalan	Wellington Phoenix
15 October 2026	Dali Gorr-Burchmore	Melbourne City
15 October 2026	Keira Sarris	Melbourne City
15 October 2026	Amelie Millar	Adelaide United
16 October 2026	Chloe Lincoln	Brisbane Roar
16 October 2026	Madeleine Caspers	Sydney FC
16 October 2026	Nikkita Fazzari	Western Sydney Wanderers
17 October 2026	(New Zealand) Lily Brazendale	Wellington Phoenix
