= List of foreign A-League Women players =

This is a list of foreign players in the Australian A-League Women which commenced play in 2008 as the W-League and was rebranded in 2021. The following players must meet both of the following two criteria:

1. Have played in at least one A-League Women game (including finals). Players who were signed by A-League Women clubs, but did not play in any competitive games, are not included.
2. Are considered foreign, i.e., outside Australia determined by the following:

A player is considered foreign if she is not eligible to play for the national team of Australia.

More specifically,

- If a player has been capped on international level, the national team is used; if she has been capped by more than one country, the highest level (or the most recent) team is used. These include Australia players with dual citizenship.
- If a player has not been capped on international level, her country of birth is used, except those who were born abroad from Australian parents or moved to Australia at a young age, and those who clearly indicated to have switched her nationality to another nation.

Clubs listed are those which have contracted the player. Note that calendar years are used. This follows general practice in expressing years a player spent at club.

As of October 2026, 51 different nations have been represented in the A-League Women. Jamaica is the most recent nation to be represented with Tianna Harris debuting for Adelaide United on 18 October 2026.

In bold: players who are currently active with an A-League Women club.

== Argentina ==
- Gaby Garton – Melbourne Victory – 2020–21

== Bosnia and Herzegovina ==
- Emina Ekic – Melbourne City – 2022–23, 2023–24

== Brazil ==
- Bárbara – Melbourne City – 2024
- Camila – Canberra United – 2019–20
- Laís Araújo – Adelaide United – 2019–20
- Mariel Hecher – Brisbane Roar – 2020–25
- Mônica – Adelaide United – 2016–17

== Bulgaria ==
- Evdokiya Popadinova – Brisbane Roar – 2024–25

== Cameroon ==
- Estelle Johnson – Sydney FC – 2011–12

== Canada ==
- Lindsay Agnew – Sydney FC – 2020
- Sasha Andrews – Perth Glory – 2012–14
- Brittany Baxter – Melbourne Victory – 2008–09
- Kennedy Faulknor – Canberra United – 2022–23
- Rylee Foster – Wellington Phoenix – 2023–24
- Isabella Habuda – Western Sydney Wanderers – 2021–22
- Kathryn Harvey – Melbourne City – 2024–25
- Christina Julien – Perth Glory – 2013–14
- Danielle Krzyzaniak – Newcastle Jets – 2024–25
- Carmelina Moscato – Western Sydney Wanderers – 2015–16
- Lysianne Proulx – Melbourne City – 2023–24
- Leah Robinson – Adelaide United – 2008–09
- Katie Thorlakson – Melbourne Victory – 2009
- Shelina Zadorsky – Perth Glory – 2014

== Chile ==
- María José Rojas – Canberra United – 2018, 2023–24, Adelaide United – 2020–21, Sydney FC – 2021–22, Melbourne City – 2022–23

== China ==
- Wang Ying – Western Sydney Wanderers – 2025–26
- Wu Chengshu – Canberra United – 2022–23
- Wurigumula – Central Coast Mariners – 2023–24
- Xiao Yuyi – Adelaide United – 2022–23
- Yuan Cong – Western Sydney Wanderers – 2025–26

== Chinese Taipei ==
- Tseng Shu-o – Canberra United – 2009–11
- Lin Chiung-ying – Canberra United – 2009

== Colombia ==
- **Elexa Bahr** – **Western Sydney Wanderers** – 2026–
- Isabel Dehakiz – Western United – 2024–25
- Sandra Ibarguen – Western United – 2024–25

== Costa Rica ==
- Raquel Rodríguez – Perth Glory – 2017–18

== Croatia ==
- **Bianca Galic** – Canberra United – 2020–21, Western Sydney Wanderers – 2021–22, Central Coast Mariners – 2023–25, **Sydney FC** – 2025–

== Czech Republic ==
- Jitka Chlastáková – Western Sydney Wanderers – 2022–23

== Denmark ==
- Tine Cederkvist – Perth Glory – 2010–11
- Nina Frausing-Pedersen – Brisbane Roar – 2016–17
- Hannah Holgersen – Adelaide United – 2023, Brisbane Roar – 2023–24
- Kathrine Larsen – Western United – 2024
- Mie Leth Jans – Perth Glory – 2021–22
- Rikke Madsen – Melbourne Victory – 2022–23
- Theresa Nielsen – Melbourne City – 2018–19
- Cathrine Paaske-Sørensen – Sydney FC – 2009
- Katrine Pedersen – Adelaide United – 2014–15
- Julie Rydahl Bukh – Sydney FC – 2009
- Cecilie Sandvej – Perth Glory – 2013–14

== Dominican Republic ==
- Lucía León – Adelaide United – 2024–25, Wellington Phoenix – 2025–26

== England ==
- Laura Bassett – Canberra United – 2017–18
- Hannah Beard – Brisbane Roar – 2012–13, Newcastle Jets – 2013–14, Western Sydney Wanderers – 2014–16
- Faye Bryson – Central Coast Mariners – 2023–24, Sydney FC – 2024–25
- Abby Clarke – Adelaide United – 2024–25
- Katy Coghlan – Perth Glory – 2008–09
- Gemma Craine – Perth Glory – 2020–22
- Natasha Dowie – Melbourne Victory – 2015–20
- Lizzie Durack – Western Sydney Wanderers – 2012–13
- Millie Farrow – Perth Glory – 2023–24, Sydney FC – 2024–25, Central Coast Mariners – 2025–26
- Olivia Fergusson – Wellington Phoenix – 2024–25
- Katie Holtham – Perth Glory – 2011–12, 2015–16, Adelaide United – 2014–15
- Mikaela Howell – Newcastle Jets – 2012–13
- Kristy Moore – Adelaide United – 2012–15
- **Brooke Nunn** – Central Coast Mariners – 2024–25, **Wellington Phoenix** – 2025–
- Jade Pennock – Central Coast Mariners – 2024–25
- Carrie Simpson – Brisbane Roar – 2015–16
- Laura Stockdale – Adelaide United – 2013–14
- Jodie Taylor – Melbourne Victory – 2010–12, Sydney FC – 2013–14, Canberra United – 2015–16, Melbourne City – 2017–19
- Carly Telford – Perth Glory – 2012–13
- **Danielle Turner** – **Melbourne City** – 2025–
- Chioma Ubogagu – Brisbane Roar – 2018–19
- Ellie Wilson – Melbourne Victory – 2024–25, Melbourne City – 2025–26
- Fiona Worts – Adelaide United – 2020–23, 2024–26, Sydney FC – 2023–24

== France ==
- Margot Robinne – Melbourne City – 2020–21, Canberra United – 2021–22, Brisbane Roar – 2022–23

== Germany ==
- Nadine Angerer – Brisbane Roar – 2013–15
- Ariane Hingst – Newcastle Jets – 2011–12, Canberra United – 2012–13
- **Samantha Iredale** – **Western Sydney Wanderers** – 2026–

== Ghana ==
- Elizabeth Addo – Western Sydney Wanderers – 2018–19

== Haiti ==
- Laurie-Ann Moïse – Sydney FC – 2025–26

== Guyana ==
- Sydney Cummings – Western United – 2022–23

== Hong Kong ==
- Cheung Wai Ki – Brisbane Roar – 2017–18

== Iceland ==
- Fanndís Friðriksdóttir – Adelaide United – 2018–19
- Þóra Björg Helgadóttir – Western Sydney Wanderers – 2012–13
- Gunnhildur Yrsa Jónsdóttir – Adelaide United – 2018–19

== Ireland ==
- Aoife Colvill – Canberra United – 2017–20
- Deborah-Anne De la Harpe – Perth Glory – 2020–22, Sydney FC 2022–23, Brisbane Roar 2023–25
- Lillie Fenlon-Billson – Sydney FC – 2012–13
- Erin Healy – Adelaide United – 2024–26
- Ciara McCormack – Newcastle Jets – 2013–14
- Denise O'Sullivan – Canberra United – 2018–19, Western Sydney Wanderers – 2019–20
- Sarah Rowe – Melbourne Victory – 2023, Central Coast Mariners 2024–25
- Julie-Ann Russell – Western Sydney Wanderers – 2020–21

== Israel ==
- Lee Falkon – Western Sydney Wanderers – 2017–18

== Jamaica ==
- **Tianna Harris** – **Adelaide United** – 2026–

== Japan ==
- Ena Harada – Western Sydney Wanderers – 2024–26
- **Momo Hayashi** – Brisbane Roar – 2024–26, **Melbourne City** – 2026–
- Keiwa Hieda – Western United – 2023–25
- Yukari Kinga – Canberra United – 2016–17, Melbourne City – 2017–20
- Chinatsu Kira – Melbourne City – 2020–21
- Hoshimi Kishi – Brisbane Roar – 2012–13
- Rie Kitano – Brisbane Roar – 2021–22
- Yūki Nagasato – Brisbane Roar – 2018–19
- Kurea Okino – Melbourne Victory – 2023–24
- Reona Omiya – Adelaide United – 2021–22
- **Nanako Sasaki** – Adelaide United – 2021–25, **Canberra United** – 2025–
- Miku Sunaga – Perth Glory – 2024–25
- Mebae Tanaka – Wellington Phoenix – 2024–25
- Sachiko Tatsuoka – Brisbane Roar – 2012–13

== Lebanon ==
- **Tiana Jaber** – **Western Sydney Wanderers** – 2019–20, 2026–, Newcastle Jets – 2020–22, Western United – 2023, Wellington Phoenix – 2023–26

== Mexico ==
- Lourdes Bosch – Melbourne City – 2024–25
- Anisa Guajardo – Melbourne City – 2015–16
- Bianca Henninger – Melbourne Victory – 2016–17
- Verónica Pérez – Canberra United – 2015–16
- Arianna Romero – Perth Glory – 2016–17, 2019–20
- Briana Woodall – Central Coast Mariners – 2023–24

== Nepal ==
- **Sabitra Bhandari** – **Wellington Phoenix** – 2025–

== Netherlands ==
- Bente Jansen – Brisbane Roar – 2025–26
- Tessel Middag – Wellington Phoenix – 2025–26
- Marlous Pieëte – Western Sydney Wanderers – 2017–18
- Maruschka Waldus – Western Sydney Wanderers – 2017–19, Adelaide United – 2020–21, 2022–24

== New Zealand ==
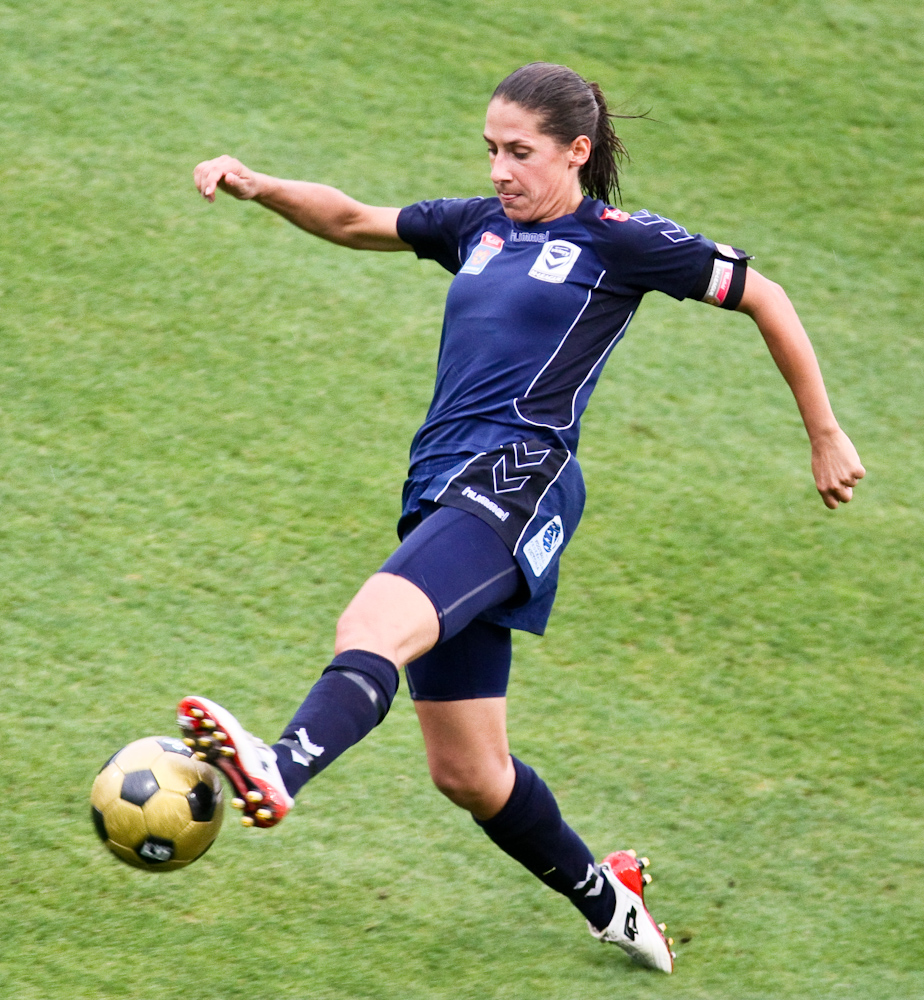
Marlies Oostdam played in the first three W-League seasons for Melbourne Victory.

- Lily Alfeld – Perth Glory – 2020–21
- **Elizabeth Anton** – Perth Glory – 2020–24, **Canberra United** – 2024–25, 2025–
- Hannah Blake – Perth Glory – 2023, Adelaide United – 2023–24
- Katie Bowen – Melbourne City – 2022–23
- Hannah Bromley – Sydney FC – 2012–13, Newcastle Jets – 2015–16
- **Kelli Brown** – Perth Glory – 2024–25, Newcastle Jets – 2025–26, **Canberra United** – 2026–
- **Claudia Bunge** – **Melbourne Victory** – 2020–23, 2024–
- Rebecca Burrows – Newcastle Jets – 2023
- Olivia Chance – Brisbane Roar – 2020–21
- Aroon Clansey – Canberra United – 2011–12
- Milly Clegg – Western Sydney Wanderers – 2023–24
- Ava Collins – Western Sydney Wanderers – 2026
- Katie Duncan – Melbourne Victory – 2013–14
- **Brianna Edwards** – Sydney FC – 2024–25, **Western Sydney Wanderers** – 2025–
- Abby Erceg – Adelaide United – 2011–13
- Anna Green – Adelaide United – 2011, Sydney FC – 2013–14, 2022–23
- **Deven Jackson** – Canberra United – 2023–24, Newcastle Jets – 2024–25, **Melbourne City** – 2025–
- Grace Jale – Canberra United – 2022–23, Perth Glory – 2023–24
- **Maggie Jenkins** – **Perth Glory** – 2026–
- Emma Kete – Perth Glory – 2011, Canberra United – 2012, 2015–16, Sydney FC – 2012–14
- **Rebecca Lake** – **Central Coast Mariners** – 2026–
- **Charlotte Lancaster** – Newcastle Jets – 2025–26, **Central Coast Mariners** – 2026–
- Anna Leat – Newcastle Jets – 2025–26
- Annalie Longo – Sydney FC – 2012–13, Melbourne Victory – 2019–21
- Sarah McLaughlin – Adelaide United – 2012–13
- **Zoe McMeeken** – **Melbourne Victory** – 2025–
- Elizabeth Milne – Perth Glory – 2012–13, Adelaide United – 2015–16
- **Ruby Nathan** – **Canberra United** – 2023–
- Marlies Oostdam – Melbourne Victory – 2008–11
- Olivia Page – Newcastle Jets – 2025–26
- Briar Palmer – Melbourne Victory – 2015–16
- Holly Patterson – Adelaide United – 2012–13
- Indiah-Paige Riley – Brisbane Roar – 2018–20, 2023
- Emma Rolston – Sydney FC – 2017–18
- Paige Satchell – Canberra United – 2020–21, Sydney FC – 2021–22
- Rebecca Smith – Newcastle Jets – 2008–09
- Malia Steinmetz – Perth Glory – 2020–21, Western Sydney Wanderers – 2021–23
- **Rebekah Stott** – Brisbane Roar – 2010–11, Melbourne Victory – 2011–13, **Melbourne City** – 2015–20, 2021–22, 2023–
- Rebecca Tegg – Melbourne Victory – 2008–09
- Marisa van der Meer – Melbourne City – 2021–22
- **Te Reremoana Walker** – **Central Coast Mariners** – 2026–
- Hannah Wilkinson – Melbourne City – 2021–24
- Kirsty Yallop – Brisbane Roar – 2015–16

== Nigeria ==
- Francisca Ordega – Sydney FC – 2016–17
- Chinaza Uchendu – Melbourne City – 2025–26
- **Onyinyechi Zogg** – **Perth Glory** – 2024–

== Norway ==
- **Silje Bjørneboe** – **Western Sydney Wanderers** – 2026–
- Noor Eckhoff – Melbourne City – 2021
- Marie Dølvik Markussen – Newcastle Jets – 2021–22
- Elise Thorsnes – Canberra United – 2017–18, 2019–20
- Lisa-Marie Woods – Perth Glory – 2011, Adelaide United – 2013–15

== Panama ==
- **Riley Cohn** – **Sydney FC** – 2025–

== Philippines ==
- **Madison Ayson** – **Canberra United** – 2024–25, 2026–, Sydney FC – 2025–26
- **Angela Beard** – Brisbane Roar – 2014–17, 2026, **Melbourne Victory** – 2017–21, 2026–, Western United – 2023
- Sarina Bolden – Western Sydney Wanderers – 2022–23, Newcastle Jets – 2023–24
- Jessika Cowart – Perth Glory – 2023–24
- Janae DeFazio – Western Sydney Wanderers – 2025–26
- Sara Eggesvik – Western United – 2024–25
- **Carleigh Frilles** – **Western Sydney Wanderers** – 2026–
- **Katrina Guillou** – **Brisbane Roar** – 2026–
- **Skye Leach** – **Melbourne Victory** – 2026–
- **Hali Long** – **Brisbane Roar** – 2026–
- Quinley Quezada – Perth Glory – 2023–24
- Jaclyn Sawicki –Western United – 2022–24
- **Emma Tovar** – **Perth Glory** – 2025–

== Portugal ==
- Carolina Vilão – Wellington Phoenix – 2024–25

== Scotland ==
- Jen Beattie – Melbourne City – 2015–16
- Rachel Corsie – Canberra United – 2018–19
- Claire Emslie – Melbourne City – 2019–20
- Kim Little – Melbourne City – 2015–16
- Louise Mason – Adelaide United – 2013–14

== Serbia ==
- Milica Mijatović – Melbourne City – 2019–20
- Vesna Milivojević – Western Sydney Wanderers – 2019–20, Canberra United – 2022–24
- Mary Stanić-Floody – Sydney FC – 2021–23, Canberra United – 2023–26
- Tyla-Jay Vlajnic – Melbourne City – 2015–22, 2024–25, Western United – 2022–24

== Singapore ==
- Lim Shiya – Perth Glory – 2008–09
- Danelle Tan – Brisbane Roar – 2024–25

== South Africa ==
- Refiloe Jane – Canberra United – 2018–19
- Rhoda Mulaudzi – Canberra United – 2018–19

== South Korea ==
- Jeon Ga-eul – Melbourne Victory – 2017–18
- Kim So-eun – Western Sydney Wanderers – 2025–26

== Spain ==
- Celia Jiménez – Perth Glory – 2019–20
- Olga Cebrian García – Brisbane Roar – 2011–12
- **Malena Mieres** – **Melbourne City** – 2024–

== Sweden ==
- Louise Fors – Western Sydney Wanderers – 2012–13
- Sanna Frostevall – Newcastle Jets – 2008–09
- Petra Larsson – Melbourne Victory – 2012–13
- Kajsa Lind – Brisbane Roar – 2022–23
- Alexandra Nilsson – Perth Glory – 2010–11
- Sofie Persson – Brisbane Roar – 2015–16
- Jessica Samuelsson – Melbourne Victory – 2013

== Switzerland ==
- **Lorena Baumann** – Newcastle Jets – 2023–25, **Central Coast Mariners** – 2025–
- **Anna Sutter** – **Melbourne Victory** – 2026–

== Trinidad and Tobago ==
- Kennya Cordner – Brisbane Roar – 2010–11

== Turkey ==
- Gülcan Koca – Melbourne Victory – 2009–18

== United States ==
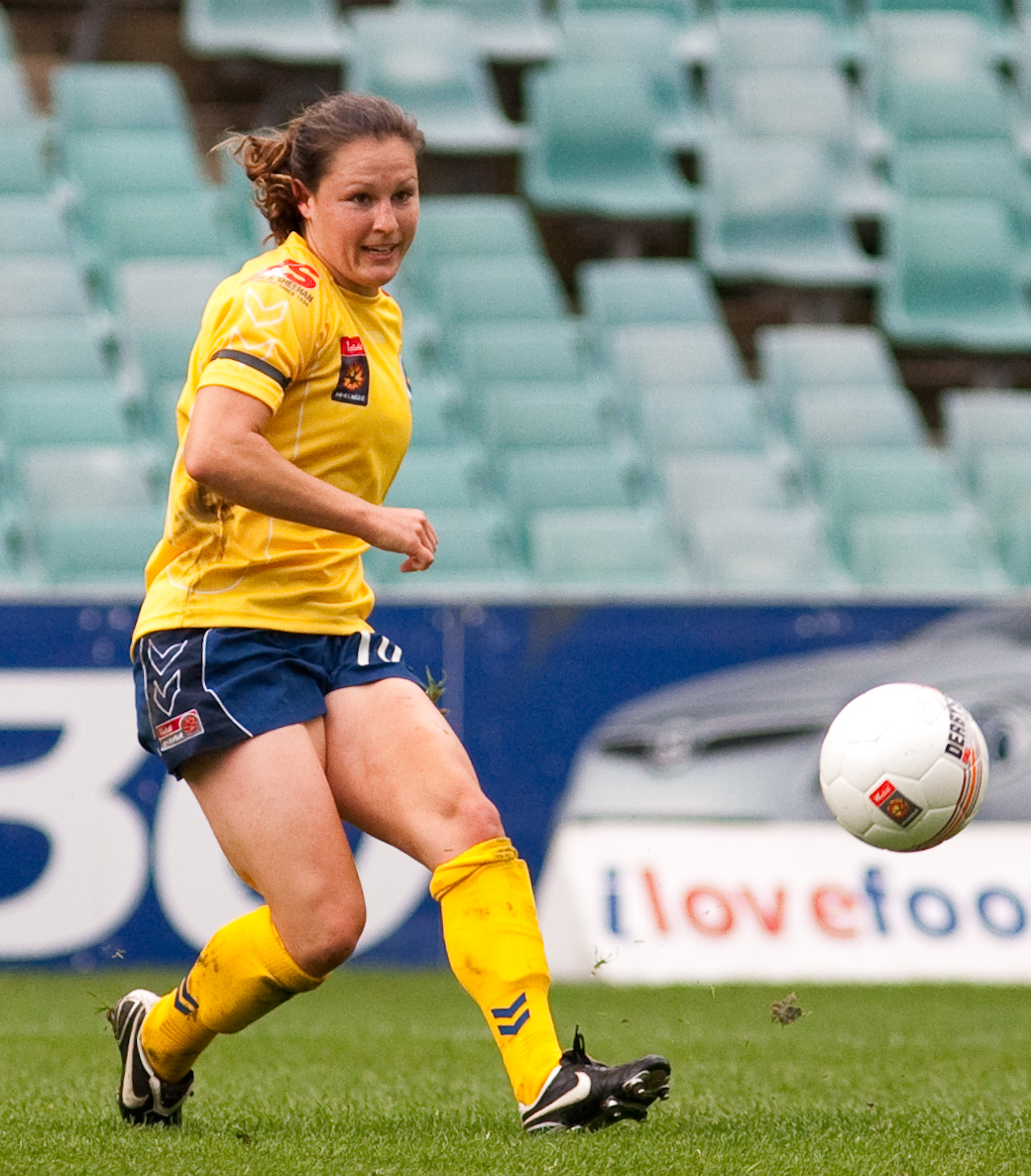
Kendall Fletcher has played for four W-League clubs.

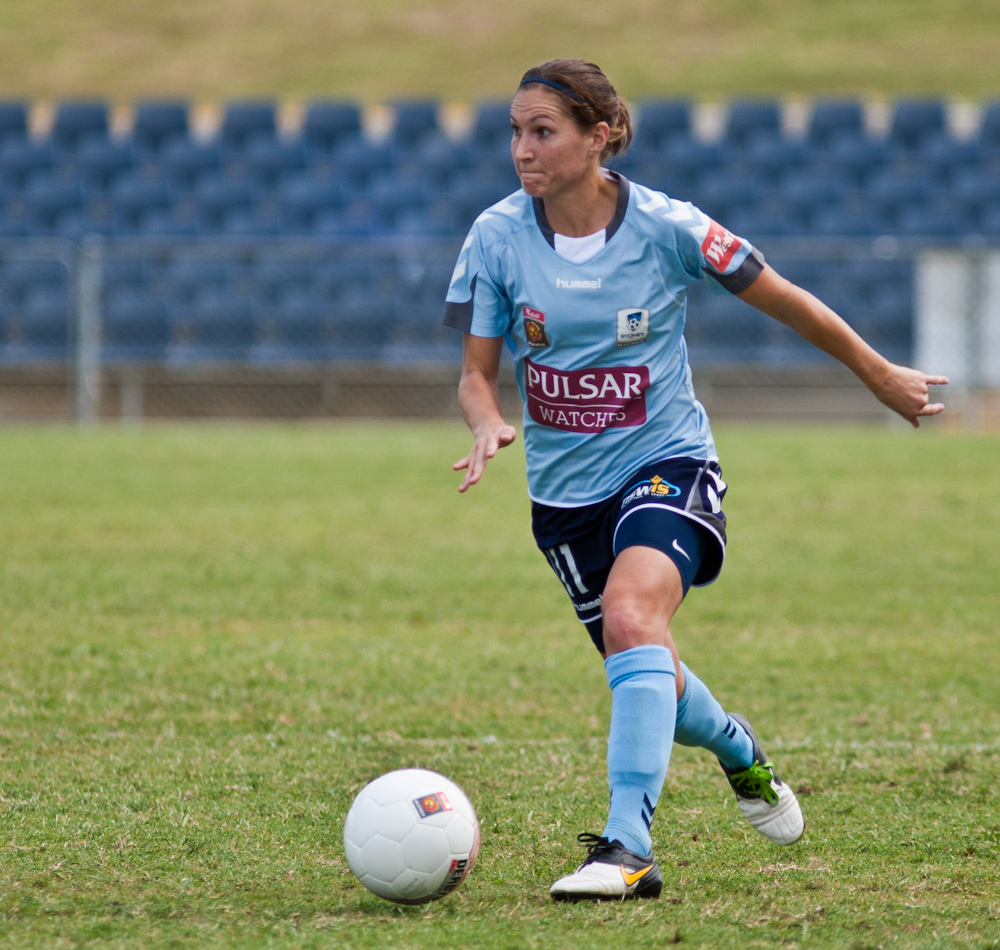
Lydia Vandenbergh won the W-League Premiership with Sydney FC in 2010–11.

- **Murphy Agnew** – Newcastle Jets – 2022–23, **Brisbane Roar** – 2026–
- Morgan Andrews – Perth Glory – 2019–20
- Mackenzie Anthony – Wellington Phoenix – 2026
- Alex Arlitt – Western Sydney Wanderers – 2016–17
- Julia Ashley – Adelaide United – 2019–20
- Josie Aulicino – Canberra United – 2025–26
- **Rola Badawiya** – Sydney – 2023, Central Coast Mariners – 2023–24, **Perth Glory** – 2025–
- Rylee Baisden – Brisbane Roar – 2019–20, Perth Glory – 2022–23
- Lauren Barnes – Melbourne Victory – 2013–15, Melbourne City – 2016–20
- Hillary Beall – Western United – 2022–23, 2023–24
- Michelle Betos – Sydney FC – 2015–16
- Aubrey Bledsoe – Sydney FC – 2017–20
- Jordyn Bloomer – Western Sydney Wanderers – 2022–23
- Tess Boade – Western Sydney Wanderers – 2022
- Tiffany Boshers – Newcastle Jets – 2012–13
- Celeste Boureille – Canberra United – 2016–17, Brisbane Roar – 2017–20
- Hope Breslin – Wellington Phoenix – 2023–24
- Amber Brooks – Adelaide United – 2018–20
- Vicky Bruce – Western Sydney Wanderers – 2023–24
- Simone Charley – Canberra United – 2019–20
- Sarah Clark – Canberra United – 2023–24
- Georgia Cloepfil – Melbourne Victory – 2015
- Cannon Clough – Brisbane Roar – 2021–22, Newcastle Jets – 2022–23, Canberra United – 2023–24, Central Coast Mariners – 2025–26
- Danielle Colaprico – Adelaide United – 2016–18, Sydney FC – 2018–19
- Gabriella Coleman – Perth Glory – 2022–23
- Kaylie Collins – Western Sydney Wanderers – 2023–24
- Shea Connors – Brisbane Roar – 2020, 2021–23, Sydney FC – 2023–25
- Mia Corbin – Brisbane Roar – 2023–24
- Isabel Cox – Wellington Phoenix – 2023–24
- Niki Cross – Newcastle Jets – 2010–11
- Abby Dahlkemper – Adelaide United – 2015–16
- Sara D'Appolonia – Melbourne Victory – 2023–25
- Hailey Davidson – Wellington Phoenix – 2023–24
- Vanessa DiBernardo – Perth Glory – 2015–17
- Makenzy Doniak – Adelaide United – 2017–18
- **Kiley Dulaney** – **Sydney FC** – 2026–
- Caprice Dydasco – Newcastle Jets – 2015–16
- Britt Eckerstrom – Newcastle Jets – 2017–19
- Elizabeth Eddy – Newcastle Jets – 2021–22
- Brooke Elby – Melbourne Victory – 2015–16
- Maddy Evans – Brisbane Roar – 2016–17
- Kendall Fletcher – Central Coast Mariners – 2009, Melbourne Victory – 2010–12, Canberra United – 2013–16, 2017–18, 2020–21, Western Sydney Wanderers – 2016–17
- Amanda Frisbie – Perth Glory – 2017–18
- Emily Garnier – Newcastle Jets – 2022–23
- Christina Gibbons – Melbourne Victory – 2017–18
- Shawna Gordon – Western Sydney Wanderers – 2013–14
- Sarah Griffith – Newcastle Jets – 2022–23
- Julia Grosso – Melbourne City – 2022–24
- Ashleigh Gunning – Adelaide United – 2010–12
- Madison Haley – Sydney FC – 2022–23
- Kristen Hamilton – Western Sydney Wanderers – 2019–20
- Hensley Hancuff – Brisbane Roar – 2022–23
- Tori Hansen – Melbourne Victory – 2023–24
- Haley Hanson – Melbourne Victory – 2019–20
- Ally Haran – Canberra United – 2021–22
- Ashley Hatch – Melbourne City – 2017–18
- Emma Hawkins – Canberra United – 2025–26
- Taryn Hemmings – Canberra United – 2011–12
- Brooke Hendrix – Melbourne Victory – 2022
- **Claire Henninger** – **Newcastle Jets** – 2026–
- Rachel Hill – Perth Glory – 2017–19
- Cyera Hintzen – Perth Glory – 2022–23
- Heather Hinz – Sydney FC – 2025–26
- Gabby Hollar – Perth Glory – 2024–26
- Jenna Holtz – Adelaide United – 2023–24
- Jen Hoy – Newcastle Jets – 2016–17
- Sofia Huerta – Adelaide United – 2016–17, Sydney FC – 2018–20
- Tori Huster – Newcastle Jets – 2012–13, 2014, 2017–18 Western Sydney Wanderers – 2013–14
- Darian Jenkins – Melbourne Victory – 2019–20
- Danielle Johnson – Melbourne Victory – 2011–13
- Kendall Johnson – Western Sydney Wanderers – 2014–16
- Samantha Johnson – Sydney FC – 2014, Melbourne Victory – 2016–17, 2018–19, Melbourne City – 2020–21
- Chantel Jones – Perth Glory – 2013–14, Canberra United – 2014, 2021
- Hannah Keane – Western United – 2022–24
- Alivia Kelly – Wellington Phoenix – 2024–25
- Sarah Killion – Adelaide United – 2015–16
- **Alex Klos** – **Newcastle Jets** – 2026–
- Haley Kopmeyer – Brisbane Roar – 2015–16, Canberra United – 2017–18
- Kaleigh Kurtz – Canberra United – 2019–20
- Lo'eau LaBonta – Western Sydney Wanderers – 2017–19
- Veronica Latsko – Adelaide United – 2018–19, Sydney FC – 2019–20
- Mariah Lee – Adelaide United – 2023–24
- Camille Levin – Western Sydney Wanderers – 2013–14
- Lori Lindsey – Canberra United – 2013–15
- Allison Lipsher – Newcastle Jets – 2010–11, Sydney FC – 2011–12
- Jillian Loyden – Central Coast Mariners – 2009
- Hailie Mace – Melbourne City – 2019
- Alyssa Mautz – Perth Glory – 2016–17, 2018–19, Adelaide United – 2017–18
- Savannah McCaskill – Sydney FC – 2018–19
- Maya McCutcheon – Wellington Phoenix – 2024–25
- Jessica McDonald – Melbourne Victory – 2012–13, Western United – 2022–23
- **Kelli McGroarty** – **Melbourne City** – 2026–
- Kristen McNabb – Melbourne Victory – 2017–18
- Emily Menges – Melbourne Victory – 2019–20
- Kristie Mewis – Canberra United – 2012–13
- Ashlyn Miller – Brisbane Roar – 2025–26
- **Brooke Miller** – **Western Sydney Wanderers** – 2026–
- Sydney Miramontez – Western Sydney Wanderers – 2018–19
- Maliah Morris – Western Sydney Wanderers – 2023–24
- Christine Nairn – Melbourne Victory – 2014–17, 2018–19
- Katie Naughton – Adelaide United – 2016–18, Perth Glory – 2018–19
- Paige Nielsen – Western Sydney Wanderers – 2016–17, Canberra United – 2018
- Izzy Nino – Newcastle Jets – 2023–24
- Stephanie Ochs – Canberra United – 2013–15, 2016–17
- Taylor Otto – Melbourne City – 2023–26
- Megan Oyster – Newcastle Jets – 2015–17
- Carson Pickett – Brisbane Roar – 2017–20
- Jamie Pollock – Melbourne Victory – 2015–16
- Toni Pressley – Canberra United – 2017–18
- Emily Pringle – Brisbane Roar – 2024–25
- Megan Rapinoe – Sydney FC – 2011
- Elli Reed – Melbourne Victory – 2014
- Katherine Reynolds – Newcastle Jets – 2014
- Brianne Riley – Central Coast Mariners – 2024
- **Kenzie Roling** – **Sydney FC** – 2026–
- Katelyn Rowland – Newcastle Jets – 2016–17
- Angela Salem – Newcastle Jets – 2012–13, 2014
- Kaitlyn Savage – Perth Glory – 2013, Adelaide United – 2015–16
- Leah Scarpelli – Brisbane Roar – 2023–24
- Marianna Seidl – Brisbane Roar – 2025–26
- Olivia Sekany – Brisbane Roar – 2024–25
- Kayla Sharples – Adelaide United – 2021–22
- Jordan Silkowitz – Brisbane Roar – 2023–24
- Alex Singer – Perth Glory – 2009–11
- Julianne Sitch – Melbourne Victory – 2009
- Abby Smith – Western Sydney Wanderers – 2019–20
- Taylor Smith – Newcastle Jets – 2018–19
- **Abby Smothers** – **Brisbane Roar** – 2026–
- Emily Sonnett – Sydney FC – 2017–18
- Jasmyne Spencer – Sydney FC – 2014–16, Canberra United – 2016–17, Melbourne City – 2018–19
- Sam Staab – Western Sydney Wanderers – 2019–20
- Nikki Stanton – Perth Glory – 2015–19
- Katie Stengel – Western Sydney Wanderers – 2016–17, Newcastle Jets – 2017–19, Canberra United – 2019–20
- **Josie Studer** – **Brisbane Roar** – 2025–
- Crystal Thomas – Perth Glory – 2019–20
- Jordan Thompson – Sydney FC – 2023–25
- **Allie Thornton** – **Newcastle Jets** – 2026–
- Erika Tymrak – Melbourne City – 2016–17
- Jodi Ülkekul – Sydney FC – 2025–26
- **Cameron Valladares** – **Newcastle Jets** – 2026–
- Lydia Vandenbergh – Central Coast Mariners – 2009, Sydney FC – 2011
- Gia Vicari – Newcastle Jets – 2024–25
- **Ellie Walker** – **Wellington Phoenix** – 2025–
- Jazmin Wardlow – Central Coast Mariners – 2023–24, Canberra United – 2025–26
- Chelsee Washington – Canberra United – 2021–22
- Nikki Washington – Canberra United – 2012–13
- Ally Watt – Melbourne City – 2020
- Dani Weatherholt – Melbourne Victory – 2018–19
- **Faith Webber** – **Sydney FC** – 2026–
- Mallory Weber – Adelaide United – 2019–21
- McKenzie Weinert – Melbourne Victory – 2023–24
- Kennedy White – Melbourne Victory – 2025–26
- Lynn Williams – Western Sydney Wanderers – 2019–20, Melbourne Victory – 2021–22
- Keelin Winters – Western Sydney Wanderers – 2014–16
- **Morgan Witz** – **Central Coast Mariners** – 2026–
- **Makala Woods** – **Wellington Phoenix** – 2026–
- Arin Wright – Newcastle Jets – 2016–19
- Kelsey Wys – Newcastle Jets – 2016–17
- **Bella Yakel** – **Adelaide United** – 2026–
- Beverly Yanez – Melbourne City – 2016–17
- Catherine Zimmerman – Melbourne Victory – 2020–23, Western United – 2023–25

== Venezuela ==
- Mariana Speckmaier – Wellington Phoenix – 2023–24, Melbourne City – 2024–25

== Wales ==
- Jess Fishlock – Melbourne Victory – 2012–14, Melbourne City – 2015–18
- Carys Hawkins – Perth Glory – 2008–14
- Laura Hughes – Canberra United – 2016–23, Melbourne City – 2023–26
- **Megan Wynne** – **Perth Glory** – 2024–

== See also ==
- W-League records and statistics

== Notes ==
1. Born in Australia
2. Born in Canada
3. Born in England
4. Born in the Netherlands
5. Born in Norway
6. Born in Spain
7. Born in Switzerland
8. Born in the United Arab Emirates
9. Born in the United States
10. Capped for the Australia women's national soccer team
11. Capped for the Australia women's national under-20 soccer team
12. Capped for the Australia women's national under-17 soccer team
13. Capped for the Canada women's national soccer team
14. Capped for the Honduras women's national under-20 football team
15. Capped for the Mexico women's national football team
16. Capped for the Mexico women's national under-20 football team
17. Capped for the Norway women's national under-23 football team
18. Capped for the United States women's national under-23 soccer team
