= 2025–26 Western Sydney Wanderers FC (women) season =

14th season in existence of Western Sydney Wanderers FC (women)

Western Sydney Wanderers
2025–26 season
- Owner: Paul Lederer, Jefferson Cheng, Glenn Duncan
- Chairman: Paul Lederer
- Manager: Geoff Abrahams
- Stadium: CommBank Stadium; Wanderers Football Park
- A-League Women: 11th
- A-League Women Finals: DNQ
- Top goalscorer: Talia Younis; Yuan Cong (3 goals each)
Home colours	Away colours
- All statistics correct as of 25 July 2025.

The 2025–26 season was the 14th in the history of Western Sydney Wanderers (women). The team finished the season in last position (11th of 11 teams).

== Players ==
=== First-team squad ===
As of 21 February 2026

Note: Flags indicate national team as defined under FIFA eligibility rules; some limited exceptions apply. Players may hold more than one non-FIFA nationality.

No.	Pos.	Nation	Player
2	DF	PHI	Janae DeFazio
3	DF	CHN	Wang Ying
4	DF	AUS	Poppie Hooks
5	MF	AUS	Milly Bennett
6	MF	AUS	Amy Chessari
7	MF	AUS	Amy Harrison (captain)
8	MF	AUS	Olivia Price
9	FW	KOR	Kim So-eun
10	FW	CHN	Yuan Cong
11	DF	AUS	Danika Matos
12	GK	NZL	Brianna Edwards
13	DF	AUS	Alvina Khoshaba
14	DF	AUS	Ella Buchanan
15	DF	AUS	Cushla Rue
16	FW	AUS	Anika Stajcic

No.	Pos.	Nation	Player
17	FW	AUS	Allyssa Ng-Saad
18	GK	AUS	Aimee Hall
19	MF	AUS	Talia Younis
20	GK	AUS	Sham Khamis
21	DF	AUS	Amy Barker
22	DF	AUS	Alana Cerne
23	FW	AUS	Miriam Zumaya
24	MF	AUS	Nikkita Fazzari
25	FW	AUS	Holly Caspers
26	MF	POR	Siena Arrarte (scholarship)
27	GK	AUS	Annabelle Croll
28	FW	AUS	Frida Karaberis
30	FW	NZL	Ava Collins (injury replacement)
37	MF	JPN	Ena Harada

== Transfers ==
=== Transfers in ===
No.	Position	Player	From	Type/fee	Contract length	Date	Ref
3	DF	(China) Wang Ying	(China) Guangdong	Free transfer	1 year	16 September 2025	
10	FW	(China) Yuan Cong	(China) Guangdong	Free transfer	1 year	16 September 2025	
4	DF	Poppie Hooks	(Australia) Illawarra Stingrays	Free transfer	1 year	23 September 2025	
12	GK	(New Zealand) Brianna Edwards	Unattached	Free transfer	2 years	1 October 2025	
2	DF	(Philippines) Janae DeFazio	Unattached	Free transfer	1 year	2 October 2025	
22	DF	Alana Cerne	Unattached	Free transfer	1 year	25 October 2025	
17	FW	Allyssa Ng-Saad	(Australia) Gladesville Ravens	Free transfer		28 October 2025	
9	FW	(South Korea) Kim So-eun	(South Korea) Incheon Hyundai Steel Red Angels	Free transfer	1 year	5 November 2025	
66	MF	Chloe Berryhill	(Italy) Como 1907	Free transfer	6 months	12 December 2025	
30	FW	(New Zealand) Ava Collins	(Australia) UNSW FC	Injury replacement	4 months	21 February 2026	

==== From academy squad ====
N	Pos.	Nat.	Name	Age	Notes
24	MF	(Australia)	Nikkita Fazzari	17	one-year contract
13	DF	(Australia)	Alvina Khoshaba	18	
21	DF	(Australia)	Amy Barker	17	
23	FW	(Australia)	Miriam Zumaya	17	
27	GK	(Australia)	Annabelle Croll	16	
28	FW	(Australia)	Frida Karaberis	14	

=== Transfers out ===
No.	Position	Player	Transferred to	Type/fee	Date	Ref
9	FW	Sophie Harding	(United States) Fort Lauderdale United	Mutual contract termination	26 June 2025	
17	FW	Amelia Cassar	Sydney FC	End of contract	4 July 2025	
4	DF	Madison McComasky	(United States) Fort Lauderdale United	End of contract	7 July 2025	
2	DF	Paige Hayward	Unattached	End of contract	8 July 2025	
3	DF	Gemma Ferris	Unattached	End of contract	8 July 2025	
10	MF	Sienna Saveska	Unattached	End of contract	8 July 2025	
12	FW	Bronte Trew	Unattached	End of contract	8 July 2025	
13	FW	Talia Kapetanellis	Unattached	End of contract	8 July 2025	
23	DF	Maya Lobo	Unattached	End of contract	8 July 2025	
24	FW	(Japan) Aya Seino	Unattached	End of contract	8 July 2025	
31	GK	Keely Segavcic	Unattached	End of contract	8 July 2025	
66	MF	Chloe Berryhill	Retired		24 January 2026	

=== Contract extensions ===
No.	Player	Position	Duration	Date	Ref.
6	Amy Chessari	Defensive midfielder	1 year	27 June 2025	
19	Talia Younis	Midfielder	1 year	30 June 2025	
37	(Japan) Ena Harada	Midfielder	1 year	4 July 2025	
5	Milly Bennett	Midfielder	2 years	8 July 2025	
26	(Portugal) Siena Arrarte	Midfielder		8 July 2025	

== Pre-season and friendlies ==
17 October 2025	Western Sydney Wanderers	0–0	Wellington Phoenix	Sydney
		Report

== Competitions ==
=== Overall record ===
Competition	First match	Last match	Final position	Record							
Competition	First match	Last match	Final position	Pld	W	D	L	GF	GA	GD	Win %
A-League Women	31 October 2025	29 March 2026	11th	20	5	4	11	18	34	−16	25.00
Total				20	5	4	11	18	34	−16	25.00

Last updated: 29 March 2026
Source: Competitions

=== A-League Women ===
==== League table ====
Pos	Team	Pld	W	D	L	GF	GA	GD	Pts
7	Central Coast Mariners	20	7	7	6	27	26	+1	28
8	Perth Glory	20	7	3	10	20	30	−10	24
9	Newcastle Jets	20	7	2	11	30	36	−6	23
10	Sydney FC	20	4	7	9	18	29	−11	19
11	Western Sydney Wanderers	20	5	4	11	18	34	−16	19

Source: A-Leagues
Rules for classification: 1) points; 2) goal difference; 3) goals scored; 4) wins; 5) head-to-head results; 5a) head-to-head points; 5b) head-to-head goal difference; 6) Fair Play points; 7) away goal difference; 8) away goals per match; 9) home goal difference; 10) home goals per match; 11) toss of a coin in an event of a tie of two clubs.

==== Matches ====
Win Draw Loss

31 October 2025 1	Western Sydney Wanderers	1–3	Perth Glory	Sydney
20:15 AEDT	Buchanan 51'	Report	Hollar 28', 52'; Badawiya 47'	Stadium: Wanderers Football Park; Attendance: 957; Referee: Isabella Mossin
Note: Due to lightning delays, the kickoff was delayed to 20:15.

9 November 2025 2	Western Sydney Wanderers	1–4	Melbourne Victory	Sydney
16:00 AEDT	Matos 13'	Report	White 41', 45+1', 48'; McMeeken 83'	Stadium: Wanderers Football Park; Attendance: 986; Referee: Abbie Hendry

16 November 2025 3	Brisbane Roar	0–1	Western Sydney Wanderers	Brisbane
15:00 AEST		Report	Price 88'	Stadium: Imperial Corp Stadium; Attendance: 1,489; Referee: Mikayla Ryan

22 November 2025 4	Newcastle Jets	1–0	Western Sydney Wanderers	Newcastle
15:00 AEDT	L. Allan 26'	Report		Stadium: No.2 Sportsground; Attendance: 1,413; Referee: Molly Godsell

7 December 2025 6	Western Sydney Wanderers	0–0	Sydney FC	Sydney
17:00 AEDT		Report		Stadium: Marconi Stadium; Attendance: 1,348; Referee: Isabella Mossin

14 December 2025 7	Western Sydney Wanderers	1–2	Central Coast Mariners	Sydney
19:00 AEDT	Younis 90'	Report	Coco-Di Sipio 18'; Gomez 28'	Stadium: Wanderers Football Park; Attendance: 932; Referee: Bec Mackie
Note: The match was delayed by two hours due to forecasted heat.

27 December 2025 9	Adelaide United	5–2	Western Sydney Wanderers	Adelaide
16:20 ACDT	E. Hodgson 22'; Zois 35'; Healy 49', 86'; Dawber 68'	Report	Ng-Saad 48'; Berryhill 75'	Stadium: Coopers Stadium; Attendance: 5,781; Referee: Izzy Cooper

30 December 2025 10	Western Sydney Wanderers	0–3	Wellington Phoenix	Sydney
19:00 AEDT		Report	Main 7', 52'; Bhandari 48'	Stadium: Wanderers Football Park; Referee: Georgia Ghirardello

3 January 2026 11	Western Sydney Wanderers	1–1	Canberra United	Sydney
17:00 AEDT	Bennett 70'	Report	Anton 9'	Stadium: Wanderers Football Park; Attendance: 608; Referee: Page Malau-Aduli

9 January 2026 12	Perth Glory	3–1	Western Sydney Wanderers	Perth
19:00 AWST	Tovar 29'; Phonsongkham 44'; Lincoln 84'	Report	Yuan 75'	Stadium: Sam Kerr Football Centre; Attendance: 879; Referee: Rachael Mitchenson

16 January 2026 13	Western Sydney Wanderers	1–1	Brisbane Roar	Sydney
19:00 AEDT	Buchanan 83'	Report	Jansen 90+5'	Stadium: Wanderers Football Park; Attendance: 715; Referee: Lara Christie Lee

24 January 2026 14	Central Coast Mariners	1–2	Western Sydney Wanderers	Gosford
17:00 AEDT	Rasmussen 41'	Report	Caspers 35', 57'	Stadium: polytec Stadium; Attendance: 1,248; Referee: Caitlin Williams

31 January 2026 15	Sydney FC	2–3	Western Sydney Wanderers	Sydney
17:00 AEDT	Tanner 7'; Luchtmeijer 84'	Report	Chessari 48'; Ng-Saad 60'; Yuan 70'	Stadium: Allianz Stadium; Attendance: 4,805; Referee: Isabella Mossin

4 February 2026 5	Melbourne City	0–1	Western Sydney Wanderers	Melbourne
17:30 AEDT		Report	Keane 35' (o.g.)	Stadium: ctrl:cyber Pitch; Attendance: 520; Referee: Caitlin Williams

8 February 2026 16	Western Sydney Wanderers	0–1	Adelaide United	Sydney
19:00 AEDT		Report	Matos 59' (o.g.)	Stadium: CommBank Stadium; Attendance: 683; Referee: Rachael Mitchenson

13 February 2026 17	Western Sydney Wanderers	1–1	Newcastle Jets	Sydney
16:50 AEDT	Younis 1'	Report	Ayres 78'	Stadium: CommBank Stadium; Attendance: 1,028; Referee: Shab Roshan

21 February 2026 18	Canberra United	3–0	Western Sydney Wanderers	Canberra
17:00 AEDT	Aulicino 11', 66'; Heyman 75'	Report		Stadium: McKellar Park; Attendance: 1,000; Referee: Mia Velarde

14 March 2026 19	Melbourne Victory	1–0	Western Sydney Wanderers	Melbourne
18:00 AEDT	Furphy 57'	Report		Stadium: Home of the Matildas; Attendance: 901; Referee: Sophie Allum

22 March 2026 20	Western Sydney Wanderers	1–2	Melbourne City	Sydney
16:00 AEDT	Younis 53'	Report	McKenna 24'; Henry 45'	Stadium: Wanderers Football Park; Attendance: 682; Referee: Izzy Cooper

29 March 2026 21	Wellington Phoenix	0–1	Western Sydney Wanderers	Porirua
15:00 NZDT		Report	Yuan 78'	Stadium: Porirua Park; Attendance: 1,756; Referee: Mikayla Ryan

== Statistics ==
=== Appearances and goals ===
Includes all competitions. Players with no appearances not included in the list.

As of match played 29 March 2026

No.	Pos	Nat	Player	Total		A-League Women	
No.	Pos	Nat	Player	Apps	Goals	Apps	Goals
2	DF	(Philippines) PHI	Janae DeFazio	3	0	0+3	0
3	DF	(China) CHN	Wang Ying	14	0	11+3	0
4	DF	(Australia) AUS	Poppie Hooks	19	0	15+4	0
5	MF	(Australia) AUS	Milly Bennett	10	1	5+5	1
6	MF	(Australia) AUS	Amy Chessari	20	1	19+1	1
7	MF	(Australia) AUS	Amy Harrison	20	0	20	0
8	MF	(Australia) AUS	Olivia Price	10	1	4+6	1
9	FW	(South Korea) KOR	Kim So-eun	10	0	6+4	0
10	FW	(China) CHN	Yuan Cong	15	3	10+5	3
11	DF	(Australia) AUS	Danika Matos	20	1	20	1
12	GK	(New Zealand) NZL	Brianna Edwards	1	0	1	0
13	DF	(Australia) AUS	Alvina Khoshaba	6	0	1+5	0
14	DF	(Australia) AUS	Ella Buchanan	20	2	17+3	2
15	DF	(Australia) AUS	Cushla Rue	6	0	0+6	0
16	FW	(Australia) AUS	Anika Stajcic	1	0	0+1	0
17	MF	(Australia) AUS	Allyssa Ng-Saad	17	2	9+8	2
19	MF	(Australia) AUS	Talia Younis	17	3	13+4	3
20	GK	(Australia) AUS	Sham Khamis	19	0	19	0
21	DF	(Australia) AUS	Amy Barker	4	0	1+3	0
22	DF	(Australia) AUS	Alana Cerne	16	0	14+2	0
23	FW	(Australia) AUS	Miriam Zumaya	4	0	0+4	0
24	MF	(Australia) AUS	Nikkita Fazzari	11	0	1+10	0
25	FW	(Australia) AUS	Holly Caspers	12	2	8+4	2
30	FW	(New Zealand) NZL	Ava Collins	4	0	3+1	0
37	MF	(Japan) JPN	Ena Harada	20	0	17+3	0
Player(s) transferred out but featured this season
66	MF	(Australia) AUS	Chloe Berryhill	6	1	6	1

=== Clean sheets ===
Includes all competitions. The list is sorted by squad number when total clean sheets are equal. Numbers in parentheses represent games where both goalkeepers participated and both kept a clean sheet; the number in parentheses is awarded to the goalkeeper who was substituted on, whilst a full clean sheet is awarded to the goalkeeper who was on the field at the start of play. Goalkeepers with no clean sheets not included in the list.

As of match played 29 March 2026

Rank	No.	Nat.	Goalkeeper	A-League Women	Total
1	20	(Australia)	Sham Khamis	4	4

== See also ==
- 2025–26 Western Sydney Wanderers FC season
