= 2026–27 Western Sydney Wanderers FC (women) season =

15th season in existence of Western Sydney Wanderers FC (women)

Western Sydney Wanderers
2026–27 season
- Owner: Paul Lederer, Jefferson Cheng, Glenn Duncan
- Chairman: Paul Lederer
- Manager: Geoff Abrahams
- Stadium: CommBank Stadium; Wanderers Football Park
- A-League Women: TBD
Home colours	Away colours
- All statistics correct as of 26 July 2026.

The 2026–27 season is the 15th in the history of Western Sydney Wanderers (A-League Women).

== Players ==
=== First-team squad ===
As of 14 October 2026

Note: Flags indicate national team as defined under FIFA eligibility rules; some limited exceptions apply. Players may hold more than one non-FIFA nationality.

No.	Pos.	Nation	Player
1	GK	AUS	Sarah Langman
2	DF	LBN	Tiana Jaber (vice-captain)
3	DF	AUS	Tegan Bertolissio
4	DF	NOR	Silje Bjørneboe (on loan from Stabæk)
5	MF	AUS	Milly Bennett
6	MF	AUS	Isabella Chidiac
7	MF	GER	Samantha Iredale
8	MF	AUS	Sofia Sakalis
9	FW	COL	Elexa Bahr
10	MF	AUS	Rhianna Pollicina (captain)
11	FW	USA	Brooke Miller
12	GK	NZL	Brianna Edwards
13	DF	AUS	Alvina Khoshaba
15	DF	AUS	Sofia Palywoda

No.	Pos.	Nation	Player
16	MF	AUS	Estelle Fragale
17	FW	AUS	Allyssa Ng-Saad
18	GK	AUS	Aimee Hall
19	MF	AUS	Talia Younis
21	DF	AUS	Laura Pickett
22	MF	PHI	Carleigh Frilles
23	FW	AUS	Miriam Zumaya (scholarship)
24	MF	AUS	Nikkita Fazzari
25	FW	AUS	Holly Caspers
28	FW	AUS	Frida Karaberis
34	MF	AUS	Ruby Betro
—	DF	AUS	Charlotte Bradshaw
—	GK	AUS	Charlotte Church
—	GK	AUS	Sofia Fante

== Transfers ==
=== Transfers in ===
No.	Position	Player	From	Type/fee	Contract length	Date	Ref
2	DF	(Lebanon) Tiana Jaber	Wellington Phoenix	Free transfer	1 year	4 August 2026	
3	DF	Tegan Bertolissio	Canberra United	Free transfer	2 years	6 August 2026	
7	MF	(Germany) Samantha Iredale	Unattached	Free transfer	1 year	13 August 2026	
11	FW	(United States) Brooke Miller	Unattached	Free transfer	1 year	22 August 2026	
1	GK	Sarah Langman	Central Coast Mariners	Free transfer	1 year	27 August 2026	
10	MF	Rhianna Pollicina	Melbourne Victory	Free transfer	1 year	1 September 2026	
4	DF	(Norway) Silje Bjørneboe	(Norway) Stabæk	Loan	1 year	7 September 2026	
16	MF	Estelle Fragale	(Australia) APIA Leichhardt	Free transfer	1 year	10 September 2026	
6	MF	Isabella Chidiac	Unattached	Free transfer	1 year	11 September 2026	
22	MF	(Philippines) Carleigh Frilles	Unattached	Free transfer	1 year	18 September 2026	
8	MF	Sofia Sakalis	Unattached	Free transfer	1 year	23 September 2026	
15	DF	Sofia Palywoda	(Australia) Box Hill United	Free transfer	1 year	24 September 2026	
9	FW	(Colombia) Elexa Bahr	Unattached	Free transfer	1 year	26 September 2026	
21	DF	Laura Pickett	Unattached	Free transfer	1 year	12 October 2026	
TBA	GK	Sofia Fante	Sydney FC	Free transfer	1 year	14 October 2026	

==== From academy squad ====
N	Pos.	Nat.	Name	Age	Notes
34	MF	(Australia)	Ruby Betro	16	
	DF	(Australia)	Charlotte Bradshaw	17	
	GK	(Australia)	Charlotte Church		

=== Transfers out ===
No.	Position	Player	Transferred to	Type/fee	Date	Ref
21	DF	Amy Barker	(Japan) Cerezo Osaka	End of contract	24 June 2026	
2	DF	(Philippines) Janae DeFazio	Unattached	End of contract	24 July 2026	
4	DF	Poppie Hooks	Unattached	End of contract	24 July 2026	
6	MF	Amy Chessari	Sydney FC	End of contract	24 July 2026	
9	FW	(South Korea) Kim So-eun	Unattached	End of contract	24 July 2026	
10	FW	(China) Yuan Cong	Unattached	End of contract	24 July 2026	
14	DF	Ella Buchanan	Unattached	End of contract	24 July 2026	
15	DF	Cushla Rue	Unattached	End of contract	24 July 2026	
16	FW	Anika Stajcic	Unattached	End of contract	24 July 2026	
26	MF	(Portugal) Siena Arrarte	Unattached	End of contract	24 July 2026	
37	MF	(Japan) Ena Harada	Unattached	End of contract	24 July 2026	
20	GK	Sham Khamis	Unattached	End of contract	7 August 2026	
3	FW	(China) Wang Ying	Unattached	End of contract	24 August 2026	
7	MF	Amy Harrison	Unattached	End of contract	24 August 2026	
11	DF	Danika Matos	Unattached	End of contract	24 August 2026	
22	DF	Alana Cerne	Unattached	End of contract	24 August 2026	
30	FW	(New Zealand) Ava Collins	Unattached	End of contract	24 August 2026	
8	MF	Olivia Price	Unattached	End of contract	1 September 2026	
27	GK	Annabelle Croll	Sydney FC	Mutual contract termination	3 September 2026	

=== Contract extensions ===
No.	Player	Position	Duration	Date	Ref.
23	Miriam Zumaya	Forward	2 years	24 April 2026	
17	Allyssa Ng-Saad	Forward	2 years	6 May 2026	
28	Frida Karaberis	Forward	3 years	11 May 2026	
13	Alvina Khoshaba	Left-back	2 years	13 May 2026	
19	Talia Younis	Midfielder	1 year	14 May 2026	
27	Annabelle Croll	Goalkeeper		31 August 2026	
24	Nikkita Fazzari	Midfielder		16 October 2026	

== Pre-season and friendlies ==
29 September 2026	Western Sydney Wanderers (Australia)	0–1	(New Zealand) Wellington Phoenix	Sydney, Australia
		Report	Benson	Attendance: 0 (behind closed doors)
Note: Match was played over three 30-minute periods

== Competitions ==
=== Overall record ===
Competition	First match	Last match	Record							
Competition	First match	Last match	Pld	W	D	L	GF	GA	GD	Win %
A-League Women	17 October 2026	TBD	2	1	0	1	3	2	+1	50.00
Total			2	1	0	1	3	2	+1	50.00

Last updated: 24 October 2026
Source: Competitions

=== A-League Women ===
==== League table ====
Pos	Team	Pld	W	D	L	GF	GA	GD	Pts	Qualification
3	Melbourne Victory	4	2	1	1	3	3	0	7	Qualification for Finals series
4	Melbourne City	2	2	0	0	7	1	+6	6	Qualification for Finals series
5	Western Sydney Wanderers	3	2	0	1	5	2	+3	6	Qualification for Finals series
6	Wellington Phoenix (Note: Wellington Phoenix cannot qualify for the AFC Women's Champions League as they are based in New Zealand, which is part of the Oceania Football Confederation.)	4	1	1	2	4	5	−1	4	Qualification for Finals series
7	Sydney FC	3	1	1	1	3	7	−4	4	

Updated to match(es) played on 7 November 2026. Source: A-Leagues
Rules for classification: 1) points; 2) goal difference; 3) goals scored; 4) wins; 5) head-to-head results; 5a) head-to-head points; 5b) head-to-head goal difference; 6) Fair Play points; 7) away goal difference; 8) away goals per match; 9) home goal difference; 10) home goals per match; 11) toss of a coin in an event of a tie of two clubs.

==== Results summary ====
Overall								Home						Away					
Pld	W	D	L	GF	GA	GD	Pts	W	D	L	GF	GA	GD	W	D	L	GF	GA	GD
0	0	0	0	0	0	0	0	0	0	0	0	0	0	0	0	0	0	0	0

Last updated: 18 October 2026.
Source: A-Leagues

==== Results by round ====
Round	1	2	3	4	5	6	7	8	9	10	11	12	13	14	15	16	17	18	19	20	21	22
Ground	H	H	A	A	B	H	H	A	H	H	B	A	A	H	A	H	A	A	H	A	A	H
Result	L	W	W	P	B						B											
Position																						

Updated to match(es) played on 18 October 2026. Source: A-Leagues
A = Away; H = Home; B = Bye; W = Win; D = Draw; L = Loss; P = Postponed

==== Matches ====
The league fixtures were released on 21 August 2026.

Win Draw Loss Fixtures

17 October 2026 1	Western Sydney Wanderers	0–1	Melbourne Victory	Sydney
15:00 AEDT		Report	Jančevski 32'	Stadium: Blacktown International Sportspark

24 October 2026 2	Western Sydney Wanderers	3–1	Brisbane Roar	Sydney
14:15 AEDT	Palywoda 15'; Younis 66' (pen.); Miller 80'	Report	Sakalis 7' (o.g.)	Stadium: CommBank Stadium; Attendance: 1,824; Referee: Charles Hollings

1 November 2026 3	Canberra United	0–2	Western Sydney Wanderers	Canberra
15:00 AEDT		Report	Bennett 1'; Bahr 19'	Stadium: McKellar Park

20 November 2026 6	Western Sydney Wanderers	v	Wellington Phoenix	Sydney
16:50 AEDT				Stadium: CommBank Stadium

11 December 2026 7	Western Sydney Wanderers	v	Newcastle Jets	Sydney
19:00 AEDT		Report		Stadium: Wanderers Football Park

19 December 2026 8	Perth Glory	v	Western Sydney Wanderers	Perth
17:00 AWST		Report		Stadium: Sam Kerr Football Centre

28 December 2026 9	Western Sydney Wanderers	v	Canberra United	Sydney
17:00 AEDT		Report		Stadium: Wanderers Football Park

2 January 2027 10	Western Sydney Wanderers	v	Adelaide United	Sydney
18:00 AEDT				Stadium: Wanderers Football Park

6 January 2027 4	Melbourne City	v	Western Sydney Wanderers	Melbourne
17:50 AEDT		Report		Stadium: ctrl:cyber Pitch

9 January 2027 11	Melbourne Victory	v	Western Sydney Wanderers	Melbourne
17:00 AEDT		Report		Stadium: Home of the Matildas

23 January 2027 13	Central Coast Mariners	v	Western Sydney Wanderers	Gosford
17:00 AEDT				Stadium: polytech Stadium

30 January 2027 14	Western Sydney Wanderers	v	Sydney FC	Sydney
16:50 AEDT		Report		Stadium: CommBank Stadium

6 February 2027 15	Wellington Phoenix	v	Western Sydney Wanderers	Christchurch
TBC NZDT				Stadium: One New Zealand Stadium

13 February 2027 16	Western Sydney Wanderers	v	Melbourne City	Sydney
18:00 AEDT		Report		Stadium: Wanderers Football Park

20 February 2027 17	Brisbane Roar	v	Western Sydney Wanderers	Brisbane
17:00 AEST				Stadium: Gioca Stadium

13 March 2027 18	Adelaide United	v	Western Sydney Wanderers	Adelaide
16:30 ACDT				Stadium: Coopers Stadium

20 March 2027 19	Western Sydney Wanderers	v	Perth Glory	Sydney
14:15 AEDT		Report		Stadium: TBC

28 March 2027 20	Newcastle Jets	v	Western Sydney Wanderers	Weston
15:00 AEDT		Report		Stadium: Hunter City Motor Group Stadium

4 April 2027 21	Sydney FC	v	Western Sydney Wanderers	Wollongong
14:00 AEDT		Report		Stadium: WIN Stadium

11 April 2027 22	Western Sydney Wanderers	v	Central Coast Mariners	Sydney
14:15 AEDT				Stadium: TBC

== See also ==
- 2026–27 Western Sydney Wanderers FC season
