= 2025–26 Canberra United FC (women) season =

18th season in existence of Canberra United FC

Canberra United
2025–26 season
- Chairman: Kate Lundy
- Manager: Antoni Jagarinec
- Stadium: McKellar Park
- A-League Women: 3rd
- A-League Women Finals: Elimination-final
- Top goalscorer: League: Michelle Heyman (6); All: Michelle Heyman (6)
- All statistics correct as of 7 September 2025.

The 2025–26 season was Canberra United Football Club's 18th season in the A-League Women.

== Players ==
=== First-team squad ===
As of 21 November 2025

Note: Flags indicate national team as defined under FIFA eligibility rules; some limited exceptions apply. Players may hold more than one non-FIFA nationality.

No.	Pos.	Nation	Player
1	GK	AUS	Sally James
2	DF	AUS	Alex McKenzie
3	DF	NZL	Elizabeth Anton
5	DF	USA	Jazmin Wardlow
6	MF	USA	Josie Aulicino
7	FW	USA	Emma Hawkins
8	DF	AUS	Sasha Grove
9	FW	AUS	Kiara De Domizio
10	MF	SRB	Mary Stanić-Floody
11	MF	AUS	Emma Robers
12	DF	AUS	Hayley Taylor-Young
13	FW	AUS	Sofia Christopherson

No.	Pos.	Nation	Player
16	FW	AUS	Keira Bobbin
18	GK	AUS	Coco Majstorovic
19	FW	AUS	Sienna Dale
20	FW	AUS	Lillian Skelly
23	FW	AUS	Michelle Heyman (captain)
25	MF	AUS	Darcey Malone
26	GK	AUS	Janet King
27	GK	AUS	Eliza Evans
28	DF	AUS	Tegan Bertolissio
32	MF	AUS	Bethany Gordon
33	MF	JPN	Nanako Sasaki
44	MF	AUS	Ava Briedis

== Transfers ==
=== Transfers in ===
No.	Position	Player	From	Type/fee	Contract length	Date	Ref
33	MF	(Japan) Nanako Sasaki	Unattached	Free transfer	1 year	4 September 2025	
7	FW	(United States) Emma Hawkins	Unattached	Free transfer	1 year	5 September 2025	
9	FW	Kiara De Domizio	Unattached	Free transfer	1 year	11 September 2025	
6	MF	(United States) Josie Aulicino	(Australia) Box Hill United	Free transfer	1 year	12 September 2025	
8	DF	Sasha Grove	Unattached	Free transfer	1 year	16 September 2025	
5	DF	(United States) Jazmin Wardlow	(Turkey) Galatasaray	Free transfer	1 year	17 September 2025	
27	GK	Eliza Evans	(Australia) Souths United	Free transfer	1 year	26 September 2025	
19'	FW	Sienna Dale	(Australia) Manly United	Free transfer	1 year	29 September 2025	
44	MF	Ava Briedis	Unattached	Free transfer	1 year	2 October 2025	
16	FW	Keira Bobbin	(Australia) Belconnen United	Free transfer	1 year	31 October 2025	
3	DF	(New Zealand) Elizabeth Anton	(Norway) Kolbotn	Free transfer	7 months	21 November 2025	

=== Transfers out ===
No.	Position	Player	Transferred to	Type/fee	Date	Ref
8	MF	Tianah Miro	(Australia) Canberra Olympic	End of contract	12 May 2025	
6	DF	Ivana Galic	Unattached	End of contract	30 June 2025	
9	FW	(New Zealand) Ruby Nathan	(New Zealand) Eastern Suburbs	End of contract	3 August 2025	
5	DF	(Philippines) Madison Ayson	Sydney FC	End of contract	22 August 2025	
21	FW	Aideen Keane	Melbourne City	End of contract	25 August 2025	
24	GK	Georgia Ritchie	Newcastle Jets	End of contract	1 September 2025	
4	MF	Holly Murray	Adelaide United	End of contract	2 September 2025	
7	FW	Jynaya dos Santos	Central Coast Mariners	End of contract	28 October 2025	
19	MF	Jaya Bowman	Central Coast Mariners	End of contract	28 October 2025	
17	FW	Maja Markovski	Unattached	End of contract	30 September 2025	

=== Contract extensions ===
No.	Player	Position	Duration	Date	Ref.
23	Michelle Heyman	Forward	1 year	18 August 2025	
11	Emma Robers	Midfielder	1 year	20 August 2025	
25	Darcey Malone	Midfielder	1 year	20 August 2025	
28	Tegan Bertolissio	Defender	1 year	20 August 2025	
32	Bethany Gordon	Midfielder	1 year	20 August 2025	
1	Sally James	Goalkeeper	1 year	26 August 2025	
10	(Serbia) Mary Stanić-Floody	Midfielder	1 year	26 August 2025	
12	Hayley Taylor-Young	Defender	1 year	26 August 2025	
18	Coco Majstorovic	Goalkeeper	1 year	26 August 2025	
26	Janet King	Goalkeeper	1 year	26 September 2025	
2	Alex McKenzie	Defender	1 year	17 October 2025	
13	Sofia Christopherson	Forward	1 year	1 November 2025	
20	Lillian Skelly	Forward	1 year	1 November 2025	

== Pre-season and friendlies ==
18 October 2025	Canberra United (Australia)	2–0	(Australia) E.S.S All-Stars	Canberra, Australia
15:00 AEDT	Hawkins 11'; Bobbin 78'	Report		Stadium: McKellar Park

== Competitions ==
=== Overall record ===
Competition	First match	Last match	Final position	Record							
Competition	First match	Last match	Final position	Pld	W	D	L	GF	GA	GD	Win %
A-League Women	2 November 2025	4 April 2026	3rd	20	9	4	7	30	24	+6	45.00
A-League Women Finals	25 April 2026	25 April 2026	Elimination-final	1	0	0	1	1	3	−2	0.00
Total				21	9	4	8	31	27	+4	42.86

Last updated: 25 April 2026
Source: Competitions

=== A-League Women ===
==== League table ====
Pos	Team	Pld	W	D	L	GF	GA	GD	Pts	Qualification
1	Melbourne City (C)	20	12	4	4	36	20	+16	40	Qualification for AFC Women's Champions League and Finals series
2	Wellington Phoenix (Note: Wellington Phoenix cannot qualify for the AFC Women's Champions League as they are based in New Zealand, which is part of the Oceania Football Confederation.)	20	10	4	6	38	17	+21	34	Qualification for Finals series
3	Canberra United	20	9	4	7	30	24	+6	31	Qualification for Finals series
4	Brisbane Roar	20	9	4	7	37	39	−2	31	Qualification for Finals series
5	Adelaide United	20	9	3	8	24	26	−2	30	Qualification for Finals series

Source: A-Leagues
Rules for classification: 1) points; 2) goal difference; 3) goals scored; 4) wins; 5) head-to-head results; 5a) head-to-head points; 5b) head-to-head goal difference; 6) Fair Play points; 7) away goal difference; 8) away goals per match; 9) home goal difference; 10) home goals per match; 11) toss of a coin in an event of a tie of two clubs.
(C) Champions

==== Matches ====
Win Draw Loss

2 November 2025 1	Canberra United	1–2	Newcastle Jets	Canberra
16:00 AEDT	Heyman 14'	Report	Lancaster 33'; Breier 89'	Stadium: McKellar Park; Attendance: 1,248; Referee: Georgia Ghirardello

8 November 2025 2	Wellington Phoenix	1–1	Canberra United	Wellington
16:00 NZDT	Van der Meer 39'	Report	Aulicino 18'	Stadium: Sky Stadium; Attendance: 4,655; Referee: Sarah Jones

14 November 2025 3	Adelaide United	2–1	Canberra United	Adelaide
18:30 ACDT	Condon 24'; McNamara 78'	Report	De Domizio 1'	Stadium: Service FM Stadium; Attendance: 737; Referee: Bec Mackie

22 November 2025 4	Canberra United	3–0	Perth Glory	Canberra
16:00 AEDT	Heyman 3'; Robers 8'; Gordon 57'	Report		Stadium: McKellar Park; Attendance: 845; Referee: Rachael Mitchenson

5 December 2025 6	Melbourne Victory	1–3	Canberra United	Melbourne
19:00 AEDT	Robers 4' (o.g.)	Report	Sasaki 22'; Grove 55'; Morrison 77' (o.g.)	Stadium: Home of the Matildas; Attendance: 782; Referee: Rachel Mitchenson

10 December 2025 5	Canberra United	2–0	Sydney FC	Canberra
17:00 AEDT	Heyman 53'; Dale 65'	Report		Stadium: McKellar Park; Referee: Georgia Ghirardello
Note: The match was rescheduled due to Sydney FC having seven players called-up for international duty.

13 December 2025 7	Canberra United	2–1	Melbourne City	Canberra
17:30 AEDT	Hawkins 52'; Heyman 59'	Report	McNamara 71' (pen.)	Stadium: McKellar Park; Attendance: 978; Referee: Jock Quartermain

20 December 2025 8	Canberra United	1–1	Central Coast Mariners	Canberra
17:30 AEDT	Grove 90'	Report	Rasmussen 67'	Stadium: McKellar Park; Attendance: 1,152; Referee: Isabella Mossin

27 December 2025 9	Newcastle Jets	0–1	Canberra United	Newcastle
18:00 AEDT		Report	Dale 90+3'	Stadium: No.2 Sportsground; Attendance: 1,614; Referee: Molly Godsell

3 January 2026 11	Western Sydney Wanderers	1–1	Canberra United	Sydney
17:00 AEDT	Bennett 70'	Report	Anton 9'	Stadium: Wanderers Football Park; Attendance: 608; Referee: Page Malau-Aduli

17 January 2026 13	Canberra United	0–2	Wellington Phoenix	Canberra
17:30 AEDT		Report	Benson 86'; Vlok 90+6'	Stadium: McKellar Park; Attendance: 1,415; Referee: Georgia Ghirardello

23 January 2026 14	Brisbane Roar	3–1	Canberra United	Brisbane
18:00 AEST	Brown 45'; Freier 66'; Jansen 89'	Report	Christopherson 13'	Stadium: Imperial Corp Stadium; Attendance: 955; Referee: Rebecca Durcau

1 February 2026 15	Canberra United	3–1	Melbourne Victory	Canberra
14:00 AEDT	Grove 62'; Stanić-Floody 64'; Bertolissio 75'	Report	White 49'	Stadium: McKellar Park; Referee: Bec Mackie
Note: Due to an extreme heat forecast, the match was postponed by a day from its original date, 31 January 2026.

8 February 2026 16	Sydney FC	1–2	Canberra United	Sydney
17:00 AEDT	Ayson 38'	Report	Gordon 13'; Stanić-Floody 86'	Stadium: Leichhardt Oval; Attendance: 1,347; Referee: Mikayla Ryan

14 February 2026 17	Perth Glory	1–0	Canberra United	Perth
17:00 AWST	Taylor-Young 80' (o.g.)	Report		Stadium: Sam Kerr Football Centre; Attendance: 849; Referee: Isabella Mossin

21 February 2026 18	Canberra United	3–0	Western Sydney Wanderers	Canberra
16:30 AEDT	Aulicino 11', 66'; Heyman 75'	Report		Stadium: McKellar Park; Attendance: 1,000; Referee: Mia Velarde

15 March 2026 19	Melbourne City	3–1	Canberra United	Melbourne
14:00 AEDT	Keane 61'; Uchendu 83', 87'	Report	Gordon 85'	Stadium: ctrl:cyber Pitch; Attendance: 595; Referee: Isabella Mossin

22 March 2026 20	Canberra United	3–2	Adelaide United	Canberra
14:00 AEDT	Gordon 10'; McNamara 69' (o.g.); Hawkins 77'	Report	Morgan 27'; Dewey 90+1'	Stadium: McKellar Park; Attendance: 1,066; Referee: Isabella Mossin

29 March 2026 21	Central Coast Mariners	0–0	Canberra United	Gosford
16:00 AEDT		Report		Stadium: polytec Stadium; Attendance: 1,037; Referee: Bec Mackie

4 April 2026 22	Canberra United	1–2	Brisbane Roar	Canberra
14:00 AEST	Heyman 62'	Report	Medwin 21'; Woods 68'	Stadium: McKellar Park; Attendance: 1,934; Referee: Isabella Mossin

==== Finals series ====
25 April 2026 Elimination-final	Canberra United	1–3	Melbourne Victory	Canberra
14:00 AEST	Grove 29'	Report	Lowe 21'; O'Grady 24', 51'	Stadium: McKellar Park; Attendance: 3,290; Referee: Caitlin Williams

== Statistics ==
=== Appearances and goals ===
Includes all competitions. Players with no appearances not included in the list.

As of match played 25 April 2026

No.	Pos	Nat	Player	Total		A-League Women		A-League Women Finals	
No.	Pos	Nat	Player	Apps	Goals	Apps	Goals	Apps	Goals
1	GK	(Australia) AUS	Sally James	21	0	20	0	1	0
2	DF	(Australia) AUS	Alex McKenzie	6	0	1+5	0	0	0
3	DF	(New Zealand) NZL	Elizabeth Anton	18	1	17	1	1	0
5	DF	(United States) USA	Jazmin Wardlow	15	0	5+9	0	0+1	0
6	MF	(United States) USA	Josie Aulicino	21	3	20	3	1	0
7	FW	(United States) USA	Emma Hawkins	20	2	11+8	2	1	0
8	DF	(Australia) AUS	Sasha Grove	21	4	18+2	3	1	1
9	FW	(Australia) AUS	Kiara De Domizio	7	1	2+5	1	0	0
10	MF	(Serbia) SRB	Mary Stanić-Floody	18	2	2+15	2	0+1	0
11	MF	(Australia) AUS	Emma Robers	21	1	18+2	1	1	0
12	DF	(Australia) AUS	Hayley Taylor-Young	21	0	20	0	1	0
13	FW	(Australia) AUS	Sofia Christopherson	17	1	6+10	1	0+1	0
16	FW	(Australia) AUS	Keira Bobbin	4	0	0+4	0	0	0
19	FW	(Australia) AUS	Sienna Dale	15	2	3+11	2	0+1	0
20	FW	(Australia) AUS	Lillian Skelly	3	0	0+3	0	0	0
23	FW	(Australia) AUS	Michelle Heyman	19	6	18	6	1	0
25	MF	(Australia) AUS	Darcey Malone	18	0	7+10	0	0+1	0
28	DF	(Australia) AUS	Tegan Bertolissio	17	1	15+1	1	1	0
32	MF	(Australia) AUS	Bethany Gordon	20	4	19	4	1	0
33	MF	(Japan) JPN	Nanako Sasaki	19	1	18	1	1	0
44	MF	(Australia) AUS	Ava Briedis	2	0	0+2	0	0	0

=== Clean sheets ===
Includes all competitions. The list is sorted by squad number when total clean sheets are equal. Numbers in parentheses represent games where both goalkeepers participated and both kept a clean sheet; the number in parentheses is awarded to the goalkeeper who was substituted on, whilst a full clean sheet is awarded to the goalkeeper who was on the field at the start of play. Goalkeepers with no clean sheets not included in the list.

As of match played 25 April 2026

Rank	No.	Nat.	Goalkeeper	A-League Women	A-League Women Finals	Total
1	1	(Australia)	Sally James	5	0	5
