= So-eun =

- Hangul: 소은
- RR: Soeun
- MR: Soŭn

So-eun (Korean: 소은) is a Korean given name. As of 2026, the name ranked 9,304th out of 36,179 male names and 64th out of 28,726 female names. A total of 9,250 people, consisting of 4 males and 9,246 females, were born with the name from 2008 to 2026.

Notable people with the name include:

- Park Eun-ji, stage name Han So-eun, South Korean actress
- Kim So-eun, South Korean actress
- Kim So-eun (footballer), South Korean professional footballer
- Park So-eun, South Korean idol and member of K-pop girl group Weeekly
- Sun So-eun, South Korean former swimmer
- Im So-eun, stage name NC.A, South Korean singer and actress
- Bang So-eun, known mononymously as Soeun, South Korean idol and member of Tri.be

== See also ==
- List of Korean given names
