= Carleigh Frilles =

Filipino footballer (born 2002)

Personal information
- Full name: Carleigh Bennett Frilles
- Date of birth: April 11, 2002 (age 24)
- Place of birth: Fairfax, Virginia, U.S.
- Height: 5 ft 2 in (1.57 m)
- Positions: Midfielder; forward

Team information
- Current team: Western Sydney Wanderers
- Number: 22

Youth career
- Battlefield Bobcats

College career
Years	Team	Apps	(Gls)
2020–2021	CCU Chanticleers	32	(2)
2023–2024	VCU Rams	36	(0)

Senior career*
Years	Team	Apps	(Gls)
2023	Blacktown Spartans	11	(3)
2025–2026	DC Power	14	(0)
2026–	Western Sydney Wanderers	2	(0)

International career^{‡}
2016	Philippines U14	5	(4)
2022–	Philippines	53	(13)
Medal record
Women's football
Representing the Philippines
AFF Women's Championship
Winner	2022 Philippines	Team
Southeast Asian Games
Bronze medal – third place	2021 Vietnam	Team
- * Club domestic league appearances and goals as of November 1, 2026 ‡ National team caps and goals as of September 25, 2026

Carleigh Bennett Frilles (born April 11, 2002) is a professional footballer who plays as a midfielder or forward for A-League Women club Western Sydney Wanderers. Born in the United States, she plays for the Philippines national team.

== Early life ==
Frilles was born in Fairfax, Virginia and raised in Haymarket, Virginia. She has attended Battlefield High School, where she played four seasons and also earned a varsity letter in swimming.

== College career ==
Frilles played two seasons at Coastal Carolina University. She played for Blacktown Spartans, an Australian club that plays in the National Premier Leagues in New South Wales, in 2023 before going to the World Cup, then returned to college soccer at VCU.

== Club career ==
=== Blacktown Spartans ===
In 2023, Frilles played for Blacktown Spartans in the National Premier Leagues NSW. She made 11 appearances and scored three goals during the 2023 season.

=== DC Power ===
DC Power of the USL Super League has signed Frilles in March 2025. She made her debut for the club as a substitute in the 46th minute in a 2–1 loss to Lexington on March 9, 2025. Frilles made 10 appearances in her first year with the Power and subsequently had her contract option exercised, keeping her in DC for another season.

In her second season with the Power, Frilles had more difficulty finding playing time, coming in as a substitute in all 4 of her appearances. After her contract expired in June 2026, she departed from DC.

=== Western Sydney Wanderers ===
In September 2026, Frilles returned to Australia, signing with professional A-League Women club Western Sydney Wanderers.

== International career ==
=== Philippines Youth ===
In 2016, Frilles was called up to represent the Philippines U14 team in the AFC U14 Girls Regional Championship 2016 held in Vientiane, Laos. The Philippines U14 team finished second in the tournament.

=== Philippines ===
Frilles has represented the Philippines, making her senior debut at the 2022 AFC Women's Asian Cup. She previously played for the country's under-14 national team. Frilles scored her first international goals on her 20th birthday, April 11, 2022, in a friendly against Fiji, which the Philippines won 8–0. She went on to score five goals in the 16–0 record win in a friendly against Tonga on April 22, 2022.

Frilles was selected to the Philippines roster for the 2023 Women's World Cup. She was on the field for the Philippines' first World Cup win, coming on as an 83rd-minute substitute against New Zealand.

== Career statistics ==
=== Club ===
As of November 1, 2026

Appearances and goals by club, season and competition
Club	Season	League			Other		Total	
Club	Season	Division	Apps	Goals	Apps	Goals	Apps	Goals
Blacktown Spartans	2023	NPL NSW	11	3	1 (Note: Appearance in Sapphire Cup)	0	12	3
DC Power	2024–25	USL Super League	10	0	—		10	0
DC Power	2025–26	USL Super League	4	0	—		4	0
DC Power	Total		14	0	0	0	14	0
Western Sydney Wanderers	2026–27	A-League	2	0	—		2	0
Career total			27	3	1	0	28	3

=== International goals ===
As of match played April 8, 2025. Philippines score listed first, score column indicates score after each Frilles goal.

No.	Cap	Date	Venue	Opponent	Score	Result	Competition
1	6	April 11, 2022	Wanderers Football Park, Sydney, Australia	Fiji	5–0	8–0	Friendly
2	6	April 11, 2022	Wanderers Football Park, Sydney, Australia	Fiji	8–0	8–0	Friendly
3	7	April 22, 2022	Wanderers Football Park, Sydney, Australia	Tonga	4–0	16–0	Friendly
4	7	April 22, 2022	Wanderers Football Park, Sydney, Australia	Tonga	6–0	16–0	Friendly
5	7	April 22, 2022	Wanderers Football Park, Sydney, Australia	Tonga	8–0	16–0	Friendly
6	7	April 22, 2022	Wanderers Football Park, Sydney, Australia	Tonga	9–0	16–0	Friendly
7	7	April 22, 2022	Wanderers Football Park, Sydney, Australia	Tonga	12–0	16–0	Friendly
8	8	April 30, 2022	Valentine Sports Park, Sydney, Australia	Tonga	1–0	5–0	Friendly
9	23	October 11, 2022	Estadio Ricardo Saprissa Aymá, San Jose, Costa Rica	Costa Rica	1–0	1–2	Friendly
10	26	December 11, 2022	Wanderers Football Park, Sydney, Australia	Papua New Guinea	1–0	5–1	Friendly
11	26	December 11, 2022	Wanderers Football Park, Sydney, Australia	Papua New Guinea	4–1	5–1	Friendly
12	31	April 8, 2023	Hisor Central Strdium, Hisor, Tajikistan	Tajikistan	3–0	8–0	2024 AFC Women's Olympic Qualifying Tournament
13	41	April 8, 2025	Theyab Awana Stadium Dubai, United Arab Emirates	United Arab Emirates	2–0	4–0	Friendly

== Honours ==
=== International ===
==== Philippines U14 ====
- AFC U14 Girls Regional Championship runners-up: 2016

==== Philippines ====
- Southeast Asian Games third place: 2021
- AFF Women's Championship: 2022
