= Kenzie Roling =

American soccer player (born 2002)

Personal information
- Date of birth: 2 April 2003 (age 23)
- Height: 1.68 m (5 ft 6 in)
- Positions: Midfielder; forward

Team information
- Current team: Sydney FC
- Number: 28

Youth career
- Iowa Rush

College career
Years	Team	Apps	(Gls)
2021–2025	Iowa Hawkeyes	87	(14)

Senior career*
Years	Team	Apps	(Gls)
2026—	Sydney FC	0	(0)
- * Club domestic league appearances and goals

Makenzie Roling (born 2 April 2003) is an American professional soccer player who plays as a midfielder or forward for Sydney FC.

== Early life ==
Roling was born on 2 April 2003 and is the daughter of Brad. Growing up, she attended Waverly-Shell Rock Senior High School in the United States, where she played on the soccer team and participated in the Olympic Development Program.

== Career ==
As a youth player, Roling joined the youth academy of Iowa Rush. Ahead of the 2026–27 season, she signed for Australian side Sydney FC.

== Style of play ==
Roling plays as a midfielder or forward, is two-footed, and is known for her versatility. American newspaper The Daily Iowan wrote in 2021 that she "is a two-footed player — she can pass, dribble, and shoot from both her left and right foot. Her pace and mobility stood out".
