= Olivia Price (soccer) =

Australian footballer

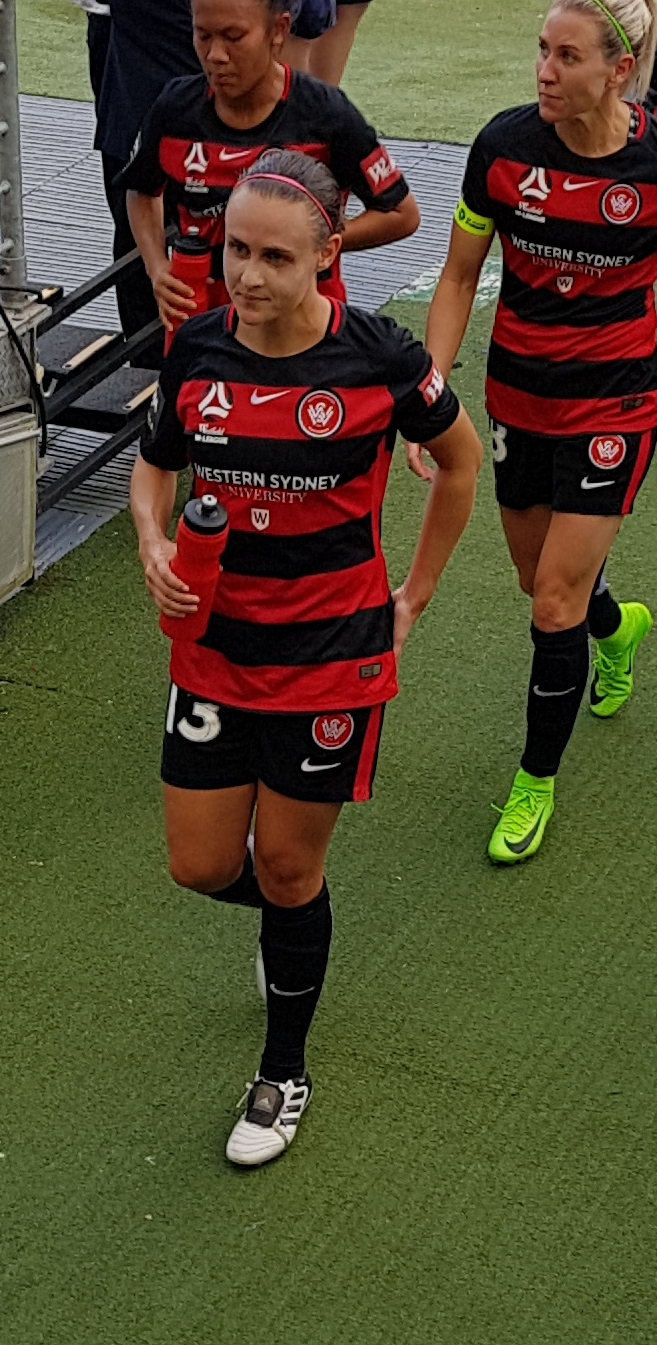
- Price at playing for Wanderers in 2017

Personal information
- Full name: Olivia Price
- Date of birth: 17 May 1996 (age 30)
- Place of birth: Sydney, New South Wales, Australia
- Position: Midfielder

Team information
- Current team: Sydney FC
- Number: 14

Senior career*
Years	Team	Apps	(Gls)
2014–2017	Sydney FC	26	(1)
2017–2018	Western Sydney Wanderers	8	(1)
2018–2020	Canberra United	21	(0)
2020–2026	Western Sydney Wanderers	59	(4)
2022–	Bankstown City	33	(7)
2026–	Sydney FC	0	(0)

International career^{‡}
2013–2015	Australia U20	19	(3)
- * Club domestic league appearances and goals as of 28 May 2024 ‡ National team caps and goals as of 1 September 2015

Olivia Price (born 17 May 1996) is an Australian soccer player who plays as a midfielder for Sydney FC and previously captained Australia for the Australian National U20 team.

== Club career ==
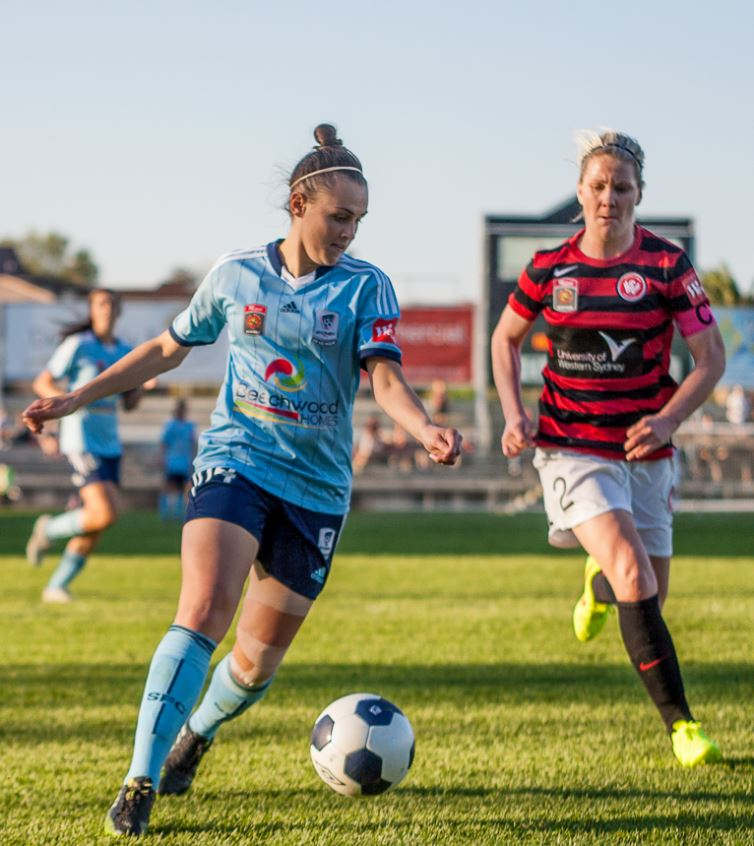
Price with Sydney FC

=== Sydney FC ===
Price signed with Sydney FC early in 2014 as an injury replacement for the last few rounds of the 2013–14 W-League Season. Price was re-signed by Sydney FC for the 2014 W-League Season. She made her debut for Sydney FC against Adelaide United on 14 September 2014, when she was substituted on in the 80th minute.

Price made her first W-League Grand Final appearance in a 4–1 loss to Melbourne City on 31 January 2016 being subbed on in the 83rd minute.

Still playing for Sydney FC in the 2016–17 season, Price made her first starting line up in a 2–0 win over Adelaide United on 27 November 2016.

=== Western Sydney Wanderers ===
Price joined Western Sydney Wanderers ahead of the 2017–18 season. In her first season for the Wanderers, Price made a total of eight appearances scoring once in a blockbuster 4–3 win against Perth Glory. In the last game of the season against Sydney FC, she dislocated her left knee which required her to have an operation in the offseason.

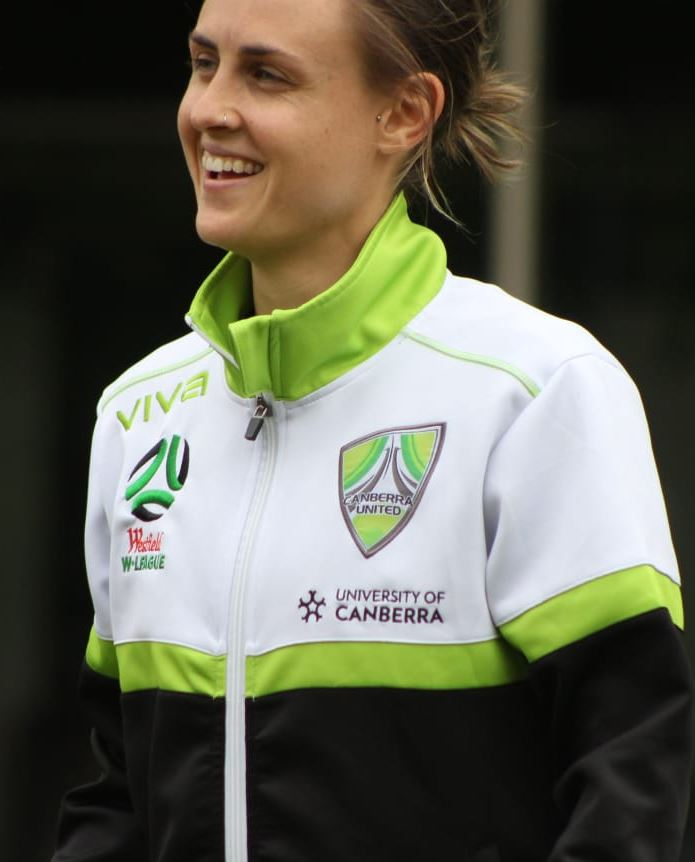
Price training with Canberra

=== Canberra United ===
During the W-League off season, Price was recovering from her knee operation. She was offered an opportunity to train with Canberra United while she was still in rehab with no contract offer on the table. She moved interstate and started training and recovering with Canberra. After fully recovering, Price showed enough to be offered a contract and joined Canberra United for the 2018–19 season W-League season. Price's first appearance in the starting line up for Canberra was on 2 December 2018, when she set up their second goal in a 2–0 win over Sydney FC.

In October 2019, Price re-signed with Canberra for the 2019–20 season.

=== Return to Western Sydney Wanderers ===
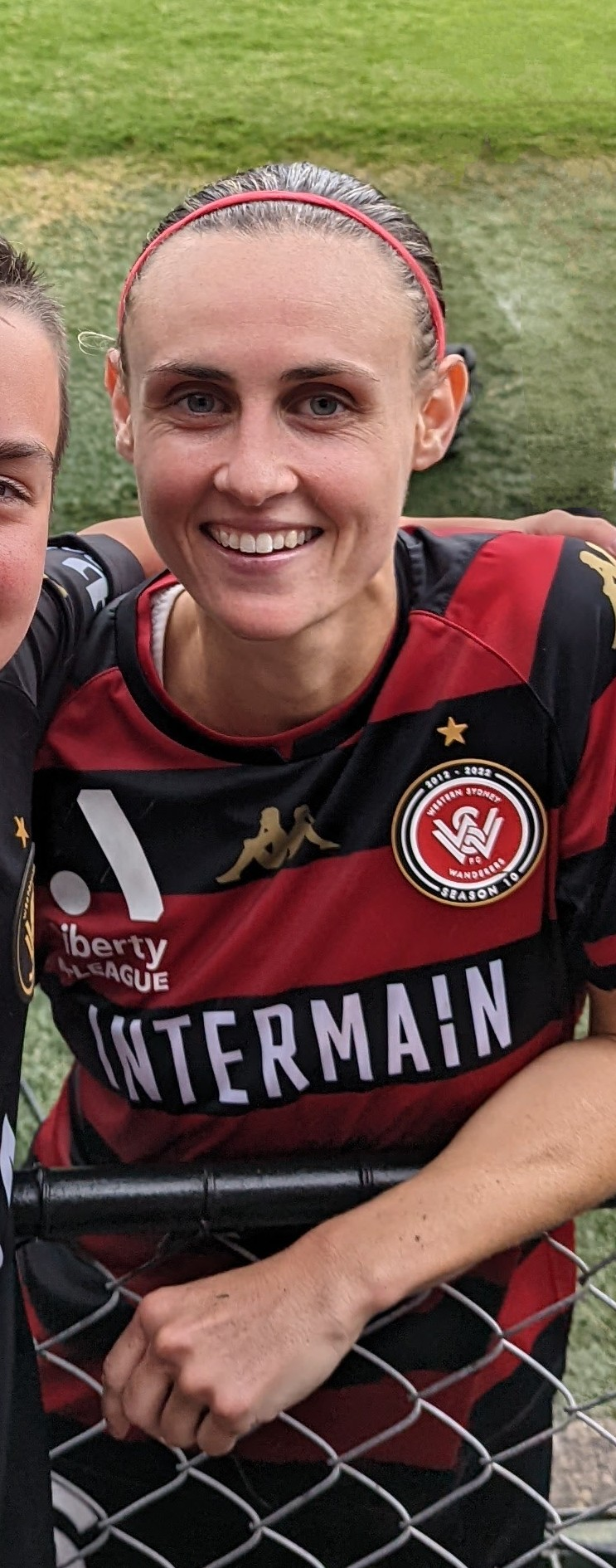
Price in 2021

In September 2020, Western Sydney Wanderers announced it had recruited Price, citing her strong work ethic and leadership qualities. In September 2026, Price departed the club at the conclusion of her contract.

=== Return to Sydney FC ===
In October 2026, Price returned to Sydney FC.

== International career ==
Price has represented Australia at both under-17 and under-20 level. She played in the team that finished runner-up to the Japanese under-23 side at the 2013 AFF Women's Championship. She went on to play for the Young Matildas for the AFC U-19 Women's Championship. Price played for the Young Matildas again in the qualifiers for the 2015 AFC U-19 Women's Championship in Vietnam and scored a brace in Australia's 19–0 win against Singapore. On 5 May 2015 Price was named Captain of the Young Matildas for their 7 – 0 win over Indonesia in the AFF Championship.

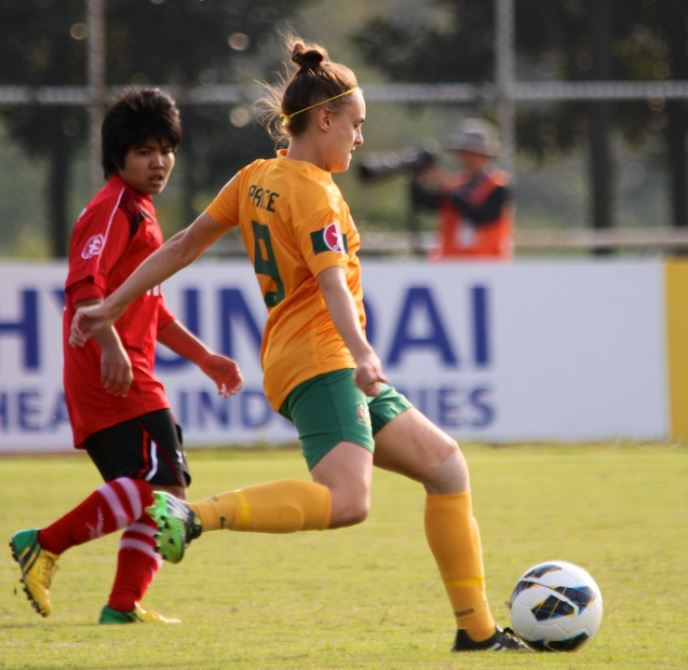
Price playing for the Young Matildias

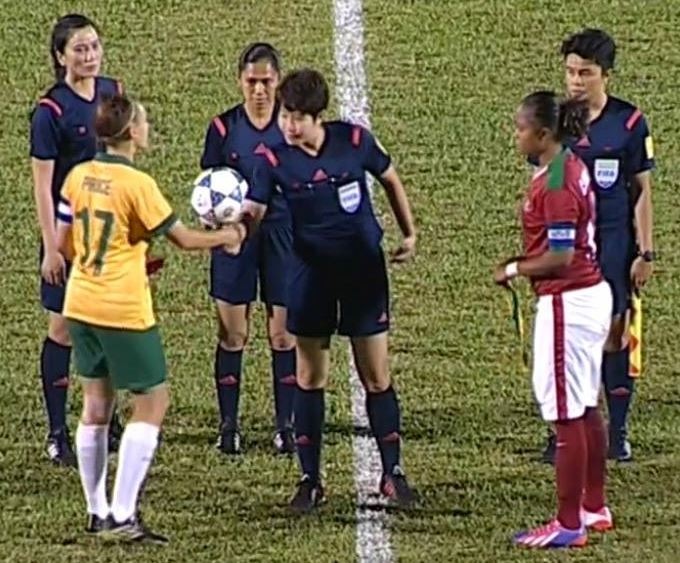
Price captaining the Young Matildias (left)
