= Ava Collins =

New Zealand footballer (born 2002)

Personal information
- Full name: Ava Teresa Collins
- Date of birth: 18 April 2002 (age 24)
- Height: 1.77 m (5 ft 10 in)
- Position: Midfielder

Youth career
- 2015–2019: St Cuthbert's College

College career
Years	Team	Apps	(Gls)
2020–2023	St. John's Red Storm	61	(12)

Senior career*
Years	Team	Apps	(Gls)
2019–2020	Eastern Suburbs		
2024–2025	Kolding IF	13	(1)
2025	Auckland United	1	(3)
2026	UNSW FC		
2026	Western Sydney Wanderers	4	(0)

International career^{‡}
2019–2022	New Zealand U20	8	(6)
2021–	New Zealand	14	(0)
- * Club domestic league appearances and goals as of 26 August 2026 ‡ National team caps and goals as of 13 February 2024

Ava Teresa Collins (born 18 April 2002) is a New Zealand footballer who last played as a midfielder for Western Sydney Wanderers in the A-League Women and for the New Zealand national team.

== College career ==
Collins played in college for St. John's Red Storm from 2020 until 2023. She made an immediate impact in her first season and was named to the All-BIG EAST Freshman Team and the United Soccer Coaches All-East Region Second Team. On debut she scored a goal and two assists against Albany Great Danes. In her second season, she appeared in 20 matches and scored four goals, including game-winners against DePaul Blue Demons and Brown Bears.

In 2022, Collins started 15 of 17 matches and finished the season with three goals. Her performances earned her a spot on the TopDrawerSoccer National Team of the Week in November. Despite missing seven games due to injury in 2023, Collins ranked third in the BIG EAST for goals per game in conference play (0.43). She scored three goals, including the game-winning goal of a 3–1 victory over Butler Bulldogs.

== Club career ==
In August 2024, Collins signed her first professional contract, joining top Danish club Kolding IF in the Elitedivisionen.

In January 2026, Collins joined UNSW FC for the 2026 National Premier Leagues NSW Women's season.

In February 2026, Collins was signed by A-League Women club Western Sydney Wanderers as an injury replacement until the end of the 2025–26 A-League Women season, following Kim So-eun's foot injury. She departed the club in August 2026, following the conclusion of her contract.

== International career ==
Collins played for the New Zealand U-20 team, winning the 2019 OFC U-19 Women's Championship in the Cook Islands which qualified them for the 2021 FIFA U-20 Women's World Cup before it was cancelled. She scored six goals across the four games she played in, five coming in one game against American Samoa.

She made her international debut for New Zealand in their 1–5 loss to Canada in October 2021.
