= Talia Younis =

Australian soccer player (born 2008)

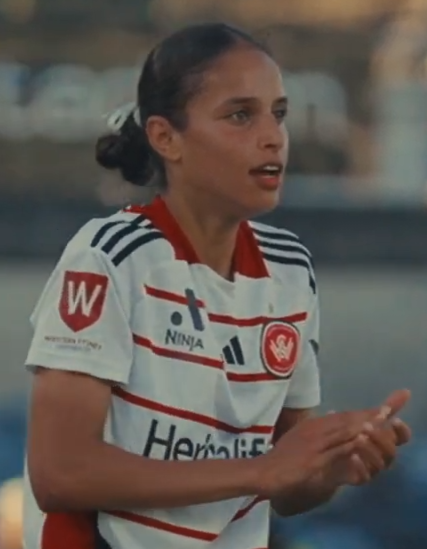
- Younis with Western Sydney Wanderers in 2026

Personal information
- Full name: Talia Marie Younis
- Date of birth: 26 October 2008 (age 18)
- Place of birth: Australia
- Position: Midfielder

Team information
- Current team: Western Sydney Wanderers
- Number: 19

Youth career
- 2019–: Western Sydney Wanderers

Senior career*
| Years | Team | Apps | (Gls) |
| 2023– | Western Sydney Wanderers | 15 | (0) |

International career^{‡}
| 2023– | Australia U17 | 11 | (2) |
| 2025– | Australia U20 | 4 | (0) |
- * Club domestic league appearances and goals as of 17 April 2024 ‡ National team caps and goals as of 14 April 2026

Talia Marie Younis (born 26 October 2008) is an Australian soccer player who plays as a midfielder for A-League Women club Western Sydney Wanderers.

Raised in Western Sydney, Younis made her first-team debut in October 2022, becoming the youngest débutant in the A-League aged 14 years and 361 days until Willa Pearson's début in 2025. She is the first player born after 2008 to feature in the A-League.

== Club career ==
Younis started playing for Western Sydney Wanderers in 2019, after trialling three times for the Wanderers Academy. She made her A-League Women debut for Wanderers on 22 October 2023 in a 3–0 defeat to Wellington Phoenix at Western Sydney Stadium. Aged 14 years and 361 days, Younis became the youngest debutant in the A-League, breaking Sam Kerr's record who debuted aged 15 years and 45 days. She also became the first player born after the inauguration of the competition in 2008 to make her maiden appearance. Her record stood for two weeks before teammate Ischia Brooking made her debut aged 14 years and 347 days old.

== International career ==
An Australian youth international, Younis was called up to Australia under-17 squad ahead of the 2024 AFC U-17 Asian Cup qualification. She scored a goal each in Australia's 11–0 win over Mongolia, and 6–2 victory over the Philippines in Hanoi.

Younis was selected by head coach Alex Epakis as part of Australia's 23-player squad for the 2026 AFC U-20 Women's Asian Cup in Thailand.

== Personal life ==
Raised in Western Sydney, Younis is of Lebanese descent. Her father, Ray, is a former National Soccer League player who works as the Wanderers's conditioning coach. Her uncle, Robert, also played professionally for Adelaide United. She has an older brother, Marcus, who is also a professional soccer player.

== See also ==
- List of association football families
