= Chinaza Uchendu =

Nigerian footballer (born 1997)

Personal information
- Full name: Chinaza Love Uchendu
- Date of birth: 3 December 1997 (age 28)
- Place of birth: Lagos, Nigeria
- Height: 1.72 m (5 ft 7 1/2 in)
- Position: Midfielder

Team information
- Current team: Al-Ahli
- Number: 15

Senior career*
Years	Team	Apps	(Gls)
2017–2018	Rivers Angels		
2018–2020	Braga	12	(4)
2020	Linköpings FC	1	(0)
2022–2024	Gyeongju KHNP	41	(5)
2024	Galatasaray	5	(0)
2024–2025	Nantes	6	(0)
2025–2026	Melbourne City	17	(3)
2026–	Al-Ahli	0	(0)

International career
2018–2019	Nigeria	10	(0)
- * Club domestic league appearances and goals as of 21 August 2026

Chinaza Love Uchendu (Igbo: [tʃí.nà.zá lɔ́v ʊ̀.tʃé.ⁿdù] born 3 December 1997) is a Nigerian international footballer who plays as a midfielder for Saudi Women's Premier League club Al-Ahli.

== Club career ==
Uchendu played for Rivers Angels in the Nigeria Women Premier League from the start of 2017 until July 2018 after that she transferred with help of to Braga in Portugal.

On 19 September 2024, Uchendu joined French side FC Nantes.

In September 2025, Uchendu was signed by Australian A-League Women club Melbourne City. At the end of the season, in August 2026, Uchendu announced her departure from the club.

== International career ==
During the 2018 Africa Women Cup of Nations Uchendu only played the final, where she was subbed in 8 minutes before the end of the extra time. She scored one of the fourth penalties in the penalty shootout that brought the Nigeria women's national football team the championship.
