= Silje Bjørneboe =

Norwegian footballer (born 2000)

Personal information
- Date of birth: 25 February 2000 (age 26)
- Position: Right-back

Team information
- Current team: Western Sydney Wanderers (on loan from Stabæk)
- Number: 4

Youth career
- –2014: Eidanger
- 2015: Urædd
- 2017: Stabæk

Senior career*
Years	Team	Apps	(Gls)
2015–2017	Urædd	31	(0)
2017–	Stabæk	174	(2)
2026–	→ Western Sydney Wanderers (loan)	0	(0)

International career
2015	Norway U15	2	(0)
2015–2016	Norway U16	16	(2)
2016–2017	Norway U17	17	(0)
2017–2018	Norway U19	10	(0)
- * Club domestic league appearances and goals as of 18 May 2015

Silje Bjørneboe (born 25 February 2000) is a Norwegian footballer who plays as a right back for Western Sydney Wanderers on loan from Stabæk.

== Club career ==
Starting her youth career in Eidanger IL, she moved to a larger team in Porsgrunn, Urædd FK, and helped win promotion to the team's sole season in the 2016 Toppserien. She also represented Norway internationally from the U15 category. She took part in the 2017 UEFA Women's Under-17 Championship and the 2019 UEFA Women's Under-19 Championship.

At the age of 17 she left Eidanger IL behind to attend the Norwegian School of Elite Sport and pursue a career at Stabæk. Still, she received a grant from Telemark County Municipality.

After Stabæk was relegated from the 2019 Toppserien, she opted to stay. At the age of 22, she reached 100 official games for Stabæk as the youngest player to do so. In June 2026, she was honored for reaching 200 games across all competitions for Stabæk, being the fifth player to reach this hallmark.

In September 2026, Bjørneboe joined Western Sydney Wanderers on loan for the 2026–27 A-League Women season.

== Personal life ==
Graduating from the University of Oslo with a master's degree in criminology, she was subsequently employed by SpareBank 1 SR-Bank in a job combatting money laundering.
