= Tegan Bertolissio =

Australian soccer player

Personal information
- Date of birth: 1 August 2006 (age 20)
- Position: Defender

Team information
- Current team: Western Sydney Wanderers
- Number: 3

Youth career
- 2022: Football NSW Institute

Senior career*
Years	Team	Apps	(Gls)
2023	Macarthur Rams	25	(1)
2023–2026	Canberra United	36	(0)
2026–	Western Sydney Wanderers	0	(0)

International career^{‡}
2024–	Australia U20	12	(0)
2025–	Australia	0	(0)
- * Club domestic league appearances and goals as of 15 April 2025 ‡ National team caps and goals as of 14 April 2026

Tegan Celia Bertolissio (Italian: [ˈtʃeːlja bertoˈlissjo]; born 1 August 2006) is an Australian soccer player who plays as a defender for A-League Women club Western Sydney Wanderers. She is the sister of Joel Bertolissio, who plays for A-League Men club Newcastle Jets.

== Club career ==
=== Canberra United ===
In August 2023, Bertolissio joined A-League Women club Canberra United.

=== Western Sydney Wanderers ===
In August 2026, Bertolissio joined Western Sydney Wanderers.

== International career ==
Bertolissio received her first call-up for the Matildas in 2025, when she was added to the extended squad for two friendlies against South Korea in Sydney and Newcastle following an injury to Ellie Carpenter.

Bertolissio was selected by head coach Alex Epakis as part of Australia' 23-player squad for the 2026 AFC U-20 Women's Asian Cup in Thailand.
