= Kennedy White =

American soccer player (born 2000)

Personal information
- Full name: Kennedy Kathleen White
- Date of birth: July 1, 2000 (age 26)
- Place of birth: Ann Arbor, Michigan
- Height: 1.77 m (5 ft 10 in)
- Position: Forward

Team information
- Current team: Tampa Bay Sun
- Number: 24

College career
Years	Team	Apps	(Gls)
2019–2022	Bowling Green Falcons	66	(27)
2023	Mississippi State Bulldogs	22	(2)

Senior career*
Years	Team	Apps	(Gls)
2019	Motor City FC		
2024–2025	Győri ETO FC		
2025–2026	Melbourne Victory	14	(8)
2026–	Tampa Bay Sun	26	(8)
- * Club domestic league appearances and goals as of 00:46, November 7, 2026 (UTC)

Kennedy Kathleen White (born July 1, 2000) is an American professional soccer player who currently plays as a forward for USL Super League club Tampa Bay Sun FC.

== Early life ==
White was born on July 1, 2000, in the United States and is a native of Michigan, United States. The daughter of Brandon and Kate, she has an older sister and a younger sister.

Growing up, she attended Bowling Green State University in the United States, where she studied marketing. Following her stint there, she attended Mississippi State University in the United States.

== Club career ==
White started her career with American side Motor City FC in 2019. During February 2024, she signed for Hungarian side Győri ETO FC.

Ahead of the 2025–26 season, she signed for Australian side Melbourne Victory FC, where she scored four goals in her first two league appearances.

On July 7, 2026, White was announced to have signed for USL Super League club Tampa Bay Sun FC.
