= Wang Ying (footballer) =

Chinese association football player

Personal information
- Date of birth: 18 November 1997 (age 28)
- Height: 1.70 m (5 ft 7 in)
- Position: Defender

Team information
- Current team: Guangdong
- Number: 3

Senior career*
Years	Team	Apps	(Gls)
2021	Tianjin Shengde	5	(0)
2022–2024	Henan Jianye	13	(0)
2025	Guangdong	3	(0)
2025–2026	Western Sydney Wanderers	14	(0)
2026–	Guangdong	0	(0)

International career^{‡}
2014	China U17	3	(0)
2019–	China	4	(0)
- * Club domestic league appearances and goals as of 3 April 2026 ‡ National team caps and goals as of 7 June 2019

Wang Ying (Chinese: 王莹; born 18 November 1997) is a Chinese professional footballer who plays as a defender for Guangdong in the Chinese Women’s Super League.

== Career statistics ==
=== International ===
As of matches played 7 June 2019.

National team	Year	Apps	Goals
China	2019	1	0
Total		1	0
