= Bente Jansen =

Dutch association football player (born 1999)

Personal information
- Date of birth: 28 August 1999 (age 27)
- Place of birth: Amsterdam, Netherlands
- Height: 1.79 m (5 ft 10 1/2 in)
- Position: Forward

Team information
- Current team: De Graafschap

Senior career*
Years	Team	Apps	(Gls)
2016–2023	FC Twente	122	(19)
2023–2025	AFC Ajax	24	(3)
2025–2026	Brisbane Roar	10	(6)
2026–	De Graafschap	0	(0)

International career^{‡}
2016–2018	Netherlands U-19	19	(4)
2018	Netherlands U-20	3	(0)
- * Club domestic league appearances and goals as of 21 January 2026 ‡ National team caps and goals as of 19 August 2025

Bente Jansen (born 28 August 1999) is a Dutch professional footballer who plays as a forward for Vrouwen Eredivisie club De Graafschap. She has previously played for FC Twente, AFC Ajax, and Brisbane Roar.

== Club career ==
=== Early career ===
In 2016, Jansen started her career at FC Twente in the Eredivisie, and her contract was extended a year later.

In the summer of 2023, she signed a one-year contract with Ajax. This was extended once in 2024. In June 2025, Ajax announced that Jansen's contract would not be extended and she would leave the club after the 2024–25 season.

=== Brisbane Roar ===
In September 2025, Jansen signed with Brisbane Roar ahead of the 2025–26 season. At the end of the season, Jansen won the club's season awards of Player's Player of the Year and Golden Boot as top scorer. In May 2026, the club announced her departure at the end of her contract, due to her intention to return to Europe.

=== De Graafschap ===
In June 2026, recently promoted Dutch club De Graafschap announced signing Jansen.

== International career ==
Jansen was called up by the Royal Dutch Football Association (KNVB) in 2016 to play for the under-19 team, included in the squad for the qualifications for the 2017 European Championship in Northern Ireland. She made her debut on 13 September, in the friendly draw which the Oranje U-19s drew goalless against their peers from Italy, and then shared the path of her national team which saw them, after having gained access to the final phase, overcome the group stage in first place in group B and lose 3–2 in the semi-final against Spain. She was also called up for the subsequent qualification phase for the 2018 European Championship in Switzerland, playing all six matches played by her national team and scoring a total of 2 goals, however she was not called up for the final phase.

Thanks to their placement in Northern Ireland 2017, the Netherlands qualified for the 2018 World Cup in France, reserved for teams under 20 years of age. Selected for the tournament, Jansen played three of the four matches played by the Oranje U-20s, two in Group A and the quarter-final match lost to England who finished the match 2–1 after a comeback, eliminating them from the tournament.
