= Yuan Cong =

Chinese footballer (born 2000)

Personal information
- Date of birth: 17 April 2000 (age 26)
- Place of birth: China
- Height: 1.79 m (5 ft 10 in)
- Position: Forward

Senior career*
Years	Team	Apps	(Gls)
–2022	Shandong WFC		
2023	Alhama CF B		
2023	Rayo Vallecano		
2024–2025	Guangdong WFC		
2025–2026	Western Sydney Wanderers	15	(3)

International career
	China	6	(0)
- * Club domestic league appearances and goals as of 3 April 2026

Yuan Cong (Chinese: 袁丛; born 17 April 2000) is a Chinese professional footballer who last played as a forward for Western Sydney Wanderers.

== Early life ==
Yuan was born on 17 April 2000. Born in China, she is a native of Qingdao. Growing up, she attended Chengyang District Experimental Primary School in China.

== Club career ==
Yuan started her career with Chinese side Shandong WFC. Following her stint there, she signed for Spanish side Alhama CF B in 2023. The same year, she signed for Spanish side Rayo Vallecano.

Subsequently, she signed for Chinese side Guangdong WFC in 2024. Ahead of the 2025–26 season, she signed for Australian side Western Sydney Wanderers. In July 2026, the club announced Yuan's departure at the end of her contract.

== International career ==
Yuan is a China international. During February 2025, she played for the China women's national football team at the 2025 Pinatar Cup.

== International goals ==
No.	Date	Venue	Opponent	Score	Result	Competition
1.	21 September 2026	Gifu Nagaragawa Stadium, Gifu, Japan	Philippines	5–1	5–1	2026 Asian Games
