= Janae DeFazio =

Filipino footballer (born 2001)

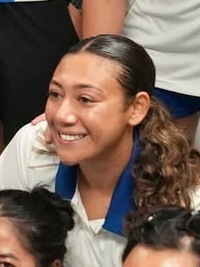
- DeFazio in 2025

Personal information
- Full name: Janae Allana Palpal-latoc DeFazio
- Date of birth: September 6, 2001 (age 25)
- Place of birth: Folsom, California, U.S.
- Height: 5 ft 5 in (1.64 m)
- Positions: Forward; defender

Team information
- Current team: Kaya–Iloilo
- Number: 13

College career
Years	Team	Apps	(Gls)
2019–2023	UCLA Bruins	37	(0)

Senior career*
Years	Team	Apps	(Gls)
2024	Kansas City Current	1	(0)
2024	Racing Power	1	(0)
2025	Makati	7	(0)
2025–2026	Western Sydney Wanderers	3	(0)

International career^{‡}
2024–	Philippines	11	(0)
Medal record
Women's football
Representing the Philippines
Southeast Asian Games
Gold medal – first place	2025 Thailand	Team
- * Club domestic league appearances and goals as of November 22, 2025 ‡ National team caps and goals as of December 17, 2025

Janae Allana Palpal-latoc DeFazio (born September 6, 2001) is a professional footballer who plays as a defender for PFF Women's League club Kaya–Iloilo. Born in the United States, she represents the Philippines at international level.

== Early life ==
Janae Allana DeFazio was born in the United States in Folsom, California but considers El Dorado Hills as her hometown. Her parents are Joe and Judy DeFazio and has two younger siblings. She attended St. Francis Catholic High School in Sacramento and graduated from University of California, Los Angeles (UCLA) in 2023.

== College career ==
DeFazio played for the UCLA Bruins women's soccer team. She made 37 appearances for UCLA playing as a midfielder.

== Club career ==
DeFazio played for the Kansas City Current. She was signed in by the club ahead of Kansas' second match in the 2024 NWSL x Liga MX Femenil Summer Cup.

In September 2024, she moved to Racing Power of Portugal's Campeonato Nacional Feminino. In 2025, DeFazio moved to Makati F.C. to play in the PFF Women's League.

In October 2025, DeFazio joined Australian club Western Sydney Wanderers. She left the squad in July 2026 after her contract ended.

== International career ==
DeFazio received a call up to the Philippine women's national team for the Pink Ladies Cup in Antalya, Turkey. In her first international cap, DeFazio made the assist for Sarina Bolden's first goal in their 3–0 win against Jordan on October 26, 2024.

== Career statistics ==
=== International ===
As of match played December 17, 2025

Appearances and goals by national team and year
National team	Year	Apps	Goals	Assists
Philippines	2024	2	0	1
Philippines	2025	9	0	1
Total		11	0	2

== Honors ==
UCLA Bruins

- NCAA Division I women's soccer tournament: 2022

Philippines

- Southeast Asian Games: 2025
