= Elizabeth Anton =

New Zealand footballer (born 1998)

Personal information
- Full name: Elizabeth Grace Anton
- Date of birth: 12 December 1998 (age 27)
- Place of birth: Auckland, New Zealand
- Height: 1.69 m (5 ft 7 in)
- Position: Defender

Team information
- Current team: Canberra United
- Number: 3

Senior career*
Years	Team	Apps	(Gls)
2020–2024	Perth Glory	62	(2)
2024–2025	Canberra United	17	(1)
2025	Kolbotn	25	(0)
2025–	Canberra United	18	(1)

International career^{‡}
2013–2014	New Zealand U17		
2017–2018	New Zealand U20		
2017–	New Zealand	28	(0)
- * Club domestic league appearances and goals as of 23 May 2026. ‡ National team caps and goals as of 23 May 2026.

Elizabeth Grace Anton (born 12 December 1998) is a New Zealand professional association football player currently playing for Canberra United in the A-League Women and the New Zealand national team.

== Personal life ==
Anton was born in Auckland, New Zealand, in 1998.

== Club career ==
In December 2020, Anton joined Perth Glory, together with fellow New Zealanders Lily Alfeld and Malia Steinmetz.

In September 2024, Anton joined Canberra United.

In March 2025, Anton departed Canberra United to join Norwegian club Kolbotn.

In November 2025, Anton returned to Canberra United, signing until the end of the 2025–26 A-League Women season.

== International career ==
Anton was a member of the New Zealand U-17 side at the 2014 FIFA U-17 Women's World Cup in Costa Rica, the 2016 FIFA U-20 Women's World Cup in Papua New Guinea, and again at the 2018 FIFA U-20 Women's World Cup in France.

Anton made her senior début as a substitute in a 5–0 win over Thailand on 28 November 2017.
