= Kim So-eun (footballer) =

South Korean footballer (born 1998)

Personal information
- Date of birth: 20 September 1998 (age 28)
- Place of birth: South Korea
- Height: 1.60 m (5 ft 3 in)
- Positions: Midfielder; forward

Team information
- Current team: Gyeongju KHNP
- Number: 37

Senior career*
Years	Team	Apps	(Gls)
–2023	Sejong Sportstoto		
2024–2025	Incheon Red Angels		
2025–2026	Western Sydney Wanderers	10	(0)
2026–	Gyeongju KHNP		

International career
- South Korea
- * Club domestic league appearances and goals as of 21 October 2026

Kim So-eun (Korean: 김소은, pronounced [kim so.ɯn]; born 20 September 1998), nicknamed Sony (Korean: 쏘니, [s͈o.ni]), is a South Korean professional footballer who plays as a midfielder or forward for WK League club Gyeongju KHNP. She previously played for WK League clubs Sejong Sportstoto and Incheon Red Angels, and for A-League Women club Western Sydney Wanderers.

== Early life ==
Kim was born on 20 September 1998 in South Korea. Growing up, she attended Ulsan National Institute of Science and Technology in South Korea.

== Club career ==
Kim started her career with Sejong Sportstoto WFC. Following her stint there, she signed for Incheon Hyundai Steel Red Angels WFC in 2024. Ahead of the 2025–26 season, she signed for Australian side Western Sydney Wanderers. In July 2026, the club announced the departure of Kim at the conclusion of her contract.

== International career ==
Kim is a South Korea international. During November 2016, she played for the South Korea women's national football team at the 2016 FIFA U-20 Women's World Cup.

== Style of play ==
Kim plays as a midfielder or forward. A South Korean news website wrote in 2019 that "she is the type of player that makes up for her short stature with her skill and speed".
