= List of Central Coast Mariners FC (women) players =

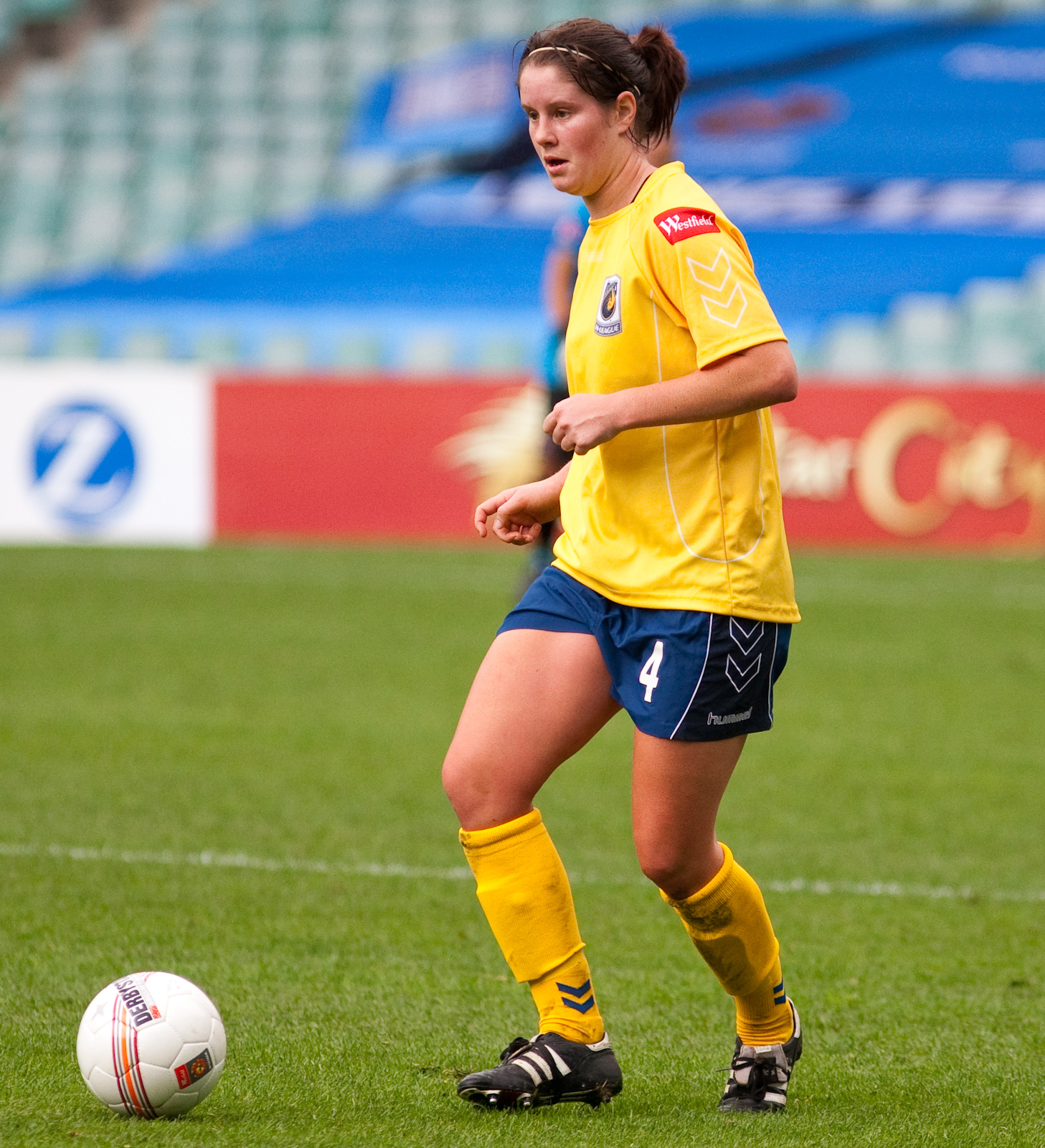
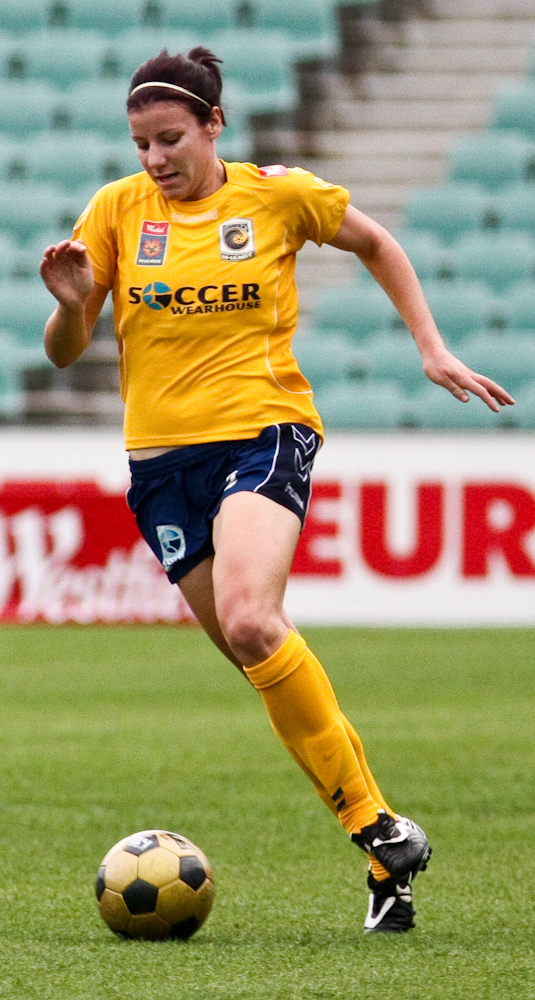
Rachael Doyle and Renee Rollason had the equal most appearances for Central Coast Mariners (A-League Women) before the club was reformed in 2023.

Central Coast Mariners Football Club (women), a women's association football club based in Tuggerah, Central Coast, was founded in 2008. The club's first team has competed in the A-League Women and all players who have played in at least one match are listed below.

Bianca Galic currently holds the record for the greatest number of appearances for Central Coast Mariners (women). Between 2023 and 2024, she played 34 times for the club. The club's goalscoring record is held by Michelle Heyman, who scored 11 goals in 2009.

== Key ==
- The list is ordered first by date of debut, and then if necessary in alphabetical order.
- Appearances as a substitute are included.
- Statistics are correct up to and including the match played on 31 December 2024. Where a player left the club permanently after this date, her statistics are updated to her date of leaving.

Positions key
GK	Goalkeeper
DF	Defender
MF	Midfielder
FW	Forward

Nationality
Unless otherwise noted, the nationality of a player is determined by the country/countries which he has played for, or if said person has not played international football, their country of birth.
Position
Playing positions are listed according to the tactical formations that were employed at the time.
Club career
Club career is defined as the first and last calendar years in which the player appeared for the club in any of the competitions listed below.
Total appearances and Total goals
Total appearances and goals comprise those in the W-League/A-League Women regular season and finals series.

== Players ==
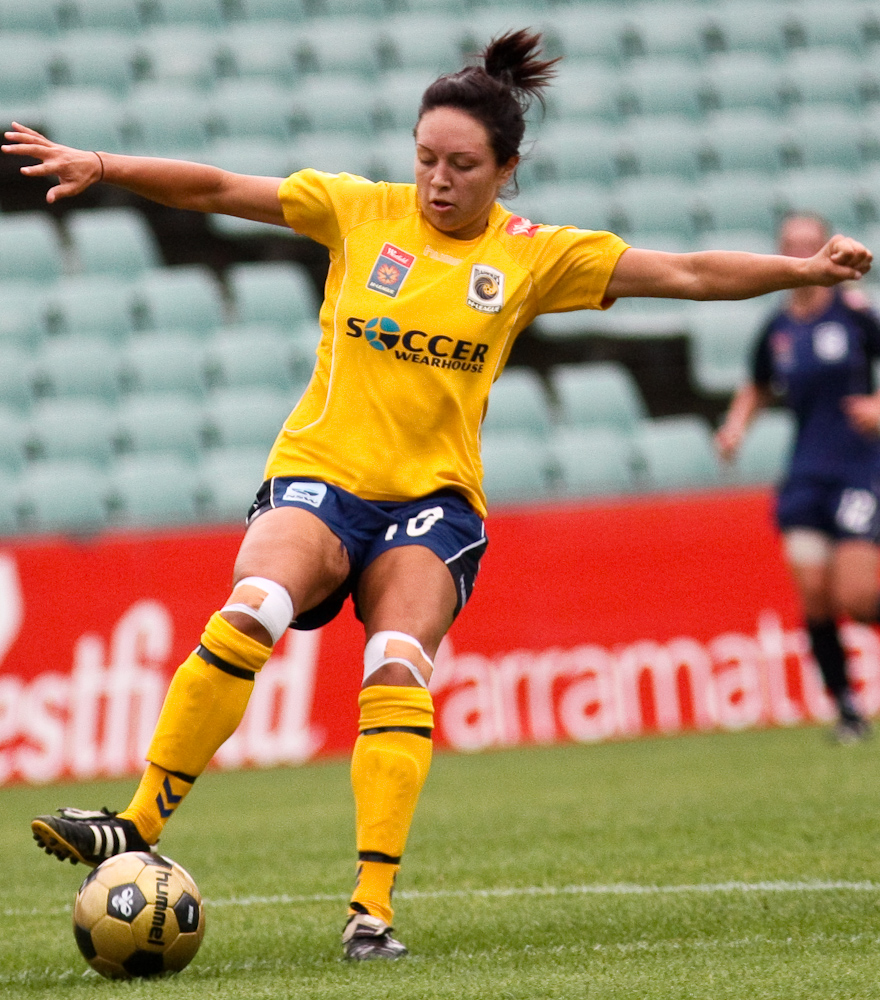
Kyah Simon played in the club's first season, and the club's return season in 2023–24.

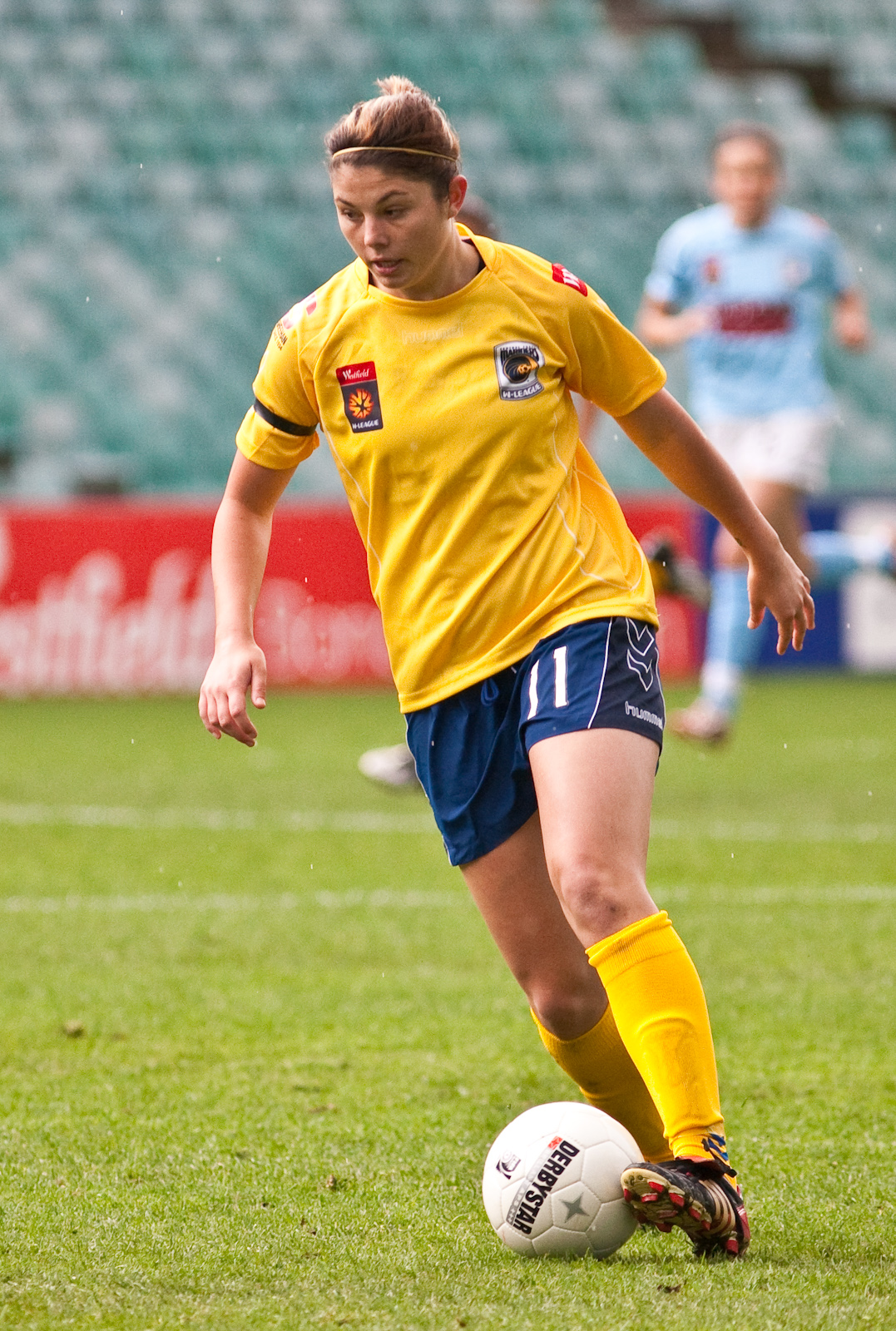
Michelle Heyman is the club's top goalscorer at 11 goals.

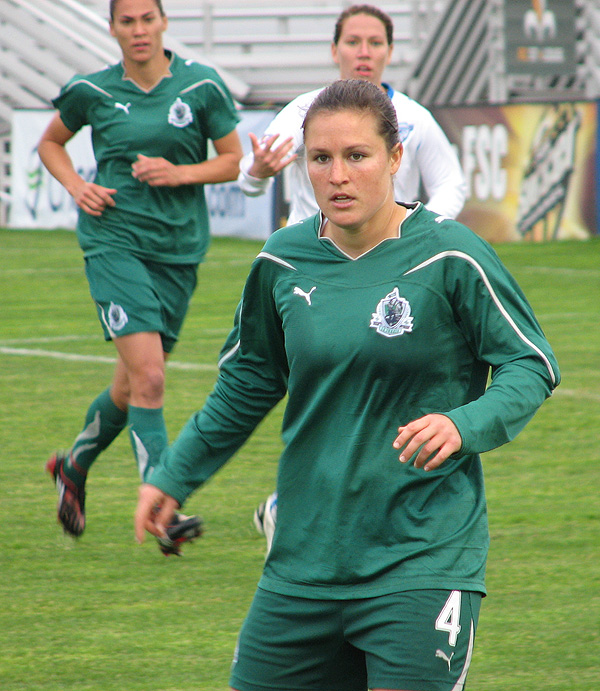
Kendall Fletcher were one of the first foreigners to play for Central Coast Mariners (A-League Women).

Players highlighted in bold are still actively playing at Central Coast Mariners (A-League Women).

List of Central Coast Mariners FC (women) players
Player	Nationality	Pos	Club career	Starts	Subs	Total	Goals	Ref.
Player	Nationality	Pos	Club career	Appearances			Goals	Ref.
Trudy Camilleri	Australia	MF	2008–2009	11	9	20	5	
Caitlin Cooper	Australia	DF	2008–2009	20	0	20	0	
Rachael Doyle	Australia	DF	2008–2009	21	0	21	0	
Gill Foster	Australia	MF	2008	5	4	9	0	
Lyndsay Glohe	Australia	DF	2008–2009	19	1	20	0	
Stephanie Haim	Australia	FW	2008	2	3	5	0	
Lisa Hartley	Australia	GK	2008	5	1	6	0	
Elizabeth O'Reilly	Australia	MF	2008–2009	1	8	9	1	
Teresa Polias	Australia	MF	2008–2009	11	4	15	0	
Taryn Rockall	Australia	MF	2008	1	1	2	0	
Renee Rollason	Australia	MF	2008–2009	21	0	21	3	
Karina Roweth	Australia	MF	2008	8	0	8	0	
Britt Simmons	Australia	MF	2008–2009	2	3	5	0	
**Kyah Simon**	Australia	FW	2008; 2024–	18	3	21	8	
Jodie Bain	Australia	DF	2008	9	0	9	0	
Kathryn Pryer	Australia		2008	0	2	2	0	
Emma Stewart	Australia	FW	2008	0	2	2	0	
Emma-Kate Dewhurst	Australia	GK	2008	5	1	6	0	
Ellyse Perry	Australia	DF	2008	0	3	3	0	
Jenna Kingsley	Australia	FW	2008–2009	10	6	16	3	
Brooke Starrett	Australia		2008	0	1	1	0	
Kendall Fletcher	United States	DF	2009	11	0	11	4	
Kelly Golebiowski	Australia	MF	2009	8	1	9	0	
Michelle Heyman	Australia	FW	2009	11	0	11	11	
Jillian Loyden	United States	GK	2009	11	0	11	0	
Jessica Seaman	Australia	DF	2009	2	5	7	0	
Samantha Spackman	Australia	MF	2009	10	1	11	0	
Lydia Vandenbergh	United States	MF	2009	11	0	11	4	
Ashleigh Connor	Australia	FW	2009	8	1	9	2	
Rola Badawiya	Australia	MF	2023–2024	24	1	25	8	
Faye Bryson	England	FW	2023–2024	19	2	21	1	
**Bianca Galic**	Australia	MF	2023–	33	1	34	2	
**Isabel Gomez**	Australia	DF	2023–	27	1	28	3	
**Ash Irwin**	Australia	DF	2023–	32	0	32	0	
Tiarna Karambasis	Australia	MF	2023–2024	11	7	18	1	
Alexia Karrys-Stahl	Australia	FW	2023–2024	1	15	16	0	
**Taren King**	Australia	DF	2023–	10	0	10	1	
**Annabel Martin**	Australia	DF	2023–	27	3	30	0	
Courtney Newbon	Australia	GK	2023	4	0	4	0	
**Annalise Rasmussen**	Australia	MF	2023–	9	21	30	6	
**Peta Trimis**	Australia	FW	2023–	17	13	30	3	
Jazmin Wardlow	United States	DF	2023–2024	24	1	25	0	
Wurigumula	China	FW	2023–2024	21	4	25	8	
**Shadeene Evans**	Australia	FW	2023–	4	16	20	1	
Paige Hayward	Australia	FW	2023–2024	20	4	24	1	
Maya Lobo	Australia	DF	2023–2024	0	2	2	0	
Casey Dumont	Australia	GK	2023–2024	12	0	12	0	
**Tess Quilligan**	Australia	MF	2023–	8	10	18	0	
Briana Woodall	Mexico	MF	2023	0	2	2	0	
**Sarah Langman**	Australia	GK	2023–	18	1	19	0	
**Sophie Nenadovic**	Australia	DF	2024–	0	1	1	0	
**Jessika Nash**	Australia	DF	2024–	9	0	9	0	
**Brooke Nunn**	England	MF	2024–	8	1	9	0	
**Jade Pennock**	England	FW	2024–	9	0	9	2	
**Leia Puxty**	Australia	FW	2024–	3	5	8	1	
**Taylor Ray**	Australia	MF	2024–	9	0	9	0	
**Brianne Riley**	United States	DF	2024–	5	0	5	0	
**Lily McMahon**	Australia	MF	2024–	0	5	5	0	
**Tiana Fuller**	Australia	FW	2024–	0	5	5	2	
**Sarah Rowe**	Republic of Ireland	MF	2024–	1	1	2	0	
