= 2025–26 Central Coast Mariners FC (women) season =

Central Coast Mariners (women)
2025–26 season
- Chairman: Richard Peil
- Head Coach: Kory Babington
- Stadium: Industree Group Stadium
- A-League Women: 7th
- A-League Women Finals: DNQ
- Top goalscorer: Annalise Rasmussen (11)
Home colours	Away colours	Third colours
- All statistics correct as of 26 July 2025.

The 2025–26 season was the Central Coast Mariners Football Club (women)'s fifth season in the A-League Women.

== Players ==
Note: Flags indicate national team as defined under FIFA eligibility rules; some limited exceptions apply. Players may hold more than one non-FIFA nationality.

No.	Pos.	Nation	Player
1	GK	AUS	Sarah Langman
3	DF	AUS	Elizabeth Grey
4	DF	AUS	Baxter Thew
5	DF	AUS	Annabel Martin
6	MF	AUS	Isabel Gomez
7	MF	AUS	Avaani Prakash
8	MF	AUS	Maya Fernandez
9	FW	ENG	Millie Farrow
10	MF	AUS	Tamar Levin
12	MF	AUS	Tiana Fuller
13	DF	AUS	Kaiya Buchanan
14	MF	AUS	Greta Kraszula
15	GK	AUS	Annalee Grove

No.	Pos.	Nation	Player
16	MF	AUS	Tess Quilligan
17	MF	AUS	Jynaya dos Santos
18	DF	AUS	Taren King (captain)
19	MF	AUS	Jaya Bowman
20	GK	AUS	Baylee Broomhead
21	FW	AUS	Eliza Familton (scholarship)
22	FW	AUS	Peta Trimis
23	DF	SUI	Lorena Baumann
25	DF	USA	Blake Hughes (scholarship)
26	MF	AUS	Isabella Coco-Di Sipio
30	GK	AUS	Sophia Varley
77	DF	USA	Cannon Clough

== Transfers ==
=== Transfers in ===
No.	Position	Player	From	Type/fee	Contract length	Date	Ref
77	DF	(United States) Cannon Clough	(United States) Carolina Ascent	Free transfer	1 year	23 October 2025	
3	DF	Elizabeth Grey	(Australia) Bulls FC Academy	Free transfer	1 year	28 October 2025	
7	MF	Avaani Prakash	Unattached	Free transfer	1 year	28 October 2025	
9	FW	(England) Millie Farrow	Unattached	Free transfer	1 year	28 October 2025	
17	FW	Jynaya dos Santos	Canberra United	Free transfer	1 year	28 October 2025	
19	MF	Jaya Bowman	Canberra United	Free transfer	1 year	28 October 2025	
4	DF	Baxter Thew	(Australia) Sydney Olympic	Free transfer	1 year	29 October 2025	
8	MF	Maya Fernandez	(Australia) Sydney Olympic	Free transfer	1 year	29 October 2025	
10	MF	Tamar Levin	Unattached	Free transfer	1 year	29 October 2025	
23	DF	(Switzerland) Lorena Baumann	Unattached	Free transfer	1 year	29 October 2025	
26	MF	Isabella Coco-Di Sipio	(Australia) Bulls FC Academy	Free transfer	1 year	29 October 2025	
30	GK	Sophia Varley	Unattached	Free transfer	1 year	29 October 2025	
13	DF	Kaiya Buchanan	(Australia) Mount Druitt Town Rangers	Free transfer	1 year	30 October 2025	
15	GK	Annalee Grove	Unattached	Free transfer	1 year	30 October 2025	
20	GK	Baylee Broomhead	(Australia) Sydney University	Free transfer	1 year	30 October 2025	

=== Transfers out ===
No.	Position	Player	Transferred to	Type/fee	Date	Ref
13	MF	(Republic of Ireland) Sarah Rowe	(Australia) Collingwood (AFLW)	End of contract	23 May 2025	
2	DF	Jessica Seaman	(Australia) APIA Leichhardt	End of contract	5 June 2025	
19	DF	Leia Puxty	(Australia) UNSW FC	End of contract	5 June 2025	
23	FW	Lily McMahon	(Australia) Northern Tigers	End of contract	5 June 2025	
3	DF	Ash Irwin	Unattached	End of contract	30 June 2025	
20	GK	Chloe Carmichael	Unattached	End of contract	30 June 2025	
7	FW	(England) Jade Pennock	(United States) Sporting JAX (Note: Pennock returned from loan to her parent club Birmingham City before signing with Sporting JAX)	End of loan	1 July 2025	
8	MF	(Croatia) Bianca Galic	Sydney FC	End of contract	30 July 2025	
4	DF	Jessika Nash	(Italy) Sassuolo	End of contract	31 July 2025	
24	FW	Shadeene Evans	(Thailand) College of Asian Scholars	End of contract	22 August 2025	
10	MF	Taylor Ray	Melbourne Victory	End of contract	29 August 2025	
17	GK	Teresa Morrissey	Perth Glory	End of contract	26 September 2025	
21	FW	(England) Brooke Nunn	Wellington Phoenix	End of contract	24 October 2025	
11	FW	Annalise Rasmussen	(Italy) Juventus	Undisclosed	3 February 2026	

=== Contract extensions ===
No.	Player	Position	Duration	Date	Ref.
5	Annabel Martin	Defender	1 year	22 October 2025	
1	Sarah Langman	Goalkeeper	1 year	23 October 2025	
12	Tiana Fuller	Midfielder	1 year	23 October 2025	
14	Greta Kraszula	Midfielder	1 year	23 October 2025	
21	Eliza Familton	Forward	1 year	30 October 2025	
25	(United States) Blake Hughes	Defender	1 year	30 October 2025	

== Pre-season and friendlies ==
12 October 2025	Central Coast Mariners	2–1	Wellington Phoenix	Gosford
	Gomez 25'	Report	Bhandari	Stadium: polytec Stadium

== Competitions ==
=== Overall record ===
Competition	First match	Last match	Final position	Record							
Competition	First match	Last match	Final position	Pld	W	D	L	GF	GA	GD	Win %
A-League Women	2 November 2025	4 April 2026	7th	20	7	7	6	27	26	+1	35.00
Total				20	7	7	6	27	26	+1	35.00

Last updated: 4 April 2026
Source: Competitions

=== A-League Women ===
==== League table ====
Pos	Team	Pld	W	D	L	GF	GA	GD	Pts	Qualification
5	Adelaide United	20	9	3	8	24	26	−2	30	Qualification for Finals series
6	Melbourne Victory	20	8	4	8	27	24	+3	28	Qualification for Finals series
7	Central Coast Mariners	20	7	7	6	27	26	+1	28	
8	Perth Glory	20	7	3	10	20	30	−10	24	
9	Newcastle Jets	20	7	2	11	30	36	−6	23	

Source: A-Leagues
Rules for classification: 1) points; 2) goal difference; 3) goals scored; 4) wins; 5) head-to-head results; 5a) head-to-head points; 5b) head-to-head goal difference; 6) Fair Play points; 7) away goal difference; 8) away goals per match; 9) home goal difference; 10) home goals per match; 11) toss of a coin in an event of a tie of two clubs.

==== Matches ====
Win Draw Loss

2 November 2025 1	Central Coast Mariners	3–0	Adelaide United	Gosford
16:15 AEDT	Trimis 39'; Dos Santos 41'; Gomez 79'	Report		Stadium: polytec Stadium; Attendance: 1,720; Referee: Abbie Hendry

8 November 2025 2	Melbourne City	4–0	Central Coast Mariners	Melbourne
15:00 AEDT	McNamara 32', 54' (pen.); McMahon 46', 71'	Report		Stadium: ctrl:cyber Pitch; Attendance: 211; Referee: Caitlin Williams

15 November 2025 3	Melbourne Victory	1–0	Central Coast Mariners	Melbourne
17:00 AEDT	Pollicina 55'	Report		Stadium: Home of the Matildas; Attendance: 918; Referee: Caitlin Williams

23 November 2025 4	Sydney FC	1–0	Central Coast Mariners	Sydney
16:00 AEDT	Caspers 76'	Report		Stadium: Leichhardt Oval; Attendance: 2,455; Referee: Page Malau-Aduli

7 December 2025 6	Central Coast Mariners	4–1	Newcastle Jets	Gosford
19:00 AEDT	Rasmussen 42', 71'; Levin 78'; Familton 83'	Report	L. Allan 22'	Stadium: polytec Stadium; Attendance: 328; Referee: Sophie Allum
Note: Match was postponed due to extreme heat.

14 December 2025 7	Western Sydney Wanderers	1–2	Central Coast Mariners	Sydney
19:00 AEDT	Younis 90'	Report	Coco-Di Sipio 18'; Gomez 28'	Stadium: Wanderers Football Park; Attendance: 932; Referee: Bec Mackie
Note: The match was delayed by two hours due to forecasted heat.

20 December 2025 8	Canberra United	1–1	Central Coast Mariners	Canberra
17:30 AEDT	Grove 90'	Report	Rasmussen 67'	Stadium: McKellar Park; Attendance: 1,152; Referee: Isabella Mossin

27 December 2025 9	Central Coast Mariners	3–3	Melbourne Victory	Gosford
17:00 AEDT	Trimis 31'; Rasmussen 53', 61'	Report	Pollicina 90+1'; Sakalis 90+3'; O'Grady 90+4'	Stadium: polytec Stadium; Attendance: 1,427; Referee: Page Malau-Aduli

31 December 2025 10	Central Coast Mariners	3–2	Brisbane Roar	Gosford
16:15 AEDT	Coco-Di Sipio 3'; Rasmussen 45+9', 55'	Report	Kuilamu 13'; Freier 18'	Stadium: polytec Stadium; Referee: Mikayla Ryan

4 January 2026 11	Adelaide United	1–0	Central Coast Mariners	Adelaide
16:20 ACDT	Condon 47'	Report		Stadium: Marden Sports Complex; Attendance: 4,667; Referee: Izzy Cooper

10 January 2026 12	Newcastle Jets	1–2	Central Coast Mariners	Newcastle
19:00 AEDT	Brown 45+2'	Report	Trimis 53'; Rasmussen 70'	Stadium: No.2 Sportsground; Attendance: 1,261; Referee: Bec Mackie
Note: Due to an extreme heat forecast, the match's kick-off time was delayed by two hours.

18 January 2026 13	Central Coast Mariners	1–1	Perth Glory	Gosford
17:00 AEDT	Trimis 61'	Report	Phonsongkham 34'	Stadium: polytec Stadium; Attendance: 1,000; Referee: Anna-Marie Keighley

24 January 2026 14	Central Coast Mariners	1–2	Western Sydney Wanderers	Gosford
17:00 AEDT	Rasmussen 41'	Report	Caspers 35', 57'	Stadium: polytec Stadium; Attendance: 1,248; Referee: Caitlin Williams

30 January 2026 15	Brisbane Roar	2–2	Central Coast Mariners	Brisbane
20:00 AEDT	Miller 9'; Brown 74'	Report	Rasmussen 14' (pen.), 77'	Stadium: Imperial Corp Stadium; Attendance: 1,899; Referee: Sophie Allum

15 February 2026 17	Wellington Phoenix	1–2	Central Coast Mariners	Porirua
16:00 NZDT	Anthony 28'	Report	Trimis 16'; Levin 45+2'	Stadium: Porirua Park; Attendance: 1,203; Referee: Anna-Marie Keighley

20 February 2026 18	Central Coast Mariners	1–3	Melbourne City	Gosford
19:00 AEDT	Gomez 77'	Report	Henry 52'; Stott 68'; Keane 74'	Stadium: polytec Stadium; Attendance: 1,003; Referee: Lara Lee

21 March 2026 20	Perth Glory	0–0	Central Coast Mariners	Perth
14:00AWST		Report		Stadium: Sam Kerr Football Centre; Attendance: 793; Referee: Sophie Allum

25 March 2026 5	Central Coast Mariners	2–1	Wellington Phoenix	Gosford
19:00 AEDT	Familton 58'; Gomez 83'	Report	Fraser 90+3'	Stadium: polytec Stadium; Attendance: 534; Referee: Sophie Allum
Note: Initially scheduled for 29 November 2025, the match was rescheduled to 25 March 2026 as a result of a match between Australia and New Zealand scheduled for 28 November 2025.

29 March 2026 21	Central Coast Mariners	0–0	Canberra United	Gosford
16:00 AEDT		Report		Stadium: polytec Stadium; Attendance: 1,037; Referee: Bec Mackie

4 April 2026 22	Central Coast Mariners	0–0	Sydney FC	Gosford
14:15 AEDT		Report		Stadium: polytec Stadium; Attendance: 1,656; Referee: Sophie Allum
Note: The kickoff time was moved to allow the match to be broadcast on 10 Drama.

== Statistics ==
=== Appearances and goals ===
Includes all competitions. Players with no appearances not included in the list.

As of match played 4 April 2026

No.	Pos	Nat	Player	Total		A-League Women	
No.	Pos	Nat	Player	Apps	Goals	Apps	Goals
1	GK	(Australia) AUS	Sarah Langman	5	0	5	0
3	DF	(Australia) AUS	Elizabeth Barwick-Grey	18	0	15+3	0
4	DF	(Australia) AUS	Baxter Thew	7	0	6+1	0
5	DF	(Australia) AUS	Annabel Martin	16	0	15+1	0
6	MF	(Australia) AUS	Isabel Gomez	17	4	15+2	4
7	MF	(Australia) AUS	Avaani Prakash	16	0	12+4	0
9	FW	(England) ENG	Millie Farrow	14	0	5+9	0
10	MF	(Australia) AUS	Tamar Levin	17	2	6+11	2
12	MF	(Australia) AUS	Tiana Fuller	11	0	1+10	0
13	DF	(Australia) AUS	Kaiya Buchanan	10	0	6+4	0
14	MF	(Australia) AUS	Greta Kraszula	20	0	20	0
15	GK	(Australia) AUS	Annalee Grove	16	0	15+1	0
16	MF	(Australia) AUS	Tess Quilligan	15	0	12+3	0
17	FW	(Australia) AUS	Jynaya dos Santos	9	1	5+4	1
18	DF	(Australia) AUS	Taren King	19	0	19	0
19	MF	(Australia) AUS	Jaya Bowman	1	0	0+1	0
21	FW	(Australia) AUS	Eliza Familton	10	2	3+7	2
22	MF	(Australia) AUS	Peta Trimis	18	5	18	5
23	DF	(Switzerland) SUI	Lorena Baumann	19	0	19	0
25	DF	(United States) USA	Blake Hughes	5	0	0+5	0
26	MF	(Australia) AUS	Isabella Coco-Di Sipio	11	2	11	2
77	DF	(United States) USA	Cannon Clough	3	0	1+2	0
Player(s) transferred out but featured this season
11	FW	(Australia) AUS	Annalise Rasmussen	14	11	11+3	11

=== Clean sheets ===
Includes all competitions. The list is sorted by squad number when total clean sheets are equal. Numbers in parentheses represent games where both goalkeepers participated and both kept a clean sheet; the number in parentheses is awarded to the goalkeeper who was substituted on, whilst a full clean sheet is awarded to the goalkeeper who was on the field at the start of play. Goalkeepers with no clean sheets not included in the list.

As of match played 4 April 2026

Rank	No.	Nat.	Goalkeeper	A-League Women	Total
1	15	(Australia)	Annalee Grove	3	3
2	1	(Australia)	Sarah Langman	1	1
Total				4	4

== See also ==
- 2025–26 Central Coast Mariners FC season
