= 2024–25 Central Coast Mariners FC (women) season =

Central Coast Mariners (women)
2024–25 season
- Chairman: Richard Peil
- Head Coach: Emily Husband
- Stadium: Industree Group Stadium
- A-League Women: 4th
- A-League Women Finals: Champions
- Top goalscorer: League: Annalise Rasmussen; Tiana Fuller (6 each); All: Isabel Gomez; Jade Pennock (7 each)
- Highest home attendance: 3,000 vs. Sydney FC (2 November 2024); A-League Women
- Lowest home attendance: 723 vs. Canberra United (30 November 2024); A-League Women
- Average home league attendance: 1,862
- Biggest win: 3–1 vs. Sydney FC (H) (2 November 2024); A-League Women
- Biggest defeat: 1–2 vs. Brisbane Roar (A) (15 December 2024); A-League Women
Home colours	Away colours	Third colours
- All statistics correct as of 15 December 2024.

The 2024–25 season was the Central Coast Mariners's fourth season of soccer in the A-League Women.

== Players ==
Note: Flags indicate national team as defined under FIFA eligibility rules; some limited exceptions apply. Players may hold more than one non-FIFA nationality.

No.	Pos.	Nation	Player
1	GK	AUS	Sarah Langman
2	DF	AUS	Jessica Seaman (injury replacement)
3	DF	AUS	Ash Irwin
4	DF	AUS	Jessika Nash
5	DF	AUS	Annabel Martin
6	MF	AUS	Isabel Gomez
7	FW	ENG	Jade Pennock (on loan from Birmingham City)
8	MF	CRO	Bianca Galic
10	MF	AUS	Taylor Ray
11	FW	AUS	Annalise Rasmussen
12	MF	AUS	Tiana Fuller (scholarship)
13	MF	IRL	Sarah Rowe

No.	Pos.	Nation	Player
14	MF	AUS	Greta Kraszula
16	MF	AUS	Tess Quilligan
17	GK	AUS	Teresa Morrissey
18	DF	AUS	Taren King (captain)
19	DF	AUS	Leia Puxty
20	GK	AUS	Chloe Carmichael (scholarship)
21	FW	ENG	Brooke Nunn
22	FW	AUS	Peta Trimis
23	FW	AUS	Lily McMahon (scholarship)
24	FW	AUS	Shadeene Evans
25	DF	USA	Blake Hughes
—	FW	AUS	Eliza Familton (scholarship)

== Transfers ==
=== Transfers in ===
No.	Position	Player	From	Type/fee	Contract length	Date	Ref
10	MF	Taylor Ray	Unattached	Free transfer	1 year	15 August 2024	
7	FW	(England) Jade Pennock	(England) Birmingham City	Loan	1 year	20 September 2024	
21	FW	(England) Brooke Nunn	(Scotland) Hibernian	Free transfer	1 year	22 September 2024	
4	DF	Jessika Nash	Unattached	Free transfer	1 year	25 September 2024	
2	DF	(United States) Brianne Riley	Unattached	Free transfer	1 year	4 October 2024	
19	DF	Leia Puxty	(Australia) UNSW FC	Free transfer	1 year	13 October 2024	
12	MF	Tiana Fuller	(Australia) Football NSW Institute	Scholarship	1 year	13 October 2024	
23	FW	Lily McMahon	(Australia) Northern Tigers	Scholarship	1 year	13 October 2024	
17	GK	Teresa Morrissey	(Australia) Macarthur Rams	Free transfer	1 year	31 October 2024	
13	MF	(Republic of Ireland) Sarah Rowe	(Australia) Collingwood (AFLW)	Free transfer	7 months	12 December 2024	
14	MF	Greta Kraszula	(United States) VCU Rams	Free transfer	6 months	27 December 2024	
2	DF	Jessica Seaman	Unattached	Injury replacement	5 months	26 January 2025	

==== From academy squad ====
N	Pos.	Nat.	Name	Age	Notes
	FW	(Australia)	Eliza Familton	17	scholarship contract
25	DF	(United States)	Blake Hughes	17	

=== Transfers out ===
No.	Position	Player	Transferred to	Type/fee	Date	Ref
14	DF	Sophie Nenadovic	Unattached	End of contract	1 July 2024	
10	FW	(United States) Rola Badawiya	Unattached	End of contract	10 July 2024	
12	FW	(United States) Jazmin Wardlow	Unattached	End of contract	10 July 2024	
13	DF	Alexia Karrys-Stahl	Unattached	End of contract	24 July 2024	
16	MF	(Mexico) Briana Woodall	Unattached	End of contract	24 July 2024	
19	MF	Tiarna Karambasis	Unattached	End of contract	24 July 2024	
27	DF	Maya Lobo	Unattached	End of contract	24 July 2024	
2	DF	(England) Faye Bryson	Unattached	End of contract	12 August 2024	
4	FW	Paige Hayward	Unattached	End of contract	12 August 2024	
17	FW	Kyah Simon	Unattached	End of contract	12 August 2024	
92	GK	Casey Dumont	Unattached	End of contract	12 August 2024	
9	FW	(China) Wurigumula	(China) Changchun Dazhong	End of loan	28 August 2024	
2	DF	(United States) Brianne Riley	Unattached	Mutual contract termination	30 December 2024	

=== Contract extensions ===
No.	Player	Position	Duration	Date	Ref.
11	Annalise Rasmussen	Forward	2 years	16 August 2024	
3	Ash Irwin	Defender	1 year	17 August 2024	
6	Isabel Gomez	Midfielder	2 years	19 August 2024	
22	Peta Trimis	Forward	2 years	29 August 2024	
18	Taren King	Defender	2 years	28 September 2024	
20	Chloe Carmichael	Goalkeeper	1 year (scholarship)	29 September 2024	
24	Shadeene Evans	Forward	1 year	12 October 2024	
16	Tess Quilligan	Midfielder	2 years	12 October 2024	
5	Annabel Martin	Defender		23 October 2024	

== Pre-season and friendlies ==
13 October 2024	Newcastle Jets (Australia)	0–2	(Australia) Central Coast Mariners	Cessnock, Australia
14:00 AEST		Report	Nunn; Trimis	Stadium: Cessnock Sportsground

== Competitions ==
=== Overall record ===
Competition	First match	Last match	Final position	Record							
Competition	First match	Last match	Final position	Pld	W	D	L	GF	GA	GD	Win %
A-League Women	2 November 2024	19 April 2025	4th	23	9	7	7	31	25	+6	39.13
A-League Women Finals	28 April 2025	18 May 2025	Winners	4	2	2	0	6	4	+2	50.00
Total				27	11	9	7	37	29	+8	40.74

Last updated: 18 May 2025
Source: Competitions

=== A-League Women ===
==== League table ====
Pos	Team	Pld	W	D	L	GF	GA	GD	Pts	Qualification
2	Melbourne Victory	23	16	5	2	42	21	+21	53	Qualification for Finals series
3	Adelaide United	23	14	3	6	44	30	+14	45	Qualification for Finals series
4	Central Coast Mariners (C)	23	9	7	7	31	25	+6	34	Qualification for Finals series
5	Canberra United	23	9	6	8	28	31	−3	33	Qualification for Finals series
6	Western United	23	9	6	8	39	46	−7	33	Qualification for Finals series

Source: A-Leagues
Rules for classification: 1) points; 2) goal difference; 3) goals scored; 4) wins; 5) head-to-head results; 5a) head-to-head points; 5b) head-to-head goal difference; 6) Fair Play points; 7) away goal difference; 8) away goals per match; 9) home goal difference; 10) home goals per match; 11) toss of a coin in an event of a tie of two clubs.
(C) Champions

==== Results summary ====
Overall								Home						Away					
Pld	W	D	L	GF	GA	GD	Pts	W	D	L	GF	GA	GD	W	D	L	GF	GA	GD
23	10	7	6	31	25	+6	37	6	3	3	19	15	+4	4	4	3	12	10	+2

Last updated: 19 April 2025.
Source: Soccerway
Home figures include Central Coast Mariners' 1–1 draw on neutral ground in Unite Round against Melbourne Victory on 23 November 2024.

==== Results by round ====
Round	1	2	3	4	5	6	7	8	9	10	11	12	13	14	15	16	17	18	19	20	21	22	23
Ground	H	A	A	N	H	A	H	A	H	H	A	A	H	H	A	A	H	A	H	A	H	H	A
Result	W	D	D	D	W	L	L	W	D	L	W	D	W	W	D	L	L	L	D	W	W	L	W
Position	3	4	6	6	5	5	7	5	5	7	6	6	5	5	6	6	6	6	6	5	5	5	4
Points	3	4	5	6	9	9	9	12	13	13	16	17	20	23	24	24	24	24	25	28	31	31	34

Updated to match(es) played on 20 April 2025. Source: Soccerway
A = Away; H = Home; N = Neutral; W = Win; D = Draw; L = Loss

==== Matches ====
Win Draw Loss

All times are in local time (AEST/AEDT).

2 November 2024 1	Central Coast Mariners	3–1	Sydney FC	Gosford
14:15	Pennock 41' (pen.); Gomez 62'; Galic 87'	Report	Ibini 83'	Stadium: Industree Group Stadium; Attendance: 3,000; Referee: Casey Reibelt

8 November 2024 2	Western United	0–0	Central Coast Mariners	Melbourne
19:00		Report		Stadium: Ironbark Fields; Attendance: 617; Referee: Mikayla Ryan

16 November 2024 3	Melbourne City	2–2	Central Coast Mariners	Melbourne
15:00	Apostolakis 3'; Bosch 33'	Report	Rasmussen 5'; Gomez 76'	Stadium: ctrl:cyber Pitch; Attendance: 562; Referee: Kelly Jones

23 November 2024 4	Central Coast Mariners	1–1	Melbourne Victory	Sydney
14:15	Rasmussen 12'	Report	Morrison 85'	Stadium: Netstrata Jubilee Stadium (Note: Match moved from Leichhardt Oval following a pitch assessment.); Attendance: 1,238; Referee: Georgia Ghirardello

30 November 2024 5	Central Coast Mariners	2–1	Canberra United	Gosford
16:00	Fuller 62'; Evans 68'	Report	Markovski 38'	Stadium: Industree Group Stadium; Attendance: 723; Referee: Mikayla Ryan

15 December 2024 6	Brisbane Roar	2–1	Central Coast Mariners	Brisbane
18:00	De la Harpe 57'; Yallop 80'	Report	Fuller 76'	Stadium: Perry Park; Attendance: 751; Referee: Isabella Mossin
Note: Match originally scheduled for 14 December, but postponed due to wet weather. It was rescheduled for 15 December.

22 December 2024 7	Central Coast Mariners	1–3	Western United	Gosford
17:00	Rasmussen 89'	Report	Johnson 57', 60'; Maher 87'	Stadium: Industree Group Stadium; Attendance: 965; Referee: Kelly Jones

27 December 2024 8	Perth Glory	0–1	Central Coast Mariners	Perth
20:00		Report	Pennock 85'	Stadium: Sam Kerr Football Centre; Attendance: 2,464; Referee: Rebecca Durcau

31 December 2024 9	Central Coast Mariners	0–0	Melbourne City	Gosford
16:15		Report		Stadium: Industree Group Stadium; Attendance: 5,108; Referee: Georgia Ghirardello

4 January 2025 10	Central Coast Mariners	0–1	Adelaide United	Woy Woy
17:00		Report	E. Hodgson 9'	Stadium: Woy Woy Oval; Attendance: 981; Referee: Page Malau-Aduli

12 January 2025 11	Western Sydney Wanderers	1–3	Central Coast Mariners	Sydney
17:00	Price 90+3'	Report	Nunn 10'; Quilligan 23'; Galic 69' (pen.)	Stadium: Wanderers Football Park; Attendance: 892; Referee: Sarah Jones

19 January 2025 12	Sydney FC	0–0	Central Coast Mariners	Sydney
17:00		Report		Stadium: Leichhardt Oval; Attendance: 2,109; Referee: Kelly Jones

26 January 2025 13	Central Coast Mariners	1–0	Wellington Phoenix	Woy Woy
17:00	Fuller 54'	Report		Stadium: Woy Woy Oval; Attendance: 721; Referee: Rachael Mitchenson

1 February 2025 14	Central Coast Mariners	5–1	Newcastle Jets	Gosford
16:50	Nunn 8'; Galic 33'; Fuller 49'; Pennock 53'; Trimis 90+3'	Report	J. Allan 30'	Stadium: Industree Group Stadium; Attendance: 3,742; Referee: Bec Mackie

8 February 2025 15	Canberra United	1–1	Central Coast Mariners	Canberra
17:00	Heyman 46'	Report	Pennock 39'	Stadium: McKellar Park; Attendance: 1,376; Referee: Caitlin Williams

16 February 2025 16	Melbourne Victory	2–0	Central Coast Mariners	Melbourne
17:00	Gielnik 10', 46'	Report		Stadium: The Home of the Matildas; Attendance: 887; Referee: Caitlin Williams

28 February 2025 17	Central Coast Mariners	1–2	Western Sydney Wanderers	Gosford
16:50	Gomez 68'	Report	Price 80'; Caspers 90+3'	Stadium: Industree Group Stadium; Attendance: 1,346; Referee: Isabella Mossin

8 March 2025 18	Adelaide United	1–0	Central Coast Mariners	Adelaide
19:45	Healy 50'	Report		Stadium: Coopers Stadium; Attendance: 8,582; Referee: Izzy Cooper

14 March 2025 19	Central Coast Mariners	3–3	Perth Glory	Gosford
19:00	Nash 19'; Rasmussen 62'; Fuller 70'	Report	O'Donoghue 49', 56'; McKenna 90+3'	Stadium: Industree Group Stadium; Attendance: 1,115; Referee: Molly Godsell

22 March 2025 20	Wellington Phoenix	0–2	Central Coast Mariners	Wellington
14:00		Report	Rasmussen 45' (pen.); Gomez 52'	Stadium: Porirua Park; Attendance: 765; Referee: Georgia Ghirardello

30 March 2025 21	Central Coast Mariners	2–1	Brisbane Roar	Gosford
17:45	Gomez 22'; Rasmussen 71'	Report	L. Freier 1'	Stadium: Industree Group Stadium; Referee: Isabella Mossin

11 April 2025 22	Central Coast Mariners	0–1	Melbourne Victory	Gosford
19:00		Report	Bunge 58'	Stadium: Industree Group Stadium; Attendance: 826; Referee: Page Malau-Aduli

19 April 2025 23	Newcastle Jets	1–2	Central Coast Mariners	Maitland
16:00	Jackson 57'	Report	Fuller 78'; Pennock 83'	Stadium: Maitland Regional Sportsground; Attendance: 1,479; Referee: Mikayla Ryan

==== Finals series ====
28 April 2025 (Note: Originally scheduled for 27 April, this match was postponed and rescheduled due to a waterlogged pitch.) Elimination-final	Central Coast Mariners	2–1	Canberra United	Gosford
18:00 AEST	Pennock 46', 74'	Report	Heyman 43'	Stadium: Industree Group Stadium; Attendance: 1,502; Referee: Izzy Cooper

3 May 2025 Semi-finals 1st leg	Central Coast Mariners	2–2	Melbourne City	Gosford
14:15 AEST	Nunn 20', 54'	Report	McKenna 29'; Henry 35'	Stadium: Industree Group Stadium; Attendance: 1,934; Referee: Georgia Ghirardello

11 May 2025 Semi-finals 2nd leg	Melbourne City	0–1 (a.e.t.) (2–3 agg.)	Central Coast Mariners	Melbourne
17:00 AEST		Report	Gomez 120+1'	Stadium: ctrl:cyber Pitch; Referee: Molly Godsell

18 May 2025 Grand Final	Melbourne Victory	1–1 (a.e.t.) (4–5 p)	Central Coast Mariners	Melbourne
15:15 AEST	Bunge 80'	Report	Gomez 46'	Stadium: AAMI Park; Attendance: 6,568; Referee: Izzy Cooper
	Penalties
	Jancevski (penalty missed); Gielnik (penalty scored); Chidiac (penalty scored); Furphy (penalty scored); Morrison (penalty scored)		(penalty scored) Fuller; (penalty scored) Trimis; (penalty scored) Pennock; (penalty scored) Gomez; (penalty scored) Galic

== Statistics ==
=== Appearances and goals ===
Includes all competitions. Players with no appearances not included in the list.

As of match played 18 May 2025

No.	Pos	Nat	Player	Total		A-League Women		A-League Women Finals	
No.	Pos	Nat	Player	Apps	Goals	Apps	Goals	Apps	Goals
1	GK	(Australia) AUS	Sarah Langman	27	0	23	0	4	0
2	DF	(United States) USA	Brianne Riley	5	0	5	0	0	0
2	DF	(Australia) AUS	Jessica Seaman	5	0	4+1	0	0	0
3	DF	(Australia) AUS	Ash Irwin	8	0	8	0	0	0
4	DF	(Australia) AUS	Jessika Nash	27	1	23	1	4	0
5	DF	(Australia) AUS	Annabel Martin	27	0	23	0	4	0
6	MF	(Australia) AUS	Isabel Gomez	16	7	11+1	5	4	2
7	FW	(England) ENG	Jade Pennock	27	7	23	5	4	2
8	MF	(Croatia) CRO	Bianca Galic	24	3	18+2	3	4	0
10	MF	(Australia) AUS	Taylor Ray	26	0	23	0	3	0
11	FW	(Australia) AUS	Annalise Rasmussen	27	6	18+5	6	4	0
12	FW	(Australia) AUS	Tiana Fuller	23	6	3+16	6	1+3	0
13	MF	(Republic of Ireland) IRL	Sarah Rowe	20	0	15+1	0	3+1	0
14	MF	(Australia) AUS	Greta Kraszula	13	0	1+8	0	2+2	0
16	MF	(Australia) AUS	Tess Quilligan	20	1	10+9	1	0+1	0
18	DF	(Australia) AUS	Taren King	6	0	0+2	0	3+1	0
19	DF	(Australia) AUS	Leia Puxty	15	0	3+11	0	0+1	0
21	FW	(England) ENG	Brooke Nunn	27	4	21+2	2	4	2
22	FW	(Australia) AUS	Peta Trimis	27	1	14+9	1	0+4	0
23	FW	(Australia) AUS	Lily McMahon	8	0	0+8	0	0	0
24	FW	(Australia) AUS	Shadeene Evans	17	1	7+9	1	0+1	0
25	DF	(United States) USA	Blake Hughes	8	0	0+5	0	0+3	0

=== Disciplinary record ===
Includes all competitions. The list is sorted by squad number when total cards are equal. Players with no cards not included in the list.

As of match played 15 December 2024

Rank	No.	Pos.	Nat.	Name	A-League Women			Total							
Rank	No.	Pos.	Nat.	Name	Yellow card	(yellow card) (yellow-red card)	Red card	Yellow card	(yellow card) (yellow-red card)	Red card					
Rank	No.	Pos.	Nat.	Name	1	7	FW	(England)	Jade Pennock	2	0	0	2	0	0
2	2	DF	(United States)	Brianne Riley	1	0	0	1	0	0					
2	6	MF	(Australia)	Isabel Gomez	1	0	0	1	0	0					
2	10	MF	(Australia)	Taylor Ray	1	0	0	1	0	0					
2	24	FW	(Australia)	Shadeene Evans	1	0	0	1	0	0					
Total					6	0	0	6	0	0					

=== Clean sheets ===
Includes all competitions. The list is sorted by squad number when total clean sheets are equal. Numbers in parentheses represent games where both goalkeepers participated and both kept a clean sheet; the number in parentheses is awarded to the goalkeeper who was substituted on, whilst a full clean sheet is awarded to the goalkeeper who was on the field at the start of play. Goalkeepers with no clean sheets not included in the list.

As of match played 18 May 2025

Rank	No.	Nat.	Goalkeeper	A-League Women	A-League Women Finals	Total
1	1	(Australia)	Sarah Langman	6	1	7

== See also ==
- 2024–25 Central Coast Mariners FC season
