= 2023–24 Central Coast Mariners FC (women) season =

Central Coast Mariners (A-League Women)
2023–24 season
- Chairman: Richard Peil
- Manager: Emily Husband
- Stadium: Industree Group Stadium
- A-League Women: 5th
- A-League Women Finals: Semi-finals
- Top goalscorer: League: Wurigumula (8); All: Wurigumula (8)
- Highest home attendance: 5,735 vs. Newcastle Jets (14 October 2023); A-League Women
- Lowest home attendance: 1,273 vs. Melbourne CIty (15 December 2023); A-League Women
- Average home league attendance: 3,015
- Biggest win: 3–0 vs. Canberra United (A) (23 December 2023); A-League Women
- Biggest defeat: 0–3 vs. Western Sydney Wanderers (A) (8 December 2023); A-League Women; 0–3 vs. Melbourne City (A) (23 March 2024); A-League Women
Home colours	Away colours	Third colours
- All statistics correct as of 27 April 2024.

The 2023–24 season was the third season of soccer in the history of the Central Coast Mariners (A-League Women). The club rejoined the A-League Women, formerly known as the W-League, after originally competing in the first two seasons of the competition.

== Players ==
Note: Flags indicate national team as defined under FIFA eligibility rules; some limited exceptions apply. Players may hold more than one non-FIFA nationality.

No.	Pos.	Nation	Player
1	GK	AUS	Sarah Langman
2	DF	ENG	Faye Bryson
3	DF	AUS	Ash Irwin
4	FW	AUS	Paige Hayward
5	DF	AUS	Annabel Martin
6	MF	AUS	Isabel Gomez
8	MF	CRO	Bianca Galic
9	FW	CHN	Wurigumula (on loan from Changchun Jiuyin Loans)
10	FW	USA	Rola Badawiya
11	FW	AUS	Annalise Rasmussen
12	FW	USA	Jazmin Wardlow
13	DF	AUS	Alexia Karrys-Stahl

No.	Pos.	Nation	Player
14	DF	AUS	Sophie Nenadovic
16	MF	MEX	Briana Woodall
17	FW	AUS	Kyah Simon
18	DF	AUS	Taren King (captain)
19	MF	AUS	Tiarna Karambasis
20	GK	AUS	Chloe Carmichael (scholarship)
22	FW	AUS	Peta Trimis
24	FW	AUS	Shadeene Evans
27	DF	AUS	Maya Lobo (scholarship)
33	MF	AUS	Tess Quilligan (scholarship)
92	GK	AUS	Casey Dumont

== Transfers ==
=== Transfers in ===
No.	Position	Player	Transferred from	Type/fee	Contract length	Date	Ref
8	MF	(Croatia) Bianca Galic	(Australia) Sydney University	Free transfer	2 years	1 August 2023	
10	FW	(United States) Rola Badawiya	(Australia) NWS Spirit	Free transfer	1 year	3 August 2023	
1	GK	Sarah Langman	Perth Glory	Free transfer	2 years	4 August 2023	
6	MF	Isabel Gomez	(Australia) Northern Tigers	Free transfer	1 year	4 August 2023	
27	DF	Maya Lobo	(Australia) Macarthur Rams	Scholarship	1 year	5 August 2023	
22	FW	Peta Trimis	(Australia) Bulls FC Academy	Scholarship	1 year	5 August 2023	
33	MF	Tess Quilligan	(Australia) Sydney University	Scholarship	1 year	5 August 2023	
5	DF	Annabel Martin	Unattached	Free transfer	2 years	5 August 2023	
18	DF	Taren King	Newcastle Jets	Free transfer	1 year	17 August 2023	
4	FW	Paige Hayward	Adelaide United	Free transfer	1 year	23 August 2023	
12	DF	(United States) Jazmin Wardlow	(Italy) Fiorentina	Free transfer	1 year	26 August 2023	
24	FW	Shadeene Evans	Unattached	Free transfer	1 year	9 September 2023	
3	DF	Ash Irwin	(Australia) Sydney Olympic	Free transfer	1 year	10 September 2023	
14	DF	Sophie Nenadovic	Unattached	Free transfer	1 year	10 September 2023	
17	FW	Kyah Simon	Unattached	Free transfer	1 year	22 September 2023	
19	MF	Tiarna Karambasis	(Australia) Lions FC	Free transfer	1 year	22 September 2023	
2	DF	(England) Faye Bryson	Unattached	Free transfer	1 year	23 September 2023	
20	GK	Chloe Carmichael	(Australia) Nepean FC	Scholarship	1 year	23 September 2023	
9	FW	(China) Wurigumula	(China) Changchun Jiuyin Loans	Loan	1 year	29 September 2023	
13	DF	Alexia Karrys-Stahl	(Australia) Bankstown City	Free transfer	1 year	7 October 2023	
30	GK	Courtney Newbon	(Australia) Sydney Olympic	Free transfer		14 October 2023	
92	GK	Casey Dumont	(Australia) Hawthorn (AFLW)	Free transfer	7 months	11 November 2023	
16	MF	(Mexico) Briana Woodall	(Mexico) Club León	Free transfer	7 months	18 November 2023	

==== From academy squad ====
N	Pos.	Nat.	Name	Age	Notes
11	MF	(Australia)	Annalise Rasmussen	18	Senior contract

=== Transfers out ===
No.	Position	Player	Transferred to	Type/fee	Date	Ref
30	GK	Courtney Newbon	Unattached	End of contract	2 December 2023	

=== Contract extensions ===
No.	Player	Position	Duration	Date	Notes	Ref.
22	Peta Trimis	Forward	5 months	20 January 2024	Signed a new full senior contract until the end of the 2023–24 season, replacing her scholarship contract.	

== Pre-season and friendlies ==
Win Loss

24 September 2023	Newcastle Jets (Australia)	2–3	(Australia) Central Coast Mariners	Tamworth
11:00 AEST	Hammond 69'; Haban 72'	Report	Badawiya 16'; Wardlow 64'; Rasmussen 80'	Stadium: Scully Park

7 October 2023	Central Coast Mariners (Australia)	2–3	(New Zealand) Wellington Phoenix	Gosford
16:00 AEDT	Trimis (?); Galic (?)	Report	Main (?); Elliott (?); Knott (?)	Stadium: Industree Group Stadium; Attendance: ~3,000

== Competitions ==
=== Overall record ===
Competition	First match	Last match	Starting round	Final position	Record							
Competition	First match	Last match	Starting round	Final position	Pld	W	D	L	GF	GA	GD	Win %
A-League Women	14 October 2023	30 March 2024	Matchday 1	5th	22	10	5	7	31	24	+7	45.45
A-League Women Finals	14 April 2024	27 April 2024	Elimination-finals	Semi-finals	3	0	2	1	1	2	−1	0.00
Total					25	10	7	8	32	26	+6	40.00

Last updated: 27 April 2024
Source: Competitions

=== A-League Women ===
==== League table ====
Pos	Team	Pld	W	D	L	GF	GA	GD	Pts	Qualification
3	Western United	22	11	3	8	37	34	+3	36	Qualification to Finals series
4	Melbourne Victory	22	10	6	6	44	29	+15	36	Qualification to Finals series
5	Central Coast Mariners	22	10	5	7	31	24	+7	35	Qualification to Finals series
6	Newcastle Jets	22	10	3	9	43	36	+7	33	Qualification to Finals series
7	Western Sydney Wanderers	22	10	3	9	30	30	0	33	

Source: A-Leagues
Rules for classification: 1) points; 2) wins; 3) goal difference; 4) goals scored; 5) head-to-head results; 6) Fair Play points; 7) away head-to-head results; 8) home head-to-head results; 9) toss of a coin

==== Results summary ====
Overall								Home						Away					
Pld	W	D	L	GF	GA	GD	Pts	W	D	L	GF	GA	GD	W	D	L	GF	GA	GD
21	9	5	7	29	23	+6	32	3	5	3	13	10	+3	6	0	4	16	13	+3

Source: Ultimate A-League

==== Results by round ====
Round	1	2	4	5	6	7	8	9	10	11	12	3	13	14	15	16	17	18	19	20	21	22
Ground	H	A	H	H	A	A	H	A	H	H	N	A	H	A	A	H	A	H	A	H	A	H
Result	L	W	D	W	L	L	D	W	L	D	W	W	L	W	L	D	W	W	W	W	L	D
Position	10	6	6	5	6	10	10	7	9	10	9	4	7	5	7	7	5	5	5	4	4	5
Points	0	3	4	7	7	7	8	11	11	12	15	18	18	21	21	22	25	28	31	34	34	35

Source: Ultimate A-League
A = Away; H = Home; N = Neutral; W = Win; D = Draw; L = Loss

==== Matches ====
Win Draw Loss

14 October 2023 1	Central Coast Mariners	0–1	Newcastle Jets	Gosford
17:00 AEDT		Report	Ayres 81'	Stadium: Industree Group Stadium; Attendance: 5,735; Referee: Kate Jacewicz

20 October 2023 2	Adelaide United	1–2	Central Coast Mariners	Adelaide
16:30 ACDT	Tonkin 68'	Report	King 43'; Wurigumula 56'	Stadium: Coopers Stadium; Attendance: 3,185; Referee: Casey Reibelt

12 November 2023 4	Central Coast Mariners	1–1	Brisbane Roar	Gosford
14:15 AEDT	Badawiya 26'	Report	Norrie 27'	Stadium: Industree Group Stadium; Attendance: 3,281; Referee: Bec Mackie

18 November 2023 5	Central Coast Mariners	1–0	Wellington Phoenix	Gosford
18:00 AEDT	Rasmussen 76'	Report		Stadium: Industree Group Stadium; Attendance: 1,654; Referee: Azusa Sugino

26 November 2023 6	Melbourne Victory	2–1	Central Coast Mariners	Melbourne
14:00 AEDT	Okino 60'; Weinert 90+1'	Report	Bryson 71'	Stadium: The Home of the Matildas; Attendance: 1,056; Referee: Asaka Koizumi

8 December 2023 7	Western Sydney Wanderers	3–0	Central Coast Mariners	Sydney
19:00 AEDT	Harding 45+2', 69'; King 54' (o.g.)	Report		Stadium: Wanderers Football Park; Attendance: 968; Referee: Casey Reibelt

15 December 2023 8	Central Coast Mariners	1–1	Melbourne City	Gosford
19:30 AEDT	Badawiya 53'	Report	Stott 78'	Stadium: Industree Group Stadium; Attendance: 1,273; Referee: Caitlin Williams
Note: Match originally scheduled for 19:00 AEDT. It was rescheduled to 19:30 AEDT due to power outages.

23 December 2023 9	Canberra United	0–3	Central Coast Mariners	Canberra
17:00 AEDT		Report	Wurigumula 29', 69'; Trimis 74'	Stadium: McKellar Park; Attendance: 1,285; Referee: Isabella Libri

31 December 2023 10	Central Coast Mariners	1–2	Perth Glory	Gosford
16:15 AEDT	Badawiya 69'	Report	Farrow 7', 66'	Stadium: Industree Group Stadium; Attendance: 5,130; Referee: Kate Jacewicz

7 January 2024 11	Central Coast Mariners	0–0	Sydney FC	Gosford
18:00 AEDT		Report		Stadium: Industree Group Stadium; Attendance: 2,734; Referee: Isabella Blaess

12 January 2024 12	Wellington Phoenix	1–2	Central Coast Mariners	Sydney
19:45 AEDT	Main 3'	Report	Badawiya 23'; Trimis 34'	Stadium: Leichhardt Oval; Attendance: 1,938; Referee: Bec Mackie
Note: Originally scheduled for 13 January 2024, was moved due to Unite Round.

17 January 2024 3	Sydney FC	1–2	Central Coast Mariners	Sydney
19:00 AEDT	Hawkesby 90+2'	Report	McLean 34' (o.g.); Wurigumula 90+9'	Stadium: Leichhardt Oval; Attendance: 1,858; Referee: Bec Mackie
Note: Originally scheduled for 3 November 2023, this match was postponed due to Sydney FC's participation in the 2023 AFC Women's Club Championship. It was rescheduled for 17 January 2024.

21 January 2024 13	Central Coast Mariners	1–2	Western Sydney Wanderers	Gosford
18:00 AEDT	Gomez 48'	Report	Caspers 43'; Wardlow 54' (o.g.)	Stadium: Industree Group Stadium; Attendance: 2,733; Referee: Rebecca Durcau

28 January 2024 14	Newcastle Jets	0–2	Central Coast Mariners	Newcastle
17:00 AEDT		Report	Wurigumula 4'; Hayward 72'	Stadium: Newcastle Number 2 Sports Ground; Attendance: 3,023; Referee: Bec Mackie

3 February 2024 15	Western United	2–1	Central Coast Mariners	Hobart
14:15 AEDT	Sawicki 2'; Keane 28'	Report	Badawiya 6'	Stadium: North Hobart Oval; Attendance: 2,007; Referee: Isabella Blaess

10 February 2024 16	Central Coast Mariners	1–1	Melbourne Victory	Gosford
17:00 AEDT	Trimis 6'	Report	Gielnik 66'	Stadium: Industree Group Stadium; Attendance: 4,226; Referee: Caitlin Williams

18 February 2024 17	Perth Glory	1–3	Central Coast Mariners	Perth
19:00 AWST	Farrow 25'	Report	Simon 46'; Galic 76'; Rasmussen 83'	Stadium: Macedonia Park; Attendance: 901; Referee: Bec Mackie

3 March 2024 18	Central Coast Mariners	2–0	Adelaide United	Gosford
15:15 AEDT	Karambasis 50'; Wurigumula 64'	Report		Stadium: Industree Group Stadium; Attendance: 1,573; Referee: Georgia Ghirardello

9 March 2024 19	Brisbane Roar	0–2	Central Coast Mariners	Brisbane
15:00 AEST		Report	Wurigumula 45'; Simon 46'	Stadium: Ballymore Stadium; Attendance: 1,100; Referee: Casey Reibelt

17 March 2024 20	Central Coast Mariners	4–1	Canberra United	Gosford
15:00 AEDT	Wurigumula 4'; Badawiya 6', 35'; Simon 33' (pen.)	Report	Flannery 87'	Stadium: Industree Group Stadium; Attendance: 1,811; Referee: Caitlin Williams

23 March 2024 21	Melbourne City	3–0	Central Coast Mariners	Melbourne
16:00 AEDT	Wilkinson 24'; Ekic 28' (pen.); Otto 87'	Report		Stadium: City Football Academy; Attendance: 456; Referee: Kate Jacewicz

28 March 2024 22	Central Coast Mariners	1–1	Western United	Gosford
19:00 AEDT	Rasmussen 71'	Report	De Domizio 82'	Stadium: Industree Group Stadium; Attendance: 1,529; Referee: Rebecca Durcau

==== Finals series ====
14 April 2024 Elimination-finals	Melbourne Victory	0–0 (a.e.t.) (2–4 p)	Central Coast Mariners	Melbourne
16:00 AEST		Report		Stadium: The Home of the Matildas; Attendance: 1,722; Referee: Rebecca Durcau
	Penalties
	Lowe (penalty scored); Chidiac (penalty scored); Murphy (penalty missed); Zois (penalty missed)		(penalty scored) Dumont; (penalty scored) Bryson; (penalty scored) Wurigumula; (penalty scored) Galic

21 April 2024 Semi-finals 1st Leg	Central Coast Mariners	0–1	Sydney FC	Gosford
15:00 AEST		Report	Hawkesby 54'	Stadium: Industree Group Stadium; Attendance: 4,014; Referee: Isabella Mossin

27 April 2024 Semi-finals 2nd Leg	Sydney FC	1–1 (2–1 agg.)	Central Coast Mariners	Sydney
15:00 AEST	Hawkesby 30'	Report	Badawiya 43'	Stadium: Leichhardt Oval; Attendance: 7,063; Referee: Georgia Ghirardello

== Statistics ==
=== Appearances and goals ===
Includes all competitions. Players with no appearances not included in the list.

As of 27 April 2024

No.	Pos.	Nat.	Name	A-League Women				Total	
No.	Pos.	Nat.	Name	Regular season		Finals series		Total	
No.	Pos.	Nat.	Name	Apps	Goals	Apps	Goals	Apps	Goals
1	GK	(Australia)	Sarah Langman	9+1	0	0	0	10	0
2	DF	(England)	Faye Bryson	17+2	1	2	0	21	1
3	DF	(Australia)	Ash Irwin	21	0	3	0	24	0
4	MF	(Australia)	Paige Hayward	18+4	1	3	0	25	1
5	DF	(Australia)	Annabel Martin	15+3	0	3	0	21	0
6	MF	(Australia)	Isabel Gomez	20+1	1	3	0	24	1
8	DF	(Croatia)	Bianca Galic	22	1	3	0	25	1
9	FW	(China)	Wurigumula	18+4	8	3	0	25	8
10	FW	(United States)	Rola Badawiya	21+1	6	3	1	25	7
11	FW	(Australia)	Annalise Rasmussen	2+16	2	0+2	0	20	2
12	DF	(United States)	Jazmin Wardlow	21+1	0	3	0	25	0
13	DF	(Australia)	Alexia Karrys-Stahl	1+13	0	0	0	14	0
14	DF	(Australia)	Sophie Nenadovic	0+1	0	0	0	1	0
16	FW	(United States)	Briana Woodall	0+1	0	0	0	1	0
17	FW	(Australia)	Kyah Simon	6+3	3	3	0	12	3
18	MF	(Australia)	Taren King	10	1	0	0	10	1
19	MF	(Australia)	Tiarna Karambasis	10+6	1	1+1	0	18	1
22	FW	(Australia)	Peta Trimis	10+8	3	0+3	0	21	3
24	FW	(Australia)	Shadeene Evans	2+8	0	0+1	0	11	0
27	DF	(Australia)	Maya Lobo	0+1	0	0	0	1	0
30	GK	(Australia)	Courtney Newbon	4	0	0	0	4	0
33	MF	(Australia)	Tess Quilligan	7+2	0	0+1	0	10	0
92	GK	(Australia)	Casey Dumont	9	0	3	0	12	0

=== Disciplinary record ===
Includes all competitions. The list is sorted by squad number when total cards are equal. Players with no cards not included in the list.

As of 21 April 2024

Rank	No.	Pos.	Nat.	Name	A-League Women						Total		
Rank	No.	Pos.	Nat.	Name	Regular season			Finals series			Total		
Rank	No.	Pos.	Nat.	Name	Yellow card	(yellow card) (yellow-red card)	Red card	Yellow card	(yellow card) (yellow-red card)	Red card	Yellow card	(yellow card) (yellow-red card)	Red card
1	2	DF	(England)	Faye Bryson	4	1	0	0	0	0	4	1	0
2	1	GK	(Australia)	Sarah Langman	1	1	0	0	0	0	1	1	0
3	6	MF	(Australia)	Isabel Gomez	7	0	0	1	0	0	8	0	0
4	8	DF	(Croatia)	Bianca Galic	6	0	0	0	0	0	6	0	0
5	3	DF	(Australia)	Ash Irwin	4	0	0	1	0	0	5	0	0
6	4	MF	(Australia)	Paige Hayward	2	0	0	1	0	0	3	0	0
6	18	MF	(Australia)	Taren King	3	0	0	0	0	0	3	0	0
8	9	FW	(China)	Wurigumula	2	0	0	0	0	0	2	0	0
8	19	MF	(Australia)	Tiarna Karambasis	2	0	0	0	0	0	2	0	0
8	24	FW	(Australia)	Shadeene Evans	2	0	0	0	0	0	2	0	0
11	5	DF	(Australia)	Annabel Martin	1	0	0	0	0	0	1	0	0
11	11	FW	(Australia)	Annalise Rasmussen	1	0	0	0	0	0	1	0	0
11	12	DF	(United States)	Jazmin Wardlow	1	0	0	0	0	0	1	0	0
11	22	FW	(Australia)	Peta Trimis	1	0	0	0	0	0	1	0	0
Total					33	2	0	3	0	0	36	2	0

=== Clean sheets ===
Includes all competitions. The list is sorted by squad number when total clean sheets are equal. Numbers in parentheses represent games where both goalkeepers participated and both kept a clean sheet; the number in parentheses is awarded to the goalkeeper who was substituted on, whilst a full clean sheet is awarded to the goalkeeper who was on the field at the start of play. Goalkeepers with no clean sheets not included in the list.

As of 27 April 2024

Rank	No.	Nat.	Goalkeeper	A-League Women		Total
Rank	No.	Nat.	Goalkeeper	Regular season	Finals series	Total
1	92	(Australia)	Casey Dumont	3	1	4
2	1	(Australia)	Sarah Langman	3	0	3
Total				6	1	7

== See also ==
- 2023–24 Central Coast Mariners FC season
- List of Central Coast Mariners FC (women) seasons
