= List of Central Coast Mariners FC (women) records and statistics =

Central Coast Mariners Football Club (women) is an Australian professional women's association football club based in Tuggerah, Central Coast. The club was formed in 2008 joining the W-League (now A-League Women), before they left the competition from 2010–11 rejoining 2023–24.

The list encompasses the records set by the club, their head coaches and their players. The player records section itemises the club's leading goalscorers and those who have made most appearances in first-team competitions. Attendance records at Industree Group Stadium, and other relevant grounds are also included.

The club's record appearance maker is Bianca Galic who has currently made 34 appearances between 2023 and 2024. Michelle Heyman is Central Coast Mariners (women)'s record goalscorer, scoring 11 goals in total.

All figures are correct as of 31 December 2024.

== Honours ==
- A-League Women Premiership

Runners-up (1): 2009

== Player records ==
=== Appearances ===
- Most appearances: Bianca Galic, 34
- Youngest first-team player: Jenna Kingsley, 16 years, 250 days (against Newcastle Jets, 29 November 2008)
- Oldest first-team player: Kyah Simon, 32 years, 307 days (against Sydney FC, Semi-finals, 28 March 2024)
- Most consecutive appearances: Bianca Galic, 33 (from 14 October 2023 to 27 December 2024)

==== Most appearances ====
Competitive matches only, includes appearances as a substitute. Numbers in brackets indicate goals scored.

Rank	Player	Years	A-League Women		Total
Rank	Player	Years	Regular season	Finals series	Total
1	(Australia) Bianca Galic	2023–	31 (2)	3 (0)	34 (2)
2	(Australia) Ash Irwin	2023–	29 (0)	3 (0)	32 (0)
3	(Australia) Annabel Martin	2008–2009	27 (0)	3 (0)	30 (0)
3	(Australia) Annalise Rasmussen	2023–	28 (6)	2 (0)	30 (6)
3	(Australia) Peta Trimis	2023–	27 (3)	3 (0)	30 (3)
6	(Australia) Isabel Gomez	2023–	25 (3)	3 (0)	28 (3)
7	(Australia) Rola Badawiya	2023–2024	22 (7)	3 (1)	25 (8)
7	(United States) Jazmin Wardlow	2023–2024	22 (0)	3 (0)	25 (0)
7	(China) Wurigumula	2023–2024	22 (8)	3 (0)	25 (8)
10	(Australia) Paige Hayward	2023–2024	21 (1)	3 (0)	24 (1)

=== Goalscorers ===
- Most goals in a season: Michelle Heyman, 11 goals (in the 2009 season)
- Youngest goalscorer: Jenna Kingsley, 16 years, 257 days (against Adelaide United, 6 December 2008)
- Oldest goalscorer: Kyah Simon, 32 years, 266 days (against Canberra United, 17 March 2024)
- Most consecutive goalscoring appearances: Michelle Heyman, 4 (from 7 November 2009 to 27 November 2009)

==== Top goalscorers ====
Competitive matches only. Numbers in brackets indicate appearances made.

Rank	Player	Years	A-League Women		Total
Rank	Player	Years	Regular season	Finals series	Total
1	(Australia) Michelle Heyman	2009	11 (10)	0 (1)	11 (11)
2	(Australia) Rola Badawiya	2023–2024	7 (22)	1 (3)	8 (25)
2	(Australia) Kyah Simon	2008; 2024	8 (18)	0 (3)	8 (21)
2	(China) Wurigumula	2023–2024	8 (22)	0 (3)	8 (25)
5	(Australia) Annalise Rasmussen	2023–	6 (28)	0 (2)	6 (30)
6	(Australia) Trudy Camilleri	2008–2009	5 (19)	0 (1)	5 (20)
7	(United States) Kendall Fletcher	2009	4 (10)	0 (1)	4 (11)
7	(United States) Lydia Vandenbergh	2009	4 (10)	0 (1)	4 (11)
9	(Australia) Isabel Gomez	2023–	3 (25)	0 (3)	3 (28)
9	(Australia) Jenna Kingsley	2008–2009	3 (16)	0 (0)	3 (16)
9	(Australia) Renee Rollason	2008–2009	3 (21)	0 (0)	3 (21)
9	(Australia) Peta Trimis	2023–	3 (27)	0 (3)	3 (30)

== Head coach records ==
- First full-time head coach: Stephen Roche coached Central Coast Mariners (women) from September 2008 to June 2010
- Longest-serving head coach: Emily Husband – 2 years, 239 days (2 March 2023 to present).
- Shortest tunure as head coach: Stephen Roche – 1 year, 295 days (8 September 2008 to 30 June 2010).
- Highest win percentage: Stephen Roche, 52.38%
- Lowest win percentage: Emily Husband, 44.00%

== Club records ==
=== Matches ===
==== Firsts ====
- First match: Melbourne Victory 2–0 Central Coast Mariners, 25 October 2008
- First finals match: Central Coast Mariners 0–1 Brisbane Roar, Semi-finals, 13 December 2009
- First home match: Central Coast Mariners 3–1 Perth Glory, Parramatta Stadium, 1 November 2008

==== Record results ====
- Record win:
  - 6–0 against Adelaide United, 6 December 2008
  - 6–0 against Adelaide United, 14 November 2009
- Record defeat: 0–5 against Queensland Roar, 15 November 2008
- Record consecutive wins: 4
  - from 7 November 2009 to 27 November 2009
  - from 18 February 2024 to 17 March 2024
- Record consecutive defeats: 3
  - from 15 November 2008 to 29 November 2008
  - from 5 December 2009 to 14 October 2023
- Record consecutive matches without a defeat: 6, from 24 October 2009 to 27 November 2009
- Record consecutive matches without a win: 3
  - from 15 November 2008 to 29 November 2008
  - from 5 December 2009 to 14 October 2023
  - from 26 November 2023 to 15 December 2023
- Record consecutive matches without conceding a goal: 2
  - from 14 November 2009 to 21 November 2009
  - from 3 March 2024 to 9 March 2024
  - from 27 December 2024 to 31 December 2024
- Record consecutive matches without scoring a goal: 3, from 5 December 2009 to 14 October 2023

=== Goals ===
- Most league goals scored in a season: 24 in 22 matches, 2023–24
- Fewest league goals scored in a season: 15 in 10 matches, 2008–09
- Most league goals conceded in a season: 24 in 22 matches, 2023–24
- Fewest league goals conceded in a season: 7 in 10 matches, 2009

=== Points ===
- Most points in a season: 35 in 22 matches, 2023–24
- Fewest points in a season: 12 in 10 matches, 2008–09

=== Attendances ===
This section applies to attendances at Central Coast Stadium, and other relevant grounds.

- Highest attendance at Central Coast Stadium: 5,735, against Newcastle Jets, 14 October 2023
- Lowest attendance at Central Coast Stadium: 1,273, against Melbourne City, 15 December 2023
- Lowest attendance: 211, against Newcastle Jets, Campbelltown Stadium, 29 November 2008
