= List of Central Coast Mariners FC (women) seasons =

This is a list of seasons played by Central Coast Mariners FC (W-League), the women's section of Australian soccer club Central Coast Mariners since its creation in 2008.

== Key ==
Key to league competitions:

- W-League – Australia's top women's football league, established in 2008.

Key to colours and symbols:

1st or W	Winners
2nd or RU	Runners-up
3rd	Third
♦	Top scorer in division

Key to league record:

- Season = The year and article of the season
- Pos = Final position
- Pld = Games played
- W = Games won
- D = Games drawn
- L = Games lost
- GF = Goals scored
- GA = Goals against
- Pts = Points

Key to cup record:

- En-dash (–) = Central Coast Mariners Women did not participate
- SF = Semi-finals
- RU = Runners-up
- W = Winners

== Seasons ==
Results of league and cup competitions by season
Season	Division	P	W	D	L	F	A	Pts	Pos	Finals	Name	Goals
Season	League									Finals	Top goalscorer	
2008–09	W-League	10	4	0	6	15	20	12	6th	—	Kyah Simon	5
2009	W-League	10	7	1	2	24	7	21	2nd	SF	Michelle Heyman	11
2023–24	A-League Women	22	10	3	9	31	24	35	5th	SF	Wurigumula	8
2024–25	A-League Women	23	9	7	7	31	25	34	4th	W	Jade Pennock Isabel Gomez	7
