= F3 Derby =

Football association

The F3 Derby
- Location: Central Coast / Newcastle (Australia)
- Teams: Central Coast Mariners; Newcastle Jets
- First meeting: 7 May 2005; OFC Club Championship qualification Mariners 0–0 (4–2 p) Jets
- Latest meeting: 17 October 2026; A-League Men; Mariners 2–2 Jets
- Next meeting: 23 January 2027
- Broadcasters: Paramount+, Network 10
- Stadiums: Central Coast Stadium, McDonald Jones Stadium

Statistics
- Total meetings: 71
- Most wins: Central Coast Mariners (28)
- Most player appearances: John Hutchinson (31)
- Top scorer: Matt Simon (9)
- All-time series: Mariners: 28; Drawn: 22; Jets: 21
- Largest victory: Central Coast Mariners 2–8 Newcastle Jets (14 April 2018); Newcastle Jets 6–0 Central Coast Mariners (12 April 2025)

The F3 Derby is a soccer rivalry between Central Coast Mariners and Newcastle Jets. It is the longest standing derby in the A-League Men. The rivalry originated due to the team's relative geographical proximity, with the Mariners located on the Central Coast of New South Wales, the Jets in Newcastle, immediately to the north. The two clubs were also the only two clubs from outside capital cities in the inaugural A-League seasons, which contributed to the rivalry.

The teams first met in the Australian qualifying tournament for the 2005 OFC Club Championship, in what was the Mariners' first ever competitive game (the Jets having formed five years prior). Both sides have played in every season of the A-League since its inception, and the teams also met in the now-defunct A-League Pre-Season Challenge Cup. The rivalry was particularly strong in the 2007–08 A-League, where the teams occupied the top two positions in both the regular season and finals series. As of 25 April 2026, the teams have played a total of 71 times in league and cup matches since 2005, of which Central Coast have won 28, Newcastle have won 21, and 22 have been drawn.

The derby is named after the former name of the Pacific Motorway, which connects the two cities. The name has been retained despite the Motorway now being officially known as the M1.

== History of the rivalry ==
=== Early meetings ===
In November 2004, the clubs to participate in the newly formed A-League competition were announced by the Football Federation Australia. They included former National Soccer League club Newcastle Jets (previously known as Newcastle United) and Central Coast Mariners, the only regional club included in the new tournament. With no more than one club in any city in the inaugural competition, the F3 derby was the only local rivalry in the inaugural seasons of the A-League.

The teams first met in a qualification match for the 2005 OFC Club Championship. The Mariners won the match in a penalty shootout, after the game finished scoreless. The rivalry quickly became heated when the Mariners' Nik Mrdja broke Newcastle defender Andrew Durante's leg in a tackle late in the match.

=== Top of the league: 2007–08 ===
In the 2007–08 A-League, both teams had very strong seasons. The Mariners won their first A-League Premiership on goal difference from the Jets after winning on the final weekend of the competition. As a result, the Mariners were drawn against the Jets in the major semi-final – the winner over two legs to progress to the 2008 A-League Grand Final, the loser to play in the preliminary final in order to qualify for the Grand Final. In the first match, goals from Adam and Joel Griffiths gave the Jets a two-goal lead, the Mariners held scoreless after a missed penalty from striker John Aloisi. However, the Mariners turned the tie around in the second leg, winning 3–0 in extra time led by two goals from Sasho Petrovski to qualify for the Grand Final. Nonetheless, Newcastle qualified for the Final a week later, beating Adelaide United to ensure that the 2008 A-League Grand Final would be an F3 derby.

The 2008 A-League Grand Final was held at the Sydney Football Stadium, despite the Mariners having earned the right to host the game, due to the ground's higher seating capacity than Central Coast Stadium. The Jets took the lead midway through the second half, with Mark Bridge (who? It was definitely Griffo) scoring after capitalising on an error from Mariners defender Tony Vidmar, playing his final game before retirement. There was significant controversy with only minutes remaining when Newcastle midfielder James Holland made contact with his arm on the ball in his own penalty area. Despite appeals from Mariners players, referee Mark Shield did not award a penalty kick and Newcastle held on to win the match, winning their first A-League Championship. In the aftermath of this decision, Mariners goalkeeper Danny Vukovic struck Shield on the arm, and was shown a red card for his actions. He was subsequently suspended for multiple months, and, despite an initially successful appeal, not permitted to compete at the 2008 Summer Olympics. The attendance of 36,354 remains the Mariners highest home crowd of all time.

In 2013, the F3 was renamed as the M1, however, the derby is still officially referred to as the F3 derby.

In December 2022, the clubs unveiled a trophy given to the team with the better record in the derby meetings over the season. The trophy consisted of a core drill sample of the motorway.

=== Mariners 2–8 Jets ===
The 2017–18 A-League match between Central Coast Mariners and Newcastle Jets, took place on 14 April 2018. Newcastle Jets won 8–2, which is the joint highest scoring game in the history of the competition.

Heading into the final round of the regular season, Newcastle Jets had already secured second place, 14 points behind premiers Sydney FC and four points ahead Melbourne Victory. Central Coast Mariners were looking to avoid a second wooden spoon in three years, sitting two points ahead of Wellington Phoenix.

The match set the record as the highest scoring match in A-League history, previously set at nine when Adelaide United defeated North Queensland Fury 8–1. Newcastle Jets would go onto finish runner-up, losing to Melbourne Victory in the Grand Final, due to a controversy involving VAR. The record was later matched by Wellington Phoenix in the 2018–19 season, where they also beat the Mariners 8–2.

Immediately following the match, caretaker manager Wayne O'Sullivan was sacked by the club after four games, losing all of them. Since Wellington Phoenix won their final game, Central Coast Mariners finished bottom of the table, a feat they would repeat the following year, along with another 8–2 defeat, this time to Wellington Phoenix.

==== Statistics ====
Statistics	Central Coast Mariners	Newcastle Jets
Goals scored	2	8
Total shots	15	15
Ball possession	54.2%	45.8%
Corner kicks	4	4
Fouls	15	9
Offsides	3	5
Yellow cards	0	3
Red cards	0	0

== Women's F3 Derby ==
With the Central Coast Mariners' re-introduction to the A-League Women for the 2023–24 season, a new trophy was established by the two clubs which is made from a piece of guardrail from the M1 motorway. The opening round fixture between the Mariners and the Jets in October 2023 was the first women's F3 derby contested since 2009, when the Mariners last played in the competition.

== Records and statistics ==
=== Men's teams ===
==== Table ====
As of 18 October 2026

Competition	Played	Mariners wins	Drawn	Jets wins	Mariners goals	Jets goals
A-League Men	69	27	21	21	94	89
Oceania Club Championship qualifiers	1	0	1	0	0	0
Pre-Season Cup	1	1	0	0	2	1
Total	71	28	22	21	96	90

This table only includes competitive first-team games, excluding all pre-season games and friendlies.

==== Trophies ====
Trophy	Central Coast	Newcastle
A-League Men regular season	3	1
A-League Men championship	3	1
Australia Cup	0	1
Total	6	3

=== Women's teams ===
==== Table ====
As of 18 October 2026

Competition	Played	Mariners wins	Drawn	Jets wins	Mariners goals	Jets goals
A-League Women	9	7	0	2	25	11
Total	9	7	0	2	25	11

This table only includes competitive first-team games, excluding all pre-season games and friendlies.

==== Trophies ====
Trophy	Central Coast	Newcastle
A-League Women regular season	0	0
A-League Women championship	1	0
Total	1	0

== Results ==
=== Men's team ===
Competition	#	Date	Home team	Score	Away team	Goals (Mariners)	Goals (Jets)	Venue	Attendance^{a}
OFC Club Championship qualification	1	7 May 2005	Central Coast	0–0 (a.e.t.) (4–2 p)	Newcastle			Central Coast Stadium	9,809
2005–06 A-League	2	4 September 2005	Central Coast	1–1	Newcastle	Petrie (69)	Milicic (25)	Central Coast Stadium	5,917
2005–06 A-League	3	23 October 2005	Newcastle	1–0	Central Coast		Parisi (88)	Hunter Stadium	9,371
2005–06 A-League	4	31 December 2005	Central Coast	4–1	Newcastle	Gumprecht (4), Brown (34), Hutchinson (71, 82)	Coveny (85)	Central Coast Stadium	11,612
2005–06 A-League Finals	5	10 February 2006	Newcastle	0–1	Central Coast	Osman (75)		Hunter Stadium	10,236
2005–06 A-League Finals	6	17 February 2006	Central Coast	1–1	Newcastle	Heffernan (79)	Thompson (28)	Central Coast Stadium	17,429
2006 Pre-Season Cup	7	12 August 2006	Central Coast	2–1 (a.e.t.)	Newcastle	Petrie (53 pen.), O'Grady (96)	Coveny (25)	Central Coast Stadium	7,567
2006–07 A-League	8	23 September 2006	Central Coast	1–1	Newcastle	Hutchinson (12)	J. Griffiths (84)	Central Coast Stadium	8,439
2006–07 A-League	9	12 November 2006	Newcastle	3–1	Central Coast	Mori (40)	Bridge (6), Carle (17), Rodriguez (79)	Hunter Stadium	14,026
2006–07 A-League	10	5 January 2007	Newcastle	1–0	Central Coast		Rodriguez (25)	Hunter Stadium	14,828
2007–08 A-League	11	7 October 2007	Central Coast	1–1	Newcastle	Pondeljak (62)	Bridge (82)	Central Coast Stadium	12,622
2007–08 A-League	12	25 November 2007	Newcastle	0–0	Central Coast			Hunter Stadium	14,169
2007–08 A-League	13	12 January 2008	Central Coast	1–2	Newcastle	Kwasnik (9)	Holland (6), J. Griffiths (52)	Central Coast Stadium	19,238
2007–08 A-League Finals	14	27 January 2008	Newcastle	2–0	Central Coast		A. Griffiths (22), J. Griffiths (85 pen.)	Hunter Stadium	22,960
2007–08 A-League Finals	15	10 February 2008	Central Coast	3–0 (a.e.t.)	Newcastle	Kwasnik (37), Petrovski (74, 95)		Central Coast Stadium	19,112
2008 A-League Grand Final	16	24 February 2008	Central Coast	0–1	Newcastle		Bridge (64)	Sydney Football Stadium	36,354
2008–09 A-League	17	15 August 2008	Newcastle	1–1	Central Coast	Simon (87)	J. Griffiths (90 pen.)	Hunter Stadium	16,022
2008–09 A-League	18	24 October 2008	Central Coast	1–0	Newcastle	Macallister (33)		Central Coast Stadium	10,710
2008–09 A-League	19	26 December 2008	Newcastle	1–2	Central Coast	Petrovski (67), Simon (80)	J. Griffiths (9 pen.)	Hunter Stadium	11,413
2009–10 A-League	20	14 August 2009	Central Coast	1–1	Newcastle	Boogaard (50)	Song (47)	Central Coast Stadium	9,573
2009–10 A-League	21	23 October 2009	Newcastle	2–1	Central Coast	Kwasnik (19)	Bridges (8), Haliti (14)	Hunter Stadium	6,188
2009–10 A-League	22	8 February 2010	Central Coast	3–0	Newcastle	Boogaard (17), Kwasnik (50), Simon (72)		Central Coast Stadium	5,842
2010–11 A-League	23	24 November 2010	Newcastle	1–1	Central Coast	Simon (49)	Petrovski (90)	Hunter Stadium	7,730
2010–11 A-League	24	16 January 2011	Newcastle	0–2	Central Coast	Simon (14), Hutchinson (87)		Hunter Stadium	13,463
2010–11 A-League	25	13 February 2011	Central Coast	1–0	Newcastle	Perez (90)		Central Coast Stadium	13,463
2011–12 A-League	26	23 October 2011	Newcastle	1–0	Central Coast		Brockie (24)	Hunter Stadium	14,421
2011–12 A-League	27	10 December 2011	Central Coast	2–0	Newcastle	R. Griffiths (24), Simon (58)		Central Coast Stadium	10,643
2011–12 A-League	28	14 January 2012	Central Coast	1–1	Newcastle	Zwaanswijk (60)	Haliti (17)	Central Coast Stadium	10,904
2012–13 A-League	29	20 October 2012	Newcastle	2–1	Central Coast	Ibini-Isei (71)	R. Griffiths (4 pen.), Heskey (61)	Hunter Stadium	15,289
2012–13 A-League	30	8 December 2012	Newcastle	0–2	Central Coast	McBreen (48, 66)		Hunter Stadium	13,112
2012–13 A-League	31	19 January 2013	Central Coast	0–0	Newcastle			Central Coast Stadium	11,249
2013–14 A-League	32	2 November 2013	Newcastle	2–2	Central Coast	Flores (65), Sterjovski (80)	Neville (51), Pasfield (56 o.g.)	Hunter Stadium	13,744
2013–14 A-League	33	25 January 2014	Central Coast	3–0	Newcastle	Caceres (13), McBreen (31), Simon (45+2)		Central Coast Stadium	10,920
2013–14 A-League	34	15 March 2014	Central Coast	3–1	Newcastle	Bosnar (1), Ibini-Isei (6), Trifiro (88)	J. Griffiths (23)	Central Coast Stadium	7,455
2014–15 A-League	35	11 October 2014	Central Coast	1–0	Newcastle	Duke (90+2)		Central Coast Stadium	10,433
2014–15 A-League	36	30 November 2014	Newcastle	1–1	Central Coast	Vernes (55)	Montaño (48)	Hunter Stadium	11,031
2014–15 A-League	37	28 February 2015	Newcastle	0–0	Central Coast			Hunter Stadium	7,991
2015–16 A-League	38	14 November 2015	Newcastle	1–1	Central Coast	Sim (90+2)	Trifunović (83)	Hunter Stadium	9,422
2015–16 A-League	39	28 February 2016	Central Coast	0–1	Newcastle		Ugarkovic (57)	Central Coast Stadium	7,528
2015–16 A-League	40	9 April 2016	Central Coast	2–4	Newcastle	Ferreira (51 pen.), O'Donovan (76)	Nordstrand (1, 54), Alivodić (18), Poljak (79)	Central Coast Stadium	7,335
2016–17 A-League	41	20 November 2016	Newcastle	1–1	Central Coast	McGing (42)	Nordstrand (64)	McDonald Jones Stadium	11,238
2016–17 A-League	42	26 February 2017	Newcastle	1–1	Central Coast	Galloway (50)	Kokko (20)	McDonald Jones Stadium	9,423
2016–17 A-League	43	9 April 2017	Central Coast	2–0	Newcastle	Montgomery (32), Ferreira (51)		Central Coast Stadium	8,073
2017–18 A-League	44	7 October 2017	Central Coast	1–5	Newcastle	Asdrúbal (5)	O'Donovan (9 pen., 28, 38), Champness (81), Petratos (90)	Central Coast Stadium	12,044
2017–18 A-League	45	9 January 2018	Newcastle	2–0	Central Coast		Petratos (82), Rodríguez (90+2)	McDonald Jones Stadium	13,127
2017–18 A-League	46	14 April 2018	Central Coast	2–8	Newcastle	Pain (39), Buhagiar (80)	Champness (10), O'Donovan (20, 68 pen.), McGree (24, 53, 75), Jackson (61), Petratos (81)	Central Coast Stadium	7,604
2018–19 A-League	47	23 December 2018	Central Coast	1–2	Newcastle	Simon (36)	Hoffman (66), Vargas (82)	Central Coast Stadium	8,923
2018–19 A-League	48	23 January 2019	Newcastle	1–0	Central Coast		Sheppard (54)	McDonald Jones Stadium	9,466
2018–19 A-League	49	16 March 2019	Newcastle	2–3	Central Coast	Murray (51), Karacan (64), Pain (67)	O'Donovan (74), Vargas (81)	McDonald Jones Stadium	8,173
2019–20 A-League	50	19 October 2019	Central Coast	1–1	Newcastle	Đurić (4)	Petratos (56 pen.)	Central Coast Stadium	8,910
2019–20 A-League	51	9 February 2020	Newcastle	4–3	Central Coast	Tongyik (45), Clisby (49), Harold (86)	Petratos (15, 52), Topor-Stanley (25), Eun-sun (55 o.g.)	McDonald Jones Stadium	4,151
2019–20 A-League	52	24 July 2020	Central Coast	0–0	Newcastle			Central Coast Stadium	2,373
2020–21 A-League	53	31 December 2020	Central Coast	1–0	Newcastle	A. Kuol (43)		Central Coast Stadium	5,273
2020–21 A-League	54	15 May 2021	Newcastle	0–1	Central Coast	Simon (54 pen.)		McDonald Jones Stadium	5,080
2020–21 A-League	55	1 June 2021	Central Coast	0–2	Newcastle		O'Donovan (27), Mauragis (33)	Central Coast Stadium	4,973
2021–22 A-League Men	56	21 November 2021	Newcastle	1–2	Central Coast	Nisbet (50), Farrell (57)	Yuel (78)	McDonald Jones Stadium	6,424
2021–22 A-League Men	57	23 April 2022	Newcastle	2–4	Central Coast	Moresche (19), Cummings (30, 34 pen.), G. Kuol (90+1)	Mauragis (46), Farrell (50 o.g.)	McDonald Jones Stadium	6,202
2021–22 A-League Men	58	7 May 2022	Central Coast	2–0	Newcastle	Cummings (30), Nkololo (62)		Central Coast Stadium	11,703
2022–23 A-League Men	59	11 December 2022	Central Coast	1–2	Newcastle	Cummings (53)	Buhagiar (12), Mikeltadze (66)	Central Coast Stadium	7,078
2022–23 A-League Men	60	21 December 2022	Central Coast	3–0	Newcastle	Túlio (22), Cummings (63), Nkololo (87 pen.)		Central Coast Stadium	7,173
2022–23 A-League Men	61	22 April 2023	Newcastle	1–3	Central Coast	Silvera (28, 58), Túlio (69)	Sotirio (9)	McDonald Jones Stadium	9,271
2023–24 A-League Men	62	25 November 2023	Central Coast	3–1	Newcastle	Roux (45+2), Wilson (57), Reec (90+3)	Goodwin (76)	Central Coast Stadium	5,143
2023–24 A-League Men	63	2 March 2024	Newcastle	0–1	Central Coast	Nisbet (75)		McDonald Jones Stadium	7,117
2023–24 A-League Men	64	27 April 2024	Newcastle	1–3	Central Coast	A. Kuol (21), Steele (82), Edmondson (87)	Stamatelopoulos (47)	McDonald Jones Stadium	9,416
2024–25 A-League Men	65	22 November 2024	Newcastle	1–2	Central Coast	Kaltak (66), Šušnjar (75 o.g.)	Aquilina (64)	Sydney Football Stadium (Unite Round)	5,156
2024–25 A-League Men	66	1 February 2025	Central Coast	2–2	Newcastle	Paull (39), Faisal (50)	Rose (59), Natta (87)	Central Coast Stadium	9,145
2024–25 A-League Men	67	12 April 2025	Newcastle	6–0	Central Coast		Šušnjar (17), Sainsbury (45+1 o.g.), Wilmering (48), Taylor (50), Adams (73, 90+2)	McDonald Jones Stadium	6,822
2025–26 A-League Men	68	19 October 2025	Central Coast	3–2	Newcastle	McCalmont (28 pen.), Di Pizio (30), Duarte (90+8)	Badolato (14), Rose (80)	Central Coast Stadium	8,002
2025–26 A-League Men	69	28 February 2026	Central Coast	0–0	Newcastle			Central Coast Stadium	9,033
2025–26 A-League Men	70	25 April 2026	Newcastle	4–0	Central Coast		Dobson (21), Taylor (25), Adams (44), Mizunuma (86)	McDonald Jones Stadium	20,930
2026–27 A-League Men	71	17 October 2026	Central Coast	2–2	Newcastle	Auglah (11 pen.), Lavale (60 pen.)	Wood (49), Lavale (78 o.g.)	Central Coast Stadium	
2026–27 A-League Men	72	23 January 2027	Newcastle		Central Coast			McDonald Jones Stadium	
2026–27 A-League Men	73	25 April 2026	Newcastle		Central Coast			McDonald Jones Stadium	

=== Women's team ===
Competition	#	Date	Home team	Score	Away team	Goals (Mariners)	Goals (Jets)	Venue	Attendance^{a}
2008–09 W-League	1	29 November 2008	Central Coast	2–4	Newcastle	Rollason (65), Simon (90+1)	Jones (34),Van Egmond (44, 46), Peters (77)	Campbelltown Stadium	211
2009 W-League	2	24 October 2009	Newcastle	1–5	Central Coast	Vandenbergh (5), Heyman (21, 26), Fletcher (63 pen.), Camilleri (82)	Andrews (88)	Wanderers Oval	750
2009 W-League	3	27 November 2009	Central Coast	3–1	Newcastle	Heyman (36), Fletcher (71), Vandenbergh (74)	Andrews (44)	Central Coast Stadium	Unknown
2023–24 A-League Women	4	14 October 2023	Central Coast	0–1	Newcastle		Ayres (81)	Central Coast Stadium	5,735
2023–24 A-League Women	5	28 January 2024	Newcastle	0–2	Central Coast	Wurigumula (4), Hayward (72)		Newcastle Number 2 Sports Ground	3,023
2024–25 A-League Women	6	1 February 2025	Central Coast	5–1	Newcastle	Nunn (8), Galic (33), Fuller (49), Pennock (53), Trimis (90+3)	J. Allan (30)	Central Coast Stadium	3,742
2024–25 A-League Women	7	19 April 2025	Newcastle	1–2	Central Coast	Fuller (78), Pennock (83)	Jackson (57)	Maitland Regional Sportsground	1,479
2025–26 A-League Women	8	7 December 2025	Central Coast	4–1	Newcastle	Rasmussen (42, 71), Levin (78), Familton (83)	L. Allan (22)	Central Coast Stadium	328
2025–26 A-League Women	9	10 January 2026	Newcastle	1–2	Central Coast	Trimis (53), Rasmussen (70)	Brown (45+2)	Newcastle Number 2 Sports Ground	1,261

== Statistics ==
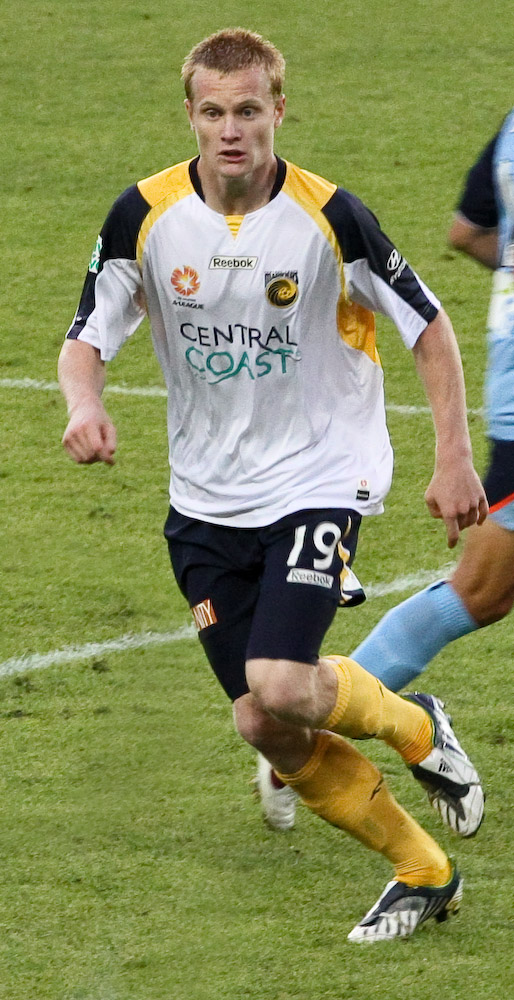
Matt Simon has scored a record nine goals in F3 derbies

=== Results ===
- Highest-scoring game:
  - 10 goals, Central Coast Mariners 2–8 Newcastle Jets (A-League, 14 April 2018)
- Largest winning margin:
  - 6 goals:
    - Central Coast Mariners 2–8 Newcastle Jets (A-League, 14 April 2018)
    - Newcastle Jets 6–0 Central Coast Mariners (A-League Men, 12 April 2025)

=== Trends ===
- Most consecutive wins: 6, Central Coast Mariners (21 December 2022 – 22 November 2024)
- Longest undefeated run: 9, Central Coast Mariners (8 December 2012 – 14 November 2015)
- Most consecutive draws: 3, (30 November 2014 – 14 November 2015)
- Most consecutive games without a draw: 13, (31 December 2020 – 22 November 2024)
- Most games played against each other in a season: 6 (twice), 2005–06, 2007–08
- Record highest attendance: 36,354. 24 February 2008, Sydney Football Stadium. Central Coast Mariners 0–1 Newcastle Jets
- Record lowest attendance: 2,373. 24 July 2020, Central Coast Stadium. Central Coast Mariners 0–0 Newcastle Jets (restricted number of spectators due to COVID-19 pandemic).
- Record appearance-maker: John Hutchinson (31), Central Coast Mariners. Played his first on 7 May 2005 and his thirty-first on 30 November 2014.
- Record goalscorer: Matt Simon (9), Central Coast Mariners. Scored his first on 15 August 2008 and his ninth on 15 May 2021.

== Crossing the divide ==
29 players have played for both Central Coast and Newcastle. The first player to play for both clubs was Noel Spencer, debuting for Newcastle in 2007 after making his Central Coast debut in 2005. Sam Silvera is the only player to have played for both clubs to have returned to his original club afterwards, returning to Central Coast in 2022 after his stint with Newcastle.

In the January transfer window of the 2022–23 season, the two clubs executed a swap deal, seeing James McGarry cross from the Jets to the Mariners and Thomas Aquilina go in the opposite direction from the Mariners to the Jets.

Statistics are sourced from ALeagueStats.com and updated as of 18 October 2026.

=== Central Coast, then Newcastle ===
Name	Pos	Central Coast			Newcastle		
Name	Pos	Career	Apps	Goals	Career	Apps	Goals
Noel Spencer	MF	2005–2007	55	7	2007–2008	30	1
James Holland	MF	2006	3	0	2007–2008	23	3
Sasho Petrovski	FW	2007–2009	51	16	2009–2011	42	11
Sam Gallagher	DF	2012	3	0	2014–2015	20	0
Marco Flores	FW	2013	12	3	2014	6	1
Nigel Boogaard	DF	2006–2010	66	3	2015–2021	127	5
Roy O'Donovan	FW	2015–2017	47	19	2017–2019, 2020–2021	74	31
Mitch Austin	FW	2015–2016	24	5	2018–2019	5	0
Jake Adelson	DF	2015	2	0	2019	1	0
Kwabena Appiah-Kubi	FW	2016–2018	40	4	2019	2	1
Nick Fitzgerald	FW	2010, 2013–2015	86	9	2019–2020	23	4
Matthew Millar	DF	2018–2019	24	1	2019–2021	45	4
Bernie Ibini-Isei	FW	2010–2014	96	21	2020	6	1
Samuel Silvera	FW	2019–2021, 2022–2023	55	10	2021–2022	21	1
Trent Buhagiar	FW	2016–2018	50	4	2022–2024	51	12
Thomas Aquilina	DF	2022–2023	13	0	2023–present	74	5
Charles M'Mombwa	FW	2018–2019	2	0	2025	2	0
Lucas Scicluna	MF	2025	5	0	2025–2026	12	0

=== Newcastle, then Central Coast ===
Name	Pos	Newcastle			Central Coast		
Name	Pos	Career	Apps	Goals	Career	Apps	Goals
Troy Hearfield	DF	2006–2008	20	0	2011–2012	36	2
Liam Reddy	GK	2005–2006	27	0	2013–2015	63	0
Ivan Necevski	GK	2006	3	0	2016–2017	8	0
Andrew Hoole	FW	2013–2015, 2016–2017	77	6	2017–2019	47	8
Ben Kennedy	GK	2006–2016	128	0	2017–2019	45	0
Matthew Nash	GK	2010–2012	13	0	2014–2015	2	0
Mario Shabow	FW	2017–2018	7	0	2018–2019	11	1
Mark Birighitti	GK	2012–2016	77	0	2019–2022	87	0
Jair	FW	2018–2019	20	2	2019–2020	15	1
James McGarry	DF	2022–2023	11	1	2023	14	3
Lucas Mauragis	DF	2020–2024	50	4	2024–present	56	3

=== Managers and coaches ===
No manager has managed both clubs, however, there have been some staff members to be involved with both clubs. Wayne O'Sullivan played for Central Coast from 2005 to 2007. In 2009, O'Sullivan became coach of Newcastle's women's team. In 2014, he returned to the Mariners as an assistant to head coach Phil Moss. Damien Brown played for Newcastle in the National Soccer League before playing for the Mariners and later moving into an off-field role. Jess Vanstrattan played for the Mariners before becoming goalkeeping coach at the Central Coast Mariners Academy, later joining the Jets in 2015 as a goalkeeping coach and occasional reserve goalkeeper.

== See also ==
- List of association football club rivalries by country
- Sports rivalry
- Nationalism and sport
