= Mexican Australians =

Australianos mexicanos (Spanish)
- (Mexico) (Australia)

Total population
- 10,754 (2021 census)

Regions with significant populations
- Sydney, Melbourne, Perth, Brisbane and Adelaide.

Languages
- Australian English, Mexican Spanish

Religion
- Mainly Roman Catholicism, minority of Protestantism and Irreligion.

Mexican Australians refers to Australian citizens of Mexican descent or Mexico-born person who reside in Australia. According to the 2016 Australian Census, 4,872 Mexican people resided in Australia. Mexicans are concentrated in New South Wales with a population of 1,703 followed by Victoria (1,478), Queensland (761), Western Australia (359), and South Australia (347). The first Mexican person recorded in Australia was a male living in Tasmania in 1881. 2,629 Mexican students reside in Australia.

== Notable Mexican Australians ==
- Maya Jupiter, rapper born in Mexico, raised in Australia.

== See also ==
- Hispanic and Latin American Australians
- Australia–Mexico relations
