= Isabel Gomez (soccer) =

Australian soccer player

Isabel Gómez
Personal information
- Date of birth: 6 July 2002 (age 24)
- Position: Midfielder

Team information
- Current team: Rosengård
- Number: 20

Senior career*
Years	Team	Apps	(Gls)
2020–2021	Western Sydney Wanderers	5	(0)
2021–2023	Wellington Phoenix	19	(0)
2022–2023	Northern Tigers	47	(3)
2023–2026	Central Coast Mariners	57	(12)
2026–	Rosengård	12	(0)

International career^{‡}
2024–	Australia U23	7	(0)
2025–	Australia	2	(0)
- * Club domestic league appearances and goals as of 7 November 2026 ‡ National team caps and goals as of 1 May 2026

Isabel Gómez (Spanish: [ˈɡomes] GOH-mez; born 6 July 2002) is an Australian professional soccer player who plays as an attacking midfielder for Damallsvenskan club FC Rosengård and the Australia national team.

Beginning her A-League Women's club career at Western Sydney Wanderers and playing for National Premier Leagues NSW Women's (NPL NSW Women's) club Northern Tigers in the off-season, Gómez moved to Wellington Phoenix after just one season. In 2023, she completed a move to Central Coast Mariners, where she was part of the team that won the grand final at the end of the 2024–25 season (the women's team's first ever trophy), before later winning the Julie Dolan Medal for the 2025–26 season. After receiving call-ups for the Australia national team and establishing herself as one of the best players in the A-League Women, she secured a move to Damallsvenskan club FC Rosengård in 2026.

== Early life ==
Isabel Gómez was born on 6 July 2002 in Sydney. She is of Mexican descent. As a junior she played for Mt Colah soccer club. By 2018 she was attending Westfields Sports High School, while playing at state level.

== Club career ==
=== State level ===
In 2016 Gómez joined Football NSW Institute, which competes in the National Premier Leagues NSW Women's (NPL NSW). After four years, she transferred to Northern Tigers FC in 2020, also in the NPL NSW. She played all 12 matches in the following year before the season was cancelled due to the COVID-19 restrictions. The Tigers won the Sapphire Cup in 2024 with a 2-1 victory over Sydney University SFC at Valentine Sports Park.

=== Western Sydney Wanderers ===
Gómez signed with A-League Women's team Western Sydney Wanderers (WSW) as a forward for their 2020–21 season and debuted on 30 December 2020. After five appearances she returned to the Tigers in the NPL NSW (see above) in March 2021, during the A-League off-season.

=== Wellington Phoenix ===
As a midfielder, Gómez was transferred to expansion team, Wellington Phoenix FC for the 2021–22 season. After 14 appearances she returned to the Tigers in the off-season. Her second season with Wellington (2022–23) was reduced to five appearances after a knee injury. Upon recovery, she resumed her duties with the Tigers under coach, Jake Stephenson.

=== Central Coast Mariners ===
In August 2023 under a free transfer, Gómez signed with Central Coast Mariners FC (CCM) for their 2023–24 season. Tigers' Stephenson is also CCM's assistant coach alongside Emily Husband as head coach. Gómez kicked her first A-League goal on 21 January 2024 in a 1–2 defeat by her former club, WSW. In the following season for CCM, she kicked five goals in 12 appearances to help her team to fourth position. In the ensuing finals series she kicked the winning goal in the second semi-final against premiers Melbourne City FC and the first goal in the grand final against Melbourne Victory FC. With CCM and Victory tied at 1–1 after extra time, the resultant penalty shoot-out had Gómez convert her spot kick and CCM were crowned Champions for their 5–4 win. As the 2025–26 A-League Women's best player, she was awarded the Julie Dolan Medal.

=== Rosengård ===
During the 2026 season, Gómez signed for Damallsvenskan club Rosengård, signing a contract until 2028.

== International career ==
Gómez was first called up for the Australia national team (Matildas) in 2024, when she was part of the extended 36-player squad for four friendlies: two against Brazil in Brisbane and the Gold Coast and two against Chinese Taipei in Melbourne and Geelong. She was called up alongside Central Coast Mariners teammate Jessika Nash. However, Gómez was unable to play due to an injury. Her international debut occurred on 2 June 2025 in a friendly against Argentina, when she was subbed on in the second half of a 4–1 victory for the Matildas in Canberra.

In August 2025 Gómez was selected for the Australia women's national under-23 soccer team (U23 Matildas), which competed in the 2025 ASEAN Women's Championship, held in Vietnam, against ASEAN Football Federation (AFF) full national teams. She competed in all five matches helping the U23 Matildas reach the final, which they won 1–0 against Myanmar.

== Personal life ==
Gómez is of Mexican descent. Although qualifying for either Australia's Matildas or the Mexican national team, as from April 2025, Gómez had not been approached by the latter federation.

== Honours ==
Central Coast Mariners

- A-League Women Championship: 2024–25

Australia U23

- ASEAN Women's Championship: 2025

Individual

- PFA A-League Women Team of the Season: 2024–25, 2025–26
- Julie Dolan Medal: 2025–26
