= Taren King =

Australian soccer player (born 1996)

Personal information
- Date of birth: 24 December 1996 (age 29)
- Place of birth: Shellharbour, New South Wales, Australia
- Position: Defender

Team information
- Current team: Central Coast Mariners
- Number: 18

Senior career*
Years	Team	Apps	(Gls)
2017–2020	Canberra United	22	(0)
2020–2023	Newcastle Jets	34	(1)
2023–	Central Coast Mariners	10	(1)
- * Club domestic league appearances and goals as of 18 March 2024

Taren King (born 24 December 1996) is an Australian soccer player who plays as a defender for the Central Coast Mariners. King is currently the captain of the champion winning team.

== Career ==
King began her professional career at A-League Women's side Canberra United FC, who signed the young defender ahead of the 2017–18 season. She quickly impressed manager Heather Garriock as she contested for the team's starting center-back position.

After making limited appearances for Canberra across three seasons, King joined the Newcastle Jets in 2020. In her first two seasons at the club, she established a strong partnership with Hannah Brewer at the heart of Newcastle's defense. In September 2022, King re-signed with the club.

In August 2023, Newcastle Jets announced that King departed the club to pursue another opportunity.

King signed for Newcastle’s F3 Derby rivals, the Central Coast Mariners, later that day. King was later announced as captain of the Mariners team, leading them in their first season back in the A-League Women competition. Unfortunately, midway through the season, King ruptured her ACL, ruling her out for the rest of the season.

== Personal life ==
King's younger brother Joel is also a professional footballer who represents the Australian national team.
