= Tiana Fuller =

Australian soccer player (born 2008)

Personal information
- Full name: Tiana Charlie Fuller
- Date of birth: 28 July 2008 (age 18)
- Place of birth: Australia
- Height: 1.69 m (5 ft 7 in)
- Position: Forward

Team information
- Current team: Central Coast Mariners
- Number: 12

Youth career
- 2018–2020: Marconi Stallions
- 2020–2023: Football NSW Institute

Senior career*
Years	Team	Apps	(Gls)
2024	Football NSW Institute	25	(5)
2024–	Central Coast Mariners	34	(6)
2025	Sydney Olympic	8	(6)
2026 -	NWS Spirit FC	1	(1)

International career^{‡}
2023–2024	Australia U17	6	(4)
2025–	Australia U20	8	(2)
- * Club domestic league appearances and goals as of 18 May 2026 ‡ National team caps and goals as of 24 May 2026

Tiana Charlie Fuller (born 28 July 2008) is an Australian professional soccer player who plays as a forward for A-League Women club Central Coast Mariners.

== Club career ==
=== National Premier League Women's (NPLW) ===
Fuller began playing senior level club football in the New South Wales National Premier League Women's competition during the 2024 season, making 25 appearances for Football NSW Institute.

In June 2025, Fuller was a mid-season signing with New South Wales club, Sydney Olympic FC for the second half of the 2025 season.

In May 2026, Fuller linked up with New South Wales National Premier League Club, NWS Spirit FC for the second half of the 2026 season.

=== A-League Women ===
Fuller signed her first professional contract with A-League Women team Central Coast Mariners in September 2024.

On 30 November 2024, at the age of 16 years and 125 days, Fuller became the youngest debutant and goal scorer for the Central Coast Mariners when she made her league debut after entering as a substitute in the Round 5 match against Canberra United at Industree Group Stadium. Fuller scored her debut goal in the 63rd minute, just four minutes after taking the field. The Central Coast Mariners went on to win the match 2–1.

Fuller made her starting line-up debut for Central Coast Mariners on 26 January 2025 against Wellington Phoenix in which she was the only scorer of the match after hitting the back of the net in the 54th minute.

Fuller took part in Central Coast Mariners penalty shoot-out win over Melbourne Victory in the 2024/25 A-League Women's Grand Final after entering the match as a substitute in the 86th minute. Fuller took the first of the Central Coast Mariners five successful penalty shots securing the Championship.

== International career ==
=== Junior Matildas ===
Fuller was called up to the Australian under-17 team (Junior Matildas) in the lead up to 2024 AFC U-17 Asian Cup qualification. Fuller toured with the Australian team to their Round 1 qualifier matches hosted by the Mongolian Football Federation in Ulaanbaatar on 24–28 April 2023. Fuller made her debut in the opening match against the hosts Mongolia, scoring four goals in the 11–0 win.

Fuller was a member of the 23-player Australian squad selected to travel to Bali, Indonesia to contest the 2024 AFC U-17 Women's Asian Cup. Fuller was in the starting line-up for games against China, Japan, and Thailand.

=== Young Matildas ===
Fuller was named in a 26-player squad to represent the Australian under-20 team (Young Matildas) in the PacificAus Sports Four Nations Tournament to be held in Canberra, Australia between 19 and 26 February 2025 however did not take part in the matches due to injury.

Fuller was named in the squad for the 2026 AFC U-20 Women's Asian Cup (Thailand) Qualification matches hosted by the Tajikistan Football Federation in Dushanbe between 6-10 of August 2025. Fuller was in the starting line-up for their opening match against the hosts Tajikistan, scoring a 48th minute goal in the 14–0 win.

Fuller was selected to participate in a two-game international friendly series against South Korea held at the Australian Institute of Sport (AIS) in Canberra.

Fuller was selected by head coach Alex Epakis as part of Australia's 23-player squad for the 2026 AFC U-20 Women's Asian Cup in Thailand. Fuller was in the starting line-up in their opening fixture against Chinese Taipei and appeared as a substitute against India and DPR Korea.

Fuller was selected and participated in a two game friendly series against New Zealand held at the Australian Institute of Sport (AIS) in Canberra
