= Shadeene Evans =

Australian soccer player

Shay Evans
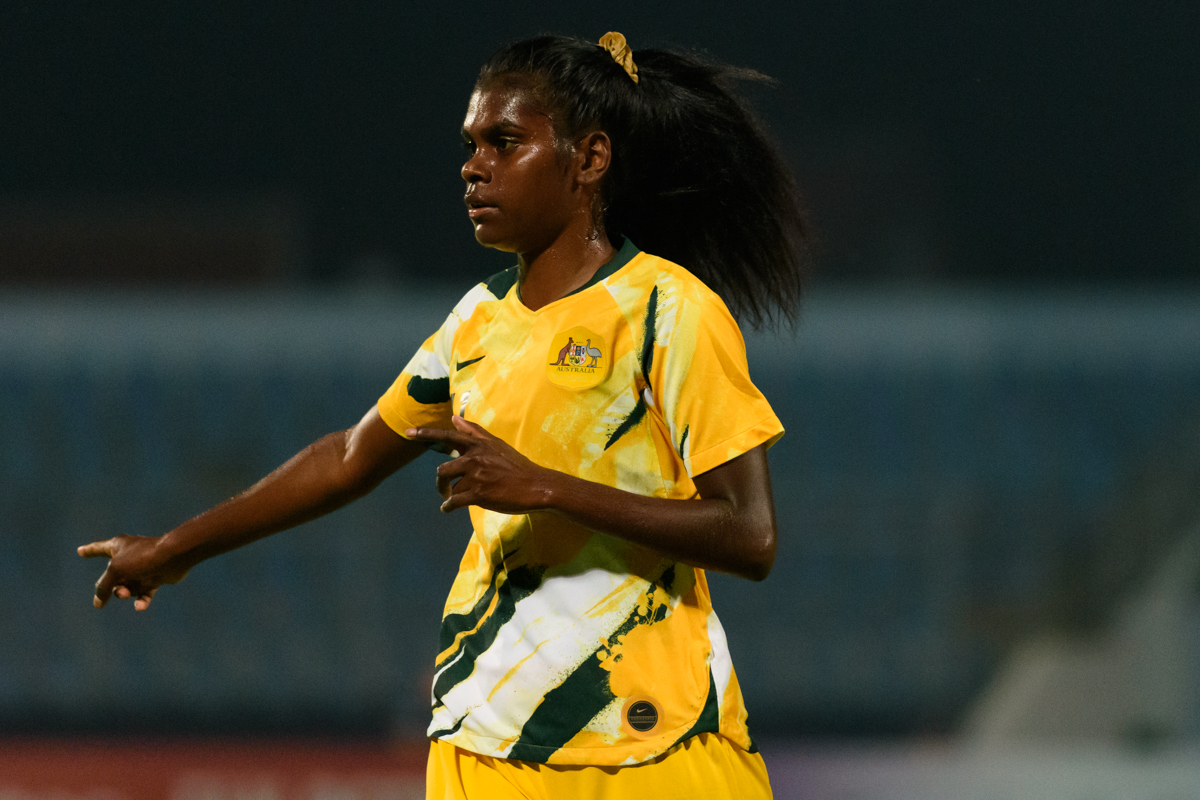

Personal information
- Full name: Shadeene Evans
- Date of birth: 7 September 2001 (age 25)
- Place of birth: Borroloola, Australia
- Position: Forward

Team information
- Current team: Central Coast Mariners
- Number: 24

Senior career*
Years	Team	Apps	(Gls)
2018–2020	Sydney FC	5	(1)
2020	Sydney Olympic	5	(1)
2021	Northern Tigers	12	(5)
2021–2022	Adelaide United	7	(0)
2022–2023	Sydney FC	1	(0)
2023	Northern Tigers	13	(1)
2023–	Central Coast Mariners	21	(1)

International career^{‡}
2019	Australia U-17		
2019–	Australia U-20	2	(1)
- * Club domestic league appearances and goals as of 8 January 2025 ‡ National team caps and goals as of 1 May 2019

Shadeene "Shay" Evans (born 7 September 2001) is an Australian soccer player who currently plays as a forward for Central Coast Mariners.

== Early life ==
Born and raised in Borroloola, Northern Territory, Australia, Evans was introduced to soccer at age nine, by the JMF program run by John Kundereri Moriarty the first Indigenous footballer to be selected for Australia. Her first coach was inaugural JMF pilot program football coach Daniel Campos, a former goalkeeper from Sydney commencing in her native Borroloola in April 2012. Her early learning and training in the game with the after-schools boys/girls program under various JMF program coaches led to Shadeene requiring further development. Selected in 2014 thanks to her stand out talent and good school behaviour, Moriarty offered her the inaugural JMF school sports scholarship. Evans not only proved to be an appropriate candidate, raring to go as the first scholarship recipient moving to Sydney. Prior to her life-changing relocation, Shay flew to Brazil in the Socceroos' charter flight along with seven other Indigenous boys and girls from Borroloola and the Roper Gulf community to experience the 2014 FIFA World Cup.

In August 2015, Evans moved to New South Wales where she attended Westfields Sports High School located 3,000 kilometers from Borroloola. "I miss family, going out bush and hunting and camping. It's bush, scrub and rivers, and we sleep outside with tents and a fire. It's really small, a really remote community, and there's not many people. But there's a lot of soccer," she says. She was coached by Alen Stajcic, the head coach of the Australia women's national soccer team. In addition to her life-changing experience, with a care family, studying, training at school and a entirely new social circle, she was selected part of the NSW Institute of Sport.

== Club career ==
In November 2018, Evans signed with Sydney FC ahead of the 2018-19 W-League season. She made her debut for the club during a 3–0 win against the Western Sydney Wanderers on 10 January 2019.

On 17 November 2019, Evans scored her first senior goal for Sydney FC in a 3–0 win over Melbourne Victory in Round 1 of the 2019–20 W-League season.

After the W-League season, Evans returned to the NPL, and played 5 matches for Sydney Olympic. The next season she joined Northern Tigers.

Ahead of the 2021–22 A-League Women season, Evans returned to the top Australian league, joining Adelaide United. In October 2022, she returned to Sydney FC. In September 2023, Evans joined Central Coast Mariners.

== International career ==
In March 2018, Evans was named to the Young Matildas along with ten other footballers from the NSW Institute of Sport, for a week-long training camp preceding a match against Thailand.
