= Rola Badawiya =

American soccer player (born 1998)

Personal information
- Date of birth: 27 June 1998 (age 28)
- Place of birth: Riverside, California, US
- Position: Forward

Team information
- Current team: Perth Glory
- Number: 17

College career
Years	Team	Apps	(Gls)
2017–2018	Long Beach State Beach	39	(5)
2019–2020	California Baptist Lancers	34	(18)

Senior career*
Years	Team	Apps	(Gls)
2021–2022	AS Roma		
2022	Sydney Uni SFC	22	(13)
2023	Sydney FC	9	(1)
2023	North West Sydney Spirit FC	17	(5)
2023–2024	Central Coast Mariners FC	24	(8)
2024–2025	SC Braga	16	(2)
2025–	Perth Glory	21	(7)
- * Club domestic league appearances and goals

Rola Badawiya (Arabic: رولا بدوية, pronounced [ruːla baduːwija]; born 27 June 1998) is an American professional soccer player who plays as a forward for Perth Glory in the A-League Women.

== Early life ==
Badawiya was born on 27 June 1998 in Riverside, California. Born to Palestinian parents, she is the daughter of Yousef Badawiya, who was born in the Gaza Strip. Growing up, she attended Martin Luther King High School in the United States, where she played on the soccer team, helping them reach the quarter-finals of the 2016 CIF Southern Section Division II.

== Career ==
Badawiya started her career with Italian side AS Roma in 2021. In 2022, she signed for Australian side Sydney Uni SFC, where she made twenty-two league appearances and scored thirteen goals. Australian news website Beyond 90 wrote in 2023 that she was "well-known to followers of the NPL NSW competition, helping Sydney University win the 2022 Premiership in her first campaign with The Students. Along the way, she scored 13 goals and was named NPL NSW Player of the Year" while playing for the club.

Subsequently, she signed for Australian side Sydney FC, where she made nine league appearances and scored one goal. The same year, she signed for Australian side North West Sydney Spirit FC, where she made seventeen league appearances and scored five goals. Ahead of the 2023–24 season, she signed for Australian side Central Coast Mariners FC, where she made twenty-four league appearances and scored eight goals. During the summer of 2024, she signed for Portuguese side SC Braga.

In August 2025, Badawiya returned to Australia, signing a two-year contract with Perth Glory.
