= Jade Pennock =

English footballer (born 1993)

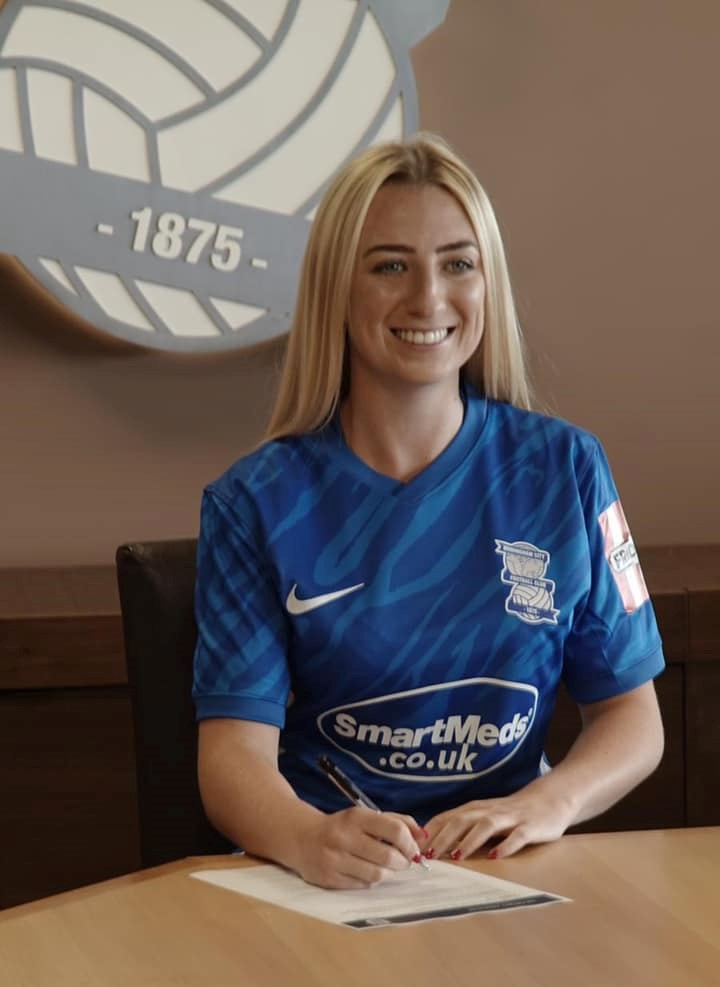
- Pennock signing a professional contract for Birmingham City in July 2021

Personal information
- Date of birth: 8 January 1993 (age 33)
- Place of birth: Pontefract, England
- Height: 1.65 m (5 ft 5 in)
- Positions: Winger; attacking midfielder

Youth career
- 2001–2009: Leeds

College career
Years	Team	Apps	(Gls)
2011–2014	Montevallo Falcons	40	(16)
2015	North Georgia Nighthawks	21	(9)

Senior career*
Years	Team	Apps	(Gls)
2009–2010	Leeds		
2017	Harrogate Town		
2017–2018	Doncaster Belles	4	(1)
2018–2021	Sheffield United	50	(23)
2021–2025	Birmingham City	69	(17)
2024–2025	→ Central Coast Mariners (loan)	25	(7)
2025–2026	Sporting JAX	25	(3)
2026–	Durham	0	(0)
- * Club domestic league appearances and goals as of 6 July 2026

Jade Pennock (born 8 January 1993) is an English professional footballer who plays as a winger or attacking midfielder for Durham. She is the leading goalscorer and highest assist creator in Sheffield United's Championship history. Pennock has also previously played for Leeds and Doncaster Belles, as well as Sporting JAX of the USL Super League.

== College career ==
Pennock began her youth career at Leeds in 2001; she won the County Cup in 2009 and was nominated Managers Player of the Year. She then moved to the United States to play college soccer and was named as freshman of the year whilst at the University of Montevallo.

After spending the majority of her collegiate career with the Montevallo Falcons, Pennock transferred to the University of North Georgia for her senior year in 2015, where she earned multiple honors and set several program records. Pennock was selected for the PBC All-Tournament All-Stars team, and received All-American honours from the NSCAA. She was also named captain whilst playing for the UNG and was only the fourth ever player in the university's history to be named on the All-American honours team in 2015.

== Club career ==
=== Doncaster Belles ===
In summer 2017, Pennock moved to Doncaster Belles from Harrogate Town where she then won the WSL2 championship. Pennock scored the goal that secured the title for Doncaster Belles in a 1–0 victory over Millwall with one game left in the league.

=== Sheffield United ===
Pennock signed for Sheffield United on 26 July 2018. In 2019, Pennock was announced as Sheffield United's Player of the Year, Player's Player of the Year and Manager's Player of the year. After scoring a hat-trick against Crystal Palace and then a follow-up goal in a cameo against Charlton in 2019, The Telegraph & Yahoo Sports reported that Pennock had a goal scoring ratio of one goal to every 62.1 minutes that season, having scored 14 goals in her last 13 appearances. In October 2019, she combined her football career with a job working as a coach at the YMCA, meaning she only attended 2 out of the 3 nightly training sessions run by the club each week.

After Sheffield United joined the second tier of English women's football, Pennock became their top goal-scorer and assist maker of that era. In 2019, Pennock scored a 94th minute winning goal against Women's Super League team Liverpool in what was labelled a "shock" 3–2 victory for Sheffield in the Continental Cup.

Pennock signed a one-year contract extension with Sheffield United ahead of the 2020–21 FA Women's Championship season. She later scored the first ever goal of Neil Redfern’s tenure as Sheffield United manager in 2020 as she scored twice against Championship opponents London City Lionesses. On 24 May 2021, Pennock confirmed she would be leaving Sheffield United after three seasons.

=== Birmingham City ===
On 17 July 2021, Pennock signed for Birmingham City in the Women's Super League, making her the first signing under new manager Scott Booth. Pennock scored her first goal for Birmingham in her third appearance for the team, during a WSL fixture against Everton. On 1 January 2022, Pennock played the whole 90 minutes of Birmingham's 2–0 win over then, Women's Super League leaders Arsenal. The victory was branded as the biggest WSL upset in its history and Pennock was subsequently selected for the Her Football Hub WSL team of the week.

Pennock's goal for Birmingham against Reading in the FA Women's Super League was nominated for the WSL goal of the month and saw her performance noted in the team of the week, chosen by Siobhan Chamberlain. At the end of the 2022–23 season, Pennock scored 14 goals in all competitions, 11 of those in the FA Women's Championship to finish as Birmingham City's top scorer. She was voted as both the Player of the Season and Players’ Player of the Season. On 30 May, Pennock was named Women's Championship Player of the Season.

On 30 June 2023, It was announced that Pennock had signed a new two-year contract at Birmingham. She was the third player to be announced as confirmed contract extensions ahead of the 2023/24 Barclays Women's Championship season behind Siobhan Wilson and Martha Harris.

In September 2024, Pennock was loaned to Australian club Central Coast Mariners for the 2024–25 A-League Women season.

=== Sporting JAX ===
On 1 July 2025, USL Super League club, Sporting JAX, announced they had signed Pennock to their squad. Stacey Balaam, head coach of Sporting JAX, had previously coached Pennock at the University of North Georgia. Pennock scored the first goal in club history, netting in the club's season-opening loss to DC Power FC on 23 August 2025. She went on to total 3 goals and 1 assist in her sole season in Jacksonville.

=== Durham ===
On 6 July 2026, it was announced that Pennock had returned to the Women's Super League 2 and joined Durham.

== Personal life ==
In early 2021, Pennock starred in the television women's football documentary mini-series Throw in the Kitchen Sink talking about the challenges of players balancing semi-professional football with stable careers.

== Career statistics ==
=== Club ===
As of 11 June 2026

Club	Season	League			Cup		Playoffs		Total	
Club	Season	Division	Apps	Goals	Apps	Goals	Apps	Goals	Apps	Goals
Sheffield United	2018–21	FA Women's Championship	62	34	13	6	0	0	75	40
Birmingham City	2021–22	Women's Super League	19	2	4	0	0	0	23	2
Birmingham City	2022–25	Women's Championship	55	15	8	2	3	1	69	18
Central Coast Mariners (loan)	2024–25	A-League Women	27	7	3	0	0	0	30	7
Sporting JAX	2025–26	USL Super League	25	3	0	0	1	0	26	3
Career total			188	61	28	8	4	1	223	70

== Honours ==
Doncaster Belles

- Women's Super League 2: 2017–18

Individual

- All-American All Star Team NSCAA: 2015
- FA Women's Championship Player of the Season: 2022–23
- FA Women's Championship Player of the Month: October 2019 February 2023
- FA Women's Championship Goal of the Month: February 2023
- Sheffield United Player of the Year: 2019
- Birmingham City Player of the Season: 2022–23
- Birmingham City Players’ Player of the Season: 2022–23
