= Jazmin Wardlow =

American soccer player (born 1997)

Personal information
- Full name: Jazmin Nichole Wardlow
- Birth name: Jazmin Nichole Jackmon
- Date of birth: October 30, 1997 (age 29)
- Place of birth: Pasadena, California, U.S.
- Height: 5 ft 10 in (1.78 m)
- Position: Defender

Team information
- Current team: Canberra United
- Number: 5

College career
Years	Team	Apps	(Gls)
2015–2016	Santa Clara	39	(0)
2017–2018	Oregon	38	(1)

Senior career*
Years	Team	Apps	(Gls)
2019	Houston Dash	0	(0)
2021	Spartak Subotica	2	(0)
2022–2023	Fiorentina	21	(1)
2023–2024	Central Coast Mariners	25	(0)
2024–2025	Galatasaray	6	(0)
2025–	Canberra United	0	(0)
- * Club domestic league appearances and goals as of 27 May 2024

Jazmin Nichole Wardlow (née Jackmon; born October 30, 1997) is an American soccer player who plays as a defender for Canberra United.

== Early life ==
Wardlow was raised in Pasadena, California, and attended South Pasadena High School, where she competed in track and field and soccer.

== Collegiate career ==
Wardlow attended Santa Clara University in 2015 and 2016, playing for the Santa Clara Broncos women's soccer team, which reached the quarterfinals of the 2016 NCAA Division I women's soccer tournament.

Wardlow then attended the University of Oregon and played on the Oregon Ducks women's soccer team in 2017 and 2018, appearing in 38 matches and starting 36. She played primarily at left outside defensive back, and also as a center back. She scored her first collegiate goal on October 18, 2018, against UCLA.

== Club career ==
Wardlow considered her decision to register for the National Women's Soccer League (NWSL) 2019 College Draft to be "nervewracking" due to the risk of potentially going undrafted. Houston Dash selected her 21st overall in the draft, making Wardlow the first Oregon Ducks player ever drafted into the NWSL.

=== Houston Dash (2019) ===
Wardlow made her first professional appearance in October 2019, as a substitute in a club friendly match between the Dash and Tigres UANL played in Estadio Universitario. However, she did not make a regular-season appearance for the club, and the Dash waived her after the season on January 22, 2020.

=== ŽFK Spartak Subotica (2021) ===
Wardlow joined Serbian SuperLiga champions ŽFK Spartak Subotica in 2021, where she made her first competitive appearances as a professional footballer in the 2021–22 UEFA Women's Champions League. Wardlow was one of three new transfers to the club for the campaign. Wardlow started in the 5–2 victory against Peamount United in the Champions Path tournament 9 qualifying semi-finals and played in the finals loss against FC Twente, in which Spartak held a 3–0 lead in the 73rd minute but lost 3–5.

She did not play for Spartak after November 2021, after filing a claim to FIFA.

=== ACF Fiorentina (2022–2023) ===
On August 2, 2022, Wardlow joined Serie A club ACF Fiorentina.

Wardlow signed a contract through the end of the Serie A season upon joining Fiorentina. She scored her first professional goal, a header from a free kick, against F.C. Como on September 11, 2022, in a 2–1 victory.

=== Central Coast Mariners (2023–2024) ===
In August 2023, Wardlow joined Australian club Central Coast Mariners. In July 2024, the club announced that Wardlow departed the club.

=== Galatasaray (2024–2025) ===
On 23 August 2024, Wardlow signed a one-year contract with Turkish Super League club Galatasaray.

=== Canberra United (2025–) ===
In September 2025, Wardlow returned to Australia, joining Canberra United for the 2025–26 A-League Women season.

== Personal life ==
Wardlow's father Marvin played gridiron football as a linebacker for Northern Arizona, and was rostered with the National Football League's San Francisco 49ers in 1985. Her brother Jordan Jackmon also played collegiate soccer, for Cal Poly Pomona. She is the granddaughter of artist Marvin X.

She married Evan Wardlow in June 2023.
