= Annalise Rasmussen =

Australian soccer player (born 2005)

Personal information
- Date of birth: 23 May 2005 (age 21)
- Place of birth: Sydney, New South Wales, Australia
- Position: Centre forward

Team information
- Current team: Toulouse (on loan from Juventus)
- Number: 9

Youth career
- 2016–2023: Central Coast Mariners

Senior career*
Years	Team	Apps	(Gls)
2023–2026	Central Coast Mariners	62	(20)
2026–	Juventus	1	(1)
2026–	→ Toulouse (loan)	3	(1)

International career^{‡}
2025–	Australia U23	2	(0)
- * Club domestic league appearances and goals as of 20 September 2026 ‡ National team caps and goals as of 19 August 2025

Annalise Rasmussen (Afrikaans: [ˈras.mʏ.sən] RAS-muus-ən; born 23 May 2005) is an Australian soccer player who plays as a forward for Première Ligue club Toulouse, on loan from Serie A Femminile club Juventus and the Australia under-23 national team. She previously played for A-League Women club Central Coast Mariners.

== Early life ==
Rasmussen was born on 23 May 2005 in Gosford, New South Wales, to a Cook Islander father and a South African mother. She graduated from Central Coast Mariners Academy in 2022, which she first joined at 11 years old. With the team, she competed in the National Premier Leagues NSW Women's (NPL NSW Women's) for seven years. Growing up, she dreamed of representing Australia at an international level.

== Club career ==
=== Central Coast Mariners ===
A Central Coast Mariners Academy graduate, Rasmussen was promoted to Central Coast Mariners (CCM) senior team in October 2022 ahead of the 2023–24 season, in which the club would return to the A-League Women after a 14-year hiatus. She was the club's first signing when the team re-entered the competition.

Rasmussen made her debut for CCM on 14 October 2023 (aged 18) in the opening round, starting in a 1–0 home defeat to rivals Newcastle Jets in the F3 Derby in front of 5,735 fans at Central Coast Stadium. In August 2024, Rasmussen signed a two-year contract extension until 2026.

Rasmussen kicked CCM's 100th goal in the A-League for their 2–1 victory against Brisbane Roar in March 2025. She was a member of the CCM team that won the 2025 A-League Women grand final on 18 May at Melbourne Rectangular Stadium, where they defeated Melbourne Victory 5–4 on penalties after a 1–1 draw after extra time. The win was regarded as one of the greatest upsets in the competition's history, and was the first A-League Women grand final to be determined by a penalty shootout.

In February 2026, Rasmussen departed the club to join Serie A Femminile side Juventus on a club record fee.

=== Juventus ===
Rasmussen moved to Italy and joined Serie A Femminile club Juventus in February 2026, during the 2025–26 season. She became the first Australian to ever sign for the club. Due to being stranded in Doha, Qatar (a stopover on her connecting flight) due to the 2026 Iran War, Rasmussen's arrival in Turin was delayed until March. She made her début for the club on 17 May 2026 (the final day of the Serie A season), starting her first match and scoring her first goal in a 3–1 win over Parma at the Stadio Il Noce in Noceto.

=== Toulouse ===
Seeking more game time, Rasmussen moved to France and went on loan to Première Ligue club Toulouse for the 2026–27 season, becoming the club's ninth new signing of the season. She made her competitive début for the club in the first match of the season on 5 September 2026, coming on as a substitute in a 5–1 away defeat to Montpellier at the Stade Mama Ouattara in Montpellier. She made her starting début in the second match of the season on 12 September 2026, playing the entirety of a 2–1 home defeat to Le Havre at the Stadium de Toulouse in Toulouse. In the third match of the season on 19 September 2026, she scored her first goal for the club, scoring the opening goal in a 2–2 draw away with Lens at the Stade François Blin in Avion.

== International career ==
Rasmussen received her first international call-up in August 2025 when she was selected by Joe Palatsides as part of Australia's 22-player squad that won the 2025 ASEAN Women's Championship in Vietnam. The squad consisted entirely of under-23 players playing in the A-League Women, and competed against senior national teams from the ASEAN Football Federation (AFF).

Rasmussen made her debut on 7 August, when she started in the opening group stage match against Myanmar, which the U23 Matildas lost 2–1. On 10 August, she again started in a 1–0 win over the Philippines on the second day of the group stage. However, she was then benched in Australia's 9–0 win over East Timor on the final day of the group stage (the team's biggest ever win), then again in the U23 Matildas' 2–1 semi-final win over hosts Vietnam, and once again in the final, in which Australia was victorious, winning 1–0 over Myanmar to claim the under-23's first ever ASEAN Women's Championship title.
