= Urgamal =

Chinese footballer

Personal information
- Date of birth: 26 August 1996 (age 30)
- Place of birth: Bairin Right Banner, Inner Mongolia, China
- Height: 1.70 m (5 ft 7 in)
- Position: Forward

Team information
- Current team: Montpellier Hérault Sport Club Féminines

Senior career*
Years	Team	Apps	(Gls)
2015–2017	Tianjin Huisen		
2018–	Changchun Dazhong		
2023–2024	→ Central Coast Mariners (loan)	25	(8)

International career^{‡}
2021–	China	9	(4)
- * Club domestic league appearances and goals as of 27 May 2024 ‡ National team caps and goals as of 29 October 2023

Urgamal (Mongolian Cyrillic: Ургaмал, Chinese: 乌日古木拉; pinyin: Wūrìgǔmùlā) is a Chinese professional footballer who plays as a forward for Première Ligue club Montpellier Hérault Sport Club Féminines and the China national team. She studied in the Inner Mongolia Normal University.

== Club career ==
In September 2023, Wurigumula joined Australian club Central Coast Mariners.

== Career statistics ==
=== Club ===
As of match played 20 October 2023

Appearances and goals by club, season and competition
Club	Season	League			National cup		Total	
Club	Season	Division	Apps	Goals	Apps	Goals	Apps	Goals
Central Coast Mariners	2023–24	A-League	2	1	—		2	1
Career total			2	1	—		2	1

=== International ===
As of match played 29 October 2023

Appearances and goals by national team and year
National team	Year	Apps	Goals
China	2021	2	0
China	2023	7	4
Total		9	4

Scores and results list China's goal tally first, score column indicates score after each Wurigumula goal.

List of international goals scored by Wurigumula
No.	Date	Venue	Opponent	Score	Result	Competition
1	22 September 2023	Linping Sports Center Stadium, Hangzhou, China	Mongolia	10–0	16–0	2022 Asian Games
2	22 September 2023	Linping Sports Center Stadium, Hangzhou, China	Mongolia	15–0	16–0	2022 Asian Games
3	6 October 2023	Huanglong Stadium. Hangzhou, China	Uzbekistan	4–0	7–0	2022 Asian Games
4	29 October 2023	Xiamen Egret Stadium, Xiamen, China	Thailand	3–0	3–0	2024 AFC Women's Olympic Qualifying Tournament
