= Bianca Gittany =

Croatian footballer (born 1999)

Personal information
- Full name: Bianca Rose Gittany
- Birth name: Bianca Rose Galić
- Date of birth: 14 May 1999 (age 27)
- Place of birth: Australia
- Height: 1.77 m (5 ft 10 in)
- Position: Midfielder

Team information
- Current team: Sydney FC
- Number: 8

Senior career*
Years	Team	Apps	(Gls)
- Sydney University
2020–2021	Canberra United	11	(1)
2021–2022	Western Sydney Wanderers	10	(0)
2022–2023	Sydney University	13	(1)
2023–2025	Central Coast Mariners	42	(4)
2025–	Sydney FC	14	(1)

International career^{‡}
2024–	Croatia	10	(0)
- * Club domestic league appearances and goals as of 21 March 2026 ‡ National team caps and goals as of 3 July 2026

Bianca Rose Gittany (née Galić; /ˈɡɑːlɪtʃ/ GAH-litch, Croatian: [ɡǎːlitɕ]; born 14 May 1999) is a footballer who plays as a midfielder for A-League Women club Sydney FC. Born in Australia, she plays for the Croatia national team.

== Early life ==
Gittany was born on 14 May 1999 in Australia and is of Croatian descent through her grandparents. The cousin of Australian soccer player Ivana Galic, she grew up in Sydney, Australia. Since childhood, she has been a fan of Premier League club Liverpool.

== Club career ==
Gittany started her career with Australian side Sydney University, helping the club win the league title. In 2020, she signed for Australian side Canberra United. One year later, she signed for Australian side Western Sydney Wanderers, before returning to Australian side Sydney University in 2022. Subsequently, she signed for Australian side Central Coast Mariners in 2023. She departed the club in July 2025 and signed a three-year contract with Sydney FC.

== Personal life ==
Having known her partner Thomas since 2018, the couple got engaged in 2024. Away from soccer, she works as a physiotherapist. In March 2026, they got married and Bianca took on the surname Gittany.
