= Indian cricket team in Australia in 1999–2000 =

1999–2000 Border–Gavaskar Trophy
- Date: 26 November 1999 – 30 January 2000
- Location: Australia
- Result: Australia won the 3-match series 3–0
- Player of the series: (India) Sachin Tendulkar
Teams
- Australia: India
Captains
- Steve Waugh: Sachin Tendulkar
Most runs
- Ricky Ponting (375): Sachin Tendulkar (278)
Most wickets
- Glenn McGrath (18): Ajit Agarkar (11)

The Indian national cricket team toured Australia in the 1999–2000 season. They played 3 Test matches losing all the three of them. They played 8 One Day Internationals as part of the Carlton & United Series against Pakistan and Australia.

Pakistan and Australia reached the 2 game final which was won by Australia.

== Background ==
The 76-day itinerary for the tour included three Tests, an ODI triangular series, and three other first-class and List A fixtures. The first match was a first-class match against Queensland to begin on 26 November 1999.

The Indian team left for Australia on 22 November 1999 from Mumbai. Arriving in Australia, India had a record of 3 wins and 16 losses in the 25 Tests played in the country over 50 years and six tours. The last tour of 1991–92, that included a five-match Test series, had ended in a 4–0 loss. India's captain Sachin Tendulkar expected his team to "do well" in the tour ahead of arrival. But Mohammad Azharuddin match fixing allegations & calls for his subsequent life ban from International Cricket rocked India in 1999. Going into the Test series with former stats, won only one away Test since 1986 & the Azhar scandal, India was indeed in a spot of boiler. Mohammad Azharuddin was not included in the squad which weakened Indian batting unit heavily. In preparation for the tour, India rested Anil Kumble, Javagal Srinath, and Venkatesh Prasad, three of its frontline bowlers, for the last two ODIs against New Zealand, of the home series prior to the tour, before Srinath was called up to replace an injured Ajay Jadeja in the final game. Dr Bhargava of the Madhya Pradesh Cricket Association was appointed the team's manager for the tour.

Australia entered the series on the back of a 3–0 series win at home against Pakistan. They were also expected to beat India 3–0 while some predicted a 2–0 result in their favour. The former got consolidated after India's loss in the first-class tour game against Queensland. Beginning the tour, India were placed fifth in the ICC Test rankings.

== Squads ==
Squads
India	Australia
Sachin Tendulkar (c); Sourav Ganguly (vc); Ajit Agarkar; ~~Mohammad Azharuddin~~; Vijay Bharadwaj; Rahul Dravid; Devang Gandhi; ~~Ajay Jadeja~~; Hrishikesh Kanitkar; Thirunavukkarasu Kumaran; Anil Kumble; VVS Laxman; Debashish Mohanty; MSK Prasad (wk); Venkatesh Prasad; Sadagoppan Ramesh; Harbhajan Singh; Javagal Srinath	Steve Waugh (c); Shane Warne (vc); Greg Blewett; Damien Fleming; Adam Gilchrist (wk); Michael Kasprowicz; Justin Langer; Brett Lee; Glenn McGrath; Colin Miller; Ricky Ponting; Michael Slater; Mark Waugh

The BCCI announced a 16-man India squad for the tour on 1 November. Sunil Joshi was the only regular member of the team left out. The Indian selectors received criticism for the exclusion of Mohammad Azharuddin and the inclusion of Ajay Jadeja and Ajit Agarkar from the squad that was justified by Chandu Borde, the chairman of selectors, citing Match fixing allegations on Azharuddin & emphasizing on the fact of having chosen a squad of "young blood" and with "focus ... on youth." Later, Jadeja, who had torn a rotator cuff of his right shoulder on 10 November, a day prior to an ODI against New Zealand, was ruled out and Hrishikesh Kanitkar was named as his replacement, who was picked over Nayan Mongia and Jacob Martin. The Australia squad for the first Test was announced on 6 December. For the second Test, Colin Miller was replaced by Brett Lee.

== Tour matches ==
=== Four-day: Queensland v Indians ===
26–29 November 1999
Scorecard

Indians	v	Queensland
277 (91.3 overs); VVS Laxman 113 (209); Scott Muller 3/27 (20 overs)		401 (101.4 overs); Andrew Symonds 161 (174); Thirunavukkarasu Kumaran 5/68 (25 overs)
204 (70.3 overs); VVS Laxman 73 (101); Matthew Anderson 4/50 (23.3 overs)		82/0 (20.5 overs); Stuart Law 60* (65); Anil Kumble 0/10 (3 overs)

Queensland won by 10 wickets
The Gabba, Brisbane
Umpires: Peter Parker and Glen Zimmer

- Queensland won the toss and elected to field.
- Martin Love (Queensland) passed 5,000 runs in first-class cricket.

The Indians lost their first wicket in Devang Gandhi for no score after having been put in to bat by Queensland captain Stuart Law after winning the toss. Sadagoppan Ramesh followed Gandhi after a 100-run stand for the second wicket with VVS Laxman, with the latter then putting on 136 runs with captain Sachin Tendulkar (83) for the fourth wicket. Laxman brought up his century in 200 balls, striking three consecutive fours off Matthew Anderson when he was on 95. He was dismissed by Scott Muller when on 113, before the lower order fell cheaply, and going to stumps at 273/9. The final wicket fell on the third ball the following morning after 4 runs were added to the total. Queensland got off to a decent start before Jimmy Maher (10) was trapped lbw by Debashish Mohanty following an economical spell from him and Venkatesh Prasad. Matthew Hayden, the other opener, lost his wicket after making 44, that included 6 fours and a six. Law followed him after being run out for a duck with the score at 91/3. His departure brought Andrew Symonds to the crease who, with Martin Love put on 204 runs for the fourth wicket, in just 40 overs, both scoring centuries. Symonds fell in the penultimate over of the day after making 161 off 174 deliveries, an innings that included 26 fours and a six. His team finished the day at 363/7, with a lead of 86 runs.

The Indians' second innings began after bowling Queensland out for 401, and trailing by 124 runs, on the third morning. Laxman (73) put on 85 runs with Rahul Dravid (42) before both were dismissed and only Tendulkar (27) offering any further resistance. Anderson removed the tail and finished with figures of 4/50, with the Indians finishing at 204. Queensland reached the target of 81 runs in 95 minutes on the fourth and final morning with openers Law and Maher remaining unbeaten on 60 and 20, winning the match by 10 wickets.

=== Four-day: New South Wales v Indians ===
2–5 December 1999
Scorecard

Indians	v	New South Wales
185 (73.1 overs); Sourav Ganguly 38 (71); Brett Lee 3/56 (22 overs)		231 (61.4 overs); Brad Haddin 60 (62); Anil Kumble 4/50 (16.4 overs)
331 (110.3 overs); Sourav Ganguly 81 (122); Brett Lee 4/77 (30 overs)		192 (83 overs); Greg Hayne 89 (218); Anil Kumble 4/38 (21 overs)

Indians won by 93 runs
Sydney Cricket Ground, Sydney
Umpires: Darrell Hair and Simon Taufel

- Indians won the toss and elected to bat.
- Michael Clarke (New South Wales) made his first-class debut.

The Indians won the toss and elected to bat first, who were led by Sourav Ganguly while Tendulkar rested. The New South Wales rested their four Test players. Batting on an uneven pitch, the Indians were dismissed for 185. Ganguly top-scored with 38 while Brett Lee picked three wickets for 56 runs. The New South Wales went to stumps having lost one wicket, in the second over. The Indians picked up four wickets before lunch on day two reducing the New South Wales to 135/5, who were dismissed for 231, after the lower order added 96 runs in 90 minutes, securing a lead of 46 runs. Brad Haddin top-scored with 60 while Anil Kumble returned with figures of 4/50 for the Indians. The day ended with the Indians at 110/2; Sadagoppan Ramesh batting on 70. They went to lunch on day 3 at 178/5 before Ganguly (81) fell as he nicked a Don Nash delivery to the wicket-keeper. At tea, they were 279/5 having scored over 100 runs in the session, before Ajit Agarkar (65*) carried the lower order to a total of 331, setting the New South Wales a target of 286. Lee was the most successful of the bowlers again, with figures of 4/77, and Stuart MacGill with 4/84.

In reply, New South Wales started off strongly and went to stumps needing 222 runs to win with nine wickets in hand. The day was marked by a controversy after the on-field umpires ruled two decisions in the favour of the New South Wales, that led to the Indians not "getting on with the game", against who the former lodged a report with the match referee. The New South Wales began slowly on the fourth and final morning playing under overcast and humid conditions scoring just 42 runs in the first two hours and having lost one wicket. Opener Greg Hayne reached his maiden half-century from his 85th delivery and carried on while wickets kept falling at the other end in regular intervals. The Indians struck hard in the post lunch session reducing the New South Wales to 171/7 at tea; Hayne top-scoring with 89. The tail was dismissed cheaply by Kumble, who finished with 4/38, with the opposing team falling short of 93 runs from the target.

=== 50-over: Prime Minister's XI v Indians ===
7 December 1999
Scorecard

Prime Minister's XI; 334/5 (50 overs)	v	Indians; 170 (44.4 overs)
David Fitzgerald 115 (123); Thirunavukkarasu Kumaran 3/63 (9 overs)		Sourav Ganguly 46 (51); Brett Lee 4/25 (10 overs)

Prime Minister's XI won by 164 runs
Manuka Oval, Canberra
Umpires: Peter Parker and Bill Ruse
Player of the match: David Fitzgerald (Prime Minister's XI)

- Indians won the toss and elected to field.
- 334 was the highest total in a match involving the Prime Minister's XI after MCC's 332 in 1958/59.

Shane Lee led the young Prime Minister's XI side in Simon Katich's absence due to illness, while Sachin Tendulkar returned to lead the Indians. The Prime Minister's XI included Graeme Cunningham who was yet to play a first-class match till then. Winning the toss, Tendulkar opted to field on batsman-friendly conditions, and played a depleted bowling attack in the absence of Venkatesh Prasad, Javagal Srinath and Anil Kumble. The openers for the Prime Minister's XI began strongly scoring 10 runs off the first over. After the first wicket fell, David Fitzgerald and Andrew Symonds went on to score centuries; both resorting to power-hitting, also surviving multiple dismissal attempts through their innings. Chasing a target of 332, the Indians started off poorly losing both openers inside three overs. Ganguly (46) and Hrishikesh Kanitkar (45) put on 78 runs for the sixth wicket, however carried no momentum before the last five wickets fell for 48 runs. Brett Lee returned with the best figures for his team (4/25).

=== Four-day: Tasmania v Indians ===
17–20 December 1999
Scorecard

Indians	v	Tasmania
316/9d (124 overs); Rahul Dravid 107 (257); Andrew Downton 5/90 (30 overs)		548/5d (168 overs); Daniel Marsh 157 (213); Vijay Bharadwaj 3/105 (32 overs)
130/3 (61 overs); VVS Laxman 58 (112); Michael Di Venuto 1/6 (2 overs); Shaun Young 1/6 (2 overs)

Match drawn
Bellerive Oval, Hobart
Umpires: Paul Mulcahy and John Smeaton

- Indians won the toss and elected to bat.
- Wicket-keeper Mark N. Atkinson (Tasmania) effected his 200th dismissal in first-class matches.

Rahul Dravid of the Indians found form after a hitherto ordinary tour, upon his captain Ganguly won the toss and opted to bat first. His 107 included over a 114-run partnership with Hrishikesh Kanitkar who made a half-century, with the two batting for over three hours. Vijay Bharadwaj then added 58 runs with Dravid before both and VVS Laxman were dismissed in a span of 4.3 overs and 8 runs. The Indians ended the day's plat at 241/6. Upon resumption, they declared at lunch with the score at 269/9; the tail putting on an unbroken 47-run partnership. Andrew Downton finished with figures of 5/90, the best for Tasmania. In reply, Tasmania began strongly and went to stumps at 166/0, with the openers batting for over the fours hours on a slow pitch on day two, and none of the six bowlers for the Indians providing any breakthrough. At 88 overnight, captain Jamie Cox completed his century, his 24th in first-class cricket, the following morning before being dismissed for 139, while Dene Hills made 84. Daniel Marsh and Andrew Dykes then put on 104 runs for the fourth wicket, before Dykes' dismissal for 61 while Marsh batted on building another partnership, of 91 runs, with Shaun Young in the cold and windy conditions. Marsh went to stumps having faced 156 deliveries for his 118, with his team at having secured a lead of 156 runs. 20 minutes into the final morning, he reached his highest first-class score before being dismissed for 157, with his team declaring the innings at 548/5. The match ended in a draw by mutual consent after the Indians finished at 130/3; Laxman top-scoring for them (58).

== Test series ==
=== First Test ===
10–14 December 1999
Scorecard

Australia	v	India
441 (125.3 overs); Steve Waugh 150 (323); Venkatesh Prasad 3/83 (24.3 overs)		285 (113.4 overs); Sachin Tendulkar 61 (133); Shane Warne 4/92 (42 overs)
239/8d (89.5 overs); Greg Blewett 88 (262); Ajit Agarkar 3/43 (18 overs)		110 (38.1 overs); Sourav Ganguly 43 (72); Damien Fleming 5/30 (9.1 overs)

Australia won by 285 runs
Adelaide Oval, Adelaide
Umpires: Steve Dunne (NZ) and Daryl Harper (Aus)
Player of the match: Steve Waugh (Aus)

- Australia won the toss and elected to bat.
- Rain on day 1 stopped play between 11:45 and 12:00, and between 12:23 and 12:45.

=== Second Test ===
26–30 December 1999
Scorecard

Australia	v	India
405 (118.1 overs); Michael Slater 91 (179); Javagal Srinath 4/130 (33.1 overs)		238 (76.1 overs); Sachin Tendulkar 116 (191); Brett Lee 5/47 (18 overs)
208/5d (59 overs); Adam Gilchrist 55 (73); Ajit Agarkar 3/51 (17 overs)		195 (89.3 overs); Sachin Tendulkar 52 (122); Mark Waugh 2/12 (3 overs)

Australia won by 180 runs
Melbourne Cricket Ground, Melbourne
Umpires: Steve Davis (Aus) and David Shepherd (Eng)
Player of the match: Sachin Tendulkar (Ind)

- India won the toss and elected to field.
- The start on day 1 was delayed due to rain; early lunch was taken and match was started at 14:00, before bad light stopped play at 17:48.
- Bad light stopped play on day 2 at 16:07 and the third session was abandoned.
- Bad light stopped play on day 3 at 19:11.
- Rain at 10:52 delayed start until 11.24, before bad light at 11:43 delayed restart until 12:29.
- Rain on day 5 at 10:49 delayed restart until 10.54.
- Brett Lee (Aus) and Hrishikesh Kanitkar (Ind) made their Test debuts.

=== Third Test ===
2–4 January 2000
Scorecard

India	v	Australia
150 (67.5 overs); Sachin Tendulkar 45 (53); Glenn McGrath 5/48 (18.5 overs)		552/5d (140.2 overs); Justin Langer 223 (355); Javagal Srinath 2/105 (28 overs)
261 (58 overs); VVS Laxman 167 (198); Glenn McGrath 5/55 (17 overs)

Australia won by an innings and 141 runs
Sydney Cricket Ground, Sydney
Umpires: Darrell Hair (Aus) and Ian Robinson (Zim)
Player of the match: Glenn McGrath (Aus)

- India won the toss and elected to bat.
- Rain on day 1 at 12:32 prompted an early lunch and the start of the afternoon session was delayed until 15:08, before bad light at 18:19 led to abandoning of the day's play at 18:36.

The third and last Test was the New Year's Test, played at Sydney. Sachin Tendulkar won the toss for India and elected to bat first. Only 60 overs were bowled on the first day, but India had collapsed to 8–121 at the end. Tendulkar (45) was the only batsman to pass forty runs. The Indian innings folded quickly on the second day for 150. Australia started badly, going to 1–9 and later to 2–49 before Justin Langer and Ricky Ponting, who scored 223 and 141* respectively, took them past 450. An unbeaten cameo of 45 from Adam Gilchrist took them to 5–552, and Australia declared their innings closed.

India needed to cross 400 runs in the second innings just to make Australia bat again, which they had not scored even once in the entire series. But Laxman seemed to have found the form that had eluded him the entire series. The complete range of cricket strokes was on display as he flew to 167 in just 198 balls, being particularly savage on Brett Lee (taking 52 runs off 5 overs at one point) and Shane Warne. The rest of the Indian batting, however, could not stand up to the accuracy of Glenn McGrath as he took five wickets to go with the fifer in the first innings. He was declared Man of the Match, as Australia won by an innings and 141 runs.

== External sources ==
- Tour page on CricketArchive (archived)
- Tour page on ESPNcricinfo
