= 2026–27 Canberra United FC (women) season =

19th season in existence of Canberra United FC

Canberra United
2026–27 season
- Chairman: Morris McAlister
- Manager: Antoni Jagarinec
- Stadium: McKellar Park
- A-League Women: TBD
- All statistics correct as of 29 July 2026.

The 2026–27 season is Canberra United's 19th season in the A-League Women.

After months in which the club's future was uncertain and following years of financial uncertainty, in July 2026, the Australian Sports Group (ASG) acquired the club's license, including an exclusive option for a men's side. Following the acquisition and proposed salary cap increases in the league, the club re-signed coach Antoni Jagarinec for another two seasons.

== First-team squad ==
As of 23 October 2026

Note: Flags indicate national team as defined under FIFA eligibility rules; some limited exceptions apply. Players may hold more than one non-FIFA nationality.

No.	Pos.	Nation	Player
1	GK	AUS	Sally James
2	DF	AUT	Naïla Schoefberger
3	DF	NZL	Elizabeth Anton
4	DF	AUS	Tehya Aspland
5	MF	AUS	Sarah Morgan
6	FW	AUS	Lily McMahon
7	FW	AUS	Sienna Dale
8	DF	AUS	Sasha Grove
10	MF	AUS	Emily Condon
12	DF	AUS	Hayley Taylor-Young
13	FW	AUS	Sofia Christopherson
17	DF	AUS	Zoe Tolland

No.	Pos.	Nation	Player
18	GK	AUS	Coco Majstorovic
20	FW	AUS	Lillian Skelly
22	DF	PHI	Madison Ayson
23	FW	AUS	Michelle Heyman (captain)
24	FW	AUS	Caley Tallon-Henniker
25	MF	AUS	Darcey Malone
27	GK	AUS	Eliza Evans
32	MF	AUS	Bethany Gordon
33	MF	JPN	Nanako Sasaki
44	FW	NZL	Kelli Brown
—	GK	AUS	Charlotte Hrehoresin

== Transfers ==
=== Transfers in ===
No.	Position	Player	From	Type/fee	Contract length	Date	Ref
10	MF	Emily Condon	Adelaide United	Free transfer	1 year	11 September 2026	
22	DF	(Philippines) Madison Ayson	Unattached	Free transfer	1 year	18 September 2026	
5	MF	Sarah Morgan	Adelaide United	Free transfer	1 year	18 September 2026	
44	FW	(New Zealand) Kelli Brown	Unattached	Free transfer	1 year	18 September 2026	
17	DF	Zoe Tolland	Unattached	Free transfer	1 year	19 September 2026	
24	FW	Caley Tallon-Henniker	Unattached	Free transfer	1 year	21 September 2026	
4	DF	Tehya Aspland	(Australia) Canberra Olympic	Free transfer	1 year	22 September 2026	
TBA	GK	Charlotte Hrehoresin	Unattached	Free transfer	1 year	23 October 2026	
6	FW	Lily McMahon	(Australia) Northern Tigers	Free transfer	1 year	23 October 2026	
2	DF	(Austria) Naïla Schoefberger	(United States) Kansas City Current II	Free transfer	1 year	23 October 2026	

=== Transfers out ===
No.	Position	Player	Transferred to	Type/fee	Date	Ref
7	FW	(United States) Emma Hawkins	(Iceland) Valur	End of contract	13 July 2026	
28	DF	Tegan Bertolissio	Western Sydney Wanderers	End of contract	6 August 2026	
6	MF	(United States) Josie Aulicino	(Canada) Calgary Wild	End of contract	15 August 2026	
10	MF	(Serbia) Mary Stanić-Floody	(Scotland) Motherwell	End of contract	23 August 2026	
9	FW	Kiara De Domizio	Central Coast Mariners	End of contract	26 September 2026	
2	DF	Alex McKenzie	Unattached	End of contract	16 October 2026	
5	DF	(United States) Jazmin Wardlow	Unattached	End of contract	16 October 2026	
11	MF	Emma Robers	Unattached	End of contract	16 October 2026	
16	FW	Keira Bobbin	Unattached	End of contract	16 October 2026	
26	GK	Janet King	Unattached	End of contract	16 October 2026	
44	MF	Ava Briedis	Unattached	End of contract	16 October 2026	

=== Contract extensions ===
No.	Player	Position	Duration	Date	Ref.
1	Sally James	Goalkeeper	1 year	6 September 2026	
32	Bethany Gordon	Midfielder	1 year	6 September 2026	
23	Michelle Heyman	Forward	1 year	8 September 2026	
12	Hayley Taylor-Young	Defender	1 year	13 September 2026	
18	Coco Majstorovic	Goalkeeper	1 year	14 September 2026	
27	Eliza Evans	Goalkeeper	1 year	14 September 2026	
8	Sasha Grove	Defender	1 year	15 September 2026	
13	Sofia Christopherson	Forward	1 year	15 September 2026	
25	Darcey Malone	Midfielder	1 year	16 September 2026	
33	(Japan) Nanako Sasaki	Midfielder	1 year	16 September 2026	
20	Lillian Skelly	Forward	1 year	17 September 2026	
7	Sienna Dale	Forward	1 year	17 September 2026	
3	(New Zealand) Elizabeth Anton	Defender	1 year	23 September 2026	

== Competitions ==
=== Overall record ===
Competition	First match	Last match	Record							
Competition	First match	Last match	Pld	W	D	L	GF	GA	GD	Win %
A-League Women	24 October 2026	10 April 2027	5	3	0	2	3	8	−5	60.00
Total			5	3	0	2	3	8	−5	60.00

Last updated: 22 November 2026
Source: Competitions

=== A-League Women ===
==== League table ====
Pos	Team	Pld	W	D	L	GF	GA	GD	Pts	Qualification
3	Wellington Phoenix (Note: Wellington Phoenix cannot qualify for the AFC Women's Champions League as they are based in New Zealand, which is part of the Oceania Football Confederation.)	6	3	1	2	9	6	+3	10	Qualification for Finals series
4	Melbourne Victory	6	2	3	1	4	4	0	9	Qualification for Finals series
5	Canberra United	5	3	0	2	6	8	−2	9	Qualification for Finals series
6	Melbourne City	4	2	1	1	8	3	+5	7	Qualification for Finals series
7	Western Sydney Wanderers	4	2	0	2	5	4	+1	6	

Updated to match(es) played on 22 November 2026. Source: A-Leagues
Rules for classification: 1) points; 2) goal difference; 3) goals scored; 4) wins; 5) head-to-head results; 5a) head-to-head points; 5b) head-to-head goal difference; 6) Fair Play points; 7) away goal difference; 8) away goals per match; 9) home goal difference; 10) home goals per match; 11) toss of a coin in an event of a tie of two clubs.

==== Results summary ====
Overall								Home						Away					
Pld	W	D	L	GF	GA	GD	Pts	W	D	L	GF	GA	GD	W	D	L	GF	GA	GD
5	3	0	2	6	8	−2	9	1	0	1	1	2	−1	2	0	1	5	6	−1

Last updated: 22 November 2026.
Source: A-Leagues

==== Results by round ====
Round	1	2	3	4	5	6	7	8	9	10	11	12	13	14	15	16	17	18	19	20	21	22
Ground	B	A	H	A	H	A	H	H	A	H	A	A	B	H	A	H	A	A	H	A	H	H
Result	B	L	L	W	W	W							B									
Position	7	11	11	9	7	5																
Points	0	0	0	3	6	9																

Updated to match(es) played on 22 November 2026. Source: A-Leagues
A = Away; H = Home; B = Bye; W = Win; D = Draw; L = Loss; P = Postponed

==== Matches ====
Win Draw Loss Fixtures

24 October 2026 2	Central Coast Mariners	5–1	Canberra United	Gosford
15:00 AESTT	Halmarick 6'; Kapetanellis 31', 70'; Walker 55'; Karrys-Stahl 80'	Report	Dale 87'	Stadium: polytec Stadium; Referee: Charlotte Flynn

1 November 2026 3	Canberra United	0–2	Western Sydney Wanderers	Canberra
15:00 AEDT		Report	Bennett 1'; Bahr 19'	Stadium: McKellar Park; Referee: Angelique Mangjon

7 November 2026 4	Perth Glory	0–1	Canberra United	Perth
16:00 AEST		Report	Condon 55'	Stadium: HBF Park; Referee: Charlotte Flynn

15 November 2026 5	Canberra United	1–0	Brisbane Roar	Canberra
15:00 AEDT	Dale 18'	Report		Stadium: McKellar Park; Referee: Rebecca Mackie

21 November 2026 6	Sydney FC	1–3	Canberra United	Sydney
14:00	Christopherson 60'; Gordon 76' (pen.); Tallon-Henniker 88'	Report	Luchtmeijer 14'	Stadium: Sydney Olympic Park Athletic Centre; Referee: Sophie Allum

12 December 2026 7	Canberra United	v	Wellington Phoenix	Canberra
17:00 AEDT		Report		Stadium: McKellar Park

19 December 2026 8	Canberra United	v	Newcastle Jets	Canberra
14:00 AEDT		Report		Stadium: McKellar Park

28 December 2026 9	Western Sydney Wanderers	v	Canberra United	Sydney
17:00 AEDT		Report		Stadium: Wanderers Football Park

2 January 2027 10	Canberra United	v	Melbourne Victory	Canberra
14:00 AEDT		Report		Stadium: McKellar Park

9 January 2027 11	Adelaide United	v	Canberra United	Adelaide
16:20 ACDT		Report		Stadium: Coopers Stadium

16 January 2027 12	Melbourne City	v	Canberra United	Melbourne
19:45 AEDT		Report		Stadium: AAMI Park

31 January 2027 14	Canberra United	v	Central Coast Mariners	Canberra
15:00 AEDT				Stadium: McKellar Park

6 February 2027 15	Brisbane Roar	v	Canberra United	Brisbane
17:00 AEST				Stadium: Gioca Stadium

13 February 2027 16	Canberra United	v	Sydney FC	Canberra
14:00 AEDT		Report		Stadium: McKellar Park

20 February 2027 17	Newcastle Jets	–	Canberra United	Weston
13:00 AEDT		Report		Stadium: Hunter City Motor Group Stadium

14 March 2027 18	Melbourne Victory	v	Canberra United	Melbourne
15:00 AEDT		Report		Stadium: Home of the Matildas

20 March 2027 19	Canberra United	v	Adelaide United	Canberra
15:00 AEDT				Stadium: McKellar Park

28 March 2027 20	Wellington Phoenix	v	Canberra United	Porirua
15:00 NZDT				Stadium: Jerry Collins Stadium

3 April 2027 21	Canberra United	v	Melbourne City	Canberra
15:00 AEDT		Report		Stadium: McKellar Park

10 April 2027 22	Canberra United	v	Perth Glory	Canberra
15:00 AEST		Report		Stadium: McKellar Park

== Statistics ==
=== Appearances and goals ===
Players with no appearances are not included in the list.

As of match played 21 November 2026

No.	Pos	Nat	Player	Total		A-League Women	
No.	Pos	Nat	Player	Apps	Goals	Apps	Goals
1	GK	(Australia) AUS	Sally James	5	0	5	0
2	DF	(Austria) AUT	Nalia Schoefberger	3	0	0+3	0
3	DF	(New Zealand) NZL	Elizabeth Anton	4	0	4	0
5	MF	(Australia) AUS	Sarah Morgan	3	0	1+2	0
6	FW	(Australia) AUS	Lily McMahon	4	0	0+4	0
7	FW	(Australia) AUS	Sienna Dale	5	2	3+2	2
8	DF	(Australia) AUS	Sasha Grove	4	0	4	0
10	MF	(Australia) AUS	Emily Condon	5	1	4+1	1
12	DF	(Australia) AUS	Hayley Taylor-Young	4	0	4	0
13	FW	(Australia) AUS	Sofia Christopherson	5	1	5	1
17	DF	(Australia) AUS	Zoe Tolland	5	0	4+1	0
22	DF	(Philippines) PHI	Madison Ayson	5	0	5	0
23	FW	(Australia) AUS	Michelle Heyman	5	0	5	0
24	FW	(Australia) AUS	Caley Tallon-Henniker	3	1	0+3	1
25	MF	(Australia) AUS	Darcey Malone	4	0	1+3	0
32	MF	(Australia) AUS	Bethany Gordon	5	1	5	1
33	MF	(Japan) JPN	Nanako Sasaki	5	0	4+1	0
44	FW	(Australia) AUS	Kelli Brown	3	0	1+2	0

- Source: Soccerway

=== Clean sheets ===
Includes all competitions. The list is sorted by squad number when total clean sheets are equal. Numbers in parentheses represent games where both goalkeepers participated and both kept a clean sheet; the number in parentheses is awarded to the goalkeeper who was substituted on, whilst a full clean sheet is awarded to the goalkeeper who was on the field at the start of play. Goalkeepers with no clean sheets not included in the list.

As of 22 November 2026

Rank	No.	Nat.	Goalkeeper	A-League Women	Total
1	1	(Australia)	Sally James	2	2
