= 2026–27 Melbourne City FC (women) season =

12th season in existence of Melbourne City FC (women)

Melbourne City (women)
2026–27 season
- Owner: City Football Group
- Chairman: Khaldoon Al Mubarak
- Head coach: Michael Matricciani
- Stadium: ctrl:cyber Pitch; AAMI Park (doubleheaders)
- A-League Women: 6th
- AFC Women's Champions League: Quarter-finals
- Top goalscorer: League: Melina Ayres; Momo Hayashi; Cortnee Vine (2 each); All: Melina Ayres (5)
- Biggest win: 7–0 (vs Kaya–Iloilo (A), AFC Women's Champions League, 4 November 2026)
- Biggest defeat: 0–2 (vs FC Nasaf (A), AFC Women's Champions League, 1 November 2026)
Home colours	Away colours	Third colours
- All statistics correct as of 14 November 2026.

The 2026–27 season is Melbourne City Football Club's twelfth season in the A-League Women. They are also participating in the AFC Women's Champions League for the third time.

== Players ==
=== First-team squad ===
Note: Flags indicate national team as defined under FIFA eligibility rules; some limited exceptions apply. Players may hold more than one non-FIFA nationality.

No.	Pos.	Nation	Player
3	DF	ENG	Danielle Turner
4	DF	AUS	Jessika Nash
5	DF	AUS	Aimee Medwin
7	FW	AUS	Princess Ibini-Isei
8	MF	JPN	Momo Hayashi
9	FW	AUS	Cortnee Vine
10	MF	AUS	Avaani Prakash
11	FW	NZL	Deven Jackson
12	MF	AUS	Shelby McMahon
13	DF	NZL	Rebekah Stott (captain)
14	FW	AUS	Melina Ayres
15	MF	AUS	Tully Heatley
16	DF	AUS	Karly Roestbakken

No.	Pos.	Nation	Player
17	MF	AUS	Kaya Jugovic
19	DF	AUS	Keira Sarris (youth)
20	FW	USA	Kelli McGroarty
21	FW	AUS	Aideen Keane
22	MF	AUS	Taylor Ray
23	GK	AUS	Melissa Barbieri
24	GK	ESP	Malena Mieres
25	GK	AUS	Dali Gorr-Burchmore (youth)
26	FW	AUS	Izabella Rako
27	DF	AUS	Chelsea Biggs (scholarship)
28	GK	AUS	Gemma Radipitse (youth)
29	MF	AUS	Layla Habib (youth)

== Transfers ==
=== Transfers in ===
No.	Position	Player	Transferred from	Type/fee	Contract length	Date	Ref.
9	FW	Cortnee Vine	Unattached	Free transfer	1 year	11 August 2026	
14	FW	Melina Ayres	Unattached	Free transfer	2 years	14 August 2026	
10	MF	Avaani Prakash	Central Coast Mariners	Free transfer	1 year	19 August 2026	
5	DF	Aimee Medwin	Brisbane Roar	Free transfer	1 year	20 August 2026	
22	MF	Taylor Ray	Melbourne Victory	Free transfer	1 year	21 August 2026	
4	DF	Jessika Nash	Unattached	Free transfer	2 years	25 August 2026	
8	MF	(Japan) Momo Hayashi	Brisbane Roar	Free transfer	1 year	27 August 2026	
20	FW	(United States) Kelli McGroarty	(Australia) Essendon Royals	Free transfer	1 year	3 September 2026	
15	MF	Tully Heatley	(Australia) Queensland Academy of Sport	Free transfer		13 October 2026	
	FW	Princess Ibini	(Turkey) Beşiktaş	Free transfer	1 year	16 October 2026	

==== From academy squad ====
N	Pos.	Nat.	Name	Age	Notes
27	DF	(Australia)	Chelsea Biggs	18	1-year scholarship contract
28	GK	(Australia)	Gemma Radipitse	16	1-year youth development contract
29	MF	(Australia)	Layla Habib	16	1-year youth development contract

=== Transfers out ===
No.	Position	Player	Transferred to	Type/fee	Date	Ref.
8	MF	Alexia Apostolakis	(England) Bristol City	End of contract	25 June 2026	
22	FW	Bryleeh Henry	(Sweden) Rosengård	End of contract	25 June 2026	
9	FW	Holly McNamara	(England) Everton	End of contract	30 June 2026	
14	MF	(Wales) Laura Hughes	(England) Southampton	End of contract	13 July 2026	
18	MF	Leah Davidson	(England) Charlton Athletic	Undisclosed	24 July 2026	
5	DF	(United States) Taylor Otto	(Canada) Calgary Wild	End of contract	25 July 2026	
15	FW	(Nigeria) Chinaza Uchendu	Unattached	End of contract	19 August 2026	
2	DF	(England) Ellie Wilson	Unattached	End of contract	25 August 2026	
20	FW	Caitlin Karic	Unattached	End of contract	25 August 2026	
25	GK	Ayana Aoyagi	Unattached	End of contract	25 August 2026	
6	MF	Leticia McKenna	(England) Nottingham Forest	~$200,000	4 September 2026	
7	MF	Danella Butrus	Unattached	Mutual contract termination	15 October 2026	

=== Contract extensions ===
No.	Player	Position	Duration	Date	Ref.
21	Aideen Keane	Forward	1 year	4 August 2026	
16	Karly Roestbakken	Centre-back	1 year	5 August 2026	
24	(Spain) Malena Mieres	Goalkeeper	1 year	7 August 2026	
11	(New Zealand) Deven Jackson	Forward	1 year	19 August 2026	
23	Melissa Barbieri	Goalkeeper	1 year	18 September 2026	
19	Keira Sarris	Defender	1 year (youth development)	15 October 2026	
25	Dali Gorr-Burchmore	Goalkeeper	1 year (youth development)	15 October 2026	

== Competitions ==
=== Overall record ===
Competition	First match	Last match	Starting round	Record							
Competition	First match	Last match	Starting round	Pld	W	D	L	GF	GA	GD	Win %
A-League Women	18 October 2026	11 April 2027	Matchday 1	4	2	1	1	8	3	+5	50.00
AFC Women's Champions League	1 November 2026	TBD	Group stage	3	2	0	1	9	2	+7	66.67
Total				7	4	1	2	17	5	+12	57.14

Last updated: 21 November 2026
Source: Competitions

=== A-League Women ===
==== League table ====
Pos	Team	Pld	W	D	L	GF	GA	GD	Pts	Qualification
3	Wellington Phoenix (Note: Wellington Phoenix cannot qualify for the AFC Women's Champions League as they are based in New Zealand, which is part of the Oceania Football Confederation.)	6	3	1	2	9	6	+3	10	Qualification for Finals series
4	Melbourne Victory	6	2	3	1	4	4	0	9	Qualification for Finals series
5	Melbourne City	3	2	1	0	8	2	+6	7	Qualification for Finals series
6	Sydney FC	5	2	1	2	7	11	−4	7	Qualification for Finals series
7	Western Sydney Wanderers	4	2	0	2	5	4	+1	6	

Updated to match(es) played on 22 November 2026. Source: A-Leagues
Rules for classification: 1) points; 2) goal difference; 3) goals scored; 4) wins; 5) head-to-head results; 5a) head-to-head points; 5b) head-to-head goal difference; 6) Fair Play points; 7) away goal difference; 8) away goals per match; 9) home goal difference; 10) home goals per match; 11) toss of a coin in an event of a tie of two clubs.

==== Results summary ====
Overall								Home						Away					
Pld	W	D	L	GF	GA	GD	Pts	W	D	L	GF	GA	GD	W	D	L	GF	GA	GD
4	2	1	1	8	3	+5	7	0	1	0	1	1	0	2	0	1	7	2	+5

Last updated: 21 November 2026.
Source: A-Leagues

==== Results by round ====
Round	1	2	3	4	5	6	7	8	9	10	11	12	13	14	15	16	17	18	19	20	21	22
Ground	A	A	B	H	A	A	H	H	A	H	A	H	H	A	H	A	A	H	H	B	A	H
Result	W	W	B	P	D	L														B		
Position	2	2	4	4	4	6																

Updated to match(es) played on 21 November 2026. Source: A-Leagues
A = Away; H = Home; B = Bye; W = Win; D = Draw; L = Loss; P = Postponed

==== Matches ====
The league fixtures were released on 21 August 2026.

Win Draw Loss Fixtures

18 October 2026 1	Wellington Phoenix	1–2	Melbourne City	Wellington
12:15 NZDT	Woods 51'	Report	Ayres 73' (pen.); Hayashi 87'	Stadium: Hnry Stadium; Referee: Casey Reibelt

25 October 2026 2	Sydney FC	0–5	Melbourne City	Sydney
18:50 AEDT		Report	Vine 13'; Hayashi 16'; Jackson 24'; McLean 30' (o.g.); Ayres 53' (pen.)	Stadium: Allianz Stadium; Referee: Sophie Allum
Note: Originally scheduled for a 17:45 kick-off, this match was delayed an hour due to lightning.

14 November 2026 5	Melbourne City	1–1	Newcastle Jets	Melbourne
15:00 AEDT	Vine 42'	Report	Prior 69'	Stadium: ctrl:cyber Pitch; Referee: Mikayla Ryan

21 November 2026 6	Brisbane Roar	1–0	Melbourne City	Brisbane
15:50 AEST	Roach 48'	Report		Stadium: Kayo Stadium; Referee: Caitlin Williams

12 December 2026 7	Perth Glory	v	Melbourne City	Perth
17:00 AWST		Report		Stadium: Sam Kerr Football Centre

19 December 2026 8	Melbourne City	v	Melbourne Victory	Melbourne
17:00 AEDT		Report		Stadium: AAMI Park

27 December 2026 9	Melbourne City	v	Sydney FC	Melbourne
15:30 AEDT		Report		Stadium: AAMI Park

31 December 2026 10	Central Coast Mariners	v	Melbourne City	Gosford
16:50 AEDT		Report		Stadium: Polytec Stadium

6 January 2027 4	Melbourne City	v	Western Sydney Wanderers	Melbourne
17:50 AEDT		Report		Stadium: ctrl:cyber Pitch
Note: Due to Melbourne City's participation in the 2026–27 AFC Women's Champions League this match was rescheduled to match week 11 prior to the season commencing.

10 January 2027 11	Newcastle Jets	v	Melbourne City	Maitland
17:00 AEST		Report		Stadium: Maitland Regional Sportsground

16 January 2027 12	Melbourne City	v	Canberra United	Melbourne
19:45 AEDT		Report		Stadium: AAMI Park

24 January 2027 13	Melbourne City	v	Wellington Phoenix	Melbourne
17:00 AEDT		Report		Stadium: ctrl:cyber Pitch

29 January 2027 14	Adelaide United	v	Melbourne City	Adelaide
16:10 ACDT		Report		Stadium: Coopers Stadium

7 February 2027 15	Melbourne City	v	Perth Glory	Melbourne
17:00 AEDT		Report		Stadium: ctrl:cyber Pitch

13 February 2027 16	Western Sydney Wanderers	v	Melbourne City	Sydney
18:00 AEDT		Report		Stadium: Wanderers Football Park

21 February 2027 17	Melbourne Victory	v	Melbourne City	Melbourne
17:00 AEDT		Report		Stadium: Home of the Matildas

13 March 2027 18	Melbourne City	v	Brisbane Roar	Melbourne
15:00 AEDT		Report		Stadium: ctrl:cyber Pitch

21 March 2027 19	Melbourne City	v	Central Coast Mariners	Melbourne
19:45 AEDT		Report		Stadium: AAMI Park

3 April 2027 21	Canberra United	v	Melbourne City	Canberra
15:00 AEDT		Report		Stadium: McKellar Park

11 April 2027 22	Melbourne City	v	Adelaide United	Melbourne
15:00 AEST		Report		Stadium: ctrl:cyber Pitch

=== AFC Women's Champions League ===
As a result of becoming premiers of the 2025–26 A-League Women, Melbourne City qualified for the group stage, which was their third straight qualification for this competition. They were second in their group, and qualified to the knockout stage as the best second-placed team, earling them seeding in the quarter-final draw and a home game in March 2027.

==== Group stage ====
Pos	Team	Pld	W	D	L	GF	GA	GD	Pts	Qualification
1	(Uzbekistan) Nasaf (H)	3	2	0	1	7	2	+5	6 (Note: Tied on head-to-head points. Head-to-head goal difference was used as the tiebreaker; Nasaf +1, Melbourne City 0, Beijing Jingtan −1.)	Advance to Quarter-finals
2	(Australia) Melbourne City	3	2	0	1	9	2	+7	6	Advance to Quarter-finals
3	(China) Beijing Jingtan	3	2	0	1	8	3	+5	6	Advance to Quarter-finals
4	(Philippines) Kaya–Iloilo	3	0	0	3	0	17	−17	0	

Source: AFC
Rules for classification: Tiebreakers
(H) Hosts
Notes:

1 November 2026 Group stage	Melbourne City (Australia)	0–2	(Uzbekistan) Nasaf	Qarshi, Uzbekistan
19:30 UZT		Report	Khabibullaeva 1'; Karachik 86'	Stadium: Markaziy Stadium; Attendance: 313; Referee: Ranjita Devi Tekcham (India)

4 November 2026 Group stage	Kaya–Iloilo (Philippines)	0–7	(Australia) Melbourne City	Qarshi, Uzbekistan
15:30 UZT		Report	McGroarty 47', 66'; Hayashi 64'; Ayres 71', 84'; Vine 72', 90+2'	Stadium: Markaziy Stadium; Attendance: 50; Referee: Doumouh Al Bakkar (Lebanon)

7 November 2026 Group stage	Melbourne City (Australia)	2–0	(China) Beijing Jingtan	Qarshi, Uzbekistan
15:30 UZT	Ayres 14' (pen.); Keane 89'	Report		Stadium: Markaziy Stadium; Referee: Lê Thị Ly (Vietnam)

==== Knockout stage ====
27–28 March 2027 Quarter-final	Melbourne City (Australia)	v	TBD	Melbourne, Australia

== Statistics ==
=== Appearances and goals ===
Starting appearances are listed first, followed by substitute appearances after the + symbol where applicable.

As of match played 21 November 2026

No.	Pos	Nat	Player	Total		A-League Women		A-League Women Finals		AFC Women's Champions League	
No.	Pos	Nat	Player	Apps	Goals	Apps	Goals	Apps	Goals	Apps	Goals
4	DF	(Australia) AUS	Jessika Nash	4	0	2+1	0	0	0	1	0
5	DF	(Australia) AUS	Aimee Medwin	7	0	3+1	0	0	0	2+1	0
8	MF	(Japan) JPN	Momo Hayashi	7	3	4	2	0	0	3	1
9	FW	(Australia) AUS	Cortnee Vine	6	4	3	2	0	0	2+1	2
10	FW	(Australia) AUS	Avaani Prakash	5	0	1+2	0	0	0	2	0
11	FW	(New Zealand) NZL	Deven Jackson	7	1	4	1	0	0	3	0
12	MF	(Australia) AUS	Shelby McMahon	5	0	3	0	0	0	2	0
13	DF	(New Zealand) NZL	Rebekah Stott	7	0	3+1	0	0	0	3	0
14	FW	(Australia) AUS	Melina Ayres	7	5	4	2	0	0	3	3
15	MF	(Australia) AUS	Tully Heatley	4	0	0+2	0	0	0	0+2	0
16	DF	(Australia) AUS	Karly Roestbakken	7	0	4	0	0	0	2+1	0
20	FW	(United States) USA	Kelli McGroarty	7	2	1+3	0	0	0	1+2	2
21	FW	(Australia) AUS	Aideen Keane	7	1	4	0	0	0	3	1
22	MF	(Australia) AUS	Taylor Ray	7	0	4	0	0	0	3	0
24	GK	(Spain) ESP	Malena Mieres	7	0	4	0	0	0	3	0
26	FW	(Australia) AUS	Izabella Rako	1	0	0+1	0	0	0	0	0
27	DF	(Australia) AUS	Chelsea Biggs	2	0	0+1	0	0	0	0+1	0

- Source: Soccerway

=== Disciplinary record ===
As of match played 21 November 2026

No.	Pos	Nat	Player	Total			A-League Women			A-League Women Finals			AFC Women's Champions League		
No.	Pos	Nat	Player	Yellow card	Second yellow card	Red card	Yellow card	Second yellow card	Red card	Yellow card	Second yellow card	Red card	Yellow card	Second yellow card	Red card
4	DF	(Australia) AUS	Jessika Nash	1	0	0	1	0	0	0	0	0	0	0	0
12	MF	(Australia) AUS	Shelby McMahon	1	0	0	1	0	0	0	0	0	0	0	0
22	MF	(Australia) AUS	Taylor Ray	1	0	0	0	0	0	0	0	0	1	0	0

- Source: Soccerway
- (yellow card) = Number of bookings; (second yellow card) = Number of sending offs after a second yellow card; (red card) = Number of sending offs by a direct red card.

=== Clean sheets ===
As of match played 21 November 2026

Rank	No.	Nat.	Goalkeeper	A-League Women	A-League Women Finals	AFC Women's Champions League	Total
1	24	(Spain)	Malena Mieres	1	0	2	3
Total				1	0	2	3

== See also ==
- 2026–27 Melbourne City FC season
