= 2026–27 Adelaide United FC (women) season =

19th season in existence of Adelaide United FC (women)

Adelaide United FC (women)
2026–27 season
- Chairman: Ned Morris
- Head Coach: Theo Tsiounis
- Stadium: Coopers Stadium; Marden Sports Complex
- A-League Women: TBD
Home colours	Away colours
- All statistics correct as of 24 June 2026.

The 2026–27 season is Adelaide United Football Club (women)'s 19th season in the A-League Women.

== Players ==
=== Squad information ===
Note: Flags indicate national team as defined under FIFA eligibility rules; some limited exceptions apply. Players may hold more than one non-FIFA nationality.

No.	Pos.	Nation	Player
1	GK	AUS	Ilona Melegh
2	DF	AUS	Emily Hodgson
3	DF	AUS	Claudia Cicco
4	DF	AUS	Holly Murray
5	DF	AUS	India Breier (scholarship)
6	MF	AUS	Melissa Taranto
7	FW	AUS	Emilia Makris
8	MF	AUS	Paige Zois
9	MF	AUS	Kiera Meyers
10	FW	AUS	Chelsie Dawber
11	FW	USA	Tessa Salvestrin

No.	Pos.	Nation	Player
12	FW	AUS	Carina Rossi
14	MF	AUS	Maeve Nicholas (scholarship)
15	MF	AUS	Adriana Taranto (captain)
16	DF	USA	Bella Yakel
18	GK	AUS	Amelie Millar
21	GK	NZL	Claudia Jenkins
23	DF	JAM	Tianna Harris
25	FW	AUS	Lara Gooch
27	MF	AUS	Sian Dewey
99	GK	AUS	Mia Trimboli (youth development)

== Transfers ==
=== Transfers in ===
No.	Position	Player	From	Type/fee	Contract length	Date	Ref
3	DF	Claudia Cicco	Newcastle Jets	Free transfer	2 years	24 July 2026	
11	FW	(United States) Tessa Salvestrin	(Portugal) Torreense	Free transfer	1 year	26 August 2026	
5	DF	India Breier	Unattached	Scholarship	1 year	11 September 2026	
9	MF	Kiera Meyers	Unattached	Free transfer	1 year	11 September 2026	
16	DF	(United States) Bella Yakel	Unattached	Free transfer	1 year	22 September 2026	
23	DF	(Jamaica) Tianna Harris	Unattached	Free transfer	1 year	22 September 2026	

=== Transfers out ===
No.	Position	Player	Transferred to	Type/fee	Date	Ref
17	DF	Zoe Tolland	Unattached	End of contract	28 May 2026	
19	FW	Katie Bowler	Unattached	End of contract	28 May 2026	
11	FW	Isabel Hodgson	Unattached	End of contract	29 May 2026	
28	FW	Gracen Blieschke	(United States) Southern Utah Thunderbirds	End of contract	30 June 2026	
3	DF	Matilda McNamara	(Portugal) Racing Power	Undisclosed	2 July 2026	
13	DF	Ella Tonkin	(Portugal) Torreense	End of contract	2 July 2026	
22	FW	(Republic of Ireland) Erin Healy	(Italy) Parma	End of contract	2 July 2026	
16	MF	Dylan Holmes	Unattached	End of contract	23 July 2026	
8	MF	Emily Condon	Canberra United	End of contract	10 September 2026	
5	MF	Sarah Morgan	Canberra United	End of contract	18 September 2026	

=== Contract extensions ===
No.	Player	Position	Duration	Date	Notes
6	Melissa Taranto	Midfielder	1 year	1 June 2026	
15	Adriana Taranto	Midfielder	1 year	1 June 2026	
4	Holly Murray	Defender	2 years	3 July 2026	
12	Carina Rossi	Forward	2 years	3 July 2026	
14	Maeve Nicholas	Midfielder	1 year	22 September 2026	scholarship
18	Amelie Millar	Goalkeeper		15 October 2026	scholarship

== Competitions ==
=== Overall record ===
Competition	First match	Last match	Record							
Competition	First match	Last match	Pld	W	D	L	GF	GA	GD	Win %
A-League Women	18 October 2026	TBD	1	0	1	0	2	2	+0	0.00
Total			1	0	1	0	2	2	+0	0.00

Last updated: 18 October 2026
Source: Competitions

=== A-League Women ===
==== League table ====
Pos	Team	Pld	W	D	L	GF	GA	GD	Pts
7	Western Sydney Wanderers	4	2	0	2	5	4	+1	6
8	Canberra United	5	2	0	3	4	10	−6	6
9	Brisbane Roar	5	1	0	4	5	9	−4	3
10	Adelaide United	5	0	3	2	3	7	−4	3
11	Newcastle Jets	4	0	2	2	2	4	−2	2

Updated to match(es) played on 22 November 2026. Source: A-Leagues
Rules for classification: 1) points; 2) goal difference; 3) goals scored; 4) wins; 5) head-to-head results; 5a) head-to-head points; 5b) head-to-head goal difference; 6) Fair Play points; 7) away goal difference; 8) away goals per match; 9) home goal difference; 10) home goals per match; 11) toss of a coin in an event of a tie of two clubs.

==== Results summary ====
Overall								Home						Away					
Pld	W	D	L	GF	GA	GD	Pts	W	D	L	GF	GA	GD	W	D	L	GF	GA	GD
1	0	1	0	2	2	0	1	0	0	0	0	0	0	0	1	0	2	2	0

Last updated: 18 October 2026.
Source: A-Leagues

==== Results by round ====
Round	1	2	3	4	5	6	7	8	9	10	11	12	13	14	15	16	17	18	19	20	21	22
Ground	A	H	A	H	A	A	H	B	H	A	H	A	A	H	H	A	B	H	A	H	H	A
Result	D							B									B					
Position	5																					
Points	1																					

Updated to match(es) played on 18 October 2026. Source: A-Leagues
A = Away; H = Home; B = Bye; W = Win; D = Draw; L = Loss; P = Postponed

==== Matches ====
Win Draw Loss Fixtures Postponed

18 October 2026 1	Sydney FC	2–2	Adelaide United	Sydney
16:30 AEDT	Sutton 6'; Cohn 55'	Report	McLean 8' (o.g.); Breier 88'	Stadium: Sydney Olympic Park Athletic Centre; Referee: Noah Moss

24 October 2026 2	Adelaide United	0–0	Perth Glory	Adelaide
16:30 ACDT		Report		Stadium: Service FM Stadium; Referee: Caitlin Williams

31 October 2026 3	Central Coast Mariners	2–0	Adelaide United	Gosford
17:00 AEDT	Kapetanellis 10', 53'	Report		Stadium: polytech Stadium

6 November 2026 4	Adelaide United	0–2	Wellington Phoenix	Adelaide
18:30 ACDT		Report	Yallop 15'; Paige-Riley 88'	Stadium: Service FM Stadium

14 November 2026 5	Melbourne Victory	1–1	Adelaide United	Melbourne
15:00 AEDT	O'Grady 35'	Report	Salvestrin 3' (pen.)	Stadium: Home of the Matildas

TBD 6	Newcastle Jets	Postponed	Adelaide United	TBD
		Report		Stadium: TBD

11 December 2026 7	Adelaide United	v	Sydney FC	Adelaide
16:20 ACDT		Report		Stadium: Coopers Stadium

27 December 2026 9	Adelaide United	v	Central Coast Mariners	Adelaide
16:20 ACDT				Stadium: Coopers Stadium

2 January 2027 10	Western Sydney Wanderers	v	Adelaide United	Sydney
18:00 AWST				Stadium: Wanderers Football Park

9 January 2027 11	Adelaide United	v	Canberra United	Adelaide
16:20 ACDT		Report		Stadium: Coopers Stadium

17 January 2027 12	Brisbane Roar	v	Adelaide United	Brisbane
16:00 AEST				Stadium: Gioca Stadium

23 January 2027 13	Perth Glory	v	Adelaide United	Perth
17:00 AWST		Report		Stadium: Sam Kerr Football Centre

29 January 2027 14	Adelaide United	v	Melbourne City	Adelaide
16:20 ACDT		Report		Stadium: Coopers Stadium

6 February 2027 15	Adelaide United	v	Melbourne Victory	Adelaide
16:20 ACDT		Report		Stadium: Coopers Stadium

14 February 2027 16	Wellington Phoenix	v	Adelaide United	Porirua
15:00 NZDT				Stadium: Jerry Collins Stadium

13 March 2027 18	Adelaide United	v	Western Sydney Wanderers	Adelaide
16:30 ACDT				Stadium: Coopers Stadium

20 March 2027 19	Canberra United	v	Adelaide United	Canberra
15:00 AEDT				Stadium: McKellar Park

27 March 2027 20	Adelaide United	v	Brisbane Roar	Adelaide
14:30 ACDT				Stadium: Service FM Stadium

2 April 2027 21	Adelaide United	v	Newcastle Jets	Adelaide
16:20 ACDT		Report		Stadium: Coopers Stadium

11 April 2027 22	Melbourne City	v	Adelaide United	Melbourne
15:00 AEST		Report		Stadium: ctrl:cyber Pitch

== Statistics ==
=== Appearances and goals ===
Players with no appearances are not included in the list.

As of match played 18 October 2026

No.	Pos	Nat	Player	Total		A-League Women	
No.	Pos	Nat	Player	Apps	Goals	Apps	Goals
1	GK	(Australia) AUS	Ilona Melegh	1	0	1	0
2	DF	(Australia) AUS	Emily Hodgson	1	0	1	0
3	DF	(Australia) AUS	Claudia Cicco	1	0	1	0
4	DF	(Australia) AUS	Holly Murray	1	0	1	0
5	MF	(Australia) AUS	India Breier	1	1	0+1	1
6	MF	(Australia) AUS	Melissa Taranto	1	0	1	0
7	FW	(Australia) AUS	Emilia Murray	1	0	0+1	0
8	MF	(Australia) AUS	Paige Zois	1	0	1	0
9	FW	(Australia) AUS	Kiera Meyers	1	0	0+1	0
10	FW	(Australia) AUS	Chelsie Dawber	1	0	1	0
12	FW	(Australia) AUS	Carina Rossi	1	0	1	0
15	MF	(Australia) AUS	Adriana Taranto	1	0	1	0
16	DF	(United States) USA	Bella Yakel	1	0	1	0
23	DF	(Jamaica) JAM	Tianna Harris	1	0	0+1	0
25	FW	(Australia) AUS	Laura Gooch	1	0	0+1	0
29	MF	(Australia) AUS	Daisy Drawwater	1	0	0+1	0

- Source: Soccerway

== See also ==
- 2026–27 Adelaide United FC season
