= 2026–27 Melbourne Victory FC (women) season =

19th season in existence of Melbourne Victory FC (women)

Melbourne Victory (A-League Women)
2026–27 season
- Chairman: John Dovaston
- Manager: Jeff Hopkins
- Stadium: The Home of the Matildas; AAMI Park (doubleheaders)
- A-League Women: TBD
- A-League Women Finals: TBD
Home colours	Away colours
- All statistics correct as of 29 July 2026.

The 2026–27 season is Melbourne Victory Football Club (women)'s 19th season in the A-League Women.

== Players ==
=== First-team squad ===
As of 15 October 2026

Note: Flags indicate national team as defined under FIFA eligibility rules; some limited exceptions apply. Players may hold more than one non-FIFA nationality.

No.	Pos.	Nation	Player
1	GK	AUS	Courtney Newbon
2	MF	PHI	Skye Leach
3	DF	NZL	Claudia Bunge (vice-captain)
4	DF	AUS	Chelsea Blissett
7	FW	AUS	Ella O'Grady
8	FW	AUS	Sophie Harding
9	FW	AUS	Holly Furphy
10	MF	AUS	Sienna Saveska
11	FW	AUS	Nickoletta Flannery
13	DF	PHI	Angela Beard
14	MF	AUS	Alicia Woods
16	DF	SUI	Anna Sutter

No.	Pos.	Nation	Player
17	MF	AUS	Poppy O'Keeffe (scholarship)
18	DF	USA	Kayla Morrison (captain)
19	DF	NZL	Zoe McMeeken
20	FW	AUS	Leyla Hussein (scholarship)
21	FW	AUS	Jasmine Millar (youth)
25	GK	AUS	Ayana Aoyagi
28	FW	AUS	Sienna Techera (scholarship)
30	GK	AUS	Chloe McKenzie (scholarship)
31	GK	AUS	Shaylee Lane (youth)
66	FW	AUS	Alana Jančevski
81	MF	AUS	Grace Maher

== Transfers ==
=== Transfers in ===
No.	Position	Player	From	Type/fee	Contract length	Date	Ref
13	DF	(Philippines) Angela Beard	Unattached	Free transfer	1 year	16 September 2026	
25	GK	Ayana Aoyagi	Unattached	Free transfer	1 year	16 September 2026	
14	MF	Alicia Woods	Unattached	Free transfer	1 year	16 September 2026	
8	FW	Sophie Harding	Unattached	Free transfer	1 year	16 September 2026	
2	MF	(Philippines) Skye Leach	Unattached	Free transfer	1 year	17 September 2026	
16	DF	(Switzerland) Anna Sutter	(Sweden) Eskilstuna United	Free transfer		15 October 2026	

==== From academy squad ====
N	Pos.	Nat.	Name	Age	Notes
21	FW	(Australia)	Jasmine Millar	17	youth development agreement
31	GK	(Australia)	Shaylee Lane	16	youth development agreement

=== Transfers out ===
No.	Position	Player	Transferred to	Type/fee	Date	Ref
16	FW	(United States) Kennedy White	(United States) Tampa Bay Sun	End of contract	20 May 2026	
21	GK	Natalie Picak	TBA	End of contract	20 May 2026	
23	MF	Rachel Lowe	(England) Durham	End of contract	20 May 2026	
30	GK	(United States) Payton Woodward	TBA	End of contract	20 May 2026	
6	MF	Taylor Ray	Melbourne City	End of contract	19 August 2026	
10	MF	Rhianna Pollicina	Western Sydney Wanderers	End of contract	26 August 2026	
27	MF	Rosie Curtis	Brisbane Roar	End of contract	29 August 2026	
5	MF	Sofia Sakalis	Unattached	End of contract	21 September 2026	
24	MF	Laura Pickett	Unattached	Mutual contract termination	21 September 2026	
14	FW	Fiorina Iaria	Central Coast Mariners	End of contract	13 October 2026	
41	MF	Jessica Young	Unattached	End of contract	16 October 2026	

=== Contract extensions ===
No.	Player	Position	Duration	Date	Ref.
7	Ella O'Grady	Forward	1 year	7 September 2026	
10	Sienna Saveska	Midfielder	1 year	7 September 2026	
9	Holly Furphy	Forward	1 year	7 September 2026	
24	Laura Pickett	Midfielder	1 year	7 September 2026	
66	Alana Jancevski	Forward	1 year	7 September 2026	
81	Grace Maher	Midfielder	1 year	7 September 2026	
3	(New Zealand) Claudia Bunge	Defender	1 year	14 September 2026	
4	Chelsea Blissett	Left-back	1 year	14 September 2026	
1	Courtney Newbon	Goalkeeper	1 year	15 September 2026	
11	Nicki Flannery	Forward	1 year	15 September 2026	
19	(New Zealand) Zoe McMeeken	Full-back	1 year	15 September 2026	
17	Poppy O'Keeffe	Midfielder	1 year (scholarship)	7 October 2026	
20	Leyla Hussein	Forward	1 year (scholarship)	7 October 2026	
30	Chloe McKenzie	Goalkeeper	1 year (scholarship)	7 October 2026	
28	Sienna Techera	Winger	1 year (scholarship)	7 October 2026	

== Competitions ==
=== Overall record ===
Competition	First match	Last match	Record							
Competition	First match	Last match	Pld	W	D	L	GF	GA	GD	Win %
A-League Women	17 October 2026	10 April 2027	5	2	2	1	4	4	+0	40.00
Total			5	2	2	1	4	4	+0	40.00

Last updated: 14 November 2026
Source: Competitions

=== A-League Women ===
==== League table ====
Pos	Team	Pld	W	D	L	GF	GA	GD	Pts	Qualification
2	Central Coast Mariners	5	3	1	1	12	5	+7	10	Qualification for Finals series
3	Wellington Phoenix (Note: Wellington Phoenix cannot qualify for the AFC Women's Champions League as they are based in New Zealand, which is part of the Oceania Football Confederation.)	6	3	1	2	9	6	+3	10	Qualification for Finals series
4	Melbourne Victory	6	2	3	1	4	4	0	9	Qualification for Finals series
5	Melbourne City	3	2	1	0	8	2	+6	7	Qualification for Finals series
6	Sydney FC	5	2	1	2	7	11	−4	7	Qualification for Finals series

Updated to match(es) played on 22 November 2026. Source: A-Leagues
Rules for classification: 1) points; 2) goal difference; 3) goals scored; 4) wins; 5) head-to-head results; 5a) head-to-head points; 5b) head-to-head goal difference; 6) Fair Play points; 7) away goal difference; 8) away goals per match; 9) home goal difference; 10) home goals per match; 11) toss of a coin in an event of a tie of two clubs.

==== Matches ====
The league fixtures were released on 21 August 2026.

Win Draw Loss Fixtures

17 October 2026 1	Western Sydney Wanderers	0–1	Melbourne Victory	Sydney
15:00 AEDT		Report	Jančevski 32'	Stadium: Blacktown International Sportspark

25 October 2026 2	Wellington Phoenix	1–1	Melbourne Victory	Wellington
12:15 NZDT	Woods 63'	Report	Furphy 40'	Stadium: Hnry Stadium; Attendance: 1,897; Referee: Sarah Jones

1 November 2026 3	Melbourne Victory	1–0	Newcastle Jets	Melbourne
17:45 AEDT	Saveska 25'	Report		Stadium: AAMI Park

7 November 2026 4	Brisbane Roar	2–0	Melbourne Victory	Brisbane
14:00 AEST	Agnew 36'; Markovski 45+2'	Report		Stadium: Gioca Stadium

14 November 2026 5	Melbourne Victory	1–1	Adelaide United	Melbourne
15:00 AEDT	O'Grady 35'	Report	Salvestrin 3' (pen.)	Stadium: Home of the Matildas

22 November 2026 6	Melbourne Victory	0–0	Perth Glory	Melbourne
14:00 AEDT		Report		Stadium: The Home of the Matildas

19 December 2026 8	Melbourne City	v	Melbourne Victory	Melbourne
17:00 AEDT		Report		Stadium: AAMI Park

29 December 2026 9	Melbourne Victory	v	Wellington Phoenix	Melbourne
16:50 AEDT				Stadium: AAMI Park

2 January 2027 10	Canberra United	v	Melbourne Victory	Canberra
14:00 AEDT		Report		Stadium: McKellar Park

9 January 2027 11	Melbourne Victory	v	Western Sydney Wanderers	Melbourne
17:00 AEDT		Report		Stadium: Home of the Matildas

15 January 2027 12	Melbourne Victory	v	Central Coast Mariners	Melbourne
16:50 AEDT		Report		Stadium: AAMI Stadium

23 January 2027 13	Sydney FC	v	Melbourne Victory	TBC
17:00 AEDT		Report		Stadium: TBC

30 January 2027 14	Melbourne Victory	v	Brisbane Roar	Melbourne
17:00 AEDT				Stadium: Home of the Matildas

6 February 2027 15	Adelaide United	v	Melbourne Victory	Adelaide
16:20 ACDT		Report		Stadium: Coopers Stadium

14 February 2027 16	Newcastle Jets	–	Melbourne Victory	Weston
17:00 AEDT		Report		Stadium: Hunter City Motor Group Stadium

21 February 2027 17	Melbourne Victory	v	Melbourne City	Melbourne
17:00 AEDT		Report		Stadium: Home of the Matildas

14 March 2027 18	Melbourne Victory	v	Canberra United	Melbourne
15:00 AEDT		Report		Stadium: Home of the Matildas

27 March 2027 20	Central Coast Mariners	v	Melbourne Victory	Gosford
15:00 AEDT		Report		Stadium: Polytec Stadium

4 April 2027 21	Perth Glory	v	Melbourne Victory	Perth
17:00 AWST		Report		Stadium: Sam Kerr Football Centre

10 April 2027 22	Melbourne Victory	v	Sydney FC	Melbourne
18:00 AEDT		Report		Stadium: AAMI Stadium

== See also ==
- 2026–27 Melbourne Victory FC season
