= 2026–27 A-League Women =

Nineteenth edition of the top Australian women's football (soccer) league

A-League Women
- Season: 2026–27
- Dates: 17 October 2026 to May 2027
- Matches: 10
- Goals: 32 (3.2 per match)
- Top goalscorer: Talia Kapetanellis (5 goals)
- Biggest home win: Central Coast Mariners 5–1 Canberra United (24 October 2026)
- Biggest away win: Sydney FC 0–5 Melbourne City (25 October 2026)
- Highest scoring: Brisbane Roar 2–4 Central Coast Mariners (17 October 2026); Central Coast Mariners 5–1 Canberra United (24 October 2026)
- Longest winning run: 3 matches Central Coast Mariners
- Longest unbeaten run: 3 matches 3 teams
- Longest winless run: 3 matches 3 teams
- Longest losing run: 3 matches Brisbane Roar
- All statistics correct as of 1 November 2026. (Note: Longest runs only include regular season results)

The 2026–27 A-League Women, known as the Ninja A-League for sponsorship reasons, is the nineteenth season of A-League Women, the Australian national women's soccer competition.

Melbourne City are the defending premiers and the defending champions.

== Clubs ==
=== Stadiums and locations ===

Club	City	Home ground	Capacity
Adelaide United	Adelaide	Coopers Stadium	16,500
Adelaide United	Adelaide	Marden Sports Complex	6,000
Adelaide United	Adelaide	ServiceFM Stadium	7,000
Brisbane Roar	Brisbane	Imperial Corp Stadium	5,000
Canberra United	Canberra	McKellar Park	3,500
Central Coast Mariners	Gosford	Industree Group Stadium	20,059
Central Coast Mariners	Woy Woy	Woy Woy Oval	1,500
Melbourne City	Melbourne	AAMI Park	30,050
Melbourne City	Melbourne	City Football Academy	9,000
Melbourne Victory	Melbourne	AAMI Park	30,050
Melbourne Victory	Melbourne	The Home of the Matildas	3,000
Newcastle Jets	Newcastle	Newcastle Number 2 Sports Ground	5,000
Newcastle Jets	Newcastle	McDonald Jones Stadium	33,000
Newcastle Jets	Maitland	Maitland Regional Sportsground	8,000
Newcastle Jets	Weston	Hunter City Motor Group Stadium	5,000
Perth Glory	Perth	Sam Kerr Football Centre	2,500
Perth Glory	Perth	HBF Park	20,500
Sydney FC	Wollongong	WIN Stadium	23,750
Sydney FC	Sydney	Sydney Olympic Park Athletic Centre	5,000
Sydney FC	Sydney	Allianz Stadium	42,500
Wellington Phoenix	Porirua	Jerry Collins Stadium	1,900
Western Sydney Wanderers	Sydney	CommBank Stadium	30,000
Western Sydney Wanderers	Sydney	Wanderers Football Park	1,000

=== Personnel and kits ===
Team	Manager	Captain	Kit manufacturers	Kit sponsors
Adelaide United	(Australia) Theo Tsiounis	(Australia) Adriana Taranto	UCAN	Lendux
Brisbane Roar	(Australia) Johnathan Clemente	(Australia) Natalie Tathem	Kelme	Ausenco
Canberra United	(Australia) Antoni Jagarinec	(Australia) Michelle Heyman	KonQa	University of Canberra; ClubLime (Note: Away kit)
Central Coast Mariners	(Australia) Dean Heffernan	(Australia) Taren King	KonQa	Holman Barnes Group
Melbourne City	(Australia) Michael Matricciani	(New Zealand) Rebekah Stott	Puma	Etihad Airways
Melbourne Victory	(Wales) Jeff Hopkins	(United States) Kayla Morrison	Elite Eleven	Turkish Airlines
Newcastle Jets	(England) Stephen Hoyle	(Australia) Cassidy Davis	New Balance	nib
Perth Glory	(Australia) Stephen Peters	(Australia) Isobel Dalton	Macron	APD Global
Sydney FC	(Australia) James Slaveski	(Australia) Natalie Tobin	Under Armour	Macquarie University
Wellington Phoenix	(England) Bev Priestman	(New Zealand) CJ Bott	Dynasty Sport	Oppo; Entelar Group
Western Sydney Wanderers	(Australia) Geoff Abrahams	(Australia) Rhianna Pollicina	Adidas	Herbalife

=== Managerial changes ===
Team	Outgoing manager	Manner of departure	Date of vacancy	Position on table	Incoming manager	Date of appointment
Sydney FC	(Australia) James Slaveski (caretaker)	Promoted to full time role	N/A	Pre-season	(Australia) James Slaveski	14 May 2026
Central Coast Mariners	(Australia) Kory Babington	End of contract	23 June 2026	Pre-season	(Australia) Dean Heffernan	21 August 2026
Brisbane Roar	(United States) Alex Smith	Signed by Brooklyn FC	7 July 2026	Pre-season	(Australia) Johnathan Clemente	5 August 2026

=== Foreign players ===
Club	Visa 1	Visa 2	Visa 3	Visa 4	Visa 5	Non-Visa foreigner(s)	Former player(s)
Adelaide United	(Jamaica) Tianna Harris	(United States) Tessa Salvestrin	(United States) Bella Yakel			(New Zealand) Claudia Jenkins^{A}	
Brisbane Roar	(Philippines) Katrina Guillou	(Philippines) Hali Long	(United States) Murphy Agnew	(United States) Abby Smothers	(United States) Josie Studer		
Canberra United	(Austria) Naïla Schoefberger	(Japan) Nanako Sasaki	(New Zealand) Elizabeth Anton	(New Zealand) Kelli Brown	(Philippines) Madison Ayson		
Central Coast Mariners	(New Zealand) Rebecca Lake	(New Zealand) Charlotte Lancaster	(New Zealand) Te Reremoana Walker	(Switzerland) Lorena Baumann	(United States) Morgan Witz		
Melbourne City	(England) Danielle Turner	(Japan) Momo Hayashi	(Spain) Malena Mieres	(United States) Kelli McGroarty		(New Zealand) Deven Jackson^{B}	
Melbourne Victory	(New Zealand) Claudia Bunge	(New Zealand) Zoe McMeeken	(Philippines) Skye Leach	(Switzerland) Anna Sutter		(Philippines) Angela Beard^{A} (United States) Kayla Morrison^{B}	
Newcastle Jets	(United States) Erin Flurey	(United States) Claire Henninger	(United States) Alex Klos	(United States) Allie Thornton	(United States) Cameron Valladares		
Perth Glory	(New Zealand) Maggie Jenkins	(Nigeria) Onyinyechi Zogg	(Philippines) Emma Tovar	(United States) Rola Badawiya	(Wales) Megan Wynne		
Sydney FC	(Panama) Riley Cohn	(United States) Kiley Dulaney	(United States) Kenzie Roling	(United States) Faith Webber		(Croatia) Bianca Galic^{A}	
Wellington Phoenix	(England) Brooke Nunn	(Nepal) Sabitra Bhandari	(United States) Kam Pickett	(United States) Ellie Walker	(United States) Makala Woods		
Western Sydney Wanderers	(Colombia) Elexa Bahr	(Germany) Samantha Iredale	(Norway) Silje Bjørneboe	(Philippines) Carleigh Frilles	(United States) Brooke Miller	(Lebanon) Tiana Jaber^{A} (New Zealand) Brianna Edwards^{A}	

The following do not fill a Visa position:
- ^{A} Australian citizens who have last represented other countries at international level
- ^{B} Those players who were born and started their professional career abroad but have since gained Australian citizenship

== Regular season ==
=== League table ===
Pos	Team	Pld	W	D	L	GF	GA	GD	Pts	Qualification
1	Perth Glory	6	3	2	1	4	1	+3	11	Qualification for AFC Women's Champions League and Finals series
2	Central Coast Mariners	5	3	1	1	12	5	+7	10	Qualification for Finals series
3	Wellington Phoenix (Note: Wellington Phoenix cannot qualify for the AFC Women's Champions League as they are based in New Zealand, which is part of the Oceania Football Confederation.)	6	3	1	2	9	6	+3	10	Qualification for Finals series
4	Melbourne Victory	6	2	3	1	4	4	0	9	Qualification for Finals series
5	Melbourne City	3	2	1	0	8	2	+6	7	Qualification for Finals series
6	Sydney FC	5	2	1	2	7	11	−4	7	Qualification for Finals series
7	Western Sydney Wanderers	4	2	0	2	5	4	+1	6	
8	Canberra United	5	2	0	3	4	10	−6	6	
9	Brisbane Roar	5	1	0	4	5	9	−4	3	
10	Adelaide United	5	0	3	2	3	7	−4	3	
11	Newcastle Jets	4	0	2	2	2	4	−2	2	

Updated to match(es) played on 22 November 2026. Source: A-Leagues
Rules for classification: 1) points; 2) goal difference; 3) goals scored; 4) wins; 5) head-to-head results; 5a) head-to-head points; 5b) head-to-head goal difference; 6) Fair Play points; 7) away goal difference; 8) away goals per match; 9) home goal difference; 10) home goals per match; 11) toss of a coin in an event of a tie of two clubs.

=== Results ===
Home \ Away	ADL	BRI	CAN	CCM	MCY	MVC	NEW	PER	SYD	WEL	WSW
Adelaide United		27 Mar	9 Jan	27 Dec	29 Jan	6 Feb	2 Apr	0–0	11 Dec	0–2	13 Mar
Brisbane Roar	17 Jan		6 Feb	2–4	21 Nov	2–0	10 Apr	30 Dec	0–1	19 Mar	20 Feb
Canberra United	20 Mar	1–0		31 Jan	3 Apr	2 Jan	19 Dec	10 Apr	13 Feb	12 Dec	0–2
Central Coast Mariners	2–0	13 Dec	5–1		31 Dec	27 Mar	1–1	0–1	12 Mar	3 Apr	23 Jan
Melbourne City	11 Apr	13 Mar	16 Jan	21 Mar		19 Dec	1–1	7 Feb	27 Dec	24 Jan	6 Jan
Melbourne Victory	1–1	30 Jan	14 Mar	15 Jan	21 Feb		1–0	0–0	10 Apr	29 Dec	9 Jan
Newcastle Jets	TBA	24 Jan	20 Feb	7 Feb	10 Jan	14 Feb		0–1	20 Mar	1 Jan	28 Mar
Perth Glory	23 Jan	13 Feb	0–1	21 Feb	12 Dec	4 Apr	30 Jan		10 Jan	2–0	19 Dec
Sydney FC	2–2	2 Jan	3–1	20 Dec	0–5	23 Jan	16 Jan	27 Mar		20 Feb	4 Apr
Wellington Phoenix	14 Feb	20 Dec	28 Mar	9 Jan	1–2	1–1	14 Mar	16 Jan	3–1		6 Feb
Western Sydney Wanderers	2 Jan	3–1	28 Dec	11 Apr	13 Feb	0–1	11 Dec	20 Mar	30 Jan	0–2	

Updated to match(es) played on 22 November 2026. Source: A-Leagues
Legend: Blue = home team win; Yellow = draw; Red = away team win.

== Regular season statistics ==
=== Top scorers ===
As of 20 November

Rank	Player	Club	Goals
1	(Australia) Talia Kapetanellis	Central Coast Mariners	5
2	(Australia) Skye Halmarick	Central Coast Mariners	3
2	(United States) Makala Woods	Wellington Phoenix	3
4	(Australia) Melina Ayres	Melbourne City	2
4	(United States) Rola Badawiya	Perth Glory	2
4	(New Zealand) Milly Clegg	Wellington Phoenix	2
4	(Australia) Sienna Dale	Canberra United	2
4	(Japan) Momo Hayashi	Melbourne City	2
4	(New Zealand) Indiah-Paige Riley	Wellington Phoenix	2
4	(Australia) Cortnee Vine	Melbourne City	2

=== Clean sheets ===
As of 22 November 2026

Rank	Goalkeeper	Club	Clean sheets
1	(Australia) Alyssa Dall'Oste	Perth Glory	5
2	(Australia) Courtney Newbon	Melbourne Victory	2
3	multiple		1

== See also ==
- 2026–27 A-League Men
- 2027 A-League Women Grand Final
- A-League Women transfers for 2026–27 season
- 2026–27 Adelaide United FC (women) season
- 2026–27 Brisbane Roar FC (women) season
- 2026–27 Canberra United FC (women) season
- 2026–27 Central Coast Mariners FC (women) season
- 2026–27 Melbourne City FC (women) season
- 2026–27 Melbourne Victory FC (women) season
- 2026–27 Newcastle Jets FC (women) season
- 2026–27 Perth Glory FC (women) season
- 2026–27 Sydney FC (women) season
- 2026–27 Wellington Phoenix FC (women) season
- 2026–27 Western Sydney Wanderers FC (women) season
