= 2026–27 Central Coast Mariners FC (women) season =

Central Coast Mariners (women)
2026–27 season
- Chairman: Richard Peil
- Head Coach: Dean Heffernan
- Stadium: polytec Stadium
- A-League Women: TBD
- Top goalscorer: Talia Kapetanellis (5 goals)
Home colours	Away colours	Third colours
- All statistics correct as of 29 July 2026.

The 2026–27 season is the Central Coast Mariners Football Club (women)'s sixth season in the A-League Women.

== Players ==
Note: Flags indicate national team as defined under FIFA eligibility rules; some limited exceptions apply. Players may hold more than one non-FIFA nationality.

No.	Pos.	Nation	Player
1	GK	AUS	Morgan Aquino
2	DF	NZL	Rebecca Lake
3	DF	AUS	Liz Barwick-Grey
4	DF	AUS	Alexia Karrys-Stahl
5	MF	NZL	Charlotte Lancaster
6	MF	NZL	Te Reremoana Walker
7	FW	USA	Morgan Witz
8	FW	AUS	Talia Kapetanellis
9	FW	AUS	Skye Halmarick
11	DF	AUS	Danika Matos
12	MF	AUS	Tiana Fuller

No.	Pos.	Nation	Player
13	DF	AUS	Kaiya Buchanan
14	MF	AUS	Greta Kraszula
15	GK	AUS	Annalee Grove
16	MF	AUS	Tess Quilligan
17	FW	AUS	Kiara De Domizio
18	DF	AUS	Taren King (captain)
19	FW	AUS	Fiorina Iaria
21	FW	AUS	Eliza Familton
22	FW	AUS	Peta Trimis
23	DF	SUI	Lorena Baumann
30	GK	AUS	Sophia Varley

== Transfers ==
=== Transfers in ===
No.	Position	Player	From	Type/fee	Contract length	Date	Ref
9	FW	Skye Halmarick	Unattached	Free transfer	1 year	12 September 2026	
11	DF	Danika Matos	Unattached	Free transfer	1 year	14 September 2026	
1	GK	Morgan Aquino	Unattached	Free transfer	1 year	19 September 2026	
8	FW	Talia Kapetanellis	(Australia) APIA Leichhardt	Free transfer	1 year	20 September 2026	
6	MF	(New Zealand) Te Reremoana Walker	(Australia) APIA Leichhardt	Free transfer	1 year	20 September 2026	
5	MF	(New Zealand) Charlotte Lancaster	(Australia) APIA Leichhardt	Free transfer	1 year	21 September 2026	
17	FW	Kiara De Domizio	Canberra United	Free transfer	1 year	26 September 2026	
4	DF	Alexia Karrys-Stahl	Unattached	Free transfer	1 year	26 September 2026	
2	DF	(New Zealand) Rebecca Lake	(Vietnam) Thái Nguyên T&T	Free transfer	1 year	26 September 2026	
19	FW	Fiorina Iaria	Melbourne Victory	Free transfer	1 year	13 October 2026	
7	FW	(United States) Morgan Witz	Unattached	Free transfer	1 year	15 October 2026	

=== Transfers out ===
No.	Position	Player	Transferred to	Type/fee	Date	Ref
25	DF	(United States) Blake Hughes	(United States) Texas A&M Aggies	End of contract	17 March 2026	
6	MF	Isabel Gomez	(Sweden) Rosengård	End of contract	23 June 2026	
9	FW	(England) Millie Farrow	(Turkey) Trabzonspor	End of contract	23 July 2026	
7	MF	Avaani Prakash	Melbourne City	End of contract	19 August 2026	
1	GK	Sarah Langman	Western Sydney Wanderers	End of contract	22 August 2026	
5	DF	Annabel Martin	Brisbane Roar	End of contract	1 September 2026	
4	DF	Baxter Thew	Perth Glory	End of contract	4 September 2026	
10	MF	Tamar Levin	Newcastle Jets	End of contract	28 September 2026	
8	MF	Maya Fernandez	Unattached	End of contract	16 October 2026	
17	MF	Jynaya dos Santos	Unattached	End of contract	16 October 2026	
19	MF	Jaya Bowman	Unattached	End of contract	16 October 2026	
20	GK	Baylee Broomhead	Unattached	End of contract	16 October 2026	
26	MF	Isabella Coco-Di Sipio	Unattached	End of contract	16 October 2026	
77	DF	(United States) Cannon Clough	Unattached	End of contract	16 October 2026	

=== Contract extensions ===
No.	Player	Position	Duration	Date	Ref.
22	Peta Trimis	Forward	1 year	28 August 2026	
14	Greta Kraszula	Midfielder	1 year	31 August 2026	
23	(Switzerland) Lorena Baumann	Defender	1 year	2 September 2026	
12	Tiana Fuller	Midfielder	1 year	2 September 2026	
21	Eliza Familton	Forward	1 year	3 September 2026	
18	Taren King	Defender	1 year	3 September 2026	
3	Liz Barwick-Grey	Defender	1 year	3 September 2026	
13	Kaiya Buchanan	Defender	1 year	9 September 2026	
15	Annalee Grove	Goalkeeper	1 year	9 September 2026	
16	Tess Quilligan	Midfielder	1 year	9 September 2026	
30	Sophia Varley	Goalkeeper	1 year	11 October 2026	

== Pre-season and friendlies ==
26 September 2026	Central Coast Football Select (Australia)	0–7	(Australia) Central Coast Mariners	Lisarow, Australia
15:00 AEST		Report	Halmarick 2', 14', 16', 30'; Lancaster 17'; Lake 48'; Fuller 63'	Stadium: Pluim Park

3 October 2026	Central Coast Mariners (Australia)	3–0	(Australia) Newcastle Jets	Gosford, Australia
	Halmarick; Kapetanellis; De Domizio	Report		Stadium: Central Coast Stadium; Attendance: 0 (behind closed doors)

10 October 2026	Central Coast Mariners (Australia)	2–0	(Australia) Sydney FC	Australia
	Trimis	Report		Attendance: 0 (behind closed doors)

== Competitions ==
=== Overall record ===
Competition	First match	Last match	Record							
Competition	First match	Last match	Pld	W	D	L	GF	GA	GD	Win %
A-League Women	12 October 2026	TBD	4	3	1	0	12	4	+8	75.00
Total			4	3	1	0	12	4	+8	75.00

Last updated: 7 November 2026
Source: Competitions

=== A-League Women ===
==== League table ====
Pos	Team	Pld	W	D	L	GF	GA	GD	Pts	Qualification
1	Central Coast Mariners	5	3	1	1	12	5	+7	10	Qualification for AFC Women's Champions League and Finals series
2	Perth Glory	5	3	1	1	4	1	+3	10	Qualification for Finals series
3	Melbourne Victory	5	2	2	1	4	4	0	8	Qualification for Finals series
4	Melbourne City	3	2	1	0	8	2	+6	7	Qualification for Finals series
5	Wellington Phoenix (Note: Wellington Phoenix cannot qualify for the AFC Women's Champions League as they are based in New Zealand, which is part of the Oceania Football Confederation.)	5	2	1	2	7	6	+1	7	Qualification for Finals series

Updated to match(es) played on 15 November 2026. Source: A-Leagues
Rules for classification: 1) points; 2) goal difference; 3) goals scored; 4) wins; 5) head-to-head results; 5a) head-to-head points; 5b) head-to-head goal difference; 6) Fair Play points; 7) away goal difference; 8) away goals per match; 9) home goal difference; 10) home goals per match; 11) toss of a coin in an event of a tie of two clubs.

==== Results summary ====
Overall								Home						Away					
Pld	W	D	L	GF	GA	GD	Pts	W	D	L	GF	GA	GD	W	D	L	GF	GA	GD
5	3	1	1	12	3	+9	10	2	1	1	8	1	+7	1	0	0	4	2	+2

Last updated: 14 November 2026.
Source: A-Leagues

==== Results by round ====
Round	1	2	3	4	5	6	7	8	9	10	11	12	13	14	15	16	17	18	19	20	21	22
Ground	A	H	H	H	H	B	H	A	A	H	A	A	H	A	A	B	A	H	A	H	H	A
Result	W	W	W	D	L	B										B						
Position	1	1	1	1	1																	
Points	3	6	9	10	10																	

Updated to match(es) played on 14 November 2026. Source: A-Leagues
A = Away; H = Home; B = Bye; W = Win; D = Draw; L = Loss; P = Postponed

==== Matches ====
The league fixtures were released on 21 August 2026.

Win Draw Loss Fixtures

17 October 2026 1	Brisbane Roar	2–4	Central Coast Mariners	Brisbane
16:00 AEST	Brown 26'; Guillou 77'	Report	Trimis 7'; Kapetanellis 44'; Halmarick 59'; Witz 75'	Stadium: Spencer Park; Attendance: 1,018; Referee: Isabella Mossin

24 October 2026 2	Central Coast Mariners	5–1	Canberra United	Gosford
15:00 AEDT	Halmarick 6'; Kapetanellis 31', 70'; Walker 55'; Karrys-Stahl 80'	Report	Dale 87'	Stadium: polytec Stadium; Referee: Charlotte Flynn

31 October 2026 3	Central Coast Mariners	2–0	Adelaide United	Gosford
17:00 AEDT	Kapetanellis 10', 53'	Report		Stadium: polytec Stadium

7 November 2026 4	Central Coast Mariners	1–1	Newcastle Jets	Gosford
15:00 AEDT	Halmarick 5'	Report	Levin 71'	Stadium: polytec Stadium

14 November 2026 5	Central Coast Mariners	0–1	Perth Glory	Gosford
17:00 AEDT		Report	Jenkins 78'	Stadium: polytec Stadium

13 December 2026 7	Central Coast Mariners	v	Brisbane Roar	Gosford
17:00 AEDT				Stadium: polytec Stadium

20 December 2026 8	Sydney FC	v	Central Coast Mariners	Wollongong
17:00 AEDT		Report		Stadium: WIN Stadium

27 December 2026 9	Adelaide United	v	Central Coast Mariners	Adelaide
16:20 ACDT				Stadium: Coopers Stadium

31 December 2026 10	Central Coast Mariners	v	Melbourne City	Gosford
16:50 AEDT		Report		Stadium: Polytec Stadium

9 January 2027 11	Wellington Phoenix	v	Central Coast Mariners	Porirua
17:00 NZDT				Stadium: Jerry Collins Stadium

15 January 2027 12	Melbourne Victory	v	Central Coast Mariners	Melbourne
16:50 AEDT		Report		Stadium: AAMI Stadium

23 January 2027 13	Central Coast Mariners	v	Western Sydney Wanderers	Gosford
17:00 AEDT				Stadium: Polytec Stadium

31 January 2027 14	Canberra United	v	Central Coast Mariners	Canberra
15:00 AEDT				Stadium: McKellar Park

7 February 2027 15	Newcastle Jets	v	Central Coast Mariners	Weston
15:00 AEDT		Report		Stadium: Hunter City Motor Group Stadium

21 February 2027 17	Perth Glory	v	Central Coast Mariners	Perth
17:00 AWST		Report		Stadium: Sam Kerr Football Centre

12 March 2027 18	Central Coast Mariners	v	Sydney FC	Gosford
19:00 AEDT		Report		Stadium: Polytec Stadium

21 March 2027 19	Melbourne City	v	Central Coast Mariners	Melbourne
19:45 AEDT		Report		Stadium: AAMI Park

27 March 2027 20	Central Coast Mariners	v	Melbourne Victory	Gosford
15:00 AEDT		Report		Stadium: Polytec Stadium

3 April 2027 21	Central Coast Mariners	v	Wellington Phoenix	Gosford
15:00 AEDT				Stadium: polytec Stadium

11 April 2027 22	Western Sydney Wanderers	v	Central Coast Mariners	Sydney
12:15 AEST				Stadium: TBC

== Statistics ==
=== Appearances and goals ===
Players with no appearances are not included in the list.

As of match played 7 November 2026

No.	Pos	Nat	Player	Total		A-League Women	
No.	Pos	Nat	Player	Apps	Goals	Apps	Goals
1	GK	(Australia) AUS	Morgan Aquino	4	0	4	0
2	DF	(New Zealand) NZL	Rebecca Lake	4	0	4	0
3	DF	(Australia) AUS	Liz Barwick-Grey	1	0	0+1	0
4	DF	(Australia) AUS	Alexia Karrys-Stahl	4	1	0+4	1
5	MF	(New Zealand) NZL	Charlotte Lancaster	2	0	1+1	0
6	MF	(New Zealand) NZL	Te Reremoana Walker	4	1	3+1	1
7	FW	(United States) USA	Morgan Witz	4	1	0+4	1
8	FW	(Australia) AUS	Talia Kapetanellis	4	5	4	5
9	FW	(Australia) AUS	Skye Halmarick	4	3	4	3
11	DF	(Australia) AUS	Danika Matos	4	0	4	0
12	FW	(Australia) AUS	Tiana Fuller	2	0	0+2	0
13	DF	(Australia) AUS	Kaiya Buchanan	4	0	3+1	0
14	MF	(Australia) AUS	Greta Kraszula	4	0	4	0
16	MF	(Australia) AUS	Tess Quilligan	2	0	1+1	0
17	FW	(Australia) AUS	Kiara De Domizio	2	0	0+2	0
18	DF	(Australia) AUS	Taren King	4	0	4	0
21	FW	(Australia) AUS	Eliza Familton	4	0	4	0
22	FW	(Australia) AUS	Peta Trimis	4	1	4	1

- Source: Soccerway

== See also ==
- 2026–27 Central Coast Mariners FC season
