= 2026–27 Adelaide United FC season =

23rd season in the existence of Adelaide United FC

Adelaide United
2026–27 season
- Adelaide United playing at home against Tai Po in the AFC Champions League Two, 17 September 2026
- Manager: Airton Andrioli
- Stadium: Coopers Stadium
- A-League Men: 12th
- Australia Cup: Round of 32
- Champions League Elite: Preliminary round
- Champions League Two: Group stage
- Top goalscorer: League: Brody Burkitt (2); All: Craig Goodwin (4)
- Highest home attendance: 13,541 vs. Melbourne Victory; 8 November 2026; A-League Men
- Lowest home attendance: 3,417 vs. Tai Po; 17 September 2026; AFC Champions League Two
- Average home league attendance: 13,541
- Biggest win: 3–0 vs. Tai Po (H); 17 September 2026; AFC Champions League Two
- Biggest defeat: 0–5 vs. Lion City Sailors (A); 5 November 2026; A-League Men
- All statistics correct as of 22 November 2026.

The 2026–27 season is the 23rd in the history of Adelaide United Football Club since its establishment in 2003. The club will participate in the A-League Men for the 22nd consecutive season. The club also made its 12th appearance in the Australia Cup, seventh appearance in the AFC Champions League Elite, and is making its first appearance in the AFC Champions League Two.

== Coaching staff ==
Position	Name
Head coach	(Brazil) Airton Andrioli
Assistant coaches	(Spain) Isaías; (Australia) Adrian Stenta; (Australia) Paul Vanis
Goalkeeping coach	(Australia) Eugene Galekovic
Transition and individual coach	(Spain) Javi López
Strength and conditioning coach	(Australia) Sean Baker
Performance coach	(Australia) Blake Ashby
Head physiotherapist	(Australia) Marco Mittiga
Physiotherapist	(Australia) Steven Chapman
Doctor	(Australia) James Ilic
Video analyst	(Australia) Daniel Quinn

== Players ==
=== Squad ===
Note: Flags indicate national team as defined under FIFA eligibility rules; some limited exceptions apply. Players may hold more than one non-FIFA nationality.

No.	Pos.	Nation	Player
3	DF	NED	Bart Vriends (vice-captain)
4	DF	AUS	Panagiotis Kikianis
7	DF	AUS	Ryan Kitto
10	MF	ESP	Juan Muñiz
11	FW	AUS	Craig Goodwin (captain)
12	MF	AUS	Jonny Yull
13	GK	AUS	Max Vartuli
14	MF	AUS	Jay Barnett
15	DF	AUS	Israel Monga (scholarship)
17	FW	AUS	Ben Folami
18	FW	AUS	Jake Najdovski
19	FW	AUS	Amlani Tatu (scholarship)
20	DF	AUS	Dylan Pierias
21	FW	AUS	Jacob Brazete
22	GK	NED	Joshua Smits
23	MF	AUS	Luke Duzel

No.	Pos.	Nation	Player
27	FW	AUS	Mitchell Smith (scholarship)
35	FW	AUS	Brody Burkitt
40	GK	AUS	Ethan Cox
44	MF	AUS	Ryan White
52	DF	AUS	Sotiri Phillis (scholarship)
55	MF	AUS	Ethan Alagich
58	FW	AUS	Harry Crawford
62	MF	AUS	Fabian Talladira (scholarship)
65	MF	AUS	Joey Garuccio (scholarship)
71	DF	AUS	Vinko Stanisic (scholarship)
78	DF	AUS	Malual Nichola (scholarship)
79	DF	AUS	Feyzo Kasumović (scholarship)
87	MF	BRA	Anselmo
88	DF	AUS	Denver Minster (scholarship)
99	FW	SSD	Ajak Riak

=== Out on loan ===
Note: Flags indicate national team as defined under FIFA eligibility rules; some limited exceptions apply. Players may hold more than one non-FIFA nationality.

No.	Pos.	Nation	Player
78	DF	AUS	Malual Nichola (on loan at Adelaide City until 31 December 2026)

== Transfers and contracts ==
=== Transfers in ===
No.	Position	Player	From	Type/fee	Contract length	Date	Ref
6	MF	Stefan Mauk	(Vietnam) Công An Hà Nội	End of loan	1 year remaining	30 June 2026	
21	FW	Jacob Brazete	Unattached	Free transfer	3 years (Note: Option for an additional year.)	20 July 2026	
88	DF	Denver Minster	(Australia) Gold Coast United	Free transfer	3 years (Note: Scholarship contract.)	3 September 2026	
27	FW	Mitchell Smith	(Spain) Real Zaragoza	Free transfer	3 years	3 September 2026	

=== Transfers out ===
No.	Pos.	Player	Transferred to	Type/fee	Date	Ref
54	DF	Bailey O'Neil	(Australia) Adelaide City	End of contract	25 June 2026	
42	MF	(Lebanon) Austin Ayoubi	Unattached	End of contract	30 June 2026	
36	DF	Panashe Madanha	Western Sydney Wanderers	End of contract	30 June 2026	
6	MF	Stefan Mauk	(Vietnam) Công An Hà Nội	Undisclosed	1 July 2026	
19	FW	Yaya Dukuly	(Slovenia) Celje	Undisclosed	10 July 2026	
9	FW	Luka Jovanovic	(United States) San Jose Earthquakes	Undisclosed	17 July 2026	
78	DF	Malual Nichola	(Australia) Adelaide City	Loan	30 September 2026	

== Pre-season and friendlies ==
14 July 2026	The Cove (Australia)	0–5	(Australia) Adelaide United	Adelaide
18:30 ACST		Report	Kikianis; Kitto; Duzel; Muñiz; Blažević	Stadium: Southern Soccer Facility

20 July 2026	Playford City (Australia)	0–2	(Australia) Adelaide United	Adelaide
18:30 ACST		Report	Yull; Muñiz	Stadium: Ramsay Park

27 September 2026	Perth Glory (Australia)	2–0	(Australia) Adelaide United	Bunbury
12:00 AWST	Despotovski 46'; Scicluna 54'	Report		Stadium: Hay Park; Attendance: 1,136; Referee: Finn Johnson

3 October 2026	Perth Glory (Australia)	1–3	(Australia) Adelaide United	Northam
14:00 AWST	Kuzamba 63'	Report	Crawford 3'; Burkitt 53'; Riak 64'	Stadium: Henry Street Oval; Attendance: 1,008; Referee: Finn Johnson

8 October 2026	Adelaide City (Australia)	2–5	(Australia) Adelaide United	Adelaide
19:00 ACDT	Bressan; Schimizzi	Report	Muñiz; Riak; Kasumović; Burkitt; Goodwin (pen.)	Stadium: Adelaide City Park

== Competitions ==
=== Overall record ===
Competition	First match	Last match	Starting round	Final position	Record							
Competition	First match	Last match	Starting round	Final position	Pld	W	D	L	GF	GA	GD	Win %
A-League Men	25 October 2026	7 May 2027	Matchweek 2	TBD	4	0	1	3	5	12	−7	0.00
Australia Cup	30 July 2026	30 July 2026	Round of 32	Round of 32	1	0	0	1	1	2	−1	0.00
AFC Champions League Elite	11 August 2026	11 August 2026	Preliminary round	Preliminary round	1	0	0	1	0	2	−2	0.00
AFC Champions League Two	17 September 2026	TBD	Group stage	TBD	4	2	0	2	5	7	−2	50.00
Total					10	2	1	7	11	23	−12	20.00

Source: Soccerway

=== A-League Men ===
==== League table ====
Pos	Team	Pld	W	D	L	GF	GA	GD	Pts
8	Auckland FC (Note: Auckland FC and Wellington Phoenix cannot qualify for Asian Football Confederation competitions as they are based in New Zealand, which is part of the Oceania Football Confederation.)	5	1	3	1	7	8	−1	6
9	Melbourne Victory	5	0	4	1	6	7	−1	4
10	Central Coast Mariners	5	0	3	2	4	9	−5	3
11	Newcastle Jets	4	0	2	2	4	8	−4	2
12	Adelaide United	4	0	1	3	5	12	−7	1

Updated to match(es) played on 22 November 2026. Source: A-Leagues
Rules for classification: 1) points; 2) goal difference; 3) goals scored; 4) wins; 5) head-to-head results; 5a) head-to-head points; 5b) head-to-head goal difference; 6) Fair Play points; 7) away goal difference; 8) away goals per match; 9) home goal difference; 10) home goals per match; 11) toss of a coin in an event of a tie of two clubs.

==== Results summary ====
Overall								Home						Away					
Pld	W	D	L	GF	GA	GD	Pts	W	D	L	GF	GA	GD	W	D	L	GF	GA	GD
4	0	1	3	5	12	−7	1	0	1	0	2	2	0	0	0	3	3	10	−7

Last updated: 22 November 2026.
Source: Ultimate A-League

==== Results by round ====
Round	2	3	4	5	6	7	8	1	9	10	11	12	13	14	15	16	17	18	19	20	21	22	23	24	25	26	27	28
Ground	A	A	H	A	A	✖	H	H	H	H	A	H	H	A	H	H	✖	A	A	H	A	A	H	A	A	H	H	A
Result	L	L	D	L		B											B											
Position	11	12	12	12																								
Points	0	0	1	1																								

Updated to match(es) played on 22 November 2026. Source: Ultimate A-League
A = Away; H = Home; W = Win; D = Draw; L = Loss; b = Bye

==== Matches ====
Win Draw Loss Fixtures

25 October 2026 2	Sydney FC	2–1	Adelaide United	Sydney
15:00 AEDT	Youlley 64'; Sunday 73'	Report	Burkitt 16'	Stadium: Allianz Stadium; Attendance: 10,733; Referee: Tim Danaskos

1 November 2026 3	Perth Glory	4–0	Adelaide United	Perth
16:00 AWST	Kucharski 16'; Kuzamba 20'; Colakovski 33'; Ellis 85'	Report		Stadium: HBF Park; Attendance: 7,670; Referee: Tom Dale

8 November 2026 4	Adelaide United	2–2	Melbourne Victory	Adelaide
16:30 ACDT	Burkitt 45+3'; Garuccio 90+9'	Report	Valadon 64'; Jelacic 70'	Stadium: Coopers Stadium; Attendance: 13,541; Referee: Daniel Elder

20 November 2026 5	Western Sydney Wanderers	4–2	Adelaide United	Sydney
19:40 AEDT	Borrello 47', 57' (pen.); Gillion 88', 90+3'	Report	Barnett 43'; Goodwin 53'	Stadium: CommBank Stadium; Attendance: 7,082; Referee: Alex King

6 December 2026 6	Wellington Phoenix	v	Adelaide United	Wellington
15:00 NZDT		Source		Stadium: Hnry Stadium
Note: Originally scheduled for 29 November 2026.

11 December 2026 8	Adelaide United	v	Macarthur FC	Adelaide
19:10 ACDT		Source		Stadium: Coopers Stadium

15 December 2026 1	Adelaide United	v	Brisbane Roar	Adelaide
19:10 ACDT		Source		Stadium: Coopers Stadium
Note: Originally scheduled for 18 October 2026.

20 December 2026 9	Adelaide United	v	Newcastle Jets	Adelaide
16:30 ACDT		Source		Stadium: Coopers Stadium

27 December 2026 10	Adelaide United	v	Central Coast Mariners	Adelaide
19:30 ACDT		Source		Stadium: Coopers Stadium

1 January 2027 11	Auckland FC	v	Adelaide United	Auckland
15:00 NZDT		Source		Stadium: Go Media Stadium

9 January 2027 12	Adelaide United	v	Sydney FC	Adelaide
19:10 ACDT		Source		Stadium: Coopers Stadium

17 January 2027 13	Adelaide United	v	Western Sydney Wanderers	Adelaide
16:30 ACDT		Source		Stadium: Coopers Stadium

25 January 2027 14	Macarthur FC	v	Adelaide United	Sydney
19:00 AEDT		Source		Stadium: Campbelltown Sports Stadium

29 January 2027 15	Adelaide United	v	Melbourne City	Adelaide
19:10 ACDT		Source		Stadium: Coopers Stadium

6 February 2027 16	Adelaide United	v	Melbourne Victory	Adelaide
19:10 ACDT		Source		Stadium: Coopers Stadium

21 February 2027 18	Newcastle Jets	v	Adelaide United	Newcastle
17:00 AEDT		Source		Stadium: McDonald Jones Stadium

28 February 2027 19	Central Coast Mariners	v	Adelaide United	Gosford
15:00 AEDT		Source		Stadium: Polytec Stadium

5 March 2027 20	Adelaide United	v	Perth Glory	Adelaide
19:10 ACDT		Source		Stadium: Coopers Stadium

14 March 2027 21	Brisbane Roar	v	Adelaide United	Brisbane
16:00 AEST		Source		Stadium: Suncorp Stadium

21 March 2027 22	Melbourne City	v	Adelaide United	Melbourne
15:00 AEDT		Source		Stadium: AAMI Park

2 April 2027 23	Adelaide United	v	Wellington Phoenix	Adelaide
19:10 ACDT		Source		Stadium: Coopers Stadium

10 April 2027 24	Newcastle Jets	v	Adelaide United	Newcastle
17:00 AEST		Source		Stadium: McDonald Jones Stadium

17 April 2027 25	Melbourne Victory	v	Adelaide United	Melbourne
19:40 AEST		Source		Stadium: AAMI Park

24 April 2027 26	Adelaide United	v	Brisbane Roar	Adelaide
19:10 ACST		Source		Stadium: Coopers Stadium

1 May 2027 27	Adelaide United	v	Auckland FC	Adelaide
16:30 ACST		Source		Stadium: Coopers Stadium

7 May 2027 28	Perth Glory	v	Adelaide United	Perth
19:45 AWST		Source		Stadium: HBF Park

=== Australia Cup ===
30 July 2026 Round of 32	South Melbourne	2–1	Adelaide United	Melbourne
19:30 AEST	Juach 33'; Uchida 68'	Report	Goodwin 3'	Stadium: Lakeside Stadium; Attendance: 3,080; Referee: Declan Woods

=== AFC Champions League Elite ===
==== Preliminary round ====
11 August 2026 Preliminary round	Adelaide United (Australia)	0–2	(Vietnam) Công An Hà Nội	Adelaide
19:00 ACST		Report	Henen 41'; Perea 64'	Stadium: Hindmarsh Stadium; Attendance: 6,451; Referee: Asker Nazhafaliev (Uzbekistan)

=== AFC Champions League Two ===
==== Group stage ====
Pos	Team	Pld	W	D	L	GF	GA	GD	Pts	Qualification	LCS	BGP	ADE	TPF
1	(Singapore) Lion City Sailors	4	3	1	0	9	1	+8	10	Advance to round of 16	—	1–1	5–0	–
2	(Thailand) BG Pathum United	4	2	1	1	9	4	+5	7	Advance to round of 16	–	—	1–2	4–1
3	(Australia) Adelaide United	4	2	0	2	5	8	−3	6		0–2	–	—	3–0
4	(Hong Kong) Tai Po (E)	4	0	0	4	1	11	−10	0		0–1	0–3	–	—

Updated to match(es) played on 5 November 2026. Source: ACL2
Rules for classification: Tiebreakers
(E) Eliminated

17 September 2026 1	Adelaide United (Australia)	3–0	(Hong Kong) Tai Po	Adelaide, Australia
19:30 ACST	Alagich 19'; Muñiz 48'; Goodwin 75'	Report		Stadium: Hindmarsh Stadium; Attendance: 3,417; Referee: Ammar Mahfoodh (Bahrain)

15 October 2026 2	BG Pathum United (Thailand)	1–2	(Australia) Adelaide United	Pathum Thani, Thailand
19:15 UTC+7	Jurina 2'	Report	Goodwin 10'; Alagich 77'	Stadium: Pathum Thani Stadium; Attendance: 4,317; Referee: Mohammed Al-Shammari (Qatar)

29 October 2026 3	Adelaide United (Australia)	0–2	(Singapore) Lion City Sailors	Adelaide, Australia
18:15 ACDT		Report	Gomes 80'; Thy 90+3'	Stadium: Hindmarsh Stadium; Attendance: 3,762; Referee: Clifford Daypuyat (Philippines)

5 November 2026 4	Lion City Sailors (Singapore)	5–0	(Australia) Adelaide United	Kallang, Singapore
19:30 UTC+8	Phaëton 8', 75'; Wright 17'; Nakamura 41'; Fandi 71'	Report		Stadium: Jalan Besar Stadium; Attendance: 1,847; Referee: Sanzhar Zhakypbekov (Kyrgyzstan)

25 November 2026 5	Tai Po (Hong Kong)	v	(Australia) Adelaide United	Mong Kok, Hong Kong
				Stadium: Mong Kok Stadium

3 December 2026 6	Adelaide United (Australia)	v	(Thailand) BG Pathum United	Adelaide, Australia
				Stadium: Hindmarsh Stadium

== Statistics ==
=== Appearances and goals ===
Includes all competitions. Players with no appearances not included in the list.

As of 22 November 2026

No.	Pos.	Nat.	Player	A-League Men		Australia Cup		AFC Champions League Elite		AFC Champions League Two		Total		Ref			
No.	Pos.	Nat.	Player	Apps	Goals	Apps	Goals	Apps	Goals	Apps	Goals	Apps	Goals	Ref			
No.	Pos.	Nat.	Player	3	DF	(Netherlands)	Bart Vriends	0	0	1	0	1	0	0	0	2	0
4	DF	(Australia)	Panagiotis Kikianis	4	0	1	0	1	0	4	0	10	0				
7	DF	(Australia)	Ryan Kitto	2+1	0	0	0	0	0	2	0	5	0				
10	MF	(Spain)	Juan Muñiz	3+1	0	1	0	1	0	4	1	10	1				
11	FW	(Australia)	Craig Goodwin	3	1	1	1	1	0	2+1	2	8	4				
12	MF	(Australia)	Jonny Yull	1+1	0	1	0	1	0	2+2	0	8	0				
14	MF	(Australia)	Jay Barnett	3	1	1	0	1	0	3+1	0	9	1				
17	FW	(Australia)	Ben Folami	0+1	0	0	0	0	0	0+2	0	3	0				
19 (Note: Amlani Tatu made one appearance in the Australia Cup as number 74.)	FW	(Australia)	Amlani Tatu	1+2	0	0+1	0	0	0	1+3	0	8	0				
21	FW	(Australia)	Jacob Brazete	0+1	0	0	0	0+1	0	1	0	3	0				
22	GK	(Netherlands)	Joshua Smits	4	0	1	0	1	0	4	0	10	0				
23	MF	(Australia)	Luke Duzel	2+1	0	1	0	0+1	0	2	0	7	0				
27	FW	(Australia)	Mitchell Smith	2	0	0	0	0	0	0+2	0	4	0				
35	FW	(Australia)	Brody Burkitt	4	2	0+1	0	0+1	0	4	0	10	2				
44	MF	(Australia)	Ryan White	0	0	1	0	1	0	0	0	2	0				
52	DF	(Australia)	Sotiri Phillis	3	0	0	0	0	0	4	0	7	0				
55	MF	(Australia)	Ethan Alagich	4	0	1	0	1	0	4	2	10	2				
58	FW	(Australia)	Harry Crawford	2+2	0	0+1	0	1	0	3	0	9	0				
62	MF	(Australia)	Fabian Talladira	3+1	0	1	0	1	0	1+2	0	9	0				
65	MF	(Australia)	Joey Garuccio	1+3	1	0	0	0	0	0+3	0	7	1				
79	DF	(Australia)	Feyzo Kasumović	1+1	0	0	0	0	0	0+1	0	3	0				
87	MF	(Brazil)	Anselmo	1+3	0	0+1	0	0+1	0	3+1	0	10	0				
99	FW	(South Sudan)	Ajak Riak	0+2	0	0	0	0	0	0+3	0	5	0				
Player(s) transferred out but featured this season

=== Disciplinary record ===
Includes all competitions. The list is sorted by squad number when total cards are equal. Players with no cards not included in the list.

As of 22 November 2026

Rank	No.	Pos.	Nat.	Player	A-League Men			Australia Cup			AFC Champions League Elite			AFC Champions League Two			Total			Ref
Rank	No.	Pos.	Nat.	Player	Yellow card	(yellow card) (yellow-red card)	Red card	Yellow card	(yellow card) (yellow-red card)	Red card	Yellow card	(yellow card) (yellow-red card)	Red card	Yellow card	(yellow card) (yellow-red card)	Red card	Yellow card	(yellow card) (yellow-red card)	Red card	Ref
1	4	DF	(Australia)	Panagiotis Kikianis	1	0	0	0	0	0	1	0	0	1	0	0	3	0	0	
2	10	MF	(Spain)	Juan Muñiz	1	0	0	1	0	0	0	0	0	0	0	0	2	0	0	
2	35	FW	(Australia)	Brody Burkitt	2	0	0	0	0	0	0	0	0	0	0	0	2	0	0	
2	52	DF	(Australia)	Sotiri Phillis	1	0	0	0	0	0	0	0	0	1	0	0	2	0	0	
2	55	MF	(Australia)	Ethan Alagich	0	0	0	1	0	0	0	0	0	1	0	0	2	0	0	
6	11	FW	(Australia)	Craig Goodwin	1	0	0	0	0	0	0	0	0	0	0	0	1	0	0	
6	14	MF	(Australia)	Jay Barnett	0	0	0	0	0	0	0	0	0	1	0	0	1	0	0	
6	58	DF	(Australia)	Harry Crawford	0	0	0	0	0	0	1	0	0	0	0	0	1	0	0	
6	62	DF	(Australia)	Fabian Talladira	1	0	0	0	0	0	0	0	0	0	0	0	1	0	0	
6	87	MF	(Brazil)	Anselmo	0	0	0	0	0	0	0	0	0	1	0	0	1	0	0	
6	99	FW	(South Sudan)	Ajak Riak	0	0	0	0	0	0	0	0	0	1	0	0	1	0	0	
Total					7	0	0	2	0	0	2	0	0	6	0	0	17	0	0	

=== Clean sheets ===
Includes all competitions. The list is sorted by squad number when total clean sheets are equal. Numbers in parentheses represent games where both goalkeepers participated and both kept a clean sheet; the number in parentheses is awarded to the goalkeeper who was substituted on, whilst a full clean sheet is awarded to the goalkeeper who was on the field at the start of play. Goalkeepers with no clean sheets not included in the list.

As of 8 November 2026

Rank	No.	Nat.	Goalkeeper	A-League Men	Australia Cup	AFC Champions League Elite	AFC Champions League Two	Total
1	22	(Netherlands)	Joshua Smits	0	0	0	1	1
Total				0	0	0	1	1

== See also ==
- 2026–27 Adelaide United FC (women) season
