= Scott Muller (cricketer) =

Australian cricketer

Personal information
- Full name: Scott Andrew Muller
- Born: 11 July 1971 (age 55); Herston, Queensland, Australia
- Height: 189 cm (6 ft 2 in)
- Batting: Right-handed
- Bowling: Right-arm fast-medium
- Role: Bowler

International information
- National side: Australia
- Test debut (cap 382): 5 November 1999 v Pakistan
- Last Test: 18 November 1999 v Pakistan

Domestic team information
- Years: Team
- 1990/91–2001/02: Queensland

Career statistics
Competition	Test	FC	LA
Matches	2	30	8
Runs scored	6	210	5
Batting average	–	10.00	5.00
100s/50s	0/0	0/0	0/0
Top score	6*	26	5*
Balls bowled	348	4,839	351
Wickets	7	102	12
Bowling average	36.85	23.50	23.33
5 wickets in innings	0	4	1
10 wickets in match	0	0	0
Best bowling	3/68	5/35	5/43
Catches/stumpings	2/–	12/–	2/–
- Source: CricInfo, 3 June 2021

Scott Andrew Muller (born 11 July 1971) is a former Australian and Queensland cricketer of German ancestry.

== State cricket ==
Muller was a fast-medium bowler for the Queensland Bulls in the Sheffield Shield competition who was a solid performer for his state, with a bowling average of 23. He made his Test cricket debut in 1999.

== Test career ==
Muller played in two Test matches, both against Pakistan in Australia in 1999. He took seven wickets, and Australia won both matches, but he was relatively expensive, conceding nearly 4.5 runs per over and was replaced in the next matches by Michael Kasprowicz.

=== "He can't bowl, and he can't throw" ===
Muller was at the centre of an incident during his second Test match, played in Hobart. Shortly after being informed that he was not required for the following Test, a special effects microphone picked up someone saying "He can't bowl, and can't throw" just after Muller had fielded a ball at fine leg and sent an errant return to wicket keeper Adam Gilchrist, far above his head. Television show The Panel replayed it and the finger was pointed at Shane Warne as the source of the comment. Warne denied it but Muller was unconvinced and threatened legal action. The Australian media ran the story as a hot topic for a few days with much of the general public believing that Warne was guilty despite voice analysis experts' opinions and scrutiny of television footage. A short time later a cameraman from Channel 9, "Joe the Cameraman", confessed on A Current Affair to being the culprit, although many disputed the truth of his confession, including then opposition backbencher Mark Latham, who accused the network of a cover-up.

== Later career ==
Following his short Test career, Muller played just a few more matches for Queensland. He made a return in the 2002/03 season in a List A game but did not play at senior level thereafter.
