= Sally James =

Sally James may refer to:

- Sally James (writer) (born 1934), pseudonym of the British romantic novelist Marina Oliver
- Sally James (presenter) (born 1950), presenter on the ITV Saturday morning children's show Tiswas
- Sally Knyvette (born 1951), British actress born Sally James
- Sally James (soccer) (born 2002), Australian soccer goalkeeper
