= Greg Hayne =

Australian cricketer (born 1971)

Personal information
- Full name: Gregory John Hayne
- Born: 2 October 1971 (age 55); Moree, New South Wales, Australia
- Source: ESPNcricinfo, 31 December 2016

Greg Hayne (born 2 October 1971) is an Australian former cricketer. He played seven first-class matches for New South Wales in 1999/00.

== See also ==
- List of New South Wales representative cricketers
