= Andrew Downton =

Australian cricketer

Personal information
- Full name: Andrew Graham Downton
- Born: 17 July 1977 (age 49); Auburn, Sydney, Australia
- Nickname: Ed
- Height: 1.83 m (6 ft 0 in)
- Batting: Right-handed
- Bowling: Left-arm fast-medium
- Role: Bowler

Domestic team information
- Years: Team
- 1998/99: Australian Cricket Academy
- 1999/00–2003/04: Tasmania
- FC debut: 22 March 1999 ACA v Matabeleland XI
- Last FC: 16 November 2004 Tasmania v New South Wales
- LA debut: 20 March 1999 ACA v Matabeleland
- Last LA: 1 February 2004 Tasmania v Western Australia

Career statistics
Competition	First-class	List A
Matches	33	7
Runs scored	294	19
Batting average	8.45	9.50
100s/50s	0/0	0/0
Top score	45	9
Balls bowled	6,158	242
Wickets	102	5
Bowling average	34.12	41.40
5 wickets in innings	4	0
10 wickets in match	0	0
Best bowling	6/56	1/3
Catches/stumpings	8/–	0/–
- Source: CricketArchive, 17 August 2010

Andrew Graham Downton (born 17 July 1977) is an Australian cricketer, who played for the Tasmanian Tigers. He plays club cricket for South Hobart/Sandy Bay Cricket Club.

Andrew Downton had an impressive start to his first class career, taking 6/56 against the New South Wales Blues on debut. However he has since struggled to come back from injuries which saw him miss most of the 2004–05 season, and recapture his impressive initial form.
