= Matthew Anderson (cricketer) =

Australian cricketer (born 1976)

Personal information
- Full name: Matthew Allan Anderson
- Born: 30 November 1976 (age 49); Darwin, Northern Territory, Australia
- Batting: Right-handed
- Bowling: Slow left-arm orthodox
- Role: Bowler

Domestic team information
- Years: Team
- 1999/2000–2002/03: Queensland

Career statistics
Competition	First-class	List A
Matches	15	2
Runs scored	19	–
Batting average	2.37	–
100s/50s	0/0	–/–
Top score	7*	–
Balls bowled	2,214	84
Wickets	27	2
Bowling average	37.62	39.00
5 wickets in innings	0	0
10 wickets in match	0	0
Best bowling	4/50	2/25
Catches/stumpings	9/–	0/–
- Source: ESPNcricinfo, 20 December 2022

Matthew Allan Anderson (born 30 November 1976) is an Australian cricketer. A slow left-arm orthodox bowler, he played in fifteen first-class matches for Queensland between 1999 and 2003.
