= Sarah Morgan =

Sarah Morgan may refer to:

- Sarah Morgan (judge) (blrn 1964), British barrister and High Court Judge
- Sarah Morgan (writer), British romance novelist
- Sarah Morgan Dawson (1842–1909), American diarist and editorial writer
- Sarah Morgan-Silvester (born 1959), Canadian academic administrator
- Sarah M. Davenport (née Morgan) (born 1976), American lawyer and United States district judge
- Sarah Morgan, British singer who competed on The Voice UK series 6
