= David Fitzgerald (cricketer) =

Australian cricketer (born 1972)

David Andrew Fitzgerald (born 30 November 1972) was an Australian first-class cricketer who played for the Southern Redbacks. He was a right-handed batsman and earned a reputation for grafting out long innings.

After starting his career with Western Australia, Fitzgerald moved to South Australia in 1995. He struggled early on for the Redbacks but began to find his feet in 1997–98 as an opening batsman and made two successive centuries to start the season.

In 1999-2000 he scored an unbeaten 111 against the touring Pakistanis. He carried his bat in the innings and became the first South Australian player in seven seasons to do so.
