= Jessika Nash =

Australian soccer player (born 2004)

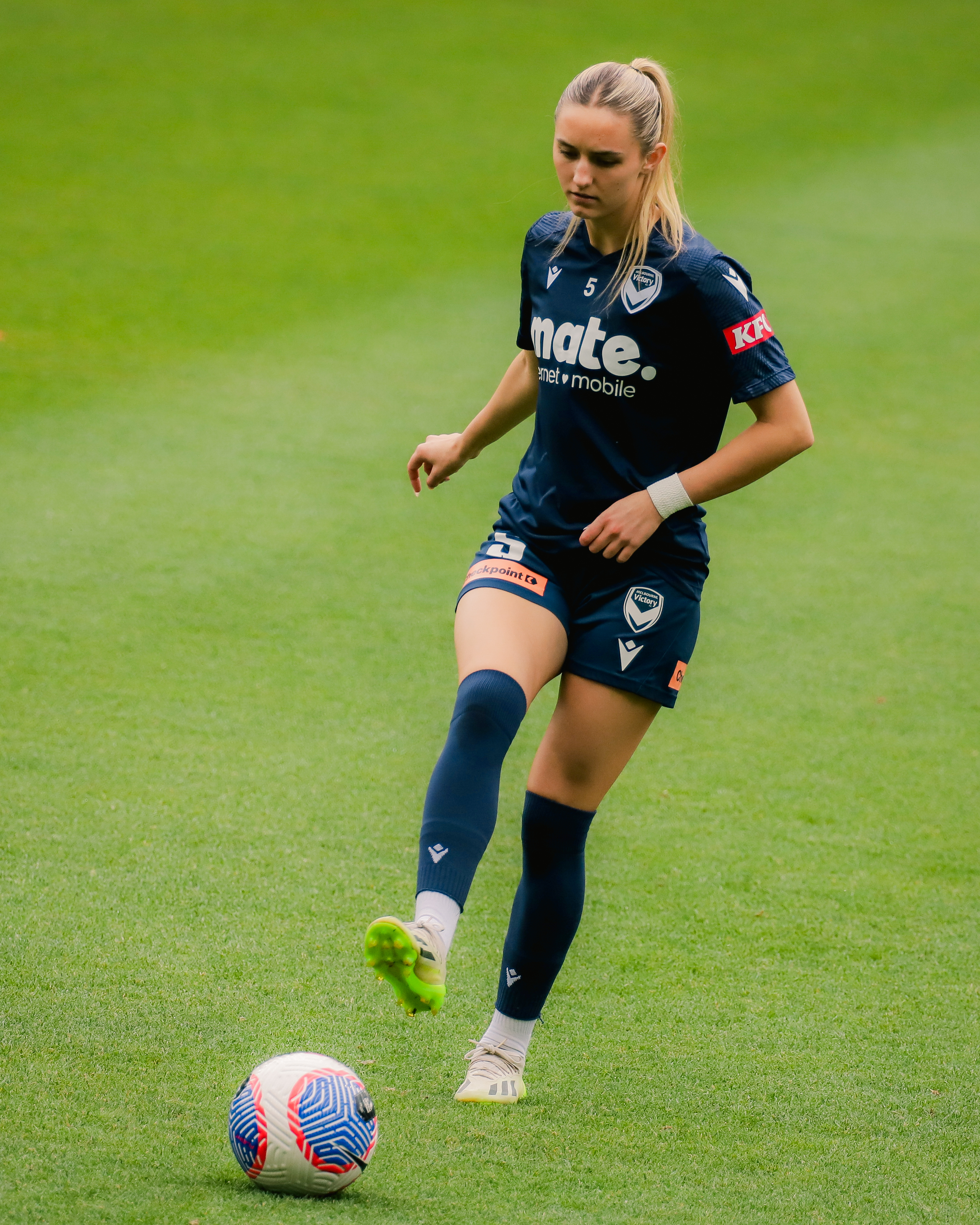
- Nash playing for Melbourne Victory in December 2023

Personal information
- Full name: Jessika Jayne Nash
- Date of birth: 5 October 2004 (age 22)
- Place of birth: Australia
- Position: Defender

Team information
- Current team: Melbourne City
- Number: 4

Youth career
- FNSW Institute

Senior career*
Years	Team	Apps	(Gls)
2020–2021	Canberra United	13	(0)
2021–2022	Sydney FC	11	(0)
2022	Blacktown Spartans	8	(0)
2022–2024	Melbourne Victory	34	(0)
2024–2025	Central Coast Mariners	27	(1)
2025–2026	Sassuolo	16	(0)
2026–	Melbourne City	0	(0)

International career^{‡}
2018–2021	Australia U17	11	(0)
2022–	Australia U20	20	(1)
2022–	Australia U23	1	(0)
2021–	Australia	4	(0)
- * Club domestic league appearances and goals as of 1 May 2026 ‡ National team caps and goals as of 10 July 2025

Jessika Jayne Nash (born 5 October 2004) is an Australian soccer player who plays for A-League Women club Melbourne City and the Australia national team. She has previously played for Canberra United, Sydney FC, Melbourne Victory, and Central Coast Mariners in the A-League Women.

== Early life ==
Nash grew up in New South Wales and played for FNSW Institute. Nash started playing football at the age of four. Nash's family was supportive of her career choice from a young age. Three generations of her family travelled to watch her play at the 2019 AFC U-16 Women's Championship. Nash's father, Don, was a cricketer for NSW Blues.

Nash attended Hills Sports High School, completing her studies in 2022.

== Club career ==
=== Canberra United ===
On 20 October 2020, Nash signed for Canberra United for the 2020–21 W-League season, together with Clare Hunt. On 30 December 2020, Nash made her W-League debut against Adelaide United in a 4–3 victory for Canberra. Nash started the match playing the full 90 minutes, with Adelaide taking a 2–0 lead during the match, only for Canberra United to strike back courtesy of a Michelle Heyman hat trick and a Laura Hughes stoppage time winner. Heyman praised Nash for her performance. After helping Canberra United qualify for the finals series with an unbeaten streak in March, Nash was nominated for the Young Footballer of the Year Award.

=== Sydney FC ===
In September 2021, Nash joined Sydney FC ahead of the 2021–22 A-League Women season, together with Sarah Hunter, looking to progress her career.

=== Melbourne Victory ===
In September 2022, Nash joined Melbourne Victory ahead of the 2022–23 A-League Women season. In August 2024, it was announced Nash wouldn't return to the club for the 2024–25 A-League Women season.

=== Central Coast Mariners ===
Following her departure from Melbourne Victory, Nash joined Central Coast Mariners.

=== Sassuolo ===
Following a season at Central Coast Mariners, in which she helped them win the championship, Nash joined Italian Serie A Femminile club Sassuolo.

=== Melbourne City ===
In August 2026, Nash returned to Australia, signing a two-year contract with Melbourne City.

== International career ==
Although the youngest member of the squad, Nash was selected as captain of the Junior Matildas, resulting in Nash being a pivotal part of the team during both 2019 AFC U-16 Women's Championship qualification and final tournament. Nash made her Junior Matildas debut on 17 September 2018, playing 90 minutes in an 11–0 victory against Palestine. She featured during six matches of qualification and she started all five games in the final tournament, playing 424 minutes. Nash made her senior Matildas debut in November 2021 in a friendly match against United States held in Sydney, which resulted in a 0–3 loss for her team. In December 2024 she was a substitute in two home friendlies against Chinese Taipei, which Matildas won 3–1 and 6–0.
