= Don Nash =

Australian cricketer (born 1978)

Personal information
- Full name: Donald Anthony Nash
- Born: 29 March 1978 (age 48); Dubbo, New South Wales, Australia
- Batting: Right-handed
- Bowling: Right arm fast-medium
- Role: Bowler
- Relatives: Jessika Nash (daughter)

Domestic team information
- Years: Team
- 1999–2004: New South Wales

Career statistics
Competition	FC	List A
Matches	37	20
Runs scored	756	175
Batting average	13.03	19.44
100s/50s	0/1	0/1
Top score	50	61*
Balls bowled	5,949	683
Wickets	99	23
Bowling average	31.06	29.69
5 wickets in innings	3	0
10 wickets in match	1	0
Best bowling	7/54	4/26
Catches/stumpings	7/–	2/–
- Source: ESPNCricinfo, 18 March 2026

Donald Anthony Nash (born 29 March 1978 in Dubbo, New South Wales) is an Australian first-class cricketer who played for the New South Wales Blues.

A right arm fast medium bowler and hard hitting lower order batsman, Nash made his first class debut in 1999-2000. In his 37-game career he took 99 wickets at 31.06 including two hauls of seven wickets in an innings. With the bat he once scored the second fastest half-century in the history of domestic one-day cricket in Australia.

== Personal life ==
He is the father of current Australian soccer player, Jessika Nash, who plays with Central Coast Mariners in the A-League Women.

== See also ==
- List of New South Wales representative cricketers
