= Ayana Aoyagi =

Australian soccer player (born 2000)

Personal information
- Full name: Ayana Aoyagi
- Date of birth: 16 June 2000 (age 26)
- Place of birth: Cairns, Queensland, Australia
- Height: 1.70 m (5 ft 7 in)
- Position: Goalkeeper

Team information
- Current team: Melbourne Victory
- Number: 25

College career
Years	Team	Apps	(Gls)
2019–2020	Tyler Apaches		
2021	Creighton Bluejays		
2022–2023	Florida Tech Panthers	25	(0)

Senior career*
Years	Team	Apps	(Gls)
2015–2017	Brisbane Roar	0	(0)
2024	Lily Wolf Ishikawa		
2025	South Melbourne	9	(0)
2025–2026	Melbourne City	0	(0)
2026–	Melbourne Victory	1	(0)
- * Club domestic league appearances and goals as of 8 November 2026

Ayana Aoyagi (Japanese: 青柳彩奈, Aoyagi Ayana, pronounced [a.o.ja.ɡi a.ja.na]; born 16 June 2000) is an Australian soccer player who plays as a goalkeeper for A-League Women club Melbourne Victory. She previously played for A-League Women clubs Brisbane Roar and Melbourne City, Hokushinetsu Women's Soccer League (HWSL) club Lily Wolf Ishikawa, and National Premier Leagues Victoria Women (NPL Victoria Women) club South Melbourne.

== Early life ==
Aoyagi was born on 16 June 2000 in Cairns, Queensland, to Lynette and Shigeto Aoyagi. She is of Japanese descent, and has two siblings.

Aoyagi attended Kelvin Grove State College in the suburb of Kelvin Grove in Brisbane, before moving to the United States to attend university. As a junior she played soccer for Far North Queensland (FNQ FC) under-15s in 2014.

== College career ==
Aoyagi first moved to the United States in 2019, and attended Tyler Junior College in Tyler, Texas, where she joined the Tyler Apaches for the 2019–20 season. In 2021, Ayagi moved to Creighton University in Omaha, Nebraska, where she played for the Creighton Bluejays during the 2021 season. In the following year, she moved to the Florida Institute of Technology in Melbourne, Florida, where she played for the Florida Tech Panthers during the 2022 and 2023 seasons.

== Club career ==
=== South Melbourne ===
Aoyagi signed for National Premier Leagues Victoria Women (NPL Victoria Women) club South Melbourne ahead of the 2025 season. She made her debut as a defender on 5 April 2025, coming on as a substitute for Akeisha Sandu in the 87th minute of a 5–1 away win over Heidelberg United at Olympic Park. She made her starting debut as a goalkeeper on 3 May 2025 in a 1–1 home draw with Spring Hills FC at Lakeside Stadium in Albert Park. She kept her first clean sheet on 15 June 2025 in a 1–0 home win over Bentleigh Greens. She finished the season with three clean sheets in nine appearances.

=== Melbourne City ===
Aoyagi signed for A-League Women club Melbourne City ahead of the 2025–26 season. Despite not playing a match, she was a valued member of the playing group and departed at the end of her contract in August 2026.

=== Melbourne Victory ===
In September 2026, Aoyagi joined cross-city rival team Melbourne Victory. She made her A-League Women début on 7 November 2026, starting and playing the entire match against her old club Brisbane Roar in a 2–0 away defeat at Spencer Park after being brought in due to starting goalkeeper Courtney Newbon's injury.

== Personal life ==
Known for her social media presence, outside soccer Aoyagi has also worked as a disability support carer, freelance photographer, Instagram content creator, model and recruitment agent for American universities. She has also commentated National Premier Leagues Victoria Women (NPL Victoria Women) matches.
