= Talia Kapetanellis =

Australian soccer player (born 2004)

Personal information
- Date of birth: 3 December 2004 (age 21)
- Place of birth: Sydney, New South Wales, Australia
- Positions: Forward; midfielder

Team information
- Current team: Central Coast Mariners
- Number: 8

Youth career
- 2012–2015: Sans Souci
- 2016: Sydney Olympic
- 2017–2022: Sydney Uni

Senior career*
Years	Team	Apps	(Gls)
2023–2025	Sydney Uni		
2024–2025	Western Sydney Wanderers	16	(1)
2026	APIA Leichhardt	26	(11)
2026–	Central Coast Mariners	3	(5)
- * Club domestic league appearances and goals as of 31 October 2026

Talia Kapetanellis (Greek: Τάλια Καπετανέλλης, pronounced [kapetaˈnelis]; born 3 December 2004) is a professional Australian soccer player who plays as a forward for A-League Women club Central Coast Mariners. She previously played as a midfielder for rival club Western Sydney Wanderers.

== Early years ==
Talia Kapetanellis was born on 3 December 2004 in Sydney. Her paternal grandparents, Gavriil and Sophia Kapetanellis emigrated from Greece in 1962 to settle in Sydney. While attending Bald Face Public School in Blakehurst, she was selected for the under-9 Sydney East Schools Soccer Association team. She played junior soccer for Sans Souci (2012–2015) and then Sydney Olympic (2016), which compete in the National Premier Leagues NSW Women's (NPL NSW). Also at Sans Souci, but in a different age group, was family friend and future club teammate, Peta Trimis, who is also of Greek descent. Kapetanellis played for Sydney University Soccer Football Club (women) (Sydney Uni) under-13 team, also in the NPL NSW, in 2017.

== Club career ==
Kapetanellis was promoted to the Sydney Uni seniors in 2023 in the NPL NSW. At the end of the 2024 season she won the club's Golden Boot award for most goals scored with a tally of 14. Her side competed in the NPL NSW's 2024 Sapphire Cup, but were defeated by Northern Tigers (women) in the grand final.

On 14 October 2024 Kapetanellis signed with Western Sydney Wanderers in the A-League Women for their 2024–25 season. She made her debut as a midfielder on 3 November 2024 in their 2–2 draw against Newcastle Jets. Kapetanellis scored her first goal on 5 January 2025 in a 4–4 draw against Melbourne Victory. After 16 appearances – all as a substitute – she was dropped from the team on 8 July 2025. The midfielder considered giving up soccer, but returned to Sydney Uni in the NPL NSW for the rest of 2025.

For the 2026 NPL NSW season Kapetanellis transferred to APIA Leichhardt FC (women) in January, where she provided 11 goals and 10 assists during the season. As a forward she returned to the A-League Women by signing with Central Coast Mariners on 20 September for their 2026–27 season. In her first three appearances she scored five goals, playing alongside fellow forwards Trimis and Skye Halmarick.
