= 2021–22 Melbourne Victory FC (women) season =

14th season in existence of Melbourne Victory (women)

Melbourne Victory (women)
2021–22 season
- Chairman: Anthony Di Pietro
- Head Coach: Jeff Hopkins
- Stadium: AAMI Park (doubleheaders)
- A-League Women: 4th
- A-League Women Finals: Winners
- Highest home attendance: 4,682 vs. Melbourne City (26 December 2021); A-League Women
- Lowest home attendance: 605 vs. Brisbane Roar (2 January 2022); A-League Women
- Average home league attendance: 1,939
- Biggest win: 5–0 vs. Western Sydney Wanderers (H) (12 February 2022); A-League Women
- Biggest defeat: 1–5 vs. Melbourne City (H) (26 December 2021); A-League Women
Home colours	Away colours

The 2021–22 season was Melbourne Victory Football Club (women)'s 14th season in the A-League Women. Melbourne Victory finished 4th in their A-League Women season, and won the Grand Final.

== Players ==
Note: Flags indicate national team as defined under FIFA eligibility rules; some limited exceptions apply. Players may hold more than one non-FIFA nationality.

No.	Pos.	Nation	Player
1	GK	AUS	Casey Dumont
2	MF	AUS	Tiffany Eliadis
3	DF	AUS	Claudia Bunge
4	MF	AUS	Emma Robers
5	DF	AUS	Courtney Nevin
6	FW	USA	Lynn Williams (on loan from North Carolina Courage)
7	MF	AUS	Kyra Cooney-Cross
8	MF	AUS	Alana Murphy
9	FW	USA	Catherine Zimmerman
10	MF	AUS	Alex Chidiac (on loan from JEF United Chiba)
11	FW	AUS	Harriet Withers
13	DF	AUS	Polly Doran

No.	Pos.	Nation	Player
14	FW	AUS	Melina Ayres
15	MF	AUS	Amy Jackson
16	MF	AUS	Paige Zois
17	FW	AUS	Maja Markovski
18	DF	AUS	Kayla Morrison
19	FW	AUS	Lia Privitelli
20	GK	AUS	Melissa Maizels
22	DF	AUS	Francesca Iermano
25	DF	USA	Brooke Hendrix
30	MF	AUS	MelindaJ Barbieri
40	GK	AUS	Sophia Varley

== Transfers and contracts ==
=== Transfers in ===
No.	Position	Player	Transferred from	Type/fee	Date	Ref.
8	MF	Alana Murphy	Unattached	Free transfer	11 August 2021	
11	FW	Harriet Withers	Melbourne City	Free transfer	29 September 2021	
5	DF	Courtney Nevin	Western Sydney Wanderers	Free transfer	2 October 2021	
1	GK	Casey Dumont	Unattached	Free transfer	5 October 2021	
4	MF	Emma Robers	Unattached	Free transfer	10 November 2021	
6	FW	Lynn Williams	(United States) North Carolina Courage	Loan	4 December 2021	
40	GK	Sophia Varley	Melbourne City	Free transfer	5 December 2021	
10	MF	Alex Chidiac	(Japan) JEF United Chiba	Loan	9 December 2021	
22	DF	Francesca Iermano	Unattached	Free transfer	17 December 2021	
25	DF	(United States) Brooke Hendrix	(United States) Racing Louisville	Free transfer	3 February 2022	

=== Transfers out ===
No.	Position	Player	Transferred to	Type/fee	Date	Ref.
4	MF	(Canada) Natalie Martineau	(Australia) South Melbourne	Free transfer	17 April 2021	
8	DF	Angela Beard	(Denmark) Fortuna Hjørring	Free transfer	18 June 2021	
10	MF	(New Zealand) Annalie Longo	Unattached	Free transfer	4 September 2021	
5	FW	Gabe Marzano	Retired		1 November 2021	
6	DF	Natalie Tathem	Brisbane Roar	Free transfer	1 November 2021	
1	GK	(Argentina) Gaby Garton	Unattached	Free transfer	12 November 2021	
11	FW	Lisa De Vanna	Perth Glory	Free transfer	25 November 2021	
6	FW	Lynn Williams	(United States) North Carolina Courage	Loan return	13 January 2022	

=== Contract extensions ===
No.	Position	Player	Duration	Date	Ref.
3	DF	(New Zealand) Claudia Bunge	1 year	5 August 2021	
13	DF	Polly Doran	1 year	5 August 2021	
18	DF	(United States) Kayla Morrison	1 year	5 August 2021	
15	MF	Amy Jackson	1 year	12 August 2021	
30	MF	MelindaJ Barbieri	1 year	12 August 2021	
9	FW	(United States) Catherine Zimmerman	1 year	19 August 2021	
19	FW	Lia Privitelli	1 year	19 August 2021	
2	MF	Tiffany Eliadis	1 year	16 September 2021	
16	MF	Paige Zois	2 years	29 September 2021	
20	GK	Melissa Maizels	1 year	5 October 2021	
17	FW	Maja Markovski	1 year	10 November 2021	

== Competitions ==
=== Overall record ===
Competition	First match	Last match	Starting round	Final position	Record							
Competition	First match	Last match	Starting round	Final position	Pld	W	D	L	GF	GA	GD	Win %
A-League Women	5 December 2021	4 March 2022	Matchday 1	4th	14	7	3	4	26	22	+4	50.00
A-League Women Finals	13 March 2022	27 March 2022	Semi-finals	Winners	3	3	0	0	7	3	+4	100.00
Total					17	10	3	4	33	25	+8	58.82

Source: Competitions

=== A-League Women ===
==== League table ====
Pos	Team	Pld	W	D	L	GF	GA	GD	Pts	Qualification
1	Sydney FC	14	11	2	1	36	6	+30	35	Qualification to Finals series
2	Melbourne City	14	11	0	3	29	11	+18	33	Qualification to Finals series
3	Adelaide United	14	9	0	5	33	18	+15	27	Qualification to Finals series
4	Melbourne Victory (C)	14	7	3	4	26	22	+4	24	Qualification to Finals series
5	Perth Glory	14	7	3	4	20	23	−3	24	
6	Brisbane Roar	14	5	2	7	29	30	−1	17	
7	Canberra United	14	2	7	5	24	29	−5	13	
8	Newcastle Jets	14	2	4	8	15	30	−15	10	
9	Western Sydney Wanderers	14	1	4	9	7	27	−20	7	
10	Wellington Phoenix	14	2	1	11	13	36	−23	7	

Source: A-Leagues
Rules for classification: 1) points; 2) goal difference; 3) number of goals scored.
(C) Champions

==== Results summary ====
Overall								Home						Away					
Pld	W	D	L	GF	GA	GD	Pts	W	D	L	GF	GA	GD	W	D	L	GF	GA	GD
14	7	3	4	26	22	+4	24	2	2	3	15	14	+1	5	1	1	11	8	+3

Source: worldfootball.net

==== Results by round ====
Round	1	2	3	4	5	7	10	6	11	9	12	8	13	14
Ground	H	A	A	H	H	A	A	A	H	H	H	A	A	H
Result	W	W	W	L	L	W	W	W	W	D	L	D	L	D
Position	1	1	2	3	3	3	4	4	4	3	4	4	4	4
Points	3	6	9	9	9	12	15	18	21	22	22	23	23	24

Source: A-Leagues
A = Away; H = Home; W = Win; D = Draw; L = Loss

==== Matches ====
The first four rounds of the league fixtures were announced on 23 September 2021. The rest were announced on 9 November 2021.

Win Draw Loss

5 December 2021 1	Melbourne Victory	5–1	Adelaide United	Melbourne
16:05 AEDT	Privitelli 10', 69'; Morrison 19'; Bunge 23'; Zimmerman 39'	Report	Worts 64'	Stadium: AAMI Park; Attendance: 3,450; Referee: Isabella Blaess

12 December 2021 2	Melbourne City	1–2	Melbourne Victory	Melbourne
16:05 AEDT	Jackson 49' (o.g.)	Report	Zimmerman 65'; Williams 70'	Stadium: AAMI Park; Attendance: 1,092; Referee: Casey Reibelt

18 December 2021 3	Brisbane Roar	2–3	Melbourne Victory	Brisbane
16:05 AEST	Connors 65'; Crummer 90+4'	Report	Biyendolo 36'; Withers 46'; Zimmerman 85'	Stadium: Moreton Daily Stadium; Attendance: 1,258; Referee: Lara Lee

26 December 2021 4	Melbourne Victory	1–5	Melbourne City	Melbourne
17:05 AEDT	Markovski 84'	Report	Wilkinson 5', 13', 26', 56', 75'	Stadium: AAMI Park; Attendance: 4,682; Referee: Lara Lee

2 January 2022 5	Melbourne Victory	2–4	Brisbane Roar	Melbourne
16:05 AEDT	Rasschaert 6' (o.g.); Williams 26'	Report	Crummer 59'; Gorry 86'; Connors 90'; Norire 90+6'	Stadium: AAMI Park; Attendance: 605; Referee: Isabella Blaess

16 January 2022 7	Western Sydney Wanderers	0–1	Melbourne Victory	Sydney
16:05 AEDT		Report	Markovski 74' (pen.)	Stadium: CommBank Stadium; Attendance: 458; Referee: Rachael Mitchenson

4 February 2022 10	Wellington Phoenix	0–2	Melbourne Victory	Wollongong
18:35 AEDT		Report	Murphy 13'; Eliadis 23'	Stadium: WIN Stadium; Attendance: 61; Referee: Caitlin Williams
Note: Match originally scheduled for 6 February, but rescheduled for 4 February.

8 February 2022 6	Newcastle Jets	0–1	Melbourne Victory	Newcastle
17:25 AEDT		Report	Hendrix 55'	Stadium: McDonald Jones Stadium; Attendance: 1,135; Referee: Kelly Jones
Note: Match originally scheduled for 7 January at No.2 Sportsground, but postponed due to positive COVID-19 cases. It was rescheduled and relocated for 8 February at McDonald Jones Stadium.

12 February 2022 11	Melbourne Victory	5–0	Western Sydney Wanderers	Melbourne
16:50 AEDT	Zimmerman 5', 60'; Barbieri 32'; Cooney-Cross 58'; Nevin 63'	Report		Stadium: AAMI Park; Attendance: 1,691; Referee: Kelly Jones

16 February 2022 9	Melbourne Victory	2–2	Sydney FC	Melbourne
20:05 AEDT	Privitelli 68'; Zimmerman 90+2'	Report	Ibini-Isei 50'; Siemsen 60'	Stadium: City Vista Recreation Reserve; Attendance: 814; Referee: Rachael Mitchenson
Note: Match originally scheduled for 26 January at AAMI Park, but postponed due to positive COVID-19 cases within the team of Melbourne Victory. It was rescheduled and relocated for 16 February at City Vista Recreation Reserve.

19 February 2022 12	Melbourne Victory	0–2	Perth Glory	Melbourne
17:05 AEDT		Report	Withers 69' (o.g.); Khamis 73'	Stadium: AAMI Park; Attendance: 1,243; Referee: Rebecca Mackie

22 February 2022 8	Canberra United	2–2	Melbourne Victory	Canberra
17:25 AEDT	Washington 41'; Heyman 48'	Report	Chidiac 81'; Eliadis 90+1'	Stadium: Viking Park; Attendance: 1,089; Referee: Rachael Mitchenson
Note: Match originally scheduled for 23 January, but postponed due to positive COVID-19 cases within the team of Canberra United. It was rescheduled for 22 February.

26 February 2022 13	Adelaide United	3–0	Melbourne Victory	Adelaide
16:20 ACDT	Worts 18', 25', 46'	Report		Stadium: Coopers Stadium; Attendance: 2,421; Referee: Lara Lee

4 March 2022 14	Melbourne Victory	0–0	Canberra United	Melbourne
17:05 AEDT		Report		Stadium: AAMI Park; Attendance: 1,091; Referee: Rebecca Mackie

==== Finals series ====
13 March 2022 Semi-finals	Adelaide United	1–2	Melbourne Victory	Adelaide
15:35 ACDT	Sasaki 32'	Report	Privitelli 29'; Ayres 57'	Stadium: Coopers Stadium; Attendance: 2,607; Referee: Lara Lee

20 March 2022 Preliminary Final	Melbourne City	1–3	Melbourne Victory	Melbourne
16:05 AEDT	Tumeth 80'	Report	Ayres 30'; Bunge 47'; Privitelli 53'	Stadium: AAMI Park; Attendance: 1,306; Referee: Casey Reibelt

27 March 2022 Grand Final	Sydney FC	1–2	Melbourne Victory	Sydney
16:05 AEDT	Vine 66'	Report	Jackson 49'; Zimmerman 64'	Stadium: Netstrata Jubilee Stadium; Attendance: 5,027; Referee: Lara Lee

== Statistics ==
=== Appearances and goals ===
Includes all competitions. Players with no appearances not included in the list.

No.	Pos	Nat	Player	Total		A-League Women		A-League Women Finals	
No.	Pos	Nat	Player	Apps	Goals	Apps	Goals	Apps	Goals
1	GK	(Australia) AUS	Casey Dumont	16	0	13	0	3	0
2	MF	(Australia) AUS	Tiffany Eliadis	13	2	6+4	2	1+2	0
3	DF	(Australia) AUS	Claudia Bunge	13	3	10	2	3	1
4	MF	(Australia) AUS	Emma Robers	8	0	1+7	0	0	0
5	DF	(Australia) AUS	Courtney Nevin	15	1	12	1	3	0
6	FW	(United States) USA	Lynn Williams	4	3	3+1	3	0	0
7	MF	(Australia) AUS	Kyra Cooney-Cross	14	1	12	1	2	0
8	MF	(Australia) AUS	Alana Murphy	13	1	8+3	1	0+2	0
9	FW	(United States) USA	Catherine Zimmerman	16	7	13	6	3	1
10	MF	(Australia) AUS	Alex Chidiac	14	1	10+1	1	3	0
11	FW	(Australia) AUS	Harriet Withers	13	1	3+8	1	0+2	0
13	DF	(Australia) AUS	Polly Doran	17	0	14	0	3	0
14	FW	(Australia) AUS	Melina Ayres	4	2	0+1	0	3	2
15	MF	(Australia) AUS	Amy Jackson	12	3	9	2	3	1
16	MF	(Australia) AUS	Paige Zois	7	0	2+5	0	0	0
17	FW	(Australia) AUS	Maja Markovski	14	2	7+6	2	0+1	0
18	DF	(Australia) AUS	Kayla Morrison	1	1	1	1	0	0
19	FW	(Australia) AUS	Lia Privitelli	16	5	11+2	3	3	2
20	GK	(Australia) AUS	Melissa Maizels	1	0	1	0	0	0
22	DF	(Australia) AUS	Francesca Iermano	3	0	2+1	0	0	0
25	DF	(United States) USA	Brooke Hendrix	11	1	7+1	1	3	0
30	MF	(Australia) AUS	MelindaJ Barbieri	13	1	9+4	1	0	0

- Source: Soccerway

=== Disciplinary record ===
Includes all competitions. The list is sorted by squad number when total cards are equal. Players with no cards not included in the list.

No.	Pos	Nat	Player	Total			A-League Women			A-League Women Finals		
No.	Pos	Nat	Player	Yellow card	Second yellow card	Red card	Yellow card	Second yellow card	Red card	Yellow card	Second yellow card	Red card
7	MF	(Australia) AUS	Kyra Cooney-Cross	4	0	1	4	0	1	0	0	0
15	MF	(Australia) AUS	Amy Jackson	2	0	1	1	0	1	1	0	0
13	DF	(Australia) AUS	Polly Doran	4	0	0	1	0	0	3	0	0
5	DF	(Australia) AUS	Courtney Nevin	3	0	0	1	0	0	2	0	0
9	FW	(United States) USA	Catherine Zimmerman	3	0	0	3	0	0	0	0	0
1	GK	(Australia) AUS	Casey Dumont	1	0	0	1	0	0	0	0	0
2	MF	(Australia) AUS	Tiffany Eliadis	1	0	0	1	0	0	0	0	0
11	FW	(Australia) AUS	Harriet Withers	1	0	0	1	0	0	0	0	0
16	MF	(Australia) AUS	Paige Zois	1	0	0	1	0	0	0	0	0
17	FW	(Australia) AUS	Maja Markovski	1	0	0	1	0	0	0	0	0
25	DF	(United States) USA	Brooke Hendrix	1	0	0	1	0	0	0	0	0

- Source: Soccerway
- (yellow card) = Number of bookings; (second yellow card) = Number of sending offs after a second yellow card; (red card) = Number of sending offs by a direct red card.
