= 2019–20 Melbourne Victory FC (women) season =

Melbourne Victory Women
2019–20 season
- Chairman: Anthony Di Pietro
- Head Coach: Jeff Hopkins
- Stadium: Lakeside Stadium
- W-League: 2nd
- AFC Women's Club Championship: 4th
- Top goalscorer: League: Natasha Dowie (7); All: Natasha Dowie (7)
Home colours	Away colours

The 2019–20 season was the Melbourne Victory Women's twelfth season in the W-League, and twelfth in top flight Australian women's soccer. The club participated in the A-League Women and the AFC Women's Club Championship.

== Players ==
Note: Flags indicate national team as defined under FIFA eligibility rules; some limited exceptions apply. Players may hold more than one non-FIFA nationality.

No.	Pos.	Nation	Player
1	GK	AUS	Casey Dumont
2	FW	AUS	Rosie Sutton
3	DF	AUS	Teigen Allen
4	DF	USA	Emily Menges (on loan from Portland Thorns)
5	DF	AUS	Laura Brock
6	MF	USA	Haley Hanson
7	MF	AUS	Emma Robers
8	DF	AUS	Angela Beard
9	FW	ENG	Natasha Dowie
10	DF	AUS	Jenna McCormick

No.	Pos.	Nation	Player
11	FW	USA	Darian Jenkins
13	MF	AUS	Polly Doran
14	FW	AUS	Melina Ayres
15	MF	AUS	Amy Jackson
16	MF	NZL	Annalie Longo
17	DF	AUS	Alexandra Gummer
18	MF	AUS	Grace Maher
19	FW	AUS	Lia Privitelli
20	GK	AUS	Melissa Maizels
30	GK	AUS	Teagan Micah

== Transfers ==
=== Transfers in ===
No.	Position	Player	Transferred from	Type/fee	Contract length	Date	Ref
10	DF	Jenna McCormick	Brisbane Roar	Free		5 October 2019	
20	GK	Melissa Maizels	Canberra United	Free		24 October 2019	
16	MF	(New Zealand) Annalie Longo	Unattached	Free		25 October 2019	
15	MF	Amy Jackson	Melbourne City	Undisclosed		30 October 2019	
2	FW	Rosie Sutton	Unattached	Free		30 October 2019	
13	MF	Polly Doran	(Australia) Calder United	Undisclosed		31 October 2019	
7	MF	Emma Robers	(Australia) Calder United	Undisclosed		31 October 2019	
4	DF	(United States) Emily Menges	(United States) Portland Thorns	Loan	1 year	6 November 2019	
6	MF	(United States) Haley Hanson	(United States) Houston Dash	Free		6 November 2019	
11	FW	(United States) Darian Jenkins	(United States) Reign FC	Free		6 November 2019	

=== Transfers out ===
No.	Position	Player	Transferred to	Type/fee	Date	Ref
15	FW	Emily Gielnik	(Germany) Bayern Munich	Free	23 August 2019	
6	DF	Annabel Martin	Newcastle Jets	Undisclosed	11 October 2019	
16	DF	(United States) Samantha Johnson	Retired		22 October 2019	
10	FW	Kyra Cooney-Cross	Western Sydney Wanderers	Free	6 November 2019	
21	MF	Ella Mastrantonio	Western Sydney Wanderers	Free	8 November 2019	
11	MF	MelindaJ Barbieri	Unattached	Undisclosed	12 November 2019	
20	GK	Bethany Mason-Jones	(United States) Houston Dash	Undisclosed	12 November 2019	
7	MF	(United States) Christine Nairn	(United States) Houston Dash	Free	12 November 2019	
17	MF	(United States) Dani Weatherholt	(United States) Orlando Pride	Loan return	12 November 2019	

== W-League ==
=== League table ===
Pos	Team	Pld	W	D	L	GF	GA	GD	Pts	Qualification
1	Melbourne City (C)	12	11	1	0	27	4	+23	34	Qualification to Finals series
2	Melbourne Victory	12	7	2	3	24	14	+10	23	Qualification to Finals series
3	Sydney FC	12	7	1	4	21	13	+8	22	Qualification to Finals series
4	Western Sydney Wanderers	12	7	1	4	24	20	+4	22	Qualification to Finals series
5	Brisbane Roar	12	5	2	5	22	19	+3	17	
6	Canberra United	12	4	1	7	13	29	−16	13	
7	Perth Glory	12	3	2	7	19	24	−5	11	
8	Adelaide United	12	2	1	9	12	24	−12	7	
9	Newcastle Jets	12	2	1	9	12	27	−15	7	

Source: A-Leagues
Rules for classification: 1) points; 2) goal difference; 3) number of goals scored.
(C) Champions

=== Matches ===
Win Draw Loss

17 November 2019 1	Sydney FC	3–0	Melbourne Victory	Sydney
16:00 AEDT	Siemsen 4', 22'; Evans 90+2'	Report		Stadium: Netstrata Jubilee Stadium; Attendance: 3,219; Referee: Kate Jacewicz

21 November 2019 2	Brisbane Roar	2–3	Melbourne Victory	Brisbane
	Yallop 24'; Riley 80'	Report	Torpey 10' (o.g.); Dowie 14' (pen.), 76'	Stadium: Dolphin Oval; Attendance: 2,139; Referee: Rachel Mitchenson

7 December 2019 4	Melbourne Victory	1–1	Western Sydney Wanderers	Melbourne
	Hanson 8'	Report	Williams 62'	Stadium: Latrobe City Stadium; Attendance: 443; Referee: Kelly Jones

12 December 2019 5	Melbourne City	1–0	Melbourne Victory	Melbourne
	Kinga 89'	Report		Stadium: ABD Stadium; Attendance: 907; Referee: Isabella Blaess

21 December 2019 6	Melbourne Victory	0–0	Brisbane Roar	Melbourne
10:30 AEDT		Report		Stadium: Epping Stadium; Attendance: 406; Referee: Rachel Mitchenson

28 December 2019 7	Perth Glory	1–2	Melbourne Victory FC	Perth
	McKenna 60'	Report	Jackson 33', 53'	Stadium: Dorrien Gardens; Attendance: 618; Referee: Isabella Blaess

5 January 2020 8	Melbourne Victory	2–1	Newcastle Jets	Melbourne
	Dowie 10'; Jenkins 25'	Report	Simon 61'	Stadium: AAMI Park; Attendance: 4,961; Referee: Rebecca Durcau

18 January 2020 10	Adelaide United	0–3	Melbourne Victory	Adelaide
		Report	Dowie 17', 81'; Sutton 78'	Stadium: Marden Sports Complex; Attendance: 692; Referee: Rachel Mitchenson

26 January 2020 11	Melbourne Victory	3–0	Canberra United	Melbourne
	Ayres 31', 38'; Dowie 77'	Report		Stadium: Lakeside Stadium; Attendance: 562; Referee: Lara Lee

13 February 2020 12	Melbourne Victory	0–4	Melbourne City	Melbourne
		Report	van Egmond 21'; Emslie 31', 50'; Simon 57'	Stadium: Lakeside Stadium; Attendance: 1,097; Referee: Rebecca Durcau

23 February 2020 13	Newcastle Jets	0–7	Melbourne Victory	Newcastle
		Report	Longo 3', 7'; Dowie 33'; Jenkins 40', 59'; Davis 69' (o.g.); Ayres 83'	Stadium: McDonald Jones Stadium; Attendance: 1,321; Referee: Isabella Blaess

29 February 2020 14	Melbourne Victory	3–1	Sydney FC	Melbourne
	Jackson 25'; Jenkins 49', 78'	Report	Tobin 90'	Stadium: Marvel Stadium; Attendance: 3,310; Referee: Casey Reibelt

==== Finals series ====
14 March 2020 Semi-final	Melbourne Victory	0–1	Sydney FC	Melbourne
14:00 AEDT		Report	Latsko 14'	Stadium: Epping Stadium; Attendance: 704; Referee: Lara Lee
