= 2022 A-League Women grand final =

- Event: A-League Women
Sydney FC	Melbourne Victory
1	2
- Date: 27 March 2022
- Venue: Jubilee Oval, Sydney
- Player of the Match: Casey Dumont
- Referee: Lara Lee
- Attendance: 5,027
- Weather: Showers

The 2022 A-League Women grand final was the final match of the 2021–22 A-League Women season, played on 27 March 2022 between Sydney FC and Melbourne Victory at Jubilee Oval (Kogorah Oval) in Sydney. Melbourne won the match 2–1.

The win made Melbourne the second club to win back-to-back A-League Women championships, and was their third title overall. It was Sydney's fifth consecutive Grand Final appearance. It was Melbourne Victory's third win in four finals against Sydney.

== Teams ==
Team	Previous grand final appearances (bold indicates winners)
Sydney FC	8 (**2009 (Dec)**, 2011, **2013**, 2016, 2018, **2019**, 2020, 2021)
Melbourne Victory FC	3 (2013, **2014 (Feb)**, **2021**)

== Route to the final ==
Sydney FC		Round	Melbourne Victory FC	
1st place: Pos / Team / Pld / Pts; **1** / Sydney FC / **14** / **35**; 2 / Melbourne City / 14 / **33**; 3 / Adelaide United / 14 / **27**; 4 / Melbourne Victory (C) / 14 / **24**; 5 / Perth Glory / 14 / **24**; Source: A-Leagues (C) Champions		Regular season	4th place: Pos / Team / Pld / Pts; 2 / Melbourne City / 14 / **33**; 3 / Adelaide United / 14 / **27**; **4** / Melbourne Victory (C) / **14** / **24**; 5 / Perth Glory / 14 / **24**; 6 / Brisbane Roar / 14 / **17**; Source: A-Leagues (C) Champions	
Opponent	Score		Opponent	Score
Melbourne City	4–2 (a.e.t)	Semi-finals	Adelaide United	1–2
Bye		Preliminary final	Melbourne City	1–3

=== Finals ===
Semi-finals
**1**	**Sydney FC (a.e.t.)**	**4**
2	Melbourne City	2
3	Adelaide United	1
**4**	**Melbourne Victory**	**2**

Preliminary final
2	Melbourne City	1
**4**	**Melbourne Victory**	**3**

Grand final
1	Sydney FC	1
**4**	**Melbourne Victory**	**2**

Sydney qualified for the Grand Final directly, by defeating Melbourne City in a playoff between the top two. Melbourne qualified after winning sudden death games against Adelaide United and Melbourne City.

== Match ==
=== Details ===
27 March 2022
16:05 AEDT

Sydney FC	1–2	Melbourne Victory
Vine 66'	Report	Jackson 49'; Zimmerman 64'

Jubilee Oval, Sydney
Attendance: 5,027
Referee: Lara Lee

**Sydney FC**	**Melbourne Victory**

GK	1	(Australia) Jada Whyman
DF	5	(New Zealand) Ally Green		(substituted off) 86'
DF	12	(Australia) Natalie Tobin (c)
DF	3	(Australia) Charlotte McLean
DF	19	(Australia) Charlize Rule	(yellow card) 77'
MF	23	(Australia) Taylor Ray
MF	11	(Australia) Cortnee Vine
MF	6	(Australia) Sarah Hunter		(substituted off) 63'
MF	15	(Australia) Mackenzie Hawkesby
MF	20	(Australia) Princess Ibini
FW	10	(Australia) Remy Siemsen		(substituted off) 72'
Substitutes:
GK	30	(Australia) Katie Offer
DF	4	(Australia) Jessika Nash
MF	8	(Australia) Rachel Lowe		(substituted on) 63'
FW	9	(Chile) María José Rojas		(substituted on) 72'
FW	14	(New Zealand) Paige Satchell		(substituted on) 86'
Manager:
(Australia) Ante Juric

GK	1	(Australia) Casey Dumont
DF	5	(Australia) Courtney Nevin	(yellow card) 8'
DF	25	(United States) Brooke Hendrix
DF	3	(New Zealand) Claudia Bunge
DF	13	(Australia) Polly Doran	(yellow card) 82'
MF	15	(Australia) Amy Jackson
MF	10	(Australia) Alex Chidiac		(substituted off) 88'
MF	7	(Australia) Kyra Cooney-Cross
MF	9	(United States) Catherine Zimmerman
FW	14	(Australia) Melina Ayres
FW	19	(Australia) Lia Privitelli (c)		(substituted off) 90+1'
Substitutes:
GK	20	(Australia) Melissa Maizels
DF	2	(Australia) Tiffany Eliadis		(substituted on) 88'
FW	8	(Australia) Alana Murphy
MF	11	(Australia) Harriet Withers		(substituted on) 90+1'
FW	17	(Australia) Maja Markovski
Manager:
(Wales) Jeff Hopkins

Player of the Match:
Casey Dumont

Assistant referees:
Lauren Hargrave
Delfina Dimoski
Fourth official:
Maggie Price

**Match rules**

- 90 minutes.
- 30 minutes of extra-time if necessary.
- Penalty shoot-out if scores still level.
- Five named substitutes.
- Maximum of three substitutions.

== Broadcasting ==
The match was broadcast nationally on 10 Bold and streamed by 10Play and Paramount+.
