= 2021 W-League grand final =

- Event: 2020–21 W-League
Sydney FC	Melbourne Victory
0	1
- Date: 11 April 2021
- Venue: Netstrata Jubilee Stadium, Sydney
- Player of the Match: Jada Mathyssen-Whyman
- Referee: Rebecca Durcau
- Attendance: 4,619

The 2021 W-League grand final was the final match of the 2020–21 W-League season to decide the champions of women's soccer in Australia for the season.

The match was played between Sydney FC and Melbourne Victory at Netstrata Jubilee Stadium on 11 April 2021. Melbourne Victory won their second championship with a goal from Kyra Cooney-Cross after 120 minutes.

This was the league's last match under its original "W-League" branding. Football Australia changed the league's name to A-League Women effective with the 2021–22 season.

== Teams ==
Team	Previous grand final appearances (bold indicates winners)
Sydney FC	7 (**2009 (Dec)**, 2011, **2013**, 2016, 2018, **2019**, 2020)
Melbourne Victory FC	2 (2013, **2014 (Feb)**)

== Route to the final ==
Sydney FC		Round	Melbourne Victory FC	
1st place: Pos / Team / Pld / Pts; **1** / Sydney FC / **12** / **28**; 2 / Brisbane Roar / 12 / **25**; 3 / Melbourne Victory (C) / 12 / **23**; 4 / Canberra United / 12 / **22**; 5 / Adelaide United / 12 / **22**; Source: A-Leagues (C) Champions		Regular season	3rd place: Pos / Team / Pld / Pts; 1 / Sydney FC / 12 / **28**; 2 / Brisbane Roar / 12 / **25**; **3** / Melbourne Victory (C) / **12** / **23**; 4 / Canberra United / 12 / **22**; 5 / Adelaide United / 12 / **22**; Source: A-Leagues (C) Champions	
Opponent	Score		Opponent	Score
Canberra United	3–0 (H)	Semi-finals	Brisbane Roar	2–6 (A)

== Match details ==
11 April 2021
16:00 AEST

Sydney FC	0–1 (a.e.t.)	Melbourne Victory
	Report	Cooney-Cross 120'

Netstrata Jubilee Stadium, Sydney
Attendance: 4,619
Referee: Rebecca Durcau

**Sydney FC**

GK	1	(Australia) Jada Mathyssen-Whyman
RB	3	(Australia) Charlotte McLean		(substituted off) 89'
CB	13	(Australia) Natasha Prior
CB	12	(Australia) Natalie Tobin
LB	5	(Australia) Ally Green
DM	2	(Australia) Teresa Polias (c)	(yellow card) 120+4'
RM	8	(Australia) Rachel Lowe	(yellow card) 70'
CM	6	(Australia) Clare Wheeler
CM	15	(Australia) Mackenzie Hawkesby		(substituted off) 114'
LM	18	(Australia) Princess Ibini-Isei		(substituted off) 62'
CF	10	(Australia) Remy Siemsen
Substitutes:
GK	40	(Australia) Eliza Campbell
DF	17	(Australia) Angelique Hristodoulou		(substituted on) 89'
DF	19	(Australia) Charlize Rule
MF	18	(Australia) Taylor Ray		(substituted on) 114'
FW	9	(Australia) Allira Toby		(substituted on) 62'
Head coach:
(Australia) Ante Juric

**Melbourne Victory**

GK	1	(Argentina) Gaby Garton	(yellow card) 120+3'
RB	13	(Australia) Polly Doran		(substituted off) 116'
CB	3	(New Zealand) Claudia Bunge	(yellow card) 74'
CB	18	(United States) Kayla Morrison
LB	8	(Australia) Angela Beard (c)
CM	10	(New Zealand) Annalie Longo		(substituted off) 109'
CM	15	(Australia) Amy Jackson	(yellow card) 44'
CM	7	(Australia) Kyra Cooney-Cross
AM	9	(United States) Catherine Zimmerman		(substituted off) 90'
AM	11	(Australia) Lisa De Vanna
CF	14	(Australia) Melina Ayres
Substitutes:
GK	20	(Australia) Melissa Maizels
MF	4	(Canada) Natalie Martineau
MF	19	(Australia) Lia Privitelli		(substituted on) 90'
MF	30	(Australia) MelindaJ Barbieri		(substituted on) 116'
FW	2	(Australia) Tiffany Eliadis		(substituted on) 109'
Manager:
(Wales) Jeff Hopkins

Player of the Match:
(Australia) Jada Mathyssen-Whyman

Assistant referees:
Lauren Hargrave
Laura Moya
Fourth official:
Sarah Ho
Additional assistant referee:
Isabella Blaess
Lara Lee

**Match rules**

- 90 minutes.
- 30 minutes of extra time if necessary.
- Penalty shoot-out if scores still level.
- Five named substitutes.
- Maximum of three substitutions.
