= 2017–18 Melbourne Victory FC (women) season =

Melbourne Victory W-League
2017–18 season
- Manager: Jeff Hopkins
- Stadium: Lakeside Stadium, Melbourne; AAMI Park, Melbourne
- W-League: 7th
- Top goalscorer: Natasha Dowie (6 goals)
- Highest home attendance: 6,045 vs Sydney FC; 26 January 2018
- Lowest home attendance: 336 vs Western Sydney Wanderers; 24 November 2017
- Average home league attendance: 2,366
Home colours	Away colours

The 2017–18 Melbourne Victory W-League season was the club's tenth season in the W-League, the premier competition for women's soccer in Australia. The team played home games at Epping Stadium, Lakeside Stadium and AAMI Park. The club was managed by Jeff Hopkins.

== Players ==
=== Squad information ===
Note: Flags indicate national team as defined under FIFA eligibility rules; some limited exceptions apply. Players may hold more than one non-FIFA nationality.

No.	Pos.	Nation	Player
1	GK	AUS	Casey Dumont
2	FW	AUS	Whitney Knight
3	DF	AUS	Alexandra Gummer
5	DF	AUS	Laura Alleway
6	DF	AUS	Annabelle Martin
7	FW	KOR	Jeon Ga-eul
8	DF	AUS	Angela Beard
9	FW	ENG	Natasha Dowie (Captain, on loan from Boston Breakers)
10	FW	AUS	Kyra Cooney-Cross
11	MF	AUS	MelindaJ Barbieri

No.	Pos.	Nation	Player
13	FW	AUS	Laura Spiranovic
14	FW	AUS	Melina Ayres
15	MF	AUS	Adriana Taranto
16	MF	AUS	Lia Privitelli
17	MF	TUR	Gülcan Koca
18	MF	AUS	Tiffany Eliadis
19	DF	USA	Kristen McNabb (on loan from Seattle Reign FC)
20	GK	AUS	Bethany Mason-Jones
31	DF	USA	Christina Gibbons (on loan from FC Kansas City)

=== Transfers in ===
No.	Pos.	Nat.	Name	Age	Moving from	Type	Transfer window	Ends	Transfer fee	Source
5	DF	(Australia)	Laura Alleway	27	(United States) Orlando Pride	Transfer	Pre-season	2019	Free	
1	GK	(Australia)	Casey Dumont	25	Western Sydney Wanderers	Transfer	Pre-season		Free	
8	DF	(Australia)	Angela Beard	20	Brisbane Roar	Transfer	Pre-season	2018	Free	
10	FW	(Australia)	Kyra Cooney-Cross	15	Unattached	Transfer	Pre-season		Free	
14	FW	(Australia)	Melina Ayres	18	Melbourne City	Transfer	Pre-season	2018	Free	
31	DF	(United States)	Christina Gibbons	21	(United States) FC Kansas City	Loan	Pre-season		Free	
18	FW	(Australia)	Tiffany Eliadis	22	(Australia) South Melbourne	Transfer	Pre-season		Free	
2	FW	(Australia)	Whitney Knight	17	Unattached	Transfer	Pre-season		Free	
19	DF	(United States)	Kristen McNabb	23	(United States) Seattle Reign FC	Loan	Pre-season		Free	
7	MF	(South Korea)	Jeon Ga-eul	29	Incheon Red Angels	Transfer	Pre-season		Free	

=== Transfers out ===
No.	Pos.	Nat.	Name	Age	Moving to	Type	Transfer window	Transfer fee	Source
8	MF	(Australia)	Ayesha Norrie	20	Brisbane Roar	Transfer	Pre-season	Free	
10	MF	(United States)	Christine Nairn	27	Unattached	Transfer	Pre-season	Free	
1	GK	(Mexico)	Bianca Henninger	27	(United States) Houston Dash	Loan return	Pre-season	Free	
16	DF	(United States)	Samantha Johnson	26	(United States) Chicago Red Stars	Loan return	Pre-season	Free	
10	MF	(United States)	Christine Nairn	27	(United States) Washington Spirit	Loan return	Pre-season	Free	
2	DF	(Australia)	Alex Natoli	21	Unattached	Transfer	Pre-season	Free	
		(Australia)	Kariah White		Unattached	Transfer	Pre-season	Free	
	MF	(New Zealand)	Kirsty Yallop	30	Unattached	Transfer	Pre-season	Free	

=== Contract extensions ===
No.	Name	Position	Duration	Date	Notes

== Managerial staff ==
Position	Name
Head coach	(Wales) Jeff Hopkins
Assistant coach	
Team manager	

== Squad statistics ==
N	Pos.	Nat.	Name	Total					W-League
N	Pos.	Nat.	Name	Apps	Goals	Yellow card	Second yellow card	Red card	Apps	Goals	Yellow card	Second yellow card	Red card
1	GK	(Australia)	Casey Dumont	6	0	0	0	0	6+0	0	0	0	0
2	FW	(Australia)	Whitney Knight	2	0	0	0	0	1+1	0	0	0	0
3	DF	(Australia)	Alexandra Gummer	3	0	0	0	0	3+0	0	0	0	0
5	DF	(Australia)	Laura Alleway	5	0	0	0	0	5+0	0	0	0	0
6	DF	(Australia)	Annabelle Martin	5	0	1	0	0	5+0	0	1	0	0
7	FW	(South Korea)	Jeon Ga-eul	5	1	1	0	0	5+0	1	1	0	0
8	DF	(Australia)	Angela Beard	6	0	0	0	0	6+0	0	0	0	0
9	FW	(England)	Natasha Dowie	6	5	0	0	0	6+0	5	0	0	0
10	FW	(Australia)	Kyra Cooney-Cross	6	0	0	0	0	4+2	0	0	0	0
11	MF	(Australia)	MelindaJ Barbieri	4	0	0	0	0	1+3	0	0	0	0
13	FW	(Australia)	Laura Spiranovic	4	0	1	0	0	3+1	0	1	0	0
14	FW	(Australia)	Melina Ayres	4	0	0	0	0	4+0	0	0	0	0
15	MF	(Australia)	Adriana Taranto	0	0	0	0	0	0+0	0	0	0	0
16	MF	(Australia)	Lia Privitelli	5	1	0	0	0	2+3	1	0	0	0
17	MF	(Turkey)	Gülcan Koca	5	0	1	0	0	4+1	0	1	0	0
18	MF	(Australia)	Tiffany Eliadis	5	0	0	0	0	2+3	0	0	0	0
19	DF	(United States)	Kristen McNabb	5	1	2	0	0	5+0	1	2	0	0
20	GK	(Australia)	Bethany Mason-Jones	0	0	0	0	0	0+0	0	0	0	0
31	DF	(United States)	Christina Gibbons	4	0	0	0	0	4+0	0	0	0	0

- Last updated: 15 December 2017
- Source: Competitive Matches
- (yellow card) = Number of bookings; (second yellow card) = Number of sending offs after a second yellow card; (red card) = Number of sending offs by a direct red card.

== Competitions ==
=== W-League ===
==== League table ====
Pos	Team	Pld	W	D	L	GF	GA	GD	Pts	Qualification
1	Brisbane Roar	12	9	1	2	21	12	+9	28	Qualification to Finals series
2	Sydney FC	12	8	1	3	26	16	+10	25	Qualification to Finals series
3	Newcastle Jets	12	6	2	4	26	21	+5	20	Qualification to Finals series
4	Melbourne City (C)	12	6	2	4	20	15	+5	20	Qualification to Finals series
5	Canberra United	12	5	1	6	24	27	−3	16	
6	Perth Glory	12	4	2	6	25	27	−2	14	
7	Melbourne Victory	12	3	2	7	15	19	−4	11	
8	Western Sydney Wanderers	12	3	2	7	13	21	−8	11	
9	Adelaide United	12	3	1	8	15	27	−12	10	

Source: A-Leagues
Rules for classification: 1) points; 2) goal difference; 3) number of goals scored.
(C) Champions

==== Results summary ====
Overall								Home						Away					
Pld	W	D	L	GF	GA	GD	Pts	W	D	L	GF	GA	GD	W	D	L	GF	GA	GD
12	3	2	7	15	19	−4	11	3	1	2	11	8	+3	0	1	5	4	11	−7

Last updated: 2 February 2018.
Source: Competitive Matches

==== Results by round ====
Round	1	2	3	4	5	6	7	8	9	10	11	12	13	14
Ground	H	A	B	A	H	A	H	B	H	A	A	A	H	A
Result	W	L	✖	L	D	L	W	✖	L	L	W	D	L	L
Position	3	4	7	8	7	9	7	7	7	7	7	7	7	7

Updated to match(es) played on 4 February 2018. Source: Competitive Matches
A = Away; H = Home; B = Bye; W = Win; D = Draw; L = Loss

==== Matches ====
Win Draw Loss

27 October 2017 1	Melbourne Victory	2–1	Canberra United	Melbourne
19:00 AWST	McNabb 6'; Dowie 63'	Report	Heyman 25'	Stadium: Epping Stadium; Attendance: 500; Referee: Rebecca Durcau

3 November 2017 2	Melbourne City	1–0	Melbourne Victory	Melbourne
17:20 AEDT	Stott 82'	Report		Stadium: AAMI Park; Attendance: 3,510; Referee: Kate Jacewicz

19 November 2017 4	Perth Glory	3–1	Melbourne Victory	Perth
13:30 AWST	Hill 54'; Kerr 65', 77'	Report	Dowie 52'	Stadium: nib Stadium; Attendance: 2,104; Referee: Katie Patterson

24 November 2017 5	Melbourne Victory	1–1	Western Sydney Wanderers	Melbourne
19:30 AEDT	Dowie 63'	Report	Halloway 42'	Stadium: Lakeside Stadium; Attendance: 336; Referee: Lara Lee

2 December 2017 6	Sydney FC	2–0	Melbourne Victory	Sydney
16:00 AEDT	Ibini 3'; De Vanna 57'	Report		Stadium: Cromer Park; Attendance: 1,644; Referee: Casey Reibelt

9 December 2017 7	Melbourne Victory	4–0	Adelaide United	Melbourne
16:30 AEDT	Dowie 11', 50'; Jeon 33'; Privitelli 37'	Report		Stadium: Lakeside Stadium; Attendance: 637; Referee: Rachel Mitchenson

29 December 2017 9	Melbourne Victory	1–3	Newcastle Jets	Melbourne
17:20 AEDT	Cooney-Cross 28'	Report	Huster 5'; Stengel 41' (pen.); Brewer 72'	Stadium: AAMI Park; Attendance: 5,533; Referee: Kelly Jones

5 January 2018 10	Brisbane Roar	2–1	Melbourne Victory	Brisbane
16:20 AEST	Polkinghorne 56'; Boureille 80'	Report	Ayres 22'	Stadium: Suncorp Stadium; Attendance: 3,981; Referee: Rachel Mitchenson

14 January 2018 11	Melbourne Victory	2–1	Melbourne City	Melbourne
16:30 AEDT	Ayres 71'; Gibbons 86'	Report	Luik 63'	Stadium: Epping Stadium; Attendance: 1,143; Referee: Lara Lee

19 January 2018 12	Western Sydney Wanderers	1–1	Melbourne Victory	Sydney
17:20 AEDT	Phonsongkham 24'	Report	Dowie 51'	Stadium: ANZ Stadium; Attendance: 2,859; Referee: Kelly Jones

26 January 2018 13	Melbourne Victory	1–2	Sydney FC	Melbourne
17:20 AEDT	Privitelli 49'	Report	Ray 4'; Logarzo 30'	Stadium: AAMI Park; Attendance: 6,045; Referee: Maddison Kennedy

2 February 2018 14	Adelaide United	2–1	Melbourne Victory	Adelaide
21:30 ACDT	Doniak 17'; McCormick 57'	Report	Cooney-Cross 41'	Stadium: Marden Sports Complex; Attendance: 719; Referee: Katie Patterson

== See also ==
- 2017–18 Melbourne Victory FC season
