= Laura Brock =

Australian soccer player (born 1989)

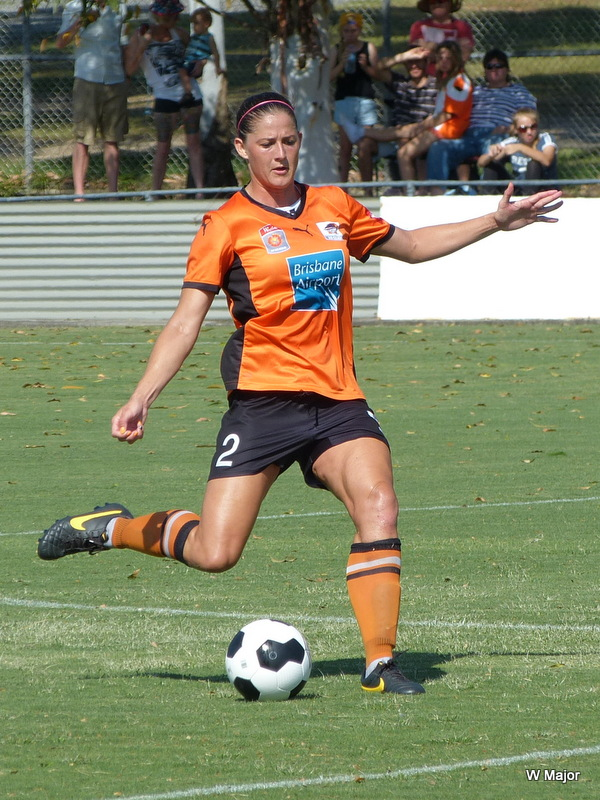
- Brock playing for Brisbane Roar in 2014

Personal information
- Full name: Laura Colleen Gloria Brock
- Birth name: Laura Colleen Gloria Alleway
- Date of birth: 28 November 1989 (age 36)
- Place of birth: Templestowe, Australia
- Height: 1.78 m (5 ft 10 in)
- Position: Defender

Senior career*
Years	Team	Apps	(Gls)
2008–2010	Melbourne Victory	17	(0)
2010–2015	Brisbane Roar	52	(1)
2012	Lincoln Ladies	3	(0)
2015–2017	Melbourne City	25	(1)
2016–2017	Orlando Pride	13	(0)
2017–2020	Melbourne Victory	28	(1)
2020–2021	EA Guingamp	18	(0)

International career
2010–2021	Australia	63	(2)
- * Club domestic league appearances and goals as of 16:22, 16 September 2019 (UTC)

Laura Colleen Gloria Brock (née Alleway; born 28 November 1989) is an Australian former soccer player who played as a defender. She made her debut for the national team in 2010.

== Club career ==
=== Melbourne Victory, 2008–2010 ===
Alleway played as a defender for Melbourne Victory in the first two seasons of Australia's W-League. Melbourne Victory finished fifth in the eight-team league both seasons, failing to make the finals.

=== Brisbane Roar, 2010–2015 ===
In Alleway's first season with Brisbane Roar FC, the team finished the regular season in second behind Sydney FC, but went on to defeat them in the Grand Final winning the title of league Champions.

The team again finished second in the 2011–12 season, but lost their Champions title to Canberra United in the Grand Final.

In January 2012, at the end of the W-League season, Alleway and Collette McCallum joined English club Lincoln Ladies for the 2012 FA WSL season. Alleway's move to Lincoln was derailed by visa problems in March 2012.

Alleway returned to Brisbane Roar FC for a third season in which the team won the title of Premiers as the highest ranked team at the end of the regular season. They were defeated by Sydney FC in the semi-finals.

The 2013–14 season saw the Roar concede the Grand Final to Alleway's former club, Melbourne Victory while the team failed to make the finals the following season finishing in 6th place. During her time on the team, Alleway was a key player for Brisbane Roar's defence appearing in 52 of the team's 67 matches.

=== Melbourne City, 2015–2016 ===
In August 2015, Alleway signed with Melbourne City in the team's inaugural season. The team finished the season undefeated winning both the premiership and the championship. Alleway played 857 minutes in 11 matches including 9 starts. The defence conceded a total of only 5 goals in the regular season and the finals.

=== Orlando Pride, 2016–2017 ===
In March 2016, Alleway and Melbourne City teammate Steph Catley joined the NWSL's newest expansion club the Orlando Pride. Orlando Pride coach Tom Sermanni gave Alleway her first cap for Australia when he was coach of the Matildas in 2010. Alleway started all five of the team's first matches before a groin-injury put her on the sidelines for the sixth week of the season.

In 2017, she played only 136 minutes for the Pride before the team waived her midway through the season.

=== Melbourne Victory, 2017– ===
On 29 August 2017, Alleway returned to Melbourne Victory signing a two-year deal.

== International career ==
=== Senior national team debut, 2010 ===
Alleway earned her first cap for the Matildas on 6 March 2010, coming in as a substitute against DPR Korea in a friendly in preparation for the AFC Asia Women's Championship. Australia won the match 3–2 with a last-minute goal from Kyah Simon.

=== 2011 FIFA Women's World Cup ===
Alleway was named to the Australian squad for the 2011 Women's World Cup in Germany. She played in only one game, coming on as a substitute in the 81st minute in a 2–1 victory over Norway in the final match of the group stage. This win allowed the Matildas to progress to the quarter-finals where they were defeated by Sweden.

=== 2015 FIFA Women's World Cup ===
Alleway started all five of Australia's games at the 2015 Women's World Cup in Canada for a total of 443 minutes of play. Australia was eliminated in the quarter-finals by Japan.

=== 2016 Olympic qualifiers ===
The Matildas came out of the qualifiers for the 2016 Olympic Games in Rio undefeated and saw their FIFA ranking jump from 9th to 5th. Alleway started in 4 of the 5 games, sitting out only Australia's 9–0 rout of Vietnam racking up 381 minutes of play.

=== 2019 FIFA Women's World Cup ===
Alleway was selected in the Australian team for the 2019 FIFA Women's World Cup in France, however she was replaced shortly before the tournament after sustaining a foot injury. She chose to stay in France to follow the team at her own expense.

=== 2020 Olympics and retirement ===
In June 2021, Brock was selected as a travelling reserve for the postponed 2020 Summer Olympics. The following week, FIFA confirmed that for the 2020 Olympics, due to the challenges of the COVID-19 pandemic, all 22 players selected would be available on the roster, shifting Brock into the squad.

At the Olympics, the Matildas advanced to the quarter-finals with one victory and a draw in the group play. In the quarter-finals they beat Great Britain 4-3 after extra time. However, they lost 1–0 to Sweden in the semi-final and were then beaten 4–3 in the bronze medal playoff by USA. Full details.

Brock announced her retirement at the end of the tournament, coming on in the 87th minute of the bronze medal match as her last game for the Matildas.

== Personal life ==
She married Cameron Brock in August 2019.

== Career statistics ==
=== Club ===
As of July 14, 2020

Club	Season	League			Cup^{1}		Total	
Club	Season	Division	Apps	Goals	Apps	Goals	Apps	Goals
Melbourne Victory	2009–10	W-League	10	0	—		10	0
Brisbane Roar	2010–11	W-League	9	0	—		9	0
Brisbane Roar	2011–12	W-League	12	1	—		12	1
Brisbane Roar	2012–13	W-League	10	0	—		10	0
Brisbane Roar	2013–14	W-League	13	0	—		13	0
Brisbane Roar	2014–15	W-League	8	0	—		8	0
Brisbane Roar	Total		52	1	0	0	52	1
Notts County Ladies F.C.	2012	WSL	3	0	1	1	4	1
Melbourne City	2015–16	W-League	11	0	—		11	0
Melbourne City	2016–17	W-League	14	1	—		14	1
Melbourne City	Total		25	1	0	0	25	1
Orlando Pride	2016	NWSL	11	0	—		11	0
Orlando Pride	2017	NWSL	2	0	—		2	0
Orlando Pride	Total		13	0	0	0	13	0
Melbourne Victory	2017–18	W-League	10	0	—		10	0
Melbourne Victory	2018–19	W-League	12	1	—		12	1
Melbourne Victory	2019–20	W-League	6	0	—		6	0
Melbourne Victory	Total		28	1	0	0	28	1
EA Guingamp	2020–21	Division 1 Féminine	0	0	0	0	0	0
Career total			131	3	1	1	132	4

^{1}FA Women's League Cup and Women's French Cup.

=== International goals ===
Scores and results list Australia's goal tally first.

#	Date	Venue	Opponent	Score	Result	Competition
1	9 April 2015	Falkirk Stadium, Falkirk, Scotland	Scotland	1–0	1–1	Friendly
2	21 May 2015	Jubilee Oval, Sydney, Australia	Vietnam	3–0	11–0	Friendly

== Honours ==
=== Individual ===
- PFA Women's Footballer of the Year Nominee: 2015

=== Club ===
Brisbane Roar

- W-League Championship: 2010–11
- W-League Premiership: 2012–13

Melbourne City

- W-League Championship: 2015–16
- W-League Premiership: 2015–16

=== International ===
- AFC Olympic Qualifying Tournament: 2016
- Tournament of Nations: 2017
- FFA Cup of Nations: 2019

== See also ==
- Women's soccer in Australia
- Foreign players in the FA WSL
