= COVID-19 pandemic cases =

Number of confirmed cases of COVID-19

The article contains the number of cases of coronavirus disease 2019 (COVID-19) reported by each country, territory, and subnational area to the World Health Organization (WHO) and published in WHO reports, tables, and spreadsheets. As of 6 February 2026, 778,999,210 cases have been stated by government agencies from around the world to be confirmed. Of the 248 recognized countries and territories around the world, 229 have reported cases of COVID-19. For more international statistics in table and map form, see COVID-19 pandemic by country and territory.

108 countries and territories have more confirmed cases than the People's Republic of China, the country where the outbreak began. Thailand was the first country to report at least one case outside China. The United States and Italy were first two countries to overtake China in terms of the number of confirmed cases. The country that overtook China in terms of the number of confirmed cases several days later was the United Kingdom. Japan was the first country in East Asia to overtake China in terms of the number of confirmed cases. The second country in East Asia that overtook China in terms of the number of confirmed cases was South Korea, while the third one was Mongolia, the fourth one Taiwan and the fifth and most recent one North Korea. The most recent country that overtook China in terms of the number of confirmed cases was North Korea, while the most recent territory was Hong Kong. Tuvalu was the last and most recent country to report at least one case. Today, 23 most affected countries have at least five million cases, incl. the United States, India, France, Brazil, Germany, the United Kingdom, Italy, South Korea, Russia, Japan, Spain, Argentina, Australia and Poland. At the moment, 45 most affected countries, incl. Greece, Thailand, Romania, the Czech Republic, South Africa, Portugal, Canada, Chile and Hungary, have at least two million cases.

The first person infected with the disease, known as COVID-19, was discovered at the beginning of December 2019. The disease has spread very easily to the United States, India, France, Brazil, Germany, the United Kingdom, Italy, South Korea, Russia, Japan, Spain, Argentina, Australia, Poland, Portugal, Thailand, Greece, Chile, Canada, South Africa, the Czech Republic, Romania, Hungary and Egypt and many other countries. The COVID-19 outbreak has been a pandemic since 11 March 2020. A total of about 6.6 million deaths worldwide pertaining to COVID-19 was reported as of January 2023. At the beginning of December 2022, the third anniversary of the beginning of the COVID-19 outbreak was commemorated. As of 6 February 2026, 115 countries and territories have at least 200,000 confirmed COVID-19 cases, and of them, 90 (18 out of 23 or nearly 78.3%) have at least half a million confirmed COVID-19 cases, incl. Egypt and Hungary. On 11 March 2022, the second anniversary of the day when the COVID-19 outbreak became a pandemic was commemorated.

On 11 February 2022, Japan, formerly the most affected country in East Asia, joined the list of 20 most affected countries, incl. the United States, India, France, Brazil, Germany, the United Kingdom, Russia, Italy, Spain, Argentina, Australia and Poland. More than a week later, on 20 February 2022, South Korea, formerly the second most affected country in East Asia, joined the list of 40 most affected countries, incl. Thailand, Greece, Chile, Canada, South Africa, the Czech Republic, and Romania. At the beginning of March 2022, South Korea joined the list of 30 most affected countries on the first anniversary of the day when it overtook China in terms of the number of cases. As of 6 February 2026, France is the most affected country in Europe, while Germany is the second most affected country and the United Kingdom the third most affected country. On 4 March 2022, South Korea joined the list of 20 most affected countries, incl. eight in Europe, such as France, Germany and the United Kingdom. On 26 March 2022, South Korea joined the list of ten most affected countries, like the United Kingdom.

The first section contains summary information: the total number of countries and territories with at least 100, 1,000, 10,000, 100,000, a million and ten million cases; the number of cases reported to WHO; the countries and territories that have reported no cases yet to WHO; and two charts showing the 20 countries and territories with the highest numbers of cases and deaths per capita. In the second section, the table has a timeline of confirmed cases of COVID-19. The number of countries affected is shown, along with the number of days taken for the number of cases to double. The table can be sorted by country or date of first confirmed case.

In January 2023, North Korea put its capital, Pyongyang, on a 5-day lockdown due to a reported "respiratory illness", though it did not mention COVID-19. Residents were told to stay home and submit to temperature checks multiple times daily. The lockdown has been lifted, but North Korea was reportedly, "yet to fully return to pre-pandemic normalcy".

== Current situation ==
=== Current situation (cases) ===
Worldwide

As of 6 February 2026:

- 108 countries and territories with more cases than mainland China. North Korea was the most recent country to overtake China in terms of the number of cases while Hong Kong was the most recent territory.
- 223 countries and territories with at least 100 cases. In some of those countries, it took 20 days to reach 100.
- 220 countries and territories with at least 1,000 cases. From 100 to 1,000, it took nine days in some of those countries.
- 198 countries and territories with at least 10,000 cases. From 1,000 to 10,000, it took ten days in some of those countries.
- 129 countries and territories with at least 100,000 cases. From 10,000 to 100,000, it took an average of 15 days in some of those countries.
- 68 countries and territories with at least a million cases. From 100,000 to a million, it took an average of 39 days in some of those countries.
- 13 countries with at least ten million cases, such as the United States, the United Kingdom, South Korea and Japan. From a million to ten million, it took an average of less than six months in three of those countries.

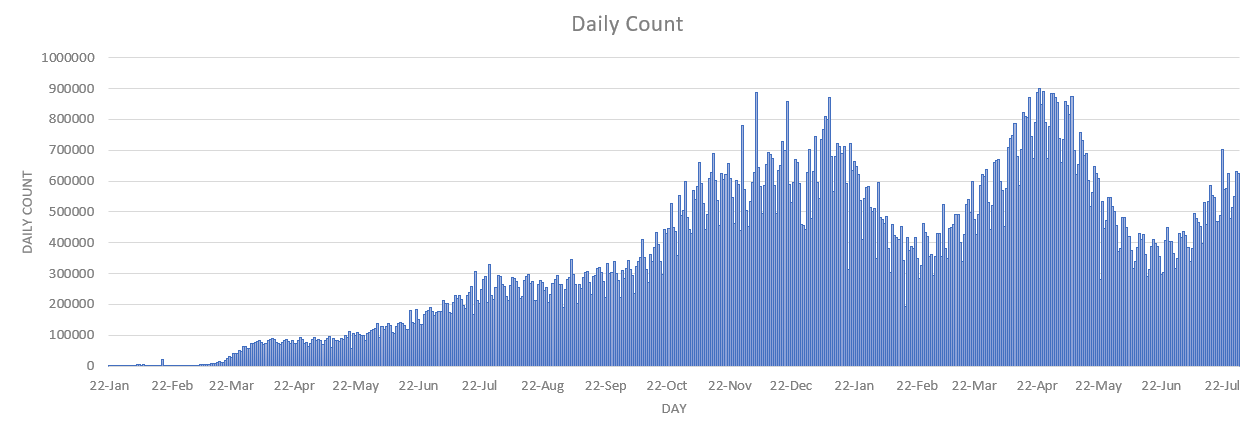
Graph showing the daily count of cases reported to WHO as of 30 July 2021

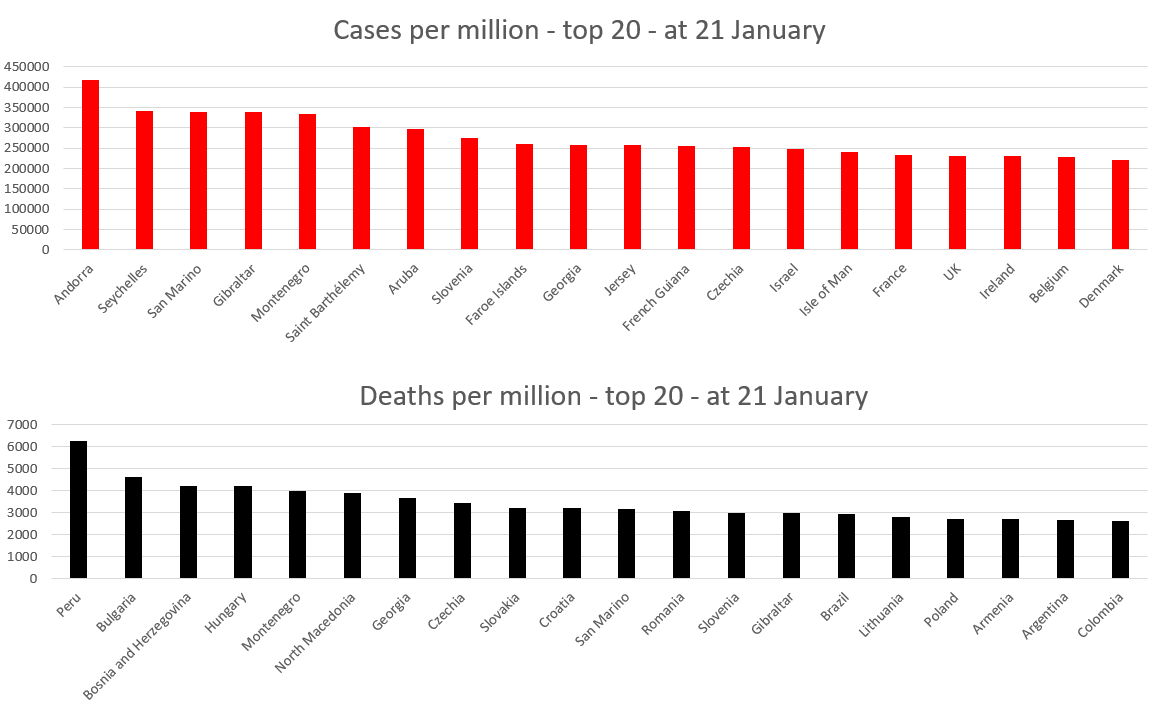
The top 20 territories in terms of cases and deaths from COVID-19 as of 21 January 2022

== Territory without confirmed cases ==
Turkmenistan has not reported any cases to the WHO, but is strongly suspected of having had infections with the disease.

== Cumulative monthly case totals by country ==
=== 2020 ===
Cumulative COVID-19 cases at start of each month
Date	First case	Last case	Jan 4	Feb 1	Mar 1	Apr 1	May 1	Jun 1	Jul 1	Aug 1	Sep 1	Oct 1	Nov 1	Dec 1
World			1	11,953	87,137	823,626	3,175,207	6,057,853	10,357,662	17,396,943	25,356,942	33,846,093	45,968,798	62,844,837
Days to double			1	4	19	8	21	33	39	42	51	63	71	70
Countries and territories			1	22	58	204	213	214	214	214	214	214	217	218
USA	January 20, 2020		0	7	62	213,199	1,035,353	1,734,040	2,573,393	4,456,389	5,936,572	7,115,491	8,952,086	13,234,551
India	January 30, 2020		0	1	3	1,636	35,043	190,535	585,493	1,695,988	3,691,166	6,312,584	8,184,082	9,462,809
Brazil	February 25, 2020		0	0	2	4,579	78,162	498,440	1,368,195	2,610,102	3,862,311	4,777,522	5,516,658	6,314,740
France	January 31, 2020		0	6	100	51,347	128,121	148,000	157,405	175,843	264,000	538,000	1,330,000	2,183,275
Russia	January 26, 2020		0	2	2	2,477	114,121	418,524	654,194	845,920	1,000,953	1,185,290	1,630,808	2,322,056
Spain	February 1, 2020		0	1	45	154,417	213,435	239,801	249,271	288,522	468,242	769,188	1,185,678	1,648,187
UK	February 1, 2020		0	2	23	25,154	171,257	274,766	312,658	303,185	335,877	453,268	1,011,664	1,629,661
Italy	January 30, 2020		0	2	1,128	105,792	205,463	233,019	240,578	247,537	269,214	314,861	679,430	1,601,554
Argentina	March 3, 2020		0	0	0	966	4,304	16,214	62,268	185,373	408,426	736,609	1,157,179	1,418,807
Colombia	March 7, 2020		0	0	0	798	6,211	28,236	95,043	286,020	607,938	824,042	1,063,151	1,308,376
Mexico	February 29, 2020		0	0	2	1,094	17,799	87,512	220,657	416,179	595,841	738,163	918,811	1,107,071
Germany	January 27, 2020		0	7	57	67,366	159,119	181,815	194,725	209,653	243,599	291,722	532,930	1,067,473
Poland	March 4, 2020		0	0	0	2,311	12,877	23,786	34,393	45,688	67,372	91,514	362,731	990,811
Peru	March 7, 2020		0	0	0	1,065	33,931	155,671	282,365	407,492	647,166	811,768	900,180	962,530
Iran	February 6, 2020		0	0	593	44,606	94,640	151,466	227,662	304,204	375,212	457,219	612,772	962,070
South Africa	March 6, 2020		0	0	0	1,353	5,647	32,683	151,209	493,183	627,041	674,339	725,452	790,004
Ukraine	March 3, 2020		0	0	0	669	10,861	24,012	44,998	71,056	123,303	213,028	395,440	745,123
Belgium	February 5, 2020		0	0	1	12,775	48,519	58,381	61,509	68,658	85,769	120,965	445,795	577,249
Iraq	February 25, 2020		0	0	13	694	2,085	6,439	49,109	124,609	234,934	362,981	472,630	552,549
Chile	March 4, 2020		0	0	0	2,738	16,023	99,688	279,393	355,667	411,726	462,991	510,256	551,743
Indonesia	March 2, 2020		0	0	0	1,528	10,118	26,473	56,385	108,376	174,796	287,008	410,088	538,883
Czech Republic	March 2, 2020		0	0	0	3,308	7,682	9,273	11,954	16,574	24,618	68,919	335,102	523,298
Netherlands	February 28, 2020		0	0	7	12,595	39,316	46,442	50,273	54,301	70,596	120,713	350,764	522,835
Turkey	March 12, 2020		0	0	0	13,531	120,204	163,942	199,906	230,873	270,133	318,663	375,367	500,865
Romania	February 27, 2020		0	0	3	2,245	12,240	19,257	26,970	50,886	87,540	127,572	241,339	475,362
Bangladesh	March 9, 2020		0	0	0	54	7,667	47,153	145,483	237,661	312,996	363,479	407,684	464,932
Philippines	January 30, 2020		0	1	3	2,084	8,488	18,086	37,514	93,354	220,819	311,694	380,729	431,630
Pakistan	February 27, 2020		0	0	4	2,039	16,817	72,460	213,470	278,305	296,149	312,263	332,993	398,024
Canada	January 25, 2020		0	4	19	7,695	52,056	90,516	103,918	115,799	127,940	156,961	231,999	370,278
Saudi Arabia	March 3, 2020		0	0	0	1,563	22,753	85,261	190,823	275,905	315,772	334,605	347,282	357,360
Morocco	March 3, 2020		0	0	0	638	4,423	7,807	12,533	24,322	62,590	121,183	219,084	356,335
Israel	February 20, 2020		0	0	7	5,129	16,004	17,071	24,567	68,492	114,702	238,452	313,533	335,919
Switzerland	February 26, 2020		0	0	18	16,108	29,503	30,779	31,631	34,933	42,069	53,162	153,728	325,770
Portugal	March 3, 2020		0	0	0	7,443	25,056	32,500	42,141	51,072	58,012	75,542	141,279	298,061
Austria	February 26, 2020		0	0	10	10,182	15,457	16,642	17,777	21,098	27,404	45,753	106,584	280,530
Sweden	February 1, 2020		0	1	13	4,435	21,092	37,542	68,451	80,422	84,406	93,615	124,355	243,129
Nepal	January 26, 2020		0	1	1	5	57	1,572	13,564	19,771	39,460	77,817	170,743	233,452
Hungary	March 5, 2020		0	0	0	492	2,863	3,876	4,155	4,505	6,139	27,309	79,199	221,073
Jordan	March 3, 2020		0	0	0	274	453	739	1,132	1,193	2,034	11,825	72,607	219,430
Ecuador	March 1, 2020		0	0	1	2,240	24,934	39,098	56,342	85,355	113,767	137,047	168,192	192,685
Serbia	March 6, 2020		0	0	0	900	9,009	11,412	14,564	25,552	31,406	33,551	46,954	175,438
Kazakhstan	March 15, 2020		0	0	0	348	3,551	11,308	41,065	90,367	131,596	140,957	150,863	173,806
UAE	January 29, 2020		0	4	19	664	12,481	34,557	48,667	60,506	70,231	93,090	132,629	168,860
Panama	March 10, 2020		0	0	0	989	6,378	13,018	32,785	64,191	92,065	111,853	132,867	164,729
Japan	January 21, 2020		0	17	239	2,178	14,281	16,884	18,723	35,836	68,392	83,563	101,146	148,694
Bulgaria	March 8, 2020		0	0	0	399	1,506	2,513	4,989	11,690	16,266	20,833	52,844	145,300
Bolivia	March 11, 2020		0	0	0	107	1,110	9,592	32,125	75,234	115,968	134,641	141,631	144,622
Dominican Republic	March 2, 2020		0	0	0	1,109	6,972	17,285	32,568	69,649	94,715	112,209	127,018	143,988
Kuwait	February 24, 2020		0	0	45	289	4,024	27,043	46,195	66,957	85,109	105,182	125,926	142,635
Georgia	February 27, 2020		0	0	3	115	566	794	931	1,171	1,510	6,640	40,727	139,343
Qatar	March 1, 2020		0	0	1	781	13,409	56,910	96,088	110,695	118,778	125,760	132,556	138,833
Costa Rica	March 8, 2020		0	0	0	314	713	1,047	3,269	17,290	39,699	74,604	108,866	137,093
Belarus	February 28, 2020		0	0	1	152	14,027	42,556	62,118	67,808	71,843	78,631	99,459	136,647
Armenia	March 2, 2020		0	0	0	532	2,148	9,492	26,065	38,841	43,878	50,850	92,254	135,967
Croatia	February 26, 2020		0	0	7	867	2,076	2,246	2,777	5,138	10,269	16,593	49,316	128,442
Lebanon	February 22, 2020		0	0	2	463	725	1,220	1,778	4,555	17,308	38,363	81,228	127,903
Oman	February 25, 2020		0	0	6	210	2,447	11,437	40,070	79,159	85,722	98,585	114,434	123,699
Guatemala	March 15, 2020		0	0	0	36	585	4,739	17,409	49,789	74,074	91,746	107,939	122,062
Azerbaijan	March 1, 2020		0	0	3	298	1,804	5,494	17,524	31,878	36,435	40,229	55,269	121,176
Egypt	February 15, 2020		0	0	1	710	5,537	24,985	68,311	94,078	98,939	103,079	107,555	115,911
Ethiopia	March 14, 2020		0	0	0	26	131	1,172	5,846	17,530	52,131	75,368	96,169	110,074
Honduras	March 12, 2020		0	0	0	139	771	5,094	18,818	41,426	60,174	76,098	96,888	107,888
Moldova	March 8, 2020		0	0	0	353	3,897	8,251	16,613	24,733	36,920	53,042	76,040	107,364
Slovakia	March 7, 2020		0	0	0	363	1,396	1,522	1,667	2,292	3,917	10,141	57,664	105,929
Greece	February 27, 2020		0	0	3	1,314	2,591	2,917	3,409	4,477	10,317	18,475	39,251	105,271
Venezuela	March 14, 2020		0	0	0	129	331	1,459	5,530	17,859	45,868	74,363	91,589	102,040
Palestine	March 5, 2020		0	0	0	134	344	627	2,765	15,232	29,938	50,541	65,262	98,850
Tunisia	March 3, 2020		0	0	0	394	994	1,077	1,174	1,535	3,803	17,405	59,813	96,769
China	November 17, 2019		1	11,821	79,968	82,631	84,385	84,588	85,232	88,122	90,402	91,061	91,921	93,577
Myanmar	March 24, 2020		0	0	0	15	151	224	299	353	887	13,373	52,706	89,486
Bosnia and Herzegovina	March 5, 2020		0	0	0	413	1,757	2,509	4,453	11,442	20,020	27,465	50,090	87,901
Bahrain	February 25, 2020		0	0	40	567	3,040	11,398	26,758	40,982	51,972	70,422	81,645	86,956
Kenya	March 14, 2020		0	0	0	50	396	1,962	6,366	20,636	34,201	38,529	55,192	83,618
Algeria	February 26, 2020		0	0	1	584	4,006	9,394	13,907	30,394	44,494	51,530	57,651	83,199
Libya	March 25, 2020		0	0	0	10	61	156	824	3,621	13,966	34,525	61,095	82,809
Paraguay	March 9, 2020		0	0	0	65	249	986	2,221	5,207	17,105	40,101	62,596	81,906
Denmark	February 27, 2020		0	0	3	2,860	9,158	11,669	12,768	13,789	16,985	27,998	46,351	80,481
Slovenia	March 5, 2020		0	0	0	814	1,429	1,473	1,600	2,165	2,892	5,690	34,307	75,814
Kyrgyzstan	March 19, 2020		0	0	0	111	756	1,817	5,735	36,299	43,958	46,841	59,443	73,178
Uzbekistan	March 16, 2020		0	0	0	173	2,046	3,662	8,627	24,304	41,994	56,997	67,055	73,094
Ireland	February 29, 2020		0	0	1	3,235	20,612	24,990	25,473	26,065	28,811	36,155	61,456	72,544
Nigeria	February 28, 2020		0	0	1	111	1,932	10,162	25,694	43,151	54,008	58,848	62,853	67,557
Malaysia	January 26, 2020		0	8	24	2,766	6,002	7,819	8,639	8,976	9,340	11,224	31,548	65,697
Lithuania	February 28, 2020		0	0	1	533	1,385	1,675	1,817	2,075	2,906	4,693	14,824	62,515
North Macedonia	February 27, 2020		0	0	1	329	1,465	2,226	6,350	10,762	14,341	17,977	31,577	61,878
Singapore	January 23, 2020		0	16	102	926	16,169	34,884	43,907	52,205	56,812	57,765	58,015	58,218
Puerto Rico	March 14, 2020		0	0	0	239	1,539	3,776	7,465	16,781	33,199	48,755	66,128	52,545
Ghana	March 14, 2020		0	0	0	152	2,074	7,881	17,741	35,501	44,205	46,656	48,055	51,667
Afghanistan	February 25, 2020		0	0	1	192	2,171	15,750	31,762	36,710	38,196	39,268	41,425	46,498
Kosovo	March 13, 2020		0	0	0	112	799	1,064	2,835	8,287	13,411	15,577	19,799	39,553
El Salvador	March 20, 2020		0	0	0	30	395	2,517	6,438	16,632	25,729	29,077	33,445	38,405
Albania	March 9, 2020		0	0	0	243	773	1,143	2,580	5,276	9,513	13,649	20,875	38,182
Norway	February 27, 2020		0	0	15	4,447	7,710	8,411	8,865	9,208	10,644	13,914	19,563	35,826
Montenegro	March 18, 2020		0	0	0	105	322	324	548	3,184	4,905	11,083	18,958	35,366
South Korea	January 21, 2020		0	12	3,736	9,887	10,774	11,503	12,850	14,336	20,182	23,889	26,635	34,652
Luxembourg	March 2, 2020		0	0	0	2,178	3,784	4,018	4,299	6,695	6,677	8,509	17,933	34,538
Australia	January 26, 2020		0	10	29	4,707	6,762	7,195	7,834	16,905	25,746	27,078	27,590	27,904
Finland	January 30, 2020		0	1	2	1,384	4,995	6,859	7,214	7,432	8,086	9,992	16,113	24,912
Cameroon	March 6, 2020		0	0	0	139	1,832	5,904	12,592	17,255	19,409	20,838	21,793	24,487
Sri Lanka	January 28, 2020		0	1	1	143	665	1,633	2,047	2,815	3,049	3,380	10,663	23,484
Cote d'Ivoire	March 12, 2020		0	0	0	169	1,275	2,833	9,214	16,047	17,948	19,724	20,692	21,331
Uganda	March 22, 2020		0	0	0	33	81	458	889	1,154	2,972	8,129	12,495	20,459
Sudan	March 14, 2020		0	0	0	7	442	5,026	9,258	11,644	13,189	13,640	13,804	17,810
Zambia	March 19, 2020		0	0	0	35	106	1,057	1,594	5,963	12,097	14,759	16,432	17,647
Madagascar	March 22, 2020		0	0	0	53	132	771	2,214	10,868	14,863	16,408	17,111	17,341
Latvia	March 3, 2020		0	0	0	398	858	1,066	1,118	1,231	1,396	1,824	5,894	17,075
Senegal	March 3, 2020		0	0	0	175	933	3,645	6,793	10,232	13,611	14,982	15,616	16,089
Mozambique	March 23, 2020		0	0	0	8	76	254	889	1,864	3,916	8,728	12,869	15,701
Angola	March 22, 2020		0	0	0	7	27	86	284	1,109	2,654	4,972	10,805	15,139
Namibia	March 15, 2020		0	0	0	11	16	24	203	2,129	7,550	11,265	12,935	14,380
French Polynesia	March 12, 2020		0	0	0	37	58	60	62	62	573	1,852	7,262	14,372
Guinea	March 14, 2020		0	0	0	16	1,495	3,771	5,391	7,308	9,409	10,652	12,072	13,097
Maldives	March 8, 2020		0	0	0	18	396	1,773	2,361	3,793	7,804	10,291	11,659	13,011
DRC	March 11, 2020		0	0	0	109	572	3,048	7,038	9,069	10,096	10,658	11,305	12,771
Estonia	February 27, 2020		0	0	1	745	1,689	1,869	1,989	2,064	2,375	3,371	4,905	12,308
Tajikistan	May 1, 2020		0	0	0	0	15	3,930	5,954	7,409	8,583	9,769	11,017	12,194
French Guiana	March 8, 2020		0	0	0	46	126	477	4,004	7,799	9,115	9,955	10,536	11,204
Jamaica	March 11, 2020		0	0	0	36	396	581	698	864	2,357	6,482	9,094	10,763
Cyprus	March 10, 2020		0	0	0	262	850	944	998	1,114	1,488	1,755	4,366	10,565
Cabo Verde	March 21, 2020		0	0	0	5	121	435	1,227	2,451	3,884	6,024	8,793	10,526
Zimbabwe	March 21, 2020		0	0	0	8	32	178	591	3,169	6,497	7,838	8,367	10,034
Botswana	April 1, 2020		0	0	0	3	23	38	227	804	1,724	3,172	6,642	9,992
Malta	March 8, 2020		0	0	0	167	465	616	670	824	1,883	3,058	6,042	9,873
Haiti	March 21, 2020		0	0	0	15	76	1,865	5,933	7,412	8,224	8,766	9,054	9,294
Gabon	March 14, 2020		0	0	0	7	276	2,655	5,394	7,352	8,533	8,766	8,968	9,191
Mauritania	March 15, 2020		0	0	0	5	8	530	4,237	6,310	7,048	7,502	7,663	8,424
Guadeloupe	March 14, 2020		0	0	0	114	152	162	182	244	1,145	5,528	7,742	8,378
Cuba	March 13, 2020		0	0	0	186	1,501	2,045	2,341	2,608	4,032	5,597	6,887	8,284
Reunion	March 13, 2020		0	0	0	247	420	471	526	660	1,679	3,993	5,659	8,054
Syria	March 23, 2020		0	0	0	10	43	122	279	757	2,765	4,148	5,728	7,887
Bahamas	March 17, 2020		0	0	0	14	80	101	104	508	2,167	4,022	6,644	7,517
Andorra	March 3, 2020		0	0	0	376	746	764	855	925	1,176	2,050	4,756	6,745
Guam	March 17, 2020		0	0	0	69	142	166	251	351	1,387	2,488	4,632	6,722
Trinidad and Tobago	March 14, 2020		0	0	0	85	116	117	130	169	1,727	4,517	5,668	6,660
Eswatini	March 15, 2020		0	0	0	9	100	285	812	2,648	4,577	5,482	5,917	6,419
Malawi	April 3, 2020		0	0	0	0	37	284	1,265	4,078	5,566	5,773	5,930	6,028
Rwanda	March 16, 2020		0	0	0	75	243	370	1,025	2,022	4,063	4,840	5,137	5,934
Congo	March 15, 2020		0	0	0	19	220	604	1,329	3,376	3,979	5,089	5,290	5,774
Belize	March 24, 2020		0	0	0	3	18	18	24	48	993	1,943	3,462	5,743
Uruguay	March 16, 2020		0	0	0	320	630	821	932	1,243	1,585	2,033	3,082	5,716
Djibouti	March 19, 2020		0	0	0	31	1,089	3,354	4,682	5,081	5,387	5,416	5,561	5,679
Martinique	March 8, 2020		0	0	0	119	178	200	242	269	596	1,543	3,818	5,486
Iceland	March 2, 2020		0	0	0	1,135	1,797	1,806	1,842	1,885	2,107	2,728	4,865	5,392
Guyana	March 13, 2020		0	0	0	12	78	152	235	401	1,234	2,846	4,143	5,376
Suriname	March 16, 2020		0	0	0	8	10	14	515	1,650	4,009	4,863	5,201	5,312
Mayotte	March 15, 2020		0	0	0	101	539	1,871	2,603	2,962	3,301	3,779	4,366	5,181
Equatorial Guinea	March 15, 2020		0	0	0	14	315	1,043	1,043	4,821	4,941	5,030	5,088	5,153
Central African Republic	March 15, 2020		0	0	0	6	64	1,011	3,745	4,608	4,711	4,829	4,866	4,918
Aruba	March 17, 2020		0	0	0	55	100	101	103	120	1,997	3,934	4,472	4,838
Mali	March 26, 2020		0	0	0	18	490	1,265	2,181	2,522	2,776	3,118	3,554	4,688
Nicaragua	March 20, 2020		0	0	0	4	14	885	2,014	3,080	3,659	4,146	4,424	4,629
Somalia	March 17, 2020		0	0	0	5	601	1,976	2,924	3,212	3,310	3,588	3,941	4,451
Thailand	January 21, 2020		0	19	42	1,771	2,960	3,082	3,173	3,312	3,417	3,569	3,784	3,998
Gambia	March 19, 2020		0	0	0	3	12	25	49	498	2,963	3,579	3,670	3,742
South Sudan	April 6, 2020		0	0	0	0	35	994	2,007	2,352	2,527	2,704	2,926	3,109
Benin	March 17, 2020		0	0	0	9	84	232	1,199	1,805	2,145	2,357	2,643	3,015
Togo	March 7, 2020		0	0	0	34	116	442	643	927	1,396	1,784	2,296	2,946
Burkina Faso	March 11, 2020		0	0	0	261	645	881	962	1,138	1,368	2,028	2,500	2,886
Guinea-Bissau	March 26, 2020		0	0	0	9	201	1,322	1,654	1,981	2,149	2,324	2,413	2,422
Sierra Leone	April 1, 2020		0	0	0	1	124	861	1,462	1,823	2,026	2,231	2,366	2,412
Curaçao	March 15, 2020		0	0	0	11	16	20	25	29	68	370	944	2,364
Lesotho	May 14, 2020		0	0	0	0	0	2	27	604	1,085	1,595	1,947	2,109
Yemen	April 11, 2020		0	0	0	0	6	327	1,162	1,732	1,962	2,035	2,067	2,081
New Zealand	February 28, 2020		0	0	1	647	1,132	1,154	1,178	1,212	1,401	1,492	1,603	1,703
Chad	March 20, 2020		0	0	0	7	73	778	866	936	1,013	1,200	1,483	1,688
San Marino	February 29, 2020		0	0	1	236	569	687	713	716	735	750	958	1,612
Liberia	March 17, 2020		0	0	0	3	141	288	780	1,186	1,305	1,343	1,426	1,598
Niger	March 20, 2020		0	0	0	20	719	958	1,075	1,136	1,176	1,197	1,220	1,548
US Virgin Islands	March 17, 2020		0	0	0	30	66	69	84	406	1,134	1,318	1,376	1,544
Vietnam	January 24, 2020		0	6	16	207	270	328	355	558	1,044	1,095	1,180	1,347
Liechtenstein	March 4, 2020		0	0	0	68	83	83	83	89	108	120	533	1,302
Sint Maarten	March 19, 2020		0	0	0	6	76	78	77	128	463	645	805	1,066
Gibraltar	March 5, 2020		0	0	0	69	141	169	177	187	285	391	693	1,014
São Tomé and Príncipe	April 7, 2020		0	0	0	0	16	295	394	871	896	911	945	991
Jersey	March 13, 2020		0	0	0	63	290	308	319	335	374	409	574	923
Mongolia	March 10, 2020		0	0	0	12	38	179	220	291	301	313	346	791
Turks and Caicos	March 24, 2020		0	0	0	5	12	12	41	107	507	686	703	748
Saint Martin	March 5, 2020		0	0	0	18	38	41	43	53	213	383	591	744
Others	February 20, 2020		0	0	705	712	712	741	741	741	741	741	741	741
Burundi	April 1, 2020		0	0	0	2	15	63	170	387	445	510	589	689
Papua New Guinea	March 21, 2020		0	0	0	1	8	8	11	72	459	534	589	656
Comoros	May 1, 2020		0	0	0	0	1	62	303	382	423	479	530	611
Monaco	March 1, 2020		0	0	1	52	68	98	99	99	141	218	359	609
Eritrea	March 22, 2020		0	0	0	6	39	39	203	279	319	375	463	577
Tanzania	March 17, 2020		0	0	0	19	480	509	509	509	509	509	509	509
Mauritius	March 19, 2020		0	0	0	143	332	335	341	344	356	381	441	504
Faroe Islands	March 8, 2020		0	0	0	169	187	187	187	225	411	467	495	503
Bhutan	March 6, 2020		0	0	0	4	7	43	77	101	225	282	349	410
Isle of Man	March 21, 2020		0	0	0	52	311	336	336	336	336	340	353	369
Cambodia	January 28, 2020		0	1	1	109	122	125	141	239	274	277	291	326
Guernsey	March 10, 2020		0	0	0	60	251	252	252	252	252	256	267	286
Barbados	March 19, 2020		0	0	0	33	80	92	97	110	173	190	236	276
Cayman Islands	March 14, 2020		0	0	0	12	73	141	199	203	205	211	240	274
Bermuda	March 19, 2020		0	0	0	27	111	140	146	156	169	181	199	260
Saint Lucia	March 16, 2020		0	0	0	9	17	18	19	25	26	27	78	257
Seychelles	March 16, 2020		0	0	0	8	11	11	81	114	135	142	154	172
Caribbean Netherlands	April 4, 2020		0	0	0	0	6	7	7	11	16	116	153	162
Saint Barthélemy	March 5, 2020		0	0	0	6	6	6	6	8	18	48	89	152
Brunei	March 10, 2020		0	0	0	129	138	141	141	141	144	146	148	150
Antigua and Barbuda	March 14, 2020		0	0	0	7	24	25	66	91	94	101	127	141
Northern Mariana Islands	March 29, 2020		0	0	0	2	14	22	30	42	56	70	96	106
Saint Vincent and the Grenadines	March 13, 2020		0	0	0	1	16	26	29	54	60	64	74	85
Dominica	March 24, 2020		0	0	0	11	16	16	18	18	20	30	50	85
British Virgin Islands	March 27, 2020		0	0	0	3	6	8	8	8	47	71	72	73
Antarctica	December 21, 2020		0	0	0	0	0	0	0	0	0	0	0	59
Fiji	March 20, 2020		0	0	0	5	18	18	18	27	28	32	34	42
Grenada	March 23, 2020		0	0	0	9	20	23	23	24	24	24	28	41
Laos	March 25, 2020		0	0	0	9	19	19	19	20	22	23	24	39
New Caledonia	March 20, 2020		0	0	0	16	18	19	21	22	23	27	28	33
Timor-Leste	March 21, 2020		0	0	0	1	24	24	24	24	27	28	30	30
Vatican City	March 7, 2020		0	0	0	6	11	12	12	12	12	12	26	26
Saint Kitts and Nevis	March 26, 2020		0	0	0	8	15	15	15	17	17	19	19	22
Greenland	March 18, 2020		0	0	0	10	11	13	13	14	14	14	17	18
Falkland Islands	April 5, 2020		0	0	0	0	13	13	13	13	13	13	13	17
Solomon Islands	October 4, 2020		0	0	0	0	0	0	0	0	0	0	8	17
Saint Pierre and Miquelon	April 8, 2020		0	0	0	0	1	1	1	4	5	16	16	14
Montserrat	March 19, 2020		0	0	0	5	11	11	11	13	13	13	13	13
Anguilla	March 27, 2020		0	0	0	2	3	3	3	3	3	3	3	6
British Indian Ocean Territory	November 2020		0	0	0	0	0	0	0	0	0	0	2	5
Marshall Islands	October 28, 2020		0	0	0	0	0	0	0	0	0	0	1	4
Wallis and Futuna	October 19, 2020		0	0	0	0	0	0	0	0	0	0	1	3
American Samoa	November 9, 2020		0	0	0	0	0	0	0	0	0	0	0	3
Samoa	November 18, 2020		0	0	0	0	0	0	0	0	0	0	0	2
Vanuatu	November 11, 2020		0	0	0	0	0	0	0	0	0	0	0	1

=== 2021 ===
Cumulative COVID-19 cases at start of each month
Date	First case	Last case	Jan 1	Feb 1	Mar 1	Apr 1	May 1	Jun 1	Jul 1	Aug 1	Sep 1	Oct 1	Nov 1	Dec 1
World			81,963,694	102,593,717	113,793,180	128,575,654	150,989,419	170,448,610	181,967,904	197,882,160	217,734,504	233,678,071	246,693,366	262,275,617
Days to double			74	80	95	113	126	139	164	185				
Countries and territories			222	223	223	223	223	223	223	223	224	225	226	226
USA	January 23, 2020		19,346,790	25,817,939	28,244,591	30,095,776	31,948,761	32,938,999	33,333,002	34,766,907	38,936,362	43,092,756	45,665,262	48,162,778
India	January 30, 2020		10,286,709	10,757,610	11,112,241	12,221,665	19,164,969	28,175,044	30,411,634	31,655,824	32,810,845	33,766,707	34,285,814	34,596,776
Brazil	February 27, 2020		7,619,200	9,176,975	10,517,232	12,658,109	14,590,678	16,515,120	18,513,305	19,880,273	20,752,281	21,399,546	21,804,094	22,084,749
UK	February 1, 2020		2,488,784	3,817,180	4,176,558	4,345,792	4,416,627	4,487,343	4,800,911	5,856,532	6,789,585	7,807,040	9,057,633	10,228,776
Russia	February 1, 2020		3,186,336	3,868,087	4,257,650	4,554,264	4,814,558	5,081,417	5,538,142	6,288,677	6,937,333	7,535,548	8,554,192	9,669,718
Turkey	March 12, 2020		1,394,314	2,477,463	2,701,588	3,317,182	4,820,591	5,249,404	5,425,652	5,727,045	6,388,331	7,154,070	8,032,988	8,795,588
France	January 26, 2020		2,576,420	3,145,586	3,690,421	4,569,698	5,529,820	5,567,152	5,664,509	5,992,406	6,572,899	6,798,954	6,943,572	7,441,114
Iran	February 6, 2020		1,225,143	1,417,999	1,631,169	1,885,564	2,499,077	2,913,136	3,204,557	3,871,008	4,992,063	5,587,040	5,924,638	6,117,445
Germany	January 28, 2020		1,742,661	2,221,971	2,447,068	2,833,173	3,400,532	3,682,911	3,729,033	3,771,262	3,956,387	4,237,619	4,607,208	5,903,999
Argentina	March 4, 2020		1,613,928	1,922,264	2,107,365	2,332,765	2,954,943	3,753,609	4,447,701	4,919,408	5,178,889	5,256,902	5,288,807	5,328,416
Spain	February 1, 2020		1,893,502	2,705,001	3,127,521	3,291,394	3,514,942	3,681,414	3,821,662	4,496,215	4,875,401	4,965,332	5,016,330	5,169,378
Colombia	March 7, 2020		1,626,461	2,086,806	2,248,135	2,397,731	2,841,934	3,383,279	4,213,074	4,776,291	4,907,264	4,955,848	5,000,677	5,067,348
Italy	January 31, 2020		2,107,166	2,553,032	2,925,265	3,584,899	4,022,653	4,217,821	4,259,909	4,350,028	4,540,799	4,673,019	4,772,703	5,028,547
Indonesia	March 2, 2020		743,198	1,078,314	1,334,634	1,511,712	1,668,368	1,821,703	2,203,108	3,440,396	4,100,138	4,216,728	4,244,761	4,256,687
Mexico	February 29, 2020		1,413,935	1,857,230	2,084,128	2,232,910	2,340,934	2,412,810	2,513,164	2,829,443	3,422,586	3,698,542	3,821,710	3,895,335
Poland	March 4, 2020		1,305,774	1,515,889	1,711,772	2,356,970	2,798,617	2,872,868	2,880,010	2,883,029	2,889,412	2,908,817	3,030,482	3,569,096
Ukraine	March 4, 2020		1,064,479	1,221,485	1,352,134	1,691,737	2,078,086	2,204,631	2,235,801	2,253,269	2,288,371	2,435,413	2,936,238	3,450,341
South Africa	March 6, 2020		1,057,561	1,453,761	1,513,393	1,548,157	1,581,210	1,665,617	1,973,972	2,447,454	2,777,659	2,902,672	2,922,116	2,968,052
Philippines	January 30, 2020		474,064	525,618	576,352	747,267	1,037,460	1,230,290	1,412,542	1,588,954	1,989,739	2,549,921	2,787,258	2,832,538
Netherlands	February 28, 2020		797,516	978,383	1,088,526	1,272,529	1,496,352	1,649,107	1,684,916	1,865,338	1,940,769	2,002,887	2,131,829	2,642,399
Malaysia	January 26, 2020		113,010	214,959	300,752	345,500	408,713	572,357	751,979	1,113,272	1,746,254	2,245,695	2,471,642	2,632,782
Peru	March 7, 2020		1,012,614	1,133,022	1,323,863	1,540,077	1,791,998	1,955,469	2,052,065	2,109,294	2,149,591	2,175,305	2,200,908	2,234,970
Czech Republic	March 2, 2020		732,022	987,329	1,240,051	1,539,617	1,632,932	1,661,780	1,667,565	1,673,743	1,681,141	1,694,122	1,767,395	2,173,679
Thailand	January 21, 2020		6,884	19,618	26,031	28,863	67,044	162,022	264,834	615,314	1,219,531	1,615,229	1,920,189	2,120,758
Iraq	February 25, 2020		595,291	619,636	695,489	850,924	1,065,199	1,201,352	1,345,904	1,626,599	1,888,150	2,003,303	2,055,248	2,081,172
Belgium	February 5, 2020		648,288	711,417	773,110	890,413	990,229	1,064,502	1,088,465	1,128,639	1,180,365	1,240,057	1,376,674	1,793,158
Canada	January 27, 2020		572,982	775,048	864,196	976,598	1,211,083	1,378,971	1,414,736	1,430,483	1,496,256	1,620,137	1,714,503	1,790,142
Romania	February 27, 2020		632,263	728,743	801,994	952,803	1,055,265	1,077,737	1,080,823	1,083,341	1,098,765	1,233,668	1,648,031	1,779,667
Chile	March 4, 2020		608,973	727,109	825,625	995,538	1,198,245	1,384,346	1,555,902	1,615,771	1,638,675	1,654,264	1,695,048	1,762,751
Japan	January 21, 2020		234,395	389,518	432,773	474,773	591,602	746,713	799,978	925,823	1,486,153	1,701,309	1,722,864	1,727,304
Bangladesh	March 9, 2020		513,510	535,139	546,216	611,295	759,132	800,540	921,559	1,264,328	1,503,680	1,556,758	1,569,753	1,576,566
Israel	February 22, 2020		419,778	640,419	773,956	832,780	838,481	839,483	842,169	876,502	1,077,113	1,284,155	1,329,148	1,344,071
Pakistan	February 27, 2020		479,715	544,813	579,973	667,957	820,823	921,053	957,371	1,029,811	1,160,119	1,245,127	1,273,078	1,284,840
Serbia	March 6, 2020		337,923	395,263	459,259	600,596	689,557	712,472	716,562	721,918	762,933	941,989	1,142,749	1,254,845
Vietnam	January 24, 2020		1,465	1,819	2,448	2,603	2,928	7,432	17,052	150,060	462,092	790,755	921,122	1,238,082
Sweden	February 1, 2020		437,379	566,957	664,992	804,899	973,604	1,070,910	1,090,100	1,100,759	1,126,614	1,152,798	1,173,273	1,204,808
Austria	February 26, 2020		359,362	410,985	456,112	542,668	614,959	640,680	645,984	654,701	683,862	739,558	827,820	1,156,133
Portugal	March 3, 2020		413,678	720,516	804,562	821,722	836,493	849,093	879,557	968,631	1,037,927	1,069,279	1,090,651	1,147,249
Hungary	March 5, 2020		325,278	368,710	432,925	661,721	781,299	804,712	808,160	809,491	812,531	823,384	874,630	1,114,260
Kazakhstan	March 15, 2020		202,159	235,844	263,396	299,626	375,637	444,377	485,352	649,207	863,581	962,842	1,020,264	1,054,972
Switzerland	February 26, 2020		450,075	522,523	555,029	601,048	656,952	692,694	700,100	716,216	781,084	838,759	874,181	1,026,649
Cuba	March 13, 2020		11,863	26,686	49,779	75,263	106,707	142,266	190,993	384,596	652,855	877,428	952,001	962,486
Jordan	March 3, 2020		294,494	326,855	391,090	611,577	711,373	736,534	751,404	770,712	797,126	823,919	862,541	953,943
Morocco	March 3, 2020		439,193	471,157	483,654	496,097	511,249	519,216	531,361	623,528	860,948	933,071	946,145	949,917
Greece	February 27, 2020		138,850	156,957	191,100	263,689	345,033	402,306	422,456	494,942	588,569	655,767	742,170	938,903
Georgia	February 27, 2020		228,410	258,351	270,918	282,260	311,457	345,196	367,058	422,188	553,697	614,763	721,388	850,102
Nepal	January 26, 2020		260,593	270,959	274,143	277,309	323,187	561,302	640,662	697,370	764,295	795,959	813,011	821,651
UAE	January 29, 2020		207,822	303,609	391,524	461,444	520,236	570,836	632,907	680,858	718,370	735,992	739,905	742,041
Tunisia	March 3, 2020		139,140	208,885	233,277	254,018	309,119	345,474	420,103	592,881	666,168	707,190	712,747	717,572
Bulgaria	March 8, 2020		202,266	218,748	247,038	342,633	404,380	418,577	421,829	425,054	455,742	502,162	602,492	695,057
Slovakia	March 7, 2020		184,508	250,357	308,925	362,489	382,720	389,866	391,659	392,704	395,122	413,723	485,629	689,618
Lebanon	February 22, 2020		181,503	301,052	375,033	468,400	526,578	540,388	544,866	561,380	602,266	624,230	642,024	670,656
Belarus	February 28, 2020		194,284	248,336	287,306	321,807	358,738	394,439	417,189	446,040	481,532	538,086	600,168	654,718
Guatemala	March 15, 2020		138,012	159,504	174,542	194,398	227,671	254,417	293,583	368,484	470,277	560,315	601,402	617,984
Croatia	February 26, 2020		212,007	232,520	243,064	274,054	332,183	356,181	359,975	363,758	373,998	404,790	470,348	608,205
Azerbaijan	March 1, 2020		218,700	230,219	234,537	261,713	319,109	333,956	336,047	343,849	424,891	483,902	531,370	588,318
Ireland	March 1, 2020		91,779	196,547	219,592	235,854	248,870	261,872	272,183	300,976	350,015	391,573	447,317	570,115
Costa Rica	March 8, 2020		168,114	193,276	204,706	216,764	248,382	317,845	366,161	406,814	461,145	530,113	560,118	566,921
Sri Lanka	January 28, 2020		43,299	64,157	83,242	92,706	108,146	186,364	260,972	311,349	444,130	518,775	541,639	564,733
Saudi Arabia	March 3, 2020		362,741	368,074	377,383	390,007	417,363	450,436	487,592	525,730	544,449	547,134	548,617	549,752
Bolivia	March 11, 2020		158,372	215,397	248,547	271,419	303,732	368,474	437,623	472,813	490,467	500,090	513,584	537,559
Ecuador	March 1, 2020		212,512	250,828	286,155	328,755	381,862	426,037	458,504	487,372	501,201	509,613	517,202	526,870
Myanmar	March 24, 2020		124,630	140,145	141,896	142,434	142,817	143,629	159,347	302,665	402,640	465,922	500,950	522,825
Denmark	February 27, 2020		163,479	198,472	211,195	230,603	251,428	281,227	293,677	316,807	345,360	357,894	388,777	495,521
Panama	March 10, 2020		242,744	319,453	340,445	354,604	364,218	377,776	402,581	434,460	457,037	466,851	472,534	477,608
Lithuania	February 28, 2020		143,903	182,893	199,398	217,005	248,655	274,776	278,809	283,016	299,454	333,457	410,745	472,383
Paraguay	March 9, 2020		106,958	132,548	158,537	212,691	276,865	352,688	421,589	452,085	458,455	459,948	461,006	463,001
Palestine	March 5, 2020		155,365	178,919	208,349	270,878	325,303	337,191	343,008	345,702	371,582	434,072	453,782	460,799
South Korea	January 21, 2020		61,769	78,508	90,027	103,636	122,634	140,799	157,722	199,787	253,440	313,772	366,385	452,346
Venezuela	March 14, 2020		113,121	126,323	138,739	159,149	196,386	232,800	271,679	304,726	334,343	367,672	406,239	431,296
Slovenia	March 5, 2020		123,950	166,836	190,081	215,622	240,292	253,724	257,339	259,218	267,223	293,402	335,906	420,958
Kuwait	February 24, 2020		150,584	165,257	190,852	232,103	273,991	309,222	356,687	397,831	409,860	411,655	412,678	413,362
Dominican Republic	March 2, 2020		170,785	214,060	239,617	252,727	266,561	292,786	325,221	341,905	350,173	358,455	381,667	407,251
Uruguay	March 16, 2020		18,480	41,181	57,362	102,461	195,734	291,488	368,178	381,364	384,778	388,822	393,718	399,504
Mongolia	March 10, 2020		1,215	1,779	2,907	8,447	35,979	58,439	115,478	165,147	217,741	306,798	360,512	382,277
Honduras	March 12, 2020		121,827	147,100	169,754	188,514	211,076	237,581	262,069	297,111	338,757	365,994	375,381	377,888
Libya	March 25, 2020		100,277	118,631	133,338	158,957	177,508	185,776	193,474	249,114	308,972	340,084	357,338	372,636
Ethiopia	March 14, 2020		124,264	137,650	159,072	206,589	257,442	271,541	276,037	280,365	308,134	345,674	365,167	371,536
Moldova	March 8, 2020		144,818	159,804	185,453	230,241	250,837	255,186	256,734	259,478	267,526	294,392	337,768	363,774
Egypt	February 15, 2020		138,062	165,951	182,424	202,131	227,552	262,650	281,282	284,262	288,441	304,524	331,017	358,578
Armenia	March 2, 2020		158,722	167,088	172,216	193,736	216,596	222,778	225,221	230,339	242,750	262,631	309,397	339,020
Oman	February 25, 2020		128,867	134,326	141,496	159,218	193,253	217,224	268,545	296,570	302,300	303,769	304,291	304,554
Bahrain	February 25, 2020		92,675	103,057	122,395	144,445	176,934	240,532	265,827	269,186	272,540	275,057	276,829	277,690
Bosnia and Herzegovina	March 5, 2020		111,643	122,086	132,138	169,626	198,461	204,012	205,022	205,722	213,853	234,775	254,046	275,065
Norway	February 27, 2020		48,278	62,793	70,034	95,208	112,540	124,780	131,315	137,127	161,863	189,832	208,128	271,432
Singapore	January 23, 2020		58,599	59,536	59,936	60,381	61,145	62,051	62,579	64,981	67,620	96,521	198,374	264,725
Kenya	March 14, 2020		96,458	100,773	105,973	134,058	159,318	170,735	184,161	203,213	235,863	249,434	253,310	255,088
Latvia	March 3, 2020		40,904	66,241	86,186	102,363	118,558	133,199	137,429	138,863	142,637	158,291	219,139	253,659
Qatar	March 1, 2020		143,834	151,335	163,664	179,964	205,652	217,458	222,071	226,239	232,744	236,643	239,247	243,447
Estonia	February 27, 2020		28,406	44,575	66,628	107,253	122,450	129,675	131,085	133,685	142,363	156,986	195,382	223,171
North Macedonia	February 27, 2020		83,329	92,693	102,787	130,022	152,367	155,272	155,684	156,380	176,494	191,408	202,552	215,582
Nigeria	February 28, 2020		87,510	131,242	155,657	162,891	165,110	166,518	167,618	173,908	191,805	205,765	211,961	214,218
Algeria	February 26, 2020		99,610	107,339	113,092	117,192	122,108	129,013	139,626	171,392	196,080	203,359	206,452	210,531
Australia	January 26, 2020		28,408	28,811	28,970	29,304	29,801	30,106	30,610	34,127	53,829	105,093	170,417	210,214
Zambia	March 19, 2020		20,725	54,217	78,534	88,418	91,586	95,263	154,948	195,816	206,327	209,046	209,734	210,169
Albania	March 9, 2020		58,316	78,127	107,167	125,157	131,085	132,315	132,521	133,081	146,387	170,131	185,300	199,945
Botswana	April 1, 2020		14,025	21,293	28,370	39,848	46,934	57,516	70,071	106,690	156,927	179,220	186,594	195,068
Uzbekistan	March 16, 2020		77,126	78,755	79,926	83,050	91,250	100,495	111,153	130,216	157,136	174,408	186,244	193,424
Finland	January 30, 2020		36,107	45,238	58,064	77,452	86,808	92,488	95,964	107,499	128,626	142,729	159,865	189,819
Puerto Rico	March 14, 2020		76,291	93,624	100,297	107,105	131,437	138,690	140,026	146,217	170,452	181,187	184,812	188,014
Kyrgyzstan	March 19, 2020		81,156	84,588	86,251	88,538	95,752	105,111	126,395	163,846	175,876	178,608	181,327	183,404
Kosovo	March 13, 2020		51,285	60,178	69,213	90,387	105,145	107,367	107,715	108,322	145,004	160,029	160,719	161,048
Montenegro	March 18, 2020		48,643	62,098	76,875	91,905	97,383	99,675	100,283	102,081	115,406	131,521	144,353	157,385
Afghanistan	February 25, 2020		52,513	55,059	55,733	56,517	59,939	72,977	120,216	147,501	153,260	155,069	156,128	157,289
Mozambique	March 23, 2020		18,642	38,654	59,350	67,579	69,917	70,795	76,404	122,028	146,316	150,723	151,292	151,548
Zimbabwe	March 21, 2020		13,867	33,388	36,089	36,882	38,257	38,961	49,864	108,860	124,773	130,820	132,977	134,652
Cyprus	March 10, 2020		22,651	30,876	34,707	45,864	65,909	72,457	75,860	101,946	115,598	120,273	124,445	134,473
Ghana	March 14, 2020		54,771	67,010	84,023	90,583	92,562	93,898	95,914	103,019	119,436	127,482	130,077	130,920
Namibia	March 15, 2020		23,941	33,940	38,847	44,139	48,654	55,549	89,917	118,922	125,046	127,589	128,886	129,160
China	November 17, 2019		96,762	100,974	101,920	102,762	103,622	111,523	118,572	120,722	123,068	124,673	126,078	127,938
Uganda	March 22, 2020		35,216	39,579	40,357	40,867	41,907	47,147	79,977	93,927	119,915	123,742	126,236	127,589
Cambodia	January 28, 2020		378	466	820	2,477	13,402	30,710	50,385	77,243	93,055	112,651	118,522	120,134
El Salvador	March 20, 2020		45,960	54,966	59,866	64,431	69,198	73,246	78,766	86,620	94,060	104,348	113,422	119,803
Cameroon	March 6, 2020		26,848	29,617	35,714	53,920	70,607	78,929	80,858	82,064	84,210	92,303	102,499	107,148
Rwanda	March 16, 2020		8,383	15,304	18,850	21,783	25,116	26,963	37,384	70,698	87,131	97,517	99,698	100,349
Maldives	March 8, 2020		13,757	15,841	19,793	24,079	29,835	64,396	73,931	77,547	81,301	84,866	87,915	91,750
Jamaica	March 11, 2020		12,827	15,653	23,263	39,237	45,578	48,557	50,124	52,895	68,131	83,737	89,014	91,249
Luxembourg	March 2, 2020		46,598	50,699	55,425	61,642	67,205	69,932	70,895	73,935	75,672	78,130	82,065	89,181
Senegal	March 3, 2020		19,140	26,523	34,520	38,705	40,344	41,416	43,128	62,290	72,805	73,775	73,917	73,987
Laos	March 25, 2020		41	44	45	49	757	1,912	2,121	6,299	15,015	23,846	40,271	73,738
Trinidad and Tobago	March 14, 2020		7,132	7,542	7,705	8,004	10,498	23,638	32,528	38,557	44,606	50,459	57,329	70,598
Angola	March 22, 2020		17,553	19,796	20,807	22,311	26,652	34,551	38,849	42,777	47,544	56,583	64,433	65,168
Malawi	April 3, 2020		6,583	23,963	31,945	33,551	34,078	34,338	36,126	52,347	60,494	61,580	61,796	61,916
Cote d'Ivoire	March 12, 2020		22,250	28,399	32,754	43,889	45,998	47,292	48,305	50,135	55,669	60,253	61,297	61,724
Reunion	March 13, 2020		9,037	9,996	12,416	16,586	20,381	24,901	30,583	37,231	50,346	53,241	54,668	61,188
Mauritius	March 19, 2020		527	568	610	1,034	1,206	1,411	1,898	4,214	10,676	15,776	22,460	59,903
DRC	March 11, 2020		17,374	22,770	25,912	28,141	29,853	31,651	40,836	49,917	55,146	56,997	57,564	58,305
Guadeloupe	March 14, 2020		8,620	9,156	9,968	11,512	13,770	16,874	17,539	21,125	45,393	53,106	54,474	55,080
Fiji	March 20, 2020		49	55	59	67	117	438	4,418	29,781	46,716	51,023	52,171	52,520
Suriname	March 16, 2020		6,181	8,403	8,919	9,109	10,286	14,764	21,519	25,287	28,967	41,419	48,964	50,823
Syria	March 23, 2020		11,434	14,048	15,588	18,909	22,733	24,495	25,515	25,963	27,915	34,205	43,404	48,170
Eswatini	March 15, 2020		9,358	15,711	17,014	17,337	18,458	18,595	19,084	25,979	43,371	45,924	46,421	46,656
French Polynesia	March 12, 2020		16,926	18,060	18,387	18,627	18,758	18,870	19,007	20,048	40,178	45,181	45,541	46,319
French Guiana	March 8, 2020		13,166	16,083	16,627	17,132	19,404	24,036	27,536	30,164	35,073	41,113	44,629	46,014
Martinique	March 8, 2020		6,091	6,370	6,746	7,549	10,491	11,979	12,286	22,439	37,192	41,284	43,347	45,348
Madagascar	March 22, 2020		17,714	19,065	19,831	24,425	37,014	41,342	42,194	42,733	42,869	43,597	43,626	44,330
Sudan	March 14, 2020		23,316	29,488	30,417	31,833	33,944	35,512	36,709	37,138	37,779	38,333	40,852	43,299
Malta	March 8, 2020		12,774	18,027	22,482	29,033	30,292	30,535	30,627	34,375	36,171	37,149	37,655	39,437
Mauritania	March 15, 2020		13,642	16,460	17,187	17,847	18,402	19,494	20,808	25,691	33,580	35,989	37,320	39,266
Cabo Verde	March 21, 2020		11,840	14,070	15,324	17,470	23,882	30,439	32,524	33,791	35,354	37,576	38,215	38,370
Guyana	March 13, 2020		6,319	7,581	8,550	10,192	13,106	16,910	19,959	22,458	25,403	31,638	35,548	37,825
Gabon	March 14, 2020		9,571	10,748	14,565	19,140	23,075	24,429	24,984	25,384	25,819	30,155	35,525	37,342
Papua New Guinea	March 21, 2020		780	867	1,316	6,112	10,997	15,938	17,228	17,774	18,192	20,455	29,813	35,237
Guinea	March 14, 2020		13,722	14,532	15,992	19,908	22,215	23,177	23,770	25,688	29,400	30,411	30,653	30,770
Belize	March 24, 2020		10,724	11,908	12,293	12,452	12,646	12,791	13,227	14,163	16,220	20,568	26,798	30,338
Tanzania	March 17, 2020		509	509	509	509	509	509	509	1,017	1,367	25,846	26,154	26,270
Togo	March 7, 2020		3,633	5,074	6,901	10,249	12,967	13,457	13,917	15,798	21,261	25,429	26,079	26,265
Haiti	March 21, 2020		10,015	11,533	12,448	12,762	13,056	14,565	18,737	20,245	20,942	22,273	24,032	25,296
Barbados	March 19, 2020		372	1,545	3,038	3,642	3,855	4,017	4,081	4,379	4,968	8,180	17,763	25,152
Benin	March 17, 2020		3,251	3,893	5,634	7,313	7,821	8,058	8,199	8,394	13,366	23,890	24,749	24,863
Seychelles	March 16, 2020		267	1,201	2,618	4,189	5,602	11,612	15,751	18,362	20,128	21,535	22,291	23,482
Somalia	March 17, 2020		4,714	4,784	7,257	11,398	13,915	14,662	14,946	15,403	17,466	19,980	21,998	23,016
Bahamas	March 17, 2020		7,871	8,174	8,551	9,119	10,453	11,849	12,699	14,840	18,139	21,114	22,396	22,791
Lesotho	May 14, 2020		2,577	8,278	10,491	10,686	10,731	10,831	11,416	12,908	14,395	21,262	21,635	21,779
Mayotte	March 15, 2020		5,890	8,231	17,600	19,408	20,094	19,325	19,412	19,494	19,827	20,274	20,555	20,973
Burundi	April 1, 2020		822	1,635	2,217	2,842	4,018	4,803	5,482	7,372	12,585	18,271	20,078	20,432
Timor-Leste	March 21, 2020		44	70	113	604	2,276	6,994	9,278	10,966	16,941	19,535	19,790	19,825
Congo	March 15, 2020		6,200	7,887	8,820	9,681	10,678	11,658	12,695	13,186	13,588	14,359	17,670	18,970
Iceland	March 2, 2020		5,754	6,009	6,054	6,205	6,472	6,586	6,649	8,051	10,693	11,673	13,577	17,894
Tajikistan	May 1, 2020		13,182	13,714	13,714	13,714	13,714	13,714	13,929	15,550	17,252	17,484	17,486	17,493
Mali	March 26, 2020		7,090	8,091	8,376	10,042	13,858	14,265	14,427	14,585	14,874	15,220	16,074	17,435
Curaçao	March 15, 2020		4,230	4,574	4,708	7,898	12,181	12,272	12,339	13,493	15,263	16,465	17,053	17,401
Andorra	March 3, 2020		8,049	9,937	10,866	12,010	13,232	13,727	13,911	14,678	15,033	15,222	15,516	17,185
Aruba	March 17, 2020		5,442	6,858	7,804	9,374	10,608	10,978	11,135	11,584	14,508	15,472	15,882	16,335
Burkina Faso	March 11, 2020		6,707	10,682	11,982	12,717	13,310	13,434	13,481	13,580	13,777	14,243	14,793	16,000
Guam	March 17, 2020		7,139	7,380	7,527	7,597	7,746	7,918	8,096	8,271	10,120	13,082	14,714	15,132
Brunei	March 10, 2020		152	180	186	212	225	243	260	337	2,712	7,116	13,130	15,093
Jersey	March 13, 2020		2,726	3,146	3,216	3,228	3,234	3,243	3,485	8,260	9,317	10,040	11,085	14,106
Equatorial Guinea	March 15, 2020		5,277	5,516	6,005	6,914	7,694	8,529	8,734	8,880	9,326	12,362	13,368	13,592
Djibouti	March 19, 2020		5,831	5,932	6,066	8,002	11,100	11,533	11,602	11,651	11,750	12,811	13,478	13,504
Nicaragua	March 20, 2020		4,829	4,992	5,142	5,326	5,498	5,833	6,604	7,592	9,283	11,273	12,866	13,397
Saint Lucia	March 16, 2020		353	1,195	3,356	4,238	4,534	5,067	5,292	5,581	8,155	11,459	12,559	12,989
South Sudan	April 6, 2020		3,558	3,961	7,926	10,197	10,583	10,688	10,846	11,063	11,446	12,010	12,410	12,777
New Caledonia	March 20, 2020		38	47	58	121	124	128	129	134	136	7,428	10,968	12,295
Central African Republic	March 15, 2020		4,963	4,989	4,997	5,222	6,411	7,085	7,141	7,151	11,296	11,371	11,579	11,708
New Zealand	February 28, 2020		1,806	1,947	2,022	2,145	2,257	2,317	2,383	2,517	3,287	3,935	6,233	11,351
Isle of Man	March 21, 2020		377	434	484	1,567	1,587	1,592	1,612	4,333	6,664	7,583	9,691	11,340
Yemen	April 11, 2020		2,103	2,125	2,289	4,361	6,321	6,742	6,920	7,061	7,869	9,067	9,791	10,004
Gambia	March 19, 2020		3,800	4,090	4,712	5,459	5,898	5,993	6,079	7,962	9,698	9,935	9,967	9,989
US Virgin Islands	March 17, 2020		2,031	2,421	2,646	2,907	3,116	3,465	3,858	4,629	5,864	6,721	7,204	7,511
Eritrea	March 22, 2020		1,320	2,135	2,847	3,285	3,671	4,094	6,009	6,547	6,642	6,722	6,834	7,341
Gibraltar	March 5, 2020		1,973	4,108	4,238	4,274	4,283	4,293	4,348	4,947	5,342	5,549	5,992	7,248
Cayman Islands	March 14, 2020		330	390	438	499	542	581	614	643	680	835	1,650	7,074
Niger	March 20, 2020		3,208	4,517	4,740	5,021	5,228	5,410	5,489	5,616	5,857	6,024	6,366	7,007
Guinea-Bissau	March 26, 2020		2,447	2,635	3,262	3,650	3,734	3,766	3,859	4,479	5,799	6,107	6,134	6,440
Sierra Leone	April 1, 2020		2,560	3,593	3,887	3,980	4,054	4,147	5,575	6,283	6,367	6,394	6,398	6,402
San Marino	February 29, 2020		2,384	3,025	3,716	4,775	5,066	5,090	5,092	5,143	5,347	5,448	5,571	6,096
Grenada	March 23, 2020		134	148	148	155	161	161	162	169	461	5,140	5,840	5,894
Liberia	March 17, 2020		1,800	1,939	2,010	2,053	2,099	2,191	4,093	5,404	5,594	5,799	5,815	5,823
Dominica	March 24, 2020		96	117	142	161	174	188	193	216	1,638	3,481	4,783	5,776
Bermuda	March 19, 2020		604	691	705	1,157	2,382	2,491	2,514	2,568	2,911	5,244	5,647	5,748
Saint Vincent and the Grenadines	March 13, 2020		119	901	1,556	1,748	1,884	2,035	2,225	2,296	2,336	3,508	4,951	5,525
Chad	March 20, 2020		2,113	3,376	3,973	4,533	4,817	4,929	4,951	4,973	4,994	5,040	5,069	5,107
Liechtenstein	March 4, 2020		2,221	2,567	2,652	2,761	3,022	3,103	3,133	3,190	3,403	3,558	3,690	4,870
Sint Maarten	March 19, 2020		1,434	1,822	2,051	2,140	2,230	2,414	2,614	2,760	3,679	4,283	4,488	4,584
Comoros	May 1, 2020		765	2,726	3,571	3,698	3,908	3,952	4,013	4,028	4,065	4,147	4,259	4,508
Antigua and Barbuda	March 14, 2020		159	220	726	1,136	1,232	1,260	1,263	1,303	1,715	3,231	4,058	4,141
Guernsey	March 10, 2020		298	493	821	821	822	823	837	948	1,293	1,605	2,153	4,079
Saint Martin	March 5, 2020		995	1,289	1,554	1,657	1,728	2,009	2,367	2,797	3,356	3,795	3,941	4,031
Monaco	March 1, 2020		875	1,489	1,953	2,288	2,454	2,504	2,577	2,889	3,200	3,313	3,415	3,766
São Tomé and Príncipe	April 7, 2020		1,014	1,256	1,786	2,225	2,302	2,345	2,366	2,454	2,593	3,459	3,714	3,731
Faroe Islands	March 8, 2020		610	654	658	661	664	718	776	983	1,001	1,178	2,145	3,626
Turks and Caicos	March 24, 2020		874	1,503	2,114	2,329	2,388	2,417	2,425	2,484	2,650	2,844	2,982	3,096
Bonaire	April 4, 2020		165	362	406	1,342	1,531	1,586	1,622	1,678	1,757	2,047	2,372	2,863
British Virgin Islands	March 27, 2020		93	141	153	154	194	289	313	2,500	2,568	2,676	2,725	2,809
Saint Kitts and Nevis	March 26, 2020		32	37	41	44	44	68	443	593	1,091	1,948	2,669	2,782
Bhutan	March 6, 2020		670	859	867	873	1,074	1,620	2,104	2,518	2,596	2,601	2,621	2,640
Saint Barthélemy	March 5, 2020		190	379	612	857	976	1,023	1,043	1,335	1,592	1,634	1,659	1,672
Anguilla	March 27, 2020		13	17	18	25	93	109	109	114	217	409	944	1,386
Greenland	March 18, 2020		27	30	30	31	31	40	50	119	334	576	799	1,382
Northern Mariana Islands	March 29, 2020		122	132	143	159	168	183	183	190	243	269	312	855
Others	February 20, 2020		745	745	745	745	746	764	764	764	764	764	764	764
Wallis and Futuna	October 19, 2020		4	5	9	412	453	454	454	454	453	453	453	453
Saint Pierre and Miquelon	April 8, 2020		16	24	24	24	25	25	26	28	30	31	32	84
Falkland Islands	April 5, 2020		29	40	51	51	63	63	60	60	64	67	69	79
Montserrat	March 19, 2020		13	13	20	20	20	20	20	21	29	34	41	44
Sint Eustatius	April 4, 2020		19	20	20	20	20	20	20	20	24	28	28	31
Vatican City	March 7, 2020		26	26	26	26	26	26	26	26	26	26	26	26
Solomon Islands	October 4, 2020		17	17	18	19	20	20	20	20	20	20	20	20
Saba	April 4, 2020		5	6	6	6	6	7	7	7	11	11	11	12
American Samoa	September 19, 2021		0	0	0	0	0	0	0	0	0	1	4	10
Palau	August 23, 2021		0	0	0	0	0	0	0	0	2	5	8	8
Vanuatu	November 11, 2020		1	1	1	3	3	3	3	3	3	3	5	5
Marshall Islands	October 28, 2020		4	4	4	4	4	4	4	4	4	4	4	4
Samoa	January 20, 2021		0	2	4	4	1	1	1	1	1	1	1	1
Tonga	October 30, 2021		0	0	0	0	0	0	0	0	0	0	1	1

=== 2022 ===
Cumulative COVID-19 cases at start of each month
Date	First case	Jan 1
World		287,607,885
Days to double		74
Countries and territories		226
USA	January 23, 2020	54,094,311
India	January 30, 2020	34,861,579
Brazil	February 27, 2020	22,277,239
UK	February 1, 2020	12,937,890
Russia	February 1, 2020	10,519,733
France	January 26, 2020	9,712,530
Turkey	March 12, 2020	9,481,659
Germany	January 28, 2020	7,176,814
Spain	February 1, 2020	6,598,938
Iran	February 6, 2020	6,194,401
Italy	January 31, 2020	6,125,683
Argentina	March 4, 2020	5,606,745
Colombia	March 7, 2020	5,147,039
Indonesia	March 2, 2020	4,262,994
Poland	March 4, 2020	4,120,232
Mexico	February 29, 2020	3,997,299
Ukraine	March 4, 2020	3,672,675
South Africa	March 6, 2020	3,458,286
Netherlands	February 28, 2020	3,132,193
Philippines	January 30, 2020	2,843,869
Malaysia	January 26, 2020	2,758,086
Czech Republic	March 2, 2020	2,481,524
Peru	March 7, 2020	2,292,254
Thailand	January 21, 2020	2,226,446
Canada	January 27, 2020	2,142,310
Belgium	February 5, 2020	2,125,230
Iraq	February 25, 2020	2,093,740
Romania	February 27, 2020	1,808,891
Chile	March 4, 2020	1,806,494
Japan	January 21, 2020	1,733,788
Vietnam	January 24, 2020	1,731,257
Bangladesh	March 9, 2020	1,585,909
Portugal	March 3, 2020	1,389,646
Israel	February 22, 2020	1,386,820
Switzerland	February 26, 2020	1,351,044
Sweden	February 1, 2020	1,326,364
Serbia	March 6, 2020	1,299,339
Pakistan	February 27, 2020	1,295,376
Austria	February 26, 2020	1,275,036
Jordan	March 3, 2020	1,260,983
Hungary	March 5, 2020	1,256,415
Greece	February 27, 2020	1,210,853
Kazakhstan	March 15, 2020	1,072,518
Cuba	March 13, 2020	966,004
Morocco	March 3, 2020	963,092
Georgia	February 27, 2020	936,844
Slovakia	March 7, 2020	844,393
Nepal	January 26, 2020	828,773
Denmark	February 27, 2020	817,498
Ireland	March 1, 2020	788,559
UAE	January 29, 2020	761,937
Bulgaria	March 8, 2020	747,108
Lebanon	February 22, 2020	727,930
Tunisia	March 3, 2020	726,706
Croatia	February 26, 2020	715,245
Belarus	February 28, 2020	699,110
South Korea	January 21, 2020	635,250
Guatemala	March 15, 2020	627,562
Azerbaijan	March 1, 2020	616,947
Bolivia	March 11, 2020	599,753
Sri Lanka	January 28, 2020	587,596
Costa Rica	March 8, 2020	571,481
Saudi Arabia	March 3, 2020	556,236
Ecuador	March 1, 2020	547,186
Myanmar	March 24, 2020	530,946
Lithuania	February 28, 2020	521,752
Panama	March 10, 2020	493,707
Palestine	March 5, 2020	470,522
Paraguay	March 9, 2020	468,025
Slovenia	March 5, 2020	464,041
Venezuela	March 14, 2020	444,411
Dominican Republic	March 2, 2020	418,778
Kuwait	February 24, 2020	417,135
Ethiopia	March 14, 2020	415,443
Uruguay	March 16, 2020	411,658
Norway	February 27, 2020	397,616
Australia	January 26, 2020	395,385
Mongolia	March 10, 2020	389,443
Libya	March 25, 2020	388,734
Egypt	February 15, 2020	385,575
Honduras	March 12, 2020	379,542
Moldova	March 8, 2020	376,155
Armenia	March 2, 2020	344,980
Oman	February 25, 2020	305,489
Kenya	March 14, 2020	292,237
Bosnia and Herzegovina	March 5, 2020	291,313
Bahrain	February 25, 2020	282,062
Singapore	January 23, 2020	279,405
Finland	January 30, 2020	277,672
Latvia	March 3, 2020	276,674
Puerto Rico	March 14, 2020	272,290
Qatar	March 1, 2020	250,528
Zambia	March 19, 2020	249,193
Nigeria	February 28, 2020	242,341
Estonia	February 27, 2020	242,121
North Macedonia	February 27, 2020	225,048
Botswana	April 1, 2020	219,509
Algeria	February 26, 2020	218,037
Zimbabwe	March 21, 2020	211,728
Albania	March 9, 2020	210,224
Uzbekistan	March 16, 2020	199,030
Kyrgyzstan	March 19, 2020	184,748
Mozambique	March 23, 2020	175,648
Montenegro	March 18, 2020	170,122
Cyprus	March 10, 2020	166,827
Kosovo	March 13, 2020	161,441
Afghanistan	February 25, 2020	158,059
Namibia	March 15, 2020	146,720
Ghana	March 14, 2020	141,295
Uganda	March 22, 2020	140,804
China	November 17, 2019	132,071
El Salvador	March 20, 2020	121,945
Cambodia	January 28, 2020	120,493
Rwanda	March 16, 2020	111,786
Laos	March 25, 2020	111,060
Cameroon	March 6, 2020	108,451
Luxembourg	March 2, 2020	103,768
Maldives	March 8, 2020	95,891
Jamaica	March 11, 2020	93,920
Trinidad and Tobago	March 14, 2020	91,320
Angola	March 22, 2020	76,787
Reunion	March 13, 2020	76,602
DRC	March 11, 2020	76,021
Malawi	April 3, 2020	75,075
Senegal	March 3, 2020	75,055
Mauritius	March 19, 2020	68,310
Cote d'Ivoire	March 12, 2020	68,146
Eswatini	March 15, 2020	66,109
Guadeloupe	March 14, 2020	56,515
Fiji	March 20, 2020	53,891
Malta	March 8, 2020	52,470
Suriname	March 16, 2020	52,269
Madagascar	March 22, 2020	50,279
Syria	March 23, 2020	50,278
Martinique	March 8, 2020	50,005
French Guiana	March 8, 2020	48,937
Sudan	March 14, 2020	46,911
French Polynesia	March 12, 2020	46,425
Gabon	March 14, 2020	41,798
Cabo Verde	March 21, 2020	41,732
Mauritania	March 15, 2020	41,154
Guyana	March 13, 2020	39,395
Papua New Guinea	March 21, 2020	36,190
Belize	March 24, 2020	32,488
Guinea	March 14, 2020	32,051
Burundi	April 1, 2020	30,550
Togo	March 7, 2020	30,163
Lesotho	May 14, 2020	29,652
Iceland	March 2, 2020	29,326
Tanzania	March 17, 2020	29,306
Barbados	March 19, 2020	28,565
Haiti	March 21, 2020	25,985
Seychelles	March 16, 2020	24,991
Benin	March 17, 2020	24,935
Bahamas	March 17, 2020	24,476
Andorra	March 3, 2020	23,740
Somalia	March 17, 2020	23,532
Mayotte	March 15, 2020	21,911
Mali	March 26, 2020	21,009
Curaçao	March 15, 2020	20,710
Congo	March 15, 2020	20,089
Timor-Leste	March 21, 2020	19,839
Aruba	March 17, 2020	19,719
Jersey	March 13, 2020	19,432
Burkina Faso	March 11, 2020	17,632
Tajikistan	May 1, 2020	17,493
Isle of Man	March 21, 2020	15,873
South Sudan	April 6, 2020	15,626
Brunei	March 10, 2020	15,474
Guam	March 17, 2020	15,352
New Zealand	February 28, 2020	13,746
Equatorial Guinea	March 15, 2020	13,710
Djibouti	March 19, 2020	13,656
Saint Lucia	March 16, 2020	13,570
Nicaragua	March 20, 2020	13,563
New Caledonia	March 20, 2020	12,928
Central African Republic	March 15, 2020	12,163
Gambia	March 19, 2020	10,170
Yemen	April 11, 2020	10,126
US Virgin Islands	March 17, 2020	10,106
Cayman Islands	March 14, 2020	8,818
Gibraltar	March 5, 2020	8,701
San Marino	February 29, 2020	8,379
Guernsey	March 10, 2020	8,081
Eritrea	March 22, 2020	8,011
Niger	March 20, 2020	7,365
Sierra Leone	April 1, 2020	6,983
Dominica	March 24, 2020	6,814
Comoros	May 1, 2020	6,688
Guinea-Bissau	March 26, 2020	6,476
Bermuda	March 19, 2020	6,420
Liberia	March 17, 2020	6,404
Liechtenstein	March 4, 2020	6,326
Grenada	March 23, 2020	6,181
Faroe Islands	March 8, 2020	6,005
Saint Vincent and the Grenadines	March 13, 2020	5,850
Chad	March 20, 2020	5,703
Sint Maarten	March 19, 2020	5,197
Monaco	March 1, 2020	5,167
Antigua and Barbuda	March 14, 2020	4,362
Saint Martin	March 5, 2020	4,247
São Tomé and Príncipe	April 7, 2020	3,897
Bonaire	April 4, 2020	3,326
Turks and Caicos	March 24, 2020	3,284
British Virgin Islands	March 27, 2020	3,256
Northern Mariana Islands	March 29, 2020	3,255
Saint Kitts and Nevis	March 26, 2020	2,999
Bhutan	March 6, 2020	2,660
Greenland	March 18, 2020	2,616
Saint Barthélemy	March 5, 2020	1,955
Anguilla	March 27, 2020	1,674
Others	February 20, 2020	764
Wallis and Futuna	October 19, 2020	453
Saint Pierre and Miquelon	April 8, 2020	98
Falkland Islands	April 5, 2020	82
Sint Eustatius	April 4, 2020	55
Montserrat	March 19, 2020	46
Saba	April 4, 2020	44
Vatican City	March 7, 2020	26
Solomon Islands	October 4, 2020	24
Palau	August 23, 2021	12
American Samoa	September 19, 2021	11
Vanuatu	November 11, 2020	7
Marshall Islands	October 28, 2020	4
Samoa	January 20, 2021	2
Tonga	October 30, 2021	1

== Reliability of the confirmed counts ==
Doctors and media expressed scepticism of official infection counts in some countries, and statistical analysis suggested anomalies. Sceptics of the Russian official counts included medical doctor Anastasia Vasilyeva, doctors Ivan Konovalov and Samuel Greene, and medical news editor Aleksey Torgashev. The Nexta media agency stated that it had obtained leaked administrative documents showing higher infection counts than those publicly stated by Belarusian authorities. Statistical analysis of official counts from around the world found signs of "suspiciously low statistical noise" in the officially confirmed counts of some countries, with the Algerian counts including a 28-day sequence with a strongly sub-Poissonian noise level, and 28-day sequences best modelled as having sub-Poissonian noise for the daily confirmed counts in Tajikistan, Turkey, Russia, Belarus, Albania, the United Arab Emirates and Nicaragua.

Lower statistical noise in the official infection counts is statistically associated with less press freedom, as measured by the Reporters Without Borders Press Freedom Index. Benford's law analysis of the rising phase of the pandemic per country found that the official counts are more statistically credible for countries that are more democratic, have higher GDP per capita, or have more health funding or better universal health insurance systems.

== See also ==
- COVID-19 pandemic
- COVID-19 pandemic death rates by country
- COVID-19 pandemic by country and territory
