= MelindaJ Barbieri =

Association football player

Mindy Barbieri
Personal information
- Full name: MelindaJ Barbieri
- Date of birth: 16 May 2000 (age 26)
- Place of birth: Fitzroy, Victoria, Australia
- Position: Midfielder

Senior career*
Years	Team	Apps	(Gls)
2015–2022	Melbourne Victory	66	(4)
2022	Box Hill United	18	(3)
2022–2023	Adelaide United	18	(0)
2023–2024	Newcastle Jets	24	(2)

International career^{‡}
2016–	Australia U-20	11	(8)
- * Club domestic league appearances and goals as of 28 May 2024 ‡ National team caps and goals as of 1 May 2019

MelindaJ "Mindy" Barbieri (Italian: [barˈbjɛːri]; born 16 May 2000) is an Australian soccer player who last played for Newcastle Jets in the Australian A-League Women. She has previously played for Melbourne Victory and Adelaide United. She has represented Australia in the Australia women's national under-20 soccer team.

== Club career ==
=== Melbourne Victory ===
Barbieri signed with Melbourne Victory in 2015. She made her debut on 17 October 2015 in a match against Perth Glory. She made twelve appearances for the team during the 2015–16 W-League season. She scored her first goal against Western Sydney Wanderers on 12 December 2015. She scored her second goal of the season against Sydney FC on 26 December 2015. Victory finished in ninth place during the regular season with a 2–9–1 record. In May 2016, she was awarded the club's Young Player of the Year award.

Barbieri returned to the squad for the 2016–17 W-League season.

On 20 September 2017, following the W-League's new CBA allowing multi-year contracts, Barbieri signed a two-year contract with Melbourne Victory.

=== Box Hill United ===
Following the 2021–22 A-League Women season, Barbieri joined National Premier Leagues Victoria Women (NPLVW) club Box Hill United for the off-season. During the 2022 NPLVW season, she scored 3 goals in 18 appearances.

=== Adelaide United ===
After seven seasons with Melbourne Victory in which she made 66 appearances, in September 2022, Barbieri joined Adelaide United. After one season, she departed the club.

=== Newcastle Jets ===
In October 2023, Barbieri joined Newcastle Jets. In July 2024, the club announced her departure.

== International career ==
Barbieri has represented Australia on the Australia women's national under-20 soccer team. In July 2016, her hat-trick against Timor-Leste helped set a new goal-scoring record at the 2016 AFF Women's Championship.

== Playing statistics ==
Stats
Year	Matches	Goals	Assists	Yellow card
2015–16	12	2	-	1
2016–17	11	0	0	0
2017–18	7	0	0	0
2018–19	9	0	0	0

== Honours ==
with Melbourne Victory

- Young Player of the Year
