= Polly Doran =

Australian soccer player (born 2001)

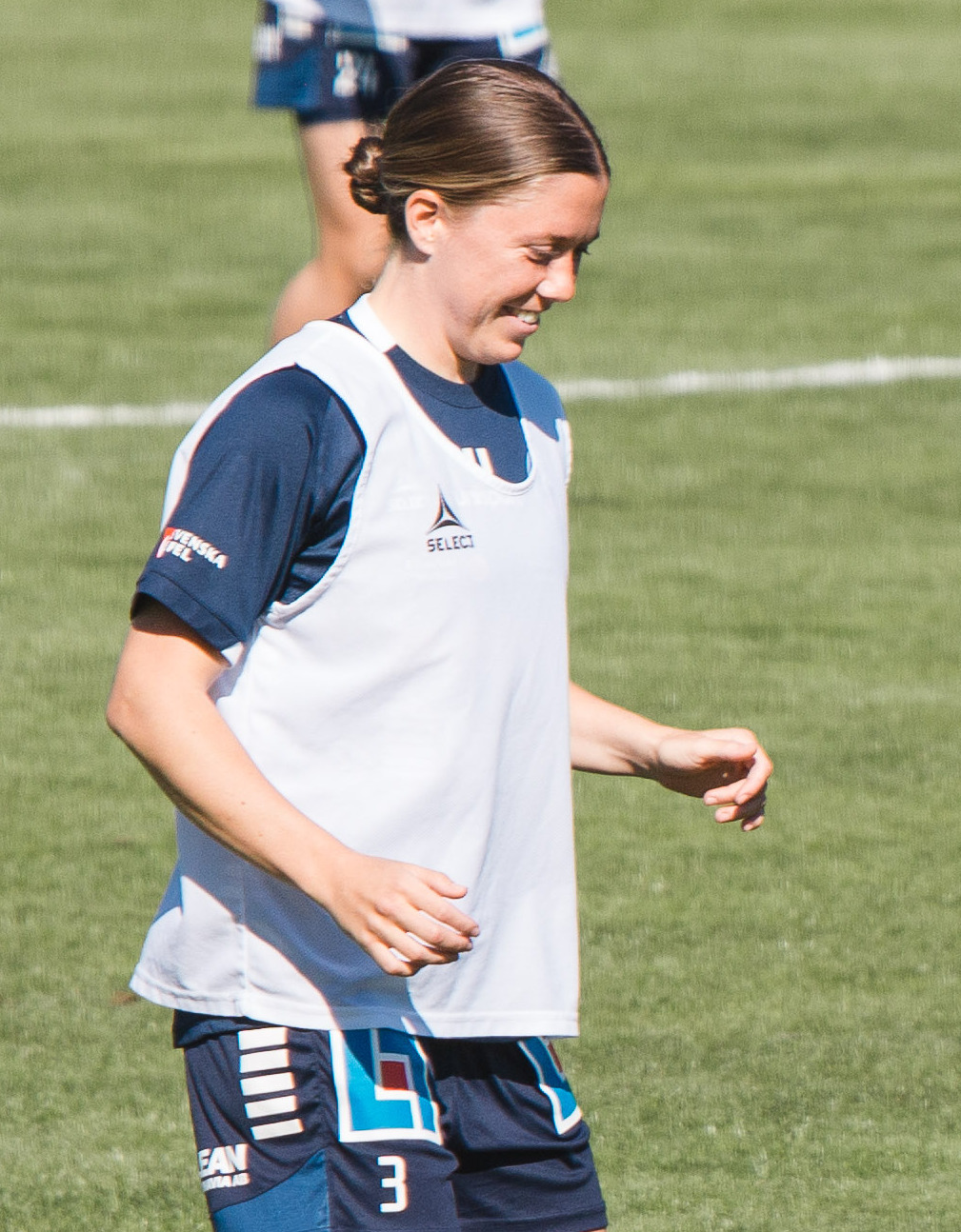
- Doran with Linköping in 2025

Personal information
- Full name: Polly Gabrielle Doran
- Date of birth: 5 November 2001 (age 24)
- Place of birth: Australia
- Position: Defender

Team information
- Current team: Linköping
- Number: 3

Senior career*
Years	Team	Apps	(Gls)
2019–2022	Melbourne Victory	39	(0)
2022	Manly United	10	(2)
2022–2023	Crystal Palace	28	(1)
2024–	Linköping	33	(1)
- * Club domestic league appearances and goals

Polly Gabrielle Doran (born 5 November 2001) is an Australian soccer player who plays as a defender for Elitettan club Linköping FC.

== Early life ==
Doran was born in 2001 in Australia. She debuted in senior football at the age of fourteen.

== Career ==
In 2016, Doran signed for Australian side Melbourne Victory. She helped the club win the league.

== Style of play ==
Doran mainly operates as a defender. She is known for her crossing ability.
