= Tiffany Eliadis =

Australian footballer (born 1995)

Personal information
- Full name: Tiffany Eliadis
- Date of birth: 7 October 1995 (age 31)
- Place of birth: Dandenong, Australia
- Height: 1.63 m (5 ft 4 in)
- Position: Forward

Team information
- Current team: Atlético Ouriense

Senior career*
Years	Team	Apps	(Gls)
2012–2013	Melbourne Victory	7	(0)
2013	South Melbourne		
2013–2015	Melbourne Victory	8	(0)
2015–2017	South Melbourne		
2017–2022	Melbourne Victory	6	(0)
2022–2023	Bulleen Lions		
2023–	Atlético Ouriense		
- * Club domestic league appearances and goals as of 20 February 2018

Tiffany Eliadis (born 7 October 1995) is an Australian soccer forward who plays for National Premier Leagues Victoria Women (NPL Victoria Women) Bulleen Lions she previously played for A-League Women club Melbourne Victory, and has also played for NPL Victoria Women club South Melbourne.

In August 2023, Tiffany was scouted through the Euro Pro Scouting Process at Olympiacos Melbourne. As a result, Tiffany successfully received a pro contract and moved to play for Atletico Ouriense.
