= Lia Privitelli =

Australian soccer player (born 1994)

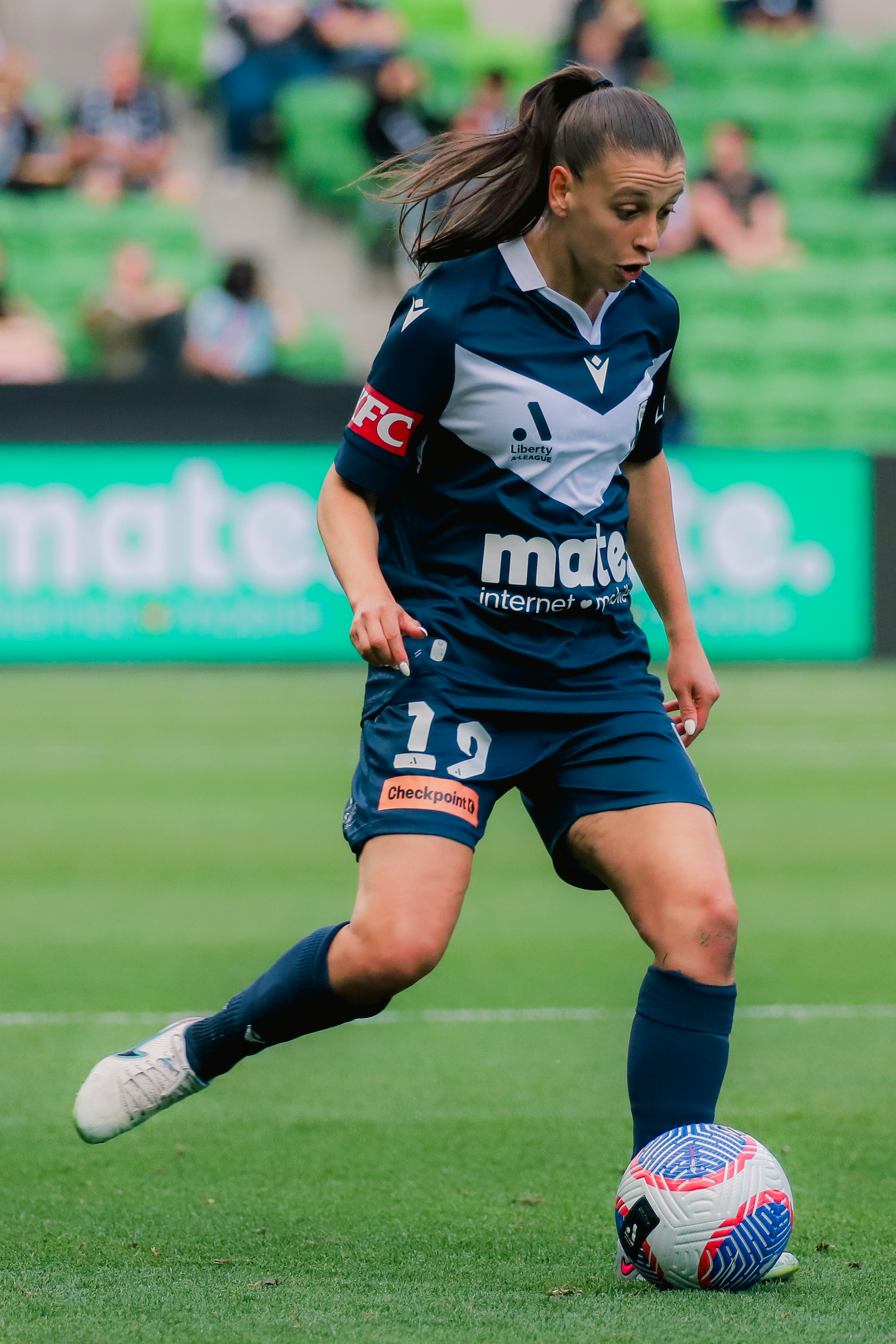

Personal information
- Full name: Lia Maree Privitelli
- Date of birth: 17 June 1994 (age 32)
- Place of birth: Australia
- Height: 1.87 m (6 ft 2 in)
- Positions: Midfielder; winger

Senior career*
Years	Team	Apps	(Gls)
2016–2022	Melbourne Victory	66	(7)
2022	Bulleen Lions	19	(6)
2022–2025	Melbourne Victory	30	(1)
- * Club domestic league appearances and goals

Lia Maree Privitelli (born 17 June 1994) is a former Australian soccer player who played as a midfielder or winger for Melbourne Victory.

== Life and career ==
Privitelli started her career with Melbourne Victory. She made sixty-six league appearances and scored seven goals while playing for the club. She has captained the club. She helped them win the league. In 2022, she signed for Bulleen Lions. She made nineteen league appearances and scored six goals while playing for the club. She helped them achieve second place in the league. After that, she returned to Melbourne Victory.

In October 2025, Privitelli announced her retirement from professional football.

Privitelli was born on 17 June 1994 in Australia. She is of Italian descent through her parents. She has suffered from femoroacetabular impingement. She has worked as a physical education teacher at Epping Secondary College in Australia.

== Style of play ==
Privitelli mainly operates as a midfielder or winger. She is known for her versatility. She is also known for her speed. She has operated as a left-back while playing for Melbourne Victory.
