= 2025–26 in Australian soccer =

57th season of national competitive soccer in Australia

Soccer in Australia
- Season: 2025–26

Men's soccer
- ALM Premiership: Newcastle Jets
- ALM Championship: Auckland FC
- Australian Championship: South Melbourne
- Australia Cup: Newcastle Jets

Women's soccer
- ALW Premiership: Melbourne City
- ALW Championship: Melbourne City

The 2025–26 season was the 57th season of national competitive Soccer in Australia and 143rd overall.

== National teams ==
=== Men's senior ===
==== Friendlies ====
5 September 2025 Soccer Ashes	Australia	1–0	New Zealand	Canberra, Australia
19:45 UTC+10	Balard 87'	Report		Stadium: GIO Stadium; Attendance: 19,115; Referee: Donald Robertson (Scotland)

9 September 2025 Soccer Ashes	New Zealand	1–3	Australia	Auckland, New Zealand
19:00 UTC+12	Wood 57'	Report	Toure 35', 60'; Irankunda 54'	Stadium: Go Media Stadium; Attendance: 18,213; Referee: Donald Robertson

10 October 2025	Canada	0–1	Australia	Montreal, Canada
19:30 UTC−4		Report	Irankunda 71'	Stadium: Saputo Stadium; Attendance: 23,112; Referee: Steven Madrigal (Costa Rica)

14 October 2025	United States	2–1	Australia	Commerce City, United States
19:00 UTC−6	Wright 33', 51'	Report	Bos 19'	Stadium: Dick's Sporting Goods Park; Attendance: 18,218; Referee: Pierre-Luc Lauziere (Canada)

14 November 2025	Venezuela	1–0	Australia	Houston, United States
20:00 UTC−6	Ramírez 38'	Report		Stadium: Shell Energy Stadium; Referee: Armando Villarreal (United States)

18 November 2025	Colombia	3–0	Australia	New York City, United States
21:00 UTC−4	Rodríguez 76' (pen.); Díaz 89'; Lerma 90+3'	Report		Stadium: Citi Field; Referee: Tori Penso (United States)

27 March 2026 2026 FIFA Series	Australia	1–0	Cameroon	Sydney, Australia
20:10 UTC+11	Bos 84'	Report		Stadium: Accor Stadium; Attendance: 23,798; Referee: Robert Jones (England)

31 March 2026 2026 FIFA Series	Australia	5–1	Curaçao	Melbourne, Australia
20:10 UTC+11	Mabil 23'; Circati 68'; Bos 71'; Irankunda 80', 84'	Report	Martha 50'	Stadium: AAMI Park; Attendance: 16,764; Referee: Andrew Madley (England)

30 May 2026	Mexico	1–0	Australia	Pasadena, United States
18:00 UTC−7	Vásquez 27'	Report		Stadium: Rose Bowl; Attendance: 78,479; Referee: Rubiel Vásquez (United States)

6 June 2026	Australia	1–1	Switzerland	San Diego, United States
12:00 UTC−7	Yengi 56'	Report	Ndoye 14'	Stadium: Snapdragon Stadium; Attendance: 6,107; Referee: Katja Koroleva (United States)

==== FIFA World Cup ====
13 June 2026 Group stage	Australia	2–0	Turkey	Vancouver, Canada
21:00 UTC−7	Irankunda 27'; Metcalfe 75'	Report		Stadium: BC Place; Attendance: 52,497; Referee: Jesús Valenzuela (Venezuela)

19 June 2026 Group stage	United States	2–0	Australia	Seattle, United States
12:00 UTC−7	Burgess 11' (o.g.); Freeman 43'	Report		Stadium: Lumen Field; Attendance: 66,925; Referee: Felix Zwayer (Germany)

25 June 2026 Group stage	Paraguay	0–0	Australia	Santa Clara, United States
19:00 UTC−7		Report		Stadium: Levi's Stadium; Attendance: 68,827; Referee: Clément Turpin (France)

3 July 2026 Round of 32	Australia	1–1 (a.e.t.) (2–4 p)	Egypt	Arlington, United States
13:00 UTC−5	Hany 55' (o.g.)	Report	Ashour 13'	Stadium: AT&T Stadium; Attendance: 70,244; Referee: Gustavo Tejera (Uruguay)
	Penalties
	Souttar (penalty missed); Irvine (penalty scored); Mabil (penalty scored); Herrington (penalty missed)		(penalty scored) Saber; (penalty scored) Rabia; (penalty scored) Salah; (penalty scored) Abdelmaguid

=== Women's senior ===
==== Friendlies ====
The following is a list of friendlies played by the women's senior national team in 2025–26.

5 July 2025	Australia	0–1	Panama	Bunbury, Australia
14:30 UTC+8		Report	King 59'	Stadium: Hands Oval; Attendance: 10,272; Referee: Anna-Marie Keighley (New Zealand)

8 July 2025	Australia	3–2	Panama	Perth, Australia
18:00 UTC+8	Heyman 54', 65'; Grant 90+1'	Report	Arauz 34'; Cedeño 83'	Stadium: HBF Park; Attendance: 10,657; Referee: Anna-Marie Keighley (New Zealand)

25 October 2025	Wales	1–2	Australia	Cardiff, Wales
14:00 UTC+0	Griffiths 55'	Report	Nevin 27'; Foord 85'	Stadium: Cardiff City Stadium; Attendance: 11,173; Referee: Stacey Pearson (England)

28 October 2025	England	3–0	Australia	Derby, England
19:00 UTC+0	Beever-Jones 20'; Bronze 40'; Stanway 90+8' (pen.)	Report		Stadium: Pride Park Stadium; Attendance: 26,544

28 November 2025	Australia	5–0	New Zealand	Gosford, Australia
19:30 UTC+11	Sayer 13'; Raso 24'; Carpenter 70'; Cooney-Cross 71'; Gorry 90+2'	Report		Stadium: polytec Stadium; Attendance: 20,519; Referee: Kim Yu-jeong (South Korea)

2 December 2025	Australia	2–0	New Zealand	Adelaide, Australia
20:00 UTC+10:30	Kennedy 19'; Raso 70'	Report		Stadium: Coopers Stadium; Attendance: 15,097; Referee: Hong Yu (China)

11 April 2026 2026 FIFA Series	Australia	5–0	Malawi	Nairobi, Kenya
14:00 UTC+3	van Egmond 5'; Kerr 41'; Chidiac 60'; McNamara 86'; McKenna 90+4'	Report		Stadium: Nyayo National Stadium; Referee: Emmanuela Clement (South Sudan)

15 April 2026 2026 FIFA Series	Kenya	0–2	Australia	Nairobi, Kenya
18:00 UTC+3		Report	Kerr 25'; Wheeler 54'	Stadium: Nyayo National Stadium; Referee: Yordanos Mulugeta (Ethiopia)

6 June 2026	Australia	0–1	Mexico	Newcastle, Australia
19:15 UTC+10		Report	Ordóñez 90+2'	Stadium: McDonald Jones Stadium; Attendance: 23,167

9 June 2026	Australia	3–1	Mexico	Sydney, Australia
19:00 UTC+10	Kennedy 22'; Barreras 36' (o.g.); Foord 70'	Report	Ordóñez 26'	Stadium: CommBank Stadium; Attendance: 18,441; Referee: Stacey Pearson (England)

==== AFC Women's Asian Cup ====
Pos	Team	Pld	W	D	L	GF	GA	GD	Pts	Qualification
1	South Korea	3	2	1	0	9	3	+6	7	Advance to knockout stage and Olympic qualifying
2	Australia (H)	3	2	1	0	8	3	+5	7	Advance to knockout stage and Olympic qualifying
3	Philippines	3	1	0	2	2	4	−2	3	Advance to knockout stage and Olympic qualifying
4	Iran	3	0	0	3	0	9	−9	0	

Source: AFC
(H) Hosts

1 March 2026 Group stage	Australia	1–0	Philippines	Perth, Australia
17:00 (UTC+8)	Kerr 14'	Report		Stadium: Perth Stadium; Attendance: 44,379; Referee: Dong Fangyu (China)

5 March 2026 Group stage	Iran	0–4	Australia	Gold Coast, Australia
19:00 (UTC+10)		Report	Sayer 8'; Fowler 27'; Kennedy 35', 58'	Stadium: Gold Coast Stadium; Attendance: 22,398; Referee: Asaka Koizumi (Japan)

8 March 2026 Group stage	Australia	3–3	South Korea	Sydney, Australia
20:00 (UTC+11)	Kennedy 32', 90+8'; Kerr 45+6'	Report	Mun Eun-ju 13'; Kim Shin-ji 53'; Kang Chae-rim 56'	Stadium: Stadium Australia; Attendance: 60,279; Referee: Yoshimi Yamashita (Japan)

13 March 2026 Quarter-final	Australia	2–1	North Korea	Perth, Australia
18:00 (UTC+8)	Kennedy 9'; Kerr 47'	Report	Chae Un-yong 65'	Stadium: Perth Rectangular Stadium; Attendance: 16,466; Referee: Veronika Bernatskaia (Kyrgyzstan)

17 March 2026 Semi-final	Australia	2–1	China	Perth, Australia
18:00 (UTC+8)	Foord 17'; Kerr 58'	Report	Zhang Linyan 26' (pen.)	Stadium: Perth Stadium; Attendance: 35,170; Referee: Supiree Testhomya (Thailand)

21 March 2026 Final	Australia	0–1	Japan	Sydney, Australia
20:00 (UTC+11)		Report	Hamano 17'	Stadium: Stadium Australia; Attendance: 74,397; Referee: Kim Yu-jeong (South Korea)

=== Men's under-23 ===
==== Friendlies ====
The following is a list of friendlies played by the men's under-23 national team in 2025–26.

==== AFC U-23 Asian Cup qualification ====
3 September 2025 2026 AFC U-23 Asian Cup qualification	Australia	14–0	Northern Mariana Islands	Xi'an, China
15:30 UTC+8	Blair 6', 21', 53', 55'; Reec 10', 13'; Alagich 17', 44'; Dukuly 36', 75'; Bozinovski 60'; Rawlins 66', 77'; Hammond 90+11'	Report		Stadium: Fengdong Football Park East Stadium; Attendance: 89; Referee: Ahmed Khalil (Bahrain)

6 September 2025 2026 AFC U-23 Asian Cup qualification	Timor-Leste	0–6	Australia	Xi'an, China
15:30 UTC+8	Paull 24', 90'; Blair 27' (pen.); Grimaldi 36'; Reec 68'; Hammond 90+3'	Report		Stadium: Fengdong Football Park East Stadium; Attendance: 120; Referee: Venkatesh Ramachandran (India)

9 September 2025 2026 AFC U-23 Asian Cup qualification	Australia	0–0	China	Xi'an, China
19:35 UTC+8		Report		Stadium: Xi'an International Football Centre; Attendance: 33,022; Referee: Asker Nadjafaliev (Uzbekistan)

==== AFC U-23 Asian Cup ====
8 January 2026 Group stage	Australia	2–1	Thailand	Riyadh, Saudi Arabia
14:30 UTC+3	Alagich 29' (pen.); Macallister 30'	Report	Sittha 8'	Stadium: Al-Shabab Stadium; Attendance: 90; Referee: Kim Yu-jeong (South Korea)

11 January 2026 Group stage	China	1–0	Australia	Riyadh, Saudi Arabia
14:30 UTC+3	Peng Xiao 43'	Report		Stadium: Al-Shabab Stadium; Attendance: 475; Referee: Thoriq Alkatiri (Indonesia)

14 January 2026 Group stage	Iraq	1–2	Australia	Riyadh, Saudi Arabia
14:30 UTC+3	Faisal 63' (pen.)	Report	Dukuly 90+3'; Macallister 90+7'	Stadium: Prince Faisal bin Fahd Stadium; Attendance: 183; Referee: Abdullah Jamali (Kuwait)

17 January 2026 Quarter-final	Australia	1–2	South Korea	Jeddah, Saudi Arabia
18:30 UTC+3	Jovanovic 51'	Report	Baek Ga-on 21'; Shin Min-ha 88'	Stadium: Prince Abdullah Al-Faisal Stadium; Attendance: 172; Referee: Fu Ming (China)

=== Women's under-23 ===
Football Australia decided to send the under-23 team to the 2025 ASEAN Women's Championship.

==== ASEAN Women's Championship ====
7 August 2025 Group stage	Myanmar	2–1	Australia	Phú Thọ, Vietnam
16:30 UTC+7	May Thet Mon Myint 32'; Win Theingi Tun 47'	Report	Furphy 84'	Stadium: Việt Trì Stadium; Referee: Yoshimi Yamashita (Japan)

10 August 2025 Group stage	Australia	1–0	Philippines	Phú Thọ, Vietnam
19:30 UTC+7	Jančevski 45+1'	Report		Stadium: Việt Trì Stadium; Referee: Yoshimi Yamashita (Japan)

13 August 2025 Group stage	Australia	9–0	Timor-Leste	Phú Thọ, Vietnam
19:30 UTC+7	Furphy 2', 30'; Jančevski 11', 46'; Johnston 44'; Murray 58'; McKenna 62'; Keane 79'; Brigida 82' (o.g.)	Report		Stadium: Việt Trì Stadium; Referee: Mu Mingxin (China)

16 August 2025 Semi-final	Vietnam	1–2	Australia	Haiphong, Vietnam
20:00 UTC+7	Nguyễn Thị Bích Thùy 88'	Report	Keane 7'; McKenna 16'	Stadium: Lạch Tray Stadium; Attendance: 16,890; Referee: Yoshimi Yamashita (Japan)

19 August 2025 Final	Myanmar	0–1	Australia	Haiphong, Vietnam
19:30 UTC+7		Report	Furphy 66'	Stadium: Lạch Tray Stadium; Attendance: 4,286; Referee: Yoshimi Yamashita (Japan)

=== Men's under-20 ===
==== Friendlies ====
The following is a list of friendlies played by the men's under-20 national team in 2025–26.

22 September 2025	Ukraine	2–3	Australia	Chile
	Dihtyar 61'; Krevsun 72'	Report (FA); Report (UAF)	Jovanovic; Toure

24 September 2025	Nigeria	3–1	Australia	Chile
		Report	Pearman

28 March 2026 Australia-China Friendship Series	China	1–0	Australia	Yiwu, China
18:00 AEDT	Yang Mingrui 31'	Report		Stadium: Yiwu Meihu Sports Center Stadium

31 March 2026 Australia-China Friendship Series	China	2–4	Australia	Yiwu, China
	Yang Mingrui 67', 87'	Source	Macallister 48' (pen.); Antoniou 56'; Dobson 76'; Tatu 82'	Stadium: Yiwu Meihu Sports Center Stadium

==== SBS Cup ====
18 December 2025	Australia	0–3	Spain	Shizuoka, Japan
16:00 UTC+9		Report		Stadium: Fujieda Complex

20 December 2025	Shizuoka Prefecture	2–1	Australia	Shizuoka, Japan
11:00 UTC+9		Report	Graoroski	Stadium: Fujieda Complex

21 December 2025	Japan	2–0	Australia	Shizuoka, Japan
11:00 UTC+9		Report		Stadium: Kusanagi Stadium

==== FIFA U-20 World Cup ====
28 September 2025 Group stage	Italy	1–0	Australia	Valparaíso, Chile
17:00 UTC−3	Mannini 10' (pen.)	Report		Stadium: Estadio Elías Figueroa Brander; Attendance: 4,919; Referee: Katia Itzel García (Mexico)

1 October 2025 Group stage	Argentina	4–1	Australia	Valparaíso, Chile
20:00 UTC−3	Sarco 3'; Pérez 45'; Subiabre 90+3'; Andino 90+5'	Report	Bennie 69'	Stadium: Estadio Elías Figueroa Brander; Attendance: 4,498; Referee: José María Sánchez Martínez (Spain)

4 October 2025 Group stage	Australia	3–1	Cuba	Santiago, Chile
17:00 UTC−3	Caputo 20', 50'; Bennie 39'	Report	Raballo 63'	Stadium: Estadio Nacional Julio Martínez Prádanos; Attendance: 2,732; Referee: Jalal Jayed (Morocco)

==== ASEAN U-19 Boys' Championship ====
3 June 2026 Group stage	Philippines	0–10	Australia	Deli Serdang, Indonesia
20:00 UTC+7		Report	Memeti 7' (pen.), 26', 41', 65', 71'; Wong 58', 61'; Nunes 64' (pen.); Macallister 70', 82'	Stadium: Madya Stadium; Referee: Ryo Tanimoto (Japan)

9 June 2026 Group stage	Australia	2–2	Cambodia	Deli Serdang, Indonesia
20:00 UTC+7	Neil 3'; Nunes 18'	Report	Sokea 59'; Marinucci 82' (o.g.)	Stadium: Madya Stadium; Referee: Zakaria Ismail (Malaysia)

11 June 2026 Semi-final	Indonesia	0–1	Australia	Deli Serdang, Indonesia
20:15 UTC+7		Report	Neill 89'	Stadium: North Sumatra Stadium; Referee: Alimardon Bainazarov (Kyrgyzstan)

13 June 2026 Final	Thailand	0–2	Australia	Deli Serdang, Indonesia
20:15 UTC+7		Report	Garbowski 41'; Baker 90+7'	Stadium: North Sumatra Stadium

=== Women's under-20 ===
==== Friendlies ====
The following is a list of friendlies played by the women's under-20 national team in 2025–26.

28 November 2025	Australia	1–0	South Korea	Canberra, Australia
	Halmarick 41'	Report (FA); Report (KFA)		Stadium: Australian Institute of Sport; Attendance: 0 (behind closed doors)

30 November 2025	Australia	4–1	South Korea	Canberra, Australia
	Prakash 27'; Allan 61'; Kuilamu 73'; Galic 90+3'	Report (FA); Report (KFA)	Lee Hae-nae 41'	Stadium: Australian Institute of Sport; Attendance: 0 (behind closed doors)

20 May 2026	Australia	1–1	New Zealand	Canberra, Australia
	Trimis	Report	Bangalan 85'	Stadium: Australian Institute of Sport; Attendance: 0 (behind closed doors)

23 May 2026	Australia	0–0	New Zealand	Canberra, Australia
		Report		Stadium: Australian Institute of Sport

==== AFC U-20 Women's Asian Cup qualification ====
6 August 2025 Group stage	Australia	14–0	Tajikistan	Dushanbe, Tajikistan
22:00 UTC+5	Halmarick 3', 7', 20', 42'; Breier 22'; Caspers 28'; Ochildieva 31' (o.g.); Fuller 48'; Prakash 50' (pen.), 72'; Saveska 58', 82', 90+4'; Luchtmeijer 89'	Report		Stadium: Pamir Stadium; Referee: Dong Fangyu (China)

8 August 2025 Group stage	Palestine	0–3	Australia	Dushanbe, Tajikistan
19:00 UTC+5		Report	Trimis 8'; Luchtmeijer 68'; Lobo 80'	Stadium: Pamir Stadium; Referee: Haruna Kanematsu (Japan)

10 August 2025 Group stage	Australia	3–0	Chinese Taipei	Dushanbe, Tajikistan
19:00 UTC+5	Lin Szu-ying 37' (o.g.); Halmarick 64', 76'	Report		Stadium: Pamir Stadium; Referee: Dong Fangyu (China)

==== AFC U-20 Women's Asian Cup ====
2 April 2026 Group stage	Australia	5–0	Chinese Taipei	Pathum Thani, Thailand
16:00 UTC+7	Halmarick 24', 50'; Fuller 44'; Trimis 53', 61'	Report		Stadium: Pathum Thani Stadium; Attendance: 75; Referee: Gulshoda Saidqulova (Uzbekistan)

5 April 2026 Group stage	India	0–5	Australia	Pathum Thani, Thailand
16:00 UTC+7		Report	Halmarick 38' (pen.), 39', 48'; Butrus 54'; Brown 90+4'	Stadium: Pathum Thani Stadium; Attendance: 66; Referee: Esra'a Al-Mbaidin (Jordan)

8 April 2026 Group stage	Japan	5–2	Australia	Bangkok, Thailand
16:00 UTC+7	Fukushima 45+3', 54'; Tago 65'; Kimura 81', 84'	Report	Prakash 39'; Brown 86'	Stadium: Rajamangala Stadium; Referee: Rawdha Al-Mansoori (United Arab Emirates)

12 April 2026 Quarter-final	North Korea	3–0	Australia	Pathum Thani, Thailand
16:00 UTC+7	Pak Ok-i 3'; Sullivan 74' (o.g.); Ro Un-hyang 90'	Report		Stadium: Pathum Thani Stadium; Attendance: 137; Referee: Gulshoda Saidqulova (Uzbekistan)

=== Men's under-17 ===
==== Friendlies ====
The following is a list of friendlies played by the men's under-17 national team in 2025–26.

11 September 2025 27th International Youth Football	Albirex Niigata U17 Selection (Japan)	3–1	Australia	Niigata, Japan
15:00 UTC+9		Report	Conroy (pen.)	Stadium: Sun Sportsland Shibata

13 September 2025 27th International Youth Football	Australia	2–1	Wales	Niigata, Japan
15:00 UTC+9	Becvinovski 13'; Milliner 35'	Report	Dignum 90'	Stadium: Sun Sportsland Shibata

15 September 2025 27th International Youth Football	Japan	4–0	Australia	Niigata, Japan
15:00 UTC+9	Nishioka 52'; Doiguchi 55'; Tsuneyoshi 62'; Kurahashi 90'	Report		Stadium: Denka Big Swan Stadium

17 January 2026 2026 PacificAus Sports Football Tour	Fiji	0–2	Australia	Lautoka, Fiji
		Report	Court 19'; Sikora 65'	Stadium: Churchill Park

20 January 2026 2026 PacificAus Sports Football Tour	Solomon Islands	2–5	Australia	Honiara, Solomon Islands
	Fiumae 14'; Abana 45+3'	Report	Becvinovski 7', 49', 65'; Lombardo 36'; Court 82' (pen.)	Stadium: National Stadium

24 January 2026 2026 PacificAus Sports Football Tour	Solomon Islands	1–3	Australia	Honiara, Solomon Islands
	Abana 58'	Report	Olukhale 19'; Hassarati 71'; Becvinovski 89'	Stadium: National Stadium

==== AFC U-17 Asian Cup qualification ====
24 November 2025 AFC U-17 Asian Cup qualifiers	Jordan	0–1	Australia	Aqaba, Jordan
16:00 UTC+3		Report	Court 54'	Stadium: Al-Aqaba Stadium

26 November 2025 AFC U-17 Asian Cup qualifiers	Australia	3–0	Bhutan	Aqaba, Jordan
19:00 UTC+3	Olukhale 48'; Reid 52'; Becvinovski 75'	Report		Stadium: Al-Aqaba Stadium

28 November 2025 AFC U-17 Asian Cup qualifiers	Philippines	0–6	Australia	Aqaba, Jordan
16:00 UTC+3		Report	Hassarati 4', 23', 60', 76'; Oliveira 6'; Shah 90'	Stadium: Al-Aqaba Stadium

30 November 2025 AFC U-17 Asian Cup qualifiers	Australia	3–3	Iraq	Aqaba, Jordan
19:00 UTC+3	Court 30' (pen.), 36'; Becvinovski 74'	Report	Al-Nasari 48'; Hayder 61', 69'	Stadium: Al-Aqaba Stadium

==== ASEAN U-17 Boys' Championship ====
11 April 2026 Group stage	Australia	12–0	Brunei	Sidoarjo, Indonesia
15:30 UTC+7	Hassarati 3', 35', 56', 58', 81'; O'Carroll 31'; Da Cruz 34', 74'; Sayon 45+1', 49'; Katrib 52'; Zharif 70' (o.g.)	Report		Stadium: Gelora Delta Stadium; Referee: Alongkorn Khonwai (Thailand)

14 April 2026 Group stage	Singapore	0–1	Australia	Sidoarjo, Indonesia
19:30 UTC+7		Report	Becvinovski 90+5'	Stadium: Gelora Delta Stadium; Referee: Đỗ Khánh Nam (Vietnam)

17 April 2026 Group stage	Australia	2–0	Cambodia	Sidoarjo, Indonesia
15:30 UTC+7	Hassarati 8'; Sikora 80'	Report		Stadium: Gelora Delta Stadium; Referee: Muhammad Izzul Fikri Kamaruzaman (Malaysia)

22 April 2026 Semi-final	Vietnam	2–1	Australia	Sidoarjo, Indonesia
19:30 UTC+7	Nguyễn Mạnh Cường 45+4'; Chu Ngọc Nguyễn Lực 61'	Report	Becvinovski 9'	Stadium: Gelora Delta Stadium; Referee: Yusuke Ohashi (Japan)

24 April 2026 Third place match	Laos	0–8	Australia	Sidoarjo, Indonesia
15:30 UTC+7		Report	Sikora 20'; Hassarati 29' (pen.), 31', 40', 51', 90+5'; A. Reid 44', 58'	Stadium: Gelora Delta Stadium; Referee: Alongkorn Khonwai (Thailand)

==== AFC U-17 Asian Cup ====
North Korea withdrew due to concerns related to the 2026 Iran War, leaving the tournament at 15 teams. Australia qualified for the 2026 FIFA U-17 World Cup in Qatar, after reaching the quarter-finals.

6 May 2026 Group stage	Australia	4–0	India	Jeddah, Saudi Arabia
19:00 UTC+3	Becvinovski 4'; Court 29' (pen.); Demuth 74'; Oliveira 86'	Report		Stadium: King Abdullah Sports City Training Stadium; Referee: Lothar D'hondt (Belgium)

10 May 2026 Group stage	North Korea	Cancelled	Australia	Jeddah, Saudi Arabia
20:30 UTC+3		Source		Stadium: King Abdullah Sports City Training Stadium

13 May 2026 Group stage	Uzbekistan	2–0	Australia	Jeddah, Saudi Arabia
19:00 UTC+3	Murodov 28'; Ravshanbekov 45'	Report		Stadium: King Abdullah Sports City Training Stadium; Referee: Yahya Al-Balushi (Oman)

16 May 2026 Quarter-final	Vietnam	0–3	Australia	Jeddah, Saudi Arabia
20:00 UTC+3		Report	O'Carroll 40'; Hassarati 60'; Gerald 75'	Stadium: King Abdullah Sports City Training Stadium; Attendance: 25; Referee: Sultan Al-Hammadi (United Arab Emirates)

19 May 2026 Semi-final	China	2–0	Australia	Jeddah, Saudi Arabia
21:30 UTC+3	Shuai Weihao 48'; Xie Jin 90'	Report		Stadium: King Abdullah Sports City Hall Stadium; Attendance: 306; Referee: Abdullah Al-Shehri (Saudi Arabia)

=== Women's under-17 ===
==== Friendlies ====
The following is a list of friendlies played by the women's under-17 national team in 2025–26.

25 November 2025	Australia	0–2	Thailand	Sydney, Australia
19:00 AEDT		Report	Prawnapa 12'; Kawinthida 44'	Stadium: Wanderers Football Park

28 November 2025	Australia	1–1	Thailand	Gosford, Australia
16:00 AEDT	Turkkan 3'	Report	Nattatida 86'	Stadium: polytec Stadium

==== ASEAN U-16 Women's Championship ====
21 August 2025 Group stage	Australia	2–1	Thailand	Surakarta, Indonesia
15:30 WIB	Nicholas 16'; Jugovic 67'	Report	Nattatida 87'	Stadium: Sriwedari Stadium; Referee: Trần Thị Thanh (Vietnam)

23 August 2025 Group stage	Singapore	0–3	Australia	Surakarta, Indonesia
19:30 WIB		Report	Mouithys-Mickalad 25', 82'; Gavranic 53'	Stadium: Sriwedari Stadium; Referee: Keomany Phengmeuangkhoun (Laos)

27 August 2025 Semi-final	Indonesia	0–3	Australia	Surakarta, Indonesia
19:30 WIB		Report	Puckett 22', 27'; Jugovic 58'	Stadium: Manahan Stadium; Referee: Asaka Koizumi (Japan)

29 August 2025 Final	Thailand	0–1	Australia	Surakarta, Indonesia
19:30 WIB		Report	Mouithys-Mickalad 49'	Stadium: Manahan Stadium; Referee: Cha Min-ji (South Korea)

==== AFC U-17 Women's Asian Cup qualification ====
13 October 2025	Northern Mariana Islands	3–0; Awarded (Note: The Asian Football Confederation stated that Australia fielded an ineligible player—a violation of Article 25.1 of the AFC Disciplinary and Ethics Code; therefore, Australia is considered the losing team for this match.)	Australia	Singapore
19:30 UTC+8		Report	Corbett 1'; Rako 4', 9', 27', 51'; Mouithys-Mickalad 10'; Sullivan 18'; Sarris 35'; Puckett 41'; Calvanese 44', 58', 69'; Leong 45+2'; Nicholas 47', 77'; George 50' (o.g.); Bagiante 52', 56'; Muir 54', 87'; Pearson 67'; Hussein 74'	Stadium: Bishan Stadium

17 October 2025	Singapore	0–11	Australia	Singapore
19:30 UTC+8		Report	Mouithys-Mickalad 11', 13', 17', 20'; Corbett 26'; Pearson 29'; Rako 36', 45+2', 75'; Sarris 44'; Nicholas 61'	Stadium: Bishan Stadium

==== AFC U-17 Women's Asian Cup ====
Australia qualified for the 2026 FIFA U-17 Women's World Cup in Morocco, after reaching the semi-finals.

2 May 2026 Group stage	Australia	2–0	India	Suzhou, China
19:30 CST	Mouithys-Mickalad 25'; Basnett 59' (o.g.)	Report		Stadium: Suzhou Taihu Football Sports Centre; Attendance: 80; Referee: Maïka Vanderstichel (France)

5 May 2026 Group stage	Lebanon	1–1	Australia	Suzhou, China
15:30 CST	Karnib 59'	Report	Mouithys-Mickalad 30'	Stadium: Suzhou Taihu Football Sports Centre; Attendance: 157; Referee: Roziyabonu Yusupova (Uzbekistan)

8 May 2026 Group stage	Japan	5–0	Australia	Suzhou, China
15:30 CST	Hanashiro 16', 22'; Tamamura 35'; Kurita 52'; Higuchi 73'	Report		Stadium: Suzhou Taihu Football Sports Centre; Attendance: 50; Referee: Yu Hong (China)

11 May 2026 Quarter-final	Vietnam	0–2	Australia	Suzhou, China
15:30 CST		Report	Karaberis 28'; Hussein 31'	Stadium: Suzhou Sports Centre Stadium; Attendance: 93; Referee: Jon Sol-mi (North Korea)

14 May 2026 Semi-final	Japan	4–0	Australia	Suzhou, China
15:00 CST	Bradshaw 3' (o.g.); Kurita 24', 38'; Ota 74'	Report		Stadium: Suzhou Sports Centre Stadium; Attendance: 175; Referee: Trần Thị Thanh (Vietnam)

== AFC competitions ==
=== AFC Champions League Elite ===
Melbourne City qualified to the League stage as runners-up in the 2024–25 A-League Men. The Premiers Auckland FC could not qualify for Asian Football Confederation competitions as they are based in New Zealand, which is part of the Oceania Football Confederation.

Pos	Team	Pld	W	D	L	GF	GA	GD	Pts	Qualification
3	(Japan) Sanfrecce Hiroshima	8	4	3	1	10	6	+4	15	Advance to round of 16
4	(Thailand) Buriram United	8	4	2	2	10	8	+2	14	Advance to round of 16
5	(Australia) Melbourne City	8	4	2	2	9	7	+2	14	Advance to round of 16
6	(Malaysia) Johor Darul Ta'zim	8	3	2	3	8	7	+1	11	Advance to round of 16
7	(South Korea) FC Seoul	8	2	4	2	10	9	+1	10	Advance to round of 16

Source: AFC
Rules for classification: 1) points; 2) goal difference; 3) number of goals scored; 4) number of matches won; 5) penalty shoot-out if only two teams remain tied and played each other on the final matchday 6) fair play ranking; 7) drawing of lots

==== Knockout stage ====
3 March 2026 Round of 16	Melbourne City (Australia)	1–1	(Thailand) Buriram United	Melbourne, Australia
18:45 AEDT	Mazzeo 90+5'	Report	Bissoli 37'	Stadium: Melbourne Rectangular Stadium; Attendance: 1,478; Referee: Khalid Al-Turais (Saudi Arabia)

10 March 2026 Round of 16	Buriram United (Thailand)	0–0 (a.e.t.) (1–1 agg.) (4–2 p)	(Australia) Melbourne City	Buriram, Thailand
19:15 UTC+7:00		Report		Stadium: Buriram Stadium; Attendance: 22,950; Referee: Kim Jong-Hyeok (South Korea)
	Penalties
	Čaušić (penalty scored); Schindler (penalty scored); P. Žulj (penalty scored); Dougall (penalty scored)		(penalty scored) Caputo; (penalty missed) Teague; (penalty missed) Behich; (penalty scored) Younis

=== AFC Champions League Two ===
Macarthur FC qualified to the Group stage as winners of the 2024 Australia Cup.

Pos	Team	Pld	W	D	L	GF	GA	GD	Pts	Qualification
1	(Australia) Macarthur FC	6	4	1	1	11	6	+5	13	Advance to round of 16
2	(Vietnam) Công An Hà Nội	6	2	2	2	9	7	+2	8	Advance to round of 16
3	(Hong Kong) Tai Po	6	2	1	3	7	12	−5	7	
4	(China) Beijing Guoan	6	1	2	3	10	12	−2	5	

Source: ACL2
Rules for classification: Tiebreakers

==== Knockout stage ====
12 February 2026 Round of 16	Bangkok United (Thailand)	2–0	(Australia) Macarthur FC	Pathum Thani, Thailand
19:15 UTC+7	Alhaft 37'; Arthur 72'	Report		Stadium: Pathum Thani Stadium; Referee: Shen Yinhao (China)

19 February 2026 Round of 16	Macarthur FC (Australia)	2–2	(Thailand) Bangkok United	Sydney, Australia
18:45 UTC+11	Scott 41'; Sawyer 90+2'	Report	Al-Ghassani 2', 33'	Stadium: Campbelltown Sports Stadium; Attendance: 1,666; Referee: Meder Tayçiev (Kyrgyzstan)

=== AFC Women's Champions League ===
Melbourne City qualified for the competition as Premiers of the 2024–25 A-League Women.

Quarter-finals
29 March – Melbourne
(Football Australia) Melbourne City	2
(Uzbekistan Football Association) Nasaf	1
28 March – Tokyo
(Japan Football Association) Tokyo Verdy Beleza	5
(Philippine Football Federation) Stallion Laguna	0
28 March – Vientiane
(DPR Korea Football Association) Naegohyang	3
(Vietnam Football Federation) Hồ Chí Minh City	0
29 March – Wuhan
(Chinese Football Association) Wuhan Jiangda	0
(Korea Football Association) Suwon	4

Semi-finals
20 May – Suwon
(Football Australia) Melbourne City	1
(Japan Football Association) Tokyo Verdy Beleza	3
20 May – Suwon
(DPR Korea Football Association) Naegohyang	2
(Korea Football Association) Suwon	1

Final
23 May – Suwon
(Japan Football Association) Tokyo Verdy Beleza	0
(DPR Korea Football Association) Naegohyang	1

==== Knockout stage ====
29 March 2026 Quarter-final	Melbourne City (Australia)	2–1	(Uzbekistan) Nasaf	Melbourne, Australia
15:00	McNamara 38'; Uchendu 89'	Report	Mamatkarimova 42'	Stadium: The Home of The Matildas; Referee: Yoshimi Yamashita (Japan)

20 May 2026 Semi-final	Melbourne City (Australia)	1–3	(Japan) Tokyo Verdy Beleza	Suwon, South Korea
14:00 UTC+9	Keane 37'	Report	Shiokoshi 4', 78'; Shinjo 10'	Stadium: Suwon Sports Complex; Attendance: 1,362; Referee: Tian Jin (China)

== OFC competitions ==
=== 2026 OFC Professional League ===
Australian club South Melbourne participated in this new regional competition.

Qualification play-off
17 May — Auckland (MSS)
4	(Fiji) Bula FC	1
5	Vanuatu United (a.e.t.)	2

Semi-finals
20 May — Auckland (MSS)
1	(Australia) South Melbourne	4
5	Vanuatu United	0
20 May — Auckland (MSS)
2	(New Zealand) Auckland FC	1
3	(New Zealand) South Island United	0

Final
24 May — Auckland (EP)
1	(Australia) South Melbourne	1
2	(New Zealand) Auckland FC	2

== Domestic leagues ==
=== A-League Men ===
The number of clubs was reduced from 13 in the previous season to 12, following the collapse of Western United.

Pos	Team	Pld	W	D	L	GF	GA	GD	Pts	Qualification
1	Newcastle Jets	26	15	3	8	55	39	+16	48	Qualification for the AFC Champions League Elite league stage and the finals series (Note: The top two teams enter the finals series at the semi-finals, while the teams ranked third to sixth enter the finals series at the elimination-finals.)
2	Adelaide United	26	12	7	7	46	36	+10	43	Qualification for the AFC Champions League Elite preliminary stage and the finals series
3	Auckland FC (Note: Auckland FC and Wellington Phoenix cannot qualify for Asian Football Confederation competitions as they are based in New Zealand, which is part of the Oceania Football Confederation.) (C)	26	11	9	6	42	29	+13	42	Qualification for the finals series
4	Melbourne Victory	26	11	7	8	44	33	+11	40	Qualification for the AFC Champions League Two group stage and the finals series (Note: Since the 2025 Australia Cup winners, Newcastle Jets, occupy an AFC Champions League Elite position, the AFC Champions League Two spot goes to the next eligible team. The AFC ruled that the Australia Cup runner-up Heidelberg United was ineligible to compete.)
5	Sydney FC	26	11	6	9	33	25	+8	39	Qualification for the finals series
6	Melbourne City	26	10	8	8	33	33	0	38	Qualification for the finals series
7	Macarthur FC	26	9	7	10	37	44	−7	34	
8	Wellington Phoenix	26	9	6	11	36	48	−12	33	
9	Central Coast Mariners	26	8	8	10	35	42	−7	32	
10	Perth Glory	26	8	7	11	32	39	−7	31	
11	Brisbane Roar	26	6	8	12	27	36	−9	26	
12	Western Sydney Wanderers	26	5	6	15	27	43	−16	21	

Source: A-Leagues
Rules for classification: 1) points; 2) goal difference; 3) goals scored; 4) wins; 5) head-to-head results; 5a) head-to-head points; 5b) head-to-head goal difference; 6) Fair Play points; 7) away goal difference; 8) away goals per match; 9) home goal difference; 10) home goals per match; 11) toss of a coin in an event of a tie of two clubs.
(C) Champions

==== Finals series ====
Elimination-finals
4	Melbourne Victory	0
5	Sydney FC	1
3	Auckland FC (p)	1 (7)
6	Melbourne City	1 (6)

Semi-finals
1	Newcastle Jets	1	1	2 (2)
5	Sydney FC (p)	1	1	2 (4)
2	Adelaide United	1	0	1
3	Auckland FC	1	3	4

Grand Final
3	Auckland FC	1
5	Sydney FC	0

=== A-League Women ===
Similar to the Men's competition, the number of clubs was reduced from 12 in the previous season to 11, following the collapse of Western United.

Pos	Team	Pld	W	D	L	GF	GA	GD	Pts	Qualification
1	Melbourne City (C)	20	12	4	4	36	20	+16	40	Qualification for AFC Women's Champions League and Finals series
2	Wellington Phoenix (Note: Wellington Phoenix cannot qualify for the AFC Women's Champions League as they are based in New Zealand, which is part of the Oceania Football Confederation.)	20	10	4	6	38	17	+21	34	Qualification for Finals series
3	Canberra United	20	9	4	7	30	24	+6	31	Qualification for Finals series
4	Brisbane Roar	20	9	4	7	37	39	−2	31	Qualification for Finals series
5	Adelaide United	20	9	3	8	24	26	−2	30	Qualification for Finals series
6	Melbourne Victory	20	8	4	8	27	24	+3	28	Qualification for Finals series
7	Central Coast Mariners	20	7	7	6	27	26	+1	28	
8	Perth Glory	20	7	3	10	20	30	−10	24	
9	Newcastle Jets	20	7	2	11	30	36	−6	23	
10	Sydney FC	20	4	7	9	18	29	−11	19	
11	Western Sydney Wanderers	20	5	4	11	18	34	−16	19	

Source: A-Leagues
Rules for classification: 1) points; 2) goal difference; 3) goals scored; 4) wins; 5) head-to-head results; 5a) head-to-head points; 5b) head-to-head goal difference; 6) Fair Play points; 7) away goal difference; 8) away goals per match; 9) home goal difference; 10) home goals per match; 11) toss of a coin in an event of a tie of two clubs.
(C) Champions

==== Finals series ====
Elimination-finals
3	Canberra United	1
6	Melbourne Victory	3
4	Brisbane Roar	3
5	Adelaide United	0

Semi-finals
1	Melbourne City	1	1	2
6	Melbourne Victory	0	0	0
2	Wellington Phoenix	1	2	3
4	Brisbane Roar	2	0	2

Grand Final
1	Melbourne City	3
2	Wellington Phoenix	1

=== National Premier Leagues ===
In addition to the Foundation Clubs, the following teams qualified for the 2025 Australian Championship:

Competition	Club
2025 NPL Capital Football	Canberra Croatia
2025 NPL NSW	NWS Spirit
2025 NPL Northern NSW	Broadmeadow Magic
2025 NPL Queensland	Moreton City Excelsior
2025 NPL South Australia	North Eastern MetroStars
2025 NPL Tasmania	South Hobart
2025 NPL Victoria	Heidelberg United (Note: As the 2025 NPL Victoria premiers, Avondale FC, had already qualified as a foundation club, their berth went to the league's second-placed team Heidelberg United.)
2025 NPL Western Australia	Bayswater City

==== Australian Championship ====
Knockout stage

Quarter-finals
23 November
South Melbourne	2
NWS Spirit	0
22 November
Heidelberg United	6
North Eastern MetroStars	1
21 November
Wests APIA	1 (7)
Marconi Stallions (p)	1 (8)
22 November
Avondale FC	1
Moreton City Excelsior	3

Semi-finals
29 November
South Melbourne	1
Heidelberg United	0
29 November
Marconi Stallions	1
Moreton City Excelsior	0

Final
6 December
South Melbourne	2
Marconi Stallions	0

== Domestic cups ==
=== Australia Cup ===
Round of 32
Heidelberg United	2
Weston Bears	0
Peninsula Power	0
Western Sydney Wanderers	3
Darwin Olympic	0
Nunawading City	9
Perth Glory	1 (7)
Wellington Phoenix (p)	1 (8)
Northern Tigers	0
Sydney United 58	1
Western United	0
Sydney FC	1
South Hobart	1
South Melbourne	2
Gold Coast Knights	0
Auckland FC	4
Avondale FC	5
Stirling Macedonia	1
APIA Leichhardt	2
Melbourne City	0
Brisbane City	2
Olympic FC	0
Olympic Kingsway (a.e.t.)	4
Melbourne Victory	3
Adelaide Croatia Raiders	2
Cooks Hill United	3
Newcastle Jets	2
Adelaide United	1
Canberra Croatia	0
North Eastern MetroStars	4
SD Raiders	0
Macarthur FC	5

Round of 16
Heidelberg United	3
Western Sydney Wanderers	0
Nunawading City	0
Wellington Phoenix	1
Sydney United 58	0
Sydney FC	2
South Melbourne	0
Auckland FC	3
Avondale FC	3
APIA Leichhardt	1
Brisbane City (p)	1 (4)
Olympic Kingsway	1 (3)
Cooks Hill United	0
Newcastle Jets	5
North Eastern MetroStars	0
Macarthur FC	2

Quarter-finals
Heidelberg United	4
Wellington Phoenix	0
Sydney FC	1 (1)
Auckland FC (p)	1 (3)
Avondale FC	6
Brisbane City	2
Newcastle Jets	3
Macarthur FC	0

Semi-finals
Heidelberg United	2
Auckland FC	0
Avondale FC	2
Newcastle Jets	4

Final
Heidelberg United	1
Newcastle Jets (a.e.t.)	3

==== Final ====
4 October 2025
19:40 AEST

Heidelberg United (2)	1–3 (a.e.t.)	Newcastle Jets (1)
Lethlean 8'	Report	Burgess 21'; Fryer 96'; Gibson 115'

Lakeside Stadium, Melbourne
Attendance: 10,000
Referee: Adam Kersey

== Deaths ==
- 8 September 2025: Doug Rennie, 91, Pan Hellenic and Sydney Austral player and referee.
- 11 October 2025: Keith Learmonth, 92, Australia, Corrimal Rangers, and Corrimal United forward.
- 9 December 2025: Dixie Deans, 79, Scotland and Adelaide City forward.
- 27 January 2026: Rado Vidošić, 64, Queensland Lions player, Brisbane Roar, Sydney FC, Melbourne Victory, and Wellington Phoenix assistant coach, and Brisbane Roar, Melbourne City Women, and Melbourne City head coach.

== Retirements ==
- 3 July 2025: Jimmy Jeggo, 33, former Australia, FFV NTC, Melbourne Victory, Adelaide United, and Melbourne City midfielder.
- 10 July 2025: Mitchell Langerak, 36, former Australia, Melbourne Victory, and South Melbourne goalkeeper.
- 19 July 2025: Jessica McDonald, 37, former United States, Melbourne Victory, and Western United forward.
- 28 July 2025: Marco Rojas, 33, former New Zealand, Wellington Phoenix, Melbourne Victory, and Brisbane Roar forward.
- 22 August 2025: Laini Freier, 24, former Australia and Brisbane Roar midfielder.
- 23 August 2025: Neil Kilkenny, 39, former Australia, Melbourne City, Perth Glory, Western United, and Sorrento midfielder.
- 28 August 2025: Lydia Williams, 37, former Australia, Canberra United, Melbourne City, and Melbourne Victory goalkeeper.
- 10 September 2025: Bruno Fornaroli, 38, former Australia, Melbourne City, Perth Glory, and Melbourne Victory forward.
- 3 October 2025: Lia Privitelli, 31, former Melbourne Victory midfielder.
- 14 October 2025: Hiroaki Aoyama, 29, former Perth Glory midfielder.
- 12 January 2026: Gabriel Cleur, 27, former Western Sydney Wanderers defender.
- 17 January 2026: Valère Germain, 35, former Macarthur FC forward.
- 24 January 2026: Chloe Berryhill, 31, former Australia, Sydney FC, Newcastle Jets, North Shore Mariners, Blacktown Spartans, Western United, and Western Sydney Wanderers midfielder.
- 4 April 2026: Jodi Ülkekul, 28, former Sydney FC attacker.
- 24 April 2026: Damien Da Silva, 37, former Melbourne Victory and Macarthur FC defender.
- 25 April 2026: Josh Risdon, 33, former Australia, Perth Glory, Western Sydney Wanderers and Western United defender.
- 30 May 2026: Tolgay Arslan, 35, former Melbourne City midfielder.
