= 2025 ASEAN Women's Championship squads =

2025 ASEAN women's football squads

The 2025 ASEAN Women's Championship was an international women's association football tournament held in Vietnam from 6 to 19 August 2025. The eight national teams involved in the tournament are required to register a squad of 23 players, including three goalkeepers. Only players in these squads are eligible to take part in the tournament. If a player became seriously injured or ill prior to the tournament, they could be replaced in the squad prior to their first match.

The age listed for each player is on 6 August 2025, the first day of the tournament. The numbers of caps and goals listed for each player do not include any matches played after the start of the tournament. The club listed is the club for which the player last played a competitive match prior to the tournament. A flag is included for coaches who have a nationality different from their own national team.

== Group A ==
=== Vietnam ===
Vietnam named their preliminary squad on 12 July 2025, consisting of 28 players. The final squad was announced on 4 August.

Head coach: Mai Đức Chung

No.	Pos.	Player	Date of birth (age)	Caps	Goals	Club
14	GK	Trần Thị Kim Thanh	18 September 1993 (aged 31)	58	0	(Vietnam Football Federation) Thai Nguyen T&T
20	GK	Khổng Thị Hằng	10 October 1993 (aged 31)	33	0	(Vietnam Football Federation) Than KSVN
1	GK	Quách Thu Em	15 August 1995 (aged 29)	0	0	(Vietnam Football Federation) Ho Chi Minh City
3	DF	Chương Thị Kiều	19 August 1995 (aged 29)	95	5	(Vietnam Football Federation) Ho Chi Minh City
17	DF	Trần Thị Thu Thảo	15 January 1993 (aged 32)	54	3	(Vietnam Football Federation) Ho Chi Minh City
5	DF	Hoàng Thị Loan	6 February 1995 (aged 30)	48	2	(Vietnam Football Federation) Hanoi
4	DF	Trần Thị Thu	15 January 1991 (aged 34)	43	2	(Vietnam Football Federation) Thai Nguyen T&T
2	DF	Lương Thị Thu Thương	1 May 2000 (aged 25)	35	0	(Vietnam Football Federation) Than KSVN
22	DF	Nguyễn Thị Mỹ Anh	27 November 1994 (aged 30)	32	1	(Vietnam Football Federation) Thai Nguyen T&T
10	DF	Trần Thị Hải Linh	8 June 2001 (aged 24)	27	1	(Vietnam Football Federation) Hanoi
13	DF	Lê Thị Diễm My	6 March 1994 (aged 31)	27	0	(Vietnam Football Federation) Than KSVN
15	DF	Trần Thị Duyên	28 December 2000 (aged 24)	11	1	(Vietnam Football Federation) Phong Phu Ha Nam
7	MF	Nguyễn Thị Tuyết Dung	13 December 1993 (aged 31)	129	52	(Vietnam Football Federation) Phong Phu Ha Nam
23	MF	Nguyễn Thị Bích Thùy	1 May 1994 (aged 31)	77	18	(Vietnam Football Federation) Thai Nguyen T&T
11	MF	Thái Thị Thảo	12 February 1995 (aged 30)	55	14	(Vietnam Football Federation) Hanoi
16	MF	Dương Thị Vân	20 September 1994 (aged 30)	54	2	(Vietnam Football Federation) Than KSVN
15	MF	Nguyễn Thị Vạn	10 January 1997 (aged 28)	46	18	(Vietnam Football Federation) Than KSVN
21	MF	Ngân Thị Vạn Sự	29 April 2001 (aged 24)	39	9	(Vietnam Football Federation) Hanoi
19	MF	Nguyễn Thị Thanh Nhã	25 September 2001 (aged 23)	35	7	(Vietnam Football Federation) Hanoi
8	MF	Nguyễn Thị Trúc Hương	4 March 2000 (aged 25)	7	0	(Vietnam Football Federation) Than KSVN
6	MF	Trần Thị Thu Xuân	21 December 2002 (aged 22)	0	0	(Vietnam Football Federation) Than KSVN
9	FW	Huỳnh Như (Captain)	28 November 1991 (aged 33)	111	68	(Vietnam Football Federation) Ho Chi Minh City
12	FW	Phạm Hải Yến	9 November 1994 (aged 30)	88	49	(Vietnam Football Federation) Hanoi

=== Thailand ===
Thailand named their preliminary squad on 21 July 2025, consisting of 24 players. The final squad was announced on 2 August.

Head coach: (Japan) Futoshi Ikeda

No.	Pos.	Player	Date of birth (age)	Caps	Goals	Club
1	GK	Chonticha Panyarung	30 December 2008 (aged 16)			(Football Association of Thailand) Khon Kaen Sports School
18	GK	Chalisa Phongoen	15 July 2004 (aged 21)			Free Agent
22	GK	Pawarisa Homyamyen	31 January 2004 (aged 21)			(Football Association of Thailand) Chonburi
2	DF	Sakuna Senabuth	8 September 1995 (aged 29)			(Football Association of Thailand) Bangkok
3	DF	Supaporn Inthraprasit	18 February 2004 (aged 21)			(Football Association of Thailand) Chonburi
4	DF	Natcha Kaewanta	3 December 2006 (aged 18)			(Football Association of Thailand) Chonburi
5	DF	Pawarisa Keram	9 February 2006 (aged 19)			(Football Association of Thailand) Kasem Bundit University
6	DF	Parichat Thongrong	14 May 2006 (aged 19)			(Football Association of Thailand) Nakhon Si Thammarat Sports School
7	DF	Thanchanok Cheunarom	30 June 2006 (aged 19)			(Football Association of Thailand) Chonburi
14	DF	Sankunkan Chompooseang	6 June 2005 (aged 20)			(Football Association of Thailand) Kasem Bundit University
19	DF	Pinyaphat Klinklai	26 January 2008 (aged 17)			(Football Association of Thailand) Nakhon Si Thammarat Sports School
8	MF	Pluemjai Sontisawat	20 July 2003 (aged 22)			(Football Association of Thailand) Chonburi
9	MF	Ploychompoo Somnuek	26 December 2002 (aged 22)			(Football Association of Thailand) Bangkok
10	MF	Julie Grønning	15 July 2007 (aged 18)			(United States Soccer Federation) Wasatch SC
11	MF	Chatchawan Rodthong	22 June 2002 (aged 23)			(Football Association of Thailand) Bangkok
12	MF	Rinyaphat Moondong	19 June 2007 (aged 18)			(Football Association of Thailand) Chonburi
13	MF	Pichayatida Manowang	17 November 2006 (aged 18)			(Football Association of Thailand) Bangkok
15	MF	Thawanrat Promthongmee	29 November 2004 (aged 20)			(Football Association of Thailand) Chonburi
21	MF	Pattaranan Aupachai	9 July 2002 (aged 23)			(Football Association of Thailand) Chonburi
16	FW	Kanjanathat Poomsri	17 January 2003 (aged 22)			(Football Association of Thailand) Kasem Bundit University
17	FW	Madison Casteen	24 October 2007 (aged 17)			(United States Soccer Federation) NC Courage Academy
20	FW	Wiranya Kwaenkasikarm	7 July 2005 (aged 20)			(Football Association of Thailand) Chonburi
23	FW	Janista Jinantuya	9 September 2003 (aged 21)			(Football Association of Thailand) Bangkok

=== Indonesia ===
Indonesia named their final squad on 4 August 2025.

Head coach: Joko Susilo

No.	Pos.	Player	Date of birth (age)	Caps	Goals	Club
23	GK	Laita Roati	19 October 1999 (aged 25)	10	0	(Football Association of Indonesia) Arema
21	GK	Indri Yulianti	30 November 2001 (aged 23)	0	0	(Football Association of Indonesia) Asprov Jabar
1	GK	Thasza Amelia	1 January 2001 (aged 24)	1	0	(Football Association of Indonesia) Asprov Jabar
17	DF	Vivi Oktavia (captain)	7 March 1997 (aged 28)	33	2	(Football Association of Indonesia) Asprov Bangka Belitung
2	DF	Remini Rumbewas	9 October 2000 (aged 24)	14	1	(Football Association of Indonesia) Toli
13	DF	Siti Nuriyah	29 October 2001 (aged 23)	1	0	(Football Association of Indonesia) Persib Bandung
20	DF	Agnes Hutapea	14 August 2000 (aged 24)	10	0	(Football Association of Indonesia) Asprov Jabar
11	DF	Feni Binsbarek	18 January 2005 (aged 20)	4	0	(Football Association of Indonesia) Toli
3	DF	Rihla Nuer	30 May 2002 (aged 23)	2	0	(Football Association of Singapore) Spicegals
6	DF	Noa Leatomu	7 November 2003 (aged 21)	1	0	(German Football Association) VfR Warbeyen
7	MF	Octavianti Dwi	25 October 1998 (aged 26)	24	3	(Football Association of Indonesia) Asprov DI Yogyakarta
15	MF	Helsya Maeisyaroh	7 May 2005 (aged 20)	25	2	(Football Association of Indonesia) Asprov Jabar
19	MF	Viny Silfianus	3 July 2002 (aged 23)	22	0	(Football Association of Malaysia) Kelana United
4	MF	Shalika Aurelia	1 August 2003 (aged 22)	15	0	(Football Association of Malaysia) Kelana United
16	MF	Rosdilah Nurrohmah	3 October 1999 (aged 25)	15	0	(Football Association of Indonesia) Raga Negeri
10	MF	Amanda Florentinae	28 November 1999 (aged 25)	3	0	(Football Association of Indonesia) Asprov Kalteng
5	MF	Aulia Mabruroh	25 January 2005 (aged 20)	0	0	(Football Association of Indonesia) Asprov Lampung
9	MF	Widja Malebbi		1	0	(Football Association of Indonesia) Asprov Sulsel
12	MF	Rosalia		0	0	(Football Association of Indonesia) Asprov Jabar
8	FW	Reva Octaviani	8 October 2003 (aged 21)	19	5	(Football Association of Indonesia) Asprov Jabar
14	FW	Isa Warps	6 March 2005 (aged 20)	4	1	(Royal Dutch Football Association) NAC Breda
18	FW	Marsela Awi	10 May 2003 (aged 22)	20	4	(Football Association of Indonesia) Toli
22	FW	Estella Loupatty	14 November 2003 (aged 21)	10	0	(Royal Belgian Football Association) Zulte Waregem

=== Cambodia ===
Cambodia named their final squad on 21 July 2025.

Head coach: (Japan) Koji Gyotoku

No.	Pos.	Player	Date of birth (age)	Caps	Goals	Club
21	GK	In Sreynech		0	0	(Football Federation of Cambodia)
22	GK	Chen Soveat	14 August 2002 (aged 22)	0	0	(Football Federation of Cambodia) Visakha
1	GK	Penh Boravy	15 September 2004 (aged 20)	0	0	(Football Federation of Cambodia) Visakha
5	DF	Sok Li	8 August 1996 (aged 28)	1	0	(Football Federation of Cambodia) Nagaworld
13	DF	Him Kanha			0	(Football Federation of Cambodia)
6	DF	Meat Saphea			0	(Football Federation of Cambodia)
3	DF	Vann Linda			0	(Football Federation of Cambodia)
20	DF	Hear Sreilas	11 November 2001 (aged 23)	1	0	(Football Federation of Cambodia) Visakha
4	DF	Selena Chhiv	11 February 2002 (aged 23)	0	0	(Canadian Soccer Association) Concordia Stingers
23	DF	Ouen Sophy			0	(Football Federation of Cambodia)
2	DF	Mak Sreyroth		0	0	(Football Federation of Cambodia) Visakha
18	MF	Phoeurng Sreyphors	28 April 2001 (aged 24)	0	0	(Football Federation of Cambodia) Visakha
15	MF	Srun Sreyleak			0	(Football Federation of Cambodia)
9	MF	Dy Sothea	2 April 2003 (aged 22)	4+	0	(Football Federation of Cambodia)
10	MF	Soem Maysam			0	(Football Federation of Cambodia)
16	MF	Han Sreykeo			0	(Football Federation of Cambodia)
12	MF	Hok Saody	18 March 2000 (aged 25)	1	1	(Football Association of Thailand) Bangkok W.F.C.
8	MF	Sea Symean			0	(Football Federation of Cambodia)
17	FW	Rith Channimol	14 March 2005 (aged 20)	0	0	(Football Federation of Cambodia) Siem Reap
11	FW	Heng Sovanmony	12 December 2004 (aged 20)	1	0	(Football Federation of Cambodia) Visakha
19	FW	Kreun Sreybol			0	(Football Federation of Cambodia)
7	FW	Kann Sreynich			0	(Football Federation of Cambodia)
14	FW	Saom Munykanitha			0	(Football Federation of Cambodia)

== Group B ==
=== Philippines ===
Philippines named their final squad on 2 August 2025.

Head coach: (Australia) Mark Torcaso

No.	Pos.	Player	Date of birth (age)	Caps	Goals	Club
1	GK	Olivia McDaniel	October 14, 1997 (aged 27)	52	0	(Philippine Football Federation) Stallion Laguna
18	GK	Inna Palacios	February 8, 1994 (aged 31)	52	0	(Philippine Football Federation) Kaya–Iloilo
22	GK	Nina Meollo	June 23, 2004 (aged 21)	1	0	(The Football Association) Ipswich Town
2	DF	Malea Cesar	December 9, 2003 (aged 21)	31	1	(United States Soccer Federation) Trinity Tigers
3	DF	Azumi Oka	April 21, 2006 (aged 19)	1	0	(United States Soccer Federation) UNC Greensboro Spartans
5	DF	Hali Long (captain)	January 21, 1995 (aged 30)	94	22	(Philippine Football Federation) Kaya–Iloilo
6	DF	Janae DeFazio	September 6, 2001 (aged 23)	6	0	(Philippine Football Federation) Makati
9	DF	Aaliyah Schinaman	September 5, 2003 (aged 21)	1	1	(United States Soccer Federation) George Mason Patriots
12	DF	Kaya Hawkinson	April 17, 2000 (aged 25)	23	1	(Philippine Football Federation) Stallion Laguna
13	DF	Rhea Chan	September 4, 2000 (aged 24)	2	0	(Philippine Football Federation) Stallion Laguna
16	DF	Aliana Weibel	November 26, 2005 (aged 19)	1	0	(United States Soccer Federation) Kent State Golden Flashes
19	DF	Lyka Cuenco	October 30, 2003 (aged 21)	0	0	(Philippine Football Federation) Kaya–Iloilo
4	MF	Charisa Lemoran	September 21, 1998 (aged 26)	26	1	(Philippine Football Federation) Stallion Laguna
8	MF	Tea Pidding	October 31, 2008 (aged 16)	0	0	(United States Soccer Federation) Del Norte High School
14	MF	Jaycee DeFazio	January 3, 2005 (aged 20)	1	0	(United States Soccer Federation) Cal Poly Mustangs
15	MF	Isabella Pasion	July 14, 2006 (aged 19)	15	0	(Philippine Football Federation) Stallion Laguna
17	MF	Alessandrea Carpio	March 4, 2002 (aged 23)	5	0	Unattached
20	MF	Quinley Quezada	April 7, 1997 (aged 28)	67	25	Unattached
21	MF	Isabella Alamo	March 21, 2007 (aged 18)	1	0	(United States Soccer Federation) Houston Christian Huskies
23	MF	Adelaide Wyrzynski	March 25, 2006 (aged 19)	1	1	(United States Soccer Federation) Tarleton State Texans
7	FW	Nina Mathelus	September 12, 2008 (aged 16)	6	0	(United States Soccer Federation) Thayer Academy
10	FW	Chandler McDaniel	February 4, 1998 (aged 27)	29	11	(Philippine Football Federation) Stallion Laguna
11	FW	Dionesa Tolentin	June 25, 2000 (aged 25)	9	2	(Philippine Football Federation) Kaya–Iloilo

=== Myanmar ===
Myanmar named their final squad on 4 August 2025.

Head coach: (Japan) Tetsuro Uki

No.	Pos.	Player	Date of birth (age)	Caps	Goals	Club
1	GK	Ei Sandar Zaw	15 February 2000 (aged 25)	2	0	(Myanmar Football Federation) Myawady W.F.C.
18	GK	Zu Latt Nadi	22 December 2000 (aged 24)	1	0	(Myanmar Football Federation) ISPE W.F.C.
22	GK	Myo Mya Mya Nyein	28 November 1999 (aged 25)	20	0	(Myanmar Football Federation) Thitsar Arman W.F.C.
2	DF	Hnin Pwint Aye	26 January 2004 (aged 21)	4	0	Unattached
3	DF	Phyu Phwe	9 May 2005 (aged 20)	4	0	(Myanmar Football Federation) Yangon United W.F.C.
4	DF	Zune Yu Ya Oo	12 February 2001 (aged 24)	24	0	(Myanmar Football Federation) Ayeyawady FC
5	DF	Phyu Phyu Win	12 January 2004 (aged 21)	23	0	(Myanmar Football Federation) Ayeyawady FC
14	DF	Lin Lae Oo		10	0	(Myanmar Football Federation) ISPE W.F.C.
16	DF	May Thet Mon Myint	28 November 2004 (aged 20)	15	0	(Myanmar Football Federation) Thitsar Arman W.F.C.
17	DF	Than Than Nwe		5	0	(Myanmar Football Federation) ISPE W.F.C.
23	DF	Khin Myo Thandar Htun		3	0	(Myanmar Football Federation) Shan United W.F.C.
6	MF	Naw Htet Htet Wai	30 July 2000 (aged 25)	29	0	(Myanmar Football Federation) Ayeyawady FC
10	MF	Khin Mo Mo Tun	3 July 1999 (aged 26)	37	5	(Myanmar Football Federation) Thitsar Arman W.F.C.
11	MF	Yu Par Khaing	31 January 1996 (aged 29)	32	4	(Myanmar Football Federation) Shan United W.F.C.
12	MF	Win Win	12 February 2003 (aged 22)	10	8	(Myanmar Football Federation) Thitsar Arman W.F.C.
15	MF	Nang Phyu Phyu Thwe		2	0	(Myanmar Football Federation) Shan United W.F.C.
19	MF	Shwe Yee Tun	14 May 2003 (aged 22)	9	6	(Myanmar Football Federation) ISPE W.F.C.
21	MF	Yoon Wadi Hlaing	9 September 2005 (aged 19)	11	2	(Myanmar Football Federation) Yangon United W.F.C.
7	FW	Win Theingi Tun	1 February 1995 (aged 30)	84	77	(Football Association of Malaysia) Sabah FA
8	FW	San Thaw Thaw	2 January 2001 (aged 24)	44	18	(Myanmar Football Federation) Ayeyawady FC
9	FW	Myat Noe Khin	24 July 2003 (aged 22)	22	8	(Myanmar Football Federation) Thitsar Arman W.F.C.
13	FW	May Htet Lu	29 January 2003 (aged 22)	7	6	Unattached

=== Australia U23 ===
Australia U23 named their 23-player squad on 30 July 2025. However, Bryleeh Henry was ruled out due to sickness and was replaced by Abbey Lemon but when Hayley Taylor-Young was also ruled out – without a replacement – the team were left with 22 players from 7 August.

Head coach: Joe Palatsides.

No.	Pos.	Player	Date of birth (age)	Caps	Goals	Club
18	GK	Tahlia Franco	29 June 2006 (aged 19)	0	0	(Football Australia) Sydney FC
12	GK	Sally James	18 October 2002 (aged 22)	0	0	(Football Australia) Canberra United
1	GK	Chloe Lincoln	4 January 2005 (aged 20)	3	0	(Football Australia) Western United
21	DF	Claudia Cicco	27 August 2004 (aged 20)	0	0	(Football Australia) Newcastle Jets
17	DF	Sasha Grove	30 December 2004 (aged 20)	0	0	(Football Australia) Western United
19	DF	Grace Johnston	7 April 2005 (aged 20)	0	0	(Football Australia) Perth Glory
22	DF	Abbey Lemon	14 August 2002 (aged 22)	5	0	(Football Australia) Sydney FC
4	DF	Ella Tonkin	14 December 2002 (aged 22)	6	0	(Football Australia) Adelaide United
2	DF	Alana Cerne	11 December 2002 (aged 22)	1	1	(Football Australia) Western United
15	DF	Tori Tumeth	5 October 2004 (aged 20)	0	0	(Football Australia) Sydney FC
23	DF	Naomi Thomas-Chinnama	13 May 2004 (aged 21)	3	0	(Football Australia) Perth Glory
8	MF	Georgie Cassidy	27 May 2005 (aged 20)	0	0	(Football Australia) Perth Glory
16	MF	Amy Chessari	19 May 2004 (aged 21)	0	0	(Football Australia) Western Sydney Wanderers
6	MF	Isabel Gomez	6 July 2002 (aged 23)	2	0	(Football Australia) Central Coast Mariners
13	MF	Alana Jančevski	13 March 2003 (aged 22)	0	0	(Football Australia) Melbourne Victory
5	MF	Aideen Keane	9 February 2002 (aged 23)	0	0	(Football Australia) Canberra United
20	MF	Leticia McKenna	7 August 2002 (aged 22)	1	0	(Football Australia) Melbourne City
10	MF	Sofia Sakalis	11 July 2002 (aged 23)	0	0	(Football Australia) Melbourne Victory
14	MF	Alicia Woods	18 January 2004 (aged 21)	0	0	(Football Australia) Brisbane Roar
9	FW	Holly Furphy	29 April 2002 (aged 23)	0	0	(Football Australia) Melbourne Victory
7	FW	Emilia Murray	9 November 2004 (aged 20)	0	0	(Football Australia) Melbourne City
11	FW	Annalise Rasmussen	22 May 2005 (aged 20)	0	0	(Football Australia) Central Coast Mariners

=== Timor-Leste ===
Head coach: Simón Elissetche

No.	Pos.	Player	Date of birth (age)	Club
1	GK	Madalena Soares	13 May 2001 (aged 24)	(East Timor Football Federation) S'Amuser FC
12	GK	Gorette da Costa	31 May 2004 (aged 21)	(East Timor Football Federation) Buibere FC
20	GK	Maria Bossa		
2	DF	Maria da Conceição	2 January 1997 (aged 28)	(East Timor Football Federation) AD SLB Laulara
3	DF	Júlia Belo	10 August 1997 (aged 27)	(East Timor Football Federation) AD SLB Laulara
4	DF	Idália Belo	21 May 1999 (aged 26)	(East Timor Football Federation) AD SLB Laulara
5	DF	Brigida da Costa	5 June 2000 (aged 25)	(East Timor Football Federation) Maranatha FC
6	DF	Godelivia Martins	7 December 1998 (aged 26)	(East Timor Football Federation) S'Amuser FC
13	DF	Grace Sim		
14	DF	Tasia Canizio	31 October 2004 (aged 20)	(East Timor Football Federation) Buibere FC
15	DF	Noemia Fernandes		
8	MF	Sonia Amaral	5 February 1997 (aged 28)	(East Timor Football Federation) AD SLB Laulara
10	MF	Vanessa Fernandes	11 February 1998 (aged 27)	(East Timor Football Federation) AD SLB Laulara
16	MF	Natalia Lawa		
18	MF	Astari Songge	30 April 2000 (aged 25)	(East Timor Football Federation) AD SLB Laulara
21	MF	Letizia Soares	14 June 2004 (aged 21)	(East Timor Football Federation) S'Amuser FC
7	FW	Dolores Costa	31 January 1991 (aged 34)	(East Timor Football Federation) S'Amuser FC
9	FW	Jessica Soares		
11	FW	Marcia Chaves	17 October 1988 (aged 36)	(East Timor Football Federation) Buibere FC
17	FW	Gradiana Avelina		
19	FW	Angela da Cruz		
22	FW	Elvira da Silva	25 August 1997 (aged 27)	(East Timor Football Federation) AD SLB Laulara
23	FW	Isabelita da Silva		

== See also ==
- 2025 ASEAN U-23 Championship squads
