= Joe Palatsides =

Australian soccer player (born 1965)

Personal information
- Full name: Iosif Joe Palatsides
- Date of birth: 2 July 1965 (age 61)
- Place of birth: Australia
- Position: Defender

Senior career*
Years	Team	Apps	(Gls)
1985–1988	Brunswick Juventus	64	(12)
1989	Footscray JUST	23	(4)
1990	South Melbourne FC	33	(5)
1991–1993	Heidelberg United	47	(5)
1993–1996	Apollon Kalamarias	12	(3)
1996–1997	PAOK	4	(0)
1998	Olympiacos Volos	12	(0)
1999	Poseidon Neas Michanionas	24	(0)

International career
1990	Australia	1	(0)

Managerial career
- 2000: Poseidon Michanionas
- 2000–2005: Kallikrateia Chalkidiki
- 2005: OFI Ierapetra
- 2006–2008: Kallikrateia Chalkidiki
- 2008–2009: Zakynthos
- 2010: Anagennisi Karditsa
- 2011: Apollon Kalamarias
- 2012: Moreland Zebras
- 2012–2019: Melbourne City FC (assistant)
- 2019–2021: Singapore (technical director)
- 2021-2024: Melbourne Victory FC Youth
- 2024-2025: Lyon Women (assistant)
- 2025–: Australia women (assistant)
- 2025–: Australia U-23 women
- * Club domestic league appearances and goals

Joe Palatsides (Greek: Ιωσήφ Παλατσίδης; born 7 July 1965) is a Greek Australian soccer manager and former player, who served as the head coach of the Melbourne Victory FC Youth. From mid-2025 he is the assistant coach of Australia women's team (Matildas) and head coach of the related U-23 Matildas.

== Playing career ==
A defender, Palatsides began his senior football career with Brunswick Juventus where he quickly became a first team regular, his best season coming in their relegation year where he played in every home-and-away game, scoring 11 goals. He signed with Footscray JUST in 1989, but they would also be relegated, and he eventually made the move to South Melbourne when the National Soccer League moved to the summer format. After two seasons, he transferred to rivals Heidelberg United, where he spent a further three seasons in Australia's top flight competition.

At 29, and with a wealth of senior football experience in Australia behind him, he tried his luck abroad in the country of his origin, firstly with Apollon Kalamarias in the Greek Super League. where he scored 3 goals in 12 appearances.

== Coaching career ==
Palatsides retired as a player in 2000 in order to become the manager of Poseidon Neas Michanionias and he had three wins and five losses in eight games played. He then joined Kallikratida Chalkidiki club in which he stayed about five years as manager of the club. He joined in 2005 OFI Ierapetra where he stayed about two months, from 4 October till 15 December, managing the team in Gamma Ethniki and winning nine out of nine matches. For personal causes he went back to Kallikrateia Chalkidiki club until 2008 when he took charge at Zakynthos. The club was promoted under his management to Gamma Ethniki for season 2008–09. He is also a member of the Australian Professional Footballers' Association (APFA) and he is one of the members that have served on the APFA Executive (with international honours).

On 2 May 2019, the Football Association of Singapore unveiled Joe Palatsides as its new technical director. Palatsides extended his contract in 2021, but ended his stint by mutual agreement citing the COVID-19 pandemic as well as health and personal issues on 9 November the same year. A day later, Palatsides joined Melbourne Victory's Youth Academy as a coach.

Palatsides departed Melbourne Victory in July 2024 in order to join Olympique Lyonnais Féminin as the assistant coach to fellow Australian, Joe Montemurro.

In June 2025 he joined Montemurro's coaching staff as an assistant for the Australia women's national soccer team (Matildas). He was appointed head coach of the related under-23 team (U23 Matildas) in July, which competed in the 2025 ASEAN Women's Championship in Vietnam from 6 to 19 August. On 30 July, Palatsides named his 23-player squad for that tournament. Although competing against senior national teams, the U23 Matildas won the championship with forward Holly Furphy awarded Most Valuable Player and midfielder Alana Jančevski as Rising Star of the tournament.
