= Chloe Lincoln =

Australian soccer player (born 2005)

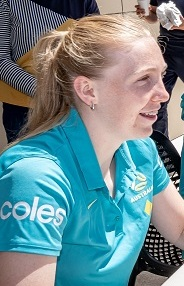
- Lincoln in 2024

Personal information
- Full name: Chloe Belle Lincoln
- Date of birth: 4 January 2005 (age 21)
- Place of birth: Armidale, New South Wales, Australia
- Height: 1.78 m (5 ft 10 in)
- Position: Goalkeeper

Team information
- Current team: Brisbane Roar
- Number: 1

Youth career
- Northern Inland
- Sydney University
- 2020: Football NSW Institute
- 2020–2021: Canberra United Academy

Senior career*
| Years | Team | Apps | (Gls) |
| 2021–2024 | Canberra United | 39 | (0) |
| 2024–2025 | Western United | 15 | (0) |
| 2025– | Brisbane Roar | 33 | (0) |

International career^{‡}
| 2022– | Australia U-20 | | |
| 2022– | Australia U-23 | 6 | (0) |
| 2024– | Australia | 5 | (0) |
- * Club domestic league appearances and goals as of 1 May 2025 ‡ National team caps and goals as of 6 March 2026

Chloe Belle Lincoln (born 4 January 2005) is an Australian professional soccer player who plays as a goalkeeper for A-League Women club Brisbane Roar and the Australia national team. She previously played for Canberra United and Western United.

== Early life ==
Lincoln was born in 2005, in Armidale, northern New South Wales. She was raised with two siblings by their parents, Jason and Alyssa Lincoln. She attended The Armidale School Junior School, St Mary's Primary School and then O'Connor Catholic College for secondary education. As a junior, Lincoln began playing soccer at the age of five for The Armidale School, Northern Inland Football (2013: under-9s, 2016: under-12s). She also played for Newcastle Jets Academy juniors.

As a youth Lincoln joined Sydney University and then Football NSW Institute (2020) in the National Premier Leagues NSW Women's, before joining Canberra United Academy (2020–2021).

== Club career ==
=== Canberra United ===
A product of the Canberra United Academy program, Lincoln joined Canberra United for the 2021–22 A-League Women season as scholarship player before being elevated to the senior playing group partway through the season. She had played 20 games for the academy by mid-2022.

Lincoln made her Canberra United seniors debut at 17 years of age as a 73rd-minute substitute against Perth Glory on 5 February 2022 after starting goalkeeper Keeley Richards had a knee injury. Her first starting appearance for Canberra United was against Wellington Phoenix a week later.

Lincoln was given a red card and sent off for the first time in her career in the 50th minute of Canberra United's 2–0 loss to Melbourne Victory on 16 December 2023. Anna Harrington for Australian Associated Press (AAP) observed, "[Lincoln] was rounded by Rachel Lowe and needlessly brought down the Victory playmaker just outside the 18-yard box."

On 31 May 2024, Lincoln confirmed her departure from Canberra United. Over her 39 matches for Canberra, from 2021-22 to 2023-24, she kept 9 clean sheets.

=== Western United ===
On 31 May 2024, Lincoln signed with Western United. Lincoln made her Western United debut against the Newcastle Jets on 23 November 2024. In June 2025, she departed the club at the conclusion of her contract.

=== Brisbane Roar ===
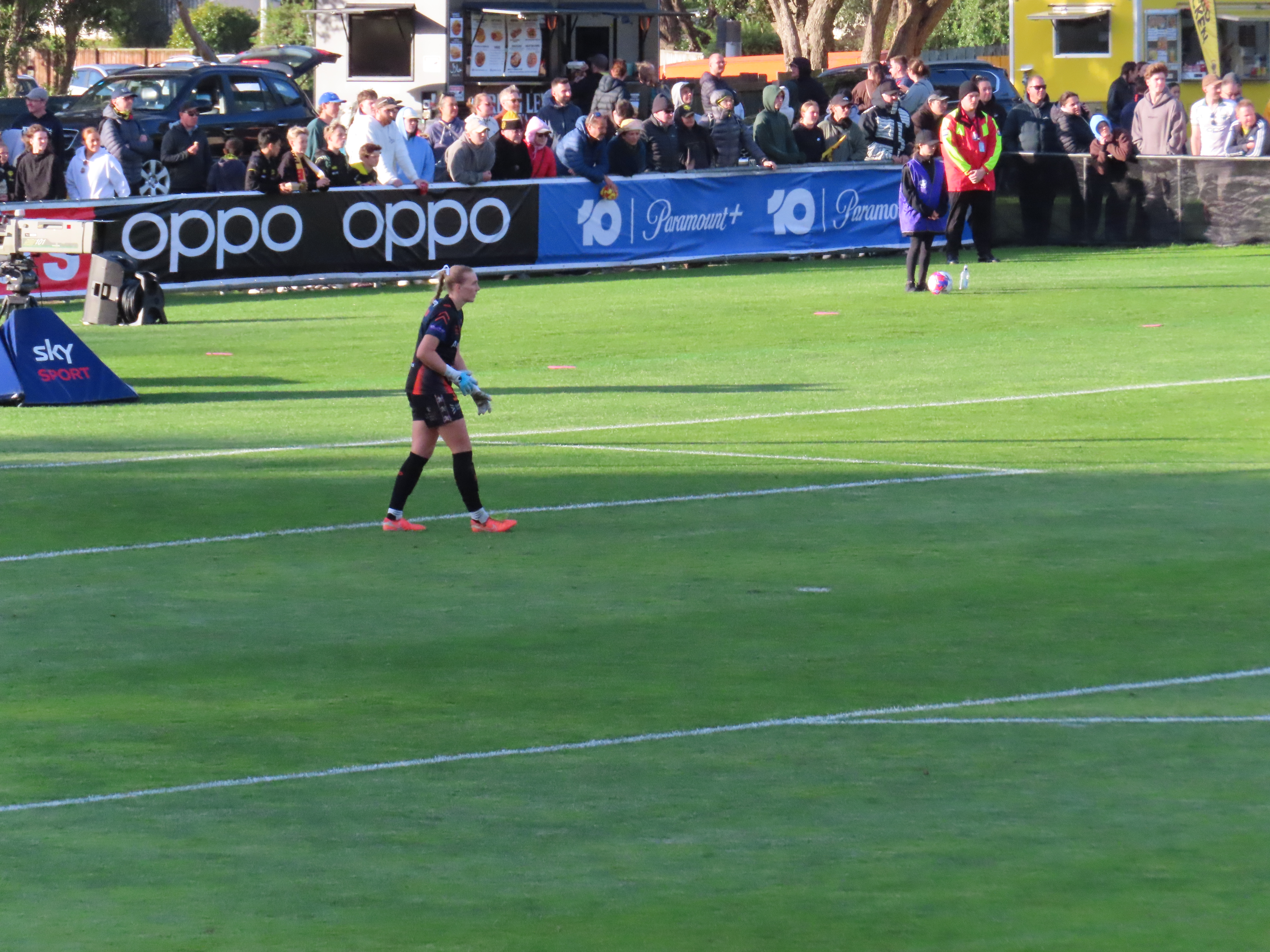
Lincoln playing for Brisbane Roar in 2026.

In June 2025, Lincoln signed with Brisbane Roar ahead of the 2025–26 season.

== International career ==
Lincoln, as a member of Australia women's national under-20 soccer team (Young Matildas), played at the 2022 FIFA U-20 Women's World Cup, the 2024 AFC U-20 Women's Asian Cup and the 2024 FIFA U-20 Women's World Cup. In August 2025 she was selected for the Australia U-23 squad, which competed against senior national teams in the 2025 ASEAN Women's Championship. Her team won 1–0 in the final against two-time champions Myanmar.

Lincoln received her first senior call-up for Australia's Matildas on 11 October 2024. She debuted on 7 December 2024, coming on as a 65th-minute substitute for Mackenzie Arnold against Chinese Taipei in an international friendly in Geelong in an eventual 6–0 win, becoming the first goalkeeper to debut for Australia since Teagan Micah in 2021. Lincoln acknowledged Arnold's assistance during their earlier training camps, "she has been really good at helping me get through [making mistakes] and pushing me to be better."

== Career statistics ==
=== International ===
As of match played 21 March 2026

Appearances and goals by national team and year
| National team | Year | Apps | Goals |
|---|---|---|---|
| Australia | 2024 | 1 | 0 |
| Australia | 2025 | 2 | 0 |
| Australia | 2026 | 2 | 0 |
| Total | | 5 | 0 |
