= Naomi Chinnama =

Australian soccer player (born 2004)

Naomi Thomas-Chinnama
Personal information
- Full name: Naomi Kai Thomas-Chinnama
- Date of birth: 13 May 2004 (age 22)
- Place of birth: Australia
- Height: 1.71 m (5 ft 7 in)
- Position: Centre-back

Senior career*
Years	Team	Apps	(Gls)
2020–2024	Melbourne City	43	(0)
2024–2026	Perth Glory	28	(1)

International career^{‡}
2022–	Australia U-20	22	(1)
2022–	Australia U-23	6	(0)
- * Club domestic league appearances and goals as of 5 June 2026 ‡ National team caps and goals as of 19 August 2025

Naomi Kai Thomas-Chinnama (Trinidadian Creole English: [naˈoːmi kaɪ tʃɪˈnɑːma]; born 13 May 2004) is an Australian soccer player who last played as a defender for Perth Glory in the A-League Women. She has previously played for Melbourne City. She represented Australia in the Australia U23, which won the 2025 ASEAN Women's Championship, competing against senior national teams.

== Club career ==
In 2021, Chinnama made her debut for Melbourne City in a 2–0 home loss against Sydney FC, coming on for Teigen Allen in the 72nd minute. In June 2024, Chinnama left Melbourne City at the end of her contract.

In August 2024, Chinnama joined Perth Glory.

In June 2026, Chinnama departed Perth Glory at the conclusion of her contract, after 28 appearances in which she scored once.

== International career ==
Born in Australia, Chinnama is of Trinidad and Tobago descent through her father and maternal grandparents. In 2022, she made her debut for the Young Matildas in a 5–1 win over New Zealand. Chinnama was a part of Australia's side at the 2022 FIFA U-20 Women's World Cup playing in all three games against Costa Rica, Brazil and Spain.

Thomas-Chinnama was selected for the Australia U23's team at the 2022 AFF Women's Championship, appearing in two games. She was a member of the 2025 squad, which won ASEAN Women's Championship (successor to the 2022 AFF Women's Championship) in August 2025.
