= Hoàng Thị Loan (footballer) =

Vietnamese footballer

Personal information
- Date of birth: 6 February 1995 (age 31)
- Place of birth: Thanh Oai, Hanoi, Vietnam
- Height: 1.58 m (5 ft 2 in)
- Positions: Midfielder; defender

Team information
- Current team: Hà Nội I
- Number: 8

Senior career*
Years	Team	Apps	(Gls)
2007–2014	Hà Nội II	68	(0)
2015–	Hà Nội I	92	(1)

International career^{‡}
2008–2011	Vietnam U16	8	(0)
2012–2014	Vietnam U20	3	(0)
2015–	Vietnam	46	(2)
- * Club domestic league appearances and goals ‡ National team caps and goals as of 29 September 2021

Hoàng Thị Loan (born 6 February 1995) is a Vietnamese footballer who plays as a defender for Women's Championship club Hà Nội I and the Vietnam women's national team.

== International goals ==
Scores and results list Vietnam's goal tally first.

No.	Date	Venue	Opponent	Score	Result	Competition
1.	5 July 2018	Bumi Sriwijaya Stadium, Palembang, Indonesia	Singapore	2–0	10–0	2018 AFF Women's Championship
2.	29 September 2021	Pamir Stadium, Dushanbe, Tajikistan	Tajikistan	6–0	7–0	2022 AFC Women's Asian Cup qualification
3.	9 August 2025	Lạch Tray Stadium, Hải Phòng, Vietnam	Indonesia	2–0	7–0	2025 ASEAN Women's Championship
