= Madison Casteen =

Thai-American soccer player (born 2007)

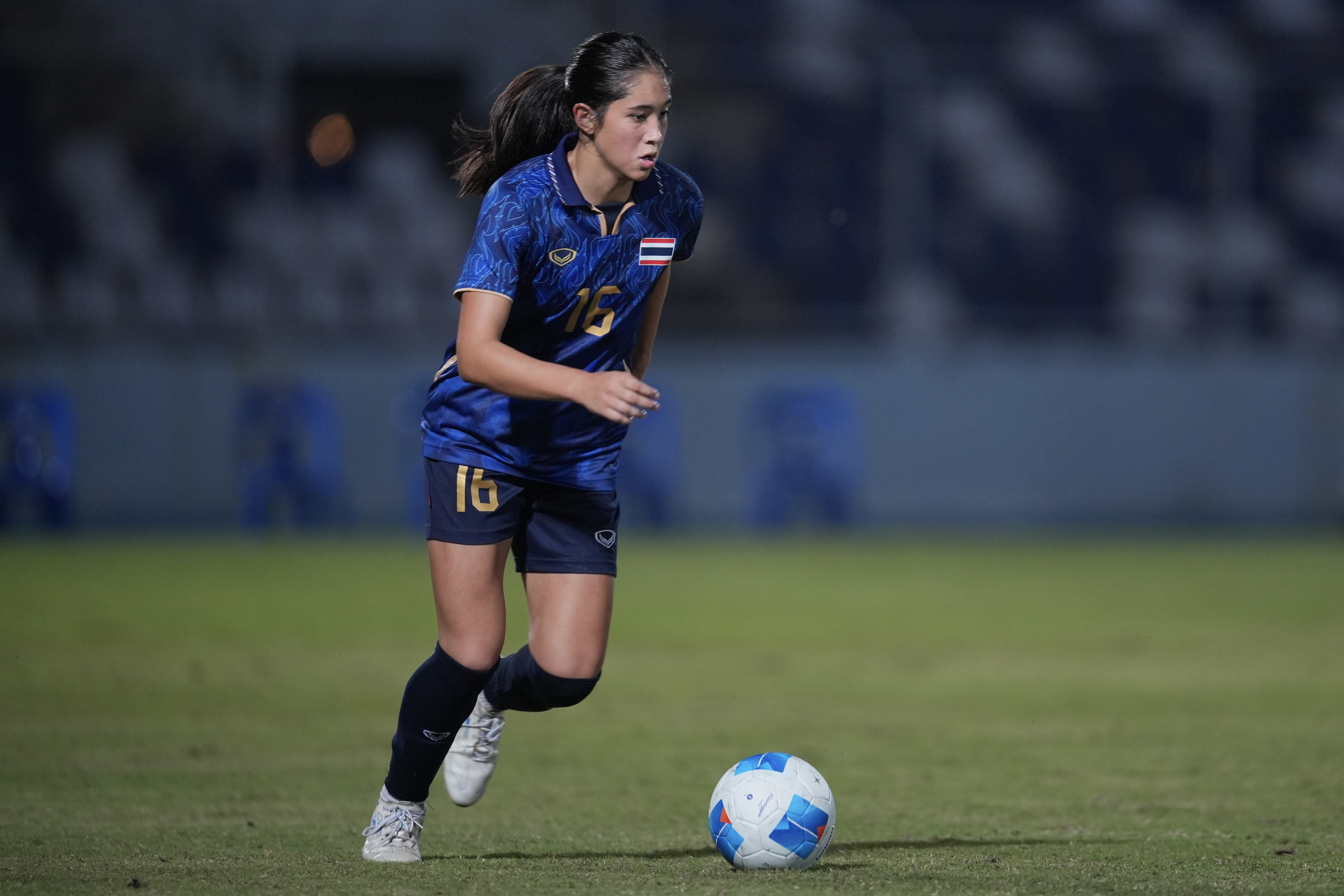

Personal information
- Full name: Madison Jade Casteen
- Date of birth: October 15, 2007 (age 19)
- Height: 5 ft 8 in (1.73 m)
- Positions: Midfielder; forward

Team information
- Current team: NC State Wolfpack
- Number: 9

Youth career
- 2015-2022: Piedmont Triad Football Club
- 2022-2024: North Carolina Fusion
- 2024-2026: North Carolina Courage

College career
| Years | Team | Apps | (Gls) |
| 2026– | NC State Wolfpack | | |

Senior career*
| Years | Team | Apps | (Gls) |
| 2026– | North Carolina Courage U23 | 5 | (3) |

International career^{‡}
| 2023–2024 | Thailand U-17 | 7 | (4) |
| 2025– | Thailand U-20 | 7 | (4) |
| 2025– | Thailand | 10 | (5) |
- * Club domestic league appearances and goals as of June 4, 2026 ‡ National team caps and goals as of April 12, 2026

Madison Jade Casteen (born October 15, 2007) is a college soccer player who plays as a midfielder or forward for the NC State Wolfpack. Born in the United States, she plays for the Thailand national team.

== Early life ==
Casteen grew up in High Point, North Carolina, and began playing soccer at age four. She attended Wesleyan Christian Academy, where she played soccer. She played club soccer for NC Fusion, earning ECNL all-conference honors, before joining the NC Courage Academy. Recognized as one of the top prospects in North Carolina's 2026 class, she committed to play college soccer for the NC State Wolfpack during her junior year. While in high school, she represented Thailand at youth international level and later earned selection to the senior national team.

== International career ==
Born in the United States to a Thai mother and an American father, Casteen represented Thailand at under-17 level during the build-up to the 2024 AFC U-17 Women's Asian Cup, scoring four goals in the qualification tournament. Her performances at youth level led to call-ups to Thailand's under-19, under-20, and senior national teams while still a teenager. At age 17, she became a regular starter for the senior national team and represented Thailand in the 2025 ASEAN Women's Championship, FIFA international friendlies, and the Southeast Asian Games. She made her senior international debut at the 2025 ASEAN Women's Championship, scoring in a 7–0 victory over Indonesia on 6 August 2025. A breakout star for Thailand, she scored two goals in a 7–0 victory over Cambodia on 9 August and was named the tournament's Yanmar Most Dynamic Player for the match after helping lead Thailand to the semi-finals and a fourth-place finish.

== NC Courage USLW statistics ==
| Season | Competition | Apps | Starts | Minutes | Goals | Assists |
|---|---|---|---|---|---|---|
| 2026 | USL W League | 7 | 7 | 582 | 3 | 4 |
| Career total | | 7 | 7 | 582 | 3 | 4 |

== USLW goal contributions ==
Scores and results list NC Courage's goal tally first.

| # | Date | Venue | Opponent | Minutes | Contribution | Score | Result | Competition |
|---|---|---|---|---|---|---|---|---|
| 1 | 13 May 2025 | WakeMed Soccer Park, Cary, North Carolina | Carolina Ascent FC | 72 | Goal | 3–0 | 6–0 | USL W League |
| 2 | 20 May 2025 | SEFL Soccer Complex, Columbia, South Carolina | SC United Bantams | 90 | Goal | 1–0 | 2–0 | USL W League |
| 3 | 23 May 2025 | UNCW Soccer Stadium, Wilmington, North Carolina | Port City FC | 90 | Assist | 2–2 | 3–2 | USL W League |
| 4 | 23 May 2025 | UNCW Soccer Stadium, Wilmington, North Carolina | Port City FC | 90 | Assist | 3–2 | 3–2 | USL W League |
| 5 | 3 June 2025 | WRAL Soccer Park, Raleigh, North Carolina | Wake FC | 90 | Assist | 1–0 | 5–0 | USL W League |
| 6 | 6 June 2025 | Hough High School, Cornelius, North Carolina | Carolina Ascent FC | 90 | Goal | 1–1 | 3–1 | USL W League |
| 7 | 6 June 2025 | Hough High School, Cornelius, North Carolina | Carolina Ascent FC | 90 | Assist | 3–1 | 3–1 | USL W League |

== International statistics ==
| Team | Apps | Goals | Assists |
|---|---|---|---|
| Thailand U17 | 7 | 4 | 1 |
| Thailand U20 | 7 | 4 | 4 |
| Thailand A-Team | 10 | 5 | 0 |
| Total | 24 | 13 | 5 |

== Senior Team - International Goals ==
Scores and results list Thailand's goal tally first.

| # | Date | Venue | Opponent | Score | Result | Competition |
|---|---|---|---|---|---|---|
| 1 | 6 August 2025 | Lạch Tray Stadium, Hải Phòng, Vietnam | Indonesia | 2–0 | 7–0 | 2025 ASEAN Women's Championship |
| 2 | 9 August 2025 | Lạch Tray Stadium, Hải Phòng, Vietnam | Cambodia | 1–0 | 7–0 | 2025 ASEAN Women's Championship |
| 3 | 9 August 2025 | Lạch Tray Stadium, Hải Phòng, Vietnam | Cambodia | 3–0 | 7–0 | 2025 ASEAN Women's Championship |
| 4 | 27 October 2025 | Chalerm Phrakiat Bang Mod Stadium, Bangkok, Thailand | Bangladesh | 3–1 | 5–1 | Friendly |
| 5 | 27 October 2025 | Chalerm Phrakiat Bang Mod Stadium, Bangkok, Thailand | Bangladesh | 4–1 | 5–1 | Friendly |
