= Emilia Makris =

Australian soccer player (born 2004)

Personal information
- Birth name: Emilia Murray
- Date of birth: 9 November 2004 (age 22)
- Place of birth: Wodonga, Victoria, Australia
- Positions: Forward; midfielder

Team information
- Current team: Adelaide United
- Number: 7

Senior career*
Years	Team	Apps	(Gls)
2018–2022	FSA NTC		
2021–2024	Adelaide United	29	(3)
2024–2025	Melbourne City	5	(0)
2025–	Adelaide United	0	(0)

International career^{‡}
2023–2024	Australia U20	6	(4)
2025–	Australia U23	3	(1)
- * Club domestic league appearances and goals as of 22 October 2025 ‡ National team caps and goals as of 19 August 2025

Emilia Makris (Greek: Εμίλια Μακρής, pronounced [eˈmi.li.a maˈkris]; born Emilia Murray, 9 November 2004) is an Australian soccer player, who has played as a forward or midfielder for Adelaide United and Melbourne City in the A-League Women. Internationally, Makris has represented the Australia Under-20s (Young Matildas) and Australia Under-23s. The latter squad won the 2025 ASEAN Women's Championship, competing against senior national teams.

== Early life ==
Makris was born in Wodonga, to Derek Murray, a Dhudhuroa and Yorta Yorta man and Lena Makris, who has Greek heritage. Her father is a former Port Adelaide player in the AFL, while her uncle Allan Murray is a former Port Adelaide and St Kilda AFL player. Makris was raised with older siblings and participated in "ballroom dancing, cricket, AFL, basketball, swimming, athletics and soccer". The family moved to Adelaide in 2014, where Makris later attended Henley High School. In late 2025 she changed her last name from Murray to Makris.

== Club career ==
Makris played for Football South Australia National Training Centre (FSA NTC) from 2018 to 2022, which competed in the National Premier Leagues South Australia (NPL SA) Womens. In 2019 she won a 70-metre sprint against fellow NPL SA women, which provided AU$10,000 for her club and AU$2,500 for herself. She signed with Adelaide United for the 2021–22 A-League Women season. During Adelaide's 2021-22 season, she made all ten of her appearances from the substitution bench. Her debut goal occurred during the following season, in November 2022, securing Adelaide's 1–0 win against Sydney. During 2023–24 season she played as a midfielder, appearing three times (all as a substitute), providing one goal. Her season was interrupted by an ankle injury. Over her first three seasons (2021–24) for Adelaide, Makris appeared 29 times and provided three goals.

Makris transferred to Melbourne City in July 2024 for their 2024–25 season. After winning the Premiership, Melbourne City qualified for the Championship finals but lost their semi-finals to Central Coast Mariners. Her team also qualified for the 2024–25 AFC Women's Champions League, where they finished second to Wuhan Jiangda. In September 2025, the club announced her departure by mutual termination after making nine appearances in all competitions. Makris returned to Adelaide United in September 2025, ahead of the 2025–26 A-League Women season, on a three-year contract.

== International career ==
Makris was named as a midfielder to the Australia women's national under-20s (Young Matildas) team's training camp in March 2022. As a forward she was appointed captain of the team for the 2022 Pacific Women's Four Nations Tournament, held in Canberra in November. Due to illness affecting six players, Papua New Guinea withdrew from Australia U20's third match and the Young Matildas fielded two teams for a substitute game. With two victories against the previous opponents, her team won the tournament.

She scored a brace in the team's first 2024 AFC U-20 Women's Asian Cup round 1 qualifier match against Guam, which resulted in a 13-0 victory, held in Kyrgyzstan in March 2023. Makris provided an additional goal in their 7–0 victory against the host team. In June of that year she helped the team defeat Vietnam 0–2 in the second round qualifiers held in Vietnam. She made the Young Matildas final squad in August 2024 for the FIFA U-20 Women's World Cup held in Bogotá, Colombia. However, in the following week, coach Leah Blayney announced that she had been withdrawn due to an injury and was replaced by Avaani Prakash.

As a forward, Makris was selected for Australia women's national under-23 soccer team (U23 Matildas) by coach Joe Palatsides to compete at the 2025 ASEAN Women's Championship held in August in Vietnam. Her team faced seniors from the ASEAN Football Federation (AFF). She scored a goal in her team's 9–0 win against Timor Leste to reach the semi-finals. U23 Matildas won the tournament final.

== Honours ==
International

- Australia U-23
  - ASEAN Women's Championship: Champions (2025)

Club

- Melbourne City FC: A-League Women Premiers (2024–25), Champions Semifinalists (2024–25); AFC Women's Champions League: Runners-up (2024–25)
