= 2025 ASEAN Women's Championship final =

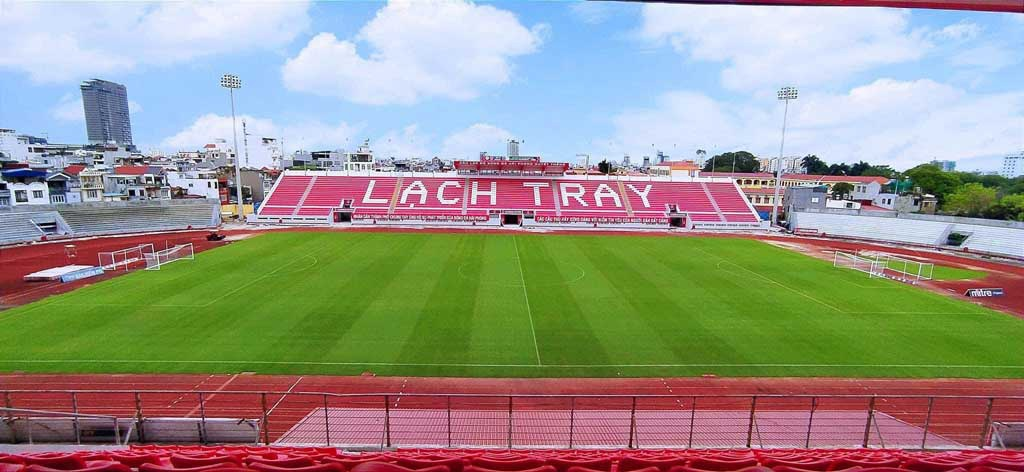
- Lạch Tray Stadium in Haiphong will host the final.
- Event: 2025 ASEAN Women's Championship
Myanmar	Australia U23
0	1
- Date: 19 August 2025
- Venue: Lạch Tray Stadium, Haiphong
- Referee: Yoshimi Yamashita (Japan)
- Attendance: 4,286

The 2025 ASEAN Women's Championship final is a football match that was held on 19 August 2025 at the Lạch Tray Stadium in Haiphong, Vietnam, which determined the winner of 2025 ASEAN Women's Championship. The final was contested by Myanmar and Australia U23.

== Route to the final ==
=== Myanmar ===
Myanmar route to the final
Match	Opponent	Result
1	Australia U23	2–1
2	Timor-Leste	3–0
3	Philippines	1–1
SF	Thailand	2–1

=== Australia ===
Australia route to the final
Match	Opponent	Result
1	Myanmar	1–2
2	Philippines	1–0
3	Timor-Leste	9–0
SF	Vietnam	2–1

== Match ==
=== Details ===
19 August 2025
20:00

Myanmar	0–1	Australia U23
	Report	Furphy 66'

Lạch Tray Stadium, Haiphong
Attendance: 4,286
Referee: Yoshimi Yamashita (Japan)

Match rules

- 90 minutes
- 30 minutes of extra time if necessary
- Penalty shoot-out if scores still level
- Maximum of twelve named substitutes
- Maximum of five substitutions, with a sixth allowed in extra time
- Maximum of three substitution opportunities, with a fourth allowed in extra time
