= Australia women's national under-23 soccer team =

National soccer team

Australia
- Nickname: U23 Matildas
- Association: Football Australia
- Confederation: AFC (Asia)
- Sub-confederation: AFF (Southeast Asia)
- Head coach: Joe Palatsides
- FIFA code: AUS
First colours	Second colours

First international
- Philippines 1–0 Australia U23 (Manila, Philippines, 4 July 2022)

Biggest win
- Australia U23 9–0 Timor-Leste (Phú Thọ, Vietnam, 13 August 2025)

Biggest defeat
- Sweden U23 3–0 Australia U23 (Sweden, 29 May 2024); Germany U23 3–0 Australia U23 (Sweden, 1 June 2024)

ASEAN Women's Championship
- Appearances: 2 (first in 2022)
- Best result: Champions (2025)
- Website: www.matildas.com.au

The Australia women's national under-23 soccer team represents Australia in international under-23 soccer and at the ASEAN Women's Championship. The team was established in mid-2022 and is controlled by the governing body for soccer in Australia, Football Australia (FA), which is currently a member of the Asian Football Confederation (AFC) and the regional ASEAN Football Federation (AFF) since leaving the Oceania Football Confederation (OFC) in 2006. The team's official nickname is the U23 Matildas.

== History ==
In mid-2022, Football Australia established the first-ever Australia women's national under-23 soccer team (U23 Matildas) to represent Australia in under-23 matches, including in the Asian Football Confederation (AFC). Senior women's assistant coach, Melissa Andreatta was appointed as inaugural under-23 Head Coach and Leah Blayney as Assistant Coach. In September 2019, the Australia women's national under-20 soccer team (Young Matildas) coach, Blayney had managed a squad to compete at the 2020 AFC U-23 Women's Championship.

Andreatta named a 28-player final squad for the 2022 AFF Women's Championship held from 4 to 17 July in the Philippines – against ASEAN senior national women's teams. Australia U23, captained by defender Charlotte Grant, were placed in Group A and their first match was a 1–0 defeat by the hosts, Philippines. The hosts were coached by former senior Australian women's coach, Alen Stajcic. Attacking midfielder, Amy Sayer kicked their first goal for the tournament during their second match in a 1–1 draw with Thailand. In their third game Sayer scored all four goals in the team's first ever win – against Indonesia. In the match against Malaysia, midfielder Mackenzie Hawkesby scored a hat trick. U23 Matildas finished third in their group.

Andreatta formed a 24-player squad for a two-game friendly series held in Varese, Italy in September 2023, where Australia U23 played against AC Milan Women and then Scotland U23. The next U23 Matildas squad contested the Four Nations invitational under-23 tournament held in Växjö, Sweden from 30 May to 4 June 2024. Australia, captained by midfielder Laura Hughes, lost against hosts, Sweden and visitors Germany, but won against visitors Poland. For that win, U23 Matildas came back from 2–0 down to equalise at 2–2, with the result determined by a penalty shoot-out, which Australia U23 won 5–3. Andreatta was appointed head coach of Scotland's senior women's team in April 2025.

Senior Matildas' assistant coach Joe Palatsides replaced Andreatta in June 2025 as the new Head Coach of the U23 Matildas. They competed at the 2025 ASEAN Women's Championship (successor to the 2022 AFF Women's Championship) in Group B in Phú Thọ, Vietnam, in August 2025. Palatsides described his squad on 30 July, "Some of these players have already had a taste of senior football while others are knocking on the door, but no matter where they are on their journey, this kind of experience is incredibly valuable." At the tournament the team finished second in their group after defeating defending champions Philippines 1–0 and fifth time appearing Timor-Leste 9–0. In the semi-final held in Haiphong they beat three-time champions and hosts, Vietnam 2–1 to advance to the tournament's final against two-time champions Myanmar who had beaten them 1–2 in the group stage. Australia U23 were crowned champions after their 1–0 victory, with the winner struck by Holly Furphy from an assist by Aideen Keane. Furphy was awarded Player of the Match for the final and Most Valuable Player for the tournament, while Alana Jančevski was Rising Star of the Tournament.

== Coaches ==
- (Australia) Melissa Andreatta (2022–2025)
- (Australia) Joe Palatsides (2025–present)

== Players ==
=== Current squad ===
The following 26 players were named to the squad for the U-23 Australian Women's National Team for a domestic training camp betwen 28 November and 5 December at The Home of the Matildas in Melbourne.

Caps and goals are current as of 19 August 2025, after match against Myanmar A.

No.	Pos.	Player	Date of birth (age)	Caps	Goals	Club
	GK	Ilona Melegh	2 August 2008 (age 18)	0	0	(Football Australia) Adelaide United
	GK	Georgia Ritchie		0	0	(Football Australia) Newcastle Jets
	DF	Sasha Grove	30 December 2004 (age 21)	4	0	(Football Australia) Canberra United
	DF	Emma Ilijoski	8 January 2003 (age 23)	0	0	(Danish Football Association) Odense Boldklub
	DF	Alana Jančevski	13 March 2003 (age 23)	5	3	(Football Australia) Melbourne Victory
	DF	Grace Johnston	7 April 2005 (age 21)	4	1	(The Football Association) Charlton Athletic
	DF	Jessika Nash	5 October 2004 (age 22)	1	0	(Football Australia) Melbourne City
	DF	Willa Pearson	24 December 2010 (age 15)	0	0	(Football Australia) Sydney FC
	DF	Ella Tonkin	14 December 2002 (age 23)	9	0	(Portuguese Football Federation) Torreense
	MF	Madeleine Caspers	15 March 2007 (age 19)	0	0	(Football Australia) Sydney FC
	MF	Georgia Cassidy	27 May 2005 (age 21)	3	0	(Football Australia) Perth Glory
	MF	Amy Chessari	19 May 2004 (age 22)	3	0	(Football Australia) Sydney FC
	MF	Sienna Dale	19 April 2007 (age 19)	0	0	(Football Australia) Canberra United
	MF	Bryleeh Henry	5 May 2003 (age 23)	3	0	(Swedish Football Association) Rosengård
	MF	Talia Kapetanellis	3 December 2004 (age 21)	0	0	(Football Australia) Central Coast Mariners
	MF	Zara Kruger	29 May 2006 (age 20)	0	0	(Football Australia) Brisbane Roar
	MF	Hana Lowry	23 April 2003 (age 23)	5	1	(Norwegian Football Federation) Vålerenga
	MF	Shelby McMahon	13 May 2008 (age 18)	0	0	(Football Australia) Melbourne City
	MF	Avaani Prakash	13 December 2006 (age 19)	0	0	(Football Australia) Melbourne City
	MF	Sienna Saveska	25 September 2006 (age 20)	0	0	(Football Australia) Melbourne Victory
	MF	Peta Trimis	18 May 2006 (age 20)	0	0	(Football Australia) Central Coast Mariners
	MF	Alicia Woods	18 January 2004 (age 22)	5	0	(Football Australia) Melbourne Victory
	MF	Talia Younis	26 October 2008 (age 18)	0	0	(Football Australia) Western Sydney Wanderers
	FW	Skye Halmarick	13 February 2008 (age 18)	0	0	(Football Australia) Central Coast Mariners
	FW	Ella O'Grady	14 September 2005 (age 21)	0	0	(Football Australia) Melbourne Victory
	FW	Annalise Rasmussen	22 May 2005 (age 21)	2	0	(French Football Federation) Toulouse

=== Recent call-ups ===
The following players were called up to the squad within the last 12 months and still remain eligible for selection.

Pos.	Player	Date of birth (age)	Caps	Goals	Club	Latest call-up
GK	Chloe Lincoln	4 January 2005 (age 21)	6	0	(Australia) Brisbane Roar	2025 ASEAN Women's Championship
GK	Tahlia Franco	29 June 2006 (age 20)	1	0	(Australia) Brisbane Roar	2025 ASEAN Women's Championship
DF	Alana Cerne	11 December 2002 (age 23)	4	1	Unattached	2025 ASEAN Women's Championship
DF	Claudia Cicco	27 August 2004 (age 22)	4	0	(Australia) Adelaide United	2025 ASEAN Women's Championship
DF	Naomi Chinnama	13 May 2004 (age 22)	6	0	Unattached	2025 ASEAN Women's Championship
DF	Tori Tumeth	5 October 2004 (age 22)	4	0	(Canada) Vancouver Rise	2025 ASEAN Women's Championship
FW	Emilia Makris	9 November 2004 (age 22)	3	1	(Australia) Adelaide United	2025 ASEAN Women's Championship

Notes

- ^{INJ} Withdrew due to an injury.

== Results and fixtures ==
The following is a list of match results in the last 12 months, as well as any future matches that have been scheduled.

Legend

Win Draw Loss Fixture

== Competitive record ==
=== ASEAN Women's Championship ===
ASEAN Women's Championship record
Year	Result	Position	Pld	W	D	L	GF	GA
(Vietnam) 2004	Did not enter							
(Vietnam) 2006	Did not enter							
(Myanmar) 2007	Did not enter							
(Vietnam) 2008	See Australia women's national soccer team							
(Laos) 2011	Did not enter							
(Vietnam) 2012	Did not enter							
(Myanmar) 2013	See Australia under-20 team							
(Vietnam) 2015	See Australia under-20 team							
(Myanmar) 2016	See Australia under-20 team							
(Indonesia) 2018	See Australia under-20 team							
(Thailand) 2019	Did not enter							
(Philippines) 2022	Group Stage	5th	5	3	1	1	16	4
(Vietnam) 2025	Champions	1st	5	4	0	1	14	3
Total	2/2	1 title	10	7	1	2	30	7

== Honours ==
=== Regional ===
- ASEAN Women's Championship
  - Winners (1): 2025

== See also ==
- Soccer in Australia
- Australia women's national soccer team
- Australia women's national under-20 soccer team
- Australia women's national under-17 soccer team
