= Alana Jančevski =

Australian soccer player

Personal information
- Date of birth: 13 March 2003 (age 23)
- Place of birth: Melbourne, Australia
- Positions: Forward; midfielder; defender

Team information
- Current team: Melbourne Victory
- Number: 66

Youth career
- 2008–2015: Bundoora United
- 2018–2019: FV Academy

Senior career*
Years	Team	Apps	(Gls)
2021–2022	Perth Glory	7	(2)
2022	Bulleen Lions	20	(9)
2022–2023	Perth Glory	18	(3)
2023	Bulleen Lions	16	(8)
2023–2024	Adelaide United	22	(1)
2024	Heidelberg United	15	(12)
2024–	Melbourne Victory	25	(5)

International career^{‡}
2018–2019	Australia U17	12	(8)
2025	Australia U23	5	(3)
- * Club domestic league appearances and goals as of 2 July 2025 ‡ National team caps and goals as of 19 August 2025

Alana Jančevski (Macedonian: Алана Јанчевски, pronounced [ˈa.la.na janˈt͡ʃɛfski] AH-lah-nah yan-CHEF-skee; born 13 March 2003) is an Australian soccer player. She plays as a forward for Melbourne Victory in the A-League Women. She has represented Australia with the Australia U17s and Australia U23s.

== Early life ==
Alana Jančevski was born in Melbourne, and raised with an older sibling by Silvana (primary school teacher) and Tony Jančevski (drafter), and is of Macedonian descent. Her father barracked for Melbourne Victory FC in the A-League and had played soccer for Victorian State League Division Three team, Pascoe Vale FC. She began playing soccer for Bundoora United from the age of five. For secondary education she attended St Monica's College, Epping. While at that school Jančevski played for FFV NTC (Football Federation Victoria National Training Centre) Juniors.

== Youth career ==
Her first soccer club was Bundoora United, as a left foot winger, where she played against boys, from the age of five until she was eleven. She was awarded Football Victoria's most valuable junior state team player in 2016. From 2018 to 2019 Jančevski was a member of the FFV NTC team, FV Academy/Emerging which competes in the National Premier Leagues Victoria Women (NPLW Victoria), where she played 56 games and provided 19 goals.

== Club career ==
At the 2019 AFC Women's Club Championship Jančevski debuted for Melbourne Victory in their 1–1 draw with Chinese team Jiangsu, in South Korea in November. In May 2021 she was signed by Alex Epakis to Perth Glory in the A-League Women for the 2021–22 season. The forward appeared seven times providing two goals. During the A-League off-season (middle of 2022) she was loaned to Bulleen Lions in the NPLW Victoria before returning to Perth Glory in September. In her second season for that team, she appeared in 18 matches for 3 goals. During 2023 A-League off-season, she was loaned again to Bulleen Lions.

Jančevski joined Adelaide United during the 2023–24 season. Over her 22 matches, she provided one goal. For the off-season she returned to the NPLW Victoria, but joined Heidelberg United, which had escaped relegation in the previous year. Over her 15 matches Jančevski kicked 12 goals, which helped Heidelberg reach the finals and win the grand final to become 2024 Champions. By the end of the 2024 season, she had played 116 games in the NPLW Victoria across her time (2017–2024) with Bulleen Lions, FV Emerging and Heidelberg United.

In August 2024 the player was transferred to Melbourne Victory for 2024–2025, where she initially took up offensive midfielder duties. After round eight, her coach Jeff Hopkins asked her to replace retiring full back, Beattie Goad, as a left back defender. In January 2025 she kicked the A-League Women Goal of the Year in their 2–0 win against Sydney. Melbourne Victory finished second behind Premiers, Melbourne City. Melbourne Victory reached the season's Grand Final and were drawn (1–1) with Central Coast Mariners after extra time, but they lost the resultant penalty shoot out (4–5) with Jančevski uncharacteristically missing her spot kick. In late August 2025, immediately after her international performances (see below), Jančevski was re-signed by Melbourne Victory for the 2025–26 season. She helped Victory reach the finals, where they lost the semi-final against local rivals, Melbourne City.

== International career ==
Jančevski was named to the Australia U17 (Junior Matildas) squad, which competed at 2019 AFC U-16 Women's Championship qualifiers (first round) held in Kyrgyzstan from 15 to 23 September 2018. She scored six goals across four matches; her team won all their games against Palestine (11–0), Indonesia (11-0), Kyrgyzstan (10–0, hosts) and Chinese Taipei (7-0). In the second round in Laos during March 2019, the Young Matildas won all three matches and qualified for 2019 AFC U-16 Women's Championship. At the final tournament from 15 to 28 September in Thailand, the forward scored two further goals in their win against the hosts (6–1), where she was awarded Most Valuable Player. The team reached the semi-finals and finished fourth.

The player was named to Australia women's national under-20 soccer team (Young Matildas) training camp from 30 May to 3 June 2022 in Blacktown, Sydney ahead of 2022 FIFA U-20 Women's World Cup in Costa Rica. However, she was not a member of the final 21-player squad in August. At the 2025 ASEAN Women's Championship in Vietnam in August, Jančevski, as a forward, joined the Australia U23 squad, which competed against senior national teams in Group B. She scored the winning goal in their match against Philippines, and two more in their 9–0 defeat of Timor Leste to reach the semi-finals. For her performances against both Philippines and Timor-Leste, she was awarded Player of the Match. Australia U23 were crowned champions after defeating Myanmar 1–0 in the final. Jančevski was named Rising Star of the Tournament.

== Honours ==
Regional

- ASEAN Women's Championship: Champions (2025)

Club

- Heidelberg United: NPLW Victoria Champions (2024)
- Melbourne Victory: League: Second (2024–25) Championship: Grand finalists (2024–25)

Individual

- Football Victoria: Most Valuable Player State Junior: (2016)
- AFC U-16 Women's Championship Australia U16 vs Thailand U16: Most Valuable Player (2019)
- A-League Women: Goal of the Year (2025)
- AFF ASEAN Women's Championship: Rising Star of the Tournament: 2025
  - Player of the Match: Australia U23 vs Philippines (10 August 2025)
  - Player of the Match: Australia U23 vs Timor-Leste (14 August 2025)
