= Kento Nishioka =

Japanese footballer (born 2008)

Kento Nishioka 西岡健斗
Personal information
- Date of birth: 14 July 2008 (age 18)
- Place of birth: Japan
- Height: 1.72 m (5 ft 8 in)
- Position: Midfielder

Team information
- Current team: Júbilo Iwata
- Number: 17

Youth career
- Júbilo Iwata

Senior career*
Years	Team	Apps	(Gls)
2025–	Júbilo Iwata	2	(0)

International career
- Japan U17
- * Club domestic league appearances and goals as of 14 August 2026

Kento Nishioka (西岡健斗, Nishioka Kento; born 14 July 2008) is a Japanese professional footballer who plays as a midfielder for J2 League club Júbilo Iwata.

== Club career ==
As a youth player, Nishioka joined the youth academy of Júbilo Iwata. In 2025, he was promoted to the club's senior team.

== International career ==
Nishioka is a Japan youth international. During September 2025, he played for the Japan national under-17 football team at the 27th International Youth Soccer in Niigata.

== Career statistics ==
As of 21 October 2026.

Appearances and goals by club, season and competition
Club	Season	League			National cup (Note: Includes Emperor's Cup)		League cup (Note: Includes J.League Cup)		Total	
Club	Season	Division	Apps	Goals	Apps	Goals	Apps	Goals	Apps	Goals
Júbilo Iwata	2025	J2 League	0	0	1	0	0	0	1	0
Júbilo Iwata	2026	J2/J3 (100)	2	0	–		–		2	0
Júbilo Iwata	2026–27	J2 League	0	0	0	0	1	0	1	0
Júbilo Iwata	Total		2	0	1	0	1	0	4	0
Career total			2	0	1	0	1	0	4	0

== Style of play ==
Nishioka plays as a midfielder. English newspaper The Guardian wrote in 2025 that he is "a metronomic midfielder capable of playing as a No 6, 8 or 10, Nishioka offers incisive passing together with excellent close control and ball-retention skills".
