= Holly Furphy =

Australian soccer player (born 2002)

Personal information
- Date of birth: 29 April 2002 (age 24)
- Place of birth: Melbourne, Australia
- Height: 1.78 m (5 ft 10 in)
- Position: Forward

Team information
- Current team: Melbourne Victory
- Number: 9

College career
| Years | Team | Apps | (Gls) |
| 2022–2024 | Santa Clara | 36 | (4) |

Senior career*
| Years | Team | Apps | (Gls) |
| 2016–2021 | Senior NTC | 73 | (22) |
| 2025– | Melbourne Victory | 37 | (5) |

International career^{‡}
| 2022 | Australia U20 | 1 | (0) |
| 2025 | Australia U23 | 5 | (4) |
- * Club domestic league appearances and goals as of 19 May 2026 ‡ National team caps and goals as of 19 August 2025

Holly Furphy (born 29 April 2002) is an Australian soccer player. She plays as a forward for Melbourne Victory in the A-League Women. Upon debut, during the 2024–25 season, she scored her first goal. In May 2025, Melbourne Victory were runners-up in the grand final to champions, Central Coast Mariners. Furphy has represented Australia in the Australia U-20s (Young Matildas) and Australia U-23s. The latter team won the 2025 ASEAN Women's Championship and she was awarded Most Valuable Player of the tournament.

== Early life ==
Furphy was born in Melbourne in 2002, to Liza Alpers and Richard Furphy and grew up with two brothers. Alpers is a former diver, who won national titles. Furphy's father is a former Victorian Amateur Football Association player. Her older brother, Joe is a former Geelong AFL reserves player. Younger brother, Johnny, is a professional basketballer for the Indiana Pacers in America's NBA. She began playing soccer for Yarra Jets juniors (Victorian State League Division 4 East) as a ten-year-old. At 13 she joined the Football Federation Victoria National Training Centre (FFV NTC) in 2016. She attended Maribyrnong College as a secondary student. For tertiary studies Furphy attended California's Santa Clara University, under a sports scholarship, from 2022 and started an Environmental Science Degree.

== Youth career ==
In 2016 Furphy was a member of Victoria's Under-15 girls soccer team at the National Youth Championships for Girls, which won the tournament contested by seven other state/regional teams. As a teenager, Furphy was a train-on player for Melbourne Victory in 2020. She relocated to Santa Clara, playing for their soccer team from 2022, as part of the American college soccer system's NCAA Division I women's soccer tournament. Furphy's first season was interrupted after five matches by an ACL injury, "[it was a] bit of a set back for me and made me really reflect on what I want to do really because of not playing for 10 months and trying to work my way back to what I was, in that moment I decided to become a different player." After recovery, the second season resulted in 18 matches and two goals. In her third and final season, the forward kicked two goals in 13 matches.

== Club career ==
Furphy played for an FFV NTC side, Senior NTC/FV Emerging, in the NPLW Victoria from 2016 to 2021, both 2020 and 2021 seasons were cancelled due to COVID-19 pandemic. After three years in Santa Clara, Furphy returned to Australia and signed with Melbourne Victory in 2024–25 mid-season as an injury replacement for Paige Zois on 24 January 2025. Her first game was against Sydney, where she scored her debut goal nine minutes after being subbed on, which resulted in their 2–0 win. On 18 May Furphy participated in Melbourne Victory's Grand Final against Central Coast Mariners, which finished in a 1–1 draw after extra time. In the ensuing penalty shootout, she converted her spot kick, but her team lost 5–4.

Immediately after her international performances (see below) Furphy, in late August 2025, was re-signed by Melbourne Victory for the 2025–26 season. She appeared in all 20 matches of the regular season scoring 2 goals to help Victory reach sixth and qualify for the finals, where the lost the semi-final against local rivals, Melbourne City.

== International career ==
Furphy was selected for the Australia women's national under-20 soccer team (Young Matildas), 24-Player squad's training camp for 1–4 October 2019 in Sydney. She joined another Young Matildas training camp from 30 May to 3 June 2022 in Sydney. Subsequently Young Matildas coach Leah Blayney selected her for a friendly match against New Zealand on 12 June 2022. Due to an ACL injury in Santa Clara, she was unavailable for the Young Matildas campaign to the 2022 FIFA U-20 Women's World Cup in Costa Rica in August. Furphy joined the 23-player squad for the Australia women's national under-23 soccer team (U23 Matildas), which competed at the 2025 ASEAN Women's Championship in Vietnam from 6 to 19 August. She scored the team's first goal of the tournament in their 2–1 loss against Myanmar on 7 August, and two more in their 9–0 defeat of Timor Leste to reach the semi-finals. In the final of the tournament, Furphy scored the only goal giving Australia U23 the trophy. Consequently she was awarded Player of the Match for the final and Most Valuable Player of the tournament.

== Honours ==
Regional

- ASEAN Women's Championship: Champions (2025)

Club

- A-League Women Champions: Runners-up (2024–25)

Individual

- 2025 ASEAN Women's Championship: Most Valuable Player
  - Final: Player of the Match
