= 2025 ASEAN Women's Championship =

Southeast Asia women's football competition

Giải vô địch bóng đá nữ ASEAN 2025 (Vietnamese)

Tournament details
- Host country: Vietnam
- Dates: 6–19 August
- Teams: 8 (from 1 sub-confederation)
- Venues: 2 (in 2 host cities)

Final positions
- Champions: Australia U23 (1st title)
- Runners-up: Myanmar
- Third place: Vietnam
- Fourth place: Thailand

Tournament statistics
- Matches played: 16
- Goals scored: 66 (4.13 per match)
- Top scorer: (Myanmar) Win Theingi Tun (7 goals)
- Best player: (Australia) Holly Furphy
- Best goalkeeper: (Myanmar) Myo Mya Mya Nyein

The 2025 ASEAN Women's Championship (also called the ASEAN MSIG Serenity Cup 2025 for sponsorship reasons) was the 13th edition of the ASEAN Women's Championship (previously known as the AFF Women's Championship), an international women's football tournament organised by the ASEAN Football Federation (AFF). This event was the first time a qualification tournament, the 2024 AFF Women's Cup, was held before the championship, and the first where a video assistant referee was used (in the knockout stage only).

The Philippines were the defending champions, but were eliminated in the group stage.

The Championship was won by the Australia U23, their first title.

== Qualification ==
The top five teams from the 2022 AFF Women's Championship automatically qualified for the 2025 edition. Indonesia, Cambodia, and Singapore, the top three teams of the 2024 AFF Women's Cup held in Laos also qualified.

Singapore later withdrew from the tournament due to overlapping fixtures, to be replaced by Timor-Leste. The Australia U23 represented Australia for the second consecutive time.

=== Qualified teams ===
Team	Appearance	Previous best performance
Australia U23	2nd	Group stage (2022) (Note: Australia has also been represented in this competition by: their senior team (one appearance; best performance: Champions (2008); the U20 team (four appearances; best performance: Runners-up (2013, 2018)))
Cambodia	4th	Group stage (2018, 2019)
Indonesia	10th	Fourth place (2004)
Myanmar	13th	Champions (2004, 2007)
Philippines	12th	Champions (2022)
Timor-Leste	5th	Group stage (2016, 2018, 2019, 2022)
Thailand	12th	Champions (2011, 2015, 2016, 2018)
Vietnam	13th	Champions (2006, 2012, 2019)

== Draw ==
The draw was held on 9 June 2025 at Hanoi, Vietnam in 10:00 (ICT).

=== Seeding ===
The seeding was based on the 2022 AFF Women's Championship and 2024 AFF Women's Cup final rankings during the draw.

Pot 1	Pot 2
Vietnam (H); Philippines	Thailand; Myanmar
Pot 3	Pot 4
Australia U23; Indonesia	Cambodia; Timor-Leste

=== Groups ===
Group A
Pos	Team
A1	Vietnam
A2	Thailand
A3	Indonesia
A4	Cambodia

Group B
Pos	Team
B1	Philippines
B2	Myanmar
B3	Australia U23
B4	Timor-Leste

== Squads ==
Each national team had to submit a squad of 23 players, including three goalkeepers.

== Match officials ==
=== Referees ===
- (China) Yu Hong
- (China) Mu Mingxin
- (Malaysia) Razlan Joffri Ali
- (Malaysia) Izzul Fikri Kamaruzaman
- (Japan) Yoshimi Yamashita
- (South Korea) Kim Yu-jeong
- (Thailand) Songkran Bunmeekiart
- (Uzbekistan) Rustam Lutfullin
- (Uzbekistan) Asker Nadjafaliev
- (Vietnam) Nguyễn Mạnh Hải

=== Assistant referees ===
- (China) Wen Lili
- (China) Wu Qiaoli
- (Japan) Makoto Bozono
- (Malaysia) Arif Shamil Abdul Rasid
- (Malaysia) Abdul Hannan Abdul Hasim
- (Malaysia) Farhan Abdul Aziz
- (Philippines) Merlo Silva Albano
- (Thailand) Nuannid Donjangreed
- (Thailand) Suphawarn Hinthong
- (Vietnam) Phan Huy Hoàng

=== Video assistant officials ===
- (Thailand) Sivakorn Pu-udom
- (China) Jin Jingyuan

== Venues ==
Indonesia was originally named as the host of the tournament. However, due to conflicting schedules with the 2025 ASEAN U-16 Women's Championship, Indonesia withdrew their hosting rights. As the result, the ASEAN Football Federation chose Vietnam as the new host nation, with matches held in Haiphong and Phú Thọ.

Phú Thọ	2025 ASEAN Women's Championship is located in Vietnam	Haiphong
Việt Trì Stadium	2025 ASEAN Women's Championship is located in Vietnam	Lạch Tray Stadium
Capacity: 20,000	2025 ASEAN Women's Championship is located in Vietnam	Capacity: 30,000

== Schedule ==
Schedule
Round	Matchday	Date
Group stage	Matchday 1	6–7 August 2025
Group stage	Matchday 2	9–10 August 2025
Group stage	Matchday 3	12–13 August 2025
Knockout stage	Semi-finals	16 August 2025
Knockout stage	Third place play-off	19 August 2025
Knockout stage	Final	19 August 2025

== Group stage ==
=== Tiebreakers ===
In the group stage, teams were ranked according to points (3 points for a win, 1 point for a draw, 0 points for a loss), and if tied on points, the following tiebreaking criteria were applied, in the order given, to determine the rankings:

1. Points in head-to-head matches among tied teams;
2. Goal difference in head-to-head matches among tied teams;
3. Goals scored in head-to-head matches among tied teams;
4. If more than two teams are tied, and after applying all head-to-head criteria above, a subset of teams are still tied, all head-to-head criteria above are reapplied exclusively to this subset of teams;
5. Goal difference in all group matches;
6. Goals scored in all group matches;
7. Lower disciplinary points (red card = 3 points, yellow card = 1 point, expulsion for two yellow cards in one match = 3 points);

However, these criteria would not apply if two teams tied on points, goal difference and goals scored drew against each other in their final group match, and no other team in the group finishes with the same number of points; in that case, the tie would be broken by a penalty shootout.

All times were local, ICT (UTC+7).

=== Group A ===
Pos	Team	Pld	W	D	L	GF	GA	GD	Pts	Qualification
1	Vietnam (H)	3	3	0	0	14	0	+14	9	Advance to knockout stage
2	Thailand	3	2	0	1	14	1	+13	6	Advance to knockout stage
3	Cambodia	3	0	1	2	1	14	−13	1	
4	Indonesia	3	0	1	2	1	15	−14	1	

Source: ASEAN United FC
Rules for classification: Group stage tiebreakers
(H) Hosts
6 August 2025
16:30

Thailand	7–0	Indonesia
Kanjanathat 6', 21'; Casteen 19'; Pichayatida 40'; Janista 41'; Pinyaphat 71'; Thawanrat 72'	Report

Lạch Tray Stadium, Haiphong
Referee: Razlan Joffri Ali (Malaysia)
6 August 2025
19:30

Vietnam	6–0	Cambodia
Dương Thị Vân 7'; Ngân Thị Vạn Sự 11'; Phạm Hải Yến 14' (pen.); Nguyễn Thị Vạn 17'; Nguyễn Thị Trúc Hương 51'; Thái Thị Thảo 60'	Report

Lạch Tray Stadium, Haiphong
Referee: Izzul Fikri Kamaruzaman (Malaysia)

9 August 2025
16:30

Cambodia	0–7	Thailand
	Report	Casteen 38', 45+2'; Janista 40', 47', 90'; Thawanrat 70'; Ploychompoo 81'

Lạch Tray Stadium, Haiphong
Referee: Rustam Lutfullin (Uzbekistan)
9 August 2025
19:30

Indonesia	0–7	Vietnam
	Report	Nguyễn Thị Bích Thùy 25'; Hoàng Thị Loan 28'; Phạm Hải Yến 69', 85'; Ngân Thị Vạn Sự 71'; Trần Thị Thu Thảo 81'; Nguyễn Thị Tuyết Dung 89'

Lạch Tray Stadium, Haiphong
Referee: Asker Nadjafaliev (Uzbekistan)

12 August 2025
19:40

Vietnam	1–0	Thailand
Trần Thị Thu Thảo 36'	Report

Lạch Tray Stadium, Haiphong
Referee: Rustam Lutfullin (Uzbekistan)
12 August 2025
19:30

Indonesia	1–1	Cambodia
Rosdilah 82'	Report	Saody 76'

Việt Trì Stadium, Phú Thọ
Referee: Yu Hong (China)

=== Group B ===
Pos	Team	Pld	W	D	L	GF	GA	GD	Pts	Qualification
1	Myanmar	3	2	1	0	6	2	+4	7	Advance to knockout stage
2	Australia U23	3	2	0	1	11	2	+9	6	Advance to knockout stage
3	Philippines	3	1	1	1	8	2	+6	4	
4	Timor-Leste	3	0	0	3	0	19	−19	0	

Source: ASEAN United FC
Rules for classification: Group stage tiebreakers
7 August 2025
16:30

Myanmar	2–1	Australia U23
May Thet Mon Myint 32'; Win Theingi Tun 47'	Report	Furphy 84'

Việt Trì Stadium, Phú Thọ
Referee: Yoshimi Yamashita (Japan)
7 August 2025
19:30

Philippines	7–0	Timor-Leste
Schinaman 2'; Quezada 7', 32'; Long 9'; Tolentin 57', 64'; Wyrzynski 75'	Report

Việt Trì Stadium, Phú Thọ
Referee: Songkran Bunmeekiart (Thailand)

10 August 2025
16:30

Timor-Leste	0–3	Myanmar
	Report	Win Theingi Tun 44', 55', 62'

Việt Trì Stadium, Phú Thọ
Referee: Nguyễn Mạnh Hải (Vietnam)
10 August 2025
19:30

Australia U23	1–0	Philippines
Jančevski 45+1'	Report

Việt Trì Stadium, Phú Thọ
Referee: Yoshimi Yamashita (Japan)

13 August 2025
19:30

Philippines	1–1	Myanmar
Mathelus 71'	Report	Win Theingi Tun 33' (pen.)

Lạch Tray Stadium, Haiphong
Referee: Asker Nadjafaliev (Uzbekistan)
13 August 2025
19:30

Australia U23	9–0	Timor-Leste
Furphy 2', 30'; Jančevski 11', 46'; Johnston 44'; Murray 58'; McKenna 62'; Keane 79'; Brigida 82' (o.g.)	Report

Việt Trì Stadium, Phú Thọ
Referee: Mu Mingxin (China)

== Knockout stage ==
All times are local, ICT (UTC+7).

=== Bracket ===
Semi-finals
16 August — Haiphong
Myanmar	2
Thailand	1
16 August — Haiphong
Vietnam	1
Australia U23	2

Final
19 August — Haiphong
Myanmar	0
Australia U23	1
Third place play-off
19 August — Haiphong
Thailand	1
Vietnam	3

=== Semi-finals ===
16 August 2025
16:00

Myanmar	2–1	Thailand
Win Theingi Tun 13', 72' (pen.)	Report	Wiranya 6'

Lạch Tray Stadium, Haiphong
Referee: Kim Yu-jeong (South Korea)
16 August 2025
20:00

Vietnam	1–2	Australia U23
Nguyễn Thị Bích Thùy 88'	Report	Keane 7'; McKenna 16'

Lạch Tray Stadium, Haiphong
Attendance: 16,890
Referee: Yoshimi Yamashita (Japan)

=== Third place play-off ===
19 August 2025
16:30

Thailand	1–3	Vietnam
Wiranya 87'	Report	Phạm Hải Yến 45'; Huỳnh Như 65'; Nguyễn Thị Bích Thùy 68'

Lạch Tray Stadium, Haiphong
Attendance: 11,978
Referee: Kim Yu-jeong (South Korea)

=== Final ===
19 August 2025
20:00

Myanmar	0–1	Australia U23
	Report	Furphy 66'

Lạch Tray Stadium, Haiphong
Attendance: 4,286
Referee: Yoshimi Yamashita (Japan)

== Statistics ==
=== Tournament ranking ===
Pos	Team	Pld	W	D	L	GF	GA	GD	Pts	Final result
1	Australia U23	5	4	0	1	14	3	+11	12	Champions
2	Myanmar	5	3	1	1	8	4	+4	10	Runners-up
3	Vietnam	5	4	0	1	18	3	+15	12	Third place
4	Thailand	5	2	0	3	16	6	+10	6	Fourth place
5	Philippines	3	1	1	1	8	2	+6	4	Eliminated in group stage
6	Cambodia	3	0	1	2	1	14	−13	1	Eliminated in group stage
7	Indonesia	3	0	1	2	1	15	−14	1	Eliminated in group stage
8	Timor-Leste	3	0	0	3	0	19	−19	0	Eliminated in group stage

Source: ASEAN United FC

=== Goalscorers ===
There were 66 goals scored in 16 matches, for an average of 4.12 goals per match.

7 goals

- (Myanmar) Win Theingi Tun

4 goals

- (Australia) Holly Furphy
- (Thailand) Janista Jinantuya
- (Vietnam) Phạm Hải Yến

3 goals

- (Australia) Alana Jančevski
- (Thailand) Madison Casteen
- (Vietnam) Nguyễn Thị Bích Thùy

2 goals

- (Australia) Aideen Keane
- (Australia) Leticia McKenna
- (Philippines) Quinley Quezada
- (Philippines) Dionesa Tolentin
- (Thailand) Kanjanathat Poomsri
- (Thailand) Thawanrat Promthongmee
- (Thailand) Wiranya Kwaenkasikarm
- (Vietnam) Ngân Thị Vạn Sự
- (Vietnam) Trần Thị Thu Thảo

1 goal

- (Australia) Grace Johnston
- (Australia) Emilia Murray
- (Cambodia) Hok Saody
- (Indonesia) Rosdilah Nurrohmah
- (Myanmar) May Thet Mon Myint
- (Philippines) Hali Long
- (Philippines) Nina Mathelus
- (Philippines) Aaliyah Schinaman
- (Philippines) Adelaide Wyrzynski
- (Thailand) Pinyaphat Klinklai
- (Thailand) Pichayatida Manowang
- (Thailand) Ploychompoo Somnuek
- (Vietnam) Dương Thị Vân
- (Vietnam) Hoàng Thị Loan
- (Vietnam) Nguyễn Thị Trúc Hương
- (Vietnam) Nguyễn Thị Tuyết Dung
- (Vietnam) Nguyễn Thị Vạn
- (Vietnam) Thái Thị Thảo
- (Vietnam) Huỳnh Như

1 own goal

- (Timor-Leste) Brigida da Costa (against Australia)

=== Awards ===
- Rising star of the tournament: (Australia) Alana Jančevski
- Best goalkeeper: (Myanmar) Myo Mya Mya Nyein
- Top goalscorer: (Myanmar) Win Theingi Tun (7 goals)
- Most valuable player: (Australia) Holly Furphy
- Player of the Match (Final): (Australia) Holly Furphy
- Player of the Match (Third place playoff): (Vietnam) Huỳnh Như

Ref.

== Broadcasting rights ==
2025 ASEAN Women's Championship television broadcasters in Southeast Asia
Country	Broadcaster	TV	Online	Ref.
Australia	FPT	—N/a	YouTube: FPT Bóng Đá Việt	
Brunei	YouTube, Facebook	—N/a	YouTube: ASEAN United FC; Facebook: ASEAN United FC	
Cambodia	Bayon Television	Bayon Television	Facebook: BTV Sport	
Indonesia	Media Nusantara Citra	RCTI, GTV, iNews, Sportstar	Vision+	
Laos	BG Sports Co., YouTube, Facebook	—N/a	YouTube: ASEAN United FC BG SPORTS; Facebook: ASEAN United FC	
Malaysia	Astro	Astro Arena	Astro Go, Sooka	
Philippines	The Philippine Football Federation Social Media	—N/a	YouTube: The Philippine Football Federation; Facebook: The Philippine Football Federation	
Myanmar	Sky Net, BG Sports Co., YouTube, Facebook	Sky Net Sports HD, Sky Net Sports 4	YouTube: ASEAN United FC BG SPORTS; Facebook: ASEAN United FC	
Singapore	Mediacorp	—N/a	meWATCH	
Thailand	RTA Channel 5, BG Sports Co., AIS Play, TrueVisions	RTA Ch5HD, True Sports 2	YouTube: Changsuek BG SPORTS; Facebook: Thai Women’s Football; Online Platforms: AIS Play, TrueVisions Now	
Timor Leste	YouTube, Facebook	—N/a	YouTube: ASEAN United FC; Facebook: ASEAN United FC	
Vietnam	FPT, VTV	VTV5, VTV7	FPT Play	
2025 ASEAN Women's Championship international television broadcasters
South Korea	Eclat Media Group	SPOTV	SPOTV Now	
Rest of the World	YouTube, Facebook, OneFootball (Except APAC)	—N/a	YouTube: ASEAN United FC; Facebook: ASEAN United FC; OneFootball	

== See also ==
- 2025 ASEAN U-19 Women's Championship
- 2025 ASEAN U-16 Women's Championship
