= Yoshimi Yamashita =

Japanese football referee

Yoshimi Yamashita 山下 良美
- Full name: Yoshimi Yamashita
- Born: 20 February 1986 (age 40); Tokyo, Japan

Domestic
Years	League	Role
2021–	J3 League	Referee
2022–	J1 League, J2 League	Referee

International
Years	League	Role
2015–	FIFA listed	Referee

Yoshimi Yamashita (山下良美, born 20 February 1986) is a Japanese football referee. She was an official at the 2019 FIFA Women's World Cup in France and also refereed at the 2020 and 2024 Summer Olympics.

== Career ==
In 2022, she was one of six women referees selected to officiate at the 2022 FIFA World Cup in Qatar, and one of the first three women appointed as potential center referees in men's World Cup history alongside Stephanie Frappart and Salima Mukansanga. She made her FIFA World Cup debut as fourth official in the Group F match against Belgium against Canada, and was the fourth official in six World Cup matches.

Also during 2022, Yamashita became the first female referee to officiate a game in both the men's AFC Champions League and the J1 League, taking charge in Melbourne City's 2–1 win over Chunnam Dragons and FC Tokyo's 2–0 win over Kyoto Sanga respectively. This also made her the first woman to officiate at a top division match in the J-League.

On 19 July 2023, Yamashita served as the center official for the opening group-stage match of the 2023 FIFA Women's World Cup between Norway and co-hosts New Zealand women's national football team. The match featured a penalty kick awarded by video assistant referee review, and Yamashita delivered the first in-stadium explanation of a video-reviewed decision in the history of women's international football.

In January 2024, she became the first woman to referee at the Asian Cup.

Yamashita was chosen to be a referee at the 2024 Summer Olympics. She was assigned the opening round Group C match Egypt and Dominican Republic.
