= Lạch Tray Stadium =

Multi-sports stadium in Vietnam

Sân vận động Lạch Tray
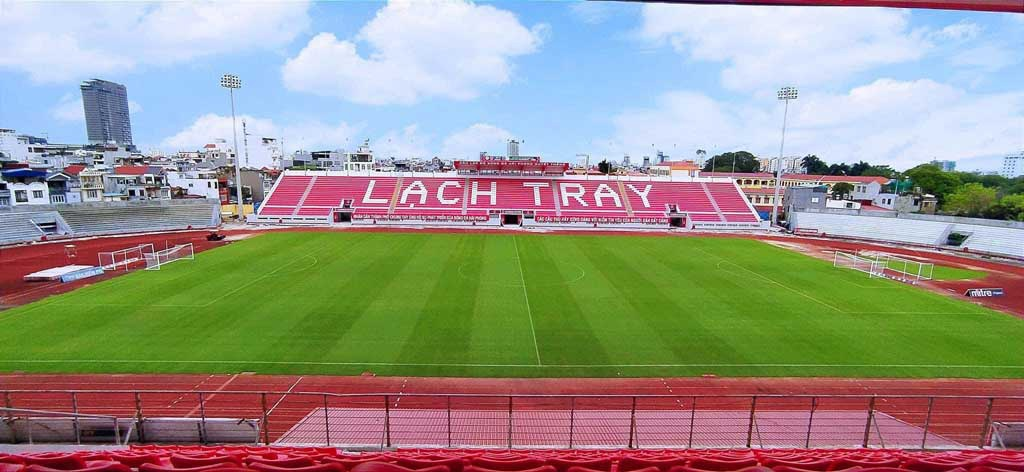
- Interactive map of Sân vận động Lạch Tray
- Full name: Lạch Tray Stadium
- Former names: Central Stadium
- Location: 15 Lach Tray Street, Ngô Quyền District, Hai Phong, Vietnam
- Coordinates: 20°51′06″N 106°41′19″E
- Capacity: 30,000
- Surface: Bermuda grass
- Field size: 105 m × 68 m (344 ft × 223 ft)

Construction
- Built: 1957
- Opened: 1958
- Renovated: 1977, 1995, 2001, 2003, 2013, 2021

Tenant
- Hải Phòng

The Lạch Tray Stadium (Vietnamese: Sân vận động Lạch Tray) is a multi-use stadium in Hai Phong, Vietnam. It is currently used mostly for association football matches and is the home stadium of the V.League 1 club Hải Phòng. The stadium holds 30,000 spectators after renovation in 2021.

== History ==
Lach Tray Stadium was built in 1957 from a horse farm (a yard with land of Lach Tray Equestrian Club). One year later, on the evening of January 1, 1958, the first international football match took place at Lach Tray Stadium between Hai Phong Football Club and a Chinese side that ended in a 2-0 win for the hosts.

In 1959, the stands were replaced by cement and covered roofs in the stands.

In 1963, there took place a one-table match in the Football League of the Socialist Republic of Poland, Czechoslovakia, North Korea and Vietnam 2 (in fact, the football team in Haiphong instead. the Mongolian team).

In 1972, when the United States sent bombers bombing the North in general and Hai Phong in particular, the rooms of two stands A and B were used by the Hai Phong hospital as a rescue.

In 1977, the yard was rebuilt with the reconstruction of the stands, with four 30-meter-high (98 ft) lights for football matches in the evening. Lach Tray Stadium was renamed to Central Stadium.

After this renovation, Lach Tray yard was repaired several times in 1995 (completed in 2001, repaired A and B stands, C and D stands, fixed yard and track; cost: 34,950 billion VND) and 2003 (for SEA Games 2003), electronic board, fund: 14,830 billion VND).

In addition to football and track and field, many other sports competitions as well as major cultural events are held on the stadium.

In addition to the Hai Phong football club, other teams of Hai Phong (dissolved, merged or renamed) also used to make their home such as Hai Phong Electricity, Cam River Chemicals, Hai Phong Port, Hai Phong Cement, Hai Phong Construction and Military Region 3.

== Stadium structure ==
=== Stand A ===
Stand A is the stadium's most modern spectator stand with an all-seating capacity of 7,600. It has two stories and is covered by a concrete roof. Stand A turns north-east, going in the direction of Lach Tray.

=== Stand B ===
Stand B turns in the direction of South-West. The stand is fully equipped with permanent seats and can accommodate 4,800 people. The stand has a small roof partially covering the middle part of the stand.

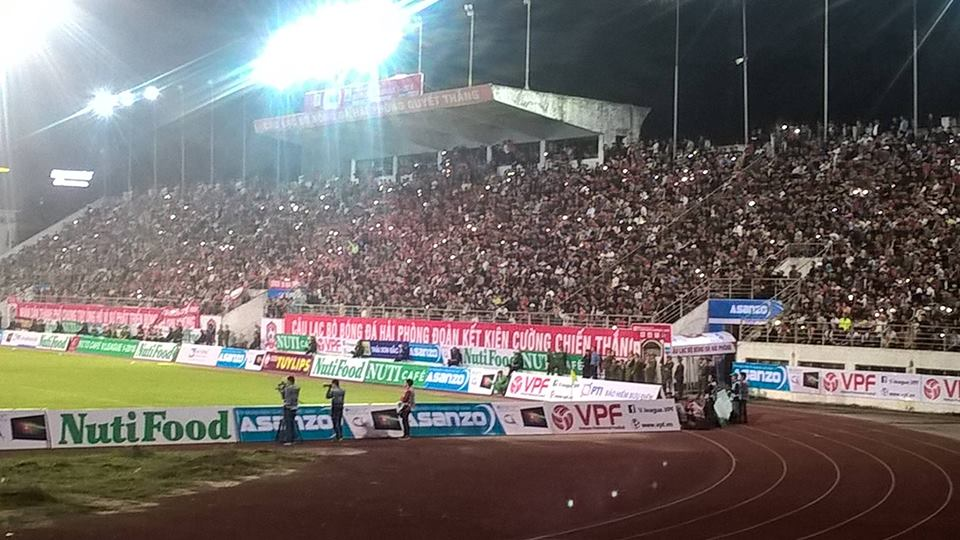
Stand B

=== Stand C & D ===
These are the two most distant podiums, with no seats, no roof, and a capacity of nearly 2500 each.

== International football matches ==
Date	Competition	Team 1	Res.	Team 2
15 December 2004	2004 AFF Championship	Cambodia	0–3	Singapore
6 September 2014	Friendly	Vietnam	3–1	Hong Kong
