= 2023–24 Adelaide United FC (women) season =

15th season in existence of Adelaide United FC (women)

Adelaide United (A-League Women)
2023–24 season
- Chairman: Ned Morris
- Manager: Adrian Stenta
- Stadium: Coopers Stadium; Marden Sports Complex
- A-League Women: 12th
- A-League Women Finals: DNQ
- Top goalscorer: Hannah Blake; Isabel Hodgson; Dylan Holmes (3 each)
- Highest home attendance: 3,844 vs. Western Sydney Wanderers (3 February 2024); A-League Women
- Lowest home attendance: 587 vs. Western United (9 December 2023); A-League Women
- Average home league attendance: 1,587
- Biggest win: 2–1 (3 times); 1–0 (once)
- Biggest defeat: 0–5 vs. Melbourne City (H) (6 January 2024); A-League Women
Home colours	Away colours
- All statistics correct as of 24 March 2024.

The 2023–24 season was the 15th in the history of Adelaide United Football Club (A-League Women) since its establishment in 2003. The club is participating in the A-League Women.

== Players ==
=== Squad information ===
Note: Flags indicate national team as defined under FIFA eligibility rules; some limited exceptions apply. Players may hold more than one non-FIFA nationality.

No.	Pos.	Nation	Player
1	GK	AUS	Annalee Grove
2	DF	AUS	Emily Hodgson
3	FW	AUS	Meleri Mullan (scholarship)
4	DF	AUS	Erin Kontoutsikos (scholarship)
5	MF	AUS	Sarah Morgan
6	FW	NZL	Hannah Blake
7	FW	USA	Mariah Lee
8	MF	AUS	Emily Condon
9	MF	NZL	Rosetta Taylor
10	FW	AUS	Chelsie Dawber
11	FW	AUS	Isabel Hodgson (captain)
12	MF	JPN	Nanako Sasaki
13	DF	AUS	Ella Tonkin
14	DF	USA	Jenna Holtz

No.	Pos.	Nation	Player
15	FW	AUS	Katie Bowler (scholarship)
16	MF	AUS	Dylan Holmes (vice-captain)
17	DF	AUS	Zoe Tolland (scholarship)
18	DF	AUS	Annabel Haffenden
19	DF	NED	Maruschka Waldus (vice-captain)
20	MF	AUS	Miley Grigg (youth)
21	GK	AUS	Claudia Jenkins (scholarship)
22	MF	AUS	Emilia Murray (scholarship)
23	FW	AUS	Alana Jancevski
26	GK	AUS	Grace Wilson (youth)
27	MF	AUS	Sian Dewey (youth)
28	FW	AUS	Chrissy Panagaris (scholarship)
32	MF	AUS	Madeleine Wright (scholarship)

== Transfers ==
=== Transfers in ===
No.	Position	Player	From	Type/fee	Contract length	Date	Ref
23	FW	Alana Jancevski	Perth Glory	Free transfer	1 year	17 August 2023	
6	FW	(New Zealand) Hannah Blake	Perth Glory	Free transfer	1 year	23 August 2023	
9	MF	(New Zealand) Rosetta Taylor	(England) Nottingham Forest	Free transfer	1 year	28 September 2023	
5	MF	Sarah Morgan	(Australia) NWS Spirit	Free transfer	1 year	4 October 2023	
14	DF	(United States) Jenna Holtz	(Spain) Cacereño	Free transfer	1 year	6 October 2023	
7	FW	(United States) Mariah Lee	(United States) OL Reign	Free transfer	1 year	6 October 2023	
18	DF	Annabel Haffenden	Brisbane Roar	Free transfer	1 year	6 October 2023	
21	GK	Claudia Jenkins	(Australia) Adelaide City	Free transfer	1 year (scholarship)	11 October 2023	
32	MF	Madeleine Wright	(Australia) FFSA NTC	Free transfer	1 year (scholarship)	12 October 2023	
10	FW	Chelsie Dawber	(United States) Chicago Red Stars	Free transfer	7 months	18 November 2023	
20	MF	Miley Grigg	Unattached	Youth development	6 months	7 December 2023	
27	MF	Sian Dewey	Unattached	Youth development	6 months	7 December 2023	
3	FW	Meleri Mullan	Unattached	Scholarship	5 months	18 January 2024	

=== Transfers out ===
No.	Position	Player	Transferred to	Type/fee	Date	Ref
7	MF	MelindaJ Barbieri	Unattached	End of contract	6 September 2023	
14	MF	Meisha Westland	Unattached	End of contract	6 September 2023	
18	MF	Sasha Coorey	Unattached	End of contract	6 September 2023	
20	GK	Jenna Farrow	Unattached	End of contract	6 September 2023	
23	FW	(England) Fiona Worts	Sydney FC	End of contract	6 September 2023	

=== Contract extensions ===
No.	Player	Position	Duration	Date	Ref.
16	Dylan Holmes	Midfielder	3 years	7 August 2023	
8	Emily Condon	Midfielder	1 year	30 August 2023	
15	Katie Bowler	Forward	1 year	31 August 2023	
22	Emilia Murray	Midfielder	1 year	31 August 2023	
2	Emily Hodgson	Defender	2 years	31 August 2023	
19	(Netherlands) Maruschka Waldus	Defender	2 years	5 September 2023	
4	Erin Kontoutsikos	Defender	1 year (scholarship)	11 October 2023	
17	Zoe Tolland	Defender	1 year (scholarship)	11 October 2023	
26	Grace Wilson	Goalkeeper	1 year (youth development)	11 October 2023	
28	Chrissy Panagaris	Forward	1 year (scholarship)	11 October 2023	

== Kits ==
Supplier: UCAN / Sponsor: Kite / Sleeve sponsor: McDonald's

Home	Away	Goalkeeper^{1}	Goalkeeper^{2}

== Pre-season and friendlies ==
23 September 2023	Adelaide United (Australia)	5–0	(Australia) WNPL Select	Adelaide
11:00 ACST		Report		Stadium: Steve Woodcock Sports Centre

== Competitions ==
=== Overall record ===
Competition	First match	Last match	Starting round	Final position	Record							
Competition	First match	Last match	Starting round	Final position	Pld	W	D	L	GF	GA	GD	Win %
A-League Women	15 October 2023	31 March 2024	Matchday 1	12th	22	4	3	15	21	56	−35	18.18
Total					22	4	3	15	21	56	−35	18.18

Source: Competitions

=== A-League Women ===
==== League table ====
Pos	Team	Pld	W	D	L	GF	GA	GD	Pts
8	Wellington Phoenix (Note: Wellington Phoenix cannot qualify for Asian Football Confederation competitions as they are based in New Zealand, which is under the Oceania Football Confederation.)	22	9	1	12	36	33	+3	28
9	Brisbane Roar	22	7	5	10	28	35	−7	26
10	Perth Glory	22	6	6	10	25	32	−7	24
11	Canberra United	22	6	6	10	39	47	−8	24
12	Adelaide United	22	4	3	15	21	56	−35	15

Source: A-Leagues
Rules for classification: 1) points; 2) wins; 3) goal difference; 4) goals scored; 5) head-to-head results; 6) Fair Play points; 7) away head-to-head results; 8) home head-to-head results; 9) toss of a coin

==== Results summary ====
Overall								Home						Away					
Pld	W	D	L	GF	GA	GD	Pts	W	D	L	GF	GA	GD	W	D	L	GF	GA	GD
21	4	3	14	20	53	−33	15	3	1	7	15	34	−19	1	2	7	5	19	−14

Last updated: 29 March 2024.
Source: Competitions

==== Results by round ====
Round	1	2	3	4	5	6	7	8	9	10	11	12	13	14	15	17	18	19	20	16	21	22
Ground	H	H	A	A	H	A	H	H	A	A	H	N	A	H	H	A	A	H	H	A	A	H
Result	D	L	L	L	L	D	L	W	W	L	L	L	L	W	W	D	L	L	L	L	L	L
Position	7	10	11	11	11	11	11	11	11	11	11	12	12	11	11	11	11	11	11	11	12	12
Points	1	1	1	1	1	2	2	5	8	8	8	8	8	11	14	15	15	15	15	15	15	15

Updated to match(es) played on 29 March 2024. Source: Competitions
A = Away; H = Home; N = Neutral; W = Win; D = Draw; L = Loss

==== Matches ====
Win Draw Loss

15 October 2023 1	Adelaide United	4–4	Canberra United	Adelaide
14:30 ACDT	Jancevski 9' (pen.); Lee 53' (pen.); Blake 65'; Murray 90+5'	Report	Milivojević 16', 68'; Heyman 43'; Flannery 62'	Stadium: Coopers Stadium; Attendance: 2,834; Referee: Georgia Ghirardello

20 October 2023 2	Adelaide United	1–2	Central Coast Mariners	Adelaide
16:30 ACDT	Tonkin 68'	Report	King 43'; Wurigumula 56'	Stadium: Coopers Stadium; Attendance: 3,185; Referee: Casey Reibelt

4 November 2023 3	Melbourne Victory	2–0	Adelaide United	Melbourne
17:00 AEDT	Weinert 31'; Morrison 37'	Report		Stadium: AAMI Park; Attendance: 4,102; Referee: Isabella Blaess

11 November 2023 4	Perth Glory	2–1	Adelaide United	Perth
19:00 AWST	Jale 50'; Phonsongkham 86'	Report	Holmes 43'	Stadium: Macedonia Park; Attendance: 1,231; Referee: Georgia Ghirardello

19 November 2023 5	Adelaide United	1–3	Sydney FC	Adelaide
13:30 ACDT	Blake 45+3'	Report	Worts 20', 26'; Ibini-Isei 79'	Stadium: Marden Sports Complex; Attendance: 1,376; Referee: Lara Lee

26 November 2023 6	Brisbane Roar	1–1	Adelaide United	Brisbane
17:15 AEST	Corbin 38'	Report	Lee 13'	Stadium: Suncorp Stadium; Attendance: 3,278; Referee: Isabella Libri
Note: The match was originally scheduled for 25 November 2023 at 15:00 AEST, but was moved back a day, and relocated from Ballymore Stadium to Suncorp Stadium.

9 December 2023 7	Adelaide United	1–3	Western United	Adelaide
15:30 ACDT	Dawber 71'	Report	A. Taranto 45', 66'; Keane 90+4'	Stadium: Marden Sports Complex; Attendance: 587; Referee: Isabella Blaess

16 December 2023 8	Adelaide United	2–1	Wellington Phoenix	Adelaide
17:00 ACDT	Condon 75'; Sasaki 85'	Report	Main 21'	Stadium: Marden Sports Complex; Attendance: 593; Referee: Rebecca Durcau

23 December 2023 9	Western Sydney Wanderers	0–1	Adelaide United	Sydney
18:00 AEDT		Report	Holmes 2'	Stadium: Wanderers Football Park; Attendance: 548; Referee: Bec Mackie

31 December 2023 10	Newcastle Jets	3–1	Adelaide United	Newcastle
17:00 AEDT	Copus-Brown 15'; Prior 20'; Bolden 49'	Report	Holmes 10'	Stadium: Newcastle Number 2 Sports Ground; Attendance: 1,763; Referee: Caitlin Williams

6 January 2024 11	Adelaide United	0–5	Melbourne City	Adelaide
17:00 ACDT		Report	Galic 15', 27', 34'; Torpey 30'; Wilkinson 83'	Stadium: Marden Sports Complex; Attendance: 883; Referee: Isabella Libri
Note: The match was originally scheduled for 5 January 2024 at 18:30 ACDT, but was moved back a day.

13 January 2024 12	Canberra United	3–1	Adelaide United	Sydney
17:00 AEDT	Heyman 50', 51'; Milivojević 64'	Report	I. Hodgson 46'	Stadium: Leichhardt Oval; Attendance: 1,183; Referee: Rebecca Durcau

21 January 2024 13	Western United	1–0	Adelaide United	Melbourne
18:00 AEDT	Hieda 52'	Report		Stadium: City Vista Recreation Reserve; Attendance: 705; Referee: Bec Mackie

27 January 2024 14	Adelaide United	2–1	Perth Glory	Adelaide
17:00 ACDT	Sasaski 45+2'; I. Hodgson 47'	Report	Lowry 23'	Stadium: Marden Sports Complex; Attendance: 903; Referee: Isabella Mossin

3 February 2024 15	Adelaide United	2–1	Western Sydney Wanderers	Adelaide
16:30 ACDT	Blake 71'; Panagaris 85'	Report	Harrison 44' (pen.)	Stadium: Coopers Stadium; Attendance: 3,844; Referee: Casey Reibelt

18 February 2024 17	Melbourne City	1–1	Adelaide United	Melbourne
17:00 AEDT	Galic 67'	Report	T. McKenna 70' (o.g.)	Stadium: City Football Academy; Attendance: 263; Referee: Rebecca Durcau

3 March 2024 18	Central Coast Mariners	2–0	Adelaide United	Gosford
15:15 AEDT	Karambasis 50'; Wurigumula 64'	Report		Stadium: Industree Group Stadium; Attendance: 1,573; Referee: Georgia Ghirardello

10 March 2024 19	Adelaide United	1–4	Melbourne Victory	Adelaide
16:30 ACDT	Hodgson 72'	Report	Gielnik 9', 32', 67'; Morrison 82'	Stadium: Coopers Stadium; Attendance: 923; Referee: Isabella Libri
Note: Match originally scheduled for 9 March 2024, but postponed due to extreme heat forecast. It was rescheduled to 10 March 2024.

16 March 2024 20	Adelaide United	1–2	Brisbane Roar	Adelaide
14:30 ACDT	Dawber 26'	Report	De la Harpe 9'; Yallop 74'	Stadium: Marden Sports Complex; Attendance: 742; Referee: Rebecca Durcau

20 March 2024 16	Wellington Phoenix	4–0	Adelaide United	Porirua
17:00 NZDT	Speckmaier 13'; Taylor 59'; Robertson 65'; Foster 90+1'	Report		Stadium: Jerry Collins Stadium; Attendance: 612; Referee: Mikayla Ryan

24 March 2024 21	Sydney FC	3–0	Adelaide United	Sydney
16:00 AEDT	Tallan-Henniker 8'; Hawkesby 24'; Vine 78'	Report		Stadium: Leichhardt Oval; Attendance: 3,137; Referee: Kelly Jones

29 March 2024 22	Adelaide United	0–8	Newcastle Jets	Adelaide
15:30 ACDT		Report	Davis 27'; Gooch 42', 47'; Allan 47'; Dundas 57'; Ayres 62', 70'; Huynh 90+1'	Stadium: Coopers Stadium; Referee: Bec Mackie

== Statistics ==
=== Appearances and goals ===
Includes all competitions. Players with no appearances not included in the list.

As of 29 March 2024

No.	Pos.	Nat.	Name	A-League Women		Total	
No.	Pos.	Nat.	Name	Apps	Goals	Apps	Goals
1	GK	(Australia)	Annalee Grove	18	0	18	0
2	DF	(Australia)	Emily Hodgson	22	0	22	0
3	MF	(Australia)	Meleri Mullan	4+5	0	9	0
5	DF	(Australia)	Sarah Morgan	12+7	0	19	0
6	FW	(New Zealand)	Hannah Blake	19+2	3	21	3
7	FW	(United States)	Mariah Lee	12+2	2	14	2
8	MF	(Australia)	Emily Condon	1+13	2	14	2
9	FW	(New Zealand)	Rosetta Taylor	3+4	0	7	0
10	FW	(Australia)	Chelsie Dawber	12	2	12	2
11	DF	(Australia)	Isabel Hodgson	18+2	3	20	3
12	MF	(Japan)	Nanako Sasaki	18+1	2	19	2
13	DF	(Australia)	Ella Tonkin	21	1	21	1
14	MF	(United States)	Jenna Holtz	7+14	0	21	0
15	MF	(Australia)	Katie Bowler	1+6	0	7	0
16	MF	(Australia)	Dylan Holmes	20	3	20	3
17	MF	(Australia)	Zoe Tolland	13+3	0	16	0
18	DF	(Australia)	Annabel Haffenden	1+3	0	4	0
19	DF	(Netherlands)	Maruschka Waldus	19+1	0	20	0
20	MF	(Australia)	Miley Grigg	0+4	0	4	0
21	GK	(Australia)	Claudia Jenkins	4	0	4	0
22	MF	(Australia)	Emilia Murray	0+3	1	3	1
23	FW	(Australia)	Alana Jancevski	15+6	1	21	1
26	GK	(Australia)	Grace Wilson	0+1	0	1	0
27	FW	(Australia)	Stan Dewey	0+2	0	2	0
28	FW	(Australia)	Chrissy Panagaris	0+9	1	9	1

=== Disciplinary record ===
Includes all competitions. The list is sorted by squad number when total cards are equal. Players with no cards not included in the list.

As of 29 March 2024

Rank	No.	Pos.	Nat.	Name	A-League Women			Total		
Rank	No.	Pos.	Nat.	Name	Yellow card	(yellow card) (yellow-red card)	Red card	Yellow card	(yellow card) (yellow-red card)	Red card
1	13	DF	(Australia)	Ella Tonkin	1	1	0	1	1	0
2	2	DF	(Australia)	Emily Hodgson	3	0	0	3	0	0
2	19	DF	(Netherlands)	Maruschka Waldus	3	0	0	3	0	0
2	23	FW	(Australia)	Alana Jancevski	3	0	0	3	0	0
5	5	DF	(Australia)	Sarah Morgan	2	0	0	2	0	0
5	6	FW	(New Zealand)	Hannah Blake	2	0	0	2	0	0
5	11	DF	(Australia)	Isabel Hodgson	2	0	0	2	0	0
5	12	MF	(Japan)	Nanako Sasaki	2	0	0	2	0	0
5	17	DF	(Australia)	Zoe Tolland	2	0	0	2	0	0
10	3	MF	(Australia)	Meleri Mullan	1	0	0	1	0	0
10	14	DF	(United States)	Jenna Holtz	1	0	0	1	0	0
10	16	MF	(Australia)	Dylan Holmes	1	0	0	1	0	0
Total					23	1	0	23	1	0

=== Clean sheets ===
Includes all competitions. The list is sorted by squad number when total clean sheets are equal. Numbers in parentheses represent games where both goalkeepers participated and both kept a clean sheet; the number in parentheses is awarded to the goalkeeper who was substituted on, whilst a full clean sheet is awarded to the goalkeeper who was on the field at the start of play. Goalkeepers with no clean sheets not included in the list.

As of 29 March 2024

Rank	No.	Nat.	Goalkeeper	A-League Women	Total
1	1	(Australia)	Annalee Grove	1	1
Total				1	1

== See also ==
- 2023–24 Adelaide United FC season
