= A-League Women transfers for 2021–22 season =

This is a list of Australian soccer transfers for the 2021–22 A-League Women. Only moves featuring at least one A-League Women club are listed.

== Transfers ==
All players without a flag are Australian. Clubs without a flag are clubs participating in the A-League Women.

=== Pre-season ===
Date	Name	Moving from	Moving to
5 March 2021	Sophie Magus	Western Sydney Wanderers	(Australia) APIA Leichhardt
29 March 2021	Claudia Cholakian	Sydney FC	(Australia) Sydney Olympic
31 March 2021	(United States) Mallory Weber	Adelaide United	(United States) Kansas City (Note: Weber was originally loaned to Adelaide United by Utah Royals, but they ceased operations and their assets were transferred to Kansas City on 7 December 2020.) (end of loan)
6 April 2021	Charlotte Grant	Adelaide United	(Sweden) Rosengård
8 April 2021	(Norway) Noor Eckhoff	Melbourne City	(Sweden) Eskilstuna United
12 April 2021	Julia Sardo	Melbourne City	(Australia) Calder United
17 April 2021	(Canada) Natalie Martineau	Melbourne Victory	(Australia) South Melbourne
22 April 2021	Rebekah Horsey	Brisbane Roar	(Australia) Sunshine Coast Wanderers
28 April 2021	Sharn Freier	Brisbane Roar	(Australia) Moreton Bay United
3 May 2021	Lia Muldeary	Melbourne City	(Australia) FV Emerging
4 May 2021	Teagan Micah	Melbourne City	(Norway) Sandviken
6 May 2021	Lara Kirkby	Adelaide United	(United States) Oregon Ducks
10 May 2021	(Netherlands) Maruschka Waldus	Adelaide United	(Netherlands) PSV
10 May 2021	Tameka Yallop	Brisbane Roar	(England) West Ham United
11 May 2021	Nickoletta Flannery	Canberra United	Unattached
20 May 2021	Morgan Aquino	Brisbane Roar	Perth Glory
24 May 2021	Alana Jancevski	Unattached	Perth Glory
28 May 2021	Demi Koulizakis	Canberra United	Perth Glory
8 June 2021	Alex Chidiac	Melbourne City	(Japan) JEF United Chiba
9 June 2021	Claudia Mihocic	(Australia) FV Emerging	Perth Glory
10 June 2021	Aideen Keane	Western Sydney Wanderers	Perth Glory
11 June 2021	Clare Wheeler	Sydney FC	(Denmark) Fortuna Hjørring
15 June 2021	Kim Carroll	Brisbane Roar	Perth Glory
16 June 2021	(Japan) Chinatsu Kira	Melbourne City	(Japan) Orca Kamogawa
18 June 2021	Angela Beard	Melbourne Victory	(Denmark) Fortuna Hjørring
22 June 2021	(United States) Kendall Fletcher	Canberra United	(United States) North Carolina Courage
22 June 2021	Susan Phonsongkham	Western Sydney Wanderers	Perth Glory
24 June 2021	(Republic of Ireland) Julie-Ann Russell	Western Sydney Wanderers	(Republic of Ireland) Galway
2 July 2021	Tessa Tamplin	Newcastle Jets	(Switzerland) Servette
16 July 2021	Evelyn Chronis	Newcastle Jets	(Australia) Northbridge Bulls
20 July 2021	Courtney Newbon	Western Sydney Wanderers	Perth Glory
21 July 2021	Sarah Cain	Melbourne City	Perth Glory
21 July 2021	Sofia Sakalis	Melbourne City	Perth Glory
22 July 2021	Inana Toovey	Adelaide United	(Australia) Adelaide Comets
29 July 2021	Winonah Heatley	Brisbane Roar	(Sweden) Växjö
30 July 2021	Isobel Dalton	Brisbane Roar	(England) Lewes
30 July 2021	(United States) Samantha Johnson	Melbourne City	(France) Soyaux
4 August 2021	Abbey Burns	Adelaide United	(Australia) FFSA NTC
6 August 2021	Teresa Polias	Sydney FC	Unattached
11 August 2021	Alana Murphy	Unattached	Melbourne Victory
13 August 2021	(New Zealand) Paige Satchell	Canberra United	Sydney FC
14 August 2021	(New Zealand) Olivia Chance	Brisbane Roar	(Scotland) Celtic
18 August 2021	Miranda Templeman	(Australia) FNSW Institute	Adelaide United
19 August 2021	(New Zealand) Rebekah Stott	(Australia) Bulleen Lions	Melbourne City
19 August 2021	Paige Hayward	(Austria) FFC Vorderland	Adelaide United
20 August 2021	Bianca Galic	Canberra United	Western Sydney Wanderers
20 August 2021	Sunny Franco	Brisbane Roar	Newcastle Jets
20 August 2021	Jenna McCormick	Melbourne City	(Denmark) AGF Fodbold
24 August 2021	Teigen Allen	Melbourne City	Western Sydney Wanderers
24 August 2021	(United States) Shea Connors	(Australia) Lions FC	Brisbane Roar
25 August 2021	(New Zealand) Hannah Wilkinson	(Germany) MSV Duisburg	Melbourne City
25 August 2021	Hollie Palmer	Melbourne City	Brisbane Roar
26 August 2021	Sheridan Gallagher	(United States) William Carey Crusaders	Western Sydney Wanderers
26 August 2021	Kirsty Fenton	Emerging Jets	Newcastle Jets
1 September 2021	Rhianna Pollicina	Newcastle Jets	Melbourne City
2 September 2021	Lucy Johnson	(Australia) South Melbourne	Newcastle Jets
3 September 2021	Ayesha Norrie	(Australia) Gold Coast United	Brisbane Roar
3 September 2021	Clare Hunt	Canberra United	Western Sydney Wanderers
3 September 2021	Sarah Hunter	Western Sydney Wanderers	Sydney FC
3 September 2021	Jessika Nash	Canberra United	Sydney FC
4 September 2021	(New Zealand) Annalie Longo	Melbourne Victory	Unattached
6 September 2021	(Chile) María José Rojas	Adelaide United	Sydney FC
7 September 2021	(Japan) Rie Kitano	(Australia) Souths United	Brisbane Roar
7 September 2021	Allira Toby	Sydney FC	Canberra United
8 September 2021	Sham Khamis	Unattached	Western Sydney Wanderers
9 September 2021	Kaitlyn Torpey	Brisbane Roar	Melbourne City
9 September 2021	Kahli Johnson	Unattached	Sydney FC
9 September 2021	Mary Stanic-Floody	Unattached	Sydney FC
9 September 2021	Eliza Campbell	Sydney FC	Unattached
12 September 2021	(United States) Chantel Jones	Canberra United	Retired
13 September 2021	Rebecca Bennett	Perth Glory	(Australia) Perth SC
15 September 2021	Isabella Foletta	Canberra United	(Italy) Lazio
15 September 2021	Sally James	Canberra United	Melbourne City
15 September 2021	Sadie Lawrence	(Australia) Murdoch University Melville	Perth Glory
17 September 2021	Caitlin Karic	(Australia) FV Emerging	Melbourne City
17 September 2021	Darcey Malone	(Australia) FNSW Institute	Melbourne City
17 September 2021	Holly McNamara	(Australia) FNSW Institute	Melbourne City
20 September 2021	(Denmark) Mie Leth Jans	(Sweden) Vittsjö	Perth Glory
20 September 2021	(United States) Cyera Hintzen	(Iceland) Valur	Perth Glory
24 September 2021	Mia Bailey	(Australia) Queensland Academy of Sport	Brisbane Roar
28 September 2021	(France) Margot Robinne	Melbourne City	Canberra United
28 September 2021	Holly Caspers	(Australia) Sydney University	Canberra United
29 September 2021	(New Zealand) Malia Steinmetz	Perth Glory	Western Sydney Wanderers
29 September 2021	Harriet Withers	Melbourne City	Melbourne Victory
29 September 2021	(United States) Cannon Clough	(Australia) Lions FC	Brisbane Roar
30 September 2021	Chloe Middleton	Western Sydney Wanderers	Canberra United
30 September 2021	Leticia McKenna	Brisbane Roar	Melbourne City
30 September 2021	Georgia Beaumont	(Australia) Moreton Bay United	Adelaide United
30 September 2021	Natasha Brough	(Netherlands) Alkmaar	Adelaide United
1 October 2021	(New Zealand) Marisa van der Meer	(New Zealand) Canterbury United Pride	Melbourne City
1 October 2021	Meisha Westland	(Australia) Lions FC	Melbourne City
1 October 2021	(Japan) Reona Omiya	(Australia) South Melbourne	Adelaide United
1 October 2021	Lanni McDougall	(Australia) Moreton Bay United	Brisbane Roar
2 October 2021	Courtney Nevin	Western Sydney Wanderers	Melbourne Victory
5 October 2021	Beth Mason-Jones	(Australia) Alamein United	Canberra United
5 October 2021	Casey Dumont	Unattached	Melbourne Victory
5 October 2021	Meaghan McElligott	(Australia) Western Pride	Brisbane Roar
7 October 2021	Alexia Karrys-Stahl	(Australia) Sydney Olympic	Canberra United
7 October 2021	Mikayla Vidmar	(Australia) Adelaide City	Canberra United
7 October 2021	Georgia Boric	(Australia) Sydney University	Newcastle Jets
7 October 2021	Ashlie Crofts	Canberra United	Western Sydney Wanderers
8 October 2021	Jessie Rasschaert	Canberra United	Brisbane Roar
8 October 2021	Shadeene Evans	(Australia) Northern Tigers	Adelaide United
13 October 2021	Annabel Haffenden	(Australia) Alamein United	Brisbane Roar
14 October 2021	Cassandra Zaffina	Brisbane Roar	(Australia) Gold Coast United
15 October 2021	(New Zealand) Lily Alfeld	Perth Glory	Wellington Phoenix
19 October 2021	(New Zealand) Grace Jale	(United States) Wake Forest Demon Deacons	Wellington Phoenix
19 October 2021	(New Zealand) Chloe Knott	(New Zealand) Northern Lights	Wellington Phoenix
19 October 2021	(New Zealand) Mackenzie Barry	(New Zealand) Northern Lights	Wellington Phoenix
19 October 2021	(New Zealand) Kelli Brown	(New Zealand) WaiBOP United	Wellington Phoenix
19 October 2021	(New Zealand) Ava Pritchard	(New Zealand) Northern Lights	Wellington Phoenix
19 October 2021	(New Zealand) Saskia Vosper	(New Zealand) Northern Lights	Wellington Phoenix
19 October 2021	(New Zealand) Grace Wisnewski	(New Zealand) WaiBOP United	Wellington Phoenix
19 October 2021	(New Zealand) Zoe McMeeken	(New Zealand) Canterbury United Pride	Wellington Phoenix
19 October 2021	(New Zealand) Kate Taylor	(New Zealand) Canterbury United Pride	Wellington Phoenix
26 October 2021	(New Zealand) Te Reremoana Walker	Emerging Jets	Wellington Phoenix
26 October 2021	Isabel Gomez	Western Sydney Wanderers	Wellington Phoenix
26 October 2021	Cushla Rue	(Australia) FNSW Institute	Wellington Phoenix
28 October 2021	(New Zealand) Charlotte Lancaster	(New Zealand) Palmerston North Marist	Wellington Phoenix
28 October 2021	(New Zealand) Alyssa Whinham	(New Zealand) Canterbury United Pride	Wellington Phoenix
1 November 2021	Natalie Tathem	Melbourne Victory	Brisbane Roar
1 November 2021	Gabe Marzano	Melbourne Victory	Retired
2 November 2021	(United States) Ally Haran	(United States) Orlando Pride	Canberra United
2 November 2021	(United States) Chelsee Washington	(United States) Orlando Pride	Canberra United (loan)
2 November 2021	(Norway) Marie Markussen	(Norway) Vålerenga	Newcastle Jets
3 November 2021	Brianna Edwards	(Australia) FNSW Institute	Wellington Phoenix
3 November 2021	Jordan Jasnos	(Australia) FNSW Institute	Wellington Phoenix
3 November 2021	Hannah Jones	(Australia) Sydney University	Wellington Phoenix
9 November 2021	Annabel Martin	Unattached	Wellington Phoenix
10 November 2021	Emma Robers	Unattached	Melbourne Victory
11 November 2021	Emma Stanbury	(Australia) West Canberra Wanderers	Adelaide United
11 November 2021	(Japan) Nanako Sasaki	(Australia) Adelaide Comets	Adelaide United
12 November 2021	(Argentina) Gaby Garton	Melbourne Victory	Unattached
12 November 2021	Bethany Gordon	(Denmark) AaB	Newcastle Jets
12 November 2021	Lara Gooch	Emerging Jets	Newcastle Jets
12 November 2021	Josie Morley	Emerging Jets	Newcastle Jets
15 November 2021	Grace Taranto	(Australia) Bulleen Lions	Adelaide United
15 November 2021	Leia Varley	(Australia) FV Emerging	Adelaide United
17 November 2021	Laura Johns	Adelaide United	(Australia) West Adelaide
23 November 2021	Ashleigh Sykes	(Australia) Canberra Olympic	Canberra United
24 November 2021	Ash Brodigan	(Australia) NWS Koalas	Newcastle Jets
25 November 2021	Lisa De Vanna	Melbourne Victory	Perth Glory (Note: Player retired, but then decided to return to the game.)
25 November 2021	Rachael Goldstein	Canberra United	(Australia) Macarthur Rams
29 November 2021	Winonah Heatley	(Sweden) Växjö	Melbourne City
30 November 2021	Coco Majstorovic	(Australia) Lions FC	Melbourne City
30 November 2021	Isabella Accardo	(Australia) FV Emerging	Melbourne City
1 December 2021	(United States) Elizabeth Eddy	(United States) NJ/NY Gotham	Newcastle Jets (loan)
1 December 2021	(United States) Kayla Sharples	(United States) Chicago Red Stars	Adelaide United (loan)
2 December 2021	Talitha Kramer	(Australia) Illawarra Stingrays	Wellington Phoenix
2 December 2021	(Canada) Isabella Habuda	(Australia) Gold Coast United	Western Sydney Wanderers
2 December 2021	Nia Stamatopoulos	(Australia) Alamein	Brisbane Roar
2 December 2021	Poppie Hooks	(Australia) Murdoch University Melville	Perth Glory
2 December 2021 (Note: Player was released to free agency before joining new club)	Elizabeth Ralston	Sydney FC	Western Sydney Wanderers
2 December 2021	Georgia Campagnale	Adelaide United	Unattached
2 December 2021	Sian Fryer-McLaren	Adelaide United	Unattached
2 December 2021	Kahlia Hogg	Adelaide United	Unattached
2 December 2021	Alisha Bass	Newcastle Jets	Unattached
2 December 2021	Chloe O'Brien	Newcastle Jets	Unattached
2 December 2021	Panagiota Petratos	Newcastle Jets	Unattached
2 December 2021	Nicole Simonsen	Newcastle Jets	Unattached
2 December 2021	Patricia Charalambous	Perth Glory	Unattached
2 December 2021	Caitlin Doeglas	Perth Glory	Unattached
2 December 2021	Jamie-Lee Gale	Perth Glory	Unattached
2 December 2021	Katarina Jukic	Perth Glory	Unattached
2 December 2021	Lexie Moreno	Perth Glory	Unattached
2 December 2021	Marianna Tabain	Perth Glory	Unattached
2 December 2021	Leena Khamis	Western Sydney Wanderers	Unattached
2 December 2021	Georgia Yeoman-Dale	Western Sydney Wanderers	Unattached
3 December 2021	Karly Roestbakken	(Norway) LSK Kvinner	Canberra United (loan)
3 December 2021	Chloe Lincoln	Canberra United Academy	Canberra United
3 December 2021	Emilia Murray	(Australia) FSA NTC	Adelaide United
3 December 2021	Grace Wilson	(Australia) FSA NTC	Adelaide United
3 December 2021	Alexia Apostolakis	Unattached	Western Sydney Wanderers
3 December 2021	Sarah Morgan	Perth Glory	Western Sydney Wanderers
3 December 2021	Isabella Whitton	(Australia) Manly United	Western Sydney Wanderers
3 December 2021	Ellen Gett	(Australia) Queensland Academy of Sport	Brisbane Roar
27 December 2021	Rosie Sutton	Brisbane Roar	(Australia) Olympic FC
	Shay Hollman	(Australia) Manly United	Sydney FC

=== Mid-season ===
Date	Name	Moving from	Moving to
4 December 2021	(United States) Lynn Williams	(United States) North Carolina Courage	Melbourne Victory (loan)
5 December 2021	Sophia Varley	Melbourne City	Melbourne Victory
7 December 2021	Emily van Egmond	(United States) Orlando Pride	Newcastle Jets (loan)
9 December 2021	Alex Chidiac	(Japan) JEF United Chiba	Melbourne Victory (loan)
10 December 2021	Isabella Foletta	(Italy) Lazio	Brisbane Roar
15 December 2021	Dylan Holmes	(Sweden) Häcken	Adelaide United
17 December 2021	Heidi Dennis	(Australia) Queensland Academy of Sport	Brisbane Roar
17 December 2021	Isabella Shuttleworth	(Australia) Lions FC	Brisbane Roar
17 December 2021	Francesca Iermano	Unattached	Melbourne Victory
5 January 2022	Emily van Egmond	Newcastle Jets	(United States) Orlando Pride (end of loan)
13 January 2022	(United States) Lynn Williams	Melbourne Victory	(United States) North Carolina Courage (end of loan)
14 January 2022	Leena Khamis	Unattached	Perth Glory
14 January 2022	Alexandra Huynh	(Denmark) Fortuna Hjørring	Western Sydney Wanderers
2 February 2022	Aleeah Davern	(Australia) Queensland Academy of Sport	Brisbane Roar
3 February 2022	(United States) Brooke Hendrix	(United States) Racing Louisville	Melbourne Victory
9 February 2022	Cristina Esposito	Unattached	Canberra United
11 February 2022	Ella Abdul Massih	Unattached	Western Sydney Wanderers
17 February 2022	Chantelle Symes	Unattached	Brisbane Roar
17 February 2022	Georgia Boric	Newcastle Jets	Unattached
17 February 2022	Sophie Magus	(Australia) Sydney University	Newcastle Jets

== Re-signings ==
Date	Name	Club
14 April 2021	Natasha Rigby	Perth Glory
14 April 2021	Hana Lowry	Perth Glory
14 April 2021	Tijan McKenna	Perth Glory
26 May 2021	Deborah-Anne De la Harpe	Perth Glory
3 June 2021	Sarah Carroll	Perth Glory
8 June 2021	Abbey Green	Perth Glory
8 June 2021	Isabella Wallhead	Perth Glory
28 June 2021	(England) Gemma Craine	Perth Glory
28 July 2021	Cassidy Davis	Newcastle Jets
28 July 2021	Gema Simon	Newcastle Jets
2 August 2021	Rosie Galea	Western Sydney Wanderers
3 August 2021	Bryleeh Henry	Western Sydney Wanderers
4 August 2021	Emily Hodgson (Note: Player signed a two-year extension.)	Adelaide United
4 August 2021	Matilda McNamara	Adelaide United
5 August 2021	Isabel Hodgson	Adelaide United
5 August 2021	Chelsie Dawber	Adelaide United
5 August 2021	(United States) Kayla Morrison	Melbourne Victory
5 August 2021	(New Zealand) Claudia Bunge	Melbourne Victory
5 August 2021	Polly Doran	Melbourne Victory
6 August 2021	Meleri Mullan	Adelaide United
6 August 2021	Ella Tonkin	Adelaide United
6 August 2021	(New Zealand) Elizabeth Anton	Perth Glory
7 August 2021	Olivia Price	Western Sydney Wanderers
9 August 2021	Libby Copus-Brown	Western Sydney Wanderers
9 August 2021	Hannah Brewer	Newcastle Jets
9 August 2021	Tara Andrews	Newcastle Jets
9 August 2021	Natalie Tobin	Sydney FC
10 August 2021	Sarah Willacy	Western Sydney Wanderers
12 August 2021	MelindaJ Barbieri	Melbourne Victory
12 August 2021	Amy Jackson	Melbourne Victory
13 August 2021	Danika Matos	Western Sydney Wanderers
16 August 2021	Claire Coelho	Newcastle Jets
16 August 2021	Sophie Harding	Newcastle Jets
16 August 2021	Ally Green	Sydney FC
16 August 2021	Princess Ibini	Sydney FC
16 August 2021	Remy Siemsen	Sydney FC
17 August 2021	Emily Condon	Adelaide United
18 August 2021	Annalee Grove	Adelaide United
19 August 2021	Jamilla Rankin	Brisbane Roar
19 August 2021	Lia Privitelli	Melbourne Victory
19 August 2021	(United States) Catherine Zimmerman	Melbourne Victory
19 August 2021	Jada Whyman	Sydney FC
19 August 2021	Cortnee Vine	Sydney FC
19 August 2021	Charlotte McLean	Sydney FC
20 August 2021	(Brazil) Mariel Hecher	Brisbane Roar
21 August 2021	Holly McQueen	Brisbane Roar
24 August 2021	Emma Checker (Note: Checker signed a two-year extension after spending the off-season at Selfoss.)	Melbourne City
25 August 2021	Michelle Heyman	Canberra United
26 August 2021	Georgina Worth	Brisbane Roar
26 August 2021	Taylor Ray	Sydney FC
26 August 2021	Natasha Prior	Sydney FC
26 August 2021	Angelique Hristodoulou	Sydney FC
26 August 2021	Rachel Lowe	Sydney FC
26 August 2021	Mackenzie Hawkesby	Sydney FC
26 August 2021	Charlize Rule	Sydney FC
26 August 2021	Lauren Allan	Newcastle Jets
27 August 2021	Larissa Crummer	Brisbane Roar
27 August 2021	Chelsea Blissett (Note: Player signed a three-year extension.)	Melbourne City
28 August 2021	Anna Margraf	Brisbane Roar
31 August 2021	Emma Ilijoski	Canberra United
31 August 2021	Teigan Collister	Western Sydney Wanderers
2 September 2021	Laura Hughes	Canberra United
2 September 2021	Tiana Jaber	Newcastle Jets
2 September 2021	Jemma House	Newcastle Jets
3 September 2021	Leah Davidson	Melbourne City
7 September 2021	Tori Tumeth	Melbourne City
9 September 2021	Ellie Brush	Sydney FC
9 September 2021	Katie Offer	Sydney FC
10 September 2021	Naomi Chinnama	Melbourne City
10 September 2021	Erica Halloway	Western Sydney Wanderers
10 September 2021	Caitlin Cooper	Western Sydney Wanderers
14 September 2021	Grace Maher	Canberra United
16 September 2021	Keeley Richards	Canberra United
16 September 2021	Tiffany Eliadis	Melbourne Victory
22 September 2021	Hayley Taylor-Young	Canberra United
23 September 2021	Lauren Keir	Canberra United
23 September 2021	Melissa Barbieri	Melbourne City
28 September 2021	(Serbia) Tyla-Jay Vlajnic	Melbourne City
29 September 2021	Paige Zois	Melbourne Victory
5 October 2021	Taren King	Newcastle Jets
5 October 2021	Melissa Maizels	Melbourne Victory
20 October 2021	Katrina Gorry	Brisbane Roar
25 October 2021	(England) Fiona Worts	Adelaide United
10 November 2021	Maja Markovski	Melbourne Victory
2 December 2021	Margaux Chauvet	Western Sydney Wanderers
3 December 2021	Sasha Grove	Canberra United
3 December 2021	Nikola Orgill (Note: Orgill spent the off-season at Klepp.)	Western Sydney Wanderers
