= A-League Women transfers for 2023–24 season =

This is a list of Australian soccer transfers for the 2023–24 A-League Women. Only moves featuring at least one A-League Women club are listed.

== Transfers ==
All players without a flag are Australian. Clubs without a flag are clubs participating in the A-League Women.

=== Pre-season ===
| Date | Name | Moving from | Moving to |
|---|---|---|---|
| 17 October 2022 | Annalise Rasmussen | Unattached | Central Coast Mariners |
| 23 February 2023 | Aimee Medwin | Western United | Unattached |
| 2 March 2023 | Chloe Middleton | Canberra United | (Australia) Illawarra Stingrays |
| 15 March 2023 | Ellie Brush | Canberra United | Retired |
| 22 March 2023 | Kim Carroll | Perth Glory | Retired |
| 23 March 2023 | Claire Coelho | Newcastle Jets | Retired |
| 24 March 2023 | Tara Andrews | Newcastle Jets | Retired |
| 31 March 2023 | Teigen Allen | Newcastle Jets | Retired |
| 3 April 2023 | Josie Morley | Newcastle Jets | (Australia) Adamstown Rosebud |
| 3 April 2023 | Leia Puxty | Newcastle Jets | (Australia) Adamstown Rosebud |
| 3 April 2023 | Sophie Stapleford | Newcastle Jets | (Australia) Maitland FC |
| 3 April 2023 | Tessa Tamplin | Newcastle Jets | Unattached |
| 4 April 2023 | Sheridan Gallagher | Western Sydney Wanderers | Unattached |
| 5 April 2023 | Jessie Rasschaert | Brisbane Roar | Retired |
| 21 April 2023 | Aleeah Davern | Brisbane Roar | (Australia) Souths United |
| 24 April 2023 | (Canada) Kennedy Faulknor | Canberra United | (United States) Minnesota Aurora |
| 26 April 2023 | (United States) Hensley Hancuff | Brisbane Roar | (United States) Gotham FC (end of loan) |
| 28 April 2023 | Casey Dumont | Melbourne Victory | (Australia) Hawthorn (AFLW) |
| 1 May 2023 | Zara Kruger | Brisbane Roar | (Australia) Lions FC (end of loan) |
| 5 May 2023 | Renée Pountney | Newcastle Jets | (Australia) Gladesville Ravens |
| 13 May 2023 | Emily Roach | Newcastle Jets | (Australia) Blacktown Spartans |
| 16 May 2023 | Emily Kos | Melbourne Victory | Unattached |
| 16 May 2023 | Maja Markovski | Melbourne Victory | Unattached |
| 16 May 2023 | (Canada) Danielle Steer | Western United | (Canada) Nautsa’mawt |
| 19 May 2023 | Grace Taranto | Canberra United | (Australia) Bulleen Lions |
| 20 May 2023 | Teresa Morrissey | Western Sydney Wanderers | (Australia) Macarthur Rams |
| 23 May 2023 | Talitha Kramer | Brisbane Roar | (Australia) Brisbane City |
| 24 May 2023 | (New Zealand) Betsy Hassett | Wellington Phoenix | (Iceland) Stjarnan |
| 26 May 2023 | (United States) Madison Haley | Sydney FC | Unattached |
| 26 May 2023 | Katie Offer | Sydney FC | Unattached |
| 26 May 2023 | (New Zealand) Anna Green | Sydney FC | Retired |
| 1 June 2023 | Mia Bailey | Brisbane Roar | (Australia) Gold Coast United |
| 20 June 2023 | Isobel Dalton | Unattached | Perth Glory (Note: Player signed a two-year contract.) |
| 21 June 2023 | Grace Johnston | Unattached | Perth Glory |
| 21 June 2023 | Georgia Cassidy | Unattached | Perth Glory |
| 23 June 2023 | (New Zealand) Ava Pritchard | Wellington Phoenix | Unattached |
| 23 June 2023 | (New Zealand) Charlotte Lancaster | Wellington Phoenix | Unattached |
| 23 June 2023 | (New Zealand) Te Reremoana Walker | Wellington Phoenix | Unattached |
| 23 June 2023 | (New Zealand) Saskia Vosper | Wellington Phoenix | Unattached |
| 23 June 2023 | (New Zealand) Georgia Candy | Wellington Phoenix | Unattached |
| 27 June 2023 | (Guyana) Sydney Cummings | Western United | (United States) San Diego Wave |
| 27 June 2023 | (United States) Shea Connors | Western United | (United States) San Diego Wave |
| 29 June 2023 | (United States) Hillary Beall | Western United | (United States) Racing Louisville (end of loan) |
| 30 June 2023 | Chloe Walandouw | Newcastle Jets | Unattached |
| 1 July 2023 | (United States) Cyera Hintzen | Perth Glory | (United States) Gotham FC |
| 6 July 2023 | (Republic of Ireland) Deborah-Anne De la Harpe | Sydney FC | (Denmark) HB Køge |
| 6 July 2023 | Talia Younis | Unattached | Western Sydney Wanderers |
| 11 July 2023 | (New Zealand) Milly Clegg | Wellington Phoenix | Western Sydney Wanderers |
| 11 July 2023 | Georgina Worth | Newcastle Jets | Retired |
| 17 July 2023 | Sarah Hunter | Sydney FC | (France) Paris FC |
| 20 July 2023 | Tanika Lala | Unattached | Perth Glory |
| 21 July 2023 | Mackenzie Hawkesby | Sydney FC | (England) Brighton & Hove Albion |
| 24 July 2023 | Madison McComasky | Canberra United | Western Sydney Wanderers |
| 24 July 2023 | (United States) Emily Garnier | Newcastle Jets | Retired |
| 26 July 2023 | (United States) Murphy Agnew | Newcastle Jets | (Scotland) Celtic |
| 26 July 2023 | (United States) Catherine Zimmerman | Melbourne Victory | Western United |
| 26 July 2023 | Charlize Rule | Sydney FC | (England) Brighton & Hove Albion |
| 28 July 2023 | (New Zealand) Rebecca Lake | (New Zealand) Canterbury United Pride | Wellington Phoenix |
| 28 July 2023 | Claudia Cicco | Wellington Phoenix | Newcastle Jets |
| 1 August 2023 | (Croatia) Bianca Galic | (Australia) Sydney University | Central Coast Mariners |
| 3 August 2023 (Note: Player was released to free agency before joining new club) | (United States) Rola Badawiya | Sydney FC | Central Coast Mariners |
| 4 August 2023 | Grace Maher | Canberra United | Western United |
| 4 August 2023 | Isabel Gomez | Wellington Phoenix | Central Coast Mariners |
| 4 August 2023 | Sarah Langman | Perth Glory | Central Coast Mariners |
| 4 August 2023 | Sophie Hoban | (Australia) APIA Leichhardt | Newcastle Jets |
| 5 August 2023 | Annabel Martin | (Australia) Sydney University | Central Coast Mariners |
| 7 August 2023 | Sally James | Melbourne City | Perth Glory |
| 10 August 2023 | (New Zealand) Rebecca Burrows | Unattached | Newcastle Jets |
| 10 August 2023 | (United States) Hope Breslin | (United States) Houston Dash | Wellington Phoenix |
| 10 August 2023 | (New Zealand) Paige Satchell | Wellington Phoenix | Unattached |
| 10 August 2023 | (New Zealand) Emma Rolston | Wellington Phoenix | Unattached |
| 10 August 2023 | Margaux Chauvet | Unattached | Sydney FC |
| 10 August 2023 | Lucy Johnson | Newcastle Jets | Sydney FC |
| 10 August 2023 | Aideen Keane | Perth Glory | Sydney FC |
| 11 August 2023 | (New Zealand) Rebekah Stott | (England) Brighton & Hove Albion | Melbourne City |
| 11 August 2023 | Tegan Bertolissio | (Australia) Macarthur Rams | Canberra United |
| 15 August 2023 | (United States) Hailey Davidson | (Sweden) Mallbacken | Wellington Phoenix |
| 15 August 2023 | (New Zealand) Grace Jale | Canberra United | Perth Glory |
| 15 August 2023 | Alexandra Huynh | (Australia) Macarthur Rams | Newcastle Jets |
| 16 August 2023 | (New Zealand) Macey Fraser | Unattached | Wellington Phoenix (Note: Player signed a three-year contract.) |
| 16 August 2023 | Keeley Richards | Canberra United | Brisbane Roar |
| 17 August 2023 | Ruby Cuthbert | (Australia) Football West NTC | Brisbane Roar |
| 17 August 2023 | Alana Jancevski | Perth Glory | Adelaide United |
| 17 August 2023 | Taren King | Newcastle Jets | Central Coast Mariners |
| 17 August 2023 | (England) Millie Farrow | (United States) North Carolina Courage | Perth Glory |
| 18 August 2023 | (Venezuela) Mariana Speckmaier | (United States) Washington Spirit | Wellington Phoenix |
| 18 August 2023 | Francesca Iermano | Western United | Unattached |
| 18 August 2023 | Aleksandra Sinclair | Western United | Unattached |
| 18 August 2023 | Tiana Jaber | Western United | Unattached |
| 18 August 2023 | Harriet Withers | Western United | Unattached |
| 21 August 2023 | Rachel Lowe | Sydney FC | Melbourne Victory |
| 22 August 2023 | Jenna McCormick | Adelaide United | Brisbane Roar |
| 22 August 2023 | Emma Checker | Melbourne City | Melbourne Victory |
| 23 August 2023 | (China) Wu Chengshu | Canberra United | (France) Dijon |
| 23 August 2023 | (New Zealand) Hannah Blake | Perth Glory | Adelaide United |
| 23 August 2023 | (Denmark) Hannah Holgersen | Adelaide United | Brisbane Roar |
| 23 August 2023 | Paige Hayward | Adelaide United | Central Coast Mariners |
| 23 August 2023 | Jamilla Rankin | Brisbane Roar | Melbourne Victory |
| 24 August 2023 | Tameka Yallop | (Norway) Brann | Brisbane Roar (Note: Player signed a multi-year contract.) |
| 24 August 2023 | (Japan) Keiwa Hieda | (Australia) Calder United | Western United |
| 24 August 2023 | Melina Ayres | Melbourne Victory | Newcastle Jets |
| 24 August 2023 | (Japan) Kurea Okino | (Australia) Boroondara Eagles | Melbourne Victory |
| 24 August 2023 | (New Zealand) Indiah-Paige Riley | Brisbane Roar | (Netherlands) PSV |
| 25 August 2023 | Chelsea Blissett | Melbourne City | Brisbane Roar |
| 25 August 2023 | Laura Hughes | Canberra United | Melbourne City |
| 25 August 2023 | Ashlee Brodigan | Newcastle Jets | Brisbane Roar |
| 25 August 2023 | Ella O'Grady | (Australia) QAS | Melbourne Victory |
| 25 August 2023 | Sienna Saveska | Western Sydney Wanderers | Sydney FC |
| 25 August 2023 | Tori Tumeth | Melbourne City | Sydney FC |
| 26 August 2023 | (Canada) Lysianne Proulx | (Portugal) Torreense | Melbourne City |
| 26 August 2023 | (New Zealand) Ruby Nathan | (New Zealand) Auckland United | Canberra United |
| 26 August 2023 | (United States) Jazmin Wardlow | (Italy) Fiorentina | Central Coast Mariners |
| 28 August 2023 | (New Zealand) Claudia Bunge | Melbourne Victory | (Denmark) HB Køge |
| 28 August 2023 | (United States) Leah Scarpelli | (Portugal) Sporting CP | Brisbane Roar |
| 28 August 2023 | (New Zealand) Daisy Brazendale | Phoenix Academy | Wellington Phoenix |
| 28 August 2023 | (New Zealand) Manaia Elliott | Phoenix Academy | Wellington Phoenix |
| 28 August 2023 | (New Zealand) Olivia Ingham | Phoenix Academy | Wellington Phoenix |
| 29 August 2023 | Tijan McKenna | Perth Glory | Melbourne City |
| 29 August 2023 | (Philippines) Angela Beard | Western United | (Sweden) Linköping |
| 29 August 2023 | (New Zealand) Malia Steinmetz | Western Sydney Wanderers | (Denmark) Nordsjælland |
| 30 August 2023 | Kiara Rochaix | (Australia) Blacktown City | Newcastle Jets |
| 30 August 2023 | Tia Stonehill | (Australia) Balcatta Etna | Perth Glory |
| 30 August 2023 | (United States) Mia Corbin | (Italy) Parma | Brisbane Roar |
| 31 August 2023 | Ella Mastrantonio | Perth Glory | (Austria) SKN St. Pölten |
| 31 August 2023 | (United States) Shea Connors | (United States) San Diego Wave | Sydney FC |
| 31 August 2023 | Zara Kruger | (Australia) Lions FC | Sydney FC |
| 31 August 2023 | India Breier | (Australia) Macarthur Rams | Western Sydney Wanderers |
| 31 August 2023 | (Switzerland) Lorena Baumann | Unattached | Newcastle Jets |
| 1 September 2023 | Gema Simon | Melbourne Victory | Newcastle Jets |
| 4 September 2023 | (Chile) María José Rojas | Melbourne City | Canberra United |
| 4 September 2023 | (United States) Vicky Bruce | (England) Bristol City | Western Sydney Wanderers |
| 4 September 2023 | Natalie Picak | (Australia) Calder United | Western United |
| 4 September 2023 | (United States) Maggie Shaw | Unattached | Newcastle Jets |
| 5 September 2023 | (New Zealand) Lily Alfeld | Wellington Phoenix | Unattached |
| 5 September 2023 | (Philippines) Jessika Cowart | (Sweden) Kalmar | Perth Glory |
| 5 September 2023 | (United States) Izzy Nino | (United States) Michigan Wolverines | Newcastle Jets |
| 6 September 2023 | (New Zealand) Kelli Brown | (Australia) Macarthur Rams | Wellington Phoenix |
| 6 September 2023 | Grace Kuilamu | (Australia) QAS | Brisbane Roar |
| 6 September 2023 | Sasha Coorey | Adelaide United | Unattached |
| 6 September 2023 | Jenna Farrow | Adelaide United | Unattached |
| 6 September 2023 | Meisha Westland | Adelaide United | Unattached |
| 6 September 2023 | (England) Fiona Worts | Adelaide United | Sydney FC |
| 6 September 2023 | Lucy Richards | (Australia) Calder United | Western United |
| 7 September 2023 | Libby Copus-Brown | (England) Lewes | Newcastle Jets |
| 8 September 2023 | Mary Stanic-Floody | Sydney FC | Canberra United |
| 8 September 2023 | (Philippines) Quinley Quezada | (Serbia) Red Star Belgrade | Perth Glory |
| 8 September 2023 | Natalie Tathem | Melbourne Victory | Unattached |
| 8 September 2023 | Anna Liacopoulos | Melbourne Victory | Unattached |
| 8 September 2023 | (New Zealand) Katie Bowen | Melbourne City | (Italy) Inter Milan |
| 9 September 2023 | Shadeene Evans | Sydney FC | Central Coast Mariners |
| 10 September 2023 | Ash Irwin | (Australia) Sydney Olympic | Central Coast Mariners |
| 10 September 2023 | Sophie Nenadovic | Unattached | Central Coast Mariners |
| 13 September 2023 | (United States) Tori Hansen | (United States) Orlando Pride | Melbourne Victory (loan) |
| 13 September 2023 | (United States) Kaylie Collins | (United States) Orlando Pride | Western Sydney Wanderers (loan) |
| 13 September 2023 | (United States) Jordan Silkowitz | (United States) Kansas City Current | Brisbane Roar (loan) |
| 13 September 2023 | (New Zealand) Annalie Longo | Unattached | Wellington Phoenix |
| 15 September 2023 | (New Zealand) Deven Jackson | (New Zealand) Eastern Suburbs | Canberra United |
| 15 September 2023 | (United States) McKenzie Weinert | (United States) OL Reign | Melbourne Victory |
| 15 September 2023 | Clare Hunt | Western Sydney Wanderers | (France) Paris Saint-Germain |
| 15 September 2023 | Georgia Beaumont | Brisbane Roar | Unattached |
| 15 September 2023 | (France) Margot Robinne | Brisbane Roar | Unattached |
| 16 September 2023 | Lydia Williams | (England) Brighton & Hove Albion | Melbourne Victory |
| 16 September 2023 | Josie Wilson | (Australia) Northern Tigers | Newcastle Jets |
| 18 September 2023 | (United States) Cannon Clough | Newcastle Jets | Canberra United |
| 19 September 2023 | (Canada) Rylee Foster | Unattached | Wellington Phoenix |
| 19 September 2023 | (United States) Taylor Otto | (United States) Gotham FC | Melbourne City |
| 19 September 2023 | Lilly Bailey | (Australia) Football West NTC | Perth Glory |
| 20 September 2023 | Emma Dundas | Emerging Jets | Newcastle Jets |
| 20 September 2023 | Milan Hammond | Perth Glory | Newcastle Jets |
| 20 September 2023 | Zoe Karapidis | Emerging Jets | Newcastle Jets |
| 21 September 2023 | Anika Stajcic | Sydney FC | Perth Glory |
| 21 September 2023 | Teagan Thompson | (Australia) Lions FC | Brisbane Roar |
| 22 September 2023 | Emily Gielnik | Unattached | Melbourne Victory |
| 22 September 2023 | Kyah Simon | Unattached | Central Coast Mariners |
| 22 September 2023 | Tiarna Karambasis | (Australia) Lions FC | Central Coast Mariners |
| 23 September 2023 | (England) Faye Bryson | Unattached | Central Coast Mariners |
| 23 September 2023 | Chloe Carmichael | (Australia) Nepean FC | Central Coast Mariners |
| 25 September 2023 | Ischia Brooking | (Australia) Football West NTC | Western Sydney Wanderers |
| 28 September 2023 | Jasmine Black | Unattached | Sydney FC |
| 28 September 2023 | (New Zealand) Rosetta Taylor | (England) Nottingham Forest | Adelaide United |
| 28 September 2023 | Ellen Gett | Canberra United | Unattached |
| 28 September 2023 | (United States) Rylee Baisden | Perth Glory | Unattached |
| 28 September 2023 | (United States) Gabriella Coleman | Perth Glory | Unattached |
| 28 September 2023 | Demi Koulizakis | Perth Glory | Unattached |
| 29 September 2023 | (China) Wurigumula | (China) Changchun Jiuyin Loans | Central Coast Mariners (loan) |
| 30 September 2023 | Natasha Prior | (Australia) APIA Leichhardt | Newcastle Jets |
| 1 October 2023 | (New Zealand) Aimee Danieli | Phoenix Academy | Wellington Phoenix |
| 1 October 2023 | Amy Jackson | Melbourne Victory | Unattached |
| 3 October 2023 | (United States) Maliah Morris | (United States) Orlando Pride | Western Sydney Wanderers |
| 4 October 2023 | Sarah Morgan | (Australia) NWS Spirit | Adelaide United |
| 5 October 2023 | Alex McKenzie | (Australia) Illawarra Stingrays | Canberra United |
| 6 October 2023 | (United States) Jenna Holtz | (Spain) Cacereño | Adelaide United |
| 6 October 2023 | (United States) Mariah Lee | (United States) OL Reign | Adelaide United |
| 6 October 2023 | Annabel Haffenden | Brisbane Roar | Adelaide United |
| 6 October 2023 | Ava Piazza | (Australia) Heidelberg United | Canberra United |
| 7 October 2023 | Alexia Karrys-Stahl | (Australia) Bankstown City | Central Coast Mariners |
| 9 October 2023 | Tiffany Eliadis | Melbourne Victory | (Portugal) Atlético Ouriense |
| 9 October 2023 | (United States) Maggie Shaw | Newcastle Jets | Unattached |
| 9 October 2023 | Bonnie Davies | (Australia) Peninsula Power | Newcastle Jets |
| 9 October 2023 | MelindaJ Barbieri | Adelaide United | Newcastle Jets |
| 10 October 2023 | Coco Majstorovic | Unattached | Canberra United |
| 10 October 2023 | Georgia Ritchie | Unattached | Canberra United |
| 11 October 2023 | Maia Cameron | Canberra United Academy | Canberra United |
| 11 October 2023 | Mischa Anderson | (Australia) Football West NTC | Perth Glory |
| 11 October 2023 | Clara Hoarau | (Australia) Murdoch University Melville | Perth Glory |
| 11 October 2023 | Claudia Jenkins | (Australia) Adelaide City | Adelaide United |
| 11 October 2023 | Kiara De Domizio | (Australia) Sydney Olympic | Western United |
| 11 October 2023 | Keely Segavcic | Canberra United | Western Sydney Wanderers |
| 11 October 2023 | (Czech Republic) Jitka Chlastáková | Western Sydney Wanderers | Unattached |
| 11 October 2023 | (Philippines) Sarina Bolden | Western Sydney Wanderers | Unattached |
| 12 October 2023 | Kiera Meyers | Unattached | Melbourne City |
| 12 October 2023 | Leia Varley | Unattached | Melbourne City |
| 12 October 2023 | Madeleine Wright | (Australia) FFSA NTC | Adelaide United |
| 13 October 2023 | Laura Pickett | Unattached | Melbourne Victory |
| 13 October 2023 | Darcey Malone | Melbourne City | Sydney FC |
| 13 October 2023 | Bec Kirkup | (Australia) Lions FC | Brisbane Roar |
| 13 October 2023 | Sarah O'Donoghue | (Australia) Souths United | Brisbane Roar |
| 13 October 2023 | Emma Gibbon | (Australia) Eastern Suburbs | Brisbane Roar |
| 14 October 2023 | Courtney Newbon | (Australia) Sydney Olympic | Central Coast Mariners |
| 16 October 2023 | (United States) Sara D'Appolonia | (Australia) Peninsula Power | Melbourne Victory |
| 16 October 2023 | Madelyn Whittall | (Australia) Canberra Olympic | Canberra United |
| 16 October 2023 | Hannah McNulty | (Australia) Northern Tigers | Canberra United |
| 19 October 2023 | Michaela Thornton | (Australia) Canberra Olympic | Canberra United |

=== Mid-season ===
| Date | Name | Moving from | Moving to |
|---|---|---|---|
| 31 October 2023 | Avaani Prakash | (Australia) Macarthur FC | Western United |
| 1 November 2023 | (United States) Hillary Beall | (United States) Racing Louisville | Western United (loan) |
| 2 November 2023 | Michaela Thornton | Canberra United | Unattached |
| 2 November 2023 | Jessica Seaman | Unattached | Sydney FC |
| 2 November 2023 | Caley Tallon-Henniker | Unattached | Sydney FC |
| 8 November 2023 | (Democratic Republic of the Congo) Exaucée Kizinga | Unattached | Newcastle Jets |
| 10 November 2023 | (Bosnia and Herzegovina) Emina Ekic | (United States) Racing Louisville | Melbourne City |
| 11 November 2023 | Casey Dumont | (Australia) Hawthorn (AFLW) | Central Coast Mariners |
| 17 November 2023 | Emily van Egmond | (United States) San Diego Wave | Newcastle Jets |
| 18 November 2023 | (Mexico) Briana Woodall | (Mexico) Club León | Central Coast Mariners |
| 18 November 2023 | Chelsie Dawber | (United States) Chicago Red Stars | Adelaide United |
| 26 November 2023 | (Philippines) Sarina Bolden | Unattached | Newcastle Jets |
| 26 November 2023 | (Democratic Republic of the Congo) Exaucée Kizinga | Newcastle Jets | Unattached |
| 26 November 2023 | (United States) Jordan Thompson | Unattached | Sydney FC |
| 30 November 2023 | (New Zealand) Chloe Knott | Wellington Phoenix | Unattached |
| 2 December 2023 | Courtney Newbon | Central Coast Mariners | Unattached |
| 7 December 2023 | (United States) Isabel Cox | (United States) North Carolina Tar Heels | Wellington Phoenix |
| 7 December 2023 | Sian Dewey | Unattached | Adelaide United |
| 7 December 2023 | Miley Grigg | Unattached | Adelaide United |
| 10 December 2023 | Jessica Seaman | Sydney FC | Unattached |
| 10 December 2023 | Madeleine Caspers | (Australia) Football NSW Institute | Sydney FC |
| 14 December 2023 | (United States) Sarah Clark | (United States) North Carolina Courage | Canberra United |
| 16 December 2023 | Bonnie Davies | Newcastle Jets | Brisbane Roar |
| 17 December 2023 | Emily van Egmond | Newcastle Jets | Unattached |
| 19 December 2023 | Lillian Skelly | (Australia) Football NSW Institute | Canberra United |
| 22 December 2023 | (Republic of Ireland) Deborah-Anne De la Harpe | Unattached | Brisbane Roar |
| 27 December 2023 | (New Zealand) Helena Errington | (Portugal) Sporting CP | Wellington Phoenix |
| 27 December 2023 | Tiana Jaber | Unattached | Wellington Phoenix |
| 27 December 2023 | (New Zealand) Rebecca Burrows | Newcastle Jets | (China) Hainan Qiongzhong |
| 29 December 2023 | Mackenzie Hawkesby | (England) Brighton & Hove Albion | Sydney FC |
| 30 December 2023 | Alex Chidiac | Unattached | Melbourne Victory (Note: Player signed a two-and-a-half-year contract.) |
| 4 January 2024 | Alicia Woods | (Australia) Peninsula Power | Brisbane Roar |
| 6 January 2024 | Courtney Newbon | Unattached | Melbourne Victory |
| 12 January 2024 | (New Zealand) Georgia Candy | Unattached | Melbourne Victory |
| 18 January 2024 | Meleri Mullan | Unattached | Adelaide United |
| 23 January 2024 | (New Zealand) Milly Clegg | Western Sydney Wanderers | (United States) Racing Louisville |
| 24 January 2024 | Shelby McMahon | (Australia) Gold Coast Knights | Melbourne City |
| 6 February 2024 | Kaitlyn Torpey | Melbourne City | (United States) San Diego Wave |
| 6 February 2024 | Aimee Medwin | Unattached | Western United |
| 9 February 2024 | (Canada) Lysianne Proulx | Melbourne City | (United States) Bay FC |
| 15 February 2024 | Caley Tallon-Henniker | Unattached | Sydney FC |
| 16 February 2024 | (United States) Hillary Beall | Western United | (United States) Racing Louisville (end of loan) |
| 22 February 2024 | (United States) McKenzie Weinert | Melbourne Victory | (United States) Seattle Reign |
| 22 February 2024 | Ella Buchanan | (Australia) NWS Spirit | Western Sydney Wanderers |
| 22 February 2024 | (Denmark) Kathrine Larsen | (Denmark) Brøndby | Western United |
| 28 February 2024 | (Brazil) Bárbara | Unattached | Melbourne City |
| 8 March 2024 | (United States) Jordan Silkowitz | Brisbane Roar | (United States) Kansas City Current (end of loan) |
| 27 March 2024 | (Chile) María José Rojas | Canberra United | (Chile) Santiago Morning |
| 28 March 2024 | Tiahna Robertson | (Australia) UNSW | Newcastle Jets |
| 17 April 2024 | (New Zealand) Macey Fraser | Wellington Phoenix | (United States) Utah Royals |
| 4 May 2024 | Emily Shields | (Australia) Bulleen Lions | Melbourne City (loan) |

== Re-signings ==
| Date | Name | Club |
|---|---|---|
| 22 February 2023 | (United States) Hannah Keane | Western United |
| 4 April 2023 | Bethany Gordon | Western Sydney Wanderers |
| 18 May 2023 | Amy Chessari (Note: Player signed a two-year extension.) | Western Sydney Wanderers |
| 22 May 2023 | Ella Abdul Massih (Note: Abdul Massih signed a one-year extension until the end of 2024–25.) | Western Sydney Wanderers |
| 23 May 2023 | Melissa Caceres | Western Sydney Wanderers |
| 26 May 2023 | (Republic of Ireland) Deborah-Anne De la Harpe | Sydney FC |
| 26 May 2023 | Jynaya Dos Santos | Sydney FC |
| 26 May 2023 | Indiana Dos Santos | Sydney FC |
| 26 May 2023 | Teigan Collister | Sydney FC |
| 26 May 2023 | Taylor Ray | Sydney FC |
| 26 May 2023 | Tahlia Franco | Sydney FC |
| 9 June 2023 | Kahli Johnson | Western United |
| 13 June 2023 | (New Zealand) Emma Main | Wellington Phoenix |
| 15 June 2023 | (New Zealand) Michaela Robertson | Wellington Phoenix |
| 21 June 2023 | (New Zealand) Mackenzie Barry | Wellington Phoenix |
| 27 June 2023 | (New Zealand) Marisa van der Meer | Wellington Phoenix |
| 5 July 2023 | Gemma Ferris | Western Sydney Wanderers |
| 10 July 2023 | Natasha Rigby | Perth Glory |
| 11 July 2023 | Hana Lowry | Perth Glory |
| 11 July 2023 | Sofia Sakalis | Perth Glory |
| 17 July 2023 | Sadie Lawrence | Perth Glory |
| 17 July 2023 | Sarah Cain | Perth Glory |
| 17 July 2023 | Isabella Foletta | Perth Glory |
| 24 July 2023 | Susan Phonsongkham | Perth Glory |
| 24 July 2023 | Morgan Aquino | Perth Glory |
| 24 July 2023 | Claudia Mihocic | Perth Glory |
| 26 July 2023 | Lauren Allan | Newcastle Jets |
| 26 July 2023 | Lara Gooch | Newcastle Jets |
| 31 July 2023 | (New Zealand) Elizabeth Anton | Perth Glory |
| 1 August 2023 | (New Zealand) Kate Taylor | Wellington Phoenix |
| 3 August 2023 | (New Zealand) Grace Wisnewski | Wellington Phoenix |
| 7 August 2023 | Dylan Holmes (Note: Player signed a three-year extension.) | Adelaide United |
| 8 August 2023 | (New Zealand) Michaela Foster | Wellington Phoenix |
| 9 August 2023 | (New Zealand) Brianna Edwards | Wellington Phoenix |
| 10 August 2023 | (Serbia) Vesna Milivojević | Canberra United |
| 11 August 2023 | Ayesha Norrie | Brisbane Roar |
| 16 August 2023 | (Brazil) Mariel Hecher | Brisbane Roar |
| 17 August 2023 | Hollie Palmer | Brisbane Roar |
| 18 August 2023 | Cassidy Davis | Newcastle Jets |
| 21 August 2023 | (United States) Kayla Morrison (Note: Morrison spent the off-season at Portland Thorns.) | Melbourne Victory |
| 22 August 2023 | (New Zealand) Zoe McMeeken | Wellington Phoenix |
| 22 August 2023 | Cortnee Vine | Sydney FC |
| 22 August 2023 | Lia Privitelli | Melbourne Victory |
| 22 August 2023 | Adriana Taranto | Western United |
| 22 August 2023 | Melissa Taranto | Western United |
| 23 August 2023 | Alana Murphy | Melbourne Victory |
| 23 August 2023 | Leah Davidson | Melbourne City |
| 23 August 2023 | Holly McNamara | Melbourne City |
| 23 August 2023 | Rhianna Pollicina | Melbourne City |
| 24 August 2023 | (United States) Julia Grosso | Melbourne City |
| 24 August 2023 | Ava Briedis | Melbourne Victory |
| 24 August 2023 | Paige Zois | Melbourne Victory |
| 25 August 2023 | Rosie Curtis | Melbourne Victory |
| 25 August 2023 | Elise Kellond-Knight | Melbourne Victory |
| 29 August 2023 | Stacey Papadopoulos | Western United |
| 29 August 2023 | Emma Robers | Western United |
| 29 August 2023 | Leticia McKenna | Melbourne City |
| 30 August 2023 | Emily Condon | Adelaide United |
| 30 August 2023 | Daniela Galic | Melbourne City |
| 30 August 2023 | Naomi Chinnama | Melbourne City |
| 31 August 2023 | Emilia Murray | Adelaide United |
| 31 August 2023 | Katie Bowler | Adelaide United |
| 31 August 2023 | Kijah Stephenson (Note: Player signed a multi-year extension.) | Brisbane Roar |
| 31 August 2023 | Holly McQueen | Brisbane Roar |
| 31 August 2023 | Emily Hodgson | Adelaide United |
| 31 August 2023 | Julia Sardo | Western United |
| 31 August 2023 | (Serbia) Tyla-Jay Vlajnic | Western United |
| 1 September 2023 | Sharn Freier | Brisbane Roar |
| 1 September 2023 | (Philippines) Jaclyn Sawicki | Western United |
| 4 September 2023 | Tamar Levin | Brisbane Roar |
| 5 September 2023 | (Netherlands) Maruschka Waldus | Adelaide United |
| 5 September 2023 | Isabella Shuttleworth | Brisbane Roar |
| 7 September 2023 | Raquel Deralas | Western United |
| 8 September 2023 | (New Zealand) Hannah Wilkinson | Melbourne City |
| 20 September 2023 | Josie Allan | Newcastle Jets |
| 27 September 2023 | Melissa Barbieri | Melbourne City |
| 3 October 2023 | Isabella Accardo | Melbourne City |
| 3 October 2023 | Sophia Varley | Melbourne City |
| 11 October 2023 | Zoe Tolland | Adelaide United |
| 11 October 2023 | Chrissy Panagaris | Adelaide United |
| 11 October 2023 | Erin Kontoutsikos | Adelaide United |
| 11 October 2023 | Grace Wilson | Adelaide United |
| 12 October 2023 | Sham Khamis | Western Sydney Wanderers |
| 14 October 2023 | Karly Roestbakken | Melbourne City |
