= 2024–25 Adelaide United FC (women) season =

16th season in existence of Adelaide United FC (women)

Adelaide United (A-League Women)
2024–25 season
- Chairman: Ned Morris
- Head Coach: Adrian Stenta
- Stadium: Coopers Stadium; Marden Sports Complex
- A-League Women: 3rd
- A-League Women Finals: Semi-final
- Top goalscorer: League: Fiona Worts (11); All: Fiona Worts (11)
- Highest home attendance: 1,022 vs. Melbourne Victory (2 November 2024); A-League Women
- Lowest home attendance: 1,019 vs. Newcastle Jets (8 December 2024); A-League Women
- Average home league attendance: 1,021
- Biggest win: 2–0 vs. Western Sydney Wanderers (A) (2 November 2024); A-League Women; 2–0 vs. Canberra United (A) (16 November 2024); A-League Women; 2–0 vs. Newcastle Jets (H) (8 December 2024); A-League Women
- Biggest defeat: 2–3 vs. Melbourne Victory (H) (2 November 2024); A-League Women; 0–1 vs. Wellington Phoenix (N) (22 November 2024); A-League Women
Home colours	Away colours

The 2024–25 season was Adelaide United Football Club (women)'s 17th season in the A-League Women.

== Players ==
=== Squad information ===
Note: Flags indicate national team as defined under FIFA eligibility rules; some limited exceptions apply. Players may hold more than one non-FIFA nationality.

No.	Pos.	Nation	Player
1	GK	AUS	Annalee Grove
2	DF	AUS	Emily Hodgson
3	FW	AUS	Meleri Mullan (scholarship)
4	DF	AUS	Matilda McNamara
5	MF	AUS	Sarah Morgan
6	MF	AUS	Tiarna Karambasis
7	FW	ENG	Abby Clarke
8	MF	AUS	Emily Condon
10	FW	AUS	Chelsie Dawber
11	FW	AUS	Isabel Hodgson (captain)
12	MF	JPN	Nanako Sasaki
13	DF	AUS	Ella Tonkin
14	DF	DOM	Lucía León

No.	Pos.	Nation	Player
16	MF	AUS	Dylan Holmes (vice-captain)
17	DF	AUS	Zoe Tolland
18	MF	AUS	Lara Kirkby (scholarship)
19	FW	AUS	Katie Bowler
20	MF	AUS	Miley Grigg (youth)
21	GK	AUS	Claudia Jenkins (scholarship)
22	FW	IRL	Erin Healy
23	FW	ENG	Fiona Worts
24	DF	AUS	Abby Middleton (scholarship)
27	MF	AUS	Sian Dewey (youth)
28	FW	AUS	Chrissy Panagaris (scholarship)
30	GK	AUS	Ilona Melegh (youth)

== Transfers ==
=== Transfers in ===
No.	Position	Player	From	Type/fee	Contract length	Date	Ref
4	DF	Matilda McNamara	Unattached	Free transfer	1 year	15 August 2024	
6	MF	Tiarna Karambasis	Unattached	Free transfer	1 year	2 September 2024	
22	FW	(Republic of Ireland) Erin Healy	(Portugal) Clube de Albergaria	Free transfer	1 year	19 September 2024	
23	FW	(England) Fiona Worts	Unattached	Free transfer	1 year	21 September 2024	
14	DF	(Dominican Republic) Lucía León	(England) Watford	Free transfer	1 year	23 September 2024	
7	FW	(England) Abby Clarke	Unattached	Free transfer	1 year	3 October 2024	
24	DF	Abby Middleton	(Australia) Football SA NTC	Scholarship	1 year	29 October 2024	
30	GK	Ilona Melegh	(Australia) Football SA NTC	Youth Development Agreement	1 year	29 October 2024	
18	MF	Lara Kirkby	(United States) Maine Black Bears	Scholarship	6 months	24 December 2024	

=== Transfers out ===
No.	Position	Player	Transferred to	Type/fee	Date	Ref
6	FW	(New Zealand) Hannah Blake	Unattached	End of contract	9 May 2024	
7	FW	(United States) Mariah Lee	Unattached	End of contract	9 May 2024	
9	MF	(New Zealand) Rosetta Taylor	Unattached	End of contract	9 May 2024	
14	DF	(United States) Jenna Holtz	Unattached	End of contract	9 May 2024	
18	DF	Annabel Haffenden	Unattached	End of contract	9 May 2024	
23	FW	Alana Jancevski	Unattached	End of contract	9 May 2024	
26	GK	Grace Wilson	Unattached	End of contract	9 May 2024	
19	DF	(Netherlands) Maruschka Waldus	Unattached	Mutual contract termination	14 May 2024	
22	MF	Emilia Murray	Melbourne City	End of contract	31 July 2024	
4	DF	Erin Kontoutsikos	Unattached	End of contract	29 October 2024	
32	MF	Madeleine Wright	Unattached	End of contract	29 October 2024	

=== Contract extensions ===
No.	Player	Position	Duration	Date	Notes
3	Meleri Mullan	Forward	1 year	16 August 2024	
5	Sarah Morgan	Midfielder	1 year	16 August 2024	
19	Katie Bowler	Forward	2 years	16 August 2024	
17	Zoe Tolland	Defender	2 years	16 August 2024	
13	Ella Tonkin	Defender	1 year	29 August 2024	
1	Annalee Grove	Goalkeeper	2 years	3 September 2024	
21	Claudia Jenkins	Goalkeeper	1 year	3 September 2024	scholarship contract
12	(Japan) Nanako Sasaki	Midfielder	2 years	5 September 2024	
8	Emily Condon	Midfielder	1 year	9 September 2024	
10	Chelsie Dawber	Forward	1 year	21 September 2024	
11	Isabel Hodgson	Forward	2 years	2 October 2024	
20	Miley Grigg	Midfielder	1 year	29 October 2024	youth development agreement
27	Sian Dewey	Midfielder	1 year	29 October 2024	youth development agreement
28	Chrissy Panagaris	Forward	1 year	29 October 2024	scholarship

== Pre-season and friendlies ==
22 September 2024	Adelaide United (Australia)	2–1	(Australia) WNPLSA All-Stars	Adelaide, Australia
14:00 ACST	Healy 38'; Calvanese 67'	Report	?	Stadium: ServiceFM Stadium

26 September 2024	West Adelaide (Australia)	1–4	(Australia) Adelaide United	Adelaide, Australia
19:00 ACST	? (?)	Report	Condon (?); Healy (?); Dewey (?)	Stadium: Kilburn Sportsplex

5 October 2024	Adelaide United (Australia)	2–0	(Australia) Western United	Mildura, Australia
14:00 AEST	Middleton; Grigg	Report		Stadium: Mildura Sporting Precinct

== Competitions ==
=== Overall record ===
Competition	First match	Last match	Final position	Record							
Competition	First match	Last match	Final position	Pld	W	D	L	GF	GA	GD	Win %
A-League Women	2 November 2024	18 April 2025	3rd	23	14	3	6	44	30	+14	60.87
A-League Women Finals	27 April 2025	10 May 2025	Semi-final	3	1	0	2	3	6	−3	33.33
Total				26	15	3	8	47	36	+11	57.69

Last updated: 10 May 2025
Source: Competitions

=== A-League Women ===
==== League table ====
Pos	Team	Pld	W	D	L	GF	GA	GD	Pts	Qualification
1	Melbourne City	23	16	7	0	56	22	+34	55	Qualification for AFC Women's Champions League and Finals series
2	Melbourne Victory	23	16	5	2	42	21	+21	53	Qualification for Finals series
3	Adelaide United	23	14	3	6	44	30	+14	45	Qualification for Finals series
4	Central Coast Mariners (C)	23	9	7	7	31	25	+6	34	Qualification for Finals series
5	Canberra United	23	9	6	8	28	31	−3	33	Qualification for Finals series

Source: A-Leagues
Rules for classification: 1) points; 2) goal difference; 3) goals scored; 4) wins; 5) head-to-head results; 5a) head-to-head points; 5b) head-to-head goal difference; 6) Fair Play points; 7) away goal difference; 8) away goals per match; 9) home goal difference; 10) home goals per match; 11) toss of a coin in an event of a tie of two clubs.
(C) Champions

==== Results summary ====
Overall								Home						Away					
Pld	W	D	L	GF	GA	GD	Pts	W	D	L	GF	GA	GD	W	D	L	GF	GA	GD
23	14	3	6	44	30	+14	45	7	2	3	19	12	+7	7	1	3	25	18	+7

Last updated: 18 April 2025.
Source: Soccerway
Home figures include Adelaide United's 1–0 loss on neutral ground against Wellington Phoenix on 22 November 2024.

==== Results by round ====
Round	1	2	3	4	5	6	7	8	10	9	11	12	13	14	15	16	17	18	19	20	21	22	23
Ground	H	A	A	N	H	A	H	H	A	A	H	A	H	A	H	H	A	H	A	H	A	A	H
Result	L	W	W	L	W	L	L	W	W	D	W	W	D	W	W	D	W	W	L	W	L	W	W
Position	8	5	3	5	4	4	6	4	4	5	4	3	3	3	3	3	3	3	3	3	3	3	3
Points	0	3	6	6	9	9	9	12	15	16	19	22	23	26	29	30	33	36	36	39	39	42	45

Updated to match(es) played on 20 April 2025. Source: Soccerway
A = Away; H = Home; N = Neutral; W = Win; D = Draw; L = Loss; X = Bye

==== Matches ====
Win Draw Loss

All times are local time (ACST/ACDT).

2 November 2024 1	Adelaide United	2–3	Melbourne Victory	Adelaide
16:30	Worts 6', 71'	Report	Gielnik 4', 45+3'; Briedis 90+2'	Stadium: ServiceFM Stadium; Attendance: 1,022; Referee: Kelly Jones

10 November 2024 2	Western Sydney Wanderers	0–2	Adelaide United	Sydney
14:30		Report	Worts 46'; Condon 51'	Stadium: Wanderers Football Park; Attendance: 472; Referee: Caitlin Williams

16 November 2024 3	Canberra United	0–2	Adelaide United	Canberra
15:30		Report	Condon 11'; Worts 35'	Stadium: McKellar Park; Attendance: 1,249; Referee: Rebecca Durcau

22 November 2024 4	Adelaide United	0–1	Wellington Phoenix	Sydney
17:00		Report	McCutcheon 45+3'	Stadium: Netstrata Jubilee Stadium (Note: Match moved from Leichhardt Oval following a pitch assessment.); Attendance: 878; Referee: Isabella Mossin

8 December 2024 5	Adelaide United	2–0	Newcastle Jets	Adelaide
17:00	Worts 44', 63'	Report		Stadium: Marden Sports Complex; Attendance: 1,019; Referee: Beth Rattray

15 December 2024 6	Perth Glory	3–1	Adelaide United	Perth
19:30	Chinnama 24'; Hollar 75' (pen.), 90+1'	Report	Dawber 70'	Stadium: Sam Kerr Football Centre; Attendance: 968; Referee: Mikayla Ryan

20 December 2024 7	Adelaide United	1–3	Melbourne City	Adelaide
16:20	Barbieri 8' (o.g.)	Report	Speckmaier 1'; Dawber 41' (o.g.); McNamara 74'	Stadium: Coopers Stadium; Attendance: 2,404; Referee: Mikayla Ryan

27 December 2024 8	Adelaide United	1–0	Western Sydney Wanderers	Adelaide
16:20	Healy 68'	Report		Stadium: Coopers Stadium; Attendance: 3,809; Referee: Isabella Mossin

4 January 2025 10	Central Coast Mariners	0–1	Adelaide United	Woy Woy
16:30		Report	E. Hodgson 9'	Stadium: Woy Woy Oval; Attendance: 981; Referee: Page Malau-Aduli

8 January 2025 9	Newcastle Jets	3–3	Adelaide United	Newcastle
17:30	J. Allan 75'; Jackson 84'; Adams 90+3'	Report	Worts 4'; Condon 74'; León 78'	Stadium: No.2 Sportsground (Note: Originally the match was scheduled to take place at Maitland Regional Sportsground, but the venue was changed after consideration by the club and Maitland City Council.); Attendance: 923; Referee: Kelly Jones

12 January 2025 11	Adelaide United	2–1	Wellington Phoenix	Adelaide
17:00	Condon 41'; Dawber 44'	Report	León 59' (o.g.)	Stadium: Marden Sports Complex; Attendance: 748; Referee: Beth Rattray

19 January 2025 12	Brisbane Roar	2–3	Adelaide United	Brisbane
17:30	Woods 45'; Yallop 90+3'	Report	Dawber 42', 71'; Healy 47'	Stadium: Perry Park; Attendance: 3,712; Referee: Page Malau-Aduli

25 January 2025 13	Adelaide United	1–1	Western United	Adelaide
17:00	Healy 9'	Report	Zimmerman 61'	Stadium: Marden Sports Complex; Attendance: 786; Referee: Izzy Cooper

31 January 2025 14	Sydney FC	2–3	Adelaide United	Sydney
18:30	dos Santos 65'; Farrow 90+3'	Report	Condon 23', 54'; Dawber 90+4'	Stadium: Leichhardt Oval; Attendance: 1,488; Referee: Sarah Jones

7 February 2025 15	Adelaide United	3–0	Perth Glory	Adelaide
16:20	Healy 16', 90+3'; Dawber 31'	Report		Stadium: Coopers Stadium; Attendance: 1,859; Referee: Bec Mackie

15 February 2025 16	Adelaide United	1–1	Canberra United	Adelaide
16:20	Dawber 73'	Report	Malone 45'	Stadium: Coopers Stadium; Attendance: 2,984; Referee: Mikayla Ryan

2 March 2025 17	Wellington Phoenix	1–3	Adelaide United	Wellington
13:30	Fergusson 41'	Report	Tonkin 4'; León 56', 86'	Stadium: Porirua Park; Referee: Beth Rattray

8 March 2025 18	Adelaide United	1–0	Central Coast Mariners	Adelaide
19:15	Healy 50'	Report		Stadium: Coopers Stadium; Attendance: 8,582; Referee: Izzy Cooper

16 March 2025 19	Melbourne City	4–3	Adelaide United	Melbourne
15:30	McNamara 10', 27', 64'; León 41' (o.g.)	Report	Tonkin 33'; Healy 53'; Tolland 73'	Stadium: ctrl:cyber Pitch; Attendance: 323; Referee: Izzy Cooper

23 March 2025 20	Adelaide United	3–1	Brisbane Roar	Adelaide
17:00	Worts 64', 86'; Dawber 90' (pen.)	Report	Hecher 52'	Stadium: Marden Sports Complex; Referee: Mikayla Ryan

29 March 2025 21	Melbourne Victory	2–1	Adelaide United	Melbourne
16:20	Flannery 69', 90+1'	Report	Holmes 86' (pen.)	Stadium: AAMI Park; Attendance: 1,716; Referee: Izzy Cooper

12 April 2025 22	Western United	1–3	Adelaide United	Melbourne
15:30	Hieda 23'	Report	León 8', 55'; Morgan 14'	Stadium: Ironbark Fields; Attendance: 806; Referee: Georgia Ghirardello

18 April 2025 23	Adelaide United	2–1	Sydney FC	Adelaide
16:20	Worts 46', 76'	Report	Caspers 20'	Stadium: Coopers Stadium; Attendance: 3,527; Referee: Page Malau-Aduli

==== Finals series ====
27 April 2025 Elimination-final	Adelaide United	1–0	Western United	Adelaide
15:30	McNamara 24'	Report		Stadium: Coopers Stadium; Attendance: 3,143; Referee: Molly Godsell

4 May 2025 Semi-final 1st leg	Adelaide United	1–3	Melbourne Victory	Adelaide
15:30	Healy 40'	Report	Gielnik 38'; Bunge 77', 88'	Stadium: Coopers Stadium; Attendance: 4,372; Referee: Caitlin Williams

10 May 2025 Semi-final 2nd leg	Melbourne Victory	3–1 (6–2 agg.)	Adelaide United	Melbourne
17:15 AEST	Lowe 11', 78'; D'Appolonia 61'	Report	Hodgson 90+6'	Stadium: The Home of the Matildas; Attendance: 1,314; Referee: Izzy Cooper

== Statistics ==
=== Appearances and goals ===
Includes all competitions. Players with no appearances not included in the list.

As of match played 10 May 2025

No.	Pos	Nat	Player	Total		A-League Women		A-League Women Finals	
No.	Pos	Nat	Player	Apps	Goals	Apps	Goals	Apps	Goals
2	DF	(Australia) AUS	Emily Hodgson	26	1	23	1	3	0
3	FW	(Australia) AUS	Meleri Mullan	10	0	1+9	0	0	0
4	DF	(Australia) AUS	Matilda McNamara	25	1	22	0	3	1
5	MF	(Australia) AUS	Sarah Morgan	26	1	19+4	1	3	0
6	MF	(Australia) AUS	Tiarna Karambasis	22	0	1+19	0	2	0
7	MF	(England) ENG	Abby Clarke	4	0	0+3	0	1	0
8	MF	(Australia) AUS	Emily Condon	23	5	20+1	5	2	0
10	FW	(Australia) AUS	Chelsie Dawber	20	8	15+2	8	1+2	0
11	FW	(Australia) AUS	Isabel Hodgson	8	1	0+5	0	0+3	1
12	MF	(Japan) JPN	Nanako Sasaki	17	0	9+5	0	0+3	0
13	DF	(Australia) AUS	Ella Tonkin	26	2	23	2	3	0
14	DF	(Dominican Republic) DOM	Lucía León	26	5	23	5	3	0
16	MF	(Australia) AUS	Dylan Holmes	13	1	7+3	1	3	0
17	DF	(Australia) AUS	Zoe Tolland	23	1	23	1	0	0
18	MF	(Australia) AUS	Lara Kirkby	3	0	0+3	0	0	0
19	FW	(Australia) AUS	Katie Bowler	14	0	2+9	0	0+3	0
20	MF	(Australia) AUS	Miley Grigg	6	0	0+6	0	0	0
21	GK	(Australia) AUS	Claudia Jenkins	25	0	22	0	3	0
22	FW	(Republic of Ireland) IRL	Erin Healy	22	8	15+4	7	2+1	1
23	FW	(England) ENG	Fiona Worts	21	11	15+3	11	3	0
24	DF	(Australia) AUS	Abby Middleton	2	0	0+2	0	0	0
27	FW	(Australia) AUS	Sian Dewey	20	0	12+6	0	1+1	0
28	FW	(Australia) AUS	Chrissy Panagaris	9	0	0+8	0	0+1	0
30	GK	(Australia) AUS	Ilona Melegh	1	0	1	0	0	0

=== Disciplinary record ===
Includes all competitions. The list is sorted by squad number when total cards are equal. Players with no cards not included in the list.

As of match played 8 December 2024

Rank	No.	Pos.	Nat.	Name	A-League Women			Total							
Rank	No.	Pos.	Nat.	Name	Yellow card	(yellow card) (yellow-red card)	Red card	Yellow card	(yellow card) (yellow-red card)	Red card					
Rank	No.	Pos.	Nat.	Name	1	2	DF	(Australia)	Emily Hodgson	1	0	0	1	0	0
13	DF	(Australia)	Ella Tonkin	1	1	0	0	1	0	0					
17	DF	(Australia)	Zoe Tolland	1	1	0	0	1	0	0					
23	FW	(England)	Fiona Worts	1	1	0	0	1	0	0					
Total					4	0	0	4	0	0					

=== Clean sheets ===
Includes all competitions. The list is sorted by squad number when total clean sheets are equal. Numbers in parentheses represent games where both goalkeepers participated and both kept a clean sheet; the number in parentheses is awarded to the goalkeeper who was substituted on, whilst a full clean sheet is awarded to the goalkeeper who was on the field at the start of play. Goalkeepers with no clean sheets not included in the list.

As of match played 10 May 2025

Rank	No.	Nat.	Goalkeeper	A-League Women	A-League Women Finals	Total
1	21	(Australia)	Claudia Jenkins	7	1	8

== See also ==
- 2024–25 Adelaide United FC season
