= Lara Kirkby =

Australian soccer player (born 2002)

Personal information
- Date of birth: 14 October 2002 (age 24)
- Place of birth: Adelaide, South Australia, Australia
- Height: 1.70 m (5 ft 7 in)
- Position: Midfielder

Team information
- Current team: Bochum
- Number: 14

College career
Years	Team	Apps	(Gls)
2021–2022	Oregon Ducks	11	(0)
2023–2024	Maine Black Bears	34	(9)

Senior career*
Years	Team	Apps	(Gls)
2018–2019	Adelaide United	1	(0)
2020	West Adelaide	16	(2)
2020–2021	Adelaide United	10	(0)
2024–2025	Adelaide United	3	(0)
2025–	Bochum	13	(1)

International career^{‡}
2018	South Australia		
- * Club domestic league appearances and goals as of 27 January 2026 ‡ National team caps and goals as of 27 January 2026

Lara Kirkby (born 14 October 2002) is an Australian soccer player who plays as a midfielder for 2. Frauen-Bundesliga club VfL Bochum. She previously played for Women's National Premier Leagues South Australia (WNPL SA) club West Adelaide and A-League Women club Adelaide United, and played college soccer for the Oregon Ducks and the Maine Black Bears.

== Early life ==
Kirkby was born on 14 October 2022 in Adelaide, South Australia to mother Petra Heeg and father Stephen Kirkby. She attended Walford Anglican School for Girls, a private Anglican all-girls day and boarding school in the suburb of Hyde Park, where she was highly recognised for her excellence in business studies, mathematics and soccer. She was selected every year from Year 8 onwards for the Independent Girls School Association South Australia (IGSA SA)'s soccer team, despite the team being geared towards students from Year 10 and above.

== College career ==
=== Oregon Ducks ===
Upon moving to the United States, Kirkby first attended university at the University of Oregon in Eugene, Oregon, joining in 2021 to play for the women's soccer team, Oregon Ducks. On her debut as a freshwoman in 2021, she assisted American striker Kaitlyn Paculba's goal against Fresno State Bulldogs in what was her only appearance of the season. She played 10 games in the 2022 season (her sophomore year).

=== Maine Black Bears ===
In 2023 (her junior year), Kirkby moved to the University of Maine in Orono, Maine, where she played soccer for Maine Black Bears and researched in the Maginnis Lab, majoring in biochemistry. In the 2023 season, she played 19 games for the Black Bears (all of which she started), finishing the season with three goals and three assists.

In 2024 (her senior year), Kirkby was once again a key player for the Black Bears, starting all 15 games she played, scoring six goals and assisting four goals. She graduated a semester early in December 2024, graduating with a bachelor's degree in biochemistry. In April 2025, she was named Outstanding Graduating International Student in the College of Earth, Life, and Health Sciences.

== Club career ==
=== Adelaide United (2018–2019) ===
Kirkby signed for W-League club Adelaide United ahead of the 2018–19 season. She played just one match all season, coming on as a substitute in a 4–1 defeat at home to Western Sydney Wanderers on 19 January 2019 at Marden Sports Complex in Marden (aged 16 at the time of the match).

=== West Adelaide (2020) ===
Kirkby signed for Women's National Premier Leagues South Australia (WNPL SA) club West Adelaide ahead of the 2020 season. She finished the season with two goals in 15 matches.

=== Adelaide United (2020–2021) ===
After a season-long hiatus, Kirkby returned to the W-League to rejoin Adelaide United. She made her redebut in the opening round on 30 December 2020, coming on as a substitute in a 4–3 away loss to Canberra United at Viking Park in Wanniassa. She played a total of 10 games throughout the season, but did not score any goals.

=== Adelaide United (2024–2025) ===
After completing university in the United States, Kirkby returned to Australia and re-signed with A-League Women club Adelaide United on a scholarship deal for a third stint at the club. The signing was confirmed at 12:00pm on Christmas Eve (24 December), with a previous post captioned "12pm" leading to speculation from supporters that the new signing would be Australian soccer icon Hayley Raso (a key player for the Australia national team who was at the time contracted at Women's Super League (WSL) club Tottenham Hotspur) due to the presence of a bow in her hair, something both Kirkby and Raso are well-known for. Throughout the 2024–25 season, however, she only played a total of three games for the club, coming on as a substitute in all three: a 3–3 draw away to Newcastle Jets at Newcastle Number 2 Sports Ground in Newcastle West on 8 January 2025, a 3–1 away win over Wellington Phoenix at Jerry Collins Stadium in Cannons Creek, Porirua on 2 March 2025 and a 2–1 away Original Rivalry loss to Melbourne Victory at Melbourne Rectangular Stadium in East Melbourne on 29 March 2025.

=== VfL Bochum (2025–) ===
Ahead of the 2025–26 season, Kirkby moved to Germany and signed for 2. Frauen-Bundesliga club VfL Bochum. On her debut in the opening round, she scored in the 85th minute of a 6–0 win over VfR Warbeyen at the Ruhrstadion in Grumme on 24 August 2025.

== State career ==
Kirkby represented South Australia at the Saitama International Football Tournament in 2018, hosted in Saitama, Japan.

== Personal life ==
Kirkby's native language is English, but is also fluent in German.
