= Jenna Holtz =

American professional soccer player

Personal information
- Full name: Jenna Holtz
- Date of birth: October 28, 1998 (age 28)
- Place of birth: Tacoma, Washington, United States
- Position: Midfielder

Youth career
- Washington Premier F.C.

College career
Years	Team	Apps	(Gls)
2014–2018	Santa Clara Broncos		
2018–2020	Guelph Gryphons	22	(2)

Senior career*
Years	Team	Apps	(Gls)
2018	Seattle Sounders Women		
2020–2021	Valadares Gaia F.C.	8	(1)
2021–2022	OL Reign		
2022	Puerto Rico Sol FC		
2022-2023	CP Cacereño		
2023–2024	Adelaide United FC	21	(0)
- * Club domestic league appearances and goals as of May 9, 2024

Jenna Holtz (born October 25, 1995) is an American soccer player who last played for Adelaide United FC in the A-League Women.

== Early life and career ==
Holtz started playing football at a young age with local club Washington Premier F.C., alongside fellow American Mariah Lee. Holtz played college soccer for Santa Clara Broncos and Guelph Gryphons, before signing with Seattle Sounders FC women's team Sound FC in the Women's Premier Soccer League. As newly appointed Captain, Holtz led the club to the 2018 WPSL season, and subsequent championship undefeated.

Following this, Holtz signed for Campeonato Nacional de Futebol Feminino club Valadares Gaia F.C. in Portugal, and then for OL Reign as a national team replacement player in the NWSL. She then signed for Puerto Rico Sol in the Superior Femenino de la Liga Puerto Rico, before traveling back to Spain where she joined CP Cacereño in the Segunda Federación.

=== Adelaide United ===
Holtz signed for Adelaide United in the A-League Women for the 2023–24 season. In May 2024, the club announced Holtz had departed the club.

== Honors ==
Seattle Sounders

- Women's Premier Soccer League: 2018 Champions
