= Ella Tonkin =

Australian soccer player (born 2002)

Personal information
- Full name: Ella Rose Tonkin
- Date of birth: 14 December 2002 (age 23)
- Height: 1.70 m (5 ft 7 in)

Team information
- Current team: Torreense

Youth career
- Adelaide Croatia Raiders
- Football SA NTC

Senior career*
Years	Team	Apps	(Gls)
2019–2020	Football SA NTC		
2019–2026	Adelaide United	84	(5)
2020–2023	Northern Tigers		
2021	Bankstown City		
2021	Salisbury Inter		
2026–	Torreense	3	(3)

International career^{‡}
2022	Australia U20	3	(0)
2024–2025	Australia U23	5	(0)
- * Club domestic league appearances and goals as of 27 September 2026 ‡ National team caps and goals as of 26 September 2026

Ella Rose Tonkin (born 14 December 2002) is an Australian soccer player who plays as a centre-back for Campeonato Nacional Feminino (Liga BPI) club Torreense. She previously played for National Premier Leagues NSW Women's (NPL NSW Women's) club Northern Tigers and A-League Women club Adelaide United, and has represented Australia at under-20 and under-23 level.

== Early life ==
Tonkin was born on 14 December 2002, and grew up in Adelaide, South Australia. She has two brothers. She first tried playing soccer after being influenced by her brother, who tried out for Adelaide Croatia Raiders. She initially played with boys before later playing with girls.

== Club career ==
=== Adelaide United ===
Tonkin first signed for W-League club Adelaide United during the 2019–20 season. She made her début on 16 February 2020 in a 3–1 defeat away to Canberra United at McKellar Park in McKellar, Canberra, Australian Capital Territory (ACT), coming on as a substitute.

After spending the offseason back at her junior club, Women's National Premier Leagues South Australia (WNPL SA) club Football South Australia National Training Centre (Football SA NTC), for whom she scored three goals in 14 appearances, Tonkin extended her contract with Adelaide United during the 2020–21 season.

After spending the offseason with two National Premier Leagues Women's (NPLW) clubs, Bankstown City in New South Wales (NSW) and later Salisbury Inter in South Australia, Tonkin extended her contract with Adelaide United for a third season ahead of the 2021–22 season.

During the 2022–23 season, Tonkin extended her contract for a fourth and fifth season, signing a two-year contract to keep her at the club until the end of the 2023–24 season.

Tonkin's contract kept her at the club during the 2023–24 season. On 20 October 2023, Tonkin scored her first goal for the club, scoring in a 2–1 defeat to Central Coast Mariners at home at Hindmarsh Stadium in Hindmarsh, Adelaide, South Australia.

Ahead of the 2024–25 season, Tonkin extended her contract with Adelaide United ahead for a sixth season, this time on a one-year contract with an option for a second year. During the season, she was voted Player of the Month (POTM) for January–February through a fan vote, in which she received a commanding 56% of the vote. On 2 March 2025, she scored her first goal of the season and her second for the club, scoring in a 3–1 away victory over Wellington Phoenix at Jerry Collins Stadium in Cannons Creek, Porirua, New Zealand. Two matchweeks later, on 16 March 2025, she scored her second of the season and third for the club, scoring in a 4–3 defeat away to Melbourne City at the City Football Academy in Cranbourne East, Melbourne, Victoria. At the club's annual end-of-season awards ceremony (the Alagić-Vidmar Awards), she was voted the Women's Players' Player using a 3-2-1 voting system.

The option on Tonkin's contract for a second year at Adelaide United was triggered, with the 2025–26 season being her seventh at the club. She scored her first goal of the season and her fourth for the club on 31 January 2026 in a 2–1 victory over Melbourne City at home. Two matchweeks later, she scored her second of the season and her fifth for the club on 22 February 2026 in a 2–0 away victory over Brisbane Roar at Spencer Park in Newmarket, Brisbane, Queensland. At the Alagić-Vidmar Awards, she was awarded the Dianne Alagić Medal, the award given to the women's team's best player of the season, as well as a second consecutive Players' Player award.

Ahead of the 2026–27 season, she departed the club for a then-unconfirmed opportunity in Europe.

=== Torreense ===
Tonkin moved to Portugal and signed for Campeonato Nacional Feminino (Liga BPI) club Torreense ahead of the 2026–27 season, joining fellow Australian Sophie Hoban (a midfielder) at the club. She made her début on 6 August 2026 in a 2–1 away defeat to Italian side Juventus in the UEFA Women's Champions League (UWCL) second qualifying round at Stadio La Marmora-Pozzo in Biella, Italy. In the next match of the round (due to the mini tournament format used), held at the same stadium, she scored her first goal for the club in a 5–2 victory over Albanian side Apolonia Fier. On her league début on 13 September 2026, the opening day, she scored her first league goal for the club in a 3–0 victory over Rio Ave at home at the Estádio Nacional in Linda a Pastora, Queijas, Lisbon District. The following week, she scored again in a 3–0 away victory over Vitória Guimarães at the Academia Vitória SC in Oliveira do Castelo, Guimarães, Braga District. She extended her goalscoring streak to three league matches in a row a week later, scoring in an 8–0 victory over Marítimo at home.

== International career ==
=== Australia U20 ===
Tonkin was selected for the Australia under-20 national team as part of head coach Leah Blayney's 21-player squad for the 2022 FIFA U-20 Women's World Cup in Costa Rica from 10 to 28 August 2022. She played every minute of Australia's campaign at the tournament, which ended in the group stage after finishing third in Group A (behind Spain and Brazil but ahead of hosts Costa Rica.

=== Australia U23 ===
Tonkin was selected for the Australia under-23 national team as part of head coach Joe Palatsides' 23-player squad for the 2025 ASEAN Women's Championship (a senior tournament), held from 6 to 19 August 2025 in Vietnam. Australia won the tournament, winning their first title and becoming the first under-23 team to win the senior tournament.

== Honours ==
Australia U23

- ASEAN Women's Championship

Champions: 2025

Individual

- A-League Women Player of the Month: 2024–25: January–February
- Adelaide United Women's Players' Player: 2024–25, 2025–26
- Dianne Alagić Medal: 2025–26

== Personal life ==
Tonkin aspires to play for the Australia national team (the Matildas), to play in the Women's Super League (WSL) and to travel the world, especially Europe (particularly England). She has described fellow Adelaidean defender and former Adelaide United teammate Charli Grant, a left-back for the Matildas, as a major inspiration, stating that her achievements inspire her to reach her full potential.

Tonkin is pursuing a bachelor's degree in business studies at Griffith University.
