= Hana Lowry =

Australian soccer player

Personal information
- Full name: Hana Ann Lowry
- Date of birth: 23 April 2003 (age 23)
- Place of birth: Murdoch, Western Australia, Australia
- Height: 1.75 m (5 ft 9 in)
- Position: Midfielder

Team information
- Current team: Vålerenga
- Number: 10

Youth career
- Cockburn City
- WA NTC

Senior career*
Years	Team	Apps	(Gls)
2019–2024	Perth Glory	72	(11)
2024–2026	Sydney FC	14	(1)
2026–	Vålerenga	3	(1)
2026–	Vålerenga 2	1	(0)

International career^{‡}
2018–2020	Australia U17	8	(4)
2022–2023	Australia U20	4	(0)
2022–	Australia U23	5	(1)
2024–	Australia	0	(0)
- * Club domestic league appearances and goals as of 15 April 2026 ‡ National team caps and goals as of 17 December 2024

Hana Ann Lowry (/ˈlaʊri/; born 23 April 2003) is an Australian soccer player who plays for Toppserien club Vålerenga IF and the Australia national team. She previously played for A-League Women clubs Perth Glory and Sydney FC.

== Early life ==
Lowry was born in Murdoch, a suburb of Perth, Western Australia. Growing up, she was spotted as a talented junior. She was one of 5 Western Australian players in the Australian squad for the 2019 AFC U-16 Women's Championship. She scored twice against Thailand, and another in the 3rd place playoff against China for a total of 3 for the tournament.

== Club career ==
=== Perth Glory ===
Lowry was selected in the Perth Glory squad for the 2019–20 W-League. She played several games off the bench, and was selected to start against Newcastle Jets. In this starting appearance Lowry scored her first W-League goal in a 4–2 victory.

At the conclusion of the 2023–24 season, Lowry was named "Most Glorious Player" by Perth Glory at their annual end-of-season awards ceremony.

On 8 August 2024, the club announced Lowry's departure.

=== Sydney FC ===
Lowry signed for Sydney FC ahead of the 2024–25 season.

At the end of the 2025–26 season, pundit Teo Pellizzeri announced on the program DubZone that she and teammate Tori Tumeth would be departing the club to pursue opportunities overseas. She departed the club in April 2026 to sign for Toppserien club Vålerenga IF for an undisclosed fee.

=== Vålerenga IF ===
Lowry moved to Norway and signed for Toppserien club Vålerenga IF during the 2026 season. On her debut in May 2026, she scored her first goal for the club in a 7–1 victory over Bodø/Glimt at Intility Arena.

== International career ==
In November 2024, Lowry received her first senior call up to the Australian national team. Two days before the friendly against Brazil, her club confirmed that she had suffered a anterior cruciate ligament (ACL) injury and would be out for the season.
