= Hannah Blake =

English-born New Zealand footballer

Personal information
- Full name: Hannah Elizabeth Blake
- Date of birth: 5 May 2000 (age 26)
- Place of birth: London, England
- Height: 1.71 m (5 ft 7 in)
- Position: Forward

Team information
- Current team: Rangers
- Number: 10

College career
Years	Team	Apps	(Gls)
2019–2022	Michigan Wolverines	47	(6)

Senior career*
Years	Team	Apps	(Gls)
2015–2019	Three Kings United		
2023	Perth Glory	9	(3)
2023–2024	Adelaide United	21	(3)
2024–2026	Durham	34	(4)
2026–	Rangers	10	(2)

International career^{‡}
2015–2016	New Zealand U17	3	(3)
2016–2018	New Zealand U20	4	(1)
2017–	New Zealand	12	(4)
- * Club domestic league appearances and goals as of 16 November 2026. ‡ National team caps and goals as of 23 May 2026.

Hannah Elizabeth Blake (born 5 May 2000) is a professional footballer who has plays as a forward for Rangers in the Scottish Women's Premier League and represented New Zealand in association football at both age group and international level.

== College career ==
During her time at college, starting in 2019, Blake played soccer for the Michigan Wolverines in the NCAA Division I, studying on a soccer scholarship. She graduated in late 2022 earning a Bachelor of Arts in communications and media together with a minor in business administration. She felt the playing style was different, including a physical style of play. While playing, she used her international experience with New Zealand's national team to improve her game.

== Club career ==
From 2015 until 2019, Blake played for New Zealand club Three Kings United in the Lotto NRFL Women's Premier League.

In January 2023, after graduating from college, Blake signed her first professional contract with A-League Women club Perth Glory, signing as an injury replacement player for Rylee Baisden until the end of the 2022–23 A-League Women season. She scored on her debut in a 3–1 win against Western United in February.

In August 2023, following the end of her contract at Perth Glory, Blake was signed by fellow A-League Women club Adelaide United. In May 2024, Adelaide United announced that Blake departed the club.

On 8 July 2024, Blake was announced at Durham on a permanent transfer.

On 7 July 2026, it was announced that Blake had joined Rangers on a one-year deal and would wear the number 10.

== International career ==
Blake was a member of the New Zealand U-17 side at the 2016 FIFA U-17 Women's World Cup in Jordan, the 2016 FIFA U-20 Women's World Cup in Papua New Guinea, and again at the 2018 FIFA U-20 Women's World Cup in France.

Blake made her senior début as a substitute in a 0–0 draw with Thailand on 25 November 2017. On 2 March 2026, Blake scored a hat-trick in a World Cup qualification match against the Solomon Islands. The Football Ferns would go on to win 8–0.

== International goals ==
No.	Date	Venue	Opponent	Score	Result	Competition
1.	2 March 2026	National Stadium, Honiara, Solomon Islands	Solomon Islands	3–0	8–0	2027 FIFA Women's World Cup qualification
2.	2 March 2026	National Stadium, Honiara, Solomon Islands	Solomon Islands	5–0	8–0	2027 FIFA Women's World Cup qualification
3.	2 March 2026	National Stadium, Honiara, Solomon Islands	Solomon Islands	6–0	8–0	2027 FIFA Women's World Cup qualification
4.	11 April 2026	FMG Stadium Waikato, Hamilton, New Zealand	Fiji	5–0	5–0	2027 FIFA Women's World Cup qualification
