= Deborah-Anne De la Harpe =

Irish footballer (born 2000)

Personal information
- Full name: Deborah-Anne de la Harpe
- Date of birth: 5 April 2000 (age 26)
- Place of birth: Caringbah, New South Wales, Australia
- Position: Defender

Team information
- Current team: Norrköping

Youth career
- WA NTC

Senior career*
Years	Team	Apps	(Gls)
2020–2022	Perth Glory	26	(1)
2022	APIA Leichhardt	21	(3)
2022–2023	Sydney FC	15	(0)
2023	HB Køge	8	(2)
2023–2025	Brisbane Roar	36	(3)
2025–	Norrköping	16	(1)

International career^{‡}
2019	Australia U19	1	(0)
2023–	Republic of Ireland	1	(0)
- * Club domestic league appearances and goals as of 4 May 2026 ‡ National team caps and goals as of 4 May 2026

Deborah-Anne de la Harpe (born 5 April 2000) is a soccer player who plays for Damallsvenskan club IFK Norrköping. She has previously played for A-League Women clubs Perth Glory, Sydney FC and Brisbane Roar, and for Danish Women's League club HB Køge. She has represented Australia (where she was born) and the Republic of Ireland at under-19 and senior levels, respectively.

== Club career ==
=== Perth Glory, 2020–2022 ===
In December 2020, De la Harpe joined Perth Glory for the 2020–21 W-League season. She started in all twelve matches for the club. Perth Glory finished in last place after failing to win a single game. In May 2021, she re-signed with the club for the 2021–22 A-League Women season.

=== Sydney FC, 2022–2023 ===
Ahead of the 2022–23 A-League Women season, in September 2022, it was announced that De la Harpe had joined fellow Australian club Sydney FC.

=== HB Køge, 2023 ===
In July 2023, after signing a contract extension with Sydney FC, De la Harpe transferred to Danish club HB Køge. In December 2023, De la Harpe departed the club after scoring 2 goals in 8 appearances.

=== Brisbane Roar, 2023–2025 ===
Following her departure from Danish club HB Køge, De la Harpe returned to Australia, signing with Brisbane Roar until the end of the 2023–24 A-League Women season. In September 2024, she re-signed with the club for the 2024–25 A-League Women season. After making 36 appearances and scoring three goals for Brisbane Roar, De la Harpe departed the club in August 2025.

=== Norrköping, 2025– ===
In August 2025, De la Harpe joined Swedish club Norrköping, signing a one-year contract.

== International career ==
In 2018, De La Harpe was named to the Junior Matildas squad to compete at the 2019 AFC U-16 Qualifiers. In 2019, she competed at the 2019 AFC U-19 Women's Championship.

In 2023, she was included in Vera Pauw's Republic of Ireland squad, qualifying through her County Antrim born mother, ahead of upcoming friendlies.

Appearances and goals by national team and year
National team	Year	Apps
Republic of Ireland	2023	1
Total		1
