= Nanako Sasaki =

Japanese footballer (born 1999)

Personal information
- Date of birth: 16 March 1999 (age 27)
- Place of birth: Japan
- Position: Midfielder

Team information
- Current team: Canberra United
- Number: 33

Senior career*
Years	Team	Apps	(Gls)
2017–2020	Adelaide City		
2021	Adelaide Comets	24	(4)
2021–2025	Adelaide United	67	(4)
2025–	Canberra United	0	(0)
- * Club domestic league appearances and goals as of 4 September 2025

Nanako Sasaki (佐々木菜捺子, Sasaki Nanako; pronounced [sasaki nanako]; born 16 March 1999) is a Japanese professional footballer who plays for Canberra United in the A-League Women.

== Early life and career ==
Sasaki came to Australia in 2017 with the primary intention of learning English to help fulfil her dream of becoming a flight attendant with Qantas. Her football career was seen as just a hobby.

Sasaki signed for Women's National Premier Leagues South Australia club Adelaide City where over a period of 4 seasons she won several team and individual honors. For the 2021 season she signed with cross-town club Adelaide Comets where she scored 4 goals throughout the season, which led to Adelaide United offering her a contract. After a successful opening season with Adelaide United, Sasaki was signed to a two-year extension. In September 2024, she signed a further two-year extension. A year later, in August 2025, Sasaki departed the club by mutual consent. The following month, in September 2025, Sasaki was signed by Canberra United ahead of the 2025–26 A-League Women season.
