= Dylan Holmes =

Australian football player (born 1997)

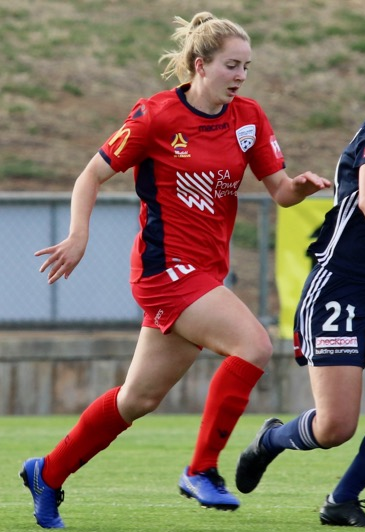
- Holmes in 2018 with Adelaide United

Personal information
- Full name: Dylan Avery Holmes
- Date of birth: 22 March 1997 (age 29)
- Place of birth: São Paulo, Brazil
- Position: Central midfielder

Youth career
- Cumberland United

Senior career*
| Years | Team | Apps | (Gls) |
| 2014–2015 | Adelaide United | 7 | (0) |
| 2016 | Fulham United | 15 | (2) |
| 2016–2018 | Adelaide City | 48 | (8) |
| 2018–2021 | Adelaide United | 34 | (3) |
| 2019–2021 | Adelaide City | 54 | (24) |
| 2021 | BK Häcken | 10 | (0) |
| 2021–2026 | Adelaide United | 49 | (5) |
| 2024- | West Torrens Birkalla | 14 | (9) |

International career
| 2021– | Australia | 1 | (0) |
- * Club domestic league appearances and goals as of 28 May 2024

Dylan Avery Holmes (/ˈeɪ.və.ɹi ˈhoʊmz/; born 22 March 1997) is an Australian professional women's footballer who last played as a midfielder for Adelaide United in the A-League Women.

== Early life and education ==
Holmes was born to English and American parents in São Paulo, Brazil. Throughout her childhood, Holmes spent time living in Northern California, Santiago and Ilo. In 2007, Holmes moved to Adelaide, South Australia. She attended Scotch College and graduated in 2014 after doing well academically and being captain in her final year. Her home town is Heathfield, in the Adelaide Hills.

== Club career ==
=== Adelaide United (2018–2021) ===
Holmes returned to Adelaide United for the first time since the 2014 W-League season where as she played only seven games. She played her first game for the season in a 0–0 against Melbourne Victory.

=== Adelaide City (2019–2021) ===
In February 2019, Holmes returned to Adelaide City ahead of the 2019 WNPL (Women's National Premier Leagues) season.

=== BK Häcken (2021) ===
Holmes joined Swedish reigning champions Häcken ahead of the 2021 season, viewing the move as an opportunity "to play European football at a very high level".

=== Adelaide United (2021–2026) ===
In December 2021, after making 15 appearances in all competitions for Häcken, Holmes returned to Australia, re-joining Adelaide United for the remainder of the 2021–22 A-League Women season.

In July 2026, Holmes departed Adelaide United to complete an international master's degree in Management, Law and Humanities of Sport.

== International career ==
Holmes made her debut for the Australian national team on 13 April 2021, playing the second half of a 5–0 loss to the Netherlands in a friendly.

== Style of play ==
Holmes is known for her composure on the ball and ability to control the tempo of games.
