= Fiona Worts =

English footballer

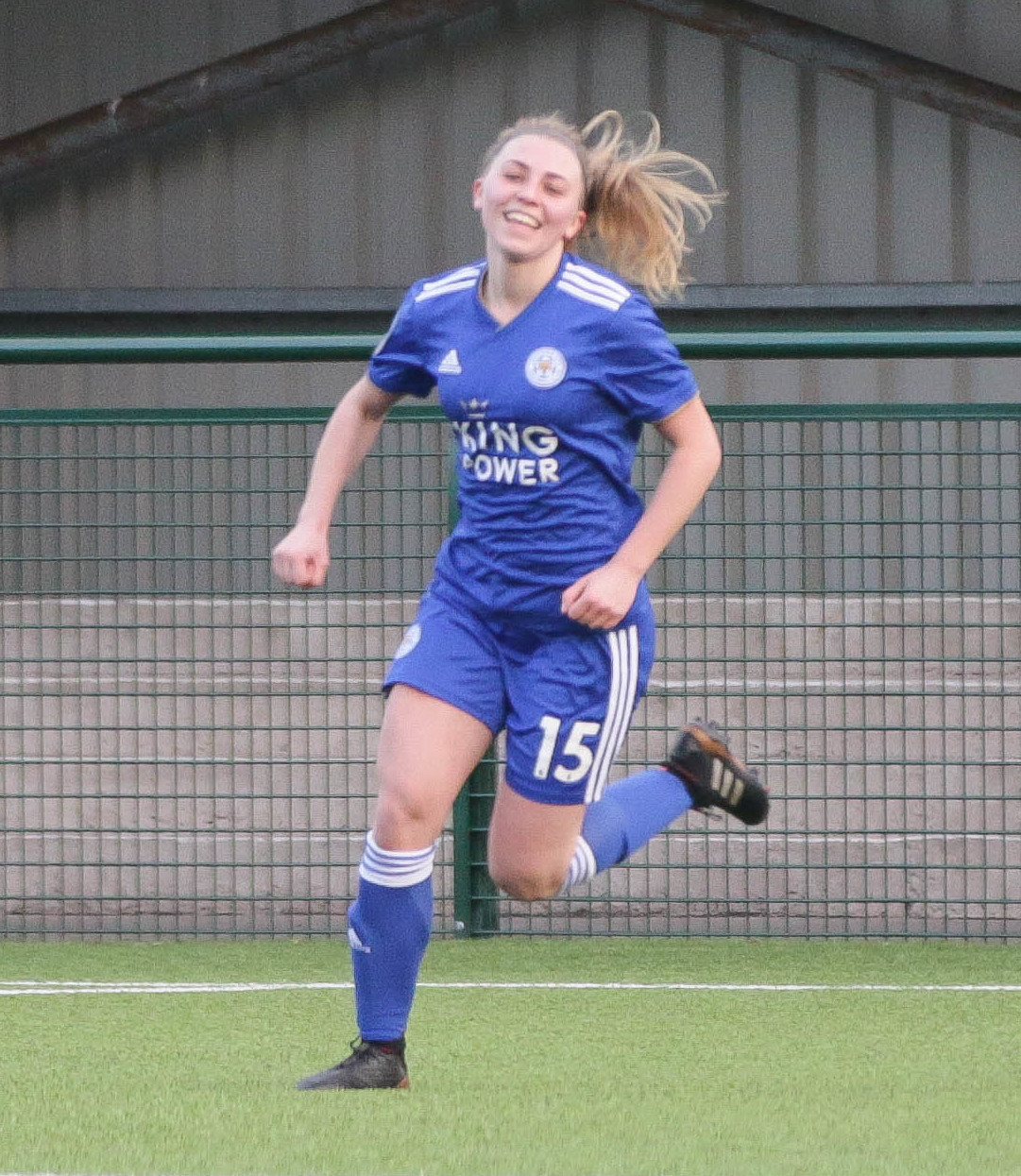
- Playing for Leicester City in 2019

Personal information
- Full name: Fiona Helen Worts
- Date of birth: 30 January 1996 (age 30)
- Place of birth: Nottingham, England
- Position: Forward

Team information
- Current team: Incheon Hyundai Steel Red Angels

Youth career
- Nottingham Forest
- Leicester City

Senior career*
| Years | Team | Apps | (Gls) |
| 2013–2016 | Leicester City | | |
| 2017 | Adelaide University | | |
| 2017–2018 | Guiseley Vixens | | |
| 2018–2019 | Leicester City | 6 | (3) |
| 2019–2020 | Coventry United | 12 | (1) |
| 2020 | Fulham United FC | | |
| 2020–2023 | Adelaide United | 39 | (18) |
| 2022 | → LSK Kvinner (loan) | 10 | (3) |
| 2023–2024 | Sydney FC | 6 | (3) |
| 2024–2026 | Adelaide United | 34 | (14) |
| 2026– | Incheon Hyundai Steel Red Angels | 0 | (0) |
- * Club domestic league appearances and goals as of 26 March 2026

Fiona Helen Worts (/wɜːrts/; born 30 January 1996) is an English professional footballer who plays for WK League side Incheon Hyundai Steel Red Angels.

== Youth career ==
Worts spent her youth career at the Centres of Excellence of Notts County, Nottingham Forest and Leicester City.

== Club career ==
Worts began her senior career with Leicester City, taking the train from Leeds to Leicester for home matches while studying at the University of Leeds. As a student, she spent a year abroad in Australia, briefly playing in the National Premier Leagues Women's for Adelaide University. Upon her return to the UK, Worts signed with Guiseley Vixens in the third tier English National Premier League. After a season there she returned to Leicester, now playing in the FA Women's Championship. During her time with Leicester she scored 36 times in 54 appearances. After being released by Leicester, Worts played for Coventry United for a few months before returning to Australia.

For the 2020–21 W-League season, Worts signed with Adelaide United. In the 2021–22 season she was the top goal scorer in the rebranded A-League Women with 13 goals, and won the Julie Dolan Medal. She was the first Adelaide player in history to win the Golden Boot in the women's competition.

In March 2022 she agreed her return to Adelaide United for the following season, but joined Norwegian Toppserien club LSK Kvinner FK on loan in the meantime.

In September 2023, Worts joined Sydney FC. She went on to win the A League championship with them, although she only played in six games due to an injury. She left the club in July 2024 and returned to Adelaide United shortly afterwards.

In March 2026, Worts departed Adelaide United as the joint all-time leading goalscorer, netting the club a record transfer fee. She joined South Korean club Incheon Hyundai Steel Red Angels.

== Style of play ==
Worts is a striker, operating mostly as a number nine and known for her goalscoring ability.

== Personal life ==
Worts has a degree in mathematics from the University of Leeds. During her successful 2021–22 season in Australia she combined her football career with working in McDonald's. She has also worked in business administration at Kite Property, one of Adelaide United's main sponsors.

== Honours ==
=== Sydney FC ===
- A League women: 2023–2024

=== Individual ===
- A League Women Golden Boot: 2021–22
- Julie Dolan Medal: 2021–22

=== Records ===
- A League Women most goals in a match: 5 (5 January 2022) (Note: Tied with Kate Gill and Hannah Wilkinson)
