= Grace Wilson (soccer) =

Australian football player (born 2005)

Personal information
- Full name: Grace Carty Wilson
- Date of birth: 5 March 2005 (age 21)
- Height: 1.78 m (5 ft 10 in)
- Position: Goalkeeper

Team information
- Current team: Maine Black Bears
- Number: 30

College career
| Years | Team | Apps | (Gls) |
| 2024– | Maine Black Bears | 9 | (0) |

Senior career*
| Years | Team | Apps | (Gls) |
| 2021–2024 | Adelaide United | 1 | (0) |

International career
| 2024 | Australia U-20 | 0 | (0) |
- * Club domestic league appearances and goals as of 15:09, 26 October 2025 (UTC)

Grace Carty Wilson (born 4 March 2005) is an Australian footballer who plays as a goalkeeper for the Maine Black Bears. They were the first Australian professional soccer player to come out as non-binary.

== Early life and education ==
Grace Wilson was born on 4 March 2005.

== Youth career ==
At the age of 12, Wilson was selected by SAPSASA (South Australian Primary School Amateur Sports Association) to train in association football.

They played in various girls' teams while in high school, as well as Football SA U15 Girls, and then played for Adelaide University SC.

== Club career ==
In 2021, aged 16, Wilson played eight games with Football South Australia NTC. In December 2021, they signed by Adelaide United. for the 2021/2022 season.

They represented FSA NTC as number one goalie in the WPNL (SA) after the end of the A-League season in March 2022, where they also had a leadership position.

In September 2022, they rejoined Adelaide United on an amateur basis.

In May 2024, Adelaide United announced Wilson's departure.

In 2024, they joined the Maine Black Bears in American college soccer.

== International career ==
In February 2024, Wilson, along with 22 other players, was called up to play with the Young Matildas for the 2024 AFC U-20 Women's Asian Cup, taking place on 3–16 March 2024 in Uzbekistan.

== Recognition ==
On 8 October 2022 Wilson was named as Female Rising Star for their season with Football SA NTC, in Football South Australia's annual awards night.

== Personal life ==
Wilson's sister also plays or played as goalkeeper.

Having had family members who had died of cancer, while still at school, Wilson had their long hair cut off and head shaved in order to raise funds for the Leukaemia Foundation. They raised A$1,000 as an individual, taking advantage of their social media profile, and also donated their ponytail to the charity. Their school also raised over A$10,000 on the day.

On 1 March 2024 it was widely reported in Australian mainstream media and LGBT online sources that Wilson had just come out as non-binary, making them the first professional footballer in the country to do so. Adelaide United pledged their support and solidarity with Wilson. Wilson said, in an interview with Adelaide United: "“My gender and my perception of gender doesn’t fit into the western standards of man or woman... For me personally, I don’t really feel anywhere near that. I feel separated from that. Other non-binary people might feel in between or a bit of both, or they may have that fluidity."
