= Mariah Lee =

American soccer player (born 1996)

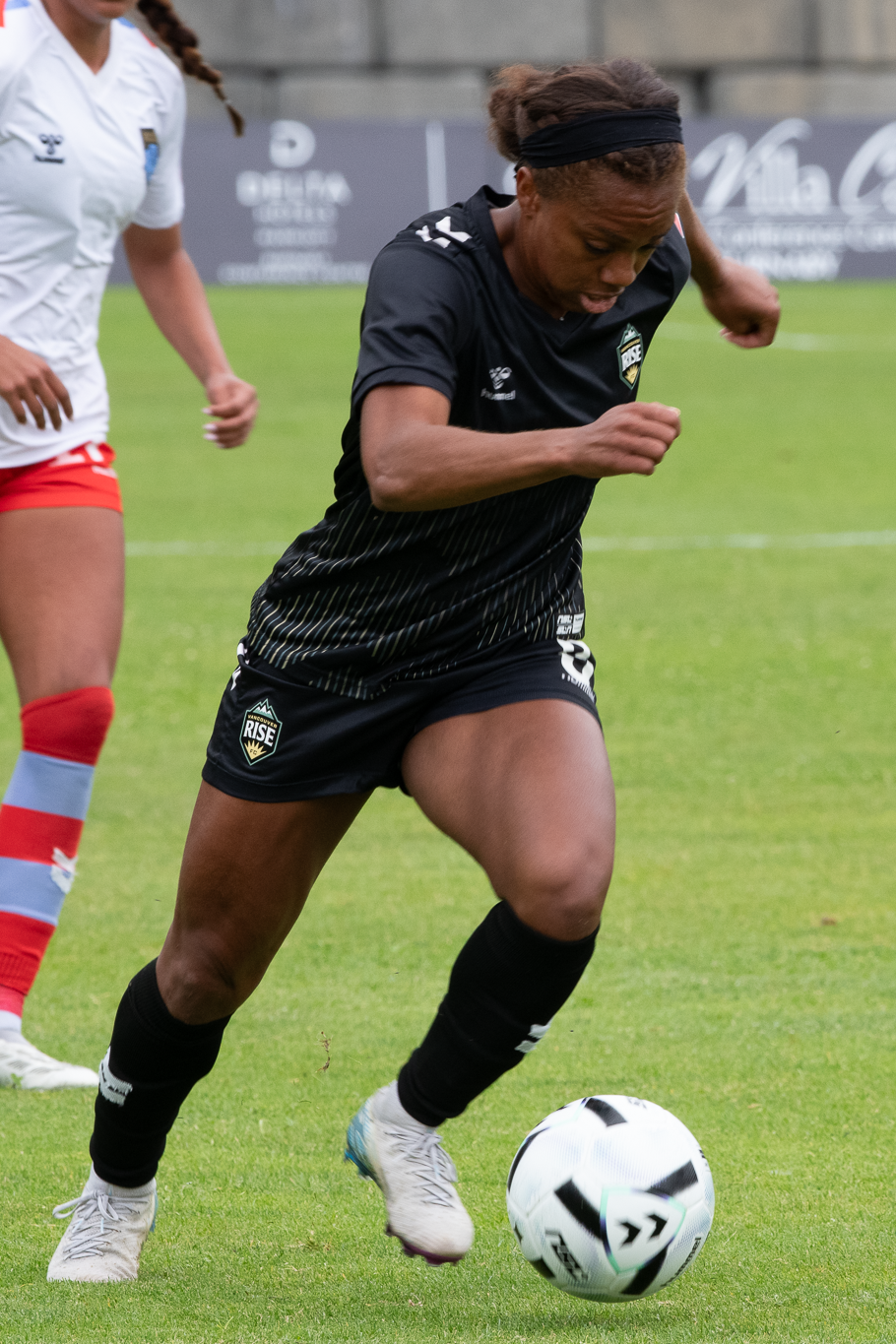
- Lee playing for Vancouver Rise FC in 2025

Personal information
- Full name: Mariah Allison Lee
- Date of birth: June 30, 1996 (age 30)
- Place of birth: Covington, Washington, United States
- Height: 5 ft 4 in (1.63 m)
- Position: Forward

College career
Years	Team	Apps	(Gls)
2014–2017	Stanford Cardinal	59	(5)
2018	Wake Forest Demon Deacons	13	(1)

Senior career*
Years	Team	Apps	(Gls)
2019	FF Lugano		
2020	OL Reign	0	(0)
2021	Celtic	11	(6)
2021–2022	Nordsjælland	19	(6)
2022	Sporting de Huelva	5	(0)
2023–2024	Adelaide United	14	(2)
2024	FC Olympia	1	(0)
2024	DC Power	12	(0)
2025–2026	Vancouver Rise	34	(6)
- * Club domestic league appearances and goals as of July 27, 2026

Mariah Allison Lee (born June 30, 1996) is an American former professional soccer player who played as a forward.

== Club career ==
=== OL Reign ===
Lee made her NWSL debut in the 2020 NWSL Challenge Cup on July 8, 2020.

=== FC Nordsjaelland ===
Lee transferred from Celtic to Danish club, FC Nordsjaelland in August 2021 for the 2021/22 season. In August 2022 the club announced her departure to Sporting Club Huelva.

=== Adelaide United ===
In October 2023, Lee joined Australian club Adelaide United. In May 2024, the club announced Lee's departure.

=== DC Power ===
She began 2024 with FC Olympia in the USL W League.

In July 2024, Lee was announced as a member of the inaugural roster for DC Power of the USL Super League. Lee and DC mutually agreed to terminate her contract with the club in February 2025.

=== Vancouver Rise ===
On February 6, 2025, Vancouver Rise announced they had signed Lee ahead of the inaugural Northern Super League season.

== Honors ==
Stanford Cardinal

- NCAA Division I Women's Soccer Championship: 2017
