= Maruschka Waldus =

Dutch football player (born 1992)

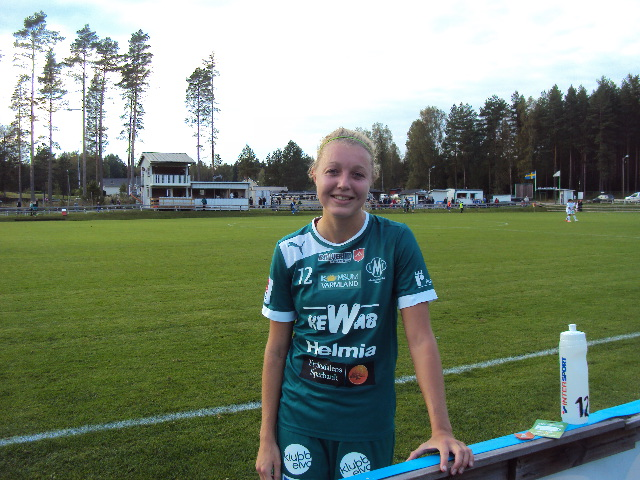
- Waldus at Mallbackens IF Stadium in 2015

Personal information
- Full name: Maruschka Waldus
- Date of birth: 20 September 1992 (age 34)
- Place of birth: Heerenveen, Netherlands
- Height: 1.78 m (5 ft 10 in)
- Positions: Midfielder; defender

College career
Years	Team	Apps	(Gls)
2014	Alabama Crimson Tide	20	(3)

Senior career*
Years	Team	Apps	(Gls)
2011–2014	SC Heerenveen	68	(9)
2015	Sky Blue FC	1	(0)
2015	Mallbackens IF	12	(1)
2016	Turbine Potsdam	4	(0)
2016	1. FFC Turbine Potsdam II	3	(0)
2016–2017	FC Twente	22	(2)
2017	Fylkir	6	(2)
2017–2018	Western Sydney Wanderers	12	(1)
2018	Avaldsnes	22	(1)
2018–2019	Western Sydney Wanderers	10	(0)
2019–2020	Vålerenga IF	34	(4)
2021	Adelaide United	11	(2)
2021–2022	PSV	24	(2)
2022–2024	Adelaide United	38	(1)
2024–2025	Feyenoord	22	(2)
- * Club domestic league appearances and goals as of 14 May 2024

Maruschka Waldus (born 20 September 1992) is a retired Dutch football player.

She made her debut in May 2015 in the NWSL, being the first Dutch soccer player in the NWSL. Together with Marlous Pieëte, Maruschka Waldus in 2017 was the first Dutch soccer player to play in the W-League in Australia.

== Career ==
Waldus was a two-time member of the KNVB Talent Team (2009 and 2010) in Amsterdam and attended the Johan Cruyff Academy in the Netherlands.

In 2011, she played three seasons for the soccer club SC Heerenveen near her home town, first in the Eredivisie, which changed later to the BeNe League. She was named to the women's first team for three consecutive seasons and was team captain in each of the last two seasons. She scored nine goals during her career at Heerenveen, including six in 2013.

In August 2014 Waldus came to the Alabama Crimson Tide of the University of Alabama USA, as a senior, and made an immediate impact early in the season on the defensive side of the ball. About halfway through the season, she became a defensive midfielder. She started and played in all 20 games of the season and scored three goals.

In 2015 Waldus earned a spot on the roster of Sky Blue FC. In the summer of 2015 she signed a contract in Sweden with Mallbackens IF, which plays in Damallsvenskan, the highest division, for the rest of the season.

In January 2016 she signed for the German side Turbine Potsdam, where she played the second half of the 2015–2016 season. At the end of the season she moved from Germany to the Netherlands to the champion of the Dutch first Division FC Twente. After playing three games in the qualifying round of the UEFA Women's Champions League, FC Twente was placed for the first round, in which they encountered Sparta Praha from Czech Republic (2–0 win at home and 1–3 win at Praha). In the second round they had to play Barcelona. After a 1–0 loss in Barcelona, FC Twente had chances in the home game, but FC Barcelona scored the goals: 0–4. Statistics of the home game Fc Twente ended second this season.

In July 2017 in Iceland the competition was halfway. Fylkir from Reykyavik was the next club that asked her to come over to Iceland to play in the Icelandic competition: Úrvalsdeild. The coach was Hermann Hreiðarsson who played in the national team and in the Premier League in England.

In September 2017, Waldus joined Australian club Western Sydney Wanderers, together with fellow countrywoman Marlous Pieëte. The competition, the W-League, ended in February 2018.

In March 2018 Waldus signed a contract with Avaldsnes Idrettslag in Norway playing the Toppserien and in the UEFA Women's Champions League. After a few games she became captain of the team. In the UEFA Women's Champions League, after playing a qualifying round in Kroatia, they encountered winner of the 2017–2018 edition Olympique Lyonnais Féminin. In Norway, in Haugesund after the first half 0–0 they lost with 0–2 and in Lyon the result was 5–0 in favour of Olympique Lyonnais Féminin. In the Norwegian competition Toppserien Avaldsnes Idrettslag ended 9 out of 12 participating teams.

In November 2018, after the end of the Norwegian Season, Maruschka continued her career in Australia and went to play for the second season in a row for Western Sydney Wanderers for the 2018–19 W-League season.

In March 2019 The Flying Dutchman or The Happy Soccer Nomad returned to Norway and signed a two-year contract with Vålerenga IF to play in the Toppserien. At Vålerenga IF she met for third time in her career Frysian and Dutch soccer player Sherida Spitse. In 2019 Vålerenga IF ended second in the national competition, the Toppserien. They also reached the final of the Norwegian Women's Cup, in which they lost from LSK Kvinner. 2019 was the best season of Vålerenga IF up to now. Maruschka Waldus (defense: central back), Sherida Spitse (midfield: central) and Ajara Nchout (attack: right wing) of Vålerenga IF were selected in the Team Of The Year 2019, the best eleven players, of the Toppserien.

2020. This year was the best year ever for Vålerenga IF, they won the Norwegian competition, Toppserien, and they also won the Norwegian Women's Cup.

In January 2021, she joined Adelaide United in Australia in the W-League. Adelaide United played their best season ever and ended fifth in the regular competition. They missed the finals by one goal. Maruschka was voted Player of the Year of Adelaide United and received the Alagich Vidmar award.

In May 2021, after the end of the Australian season, Waldus joined Dutch club PSV, signing a two-season contract. However, Adelaide United wanted her back after 1 year and bought out her contract in August 2022. In September 2023, Waldus signed a two-year extension with the club. Despite being signed for the 2024–25 A-League Women season, in May 2024, the club announced Waldus' departure.

In August 2024, Waldus signed a one-year contract with Dutch club Feyenoord.

In May 2025, Waldus announced her retirement.
