= Meleri Mullan =

Australian women's football player

Personal information
- Full name: Meleri Mullan
- Date of birth: 14 June 2000 (age 26)
- Place of birth: Australia
- Position: Forward

Team information
- Current team: Hashtag United
- Number: 18

Senior career*
Years	Team	Apps	(Gls)
2018	FFSA NTC	12	(4)
2018–2019	Adelaide United	1	(0)
2019–2020	Adelaide University	9	(4)
2020	Salisbury Inter	17	(3)
2020–2022	Adelaide United	16	(0)
2024–2025	Adelaide United	10	(0)
2025–	Hashtag United	8	(3)
- * Club domestic league appearances and goals as of 3 March 2026

Meleri Mullan (born 14 June 2000) is an Australian soccer player who plays as a forward for Women's National League South (WNL South) club Hashtag United. She previously played for A-League Women club Adelaide United.

She is known for the local soccer's fastest in the Women's National Premier League 2019 for the FFSA NTC women's team with a speed of 10.04

== Club career ==
=== Adelaide United ===
After playing at the FFSA NTC, Mullan joined W-League club Adelaide United in October 2018. She played her first game with Adelaide United in a 0–0 draw against Melbourne Victory coming on as a substitute for Emily Condon.

=== Adelaide University ===
In March 2019, Mullan left the W-League and joined Adelaide University.

=== Salisbury Inter ===
In March 2020, Mullan joined Salisbury Inter.

=== Return to Adelaide United ===
In December 2020, Mullan returned to Adelaide United after scoring 3 goals in 17 appearances for Salisbury Inter in the 2020 Women's NPL. She made 11 appearances for the club, and after spending the off-season with Bankstown City Lions and Salisbury Inter, she re-signed with the club for the 2021–22 A-League Women season. At the end of the season, Mullan was not retained ahead of the 2022–23 A-League Women season.

In January 2024, following five months not playing due to recovery from a meniscus tear, Mullan re-joined Adelaide United until the end of the 2023–24 A-League Women season. Following Mullan’s 2024 season with West Adelaide, scoring 14 goals in 8 games. Mullan rejoined Adelaide United on a professional contract for season 2024/2025.

In May 2025, the club announced that Mullan is leaving following the conclusion of her contract.
