= Ilona Melegh =

Australian soccer player

Personal information
- Date of birth: 2 July 2008 (age 18)
- Place of birth: Adelaide, South Australia, Australia
- Position: Goalkeeper

Team information
- Current team: Adelaide United
- Number: 1

Youth career
- Cumberland United
- Adelaide University

Senior career*
Years	Team	Apps	(Gls)
2024–	Adelaide United	14	(0)

International career^{‡}
2024–2025	South Australia U16	6	(0)
2025–	Australia U20	9	(0)
2026–	Australia	0	(0)
- * Club domestic league appearances and goals as of 5 June 2026 ‡ National team caps and goals as of 5 June 2026

Ilona Melegh (Hungarian: [ˈilonɒ ˈmɛlɛɡ] EE-loh-naw MEH-leg; born 2 July 2008) is an Australian soccer player and former cricketer who plays as a goalkeeper for A-League Women club Adelaide United and the Australia national team.

== Early life ==
Melegh was born on 2 July 2008 in Adelaide, South Australia. She began playing soccer after watching her older brother Zalán train, stepping in whenever an extra player was needed and eager to play despite coming from a family that was not very sporty. As a junior Melegh played with boys at her brother's club, Cumberland United, before moving to Adelaide University women's team. According to her mother, Helen, observers predicted since school age that she would be "playing for the Matildas one day". She also played cricket and was named in the Australia under-19 national team, before choosing to stick to soccer later on. In 2023 Melegh played senior club soccer for Adelaide University and then Football SA NTC in the following year. As from June 2026 she is in Year 12 at Sports College South Australia in the suburb of Wayville, where she is due to graduate later that year.

== Club career ==
=== Adelaide United ===
Melegh signed for A-League Women club Adelaide United on a scholarship deal ahead of the 2024–25 season. She made her début on 29 March 2025 in a 2–1 loss in the Original Rivalry to Melbourne Victory away at AAMI Park in the suburb of Melbourne, Victoria. This was her only appearance of the season, and she only played due to an injury to then-starting goalkeeper Claudia Jenkins whilst she was warming up.

Ahead of the 2025–26 season, Melegh extended her contract to the end of the 2026–27 season. Mid-season, she eventually became their starting goalkeeper, and was described as one of the league's best breakout stars of the season. Throughout the season, she made 12 appearances and kept five clean sheets. At the end of season awards ceremony (the 2026 Alagić Vidmar Awards Night), she was awarded Adelaide's Women's Rising Star Award.

== State career ==
Whilst playing a grand final for Adelaide University, Melegh was discovered by Football South Australia National Training Centre (Football SA NTC) women's head coach Michele Lastella, who advised her to play as a goalkeeper after telling her she looked and played like one. She then selected her to play for South Australia at the 2024 Emerging Matildas Championships at the Home of the Matildas in the suburb of Bundoora in Melbourne, where she was named Under-16 Goalkeeper of the Tournament.

== International career ==
=== Australia U20 ===
Melegh received her first international call-up when interim head coach Kory Babington called her up for the Australia under-20 national team (Young Matildas) as part of a 26-player squad for the 2025 Pacific Women's Four Nations Tournament in Canberra, Australian Capital Territory (ACT) in February 2025, featuring the senior national teams of the Solomon Islands and Vanuatu as well as the Thailand under-20 national team. She played all three matches of the tournament, which the Young Matildas won.

Melegh was again called up for the under-20 national team, being named as part of head coach Alex Epakis' 23-player squad for the 2026 AFC U-20 Women's Asian Cup in Thailand in April 2025. She played all four of Australia's games, though the Young Matildas were eliminated in the quarter-finals.

Melegh was once again called up by Epakis as part of a 25-player squad for a two-match friendly series against New Zealand at the Australian Institute of Sport (AIS) in Canberra on 20 and 23 May 2026. Both matches ended in draws, drawing 1–1 and 0–0 respectively.

=== Australia ===
Melegh received her first call-up for the Australia senior national team when head coach Joe Montemurro named her in a 24-player squad for a two-match friendly series against Mexico in New South Wales in June 2026, with the first match being held on 6 June at McDonald Jones Stadium in the Newcastle suburb of New Lambton, and the second match being held on 9 June at CommBank Stadium in the Sydney suburb of Parramatta. She described the call-up as something she dreamt of since her early childhood.

== Style of play ==
Melegh is a shot-stopper. She believes the best advice she had received for her career was that "mistakes are just stepping stones on the path to greatness; learn from them and keep moving forward".

== Personal life ==
Melegh's favourite movie is the 1995 American Christmas comedy Home Alone, while her favourite song is "1955" by Australian hip-hop group Hilltop Hoods, featuring Australian musicians Montaigne and Tom Thum. She is able to juggle and play the guitar.
