= 2022–23 in Australian soccer =

54th season of national competitive soccer in Australia

Soccer in Australia
- Season: 2022–23

Men's soccer
- ALM Premiership: Melbourne City
- ALM Championship: Central Coast Mariners
- Australia Cup: Macarthur FC

Women's soccer
- ALW Premiership: Sydney FC
- ALW Championship: Sydney FC

The 2022–23 season was the 54th season of national competitive Soccer in Australia and 140th overall.

== National teams ==
=== Men's senior ===
==== Friendlies ====
The following is a list of friendlies played by the men's senior national team in 2022–23.

22 September 2022	Australia	1–0	New Zealand	Brisbane, Australia
20:00 UTC+10	Mabil 32'	Report		Stadium: Suncorp Stadium; Attendance: 25,392; Referee: Ryuji Sato (Japan)

25 September 2022	New Zealand	0–2	Australia	Auckland, New Zealand
16:00 UTC+12		Report	Duke 54'; Cummings 80' (pen.)	Stadium: Eden Park; Attendance: 34,985; Referee: Yusuke Araki (Japan)

24 March 2023	Australia	3–1	Ecuador	Sydney, Australia
20:00 AEDT	Irvine 12'; Mabil 32'; Kuol 84'	Report	Torres 23'	Stadium: CommBank Stadium; Attendance: 20,668; Referee: Kim Dae-yong (South Korea)

28 March 2023	Australia	1–2	Ecuador	Melbourne, Australia
19:30 AEDT	Borrello 16'	Report	Estupiñán 51' (pen.); Pacho 65'	Stadium: Marvel Stadium; Attendance: 27,103; Referee: Chae Sang-hyeop (South Korea)

15 June 2023	Argentina	2–0	Australia	Beijing, China
20:00 UTC+8	Messi 2'; Pezzella 68'	Report		Stadium: Worker's Stadium; Attendance: 68,000; Referee: Ma Ning (China)

==== FIFA World Cup ====
22 November 2022 Group stage	France	4–1	Australia	Al Wakrah, Qatar
22:00 UTC+3	Rabiot 27'; Giroud 32', 71'; Mbappé 68'	Report	Goodwin 9'	Stadium: Al Janoub Stadium; Attendance: 40,875; Referee: Victor Gomes (South Africa)

26 November 2022 Group stage	Tunisia	0–1	Australia	Al Wakrah, Qatar
13:00 UTC+3		Report	Duke 23'	Stadium: Al Janoub Stadium; Attendance: 41,823; Referee: Daniel Siebert (Germany)

30 November 2022 Group stage	Australia	1–0	Denmark	Al Wakrah, Qatar
18:00 UTC+3	Leckie 60'	Report		Stadium: Al Janoub Stadium; Attendance: 41,232; Referee: Mustapha Ghorbal (Algeria)

3 December 2022 Round of 16	Argentina	2–1	Australia	Al Rayyan, Qatar
22:00 UTC+3	Messi 35'; Álvarez 57'	Report	Fernández 77' (o.g.)	Stadium: Ahmad bin Ali Stadium; Attendance: 45,032; Referee: Szymon Marciniak (Poland)

=== Men's under-23 ===
==== Friendlies ====
24 March 2023	Switzerland U20	1–0	Australia	Bellinzona, Switzerland
19:00 (UTC+1)	Matoshi 3'	Report		Stadium: Stadio Comunale Bellinzona

27 March 2023	Como (Italy)	0–4	Australia	Como, Italy
15:30 (UTC+1)		Report	Botic; Hollman (pen.); Kuol; D'Arrigo	Stadium: Stadio Giuseppe Sinigaglia

==== Maurice Revello Tournament ====
In preparation for the 2024 AFC U-23 Asian Cup qualification, the Olyroos participated in the Maurice Revello Tournament, a youth tournament held in the Bouches-du-Rhône department in southern France. Due to the late withdrawal of the Togo team in early June, the tournament organisers called-up a selection of under-21 players from the Mediterranean region, who participated in the Olyroos group.

6 June 2023 Group stage	Qatar	0–0 (4–3 p)	Australia	Aubagne, France
14:00 (UTC+2)		Report		Stadium: Lattre-de-Tassigny Stadium; Attendance: 350; Referee: Ivana Martinčić (Croatia)
	Penalties
	Al-Rawi (penalty scored); Hamza (penalty scored); Al-Ali (penalty scored); Al-Yazidi (penalty scored)		Botic (penalty scored); Teague (penalty scored); D'Arrigo (penalty scored); Rawlins (penalty missed); Nieuwenhof (penalty missed)

9 June 2023 Group stage	Australia	3–2	U-21 Mediterranean team	Mallemort, France
14:00 (UTC+2)	Velupillay 6', 21'; Teague 85'	Report	Mandefu 26'; Trinker 43'	Stadium: Stade d'Honneur; Attendance: 350; Referee: Tess Olofsson (Sweden)

12 June 2023 Group stage	Mexico	0–2	Australia	Aubagne, France
14:00 (UTC+2)		Report	Botic 50'; Francois 87'	Stadium: Lattre-de-Tassigny Stadium; Attendance: 500; Referee: Karim Abed (France)

16 June 2023 Semi-final	Australia	1–2	Panama	Salon-de-Provence, France
14:30 (UTC+2)	Botic 18'	Report	Contreras 37'; Perdomo 87'	Stadium: Stade d'Honneur Marcel Roustan; Attendance: 250; Referee: Tess Olofsson (Sweden)

18 June 2023 Third place play-off	France	0–2	Australia	Salon-de-Provence, France
14:30 (UTC+2)		Report	Hollman 29'; D'Arrigo 45+3'	Stadium: Stade d'Honneur Marcel Roustan; Attendance: 600; Referee: Ivana Martinčić (Croatia)

=== Men's under-20 ===
==== Costa Cálida Supercup ====
Following the withdrawal from 2023 AFC U-20 Asian Cup qualification, the Young Socceroos participated in the Costa Cálida Supercup, a four nations tournament which took place in Spain.

22 September 2022	Australia	0–1	Morocco	San Pedro del Pinatar, Spain
18:00 CEST		Report	Labib 3'	Stadium: Pinatar Arena

24 September 2022	Australia	1–3	Chile	San Pedro del Pinatar, Spain
21:00 CEST	Badolato 21'	Report	Guajardo 30'; Fuentealba 44', 57'	Stadium: Pinatar Arena

27 September 2022	England	3–0	Australia	San Pedro del Pinatar, Spain
17:00 CEST	Jebbison 32'; Ramsey 38'; Edozie 51'	Report		Stadium: Pinatar Arena

==== FPF Sub-18 International Tournament ====
After missing out on qualification to the 2023 AFC U-20 Asian Cup, the Young Socceroos sent an under-18 squad to contest the FPF Sub-18 International Tournament, a four nations tournament taking place in Portugal.

9 June 2023	Portugal	4–2	Australia	Queluz, Portugal
18:00 WEST	Rêgo 41'; Semedo 45+1', 47', 51'	Report	Jovanovic 9'; Schreiber 76'	Stadium: Sports Complex Real Sport Clube; Referee: Pedro Ramalho (Portugal)

11 June 2023	England	3–2	Australia	Oeiras, Portugal
	Marsh 14', 17'; Blake 90'	Report	Caputo 19'; Younis 45'	Stadium: Cidade do Futebol

13 June 2023	Norway	1–2	Australia	Oeiras, Portugal
	Faraas 43'	Report	Caputo 4'; Middleby 70'	Stadium: Cidade do Futebol

==== AFC U-20 Asian Cup qualification ====
At the end of August, Football Australia withdrew the team from the tournament, citing safety reasons and travel advice. However, they were reinstated when Iraq lost hosting rights due to the 2021–2022 Iraqi political crisis, with the matches rescheduled and relocated to Kuwait City.

14 October 2022 Group stage	Australia	4–1	Kuwait	Kuwait City, Kuwait
19:30 AST	Segecic 24' (pen.); Popovic 32' (pen.), 40'; Triantis 88'	Report	Al-Azmi 52' (pen.)	Stadium: Jaber Al-Ahmad International Stadium; Referee: Nazmi Nasaruddin (Malaysia)

16 October 2022 Group stage	India	1–4	Australia	Kuwait City, Kuwait
16:30 AST	G. Singh 62'	Report	Kuol 12'; Yumnam 32' (o.g.); Segecic 86'; Caputo 90+2'	Stadium: Jaber Al-Ahmad International Stadium; Referee: Ali Reda (Lebanon)

18 October 2022 Group stage	Australia	1–0	Iraq	Kuwait City, Kuwait
16:30 AST	Popovic 59'	Report		Stadium: Jaber Al-Ahmad International Stadium

==== AFC U-20 Asian Cup ====
1 March 2023 Group stage	Australia	0–1	Vietnam	Fergana, Uzbekistan
15:00 UZT		Report	Quốc Việt 6'	Stadium: Istiqlol Stadium; Attendance: 5,715; Referee: Chen Hsin-chuan (Chinese Taipei)

4 March 2023 Group stage	Iran	2–3	Australia	Fergana, Uzbekistan
15:00 UZT	Eslamtalab 25'; Enayatzadeh 80'	Report	Simmons 8'; Segecic 19', 46'	Stadium: Istiqlol Stadium; Attendance: 1,154; Referee: Nazmi Nasaruddin (Malaysia)

7 March 2023 Group stage	Qatar	1–9	Australia	Tashkent, Uzbekistan
15:00 UZT	Asar 2'	Report	Al-Ghareeb 13' (o.g.); Donnell 21'; Borges-Rodrigues 25'; Oliveira 39', 67'; Yull 76'; Popovic 79'; Goodwin 90'; Badolato 90+2'	Stadium: JAR Stadium; Attendance: 123; Referee: Nazmi Nasaruddin (Malaysia)

11 March 2023 Quarter-final	Uzbekistan	1–1 (a.e.t.) (5–4 p)	Australia	Tashkent, Uzbekistan
19:00 UZT	Abdurahmatov 79'	Report	Popovic 77'	Stadium: Milliy Stadium; Referee: Ammar Mahfoodh (Bahrain)
	Penalties
	Fayzullaev (penalty scored); Kholdorkhonov (penalty scored); Abdurazzoqov (penalty scored); Makhamadjonov (penalty scored); Rahmonaliyev (penalty scored)		(penalty scored) Triantis; (penalty scored) Goodwin; (penalty scored) Rawlins; (penalty scored) Badolato; (penalty missed) Segecic

=== Men's under-17 ===
==== Friendlies ====
10 February 2023 2023 Antalya Youth Cup	Australia	0–0	Czech Republic	Antalya, Turkey
15:00 TRT		Report		Stadium: Emir Sport Complex

13 February 2023 2023 Antalya Youth Cup	Australia	2–1	Morocco	Antalya, Turkey
11:00 TRT	Green 44'; Glasson 48' (pen.)	Report	74'	Stadium: Emir Sport Complex

15 February 2023 2023 Antalya Youth Cup	Australia	1–2	Uzbekistan	Antalya, Turkey
15:00 TRT	Hoey 40'	Report	35'; 76'	Stadium: Emir Sport Complex

==== AFF U-16 Youth Championship ====
2 August 2022 Group stage	Australia	2–3	Myanmar	Bantul, Indonesia
15:00	Coveny 39'; Pizio 44'	Report	Saw Myo Zaw 3'; Shine Wanna Aung 23'; Pyae Sone Aung 72'	Stadium: Sultan Agung Stadium; Attendance: 33; Referee: Thoriq Alkatiri (Indonesia)

5 August 2022 Group stage	Cambodia	4–2	Australia	Bantul, Indonesia
15:00	David 1'; Menghong 23', 90+1'; Makara 83'	Report	Gulasi 38' (pen.); Hately 82'	Stadium: Sultan Agung Stadium; Attendance: 26; Referee: Mick Jon Pineda (Philippines)

8 August 2022 Group stage	Malaysia	2–2	Australia	Sleman, Indonesia
15:00	Saharuddin 36', 48'	Report	Gulasi 17'; Hately 65'	Stadium: Maguwoharjo Stadium

==== AFC U-17 Asian Cup qualification ====
5 October 2022 Group stage	Australia	23–0	Northern Mariana Islands	Shepparton, Australia
19:30 AEDT	Irankunda 1', 6', 16', 38', 71'; Hately 28', 44', 48'; Glasson 32', 36', 59', 64'; di Pizio 35' (pen.), 54'; Pearman 43'; Antoniou 53', 63'; Quintal 56', 69'; Parkes 75'; Lebib 77'; Ngewakl 89' (o.g.); Dovison 90+1'	Report		Stadium: Shepparton Sports City; Attendance: 484

7 October 2022 Group stage	Cambodia	0–10	Australia	Shepparton, Australia
19:45 AEDT		Report	Chongmieng 5' (o.g.); Glasson 13'; Hately 36', 73'; Irankunda 49'; Lebib 52'; Quintal 72' (pen.), 81'; Dovison 77'; di Pizio 90'	Stadium: Shepparton Sports City; Referee: Choi Hyun-jae (South Korea)

9 October 2022 Group stage	Australia	3–1	China	Shepparton, Australia
15:00 AEDT	Irankunda 7' (pen.), 65'; di Pizio 70'	Report	Wang Yudong 25'	Stadium: Shepparton Sports City; Referee: Ammar Mahfoodh (Bahrain)

==== AFC U-17 Asian Cup ====
16 June 2023 Group stage	Australia	0–2	Saudi Arabia	Chonburi, Thailand
17:00 (ICT)		Report	Al-Bishri 56'; Al-Jadaani 86'	Stadium: Chonburi Stadium; Referee: Omar Al-Yaqoubi (Oman)

19 June 2023 Group stage	China	3–5	Australia	Chonburi, Thailand
17:00 (ICT)	Wang 14', 62'; Jiwen 45+7'	Report	Irankunda 9', 18'; De Abreu 12'; Glasson 25'; Amanatidis 90+8'	Stadium: Chonburi Stadium; Referee: Ahmed Eisa Darwish (United Arab Emirates)

22 June 2023 Group stage	Tajikistan	0–2	Australia	Bangkok, Thailand
17:00 (ICT)		Report	Bennie 68'; Amanatidis 90+9'	Stadium: Rajamangala Stadium; Referee: Thoriq Munir Alkatiri (Indonesia)

26 June 2023 Quarter-final	Japan	3–1	Australia	Pathum Thani, Thailand
17:00 (ICT)	Nawata 10'; Michiwaki 23'; Takaoka 74'	Report	Irankunda 62'	Stadium: BG Stadium; Referee: Mongkolchai Pechsri (Thailand)

=== Women's senior ===
==== Friendlies ====
The following is a list of friendlies played by the women's senior national team in 2022–23.

3 September 2022	Australia	0–1	Canada	Brisbane, Australia
14:45 UTC+10		Report	Leon 11'	Stadium: Suncorp Stadium; Attendance: 25,016; Referee: Anna-Marie Keighley (New Zealand)

6 September 2022	Australia	1–2	Canada	Sydney, Australia
19:40 UTC+10	Fowler 3'	Report	Leon 48', 64'	Stadium: Sydney Football Stadium; Attendance: 26,997; Referee: Park Se-jin (South Korea)

8 October 2022	Australia	4–1	South Africa	London, United Kingdom
12:30 UTC+0	Vine 5', 24'; Polkinghorne 42'; Foord 53'	Report	Magaia 87'	Stadium: Kingsmeadow; Referee: Lorraine Watson (Scotland)

11 October 2022	Denmark	1–3	Australia	Viborg, Denmark
18:00 CEST (UTC+2)	Holmgaard 1'	Report	Foord 66', 76'; Gorry 74'	Stadium: Viborg Stadion; Referee: Sara Persson (Sweden)

12 November 2022	Australia	4–0	Sweden	Melbourne, Australia
14:45 UTC+11	Kerr 36'; Foord 51', 76'; Fowler 72'	Report		Stadium: AAMI Park; Attendance: 22,065; Referee: Anna-Marie Keighley (New Zealand)

15 November 2022	Australia	2–0	Thailand	Gosford, Australia
19:30 UTC+11	Kerr 40'; Raso 47'	Report		Stadium: Industree Group Stadium; Attendance: 11,271; Referee: Anna-Marie Keighley (New Zealand)

7 April 2023	Australia	0–1	Scotland	London, England
13:45		Report	Docherty 47'	Stadium: Cherry Red Records Stadium; Referee: Louise Thompson (Northern Ireland)

11 April 2023	England	0–2	Australia	London, England
19:45		Report	Kerr 32'; Grant 67'	Stadium: Brentford Community Stadium; Attendance: 14,489; Referee: Natalie Simon (United States)

==== Cup of Nations ====
16 February 2023	Australia	4–0	Czech Republic	Gosford, Australia
19:10	Raso 48', 55'; Kerr 70'; Polkinghorne 84'	Report		Stadium: Industree Group Stadium; Attendance: 7,702; Referee: Asaka Koizumi (Japan)

19 February 2023	Australia	3–2	Spain	Sydney, Australia
18:00	Vine 11'; Polkinghorne 16'; Foord 42'	Report	Carmona 73'; Redondo 90+4'	Stadium: CommBank Stadium; Attendance: 17,333; Referee: Asaka Koizumi (Japan)

22 February 2023	Australia	3–0	Jamaica	Newcastle, Australia
19:10	Gorry 28'; Chidiac 56'; Foord 69'	Source		Stadium: McDonald Jones Stadium; Attendance: 9,093; Referee: Yoshimi Yamashita (Japan)

=== Women's under-23 ===
==== AFF Women's Championship ====
4 July 2022 Group stage	Philippines	1–0	Australia	Manila, Philippines
19:00 UTC+8	Bolden 60'	Report		Stadium: Rizal Memorial Stadium; Attendance: 1,408; Referee: Thein Thein Aye (Myanmar)

6 July 2022 Group stage	Thailand	2–2	Australia	Manila, Philippines
16:00 UTC+8	Kanyanat 41'; Ploychompoo 60'	Report	Sayer 18'; Hawkesby 26' (pen.)	Stadium: Rizal Memorial Stadium; Attendance: 207; Referee: Bùi Thị Thu Trang (Vietnam)

8 July 2022 Group stage	Australia	4–0	Indonesia	Manila, Philippines
16:00 UTC+8	Sayer 9', 13', 15', 44'	Report		Stadium: Rizal Memorial Stadium; Referee: Aung Seinn Cho (Myanmar)

10 July 2022 Group stage	Singapore	1–4	Australia	Manila, Philippines
16:00 UTC+8	Umairah 89'	Report	Heatley 11'; Hunter 16'; Lowry 47'; Gallagher 69'	Stadium: Rizal Memorial Stadium; Referee: Supiree Testhomya (Thailand)

12 July 2022 Group stage	Australia	6–0	Malaysia	Imus, Philippines
19:00 UTC+8	Dawber 13', 24'; Hawkesby 20', 65', 67'; McNamara 82'	Report		Stadium: City of Imus Grandstand; Referee: Công Thị Dung (Vietnam)

=== Women's under-20 ===
==== Friendlies ====
The following is a list of friendlies played by the women's U20 national team in 2022–23.

July 2022	UNAM Pumas (Mexico)	0–1	Australia	Mexico City, Mexico
		Report		Attendance: 0 (Note: Match played behind closed doors.)

26 July 2022	Mexico	3–3	Australia	Mexico City, Mexico
	Maldonado 47'; Marín 74', 85'	Report	Johnson (?); Hunter (?)	Stadium: Centro de Alto Rendimiento; Attendance: 0

5 August 2022	Australia	3–2	Colombia	Costa Rica
	Hunter (?); ? (?); ? (?)	FA report FCF report	Reyes (?); Bonilla (?)	Attendance: 0

8 November 2022 2022 Pacific Women's Four Nations Tournament	Australia	2–1	Solomon Islands	Canberra, Australia
17:00 UTC+11	Prakash 12'; O'Grady 46'	Report	David 44'	Stadium: Australian Institute of Sport

11 November 2022 2022 Pacific Women's Four Nations Tournament	Australia	3–0	Fiji	Canberra, Australia
17:00 UTC+11	Fisher 50'; Saveska 52'; Allan 64'	Report		Stadium: Australian Institute of Sport

13 November 2022 2022 Pacific Women's Four Nations Tournament	Australia	Cancelled	Papua New Guinea	Queanbeyan, Australia
16:00 UTC+11		Cancellation		Stadium: Seiffert Oval

==== FIFA U-20 Women's World Cup ====
Since the qualifying competition for the U-20 Women's World Cup was cancelled, the AFC nominated three teams based on the results of the 2019 AFC U-19 Women's Championship, with Japan, South Korea and North Korea qualifying. After the withdrawal of North Korea, it was announced that Australia would replace North Korea as the AFC’s representatives at the FIFA U-20 Women's World Cup. Australia were drawn into the same group as the hosts, for the official Opening Match of the competition.

10 August 2022 Group stage	Costa Rica	1–3	Australia	San José, Costa Rica
20:00 UTC−6	Pinell 19'	Report	Hunter 37' (pen.); Henry 38'; Fenton 72'	Stadium: Estadio Nacional de Costa Rica; Attendance: 22,506; Referee: Tess Olofsson (Sweden)

13 August 2022 Group stage	Brazil	2–0	Australia	Alajuela, Costa Rica
14:00 UTC−6	Priscila 26'; Aline 46'	Report		Stadium: Estadio Alejandro Morera Soto; Attendance: 1,759; Referee: Cheryl Foster (Wales)

16 August 2022 Group stage	Australia	0–3	Spain	Alajuela, Costa Rica
20:00 UTC−6		Report	Gabarro 19', 24', 61'	Stadium: Estadio Alejandro Morera Soto; Attendance: 939; Referee: Francia González (Mexico)

==== AFC U-20 Women's Asian Cup qualification ====
4 March 2023 First round	Australia	Cancelled	Iraq	Bishkek, Kyrgyzstan
--:-- UTC+6		Source		Stadium: Dolen Omurzakov Stadium

6 March 2023 First round	Guam	0–13	Australia	Bishkek, Kyrgyzstan
20:00 UTC+6		Report	Murray 5', 40'; Hollman 17', 37'; Johnson 28'; Kenney 45' (o.g.); Cicco 63', 70', 90+3'; Dos Santos 65'; Grove 74'; Galic 79'; Murphy 85'	Stadium: Dolen Omurzakov Stadium; Attendance: 10; Referee: Sejin Park (South Korea)

10 March 2023 First round	Kyrgyzstan	0–7	Australia	Bishkek, Kyrgyzstan
20:00 UTC+6		Report	Dos Santos 4'; Murphy 21', 48'; Murray 24', 34'; O'Grady 37'; Briedis 90+7'	Stadium: Dolen Omurzakov Stadium; Attendance: 512; Referee: Sunita Thongthawin (Thailand)

3 June 2023 Second round	Australia	5–0	Lebanon	Việt Trì, Vietnam
17:00 UTC+7	Johnson 10'; Ferris 15'; Dos Santos 80'; Saveska 90'; Cicco 90+3'	Report		Stadium: Việt Trì Stadium; Referee: Yu Hong (China PR)

5 June 2023 Second round	Iran	0–3	Australia	Việt Trì, Vietnam
17:00 UTC+7		Report	Johnson 27', 29'; Lobo 64'	Stadium: Việt Trì Stadium; Referee: Pansa Chaisant (Thailand)

7 June 2023 Second round	Vietnam	0–2	Australia	Việt Trì, Vietnam
20:00 UTC+7		Report	Murphy 50', 56'	Stadium: Việt Trì Stadium; Referee: Yang Shu-ting (Chinese Taipei)

=== Women's under-17 ===
==== Friendlies ====
The following is a list of friendlies played by the women's U17 national team in 2022–23.

30 October 2022	Australia	1–3	South Korea U-15	Kingscliff, Australia
16:00 AEDT	Kuilamu 21'	Report	Phiar 5', 81'; Won 56'	Stadium: Walter Peate Oval

2 November 2022	Australia	1–1	South Korea U-15	Burleigh Heads, Australia
19:00 AEST	Dos Santos 31'	Report	Jeon 38'	Stadium: Pizzey Park

4 November 2022	Australia	0–1	South Korea U-15	Burleigh Heads, Australia
19:00 AEST		Report	39' (o.g.)	Stadium: Pizzey Park

6 June 2023	South Korea	1–1	Australia	Paju, South Korea
15:00 KST		Report		Stadium: National Football Center

9 June 2023	South Korea	1–3	Australia	Paju, South Korea
10:30 KST		Report		Stadium: National Football Center

==== AFF Women's U-18 Championship ====
25 July 2022 Group stage	Australia	4–0	Philippines	Palembang, Indonesia
15:30 UTC+7	Prakash 26', 62'; Beier 59'; Lobo 69'	Report		Stadium: Jakabaring Athletic Field; Referee: Keomany Phengmeuangkhon (Laos)

27 July 2022 Group stage	Malaysia	0–8	Australia	Palembang, Indonesia
19:30 UTC+7		Report	Fisher 18'; O'Grady 37', 44'; Accardo 45'; Brown 77', 90'; Saveska 89'; Massih 90+2'	Stadium: Jakabaring Athletic Field; Referee: Sunita Thongthawin (Thailand)

29 July 2022 Group stage	Australia	2–1	Myanmar	Palembang, Indonesia
15:30 UTC+7	Brown 3'; O'Grady 65'	Report	Zin Moe Pyae 23'	Stadium: Jakabaring Athletic Field

2 August 2022 Semi-final	Australia	1–0 (a.e.t.)	Thailand	Palembang, Indonesia
20:00 UTC+7	O'Grady 109'	Report		Stadium: Gelora Sriwijaya Stadium

4 August 2022 Final	Vietnam	0–2	Australia	Palembang, Indonesia
20:00 UTC+7		Report	Saveska 39'; Stanic-Floody 52'	Stadium: Gelora Sriwijaya Stadium; Referee: Supiree Testomya (Thailand)

==== AFC U-17 Women's Asian Cup qualification ====
22 April 2023 Round 1	Australia	Cancelled	Bhutan	Ulaanbaatar, Mongolia
--:-- UTC+8		Withdrawal		Stadium: MFF Football Centre

24 April 2023 Round 1	Mongolia	0–11	Australia	Ulaanbaatar, Mongolia
15:00 UTC+8		Report	Groidis 1'; Kuilamu 19'; Younis 24'; Meyers 45+1', 87'; McMahon 45+3'; Fuller 49', 69', 82', 90+4'; Kiceec 89'	Stadium: MFF Football Centre; Referee: Supiree Testhomya (Thailand)

28 April 2023 Round 1	Australia	3–0	Chinese Taipei	Ulaanbaatar, Mongolia
15:00 UTC+8	Brooking 26'; Williams 58' (pen.); Dale 90+3'	Report		Stadium: MFF Football Centre; Referee: Asaka Koizumi (Japan)

== Domestic leagues ==
=== A-League Men ===
Pos	Team	Pld	W	D	L	GF	GA	GD	Pts	Qualification
1	Melbourne City	26	16	7	3	61	32	+29	55	Qualification for AFC Champions League group stage and Finals series (Note: Determined by which of the Premiers for the 2021–22 or 2022–23 seasons accrued the most combined points over both seasons.)
2	Central Coast Mariners (C)	26	13	5	8	55	35	+20	44	Qualification for AFC Cup group stage and Finals series
3	Adelaide United	26	11	9	6	53	46	+7	42	Qualification for Finals series (Note: The top two teams enter the finals series at the semi-finals, while the teams ranked third to sixth enter the finals series at the elimination-finals.)
4	Western Sydney Wanderers	26	11	8	7	43	27	+16	41	Qualification for Finals series
5	Sydney FC	26	11	5	10	40	39	+1	38	Qualification for Finals series
6	Wellington Phoenix (Note: Wellington Phoenix cannot qualify for Asian Football Confederation competitions as they are based in New Zealand, which is under the Oceania Football Confederation.)	26	9	8	9	39	45	−6	35	Qualification for Finals series
7	Western United	26	9	5	12	34	47	−13	32	
8	Brisbane Roar	26	7	9	10	26	33	−7	30	
9	Perth Glory	26	7	8	11	36	46	−10	29	Qualification for 2023 Australia Cup play-offs
10	Newcastle Jets	26	8	5	13	30	45	−15	29	Qualification for 2023 Australia Cup play-offs
11	Melbourne Victory	26	8	4	14	29	34	−5	28	Qualification for 2023 Australia Cup play-offs
12	Macarthur FC	26	7	5	14	31	48	−17	26	Qualification for AFC Cup group stage and 2023 Australia Cup play-offs (Note: Qualified to the AFC Cup as the 2022 Australia Cup winners.)

Source: A-Leagues
Rules for classification: 1) Points; 2) Goal difference; 3) Goals scored; 4) Points per game; 5) Least red cards; 6) Least yellow cards; 7) Toss of a coin in an event of a tie of two clubs.
(C) Champions

==== Finals series ====
Elimination-finals
4	Western Sydney Wanderers	1
5	Sydney FC	2
3	Adelaide United	2
6	Wellington Phoenix	0

Semi-finals
5	Sydney FC	1	0	1
1	Melbourne City	1	4	5
3	Adelaide United	1	0	1
2	Central Coast Mariners	2	2	4

Grand Final
1	Melbourne City	1
2	Central Coast Mariners	6

=== National Premier Leagues ===
There was no finals series for the third year in a row.

=== A-League Women ===
Sydney FC won the regular season for the third consecutive time.

Pos	Team	Pld	W	D	L	GF	GA	GD	Pts	Qualification
1	Sydney FC (C)	18	13	1	4	43	15	+28	40	Qualification to Finals series and 2023 AFC Women's Club Championship
2	Western United (Note: The APL awarded Western United a 3–0 win as a result of Brisbane Roar fielding an ineligible player, after the round 17 match had originally finished 2–0 for Brisbane.)	18	13	0	5	38	20	+18	39	Qualification to Finals series
3	Melbourne City	18	9	3	6	36	23	+13	30	Qualification to Finals series
4	Melbourne Victory	18	7	8	3	29	22	+7	29	Qualification to Finals series
5	Canberra United	18	8	5	5	35	30	+5	29	
6	Perth Glory	18	8	4	6	31	26	+5	28	
7	Western Sydney Wanderers	18	5	4	9	16	23	−7	19	
8	Adelaide United	18	5	3	10	16	29	−13	18	
9	Brisbane Roar	18	4	6	8	16	31	−15	18	
10	Newcastle Jets	18	4	2	12	22	53	−31	14	
11	Wellington Phoenix	18	3	4	11	20	30	−10	13	

Source: A-Leagues
Rules for classification: 1) points; 2) goal difference; 3) number of goals scored.
(C) Champions
Notes:

Finals series

Semi-finals
1	Sydney FC	0
2	Western United	1
3	Melbourne City	3 (1)
4	Melbourne Victory (p)	3 (4)

Preliminary final
1	Sydney FC	1
4	Melbourne Victory	0

Grand final
2	Western United	0
1	Sydney FC	4

Ref:

== Domestic cups ==
=== Australia Cup ===
Round of 32
Peninsula Power	4
NWS Spirit	1
Wollongong United	2
Green Gully	3
Sydney United 58	3
Monaro Panthers	0
Western United	2
Melbourne Victory	1
Adelaide City	1
Logan Lightning	0
Newcastle Jets	0
Adelaide United	2
Mindil Aces	0
Avondale FC	6
Heidelberg United	1
Brisbane Roar	3
Bonnyrigg White Eagles	0
Oakleigh Cannons	5
Brisbane City	3
Cockburn City	1
Bentleigh Greens (a.e.t.)	2
Broadmeadow Magic	1
Sydney FC (p)	3 (3)
Central Coast Mariners	3 (1)
Armadale SC	2
Modbury Jets	5
Magpies Crusaders United	0
Macarthur FC	6
Newcastle Olympic	0
Melbourne City	1
Devonport City	0
Wellington Phoenix	4

Round of 16
Peninsula Power	2
Green Gully	1
Sydney United 58 (p)	1 (4)
Western United	1 (3)
Adelaide City	2 (1)
Adelaide United (p)	2 (4)
Avondale FC	2 (1)
Brisbane Roar (p)	2 (4)
Oakleigh Cannons (a.e.t.)	5
Brisbane City	3
Bentleigh Greens	1
Sydney FC	2
Modbury Jets	0
Macarthur FC	4
Melbourne City	1
Wellington Phoenix	2

Quarter-finals
Peninsula Power	0
Sydney United 58	1
Adelaide United	1
Brisbane Roar	2
Oakleigh Cannons	2
Sydney FC	1
Macarthur FC	2
Wellington Phoenix	0

Semi-finals
Sydney United 58 (a.e.t.)	3
Brisbane Roar	2
Oakleigh Cannons	2
Macarthur FC	5

Final
Sydney United 58	0
Macarthur FC	2

==== Final ====
1 October 2022
19:45 AEST

Sydney United 58 (2)	0–2	Macarthur FC (1)
	Report	Toure 32' (pen.); Dávila 90' (pen.)

CommBank Stadium, Sydney
Attendance: 16,641
Referee: Daniel Elder

== Deaths ==
- 25 July 2022: Karen Harris, Australia, Elizabeth Downs, Campbelltown City, Renegades, and Modbury Vista full-back.
- 21 August 2022: Peter Stone, 67, Australia, Western Suburbs, APIA Leichhardt, and St George midfielder.
- 21 October 2022: Masato Kudo, 32, Japan and Brisbane Roar striker.
- 10 November 2022: John Roche, 75, Australia, Sutherland Shire, and Marconi Fairfield defender.
- 28 February 2023: Grant Turner, 64, New Zealand and South Melbourne striker.
- 28 March 2023: Manfred Schaefer, 80, Australia, Blacktown, and St. George-Budapest Club defender.
- 8 June 2023: Rale Rasic, 87, Footscray JUST player, and coach of Australia, Footscray JUST, Melbourne Hungaria, St George, Marconi Stallions, Pan Hellenic, Adelaide City, Blacktown City, South Melbourne, APIA Leichhardt, Canterbury-Marrickville, Rockdale Ilinden, Fairfield Bulls, and Canberra Cosmos.

== Retirements ==
- 19 July 2022: Tommy Oar, 30, former Australia, Brisbane Roar, Central Coast Mariners, and Macarthur midfielder.
- 20 July 2022: James Meredith, 34, former Australia, Perth Glory, and Macarthur defender.
- 3 October 2022: Matt Simon, 36, former Australia, Central Coast Mariners, and Sydney FC forward.
- 19 October 2022: Ola Toivonen, 36, former Sweden and Melbourne Victory forward.
- 10 January 2023: Yusuke Tanaka, 36, former Western Sydney Wanderers defender.
- 23 January 2023: Jem Karacan, 33, former Central Coast Mariners midfielder.
- 2 February 2023: Matthew Spiranovic, 34, former Australia, North Geelong Warriors, Melbourne Victory, Western Sydney Wanderers, and Perth Glory defender.
- 4 February 2023: Mitchell Mallia, 30, former Central Coast Mariners, Marconi Stallions, Sydney FC, Blacktown City, and Perth Glory midfielder.
- 15 March 2023: Carly Telford, 35, former England and Perth Glory goalkeeper.
- 29 March 2023: Liam Reddy, 41, former Parramatta Power, Sydney United, Newcastle Jets, Brisbane Roar, Wellington Phoenix, Sydney FC, Central Coast Mariners, Western Sydney Wanderers, and Perth Glory goalkeeper.
- 1 April 2023: Kim Carroll, 35, former Australia, Queensland Sting, Brisbane Roar, and Perth Glory defender.
- 1 April 2023: Tara Andrews, 29, former Australia and Newcastle Jets forward.
- 1 April 2023: Claire Coelho, 26, former Newcastle Jets and Sydney FC goalkeeper.
- 1 April 2023: Teigen Allen, 29, former Australia, Sydney FC, Western Sydney Wanderers, Melbourne City, Melbourne Victory, and Newcastle Jets defender.
- 2 April 2023: Ellie Brush, 34, former Australia, Canberra United, Western Sydney Wanderers, and Sydney FC defender.
- 5 April 2023: Jessie Rasschaert, 35, former Canberra United and Brisbane Roar defender.
- 29 April 2023: Nikolai Topor-Stanley, 38, former Australia, Belconnen United, Manly United, Sydney FC, Perth Glory, Newcastle Jets, Western Sydney Wanderers, and Western United defender.
- 29 April 2023: Alessandro Diamanti, 39, former Italy and Western United midfielder.
- 11 May 2023: Robbie Kruse, former Australia, Brisbane Roar, and Melbourne Victory forward.
- 19 May 2023: Siem de Jong, 34, former Netherlands and Sydney FC forward.
- 24 May 2023: Dimas Delgado, 40, former Western Sydney Wanderers midfielder.
- 24 May 2023: Brad Jones, 41, former Australia and Perth Glory goalkeeper.
- 26 May 2023: Anna Green, 32, former New Zealand, Adelaide United, and Sydney FC defender
- 1 June 2023: Alex Wilkinson, 38, former Australia, Northern Spirit, Manly United, Central Coast Mariners, Melbourne City, and Sydney FC defender.
- 1 June 2023: Hannah Brewer, 30, former Australia, Newcastle Jets, Melbourne Victory, Melbourne City, and Canberra United defender.
- 1 June 2023: Laura Brock, 33, former Australia, Melbourne Victory, Brisbane Roar, and Melbourne City defender.
- 3 June 2023: Scott Jamieson, 34, former Australia, Adelaide United, Sydney FC, Perth Glory, Western Sydney Wanderers, and Melbourne City defender.
- 14 June 2023: Rhys Williams, 34, former Australia, Perth Glory, Melbourne Victory, and Western Sydney Wanderers defender.
- 30 June 2023: Aaron Mooy, 32, former Australia, Western Sydney Wanderers, and Melbourne City midfielder.
