= Bairiki National Stadium =

Sports stadium in Bairiki, Kiribati

National Reuben K. Uatioa Stadium
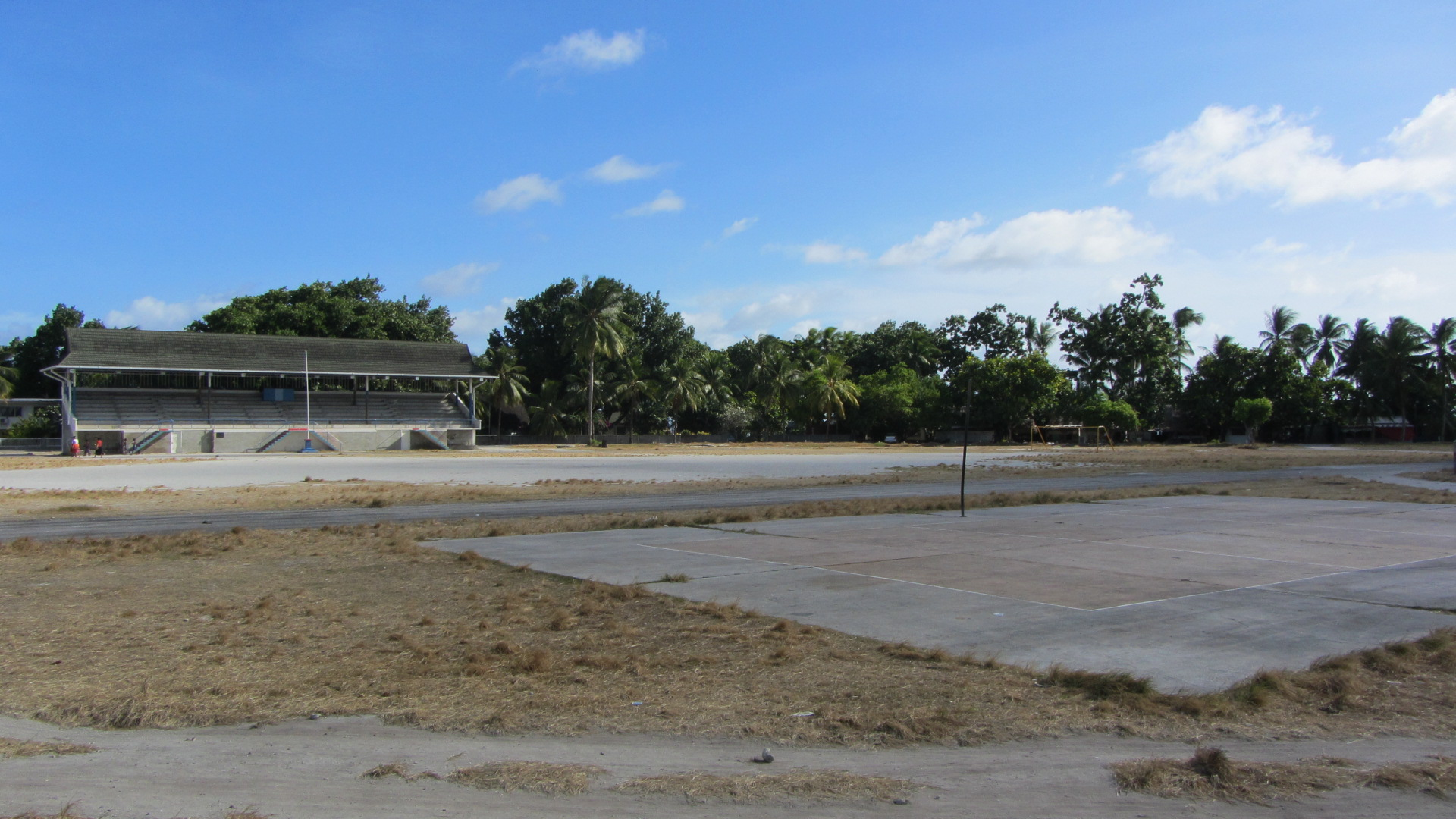
- Bairiki National Stadium (2011)
- Interactive map of National Reuben K. Uatioa Stadium
- Location: Bairiki, South Tarawa, Kiribati
- Coordinates: 1°19′45″N 172°58′37″E
- Owner: Kiribati Islands Football Association
- Capacity: 2,500

The Bairiki National Stadium is located in Bairiki, Kiribati. It is the national stadium and the home of Kiribati's men's and women's national football teams. The official name of the stadium is Reuben K. Uatioa Stadium. The stadium's capacity is around 2,500.

== Football ==
The Bairiki National Stadium is the home of the Kiribati national football teams. It has never been used for an international match as Kiribati have never played an international football match at home. The sand surface in the stadium is also a factor that has stopped Kiribati becoming an official FIFA member for the time being. Some football matches at the Bairiki National Stadium took place in front of capacity crowds of 2,500.

== See also ==
- Kiribati National Championship
- KIFF Pro League
- Football in Kiribati
