= Football in Kiribati =

- Country: Kiribati
- National team: Men's national team

Club competitions
- OFC Men's Champions League (proposed)

International competitions
- OFC Men's Nations Cup (proposed); Pacific Games

The sport of football in the country of Kiribati is run by the Kiribati Islands Football Federation. It is the most popular sport in Kiribati, likely originating with their previous British rule. It has been played on the islands since 1979 at the latest, with their participation in the 1979 Pacific Games. The association administers the national men's football team and national women's football team. For national football league there was the Kiribati National Championship, with evidence as early as 1984 for the men and 2002 for the women. In 2021, there was an additional Tarawa Champions League, won by SB Lyke It. Since 2026, the KIFF Pro League became the main national league.

== Football stadiums in Kiribati ==
Stadium	Capacity	City
Bairiki National Stadium	2,500	Bairiki
