= 2025 Pacific Women's Four Nations Tournament =

2025 PacificAus Sports Four Nations
Tournament details
- Host country: Australia
- City: Canberra
- Dates: 19–25 February
- Teams: 4 (from 2 confederations)
- Venue: 2 (in 1 host city)

Final positions
- Champions: Australia
- Runners-up: Thailand
- Third place: Vanuatu

Tournament statistics
- Matches played: 6
- Goals scored: 45 (7.5 per match)

The 2025 PacificAus Sports Four Nations was an invitational four-team women's association football tournament hosted by Football Australia. The tournament was held in Canberra, Australia It took place from 19 to 25 February 2025.

The tournament was supported by the Australian Government, through the PacificAus Sports program, and builds on foundations set during the 2022 edition, with the expansion bringing together the Oceania Football Confederation and the Asian Football Confederation through women's football for the first time since successfully co-hosting the FIFA Women's World Cup 2023.

Each team played the other once, in a round robin format.

== Participating nations ==
Four teams entered the Pacific Women's Four Nations Main tournament.

Team	Appearance	Previous best performance
Australia U20	2nd	Winners (2022)
Vanuatu	1st	Debut
Thailand U20	1st	Debut
Solomon Islands	2nd	Runners-up (2022)

== Venues ==
Canberra	2025 Pacific Women's Four Nations Tournament (Australia)
Viking Park	2025 Pacific Women's Four Nations Tournament (Australia)
Capacity: 7,000	2025 Pacific Women's Four Nations Tournament (Australia)

Canberra	2025 Pacific Women's Four Nations Tournament (Australia)
Deakin Stadium	2025 Pacific Women's Four Nations Tournament (Australia)
Capacity: 1,500	2025 Pacific Women's Four Nations Tournament (Australia)

== Officials ==
=== Referees ===
- (Australia) Casey Reibelt
- (Australia) Mikayla Ryan
- (Australia) Rebecca Durcau
- (Australia) Caitlin Williams
- (Australia) Molly Godsell
- (Australia) Georgia Ghirardello

=== Assistant Referees ===
- (Australia) Maddy Allum
- (Australia) Emma Kozbek
- (Australia) Maggie Price
- (Australia) Delfina Shakespeare
- (Papua New Guinea) Stephanie Minan
- (Samoa) Maria Salamasina
- (Tonga) Lata Kaumatule

=== Fourth Officials ===
- (Australia) Bec Mackie
- (Australia) Kelly Jones
- (Australia) Isabella Mossin

== Squads ==
=== Tournament table ===
Pos	Team	Pld	W	D	L	GF	GA	GD	Pts	Final result
1	Australia U20 (H)	3	3	0	0	26	2	+24	9	Champions
2	Thailand U20	3	2	0	1	18	5	+13	6	Runners-up
3	Vanuatu	3	1	0	2	1	17	−16	3	
4	Solomon Islands	3	0	0	3	0	21	−21	0	

Updated to match(es) played on unknown. Source:
Rules for classification: Tiebreakers
(H) Hosts
19 February 2025
15:00

Australia U20	9–0	Vanuatu
Saveska 13', 17'; Allan 34'; Kuilamu 30'; Caspers 44'; Breier 50'; Lobo 63'; Stanic-Floody 72', 90+4'	Report

Viking Park, Canberra
19 February 2025
18:30

Thailand U20	8–0	Solomon Islands
Klinklai 7'; Limpawanich 20', 38'; Moondong 34', 62'; Cheunarom 40'; Taobao 56'; Thaprik 79'	Report

Viking Park, Canberra

22 February 2025
15:00

Vanuatu	0–8	Thailand U20
	Report	Moondong 14', 19', 28'; Limpawanich 8', 31'; Casteen 64'; Jaimulwong 66'; Kaewanta 89'

Viking Park, Canberra
22 February 2025
18:30

Australia U20	12–0	Solomon Islands
McMahon 9', 23'; Trimis 27', 38', 48', 64'; Collins 50', 68'; Tallon-Henniker 54', 90+1'; Lobo 77'; Saveska 89'	Report

Viking Park, Canberra

25 February 2025
15:00

Solomon Islands	0–1	Vanuatu
	Report	Erikan 30'

Deakin Stadium, Canberra
25 February 2025
18:30

Australia U20	5–2	Thailand U20
Saveska 11', 28', 78'; ? 70' (o.g.); Tallon-Henniker 90+8'	Report	Casteen 19', 35'

Deakin Stadium, Canberra

== Goalscorers ==
There were 45 goals scored in 6 matches, for an average of 7.5 goals per match (as of 25 February 2025).

6 goals

- (Australia) Sienna Saveska

5 goals

- (Thailand) Rinyaphat Moondong

4 goals

- (Australia) Peta Trimis
- (Thailand) Kurisara Limpawanich

3 goals

- (Australia) Caley Tallon-Henniker
- (Thailand) Madison Casteen

2 goals

- (Australia) Maya Lobo
- (Australia) Shelby McMahon
- (Australia) Alexis Collins
- (Australia) Mary Stanic-Floody

1 goal

- (Australia) Madeleine Caspers
- (Australia) Josie Allan
- (Australia) Grace Kuilamu
- (Australia) India Breier
- (Thailand) Thanchanok Cheunarom
- (Thailand) Pinyaphat Klinklai
- (Thailand) Rasita Taobao
- (Thailand) Matika Thaprik
- (Thailand) Julaiporn Jaimulwong
- (Thailand) Natcha Kaewanta
- (Vanuatu) Limas Erikan
- (Thailand) Own goal

== Awards ==
Pacific Player of the Tournament
(Vanuatu national football team) Jane Alatoa
