= Football at the 2003 South Pacific Games – Women's tournament =

Football at the XII Pacific Games – Women
Tournament details
- Host country: Fiji
- Dates: 30 June – 10 July
- Teams: 7

Final positions
- Champions: Papua New Guinea (1st title)
- Runners-up: Guam
- Third place: Tonga
- Fourth place: Tahiti

Tournament statistics
- Matches played: 21
- Goals scored: 81 (3.86 per match)
- Top scorer: (Vanuatu) Lavinia Taga (11 goals)

The 2003 Pacific Games women's football tournament was the inaugural edition of Pacific Games women's football tournament. The competition was held in Fiji from 30 June to 10 July 2003.

== Group stage ==
Pos	Team	Pld	W	D	L	GF	GA	GD	Pts	Qualification
1	Papua New Guinea	6	4	1	1	22	6	+16	13	Gold Medal
2	Guam	6	3	2	1	8	2	+6	11	Silver Medal
3	Tonga	6	3	2	1	10	7	+3	11	Bronze Medal
4	Tahiti	6	3	1	2	11	8	+3	10	
5	Fiji (H)	6	3	1	2	11	8	+3	10	
6	Vanuatu	6	1	1	4	17	12	+5	4	
7	Kiribati	6	0	0	6	2	38	−36	0	

Source: Pacific Games
(H) Hosts
30 June 2003
09:00

Tonga	3–2	Vanuatu
Misinale 41', 46'; Moala 47'		Kalsakau 12'; Taga 34'

Vodafone Ratu Cakobau Park Nausori, Fiji
Referee: Tammy Ogston (Australia)
30 June 2003
11:00

Kiribati	0–13	Papua New Guinea
		Siniu 12', 15', 44', 48', 71', 88'; Aka 14'; Lanta 17', 19'; Alau 61', 89'; Kig 68'; Apeh 79'

Vodafone Ratu Cakobau Park Nausori, Fiji
Referee: Andrew Moli (Solomon Islands)
30 June 2003
13:00

Guam	1–0	Fiji
Thomson 35'

Vodafone Ratu Cakobau Park Nausori, Fiji
Referee: Gidas Bayung (Papua New Guinea)

2 July 2003
16:00

Tonga	0–0	Guam

National Stadium Suva, Fiji
Attendance: 700
Referee: Leone Rakaroi (Fiji)
2 July 2003
18:00

Vanuatu	0–3	Tahiti
		Marmouyet 33'; Taiarui 47'; Samin 65'

National Stadium Suva, Fiji
Attendance: 700
Referee: Tammy Ogston (Australia)
2 July 2003
20:00

Fiji	1–2	Papua New Guinea
Adireki 30'		Siniu 2'; Aka 15'

National Stadium Suva, Fiji
Attendance: 1000
Referee: Harry Attison (Vanuatu)

4 July 2003
09:00

Fiji	2–0	Kiribati
Regu 18'; Vanua 77'

Vodafone Ratu Cakobau Park Nausori, Fiji
Attendance: 600+
Referee: Andrew Moli (Solomon Islands)
4 July 2003
11:00

Tonga	3–1	Papua New Guinea
Misinale 29'; Moala 43'; Moimoi 79'		Apeh 84'

Vodafone Ratu Cakobau Park Nausori, Fiji
Attendance: 700
4 July 2003
15:00

Guam	1–1	Tahiti
Presnell 29'		Marmouyet 41' (pen.)

Vodafone Ratu Cakobau Park Nausori, Fiji
Attendance: 800
Referee: Rajendra Singh (Fiji)

5 July 2003
09:00

Kiribati	0–5	Guam
		Camacho 1', 11'; T. Hannah 6'; A. Hannah 47'; Young 87'

Cathedral Park, Suva, Fiji
Attendance: 500
Referee: Leone Rakaroi (Fiji)
5 July 2003
11:00

Papua New Guinea	2–2	Vanuatu
Barnabas 3'; Apeh (~30)		Taga (~30)

Cathedral Park, Suva, Fiji
Attendance: 600
Referee: Jim Wright (New Caledonia)
5 July 2003
13:00

Tahiti	1–0	Tonga
Marmouyet 83'

Cathedral Park, Suva, Fiji
Attendance: 700+
Referee: Tammy Ogston (Australia)

7 July 2003
09:00

Guam	1–0	Vanuatu
Camacho 8'

Vodafone Ratu Cakobau Park Nausori, Fiji
Attendance: 700+
Referee: Leone Rakaroi (Fiji)
7 July 2003
11:00

Tonga	2–1	Kiribati
Moimoi 24'; Moala 70'		Teuea 48'

Vodafone Ratu Cakobau Park Nausori, Fiji
Attendance: 700+
Referee: Andrew Moli (Solomon Islands)
7 July 2003
13:00

Fiji	3–1	Tahiti
Regu 31', 67'; Ratu 39'		Marmouyet 30'

Vodafone Ratu Cakobau Park Nausori, Fiji
Attendance: 1000
Referee: Jim Wright (New Caledonia)

9 July 2003
09:00

Papua New Guinea	1–0	Guam
Siniu 69'

Vodafone Ratu Cakobau Park Nausori, Fiji
Attendance: 700
Referee: Jim Wright (New Caledonia)
9 July 2003
11:00

Kiribati	1–5	Tahiti
Teuea 10'		Marmouyet 5', 82'; Samin 26', 50', 62'

Vodafone Ratu Cakobau Park Nausori, Fiji
Attendance: 600+
Referee: Leone Rakaroi (Fiji)
9 July 2003
?

Fiji	3–2	Vanuatu
Adireki 36' 79'; Regu 49'		Taga 5'; Maleb 21'

Vodafone Ratu Cakobau Park Nausori, Fiji
Attendance: 1000
Referee: Andrew Moli (Solomon Islands)

10 July 2003
09:00

Fiji	2–2	Tonga
Ratu 17'; Lockington 38'		Patai 44'; Longopoa 73'

Vodafone Ratu Cakobau Park Nausori, Fiji
Attendance: 1000
Referee: Jim Wright (New Caledonia)
10 July 2003
11:00

Kiribati	0–11	Vanuatu
		Kalsakau 2', 28'; Taga 11', 35', 46', 51', 62', 68', 79'; Thomson 60', 89'

Vodafone Ratu Cakobau Park Nausori, Fiji
Attendance: 800+
Referee: Andrew Moli (Solomon Islands)
10 July 2003
13:00

Papua New Guinea	3–0	Tahiti
Banabas 12', 38', 49'

Vodafone Ratu Cakobau Park Nausori, Fiji
Attendance: 1000+
Referee: Leone Rakaroi (Fiji)

2003 South Pacific Games winners

Papua New Guinea
First title

== See also ==
- Pacific Games
