= Mary Stanić-Floody =

Serbian Australian soccer player (born 2006)

Personal information
- Date of birth: 3 January 2006 (age 20)
- Position: Midfielder

Team information
- Current team: Motherwell

Youth career
- Football NSW Institute
- NWS Spirit

Senior career*
Years	Team	Apps	(Gls)
2021–2023	Sydney FC	14	(0)
2023–2026	Canberra United	57	(8)
2026–	Motherwell	0	(0)

International career^{‡}
2021–2023	Australia U17		
2023–2025	Australia U20	1	(2)
2025–	Serbia	0	(0)
- * Club domestic league appearances and goals as of 28 August 2026 ‡ National team caps and goals as of 9 January 2026

Mary Stanić-Floody (/ˈstɑːnɪtʃ flʌdi/ STAH-nich FLUH-dee; Serbian Cyrillic: Мери Станић-Флуди, pronounced [ˈsta.nitɕ]; born 3 January 2006) is a footballer who plays as a midfielder for Scottish Women's Premier League club Motherwell. Born in Australia, she plays for the Serbia national team, having previously represented Australia as an under-17 and under-20 youth international. She previously played for A-League Women clubs Sydney FC and Canberra United.

== Early life ==
Stanić-Floody was born on 3 January 2006 to an Irish father (former boxing champion Antonio Floody) and a Serbian mother. She grew up speaking English as her first language. Her knowledge of Serbian has improved but remains relatively limited, with her noting in particular that she is unable to pronounce the alveolar trill (commonly known as the "rolled R" sound).

Due to her move to Canberra United, Stanić-Floody completed her Higher School Certificate (HSC) in Canberra.

== Club career ==
=== Sydney FC ===
Stanić-Floody signed for Sydney FC in the A-League Women ahead of the 2021–22 season. She made her debut for the club aged 15 on 11 December 2021 in a Derby match against Western Sydney Wanderers, coming on as a substitute. Sydney FC won the premiership that season.

Stanić-Floody remained at the club during the 2022–23 season, in which Sydney FC won both the premiership and the championship, defeating Western United. Post-season, she was released from her contract, after having made a total of 14 appearances.

=== Canberra United ===
Ahead of the 2023–24 season and following her release by Sydney FC, Stanić-Floody signed for Canberra United on a one-year contract. She made her debut for the club in the club's opening match of the season on 15 October 2023, starting in a 4–4 draw away to Adelaide United at Hindmarsh Stadium in Hindmarsh. On 10 December 2023, Stanić-Floody scored her first ever A-League Women goal in a 5–1 home win over Brisbane Roar at McKellar Park in McKellar.

In her second season with Canberra, she scored four goals. She also was nominated for the A-League Women Young Footballer of the Year award.

Stanić-Floody extended her contract with Canberra United for the 2025–26 season.

=== Motherwell ===
In August 2026, Stanić-Floody joined Scottish club Motherwell.

== International career ==
Stanić-Floody is eligible to represent either Australia, the Republic of Ireland or Serbia at an international level under FIFA eligibility rules.

=== Australia ===
Stanić-Floody represented the Australia under-17 national team at the 2022 AFF U-18 Women's Championship in Palembang, Indonesia. She scored the winning goal in the final (which Australia won 2–0) against Vietnam at Gelora Sriwijaya Stadium on 4 August 2022.

Stanić-Floody represented the Australia under-20 national team at the 2025 Pacific Women's Four Nations Tournament in Canberra. She scored a brace in the opening match, a 9–0 win over the Vanuatu senior national team at Viking Park in Wanniassa.

=== Serbia ===
Stanić-Floody had been in contact with the Serbian Football Association upon signing for Canberra United in 2023, though was ineligible to be called up due to an ankle injury. Two years later in 2025, she officially made the decision to represent the Serbia national team, a decision she said was "tough" but ultimately "did what was best for [her] career", and described it as an "honour" to represent her heritage.

She received her first call-up for a friendly against Slovenia in Radomlje on 27 October 2025, but was an unused substitute. Her former Canberra United teammate Vesna Milivojević, who she said made the transition "very easy" and "smooth", especially with her then-limited knowledge of the Serbian language.
