= 2022 Pacific Women's Four Nations Tournament =

2022 PacificAus Women's Four Nations
Tournament details
- Host country: Australia
- City: Canberra
- Dates: 8–13 November
- Teams: 4 (from 2 confederations)
- Venue(s): 2 (in 2 host cities)

Final positions
- Champions: Australia U20 (1st title)
- Runners-up: Solomon Islands
- Third place: Fiji

Tournament statistics
- Matches played: 5
- Goals scored: 13 (2.6 per match)

The 2022 PacificAus Women's Four Nations is an invitational four-team women's association football tournament hosted by the Australian Football Federation. The tournament was held in Canberra, Australia It took place from 8 to 13 November 2022.

== Participating nations ==
Four teams entered the Pacific Women's Four Nations Main tournament (including 2022 OFC Women's Nations Cup top three Nations).

Australia U-20 entered the tournament as a preparations for their 2024 AFC U-20 Women's Asian Cup qualification campaign.

Team	Appearance	Previous best performance
Australia U20	1st	Debut
Fiji	1st	Debut
Papua New Guinea	1st	Debut
Solomon Islands	1st	Debut

== Venues ==
All matches played in the Australian Institute of Sport's Stadium.

Canberra	2022 Pacific Women's Four Nations Tournament (Australia)
Australian Institute of Sport	2022 Pacific Women's Four Nations Tournament (Australia)
Capacity: 25,000	2022 Pacific Women's Four Nations Tournament (Australia)

== Officials ==
=== Referees ===
- (Australia) Georgia Ghirardello

=== Assistant Referees ===
- (Australia) Maddy Allum
- (Australia) Anastasia Filacouridis

== Main tournament ==
The official match schedule was confirmed by Football Australia on 5 November 2022.

Tiebreakers

Ranking in each group shall be determined as follows:

1. Greater number of points obtained in all the group matches;
2. Goal difference in all the group matches;
3. Greater number of goals scored in all the group matches;
4. Greater disciplinary points.

If two or more teams are equal on the basis on the above four criteria, the place shall be determined as follows:

1. Result of the direct match between the teams concerned;
2. Penalty shoot-out if only the teams are tied, and they met in the last round of the group;
3. Drawing lots by the Organising Committee.

All times listed are Australian Eastern Daylight Time (UTC+11:00)

=== Tournament table ===
Pos	Team	Pld	W	D	L	GF	GA	GD	Pts	Final result
1	Australia U20 (H)	2	2	0	0	5	1	+4	6	Champions
2	Solomon Islands	3	1	1	1	5	3	+2	4	Runners-up
3	Fiji	3	1	1	1	3	4	−1	4	
4	Papua New Guinea	2	0	0	2	0	5	−5	0	Withdrew

Updated to match(es) played on 8 November 2022. Source:
Rules for classification: Tiebreakers
(H) Hosts
8 November 2022
10:00

Papua New Guinea	0–2	Fiji
	Report	Nasau 30'; Tamanitoakula 84'

Australian Institute of Sport, Canberra
Referee: Georgia Ghirardello (Australia)
8 November 2022
17:00

Australia U20	2–1	Solomon Islands
Prakash 12'; O'Grady 46'	Report	David 44'

Australian Institute of Sport, Canberra

11 November 2022
10:00

Solomon Islands	3–0	Papua New Guinea
David 4', 10'; Pegi 88'

Australian Institute of Sport, Canberra
11 November 2022
17:00

Australia U20	3–0	Fiji
Fisher 49'; Saveska 51'; Allan 64'

Australian Institute of Sport, Canberra

13 November 2022
10:00

Fiji	1–1	Solomon Islands
Tamanitoakula 38'		Arakau 56'

Seiffert Oval, Queanbeyan
13 November 2022
16:00

Australia U20	Cancelled	Papua New Guinea

Australian Institute of Sport, Canberra

13 November 2022
16:00

Australia U20 Gold	4–0	Australia U20 Green

Seiffert Oval, Queanbeyan

== Goalscorers ==
There were 13 goals scored in 5 matches, for an average of 2.6 goals per match (as of 8 November 2022).

3 goals

- (Solomon Islands) Jemina David

2 goals

- (Fiji) Luisa Tamanitoakula

1 goal

- (Australia) Avaani Prakash
- (Australia) Ella O'Grady
- (Australia) Jonti Fisher
- (Australia) Sienna Saveska
- (Australia) Josie Allan
- (Fiji) Cema Nasau
- (Solomon Islands) Ileen Pegi
- (Solomon Islands) Madeline Arakau

== Awards ==
Player of the Tournament
(Fiji national football team) Cema Nasau

== See also ==
- 2022 OFC Women's Nations Cup
