= 2025–26 Adelaide United FC (women) season =

17th season in existence of Adelaide United FC (women)

Adelaide United FC (women)
2025–26 season
- Head Coach: Theo Tsiounis
- Stadium: Coopers Stadium; Marden Sports Complex
- A-League Women: 5th
- A-League Women Finals: Elimination-final
- Top goalscorer: League: Erin Healy (4); All: Erin Healy (4)
Home colours	Away colours
- All statistics correct as of 18 July 2025.

The 2025–26 season was Adelaide United Football Club (women)'s 18th season in the A-League Women.

== Players ==
=== Squad information ===
Note: Flags indicate national team as defined under FIFA eligibility rules; some limited exceptions apply. Players may hold more than one non-FIFA nationality.

No.	Pos.	Nation	Player
2	DF	AUS	Emily Hodgson
3	DF	AUS	Matilda McNamara
4	DF	AUS	Holly Murray
5	MF	AUS	Sarah Morgan
6	MF	AUS	Melissa Taranto
7	FW	AUS	Emilia Makris
8	MF	AUS	Emily Condon
9	MF	AUS	Paige Zois
10	FW	AUS	Chelsie Dawber
11	FW	AUS	Isabel Hodgson (captain)
12	FW	AUS	Carina Rossi
13	DF	AUS	Ella Tonkin
14	MF	AUS	Maeve Nicholas (amateur)

No.	Pos.	Nation	Player
15	MF	AUS	Adriana Taranto
16	MF	AUS	Dylan Holmes (vice-captain)
17	DF	AUS	Zoe Tolland
18	GK	AUS	Amelie Millar
19	FW	AUS	Katie Bowler
21	GK	NZL	Claudia Jenkins
22	FW	IRL	Erin Healy
25	FW	AUS	Lara Gooch
27	MF	AUS	Sian Dewey
28	FW	AUS	Gracen Blieschke (amateur)
30	GK	AUS	Ilona Melegh
99	GK	AUS	Mia Trimboli (youth development)

== Transfers ==
=== Transfers in ===
No.	Position	Player	From	Type/fee	Contract length	Date	Ref
4	DF	Holly Murray	Unattached	Free transfer	1 year (Note: Option for an additional year.)	2 September 2025	
25	FW	Lara Gooch	Unattached	Free transfer	2 years	17 September 2025	
7	FW	Emilia Makris	Unattached	Free transfer	3 years	19 September 2025	
6	MF	Melissa Taranto	Unattached	Free transfer	1 year	24 September 2025	
15	MF	Adriana Taranto	Unattached	Free transfer	1 year	24 September 2025	
9	MF	Paige Zois	Unattached	Free transfer	3 years	26 September 2025	
12	FW	Carina Rossi	(Australia) Box Hill United	Free transfer	1 year	10 October 2025	
18	GK	Amelie Millar	(Australia) Launceston City	Free transfer	1 year	10 October 2025	
14	MF	Maeve Nicholas	(Australia) West Torrens Birkalla	Amateur contract	1 year	14 November 2025	
28	FW	Gracen Blieschke	(Australia) FSA NTC	Amateur contract	1 year	14 November 2025	
99	GK	Mia Trimboli	(Australia) FSA NTC	Youth development agreement	1 year	14 November 2025	

=== Transfers out ===
No.	Position	Player	Transferred to	Type/fee	Date	Ref
24	DF	Abby Middleton	(Australia) Adelaide Comets	End of contract	20 May 2025	
3	FW	Meleri Mullan	Unattached	End of contract	25 May 2025	
7	FW	(England) Abby Clarke	Unattached	End of contract	25 May 2025	
28	FW	Chrissy Panagaris	Unattached	End of contract	25 May 2025	
18	MF	Lara Kirkby	(Germany) VfL Bochum	End of contract	27 May 2025	
6	MF	Tiana Karambasis	Unattached	End of contract	9 June 2025	
14	DF	(Dominican Republic) Lucía León	Wellington Phoenix	End of contract	9 June 2025	
12	MF	(Japan) Nanako Sasaki	Unattached	Mutual contract termination	26 August 2025	
1	GK	Annalee Grove	Unattached	Mutual contract termination	9 September 2025	
20	MF	Miley Grigg	(Australia) North Eastern MetroStars	End of contract	20 October 2025	
23	FW	(England) Fiona Worts	(South Korea) Incheon Hyundai Steel Red Angels	Undisclosed	19 March 2026	

=== Contract extensions ===
No.	Player	Position	Duration	Date	Notes
22	(Republic of Ireland) Erin Healy	Forward	1 year	27 May 2025	Extension triggered
8	Emily Condon	Midfielder	1 year	27 May 2025	Extension triggered
13	Ella Tonkin	Defender	1 year	27 May 2025	Extension triggered
2	Emily Hodgson	Defender	3 years	28 August 2025	
3	Matilda McNamara	Defender	2 years	28 August 2025	
5	Sarah Morgan	Midfielder	1 year	28 August 2025	
10	Chelsie Dawber	Forward	2 years	28 August 2025	
21	(New Zealand) Claudia Jenkins	Goalkeeper	2 years	28 August 2025	Option for an additional year
23	(England) Fiona Worts	Forward	2 years	28 August 2025	
27	Sian Dewey	Midfielder	2 years	28 August 2025	
30	Ilona Melegh	Goalkeeper	2 years	28 August 2025	Option for an additional year

== Pre-season and friendlies ==
20 September 2025	WNPLSA All-Stars (Australia)	1–2	(Australia) Adelaide United	Adelaide, Australia
14:00 ACST	Rojas	Report	Makris; Condon	Stadium: ServiceFM Stadium

16 October 2025	Melbourne City (Australia)	0–1	(Australia) Adelaide United	Melbourne, Australia
		Report	Blieschke 50'	Stadium: The Home of the Matildas; Attendance: 0 (behind closed doors)
Note: Played across two 40-minute halves

18 October 2025	Melbourne Victory (Australia)	1–1	(Australia) Adelaide United	Melbourne, Australia
	Lowe (?)	Report	Holmes (?)	Stadium: The Home of the Matildas

== Competitions ==
=== Overall record ===
Competition	First match	Last match	Final position	Record							
Competition	First match	Last match	Final position	Pld	W	D	L	GF	GA	GD	Win %
A-League Women	2 November 2025	3 April 2026	5th	20	9	3	8	24	26	−2	45.00
A-League Women Finals	25 April 2026	25 April 2026	Elimination-final	1	0	0	1	0	3	−3	0.00
Total				21	9	3	9	24	29	−5	42.86

Last updated: 25 April 2026
Source: Competitions

=== A-League Women ===
==== League table ====
Pos	Team	Pld	W	D	L	GF	GA	GD	Pts	Qualification
3	Canberra United	20	9	4	7	30	24	+6	31	Qualification for Finals series
4	Brisbane Roar	20	9	4	7	37	39	−2	31	Qualification for Finals series
5	Adelaide United	20	9	3	8	24	26	−2	30	Qualification for Finals series
6	Melbourne Victory	20	8	4	8	27	24	+3	28	Qualification for Finals series
7	Central Coast Mariners	20	7	7	6	27	26	+1	28	

Source: A-Leagues
Rules for classification: 1) points; 2) goal difference; 3) goals scored; 4) wins; 5) head-to-head results; 5a) head-to-head points; 5b) head-to-head goal difference; 6) Fair Play points; 7) away goal difference; 8) away goals per match; 9) home goal difference; 10) home goals per match; 11) toss of a coin in an event of a tie of two clubs.

==== Matches ====
Win Draw Loss

2 November 2025 1	Central Coast Mariners	3–0	Adelaide United	Gosford
16:15 AEDT	Trimis 39'; Dos Santos 41'; Gomez 79'	Report		Stadium: polytec Stadium; Attendance: 1,720; Referee: Abbie Hendry

8 November 2025 2	Adelaide United	0–0	Sydney FC	Adelaide
15:30 ACDT		Report		Stadium: ServiceFM Stadium; Attendance: 694; Referee: Isabella Mossin

14 November 2025 3	Adelaide United	2–1	Canberra United	Adelaide
18:30 ACDT	Condon 24'; McNamara 78'	Report	De Domizio 1'	Stadium: ServiceFM Stadium; Attendance: 737; Referee: Bec Mackie

7 December 2025 6	Adelaide United	1–3	Brisbane Roar	Adelaide
16:20 ACDT	Healy 51'	Report	Kuilamu 29'; Jansen 49', 67'	Stadium: Coopers Stadium; Attendance: 4,004; Referee: Caitlin Williams

13 December 2025 7	Melbourne Victory	1–0	Adelaide United	Melbourne
16:50	Lowe 50'	Report		Stadium: AAMI Park; Attendance: 2,004; Referee: Isabella Mossin

21 December 2025 8	Perth Glory	1–0	Adelaide United	Perth
17:00	Badawiya 39'	Report		Stadium: Sam Kerr Football Centre; Attendance: 825; Referee: Sophie Allum

27 December 2025 9	Adelaide United	5–2	Western Sydney	Adelaide
16:20 ACDT	E. Hodgson 22'; Zois 35'; Healy 49', 86'; Dawber 68'	Report	Ng-Saad 48'; Berryhill 75'	Stadium: Coopers Stadium; Attendance: 5,781; Referee: Izzy Cooper

4 January 2026 11	Adelaide United	1–0	Central Coast Mariners	Adelaide
16:20 ACDT	Condon 47'	Report		Stadium: Coopers Stadium; Attendance: 4,667; Referee: Izzy Cooper

9 January 2026 12	Sydney FC	0–0	Adelaide United	Sydney
19:00 AEDT		Report		Stadium: Leichhardt Oval; Attendance: 1,857; Referee: Lara Lee

17 January 2026 13	Adelaide United	2–1	Melbourne Victory	Adelaide
16:50	Worts 38'; Zois 56'	Report	White 48'	Stadium: Coopers Stadium; Attendance: 6,477; Referee: Isabella Mossin

21 January 2026 10	Newcastle Jets	1–2	Adelaide United	Newcastle
21:00 AEDT	Davis 27'	Report	Healy 60'; Rossi 73'	Stadium: No.2 Sportsground; Attendance: 1,130; Referee: Mikayla Ryan

25 January 2026 14	Wellington Phoenix	3–1	Adelaide United	Porirua
16:00 NZDT	Woods 15'; Nunn 18', 86'	Report	I. Hodgson 87'	Stadium: Porirua Park; Attendance: 1,070; Referee: Sarah Jones

31 January 2026 15	Adelaide United	2–1	Melbourne City	Adelaide
16:00 ACDT	Worts 9'; Tonkin 49'	Report	McKenna 65'	Stadium: Coopers Stadium; Attendance: 654; Referee: Tom Brinkworth
Note: Due to forecasted heat, the match was postponed from its original date 30 January 2026.

8 February 2026 16	Western Sydney	0–1	Adelaide United	Sydney
19:00 AEDT		Report	Matos 59' (o.g.)	Stadium: CommBank Stadium; Attendance: 683; Referee: Rachael Mitchenson

22 February 2026 18	Brisbane Roar	0–2	Adelaide United	Brisbane
17:00 AEST		Report	E. Hodgson 11'; Tonkin 78'	Stadium: Spencer Park; Attendance: 668; Referee: Sophie Allum

13 March 2026 19	Adelaide United	2–1	Perth Glory	Adelaide
18:30	Worts 31'; Morgan 56'	Report	Badawiya 11'	Stadium: Coopers Stadium; Attendance: 1,527; Referee: Mikayla Ryan

18 March 2026 4	Melbourne City	0–0	Adelaide United	Melbourne
16:30 AEDT		Report		Stadium: ctrl:cyber Pitch; Attendance: 651; Referee: Caitlin Williams
Note: Due to an outbreak of influenza A within the Adelaide United squad, the match was postponed from its original date 17 December 2025.

22 March 2026 20	Canberra United	3–2	Adelaide United	Canberra
14:00 AEDT	Gordon 10'; McNamara 69' (o.g.); Hawkins 77'	Report	Morgan 27'; Dewey 90+1'	Stadium: McKellar Park; Attendance: 1,066; Referee: Isabella Mossin

28 March 2026 21	Adelaide United	1–3	Newcastle Jets	Adelaide
15:15 ACDT	I. Hodgson 41'	Report	Brown 23', 83'; J. Allan 55'	Stadium: ServiceFM Stadium; Attendance: 571; Referee: Georgia Ghirardello

3 April 2026 22	Adelaide United	0–2	Wellington Phoenix	Adelaide
16:20		Report	Van der Meer 30'; Nunn 34'	Stadium: Coopers Stadium; Attendance: 5,124; Referee: Georgia Ghirardello

==== Finals series ====
25 April 2026 Elimination-final	Brisbane Roar	3–0	Adelaide United	Brisbane
17:00 AEST	Stephenson 51', 57'; Medwin 83'	Report		Stadium: Imperial Corp Stadium; Attendance: 3,500; Referee: Lara Lee

== Statistics ==
=== Appearances and goals ===
Includes all competitions. Players with no appearances not included in the list.

As of match played 25 April 2026

No.	Pos	Nat	Player	Total		A-League Women		A-League Women Finals	
No.	Pos	Nat	Player	Apps	Goals	Apps	Goals	Apps	Goals
2	DF	(Australia) AUS	Emily Hodgson	20	2	17+2	2	1	0
3	DF	(Australia) AUS	Matilda McNamara	19	1	18	1	1	0
4	DF	(Australia) AUS	Holly Murray	8	0	4+4	0	0	0
5	MF	(Australia) AUS	Sarah Morgan	15	2	9+5	2	1	0
6	MF	(Australia) AUS	Melissa Taranto	19	0	17+1	0	1	0
7	FW	(Australia) AUS	Emilia Makris	10	0	1+8	0	0+1	0
8	MF	(Australia) AUS	Emily Condon	20	2	17+2	2	1	0
9	MF	(Australia) AUS	Paige Zois	15	2	8+7	2	0	0
10	FW	(Australia) AUS	Chelsie Dawber	20	1	13+6	1	1	0
11	FW	(Australia) AUS	Isabel Hodgson	18	2	10+7	2	0+1	0
12	FW	(Australia) AUS	Carina Rossi	12	1	2+10	1	0	0
13	DF	(Australia) AUS	Ella Tonkin	21	2	20	2	1	0
14	MF	(Australia) AUS	Maeve Nicholas	2	0	0+2	0	0	0
15	MF	(Australia) AUS	Adriana Taranto	20	0	16+3	0	1	0
16	MF	(Australia) AUS	Dylan Holmes	12	0	5+6	0	0+1	0
17	DF	(Australia) AUS	Zoe Tolland	17	0	16	0	1	0
19	FW	(Australia) AUS	Katie Bowler	4	0	0+3	0	0+1	0
21	GK	(New Zealand) NZL	Claudia Jenkins	8	0	8	0	0	0
22	FW	(Republic of Ireland) IRL	Erin Healy	19	4	16+2	4	1	0
25	FW	(Australia) AUS	Lara Gooch	9	0	2+6	0	0+1	0
27	MF	(Australia) AUS	Sian Dewey	3	1	1+2	1	0	0
30	GK	(Australia) AUS	Ilona Melegh	13	0	12	0	1	0
Player(s) transferred out but featured this season
23	FW	(England) ENG	Fiona Worts	13	3	8+5	3	0	0

=== Clean sheets ===
Includes all competitions. The list is sorted by squad number when total clean sheets are equal. Numbers in parentheses represent games where both goalkeepers participated and both kept a clean sheet; the number in parentheses is awarded to the goalkeeper who was substituted on, whilst a full clean sheet is awarded to the goalkeeper who was on the field at the start of play. Goalkeepers with no clean sheets not included in the list.

As of match played 25 April 2026

Rank	No.	Nat.	Goalkeeper	A-League Women	A-League Women Finals	Total
1	30	(Australia)	Ilona Melegh	5	0	5
2	21	(New Zealand)	Claudia Jenkins	1	0	1
Total				6	0	6

== See also ==
- 2025–26 Adelaide United FC season
