= Kiribati National Championship =

- Founded: 1984
- Country: Kiribati
- Confederation: OFC
- Number of clubs: 16
- Level on pyramid: 1
- Current champions: Betio Town Council (2023)
- Most championships: Betio Town Council (6)

The Kiribati National Championship was the top division of competitive football in the nation of Kiribati, founded in 1984 by the Kiribati Islands Football Association, the nations football governing body. The association and the National Championships are based in the capital city, South Tarawa.

The competition has reunited only temporary council teams (one council team on each island, two teams on Tabiteuea and three on Tarawa) and is disputed during Te Runga, the National Games held every two years. Previously, the competition consisted of 23 teams divided into four groups. Most recently, the league is divided into the Kiribati National Championship and the Second Kiribati League, with overall 16 teams competing.

== Final teams (2023) ==
- Banaba
- Betio FC
- Betio Town Council
- Butaritari
- Christmas FC
- Kuria
- Maiana FC
- Makin FC
- Marakei F.C.
- Nikunau
- Nonouti FC
- North Tarawa Island Terunga
- Onotoa Islands FC
- Poland F.C.
- Tarawa Urban Council F.C.
- Temana Team FC

== Previous winners ==
Previous winners are:

Season	Winner	Result	Runners-up	Venue
1984	South Tarawa	3–1	Abaiang	Unknown
1985–1986: not known (possibly not held)
1987	Makin	1–0	Abemama	Unknown
1988–1994: not known (many years: not held)
1995	Betio Town Council	2–1	Marakei	Bairiki National Stadium
1996	Tarawa Urban Council	5–1	Banaba	Bairiki National Stadium
1997	Tarawa Urban Council	4–3	Christmas	Bairiki National Stadium
1998: not held
1999	Betio Town Council	3–0	Kuria	Bairiki National Stadium
2000	Onotoa	1–0	North Tarawa Island Terunga	Bairiki National Stadium
2001: not held
2002	Arorae	3–2	Nikunau	Bairiki National Stadium
2003: not held
2004	Tarawa Urban Council	2–1	Betio Town Council	Bairiki National Stadium
2005: not held
2006	Betio Town Council	3–1	Tarawa Urban Council	Bairiki National Stadium
2007–2008: not held
2009	Betio Town Council	2–1	Temana Team	Bairiki National Stadium
2010	Makin	1–1 (a.e.t.), (4–1 p)	Marakei	Bairiki National Stadium
2011–2012: not held
2013	Makin	4–0	Butaritari	Bairiki National Stadium
2014	Christmas	2–1	Nonouti	Bairiki National Stadium
2015–2016: not held
2017	Nonouti	2–0	Aranuka	Bairiki National Stadium
2018: not held
2019	Betio Town Council	3–2	Tarawa Urban Council	Bairiki National Stadium
2020–2022: not held
2023	Betio Town Council	3–2	Tarawa Urban Council	Bairiki National Stadium

=== By titles ===
Team	Wins	Winning years
Betio Town Council	6	1995, 1999, 2006, 2009, 2019, 2023
Makin	3	1987, 2010, 2013
Tarawa Urban Council	3	1996, 1997, 2004
South Tarawa	1	1987
Onotoa	1	2000
Arorae	1	2002
Christmas	1	2014
Nonouti	1	2017

== See also ==
- KIFF Pro League
