= Kiribati Islands Football Association =

Governing body of football in Kiribati

OFC
- Short name: KIFF
- Founded: 1980; 46 years ago
- Headquarters: South Tarawa
- FIFA affiliation: N/A
- OFC affiliation: 2007 (associate member)
- President: Eriati Reebo
- Website: https://www.kiri.football/

The Kiribati Islands Football Association, formerly the Kiribati Islands Football Federation, is the governing body of football in Kiribati, established in 1980. It organises the nation's football league, the KIFF Pro League, as well as controlling national men's, women's and futsal teams.

KIFF President Eriati Reebo attended the 76th FIFA Congress in May 2026, marking the first time Kiribati was represented at the event. Reebo met with FIFA president Gianni Infantino to discuss the association's desire to become a full member of both the OFC and FIFA. By that meeting, the KIFF had already submitted its application, with a vote set to be on the agenda for the confederation's congress scheduled for 18 March 2027 in Morocco.

== Staff ==
Position	Name
President	Guillermo Landos-Sanchez
Vice president	Spencer Wewner-Sharp
General secretary	Tenea Atera
Assistant secretary	Kaotitaake Rakoroa
Treasurer	Navahine Pine
Assistant treasurer	Aren Tebau
Coaches' chairman	Pine Iosefa
Referees' chairman	Kautotoki Matia

== Tournaments ==
- KIFF Pro League - the top division of the domestic league
- Kiribati National Championship - former top division of the domestic league

== See also ==
- Football in Kiribati
