= Margaret Aka =

Soccer player and coach

Personal information
- Date of birth: 1976 (age 49–50)
- Place of birth: Guhi, Kimbe, West New Britain Province, Papua New Guinea
- Position: Striker

Senior career*
Years	Team	Apps	(Gls)
1996–2006	Telikom Football Club		
2006–2008	Gap Football Club		
2011	Bizprints Angels		

International career
1998–2007	Papua New Guinea		
- * Club domestic league appearances and goals

Margaret Aka (born 1976) is a soccer player and coach from Papua New Guinea. She is the first woman in Papua New Guinea — and the first in the world outside of New Zealand — to receive an Oceania Football Confederation (OFC) B License in coaching. The first woman in Papua New Guinea to coach a male league team, she is also only the third to do so worldwide.

== Early years ==
Aka is from the village of Guhi, in Kimbe, West New Britain Province. Growing up, Aka heard stories from her father about playing soccer. She did not play soccer as a child, however, as it was widely considered a sport for boys. She discovered the game for herself in 1991 at Kimbe High School. She then received an offer to study at Sogeri National High School, a boarding school for grades 11 and 12, and play on their team in the 1992 Women's Division 2 of the Port Moresby Soccer Association competition, where they won the grand final

== League play ==
Aka built a career as a striker. Aka began the 1996 season with Telikom Football Club. Playing with them until 2006, she helped the team win seven grand finals in the Port Moresby Soccer Association competition, and nine club championships. From 2006-2008 Aka played in Brisbane, Australia, with Gap Football Club in the Brisbane Women's Premier League, through AUSAID. When Papua New Guinea's Women's National Soccer League (WNSL) launched in early 2011, Aka was back, playing for the Bizprints Angels

== International play ==
In 1998, Aka played striker on the PNG national team in the OFC Cup in New Zealand. She represented PNG on the national in the 2003 and 2007 South Pacific Games, as well. In each, she contributed to the PNG Women's team winning a gold medal.

== Player development work ==
Aka's playing career came to an end in 2011, when she required an operation. She shifted her focus to development of interest in soccer among the youth of Papua New Guinea. In 2014, the Oceania Football Confederation (OFC) in cooperation with the Papua New Guinea Football Association put Aka in charge of the "Just Play" program in PNG. The Just Play program strives for gender equality, encouraging everyone to play soccer.

Similarly, FIFA's Live Your Goals initiative, launched globally in 2011 to strengthen girls' and women's opportunities and interests in soccer, came to PNG in 2016. Aka served as the coordinator for this "legacy program," which was intended to help maintain momentum in women's soccer after PNG hosted the 2016 Women's World Cup.

By January 2017, Aka had taken the role of PNGFA women's football development officer. She is still in that position as of 2020.

== Coaching career ==
Frederica Sakette, a past PNGFA women's football development officer, recruited Aka as a volunteer coach in 2013. She got the opportunity to coach the national U-15 girls' team when they won the spot to represent Oceania in the 2014 Youth Olympic Games in Nanjing, China. So, too, did Aka coach the Papua New Guinea U-17 women's team for the OFC U-17 Women's Championship in 2016. They won the silver medal.

PNG's national women's team maintains a high ranking in international competitions, and Aka is often involved in some level of coaching. In 2015, she helped the team prepare for Olympic trials. In November, 2018, Aka assistant coached the national team for the OFC Women's Nations Cup, where they won the bronze medal. In 2019 she assisted mentor Frederica Sakette who was coaching the women's team for the Pacific Games, at which the team won their fourth consecutive gold medal.

The Erima Flyover, PMSA Division 2, was the first men's team Aka coached. They made it to the grand final. That achievement led to her coaching position with the all male Southern Strikers in 2018. FIFA noted that coaching the Southern Strikers makes Aka the third female to coach a male league team, just behind Chan Yuen Ting of Hong Kong and Corinne Diacre or France.

=== OFC B Licence ===
Also in 2014, Aka and male colleague Harrison Kamake began the process of training to earn their B Licenses, through which they became accredited coaches—the first Papua New Guineans to earn an OFC coaching license. Notably, Aka was the first woman from any country other than New Zealand to earn this distinction. Aka noted that the support she got from national and international soccer organizations made it possible for her to complete the accreditation process.

== Awards ==
The Westpac Outstanding Women Award recognized Aka for her achievements in soccer, in particular her coaching and her contribution to community life in PNG, with the Moore Printing Sports Award in 2019.
