= Alex Epakis =

Australian soccer manager

Personal information
- Date of birth: 14 March 1991 (age 35)

Youth career
- Years: Team
- Sydney University
- University of NSW

Managerial career
- Sydney FC Youth (Assistant coach)
- 2017–2018: Canberra United (Assistant coach)
- 2018–2020: Sydney University
- 2020–2024: Perth Glory (Women)
- 2025–: Australia U-20 Women

Alexander Epakis (Greek: Αλεξάντερ Επάκης, pronounced [eˈpakis]) is an Australian soccer manager who currently is currently the head coach of the Australia under-20 women's national team.

== Early life ==
Epakis started playing football at the age of thirteen.

== Playing career ==
Epakis played soccer in the National Premier Leagues NSW.

== Managerial career ==
Epakis has been the youngest Australian manager to obtain a FFA A Licence. He also holds a Masters of Coaching degree. Epakis started his managerial career with Australian second-tier side Sydney University, helping them win the league. Previously, he worked as a youth manager. After that, he was appointed manager of Australian top flight side Perth Glory's women's team.

Epakis joined the coaching staff for the Philippines women's national football team during their 2023 FIFA Women's World Cup campaign, serving as a scout and analyst working under Alen Stajcic.

In August 2023, the Perth Glory confirmed that Epakis' contract would be extended a further two seasons until 2025.

In June 2024, the club announced Epakis' departure for personal reasons.

Epakis was announced as the head coach of the Young Matildas on 10 March 2025, alongside his role as Technical Adviser for Football NSW Girl’s Youth Development.

== Personal life ==
Epakis is of Greek descent.
