= Kiribati women's national football team =

Women's national association football team representing Kiribati

Kiribati
- Association: Kiribati Islands Football Association
- Confederation: ConIFA
- Most caps: Maritaake Kiatoa; Ieriama Berenato; Katiria Nonouri; Kabwebwe Terakubo; Susan Jimmy; Bwatiata Tekautu; Moaniti Teuea; Tabwena Maeri (6 each)
- Top scorer: Moaniti Teuea (2)
- Home stadium: Bairiki National Stadium
- FIFA code: KIR

First international
- Kiribati 0–13 Papua New Guinea (Nausori, Fiji; 30 June 2003)

Biggest win
- None

Biggest defeat
- Kiribati 0–13 Papua New Guinea (Nausori, Fiji; 30 June 2003)

The Kiribati women's national football team is the women's national football team of Kiribati and is controlled by the Kiribati Islands Football Association. Kiribati is not a member of FIFA or of the Oceania Football Confederation (OFC), and is therefore not eligible to enter the FIFA Women's World Cup. Kiribati is a member of ConIFA, though there have been no women's tournaments to date for the side to participate in.

== Background ==
Kiribati have played six international matches up to July 2019 where they scored 2 goals and conceded 38 in the Football at the 2003 South Pacific Games – Women's tournament. Kiribati's first match took place in Nausori, Fiji on 30 June 2003 when they played Papua New Guinea, losing 13–0 in a South Pacific Games match. The side have never won a match but came very close when they lost 2–1 to Tonga on 7 July 2003 also in the South Pacific Games in Fiji. Kiribati's only two goals in the 2003 Pacific games were scored by Moaniti Teuea versus Tonga in the 48th minute. and versus Tahiti in the 10th minute.

On 6 May 2016, Kiribati was formally accepted as the newest member of ConIFA (Confederation of Independent Football Associations), becoming the first ever Oceanic member to join the federation. As of July 2019, Kiribati's women's team have played no games under ConIFA.

== Results and fixtures ==
Legend

Win Draw Lose Void or postponed Fixture

=== 2003 ===
Date	Opponents	Score	Competition	Attendance
30 June 2003	Papua New Guinea	0–13	South Pacific Games	Unknown
4 July 2003	Fiji	0–2	South Pacific Games	600+
5 July 2003	Guam	0–5	South Pacific Games	500+
7 July 2003	Tonga	1–2	South Pacific Games	700+
9 July 2003	Tahiti	1–5	South Pacific Games	600+
10 July 2003	Vanuatu	0–11	South Pacific Games	800+

== South Pacific / Pacific Games record ==
=== Brief Record ===
- 2003 – Round 1
- 2007 to 2019 – Did not enter

=== Performances ===
==== 2003 ====
Group One
Pos	Team	Pld	W	D	L	GF	GA	GD	Pts
1	Papua New Guinea	6	4	1	1	22	6	+16	13
2	Guam	6	3	2	1	8	2	+6	11
3	Tonga	6	3	2	1	10	7	+3	11
4	Tahiti	6	3	1	2	11	8	+3	10
5	Fiji	6	3	1	2	11	8	+3	10
6	Vanuatu	6	1	1	4	17	12	+5	4
7	Kiribati	6	0	0	6	2	38	−36	0

== Current squad ==
Squad selected for the 2003 Pacific Games.

No.	Pos.	Player	Date of birth (age)	Caps	Goals	Club
1	GK	Bwenata Atanrika		1	0	
20	GK	Tabwena Maeri		6	0	
2		Maritaake Kiatoa		6	0	
3		Ieriama Berenato		6	0	
4		Katiria Nonouri		6	0	
5		Kabwebwe Terakubo		6	0	
6		Susan Jimmy		6	0	
7		Kiante Taake Teiti		5	0	
8		Akee Tawita		5	0	
9		Bwatiata Tekautu		6	0	
10		Moaniti Teuea		6	2	
11		Taibo Baua		5	0	
12		Tararaoi Kiaua		4	0	
13		Tokabeti Kaotintoun		1	0	
14		Atere Itienang		3	0	
15		Katarina Biarongo		1	0	
16		Ekera Teata		0	0	
17		Terabeia Tererebu		1	0	
18		Tokaiti Aibo		1	0	
19		Teerataake Taamoa		0	0	

== See also ==
- Kiribati national football team
- Kiribati national futsal team
