= KIFF Pro League =

- Founded: 2026
- First season: 2026
- Country: Kiribati
- Confederation: OFC
- Number of clubs: 8 (League 1); 6 (League 2)
- Level on pyramid: 1–2
- International cup: OFC Champions League (proposed)
- Website: Official website

The KIFF Pro League is a two-tier association football league for football in Kiribati. It is organized by the Kiribati Islands Football Federation.

== History ==
In 2025, the Kiribati Islands Football Federation announced its plan to greatly expand domestic football as part of its quest to become full members of the Oceania Football Confederation and FIFA. In January 2026, the association's executive committee announced the founding of the KIFF Pro League, with the league's first season set to kick off the following month.

== Format ==
The top eight clubs compete in the first-tier League 1. Those clubs vie for the league title. The bottom six clubs compete in League 2, with the winner being promoted to League 1.

== Clubs ==
The following clubs competed in the leagues for the 2026 season.

=== League 1 (Tier I) ===
- Rainbow FC
- Tekinati FC
- Tentanini FC
- Goodlife FC
- Liema FC
- Eita FC
- Teaoraereke FC
- Waterfront FC

=== League 2 (Tier II) ===
- Bairiki FC
- Dijoren FC
- Outbreak FC
- Profound FC
- Temwaiku FC
- Vodafone FC

== List of winners ==
Season	League 1	League 2	Ref(s)
2026			
