= Sienna Saveska =

Australian soccer player (born 2006)

- Saveska playing for Melbourne Victory in 2026

Personal information
- Full name: Sienna Saveska
- Date of birth: 25 September 2006 (age 20)
- Place of birth: Wollongong, New South Wales, Australia
- Height: 1.67 m (5 ft 6 in)
- Position: Attacking midfielder

Team information
- Current team: Melbourne Victory
- Number: 10

Youth career
- Illawarra Stingrays
- Football NSW Institute

Senior career*
Years	Team	Apps	(Gls)
2022–2023	Western Sydney Wanderers	7	(1)
2023–2024	Sydney FC	4	(0)
2024–2025	Western Sydney Wanderers	22	(7)
2025–	Melbourne Victory	3	(0)

International career^{‡}
2024–	Australia U20	4	(9)
- * Club domestic league appearances and goals as of 12 January 2026 ‡ National team caps and goals as of 12 January 2026

Sienna Saveska (25 September 2006) is an Australian soccer player who plays as a midfielder for A-League Women club Melbourne Victory and the Australia under-20 national team. She previously played for A-League Women clubs Western Sydney Wanderers and Sydney FC.

== Early life ==
Saveska was born on 25 September 2006 in Wollongong, to Macedonian parents, she does not have a middle name.

Her childhood dream in soccer was to play for Sydney FC. As a junior she played for Port Kembla.

== Club career ==
=== Western Sydney Wanderers (2022–2023) ===
Saveska signed for Western Sydney Wanderers ahead of the 2022–23 season. She made her A-League Women debut on 8 January 2023, coming on as a substitute in a 2–0 home win over Melbourne City at Wanderers Football Park in Rooty Hill. She scored her first A-League goal on 1 April 2023 in the final round of the regular season, scoring in a 2–1 away loss to Western United at City Vista Recreation Reserve in Plumpton, finishing the season with one goal in seven appearances.

=== Sydney FC (2023–2024) ===
Saveska signed for Sydney FC on a free transfer from Sydney Derby arch-rivals Western Sydney Wanderers ahead of the 2023–24 season, completing what she said was a childhood dream to play for the club. She made her debut for the club in the first round of the season on 14 October 2023, being substituted on in a 2–0 home win over her former club Western Sydney Wanderers in the Sydney Derby at Sydney Football Stadium in Moore Park, in front of 11,471 fans. She finished the season with no goals in just four appearances for the club, though did win a championship with the club, defeating Melbourne City 1–0 in the grand final at Melbourne Rectangular Stadium in East Melbourne.

=== Western Sydney Wanderers (2024–2025) ===
Saveska re-signed for Western Sydney Wanderers ahead of the 2024–25 season. She made her redebut on 3 November 2024 in the opening round, starting in a 2–2 draw away to Newcastle Jets at Cessnock Sportsground in Cessnock, in which she scored her first goal in her second spell at the club. On 14 December 2025, she scored her first A-League Women hat-trick, netting three goals in 17 minutes in a 5–1 home win over Western United at Western Sydney Stadium in Parramatta. She became a starter for the club and finished the season with seven goals in 22 matches in what was widely regarded as her breakout season. However, Wanderers ended the season in last place.

=== Melbourne Victory (2025–) ===
Saveska signed for Melbourne Victory ahead of the 2025–26 season. She made her debut on 23 December 2025, coming on as a substitute in a 2–1 away loss to Melbourne City in the Melbourne Derby at Melbourne Rectangular Stadium in East Melbourne.

== International career ==
Saveska has represented Australia at an under-20 level, having played in qualifying matches for the 2024 and 2026 AFC U-20 Asian Cups.
