= Vanuatu women's national football team =

Women's national association football team representing Vanuatu

Vanuatu
- Association: Vanuatu Football Federation (VFF)
- Confederation: OFC (Oceania)
- Head coach: Jean Robert Yelou
- Captain: Elodie Samuel
- Most caps: Jane Alatoa (12)
- Top scorer: Lavinia Taga (11)
- Home stadium: Port Vila Municipal Stadium
- FIFA code: VAN
First colours	Second colours

FIFA ranking
- Current: 108 ▲3 (16 June 2026)
- Highest: 82 (December 2003 – June 2004)
- Lowest: 122 (December 2021; August – December 2022; June – August 2023; March 2024)

First international
- Tonga 3–2 Vanuatu (Nausori, Fiji; 30 June 2003)

Biggest win
- Kiribati 0–11 Vanuatu (Suva, Fiji; 10 July 2003)

Biggest defeat
- New Zealand 14–0 Vanuatu (Auckland, New Zealand; 29 September 2010)

OFC Women's Nations Cup
- Appearances: 3 (first in 2010)
- Best result: Group stage (2010, 2022, 2025)

The Vanuatu women's national football team represents Vanuatu in international women's association football. The team is controlled by the Vanuatu Football Federation (VFF). Vanuatu's home field is the Port Vila Municipal Stadium, located in the country's capital, Port Vila. The team is managed by Job Alwin.

Vanuatu never qualified for a FIFA Women's World Cup, but competed in the 2010 OFC Women's Championship, hosted by New Zealand during September–October 2010. The team also participated in the 2003 South Pacific Games football tournament. Vanuatu also competed in the 2022 OFC Women's Nations Cup.

== History ==
Vanuatu's first match was played in Nausori, Fiji at the Ratu Cakobau Park on 30 June 2003, against Tonga, who also played its first match. Tonga won the match, despite losing 2–1 at the end of the first half. Five days later, Vanuatu achieved a draw with Papua New Guinea, by 2–2. The team's biggest win was accomplished against Kiribati by 11–0 another five days later. Lavinia Taga scored seven goals for Vanuatu. In the other games, Fiji, Guam and Tahiti defeated the Vanuatuans.

The team was expected to participate in the 2003 and 2007 OFC Women's Championships, but ultimately withdrew from both.

After seven years of inactivity, Vanuatu returned to the international competition in the 2010 OFC Women's Championship in New Zealand. With only one goal, scored by midfielder Stephanie Tougen, the team finished last in the Group A table, after losing all of its games against the Cook Islands, New Zealand and Tahiti.

Vanuatu failed to qualify for the 2012 Olympics tournament, due to its poor performance in the qualifiers. Nevertheless, the team managed to achieve a second victory, with Samoa.

In 2026, Vanuatu will participate in the second round of the OFC qualification for the 2027 FIFA Women's World Cup. In the group stage, they will face Papua New Guinea, Fiji, and New Caledonia.

== Results and fixtures ==
The following is a list of match results in the last 12 months, as well as any future matches that have been scheduled.

Legend

Win Draw Lose Fixture

=== 2026 ===
27 February 2026 2027 FIFA Women's World Cup OFC Qualification	Papua New Guinea	5–0	Vanuatu	Ba
12:00 UTC+12	Padio 5'; Elipas 16', 90'; Kaipu 44'; Pala 62'	Report (OFC); Report (FIFA)		Stadium: Govind Park; Attendance: 100

2 March 2026 2027 FIFA Women's World Cup OFC Qualification	New Caledonia	2–1	Vanuatu	Ba
12:00 UTC+12	Dralu 14'; Hmae 34'	Report (OFC); Report (FIFA)	Simon 83'	Stadium: Govind Park; Attendance: 50; Referee: Beth Rattray (New Zealand)

5 March 2026 2027 FIFA Women's World Cup OFC Qualification	Vanuatu	0–1	Fiji	Ba
16:00 UTC+12		Report (OFC); Report (FIFA)	Diyalowai 20'	Stadium: Govind Park; Attendance: 150; Referee: Sarah Jones (New Zealand)

== Head-to-head record ==
Key

Positive balance (more wins than losses)
Neutral balance (as many wins as losses)
Negative balance (more losses than wins)

The following table shows Vanuatu's all-time official international record per opponent:

Opponent	Pld	W	D	L	GF	GA	GD	W%
American Samoa	1	1	0	0	1	0	+1	100.00
Cook Islands	2	0	0	2	1	4	−3	00.00
Fiji	6	1	1	4	7	13	−6	16.67
Guam	1	0	0	1	0	1	−1	00.00
Kiribati	1	1	0	0	11	0	+11	100.00
New Caledonia	2	0	0	2	1	8	−7	00.00
New Zealand	2	0	0	2	0	19	−19	00.00
Papua New Guinea	4	0	1	3	4	23	−19	00.00
Samoa	3	1	0	2	5	5	±0	33.33
Singapore	1	1	0	0	2	0	+2	100.00
Solomon Islands	7	4	1	2	10	4	+6	57.14
Tahiti	4	1	1	2	3	9	−6	25.00
Tonga	5	1	1	3	10	12	−2	20.00
Total	39	11	5	23	55	98	−43	28.21

== Coaching staff ==
=== Current technical staff ===
As of 27 February 2026

Position	Name
Head coach	Jean Robert Yelou
Assistant coach	Ken Kanegai
Goalkeeper coach	Wilson Marango
Team manager	Justina Rono
Kit manager	Brenda Anis
Safeguarding officer	Jimmy Yannick
Media officer	Yoshiyuki Takahashi

=== Managerial history ===
Manager	Career	Played	Won	Drawn	Lost	Win %	Competitions
Unknown	2003–2011	11	1	1	9	9.1	
(Vanuatu) Florian Sam	2012–2015	4	1	0	3	25.0	
(Vanuatu) Job Alwin	2015–2016	0	0	0	0	—	
(China) Wu Kangzhen	2017–2019	3	1	2	0	33.3	

== Players ==
=== Current squad ===
- The following players were named to the squad for the 2027 FIFA Women's World Cup qualification in Oceania region second round, held from 27 February to 5 March 2026.

Squad list for the 2027 FIFA Women's World Cup qualification (OFC) second round.

No.	Pos.	Player	Date of birth (age)	Club
1	GK	Vanissa Wilson	{{{age}}}	ABM Galaxy
12	GK	Flavia Peter	{{{age}}}	{{{club}}}
21	GK	Amelia Reddy	{{{age}}}	ABM Galaxy
2	DF	Annie Rose Gere	{{{age}}}	Benben United
3	DF	Jesta Toka	{{{age}}}	{{{club}}}
4	DF	Nelly Kaltack	{{{age}}}	ABM Galaxy
5	DF	Limas Erikan	{{{age}}}	ABM Galaxy
14	DF	Nellie Vuti	{{{age}}}	{{{club}}}
15	DF	Noeline Erikan	{{{age}}}	ABM Galaxy
20	DF	Gaylindrah Atrina Tari	{{{age}}}	{{{club}}}
13	MF	Valerie Viralolokwai	{{{age}}}	{{{club}}}
8	MF	Augustine Mansale	{{{age}}}	{{{club}}}
6	MF	Nadine Kiletier	{{{age}}}	{{{club}}}
9	MF	Leimata Simon	{{{age}}}	{{{club}}}
17	MF	Marie Metoriki	{{{age}}}	NRTC Women's FC
18	MF	Fevie Rina Siehi	{{{age}}}	Huka 21 Women's Team
10	MF	Onica Kaltack	{{{age}}}	{{{club}}}
19	FW	Nettie Kalsau	{{{age}}}	LL Echo Senior Women FC
23	FW	Elina Aruvuha	{{{age}}}	{{{club}}}
11	FW	Pindy Erikan	{{{age}}}	{{{club}}}

=== Recent call-ups ===
The following players have been called up for the team in the last 12 months.

Pos.	Player	Date of birth (age)	Caps	Goals	Club	Latest call-up

== Competitive record ==
=== FIFA Women's World Cup ===
FIFA Women's World Cup									Qualification					
Year	Result	Position	Pld	W	D	L	GF	GA	Pld	W	D	L	GF	GA
(China) 1991	Did not enter													
(Sweden) 1995	Did not enter													
(United States) 1999	Did not enter													
(United States) 2003	Withdrew													
(China) 2007	Withdrew													
(Germany) 2011	Did not qualify								3	0	0	3	1	21
(Canada) 2015	Did not enter													
(France) 2019	Did not qualify								3	2	0	1	3	5
(Australia) (New Zealand) 2023	Did not qualify								2	0	1	1	1	3
(Brazil) 2027	To be determined								To be determined					
Total	–	–	–	–	–	–	–	–	8	2	1	5	5	29

=== Olympic Games ===
Summer Olympics									Qualification					
Year	Result	Position	Pld	W	D	L	GF	GA	Pld	W	D	L	GF	GA
(United States) 1996	Ineligible								No qualifying process					
(Australia) 2000	Ineligible								No qualifying process					
(Greece) 2004	Did not enter													
(China) 2008	Did not enter													
(United Kingdom) 2012	Did not qualify								4	1	0	3	8	20
(Brazil) 2016	Did not enter													
(Japan) 2020	Did not qualify								2	0	1	1	1	3
Total	–	–	–	–	–	–	–	–	6	1	1	4	9	23

=== OFC Women's Nations Cup ===
OFC Women's Nations Cup									Qualification record					
Year	Result	Position	Pld	W	D	L	GF	GA	Pld	W	D	L	GF	GA
(New Caledonia) 1983	Did not enter								No qualification					
(New Zealand) 1986	Did not enter								No qualification					
(Australia) 1989	Did not enter								No qualification					
(Australia) 1991	Did not enter								No qualification					
(Papua New Guinea) 1994	Did not enter								No qualification					
(New Zealand) 1998	Did not enter								No qualification					
(Australia) 2003	Withdrew								No qualification					
(Papua New Guinea) 2007	Withdrew								No qualification					
(New Zealand) 2010	Group stage	8th	3	0	0	3	1	21	No qualification					
(Papua New Guinea) 2014	Did not enter								No qualification					
(New Caledonia) 2018	Did not qualify								3	2	0	1	3	5
(Fiji) 2022	Group stage	9th	2	0	1	1	1	3	No qualification					
Total	Group stage	2/12	5	0	1	4	2	24	3	2	0	1	3	5

=== Pacific Games ===
Pacific Games
Year	Result	Position	Pld	W	D	L	GF	GA
(Fiji) 2003	Group stage	6th	6	1	1	4	17	12
(Samoa) 2007	Did not enter							
(New Caledonia) 2011	Did not enter							
(Papua New Guinea) 2015	Did not enter							
(Samoa) 2019	Group stage	5th	4	0	1	3	3	10
(Solomon Islands) 2023	Group stage	5th	4	2	0	2	6	6
Total	Group stage	3/6	14	3	2	9	26	28

=== Pacific Mini Games ===
Pacific Games
Year	Result	Pld	W	D	L	GF	GA	GD
(Vanuatu) 2017	Champions	4	2	2	0	9	3	+6
Total	1/1	3	1	2	0	7	2	+5

== See also ==
- Sport in Vanuatu
  - Football in Vanuatu
    - Women's football in Vanuatu
- Vanuatu men's national football team
