= Australia women's national under-20 soccer team =

National association football team

Australia under-20
- Nickname: Young Matildas
- Association: Football Australia
- Confederation: AFC (Asia)
- Sub-confederation: AFF (South-East Asia)
- Head coach: Alex Epakis
- FIFA code: AUS
First colours	Second colours

FIFA U-20 Women's World Cup
- Appearances: 5 (first in 2002)
- Best result: Quarter-finals (2002, 2004)

The Australian women's national under-20 soccer team represents Australia in international women's under-20 soccer. The team is controlled by the governing body for soccer in Australia, Football Australia (FA), which is currently a member of the Asian Football Confederation (AFC) and the regional ASEAN Football Federation (AFF) since leaving the Oceania Football Confederation (OFC) in 2006. The team's official nickname is the Young Matildas.

== History ==
The Australia women's national under-20 soccer team (later nicknamed Young Matildas) were established in the early 1990s. Initially they were organised as an under-19 team, which played a three-match series against New Zealand U19 in Australia in September 1991. Another U19 squad toured Netherlands in 1998. As a member of Oceania Football Confederation (OFC) the Young Matildas participated in the 2002 OFC Women's Under 19 Qualifying Tournament, held in Tonga from 23 April to 3 May. After winning their group matches against Tonga (hosts) 0–16 and Cook Islands (0–15) they defeated Samoa (13–0) in the semi-final and New Zealand (0–6) in the final. With that victory Australia U19 qualified for the 2002 FIFA U-19 Women's World Championship (predecessor to U-20 Women's World Cup). That tournament was held in Canada in August–September, and the Young Matildas finished fifth. This is the highest finishing place in a FIFA sanctioned world-wide competition of any Australian women's national soccer team until the 2023 FIFA Women's World Cup, when the senior Matildas reached fourth.

In April 2004 with Adrian Santrac coaching, the team won the 2004 OFC Women's Under 19 Qualifying Tournament, where they defeated Solomon Islands 13–0, and hosts Papua New Guinea 14–1, to proceed to the U-19 Women's World Championship in Thailand in November. The Young Matildas were sent home after losing their quarterfinal 0–2 against United States.

Young Matildas became a U-20 team when FIFA changed the upper age limit for its top women's age-grade competition from 19 to 20 effective in 2006. Also during that year all Australian international soccer teams switched from OFC to Asian Football Confederation (AFC). Alistair Edwards, as coach, took the team to the 2006 AFC U-19 Women's Championship in Malaysia in April, where they finished third by defeating Japan 3–2 in the third place play-off. Due to their performance, the Young Matildas qualified for the 2006 FIFA U-20 Women's World Championship, held in Russia. At that tournament Australia U20 were eliminated in the group stage.

As the third-placed team for the 2006 tournament, the Young Matildas automatically qualified for 2007 AFC U-19 Women's Championship in Chongqing, China during October 2007. With their 1–0 loss against Japan and a 2–1 loss against North Korea, the Australians were eliminated at the group stage and did not qualify for the 2008 FIFA U-20 Women's World Cup. The Young Matildas did not qualify for any U-19/U-20 world cup until 2022 when Leah Blayney coached the Australian squad in Costa Rica, where they were eliminated in the group stage.

From 2013 to 2018, the Young Matildas represented their nation at successive AFF Women's Championships (later renamed ASEAN Women's Championships): a regional tournament for senior national teams in the ASEAN Football Federation (AFF). Australia U20's best performances were finishing runners-up in both 2013 and 2018. In the latter final, they lost 3–2 against three-time champion Thailand despite Mary Fowler's Player of the Match performance scoring both Australian goals - Fowler also won the Golden Boot for most goals (ten) in the tournament.

Blayney coached the squad, which qualified for the 2024 AFC U-20 Women's Asian Cup, held in Uzbekistan in March. The Young Matildas reached the finals, finishing third by defeating South Korea, 1–0. New coach Alex Epakis oversaw their three victories in the 2026 AFC U-20 Women's Asian Cup qualifiers for Group C, held during August 2025 in Tajikistan. Young Matildas reached the related tournament, which was held in April 2026 in Thailand.

== Results and fixtures ==
The following is a list of match results in the last 12 months, as well as any future matches that have been scheduled.

Legend

Win Draw Loss Fixture

=== 2025 ===
28 November Friendly	Australia	1–0	South Korea	Canberra, Australia
	Halmarick 41'	Report (FA); Report (KFA)		Stadium: Australian Institute of Sport; Attendance: 0 (behind closed doors)

30 November Friendly	Australia	4–1	South Korea	Canberra, Australia
	Prakash 27'; Allan 61'; Kuilamu 73'; Galic 90+3'	Report (FA); Report (KFA)	Lee Hae-nae 41'	Stadium: Australian Institute of Sport; Attendance: 0 (behind closed doors)

=== 2026 ===
2 April 2026 U-20 Asian Cup GS	Australia	5–0	Chinese Taipei	Pathum Thani, Thailand
16:00 UTC+7	Halmarick 24', 50'; Fuller 44'; Trimis 53', 61'	Report		Stadium: Pathum Thani Stadium; Attendance: 75; Referee: Gulshoda Saidqulova (Uzbekistan)

5 April 2026 U-20 Asian Cup GS	India	0–5	Australia	Pathum Thani, Thailand
16:00 UTC+7		Report	Halmarick 38' (pen.), 39', 48'; Butrus 54'; Brown 90+4'	Stadium: Pathum Thani Stadium; Attendance: 66; Referee: Esra'a Al-Mbaidin (Jordan)

8 April 2026 U-20 Asian Cup GS	Japan	5–2	Australia	Nonthaburi, Thailand
16:00 UTC+7	Fukushima 45+3', 54'; Tago 65'; Kimura 81', 84'	Report	Prakash 39'; Brown 86'	Stadium: Nonthaburi Province Stadium; Referee: Rawdha Al-Mansoori (United Arab Emirates)

12 April 2026 U-20 Asian Cup QF	North Korea	3–0	Australia	Pathum Thani, Thailand
16:00 UTC+7	Pak Ok-i 3'; Sullivan 74' (o.g.); Ro Un-hyang 90'	Report		Stadium: Pathum Thani Stadium; Attendance: 137; Referee: Gulshoda Saidqulova (Uzbekistan)

20 May Friendly	Australia	1–1	New Zealand	Canberra, Australia
	Trimis	Report	Bangalan 85'	Stadium: Australian Institute of Sport; Attendance: 0 (behind closed doors)

23 May Friendly	Australia	0–0	New Zealand	Canberra, Australia
		Report		Stadium: Australian Institute of Sport

== Coaching staff ==
Position	Name
Head coach	Alex Epakis

Former managers

- Mike Mulvey (fl. 2001)
- Adrian Santrac (fl. 2004)
- Alistair Edwards (2005–2006)
- Alen Stajcic (2007–2010)
- Jeff Hopkins (2011–2012)
- Spencer Prior (2012–2013)
- Ante Juric (2014–2015)
- Gary van Egmond (fl. 2016–2019)
- Leah Blayney (2019–2024)
- Kory Babington (2025, interim coach)
- Alex Epakis (2025–present)

== Players ==
=== Current squad ===
The following 25 players were called up for friendlies against New Zealand on 20 and 23 May.

Caps and goals are current as of 23 May 2026 after the match against New Zealand.

No.	Pos.	Player	Date of birth (age)	Caps	Goals	Club
1	GK	Ilona Melegh	2 July 2008 (age 18)	9	0	(Football Australia) Adelaide United
18	GK	Georgia Ritchie	11 March 2008 (age 18)	0	0	(Football Australia) Newcastle Jets
2	DF	Amelia Bennett	22 May 2008 (age 18)	6	0	(Football Australia) Western Sydney Wanderers
3	DF	Tegan Bertolissio	1 August 2006 (age 20)	14	0	(Football Australia) Canberra United
21	DF	Isabela Hoyos	23 May 2008 (age 18)			(Football Australia) Brisbane Roar
22	DF	Rubi Sullivan	7 January 2009 (age 17)	8	0	(Football Australia) Sydney FC
24	DF	Amy Barker	17 June 2008 (age 18)	0	0	(Football Australia) Western Sydney Wanderers
26	DF	Chelsea Biggs		0	0	(Football Australia) Melbourne City
4	MF	Poppy O'Keefe	17 August 2008 (age 18)	4	0	(Football Australia) Melbourne Victory
5	MF	Daisy Brown	13 July 2006 (age 20)	4	2	(Football Australia) Brisbane Roar
6	MF	Emma Dundas	29 May 2007 (age 19)	6	0	(Football Australia) Newcastle Jets
7	MF	Avaani Prakash	13 December 2006 (age 19)	16	4	(Football Australia) Central Coast Mariners
14	MF	Zara Kruger	29 May 2006 (age 20)	21	1	(Football Australia) Brisbane Roar
17	MF	Ischia Brooking	23 November 2008 (age 17)	1	0	(Football Australia) Perth Glory
20	MF	Clara Hoarau	8 April 2007 (age 19)	1	0	(French Football Federation) Fleury 91
8	FW	Miriam Zumaya	23 June 2008 (age 18)	0	0	(Football Australia) Western Sydney Wanderers
9	FW	Skye Halmarick	13 February 2008 (age 18)	8	11	(Football Australia) Central Coast Mariners
10	FW	Amelia Cassar	9 February 2008 (age 18)	6	0	(Football Australia) Sydney FC
11	FW	Tiana Fuller	28 July 2008 (age 18)	6	2	(Football Australia) Central Coast Mariners
13	FW	Peta Trimis	18 May 2006 (age 20)	18	7	(Football Australia) Central Coast Mariners
15	FW	Lily Punch	25 September 2008 (age 18)	1	0	(Football Australia) Brisbane Roar
16	FW	Allyssa Ng-Saad	12 August 2008 (age 18)	0	0	(Football Australia) Western Sydney Wanderers
19	FW	Talia Younis	26 October 2008 (age 17)	5	0	(Football Australia) Western Sydney Wanderers
23	FW	Sienna Dale	19 April 2007 (age 19)	3	0	(Football Australia) Canberra United
25	FW	Eliza Familton	17 January 2008 (age 18)	0	0	(Football Australia) Central Coast Mariners
	FW	Sienna Saveska	25 September 2006 (age 20)	3	3	(Football Australia) Melbourne Victory

=== Recent call-ups ===
The following players were called up to the squad within the last 12 months and still remain eligible for selection.

Pos.	Player	Date of birth (age)	Caps	Goals	Club	Latest call-up
GK	Jasmine Black	3 May 2006 (age 20)	1	0	(United States) George Washington Revolutionaries	2026 AFC U-20 Women's Asian Cup
GK	Sofia Fante	2 March 2008 (age 18)	0	0	(Australia) Sydney FC	v. South Korea, 30 November 2025
DF	Alexia Apostolakis	16 May 2006 (age 20)	25	1	Unattached	2026 AFC U-20 Women's Asian Cup
DF	India Breier	30 April 2006 (age 20)	3	1	(Australia) Adelaide United	2026 AFC U-20 Women's Asian Cup
DF	Amali Kinsella	1 December 2006 (age 19)	2	0	(Australia) Brisbane Roar	2026 AFC U-20 Women’s Asian Cup Qualifiers
MF	Shelby McMahon	13 May 2008 (age 18)	3	0	(Australia) Melbourne City	2026 AFC U-20 Women's Asian Cup
MF	Claire Adams	26 August 2006 (age 20)	0	0	(Australia) Newcastle Jets	v. South Korea, 30 November 2025
MF	Madeleine Caspers	15 March 2007 (age 19)	6	1	(Australia) Sydney University	v. South Korea, 30 November 2025
MF	Daniela Galic	17 June 2006 (age 20)	19	6	(Sweden) Vittsjö GIK	v. South Korea, 30 November 2025
MF	Sian Dewey	9 June 2007 (age 19)	1	0	(Australia) Adelaide United	2026 AFC U-20 Women’s Asian Cup Qualifiers
FW	Danella Butrus	13 February 2007 (age 19)	4	1	(Australia) Melbourne City	2026 AFC U-20 Women's Asian Cup
FW	Alexis Collins	10 March 2008 (age 18)	0	0	(Australia) Newcastle Jets	2026 AFC U-20 Women's Asian Cup
FW	Caley Tallon-Henniker	17 February 2006 (age 20)	2	0	(Australia) Sydney FC	2026 AFC U-20 Women's Asian Cup
FW	Josie Allan	23 June 2006 (age 20)	0	0	(Australia) Newcastle Jets	v. South Korea, 30 November 2025
FW	Grace Kuilamu	13 March 2007 (age 19)	0	0	(Australia) Brisbane Roar	v. South Korea, 30 November 2025
FW	Kiera Meyers	22 June 2007 (age 19)	0	0	(Australia) Adelaide United	v. South Korea, 30 November 2025
FW	Milly Boughton	3 February 2006 (age 20)	8	0	(Scotland) Hibernian	2026 AFC U-20 Women’s Asian Cup Qualifiers
FW	Amber Luchtmeijer	26 February 2007 (age 19)	5	2	(Australia) Sydney FC	2026 AFC U-20 Women’s Asian Cup Qualifiers

Notes

- ^{PRE} Preliminary squad / on stand-by.
- ^{INJ} Withdrew due to injury

== Competitive record ==
=== FIFA U-20 Women's World Cup ===
Year	Result	Pld	W	D	L	GF	GA
(Canada) 2002	Quarter-finals	4	1	1	2	8	9
(Thailand) 2004	Quarter-finals	4	1	0	3	6	8
(Russia) 2006	Group stage	3	1	1	1	4	3
(Chile) 2008	Did not qualify						
(Germany) 2010	Did not qualify						
(Japan) 2012	Did not qualify						
(Canada) 2014	Did not qualify						
(Papua New Guinea) 2016	Did not qualify						
(France) 2018	Did not qualify						
(Costa Rica) 2022	Group stage	3	1	0	2	3	6
(Colombia) 2024	Group stage	3	0	0	3	0	6
(Poland) 2026	Did not qualify						
Total	5/12	17	4	2	11	21	32

=== OFC U-20 Women's qualifying tournament ===
OFC Women's U-20 Qualifying Tournament record
Year	Result	Position	Pld	W	D	L	GF	GA
(Tonga) 2002	Winners	1st	4	4	0	0	45	0
(Papua New Guinea) 2004	Winners	1st	2	2	0	0	27	1
Total	2/2	2 Titles	6	6	0	0	72	1

=== AFC U-20 Women's Asian Cup ===
AFC U-20 Women's Asian Cup									Qualification					
Year	Result	Position	Pld	W	D	L	GF	GA	Pld	W	D	L	GF	GA
(India) 2002	Did not enter								No qualification					
(China) 2004	Did not enter								No qualification					
(Malaysia) 2006	Third place	3rd	5	4	0	1	29	6	2	2	0	0	12	2
(China) 2007	Group stage	5th	3	1	0	2	3	4	automatically qualified					
(China) 2009	Group stage	5th	3	1	1	1	6	3	4	3	0	1	28	2
(Vietnam) 2011	Fifth place	5th	5	1	0	4	7	12	automatically qualified					
(China) 2013	Fifth place	5th	5	1	0	4	6	12	automatically qualified					
(China) 2015	Group stage	5th	3	1	0	2	3	4	3	3	0	0	28	0
(China) 2017	Fourth place	4th	5	2	0	3	8	11	2	2	0	0	23	1
(Thailand) 2019	Fourth place	4th	5	2	0	3	6	22	6	6	0	0	41	3
(Uzbekistan) ~~2022~~	Competition cancelled													
(Uzbekistan) 2024	Third place	3rd	5	4	0	1	9	6	5	5	0	0	30	0
(Thailand) 2026	Quarter-finals	5th	4	2	0	2	12	8	3	3	0	0	20	0
Total:10/12	Third place	3rd	43	19	1	23	89	88	25	24	0	1	182	8

=== ASEAN Women's Championship ===
ASEAN Women's Championship record
Year	Result	Position	Pld	W	D	L	GF	GA
(Vietnam) 2004	Did not enter							
(Vietnam) 2006	Did not enter							
(Myanmar) 2007	Did not enter							
(Vietnam) 2008	See Australia women's national soccer team							
(Laos) 2011	Did not enter							
(Vietnam) 2012	Did not enter							
(Myanmar) 2013	Runners-up	2nd	6	4	2	0	12	5
(Vietnam) 2015	Third place	3rd	5	4	0	1	15	4
(Myanmar) 2016	Fourth place	4th	5	2	1	2	26	4
(Indonesia) 2018	Runners-up	2nd	6	4	0	2	36	9
(Thailand) 2019	Did not enter							
(Philippines) 2022	See Australia women's national under-23 soccer team							
(Vietnam) 2025	See Australia women's national under-23 soccer team							
Total	4/12	0 titles	22	14	3	5	89	22

=== ASEAN U-19 Women's Championship ===
ASEAN U-19 Women's Championship record
Year	Result	Position	Pld	W	D	L	GF	GA
(Indonesia) 2022	See Australia women's national under-17 soccer team							
(Indonesia) 2023	Did not enter							
(Vietnam) 2025	Did not enter							
Total	0/0	0	0	0	0	0	0	0

== Honours ==
OFC Women's U-20 Qualifying Tournament

- Winners: 2002, 2004

AFC U-20 Women's Asian Cup

- Third place: 2006, 2024

ASEAN Women's Championship

- Second place: 2013, 2018
- Third place: 2015

PacificAus Sports Four Nations Tournament

- Winners: 2025

== See also ==
- Soccer in Australia
- Australia women's national soccer team
- Australia women's national under-23 soccer team
- Australia women's national under-17 soccer team
