= 2024–25 Melbourne City FC (women) season =

10th season in existence of Melbourne City FC (women)

Melbourne City (women)
2024–25 season
- Owner: City Football Group
- Chairman: Khaldoon Al Mubarak
- Head coach: Michael Matricciani
- Stadium: ctrl:cyber Pitch; AAMI Park (doubleheaders)
- A-League Women: 1st
- A-League Women Finals: Semi-final
- AFC Women's Champions League: Runners-up
- Top goalscorer: League: Holly McNamara (15); All: Holly McNamara (16)
- Highest home attendance: 2,340 vs. Brisbane Roar (11 January 2025); A-League Women
- Lowest home attendance: 323 vs. Adelaide United (16 March 2025); A-League Women
- Average home league attendance: 1,147
- Biggest win: 4–0 vs. Kaya–Iloilo (N) (12 October 2024); AFC Women's Champions League; 5–1 vs. Western United (H) (5 February 2025); A-League Women; 5–1 vs. Perth Glory (A) (18 April 2025); A-League Women
Home colours	Away colours	Third colours
- All statistics correct as of 19 April 2025.

The 2024–25 season was Melbourne City Football Club's tenth season in the A-League Women. They also participated in the AFC Women's Champions League for the first time.

Before the beginning of the season, head coach Dario Vidošić left the club, having been appointed as coach of English Women's Super League club Brighton & Hove Albion.

The 2023–24 season saw Melbourne City win their fourth Premiership, securing qualification for the 2024–25 AFC Women's Champions League. They lost the Grand Final for the first time in their history, going down 1–0 to Sydney FC.

== Review ==
=== Pre-season ===
On 13 June, Melbourne City confirmed that their top goalscorer and New Zealand attacker Hannah Wilkinson would depart following the conclusion of her contract. The day after, American centre-back Taylor Otto re-signed for the season. Four further players departed on 27 June; Naomi Chinnama, Julia Grosso, Emina Ekic, and Bárbara. After winning the A-League Women Young Footballer of the Year, Daniela Galic confirmed her departure on 1 July in pursueing an overseas opportunity.

The first new signing was confirmed also on 1 July, where Western Sydney Wanderers defender Alexia Apostolakis signed for two years. Then two days later, Wellington Phoenix attacker and Venezuelan international Mariana Speckmaier signed for two years as well. During the week, Rebekah Stott was selected for New Zealand at the 2024 Summer Olympics football tournament in Paris, France. The week after, it was announced that head coach Dario Vidošić was appointed as new manager for Brighton & Hove Albion. Laura Hughes, Karly Roestbakken, and Bryleeh Henry then all signed two-year contract extensions on 17 July.

On 25 July, City signed Spanish goalkeeper Malena Mieres for the season from Liga F club Real Betis. Six days after on 31 July, Adelaide United attacker Emilia Murray signed for City for two years. The week after on 7 August, Shelby McMahon who signed for the club during last season as an injury replacement signed on for a further three years. On 9 August, Apostolakis and Murray were selected for the Young Matildas' squad for 2024 FIFA U-20 Women's World Cup to run through August–September. That same day, American attacker Cariel Ellis signed for City on a one-year deal.

New head coach Michael Matricciani was confirmed on 21 August. On 3 September, Mexican-American midfielder Lourdes Bosch signed on a two-year contract. On 11 September, Cariel Ellis who had only signed for City in the last month had agreed to a mutual termination of her contract and returning to the United States due to personal reasons. The same day saw the return of Serbian defender and four-time championship winner Tyla-Jay Vlajnic on a one-year deal.

The first A-League fixtures occurred after the group stage of the AFC Women's Champions League in October.

n 24 September, Melissa Barbieri re-signed for the season entering a 28th year in her professional career.[20] Two days later, Isabella Accardo and Caitlin Karic both re-signed on one year deals.[21]

=== October ===
On 3 October, Matricciani named a 21-player squad for the upcoming group stage of the AFC Women's Champions League AFC Women's Champions League in Thailand; with all recruits in line to make their debuts with Holly McNamara and Sophia Varley out of the squad due to injuries. Two days later, Rebekah Stott was confirmed as captain for City in the 2024–25 season.

City started their inaugural AFC Women's Champions League run with the first group match against Bam Khatoon on 6 October. City won 2–1 after first half goals from Rhianna Pollicina and Mariana Speckmaier.

== Players ==
=== First-team squad ===
Note: Flags indicate national team as defined under FIFA eligibility rules; some limited exceptions apply. Players may hold more than one non-FIFA nationality.

No.	Pos.	Nation	Player
1	GK	AUS	Sophia Varley
5	DF	USA	Taylor Otto
6	MF	AUS	Leticia McKenna
7	FW	CAN	Kathryn Harvey
8	MF	AUS	Alexia Apostolakis
9	FW	AUS	Holly McNamara
10	MF	AUS	Rhianna Pollicina
11	MF	AUS	Emilia Murray
12	MF	AUS	Shelby McMahon
13	DF	NZL	Rebekah Stott (captain)
14	MF	AUS	Laura Hughes

No.	Pos.	Nation	Player
15	MF	AUS	Kiera Meyers (scholarship)
16	DF	AUS	Karly Roestbakken
17	FW	VEN	Mariana Speckmaier
18	DF	AUS	Leah Davidson
19	MF	MEX	Lourdes Bosch
20	FW	AUS	Caitlin Karic
21	MF	AUS	Isabella Accardo
22	FW	AUS	Bryleeh Henry
23	GK	AUS	Melissa Barbieri
24	GK	ESP	Malena Mieres
27	DF	SRB	Tyla-Jay Vlajnic

== Transfers ==
=== Transfers in ===
No.	Position	Player	Transferred from	Type/fee	Contract length	Date	Ref.
8	MF	Alexia Apostolakis	Western Sydney Wanderers	Free transfer	2 years	1 July 2024	
17	FW	(Venezuela) Mariana Speckmaier	Wellington Phoenix	Free transfer	2 years	3 July 2024	
24	GK	(Spain) Malena Mieres	(Spain) Real Betis	Free transfer	1 year	25 July 2024	
11	MF	Emilia Murray	Adelaide United	Free transfer	2 years	31 July 2024	
—	FW	(United States) Cariel Ellis	Unattached	Free transfer	1 year	9 August 2024	
19	MF	(Mexico) Lourdes Bosch	Unattached	Free transfer	2 years	3 September 2024	
27	DF	(Serbia) Tyla-Jay Vlajnic	Unattached	Free transfer	1 year	11 September 2024	
7	FW	(Canada) Kathryn Harvey	(Turkey) Fatih Vatan Spor	Free transfer	1 year	29 October 2024	

=== Transfers out ===
No.	Position	Player	Transferred to	Type/fee	Date	Ref.
30	GK	Emily Shields	(Australia) Bulleen Lions	End of loan	11 May 2024	
17	FW	(New Zealand) Hannah Wilkinson	Unattached	End of contract	13 June 2024	
3	DF	Naomi Chinnama	Unattached	End of contract	27 June 2024	
7	DF	(United States) Julia Grosso	(United States) Utah Royals	Mutual contract termination	27 June 2024	
11	FW	(Bosnia and Herzegovina) Emina Ekic	(United States) Spokane Zephyr	Mutual contract termination	27 June 2024	
88	GK	(Brazil) Bárbara	Unattached	End of contract	27 June 2024	
24	MF	Daniela Galic	(Netherlands) Twente	End of contract	1 July 2024	
2	DF	Leia Varley	Unattached	End of contract	9 August 2024	
19	MF	Tijan McKenna	Unattached	End of contract	9 August 2024	
—	FW	(United States) Cariel Ellis	Unattached	Mutual contract termination	11 September 2024	

=== Contract extensions ===
No.	Player	Position	Duration	Date	Ref.
5	(United States) Taylor Otto	Centre-back	1 year	14 June 2024	
14	Laura Hughes	Midfielder	2 years	17 July 2024	
16	Karly Roestbakken	Centre-back	2 years	17 July 2024	
22	Bryleeh Henry	Forward	2 years	17 July 2024	
12	Shelby McMahon	Midfielder	3 years	7 August 2024	
23	Melissa Barbieri	Goalkeeper	1 year	24 September 2024	
20	Caitlin Karic	Forward	1 year	26 September 2024	
21	Isabella Accardo	Midfielder	1 year	26 September 2024	

== Pre-season and friendlies ==
26 October 2024	Western United (Australia)	1–0	(Australia) Melbourne City	Melbourne, Australia
14:00 AEDT	Medwin 72'	Report		Attendance: 0 (behind closed doors)

== Competitions ==
=== Overall record ===
Competition	First match	Last match	Starting round	Final position	Record							
Competition	First match	Last match	Starting round	Final position	Pld	W	D	L	GF	GA	GD	Win %
A-League Women	3 November 2024	18 April 2025	Matchday 1	1st	23	16	7	0	56	22	+34	69.57
A-League Women Finals	3 May 2025	11 May 2025	Semi-finals	Semi-finals	2	0	1	1	2	3	−1	0.00
AFC Women's Champions League	6 October 2024	24 May 2025	Group stage	Runners-up	6	5	1	0	14	2	+12	83.33
Total					31	21	9	1	72	27	+45	67.74

Last updated: 24 May 2025
Source: Soccerway

=== A-League Women ===
==== League table ====
Pos	Team	Pld	W	D	L	GF	GA	GD	Pts	Qualification
1	Melbourne City	23	16	7	0	56	22	+34	55	Qualification for AFC Women's Champions League and Finals series
2	Melbourne Victory	23	16	5	2	42	21	+21	53	Qualification for Finals series
3	Adelaide United	23	14	3	6	44	30	+14	45	Qualification for Finals series
4	Central Coast Mariners (C)	23	9	7	7	31	25	+6	34	Qualification for Finals series
5	Canberra United	23	9	6	8	28	31	−3	33	Qualification for Finals series

Source: A-Leagues
Rules for classification: 1) points; 2) goal difference; 3) goals scored; 4) wins; 5) head-to-head results; 5a) head-to-head points; 5b) head-to-head goal difference; 6) Fair Play points; 7) away goal difference; 8) away goals per match; 9) home goal difference; 10) home goals per match; 11) toss of a coin in an event of a tie of two clubs.
(C) Champions

==== Results summary ====
Overall								Home						Away					
Pld	W	D	L	GF	GA	GD	Pts	W	D	L	GF	GA	GD	W	D	L	GF	GA	GD
23	16	7	0	56	22	+34	55	9	2	0	33	14	+19	7	5	0	23	8	+15

Source: A-Leagues
Away figures include Melbourne City's 1–1 draw on neutral ground in Unite Round against Sydney FC on 24 November 2024.

==== Results by round ====
Round	1	2	3	4	5	6	7	8	9	10	11	12	13	14	20	15	16	17	19	18	21	22	23
Ground	H	A	H	N	H	H	A	H	A	A	H	A	A	H	H	A	H	A	H	A	A	H	A
Result	W	W	D	D	W	W	W	W	D	D	W	D	W	D	W	W	W	D	W	W	W	W	W
Position	1	1	1	2	1	1	1	1	1	1	1	1	1	1	1	1	1	1	1	1	1	1	1
Points	3	6	7	8	11	14	17	20	21	22	25	26	29	30	33	36	39	40	43	46	49	52	55

Source: A-Leagues
A = Away; H = Home; N = Neutral; W = Win; D = Draw; L = Loss

==== Matches ====
Win Draw Loss

3 November 2024 1	Melbourne City	5–2	Perth Glory	Melbourne
15:00 AEDT	Pollicina 53', 69'; Harvey 63', 73'; Hughes 90+5'	Report	Brown 7'; Sunaga 51'	Stadium: ctrl:cyber Pitch; Attendance: 582; Referee: Rebecca Durcau

9 November 2024 2	Melbourne Victory	2–3	Melbourne City	Melbourne
14:15 AEDT	Gielnik 20' (pen.); Jancevski 42'	Report	Speckmaier 6', 85'; Bosch 64'	Stadium: AAMI Park; Attendance: 3,850; Referee: Georgia Ghirardello

16 November 2024 3	Melbourne City	2–2	Central Coast Mariners	Melbourne
15:00 AEDT	Apostolakis 3'; Bosch 33'	Report	Rasmussen 5'; Gomez 76'	Stadium: ctrl:cyber Pitch; Attendance: 562; Referee: Kelly Jones

24 November 2024 4	Sydney FC	1–1	Melbourne City	Sydney
16:15 AEDT	Hawkesby 6'	Report	Bosch 11'	Stadium: Netstrata Jubilee Stadium (Note: Match moved from Leichhardt Oval following a pitch assessment.); Attendance: 3,149; Referee: Rachael Mitchenson

30 November 2024 5	Melbourne City	2–0	Western Sydney Wanderers	Melbourne
14:15 AEDT	Speckmaier 42'; Apostolakis 90+4'	Report		Stadium: AAMI Park; Attendance: 2,097; Referee: Caitlin Williams

15 December 2024 6	Melbourne City	4–2	Canberra United	Melbourne
19:45 AEDT	Harvey 48'; Markovski 61' (o.g.); Hughes 77'; McKenna 90+3'	Report	Heyman 12', 89'	Stadium: AAMI Park; Attendance: 926; Referee: Bec Mackie

20 December 2024 7	Adelaide United	1–3	Melbourne City	Adelaide
16:20 ACDT	Barbieri 8' (o.g.)	Report	Speckmaier 1'; Dawber 41' (o.g.); McNamara 74'	Stadium: Coopers Stadium; Attendance: 2,404; Referee: Mikayla Ryan

28 December 2024 8	Melbourne City	2–1	Wellington Phoenix	Melbourne
17:00 AEDT	Kelly 67' (o.g.); Hughes 69'	Report	Fergusson 37'	Stadium: ctrl:cyber Pitch; Attendance: 421; Referee: Kelly Jones

31 December 2024 9	Central Coast Mariners	0–0	Melbourne City	Gosford
16:15 AEDT		Report		Stadium: Industree Group Stadium; Attendance: 5,108; Referee: Georgia Ghirardello

5 January 2025 10	Sydney FC	1–1	Melbourne City	Sydney
17:00 AEDT	Johnson 29'	Report	McKenna 62'	Stadium: Leichhardt Oval; Attendance: 2,340; Referee: Rachael Mitchenson

11 January 2025 11	Melbourne City	2–0	Brisbane Roar	Melbourne
19:00 AEDT	McKenna 5', 9'	Report		Stadium: AAMI Park; Attendance: 2,340; Referee: Georgia Ghirardello

17 January 2025 12	Western United	1–1	Melbourne City	Melbourne
19:35 AEDT	Johnson 45'	Report	McNamara 83'	Stadium: Ironbark Fields; Attendance: 847; Referee: Caitlin Williams

25 January 2025 13	Western Sydney Wanderers	0–1	Melbourne City	Sydney
17:00 AEDT		Report	McNamara 14'	Stadium: Wanderers Football Park; Attendance: 634; Referee: Bec Mackie

1 February 2025 14	Melbourne City	1–1	Melbourne Victory	Melbourne
17:00 AEDT	Speckmaier 89'	Report	Lowe 5'	Stadium: ctrl:cyber Pitch; Attendance: 1,565; Referee: Caitlin Williams

5 February 2025 20	Melbourne City	5–1	Western United	Melbourne
17:00 AEDT	McNamara 3', 36', 38'; Pollicina 59'; Bosch 71'	Report	Logarzo 26'	Stadium: ctrl:cyber Pitch; Attendance: 326; Referee: Rebecca Durcau
Note: Match originally scheduled for 23 March at 16:00 AEDT, but rescheduled due to Melbourne City's participation in the 2024–25 AFC Women's Champions League. Match then rescheduled for 5 February, due to extreme heat forecast.

8 February 2025 15	Newcastle Jets	0–2	Melbourne City	Newcastle
19:45 AEDT		Report	Hughes 69'; McNamara 85'	Stadium: McDonald Jones Stadium; Attendance: 2,583; Referee: Molly Godsell

15 February 2025 16	Melbourne City	2–1	Sydney FC	Melbourne
19:45 AEDT	Speckmaier 46'; Henry 89'	Report	Hawkesby 13'	Stadium: AAMI Park; Attendance: 1,216; Referee: Isabella Mossin

1 March 2025 17	Canberra United	1–1	Melbourne City	Canberra
16:00 AEDT	Keane 81'	Report	Otto 52'	Stadium: McKellar Park; Attendance: 919; Referee: Rachael Mitchenson

16 March 2025 19	Melbourne City	4–3	Adelaide United	Melbourne
16:00 AEDT	McNamara 10', 27', 64'; León 41' (o.g.)	Report	Tonkin 33'; Healy 53'; Tolland 73'	Stadium: ctrl:cyber Pitch; Attendance: 323; Referee: Izzy Cooper

26 March 2025 18	Brisbane Roar	0–4	Melbourne City	Brisbane
18:00 AEST		Report	Otto 9'; McNamara 70'; Henry 89'; Speckmaier 90+5'	Stadium: Perry Park; Attendance: 1,174; Referee: Rachael Mitchenson
Note: Match originally scheduled for 9 March, but rescheduled due to the impacts from Cyclone Alfred.

30 March 2025 21	Wellington Phoenix	0–1	Melbourne City	Porirua
16:00 NZDT		Report	McNamara 35'	Stadium: Porirua Park; Attendance: 862; Referee: Bec Mackie

11 April 2025 22	Melbourne City	4–1	Newcastle Jets	Melbourne
16:50 AEST	McNamara 20', 33'; Pollicina 69'; Henry 71'	Report	Jackson 67'	Stadium: AAMI Park; Attendance: 2,257; Referee: Caitlin Williams

18 April 2025 23	Perth Glory	1–5	Melbourne City	Perth
19:00 AWST	Phonsongkham 12' (pen.)	Report	Otto 3', 26'; Henry 6'; McNamara 40'; L. McKenna 68'	Stadium: Sam Kerr Football Centre; Attendance: 1,402; Referee: Bec Mackie

==== Finals series ====
3 May 2025 Semi-final 1st leg	Central Coast Mariners	2–2	Melbourne City	Gosford
14:15 AEST	Nunn 20', 54'	Report	McKenna 29'; Henry 35'	Stadium: Industree Group Stadium; Attendance: 1,934; Referee: Georgia Ghirardello

11 May 2025 Semi-final 2nd leg	Melbourne City	0–1 (a.e.t.) (2–3 agg.)	Central Coast Mariners	Melbourne
17:00 AEST		Report	Gomez 120+1'	Stadium: ctrl:cyber Pitch; Attendance: 578; Referee: Molly Godsell

=== AFC Women's Champions League ===
==== Group stage ====
Pos	Team	Pld	W	D	L	GF	GA	GD	Pts	Qualification
1	(Australia) Melbourne City	3	3	0	0	9	1	+8	9	Advance to Quarter-finals
2	(Iran) Bam Khatoon	3	1	1	1	4	4	0	4	Advance to Quarter-finals
3	(Philippines) Kaya–Iloilo	3	0	2	1	1	5	−4	2	
4	(Thailand) College of Asian Scholars (H)	3	0	1	2	1	5	−4	1	

Source: AFC
Rules for classification: Tiebreakers
(H) Hosts

6 October 2024 Group stage	Melbourne City (Australia)	2–1	(Iran) Bam Khatoon	Pathum Thani, Thailand
16:00 UTC+7	Pollicina 40'; Speckmaier 43'	Report	Hamoudi 70'	Stadium: BG Stadium; Attendance: 391; Referee: Kim Yu-jeong (South Korea)

9 October 2024 Group stage	College of Asian Scholars (Thailand)	0–3	(Australia) Melbourne City	Pathum Thani, Thailand
20:00 UTC+7		Report	Speckmaier 16'; Vlajnic 51'; Bosch 67'	Stadium: BG Stadium; Attendance: 414; Referee: Yang Shu-ting (Chinese Taipei)

12 October 2024 Group stage	Melbourne City (Australia)	4–0	(Philippines) Kaya–Iloilo	Pathum Thani, Thailand
16:00 UTC+7	Speckmaier 4'; Stott 7'; Bosch 10', 38'	Report		Stadium: BG Stadium; Referee: Khuloud Khudoum (United Arab Emirates)

==== Knockout stage ====
23 March 2025 Quarter-final	Melbourne City (Australia)	3–0	(Chinese Taipei) Taichung Blue Whale	Melbourne, Australia
15:00 UTC+11	Speckmaier 4'; Li Pei-jung 43' (o.g.); McNamara 63' (pen.)	Report		Stadium: Melbourne Rectangular Stadium; Attendance: 1,865; Referee: Kim Yu-jeong (South Korea)

21 May 2025 Semi-final	Incheon Red Angels (South Korea)	0–1	(Australia) Melbourne City	Wuhan, China
20:00 UTC+8		Report	McMahon 90+4'	Stadium: Wuhan Sports Centre Stadium; Attendance: 706; Referee: Pansa Chaisanit (Thailand)

24 May 2025 Final	Melbourne City (Australia)	1–1 (a.e.t.) (4–5 p)	(China) Wuhan Jiangda	Wuhan, China
20:00 UTC+8	McMahon 76'	Report	Wang Shuang 90+8' (pen.)	Stadium: Wuhan Sports Centre Stadium; Attendance: 18,715; Referee: Asaka Koizumi (Japan)
	Penalties
	McMahon (penalty scored); McKenna (penalty scored); Otto (penalty scored); Speckmaier (penalty scored); Stott (penalty missed); Henry (penalty missed)		(penalty scored) Yao Wei; (penalty scored) Wu Haiyan; (penalty scored) Mengyi; (penalty missed) Song Duan; (penalty scored) Wang Shuang; (penalty scored) Zhao Yuxin

== Statistics ==
=== Appearances and goals ===
Includes all competitions. Players with no appearances not included in the list.

As of match played 24 May 2025

No.	Pos	Nat	Player	Total		A-League Women		A-League Women Finals		AFC Women's Champions League	
No.	Pos	Nat	Player	Apps	Goals	Apps	Goals	Apps	Goals	Apps	Goals
5	DF	(United States) USA	Taylor Otto	29	3	23	3	2	0	4	0
6	MF	(Australia) AUS	Leticia McKenna	31	6	19+4	5	2	1	4+2	0
7	FW	(Canada) CAN	Kathryn Harvey	15	3	6+9	3	0	0	0	0
8	DF	(Australia) AUS	Alexia Apostolakis	31	2	22+1	2	2	0	6	0
9	FW	(Australia) AUS	Holly McNamara	22	16	9+8	15	1+1	0	3	1
10	MF	(Australia) AUS	Rhianna Pollicina	27	5	11+11	4	0+1	0	4	1
11	FW	(Australia) AUS	Emilia Murray	9	0	0+4	0	0+1	0	0+4	0
12	MF	(Australia) AUS	Shelby McMahon	24	2	1+16	0	1+1	0	3+2	2
13	DF	(Australia) AUS	Rebekah Stott	28	1	20	0	2	0	6	1
14	MF	(Australia) AUS	Laura Hughes	30	4	23	4	2	0	5	0
15	MF	(Australia) AUS	Kiera Meyers	6	0	0+3	0	0	0	1+2	0
16	DF	(Australia) AUS	Karly Roestbakken	30	0	16+6	0	2	0	5+1	0
17	MF	(Venezuela) VEN	Mariana Speckmaier	28	11	20+1	7	0+1	0	5+1	4
18	MF	(Australia) AUS	Leah Davidson	27	0	18+2	0	2	0	4+1	0
19	MF	(Mexico) MEX	Lourdes Bosch	29	7	20+2	4	1	0	3+3	3
20	FW	(Australia) AUS	Caitlin Karic	5	0	0+2	0	0+1	0	0+2	0
22	FW	(Australia) AUS	Bryleeh Henry	26	5	11+8	4	2	1	4+1	0
23	GK	(Australia) AUS	Melissa Barbieri	4	0	1+2	0	0	0	1	0
24	GK	(Spain) ESP	Malena Mieres	29	0	22	0	2	0	5	0
27	DF	(Serbia) SRB	Tyla-Jay Vlajnic	27	2	8+12	1	1+1	0	3+2	1

- Source: Soccerway

=== Disciplinary record ===
Includes all competitions. The list is sorted by squad number when total cards are equal. Players with no cards not included in the list.

As of match played 11 May 2025

No.	Pos	Nat	Player	Total			A-League Women			A-League Women Finals			AFC Women's Champions League		
No.	Pos	Nat	Player	Yellow card	Second yellow card	Red card	Yellow card	Second yellow card	Red card	Yellow card	Second yellow card	Red card	Yellow card	Second yellow card	Red card
19	MF	(Mexico) MEX	Lourdes Bosch	4	0	1	4	0	0	0	0	1	0	0	0
8	DF	(Australia) AUS	Alexia Apostolakis	3	0	0	1	0	0	1	0	0	1	0	0
14	MF	(Australia) AUS	Laura Hughes	2	0	0	2	0	0	0	0	0	0	0	0
5	DF	(United States) USA	Taylor Otto	1	0	0	1	0	0	0	0	0	0	0	0
6	DF	(Australia) AUS	Leticia McKenna	1	0	0	1	0	0	0	0	0	0	0	0
7	FW	(Canada) CAN	Kathryn Harvey	1	0	0	1	0	0	0	0	0	0	0	0
9	FW	(Australia) AUS	Holly McNamara	1	0	0	1	0	0	0	0	0	0	0	0
13	DF	(New Zealand) NZL	Rebekah Stott	1	0	0	1	0	0	0	0	0	0	0	0
16	DF	(Australia) AUS	Karly Roestbakken	1	0	0	1	0	0	0	0	0	0	0	0
17	MF	(Venezuela) VEN	Mariana Speckmaier	1	0	0	1	0	0	0	0	0	0	0	0
27	DF	(Serbia) SRB	Tyla-Jay Vlajnic	1	0	0	1	0	0	0	0	0	0	0	0

- Source: Soccerway
- (yellow card) = Number of bookings; (second yellow card) = Number of sending offs after a second yellow card; (red card) = Number of sending offs by a direct red card.

=== Clean sheets ===
Includes all competitions. The list is sorted by squad number when total clean sheets are equal. Numbers in parentheses represent games where both goalkeepers participated and both kept a clean sheet; the number in parentheses is awarded to the goalkeeper who was substituted on, whilst a full clean sheet is awarded to the goalkeeper who was on the field at the start of play. Goalkeepers with no clean sheets not included in the list.

As of match played 24 May 2025

Rank	No.	Nat.	Goalkeeper	A-League Women	A-League Women Finals	AFC Women's Champions League	Total
1	24	(Spain)	Malena Mieres	7	0	3	10
2	23	(Australia)	Melissa Barbieri	0	0	1	1
Total				7	0	4	11

== See also ==
- 2024–25 Melbourne City FC season
