= 2025–26 Melbourne City FC (women) season =

11th season in existence of Melbourne City FC (women)

Melbourne City
2025–26 season
- Owner: City Football Group
- Chairman: Khaldoon Al Mubarak
- Head coach: Michael Matricciani
- Stadium: ctrl:cyber Pitch; AAMI Park (doubleheaders)
- A-League Women: 1st
- A-League Women Finals: Champions
- AFC Women's Champions League: Semi-finals
- Top goalscorer: League: Holly McNamara (12); All: Holly McNamara (18)
- Highest home attendance: 1,937 vs. Perth Glory (28 December 2025); A-League Women
- Lowest home attendance: 211 vs. Central Coast Mariners (8 November 2025); A-League Women
- Average home league attendance: 928
- Biggest win: 7–0 vs. Stallion Laguna (N) (16 November 2025); AFC Women's Champions League
- Biggest defeat: 1–3 vs. Newcastle Jets (H) (16 January 2026); A-League Women
Home colours	Away colours	Third colours
- All statistics correct as of 16 May 2026.

The 2025–26 season was Melbourne City Football Club's eleventh season in the A-League Women. They also participated in the AFC Women's Champions League for the second time.

== Players ==
=== First-team squad ===
Note: Flags indicate national team as defined under FIFA eligibility rules; some limited exceptions apply. Players may hold more than one non-FIFA nationality.

No.	Pos.	Nation	Player
1	GK	AUS	Dali Gorr-Burchmore
2	DF	ENG	Ellie Wilson
3	DF	ENG	Danielle Turner
5	DF	USA	Taylor Otto
6	MF	AUS	Leticia McKenna
7	MF	AUS	Danella Butrus
8	MF	AUS	Alexia Apostolakis
9	FW	AUS	Holly McNamara
10	FW	AUS	Izabella Rako
11	FW	NZL	Deven Jackson
12	MF	AUS	Shelby McMahon
13	DF	NZL	Rebekah Stott (captain)

No.	Pos.	Nation	Player
14	MF	WAL	Laura Hughes
15	FW	NGR	Chinaza Uchendu
16	DF	AUS	Karly Roestbakken
17	MF	AUS	Kaya Jugovic
18	MF	AUS	Leah Davidson
19	DF	AUS	Keira Sarris
20	FW	AUS	Caitlin Karic
21	FW	AUS	Aideen Keane
22	FW	AUS	Bryleeh Henry
23	GK	AUS	Melissa Barbieri
24	GK	ESP	Malena Mieres
25	GK	AUS	Ayana Aoyagi

== Transfers ==
=== Transfers in ===
No.	Position	Player	Transferred from	Type/fee	Contract length	Date	Ref.
3	DF	(England) Danielle Turner	(England) Aston Villa	Free transfer	2 years	14 August 2025	
21	FW	Aideen Keane	Canberra United	Free transfer	1 year	25 August 2025	
11	FW	(New Zealand) Deven Jackson	Newcastle Jets	Free transfer	1 year	28 August 2025	
15	FW	(Nigeria) Chinaza Uchendu	(France) Nantes	Free transfer	1 year	18 September 2025	
2	DF	(England) Ellie Wilson	Unattached	Free transfer	1 year	19 September 2025	
1	GK	Dali Gorr-Burchmore	(Australia) South Melbourne	Free transfer	1 year	25 September 2025	
7	MF	Danella Butrus	(Australia) Bulleen Lions	Free transfer	1 year	25 September 2025	
17	MF	Kaya Jugovic	(Australia) Football Victoria Academy	Free transfer	2 years	25 September 2025	
19	DF	Keira Sarris	(Australia) Football Victoria Academy	Free transfer	1 year	25 September 2025	
25	GK	Ayana Aoyagi	(Australia) South Melbourne	Free transfer	1 year	25 September 2025	

==== From academy squad ====
N	Pos.	Nat.	Name	Age	Notes
10	FW	(Australia)	Izabella Rako	16	two-year contract

=== Transfers out ===
No.	Position	Player	Transferred to	Type/fee	Date	Ref.
10	MF	Rhianna Pollicina	Unattached	End of contract	5 June 2025	
1	GK	Sophia Varley	Unattached	End of contract	17 June 2025	
7	FW	(Canada) Kathryn Harvey	Unattached	End of contract	17 June 2025	
17	FW	(Venezuela) Mariana Speckmaier	(England) Durham	Undisclosed	13 August 2025	
19	MF	(Mexico) Lourdes Bosch	(United States) Denver Summit	Undisclosed	22 August 2025	
15	MF	Kiera Meyers	Brisbane Roar	End of contract	4 September 2025	
11	MF	Emilia Makris	Unattached	Mutual contract termination	5 September 2025	
21	MF	Isabella Accardo	Unattached	End of contract	5 September 2025	
27	DF	(Serbia) Tyla-Jay Vlajnic	Unattached	End of contract	5 September 2025	

=== Contract extensions ===
No.	Player	Position	Duration	Date	Ref.
5	(United States) Taylor Otto	Centre-back	1 year	18 June 2025	
24	(Spain) Malena Mieres	Goalkeeper	1 year	20 June 2025	
13	(New Zealand) Rebekah Stott	Defender	2 years	27 June 2025	
9	Holly McNamara	Forward	1 year	30 June 2025	
6	Leticia McKenna	Midfielder	2 years	4 July 2025	
18	Leah Davidson	Midfielder	2 years	22 July 2025	
20	Caitlin Karic	Forward	1 year	5 September 2025	
23	Melissa Barbieri	Goalkeeper	1 year	12 September 2025	
7	Danella Butrus	Midfielder	1 year	5 December 2025	Contract extended from end of 2025–26 to end of 2026–27

== Pre-season and friendlies ==
11 October 2025	Melbourne Victory (Australia)	4–1	(Australia) Melbourne City	Melbourne, Australia
	Flannery 4' (?); Lowe 43'; White 60'	Report	McKenna (?)	Stadium: The Home of the Matildas

16 October 2025	Melbourne City (Australia)	0–1	(Australia) Adelaide United	Melbourne, Australia
		Report	Blieschke 50'	Stadium: The Home of the Matildas; Attendance: 0 (behind closed doors)
Note: Played across two 40-minute halves

== Competitions ==
=== Overall record ===
Competition	First match	Last match	Starting round	Final position	Record							
Competition	First match	Last match	Starting round	Final position	Pld	W	D	L	GF	GA	GD	Win %
A-League Women	1 November 2025	5 April 2026	Matchday 1	1st	20	12	4	4	36	20	+16	60.00
A-League Women Finals	2 May 2026	16 May 2026	Semi-finals	Champions	3	3	0	0	5	1	+4	100.00
AFC Women's Champions League	13 November 2025	20 May 2026	Group stage	Semi-final	5	4	0	1	18	4	+14	80.00
Total					28	19	4	5	59	25	+34	67.86

Last updated: 20 May 2026
Source: Competitions

=== A-League Women ===
==== League table ====
Pos	Team	Pld	W	D	L	GF	GA	GD	Pts	Qualification
1	Melbourne City (C)	20	12	4	4	36	20	+16	40	Qualification for AFC Women's Champions League and Finals series
2	Wellington Phoenix (Note: Wellington Phoenix cannot qualify for the AFC Women's Champions League as they are based in New Zealand, which is part of the Oceania Football Confederation.)	20	10	4	6	38	17	+21	34	Qualification for Finals series
3	Canberra United	20	9	4	7	30	24	+6	31	Qualification for Finals series
4	Brisbane Roar	20	9	4	7	37	39	−2	31	Qualification for Finals series
5	Adelaide United	20	9	3	8	24	26	−2	30	Qualification for Finals series

Source: A-Leagues
Rules for classification: 1) points; 2) goal difference; 3) goals scored; 4) wins; 5) head-to-head results; 5a) head-to-head points; 5b) head-to-head goal difference; 6) Fair Play points; 7) away goal difference; 8) away goals per match; 9) home goal difference; 10) home goals per match; 11) toss of a coin in an event of a tie of two clubs.
(C) Champions

==== Results summary ====
Overall								Home						Away					
Pld	W	D	L	GF	GA	GD	Pts	W	D	L	GF	GA	GD	W	D	L	GF	GA	GD
20	12	4	4	36	20	+16	40	7	1	2	20	9	+11	5	3	2	16	11	+5

Last updated: 5 April 2026.
Source: A-Leagues

==== Results by round ====
Round	1	2	3	4	5	6	7	8	9	10	11	12	13	14	15	16	17	18	19	20	21	22
Ground	A	H	B	H	H	H	A	A	H	H	H	A	H	A	A	H	A	A	H	A	B	A
Result	D	W	B	D	L	W	L	D	W	W	W	W	L	W	L	W	D	W	W	W	B	W
Position	5	2	4	6	6	4	7	9	3	4	2	1	1	1	1	1	1	1	1	1	1	1

Updated to match(es) played on 5 April 2026. Source: A-Leagues
A = Away; H = Home; B = Bye; W = Win; D = Draw; L = Loss; P = Postponed

==== Matches ====
Win Draw Loss

1 November 2025 1	Sydney FC	2–2	Melbourne City	Sydney
14:15 AEDT	Stott 20' (o.g.); Hawkesby 62'	Report	McMahon 45+1'; Keane 75'	Stadium: Leichhardt Oval; Attendance: 3,013; Referee: Molly Godsell

8 November 2025 2	Melbourne City	4–0	Central Coast Mariners	Melbourne
15:00 AEDT	McMahon 46', 71'; McNamara 32', 54' (pen.)	Report		Stadium: ctrl:cyber Pitch; Attendance: 211; Referee: Caitlin Williams

7 December 2025 6	Melbourne City	1–0	Wellington Phoenix	Melbourne
15:00 AEDT	Stott 86'	Report		Stadium: ctrl:cyber Pitch; Attendance: 619; Referee: Shab Roshan

13 December 2025 7	Canberra United	2–1	Melbourne City	Canberra
17:30 AEDT	Hawkins 52'; Heyman 59'	Report	McNamara 71' (pen.)	Stadium: McKellar Park; Attendance: 978; Referee: Jock Quartermain

23 December 2025 10	Melbourne City	2–1	Melbourne Victory	Melbourne
16:30 AEDT	Bunge 65' (o.g.); McNamara 84'	Report	Pollicina 32'	Stadium: AAMI Park; Attendance: 1,323; Referee: Georgia Ghirardello

28 December 2025 9	Melbourne City	3–1	Perth Glory	Melbourne
16:15 AEDT	McNamara 23', 45+3', 71'	Report	Trew 50'	Stadium: AAMI Park; Attendance: 1,937; Referee: Bec Mackie

4 January 2026 11	Melbourne City	1–0	Sydney FC	Melbourne
17:00 AEDT	Uchendu 52'	Report		Stadium: ctrl:cyber Pitch; Attendance: 972; Referee: Georgia Ghirardello

10 January 2026 12	Wellington Phoenix	1–2	Melbourne City	Porirua
16:00 NZDT	Woods 90'	Report	McKenna 16'; Keane 21'	Stadium: Porirua Park; Attendance: 1,301; Referee: Anna-Marie Keighley

16 January 2026 13	Melbourne City	1–3	Newcastle Jets	Melbourne
16:50 AEDT	McNamara 41' (pen.)	Report	Brown 32'; Copus-Brown 66'; Lancaster 71'	Stadium: AAMI Park; Attendance: 1,909; Referee: Page Malau-Aduli

20 January 2026 8	Brisbane Roar	1–1	Melbourne City	Brisbane
19:00 AEST	Miller 87'	Report	McNamara 42' (pen.)	Stadium: Spencer Park; Attendance: 688; Referee: Izzy Cooper
Note: The match was rescheduled due to Melbourne City's participation in the 2025–26 AFC Women's Champions League.

24 January 2026 14	Perth Glory	0–2	Melbourne City	Perth
17:00 AWST		Report	McNamara 20', 72'	Stadium: Sam Kerr Football Centre; Attendance: 856; Referee: Georgia Ghirardello

31 January 2026 15	Adelaide United	2–1	Melbourne City	Adelaide
16:00 ACDT	Worts 9'; Tonkin 49'	Report	McKenna 65'	Stadium: Coopers Stadium; Attendance: 654; Referee: Tom Brinkworth
Note: Due to forecasted heat, the match was postponed from its original date 30 January 2026.

4 February 2026 5	Melbourne City	0–1	Western Sydney Wanderers	Melbourne
17:30 AEDT		Report	Keane 35' (o.g.)	Stadium: ctrl:cyber Pitch; Attendance: 520; Referee: Caitlin Williams

8 February 2026 16	Melbourne City	5–2	Brisbane Roar	Melbourne
17:00 AEDT	Stott 36'; McNamara 41'; Henry 48'; Jackson 69'; Keane 82'	Report	Stephenson 8', 13'	Stadium: ctrl:cyber Pitch; Attendance: 547; Referee: Isabella Mossin

15 February 2026 17	Melbourne Victory	0–0	Melbourne City	Melbourne
17:00 AEDT		Report		Stadium: Home of the Matildas; Attendance: 1,566; Referee: Sophie Allum

20 February 2026 18	Central Coast Mariners	1–3	Melbourne City	Gosford
19:00 AEDT	Gomez 77'	Report	Henry 52'; Stott 68'; Keane 74'	Stadium: Polytec Stadium; Attendance: 1,003; Referee: Lara Lee

15 March 2026 19	Melbourne City	3–1	Canberra United	Melbourne
14:00 AEDT	Keane 61'; Uchendu 83', 87'	Report	Gordon 85'	Stadium: ctrl:cyber Pitch; Attendance: 595; Referee: Isabella Mossin

18 March 2026 4	Melbourne City	0–0	Adelaide United	Melbourne
16:30 AEDT		Report		Stadium: ctrl:cyber Pitch; Attendance: 651; Referee: Caitlin Williams
Note: Due to an outbreak of influenza A within the Adelaide United squad, the match was postponed from its original date 17 December 2025.

22 March 2026 20	Western Sydney Wanderers	1–2	Melbourne City	Sydney
16:00 AEDT	Younis 53'	Report	McKenna 24'; Henry 45'	Stadium: Wanderers Football Park; Attendance: 682; Referee: Izzy Cooper

5 April 2026 22	Newcastle Jets	1–2	Melbourne City	Maitland
16:00 AEST	Ayres 47'	Report	Keane 72'; Turner 90+7'	Stadium: Maitland Regional Sportsground; Attendance: 852; Referee: Mikayla Ryan

==== Finals series ====
2 May 2026 Semi-final 1st leg	Melbourne Victory	0–1	Melbourne City	Melbourne
17:00 AEST		Report	McKenna 45'	Stadium: AAMI Park; Attendance: 4,953; Referee: Sophie Allum

9 May 2026 Semi-final 2nd leg	Melbourne City	1–0 (2–0 agg.)	Melbourne Victory	Melbourne
14:00 AEST	McMahon 34'	Report		Stadium: ctrl:cyber Pitch; Attendance: 1,607; Referee: Mikayla Ryan

16 May 2026 Grand final	Melbourne City	3–1	Wellington Phoenix	Melbourne
16:15 AEST	McNamara 41', 43'; McKenna 49'	Report	Woods 52'	Stadium: AAMI Park; Attendance: 7,174; Referee: Isabella Mossin

=== AFC Women's Champions League ===
==== Group stage ====
Pos	Team	Pld	W	D	L	GF	GA	GD	Pts	Qualification
1	(Australia) Melbourne City	3	3	0	0	15	0	+15	9	Advance to knockout stage
2	(Vietnam) Hồ Chí Minh City (H)	3	2	0	1	3	3	0	6	Advance to knockout stage
3	(Philippines) Stallion Laguna	3	1	0	2	5	8	−3	3	Advance to knockout stage
4	(Singapore) Lion City Sailors	3	0	0	3	0	12	−12	0	

Source: AFC
Rules for classification: Tiebreakers
(H) Hosts

13 November 2025 Group stage	Melbourne City (Australia)	5–0	(Singapore) Lion City Sailors	Ho Chi Minh City, Vietnam
15:00 ICT	McNamara 12' (pen.), 45+1' (pen.); Apostolakis 55'; Butrus 58'; Qasimah 73' (o.g.)	Report		Stadium: Thống Nhất Stadium; Attendance: 512; Referee: Oh Hyeon-jeong (South Korea)

16 November 2025 Group stage	Stallion Laguna (Philippines)	0–7	(Australia) Melbourne City	Ho Chi Minh City, Vietnam
15:00 ICT		Report	Keane 5'; Davidson 9'; McKenna 40' (pen.), 45+2'; Jackson 67', 90'; Butrus 72'	Stadium: Thống Nhất Stadium; Attendance: 323; Referee: Asaka Koizumi (Japan)

19 November 2025 Group stage	Hồ Chí Minh City (Vietnam)	0–3	(Australia) Melbourne City	Ho Chi Minh City, Vietnam
19:00 ICT		Report	McNamara 1'; Apostolakis 4'; McMahon 40'	Stadium: Thống Nhất Stadium; Attendance: 726; Referee: Dong Fangyu (China)

==== Knockout stage ====
29 March 2026 Quarter-final	Melbourne City (Australia)	2–1	(Uzbekistan) Nasaf	Melbourne, Australia
15:00 AEDT	McNamara 38'; Uchendu 89'	Report	Mamatkarimova 42'	Stadium: The Home of The Matildas; Attendance: 572; Referee: Yoshimi Yamashita (Japan)

20 May 2026 Semi-final	Melbourne City (Australia)	1–3	(Japan) Tokyo Verdy Beleza	Suwon, South Korea
14:00 UTC+9	Keane 37'	Report	Shiokoshi 4', 78'; Shinjo 10'	Stadium: Suwon Sports Complex; Attendance: 1,362; Referee: Tian Jin (China)

== Statistics ==
=== Appearances and goals ===
Players with no appearances are not included in the list.

As of match played 20 May 2026

No.	Pos	Nat	Player	Total		A-League Women		A-League Women Finals		AFC Women's Champions League	
No.	Pos	Nat	Player	Apps	Goals	Apps	Goals	Apps	Goals	Apps	Goals
2	DF	(England) ENG	Ellie Wilson	8	0	0+8	0	0	0	0	0
3	DF	(England) ENG	Danielle Turner	28	1	20	1	3	0	5	0
5	DF	(United States) USA	Taylor Otto	28	0	20	0	3	0	5	0
6	MF	(Australia) AUS	Leticia McKenna	28	7	18+2	3	3	2	5	2
7	MF	(Australia) AUS	Danella Butrus	20	2	7+8	0	0	0	1+4	2
8	DF	(Australia) AUS	Alexia Apostolakis	25	2	15+4	0	0+3	0	3	2
9	FW	(Australia) AUS	Holly McNamara	25	18	15+2	12	3	2	5	4
10	FW	(Australia) AUS	Izabella Rako	2	0	0+1	0	0	0	0+1	0
11	FW	(New Zealand) NZL	Deven Jackson	23	3	10+8	1	0+3	0	0+2	2
12	MF	(Australia) AUS	Shelby McMahon	22	5	12+2	3	3	1	4+1	1
13	DF	(New Zealand) NZL	Rebekah Stott	27	3	19	3	3	0	5	0
14	MF	(Wales) WAL	Laura Hughes	15	0	4+3	0	0+3	0	5	0
15	FW	(Nigeria) NGR	Chinaza Uchendu	21	4	9+8	3	0	0	0+4	1
16	DF	(Australia) AUS	Karly Roestbakken	22	0	10+6	0	3	0	2+1	0
17	MF	(Australia) AUS	Kaya Jugovic	4	0	0+2	0	0	0	0+2	0
18	MF	(Australia) AUS	Leah Davidson	22	1	12+2	0	3	0	4+1	1
19	DF	(Australia) AUS	Keira Sarris	1	0	0	0	0	0	0+1	0
20	FW	(Australia) AUS	Caitlin Karic	7	1	0+4	0	0	0	0+3	1
21	FW	(Australia) AUS	Aideen Keane	28	7	18+2	5	3	0	5	2
22	FW	(Australia) AUS	Bryleeh Henry	19	4	10+4	4	3	0	1+1	0
23	GK	(Australia) AUS	Melissa Barbieri	3	0	1	0	0	0	1+1	0
24	GK	(Spain) ESP	Malena Mieres	26	0	19	0	3	0	4	0

- Source: Soccerway

=== Disciplinary record ===
As of match played 20 May 2026

No.	Pos	Nat	Player	Total			A-League Women			A-League Women Finals			AFC Women's Champions League		
No.	Pos	Nat	Player	Yellow card	Second yellow card	Red card	Yellow card	Second yellow card	Red card	Yellow card	Second yellow card	Red card	Yellow card	Second yellow card	Red card
22	FW	(Australia) AUS	Bryleeh Henry	3	0	0	3	0	0	0	0	0	0	0	0
5	DF	(United States) USA	Taylor Otto	2	0	0	2	0	0	0	0	0	0	0	0
8	DF	(Australia) AUS	Alexia Apostolakis	2	0	0	2	0	0	0	0	0	0	0	0
12	MF	(Australia) AUS	Shelby McMahon	2	0	0	2	0	0	0	0	0	0	0	0
21	FW	(Australia) AUS	Aideen Keane	2	0	0	1	0	0	1	0	0	0	0	0
3	DF	(England) ENG	Danielle Turner	1	0	0	0	0	0	0	0	0	1	0	0
6	MF	(Australia) AUS	Leticia McKenna	1	0	0	0	0	0	0	0	0	1	0	0
9	FW	(Australia) AUS	Holly McNamara	1	0	0	0	0	0	1	0	0	0	0	0
15	MF	(Nigeria) NGR	Chinaza Uchendu	1	0	1	1	0	1	0	0	0	0	0	0
11	MF	(New Zealand) NZL	Deven Jackson	1	0	0	1	0	0	0	0	0	0	0	0
18	MF	(Australia) AUS	Leah Davidson	1	0	0	1	0	0	0	0	0	0	0	0

- Source: Soccerway
- (yellow card) = Number of bookings; (second yellow card) = Number of sending offs after a second yellow card; (red card) = Number of sending offs by a direct red card.

=== Clean sheets ===
As of match played 20 May 2026

Numbers in parentheses represent games where both goalkeepers participated and kept a clean sheet; the number in parentheses is awarded to the goalkeeper who was substituted on, whilst a full clean sheet is awarded to the goalkeeper who was on the field at the start of play.

Rank	No.	Nat.	Goalkeeper	A-League Women	A-League Women Finals	AFC Women's Champions League	Total
1	24	(Spain)	Malena Mieres	6	2	2	10
2	23	(Australia)	Melissa Barbieri	0	0	1(1)	2
Total				6	2	4	12

== See also ==
- 2025–26 Melbourne City FC season
