= Rhianna Pollicina =

Australian soccer player (born 2005)

Personal information
- Date of birth: 9 February 1997 (age 29)
- Place of birth: Sydney, New South Wales, Australia
- Position: Midfielder

Team information
- Current team: Western Sydney Wanderers
- Number: 10

Youth career
- Football NSW Institute

Senior career*
Years	Team	Apps	(Gls)
2014–2015	Western Sydney Wanderers	5	(0)
2015–2016	NWS Spirit		
2016–2017	Marconi Stallions		
2017–2020	Blacktown Spartans		
2020	APIA Tigers		
2020–2021	Newcastle Jets	11	(2)
2021–2025	Melbourne City	81	(28)
2024–	Box Hill United		
2025–2026	Melbourne Victory	22	(7)
2026–	Western Sydney Wanderers	0	(0)

Managerial career
- Box Hill United
- * Club domestic league appearances and goals as of 27 August 2026

Rhianna Pollicina (/riˈænə ˌpɒlɪˈtʃiːnə/ ree-AN-ə POL-ih-CHEE-nə, Italian: [polliˈtʃiːna]; born 9 February 1997), nicknamed Mini, is an Australian soccer player-coach and former futsal player who plays as a midfielder for A-League Women club Western Sydney Wanderers and for National Premier Leagues Victoria Women's (NPL Victoria Women) club Box Hill United (which she also captains and assistant manages).

Pollicina previously played for National Premier Leagues NSW Women's clubs North West Sydney Spirit, Marconi Stallions, Blacktown Spartans and APIA Tigers, and for A-League clubs Western Sydney Wanderers, Newcastle Jets, Melbourne City, and Melbourne Victory. She is particularly remembered for her time at Melbourne City, where she is regarded as a club legend and one of their greatest players of all time, having made 85 appearances and scored 29 goals for the club in all competitions between 2021 and 2025.

== Early life ==
Pollicina was born on 9 February 1997 in Sydney to an Italian Australian family. Her grandmother (who she calls "Nonna") was born in Italy and migrated to Australia, and thus her family support the Italy national football team.

Pollicina attended Westfields Sports High School and played youth soccer for the Football NSW Institute.

== Club career ==
Beginning her career in the W-League at Western Sydney Wanderers, she moved to the National Premier Leagues NSW Women's (NPL NSW Women's), where she played from 2015 until 2021, with spells at North West Sydney Spirit, Marconi Stallions, Blacktown Spartans and APIA Tigers before returning to the W-League to play for Newcastle Jets.

Pollicina also previously played futsal, which she says greatly helped her development. In 2019, she scored 106 goals in a single season for Inner West Magic in the NSW Futsal Premier League Women's Open (NSW FPL Women's Open), becoming the first female player to ever score over 100 goals in one league season. Having previously represented Australia as a youth international in futsal, having played in a World Cup tournament where Australia finished runners-up to the United States, she was offered the opportunity to play for the senior national futsal team, though declined due to a conflict schedule with the A-League Women season.

=== Newcastle Jets ===
After spending five years in the National Premier Leagues NSW Women's (NPL NSW Women's), Pollicina joined W-League side Newcastle Jets.

On 7 February 2021, Pollicina emphatically scored her first W-League goal, scoring in a 4–2 loss to Melbourne Victory, the club she would later sign for in 2025, at Latrobe City Stadium in the town of Morwell in Victoria's Gippsland region. The goal was awarded Goal of the Round for round seven of the 2020–21 season.

On 8 March 2021, Pollicina scored her second goal of the season in a 4–0 away win over bottom of the table Perth Glory (who accumulated just one point over the entire season) at Dorrien Gardens in West Perth. The Jets ended the season finishing second last with just seven points, with this match being one of only two wins in the entire season and their only win away from home in the entire season.

At the end of season awards ceremony, Pollicina was awarded as Newcastle Jets' W-League Player of the Year, having been nominated alongside Tara Andrews and Sunny Franco.

=== Melbourne City ===
Pollicina signed for Melbourne City ahead of the 2021–22 season. She made her debut for the club on 3 December 2021 in the club's opening fixture, a 1–0 away win over Canberra United at Viking Park in Wanniassa. She later scored her first goal for the club on 18 December 2021 in a 3–1 home win over Adelaide United at Melbourne Rectangular Stadium. She finished the season with seven goals (including a midseason run of goals in four consecutive matches) and three assists in 16 matches (all of which she started in), more goals than any other City player except New Zealand striker Hannah Wilkinson with 14 goals in 14 appearances, and sixth overall in the Golden Boot rankings. She also ended the season with two PFA Player of the Month awards from January and February as well as the Coaches' Player of the Year Award at the end of season awards ceremony.

Ahead of the 2022–23 season, Pollicina extended her contract with Melbourne City. She once again enjoyed a fast start to the season, scoring her first ever brace for the club in the opening round on 20 November 2022 in a 4–1 away win over Wellington Phoenix at Wellington Regional Stadium in Pipitea. During the season, she also scored her first ever goal in the finals series on 15 April 2023, having scored in City's elimination final against Melbourne Derby rivals (and in the future her own club) Melbourne Victory at Casey Fields in Cranbourne East. As the match ended in a 3–3 after extra time, the match was decided by a penalty shootout, which Victory won 4–1, with Pollicina being the only one of City's three penalty takers to have scored. Finishing the season with 10 goals in 18 matches (17 of which she started), she was crowned Melbourne City Golden Boot winner for the season.

Ahead of the 2023–24 season, Pollicina extended her contract once again, extending alongside teammates Leah Davidson and Holly McNamara, with the trio extending until 2025. Her first goal of the season came in the second match of the season on 21 October 2023 against Canberra United in a 2–1 home win at Melbourne Rectangular Stadium, in which she scored a brace. City finished the regular season top of the table and were thus crowned that season's premiers and qualified for the AFC Women's Champions League (AWCL), but were not crowned champions as they lost the grand final 1–0 at home to regular season runners-up Sydney FC on 4 May 2024 at Melbourne Rectangular Stadium. She finished the season with six goals in 21 matches (20 of which she started in).

On 6 October 2024, Pollicina scored Melbourne City's first ever Champions League goal, having opened the scoring in a 2–1 group stage win over Iranian side Bam Khatoon at True BG Stadium in Pathum Thani, Thailand. Her first league goal of the 2024–25 season came once again in the opening match on 3 November 2024, scoring a brace in a 5–2 home win over Perth Glory at City Football Academy in Cranbourne East. However, due to a lack of consistency in her goalscoring, she was dropped from the starting lineup and became a substitute player. City would go on to finish runners-up to Chinese side Wuhan Jiangda in the Champions League (losing on penalties following a 1–1 draw after extra time in the final at Wuhan Sports Center in Wuhan, China), and while once again winning the A-League premiership (this time doing so unbeaten throughout the entire regular season) and thus again qualifying for the Champions League, City again failed to win the championship after being shockingly eliminated in the semi-finals by eventual winners Central Coast Mariners with an aggregate score of 3–2 over two legs. Pollicina herself finished the season with five goals in 27 matches (though she only started 15 of those matches).

Pollicina left Melbourne City in before the beginning of the 2025–26 season, leaving with a total of 85 caps and 29 goals, the second most of any women's player in the club's history.

=== Box Hill United ===
Pollicina signed for National Premier Leagues Victoria Women (NPL Victoria Women) club Box Hill United in June 2024 during the A-League Women off-season, which was midseason for the NPLW.

In the 2025 season, having been given the role of assistant manager, Pollicina led Box Hill United to win the grand final.

=== Melbourne Victory ===
Following her departure from Melbourne City, despite interest from clubs in Sweden and the United States, Pollicina remained in the A-League Women and signed for City's cross-city arch-rivals Melbourne Victory ahead of the 2025–26 season.

Pollicina made her debut for Melbourne Victory on 1 November 2025 in Victory's opening match of the 2025–26 season away to Brisbane Roar at Spencer Park in Newmarket. Pollicina scored Victory's first goal and equaliser in the 34th minute, with American striker Kennedy White giving Victory the lead in the 41st minute, though it was not enough with the Roar coming back to win 3–2.

Pollicina scored against her former club Newcastle Jets on 19 December 2025 in a 3–1 away win at Newcastle Number 2 Sports Ground in Newcastle West, then scored against her other former club Melbourne City in a 2–1 Melbourne Derby away loss at Melbourne Rectangular Stadium on 23 December 2025. She also scored in the 91st minute of an iconic 3–3 away draw with Central Coast Mariners at Central Coast Stadium in Gosford, in which Melbourne Victory were down 3–0 in the 90th minute before scoring thrice in second half stoppage time. In August 2026, the club announced her departure.

=== Western Sydney Wanderers ===
In September 2026, Pollicina returned to Western Sydney Wanderers.

== Managerial career ==
In addition to being a soccer player, Pollicina has also been a soccer coach since she was 14 years old, and received her C-license in 2025. She works with Brighton Grammar School in the Melbourne suburb of Brighton and is an assistant coach for her National Premier Leagues Victoria Women (NPL Victoria Women) side Box Hill United, who she also captains. In 2025, the club won the NPL Victoria Women championship.

== Personal life ==
Pollicina's best friend is former Melbourne City teammate and now Melbourne Derby rival Holly McNamara, with both look in up to and admiring each other. During her time at Melbourne City, she and McNamara shared a house with teammates Bryleeh Henry and Caitlin Karić, and went viral for a day in the life vlog posted on the club's social media pages, which was filmed, produced and edited by then-teammate Kaitlyn Torpey.
