= 2025 AFC Women's Champions League final =

Football match

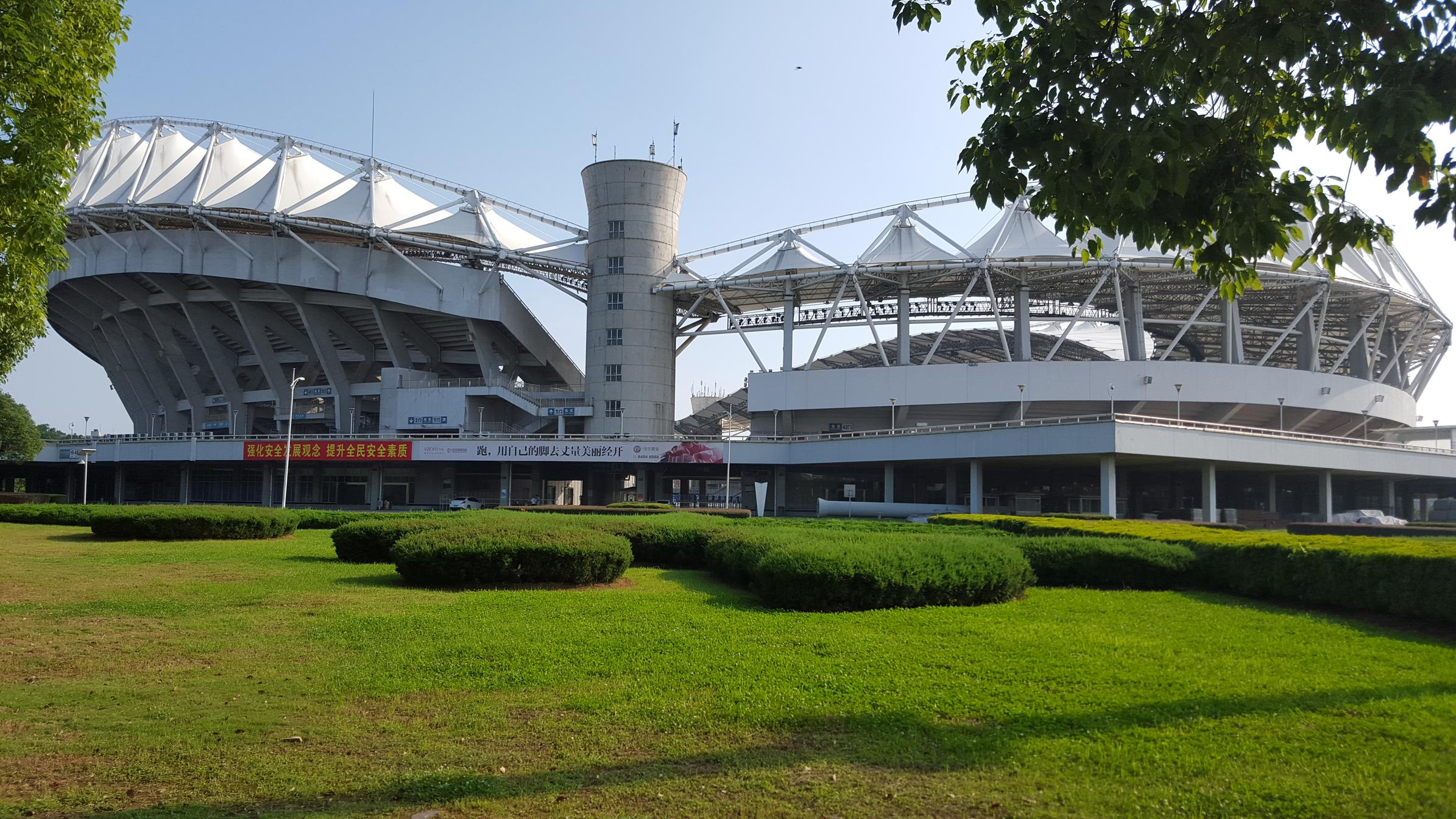
- The Wuhan Sports Centre Stadium in Wuhan hosted the final
- Event: 2024–25 AFC Women's Champions League
| Melbourne City | Wuhan Jiangda |
| (Australia) | (China) |
| 1 | 1 |
- After extra time Wuhan Jiangda won 5–4 on penalties
- Date: 24 May 2025
- Venue: Wuhan Sports Centre Stadium, Wuhan
- Referee: Asaka Koizumi (Japan)
- Attendance: 18,715
- Weather: Overcast night 68 °F (20 °C); 74% humidity

The 2025 AFC Women's Champions League final was the final match of the 2024–25 AFC Women's Champions League, the 5th season of Asia's premier club women's football tournament organised by the Asian Football Confederation (AFC), and the first since it was rebranded as the AFC Women's Champions League. It was played on 24 May 2025 in Wuhan. between local club Wuhan Jiangda (Chinese Women's Super League champions) and Australian side Melbourne City (A-League Women premiers), both of whom reached a continental final for the first time.

Wuhan Jiangda qualified for the inaugural FIFA Women's Champions Cup to be held in 2026.

== Teams ==
| Team | Region (Federation) | Previous finals appearances |
|---|---|---|
| (Australia) Melbourne City | East (AFF) | None |
| (China) Wuhan Jiangda | East (EAFF) | None |

== Venue ==
The semi-final and final venue was pre-determined, with the match played in Wuhan, Hubei Province, PR China.

== Route to the final ==
| Wuhan Jiangda (China) | | Round | (Australia) Melbourne City | |
|---|---|---|---|---|
| Opponent | Result | Group stage | Opponent | Result |
| (United Arab Emirates) Abu Dhabi Country Club | 1–2 | Matchday 1 | (Iran) Bam Khatoon | 2–1 |
| (Malaysia) Sabah | 7–0 | Matchday 2 | (Thailand) College of Asian Scholars | 3–0 |
| (South Korea) Incheon Red Angels | 0–2 | Matchday 3 | (Philippines) Kaya–Iloilo | 4–0 |
| Group A Third place: Pos / Team / Pld / Pts; 1 / (South Korea) Incheon Red Angels / 3 / 7; 2 / (United Arab Emirates) Abu Dhabi Country Club / 3 / 5; 3 / (China) Wuhan Jiangda (H) / 3 / 3; 4 / (Malaysia) Sabah / 3 / 1; Source: AFC (H) Hosts | | Final standings | Group B winners: Pos / Team / Pld / Pts; 1 / (Australia) Melbourne City / 3 / 9; 2 / (Iran) Bam Khatoon / 3 / 4; 3 / (Philippines) Kaya–Iloilo / 3 / 2; 4 / (Thailand) College of Asian Scholars (H) / 3 / 1; Source: AFC (H) Hosts | |
| Opponent | Result | Knockout stage | Opponent | Result |
| (Japan) Urawa Red Diamonds | 0–0 (a.e.t.) (6–5 p) | Quarter-finals | (Chinese Taipei) Taichung Blue Whale | 3–0 |
| (Vietnam) Hồ Chí Minh City | 2–0 | Semi-finals | (South Korea) Incheon Red Angels | 1–0 |

== Match ==
=== Details ===
24 May 2025
20:00 UTC+8

| Melbourne City (Australia) | 1–1 (a.e.t.) | (China) Wuhan Jiangda |
|---|---|---|
| McMahon 76' | Report | Wang Shuang 90+8' (pen.) |
Penalties
| McMahon (penalty scored); McKenna (penalty scored); Otto (penalty scored); Speckmaier (penalty scored); Stott (penalty missed); Henry (penalty missed) | 4–5 | (penalty scored) Yao Wei; (penalty scored) Wu Haiyan; (penalty scored) Deng Mengye; (penalty missed) Song Duan; (penalty scored) Wang Shuang; (penalty scored) Zhao Yuxin |

Wuhan Sports Center, Wuhan
Attendance: 18,715
Referee: Asaka Koizumi (Japan)

| Melbourne City | Wuhan Jiangda |

Man of the Match:
(China) Chen Chen (Wuhan Jiangda)

Assistant referees:
Makoto Bozono (Japan)
Chihiro Ikki (Japan)
Fourth official:
Pansa Chaisanit (Thailand)
Fifth official:
Amal Badhafari (United Arab Emirates)
Video assistant referee:
Abdullah Al-Shehri (Saudi Arabia)
Assistant video assistant referee:
Edita Mirabidova (Uzbekistan)

Match rules

- 90 minutes.
- 30 minutes of extra time if tied.
- Penalty shoot-out if still tied after extra time.
- Ten named substitutes, of which up to five may be used, with a sixth allowed in extra time. (Note: Each team was only given three opportunities to make substitutions, with a fourth opportunity in extra time, excluding substitutions made at half-time, before the start of extra time, and finally at half-time in extra time.)

== See also ==
- 2025 AFC Champions League Elite final
- 2025 AFC Champions League Two final
- 2025 AFC Challenge League final
