= 2024–25 AFC Women's Champions League =

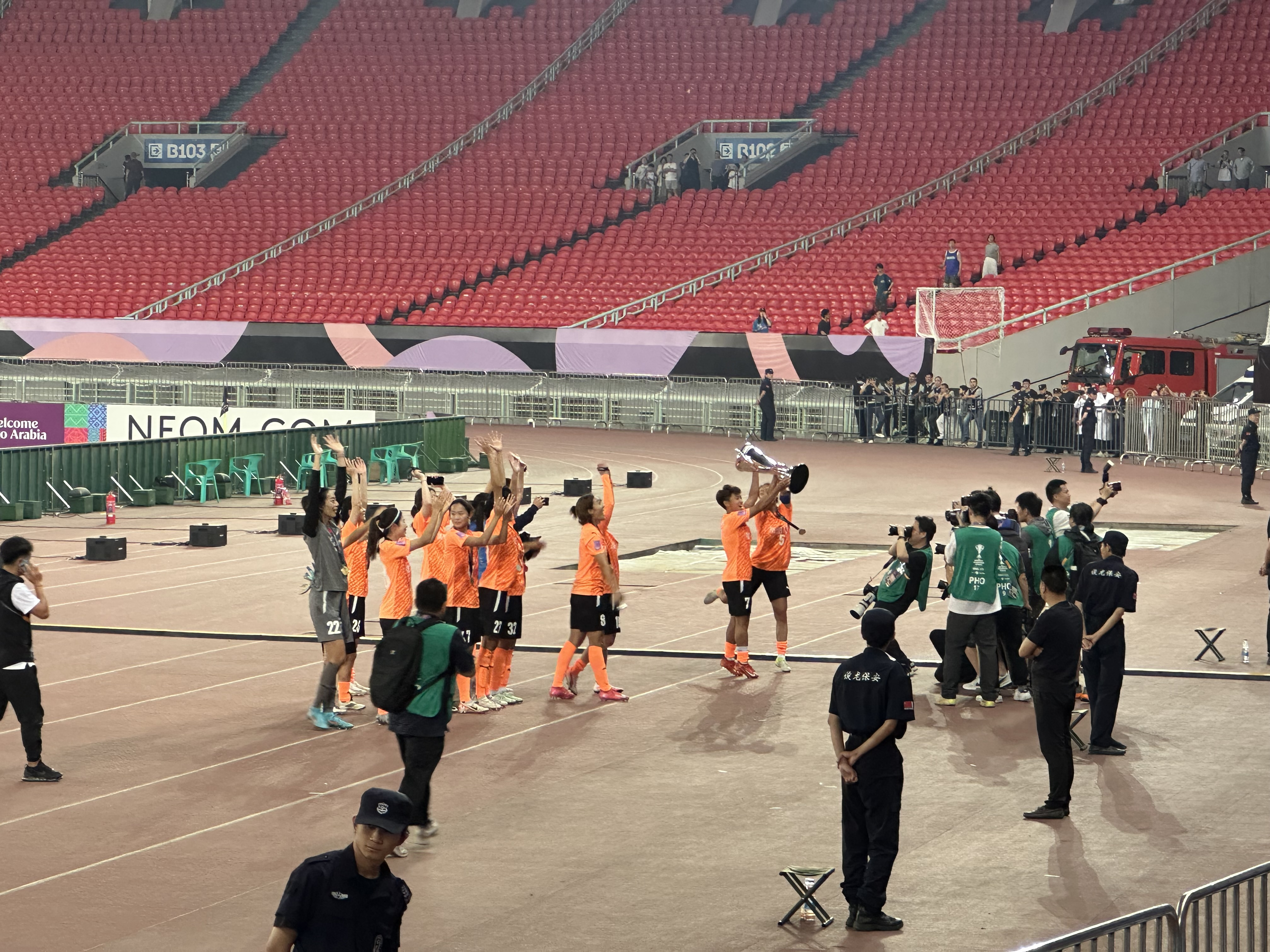
- Wuhan Jiangda celebrate after winning in the final

Tournament details
- Dates: Preliminary stage: 25–31 August 2024; Competition proper: 3 October 2024 – 24 May 2025
- Teams: Competition proper: 12; Total: 21 (from 21 associations)

Final positions
- Champions: (China) Wuhan Jiangda (1st title)
- Runners-up: (Australia) Melbourne City

Tournament statistics
- Matches played: 40
- Goals scored: 126 (3.15 per match)
- Attendance: 52,706 (1,318 per match)
- Top scorer(s): (Kenya) Terry Engesha (Japan) Miki Ito (5 goals each)
- Best player: (New Zealand) Rebekah Stott
- Fair play award: (Australia) Melbourne City

The 2024–25 AFC Women's Champions League was the first edition of the AFC Women's Champions League, Asia's premier club women's football tournament organized by the Asian Football Confederation (AFC).

Wuhan Jiangda defeated Melbourne City in the final, becoming the inaugural Women's Champions League winners. They qualified for the 2026 FIFA Women's Champions Cup and the 2028 FIFA Women's Club World Cup.

== Association team allocation ==
Key principles for the competition were released by the AFC on 20 August 2023. There is one entry per participating member association, with allocation based on the FIFA Women's World Ranking as of 15 March 2024. Clubs from the top ranked associations qualified directly to the group stage, with the remaining clubs starting from the preliminary stage.

Originally, 22 (out of 47) member associations applied to enter the competition. However, Naegohyang from North Korea withdrew before the draw.

Rank		Member association	Slots	
Rank		Member association	Group stage	Play-in qualifier
AFC	World	Member association	Group stage	Play-in qualifier
1	7	Japan	1	0
3	12	Australia	1	0
4	19	China	1	0
5	20	South Korea	1	0
6	37	Vietnam	1	0
7	39	Philippines	1	0
8	40	Chinese Taipei	1	0
9	47	Thailand	1	0
10	48	Uzbekistan	0	1
11	54	Myanmar	0	1
12	61	Iran	0	1
13	66	India	0	1
14	74	Jordan	0	1
15	79	Hong Kong	0	1
17	93	Laos	0	1
18	96	Malaysia	0	1
19	100	Nepal	0	1
22	114	United Arab Emirates	0	1
28	137	Singapore	0	1
38	173	Bhutan	0	1
40	175	Saudi Arabia	0	1
Total		Participating associations: 21	8	13
Total		Participating associations: 21	21	

Associations that did not enter a team:

- Afghanistan
- Bahrain
- Bangladesh
- Brunei
- Cambodia
- Guam
- Indonesia
- Iraq
- Kuwait
- Kyrgyzstan
- Lebanon
- Macau
- Maldives
- Mongolia
- North Korea (W)
- Northern Mariana Islands
- Oman
- Pakistan
- Palestine
- Qatar
- Sri Lanka
- Syria
- Tajikistan
- Timor-Leste
- Turkmenistan
- Yemen

Legend

- W withdrew before the draw

== Format ==
The competition comprises:

- a preliminary stage (one group of four and three groups of three teams) in centralised venues
- a main tournament with 12 teams (three groups of four teams) in centralised venues
- quarter-finals hosted by the group winners and the best second-placed team
- semi-finals and final in a centralised venue

=== Tiebreakers ===
Teams in the preliminary stage and the group stage are ranked according to points (3 points for a win, 1 point for a draw, 0 points for a loss). If two or more teams are tied on points, the following tiebreaking criteria are applied, in the order given, to determine the rankings:

1. Points in head-to-head matches among the tied teams;
2. Goal difference in head-to-head matches among the tied teams;
3. Goals scored in head-to-head matches among the tied teams;
4. If more than two teams are tied, and after applying all head-to-head criteria above, a subset of teams are still tied, all head-to-head criteria above are reapplied exclusively to this subset of teams;
5. Goal difference in all group matches;
6. Goals scored in all group matches;
7. Penalty shootout, if only two teams are tied, and the teams in question have played their last group match against each other;
8. Lower disciplinary score (direct red card = 3 points; double yellow card = 3 points; single yellow card = 1 point);
9. Drawing of lots.

== Schedule ==
Stage	Round	Draw date	Dates
Preliminary stage	Matchday 1	18 July 2024	25 August 2024
Preliminary stage	Matchday 2	18 July 2024	28 August 2024
Preliminary stage	Matchday 3	18 July 2024	31 August 2024
Group stage	Matchday 1	18 July 2024	3–12 October 2024
Group stage	Matchday 2	18 July 2024	3–12 October 2024
Group stage	Matchday 3	18 July 2024	3–12 October 2024
Knockout stage	Quarter-finals	8 January 2025	22–23 March 2025
Knockout stage	Semi-finals	8 January 2025	21 May 2025
Knockout stage	Final	8 January 2025	24 May 2025

== Teams ==
Location of the 2024–25 AFC Women's Champions League teams
Red: Group A; Blue: Group B; Green: Group C; Yellow: eliminated in Preliminary stage

Clubs from the top eight member associations qualified directly to the group stage, while the remaining 13 clubs entered at the preliminary stage.

Group stage direct entrants
Team	Qualifying method
(Japan) Urawa Red Diamonds	2023–24 WE League champions
(Australia) Melbourne City	2023–24 A-League Women premiers
(China) Wuhan Jiangda	2023 Chinese Women's Super League champions
(South Korea) Incheon Red Angels	2023 WK League champions
(Vietnam) Hồ Chí Minh City	2023 Vietnamese Women's National League champions
(Philippines) Kaya–Iloilo	2023 PFF Women's League champions
(Chinese Taipei) Taichung Blue Whale	2023 Taiwan Mulan Football League champions
(Thailand) College of Asian Scholars	2024 Thai Women's League 1 champions

Preliminary stage participants
Team	Qualifying method
(Uzbekistan) Nasaf	2024 Uzbekistan Women's League champions
(Myanmar) Myawady	2023 Myanmar Women's League champions
(Iran) Bam Khatoon	2023–24 Kowsar Women Football League champions
(India) Odisha	2023–24 Indian Women's League champions
(Jordan) Etihad	2023 Jordan Women's Pro League champions
(Hong Kong) Kitchee	2023–24 Hong Kong Women League champions
(Laos) Young Elephants	2023 Lao Women's League champions
(Malaysia) Sabah	2023 Malaysia National Women's League champions
(Nepal) APF	2022 Nepalese National Women's League champions
(United Arab Emirates) Abu Dhabi Country Club	2023–24 UAE Women's Football League champions
(Singapore) Lion City Sailors	2023 Women's Premier League champions
(Bhutan) Royal Thimphu College	2023 Women's National League champions
(Saudi Arabia) Al-Nassr	2023–24 Saudi Women's Premier League champions

== Preliminary stage ==
Bhutan, Jordan, Malaysia, and Saudi Arabia were the hosts of the four groups in the preliminary stage.

=== Seedings ===
Pot 1	Pot 2	Pot 3	Pot 4
1. (Uzbekistan) Nasaf; 2. (Myanmar) Myawady; 3. (Iran) **Bam Khatoon**; 4. (India) **Odisha**	5. (Jordan) Etihad **(H)**; 6. (Hong Kong) Kitchee; 7. (Laos) Young Elephants; 8. (Malaysia) **Sabah** **(H)**	9. (Nepal) APF; 10. (United Arab Emirates) **Abu Dhabi Country Club**; 11. (Singapore) Lion City Sailors; 12. (Bhutan) Royal Thimphu College **(H)**	13. (Saudi Arabia) Al-Nassr **(H)**

- **Bold** indicates teams qualified for the final tournament

(H) Hosts

=== Group A ===
Pos	Team	Pld	W	D	L	GF	GA	GD	Pts	Qualification
1	(United Arab Emirates) Abu Dhabi Country Club	3	3	0	0	4	1	+3	**9**	Advance to group stage
2	(Saudi Arabia) Al-Nassr (H)	3	2	0	1	6	1	+5	**6**	
3	(Laos) Young Elephants	3	1	0	2	4	5	−1	**3**	
4	(Myanmar) Myawady	3	0	0	3	0	7	−7	**0**	

Source: AFC
Rules for classification: Tiebreakers
(H) Hosts
25 August 2024
17:30 UTC+3

Young Elephants (Laos)	1–2	(United Arab Emirates) Abu Dhabi Country Club
Yoeurn 83'	Report	Tetteh 38'; Poudel 46'

King Saud University Stadium, Riyadh
Attendance: 50
Referee: Nodira Mirzoeva (Tajikistan)
25 August 2024
21:30 UTC+3

Myawady (Myanmar)	0–3	(Saudi Arabia) Al-Nassr
	Report	Luvanga 21', 28'; Al-Saiari 63'

King Saud University Stadium, Riyadh
Attendance: 294
Referee: Mu Mingxin (China)

28 August 2024
17:30 UTC+3

Abu Dhabi Country Club (United Arab Emirates)	1–0	(Myanmar) Myawady
Al-Marzooqi 87'	Report

King Saud University Stadium, Riyadh
Attendance: 50
Referee: Cha Min-ji (South Korea)
28 August 2024
21:30 UTC+3

Al-Nassr (Saudi Arabia)	3–0	(Laos) Young Elephants
Boussaha 37'; Kipoyi 39'; Luvanga 52'	Report

King Saud University Stadium, Riyadh
Attendance: 181
Referee: Trần Thị Thanh (Vietnam)

31 August 2024
20:15 UTC+3

Myawady (Myanmar)	0–3	(Laos) Young Elephants
	Report	Sone 24'; Yanagisawa 45', 77'

Al Nassr Club Stadium, Riyadh
Attendance: 11
Referee: Esra'a Al Mbaidin (Jordan)
31 August 2024
20:15 UTC+3

Abu Dhabi Country Club (United Arab Emirates)	1–0	(Saudi Arabia) Al-Nassr
Poudel 68'	Report

King Saud University Stadium, Riyadh
Attendance: 600
Referee: Mahsa Ghorbani (Iran)

=== Group B ===
Pos	Team	Pld	W	D	L	GF	GA	GD	Pts	Qualification
1	(India) Odisha	2	2	0	0	6	2	+4	**6**	Advance to group stage
2	(Jordan) Etihad (H)	2	1	0	1	6	2	+4	**3**	
3	(Singapore) Lion City Sailors	2	0	0	2	1	9	−8	**0**	

Source: AFC
Rules for classification: Tiebreakers
(H) Hosts
25 August 2024
19:00 UTC+3

Lion City Sailors (Singapore)	1–4	(India) Odisha
Raeka Ee 43'	Report	Dorcas Chu 20' (o.g.); Kom 54', 57'; Syazwani 88' (o.g.)

Prince Mohammed Stadium, Zarqa
Attendance: 50
Referee: Park Se-jin (South Korea)

28 August 2024
19:00 UTC+3

Etihad (Jordan)	5–0	(Singapore) Lion City Sailors
Jbarah 29', 35', 57', 59'; Fraij 45+2'	Report

Prince Mohammed Stadium, Zarqa
Attendance: 110
Referee: Plong Pich Akara (Cambodia)

31 August 2024
19:00 UTC+3

Odisha (India)	2–1	(Jordan) Etihad
Yeboah 27', 70'	Report	Jbarah 57'

Prince Mohammed Stadium, Zarqa
Attendance: 200
Referee: Rebecca Durcau (Australia)

=== Group C ===
Pos	Team	Pld	W	D	L	GF	GA	GD	Pts	Qualification
1	(Malaysia) Sabah (H)	2	1	1	0	2	1	+1	**4**	Advance to group stage
2	(Uzbekistan) Nasaf	2	1	0	1	2	2	0	**3**	
3	(Nepal) APF	2	0	1	1	0	1	−1	**1**	

Source: AFC
Rules for classification: Tiebreakers
(H) Hosts
25 August 2024
20:00 UTC+8

APF (Nepal)	0–1	(Uzbekistan) Nasaf
	Report	Niber-Lawrence 49'

Likas Stadium, Kota Kinabalu
Attendance: 75
Referee: Tian Jin (China)

28 August 2024
20:00 UTC+8

Sabah (Malaysia)	0–0	(Nepal) APF
	Report

Likas Stadium, Kota Kinabalu
Attendance: 2,983
Referee: Azusa Sugino (Japan)

31 August 2024
20:00 UTC+8

Nasaf (Uzbekistan)	1–2	(Malaysia) Sabah
Njolle 83'	Report	Win Theingi Tun 32', 44'

Likas Stadium, Kota Kinabalu
Attendance: 3,683
Referee: Tian Jin (China)

=== Group D ===
Pos	Team	Pld	W	D	L	GF	GA	GD	Pts	Qualification
1	(Iran) Bam Khatoon	2	2	0	0	4	1	+3	**6**	Advance to group stage
2	(Hong Kong) Kitchee	2	1	0	1	1	2	−1	**3**	
3	(Bhutan) Royal Thimphu College (H)	2	0	0	2	1	3	−2	**0**	

Source: AFC
Rules for classification: Tiebreakers
(H) Hosts
25 August 2024
18:00 UTC+6

Royal Thimphu College (Bhutan)	1–2	(Iran) Bam Khatoon
Chakma 27'	Report	Hamoudi 34'; Jafarizadeh 75'

Changlimithang Stadium, Thimphu
Attendance: 2,400
Referee: Khin Nyein Chan (Myanmar)

28 August 2024
18:00 UTC+6

Kitchee (Hong Kong)	1–0	(Bhutan) Royal Thimphu College
Fu Chiu Man 41'	Report

Changlimithang Stadium, Thimphu
Attendance: 1,700
Referee: Nurul Ain Izatty Zainal (Malaysia)

31 August 2024
18:00 UTC+6

Bam Khatoon (Iran)	2–0	(Hong Kong) Kitchee
Amineh 45+2'; Hamoudi 64'	Report

Changlimithang Stadium, Thimphu
Attendance: 450
Referee: Supiree Testhomya (Thailand)

== Group stage ==
The group stage was played from 6 to 12 October 2024. The four teams in each of the three groups played one another in a centralised single round-robin format. The top two finishers in each group, together with the two best third-placed teams, advanced to the knockout stage. China, Thailand and Vietnam were the hosts of the three groups.

=== Seedings ===
Pot 1	Pot 2	Pot 3	Pot 4 (Note: This pot contained the winners of the preliminary stage, whose identity was not known at the time of draw.)
1. (Japan) Urawa Red Diamonds; 2. (Australia) Melbourne City; 3. (China) Wuhan Jiangda (H)	4. (South Korea) Incheon Red Angels; 5. (Vietnam) Hồ Chí Minh City (H); 6. (Philippines) Kaya–Iloilo	7. (Chinese Taipei) Taichung Blue Whale; 8. (Thailand) College of Asian Scholars (H)	9. (United Arab Emirates) Abu Dhabi Country Club; 10. (India) Odisha; 11. (Malaysia) Sabah; 12. (Iran) Bam Khatoon

(H) Hosts

=== Group A ===
Pos	Team	Pld	W	D	L	GF	GA	GD	Pts	Qualification
1	(South Korea) Incheon Red Angels	3	2	1	0	7	2	+5	7	Advance to Quarter-finals
2	(United Arab Emirates) Abu Dhabi Country Club	3	1	2	0	6	5	+1	5	Advance to Quarter-finals
3	(China) Wuhan Jiangda (H)	3	1	0	2	8	4	+4	3	Advance to Quarter-finals
4	(Malaysia) Sabah	3	0	1	2	2	12	−10	1	

Source: AFC
Rules for classification: Tiebreakers
(H) Hosts
3 October 2024
16:00 UTC+8

Wuhan Jiangda (China)	1–2	(United Arab Emirates) Abu Dhabi Country Club
Mupopo 4'	Report	Juma 90', 90+3'

Hankou Cultural Sports Centre, Wuhan
Attendance: 1,049
Referee: Rebecca Durcau (Australia)
3 October 2024
20:00 UTC+8

Incheon Red Angels (South Korea)	3–0	(Malaysia) Sabah
Jang Chang 25'; Engesha 32', 45+3'	Report

Hankou Cultural Sports Centre, Wuhan
Attendance: 136
Referee: Mahsa Ghorbani (Iran)

6 October 2024
16:00 UTC+8

Sabah (Malaysia)	0–7	(China) Wuhan Jiangda
	Report	Mupopo 31'; Song Duan 39'; Deng Mengye 44', 55', 81'; Traoré 53'; Yao Wei 57'

Hankou Cultural Sports Centre, Wuhan
Attendance: 630
Referee: Doumouh Al Bakkar (Lebanon)
6 October 2024
20:00 UTC+8

Abu Dhabi Country Club (United Arab Emirates)	2–2	(South Korea) Incheon Red Angels
Ivanuša 3'; Kuliš 55'	Report	Engesha 34', 90+8'

Hankou Cultural Sports Centre, Wuhan
Attendance: 178
Referee: Alesar Baddour (Syria)

9 October 2024
16:00 UTC+8

Sabah (Malaysia)	2–2	(United Arab Emirates) Abu Dhabi Country Club
Narita 10'; Intan 77'	Report	Ibrahim 30'; Tetteh 44'

Hankou Cultural Sports Centre, Wuhan
Attendance: 158
Referee: Supiree Testhomya (Thailand)
9 October 2024
20:00 UTC+8

Wuhan Jiangda (China)	0–2	(South Korea) Incheon Red Angels
	Report	Tanaka 43'; Engesha 79'

Hankou Cultural Sports Centre, Wuhan
Attendance: 795
Referee: Veronika Bernatskaya (Kyrgyzstan)

=== Group B ===
Pos	Team	Pld	W	D	L	GF	GA	GD	Pts	Qualification
1	(Australia) Melbourne City	3	3	0	0	9	1	+8	9	Advance to Quarter-finals
2	(Iran) Bam Khatoon	3	1	1	1	4	4	0	4	Advance to Quarter-finals
3	(Philippines) Kaya–Iloilo	3	0	2	1	1	5	−4	2	
4	(Thailand) College of Asian Scholars (H)	3	0	1	2	1	5	−4	1	

Source: AFC
Rules for classification: Tiebreakers
(H) Hosts
6 October 2024
16:00 UTC+7

Melbourne City (Australia)	2–1	(Iran) Bam Khatoon
Pollicina 40'; Speckmaier 43'	Report	Hamoudi 70'

BG Stadium, Pathum Thani
Attendance: 391
Referee: Kim Yu-jeong (South Korea)
6 October 2024
20:00 UTC+7

Kaya–Iloilo (Philippines)	0–0	(Thailand) College of Asian Scholars
	Report

BG Stadium, Pathum Thani
Attendance: 611
Referee: Bùi Thị Thu Trang (Vietnam)

9 October 2024
16:00 UTC+7

Bam Khatoon (Iran)	1–1	(Philippines) Kaya–Iloilo
Ghanbari 39' (pen.)	Report	Onrubia 90+4'

BG Stadium, Pathum Thani
Attendance: 120
Referee: Ranjita Devi (India)
9 October 2024
20:00 UTC+7

College of Asian Scholars (Thailand)	0–3	(Australia) Melbourne City
	Report	Speckmaier 16'; Vlajnić 51'; Bosch 67'

BG Stadium, Pathum Thani
Attendance: 414
Referee: Yang Shu-ting (Chinese Taipei)

12 October 2024
16:00 UTC+7

Melbourne City (Australia)	4–0	(Philippines) Kaya–Iloilo
Speckmaier 4'; Stott 7'; Bosch 10', 38'	Report

BG Stadium, Pathum Thani
Attendance: 150
Referee: Khuloud Khudoum (United Arab Emirates)
12 October 2024
20:00 UTC+7

College of Asian Scholars (Thailand)	1–2	(Iran) Bam Khatoon
Orapin 30'	Report	Jafarizadeh 35'; Ghanbari 90+3'

BG Stadium, Pathum Thani
Attendance: 250
Referee: Yoshimi Yamashita (Japan)

=== Group C ===
Pos	Team	Pld	W	D	L	GF	GA	GD	Pts	Qualification
1	(Japan) Urawa Red Diamonds	3	3	0	0	21	0	+21	9	Advance to Quarter-finals
2	(Vietnam) Hồ Chí Minh City (H)	3	2	0	1	6	4	+2	6	Advance to Quarter-finals
3	(Chinese Taipei) Taichung Blue Whale	3	1	0	2	5	5	0	3	Advance to Quarter-finals
4	(India) Odisha	3	0	0	3	1	24	−23	0	

Source: AFC
Rules for classification: Tiebreakers
(H) Hosts
6 October 2024
15:00 UTC+7

Urawa Red Diamonds (Japan)	17–0	(India) Odisha
Endo 5'; Fujisaki 9'; Takatsuka 13'; Shiokoshi 15', 18', 30'; Shimada 17', 44'; Tanno 53'; Kurishima 54'; Ito 56', 59', 62', 66', 90+4'; Tsunoda 68'; Takeuchi 83'	Report

Thống Nhất Stadium, Ho Chi Minh City
Attendance: 186
Referee: Pansa Chaisanit (Thailand)
6 October 2024
19:00 UTC+7

Hồ Chí Minh City (Vietnam)	3–1	(Chinese Taipei) Taichung Blue Whale
Nguyễn Thị Tuyết Ngân 50'; Huỳnh Như 65', 67'	Report	Huang Ke-sin 85'

Thống Nhất Stadium, Ho Chi Minh City
Attendance: 1,086
Referee: Khin Nyein Chan (Myanmar)

9 October 2024
15:15 UTC+7

Taichung Blue Whale (Chinese Taipei)	0–2	(Japan) Urawa Red Diamonds
	Report	Shiokoshi 65' (pen.); Tanno 70'

Thống Nhất Stadium, Ho Chi Minh City
Attendance: 162
Referee: Tian Jin (China)
9 October 2024
19:00 UTC+7

Odisha (India)	1–3	(Vietnam) Hồ Chí Minh City
Yeboah 63'	Report	Nguyễn Thị Kim Yến 1'; Huỳnh Như 42'; Ngô Thị Hồng Nhung 90+4'

Thống Nhất Stadium, Ho Chi Minh City
Attendance: 682
Referee: Yu Hong (China)

12 October 2024
15:00 UTC+7

Taichung Blue Whale (Chinese Taipei)	4–0	(India) Odisha
Chen Jin-wen 42', 69'; Tanaka 45'; Silawan 57'	Report

Thống Nhất Stadium, Ho Chi Minh City
Attendance: 135
Referee: Edita Mirabidova (Uzbekistan)
12 October 2024
19:00 UTC+7

Urawa Red Diamonds (Japan)	2–0	(Vietnam) Hồ Chí Minh City
Chương Thị Kiều 25' (o.g.); Tsunoda 50'	Report

Thống Nhất Stadium, Ho Chi Minh City
Attendance: 1,097
Referee: Oh Hyeon-jeong (South Korea)

=== Ranking of second-placed teams ===
Pos	Grp	Team	Pld	W	D	L	GF	GA	GD	Pts	Qualification
1	C	(Vietnam) Hồ Chí Minh City	3	2	0	1	6	4	+2	6	Seeded in Quarter-finals draw
2	A	(United Arab Emirates) Abu Dhabi Country Club	3	1	2	0	6	5	+1	5	Unseeded in Quarter-finals draw
3	B	(Iran) Bam Khatoon	3	1	1	1	4	4	0	4	Unseeded in Quarter-finals draw

Source: AFC
Rules for classification: 1) Points; 2) Goal difference; 3) Goals scored; 4) Discilpinary points; 5) Drawing of lots.

=== Ranking of third-placed teams ===
Pos	Grp	Team	Pld	W	D	L	GF	GA	GD	Pts	Qualification
1	A	(China) Wuhan Jiangda	3	1	0	2	8	4	+4	3	Advance to Quarter-finals (unseeded)
2	C	(Chinese Taipei) Taichung Blue Whale	3	1	0	2	5	5	0	3	Advance to Quarter-finals (unseeded)
3	B	(Philippines) Kaya–Iloilo	3	0	2	1	1	5	−4	2	

Source: AFC
Rules for classification: 1) Points; 2) Goal difference; 3) Goals scored; 4) Discilpinary points; 5) Drawing of lots.

== Knockout stage ==
=== Draw ===
The draw was held on 8 January 2025. For the quarter-finals, teams were seeded based on their performance in the group stage. The three group winners and the best second-placed team were seeded and will be the hosts for the match. Teams from the same group were not drawn against each other.

Seeded	Unseeded
(Japan) Urawa Red Diamonds; (Australia) Melbourne City; (South Korea) Incheon Red Angels; (Vietnam) Hồ Chí Minh City	(United Arab Emirates) Abu Dhabi Country Club; (Iran) Bam Khatoon; (China) Wuhan Jiangda; (Chinese Taipei) Taichung Blue Whale

=== Bracket ===
Quarter-finals
22 March – Incheon
(South Korea) Incheon Red Angels	1
(Iran) Bam Khatoon	0
23 March – Melbourne
(Australia) Melbourne City	3
(Chinese Taipei) Taichung Blue Whale	0
23 March – Kumagaya
(Japan) Urawa Red Diamonds	0 (5)
(China) Wuhan Jiangda (p)	0 (6)
22 March – Ho Chi Minh City
(Vietnam) Hồ Chí Minh City	5
(United Arab Emirates) Abu Dhabi Country Club	4

Semi-finals
21 May – Wuhan
(South Korea) Incheon Red Angels	0
(Australia) Melbourne City	1
21 May – Wuhan
(China) Wuhan Jiangda	2
(Vietnam) Hồ Chí Minh City	0

Final
24 May – Wuhan
(Australia) Melbourne City	1 (4)
(China) Wuhan Jiangda (p)	1 (5)

=== Quarter-finals ===
22 March 2025
19:00 UTC+9

Incheon Red Angels (South Korea)	1–0	(Iran) Bam Khatoon
Kim Myeong-jin 81'	Report

Incheon Namdong Asiad Rugby Field, Incheon
Attendance: 583
Referee: Asaka Koizumi (Japan)

22 March 2025
19:00 UTC+7

Hồ Chí Minh City (Vietnam)	5–4	(United Arab Emirates) Abu Dhabi Country Club
K'Thủa 63'; Chương Thị Kiều 67'; Trần Nguyễn Bảo Châu 76'; Ngô Thị Hồng Nhung 83'; Al-Zaabi 89' (o.g.)	Report	Adubea 3'; Al-Ghafri 15'; Tetteh 45+2', 74'

Thống Nhất Stadium, Ho Chi Minh City
Attendance: 1,550
Referee: Casey Reibelt (Australia)

23 March 2025
15:00 UTC+11

Melbourne City (Australia)	3–0	(Chinese Taipei) Taichung Blue Whale
Speckmaier 4'; Li Pei-jung 43' (o.g.); McNamara 63'	Report

Melbourne Rectangular Stadium, Melbourne
Attendance: 1,865
Referee: Kim Yu-jeong (South Korea)

23 March 2025
15:00 UTC+9

Urawa Red Diamonds (Japan)	0–0 (a.e.t.)	(China) Wuhan Jiangda
	Report
Penalties
Takahashi (penalty scored); Shiokoshi (penalty scored); Fujisaki (penalty missed); Ikeda (penalty scored); Goto (penalty scored); Ito (penalty missed); Kurishima (penalty scored); Endo (penalty missed)	5–6	(penalty scored) Yao Wei; (penalty missed) Wu Haiyan; (penalty scored) Deng Mengye; (penalty scored) Zhao Yuxin; (penalty scored) Wang Shuang; (penalty missed) Tang Han; (penalty scored) Ma Jun; (penalty scored) Xu Qianqian

Kumagaya Athletic Stadium, Kumagaya
Attendance: 3,243
Referee: Oh Hyeon-jeong (South Korea)

=== Semi-finals ===
21 May 2025
16:00 UTC+8

Wuhan Jiangda (China)	2–0	(Vietnam) Hồ Chí Minh City
Wang Shuang 34'; Song Duan 54'	Report

Wuhan Sports Center, Wuhan
Attendance: 4,977
Referee: Veronika Bernatskaya (Kyrgyzstan)

21 May 2025
20:00 UTC+8

Incheon Red Angels (South Korea)	0–1	(Australia) Melbourne City
	Report	McMahon 90+4'

Wuhan Sports Center, Wuhan
Attendance: 706
Referee: Pansa Chaisanit (Thailand)

=== Final ===
24 May 2025
20:00 UTC+8

Melbourne City (Australia)	1–1 (a.e.t.)	(China) Wuhan Jiangda
McMahon 76'	Report	Wang Shuang 90+8' (pen.)
Penalties
McMahon (penalty scored); McKenna (penalty scored); Otto (penalty scored); Speckmaier (penalty scored); Stott (penalty missed); Henry (penalty missed)	4–5	(penalty scored) Yao Wei; (penalty scored) Wu Haiyan; (penalty scored) Deng Mengye; (penalty missed) Song Duan; (penalty scored) Wang Shuang; (penalty scored) Zhao Yuxin

Wuhan Sports Center, Wuhan
Attendance: 18,715
Referee: Asaka Koizumi (Japan)

== Top scorers ==
Team eliminated for this round.
Player is not in the team but the team is still active for this round.
- Goals scored in the preliminary stage and matches voided by AFC are not counted when determining top scorer.

Rank	Player	Team	MD1	MD2	MD3	QF	SF	F	Total
1	(Kenya) Terry Engesha	(South Korea) Incheon Red Angels (Note: all Engesha's goals were scored while at Incheon Red Angels)/ (China) Wuhan Jiangda	2	2	1				5
1	(Japan) Miki Ito	(Japan) Urawa Red Diamonds	5						5
3	(Japan) Yuzuho Shiokoshi	(Japan) Urawa Red Diamonds	3	1					4
3	(Venezuela) Mariana Speckmaier	(Australia) Melbourne City	1	1	1	1			4
5	(Mexico) Lourdes Bosch	(Australia) Melbourne City		1	2				3
5	(China) Deng Mengye	(China) Wuhan Jiangda		3					3
5	(Vietnam) Huỳnh Như	(Vietnam) Hồ Chí Minh City	2	1					3
5	(Ghana) Eugenia Tetteh	(United Arab Emirates) Abu Dhabi Country Club			1	2			3
9	(China) Song Duan	(China) Wuhan Jiangda		1			1		2
9	(Vietnam) Ngô Thị Hồng Nhung	(Vietnam) Hồ Chí Minh City		1		1			2
9	(Iran) Zahra Ghanbari	(Iran) Bam Khatoon		1	1				2
9	(Chinese Taipei) Chen Jin-wen	(Chinese Taipei) Taichung Blue Whale			2				2
9	(United Arab Emirates) Naeema Juma	(United Arab Emirates) Abu Dhabi Country Club	2						2
9	(Australia) Shelby McMahon	(Australia) Melbourne City					1	1	2
9	(Zambia) Kabange Mupopo	(China) Wuhan Jiangda	1	1					2
9	(Japan) Mei Shimada	(Japan) Urawa Red Diamonds	2						2
9	(China) Wang Shuang	(China) Wuhan Jiangda					1	1	2
9	(Japan) Ririka Tanno	(Japan) Urawa Red Diamonds	1	1					2
9	(Japan) Fuka Tsunoda	(Japan) Urawa Red Diamonds	1		1				2

== See also ==
- 2024–25 AFC Champions League Elite
- 2024–25 AFC Champions League Two
- 2024–25 AFC Challenge League
