= Alexia Apostolakis =

Australian soccer player (born 2006)

Personal information
- Full name: Alexia Marina Apostolakis
- Date of birth: 16 May 2006 (age 20)
- Place of birth: Sydney, New South Wales, Australia
- Height: 1.70 m (5 ft 7 in)
- Positions: Defender; midfielder

Team information
- Current team: Bristol City
- Number: 12

Youth career
- St George City
- Barcelona Academy Sydney

Senior career*
Years	Team	Apps	(Gls)
2021–2022	Western Sydney Wanderers	11	(1)
2022	Football NSW Institute	12	(0)
2022–2023	Western Sydney Wanderers	14	(0)
2023	Bankstown City Lions	12	(0)
2023–2024	Western Sydney Wanderers	17	(1)
2024–2026	Melbourne City	47	(2)
2026–	Bristol City	5	(0)

International career^{‡}
2022–	Australia U20	25	(1)
2022–	Australia U23	6	(0)
2025–	Australia	1	(0)
- * Club domestic league appearances and goals as of 25 October 2026 ‡ National team caps and goals as of 14 April 2026

Alexia Marina Apostolakis (Greek: Αλεξία Μαρίνα Αποστολάκης, pronounced [apostoˈlacis] ap-OSTO-LAH-kis; born 16 May 2006) is an Australian soccer player who plays as a defender or midfielder for Women's Super League 2 club Bristol City (WSL 2) and the Australia national team. She previously played for A-League Women clubs Western Sydney Wanderers and Melbourne City, and has represented Australia at youth international level.

== Early life ==
Apostolakis was born in Sydney on 16 May 2006, to a second-generation Greek father and Filipina mother. As a junior she played for Forest Rangers. She trained at St George FA and FC Barcelona Academy Sydney.

== Club career ==
During the 2021–22 season of the A-League Women, Apostolakis debuted for Western Sydney Wanderers in December. She appeared 11 times and provided one goal, upon scoring in February 2022, Apostalakis became the youngest Wanderers' scorer of all time at 15 years 279 days. In the A-Leagues Women's off-season, the midfielder transferred to Football NSW Institute in the National Premier Leagues NSW Women's (NPL NSW Women's) for twelve matches before returning to Wanderers for 2022–23 season.

In the A-League Women's 2023 off-season, Apostolakis returned to NPL NSW Women's, but joined Bankstown City Lions. She returned to the Wanderers for 2023–24 season, where she kicked one goal over 17 appearances. Apostolakis was transferred to Melbourne City as a defender in July 2024, on a two year contract. During City's 2024–25 season, she appeared 22 times and provided two goals to help her team become league premiers. Apostolakis represented City at 2024–25 AFC Women's Champions League across all six of their matches to finish runners-up to Wuhan Jiangda on 24 May. In June 2026, Apostolakis departed Melbourne City at the conclusion of her contract to pursue an opportunity overseas.

The week after departing Melbourne City, it was announced that Apostolakis joined Women's Super League 2 club Bristol City.

== International career ==
Australia women's national under-20 soccer team (Young Matildas) coach Leah Blayney named Apostolakis as a defender to their training camp in May 2022. She joined the 21-player final squad for the 2022 FIFA U-20 Women's World Cup, held in Costa Rica in August. At the tournament the Young Matildas finished third in Group A and were eliminated. The defender joined the Young Matildas for the 2024 AFC U-20 Women's Asian Cup qualification first round in Group C, held in Kyrgyzstan in March 2023. By topping the group, they proceeded to the second round in Group A, which occurred in Vietnam in June – again they topped the group and went on to the 2024 AFC U-20 Women's Asian Cup tournament in Uzbekistan in March 2024. They headed Group A, but lost their semi-final 1–5 against Japan U20. Young Matildas won the third place match 1–0 versus South Korea U20 to be awarded the bronze medal.

As the tournament's semi-finalists Young Matildas qualified for 2024 FIFA U-20 Women's World Cup in Colombia in August–September. By the time the squad was finalised in mid-August, Apostolakis had played 16 matches with the Young Matildas and kicked one goal. At that tournament the Australian U20s lost all three group games without scoring a goal and were eliminated. At the 2026 AFC U-20 Women's Asian Cup qualifiers in Tajikistan in August 2025, Apostolakis was appointed captain. She led them to three victories and qualification for the final tournament, which is due in April 2026 in Thailand.

Back in mid-2022, Apostolakis was chosen by senior women's assistant coach, Melissa Andreatta to join the newly established Australia women's national under-23 soccer team (U23 Matildas), which competed in the 2022 AFF Women's Championship, held in Philippines in July. They faced ASEAN Football Federation (AFF) senior national women's squads. The U23 Matildas finished third in Group A after winning three matches, but losing 0–1 to eventual champions Philippines and drawing 2–2 with Thailand, who finished tournament runners-up. In September 2023 she was named to the U23 Matildas squad for two friendlies in Varese, Italy. They played AC Milan Women and then Scotland U23. She also joined the squad, which contested the Four Nations invitational under-23 tournament held in Växjö, Sweden from 30 May to 4 June 2024. Australia lost against hosts, Sweden U23 and visitors Germany U23, but won against visitors Poland U23.

Apostolakis received her first call-up for the senior Matildas in 2025, when she was added to the extended squad for two friendlies against South Korea in Sydney and Newcastle following an ankle injury to fellow defender Ellie Carpenter. She made her debut for the Matildas in their 0–1 loss to visitors Panama on 5 July 2025 at Bunbury, Western Australia.

Apostolakis was selected by head coach Alex Epakis as part of Australia's 23-player squad for the 2026 AFC U-20 Women's Asian Cup in Thailand.

== Style of play ==
In a July 2026 interview with Bristol City, Apostolakis described herself as "versatile", "physical" and "creative", and said she can play "anywhere in the back line". Beginning her career at Western Sydney Wanderers as a midfielder, she played as a full back for Melbourne City and continues to do so for Bristol City.

== Personal life ==
Apostolakis is close friends with national team teammate Daniela Galić, who she describes as being like "family". The two are roommates during national team camps.

== Honours ==
Melbourne City

- A-League Women: Premiership: 2024–25, 2025–26
- A-League Women: Championship: 2026
- AFC Women's Champions League

Runners-up: 2024–25
