= Lourdes Bosch =

Mexican footballer (born 2001)

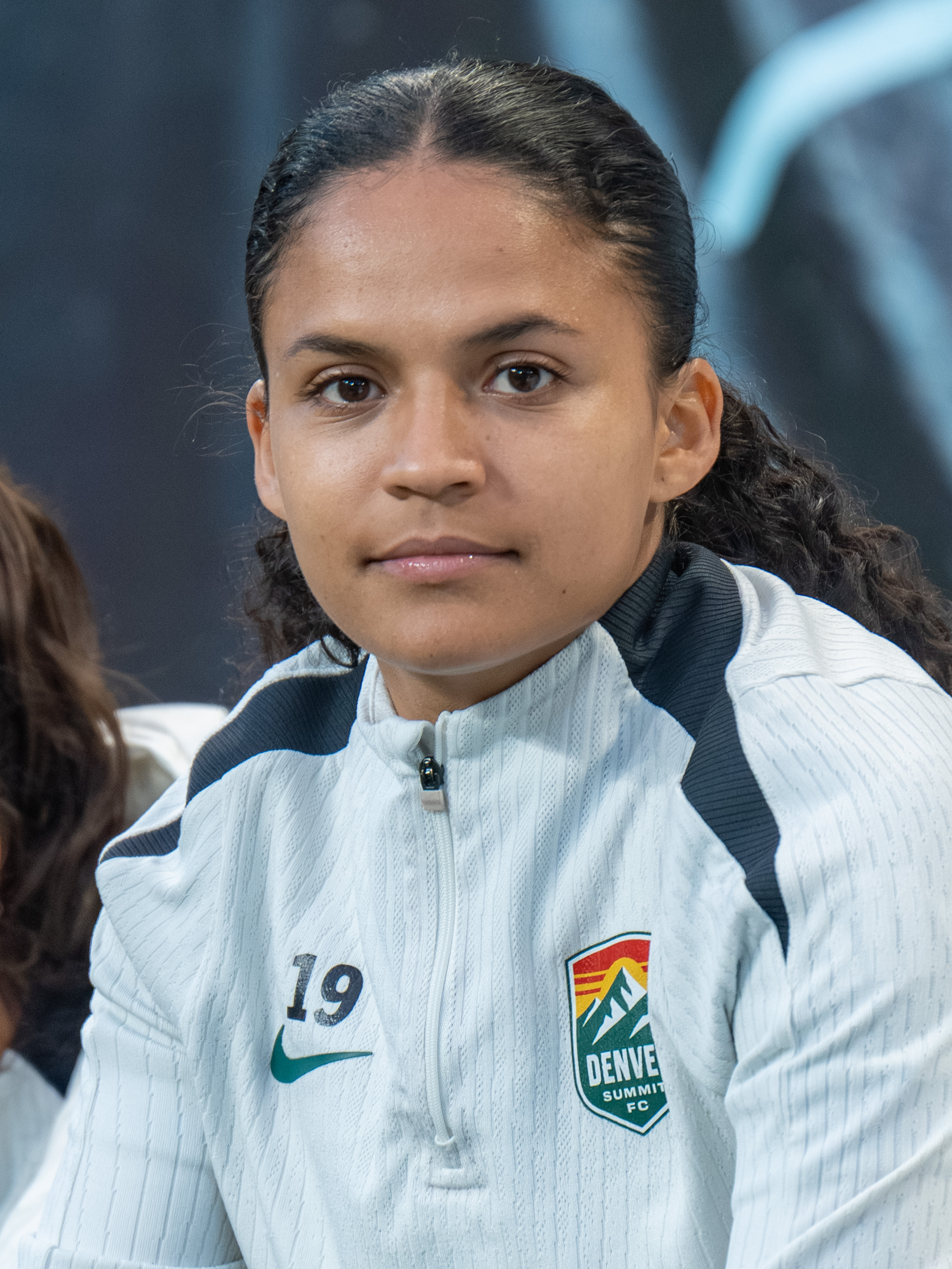
- Bosch with the Denver Summit in 2026

Personal information
- Full name: Lourdes de la Caridad Bosch
- Date of birth: 17 August 2001 (age 25)
- Place of birth: Las Vegas, Nevada, U.S.
- Position: Midfielder

Team information
- Current team: Monterrey
- Number: 9

Youth career
- Las Vegas Premier SC
- Heat FC

College career
Years	Team	Apps	(Gls)
2019–2021	UNLV Rebels	44	(12)
2022–2023	California Baptist Lancers	27	(10)

Senior career*
Years	Team	Apps	(Gls)
2024–2025	Melbourne City	22	(4)
2026	Denver Summit	0	(0)
2025	→ Monterrey (loan)	8	(2)
2026–	Monterrey	0	(0)

International career^{‡}
2025–	Mexico	1	(0)
Medal record
Women's football
Representing Mexico
Central American and Caribbean Games
Gold medal – first place	2026 Santo Domingo	Team
- * Club domestic league appearances and goals as of 10 November 2025 ‡ National team caps and goals as of 30 May 2025

Lourdes de la Caridad Bosch (born 17 August 2001) is a professional footballer who plays as a midfielder for Liga Femenil club Monterrey. Born in the United States, she plays for the Mexico national team. She played college soccer for the UNLV Rebels and the California Baptist Lancers. She began her professional career with Australian club Melbourne City in 2024.

== Early life ==
Born and raised in Las Vegas, Bosch began playing soccer when she was eight years old. She played club soccer for Las Vegas Premier Soccer Club and Heat FC, winning state cup titles with both teams. She attended West Career and Technical Academy and Spring Valley High School, graduating one semester early.

== College career ==
Bosch enrolled in the University of Nevada, Las Vegas, in the spring of 2019. In three seasons with the UNLV Rebels, she played in 44 games and scored 12 goals. She was named second-team all-Mountain West Conference as a sophomore and first-team all-conference as a junior.

Bosch transferred to California Baptist University in 2022. In her first season with the California Baptist Lancers, she scored 7 goals in 16 games and was named first-team all-Western Athletic Conference. In her fifth season of eligibility in 2023, granted due to the COVID-19 pandemic, she scored 3 goals in 11 games after missing several games through injury. She helped the Lancers finish second in the conference standings and was named to the all-conference second team and the WAC tournament all-tournament team.

== Club career ==
=== Melbourne City ===
After going undrafted in the 2024 NWSL Draft, Bosch worked as a bank intern in Las Vegas before beginning her professional career in Australia, signing a two-year contract with A-League Women club Melbourne City on September 3, 2024. She made her professional debut on October 6 against Iranian club Bam Khatoon in the 2024–25 AFC Women's Champions League group stage. She scored her first professional goal in the second game of the competition against Thailand's BGC–College of Asian Scholars, followed by a brace against Kaya Iloilo of the Philippines.

On November 9, 2024, in her second league game, Bosch scored her first A-League Women goal and assisted Mariana Speckmaier as City won 3–2 against rivals Melbourne Victory. Melbourne City went undefeated the entire 2024–25 regular season and topped the league table. Bosch was the league's assist leader with 9 assists and scored 4 goals in 22 appearances. On May 11, 2025, in the second leg of the league semifinals, Bosch was sent off for hitting a Central Coast Mariners player in the face and received a two-game ban for the incident, before her team lost in extra time after an incorrect onside ruling. She scored 7 goals in 29 appearances in all competitions during her season with the club.

=== Monterrey ===
On August 21, 2025, National Women's Soccer League (NWSL) expansion team Denver Summit announced that the club had acquired Bosch for an undisclosed transfer fee, signing her to a contract through 2027. She joined Liga MX Femenil club Monterrey on loan before Denver began play in 2026. On September 12, she made her debut for Las Rayadas and scored the 1–0 winner against Toluca. She finished the loan with 2 goals in 8 appearances.

On August 21, 2026, having not seen playing time with Denver, Bosch returned to Monterrey on a permanent transfer for an undisclosed fee.

== International career ==
Bosch received her first call-up to the Mexico national team in May 2025. She made her international debut on May 30, 2025, coming on as a late substitute for Jasmine Casarez in a 2–2 friendly draw against Uruguay.

== Personal life ==
Bosch is the middle of three children born to Rogert and Maricruz Bosch. She is of Cuban descent on her father's side and Mexican descent on her mother's side.

== Honors and awards ==
Melbourne City

- A-League Women Premiership: 2024–25

Mexico U23

- Central American and Caribbean Gold Medal: 2026

Individual

- First-team All-WAC: 2022
- First-team All-MW: 2021
- Second-team All-WAC: 2023
- Second-team All-MW: 2020
- WAC tournament all-tournament team: 2023
- A-League Women top assist provider: 2024–25
