= Shelby McMahon =

Australian soccer player (born 2008)

- McMahon at Pathum Thani Stadium in 2026.

Personal information
- Date of birth: 13 May 2008 (age 18)
- Place of birth: Australia
- Position: Midfielder

Team information
- Current team: Melbourne City
- Number: 12

Senior career*
Years	Team	Apps	(Gls)
2024–	Melbourne City	23	(1)

International career^{‡}
- Australia U17
2026–	Australia U20	3	(0)
- * Club domestic league appearances and goals as of 3 May 2025 ‡ National team caps and goals as of 14 April 2026

Shelby McMahon (/məkmɑːn/ mək-MAHN; born 13 May 2008) is an Australian soccer player who plays as a midfielder for A-League Women club Melbourne City.

== Early life ==
McMahon was born on 13 May 2008. She grew up on the Gold Coast, Queensland.

== Club career ==
15-year-old McMahon joined Melbourne City as an injury replacement for Holly McNamara in January 2024.

On 21 May 2025, in the semifinals of the 2024–25 AFC Women's Champions League, McMahon scored a "thunderous right-foot drive into the top corner" from 23 metres during stoppage time against Incheon Red Angels, leading her team to a 1–0 victory. In the final on May 24, she scored the opening goal in a 1–1 draw against Wuhan Jianghan and converted her penalty kick in a 5–4 loss in the penalty shootout.

In the 2025–26 season, McMahon was part of the Melbourne City side that won the double, winning both the premiership (the league title) and the championship (the grand final). After establishing herself as one of the best young players in the league, she was selected for the A-Leagues All Stars Women team that will play against Women's Super League (WSL) club Chelsea in the 2026 game at Allianz Stadium in Moore Park, Sydney as part of the 2026 Sydney Super Cup.

== International career ==
McMahon has represented Australia as an under-17 and under-20 international.

McMahon was selected by head coach Alex Epakis as part of Australia's 23-player squad for the 2026 AFC U-20 Women's Asian Cup in Thailand.

== Honours ==
Melbourne City

- A-League Women: 2023–24
