= Miki Ito (footballer) =

Japanese footballer

Personal information
- Date of birth: 10 September 1995 (age 31)
- Place of birth: Aomori Prefecture, Japan
- Height: 1.65 m (5 ft 5 in)
- Position: Midfielder

Team information
- Current team: Urawa Red Diamonds
- Number: 5

Senior career*
Years	Team	Apps	(Gls)
2014–2023	INAC Kobe Leonessa		
2023–	Urawa Red Diamonds		
- * Club domestic league appearances and goals

Miki Ito (born 10 September 1995) is a Japanese professional footballer who plays as a midfielder for WE League club Urawa Red Diamonds Ladies.

== Club career ==
Nishikawa made her WE League debut on 12 September 2021.
