= A-League Women Young Footballer of the Year =

Australian women's association football award

- Awarded for: The top young player in a given A-League Women season.
- Country: Australia
- Presented by: Football Federation Australia
- First award: 2008
- Currently held by: Pia Vlok

Highlights
- Most wins: Ellie Carpenter (3)

The A-League Women Young Footballer of the Year is an annual association football award presented to a player in the Australian A-League Women.

The W-League was established in 2008 as the top tier of women's football in Australia. The award is given to a top-performing young player over the regular season (not including the finals series). The inaugural award was shared by Elise Kellond-Knight of Brisbane Roar and Ellyse Perry of Canberra United.

Ellie Carpenter has won the award three times. Steph Catley won the award twice. Pia Vlok is the first non-Australian to win the award.

== Winners ==
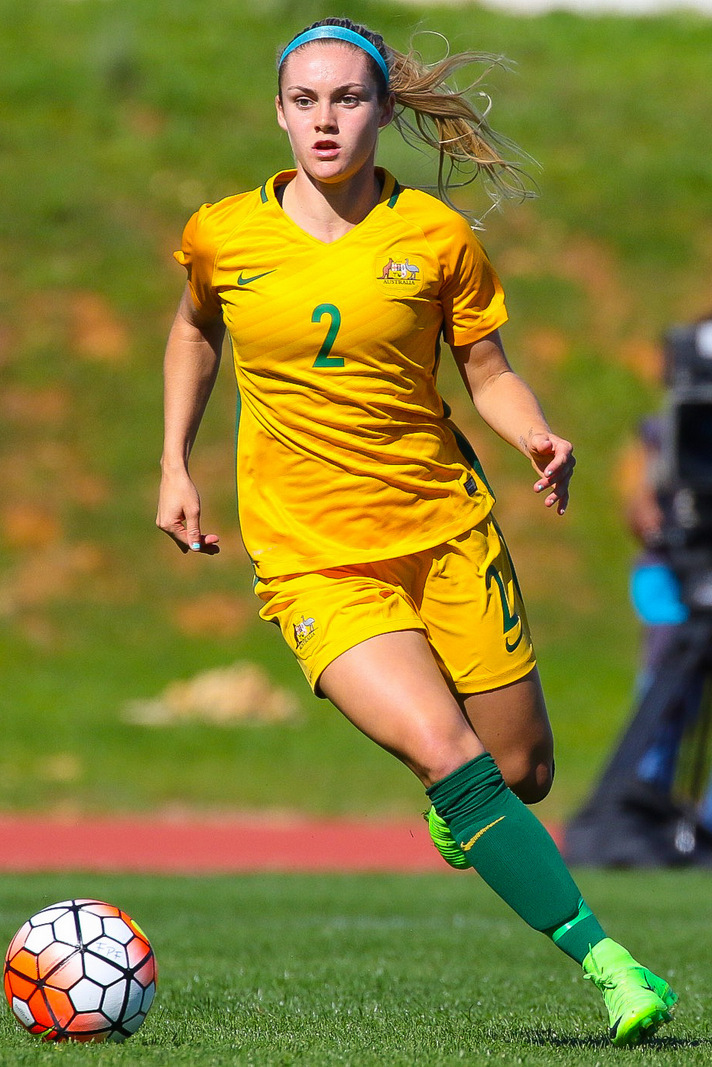
Ellie Carpenter has won the award three consecutive times.

Key
Player ^{X}	Name of the player and ^{X} the number of times they had won the award at that point (if more than one)
§	Denotes the club were W-League Champions in the same season
†	Indicates multiple award winners in the same season

Young Footballer of the Year winners
Season	Player	Nationality	Club	Reference
2008–09 †	Elise Kellond-Knight	Australia	Sydney FC	
2008–09 †	Ellyse Perry	Australia	Sydney FC	
2010–11	Kyah Simon	Australia	Sydney FC^{§}	
2011–12	Ashley Brown	Australia	Sydney FC	
2012–13	Steph Catley	Australia	Melbourne Victory	
2013–14	Steph Catley ^{(2)}	Australia	Melbourne Victory	
2014	Amy Harrison	Australia	Sydney FC	
2015–16	Larissa Crummer	Australia	Melbourne City^{§}	
2016–17	Remy Siemsen	Australia	Sydney FC	
2017–18	Ellie Carpenter	Australia	Canberra United FC	
2018–19	Ellie Carpenter ^{(2)}	Australia	Canberra United FC	
2019–20	Ellie Carpenter ^{(3)}	Australia	Melbourne City	
2020–21	Kyra Cooney-Cross	Australia	Melbourne Victory^{§}	
2021–22	Holly McNamara	Australia	Melbourne City	
2022–23	Sarah Hunter	Australia	Sydney FC^{§}	
2023–24	Daniela Galic	Australia	Melbourne City	
2024–25	Indiana Dos Santos	Australia	Sydney FC	
2025–26	Pia Vlok	New Zealand	Wellington Phoenix	

== See also ==
- List of sports awards honoring women
- W-League Golden Boot
- W-League records and statistics
- Julie Dolan Medal
