= Holly McNamara =

Australian soccer player (born 2003)

- McNamara in 2025

Personal information
- Full name: Holly Christina McNamara
- Date of birth: 23 January 2003 (age 23)
- Place of birth: Sydney, New South Wales, Australia
- Height: 1.62 m (5 ft 4 in)
- Position: Forward

Team information
- Current team: Everton
- Number: 9

Youth career
- Ermington United
- 2017–2021: FNSW Institute

Senior career*
Years	Team	Apps	(Gls)
2021–2026	Melbourne City	54	(38)
2022–2023	APIA Leichhardt	17	(10)
2026–	Everton	2	(0)

International career^{‡}
2018	Australia U20	2	(1)
2022–	Australia	22	(4)
- * Club domestic league appearances and goals as of 15 September 2026 ‡ National team caps and goals as of 13 October 2026

Holly Christina McNamara (/ˌmæk.nəˈmɑːr.ə/ MAK-nə-MAHR-ə; born 23 January 2003), sometimes known as Holly Mac, is an Australian soccer player who plays for Women's Super League club Everton and the Australia national team.

Across five seasons (2021–2026) for A-League Women's club Melbourne City the striker provided 38 goals from 54 appearances and helped her team to three Premierships (2023–24, 2024–25, 2025–26) while winning the league's Golden Boot award twice (2024–25, 2025–26).

== Early and personal life ==
McNamara was born in 2003 in Sydney, New South Wales. She played as a junior for Ermington United in the Granville & Districts Soccer Football Association. During 2016 she played for Blacktown Spartans under-13 alongside future national teammates, Bryleeh Henry and Jessika Nash.

== Club career ==
=== Youth ===
From 2017 to 2021 McNamara played for Football NSW Institute (FNSW Institute) in the National Premier Leagues NSW Women's (NPL NSW Women). During 2018 she ruptured her anterior cruciate ligament (ACL) for the first time. Her subsequent recovery was followed by the cancellation of remainder of NPL NSW Women's 2021 matches after August due to COVID-19 restrictions.

=== Melbourne City ===
In December 2021, McNamara made her A-League Women debut for Melbourne City in a 1–0 win over Canberra United, playing the full 90 minutes and scoring the game's only goal. In February 2022, McNamara had another ruptured ACL, in a match against Sydney FC, which shortened her debut season to eight appearances and four goals provided. Her team finished runners-up to the Premiers, Sydney and lost the Preliminary Final 1–3 against cross-town rivals, Melbourne Victory FC. Despite her abbreviated season McNamara was awarded A-League Women Young Footballer of the Year at the Dolan Warren Awards in May 2022. During the 2022 A-League off-season she joined APIA Leichhardt in the NPL NSW Women. She returned from injury in March 2023, during City's 2022–23 season, and appeared six times for one goal. Once again she played for APIA Leichhardt during A-League 2023 off-season.

During the 2023–24 season for Melbourne City, McNamara only played five matches kicking six goals, before she acquired her third ACL injury. This occurred on 19 November 2023, during her match against Newcastle Jets, where she had scored two goals. Melbourne City continued the season to become Premiers, and runners-up to Champions, Sydney, in the grand final in May 2024. McNamara returned to the squad in the 2024–25 season where she scored 15 goals in 17 appearances. Her tally included two hat-tricks: the first was against Western United on 4 February 2025, and the second against Adelaide United on 16 March. As the league's leading goalscorer for the season she was awarded the Golden Boot.

Melbourne City were Premiers again, but were eliminated in the two-leg semifinals against Central Coast Mariners, who were eventual Champions. As Premiers Melbourne City qualified for the inaugural AFC Women's Champions League joining at the 2024-25 group stage in Group B. After winning all three group matches they advanced to quarter-finals where they won 3–0 against Taichung Blue Whale with McNamara scoring the third goal from the penalty spot. In the final they finished runners-up by losing a penalty shoot-out 4–5 against Wuhan Jiangda after extra time being drawn 1–1.

After five seasons with Melbourne City, in June 2026, McNamara departed the club to pursue an opportunity overseas. At the time of her departure she was the club's all-time leading women's goalscorer with a tally of 45 goals in 66 appearances.

=== Everton ===
In July 2026, McNamara moved to England and signed for Women's Super League (WSL) club Everton ahead of the 2026–27 season. She was assigned the number nine jersey, which traditionally indicates the role of a starting striker, stating that she was "shocked" and "super privileged" to have received the honour. She made her competitive début for the club on 6 September 2026 in Everton's first WSL match of the season, starting and playing the entirety of the club's 1–0 defeat to Crystal Palace at Gander Green Lane in Sutton, London. In her home début on 13 September 2026, she forced English defender Leighanne Robe's own goal in the club's 1–0 win over newly-promoted Charlton Athletic at Goodison Park in Walton, Liverpool, their first victory of the season, and was subsequently named Player of the Match.

== International career ==
In June–July 2018, McNamara represented Australia women's national under-20 soccer team (Young Matildas) at the AFF Women's Championship, held in Indonesia. They competed against senior ASEAN teams. She debuted as a defender in their 9–0 defeat of East Timor and kicked her first goal for the team in a 12–0 victory against Cambodia. The Young Matildas reached the final, but lost 2–3 against Thailand. In August of that year she joined the Australia women's national under-17 soccer team (Junior Matildas) training camp ahead of their 2019 AFC U-16 Women's Championship qualification campaign, however she tore her ACL during a practice match before making her debut.

After an impactful early five games for Melbourne City FC, McNamara was called up for the Australia women's national soccer team (Matildas) for the first time. She participated in a training camp ahead of the 2022 AFC Women's Asian Cup, and on 17 January 2022, McNamara was selected for the tournament squad along with Cortnee Vine. She debuted for Australia in their opening match, an 18–0 defeat of Indonesia. The Matildas were eliminated in the quarterfinal's 0–1 loss against South Korea.

McNamara was recalled to the Matildas squad in April 2023 ahead of two friendlies against Scotland and England, in London. However, she was "medically withdrawn" and returned to Australia before the first match. She was named to the Matildas squad on 18 November 2023 for two international friendly matches against Canada. Days before she was set to link up with the squad, McNamara ruptured her ACL for the third time (see above).

On 4 February 2025, McNamara was named in the Matildas squad for the SheBelieves Cup in United States. After 1,119 days, McNamara made her return to the Matildas against Japan, coming on as a substitute in the 64th minute. She scored her first international goal for the Matildas against Slovenia in Perth on 26 June 2025.

=== International goals ===
As of match played 13 October 2026

Appearances and goals by national team and year
National team	Year	Apps	Goals
Australia	2022	3	0
Australia	2023	0	0
Australia	2024	0	0
Australia	2025	13	1
Australia	2026	6	3
Total		22	4

Scores and results list Australia's goal tally first, score column indicates score after each McNamara goal.

List of international goals scored by Holly McNamara
No.	Date	Venue	Opponent	Score	Result	Competition
1.	26 June 2025	HBF Park, Perth, Australia	Slovenia	2–0	3–0	Friendly
2.	11 April 2026	Nyayo National Stadium, Nairobi, Kenya	Malawi	4–0	5–0	2026 FIFA Series
3.	9 October 2026	Wildparkstadion, Karlsruhe, Germany	Germany	2–3	2–4	Friendly
4.	13 October 2026	Stade Walter-Luzi, Chambly, France	Haiti	7–1	7–1	Friendly

== Honours ==
Melbourne City

- A-League Women: Premiership: 2023–24, 2024–25, 2025–26

Runners-up: 2021–22

- A-League Women: Championship: 2026

Runners-up: 2024

- AFC Women's Champions League

Runners-up: 2024–25

Australia U20

- ASEAN Football Federation (AFF): Women's Championship

Runners-up: (2018)

Australia

- AFC Women's Asian Cup

Runners-up: 2026

- FIFA Series: 2026

Individual

- A-League Women: Young Footballer of the Year (2021–22)
- A-League Women: Golden Boot (2024–25, 2025–26)
