= Laura Hughes (footballer) =

Welsh footballer (born 2001)

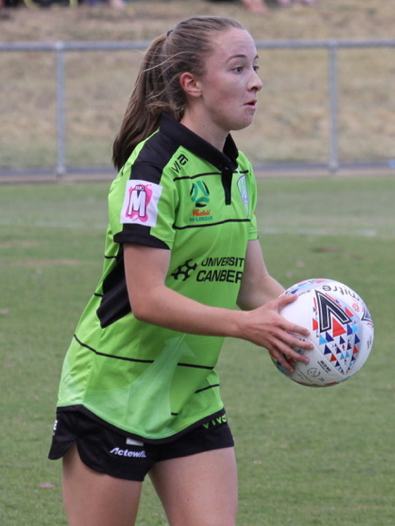
- Hughes with Canberra United in 2019

Personal information
- Date of birth: 6 June 2001 (age 25)
- Place of birth: Canberra, Australian Capital Territory, Australia
- Height: 1.60 m (5 ft 3 in)
- Position: Midfielder

Team information
- Current team: Southampton
- Number: 14

Senior career*
Years	Team	Apps	(Gls)
2016–2020	Canberra United	18	(1)
2020	Þróttur	15	(2)
2020–2023	Canberra United	44	(2)
2023	Manly United	10	(0)
2023–2026	Melbourne City	35	(3)
2026–	Southampton	0	(0)

International career^{‡}
2024	Australia U23	1	(0)
2024	Australia	1	(0)
2025–	Wales	1	(0)
- * Club domestic league appearances and goals as of 8 January 2025 ‡ National team caps and goals as of 2 December 2025

Laura Hughes (born 6 June 2001) is a footballer who plays as a midfielder for Women's Super League 2 club Southampton and the Wales national team. She has been capped once for Australia and changed international allegiance to Wales.

== Early life ==
Hughes was born on 6 June 2001 in Canberra, Australian Capital Territory. Being of Welsh descent, as a child she spent time in Wales, primarily in her mother's home town of Porthcawl in Bridgend. She finished high school at Erindale College in the Canberra suburb of Wanniassa.

== Club career ==
Hughes was born in Canberra, and was signed in 2016 from the Canberra academy, and also had played some games for the Junior Matildas. She made her debut on 18 December 2016, as a substitute in Canberra's 5–1 victory. This was her only appearance for the year.

In the 2018–19 season, Hughes played a more regular role for Canberra which culminated with her winning the club's rising star for the year.

She scored her first goal in a 3–1 victory over Adelaide at the end of the 2019–20 season.

Hughes briefly left Canberra to play for Þróttur in Iceland but shortly re-signed for Canberra United in time for the 2020–21 W-League. Hughes had created a video of highlights of her playing which had been sent to various Icelandic clubs, this then led to her being noticed by Nik Chamberlain, the manager of Þróttur at the time. Hughes had always intended her stay in Iceland to be short-term as, when asked about her plans for the following Australian summer, she responded with "I am planning to return to Australia in time for W-League. However, it depends on whether the new coach of Canberra United would like to offer me a spot in their squad."

In September 2020, she re-signed with Canberra United.

After seven seasons with Canberra United, Hughes joined Melbourne City. She departed Melbourne City in July 2026 to pursue an opportunity overseas.

On 31 July 2026, English Women's Super League 2 club Southampton announced the signing of Hughes.

== International career ==
=== Australia ===
In December 2024, Hughes was called-up to the Australian senior team for the first-time, as a replacement for Chloe Logarzo who was withdrawn due to a concussion. She made her senior international debut, coming on as a substitute during the 6–0 victory over Chinese Taipei.

=== Wales ===
In November 2025, Hughes was called-up by Wales for a camp in Spain, including two friendlies. Due the delay in processing her switch of allegiance, she did not appear for Wales against South Korea. Three days later, Hughes' request to switch international allegiance to Wales was approved by FIFA. She made her debut for Wales in a 3–2 victory over Switzerland on 2 December 2025.
