= Malena Mieres =

Spanish footballer (born 2000)

- Mieres playing for Melbourne City in 2026.

Personal information
- Full name: Malena Mieres García
- Date of birth: 29 March 2000 (age 26)
- Place of birth: As Pontes de García Rodríguez, Spain
- Position: Goalkeeper

Team information
- Current team: Melbourne City
- Number: 24

Senior career*
Years	Team	Apps	(Gls)
2015–2016	Friol		
2016–2019	Deportivo La Coruña		
2019–2022	Eibar	55	(0)
2022–2024	Real Betis	17	(0)
2024–	Melbourne City	29	(0)

International career
- Spain U19
Medal record
Representing Spain
UEFA Women's Under-19 Championship
First place	2018 Switzerland
- * Club domestic league appearances and goals as of 4 January 2026

Malena Mieres García (Spanish: [maˈlena ˈmjere̞s ɡaɾˈθi.a]; born 29 March 2000) is a Spanish professional footballer who plays as a goalkeeper for A-League Women club Melbourne City.

== Club career ==
Mieres started her career at Friol. In 2018, she was awarded the Best Galician Goalkeeper of the Year award.

In July 2024, Mieres joined Australian club Melbourne City.

== International career ==
Mieres has represented the Spain under-19 football team. With them, she won the 2018 UEFA Championship.
