= Song Duan =

Chinese footballer

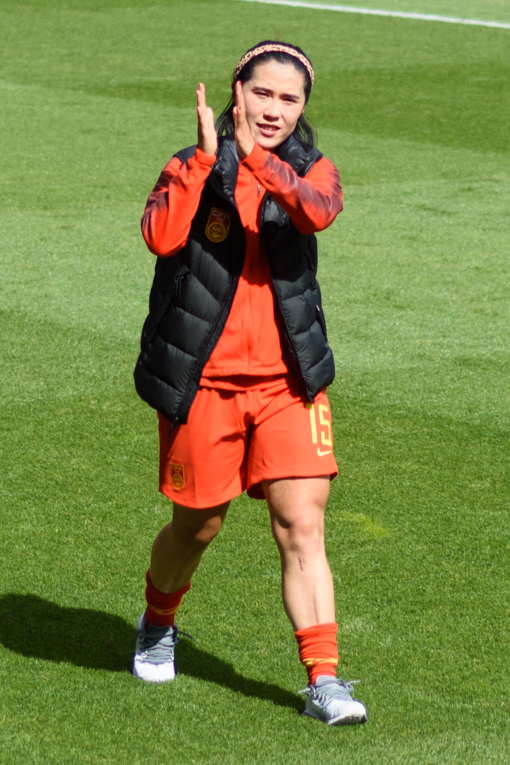

Personal information
- Full name: Song Duan
- Date of birth: 2 August 1995 (age 31)
- Place of birth: Dalian, China
- Height: 1.69 m (5 ft 7 in)
- Position: Striker

Team information
- Current team: Wuhan Jianghan University
- Number: 37

Senior career*
Years	Team	Apps	(Gls)
-2021	Dalian	1	(0)
2021-2022	Changchun Public Excellence	22	(1)
2023-	Wuhan Jianghan University	3	(0)

International career^{‡}
2017–	China	25	(7)
- * Club domestic league appearances and goals ‡ National team caps and goals as of 25 June 2019

Song Duan (Chinese: 宋端; pinyin: Sòng Duān; born 2 August 1995) is a female Chinese football player who is a striker for Wuhan Jianghan University.

== International goals ==
No.	Date	Venue	Opponent	Score	Result	Competition
1.	11 June 2017	Changzhou Olympic Sports Centre, Changzhou, China	Finland	4–2	4–2	Friendly
2.	19 January 2018	Century Lotus Stadium, Foshan, China	Vietnam	4–0	4–0	2018 Four Nations Tournament
3.	7 March 2018	VRS António Sports Complex, Vila Real de Santo António, Portugal	Russia	2–1	2–1	2018 Algarve Cup
4.	6 April 2018	Amman International Stadium, Amman, Jordan	Thailand	1–0	4–0	2018 AFC Women's Asian Cup
5.	6 April 2018	Amman International Stadium, Amman, Jordan	Thailand	4–0	4–0	2018 AFC Women's Asian Cup
6.	12 April 2018	Amman International Stadium, Amman, Jordan	Jordan	3–1	8–1	2018 AFC Women's Asian Cup
7.	20 April 2018	Amman International Stadium, Amman, Jordan	Thailand	3–0	3–1	2018 AFC Women's Asian Cup
8.	4 April 2019	Hankou Cultural Sports Centre, Wuhan, China	Russia	3–1	4–1	2019 Wuhan International Tournament

== Honours ==
Wuhan Jiangda

- AFC Women's Champions League: 2024–25
