= Leticia McKenna =

Australian soccer player

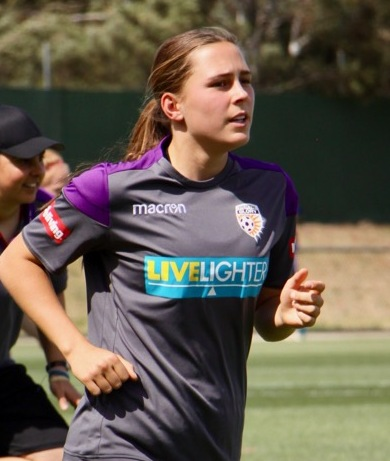
- McKenna with Perth Glory in 2018

Personal information
- Full name: Leticia Lee McKenna
- Date of birth: 7 August 2002 (age 24)
- Place of birth: Perth, Western Australia, Australia
- Position: Midfielder

Team information
- Current team: Nottingham Forest
- Number: 14

Youth career
- 2017–2019: FW NTC

Senior career*
Years	Team	Apps	(Gls)
2018–2020	Perth Glory	25	(3)
2020	FW NTC		
2020–2021	Brisbane Roar	12	(0)
2021–2026	Melbourne City	103	(14)
2021–2022	Blacktown Spartans		
2023	South Melbourne	8	(0)
2026–	Nottingham Forest	5	(3)

International career^{‡}
2022	Australia U20	3	(0)
2025	Australia U23	5	(2)
2026–	Australia	4	(3)
- * Club domestic league appearances and goals as of 15 November 2026 ‡ National team caps and goals as of 13 October 2026

Leticia Lee McKenna (born 7 August 2002) is an Australian soccer player who currently plays as a midfielder for Women's Super League 2 club Nottingham Forest and the Australia national team. She has previously played for Perth Glory, Brisbane Roar and Melbourne City. McKenna represented Australia in the Australia U20s and Australia U23s, as well as at senior level.

== Early life ==
McKenna was born on 7 August 2002. She is of Croatian descent. She grew up in the Perth suburb of Cockburn, with a younger sister, Tijan, who is also a soccer player. At six-years old she joined Cockburn City SC juniors. She represented Football West National Training Centre (FW NTC), which competes in the National Premier Leagues WA Women (NPL WA Women) at under-13, under-15 and under-19 before joining their seniors in 2017.

== Club career ==
As a 16-year-old McKenna debuted in the W-League (later known as A-League Women) 2018–19 season, for Perth Glory. She scored a goal on debut in November 2024: a 4–4 draw with Canberra United in round 2. Overall she played 12 matches and scored two goals in her first season. McKenna was also a member of Perth's 2–4 winning semi-final team against league premiers, Melbourne Victory in February 2019, where she provided an assist for their star striker, Sam Kerr's third goal. McKenna was one of the teens in the team, who received praise from Kerr for her abilities and maturity. The team finished runners-up to champions Sydney FC; McKenna was named Western Australia's Female Footballer of the Year in February 2019.

McKenna was also an ambassador for the 2019 Smarter than Smoking Kicking Off Healthy Clubs initiative.

In McKenna's second season (2019–20) at Perth Glory, she scored one goal across 12 games. In November 2020, the midfielder signed with Brisbane Roar for the 2020–21 W-League season, where she played 12 games and helped Brisbane reach runners-up in the league. During 2021-2022 A-League off-season she played for Blacktown Spartans (women) in the National Premier Leagues NSW Women's (NPL NSW Women's).

In September 2021, McKenna joined Melbourne City, for the 2021–22 season initially on a two-year contract. By the end of their 2025–26 season, she had scored 14 goals across 103 appearances for City, and a total of 17 goals from 140 appearances for various A-League Women clubs from 2018 to 2026.. At 22 years 143 days old, she holds the record for the youngest A-League Women player to reach 100 appearances on 28 December 2024.

After that season, McKenna won the Australian PFA Young Player of the Year for 2026.

On 4 September 2026, McKenna was announced at Nottingham Forest, joining compatriot Alana Murphy. She made her WSL2 Debut against Southampton on 27 September, coming on for Tove Almqvist. She subsequently scored a brace against Newcastle in a 2-2 draw on 25 October. As a result of her performances in October, she was nominated for WSL2 Goal of the Month and WSL2 Fans' Player of the Month.

== International career ==
McKenna played two games for the Australia women's national under-20 soccer team (Young Matildas) during the first round of qualifiers in Lebanon in for the 2019 AFC U-19 Women's Championship. She was named to the Young Matildas for two friendlies against New Zealand and then a training camp in mid-May 2022. However, she was dropped from the final squad for the 2022 FIFA U-20 Women's World Cup held in Costa Rica in August of that year.

McKenna joined the 23-player squad for the Australia women's national under-23 soccer team (U23 Matildas), which competed at the 2025 ASEAN Women's Championship in Vietnam from 6 to 19 August. She scored in her team's 9–0 defeat of Timor Leste to reach the semi-finals. McKenna kicked the second goal in the 2–1 win against Vietnam in that match on 16 August, and helped Australia U23 win the final against Myanmar and become ASEAN Champions.

McKenna received her first call-up to the senior national team (Matildas) for the 2026 FIFA Series in Nairobi, Kenya, held on 11 and 15 April. She scored her debut goal on 11 April, in a 5–0 defeat of fellow visitors, Malawi.

== International goals ==
As of match played 13 October 2026

Appearances and goals by national team and year
National team	Year	Apps	Goals
Australia	2026	4	3
Total		4	3

Scores and results list Australia's goal tally first, score column indicates score after each McKenna goal.

List of international goals scored by Leticia McKenna
No.	Date	Venue	Opponent	Score	Result	Competition
1.	11 April 2026	Nyayo National Stadium, Nairobi, Kenya	Malawi	5–0	5–0	2026 FIFA Series
2.	13 October 2026	Stade Walter-Luzi, Chambly, France	Haiti	1–0	7–1	Friendly
3.	13 October 2026	Stade Walter-Luzi, Chambly, France	Haiti	2–1	7–1	Friendly

== Honours ==
Regional

- ASEAN Women's Championship: Australia U23: (2025)

Club

- A-League Women: Premiers: Melbourne City (2023–24, 2024–25, 2025–26), Runners-up: Melbourne City (2020–21)
- A-League Women: Champions: Melbourne City (2026), Runners-up: Perth Glory (2019)

Individual

- Football West: Female Footballer of the Year: 2019
