= Mariana Speckmaier =

Venezuelan footballer (born 1997)

- Speckmaier with Melbourne City at BG Stadium in 2024

Personal information
- Full name: Mariana Sofía Speckmaier Fernández
- Date of birth: 26 December 1997 (age 28)
- Place of birth: Miami, Florida, United States
- Height: 1.65 m (5 ft 5 in)
- Position: Forward

Team information
- Current team: Heart of Midlothian
- Number: 9

Youth career
- Boca United FC
- MAST Makos
- U11-U15: Sunrise Soccer Club

College career
Years	Team	Apps	(Gls)
2017–2020	Clemson Tigers	65	(25)

Senior career*
Years	Team	Apps	(Gls)
2021	Washington Spirit	3	(0)
2022	CSKA Moscow	0	(0)
2022–2023	Valur	11	(1)
2023	Washington Spirit	5	(1)
2023–2024	Wellington Phoenix	21	(10)
2024–2025	Melbourne City	22	(7)
2025–2026	Durham	17	(4)
2026–	Heart of Midlothian	1	(2)

International career^{‡}
2016	Venezuela U20	3	(1)
2021–	Venezuela	34	(4)
- * Club domestic league appearances and goals as of 17 August 2026 ‡ National team caps and goals as of 6 June 2025

Mariana Sofía Speckmaier Fernández (born 26 December 1997) is a professional footballer who plays as a forward for Scottish Women's Premier League (SWPL) club Heart of Midlothian. Born and raised in the United States to Venezuelan parents, she plays for the Venezuela national team.

== Early life ==
Speckmaier was born in Florida and lives in Miami.

== High school and college career ==
Speckmaier has attended the MAST Academy in Miami, Florida and the Clemson University in Clemson, South Carolina.

== Club career ==
In January 2021, Speckmaier was selected by Washington Spirit in the 2021 NWSL Draft.

On 21 February 2022, Speckmaier signed for Russian club CSKA Moscow on a two-year contract. As three days later began the 2022 Russian invasion of Ukraine, she did not join the club and the deal was aborted.

In May 2022, Speckmaier signed with Valur. She made six appearances for the club.

On 28 June 2023, Washington Spirit re-signed Speckmaier to a short-term national team replacement contract.

In August 2023, Speckmaier joined New Zealand club Wellington Phoenix.

Speckmaier played for Melbourne City in the 2024-25 A-League Premiership season and was a part of the squad which won the title and went undefeated during the regular season, as she contributed 11 goals in 28 appearances overall for the club.

On 13 August 2025, it was announced that Speckmaier had joined WSL2 side Durham, transferring for an undisclosed fee from Melbourne City. She scored in her competitive debut with Durham on 7 September 2025 in a 2–0 win over Portsmouth.

On 13 July 2026, Speckmaier was announced at Heart of Midlothian.

== International career ==
Speckmaier represented Venezuela at the 2016 FIFA U-20 Women's World Cup. She made her senior debut on 8 April 2021.

== Career statistics ==
=== International goals ===
Scores and results list Venezuela's goal tally first.

No.	Date	Venue	Opponent	Score	Result	Competition
1.	6 April 2023	Estadio Mario Alberto Kempes, Córdoba, Argentina	Argentina	1–0	1–1	Friendly
2.	3 June 2025	Estadio Nuevo Mirador, Algeciras, Spain	New Zealand	1–0	1–2	Friendly

== Honors ==
Washington Spirit

- NWSL Championship: 2021

Melbourne City

- A-League Women: Premiership: 2024–25
- AFC Women's Champions League
  - Runners-up: 2024–25

Individual

- A-League Women Player of the Month: March 2024
