= Bryleeh Henry =

Australian soccer player

Personal information
- Full name: Bryleeh Flo Henry
- Date of birth: 5 May 2003 (age 23)
- Place of birth: Australia
- Position: Forward

Team information
- Current team: Rosengård
- Number: 26

Youth career
- Football NSW-FNSW Institute

Senior career*
Years	Team	Apps	(Gls)
2020–2022	Western Sydney Wanderers	22	(3)
2022	Blacktown Spartans	8	(2)
2022–2026	Melbourne City	59	(9)
2023	Bulls Academy	3	(1)
2026–	Rosengård	0	(0)

International career^{‡}
2019	Australia U17	1	(0)
2022	Australia U20	6	(2)
2021–	Australia	6	(1)
- * Club domestic league appearances and goals as of 17 May 2025 ‡ National team caps and goals as of 10 July 2025

Bryleeh Flo Henry (born 5 May 2003) is an Australian soccer player who plays for Rosengård in the Damallsvenskan and the Australia national team.

== Club career ==
=== Western Sydney Wanderers ===
In December 2020, Henry joined A-League Women club Western Sydney Wanderers ahead of the 2020–21 W-League season. A couple of weeks later, she made her debut for the club in a 3–0 loss to Sydney FC, starting the match and playing 76 minutes before being subbed off. In August 2021, the club re-signed Henry for the 2021–22 A-League Women season.

=== Melbourne City ===
In September 2022, Henry joined fellow A-League Women club Melbourne City on a two-year contract.

In June 2026, Henry departed Melbourne City at the conclusion of her contract to pursue an opportunity overseas.

=== Rosengård ===
In June 2026, Henry signed a two-year deal with Swedish club Rosengård.

== International career ==
Henry was a part of the Junior Matildas team during the 2019 AFC U-16 Women's Championship. She featured during one match of the tournament, playing the full 90 minutes in a 0–0 draw with Japan. On 21 November 2020, Henry was called up for the first ever Women's Talent Identification Camp which was held in Canberra from 22 – 26 of November 2020.

Henry was part of the Australia U20 (Young Matildas) at the 2022 FIFA U-20 Women's World Cup playing in all three games against Costa Rica U20, Brazil U20 and Spain U20. Henry scored a goal against home side Costa Rica.

On 23 October 2021, 18-year-old Henry made her senior Australian national team (Matildas) debut, coming on as a substitute in the 90th minute. Henry scored her first international goal on 4 December 2024, in the Matildas 3-1 win over Chinese Taipei at AAMI Park.

The forward was named in the Australia U23 squad by coach Joe Palatsides for the 2025 ASEAN Women's Championship on 30 July 2025. However, due to illness Henry was ruled out before the tournament started and was replaced by Abbey Lemon (from Sydney FC).

== International goals ==
No.	Date	Venue	Opponent	Score	Result	Competition
1.	4 December 2024	AAMI Park, Melbourne, Australia	Chinese Taipei	3–1	3–1	Friendly
