= List of Melbourne City FC (women) players =

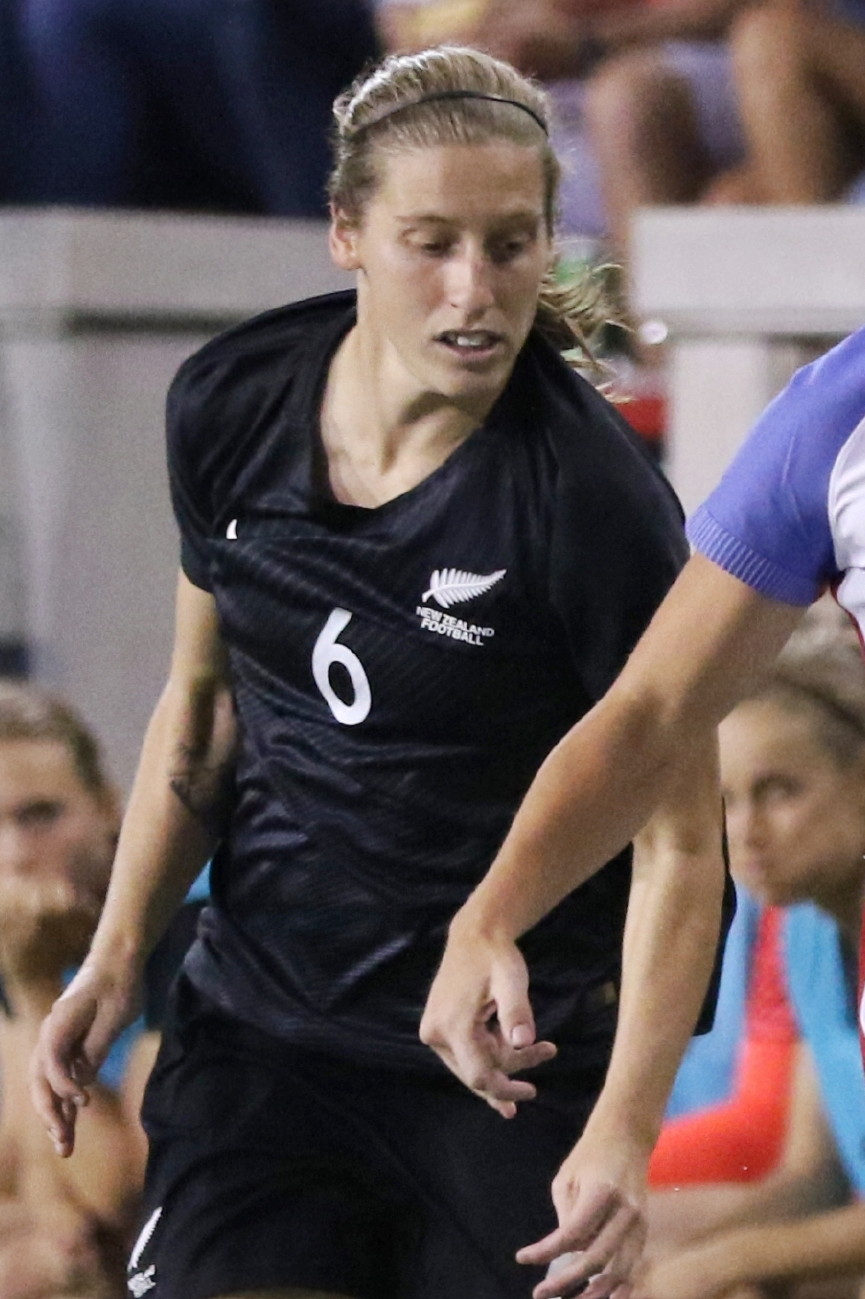
Rebekah Stott has played 112 times for Melbourne City (women), more than any other player.

Melbourne City Football Club (women), a women's association football club based Cranbourne East, Melbourne, was founded in 2015 in Bundoora. The club's first team has competed in the A-League Women and all players who have played in at least one match are listed below.

Rebekah Stott holds the record for the greatest number of appearances for Melbourne City (women). Between 2015 and 2024, she has currently played 124 times for the club. The club's goalscoring record is held by Hannah Wilkinson, who has scored 30 goals between 2021 and 2024.

== Key ==
- The list is ordered first by date of debut, and then if necessary in alphabetical order.
- Appearances as a substitute are included.
- Statistics are correct up to and including the match played on 21 May 2025. Where a player left the club permanently after this date, her statistics are updated to her date of leaving.

Positions key
GK	Goalkeeper
DF	Defender
MF	Midfielder
FW	Forward

Nationality
Unless otherwise noted, the nationality of a player is determined by the country/countries which he has played for, or if said person has not played international football, their country of birth.
Position
Playing positions are listed according to the tactical formations that were employed at the time.
Club career
Club career is defined as the first and last calendar years in which the player appeared for the club in any of the competitions listed below.
Total appearances and Total goals
Total appearances and goals comprise those in the W-League/A-League Women regular season and finals series and AFC Women's Champions League.

== Players ==
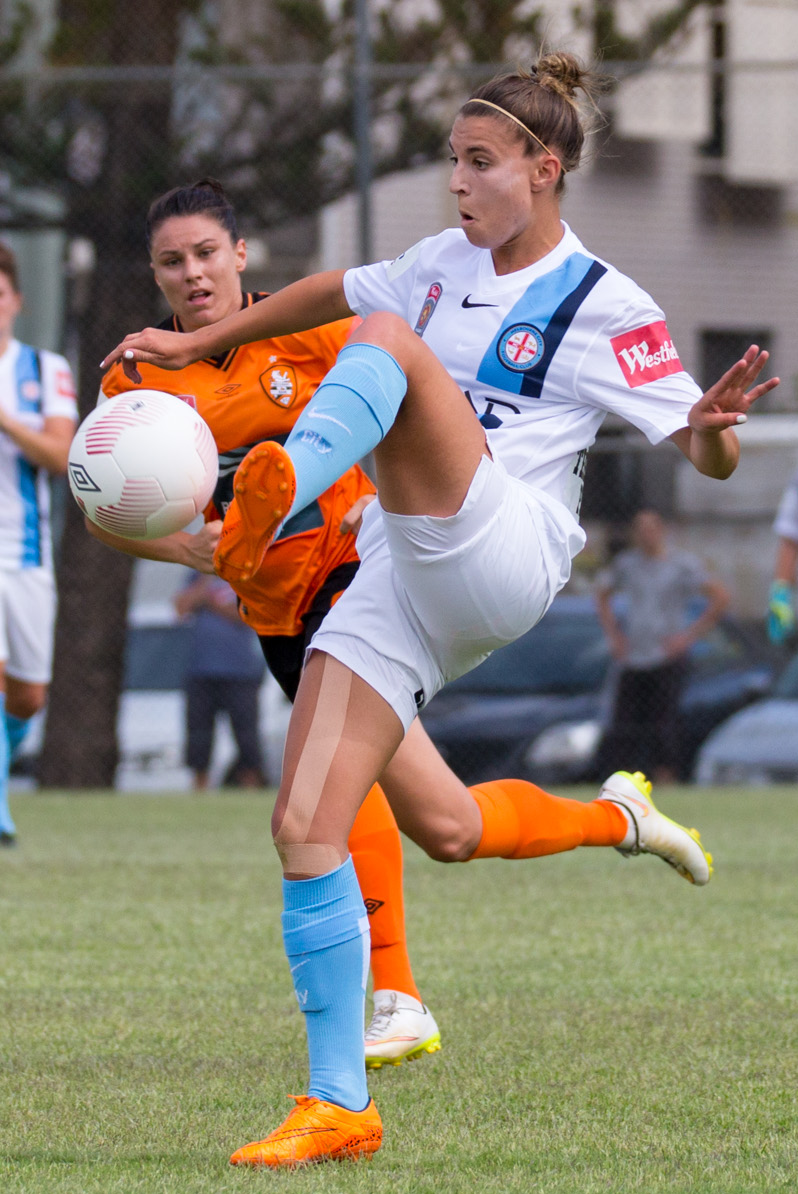
Steph Catley part of the club's debut match, captained the club over 62 appearances.

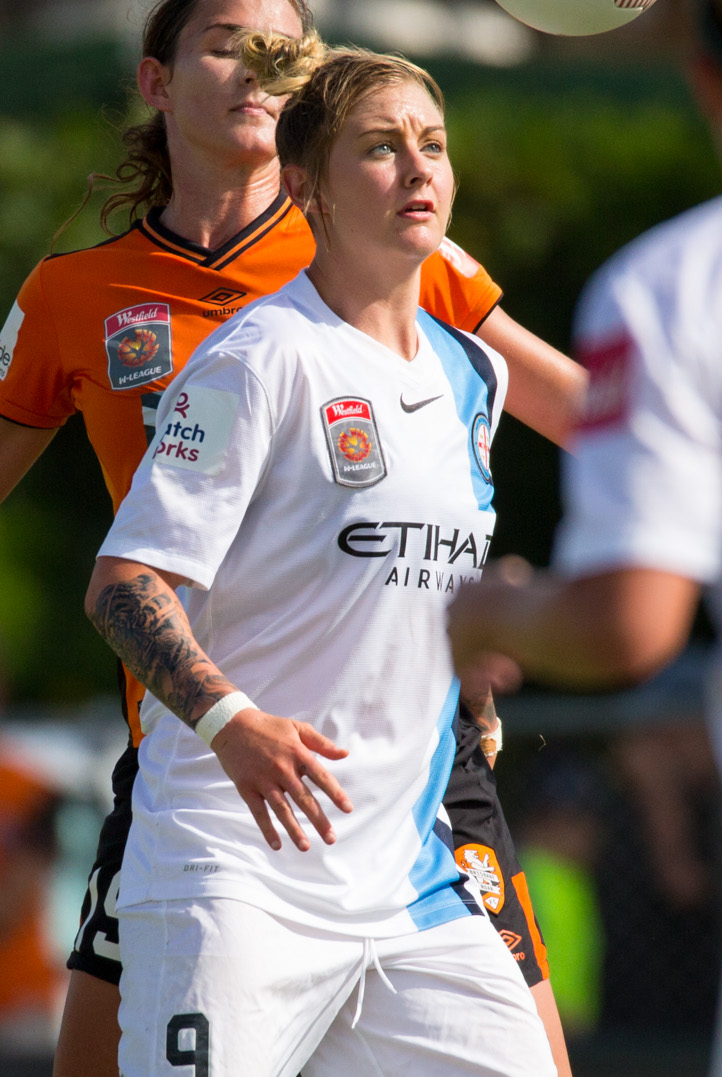
Larissa Crummer scored 14 goals, over 23 appearances for the club.

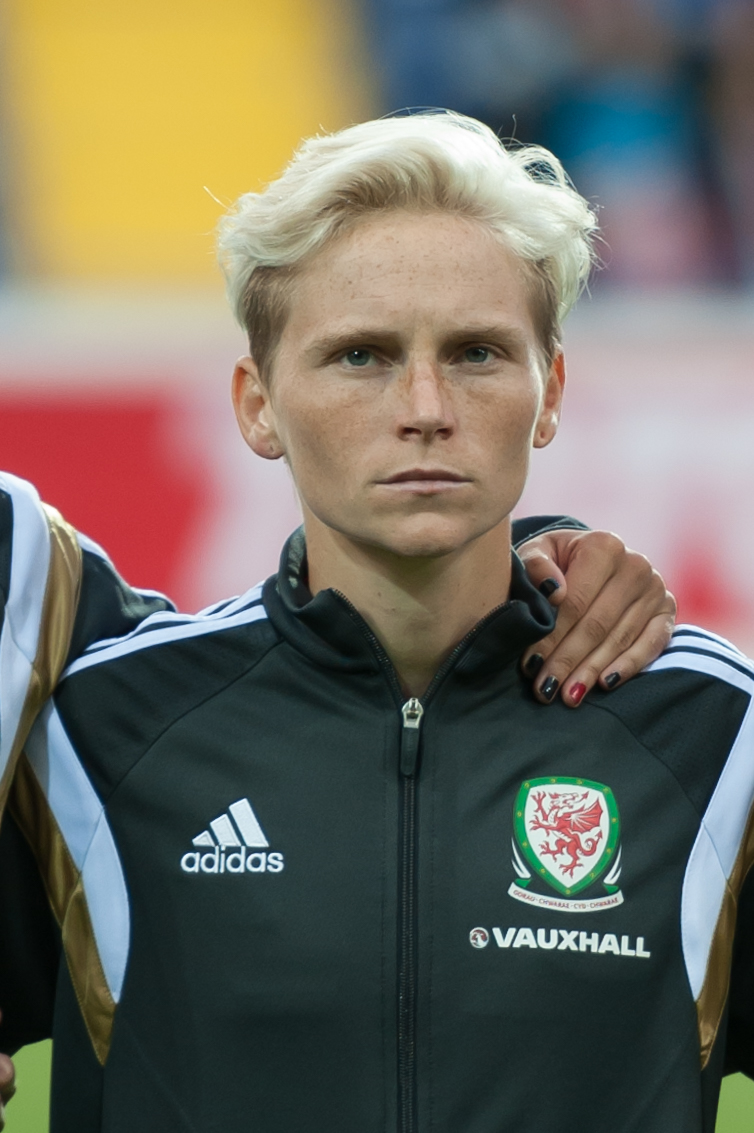
Welsh international Jess Fishlock is the third top goalscorer for the club and was a player-coach in 2017.

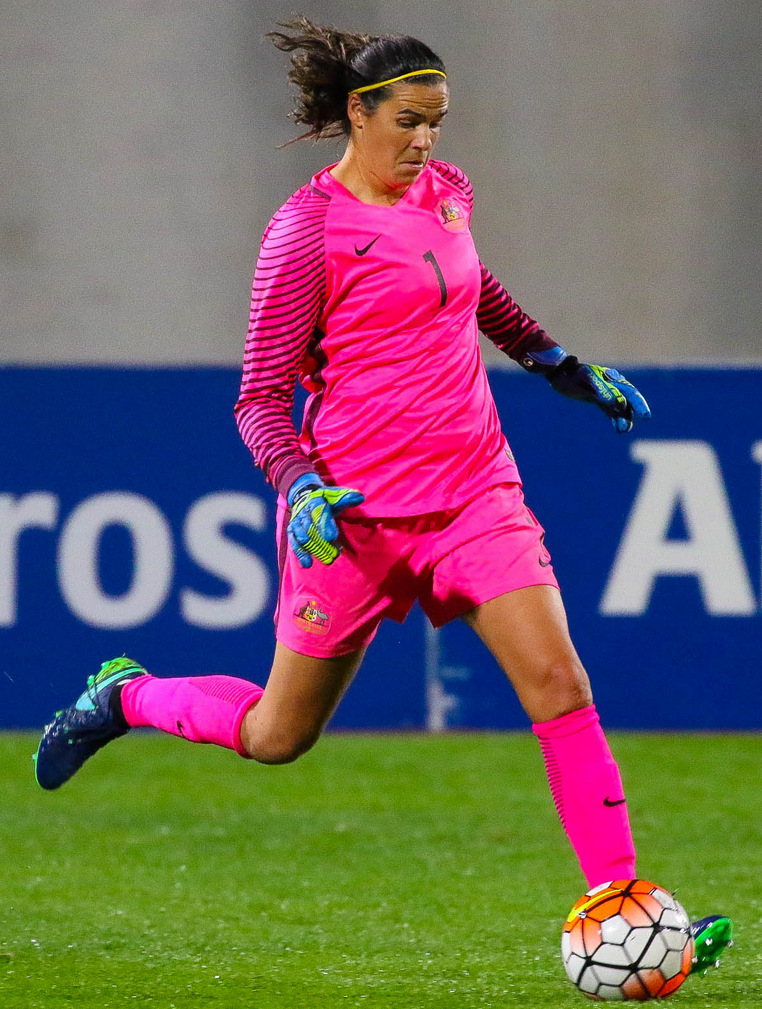
Lydia Williams has made 52 appearances, most as a goalkeeper for the club.

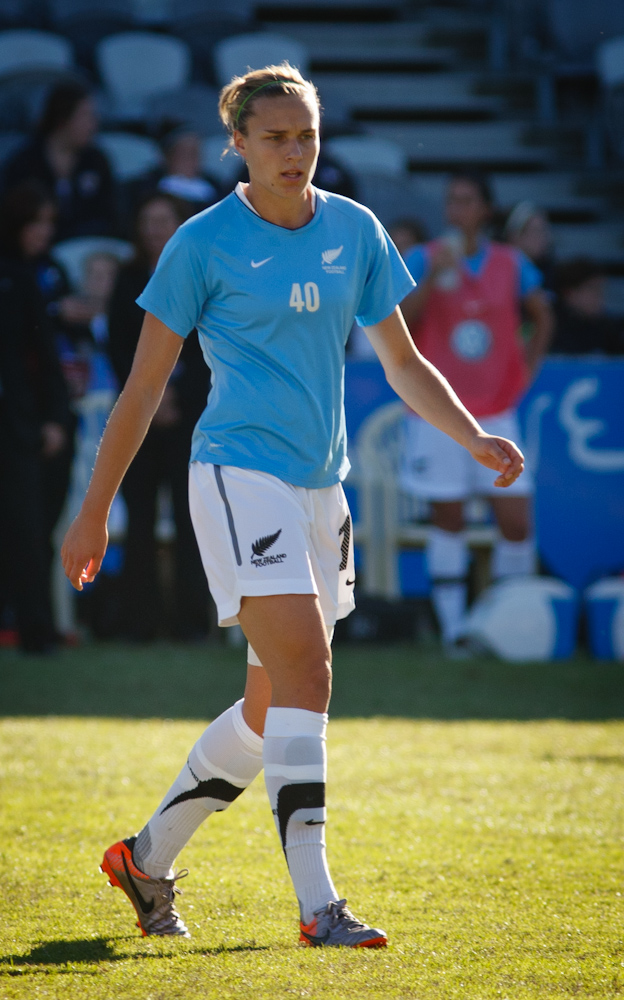
Hannah Wilkinson joining the club in 2021, has scored the most of 30 goals in 51 appearances.

Players highlighted in bold are still actively playing at Melbourne City (women).

List of Melbourne City FC (women) players
Player	Nationality	Pos	Club career	Starts	Subs	Total	Goals	Ref.
Player	Nationality	Pos	Club career	Appearances			Goals	Ref.
Laura Alleway	Australia	DF	2015–2017	23	2	25	1	
Melina Ayres	Australia	FW	2015–2017	4	12	16	2	
Trudy Burke	Australia	GK	2015	7	0	7	0	
Steph Catley	Australia	DF	2015–2020	62	0	62	3	
Alex Chidiac	Australia	MF	2015–2016; 2021	12	8	20	3	
Larissa Crummer	Australia	FW	2015–2018	19	4	23	14	
Olivia Ellis	Australia	DF	2015	0	2	2	0	
Beatrice Goad	Australia	MF	2015–2016	10	4	14	4	
Anisa Guajardo	Mexico	FW	2015–2016	2	5	7	0	
Amy Jackson	Australia	MF	2015–2019	26	17	43	1	
Aivi Luik	Australia	MF	2015–2020	48	1	49	6	
**Rebekah Stott**	New Zealand	DF	2015–2017; 2017–2019; 2019–2020; 2021–2022; 2023–	123	1	124	7	
Marianna Tabain	Australia	FW	2015–2017	21	6	27	10	
Lisa De Vanna	Australia	FW	2015–2016	8	1	9	3	
Hannah Brewer	Australia	DF	2015	1	0	1	0	
Racheal Quigley	Australia	FW	2015	1	0	1	0	
Tessa Sernio	Australia	MF	2015	0	1	1	0	
**Tyla-Jay Vlajnic**	Serbia	DF	2015–2022; 2024–	46	35	81	3	
Jennifer Beattie	Scotland	DF	2015–2016	11	1	12	2	
Jess Fishlock	Wales	MF	2015–2018	38	0	38	17	
Kim Little	Australia	MF	2015–2016	11	1	12	9	
Brianna Davey	Australia	GK	2015–2016	7	0	7	0	
Teigen Allen	Australia	DF	2016–2017; 2020–2021	15	4	19	0	
Lauren Barnes	United States	MF	2016–2020	51	1	52	0	
Jacynta Galabadaarachchi	Australia	FW	2016–2017	1	4	5	0	
Erika Tymrak	United States	MF	2016–2017	10	4	14	2	
Lydia Williams	Australia	GK	2016–2017; 2017–2018; 2018–2019; 2019–2020	52	0	52	0	
Beverley Yanez	United States	FW	2016–2017	10	1	11	2	
Ashley Hatch	United States	FW	2017–2018	13	1	14	2	
Alanna Kennedy	Australia	DF	2017–2018	14	0	14	1	
Emily Kenshole	Australia	GK	2017	1	0	1	0	
Yukari Kinga	Japan	DF	2017–2020	37	0	37	6	
Kyah Simon	Australia	FW	2017–2020	29	2	31	10	
Rhali Dobson	Australia	FW	2017–2021	25	21	46	4	
Lia Muldeary	Australia	MF	2017; 2021	0	5	5	0	
Sofia Sakalis	Australia	MF	2017–2019	0	5	5	0	
**Melissa Barbieri**	Australia	GK	2017–	33	6	39	0	
Jodie Taylor	England	FW	2017–2018	3	3	6	2	
Chelsea Blissett	Australia	DF	2018–2023	15	29	44	0	
Helen Caceres	Australia	FW	2018–2019	7	4	11	1	
Sarah Langman	Australia	FW	2018–2019	2	8	10	1	
Janna Lawson	Australia	FW	2018	1	0	1	0	
Aimee Medwin	Australia	DF	2018	0	1	1	0	
Theresa Nielsen	Denmark	DF	2018–2019	12	0	12	0	
Jasmyne Spencer	United States	FW	2018–2019	11	0	11	4	
Nia Stamatopoulos	Australia	MF	2018	1	3	4	0	
Elise Kellond-Knight	Australia	MF	2018–2019	11	0	11	2	
Tameka Yallop	Australia	MF	2018–2019	10	0	10	3	
Hailie Mace	United States	DF	2019	1	1	2	1	
Ellie Carpenter	Australia	DF	2019–2020	14	0	14	2	
Emma Checker	Australia	FW	2019–2023	50	4	54	2	
Emily van Egmond	Australia	MF	2019–2020	14	0	14	6	
Claire Emslie	Scotland	FW	2019–2020	12	0	12	5	
Milica Mijatović	Serbia	FW	2019–2020	9	5	14	5	
Ally Watt	United States	FW	2020	1	4	5	0	
Sarah Cain	Australia	MF	2020–2021	3	3	6	0	
**Leah Davidson**	Australia	DF	2020–	73	11	84	0	
Samantha Johnson	United States	DF	2020–2021	8	3	11	1	
Jenna McCormick	Australia	DF	2020–2021	10	0	10	1	
Teagan Micah	Australia	GK	2020–2021	8	0	8	0	
Hollie Palmer	Australia	DF	2020–2021	8	0	8	0	
Margot Robinne	Australia	MF	2020–2021	2	3	5	0	
Tori Tumeth	Australia	DF	2020–2022	26	2	28	1	
Harriet Withers	Australia	FW	2020–2021	4	4	8	1	
Chinatsu Kira	Japan	FW	2021	10	1	11	0	
Julia Sardo	Australia	FW	2021	0	2	2	0	
Noor Eckhoff	Norway	MF	2020–2021	7	0	7	0	
Naomi Chinnama	Australia	DF	2021–2024	30	13	43	0	
Winonah Heatley	Australia	DF	2021–2022	15	0	15	1	
Darcey Malone	Australia	MF	2021–2023	2	19	21	0	
**Leticia McKenna**	Australia	MF	2021–	58	27	85	7	
**Holly McNamara**	Australia	FW	2021–	31	9	40	27	
**Rhianna Pollicina**	Australia	MF	2021–	71	14	85	29	
Kaitlyn Torpey	Australia	MF	2021–2024	47	1	48	6	
Meisha Westland	Australia	DF	2021–2022	3	9	12	0	
Hannah Wilkinson	New Zealand	FW	2021–2024	47	4	51	30	
**Isabella Accardo**	Australia	MF	2022–	0	13	13	0	
**Caitlin Karic**	Australia	DF	2022–	2	27	29	2	
Coco Majstorovic	Australia	GK	2022	0	1	1	0	
Marisa van der Meer	Australia	MF	2022	0	10	10	0	
Sally James	Australia	GK	2022–2023	13	3	16	0	
Katie Bowen	New Zealand	DF	2022–2023	19	0	19	0	
Emina Ekic	Bosnia and Herzegovina	FW	2022; 2023–2024	23	4	27	12	
Daniela Galic	Australia	MF	2022–2024	32	7	39	9	
Julia Grosso	United States	DF	2022–2024	30	7	37	2	
**Bryleeh Henry**	Australia	FW	2022–	41	23	64	9	
María José Rojas	Chile	FW	2022–2023	10	1	11	4	
**Karly Roestbakken**	Australia	MF	2022–	36	13	49	0	
**Sophia Varley**	Australia	GK	2023–	0	1	1	0	
**Laura Hughes**	Australia	MF	2023–	53	1	54	4	
Tijan McKenna	Australia	MF	2023–2024	6	12	18	0	
**Taylor Otto**	United States	DF	2023–	53	0	53	6	
Lysianne Proulx	Canada	GK	2023–2024	14	0	14	0	
**Kiera Meyers**	Australia	FW	2023–	3	11	14	0	
Leia Varley	Australia	FW	2023–2024	3	2	5	0	
Bárbara	Brazil	GK	2024	7	0	7	0	
**Shelby McMahon**	Australia	MF	2024–	6	24	30	3	
**Alexia Apostolakis**	Australia	MF	2024–	29	1	30	2	
**Lourdes Bosch**	Mexico	MF	2024–	23	5	28	7	
**Malena Mieres**	Spain	GK	2024–	28	0	28	0	
**Emilia Murray**	Australia	MF	2024–	0	9	9	0	
**Mariana Speckmaier**	Venezuela	FW	2024–	25	2	27	11	
**Kathryn Harvey**	Canada	FW	2024–	9	6	15	3	
