= Melbourne City FC Player of the Year =

Award

Melbourne City Player of the Year
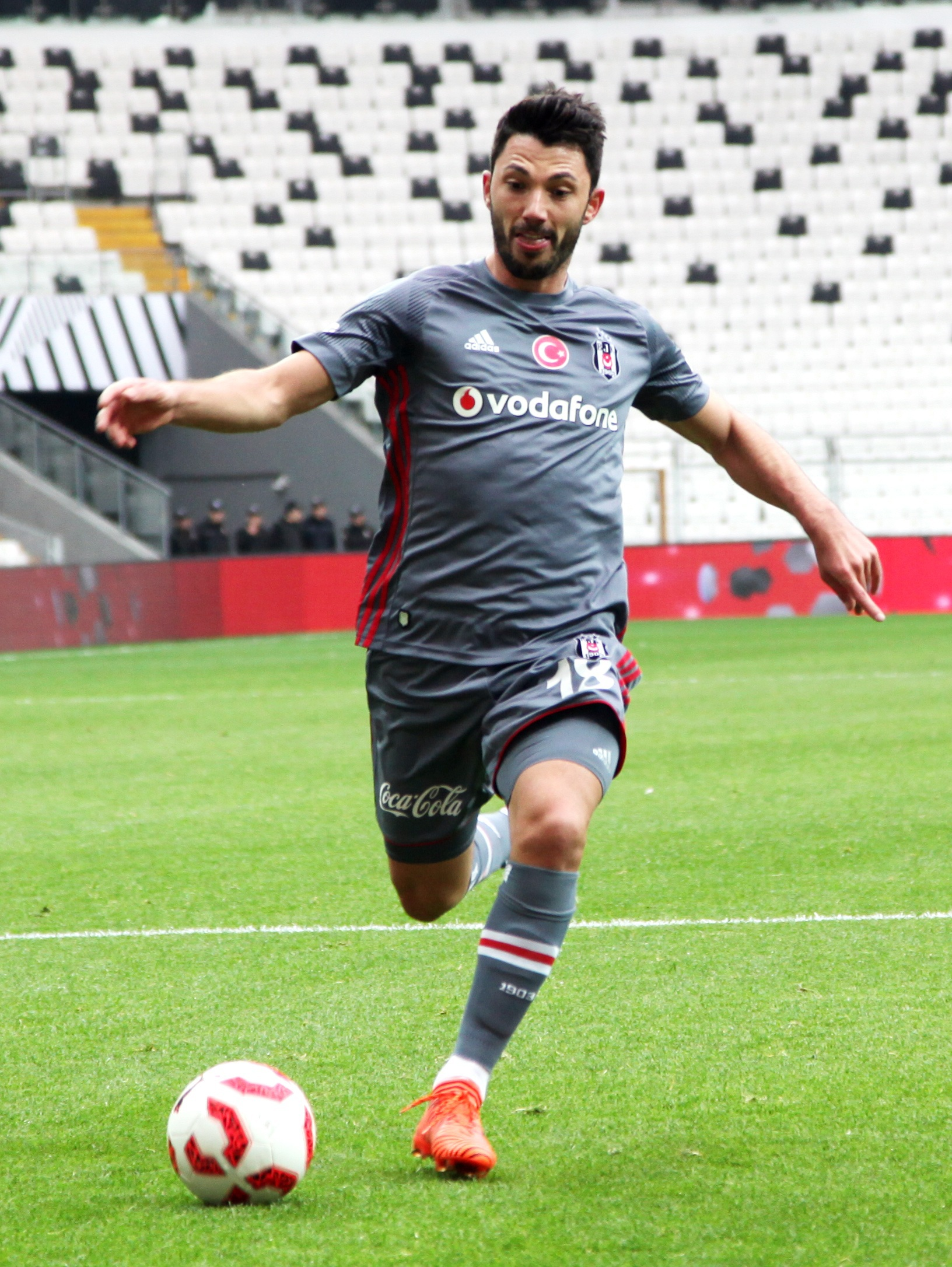
- Tolgay Arslan was the men's award winner for 2023–24.
- Sport: Association football
- Awarded for: being the best performing Melbourne City player over the course of a season
- Presented by: Melbourne City FC

History
- First award: 2011; 15 years ago (men's); 2016; 10 years ago (women's)
- Editions: 16 (men's) / 11 (women's) (as of 2026)
- First winner: (Australia) Clint Bolton (men's) (Australia) Aivi Luik (women's)
- Most recent: (Australia) Aziz Behich (men's) (New Zealand) Rebekah Stott (women's)

The Melbourne City Player of the Year award, more commonly known as the Scott Jamieson Medal (Note: Name used for men's award.) is an official award given by Melbourne City Football Club to the best performing player (men's and women's) from the club over the course of the season.

The inaugural men's award was handed to Clint Bolton in 2011, and the inaugural women's award was handed to Aivi Luik in 2016.

Aziz Behich is the most recent men's winner of the award, following the 2025–26 men's season and Rebekah Stott is the most recent women's winner of the award, following the 2025–26 women's season.

== Men's award recipients ==
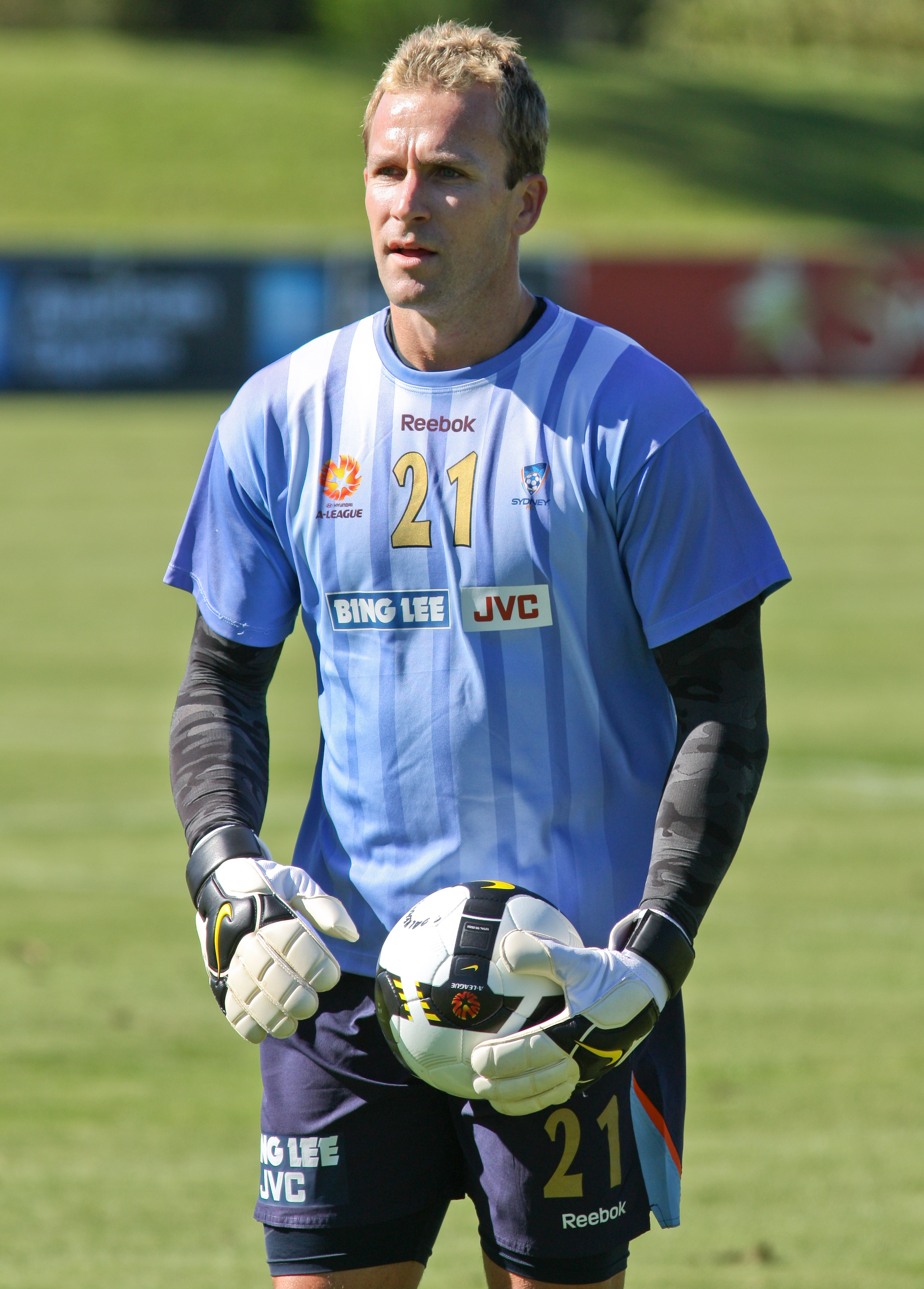
Clint Bolton won the inaugural and back-to-back awards in 2010 and 2011.

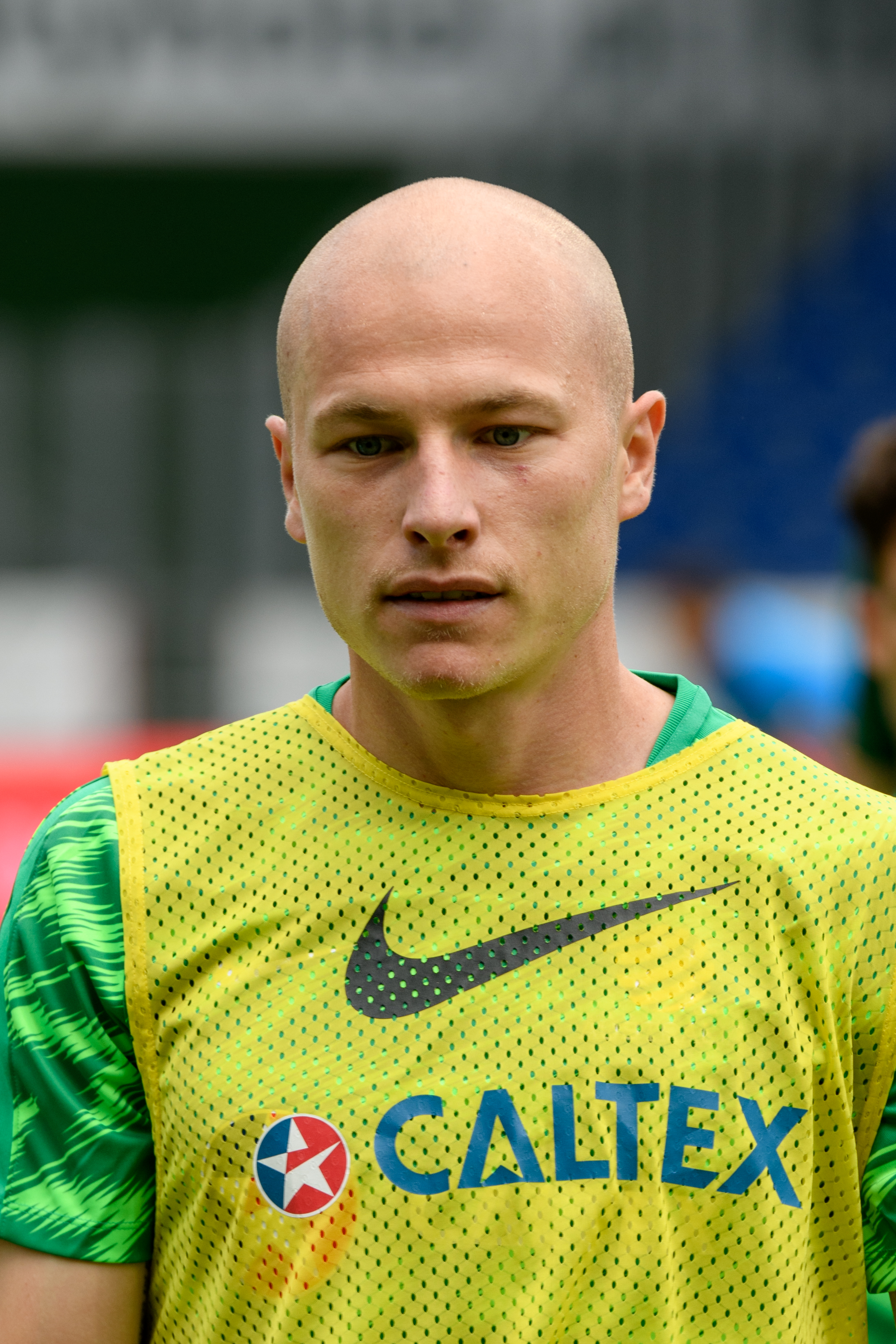
Aaron Mooy became the second and only other player to win the award twice.

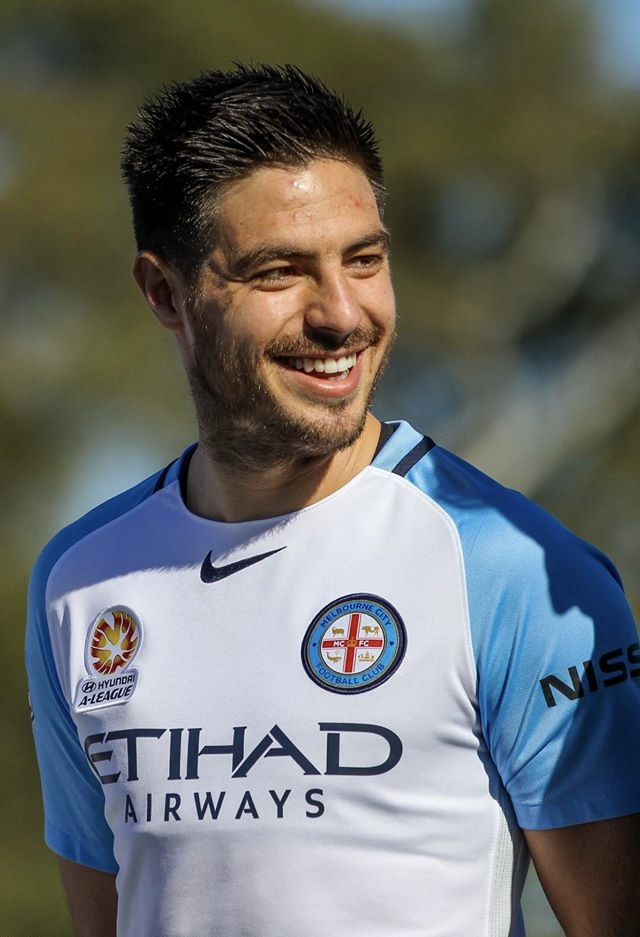
Bruno Fornaroli was the first foreigner to win the award.

Players in bold are still playing for Melbourne City

Men's award recipients
Season	Player	Nationality	Position	Ref.
2010–11	Clint Bolton	Australia	Goalkeeper	
2011–12	Clint Bolton (2)	Australia	Goalkeeper	
2012–13	Richard Garcia	Australia	Forward	
2013–14	David Williams	Australia	Forward	
2014–15	Aaron Mooy	Australia	Midfielder	
2015–16	Bruno Fornaroli	Uruguay	Forward	
2015–16	Aaron Mooy (2)	Australia	Midfielder	
2016–17	Neil Kilkenny	Australia	Midfielder	
2017–18	Bart Schenkeveld	Netherlands	Defender	
2018–19	Eugene Galekovic	Australia	Goalkeeper	
2019–20	Jamie Maclaren	Australia	Forward	
2020–21	Curtis Good	Australia	Defender	
2021–22	Florin Berenguer	France	Midfielder	
2022–23	**Mathew Leckie**	Australia	Forward	
2023–24	Tolgay Arslan	Germany	Midfielder	
2024–25	Kai Trewin	Australia	Defender	
2025–26	**Aziz Behich**	Australia	Defender	

=== Multiple wins ===
Players with multiple wins
Rank	Winner	Total wins	Years won
1	Clint Bolton (AUS)	2	2011, 2012
1	Aaron Mooy (AUS)	2	2015, 2016

=== Wins by nationality ===
Wins by nationality
Nationality	Wins
Australia	13
France	1
Germany	1
Netherlands	1
Uruguay	1

=== Wins by playing position ===
Wins by playing position
Position	Wins
Goalkeeper	3
Defender	4
Midfielder	5
Forward	5

== Women's award recipients ==
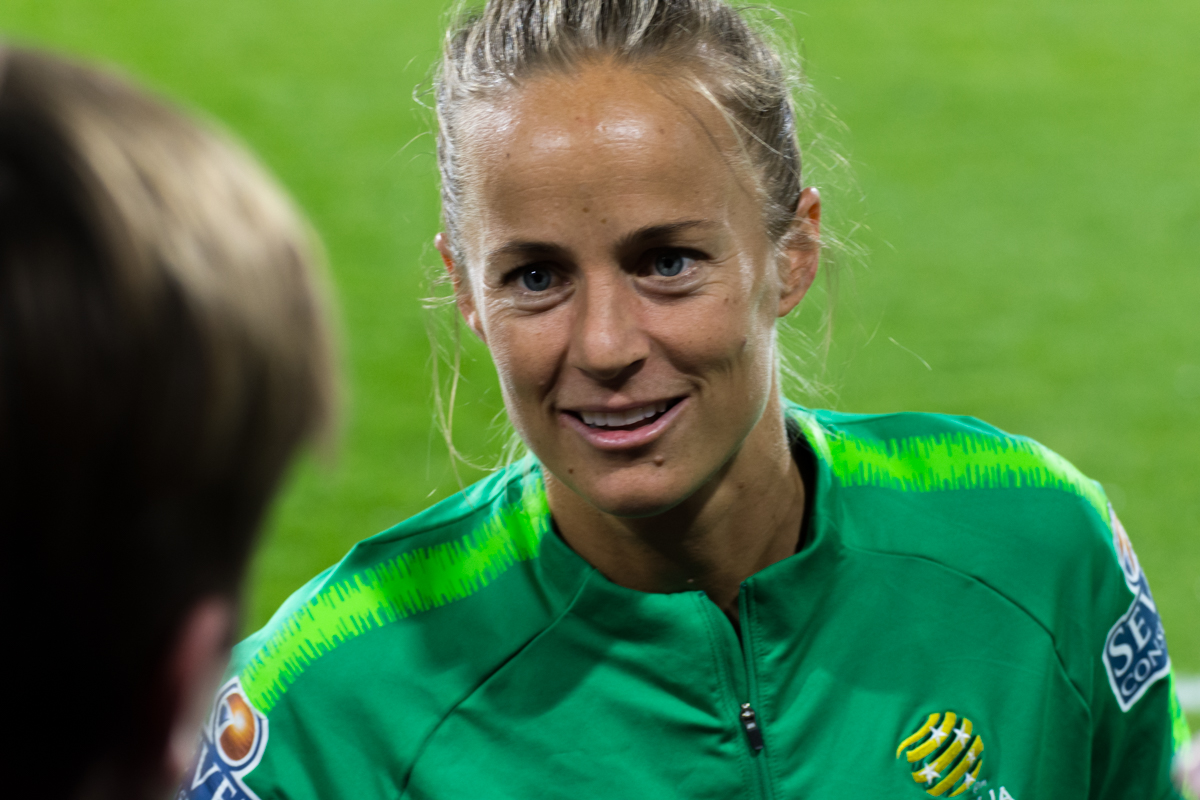
Aivi Luik was the first recipient of the award.

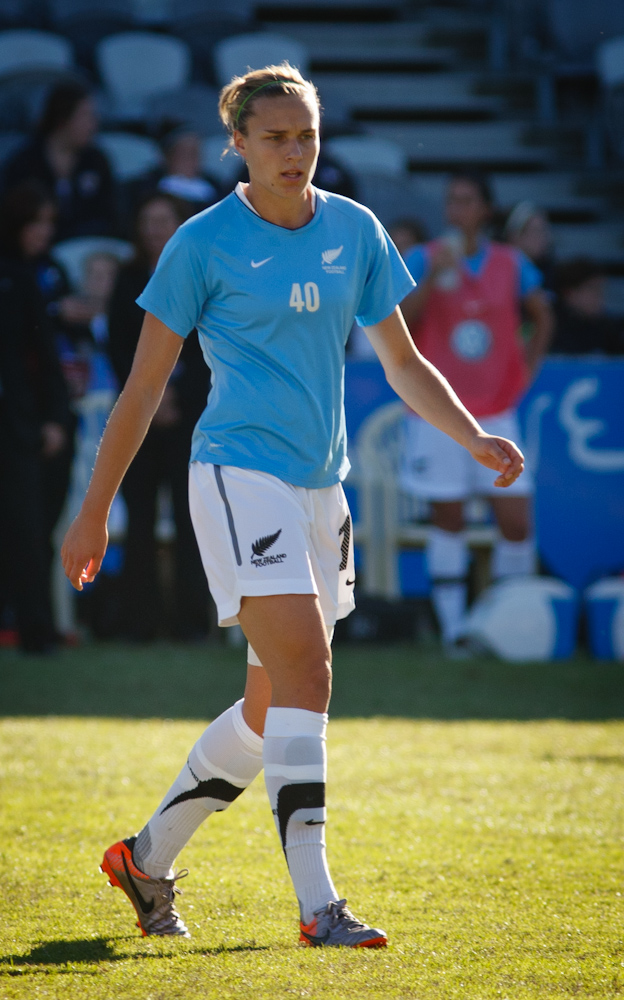
Hannah Wilkinson won the award in 2022, as the club's top scorer in the season.

Players in bold are still playing for Melbourne City

Women's award recipients
Season	Player	Nationality	Position	Ref.
2015–16	Aivi Luik	Australia	Midfielder	
2016–17	Steph Catley	Australia	Defender	
2017–18	Lauren Barnes	United States	Defender	
2018–19	Yukari Kinga	Japan	Defender	
2019–20	Ellie Carpenter	Australia	Defender	
2020–21	Teagan Micah	Australia	Goalkeeper	
2021–22	Holly McNamara	Australia	Forward	
2021–22	Hannah Wilkinson	New Zealand	Forward	
2022–23	Julia Grosso	United States	Defender	
2023–24	Laura Hughes	Australia	Midfielder	
2024–25	Taylor Otto	United States	Defender	
2025–26	**Rebekah Stott**	New Zealand	Defender	

=== Wins by nationality ===
Wins by nationality
Nationality	Wins
Australia	6
United States	3
New Zealand	2
Japan	1

=== Wins by playing position ===
Wins by playing position
Position	Wins
Goalkeeper	1
Defender	7
Midfielder	2
Forward	2

== See also ==
- List of Melbourne City FC players
- List of Melbourne City FC (women) players
