= 2023–24 Melbourne City FC (women) season =

9th season in existence of Melbourne City FC (women)

Melbourne City (A-League Women)
2023–24 season
- Owner: City Football Group
- Chairman: Khaldoon Al Mubarak
- Manager: Dario Vidošić
- Stadium: AAMI Park; City Football Academy
- A-League Women: 1st
- A-League Women Finals: Runners-up
- Top goalscorer: League: Hannah Wilkinson (9); All: Hannah Wilkinson (10)
- Highest home attendance: 7,671 vs. Sydney FC (4 May 2024); A-League Women Grand Final
- Lowest home attendance: 263 vs. Adelaide United (18 February 2024); A-League Women
- Average home league attendance: 1,615
- Biggest win: 5–0 vs. Adelaide United (A) (6 January 2024); A-League Women
- Biggest defeat: 1–3 (3 times); 0–2 (once)
Home colours	Away colours	Third colours

The 2023–24 season was the ninth in the history of Melbourne City FC (women). They were managed by Dario Vidošić.

All stand-alone home matches were played at Melbourne City's new City Football Academy in Cranbourne East.

== Review ==
=== Background ===
The 2022–23 season saw a perfect start in three matches into the top of the table towards Round 8; the last time they would finish a round in 1st place. Fellow undefeated matches kept City in second place during the time, until further losses to toppers Sydney FC and Western United brought City down to third place, and winning only one of their last five regular season matches to finish 3rd and lose the elimination-final to Melbourne Victory 4–1 on penalties after a 3–3 draw.

=== Pre-season ===
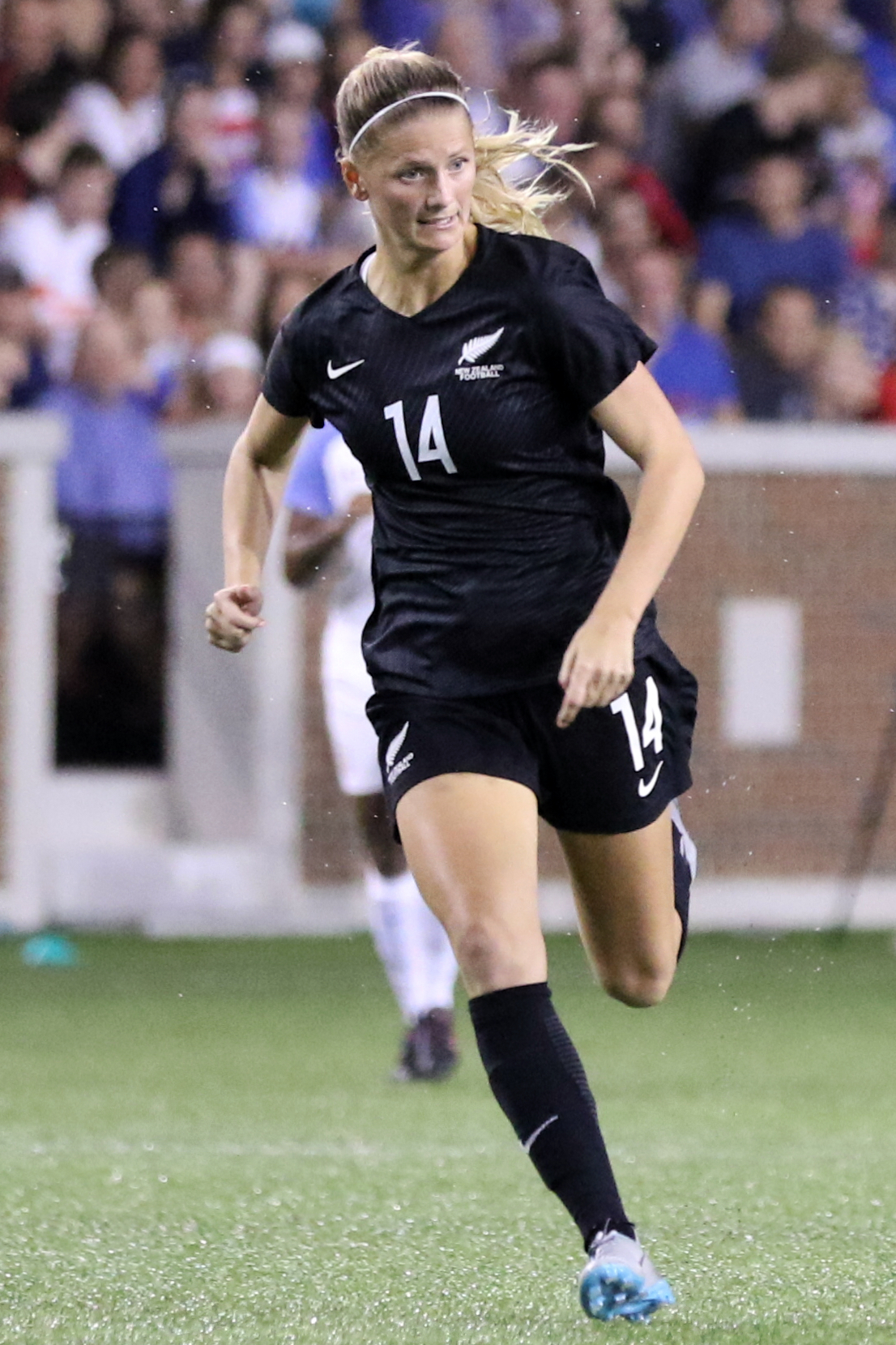
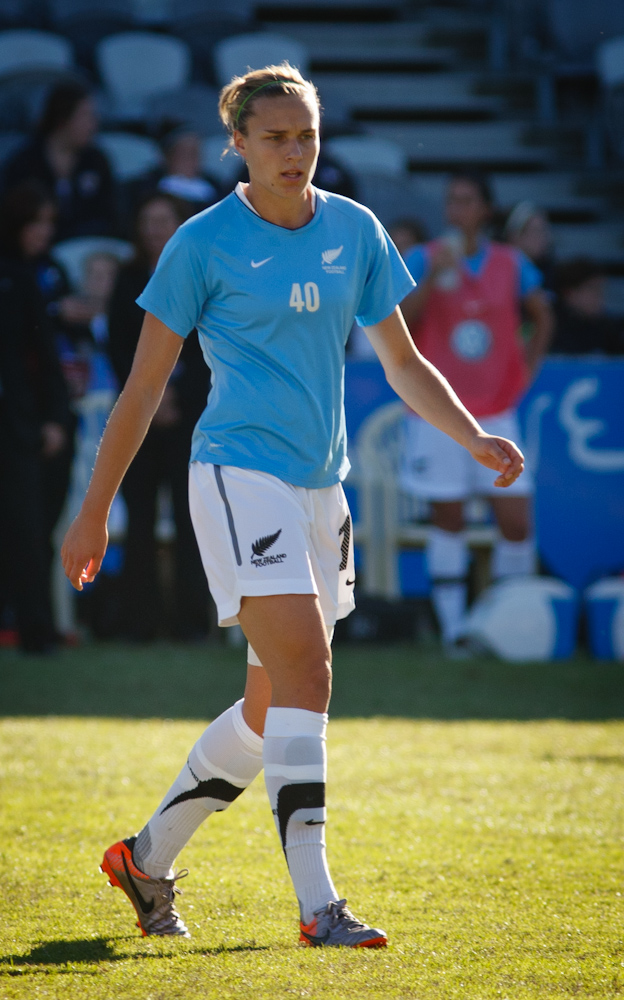
New Zealanders Katie Bowen and Hannah Wilkinson were called up to the 2023 FIFA Women's World Cup

Katie Bowen and Hannah Wilkinson were both called up to New Zealand's squad for the 2023 FIFA Women's World Cup on 3 July 2023. Rebekah Stott as City's first signing of the season, returned on a two-year deal from English club Brighton & Hove Albion for an undisclosed fee on 11 August 2023. Emma Checker departed the club on 21 August 2023, later joining arch-rivals Melbourne Victory. On 23 August 2023, Rhianna Pollicina, Holly McNamara and Leah Davidson all re-signed for City on two-year deals. The day after, Chelsea Blissett departed City after agreeing on a mutual contract termination. Midfidler Laura Hughes signed for City from Canberra United for the season on 25 August 2023. Canadian goalkeeper Lysianne Proulx joined City the day after on a two-year deal. On 29 August 2023, McKenna sisters Leticia re-signed for two further seasons and Tijan joining City from the Perth Glory. Further re-signings of Naomi Chinnama and Daniela Galic for the 2023–24 season occurred the day after.

On 8 September 2023, Hannah Wilkinson coming off the 2023 FIFA Women's World Cup with New Zealand, re-signed for her third season with City. On 11 September 2023, Proulx was called up to Canada's squad for the 2024 Summer Olympics qualification and Wilkinson and Stott being called up to New Zealand's friendly against Chile. American defender Taylor Otto signed for the season from Gotham FC on 19 September 2023. 43-year-old goalkeeper Melissa Barbieri re-signed on 27 September 2023 to play her seventh season for City. On 3 October 2023, Isabella Accardo re-signed for one season and Sophia Varley for two seasons; that day also playing a friendly against Melbourne Victory resulting in a 3–0 win at The Home of the Matildas thanks to goals by Hansen, Wilkinson and Pollicina. City's final pre-season signing on 14 October 2023 had Karly Roestbakken return to City for the 2023–24 season.

=== October ===

Starting line-up for the A-League Women match against Wellington Phoenix on 15 November

Their first match of the 2023–24 A-League Women campaign against the Wellington Phoenix resulted in a 1–0 win for City, with the winning goal by Hannah Wilkinson in the second half. On 18 October 2023, the Unite Round was introduced, a round where all matches were played in Sydney, where City's fixture against the Western Sydney Wanderers was moved to CommBank Stadium.

Proulx was again called up for Canada on 19 October 2023 for their two friendlies against Brazil. Roestbakken and Davidson were both out due to injuries, while Sophia and Leia Varley, Meyers and Accardo were all promoted for City's squad to face Canberra United in their home return match. The day after, four players were called up to the Young Matildas' squad for the 2024 AFC U-20 Women's Asian Cup those being Tijan McKenna, Galic, Chinnama and Karic. The home return match against Canberra, resulted in a 2–1 win for City going back-to-back wins to start the campaign thanks to a Pollicina brace.

=== November ===
After the international break, City promoted three players; Leia Varley, Meyers and Accardo, with Roestbakken and Davidson returning from injuries, but Henry out due to knee injury for their squad against Western United. It resulted in a 2–2 draw at City Vista Recreation Reserve, despite City coming from behind and the match being drawn for their first draw of the season, and moving back up to second place. Emina Ekic returned to the club and signed a two-year deal on 10 November. City went back to winning ways, defeating the Western Sydney Wanderers 4–3 at home, the opening goal via a penalty by Pollicina and a hat-trick for McNamara. On 17 November, McNamara was named in the PFA Player of the Month for October. The day after, McNamara got called up to the Matildas squad for their two friendlies against Canada in December 2023

City won 3–2 against the Newcastle Jets after scoring the opening goal through Galic, then conceding two goals in the first half and where a McNamara brace won the match for City in the last 10 minutes ultimately keeping second place spot, only one goal difference lower than toppers Perth Glory. On 21 November, it was confirmed that Holly McNamara suffered an ACL injury in her right knee for the remainder of the season. Another away trip; against Sydney FC resulted in a 3–2 win for City heading into the international break top of the table. Stott for New Zealand, Proulx for Canada for and Ekic for Bosnia and Herzegovina were each called up to their national team squads for the international window on 27 November. City's home fixture against the Perth Glory 9 December; originally set to be played at the City Football Academy field, was relocated to B.T. Connor Reserve, due to ongoing constructions.

=== December ===
Roestbakken returned from injury in return to the squad against Perth Glory, and would be without Grosso due to injury. It resulted in a 3–1 loss at home for City; their first loss of the season, losing top spot to Perth regaining top of the table. On 11 December, Daniela Galic was nominated as the A-League Women Young Footballer of the Year for November. Grosso returned to the squad to face the Central Coast Mariners away. The match being City's first against the Central Coast, resulted in a 1–1 draw. Returning home, City won 1–0 against the Melbourne Victory via Ekic's first half goal to regain first place. Only five days on, City extends their lead at the top of the table, with a 5–3 win over the Brisbane Roar with Ekic claiming a hat-trick.

=== January ===
On 6 January; away to Adelaide at the Marden Sports Complex resulted in a 5–0 win for City with Galic scoring a first half hat-trick, as well as goals by Torpey and Wilkinson.

== Players ==
=== First-team squad ===
Note: Flags indicate national team as defined under FIFA eligibility rules; some limited exceptions apply. Players may hold more than one non-FIFA nationality.

No.	Pos.	Nation	Player
1	GK	AUS	Sophia Varley
2	DF	AUS	Leia Varley (scholarship)
3	DF	AUS	Naomi Chinnama
5	DF	USA	Taylor Otto
6	MF	AUS	Leticia McKenna
7	MF	USA	Julia Grosso
9	FW	AUS	Holly McNamara
10	MF	AUS	Rhianna Pollicina
11	FW	BIH	Emina Ekic
12	MF	AUS	Shelby McMahon (injury replacement)
13	DF	NZL	Rebekah Stott (captain)
14	MF	AUS	Laura Hughes

No.	Pos.	Nation	Player
15	MF	AUS	Kiera Meyers (scholarship)
16	DF	AUS	Karly Roestbakken
17	FW	NZL	Hannah Wilkinson
18	DF	AUS	Leah Davidson
19	MF	AUS	Tijan McKenna
20	FW	AUS	Caitlin Karic
21	MF	AUS	Isabella Accardo
22	FW	AUS	Bryleeh Henry
23	GK	AUS	Melissa Barbieri
24	MF	AUS	Daniela Galic
30	GK	AUS	Emily Shields
88	GK	BRA	Bárbara

== Transfers ==
=== Transfers in ===
No.	Position	Player	Transferred from	Type/fee	Contract length	Date	Ref.
13	FW	Rebekah Stott	(England) Brighton & Hove Albion	Undisclosed fee	2 years	11 August 2023	
14	MF	Laura Hughes	Canberra United	Free transfer	1 year	25 August 2023	
44	GK	(Canada) Lysianne Proulx	(Portugal) Torreense	Free transfer	2 years	26 August 2023	
19	MF	Tijan McKenna	Perth Glory	Free transfer	1 year	29 August 2023	
5	DF	(United States) Taylor Otto	(United States) Gotham FC	Free transfer	1 year	19 September 2023	
15	MF	Kiera Meyers	Unattached	Free transfer	2 years scholarship	12 October 2023	
2	DF	Leia Varley	Unattached	Free transfer	1 year scholarship	12 October 2023	
11	FW	(Bosnia and Herzegovina) Emina Ekic	(United States) Racing Louisville	Free transfer	2 years	10 November 2023	
12	MF	Shelby McMahon	(Australia) Gold Coast Knights	Injury replacement	5 months	24 January 2024	
88	GK	(Brazil) Bárbara	Unattached	Free transfer	4 months	28 February 2024	
30	GK	Emily Shields	(Australia) Bulleen Lions	Injury replacement loan	1 match	4 May 2024	

=== Transfers out ===
No.	Position	Player	Transferred to	Type/fee	Date	Ref.
15	DF	Emma Checker	Melbourne Victory	End of contract	21 August 2023	
4	DF	Chelsea Blissett	Brisbane Roar	End of contract	24 August 2023	
5	DF	Tori Tumeth	Sydney FC	Free transfer	25 August 2023	
19	FW	(Chile) María José Rojas	Canberra United	Free transfer	4 September 2023	
14	MF	(New Zealand) Katie Bowen	(Italy) Inter Milan	End of contract	8 September 2023	
25	MF	Darcey Malone	Sydney FC	Free transfer	13 October 2023	
8	DF	Kaitlyn Torpey	(United States) San Diego Wave	Undisclosed	6 February 2024	
44	GK	(Canada) Lysianne Proulx	(United States) Bay FC	Undisclosed	9 February 2024	

=== Contract extensions ===
No.	Position	Player	Duration	Date	Ref.
18	Leah Davidson	Defender	2 years	23 August 2023	
9	Holly McNamara	Forward	2 years	23 August 2023	
10	Rhianna Pollicina	Midfielder	2 years	23 August 2023	
7	(United States) Julia Grosso	Midfielder	2 years	24 August 2023	
6	Leticia McKenna	Midfielder	2 years	29 August 2023	
3	Naomi Chinnama	Defender	1 year	30 August 2023	
24	Daniela Galic	Midfielder	1 year	30 August 2023	
17	(New Zealand) Hannah Wilkinson	Forward	1 year	8 September 2023	
23	Melissa Barbieri	Goalkeeper	1 year	27 September 2023	
1	Sophia Varley	Goalkeeper	2 years	3 October 2023	
21	Isabella Accardo	Midfielder	1 year	3 October 2023	
16	Karly Roestbakken	Defender	1 year	14 October 2023	

== Pre-season and friendlies ==
1 October 2023	Melbourne Victory (Australia)	0–3	(Australia) Melbourne City	Melbourne
11:30 AEDT		Report	Hansen 35' (o.g.); Wilkinson 54'; Pollicina 79'	Stadium: The Home of the Matildas

== Competitions ==
=== Overall record ===
Competition	First match	Last match	Starting round	Final position	Record							
Competition	First match	Last match	Starting round	Final position	Pld	W	D	L	GF	GA	GD	Win %
A-League Women	15 October 2023	31 March 2024	Matchday 1	1st	22	12	5	5	40	29	+11	54.55
A-League Women Finals	21 April 2024	4 May 2024	Semi-finals	Runners-up	3	2	0	1	6	1	+5	66.67
Total					25	14	5	6	46	30	+16	56.00

Source: Soccerway

=== A-League Women ===
==== League table ====
Pos	Team	Pld	W	D	L	GF	GA	GD	Pts	Qualification
1	Melbourne City	22	12	5	5	40	29	+11	41	Qualification to Finals series and 2024–25 AFC Women's Champions League
2	Sydney FC (C)	22	11	6	5	31	20	+11	39	Qualification to Finals series
3	Western United	22	11	3	8	37	34	+3	36	Qualification to Finals series
4	Melbourne Victory	22	10	6	6	44	29	+15	36	Qualification to Finals series
5	Central Coast Mariners	22	10	5	7	31	24	+7	35	Qualification to Finals series

Source: A-Leagues
Rules for classification: 1) points; 2) wins; 3) goal difference; 4) goals scored; 5) head-to-head results; 6) Fair Play points; 7) away head-to-head results; 8) home head-to-head results; 9) toss of a coin
(C) Champions

==== Results summary ====
Overall								Home						Away					
Pld	W	D	L	GF	GA	GD	Pts	W	D	L	GF	GA	GD	W	D	L	GF	GA	GD
21	12	5	4	40	28	+12	41	7	2	2	22	15	+7	5	3	2	18	13	+5

Source: KEEPUP

==== Results by round ====
Round	1	2	3	4	5	6	7	8	9	10	11	12	13	14	15	16	17	18	19	20	21	22
Ground	A	H	A	H	A	A	H	A	H	H	A	N	H	H	A	H	H	A	H	A	H	A
Result	W	W	D	W	W	W	L	D	W	W	W	L	W	L	L	D	D	L	W	D	W	W
Position	4	2	2	2	2	1	2	2	1	1	1	1	1	1	1	1	2	2	2	3	2	1
Points	3	6	7	10	13	16	16	17	20	23	26	26	29	29	29	30	31	31	34	35	38	41

Source: KEEPUP
A = Away; H = Home; N = Neutral; W = Win; D = Draw; L = Loss

==== Matches ====
Win Draw Loss

15 October 2023 1	Wellington Phoenix	0–1	Melbourne City	Wellington
15:00 NZDT		Report	Wilkinson 73'	Stadium: Sky Stadium; Attendance: 2,505; Referee: Beth Rattray

21 October 2023 2	Melbourne City	2–1	Canberra United	Melbourne
14:45 AEDT	Pollicina 26', 47' (pen.)	Report	Heyman 63'	Stadium: AAMI Park; Attendance: 2,138; Referee: Anna-Marie Keighley

5 November 2023 3	Western United	2–2	Melbourne City	Melbourne
16:00 AEDT	Keane 6'; Johnson 86'	Report	McNamara 49'; Wilkinson 75'	Stadium: City Vista Recreation Reserve; Attendance: 1,723; Referee: Bec Mackie

12 November 2023 4	Melbourne City	4–3	Western Sydney Wanderers	Melbourne
17:45 AEDT	Pollicina 26' (pen.); McNamara 32', 58', 64'	Report	Harding 43', 74'; Bruce 69'	Stadium: AAMI Park; Attendance: 2,010; Referee: Isabella Libri

19 November 2023 5	Newcastle Jets	2–3	Melbourne City	Newcastle
16:00 AEDT	van Egmond 14'; Gooch 32'	Report	Galic 8'; McNamara 78', 90+2'	Stadium: Newcastle Number 2 Sports Ground; Attendance: 3,207; Referee: Asaka Koizumi

26 November 2023 6	Sydney FC	2–3	Melbourne City	Sydney
16:00 AEDT	Thompson 76'; Mclean 79'	Report	Grosso 23'; Ekic 31'; Galic 45+3'	Stadium: Sydney Olympic Park Athletic Centre; Attendance: 3,937; Referee: Georgia Ghirardello
Note: Match delayed for 30 minutes after the 75th minute due to lightning. It was restarted at the 76th minute.

9 December 2023 7	Melbourne City	1–3	Perth Glory	Melbourne
16:00 AEDT	Wilkinson 17'	Report	Farrow 32', 51', 71'	Stadium: B.T. Connor Reserve; Attendance: 432; Referee: Kate Jacewicz
Note: Match originally set to play at City Football Academy, but changed due to ongoing constructions at the venue. It was relocated to B.T. Connor Reserve.

15 December 2023 8	Central Coast Mariners	1–1	Melbourne City	Gosford
19:30 AEDT	Badawiya 53'	Report	Stott 78'	Stadium: Industree Group Stadium; Attendance: 1,273; Referee: Caitlin Williams
Note: Match originally scheduled for 19:00 AEDT. It was rescheduled to 19:30 AEDT due to power outages.

23 December 2023 9	Melbourne City	1–0	Melbourne Victory	Melbourne
17:00 AEDT	Ekic 10'	Report		Stadium: AAMI Park; Attendance: 6,286; Referee: Kate Jacewicz

28 December 2023 10	Melbourne City	5–3	Brisbane Roar	Melbourne
17:00 AEDT	Ekic 20', 22', 52'; Wilkinson 35'; Pollicina 75' (pen.)	Report	Corbin 4', 72'; McCormick 47'	Stadium: AAMI Park; Attendance: 2,314; Referee: Rebecca Durcau

6 January 2024 11	Adelaide United	0–5	Melbourne City	Adelaide
18:30 ACDT		Report	Galic 15', 27', 34'; Torpey 30'; Wilkinson 83'	Stadium: Marden Sports Complex; Attendance: 883; Referee: Isabella Libri

14 January 2024 12	Western Sydney Wanderers	1–0	Melbourne City	Sydney
17:00 AEDT	Caspers 67'	Report		Stadium: CommBank Stadium; Attendance: 1,515; Referee: Isabella Blaess

20 January 2024 13	Melbourne City	2–1	Wellington Phoenix	Melbourne
17:00 AEDT	Pollicina 51'; Ekic 74'	Report	Speckmaier 78'	Stadium: City Football Academy; Attendance: 1,124; Referee: Isabella Libri

25 January 2024 14	Melbourne City	1–3	Western United	Melbourne
17:00 AEDT	Wilkinson 32'	Report	Keane 28', 53'; Johnson 79'	Stadium: AAMI Park; Attendance: 1,656; Referee: Rebecca Durcau
Note: Match originally scheduled for 28 January at City Football Academy.

4 February 2024 15	Canberra United	3–1	Melbourne City	Canberra
17:00 AEDT	Heyman 37'; Stanic-Floody 39'; Flannery 74'	Report	Otto 90+1'	Stadium: McKellar Park; Attendance: 2,189; Referee: Bec Mackie

10 February 2024 16	Melbourne City	0–0	Sydney FC	Melbourne
17:30 AEDT		Report		Stadium: City Football Academy; Attendance: 709; Referee: Casey Reibelt

18 February 2024 17	Melbourne City	1–1	Adelaide United	Melbourne
17:00 AEDT	Galic 67'	Report	T. McKenna 70' (o.g.)	Stadium: City Football Academy; Attendance: 263; Referee: Rebecca Durcau

2 March 2024 18	Brisbane Roar	2–0	Melbourne City	Brisbane
17:00 AEST	Yallop 59'; Freier 61'	Report		Stadium: Perry Park; Attendance: 2,158; Referee: Bec Mackie

10 March 2024 19	Melbourne City	2–0	Newcastle Jets	Melbourne
18:00 AEDT	Wilkinson 50', 56'	Report		Stadium: City Football Academy; Attendance: 375; Referee: Caitlin Williams
Note: Match originally scheduled for 17:00 AEST, but delayed due to extreme heat forecast. It was rescheduled for 17:30 AEDT, then 18:00 AEDT.

17 March 2024 20	Melbourne Victory	0–0	Melbourne City	Melbourne
14:00 AEDT		Report		Stadium: The Home of the Matildas; Attendance: 2,012; Referee: Casey Reibelt

23 March 2024 21	Melbourne City	3–0	Central Coast Mariners	Melbourne
16:00 AEDT	Wilkinson 24'; Ekic 28' (pen.); Otto 87'	Report		Stadium: City Football Academy; Attendance: 456; Referee: Kate Jacewicz

31 March 2024 22	Perth Glory	1–2	Melbourne City	Perth
16:30 AWST	Lala 90+4'	Report	Pollicina 8'; McMahon 89'	Stadium: Macedonia Park; Attendance: 1,314; Referee: Isabella Mossin

==== Finals series ====
21 April 2024 Semi-finals 1st Leg	Newcastle Jets	0–3	Melbourne City	Maitland
15:00 AEST		Report	Galic 5'; Ekic 61'; McMahon 77'	Stadium: Maitland Sportsground; Attendance: 6,836; Referee: Bec Mackie

28 April 2024 Semi-finals 2nd Leg	Melbourne City	3–0 (6–0 agg.)	Newcastle Jets	Melbourne
13:00 AEST	Pollicina 26'; Wilkinson 67'; McKenna 70'	Report		Stadium: AAMI Park; Attendance: 2,041; Referee: Rebecca Durcau

4 May 2024 Grand final	Melbourne City	0–1	Sydney FC	Melbourne
16:15 AEST		Report	Connors 69'	Stadium: AAMI Park; Attendance: 7,671; Referee: Casey Reibelt

== Statistics ==
=== Appearances and goals ===
Includes all competitions. Players with no appearances not included in the list.

No.	Pos.	Nat.	Name	A-League Women				Total	
No.	Pos.	Nat.	Name	Regular season		Finals series		Total	
No.	Pos.	Nat.	Name	Apps	Goals	Apps	Goals	Apps	Goals
2	DF	(Australia)	Leia Varley	3+2	0	0	0	5	0
3	DF	(Australia)	Naomi Thomas-Chinnama	9+5	0	0+1	0	15	0
5	DF	(United States)	Taylor Otto	22	2	3	0	25	2
6	MF	(Australia)	Leticia McKenna	16+5	0	1+2	1	24	1
7	DF	(United States)	Julia Grosso	11+4	1	2+1	0	18	1
9	FW	(Australia)	Holly McNamara	5	6	0	0	5	6
10	FW	(Australia)	Rhianna Pollicina	20+1	6	3	0	24	6
11	FW	(Bosnia and Herzegovina)	Emina Ekic	15+3	7	3	1	21	8
12	MF	(Australia)	Shelby McMahon	2+3	1	0+2	1	7	2
13	DF	(New Zealand)	Rebekah Stott	19	1	3	0	22	1
14	MF	(Australia)	Laura Hughes	21+1	0	3	0	25	0
15	FW	(Australia)	Kiera Meyers	2+6	0	0	0	8	0
16	DF	(Australia)	Karly Roestbakken	11+4	0	1	0	16	0
17	FW	(New Zealand)	Hannah Wilkinson	19+1	9	2+1	1	23	10
18	MF	(Australia)	Leah Davidson	6+8	0	3	0	17	0
19	FW	(Australia)	Tijan McKenna	3+9	0	0	0	12	0
20	FW	(Australia)	Caitlin Karic	0+3	0	0+3	0	6	0
21	DF	(Australia)	Isabella Accardo	0+2	0	0	0	2	0
22	FW	(Australia)	Bryleeh Henry	8+8	0	3	0	19	0
23	GK	(Australia)	Melissa Barbieri	3	0	1+1	0	5	0
24	MF	(Australia)	Daniela Galic	16+3	6	3	1	22	7
88	GK	(Brazil)	Bárbara	5	0	2	0	7	0
Player(s) transferred out but featured this season
8	MF	(Australia)	Kaitlyn Torpey	12+1	1	0	0	13	1
44	GK	(Canada)	Lysianne Proulx	14	0	0	0	14	0

=== Disciplinary record ===
Includes all competitions. The list is sorted by squad number when total cards are equal. Players with no cards not included in the list.

Rank	No.	Pos.	Nat.	Name	A-League Women						Total		
Rank	No.	Pos.	Nat.	Name	Regular season			Finals series			Total		
Rank	No.	Pos.	Nat.	Name	Yellow card	(yellow card) (yellow-red card)	Red card	Yellow card	(yellow card) (yellow-red card)	Red card	Yellow card	(yellow card) (yellow-red card)	Red card
1	11	FW	(Bosnia and Herzegovina)	Emina Ekic	2	1	0	0	0	0	2	1	0
2	14	MF	(Australia)	Laura Hughes	5	0	0	1	0	0	6	0	0
3	10	FW	(Australia)	Rhianna Pollicina	3	0	0	0	0	0	3	0	0
4	7	DF	(United States)	Julia Grosso	1	0	0	1	0	0	2	0	0
5	5	DF	(United States)	Taylor Otto	1	0	0	0	0	0	1	0	0
5	6	MF	(Australia)	Leticia McKenna	1	0	0	0	0	0	1	0	0
5	16	DF	(Australia)	Karly Roestbakken	1	0	0	0	0	0	1	0	0
5	19	FW	(Australia)	Tijan McKenna	1	0	0	0	0	0	1	0	0
5	20	FW	(Australia)	Caitlin Karic	0	0	0	1	0	0	1	0	0
Total					14	1	0	2	0	0	16	1	0

=== Clean sheets ===
Includes all competitions. The list is sorted by squad number when total clean sheets are equal. Numbers in parentheses represent games where both goalkeepers participated and both kept a clean sheet; the number in parentheses is awarded to the goalkeeper who was substituted on, whilst a full clean sheet is awarded to the goalkeeper who was on the field at the start of play. Goalkeepers with no clean sheets not included in the list.

Rank	No.	Nat.	Goalkeeper	A-League Women		Total
Rank	No.	Nat.	Goalkeeper	Regular season	Finals series	Total
1	88	(Brazil)	Bárbara	3	2	5
2	44	(Canada)	Lysianne Proulx	3	0	3
3	23	(Australia)	Melissa Barbieri	1	0 (1)	1 (1)
Total				7	2 (1)	9 (1)

== See also ==
- 2023–24 Melbourne City FC season
