= 2022–23 Melbourne City FC (women) season =

8th season in existence of Melbourne City FC (women)

Melbourne City (A-League Women)
2022–23 season
- Owner: City Football Group
- Chairman: Khaldoon Al Mubarak
- Manager: Rado Vidošić (to 24 November 2022); Dario Vidošić (from 24 November 2022)
- Stadium: Casey Fields; AAMI Park; Kingston Heath Soccer Complex
- A-League Women: 3rd
- Top goalscorer: League: Rhianna Pollicina (8); All: Rhianna Pollicina (10)
- Highest home attendance: 5,392 vs. Western United (17 December 2022); A-League Women
- Lowest home attendance: 247 vs. Western Sydney Wanderers (21 January 2023); A-League Women
- Average home league attendance: 1,553
- Biggest win: 4–0 (twice); 5–1 (once)
- Biggest defeat: 0–3 vs. Sydney FC (A) (4 February 2023); A-League Women
Home colours	Away colours	Third colours

The 2022–23 season was the eighth in the history of Melbourne City FC (women). They were managed by Rado Vidošić until late November 2022, and then by Dario Vidošić for the rest of the season.

== Players ==
=== First-team squad ===
As of 1 February 2023

Note: Flags indicate national team as defined under FIFA eligibility rules; some limited exceptions apply. Players may hold more than one non-FIFA nationality.

No.	Pos.	Nation	Player
1	GK	AUS	Sally James
3	DF	AUS	Naomi Thomas-Chinnama
4	DF	AUS	Chelsea Blissett
5	DF	AUS	Tori Tumeth
6	MF	AUS	Leticia McKenna
7	MF	USA	Julia Grosso
8	DF	AUS	Kaitlyn Torpey
9	FW	AUS	Holly McNamara
10	MF	AUS	Rhianna Pollicina
14	MF	NZL	Katie Bowen
15	DF	AUS	Emma Checker (captain)

No.	Pos.	Nation	Player
16	DF	AUS	Karly Roestbakken
17	FW	NZL	Hannah Wilkinson
18	DF	AUS	Leah Davidson
19	FW	CHI	María José Rojas
20	FW	AUS	Caitlin Karic
21	MF	AUS	Isabella Accardo (scholarship)
22	FW	AUS	Bryleeh Henry
23	GK	AUS	Melissa Barbieri
24	MF	AUS	Daniela Galic
25	MF	AUS	Darcey Malone

== Transfers ==
=== Transfers in ===
No.	Position	Player	Transferred from	Type/fee	Contract length	Date	Ref.
22	FW	Bryleeh Henry	Western Sydney Wanderers	Free transfer	2 years	22 September 2022	
16	DF	Karly Roestbakken	(Norway) LSK Kvinner	Free transfer	1 year	4 October 2022	
7	DF	(United States) Julia Grosso	(United States) Kentucky Wildcats	Free transfer	1 year	18 October 2022	
24	MF	Daniela Galic	(Australia) FNSW Institute	Free transfer	1 year	19 October 2022	
15	DF	Emma Checker	(Sweden) Umeå	Loan return		3 November 2022	
14	DF	(New Zealand) Katie Bowen	(United States) North Carolina Courage	Free transfer		4 November 2022	
13	FW	(Bosnia and Herzegovina) Emina Ekic	(United States) Racing Louisville	Loan	4 months	4 November 2022	
19	FW	(Chile) María José Rojas	Sydney FC	Injury replacement	1 month	17 November 2022	
30	GK	Charlotte Hrehoresin	(Australia) FV Emerging	Injury replacement		15 January 2023	
—	FW	Kiera Meyers	Unattached	Injury replacement	1 match	10 February 2023	
19	FW	(Chile) María José Rojas	Unattached	Free transfer		10 February 2023	

=== Transfers out ===
No.	Position	Player	Transferred to	Type/fee	Date	Ref.
7	DF	Winonah Heatley	(Denmark) Nordsjælland	Free transfer	23 June 2022	
12	GK	Coco Majstorovic	Unattached	Free transfer	30 June 2022	
13	DF	(New Zealand) Rebekah Stott	(England) Brighton & Hove Albion	Free transfer	21 July 2022	
15	DF	Emma Checker	(Sweden) Umeå	Loan	3 August 2022	
2	DF	(New Zealand) Marisa van der Meer	Wellington Phoenix	Free transfer	7 September 2022	
19	DF	(Serbia) Tyla-Jay Vlajnic	Western United	Free transfer	16 September 2022	
16	MF	Meisha Westland	Adelaide United	Free transfer	16 September 2022	
19	FW	(Chile) María José Rojas	Unattached	Injury replacement end	26 December 2022	
13	FW	(Bosnia and Herzegovina) Emina Ekic	(United States) Racing Louisville	Loan return	4 January 2023	
30	GK	Charlotte Hrehoresin	(Australia) FV Emerging	Injury replacement end	26 January 2023	
—	FW	Kiera Meyers	Unattached	Injury replacement end	2 March 2023	

=== Contract extensions ===
No.	Position	Player	Duration	Date	Ref.
8	MF	Kaitlyn Torpey	2 years	15 September 2022	
10	FW	Rhianna Pollicina	1 year	22 September 2022	
23	GK	Melissa Barbieri	1 year	27 September 2022	
17	FW	Hannah Wilkinson	1 year	30 September 2022	
1	GK	Sally James	1 year	6 October 2022	
20	FW	Caitlin Karic	1 year	6 October 2022	

== Pre-season and friendlies ==
1 November 2022	Melbourne City (Australia)	2–3	(Australia) Melbourne Victory	Melbourne
	Pollicina (?)	Report	(unknown) (?)	Stadium: Casey Fields
Note: Match was divided into three parts

10 November 2022	Melbourne City (Australia)	0–3	(Australia) Western United	Melbourne
		Report	Keane 33', 49'; McDonald 35'	Stadium: Casey Fields

18 February 2023	Melbourne City (Australia)	4–0	(Australia) Young Matildas	Melbourne
	McNamara (?); Henry (?); Davidson (?)	Report

== Competitions ==
=== Overall record ===
Competition	First match	Last match	Starting round	Final position	Record							
Competition	First match	Last match	Starting round	Final position	Pld	W	D	L	GF	GA	GD	Win %
A-League Women	20 November 2022	2 April 2023	Matchday 1	3rd	18	9	3	6	36	23	+13	50.00
A-League Women Finals	15 April 2023		Elimination Final	Elimination Final	1	0	1	0	3	3	+0	0.00
Total					19	9	4	6	39	26	+13	47.37

Source: Soccerway

=== A-League Women ===
==== Results summary ====
Overall								Home						Away					
Pld	W	D	L	GF	GA	GD	Pts	W	D	L	GF	GA	GD	W	D	L	GF	GA	GD
18	9	3	6	36	23	+13	30	5	3	1	17	9	+8	4	0	5	19	14	+5

Last updated: 2 April 2023.
Source: KEEPUP

==== Results by round ====
Round	1	2	3	4	5	6	7	8	9	10	10	11	12	13	14	15	16	17	18	19	20
Ground	A	B	H	H	H	A	H	B	A	A	H	H	H	A	A	B	A	H	H	A	H
Result	W	B	W	W	L	W	W	B	L	W	D	W	W	L	L	B	W	L	D	L	D
Position	1	4	2	1	3	1	1	1	3	2	2	2	2	2	2	3	3	3	3	3	3
Points	3	3	6	9	9	12	15	15	15	18	19	22	25	25	25	25	28	28	29	29	30

Updated to match(es) played on 2 April 2023. Source: KEEPUP
A = Away; H = Home; B = Bye; W = Win; D = Draw; L = Loss

==== League table ====
Pos	Team	Pld	W	D	L	GF	GA	GD	Pts	Qualification
1	Sydney FC (C)	18	13	1	4	43	15	+28	40	Qualification to Finals series and 2023 AFC Women's Club Championship
2	Western United (Note: The APL awarded Western United a 3–0 win as a result of Brisbane Roar fielding an ineligible player, after the round 17 match had originally finished 2–0 for Brisbane.)	18	13	0	5	38	20	+18	39	Qualification to Finals series
3	Melbourne City	18	9	3	6	36	23	+13	30	Qualification to Finals series
4	Melbourne Victory	18	7	8	3	29	22	+7	29	Qualification to Finals series
5	Canberra United	18	8	5	5	35	30	+5	29	

Source: A-Leagues
Rules for classification: 1) points; 2) goal difference; 3) number of goals scored.
(C) Champions

==== Matches ====
Win Draw Loss

20 November 2022 1	Wellington Phoenix	1–4	Melbourne City	Wellington
15:00 NZDT	Pritchard 82'	Report	Henry 48'; Rojas 50'; Pollicina 65' (pen.), 69'	Stadium: Sky Stadium; Attendance: 5,213; Referee: Anna-Marie Keighley

3 December 2022 3	Melbourne City	3–0	Brisbane Roar	Melbourne
15:00 AEDT	Henry 30'; Rojas 51'; Ekic 80'	Report		Stadium: Casey Fields; Attendance: 670; Referee: Isabella Blaess

10 December 2022 4	Melbourne City	5–1	Newcastle Jets	Melbourne
15:00 AEDT	Torpey 6'; Rojas 27'; Henry 29'; Karic 78'; Ekic 81' (pen.)	Report	Andrews 70'	Stadium: Casey Fields; Attendance: 347; Referee: Rebecca Durcau

17 December 2022 5	Melbourne City	1–3	Western United	Melbourne
17:05 AEDT	Ekic 28'	Report	Taranto 2'; Logarzo 64', 90+6' (pen.)	Stadium: AAMI Park; Attendance: 5,392; Referee: Kate Jacewicz

23 December 2022 6	Canberra United	0–4	Melbourne City	Queanbeyan
18:00 AEDT		Report	Pollicina 28', 55'; Rojas 69'; Galic 88'	Stadium: Seiffert Oval; Attendance: 1,009; Referee: Georgia Ghirardello

27 December 2022 7	Melbourne City	1–0	Perth Glory	Melbourne
20:15 AEDT	Ekic 60' (pen.)	Report		Stadium: AAMI Park; Attendance: 4,341; Referee: Bec Mackie

8 January 2023 9	Western Sydney Wanderers	2–0	Melbourne City	Sydney
16:00 AEDT	Gallagher 40'; Price 55'	Report		Stadium: Wanderers Football Park; Attendance: 466; Referee: Lara Lee

11 January 2023 10	Adelaide United	0–3	Melbourne City	Adelaide
18:30 ACDT		Report	Galic 47'; McKenna 90+2'; Karic 90+5'	Stadium: ServiceFM Stadium; Attendance: 803; Referee: Isabella Blaess

15 January 2023 10	Melbourne City	1–1	Melbourne Victory	Melbourne
17:00 AEDT	Wilkinson 37'	Report	Chidiac 13'	Stadium: Casey Fields; Attendance: 506; Referee: Georgia Ghirardello

21 January 2023 11	Melbourne City	1–0	Western Sydney Wanderers	Melbourne
15:00 AEDT	Wilkinson 14'	Report		Stadium: Casey Fields; Attendance: 247; Referee: Bec Mackie

29 January 2023 12	Melbourne City	1–0	Adelaide United	Melbourne
18:15 AEDT	Pollicina 54'	Report		Stadium: AAMI Park; Attendance: 595; Referee: Lara Lee

4 February 2023 13	Sydney FC	3–0	Melbourne City	Sydney
14:20 AEDT	Hunter 27'; Vine 47'; Haley 71'	Report		Stadium: Allianz Stadium; Attendance: 3,654; Referee: Rebecca Durcau

11 February 2023 14	Western United	2–1	Melbourne City	Melbourne
14:20 AEDT	Keane 48'; Cummings 86' (pen.)	Report	McKenna 40'	Stadium: AAMI Park; Attendance: 1,150; Referee: Anna-Marie Keighley

4 March 2023 16	Newcastle Jets	0–4	Melbourne City	Newcastle
15:00 AEDT		Report	Rojas 25'; Pollicina 82'; Henry 82'; Wilkinson 90+3'	Stadium: Newcastle Number 2 Sports Ground; Attendance: 940; Referee: Kelly Jones

13 March 2023 17	Melbourne Victory	2–0	Melbourne City	Melbourne
15:20 AEDT	Ayres 16' (pen.); Zois 20'	Report		Stadium: AAMI Park; Attendance: 1,655; Referee: Isabella Blaess

18 March 2023 18	Melbourne City	1–1	Sydney FC	Melbourne
13:00 AEDT	Torpey 90+4'	Report	Vine 24'	Stadium: Kingston Heath Soccer Complex; Attendance: 463; Referee: Anna-Marie Keighley

26 March 2023 19	Perth Glory	4–3	Melbourne City	Perth
15:00 AEDT	Lawrence 70'; Blake 71'; Lowry 81'; Hintzen 87'	Report	Pollicina 33'; Wilkinson 74'; Grosso 90+1'	Stadium: Macedonia Park; Attendance: 910; Referee: Kelly Jones

2 April 2023 20	Melbourne City	3–3	Canberra United	Melbourne
17:40 AEST	Wilkinson 12'; Pollicina 34'; McNamara 59'	Report	Jale 14'; Milivojević 80', 88'	Stadium: AAMI Park; Attendance: 1,416; Referee: Rachael Mitchenson

==== Finals series ====
15 April 2023 Elimination final	Melbourne City	3–3 (a.e.t.) (1–4 p)	Melbourne Victory	Melbourne
15:00 AEST	Pollicina 40', 79'; Wilkinson 90+7'	Report	Ayres 53' (pen.), 67', 72'	Stadium: Casey Fields; Attendance: 742; Referee: Lara Lee
	Penalties
	Bowen (penalty missed); Pollicina (penalty scored); Wilkinson (penalty missed)		(penalty scored) Dumont; (penalty scored) Ayres; (penalty scored) Markovski; (penalty scored) Murphy

== Statistics ==
=== Appearances and goals ===
Includes all competitions. Players with no appearances not included in the list.

No.	Pos.	Nat.	Name	A-League Women		Total	
No.	Pos.	Nat.	Name	Apps	Goals	Apps	Goals
1	GK	(Australia)	Sally James	12	0	12	0
3	DF	(Australia)	Naomi Thomas-Chinnama	14+2	0	16	0
4	DF	(Australia)	Chelsea Blissett	6+12	0	18	0
6	MF	(Australia)	Leticia McKenna	12+7	2	19	2
7	DF	(United States)	Julia Grosso	17+2	1	19	1
8	MF	(Australia)	Kaitlyn Torpey	19	2	19	2
9	FW	(Australia)	Holly McNamara	6	1	6	1
10	FW	(Australia)	Rhianna Pollicina	17+1	10	18	10
14	DF	(New Zealand)	Katie Bowen	19	0	19	0
15	DF	(Australia)	Emma Checker	12+3	0	15	0
16	DF	(Australia)	Karly Roestbakken	2+2	0	4	0
17	FW	(Australia)	Hannah Wilkinson	12+2	6	14	6
18	MF	(Australia)	Leah Davidson	13	0	13	0
19	FW	(Chile)	María José Rojas	10+1	5	11	5
21	DF	(Australia)	Isabella Accardo	0+8	0	8	0
22	FW	(Australia)	Bryleeh Henry	13+6	4	19	4
23	GK	(Australia)	Melissa Barbieri	7+3	0	10	0
24	MF	(Australia)	Daniela Galic	13+4	2	17	2
25	MF	(Australia)	Darcey Malone	0+12	0	12	0
33	GK	(Australia)	Sophia Varley	0+10	0	10	0
Player(s) transferred out but featured this season
13	FW	(Bosnia and Herzegovina)	Emina Ekic	5+1	4	6	4

=== Disciplinary record ===
Includes all competitions. The list is sorted by squad number when total cards are equal. Players with no cards not included in the list.

Rank	No.	Pos.	Nat.	Name	A-League Women			Total		
Rank	No.	Pos.	Nat.	Name	Yellow card	(yellow card) (yellow-red card)	Red card	Yellow card	(yellow card) (yellow-red card)	Red card
1	7	DF	(United States)	Julia Grosso	3	0	0	3	0	0
1	15	DF	(Australia)	Emma Checker	3	0	0	3	0	0
1	22	FW	(Australia)	Bryleeh Henry	3	0	0	3	0	0
1	24	MF	(Australia)	Daniela Galic	3	0	0	3	0	0
5	3	DF	(Australia)	Naomi Thomas-Chinnama	1	0	0	1	0	0
5	4	DF	(Australia)	Chelsea Blissett	1	0	0	1	0	0
5	10	FW	(Australia)	Rhianna Pollicina	1	0	0	1	0	0
5	24	MF	(Australia)	Daniela Galic	1	0	0	1	0	0
5	25	MF	(Australia)	Darcey Malone	1	0	0	1	0	0
Total					17	0	0	17	0	0

=== Clean sheets ===
Includes all competitions. The list is sorted by squad number when total clean sheets are equal. Numbers in parentheses represent games where both goalkeepers participated and both kept a clean sheet; the number in parentheses is awarded to the goalkeeper who was substituted on, whilst a full clean sheet is awarded to the goalkeeper who was on the field at the start of play. Goalkeepers with no clean sheets not included in the list.

Rank	No.	Nat.	Goalkeeper	A-League Women	Total
1	1	(Australia)	Sally James	4	4
2	23	(Australia)	Melissa Barbieri	3 (2)	3 (2)
3	33	(Australia)	Sophia Varley	0 (1)	0 (1)
Total				7 (3)	7 (3)
