= Emina Ekić =

Bosnian-American footballer (born 1999)

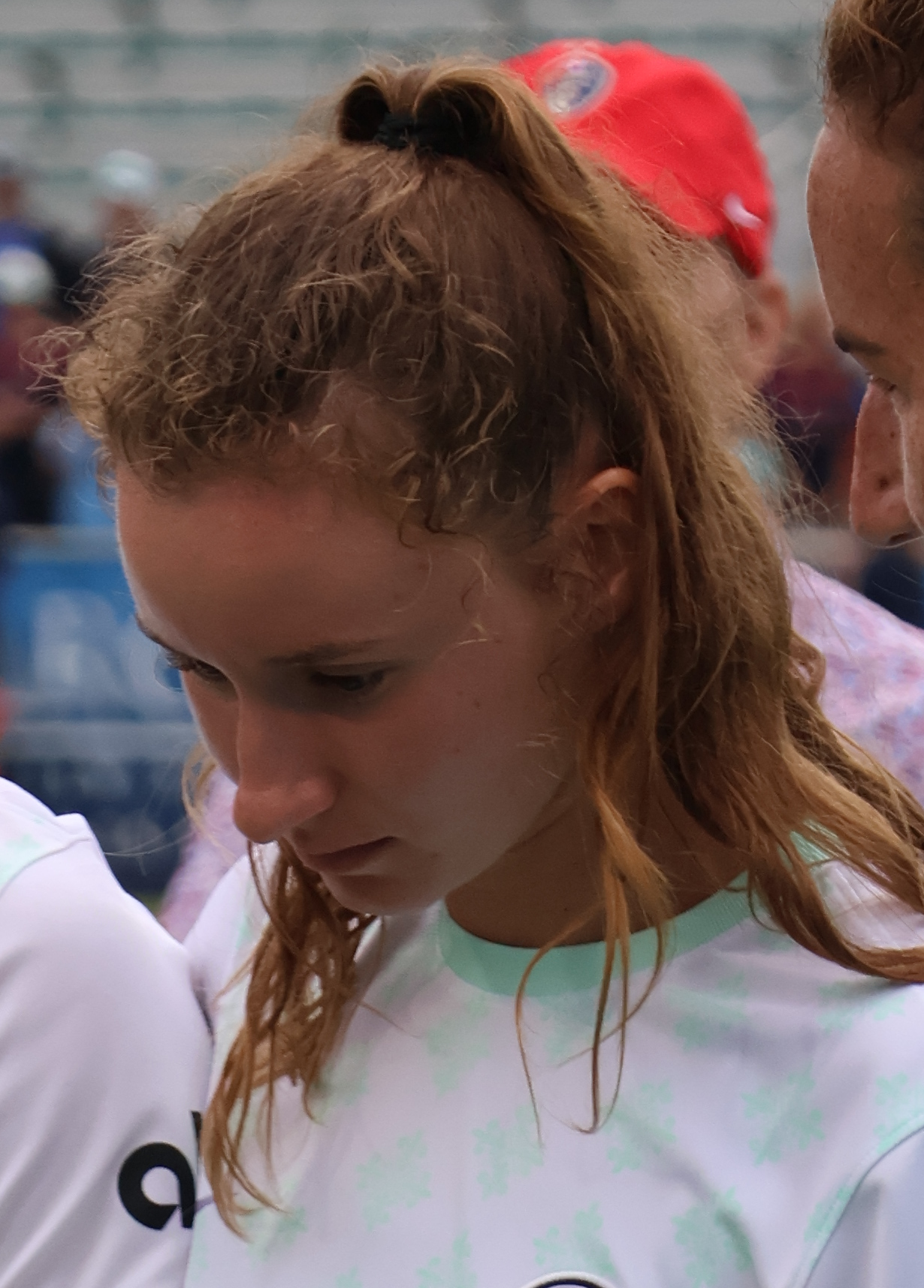
- Ekić with Racing Louisville FC in 2023

Personal information
- Full name: Emina Ekić
- Date of birth: 6 June 1999 (age 27)
- Place of birth: Louisville, Kentucky, United States
- Height: 1.63 m (5 ft 4 in)
- Positions: Midfielder; right winger

Team information
- Current team: Parma
- Number: 26

College career
Years	Team	Apps	(Gls)
2017–2020	Louisville Cardinals	66	(29)

Senior career*
Years	Team	Apps	(Gls)
2021–2023	Racing Louisville	38	(3)
2022–2023	→ Melbourne City (loan)	6	(4)
2023–2024	Melbourne City	18	(7)
2024–2025	Spokane Zephyr	24	(10)
2025–2026	Lexington SC	20	(2)
2026	Houston Dash	5	(0)
2026–	Parma	0	(0)

International career^{‡}
2019	United States U23	1	(0)
2023–	Bosnia and Herzegovina	23	(6)
- * Club domestic league appearances and goals as of 17 August 2026 ‡ National team caps and goals as of 9 October 2026

Emina Ekić (born 6 June 1999) is a professional footballer who plays as a midfielder for Serie A Women club Parma. Born in the United States, she plays for the Bosnia and Herzegovina national team.

Ekić played college soccer for the Louisville Cardinals, winning ACC Co-Freshman of the Year in 2017 and ACC Offensive Player of the Year in 2020. She was drafted fifth overall by Racing Louisville in the 2021 NWSL Draft. She then spent time with Melbourne City before joining Spokane Zephyr in the new USL Super League, winning the league's inaugural Player of the Year award in 2025. She also played for Lexington SC before briefly returning to the NWSL with the Houston Dash in 2026.

== Early life ==
Ekić was born in Louisville, Kentucky to parents who were both born in Bosnia and Herzegovina. Ekić attended DuPont Manual High School, where she was named the 2015–16 Kentucky Gatorade Player of the Year. Ekić also played for Javanon SC.

== College career ==
As a freshman in 2017, Ekić played in all 18 games for Louisville, starting 17 of them, and scored a team-high seven goals. She was named ACC Co-Freshman of the Year (alongside Alessia Russo), as well as being selected to the All-ACC second team and ACC All-Freshman team. In 2018, Ekić started all 18 games for the Cardinals, and earned first team All-ACC team honors.

In her junior season, Ekić started all 20 games. She scored 8 goals, including a game-winner vs. Vanderbilt on 15 September. In the 2020 fall season, Ekić started all nine games of the shortened ACC season. Ekić scored seven goals and was named ACC Offensive Player of the Year.

== Club career ==
=== Racing Louisville ===
Ekić declared for the 2021 NWSL Draft on 17 December 2020. She was drafted fifth overall by hometown expansion team Racing Louisville FC. Ekić signed a one-year contract with an option for an additional year.

She made her debut for Racing Louisville in their first match of the 2021 NWSL Challenge Cup. She scored Racing's first NWSL regular-season goal with a left-footed shot into the upper corner of the goal in a 2–0 win over the Washington Spirit, the club's first victory. Ekić finished her rookie season with 15 appearances, including three starts.

==== Loan to Melbourne City ====
In November 2022, Racing exercised its option on Ekić's contract and loaned her to Australian club Melbourne City until mid-February 2023. While on loan, Ekić suffered a broken ankle and missed the first weeks of the 2023 Racing Louisville season.

=== Melbourne City ===
In November 2023, Racing Louisville waived Ekić's contract two months early allowing her to return to Melbourne City. She signed a two-year contract with the Australian club. In June 2024, she left the club, exercising a clause in her contract to allow her to explore opportunities outside Australia.

=== Spokane Zephyr ===
On 17 July 2024, Ekić signed with Spokane Zephyr FC for the inaugural season of the USL Super League. She scored her first goal for the club in the 17th minute from a penalty kick. Her first goal was also the first goal in club history. She was named the inaugural USL Super League Player of the Year by both the league and Soccer Sheet, and included into All-League First Team.

=== Lexington ===
On 18 July 2025, Lexington SC acquired Ekić in a transfer with the Zephyr. Ekić debuted for Lexington on 23 August, starting and playing all 90 minutes of the club's season-opening draw with Fort Lauderdale United FC, recording two assists.

=== Houston Dash ===
On 28 April 2026, the Houston Dash announced the signing of Ekić on a contract through 2027, with the mutual option to extend another year, following a transfer from Lexington SC.

=== Parma ===
On 17 August 2026, Ekić joined Serie A Women club Parma after just 4 months with the Houston Dash.

== International career ==
Ekić played with the United States women's national under-23 soccer team at the Thorns Spring Invitational tournament in 2019.

In July 2023, the Bosnia and Herzegovina women's national football team called Ekić up to its senior team for friendly matches against Greece and Hungary.

== Career statistics ==
=== College ===
Team	Season	Regular season			ACC Tournament		NCAA Tournament		Total	
Team	Season	Division	Apps	Goals	Apps	Goals	Apps	Goals	Apps	Goals
Louisville Cardinals	2017	ACC	18	7	–		–		18	7
Louisville Cardinals	2018	ACC	17	6	1	0	1	1	19	7
Louisville Cardinals	2019	ACC	17	8	1	0	2	0	20	8
Louisville Cardinals	2020	ACC	8	6	1	1	–		9	7
Total			60	27	3	1	3	1	66	29

=== Club ===
As of match played 21 March 2026

Appearances and goals by club, season and competition
Club	Season	League			Cup (Note: Includes the NWSL Challenge Cup)		Playoffs (Note: Includes NWSL playoffs and A-League Finals series)		Total	
Club	Season	Division	Apps	Goals	Apps	Goals	Apps	Goals	Apps	Goals
Racing Louisville FC	2021	NWSL	15	1	4	0	—		19	1
Racing Louisville FC	2022	NWSL	19	2	6	1	—		25	3
Racing Louisville FC	2023	NWSL	4	0	3	0	—		7	0
Melbourne City FC (loan)	2022–23	A-League	6	4	—		—		6	4
Melbourne City FC	2023–24	A-League	18	7	—		3	1	21	8
Spokane Zephyr FC	2024–25	USLS	24	10	—		—		24	10
Lexington SC	2025–26	USLS	18	2	—		—		18	2
Career total			104	26	13	1	3	1	120	28

=== International ===
As of match played 9 October 2026

Appearances and goals by national team and year
National team	Year	Apps	Goals
Bosnia and Herzegovina	2023	6	0
Bosnia and Herzegovina	2024	8	1
Bosnia and Herzegovina	2025	2	1
Bosnia and Herzegovina	2026	7	4
Total		23	6

Scores and results list Bosnia and Herzegovina's goal tally first, score column indicates score after each Ekić goal.

List of international goals scored by Emina Ekić
No.	Date	Venue	Opponent	Score	Result	Competition
1.	25 October 2024	Bosnia and Herzegovina FA Training Centre, Zenica, Bosnia and Herzegovina	Serbia	1–0	2–2	UEFA Women's Euro 2025 qualifying play-offs
2.	25 February 2025	Inver Park, Larne, Northern Ireland	Northern Ireland	1–1	2–3	2025 UEFA Women's Nations League
3.	7 March 2026	Bosnia and Herzegovina FA Training Centre, Zenica, Bosnia and Herzegovina	Liechtenstein	7–1	13–1	2027 FIFA Women's World Cup qualification
4.	7 March 2026	Bosnia and Herzegovina FA Training Centre, Zenica, Bosnia and Herzegovina	Liechtenstein	8–1	13–1	2027 FIFA Women's World Cup qualification
5.	18 April 2026	Rheinpark Stadion, Vaduz, Liechtenstein	Liechtenstein	6–0	6–0	2027 FIFA Women's World Cup qualification
6.	9 October 2026	DG Arena, Podgorica, Montenegro	Montenegro	2–2	2–3	Friendly

== Honors ==
Individual

- USL Super League Player of the Year: 2024–25
- USL Super League All-League First Team: 2024–25
- ACC Offensive Player of the Year: 2020
- ACC Co-Freshman of the Year: 2017
- Second-team All-American: 2018, 2019
- Third-team All-American: 2020
- First-team All-ACC: 2018, 2019, 2020
- Second-team All-ACC: 2017
