= Kaitlyn Torpey =

Australian soccer player (born 2000)

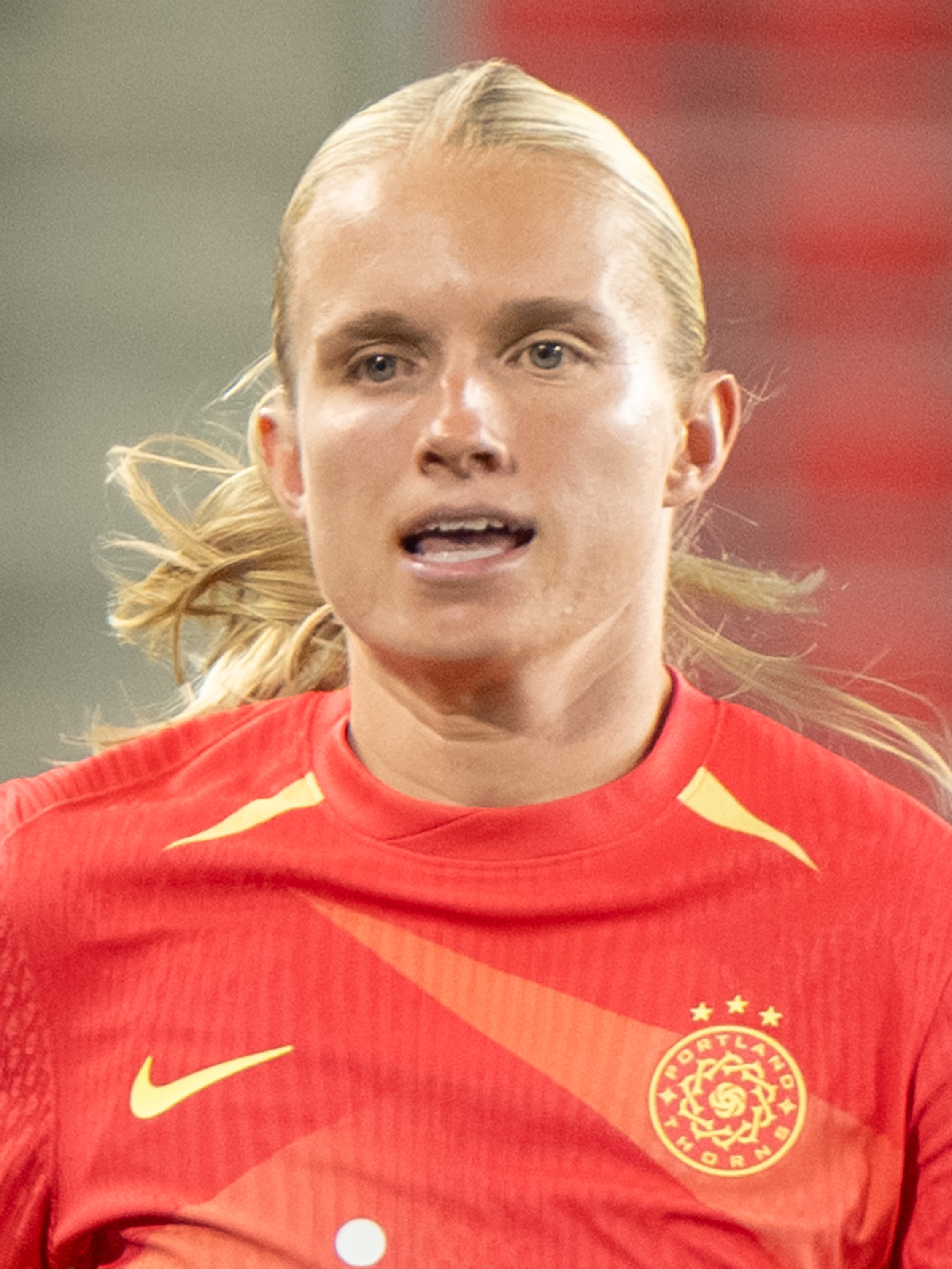
- Torpey with the Portland Thorns in 2025

Personal information
- Full name: Kaitlyn Grace Torpey
- Date of birth: 17 March 2000 (age 26)
- Place of birth: South Brisbane, Queensland, Australia
- Height: 1.65 m (5 ft 5 in)
- Positions: Full-back; wingback; winger

Team information
- Current team: Newcastle United
- Number: 18

Youth career
- 2013–2014: Olympic FC
- 2014–2017: Brisbane Roar

Senior career*
Years	Team	Apps	(Gls)
2016–2021	Brisbane Roar	43	(1)
2021–2024	Melbourne City	48	(6)
2023	Preston Lions	8	(8)
2024	San Diego Wave	14	(0)
2025	Portland Thorns	20	(0)
2026–	Newcastle United	10	(1)

International career^{‡}
2024–	Australia	30	(2)
- * Club domestic league appearances and goals as of 27 September 2026 ‡ National team caps and goals as of 10 October 2026

Kaitlyn Grace Torpey (/ˈtɔːr.pi/ TOR-pee; born 17 March 2000) is an Australian professional soccer player who plays as a full back, wingback or winger for Women's Super League 2 club Newcastle United and the Australia national team. Torpey has previously played for American clubs Portland Thorns, San Diego Wave and Australian clubs Melbourne City, Brisbane Roar and Preston Lions.

== Early life and education ==
Torpey was born and raised in Brisbane, Queensland, and attended Cavendish Road State High School.

Torpey began playing soccer at the age of nine after previously playing field hockey. In 2013, Torpey started playing for the U-13's Olympic FC Girls. She scored 27 goals in 21 matches in the 2013 season and finished 1st on the ladder. Torpey then joined QAS, where she played 38 matches and scored 13 goals when playing for the U13s and U14s. In 2016, she was named in the All-Star Team in her third NTC Challenge competition.

== Club career ==
=== Brisbane Roar ===
On 5 November 2016, 16-year-old Torpey made her professional debut for Brisbane Roar in a 2–1 win over Sydney FC. During her five-year spell with the Roar, she primarily played at right-back, making 43 appearances.

=== Melbourne City ===
In September 2021, Torpey signed with Melbourne City. In her first season, Torpey played in every match and made her 50th A-League appearance. She re-signed during the offseason, committing to Melbourne City for another two years. On 9 December 2022, Torpey scored her first goal for the club, a long-range strike in a 5–1 win over Newcastle Jets.

Torpey left Melbourne City after making 48 appearances and scoring 6 goals, having only missed one match in three consecutive seasons.

=== Preston Lions ===
Torpey joined NPL Victoria side Preston Lions FC during the 2023 A-League offseason. She scored 9 goals in 9 games before returning to Melbourne City.

=== San Diego Wave ===
On 6 February 2024, it was announced that Torpey had joined San Diego Wave FC on a two-year contract. Her transfer to the NWSL set a new record for an A-League Women player moving to another league. The reported fee of approximately $75,000 was double the previous Australian outgoing record and regarded as a new benchmark for A-League Women transfer fees in the global market.

Torpey made her debut for the Wave as a substitute on 15 March 2024 in an NWSL Challenge Cup victory against NJ/NY Gotham FC. She earned her first NWSL start on 3 May 2024, in a 2–1 defeat to Seattle Reign FC. Torpey scored her first goal with the Wave on 1 October 2024 in a CONCACAF W Champions Cup victory over Vancouver Whitecaps FC Girls Elite.

=== Portland Thorns ===
On 5 March 2025, Portland Thorns FC acquired Torpey in exchange for either $10,000 in intra-league transfer funds or $15,000 in allocation money, pending conditions met. Torpey made her debut on 15 March 2025 in the Thorns 1–3 loss to the Kansas City Current. In December 2025, Torpey left the club following the end of her contract.

=== Newcastle United ===
Torpey signed for Women's Super League 2 (WSL2) side Newcastle United on 16 January 2026, joining Australian manager Tanya Oxtoby at the club.

== International career ==
In October 2017, Torpey was called up for the Young Matildas squad for the 2017 AFC U19 Championship in China.

In February 2024, Torpey received her first senior call up to the Australian national team for the 2024 AFC Women's Olympic Qualifying Tournament third round against Uzbekistan. She made her debut in a 3–0 win on 24 February, playing on the left wing in place of Caitlin Foord for the first 45 minutes of the game. Torpey earned her first international start in the next match of the two-game series, scoring in the 22nd minute as the Matildas comfortably won 10–0.

On 4 June 2024, Torpey was named in the Matildas team which qualified for the Paris 2024 Olympics, her debut Olympics selection. Leading up to the tournament, Torpey struggled with a lower leg injury that caused her to miss a pre-Olympics friendly against Canada. Nevertheless, she was able to play in all three of the Matildas' Olympic matches, coming on as a substitute in the team's first two games versus Germany and Zambia and starting the final group stage match against the United States.

== Personal life ==
Torpey enjoys videography and photography in her time spare time. She has worked with the Professional Footballers Association and her various clubs to produce interviews with her teammates.

Torpey has coeliac disease, and therefore is gluten-free.

== Career statistics ==
=== Club ===
As of 27 September 2026

Appearances and goals by club, season and competition
Club	Season	League			Cup (Note: Includes the NWSL Challenge Cup and WSL Players Cup)		Playoffs (Note: Includes NWSL Playoffs and A-League Finals Series)		Continental (Note: Includes CONCACAF W Champions Cup)		Other		Total	
Club	Season	Division	Apps	Goals	Apps	Goals	Apps	Goals	Apps	Goals	Apps	Goals	Apps	Goals
Brisbane Roar	2016–17	W-League	10	0	—		—		—		—		10	0
Brisbane Roar	2017–18	W-League	10	0	—		1	0	—		—		11	0
Brisbane Roar	2018–19	W-League	7	0	—		1	0	—		—		8	0
Brisbane Roar	2019–20	W-League	3	0	—		—		—		—		3	0
Brisbane Roar	2020–21	W-League	10	1	—		1	0	—		—		11	1
Brisbane Roar	Total		40	1	—		3	0	—		—		43	1
Melbourne City	2021–22	A-League	14	3	—		2	0	—		—		16	3
Melbourne City	2022–23	A-League	18	2	—		1	0	—		—		19	2
Melbourne City	2023–24	A-League	13	1	—		0	0	—		—		13	1
Melbourne City	Total		45	6	—		3	0	—		—		48	6
Preston Lions	2023	NPL	8	8	—		—		—		—		8	8
San Diego Wave	2024	NWSL	14	0	1	0	—		2	1	0 (Note: Includes NWSL x Liga MX Femenil Summer Cup)	0	17	1
Portland Thorns	2025	NWSL	18	0	—		2	0	2	0	—		22	0
Newcastle United	2025–26	WSL2	6	0	—		—		—		—		6	0
Newcastle United	2026–27	WSL2	4	1	0	0	—		—		—		4	0
Newcastle United	Total		10	1	0	0	—		—		—		10	1
Career total			135	16	1	0	8	0	4	1	0	0	148	17

=== International ===
As of match played 10 October 2026

Appearances and goals by national team and year
National team	Year	Apps	Goals
Australia	2024	10	1
Australia	2025	11	1
Australia	2026	9	0
Total		30	2

Scores and results list Australia's goal tally first, score column indicates score after each Torpey goal.

List of international goals scored by Kaitlyn Torpey
No.	Date	Venue	Opponent	Score	Result	Competition
1.	28 February 2024	Marvel Stadium, Melbourne, Australia	Uzbekistan	5–0	10–0	2024 AFC Women's Olympic Qualifying Tournament
2.	30 May 2025	Marvel Stadium, Melbourne, Australia	Argentina	2–0	2–0	Friendly

== Honours ==
San Diego Wave

- NWSL Challenge Cup: 2024

Australia

- FIFA Series: 2026
