= Julia Grosso (American soccer) =

American soccer player (born 1998)

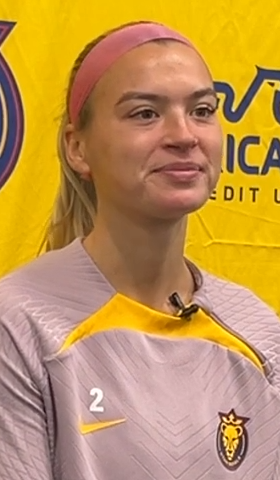
- Grosso with the Utah Royals in 2024

Personal information
- Full name: Julia Grosso
- Date of birth: December 10, 1998 (age 27)
- Place of birth: Sunrise, Florida, United States
- Height: 5 ft 5 in (1.65 m)
- Position: Defender

Team information
- Current team: Fort Lauderdale United FC
- Number: 27

Youth career
- Sunrise SC
- St. Thomas Aquinas High School

College career
Years	Team	Apps	(Gls)
2017–2021	Kentucky Wildcats	84	(4)

Senior career*
Years	Team	Apps	(Gls)
2022–2024	Melbourne City	37	(2)
2024	Utah Royals	0	(0)
2025–	Fort Lauderdale United FC	27	(0)
- * Club domestic league appearances and goals as of 03:34, May 18, 2026 (UTC)

Julia Grosso (born December 10, 1998) is an American professional soccer player who plays as a defender for USL Super League club Fort Lauderdale United. She played college soccer for the Kentucky Wildcats and began her professional career with A-League Women club Melbourne City, receiving the club's Player of the Year award in 2023.

== Early life ==
Grosso was born in Sunrise, Florida and played for Sunrise SC and St. Thomas Aquinas High School, with whom she won the 4A girls state championship in 2015 and 2017.

== College career ==
After appearing in every game in her first season with Kentucky in an attacking role, Grosso moved to a defensive role as a sophomore. She was a team captain in 2020, when the season was cut short by the COVID-19 pandemic. She returned for a fifth year, again as a team captain.

Before her final season, she was named to the SEC Preseason Watch List.

The Kentucky website lists her height as 5–8, but on her personal site, she is listed at 5–5.

== Club career ==
=== Melbourne City ===
In October 2022, Melbourne City announced Grosso's signing with the Australian club. She was signed as a winger but was noted for her ability to play as a full-back as well. The team first became aware of her via a highlight reel delivered by her agent and first met the coach over Zoom. She began her first season as a left winger, and went on to become the Melbourne City FC Player of the Year in her first season. She helped Melbourne City claim third place in the A-League's 2022–23 season, then re-signed on a two-year deal starting in 2023. She was later utilized as an inverted full-back that transitions to midfield with possession of the ball, being noted for her ability to play up and down whole field. In June 2024, she left the club, exercising a clause in her contract to allow her to explore opportunities outside Australia.

=== Utah Royals ===
In September 2024, it was announced that she had joined NWSL club Utah Royals.

=== Fort Lauderdale United FC ===
On January 21, 2025 Grosso signed with USL Super League club Fort Lauderdale United FC

== Career statistics ==
As of match played March 14, 2026

Appearances and goals by club, season and competition
Club	Season	League			National cup		Continental		Other		Total	
Club	Season	Division	Apps	Goals	Apps	Goals	Apps	Goals	Apps	Goals	Apps	Goals
Melbourne City	2022–23	A-League Women	19	1	—		—		—		19	1
Melbourne City	2023–24	A-League Women	12	1	—		—		—		12	1
Utah Royals	2024	NWSL	0	0	0	0	0	0	0	0	0	0
Fort Lauderdale United FC	2024–25	USL Super League	16	0	—		—		0	0	16	0
Career total			47	2	0	0	0	0	0	0	47	2
