= Tijan McKenna =

Croatian footballer (born 2004)

Personal information
- Full name: Tijan Sally McKenna
- Date of birth: 8 September 2004 (age 22)
- Place of birth: Cockburn Central, Western Australia, Australia
- Position: Defender

Team information
- Current team: Vålerenga

Senior career*
Years	Team	Apps	(Gls)
2021–2023	Perth Glory FC	15	(0)
2022	South Melbourne	6	(1)
2022–2023	Heidelberg United	21	(2)
2023–2024	Melbourne City	13	(0)
2024–2026	Perth Glory	39	(3)
2026–	Vålerenga	0	(0)

International career
- Australia U16
- Australia U20
- * Club domestic league appearances and goals as of 24 March 2026

Tijan Sally McKenna (Croatian: [tijan]; born 8 September 2004) is an Australian soccer player who plays as a defender for Toppserien club Vålerenga IF.

Beginning her career at A-League Women club Perth Glory, McKenna played for National Premier Leagues Victoria Women (NPL Victoria Women) sides South Melbourne and Heidelberg United during the offseason. She later joined Melbourne City, before returning to Perth Glory and later moving to Toppserien club Vålerenga IF.

Born in Perth to a family of Anglo-Celtic and Croatian descent, she is eligible to represent either Australia or Croatia internationally. Initially playing for Australia at under-16 and under-20 level, she was later called up for the Croatia senior national team, though was never capped. In 2026, she stated her intention to recommit to representing the Australia senior national team.

== Early life ==
McKenna was born on 8 September 2004 in Perth, and grew up in the suburb of Cockburn Central. She is of Croatian descent. Her older sister, Leticia is also a soccer player. As a junior McKenna joined Cockburn City soccer club. She attended John Curtin College of the Arts in Fremantle. McKenna joined Football West National Training Centre (FW NTC) under-15 soccer team by February 2019 to compete in Western Australia's Premier League Reserves.

== Club career ==
McKenna debuted for the W-League (renamed A-League Women) team Perth Glory FC on 9 January 2021 in their 0-1 loss to Adelaide United. Australian news website Impetus Football wrote in 2022 that she was "another of Perth Glory's fast-rising stars" while playing for the club.

During the A-League off-season (mid-2022), she was loaned to National Premier Leagues Victoria Women (NPLV) side South Melbourne FC before being loaned to another NPLV side Heidelberg United FC for rest of 2022 and all of 2023 A-League off-seasons.

Six months later, she signed for A-League side Melbourne City FC (rejoining her sister) and played 13 matches during their 2023–24 season. Ahead of the 2024–25 season, McKenna returned to Perth Glory.

On 17 July 2026, it was announced that McKenna was joining Norwegian club Vålerenga IF, reuniting with former Perth teammate Hana Lowry, who had joined a few months prior.

== International career ==
McKenna was an Australia youth international, before being called up to represent Croatia at senior international level. In 2019, she played for the Australia women's national under-16 soccer team at the 2019 AFC U-16 Women's Championship.

In an April 2026 interview with The West Australian, McKenna announced her intention to recommit to playing for Australia in an effort to be selected for the senior national team following her sister Leticia's senior international début for Australia.
