= María José Rojas =

Chilean footballer (born 1987)

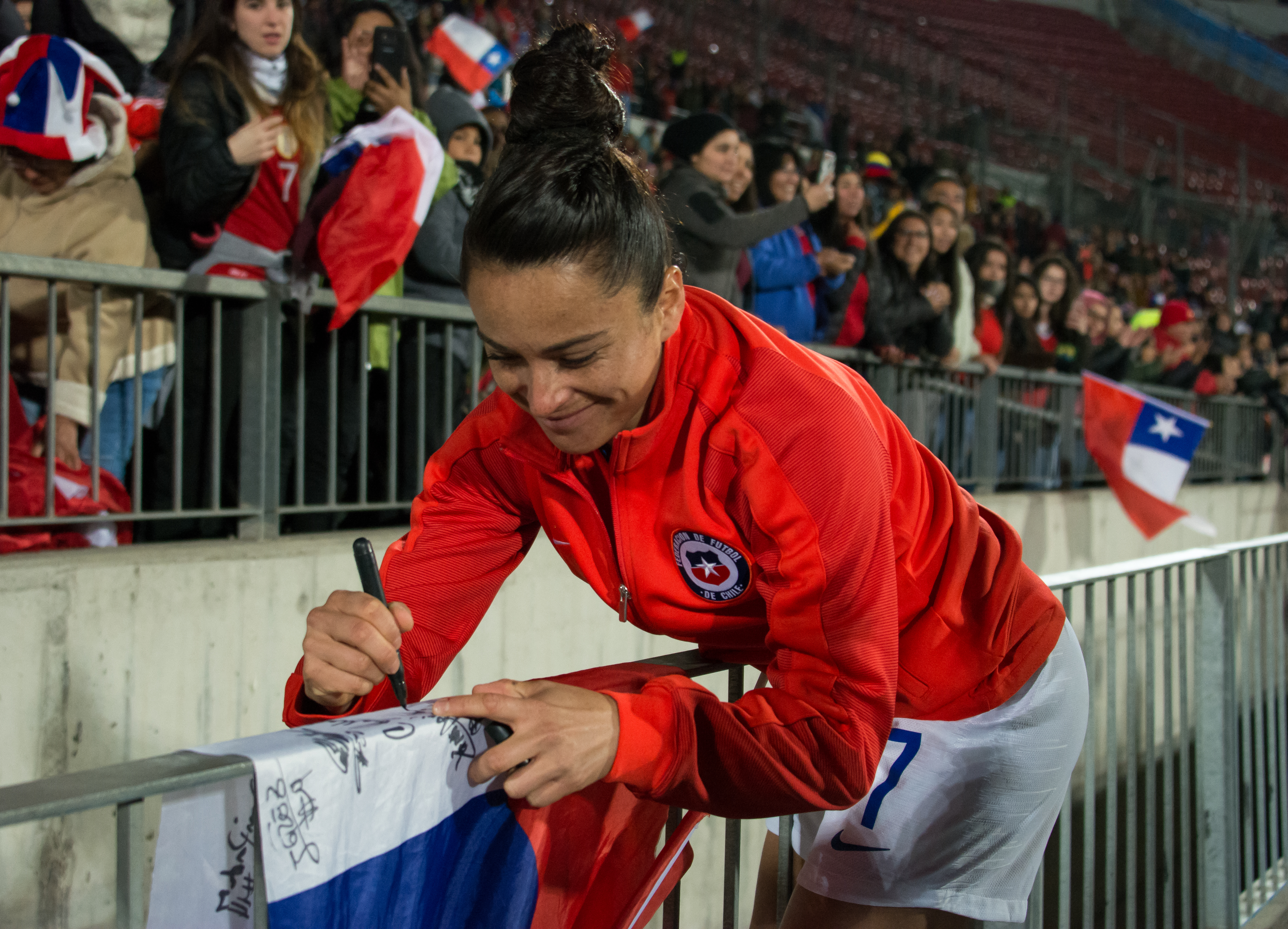
- Rojas with Chile in 2019

Personal information
- Full name: María José Alondra Rojas Pino
- Date of birth: 17 December 1987 (age 38)
- Place of birth: Santiago, Chile
- Height: 1.63 m (5 ft 4 in)
- Position: Forward

Team information
- Current team: Salisbury Inter

College career
Years	Team	Apps	(Gls)
2010–2012	UTSA Roadrunners	58	(18)

Senior career*
Years	Team	Apps	(Gls)
2003–2009	Universidad de Chile	23	(63)
2014	Gulf Coast Texans		(5)
2014	Herforder SV	4	(2)
2015–2017	Adelaide University		(65)
2017	Gintra Universitetas	2	(0)
2018	Orca Kamogawa		(1)
2018	Canberra United	8	(1)
2019	Slavia Praha	2	(0)
2019	Santiago Morning	6	(9)
2020	Salisbury Inter	14	(24)
2020–2021	Adelaide United	12	(1)
2021–2022	Sydney FC	11	(5)
2022	Salisbury Inter	9	(14)
2022	Apollon Ladies	8	(7)
2022–2023	Melbourne City	11	(5)
2023	Flinders United		
2023–2024	Canberra United	13	(0)
2024	Santiago Morning	24	(12)
2025	Flinders United	16	(15)
2026–	Salisbury Inter	24	(20)

International career
2006	Chile U20		(2)
2011–	Chile	57	(12)
Medal record
Women's football
Representing Chile
South American Games
Silver medal – second place	2014 Santiago	Team
- * Club domestic league appearances and goals as of 2 October 2026

María José Alondra Rojas Pino (born 17 December 1987), informally known as Cote Rojas, is a Chilean professional footballer currently playing for Australian club Salisbury Inter. Rojas a 13-year veteran of the La Roja, remains one of the highest scoring strikers with 11 international goals in 44 international games.

Rojas was the first female player to be contracted internationally, paving the way for the likes of Tianne Endler and Yanara Aedo and many others of her national team to follow. Rojas has a professional playing resume that has thus far spanned 4 continents and 6 countries. Her time in countries such as Germany, the United States, Japan, Lithuania, Czech Republic and Australia has enabled her to develop a global football experience. Her improvement and ability is supported by a large contingent of goals which has proven her calibre, where she has made a name for herself as 'the Chilean international star' known for her ability to score goals. Her abilities and style have been compared with her male compatriots Alexis Sánchez and Arturo Vidal "Cote Rojas has impetus of Arturo, the technique the wonder child and the grip of the Pitbull".

Rojas is a 13-year veteran for Chile National team (La Roja) and remains one of the highest scoring strikers for the La Roja with 11 international goals in 44 international games. The Fifa. Com player card overviewed Rojas as "Rojas brings character, experience and a goalscoring threat to the Roja set-up. One of the country's leading players, she is a forward who likes to drop wide to use her pace, while her other assets include a fine touch and dribbling skills. She has played in five continents and scored the goal that give Chile victory against Uruguay at the 2018 Copa America, their first in the competition and one that kept them in contention for a place at France 2019".

Rojas career includes playing in the 2019 women's world cup, and in the Champions League. Rojas played with Gintra SK in 2018 and was part of the Slava Praga 2019 Champions League campaign.

Rojas has two championships within her professional clubs. Rojas scored the winning goal for the UTSA Roadrunners to win their first ever championship in the US and she is currently a high scoring impact player for the Santiago Morning. Rojas helped the Santiago Morning obtain their second championship in 2019 where she played in the second part of the season scoring 6 goals in 5 games. The Santiago Morning also represented Chile in the 2019 Copa Libertoradores in Ecuador, reaching the quarter-finals playing 3 games. Maria Jose Rojas scored a hat trick in game 3 of their Copa Libertadores campaign.

Rojas played with Canberra United in the W-League, was granted a Global Talent visa by the Australian Government to play and develop football in Australia, and later become an Australian citizen in 2025. Rojas is regarded as an ambassador for young players craving to be on the world stage.

María José Rojas secured the A-Leagues Fan Player of the Year accolade for the 2022/23 season, for her performance with Melbourne City, boasting a record of 5 goals in 11 matches. The award, chosen by supporters, underscores Rojas' contributions to Melbourne City during the season.

Rojas fought for women's rights, which she continually demonstrates leadership in this field by supporting other players and speaking to the media about issues which affect the women's game.

== Club career ==
Rojas played Division 1 competitions in Chile (Priera Division and Copa Libertadores), Germany (Bundesliga), United States (W- League), Lithuania (A Lyga and Champions League), Japan (J2 League) and currently Australia (W- League and WNPL).

In 2019 Rojas played as a forward for SK Slavia Praha (women) in the Czech First Division (women) and with the Santiago Morning in the Chilean first Division and in the Copa Libertadores in 2019.

The Santiago Morning are the two-time champions in 2018 and 2019 in the Chilean premier division.

Rojas signed with Canberra United for the 2018-19 W-League season.

Rojas played two seasons in the South Australian WNPL, scoring 65 goals in both the 2016 and 2017 seasons, winning two golden boots for those seasons. Rojas accumulated nine goals at Copa Bicentenario in 2010 with Chile national team and in 2008 she scored 63 goals in 23 matches with her club Universidad de Chile, becoming the Goalscorer of the Year.

In 2020, Rojas played for Salisbury Inter in the 2020 Women's NPL (WNPL), scoring 27 goals in 18 matches and winning the Shirley Brown Medal as the WNPL Player of the Year. At the end of the year, she returned to the W-League, signing with Adelaide United.

In September 2021, Rojas joined Sydney FC.

In August 2022, she joined Cypriot club Apollon Ladies.

In November 2022, Rojas returned to Australia, joining Melbourne City as an injury replacement for Hannah Wilkinson for two months.

In May 2023, she switched to Flinders United in the South Australia NPL Women.

In September 2023, it was announced that Rojas would return to Canberra United.

In March 2024, Rojas departed Canberra United to return to Chilean club Santiago Morning.

In January 2025, Rojas returned to Australia and rejoined Flinders United. In March 2026, she returned to Salisbury Inter, winning the 2026 WNPL.

== International career ==
Rojas was a member of the Chile squad that won the silver medal at the 2014 South American Games.

She also scored two goals at the 2018 Copa América Femenina, where Chile qualified to a FIFA Women's World Cup for the first time in its history.

Rojas was listed as the 'Player to Watch' for the La Roja in the 2019 Women's World Cup as she was the highest scoring player in the Chile squad wand as Letelier's most dangerous weapon up front.

=== International goals ===
Scores and results list Chile's goal tally first

No.	Date	Venue	Opponent	Score	Result	Competition
1	22 October 2011	Estadio Omnilife, Zapopan, Mexico	Trinidad and Tobago	3–0	3–0	2011 Pan American Games
2	10 April 2018	Estadio La Portada, La Serena, Chile	Uruguay	1–0	1–0	2018 Copa América Femenina
3	12 April 2018	Estadio La Portada, La Serena, Chile	Peru	5–0	5–0	2018 Copa América Femenina

== Honours ==
Salisbury Inter

- WNPL: 2026

Chile

- South American Games Silver medal: 2014
- Copa América Silver medal: 2018
