= Leah Davidson =

Australian football player

Personal information
- Full name: Leah Davidson
- Date of birth: 28 March 2001 (age 25)
- Place of birth: Australia
- Position: Midfielder

Team information
- Current team: Charlton Athletic

Youth career
- 2013–2016: Palm Beach
- 2016–2017: Brisbane Roar QAS

Senior career*
Years	Team	Apps	(Gls)
2018–2020	Brisbane Roar	11	(1)
2020–2026	Melbourne City	80	(0)
2022	APIA Leichhardt	15	(2)
2026–	Charlton Athletic	0	(0)

International career^{‡}
2022–	Australia U23	6	(0)
2024–	Australia	4	(1)
- * Club domestic league appearances and goals as of 10 July 2025 ‡ National team caps and goals as of 17 May 2025

Leah Davidson (born 28 March 2001) is an Australian professional soccer player who plays as a midfielder for Charlton Athletic and the Australia national team.

== Early life ==
Davidson grew up on the Gold Coast and attended All Saints Anglican School throughout her upbringing. She played junior football for Palm Beach in the local Gold Coast leagues and scored 13 goals in 18 matches during the 2013 season, which led to selection in multiple Queensland state teams in the following years. In 2016, she was invited to play for Brisbane Roar's QAS junior team.

== Club career ==
=== Youth career ===
Throughout her entire Brisbane Roar junior career, she played 23 matches and scored 6 goals.

Davidson was also selected to play for the Australian under-20 team during the qualification process for the 2019 AFC U-19 Women's Championship.

=== Brisbane Roar ===
At the age of 17, she competed in the women's NPL in Queensland. She was part of the Championship winning side with Roar/NTC during the 2018 season and scored seven goals in 16 matches.

On 28 October 2018, Leah Davidson played her first professional career game in a 1–1 draw against Perth Glory coming on as a substitute for Allira Toby.

=== Melbourne City ===
In November 2020, Davidson joined Melbourne City.

=== Charlton Athletic ===
On 24 July 2026, Davidson signed a two-year deal with Women's Super League club Charlton Athletic, ahead of the 2026–27 season.

== International career ==
In November 2024, Davidson received her first senior call up to the Australian national team.

== International goals ==
No.	Date	Venue	Opponent	Score	Result	Competition
1.	7 December 2024	Kardina Park, Geelong, Australia	Chinese Taipei	1–0	6–0	Friendly

== Honours ==
=== Australian Domestic ===
- W-League/A-League Women Premiership:

Winner (3): 2023–24, 2024–25, 2025–26
Runners-up (1): 2021–22

- W-League/A-League Women Championship

Winners (2): 2020, 2026
Runners-up (1): 2024

=== Continental ===
- AFC Women's Champions League
  - Runners-up (1): 2024–25
