= Hannah Wilkinson =

New Zealand footballer (born 1992)

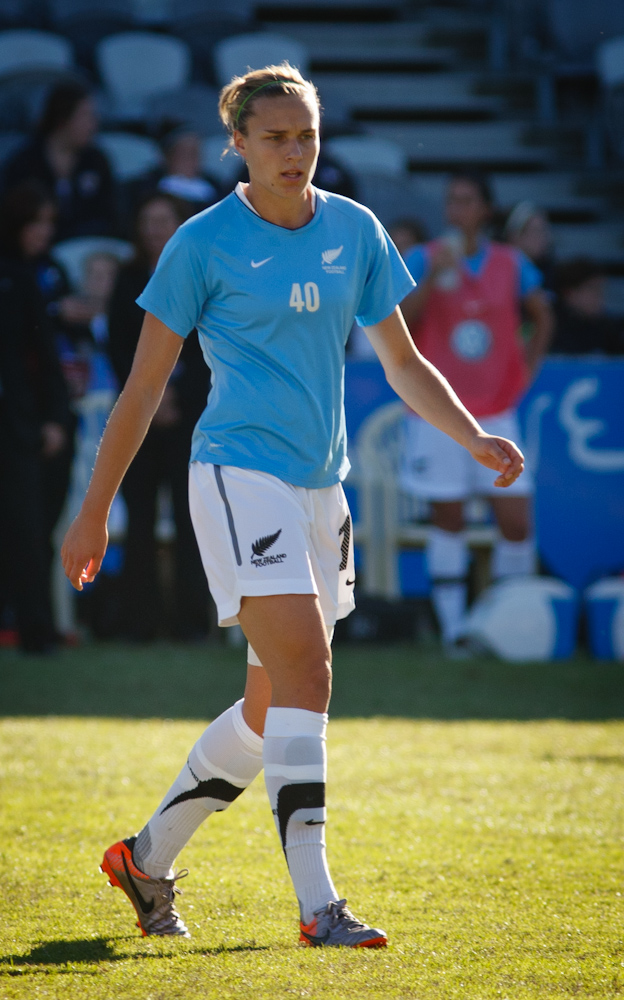
- Hannah Wilkinson in 2011

Personal information
- Full name: Hannah Lilian Wilkinson
- Date of birth: 28 May 1992 (age 34)
- Place of birth: Whangārei, New Zealand
- Height: 1.76 m (5 ft 9 in)
- Position: Striker

Youth career
- 2005–2009: Kamo High School
- North Force
- 2010–2011: Glenfield Rovers

College career
Years	Team	Apps	(Gls)
2012–2016	Tennessee Volunteers	31	(17)

Senior career*
Years	Team	Apps	(Gls)
2017–2018	Vittsjö GIK	35	(3)
2019–2020	Sporting CP	15	(12)
2020	Djurgårdens IF	17	(0)
2021	MSV Duisburg	10	(3)
2021–2024	Melbourne City	51	(30)
Total		128	(48)

International career^{‡}
2010–2012	New Zealand U-20	15	(9)
2010–2024	New Zealand	125	(32)
- * Club domestic league appearances and goals as of 27 May 2024 ‡ National team caps and goals as of 20 February 2024

Hannah Lilian Wilkinson (born 28 May 1992) is a New Zealand former footballer who played for Tennessee Volunteers in the American college system, Vittsjö GIK and Djurgårdens IF in the Swedish Damallsvenskan, Sporting CP in the Portuguese Campeonato Nacional Feminino, MSV Duisburg in the German Bundesliga, and Melbourne City in the Australian A-League Women (formerly the W-League). She represented New Zealand internationally and made 125 appearances for them.

== College career ==
Wilkinson joined the Tennessee Volunteers as a sophomore in 2012. She received first team All-South-eastern Conference honors in her debut season. Wilkinson lead the SEC with eight goals and 17 points in conference play. Despite joining the team after the London Olympics, five matches into the season, Wilkinson led Tennessee in goals (eight), points (17), shots (48), shot percentage (.167) and match-winners (four). For her heroics against the Aggies and the Rebels, she received the SEC Offensive Player of the Week, Top Drawer Soccer National Team of the Week, Soccer America Team of the Week and TSWA Women's Soccer Player of the Week accolades. In November of her senior season the NCAA granted her eligibility for the 2015 season. She was originally assigned a sophomore status when she enrolled at Tennessee after previously attending classes at Auckland University of Technology for one year. She tore her ACL in August 2015 and was granted a medical redshirt year.

== Club career ==
Wilkinson signed for Damallsvenskan side Vittsjö GIK in March 2017. In October 2018, Wilkinson tore her anterior cruciate ligament during a cup game against Jitex BK.

In July 2019, Wilkinson signed with Portuguese Campeonato Nacional team Sporting CP.

In August 2021, Wilkinson joined Australian club Melbourne City. In June 2024, she departed the club at the end of her contract as their all-time leading goalscorer.

In October 2024, Wilkinson announced her retirement from football.

== International career ==
=== National youth teams ===
Wilkinson first played for the New Zealand under 20 side in January 2010 and impressed national selector John Herdman with 5 goals in 3 games, including a hat-trick in her first, earning herself a call up to the senior side for friendlies against Australia and a trip to the Cyprus Cup. In 2010, she represented New Zealand at the 2010 FIFA U-20 Women's World Cup, appearing in all three group games. She also appeared in all three group games for New Zealand during the 2012 FIFA U-20 Women's World Cup, which took place in Japan.

=== Senior national team ===
Wilkinson made her senior international debut for New Zealand in the starting lineup in a friendly against Australia on 17 February 2010. She made her first FIFA Women's World Cup appearance in the 2011 FIFA Women's World Cup, appearing in all three group matches as a substitute. In the last match, she scored in the 94th minute to force a draw with Mexico. Wilkinson appeared in three of New Zealand's four matches in the 2012 London Olympics. She played of all New Zealand's three matches at the 2015 FIFA Women's World Cup in Canada. She started in all three of New Zealand's matches at the 2016 Olympics in Brazil.

In April 2019, Wilkinson was named to the final 23-player squad for the 2019 FIFA Women's World Cup, after a remarkable recovery from her ACL injury.

On 27 July 2021, she played her 100th match for New Zealand during the 2020 Summer Olympics.

On 20 July 2023, she scored the opening goal of the 2023 FIFA Women's World Cup on home soil in a 1–0 victory against Norway, in what was their first win in the FIFA Women's World Cup.

== Selected International goals ==
No.	Date	Venue	Opponent	Score	Result	Competition
1.	29 September 2010	North Harbour Stadium, Auckland, New Zealand	Vanuatu	6–0	14–0	2010 OFC Women's Championship
2.	29 September 2010	North Harbour Stadium, Auckland, New Zealand	Vanuatu	9–0	14–0	2010 OFC Women's Championship
3.	29 September 2010	North Harbour Stadium, Auckland, New Zealand	Vanuatu	11–0	14–0	2010 OFC Women's Championship
4.	29 September 2010	North Harbour Stadium, Auckland, New Zealand	Vanuatu	13–0	14–0	2010 OFC Women's Championship
5.	6 October 2010	North Harbour Stadium, Auckland, New Zealand	Solomon Islands	6–0	8–0	2010 OFC Women's Championship
6.	8 October 2010	North Harbour Stadium, Auckland, New Zealand	Papua New Guinea	4–0	11–0	2010 OFC Women's Championship
7.	8 October 2010	North Harbour Stadium, Auckland, New Zealand	Papua New Guinea	5–0	11–0	2010 OFC Women's Championship
8.	15 May 2011	Central Coast Stadium, Gosford, Australia	Australia	1–1	1–2	Friendly
9.	5 July 2011	Rhein-Neckar-Arena, Sinsheim, Germany	Mexico	2–2	2–2	2011 FIFA Women's World Cup
10.	11 February 2012	FC Dallas Stadium, Frisco, United States	United States	1–0	1–2	Friendly
11.	31 March 2012	Toll Stadium, Whangārei, New Zealand	Papua New Guinea	1–0	8–0	2012 OFC Women's Olympic Qualifying Tournament
12.	4 April 2012	PMRL Stadium, Port Moresby, Papua New Guinea	Papua New Guinea	3–0	7–0	2012 OFC Women's Olympic Qualifying Tournament
13.	8 March 2013	GSZ Stadium, Larnaca, Cyprus	Italy	1–0	2–0	2013 Cyprus Women's Cup
14.	13 March 2013	GSZ Stadium, Larnaca, Cyprus	Switzerland	2–1	2–1	2013 Cyprus Women's Cup
15.	25 September 2013	Stade St-Germain, Savièse, Switzerland	China	1–0	4–0	2013 Valais Women's Cup
16.	27 October 2013	Candlestick Park, San Francisco, United States	United States	1–3	1–4	Friendly
17.	30 October 2013	Columbus Crew Stadium, Columbus, United States	United States	1–1	1–1	Friendly
18.	5 March 2014	Tasos Markos Stadium, Paralimni, Cyprus	Republic of Ireland	1–1	1–1	2014 Cyprus Women's Cup
19.	7 March 2014	Tasos Markos Stadium, Paralimni, Cyprus	Switzerland	1–0	1–2	2014 Cyprus Women's Cup
20.	15 January 2015	Kempinski Hotel Belek, Belek, Turkey	Denmark	2–1	3–2	Friendly
21.	8 February 2015	Bill McKinlay Park, Auckland, New Zealand	North Korea	1–0	1–1	Friendly
22.	3 March 2015	Estadio Municipal, La Roda, Spain	Spain	1–2	2–2	Friendly
23.	15 June 2015	Investors Group Field, Winnipeg, Canada	China	2–2	2–2	2015 FIFA Women's World Cup
24.	28 July 2016	Estádio Luso Brasileiro, Rio de Janeiro, Brazil	South Africa	1–0	4–1	Friendly
25.	15 September 2017	Dick's Sporting Goods Park, Commerce City, United States	United States	1–2	1–3	Friendly
26.	10 March 2020	Estádio Algarve, Faro/Loulé, Portugal	Norway	1–0	1–2	2020 Algarve Cup
27.	12 April 2022	Canberra Stadium, Canberra, Australia	Australia	1–3	1–3	Friendly
28.	6 April 2023	Marden Sports Complex, Alanya, Turkey	Iceland	1–1	1–1	Friendly
29.	20 July 2023	Eden Park, Auckland, New Zealand	Norway	1–0	1–0	2023 FIFA Women's World Cup
30.	19 February 2024	FFS Football Stadium, Apia, Samoa	Solomon Islands	2–0	11–1	2024 OFC Women's Olympic Qualifying Tournament
31.	19 February 2024	FFS Football Stadium, Apia, Samoa	Solomon Islands	7–1	11–1	2024 OFC Women's Olympic Qualifying Tournament
32.	6 April 2024	Rugby League Park, Christchurch, New Zealand	Thailand	1–0	4–0	Friendly

== Honours and awards ==
=== League ===
- Northern Region Premier Women's League Championship: 2010, 2011
- National Youth Women's League Championship: 2011

=== Individual ===
- Burridge Cup: 2008, 2009
- 2011 NZF Young Player of the Year
- 2012 All-SEC 1st Team
- 2012 NSCAA/Continental Tire Women's NCAA Division I All-American 3rd Team

== Personal life ==
Aside from soccer, Wilkinson says she enjoys playing the drums and guitar and surfing. She has released two single songs on Spotify. Waiting for the Sun was released in January 2019 and the second, Set Me Free, in April 2019.

Wilkinson is openly gay.

She graduated from Harvard Extension School with a Masters of Liberal Arts in 2024.
