= 2017 AFC U-16 Women's Championship qualification =

Tournament details
- Host countries: Thailand (Group A); China (Group B); Bangladesh (Group C); Vietnam (Group D)
- Dates: 25 August – 5 September 2016
- Teams: 24 (from 1 confederation)
- Venues: 4 (in 4 host cities)

Tournament statistics
- Matches played: 50
- Goals scored: 332 (6.64 per match)
- Attendance: 17,083 (342 per match)
- Top scorer(s): (Australia) Sofia Sakalis (Myanmar) San Thaw Thaw (11 goals each)

The 2017 AFC U-16 Women's Championship qualification was a women's under-16 football competition which decided the participating teams of the 2017 AFC U-16 Women's Championship.

A total of 24 teams entered the qualification tournament, which decided four of the eight participating teams in the final tournament held in Thailand.

== Draw ==
Of the 47 AFC member associations, a total of 27 teams entered the competition, with North Korea, Japan, China and the host nation Thailand automatically qualified for the final tournament by their position as the top four teams of the 2015 AFC U-16 Women's Championship and thus did not participate in the qualifying competition, except for Thailand which decided to also participate in the qualifying competition.

The draw for the qualifiers was held on 19 May 2016, 15:00 MYT (UTC+8), at the AFC House in Kuala Lumpur, Malaysia. The 24 teams were drawn into four groups of six teams.

The teams were seeded according to their performance in the previous season in 2015 AFC U-16 Women's Championship final tournament and qualification. The following restrictions were also applied:

- The three teams which indicated their intention to serve as qualification group hosts prior to the draw were drawn into separate groups.

Automatically qualified for final tournament and not participating in qualification
1. **North Korea**; 2. **Japan**; 3. **China**
Participating in qualification
| Pot 1 | Pot 2 | Pot 3 | Pot 4 | Pot 5 (unranked) |
| 4. **Thailand** **(H, Q)**; 5. **South Korea**; 6. Uzbekistan; 7. Iran | 8. Chinese Taipei; 9. **Australia**; 10. Myanmar; 11. India | 12. **Bangladesh** **(H)**; 13. Vietnam **(H)**; 14. Philippines; 15. Jordan | 16. Hong Kong; 17. United Arab Emirates | Guam; Iraq; Kyrgyzstan; **Laos**; Lebanon **(W)**; Malaysia; Northern Mariana Islands; Pakistan **(W)**; Palestine; Singapore |

Notes

- Teams in **bold** qualified for the final tournament.
- (H): Qualification group hosts (remaining group hosted at neutral venue)
- (Q): Automatically qualified for final tournament regardless of qualification results
- (W): Withdrew after draw

Did not enter

- Afghanistan
- Bahrain
- Bhutan
- Brunei
- Cambodia
- Indonesia
- Kuwait (suspended)
- Macau
- Maldives
- Mongolia
- Nepal
- Oman
- Qatar
- Saudi Arabia
- Sri Lanka
- Syria
- Tajikistan
- Timor-Leste
- Turkmenistan
- Yemen

== Player eligibility ==
Players born between 1 January 2001 and 31 December 2003 were eligible to compete in the 2017 AFC U-16 Women's Championship.

== Format ==
In each group, teams played each other once at a centralised venue. The four group winners qualified for the final tournament. If Thailand won their group, the runner-up of their group also qualified for the final tournament.

=== Tiebreakers ===
Teams were ranked according to points (3 points for a win, 1 point for a draw, 0 points for a loss), and if tied on points, the following tiebreaking criteria were applied, in the order given, to determine the rankings (Regulations Article 11.5):

1. Points in head-to-head matches among tied teams;
2. Goal difference in head-to-head matches among tied teams;
3. Goals scored in head-to-head matches among tied teams;
4. If more than two teams are tied, and after applying all head-to-head criteria above, a subset of teams are still tied, all head-to-head criteria above are reapplied exclusively to this subset of teams;
5. Goal difference in all group matches;
6. Goals scored in all group matches;
7. Penalty shoot-out if only two teams are tied and they met in the last round of the group;
8. Disciplinary points (yellow card = 1 point, red card as a result of two yellow cards = 3 points, direct red card = 3 points, yellow card followed by direct red card = 4 points);
9. Drawing of lots.

== Groups ==
The matches were scheduled for 25 August – 5 September 2016.

=== Group A ===
- All matches were held in Thailand.
- Times listed were UTC+7.

| Pos | Team | Pld | W | D | L | GF | GA | GD | Pts | Qualification |
|---|---|---|---|---|---|---|---|---|---|---|
| 1 | Thailand (H) | 4 | 4 | 0 | 0 | 13 | 3 | +10 | 12 | Final tournament as one of the top 4 teams at 2015 season |
| 2 | Laos | 4 | 3 | 0 | 1 | 23 | 8 | +15 | 9 | 2017 AFC U-16 Women's Championship |
| 3 | Myanmar | 4 | 2 | 0 | 2 | 17 | 9 | +8 | 6 | |
| 4 | Jordan | 4 | 1 | 0 | 3 | 7 | 9 | −2 | 3 | |
| 5 | Guam | 4 | 0 | 0 | 4 | 2 | 33 | −31 | 0 | |
| 6 | Pakistan | 0 | 0 | 0 | 0 | 0 | 0 | 0 | 0 | Withdrew |

Source: AFC
Rules for classification: Qualification tiebreakers
(H) Hosts
27 August 2016
16:00

| Myanmar | 2–5 | Laos |
|---|---|---|
| San Thaw Thaw 11', 41' | Report | Homsombath 4'; Phatdala 20', 90+5'; Chanhthavongxay 43'; Seepasong 56' |

Chonburi Stadium, Chonburi
Attendance: 200
Referee: Anna Sidorova (Uzbekistan)
27 August 2016
19:00

| Jordan | 1–2 | Thailand |
|---|---|---|
| Al Maiah 73' | Report | Penpitcha 21'; Nutnicha 34' (pen.) |

Chonburi Stadium, Chonburi
Attendance: 560
Referee: Park Ji-yeong (South Korea)

29 August 2016
16:00

| Myanmar | 11–0 | Guam |
|---|---|---|
| San Thaw Thaw 3', 27', 31', 40', 45+1', 55', 70', 89'; Thidar Win 24'; Eisenhardt 54' (o.g.); May Htet Lu 90+3' | Report |

Chonburi Stadium, Chonburi
Attendance: 50
Referee: Yoshimi Yamashita (Japan)
29 August 2016
19:00

| Thailand | 5–2 | Laos |
|---|---|---|
| Supawadee 37'; Kotchaphon 45+2', 53', 54', 72' | Report | Phatdala 68'; Inthiya 73' |

Chonburi Stadium, Chonburi
Attendance: 536
Referee: Saltanat Noroozi (Iran)

31 August 2016
16:00

| Laos | 2–0 | Jordan |
|---|---|---|
| Chanthala 8'; Boling 54' | Report |

Chonburi Stadium, Chonburi
Attendance: 110
Referee: Park Ji-yeong (South Korea)
31 August 2016
19:00

| Thailand | 4–0 | Guam |
|---|---|---|
| Ploychompoo 23', 45+1'; Phattharanit 40'; Phonchita 73' | Report |

Chonburi Stadium, Chonburi
Attendance: 326
Referee: Anna Sidorova (Uzbekistan)

3 September 2016
16:00

| Guam | 1–14 | Laos |
|---|---|---|
| Han 55' | Report | Inthiya 5', 42', 90+5'; Kenney 8' (o.g.); Chanhthavongxay 25', 46'; Phatdala 30', 48', 52', 78', 83'; Homsombath 63'; Inthavong 75'; Chanthithong 90+3' |

Chonburi Stadium, Chonburi
Attendance: 30
Referee: Saltanat Noroozi (Iran)
3 September 2016
19:00

| Myanmar | 4–2 | Jordan |
|---|---|---|
| Win Sanda Tun 16', 34'; Kyi Pyar Lin 56'; San Thaw Thaw 59' | Report | Allababdeh 17'; Al Maiah 70' |

Chonburi Stadium, Chonburi
Attendance: 185
Referee: Yoshimi Yamashita (Japan)

5 September 2016
16:00

| Jordan | 4–1 | Guam |
|---|---|---|
| Al Maiah 27', 35', 45', 79' | Report | Cruz 90+5' |

Chonburi Stadium, Chonburi
Attendance: 150
Referee: Park Ji-yeong (South Korea)
5 September 2016
19:00

| Thailand | 2–0 | Myanmar |
|---|---|---|
| Chatchawan 25'; Kotchaphon 56' | Report |

Chonburi Stadium, Chonburi
Attendance: 715
Referee: Yoshimi Yamashita (Japan)

=== Group B ===
- All matches were held in China (neutral venue host).
- Times listed were UTC+8.

| Pos | Team | Pld | W | D | L | GF | GA | GD | Pts | Qualification |
|---|---|---|---|---|---|---|---|---|---|---|
| 1 | South Korea | 4 | 4 | 0 | 0 | 38 | 0 | +38 | 12 | 2017 AFC U-16 Women's Championship |
| 2 | Philippines | 4 | 3 | 0 | 1 | 20 | 7 | +13 | 9 | |
| 3 | India | 4 | 2 | 0 | 2 | 9 | 11 | −2 | 6 | |
| 4 | Malaysia | 4 | 1 | 0 | 3 | 3 | 24 | −21 | 3 | |
| 5 | Northern Mariana Islands | 4 | 0 | 0 | 4 | 2 | 30 | −28 | 0 | |
| 6 | Lebanon | 0 | 0 | 0 | 0 | 0 | 0 | 0 | 0 | Withdrew |

Source: AFC
Rules for classification: Qualification tiebreakers
28 August 2016
11:00

| Philippines | 2–0 | India |
|---|---|---|
| Isulat 6'; Tiongson 75' | Report |

Luneng Football School, Weifang
Attendance: 88
Referee: Casey Reibelt (Australia)
28 August 2016
16:00

| Northern Mariana Islands | 1–2 | Malaysia |
|---|---|---|
| Sally 22' | Report | Athirah 64'; Nurfaizah 71' |

Luneng Football School, Weifang
Attendance: 30
Referee: Shiva Yari (Iran)

30 August 2016
11:00

| Malaysia | 0–13 | South Korea |
|---|---|---|
| | Report | Chun Ga-ram 2', 22' (pen.), 35', 54'; Cho Mi-jin 11', 15', 51', 58', 76'; Chang Eun-hyun 20'; Hyun Seul-gi 27', 72'; Ko Min-jung 90' |

Luneng Football School, Weifang
Attendance: 20
Referee: Wang Jia (China)
30 August 2016
16:00

| Northern Mariana Islands | 0–13 | Philippines |
|---|---|---|
| | Report | Isulat 1', 13', 32', 63'; De. Graellos 2'; Levasseur 6'; Collatos 18'; Villasin 33'; Dela Cruz 43'; Da. Graellos 47'; Mahoney 54'; Arthur 80'; Rebosura 84' |

Luneng Football School, Weifang
Attendance: 28
Referee: Kajiyama Fusako (Japan)

1 September 2016
11:00

| South Korea | 11–0 | Northern Mariana Islands |
|---|---|---|
| Jang You-been 7', 35', 38', 56', 81' (pen.); Kim Bo-min 10', 23', 25'; Cho Mi-jin 84', 90+2'; Hyun Seul-gi 85' | Report |

Luneng Football School, Weifang
Attendance: 29
Referee: Shiva Yari (Iran)
1 September 2016
16:00

| India | 5–1 | Malaysia |
|---|---|---|
| Guguloth 4'; Rani 48', 53', 72'; Yumlembam 88' | Report | Nurfaizah 11' |

Luneng Football School, Weifang
Attendance: 50
Referee: Kajiyama Fusako (Japan)

3 September 2016
11:00

| India | 4–1 | Northern Mariana Islands |
|---|---|---|
| Guguloth 16', 67'; Rani 24'; Rai 90+2' (pen.) | Report | Borja 34' |

Luneng Football School, Weifang
Attendance: 20
Referee: Shiva Yari (Iran)
3 September 2016
16:00

| Philippines | 0–7 | South Korea |
|---|---|---|
| | Report | Hyun Seul-gi 11', 39'; Kim Hye-jeong 22' (pen.); Cho Mi-jin 45'; Noh Heon-yeon 75', 89'; Jang You-been 90+2' |

Luneng Football School, Weifang
Attendance: 26
Referee: Wang Jia (China)

5 September 2016
11:00

| Malaysia | 0–5 | Philippines |
|---|---|---|
| | Report | De. Graellos 7', 78'; Isulat 51'; Levasseur 58'; Mahoney 65' |

Luneng Football School, Weifang
Attendance: 26
Referee: Wang Jia (China)
5 September 2016
16:00

| South Korea | 7–0 | India |
|---|---|---|
| Kim Bo-min 14', 70'; Jang You-been 39'; Chun Ga-ram 41', 84'; Hwang Ah-hyeon 44'; Cho Mi-jin 64' | Report |

Luneng Football School, Weifang
Attendance: 50
Referee: Kajiyama Fusako (Japan)

=== Group C ===
- All matches were held in Bangladesh.
- Times listed were UTC+6.

| Pos | Team | Pld | W | D | L | GF | GA | GD | Pts | Qualification |
|---|---|---|---|---|---|---|---|---|---|---|
| 1 | Bangladesh (H) | 5 | 5 | 0 | 0 | 26 | 2 | +24 | 15 | 2017 AFC U-16 Women's Championship |
| 2 | Chinese Taipei | 5 | 4 | 0 | 1 | 29 | 8 | +21 | 12 | |
| 3 | Iran | 5 | 3 | 0 | 2 | 28 | 9 | +19 | 9 | |
| 4 | United Arab Emirates | 5 | 1 | 1 | 3 | 5 | 18 | −13 | 4 | |
| 5 | Kyrgyzstan | 5 | 1 | 0 | 4 | 5 | 30 | −25 | 3 | |
| 6 | Singapore | 5 | 0 | 1 | 4 | 3 | 29 | −26 | 1 | |

Source: AFC
Rules for classification: Qualification tiebreakers
(H) Hosts
27 August 2016
11:00

| Chinese Taipei | 7–1 | Kyrgyzstan |
|---|---|---|
| Su Yu-hsuan 12', 23' (pen.); Nien Ching-yun 26'; Jheng Ya-zih 28', 81'; He Xin-rou 44'; Yu Ya-xuan 90' | Report | Erkinbaeva 3' |

Bangabandhu National Stadium, Dhaka
Attendance: 50
Referee: Oh Hyeon-jeong (South Korea)
27 August 2016
15:00

| United Arab Emirates | 2–2 | Singapore |
|---|---|---|
| Mohamed 32'; Sameeh 45+5' | Report | Chu 45+2'; Putri 47' |

Bangabandhu National Stadium, Dhaka
Attendance: 100
Referee: Edita Mirabidova (Uzbekistan)
27 August 2016
18:00

| Bangladesh | 3–0 | Iran |
|---|---|---|
| Akter 63'; Moushumi 66'; T. Khatun 86' | Report |

Bangabandhu National Stadium, Dhaka
Attendance: 500
Referee: Cong Thi Dung (Vietnam)

29 August 2016
11:00

| Iran | 9–0 | Kyrgyzstan |
|---|---|---|
| Ghasemi 18', 54', 71', 80', 87'; Torkaman 26'; Makhdoumi 42', 85'; Nasab 45+2' | Report |

Bangabandhu National Stadium, Dhaka
Attendance: 50
Referee: Law Bik Chi (Hong Kong)
29 August 2016
15:00

| Chinese Taipei | 5–0 | United Arab Emirates |
|---|---|---|
| Tseng Yun-ya 18'; Wu Yu-jou 48'; Jheng Ya-zih 57'; Yu Ya-xuan 77', 90+1' | Report |

Bangabandhu National Stadium, Dhaka
Attendance: 30
Referee: Oh Hyeon-jeong (South Korea)
29 August 2016
18:00

| Bangladesh | 5–0 | Singapore |
|---|---|---|
| Sarkar 39', 47'; Anu. Mogini 83', 90+1'; Moushumi 86' | Report |

Bangabandhu National Stadium, Dhaka
Attendance: 1,800
Referee: Cong Thi Dung (Vietnam)

31 August 2016
11:00

| Singapore | 0–9 | Chinese Taipei |
|---|---|---|
| | Report | Su Yu-hsuan 3', 83', 88'; Jheng Ya-zih 11', 90+1'; Wu Dai-ling 13'; Nien Ching-yun 33', 74'; Wu Yu-jou 51' |

Bangabandhu National Stadium, Dhaka
Attendance: 40
Referee: Law Bik-chi (Hong Kong)
31 August 2016
15:00

| Iran | 5–0 | United Arab Emirates |
|---|---|---|
| Ghasemi 23', 37', 83'; Nasab 25'; Feizi 90+3' | Report |

Bangabandhu National Stadium, Dhaka
Attendance: 150
Referee: Oh Hyeon-jeong (South Korea)
31 August 2016
18:00

| Kyrgyzstan | 0–10 | Bangladesh |
|---|---|---|
| | Report | Anu. Mogini 21', 45+2'; Akter 30'; Sarkar 44', 48', 80'; Shamsunnahar 68' (pen.), 85'; N. Khatun 75'; Manda 84' |

Bangabandhu National Stadium, Dhaka
Attendance: 1,500
Referee: Edita Mirabidova (Uzbekistan)

3 September 2016
11:00

| Singapore | 0–11 | Iran |
|---|---|---|
| | Report | Ghasemi 11', 13'; Mohammadi 15'; Nasab 22', 39'; Makhdoumi 23', 69', 71', 84'; Khodaparasti 79'; Daeinia 85' |

Bangabandhu National Stadium, Dhaka
Attendance: 50
Referee: Edita Mirabidova (Uzbekistan)
3 September 2016
15:00

| United Arab Emirates | 3–2 | Kyrgyzstan |
|---|---|---|
| Al Baloshi 13'; Alhammadi 41'; Sameeh 63' | Report | Ibraimova 38'; Dalinger 51' |

Bangabandhu National Stadium, Dhaka
Attendance: 100
Referee: Cong Thi Dung (Vietnam)
3 September 2016
18:00

| Chinese Taipei | 2–4 | Bangladesh |
|---|---|---|
| Su Yu-hsuan 11'; Wu Yu-jou 88' | Report | Shamsunnahar 28' (pen.), 39' (pen.); Sarkar 56'; Akter 79' |

Bangabandhu National Stadium, Dhaka
Attendance: 7,000
Referee: Law Bik Chi (Hong Kong)

5 September 2016
11:00

| Bangladesh | 4–0 | United Arab Emirates |
|---|---|---|
| Krishna 3', 52'; Anuching 57'; Tohura 87' | Report |

Bangabandhu National Stadium, Dhaka
Attendance: 1,000
Referee: Edita Mirabidova (Uzbekistan)
5 September 2016
15:00

| Iran | 3–6 | Chinese Taipei |
|---|---|---|
| Nasab 50', 71'; Etemad 90+2' | Report | Jheng Ya-zih 10'; Tseng Yun-ya 19'; Nien Ching-yun 31', 90+1'; Su Yu-hsuan 63'; Lin Hsin-hui 89' |

Bangabandhu National Stadium, Dhaka
Attendance: 50
Referee: Cong Thi Dung (Vietnam)
5 September 2016
18:00

| Kyrgyzstan | 2–1 | Singapore |
|---|---|---|
| Dalinger 8'; Sultanova 17' | Report | Ong 76' |

Bangabandhu National Stadium, Dhaka
Attendance: 120
Referee: Oh Hyeon-jeong (South Korea)

=== Group D ===
- All matches were held in Vietnam.
- Times listed were UTC+7.

| Pos | Team | Pld | W | D | L | GF | GA | GD | Pts | Qualification |
|---|---|---|---|---|---|---|---|---|---|---|
| 1 | Australia | 5 | 5 | 0 | 0 | 65 | 1 | +64 | 15 | 2017 AFC U-16 Women's Championship |
| 2 | Vietnam (H) | 5 | 4 | 0 | 1 | 19 | 7 | +12 | 12 | |
| 3 | Uzbekistan | 5 | 2 | 1 | 2 | 9 | 12 | −3 | 7 | |
| 4 | Hong Kong | 5 | 1 | 1 | 3 | 4 | 24 | −20 | 4 | |
| 5 | Iraq | 5 | 1 | 0 | 4 | 2 | 17 | −15 | 3 | |
| 6 | Palestine | 5 | 0 | 2 | 3 | 3 | 41 | −38 | 2 | |

Source: AFC
Rules for classification: Qualification tiebreakers
(H) Hosts
25 August 2016
13:00

| Australia | 28–0 | Palestine |
|---|---|---|
| Nevin 1', 7', 12', 20', 27', 27', 32', 32', 34'; Cooney-Cross 4', 72', 83', 89'; Kubin 11', 30'; Sayer 37'; Roestbakken 45+3', 52'; Al Soos 47', 57' (o.g.); Dribbus 54'; Johns 55'; Sakalis 59', 61', 68', 86', 90+1'; Iannella 85' | Report |

Vietnam YFT Center Field no.3, Hanoi
Attendance: 100
Referee: Nami Imaizumi (Japan)
25 August 2016
15:00

| Hong Kong | 2–1 | Iraq |
|---|---|---|
| Tsang 11'; Chan Wing Lam 39' | Report | Ahmed 9' |

Vietnam YFT Center Field no.1, Hanoi
Attendance: 20
Referee: Thein Thein Aye (Myanmar)
25 August 2016
16:00

| Vietnam | 2–1 | Uzbekistan |
|---|---|---|
| Ngân Thị Vạn Sự 16', 45+3' | Report | Yusupova 54' |

Vietnam YFT Center Field no.3, Hanoi
Attendance: 75
Referee: Kim Sook-hee (South Korea)

27 August 2016
15:00

| Uzbekistan | 1–1 | Palestine |
|---|---|---|
| Rashidova 90' (pen.) | Report | Al Shaikh 80' |

Vietnam YFT Center Field no.1, Hanoi
Attendance: 80
Referee: Kim Sook-hee (South Korea)
27 August 2016
15:30

| Australia | 14–0 | Hong Kong |
|---|---|---|
| Vignes 3', 47'; Galabadaarachchi 6', 36', 83'; Sayer 18', 32'; Kubin 24', 45+2', 49', 64'; Meads 53'; Kell 77'; Hughes 81' | Report |

Vietnam YFT Center Field no.3, Hanoi
Attendance: 67
Referee: Thein Thein Aye (Myanmar)
27 August 2016
18:30

| Vietnam | 3–0 | Iraq |
|---|---|---|
| Fadhil 3' (o.g.); Ngân Thị Vạn Sự 26'; Trần Thị Mỹ Thương 72' | Report |

Vietnam YFT Center Field no.3, Hanoi
Attendance: 140
Referee: Nami Imaizumi (Japan)

29 August 2016
15:00

| Iraq | 0–8 | Australia |
|---|---|---|
| | Report | Sakalis 10', 30', 42'; Dribbus 36'; Roestbakken 44'; Galabadaarachchi 49'; Arens 67'; Cooney-Cross 80' |

Vietnam YFT Center Field no.1, Hanoi
Attendance: 70
Referee: Nami Imaizumi (Japan)
29 August 2016
15:30

| Uzbekistan | 2–0 | Hong Kong |
|---|---|---|
| Rashidova 52'; Erkinova 77' | Report |

Vietnam YFT Center Field no.3, Hanoi
Attendance: 20
Referee: Kim Sook-hee (South Korea)
29 August 2016
18:30

| Palestine | 0–9 | Vietnam |
|---|---|---|
| | Report | Ngân Thị Vạn Sự 11'; Trần Thị Mỹ Thương 16'; Phan Thị Thu Thìn 19'; Lê Thị Kim Lảnh 22', 58'; Trần Thị Thu Xuân 28'; Nguyễn Thị Thanh Nhã 53', 83'; Nguyễn Thị Tú Anh 81' |

Vietnam YFT Center Field no.3, Hanoi
Attendance: 65
Referee: Thein Thein Aye (Myanmar)

1 September 2016
15:00

| Hong Kong | 2–2 | Palestine |
|---|---|---|
| Chan Wing Lam 33'; Kwan Wing Yu 65' | Report | Sarawi 24'; Khalil 80' |

Vietnam YFT Center Field no.1, Hanoi
Attendance: 50
Referee: Thein Thein Aye (Myanmar)
1 September 2016
15:30

| Iraq | 0–4 | Uzbekistan |
|---|---|---|
| | Report | Yusupova 6', 72'; Farmonova 47'; Rashidova 57' |

Vietnam YFT Center Field no.3, Hanoi
Attendance: 45
Referee: Nami Imaizumi (Japan)
1 September 2016
18:30

| Australia | 6–0 | Vietnam |
|---|---|---|
| Kubin 4', 13'; Cooney-Cross 57'; Vignes 79'; Nevin 86'; Rose 88' | Report |

Vietnam YFT Center Field no.3, Hanoi
Attendance: 450
Referee: Kim Sook-hee (South Korea)

3 September 2016
15:00

| Uzbekistan | 1–9 | Australia |
|---|---|---|
| Turaeva 85' | Report | Sakalis 23' (pen.), 38', 69'; Galabadaarachchi 26', 31'; Hristodoulou 45'; Khikmatova 75' (o.g.); Vignes 78'; Roestbakken 90+2' |

Vietnam YFT Center Field no.1, Hanoi
Attendance: 40
Referee: Thein Thein Aye (Myanmar)
3 September 2016
15:30

| Palestine | 0–1 | Iraq |
|---|---|---|
| | Report | Sabah 76' |

Vietnam YFT Center Field no.3, Hanoi
Attendance: 30
Referee: Kim Sook-hee (South Korea)
3 September 2016
18:30

| Vietnam | 5–0 | Hong Kong |
|---|---|---|
| Trần Thị Hải Linh 35'; Nguyễn Thị Hằng 53'; Phan Thị Thu Thìn 66'; Ngân Thị Vạn Sự 72'; Trần Thị Thu Xuân 90+1' | Report |

Vietnam YFT Center Field no.3, Hanoi
Attendance: 62
Referee: Nami Imaizumi (Japan)

== Qualified teams ==
The following eight teams qualified for the final tournament.

| Team | Qualified as | Qualified on | Previous appearances in AFC U-16 Women's Championship^{1} |
|---|---|---|---|
| North Korea | 2015 champions | 19 May 2016 | 5 (**2007**, 2009, 2011, 2013, **2015**) |
| Japan | 2015 champions | 19 May 2016 | 6 (**2005**, 2007, 2009, **2011**, **2013**, 2015) |
| China | 2015 third place | 19 May 2016 | 6 (2005, 2007, 2009, 2011, 2013, 2015) |
| Thailand | 2015 fourth place | 19 May 2016 | 6 (2005, 2007, 2009, 2011, 2013, 2015) |
| Laos | Group A runners-up | 5 September 2016 | 0 (debut) |
| South Korea | Group B winners | 5 September 2016 | 6 (2005, 2007, **2009**, 2011, 2013, 2015) |
| Bangladesh | Group C winners | 3 September 2016 | 1 (2005) |
| Australia | Group D winners | 1 September 2016 | 4 (2007, 2009, 2011, 2013) |

^{1} Bold indicates champions for that year. Italic indicates hosts for that year.

== Goalscorers ==
There were 332 goals scored in 50 matches, for an average of 6.64 goals per match.

11 goals

- (Australia) Sofia Sakalis
- (Myanmar) San Thaw Thaw

10 goals

- (Australia) Courtney Nevin
- (Iran) Fatemeh Ghasemi

9 goals

- (South Korea) Cho Mi-jin

8 goals

- (Australia) India Kubin
- (Bangladesh) Krishna Rani Sarkar
- (Laos) Kemmy Phatdala

7 goals

- (Chinese Taipei) Su Yu-hsuan
- (South Korea) Jang You-been

6 goals

- (Australia) Kyra Cooney-Cross
- (Australia) Jacynta Galabadaarachchi
- (Chinese Taipei) Jheng Ya-zih
- (Iran) Fatemeh Makhdoumi
- (Iran) Roghayeh Nasab
- (Jordan) Lina Al Maiah
- (South Korea) Chun Ga-ram
- (Philippines) Terjanee Isulat

5 goals

- (Bangladesh) Anuching Mogini
- (Chinese Taipei) Nien Ching-yun
- (South Korea) Hyun Seul-gi
- (South Korea) Kim Bo-min
- (Vietnam) Ngân Thị Vạn Sự
- (Thailand) Kotchaphon Nillaor

4 goals

- (Australia) Karly Roestbakken
- (Australia) Julia Vignes
- (Bangladesh) Shamsunnahar
- (India) Renu Rani
- (Laos) Vady Inthiya

3 goals

- (Australia) Amy Sayer
- (Bangladesh) Marzia Akter
- (Chinese Taipei) Wu Yu-jou
- (Chinese Taipei) Yu Ya-xuan
- (India) Soumya Guguloth
- (Laos) Aphatsala Chanhthavongxay
- (Philippines) Denise Graellos
- (Uzbekistan) Tojinisokhon Rashidova
- (Uzbekistan) Shakhnozabonu Yusupova

2 goals

- (Australia) Ashley Dribbus
- (Bangladesh) Mishrat Jahan Moushumi
- (Bangladesh) Tohura Khatun
- (Chinese Taipei) Tseng Yun-ya
- (Hong Kong) Chan Wing Lam
- (Kyrgyzstan) Viktoriia Dalinger
- (Laos) Thipphaphone Homsombath
- (Malaysia) Nurfaizah Saidin
- (Myanmar) Win Sanda Tun
- (Philippines) Caitlin Levasseur
- (Philippines) Isabella Mahoney
- (South Korea) Noh Heon-yeon
- (Thailand) Ploychompoo Somnuek
- (United Arab Emirates) Sara Sameeh
- (Vietnam) Lê Thị Kim Lảnh
- (Vietnam) Nguyễn Thị Thanh Nhã
- (Vietnam) Phan Thị Thu Thìn
- (Vietnam) Trần Thị Mỹ Thương
- (Vietnam) Trần Thị Thu Xuân

1 goal

- (Australia) Molly Arens
- (Australia) Angelique Hristodoulou
- (Australia) Laura Hughes
- (Australia) Georgia Iannella
- (Australia) Gracie Johns
- (Australia) Lucy Kell
- (Australia) Jess Meads
- (Australia) Alyssa Rose
- (Bangladesh) Maria Manda
- (Bangladesh) Nargis Khatun
- (Chinese Taipei) He Xin-rou
- (Chinese Taipei) Lin Hsin-hui
- (Chinese Taipei) Wu Dai-ling
- (Guam) Hannah Cruz
- (Guam) Jenna Han
- (Hong Kong) Kwan Wing Yu
- (Hong Kong) Halasan Tsang
- (India) Karishma Rai
- (India) Thailand Yumlembam
- (Iran) Fatemeh Daeinia
- (Iran) Mobina Etemad
- (Iran) Marzieh Feizi
- (Iran) Hanieh Khodaparasti
- (Iran) Maryam Mohammadi
- (Iran) Maral Torkaman
- (Iraq) Lanja Ahmed
- (Iraq) Elaf Sabah
- (Jordan) Amal Allababdeh
- (Kyrgyzstan) Adelia Erkinbaeva
- (Kyrgyzstan) Shakhnoza Ibraimova
- (Kyrgyzstan) Setora Sultanova
- (Laos) Boling
- (Laos) Daoheung Chanthala
- (Laos) Anouta Chanthithong
- (Laos) Bouasavanh Inthavong
- (Laos) Noudaeng Seepasong
- (Malaysia) Nor Athirah
- (Myanmar) Kyi Pyar Lin
- (Myanmar) May Htet Lu
- (Myanmar) Thidar Win
- (Northern Mariana Islands) Guinevere Borja
- (Northern Mariana Islands) Lyka Sally
- (Palestine) Laila Al Shaikh
- (Palestine) Joudi Khalil
- (Palestine) Hala Sarawi
- (Philippines) Stacey Arthur
- (Philippines) Maeva Collatos
- (Philippines) Glynnes Dela Cruz
- (Philippines) Danezza Graellos
- (Philippines) Regine Rebosura
- (Philippines) Andrea Tiongson
- (Philippines) Hannah Villasin
- (Singapore) Dorcas Chu
- (Singapore) Valerie Ong Siu Kym
- (Singapore) Putri Nur Syaliza
- (South Korea) Chang Eun-hyun
- (South Korea) Hwang Ah-hyeon
- (South Korea) Kim Hye-jeong
- (South Korea) Ko Min-jung
- (Thailand) Chatchawan Rodthong
- (Thailand) Nutnicha Kalasin
- (Thailand) Penpitcha Chaisida
- (Thailand) Phattharanit Duangkaew
- (Thailand) Phonchita Thaenprathum
- (Thailand) Supawadee Keereewong
- (United Arab Emirates) Al Reem Al Baloshi
- (United Arab Emirates) Rawan Alhammadi
- (United Arab Emirates) Hassa Mohamed
- (Uzbekistan) Diyora Erkinova
- (Uzbekistan) Anora Farmonova
- (Uzbekistan) Marjona Turaeva
- (Vietnam) Nguyễn Thị Hằng
- (Vietnam) Nguyễn Thị Tú Anh
- (Vietnam) Trần Thị Hải Linh

1 own goal

- (Guam) Sina Eisenhardt (against Myanmar)
- (Guam) Sabrina Kenney (against Laos)
- (Iraq) Fatimah Fadhil (against Vietnam)
- (Uzbekistan) Madina Khikmatova (against Australia)

2 own goals

- (Palestine) Nicol Al Soos (against Australia)
