= 2017 AFC U-16 Women's Championship =

ฟุตบอลหญิงชิงชนะเลิศแห่งเอเชีย รุ่นอายุไม่เกิน 16 ปี 2017

Tournament details
- Host country: Thailand
- Dates: 10–23 September
- Teams: 8 (from 1 confederation)
- Venues: 2 (in 1 host city)

Final positions
- Champions: North Korea (3rd title)
- Runners-up: South Korea
- Third place: Japan
- Fourth place: China

Tournament statistics
- Matches played: 16
- Goals scored: 69 (4.31 per match)
- Attendance: 6,276 (392 per match)
- Top scorer: (North Korea) Kim Kyong-yong (9 goals)
- Best player: (North Korea) Kim Kyong-yong
- Fair play award: Japan

The 2017 AFC U-16 Women's Championship was the 7th edition of the AFC U-16 Women's Championship, the biennial international youth football championship organised by the Asian Football Confederation (AFC) for the women's under-16 national teams of Asia. The tournament was held in Thailand between 10 and 23 September 2017, with a total of eight teams competing.

The top three teams of the tournament qualified for the 2018 FIFA U-17 Women's World Cup in Uruguay as the AFC representatives.

== Qualification ==
The draw for the qualifiers was held on 19 May 2016. Four teams qualified directly for the final tournament by their 2015 performance, while the other entrants competed in the qualifying stage for the remaining four spots (Thailand also participated in qualifying despite already qualified as hosts). The qualifiers were held from 25 August to 5 September 2016.

=== Qualified teams ===
The following eight teams qualified for the final tournament.

Team	Qualified as	Appearance	Previous best performance
North Korea	2015 champions	6th	Champions (2007, 2015)
Japan	2015 runners-up	7th	Champions (2005, 2011, 2013)
China	2015 third place	7th	Runners-up (2005)
Thailand	2015 fourth place / Hosts	7th	Third place (2005)
Laos	Group A runners-up (Note: Since the Group A winners Thailand already automatically qualified for the final tournament as hosts, Laos also qualified for the final tournament as runners-up.)	1st	Debut
South Korea	Group B winners	7th	Champions (2009)
Bangladesh	Group C winners	2nd	Group stage (2005)
Australia	Group D winners	5th	Fourth place (2009)

== Venues ==
The tournament was held in Chonburi, Chonburi Province, at the Chonburi Stadium and the IPE Chonburi Stadium.

Chonburi
Chonburi Stadium	IPE Chonburi Stadium
Capacity: 8,680	Capacity: 11,000
2017 AFC U-16 Women's Championship is located in Thailand

== Draw ==
The draw was held on 28 April 2017, 15:00 MYT (UTC+8), at the AFC House in Kuala Lumpur, Malaysia. The eight teams were drawn into two groups of four teams. The teams were seeded according to their performance in the 2015 AFC U-16 Women's Championship final tournament and qualification, with the hosts Thailand automatically seeded and assigned to Position A1 in the draw.

Pot 1	Pot 2	Pot 3	Pot 4
1. Thailand (hosts); 2. North Korea	3. Japan; 4. China	5. South Korea; 6. Australia	7. Bangladesh; 8. Laos

== Squads ==
Players born between 1 January 2001 and 31 December 2003 are eligible to compete in the tournament. Each team must register a squad of minimum 16 players and maximum 23 players, minimum two of whom must be goalkeepers (Regulations Articles 29.4 and 29.5).

== Group stage ==
The top two teams of each group advance to the semi-finals.

Tiebreakers

Teams are ranked according to points (3 points for a win, 1 point for a draw, 0 points for a loss), and if tied on points, the following tiebreaking criteria are applied, in the order given, to determine the rankings (Regulations Article 11.5):

1. Points in head-to-head matches among tied teams;
2. Goal difference in head-to-head matches among tied teams;
3. Goals scored in head-to-head matches among tied teams;
4. If more than two teams are tied, and after applying all head-to-head criteria above, a subset of teams are still tied, all head-to-head criteria above are reapplied exclusively to this subset of teams;
5. Goal difference in all group matches;
6. Goals scored in all group matches;
7. Penalty shoot-out if only two teams are tied and they met in the last round of the group;
8. Disciplinary points (yellow card = 1 point, red card as a result of two yellow cards = 3 points, direct red card = 3 points, yellow card followed by direct red card = 4 points);
9. Drawing of lots.

All times are local, ICT (UTC+7).

=== Group A ===
Pos	Team	Pld	W	D	L	GF	GA	GD	Pts	Qualification
1	China	3	2	1	0	15	3	+12	7	Knockout stage
2	South Korea	3	2	1	0	12	2	+10	7	Knockout stage
3	Thailand (H)	3	1	0	2	4	9	−5	3	
4	Laos	3	0	0	3	0	17	−17	0	

Source: AFC
Rules for classification: Group stage tiebreakers
(H) Hosts
10 September 2017
17:00

China	2–2	South Korea
Zhang Linyan 11'; Tang Han 90+3'	Report	Hwang Ah-hyeon 59'; Kim Bit-na 68'

IPE Chonburi Stadium, Chonburi
Attendance: 95
Referee: Fusako Kajiyama (Japan)
10 September 2017
19:00

Thailand	3–0	Laos
Pluemjai 26', 67'; Panittha 45'	Report

Chonburi Stadium, Chonburi
Attendance: 185
Referee: Casey Reibelt (Australia)

13 September 2017
17:00

Laos	0–7	China
	Report	Han Huimin 3'; Li Yinghua 30'; Jin Jing 45+1'; Tang Han 57'; Zhang Linyan 62', 78'; Wang Yumeng 89'

IPE Chonburi Stadium, Chonburi
Attendance: 65
Referee: Seinn Cho Aung (Myanmar)
13 September 2017
19:00

South Korea	3–0	Thailand
An Se-bin 58'; Chang Eun-hyun 62'; Cho Mi-jin 88'	Report

Chonburi Stadium, Chonburi
Attendance: 248
Referee: Edita Mirabidova (Uzbekistan)

16 September 2017
18:00

Thailand	1–6	China
Ploychompoo 49'	Report	Ou Yiyao 6'; Wararat 30' (o.g.); Yang Qian 36'; Tang Han 56', 69'; Zhang Linyan 57'

Chonburi Stadium, Chonburi
Attendance: 250
Referee: Fusako Kajiyama (Japan)
16 September 2017
18:00

South Korea	7–0	Laos
Ko Min-jung 7', 37', 85'; Cho Mi-jin 30', 88', 89'; Lee Su-in 80'	Report

IPE Chonburi Stadium, Chonburi
Attendance: 45
Referee: Casey Reibelt (Australia)

=== Group B ===
Pos	Team	Pld	W	D	L	GF	GA	GD	Pts	Qualification
1	Japan	3	3	0	0	10	1	+9	9	Knockout stage
2	North Korea	3	2	0	1	17	2	+15	6	Knockout stage
3	Australia	3	1	0	2	3	14	−11	3	
4	Bangladesh	3	0	0	3	2	15	−13	0	

Source: AFC
Rules for classification: Group stage tiebreakers
11 September 2017
17:00

North Korea	9–0	Bangladesh
Kim Kyong-yong 5', 8', 50', 57', 86'; Ri Su-gyong 30', 90+1'; Kim Yun-ok 33'; Yun Ji-hwa 52'	Report

Chonburi Stadium, Chonburi
Attendance: 50
Referee: Pansa Chaisanit (Thailand)
11 September 2017
19:00

Japan	5–0	Australia
Osawa 5'; Tomioka 48'; Tanaka 54', 71'; Kinoshita 84'	Report

IPE Chonburi Stadium, Chonburi
Attendance: 152
Referee: Oh Hyeon-jeong (South Korea)

14 September 2017
17:00

Bangladesh	0–3	Japan
	Report	Tanaka 13'; Nakae 31'; Yamamoto 39'

IPE Chonburi Stadium, Chonburi
Attendance: 106
Referee: Mahsa Ghorbani (Iran)
14 September 2017
19:00

Australia	0–7	North Korea
	Report	Kim Kyong-yong 5', 39'; Pak Hye-gyong 21'; Ko Kyong-hui 78'; Ri Su-gyong 86', 90+2'; Yun Ji-hwa 88'

Chonburi Stadium, Chonburi
Attendance: 75
Referee: Cong Thi Dung (Vietnam)

17 September 2017
18:00

North Korea	1–2	Japan
Kim Kyong-yong 18'	Report	Kinoshita 76'; Yamamoto 86'

Chonburi Stadium, Chonburi
Attendance: 105
Referee: Edita Mirabidova (Uzbekistan)
17 September 2017
18:00

Australia	3–2	Bangladesh
Hughes 9'; Cooney-Cross 78'; Sakalis 83'	Report	Shamsunnahar 45' (pen.); Chakma 51'

IPE Chonburi Stadium, Chonburi
Attendance: 157
Referee: Oh Hyeon-jeong (South Korea)

== Knockout stage ==
In the knockout stage, penalty shoot-out (no extra time) is used to decide the winner if necessary.

=== Bracket ===
Semi-finals
20 September – Chonburi Stadium
China	0
North Korea	1
20 September – Chonburi Stadium
Japan	1 (2)
South Korea (p)	1 (4)

Final
23 September – Chonburi Stadium
North Korea	2
South Korea	0
Third place
23 September – Chonburi Stadium
China	0
Japan	1

=== Semi-finals ===
Winners qualified for 2018 FIFA U-17 Women's World Cup.

20 September 2017
16:00

China	0–1	North Korea
	Report	Ri Su-gyong 58' (pen.)

Chonburi Stadium, Chonburi
Attendance: 1,036
Referee: Cong Thi Dung (Vietnam)

20 September 2017
19:30

Japan	1–1	South Korea
Tanaka 46'	Report	Cho Mi-jin 65' (pen.)
Penalties
Tomioka (penalty scored); Tanaka (penalty missed); Ito (penalty scored); Iwai (penalty missed)	2–4	(penalty scored) Lee Su-in; (penalty missed) Lee Eun-young; (penalty scored) Jang You-been; (penalty scored) Ko Min-jung; (penalty scored) Cho Mi-jin

Chonburi Stadium, Chonburi
Attendance: 927
Referee: Mahsa Ghorbani (Iran)

=== Third place match ===
Winner qualified for 2018 FIFA U-17 Women's World Cup.

23 September 2017
16:00

China	0–1	Japan
	Report	Nakao 55'

Chonburi Stadium, Chonburi
Attendance: 1,677
Referee: Casey Reibelt (Australia)

=== Final ===
23 September 2017
19:30

North Korea	2–0	South Korea
Ri Su-jong 38'; Kim Kyong-yong 87'	Report

Chonburi Stadium, Chonburi
Attendance: 1,103
Referee: Fusako Kajiyama (Japan)

== Winners ==
Winner 2017 AFC U-16 Women's Championship

North Korea
Third title

== Awards ==
The following awards were given at the conclusion of the tournament.

Most Valuable Player	Top Scorer	Fair Play Award
(North Korea) Kim Kyong-yong	(North Korea) Kim Kyong-yong	Japan

== Goalscorers ==
9 goals

- (North Korea) Kim Kyong-yong

5 goals

- (North Korea) Ri Su-gyong
- (South Korea) Cho Mi-jin

4 goals

- (China) Tang Han
- (China) Zhang Linyan
- (Japan) Tomoko Tanaka

3 goals

- (South Korea) Ko Min-jung

2 goals

- (Japan) Momoka Kinoshita
- (Japan) Yuzuki Yamamoto
- (North Korea) Yun Ji-hwa
- (Thailand) Pluemjai Sontisawat

1 goal

- (Australia) Kyra Cooney-Cross
- (Australia) Laura Hughes
- (Australia) Sofia Sakalis
- (Bangladesh) Monika Chakma
- (Bangladesh) Shamsunnahar
- (China) Han Huimin
- (China) Jin Jing
- (China) Li Yinghua
- (China) Ou Yiyao
- (China) Wang Yumeng
- (China) Yang Qian
- (Japan) Moe Nakae
- (Japan) Momo Nakao
- (Japan) Haruka Osawa
- (Japan) Chihiro Tomioka
- (North Korea) Kim Yun-ok
- (North Korea) Ko Kyong-hui
- (North Korea) Pak Hye-gyong
- (North Korea) Ri Su-jong
- (South Korea) An Se-bin
- (South Korea) Chang Eun-hyun
- (South Korea) Hwang Ah-hyeon
- (South Korea) Kim Bit-na
- (South Korea) Lee Su-in
- (Thailand) Panittha Jeeratanapavibul
- (Thailand) Ploychompoo Somnuek

1 own goal

- (Thailand) Wararat Nanongtum (against China)

Source: the-afc.com

== Qualified teams for FIFA U-17 Women's World Cup ==
The following three teams from AFC qualified for the 2018 FIFA U-17 Women's World Cup.

Team	Qualified on	Previous appearances in FIFA U-17 Women's World Cup^{1}
North Korea	20 September 2017	5 (**2008**, 2010, 2012, 2014, **2016**)
South Korea	20 September 2017	2 (2008, **2010**)
Japan	23 September 2017	5 (2008, 2010, 2012, **2014**, 2016)

^{1} Bold indicates champions for that year. Italic indicates hosts for that year.
