= Ekkehard König =

German linguist (born 1941)

- Born: 15 January 1941; Jäschkittel, Lower Silesia (now Poland)

Academic background
- Education: University of Stuttgart
- Thesis: (1970)

Academic work
- Discipline: Linguist
- Notable students: Martin Haspelmath
- Main interests: Semantics, Linguistic typology
- Website: König @ Free University of Berlin

Ekkehard König (born 15 January 1941) is a German linguist and Professor Emeritus at the Free University of Berlin, specializing in linguistic typology, semantics, and the linguistics of English.

== Education and career ==
Ekkehard König was born in Jäschkittel in the Province of Lower Silesia (now Poland) and grew up in Bavaria. He studied general linguistics and modern languages at the University of Kiel (1960–1967), as well as the University of Newcastle (1963–1964) and the University of Edinburgh (1965–1966). He was an assistant lecturer at the University of Reading in 1967–68. He received his doctoral degree from the University of Stuttgart in 1970, and completed his habilitation qualification in 1973 at the same university, while working as an assistant professor.

König became full professor of English linguistics at the University of Hanover in 1973, and moved on to the Free University of Berlin in 1988. He retired in 2009, and has since then been affiliated with the University of Freiburg.

== Scientific contributions ==
König's main contributions are in the area of semantics, linguistic typology (especially the typology of European languages), and the contrastive linguistics of English and German.

Between 1990 and 1995, he was the director of a European Science Foundation coordination programme on the typology of the languages of Europe (EUROTYP), which brought together over a hundred linguists from many different countries of Europe. Other prominent members of this project were Simon Dik, Giuliano Bernini, Östen Dahl, Gilbert Lazard, Frans Plank, Anna Siewierska, Johan van der Auwera, Harry van der Hulst, Henk van Riemsdijk, Nigel Vincent, as well as König's junior collaborator (and doctoral student) Martin Haspelmath. The project results were published in nine volumes by De Gruyter, and one of the consequences of this coordination programme was the founding of the Association for Linguistic Typology, with its journal Linguistic Typology.

König investigated a wide range of grammatical phenomena, especially from a semantic-pragmatic, typological, and diachronic perspective. Some topics that stand out in his contributions are adjectives, focus particles, concessive and concessive conditional clauses, self-intensifiers, manner demonstratives, and definite articles.

König has coedited a large number of books, including an important handbook on linguistic typology and universals, and he served as a panel member for the European Science Foundation and the European Research Council. He is a former president of the Deutsche Gesellschaft für Sprachwissenschaft (1997–2000). He is currently one of the editors of the journal Studies in Language.

== Honours ==
- Max Planck Research Award for International Cooperation (2002)
- Member of Academia Europaea
- Corresponding member of Académie des Inscriptions et Belles-Lettres

== Selected works ==
=== Books ===
- König, Ekkehard. 1971. Adjectival constructions in English and German: A contrastive analysis. Heidelberg: Julius Gross
- König, Ekkehard. 1977. Form und Funktion: Eine funktionale Betrachtung ausgewählter Bereiche des Englischen. Tübingen: Niemeyer.
- König, E., D. Stark & S. Requardt. 1990. Adverbien und Partikeln. Ein deutsch-englisches Wörterbuch. Heidelberg: Julius Gross.
- König, Ekkehard. 1991. The meaning of focus particles: A comparative perspective. London: Routledge.
- König, Ekkehard & van der Auwera, Johan (eds.). 1994. The Germanic languages. London: Routledge.
- Haspelmath, Martin & König, Ekkehard (eds.). 1995. Converbs in cross-linguistic perspective. Berlin: Mouton de Gruyter.
- Haspelmath, Martin & König, Ekkehard & Oesterreicher, Wulf & Raible, Wolfgang. 2001. Language typology and language universals: An international handbook (Handbücher Zur Sprach- Und Kommunikationswissenschaft, Vol. 1–2.). Berlin: Mouton de Gruyter.
- König, Ekkehard & Gast, Volker. 2007. Understanding English-German contrasts. Berlin: Erich Schmidt Verlag.
- König, Ekkehard & Gast, Volker (eds.). 2008. Reciprocals and reflexives: Theoretical and typological explorations. Berlin: Mouton de Gruyter.

=== Articles ===
- König, Ekkehard & Eisenberg, Peter. 1984. Zur Pragmatik von Konzessivsätzen. In Stickel, Gerhard (ed.), Pragmatik in der Grammatik, 313–332. Düsseldorf: Schwann.
- König, Ekkehard. 1985. On the history of concessive connectives in English: Diachronic and synchronic evidence. Lingua 66(1). 1–19.
- Haspelmath, Martin & König, Ekkehard. 1998. Concessive conditionals in the languages of Europe. In Auwera, van der (ed.), Adverbial constructions in the languages of Europe (Empirical Approaches to Language Typology/EUROTYP, 20–3), 563–640. Berlin.
- König, Ekkehard & Haspelmath, Martin. 1998. Les constructions à possesseur externe dans les langues d’Europe. In Feuillet, Jack (ed.), Actance et valence dans les langues de l’Europe, 525–606. Berlin: Mouton de Gruyter.
- König, Ekkehard & Haspelmath, Martin. 1999. Der europäische Sprachbund. Eurolinguistik: Ein Schritt in die Zukunft: Beiträge zum Symposion. 111–127.
- König, Ekkehard & Siemund, Peter. 1999. Intensifiers and reflexives: A typological perspective. In Frajzyngier, Zygmunt & Curl, Traci S. (eds.), Reflexives: Forms and functions, 41–74. Amsterdam: Benjamins.
- Daniel Hole and Ekkehard König. 2002. Intensifies and Reflexivit: Eurotype vs. Asiatype. In: Kennosuke Ezawa, Wilfried Kürschner, Karl H. Rensch Manfred Ringmacher, Linguistik jenseits des Strukturalismus, 349-368. Tübingen: Gunter Narr Verlag.
- König, Ekkehard & Vezzosi, Letizia. 2004. The role of predicate meaning in the development of reflexivity. In Bisang, Walter & Himmelmann, Nikolaus & Wiemer, Björn (eds.), What makes grammaticalization?: A look from its fringes and its components, 213–244. Berlin: de Gruyter.
- König, Ekkehard & Gast, Volker. 2006. Focused assertion of identity: A typology of intensifiers. Linguistic Typology 10(2). 223–276.
- König, Ekkehard & Kokutani, Shigehiro. 2006. Towards a typology of reciprocal constructions: Focus on German and Japanese. Linguistics 44(2). 271–302.
- König, Ekkehard & Siemund, Peter. 2000. Locally free self-forms, logophoricity, and intensification in English. English Language & Linguistics 4(2). 183–204. (doi:10.1017/S1360674300000228)
- König, Ekkehard & Siemund, Peter & Töpper, Stephan. 2013. Intensifiers and reflexive pronouns. In Dryer, Matthew S. & Haspelmath, Martin (eds.), The world atlas of language structures online. Leipzig: MPI for Evolutionary Anthropology. (http://wals.info/chapter/47)
- König, Ekkehard. 2018. Definite articles and their uses. In Van Olmen, Daniël & Mortelmans, Tanja (eds.), Aspects of linguistic variation, vol. 324, 165–184. Berlin: De Gruyter Mouton. (doi:10.1515/9783110607963-006)
- König, Ekkehard & Umbach, Carla. 2018. Demonstratives of manner, of quality and of degree. In: Marco Coniglio et al. (eds) Atypical Demonstratives: Syntax, semantics and pragmatics. Berlin: De Gruyter Mouton. (doi:10.1515/9783110560299-010)
