= Kyra Cooney-Cross =

Australian soccer player (born 2002)

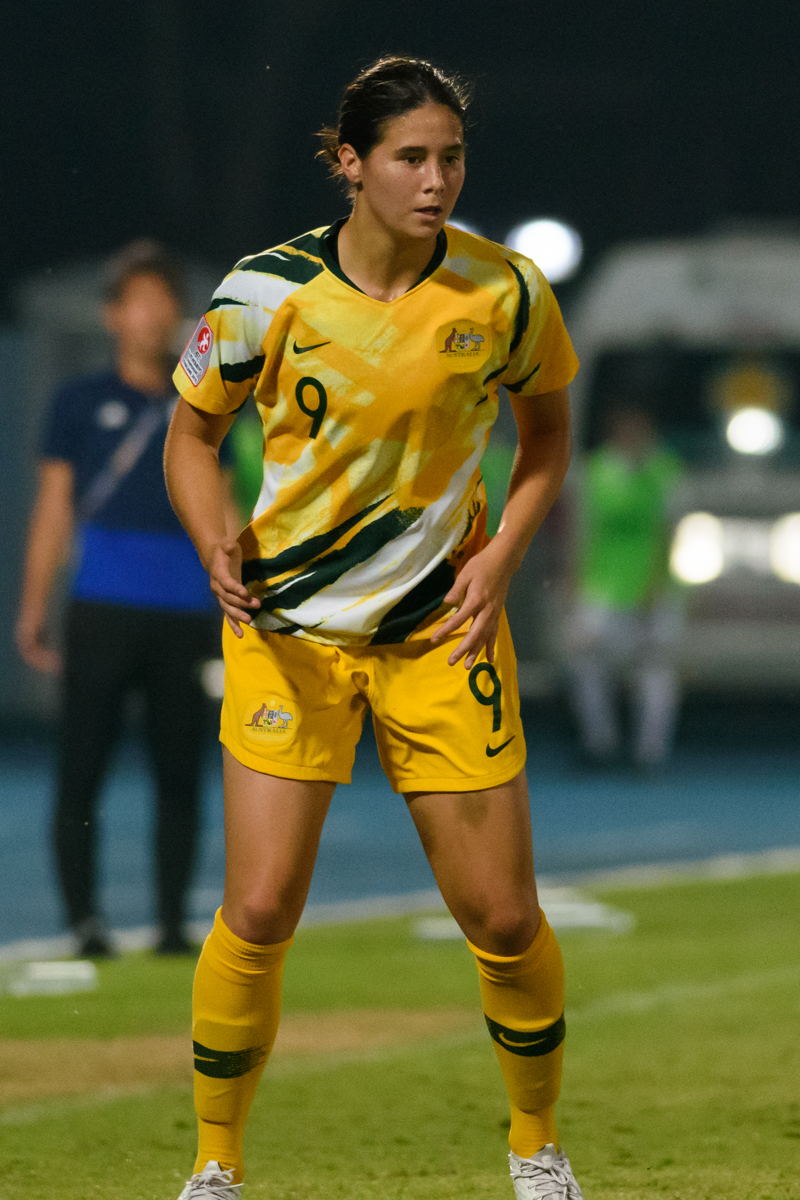
- Cooney-Cross in 2019

Personal information
- Full name: Kyra Lillee Cooney-Cross
- Date of birth: 15 February 2002 (age 24)
- Place of birth: Herston, Queensland, Australia
- Height: 1.65 m (5 ft 5 in)
- Position: Midfielder

Team information
- Current team: Arsenal
- Number: 32

Youth career
- Bli Bli United
- 2013–2016: Ballarat City

Senior career*
Years	Team	Apps	(Gls)
2016–2017	Senior NTC	30	(20)
2017–2019	Melbourne Victory	16	(2)
2019–2020	Western Sydney Wanderers	13	(4)
2020–2022	Melbourne Victory	28	(7)
2022–2023	Hammarby IF	30	(1)
2023–	Arsenal	48	(0)

International career^{‡}
2016–2017	Australia U-17	14	(14)
2018–2022	Australia U-20	8	(7)
2021–	Australia	67	(2)
- * Club domestic league appearances and goals as of 22 November 2026 ‡ National team caps and goals as of 21 March 2026

Kyra Lillee Cooney-Cross (/ˈkaɪrə/ KYE-rə; born 15 February 2002) is an Australian professional soccer player who plays as a midfielder for Women's Super League club Arsenal and the Australia national team. She has previously played for Hammarby IF in the Damallsvenskan, as well as Western Sydney Wanderers and Melbourne Victory in the W-League.

== Early life and education ==
Kyra Lillee Cooney-Cross was born on 15 February 2002 to Jessica Lee Cooney (1980–2026) and Jai Cross in Herston, Queensland, and grew up with three siblings. Their father, Cross, who works as a tiler, played soccer at semi-pro level in Queensland with Sunshine Coast and encouraged Cooney-Cross in that sport. After her parents separated, Cooney-Cross, at eight-years-old, relocated to Alice Springs with her mother and siblings, for three years before moving to Ballarat.

Usually playing with older girls and boys, at the age of 13, she started at FFV NTC (Football Federation Victoria National Training Centre) in Melbourne, and a year later trialled for the Junior Matildas. In July 2016 Cooney-Cross was a member of Victoria's Under-15 soccer team at the National Youth Championships for Girls, which won the tournament contested by seven other state/regional teams.

She later enrolled in the Future Matildas programme (for Junior Matildas) based in Sydney, New South Wales. By age 17, Cooney-Cross had attended six different schools including Ballarat High School and then to Surf Coast Secondary College, Torquay, Victoria for two years. Her mother and siblings remained in Torquay and, while in Sydney, she attended Westfields Sports High School for her final years of secondary education, alongside fellow Junior Matilda, Courtney Nevin. After living with two foster families, she moved in with the Nevin family.

== Club career ==
As a youth, Cooney-Cross spent three years with Ballarat City between 2013 and 2016, playing under their coach Tessa Curtain. She also played for an FFV NTC side, Senior NTC/FV Emerging, in the NPLW Victoria in 2016 and 2017. In the latter season she won NPLW Victoria Player's Player of the Year.

=== Melbourne Victory (2017–2019) ===
In 2017, Cooney-Cross was signed by Melbourne Victory for the 2017-18 W-League season. On 28 October 2017, she made her debut for the club in a 2–1 home win against Canberra United, playing the full 90 minutes in her first competitive league match. On 29 December 2017, she scored her maiden goal for the club in a 3–1 home loss against Newcastle Jets, heading in at the 28th minute mark behind Jets goalkeeper Britt Eckerstrom. By the end of the season she played in Victory's all twelve games, scoring two goals. Primarily playing as a forward, she was nominated for Young Player of the Year. In the 2018–19 season, she was part of the W-League premier title-winning squad, although only playing in four of twelve matches. Despite this, Cooney-Cross was unhappy: unable to improve herself as a player due to reduced game time.

=== Western Sydney Wanderers (2019–2020) ===
Cooney-Cross moved to Western Sydney Wanderers as a midfielder for the 2019–20 season, where she scored in her debut, a free-kick at the 92nd minute mark of a 2–1 home win over Adelaide United.

=== Melbourne Victory (2020–2022) ===
In December 2020, following one season at Western Sydney Wanderers, Cooney-Cross returned to Melbourne Victory. On 11 April 2021, she scored directly from a corner kick in the 120th minute of extra time to win the 2021 W-League Grand Final, beating season premiers Sydney FC 0–1.

At that year's W-League Awards she won Young Footballer of the Year.

=== Hammarby (2022–2023) ===
On 15 March 2022, Cooney-Cross and Nevin both transferred to Hammarby IF in the Swedish Damallsvenskan, signing a two-year contract. While at Hammarby, she made 30 appearances and scored one goal.

=== Arsenal (2023–) ===
On 15 September 2023, Arsenal announced signing Cooney-Cross for a transfer of AU$272,000. Ian Wright had wanted Arsenal to recruit Cooney-Cross after her impressive performance in the 2023 FIFA World Cup, and asked fellow Matilda and Arsenal player, Steph Catley to convince Cooney-Cross to join her at the club. Before accepting Arsenal, Cooney-Croos considered bids from Chelsea and Tottenham. On 1 October 2023, the opening day of the 2023-24 season, Cooney-Cross made her first appearance for Arsenal in a 0–1 loss to Liverpool. During the 2024–2025 pre-season Cooney-Cross kicked her first goal for Arsenal in a friendly 0–3 win against Southampton. The mid-fielder scored a goal for her club in the quarter-finals of the 2024–25 Women's League Cup in their 0–4 victory against Brighton & Hove Albion in January 2025.

== International career ==
In August 2016, Cooney-Cross was part of the Australia U-17s (Junior Matildas) who participated in the 2017 AFC U-16 Championship qualifiers, scoring six goals, the first four of which came against Palestine. She was later named in the squad for the 2017 AFC U-16 Championship finals, where Australia was knocked out in the group stage, their only points coming from a 3–2 win against Bangladesh. Cooney-Cross scored in the 78th minute of the game to bring the scores level to 2–2, before Sofia Sakalis scored the winner in the 83rd minute, to help Australia finish third in the group.

In October 2018, Cooney-Cross, as a member of Australia national under-20 soccer team (Young Matildas), scored the first three of her six goals of the 2019 AFC U-19 Championship qualifiers. On 4 June 2019, she was named as a standby player for the Australian senior squad (Matildas) participating in the 2019 FIFA World Cup. On 15 October 2019, she was named in the Australia U-20 squad participating in the 2019 AFC U-19 Championship. She scored Australia's first goal of the tournament in a 5–1 opening match loss against North Korea, heading in at the 16th minute mark from an Indiah-Paige Riley cross.

Cooney-Cross made her debut for the Australian national soccer team (Matildas) in a 3–2 friendly loss to Denmark on 10 June 2021. The midfielder was selected for the senior Matildas team, which qualified for the Tokyo 2020 Olympics (postponed to 2021). The team advanced to the quarter-finals with one victory and a draw in the group play. In the quarter-finals they beat Great Britain 4–3 after extra time. However, they lost 1–0 to Sweden in a semi-final and were then beaten 4–3 in the bronze medal playoff by USA.

Cooney-Cross was a part of the Australian team at the 2023 FIFA World Cup. She featured in the starting lineup of all seven matches that Australia played, forming a midfield partnership with Katrina Gorry. On 4 June 2024, Cooney-Cross was named in the Matildas team which qualified for the Paris 2024 Olympics, her second Olympic games selection. Later that year, she scored her debut goal for Australia during her 50th international game in a 1–2 win against Germany on 28 October in Duisburg, Germany. Cooney-Cross's strike won Football Australia's Goal of the Year (2024). In November 2025 that goal was one of eleven nominees for FIFA Marta Award (Goal of the Year). The midfielder kicked a similar long-shot goal in a 5–0 friendly win against New Zealand (Football Ferns) in November 2025. Football Australia awarded it Goal of the Year (2025).

== Personal life ==
Cooney-Cross was given the affectionate title of an "annoying little sister" by national team and Arsenal teammates Steph Catley and Caitlin Foord because of her cheeky personality. She is close friends with two other Matildas teammates, Charli Grant and Katrina Gorry.

In early January 2026, she returned to Australia after learning of her mother's diagnosis of cholangiocarcinoma (stage 4) – a rare, aggressive and incurable cancer of the bile duct. Cooney-Cross was unavailable for Arsenal's return to WSL duties after their mid-season break, but returned as an unused substitute in late January for their victory against AS FAR in their 2026 FIFA Champions Cup semifinal. After playing four games for the Matildas at the 2026 AFC Women's Asian Cup, held in Australia during March, Cooney-Cross remained behind to support her mother and family. Arsenal manager Renée Slegers announced that the midfielder would miss the rest of their WSL season. Jessica Cooney died of her cancer on 10 July 2026 with Cooney-Cross at her bedside.

== Career statistics ==
=== Club career ===
As of 22 November 2026

Appearances and goals by club, season and competition
Club	Season	League			National cup		League cup		Continental		Total	
Club	Season	Division	Apps	Goals	Apps	Goals	Apps	Goals	Apps	Goals	Apps	Goals
Melbourne Victory FC	2017–18	W-League	12	2	—		—		—		12	2
Melbourne Victory FC	2018–19	W-League	4	0	—		—		—		4	0
Melbourne Victory FC	Total		16	2	0	0	0	0	0	0	16	2
Western Sydney Wanderers FC	2019–20	W-League	13	4	—		—		—		13	4
Melbourne Victory FC	2020–21	W-League	14	6	—		—		—		14	6
Melbourne Victory FC	2021–22	A-League Women	14	1	—		—		—		14	1
Melbourne Victory FC	Total		28	7	0	0	0	0	0	0	28	7
Hammarby IF	2022	Damallsvenskan	12	1	—		—		—		12	1
Hammarby IF	2023	Damallsvenskan	18	0	—		5	0	—		23	0
Hammarby IF	Total		30	1	0	0	5	0	0	0	35	1
Arsenal	2023–24	Women's Super League	14	0	2	0	7	0	0	0	23	0
Arsenal	2024–25	Women's Super League	19	0	3	0	2	1	10	0	34	1
Arsenal	2025–26	Women's Super League	6	0	0	0	1	0	7	0	14	0
Arsenal	2026–27	Women's Super League	9	0	0	0	—		5	0	14	0
Arsenal	Total		48	0	5	0	10	1	22	0	85	1
Career total			135	14	5	0	15	1	22	0	177	15

=== International ===
As of match played 28 November 2025
Scores and results list Australia's goal tally first, score column indicates score after each Cooney-Cross goal.

List of international goals scored by Kyra Cooney-Cross
No.	Cap	Date	Venue	Opponent	Score	Result	Competition	Ref
1.	50	28 October 2024	Schauinsland-Reisen-Arena, Duisburg, Germany	Germany	1–1	2–1	Friendly	
2.	62	28 November 2025	polytec Stadium, Gosford, Australia	New Zealand	4–0	5–0	Friendly	

== Honours ==
Melbourne Victory

- W-League Premiers: 2018–19
- W-League Championship: 2020–21

Hammarby

- Swedish cup: 2023

Arsenal

- FA Women's League Cup: 2023–24
- UEFA Women's Champions League: 2024–25
- FIFA Women's Champions Cup: 2026

Individual

- NPLW Victoria: Player's Player of the Year (2017)
- W-League End of season awards: Young Footballer of the Year (2020–21)
- Arsenal Player of the Month: (November 2023) (January 2025)
- Football Australia's Goal of the Year (2024), (2025).
- Festival of Women's Football Awards: Young Midfielder of the Year (2025)
