= Lenore Grenoble =

American linguist

- Born: Lenore Ann Grenoble

Academic background
- Education: University of California, Berkeley
- Thesis: A contrastive analysis of verbs of motion in Russian and Polish (1986)

Academic work
- Discipline: Linguist
- Sub-discipline: Slavic languages; Arctic Indigenous languages; Endangered languages
- Institutions: University of Chicago; Dartmouth College

Lenore A. Grenoble is an American linguist specializing in Slavic and Arctic Indigenous languages. She is currently the John Matthews Manly Distinguished Service Professor and chair at University of Chicago.

== Education and research ==
Grenoble earned her Ph.D. in Slavic Linguistics at University of California, Berkeley. After receiving her PhD she took up an academic position at Dartmouth College. She remained there until 2007, when she moved to the University of Chicago.

Her research focuses on the study of contact linguistics and language shift, discourse and conversation analysis, deixis, and issues in the study of language endangerment, attrition, and revitalization.

== Honors and awards ==
In 2018, Grenoble was awarded a Guggenheim Fellowship for her work in Linguistics.

Grenoble was elected to the American Academy of Arts and Sciences in 2017. She was elected to serve as the Secretary-Treasurer of the Linguistic Society of America for a five-year term from 2018 to 2023.

In 2022, her work Language Contact in the Territory of the Former Soviet Union won the Best Book in Linguistics award from AATSEEL.

She was inducted as a Fellow of the Linguistic Society of America in 2023. Grenoble received the Quantrell Award in 2025.

== Selected works ==
- Lenore A. Grenoble & Jessica Kantarovich. 2022. Reconstructing non-standard languages: A socially-anchored approach. Amsterdam: John Benjamins Press.
- Diana Forker & Lenore A. Grenoble (eds.) 2021. Language Contact in the Territory of the Former Soviet Union. Amsterdam: John Benjamins Press.
- Balthasar Bickel, David A. Peterson, Lenore A. Grenoble & Alan Timberlake (eds.) 2013. Language Typology and Historical Contingency. Amsterdam: John Benjamins Press.
- Lenore A. Grenoble & N. Louanna Furbee (eds.) 2010. Language Documentation: Practices and Values. Amsterdam: John Benjamins Press.
- Lenore A. Grenoble & Lindsay J. Whaley. 2006. Saving Languages. An Introduction to Language Revitalization. Cambridge: Cambridge University Press.
- Lenore A. Grenoble. 2003. Language Policy in the Former Soviet Union. Dordrecht: Kluwer Academic Press.
- Nadezhda Ja. Bulatova & Lenore A. Grenoble. 1999. Evenki. Languages of the World Materials/141. Munich: Lincom.
- Lenore A. Grenoble & Lindsay J. Whaley (eds.) 1998. Endangered Languages: Current Issues and Future Prospects. Cambridge: Cambridge University Press.
- Lenore A. Grenoble. 1998. Deixis and Information Packaging in Russian Discourse. Pragmatics & Beyond, 50. Amsterdam: John Benjamins Press.
- Lenore A. Grenoble & John M. Kopper (eds.) 1997. Essays in the Art and Theory of Translation. Lewiston, NY: Edwin Mellen Press.
