= Amy Sayer =

Australian soccer player (born 2001)

Personal information
- Full name: Amy Joan Irene Sayer
- Date of birth: 30 November 2001 (age 24)
- Place of birth: Sydney, New South Wales, Australia
- Height: 1.73 m (5 ft 8 in)
- Positions: Midfielder; forward

Team information
- Current team: Malmö
- Number: 21

Youth career
- Northbridge FC
  - 2013: FNSW Institute

College career
| Years | Team | Apps | (Gls) |
| 2020–2022 | Stanford Cardinal | 48 | (6) |

Senior career*
| Years | Team | Apps | (Gls) |
| 2013–2016 | FNSW Institute | 24 | (22) |
| 2016–2017 | Sydney University | 4 | (2) |
| 2017–2018 | Canberra United | 10 | (1) |
| 2018–2020 | Sydney FC | 11 | (1) |
| 2023 | San Francisco Glens | 6 | (2) |
| 2023–2025 | Kristianstad | 34 | (5) |
| 2026– | Malmö | 2 | (1) |

International career^{‡}
| 2016 | Australia U-17 | 8 | (3) |
| 2016 | Australia U-20 | 17 | (13) |
| 2022– | Australia U-23 | 3 | (5) |
| 2018– | Australia | 28 | (5) |
- * Club domestic league appearances and goals as of 22 April 2026 ‡ National team caps and goals as of 10 October 2026

Amy Joan Irene Sayer
- Traditional Chinese: 艾米瓊艾琳塞耶
- Simplified Chinese: 艾米琼艾琳塞耶
Transcriptions
Standard Mandarin
- Hanyu Pinyin: Ài mǐ qióng ài lín sāi yé
- IPA: [aɪ̯˥˩ mi˨˩˦ tɕʰjʊŋ˧˥ aɪ̯˥˩ lin˧˥ saɪ̯˥ jɛ˥]

Amy Joan Irene Sayer (/aɪˈriːn ˈseɪər/ eye-REEN SAY-er; born 30 November 2001) is an Australian soccer player who plays as a midfielder for Damallsvenskan club Malmö FF and the Australia national team.

Primarily an attacking midfielder, Sayer was deployed as a defensive midfielder in the under-20 national team. She is known for her vision, passing, all-round technical ability, and playing and scoring with either foot.

== Early life and education ==
Sayer was born in Sydney, New South Wales, Australia, and grew up with an older sibling in Northern Sydney. They are of Chinese descent via their mother. She attended Ravenswood School for Girls for primary education and then Barker College for secondary.

As a junior she followed her sibling to play for Northbridge FC, and then Football New South Wales Institute (FNSW Institute) from 2013. Subsequently she joined various FNSW Institute's teams, which competed in the National Premier Leagues NSW Women's during 2013 to 2016. In 2014 she played 24 matches for the 13-year-olds providing 11 goals as well as 3 games for the 15s with one goal. In the following year she kicked eight goals across 16 games for the under-15s. 2016–2017 Sayer played for Sydney University. For tertiary education she enrolled at Stanford University in January 2020 (see College career, below). For her first year she undertook a broad set of subjects, before intending to specialise. At Stanford ,she completed a degree in human biology and philosophy.

== Club career ==
=== Canberra United ===
Sayer signed with Canberra United in the W-League (later renamed A-League Women) in October 2017 ahead of the 2017–18 season after impressive performances for the Australia women's national under-20 soccer team (Young Matildas), along with teammates Georgia Plessas, Georgia Boric, Clare Hunt, and Karly Roestbakken.

On 25 November Sayer scored her first goal in the country's top division in a 3–2 home win against Perth Glory at McKellar Park. She finished the season with one goal in her ten appearances, as well as being deployed in various positions such as an attacking midfielder and a left winger by manager Heather Garriock. Sayer had been coached by Garriock while at Sydney University and with Young Matildas.

=== Sydney FC ===
Sayer signed for W-League team, Sydney FC on 4 September 2018 after her sole season at Canberra United. On 3 November, she scored her maiden goal for her new club against Melbourne City in her first appearance. On 9 November 2018, Sayer was diagnosed with a stress fracture in her right foot and was sidelined for five months. She was also withdrawn from international duties with the Australia squad. Overall she played 11 qames for Sydney by the end of their 2019–20 season. She transferred to Stanford Cardinal (see College career, below).

=== San Francisco Glens SC ===
Sayer joined San Francisco Glens SC for the 2023 USL W League season. Playing both midfield and forward, she was a key part of the starting lineup as the Glens rose to No. 1 in the national power rankings. However, her season was cut short after six games when she was called to Australia's provisional roster for the 2023 FIFA Women's World Cup. San Francisco would go on to capture both the NorCal Division and Western Conference titles before falling in the W League National Semifinal. Despite the premature end to her season, Sayer still finished second on the team with four assists and netted twice.

=== Kristianstads DFF ===
On 23 August 2023, Kristianstads DFF of the Damallsvenskan announced that they had signed Sayer to a contract through 2024. In April 2024 she ruptured her anterior cruciate ligament and undertook treatment and rehabilitation. Her contract was extended and she returned to club duties in the following year. Sayer played a total of 34 matches and provided five goals across her three (interrupted) years with the team. She subsequently became a free agent at the end of 2025.

=== Malmö FF ===
Sayer joined fellow Damallsvenskan team, Malmö FF in January 2026, alongside Australian women's national teammate Courtney Nevin.

== College career ==
While at Stanford University she joined the Stanford Cardinal, after the W-League's 2019–20 season had ended.

=== 2020 ===
During the 2020 season (which was delayed to early 2021), Sayer quickly stood out, starting in 9 of her 10 appearances for the team. In these appearances, Sayer racked up a total of 679 minutes of action, playing more than 50 minutes in 8 matches. Throughout the season, Sayer primarily played in the midfield, utilising her vision to move the ball quickly and maintain possession. This style of play led to Sayer capturing one assist on the season and earning the honour of being on the 2020 PAC-12 All-Freshman team. Her performances garnered the attention of the Australia women's national soccer team (Matildas) once again, leading to a call up to the squad for two international friendlies against Germany and the Netherlands. These friendlies took place in the Netherlands, causing Sayer to miss the middle portion of her Stanford season due to international duty.

=== 2021 ===
With little time between the end of the 2020 season and the beginning of the 2021 season, Sayer picked up where she left off, making 19 appearances and starting in 7 games for the Cardinal with the majority of her minutes coming at the forward position. Adapting to the new position, Sayer excelled, nabbing 2 assists as well as 2 goals, her first for the team. Her goals came in back-to-back games with the second coming against in a 3–1 victory against the 2020 Champions the Santa Clara Broncos. Sayer's performances helped the Cardinal to a 13–6–1 record and an invitation to the NCAA Division I Women's Soccer Championship, in which they lost in the first round.

=== 2022 ===
Heading into the 2022 season, Sayer built on her success as a forward by being a starter in five of the first six games of the season, nabbing three goals during this span. Two of those goals came in a 5–1 win against the UC Santa Barbara Gauchos after Sayer came on as a substitute in the 17th minute. During the remainder of the season, Sayer split playing time amongst her other teammates, appearing in 19 matches in total, primarily coming in as a substitute. Sayer finished the season accumulating a total of 548 minutes, her lowest amount in her three seasons with the Cardinal despite improving in most major statistical categories (goals, assists, shot percentage, shots on goal, shot accuracy, and game-winning goals). By the season's end, Sayer ended with had a total of 4 goals, 2 assists, and a shot on goal percentage of 51.6%. This helped the Cardinal to a 17–2–2 regular season record and earned the team outright Pac-12 Champions and an automatic berth to the NCAA Division I Women's Soccer Championship as a 3-seed in the tournament. After their title-clinching 1–1 draw against the University of California, Berkeley, Sayer was called up to the Australia women's national soccer team, and missed the first round of the NCAA Division I Women's Soccer Championship. She returned immediately afterwards to play in the second round against the BYU Cougars women's soccer team, in which the team lost 5–4 on penalty kicks.

== International career ==
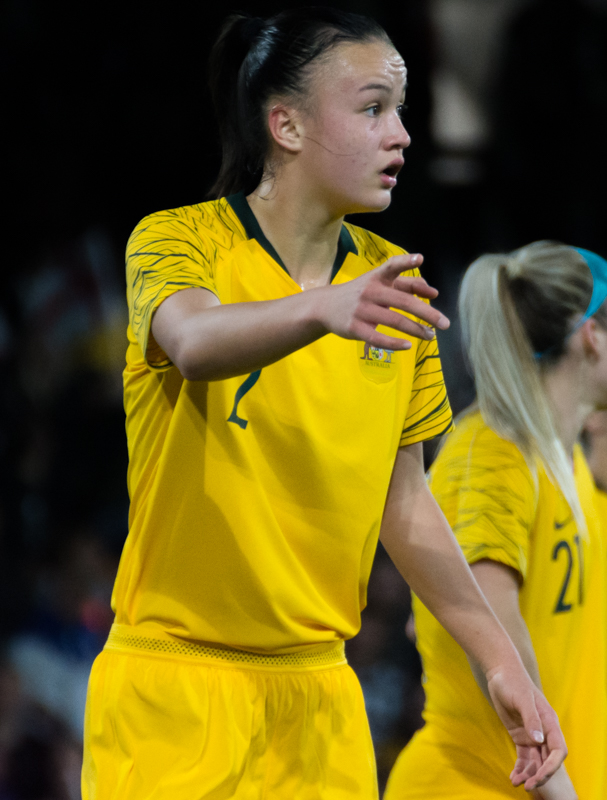
Sayer with Australia in 2018.

=== National youth teams ===
Sayer made her international youth debut as a midfielder for the Australia women's national under-17 soccer team (Junior Matildas) in the 2017 AFC U-16 Championship qualifiers on 25 August 2016, in a 28–0 defeat over Palestine U-17, held in Hanoi, Vietnam. She marked her debut with a goal in the first half of that match. Sayer followed her first cap in three more dominating displays by the Junior Matildas against Hong Kong (14–0), Iraq (8–0) and Vietnam (6–0).

In October 2016, while still 14 years old, Sayer, as a forward, earned her first call up to the Young Matildas (under-20s) for the 2017 AFC pre-qualifiers held in Nanjing, China in November 2016. She made two appearances in the team's games, and scored two goals. Following her debut tournament, Sayer was reselected in the Young Matilda's squad for a friendly series against visitors USA and Canada in July 2017, held in Canberra, and for the 2017 AFC U-19 Women's Championship held in Nanjing, China in mid-October. She made four more appearances, as a midfielder, during the group stage and final series.

Sayer made her next appearance for the Young Matildas in March 2018 during a friendly against visiting Thailand under-20s, where she scored a goal in their 2–1 victory in Sydney. In October of that year, Sayer, as a midfielder, travelled with the team to Lebanon, to compete in the 2019 AFC U-19 Women's Championship qualifiers against Mongolia, Lebanon and Hong Kong. She scored a goal in Australia's 18-0 demolition of Mongolia, another goal against Lebanon and a brace against Hong Kong, converting the first from the penalty spot, and the second from outside the box – she was voted Most Valuable Player for the latter match.

Sayer was called up to the Australia women's national under-23 soccer team (U23 Matildas) squad to participate in the 2022 AFF Women's Championship. She appeared in 3 matches for the squad, scoring five goals during the tournament, four of which were in a 4–0 thrashing of Thailand. Sayer scored her hattrick within the first 15 minutes of play before adding a fourth in the 44th minute. Despite the team not securing enough points to advance out of the group stage of the tournament, Sayer's goalscoring was enough to nab her a shared title of third highest goal scorer in the tournament.

=== National senior team ===
On 16 July 2018, coach Alen Stajcic called up Sayer to the senior national team (Matildas) squad to participate in the Tournament of Nations in the United States after impressing in her maiden W-League season in with 10 appearances. She earned her first international cap as a 93rd-minute substitute in that tournament's 2–0 win against Japan on 2 August.

Sayer was called up to the Matildas squad to play friendlies against France and England in October of that year. She came on as a substitute against France but her team could not prevent a 2–0 defeat, while she started the second match against England in a 1–1 draw following a last minute header from Clare Polkinghorne. On 9 November 2018, Sayer withdrew from the Matildas squad for the two-match series against Chile after a stress fracture diagnosis (see Sydney FC section above).

==== 2021 ====
During April 2021, Sayer made her way back onto the Matildas squad to participate in two friendlies against Germany and the Netherlands. These were the first matches played by the team since the beginning of the COVID-19 pandemic, giving greater significance to the matches. In the match against Germany on 10 April 2021, Sayer was substituted on in the 57th minute, marking her fourth ever appearance for the squad. She played 33 minutes at the attacking midfield position as the match would play out to a 5–2 score line in favour of Germany.

==== 2022 ====
In June 2022, Sayer was called back up to the Matildas for a two-match away set of friendlies against Spain and Portugal. During their match against Spain, Sayer made her fifth appearance with the squad after being substituted on in 67th minute. Despite resulting in a 7–0 loss for the Matildas, Sayer managed to make one shot at goals during her matchtime. In the match against Portugal, Sayer made her sixth appearance for the Matildas, as a substitute in the 84th minute of the 1–1 draw.

Following her impressive performance in the 2022 AFF Women's Championship, Sayer was once again promoted to the seniors for a series of home friendlies against Sweden and Thailand in November 2022. The team won both games fixtures with a score line of 4–0 against Sweden, and 2–0 against Thailand.

==== 2023 ====
After a string of impressive performances in the USL W League with the San Francisco Glens, Sayer was called up to the Matildas by head coach Tony Gustavsson for their 2023 FIFA Women's World Cup 29-player prelliminary roster, but dropped from the 23-player final squad. In October, Sayer was selected as part of the Matildas for the 2024 AFC Women's Olympic Qualifying Tournament, hosted in Perth. She played in all three matches (including a start against Iran) and recorded an assist for Australia's third goal against Chinese Taipei in a 3–0 win.

==== 2024 ====
On 28 February playing in an Olympic qualifier against Uzbekistan in Melbourne, Sayer was a second-half substitute and scored her first goal for the national team in the fourth minute of extra time. This took the team's score to 10–0 and they qualified for the 2024 Paris Olympic Games. However, in April of that year she ruptured her anterior cruciate ligament and was unavailable for Olympic selection.

==== 2025 ====
The midfielder returned to the national team on 30 May 2025 for a two-game friendly set against visitors Argentina, in the second game she scored a brace to help the Matildas win 4–1. Sayer scored another goal for the team in a 5-0 victory against New Zealand on 28 November in Gosford.

== Career statistics ==
As of match played 5 March 2026
Scores and results list Australia's goal tally first, score column indicates score after each Sayer goal.

List of international goals scored by Amy Sayer
| No. | Date | Venue | Opponent | Score | Result | Competition |
|---|---|---|---|---|---|---|
| 1 | 28 February 2024 | Marvel Stadium, Melbourne, Australia | Uzbekistan | 10–0 | 10–0 | 2024 AFC Women's Olympic Qualifying Tournament |
| 2 | 2 June 2025 | GIO Stadium, Canberra, Australia | Argentina | 1–0 | 4–1 | Friendly |
| 3 | 2 June 2025 | GIO Stadium, Canberra, Australia | Argentina | 2–0 | 4–1 | Friendly |
| 4 | 28 November 2025 | polytec Stadium, Gosford, Australia | New Zealand | 1–0 | 5–0 | Friendly |
| 5 | 5 March 2026 | Gold Coast Stadium, Gold Coast, Australia | Iran | 1–0 | 4–0 | 2026 Women's Asian Cup |

== Honours ==
Sydney FC

- W-League Championship: 2018–19

Stanford Cardinal

- Pac-12 Conference Champion: 2022

San Francisco Glens SC

- USL W League NorCal Division Champion: 2023
- USL W League Western Conference Champion: 2023

Australia

- FIFA Series: 2026

Individual

- Pac-12 Conference All-Freshman Team: 2020
- Pac-12 Conference Fall Academic Honor Roll: 2021
