= Studies in Language =

- Discipline: Linguistics
- Language: English
- Edited by: Lindsay Whaley, Katharina Haude

Publication details
- History: 1977-present
- Publisher: John Benjamins Publishing Company
- Frequency: Quarterly
- Impact factor: 0.527 (2011)

Standard abbreviations
- ISO 4: Stud. Lang.

Indexing
- ISSN: 0378-4177 (print); 1569-9978 (web)
- OCLC no.: 3404175

Links
- Journal homepage; Online access

Studies in Language is a peer-reviewed academic journal covering research in linguistics as viewed from discourse-pragmatic, functional, and typological perspectives. It is published by John Benjamins Publishing Company and was established in 1977. Its managing editors are Lindsay Whaley and Katharina Haude.

Former editors were Ekkehard König (Freie Universität Berlin), John Verhaar, Bernard Comrie, and Balthasar Bickel.

This journal, along with Linguistics and Philosophy, is a continuation of the journal Foundations of Language (1965 to 1976).
