= Courtney Nevin =

Australian soccer player (born 2002)

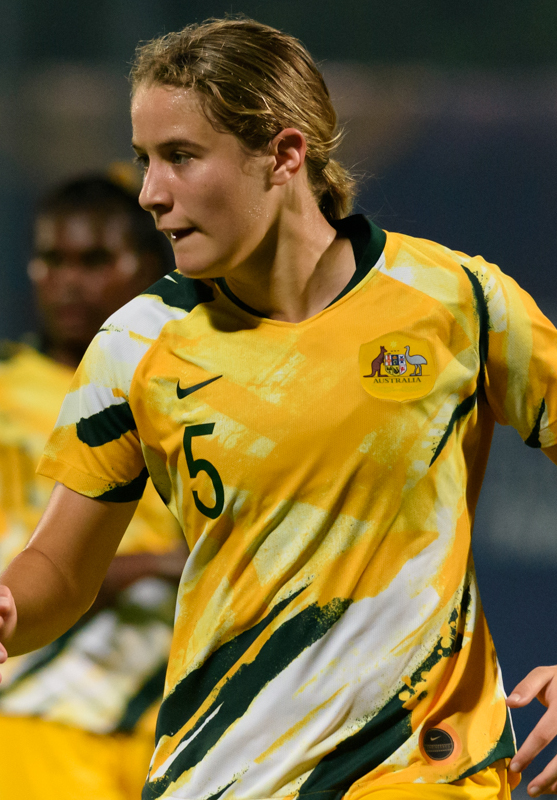
- Nevin with Australia U20 in 2019

Personal information
- Full name: Courtney Jade Nevin
- Date of birth: 12 February 2002 (age 24)
- Place of birth: Blacktown, New South Wales, Australia
- Height: 1.65 m (5 ft 5 in)
- Position: Full-back

Team information
- Current team: Malmö
- Number: 18

Youth career
- Oakville United

Senior career*
Years	Team	Apps	(Gls)
2018–2021	Western Sydney Wanderers	28	(0)
2021–2022	Melbourne Victory	15	(1)
2022–2023	Hammarby	22	(3)
2023	→ Leicester City (loan)	12	(0)
2023–2025	Leicester City	41	(0)
2025–	Malmö	16	(1)

International career^{‡}
2016	Australia U17	3	(10)
2018–2019	Australia U20	9	(2)
2021–	Australia	46	(1)
- * Club domestic league appearances and goals as of 22 April 2026 ‡ National team caps and goals as of 10 October 2026

Courtney Jade Nevin (/ˈnɛvɪn/ NEV-in; born 12 February 2002) is an Australian professional soccer player who plays as a full-back for Damallsvenskan club Malmö FF and the Australia national team. She has previously played for Western Sydney Wanderers and Melbourne Victory in the W-League, as well as Damallsvenskan side Hammarby IF and Women's Super League (WSL) side Leicester City.

== Club career ==
=== Junior years ===
Nevin started playing soccer at her local club, Oakville Ravens, in Blacktown. She started playing at high level from the age of 11, and was at the beginning supported by her school, Oakville Public School. Later she played for Parklea and for Blacktown Spartans. In 2018, Nevin played for Football NSW Institute, where she scored 11 goals in 25 games and won the 2018 NPLW NSW Player of the Year award.

=== Lower tier ===
Nevin played for Sydney Olympic in the 2020 National Premier Leagues NSW Women's season, helping them finish second. In February 2021, Nevin re-signed with Blacktown Spartans for the 2021 National Premier Leagues NSW Women's season.

=== Western Sydney Wanderers ===
In September 2018, Nevin joined her hometown W-League club Western Sydney Wanderers after training with the club following her strong season with Football NSW Institute. She played nine matches in the 2018–19 W-League season, pushing offensively with 188 passes and creating five scoring chances, while also defending with nine tackles and winning 15 duels. Her performance received praise from others, including American international Kristen Hamilton, who said that she's mature with a unique knowledge of the game for her age. Nevin re-signed with the club in September 2019, in time for the new season, alongside goalkeeper Jada Whyman. In September 2020, Nevin re-signed with Western Sydney Wanderers for her third season, after playing all 13 of the club's matches in the 2019–20 W-League season. A few days later, she was voted by her team-mates as the club's W-League Player of the Year and was awarded the Wanderers Medal. She was praised by assistant coach Catherine Cannuli who called her an unbelievable talent who uses hard work and determination.

=== Melbourne Victory ===
In October 2021, Nevin joined defending premiers Melbourne Victory, ahead of the 2021–22 A-League Women season, heralded as one of the country's best young talents. At the end of the season, Melbourne Victory were crowned champions through a 2–1 final win against Sydney FC.

=== Hammarby IF ===
On 15 March 2022, Nevin transferred to Hammarby IF in the Swedish Damallsvenskan, together with teammate Kyra Cooney-Cross, signing a two-year-contract.

=== Leicester City ===
In January 2023, Nevin was loaned to English Women's Super League club Leicester City until the end of the season with an option to buy. In July of that year, Nevin joined Leicester City as a permanent transfer. In July 2025, the club confirmed that Nevin departed at the conclusion of her contract.

=== Malmö FF ===
On 1 August 2025, Nevin returned to Sweden, signing with Damallsvenskan side Malmö FF on a three-year contract. Nevin scored her first goal for the club on 18 October 2025 in a 4–1 away win over Djurgårdens IF.

== International career ==
=== Youth ===
In August 2016, Nevin was called up by Ante Juric to the 23-player squad for the 2017 AFC U-16 Women's Championship qualifiers, contested in Vietnam by Australia's under-17 squad (Junior Matildas). In their opening match, Nevin scored nine goals in a 28–0 victory over Palestine. She played also in the 8–0 victory over Iraq and scored her 10th goal of the qualifiers in a 6–0 victory over Vietnam. She was one of the players who excelled at the games, finishing second on Australia's goalscorers, behind Sofia Sakalis who scored 11 goals.

In June 2018, Nevin was called up by Leah Blayney to Australia's under-20 squad (Young Matildas) who competed at the 2018 AFF Women's Championship in Indonesia against senior teams from the ASEAN Football Federation. In the group stage, she played in the 7–0 victory over Malaysia and in the 4–2 defeat to Thailand. Australia qualified for the knockout stage from the second place in the group, and Nevin scored the second goal in the 4–2 victory over Vietnam in the semi-final and also played in the final which Australia lost 3–2 to Thailand. In October 2019, Nevin was once more called up by Blayney, this time for the 2019 AFC U-19 Women's Championship squad. She played in all five games of the tournament: a 5–1 defeat to North Korea, a 3–1 victory over Thailand in which she scored the third goal from a free kick, a 1–0 victory over Vietnam, a 7–0 loss to Japan in the semi-finals, and a 9–1 loss to South Korea in the third place match.

=== Senior ===
In September 2019, Nevin was called up for a training camp of Australia's senior team, ahead of their friendlies against Chile. The camp took place during her studies for the HSC and she said she felt both excited and scared to train alongside her heroes. In June 2021, Nevin was called up for the first time for a senior international match squad, when Tony Gustavsson selected her in his 25-player squad for friendlies against Denmark and Sweden. She found out she was called-up while watching television with her friend and team-mate Kyra Cooney-Cross. She made her debut in the first match against Denmark, coming on as a substitute in the second half of the 3–2 defeat.

In June 2021, Nevin was called up as a travelling reserve player to Australia's 2020 Olympics squad. Subsequently, due to the COVID-19 pandemic, FIFA confirmed a change for the 2020 Olympics, allowing all 22 players to be available on the roster, with 18 being named for each match. At the Tokyo 2020 Olympics (delayed to July–August 2021), the Matildas advanced to the quarter-finals with one victory and a draw in the group play. In the quarter-finals they beat Great Britain 4–3 after extra time. However, they lost 1–0 to Sweden in the semi-final and were then beaten 4–3 in the bronze medal playoff by USA.

In July 2023, Nevin was named as part of Australia's 23-woman squad for the 2023 FIFA Women's World Cup, held in Australia and New Zealand. Nevin scored her maiden goal for the Matildas in an away friendly 1–2 win against Wales on 25 October 2025 in Cardiff.

== Career statistics ==
=== International ===
As of match played 25 October 2025
Scores and results list Australia's goal tally first, score column indicates score after each Nevin goal.

List of international goals scored by Courtney Nevin
No.	Date	Venue	Opponent	Score	Result	Competition
1	25 October 2025	Cardiff City Stadium, Cardiff, Wales	Wales	1–0	2–1	Friendly

== Style of play ==
Nevin plays as a full back, but also goes forward often. Her scoring and assisting with her left foot earned her the nickname "Lethal".

== Personal life ==
Courtney Nevin was born in 2002 to mother Angelica and father Phil Nevin, and grew up in the Hawkesbury suburb of Oakville, New South Wales. At 14 years-old, to practice scoring, her father built a custom goal in their backyard. Nevin graduated from Westfields Sports High School in 2019, alongside fellow Junior Matilda, Kyra Cooney-Cross. Cooney-Cross moved in with the Nevins family for their final year of secondary education.

== Honours ==
Melbourne Victory

- A-League Finals: 2021-22

Hammarby

- Damallsvenskan: 2023
- Svenska Cupen: 2022-23

Australia

- FIFA Series: 2026
