= Martin Haspelmath =

German linguist

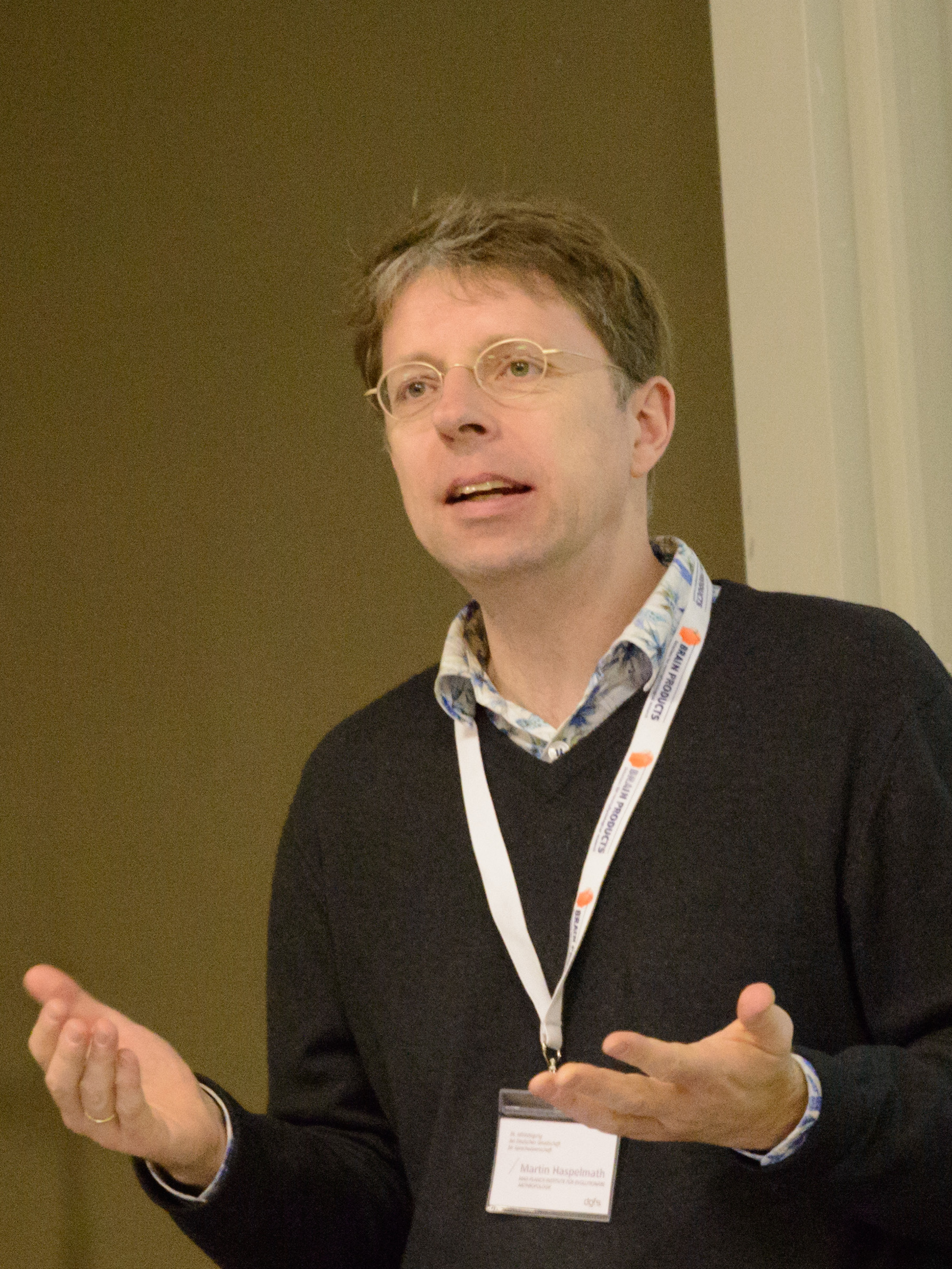
- Born: 2 February 1963 (age 63); Hoya, Lower Saxony
- Occupation: Linguist

Academic background
- Education: University of Vienna; University of Cologne; University at Buffalo; Free University of Berlin
- Thesis: A typological study of indefinite pronouns (1993)
- Doctoral advisor: Ekkehard König
- Other advisors: Edith A. Moravcsik; Wolfgang U. Dressler

Academic work
- Discipline: Linguistic typology
- Sub-discipline: Syntactic and morphological theory
- Institutions: Free University of Berlin; Max Planck Institute for Evolutionary Anthropology

Martin Haspelmath (German: [ˈmaʁtiːn ˈhaspl̩maːt]; born 2 February 1963 in Hoya, Lower Saxony) is a German linguist working in the field of linguistic typology. He is a researcher at the Max Planck Institute for Evolutionary Anthropology in Leipzig, where he worked from 1998 to 2015 and again since 2020. Between 2015 and 2020, he worked at the Max Planck Institute for the Science of Human History. He is also an honorary professor of linguistics at the University of Leipzig.

== Career ==
Haspelmath is one of the editors of the World Atlas of Language Structures and the Glottolog online database, one of the founders of the open access publisher Language Science Press, and has worked on the Standard Average European sprachbund. Besides typology, his research interests include syntactic and morphological theory, language change and language contact.

He is a member of the Academia Europaea. According to Google Scholar, his work has been cited over 50,000 times and he has an h-index of 95 (as of February 2026). Very active on social media (Facebook), Haspelmath promotes open access publishing in his postings, and raises bigger cross-disciplinary linguistic issues.

== Publications ==
=== Monographs ===
- A grammar of Lezgian. Berlin: Mouton de Gruyter, 1993. — 567 pp. — (Mouton Grammar Library, 9)
- Indefinite pronouns. Oxford: Oxford University Press, 1997. — 364 pp. — (Oxford Studies in Typology and Linguistic Theory)
- From space to time: Temporal adverbials in the world's languages. Munich & Newcastle: Lincom Europa, 1997. — 181 pp. — (Lincom Studies in Theoretical Linguistics, 3)
- Understanding morphology. London: Arnold, 2002. — 290 pp. (second edition: with Andrea D. Sims, London: Hodder Education, 2010, — 366 pp.)

=== Edited volumes ===
- Converbs in cross-linguistic perspective: structure and meaning of adverbial verb forms — adverbial participles, gerunds / Ed. by Martin Haspelmath & Ekkehard König. Berlin: Mouton de Gruyter, 1995. — 565 pp. — (Empirical Approaches to Language Typology, 13)
- Language typology and language universals: An international handbook / Ed. by Martin Haspelmath, Ekkehard König, Wulf Oesterreicher and Wolfgang Raible. Vol. 1–2. Berlin: de Gruyter, 2001. — 1856 pp.
- Coordinating constructions / Ed. by Martin Haspelmath. Amsterdam: Benjamins, 2004. — 576 pp. — (Typological Studies in Language, 58)
- The World Atlas of Language Structures / Ed. by Martin Haspelmath, Matthew S. Dryer, David Gil and Bernard Comrie. Oxford: Oxford University Press, 2005. — 695 pp.
- Loanwords in the World's Languages: A Comparative Handbook / Ed. by Martin Haspelmath & Uri Tadmor. Berlin: Mouton de Gruyter, 2009. — 1081 pp.
- Studies in Ditransitive Constructions: A Comparative Handbook / Ed. by Andrej Malchukov, Martin Haspelmath and Bernard Comrie. Berlin: Mouton De Gruyter, 2010. — 772 pp.
