= 2015 AFC U-16 Women's Championship qualification =

Tournament details
- Host countries: Bahrain (Group A); Bangladesh (Group B); Malaysia (Groups C and D)
- Dates: 4 October – 25 December 2014
- Teams: 21 (from 1 confederation)

Tournament statistics
- Matches played: 24
- Goals scored: 154 (6.42 per match)
- Attendance: 7,250 (302 per match)
- Top scorer: (Chinese Taipei) Liang Kai-jou (10 goals)

The 2015 AFC U-16 Women's Championship qualification was a women's under-16 football competition which decided the participating teams of the 2015 AFC U-16 Women's Championship. Players born between 1 January 1999 and 31 December 2001 were eligible to compete in the tournament.

A total of eight teams qualified to play in the final tournament, including Japan, North Korea, China PR (hosts), and Thailand, who qualified directly as the top four finishers of the 2013 AFC U-16 Women's Championship.

The top two teams of the final tournament qualified for the 2016 FIFA U-17 Women's World Cup in Jordan (besides Jordan who qualified automatically as hosts).

== Draw ==
The draw for the qualifiers was held on 17 June 2014 at the AFC House in Kuala Lumpur. A total of 21 AFC member national teams entered the qualifying stage and were drawn into four groups.

- West Zone had 12 entrants from Central Asia, South Asia and West Asia, where they were drawn into two groups of six teams.
- East Zone had 9 entrants from ASEAN and East Asia (excluding direct qualifiers Japan, North Korea, China, and Thailand), where they were drawn into one group of five teams and one group of four teams.

The teams were seeded according to their performance in the previous season in 2013.

	Pot 1	Pot 2	Pot 3	Pot 4	Pot 5	Pot 6
West Zone (Groups A–B)	Bangladesh; Sri Lanka	Iran; Uzbekistan	Bahrain; Jordan	India; Palestine	Kyrgyzstan; United Arab Emirates	Qatar; Tajikistan
East Zone (Groups C–D)	Australia; Chinese Taipei	South Korea; Myanmar	Hong Kong; Philippines	Cambodia; Northern Mariana^{1}	Vietnam	

Did not enter
West Zone	Afghanistan; Bhutan; Iraq; Kuwait; Lebanon; Maldives; Nepal; Oman; Pakistan; Saudi Arabia; Syria; Turkmenistan; Yemen
East Zone	Brunei; Guam; Indonesia; Laos; Macau; Malaysia; Mongolia; Singapore; Timor-Leste

Notes
^{1} Non-FIFA member, ineligible for World Cup.

== Format ==
In each group, teams played each other once at a centralised venue. The four group winners qualified for the final tournament.

=== Tiebreakers ===
The teams were ranked according to points (3 points for a win, 1 point for a draw, 0 points for a loss). If tied on points, tiebreakers would be applied in the following order:

1. Greater number of points obtained in the group matches between the teams concerned;
2. Goal difference resulting from the group matches between the teams concerned;
3. Greater number of goals scored in the group matches between the teams concerned;
4. Goal difference in all the group matches;
5. Greater number of goals scored in all the group matches;
6. Penalty shoot-out if only two teams are involved and they are both on the field of play;
7. Fewer score calculated according to the number of yellow and red cards received in the group matches (1 point for a single yellow card, 3 points for a red card as a consequence of two yellow cards, 3 points for a direct red card, 4 points for a yellow card followed by a direct red card);
8. Drawing of lots.

== Groups ==
The matches were played between 4–8 October 2014 for Group C; 5–9 October 2014 for Group D; 15–23 October 2014 for Group B; 22–25 December 2014 for Group A.

=== Group A ===
- All matches were initially to be held in Palestine, but were postponed.
- After the withdrawal of four teams, the two remaining teams played two matches against each other, both held in Bahrain.
- Times listed were UTC+3.

Pos	Team	Pld	W	D	L	GF	GA	GD	Pts	Qualification
1	Uzbekistan	2	2	0	0	22	0	+22	6	2015 AFC U-16 Women's Championship
2	Bahrain (H)	2	0	0	2	0	22	−22	0	
3	Kyrgyzstan	0	0	0	0	0	0	0	0	Withdrew
4	Palestine	0	0	0	0	0	0	0	0	Withdrew
5	Sri Lanka	0	0	0	0	0	0	0	0	Withdrew
6	Tajikistan	0	0	0	0	0	0	0	0	Withdrew

Source: AFC
Rules for classification: Qualification tiebreakers
(H) Hosts
22 December 2014
18:00

Uzbekistan	17–0	Bahrain
Ergasheva 10', 20', 23'; Kurbonova 26', 29', 34', 42', 45', 48', 49'; Panjieva 28', 50'; Askarova 55', 68'; Bobokhujaeva 59', 65'; Utamova 77'	Report

Khalifa Sports City Stadium, Isa Town
Attendance: 150
Referee: Maria Piedade Rebello (India)

25 December 2014
18:00

Bahrain	0–5	Uzbekistan
	Report	Boboeva 32', 41'; Panjieva 37'; Ergasheva 55'; Kurbonova 77'

Khalifa Sports City Stadium, Isa Town
Attendance: 50
Referee: Cong Thi Dung (Vietnam)

=== Group B ===
- All matches were held in Bangladesh.
- Times listed were UTC+6.

Pos	Team	Pld	W	D	L	GF	GA	GD	Pts	Qualification
1	Iran	4	4	0	0	19	3	+16	12	2015 AFC U-16 Women's Championship
2	India	4	3	0	1	21	6	+15	9	
3	Bangladesh (H)	4	2	0	2	9	4	+5	6	
4	Jordan	4	1	0	3	12	14	−2	3	
5	United Arab Emirates	4	0	0	4	1	35	−34	0	
6	Qatar	0	0	0	0	0	0	0	0	Withdrew

Source: AFC
Rules for classification: Qualification tiebreakers
(H) Hosts
15 October 2014
14:00

Iran	9–0	United Arab Emirates
Geraeli 1', 51', 68', 81'; Ghasemi 37', 41', 53', 90+1'; Dabbaghi 62'	Report

Bangabandhu National Stadium, Dhaka
Attendance: 200
Referee: Kate Jacewicz (Australia)
15 October 2014
17:00

Jordan	0–1	Bangladesh
	Report	S. Akhter 70' (pen.)

Bangabandhu National Stadium, Dhaka
Attendance: 300
Referee: Wang Jia (China)

17 October 2014
14:00

Iran	2–1	India
Hosseini 71', 88'	Report	Chiru 13'

Bangabandhu National Stadium, Dhaka
Attendance: 300
Referee: Nami Imaizumi (Japan)
17 October 2014
17:00

Bangladesh	6–0	United Arab Emirates
Mali 6', 68'; S. Akhter 9', 23'; Rani 44'; L. Akhter 90+1'	Report

Bangabandhu National Stadium, Dhaka
Attendance: 1,500
Referee: Pannipar Kamnueng (Thailand)

19 October 2014
14:00

United Arab Emirates	1–8	Jordan
Juma 90+2'	Report	Al-Btoush 12'; Isleem 39'; Fahad 44' (o.g.); Zoqash 52'; Abulrob 65', 76'; Sahloul 68'; Zabian 71'

Bangabandhu National Stadium, Dhaka
Attendance: 150
Referee: Mai Hoang Trang (Vietnam)
19 October 2014
17:00

Bangladesh	1–2	India
S. Akhter 21' (pen.)	Report	Devi 30' (pen.), 66'

Bangabandhu National Stadium, Dhaka
Attendance: 1,500
Referee: Kate Jacewicz (Australia)

21 October 2014
14:00

India	12–0	United Arab Emirates
Bardhan 4', 57'; Chiru 7'; Devi 24', 59', 75', 90+2'; Tudu 67'; Samuel 72', 76', 80', 82'	Report

Bangabandhu National Stadium, Dhaka
Attendance: 150
Referee: Mai Hoang Trang (Vietnam)
21 October 2014
17:00

Iran	6–1	Jordan
Geraeli 22', 39', 52'; Ghasemi 42', 83', 84'	Report	Zoqash 45+3'

Bangabandhu National Stadium, Dhaka
Attendance: 200
Referee: Nami Imaizumi (Japan)

23 October 2014
14:00

Jordan	3–6	India
Zoqash 11'; Al-Naber 53'; Isleem 74'	Report	Samuel 20', 69'; Bardhan 22'; Panna 26'; Tudu 88'; Devi 90'

Bangabandhu National Stadium, Dhaka
Attendance: 100
Referee: Pannipar Kamnueng (Thailand)
23 October 2014
17:00

Bangladesh	1–2	Iran
L. Akhter 16'	Report	Geraeli 61'; Ghasemi 71' (pen.)

Bangabandhu National Stadium, Dhaka
Attendance: 2,000
Referee: Kate Jacewicz (Australia)

=== Group C ===
- All matches were held in Malaysia.
- Times listed were UTC+8.

Pos	Team	Pld	W	D	L	GF	GA	GD	Pts	Qualification
1	South Korea	3	3	0	0	15	0	+15	9	2015 AFC U-16 Women's Championship
2	Australia	3	2	0	1	16	1	+15	6	
3	Vietnam	3	1	0	2	7	9	−2	3	
4	Hong Kong	3	0	0	3	0	28	−28	0	
5	Northern Mariana	0	0	0	0	0	0	0	0	Withdrew

Source: AFC
Rules for classification: Qualification tiebreakers
4 October 2014
16:30

Australia	6–0	Vietnam
Taranto 6'; Petratos 13', 31'; Ayres 24', 26'; Maher 90'	Report

Hang Tuah Stadium, Melaka
Attendance: 60
Referee: Qin Liang (China)
4 October 2014
16:30

South Korea	11–0	Hong Kong
Lim Su-bin 15', 50', 61'; Gwon Hui-seon 31', 86'; Song Bo-ram 45'; Yang Hyeon-ji 51'; Ju Yee-un 69', 88'; Eom Keun-byeol 75', 79'	Report

Hang Jebat Stadium, Melaka
Attendance: 10
Referee: Rita Gani (Malaysia)

6 October 2014
16:30

Vietnam	0–3	South Korea
	Report	Park Hye-jeong 31'; Yang Hyeon-ji 44'; Yang Seo-yeong 67'

Hang Tuah Stadium, Melaka
Attendance: 50
Referee: Saltanat Noroozi (Iran)
6 October 2014
16:30

Hong Kong	0–10	Australia
	Report	Cartwright 8', 86'; Bourke 16'; Ammendolia 46', 67', 90+3'; Brodigan 52', 55', 83', 84'

Hang Jebat Stadium, Melaka
Attendance: 50
Referee: Fusako Kajiyama (Japan)

8 October 2014
16:30

Australia	0–1	South Korea
	Report	Im So-jeong 69'

Hang Jebat Stadium, Melaka
Attendance: 100
Referee: Qin Liang (China)
8 October 2014
16:30

Hong Kong	0–7	Vietnam
	Report	Nguyễn Thị Nga 7'; Nguyễn Thị Tuyết Ngân 29', 58'; Nguyễn Thị Nụ 36'; Nguyễn Thi Quỳnh 45+1', 61'; Phạm Thu Hiền 76'

Hang Tuah Stadium, Melaka
Attendance: 60
Referee: Rita Gani (Malaysia)

=== Group D ===
- All matches were held in Malaysia.
- Times listed were UTC+8.

Pos	Team	Pld	W	D	L	GF	GA	GD	Pts	Qualification
1	Chinese Taipei	3	3	0	0	14	2	+12	9	2015 AFC U-16 Women's Championship
2	Myanmar	3	2	0	1	10	2	+8	6	
3	Philippines	3	1	0	2	6	13	−7	3	
4	Cambodia	3	0	0	3	2	15	−13	0	

Source: AFC
Rules for classification: Qualification tiebreakers
5 October 2014
16:30

Chinese Taipei	7–0	Cambodia
Liang Kai-jou 2', 30', 50', 71', 90+1'; Chen Yu-chieh 10', 60' (pen.)	Report

Hang Tuah Stadium, Melaka
Attendance: 50
Referee: Casey Reibelt (Australia)
5 October 2014
16:30

Myanmar	6–0	Philippines
Kay Zin Myint 6'; Thin Thin Yu 9', 55', 71'; Hnin Kalyar Ko 64', 88'	Report

Hang Jebat Stadium, Melaka
Attendance: 90
Referee: Sachiko Yamagishi (Japan)

7 October 2014
16:30

Cambodia	0–4	Myanmar
	Report	Thin Thin Yu 66'; Kay Zin Myint 74'; July Kyaw 75'; Khine Thazin Oo 82'

Hang Tuah Stadium, Melaka
Attendance: 40
Referee: Li Juan (China)
7 October 2014
16:30

Philippines	2–5	Chinese Taipei
Semacio 14'; Bacatan 39'	Report	Liang Kai-jou 2', 10', 15', 76'; Chen Yu-chieh 43'

Hang Jebat Stadium, Melaka
Attendance: 50
Referee: Shiva Yari (Iran)

9 October 2014
16:30

Chinese Taipei	2–0	Myanmar
Huang Yu-tzu 44'; Liang Kai-jou 56'	Report

Hang Jebat Stadium, Melaka
Attendance: 30
Referee: Sachiko Yamagishi (Japan)
9 October 2014
16:30

Philippines	4–2	Cambodia
Jumawan 30'; Bacatan 33'; Semacio 45'; Whaley 89'	Report	Yeurn 8'; Channa 90+3'

Hang Tuah Stadium, Melaka
Attendance: 60
Referee: Casey Reibelt (Australia)

== Qualified teams ==
The following eight teams qualified for the final tournament.

Team	Qualified as	Qualified on	Previous appearances in tournament^{2}
Japan	2013 champions	17 June 2014	5 (**2005**, 2007, 2009, **2011**, **2013**)
North Korea	2013 runners-up	17 June 2014	4 (**2007**, 2009, 2011, 2013)
China	2013 third place / Hosts	17 June 2014	5 (2005, 2007, 2009, 2011, 2013)
Thailand	2013 fourth place	17 June 2014	5 (2005, 2007, 2009, 2011, 2013)
Uzbekistan	Group A winners	25 December 2014	1 (2013)
Iran	Group B winners	23 October 2014	1 (2013)
South Korea	Group C winners	8 October 2014	5 (2005, 2007, **2009**, 2011, 2013)
Chinese Taipei	Group D winners	9 October 2014	3 (2005, 2009, 2013)

^{2} Bold indicates champion for that year. Italic indicates host for that year.

== Goalscorers ==
10 goals

- (Chinese Taipei) Liang Kai-jou

8 goals

- (Iran) Fatemeh Geraeli
- (Iran) Fatemeh Ghasemi
- (Uzbekistan) Shahnoza Kurbonova

7 goals

- (India) Roja Devi

6 goals

- (India) Anushka Samuel

4 goals

- (Australia) Ashlee Brodigan
- (Bangladesh) Sanjida Akhter
- (Myanmar) Thin Thin Yu
- (Uzbekistan) Dildora Ergasheva

3 goals

- (Australia) Eliza Ammendolia
- (Chinese Taipei) Chen Yu-chieh
- (India) Sushmita Bardhan
- (Jordan) Nour Zoqash
- (South Korea) Lim Su-bin
- (Uzbekistan) Maftuna Panjieva

2 goals

- (Australia) Melina Ayres
- (Australia) Joey Cartwright
- (Australia) Panagiota Petratos
- (Bangladesh) Lipi Akhter
- (Bangladesh) Bipasha Mali
- (India) Premi Chiru
- (India) Jabamani Tudu
- (Iran) Fatemeh Hosseini
- (Jordan) Tasneem Abulrob
- (Jordan) Tasnim Isleem
- (Myanmar) Hnin Kalyar Ko
- (Myanmar) Kay Zin Myint
- (Philippines) Itsuko Bacatan
- (Philippines) Joyce Semacio
- (South Korea) Eom Keun-byeol
- (South Korea) Gwon Hui-seon
- (South Korea) Ju Yee-un
- (South Korea) Yang Hyeon-ji
- (Uzbekistan) Ruzikhon Askarova
- (Uzbekistan) Zarina Boboeva
- (Uzbekistan) Feruza Bobokhujaeva
- (Vietnam) Nguyễn Thị Quỳnh
- (Vietnam) Nguyễn Thị Tuyết Ngân

1 goal

- (Australia) Hannah Bourke
- (Australia) Grace Maher
- (Australia) Adriana Taranto
- (Bangladesh) Krishna Rani
- (Cambodia) Song Channa
- (Cambodia) Yon Yeurn
- (Chinese Taipei) Huang Yu-tzu
- (India) Eva Panna
- (Iran) Hajar Dabbaghi
- (Jordan) Leen Al-Btoush
- (Jordan) Jeeda Al-Naber
- (Jordan) Luna Sahloul
- (Jordan) Yasmeen Zabian
- (Myanmar) July Kyaw
- (Myanmar) Khine Thazin Oo
- (Philippines) Mikhaela Jumawan
- (Philippines) Lindsay Whaley
- (South Korea) Im So-jeong
- (South Korea) Park Hye-jeong
- (South Korea) Song Bo-ram
- (South Korea) Yang Seo-yeong
- (United Arab Emirates) Naeema Juma
- (Uzbekistan) Dilnoza Utamova
- (Vietnam) Nguyễn Thị Nga
- (Vietnam) Nguyễn Thị Nụ
- (Vietnam) Phạm Thu Hiền

Own goal

- (United Arab Emirates) Amna Fahad (playing against Jordan)

Source: the-AFC.com
