= Su-In Lee =

South Korean and American computer scientist (born 1979)

Su-In Lee (Korean: 이수인; born 1979) is a South Korean and American computer scientist known for her research on explainable artificial intelligence and its applications in biomedical research. She is a Boeing Endowed Professor of Computer Science in the Paul G. Allen School of Computer Science and Engineering at the University of Washington.

== Education and Career ==
Lee was born in Busan in 1979. She became a student at Seoul Science High School, and earned a bachelor's degree in electrical engineering and computer science from KAIST in 2001. She went to Stanford University for graduate study in computer science, and completed her Ph.D. in 2009 in the Stanford Artificial Intelligence Laboratory with the dissertation Machine learning approaches to understand the genetic basis for complex traits supervised by Daphne Koller.

After postdoctoral research as a visiting assistant professor at Carnegie Mellon University, Lee joined the University of Washington in 2010. She was given a Paul G. Allen Career Development Professorship in 2021, and was named as a Boeing Endowed Professor of Computer Science in 2025.

== Recognition ==
Lee was the 2024 laureate of the Ho-Am Prize in Engineering, and the 2024 recipient of the ISCB Innovator Award of the International Society for Computational Biology.

She was named as a Fellow of the American Institute for Medical and Biological Engineering in 2024, "for development of foundational AI principles and techniques to catalyze biomedical discoveries and insights and advance human health", and as a Fellow of the International Society for Computational Biology in 2025.
