= Hwang Ah-hyeon =

South Korean footballer

Personal information
- Full name: Hwang Ah-hyeon (황아현)
- Date of birth: 12 November 2001 (age 24)
- Place of birth: South Korea
- Height: 1.66 m (5 ft 5 in)
- Position: Midfielder

Youth career
- 2012-2013: Sangdae Elementary School
- 2014-2016: Pohang Hangdo Middle School
- 2017-2019: Pohang Electronic Girls' High School

Senior career*
Years	Team	Apps	(Gls)
2020–2021	INAC Kobe Leonessa		
2022–2025	Hwacheon KSPO		

International career^{‡}
2014-2015	South Korea U-15	8	(1)
2016-2018	South Korea U-17	10	(2)
- * Club domestic league appearances and goals as of 22 May 2023 ‡ National team caps and goals as of 22 May 2023

Hwang Ah-hyeon (born 12 November 2001) is a South Korean former professional footballer who played as a midfielder.

== Youth career ==
Hwang first played competitive football at Sangdae Elementary School in Pohang. From a young age she was known for her goalscoring ability, earning comparisons to national team star Ji So-yun. At the end of her final season playing at U-12 level, Hwang received a commendation award at the annual Cha Bum-kun Football Awards.

In her first year at Pohang Hangdo Middle School, Hwang scored one of two goals to seal victory for the team in the final of the 2014 Unification Cup national women's football tournament. The team later lifted the trophy in the U-15 division of the 2016 Queen's Cup, with Hwang named as the tournament's MVP. She continued her career at U-18 level at Pohang Electronic Girls' High School, at one point receiving a scholarship from the local football federation in recognition of her talent. During her final year of high school, Hwang was captain of the school's football team, leading them during a difficult time when long-serving head coach Lee Seong-cheon died of cancer in April 2019.

== Club career ==
Having excelled within the youth system, Hwang signed her first professional contract with Japanese side INAC Kobe Leonessa as a teenager. Despite remaining at the club for two years, Hwang never made a league appearance for the side and in late 2021 she returned to Korea to participate in the 2022 WK League new players' draft.

At the draft, she was signed by WK League club Hwacheon KSPO. At a training camp ahead of the 2023 season, Hwang suffered a serious anterior cruciate ligament injury which left her unable to play for the entire season. She was part of the Hwacheon squad that lifted the WK League trophy in 2025, completing the first domestic treble in the history of Korean women's football. Hwang announced her retirement from football at the end of the 2025 season.

== International career ==
As a youth player Hwang was tipped as one of the rising stars of Korean women's football, first playing for South Korea at U-14 level. She then represented her country at the 2017 AFC U-16 Women's Championship, scoring a goal in a group stage match against China and later playing in the final, in which South Korea lost 2–0 to North Korea. She made several appearances for the U-17 team including at the 2018 FIFA U-17 Women's World Cup, in which South Korea were knocked out at the group stage.

== Honours ==
=== Sangdae Elementary School ===
- Spring KWFF Tournament winners: 2013
- National Youth Sports Festival winners: 2013

=== Pohang Hangdo Middle School ===
- Unification Cup winners: 2014
- Queen's Cup winners: 2016

=== Hwacheon KSPO ===
- WK League
  - Champions: 2025
  - Regular league champions: 2024, 2025

=== South Korea U-17 ===
- AFC U-16 Women's Championship runners-up: 2017

=== Individual ===
- Spring KWFF Tournament U-12 top goalscorer: 2013
- Queen's Cup MVP: 2016
