= Jeszkotle =

- Village
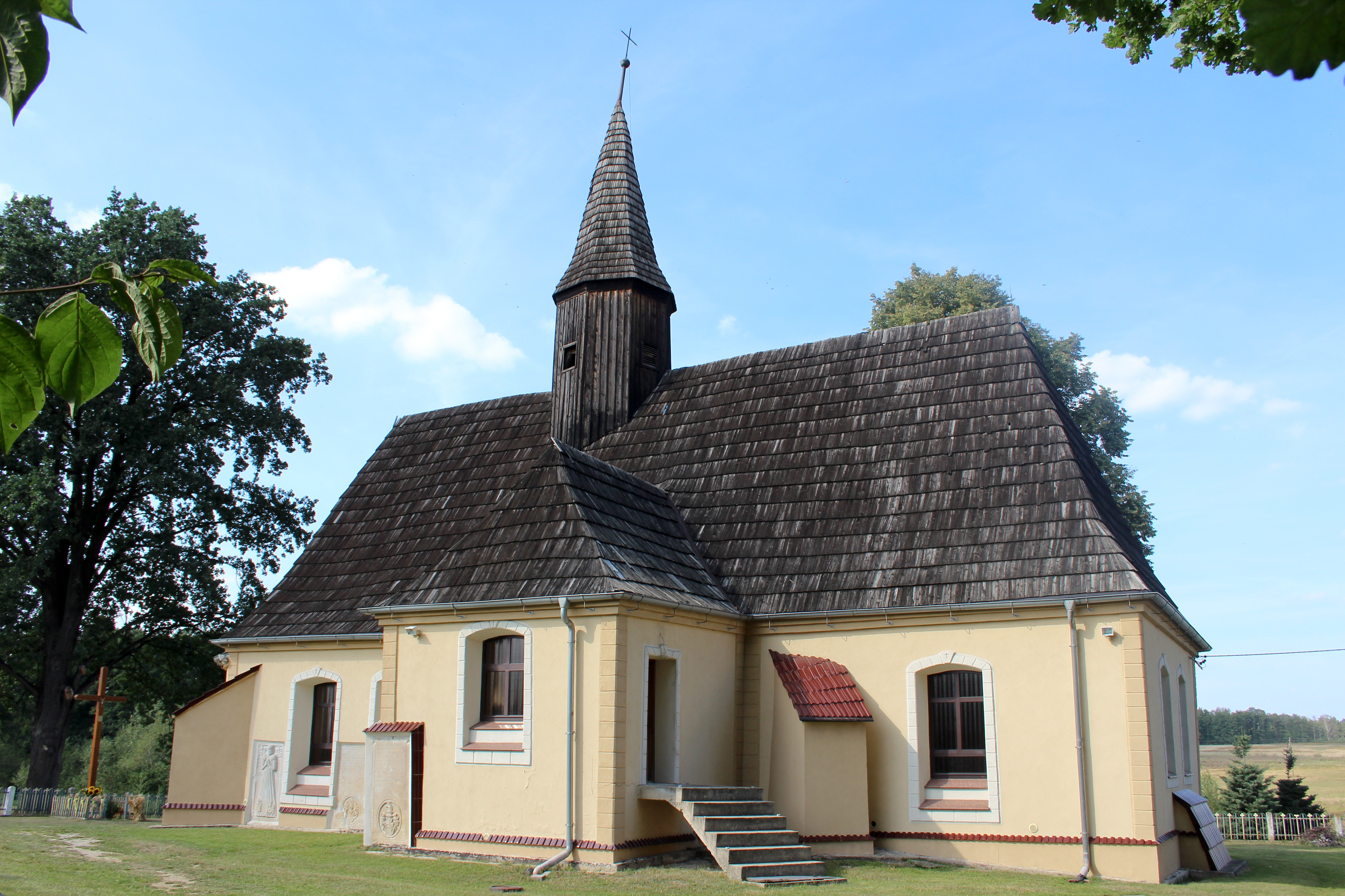
- Saint Anthony of Padua church

- Location within Poland
- Coordinates: 50°42′27″N 17°15′4″E
- Country: Poland
- Voivodeship: Opole
- County: Brzeg
- Gmina: Grodków

Jeszkotle [jɛʂˈkɔtlɛ] (German Jäschkittel) is a village in the administrative district of Gmina Grodków, within Brzeg County, Opole Voivodeship, south-western Poland (Silesia).
