= Balthasar Bickel =

Swiss linguist

Balthasar Bickel (born December 19, 1965 in Flawil) is a Swiss linguist. He combines fieldwork, typology, and evolutionary modelling and uses both experimental and observational methods.

He is currently a professor at the Institute for the Interdisciplinary Study of Language Evolution at the University of Zurich. Between 2002 and 2011, he taught at the Leipzig University in Germany. He received his graduate training at the Max Planck Institute for Psycholinguistics in Nijmegen and earned his doctoral degree from the University of Zurich. As a postdoctoral researcher, he spent several years at the University of California, Berkeley, where he became a close collaborator of Johanna Nichols.

Bickel has made contributions to the study of tense and aspect, grammatical agreement and grammatical relations, morphological typology, phonological word domains, areal typology, linguistic relativity, and to quantitative methods in language typology. He has done extensive fieldwork on a number of Kiranti languages of Nepal, especially Belhare, Chintang and Puma. He is former co-editor of the journal Studies in Language.

Research out of Bickel's lab suggests that with the spread of agriculture and a switch to softer foods, the overbite common among children became more prevalent in adults resulting in an increase in labiodentals such as "f" and "v" in human language.

== Partial bibliography ==
- "Aspect, mood, and time in Belhare." Zürich: ASAS. (1996)
- "On the syntax of agreement in Tibeto-Burman." Studies in Language 24, 583 – 609 (2000)
- Belhare. In Thurgood, G. & R. J. LaPolla (eds.) The Sino-Tibetan languages, 546 – 70. London: Routledge (2003)
- "Referential density in discourse and syntactic typology." Language 79, 708 – 736 (2003)
- (with Johanna Nichols) "Inflectional synthesis of the verb." In Haspelmath, M., M. S. Dryer, D. Gil, & B. Comrie (eds.) The world atlas of language structures, 94 – 97. Oxford: Oxford University Press. (2005/2008) online
- "Typology in the 21st century: major current developments." Linguistic Typology 11, 239 – 251 (2007)
- "Grammatical relations typology." In Song, J. J. (ed.) The Oxford Handbook of Language Typology, pp. 399 – 444, Oxford: Oxford University Press (2011)
