= Feruza Bobokhujaeva =

Uzbekistani footballer

Personal information
- Full name: Feruza Akobur qizi Bobokhujaeva
- Date of birth: 5 October 1999 (age 27)
- Place of birth: Kasby, Uzbekistan
- Position: Forward

Team information
- Current team: Sevinch

Senior career*
Years	Team	Apps	(Gls)
- Sevinch

International career^{‡}
	Uzbekistan U16		(2)
2016–2017	Uzbekistan U19	6	(1)
2018	Uzbekistan	1+	(0)
- * Club domestic league appearances and goals ‡ National team caps and goals as of 9 April 2019

Feruza Bobokhujaeva (Uzbek: Feruza Boboxo‘jayeva; born 5 October 1999) is an Uzbekistani footballer who plays as a forward for Women's Championship club Sevinch. She has been a member of the Uzbekistan women's national team.

== International career ==
Bobokhujaeva capped for Uzbekistan at senior level during the 2018 CAFA Women's Championship.

== See also ==
- List of Uzbekistan women's international footballers
