= Sofia Sakalis =

Australian soccer player

Personal information
- Full name: Sofia Sakalis
- Date of birth: 11 July 2002 (age 24)
- Place of birth: East Melbourne, Australia
- Position: Midfielder

Team information
- Current team: Western Sydney Wanderers
- Number: 8

Senior career*
| Years | Team | Apps | (Gls) |
| 2015–2016 | FV Academy | 28 | (5) |
| 2017–2021 | Melbourne City | 5 | (0) |
| 2018–2021 | South Melbourne | 52 | (20) |
| 2021–2024 | Perth Glory | 49 | (3) |
| 2024–2026 | Melbourne Victory | 28 | (2) |
| 2026– | Western Sydney Wanderers | 0 | (0) |

International career^{‡}
| 2016–2017 | Australia U-17 | 8 | (12) |
| 2018–2022 | Australia U-20 | 2 | (0) |
| 2025– | Australia U-23 | 3 | (0) |
- * Club domestic league appearances and goals as of 21 September 2026 ‡ National team caps and goals as of 19 August 2025

Sofia Sakalis (Greek: Σοφία Σακαλής, pronounced [soˈfi.a sakaˈlis]; born 11 July 2002) is an Australian soccer player who plays for Western Sydney Wanderers in the A-League Women. She has represented Australia in the Australia U-17 and Australia U-20. Sakalis plays the attacking midfielder position.

== Early life ==
Sakalis, who is of Greek-Australian background, showed interest in soccer at the age of three and began playing two years later. When she first started playing, coaches assigned her to teams with boys her age but advanced her to play with older boys. At age 13, her performance at the National Championships earned her call-ups to three training camps with the Junior Matildas, Australia's under-17 national team.

== Club career ==
During 2015 and 2016, she played for Football Victoria Academy (FV Academy) in the National Premier Leagues Victoria Women (NPLV Women) for 28 games and provided 5 goals.

=== Melbourne City, 2017–2021 ===
After training with Melbourne City in 2015–16 W-League (later A-League Women), Sakalis signed with the team for the 2017–18 season at the age of 15. She made her debut for the club during the team's 5–2 win over the Newcastle Jets on 12 November. During the W-League off-seasons she played for South Melbourne FC from 2018 to 2021 appearing 52 times for 20 goals.

=== Perth Glory, 2021–2024 ===
Sofia signed a 2-year deal with Perth Glory ahead of the 2021–22 A-League Women season. In August 2024, Sakalis announced that she had left the club. During the A-League off-seasons for 2022 to 2024, she played 43 matches for Box Hill United (women) in the NPLV Women and kicked 16 goals.

=== Melbourne Victory, 2024–2026 ===
In August 2024, Sakalis joined Melbourne Victory. A year later she was re-signed to the team. In September 2026, Sakalis departed the club at the end of her contract.

=== Western Sydney Wanderers, 2026– ===
In September 2026, Sakalis joined Western Sydney Wanderers.

=== National Premier League ===
Sakalis was awarded Football Victoria's Gold Medal Award for the best player of 2022. From 2016 to 2024 she has played a total of 123 matches for NPLV Women clubs (FV Academy, South Melbourne, Box Hill United).

== International career ==
Sakalis competed with the Junior Matildas at the 2017 AFC U-16 Women's Championship qualification tournament in Vietnam where they finished first in their group with an undefeated record. During the team's first group match against Palestine, Sakalis scored five goals, and scored a total of 11 goals over 5 games. She was the top scorer at the qualifying tournament, helping Australia secure a place at the 2017 AFC U-16 Women's Championship in Thailand.

The midfielder joined the Australia U-23 squad for the 2025 ASEAN Women's Championship in Phú Thọ, Vietnam, in August 2025. Appearing in three of five matches during the tournament, Sakalis helped them reach the final, which they won against two-time champions Myanmar.

== Honours ==
Sakalis was named 2016 Sport Stars of the Year with Olympic boxer Jason Whateley by the Whitehorse Leader.
