= Lindsay J. Whaley =

American linguist

- Education: Calvin College; State University of New York
- Scientific career
- Fields: Linguistics, classics
- Workplaces: Dartmouth College

Lindsay J. Whaley is a professor of linguistics and classics at Dartmouth College

He received his bachelor's degree with honors from Calvin College in 1988. He went on to the State University of New York, where he earned his master's degree (1990) and PhD (1993).

== Bibliography ==
- Whaley, Lindsay J.; Grenoble, Lenore A. (2006). Saving Languages: An Introduction to Language Revitalization. Cambridge University Press. ISBN 978-0-521-81621-2.
- Whaley, Lindsay J. (1997). An Introduction to Language Typology: The Unity and Diversity of Language. SAGE Publications. ISBN 978-0-8039-5963-7.
