= Australia women's national soccer team =

Australia
- Nickname(s): Matildas, Tillies
- Association: Football Australia
- Confederation: OFC (Oceania): 1966–2006; AFC (Asia): 2006–present
- Sub-confederation: AFF (Southeast Asia)
- Head coach: Joe Montemurro
- Captain: Sam Kerr
- Most caps: Emily van Egmond (175)
- Top scorer: Sam Kerr (76)
- Home stadium: Various
- FIFA code: AUS
First colours	Second colours

FIFA ranking
- Current: 15 (20 October 2026)
- Highest: 4 (December 2017 – March 2018)
- Lowest: 16 (October 2003 – June 2004; September 2005; March 2025)

First international
- Thailand 3–2 Australia (Hong Kong; 25 August 1975)

Biggest win
- Australia 21–0 American Samoa (Auckland, New Zealand; 9 October 1998)

Biggest defeat
- United States 9–1 Australia (Ambler, United States; 5 June 1997)

World Cup
- Appearances: 9 (first in 1995)
- Best result: Fourth place (2023)

Olympic Games
- Appearances: 5 (first in 2000)
- Best result: Fourth place (2020)

Asian Cup
- Appearances: 7 (first in 1975)
- Best result: Champions (2010)

Oceanian Cup
- Appearances: 7 (first in 1983)
- Best result: Champions (1994, 1998, 2003)

Southeast Asian Cup
- Appearances: 1 (first in 2008)
- Best result: Champions (2008)
Medal record
OFC Women's Nations Cup
Gold medal – first place	1994 Papua New Guiena
Gold medal – first place	1998 New Zealand
Gold medal – first place	2003 Australia
Silver medal – second place	1983 New Caledonia
Silver medal – second place	1986 New Zealand
Silver medal – second place	1991 Australia
AFC Women's Asian Cup
Gold medal – first place	2010 China	Team
Silver medal – second place	2006 Australia
Silver medal – second place	2014 Vietnam	Team
Silver medal – second place	2018 Jordan	Team
Silver medal – second place	2026 Australia	Team
ASEAN Women's Championship
Gold medal – first place	2008 Vietnam
- Website: matildas.com.au

The Australia women's national soccer team is overseen by Football Australia, the governing body for soccer in Australia, which is a member of the Asian Football Confederation (AFC) and the regional ASEAN Football Federation (AFF) since leaving the Oceania Football Confederation (OFC) in 2006. The team's official nickname is "the Matildas" (from the Australian folk song "Waltzing Matilda"; officially known as the CommBank Matildas for sponsorship reasons); they were known as the "Female Socceroos" before 1995.

Australia is a three-time OFC champion, one-time AFC champion and one-time AFF champion. The team has represented Australia at the FIFA Women's World Cup on eight occasions (once as co-host in 2023) and at the Olympic Games on five, although it has won neither tournament. Their performance in the 2023 World Cup attracted significant nationwide attention and has had an impact on the perception of women's sport in Australia. Joe Montemurro has been coach since June 2025.

== History ==
=== Foundation ===
The Australian Women's Soccer Association (AWSA) was founded in 1974 and a representative Australian team competed at the 1975 AFC Women's Championship, although the team was comprised primarily from a club in New South Wales, St George Budapest, with some debate as to whether a national selection process was ever conducted. This team was officially recognised by Football Australia in May 2023, with all 16 members of the squad officially awarded caps. Pat O’Connor captained this team, and her husband Joe was head coach. After finishing runner-up in their group which featured Thailand and Singapore, the Australians would lose 3–2 in the semi-final against New Zealand. A 5–0 win against Malaysia in the third-place playoff meant that the national team came third in the first Asian Cup.

A national team made up primarily of players from New South Wales and Western Australia was sent to the 1978 inaugural Women's World Invitational Tournament, in Taipei, Taiwan. Australia, coached by Jim Selby, played against club teams at the tournament and none of the players' appearances counted as official caps. Prior to May 2023, Australia's first official international match was considered to be against New Zealand at Seymour Shaw Park in Miranda, New South Wales, Australia on 6 October 1979, as it was billed as the "1st Australian Women's International Soccer Test". Jim Selby remained as coach. A lack of resources meant Australia's subsequent seven official matches were all against New Zealand.

=== The 1980s: Development in Oceania ===
Australia played in the first Oceania Cup in 1983 in New Caledonia, losing the final to New Zealand in extra time. It was the first time the Australians faced a team other than the "Football Ferns" of New Zealand. A team would not be assembled again until the next edition of the tournament in 1986 tournament in New Zealand, which featured Australia, New Zealand and Taiwan, as well as New Zealand's B team. Australia lost in the final again, beaten 4–1 by Taiwan.

Throughout the 1980s, the team did not have an official playing kit of its own. The only playing kits available were hand-me-downs that had been donated or discarded by men's teams. Although the players were proud to be wearing an Australian strip, they were never supplied with a kit that fitted them properly. Moreover, on the eve of one international tour, several players famously had to sew the team crest onto their tracksuit jackets with a needle and thread.

The late 1980s had Australia encountering the American and European teams for the first time in the 1987 Women's World Invitational Tournament in Taiwan, and the 1988 FIFA Women's Invitation Tournament in China. For the latter tournament, the players had to sew themselves their own Australian crests onto the team tracksuits. Two years later, Australia hosted the 1989 Oceania Cup in Brisbane with Australia entering two teams: Australia A and Australia B. After originally being separated in two groups, neither team made it to the final with Chinese Taipei defeating both Australia B and Australia A to force the Australians to take on each other for the third-place play-off, which was rained out and abandoned.

=== The 1990s: Continued growth, first Sermanni era ===
The national team played no matches in 1990, 1992 or 1993. The 1991 OFC Women's Championship tournament doubled as qualifiers for the 1991 FIFA Women's World Cup, and the winner was determined by the best results from a group. Australia finished level on points with New Zealand, but had a lower goal difference, which resulted in New Zealand progressing to the World Cup as OFC's representative. Football Australia established the Australia women's national under-20 soccer team in the early 1990s. Initially they were organised as an under-19 team, but changed to under-20 (nicknamed Young Matildas) in 2006.

Scottish-born former professional soccer player and Sydney Olympic FC's coach Tom Sermanni was appointed as coach of the Australian women's national soccer team in July 1994. His team played internationally on a tour of Russia in August 1994. The Oceania tournament in 1994 again doubled as World Cup qualifiers in the same round-robin format. Again, Australia finished even with New Zealand on points but this time had a superior goal difference and qualified for their first FIFA Women's World Cup.

Before 1995, the nickname for the women's team was just "Female Socceroos", derivative of the male squad. Thus in 1995 the Australian Women's Soccer Association joined with Special Broadcasting Service to broadcast a naming competition for the female team. Out of five names, the popular vote chose "Matildas", from the song "Waltzing Matilda". The players themselves did not approve of the name, and took years to use the moniker to describe the team.

At the 1995 FIFA Women's World Cup in Sweden, Australia were grouped with the United States, China and Denmark. During their opening match against Denmark, they lost 5–0. During the team's second match, a 4–2 loss to China, Angela Iannotta scored Australia's first goal at a World Cup. In the final group match against cup holders the United States, Australia scored first but went on to lose 4–1.

In 1996, the team entered into its first kit sponsorship deal, with rising sportswear brand Asics. The deal was initiated during a chance conversation between team manager Sermanni, the CEO of the AWSA, Peter Hugg, and an Asics' representative, Lawrie McKinna, who had become a fan of women's football due to his acquaintance with former team member Janine McPhee. Asics and team management jointly developed the design of the first sponsored strip; it incorporated new technology that made it lighter and more comfortable for the players than their previous kit. In November 1997 Sermanni left to join Sanfrecce Hiroshima as assistant coach, he was replaced by Greg Brown as the Matildas head coach.

The Matildas would assert their Continental strength at the 1998 Oceania Cup, which doubled as a World Cup qualifying tournament. Australia thrashed their Pacific island opposition in their group games and semi-final, before defeating hosts New Zealand in the final 3–1 (the only goal conceded for the tournament), and qualifying for the 1999 FIFA Women's World Cup in USA. At the tournament, Australia was grouped with Sweden, China and Ghana. In their opening match, they secured their first non-loss in a World Cup match with a 1–1 draw against the Ghanaians. Their following group matches were both 3–1 losses, finishing third in the group.

Australia still did not have much attention and respect, with the Matildas forced to train with second-hand equipment from the Socceroos, not getting paid and with few games to play. In 1999, to promote themselves and raise funds for the team, most of the Matildas posed for an AWSA board-approved nude calendar, which sold over 40,000 units.

=== 2000–2004: First Olympics appearances ===
The profile built for the sport carried into 2000, where the Matildas had a guaranteed spot for the 2000 Olympics in Sydney as host nation. In their Olympic debut, they would be facing the top seven placed teams from the previous year's Women's World Cup (which back then doubled as the Olympic qualifiers). While in January a friendly match against the Czech Republic in Melbourne's Bob Jane Stadium attracted only 1,500 spectators, a crowd of 10,000 came to the Matildas' game against China at the Sydney Football Stadium in June. Much anticipation surrounded the team's Olympic performance on home soil. Australia started strongly against the formidable Germany, but in the end went down 3–0. Next up was a gutsy performance against Sweden, the Aussie defence soaking up immense pressure. Australia took the lead only to share the points from a controversial Sweden penalty. The draw lifted Australia's hopes of still advancing into the semifinals, which they could achieve with a third-match win. A brilliant performance and a wonder goal by Sunni Hughes gave Australia the first half lead against Brazil, but two errors allowed Brazil to claim victory 2–1, quickly dissolving Australia's dreams. The legacy of a home Olympics featuring the best in the world further raised the profile of women's soccer in Australia.

The team were the host nation for an annual invitational tournament called the Australia Cup, from 1999 to 2004 inclusive, winning it twice. Following the 2000 Olympics, many problems halted the Matildas' schedules. As Ernie Merrick backed out on his intentions to coach the team, Adrian Santrac only took over as manager in November, and Australia played no games in 2001. The following year the team argued over the calendar proceeds with the promoter, and AWSA went into liquidation with debts of over $70,000; all of its other assets were absorbed by Soccer Australia (current Football Federation Australia). In-between, many players opted to retire from the national team. Matilda defender Anissa Tann became the first Australian soccer player (male or female) to reach 100 caps when she appeared in the U.S. Cup match against hosts, United States in October 2002.

In 2003, they competed in the Oceania Cup with the team winning all four matches to the combined score of 45 goals to nil with the closest being a 2–0 win over New Zealand. Qualifying for the 2003 FIFA Women's World Cup, the Australians were drawn in Group D with China, Ghana and Russia, the Australians only scored a single point at the World Cup with a 1–1 draw against China. Though two losses against Russia and Ghana meant that they finished bottom of the group. The team won the 2004 OFC Women's Olympic Qualifying Tournament in Fiji to return to Olympic tournament in Athens 2004. The Matildas won their first Olympic game ever against Greece, and managed to qualify for the quarterfinals, losing to Sweden 2–1.

=== 2004–2013: Second Sermanni era ===
==== 2004–2009: Matildas move to Asia ====
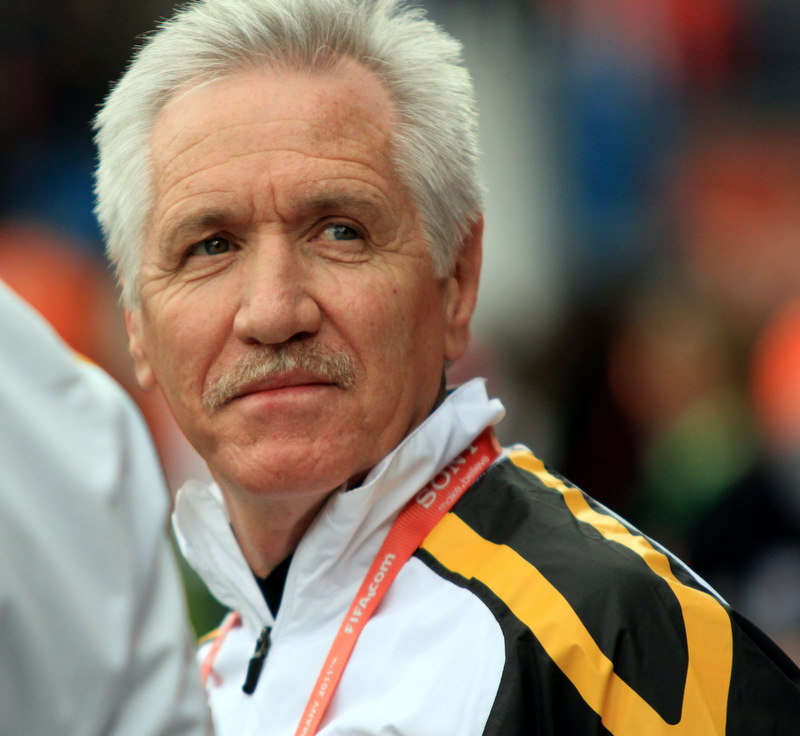
Tom Sermanni, Australia's longest-serving coach, (1994–1997, 2005–2012, 2024–2025 [interim]). Overall he coached them for 151 games.

Tom Sermanni was re-appointed coach of Australian women's team in December 2004, he had previously coached them between 1994 and 1997. In 2006, Australia moved from the Oceania Football Confederation to the Asian Football Confederation, with the following month seeing the country getting hosting rights for the 2006 AFC Women's Asian Cup. The Australians were drawn in Group B with Myanmar, North Korea, South Korea and Thailand. During the group stage, the Matildas scored eleven goals, which included a 4–0 win against South Korea and finished in second place in the group by goal difference.

In the semi-final, goals from Caitlin Munoz and Joanne Peters gave Australia a 2–0 win over tournament favourites Japan. This win also meant that the national team qualified through to the 2007 FIFA Women's World Cup which was held in China. The Matildas lost in the final via a penalty shoot-out against China after the Chinese came back from two goals down at half time.

During early 2007, Australia competed in the qualifiers for the 2008 Olympics, which were held in China. After sweeping their group with nine points from nine, the Australians finished second in the final round group behind North Korea winning both matches against each other by a score of 2–0.

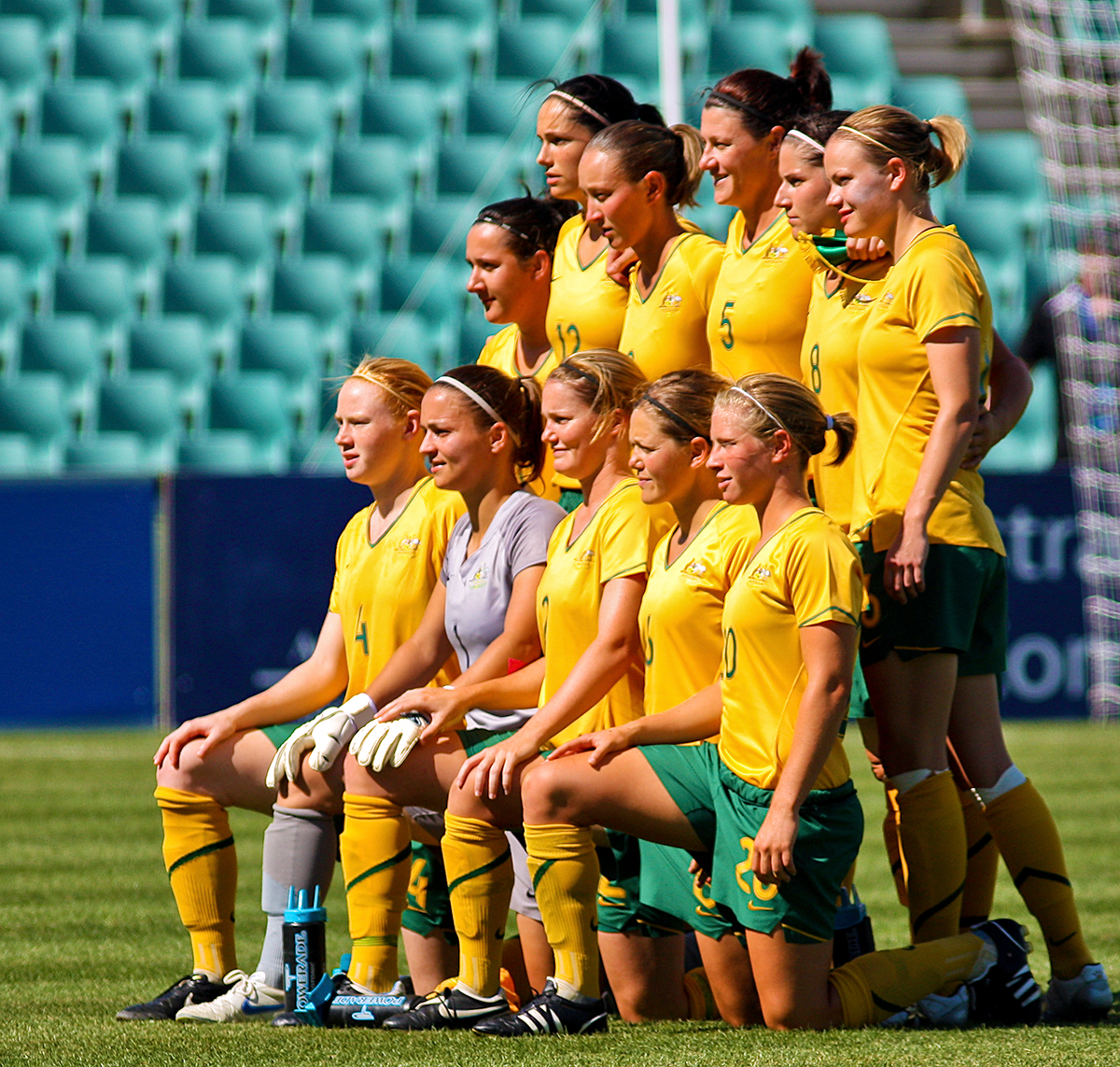
The Matildas before a game against Italy in 2009

Two months later, Australia's draw for the World Cup was revealed with the nation placed in Group C with Canada, Ghana and Norway. The opening match of the 2007 World Cup saw Australia record their first victory in a World Cup with two goals from Lisa De Vanna, who assisted Australia to a 4–1 victory over Ghana in Hangzhou. This was followed up with two draws against Norway (1–1) and Canada (2–2) with a late goal from Cheryl Salisbury ensuring Australia's spot in the quarter finals for the first time in the team's history. In the knock-out stage, the Australians came back from two goals down early in the first half to level the match at two-all with goals from De Vanna and Lauren Colthorpe. But a 75th-minute goal from Brazilian striker, Cristiane gave Brazil a 3–2 win which ended the Matildas' World Cup run at the quarter-final stage.

In 2008, the Matildas competed in the 2008 AFC Women's Asian Cup. They were drawn in Group B, placing second in the group behind Japan, who they faced in the third place play-off. With the Matildas progressing from the group stage to the semi-finals, they were matched up against North Korea. North Korea won the game 3–0 and went on to win the tournament. This led Australia to the third place play-off, facing Japan for a second time in the tournament and again losing, leaving the Matildas in fourth place.

==== 2010 AFC Women's Asian Cup, China ====
External videos
- Aussies Abroad: The Matildas (ESPN)

In 2010, the Matildas qualified for the 2010 AFC Women's Asian Cup in China. They beat Vietnam (2–0) and South Korea (3–1) before losing to China 1–0 which put them in second place in their group. They advanced to the semi-finals where they beat Japan 1–0. The final was the first time a senior soccer team (men or women) reached the final in the AFC. They created history by being the first ever Australian soccer team to win the Asian Cup after beating the team of Korea DPR in penalties during the final, 5–4, after a regular time score of 1–1 (Australia's lone and equalising goal was scored by Sam Kerr). The title gave the Matildas a berth at the 2011 FIFA Women's World Cup in Germany.

==== 2011 FIFA Women's World Cup, Germany ====
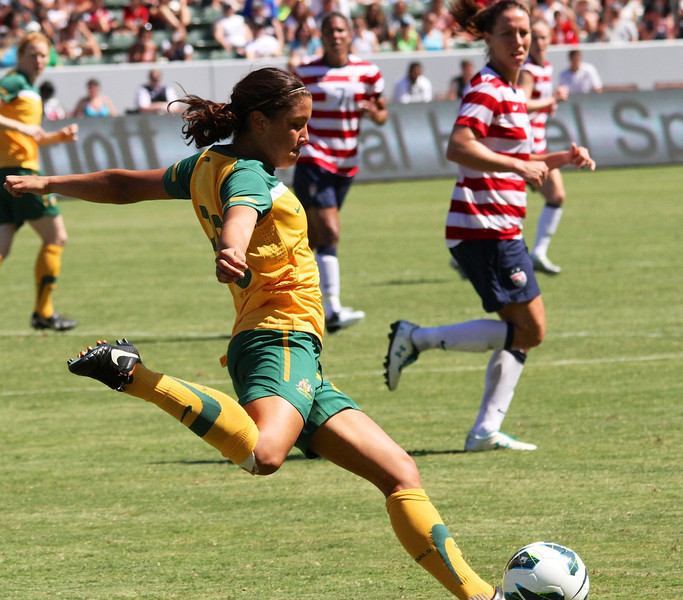
Australia playing the United States in 2012

The following year the team contested the 2011 FIFA Women's World Cup, held in Germany, being sorted into Group D. Despite losing 1–0 to Brazil in the opening game, victories of 3–2 and 2–1 over Equatorial Guinea and Norway respectively qualified the Matildas to the quarterfinals. At the knockout stage, the team lost 3–1 to Sweden. Caitlin Foord was awarded Best Young Player of the tournament, and defender Elise Kellond-Knight was chosen for the All-Star Team.

==== 2012–2013: Sermanni departs ====
In October 2012, after a total of 11 years as team manager, Tom Sermanni was announced as head coach of the United States women's national team, starting in January 2013. Prior to his leaving, the Australian team took part in the 2013 East Asian Cup preliminary round 2, held in China in November 2012. They defeated Chinese Taipei 7–0 and Hong Kong 4–0 before losing to hosts, China 2–1. Kate Gill, with four goals, was the round's top scorer. However, with China winning all three of its games, the Matildas did not proceed to the final round. Soon after Dutch-born Hesterine de Reus was appointed head coach of the Australians. In June 2013 they won the Centenary Cup against New Zealand in a penalty shoot-out (4–2) after 1–1 draw at full-time.

=== 2014–2019: Stajcic era ===
Coach Hesterine de Reus was fired by Football Federation Australia in April 2014, after players complained about her coaching style. Alen Stajcic was appointed permanent head coach of the squad in late 2014 after operating as interim coach in late April and May 2014, in preparation for the Matildas’ Asian Cup campaign.

==== 2014 AFC Women's Asian Cup, Vietnam ====
As reigning champions, the Matildas qualified for the 2014 AFC Women's Asian Cup, which was held in Vietnam in May. They were drawn into Group A, alongside Japan, Vietnam and Jordan. With two victories and a draw against Japan they finished second placed on goal difference. Australia played against South Korea in a semi-final, defeating them 2–1, but lost 1–0 to Japan in the final.

==== 2015 FIFA Women's World Cup, Canada ====
The Matildas were drawn in the "group of death" for the 2015 FIFA Women's World Cup, held in Canada during June–July, sharing Group D with USA, Sweden and Nigeria. After first losing to USA 1–3, they came back into contention with a 2–0 defeat of Nigeria. The crunch last game against Sweden resulted in a 1–1 draw, with both goals scored in the first 15 minutes of the game. Sweden had needed to win as the Matildas only needed to draw under the three points for a win system (whereas Australia would have tied with Sweden under two points for a win system).

They became the first Australian team, women's or men's, to win a knockout stage match at a World Cup when they defeated Brazil by a score of 1–0. The goal was scored by Kyah Simon after a shot by Lisa de Vanna was blocked and redirected by Brazilian goalkeeper Luciana. In the quarterfinals, the Matildas lost the all-Asian quarterfinal match to defending champions Japan in a late goal by Mana Iwabuchi. The Matildas finished in seventh position overall. The tournament included the last appearance by former Matildas captain and goalkeeper, Melissa Barbieri, who retired after 84 games and a record 34 clean sheets.

==== 2016 Olympic Games, Rio ====
In the following year, they contested in qualifiers for the 2016 Summer Olympics where they finished on top of their group after defeating all their opponents bar China, to get to the Olympic Games. Place into Group F, Australia lost to Canada, had a draw with Germany and defeated Zimbabwe in a 6–1 scoreline to finish as the best third placed team. Their adversary in the quarterfinals were hosts Brazil, who avenged their defeat a year earlier. The 0–0 scoreline after extra-time resulted in a penalty shootout 7–6, with Brazilian goalkeeper Bárbara saving Alanna Kennedy's kick.

==== Post 2016 Olympics ====
At the 2017 Tournament of Nations event, the Matildas recorded their first ever win over the United States after 27 attempts, defeating them 1–0 in Seattle. The Matildas went on to defeat Japan 4–2 and Brazil 6–1 to finish as the inaugural tournament as champions.

Following the Tournament of Nations, the Matildas scheduled a set of two friendlies in September 2017 hosting Brazil, with the first match at Penrith Stadium sold-out, which Australia won 2–1. An even larger crowd of nearly 17,000 attended the next match three days later in Newcastle – the Matildas won 3–2. In December 2017, Matildas were awarded the Public Choice Team of the Year at the Australian Institute of Sport Awards. Their striker Sam Kerr was awarded 2017 Sports Personality of the Year. As a result of the team's performances they were placed at No. 4 in FIFA Women's World Ranking from December 2017 – March 2018 – their highest ever position.

==== 2018 AFC Women's Asian Cup, Jordan ====
At the 2018 AFC Asian Cup, held in Jordan in April, Australia qualified automatically due to their runner-up status in the 2014 tournament. They were assigned to Group B with Japan, South Korea and Vietnam. Their 0–8 win against Vietnam and two draws placed them at the top of their group, on goal difference. The Matildas reached the final after defeating Thailand in the semi-final in a penalty shoot-out, 3–1. The Australians lost again 1–0 to Japan in the final, but nonetheless qualified for the 2019 FIFA Women's World Cup.

==== Post 2018 Asian Cup ====
During July–August in that year at the 2018 Tournament of Nations Australia were once again undefeated, finishing the tournament with two wins (1–3 against Brazil, 2–0 against Japan) and one draw (1–1 with United States). They were tied with the United States at 7 points, but the US had a superior goal differential and were crowned tournament champions.

Despite entering 2019 on the back of good form and their FIFA rating at No. 6, the Matildas' coach Alen Stajcic was sacked in January by Football Federation Australia (FFA). FFA's chief executive David Gallop said the decision was based on confidential surveys and conversations with players and staff. The decision was considered controversial, as the FFA refused to supply further specifics as to the reasoning for their decision, which was made months out from a World Cup appearance. Players, Sam Kerr, Lydia Williams, Elise Kellond-Knight and Clare Polkinghorne spoke in support of Stajcic and voiced their surprise at his sacking.

=== 2019–2020: Milicic era ===
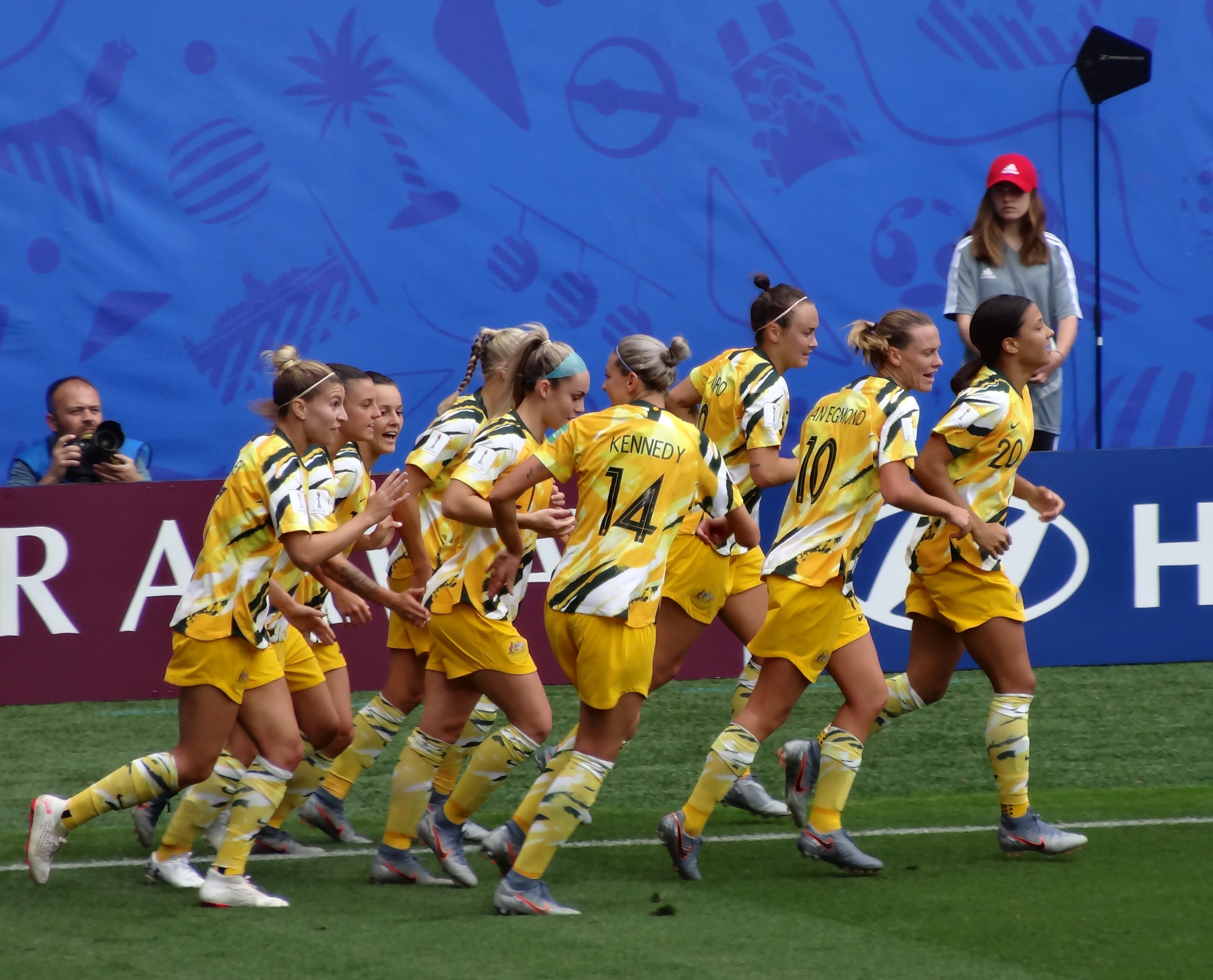
Australia during the Women's World Cup 2019

Former Australian men's national team assistant coach Ante Milicic was appointed Matildas coach in February 2019. Australian hosted the invitational Cup of Nations in February–March with visitors from New Zealand, South Korea and Argentina; they won all three games (2–0, 4–1, 3–0) – finishing first.

==== 2019 FIFA Women's World Cup, France ====
For the 2019 FIFA Women's World Cup, held in France, Australia qualified due to being 2018 AFC Cup runner-up. They were drawn in Group C with Italy, Brazil, and Jamaica. A 2–1 injury time loss to Italy was followed by a 3–2 win against Brazil. This victory was notable for three reasons – (i) Australia came back from a 2–0 deficit, (ii) the three goals were the first ones conceded by Brazil in the group stage in 16 years and (iii) it was Brazil's first group stage loss for 24 years. The game against the Brazilians is referred to as the "Miracle of Montpellier".

Australia's final group game was a 4–1 win over Jamaica with Sam Kerr scoring all four goals, becoming the first Australian player — male or female — to score a hat trick at a World Cup tournament. The result had Australia finish second in their group and played Norway in the round of sixteen. That game finished one-all after both regulation time and extra time with Norway winning the resulting penalty shoot-out 4–1.

=== 2020–2024: Gustavsson era ===
In September 2020, Football Federation Australia named Swede and former United States Women's National Soccer Team assistant coach Tony Gustavsson as the Matildas' new head coach, signing him on a deal running through 2024 (up to and including the 2024 Olympics in Paris).

First kit used in Olympic Tokyo 2020 Women Football
Second kit used in Olympic Tokyo 2020 Women Football

==== 2020 Olympic Games, Tokyo ====
In 2020, the Matildas qualified for the delayed 2020 Summer Olympics where they finished top of all competing nations during the 2020 Asian Football Confederation's Qualifying Tournament. They were placed in Group G with Sweden, United States and New Zealand, nicknamed the "Group of Death". The Olympics were postponed to July–August 2021 due to the impact of the COVID-19 pandemic. After beating New Zealand (2–1), losing to Sweden (4–2) and drawing with the United States (0–0), they were ranked third in their group and progressed to the quarter finals against Great Britain. During that match Australia scored the first goal, Great Britain replied with two goals from Ellen White in the second half. An equalising goal by captain Sam Kerr led to extra time. Mary Fowler and Kerr each scored a goal, before White completed her hat trick. The game ended with a 4–3 win for the Matildas, resulting in Australia's first entry into an Olympic semi-final.

In the semi-final Australian played against Sweden for the second time in the tournament. Despite a strong performance and a disallowed goal by Kerr, they lost 1–0, relegating them to a bronze medal match play-off against the United States. The semi-final match against Sweden broke women's sport TV viewing records in Australia, with 2.32 million viewers tuning in. In the bronze medal match, they lost 4–3 to the United States, resulting in the Matildas' seventh loss of the year. Finishing fourth, the 2020 Olympics were the Matildas' most successful performance at the Olympics, having previously never progressed beyond the quarter-finals since the sport's first inclusion, at the 1996 Olympics.

==== Post 2020 Olympics ====
After their Olympics bronze medal defeat, Australia played their first ever match against the Republic of Ireland on 21 September 2021, with it being Sam Kerr's 100th cap. Playing in Dublin, Australia lost 3–2. In October, they played a pair of home friendlies against Brazil, their first matches on home soil since 2019, recording a 3–1 win and a 2–2 draw. In November, in their final matches of the 2021 calendar year, they played another set of home friendlies against World Number On side the United States, recording a 0–3 defeat and a 1–1 draw. These two matches broke attendance records in Australia – the first match played on 27 November in Stadium Australia, Sydney, broke the all-time standalone Matildas' home attendance record set in 2000, with 36,109 spectators. The second game broke the attendance record of any Matildas game played at Newcastle, with 20,495 spectators. 2021 also saw a record number of Matildas' debutantes, with 13 players making their first senior international caps, and a record number of players reaching their 100th cap milestones, including Emily Van Egmond, Kyah Simon, Sam Kerr, Alanna Kennedy and Tameka Yallop.

==== 2022 AFC Women's Asian Cup, India ====
The Matildas began 2022 by participating in the 2022 AFC Women's Asian Cup, held in India. They were drawn into Group B, against Indonesia, Philippines and Thailand. They played their opening match against Indonesia, beating them 18–0, a record win for the team against any opponent within the Asian confederation. The game also saw Sam Kerr scoring five goals, whereby surpassing Tim Cahill's previous Australian international goal-scoring record total of 50 goals. This made Kerr the all-time leading scorer for Australia, both male or female. Australia finished top in their group undefeated, conceding just one solitary goal, however the team crashed out in their quarter-final match to eventual runners-up South Korea 0–1 due to a long-shooting goal of Ji So-yun.

==== 2023 FIFA Women's World Cup ====
Australia co-hosted the 2023 FIFA Women's World Cup along with New Zealand, after the bidding decision was announced on 25 June 2020. As hosts, Australia automatically qualified and were drawn into Group B, which also contained Canada, Nigeria and debutante Ireland.

Before the World Cup tournament, Australia participated in the 2023 Cup of Nations alongside Spain, Jamaica and the Czech Republic. Australia defeated Czech Republic 4–0 in their opening game and Spain 3–2 in their second game; they only needing a draw in their final game against Jamaica to win the tournament. Australia beat Jamaica 3–0 to lift the Cup of Nations on 22 February 2023.

Australia started the 2023 World Cup in July with a tense 1–0 victory over Ireland by Stephanie Catley, with the only goal scored from a penalty kick. Part of this tension was due to the news that captain Sam Kerr was likely to miss the first two if not all of their group games due to a calf injury. Australia had a 3–2 loss against Nigeria. In danger of elimination, they defeated reigning Olympic champion Canada 4–0. Not only was this Australia's biggest ever win at a World Cup match, Australia topped their group at a World Cup for the first time.

In the Round of 16, Australia defeated Denmark 2–0 with a goal in each half. It also marked Kerr's first appearance in the tournament. This was the second time Australia won a knock-out match at the Women's World Cup. Australia defeated France 7–6 in a penalty shoot-out, with the Matildas becoming the first senior Australian team to make a world cup semi-final. The quarter-final match between Australia and France also had the longest penalty shoot-out in the history of the FIFA Women's World Cup, with 20 total kicks.

The Matildas were defeated 3–1 by England in the semi-final on 16 August. Their campaign ended with a 2–0 loss to Sweden to finish fourth. This marked the highest-ever finish of any Australian soccer team in senior level.

==== 2024 Olympic Games, Paris ====
Australia had a bye for the first round of the 2024 AFC Women's Olympic Qualifying Tournament due to their FIFA ranking. For the second round they played three matches in Perth against Iran, Philippines, and Chinese Taipei, with Australian winning 2–0, 8–0, and 3–0, respectively. They proceeded to the third round to play a pair of home and away games against Uzbekistan, winning both games (aggregate of 13–0) and qualifying for the Olympics. For the Olympic Tournament, Australia were assigned to Group B with Germany, Zambia, and United States, they played their group matches from 25 to 31 July 2024. With defeats by Germany and United States and a poor goal difference, the Matildas did not progress from the Group stage.

=== 2024–2025: Third Sermanni era ===
On 1 August 2024, it was confirmed that Gustavsson's role as head coach would not be extended, following Australia's early exit from the Olympic Games which was to be the end of his contract. On 17 September, former Matildas' coach Tom Sermanni was appointed interim coach. Football Australia's James Johnson announced six friendlies against four international teams: Switzerland, Germany, Brazil (two home games) and Chinese Taipei (two home games) from late October to early December. Matildas won their game against Germany, 1–2, their first victory against them since 2005. Both Australian goals were first-time scores for Kyra Cooney-Cross and Clare Hunt. The team lost both games against Brazil (3–1, 2–1), those friendlies against Brazil were sold out, extending the Matildas' sellout streak to 16 home games. Matildas won both games against Chinese Taipei (3–1, 6–0), with Australian first time goals by Bryleeh Henry, Leah Davidson, Natasha Prior and Sharn Freier. The second friendly against Chinese Taipei was Clare Polkinghorne's 169th and last for Australia signifying her retirement from playing.

In late February 2025 the Matildas participated for their first time in the invitational SheBelieves Cup against the hosts United States and fellow visitors Colombia and Japan. They lost all three games to finish last of the four teams. Sermani observed "There are things to take away [from the SheBelieves Cup], but things to be asked by myself as head coach, but also by the players... Because ultimately, as a country, we've got to step up and start doing better at this level." In May 2025 he coached the Matildas for his 150th game in their 2–0 defeat of Argentina in a friendly in Melbourne. Sermanni's 151st and last game as coach was the second match against Argentina, which was held on 2 June in Canberra. Matildas won 4–1 including a brace by Amy Sayer.

=== 2025–present: Joe Montemurro era ===
On 2 June 2025, Australian-born Joe Montemurro was officially announced as the new permanent head coach following a one-year stint at OL Lyonnes. He had previously coached women's teams at Arsenal, Juventus and Melbourne City. On 24 May 2024 he had coached A-Leagues All Stars Women in a friendly 0–1 loss against Women's Super League team, Arsenal, held in Melbourne. Both sides had current Matildas. During the latter half of 2025, Montemurro coached them for eight friendly matches, they won five games (including 5–0 against New Zealand) and lost two (including 0–3 against England).

==== 2026 AFC Women's Asian Cup, Australia ====
Under Montemurro the Matildas adopted a possession-based strategy, in preparation for Australia hosting the 2026 Asian Cup in March. As hosts, Australia automatically qualified for the Asian Cup and were placed in Group A where they faced Philippines (1–0), Iran (4–0) and South Korea (3–3). In the knockout stage they defeated North Korea (2–1) and then defending champions China (2–1) before losing to Japan (0–1) in the final on 21 March. Alanna Kennedy, who switched from defender to attacking midfielder, kicked five goals across the tournament and was named Most Valuable Player of the championship.

The 2026 Asian Cup was also the beginning of AFC's qualification process for the 2027 FIFA Women's World Cup to be held in Brazil from 24 June to 25 July. Australia was the first AFC team, which qualified directly for the World Cup when they won their quarter-final against North Korea.

== Team image ==
Regarded as Australia's most beloved national sporting team in 2019, the Matildas have grown its fanbase over recent years, due to increased exposure, successful tournaments and skilled players coming on to play both internationally and at club level, including captain Sam Kerr, widely regarded as one of the world's best soccer players. In November 2023, the Australian National Dictionary Centre announced "Matilda" as the 2023 Word of the Year, following the team's successful World Cup campaign that year which attracted unprecedented nationwide attention– media outlets used the term Matildas fever to describe the positive atmosphere.

=== Kits ===
As is traditional with national Australian sporting teams, the Matildas wear a combination of green and gold as their "home" colours, the national colours of Australia. The kit has been manufactured by Nike since 2004, in partnership with Football Australia (formerly Football Federation Australia). Nike began producing specific women's national team kits starting from the 2019 FIFA Women's World Cup. The Matildas had their own kit until 2025, when Nike and Football Australia announced a new kit for both the men's and women's teams.

The most recent home kit worn at the 2023 FIFA Women's World Cup features a gold top with a marbled pattern and green trimming, and green shorts with white socks, the press release stating that it "celebrates the country's iconic Outback and beaches". The away kit features a bright blue top, shorts and socks, with a darker blue and yellow trims said to "celebrate the country's natural wonders" and drawing "inspiration from the vivid sea".

At the world cup, it was reported that the 2023 kit outsold the 2019 edition 13 to one, and sold more than the Socceroos kits during their entire 2022 FIFA World Cup campaign before the 2023 Women's World Cup even started.

During the Olympics only, the team wears kits manufactured by Asics as the teamwear supplier for the Australian Olympic Committee.

=== Nicknames ===
The team's official nickname is "the Matildas" (from the Australian folk song "Waltzing Matilda"), sometimes shortened to Tillies by fans. They were known as the "Female Socceroos" or "Soccerettes" before 1995.

=== Naming rights ===
In the early 2000s the team were known as "Qantas Matildas". Under a naming rights deal with Scentre Group and its predecessor, Westfield Group, the team was branded as "Westfield Matildas" from 2008 to 2021. After 2021 the team was re-branded as "CommBank Matildas", based on a multi-year deal with the Commonwealth Bank.

=== Media coverage ===
Australian matches (including finals tournament of the 2027 FIFA Women's World Cup but excluding Olympic Games (until 2032)) are broadcast by Paramount+ and on free-to-air by Network 10. In 2021, during the broadcast of the Tokyo 2020 Olympics, the Matildas broke TV viewing records of any women's team sport in history. The record was initially broken during their second group stage match against Sweden, drawing in 1,468,000 viewers. The record was broken again during their quarter-final clash against Great Britain, drawing in 2.27 million viewers, before recording the all-time record of 2.32 million viewers watching them compete against Sweden in the Olympic semi-final.

In the 2023 Women's World Cup, the Quarterfinal game between Australia and France averaged over 4 million viewers and peaked at 7.2 million viewers on Channel 7, which was the most watched sporting event since Cathy Freeman's 400 meters gold medal in the Sydney 2000 Olympics in Australia. However, the semi-final against England is the most-watched broadcast in Australian history, averaging 7.13 million viewers, with a peak of 11.15 million watching. This statistic does not include live viewings, pubs, stadiums and parties where the game was shown.

From 2024 until 2032, Matildas matches during Summer Olympics finals tournament will be aired live on free-to-air Nine Network and Nine's subscription streaming via Stan.

=== Attendance ===
The home attendance record for a Matildas' stand-alone match is 76,798 at Stadium Australia, Sydney, set on 3 June 2024 during 2–0 win in their friendly match against China.

=== Supporters ===
The main supporter group of the Australian women's national team is Matildas Active Support .

== Results and fixtures ==
The following is a list of match results in the last 12 months, as well as any future matches that have been scheduled.

Legend

Win Draw Loss Fixture

=== 2025 ===
28 November Friendly	Australia	5–0	New Zealand	Gosford, Australia
19:30 UTC+11	Sayer 13'; Raso 24'; Carpenter 70'; Cooney-Cross 71'; Gorry 90+2'	Report		Stadium: polytec Stadium; Attendance: 20,519; Referee: Kim Yu-jeong (South Korea)

2 December Friendly	Australia	2–0	New Zealand	Adelaide, Australia
20:00 UTC+10:30	Kennedy 19'; Raso 70'	Report		Stadium: Coopers Stadium; Attendance: 15,097; Referee: Hong Yu (China)

=== 2026 ===
1 March 2026 Asian Cup GS	Australia	1–0	Philippines	Perth, Australia
17:00 UTC+8	Kerr 14'	Report		Stadium: Perth Stadium; Attendance: 44,379; Referee: Dong Fangyu (China)

5 March 2026 Asian Cup GS	Iran	0–4	Australia	Gold Coast, Australia
19:00 UTC+10		Report	Sayer 8'; Fowler 27'; Kennedy 35', 58'	Stadium: Gold Coast Stadium; Attendance: 22,398; Referee: Asaka Koizumi (Japan)

8 March 2026 Asian Cup GS	Australia	3–3	South Korea	Sydney, Australia
20:00 UTC+11	Kennedy 32', 90+8'; Kerr 45+6'	Report	Mun Eun-ju 13'; Kim Shin-ji 53' (pen.); Kang Chae-rim 56'	Stadium: Stadium Australia; Attendance: 60,279; Referee: Yoshimi Yamashita (Japan)

13 March 2026 Asian Cup QF	Australia	2–1	North Korea	Perth, Australia
18:00 UTC+8	Kennedy 9'; Kerr 47'	Report	Chae Un-yong 65'	Stadium: Perth Rectangular Stadium; Attendance: 16,466; Referee: Veronika Bernatskaia (Kyrgyzstan)

17 March 2026 Asian Cup SF	China	1–2	Australia	Perth, Australia
18:00 UTC+8	Zhang Linyan 26' (pen.)	Report	Foord 17'; Kerr 58'	Stadium: Perth Stadium; Attendance: 35,170; Referee: Supiree Testhomya (Thailand)

21 March 2026 Asian Cup Final	Japan	1–0	Australia	Sydney, Australia
20:00 UTC+11	Hamano 17'	Report		Stadium: Stadium Australia; Attendance: 74,397; Referee: Kim Yu-jeong (South Korea)

11 April 2026 FIFA Series	Australia	5–0	Malawi	Nairobi, Kenya
14:00 UTC+3	van Egmond 5'; Kerr 41'; Chidiac 60'; McNamara 86'; McKenna 90+4'	Report		Stadium: Nyayo National Stadium; Referee: Emmanuela Clement (South Sudan)

15 April 2026 FIFA Series	Kenya	0–2	Australia	Nairobi, Kenya
17:30 UTC+3		Report	Kerr 25'; Wheeler 54'	Stadium: Nyayo National Stadium; Referee: Yordanos Mulugeta (Ethiopia)

6 June Friendly	Australia	0–1	Mexico	Newcastle, Australia
19:15 UTC+10		Report	Ordóñez 90+2'	Stadium: McDonald Jones Stadium; Attendance: 23,167; Referee: Lorraine Watson (Scotland)

9 June Friendly	Australia	3–1	Mexico	Sydney, Australia
19:00 UTC+10	Kennedy 22'; Barreras 36' (o.g.); Foord 70'	Report	Ordóñez 26'	Stadium: CommBank Stadium; Attendance: 18,441; Referee: Stacey Pearson (England)

9 October Friendly	Germany	4–2	Australia	Karlsruhe, Germany
20:30 UTC+1	Kössler 23', 30'; Küver 83'; Nüsken 90+4'	Report	Kerr 45+2'; McNamara 90+2'	Stadium: Wildparkstadion; Attendance: 26,352; Referee: Olivia Tschon (Austria)

13 October Friendly	Haiti	1–7	Australia	Chambly, France
21:00 UTC+1	Dumornay 3'	Report	McKenna 2', 44'; K. Louis 53' (o.g.); Foord 65'; Galic 72'; Wheeler 79'; McNamara 89'	Stadium: Stade Walter-Luzi; Referee: Jelena Medjedovic (Serbia)

28 November Friendly	Australia	v	Colombia	Canberra, Australia
19:35 UTC+11		Source		Stadium: GIO Stadium

2 December Friendly	Australia	v	Colombia	Geelong, Australia
19:35 UTC+11		Source		Stadium: GMHBA Stadium

=== 2027 ===
19 April 2028 Olympic Qualifiers	Chinese Taipei	v	Australia	Taiwan
		Source

24 April 2028 Olympic Qualifiers	Australia	v	Japan	Australia
		Source

June 2027 World Cup GS	Australia	v	TBD	Brazil

June/July 2027 World Cup GS	Australia	v	TBD	Brazil

July 2027 World Cup GS	Australia	v	TBD	Brazil

7 October 2028 Olympic Qualifiers	Uzbekistan	v	Australia	Uzbekistan
		Source

12 October 2028 Olympic Qualifiers	Australia	v	Uzbekistan	Australia
		Source

29 November 2028 Olympic Qualifiers	Australia	v	Chinese Taipei	Australia
		Source

4 December 2028 Olympic Qualifiers	Japan	v	Australia	Japan
		Source

== Coaching staff ==
=== Current coaching staff ===
As of 17 June 2025.

Position	Name
Head coach	(Australia) Joe Montemurro
Assistant coaches	(Australia) Joe Palatsides
Assistant coaches	(England) Emily Husband
Goalkeeping coach	(Australia) Tony Franken
Set piece coach	(England) Leanne Hall

=== Manager history ===
As of 13 October 2026 after the match against Haiti.

#	Name	Year(s)	G	W	D	L	Win %	Ref.
1	(England) Joe O'Connor	1975	4	2	0	2	50.00	
2	(Australia) Jim Selby	1979–1980	6	2	3	1	33.33	
3	(Australia) Trixie Tagg	1981	1	1	0	0	100.00	
4	(Australia) Jim Selby (Note: Jim Selby's two stints as manager spanned 1979–1980 and 1983–1984 with a total of 14 matches with 5 wins, 6 draws and 3 losses giving 35.71% wins.)	1983–1984	8	3	3	2	37.50	
5	(Australia) Fred Robins	1986–1987	9	3	1	5	33.33	
6	(Australia) John Doyle	1988–1989	7	3	0	4	42.86	
7	(England) Steve Darby	1989–1991	6	3	2	1	50.00	
8	(Australia) John Reid	1994	5	0	2	3	0.00	
9	(Scotland) Tom Sermanni	1994–1997	32	13	3	16	40.63	
10	(Australia) Greg Brown	1997–1999	37	14	8	15	37.84	
11	(Australia) Chris Tanzey	1999–2000	17	3	3	11	17.65	
12	(Australia) Adrian Santrac	2001–2004	43	19	9	15	44.19	
13	(Scotland) Tom Sermanni	2005–2012	106	61	12	33	57.55	
14	(Netherlands) Hesterine de Reus	2013–2014	13	6	2	5	46.15	
15	(Australia) Alen Stajcic	2014–2019	63	35	15	13	55.56	
16	(Australia) Ante Milicic	2019–2020	16	11	2	3	68.75	
17	(Sweden) Tony Gustavsson	2020–2024	59	30	7	22	50.85	
18	(Scotland) Tom Sermanni (Note: Tom Sermanni's three stints as manager spanned 1994–1997, 2005–2012 and 2024–2025 with a total of 151 matches with 81 wins, 16 draws and 54 losses giving 53.64% wins.)	2024–2025	13	7	1	5	53.85	
19	(Australia) Joe Montemurro	2025–present	20	13	2	5	65.00	

== Players ==
=== Current squad ===
The following players were called up for two international friendly matches against Colombia on 28 November and 2 December 2026.

Caps and goals correct as of 13 October 2026, after the match against Haiti.

No.	Pos.	Player	Date of birth (age)	Caps	Goals	Club
1	GK	Mackenzie Arnold	25 February 1994 (age 32)	71	0	(United States Soccer Federation) Portland Thorns
12	GK	Teagan Micah	20 October 1997 (age 29)	28	0	(French Football Federation) Lyon
18	GK	Chloe Lincoln	4 January 2005 (age 21)	6	0	(Football Australia) Brisbane Roar
2	DF	Courtney Nevin	12 February 2002 (age 24)	47	1	(Swedish Football Association) Malmö
3	DF	Wini Heatley	18 June 2001 (age 25)	24	0	(Italian Football Federation) Roma
5	DF	Tori Tumeth	4 March 2001 (age 25)	2	0	(Canadian Soccer Association) Vancouver Rise
7	DF	Steph Catley	26 January 1994 (age 32)	149	7	(The Football Association) Arsenal
8	FW	Kaitlyn Torpey	17 March 2000 (age 26)	31	2	(The Football Association) Newcastle United
14	DF	Alanna Kennedy	21 January 1995 (age 31)	152	18	(The Football Association) London City Lionesses
21	DF	Ellie Carpenter	28 April 2000 (age 26)	102	5	(The Football Association) Chelsea
22	DF	Charli Grant	20 September 2001 (age 25)	40	2	(Swedish Football Association) Malmö
28	DF	Alexia Apostolakis	16 May 2006 (age 20)	2	0	(The Football Association) Bristol City
6	MF	Clare Wheeler	14 January 1998 (age 28)	44	4	(The Football Association) Everton
10	MF	Emily van Egmond	12 July 1993 (age 33)	175	33	(The Football Association) Charlton Athletic
11	FW	Mary Fowler	14 February 2003 (age 23)	71	17	(The Football Association) Manchester City
13	MF	Tameka Yallop	16 June 1991 (age 35)	136	14	(New Zealand Football) Wellington Phoenix
15	MF	Alana Murphy	21 September 2005 (age 21)	8	0	(The Football Association) Nottingham Forest
17	MF	Amy Sayer	30 November 2001 (age 24)	28	5	(Swedish Football Association) Malmö
23	MF	Kyra Cooney-Cross	15 February 2002 (age 24)	67	2	(The Football Association) Arsenal
29	MF	Daniela Galić	17 June 2006 (age 20)	6	1	(Swedish Football Association) Vittsjö
9	FW	Caitlin Foord	11 November 1994 (age 32)	152	42	(The Football Association) Arsenal
16	FW	Hayley Raso	5 September 1994 (age 32)	112	24	(German Football Association) Eintracht Frankfurt
19	FW	Leticia McKenna	7 August 2002 (age 24)	4	3	(The Football Association) Nottingham Forest
20	FW	Sam Kerr (captain)	10 September 1993 (age 33)	143	76	(United States Soccer Federation) Gotham FC
26	FW	Remy Siemsen	10 November 1999 (age 27)	20	0	(Swedish Football Association) Rosengård
27	FW	Kahli Johnson	18 February 2004 (age 22)	3	1	(Canadian Soccer Association) Calgary Wild

=== Recent call-ups ===
The following players have also been called up to the squad within the past 12 months.

Pos.	Player	Date of birth (age)	Caps	Goals	Club	Latest call-up
GK	Courtney Newbon	14 September 2000 (age 26)	0	0	(Australia) Melbourne Victory	v. Haiti, 13 October 2026
GK	Ilona Melegh	2 August 2008 (age 18)	0	0	(Australia) Adelaide United	v. Mexico, 9 June 2026
GK	Morgan Aquino	4 August 2001 (age 25)	0	0	(Australia) Central Coast Mariners	2026 FIFA Series
GK	Jada Mathyssen-Whyman	24 October 1999 (age 27)	0	0	(Australia) Sydney FC	2026 Women's Asian Cup
DF	Jamilla Rankin	9 May 2003 (age 23)	11	0	(Germany) Eintracht Frankfurt	v. Haiti, 13 October 2026
DF	Charlize Rule ^{INJ}	16 February 2003 (age 23)	8	0	(England) Brighton & Hove Albion	v. Mexico, 9 June 2026
DF	Jessika Nash	5 October 2004 (age 22)	4	0	(Australia) Melbourne City	2026 FIFA Series
DF	Clare Hunt ^{INJ}	12 March 1999 (age 27)	44	1	(England) Tottenham Hotspur	2026 Women's Asian Cup
MF	Alex Chidiac	15 January 1999 (age 27)	41	3	(Italy) Como	v. Haiti, 13 October 2026
MF	Leah Davidson	28 March 2001 (age 25)	4	1	(England) Charlton Athletic	v. Haiti, 13 October 2026
MF	Hana Lowry	23 April 2003 (age 23)	0	0	(Norway) Vålerenga	v. Haiti, 13 October 2026
MF	Isabel Gomez	6 July 2002 (age 24)	2	0	(Sweden) Rosengård	v. Mexico, 9 June 2026
MF	Katrina Gorry	13 August 1992 (age 34)	123	18	Unattached	2026 Women's Asian Cup
FW	Holly McNamara ^{INJ}	23 January 2003 (age 23)	22	4	(England) Everton	v. Haiti, 13 October 2026
FW	Michelle Heyman	4 July 1988 (age 38)	87	33	(Australia) Canberra United	2026 Women's Asian Cup
Notes: ^{INJ} = Withdrew due to injury

== Player records ==
As of 13 October 2026
Players in bold are still active with the national team.

=== Most appearances ===
Rank	Player	Career	Caps	Goals
1	**Emily van Egmond**	2010–present	175	33
2	Clare Polkinghorne	2006–2024	169	16
3	**Alanna Kennedy**	2012–present	152	18
3	**Caitlin Foord**	2011–present	152	42
4	Cheryl Salisbury	1994–2009	151	38
5	Lisa De Vanna	2004–2019	150	47
7	**Steph Catley**	2012–present	149	7
8	**Sam Kerr**	2009–present	143	76
9	**Tameka Yallop**	2007–present	136	14
10	Heather Garriock	1999–2011	130	20

=== Top goalscorers ===
Rank	Player	Career	Goals	Caps	Avg.
1	**Sam Kerr** (list)	2009–present	76	143	0.54
2	Lisa De Vanna	2004–2019	47	150	0.31
3	**Caitlin Foord**	2011–present	42	152	0.28
4	Kate Gill	2004–2015	41	86	0.48
5	Cheryl Salisbury	1994–2009	38	151	0.25
6	**Michelle Heyman**	2010–present	33	87	0.38
6	**Emily van Egmond**	2010–present	33	175	0.19
8	Sarah Walsh	2004–2012	32	70	0.46
9	Kyah Simon	2007–2023	29	111	0.26
10	Joanne Peters	1996–2009	28	110	0.25

=== Most clean sheets ===
Rank	Player	Span	Clean sheets	Caps	Ratio
1	Melissa Barbieri	2002–2015	34	86	0.40
2	Lydia Williams	2005–2024	31	104	0.30
3	**Mackenzie Arnold**	2012–present	26	70	0.37
4	Tracey Wheeler	1989–2000	16	49	0.33
5	**Teagan Micah**	2021–present	11	28	0.39
6	Belinda Kitching	1996–1999	9	32	0.28
6	Claire Nichols	1994–2003	9	19	0.47
8	Cassandra Kell	2002–2004	7	24	0.29
9	Brianna Davey	2012–2015	5	18	0.28

=== Captains ===
Player	Span	Ref.
Patricia O'Connor	1975	
Julie Dolan	1979–1984	
Sue Monteath	1984–1987	
Julie Murray	1995–1999	
Alison Forman	2000	
Cheryl Salisbury	2003–2009	
Melissa Barbieri	2010–2013	
Clare Polkinghorne & Kate Gill	2013–2014	
Clare Polkinghorne & Lisa De Vanna	2015–2019	
Sam Kerr & Steph Catley	2019–present	

== Competitive record ==
Australia has played matches against international opponents on a consistent basis since 1978. To date, they have played 55 different nations and governing bodies, across FIFA World Cups, invitational tournaments, the OFC Women's Nations Cup (until 2004), the AFC Women's Asian Cup (from 2006) and international friendlies.

=== FIFA Women's World Cup ===
FIFA Women's World Cup record
Year	Result	Position	Pld	W	D	L	GF	GA
(China) 1991	Did not qualify							
(Sweden) 1995	Group stage	12th	3	0	0	3	3	13
(United States) 1999	Group stage	11th	3	0	1	2	3	7
(United States) 2003	Group stage	13th	3	0	1	2	3	5
(China) 2007	Quarter-finals	6th	4	1	2	1	9	7
(Germany) 2011	Quarter-finals	8th	4	2	0	2	6	7
(Canada) 2015	Quarter-finals	7th	5	2	1	2	5	5
(France) 2019	Round of 16	9th	4	2	1	1	9	6
(Australia) (New Zealand) 2023	Fourth place	4th	7	3	1	3	10	8
(Brazil) 2027	Qualified							
(Costa Rica) (Jamaica) (Mexico) (United States) 2031	To be determined							
(United Kingdom) 2035	To be determined							
Total:9/10	Fourth place	4th	33	10	7	16	48	58

=== Olympic Games ===
Summer Olympics record
Year	Result	Position	Pld	W	D	L	GF	GA
(United States) 1996	Did not qualify							
(Australia) 2000	Group stage	7th	3	0	1	2	2	6
(Greece) 2004	Quarter-finals	5th	4	1	1	2	3	4
(China) 2008	Did not qualify							
(United Kingdom) 2012	Did not qualify							
(Brazil) 2016	Quarter-finals	7th	4	1	2	1	8	5
(Japan) 2020	Fourth place	4th	6	2	1	3	11	13
(France) 2024	Group stage	9th	3	1	0	2	7	10
(United States) 2028	To be determined							
(Australia) 2032	Qualified as hosts							
Total:5/8	Fourth place	4th	20	5	5	10	31	38

=== OFC Women's Nations Cup ===
OFC Women's Nations Cup record
Year	Result	Position	Pld	W	D	L	GF	GA
(New Caledonia) 1983	Runners-up	2nd	4	2	1	1	20	3
(New Zealand) 1986	Runners-up	2nd	4	2	0	2	4	6
(Australia) 1989	Third place	3rd	4	1	1	2	7	6
(Australia) 1991	Runners-up	2nd	4	3	0	1	21	1
(Papua New Guinea) 1994	Champions	1st	4	3	0	1	13	2
(New Zealand) 1998	Champions	1st	4	4	0	0	49	1
(Australia) 2003	Champions	1st	4	4	0	0	45	0
Total	7/7	3 titles	28	19	2	7	159	19

=== AFC Women's Asian Cup ===
AFC Women's Asian Cup									Qualification					
Year	Result	Position	Pld	W	D	L	GF	GA	Pld	W	D	L	GF	GA
(British Hong Kong) 1975 (Note: An Australian representative side (largely from the St. George club and the New South Wales state team) participated and had been labelled as "Australia" by the organisers. These games have not been recognised as official Australian A-internationals, but the players achievements were recognised as such in 2023.)	Third place	3rd	4	2	0	2	12	6	No Qualification					
(Taiwan) 1977	Not an AFC member								No Qualification					
(India) 1980 (Note: The 1980 AFC Women's Championship had a team representing Western Australia, but not the Australian national team.)	Third place match	3rd/4th	6	2	0	4	4	10	No Qualification					
1981–2003	Not an AFC member								No Qualification					
(Australia) 2006	Runners-up	2nd	6	4	2	0	15	2	Qualified as host					
(Vietnam) 2008	Fourth place	4th	5	2	0	3	7	9	Directly Qualified					
(China) 2010	Champions	1st	5	4	0	1	7	3	Directly Qualified					
(Vietnam) 2014	Runners-up	2nd	5	3	1	1	9	5	Directly Qualified					
(Jordan) 2018	Runners-up	2nd	5	1	3	1	11	4	Directly Qualified					
(India) 2022	Quarter-finals	5th	4	3	0	1	24	2	Directly Qualified					
(Australia) 2026	Runners-up	2nd	6	4	1	1	12	6	Qualified as host					
(Uzbekistan) 2029	To be determined								0	0	0	0	0	0
Total:7/20	1 Title		46	25	7	14	101	47	0	0	0	0	0	0

=== ASEAN Women's Championship ===
ASEAN Women's Championship record
Year	Result	Position	Pld	W	D	L	GF	GA
(Vietnam) 2004	Did not participate							
(Vietnam) 2006	Did not participate							
(Myanmar) 2007	Did not participate							
(Vietnam) 2008	Champions	1st	5	5	0	0	21	1
(Laos) 2011	Did not participate							
(Vietnam) 2012	Did not participate							
(Myanmar) 2013	See Australia women's national under-20 soccer team							
(Vietnam) 2015	See Australia women's national under-20 soccer team							
(Myanmar) 2016	See Australia women's national under-20 soccer team							
(Indonesia) 2018	See Australia women's national under-20 soccer team							
(Thailand) 2019	Did not participate							
(Philippines) 2022	See Australia women's national under-23 soccer team							
(Vietnam) 2025	See Australia women's national under-23 soccer team							
Total	1/6	1 title	5	5	0	0	21	1

== Honours ==
=== Major tournaments ===
- OFC Women's Championship

(gold) Champions: 1994, 1998, 2003
(silver) Runners-up: 1983, 1986, 1991
(bronze) Third place: 1989

- AFC Women's Asian Cup

(gold) Champions: 2010
(silver) Runners-up: 2006, 2014, 2018, 2026
(bronze) Third place: 1975

=== Regional ===
- ASEAN Women's Championship (previously AFF Women's Championship)

(gold) Champions: 2008

=== Minor tournaments ===
(gold) Champions: Australia Cup – 1999, 2001, 2002
(gold) Champions: Cup of Nations – 2019, 2023
(gold) Champions: 2026 FIFA Series Kenya
(gold) Champions: 2017 Tournament of Nations
(gold) Champions: 2013 Centenary Cup
(gold) Champions: Torneio Cidade de Uberlândia (Brazil) – 1995

== See also ==
- Australia men's national soccer team
- Sport in Australia
- Soccer in Australia
- Women's soccer in Australia
- A-League Women – Current Australian women's national league
- Women's National Soccer League (WNSL) – defunct Australian women's national league
- Australia women's national soccer team results (1975–99)
- Australia women's national soccer team results (2000–09)
- Australia women's national soccer team results (2010–19)
- Matildas: The World at Our Feet

== Bibliography ==
- Williams, Jean (2007). "Waltzing the Matildas: Women's Football in Australia". A Beautiful Game: International Perspectives on Women's Football. Berg Publishers. ISBN 978-1845206758.
- Crawford, Fiona; McGowan, Lee (2020). Never Say Die: The hundred-year overnight success of Australian women's football. Sydney, N.S.W.: NewSouth. ISBN 978-1-74223-666-7. OCLC 1112693898.

Sporting positions
Preceded by 2008 North Korea	AFC Women's Champions; 2010 (first title)	Succeeded by 2014 Japan

Preceded by 1991 New Zealand	OFC Women's Champions; 1995 (First title); 1998 (Second title); 2003 (Third title)	Succeeded by 2007 New Zealand
Preceded by 2008 North Korea	Asian Cup Champions; 2010 (First title)	Succeeded by 2014 Japan
