= Matildas fever =

Australian community spirit in 2023 World Cup

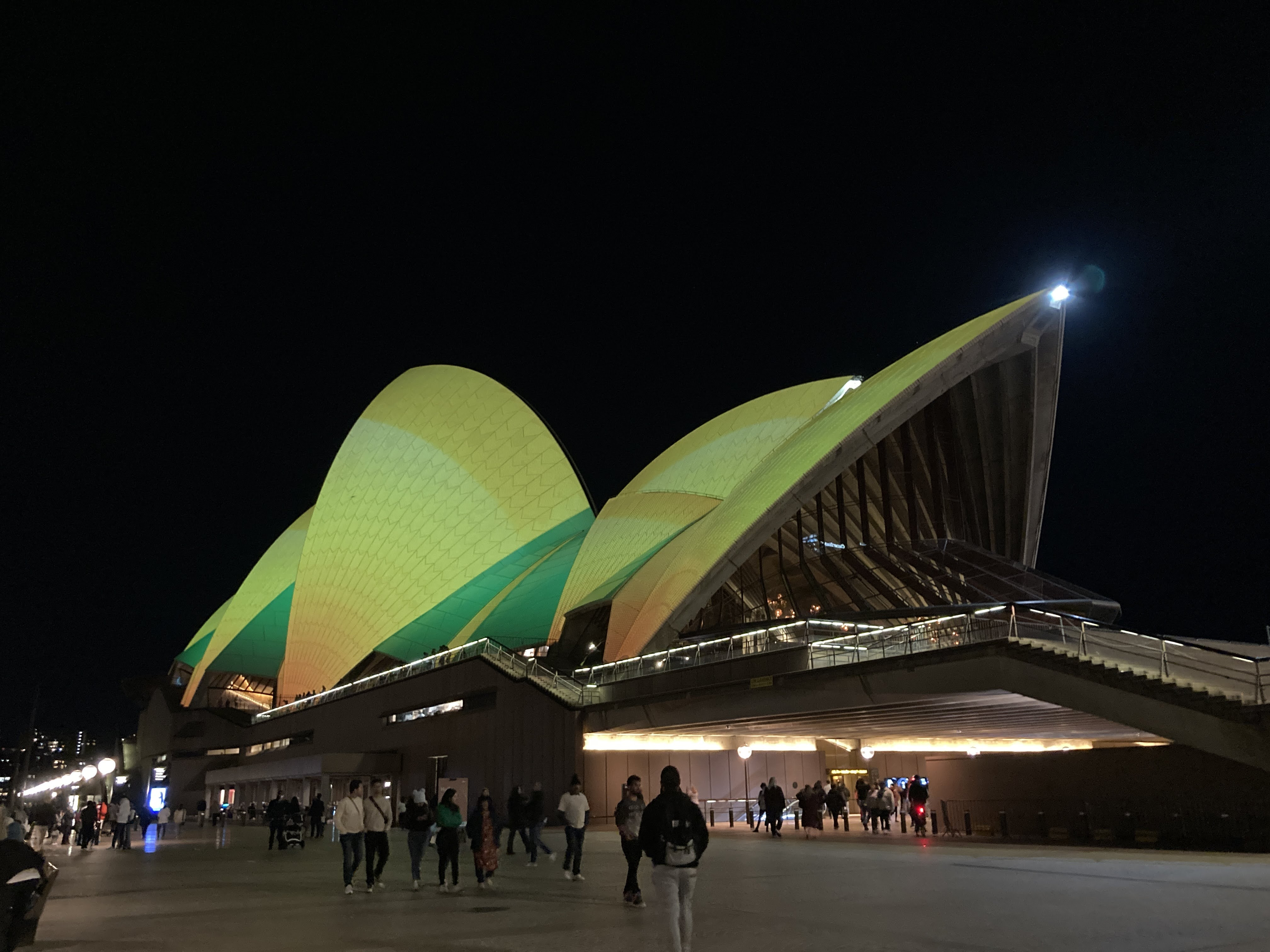
The Sydney Opera House lit up in support of the Matildas on 7 August, before the Australia vs. Denmark match

In the 2023 FIFA Women's World Cup, the performance of the Australia women's national soccer team (nicknamed "the Matildas") captivated nationwide attention and had a significant ongoing impact on the perception of women's sport in Australia. Some media outlets and academics used the terms Matildas fever to describe the community spirit on display, and Matildas effect to express the team's impact.

Throughout the tournament, more kits representing the Australian women's team were sold than for the national men's team ("the Socceroos"), for the first time. Every match featuring Australia sold out before the World Cup began. Australian TV viewership records were broken several times, with live viewing sites set up in major stadiums to cope with crowds growing each game. The Australia vs. England semi-final became the most-watched broadcast in Australian history, with 11.15 million watching on the Seven Network. It was the furthest an Australian soccer team had advanced in a World Cup.

As a direct result of the Matildas' success, the Australian government pledged $200 million to improve women's sporting facilities. In the 2024 winter soccer season, clubs around the country reported a record number of registrations for female players, with a 34 percent increase compared to the year prior. This influx of new members overwhelmed many regional soccer clubs.

== Viewership ==
Australian TV broadcast viewership records were broken multiple times. The Australia vs. Denmark match on 7 August was watched by 3.56 million on average, eclipsing the audience of the NRL State of Origin series and every NRL Grand Final since 2016. On 12 August, the Australia vs. France quarter-final drew about 4.17 million viewers on the Seven Network, becoming the biggest broadcast of 2023 at the time. Four days later, the Australia vs. England semi-final became the most-watched broadcast in country's history, averaging 7.13 million viewers, with a total of 11.15 million watching at one point. That number did not take into account the crowds at pubs and viewing sites around the country watching, with three stadiums in Sydney screening the match to the public, in a first for the city.

The Seven Network delayed the start of their flagship 6 pm news bulletin to allow for the full quarter-final match to be shown live, in a rare move for the broadcaster. Further, the AFL delayed the opening bounce of the Carlton vs. Melbourne game that night. Stadiums in use that day including the MCG, SCG and Optus Stadium all showed the Matildas' match on their screens before and after the games of their respective fixtures.

== Social impact ==
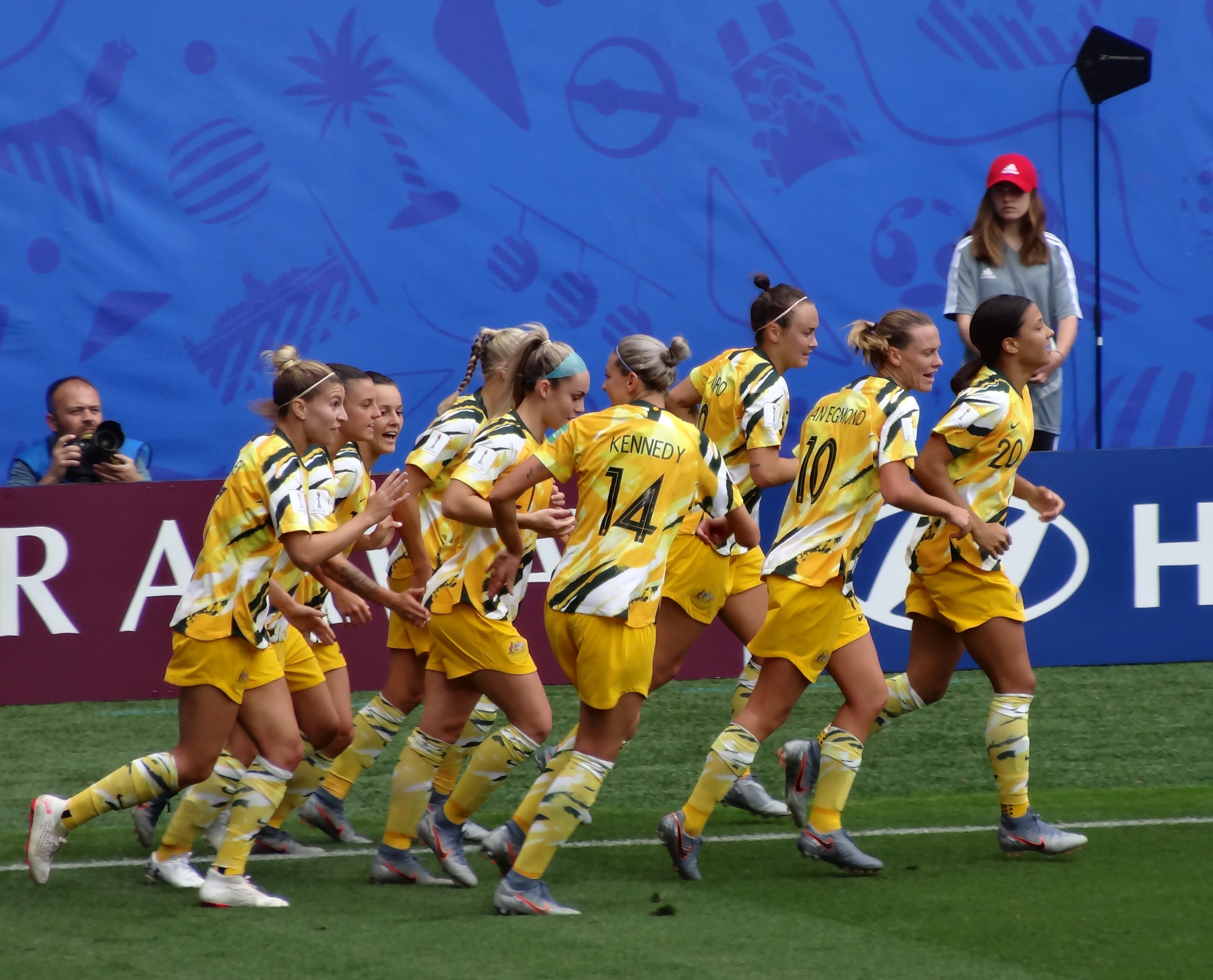
The Matildas competing in the Women's World Cup 2019

CEO of Football Australia, James Johnson, said the Matildas' run was "really bringing Australia [communities] together". Several New South Wales public schools held "green and gold mufti-days" on the day of the semi-final match.

Many writers said that Australia's 7–6 penalty shootout win against France in the quarter-final round was an iconic cultural moment comparable to Cathy Freeman's 400 meter sprint win in the 2000 Sydney Olympics. Referring to the game, Samantha Lewis for ABC News wrote: "Years from now, when someone asks you to tell the story of the night the Matildas made World Cup history, what will you say? The France game. Maybe that will be all you'll need to say."

According to research company Honeycomb Strategy, 69 percent of Australians said they were more likely to follow other women's sporting events following the Women's World Cup.

We are not so much watching a national team compete, as a changing nation at play... [The Matildas have] overturned misconceptions of women’s sport and more importantly, the place of women in contemporary Australia.

— Craig Foster, Australian retired soccer player

In March 2024, Football NSW reported a 34 percent increase in registrations for female players. More than 25,000 new players signed up to play compared to the year prior. It raised concerns that the infrastructure of some regional clubs would be overwhelmed.

The Australian National University named Matilda the Word of the Year of 2023. A mural of the team was painted at Bondi Beach, and a statue featuring the team was announced for outside of Suncorp Stadium.

== Economic impact ==
Every match featuring Australia sold out before the World Cup began, with 1.4 million tickets sold, an increase from the 2019 World Cup in France four years prior. As of March 2024, every professional game the Matildas participated in following the World Cup had also sold out.

Double the amount of jerseys for the Matildas were sold during the 2023 FIFA Women's World Cup compared to Socceroos jerseys in the Qatar World Cup the year prior. The Courier-Mail said the Matildas were responsible for a $50 million economic boom for Brisbane. British media company SportsPro said the Matildas' media value had built to $2.78 billion through the tournament.

During the tournament, the Albanese government announced pledged $200 million to improve women's sporting facilities. The guidelines of the grant stipulated the money would be used to "promote equal access, build more suitable facilities, and support grassroots initiatives to get women and girls to engage, stay, and participate in sport throughout their lives."

Both the Prime Minister of Australia, Anthony Albanese, and other state leaders pushed for a public holiday if the Matildas won the tournament. Opposition leader Peter Dutton said this stance was a publicity stunt, and would have a dire economic impact.
