= Hesterine de Reus =

Dutch football coach and former player (born 1961)

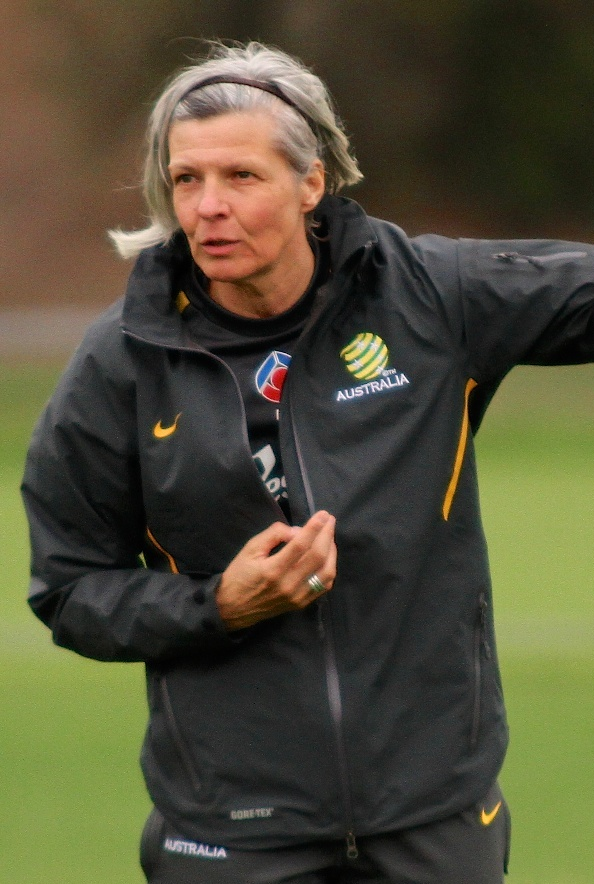
- De Reus in 2014, coaching during a Matildas camp

Personal information
- Full name: Hesterine Jannetje de Reus
- Date of birth: 6 December 1961 (age 64)
- Place of birth: Poortugaal, Netherlands

Youth career
- PSV Poortugaal

Senior career*
Years	Team	Apps	(Gls)
- DCL
- KFC '71
- VV Rijsoord

International career
1983–1992	Netherlands	43	(0)

Managerial career
- 1997–1998: VV Rijsoord
- 1998–2003: SV Saestum
- 2002–2004: Netherlands U-15
- 2004–2007: Netherlands U-17
- 2007–2010: Netherlands U-19
- 2010–2011: Jordan
- 2012: PSV/FC Eindhoven
- 2013–2014: Australia
- 2017–2018: China U-20
- 2024–2025: Ajax
- * Club domestic league appearances and goals

Hesterine Jannetje de Reus (born 6 December 1961) is a Dutch football coach and former player who most recently managed Ajax women's team. She has coached women's national and youth teams as well as Dutch domestic league teams.

== Childhood in football ==
As a child, de Reus and her family regularly attended Feyenoord matches. She began playing soccer when she was 7 and said that women's football in the Netherlands grew in professionalism over time after it was formally recognized in 1971.

== Playing career ==
From 1983 to 1992, de Reus gained 43 caps as a player for the Netherlands women's national football team.

== Managerial career ==
In 1994, she began working as a coach for the Royal Dutch Football Association (KNVB). In 2007, she became the coach for the Dutch national under-19 team.

On 1 October 2010, she became the coach and technical director of Jordan's national women's team, which won the 2010 Arabia Cup the following month. As Jordan's coach, she petitioned FIFA to allow football players to wear a hijab. In April 2011, three Jordanian players refused to play for de Reus's team because they suspected she was a lesbian.

On 4 June 2012, PSV, then known as PSV/FC Eindhoven, named de Reus as the first coach for its professional team. At the end of 2012, with PSV in third place in the BeNe League halfway through its first season, de Reus left Eindhoven to coach Australia's women's national team. de Reus was fired by Football Federation Australia in April 2014, after a player mutiny brought about by her coaching style.

She coached China's women's under-20 team, including a third-place finish at the 2017 AFC U-19 Women's Championship.

de Reus was named Ajax's head coach on April 12, 2024. In her first match, Ajax lost the Eredivisie Supercup to FC Twente, 6–1. Eight days later, Ajax failed to advance in UEFA Women's Champions League qualifying. de Reus said that she was "not really sour" about missing out on European competition so that her team could focus on the Eredivisie, though she later clarified that it was disappointing that Ajax had lost.

== Managerial statistics ==
As of 12 September 2022

Team	From	To	Record				
Team	From	To	G	W	D	L	Win %
Australia women's	2013	2014	13	6	2	5	46.15
Total			13	6	2	5	46.15
