= List of international goals scored by Sam Kerr =

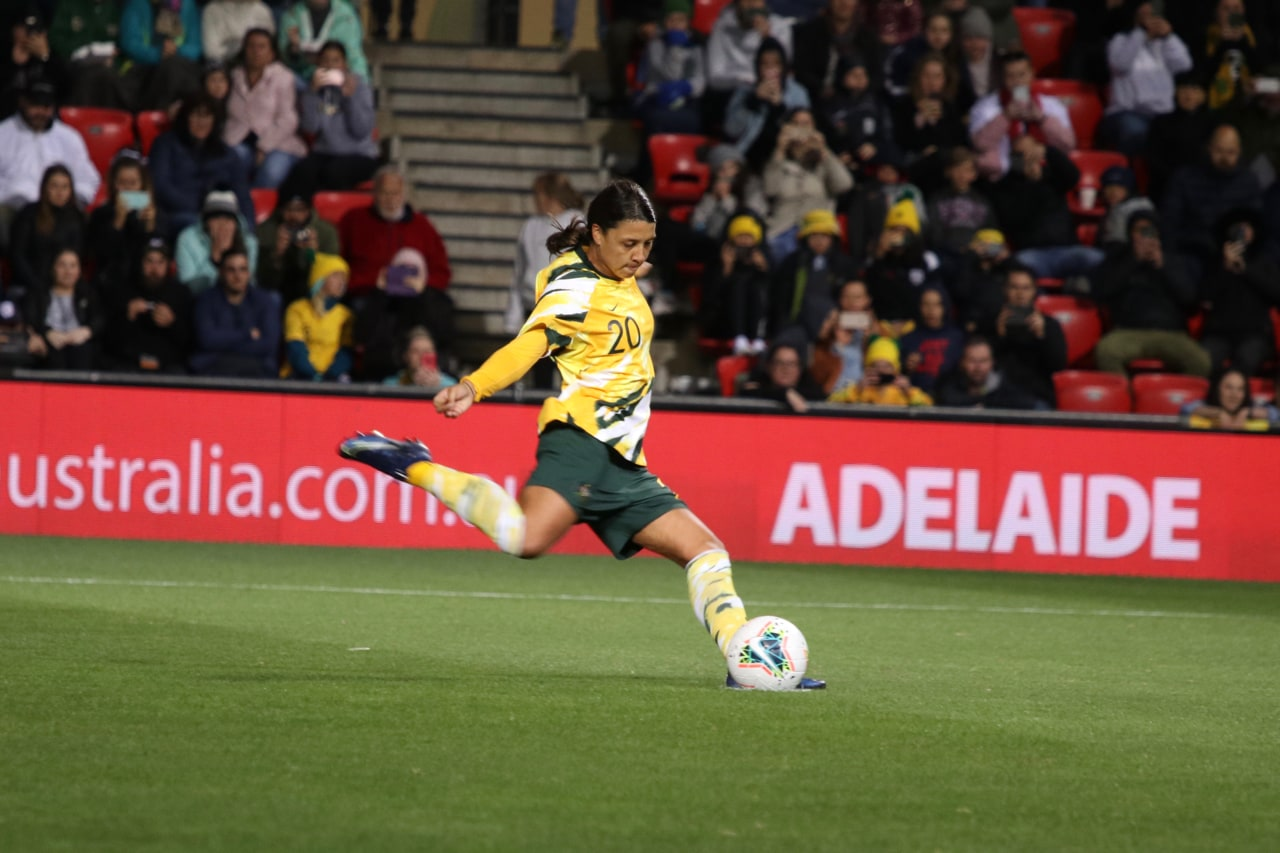
Kerr scoring a goal against China in 2017.

Sam Kerr is an Australian professional soccer player who currently plays as a striker for Gotham FC in the NWSL and for the Australia national team (nicknamed the "Matildas"). With a current total of 76 international goals, she is Australia's all-time leading goalscorer.

== Goals ==
Scores and results list Australia's goal tally first, score column indicates score after each Kerr goal.
As of match played 9 October 2026

List of international goals scored by Sam Kerr
No.	Date	Venue	Opponent	Score	Result	Competition	Ref.
1	21 May 2010	Chengdu Sports Centre, Chengdu, China	South Korea	3–0	3–1	2010 AFC Women's Asian Cup	
2	30 May 2010	Chengdu Sports Centre, Chengdu, China	North Korea	1–0	1–1	2010 AFC Women's Asian Cup	
3	28 October 2010	Volkswagen Arena, Wolfsburg, Germany	Germany	1–0	1–2	Friendly	
4	7 March 2014	GSP Stadium, Nicosia, Cyprus	France	1–3	2–3	2014 Cyprus Cup	
5	12 March 2014	Paralimni Stadium, Paralimni, Cyprus	Italy	1–0	5–2	2014 Cyprus Cup	
6	21 May 2015	Jubilee Oval, Sydney, Australia	Vietnam	5–0	11–0	Friendly	
7	21 May 2015	Jubilee Oval, Sydney, Australia	Vietnam	8–0	11–0	Friendly	
8	6 August 2016	Arena Corinthians, São Paulo, Brazil	Germany	1–0	2–2	2016 Summer Olympics	
9	30 July 2017	Qualcomm Stadium, San Diego, United States	Japan	1–1	4–2	2017 Tournament of Nations	
10	30 July 2017	Qualcomm Stadium, San Diego, United States	Japan	2–1	4–2	2017 Tournament of Nations	
11	30 July 2017	Qualcomm Stadium, San Diego, United States	Japan	3–1	4–2	2017 Tournament of Nations	
12	3 August 2017	StubHub Center, Carson, United States	Brazil	6–1	6–1	2017 Tournament of Nations	
13	16 September 2017	Penrith Stadium, Sydney, Australia	Brazil	2–0	2–1	Friendly	
14	19 September 2017	McDonald Jones Stadium, Newcastle, Australia	Brazil	1–1	3–2	Friendly	
15	19 September 2017	McDonald Jones Stadium, Newcastle, Australia	Brazil	3–1	3–2	Friendly	
16	22 November 2017	AAMI Park, Melbourne, Australia	China	1–0	3–0	Friendly	
17	22 November 2017	AAMI Park, Melbourne, Australia	China	3–0	3–0	Friendly	
18	26 November 2017	Simmonds Stadium, Geelong, Australia	China	3–1	5–1	Friendly	
19	26 November 2017	Simmonds Stadium, Geelong, Australia	China	4–1	5–1	Friendly	
20	28 February 2018	Albufeira Municipal Stadium, Albufeira, Portugal	Norway	3–1	4–3	2018 Algarve Cup	
21	5 March 2018	Albufeira Municipal Stadium, Albufeira, Portugal	China	2–0	2–0	2018 Algarve Cup	
22	10 April 2018	Amman International Stadium, Amman, Jordan	Vietnam	5–0	8–0	2018 AFC Women's Asian Cup	
23	10 April 2018	Amman International Stadium, Amman, Jordan	Vietnam	6–0	8–0	2018 AFC Women's Asian Cup	
24	13 April 2018	Amman International Stadium, Amman, Jordan	Japan	1–1	1–1	2018 AFC Women's Asian Cup	
25	26 July 2018	Children's Mercy Park, Kansas City, United States	Brazil	3–0	3–1	2018 Tournament of Nations	
26	2 August 2018	Toyota Park, Bridgeview, Illinois, United States	Japan	2–0	2–0	2018 Tournament of Nations	
27	13 November 2018	McDonald Jones Stadium, Newcastle, Australia	Chile	1–0	5–0	Friendly	
28	3 March 2019	Suncorp Stadium, Brisbane, Australia	South Korea	1–0	4–1	2019 Cup of Nations	
29	3 March 2019	Suncorp Stadium, Brisbane, Australia	South Korea	3–1	4–1	2019 Cup of Nations	
30	6 March 2019	AAMI Park, Melbourne, Australia	Argentina	1–0	3–0	2019 Cup of Nations	
31	4 April 2019	Dick's Sporting Goods Park, Commerce City, United States	United States	3–4	3–5	Friendly	
32	9 June 2019	Stade du Hainaut, Valenciennes, France	Italy	1–0	1–2	2019 FIFA Women's World Cup	
33	18 June 2019	Stade des Alpes, Grenoble, France	Jamaica	1–0	4–1	2019 FIFA Women's World Cup	
34	18 June 2019	Stade des Alpes, Grenoble, France	Jamaica	2–0	4–1	2019 FIFA Women's World Cup	
35	18 June 2019	Stade des Alpes, Grenoble, France	Jamaica	3–1	4–1	2019 FIFA Women's World Cup	
36	18 June 2019	Stade des Alpes, Grenoble, France	Jamaica	4–1	4–1	2019 FIFA Women's World Cup	
37	9 November 2019	Bankwest Stadium, Sydney, Australia	Chile	1–0	2–1	Friendly	
38	9 November 2019	Bankwest Stadium, Sydney, Australia	Chile	2–0	2–1	Friendly	
39	7 February 2020	Campbelltown Stadium, Sydney, Australia	Chinese Taipei	6–0	7–0	2020 AFC Women's Olympic Qualifying Tournament	
40	6 March 2020	McDonald Jones Stadium, Newcastle, Australia	Vietnam	1–0	5–0	2020 AFC Women's Olympic Qualifying Tournament	
41	6 March 2020	McDonald Jones Stadium, Newcastle, Australia	Vietnam	5–0	5–0	2020 AFC Women's Olympic Qualifying Tournament	
42	11 March 2020	Cẩm Phả Stadium, Cẩm Phả, Vietnam	Vietnam	1–0	2–1	2020 AFC Women's Olympic Qualifying Tournament	
43	21 July 2021	Ajinomoto Stadium, Chofu, Japan	New Zealand	2–0	2–1	2020 Summer Olympics	
44	24 July 2021	Saitama Stadium 2002, Saitama, Japan	Sweden	1–1	2–4	2020 Summer Olympics	
45	24 July 2021	Saitama Stadium 2002, Saitama, Japan	Sweden	2–1	2–4	2020 Summer Olympics	
46	30 July 2021	Kashima Stadium, Kashima, Japan	Great Britain	2–2	4–3	2020 Summer Olympics	
47	30 July 2021	Kashima Stadium, Kashima, Japan	Great Britain	4–2	4–3	2020 Summer Olympics	
48	5 August 2021	Kashima Stadium, Kashima, Japan	United States	1–1	3–4	2020 Summer Olympics	
49	26 October 2021	Commonwealth Bank Stadium, Sydney, Australia	Brazil	2–0	2–2	Friendly	
50	21 January 2022	Mumbai Football Arena, Mumbai, India	Indonesia	1–0	18–0	2022 AFC Women's Asian Cup	
51	21 January 2022	Mumbai Football Arena, Mumbai, India	Indonesia	2–0	18–0	2022 AFC Women's Asian Cup	
52	21 January 2022	Mumbai Football Arena, Mumbai, India	Indonesia	6–0	18–0	2022 AFC Women's Asian Cup	
53	21 January 2022	Mumbai Football Arena, Mumbai, India	Indonesia	8–0	18–0	2022 AFC Women's Asian Cup	
54	21 January 2022	Mumbai Football Arena, Mumbai, India	Indonesia	11–0	18–0	2022 AFC Women's Asian Cup	
55	24 January 2022	Mumbai Football Arena, Mumbai, India	Philippines	1–0	4–0	2022 AFC Women's Asian Cup	
56	27 January 2022	Mumbai Football Arena, Mumbai, India	Thailand	2–0	2–1	2022 AFC Women's Asian Cup	
57	8 April 2022	QCB Stadium, Townsville, Australia	New Zealand	2–1	2–1	Friendly	
58	12 April 2022	GIO Stadium, Canberra, Australia	New Zealand	1–0	3–1	Friendly	
59	12 April 2022	GIO Stadium, Canberra, Australia	New Zealand	3–0	3–1	Friendly	
60	12 November 2022	AAMI Park, Melbourne, Australia	Sweden	1–0	4–0	Friendly	
61	15 November 2022	Central Coast Stadium, Gosford, Australia	Thailand	1–0	2–0	Friendly	
62	16 February 2023	Central Coast Stadium, Gosford, Australia	Czech Republic	3–0	4–0	2023 Cup of Nations	
63	11 April 2023	Brentford Community Stadium, London, England	England	1–0	2–0	Friendly	
64	16 August 2023	Stadium Australia, Sydney, Australia	England	1–1	1–3	2023 FIFA Women's World Cup	
65	26 October 2023	Perth Rectangular Stadium, Perth, Australia	Iran	2–0	2–0	2024 AFC Women's Olympic Qualifying Tournament	
66	29 October 2023	Perth Stadium, Perth, Australia	Philippines	2–0	8–0	2024 AFC Women's Olympic Qualifying Tournament	
67	29 October 2023	Perth Stadium, Perth, Australia	Philippines	5–0	8–0	2024 AFC Women's Olympic Qualifying Tournament	
68	29 October 2023	Perth Stadium, Perth, Australia	Philippines	6–0	8–0	2024 AFC Women's Olympic Qualifying Tournament	
69	1 November 2023	Perth Rectangular Stadium, Perth, Australia	Chinese Taipei	2–0	3–0	2024 AFC Women's Olympic Qualifying Tournament	
70	1 March 2026	Perth Stadium, Perth, Australia	Philippines	1–0	1–0	2026 AFC Women's Asian Cup	
71	8 March 2026	Stadium Australia, Sydney, Australia	South Korea	2–1	3–3	2026 AFC Women's Asian Cup	
72	13 March 2026	Perth Rectangular Stadium, Perth, Australia	North Korea	2–0	2–1	2026 AFC Women's Asian Cup	
73	17 March 2026	Perth Stadium, Perth, Australia	China	2–1	2–1	2026 AFC Women's Asian Cup	
74	11 April 2026	Nyayo National Stadium, Nairobi, Kenya	Malawi	2–0	5–0	2026 FIFA Series	
75	15 April 2026	Nyayo National Stadium, Nairobi, Kenya	Kenya	1–0	2–0	2026 FIFA Series	
76	9 October 2026	Wildparkstadion, Karlsruhe, Germany	Germany	1–2	2–4	Friendly	
