= Jean Williams =

- Occupations: Sports historian, Lecturer
- Writing career
- Language: English
- Subjects: Women’s history, Sport and literature, Sportswear, Motor sport

Jean Williams is a British professor in sport history and author specialising in women's history; sport and literature; sportswear and motorsport Having previously taught English for a decade, Williams was a senior research fellow at the International Centre for Sport History and Culture, De Montfort University. She acted as a historical consultant to the National Football Museum, particularly for elections to the English Football Hall of Fame. Though mainly known for her work on women's football, Williams has produced a range of material on the history of sports and the social contexts of events. She is author of A Game For Rough Girls: A History of Women's Football in England (Routledge 2003) and A Beautiful Game: International Perspectives on Women's Football (Berg 2007) and a research monograph called A Contemporary History of Women’s Sport (Routledge Research, 2011).

== Bibliography ==
=== Monographs ===
- 50 Women in Sport (Aurora Metro Books, 2022) ISBN 978-1-91364-101-6
- A Game For Rough Girls: A History of Women's Football in England (Routledge, 2003) ISBN 0-415-26338-7
- Beautiful Game: International Perspectives on Women's Football (Berg 2007) ISBN 978-1-84520-675-8

=== Journal guest editions ===
- 'Sport and Literature' a special edition of Sport in History with Jeff Hill (eds) (Routledge June 2009) ISSN 1746-0263
