= Women's sport in Australia =

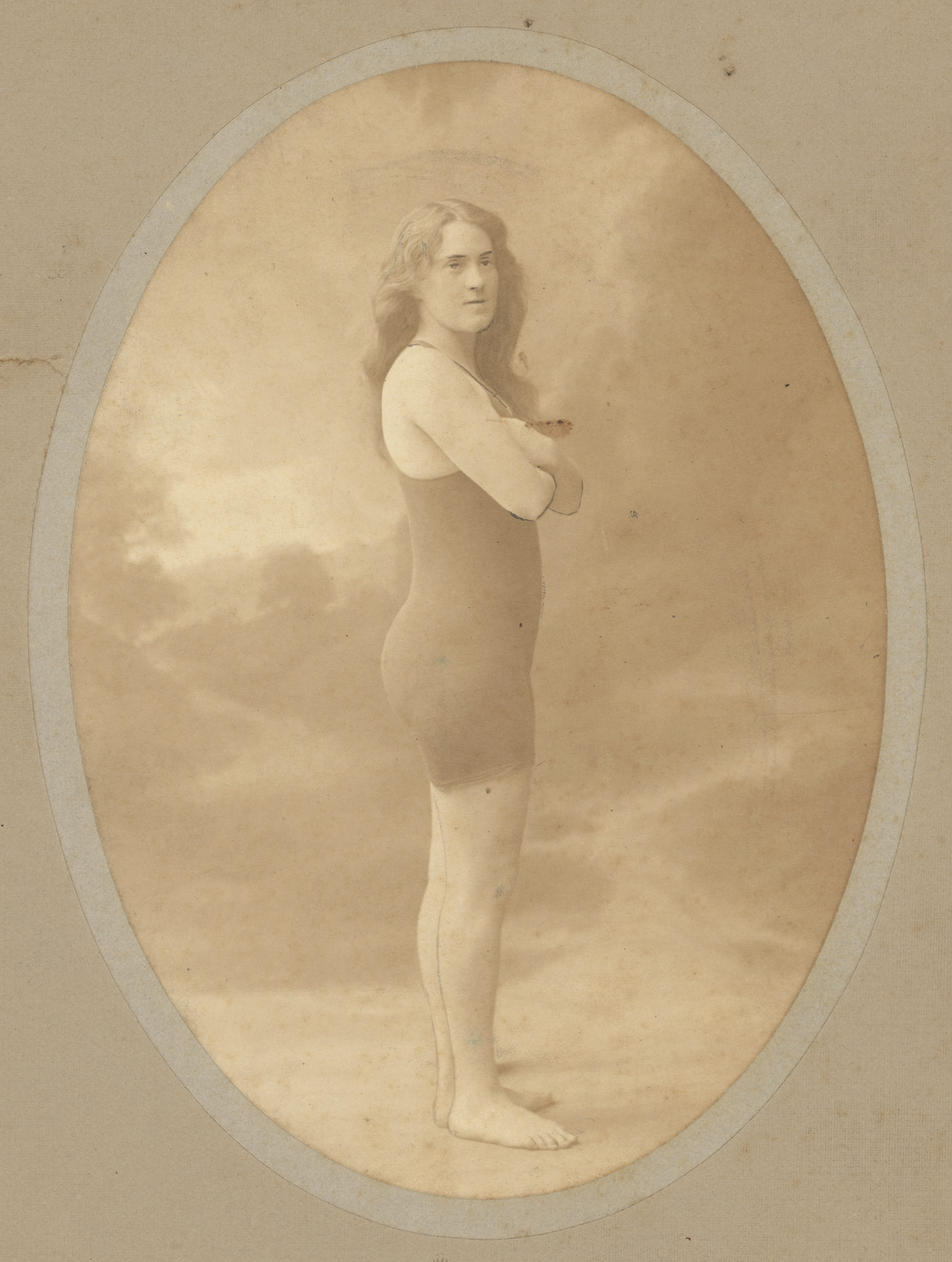
Fanny Durack, Stockholm Olympics, 1912

Women's sport in Australia started in the colonial era. Sport made its way into the school curriculum for girls by the 1890s. World War II had little impact on women's sport in the country. After the war, women's sport diversified as a result of new immigrants to the country. In the 1990s, the percentage of media coverage for women's sport on radio, television and in newspapers was not at parity with male sport. Basketball is nominally professional in Australia but players do not earn enough from the sport to compete full-time. Some Australians have gone overseas to play professional sport. Many television spectators for Australian sport are women. In person, netball has large percentage of female spectators. The Australian Federal and State governments have encouraged women to participate in all areas of sport.

== History ==
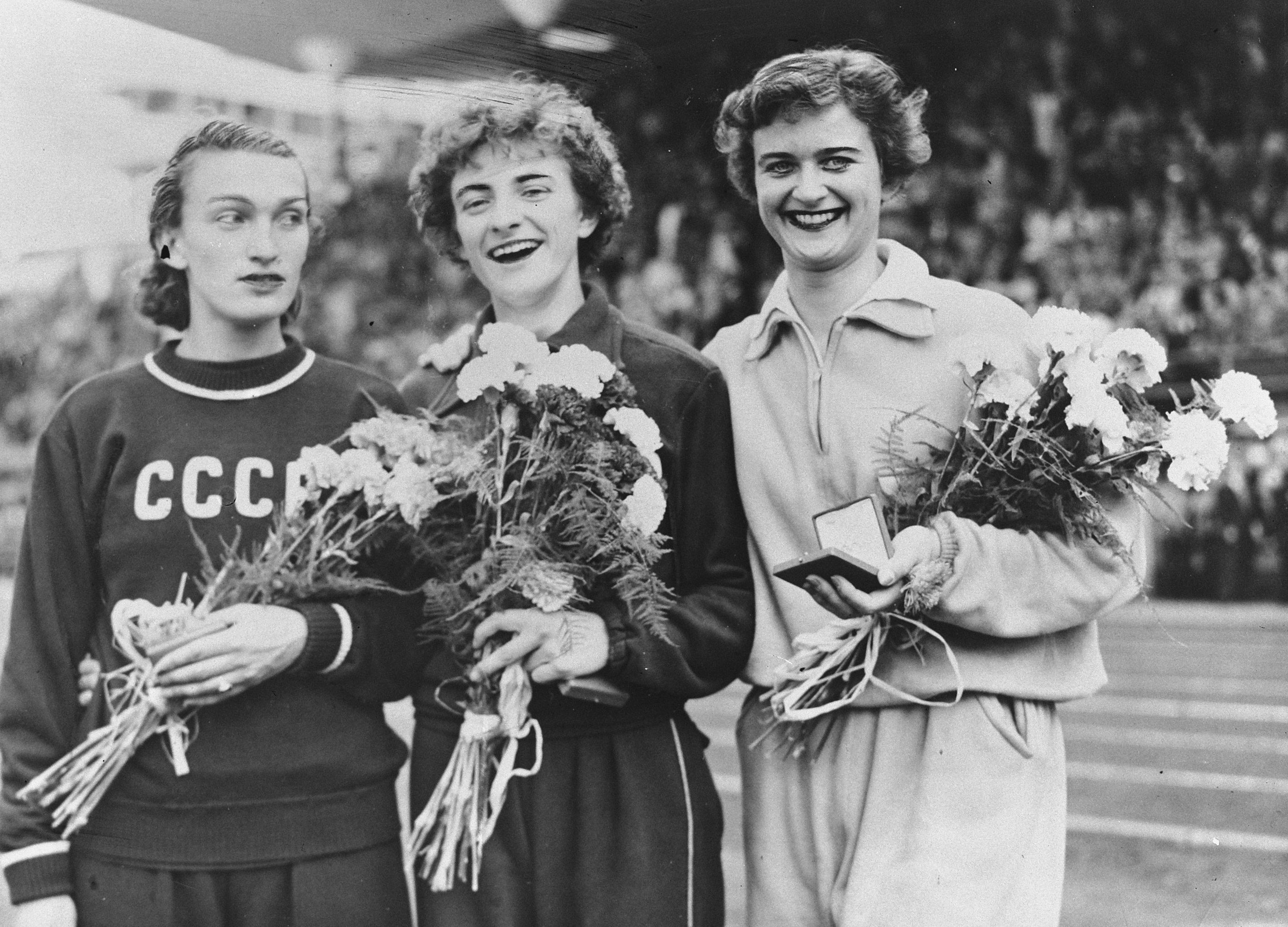
Marjorie Jackson-Nelson (centre) with Bertha Brouwer and Nadezhda Khnykina following the 200 meters at the 1952 Summer Olympics

In the colonial era, popular women's sports that were encouraged were often ones that did not challenge traditional gender definitions and allowed for men and women to compete fairly against one another. By the 1880s, a number of sports had been integrated into physical education courses for girls at schools in Victoria. The sports chosen and the methods of teaching them to girls borrowed from a British sporting and educational tradition. At the same time, a number of women's sporting contest were taking place in Australia including the first bicycling race in the world for women held in Ashfield, New South Wales, and the first Australian championship in golf, open to both genders, was the Australian Ladies' Championship played at Geelong in Victoria in 1894.

There were changes in the social acceptability of women's sport in Australia taking place by the 1900s and some sports like fencing began to become more open to female participation.

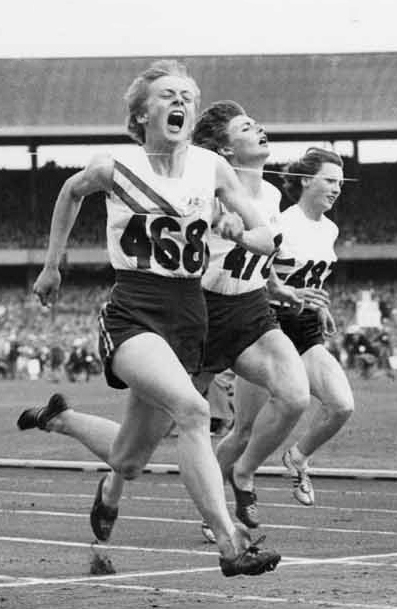
Betty Cuthbert, 100m final, 1956 Olympics

During the 1900s, there also began the creation of women's only sport clubs, including the Victorian Ladies' Bowling Association, which was established in 1907 as the first women's bowls association in the country. Women's only sport organisations continued to be formed for the next thirty years. The bowls association was followed up by the creation of the Australian Women's Hockey Association in 1910. A decade later, the Australian Women's Rowing Council on 13 May 1920 at the Telegraph Chambers Brisbane, Queensland. In 1931, the Australian Women's Cricket Council (AWCC) was formed in March 1931. In 1932, the Australian Women's Amateur Union was formed to manage women's track and field.

Coming out of the second World War, women's sport in the country was in a better place than sport in other countries. Many of the sport organisations for women remained intact during the war period and held competitions. Women did not have to deal with issues like food rationing, petrol rationing, population disbursement, and other issues facing women in post-war Europe. Sport had continued on largely undisturbed. At the end of World War II, Australia saw an increase in immigrants coming to the country, with many coming from places that had not previously sent immigrants to the country before. The influx of newcomers helped to introduce and led to participation in sports that had previously not enjoyed much popularity in Australia.

By the 1970s, amalgamation between male and female only sport clubs began to take place. In 1977, Australian Athletic Union was formed. This was a merger of the men's and women's athletics associations. This would continue into the 2000s, with Golf Australia forming in 2006 after the Australian Golf Union (AGU) and Women's Golf Australia (WGA) agreed to merge.

In 2005, The Australian Womensport & Recreation Association Inc (AWRA) was incorporated in July.

=== Timeline ===
The first cricket test match played at Brisbane Cricket Ground between Australia and England was held in 1934. In 1985, Dawn Fraser became the first female inductee in the Sport Australia Hall of Fame. In 2010, the 5th IWG World Conference on Women and Sport was held in Sydney between 20 and 23 May.

== Participation ==
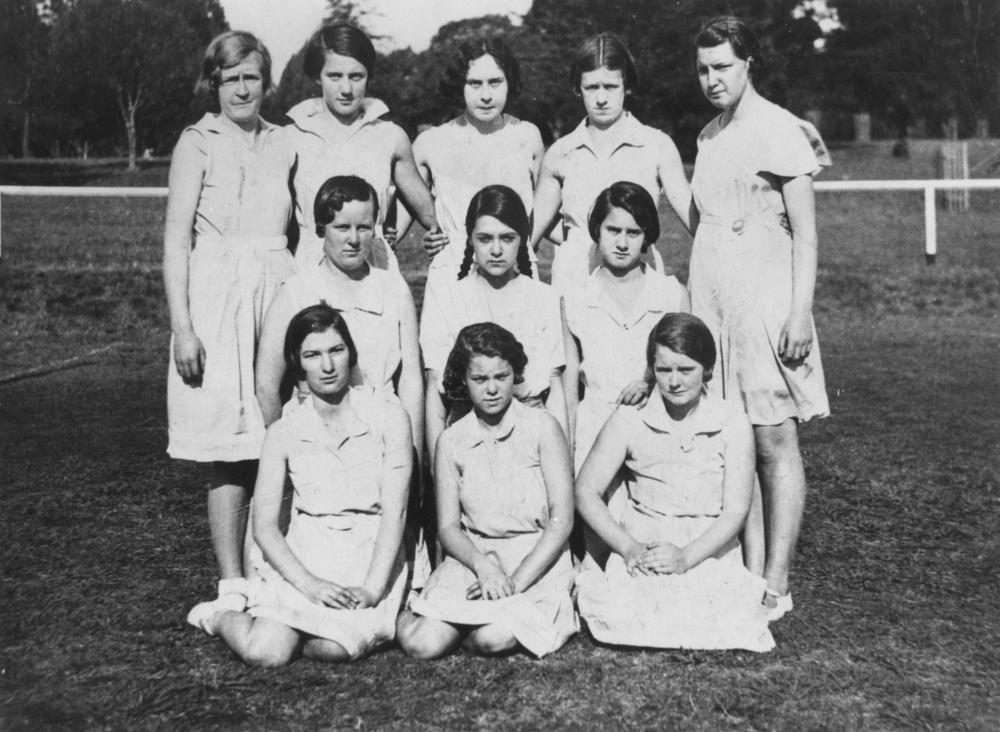
Toowoomba Netball team, 1932.

Australian Bureau of Statistics 2011–12 survey found that nearly 64% (around 5.8 million) of females aged 15 years and over reported that they had participated in sport and physical recreation at least once during the 12 months prior to interview. The top ten sport and recreation activities were: Walking for exercise (2,784,700), fitness/gymnasium (1,745,700), swimming/diving (729,200), jogging/running (585,400), cycling/bmx (490,600), netball (410,500), tennis (314,200), yoga (298, 900), dancing/ballet (229, 100) and bushwalking (216,800). These statistics do not cover children. The survey found that an estimated 734,700 females were involved in either a non-playing capacity only or in both a playing and non-playing capacity: 273,000 in coaching, 264,300 in scoring or timekeeping, 256,500 in administration, 115,100 in umpiring or refereeing and 60,000 in medical support.

== Spectatorship ==
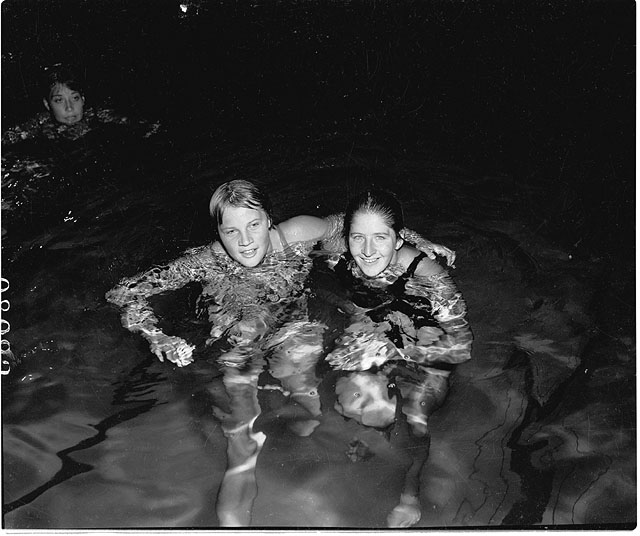
Dawn Fraser and Ilsa Konrads at the Australian National Swimming Championships and Olympic Trials, North Sydney Olympic Pool, 27 February 1960

Australian Bureau of Statistics survey Spectator Attendance at Sporting Events, 2009–10 reported the following findings regarding female attendance at sporting events. Survey found that an estimated 3.3 million females attended one or more sporting events as spectators. This represented 37% of females aged 15 years and over in Australia and 54% of females aged 15–17 years. The top ten sports in attendance were: Australian rules football (1,171,100), horse racing (925,000), rugby league (594,700), motor sports (456,800), soccer (354,800), rugby union (209,300), cricket (190,500), harness racing (190,200), tennis (171,300) and netball (123,000).

For women's only sporting events, netball has the highest attendance. In 2013, netball's ANZ Championship had an 18 per cent increase on both 2011 and 2010 seasons with over 134,000 attending the first nine rounds of the season.

In April 2024, the 2023–24 A-League Women season set the record for the most attended season of any women's sport in Australian history, with the season recording a total attendance of 284,551 on 15 April 2024, and finishing with a final total attendance of 312,199. However, that record has been overtaken during the 2025 Suncorp Super Netball season, where the total attendance of spectators was 386,455 making it the most attended season of any women's sport in Australian history.

== Media coverage ==
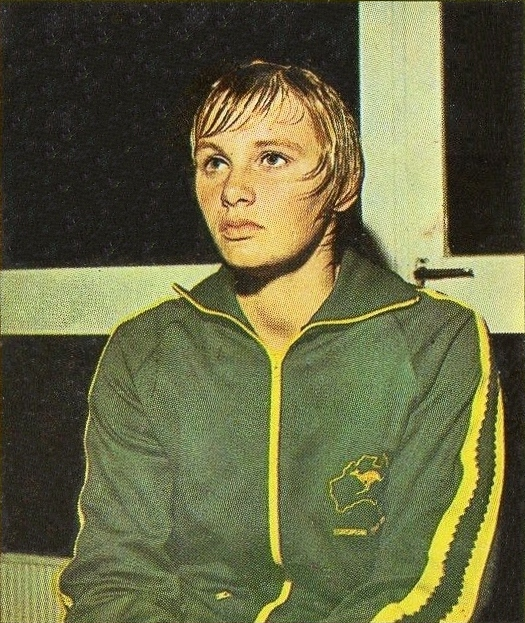
Shane Gould swimmer who won five Olympic medals, including three gold, at the 1972 Munich Olympics.

The lack of media coverage of women's sport in Australia has presented challenges to female participants in several areas, including providing few role models and making it hard to acquire money from sponsors. In 1996, across the mediums of newspaper, radio and television, the worst coverage as a percentage of total sport coverage for women was on radio with only 1.4% of the coverage being for women's sport. Newspaper coverage was the best at 10.7%, with television coming in second with 2% of all sport coverage being exclusively for women's sport. The newspaper coverage was significantly better than four years earlier, where the total coverage of women's sport was 4.5%. Newspaper coverage had issues: Most of the women's sport coverage came on days when there was little news regarding men's sport.

A recent study showed that interest in women's sports would be bigger if the sports were streamed as free-to-air broadcasting. Meaning, the women sports would be free to watch without any subscriptions needed. Social media is a great example of this. As far as social media rankings in watching women's sports, Facebook is first (87%), YouTube is second (56%), and Instagram is third (43%).

The Rebel Women's Big Bash (WBBL) and the Women's Australian Rules Football league (AFLW) are two good examples of platforms that have attracted a following. Women's Australian cricket currently has a 43% interest percentage.

In 2010, a report by University of New South Wales Journalism and Media Research Centre and Media Monitors found that coverage of women in sport made up only 9% of all sports coverage in Australian television news. But, coverage on male sport occupied 81% of television news reporting. There was 10% of coverage being non-gender specific.

== Professional sport ==
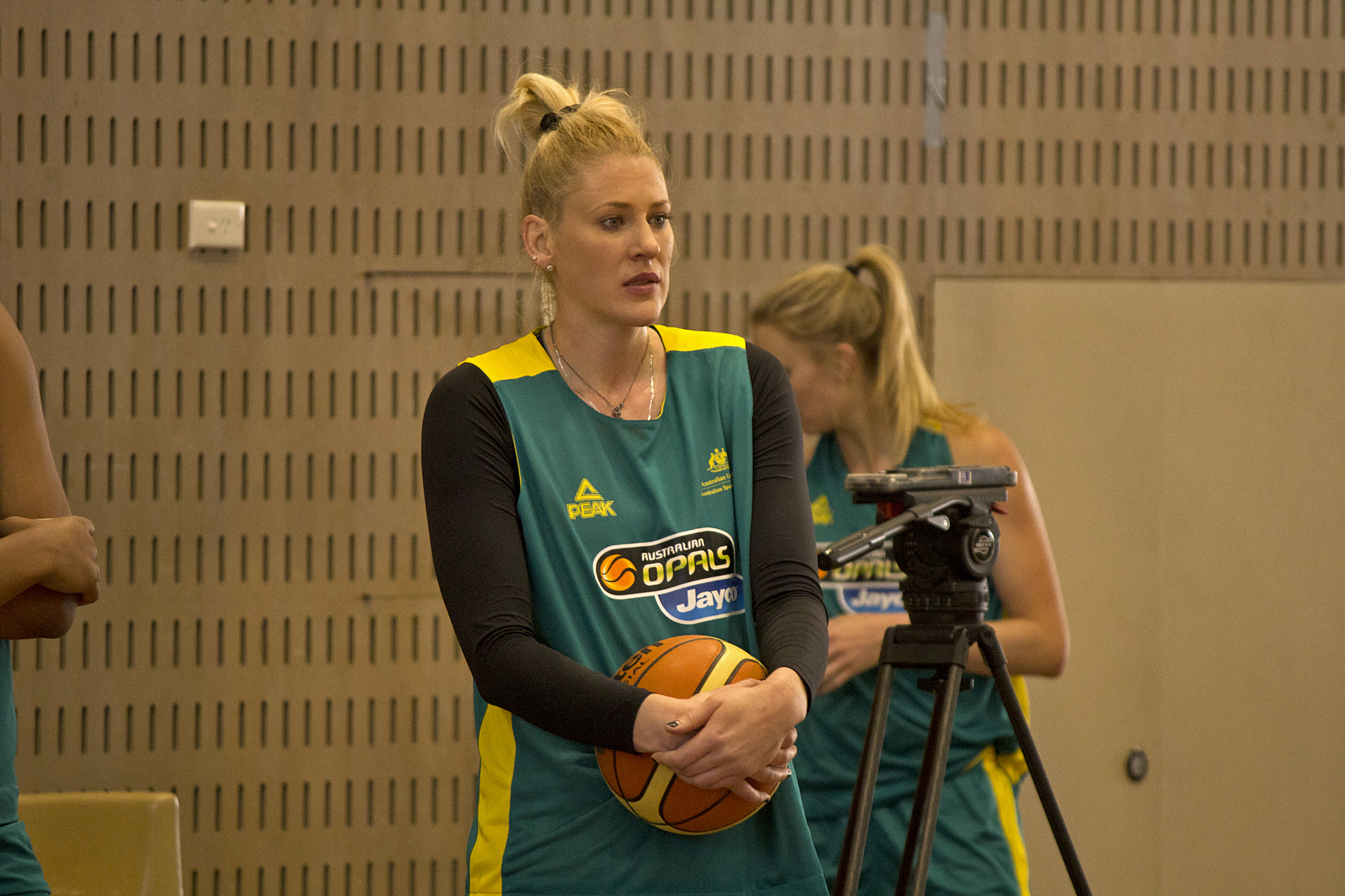
Lauren Jackson basketball player who is considered one of the greatest female basketball players of all time, winning multiple WNBA championships and Olympic medals.

Now, there are significantly fewer women than men earning an income from sport in Australia. Traditionally professional female golfers, tennis players, and surfers have been able to earn an income from international circuits. There are a limited number of high-profile female Olympic athletes that have been able to supplement government grants and competition earnings with sponsorships. The lack of sponsorship for female athletes was highlighted when Sally Pearson, 100 metres hurdles gold medalist from the 2012 London Olympics, had lost sponsors after the Games.

In recent years, athletes from team sports such as basketball and to a lesser extent football and netball have been able to derive some income from sport. In 2009, the salaries for average players in the Women's National Basketball League were not high enough to allow them to play basketball full-time: They made between $5,000 and $10,000 a year. Australian athletes have gone overseas to play professional sport. Amongst these are Lauren Jackson, Erin Phillips, Kristi Harrower, Belinda Snell, and Penny Taylor, who played basketball in the United States.

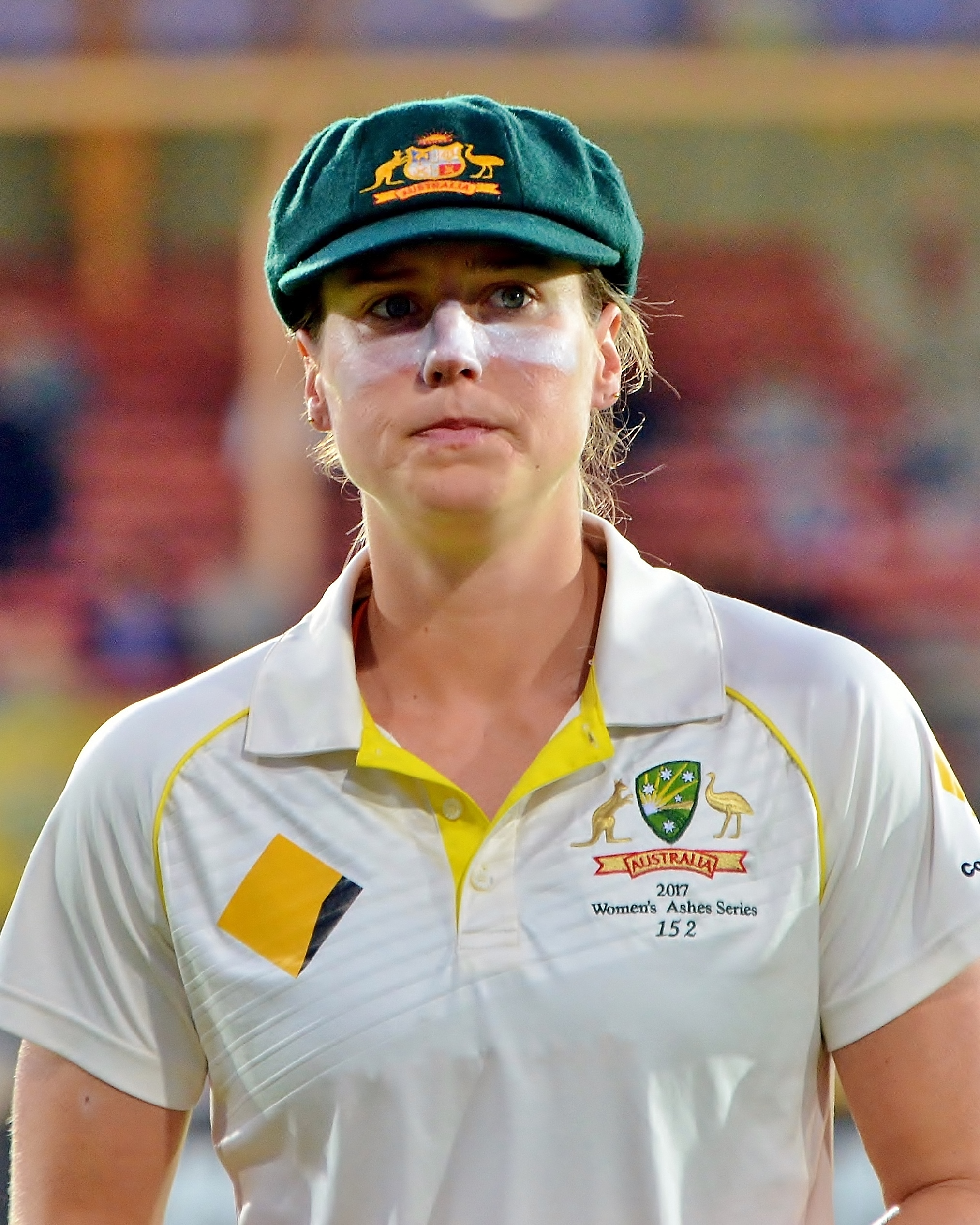
Ellyse Perry cricket and soccer player who has excelled in both sports, representing Australia in multiple World Cups and Olympic Games.

In recent years, netball players have been able to earn an income particularly since the establishment of the ANZ Championship. However, in 2013 Australian Diamonds players argued for their current average salary of $10,000 a year to be boosted to $20,000. During the dispute, the CEO of Netball Australia, Kate Palmer, stated that seven of the current Diamonds earned more than $100,000 from netball and related activities, with four earning more than $150,000. After the 2016 netball season, Netball Australia pulled out of the ANZ Championship in favour of setting up its own national league, which launched the next season as Suncorp Super Netball. In the first season of the new league, the minimum player wage was set at over $27,000, more than double the minimum in the final season of the ANZ Championship. The minimum player wage rose to $30,000 for the 2019 season.

There have been issues involving the national soccer team, the Matildas and their pay. On a national level, the pay disparity between men and women has caused issues. The Matildas earn just $500 an international game, while the male national team, the Socceroos earn more than $6500 per game. The men's team made more money in one game at the World Cup than the women would have if they made it to the final. Comparing the two teams success, the Matildas are currently ranked 5th in the world, while the men sit at 50. This tension eventually boiled over, as the Matildas boycotted an international tour of the US in 2015 in protest against the lack of financial reward they were receiving. This tour was very significant, as it was only a few months after the success at the World Cup. They were also coming up against the current world champions, so it was a big chance to demonstrate the continued rise of women's soccer in Australia. However, following unsuccessful negotiations with the FFA they decided to protest and boycott the tour. The dispute centred on a number of objectives some of which are interrelated, and can be broken down as follows:

(i) provision of basic minimum standards setting out the time commitment and requirements necessary for high performance standards in international football;

(ii) Pay equality and equality of opportunity;

(iii) Establishing a career pathway for elite women footballers and making football the sport of choice for young women.

The PFA want an immediate correction to Matildas salaries so they are at least on par with the Australian minimum wage of about $33,000 a year and for them to be able to take up opportunities overseas when not playing and training for the national squad.

== Amateur sport ==
=== Olympics ===
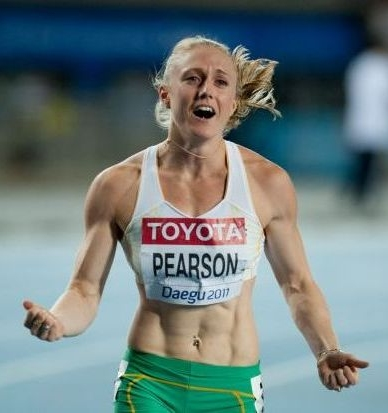
Sally Pearson hurdler who won gold at the 2012 London Olympics and was a dominant force in the sport during her career.

In 1912, Fanny Durack and Mina Wylie became the first female athletes to represent Australia at the Summer Olympics. At the 1912 Stockholm Olympics, Durack won the gold medal and Wylie the silver medal in the Women's 100m Freestyle.

In 1952, Nancy Burley and Gweneth Moloney became Australia's first female Winter Olympians. They competed at figure skating at 1952 Winter Olympics in Oslo, Norway.

In 1991, Helen Brownlee became the first woman elected to the Australian Olympic Committee's executive board.

In 1988, at the Seoul Olympics, the Australian women's hockey team Hockeyroos, became the first Australian women's team sport to win an Olympic gold medal. The Hockeyroos went on to win the gold medal at the 1996 Atlanta and 2000 Sydney Games.

In 2002, Alisa Camplin competing at the 2012 Winter Olympics Salt Lake City became Australia's first female Winter Olympics gold medalist.

=== Paralympics ===
In 1960, Daphne Hilton was the only Australian female on the Australian Team at the 1960 Paralympic Games, the first Summer Games.
In 2006, Emily Jansen, a below-knee amputee alpine skier, became Australia's first female Winter Paralympian.

== Government ==
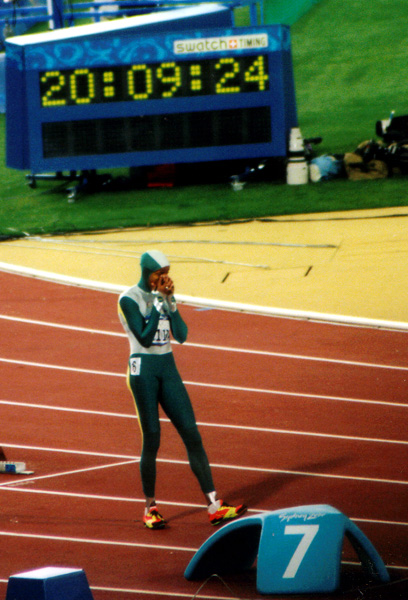
Cathy Freeman preparing to race in the Olympic 400 m final, Sydney 2000.

In 1984, the Commonwealth Sex Discrimination Act 1984 was passed. This Act made it unlawful to discriminate against a person for their sex, marital status or if they were pregnant. All sporting clubs were forced to give the option to women if they wanted to become members in any sport they played or participated in.

Australian government's have encouraged women's participation in sport. In 1985, Australian Government's working group on women in sport published a report titled Women, Sport and the Media which recommended the creation of the Women's Sport unit within the Australian Sports Commission (ASC). This Unit was established in 1988. In 1992, an Active Girls campaign was launched by the ASC in an attempt to reduce the drop out of teenage girls from sport. In 2002, the ASC with $180,000 of funding from the Office of the Status of Women established a grants program to improve the leadership skills of women who deliver sport in rural and remote communities. In the financial year 2013–2014, Sport Leadership Grants and Scholarships for Women Program provided $400,000 for individuals and organisations to undertake training to improve their leadership potential in the areas of: coaching, officiating, governance, management and administration and communications, media, and marketing.

In 2006, the Australian Parliament's Senate Environment, Recreation, Communications and the Arts Committee published the report About time! : women in sport and recreation in Australia. This extensive review made recommendations related to grass roots and elite athlete participation, leadership and governance and the mass media. The Committee recognised the benefits to women and girls of participating in sport and recreation but noted the high drop out rates in female participation. It also found that the some areas of the Australian media neglected reporting women's sporting achievements. The Australian Government responded to the report in 2012.

== See also ==
- List of Australian sportswomen – notable current and former athletes
- Australian Womensport and Recreation Association
- Australian Women's Health Sport Awards
